= 1997 Scottish Claymores season =

World League of American Football team season

- General manager: Mike Keller
- Head coach: Jim Criner
- Home stadium: Murrayfield Stadium

Results
- Record: 5–5
- Division place: 3rd
- Playoffs: did not qualify

The 1997 Scottish Claymores season was the third season for the franchise in the World League of American Football (WLAF). The team was led by head coach Jim Criner in his third year, and played its home games at Murrayfield Stadium in Edinburgh, Scotland. They finished the regular season in third place with a record of five wins and five losses.

General manager Mike Keller resigned at the end of the season, wanting to pursue opportunities in the United States.

== Offseason ==
=== World League draft ===
1997 Scottish Claymores World League draft selections
Draft order		Player name	Position	College
Round	Choice	Player name	Position	College
1	6	Troy Bailey	DE	Oregon
2	12	Keith Powe	DE	UTEP
3	13	Jaime Fields	LB	Washington
4	24	Ervin Collier	NT	Florida A&M
5	25	Ron Childs	LB	Washington State
6	36	Rickey Brady	TE	Oklahoma
7	37	Sean Holcomb	DE	Texas A&M–Kingsville
8	48	Ahmani Johnson	LB	Oregon State
9	49	Kevin Scott	CB	Stanford
10	60	Jeff Cummins	DE	Oregon
11	61	Ron Moran	LB	Southern Illinois
12	72	Cedric Saunders	TE	Ohio State
13	73	Robert Bass	LB	Miami (Fla.)
14	84	Burnell Roques	WR	Claremont
15	85	Doug Terry	S	Kansas
16	96	Larry Williams	DT	Mississippi State
17	97	Demetrice Martin	CB	Michigan State
18	108	Mu Tagoai	C	Arizona
19	109	Steve Papin	RB	Penn State
20	120	Chris Dausin	C	Texas A&M

== Personnel ==
=== Staff ===
1997 Scottish Claymores staff
Front office: General Manager – Mike Keller; Head coaches: Head Coach/Offensive Line – Jim Criner; Offensive coaches: Offensive Coordinator/Quarterbacks – Jim Sochor; Receivers – Vince Alcalde; National Coach – Mike Kenny	Defensive coaches: Defensive Coordinator/Defensive Backs – Jimmy Carr; Defensive Line – Bill Dutton; Linebackers – Larry Owens

=== Roster ===
1997 Scottish Claymores final roster
Quarterbacks: 12 Dave Barr; 14 Spence Fischer; 10 Mark Hartsell; Running backs: 35 Jared Kaaiohelo; 21 Steve Papin; 33 Mazio Royster (IR); 27 Siran Stacy; 40 Markus Thomas; Wide receivers: 80 Allen DeGraffenreid; 82 Eric Smith; 83 Yo Murphy; Tight ends: 89 Rickey Brady; 85 Cedric Saunders	Offensive linemen: 72 Randy Bierman T; 70 Ron Florine T; 79 Purvis Hunt G; 77 Matt Joyce T; 63 Marco Rivera G; 71 Bill Schultz G; 76 Jeff Smith C; Defensive linemen: 94 Troy Bailey DT; 96 David Barnard DT; 94 Wilky Bazile DE; 92 Brad Keeney DT; 98 Keith Powe DE; 95 Jason Simmons DE; 99 Cornell Thomas DE; 90 Larry Williams DT (IR)	Linebackers: 58 Ron Childs OLB; 55 Jaime Fields OLB; 56 James Logan OLB; 59 Ron Moran OLB; 53 Eric Unverzagt MLB; Defensive backs: 34 George Coghill S; 46 Fredric Ford CB; 30 Demetrice Martin S; 38 Kevin Scott CB; 26 Charles Swann CB; 28 Doug Terry S; Special teams: 5 Wayne Lammle P/K	National players: 88 (Japan) Nachi Abe TE; 84 (Scotland) Steven Branscombe WR; 81 (Scotland) Scott Couper WR; 91 (England) Robert Flickinger DE; 3 (Finland) Kari Gronroos K; 11 (Scotland) Gary Parker K; 57 (Russia) Mikhail Sloutsky OLB; 51 (Republic of Ireland) Emmett Waldron MLB; Rookies in italics

== Schedule ==
Week	Date	Kickoff (Note: All times local to where the game was played.)	Opponent	Results		Game site	Attendance
Week	Date	Kickoff	Opponent	Final score	Team record	Game site	Attendance
1	Saturday, 12 April	7:00 p.m.	at Amsterdam Admirals	W 16–3	1–0	Amsterdam ArenA	16,185
2	Sunday, 20 April	3:00 p.m.	Barcelona Dragons	L 7–20	1–1	Murrayfield Stadium	14,877
3	Sunday, 27 April	3:00 p.m.	Rhein Fire	L 10–23	1–2	Murrayfield Stadium	11,166
4	Saturday, 3 May	7:00 p.m.	at Frankfurt Galaxy	W 9–3	2–2	Waldstadion	32,690
5	Sunday, 11 May	3:00 p.m.	at London Monarchs	L 8–16	2–3	Stamford Bridge	11,210
6	Sunday, 18 May	3:00 p.m.	Amsterdam Admirals	W 10–6	3–3	Murrayfield Stadium	9,021
7	Sunday, 25 May	3:00 p.m.	at Rhein Fire	W 23–20	4–3	Rheinstadion	20,498
8	Sunday, 1 June	3:00 p.m.	Frankfurt Galaxy	W 24–7	5–3	Murrayfield Stadium	11,618
9	Sunday, 8 June	3:00 p.m.	London Monarchs	L 9–10	5–4	Murrayfield Stadium	16,115
10	Saturday, 14 June	7:30 p.m.	at Barcelona Dragons	L 18–46	5–5	Estadi Olímpic de Montjuïc	10,523

== Standings ==
World League of American Football
Team	W	L	T	PCT	PF	PA	Home	Road	STK
Rhein Fire	7	3	0	.700	206	146	3–2	4–1	W3
Barcelona Dragons	5	5	0	.500	236	209	2–3	3–2	W1
Scottish Claymores	5	5	0	.500	134	154	2–3	3–2	L2
Amsterdam Admirals	5	5	0	.500	156	160	4–1	1–4	W1
Frankfurt Galaxy	4	6	0	.400	147	142	3–2	1–4	L1
London Monarchs	4	6	0	.400	116	184	2–3	2–3	L1

== Game summaries ==
=== Week 1: at Amsterdam Admirals ===
Week One: Scottish Claymores at Amsterdam Admirals – Game summary

Quarter	1	2	3	4	Total
Scotland	0	6	0	10	16
Amsterdam	0	0	0	3	3

at Amsterdam ArenA, Amsterdam, Netherlands

- Date: Saturday, 12 April
- Game time: 7:00 p.m. CEST
- Game attendance: 16,185

=== Week 3: vs Rhein Fire ===
Week Three: Rhein Fire at Scottish Claymores – Game summary

Quarter	1	2	3	4	Total
Rhein	13	0	7	3	23
Scotland	0	0	3	7	10

at Murrayfield Stadium, Edinburgh, Scotland

- Date: Sunday, 27 April
- Game time: 3:00 p.m. BST
- Game attendance: 11,166

=== Week 4: at Frankfurt Galaxy ===
Week Four: Scottish Claymores at Frankfurt Galaxy – Game summary

Quarter	1	2	3	4	Total
Scotland	3	0	0	6	9
Frankfurt	0	3	0	0	3

at Waldstadion, Frankfurt, Germany

- Date: Saturday, 3 May
- Game time: 7:00 p.m. CEST
- Game attendance: 32,690
- Referee: Walt Coleman

=== Week 6: vs Amsterdam Admirals ===
Week Six: Amsterdam Admirals at Scottish Claymores – Game summary

Quarter	1	2	3	4	Total
Amsterdam	0	3	0	3	6
Scotland	3	0	0	7	10

at Murrayfield Stadium, Edinburgh, Scotland

- Date: Sunday, 18 May
- Game time: 3:00 p.m. BST
- Game attendance: 9,021

=== Week 7: at Rhein Fire ===
Week Seven: Scottish Claymores at Rhein Fire – Game summary

Quarter	1	2	3	4	Total
Scotland	7	0	0	16	23
Rhein	3	10	7	0	20

at Rheinstadion, Düsseldorf, Germany

- Date: Sunday, 25 May
- Game time: 3:00 p.m. CEST
- Game attendance: 20,498

=== Week 8: vs Frankfurt Galaxy ===
Week Eight: Frankfurt Galaxy at Scottish Claymores – Game summary

Quarter	1	2	3	4	Total
Frankfurt	0	0	0	7	7
Scotland	0	3	14	7	24

at Murrayfield Stadium, Edinburgh, Scotland

- Date: Sunday, 1 June
- Game time: 3:00 p.m. BST
- Game attendance: 11,618

== Awards ==
After the completion of the regular season, the All-World League team was selected by members of the media. Overall, Scotland had five players selected. The selections were:

- George Coghill, safety
- Scott Couper, offensive national player
- Wayne Lammle, punter
- Jason Simmons, defensive end
- Siran Stacy, running back

Additionally, Simmons was selected defensive MVP by the six World League head coaches.
