= 1997 Amsterdam Admirals season =

World League of American Football team season

- General manager: Bill Peterson
- Head coach: Al Luginbill
- Home stadium: Amsterdam ArenA

Results
- Record: 5–5
- Division place: 4th
- Playoffs: Did not qualify

The 1997 Amsterdam Admirals season was the third season for the franchise in the World League of American Football (WLAF). The team was led by head coach Al Luginbill in his third year, and played its home games at Amsterdam ArenA in Amsterdam, Netherlands. They finished the regular season in fourth place with a record of five wins and five losses.

== Offseason ==
=== World League draft ===
1997 Amsterdam Admirals World League draft selections
Draft order		Player name	Position	College
Round	Choice	Player name	Position	College
1	4	Brent Moss	RB	Wisconsin
2	10	Trevor Wilmot	LB	Indiana
3	15	Bronzell Miller	DE	Utah
4	22	Larry McSeed	LB	Delaware
5	27	Curtis Caesar	WR	Grambling
6	34	Bryan Dickerson	RB	Eastern Kentucky
7	39	Ronnie Woolfork	LB	Colorado
8	46	Dion Lambert	CB	UCLA
9	51	Roosevelt Collins	LB	Texas Christian
10	58	Jon Heidenreich	G	Northeast Louisiana
11	63	Lamar Mills	DE	Indiana
12	70	Charles Gordon	CB	Eastern Michigan
13	75	Bryan Reeves	WR	Nevada
14	82	Ron Lewis	G	Washington State
15	87	Rich Yurkiewicz	LB	Kent State
16	94	Robert Hall	QB	Texas Tech
17	99	Ray Forsythe	G	Central Florida
18	106	Earl Scott	G	Arkansas
19	111	Steve Hendrickson	LB	California
20	118	Damon Thomas	WR	Wayne State
21	122	Reggie Barnes	LB	Oklahoma
22	126	Jim Ward	DT	Slippery Rock
23	129	Joe Montford	LB	South Carolina State
24	130	Richard Fall	K	None
25	132	Steve Brannon	DE	Hampton

== Personnel ==
=== Staff ===
1997 Amsterdam Admirals staff
Front office: General Manager – Bill Peterson; Head coaches: Head Coach/Defensive Coordinator – Al Luginbill; Offensive coaches: Offensive Coordinator/Quarterbacks/Wide Receivers – Joe Clark; Running Backs – Bob Gambold; Offensive Line – Al Tanara; National Coach/Tight Ends – Marcus Muler	Defensive coaches: Defensive Line – Willie Jones; Linebackers – Chuck Shelton; Japanese Coach/Defensive Assistant – Kiyo Mori

=== Roster ===
1997 Amsterdam Admirals final roster
Quarterbacks: 11 Jay Fiedler; 10 Mike McCoy; 12 John Sacca; Running backs: 22 Ralph Dawkins; 26 Bryan Dickerson; 35 Brent Moss; Wide receivers: 80 Johnnie Barnes; 88 Darren Chandler; 7 Robert Hall; 87 Barry Kloeth; 81 Latario Rachal; 1 Dedric Smith; Tight ends: 45 John Davis; 82 Carlos Etheredge	Offensive linemen: 62 Matt Brown G; 78 Jerry Crafts T; 64 Ryan Leahy G; 66 Ron Lewis G; 67 Kenneth McDaniel G/T; 65 Earl Scott C; 71 Clay Williams T; Defensive linemen: 92 Roosevelt Collins DE; 97 Mike Evans DT; 75 Garry Howe DT; 96 Bronzell Miller DE; 73 Lamar Mills DT; 99 Troy Ridgley DT	Linebackers: 57 Cedric Figaro; 52 Marc Lillibridge; 51 Larry McSeed; 56 Trevor Wilmot; 53 Rich Yurkiewicz; Defensive backs: 21 Ron Carpenter CB/S; 38 Harvey Franklin CB; 25 Tommy Johnson CB; 23 Tommy Jones CB; 34 Dion Lambert CB; 27 Robert O'Neal S; 29 Jey Phillips S; 28 Jeff Russell S; 46 Kelly Sims CB; Special teams: 5 Brian Gragert P; 6 Carlos Huerta K (IR)	National players: 90 (Armenia) Avo Avetisyan DE; 14 (Netherlands) Silvio Diliberto K; 61 (Netherlands) Jeroen Egge C; 69 (Sweden) Jorgen Gustafsson T; 86 (Japan) Masato Itai WR; 55 (Japan) Masafumi Kawaguchi LB; 8 (Denmark) Ollie Quass K; 33 (Netherlands) Frank Temming RB; Rookies in italics

== Schedule ==
Week	Date	Kickoff (Note: All times local to where the game was played.)	Opponent	Results		Game site	Attendance
Week	Date	Kickoff	Opponent	Final score	Team record	Game site	Attendance
1	Saturday, April 12	7:00 p.m.	Scottish Claymores	L 3–16	0–1	Amsterdam ArenA	16,185
2	Saturday, April 19	7:00 p.m.	at Frankfurt Galaxy	L 10–19	0–2	Waldstadion	31,729
3	Saturday, April 26	7:00 p.m.	London Monarchs	W 34–6	1–2	Amsterdam ArenA	13,767
4	Saturday, May 3	7:00 p.m.	Rhein Fire	W 23–20	2–2	Amsterdam ArenA	10,698
5	Sunday, May 11	7:30 p.m.	at Barcelona Dragons	L 21–28	2–3	Estadi Olímpic de Montjuïc	14,152
6	Sunday, May 18	3:00 p.m.	at Scottish Claymores	L 6–10	2–4	Murrayfield Stadium	9,021
7	Saturday, May 24	7:00 p.m.	Barcelona Dragons	W 21–26	3–4	Amsterdam ArenA	13,289
8	Sunday, June 1	3:00 p.m.	at London Monarchs	W 13–9	4–4	Stamford Bridge	9,150
9	Saturday, June 7	7:00 p.m.	at Rhein Fire	L 0–24	4–5	Rheinstadion	23,697
10	Saturday, June 14	7:00 p.m.	Frankfurt Galaxy	W 20–7	5–5	Amsterdam ArenA	19,486

== Standings ==
World League of American Football
Team	W	L	T	PCT	PF	PA	Home	Road	STK
Rhein Fire	7	3	0	.700	206	146	3–2	4–1	W3
Barcelona Dragons	5	5	0	.500	236	209	2–3	3–2	W1
Scottish Claymores	5	5	0	.500	134	154	2–3	3–2	L2
Amsterdam Admirals	5	5	0	.500	156	160	4–1	1–4	W1
Frankfurt Galaxy	4	6	0	.400	147	142	3–2	1–4	L1
London Monarchs	4	6	0	.400	116	184	2–3	2–3	L1

== Game summaries ==
=== Week 1: vs Scottish Claymores ===
Week One: Scottish Claymores at Amsterdam Admirals – Game summary

Quarter	1	2	3	4	Total
Scotland	0	6	0	10	16
Amsterdam	0	0	0	3	3

at Amsterdam ArenA, Amsterdam, Netherlands

- Date: Saturday, April 12
- Game time: 7:00 p.m. CEST
- Game attendance: 16,185

=== Week 2: at Frankfurt Galaxy ===
Week Two: Amsterdam Admirals at Frankfurt Galaxy – Game summary

Quarter	1	2	3	4	Total
Amsterdam	0	3	7	0	10
Frankfurt	10	3	3	3	19

at Waldstadion, Frankfurt, Germany

- Date: Saturday, April 19
- Game time: 7:00 p.m. CEST
- Game attendance: 31,729
- Referee: Mike Pereira

=== Week 3: vs London Monarchs ===
Week Three: London Monarchs at Amsterdam Admirals – Game summary

Quarter	1	2	3	4	Total
London	0	6	0	0	6
Amsterdam	7	13	0	14	34

at Amsterdam ArenA, Amsterdam, Netherlands

- Date: Saturday, April 26
- Game time: 7:00 p.m. CEST
- Game attendance: 13,767
- Referee: Walt Coleman

=== Week 4: vs Rhein Fire ===
Week Four: Rhein Fire at Amsterdam Admirals – Game summary

Quarter	1	2	3	4	Total
Rhein	0	6	7	7	20
Amsterdam	10	0	6	7	23

at Amsterdam ArenA, Amsterdam, Netherlands

- Date: Saturday, May 3
- Game time: 7:00 p.m. CEST
- Game attendance: 10,698

=== Week 5: at Barcelona Dragons ===
Week Five: Amsterdam Admirals at Barcelona Dragons – Game summary

Quarter	1	2	3	4	Total
Amsterdam	0	0	14	7	21
Barcelona	14	7	0	7	28

at Estadi Olímpic de Montjuïc, Barcelona, Spain

- Date: Sunday, May 11
- Game time: 7:30 p.m. CEST
- Game attendance: 14,152

=== Week 6: at Scottish Claymores ===
Week Six: Amsterdam Admirals at Scottish Claymores – Game summary

Quarter	1	2	3	4	Total
Amsterdam	0	3	0	3	6
Scotland	3	0	0	7	10

at Murrayfield Stadium, Edinburgh, Scotland

- Date: Sunday, May 18
- Game time: 3:00 p.m. BST
- Game attendance: 9,021

=== Week 7: vs Barcelona Dragons ===
Week Seven: Barcelona Dragons at Amsterdam Admirals – Game summary

Quarter	1	2	3	4	Total
Barcelona	7	0	14	0	21
Amsterdam	0	17	0	9	26

at Amsterdam ArenA, Amsterdam, Netherlands

- Date: Saturday, May 24
- Game time: 7:00 p.m. CEST
- Game attendance: 13,289

=== Week 8: at London Monarchs ===
Week Eight: Amsterdam Admirals at London Monarchs – Game summary

Quarter	1	2	3	4	Total
Amsterdam	7	0	0	6	13
London	0	0	3	6	9

at Stamford Bridge, London, England

- Date: Sunday, June 1
- Game time: 3:00 p.m. BST
- Game attendance: 9,150

=== Week 9: at Rhein Fire ===
Week Nine: Amsterdam Admirals at Rhein Fire – Game summary

Quarter	1	2	3	4	Total
Amsterdam	0	0	0	0	0
Rhein	7	10	0	7	24

at Rheinstadion, Düsseldorf, Germany

- Date: Saturday, June 7
- Game time: 7:00 p.m. CEST
- Game attendance: 23,697

=== Week 10: vs Frankfurt Galaxy ===
Week Ten: Frankfurt Galaxy at Amsterdam Admirals – Game summary

Quarter	1	2	3	4	Total
Frankfurt	0	7	0	0	7
Amsterdam	0	7	13	0	20

at Amsterdam ArenA, Amsterdam, Netherlands

- Date: Saturday, June 14
- Game time: 7:00 p.m. CEST
- Game attendance: 19,486

== Awards ==
After the completion of the regular season, the All-World League team was selected by members of the media. Amsterdam had only one player selected, defensive tackle Troy Ridgley.
