= 1997 Barcelona Dragons season =

World League of American Football team season

1997 Barcelona Dragons (NFL Europe) season
- General manager: Jordi Vila-Puig
- Head coach: Jack Bicknell
- Home stadium: Estadi Olímpic de Montjuïc

Results
- Record: 5–5
- Division place: 2nd
- Playoffs: World Bowl '97 champions

The 1997 Barcelona Dragons season was the fifth season for the franchise in the World League of American Football (WLAF). The team was led by head coach Jack Bicknell in his fifth year, and played its home games at Estadi Olímpic de Montjuïc in Barcelona, Catalonia, Spain. They finished the regular season in second place with a record of five wins and five losses. In World Bowl '97, Barcelona defeated the Rhein Fire 38–24. The victory marked the franchise's first World Bowl championship.

== Offseason ==
=== World League draft ===
1997 Barcelona Dragons World League draft selections
Draft order		Player name	Position	College
Round	Choice	Player name	Position	College
1	3	Oliver Barnett	DE	Kentucky
2	9	Corey Mayfield	DL	Oklahoma
3	16	P. J. Killian	LB	Virginia
4	21	Butler By'not'e	CB	Ohio State
5	28	Hugh Hunter	DE	Hampton
6	33	Carlos Yancy	CB	Georgia
7	40	Tristan Moss	CB	Western Michigan
8	45	Santo Stephens	LB	Temple
9	52	Tony Covington	CB	Virginia
10	57	Keith Conlin	OT	Penn State
11	64	Dante DePaola	CB	California
12	69	Henry Fields	RB	McNeese State
13	76	Jeff Wilner	TE	Wesleyan
14	81	Tyrone Rush	RB	North Alabama
15	88	Cornell Thomas	DE	West Georgia
16	93	Eric Carter	CB	Knoxville College
17	100	Vincent Landrum	LB	McNeese State
18	105	Ricky Blake	RB	Alabama A&M
19	112	Jason Pohopek	LB	Boston College
20	117	Vince Stewart	DT	Penn State
21	123	Robert Dougherty	QB	Boston University

== Personnel ==
=== Staff ===
1997 Barcelona Dragons staff
Front office: General manager – Jordi Vila-Puig; Deputy General Manager/Operations – Marco Fusté; Head coaches: Head coach – Jack Bicknell; Offensive coaches: Offensive coordinator/quarterbacks/Wide Receivers – Dick Curl; National coach/running backs – Juan Jiménez; Offensive line – Vince Martino	Defensive coaches: Defensive coordinator/linebackers – Red Kelin; Defensive line – Sam Clancy; Defensive backs – Chip Beake

=== Roster ===
1997 Barcelona Dragons final roster
Quarterbacks: 15 Stoney Case; 11 Robert Dougherty; 12 Jake Kelchner; 7 Jon Kitna; Running backs: 22 Michael Hicks; 34 Bruce Presley; 28 Terry Wilburn; Wide receivers: 80 Alfonzo Browning; 84 Tyree Davis; 82 Sheddrick Wilson; Tight ends: 89 Bryce Burnett; 45 Andy Fuller	Offensive linemen: 70 Chris Banks G; 72 Robert Couch G/T; 68 Chris Dausin C; 64 Everett Lindsay T; 78 Emerson Martin C; 62 Tom Robsock G; 77 Deron Thorp T; Defensive linemen: 96 Oliver Barnett DT; 93 Steve Brannon DE; 97 Mike Foley DT; 99 La'Roi Glover DT; 92 Hugh Hunter DE; 90 Carl Reeves DE; 55 Ronnie Woolfork DE	Linebackers: 56 Vincent Landrum MLB; 59 Juan Long MLB; 91 Eric Naposki OLB; 52 Willie Smith OLB; Defensive backs: 30 Carlos Brooks S; 24 Butler B'ynote' CB; 27 Dante DePaolo CB; 26 Rogerick Green CB; 29 Thomas McGaughey S; 25 Tristan Moss CB; 23 Don Robinson S; 21 Mark Washington CB; 20 Mike Wright CB; Special teams: 10 Jeff Beckley P; 8 Joe Wood K	National players: 86 (Finland) Sami Alalampi WR; 14 (Spain) Jesús Angoy K; 5 (Italy) Maurizio Barbotti WR; 75 (Italy) Luca Bellora DT; 66 (Spain) Ivan Imbernon DE; 36 (France) Gregoire Malo S; 58 (Mexico) Diego Martos OLB; 1 (Mexico) Marco Martos WR; Rookies in italics

== Schedule ==
Week	Date	Kickoff (Note: All times local to where the game was played.)	Opponent	Results		Game site	Attendance
Week	Date	Kickoff	Opponent	Final score	Team record	Game site	Attendance
1	Saturday, April 12	7:00 p.m.	at Rhein Fire	W 27–12	1–0	Rheinstadion	17,150
2	Sunday, April 20	3:00 p.m.	at Scottish Claymores	W 20–7	2–0	Murrayfield Stadium	14,877
3	Saturday, April 26	7:30 p.m.	Frankfurt Galaxy	L 10–17	2–1	Estadi Olímpic de Montjuïc	13,102
4	Sunday, May 4	3:00 p.m.	at London Monarchs	W 37–32	3–1	Stamford Bridge	10,110
5	Sunday, May 11	7:30 p.m.	Amsterdam Admirals	W 28–21	4–1	Estadi Olímpic de Montjuïc	14,152
6	Saturday, May 17	7:30 p.m.	London Monarchs	L 7–9	4–2	Estadi Olímpic de Montjuïc	13,514
7	Saturday, May 24	7:00 p.m.	at Amsterdam Admirals	L 21–26	4–3	Amsterdam ArenA	13,289
8	Saturday, May 31	7:30 p.m.	Rhein Fire	L 23–38	4–4	Estadi Olímpic de Montjuïc	13,670
9	Saturday, June 7	7:00 p.m.	at Frankfurt Galaxy	L 17–29	4–5	Waldstadion	40,743
10	Saturday, June 14	7:30 p.m.	Scottish Claymores	W 46–18	5–5	Estadi Olímpic de Montjuïc	10,523
World Bowl '97
11	Sunday, June 22	7:00 p.m.	Rhein Fire	W 38–24	6–5	Estadi Olímpic de Montjuïc	31,100

== Standings ==
World League of American Football
Team	W	L	T	PCT	PF	PA	Home	Road	STK
Rhein Fire	7	3	0	.700	206	146	3–2	4–1	W3
Barcelona Dragons	5	5	0	.500	236	209	2–3	3–2	W1
Scottish Claymores	5	5	0	.500	134	154	2–3	3–2	L2
Amsterdam Admirals	5	5	0	.500	156	160	4–1	1–4	W1
Frankfurt Galaxy	4	6	0	.400	147	142	3–2	1–4	L1
London Monarchs	4	6	0	.400	116	184	2–3	2–3	L1

== Game summaries ==
=== Week 1: at Rhein Fire ===
Week One: Barcelona Dragons at Rhein Fire – Game summary

Quarter	1	2	3	4	Total
Barcelona	7	14	6	0	27
Rhein	3	3	3	3	12

at Rheinstadion, Düsseldorf, Germany

- Date: Saturday, April 12
- Game time: 7:00 p.m. CEST
- Game attendance: 17,150

=== Week 3: vs Frankfurt Galaxy ===
Week Three: Frankfurt Galaxy at Barcelona Dragons – Game summary

Quarter	1	2	3	4	Total
Frankfurt	0	3	3	11	17
Barcelona	7	0	0	3	10

at Estadi Olímpic de Montjuïc, Barcelona, Spain

- Date: Saturday, April 26
- Game time: 7:30 p.m. CEST
- Game attendance: 13,102
- Referee: Ron Winter

=== Week 5: vs Amsterdam Admirals ===
Week Five: Amsterdam Admirals at Barcelona Dragons – Game summary

Quarter	1	2	3	4	Total
Amsterdam	0	0	14	7	21
Barcelona	14	7	0	7	28

at Estadi Olímpic de Montjuïc, Barcelona, Spain

- Date: Sunday, May 11
- Game time: 7:30 p.m. CEST
- Game attendance: 14,152

=== Week 7: at Amsterdam Admirals ===
Week Seven: Barcelona Dragons at Amsterdam Admirals – Game summary

Quarter	1	2	3	4	Total
Barcelona	7	0	14	0	21
Amsterdam	0	17	0	9	26

at Amsterdam ArenA, Amsterdam, Netherlands

- Date: Saturday, May 24
- Game time: 7:00 p.m. CEST
- Game attendance: 13,289

=== Week 8: vs Rhein Fire ===
Week Eight: Rhein Fire at Barcelona Dragons – Game summary

Quarter	1	2	3	4	Total
Rhein	7	14	7	10	38
Barcelona	0	9	7	7	23

at Estadi Olímpic de Montjuïc, Barcelona, Spain

- Date: Saturday, May 31
- Game time: 7:30 p.m. CEST
- Game attendance: 13,670

=== Week 9: at Frankfurt Galaxy ===
Week Nine: Barcelona Dragons at Frankfurt Galaxy – Game summary

Quarter	1	2	3	4	Total
Barcelona	10	0	0	7	17
Frankfurt	0	21	2	6	29

at Waldstadion, Frankfurt, Germany

- Date: Saturday, June 7
- Game time: 7:00 p.m. CEST
- Game attendance: 40,743

=== World Bowl '97 ===
World Bowl '97: Rhein Fire vs Barcelona Dragons – Game summary

Quarter	1	2	3	4	Total
Rhein	3	14	0	7	24
Barcelona	14	14	7	3	38

at Estadi Olímpic de Montjuïc, Barcelona, Spain

- Date: Sunday, June 22
- Game time: 7:00 p.m. CEST
- Game attendance: 31,100
- Referee: Phil Luckett
