= 1997 Rhein Fire season =

World League of American Football team season

- General manager: Alexander Leibkind
- Head coach: Galen Hall
- Home stadium: Rheinstadion

Results
- Record: 7–3
- Division place: 1st
- Playoffs: Lost World Bowl '97

The 1997 Rhein Fire season was the third season for the franchise in the World League of American Football (WLAF). The team was led by head coach Galen Hall in his third year, and played its home games at Rheinstadion in Düsseldorf, Germany. They finished the regular season in first place with a record of seven wins and three losses, marking the first winning season in franchise history. In World Bowl '97, Rhein lost to the Barcelona Dragons 38–24. Quarterback T. J. Rubley earned all-World League honors and was named the league's offensive most valuable player.

== Offseason ==
=== World League draft ===
1997 Rhein Fire World League draft selections
Draft order		Player name	Position	College
Round	Choice	Player name	Position	College
1	1	Israel Stanley	DE	Arizona State
2	7	Artis Houston	CB	California
3	18	Thomas Bailey	WR	Auburn
4	19	Scotty Lewis	DE	Baylor
5	30	David Merritt	LB	North Carolina State
6	31	John Anderson	S	Oklahoma
7	42	David Rhodes	WR	Central Florida
8	43	Pete Shufelt	LB	UTEP
9	54	Anthony Daigle	RB	Fresno State
10	55	Sean Foster	WR	Long Beach State
11	66	Chris Shelling	CB	Auburn
12	67	Ricky Powers	RB	Michigan
13	78	Kelly Wiltshire	CB	James Madison
14	79	Earl Mackey	LB	Southern
15	90	Mark Brook	LB	Wyoming
16	91	Don Robinson	CB	Kentucky
17	102	Will Brown	LB	Alabama
18	103	Kyle Richardson	P	Arkansas State
19	114	Chris Thomas	WR	Cal Poly
20	115	Jay Barry	RB	Washington

== Personnel ==
=== Staff ===
1997 Rhein Fire staff
Front office: General Manager – Alexander Leibkind; Head coaches: Head Coach/Running Backs – Galen Hall; Offensive coaches: Offensive Coordinator/Quarterbacks – Ken Karcher; Wide Receivers – Wes Chandler; Offensive Line – Bob Lord	Defensive coaches: Defensive Coordinator/Linebackers – Pete Kuharchek; National Coach/Defensive Line – Walter Rohlfing; Defensive Backs/Special Teams – Steve Carson

=== Roster ===
1997 Rhein Fire final roster
Quarterbacks: 13 Mike Groh; 7 Josh LaRocca; 12 T. J. Rubley; Running backs: 26 Ontiwaun Carter; 43 Derrick Clark; 44 Ricky Powers; Wide receivers: 18 Thomas Bailey; 80 Michael Dritlein; 5 Sean Foster; 81 David Rhodes; 84 Bill Schroeder; Tight ends: 88 A. J. Ofodile	Offensive linemen: 79 Ethan Brooks T; 70 Spencer Folau T; 62 John Jones G; 55 Bob Kronenberg C; 64 Leslie Ratliffe G/T; 77 Mike Sheldon G; 68 Barry Stokes G/T; 69 Thomas Vollath G; 73 Keith Wagner T; Defensive linemen: 98 Dunstan Anderson DE; 63 Buster Stanley DT; 90 Israel Stanley DE; 99 Tyrone Williams DT; 74 James Wilson DE	Linebackers: 53 Aubrey Beavers OLB; 56 Mark Brook OLB; 52 Will Brown OLB; 50 Anthony Fieldings MLB; 51 David Merritt OLB; 54 Pete Shufelt MLB (IR); Defensive backs: 19 John Anderson S; 22 Lee Cole CB; 40 Matt Gay S; 28 Myron Glass CB; 33 Artis Houston CB; 30 Chris Shelling S; 29 Michael Swift CB; Special teams: 2 Atle Larsen K; 3 Kyle Richardson P	National players: 10 (Germany) Manfred Burgsmüller K; 82 (Germany) Martin Driever TE; 75 (Germany) Peter Gross-Pass DT; 71 (Germany) Olaf Hampel G; 94 (Japan) Takahiro Ikenoue MLB; 78 (Germany) Vladimir Ilic DE; 8 (Germany) Babak Movassaghi WR; Rookies in italics

== Schedule ==
Week	Date	Kickoff (Note: All times local to where the game was played.)	Opponent	Results		Game site	Attendance
Week	Date	Kickoff	Opponent	Final score	Team record	Game site	Attendance
1	Saturday, April 12	7:00 p.m.	Barcelona Dragons	L 12–27	0–1	Rheinstadion	17,150
2	Sunday, April 20	3:00 p.m.	London Monarchs	W 28–6	1–1	Rheinstadion	14,876
3	Sunday, April 27	3:00 p.m.	at Scottish Claymores	W 23–10	2–1	Murrayfield Stadium	11,166
4	Saturday, May 3	7:00 p.m.	at Amsterdam Admirals	L 20–23	2–2	Amsterdam ArenA	10,698
5	Saturday, May 10	7:00 p.m.	Frankfurt Galaxy	W 10–7	3–2	Rheinstadion	32,140
6	Saturday, May 17	7:00 p.m.	at Frankfurt Galaxy	W 21–20	4–2	Waldstadion	39,182
7	Sunday, May 25	3:00 p.m.	Scottish Claymores	L 20–23	4–3	Rheinstadion	20,498
8	Saturday, May 31	7:30 p.m.	at Barcelona Dragons	W 38–23	5–3	Estadi Olímpic de Montjuïc	13,670
9	Saturday, June 7	7:00 p.m.	Amsterdam Admirals	W 24–0	6–3	Rheinstadion	23,697
10	Sunday, June 15	3:00 p.m.	at London Monarchs	W 10–7	7–3	Stamford Bridge	10,462
World Bowl '97
11	Sunday, June 22	7:00 p.m.	Barcelona Dragons	L 24–38	7–4	Estadi Olímpic de Montjuïc	31,100

== Standings ==
World League of American Football
Team	W	L	T	PCT	PF	PA	Home	Road	STK
Rhein Fire	7	3	0	.700	206	146	3–2	4–1	W3
Barcelona Dragons	5	5	0	.500	236	209	2–3	3–2	W1
Scottish Claymores	5	5	0	.500	134	154	2–3	3–2	L2
Amsterdam Admirals	5	5	0	.500	156	160	4–1	1–4	W1
Frankfurt Galaxy	4	6	0	.400	147	142	3–2	1–4	L1
London Monarchs	4	6	0	.400	116	184	2–3	2–3	L1

== Game summaries ==
=== Week 1: vs Barcelona Dragons ===
Week One: Barcelona Dragons at Rhein Fire – Game summary

Quarter	1	2	3	4	Total
Barcelona	7	14	6	0	27
Rhein	3	3	3	3	12

at Rheinstadion, Düsseldorf, Germany

- Date: Saturday, April 12
- Game time: 7:00 p.m. CEST
- Game attendance: 17,150

=== Week 2: vs London Monarchs ===
Week Two: London Monarchs at Rhein Fire – Game summary

Quarter	1	2	3	4	Total
London	0	0	0	6	6
Rhein	0	0	14	14	28

at Rheinstadion, Düsseldorf, Germany

- Date: Sunday, April 20
- Game time: 3:00 p.m. CEST
- Game attendance: 14,876

=== Week 3: at Scottish Claymores ===
Week Three: Rhein Fire at Scottish Claymores – Game summary

Quarter	1	2	3	4	Total
Rhein	13	0	7	3	23
Scotland	0	0	3	7	10

at Murrayfield Stadium, Edinburgh, Scotland

- Date: Sunday, April 27
- Game time: 3:00 p.m. BST
- Game attendance: 11,166

=== Week 4: at Amsterdam Admirals ===
Week Four: Rhein Fire at Amsterdam Admirals – Game summary

Quarter	1	2	3	4	Total
Rhein	0	6	7	7	20
Amsterdam	10	0	6	7	23

at Amsterdam ArenA, Amsterdam, Netherlands

- Date: Saturday, May 3
- Game time: 7:00 p.m. CEST
- Game attendance: 10,698

=== Week 5: vs Frankfurt Galaxy ===
Week Five: Frankfurt Galaxy at Rhein Fire – Game summary

Quarter	1	2	3	4	Total
Frankfurt	0	7	0	0	7
Rhein	0	0	7	3	10

at Rheinstadion, Düsseldorf, Germany

- Date: Saturday, May 10
- Game time: 7:00 p.m. CEST
- Game attendance: 32,140
- Referee: Phil Luckett

=== Week 6: at Frankfurt Galaxy ===
Week Six: Rhein Fire at Frankfurt Galaxy – Game summary

Quarter	1	2	3	4	Total
Rhein	0	14	0	7	21
Frankfurt	3	7	7	3	20

at Waldstadion, Frankfurt, Germany

- Date: Saturday, May 17
- Game time: 7:00 p.m. CEST
- Game attendance: 39,182

=== Week 7: vs Scottish Claymores ===
Week Seven: Scottish Claymores at Rhein Fire – Game summary

Quarter	1	2	3	4	Total
Scotland	7	0	0	16	23
Rhein	3	10	7	0	20

at Rheinstadion, Düsseldorf, Germany

- Date: Sunday, May 25
- Game time: 3:00 p.m. CEST
- Game attendance: 20,498

=== Week 8: at Barcelona Dragons ===
Week Eight: Rhein Fire at Barcelona Dragons – Game summary

Quarter	1	2	3	4	Total
Rhein	7	14	7	10	38
Barcelona	0	9	7	7	23

at Estadi Olímpic de Montjuïc, Barcelona, Spain

- Date: Saturday, May 31
- Game time: 7:30 p.m. CEST
- Game attendance: 13,670

=== Week 9: vs Amsterdam Admirals ===
Week Nine: Amsterdam Admirals at Rhein Fire – Game summary

Quarter	1	2	3	4	Total
Amsterdam	0	0	0	0	0
Rhein	7	10	0	7	24

at Rheinstadion, Düsseldorf, Germany

- Date: Saturday, June 7
- Game time: 7:00 p.m. CEST
- Game attendance: 23,697

=== Week 10: at London Monarchs ===
Week Ten: Rhein Fire at London Monarchs – Game summary

Quarter	1	2	3	4	Total
Rhein	0	3	7	0	10
London	0	7	0	0	7

at Stamford Bridge, London, England

- Date: Sunday, June 15
- Game time: 3:00 p.m. BST
- Game attendance: 10,462
- Referee: Phil Luckett

=== World Bowl '97 ===
World Bowl '97: Rhein Fire vs Barcelona Dragons – Game summary

Quarter	1	2	3	4	Total
Rhein	3	14	0	7	24
Barcelona	14	14	7	3	38

at Estadi Olímpic de Montjuïc, Barcelona, Spain

- Date: Sunday, June 22
- Game time: 7:00 p.m. CEST
- Game attendance: 31,100
- Referee: Phil Luckett

== Awards ==
After the completion of the regular season, the All-World League team was selected by members of the media. Overall, Rhein had six players selected. The selections were:

- T. J. Rubley, quarterback
- Bill Schroeder, wide receiver
- Ethan Brooks, offensive tackle
- Mike Sheldon, guard
- Bob Kronenberg, center
- Spencer Folau, offensive tackle

Additionally, Rubley was selected offensive MVP by the six World League head coaches. Galen Hall earned Coach of the Year honors.
