= 1997 Frankfurt Galaxy season =

World League of American Football team season

- General manager: Chris Heyne
- Head coach: Ernie Stautner
- Home stadium: Waldstadion

Results
- Record: 4–6
- Division place: 5th
- Playoffs: did not qualify

Frankfurt Galaxy played their fifth season in the World League of American Football (WLAF) in 1997. The team was led by head coach Ernie Stautner in his third year, and played its home games at Waldstadion in Frankfurt, Germany. They finished the regular season in fifth place with a record of four wins and six losses.

== Offseason ==
=== World League draft ===
1997 Frankfurt Galaxy World League draft selections
Draft order		Player name	Position	College
Round	Choice	Player name	Position	College
1	5	Joe Garten	C	Colorado
2	11	Ashley Sheppard	LB	Clemson
3	14	Beno Bryant	RB	Washington
4	23	Shawn Banks	LB	Texas Tech
5	26	Tommy Johnson	CB	Alabama
6	35	Travis Hannah	WR	USC
7	38	Jamie Coleman	CB	Appalachian State
8	47	Darren Reese	G	Ohio
9	50	Warner Smith	G	Arizona
10	59	Thomas McLemore	TE	Southern
11	62	Steve Keim	G	North Carolina State
12	71	Tuineau Alipate	LB	Washington State
13	74	Vince Marrow	TE	Toledo
14	83	Rogerick Green	CB	Kansas State
15	86	Vernon Turner	RB	Carson–Newman
16	95	Bruce Walker	DT	UCLA
17	98	John Morton	WR	Western Michigan
18	107	David Webb	LB	USC
19	110	Ronald Cherry	T	McNeese State
20	119	Jeff Rodgers	DE	Texas A&M–Kingsville
21	121	Dennis Allen	S	Texas A&M
22	127	Eddie Blake	G	Auburn
23	128	Mike Middleton	CB	Indiana
24	131	Richard DeFelice	K	North Texas

== Personnel ==
=== Staff ===
1997 Frankfurt Galaxy (NFL Europe) staff
Front office: General Manager – Chris Heyne; Deputy General Manager – Tilman Engel; Head coaches: Head Coach – Ernie Stautner; Offensive coaches: Offensive Coordinator/Quarterbacks/Wide Receivers – John Payne; Running Backs – Eric Carter; Offensive Line – Rod Humenuik; National Coach/Offensive Line Assistant – Alessandro Cinelli	Defensive coaches: Defensive Coordinator/Defensive Line – Ray Woodard; Linebackers – John Paul Young; Defensive Backs – Gary DeLoach

=== Roster ===
1997 Frankfurt Galaxy final roster
Quarterbacks: 14 Brad Bretz; 18 Robert Higgins; 5 Chad May; 16 Steve Pelluer (IR); Running backs: 19 Jim Kitts; 20 Vernon Turner; 30 Bobby Phillips; Wide receivers: 81 Mario Bailey (IR); 80 Travis Hannah; 88 John Morton; 8 Jason Shelley; 84 A.C. Tellison; Tight ends: 85 Vince Marrow	Offensive linemen: 70 David Bailey G; 65 Ron Collins T; 66 Joe Garten C; 71 Shawn Harper T; 69 Jon Heidenreich G; 55 Nate Miller G; 74 Andrew Moore T; Defensive linemen: 63 Jon Baker DE; 96 Scotty Lewis DE; 90 Don Reynolds DE; 97 Oscar Sturgis DE; 91 Bruce Walker NT	Linebackers: 56 Tuineau Alipate ILB; 50 Shawn Banks ILB; 51 Andre Bowden OLB; 57 Hillary Butler ILB; 92 Jeff Rodgers OLB; 93 David Webb OLB; Defensive backs: 42 Johnny Dixon S; 22 Cecil Doggette CB; 43 Greg Evans S; 32 Chris Hall S; 21 Jackie Kellogg CB; 39 Barron Miles CB (IR); Special teams: 2 Scott Player P	National players: 67 (Germany) Stefan Gamlin T; 59 (Spain) Dani Garcia MLB; 94 (Germany) Raphael Graetz OLB; 11 (Germany) Jörg Heckenbach WR; 86 (Germany) Werner Hippler TE; 9 (Germany) Ralf Kleinmann K; 99 (Germany) Frank Messmer NT; 26 (Germany) Volker Schenk S (IR); 24 (Germany) Ingo Seibert RB; Rookies in italics

== Schedule ==
Week	Date	Kickoff (Note: All times local to where the game was played.)	Opponent	Results		Game site	Attendance
Week	Date	Kickoff	Opponent	Final score	Team record	Game site	Attendance
1	Sunday, April 13	3:00 p.m.	at London Monarchs	L 7–14	0–1	Stamford Bridge	10,718
2	Saturday, April 19	7:00 p.m.	Amsterdam Admirals	W 19–10	1–1	Waldstadion	31,729
3	Saturday, April 26	7:30 p.m.	at Barcelona Dragons	W 17–10	2–1	Estadi Olímpic de Montjuïc	13,102
4	Saturday, May 3	7:00 p.m.	Scottish Claymores	L 3–9	2–2	Waldstadion	32,690
5	Saturday, May 10	7:00 p.m.	at Rhein Fire	L 7–10	2–3	Rheinstadion	32,140
6	Saturday, May 17	7:00 p.m.	Rhein Fire	L 20–21	2–4	Waldstadion	39,182
7	Saturday, May 24	7:00 p.m.	London Monarchs	W 31–7	3–4	Waldstadion	30,723
8	Sunday, June 1	3:00 p.m.	at Scottish Claymores	L 7–24	3–5	Murrayfield Stadium	11,618
9	Saturday, June 7	7:00 p.m.	Barcelona Dragons	W 29–17	4–5	Waldstadion	40,743
10	Saturday, June 14	7:00 p.m.	at Amsterdam Admirals	L 7–20	4–6	Amsterdam ArenA	19,486

== Standings ==
World League of American Football
Team	W	L	T	PCT	PF	PA	Home	Road	STK
Rhein Fire	7	3	0	.700	206	146	3–2	4–1	W3
Barcelona Dragons	5	5	0	.500	236	209	2–3	3–2	W1
Scottish Claymores	5	5	0	.500	134	154	2–3	3–2	L2
Amsterdam Admirals	5	5	0	.500	156	160	4–1	1–4	W1
Frankfurt Galaxy	4	6	0	.400	147	142	3–2	1–4	L1
London Monarchs	4	6	0	.400	116	184	2–3	2–3	L1

== Game summaries ==
=== Week 1: at London Monarchs ===
Week One: Frankfurt Galaxy at London Monarchs – Game summary

Quarter	1	2	3	4	Total
Frankfurt	7	0	0	0	7
London	0	6	6	2	14

at Stamford Bridge, London, England

- Date: Sunday, April 13
- Game time: 3:00 p.m. BST
- Game attendance: 10,718
- Referee: Bill Carollo

=== Week 2: vs Amsterdam Admirals ===
Week Two: Amsterdam Admirals at Frankfurt Galaxy – Game summary

Quarter	1	2	3	4	Total
Amsterdam	0	3	7	0	10
Frankfurt	10	3	3	3	19

at Waldstadion, Frankfurt, Germany

- Date: Saturday, April 19
- Game time: 7:00 p.m. CEST
- Game attendance: 31,729
- Referee: Mike Pereira

=== Week 3: at Barcelona Dragons ===
Week Three: Frankfurt Galaxy at Barcelona Dragons – Game summary

Quarter	1	2	3	4	Total
Frankfurt	0	3	3	11	17
Barcelona	7	0	0	3	10

at Estadi Olímpic de Montjuïc, Barcelona, Spain

- Date: Saturday, April 26
- Game time: 7:30 p.m. CEST
- Game attendance: 13,102
- Referee: Ron Winter

=== Week 4: vs Scottish Claymores ===
Week Four: Scottish Claymores at Frankfurt Galaxy – Game summary

Quarter	1	2	3	4	Total
Scotland	3	0	0	6	9
Frankfurt	0	3	0	0	3

at Waldstadion, Frankfurt, Germany

- Date: Saturday, May 3
- Game time: 7:00 p.m. CEST
- Game attendance: 32,690
- Referee: Walt Coleman

=== Week 5: at Rhein Fire ===
Week Five: Frankfurt Galaxy at Rhein Fire – Game summary

Quarter	1	2	3	4	Total
Frankfurt	0	7	0	0	7
Rhein	0	0	7	3	10

at Rheinstadion, Düsseldorf, Germany

- Date: Saturday, May 10
- Game time: 7:00 p.m. CEST
- Game attendance: 32,140
- Referee: Phil Luckett

=== Week 6: vs Rhein Fire ===
Week Six: Rhein Fire at Frankfurt Galaxy – Game summary

Quarter	1	2	3	4	Total
Rhein	0	14	0	7	21
Frankfurt	3	7	7	3	20

at Waldstadion, Frankfurt, Germany

- Date: Saturday, May 17
- Game time: 7:00 p.m. CEST
- Game attendance: 39,182

=== Week 7: vs London Monarchs ===
Week Seven: London Monarchs at Frankfurt Galaxy – Game summary

Quarter	1	2	3	4	Total
London	0	7	0	0	7
Frankfurt	6	11	0	14	31

at Waldstadion, Frankfurt, Germany

- Date: Saturday, May 24
- Game time: 7:00 p.m. CEST
- Game attendance: 30,723

=== Week 8: at Scottish Claymores ===
Week Eight: Frankfurt Galaxy at Scottish Claymores – Game summary

Quarter	1	2	3	4	Total
Frankfurt	0	0	0	7	7
Scotland	0	3	14	7	24

at Murrayfield Stadium, Edinburgh, Scotland

- Date: Sunday, June 1
- Game time: 3:00 p.m. BST
- Game attendance: 11,618

=== Week 9: vs Barcelona Dragons ===
Week Nine: Barcelona Dragons at Frankfurt Galaxy – Game summary

Quarter	1	2	3	4	Total
Barcelona	10	0	0	7	17
Frankfurt	0	21	2	6	29

at Waldstadion, Frankfurt, Germany

- Date: Saturday, June 7
- Game time: 7:00 p.m. CEST
- Game attendance: 40,743

=== Week 10: at Amsterdam Admirals ===
Week Ten: Frankfurt Galaxy at Amsterdam Admirals – Game summary

Quarter	1	2	3	4	Total
Frankfurt	0	7	0	0	7
Amsterdam	0	7	13	0	20

at Amsterdam ArenA, Amsterdam, Netherlands

- Date: Saturday, June 14
- Game time: 7:00 p.m. CEST
- Game attendance: 19,486

== Awards ==
After the completion of the regular season, the All-World League team was selected by members of the media. Overall, Frankfurt had eight players selected. The selections were:

- Shawn Banks, linebacker
- Hillary Butler, linebacker
- Johnny Dixon, safety
- Cecil Doggette, cornerback
- Jack Kellogg, cornerback
- Ralf Kleinmann, placekicker
- Frank Messmer, defensive national player
- Bobby Phillips, running back
