= Matt Joyce (American football) =

American football player (born 1972)

No. 77, 73, 75
- Positions: Offensive tackle Guard

Personal information
- Born: March 30, 1972 (age 54); La Crosse, Wisconsin, U.S.
- Listed height: 6 ft 7 in (2.01 m)
- Listed weight: 300 lb (136 kg)

Career information
- High school: New York Military Academy (NY)
- College: Richmond
- NFL draft: 1994: undrafted

Career history
- Dallas Cowboys (1994)*; Cincinnati Bengals (1994)*; Seattle Seahawks (1995); Arizona Cardinals (1996–2000); → Scottish Claymores (1997); Detroit Lions (2001–2004)
- * Offseason or practice squad member only

Awards and highlights
- All-Yankee (1993); Second-team All-Yankee (1992)

Career NFL statistics
- Games played: 122
- Games started: 71
- Fumble recoveries: 4
- Stats at Pro Football Reference

Matt Joyce (born March 30, 1972) is an American former professional football player who was a guard and offensive tackle in the National Football League (NFL) for the Seattle Seahawks, Arizona Cardinals and Detroit Lions. He played college football for the Richmond Spiders.

== Early life and college ==
Joyce attended New York Military Academy where he practiced football, basketball and track. He was an All-Conference defensive lineman.

He accepted a scholarship from the University of Richmond, where he was a three-year starter at defensive tackle.

== Professional career ==
=== Dallas Cowboys ===
Joyce was not selected in the 1994 NFL draft and was signed as an undrafted free agent by the Dallas Cowboys, with the intention of converting him into an offensive lineman.

He was waived on August 28, but after being claimed by the Cincinnati Bengals and not passing their physical, he was signed to the Cowboys practice squad.

=== Seattle Seahawks ===
On March 1, 1995, he signed as a free agent with the Seattle Seahawks and started the first 13 games at left guard. He was released on August 25, 1996.

=== Arizona Cardinals ===
On December 2, 1996, he signed as a free agent with the Arizona Cardinals. At the end of the season, he was assigned to the Scottish Claymores of the World League of American Football (WLAF).

The next year, he started the last 6 games at left guard, after missing the first 7 games with a sprained knee. In 1998, he was a backup and special teams player.

In 1999, he started 9 games at left tackle and the last 6 at left guard, after L. J. Shelton was moved into the starting lineup. The next year, he started 13 games at left guard and was inactive 3 games with a back injury.

=== Detroit Lions ===
On April 26, 2001, he signed as a free agent with the Detroit Lions. He started 11 games at right tackle and one at left guard. The next year, he started 3 games at right tackle and 3 at left guard. In 2003, he started the last 3 games at left guard in place of an injured Eric Beverly

He was released on April 21, 2005, to make room for Kyle Kosier.
