= Keith Powe =

American gridiron football player (born 1969)

No. 95
- Position: Defensive end

Personal information
- Born: June 5, 1969 (age 57); Biloxi, Mississippi
- Listed height: 6 ft 3 in (1.91 m)
- Listed weight: 285 lb (129 kg)

Career information
- High school: Jersey Village (TX)
- College: Lamar (1987–1989); UTEP (1990)

Career history
- Dallas Cowboys (1991)*; BC Lions (1992–1993); Toronto Argonauts (1993); Dallas Cowboys (1994)*; Tampa Bay Buccaneers (1994–1995); Scottish Claymores (1997); Winnipeg Blue Bombers (1997)
- * Offseason or practice squad member only

Awards and highlights
- Second-team All-WAC (1990)
- Stats at Pro Football Reference

Keith Alonzo Powe (born June 5, 1969) is an American former football defensive end. He played for the BC Lions from 1991 to 1993, the Toronto Argonauts in 1993, the Tampa Bay Buccaneers from 1994 to 1995 and for the Winnipeg Blue Bombers in 1997.
