= 1997 London Monarchs season =

World League of American Football team season

- General manager: Alton Byrd
- Head coach: Lionel Taylor
- Home stadium: Stamford Bridge

Results
- Record: 4–6
- Division place: 6th
- Playoffs: Did not qualify

The 1997 London Monarchs season was the fifth season for the franchise in the World League of American Football (WLAF). The team was led by head coach Lionel Taylor in his second year, and played its home games at Stamford Bridge in London, England. They finished the regular season in sixth place with a record of four wins and six losses.

== Offseason ==
=== World League draft ===
1997 London Monarchs World League draft selections
| Draft order | | Player name | Position | College |
| Round | Choice | Player name | Position | College |
|---|---|---|---|---|
| 1 | 2 | Ben Williams | DT | Minnesota |
| 2 | 8 | Avrom Smith | RB | New Hampshire |
| 3 | 17 | George Harris | S | Kentucky |
| 4 | 20 | Andre Bowden | LB | Fayetteville State |
| 5 | 29 | Tony Hargain | WR | Oregon |
| 6 | 32 | Joe King | CB | Oklahoma State |
| 7 | 41 | Ryan McCoy | LB | Houston |
| 8 | 44 | Brandon Moore | T | Duke |
| 9 | 53 | John Stonehouse | P | USC |
| 10 | 56 | Tommy Fagan | DE | Northeast Louisiana |
| 11 | 65 | Brian Collins | TE | Texas Christian |
| 12 | 68 | Reggie Holt | S | Wisconsin |
| 13 | 77 | Ed Hobbs | RB | Albany State |
| 14 | 80 | Jason Stinson | C | Louisville |
| 15 | 89 | Mario Bradley | CB | USC |
| 16 | 92 | Barry Rose | WR | Wisconsin–Stevens Point |
| 17 | 101 | Johnnie Williams | S | Miami (Ohio) |
| 18 | 104 | Linzy Collins | WR | Missouri |
| 19 | 113 | Fritz Fequiere | G | Iowa |
| 20 | 116 | Malcolm Showell | DE | Delaware State |
| 21 | 124 | Greg Smith | WR | Western Colorado |
| 22 | 125 | Brian Greenfield | P | Pittsburgh |

== Personnel ==
=== Staff ===
1997 London Monarchs staff
| Front office: General manager – Alton Byrd; Head coaches: Head coach/offensive Coordinator – Lionel Taylor; Offensive coaches: Offensive Run Coordinator/offensive line – Bob Mischak; National coach/running backs – Tony Allen | Defensive coaches: Defensive coordinator/linebackers – Dan Radakovich; Defensive line – Dennis Danielson; Defensive backs – Sam Jenkins; Special teams coaches: Special teams – Bob Gates |

=== Roster ===
1997 London Monarchs final roster
| Quarterbacks: 1 Frank Costa; 8 Preston Jones; 12 Kerry Joseph (IR); 13 Charles Puleri; 11 Stan White; Running backs: 33 Ron Dickerson; 45 Ed Hobbs; 24 Avrom Smith; 35 Tony Vinson (IR); Wide receivers: 10 Alan Allen; 88 Terence Davis; 84 Toderick Malone; 19 Larry Stallworth; 26 Ronnie West; Tight ends: 87 Steve Brooks; 82 Michael Titley | Offensive linemen: 74 Seth Dittman T; 67 Fritz Fequiere G; 79 Marc Lamb C; 71 Chris Luneburg T; 72 Derrick Turner T/G; 73 Pat Walsh T; 68 Terrence Wisdom G; Defensive linemen: 75 Jeff Hunter DE; 76 Emile Palmer DT; 95 Malcolm Showell DE; 78 Herman Smith DE; 96 Ben Williams DT | Linebackers: 59 Ed Burman OLB; 55 Ryan McCoy OLB; 94 Richard Newbill MLB; 54 John Solomon OLB; Defensive backs: 23 Mario Bradley CB; 25 Kevin Gaines S; 22 George Harris S; 36 Reggie Holt S; 28 Kenny McEntyre CB; 23 Claudius Wright CB; Special teams: 18 Brian Greenfield P; 2 Greg Ivy P; 5 Don Silvestri K | National players: 9 (England) Clive Allen K; 52 (England) Karl Ballard MLB; 21 (England) Rowelle Blenman CB; 81 (England) Jason Byworth WR; 66 (England) Lewis Capes DE; 64 (England) Tony MacKenzie G; 29 (England) Victor Muhammad RB; 91 (England) Tom Tovo DT; Rookies in italics |

== Schedule ==
| Week | Date | Kickoff (Note: All times local to where the game was played.) | Opponent | Results | | Game site | Attendance |
| Week | Date | Kickoff | Opponent | Final score | Team record | Game site | Attendance |
|---|---|---|---|---|---|---|---|
| 1 | Sunday, April 13 | 3:00 p.m. | Frankfurt Galaxy | W 14–7 | 1–0 | Stamford Bridge | 10,718 |
| 2 | Sunday, April 20 | 3:00 p.m. | at Rhein Fire | L 6–28 | 1–1 | Rheinstadion | 14,876 |
| 3 | Saturday, April 26 | 7:00 p.m. | at Amsterdam Admirals | L 6–34 | 1–2 | Amsterdam ArenA | 13,767 |
| 4 | Sunday, May 4 | 3:00 p.m. | Barcelona Dragons | L 32–37 | 1–3 | Stamford Bridge | 10,110 |
| 5 | Sunday, May 11 | 3:00 p.m. | Scottish Claymores | W 16–8 | 2–3 | Stamford Bridge | 11,210 |
| 6 | Saturday, May 17 | 7:30 p.m. | at Barcelona Dragons | W 9–7 | 3–3 | Estadi Olímpic de Montjuïc | 13,514 |
| 7 | Saturday, May 24 | 7:00 p.m. | at Frankfurt Galaxy | L 7–31 | 3–4 | Waldstadion | 30,723 |
| 8 | Sunday, June 1 | 3:00 p.m. | Amsterdam Admirals | L 9–13 | 3–5 | Stamford Bridge | 9,150 |
| 9 | Sunday, June 8 | 3:00 p.m. | at Scottish Claymores | W 10–9 | 4–5 | Murrayfield Stadium | 16,115 |
| 10 | Sunday, June 15 | 3:00 p.m. | Rhein Fire | L 7–10 | 4–6 | Stamford Bridge | 10,462 |

== Standings ==
World League of American Football
| Team | W | L | T | PCT | PF | PA | Home | Road | STK |
|---|---|---|---|---|---|---|---|---|---|
| Rhein Fire | 7 | 3 | 0 | .700 | 206 | 146 | 3–2 | 4–1 | W3 |
| Barcelona Dragons | 5 | 5 | 0 | .500 | 236 | 209 | 2–3 | 3–2 | W1 |
| Scottish Claymores | 5 | 5 | 0 | .500 | 134 | 154 | 2–3 | 3–2 | L2 |
| Amsterdam Admirals | 5 | 5 | 0 | .500 | 156 | 160 | 4–1 | 1–4 | W1 |
| Frankfurt Galaxy | 4 | 6 | 0 | .400 | 147 | 142 | 3–2 | 1–4 | L1 |
| London Monarchs | 4 | 6 | 0 | .400 | 116 | 184 | 2–3 | 2–3 | L1 |

== Game summaries ==
=== Week 1: vs Frankfurt Galaxy ===
Week One: Frankfurt Galaxy at London Monarchs – Game summary

| Quarter | 1 | 2 | 3 | 4 | Total |
|---|---|---|---|---|---|
| Frankfurt | 7 | 0 | 0 | 0 | 7 |
| London | 0 | 6 | 6 | 2 | 14 |

at Stamford Bridge, London, England

- Date: Sunday, April 13
- Game time: 3:00 p.m. BST
- Game attendance: 10,718
- Referee: Bill Carollo

=== Week 2: at Rhein Fire ===
Week Two: London Monarchs at Rhein Fire – Game summary

| Quarter | 1 | 2 | 3 | 4 | Total |
|---|---|---|---|---|---|
| London | 0 | 0 | 0 | 6 | 6 |
| Rhein | 0 | 0 | 14 | 14 | 28 |

at Rheinstadion, Düsseldorf, Germany

- Date: Sunday, April 20
- Game time: 3:00 p.m. CEST
- Game attendance: 14,876

=== Week 3: at Amsterdam Admirals ===
Week Three: London Monarchs at Amsterdam Admirals – Game summary

| Quarter | 1 | 2 | 3 | 4 | Total |
|---|---|---|---|---|---|
| London | 0 | 6 | 0 | 0 | 6 |
| Amsterdam | 7 | 13 | 0 | 14 | 34 |

at Amsterdam ArenA, Amsterdam, Netherlands

- Date: Saturday, April 26
- Game time: 7:00 p.m. CEST
- Game attendance: 13,767
- Referee: Walt Coleman

=== Week 7: at Frankfurt Galaxy ===
Week Seven: London Monarchs at Frankfurt Galaxy – Game summary

| Quarter | 1 | 2 | 3 | 4 | Total |
|---|---|---|---|---|---|
| London | 0 | 7 | 0 | 0 | 7 |
| Frankfurt | 6 | 11 | 0 | 14 | 31 |

at Waldstadion, Frankfurt, Germany

- Date: Saturday, May 24
- Game time: 7:00 p.m. CEST
- Game attendance: 30,723

=== Week 8: vs Amsterdam Admirals ===
Week Eight: Amsterdam Admirals at London Monarchs – Game summary

| Quarter | 1 | 2 | 3 | 4 | Total |
|---|---|---|---|---|---|
| Amsterdam | 7 | 0 | 0 | 6 | 13 |
| London | 0 | 0 | 3 | 6 | 9 |

at Stamford Bridge, London, England

- Date: Sunday, June 1
- Game time: 3:00 p.m. BST
- Game attendance: 9,150

=== Week 10: vs Rhein Fire ===
Week Ten: Rhein Fire at London Monarchs – Game summary

| Quarter | 1 | 2 | 3 | 4 | Total |
|---|---|---|---|---|---|
| Rhein | 0 | 3 | 7 | 0 | 10 |
| London | 0 | 7 | 0 | 0 | 7 |

at Stamford Bridge, London, England

- Date: Sunday, June 15
- Game time: 3:00 p.m. BST
- Game attendance: 10,462
- Referee: Phil Luckett

== Awards ==
After the completion of the regular season, the All-World League team was selected by members of the media. Overall, London had two players selected. The selections were:

- Richard Newbill, linebacker
- Malcolm Showell, defensive end
