= Brad Keeney =

American football player (born 1973)

No. 95, 92
- Position: Defensive tackle

Personal information
- Born: November 20, 1973 (age 52); Augusta, Georgia, U.S.
- Listed height: 6 ft 3 in (1.91 m)
- Listed weight: 294 lb (133 kg)

Career information
- High school: John T. Hoggard (Wilmington, North Carolina)
- College: The Citadel (1992–1995)
- NFL draft: 1996: undrafted

Career history
- Green Bay Packers (1996)*; Cincinnati Bengals (1996)*; New York Jets (1996); Atlanta Falcons (1997)*; New York Giants (1998)*; Detroit Lions (1998)*; Scottish Claymores (1997–1999); Jacksonville Jaguars (1999)*; Carolina Cobras (2000–2002); Buffalo Destroyers (2002–2003)
- * Offseason or practice squad member only
- Stats at Pro Football Reference

Brad O'Hara Keeney (born November 20, 1973) is an American former professional football player who was a defensive tackle for the New York Jets of the National Football League (NFL). He played college football for The Citadel Bulldogs. He also played for the Scottish Claymores of the World League of American Football (WLAF) and NFL Europe.

Keeney played for the Carolina Cobras of the Arena Football League as an OL/DL from 2000 to 2002. In 2002, Keeney was signed to the Buffalo Destroyers and released the following year in 2003.
