= James Logan (American football) =

American football player (born 1972)

No. 59, 52, 56
- Position: Linebacker

Personal information
- Born: December 6, 1972 (age 53); Opp, Alabama, U.S.
- Listed height: 6 ft 2 in (1.88 m)
- Listed weight: 222 lb (101 kg)

Career information
- High school: Opp
- College: Jones College (1991–1992); Memphis State (1993–1994)
- NFL draft: 1995: undrafted

Career history
- Houston Oilers (1995); Cincinnati Bengals (1995); Seattle Seahawks (1995–2000); → Scottish Claymores (1997)

Career NFL statistics
- Tackles: 91
- Sacks: 1
- Forced fumbles: 1
- Stats at Pro Football Reference

James Eddie Logan (born December 6, 1972) is an American former professional football player who was a linebacker for six seasons in the National Football League with the Cincinnati Bengals, Houston Oilers and Seattle Seahawks. Logan played college football at Jones County Junior College before tranaferring to the Memphis State Tigers. He was also a member of the Scottish Claymores of the World League of American Football (WLAF).

== Early life ==
James Eddie Logan was born on December 6, 1972, in Opp, Alabama. He played high school football at Opp High School in Opp. Logan was later honored at the Opp Chamber of Commerce banquet in May 2015.

== College career ==
Logan first played college football at Jones County Junior College from 1991 to 1992. He started ten games his freshman year in 1991, posting 43 solo tackles, 31 assisted tackles, one interception, and two fumble recoveries. He had 136 solo tackles, two fumble recoveries, and one interception return touchdown as a sophomore. He earned second-team All-MACJC honors and played in the Mississippi Junior College All-Star Football Classic. Logan also participated in track and field at Jones County Junior College. He was inducted into the Jones County Junior College Sports Hall of Fame in 2014.

Logan was then a two-year letterman for the Memphis State Tigers of Memphis State University from 1993 to 1994. He played in all 11 games in 1993, accumulating 14 solo tackles, 12 assisted tackles, and six sacks. He received Memphis State's Glenn Jones 12th Man Award in spring 1994. He recorded 34 solo tackles, ten assisted tackles, and one fumble recovery his senior year in 1994.

== Professional career ==
After going undrafted in the 1995 NFL draft, Logan signed with the Houston Oilers on May 3, 1995. He was waived by the Oilers on August 27 and signed to the team's practice squad on August 30. He was promoted to the active roster on September 15 and played in three games for the Oilers during the 1995 season, recording one solo tackle, before being waived on October 17, 1995.

Logan was claimed off waivers by the Cincinnati Bengals on October 18, 1995. He appeared in one game for the Bengals before being waived on October 31, 1995.

Logan was claimed off waivers by the Seattle Seahawks on November 1, 1995. He played in six games for the Seahawks that year. He appeared in six games in 1996 as well. In 1997, he was allocated to the World League of American Football (WLAF) to play for the Scottish Claymores. He totaled 37 defensive tackles, one special teams tackle, two forced fumbles, one interception, two pass breakups, and one blocked kick for the Claymores during the 1997 WLAF season. He played in 14 games, starting one, for the Seahawks during the 1997 NFL season, totaling two solo tackles, two assisted tackles, and one fumble recovery. Logan appeared in four games, starting one, in 1998, posting 12 solo tackles, five assisted tackles, and one sack before being placed on injured reserve on September 30, 1998. He became a free agent after the 1998 season and re-signed with the Seahawks on March 23, 1999. He played in all 16 games, starting two, during the 1999 season, recording 41 solo tackles, seven assisted tackles, one forced fumble, and one pass breakup. He also appeared in one playoff game that year, registering one solo tackle and one assisted tackle. Logan played in all 16 games for the second straight season in 2000, recording 18 solo tackles, and three assisted tackles. He became a free agent after the 2000 season.

== Personal life ==
Logan later became a teacher, high school football coach, and high school track coach.
