= Kevin Scott (cornerback) =

American football player (born 1969)

No. 38, 36, 3
- Position: Cornerback

Personal information
- Born: May 19, 1969 (age 57); Phoenix, Arizona, U.S.
- Listed height: 5 ft 9 in (1.75 m)
- Listed weight: 175 lb (79 kg)

Career information
- High school: St. Mary's (Phoenix)
- College: Stanford (1987–1990)
- NFL draft: 1991: 4th round, 91st overall pick

Career history
- Detroit Lions (1991–1994); Denver Broncos (1996)*; Scottish Claymores (1997); Chicago Bears (1997)*; Las Vegas Outlaws (2001); Detroit Fury (2001); Chicago Rush (2002); Toronto Argonauts (2003)
- * Offseason or practice squad member only

Awards and highlights
- First-team All-Pac-10 (1990)

Career NFL statistics
- Fumble recoveries: 1
- Stats at Pro Football Reference

Kevin Scott (born May 19, 1969) is an American former professional football player who was a cornerback for four seasons with the Detroit Lions of the National Football League (NFL). He played college football for the Stanford Cardinal, earning first-team All-Pac 10 honors as a defensive back. He was a four-year letterman for the Cardinal from 1987 to 1990.

Scott was chosen by the Lions with the 91st pick in the fourth round. He played four seasons with the Lions. His career included stops in Denver, Chicago, NFL Europe-Scotland Claymores, XFL-Las Vegas Outlaws, AFL-Detroit Fury and CFL-Toronto Argonauts.
