= Kyle Richardson (punter) =

American football player (born 1973)

No. 5, 10
- Position: Punter

Personal information
- Born: March 2, 1973 (age 53); Farmington, Missouri, U.S.

Career information
- College: Arkansas State
- NFL draft: 1996: undrafted

Career history
- Rhein Fire (1997); Miami Dolphins (1997); Seattle Seahawks (1997); Baltimore Ravens (1998–2001); Minnesota Vikings (2002); Philadelphia Eagles (2003)*; Cincinnati Bengals (2003–2004); Cleveland Browns (2005)
- * Offseason or practice squad member only

Awards and highlights
- Super Bowl champion (XXXV)

Career NFL statistics
- Punts: 572
- Punting yards: 23,489
- Punting average: 41.1
- Stats at Pro Football Reference

Kyle Davis Richardson (born March 2, 1973) is a former National Football League (NFL) punter. He played college football at Arkansas State University and went on to have a ten-year professional career. He played for the Rhein Fire in NFL Europe in 1996, the Miami Dolphins and Seattle Seahawks in 1997, the Baltimore Ravens from 1998 to 2001, the Minnesota Vikings in 2002, the Cincinnati Bengals from 2003 to 2004, and the Cleveland Browns in 2005. He won Super Bowl XXXV with the Ravens.

== Early life and college ==
Richardson attended high school at Farmington Senior High School. During his time at Farmington, he played football, basketball, and track. In his high school football career, Richardson played the positions of defensive back, punter, placekicker, and wide receiver, and was a three-year starter and All-conference/All-region member of the football team those three years.

== Professional career ==
Richardson was a member of the Baltimore Ravens team that won Super Bowl XXXV. He, along with New York Giants punter Brad Maynard, hold the record for most punts (both teams) in a Super Bowl with 21 punts. Maynard holds the individual record with 11 punts (38.4 yd/avg) and Richardson is second with 10 punts (43.0 yd/avg.).
