= Seymour "Red" Kelin =

American football coach

Biographical details
- Born: 1927; Newark, New Jersey, US
- Died: December 22, 2017 (aged 90); Boynton Beach, Florida, US

Coaching career (HC unless noted)
- 1963–1967: Arthur L. Johnson HS (NJ)
- 1968–1975: Connecticut (assistant)
- 1976–1980: Colgate (assistant)
- 1981–1990: Boston College (DC/LB)
- 1991–2001: Barcelona Dragons (DC/LB)

Accomplishments and honors

Championships
- World Bowl (1997)

Seymour "Red" Kelin (1927 – December 22, 2017) was an American football coach.

== Football career ==
Some of Kelin's coaching positions included head football coach at Arthur L. Johnson High School in Clark, New Jersey, as well as assistant coaching positions at the collegiate level at Colgate University, University of Connecticut, and Boston College. At the professional level, Kelin served as the defensive coordinator for the Barcelona Dragons, who were members of the NFL Europe, which folded following the 2007 season.

While at BC, Kelin served as Defensive Coordinator and helped lead the Eagles to a victory in the 1985 Cotton Bowl Classic. Notable players on the team included Heisman Trophy winner Doug Flutie, Bill Romanowski, and Gerard Phelan. During that Season, BC defeated Miami in the magical Hail Flutie game on a last second Hail Mary pass to secure a spot in the Cotton Bowl Classic.

Notable coaches that Kelin coached with or coached include Chris Palmer, Jack Bicknell, and Kirk Ferentz.
