= Scott Couper =

Scottish gridiron football player (born 1970)

Scott Couper (born 6 January 1970) is a Scottish former American football player. He played at wide receiver, most notably for the Scottish Claymores of NFL Europe

== Career ==
Couper's first experience of American football came with the amateur British American Football league, playing eight seasons for the Glasgow Lions. Couper also played for Strathclyde University's setup in the British Collegiate American Football League in 1991, going all the way to the playoffs.

=== Scottish Claymores ===
In 1995 he was signed by the newly founded Claymores to fulfill their contingent of National (non-American) players; NFL Europe rules required a number to be on the roster and at least one to compete in every other series of downs. Couper, wearing uniform number 81, played in nine of the Claymores' ten seasons of existence, initially retiring in 2001 before making a comeback in 2003. Couper amassed over 100 receptions and scored 10 touchdowns in his time with the club, and was voted the league-wide National Offensive Player of the Year in 1997. He played in two World Bowls with the Claymores, winning a World Bowl ring in World Bowl IV. Couper was statistically one of the most successful national players in the league.

Since the Claymores folded in 2004, he has continued to support American football programs in Scotland. Couper was inducted to the Claymores' Hall of Fame on 24 June 2006 as part of the tenth anniversary of the World Bowl in Scotland celebrations.

In 2012, he and his wife Jane won over £130,000 in television gameshow The Exit List.

=== Chicago Bears ===
On 27 July 1997, Couper was included on the Chicago Bears roster for one of the "American Bowl" preseason matches against the Pittsburgh Steelers at Croke Park, Dublin. Couper played one series late in the game, and was thrown to (but the pass was broken up) on third down.
