= Rowelle Blenman =

English gridiron football player (born 1967)

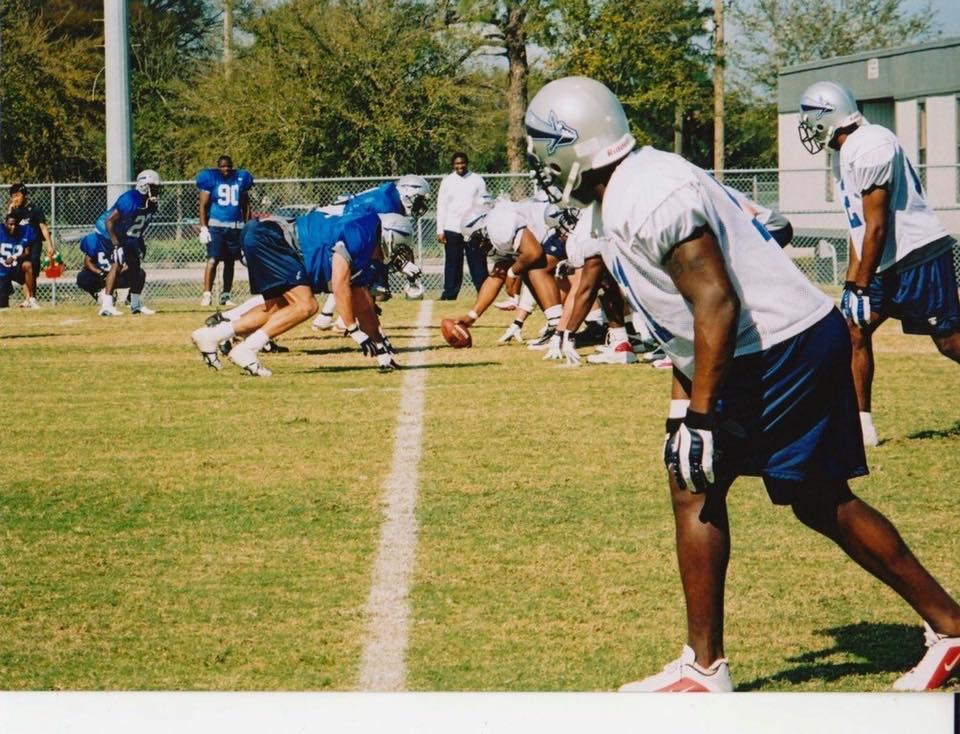

No. 30, 21
- Position: Cornerback

Personal information
- Born: December 31, 1967 (age 58); London, England
- Listed height: 5 ft 10 in (1.78 m)
- Listed weight: 190 lb (86 kg)

Career information
- College: Harper (1989–1992)

Career history
- London Ravens (1987–1989); London Olympians (1992–1997); London Monarchs (1995–1998); Scottish Claymores (1999–2003)

Awards and highlights
- 2× Eurobowl champion (1993, 1994); 4× Brit Bowl champion (1992, 1993, 1994, 1997); BAFL Hall of Fame (2021)

Rowelle Blenman (born December 31, 1967) is an English former American football cornerback who played nine seasons in NFL Europe for the London Monarchs and Scottish Claymores. He also played in the British American Football League (BAFL) with the London Ravens and London Olympians, helping the Olympians win the Eurobowl Championship in 1993 and 1994.
