= Chris Shelling =

American football player and coach (born 1972)

Alabama A&M Bulldogs
- Title: Assistant head coach & Defensive coordinator

Personal information
- Born: November 3, 1972 (age 54); Columbus, Georgia, U.S.

Career information
- College: Auburn
- NFL draft: 1995: undrafted

Career history

Playing
- Cincinnati Bengals (1995–1996); Rhein Fire (1997); Atlanta Falcons (1997); Rhein Fire (1998); Hamilton Tiger-Cats (1998–2000); Birmingham Thunderbolts (2001); Hamilton Tiger-Cats (2001–2003)

Coaching
- Troy (2007) Graduate assistant; Northeast Mississippi CC (2008–2009) Defensive assistant coach; Kossuth HS (MS) (2010–2013) Defensive coordinator; Holmes CC (2014–2015) Assistant coach; Holmes CC (2016–2017) Defensive coordinator; Alabama A&M (2018–2022) Outside linebackers coach & safeties coach; Miles (2023–2024) Defensive coordinator & defensive backs coach; Alabama A&M (2025-present) Assistant head coach & defensive coordinator

Awards and highlights
- World Bowl champion (1998); Grey Cup champion (87th); CFL East All-Star (2000, 2001); CFL All-Star (2001); First-team All-American (1994); 2× Second-team All-SEC (1993, 1994)
- Stats at Pro Football Reference

Christopher A. Shelling (born November 3, 1972) is an American college football coach and former player who is the defensive coordinator and defensive backs coach for Miles College, positions he has held since 2023. He played professionally as a defensive back and linebacker in the National Football League (NFL), World League of American Football (WLAF), Canadian Football League (CFL), and XFL

Shelling played college football for the Auburn Tigers, earning a first-team All-American honors in 1994. He then played for the Cincinnati Bengals and Atlanta Falcons of the NFL, the Rhein Fire of the WLAF, the Hamilton Tiger-Cats of the CFL, and the Birmingham Thunderbolts of the XFL.
