= Ron Florine =

American football player (born 1971)

No. 70, 78
- Position: Offensive tackle

Personal information
- Born: September 27, 1971 (age 55)
- Listed height: 6 ft 6 in (1.98 m)
- Listed weight: 305 lb (138 kg)

Career information
- High school: Marceline (MO)
- College: Central Missouri State
- NFL draft: 1995: undrafted

Career history
- Kansas City Chiefs (1995-1996)*; Houston Oilers (1996)*; Scottish Claymores (1997); Kansas City Chiefs (1997)*; Rhein Fire (1998)
- * Offseason or practice squad member only

Ron Florine (born September 27, 1971) is an American former football offensive tackle. He was on the practice squad for the Kansas City Chiefs and Houston Oilers of the NFL. He later played for the Scottish Claymores and Rhein Fire of WLAF/NFL Europe.

== College career ==
He started on the Central Missouri Mules offensive line at tackle and guard since his freshman year of 1990. In his senior year of 1994, the Mules set a school scoring average record with 30.4 points per game. This led to 1st Team MIAA honors, an All-American nod by Football Gazette, and a trip to the Snow Bowl, which was an NCAA D-II All Star game in Fargo, ND.

== Professional career ==
He signed as a rookie free agent with the Kansas City Chiefs practice squad for the 1995 season. In 1996, he made the Houston Oilers practice squad, but was waived only to be re-signed by the Chiefs. For the 1997 season, he was allocated to the WLAF team Scottish Claymores by the Chiefs. In 1998, he joined the Rhein Fire of the newly rebranded NFL Europe.
