= Steve Pelluer =

American gridiron football player (born 1962)

No. 16, 11
- Position: Quarterback

Personal information
- Born: July 29, 1962 (age 64); Yakima, Washington, U.S.
- Listed height: 6 ft 4 in (1.93 m)
- Listed weight: 204 lb (93 kg)

Career information
- High school: Interlake (Bellevue, Washington)
- College: Washington
- NFL draft: 1984: 5th round, 113th overall pick

Career history
- Dallas Cowboys (1984–1988); Kansas City Chiefs (1989–1991); Denver Broncos (1992)*; Winnipeg Blue Bombers (1995); Frankfurt Galaxy (1996–1997)
- * Offseason or practice squad member only

Awards and highlights
- Pac-10 Offensive Player of the Year (1983); First-team All-Pac-10 (1983)

Career NFL statistics
- Passing attempts: 974
- Passing completions: 548
- Completion percentage: 56.3%
- TD–INT: 29–39
- Passing yards: 6,870
- Passer rating: 71.6
- Rushing yards: 858
- Rushing touchdowns: 6
- Stats at Pro Football Reference

Steven Carl Pelluer (born July 29, 1962) is an American former professional football player who was a quarterback in the National Football League (NFL) for the Dallas Cowboys and Kansas City Chiefs. He was selected by the Cowboys in the 5th round of the 1984 NFL draft. He played college football for the Washington Huskies.

== Early life ==
Pelluer attended Interlake High School in Bellevue, Washington, a suburb east of Seattle, and lettered in football and basketball.

In football, he led his team to the state quarterfinals in his last two years. As a senior, he received All-state honors and was a National Football Foundation Scholar-Athlete.

== College career ==
Pelluer's family had a tradition of playing football at Washington State University in Pullman, but he instead accepted a scholarship from the rival University of Washington in Seattle.

As a sophomore in 1981 under head coach Don James, Pelluer took over the starting quarterback position, after Tim Cowan injured his thumb in the second game of the season. He finished with 110 of 234 completions, for 1,138 yards and 9 touchdowns, while leading the team to a Pacific-10 Conference title and a 28–0 win over the University of Iowa in the Rose Bowl on New Year's Day.

As a junior in 1982, even though his record was 7–1 and the team was ranked No. 1 in the nation, Pelluer lost the starting job to Cowan.

As a senior in 1983, he had one of the best quarterback seasons in school history, receiving All-Pac-10 and the conference's offensive player of the year honors, after completing a 67.2% of his passes (school record) for 2,365 yards and 11 touchdowns. He also set a school record with most consecutive passes completed (137) without an interception.

Pelluer left as the school's second career leader in passing yards with 4,603 passing yards, to go along with 436 completions (school record), 30 touchdowns, 342 rushing yards, 5,248 total yards (second in school history) and a 23–6 (.793) record.

== Professional career ==
=== Dallas Cowboys ===
Pelluer was selected by the Dallas Cowboys in the fifth round (113th overall) of the 1984 NFL draft. He also was selected by the Oakland Invaders in the sixth round (111th overall) of the 1984 USFL draft.

He was the third-string quarterback in his first two years. In 1985, with the first place in the NFC East division at stake, he was forced to enter a close game against the New York Giants and make his career debut, because both starting quarterback Danny White and backup Gary Hogeboom had been injured. Pelluer on his second series directed a 72-yard drive (which included a third-and-15 conversion) for the winning touchdown, leading the Cowboys to a victory that clinched the division title.

In 1986, he was named the backup quarterback after Hogeboom was traded. When White suffered a season-ending injury (broken wrist) in week 9 against the New York Giants, Pelluer nearly rallied the team after completing 28-of-38 passes for 339 yards. He started 6 out of the last 7 games, showing a strong arm and great mobility. In the 24–21 win against the San Diego Chargers, he was sacked a team record twelve times. In the 14–31 loss against the Seattle Seahawks, he set the franchise record for consecutive passes completed (14) without an incompletion. He struggled during the season, finishing with a 1–6 record, while being sacked 47 times and throwing 17 interceptions in 9 starts.

In 1987, he began the season as a backup, but took over White in Week 10 against the Miami Dolphins and started 4 out of the last 6 games. He finished with 94 straight passes without throwing an interception.

In 1988, at a low point in franchise history, he started 14 of the 16 games, passing for 3,139 yards, 17 touchdowns, rushing for 314 yards (second on the team) and 2 touchdowns, but the team finished just 3–13 (3–11 in his starts). In the seventh game against the Chicago Bears, while sliding feet first, a fierce hit by linebacker Mike Singletary forced him to leave the game with a concussion. In the eighth game against the Philadelphia Eagles, he completed 32 (second in team history) out of 46 passes for 342 yards. In the fifteenth game against the Washington Redskins, he passed for 333 yards and 3 touchdowns. In the 24–17 win, Pelluer was called for a false start when he jerked his head in an attempt to draw the Redskins offside. Pelluer complained to referee Jerry Markbreit, who replied, "You're jerking the shit out of it!" Markbreit did not realize his microphone was still on, and the obscenity was broadcast to the crowd at RFK Stadium and television viewers on CBS. He was the last quarterback to start and win a game for a Tom Landry-coached team, while becoming one of only 3 quarterbacks in franchise history to pass for more than 3,000 yards in a season, joining Roger Staubach (2 times) and Danny White (4 times).

In 1989, he asked to be traded, after Jimmy Johnson was hired as the new head coach and drafted two rookie quarterbacks (Troy Aikman and Steve Walsh). On October 17, he was traded to the Kansas City Chiefs in exchange for a third round draft choice in 1990 (#68-Ron Lewis) and a fourth round draft choice in 1991 (#106-Bill Musgrave).

=== Kansas City Chiefs ===
In 1989, he appeared in 5 regular season games with 3 starts. On November 5, he led his team to a 20–10 win against the Seattle Seahawks and tied a franchise record for rushing yards (69) by a quarterback.

In 1990, he appeared in 13 games with no starts, after Steve DeBerg established himself as the team starter during the preseason.

On August 7, 1991, he walked out of training camp, before returning on August 19. He was released on August 27 and later re-signed on December 17, to back up Mark Vlasic after DeBerg was injured.

=== Denver Broncos ===
On April 1, 1992, he was signed in Plan B free agency by the Denver Broncos. He was cut on August 18, before the start of the season.

=== Winnipeg Blue Bombers ===
In May 1995, Pelluer signed with the Winnipeg Blue Bombers of the Canadian Football League after being out of football for three years. He was lost for the season after dislocating his shoulder in the second game against the Birmingham Barracudas.

=== Frankfurt Galaxy ===
In 1996, he played with the Frankfurt Galaxy of the World League of American Football, reuniting with head coach Ernie Stautner, who was the defensive coordinator with the Dallas Cowboys. Pelluer was one of the three top quarterbacks in the league and helped his team reach the World Bowl. He returned the next year, but was a reserve player, before deciding to retire at the end of the season.

== Personal life ==
Pelluer's late brother, Scott, attended Washington State University and played linebacker for the New Orleans Saints.

== See also ==
- Washington Huskies football statistical leaders
