= Yo Murphy =

American gridiron football player and coach (born 1971)

No. 5, 80, 82, 88, 19, 83
- Position: Wide receiver

Personal information
- Born: May 11, 1973 (age 53); San Pedro, California, U.S.
- Listed height: 5 ft 10 in (1.78 m)
- Listed weight: 187 lb (85 kg)

Career information
- High school: Idaho Falls (ID)
- College: Idaho
- NFL draft: 1993: undrafted

Career history

Playing
- BC Lions (1993–1995); Scottish Claymores (1996); BC Lions (1996); Scottish Claymores (1997); Minnesota Vikings (1997–1998)*; Scottish Claymores (1999); Tampa Bay Buccaneers (1999); Minnesota Vikings (1999); Tampa Bay Buccaneers (2000)*; Las Vegas Outlaws (2001); St. Louis Rams (2001–2002); Kansas City Chiefs (2002); Ottawa Renegades (2003–2005); Saskatchewan Roughriders (2006–2007)
- * Offseason or practice squad member only

Coaching
- Jacksonville Breeze (2009–2015)

Awards and highlights
- 2× Grey Cup champion (1994, 2007); World Bowl MVP (IV)

Career NFL statistics
- Receptions: 9
- Receiving yards: 51
- Stats at Pro Football Reference

Llewellyn P. "Yo" Murphy (born May 11, 1973) is an American former professional football player of multiple leagues. He was originally signed by the BC Lions in the Canadian Football League (CFL) as an undrafted free agent in 1993; he played college football at Idaho. He has also coached.

== Early life ==
Murphy played high school football at Idaho Falls High School and graduated in 1989.

== College career ==
Murphy played college football at the University of Idaho in Moscow. One of the top pass-catchers in Idaho history, he nabbed 140 receptions during his Vandal career and gained 2,267 yards through the air. Murphy's career receptions rank seventh in Idaho history, while his yards rank fourth and his 17 career receiving touchdowns are tied for fifth. His best year was as a senior in 1992, when he was chosen first-team All-American by three publications, earned first-team All-Big Sky honors and Idaho Most Valuable Offensive Player honors. That season, he was second in Division I-AA with 68 grabs for 1,156 yards and nine touchdowns.

== Professional career ==
=== BC Lions ===
In 1993, he was signed by the BC Lions where he won the 1994 Grey Cup.

=== Scottish Claymores ===
Between 1995 and 1999, he starred at WR for the Scottish Claymores of NFL Europe. In 1996, he was named World Bowl MVP.

=== Tampa Bay Buccaneers ===
In 1999, he would play for the Tampa Bay Buccaneers as a wide receiver and on special teams.

=== Minnesota Vikings ===
Murphy also played for the Minnesota Vikings of the National Football League in 1999.

=== Las Vegas Outlaws ===
In 2001, Murphy played for the Las Vegas Outlaws of the XFL.

=== St. Louis Rams ===
Murphy signed with the St. Louis Rams of the NFL in 2001, where he went on to play in the Super Bowl. He caught a pass during the drive of the game tying touchdown pass from Kurt Warner in a 20–17 loss in Super Bowl XXXVI

=== Kansas City Chiefs ===
Murphy signed with the Kansas City Chiefs on December 17, 2002. He was inactive for one game before being released on December 27.

=== Ottawa Renegades ===
He signed with the Ottawa Renegades in 2003.

=== Saskatchewan Roughriders ===
He went undrafted in the 2006 CFL Dispersal Draft after the suspension of the Renegades' franchise, but signed with the Saskatchewan Roughriders in September 2006. He culminated his career as a member of the Riders' Grey Cup winning team in 2007.

== Retirement ==
On November 28, 2007, it was announced that Murphy had retired from professional football. Murphy is the only player ever to play in the regular seasons of the CFL, NFL, XFL and NFL Europe, as well as the only player to suit up for the Super Bowl, Grey Cup and World Bowl championship games.

Murphy is currently the co-owner of Performance Compound in Tampa, Florida, and was married in November 2014.
