= Oliver Barnett =

American football player (born 1966)

No. 77, 72, 96
- Positions: Defensive end, defensive tackle

Personal information
- Born: April 9, 1966 (age 60) [Auburn, AL]], U.S.
- Listed height: 6 ft 3 in (1.91 m)
- Listed weight: 288 lb (131 kg)

Career information
- College: Kentucky
- NFL draft: 1990: 3rd round, 55th overall pick

Career history
- Atlanta Falcons (1990–1992); Buffalo Bills (1993–1994); San Francisco 49ers (1995); Barcelona Dragons (1997)

Awards and highlights
- Third-team All-American (1989); First-team All-SEC (1989)

Career NFL statistics
- Tackles: 182
- Sacks: 5
- Touchdowns: 1
- Stats at Pro Football Reference

Oliver Wesley Barnett (born April 9, 1966) is an American former professional football player who was a defensive end in the National Football League (NFL) for the Atlanta Falcons, Buffalo Bills, and San Francisco 49ers. He was selected by the Falcons in the third round of the 1990 NFL draft. He currently is an assistant football coach at Henry Clay High School in Lexington, Kentucky.
