= Demetrice Martin =

American football player and coach (born 1973)

Current position
- Title: Senior Defensive Analyst
- Team: ASU
- Conference: Big Ten

Biographical details
- Born: February 28, 1973 (age 53); Los Angeles, California, U.S.
- Education: Michigan State University

Playing career
- 1992–1995: Michigan State

Coaching career (HC unless noted)
- 1999–2000: Monrovia HS
- 2001: John Muir HS
- 2001–2002: Pasadena City College (DB)
- 2003–2005: Mt. SAC (DB)
- 2006–2007: USC (GA)
- 2008: Mt. SAC (DC)
- 2009–2011: Washington (CB)
- 2012–2017: UCLA (DB)
- 2018–2019: Arizona (CB)
- 2020–2021: Colorado (CB)
- 2022–2023: Oregon (CB/PGC)
- 2024: Michigan State (CB)
- 2025: UCLA (CB)
- 2026-present: ASU (Analyst)

Accomplishments and honors

Championships
- Pac-12 South Division Champions (2012)

Awards
- Second-team All-Big Ten (1994)

Demetrice A. Martin (born February 28, 1973), nicknamed "Coach Meat" , is an American football coach. Currently, he is the senior defensive analyst at ASU and coaches the cornerbacks.

Martin played college football at Michigan State University as a wide receiver and cornerback from 1992 to 1995. Prior to his tenure at Oregon, he held various assistant coaching positions at Monrovia High School in Monrovia, California, John Muir High School in Pasadena, California, Pasadena City College, Mt. San Antonio College, the University of Southern California (USC), the University of Washington, University of California, Los Angeles (UCLA), University of Arizona and the University of Colorado Boulder.

== Playing career ==
=== High school ===
Martin prepped at Muir High School in Pasadena, California and was drafted by the Atlanta Braves in baseball, but elected to play football.

=== College ===
Martin played college football at Michigan State University where he was a four-year letterman (1992–95). He began as a wide receiver, then switched to cornerback; he was all-conference in 1994.

=== Professional ===
Martin played on the practice squad of the St. Louis Rams in the National Football League (1996), in NFL Europe for the Scottish Claymores (1997) and the Arena Football League's Texas Terror (1998–99).

== Coaching career ==
=== Early career ===
Martin began his coaching career as a high school coach in 1999 at Monrovia for two years and then at his alma mater Muir in 2001. He then coached at the junior college level for five years; two at Pasadena City College (2001–02) and three at Mt. San Antonio College (Mt. SAC) in Walnut (2003–05). He was a graduate secondary assistant coach at USC (2006–07),

=== Washington ===
In December 2008, Martin was hired as the cornerbacks coach at the University of Washington under head coach Steve Sarkisian.

=== UCLA ===
In December 2011, Martin joined the University of California, Los Angeles as their cornerbacks coach under head coach Jim Mora. He was let go after the 2017 season.

=== Arizona ===
Martin worked as the cornerbacks coach for Arizona in 2018 and 2019.

=== Colorado ===
Martin spent 2020 and 2021 as the cornerbacks coach for Colorado.

=== Oregon ===
It was announced that he would join Oregon for the 2022 as the team’s pass game coordinator and cornerbacks coach.
