= Spence Fischer =

American football player (born 1972)

No. 14
- Position: Quarterback

Personal information
- Born: November 30, 1972 (age 53); Atlanta, Georgia, U.S.
- Listed height: 6 ft 3 in (1.91 m)
- Listed weight: 218 lb (99 kg)

Career information
- High school: Lovett (Atlanta)
- College: Duke (1991–1995)
- NFL draft: 1996: 6th round, 203rd overall pick

Career history
- Pittsburgh Steelers (1996)*; Miami Dolphins (1997)*; → Scottish Claymores (1997)
- * Offseason or practice squad member only

Patrick Spencer Fischer (born November 30, 1972) is an American former football quarterback. He played college football for the Duke Blue Devils, and was selected by the Pittsburgh Steelers in the sixth round of the 1996 NFL draft.

== Early life ==
Patrick Spencer Fischer was born on November 30, 1972, in Atlanta, Georgia. He attended the Lovett School in Atlanta.

== College career ==
Fischer played college football for the Duke Blue Devils of Duke University. He was redshirted in 1991, and was a four-year letterman from 1992 to 1995. Through the first four games of the 1992 season, Fischer was the backup to Steve Prince. He took over as starter after Prince was benched. Fischer remained the primary starter for Duke from 1993 to 1995. He finished his college career with totals of 786 completions on 1,369 passing attempts (57.4%) for 9,021 yards, 48 touchdowns, and 46 interceptions while also rushing for 89 yards and seven touchdowns. Fischer also punted nine times for 417 yards. As of 2010, he ranked third in school history in the following passing categories: completions, attempts, yards, and touchdowns.

== Professional career ==
Fischer was selected by the Pittsburgh Steelers in the sixth round, with the 203rd overall pick, of the 1996 NFL draft. He was released on August 25 but signed to the Steelers' practice squad. He was released again on October 29, 1996.

Fischer signed with the Miami Dolphins on February 13, 1997. He was allocated to the World League of American Football (WLAF) to play for the Scottish Claymores during the 1997 WLAF season. He completed 78 of 148 passes (52.7%) for 839 yards, one touchdown, and six interceptions while rushing 21 times for 88 yards and one touchdown. Fischer also punted 13 times for 368 yards. He was released by the Dolphins on August 12, 1997.

== Personal life ==
Fischer worked in finance after his football career.
