= Vince Marrow =

American football player and coach (born 1968)

Louisville Cardinals
- Title: Executive Director of Player Personnel and Recruiting

Personal information
- Born: August 17, 1968 (age 58); Youngstown, Ohio, U.S.
- Listed height: 6 ft 3 in (1.91 m)
- Listed weight: 251 lb (114 kg)

Career information
- High school: Cardinal Mooney (Youngstown, Ohio)
- College: Toledo
- NFL draft: 1992: 11th round, 307th overall pick
- Expansion draft: 1995: 23rd round, 46th overall pick

Career history

Playing
- Buffalo Bills (1992)*; Kansas City Chiefs (1992–1993)*; Buffalo Bills (1993–1994); Carolina Panthers (1995)*; New York Jets (1996)*; Frankfurt Galaxy (1997–1998); Chicago Bears (1998)*; Orlando Rage (2001)*
- * Offseason or practice squad member only

Coaching
- Berlin Thunder (2006) Tight ends coach; Rhein Fire (2007) Tight ends coach; Toledo (2008) Tight ends coach; Springfield Local High School (2009) Head coach; Omaha Nighthawks (2010) Tight ends coach; Nebraska (2011–2012) Graduate assistant coach; Kentucky (2013–2025) Associate head coach & tight ends coach

Operations
- Louisville (2025–present) Executive Director of Player Personnel and Recruiting

Awards and highlights
- All-NFL Europe (1998)

Career NFL statistics
- Receptions: 5
- Receiving yards: 44
- Stats at Pro Football Reference

Vincent Charles Marrow (born August 17, 1968) is an American football executive, former coach, and former professional tight end. He is the Executive of Player Personnel and Development for the University of Louisville, a position he has held since June 2025.

== Early life ==
Marrow played basketball and football at Cardinal Mooney High School in Youngstown, Ohio.

== College career ==
Marrow played basketball at Youngstown State University for two years (1988–89). He transferred to the University of Toledo where he played in 11 games as a tight end in his final collegiate season. He was named to the All-Mid-American Conference second-team in 1991.

== Professional career ==
Marrow was drafted by the Buffalo Bills in the 11th round of the 1992 NFL draft (307th pick overall).

== Coaching career ==
Marrow was named tight ends coach for the Omaha Nighthawks of the United Football League on May 10, 2010.

Marrow spent two years (2011–12) as a graduate assistant at the University of Nebraska. Under long-term acquaintance Bo Pelini, Marrow served as a tutor to the tight ends. In 2012, Nebraska was granted a waiver from the NCAA to allow Marrow to recruit off campus while associate head coach Barney Cotton was unable to travel while recovering from surgery.

In December 2012, Marrow earned a full-time position as an assistant coach for the University of Kentucky under head coach Mark Stoops and received a promotion a year later to recruiting coordinator.

In June 2025, Marrow left the University of Kentucky and accepted a position at the University of Louisville officially titled as the Executive Director of Player Personnel and Recruiting. This position is more frequently referred to as "General Manager" in media reports.
