= Bronzell Miller =

American football player and entertainer (1971–2013)

No. 65, 36, 96
- Position: Defensive end

Personal information
- Born: October 12, 1971; Federal Way, Washington, U.S.
- Died: December 21, 2013 (aged 42); West Jordan, Utah, U.S.
- Listed height: 6 ft 4 in (1.93 m)
- Listed weight: 247 lb (112 kg)

Career information
- High school: Federal Way
- College: Eastern Arizona JC; Highline; Utah
- NFL draft: 1995: 7th round, 239th overall pick

Career history
- St. Louis Rams (1995)*; Jacksonville Jaguars (1995); Amsterdam Admirals (1997); Nashville Kats (1997); Calgary Stampeders (1997–1999); New York/New Jersey Hitmen (2001); Los Angeles Avengers (2001)
- * Offseason or practice squad member only

Awards and highlights
- Grey Cup champion (1998)

Career NFL statistics
- Tackles: 2
- Stats at Pro Football Reference

Career AFL statistics
- Tackles: 1
- Sacks: 1
- Stats at ArenaFan.com

Bronzell LaJames Miller (October 12, 1971 – December 21, 2013) was an American professional football player and entertainer. As a football player he played for the University of Utah in college and then a series of professional teams after being selected by the St. Louis Rams in 1995. He spent a season with the Jacksonville Jaguars in 1996, the Calgary Stampeders from 1997 to 2001 and ending with the Los Angeles Avengers of the Arena Football League (AFL) in 2001. As an actor he appeared in feature films including Bringing Down the House, Mr. 3000, Slow, The Luck of the Irish, as well as television shows and commercials. He also worked as a print model for the YMCA of Greater New York and performed voice work for Milwaukee Radio Group.

== College career ==
A two-sport athlete, Miller played both college basketball and football from 1990 to 1992 at Eastern Arizona Junior College and Highline Community College. He then was given a full scholarship at the University of Utah, where he played college football for the Utes in 1993–1994. Miller received several honors and played in the East-West Shrine Game and the Freedom Bowl. Miller participated in the Utes' November 19, 1994, win over Brigham Young University.

== Professional career ==
Miller was selected in the 1995 NFL draft by the St. Louis Rams as a linebacker. During the season, he left the Rams to join the Jacksonville Jaguars. Following his NFL years, Miller joined the Calgary Stampeders of the Canadian Football League, where he led his team to the Grey Cup Championship in 1998 playing defensive end. Miller retired from professional football in 2001, after a series of back and ankle injuries.

== Personal life ==
In 1991 while both attending the University of Utah, Bronzell met and married his first wife Marnie Oliver. They had 3 children Bronzell Jr., Breezell (engaged to Michael Rees) and Elijah (engaged to Lexy Stockton). He also had a step son Stetson. In 1999 the couple divorced and Bronzell moved to Minnesota where he met and married his second wife Jane Krohn in 2000. They were married for 10 years and had 5 children. Breonne, Isaiah, Aaliyah, Arielle and Isaac. Bronzell also has an older daughter Alesha from a college relationship. In July 2010, Bronzell was diagnosed with 3rd stage multiple myeloma. He underwent chemo, radiation, bone marrow transplants and several other treatments in an attempt to prolong his life. In December 2013 he returned to Utah with his first wife and children to receive hospice care for end stage cancer. Miller died at home with family on December 21, 2013, at the age of 42.
