= A. J. Ofodile =

American football player (born 1973)

A.J. Ofodile
Festus Tigers
- Title: Head coach

Personal information
- Born: October 9, 1973 (age 53); Detroit, Michigan, U.S.
- Listed height: 6 ft 6 in (1.98 m)
- Listed weight: 260 lb (118 kg)

Career information
- High school: Cass Technical (Detroit)
- College: Missouri
- NFL draft: 1994: 5th round, 158th overall pick

Career history

Playing
- Buffalo Bills (1994); Pittsburgh Steelers (1995-1996)*; Baltimore Ravens (1996–1999); Rhein Fire (1997); Memphis Maniax (2001)
- * Offseason or practice squad member only

Coaching
- Rock Bridge HS (MO) (2001–2002) Assistant coach & offensive coordinator; Rock Bridge HS (MO) (2003–2015) Head coach; Missouri (2016–2017) Recruiting coordinator; Missouri (2018–2019) Wide receivers coach; Festus HS (MO) (2020–present) Head coach

Awards and highlights
- First-team All-Big Eight (1993)

Career NFL statistics
- Receptions: 14
- Receiving yards: 171
- Touchdowns: 1
- Stats at Pro Football Reference

Anselm Aniagboso Ofodile Jr. (/oʊˈfɑːdɪleɪ/ oh-FAH-dih-lay; born October 9, 1973) is an American former professional football player who was a tight end in the National Football League (NFL) for the Baltimore Ravens, selected 158th overall by the Buffalo Bills in the fifth round of the 1994 NFL draft. He played college football for the Missouri Tigers. He is now the head football coach of Festus High School in Festus, Missouri.
