= Lamar Mills =

American football player (born 1971)

Trevor Wilmot
No. 73
- Position: Defensive tackle

Personal information
- Born: January 26, 1971 (age 55); Detroit, Michigan, U.S.
- Listed height: 6 ft 5 in (1.96 m)
- Listed weight: 270 lb (122 kg)

Career information
- High school: St. Martin de Porres (Detroit)
- College: Indiana
- NFL draft: 1994: undrafted

Career history
- Washington Redskins (1994); Tampa Bay Buccaneers (1996)*; Amsterdam Admirals (1997)
- * Offseason or practice squad member only
- Stats at Pro Football Reference

Franciscus Lamar Mills (born January 26, 1971) is an American former professional football player who was a defensive tackle in the National Football League (NFL) for the Washington Redskins. He played college football for the Indiana Hoosiers.

Mills played high school football at Detroit St. Martin de Porres.
