= Roosevelt Collins =

American football player (born 1968)

No. 52, 56, 92
- Position: Linebacker

Personal information
- Born: January 25, 1968 (age 58); Shreveport, Louisiana, U.S.
- Listed height: 6 ft 4 in (1.93 m)
- Listed weight: 235 lb (107 kg)

Career information
- High school: Booker T. Washington (Shreveport)
- College: TCU (1987–1991)
- NFL draft: 1992: 6th round, 155th overall pick

Career history
- Miami Dolphins (1992–1993); Dallas Cowboys (1994)*; Sacramento Gold Miners (1994); San Antonio Texans (1995); Denver Broncos (1996)*; Amsterdam Admirals (1997)
- * Offseason or practice squad member only

Awards and highlights
- First-team All-SWC (1991); Second-team All-SWC (1989)
- Stats at Pro Football Reference

Roosevelt Collins Jr. (born January 25, 1968) is an American former professional football linebacker who played one season with the Miami Dolphins of the National Football League (NFL). He was selected by the Miami Dolphins in the sixth round of the 1992 NFL draft. He played college football at Texas Christian University. Collins was also a member of the Sacramento Gold Miners, San Antonio Texans and Amsterdam Admirals in Europe.

== Early life ==
Roosevelt Collins Jr. was born on January 25, 1968, in Shreveport, Louisiana. He attended Booker T. Washington High School in Shreveport. He earned all-district honors his senior year.

== College career ==
Collins played college football for the TCU Horned Frogs of Texas Christian University. He was redshirted in 1987. He was then a four-year letterman from 1988 to 1991. Collins earned Associated Press second-team All-Southwest Conference (SWC) honors in 1989 and Coaches first-team All-SWC recognition in 1991. He majored in graphics arts in college.

== Professional career ==
Collins was selected by the Miami Dolphins in the sixth round, with the 155th overall pick, of the 1992 NFL draft. He officially signed with the team on July 10. He was released on September 14 and signed to the practice squad on September 16. Collins was promoted to the active roster on October 21 and played in ten games for the Dolphins during the 1992 season. He was released on August 30, 1993, re-signed the next day, and released again on September 15, 1993.

Collins signed with the Dallas Cowboys on April 22, 1994. He was waived in late August 1994.

Collins appeared in four games for the Sacramento Gold Miners of the Canadian Football League (CFL) in 1994.

Collins played in all 18 games for the San Antonio Texans of the CFL in 1995.

He signed with the Denver Broncos on May 3, 1996, but was released on May 29, 1996.

Collins was drafted by the Amsterdam Admirals in the ninth round with the 51st pick in the 1997 World League of American Football Draft and played for them during the 1997 season.
