= Robert Dougherty (gridiron football) =

American gridiron football quarterback (born 1972)

Profile
- Position: Quarterback

Personal information
- Born: December 18, 1972 (age 53); Visalia, California
- Listed height: 5 ft 9 in (1.75 m)
- Listed weight: 170 lb (77 kg)

Career information
- High school: Mt. Whitney High School (Visalia, California)
- College: Boston University

Career history
- 1995: Toronto Argonauts
- 1995: Ottawa Rough Riders
- 1997: Barcelona Dragons

Awards and highlights
- 2× Yankee Conference Offensive Player of the Year (1993, 1994); 2× All-Yankee Conference (1993, 1994)

Career statistics
- Comp-Att: 14–21
- Yards: 116
- TD–INT: 0–0
- Rushing attempts: 9
- Rushing yards: 52

Robert D. Dougherty (born December 18, 1972) is an American former professional gridiron football quarterback who played in the Canadian Football League (CFL) and the World League of American Football (WLAF).

== Early life ==
Dougherty was born in Visalia, California and grew up in Farmersville, California and attended Mt. Whitney High School. He set the state record for completion percentage as a senior.

== College career ==
Dougherty began his collegiate career at the College of the Sequoias, where he also played basketball and baseball. At 5-9, he intended to pursue a baseball career instead of football before he suffered a back injury. He was named All-Central Valley Conference in both seasons and set school records with 4,988 passing yards and 46 touchdown passes. After his sophomore year Dougherty transferred to Boston University.

In his first season at Boston University, he was named the Yankee Conference Offensive Player of the Year after completing 212-of-386 passes for 2,875 yards and 18 touchdowns while also rushing for 11 touchdowns as the Terriers went undefeated in the regular season. As a senior Dougherty repeated as the conference Offensive Player of the Year after he completed 262-of 440 passes for 3,596 yards and 24 touchdowns as BU went 9-3 and earned an at-large bid to the 1994 NCAA Division I-AA Playoff.

== Professional career ==
Dougherty was signed by the Toronto Argonauts of the Canadian Football League (CFL) on March 17, 1995. He made the team coming out of training camp as the fourth-string quarterback. He was released by the Argonauts during the season and was picked up by the Ottawa Rough Riders. Dougherty was cut the next year during training camp.

Dougherty joined the Barcelona Dragons of the World League of American Football in 1997, where he was a backup on the team's World Bowl '97 championship squad.
