= Ron Lewis (offensive lineman) =

American football player (born 1972)

No. 71
- Position: Guard

Personal information
- Born: November 17, 1972 (age 53); Los Angeles, California, U.S.
- Listed height: 6 ft 3 in (1.91 m)
- Listed weight: 299 lb (136 kg)

Career information
- High school: Susan Miller Dorsey (Los Angeles)
- College: Washington State
- NFL draft: 1995: undrafted

Career history
- Washington Redskins (1995); Amsterdam Admirals (1997–1998); San Jose SaberCats (1999); Los Angeles Avengers (2000); Los Angeles Xtreme (2001)
- Stats at Pro Football Reference

Ronald Mack Lewis, II (born November 17, 1972) is an American former professional football player who was an offensive lineman in the National Football League (NFL) for the Washington Redskins. He played college football at West Los Angeles College and Washington State University.
