= Pete Shufelt =

American football player (born 1969)

No. 58
- Position: Linebacker

Personal information
- Born: October 28, 1969 (age 57); Chicago, Illinois, U.S.
- Listed height: 6 ft 3 in (1.91 m)
- Listed weight: 241 lb (109 kg)

Career information
- High school: Canyon del Oro (Oro Valley, Arizona)
- College: UTEP (1989–1992)
- NFL draft: 1993: undrafted

Career history
- New Orleans Saints (1993)*; San Francisco 49ers (1993)*; Kansas City Chiefs (1993)*; New York Giants (1994); Denver Broncos (1996)*; Rhein Fire (1997)
- * Offseason or practice squad member only

Career NFL statistics
- Games played: 5
- Stats at Pro Football Reference

Peter Julian Shufelt (born October 28, 1969) is an American former professional football player who was a linebacker for the New York Giants of the National Football League (NFL). He played college football for the UTEP Miners.
