= George Coghill (American football) =

American football player (born 1970)

No. 48
- Position: Safety

Personal information
- Born: March 30, 1970 (age 56); Fredericksburg, Virginia, U.S.

Career information
- College: Wake Forest
- NFL draft: 1993: undrafted

Career history
- New Orleans Saints (1993); Scottish Claymores (1995–1997); Denver Broncos (1997–2001)

Awards and highlights
- 2× Super Bowl champion (XXXII, XXXIII); World Bowl champion (1996); Scottish Claymores Hall of Fame; Third-team All-American (1992); 2× First-team All-ACC (1991, 1992)

Career NFL statistics
- Tackles: 34
- Interceptions: 3
- Stats at Pro Football Reference

George Coghill (born March 3, 1970) is an American former professional football player who was a safety for the Denver Broncos of the National Football League (NFL) and the Scottish Claymores (of the World League). He played college football at Wake Forest and high school football at James Monroe High School in Fredericksburg, Virginia, where he lettered in football, basketball, baseball and track. He is currently the Head Football Coach of James Monroe High School.

== College career ==
Coghill played college football at Wake Forest from 1989 to 1992. He was All-ACC two years in a row and a third-team All-American in 1992. A member of the 1992 Independence Bowl champions, Coghill graduated with a degree in sociology in 1993.

== Professional career ==
=== Scottish Claymores ===
Undrafted in 1993, Coghill signed with the New Orleans Saints as a free agent, but tore a knee ligament in an exhibition game in Tokyo. Following recovering from his injury, Coghill was allocated to the Scottish Claymores of the World Football League, where he became one of the short-lived franchise’s best players. Coghill became the Claymores’ all-time leading tackler and all-time interception leader, with 123 and 6 respectively, and is a member of Scottish Claymores Hall of Fame.

=== Denver Broncos ===
Coghill signed with the Denver Broncos in 1997, and won a ring as a member of the Super Bowl XXXII winners, although he was a member of the team’s practice squad and did not play in any regular season games. The following year, Coghill played nine regular season games as well as in Super Bowl XXXIII, during which he made a tackle on the opening kickoff and forced a key fumble late in the game, en route to winning a second championship ring.

== Personal ==
Coghill is married and has three children: two boys and a girl; his son George Coghill III accepted an offer to play football at Virginia Tech as a preferred walk-on after playing all four years of high school football at Mountain View High School.

As of 2020 Coghill is the head football coach and is a teacher at his alma mater James Monroe High School in Fredericksburg, Virginia.
