= World Bowl '96 =

Championship of the World League of American Football

Frankfurt Galaxy	Scottish Claymores
27	32
	1	2	3	4	Total
FRA	7	7	6	7	27
SCO	7	12	9	4	32
- Date: Sunday, June 23, 1996
- Stadium: Murrayfield Stadium; Edinburgh, Scotland
- MVP: Yo Murphy, Wide receiver
- Referee: Walt Coleman
- Attendance: 38,982

TV in the United States
- Network: Fox
- Announcers: Kevin Harlan, Matt Millen and Bill Maas

World Bowl '96 (also referred to as World Bowl IV) was the fourth championship game of the World League of American Football (WLAF). It took place at Murrayfield Stadium in Edinburgh, Scotland on Sunday, June 23, 1996. The 7–3 Scottish Claymores defeated the 7–3 Frankfurt Galaxy (the defending champions) 32–27 and, led by head coach Jim Criner, completed the league's first ever worst to first turnaround. Claymores wide receiver Yo Murphy was voted MVP for his 163 receiving yards and three touchdowns. 38,982 fans were in attendance that day, the highest in Claymores history and the largest crowd ever assembled for an American football game in Scotland.

== Background ==
The Claymores won the regular season series against the Galaxy, 20–0 in Frankfurt and 20–17 in Edinburgh.

== Game summary ==
The game got off to a fast start as Claymore safety George Coghill, on the opening kickoff, stripped the ball from Mario Bailey's arms. After the ball came out, running back Markus Thomas returned the ball 25 yards for a touchdown, allowing former Scotland rugby union player Gavin Hastings to kick the successful point after touchdown. However, the Galaxy would respond to the Claymores challenge, by having an 11-play, 80-yard drive that ended with Jay Kearney running 16 yards on a reverse play for a touchdown. In the second quarter, Galaxy quarterback Steve Pelluer would develop a 6-play, 30-yard drive that concluded with a two-yard touchdown pass to Mario Bailey. For the first time in the game, the Galaxy led the Claymores, but Scotland refused to enter halftime trailing. Claymore quarterback Jim Ballard would lead two successful drives, late in the half. First, a two-play, 39-yard would set up a six-yard pass to eventual MVP Yo Murphy. The point after touchdown failed. Then, a three-play, 15-yard drive would set the stage for a 16-yard pass to Murphy, but the two-point try failed, due to the Galaxy's pass rush. Still, the Claymores regained their lead, being ahead 19–14 at halftime. In the third quarter, the Claymores increased their lead by adding Paul McCallum's 46-yard field goal to their score. However, the Galaxy would respond with a four-play, 74-yard drive that ended with a 32-yard pass to Mario Bailey, but failed on the two-point conversion. The Claymores would respond with a 71-yard touchdown pass from Ballard to Murphy. The point after touchdown failed. In the fourth quarter, the Claymores would get four points on a 50-yard field goal by McCallum. With the Galaxy down 32–20, they needed points and they needed them fast. They would manage a seven-play, 63-yard drive that ended with a five-yard pass from Steve Pelluer to Mike Bellamy. After the Galaxy managed to get the ball back, they had less than a minute to get a touchdown and defend their title. Some quick passes helped Frankfurt get past midfield, but when the Galaxy reached a fourth and short situation, the mood throughout Murrayfield Stadium was tension. When the ball was snapped, the hand-off to Ingo Seibert was fumbled. Steve Pelluer managed to recover the ball and pick up the first down, but then, a flag was thrown. The referees stated that the fourth down rule was in effect. Since another player recovered the ball, the play was blown dead. It was that play and that rule that preserved the Claymores lead, giving them their 1996 World Bowl title.

Scoring summary

Quarter	Time	Drive			Team	Scoring information	Score	
Quarter	Time	Plays	Yards	TOP	Team	Scoring information	Frankfurt	Scotland
1	14:49	0	0		Scotland	Fumble recovery returned 25 yards for touchdown by Markus Thomas, Gavin Hastings kick good	0	7
1	8:33	11	80		Frankfurt	Jay Kearney 16-yard touchdown run, Ralf Kleinmann kick good	7	7
2	10:21	6	30		Frankfurt	Mario Bailey 2-yard touchdown reception from Steve Pelluer, Ralf Kleinmann kick good	14	7
2	0:58	2	39		Scotland	Yo Murphy 6-yard touchdown reception from Jim Ballard, kick no good	14	13
2	0:08	3	15		Scotland	Yo Murphy 16-yard touchdown reception from Jim Ballard, 2-point failed	14	19
3	8:14	7	34		Scotland	46-yard field goal by Paul McCallum	14	22
3	5:58	4	74		Frankfurt	Mario Bailey 32-yard touchdown reception from Steve Pelluer, 2-point failed	20	22
3	10:18	1	71		Scotland	Yo Murphy 71-yard touchdown reception from Jim Ballard, kick no good	20	28
4	9:54	4	7		Scotland	50-yard field goal by Paul McCallum	20	32
4	2:50	7	63		Frankfurt	Mike Bellamy 5-yard touchdown reception from Steve Pelluer, Ralf Kleinmann kick good	27	32
"TOP" = time of possession. For other American football terms, see Glossary of American football.							27	32
