= Tommy Johnson (American football) =

American football player (born 1971)

No. 21, 25
- Position: Cornerback

Personal information
- Born: December 5, 1971 (age 54); Rome, Georgia, U.S.
- Listed height: 5 ft 10 in (1.78 m)
- Listed weight: 183 lb (83 kg)

Career information
- High school: Niceville (Niceville, Florida)
- College: Alabama (1991–1994)
- NFL draft: 1995: undrafted

Career history
- Jacksonville Jaguars (1995–1996); Amsterdam Admirals (1997); Albany Firebirds (1998–1999); Carolina Cobras (2000)

Awards and highlights
- ArenaBowl champion (1999); National champion (1992); First-team All-SEC (1994)

Career NFL statistics
- Games played: 1
- Stats at Pro Football Reference
- Stats at ArenaFan.com

Tommy Postell Johnson (born December 5, 1971) is an American former professional football cornerback who played in the National Football League (NFL) for the Jacksonville Jaguars. He played college football for the Alabama Crimson Tide. Johnson had a stint in the World League of American Football (WLAF) with the Amsterdam Admirals and in the Arena Football League (AFL) with the Albany Firebirds and Carolina Cobras.

== Early life ==
Johnson was born on December 5, 1971, in Rome, Georgia. He attended Niceville High School in Niceville, Florida.

== College career ==
Johnson played college football for the Alabama Crimson Tide from 1991 to 1994. In 47 games he 12 interceptions, including one returned for a touchdown, 77 punt return yards. In 1992, against the Southern Miss Golden Eagles, Johnson caught a pass from Bryne Diehl on a fake punt for a 73-yard touchdown. He earned first-team All-SEC honors in 1994.

== Professional career ==
=== Jacksonville Jaguars ===
After going undrafted in the 1995 NFL draft, Johnson signed with the Jacksonville Jaguars as an undrafted free agent. On August 19, he was waived. On August 28, Johnson was signed to the practice squad. On November 17, he was elevated to the active roster. Against the Tampa Bay Buccaneers, Johnson played on kick and punt coverage. He spent the remainder of the season on the active roster but did not play in any more games. On August 19, 1996, Johnson was released by the Jaguars.

=== Amsterdam Admirals ===
Johnson was selected with the 26th overall pick in 1997 WLAF free agent draft by the Frankfurt Galaxy. However, he would end up playing for the Amsterdam Admirals, recording eight tackles and three pass break ups.

=== Albany Firebirds ===
On January 31, 1997, Johnson was signed by the Albany Firebirds of the Arena Football League (AFL). On April 13, 1998, he was activated by the team. As a defensive specialist, Johnson had 74 tackles, three interceptions, ten pass break ups, one forced fumble and two touchdowns. The following year, he made 18 tackles and two pass deflections as the team won ArenaBowl XIII.

=== Carolina Cobras ===
On December 16, 1999, Johnson was signed by the newly formed, Carolina Cobras. In his lone year for the Cobras, he had 20 tackles, three pass break ups, one forced fumble and two receptions for 18 yards and a touchdown. After the season ended Johnson went unsigned by the team.

== Personal life ==
After Johnson retired from professional football, he became a teacher and assistant football coach at Crestview High School in Florida. He is married with two children.
