= World Bowl '97 =

Championship of the World League of American Football

Rhein Fire	Barcelona Dragons
24	38
	1	2	3	4	Total
RHE	3	14	0	7	24
BAR	14	14	7	3	38
- Date: Sunday, June 22, 1997
- Stadium: Estadi Olímpic de Montjuïc; Barcelona, Spain
- MVP: Jon Kitna, Quarterback
- Referee: Phil Luckett
- Attendance: 31,100

TV in the United States
- Network: Fox
- Announcers: Kevin Harlan, Matt Millen and Bill Maas

World Bowl '97 (also referred to as World Bowl V) was the final game of the 1997 WLAF season in American football. It was the fifth championship game of the World League of American Football (WLAF), and the third since the WLAF adopted a six-team European format.

The game was held at Estadi Olimpic de Montjuic in Barcelona, Spain on Sunday, June 22, 1997. The game was played between the 7–3 Rhein Fire and the 5–5 Barcelona Dragons. 31,100 fans were in attendance as the Dragons won their first and only World Bowl title in franchise history by beating the Fire 38–24. Dragons quarterback Jon Kitna was given MVP honors after completing 23 of 31 attempts for 401 yards with two touchdowns and one interception.

== Background ==
The Dragons won the first meeting 27–12 in Düsseldorf, while the Fire won the second meeting 38–23 in Barcelona.

== Game summary ==
The Rhein Fire managed to get the game's early sparks going as they had a nine-play, 46-yard drive that led to a 31-yard field goal by Manfred Burgsmüller. However, the Dragons would put up some real firepower, as Dragons quarterback Jon Kitna led a four-play, 80-yard drive that was capped off with a 13-yard run by running back Terry Wilburn. Then, more than halfway through the first quarter, as Rhein began a drive from deep in their own territory, quarterback T. J. Rubley threw an interception towards Dragons safety Carlos Brooks, who returned the ball 16 yards for a touchdown. In the second quarter, the fireworks managed to start flying. Rubley would lead a seven-play, 39-yard drive and cap it off with a touchdown on a three-yard quarterback sneak. However, Kitna and the Dragons would respond with a four-play, 79-yard drive that concluded with a 66-yard touchdown pass to wide receiver Marco Martos. Then, a little later in the quarter, the Dragons would further increase their lead with a five-play, 80-yard drive that ended with a 40-yard pass to wide receiver Alfonzo Browning. However, the Rhein Fire refused to trail 28–10 at halftime. Near the end of the half, Rubley would lead a nine-play, 56-yard drive that concluded with him running the ball in for a touchdown on a one-yard quarterback sneak. In the third quarter, both sides had their defenses stiffen throughout most of the quarter. However, the Dragons would eventually get an eight-play, 90-yard drive working for them, as Terry Wilburn capped off the drive with a four-yard touchdown run. Trailing 35–17 heading into the fourth quarter, the Rhein Fire had to get some points quick and fast. Unfortunately for them, the only score that they could get in the final quarter was a 22-yard pass from Rubley to wide receiver Sean Foster. The Dragons then capped off their World Bowl title with a 34-yard field goal by Spanish kicker Jesús Angoy.

Scoring summary

Quarter	Time	Drive			Team	Scoring information	Score	
Quarter	Time	Plays	Yards	TOP	Team	Scoring information	Rhein	Barcelona
1	10:03	9	46		Rhein	31-yard field goal by Manfred Burgsmüller	3	0
1	8:26	4	80		Barcelona	Terry Wilburn 13-yard touchdown run, Jesús Angoy kick good	3	7
1	3:55	0	0		Barcelona	Interception returned 16 yards for touchdown by Carlos Brooks, Jesús Angoy kick good	3	14
2	14:02	7	39		Rhein	T. J. Rubley 3-yard touchdown run, Manfred Burgsmüller kick good	10	14
2	12:01	4	79		Barcelona	Marco Martos 66-yard touchdown reception from Jon Kitna, Jesús Angoy kick good	10	21
2	5:59	5	80		Barcelona	Alfonzo Browning 40-yard touchdown reception from Jon Kitna, Jesús Angoy kick good	10	28
2	1:47	9	56		Rhein	T. J. Rubley 1-yard touchdown run, Manfred Burgsmüller kick good	17	28
3	2:06	8	90		Barcelona	Terry Wilburn 4-yard touchdown run, Jesús Angoy kick good	17	35
4	13:31	8	71		Rhein	Sean Foster 22-yard touchdown reception from T. J. Rubley, Manfred Burgsmüller kick good	24	35
4	8:49	7	59		Barcelona	34-yard field goal by Jesús Angoy	24	38
"TOP" = time of possession. For other American football terms, see Glossary of American football.							24	38
