= Phil Luckett =

American football official

Phil Luckett is a retired official in the National Football League (NFL), having served from 1991 to 2005, and again in 2007. His officiating uniform number was 59. He entered the NFL as a field judge in 1991 and officiated Super Bowl XXXI, his last game at that position before he became a referee in 1997 after Red Cashion and Howard Roe announced their retirements. He also refereed in the WLAF/NFL Europe, including being assigned World Bowl '97. He returned to the NFL back judge position in 2001, three years after the NFL switched the titles of back judge and field judge. He took a leave of absence from the NFL for the 2006 season. In 2007, he returned to officiating as the back judge on Bill Carollo's crew and retired at the end of the season. After retiring, he was employed by the league as an officiating supervisor.

== Officiating controversies ==
During an overtime coin toss during a Thanksgiving Day game in 1998 between the Pittsburgh Steelers and the Detroit Lions, the coin landed on tails and Luckett awarded the toss to the Lions. Steelers captain Jerome Bettis said he had called "tails", but Luckett insisted that Bettis had called "heads-tails". According to NFL rules, a team's first call is the one the referee will use, and Luckett noted in his game report to the NFL that Bettis was attempting to deceive. The Lions scored a field goal on their first possession of the overtime to win the game. The game tape was later enhanced, and Bettis is clearly heard saying "hea-tails." A sideline microphone enhancement also clearly had Bettis telling coach Bill Cowher that (Bettis) had said "hea-tails."

Following this incident, the coin toss rules were changed. Now, instead of calling the toss while the coin is in the air, the team captain chooses heads or tails before the coin is flipped and the referee confirms the selection before he flips the coin.

The following week Luckett and his crew were assigned to Giants Stadium for the game between the New York Jets and the Seattle Seahawks, a game with playoff implications for both teams. Late in the game, with his team trailing, Jets quarterback Vinny Testaverde attempted a quarterback sneak near the Seahawks' goal line and Luckett's head linesman Earnie Frantz signaled that he had scored the go-ahead touchdown. Various television replays showed Testaverde was clearly down by contact on the play and never crossed the goal line. Luckett, however, did not reverse the call and the play stood as the winning score in New York's 32–31 victory. At the time, the NFL did not use instant replay to review officials' decisions; the call would be cited as a major reason why the NFL reinstituted instant replay (albeit with a different system from the original) after a seven-season absence the following season.

He was also the referee when the Music City Miracle play occurred during the 1999 Playoffs between the Buffalo Bills and the Tennessee Titans. Despite protests, Luckett ruled that a legal lateral pass had been thrown for the game-winning touchdown, a controversial call that was much disputed, even years later.

Luckett was the league supervisor assigned to the 2012 Green Bay Packers–Seattle Seahawks game that contributed to the end of the 2012 NFL referee lockout.
