= 1997 WLAF season =

European-American football season

The 1997 World League of American Football season was the fifth campaign of the WLAF professional American football league, and the third under its six-team Europe-only format. World Bowl '97 was won by the Barcelona Dragons, whose quarterback was Jon Kitna, then on the roster of the Seattle Seahawks in the NFL.

== Season ==
The Amsterdam Admirals moved their home games to the new Amsterdam ArenA.

During the regular season the 7–3 Rhein Fire finished ahead of the 5–5 Barcelona Dragons in the standings. Barcelona, however, had had a 4–1 start to qualify for the World Bowl as midseason leaders, also gaining the right to host the World Bowl. In the second half of the season, with little to play for, Barcelona went 1–4. This was instrumental in a rule change for the following season, namely that the end-of-season league leader and runner-up would contest the World Bowl, not the midseason leader.

In week 1 Frankfurt travelled to London and lost 14–7, suffering what Frankfurt's coach Ernie Stautner called "the worst game I've seen offensively in all the years I've been in football". In week 4 the Dragons beat London, who suffered the "most spectacular collapse in World League history" according to Nick Halling, in giving away a 23-point lead.

The Fire, with a 10–7 win in London on June 15, 1997, secured first place in the league as the only team with a winning record.

World League of American Football
| Team | W | L | T | PCT | PF | PA | Home | Road | STK |
|---|---|---|---|---|---|---|---|---|---|
| Rhein Fire | 7 | 3 | 0 | .700 | 206 | 146 | 3–2 | 4–1 | W3 |
| Barcelona Dragons | 5 | 5 | 0 | .500 | 236 | 209 | 2–3 | 3–2 | W1 |
| Scottish Claymores | 5 | 5 | 0 | .500 | 134 | 154 | 2–3 | 3–2 | L2 |
| Amsterdam Admirals | 5 | 5 | 0 | .500 | 156 | 160 | 4–1 | 1–4 | W1 |
| Frankfurt Galaxy | 4 | 6 | 0 | .400 | 147 | 142 | 3–2 | 1–4 | L1 |
| London Monarchs | 4 | 6 | 0 | .400 | 116 | 184 | 2–3 | 2–3 | L1 |

== World Bowl '97 ==
Barcelona beat Rhein Fire 38–24 at the Estadi Olímpic de Montjuïc in Barcelona, Spain on Sunday, June 22, 1997. World Bowl '97 was the fifth championship game of the World League of American Football. 31,100 fans were in attendance as the Dragons won their first and only World Bowl title in franchise history. Jon Kitna was given MVP honors after completing 23 of 31 attempts for 401 yards with two touchdowns and one interception.

== League renaming ==
For 1998 the World League of American Football was rebranded "NFL Europe".
