= Scottish Claymores =

American football team in Scotland

Logo

General information
- Founded: 1995
- Folded: 2004
- Stadium: Murrayfield Stadium (1995–2000, 2002); Hampden Park (1998–2004)
- Headquartered: Edinburgh, Scotland (1995–2000, 2002); Glasgow, Scotland (1998–2004)
- Colors: Navy, Royal Blue, Silver, White

League / conference affiliations
- World League of American Football (NFL Europe)

Championships
- World Bowls: 1: World Bowl '96 (1996)

The Scottish Claymores were an American football team based in Scotland. The franchise played in the World League of American Football (later renamed NFL Europe) between 1995 and 2004, initially playing all home games at Murrayfield Stadium, Edinburgh and latterly sharing home games with Hampden Park, Glasgow. In ten seasons of NFL Europe play, the Claymores reached the World Bowl on two occasions, with victory in World Bowl '96 but defeat in World Bowl 2000. Their name derives from that of the Claymore, a double-edged sword historically used in Scottish clan warfare. One notable player was Gavin Hastings, a Scottish rugby international who was used as a place kicker in 1996.

The Claymores experienced several notable swings in fortune during their ten years. Their World Bowl-winning season of 1996 was the league's first worst-to-first turnaround: having finished 1995 with a 2–8 record and no wins at home, the 1996 Claymores went 7–3 in the regular season and won all their home games. Equally remarkable was the contrast between their first home games of the 2003 and 2004 seasons. In week 1 of the 2003 season, the Claymores defeated the Berlin Thunder 62–31 – the highest scoring game in NFL Europe history – but in 2004 their home opener was a 3–0 defeat at the hands of the Amsterdam Admirals, tying the record for the league's lowest-scoring game.

== History ==
In 1992, the World League of American Football was put on hold by the NFL, with the intention of restructuring the league to become completely European-based. As a result, the three existing European teams in Barcelona, London and Frankfurt survived to be joined by three new teams, and in 1994 it was announced that Edinburgh had been awarded one of them (along with Amsterdam and Düsseldorf). The Claymores were assigned former Arena Football League coach Lary Kuharich to be their first head coach, but just days before their first game against Rhein, Kuharich was dismissed and replaced by former Boise State head coach Jim Criner.

=== 1995 season ===
The Claymores' first roster included five players sent to the club from the NFL, including quarterbacks Matt Blundin from the Kansas City Chiefs and Lee Williamson from the Houston Oilers; as with all World League teams, it included seven "national" players, including wide-receiver Scott Couper. The Claymores played their first-ever game in Edinburgh on 9 April 1995, a 19–17 loss to the Rhein Fire (Coincidentally, the Claymores' three worst seasons (1995, 1998 and 2004: all 2–8) would all begin in the same way: with the Claymores falling to week 1 defeat on a missed field goal. In the other 7 seasons, the Claymores started 1–0). The team's first win came two weeks later, 20–14 over the Galaxy in Frankfurt. Six straight defeats followed however, including a 31–0 shutout to the Amsterdam Admirals and an overtime loss to the Fire, before winning the final game of the regular season 22–9 against British rivals the London Monarchs.

The Claymores finished bottom of the six-team division with its 2–8 record. Criner used four quarterbacks over the course of the season; Blundin, Williamson, Terry Karg and a brief outing for Jim Ballard. The team's offensive leader was Siran Stacy, who rushed for 785 yards and five touchdowns, and caught receptions totalling 324 yards. Allan DeGraffenreid also made 624 receiving yards and four touchdowns. Attendances were around the 10,000 mark to begin, but slumped as low as 6,800 for the final home game of the season.

=== 1996 season ===
The Claymores made an aggressive marketing push for the 1996 campaign under new general manager Mike Keller, which even included bringing in former Scotland Rugby union captain Gavin Hastings as a placekicker. Criner's 1996 roster featured an increased number of signed NFL players. Quarterback Steve Matthews (like Blundin, contracted to the Chiefs) opened the season, but when returnee Jim Ballard showed greater consistency coming off the bench to replace an injured Matthews in week seven, Ballard would get the nod for the remainder of the season. Starting 1996 where they had left off 1995, the Claymores opened with an overtime victory over the London Monarchs, followed up with home wins against the Barcelona Dragons (23–13) and the Amsterdam Admirals (21–14). Despite defeat away to Rhein the 3–1 start propelled the Claymores into a mid-season showdown with the unbeaten Frankfurt Galaxy on 11 May, where under WLAF rules the winner would advance to the World Bowl as hosts. A 20–0 win meant the championship game was coming to Edinburgh. The Claymores ran out the regular season with a 7–3 record to top the division. On 23 June, the Claymores again faced the Galaxy in World Bowl 96 at Murrayfield. The hosts rode three touchdown passes from Ballard to game MVP Yo Murphy and held off a late rally to win 32–27, thus completing the WLAF's first worst-to-first turnaround in front of a crowd of 38,982.

Siran Stacy was again influential in offense, with a nearly identical haul to his previous season's; 780 rushing yards and 317 receiving yards, for nine touchdowns. Sean LaChapelle was a thousand-yard receiver but forced out of the World Bowl with a groin injury, while Yo Murphy managed five touchdowns on the season. On defense, safety George Coghill picked five interceptions, one returned for a touchdown. Coghill also forced a Galaxy fumble from the opening kickoff in the World Bowl, with all-round special teams player Markus Thomas returning the spilled ball for a touchdown; he also led the team in tackles, and caught one pass on offense. Safety James Fuller shared Coghill's total of five interceptions, while defensive tackle Jerold Jeffcoat – brother of the Dallas Cowboys' Jim – had five sacks on the season.

=== 1997 season ===
Scotland's 1997 season opened with a 16–3 victory in Amsterdam, followed up by back-to-back defeats and closing out the first half of the season 3–2. Two more straight wins improved World Bowl prospects, but a narrow 10–9 defeat to the Monarchs in the penultimate week left the Claymores needing a victory in Barcelona against the Dragons – however, they were trounced 46–18 and finished the season 5–5, surrendering the second World Bowl spot to Barcelona in the process.

Quarterback time was shared between the San Francisco 49ers' Dave Barr and the Miami Dolphins' Spence Fischer (who doubled as occasional punter). However, they managed just four touchdown passes combined while throwing 10 interceptions and sharing 31 sacks. Siran Stacy completed another 785-yard rushing season with four touchdowns; Yo Murphy was the leading receiver with 559 yards and two touchdowns; only he, Scott Couper and Allan DeGraffenreid completed touchdown passes on the season. George Coghill again led the defense in tackles.

=== 1998 season ===
A much-changed 1998 roster saw World Bowl-winning quarterback Jim Ballard back in Scotland after missing 1997; however, two of the team's offensive leaders from the previous year, Siran Stacy, and Yo Murphy, did not return. Jim Criner led his team into the opening game in Barcelona, where kicker Gary Parker missed what would have been a game-winning field goal from 31 yards, the Claymores losing out 19-18. Three more defeats followed in Amsterdam (26-3), at home to the Fire (20-10) and at the now-England Monarchs (14-10), with the first win of the season only coming in Week 5, 30-10 over the Dragons. Their 1-4 start made World Bowl qualification very unlikely; their week 6 defeat to the Fire (perfect to this point in the season) sealed their fate. The side slumped to bottom of the division, finishing 2-8.

The new-lock backs and receivers failed to match previous seasons' yardage figures; leading rusher Carey Bender made 441 yards, while Chris Miller topped the receiving statistics with 34 receptions for 527 yards. In total the Claymores managed just twelve offensive touchdowns in ten games, punting the ball 53 times.

Off the field, it was a troubled season for Scotland in the now rebranded NFL Europe League, where leaked information that a third German team was to be founded to add to the already successful Fire and Galaxy sparked concerns the Claymores may be closed down: eventually however, it would be the England Monarchs who would be replaced by the Berlin Thunder, ending the Battle of Britain rivalry series tied at 4-4. It was also during the 1998 season the Claymores played at Hampden Park in Glasgow for the first time, a week 8 loss to the Galaxy (originally, the Glasgow game was scheduled to be the week 10 visit of the Amsterdam Admirals at Firhill Stadium).

Four home games played in Edinburgh and one in Glasgow.

=== 1999 season ===
For 1999, Scotland were allocated Carolina Panthers quarterback Dameyune Craig, who opened the season with a narrow 21-20 win over the Rhein Fire, rushing for the winning touchdown himself late in the fourth quarter. The Claymores then hammered the league's newest team, the Berlin Thunder, 48-14, Shon Bell catching two touchdown passes from tight-end. An overtime loss to Frankfurt followed; but by the time Scotland had returned to Frankfurt in Week 6, winning with a reverse of the 42-35 scoreline that the Galaxy had earned in Week 3, Scotland were 4-2 and in contention to reach World Bowl VII. However, the team then collapsed to four consecutive defeats, two of them back-to-back against Amsterdam, and finished ahead of only Berlin in the final standings.

The side's leading rusher in 1999 was Jesse Haynes, with quarterback Craig contributing 50 rushing attempts and 3 touchdowns. Haynes totalled eleven touchdowns, seven rushing and four receiving. Yo Murphy returned to the Claymores with four touchdown catches (and an 89-yard kickoff return for a touchdown) but the leading wide receiver was Donald Sellers, who totalled 931 receiving yards for seven touchdowns.

Although the Claymores finished the 1999 season with a losing record, there would still be a historical moment: Craig would throw for 611 yards in the road victory in Frankfurt, a record passing total in professional American football. The helmet and number 2 jersey Craig wore that night are on display in the Pro Football Hall of Fame in Canton, Ohio.

Three home games played in Edinburgh and two in Glasgow.

=== 2000 season ===
The 2000 Claymores were fronted primarily by Kevin Daft; a 32-year-old Siran Stacy was on the roster for 2000 but had very little playing time. Like previous seasons, the Claymores opened positively with opening wins against Amsterdam and in Frankfurt. A 42-3 demolition of the Berlin Thunder sent the Claymores to 3-1, but with World Bowl qualification in the balance, the Claymores strung together three big late-season wins; with defeat over the Fire at Hampden on 10 June secured a World Bowl finale between those teams. Scotland led 7-3 when Aaron Stecker went over with a 36-yard first-quarter rush, exchanging field-goals for a 10-6 halftime lead. Pepe Pearson scored the second half's only touchdown for the Fire, leaving Rob Hart to attempt a game-tying field goal with eight seconds left; it sailed left, and Scotland lost World Bowl VIII in what turned out to be Criner's last game as head coach as he would depart for the XFL

2000 was much more successful offensively for Scotland; Aaron Stecker, an allocation from the Tampa Bay Buccaneers, was the first Scotland running back to near Stacy's early-season figures with 774 rushing yards, 276 receiving yards and 11 total touchdowns. Sellers again led Scotland in receiving yards (353, 5 touchdowns). Scott Couper caught three touchdown passes; in total, the Claymores outscored their opponents by 37 touchdowns to 18. Three Claymores shared a season-leading total of seven sacks; Antonio Dingle, Michael Mason and Jabbar Threats.

Three home games played in Edinburgh and two in Glasgow.

=== 2001 season ===
For 2001 – the first season under Criner's replacement, Gene Dahlquist and the first home campaign that would be played entirely in Glasgow – the new Scotland quarterback was the Dallas Cowboys' Clint Stoerner; however offensive leaders of 2000 like Stecker failed to return. Close games were the nature of Scotland's early season, trading wins for losses over the opening six games, never by a margin of more than ten points. With the Claymores at 3-3 as the season entered its crucial period in June, the 2001 Claymores lost three games on the bounce as their predecessors had won them. A consolation victory against the Fire completed another losing season, the third in five years, 4-and-6.

Stoerner completed around 55% of passes on the season and threw 10 touchdowns, compared to Daft's previous-season tally of 24. His primary target was tight-end James Whalen, a fellow Cowboys recruit, while Dante Hall provided five touchdown catches; the only other Claymores to catch a touchdown pass were Scott Couper and Gerald Williams. Anothony Gray led the Claymores in rushing at 445 yards and half of the franchise's four rushing touchdowns on the year.

=== 2002 season ===
Another year, another quarterback for Scotland; their fifth starter in five years was the Detroit Lions' Scott Driesbach. His season opened well with a 45-17 demolition of Barcelona; Driesbach's first play in a Claymores uniform was a touchdown pass to Scott McCready. The win was the only victory of Scotland's first four games, as they slumped to defeats of less than a touchdown to Rhein and Frankfurt (twice). Scotland did not contest a game decided by less than ten points throughout the season's remainder; three straight wins took them back to a promising 4-3, but back-to-back defeats against the Berlin Thunder ended World Bowl hopes. Victory in Barcelona – for the first time ever – ended a .500 season.

Driesbach completed just 95 passes all season, and was replaced with James Brown; totalling just 1518 offensive yards were top receivers McCready and Dondre Gilliam. Scotland's rushing game was a one-man show, with #29 Herbert Goodman making 873 yards and every one of Scotland's six rushing touchdowns. To sixteen offensive touchdowns were added three interception returns, including a 69-yarder by James Rooths. Rob Hart was a perfect 10-10 in field goals, sharing kicking time with Scottish-born kicker Lawrence Tynes.

Four home games played in Glasgow and one in Edinburgh.

=== 2003 season ===
For 2003, Craig Nall was recruited from the Green Bay Packers to play at quarterback; Scott McCready was one of few players to return for a second Claymores season. An NFL Europe scoring record came with Scotland's opening 62-31 defeat of the World Bowl champion Thunder. There were four rushing touchdowns for Ken Simonton and a TD catch on return from "retirement" for Scott Couper. Over the next five games, Scotland added just one victory however, and were all but out of World Bowl contention by mid-May Shutting out the Rhein Fire 33-0 rekindled hopes, and strong victories over Barcelona and Amsterdam twice brought around a 6-4 conclusion, matching the season's best; however, they were denied a spot in World Bowl XI on the tie-breaker of net results with the Frankfurt Galaxy and Rhein Fire, which was increasingly unfortunate as the World Bowl was to be staged at Hampden Park.

Ken Simonton resprised Herbert Goodman's rushing role, totalling just two yards (and two touchdowns) less than Goodman's tally. Maurice Hicks received 74 handoffs as well, scoring four rushing touchdowns, including a 93-yarder. Through the air, Nall's best receivers were Edell Shepherd (518 yards, 4 touchdowns) and John Minardi (470 yards, 5 touchdowns). Ten Claymores caught touchdown passes on the season. TJ Bingham took seven sacks on defense.

Dahlquist was fired after the 2003 season, and after the Barcelona Dragons became the second NFL Europe team to be relocated to Germany (becoming the Cologne Centurions) their head coach Jack Bicknell stepped into the vacancy. In his single season in charge, the Claymores finished 2-8.

=== 2004 season ===
2004 opened very poorly for Scotland, with four consecutive losses to open up the season. Only a 13–12 win over the Rhein Fire prevented a first-half shut-out. The same 1–4 record was posted for the second half of the season, completing a 2–8 season for the third time (equal worst in the team's history) and failure to qualify for World Bowl XII.

=== Closure ===
On 21 October 2004, NFL Europe announced that the Scottish Claymores would be discontinued in favour of a franchise in a more competitive German market. While Scotland's attendance average over their 10-season history of 11,306 was comparable to some Scottish Premier League clubs, teams in Germany were able to consistently bring in more support. Scotland were ultimately replaced by the Hamburg Sea Devils on 24 November for the 2005 NFL Europe season. Despite closing, the Scottish Claymores identity is being maintained to induct players to their Hall of Fame, and as a means for promoting amateur American football in Scotland. The team played a total of 26 regular season home games in Edinburgh and 24 regular season home games in Glasgow. One World Bowl was played in Edinburgh and one in Glasgow.

== Season-by-season ==
| Season | League | Regular season | | | | | Postseason | | | |
| Season | League | Won | Lost | Ties | Win % | Finish | Won | Lost | Win % | Result |
|---|---|---|---|---|---|---|---|---|---|---|
| 1995 | WLAF | 2 | 8 | 0 | .200 | 6th (League) | – | – | — | — |
| 1996 | WLAF | 7 | 3 | 0 | .700 | 1st (League) | 1 | 0 | 1.000 | World Bowl '96 champions |
| 1997 | WLAF | 5 | 5 | 0 | .500 | 3rd (League) | – | – | — | — |
| 1998 | NFLE | 2 | 8 | 0 | .200 | 6th (League) | – | – | — | — |
| 1999 | NFLE | 4 | 6 | 0 | .400 | 5th (League) | – | – | — | — |
| 2000 | NFLE | 6 | 4 | 0 | .600 | 2nd (League) | 0 | 1 | .000 | Lost to Rhein Fire in World Bowl 2000 |
| 2001 | NFLE | 4 | 6 | 0 | .400 | 4th (League) | – | – | — | — |
| 2002 | NFLE | 5 | 5 | 0 | .500 | 4th (League) | – | – | — | — |
| 2003 | NFLE | 6 | 4 | 0 | .600 | 3rd (League) | – | – | — | — |
| 2004 | NFLE | 2 | 8 | 0 | .200 | 6th (League) | – | – | — | — |
| Total | | 43 | 57 | 0 | .430 | | 1 | 1 | .500 | |

== Head coaches ==
| # | Name | Term | Regular season | | | | | Postseason | | | | Achievements |
| # | Name | Term | GC | Won | Lost | Ties | Win % | GC | Won | Lost | Win % | Achievements |
|---|---|---|---|---|---|---|---|---|---|---|---|---|
| 1 | Jim Criner | 1995–2000 | 60 | 26 | 34 | 0 | .433 | 2 | 1 | 1 | .500 | World Bowl '96 championship World League Coach of the Year (1996) |
| 2 | Gene Dahlquist | 2001–2003 | 30 | 15 | 15 | 0 | .500 | 0 | 0 | 0 | .000 | — |
| 3 | Jack Bicknell | 2004 | 10 | 2 | 8 | 0 | .200 | 0 | 0 | 0 | .000 | — |

== Hall of Fame ==
The Scottish Claymores Hall of Fame inducted new members every year from 1999 to 2006, except 2005.

- 1999: (United States) Siran Stacy, (United States) George Coghill
- 2000: (United States) Sean LaChapelle, (United States) Mark Sander
- 2001: (United States) Jim Ballard, (United States) Purvis Hunt, (United States) Jim Criner (head coach)
- 2002: (United States) Dameyune Craig, (United States) Yo Murphy
- 2003: (Puerto Rico) Marco Rivera, (United States) Aaron Stecker
- 2004: (United States) Joe Andruzzi, (United States) James Fuller, (United States) Dante Hall, (United States) Duane Hawthorne, (Canada) Paul McCallum, (United States) Barry Sims, (United States) Barry Stokes and non-playing staff including the fans in general
- 2006: (Scotland) Scott Couper, (England) Robert Flickinger, (England) Rob Hart, (United States) Craig Nall, (England) Scott McCready, (United States) Chris Ward, (Scotland) Steve Livingstone (general manager)
