= 1995 Amsterdam Admirals season =

World League of American Football team season

- General manager: Darrell Roland
- Head coach: Al Luginbill
- Home stadium: Olympisch Stadion; De Meer Stadion

Results
- Record: 9–1
- Division place: 1st
- Playoffs: Lost World Bowl '95

The 1995 Amsterdam Admirals season was the inaugural season for the franchise in the World League of American Football (WLAF). The team was led by head coach Al Luginbill, and played its home games at Olympisch Stadion and De Meer Stadion in Amsterdam, Netherlands. They finished the regular season in first place with a record of nine wins and one loss. In World Bowl '95, Amsterdam lost to the Frankfurt Galaxy 26–22.

== Offseason ==
=== World League draft ===
1995 Amsterdam Admirals World League draft selections
Draft order			Player name	Position	College
Round	Choice	Overall	Player name	Position	College
1	3	3	Mike Evans	DT	Michigan
2	4	10	Kelly Sims	CB	Cincinnati
3	3	15	Chuck Dukes	RB	Boston College
4	4	22	Ron Carpenter	S	Miami (OH)
5	3	27	Cedric Figaro	LB	Notre Dame
6	4	34	Shawn Harper	T	Indiana
7	3	39	Peter Pale	G	Hawaii
8	4	46	Jon Kirksey	DT	Sacramento State
9	3	51	Anthony McClanahan	LB	Washington State
10	4	58	Trumane Bell	TE	Nebraska
11	3	63	Sanjay Beach	WR	Colorado State
12	4	70	Robert Baxley	G	Iowa
13	3	75	Robert O'Neal	S	Clemson
14	4	82	Garry Howe	NT	Colorado
15	3	87	Keith Franklin	LB	South Carolina
16	4	94	Malcolm Showell	DE	Delaware State
17	3	99	Sean Washington	CB	Rice
18	4	106	Ernie Rogers	T	California
19	3	111	Karmeeleyah McGill	LB	Notre Dame
20	4	118	Curvin Richards	RB	Pittsburgh
21	3	123	Jey Phillips	CB	Arizona
22	4	130	Eddie Small	WR	Mississippi
23	3	135	Bret Kwarta	G	UC Davis
24	4	142	David Hollie	DT	Jackson State
25	3	147	Tim Walton	LB	Ball State
26	4	154	David Jones	TE	Delaware State
27	3	159	Chuck Carswell	DB	Georgia
28	4	166	John Bock	G	Indiana State
29	3	171	A. J. Jenkins	DE	Cal State Fullerton
30	4	178	Brice Adams	FB	Michigan State
31	3	183	Ernie Jones	WR	Indiana
32	4	190	Joey Smith	WR	Louisville
33	3	195	Latish Kinsley	S	Cincinnati
34	4	202	Paul Duckworth	LB	Connecticut
35	3	207	Tommy Jones	S	Fresno State
36	4	214	Melvin Aldridge	S	Murray State
37	3	219	Chris Luneburg	T	West Chester (PA)
38	4	226	Alonzo Barnett	S	North Carolina A&T
39	3	231	Chad Lindsey	WR	Cincinnati
40	4	238	Mario Cristobal	T	Miami (FL)
41	3	243	Craig McEwen	TE	Utah
42	4	250	Blaine Berger	DT	Utah
43	3	255	Dedric Smith	WR	Savannah State
44	4	262	Terry Belden	P/K	Northern Arizona
45	3	267	Brad Lebo	QB	Montana
46	4	274	Fredrick Washington	TE	Mississippi Valley State

=== NFL allocations ===
Player name	Position	College	NFL team
Darren Bennett	P	None	San Diego Chargers
Ralph Dawkins	RB	Louisville	New Orleans Saints
Will Furrer	QB	Virginia Tech	Denver Broncos
Bobby Hamilton	DE	Southern Mississippi	Seattle Seahawks
Jamie Martin	QB	Weber State	Los Angeles Rams
Jim Reid	T	Virginia	Houston Oilers
Dexter Seigler	DB	Miami (FL)	Miami Dolphins

== Personnel ==
=== Staff ===
1995 Amsterdam Admirals staff
Front office: General Manager – Darrell Roland; Head coaches: Head Coach/Linebackers – Al Luginbill; Offensive coaches: Offensive Coordinator/Offensive Line – Bob Beers; Offensive Assistant – Bob Gambold; Offensive Assistant – Norb Hecker; National Coach/Tight Ends – Marcus Muler	Defensive coaches: Defensive Coordinator/Defensive Backs – Jimmy Carr; Defensive Line – Thurmond Moore

=== Roster ===
1995 Amsterdam Admirals roster
Quarterbacks: 7 Will Furrer; 14 Brad Lebo; 10 Jamie Martin; Running backs: 22 Ralph Dawkins; 23 Troy Stradford; 26 T. C. Wright; Wide receivers: 84 Sanjay Beach; 87 Derek Hill; 83 Ernie Jones; 81 Dedric Smith; Tight ends: 88 Trumane Bell; 80 David Jones; 45 Craig McEwen	Offensive linemen: 62 Rob Baxley G; 67 John Bock G; 71 Mario Cristobal T; 73 Shawn Harper T; 56 Kelvin Harris C; 64 Bret Kwarta G; Defensive linemen: 78 Blaine Berger DT; 97 Mike Evans DT; 98 Bobby Hamilton DE; 75 Garry Howe DT; 95 Jon Kirksey DT; 93 Malcolm Showell DE	Linebackers: 52 Cedric Figaro MLB; 54 Keith Franklin OLB; 58 Anthony McClanahan OLB; 90 Karmeeleyah McGill OLB; Defensive backs: 31 Melvin Aldridge S; 29 Alonza Barnett S; 21 Ron Carpenter S; 27 Robert O'Neal S; 30 Jey Phillips CB; 46 Kelly Sims CB; 28 Sean Washington CB; Special teams: 3 Terry Belden K; 2 Darren Bennett P	National players: 86 (Sweden) Theo Blanco WR; 68 (Sweden) Jesper Johansson T; 35 (Suriname) Rick Koulen CB; 55 (Finland) Markku Makinen C; 99 (Netherlands) Leo Molly DE; 33 (Netherlands) Frank Temming RB; Rookies in italics

== Schedule ==
Week	Date	Kickoff (Note: All times local to where the game was played.)	Opponent	Results		Game site	Attendance
Week	Date	Kickoff	Opponent	Final score	Team record	Game site	Attendance
1	Saturday, April 8	7:00 p.m.	Barcelona Dragons	W 17–13	1–0	Olympisch Stadion	7,168
2	Saturday, April 15	7:00 p.m.	Frankfurt Galaxy	W 14–12	2–0	De Meer Stadion	5,321
3	Sunday, April 23	3:00 p.m.	at London Monarchs	W 17–10	3–0	White Hart Lane	8,763
4	Sunday, April 30	3:00 p.m.	at Scottish Claymores	W 31–0	4–0	Murrayfield Stadium	9,306
5	Saturday, May 6	7:00 p.m.	Rhein Fire	W 30–10	5–0	Olympisch Stadion	8,153
6	Saturday, May 13	5:30 p.m.	at Barcelona Dragons	W 40–34 ^{OT}	6–0	Estadi Olímpic de Montjuïc	18,369
7	Saturday, May 20	7:00 p.m.	Scottish Claymores	W 30–13	7–0	Olympisch Stadion	10,423
8	Sunday, May 28	7:00 p.m.	at Frankfurt Galaxy	L 13–28	7–1	Waldstadion	28,368
9	Saturday, June 3	7:00 p.m.	London Monarchs	W 17–7	8–1	De Meer Stadion	8,469
10	Saturday, June 10	7:00 p.m.	at Rhein Fire	W 37–25	9–1	Rheinstadion	7,961

== Standings ==
World League of American Football
Team	W	L	T	PCT	PF	PA	Home	Road	STK
Amsterdam Admirals	9	1	0	.900	246	152	5–0	4–1	W2
Frankfurt Galaxy	6	4	0	.600	279	202	3–2	3–2	W3
Barcelona Dragons	5	5	0	.500	237	247	2–3	3–2	L1
London Monarchs	4	6	0	.400	174	220	1–4	3–2	L2
Rhein Fire	4	6	0	.400	221	279	2–3	2–3	L3
Scottish Claymores	2	8	0	.200	153	210	0–5	2–3	W1

== Game summaries ==
=== Week 1: vs Barcelona Dragons ===
Week One: Barcelona Dragons at Amsterdam Admirals – Game summary

Quarter	1	2	3	4	Total
Barcelona	0	3	7	3	13
Amsterdam	7	10	0	0	17

at Olympisch Stadion, Amsterdam, Netherlands

- Date: Saturday, April 8
- Game time: 7:00 p.m. CEST
- Game attendance: 7,168

=== Week 2: vs Frankfurt Galaxy ===
Week Two: Frankfurt Galaxy at Amsterdam Admirals – Game summary

Quarter	1	2	3	4	Total
Frankfurt	7	0	0	5	12
Amsterdam	0	14	0	0	14

at De Meer Stadion, Amsterdam, Netherlands

- Date: Saturday, April 15
- Game time: 7:00 p.m. CEST
- Game attendance: 5,321
- Referee: Mike Carey

=== Week 3: at London Monarchs ===
Week Three: Amsterdam Admirals at London Monarchs – Game summary

Quarter	1	2	3	4	Total
Amsterdam	7	3	7	0	17
London	7	3	0	0	10

at White Hart Lane, London, England

- Date: Sunday, April 23
- Game time: 3:00 p.m. BST
- Game attendance: 8,763

=== Week 4: at Scottish Claymores ===
Week Four: Amsterdam Admirals at Scottish Claymores – Game summary

Quarter	1	2	3	4	Total
Amsterdam	7	6	15	3	31
Scotland	0	0	0	0	0

at Murrayfield Stadium, Edinburgh, Scotland

- Date: Saturday, April 30
- Game time: 3:00 p.m. BST
- Game attendance: 9,306

=== Week 5: vs Rhein Fire ===
Week Five: Rhein Fire at Amsterdam Admirals – Game summary

Quarter	1	2	3	4	Total
Rhein	3	0	7	0	10
Amsterdam	6	21	3	0	30

at Olympisch Stadion, Amsterdam, Netherlands

- Date: Saturday, May 6
- Game time: 7:00 p.m. CEST
- Game attendance: 8,153

=== Week 6: at Barcelona Dragons ===
Week Six: Amsterdam Admirals at Barcelona Dragons – Game summary

Quarter	1	2	3	4	OT	Total
Amsterdam	0	20	0	14	6	40
Barcelona	6	9	11	8	0	34

at Estadi Olímpic de Montjuïc, Barcelona, Spain

- Date: Saturday, May 13
- Game time: 5:30 p.m. CEST
- Game attendance: 18,369

=== Week 7: vs Scottish Claymores ===
Week Seven: Scottish Claymores at Amsterdam Admirals – Game summary

Quarter	1	2	3	4	Total
Scotland	7	6	0	0	13
Amsterdam	6	7	7	10	30

at Olympisch Stadion, Amsterdam, Netherlands

- Date: Saturday, May 20
- Game time: 7:00 p.m. CEST
- Game attendance: 10,423

=== Week 8: at Frankfurt Galaxy ===
Week Eight: Amsterdam Admirals at Frankfurt Galaxy – Game summary

Quarter	1	2	3	4	Total
Amsterdam	0	3	7	3	13
Frankfurt	7	7	7	7	28

at Waldstadion, Frankfurt, Germany

- Date: Sunday, May 28
- Game time: 7:00 p.m. CEST
- Game attendance: 28,368

=== Week 9: vs London Monarchs ===
Week Nine: London Monarchs at Amsterdam Admirals – Game summary

Quarter	1	2	3	4	Total
London	0	0	0	7	7
Amsterdam	7	0	7	3	17

at De Meer Stadion, Amsterdam, Netherlands

- Date: Saturday, June 3
- Game time: 7:00 p.m. CEST
- Game attendance: 8,469

=== Week 10: at Rhein Fire ===
Week Ten: Amsterdam Admirals at Rhein Fire – Game summary

Quarter	1	2	3	4	Total
Amsterdam	7	0	7	23	37
Rhein	0	6	0	19	25

at Rheinstadion, Düsseldorf, Germany

- Date: Saturday, June 10
- Game time: 7:00 p.m. CEST
- Game attendance: 7,961
