= 1996 London Monarchs season =

World League of American Football team season

- General manager: Gareth Moores
- Head coach: Bobby Hammond; Lionel Taylor
- Home stadium: White Hart Lane; Stamford Bridge

Results
- Record: 4–6
- Division place: 5th
- Playoffs: Did not qualify

The 1996 London Monarchs season was the fourth season for the franchise in the World League of American Football (WLAF). The team was led by head coach Bobby Hammond in his second year and interim head coach Lionel Taylor. The Monarchs played their home games at Wembley Stadium, White Hart Lane and Stamford Bridge in London, England. They finished the regular season in fifth place with a record of four wins and six losses.

== Offseason ==
=== World League draft ===
1996 London Monarchs World League draft selections
Draft order		Player name	Position	College
Round	Choice	Player name	Position	College
1	3	Russell White	RB	California
2	9	Dunstan Anderson	DE	Tulsa
3	16	Daniel Adams	WR	Houston
4	21	Preston Jones	QB	Georgia
5	28	Sean Crocker	DB	North Carolina
6	33	Profail Grier	RB	Utah State
7	40	Kendall Brown	DE	Louisville
8	45	Mike Suarez	T	Illinois
9	52	Curtis Thomas	WR	Delaware State
10	57	Kevin Gaines	DB	Louisville
11	64	Willie Harris	WR	Mississippi State
12	69	Marc Lamb	T	Montana
13	78	Jim Witherspoon	LB	Ouachita Baptist
14	83	Shar Pourdanesh	T	Nevada
15	90	Roger Ruzek	K	Weber State
16	95	Travis Colquitt	P	Marshall
17	102	Frank Costa	QB	Miami (FL)
18	107	Lawann Latson	WR	Northwestern State
19	114	Gaston Green	RB	UCLA

== Personnel ==
=== Staff ===
1996 London Monarchs staff
Front office: General manager – Gareth Moores; Head coaches: Head coach – Bobby Hammond; Assistant head coach – Jimmy Carr; Offensive coaches: Offensive coordinator – Lionel Taylor; National coach/running backs – Tony Allen; Offensive line – John Payne	Defensive coaches: Defensive coordinator/defensive line – Thurmond Moore; Linebackers – Jimmy Carr; Defensive backs/special teams – Maurice Spencer

=== Roster ===
1996 London Monarchs final roster
Quarterbacks: 12 Frank Costa; 8 Preston Jones; 7 Cree Morris; Running backs: 44 Gaston Green; 22 Profail Grier; 35 Tony Vinson; 1 Russell White; Wide receivers: 86 Linzy Collins; 80 Willie Harris; 85 Edwin Howard; 2 Larry Wallace; Tight ends: 82 Michael Titley	Offensive linemen: 62 Damon Baldwin G; 79 Marc Lamb T; 71 Chris Luneburg T; 78 Everett McIver T; 73 Mike Moody T; 67 Craig Ritter G; 64 Richard Saenz C; 65 Tim Simpson G/C; 68 Terrence Wisdom G; Defensive linemen: 92 Blaine Berger DT; 74 Greg Black DT; 99 Jerry Drake DE; 75 Jeff Hunter DE; 63 A. J. Jenkins DE; 95 William Perry DT	Linebackers: 55 Andre Allen OLB; 52 Ivan Caesar MLB; 58 Darrell Crawford OLB; 97 Horace Morris OLB; 94 Richard Newbill MLB; 56 Nick Smith OLB; Defensive backs: 24 Melvin Aldridge S; 26 Sean Crocker CB; 25 Kevin Gaines S; 28 Kenny McEntyre CB; 23 Mark Montreuil CB; 27 Darren Studstill S; Special teams: 4 Sonny Feexico P; 9 Roger Ruzek K	National players: 87 (England) Gerry Anderson TE; 30 (England) Rowelle Blenman CB; 66 (England) Lewis Capes DE; 29 (England) Victor Ebubedike RB; 83 (New Zealand) Will Hinchcliff WR; 6 (England) Kevin Hurst K; 45 (England) Stephen Hutchinson RB; Rookies in italics

== Schedule ==
Week	Date	Kickoff (Note: All times local to where the game was played.)	Opponent	Results		Game site	Attendance
Week	Date	Kickoff	Opponent	Final score	Team record	Game site	Attendance
1	Sunday, April 14	3:00 p.m.	Scottish Claymores	L 21–24 (OT)	0–1	White Hart Lane	16,258
2	Saturday, April 20	7:00 p.m.	at Frankfurt Galaxy	L 3–37	0–2	Waldstadion	34,186
3	Saturday, April 27	7:00 p.m.	at Rhein Fire	W 27–20	1–2	Rheinstadion	16,104
4	Monday, May 6	3:00 p.m.	Barcelona Dragons	L 7–9	1–3	White Hart Lane	13,627
5	Saturday, May 11	6:30 p.m.	at Amsterdam Admirals	L 9–28	1–4	Olympisch Stadion	8,327
6	Sunday, May 19	3:00 p.m.	Frankfurt Galaxy	W 27–7	2–4	White Hart Lane	10,764
7	Monday, May 27	3:00 p.m.	Amsterdam Admirals	W 16–13	3–4	White Hart Lane	11,048
8	Sunday, June 2	6:00 p.m.	at Barcelona Dragons	L 6–7	3–5	Estadi Olímpic de Montjuïc	9,875
9	Sunday, June 9	3:00 p.m.	at Scottish Claymores	L 28–33	3–6	Murrayfield Stadium	15,461
10	Sunday, June 16	3:00 p.m.	Rhein Fire	W 17–14	4–6	Stamford Bridge	11,125

== Standings ==
World League of American Football
Team	W	L	T	PCT	PF	PA	Home	Road	STK
Scottish Claymores	7	3	0	.700	233	190	5–0	2–3	L1
Frankfurt Galaxy	6	4	0	.600	221	220	3–2	3–2	W2
Amsterdam Admirals	5	5	0	.500	250	210	4–1	1–4	L1
Barcelona Dragons	5	5	0	.500	192	230	4–1	1–4	W1
London Monarchs	4	6	0	.400	161	192	3–2	1–4	W1
Rhein Fire	3	7	0	.300	176	191	2–3	1–4	L2

== Game summaries ==
=== Week 1: vs Scottish Claymores ===
Week One: Scottish Claymores at London Monarchs – Game summary

Quarter	1	2	3	4	OT	Total
Scotland	7	0	7	7	3	24
London	7	14	0	0	0	21

at White Hart Lane, London, England

- Date: Sunday, April 14
- Game time: 3:00 p.m. BST
- Game attendance: 16,258

=== Week 2: at Frankfurt Galaxy ===
Week Two: London Monarchs at Frankfurt Galaxy – Game summary

Quarter	1	2	3	4	Total
London	0	3	0	0	3
Frankfurt	7	14	13	3	37

at Waldstadion, Frankfurt, Germany

- Date: Saturday, April 20
- Game time: 7:00 p.m. CEST
- Game attendance: 34,186

=== Week 3: at Rhein Fire ===
Week Three: London Monarchs at Rhein Fire – Game summary

Quarter	1	2	3	4	Total
London	10	3	0	14	27
Rhein	0	3	0	17	20

at Rheinstadion, Düsseldorf, Germany

- Date: Saturday, April 27
- Game time: 7:00 p.m. CEST
- Game attendance: 16,104

=== Week 4: vs Barcelona Dragons ===
Week Four: Barcelona Dragons at London Monarchs – Game summary

Quarter	1	2	Total
Barcelona			0
London			0

at White Hart Lane, London, England

- Date: Monday, May 6
- Game time: 3:00 p.m. BST
- Game attendance: 13,627

=== Week 5: at Amsterdam Admirals ===
Week Five: London Monarchs at Amsterdam Admirals – Game summary

Quarter	1	2	3	4	Total
London	3	0	6	0	9
Amsterdam	14	0	14	0	28

at Olympisch Stadion, Amsterdam, Netherlands

- Date: Saturday, May 11
- Game time: 6:30 p.m. CEST
- Game attendance: 8,327

=== Week 6: vs Frankfurt Galaxy ===
Week Six: Frankfurt Galaxy at London Monarchs – Game summary

Quarter	1	2	3	4	Total
Frankfurt	0	0	0	7	7
London	14	6	0	7	27

at White Hart Lane, London, England

- Date: Sunday, May 19
- Game time: 3:00 p.m. BST
- Game attendance: 10,764

=== Week 7: vs Amsterdam Admirals ===
Week Seven: Amsterdam Admirals at London Monarchs – Game summary

Quarter	1	2	3	4	Total
Amsterdam	0	0	6	7	13
London	0	3	6	7	16

at White Hart Lane, London, England

- Date: Monday, May 27
- Game time: 3:00 p.m. BST
- Game attendance: 11,048

=== Week 8: at Barcelona Dragons ===
Week Eight: London Monarchs at Barcelona Dragons – Game summary

Quarter	1	2	Total
London			0
Barcelona			0

at Estadi Olímpic de Montjuïc, Barcelona, Spain

- Date: Sunday, June 2
- Game time: 6:00 p.m. CEST
- Game attendance: 9,875

=== Week 9: at Scottish Claymores ===
Week Nine: London Monarchs at Scottish Claymores – Game summary

Quarter	1	2	3	4	Total
London	7	0	7	14	28
Scotland	4	13	0	16	33

at Murrayfield Stadium, Edinburgh, Scotland

- Date: Sunday, June 9
- Game time: 3:00 p.m. BST
- Game attendance: 15,461

=== Week 10: vs Rhein Fire ===
Week Ten: Rhein Fire at London Monarchs – Game summary

Quarter	1	2	3	4	Total
Rhein	0	0	0	14	14
London	7	7	0	3	17

at Stamford Bridge, London, England

- Date: Sunday, June 16
- Game time: 3:00 p.m. BST
- Game attendance: 11,125
