= 1996 Rhein Fire season =

World League of American Football team season

- General manager: Alexander Leibkind
- Head coach: Galen Hall
- Home stadium: Rheinstadion

Results
- Record: 3–7
- Division place: 6th
- Playoffs: did not qualify

The 1996 Rhein Fire season was the second season for the Rhein Fire in the World League of American Football (WLAF). The team was led by head coach Galen Hall in his second year, and played its home games at Rheinstadion in Düsseldorf, Germany. They finished the regular season in sixth place with a record of three wins and seven losses.

== Offseason ==
=== World League draft ===
1996 Rhein Fire World League draft selections
Draft order		Player name	Position	College
Round	Choice	Player name	Position	College
1	2	Sylvester Stanley	DT	Michigan
2	8	Sebastian Savage	DB	North Carolina State
3	17	Terry Richardson	RB	Syracuse
4	20	Tommie Stowers	TE	Missouri
5	29	Steve Hoyem	T	Stanford
6	32	Percy Snow	LB	Michigan State
7	41	Stacy Evans	DE	South Carolina
8	44	Kevin Knox	WR	Florida State
9	53	Willie Gaston	DB	Alabama
10	56	Jerone Davison	RB	Arizona State
11	65	James Roberson	DE	Florida State
12	68	Ricky Andrews	LB	Washington
12	74	James Wilson	DE	Tennessee
13	79	Jason Carthen	LB	Ohio
14	82	Larry Kennedy	DB	Florida
15	91	Myron Glass	DB	Northern Iowa
16	94	Ontiwaun Carter	RB	Arizona
17	103	Leo Araguz	P	Stephen F. Austin
18	106	Jamal Cox	LB	Georgia Tech
19	115	Riddick Parker	DT	North Carolina
20	118	Eric Green	WR	Benedictine College
21	125	Brad Parpan	QB	Villanova
22	128	Tuli Mateialona	LB	New Mexico
23	135	Larry Davis	DT	UTEP

== Personnel ==
=== Staff ===
1996 Rhein Fire staff
Front office: General Manager – Alexander Leibkind; Head coaches: Head Coach/Running Backs – Galen Hall; Offensive coaches: Offensive Coordinator/Quarterbacks – Pete Levine; Wide Receivers – Wes Chandler; Offensive Line – Dean Unruh	Defensive coaches: Defensive Coordinator/Linebackers – Pete Kuharchek; National Coach/Defensive Line – Walter Rohlfing; Defensive Backs/Special Teams – Steve Carson

=== Roster ===
1996 Rhein Fire final roster
Quarterbacks: 12 Terry Dean; 7 Andy Kelly; 5 Brad Parpan; Running backs: 24 Ontiwaun Carter; 43 Derrick Clark; 33 Jerone Davison; 32 Terry Richardson; Wide receivers: 1 Tommie Boyd; 81 Kevin Knox; 84 Manley Woods; Tight ends: 82 Byron Chamberlain; 89 Tommie Stowers	Offensive linemen: 60 Mike Alexander C; 69 Derek Allen G; 77 Steve Hardin G; 76 Steve Hoyem T; 55 Bob Kronenberg C; 73 Jose Munoz T; Defensive linemen: 98 Dunstan Anderson DE; 78 Stacy Evans DE; 79 Chuckie Johnson DT; 96 Riddick Parker DT; 72 James Roberson DE; 63 Buster Stanley DT; 90 Lance Teichelman DT; 74 James Wilson DE	Linebackers: 91 Ricky Andrews; 99 Jason Carthen; 48 Jamal Cox; 50 Anthony Fieldings; 95 Percy Snow; Defensive backs: 29 Donald Douglas S; 27 Jamal Ellis CB; 40 Matt Gay S; 28 Myron Glass CB; 22 Larry Kennedy CB; 42 Mike Salmon S; 20 Sebastian Savage CB; Special teams: 2 Leo Araguz P/K	National players: 58 (Germany) Claus Biedermann LB; 10 (Germany) Manfred Burgsmüller K; 23 (Germany) Markus Finke RB; 75 (Germany) Peter Gross-Pass DE; 71 (Germany) Olaf Hampel T/G; 94 (Japan) Takahiro Ikenoue LB; 56 (Japan) Shigemasa Ito LB; 21 (Germany) Andreas Motzkus S; Rookies in italics

== Schedule ==
Week	Date	Kickoff (Note: All times local to where the game was played.)	Opponent	Results		Game site	Attendance
Week	Date	Kickoff	Opponent	Final score	Team record	Game site	Attendance
1	Saturday, April 13	7:00 p.m.	Frankfurt Galaxy	L 21–27	0–1	Rheinstadion	32,092
2	Saturday, April 20	6:30 p.m.	at Amsterdam Admirals	L 7–17	0–2	Olympisch Stadion	8,492
3	Saturday, April 27	7:00 p.m.	London Monarchs	L 20–27	0–3	Rheinstadion	16,104
4	Saturday, May 4	7:00 p.m.	Scottish Claymores	W 15–14	1–3	Rheinstadion	11,395
5	Sunday, May 12	6:00 p.m.	at Barcelona Dragons	L 19–21	1–4	Estadi Olímpic de Montjuïc	15,742
6	Sunday, May 19	3:00 p.m.	at Scottish Claymores	L 19–24	1–5	Murrayfield Stadium	12,419
7	Saturday, May 25	7:00 p.m.	Barcelona Dragons	W 16–12	2–5	Rheinstadion	13,173
8	Saturday, June 1	7:00 p.m.	at Frankfurt Galaxy	W 31–8	3–5	Waldstadion	38,798
9	Sunday, June 9	3:00 p.m.	Amsterdam Admirals	L 14–24	3–6	Rheinstadion	20,103
10	Sunday, June 16	3:00 p.m.	at London Monarchs	L 14–17	3–7	Stamford Bridge	11,125

== Standings ==
World League of American Football
Team	W	L	T	PCT	PF	PA	Home	Road	STK
Scottish Claymores	7	3	0	.700	233	190	5–0	2–3	L1
Frankfurt Galaxy	6	4	0	.600	221	220	3–2	3–2	W2
Amsterdam Admirals	5	5	0	.500	250	210	4–1	1–4	L1
Barcelona Dragons	5	5	0	.500	192	230	4–1	1–4	W1
London Monarchs	4	6	0	.400	161	192	3–2	1–4	W1
Rhein Fire	3	7	0	.300	176	191	2–3	1–4	L2

== Game summaries ==
=== Week 1: vs Frankfurt Galaxy ===
Week One: Frankfurt Galaxy at Rhein Fire – Game summary

Quarter	1	2	3	4	Total
Frankfurt	10	0	7	10	27
Rhein	0	0	7	14	21

at Rheinstadion, Düsseldorf, Germany

- Date: Saturday, April 13
- Game time: 7:00 p.m. CEST
- Game attendance: 32,092

=== Week 2: at Amsterdam Admirals ===
Week Two: Rhein Fire at Amsterdam Admirals – Game summary

Quarter	1	2	3	4	Total
Rhein	0	0	0	7	7
Amsterdam	3	0	7	7	17

at Olympisch Stadion, Amsterdam, Netherlands

- Date: Saturday, April 20
- Game time: 6:30 p.m. CEST
- Game attendance: 8,492

=== Week 3: vs London Monarchs ===
Week Three: London Monarchs at Rhein Fire – Game summary

Quarter	1	2	3	4	Total
London	10	3	0	14	27
Rhein	0	3	0	17	20

at Rheinstadion, Düsseldorf, Germany

- Date: Saturday, April 27
- Game time: 7:00 p.m. CEST
- Game attendance: 16,104

=== Week 4: vs Scottish Claymores ===
Week Four: Scottish Claymores at Rhein Fire – Game summary

Quarter	1	2	3	4	Total
Scotland	7	0	0	7	14
Rhein	6	3	3	3	15

at Rheinstadion, Düsseldorf, Germany

- Date: Saturday, May 4
- Game time: 7:00 p.m. CEST
- Game attendance: 11,395

=== Week 5: at Barcelona Dragons ===
Week Five: Rhein Fire at Barcelona Dragons – Game summary

Quarter	1	2	3	4	Total
Rhein	0	7	0	12	19
Barcelona	6	12	0	3	21

at Estadi Olímpic de Montjuïc, Barcelona, Spain

- Date: Sunday, May 12
- Game time: 6:00 p.m. CEST
- Game attendance: 15,742

=== Week 6: at Scottish Claymores ===
Week Six: Rhein Fire at Scottish Claymores – Game summary

Quarter	1	2	3	4	Total
Rhein	3	3	7	6	19
Scotland	13	11	0	0	24

at Murrayfield Stadium, Edinburgh, Scotland

- Date: Sunday, May 19
- Game time: 3:00 p.m. BST
- Game attendance: 12,419

=== Week 7: vs Barcelona Dragons ===
Week Seven: Barcelona Dragons at Rhein Fire – Game summary

Quarter	1	2	3	4	Total
Barcelona	0	3	9	0	12
Rhein	6	7	0	3	16

at Rheinstadion, Düsseldorf, Germany

- Date: Saturday, May 25
- Game time: 7:00 p.m. CEST
- Game attendance: 13,173

=== Week 8: at Frankfurt Galaxy ===
Week Eight: Rhein Fire at Frankfurt Galaxy – Game summary

Quarter	1	2	3	4	Total
Rhein	21	7	0	3	31
Frankfurt	0	0	0	8	8

at Waldstadion, Frankfurt, Germany

- Date: Saturday, June 1
- Game time: 7:00 p.m. CEST
- Game attendance: 38,798

=== Week 9: vs Amsterdam Admirals ===
Week Nine: Amsterdam Admirals at Rhein Fire – Game summary

Quarter	1	2	3	4	Total
Amsterdam	0	10	0	14	24
Rhein	7	0	7	0	14

at Rheinstadion, Düsseldorf, Germany

- Date: Sunday, June 9
- Game time: 3:00 p.m. CEST
- Game attendance: 20,103

=== Week 10: at London Monarchs ===
Week Ten: Rhein Fire at London Monarchs – Game summary

Quarter	1	2	3	4	Total
Rhein	0	0	0	14	14
London	7	7	0	3	17

at Stamford Bridge, London, England

- Date: Sunday, June 16
- Game time: 3:00 p.m. BST
- Game attendance: 11,125

== Statistics ==
=== Team statistics ===
	Rhein	Opponents
Total first downs	180	170
Rushing	57	48
Passing	101	103
Penalty	22	19
Third down: made / attempts	49 / 127	42 / 124
Third down percentage	38.6	33.9
Fourth down: made / attempts	7 / 12	5 / 8
Fourth down percentage	58.3	62.5
Possession average	29:57	30:03
Total net yards	2,708	2,958
Average per game	270.8	295.8
Total plays	600	573
Average per play	4.5	5.2
Net yards rushing	954	720
Average per game	95.4	72.0
Total rushes	225	218
Net yards passing	1,754	2,238
Average per game	175.4	223.8
Sacked / yards lost	19 / 134	19 / 132
Gross yards	1,888	2,370
Attempts / completions	356 / 205	336 / 201
Completion percentage	57.6	59.8
Had intercepted	12	11
Punts / average	41 / 42.3	47 / 40.1
Net punting average	37.9	34.1
Penalties / yards	61 / 448	83 / 648
Fumbles / ball lost	17 / 9	15 / 8
Touchdowns	22	22
Rushing	6	6
Passing	13	14
Returns	3	2

Score by periods	Q1	Q2	Q3	Q4	OT	Points
Team	43	30	24	79	0	176
Opponents	56	46	23	66	0	191
