= 1996 Scottish Claymores season =

World League of American Football team season

- General manager: Mike Keller
- Head coach: Jim Criner
- Home stadium: Murrayfield Stadium

Results
- Record: 7–3
- Division place: 1st
- Playoffs: World Bowl '96 champions

The 1996 Scottish Claymores season was the second season for the franchise in the World League of American Football (WLAF). The team was led by head coach Jim Criner in his second year, and played its home games at Murrayfield Stadium in Edinburgh, Scotland. They finished the regular season in first place with a record of seven wins and three losses. In World Bowl '96, Scotland defeated the Frankfurt Galaxy 32–27. The victory marked the franchise's first World Bowl championship, in its second active season.

The Claymores had gained the right to play as home team in the World Bowl in week 5. They beat the Galaxy 20–0 at the Waldstadion, taking the World Bowl berth as the midseason leaders. This ended an eight-game winning streak from 1995–96 for the Galaxy.

== Offseason ==
=== World League draft ===
1996 Scottish Claymores World League draft selections
Draft order		Player name	Position	College
Round	Choice	Player name	Position	College
1	1	Ty Parten	DT	Arizona
2	7	Shannon Jones	LB	USC
3	18	Yo Murphy	WR	Idaho
4	19	John DeWitt	DE	Vanderbilt
5	30	Mazio Royster	RB	USC
6	31	Frank Robinson	DB	Boise State
7	42	Arnold Ale	LB	UCLA
8	43	Steve Shine	LB	Northwestern
9	54	Tyrone Johnson	WR	Western State
10	55	Chris Williams	DT	Hampton
11	66	Basil Proctor	LB	West Virginia
12	67	Ron Dickerson, Jr.	WR	Arkansas
12	73	Ken Grace	WR	USC
13	80	Kris Pollack	G	USC
14	81	Jessie Cox	LB	Texas Southern
15	92	Lee Gissendaner	WR	Northwestern
16	93	Brian White	DB	Dartmouth
17	104	Scott Tyner	P/K	Oklahoma State
18	105	Herman Carroll	DE	Mississippi State
19	116	Joe O'Brien	DT	Boise State
20	117	Mike Lee	WR	Utah State
21	126	Aaron Bennetts	TE	UC Davis
22	127	Jared Kaaiohelo	RB	Missouri Southern

== Personnel ==
=== Staff ===
1996 Scottish Claymores staff
Front office: General Manager – Mike Keller; Head coaches: Head Coach/Offensive Line – Jim Criner; Offensive coaches: Offensive Coordinator/Quarterbacks – Jim Sochor; National Coach/Running Backs – Mike Kenny; Receivers – Vince Alcalde	Defensive coaches: Defensive Coordinator/Defensive Backs – Ray Willsey; Defensive Line – Bill Dutton; Linebackers – Larry Owens

=== Roster ===
1996 Scottish Claymores final roster
Quarterbacks: 13 Jim Ballard; 7 Khari Jones; 12 Steve Matthews; Running backs: 23 Ron Dickerson; 31 Jared Kaaiohelo; 27 Siran Stacy; 40 Markus Thomas; Wide receivers: 89 Aaron Bennetts; 1 Lee Gissendaner; 84 Derek Hill; 88 Sean LaChapelle; 83 Yo Murphy; Tight ends: 85 Willy Tate	Offensive linemen: 71 Tom Barndt G; 72 Randy Bierman T; 65 Chris Dausin C/G; 79 Purvis Hunt G; 75 James Spencer T; 68 Matt Storm G; 78 Keith Wagner T; 61 Lance Zeno C; Defensive linemen: 70 Jason Buck DE; 74 Herman Carroll DE; 97 John DeWitt DE; 99 Jerold Jeffcoat DT; 90 Joe O'Brien DT; 95 Ty Parten DT; 67 Bryan Proby DT	Linebackers: 56 Arnold Ale OLB; 58 Shannon Jones OLB; 52 Karmeeleyah McGill OLB; 54 Mark Sander MLB; 59 David Webb OLB; Defensive backs: 45 Israel Byrd CB (IR); 34 George Coghill S; 42 Forey Duckett CB; 30 James Fuller S; 46 Marvin Goodwin S; 43 Frank Robinson CB; 22 James Williams CB; 25 David Wilson S; Special teams: 5 Paul McCallum K/P	National players: 81 (Scotland) Scott Couper WR; 91 (England) Robert Flickinger DE; 15 (Scotland) Gavin Hastings K; 26 (Finland) Jukka-Pekka Nummi CB; 44 (Scotland) Ben Torriero RB; 51 (Republic of Ireland) Emmett Waldron MLB; Rookies in italics

== Schedule ==
Week	Date	Kickoff (Note: All times local to where the game was played.)	Opponent	Results		Game site	Attendance
Week	Date	Kickoff	Opponent	Final score	Team record	Game site	Attendance
1	Sunday, 14 April	3:00 p.m.	at London Monarchs	W 24–21 (OT)	1–0	White Hart Lane	16,258
2	Sunday, 21 April	3:00 p.m.	Barcelona Dragons	W 23–13	2–0	Murrayfield Stadium	12,928
3	Sunday, 28 April	3:00 p.m.	Amsterdam Admirals	W 21–14	3–0	Murrayfield Stadium	13,070
4	Saturday, 4 May	7:00 p.m.	at Rhein Fire	L 14–15	3–1	Rheinstadion	11,395
5	Saturday, 11 May	7:00 p.m.	at Frankfurt Galaxy	W 20–0	4–1	Waldstadion	32,126
6	Sunday, 19 May	3:00 p.m.	Rhein Fire	W 24–19	5–1	Murrayfield Stadium	12,419
7	Sunday, 26 May	3:00 p.m.	Frankfurt Galaxy	W 20–17	6–1	Murrayfield Stadium	13,116
8	Saturday, 1 June	6:30 p.m.	at Amsterdam Admirals	L 27–31	6–2	Olympisch Stadion	10,501
9	Sunday, 9 June	3:00 p.m.	London Monarchs	W 33–28	7–2	Murrayfield Stadium	15,461
10	Sunday, 16 June	6:00 p.m.	at Barcelona Dragons	L 27–32	7–3	Estadi Olímpic de Montjuïc	16,124
World Bowl '96
11	Sunday, 23 June	6:00 p.m.	Frankfurt Galaxy	W 32–27	8–3	Murrayfield Stadium	38,982

== Standings ==
World League of American Football
Team	W	L	T	PCT	PF	PA	Home	Road	STK
Scottish Claymores	7	3	0	.700	233	190	5–0	2–3	L1
Frankfurt Galaxy	6	4	0	.600	221	220	3–2	3–2	W2
Amsterdam Admirals	5	5	0	.500	250	210	4–1	1–4	L1
Barcelona Dragons	5	5	0	.500	192	230	4–1	1–4	W1
London Monarchs	4	6	0	.400	161	192	3–2	1–4	W1
Rhein Fire	3	7	0	.300	176	191	2–3	1–4	L2

== Game summaries ==
=== Week 1: at London Monarchs ===
Week One: Scottish Claymores at London Monarchs – Game summary

Quarter	1	2	3	4	OT	Total
Scotland	7	0	7	7	3	24
London	7	14	0	0	0	21

at White Hart Lane, London, England

- Date: Sunday, 14 April
- Game time: 3:00 p.m. BST
- Game attendance: 16,258

=== Week 2: vs Barcelona Dragons ===
Week Two: Barcelona Dragons at Scottish Claymores – Game summary

Quarter	1	2	Total
Barcelona			0
Scotland			0

at Murrayfield Stadium, Edinburgh, Scotland

- Date: Sunday, 21 April
- Game time: 3:00 p.m. BST
- Game attendance: 12,928

=== Week 3: vs Amsterdam Admirals ===
Week Three: Amsterdam Admirals at Scottish Claymores – Game summary

Quarter	1	2	3	4	Total
Amsterdam	7	0	7	0	14
Scotland	7	7	0	7	21

at Murrayfield Stadium, Edinburgh, Scotland

- Date: Sunday, 28 April
- Game time: 3:00 p.m. BST
- Game attendance: 13,070

=== Week 4: at Rhein Fire ===
Week Four: Scottish Claymores at Rhein Fire – Game summary

Quarter	1	2	3	4	Total
Scotland	7	0	0	7	14
Rhein	6	3	3	3	15

at Rheinstadion, Düsseldorf, Germany

- Date: Saturday, 4 May
- Game time: 7:00 p.m. CEST
- Game attendance: 11,395

=== Week 5: at Frankfurt Galaxy ===
Week Five: Scottish Claymores at Frankfurt Galaxy – Game summary

Quarter	1	2	3	4	Total
Scotland	3	0	3	14	20
Frankfurt	0	0	0	0	0

at Waldstadion, Frankfurt, Germany

- Date: Saturday, 11 May
- Game time: 7:00 p.m. CEST
- Game attendance: 32,126

=== Week 6: vs Rhein Fire ===
Week Six: Rhein Fire at Scottish Claymores – Game summary

Quarter	1	2	3	4	Total
Rhein	3	3	7	6	19
Scotland	13	11	0	0	24

at Murrayfield Stadium, Edinburgh, Scotland

- Date: Sunday, 19 May
- Game time: 3:00 p.m. BST
- Game attendance: 12,419

=== Week 7: vs Frankfurt Galaxy ===
Week Seven: Frankfurt Galaxy at Scottish Claymores – Game summary

Quarter	1	2	3	4	Total
Frankfurt	7	0	3	7	17
Scotland	0	3	14	3	20

at Murrayfield Stadium, Edinburgh, Scotland

- Date: Sunday, 26 May
- Game time: 3:00 p.m. BST
- Game attendance: 13,116

=== Week 8: at Amsterdam Admirals ===
Week Eight: Scottish Claymores at Amsterdam Admirals – Game summary

Quarter	1	2	3	4	Total
Scotland	0	0	21	6	27
Amsterdam	0	10	7	14	31

at Olympisch Stadion, Amsterdam, Netherlands

- Date: Saturday, 1 June
- Game time: 6:30 p.m. CEST
- Game attendance: 10,501

=== Week 9: vs London Monarchs ===
Week Nine: London Monarchs at Scottish Claymores – Game summary

Quarter	1	2	3	4	Total
London	7	0	7	14	28
Scotland	4	13	0	16	33

at Murrayfield Stadium, Edinburgh, Scotland

- Date: Sunday, 9 June
- Game time: 3:00 p.m. BST
- Game attendance: 15,461

=== Week 10: at Barcelona Dragons ===
Week Ten: Scottish Claymores at Barcelona Dragons – Game summary

Quarter	1	2	Total
Scotland			0
Barcelona			0

at Estadi Olímpic de Montjuïc, Barcelona, Spain

- Date: Sunday, 16 June
- Game time: 6:00 p.m. CEST
- Game attendance: 16,124
