= 1996 Amsterdam Admirals season =

World League of American Football team season

- General manager: Bill Peterson
- Head coach: Al Luginbill
- Home stadium: Olympisch Stadion

Results
- Record: 5–5
- Division place: 3rd
- Playoffs: Did not qualify

The 1996 Amsterdam Admirals season was the second season for the franchise in the World League of American Football (WLAF). The team was led by head coach Al Luginbill in his second year, and played its home games at Olympisch Stadion in Amsterdam, Netherlands. They finished the regular season in third place with a record of five wins and five losses.

== Offseason ==
=== World League draft ===
1996 Amsterdam Admirals World League draft selections
Draft order		Player name	Position	College
Round	Choice	Player name	Position	College
1	5	Jerry Crafts	T	Louisville
2	11	Willie Williams	T	Louisiana State
3	14	Rico Mack	LB	Appalachian State
4	23	Ed Stewart	LB	Nebraska
5	26	Carlos Etheredge	TE	Miami
6	35	Jim Hanna	DT	Louisville
7	38	Rodney Harris	WR	Kansas
8	47	Kelvin Anderson	RB	Southeast Missouri State
9	50	Alex Shell	WR	Arkansas State
10	59	Mark Caesar	DT	Miami
11	62	Jason Childs	T	North Dakota
12	71	Beno Bryant	RB	Washington
13	76	Brian Gelzheiser	LB	Penn State
14	85	Adam Vinatieri	K	South Dakota State
15	88	Joe Smigiel	T	Arizona
16	97	Alonza Barnett	DB	North Carolina A&T
17	100	William Pollard	WR	Notre Dame
18	109	Corey Barlow	DB	Auburn
19	112	Randall Evans	WR	St. Augustine's
20	120	Derrick Farrell	DE	Louisiana State
21	123	Joey Ellis	DB	Texas
22	130	Dedric Smith	WR	Savannah State
23	133	Darrell Asberry	QB	Jackson State

== Personnel ==
=== Staff ===
1996 Amsterdam Admirals staff
Front office: General Manager – Bill Peterson; Head coaches: Head Coach/Defensive Coordinator – Al Luginbill; Offensive coaches: Offensive Coordinator/Quarterbacks/Wide Receivers – Joe Clark; Running Backs – Louis Clark; Offensive Line – Mark McHale; National Coach/Tight Ends – Marcus Muler	Defensive coaches: Defensive Line – Al Tanara; Linebackers/Secondary – Tim Prukop

=== Roster ===
1996 Amsterdam Admirals final roster
Quarterbacks: 7 Will Furrer; 10 Mike McCoy; 12 John Sacca; 11 Erik White; Running backs: 23 Beno Bryant; 22 Trevor Cobb; 26 T. C. Wright; Wide receivers: 81 Phillip Bobo; 88 Darren Chandler; 87 Tony Jones; 1 Dedric Smith; Tight ends: 82 Carlos Etheredge; 80 David Jones	Offensive linemen: 76 Jason Childs G; 78 Jerry Crafts T; 71 Mario Cristobal C; 79 Kevin Farkas T; 74 Zev Lumelski T; 72 Marcus Spears G; 73 Willie Williams G/T; 66 Donald Willis G/C; Defensive linemen: 97 Mike Evans DT; 98 Bobby Hamilton DE; 93 Jim Hanna DT; 75 Garry Howe DT; 96 Troy Ridgley DT; 95 Malcolm Showell DE; 77 Jay Williams DE	Linebackers: 58 Paschall Davis; 90 Brian Forde; 54 Keith Franklin; 53 Brian Gelzheiser; 55 Rico Mack; 57 Ed Stewart; Defensive backs: 29 Alonza Barnett S; 38 Darrick Davis CB; 35 Derric Griggs CB; 32 Torey Hunter CB; 34 Tommy Jones CB; 27 Robert O'Neal S; 30 Jey Phillips S; 28 John Reece CB; 46 Kelly Sims CB; 24 Claudius Wright CB; Special teams: 5 Adam Vinatieri K/P	National players: 52 (Japan) Takuro Abe LB; 21 (Netherlands) Rey Agaoglu S; 86 (Sweden) Theo Blanco WR; 84 (Netherlands) Arnold Galesloot TE; 69 (Sweden) Jorgen Gustafsson T; 99 (Netherlands) Leo Molly DE; 33 (Netherlands) Frank Temming RB; 10 (Netherlands) Hans Werdekker K; Rookies in italics

== Schedule ==
Week	Date	Kickoff (Note: All times local to where the game was played.)	Opponent	Results		Game site	Attendance
Week	Date	Kickoff	Opponent	Final score	Team record	Game site	Attendance
1	Sunday, April 14	6:00 p.m.	at Barcelona Dragons	L 27–34 ^{OT}	0–1	Estadi Olímpic de Montjuïc	17,300
2	Saturday, April 20	6:30 p.m.	Rhein Fire	W 17–7	1–1	Olympisch Stadion	8,492
3	Sunday, April 28	3:00 p.m.	at Scottish Claymores	L 14–21	1–2	Murrayfield Stadium	13,070
4	Sunday, May 5	7:00 p.m.	at Frankfurt Galaxy	L 28–40	1–3	Waldstadion	28,627
5	Saturday, May 11	6:30 p.m.	London Monarchs	W 28–9	2–3	Olympisch Stadion	8,327
6	Saturday, May 18	6:30 p.m.	Barcelona Dragons	W 48–14	3–3	Olympisch Stadion	8,712
7	Monday, May 27	3:00 p.m.	at London Monarchs	L 13–16	3–4	White Hart Lane	11,048
8	Saturday, June 1	6:30 p.m.	Scottish Claymores	W 31–27	4–4	Olympisch Stadion	10,501
9	Sunday, June 9	3:00 p.m.	at Rhein Fire	W 24–14	5–4	Rheinstadion	20,103
10	Saturday, June 15	6:30 p.m.	Frankfurt Galaxy	L 20–28	5–5	Olympisch Stadion	14,062

== Standings ==
World League of American Football
Team	W	L	T	PCT	PF	PA	Home	Road	STK
Scottish Claymores	7	3	0	.700	233	190	5–0	2–3	L1
Frankfurt Galaxy	6	4	0	.600	221	220	3–2	3–2	W2
Amsterdam Admirals	5	5	0	.500	250	210	4–1	1–4	L1
Barcelona Dragons	5	5	0	.500	192	230	4–1	1–4	W1
London Monarchs	4	6	0	.400	161	192	3–2	1–4	W1
Rhein Fire	3	7	0	.300	176	191	2–3	1–4	L2

== Game summaries ==
=== Week 1: at Barcelona Dragons ===
Week One: Amsterdam Admirals at Barcelona Dragons – Game summary

Quarter	1	2	3	4	OT	Total
Amsterdam	14	7	0	6	0	27
Barcelona	7	7	7	6	7	34

at Estadi Olímpic de Montjuïc, Barcelona, Spain

- Date: Sunday, April 14
- Game time: 6:00 p.m. CEST
- Game attendance: 17,300

=== Week 2: vs Rhein Fire ===
Week Two: Rhein Fire at Amsterdam Admirals – Game summary

Quarter	1	2	3	4	Total
Rhein	0	0	0	7	7
Amsterdam	3	0	7	7	17

at Olympisch Stadion, Amsterdam, Netherlands

- Date: Saturday, April 20
- Game time: 6:30 p.m. CEST
- Game attendance: 8,492

=== Week 3: at Scottish Claymores ===
Week Three: Amsterdam Admirals at Scottish Claymores – Game summary

Quarter	1	2	3	4	Total
Amsterdam	7	0	7	0	14
Scotland	7	7	0	7	21

at Murrayfield Stadium, Edinburgh, Scotland

- Date: Sunday, April 28
- Game time: 3:00 p.m. BST
- Game attendance: 13,070

=== Week 4: at Frankfurt Galaxy ===
Week Four: Amsterdam Admirals at Frankfurt Galaxy – Game summary

Quarter	1	2	3	4	Total
Amsterdam	0	14	14	0	28
Frankfurt	14	20	0	6	40

at Waldstadion, Frankfurt, Germany

- Date: Sunday, May 5
- Game time: 7:00 p.m. CEST
- Game attendance: 28,627

=== Week 5: vs London Monarchs ===
Week Five: London Monarchs at Amsterdam Admirals – Game summary

Quarter	1	2	3	4	Total
London	3	0	6	0	9
Amsterdam	14	0	14	0	28

at Olympisch Stadion, Amsterdam, Netherlands

- Date: Saturday, May 11
- Game time: 6:30 p.m. CEST
- Game attendance: 8,327

=== Week 6: vs Barcelona Dragons ===
Week Six: Barcelona Dragons at Amsterdam Admirals – Game summary

Quarter	1	2	3	4	Total
Barcelona	0	7	7	0	14
Amsterdam	14	20	7	7	48

at Olympisch Stadion, Amsterdam, Netherlands

- Date: Saturday, May 18
- Game time: 6:30 p.m. CEST
- Game attendance: 8,712

=== Week 7: at London Monarchs ===
Week Seven: Amsterdam Admirals at London Monarchs – Game summary

Quarter	1	2	3	4	Total
Amsterdam	0	0	6	7	13
London	0	3	6	7	16

at White Hart Lane, London, England

- Date: Monday, May 27
- Game time: 3:00 p.m. BST
- Game attendance: 11,048

=== Week 8: vs Scottish Claymores ===
Week Eight: Scottish Claymores at Amsterdam Admirals – Game summary

Quarter	1	2	3	4	Total
Scotland	0	0	21	6	27
Amsterdam	0	10	7	14	31

at Olympisch Stadion, Amsterdam, Netherlands

- Date: Saturday, June 1
- Game time: 6:30 p.m. CEST
- Game attendance: 10,501

=== Week 9: at Rhein Fire ===
Week Nine: Amsterdam Admirals at Rhein Fire – Game summary

Quarter	1	2	3	4	Total
Amsterdam	0	10	0	14	24
Rhein	7	0	7	0	14

at Rheinstadion, Düsseldorf, Germany

- Date: Sunday, June 9
- Game time: 3:00 p.m. CEST
- Game attendance: 20,103

=== Week 10: vs Frankfurt Galaxy ===
Week Ten: Frankfurt Galaxy at Amsterdam Admirals – Game summary

Quarter	1	2	3	4	Total
Frankfurt	13	8	7	0	28
Amsterdam	7	7	0	6	20

at Olympisch Stadion, Amsterdam, Netherlands

- Date: Saturday, June 15
- Game time: 6:30 p.m. CEST
- Game attendance: 14,062
