= Andre Allen =

Andre Allen may refer to:

- Andre Allen (offensive lineman) (born 1971), Canadian football offensive lineman
- Andre Allen (defensive end) (born 1973), Canadian football defensive end
