= John de Witt =

John de Witt may refer to:

- Johan de Witt (1625–1672), Dutch politician who was assassinated
- John L. DeWitt (1880–1962), U.S. general in World War II who helped initiate the Japanese-American internment
- John DeWitt (athlete) (1881–1930), American college football player and Olympic hammer thrower
- John H. DeWitt Jr. (1906–1999), American pioneer in radio broadcasting, radar astronomy and photometry
- John DeWitt (gridiron football) (born 1970), American arena football lineman
- John DeWitt, pseudonymous author of some of the Anti-Federalist Papers
