= Riddick Parker =

American football player (1972–2022)

No. 97
- Position: Defensive tackle

Personal information
- Born: November 20, 1972; Emporia, Virginia, U.S.
- Died: August 19, 2022 (aged 49); Chesterfield, Virginia, U.S.
- Listed height: 6 ft 3 in (1.91 m)
- Listed weight: 295 lb (134 kg)

Career information
- High school: Southampton (Courtland, Virginia)
- College: North Carolina
- NFL draft: 1995: undrafted

Career history
- San Diego Chargers (1995)*; Rhein Fire (1996); Seattle Seahawks (1996–2000); New England Patriots (2001); New York Jets (2002)*; New England Patriots (2002)*; Baltimore Ravens (2002–2003); San Francisco 49ers (2004)*
- * Offseason or practice squad member only
- Stats at Pro Football Reference

Riddick Thurston Parker Jr. (November 20, 1972 – August 19, 2022) was an American professional football player who was a defensive lineman for seven seasons in the National Football League (NFL). He played for the Seattle Seahawks, New England Patriots, and Baltimore Ravens from 1997 to 2003. Parker played college football for the North Carolina Tar Heels.

== Early life ==
Parker was born in Emporia, Virginia, on November 20, 1972. He attended Southampton High School in nearby Courtland, Virginia, where he played for its football team and received all-state honors in 1989. He then studied history and communications at the University of North Carolina at Chapel Hill, graduating with a bachelor's degree in 1994. He played for the North Carolina Tar Heels, joining as a scholarship true freshman and ultimately lettering in all four years. Undrafted in the 1995 NFL draft, Parker signed as a rookie free agent with the San Diego Chargers, but was waived prior to the start of the 1995 season. He then played for the Rhein Fire of NFL Europe for the 1996 season, before signing with the Seattle Seahawks in July of that same year.

== Professional career ==
Parker made his NFL debut with the Seahawks on August 31, 1997, at the age of 25, in a 41–3 loss against the New York Jets. During his rookie season, he served as the team's reserve defensive lineman, playing in 12 games and recording three tackles. He then posted seven tackles and one sack in 8 games during the 1998 season, having fended off a challenge from Carl Hansen for the franchise's number 4 defensive tackle. Regarded as small for a player in his position, Parker increased his weight from 274 pounds (124 kg) to 300 pounds (140 kg) in 1999. He subsequently had a breakthrough year, starting all 16 games for the Seahawks during the 2000 season and recording a career-best 48 tackles. In the ninth game of the season on October 29, 2000, he made a career-high nine tackles in a 24–19 loss to the Kansas City Chiefs.

Parker became a free agent after the 2000 season and signed with the New England Patriots on June 5 of the following year. He won his only Super Bowl ring when the Patriots emerged victorious in the Super Bowl XXXVI. However, he did not play in the championship game. Parker spent his last two years in the NFL with the Baltimore Ravens. He signed with the San Francisco 49ers on August 7, 2004, but retired after being released the following month.

== Later life ==
After retiring from professional football, Parker worked as a financial adviser with Legg Mason. He earned a graduate certificate in school administration and supervision from Johns Hopkins University, before obtaining a Master of Public Administration from Walden University. He was subsequently employed as an education consultant working on literacy development and graduation pathway programs for Baltimore City Public Schools, before becoming an assistant principal at Armstrong High School.

Parker was promoted to principal of George Wythe High School in Richmond, Virginia, during the summer of 2021. He died suddenly while bicycling, on the morning of August 19, 2022, in Chesterfield, Virginia.
