= Jon Kirksey =

American football player (born 1970)

No. 95, 65
- Position: Defensive tackle

Personal information
- Born: February 21, 1970 (age 56); Greenville, South Carolina, U.S.
- Listed height: 6 ft 4 in (1.93 m)
- Listed weight: 350 lb (159 kg)

Career information
- High school: Riverside (Greer, South Carolina)
- College: Bakersfield (1989–1990); Sacramento State (1991–1992)
- NFL draft: 1993: 8th round, 221st overall pick

Career history
- New Orleans Saints (1993)*; San Francisco 49ers (1994)*; Green Bay Packers (1994)*; Amsterdam Admirals (1995); St. Louis Rams (1995–1996); Amsterdam Admirals (1998–2001); Carolina Panthers (2000)*; Los Angeles Xtreme (2001)
- * Offseason or practice squad member only

Awards and highlights
- Second-team All-World League (1995)

Career NFL statistics
- Tackles: 4
- Stats at Pro Football Reference

Jonathan O'Neal Kirksey (born February 21, 1970) is an American former professional football player who was a defensive tackle in the National Football League (NFL) for the St. Louis Rams and in NFL Europe for the Amsterdam Admirals. He played college football for the Bakersfield Renegades and Sacramento State Hornets.

== Early life ==
Jonathan O'Neal Kirksey was born on February 21, 1970, in Greenville, South Carolina. He played high school football at Riverside High School in Greer, South Carolina, earning All-American and All-State honors. He was also an All-American in the shot put and discus in high school.

== College career ==
Kirksey played college football at Bakersfield College from 1989 to 1990. He earned junior college All-American and first-team All-Western State Conference honors in 1990.

He transferred to play at California State University, Sacramento from 1991 to 1992. He accumulated 18 tackles and 2.0 sacks his junior year in 1991, earning All-American and All-Conference honors. Kirksey totaled 54 tackles, five sacks, and five fumble recoveries as a senior in 1992, garnering All-American and All-Conference recognition for the second consecutive season.

== Professional career ==
Kirksey was selected by the New Orleans Saints in the 8th round, with the 221st overall pick, of the 1993 NFL draft. He officially signed with the team on July 15, 1993, and was released on August 24, 1993.

Kirksey signed with the San Francisco 49ers on June 10, 1994, and was released on August 22, 1994.

He was signed to the practice squad of the Green Bay Packers on December 27, 1994. He became a free agent after the season.

He played for the Amsterdam Admirals of the World League of American Football (WLAF) during the 1995 WLAF season, and made 7.0 sacks.

Kirksey signed with the St. Louis Rams on July 11, 1995, and was released on August 27. He was later signed to the team's practice squad on September 9 and was promoted to the active roster on December 20, 1995, but did not appear in a game that season. He played in 11 games, starting one, for the Rams during the 1996 season, recording four solo tackles. He became a free agent on February 14, 1997, and re-signed with the team on February 18, 1997. Kirksey was released by the Rams on August 23, 1997.

Kirksey then returned to the Amsterdam Admirals in 1998 and played for the team through the 2001 season. He totaled 10 defensive tackles and 2.0 sacks in 1998, 13 defensive tackles and 1.0 sack in 1999, seven defensive tackles, 0.5 sacks, and one pass breakup in 2000, and seven defensive tackles and 0.5 sacks in 2001.

He signed with the Carolina Panthers on July 17, 2000, and was released on August 26, 2000.

Kirksey followed Admirals head coach Al Luginbill to the Los Angeles Xtreme of the XFL in 2001.
