= Jerry Drake =

Jerry Drake may refer to:

- Jerry Drake, alter ego of Mister No
- Jerry Drake (American football) (born 1969), American football player
