= Sam Bakhtiar =

Iranian American fitness entrepreneur (1973–2020)

- Born: 1 May 1973; Tehran, Iran
- Died: 23 December 2020 (aged 47)
- Occupation: Fitness entrepreneur
- Years active: 1973–2020

Sam Bakhtiar (1 May 1973 – 23 December 2020) was an Iranian American fitness entrepreneur and author.

== Life and career ==
Sam was born in Tehran. At the age of 11, he and his mother left Iran as refugees to the USA. Upon leaving Iran, he moved to the United States. He held a bachelor's degree of sports science and life science from the Pennsylvania State University and a doctorate from Los Angeles College of Chiropractic. He was the co-founder of The Camp Fitness Franchise. He was one of the finalists of the Ernst & Young Entrepreneur of the Year Award in 2017.

== Death ==
Sam died on 23 December 2020 at the age of 47. According to a comment on his official YouTube channel he died due to "heart problems."

== Books ==
- Total Body Transformation Secrets: Fitness Concepts Formula ISBN 978-1-4528947-5-1
- Becoming a One-Percenter ISBN 978-0-9998316-0-1
