= Ivan Caesar =

US Virgin Islands gridiron football player (1967–2008)

No. 53, 52
- Position: Linebacker

Personal information
- Born: January 7, 1967; St. Thomas, U.S. Virgin Islands
- Died: April 28, 2008 (aged 41); Orlando, Florida, U.S.
- Listed height: 6 ft 1 in (1.85 m)
- Listed weight: 228 lb (103 kg)

Career information
- High school: Dorchester (MA)
- College: Boston College
- NFL draft: 1991: 11th round, 286th overall pick

Career history
- Minnesota Vikings (1991); Philadelphia Eagles (1993); Tampa Bay Storm (1995–1996); London Monarchs (1996); Portland Forest Dragons (1998); Milwaukee Mustangs (1999)

Awards and highlights
- 2× ArenaBowl champion (1995, 1996)

Career NFL statistics
- Fumble recoveries: 2
- Stats at Pro Football Reference

Career AFL statistics
- Tackles: 21
- Sacks: 5
- Fumble recoveries: 4
- Stats at ArenaFan.com

Ivan Orsen J. Caesar II (January 7, 1967 – April 28, 2008) was an American professional football linebacker who played one season with the Minnesota Vikings of the National Football League (NFL) as well as four seasons in the Arena Football League (AFL).

Pre-draft measurables
Height	Weight	Arm length	Hand span	Bench press
6 ft 1 3/8 in (1.86 m)	237 lb (108 kg)	33 in (0.84 m)	9 7/8 in (0.25 m)	19 reps

He was selected 286th overall by the Vikings in the 11th round of the 1991 NFL draft. He also played for the London Monarchs in 1996. Caesar attended Dorchester High School in Dorchester, Massachusetts and Boston College.

Caesar was shot and killed in his Orlando, Florida home on April 28, 2008.
