= Bob Meeks =

American gridiron football player (born 1969)

No. 61, 63
- Position: Center

Personal information
- Born: May 28, 1969 (age 57); Andalusia, Alabama, U.S.
- Listed height: 6 ft 2 in (1.88 m)
- Listed weight: 279 lb (127 kg)

Career information
- High school: Evergreen (Evergreen, Alabama)
- College: Auburn (1987–1991)
- NFL draft: 1992: 10th round, 278th overall pick

Career history
- Denver Broncos (1993); Baltimore Stallions (1995); Barcelona Dragons (1996)

Awards and highlights
- Grey Cup champion (1995)

Career NFL statistics
- Games played: 8
- Return yards: 9
- Stats at Pro Football Reference

Robert Earl Meeks Jr. (born May 28, 1969) is an American former professional football player who was a center in the National Football League (NFL) for the Denver Broncos, the Canadian Football League (CFL) for the Baltimore Stallions and the World League of American Football (WLAF) for the Barcelona Dragons. He played college football for the Auburn Tigers.

== Professional career ==
=== Denver Broncos ===
Meeks was selected by the Denver Broncos in the tenth round, with the 278th overall pick, of the 1992 NFL draft. He officially signed with the team on July 17 but did not appear in any games for the Broncos during the 1992 season.

The 1993 season saw his first game appearance in the Week 1 game with a win against the New York Jets. He played in the first eight games of the season for the Broncos and recorded one kick return for nine yards in a win against the Indianapolis Colts in Week 4.

Ahead of the 1994 season, on August 23, Meeks was placed on injured reserve and missed the entire season. He was released on July 11, 1995 and then signed with Broncos again on July 12. Meeks was released again on August 22, ahead of the start of the 1995 season.

=== Baltimore Stallions ===
Meeks would be signed by the Baltimore Stallions of the Canadian Football League on September 5, 1995, where they would win the 83rd Grey Cup.

=== Barcelona Dragons ===
Meeks was selected by the Barcelona Dragons with the 22nd pick in the fourth round of the 1996 WLAF draft. He would make the final roster for the Dragons as a center.

== NFL career statistics ==
Year	Team	Games		Kick returns				
Year	Team	GP	GS	Ret	Yds	Avg	Lng	TD
1993	DEN	8	0	1	9	9.0	9	0
Career		8	0	1	9	9.0	9	0
