= Keith Franklin =

American gridiron football player (born 1970)

No. 54, 58, 11, 18
- Position: Linebacker

Personal information
- Born: March 4, 1970 (age 56); Los Angeles, California, U.S.
- Listed height: 6 ft 2 in (1.88 m)
- Listed weight: 230 lb (104 kg)

Career information
- High school: Dorsey (Los Angeles)
- College: South Carolina
- NFL draft: 1993: undrafted

Career history
- Phoenix Cardinals (1993)*; Los Angeles Raiders (1994)*; Amsterdam Admirals (1995); Los Angeles Rams (1995)*; Oakland Raiders (1995–1996); → Amsterdam Admirals (1996); Barcelona Dragons (1998); BC Lions (1999-2000); Birmingham Thunderbolts (2001)
- * Offseason or practice squad member only

Career XFL statistics
- Total tackles: 14
- Sacks: 1
- FF / FR: 1 / 0
- Stats at Pro Football Reference

Career CFL statistics
- Total tackles: 13
- Sacks: 1
- Interceptions: 1

Keith Lamont Franklin (born March 4, 1970) is an American former professional football player who was a linebacker in the National Football League (NFL). He played college football for the South Carolina Gamecocks. He was signed as an undrafted free agent by the NFL's Los Angeles Raiders.

He also spent time playing for the Amsterdam Admirals and Barcelona Dragons of the World League of American Football (WLAF), later known as NFL Europe, BC Lions of the Canadian Football League (CFL), and the Birmingham Thunderbolts of the short-lived XFL.

== Early life ==
Franklin attended the University of South Carolina where he was a two-year starter. As a senior, he recorded 39 tackles.

== Professional career ==
After going unselected in the 1994 NFL draft, Franklin was signed by the Los Angeles Raiders. In 1995, he played for the Amsterdam Admirals of the World League of American Football (WLAF) later known as NFL Europe. Later in the year, he appeared in two games for the Raiders. In 1996, with the Admirals, he recorded 55 tackles and one sack and two interceptions. He joined the Barcelona Dragons in 1998 but missed the season due to an injury. In 1999, he joined the BC Lions of the Canadian Football League (CFL), where he recorded 13 tackles, one sack and one interception. In 2000, he recorded 32 tackles and one sack. In 2001, he joined the Birmingham Thunderbolts of the XFL.
