= Everett McIver =

American football player (born 1970)

No. 74, 66, 67, 78
- Position: Guard

Personal information
- Born: August 5, 1970 (age 56); Cumberland County, North Carolina, U.S.
- Listed height: 6 ft 5 in (1.96 m)
- Listed weight: 325 lb (147 kg)

Career information
- High school: Seventy-First (Fayetteville, North Carolina)
- College: Elizabeth City State
- NFL draft: 1993: undrafted

Career history
- San Diego Chargers (1993)*; Dallas Cowboys (1993)*; New York Jets (1993–1995); → London Monarchs (1996); Miami Dolphins (1996–1997); Dallas Cowboys (1998–1999); Atlanta Falcons (2000)*
- * Offseason or practice squad member only

Awards and highlights
- 3× All-CIAA (1990, 1991, 1992); 2× CIAA Defensive player of the year (1991, 1992); Sheridan Black College All-American (1992); Pigskin Club of Washington Player of the Year (1992)

Career NFL statistics
- Games played: 59
- Games started: 43
- Fumble recoveries: 1
- Stats at Pro Football Reference

Everett McIver (born August 5, 1970) is an American former professional football player who was an offensive guard in the National Football League (NFL) for the New York Jets, Miami Dolphins and Dallas Cowboys. He also was a member of the London Monarchs in the World League of American Football (WLAF). He played college football for the Elizabeth City State Vikings.

== Early life ==
McIver attended Seventy-First High School in Fayetteville, North Carolina. He played defensive tackle and received All-state honors as a senior. He was also on the track team.

He accepted a football scholarship from Elizabeth City State University, starting at defensive end his first 3 seasons. As a junior, he had 15 tackles and 2 sacks against Winston-Salem State University.

As a senior, he moved to defensive tackle. He was a three-time All-CIAA selection and the conference's defensive player of the year in his last two seasons.

In 2009, he was inducted into the Elizabeth City State University Sports Hall of Fame.

== Professional career ==
=== San Diego Chargers ===
McIver was signed as an undrafted free agent by the San Diego Chargers after the 1993 NFL draft on April 27. He was waived on July 23.

=== Dallas Cowboys (first stint) ===
In July 1993, the Dallas Cowboys signed McIver with the intention of converting him into an offensive tackle. He was waived on August 30 and two days later added to the practice squad. He was cut on December 7.

=== New York Jets ===
On December 10, 1993, McIver was signed to the New York Jets' practice squad. He was promoted to the active roster on January 2 but was declared inactive in the season finale against the Houston Oilers.

In 1994, he was declared inactive for the first 8 games. He appeared in 4 games and was declared inactive for an additional 4 games.

In 1995, he received his first NFL start at left tackle in place of an injured Matt Willig against the Buffalo Bills. He faced future hall of famer Bruce Smith and in a play that was ruled a false start, Smith hit quarterback Boomer Esiason, knocking him out with a concussion that caused him to miss the next six weeks. He started the next 3 contests, before missing the game against the New England Patriots with a concussion. He played on special teams in the last 6 games.

McIver was allocated to the World League of American Football (WLAF) for seasoning in 1996, where he was named starter at left tackle for the London Monarchs. He was released from the Jets on August 7.

=== Miami Dolphins ===
On August 13, 1996, he was signed by the Miami Dolphins as a free agent. He was cut after three weeks and was later re-signed on October 7. He was named the starter at right guard against the Pittsburgh Steelers, replacing an injured Chris Gray, and he started the last 5 games.

In 1997, McIver earned the starting right guard position over Gray. He sprained his left knee against the New York Jets, causing him to miss two games (14 starts). During the 1998 offseason, the Dolphins focused on signing free agent Kevin Donnalley and McIver eventually decided to change teams.

=== Dallas Cowboys (second stint) ===
On February 24, 1998, the Dallas Cowboys signed McIver as a free agent, because they saw a player coming into his own and with the potential for taking over Nate Newton's guard position. In training camp, he was involved in one of the most controversial episodes in Cowboys franchise history, when future Hall of Fame receiver Michael Irvin stabbed him in the neck, leaving him with a potentially fatal two-inch gash. The media named the incident "Scissor gate" after the details of the event were covered up. McIver healed in time to start the first 5 games at right guard, before spraining the MCL in his right knee. He missed the next five contests and returned against the Seattle Seahawks, only to suffer an MCL tear in his left knee and being placed on the injured reserve list on November 24.

The next season, he started 14 games at right guard. He was waived on February 12, 2000.

=== Atlanta Falcons ===
On July 24, 2000, he signed as a free agent with the Atlanta Falcons. He was released on August 19.

== Scissor gate ==
In 1998, Michael Irvin allegedly inflicted a two-inch cut in the neck of McIver with a pair of barber's scissors, after apparently arguing over which of the two would get their hair cut first, while some team members were also in the room. McIver did not press charges, and it was rumored that Irvin paid a six-figure settlement with him to drop the matter. The incident came to be known as "Scissor gate".

== Personal life ==
In 1997, he won the celebrity division in the Cal Dixon Celebrity Offshore Fishing Classic.

McIver had a daughter, Morquisha, who died at 3 months old while undergoing heart surgery.
