= James Roberson (American football) =

American football player (born 1971)

No. 90, 92
- Position: Defensive end

Personal information
- Born: May 3, 1971 (age 55); Bartow, Florida, U.S.
- Listed height: 6 ft 3 in (1.91 m)
- Listed weight: 275 lb (125 kg)

Career information
- High school: Lake Wales (Lake Wales, Florida)
- College: Florida State
- NFL draft: 1995: undrafted

Career history
- New Orleans Saints (1995)*; Green Bay Packers (1995)*; Rhein Fire (1996); Houston/Tennessee Oilers (1996–1998); Jacksonville Jaguars (1999); Orlando Rage (2001)
- * Offseason or practice squad member only

Awards and highlights
- National champion (1993)

Career NFL statistics
- Games played–started: 42–21
- Tackles: 43
- Sacks: 6
- Stats at Pro Football Reference

James Earl Roberson (born May 3, 1971) is an American former professional football player who was a defensive end for four seasons for the Houston/Tennessee Oilers and the Jacksonville Jaguars of the National Football League (NFL). Originally undrafted, Roberson was a starting defensive end/outside linebacker playing college football for the Florida State Seminoles' 1993 NCAA national championship team.
