= Al Luginbill =

American football player and coach (born 1946)

Biographical details
- Born: November 13, 1946 (age 79); Pomona, California, U.S.

Playing career
- 1965–1967: Cal Poly Pomona
- Position: Halfback

Coaching career (HC unless noted)
- 1968–1971: Pasadena (assistant)
- 1972–1973: Arizona State (assistant)
- 1974–1976: Pasadena (assistant)
- 1977: Pasadena
- 1978: Wyoming (DB)
- 1979–1981: Arizona State (LB)
- 1982–1984: Arizona State (DC)
- 1989–1993: San Diego State
- 1995–2000: Amsterdam Admirals
- 2001: Los Angeles Xtreme
- 2003: Detroit Fury

Administrative career (AD unless noted)
- 1985–1988: San Diego State (associate AD)
- 2003: Detroit Fury (GM)

Head coaching record
- Overall: 31–25–3 (college); 11–1 (junior college); 52–39 (professional)
- Bowls: 0–1 (college); 2–0 (junior college)
- Tournaments: 3–2 (professional playoffs)

Accomplishments and honors

Championships
- 1 Metropolitan Conference (1977); 1 Million Dollar Game (2001)

Awards
- WAC Coach of the Year (1991)

John Alan Luginbill (born November 13, 1946) is an American former football coach. He served as the head football coach at San Diego State University from 1989 to 1993, compiling a record of 31–25–3. Luginibull was also the head football coach at Pasadena City College in Pasadena, California for one season, in 1977, leading his team a record of 11–1 and a victory in the Junior Rose Bowl. At the end of his career, Luginbill was the head coach for three professional teams: the Amsterdam Admirals of NFL Europe from 1995 to 2000, the Los Angeles Xtreme of the XFL in 2001, and the Detroit Fury of the Arena Football League (AFL) in 2003. His Los Angeles Xtreme team won the XFL championship, the Million Dollar Game.

== College coaching career ==
Luginbill began his college coaching career at Pasadena City College, where he served as an assistant from 1968 to 1971 and returned from 1974 to 1976. In 1977 Luginbill was promoted to head coach and guided PCC to a Jr. Rose Bowl Championship, National Championship and finished the regular season with a record of 11–1.

Luginbill got his Division I college break with the Arizona State Sun Devils. He worked at ASU for two years as assistant coach. After a one-year stint with the University of Wyoming, he returned to Arizona State. Luginbill remained as a coach at ASU until 1984, when he left to enter the athletic administration at San Diego State University.

After spending three years on the administrative side, Luginbill was given control of a slumping Aztec program. Three years later, Luginbill's Aztecs went 8–4–1, including a 52-all tie with BYU before 56,737 at Jack Murphy Stadium. While at SDSU, Luginbill recruited running back Marshall Faulk. Luginbill served as head coach of the Aztecs for five years, where he earned an overall record of 31–25–3. In those five years, he never suffered a losing season.

Luginbill is currently Director of Player Personnel at Arizona State University.

== Professional coaching career ==
Luginbill served as the inaugural head coach for the Amsterdam Admirals of NFL Europe from 1995 to 2000. He led the Admirals to a 34–26 record. Amsterdam went 9–1 in 1995 and played in the World Bowl.

After coaching in Europe, Luginbill returned to the States to serve as the head coach and director of football operations for the XFL’s Los Angeles Xtreme. In the league’s first and only year, he guided the Xtreme to a championship.

Luginbill served as head coach and general manager for the Detroit Fury of the Arena Football League in 2003.

== Personal life ==
Luginbill and his wife, Susan, are the parents of twins, a daughter, Kerry, and a son, Tom, who is a college football analyst for ESPN.

== Head coaching record ==
=== Junior college football ===
Year	Team	Overall	Conference	Standing	Bowl/playoffs
Pasadena Lancers (Metropolitan Conference) (1977)
1977	Pasadena	11–1	5–1	1st	W Potato Bowl, W Junior Rose Bowl
Pasadena:		11–1	5–1		
Total:		11–1			
National championship Conference title Conference division title or championship game berth

=== College ===
Year	Team	Overall	Conference	Standing	Bowl/playoffs
San Diego State Aztecs (Western Athletic Conference) (1989–1993)
1989	San Diego State	6–5–1	4–3	T–5th	
1990	San Diego State	6–5	5–2	3rd	
1991	San Diego State	8–4–1	6–1–1	2nd	L Freedom
1992	San Diego State	5–5–1	5–3	4th	
1993	San Diego State	6–6	4–4	T–6th	
San Diego State:		31–25–3	24–13–1		
Total:		31–25–3			

=== NFL Europe ===
Team	Year	Regular season					Postseason			
Team	Year	Won	Lost	Ties	Win %	Finish	Won	Lost	Win %	Result
AMS	1995	9	1	0	.900	1st (League)	0	1	.000	Lost to Frankfurt Galaxy in World Bowl '95
AMS	1996	5	5	0	.500	3rd (League)	–	–	—	—
AMS	1997	5	5	0	.500	4th (League)	–	–	—	—
AMS	1998	7	3	0	.700	3rd (League)	–	–	—	—
AMS	1999	4	6	0	.400	4th (League)	–	–	—	—
AMS	2000	4	6	0	.400	4th (League)	–	–	—	—
Total		34	26	0	.567		0	1	.000	

=== XFL ===
Team	Year	Regular season					Postseason			
Team	Year	Won	Lost	Ties	Win %	Finish	Won	Lost	Win %	Result
LAX	2001	7	3	0	.700	1st (Western)	2	0	1.000	Million Dollar Game champions
Total		7	3	0	.700		2	0	1.000	

=== Arena Football League ===
Team	Year	Regular season					Postseason			
Team	Year	Won	Lost	Ties	Win %	Finish	Won	Lost	Win %	Result
DTF	2003	8	8	0	.500	2nd (National Eastern)	1	1	.500	Lost to Tampa Bay Storm in quarterfinals
Total		8	8	0	.500		1	1	.500	
