= Frank Robinson (American football) =

American football player (born 1969)

No. 23, 36, 43
- Position: Cornerback

Personal information
- Born: January 11, 1969 (age 57); Newark, New Jersey, U.S.
- Listed height: 5 ft 11 in (1.80 m)
- Listed weight: 175 lb (79 kg)

Career information
- High school: Novato (Novato, California)
- College: Boise State
- NFL draft: 1992: 5th round, 137th overall pick

Career history
- Denver Broncos (1992)*; Cincinnati Bengals (1992); Denver Broncos (1992–1993); Jacksonville Jaguars (1995)*; Scottish Claymores (1996)
- * Offseason or practice squad member only

Awards and highlights
- World Bowl '96 champion

Career NFL statistics
- Interceptions: 1
- Fumble recoveries: 1
- Stats at Pro Football Reference

Frank Lawson Robinson (born January 11, 1969) is an American former professional football player who was a cornerback for two seasons in the National Football League (NFL) for the Cincinnati Bengals and Denver Broncos. He played college football for the Boise State Broncos and was selected by the Broncos in the fifth round of the 1992 NFL draft. He also played for the Scottish Claymores in NFL Europe.
