= Herman Carroll =

American football player (born 1971)

No. 74
- Position: Defensive end

Personal information
- Born: June 20, 1971 (age 55); Natchez, Mississippi, U.S.
- Listed height: 6 ft 4 in (1.93 m)
- Listed weight: 265 lb (120 kg)

Career information
- High school: North Natchez
- College: Mississippi State (1989–1993)
- NFL draft: 1994: 5th round, 142nd overall pick

Career history
- New Orleans Saints (1994–1995); Scottish Claymores (1996)

Awards and highlights
- World Bowl champion (1996)

Career NFL statistics
- Games played: 4
- Stats at Pro Football Reference

Herman D. Carroll Jr. (born June 20, 1971) is an American former professional football player who was a defensive end for the New Orleans Saints of the National Football League (NFL). He played college football for the Mississippi State Bulldogs. Carroll also had a stint with the Scottish Claymores of the World League of American Football (WLAF).

== Early life ==
Carroll was born on June 20, 1971, in Natchez, Mississippi, where he attended North Natchez High School. At defensive end, he had 140 tackles, six fumble recoveries and scored two touchdowns. On February 8, 1989, Carroll signed a National Letter of Intent to play college football at Mississippi State University.

== College career ==
Carroll played college football for the Mississippi State Bulldogs from 1989 to 1993 and was a four-year letterman. Prior to the start of the 1989 season, he injured his knee in a high school all-star game, missing the entire year. Carroll then switched from linebacker to defensive end ahead of the 1991 season. As a senior, he had 80 tackles and a team-leading five sacks.

== Professional career ==
Carroll was selected in the fifth round, with the 142nd overall selection, by the New Orleans Saints in the 1994 NFL draft. He played in the final four games of the 1994 season but did not record any statistics. On August 22, 1995, Carroll was waived by the team.

On February 22, 1996, Carroll was selected in the 18th round, with the 105th overall selection, by the Scottish Claymores in the 1996 WLAF draft. He logged 14 tackles, 3.5 sacks and two pass deflections, as the team won World Bowl '96.
