= Rico Mack =

American football player (born 1971)

No. 56, 55, 51
- Position: Linebacker

Personal information
- Born: February 22, 1971 (age 55); Statham, Georgia, U.S.
- Listed height: 6 ft 4 in (1.93 m)
- Listed weight: 239 lb (108 kg)

Career information
- High school: Winder-Barrow (Winder, Georgia)
- College: Appalachian State (1989–1992)

Career history
- Chicago Bears (1993)*; Pittsburgh Steelers (1993–1994); Amsterdam Admirals (1996); St. Louis Rams (1996); Dallas Cowboys (1997)*; Amsterdam Admirals (1998); Buffalo Destroyers (1999–2000); Los Angeles Xtreme (2001)
- * Offseason or practice squad member only

Awards and highlights
- XFL champion (2001)
- Stats at Pro Football Reference
- Stats at ArenaFan.com

Rico Rodrigus Mack (born February 22, 1971) is an American former professional football linebacker who played one season with the Pittsburgh Steelers of the National Football League (NFL). He played college football at Appalachian State University.

== Early life and college ==
Rico Rodrigus Mack was born on February 22, 1971, in Statham, Georgia. He played high school football at Winder-Barrow High School in Winder, Georgia and earned All-Area honors.

Mack was a four-year letterman for the Appalachian State Mountaineers of Appalachian State University from 1989 to 1992. He was a three-year starter at linebacker. He led the team in tackles during his sophomore and junior seasons. As a senior in 1992, Mack was the captain of the defense and tied for the team lead in tackles.

== Professional career ==
After going undrafted in the 1993 NFL draft, Mack signed with the Chicago Bears on April 29, 1993. He was released on August 19, 1993.

Mack was signed to the practice squad of the Pittsburgh Steelers on August 31, 1993. He was promoted to the active roster on November 1 and played in eight games for the Steelers during the 1993 season. He also appeared in one playoff game that year. Mack was placed on injured reserve on August 22, 1994, and missed the entire 1994 season. He was released by the Steelers the next year on August 21, 1995.

Mack played in all ten games for the Amsterdam Admirals of the World League of American Football in 1996, recording 79 tackles, two sacks, one forced fumble, six pass breakups, and one interception that he returned 90 yards for a touchdown.

Mack signed with the St. Louis Rams on July 9, 1996. He suffered a season-ending knee injury, and was placed on injured reserve on August 21, 1996. He was waived on April 22, 1997.

Mack was claimed off waivers by the Dallas Cowboys on April 25, 1997. He was released on August 11, 1997.

Mack returned to the Admirals in 1998 and played for them during the 1998 season as a defensive end, totaling 27 tackles, 3.5 sacks, two forced fumbles, and five pass breakups.

He played in all 14 games for the Buffalo Destroyers of the Arena Football League (AFL) in 1999, accumulating seven solo tackles, seven assisted tackles, one sack, one forced fumble, one fumble recovery, six pass breakups, and one reception for a one-yard touchdown. He was an offensive lineman/defensive lineman during his time in the AFL as the league played under ironman rules. Mack appeared in the first four games of the 2000 season, recording one solo tackle and one pass breakup, before being placed on recallable waivers on April 26, 2000.

In October 2000, Mack was selected by the Los Angeles Xtreme in the 19th round, with the 145th overall pick, of the 2001 XFL draft. He played in all ten games, starting nine, for the Xtreme during the 2001 season, and posted 0.5 sacks. On April 21, 2001, the Xtreme beat the San Francisco Demons in the Million Dollar Game to win the XFL championship.
