= Sebastian Savage =

American football player (born 1969)

No. 23, 32, 20
- Position: Defensive back

Personal information
- Born: December 12, 1969 (age 56); Carlisle, South Carolina, U.S.
- Listed height: 5 ft 10 in (1.78 m)
- Listed weight: 187 lb (85 kg)

Career information
- College: NC State
- NFL draft: 1993: 5th round, 139th overall pick

Career history
- Buffalo Bills (1993)*; Denver Broncos (1994)*; Washington Redskins (1994–1995); Rhein Fire (1996)
- * Offseason or practice squad member only

Awards and highlights
- 2× First-team All-ACC (1991, 1992)

Career NFL statistics
- Tackles: 1
- Stats at Pro Football Reference

Sebastian Eugene Savage (born December 12, 1969) is an American former professional football player who was a cornerback in the National Football League (NFL) for the Washington Redskins. He played college football for the NC State Wolfpack and was selected 139th overall by the Buffalo Bills in the fifth round of the 1993 NFL draft.
