= Paschall Davis =

American football player (born 1969)

No. 55, 52
- Position: Linebacker

Personal information
- Born: June 5, 1969 (age 57); Bryan, Texas, U.S.
- Listed height: 6 ft 2 in (1.88 m)
- Listed weight: 225 lb (102 kg)

Career information
- High school: Hearne (Hearne, Texas)
- College: Texas A&M–Kingsville
- NFL draft: 1992: undrafted

Career history
- Denver Broncos (1992)*; Sacramento Gold Miners (1993); Shreveport Pirates (1994); St. Louis Rams (1995–1996); Amsterdam Admirals (1996); Atlanta Falcons (1997)*
- * Offseason or practice squad member only
- Stats at Pro Football Reference

Paschall Tederall Davis (born June 5, 1969) is an American former professional football player who was a linebacker in the Canadian Football League (CFL) and National Football League (NFL). He played college football for the Texas A&M–Kingsville Javelinas. Davis played in the CFL for the Sacramento Gold Miners in 1993 and the Shreveport Pirates in 1994. He played in the NFL for the St. Louis Rams from 1995 to 1996.
