= Steve Hoyem =

American football player (born 1970)

No. 76
- Position: Offensive tackle

Personal information
- Born: November 12, 1970 (age 56); Boise, Idaho, U.S.
- Listed height: 6 ft 7 in (2.01 m)
- Listed weight: 287 lb (130 kg)

Career information
- High school: Boise
- College: Stanford (1989–1993)
- NFL draft: 1994: undrafted

Career history
- Buffalo Bills (1994–1995); Rhein Fire (1996)

Career NFL statistics
- Games played: 6
- Stats at Pro Football Reference

Steven Randell Hoyem (born November 12, 1970) is an American former professional football player who was a tackle for the Buffalo Bills of the National Football League (NFL). He played college football for the Stanford Cardinal.

== Early life ==
Hoyem was born on November 12, 1970, in Boise, Idaho, where he attended Boise High School. He was an all-state offensive lineman and committed to play college football at Stanford University.

== College career ==
Hoyem played college football for the Stanford Cardinal from 1989 to 1993 and was a four-year letterman from 1990 to 1993. After he redshirted his first season, he played four years at tackle for Stanford.

== Professional career ==
=== Buffalo Bills ===
After going unselected in the 1994 NFL draft, Hoyem signed with the Buffalo Bills as an undrafted free agent. After he made the initial 53-man roster, he played in six games during his rookie season. On August 31, 1995, Hoyem was waived with an injury settlement due to a nerve injury.

=== Rhein Fire ===
On February 22, 1996, Hoyem was selected by the Rhein Fire of the World League of American Football (WLAF) in the 1996 free agent draft. He played at offensive tackle for the Fire and made one tackle. Hoyem was released at the end of the season.
