= John DeWitt (gridiron football) =

American football player and chiropractor (born 1970)

No. 97, 57, 50, 90, 73
- Position: Offensive line / Defensive line

Personal information
- Born: November 13, 1970 (age 55); Fort Smith, Arkansas, U.S.
- Listed height: 6 ft 4 in (1.93 m)
- Listed weight: 285 lb (129 kg)

Career information
- High school: Southside (Fort Smith, Arkansas)
- College: Vanderbilt
- NFL draft: 1994: undrafted

Career history

Playing
- Houston Oilers (1995)*; Scottish Claymores (1996, 1998); Nashville Kats (1997); Buffalo Destroyers (1999–2000); San Francisco Demons (2001); Las Vegas Outlaws (2001); Montreal Alouettes (2001); Los Angeles Avengers (2001–2003); Las Vegas Gladiators (2004)
- * Offseason or practice squad member only

Coaching
- Southside HS (AR) (1994) Assistant coach

Awards and highlights
- World Bowl champion (1996)

Career AFL statistics
- Total tackles: 54
- Sacks: 6
- Passes broken up: 9
- FF / FR: 1 / 6

Career CFL statistics
- Total tackles: 4
- Stats at ArenaFan.com

John Donovan DeWitt (born November 13, 1970) is an American chiropractor and former arena football offensive line / defensive lineman. He played college football at Vanderbilt.

== Professional career ==
After going undrafted in the 1994 NFL draft, he tried out for the San Francisco 49ers. He then joined the Houston Oilers in 1995. On August 23, 1995, he was waived by the Oilers.

DeWitt was drafted in the fourth round (19th overall) of the 1996 World League Draft by the Scottish Claymores of the World League of American Football (later NFL Europe). He spent 1997, with the newly formed Nashville Kats of the Arena Football League (AFL). That season, he recorded 11 tackles, one sack, two pass break-ups, and two fumble recoveries. In 1998, he returned to the Scottish Claymores.

In 1999, DeWitt returned to arena football, joining the Buffalo Destroyers. That season, he recorded 12 tackles, 1.5 sacks, one pass break-up, one forced fumble, two fumble recoveries. In 2000, he recorded seven tackles, one sack, and two fumble recoveries. He joined the San Francisco Demons of the short-lived XFL as a member of their practice squad. He later joined the Las Vegas Outlaws. While in the XFL, he recorded seven tackles. He then joined the Montreal Alouettes of the Canadian Football League (CFL). While with the Alouettes, he appeared in three games and recorded four tackles. He then returned to the Arena Football League (AFL) for the 2001 season joining the Los Angeles Avengers. For the season, he recorded two tackles. For the 2002 season, he recorded one tackle, one sack, and one pass break-up. In 2003, he recorded 12 tackles, one sack, and three pass break-ups. In 2004, he joined the Las Vegas Gladiators. For the season, he recorded nine tackles, 0.5 sacks, and one pass break-up.

== Coaching career ==
After a failed try out with the San Francisco 49ers, DeWitt returned to his alma mater Southside High School to help coach the football team.

== Post-football career ==
DeWitt graduated from Southern California University of Health Sciences and became a board certified chiropractor at Bergman Family Chiropractic.
