= Bob Kronenberg =

American football coach

New England Patriots
- Title: Pro scout

Personal information
- Born: March 11, 1971 (age 55); Menomonee Falls, Wisconsin, U.S.
- Listed height: 6 ft 2 in (1.88 m)
- Listed weight: 290 lb (132 kg)

Career information
- High school: Menomonee Falls
- College: St. Cloud State
- NFL draft: 1994: undrafted

Career history

Playing
- Las Vegas Posse (1994); Rhein Fire (1995); Toronto Argonauts (1995); Rhein Fire (1996–1998); Nashville Kats (1999–2000)

Coaching
- Georgia Force (2003–2008) Defensive coordinator; Georgia Force (2004) Interim head coach; Atlanta Falcons (2019–2020) Assistant offensive line coach

Operations
- Atlanta Falcons (2012–2018) Pro scout; New England Patriots (2024–present) Pro scout

Awards and highlights
- All-World League (1997); All-NFL Europe (1998); World Bowl champion (VI)
- Stats at ArenaFan.com

Robert Kronenberg (born March 11, 1971) is an American football scout and former player and coach who is a pro scout for the New England Patriots of the National Football League (NFL). Kronenberg played in the Canadian Football League, NFL Europe and the Arena Football League. Kronenberg was the defensive coordinator of the Georgia Force of the Arena Football League from 2003 to 2008 and was interim head coach in 2004. In 2011, he joined the Atlanta Falcons as a pro scout. From 2019 to 2020, he was the assistant offensive line coach for the Falcons. In 2024, he joined the Patriots as a pro scout.
