= Arnold Ale =

American football player (born 1970)

No. 56, 57
- Position: Linebacker

Personal information
- Born: June 17, 1970 (age 56); Los Angeles, California, U.S.
- Listed height: 6 ft 2 in (1.88 m)
- Listed weight: 230 lb (104 kg)

Career information
- High school: Carson (Carson, California)
- College: Notre Dame (1988); UCLA (1989–1992)
- NFL draft: 1993: undrafted

Career history
- New England Patriots (1993)*; Seattle Seahawks (1993)*; Kansas City Chiefs (1994); Scottish Claymores (1996); Denver Broncos (1996)*; San Diego Chargers (1996); Denver Broncos (1997)*
- * Offseason or practice squad member only

Awards and highlights
- Second-team All-Pac-10 (1991)
- Stats at Pro Football Reference

Arnold Tauese Ale (born June 17, 1970) is an American former professional football player who was a linebacker in the National Football League (NFL). He played college football for the Notre Dame and UCLA Bruins. He played in the NFL for the Kansas City Chiefs in 1994 and San Diego Chargers in 1996.
