= Garry Howe =

American football player (born 1968)

No. 64, 71, 72, 75, 78
- Positions: Defensive tackle, fullback

Personal information
- Born: June 20, 1968 (age 58); Spencer, Iowa, U.S.
- Listed height: 6 ft 1 in (1.85 m)
- Listed weight: 298 lb (135 kg)

Career information
- College: Drake; Colorado
- NFL draft: 1991: undrafted

Career history
- Pittsburgh Steelers (1991)*; Frankfurt Galaxy (1992); Pittsburgh Steelers (1992); Cincinnati Bengals (1993); Indianapolis Colts (1994); Amsterdam Admirals (1995); Iowa Barnstormers (1995); Amsterdam Admirals (1996); Iowa Barnstormers (1996–1997); Amsterdam Admirals (1997); Iowa Barnstormers (1998–2000)
- * Offseason or practice squad member only

Awards and highlights
- National champion (1990); First-team All-Big Eight (1990)

Career NFL statistics
- Tackles: 25
- Sacks: 2
- Stats at Pro Football Reference

Career AFL statistics
- Tackles: 38
- Sacks: 4
- Passes defended: 2
- Fumble recoveries: 2
- Stats at ArenaFan.com

Garry William Howe Jr. (born June 20, 1968) is an American former professional football player who was a defensive lineman in the National Football League (NFL) and the World League of American Football (WLAF). He played for the Pittsburgh Steelers, Cincinnati Bengals and Indianapolis Colts of the NFL, and the Frankfurt Galaxy and Amsterdam Admirals of the WLAF. He also played fullback for the Iowa Barnstormers as well as defensive lineman from 1995 to 2000. Howe played collegiately at Drake University and the University of Colorado.
