= Will Furrer =

American football player (born 1968)

No. 2, 7, 9, 10, 17
- Position: Quarterback

Personal information
- Born: February 5, 1968 (age 58); Danville, Pennsylvania, U.S.
- Listed height: 6 ft 3 in (1.91 m)
- Listed weight: 210 lb (95 kg)

Career information
- High school: Pullman (Pullman, Washington)
- College: Virginia Tech
- NFL draft: 1992: 4th round, 107th overall pick

Career history
- Chicago Bears (1992); Phoenix Cardinals (1993); Denver Broncos (1994); Amsterdam Admirals (1995); Houston Oilers (1995); Amsterdam Admirals (1996); St. Louis Rams (1997); Jacksonville Jaguars (1998)

Awards and highlights
- All-World League (1996); Second-team All-Big East (1991)

Career NFL statistics
- Passing attempts: 124
- Passing completions: 57
- Completion percentage: 46.0%
- TD–INT: 2–10
- Passing yards: 572
- Passer rating: 31.4
- Stats at Pro Football Reference

William Mason Furrer (born February 5, 1968) is an American former professional football player who was a quarterback in the National Football League (NFL) for the Chicago Bears, Phoenix Cardinals, Denver Broncos, Houston Oilers, St. Louis Rams, and Jacksonville Jaguars. He played college football for the Virginia Tech Hokies.

== Early life ==
Furrer attended Pullman High School, on the Palouse in southeastern Washington, and graduated in 1986. A baseball player, he did not play organized football until his sophomore year, and was the quarterback on the junior varsity. The next year he was a backup to senior Timm Rosenbach, another future NFL quarterback, and became the starter for the Greyhounds as a senior in the fall of 1985.

After his time at Pullman High School, Furrer attended Fork Union Military Academy.

== College career ==
As a quarterback with Virginia Tech, Furrer became one of the top quarterbacks in school history. He is currently ranked third on its list of all-time career passing leaders. Finishing with a career record of 16–18–1 (.471), Furrer was, as of 2013, the last full-time starting quarterback to have a losing record for Virginia Tech. However, his accomplishments at the university led to his induction into its sports hall of fame in 2015.

Furrer was one of only eight people to be named a national recipient of the National Football Foundation and College Hall of Fame Scholar Athlete Award in 1991, his senior year.

== Professional career ==
Furrer was selected by the Chicago Bears in the fourth round of the 1992 NFL draft, the fifth quarterback taken and 107th overall pick. He said, "One of my biggest problems will be trying to figure out whether to call Mike Singletary mister or sir."

== Career statistics ==
=== College ===
Year	Comp	Att	Pct	Yds	Td
1988	128	279	45.9	1384	6
1989	45	88	51.1	589	3
1990	173	293	58.4	2122	19
1991	148	257	57.6	1820	15
Career	Comp	Att	Pct	Yds	TD
4 Years	494	920	53.7	5915	43

=== NFL Europa ===
Year	Team	Comp	Att	Pct	Yds	YPA	Long	Td	Int	Rate	RYds	RAvg	RTd
1995	Amsterdam	51	85	60.0	542	6.38	38	4	2	84.5	32	2.3	1
1996	Amsterdam	206	369	56.0	2689	7.31	48	20	13	82.6	189	7.3	1
Career		Comp	Att	Pct	Yds	YPA	Long	TD	Int	Rate	RYds	RAvg	RTds
2 Years		257	454	58.0	3231	6.85	48	24	15	83.6	224	4.8	2

=== NFL ===
Year	Team	G	Comp	Att	Pct	Yds	YPA	Long	Td	Int	Rate	RYds	RAvg	RTd
1992	Chicago	2	9	25	36.0	89	3.6	16	0	3	7.3	0	0	0
1995	Houston	7	48	99	48.5	483	4.9	48	2	7	40.1	20	2.5	0
Career		G	Comp	Att	Pct	Yds	YPA	Long	TD	Int	Rate	RYds	RAvg	RTds
2 Years		9	57	124	42.3	572	4.3	48	2	10	23.7	20	2.5	0

== Career highlights ==
- 2015 Virginia Tech Sports Hall of Fame
- 2006, inducted into the Fork Union Military Academy Hall of Fame
- 1987, Pullman High School (Washington): All-league Honors
- 1991, National Recipient of the National Football Foundation and College Hall of Fame Scholar Athlete Award
- 1991, one of seven finalists for the Johnny Unitas Golden Arm Award
- 1991, All-Big East Conference Second-team Selection
- All-World League (1996)

Records

- Virginia Tech: Most Pass Completions – 494
- Amsterdam Admirals: Most Passes Attempted in a Season – 368 in 1996

== After football ==
Furrer was a partner with Tony Boselli and Jeff Novak in IF Marketing & Advertising with offices in Georgetown, Texas and Jacksonville, Florida. Prior to founding IF marketing & advertising, he was director of Web Technologies for S1 Corporation. He also held numerous roles, including chief strategy officer, at Q2, a company that provides digital banking and lending solutions to banks, credit unions, alternative finance, and fintech companies in the U.S. and internationally.

Furrer is a member of the Virginia Tech Hall of Fame and Fork Union Military Academy Hall of Fame. He currently sits on the board for Virginia Tech's Apex Center for Entrepreneurship.

He holds a Bachelor of Arts degree in English from Virginia Tech, and has served the university in the past in roles on the Alumni Association Board of Directors and Distinguished Alumni Board for English.
