= Andre Allen (defensive end) =

American gridiron football player (born 1973)

Profile
- Position: Defensive end

Personal information
- Born: June 24, 1973 (age 53); Itta Bena, Mississippi, U.S.
- Listed height: 6 ft 3 in (1.91 m)
- Listed weight: 245 lb (111 kg)

Career information
- College: Northern Iowa

Career history
- 1995: Philadelphia Eagles*
- 1995: Winnipeg Blue Bombers
- 1996: London Monarchs
- 1997: Iowa Barnstormers
- 1998: Nashville Kats
- * Offseason or practice squad member only

Andre Allen (born June 30, 1973) is an American former professional football defensive end who played one game for the Winnipeg Blue Bombers of the Canadian Football League in 1995, recording a single tackle. He played college football for the Northern Iowa Panthers.
