= Karmeeleyah McGill =

American football player (born 1971)

No. 59, 90, 52
- Position: Linebacker

Personal information
- Born: January 11, 1971 (age 55); Clearwater, Florida, U.S.
- Listed height: 6 ft 3 in (1.91 m)
- Listed weight: 224 lb (102 kg)

Career information
- High school: Dunedin
- College: Notre Dame
- NFL draft: 1993: undrafted

Career history
- Cincinnati Bengals (1993); Tampa Bay Buccaneers (1995)*; Amsterdam Admirals (1995–1996); Scottish Claymores (1996)
- * Offseason or practice squad member only
- Stats at Pro Football Reference

Karmeeleyah McGill (born January 11, 1971) is an American former professional football player who was a linebacker for the Cincinnati Bengals of the National Football League (NFL). He played college football for the Notre Dame Fighting Irish.
