= Bobby Hamilton (American football) =

American football player (born 1971)

No. 92, 91, 98, 96
- Positions: Defensive end, defensive tackle

Personal information
- Born: July 1, 1971 (age 55); Columbia, Mississippi, U.S.
- Listed height: 6 ft 5 in (1.96 m)
- Listed weight: 285 lb (129 kg)

Career information
- College: Southern Miss
- NFL draft: 1994: undrafted

Career history
- Seattle Seahawks (1994); Amsterdam Admirals (1995-1996); New York Jets (1996–1999); New England Patriots (2000–2003); Oakland Raiders (2004–2005); New York Jets (2006); Cleveland Browns (2007)

Awards and highlights
- 2× Super Bowl champion (XXXVI, XXXVIII); First Team All-IFA (1993); Second team All-IFA(1992)

Career NFL statistics
- Tackles: 479
- Sacks: 19
- Forced fumbles: 2
- Fumble recoveries: 6
- Interceptions: 1
- Stats at Pro Football Reference

Bobby Hamilton (born July 1, 1971) is an American former professional football player who was a defensive end in the National Football League (NFL). He played college football for the Southern Miss Golden Eagles. Hamilton was signed by the Seattle Seahawks as an undrafted free agent in 1994.

== Early life ==
Hamilton attended East Marion High School in Columbia, Mississippi and was a student and a letterman in football, basketball, baseball, and track. Bobby Hamilton graduated from East Marion High School in 1989.

== College career ==
Hamilton attended the University of Southern Mississippi and was a student and a football standout. In football, he was a four-year letterman and a two-year starter, and finished his impressive college football career with 18 sacks and 173 tackles (18 for losses).

== NFL career statistics ==
Legend
| | Won the Super Bowl |
| **Bold** | Career high |

=== Regular season ===
| Year | Team | Games | | Tackles | | | | Interceptions | | | | Fumbles | | | |
| Year | Team | GP | GS | Comb | Solo | Ast | Sck | Int | Yds | TD | Lng | FF | FR | Yds | TD |
|---|---|---|---|---|---|---|---|---|---|---|---|---|---|---|---|
| 1996 | NYJ | 15 | 11 | 49 | 32 | 17 | 4.5 | 0 | 0 | 0 | 0 | **1** | 1 | 7 | 0 |
| 1997 | NYJ | 16 | 0 | 24 | 13 | 11 | 1.0 | 0 | 0 | 0 | 0 | 0 | 0 | 0 | 0 |
| 1998 | NYJ | 16 | 1 | 21 | 13 | 8 | 0.0 | 0 | 0 | 0 | 0 | 0 | 0 | 0 | 0 |
| 1999 | NYJ | 7 | 0 | 9 | 8 | 1 | 0.0 | 0 | 0 | 0 | 0 | 0 | 0 | 0 | 0 |
| 2000 | NWE | 16 | 16 | **79** | 41 | **38** | 1.5 | 0 | 0 | 0 | 0 | 0 | 1 | 0 | 0 |
| 2001 | NWE | 16 | 15 | 52 | 31 | 21 | **7.0** | 0 | 0 | 0 | 0 | 0 | 1 | 0 | 0 |
| 2002 | NWE | 16 | 15 | 55 | 34 | 21 | 2.0 | **1** | 0 | 0 | 0 | 0 | 0 | 0 | 0 |
| 2003 | NWE | 16 | 16 | 46 | 30 | 16 | 0.0 | 0 | 0 | 0 | 0 | 0 | 0 | 0 | 0 |
| 2004 | OAK | 16 | 15 | 57 | 34 | 23 | 1.0 | 0 | 0 | 0 | 0 | 0 | 0 | 0 | 0 |
| 2005 | OAK | 14 | 13 | 56 | **50** | 6 | 2.0 | 0 | 0 | 0 | 0 | **1** | **2** | **8** | 0 |
| 2006 | NYJ | 16 | 1 | 30 | 19 | 11 | 0.0 | 0 | 0 | 0 | 0 | 0 | 1 | 0 | 0 |
| 2007 | CLE | 1 | 1 | 1 | 1 | 0 | 0.0 | 0 | 0 | 0 | 0 | 0 | 0 | 0 | 0 |
| | | 165 | 104 | 479 | 306 | 173 | 19.0 | 1 | 0 | 0 | 0 | 2 | 6 | 15 | 0 |

=== Playoffs ===
| Year | Team | Games | | Tackles | | | | Interceptions | | | | Fumbles | | | |
| Year | Team | GP | GS | Comb | Solo | Ast | Sck | Int | Yds | TD | Lng | FF | FR | Yds | TD |
|---|---|---|---|---|---|---|---|---|---|---|---|---|---|---|---|
| 1998 | NYJ | 2 | 0 | 3 | 1 | 2 | 0.0 | 0 | 0 | 0 | 0 | 0 | 0 | 0 | 0 |
| 2001 | NWE | 3 | 3 | 9 | 1 | **8** | **1.0** | 0 | 0 | 0 | 0 | 0 | 0 | 0 | 0 |
| 2003 | NWE | 3 | 3 | **10** | **5** | 5 | 0.0 | 0 | 0 | 0 | 0 | 0 | 0 | 0 | 0 |
| 2006 | NYJ | 1 | 0 | 3 | 1 | 2 | 0.0 | 0 | 0 | 0 | 0 | 0 | 0 | 0 | 0 |
| | | 9 | 6 | 25 | 8 | 17 | 1.0 | 0 | 0 | 0 | 0 | 0 | 0 | 0 | 0 |
