= A. J. Jenkins (linebacker) =

American football player (born 1966)

No. 99, 63
- Positions: Linebacker, defensive end

Personal information
- Born: April 12, 1966 (age 60); Havelock, North Carolina, U.S.
- Listed height: 6 ft 2 in (1.88 m)
- Listed weight: 237 lb (108 kg)

Career information
- High school: Havelock
- College: Cal State Fullerton
- NFL draft: 1989: 9th round, 228th overall pick

Career history
- Pittsburgh Steelers (1989–1990); Los Angeles Rams (1992)*; Amsterdam Admirals (1995)*; London Monarchs (1995–1996); Anaheim Piranhas (1997); New Jersey Red Dogs (1998)
- * Offseason or practice squad member only
- Stats at Pro Football Reference
- Stats at ArenaFan.com

A. J. Jenkins (born April 12, 1966) is an American former professional football player for the Pittsburgh Steelers of the National Football League (NFL). He played college football for the Cal State Fullerton Titans and was selected by the Steelers in the ninth round of the 1989 NFL draft.

== Early life ==
A. J. Jenkins was born on April 12, 1966, in Havelock, North Carolina. He attended Havelock High School.

== College career ==
Jenkins played junior college football at Merced College from 1985 to 1986. He transferred to California State University, Fullerton, where he played college football for the Cal State Fullerton Titans from 1987 to 1988. He had 12.5 sacks during his time at Cal State Fullerton.

== Professional career ==
Jenkins was selected by the Pittsburgh Steelers in the ninth round, with the 228th overall pick, of the 1989 NFL draft. He signed with the team on July 19. He played in all 16 games as a reserve linebacker during the 1989 season. Jenkins also appeared in one playoff game. He was placed on injured reserve on January 5, 1990. Jenkins was placed on injured reserve again on October 5 and was activated on December 28. He played in five games overall as a backup linebacker/defensive end in 1990 and posted two sacks. He became a free agent after the 1990 season and re-signed with Pittsburgh. However, he was later released by the Steelers on August 20, 1991, after the third of four preseason games.

Jenkins sighed with the Los Angeles Rams on May 1, 1992. He was released on August 24, 1992, after the third game of the 1992 preseason.

In February 1995, Jenkins was selected by the Amsterdam Admirals of the World League of American Football (WLAF) during the 1995 WLAF draft. However, he never played for the Admirals, instead playing the 1995 WLAF season with the London Monarchs. He posted four sacks as a defensive end for the Monarchs in 1995. Jenkins played for London again in 1996, recording three tackles on defense, one special teams tackle, and one sack.

Jenkins played in four games for the Anaheim Piranhas of the Arena Football League (AFL) in 1997, posting two solo tackles, two assisted tackles, and two fumble recoveries. He was an offensive lineman/defensive lineman during his time in the AFL as the league played under ironman rules. The Piranhas folded after the 1997 season. In December 1997, Jenkins was selected by the New Jersey Red Dogs in the 1997 AFL dispersal draft. He appeared in ten games for the Red Dogs in 1998, totaling three solo tackles and four assisted tackles.
