= Melvin Aldridge =

American gridiron football player (born 1970)

Profile
- Positions: Linebacker, Defensive back

Personal information
- Born: July 22, 1970 (age 56); Mount Pleasant, Texas, U.S.
- Listed height: 6 ft 2 in (1.88 m)
- Listed weight: 195 lb (88 kg)

Career information
- High school: Pittsburg (Pittsburg, Texas)
- Junior college: Tyler Junior College
- College: Murray State

Career history
- 1993: Houston Oilers
- 1995: Amsterdam Admirals
- 1995: Arizona Cardinals
- 1996: London Monarchs
- 1996: Ottawa Rough Riders
- 1997: Hamilton Tiger-Cats
- Stats at Pro Football Reference

Melvin Keith Aldridge (born July 22, 1970) is a former gridiron football linebacker and defensive back who played in the National Football League, the Canadian Football League, and the World League of American Football. He played college football at Tyler Junior College and for the Murray State Racers. After playing in one game for the Houston Oilers and two games for the Arizona Cardinals, Aldridge played in the CFL. He made 45 tackles in 11 games for the Ottawa Rough Riders and the Hamilton Tiger-Cats.
