= Jerry Drake (American football) =

American football player (born 1969)

No. 76
- Position: Defensive end/Defensive tackle

Personal information
- Born: July 9, 1969 (age 57); Kingston, New York, U.S.
- Listed height: 6 ft 5 in (1.96 m)
- Listed weight: 310 lb (141 kg)

Career information
- College: Ulster County CC; Hastings
- NFL draft: 1995: undrafted

Career history
- Arizona Cardinals (1995–2000); → London Monarchs (1996)

Awards and highlights
- WLAF sacks leader (1996)

Career NFL statistics
- Tackles: 55
- Sacks: 1
- Interceptions: 1
- Stats at Pro Football Reference
- College Football Hall of Fame

Jerry Drake (born July 9, 1969) is an American former professional football player who was a defensive lineman who spent six seasons with the Arizona Cardinals. He played college football for the Hastings Broncos.

Children Janel Drake Kelsei Drake Jerry Drake Jr

== College career ==
A native of Kingston, New York, Drake played one year of college football at Ulster County Community College before the program was disbanded. He transferred to Hastings College, a National Association of Intercollegiate Athletics (NAIA) Division II program, because he had some friends who attended the school. As a junior, Drake recorded 48 tackles, nine tackles for loss, 11 sacks, two fumble recoveries, one blocked kick, and seven pass breakups. As a senior, he recorded 32 solo tackles, two sacks, three interceptions, and three pass breakups. He was twice selected as a NAIA All-American. Drake also played in the semi-professional Empire Football League.

== Professional career ==
Drake signed with the Cardinals as an undrafted free agent in April 1995. He was waived in August and re-signed to the team's practice squad. Drake was promoted to the active roster in late November. He made his NFL debut on December 9 in a nationally televised game against the San Diego Chargers, recording a memorably "jarring" tackle of Andre Coleman on a kick return. Drake played in two games as a rookie.

Drake was allocated to the London Monarchs of the World League of American Football (WLAF) in February 1996. He finished the 1996 WLAF season with a league-leading eight sacks. Drake re-joined the Cardinals for the 1996 season and recorded 14 tackles, mostly on special teams, in 11 games played.

In June 1997, Drake signed a three-year, $1.025 million extension with the Cardinals. However, after losing strength in the left side of his body, he was diagnosed with spinal cord compression and underwent a season-ending surgery on August 26, 1997. Drake was cleared for activity in April 1998. He earned the starting spot at defensive left end ahead of the 1998 season opener against the Dallas Cowboys, following an injury to Brad Ottis and a contract holdout by first-round draft pick Andre Wadsworth. However, Drake developed a herniated disc in his back during the game and was forced to undergo surgery again, once again ending his season.

After his release from prison in July 1999, Drake joined the Cardinals' training camp. In the 1999 season opener against the Philadelphia Eagles, he sacked Doug Pederson and recovered a fumble. However, Drake cracked a bone in his right thumb. In week three against the San Francisco 49ers, he intercepted a tipped pass from Steve Young. Drake started all 16 games and recorded 98 tackles. He signed a one-year extension in May 2000. Drake suffered a sprained right knee in a preseason loss to the Minnesota Vikings and was subsequently placed on the injured reserve list. He was released in early November after reaching an injury settlement.

== Personal life ==
Drake got married shortly after the conclusion of the 1996 season. He was arrested twice in late 1997 and was charged with an aggravated Driving under the influence (DUI) felony in each instance. After pleading no contest to both charges, Drake was sentenced to concurrent prison terms of four and six months. His second child, a son, was born during his time in prison, and he was released in July 1999.
