= Joe O'Brien (American football) =

American football player and coach (born 1972)

Personal information
- Born: November 6, 1972 (age 54); Pittsburg, California, U.S.
- Listed height: 6 ft 2 in (1.88 m)
- Listed weight: 275 lb (125 kg)

Career information
- High school: Pittsburg (CA)
- College: Boise State (1991–1994)
- NFL draft: 1995: undrafted

Career history

Playing
- Minnesota Vikings (1995)*; San Jose SaberCats (1996); Scottish Claymores (1996); New Orleans Saints (1997)*; San Jose SaberCats (1998)
- * Offseason or practice squad member only

Coaching
- Boise State (1995) Defensive line coach; Montana State (2000–2001) Defensive line coach; Montana State (2002) Assistant head coach & defensive line coach; Central Valley Coyotes (2010) Defensive line coach; Wenatchee Valley Venom (2011) Assistant head coach & defensive coordinator; Simms HS (MT) (2012) Head coach; Southern Oregon (2020–2021) Defensive consultant; Montana State–Northern (2022–2023) Associate head coach & defensive coordinator

Awards and highlights
- 1994 Big Sky Conf. Defensive Player of the Year; 1996 World Bowl Champion (WLAF)

Joe O'Brien (born November 6, 1972) is an American football coach and former lineman. He also played in the WLAF, AFL, and the NFL from 1995 to 1998. He later went on to coach at the collegiate level.

== College career ==
O'Brien played college football at Boise State University in Idaho from 1991 to 1994. He lettered in his final two years and in 1994 was named Big Sky Conference defensive player of the year.

== Professional career ==
Joe O'Brien was signed to a two-year contract as an undrafted rookie free agent by the Minnesota Vikings after the 1995 NFL draft but was cut before the 1995 regular season began. He was then signed by the San Jose Sabercats of the Arena Football League in 1996. He played only 2 games for San Jose before being chosen in the 19th round of the World League of American Football draft by the Scottish Claymores, where he played 10 games, starting 6 of them. The Claymores defeated the Frankfort Galaxy on June 23, 1996, to become the 1996 World Bowl champions. The following year, he was signed as a free agent by the New Orleans Saints during the offseason but again was cut before the 1997 regular season began. In 1998, he returned to the AFL and the San Jose Sabrecats, playing 11 games on both the offensive and defensive lines.
