= Southern California University of Health Sciences =

Private university in Whittier, California

Coordinates: 33.9244°N 117.9842°W

- Type: Private university
- Established: 1911
- Founders: Charles Cale and Linnie Cale
- Accreditation: WASC Senior College and University Commission (WSCUC)
- President: John Scaringe
- Provost: Tamara Rozhon
- Location: Whittier, California, United States
- Campus: Urban
- Colors: Blue and white
- Website: www.scuhs.edu

Southern California University of Health Sciences (SCU) is a private university in Whittier, California, and Tempe, Arizona that offers programs in chiropractic, acupuncture and other pseudoscientific and non-mainstream approaches to healthcare. Academics are organized into three schools: the Los Angeles College of Chiropractic, the College of Eastern Medicine, and the College of Science & Integrative Health.

Southern California University of Health Sciences is institutionally accredited by the WASC Senior College and University Commission (WSCUC). Several of its professional healthcare programs also hold specialized accreditation from their respective accrediting bodies.

== History ==
Originally a chiropractic school, SCU began as Los Angeles College of Chiropractic (LACC) at its founding on October 18, 1911, by Charles Cale and his wife, Linnie Cale. The first graduating class had only three students, and classes were taught in the Cales' private residence. By 1912, the school had moved to an opera house in Los Angeles and had grown to 113 students.

In 1922, the Chiropractic Initiative Act of 1922 passed, allowing the state to create a board of chiropractic examiners. This act served as a catalyst for the creation of many other chiropractic institutions in California, most of which LACC would acquire within the next three decades.

In the 1940s, the California Chiropractic Educational Foundation acquired several remaining colleges in California, including LACC. They reorganized the colleges, keeping the name Los Angeles College of Chiropractic, and moved the school's location to Glendale, California, in 1950. In 1971, the campus received a $3 million renovation following damage sustained in the 1971 San Fernando earthquake.

In 1981, the college moved to its current location in Whittier, California, after purchasing a new 38-acre campus on the former site of Lowell High School.

LACC was first accredited in 1993 by the Western Association of Schools and Colleges. It was the only chiropractic college accredited by the WASC as of 2013.

From 1999 to 2000, LACC added a College of Acupuncture and Oriental Medicine and reorganized itself into the Southern California University of Health Sciences to house both programs.

As of 2020, the university continued to grow, adding a Master of Science in Medical Science program, as well as a Master of Acupuncture and Chinese Medicine and Ayurvedic practitioner certificate, which are forms of traditional medicine that are largely rejected by mainstream medical and scientific communities. In addition, the university was restructured to include LACC, an accelerated sciences division, a physician assistant program, and a health science program.

== Academics ==
Southern California University of Health Sciences operates on a trimester system and emphasizes integrative, holistic healthcare, blending conventional biomedical science with complementary and alternative medicine. The university offers eight doctoral degree programs across multiple health disciplines. The Doctor of Chiropractic degree program is accredited by the Commission on Accreditation of the Council on Chiropractic Education (CCE) and the California Board of Chiropractic Examiners.

Southern California University of Health Sciences incorporates Whole Health as a philosophy and aligns with the Whole Health approach taken by the United States Department of Veterans Affairs. SCU applies these principles across its health sciences and leadership programs to prepare graduates for integrative and holistic healthcare practice.

Other doctoral programs include the Doctor of Acupuncture and Chinese Herbal Medicine, Doctor of Physical Therapy, Doctor of Occupational Therapy (offered at both California and Phoenix campuses), Doctor of Whole Health Leadership, and Doctor of Medical Science (a physician assistantship degree).

=== Undergraduate program ===
The university's College of Science and Integrative Health offers a Bachelor of Science in Health Sciences, providing a comprehensive undergraduate science curriculum.

=== Master's programs ===
SCU offers five master's degree programs: Master of Acupuncture and Chinese Herbal Medicine, both of which are regarded by the mainstream medicine and science communities as pseudoscience; Master of Science in Medical Science; Master of Science in Genetic Counseling; Master of Science in Human Genetics & Genomics; and Master of Science: Physician Assistant.

The College of Acupuncture and Traditional Chinese Medicine is a nine-trimester program accredited by the Accreditation Commission for Acupuncture and Herbal Medicine (ACAHM), the recognized accrediting agency for the approval acupuncture and oriental medicine programs. It is also approved by the California Acupuncture Board.

=== Doctoral programs ===
SCU offers several doctoral degree programs: the Doctor of Chiropractic, Doctor of Physical Therapy, Doctor of Occupational Therapy, Doctor of Psychology in Psychodynamic Psychology, Doctor of Whole Health Leadership, and Doctor of Medical Science, a terminal credential for practicing physician's assistants.

=== Certificates and online courses ===
SCUHS is also home to two Ayurveda certificate programs: a wellness educator program and an Ayurvedic practitioner program. The Ayurvedic practitioner program is supported by the California Association of Ayurvedic Medicine and the National Ayurvedic Medical Association. Currently, there are no official licenses in the United States to practice Ayurveda.

Additional certificate and continuing education offerings include graduate certificates in human genetics & genomics, pre-genetic counseling, and health education, as well as accelerated science courses and specialized short courses in Ayurveda.

== Location ==
SCU is located in the suburbs of East Whittier, 20 miles southeast of Los Angeles. East Whittier borders Orange County and Los Angeles County border lines. SCUHS' Arizona campus is located in Tempe, AZ.

== Notable alumni ==
- John DeWitt – Chiropractor and Professional Football Player
- Jonathan Leary – Businessman
- Jimmy Kim – Olympic Gold Medalist in Taekwondo
