= 1996 Barcelona Dragons season =

World League of American Football team season

- General manager: Jordi Vila-Puig
- Head coach: Jack Bicknell
- Home stadium: Estadi Olímpic de Montjuïc

Results
- Record: 5–5
- Division place: 4th
- Playoffs: Did not qualify

The 1996 Barcelona Dragons season was the fourth season for the franchise in the World League of American Football (WLAF). The team was led by head coach Jack Bicknell in his fourth year, and played its home games at Estadi Olímpic de Montjuïc in Barcelona, Catalonia, Spain. They finished the regular season in fourth place with a record of five wins and five losses.

== Offseason ==
=== World League draft ===
1996 Barcelona Dragons World League draft selections
Draft order		Player name	Position	College
Round	Choice	Player name	Position	College
1	4	Rick Hamilton	LB	Central Florida
2	10	Mitch Donahue	DE	Wyoming
3	15	Matthew Werner	DT	UCLA
4	22	Bob Meeks	C	Auburn
5	27	Fritz Fequire	G	Iowa
6	34	Orlando Parker	WR	Troy State
7	39	Ronald Edwards	T	North Carolina A&T
8	46	Kenny Shedd	WR	Northern Iowa
9	51	Brian Bravy	G	Georgia Tech
10	58	Eric Naposki	LB	Connecticut
11	63	Darren Krein	DE	Miami (FL)
12	70	Ricky Blake	RB	Alabama A&M
13	77	Joe Garten	C	Colorado
14	84	Corey Dixon	WR	Nebraska
15	89	Royce Nelson	G	Nicholls State
16	96	Eric Lindstrom	LB	Boston College
17	101	Adrian Jones	DB	Missouri
18	108	Craig Thompson	TE	North Carolina A&T
19	113	Avrom Smith	RB	New Hampshire
20	119	Demetrius Edwards	DT	Fresno State
21	124	Doug Thomas	WR	Clemson
22	129	John Roberts	QB	Northern Colorado

== Personnel ==
=== Staff ===
1996 Barcelona Dragons (NFL Europe) staff
Front office: General Manager – Jordi Vila-Puig; Deputy General Manager – Marco Fusté; Head coaches: Head Coach – Jack Bicknell; Offensive coaches: Offensive Coordinator/Quarterbacks/Wide Receivers – Dick Curl; Offensive Line – Vince Martino	Defensive coaches: Defensive Coordinator/Linebackers – Red Kelin; Defensive Line – Sam Clancy; Defensive Backs – Chip Beake; National Coach – Juan Jiménez

=== Roster ===
1996 Barcelona Dragons final roster
Quarterbacks: 10 Kelly Holcomb; 13 John Roberts; 19 Tony Sacca; Running backs: 24 Charles Thompson; 26 Terry Wilburn; Wide receivers: 80 Alfonzo Browning; 85 Jeremy Burkett; 1 Marvin Marshall; Tight ends: 89 Bryce Burnett; 88 Demetrius Davis	Offensive linemen: 79 Louis Age T; 76 Chuck Bradley T; 77 Ron Edwards T; 67 Fritz Fequiere G; 55 Joe Garten G/C; 63 Bob Meeks C; 62 Tom Robsock G; Defensive linemen: 93 Demetrius Edwards DT; 56 Darren Krein DE; 94 Vin Stewart DT; 98 Ricky Sutton DT; 92 Josh Taves DE	Linebackers: 52 Ken Alexander MLB; 53 Rick Hamilton MLB; 95 Eric Naposki OLB; 91 Kevin O'Brien OLB; 51 Tommy Thigpen OLB; Defensive backs: 25 Chris Crooms S; 29 Kenny Gales CB; 22 Mike Middleton S; 45 Rodney Thomas CB; 21 Tim Watson S; 20 Mike Wright CB; Special teams: 14 Shayne Edge P; 6 Scott Szeredy K	National players: 83 (Finland) Sami Alalampi WR; 42 (France) Ousmane Bary CB; 31 (Spain) Pau Coll S; 34 (Spain) Cacho Conde RB; 74 (Germany) Vladimir Ilic DE; 66 (Spain) Ivan Imbernon DE; 30 (Spain) Pedro Garau RB; 58 (Mexico) Diego Martos OLB; Rookies in italics

== Schedule ==
Week	Date	Kickoff (Note: All times local to where the game was played.)	Opponent	Results		Game site	Attendance
Week	Date	Kickoff	Opponent	Final score	Team record	Game site	Attendance
1	Sunday, April 14	6:00 p.m.	Amsterdam Admirals	W 34–27 ^{OT}	1–0	Estadi Olímpic de Montjuïc	17,300
2	Sunday, April 21	3:00 p.m.	at Scottish Claymores	L 13–23	1–1	Murrayfield Stadium	12,928
3	Sunday, April 28	6:00 p.m.	Frankfurt Galaxy	L 29–33	1–2	Estadi Olímpic de Montjuïc	17,503
4	Monday, May 6	3:00 p.m.	at London Monarchs	W 9–7	2–2	White Hart Lane	13,627
5	Sunday, May 12	6:00 p.m.	Rhein Fire	W 21–19	3–2	Estadi Olímpic de Montjuïc	15,742
6	Saturday, May 18	6:30 p.m.	at Amsterdam Admirals	L 14–48	3–3	Olympisch Stadion	8,712
7	Saturday, May 25	7:00 p.m.	at Rhein Fire	L 12–16	3–4	Rheinstadion	13,173
8	Sunday, June 2	6:00 p.m.	London Monarchs	W 7–6	4–4	Estadi Olímpic de Montjuïc	9,875
9	Saturday, June 8	7:00 p.m.	at Frankfurt Galaxy	L 21–24	4–5	Waldstadion	33,115
10	Sunday, June 16	6:00 p.m.	Scottish Claymores	W 32–27	5–5	Estadi Olímpic de Montjuïc	16,124

== Standings ==
World League of American Football
Team	W	L	T	PCT	PF	PA	Home	Road	STK
Scottish Claymores	7	3	0	.700	233	190	5–0	2–3	L1
Frankfurt Galaxy	6	4	0	.600	221	220	3–2	3–2	W2
Amsterdam Admirals	5	5	0	.500	250	210	4–1	1–4	L1
Barcelona Dragons	5	5	0	.500	192	230	4–1	1–4	W1
London Monarchs	4	6	0	.400	161	192	3–2	1–4	W1
Rhein Fire	3	7	0	.300	176	191	2–3	1–4	L2

== Game summaries ==
=== Week 1: vs Amsterdam Admirals ===
Week One: Amsterdam Admirals at Barcelona Dragons – Game summary

Quarter	1	2	3	4	OT	Total
Amsterdam	14	7	0	6	0	27
Barcelona	7	7	7	6	7	34

at Estadi Olímpic de Montjuïc, Barcelona, Spain

- Date: Sunday, April 14
- Game time: 6:00 p.m. CEST
- Game attendance: 17,300

=== Week 2: at Scottish Claymores ===
Week Two: Barcelona Dragons at Scottish Claymores – Game summary

Quarter	1	2	Total
Barcelona			0
Scotland			0

at Murrayfield Stadium, Edinburgh, Scotland

- Date: Sunday, April 21
- Game time: 3:00 p.m. BST
- Game attendance: 12,928

=== Week 3: vs Frankfurt Galaxy ===
Week Three: Frankfurt Galaxy at Barcelona Dragons – Game summary

Quarter	1	2	3	4	Total
Frankfurt	7	3	7	16	33
Barcelona	6	3	0	20	29

at Estadi Olímpic de Montjuïc, Barcelona, Spain

- Date: Sunday, April 28
- Game time: 6:00 p.m. CEST
- Game attendance: 17,503

=== Week 4: at London Monarchs ===
Week Four: Barcelona Dragons at London Monarchs – Game summary

Quarter	1	2	Total
Barcelona			0
London			0

at White Hart Lane, London, England

- Date: Monday, May 6
- Game time: 3:00 p.m. BST
- Game attendance: 13,627

=== Week 5: vs Rhein Fire ===
Week Five: Rhein Fire at Barcelona Dragons – Game summary

Quarter	1	2	3	4	Total
Rhein	0	7	0	12	19
Barcelona	6	12	0	3	21

at Estadi Olímpic de Montjuïc, Barcelona, Spain

- Date: Sunday, May 12
- Game time: 6:00 p.m. CEST
- Game attendance: 15,742

=== Week 6: at Amsterdam Admirals ===
Week Six: Barcelona Dragons at Amsterdam Admirals – Game summary

Quarter	1	2	3	4	Total
Barcelona	0	7	7	0	14
Amsterdam	14	20	7	7	48

at Olympisch Stadion, Amsterdam, Netherlands

- Date: Saturday, May 18
- Game time: 6:30 p.m. CEST
- Game attendance: 8,712

=== Week 7: at Rhein Fire ===
Week Seven: Barcelona Dragons at Rhein Fire – Game summary

Quarter	1	2	3	4	Total
Barcelona	0	3	9	0	12
Rhein	6	7	0	3	16

at Rheinstadion, Düsseldorf, Germany

- Date: Saturday, May 25
- Game time: 7:00 p.m. CEST
- Game attendance: 13,173

=== Week 8: vs London Monarchs ===
Week Eight: London Monarchs at Barcelona Dragons – Game summary

Quarter	1	2	Total
London			0
Barcelona			0

at Estadi Olímpic de Montjuïc, Barcelona, Spain

- Date: Sunday, June 2
- Game time: 6:00 p.m. CEST
- Game attendance: 9,875

=== Week 9: at Frankfurt Galaxy ===
Week Nine: Barcelona Dragons at Frankfurt Galaxy – Game summary

Quarter	1	2	3	4	Total
Barcelona	14	0	0	7	21
Frankfurt	0	7	7	10	24

at Waldstadion, Frankfurt, Germany

- Date: Saturday, June 8
- Game time: 7:00 p.m. CEST
- Game attendance: 33,115

=== Week 10: vs Scottish Claymores ===
Week Ten: Scottish Claymores at Barcelona Dragons – Game summary

Quarter	1	2	Total
Scotland			0
Barcelona			0

at Estadi Olímpic de Montjuïc, Barcelona, Spain

- Date: Sunday, June 16
- Game time: 6:00 p.m. CEST
- Game attendance: 16,124
