= Dunstan Anderson =

American football player (1970–2004)

No. 71, 73, 93, 98, 58
- Position: Defensive end

Personal information
- Born: December 31, 1970; Fort Worth, Texas, U.S.
- Died: May 31, 2004 (aged 33); Fort Myers, Florida, U.S.
- Listed height: 6 ft 3 in (1.91 m)
- Listed weight: 260 lb (118 kg)

Career information
- High school: O. D. Wyatt (Fort Worth, Texas)
- College: Tulsa
- NFL draft: 1994: undrafted

Career history
- Kansas City Chiefs (1994)*; Atlanta Falcons (1994); New Orleans Saints (1995)*; Dallas Cowboys (1995)*; London Monarchs (1996); Rhein Fire (1996); Houston Oilers (1996)*; Winnipeg Blue Bombers (1996); Rhein Fire (1997); Miami Dolphins (1997); Chicago Bears (1999)*; Grand Rapids Rampage (2000–2001); Chicago Enforcers (2001); Carolina Cobras (2003); Florida Firecats (2004)
- * Offseason or practice squad member only

Awards and highlights
- ArenaBowl champion (2001)

Career NFL statistics
- Tackles: 5
- Fumble recoveries: 1
- Stats at Pro Football Reference

Dunstan Anderson (December 31, 1970 – May 31, 2004) was an American professional football defensive lineman in the National Football League (NFL) and the World League of American Football (WLAF). He played for the Atlanta Falcons and Miami Dolphins of the NFL, and the London Monarchs and Rhein Fire of the WLAF. Anderson played collegiately at the University of Tulsa. Anderson was the passenger of an SUV when he was killed in an automobile accident, which also left the driver of the SUV in critical condition.
