= Andre Allen (offensive lineman) =

American gridiron football player (born 1971)

Profile
- Position: Offensive lineman

Personal information
- Born: February 28, 1971 (age 55); Anniston, Alabama, U.S.
- Listed height: 6 ft 0 in (1.83 m)
- Listed weight: 320 lb (145 kg)

Career information
- High school: Oxford HS
- College: Jacksonville State

Career history
- 1994: Las Vegas Posse

Andre Allen (born February 28, 1971) is an American former professional football offensive lineman who played five games for the Las Vegas Posse of the Canadian Football League in 1994. He played college football for the Jacksonville State Gamecocks.
