= Blaine Berger =

American football player (born 1970)

No. 78, 92, 93
- Position: Defensive tackle

Personal information
- Born: December 28, 1970 (age 55); Idaho Falls, Idaho, U.S.
- Listed height: 6 ft 4 in (1.93 m)
- Listed weight: 305 lb (138 kg)

Career information
- High school: Idaho Falls (Idaho Falls, Idaho)
- College: Utah (1990-1993)
- NFL draft: 1994: undrafted

Career history
- San Diego Chargers (1994)*; Amsterdam Admirals (1995); London Monarchs (1996); Arizona Cardinals (1996); Portland Forest Dragons (1998); Las Vegas Outlaws (2001)
- * Offseason or practice squad member only

Career AFL statistics
- Total tackles: 7
- Stats at ArenaFan.com

Blaine Berger (born December 28, 1970) is an American former football defensive tackle. He played college football at Utah. He was signed as an undrafted free agent by the Amsterdam Admirals of the World League of American Football (later known as NFL Europe).

He also played for the London Monarchs, Arizona Cardinals of the National Football League (NFL), Portland Forest Dragons of the Arena Football League (AFL) and the Las Vegas Outlaws of the XFL.

== Early life ==
Berger attended Idaho Falls High School where he was a First-team All-state, All-area and All-conference defensive tackle. As a junior and senior, Idaho Falls went undefeated and won the Idaho State Football Championship each season, one of which he was named the Most Valuable Player (MVP) of the championship game. While he was there, Idaho Falls never lost a football game.

== College career ==
Berger attended the University of Utah where as a true freshman he redshirt in 1990. In 1991 as a redshirt freshman, he served as a backup nose guard and defensive tackle and recorded 17 tackles and one sack. As a redshirt sophomore in 1992, he recorded 68 tackles, and six sacks. In 1993, as a redshirt junior, he finished second on the team in tackles with 85. He also recorded eight tackles-for-loss, three sacks, two forced fumbles and one pass broken up and was named All-conference. As a redshirt senior in 1994, he recorded 44 tackles, three sacks and five passes broken up.

For his career, Berger recorded 214 tackles, 29 tackles-for-loss, 13 sacks, seven passes broken-up and two forced fumbles.

== Professional career ==
After going undrafted in the 1995 NFL draft, Berger joined the newly formed Amsterdam Admirals of the World League of American Football (later known as NFL Europe) for the 1995 season. In 1996 he joined the London Monarchs. That same year, he signed with the Arizona Cardinals of the National Football League (NFL), however he didn't appear in a game with the team. In 1998 he joined the Portland Forest Dragons of the Arena Football League (AFL), while there he recorded seven tackles. In 2001, he was drafted in the 16th round (124th overall) in the 2001 XFL draft by the Las Vegas Outlaws.

== Personal life ==
Outside of football, Berger is a law enforcement officer.
