= Jason Carthen =

American football player (born 1970))

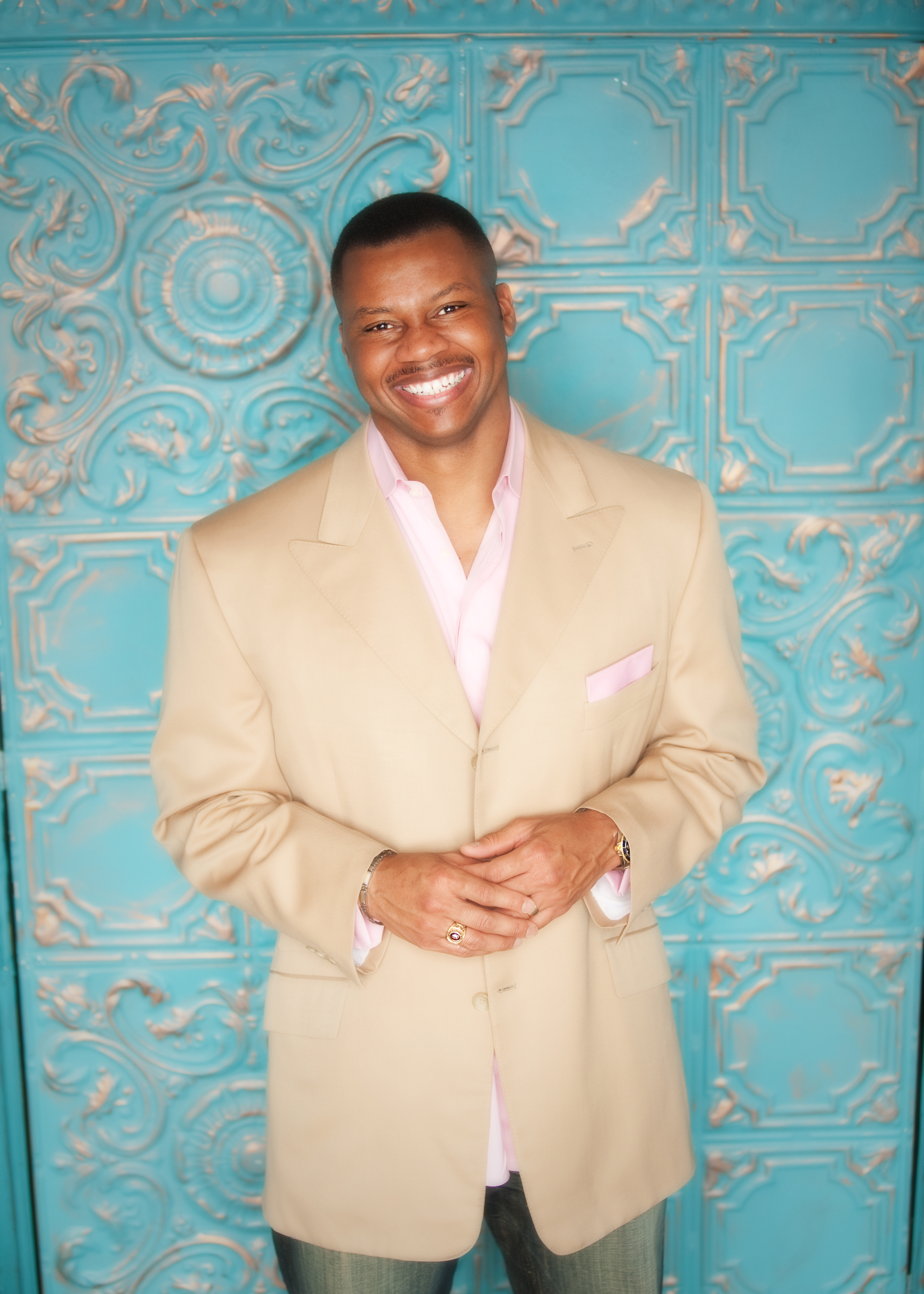
- Born: November 16, 1970 (age 55); Decatur, Alabama
- Education: Regent University, Harvard Business School, Malone University, Ohio University
- Occupations: Academic, consultant, television host, author, speaker
- Employer: Jason Carthen Enterprises LLC.
- Website: jasoncarthen.com

Jason Carthen (born November 16, 1970) is a retired American football player, an academic, radio personality, bestselling author, and public speaker. He was inducted into the Business and Leadership Hall of Fame in 2018. He was also named the 2018 Alumnus of the Year by Regent University for his contributions to entrepreneurship and business. He is president and CEO of Jason Carthen Enterprises LLC. and founder of Speak Life University and The I Speak Life Academy. Carthen is the creator and host of the radio show Discover the Leader in You that airs nationally each week on iHeart Radio and iTunes. He is the past host of the television show Joy in our Town, and TBN's Praise the Lord.

== Early life ==
Born in rural Decatur, Alabama, in a single parent household, Carthen later lived in Toledo Ohio. He graduated from Scott High School in Toledo, Ohio, in 1989.

== Football ==
=== High school ===
Carthen played on the offensive side of the ball while in high school. As a tight end, he received All City, All Conference and Honorable Mention All State recognition. Carthen also lettered in basketball and tennis during his high school career.

=== College ===
Carthen selected Ohio University where he played from 1989 through 1992. He was selected All-Conference in his Junior and Senior seasons. He was also voted team MVP his senior year and is the all-time leader in sacks (Record broken in 2016), tackles-for-Loss and caused fumbles.

=== Professional ===
Carthen had a three-year career in the National Football League from 1993 to 1995 as an outside linebacker. He was injured in 1995 after signing a free-agent contract offer with the Jacksonville Jaguars. He played one more year in NFL Europe with the Rhein Fire (Düsseldorf, Germany) from 1996 to 1997, where he led the league in special-teams tackles.

== Entrepreneur ==
In 2002, Carthen formed Redeemed Management & Consulting, an organizational consulting firm. Carthen served for over two decades in both the public and private sectors of Leadership and Business Management, specifically with the National Football League Players Association and The Leaders of Tomorrow Initiative.

== Radio and television ==
From 2009 to 2011, Carthen served as a host for WDLI, where he regularly appeared on Joy in Our Town and Praise the Lord. Prior to TBN, Carthen appeared as a guest on ABC and NBC, as well as ESPN, where he was a contributor to the Outside the Lines television show. In January 2010, he created his weekly podcast The Leadership Minute.

== Philanthropist ==
Carthen is a proponent of civic engagement, social justice and youth advocacy. He founded the Leaders of Tomorrow Initiativehttps://thelotinitiative.org/, a non-profit organization aiming to educate underprivileged youth about leadership, character and civic responsibilities. In 2008, he started a mentoring program that uses his own curriculum The T.I.E.S. that Bind to increase leadership capacities, character development, school engagement and reading skills among high school and college students.

== Academia ==
In the fall of 2006, Carthen joined the faculty of Bethel University as an adjunct professor of Leadership Studies. Carthen's research focuses upon motivation, hope, optimism, and positive psychology.

== Distinctions ==
Most recently Dr. Carthen was inducted into the Business and Leadership Hall of Fame in 2018. He was also named the 2018 Alumnus of the year by Regent University for his contributions to entrepreneurship and business. In 2017 Carthen was recognized by Forbes and other media publications as one of the top leadership and business coaches in the country. Carthen was recognized by the U.S. House of Representatives for his contribution to the leadership coaching profession. Carthen is a distinguished Fellow in the Beta Phi academic & literary society and has been featured in Harvard Business for his consultancy work.

== Books ==
- Carthen, Jason Daniel (2017). Destiny Focused Leadership How to Live and Leave a Legacy for Followers. I Speak Life Publishing. ISBN 978-1-941866-02-3.
- Carthen, Jason Daniel (2017). Journeys to Success: Health, Wellness, & Fitness Edition. International Best-seller. John Westley Clayton & Tom Cunningham. ISBN 978-1-947560-00-0.
- Carthen, Jason Daniel (2016). 52 Ways to Tackle Leadership for Your Success: Lessons in Leadership & Life Series. I Speak Life Publishing. ISBN 978-1-941866-00-9.
- Carthen, Jason Daniel (2013). A Man's Call to Accountability: A Leadership Devotional. I Speak Life Publishing. ISBN 978-1-941866-07-8.
- Carthen, Jason Daniel (2012). In the G.A.P.P. Leadership: How to Maximize Follower Productivity. I Speak Life Publishing. ISBN 978-1-941866-04-7.
- Carthen, Jason Daniel (2010). A Phenomenological inquiry of the psychological antecedents of preferred leadership behavior in a sports context. ProQuest LLC. ISBN 978-1-109-41264-2.
- Carthen, Jason Daniel (2006). Servant Leadership: An Introduction. ICFAI Press. ISBN 81-7881-793-4.

== Journal articles ==
- Carthen, Jason Daniel (2006). "War, Warrior Heroes, and the Advent of a Transactional Paradigm in Sports Antiquity". United States Sports Academy.
- Carthen, Jason Daniel (2010). "Servant Leadership and Positive Psychology as the Ratification of Follower Preferred Leadership in Organizational Settings". Regent University Servant Leadership Research Roundtable. Virginia Beach, VA.
- Carthen, Jason Daniel (2011). "Positive Psychology as a Conduit for the Enactment of Servant Leadership in an Organizational Framework". American Society of Business and Behavioral Sciences Journal.
