= Thurmond Moore =

American football coach (born 1955)

Biographical details
- Born: November 14, 1955 (age 71); Clark Air Base, Philippines
- Education: San Jose State University

Coaching career (HC unless noted)
- 1995: Amsterdam Admirals (DL)
- 1995: North Texas (RB)
- 1996: London Monarchs (DC)
- 1997–1998: Colorado State (DL)
- 1999–2000: Syracuse (DL)
- 2001–2003: Buffalo (DC)
- 2004: Tulsa (DS)
- 2005: UCLA (DL)
- 2009: New York Sentinels (DL)
- 2015: Brophy College Preparatory (DC)

Thurmond Moore (born November 14, 1955) is an American football coach. He specializes in coaching defensive players.

From 1997 to 1998 he was the defensive line coach for Colorado State where he helped coach the team to a 14–2 record in a successful season that included winning the 1997 Western Athletic Conference (WAC) by defeating the New Mexico Lobos in the 1997 WAC Championship Game. This earned the team a spot in the 1997 Holiday Bowl where they defeated the Missouri Tigers 35 to 24.

From 1999 to 2000, he was the defensive line coach for the Syracuse University football team and from 2001 to 2003 he was the defensive coordinator at the University of Buffalo. During his two seasons at Syracuse, the school ranked in the top 20 best defenses in the nation (in yards allowed), and during his tenure at Buffalo the school had one of the greatest improvements in defensive categories, both in yards and points allowed.

In 2004 he was the cornerbacks coach at the University of Tulsa where the team's pass defense was one of the best in the nation, allowing only 191 yards per game. From 2005 to 2006 he was the defensive line coach for the UCLA Bruins.

Prior to coaching college teams starting in 1997, he had previously coached in NFL Europe as a defensive coach for the London Monarchs and the Amsterdam Admirals.

From 2007 onwards, Moore was a coach at several high school football teams in the United States.

He graduated from San Jose State in 1977 with a degree in human performance, where he also played as a fullback and tight end on the San Jose State Spartans football team. Moore developed and taught a training camp where he trained youth players and coaches on proper tackling technique to reduce the risk of head injuries.

== Exteneral links ==
- Tulsa Golden Hurricane bio
- TA Website
