= 1996 WLAF season =

European-American football season

The 1996 WLAF season was the fourth World League of American Football (WLAF) season, and its second season under a six-team all-European format.

The Scottish Claymores, led by head coach Jim Criner in his second year, finished the regular season in first place with a 7–3 winning record, and beat the Frankfurt Galaxy 32–27 in World Bowl '96. The victory marked Scotland's first World Bowl championship, in its second active season.

== Season ==
The Claymores had gained the right to play as home team in the World Bowl in week 5. They beat the Galaxy 20–0 at the Waldstadion, taking the World Bowl berth as the midseason leaders. This ended an eight-game winning streak from 1995–96 for the Galaxy. The Galaxy finished the regular season in second place with a record of six wins and four losses. Amsterdam and Barcelona were next highest with 50% win–loss records.

World League of American Football
Team	W	L	T	PCT	PF	PA	Home	Road	STK
Scottish Claymores	7	3	0	.700	233	190	5–0	2–3	L1
Frankfurt Galaxy	6	4	0	.600	221	220	3–2	3–2	W2
Amsterdam Admirals	5	5	0	.500	250	210	4–1	1–4	L1
Barcelona Dragons	5	5	0	.500	192	230	4–1	1–4	W1
London Monarchs	4	6	0	.400	161	192	3–2	1–4	W1
Rhein Fire	3	7	0	.300	176	191	2–3	1–4	L2

== World Bowl '96 ==
World Bowl '96 was the fourth championship game of the World League of American Football (WLAF). It took place at Murrayfield Stadium in Edinburgh, Scotland on Sunday, June 23, 1996. The 7–3 Scottish Claymores defeated the 6–4 Frankfurt Galaxy (the defending champions) 32–27 and, led by head coach Jim Criner, completed the league's first ever worst to first turnaround. Claymores wide receiver Yo Murphy was voted MVP for his 163 receiving yards and three touchdowns. 38,982 fans were in attendance that day, the highest in Claymores history and the largest crowd ever assembled for an American football game in Scotland.

The Claymores won the regular season series against the Galaxy, 20–0 in Frankfurt and 20–17 in Edinburgh.
