= 1995 Frankfurt Galaxy season =

World League of American Football team season

- General manager: Chris Heyne
- Head coach: Ernie Stautner
- Home stadium: Waldstadion

Results
- Record: 6–4
- Division place: 2nd
- Playoffs: World Bowl '95 champion

The 1995 Frankfurt Galaxy season was the third season for the franchise in the World League of American Football (WLAF). The team was led by head coach Ernie Stautner in his first year, and played its home games at Waldstadion in Frankfurt, Germany. They finished the regular season in second place with a record of six wins and four losses. In World Bowl '95, Frankfurt defeated the Amsterdam Admirals 26–22. The victory marked the franchise's first World Bowl championship.

== Offseason ==
=== World League draft ===
1995 Frankfurt Galaxy World League draft selections
Draft order		Player name	Position	College
Round	Choice	Player name	Position	College
1	2	Bryan Addison	DB	Hawaii
2	11	Dondre Owens	CB	Howard
3	14	Clarence Williams	TE	Washington State
4	23	Frank Adams	CB	South Carolina
5	26	David Wilkins	DE	Eastern Kentucky
6	35	Toby Mills	C	Arizona State
7	38	Mike Kerr	DE	Florida
8	47	Mark Montgomery	RB	Wisconsin
9	50	Mike Stonebreaker	LB	Notre Dame
10	59	Donald Reynolds	DT	Virginia
11	62	Nate Dingle	LB	Cincinnati
12	71	Shawn Smith	LB	San Diego State
13	74	Shawn Collins	WR	Northern Arizona
14	83	Johnny Dixon	S	Mississippi
15	86	Bobby Olive	WR	Ohio State
16	95	Todd Peat	G	Northern Illinois
17	98	Ronnie Dixon	DT	Cincinnati
18	107	John Oglesby	RB	Texas Christian
19	110	Lamark Shackerford	DT	Wisconsin
20	119	Chris Hall	S	East Carolina
21	122	Mario Bailey	WR	Washington
22	131	Matt Elliott	G	Northern Arizona
23	134	Franco Grilla	K	Central Florida
24	143	Cecil Doggette	CB	West Virginia
25	146	Keith Williams	WR	San Diego State
26	155	Bob Brasher	TE	Arizona State
27	158	Keo Coleman	LB	Mississippi State
28	167	Nathaniel Bolton	WR	Mississippi College
29	170	Kevin Little	LB	North Carolina A&T
30	179	Jerrod Washington	RB	Virginia
31	182	Mike Bellamy	WR	Illinois
32	191	James Spears	DE	Temple
33	194	Marcus Lee	FB	Syracuse
34	203	Andrew Beckett	DE	Rutgers
35	206	Dean Lytle	LB	Notre Dame
36	215	Greg Briggs	S	Texas Southern
37	218	Mike Iaquaniello	S	Michigan State
38	227	Justin Starck	T	Oregon
39	230	Curtis Luper	RB	Stephen F. Austin
40	239	Raymond Batiste	G	Northeast Louisiana
41	242	Gary Reid	NT	Cincinnati
42	251	Jerome Smith	WR	Indiana (PA)
43	254	Dwayne Davis	S	Colorado
44	263	Derick Pickett	T	Penn State
45	266	Walter Campbell	DE	Eastern Michigan

=== NFL allocations ===
Player name	Position	College	NFL team
Lemanski Hall	LB	Alabama	Houston Oilers
Sean Jackson	RB	Florida State	Houston Oilers
Paul Justin	QB	Arizona State	Indianapolis Colts
Jim Miller	QB	Michigan State	Pittsburgh Steelers
Russ McCullough	OT	Missouri	Los Angeles Raiders
Willie Stubbins	OT	Texas Southern	Los Angeles Raiders
Kipp Vickers	G	Miami (FL)	Indianapolis Colts

== Personnel ==
=== Staff ===
1995 Frankfurt Galaxy (NFL Europe) staff
Front office: General Manager – Chris Heyne; Head coaches: Head Coach – Ernie Stautner; Offensive coaches: Offensive Coordinator/Quarterbacks/Wide Receivers – Joe Clark; Running Backs/Special Teams – John Cooper; Offensive Line – Mark McHale	Defensive coaches: Defensive Coordinator/Linebackers – Ray Willsey; Defensive Line – C. L. Whittington; National Coach/Defensive Backs – Florian Berrenberg

=== Roster ===
1995 Frankfurt Galaxy final roster
Quarterbacks: 14 Brad Bretz; 8 Bryan Fortay; 11 Paul Justin; 14 Jim Miller; Running backs: 7 Nathaniel Bolton; 33 Craig Thomas; 43 Kevin Williams; Wide receivers: 81 Mario Bailey; 84 Mike Bellamy; 82 Shawn Collins; 2 Tony Harrison; 1 Bobby Olive; Tight ends: 87 Bob Brasher; 88 Clarence Williams	Offensive linemen: 68 Mark Dixon G; 79 Russ McCullough T; 62 Toby Mills C; 69 Todd Peat G; 60 Justin Starck T; 73 Willie Stubbins T; 71 Kipp Vickers G; Defensive linemen: 63 Jon Baker DE; 66 Mike Kerr DE; 95 Gary Reid DT; 90 Don Reynolds DT; 74 David Wilkins DE	Linebackers: 53 Tom Cavallo MLB; 58 Nate Dingle OLB; 55 Shawn Smith OLB; 54 Mike Stonebreaker MLB; Defensive backs: 29 Greg Briggs S; 42 Johnny Dixon S; 22 Cecil Doggette CB; 32 Chris Hall S; 21 Jackie Kellogg CB; 20 Dondre Owens CB; Special teams: 5 Daron Alcorn K/P	National players: 83 (Germany) Martin Driever TE; 23 (Germany) Markus Finke RB; 77 (Germany) Olaf Hampel G/T; 86 (Germany) Werner Hippler TE; 9 (Germany) Ralf Kleinmann K; 99 (Germany) Frank Messmer DT; 24 (Germany) Ingo Seibert RB; Rookies in italics

== Schedule ==
Week	Date	Kickoff (Note: All times local to where the game was played.)	Opponent	Results		Game site	Attendance
Week	Date	Kickoff	Opponent	Final score	Team record	Game site	Attendance
1	Saturday, April 8	7:00 p.m.	London Monarchs	W 45–22	1–0	Waldstadion	28,021
2	Saturday, April 15	7:00 p.m.	at Amsterdam Admirals	L 12–14	1–1	De Meer Stadion	5,321
3	Saturday, April 22	7:00 p.m.	Scottish Claymores	L 14–20	1–2	Waldstadion	25,182
4	Sunday, April 30	7:00 p.m.	at Rhein Fire	L 20–21	1–3	Rheinstadion	19,181
5	Saturday, May 6	7:00 p.m.	Barcelona Dragons	W 24–20	2–3	Waldstadion	30,598
6	Monday, May 15	7:30 p.m.	at London Monarchs	W 27–7	3–3	White Hart Lane	8,912
7	Saturday, May 20	7:00 p.m.	Rhein Fire	L 28–41	3–4	Waldstadion	33,112
8	Sunday, May 28	7:00 p.m.	Amsterdam Admirals	W 28–13	4–4	Waldstadion	28,368
9	Sunday, June 4	3:00 p.m.	at Scottish Claymores	W 37–24	5–4	Murrayfield Stadium	6,840
10	Saturday, June 10	5:30 p.m.	at Barcelona Dragons	W 44–20	6–4	Estadi Olímpic de Montjuïc	21,380
World Bowl '95
11	Saturday, June 17		Amsterdam Admirals	W 26–22	7–4	Olympisch Stadion	23,847

== Standings ==
World League of American Football
Team	W	L	T	PCT	PF	PA	Home	Road	STK
Amsterdam Admirals	9	1	0	.900	246	152	5–0	4–1	W2
Frankfurt Galaxy	6	4	0	.600	279	202	3–2	3–2	W3
Barcelona Dragons	5	5	0	.500	237	247	2–3	3–2	L1
London Monarchs	4	6	0	.400	174	220	1–4	3–2	L2
Rhein Fire	4	6	0	.400	221	279	2–3	2–3	L3
Scottish Claymores	2	8	0	.200	153	210	0–5	2–3	W1

== Game summaries ==
=== Week 1: vs London Monarchs ===
Week One: London Monarchs at Frankfurt Galaxy – Game summary

Quarter	1	2	3	4	Total
London	0	6	0	16	22
Frankfurt	7	14	24	0	45

at Waldstadion, Frankfurt, Germany

- Date: Saturday, April 8
- Game time: 7:00 p.m. CEST
- Game attendance: 28,021
- Referee: Mike Carey

=== Week 2: at Amsterdam Admirals ===
Week Two: Frankfurt Galaxy at Amsterdam Admirals – Game summary

Quarter	1	2	3	4	Total
Frankfurt	7	0	0	5	12
Amsterdam	0	14	0	0	14

at De Meer Stadion, Amsterdam, Netherlands

- Date: Saturday, April 15
- Game time: 7:00 p.m. CEST
- Game attendance: 5,321
- Referee: Mike Carey

=== Week 3: vs Scottish Claymores ===
Week Three: Scottish Claymores at Frankfurt Galaxy – Game summary

Quarter	1	2	3	4	Total
Scotland	7	0	0	13	20
Frankfurt	0	0	7	7	14

at Waldstadion, Frankfurt, Germany

- Date: Saturday, April 22
- Game time: 7:00 p.m. CEST
- Game attendance: 25,182
- Referee: Phil Luckett

=== Week 4: at Rhein Fire ===
Week Four: Frankfurt Galaxy at Rhein Fire – Game summary

Quarter	1	2	Total
Frankfurt			0
Rhein			0

at Rheinstadion, Düsseldorf, Germany

- Date: Sunday, April 30
- Game time: 7:00 p.m. CEST
- Game attendance: 19,181

=== Week 5: vs Barcelona Dragons ===
Week Five: Barcelona Dragons at Frankfurt Galaxy – Game summary

Quarter	1	2	3	4	Total
Barcelona	3	3	0	14	20
Frankfurt	3	14	0	7	24

at Waldstadion, Frankfurt, Germany

- Date: Saturday, May 6
- Game time: 7:00 p.m. CEST
- Game attendance: 30,598
- Referee: Larry Nemmers

=== Week 6: at London Monarchs ===
Week Six: Frankfurt Galaxy at London Monarchs – Game summary

Quarter	1	2	3	4	Total
Frankfurt	7	10	10	0	27
London	7	0	0	0	7

at White Hart Lane, London, England

- Date: Monday, May 15
- Game time: 7:30 p.m. BST
- Game attendance: 8,912

=== Week 7: vs Rhein Fire ===
Week Seven: Rhein Fire at Frankfurt Galaxy – Game summary

Quarter	1	2	Total
Rhein			0
Frankfurt			0

at Waldstadion, Frankfurt, Germany

- Date: Saturday, May 20
- Game time: 7:00 p.m. CEST
- Game attendance: 33,112

=== Week 8: vs Amsterdam Admirals ===
Week Eight: Amsterdam Admirals at Frankfurt Galaxy – Game summary

Quarter	1	2	3	4	Total
Amsterdam	0	3	7	3	13
Frankfurt	7	7	7	7	28

at Waldstadion, Frankfurt, Germany

- Date: Sunday, May 28
- Game time: 7:00 p.m. CEST
- Game attendance: 28,368

=== Week 9: at Scottish Claymores ===
Week Nine: Frankfurt Galaxy at Scottish Claymores – Game summary

Quarter	1	2	Total
Frankfurt			0
Scotland			0

at Murrayfield Stadium, Edinburgh, Scotland

- Date: Sunday, June 4
- Game time: 3:00 p.m. BST
- Game attendance: 6,840

=== Week 10: at Barcelona Dragons ===
Week Ten: Frankfurt Galaxy at Barcelona Dragons – Game summary

Quarter	1	2	3	4	Total
Frankfurt	3	13	7	21	44
Barcelona	0	13	0	7	20

at Estadi Olímpic de Montjuïc, Barcelona, Spain

- Date: Saturday, June 10
- Game time: 5:30 p.m. CEST
- Game attendance: 21,380
- Referee: Larry Nemmers
