= 1995 Scottish Claymores season =

World League of American Football team season

- General manager: Sandy Waters
- Head coach: Jim Criner
- Home stadium: Murrayfield Stadium

Results
- Record: 2–8
- Division place: 6th
- Playoffs: did not qualify

The 1995 Scottish Claymores season was the inaugural season for the franchise in the World League of American Football (WLAF). The team played its home games at Murrayfield Stadium in Edinburgh, Scotland. They finished the regular season in sixth place with a record of two wins and eight losses.

The Claymores, after a 5–0 record in the preseason, surprisingly fired their head coach, Larry Kuharich, five days before their WLAF kickoff because "his coaching philosophy did not mesh with the make-up of the team". Special teams coordinator Jim Criner became head coach.

== Offseason ==
=== NFL allocations ===
Player name	Position	College	NFL team
Matt Blundin	QB	Virginia	Kansas City Chiefs
Jocelyn Borgella	CB	Cincinnati	Detroit Lions
Allen DeGraffenreid	WR	Ohio State	Kansas City Chiefs
Derrell Mitchell	WR	Texas Tech	New Orleans Saints
David Ware	T	Virginia	Kansas City Chiefs
Lee Williamson	QB	Presbyterian	Houston Oilers

== Personnel ==
=== Staff ===
1995 Scottish Claymores staff
Front office: General Manager – Sandy Waters; Head coaches: Head Coach – Jim Criner; Offensive coaches: Offensive Coordinator – Doug Williams; National Coach – Mike Kenny	Defensive coaches: Defensive Line – Bill Dutton

=== Roster ===
1995 Scottish Claymores final roster
Quarterbacks: 7 Jim Ballard; 14 Matt Blundin; 4 Terry Karg; 10 Lee Williamson; Running backs: 33 Lorenzo Graham; 27 Siran Stacy; 40 Markus Thomas; 43 Aubrey Thompson; Wide receivers: 82 Tim Barnett; 80 Allen DeGraffenreid; 88 Lee Harris; 81 Sean Jordan; 86 Derrell Mitchell; Tight ends: 83 Dwayne Chandler	Offensive linemen: 67 Rudy Barber G; 69 Dennis Dahlke C; 76 Andre Hewitt T; 72 Tommy Holliday T; 70 Hesham Ismail G; 68 Ernie Rogers T; Defensive linemen: 95 Michael Brandon DE; 99 Jerold Jeffcoat DT; 96 Troy Ridgley DT; 90 Lamar Rogers DT; 75 James Spencer DE; 94 Alan Young DE	Linebackers: 58 Ricky Andrews OLB; 52 Tim Brown OLB; 45 Jerry Freese OLB; 53 Brian Jones MLB; 54 Mark Sander MLB; 59 David Webb OLB; Defensive backs: 28 Jocelyn Borgella CB; 21 Darren Butler CB; 34 George Coghill S; 29 Corris Ervin CB/S; 31 Chauncey Hogan CB; 42 Darrell Lewis S; 22 James Williams CB; Special teams: 3 Sean Conley K/P	National players: 41 (Scotland) Darren Chapman RB; 73 (Scotland) Gerard Colquhoun C/G; 81 (Scotland) Scott Couper WR; 84 (Scotland) Andy Meikle WR; 4 (Scotland) Derek Noble K; 44 (Scotland) Ben Torriero RB/P; Rookies in italics

== Standings ==
World League of American Football
Team	W	L	T	PCT	PF	PA	Home	Road	STK
Amsterdam Admirals	9	1	0	.900	246	152	5–0	4–1	W2
Frankfurt Galaxy	6	4	0	.600	279	202	3–2	3–2	W3
Barcelona Dragons	5	5	0	.500	237	247	2–3	3–2	L1
London Monarchs	4	6	0	.400	174	220	1–4	3–2	L2
Rhein Fire	4	6	0	.400	221	279	2–3	2–3	L3
Scottish Claymores	2	8	0	.200	153	210	0–5	2–3	W1

== Game summaries ==
=== Week 3: at Frankfurt Galaxy ===
Week Three: Scottish Claymores at Frankfurt Galaxy – Game summary

Quarter	1	2	3	4	Total
Scotland	7	0	0	13	20
Frankfurt	0	0	7	7	14

at Waldstadion, Frankfurt, Germany

- Date: Saturday, 22 April
- Game time: 7:00 p.m. CEST
- Game attendance: 25,182
- Referee: Phil Luckett

=== Week 7: at Amsterdam Admirals ===
Week Seven: Scottish Claymores at Amsterdam Admirals – Game summary

Quarter	1	2	3	4	Total
Scotland	7	6	0	0	13
Amsterdam	6	7	7	10	30

at Olympisch Stadion, Amsterdam, Netherlands

- Date: Saturday, 20 May
- Game time: 7:00 p.m. CEST
- Game attendance: 10,423
