= Casey Weldon =

American football player (born 1969)

No. 11, 3
- Position: Quarterback

Personal information
- Born: February 3, 1969 (age 57); Americus, Georgia, U.S.
- Listed height: 6 ft 1 in (1.85 m)
- Listed weight: 206 lb (93 kg)

Career information
- High school: North Florida Christian (Tallahassee, Florida)
- College: Florida State
- NFL draft: 1992: 4th round, 102nd overall pick

Career history
- Philadelphia Eagles (1992); Tampa Bay Buccaneers (1993–1996); → Barcelona Dragons (1995); San Diego Chargers (1997); Washington Redskins (1998–1999); Birmingham Thunderbolts (2001)

Awards and highlights
- Johnny Unitas Golden Arm Award (1991); Quarterback of the Year (1991); First-team All-American (1991)

Career NFL statistics
- Passing attempts: 120
- Passing completions: 60
- Completion percentage: 50.0%
- TD–INT: 1–4
- Passing yards: 713
- Passer rating: 57.4
- Stats at Pro Football Reference

William Casey Weldon (born February 3, 1969) is an American former professional football player who was a quarterback in the National Football League (NFL). He played college football for the Florida State Seminoles from 1988 to 1991. During his senior season in 1991, Weldon was a first-team All-American and finished runner-up in the Heisman Trophy balloting to Desmond Howard of Michigan.

Weldon was selected in the fourth round of the 1992 NFL draft by the Philadelphia Eagles. He also played in the World League and for the Birmingham Thunderbolts of the XFL.

== College career ==
=== Statistics ===
Season	Team	Games			Passing								Rushing			
Season	Team	GP	GS	Record	Cmp	Att	Pct	Yds	Y/A	TD	Int	Rtg	Att	Yds	Avg	TD
1988	Florida State	4	0	—	10	26	38.5	244	9.4	3	2	140.0	2	15	7.5	1
1989	Florida State	7	0	—	12	24	50.0	257	10.7	5	1	200.4	3	9	3.0	0
1990	Florida State	11	5	5−0	112	182	61.5	1,600	8.8	12	4	152.7	29	21	0.7	0
1991	Florida State	11	11	9−2	189	313	60.4	2,527	8.1	22	8	146.3	38	-30	-0.8	0
Career		33	16	14−2	323	545	59.3	4,628	8.5	42	15	150.5	72	15	0.2	1
Bowl games		3	2	2–0	36	69	52.1	340	4.9	0	6	76.2	13	14	1.1	2

Bowl games only began counting toward single-season and career statistics in 2002.

- 1990 Fiesta Bowl – 0/1 passing.
- 1990 Blockbuster Bowl – 22/36, 248 yards,2 Int. Six rushes for 22 yards, TD
- 1992 Cotton Bowl Classic – 14/32, 92 yards, 4 Int. Seven rushes -8 yards, TD

== Professional career ==
Pre-draft measurables
Height	Weight	Arm length	Hand span	40-yard dash	10-yard split	20-yard split	20-yard shuttle	Vertical jump
6 ft 0 5/8 in (1.84 m)	200 lb (91 kg)	31 in (0.79 m)	9 1/2 in (0.24 m)	4.83 s	1.68 s	2.80 s	4.06 s	32.5 in (0.83 m)

=== Philadelphia Eagles ===
The Philadelphia Eagles selected Weldon 102nd overall in the fourth round of the 1992 NFL draft. He was inactive and did not appear in a game.

=== Tampa Bay Bucaneers ===
On September 1, 1993, Weldon signed with the Tampa Bay Buccaneers. He was the third-string quarterback to Craig Erickson and Steve DeBerg for the 1993 season. On the season, Weldon appeared in three games and completed six of 11 pass attempts for 55 yards and an interception.

After appearing in just two games during the 1994 season, Weldon was allocated to the Barcelona Dragons of the World League of American Football (WLAF). In week 4 against London, Weldon threw a 69-yard touchdown pass to fellow Buccaneers teammate Tyree Davis. After week 5, Weldon returned allocation to Tampa Bay due to injuries.

In week 14 of the 1995 season, Weldon threw his first NFL touchdown pass to Alvin Harper against the Minnesota Vikings. In 1995, Weldon appeared in every game as a holder and threw passes in six others.

=== San Diego Chargers ===
On November 14, 1997, Weldon signed with the San Diego Chargers. He was elevated to the active roster, but never appeared in a game. Weldon was released on February 13, 1998, and resigned April 10. On August 30, 1998, Weldon was released at the conclusion of the preseason.

=== Washington Redskins ===
On September 23, 1998, Weldon signed with the Washington Redskins. Despite being on the active roster for the 1998 and 1999 season, Weldon appeared in just two games for the 1999 season and did not attempt a pass. On April 21, 2000 Weldon was released.

=== Birmingham Thunderbolts ===
On October 28, 2000, Weldon was selected 2nd overall by the Birmingham Thunderbolts in the first round of the 2001 XFL draft. Weldon won the starting quarterback position. In week 1 against Memphis, Weldon completed 24 of 42 passes for 312 yards with two touchdowns and an interception in 22–20 defeat. The following week, Weldon earned the Bolts first franchise victory over New York/New Jersey in a 19–12 win. In week six against Los Angeles, Weldon threw for 300 yards and three touchdowns in a 35–26 loss to the eventual champions. In the fourth quarter, Weldon sustained a season ending shoulder injury.

== High school coaching career ==
Weldon played high school quarterback at North Florida Christian High School, and he returned there as the varsity head football coach in 2006. On December 12, 2007, and after getting NFC to the Florida division 1A state championship game twice in his two years as head coach, but losing both times, NFC fired him and rehired former NFC head coach Tim Cokely. Weldon finished his two-year NFC career with an overall record of 23–5. In May 2008 he was hired as the new offensive coordinator at Leon High School.

== Professional career statistics ==
NFL

Year	Team	Games			Passing								Rushing			
Year	Team	GP	GS	Record	Cmp	Att	Pct	Yds	Y/A	TD	Int	Rtg	Att	Yds	Avg	TD
1992	PHI	0	0	—	DNP											
1993	TB	3	0	—	6	11	54.5	55	5.0	0	1	30.5	0	0	0.0	0
1994	TB	2	0	—	7	9	77.8	63	7.0	0	0	95.8	0	0	0.0	0
1995	TB	16	0	—	42	91	46.2	519	5.7	1	2	58.8	5	5	1.0	1
1996	TB	3	0	—	5	9	55.6	76	8.4	0	1	44.0	2	-1	-0.5	0
1997	SD	0	0	—	DNP											
1998	WAS	0	0	—	DNP											
1999	WAS	2	0	—									5	-4	-0.8	0
Career		26	0	0–0	60	120	50.0	713	5.9	1	4	57.4	12	0	0.0	1

WLAF

Year	Team	Games			Passing								Rushing			
Year	Team	GP	GS	Record	Cmp	Att	Pct	Yds	Y/A	TD	Int	Rtg	Att	Yds	Avg	TD
1995	Barcelona	5	?	?–?	41	91	45.1	543	6.0	3	9	35.9	8	44	5.5	0
Career		5	?	?–?	41	91	45.1	543	6.0	3	9	35.9	8	44	5.5	1

XFL

Year	Team	Games			Passing								Rushing			
Year	Team	GP	GS	Record	Cmp	Att	Pct	Yds	Y/A	TD	Int	Rtg	Att	Yds	Avg	TD
2001	BIR	6	6	2–4	102	164	62.2	1,228	7.5	7	5	86.6	20	30	1.5	0
Career		6	6	2–4	102	164	62.2	1,228	7.5	7	5	86.6	20	30	1.5	0
