= 1992 San Francisco 49ers season =

American football team season

- Owner: Eddie DeBartolo, Jr.
- General manager: Carmen Policy
- Head coach: George Seifert
- Offensive coordinator: Mike Shanahan
- Defensive coordinator: Bill McPherson
- Home stadium: Candlestick Park

Results
- Record: 14–2
- Division place: 1st NFC West
- Playoffs: Won Divisional Playoffs (vs. Redskins) 20–13; Lost NFC Championship (vs. Cowboys) 20–30
- Pro Bowlers: G Guy McIntyre; T Steve Wallace; TE Brent Jones; WR Jerry Rice; QB Steve Young; RB Ricky Watters; DE Pierce Holt

The 1992 San Francisco 49ers season was the franchise's 43rd season in the National Football League (NFL) and their 47th overall. The 49ers appeared in the NFC Championship Game for the fourth time in five seasons (and what would eventually be 10 in 17 seasons dating from 1981 to 1997).

1992 was the last season the 49ers had Joe Montana on the roster. His last game as a 49er was a December 28 Monday Night Football win against the Detroit Lions.

== Offseason ==
Additions	Subtractions
WR Odessa Turner (Giants)	LB Charles Haley (Cowboys)
S Thane Gash (Browns)	CB Darryl Pollard (Buccaneers)
FB Marc Logan (Dolphins)	S Dave Waymer (Raiders)
DE Garin Veris (Patriots)	DT Jim Burt (retirement)
G Ralph Tamm (Bengals)	P Joe Prokop (Dolphins)
	FB Harry Sydney (Packers)
	WR Sanjay Beach (Packers)
	G Tom Neville (Packers)
	T Frank Pollack (Broncos)
	RB Spencer Tillman (Oilers)

=== Draft ===
1992 San Francisco 49ers draft
Round	Pick	Player	Position	College	Notes
1	18	Dana Hall	FS	Washington	
2	45	Amp Lee	RB	Florida State	
3	76	Brian Bollinger	G	North Carolina	
4	89	Mark Thomas	DE	NC State	Made roster in 1993
6	151	Damien Russell	DB	Virginia Tech	Made roster in 1993
9	242	Darian Hagan	QB	Colorado	
10	269	Corey Mayfield	DT	Oklahoma	
11	300	Tom Covington	TE	Georgia Tech	
12	327	Matt LaBounty	DE	Oregon	Made roster in 1993
Made roster * Made at least one Pro Bowl during career

=== Undrafted free agents ===
1992 undrafted free agents of note
Player	Position	College
Derrick Deese	Guard	USC
Kevin Evans	Wide receiver	San Jose State
Gary Morris	Wide receiver	Norfolk State
Mark Seay	Wide receiver	Long Beach State
Clarence Siler	Linebacker	Cal State Fullerton
Leroy Smith	Linebacker	Iowa
Freddie Smith	Cornerback	San Jose State
David Wilkins	Defensive end	Eastern Kentucky

== Personnel ==
With the departure of Mike Holmgren to Green Bay, the 49ers hired Denver Broncos offensive assistant Mike Shanahan to run the offense. Jeff Fisher joined the coaching staff as defensive backs coach.

=== Staff ===
1992 San Francisco 49ers staff
Front office: Owner – Edward J. DeBartolo, Jr.; President – Carmen Policy; Vice president of football administration – John McVay; Vice president of player personnel – Dwight Clark; Administrator of football operations – Neal Dahlen; Administrator of college scouting – Tony Razzano; Administrator of pro personnel – Allan Webb; Head coaches: Head coach – George Seifert; Offensive coaches: Offensive coordinator/quarterbacks – Mike Shanahan; Running backs – Carl Jackson; Receivers – Ray Sherman; Tight ends/offensive line assistant – Mike Solari; Offensive line – Bobb McKittrick	Defensive coaches: Defensive coordinator – Bill McPherson; Defensive line – John Marshall; Linebackers – Bob Zeman; Defensive backs – Jeff Fisher; Defensive assistant – Dwaine Board; Defensive assistant – Tommy Hart; Special teams coaches: Special teams coordinator – Alan Lowry; Strength and conditioning: Physical development coordinator – Jerry Attaway

=== Roster ===
1992 San Francisco 49ers roster
Quarterbacks (QB): 8 Steve Young; 13 Steve Bono; 16 Joe Montana; Running backs (RB): 22 Amp Lee; 27 Adam Walker; 32 Ricky Watters; 43 Marc Logan FB; 44 Tom Rathman FB; Wide receivers (WR): 80 Jerry Rice; 82 John Taylor; 86 Odessa Turner; 88 Mike Sherrard; Tight ends (TE): 81 Jamie Williams; 84 Brent Jones	Offensive linemen (OL): 60 Chuck Thomas C; 61 Jesse Sapolu C; 62 Guy McIntyre G; 65 Harry Boatswain T; 67 Roy Foster G; 71 Brian Bollinger G; 74 Steve Wallace T; 79 Harris Barton T; Defensive linemen (DL): 56 Martin Harrison DE; 66 David Wilkins DE; 75 Kevin Fagan DE; 78 Pierce Holt DE; 93 Garin Veris DE; 95 Michael Carter NT; 96 Dennis Brown DE; 97 Ted Washington NT	Linebackers (LB): 53 Bill Romanowski OLB; 55 John Johnson OLB; 59 Keith DeLong ILB; 90 Darin Jordan ILB; 92 Tim Harris OLB; 98 Antonio Goss OLB; 99 Michael Walter ILB; Defensive backs (DB): 24 Alan Grant CB; 25 Eric Davis CB; 26 Mike McGruder CB; 28 Dana Hall FS; 29 Don Griffin CB; 31 Thane Gash SS; 36 Merton Hanks CB; 41 David Whitmore SS; Special teams (ST): 6 Mike Cofer K; 10 Klaus Wilmsmeyer P	Practice squad: 68 Matt LaBounty DE; 83 Mark Seay WR; Reserve: 14 Bill Musgrave QB (IR); 35 Dexter Carter RB (IR); 38 Damien Russell S (NF-Inj.); 45 Kevin Lewis CB (IR); 54 Mitch Donahue LB (IR); 63 Derrick Deese G (IR); 64 Ralph Tamm T (IR); 72 Mark Thomas DE (IR); 89 Wesley Walls TE (IR); 91 Larry Roberts DE (IR); -- Tom Covington TE (NF-Inj.); -- Rodney Thomas CB (IR); Rookies in italics 47 active, 12 reserve, 2 practice squad

== Preseason ==
Week	Date	Opponent	Result	Record	Venue
1	August 3	Denver Broncos	W 13–7	1–0	Candlestick Park
2	August 8	Los Angeles Raiders	W 24–10	2–0	Candlestick Park
3	August 16	vs. Washington Redskins	W 17–15	3–0	Wembley Stadium
4	August 21	at San Diego Chargers	W 20–14	4–0	Jack Murphy Stadium
5	August 28	Seattle Seahawks	W 24–17	5–0	Candlestick Park

== Regular season ==
=== Schedule ===
Week	Date	Opponent	Result	Record	Venue	Attendance
1	September 6	at New York Giants	**W** 31–14	1–0	Giants Stadium	74,519
2	September 13	Buffalo Bills	**L** 31–34	1–1	Candlestick Park	64,053
3	September 20	at New York Jets	**W** 31–14	2–1	Giants Stadium	71,020
4	September 27	at **New Orleans Saints**	**W** 16–10	3–1	Louisiana Superdome	68,591
5	October 4	**Los Angeles Rams**	**W** 27–24	4–1	Candlestick Park	63,071
6	October 11	at New England Patriots	**W** 24–12	5–1	Foxboro Stadium	54,126
7	October 18	**Atlanta Falcons**	**W** 56–17	6–1	Candlestick Park	63,302
8	Bye					
9	November 1	at Phoenix Cardinals	**L** 14–24	6–2	Sun Devil Stadium	47,642
10	November 9	at **Atlanta Falcons**	**W** 41–3	7–2	Georgia Dome	67,404
11	November 15	**New Orleans Saints**	**W** 21–20	8–2	Candlestick Park	64,895
12	November 22	at **Los Angeles Rams**	**W** 27–10	9–2	Anaheim Stadium	65,858
13	November 29	Philadelphia Eagles	**W** 20–14	10–2	Candlestick Park	64,374
14	December 6	Miami Dolphins	**W** 27–3	11–2	Candlestick Park	58,474
15	December 13	at Minnesota Vikings	**W** 20–17	12–2	Hubert H. Humphrey Metrodome	60,685
16	December 19	Tampa Bay Buccaneers	**W** 21–14	13–2	Candlestick Park	60,519
17	December 28	Detroit Lions	**W** 24–6	14–2	Candlestick Park	55,907
Note: Intra-division opponents are in **bold** text.

=== Game summaries ===
==== Week 1: at New York Giants ====
Steve Young completed four of six passes for 27 yards and a touchdown but was knocked out of the game; backup QB Steve Bono threw for 187 yards and two touchdowns while Ricky Watters rushed for 100 yards. Phil Simms was intercepted in the fourth quarter and the Niners scored on the pick.

==== Week 2: vs. Buffalo Bills ====
In the first NFL game ever to go without a single punt, Steve Young, Jim Kelly, and two of the most famous offenses in league history – San Francisco's West Coast offense and Buffalo's K-Gun offense – combined for 1,086 yards and 65 points as a late Niners field goal attempt missed for a 34–31 Bills win. Jerry Rice was knocked out of the game after three catches for 26 yards; Mike Sherrard led the Niners' receiving attack with 159 yards. |Weather= 84 °F or 28.9 °C (Sunny)

==== Week 3: at New York Jets ====
The Niners returned to Giants Stadium and won 31–14 generating 335 yards of offense. Young threw for 163 yards and also rushed for fifty, nearly matching Ricky Watters's 55 yards. The Jets didn't score until the fourth quarter.

==== Week 4: at New Orleans Saints ====
The Saints held the Niners to 333 yards of offense but fumbled twice and Bobby Hebert threw three picks. Steve Young and Ricky Watters accounted for 141 rushing yards as the Niners clawed out a 16–10 win.

==== Week 5: vs. Los Angeles Rams ====
The Niners returned to The Stick and saw a 10–7 grinder explode in the fourth quarter as Robert Bailey picked off Steve Young and scored; Young followed with two rushing scores (and 60 rushing yards total, once again coming close to matching Ricky Watters's game total, here 83 yards) before Jim Everett's nine-yard score to Flipper Anderson tied the game; Mike Cofer then won it (27–24) on a late 21-yard field goal. |Weather= 82 °F or 27.8 °C(Sunny)

==== Week 6: at New England Patriots ====
Despite two fumbles and a Steve Young pick, the Niners manhandled the faltering Patriots 24–12, intercepting Hugh Millen twice and limiting the Patriots to 227 yards of offense. Young and Ricky Watters again were a two-pronged rushing attack with 173 combined yards on the ground.

==== Week 7: vs. Atlanta Falcons ====
The Niners scored five rushing touchdowns, three of them by Watters, and put up 191 rushing yards to go with 399 passing yards from Steve Young in a 56–17 massacre of the Falcons. |Weather= 67 °F or 19.4 °C (Cloudy)

==== Week 9: at Phoenix Cardinals ====
Four years after one of the most frustrating losses of the Bill Walsh era, the Niners again fell to the Cardinals, this time 24–14. Chris Chandler threw three touchdowns and the Cards swallowed four Niners turnovers. The biggest highlight for San Francisco was when Mike Sherrard scored a touchdown after he grabbed the ball from Eric Hill who had recovered a fumble from Brent Jones.

==== Week 10: at Atlanta Falcons ====
The Niners responded to the Phoenix loss by unleashing three Steve Young touchdowns and a Merton Hanks punt return score while picking off Billy Joe Tolliver three times and swallowing three Falcons fumbles in a 41–3 massacre. Deion Sanders had four kick returns for 81 yards for Atlanta.

==== Week 11: vs. New Orleans Saints ====
The Saints picked off Steve Young once and raced to a 20–7 lead, but in the fourth quarter, Young and Brent Jones erased New Orleans's lead on two touchdowns, winning 21–20. |Weather= 64 °F or 17.8 °C (Drizzle)

==== Week 12: at Los Angeles Rams ====
The Niners assault through 1992 continued as they limited the Rams to 245 yards and won 27–10. Ricky Watters erupted to 163 rushing yards and two scores.

==== Week 13: vs. Philadelphia Eagles ====
Despite two Randall Cunningham touchdowns the Eagles fell 20–14 at San Francisco. Steve Young threw for 342 yards and posted the most rushing yards of the game at 26. |Weather= 62 °F or 16.7 °C (Sunny)

==== Week 14: vs. Miami Dolphins ====
Dan Marino was routed once again by the 49ers as they limited him to 192 passing yards and won 27–3. With Watters sidelined, Amp Lee led the rushing attack with 58 yards and a score. |Weather= 55 °F or 12.8 °C (Rain)

==== Week 15: at Minnesota Vikings ====
Both teams combined for just 472 yards of offense as a late Terry Allen score could get the Vikings no closer than a 20–17 Niners win. Amp Lee exploded to 134 rushing yards. As of 2024, this remains the 49ers last win in Minnesota.

==== Week 16: vs. Tampa Bay Buccaneers ====
With Steve Young facing his former team, the game lead tied or changed five times as Jerry Rice's 30-yard touchdown won the game for the Niners 21–14. The game was a clean affair with just five total penalties. |Weather= 51 °F or 10.6 °C (Sunny)

==== Week 17: vs. Detroit Lions ====
Steve Young threw for 153 yards as the Niners clawed to a 7–6 halftime lead; from there Joe Montana came into the game and threw for 126 yards and two touchdowns. |Weather= 51 °F or 10.6 °C (Light rain)

=== Standings ===
NFC West
	W	L	T	PCT	DIV	CONF	PF	PA	STK
^{(1)} San Francisco 49ers	14	2	0	.875	6–0	11–1	431	236	W8
^{(4)} New Orleans Saints	12	4	0	.750	4–2	9–3	330	202	W1
Atlanta Falcons	6	10	0	.375	1–5	4–8	327	414	L2
Los Angeles Rams	6	10	0	.375	1–5	4–8	313	383	W1

=== Best performances ===
- Second Most Total Yards in One 49ers Game, 590 Total Yards (vs. Atlanta Falcons on October 18, 1992)

== Playoffs ==
The 49ers' NFC West division championship and 14–2 regular-season record earned them the first-round bye, the NFC's #1 seed, and home-field advantage throughout the playoffs.

=== Schedule ===
Round	Date	Opponent (seed)	Result	Record	Venue
Wild Card	First-round bye				
Divisional	January 9, 1993	Washington Redskins (6)	W 20–13	1–0	Candlestick Park
NFC Championship	January 17, 1993	Dallas Cowboys (2)	L 20–30	1–1	Candlestick Park

=== Game summaries ===
==== NFC Divisional Playoff: vs. (6) Washington Redskins ====
NFC Divisional Playoff: (6) Washington Redskins at (1) San Francisco 49ers – Game summary

Quarter	1	2	3	4	Total
Redskins	3	0	3	7	13
49ers	10	7	0	3	20

at Candlestick Park

- Date: January 9, 1993
- Game time: 1 p.m. CDT
- Game weather: 51 °F or 10.6 °C (Cloudy), relative humidity 86%, wind 11 mph

Game information

First quarter

- SF – John Taylor 5 yard pass from Steve Young (Mike Cofer kick). 49ers 7–0
- Was – Chip Lohmiller 19 yard field goal. 49ers 7–3

Second quarter

- SF – Mike Cofer 23 yard field goal. 49ers 10–3
- SF – Brent Jones 16 yard pass from Steve Young (Mike Cofer kick). 49ers 17–3

Third quarter

- Was – Chip Lohmiller 32 yard field goal. 49ers 17–6

Fourth quarter

- Was – Mark Rypien 1 yard rush (Chip Lohmiller kick). 49ers 17–13
- SF – Mike Cofer 33 yard field goal. 49ers 20–13

Redskins

- Mark Rypien. 19-40, 270 yards, 0 TD, 2 Int. 1 rushing TD.
- Gary Clark. 7 rec, 100 yards

49ers

- Steve Young. 20-30, 227 yards, 2 TD, 1 Int. 8 rush, 73 yards
- Jerry Rice. 6 rec, 88 yards.

Turnovers

- Redskins – 4
- 49ers – 4

In a rain-plagued, muddy, and sloppily played game, the 49ers defeated the Redskins 20–13. The entire field was covered in mud with resulting play affected. The 49ers took a 17–3 lead at halftime, but trailed off in the second half and the Redskins kept it close. Steve Young was 20 for 30, throwing for 227 yards, but he fumbled three times (following one fumble, 49ers radio analyst Wayne Walker criticized Young's run-heavy playing style, unfavorably contrasting it with erstwhile Niners starter Joe Montana) and threw an interception. Late in the game, the Redskins were at the San Francisco 28-yard line and looking to take their first lead of the game when a hand-off by Redskins quarterback Mark Rypien to running back Brian Mitchell was fumbled and recovered by the 49ers. Both teams committed 4 turnovers each. The 49ers advance to host the NFC Championship Game.

==== NFC Championship: vs. (2) Dallas Cowboys ====
NFC Championship: (2) Dallas Cowboys at (1) San Francisco 49ers – Game summary

Quarter	1	2	3	4	Total
Cowboys	3	7	7	13	30
49ers	7	3	3	7	20

at Candlestick Park

- Date: January 17, 1993
- Game time: 1 p.m. CDT
- Game weather: 52 °F or 11.1 °C (Light Rain), relative humidity 88%, wind 7 mph

Game information

First quarter

- Dal – Lin Elliott 20 yard field goal. Cowboys 3–0
- SF – Steve Young 1 yard rush (Mike Cofer kick). 49ers 7–3

Second quarter

- Dal – Emmitt Smith 5 yard rush (Lin Elliott kick). Cowboys 10–7
- SF – Mike Cofer 28 yard field goal. Tie 10–10

Third quarter

- Dal – Daryl Johnston 4 yard rush (Lin Elliott kick). Cowboys 17–10
- SF – Mike Cofer 42 yard field goal. Cowboys 17–13

Fourth quarter

- Dal – Emmitt Smith 16 yard pass from Troy Aikman (Lin Elliott kick). Cowboys 24–13
- SF – Jerry Rice 5 yard pass from Steve Young (Mike Cofer kick). Cowboys 24–20
- Dal – Kelvin Martin 6 yard pass from Troy Aikman (kick failed). Cowboys 30–20

Cowboys

- Troy Aikman. 24–34, 322 yards, 2 TD, 0 Int
- Emmitt Smith. 24 rush, 114 yards. 7 rec, 59 yards, 1 TD

49ers

- Steve Young. 25–35, 313 yards, 1 TD, 2 Int
- Jerry Rice. 8 rec, 123 yards, 1 TD

Turnovers

- Cowboys – 0
- 49ers – 4

The 49ers, who struggled the previous week, did not look much better in this game as they had four turnovers while the Cowboys had none. Even with the turnovers the Niners clawed to within 24–20 on a five-yard Jerry Rice touchdown catch, but on the ensuing Cowboys' possession a 70-yard catch and run by Alvin Harper set up Troy Aikman's touchdown pass to Kelvin Martin, sealing the Cowboys' win. In all, the 49ers had eight turnovers in their two playoff games. Young finished the playoffs with a passer rating of 91.0.

== Awards and records ==
- Franchise Record, Most Points in One Game, 56 Points (vs. Atlanta Falcons on October 18, 1992)
- Franchise Record, Most Total Yards in One Game, 598 Total Yards (vs. Buffalo Bills on September 13, 1992)
- Led NFL, Points Scored, 431 Points
- Steve Young, Led NFL, Passer Rating, 107.0 Rating
- Steve Young, Led NFL, Touchdown Passes, 25 Passes
- Steve Young, Bert Bell Award
- Steve Young, Miller Lite Player of the Year
- Steve Young, NFL MVP
