= Todd Peat =

American football player (born 1964)

No. 64, 69
- Positions: Guard, tackle

Personal information
- Born: May 20, 1964 (age 62); Champaign, Illinois, U.S.
- Listed height: 6 ft 2 in (1.88 m)
- Listed weight: 294 lb (133 kg)

Career information
- High school: Champaign (IL) Central
- College: Northern Illinois
- NFL draft: 1987: 11th round, 285th overall pick

Career history
- St. Louis/Phoenix Cardinals (1987–1989); Buffalo Bills (1989); Los Angeles Raiders (1990, 1992–1993); Houston Oilers (1994)*; Frankfurt Galaxy (1995)
- * Offseason or practice squad member only

Awards and highlights
- PFWA All-Rookie Team (1987); World Bowl champion (III); Third-team All-American (1986)

Career NFL statistics
- Games played: 79
- Games started: 36
- Stats at Pro Football Reference

Marion Todd Peat Sr. (born May 20, 1964) is an American former professional football player who was an offensive lineman in the National Football League (NFL). He played six seasons for the St. Louis/Phoenix Cardinals (1987–1989) and the Los Angeles Raiders (1990, 1992–1993).

Pre-draft measurables
Height	Weight	Arm length	Hand span	40-yard dash	10-yard split	20-yard split	20-yard shuttle	Vertical jump	Broad jump	Bench press
6 ft 2 in (1.88 m)	294 lb (133 kg)	31 1/2 in (0.80 m)	10 in (0.25 m)	5.37 s	1.76 s	3.12 s	4.92 s	26.0 in (0.66 m)	8 ft 4 in (2.54 m)	18 reps
All values from NFL Combine

Peat was selected by the Cardinals in the 11th round of the 1987 NFL draft with the 285th overall pick. He also played for Frankfurt Galaxy in the World League of American Football (WLAF) in (1995).

Peat has seven children. His oldest son, Todd, played defensive tackle for Nebraska, Eastern Arizona College, and Texas A&M–Commerce. Andrus was picked 13th overall in the 2015 NFL draft by the New Orleans Saints and Cassius played college football for Scottsdale Community College.

His younger son, Keona, is a lineman on the Arizona State Sun Devils football team, and Koa is a professional basketball player for the Phoenix Suns.

His daughter Leilani plays women's college basketball for the Seattle Redhawks, while Maya currently plays for Texas Tech.
