= Shawn Collins =

American gridiron football player (born 1967)

No. 85, 80, 81, 82, 89
- Position: Wide receiver

Personal information
- Born: February 20, 1967 (age 59); San Diego, California, U.S.
- Listed height: 6 ft 2 in (1.88 m)
- Listed weight: 207 lb (94 kg)

Career information
- High school: Kearny (San Diego)
- College: Northern Arizona
- NFL draft: 1989: 1st round, 27th overall pick

Career history
- Atlanta Falcons (1989–1992); Cleveland Browns (1992); Green Bay Packers (1993); Tampa Bay Buccaneers (1993)*; Memphis Mad Dogs (1995); Winnipeg Blue Bombers (1995); Frankfurt Galaxy (1995); Iowa Barnstormers (1997)
- * Offseason or practice squad member only

Awards and highlights
- PFWA All-Rookie Team (1989); World Bowl champion (III)

Career NFL statistics
- Receptions: 98
- Receiving yards: 1,433
- Touchdowns: 5
- Stats at Pro Football Reference

Career AFL statistics
- Receptions: 5
- Receiving yards: 52
- Tackles: 3
- Rushing touchdowns: 1
- Stats at ArenaFan.com

Shawn Collins (born February 20, 1967) is an American former professional football player who was a wide receiver in the National Football League (NFL). He was selected by the Atlanta Falcons in the first round of the 1989 NFL draft with the 27th overall pick. He played college football for the Northern Arizona Lumberjacks.

Collins also played for the Cleveland Browns, Green Bay Packers and Frankfurt Galaxy. He played in the Canadian Football League in 1995 for the Winnipeg Blue Bombers and the Memphis Mad Dogs.
