= Kevin Williams (running back) =

American football player (1970–2012)

No. 20, 43
- Position: Running back

Personal information
- Born: February 17, 1970; Marshall, Texas, U.S.
- Died: December 18, 2012 (aged 42); Houston, Texas, U.S.
- Listed height: 6 ft 0 in (1.83 m)
- Listed weight: 215 lb (98 kg)

Career information
- High school: Spring (Spring, Texas)
- College: UCLA
- NFL draft: 1993: 5th round, 126th overall pick

Career history
- Denver Broncos (1993)*; Green Bay Packers (1993–1994); Frankfurt Galaxy (1995–1996)
- * Offseason or practice squad member only

Awards and highlights
- World Bowl champion (1995); Second-team All-Pac-10 (1991)
- Stats at Pro Football Reference

Kevin Deleon Williams (February 17, 1970 – December 18, 2012) was an American professional football player who was a running back in the National Football League (NFL). He played college football for the UCLA Bruins and was selected in the fifth round of the 1993 NFL draft.

== Career ==
Williams attended Spring High School in Spring, Texas, near Houston, and was considered the nation's top high school running back in 1987. He chose to leave Texas and attend the University of California, Los Angeles. In his first season with the Bruins in 1989, he had a respectable season averaging 4.5 yards per carry and ranking fifth in the Pac-10 in kickoff returns. Troubled by ankle and back problems in 1990, he played in just three games, gaining 112 yards in 27 carries. Williams ran for 132 yards in UCLA's season opener in 1991 against BYU. He finished the season as the Pac-10's leading rusher with 1,089 yards.

Pre-draft measurables
Height	Weight	Arm length	Hand span	40-yard dash	10-yard split	20-yard split	20-yard shuttle	Vertical jump	Broad jump	Bench press
6 ft 0 1/2 in (1.84 m)	212 lb (96 kg)	32 7/8 in (0.84 m)	8 7/8 in (0.23 m)	4.44 s	1.59 s	2.58 s	4.11 s	41.5 in (1.05 m)	11 ft 5 in (3.48 m)	17 reps

Williams was drafted in the fifth round of the 1993 NFL draft (126th overall) by the Denver Broncos, but did not make the team. He would spend the 1993 NFL season with the Green Bay Packers.
