= Steve Stonebreaker =

American football player (1938–1995)

No. 82, 31, 37
- Positions: Tight end, linebacker

Personal information
- Born: October 28, 1938; Moline, Illinois, U.S.
- Died: March 28, 1995 (aged 56); Metairie, Louisiana, U.S.
- Listed height: 6 ft 3 in (1.91 m)
- Listed weight: 235 lb (107 kg)

Career information
- High school: Utica (MI)
- College: Detroit Mercy (1958-1961)
- NFL draft: 1961: 12th round, 155th overall pick
- AFL draft: 1962: 34th round, 266th overall pick

Career history
- Minnesota Vikings (1962–1963); Baltimore Colts (1964–1966); New Orleans Saints (1967–1968)

Career NFL statistics
- Interceptions: 2
- Fumble recoveries: 7
- Receptions: 12
- Receiving yards: 227
- Total touchdowns: 2
- Stats at Pro Football Reference

Thornton Steve Stonebreaker (October 28, 1938 – March 28, 1995) was a professional American football linebacker who played in the National Football League (NFL). He played college football for the Detroit Titans and was picked by the Minnesota Vikings in the 12th round of the 1961 NFL draft as a tight end. He played one season at tight end before switching over to the defensive side of the ball as a linebacker for the rest of his career. He played a total of seven seasons in the NFL for the Minnesota Vikings (1962–1963), the Baltimore Colts (1964–1966), and the New Orleans Saints (1967–1968). He was drafted by the Saints in the 1967 NFL expansion draft and was one of the original New Orleans Saints players. He also played a football player in the 1969 Charlton Heston movie Number One, which featured the New Orleans Saints.

During his professional career, Stonebreaker played all 14 games each year except for 1966 and 1967, when he played only 4 and 10 games, respectively. He played in the 1964 NFL Championship Game as a member of the 12–2 Baltimore Colts but lost 27–0 to Cleveland Browns.

After he retired from football, Stonebreaker had several jobs including serving as a New Orleans Saints color commentator for WWL Radio from 1973 to 1975. He later opened a restaurant called Stonebreaker's at 2700 Edenborn Avenue in Metairie, a close suburb of New Orleans. Stonebreaker's specialties were barbecue baby back pork ribs and crab cakes, which he learned to make when he played for the Baltimore Colts. The interior decor of the restaurant was NFL memorabilia. The restaurant, which was in financial trouble, closed shortly after Stonebreaker's death in 1995.

== Family and death ==
Stonebreaker's son Mike graduated from Notre Dame University and played professional football for three years. He was with the Chicago Bears in 1991 and then the New Orleans Saints in 1994. He won an NFL Europe (WLAF, World League) championship with the Frankfurt Galaxy in World Bowl '95.

Steve and Mike are one of only four father/son duos to have both played for the New Orleans Saints.

Stonebreaker died on March 28, 1995, at the age of 56, an apparent suicide as he was found on the floor next to his car exhaust in his garage.
