= Mike Stonebreaker =

American football player (born 1967)

No. 58, 52, 54
- Position: Linebacker

Personal information
- Born: January 14, 1967 (age 59); Baltimore, Maryland, U.S.
- Listed height: 6 ft 0 in (1.83 m)
- Listed weight: 226 lb (103 kg)

Career information
- High school: John Curtis Christian (River Ridge, Louisiana)
- College: Notre Dame
- NFL draft: 1991: 9th round, 245th overall pick

Career history
- Chicago Bears (1991); Atlanta Falcons (1993)*; New Orleans Saints (1994); Los Angeles Rams (1995)*; Frankfurt Galaxy (1995)
- * Offseason or practice squad member only

Awards and highlights
- World Bowl champion (III); First-team All-World League (1995); Unanimous All-American (1990); Consensus All-American (1988)

Career NFL statistics
- Tackles: 8
- Stats at Pro Football Reference
- College Football Hall of Fame

Michael David Stonebreaker (born January 14, 1967) is an American former professional football player who was a linebacker in the National Football League (NFL) for two seasons for the Chicago Bears and New Orleans Saints. He played college football for the Notre Dame Fighting Irish, earning consensus All-American honors twice. He was selected in the ninth round of the 1991 NFL draft with the 245th overall pick by the Bears.

Played high school football at John Curtis Christian High School in River Ridge, Louisiana and graduated in 1986. Finished third in balloting for the Butkus Award in 1988 and 1990 during his career at Notre Dame (1986–1990). His father, Steve Stonebreaker, also played in the NFL. Michael is a member of College Football Hall of Fame, having been admitted in 2023, becoming the 49th Notre Dame player to make the Hall, which is the most of any school.
