= David Wilkins =

David Wilkins may refer to:

- David H. Wilkins (born 1946), American politician and ambassador
- David Wilkins (sailor) (born 1950), Irish sailor
- David Wilkins (orientalist) (1685–1745), Prussian orientalist
- David Wilkins (American football) (born 1969), American football player
- David B. Wilkins (born 1956), American law professor
- David E. Wilkins, Lumbee political scientist and scholar of Native politics
- Dave Wilkins (1914–1990), jazz trumpeter from Barbados
- Little David Wilkins (born 1940), American country singer-songwriter
