= Cecil Doggette =

American football player (born 1970)

No. 6
- Position: Defensive specialist

Personal information
- Born: November 15, 1970 (age 55); Queens, New York, U.S.
- Listed height: 5 ft 8 in (1.73 m)
- Listed weight: 180 lb (82 kg)

Career information
- High school: Bayside (New York City)
- College: West Virginia
- NFL draft: 1992: undrafted

Career history
- San Diego Chargers (1992)*; Detroit Drive (1993); New York Jets (1994)*; Frankfurt Galaxy (1995–1997); Dallas Cowboys (1996)*; Buffalo Bills (1998)*; Arizona Rattlers (1995, 1997–2002); Grand Rapids Rampage (2003–2005); Columbus Destroyers (2006)
- * Offseason or practice squad member only

Awards and highlights
- ArenaBowl champion (1997); 2× First-team All-Arena - DS (1999, 2002); AFL second-team 15th Anniversary Team (2001); World Bowl champion (1995)

Career AFL statistics
- Tackles: 490
- Interceptions: 29
- Passes broken-up: 151
- Forced fumbles: 11
- Fumble recoveries: 9
- Stats at ArenaFan.com

Cecil Doggette (born November 15, 1970) is an American former professional football player who was a defensive specialist in the Arena Football League (AFL). He played college football at Hudson Valley Community College and West Virginia.

== Early life ==
Doggette attended Bayside High School in Queens and was a standout in football and track.

== College career ==
Doggette first attended Hudson Valley Community College in Troy, New York. He then transferred to West Virginia University where he was a two-year starter.

In 1990, Doggette's first season at West Virginia, he recorded 22 tackles. He also forced two fumbles and recovered another. In 1991, he broke the school single-season record of pass break-ups with nine in the first three games of the season. He finished the season with 29 tackles.

== Professional career ==
=== National Football League (1992) ===
Doggette went unselected in the 1992 NFL draft, however, he was signed by the San Diego Chargers.

=== Arena Football League (1993) ===
After his stint with the San Diego Chargers, Doggette left the NFL joined the Arena Football League. He signed with the Detroit Drive, where he played five games, recording 6.5 tackles and one interception. He also played a playoff game, recording 3.5 tackles.

=== NFL (1994) / WLAF (1995–1997) ===
After the 1993 season, Doggette signed a one-year contract with the New York Jets in 1994. In 1995, the Jets allocated him to the Frankfurt Galaxy of the World League. He helped Frankfurt win the World Bowl Championship that season as the special teams MVP.

In 1996, Doggette attended training camp with the Dallas Cowboys, but returned to the Galaxy for the 1996 season instead. He finished the season with 40 tackles, 12 pass break-ups and four interceptions. In 1998, Doggette was signed to the practice squad of the Buffalo Bills.

=== Return to the Arena Football League ===
On June 28, 1995, Doggette signed with the Arizona Rattlers of the Arena Football League, after the NFL Europe season ended. He played in only four games, in 1995 but recorded 17.5 tackles and three pass break-ups. He left the Rattlers after the 1995 season to return to the NFL Europe for the 1996 season.

=== Final season in the World Leaguge ===
After the 1997 season, Doggette left the Galaxy, when he was named All-World League for the consecutive season. He set a single-game record with six pass break-ups against the London Monarchs that season.

He finished his Galaxy career second on the all-time career list with 29 pass break-ups and single-season with 14 break-ups.

=== Full-time Arena Football League player ===
==== Arizona Rattlers ====
In week seven of the 1997 season, Doggette performed well in the playoffs, recording 18.5 tackles and eight pass break-ups. In the ArenaBowl XI, he recorded four tackles against the Iowa Blackhawks. In 1998, he played in all fourteen games of the season. He led the Rattlers with 50 tackles and 19 pass break-ups. He also recorded two interceptions and fumble recoveries. In the playoffs, he recorded 3.5 tackles, an interception, a forced fumble, a fumble recovery, and four pass break-ups. After the season, he signed with the Buffalo Bills practice squad.

In 1999, Doggette finished the season by being named All-Arena. He led the team with 54 tackles, 16 pass break-ups, and six interceptions on the season. His six interceptions were second in the league. In two playoff games, Doggette recorded 12.5 tackles and five pass break-ups. Then, in 2000, he again led the team in tackles with 66, pass break-ups with 23, and interceptions with four. He also had four forced fumbles and one recovery. In three playoff games, he recorded 16 tackles, two pass break-ups and an interception.

For the 2001 season, he led the team with 61 tackles and five interceptions. He also had 13 pass break-ups, and nine tackles and three pass break-ups in the playoffs. On March 25, 2002, Doggette re-signed with the Rattlers. In 2002 season, he only played 10 games, but still earned second-team All-Arena honors after recording team-highs 56 tackles, three interceptions, and 15 pass break-ups. It would be the fifth consecutive season that Doggette led his respective team in tackles. He recorded 12 tackles, four pass break-ups, and an interception in the playoffs, up to the ArenaBowl XVI loss.

==== Grand Rapids Rampage ====
After the 2002 season Doggette signed with the Grand Rapids Rampage. In 2003, he led the team in tackles for the sixth consecutive season. His 64.5 tackles ranked as the third most in Rampage history. He also recorded four interceptions, returning one for his lone career touchdown, and 13 pass break-ups.

Doggette's 2004 season was the best statistical season of his career. He set career-highs with 76 tackles and 29 pass break-ups, leading the league in both categories. His season pass break-ups were the fourth most all-time in league single-season history. His tackles were also a Rampage record and became the franchise leader in tackles (141.5) and pass break-ups (43). He also became the all-time AFL career leader in pass break-ups on May 22, against the Carolina Cobras with 136 in his career. He finished the season by being named All-Arena and being named Defensive Player of the Game four times throughout the season. In 2005, his last season with the Rampage, he totaled 29 tackles and nine pass break-ups.

==== Columbus Destroyers ====
In 2006, Doggette played his final season with the Columbus Destroyers. He finished the season second on the team in tackles with 63 and pass break-ups with 10, also recording an interception. In the final home game of his career, he set a season-high 14 tackles against the Tampa Bay Storm. In the final game of his career, he totaled six tackles, one pass break-up, and a fumble recovery. Doggette announced his retirement on May 1, at the conclusion of the season.

==== NFL Youth Flag Football ====
In the fall of 2008 Doggette embarked on a new venture. He started the Ohio Youth Flag Football Association (NFL OHIO) now named GameTime SportZ. GameTime SportZ now services families in Ohio, Indiana and Virginia.

== Personal life ==
Cecil is married to former West Virginia University gymnast, Becky Doggette (née Morrison). The couple have four children, Brooklyn (b. 1994), Sydney or known as 'Makarri' (b. 2000), Jayla (b. 1997) and Cecil 'CJ' (b. 2004).

The family reside in Pickerington, Ohio.
