= Clarence Williams (tight end) =

American football player (born 1969)

No. 49, 88
- Position: Tight end / Running back

Personal information
- Born: August 7, 1969 (age 57); Los Angeles, California, U.S.
- Listed height: 6 ft 2 in (1.88 m)
- Listed weight: 240 lb (109 kg)

Career information
- High school: Renton (WA)
- College: Washington State
- NFL draft: 1993: 7th round, 169 (By the Denver Broncos)th overall pick

Career history
- Denver Broncos (1993)*; Cleveland Browns (1993); Frankfurt Galaxy (1995)
- * Offseason or practice squad member only

Awards and highlights
- World Bowl champion (1995); 3× First-team All-Pac-10 (1990, 1991, 1992)

Career NFL statistics
- Games played: 7
- Games started: 1
- Receptions: 1
- Receiving yards: 14
- Touchdowns: 0
- Stats at Pro Football Reference

Clarence Williams III (born August 7, 1969) is an American former professional football player who was a tight end and running back for the Cleveland Browns of the National Football League (NFL). He played college football for the Washington State Cougars and was selected by the Denver Broncos in the seventh round of the 1993 NFL draft with the 169th overall pick.

His father was defensive back Clarence "Clancy" Williams (1942–1986), an All-American at Washington State University who played eight seasons in the NFL with the Los Angeles Rams from 1965 through 1972.

Like his father, Clarence III played high school football at Renton and college football at Washington State in Pullman. He was selected in the seventh round (169th overall) of the 1993 NFL draft by the Denver Broncos.

Williams also played for the Frankfurt Galaxy in the World League of American Football. In 2013, he was voted the greatest tight end in Washington State University history by the editors of Cougfan.com. Williams concluded his WSU career with the tight ends record for catches (95) and yards (1,263). He was named first-team all-Pac-10 three straight seasons, 1990–92.
