= Nathaniel Bolton =

American gridiron football player (born 1968)

No. 7, 88
- Position: Running back / Wide receiver

Personal information
- Born: July 1, 1968 (age 58); Mobile, Alabama

Career information
- College: Mississippi College
- NFL draft: 1991: undrafted

Career history
- Cleveland Browns (1991)*; New Orleans Saints (1991, 1992)*; Winnipeg Blue Bombers (1993–1994); Frankfurt Galaxy (1995); Atlanta Falcons (1995)*; Frankfurt Galaxy (1996)
- * Offseason or practice squad member only

Awards and highlights
- 2× First team All-GSC (1989, 1990); GSC Team of the Quarter Century (1996); World Bowl champion (1995)

Career CFL statistics
- Games played: 15
- Receiving yards: 789
- Kick return yards: 518
- Punt return yards: 340
- Touchdowns: 6

Nathaniel Bolton (born July 1, 1968) is a former professional American and Canadian football player in the Canadian Football League (CFL) and World League of American Football (WLAF). During his career he played wide receiver for the Winnipeg Blue Bombers of the CFL, and running back for the Frankfurt Galaxy of the WLAF, winning a World Bowl championship in 1995. Bolton played collegiately for Mississippi College.

== Early years and college career ==
Bolton was born in Mobile, Alabama, as the 18th of 20 children, and grew up in McLain, Mississippi.

Bolton went on to attend Mississippi College in Clinton, Mississippi, where he played college football from 1987 to 1990. Back then, the Choctaws were competing at the NCAA Division II level and won the National Championship in 1989 against Jacksonville State. Bolton contributed with 62 receptions (a school record) for 1,012 yards and 11 touchdowns. He was named Gulf South Conference (GSC) offensive player of the week twice that year and earned first team all-conference honors while leading the GSC in points scored with 90. However, Mississippi College's football tournament participation, along with its NCAA Division II national football championship, were later vacated by the NCAA Committee on infractions for recruiting violations. He finished his collegiate career ranked second in school history with 129 receptions, fourth with 1,733 receiving yards, and first with 19 touchdown receptions. In August 1996, Bolton was named to the GSC Team of the Quarter Century (1971–1995).

== Professional career ==
Bolton went unselected in the 1991 NFL draft and signed as a free agent with the Cleveland Browns.
