= Jocelyn Borgella =

American football player (born 1971)

No. 28, 27
- Position: Defensive back

Personal information
- Born: August 26, 1971 (age 55); Nassau, The Bahamas
- Listed height: 5 ft 10 in (1.78 m)
- Listed weight: 180 lb (82 kg)

Career information
- High school: Edison (Miami, Florida, U.S.)
- College: Cincinnati (1990–1993)
- NFL draft: 1994: 6th round, 183rd overall pick

Career history
- Detroit Lions (1994–1996); → Scottish Claymores (1995); Cincinnati Bengals (1997)*; Winnipeg Blue Bombers (1997); BC Lions (1998); Montreal Alouettes (1998)*; Tampa Bay Storm (1999)*; Winnipeg Blue Bombers (1999)*; Hamilton Tiger-Cats (2000)*; Grand Rapids Rampage (2001)*
- * Offseason or practice squad member only

Career NFL statistics
- Games played: 15
- Stats at Pro Football Reference

Jocelyn Kenza Borgella (born August 26, 1971) is an American former professional football player who was a defensive back in the National Football League (NFL). Born in The Bahamas and of Haitian descent, he moved to the U.S. at age three and grew up in Florida. After playing football at Miami Edison High School, he was a four-year starter for the Cincinnati Bearcats in college and led the nation in interception return yards as a junior. He was selected by the Detroit Lions in the sixth round of the 1994 NFL draft, becoming the first Haitian to be drafted into the NFL and later the first to play in a game. He played with the Lions in 1994 and 1996 and with the Scottish Claymores of the World League of American Football in 1995. After a brief stint with the Cincinnati Bengals in 1997, he played for the Winnipeg Blue Bombers and BC Lions of the Canadian Football League (CFL) in 1997 to 1998. He was also a member of the Montreal Alouettes and Hamilton Tiger-Cats in the CFL as well as had stints in the Arena Football League with the Tampa Bay Storm and Grand Rapids Rampage.

== Early life ==
Borgella was born on August 26, 1971, in Nassau, The Bahamas, the oldest of four children. His parents were both from Haiti and had moved to The Bahamas for job opportunities. In 1974, at age three, his family moved to Little Haiti in Miami, Florida.

Borgella began playing organized football at age 14 for a local team. He attended Miami Edison High School where he competed in football and track and field. In football, he was a starter at defensive back all four years and earned All-Dade County honors as a senior. He helped the track team win the Greater Miami championship. Borgella had interest from a number of top college football teams, although many lost interest due to his lateness in completing college entrance exams. He signed to play in college for the Cincinnati Bearcats and was described by The Cincinnati Enquirer as one of the "gems" of their recruiting class.

== College career ==
At the University of Cincinnati, Borgella studied criminal justice. Standing at 5 feet 11 inches (1.80 m) and weighing 180 pounds (82 kg), he won a starting role at cornerback as a true freshman for the Bearcats in 1990. He played all 11 games in 1990. He remained a starter for all four years he attended Cincinnati and coach Tim Murphy called him "probably our best player" in 1993. He started 10 games in 1991 and then every game during the 1992 and 1993 seasons, earning four Player of the Week honors from coaches during his collegiate career. Borgella recorded three interceptions for 34 yards in 1991 before having five interceptions for 171 yards in 1992; his 171 interception return yards was the best mark nationally. He then recorded four interceptions for 58 yards as a senior in 1993, helping the Bearcats compile a record of 8–3. He concluded his collegiate career with 12 interceptions for 263 yards, setting Cincinnati's career interceptions record. The first in his family to attend college, Borgella graduated with a bachelor's degree in criminal justice.

== Professional career ==
Borgella was selected by the Detroit Lions in the sixth round (183rd overall) of the 1994 NFL draft. He became the first Haitian to be selected in the NFL draft. The Miami Herald reported that his selection served as an inspiration to others in Little Haiti, and the football coach at Edison High School said that "Him getting drafted has lifted our program. When I came here three years ago, I don't think the Haitian athletes felt there was a light at the end of the tunnel". He also became the first Haitian to make an NFL roster later that year. After spending the first seven games of his career on the Lions' inactive list, he debuted against the New York Giants that year and posted two tackles while appearing on special teams. He appeared in the next three games as well before being inactive for the rest of the year. In his rookie year with the Lions, Borgella participated in a relief effort benefiting Haitian refugee children, donating toys and clothes. In 1995, he was sent to the Scottish Claymores of the World League of American Football to "get more playing experience". With the Claymores, Borgella posted three interceptions, although he suffered a sprained knee playing for them. He did not appear in any games for the Lions during the 1995 NFL season.

Borgella returned to the Lions in 1996 and appeared in 11 games, appearing mainly on special teams. He recorded six tackles – four on special teams and two on defense. Borgella saw his first playing time at cornerback in a game against the New York Giants in which he forced a fumble. He also recovered an onside kick against the Green Bay Packers. He was not offered a tender by the Lions in 1997 and thus became a free agent.

On March 25, 1997, Borgella signed with the Cincinnati Bengals, later being released on August 10. He signed with the Winnipeg Blue Bombers of the Canadian Football League on August 27 and appeared in five games for them that year, posting 31 tackles, an interception and four passes deflected; he also scored a two-point conversion on a 112-yard return. He was traded to the BC Lions prior to the 1998 season and changed his position to linebacker there. Borgella played in eight games for the Lions and was their leading tackler with 51 tackles before being released in September, which he said "caught me off-guard. I was really surprised". Following his release from the Lions, he joined the practice roster of the Montreal Alouettes. After a brief stint with the Tampa Bay Storm of the Arena Football League (AFL) in 1999, he signed with the Blue Bombers that March as a defensive back. He was later released during the team's training camp. He signed with the Hamilton Tiger-Cats in May 2000, but was released the following month. He was also briefly a member of the AFL's Grand Rapids Rampage in 2001.

== Personal life ==
Borgella married his wife, Katina Scott, a year after he graduated from high school. As of 1998, they had three children together. His son, Jocelyn Jr., played college football for the Bethune–Cookman Wildcats and later served as a coach.
