= 1995 Barcelona Dragons season =

World League of American Football team season

1995 Barcelona Dragons (NFL Europe) season
- General manager: Jordi Vila-Puig
- Head coach: Jack Bicknell
- Home stadium: Estadi Olímpic de Montjuïc

Results
- Record: 5–5
- Division place: 3rd
- Playoffs: Did not qualify

The 1995 Barcelona Dragons season was the third season for the franchise in the World League of American Football (WLAF). The team was led by head coach Jack Bicknell in his third year, and played its home games at Estadi Olímpic de Montjuïc in Barcelona, Catalonia, Spain. They finished the regular season in third place with a record of five wins and five losses.

== Offseason ==
=== World League draft ===
1995 Barcelona Dragons World League draft selections
Draft order		Player name	Position	College
Round	Choice	Player name	Position	College
1		Chuckie Johnson	DT	Auburn
2		Lindsey Chapman	RB	California
3		George Rooks	NT	Syracuse
4		Willie Wright	TE	Wyoming
5		Mike Middleton	CB	Indiana
6		Michael Wright	CB	Washington State
7		Mohammed Elewonibi	G	Brigham Young
8		Mike Anderson	LB	Nebraska
9		Ed King	G	Auburn
10		Tracy Smith	CB	Tennessee
11		Tommy Thigpen	LB	North Carolina
12		Tim Kalal	P/K	Miami (FL)
13		Chuck Bradley	T	Kentucky
14		Eric Lindstrom	LB	Boston College
15		Robert Jackson	WR	Central State (OH)
16		Kelvin Knight	S	Mississippi State
17		Eddie Blake	G	Auburn
18		Chris Crooms	S	Texas A&M
19		Bo Robinson	DE	Texas
20		Sean Thomas	S	Duke
21		Joey Mickey	TE	Oklahoma
22		Christopher Perez	T	Kansas
23		James Spencer	DE	Syracuse
24		Shelby Hill	WR	Syracuse
25		Kevin O'Brien	LB	Bowling Green
26		Tyler Anderson	WR	Brigham Young
27		Juan Long	LB	Mississippi State
28		Charles Thompson	RB	Central State (OH)
29		Eric Turner	S	East Texas State
30		Louis Age	T	Southwestern Louisiana
31		Anthony Hamlet	DE	Miami (FL)
32		Ron Redell	S	Stanford
33		William Houston	FB	Ohio State
34		Joe Johnson	LB	Texas A&M
35		Mark Staten	DT	Miami (OH)
36		Ken Alexander	LB	Florida State
37		Tony Sacca	QB	Penn State
38		Steve Bryant	LB	Nevada
39		Alphonso Taylor	DT	Temple
40		Charlie Young	RB	Stanford
41		Tommy Holliday	G	Southern
42		Troy Dickey	WR	Arizona
43		Craig Fayak	K	Penn State
44		Victor Hall	TE	Auburn
45		Todd Farrell	CB	Boston University

=== NFL allocations ===
Player name	Position	College	NFL team
Tyree Davis	WR	Central Arkansas	Tampa Bay Buccaneers
Mario Henry	WR	Rutgers	New England Patriots
Andy McCollum	C	Toledo	New Orleans Saints
Keith Traylor	DE	Central State (OK)	Kansas City Chiefs
Jay Walker	QB	Howard	New England Patriots
Casey Weldon	QB	Florida State	Tampa Bay Buccaneers

== Personnel ==
=== Staff ===
1995 Barcelona Dragons (NFL Europe) staff
Front office: General Manager – Jordi Vila-Puig; Head coaches: Head Coach – Jack Bicknell; Offensive coaches: Offensive Coordinator/Quarterbacks/Wide Receivers – Dick Curl; Offensive Line – Vince Martino	Defensive coaches: Defensive Coordinator/Linebackers – Red Kelin; Defensive Line – Sam Clancy; Defensive Backs – Chip Beake

=== Roster ===
1995 Barcelona Dragons final roster
Quarterbacks: 19 Tony Sacca; 7 Jay Walker; 3 Casey Weldon; Running backs: 26 Ricky Blake; 33 Lindsey Chapman; 34 Joe Mickles; 24 Charles Thompson; Wide receivers: 82 Tyree Davis; 80 Mario Henry; 12 Shelby Hill; Tight ends: 85 Demetrius Davis; 88 Joey Mickey	Offensive linemen: 57 Louis Age T; 62 Raymond Batiste G; 76 Chuck Bradley T; 67 Mo Elewonibi G; 64 Ed King G; 55 Andy McCollum C; 77 Chris Perez T; Defensive linemen: 90 Byron Bonds DE; 98 Victor Hall DE; 99 Chuckie Johnson NT; 96 Mokie Simon NT; 75 Keith Traylor DE	Linebackers: 52 Ken Alexander ILB; 54 Joe Johnson OLB; 50 Eric Lindstrom OLB; 59 Juan Long ILB; 91 Kevin O'Brien OLB; 51 Tommy Thigpen ILB; Defensive backs: 25 Chris Crooms S; 27 Todd Farrell CB; 22 Mike Middleton S; 21 Tracy Smith CB; 20 Sean Thomas S; 28 Eric Turner CB; Special teams: 1 Jeff Anderson K; 6 Scott Szeredy K/P	National players: 31 (Spain) Pau Coll S; 74 (Germany) Vladimir Ilic DE; 66 (Spain) Ivan Imbernon DE; 83 (Spain) Pedro Garau WR; 23 (France) Thibault Giroud RB; 86 (Mexico) Xisco Marcos WR; Rookies in italics

== Schedule ==
Week	Date	Kickoff (Note: All times local to where the game was played.)	Opponent	Results		Game site	Attendance
Week	Date	Kickoff	Opponent	Final score	Team record	Game site	Attendance
1	Saturday, April 8	7:00 p.m.	at Amsterdam Admirals	L 13–17	0–1	Olympisch Stadion	7,168
2	Monday, April 17	4:00 p.m.	Scottish Claymores	W 10–7	1–1	Estadi Olímpic de Montjuïc	16,500
3	Saturday, April 22	5:30 p.m.	Rhein Fire	W 32–30	2–1	Estadi Olímpic de Montjuïc	17,900
4	Sunday, April 30	3:00 p.m.	at London Monarchs	W 39–24	3–1	White Hart Lane	10,287
5	Saturday, May 6	7:00 p.m.	at Frankfurt Galaxy	L 20–24	3–2	Waldstadion	30,598
6	Saturday, May 13	5:30 p.m.	Amsterdam Admirals	L 34–40 ^{OT}	3–3	Estadi Olímpic de Montjuïc	18,369
7	Saturday, May 20	7:00 p.m.	London Monarchs	L 22–27	3–4	Estadi Olímpic de Montjuïc	18,850
8	Saturday, May 27	7:00 p.m.	at Scottish Claymores	W 16–13	4–4	Murrayfield Stadium	7,523
9	Saturday, June 3	7:00 p.m.	at Rhein Fire	W 31–21	5–4	Rheinstadion	12,323
10	Saturday, June 10	5:30 p.m.	Frankfurt Galaxy	L 20–44	5–5	Estadi Olímpic de Montjuïc	21,380

== Standings ==
World League of American Football
Team	W	L	T	PCT	PF	PA	Home	Road	STK
Amsterdam Admirals	9	1	0	.900	246	152	5–0	4–1	W2
Frankfurt Galaxy	6	4	0	.600	279	202	3–2	3–2	W3
Barcelona Dragons	5	5	0	.500	237	247	2–3	3–2	L1
London Monarchs	4	6	0	.400	174	220	1–4	3–2	L2
Rhein Fire	4	6	0	.400	221	279	2–3	2–3	L3
Scottish Claymores	2	8	0	.200	153	210	0–5	2–3	W1

== Game summaries ==
=== Week 1: at Amsterdam Admirals ===
Week One: Barcelona Dragons at Amsterdam Admirals – Game summary

Quarter	1	2	3	4	Total
Barcelona	0	3	7	3	13
Amsterdam	7	10	0	0	17

at Olympisch Stadion, Amsterdam, Netherlands

- Date: Saturday, April 8
- Game time: 7:00 p.m. CEST
- Game attendance: 7,168

=== Week 6: vs Amsterdam Admirals ===
Week Six: Amsterdam Admirals at Barcelona Dragons – Game summary

Quarter	1	2	3	4	OT	Total
Amsterdam	0	20	0	14	6	40
Barcelona	6	9	11	8	0	34

at Estadi Olímpic de Montjuïc, Barcelona, Spain

- Date: Saturday, May 13
- Game time: 5:30 p.m. CEST
- Game attendance: 18,369
