= Lee Williamson (American football) =

American football player (born 1968)

Profile
- Position: Quarterback

Personal information
- Born: August 10, 1968 (age 58)
- Listed height: 6 ft 4 in (1.93 m)
- Listed weight: 215 lb (98 kg)

Career information
- High school: George Walton (Marietta, Georgia)
- College: Georgia Tech (1987–1989); Presbyterian (1990–1991)
- NFL draft: 1992: undrafted

Career history
- Houston Oilers (1993)*; Houston Oilers (1994); Scottish Claymores (1995); Houston Oilers (1995); Anaheim Piranhas (1997)
- * Offseason or practice squad member only

Career AFL statistics
- Comp. / Att.: 6 / 14
- Passing yards: 73
- TD–INT: 1–1
- Passer rating: 47.62
- Stats at ArenaFan.com

Grady Lee Williamson (born August 10, 1968) is an American former professional football quarterback who played for the Anaheim Piranhas of the Arena Football League (AFL) and the Scottish Claymores of the World League of American Football (WLAF). He played college football at Georgia Tech and Presbyterian College. He was also a member of the Houston Oilers of the National Football League.

== Early life ==
Grady Lee Williamson was born on August 10, 1968. He attended George Walton Comprehensive High School in Marietta, Georgia.

== College career ==
Williamson redshirted for the Georgia Tech Yellow Jackets in 1987 and was a two-year letterman from 1988 to 1989. He completed 26 of 53 passes (49.1%) for 256 yards, one touchdown, and two interceptions his freshman year in 1988. In 1989, he recorded one completion on two passing attempts for 19 yards, one touchdown, and one interception. Williamson transferred to play for the Presbyterian Blue Hose from 1990 to 1991.

== Professional career ==
Williamson was signed by the Houston Oilers of the National Football League in June 1993. He was waived in August 1993.

Williamson signed with the Oilers again on May 20, 1994. He was waived on August 22 but re-signed on September 2. After being on the active roster for the first game of the 1994 season, he was waived again on September 6. Williamson later re-signed with the Oilers on November 21, 1994, and was on the active roster for the final six games of the regular season.

Williamson played for the Scottish Claymores of the World League of American Football (WLAF) during the 1995 WLAF season, completing 37 of 86 passes (43.0%) for 341 yards, zero touchdowns, and five interceptions while also rushing six times for eight yards.

He signed with the Oilers again on July 24, 1995. He was placed on injured reserve in August 1995 and became a free agent in February 1996 after the 1995 season.

Williamson signed with the Anaheim Piranhas of the Arena Football League (AFL) in December 1996. He was the team's starter during the 1997 preseason, completing 21 of 36 passes for 221 yards and three touchdowns. However, Williamson left the team after Ron Lopez was named the starting quarterback before the first game of the 1997 AFL season. Williamson later returned to the Piranhas and played in two games for them that year, completing six of 14 passes (42.9%) for 73 yards, one touchdown, and one interception.

== Personal life ==
Williamson became a mortgage banker after his playing career. He was a co-founder of Bradbury & Williamson, Inc.
