= Andrus Peat =

American football player (born 1993)

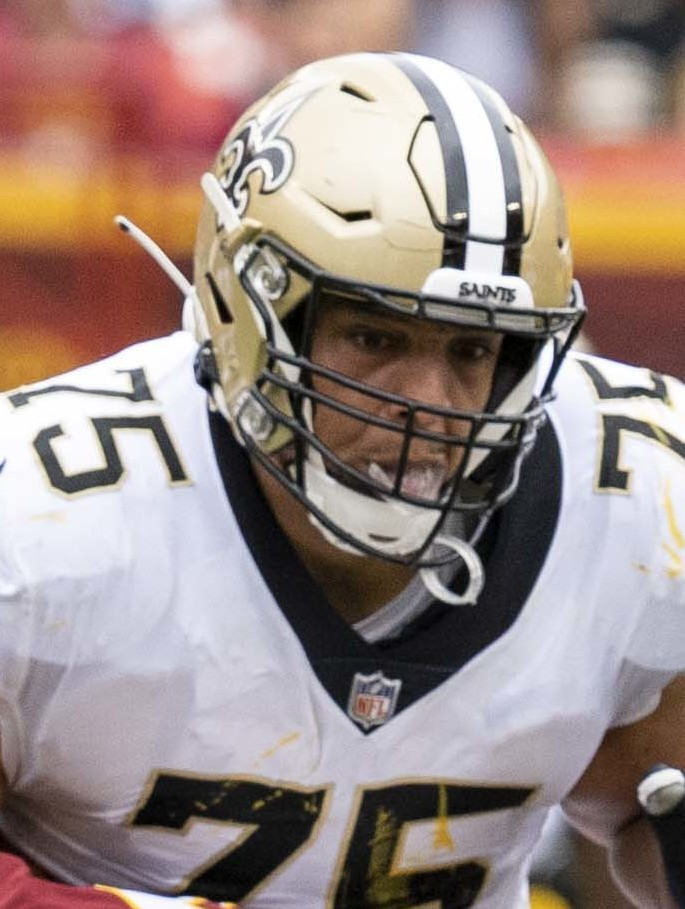
- Peat with the New Orleans Saints in 2021

No. 75, 68, 71
- Position: Offensive tackle

Personal information
- Born: November 4, 1993 (age 33); Chandler, Arizona, U.S.
- Listed height: 6 ft 7 in (2.01 m)
- Listed weight: 316 lb (143 kg)

Career information
- High school: Corona del Sol (Tempe, Arizona)
- College: Stanford (2012–2014)
- NFL draft: 2015: 1st round, 13th overall pick

Career history
- New Orleans Saints (2015–2023); Las Vegas Raiders (2024); Pittsburgh Steelers (2025)

Awards and highlights
- 3× Pro Bowl (2018–2020); Morris Trophy (2014); First-team All-Pac-12 (2014); Second-team All-Pac-12 (2013)

Career NFL statistics
- Games played: 132
- Games started: 106
- Stats at Pro Football Reference

Andrus Jamerson Peat (born November 4, 1993) is an American former professional football player who was an offensive tackle in the National Football League (NFL). He played nine seasons for the New Orleans Saints, who selected him in the first round of the 2015 NFL draft. Before that, he played college football for the Stanford Cardinal. As a high school senior, he was considered the best college football recruit by Sporting News. Peat also played for the Las Vegas Raiders and Pittsburgh Steelers.

== Early life ==
Peat was born in Mesa, Arizona, the son of Todd Peat and Jana Peat. His father played for nine seasons in the National Football League for the St. Louis/Phoenix Cardinals and Los Angeles Raiders. Peat attended Corona del Sol High School in Tempe, Arizona, where he was a letterman in football, basketball and track. In basketball, he played as a center, leading his basketball team to win the Division 1 state championship as a senior. In track and field, Peat competed as a shot putter and discus thrower.

By May 2011, Peat received 38 scholarship offers from college football teams. As of December 2011, Scout.com ranked him as a five-star recruit and the second-best offensive tackle in his class, Rivals.com rated him as a five-star recruit and the third-best offensive tackle in his class, and ESPN graded him out at 83 overall and the 16th-best player in his class. He was considered the best recruit in his class by Sporting News. He committed to Stanford on February 1, 2012. He was offered scholarships from Nebraska, Florida State, USC, Arizona, UCLA, Colorado, LSU, North Carolina, Oregon State, Clemson, Washington, Kansas, Tennessee, Auburn, Arkansas, Arizona State, Florida, Notre Dame, Michigan, Texas, Alabama, Miami, and Oregon.

== College career ==
As a freshman, Peat played in 13 games and averaged 20 snaps per game. He started all 14 games as a sophomore in 2013. As a junior in 2014, he won the Morris Trophy and was named an All-American.

After his junior season, Peat entered the 2015 NFL draft.

== Professional career ==
At the 2015 NFL Combine, commentator Mike Mayock appraised Peat's 40-yard dash, "He's got dancing feet with that lower body, it's unbelievable. Look at that body. Look at that bubble butt." On April 30, 2015, Peat was selected with the 13th pick by the New Orleans Saints in the 2015 NFL Draft.

Pre-draft measurables
Height	Weight	Arm length	Hand span	Wingspan	40-yard dash	10-yard split	20-yard split	20-yard shuttle	Three-cone drill	Vertical jump	Broad jump
6 ft 6 7/8 in (2.00 m)	313 lb (142 kg)	34 3/8 in (0.87 m)	10 5/8 in (0.27 m)	6 ft 8 1/4 in (2.04 m)	5.18 s	1.81 s	2.98 s	4.62 s	8.01 s	31.0 in (0.79 m)	8 ft 9 in (2.67 m)
All values from NFL Combine

=== New Orleans Saints ===
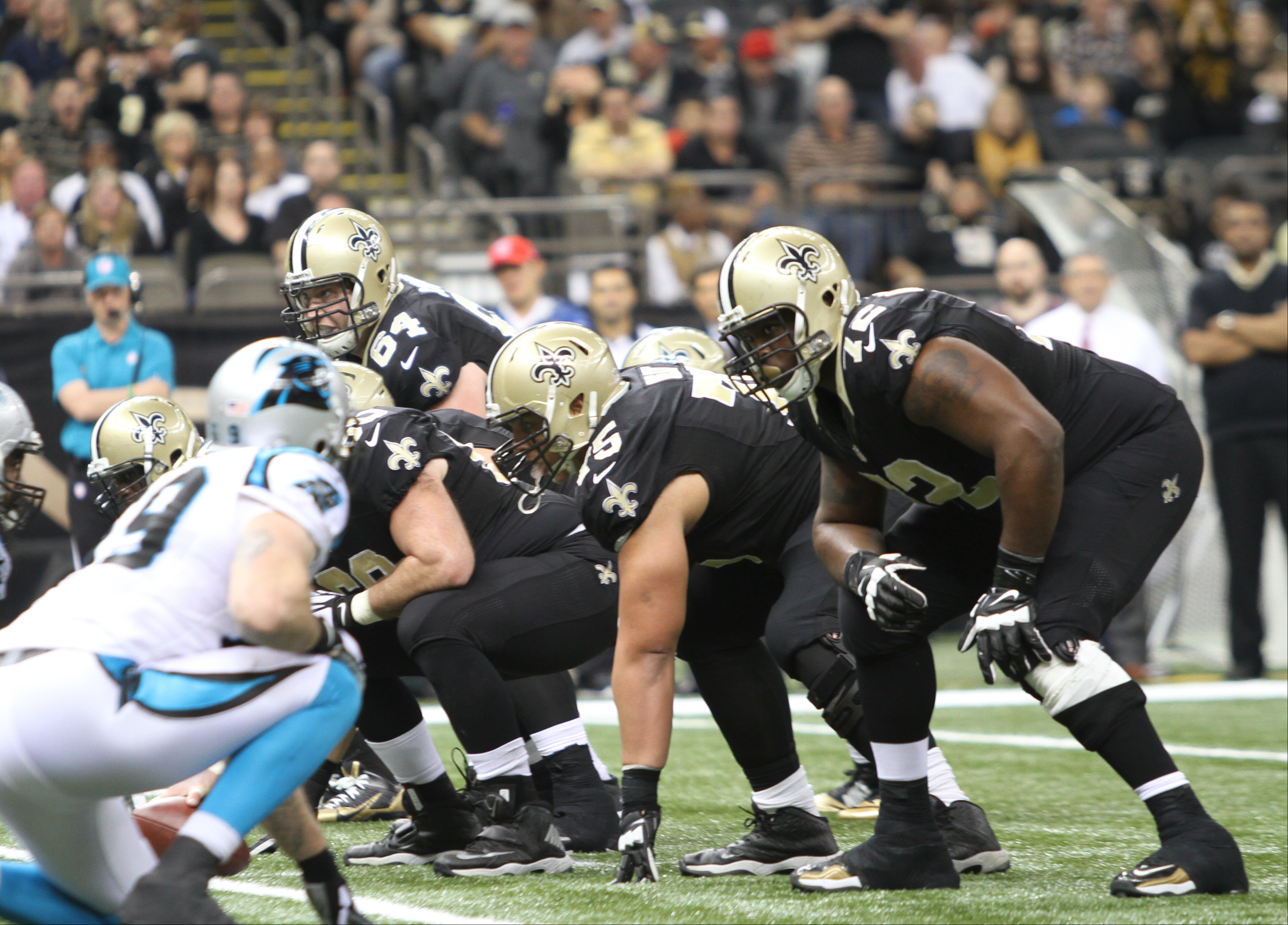
Peat (right, #75) playing for the Saints in 2015.

On May 21, 2015, he reached an agreement with the Saints on a four-year, $11.39 million contract. It also included a $6.54 million signing bonus and was fully guaranteed. He began the 2015 season as a backup offensive guard. On September 20, 2015, he received his first career start at left guard in a loss to the Tampa Bay Buccaneers. During a Week 6 matchup against the Atlanta Falcons, Peat suffered a leg injury that would force him out of action for the next 3 games. He finished his rookie campaign with 8 starts and played in 12 games. Throughout the season he split starts with offensive guard Tim Lelito.

Peat began the 2016 season as the starting left guard but started Weeks 3 and 4 at left tackle after Terron Armstead suffered a knee injury.

In 2017, Peat started 14 games at left guard for the Saints. In the wild card round of the playoffs, Peat was carted off with an air cast on his left leg. He was diagnosed with a broken fibula and a high ankle sprain and was placed on injured reserve on January 10, 2018.

On April 13, 2018, the Saints picked up the fifth-year option on Peat's contract.

On March 23, 2020, Peat signed a five-year, $57.5 million contract with the Saints.

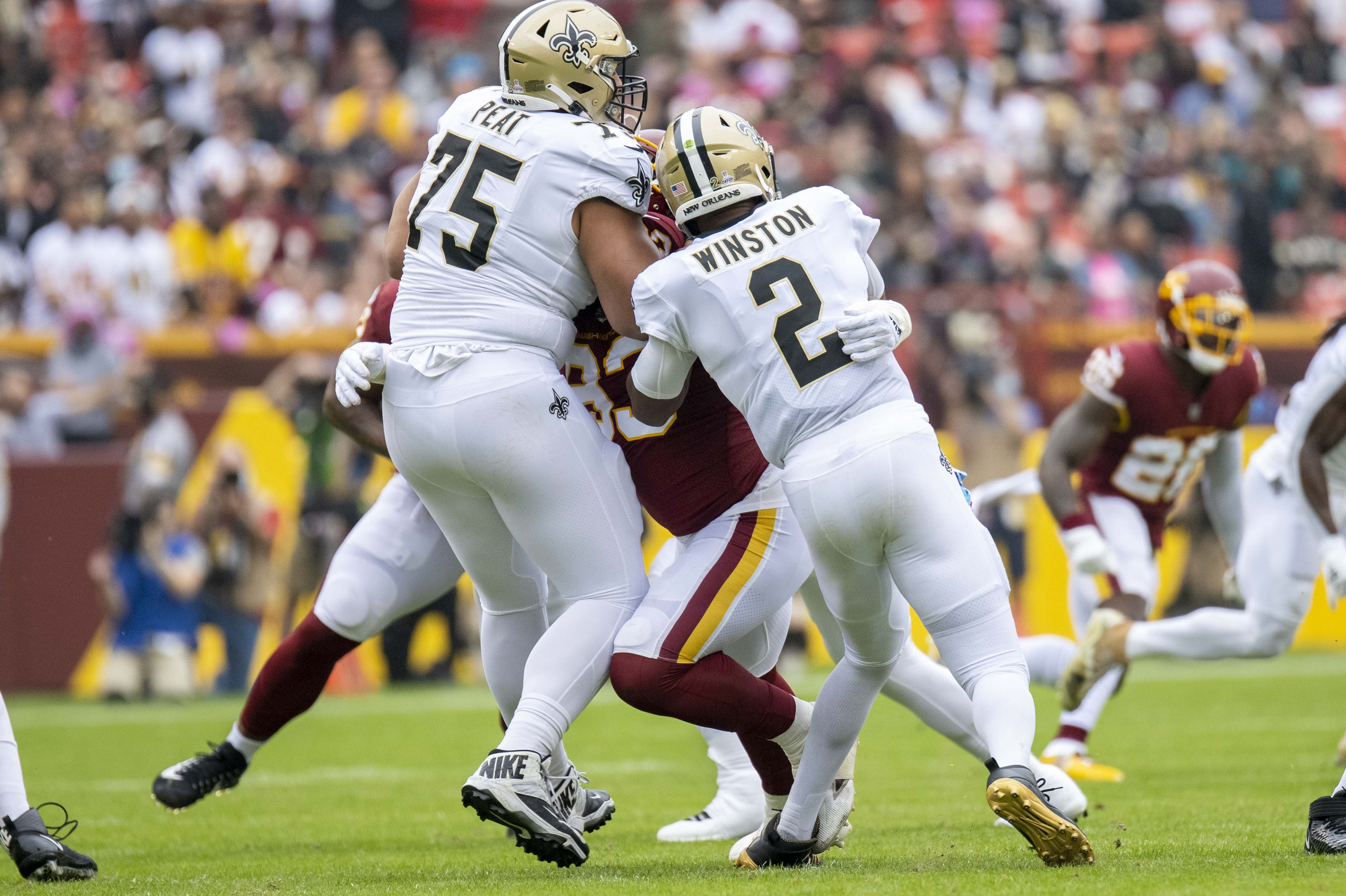
Peat playing against the Washington Football Team in 2021.

On October 30, 2021, Peat was placed on injured reserve after suffering a torn pectoral in Week 7.

=== Las Vegas Raiders ===
On May 13, 2024, Peat signed with the Las Vegas Raiders. He played in 15 games with only one start.

=== Pittsburgh Steelers ===
On August 7, 2025, Peat signed with the Pittsburgh Steelers. On December 7, Peat suffered an apparent lower-body injury that forced him out of the game. The Steelers announced shortly after that Peat was being evaluated for a concussion.

On July 31, 2026, Peat announced his retirement from professional football.

== Personal life ==
Peat has six siblings. His youngest brother, Koa, played college basketball for the Arizona Wildcats and plays professionally in the National Basketball Association (NBA) for the Phoenix Suns.

Peat is Native Hawaiian through his mother.
