= Allen DeGraffenreid (wide receiver) =

American football player (born 1970)

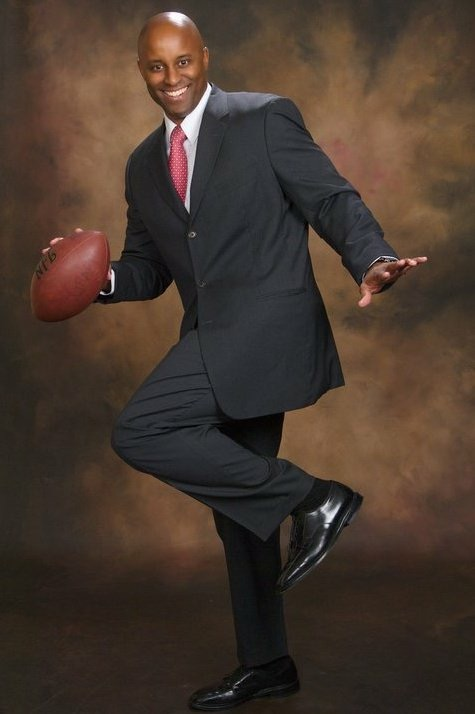

No. 85, 80, 81
- Position: Wide receiver

Personal information
- Born: May 1, 1970 (age 56); Cincinnati, Ohio, U.S.
- Listed height: 6 ft 3 in (1.91 m)
- Listed weight: 200 lb (91 kg)

Career information
- High school: Princeton (Sharonville, Ohio)
- College: Ohio State (1988–1992)
- NFL draft: 1993: undrafted

Career history
- Cincinnati Bengals (1993); Kansas City Chiefs (1993–1994)*; → Scottish Claymores (1995); Green Bay Packers (1996)*; Winnipeg Blue Bombers (1996); Scottish Claymores (1997); San Francisco 49ers (1997)*
- * Offseason or practice squad member only
- Stats at Pro Football Reference

Allen Justice DeGraffenreid (born May 1, 1970) is an American former professional football wide receiver who played one season with the Cincinnati Bengals of the National Football League (NFL). He played college football for the Ohio State Buckeyes. He was also a member of the Kansas City Chiefs, Green Bay Packers, and San Francisco 49ers of the NFL, the Scottish Claymores of the World League of American Football (WLAF), and the Winnipeg Blue Bombers of the Canadian Football League (CFL).

== Early life ==
Allen Justice DeGraffenreid was born on May 1, 1970, in Cincinnati, Ohio. He attended Princeton High School in Sharonville, Ohio. He participated in soccer, track, and football at Princeton High, and in his sophomore year, he was a member of the state title-winning 3,200 meter relay team. He joined the football team as a placekicker his junior year. He converted seven of nine field goals during his career and also made eight extra points in two games during the playoffs his senior year, helping Princeton win the state title.

== College career ==
By the time he had left high school, DeGraffenreid was 6'0" and 155 pounds. The University of Tennessee offered DeGraffenreid a scholarship to join the school's track team. He instead joined the Ohio State Buckeyes as a walk-on placekicker but later converted to wide receiver. After he redshirted the 1988 season, he played in four games as a redshirt freshman in 1989. He was then a three-year letterman from 1990 to 1992. He did not have a scholarship until 1991. Overall, he caught one pass for seven yards in 1990, one pass for 15 yards in 1991, and six passes for 65 yards in 1992. DeGraffenreid majored in psychology at Ohio State.

== Professional career ==
After going undrafted in the 1993 NFL draft, DeGraffenreid signed with the Cincinnati Bengals on April 27. He had a team-leading three catches for 48 yards in the 1993 preseason opener. He was released on August 30 but later re-signed on November 27. He played in two regular season games for the Bengals during the 1993 season before being released on December 15, 1993.

DeGraffenreid was signed to the practice squad of the Kansas City Chiefs on December 17, 1993. He became a free agent after the season and re-signed with the Chiefs on May 18, 1994. He was released on August 23 and signed to the team's practice squad on August 31. DeGraffenreid was released again on October 12 and signed to the practice squad again on October 19, 1994. In 1995, he was allocated to the World League of American Football (WLAF) to play for the Scottish Claymores. He started all ten games for the Claymores during the 1995 WLAF season, recording 44 receptions for 624 yards and four touchdowns, 21 kick returns for 490 yards, and eight punt returns for 70 yards. The Claymores finished the season with a 2–8 record. He was released by the Chiefs on August 22, 1995.

DeGraffenreid signed with the Green Bay Packers on January 4, 1996, but was released on August 21, 1996. He then played in four games for the Winnipeg Blue Bombers of the Canadian Football League (CFL) during the 1996 CFL season, catching eight passes for 132 yards, kicking off once for 61 yards, and returning one kick for five yards.

DeGraffenreid returned to the Claymores in 1997, totaling 23 receptions for 450 yards and two touchdowns, one special teams tackle, and one tackle on a turnover. He was signed by the San Francisco 49ers on June 26, 1997, but was released on August 19, 1997.

== Personal life ==
DeGraffenreid's sister, Stacey, played basketball for the Louisville Cardinals.
