= Mike Bellamy =

American football player and coach (born 1966)

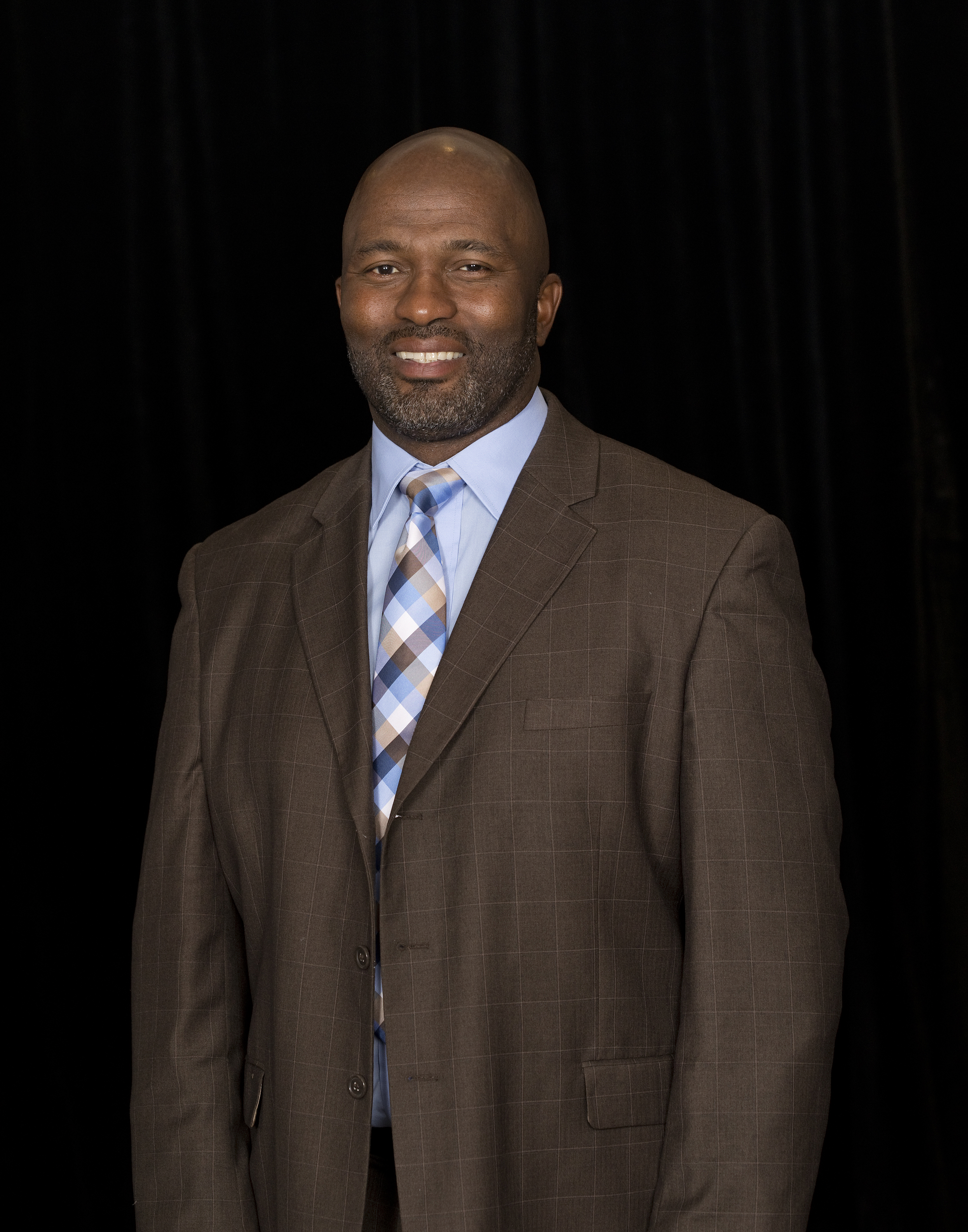
- Bellamy in 2019

Howard University
- Title: Special teams coordinator

Personal information
- Born: June 28, 1966 (age 60); New York, New York, U.S.
- Listed height: 6 ft 1 in (1.85 m)
- Listed weight: 195 lb (88 kg)

Career information
- High school: Kenwood Academy (Chicago, Illinois)
- College: College of DuPage (1986–1987); Illinois (1988–1989)
- NFL draft: 1990: 2nd round, 50th overall pick

Career history

Playing
- Philadelphia Eagles ({{NFL Year|(1990-1991); Indianapolis Colts (1992)*; Chicago Bears (1993)*; Winnipeg Blue Bombers (1993); Oakland Raiders (1994); Frankfurt Galaxy (1995–1996)
- * Offseason or practice squad member only

Coaching
- Sprayberry HS (GA) (2008–2010) Wide receivers coach & passing game coordinator; Clark Atlanta (2011) Wide receivers coach; Illinois (2013–2015) Wide receivers coach; Mississippi State (2016) Asst Wide Receiver Coach; Toledo (2017–2018) Wide receivers coach; Illinois (2019–2020) Running backs coach; Howard (2022-present) Special Teams Coordinator

Operations
- Illinois (2012) Assistant director of player personnel

Awards and highlights
- World Bowl champion (1995); Second-team All-American (1989); First-team All-Big Ten (1989); NJJCA Hall of Fame (2008)
- Stats at Pro Football Reference

Michael Sinclair Bellamy II (born June 28, 1966) is an American former professional football player who was a wide receiver for the Philadelphia Eagles of the National Football League (NFL). He played college football at Illinois Fighting Illini, earning second-team All-American honors in 1989. Bellamy was selected by the Eagles in the second round of the 1990 NFL draft. He completed his career with the Frankfurt Galaxy of the World Football League (WFL).

== College career ==
=== College of DuPage ===
In 1987, Mike Bellamy was a Junior College All-American for College of DuPage The top rated Junior College Wide Receiver prospect of 1987, Bellamy choose to attend University of Illinois. In 2009, Mike Bellamy was inducted into the NJCAA Football Hall of Fame in 2007, for his achievements over his Junior College career

=== University of Illinois ===
In 1989, Bellamy caught 59 passes for 927 yards and eight touchdowns for the Illinois Fighting Illini. He earned second-team All-America honors as a kick returner and first-team All-Big Ten honors as a wide receiver after the season. Being part of the 1989-1990 Fighting Illini, Bellamy and his teammates defeated the Virginia Cavaliers in the 1990 Florida Citrus Bowl. Bellamy recorded 10 catches for 189 yards for the game, leading the Illini to victory with teammate Jeff George.

== Professional career ==
Bellamy was selected by the Philadelphia Eagles in the second round (51st overall) of the 1990 NFL draft. He played in only six games for the Eagles because of injury, catching no passes. He returned a punt and two kickoffs as the Eagles reached the playoffs. He was released on August 26, 1991.

Bellamy spent time on offseason rosters for the Indianapolis Colts, Chicago Bears, and Oakland Raiders from 1992 to 1995. Being invited to participate in the resurgent World Football League, Bellamy finished his career playing in back to back World Bowl Championships, winning in 1996. In 1996, Bellamy also led the World League in touchdown receptions, along with teammates Mario Bailey and Bobby Olive.

== Coaching career ==
In 2008, Bellamy was hired as the wide receivers coach and passing game coordinator for Sprayberry High School.

In 2011, Bellamy was hired as the wide receivers coach for Clark Atlanta.

In 2012, Bellamy was hired as the assistant director of player personnel for Illinois. In 2013, he became the wide receivers coach.

In 2016, Bellamy was hired as a Senior Analyst/QC Coach for Mississippi State.

In 2017, Bellamy was hired as the wide receivers coach for Toledo.

In 2019, Bellamy was hired as the running backs coach for Illinois. He held the position until 2020.

In 2022, Bellamy was hired as an offensive quality control coach for Howard.
