= Mike Middleton (American football) =

American football player (born 1969)

No. 22
- Position: Safety

Personal information
- Born: December 4, 1969 (age 56); Cincinnati, Ohio, U.S.
- Listed height: 5 ft 11 in (1.80 m)
- Listed weight: 210 lb (95 kg)

Career information
- High school: Western Hills (Cincinnati)
- College: Indiana
- NFL draft: 1993: 3rd round, 84th overall pick

Career history
- Dallas Cowboys (1993)*; Saskatchewan Roughriders (1993); Miami Dolphins (1993-1994)*; Barcelona Dragons (1995–1996); Orlando Predators (1996–1997); New York CityHawks (1997); Augusta Stallions (2000)
- * Offseason or practice squad member only

Awards and highlights
- Second-team All-Big Ten (1992)
- Stats at ArenaFan.com

Mike Middleton (born December 4, 1969) is an American former professional football safety in the National Football League (NFL). He was selected by the Dallas Cowboys in the third round (84th overall) of the 1993 NFL draft. He played college football at Indiana University.

== Early life ==
Middleton attended Western Hills High School, where he played as a running back and linebacker. In his senior season, he posted 1,620 rushing yards and 20 touchdowns, including a 250-yard, 6-touchdown game against Walnut Hills.

He received All-conference and All-southwest Ohio honors. In his last 2 years he registered 2,742 yards and 35 touchdowns. He also practiced track and field.

== College career ==
Middleton accepted a football scholarship from Indiana University with the plan of being the eventual successor at running back to Anthony Thompson. A chronic injury to his right ankle that he suffered in the Ohio All-Star game, forced the team to redshirt him in his first season.

As a freshman, because of his size and athletic ability, the coaching staff wanted to find a way to get him on the field and converted him into a cornerback, although his body type was considered heavy for the position. As the starter at left cornerback he made 59 tackles (fourth on the team), 5 tackles for loss, 2 sacks, one interception and one pass defensed.

As a sophomore, he experienced a muscle spasm in the walls of his heart and missed 2 games. He finished the season with a career-high 65 tackles, 6 tackles for loss, 4 passes defensed and one interception. In the season opener he returned an interception 22-yards for a touchdown against the University of Kentucky. He had a career-high 15 tackles against Michigan State University. He also added 8 kickoffs returns for 169 yards (21.1-yard average). As a junior, he had 63 tackles (fourth on the team), 4 tackles for loss and 7 passes defensed (tied for the team lead).

In his last year, he was diagnosed with mononucleosis, which forced him to miss the first 2 games. He still was able to post 58 tackles (fourth on the team), 3 tackles for loss, 3 passes defensed and one forced fumble. He put together a string of double-digit tackle performances over the final three games of the season. He also practiced track and field as a senior.

He was a four-year starter, making 42 starts in 46 games, 245 tackles (18 for loss), 3 sacks, 15 passes defensed, 2 interceptions and one forced fumble.

== Professional career ==
=== Dallas Cowboys ===
Middleton was selected by the Dallas Cowboys in the third round (84th overall) of the 1993 NFL draft to play safety. He was released before the season started on August 23.

=== Miami Dolphins ===
In December 1993, he was added to the Miami Dolphins practice squad. He was signed for the 1994 training camp, but was released before the season started on April 25.

=== Barcelona Dragons (WLAF) ===
In 1995, he signed with the Barcelona Dragons of the World League of American Football. He was placed on the injured reserve list on May 11. In 1996, he returned as the starter at strong safety.

=== Orlando Predators (AFL) ===
On July 10, 1996, he signed with the Orlando Predators of the Arena Football League to play wide receiver/defensive back. On May 27, 1997, he was traded to the New York CityHawks along with the rights for John Bock in exchange for Curtis Cotton.

=== New York CityHawks (AFL) ===
In 1997, he signed with the New York CityHawks. He was waived on July 23.

=== Augusta Stallions (AF2) ===
In March 2000, he signed to play for the Augusta Stallions at fullback/linebacker in the inaugural AF2 season. On May 12, 2000, he was placed on the injured reserve list after tearing a ligament in his ankle.

== Personal life ==
Middleton became an assistant football coach at Winton Woods High School, helping the school win its first state championship in 2009.
