= Russ McCullough =

American football player (born 1968)

George Hultz
No.
- Position: Offensive Tackle

Personal information
- Born: October 31, 1968 (age 58); Kansas City, Missouri, U.S.
- Listed height: 6 ft 11 in (2.11 m)
- Listed weight: 350 lb (159 kg)

Career information
- High school: South (Olathe, Kansas)
- College: University of Missouri (1989–1992)

Career history
- Las Vegas Posse (1994); Frankfurt Galaxy (1995–1996)

Russell McCullough (born October 31, 1968) is an American former professional football player who was a offensive tackle in the Canadian Football League (CFL). He also was a professional wrestler.

== Early life and college ==
McCullough played football at the University of Missouri in 1990.

== Professional football career ==
He played for the Las Vegas Posse and Frankfurt Galaxy.

== Professional wrestling career ==
McCullough began his career in professional wrestling in 1999, working for Ohio Valley Wrestling, which was a developmental territory of the WWF. He made appearances for WWF (World Wrestling Federation) in dark matches and house shows. Also wrestled in Puerto Rico and Heartland Wrestling Association. His career ended in December 2001 when Rikishi attacked McCullough with a chair during a six-man tag match. After the match, McCullough quit wrestling.

== Personal life ==
On April 10, 2015, several media outlets reported that McCullough, along with Luther Reigns and fellow WWE alumnus Ryan Sakoda, had filed a class action lawsuit against WWE, alleging, among other things, that "the WWE has known for years ... the brutality in the ring has resulted in dementia, Alzheimer's disease and a lot more". The suit was litigated by attorney Konstantine Kyros, who has been involved in a number of other lawsuits against WWE. The lawsuit was dismissed by Judge Vanessa Lynne Bryant in March 2016.

== Championships and accomplishments ==
- International Wrestling Association
  - IWA Hardcore Championship (1 time)
  - IWA World Tag Team Championship (1 time) – with Tiger Ali Singh
