= Daron Alcorn =

American football player (born 1971)

No. 86, 48
- Position: Placekicker

Personal information
- Born: May 12, 1971 (age 55)
- Listed height: 6 ft 3 in (1.91 m)
- Listed weight: 255 lb (116 kg)

Career information
- High school: Mountain View (Vancouver, Washington)
- College: Akron
- NFL draft: 1993: 8th round, 224th overall pick

Career history
- Tampa Bay Buccaneers (1993)*; Frankfurt Galaxy (1995); Portland Forest Dragons/Oklahoma Wranglers (1997–2000); San Jose SaberCats (2001–2003); Las Vegas Gladiators (2004)
- * Offseason or practice squad member only

Awards and highlights
- ArenaBowl champion (2002); 2× Second-team All-Arena (1997, 1999); World Bowl champion (1995); First-team All-MAC (1993)

Career AFL statistics
- FG made: 100
- FG att: 202
- PAT made: 469
- PAT att: 544
- Tackles: 35.5
- Stats at ArenaFan.com

Daron Alcorn (born May 12, 1971) is an American former professional football placekicker who played eight seasons in the Arena Football League (AFL) with the Portland Forest Dragons/Oklahoma Wranglers, San Jose SaberCats and Las Vegas Gladiators. He was drafted by the Tampa Bay Buccaneers with the last selection in the 1993 NFL draft, making him Mr. Irrelevant. He played college football at the University of Akron. Alcorn was also a member of the Frankfurt Galaxy of the World League of American Football (WLAF).

== Early life and college ==
Daron Alcorn was born on May 12, 1971. He attended Mountain View High School in Vancouver, Washington.

Alcorn played for the Akron Zips from 1989 to 1992. He played punter as well as placekicker. He was named first-team All-Mid-American Conference in 1993.

== Professional career ==
Alcorn was selected by the Tampa Bay Buccaneers with the final pick in the 1993 NFL Draft, earning the title of Mr. Irrelevant. He was released by the Buccaneers on August 16, 1993.

Alcorn played for the Frankfurt Galaxy during the 1995 season and the team won the World Bowl '95.

Alcorn played for the Portland Forest Dragons/Oklahoma Wranglers from 1997 to 2000. He earned Second Team All-Arena honors in 1997 and 1999. The Forest Dragons moved to Oklahoma in 2000.

Alcorn signed with the San Jose SaberCats on July 13, 2001. The SaberCats won ArenaBowl XVI against the Arizona Rattlers on August 18, 2002. He was released by the SaberCats on December 22, 2003.

Alcorn was signed by the Las Vegas Gladiators on January 24, 2004. He was released by the Gladiators on February 26, 2004.
