= Joey Mickey =

American football player (born 1970)

No. 83, 88
- Position: Tight end

Personal information
- Born: November 29, 1970 (age 55); Oklahoma City, Oklahoma, U.S.
- Listed height: 6 ft 6 in (1.98 m)
- Listed weight: 288 lb (131 kg)

Career information
- High school: Millwood (Oklahoma City)
- College: Oklahoma
- NFL draft: 1993: 7th round, 190th overall pick

Career history
- Philadelphia Eagles (1993)*; Dallas Cowboys (1993); Philadelphia Eagles (1994)*; Barcelona Dragons (1995)
- * Offseason or practice squad member only

Awards and highlights
- Super Bowl champion (XXVIII)

Career NFL statistics
- Games played: 5
- Stats at Pro Football Reference

Joseph G. Mickey (born November 29, 1970) is an American former professional football player who was a tight end in the National Football League (NFL) for the Dallas Cowboys. He played college football for the Oklahoma Sooners.

== Early life ==
Mickey attended Millwood High School, where he practiced football and basketball. In football as a tight end he was a four-year starter, making 70 career receptions for 1,623 yards and 31 career touchdowns. He also played defensive end as a two-way player, registering 98 tackles and 11 quarterback sacks as a senior. He was named a Super Prep All-American and received The Oklahoman's Little All-City offensive player of the year award.

He accepted a scholarship from the University of Oklahoma. In the team's run-oriented offense he was used as a blocking tight end and became a starter as a junior. He caught 2 touchdown passes in the 1991 Gator Bowl. He finished his college career with 32 receptions for 406 yards and three touchdowns.

== Professional career ==
=== Philadelphia Eagles (first stint) ===
Mickey was selected by the Philadelphia Eagles in the seventh round (190th overall) of the 1993 NFL draft, dropping after not being able to fully participate NFL Scouting Combine because of a personal problem. He was waived on August 30.

=== Dallas Cowboys ===
On August 31, 1993, he was claimed off waivers by the Dallas Cowboys. He was the third-string tight end, played in 5 games as a blocker and was a part of the Super Bowl XXVIII championship team. He was cut on April 29, 1994.

=== Philadelphia Eagles (second stint) ===
In 1994, he signed with the Philadelphia Eagles. He was released on August 28, after being limited with a sprained knee and ankle.

=== Barcelona Dragons (WLAF) ===
In 1995, he played for the Barcelona Dragons of the World League of American Football, registering 20 receptions for 132 yards.

== Personal life ==
After football, he owned an insurance agency. He founded the New Alternative Center of Oklahoma, that offered counseling for substance and domestic abuse.
