= Sanjay Beach =

South Asian American football player (born 1966)

No. 89, 86, 82, 83, 84
- Position: Wide receiver

Personal information
- Born: February 21, 1966 (age 60); Clark Air Base, Philippines
- Listed height: 6 ft 0 in (1.83 m)
- Listed weight: 198 lb (90 kg)

Career information
- High school: Chandler (Chandler, Arizona, U.S.)
- College: Colorado State
- NFL draft: 1988: undrafted

Career history
- Dallas Cowboys (1988)*; New York Jets (1989); San Francisco 49ers (1990–1991); Green Bay Packers (1992–1993); San Francisco 49ers (1993); Kansas City Chiefs (1994)*; Amsterdam Admirals (1995); San Francisco 49ers (1995)*; Denver Broncos (1996)*
- * Offseason or practice squad member only

Awards and highlights
- Second-team All-WAC (1987)

Career NFL statistics
- Receptions: 26
- Receiving yards: 224
- Receiving touchdowns: 2
- Stats at Pro Football Reference

Sanjay Rajiv Beach (born February 21, 1966) is a Filipino-American former professional football player who was a wide receiver in the National Football League (NFL) for the New York Jets, San Francisco 49ers, and Green Bay Packers. He was also a member of the Amsterdam Admirals in NFL Europe. He played college football for the Colorado State Rams. He is the first player of Indian descent to play in the NFL.

== Early life ==
Beach was born at Clark Air Base in the Philippines. His father was born in Jamaica and became a U.S. Air Force sergeant. Beach's mother is from India. He attended Chandler High School in Chandler, Arizona, in the United States. As a senior, he received All-state honors at running back. He also practiced track.

He accepted a football scholarship from Colorado State University, from which he graduated in 1988 with a bachelor's degree in communication. As a freshman, he appeared in 7 games as a backup wide receiver, making 8 receptions for 129 yards and 11 kickoff returns for 297 yards (27-yard avg.)

As a sophomore, he appeared in 12 games, registering 37 receptions (second on the team), 381 receiving yards (third on the team), 3 receiving touchdowns (third on the team) and 18 kickoff returns for 381 yards (21.2-yard avg.).

As a junior, he appeared in 11 games, tallying 18 receptions for 192 yards. He returned 16 kickoffs for 382 yards (23.9-yard avg.).

As a senior, he appeared in 12 games, posting 22 receptions for 372yards. He had 23 kickoff returns for 497 yards (21.6-yard avg.) including a 99-yard touchdown return and received second-team All-Western Athletic Conference honors as a kick returner.

He finished his college career with 85 receptions for 1,074 yards, 3 receiving touchdowns, 68 kickoff returns for 1,557 yards (22.9-yard avg.) and one touchdown return. He also competed in track as a sprinter.

== Professional career ==
=== Dallas Cowboys ===
Beach was signed as an undrafted free agent by the Dallas Cowboys after the 1988 NFL Draft on April 28. After suffering an ankle injury, he was cut before the start of the season on August 19.

=== New York Jets ===
On April 11, 1989, he signed as a free agent with the New York Jets. He was released on August 28. On September 6, he was signed to the practice squad, where he spent most of the season. On October 13, he was activated for the sixth game against the New Orleans Saints. Beach became the first player of Indian descent to play in the NFL. On October 17, he was released and re-signed to the practice squad one day later on October 18.

=== San Francisco 49ers (first stint) ===
On March 21, 1990, he signed as a free agent with the San Francisco 49ers. He was released on August 31. He was signed to the practice squad on October 1, where he remained for the rest of the season.

In 1991, he appeared in all 16 games as a reserve wide receiver, behind Jerry Rice, John Taylor and Mike Sherrard. He posted 4 receptions for 43 yards (10.8-yard avg.), 10 punt returns for 53 yards and 2 kickoff returns for 37 yards.

=== Green Bay Packers ===
On March 28, 1992, he signed as a Plan B free agent with the Green Bay Packers, reuniting with head coach Mike Holmgren, who was his offensive coordinator with the 49ers. He started at flanker in the first 11 games opposite to All-Pro Sterling Sharpe, until giving way to Ron Lewis before the Week 12 game. He finished fifth on the team (second among wide receivers) with 17 catches for 122 yards and one touchdown. He caught his first career touchdown in the season opener against the Minnesota Vikings. In the second game against the Tampa Bay Buccaneers, Beach caught Brett Favre's first NFL completion, excluding a pass that was deflected and caught by Favre himself. He had a career-high 5 receptions against the Atlanta Falcons. He was released on September 25, 1993.

=== San Francisco 49ers (second stint) ===
On October 27, 1993, he was signed as a free agent by the San Francisco 49ers. He appeared in 9 games and caught five passes for 59 yards. He was released on August 23, 1994.

=== Amsterdam Admirals ===
In 1995, Beach attempted a comeback with the Amsterdam Admirals of NFL Europe. He registered 27 receptions for 383 yards (second on the team), a 14.2-yard average and one touchdown.

=== San Francisco 49ers (third stint) ===
On July 11, 1995, he signed as a free agent with the San Francisco 49ers. He was released before the start of the season.

=== Denver Broncos ===
On April 10, 1996, he signed as a free agent with the Denver Broncos, reuniting with head coach Mike Shanahan, who was his offensive coordinator with the 49ers. He was released on August 19.

== Personal life ==
After four years in the NFL, he retired, and went on to receive his master's degree in business administration from Colorado State University. He is currently a Managing Director for Raymond James Financial.
