= 1995 London Monarchs season =

World League of American Football team season

- General manager: Gareth Moores
- Head coach: Bobby Hammond
- Home stadium: White Hart Lane

Results
- Record: 4–6
- Division place: 4th
- Playoffs: Did not qualify

The 1995 London Monarchs season was the third season for the franchise in the World League of American Football (WLAF). The team was led by head coach Bobby Hammond in his first year, and played its home games at White Hart Lane in London, England. They finished the regular season in fourth place with a record of four wins and six losses.

During the season, in early May 1995 London signed ex-New York Jets linebacker Dean Lytle from the WLAF's Frankfurt Galaxy.

== Offseason ==
=== NFL allocations ===
Player name	Position	College	NFL team
LaVar Ball	TE	Cal State Los Angeles	New York Jets
Jim Ballard	QB	Mount Union	Cincinnati Bengals
Brad Johnson	QB	Florida State	Minnesota Vikings
Mike Moody	T	Southern California	Seattle Seahawks
Terrence Warren	WR	Hampton	Seattle Seahawks
Terrence Wisdom	G	Syracuse	New York Jets

== Personnel ==
In October 1994 the Monarchs appointed Bobby Hammond, ex-player and Philadelphia assistant, as their head coach.

=== Staff ===
1995 London Monarchs staff
Front office: General Manager – Gareth Moores; Head coaches: Head Coach – Bobby Hammond; Offensive coaches: Offensive Coordinator – Lionel Taylor; Offensive Line – Charlie Davis; National Coach – Tony Allen	Defensive coaches: Defensive Coordinator/Linebackers – Bob Zeman; Defensive Backs/Special Teams – Maurice Spencer

=== Roster ===
1995 London Monarchs final roster
Quarterbacks: 14 Brad Johnson; 15 Kevin McDougal; Running backs: 33 Tony Brooks; 24 Phil Bryant; 44 Al Wooten; Wide receivers: 10 Alan Allen; 85 Michael Baker; 88 Robert Jackson; 84 Larry Wallace; 26 Ronnie West; Tight ends: 80 LaVar Ball; 82 Michael Titley	Offensive linemen: 62 Damon Baldwin G; 71 Chris Luneburg T; 72 Terry McDaniels T; 73 Mike Moody T; 79 Karl Petrof C/G; 67 Craig Ritter G; 57 Dan Schmidt C; 61 Terrence Wisdom G; Defensive linemen: 63 A. J. Jenkins DE; 75 Billy Lofton DT; 70 Curtis McDaniel DT; 93 Gerald Nichols DT; 90 Gabriel Oladipo DT; 76 Rollin Putzier DE; 78 Herman Smith DE	Linebackers: 53 Tracy Gordon OLB; 59 Dave Hoffmann MLB; 58 Dean Lytle OLB; 97 Horace Morris OLB; 94 Richard Newbill MLB; 54 Brad Smith OLB; 56 Nick Smith OLB; Defensive backs: 27 Edward Buck S; 20 Carlton Lance CB; 28 Kenny McEntyre CB; 25 Jason Orton CB; 29 Kevin Porter S; 21 Eric Stephens CB; Special teams: 4 Sonny Feexico P; 2 Don Silvestri K	National players: 87 (England) Gerry Anderson TE; 30 (England) Rowelle Blenman S; 66 (England) Lewis Capes DE; 35 (England) Victor Ebubedike RB; 83 (England) Robert Flickinger TE; 45 (England) Stephen Hutchinson RB; Rookies in italics

== Schedule ==
Week	Date	Kickoff (Note: All times local to where the game was played.)	Opponent	Results		Game site	Attendance
Week	Date	Kickoff	Opponent	Final score	Team record	Game site	Attendance
1	Saturday, April 8	7:00 p.m.	at Frankfurt Galaxy	L 22–45	0–1	Waldstadion	28,021
2	Saturday, April 15	7:00 p.m.	at Rhein Fire	W 23–7	1–1	Rheinstadion	15,892
3	Sunday, April 23	3:00 p.m.	Amsterdam Admirals	L 10–17	1–2	White Hart Lane	8,763
4	Sunday, April 30	3:00 p.m.	Barcelona Dragons	L 24–39	1–3	White Hart Lane	10,287
5	Sunday, May 7	4:00 p.m.	at Scottish Claymores	W 11–10	2–3	Murrayfield Stadium	10,481
6	Monday, May 15	7:30 p.m.	Frankfurt Galaxy	L 7–27	2–4	White Hart Lane	8,912
7	Saturday, May 20	7:00 p.m.	at Barcelona Dragons	W 27–22	3–4	Estadi Olímpic de Montjuïc	18,850
8	Monday, May 29	3:00 p.m.	Rhein Fire	W 34–14	4–4	White Hart Lane	12,342
9	Saturday, June 3	7:00 p.m.	at Amsterdam Admirals	L 7–17	4–5	De Meer Stadion	8,469
10	Saturday, June 10	7:00 p.m.	Scottish Claymores	L 9–22	4–6	White Hart Lane	11,783

== Standings ==
World League of American Football
Team	W	L	T	PCT	PF	PA	Home	Road	STK
Amsterdam Admirals	9	1	0	.900	246	152	5–0	4–1	W2
Frankfurt Galaxy	6	4	0	.600	279	202	3–2	3–2	W3
Barcelona Dragons	5	5	0	.500	237	247	2–3	3–2	L1
London Monarchs	4	6	0	.400	174	220	1–4	3–2	L2
Rhein Fire	4	6	0	.400	221	279	2–3	2–3	L3
Scottish Claymores	2	8	0	.200	153	210	0–5	2–3	W1

== Game summaries ==
=== Week 1: at Frankfurt Galaxy ===
Week One: London Monarchs at Frankfurt Galaxy – Game summary

Quarter	1	2	3	4	Total
London	0	6	0	16	22
Frankfurt	7	14	24	0	45

at Waldstadion, Frankfurt, Germany

- Date: Saturday, April 8
- Game time: 7:00 p.m. CEST
- Game attendance: 28,021
- Referee: Mike Carey

=== Week 2: at Rhein Fire ===
Week Two: London Monarchs at Rhein Fire – Game summary

Quarter	1	2	3	4	Total
London	3	10	7	3	23
Rhein	7	0	0	0	7

at Rheinstadion, Düsseldorf, Germany

- Date: Saturday, April 15
- Game time: 7:00 p.m. CEST
- Game attendance: 15,892
- Referee: Larry Nemmers

=== Week 3: vs Amsterdam Admirals ===
Week Three: Amsterdam Admirals at London Monarchs – Game summary

Quarter	1	2	3	4	Total
Amsterdam	7	3	7	0	17
London	7	3	0	0	10

at White Hart Lane, London, England

- Date: Sunday, April 23
- Game time: 3:00 p.m. BST
- Game attendance: 8,763

=== Week 4: vs Barcelona Dragons ===
Week Four: Barcelona Dragons at London Monarchs – Game summary

Quarter	1	2	3	4	Total
Barcelona	3	9	14	13	39
London	0	7	3	14	24

at White Hart Lane, London, England

- Date: Sunday, April 30
- Game time: 3:00 p.m. BST
- Game attendance: 10,287

=== Week 5: at Scottish Claymores ===
Week Five: London Monarchs at Scottish Claymores – Game summary

Quarter	1	2	3	4	Total
London	4	0	0	7	11
Scotland	0	0	7	3	10

at Murrayfield Stadium, Edinburgh, Scotland

- Date: Sunday, May 7
- Game time: 4:00 p.m. BST
- Game attendance: 10,481

=== Week 6: vs Frankfurt Galaxy ===
Week Six: Frankfurt Galaxy at London Monarchs – Game summary

Quarter	1	2	3	4	Total
Frankfurt	7	10	10	0	27
London	7	0	0	0	7

at White Hart Lane, London, England

- Date: Monday, May 15
- Game time: 7:30 p.m. BST
- Game attendance: 8,912

=== Week 7: at Barcelona Dragons ===
Week Seven: London Monarchs at Barcelona Dragons – Game summary

Quarter	1	2	3	4	Total
London	14	6	0	7	27
Barcelona	6	3	6	7	22

at Estadi Olímpic de Montjuïc, Barcelona, Spain

- Date: Saturday, May 20
- Game time: 7:00 p.m. CEST
- Game attendance: 18,850

=== Week 8: vs Rhein Fire ===
Week Eight: Rhein Fire at London Monarchs – Game summary

Quarter	1	2	3	4	Total
Rhein	0	7	0	7	14
London	0	3	24	7	34

at White Hart Lane, London, England

- Date: Monday, May 29
- Game time: 3:00 p.m. BST
- Game attendance: 12,342

=== Week 9: at Amsterdam Admirals ===
Week Nine: London Monarchs at Amsterdam Admirals – Game summary

Quarter	1	2	3	4	Total
London	0	0	0	7	7
Amsterdam	7	0	7	3	17

at De Meer Stadion, Amsterdam, Netherlands

- Date: Saturday, June 3
- Game time: 7:00 p.m. CEST
- Game attendance: 8,469

=== Week 10: vs Scottish Claymores ===
Week Ten: Scottish Claymores at London Monarchs – Game summary

Quarter	1	2	3	4	Total
Scotland	0	7	10	5	22
London	0	3	6	0	9

at White Hart Lane, London, England

- Date: Saturday, June 10
- Game time: 7:00 p.m. BST
- Game attendance: 11,783
