= Tyree Davis =

American football player (born 1970)

No. 89, 83, 82, 84
- Position: Wide receiver

Personal information
- Born: September 23, 1970 (age 56); Altheimer, Arkansas, U.S.
- Listed height: 5 ft 9 in (1.75 m)
- Listed weight: 175 lb (79 kg)

Career information
- High school: Altheimer-Sherrill (Altheimer)
- College: Central Arkansas
- NFL draft: 1993: 7th round, 176th overall pick

Career history
- Tampa Bay Buccaneers (1993–1994); Barcelona Dragons (1995); Tampa Bay Buccaneers (1995); Cincinnati Bengals (1996)*; Barcelona Dragons (1997); Seattle Seahawks (1997); Montreal Alouettes (1998–2001); Toronto Argonauts (2002); Calgary Stampeders (2002); Hamilton Tiger-Cats (2003)
- * Offseason or practice squad member only

Awards and highlights
- World Bowl champion (V); Second-team All-World League (1995)

Career NFL statistics
- Receptions: 2
- Receiving yards: 48
- Return yards: 129
- Stats at Pro Football Reference

Tyree Bernard Davis (born September 23, 1970) is an American former professional football player who was a wide receiver in the National Football League (NFL) and Canadian Football League (CFL). He was selected by the Tampa Bay Buccaneers in the seventh round of the 1993 NFL draft. He played college football for the Central Arkansas Bears.

Davis has also played for the Barcelona Dragons, Seattle Seahawks and Montreal Alouettes.

== Personal life ==
Davis is the younger brother of former Kansas City Chiefs wide receiver, Willie Davis.
