= David Wilkins (American football) =

American football player (born 1969)

No. 66, 93, 74
- Position: Defensive end

Personal information
- Born: February 24, 1969 (age 57); Cincinnati, Ohio, U.S.
- Listed height: 6 ft 4 in (1.93 m)
- Listed weight: 240 lb (109 kg)

Career information
- High school: Aiken (Cincinnati)
- College: Eastern Kentucky
- NFL draft: 1992: undrafted

Career history
- San Francisco 49ers (1992); Atlanta Falcons (1994)*; Arizona Cardinals (1994)*; Milwaukee Mustangs (1995)*; Frankfurt Galaxy (1995); Indianapolis Colts (1995)*; Hamilton Tiger-Cats (1995); Indianapolis Colts (1996)
- * Offseason or practice squad member only

Awards and highlights
- World Bowl champion (1995); 2× First-team All-OVC (1990, 1991)
- Stats at Pro Football Reference

James David Wilkins II (born February 24, 1969) is an American former professional football defensive end who played for the San Francisco 49ers of the National Football League (NFL). He played college football for the Eastern Kentucky Colonels.

== Early life ==
James David Wilkins II was born on February 24, 1969, in Cincinnati, Ohio. He played high school football at Aiken High School in Cincinnati, earning all-state honors. He was also captain of the basketball team.

== College career ==
Wilkins enrolled at Eastern Kentucky University to play college football. He redshirted the 1987 season and played for the Colonels from 1988 to 1991. He posted 42 combined tackles in 1988. During the 1989 season, he recorded 33 solo tackles, 46 assisted tackles, and six sacks. Wilkins made 87 total tackles and nine sacks in 1990, earning first-team All-Ohio Valley Conference (OVC) and honorable mention All-American honors. As a senior in 1991, he posted 82 combined tackles and 12 sacks, garnering first-team All-OVC and honorable mention All-American recognition for the second straight season. Wilkins was inducted into Eastern Kentucky's athletics hall of fame in 2023.

== Professional career ==
After going undrafted in the 1992 NFL draft, Wilkins signed with the San Francisco 49ers on May 1. He was released on August 25 and signed to the practice squad on September 1. He was promoted to the active roster on September 23 and played in 13 games as a reserve defensive end during the 1992 season, recording 1.5 sacks and one forced fumble. Wilkins also appeared in one playoff game and was placed on injured reserve on January 16, 1993. He was released on August 24, 1993.

Wilkins was signed by the Atlanta Falcons on March 23, 1994. He was waived on August 15, 1994.

Wilkins was claimed off waivers by the Arizona Cardinals on August 16, 1994. He was released by Arizona on August 27, 1994, after the final game of the 1994 preseason.

Wilkins signed with the Milwaukee Mustangs of the Arena Football League on January 31, 1995, but never played for them. On February 20, 1995, he was drafted by the Frankfurt Galaxy of the World League of American Football (WLAF). He posted five sacks during the 1995 WLAF season, helping the Galaxy win World Bowl '95.

Wilkins signed with the Indianapolis Colts on July 15, 1995. He was released on August 27 after the final preseason game.

On September 20, 1995, it was reported that the Hamilton Tiger-Cats of the Canadian Football League had signed Wilkins to the team's practice roster. After former Eastern Kentucky teammate Jessie Small suffered a knee injury, Wilkins was promoted to the active roster to start against the Shreveport Pirates on October 7, 1995. He posted one tackle during the game.

Wilkins was signed by the Colts again on March 5, 1996. He was placed on injured reserve on July 22, 1996, where he spent the entire season. He became a free agent after the 1996 season.

== Personal life ==
After his football career, Wilkins has worked as a real estate investor and served as the vice president of the Cincinnati chapter of the NFL Players Association.
