= 1995 WLAF season =

- Duration: April 8, 1995 – June 10, 1995

World Bowl '95
- Date: June 17, 1995
- Venue: Olympisch Stadion, Amsterdam, Netherlands
- Champions: Frankfurt Galaxy

WLAF seasons seasons
- ← 1992 1996 →

The 1995 World League of American Football season was the third season of the professional American football league organized by the NFL. It was the league's first season with six teams based only in Europe.

Returning from a 2-year hiatus after the 1992 WLAF season, the league had dropped its seven North American teams, with the three existing teams (the Frankfurt Galaxy, London Monarchs and Barcelona Dragons) joined by three new franchises (the Rhein Fire, Scottish Claymores and Amsterdam Admirals).

The World Bowl '95 title game was won by Frankfurt, 26–22 over Amsterdam.

== Season ==
The top draft choice was Shaumbe Wright-Fair, who was picked by the Rhein Fire. The Scottish Claymores, after a 5–0 record in the preseason, surprisingly fired their head coach, Larry Kuharich, five days before their WLAF kickoff because "his coaching philosophy did not mesh with the make-up of the team".

Frankfurt's road to the World Bowl included a 27–7 win at London on May 15. The Claymores' hopes of making the World Bowl were dashed with a week 6 defeat by Rhein 33–27 in overtime. The Claymores ended their inaugural season with a 2–8 record.

World League of American Football
Team	W	L	T	PCT	PF	PA	Home	Road	STK
Amsterdam Admirals	9	1	0	.900	246	152	5–0	4–1	W2
Frankfurt Galaxy	6	4	0	.600	279	202	3–2	3–2	W3
Barcelona Dragons	5	5	0	.500	237	247	2–3	3–2	L1
London Monarchs	4	6	0	.400	174	220	1–4	3–2	L2
Rhein Fire	4	6	0	.400	221	279	2–3	2–3	L3
Scottish Claymores	2	8	0	.200	153	210	0–5	2–3	W1

== World Bowl '95 ==
Frankfurt beat Amsterdam 26–22 at Amsterdam Olympic Stadium.

The game was played on Saturday, June 17, 1995. The match-up was between the 6–4 Frankfurt Galaxy and the 9–1 Amsterdam Admirals. 23,847 fans witnessed the Galaxy pull off an upset en route to a 26–22 victory and their first ever World Bowl title. Quarterback Paul Justin earned MVP honors by completing 18 of 36 attempts for 308 yards with three touchdowns and one interception.

In the regular season the Admirals had won the teams' first meeting 14–12 in Amsterdam, while the Galaxy had taken the second meeting 28–13 in Frankfurt.
