= World Bowl '95 =

Championship of the World League of American Football

Frankfurt Galaxy	Amsterdam Admirals
26	22
	1	2	3	4	Total
FRA	0	6	14	6	26
AMS	0	7	0	15	22
- Date: Saturday, June 17, 1995
- Stadium: Olympisch Stadion; Amsterdam, Netherlands
- MVP: Paul Justin, Quarterback
- Referee: Tom White
- Attendance: 23,847

TV in the United States
- Network: Fox

World Bowl '95 (also referred to as World Bowl III) was the third championship game of the World League of American Football (WLAF), and the final game of the 1995 WLAF season. It was the first World Bowl to be played since World Bowl '92, after which the league had suspended operations for two years.

The match-up was between the 6–4 Frankfurt Galaxy and the 9–1 Amsterdam Admirals, at Olympisch Stadion in Amsterdam, Netherlands on Saturday, June 17, 1995. 23,847 fans witnessed the Galaxy pull off an upset en route to a 26–22 victory and their first ever World Bowl title. Quarterback Paul Justin earned MVP honors by completing 18 of 36 attempts for 308 yards with three touchdowns and one interception.

== Background ==
The Admirals won the first meeting 14–12 in Amsterdam, while the Galaxy took the second meeting 28–13 in Frankfurt.

== Game summary ==
After both sides failed to put up a single point in the first quarter, the Admirals drew first blood by blocking a 36-yard field goal attempt by Galaxy kicker Daron Alcorn. Afterwards, Admirals' quarterback Will Furrer put together a 12-play, 73-yard drive that was capped off with a five-yard pass to wide receiver Ernie Jones. However, the Galaxy managed to set up a good kick return to put themselves on Amsterdam's 46-yard line. On just the third play of the drive, Galaxy quarterback Paul Justin connected with fellow wide receiver Bobby Olive on an 11-yard pass. Unfortunately, the extra point attempt was no good, as Amsterdam led Frankfurt 7–6 at halftime. In the third quarter, the Galaxy managed to take the lead for the first time of the game, with a 4-play, 26-yard drive that ended with a 4-yard pass to Olive. Afterward, the Galaxy increased their lead with a 4-play, 38-yard drive that ended with a 31-yard pass from Paul Justin to Mike Bellamy. In the fourth quarter, Admirals running back T. C. Wright fumbled the ball, setting up a 3-play, 44-yard drive that helped increase Frankfurt's lead, with a 30-yard run by Nathaniel Bolton (extra point attempt missed). Down 26–7, the Admirals needed points and they needed them fast. Furrer was able to put up a 9-play, 78-yard drive that ended with a one-yard touchdown run by T. C. Wright. Afterwards, the Admirals got a 13-play, 58-yard drive that ended with a nine-yard pass to Wright. Following the touchdown, Furrer connected with wide receiver Sanjay Beach for the two-point conversion. Amsterdam recovered the onside kick and had 34 seconds to come up with a touchdown; however, key passes into the endzone fell incomplete, preserving Frankfurt's four-point lead and giving the Galaxy their first World Bowl title.

Scoring summary

Quarter	Time	Drive			Team	Scoring information	Score	
Quarter	Time	Plays	Yards	TOP	Team	Scoring information	Frankfurt	Amsterdam
2	1:16	12	73		Amsterdam	Ernie Jones 5-yard touchdown reception from Will Furrer, Terry Belden kick good	0	7
2	0:50	3	46		Frankfurt	Bobby Olive 11-yard touchdown reception from Paul Justin, kick no good	6	7
3	6:32	4	26		Frankfurt	Bobby Olive 4-yard touchdown reception from Paul Justin, Ralf Kleinmann kick good	13	7
3	4:52	4	38		Frankfurt	Mike Bellamy 31-yard touchdown reception from Paul Justin, Ralf Kleinmann kick good	20	7
4	10:23	3	44		Frankfurt	Nate Bolton 30-yard touchdown run, kick no good	26	7
4	6:54	9	78		Amsterdam	T. C. Wright 1-yard touchdown run, Terry Belden kick good	26	14
4	0:34	13	58		Amsterdam	T. C. Wright 9-yard touchdown reception from Will Furrer, 2-point pass good	26	22
"TOP" = time of possession. For other American football terms, see Glossary of American football.							26	22
