= 2002 Berlin Thunder season =

NFL Europe team season

- General manager: Michael Lang
- Head coach: Peter Vaas
- Home stadium: Jahn-Sportpark

Results
- Record: 6–4
- Division place: 2nd
- Playoffs: World Bowl X champion

The 2002 Berlin Thunder season was the fourth season for the franchise in the NFL Europe League (NFLEL). The team was led by head coach Peter Vaas in his third year, and played its home games at Jahn-Sportpark in Berlin, Germany. They finished the regular season in second place with a record of six wins and four losses. In World Bowl X, Berlin defeated the Rhein Fire 26–20. The victory marked the franchise's second World Bowl championship.

== Offseason ==
=== Free agent draft ===
2002 Berlin Thunder NFLEL free agent draft selections
Draft order			Player name	Position	College
Round	Choice	Overall	Player name	Position	College
1	6	6	Jude Waddy	LB	William & Mary
2	6	12	Larry Paul	DE	North Alabama
3	1	13	Freddie Moore	T	Florida A&M
4	6	24	Bryant Shaw	DE	Mississippi College
5	1	25	Reggie Nelson	G	McNeese State
6	6	36	Kenny Bryant	CB	Jackson State
7	1	37	Bubba Alexander	LB	Louisiana State

== Personnel ==
=== Staff ===
2002 Berlin Thunder staff
Front office: General Manager – Michael Lang; Head coaches: Head Coach – Peter Vaas; Offensive coaches: Offensive Coordinator/Offensive Line – Bob Bicknell; National Coach/Running Backs/Special Teams – Shuan Fatah; Wide Receivers – Bobby Beers	Defensive coaches: Defensive Coordinator/Linebackers – David Duggan; Defensive Line – Lee Johnson; Defensive Backs – Richard Kent; Strength and conditioning: Strength and Conditioning – Ryan George

=== Roster ===
2002 Berlin Thunder final roster
Quarterbacks: 7 Tim Hasselbeck; 8 Todd Husak; Running backs: 23 Walter James; 2 Mukala Sikyala (IR); 26 Jerry Westbrooks; 33 Anthony White; Wide receivers: 82 Kwame Cavil; 5 Kenny Christian; 1 Jermale Kelly; 81 Dane Looker; 85 Phil McGeoghan; 88 Ramondo North; Tight ends: 83 Jeff Kostrewa; 82 Ivan Mercer	Offensive linemen: 72 Darnell Alford T; 77 Derrick Chambers G; 50 Ben Hamilton C; 78 Jerry Jackson T; 74 Jeff Miller T; 70 Freddie Moore T; 74 Reggie Nelson G; 51 Jason Padget G; 76 Josh Warner G; Defensive linemen: 96 Cecil Caldwell DT; 90 Bill Duff DE/DT; 95 Dwayne Missouri DE; 62 Cleveland Pinkney DT; 91 Terdell Sands DT; 97 Bryant Shaw DT/DE; 98 Jesse Warren DE; 92 Antwone Young DE	Linebackers: 43 Keith Adams; 45 Bubba Alexander; 59 Antico Dalton; 58 Jonathan Jackson; 53 Mawuko Tugbenyoh; 54 Jude Waddy; Defensive backs: 25 Leo Barnes FS; 40 Calvin Branch CB/FS; 29 Tim Carter FS (IR); 22 Ahmad Hawkins CB; 21 Frank Staine-Pyne CB/FS; 27 Dwayne Stukes SS; 30 Sam Young CB; Special teams: 12 Danny Boyd K; 14 Brian Morton P	National players: 28 (France) Foad Ajdir CB; 20 (Germany) Lelan Brickus SS; 80 (Germany) Marico Gregersen WR; 84 (Germany) Jörg Heckenbach WR; 35 (France) Patrice Kancel RB; 9 (Germany) Axel Kruse K; 36 (Germany) Kim Kuci RB; 44 (Germany) Toko Pfeifenberger LB; Rookies in italics

== Standings ==
NFL Europe League
Team	W	L	T	PCT	PF	PA	Home	Road	STK
Rhein Fire	7	3	0	.700	166	156	4–1	3–2	L1
Berlin Thunder	6	4	0	.600	231	188	3–2	3–2	W3
Frankfurt Galaxy	6	4	0	.600	189	174	3–2	3–2	L2
Scottish Claymores	5	5	0	.500	197	172	3–2	2–3	W1
Amsterdam Admirals	4	6	0	.400	218	202	2–3	2–3	W2
FC Barcelona Dragons	2	8	0	.200	202	311	1–4	1–4	L3

== Game summaries ==
=== World Bowl X ===
World Bowl X: Berlin Thunder vs Rhein Fire – Game summary

Quarter	1	2	3	4	Total
Berlin	13	7	3	3	26
Rhein	0	0	7	13	20

at Rheinstadion, Düsseldorf, Germany

- Date: Saturday, June 22
- Game time: 6:04 p.m. CEST
- Game weather: 79 °F (26 °C), fair
- Game attendance: 53,109
- Referee: Walt Anderson
- TV announcers (FOX): Curt Menefee and Brian Baldinger
