= 2002 Rhein Fire season =

NFL Europe team season

- General manager: Alexander Leibkind
- Head coach: Pete Kuharchek
- Home stadium: Rheinstadion

Results
- Record: 7–3
- Division place: 1st
- Playoffs: Lost World Bowl X

The 2002 Rhein Fire season was the eighth season for the team in the NFL Europe League (NFLEL). The team was led by head coach Pete Kuharchek in his second year, and played its home games at Rheinstadion in Düsseldorf, Germany. They finished the regular season in first place with a record of seven wins and three losses. In World Bowl X, Rhein lost to the Berlin Thunder 26–20.

== Offseason ==
=== Free agent draft ===
2002 Rhein Fire NFLEL free agent draft selections
Draft order			Player name	Position	College
Round	Choice	Overall	Player name	Position	College
1	4	4	Corey Callens	DE	Oklahoma
2	4	10	Damonte McKenzie	DE	Clemson
3	3	15	Ben Nichols	G	Colorado
4	4	22	Trey Merkens	LB	Texas-El Paso
5	3	27	Aaron Humphrey	DE	Texas
6	4	34	John Raveche	T	Princeton
7	3	39	Daniel Greer	DT	Arizona
8	3	45	Adam Newman	TE	Boston College

== Personnel ==
=== Staff ===
2002 Rhein Fire staff
Front office: General Manager – Alexander Leibkind; Head coaches: Head Coach/Defensive Coordinator – Pete Kuharchek; Offensive coaches: Offensive Coordinator – Mike Jones; Wide Receivers – Tom Everest; Offensive Line – Whitey Jordan; Offensive Line – Guy McIntyre	Defensive coaches: Defensive Line/Special Teams – Ed O'Neil; National Coach/Linebackers – Jörn Maier; Defensive Backs – Adrian White; Strength and conditioning: Strength and Conditioning – Brian Ferguson

=== Roster ===
2002 Rhein Fire final roster
Quarterbacks: 17 Tee Martin; 11 Romaro Miller; Running backs: 25 Jamal Robertson; 36 Tony Taylor; Wide receivers: 81 Corey Alston; 80 Scott Cloman; 86 Onome Ojo; 9 Jimmy Robinson; Tight ends: 1 Darnell Dinkins; 83 David Newman; 88 Mark Thomas	Offensive linemen: 77 Ben Adams G; 56 Jonathan Himebauch C; 71 Alcender Jackson G; 70 Ed Kehl G/T; 75 Dustin Keith C; 76 Dustin Kroeker T; 69 Mike Malano G; 68 Josh Moore G/T; Defensive linemen: 92 Corey Callens DE; 91 DeVone Claybrooks DT; 90 Aaron Humphrey DE; 96 Riley Kleinhesselink DE; 97 Damonte McKenzie DT; 93 Brandon Miller DT	Linebackers: 54 Tim Johnson OLB; 52 Brad Rekuc OLB; 57 Jamel Smith OLB; 55 Maugaula Tuitele MLB; Defensive backs: 24 Greg Brown SS; 40 Deke Cooper FS; 28 Cedric Donaldson CB; 38 Earthwind Moreland CB; 27 Adrian Sadler CB; 29 Chandler Smith CB; 26 Jordan Younger CB/FS; Special teams: 8 Dirk Johnson P; 13 Jason Witczak K	National players: 5 (Japan) Akihito Amaya WR; 15 (Japan) Sumitaka Ando WR; 10 (Germany) Manfred Burgsmüller K; 50 (Germany) Anthony Doghmi OLB; 74 (Germany) Peter Heyer G/C; 53 (Japan) Shingo Hiruma MLB; 21 (Nigeria) Oyeniran Olalere Odunayo Ojo RB; 60 (Germany) Patrick Venzke T; 35 (Germany) Richard Yancy SS; Rookies in italics

== Standings ==
NFL Europe League
Team	W	L	T	PCT	PF	PA	Home	Road	STK
Rhein Fire	7	3	0	.700	166	156	4–1	3–2	L1
Berlin Thunder	6	4	0	.600	231	188	3–2	3–2	W3
Frankfurt Galaxy	6	4	0	.600	189	174	3–2	3–2	L2
Scottish Claymores	5	5	0	.500	197	172	3–2	2–3	W1
Amsterdam Admirals	4	6	0	.400	218	202	2–3	2–3	W2
FC Barcelona Dragons	2	8	0	.200	202	311	1–4	1–4	L3

== Game summaries ==
=== Week 1: at Amsterdam Admirals ===
Week One: Rhein Fire at Amsterdam Admirals – Game summary

Quarter	1	2	3	4	Total
Rhein	0	3	0	7	10
Amsterdam	3	17	7	0	27

at Amsterdam ArenA, Amsterdam, Netherlands

- Date: Saturday, April 13
- Game time: 7:08 p.m. CEST
- Game attendance: 13,743
- Referee: Alberto Riveron

=== World Bowl X ===
World Bowl X: Berlin Thunder vs Rhein Fire – Game summary

Quarter	1	2	3	4	Total
Berlin	13	7	3	3	26
Rhein	0	0	7	13	20

at Rheinstadion, Düsseldorf, Germany

- Date: Saturday, June 22
- Game time: 6:04 p.m. CEST
- Game weather: 79 °F (26 °C), fair
- Game attendance: 53,109
- Referee: Walt Anderson
- TV announcers (FOX): Curt Menefee and Brian Baldinger
