= 2002 Frankfurt Galaxy season =

NFL Europe team season

- General manager: Tilman Engel
- Head coach: Doug Graber
- Home stadium: Waldstadion

Results
- Record: 6–4
- Division place: 3rd
- Playoffs: Did not qualify

The 2002 Frankfurt Galaxy season was the tenth season for the franchise in the NFL Europe League (NFLEL). The team was led by head coach Doug Graber in his second year, and played its home games at Waldstadion in Frankfurt, Germany. They finished the regular season in third place with a record of six wins and four losses.

== Offseason ==
=== Free agent draft ===
2002 Frankfurt Galaxy NFLEL free agent draft selections
Draft order			Player name	Position	College
Round	Choice	Overall	Player name	Position	College
1	1	1	DeAngelo Lloyd	DE	Tennessee
2	1	7	Donta Kendrick	G	Southern California
3	6	18	Jahi Henley	CB	Tennessee Tech
4	1	19	Rashidi Barnes	S	Colorado
5	6	30	Andre Offing	LB	South Carolina
6	1	31	Albert Traylor	G	Northwestern State
7	6	42	Jon Michals	DE	Minnesota
8	1	43	Malcolm Johnson	WR	Notre Dame
9	1	46	Jack Hawley	QB	San Diego State
10	1	47	Dave Stachelski	TE	Boise State

== Personnel ==
=== Staff ===
2002 Frankfurt Galaxy staff
Front office: General manager – Tilman Engel; Head coaches: Head coach/special teams – Doug Graber; Offensive coaches: Offensive coordinator/quarterbacks/wide receivers – Dwain Painter; National coach/running backs – Patrick Esume; Offensive line – Don Lawrence	Defensive coaches: Defensive coordinator/linebackers – Bob Valesente; Defensive line – Charles Jones; Defensive backs – Marshall Roberts; Strength and conditioning: Strength and conditioning – Mike Berezowski

=== Roster ===
2002 Frankfurt Galaxy final roster
Quarterbacks: 8 Billy Cockerham; 1 Joe Hamilton; 17 Bart Hendricks; Running backs: 22 Curtis Alexander; 43 Joey Dozier; 24 Marlion Jackson; Wide receivers: 80 Jamaal Fobbs; 82 Ricky Hall; 5 Brian McDonald; 83 Jimmy Redmond; Tight ends: 87 Chris Eitzmann; 88 Ben Steele; 89 Marcus Williams	Offensive linemen: 53 Wilbert Brown C; 77 Jeff Chase G/T; 65 Mike Clare G; 71 Javiar Collins T; 51 Pat Downey G/C; 74 Lewis Kelly T; 70 Donta Kendrick G; 66 Kendell Mack G/T; 78 Terrance Simmons T; Defensive linemen: 93 Jerome Davis DE; 99 Shawn Hay DE; 97 DeAngelo Lloyd DE; 75 Norris McCleary DT; 91 Jon Michals DE; 95 Bryan Ray DE; 98 Nigel Tharpe DT	Linebackers: 58 Jody Littleton; 50 Josh Parry; 55 Wayne Rogers; 59 Michael Smith; Defensive backs: 28 Rashidi Barnes FS; 26 Walter Bernard CB; 25 Delvin Brown CB; 29 Chris Cummings CB; 27 Nijrell Eason FS/SS; 21 Armon Hatcher SS; 35 Corey Ivy CB; Special teams: 9 Matt Bryant K; 14 Gabe Lindstrom P	National players: 90 (Germany) Daniel Benetka DT; 86 (Germany) Werner Hippler TE; 2 (Sweden) Ola Kimrin K; 57 (Germany) Dusty Pearce LB; 94 (Sweden) Peter Rundberg DT; 16 (Germany) Slawomir Rybarczyk WR; 54 (Norway) Phillip Sissener LB; 19 (France) Marc Soumah WR; Rookies in italics

== Standings ==
NFL Europe League
Team	W	L	T	PCT	PF	PA	Home	Road	STK
Rhein Fire	7	3	0	.700	166	156	4–1	3–2	L1
Berlin Thunder	6	4	0	.600	231	188	3–2	3–2	W3
Frankfurt Galaxy	6	4	0	.600	189	174	3–2	3–2	L2
Scottish Claymores	5	5	0	.500	197	172	3–2	2–3	W1
Amsterdam Admirals	4	6	0	.400	218	202	2–3	2–3	W2
FC Barcelona Dragons	2	8	0	.200	202	311	1–4	1–4	L3
