= Dwayne Missouri =

German gridiron football player (born 1978)

No. 72
- Position: Defensive end

Personal information
- Born: December 23, 1978 (age 47); Frankfurt, West Germany
- Listed height: 6 ft 5 in (1.96 m)
- Listed weight: 260 lb (118 kg)

Career information
- High school: Roosevelt (San Antonio, Texas)
- College: Northwestern
- NFL draft: 2001: 7th round, 231st overall pick

Career history
- Baltimore Ravens (2001)*; Dallas Cowboys (2001); → Berlin Thunder (2002); San Francisco 49ers (2003)*; Colorado Crush (2003); Philadelphia Soul (2004−2007); Utah Blaze (2008)
- * Offseason or practice squad member only

Awards and highlights
- World Bowl champion (X); First-team All-Big Ten (2000); Second-team All-Big Ten (1999)

Career NFL statistics
- Games played: 2
- Stats at Pro Football Reference
- Stats at ArenaFan.com

Dwayne Anthony Missouri (born December 23, 1978) is a former American football defensive end in the National Football League (NFL) for the Baltimore Ravens, Dallas Cowboys, San Francisco 49ers. He also was a member of the Berlin Thunder in the NFL Europe League (NFLEL) Colorado Crush and the Philadelphia Soul, Utah Blaze in the Arena Football League (AFL). He played college football at Northwestern University.

== Early life ==
Missouri attended Theodore Roosevelt High School. As a senior, he helped his team win the state championship in football, receiving All-state, All-district, All-city and Defensive Player of the year honors.

He also practiced track, where he was a two-time Academic All-district selection as a shot putter.

== College career ==
Missouri accepted a football scholarship from Northwestern University. As a true freshman, he suffered a fractured fifth metatarsal in his right foot, that forced him to redshirt.

As a redshirt freshman, he appeared in 7 games, making 4 tackles and one fumble recovery. As a sophomore, he was named a starter at left defensive end, posting 34 tackles, 7 tackles for loss and 3 sacks.

As a junior, he recorded 52 tackles, 20 tackles for loss and 5 sacks. As a senior, he registered 51 tackles, 16 tackles for loss, 9 sacks and 5 forced fumbles (led the conference).

== Professional career ==
=== Baltimore Ravens ===
Missouri was selected by the Baltimore Ravens in the seventh round (231st overall) of the 2001 NFL draft. He was declared inactive for the season opener against the Chicago Bears. On September 12, he was waived to make room for linebacker Shannon Taylor, and was signed to the practice squad the next day.

=== Dallas Cowboys ===
On October 29, 2001, he was signed by the Dallas Cowboys from the Ravens practice squad. He was deactivated for the seventh and eighth game. He was a backup at left defensive end against the Philadelphia Eagles. He was deactivated for games tenth to thirteenth. He saw action against the Arizona Cardinals, before being deactivated for the last 2 games.

In 2002, he was allocated to the Berlin Thunder of the NFL Europe League (NFLEL). He collected 27 tackles, 5.5 sacks (second in the league), 4 passes defensed and 3 forced fumbles, helping the team win World Bowl X. He was released from the Cowboys on August 19.

=== San Francisco 49ers ===
On March 31, 2003, he was signed as a free agent by the San Francisco 49ers. On May 19, it was reported in the media that he didn't show up for a minicamp. The next day, it was reported that Missouri was quitting football.

=== Colorado Crush (AFL) ===
In 2003, he was signed by the Colorado Crush of the Arena Football League. He played in 7 games, making 8.5 total tackles, one sack, and 3 passes defensed. On September 17, he was traded to the Philadelphia Soul in exchange for a first round draft choice in the 2004 Expansion Draft.

=== Philadelphia Soul (AFL) ===
In his 4 seasons with the Philadelphia Soul of the Arena Football League, he registered 72.5 total tackles (10.5 for loss), 18.5 sacks, 15 passes defensed, 15 forced fumbles, 2 blocked kicks, 6 receptions for 38 yards and 2 touchdowns. He was released on November 12, 2007.

=== Utah Blaze (AFL) ===
On November 20, 2007, he was signed by the Utah Blaze of the Arena Football League.

== Personal life ==
Missouri was featured in the first season of HBO's Hard Knocks series as a member of the Baltimore Ravens. He is currently an assistant high school football coach at McCollum High School in San Antonio, Texas and working on his alternative certification to become a special education teacher.

On October 3, 2023 Missouri was arrested on animal cruelty charges.
