= Tony Taylor (running back) =

American football player (born 1978)

No. 36
- Position: Running back

Personal information
- Born: March 9, 1978; Pineville, Louisiana, U.S.
- Listed height: 5 ft 9 in (1.75 m)
- Listed weight: 191 lb (87 kg)

Career information
- High school: Pineville
- College: Northwestern State
- NFL draft: 2001: undrafted

Career history
- Dallas Cowboys (2001); → Rhein Fire (2002); Tampa Bay Buccaneers (2002–2003)

Awards and highlights
- Super Bowl champion (XXXVII)
- Stats at Pro Football Reference

Tony Taylor (born March 9, 1978) is an American former professional football running back who played for the Dallas Cowboys of the National Football League (NFL). He played college football for the Northwestern State Demons, and set the school's all-time career rushing record. He earned a Super Bowl ring during the 2002 NFL season as a member of the Tampa Bay Buccaneers' practice squad.

== Early life ==
Tony Taylor was born on March 9, 1978, in Pineville, Louisiana. He played high school football at Pineville High School, rushing for over 5,000 career yards. He earned all-state honors his senior year in 1997, and participated in the Louisiana High School All-Star Game as a replacement player. Taylor was also a triple jumper on the track team. In May 1996, he finished second in the Louisiana High School Athletic Association Track and Field meet. He qualified for the 1996 U.S. Junior Olympic trials. However, he was noted as a longshot to make the actual junior Olympic team because his triple jump was only 1.25" over the minimum qualification of 48'.

== College career ==
Taylor enrolled at Northwestern State University of Louisiana to play college football for the Demons from 1998 to 2000, earning first-team All-Southland Conference honors all three seasons. He played sparingly during the first six games of his freshman year but became a starter after Ronnie Powell suffered an ankle injury. Taylor's set the school's single-season rushing record in 1999 with 1,441 yards and again in 2000 with 1,507 yards. He ended his college career with 3,997 yards, the most in school history. Taylor also set a Northwestern State record with 112.7 career rushing yards per game. He skipped his senior year to enter the NFL draft. Taylor was also a triple jumper on the school's track team.

== Professional career ==
=== Dallas Cowboys ===
After going undrafted in the 2001 NFL draft, Taylor signed with the Dallas Cowboys on April 27. He was released on September 2 before the start of the regular season. He was then signed to the Cowboys' practice squad on September 4. On November 3, after running back Emmitt Smith suffered an injury, Taylor was promoted to the active roster as insurance. He did not play in the next day's game against the New York Giants. He made his NFL debut on November 11, 2001, against the Atlanta Falcons in a reserve role, carrying the ball once for no yards. Taylor was released on November 17 and signed to the practice squad again on November 19, where he spent the remainder of the 2001 season.

Taylor, due to become a free agent after the 2001 season, re-signed with the Cowboys on January 9, 2002. He was allocated to NFL Europe to play for the Rhein Fire. He played in all ten games, starting three, for the Fire during the 2002 NFL Europe season, rushing 111 times for 513 yards and two touchdowns while also catching seven passes for 40 yards. Taylor finished second on the team in rushing behind Jamal Robertson. The Fire advanced to World Bowl X but lost to the Berlin Thunder by a score of 26–20. Taylor was released by Dallas on September 1 before the start of the 2002 NFL season.

=== Tampa Bay Buccaneers ===
On November 19, 2002, Taylor was signed to the Tampa Bay Buccaneers' practice squad, where he spent the remainder of the 2002 season. On January 26, 2003, the Buccaneers won Super Bowl XXXVII against the Oakland Raiders by a margin of 48–21, and Taylor was awarded a Super Bowl ring. He re-signed with Tampa Bay on January 30, 2003. He was placed on injured reserve on August 22, 2003, and missed the entire 2003 season. Taylor became a free agent in March 2004, and was not re-signed.

== Personal life ==
Taylor earned a doctorate in education. As of 2021, he was the assistant principal at Shadow Creek High School in Pearland, Texas.
