= Alcender Jackson =

American football player (born 1977)

No. 71, 64
- Position: Guard

Personal information
- Born: May 18, 1977 (age 49); Pascagoula, Mississippi, U.S.
- Listed height: 6 ft 3 in (1.91 m)
- Listed weight: 311 lb (141 kg)

Career information
- High school: Moss Point (Moss Point, Mississippi)
- College: LSU
- NFL draft: 2000: undrafted

Career history
- Dallas Cowboys (2000–2001); → Rhein Fire (2002); Green Bay Packers (2002)

Awards and highlights
- All-NFLEL (2002)

Career NFL statistics
- Games played: 5
- Games started: 0
- Stats at Pro Football Reference

Alcender O'Neal Jackson (born May 18, 1977) is an American former professional football player who was a guard in the National Football League (NFL) for the Dallas Cowboys and Green Bay Packers. He played college football for the LSU Tigers.

== Early life ==
Jackson attended Moss Point High School, where he was a two-time Class 5A All-state selection at offensive tackle. As a senior, he helped his team achieve a 12-1 record, while receiving All-American honors from SuperPrep magazine and being named Mississippi player of the year by the Jackson Clarion-Ledger.

He accepted a football scholarship from Louisiana State University. As a freshman, he appeared in 5 games as backup. As a sophomore, he started 11 games at left tackle. As a junior, he started 5 games at left guard and missed 4 games with a sprained knee. As a senior, he started all games at left guard.

== Professional career ==
=== Dallas Cowboys ===
Jackson was signed as an undrafted free agent by the Dallas Cowboys after the 2000 NFL draft. In training camp, he was used at left and right guard. After making the team as a rookie, he was declared inactive for the first ten games and appeared in 3 of the last 6 contests. The next year, he was declared inactive for all of the regular season games.

In 2002, he was allocated to the Rhein Fire of NFL Europe. He received All-league honors at guard, after contributing to the team reaching World Bowl X and helping Jamal Robertson finish third in the league with 792 rushing yards and 8 touchdowns. The Cowboys waived him on September 1, 2002.

=== Green Bay Packers ===
On October 2, 2002, he was signed to the Green Bay Packers practice squad. He was released on October 9. He was signed to the active roster on December 4 after Chad Clifton was lost for the season with a severe pelvic injury. He was cut on December 23, after appearing in 2 games.
