= Harlandale Independent School District =

School district in Texas, United States

Address
- 102 Genevieve Street San Antonio, Texas, 78214; United States

District information
- Type: Public
- Grades: PK–12
- Schools: 20
- NCES District ID: 4822470

Students and staff
- Students: 11,546 (2025–2026)
- Teachers: 790.73 (on an FTE basis) (2025–2026)
- Staff: 899.54 (on an FTE basis) (2025–2026)
- Student–teacher ratio: 14.60 (2025–2026)

Other information
- Website: www.harlandale.net

Harlandale Independent School District is a public school district based in San Antonio, Texas, in the United States.

In 2010, the district was rated "Recognized" by the Texas Education Association, with 18 of 19 schools rated as "Recognized" or "Exemplary." In 2011, the district won the prestigious HEB Excellence in Education Award.

== Schools ==
=== High schools (Grades 9-12) ===
- Harlandale High School
  - 1999-2000 National Blue Ribbon School
- McCollum High School
- Frank M. Tejeda Academy
- STEM Early College High School

=== Middle schools (Grades 6-8) ===
- Harlandale Middle School
- Kingsborough Middle School
  - 2001-02 National Blue Ribbon School
- Leal Middle School
- Tejeda Junior Academy
- Terrell Wells Middle School

=== Elementary schools (Grades PK-5) ===
- Adams Elementary School
- Bellaire Elementary School
- Carroll Bell Elementary School
- Collier Elementary School
  - 2000-01 National Blue Ribbon School
- Columbia Heights Elementary School
- Gilbert Elementary School
- Gillette Elementary School
- Morrill Elementary School
  - 2003 National Blue Ribbon School
- Rayburn Elementary School
  - 2003 National Blue Ribbon School
- Schulze Elementary School
- Stonewall-Flanders Elementary School
- Vestal Elementary School
- Wright Elementary School

== Notable alumni & students ==
- Jesse Borrego† (class of 1980) – actor who played Cruz Candelaria in Blood In Blood Out
- Wilbur Huckle (class of 1960) – baseball player and manager in the New York Mets minor league system
- Milton A. Lee† (class of 1967) – Earn the Medal of Honor in the Vietnam War, killed in action in 1968
- Jesse James Leija† (class of 1984) – former professional boxer
- Leo Pacheco (class of 1976) – state representative
- George Boyd Pierce (class of 1959) – former member of the Texas House of Representatives from District 122
- Ciro Rodriguez – former U.S. Representative
- Tobin Rote† (class of 1946) – pro football quarterback, won NFL and AFL championships
- Frank Tejeda† – U.S. Marine and politician
- Fadli Zon – deputy speaker of the Indonesian People's Representative Council

== See also ==
- Harlandale High School § Notable alumni
