= Toby Korrodi =

American football player (born 1983)

Profile
- Position: Quarterback

Personal information
- Born: September 20, 1983 (age 43); San Antonio, Texas, U.S.
- Listed height: 6 ft 4 in (1.93 m)
- Listed weight: 234 lb (106 kg)

Career information
- High school: San Antonio (TX) Harlandale
- College: Central Missouri
- NFL draft: 2007: undrafted

Career history
- Arizona Cardinals (2007)*
- * Offseason or practice squad member only

Enrique Tobias Korrodi (born September 20, 1983) is an American former college football player. He was the starting quarterback for Central Missouri through 2006. At 6-foot-4, 234 pounds, Korrodi had the size to be considered an NFL prospect. At the 2007 Combine, he topped all passers in the ball-speed drill by recording a 63 mph pass.

On May 1, 2007, Korrodi signed as an undrafted free agent with the Arizona Cardinals. The Cardinals released him on August 23, 2007.

Korrodi attended Harlandale High School in San Antonio, Texas. He graduated from Harlandale High School in 2002.
