= 2002 Amsterdam Admirals season =

NFL Europe team season

- General manager: Ronald Buys
- Head coach: Bart Andrus
- Home stadium: Amsterdam ArenA

Results
- Record: 4–6
- Division place: 5th
- Playoffs: Did not qualify

The 2002 Amsterdam Admirals season was the eighth season for the franchise in the NFL Europe League (NFLEL). The team was led by head coach Bart Andrus in his second year, and played its home games at Amsterdam ArenA in Amsterdam, Netherlands. They finished the regular season in fifth place with a record of four wins and six losses.

== Offseason ==
=== Free agent draft ===
2002 Amsterdam Admirals NFLEL free agent draft selections
Draft order			Player name	Position	College
Round	Choice	Overall	Player name	Position	College
1	2	2	Mike Sutton	DE	Louisiana State
2	2	8	Jeremy Beutler	LB	Ohio
3	5	17	Brandon Godsey	CB	Miami (Ohio)
4	2	20	Rick Crowell	LB	Colorado State
5	5	29	Wes Hines	G	McNeese State
6	2	32	Ryan Kalich	G	Florida
7	5	41	Jim Stull	T	Delaware
8	2	44	Geroy Simon	WR	Maryland

== Personnel ==
=== Staff ===
2002 Amsterdam Admirals staff
Front office: General Manager – Ronald Buys; Head coaches: Head Coach/Offensive Coordinator – Bart Andrus; Offensive coaches: National Coach/Running Backs – John Leijten; Wide Receivers/Tight Ends – Harry Justvig; Offensive Line – Jeff Lewis	Defensive coaches: Defensive Coordinator/Linebackers – Larry Owens; Defensive Line – Darryl Sims; Defensive Backs/Special Teams – Jeff Reinebold

=== Roster ===
2002 Amsterdam Admirals final roster
Quarterbacks: 13 Kevin Daft; 1 David Dinkins; 11 Ken Mastrole; Running backs: 20 Rafael Cooper; 22 Morgan Kane; Wide receivers: 83 Reggie Allen; 80 Joey Getherall; 2 Kenyon Hambrick; 7 Marcus Knight; 84 Corey Nelson; Tight ends: 87 Ryan Collins; 82 Bryan Walker	Offensive linemen: 78 Adam Davis G; 68 Rob Gatrell G; 62 Ryan Kalich G; 77 Marques McFadden T; 75 Damon Nivens T; 66 Tupe Peko C; 60 Ian Rafferty T; 74 Chase Raynock T; 71 Jim Stull T; Defensive linemen: 92 John Gilmore DT; 90 Reggie Hargrove DT; 93 Terrell Jurineack DE; 96 Jermaine Miles DE; 91 Scott Pospisil DT; 99 Mike Sutton DE; 97 Colston Weatherington DT	Linebackers: 52 Rick Crowell; 59 Dwan Epps; 50 Eric Guenther; 57 Riall Johnson; 53 Paris Lenon; 51 Kevin Rollins; 54 Josh Stamer; Defensive backs: 25 Kory Blackwell CB; 43 Derek Combs CB; 28 Brandon Godsey CB; 23 Clinton Hart SS; 35 Ligarius Jennings CB; 45 Blaine McElmurry SS; 38 Ray Perryman FS; 21 Josh Phillips FS/SS; 24 Chad Sears FS; Special teams: 9 Andrew Bayes P; 16 Jay O'Donnell K	National players: 98 (Netherlands) Patrick Blokland DE; 14 (Netherlands) Silvio Diliberto K; 73 (Sweden) Michael Jonsson G; 58 (Japan) Masafumi Kawaguchi LB; 18 (Netherlands) Niels Meijer WR; 86 (Japan) Takao Mizuguchi WR; 94 (Croatia) Bernard Rozic DT; 81 (Japan) Kashino Shinsuke WR; Rookies in italics

== Schedule ==
Week	Date	Kickoff (Note: All times are in Central European Summer Time (CEST).)	Opponent	Results		Game site	Attendance
Week	Date	Kickoff	Opponent	Final score	Team record	Game site	Attendance
1	Saturday, April 13	7:00 p.m.	Rhein Fire	W 27–10	1–0	Amsterdam ArenA	13,743
2	Saturday, April 20	6:00 p.m.	at Berlin Thunder	W 24–19	2–0	Jahn-Sportpark	10,699
3	Saturday, April 27	5:30 p.m.	at Barcelona Dragons	L 27–30	2–1	Estadi Olímpic de Montjuïc	8,200
4	Friday, May 3	8:00 p.m.	Berlin Thunder	L 9–28	2–2	Amsterdam ArenA	10,207
5	Saturday, May 11	7:00 p.m.	Scottish Claymores	L 13–16	2–3	Amsterdam ArenA	9,243
6	Sunday, May 19	7:00 p.m.	at Frankfurt Galaxy	L 19–21	2–4	Waldstadion	27,456
7	Sunday, May 26	4:00 p.m.	at Scottish Claymores	L 13–17	2–5	Hampden Park	10,373
8	Saturday, June 1	7:00 p.m.	Frankfurt Galaxy	L 13–20	2–6	Amsterdam ArenA	11,983
9	Saturday, June 8	7:00 p.m.	Barcelona Dragons	W 45–31	3–6	Amsterdam ArenA	13,146
10	Saturday, June 15	7:00 p.m.	at Rhein Fire	W 28–10	4–6	Rheinstadion	33,486

== Standings ==
NFL Europe League
Team	W	L	T	PCT	PF	PA	Home	Road	STK
Rhein Fire	7	3	0	.700	166	156	4–1	3–2	L1
Berlin Thunder	6	4	0	.600	231	188	3–2	3–2	W3
Frankfurt Galaxy	6	4	0	.600	189	174	3–2	3–2	L2
Scottish Claymores	5	5	0	.500	197	172	3–2	2–3	W1
Amsterdam Admirals	4	6	0	.400	218	202	2–3	2–3	W2
FC Barcelona Dragons	2	8	0	.200	202	311	1–4	1–4	L3

== Game summaries ==
=== Week 1: vs Rhein Fire ===
Week One: Rhein Fire at Amsterdam Admirals – Game summary

Quarter	1	2	3	4	Total
Rhein	0	3	0	7	10
Amsterdam	3	17	7	0	27

at Amsterdam ArenA, Amsterdam, Netherlands

- Date: Saturday, April 13
- Game time: 7:08 p.m. CEST
- Game attendance: 13,743
- Referee: Alberto Riveron

== Statistics ==
=== Passing ===
Player	Comp	Att	Pct	Yards	TD	INT	Long	Sack	Rating
Kevin Daft	178	301	59.1	1,981	15	9	59	21	82.9
Ken Mastrole	12	28	42.9	147	1	2	27	5	41.9
David Dinkins	1	1	100.0	1	0	0	1	0	79.2
