= Jude Waddy =

American football player (born 1975)

No. 54, 90
- Position: Linebacker

Personal information
- Born: September 12, 1975 (age 51); Washington, D.C., U.S.
- Listed height: 6 ft 2 in (1.88 m)
- Listed weight: 230 lb (104 kg)

Career information
- High school: Suitland (Suitland, Maryland)
- College: William & Mary
- NFL draft: 1998: undrafted

Career history
- Green Bay Packers (1998–1999); Tampa Bay Buccaneers (2001)*; Berlin Thunder (2002); Denver Broncos (2002)*; San Diego Chargers (2003); Calgary Stampeders (2005)
- * Offseason or practice squad member only

Awards and highlights
- All-NFL Europe (2002); World Bowl champion (X)

Career NFL statistics
- Tackles: 79
- Sacks: 2
- Forced fumbles: 1
- Stats at Pro Football Reference

Jude Michael Waddy (born September 12, 1975) is an American former professional football player who was a linebacker for two seasons with the Green Bay Packers of the National Football League (NFL). He was signed by the Packers as an undrafted free agent in 1998. He played college football for the William & Mary Tribe. Waddy also played one season for the Berlin Thunder of NFL Europe and the San Diego Chargers of the NFL.

== Post Football ==
Waddy lives in Brooklyn, NY and is the founder of PhysiPet LLC, which designs, manufactures, and assembles pet toys.
