= Peter Vaas =

American football player and coach (born 1952)

Current position
- Title: Head coach
- Team: TSL Alphas

Biographical details
- Born: April 26, 1952 (age 74); Westwood, Massachusetts, U.S.

Playing career
- 1971–1973: Holy Cross
- Position: Quarterback

Coaching career (HC unless noted)
- 1974–1978: Allegheny (assistant)
- 1979–1982: New Hampshire (OB)
- 1983–1985: New Hampshire (OC)
- 1986–1989: Allegheny
- 1990: Notre Dame (RB)
- 1991: Notre Dame (QB)
- 1992–1995: Holy Cross
- 1996: Montreal Alouettes (OC)
- 1998–1999: Barcelona Dragons (QB/WR)
- 2000–2003: Berlin Thunder
- 2004–2005: Cologne Centurions
- 2005–2006: Notre Dame (QB)
- 2007: Duke (OC/QB)
- 2009: Miami (OH) (OC/TE)
- 2010–2011: South Florida (QB)
- 2012: South Florida (TE)
- 2020: Team 9 (OC)
- 2020–2021: TSL Alphas

Head coaching record
- Overall: 43–41–1 (college); 31–31 (NFL Europe)
- Tournaments: 0–1 (NCAA D-III playoffs)

Accomplishments and honors

Championships
- 2 NCAC (1987–1988); 2 World Bowl (IX, X)

Awards
- 2× NCAC Coach of the Year (1987–1988); NFL Europe Coach of the Year (2002)

Peter Vaas (born April 26, 1952) is an American football coach and former player. He served as the head football coach at Allegheny College from 1986 to 1989 and at the College of the Holy Cross from 1992 to 1995, compiling a career college football record of 43–41–1. He played football as a quarterback at Holy Cross from 1971 to 1973.

== Playing career ==
Vaas was a walk-on quarterback at Holy Cross. He was a three-year starter and set nine individual school passing records in his senior season. As a senior, he completed 135 passes for 1,631 yards and 13 touchdowns (and five touchdowns in one game). His career numbers included 2,642 passing yards and 21 touchdown passes.

== Coaching career ==
Vaas immediately began his coaching career following his graduation from Holy Cross in 1974. He served as an assistant coach at Allegheny College in Meadville, Pennsylvania for five seasons.

In 1979, Vaas was hired as the offensive backfield coach at the University of New Hampshire in Durham. He spent four seasons in that capacity before being promoted to the position of offensive coordinator in 1983. Vaas later went on to serve as the running backs and quarterbacks coach at the University of Notre Dame in 1990 and 1991 respectively. He left Notre Dame to return to his alma mater, Holy Cross, serving as their head football coach in 1992. Following Holy Cross, Vaas went to the Canadian Football League as the offensive coordinator for the Montreal Alouettes. In 1998, Vaas joined NFL Europe as the QB/WR coach with the Barcelona Dragons. Following a World Bowl bid in 1999 with the Dragons, he was named the head coach of the Berlin Thunder. Vaas would lead the Thunder in back-to-back World Bowl Championships in 2001 and 2002. Vaas was named the NFL Europe Coach of the Year in 2002. In 2004, Vaas was named head coach of the new NFL Europe franchise, the Cologne Centurions. Vaas left a successful professional coaching stint to return to Notre Dame in 2005 to serve as QB coach. In 2007, Vaas was named the QB/offensive coordinator at Duke University. Vaas continued his coaching journey at Miami-Ohio serving as the OC in 2009 until he joined the University of South Florida football staff in 2010. Vaas returned to professional coaching in 2020, serving as the offensive coordinator for Team 9 of the XFL. In 2021, he was the head coach of The Spring League Alphas.

Presently, Vaas is the assistant supervisor-replay for the Southeastern Conference (SEC). Prior to accepting that role on April 1, 2022, Vaas was an Atlantic Coast Conference (ACC) instant replay official and the supervisor of Colonial, Ivy Patriot League Replay (starting in the 2020 season). In 2022, Vaas served as the instant replay official for the national championship game between The University of Georgia and The University of Alabama. Vaas previously served (2014-2019) as a replay official and communicator for the American Athletic Conference (AAC).

Peter Vaas is the owner of Everything Football, LLC.

=== Allegheny ===
Vaas returned to Allegheny College as the Gators' head coach in 1986, a position he held for four seasons, until 1989. He led the team to back-to-back North Coast Athletic Conference championships in 1987 and 1988 and earned conference "Coach of the Year" honors both years. His coaching record at the school was 29–11–1. (.720).

=== Holy Cross ===
He spent four seasons as the head coach at Holy Cross from 1992 to 1995. His only winning season came in 1992, when he led his squad to a second-place finish in the Patriot League.

== XFL ==
In 2020, Vaas was announced as the offensive assistant coach for Team 9, the internal farm team/practice squad of the revived XFL.

== Head coaching record ==
=== College ===
Year	Team	Overall	Conference	Standing	Bowl/playoffs
Allegheny Gators (North Coast Athletic Conference) (1986–1989)
1986	Allegheny	6–4	4–2	3rd	
1987	Allegheny	9–1–1	6–0	1st	L NCAA Division III First Round
1988	Allegheny	8–2	6–0	1st	
1989	Allegheny	6–4	5–2	3rd	
Allegheny:		29–11–1	21–4		
Holy Cross Crusaders (Patriot League) (1992–1995)
1992	Holy Cross	6–5	4–1	2nd	
1993	Holy Cross	3–8	2–3	4th	
1994	Holy Cross	3–8	2–3	4th	
1995	Holy Cross	2–9	1–4	5th	
Holy Cross:		14–30	9–11		
Total:		43–41–1			
National championship Conference title Conference division title or championship game berth

=== Professional ===
Year	Team	Overall	Conference	Standing	Bowl/playoffs
Berlin Thunder (NFL Europe) (2000–2003)
2000	Berlin Thunder	4–6		6th	
2001	Berlin Thunder	6–4		2nd	W World Bowl IX
2002	Berlin Thunder	6–4		2nd	W World Bowl X
2003	Berlin Thunder	3–7		6th	
Berlin Thunder:		21–21			
Cologne Centurions (NFL Europe) (2004–2005)
2004	Cologne Centurions	4–6		4th	
2005	Cologne Centurions	6–4		3rd	
Cologne Centurions:		10–10			
Total:		31–31			
