= Mike Sutton (gridiron football) =

American gridiron football player and coach (born 1975)

No. 93, 99
- Position: Defensive end

Personal information
- Born: April 25, 1975 (age 51); Jacksonville, North Carolina, U.S.
- Listed height: 6 ft 4 in (1.93 m)
- Listed weight: 272 lb (123 kg)

Career information
- High school: Salmen (Slidell, Louisiana)
- College: LSU
- NFL draft: 1998: undrafted

Career history

Playing
- Tennessee Oilers/Titans (1998–1999); → Rhein Fire (1999); Jacksonville Jaguars (2000)*; → Berlin Thunder (2000); Memphis Maniax (2001); Los Angeles Avengers (2001); Amsterdam Admirals (2002); Cleveland Browns (2002)*; BC Lions (2003); Indiana Firebirds (2004); Tampa Bay Storm (2005); Columbus Destroyers (2006); Georgia Force (2007); Columbus Destroyers (2008); Dallas Desperados (2008)
- * Offseason or practice squad member only

Coaching
- Berlin Thunder (2003) Defensive line

Awards and highlights
- 2× All-NFL Europe (2000, 2002)

Career NFL statistics
- Total tackles: 1
- Stats at Pro Football Reference
- Stats at ArenaFan.com

Michael Dewayne Sutton (born April 25, 1975) is an American former professional football player who was a defensive end in the National Football League (NFL). He played college football for the LSU Tigers. Sutton began his career with the Tennessee Oilers of the NFL in 1998 and later played in NFL Europe, XFL and the Arena Football League (AFL). He was a two-time All-NFL Europe honoree.

== Early life and college ==
Born in Jacksonville, North Carolina, Sutton graduated from Salmen High School in Slidell, Louisiana. Sutton then attended Louisiana State University, where he played at defensive end for LSU Tigers football from 1994 to 1997 with a total of 80 tackles, 14 tackles for loss, 10 sacks, and three fumble recoveries.

== Professional career ==
After the 1998 NFL draft, Sutton signed as a free agent with the Tennessee Oilers on April 20, 1998. He spent much of the season on the practice squad before being promoted to the active roster on December 12 to replace an injured Anthony Cook. Sutton made his first and only NFL game appearance in the season finale on December 26, making one tackle.

In the spring of 1999, the Oilers became the Tennessee Titans and allocated Sutton to the Rhein Fire of NFL Europe. Sutton had 19 tackles, 2.5 sacks, an interception, a forced fumble, and a pass defended in 1999 with the Fire. On September 5, 1999, the Titans placed Sutton on injured reserve.

In 2000, Sutton signed with the Jacksonville Jaguars and played in 10 games for the Rhein Fire of NFL Europe during the spring. He had 39 tackles, nine sacks, a forced fumble, and three passes defended for the Fire and was on the 2000 All-NFL Europe team. He was released from the Jaguars on August 24, 2000 prior to the regular season.

Sutton started two games for the Memphis Maniax of the newly created XFL in 2001, starting two games with three tackles. Later in 2001, he played for the Los Angeles Avengers of the Arena Football League.

In 2002, Sutton returned to NFL Europe and started 10 games for the Amsterdam Admirals. With 29 tackles, six sacks, two forced fumbles, seven passes defended, and an interception returned for a touchdown, he made his second All-NFL Europe team.

Sutton played in three games for the BC Lions of the Canadian Football League in 2003, making five tackles and two passes defended in three games.

From 2004 to 2008, Sutton played in the Arena Football League.
