= Tim Hasselbeck =

American football player and sports journalist (born 1978)

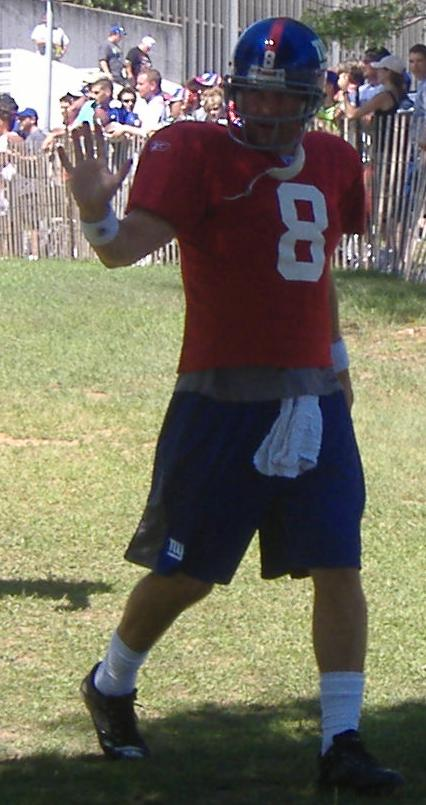
- Hasselbeck at New York Giants training camp in 2007

No. 4, 8
- Position: Quarterback

Personal information
- Born: April 6, 1978 (age 48); Norfolk, Massachusetts, U.S.
- Listed height: 6 ft 1 in (1.85 m)
- Listed weight: 214 lb (97 kg)

Career information
- High school: Xaverian Brothers (Westwood, Massachusetts)
- College: Boston College (1996–2000)
- NFL draft: 2001: undrafted

Career history

Playing
- Buffalo Bills (2001)*; Baltimore Ravens (2001)*; Philadelphia Eagles (2002)*; → Berlin Thunder (2002); Carolina Panthers (2002); Philadelphia Eagles (2002); Washington Redskins (2003–2004); New York Giants (2005–2006); Arizona Cardinals (2007)
- * Offseason or practice squad member only

Coaching
- Ensworth High School (2024–present) Head coach

Awards and highlights
- 2000 Scanlan Award Winner; World Bowl champion (X)

Career NFL statistics
- Passing attempts: 177
- Passing completions: 95
- Completion percentage: 53.7%
- TD–INT: 5–7
- Passing yards: 1,012
- Passer rating: 63.6
- Stats at Pro Football Reference

Timothy Thomas Hasselbeck (born April 6, 1978) is an American sports journalist and former professional football player who is an analyst for ESPN. He played as a quarterback for eight seasons in the National Football League (NFL) with the New York Giants, Washington Redskins, Philadelphia Eagles, Buffalo Bills, Baltimore Ravens, and Arizona Cardinals as well as the Berlin Thunder of NFL Europe. He played college football for the Boston College Eagles. He is the younger brother of former NFL quarterback Matt Hasselbeck.

== Early life ==
Tim Hasselbeck was born and raised in Norfolk, Massachusetts, to Mary Beth "Betsy" (Rueve) and Don Hasselbeck, a former New England Patriots tight end. He attended and played high school football at Xaverian Brothers High School in Westwood, Massachusetts. In three high school seasons, he threw for over 4,700 yards and 50 touchdowns. As a senior, Hasselbeck threw for 1,970 yards and 21 touchdowns, and ran for five touchdowns. After the season, he was named Player of the Year by both the Boston Globe and Boston Herald, Gatorade New England Player of the Year, and earned All-America honors from USA Today. Hasselbeck also played on Xaverian's basketball team. He was a New England Patriot's ball boy while growing up in the area.

== College career ==
Hasselbeck attended Boston College and played for the Eagles football team from 1996 through 2000. During this time, his older brother, Matt, was their starting quarterback (a position Tim would later hold). When he left Boston College, Tim was sixth in career passing with 3,980 yards, fifth in passing touchdowns with 29, sixth in total offense with 4,233 yards, seventh in passing completion percentage with 55.5 percent, seventh in pass completions (278), seventh in pass attempts (501), and seventh in career plays (636).

Hasselbeck graduated from Boston College with a bachelor's degree in marketing.

=== 1996–1998 ===
Hasselbeck was redshirted his first season and only took four snaps at quarterback as a redshirt freshman in 1997. However, he did play on all of the special teams units and registered two tackles. As a redshirt sophomore in 1998, Hasselbeck appeared in six games while spending most of the season as the backup to Scott Mutryn and completed nine of 12 passes for 140 yards and two touchdowns.

=== 1999 ===
Hasselbeck earned the starting quarterback spot in preseason as a redshirt junior and played in all 12 games. During the season, he completed 145 of 260 passes for 1,940 yards and 11 touchdowns and also rushed for 198 yards and three touchdowns. In a 24–23 upset win against Syracuse, he was six for 13 in passing for 161 yards and had 11 rushes for 52 and one touchdown. He accounted for 213 of Boston College's 269 yards and was named winner of the Orrie T. Scarminach Award, given to the Most Valuable Player of the Syracuse game. Hasselbeck was named the Big East Co-Offensive Player of the Week after Boston College's 31–29 upset win over Notre Dame. During the game, he completed 20 of 30 passes for 272 yards, accounted for all four of the teams' touchdowns (three pass, one rush), led the team in rushing with 60 yards, and accounted for 332 of Boston College's 442 yards of offense. On November 26, 1999, he completed the longest touchdown pass in Boston College history, a 97-yarder to Dedrick Dewalt in a 38–14 loss against Virginia Tech. After the regular season, Hasselbeck played in the 1999 Insight.com Bowl against Colorado, to whom Boston College lost 62–28 During the game, he completed 13 of 32 passes for 146 yards and a touchdown and rushed for 25 yards.

=== 2000 ===
Hasselbeck was sidelined for the 2000 spring practice season after having abdominal/groin surgery. As a team captain his senior season, he completed 133 of 250 passes for 2,019 yards with 18 touchdowns and 10 interceptions. He also rushed for 203 yards and recorded one rushing touchdown. That season, Hasselbeck was third in the conference in passing efficiency (135.7), fourth in passing yards per game (181.0), and third in total offense (195.1). After the season, he was awarded the Thomas F. Scanlan Award, awarded each season to the Boston College player who "best exemplifies the ideals of scholar, athlete, gentlemen, and friend."

== Professional career ==
Pre-draft measurables
Height	Weight	40-yard dash	10-yard split	20-yard split	20-yard shuttle	Three-cone drill	Vertical jump	Broad jump	Wonderlic
6 ft 1 1/4 in (1.86 m)	211 lb (96 kg)	4.83 s	1.68 s	2.79 s	4.40 s	7.27 s	33.0 in (0.84 m)	9 ft 5 in (2.87 m)	23
All values from NFL Combine

Hasselbeck was originally signed by the Buffalo Bills as an undrafted free agent in 2001 and he was signed to the Philadelphia Eagles practice squad in 2002 as a free agent.

In 2003, he was signed by the Washington Redskins, for which he spent two seasons as a backup quarterback. He entered the starting lineup in 2003 when then-starter Patrick Ramsey was injured. On December 7, 2003, he completed 13 of 19 passes for 154 yards in leading the Redskins to a 20–7 win over the New York Giants. He threw two touchdown passes and no interceptions in that game. The following week, he had the lowest possible single-game passer rating (0.0) in a 27–0 loss to the Dallas Cowboys. Hasselbeck was 6-for-26 (23 percent) for 57 yards with four interceptions.

In May 2005, the New York Giants signed Hasselbeck to be their backup for quarterback Eli Manning. His only game action with the Giants consisted of two kneeldowns. On September 1, 2007, he was released by the Giants.

Hasselbeck was signed by the Arizona Cardinals on October 16, 2007, after having been a television color commentator for their game against the Baltimore Ravens just a few weeks earlier. He appeared in one game with the Cardinals. He was also previously on the rosters of the Baltimore Ravens and Carolina Panthers without participating in a game. Hasselbeck had a 63.6 career passer rating.

== Sports analyst ==
Hasselbeck was a participant in the first annual "Broadcast Boot Camp" June 18–21, 2007 at NFL Films in Mt. Laurel, New Jersey. He made his television debut on September 23, 2007, announcing the Arizona Cardinals-Baltimore Ravens game for NFL on Fox. He is currently a sports analyst for ESPN, and has been on SportsNet New York and Sirius NFL Radio for a trial period, as well. He also works as a fantasy football analyst and co-hosts Fantasy Football Now on ESPN2 and ESPN.com.

On December 29, 2023, Hasselbeck announced the Gator Bowl where he confirmed it would be his last game broadcasting for ESPN. Hasselbeck will be coaching football at The Ensworth School in Nashville, Tennessee.

== Personal life ==
On July 6, 2002, he married television personality Elisabeth Filarski, whom he met in college. She was a Survivor contestant in 2001 and was a co-host on the ABC talk show The View from 2003 to July 2013. In September 2013, she joined Fox News, replacing Gretchen Carlson on the talk show Fox & Friends. The couple has one daughter, Grace Elisabeth (born April 2005), and two sons, Taylor Thomas (born November 2007) and Isaiah Timothy (born August 2009). On December 15, 2023, Hasselbeck was named the head coach of varsity football at Ensworth High School in Nashville, Tennessee.
