= Huckle =

Huckle may refer to:

- Huckle (surname)
- Mount Huckle, a mainly ice-covered mountain
- Thomas Huckle Weller (1915–2008), American virologist
- Huckle Cat a children's fictional character from Richard Scarry Books.

People with the surname Huckle:
