= Huckle (surname) =

Huckle is an English and German surname. Notable people with the surname include:

- Adam Huckle (born 1971), Zimbabwean cricketer
- Alan Huckle (born 1948), British colonial administrator
- James Huckle (born 1990), English sport shooter
- Patrick Huckle (born 1983), German footballer
- Richard Huckle (1986–2019), convicted English sex offender, "Britain's worst paedophile"
- Theodore Huckle, Welsh barrister
- Wilbur Huckle (born 1941), American professional baseball player
