= Bremond "Bay Bay" McClinton =

American football player (born 1962)

- Born: November 25, 1962 (age 63); San Antonio, Texas, U.S.
- Other name: Bay Bay Baybay Bay Bay McClinton Bremond "Bay-Bay" McClinton Bremond McClinton
- Education: Texas A&I Kingsville

Bremond "Bay-Bay" McClinton (born November 25, 1962) is an American former professional football player, currently working as a strength and conditioning sports and fitness trainer, and owner of All Sports Fitness in San Antonio, Texas. Bay-Bay has trained a variety of professional athletes such as Priest Holmes of the Kansas City Chiefs, Sam Hurd of the Dallas Cowboys, and Tobi Korrodi of the Arizona Cardinals among others.

== Early life and education ==
McClinton attended Theodore Roosevelt High School in San Antonio, Texas. In 1980, he was District 32-4A champion of Texas high school 100-meter dash with a time of 10.9. McClinton was a three-year college football letterman at Texas A&I in Kingsville (now Texas A&M Kingsville).

== Professional career ==
At the start of his professional football career in 1987, Bremond "Bay Bay" McClinton played for the CFL British Columbia Lions. In (1988-1989), Bay-Bay was signed by Bob Ackles of NFL Dallas Cowboys. He then played in NFL Europe for the Barcelona Dragons (1990-1991). The following year in 1992, he played for the NFL Houston Oilers. In 1995 he played for the CFL San Antonio Texans. Strength and conditioning coach Assistant San Antonio Spurs World Champions 03 & 05, (2000- 2006). In 2003 he was the Head Strength and Conditioning Coach for the WNBA San Antonio Silver Stars (now San Antonio Stars).

== Foundations ==
Bay Bay's Kids/All Sports Foundation
