= Antico Dalton =

American gridiron football player (born 1975)

No. 59, 90
- Positions: Linebacker, defensive lineman

Personal information
- Born: December 31, 1975 (age 50); Eden, North Carolina, U.S.
- Listed height: 6 ft 1 in (1.85 m)
- Listed weight: 240 lb (109 kg)

Career information
- High school: Morehead (Eden)
- College: Hampton
- NFL draft: 1999: 6th round, 199th overall pick

Career history
- Minnesota Vikings (1999); New England Patriots (2000); Berlin Thunder (2002); Atlanta Falcons (2002)*; Edmonton Eskimos (2005–2007)
- * Offseason or practice squad member only

Awards and highlights
- World Bowl champion (X); Grey Cup champion (93rd)
- Stats at Pro Football Reference

Antico Dalton (born December 31, 1975) is an American former professional football linebacker and defensive lineman. He was selected by the Minnesota Vikings in the sixth round of the 1999 NFL draft. He played college football at Hampton University.

Dalton would also play for the New England Patriots, Berlin Thunder and Edmonton Eskimos during his professional football career.
