= Josh Lovelady =

American football player (born 1978)

No. 70
- Position: Guard

Personal information
- Born: January 28, 1978 (age 48); Fort Hood, Texas, U.S.
- Listed height: 6 ft 3 in (1.91 m)
- Listed weight: 330 lb (150 kg)

Career information
- High school: Tidehaven (Elmaton, Texas)
- College: Houston (1996–2000)
- NFL draft: 2001: undrafted

Career history
- Detroit Lions (2001–2003); → Scottish Claymores (2002)
- Stats at Pro Football Reference

Joshua David Lovelady (born January 28, 1978) is an American former professional football guard who played two seasons with the Detroit Lions of the National Football League (NFL). He played college football at the University of Houston. He was also a member of the Scottish Claymores of NFL Europe.

== Early life and college ==
Joshua David Lovelady was born on January 28, 1978, in Fort Hood, Texas. He attended Tidehaven High School in Elmaton, Texas.

Lovelady played college football for the Houston Cougars of the University of Houston. He was redshirted in 1996. He was a four-year letterman from 1997 to 2000.

== Professional career ==
After going undrafted in the 2001 NFL draft, Lovelady signed with the Detroit Lions on June 12, 2001. He was released on September 2 and signed to the team's practice squad two days later. He was promoted to the active roster on October 31. Lovelady was later moved back to the practice squad. He did not play in any games that season. He re-signed with the Lions on February 4, 2002. He was allocated to NFL Europe to play for the Scottish Claymores in 2002. Lovelady played in all ten games, starting nine, for the Claymores during the 2002 season. He was released again on September 1 and signed to the practice squad again the next day. Lovelady was promoted to the active roster on December 3 and played in three games during the 2002 season. He became a free agent after the season and re-signed with the Lions on March 25, 2003. He appeared in 12 games in 2003. Lovelady became a free agent after the 2003 season and re-signed with the Lions on June 29, 2004. Lovelady was released for the final time on August 31, 2004.
