= 2002 Scottish Claymores season =

NFL Europe team season

- General manager: Steve Livingstone
- Head coach: Gene Dahlquist
- Home stadium: Hampden Park; Murrayfield Stadium

Results
- Record: 5–5
- Division place: 4th
- Playoffs: Did not qualify

The 2002 Scottish Claymores season was the eighth season for the franchise in the NFL Europe League (NFLEL). The team was led by head coach Gene Dahlquist in his second year, and played four of its home games at Hampden Park in Glasgow and one at Murrayfield Stadium in Edinburgh, Scotland. They finished the regular season in fourth place with a record of five wins and five losses.

== Offseason ==
=== Free agent draft ===
2002 Scottish Claymores NFLEL free agent draft selections
Draft order			Player name	Position	College
Round	Choice	Overall	Player name	Position	College
1	3	3	Terrell Jurineack	DE	Missouri
2	3	9	Matt O'Neal	C	Oklahoma
3	4	16	Cedric Pittman	DE	Nevada
4	3	21	Yubrenal Isabelle	LB	Virginia
5	4	28	Antoine Simpson	DT	Houston
6	3	33	Caleb Moore	G	Dartmouth
7	4	40	Moses Moreno	QB	Colorado State

== Personnel ==
=== Staff ===
2002 Scottish Claymores staff
Front office: General manager – Steve Livingstone; Head coaches: Head coach – Gene Dahlquist; Offensive coaches: Offensive coordinator/offensive line – Mike Deal; Wide receivers – Kevin O’Neal; National coach/tight ends – Stephen McCusker	Defensive coaches: Defensive coordinator/linebackers – Ray Woodard; Defensive line – Jim Tomsula; Defensive backs/special teams – Thomas McGaughey; Strength and conditioning: Strength and conditioning – Ron Davis

=== Roster ===
2002 Scottish Claymores final roster
Quarterbacks: 5 James Brown; 12 Scott Dreisbach; Running backs: 20 Robert Arnaud; 29 Herbert Goodman; Wide receivers: 80 Kwame Cavil; 86 Dondre Gilliam; 87 Kevin McKenzie; 85 J. J. Moses; Tight ends: 88 Elliott Carson; 84 Stevan Fontana	Offensive linemen: 77 Ian Allen T; 71 Jarvis Borum T; 72 McAlister Collins C; 74 Pita Elisara G; 73 Luke Fritz G; 70 Josh Lovelady G; 63 Matt O'Neal C; 66 Andy Stensrud T; Defensive linemen: 98 Pernell Davis NT; 94 Radell Lockhart DE; 95 DeVonte Peterson NT/DE; 90 Cedric Pittman DE; 92 Jarrett Procell DE	Linebackers: 54 London Dunlap OLB; 58 Michael Hawkes ILB; 55 Yubrenal Isabelle ILB; 52 Tony Ortiz OLB; 59 Jimmy Robinson ILB; 53 Mawuko Tugbenyoh OLB; Defensive backs: 26 Todd Franz FS/CB; 30 Willie Gary FS; 28 Keith Heyward-Johnson CB; 27 Mesene Louisdor CB; 46 Earl Riley SS; 25 James Rooths CB; 45 Scott Shields SS; 40 Hurley Tarver CB; Special teams: 11 Aron Langley P; 1 Lawrence Tynes K	National players: 21 (England) Rowelle Blenman WR; 89 (England) Jason Byworth WR; 33 (England) Kofi Campbell RB; 91 (Scotland) Robert Flickinger DE; 57 (Scotland) Stuart Hare OLB; 8 (England) Rob Hart K; 44 (Scotland) Peter Sochart TE; 16 (England) Scott McCready; 96 (England) Tom Tovo NT; Rookies in italics

== Schedule ==
Week	Date	Kickoff (Note: All times local to where the game was played.)	Opponent	Results		Game site	Attendance
Week	Date	Kickoff	Opponent	Final score	Team record	Game site	Attendance
1	Sunday, 14 April	3:00 p.m.	Barcelona Dragons	W 45–17	1–0	Hampden Park	11,808
2	Saturday, 20 April	7:00 p.m.	at Rhein Fire	L 10–13	1–1	Rheinstadion	30,117
3	Saturday, 27 April	7:00 p.m.	at Frankfurt Galaxy	L 9–16	1–2	Waldstadion	31,215
4	Sunday, 5 May	3:00 p.m.	Frankfurt Galaxy	L 10–14	1–3	Murrayfield Stadium	9,197
5	Saturday, 11 May	7:00 p.m.	at Amsterdam Admirals	W 16–13	2–3	Amsterdam ArenA	9,243
6	Sunday, 19 May	3:00 p.m.	Rhein Fire	W 17–7	3–3	Hampden Park	12,843
7	Sunday, 26 May	3:00 p.m.	Amsterdam Admirals	W 17–13	4–3	Hampden Park	10,373
8	Sunday, 2 June	7:00 p.m.	at Berlin Thunder	L 23–31	4–4	Jahn-Sportpark	8,696
9	Sunday, 9 June	3:00 p.m.	Berlin Thunder	L 23–24	4–5	Hampden Park	11,722
10	Saturday, 15 June	5:30 p.m.	at Barcelona Dragons	W 27–24	5–5	Estadi Olímpic de Montjuïc	8,119

== Standings ==
NFL Europe League
Team	W	L	T	PCT	PF	PA	Home	Road	STK
Rhein Fire	7	3	0	.700	166	156	4–1	3–2	L1
Berlin Thunder	6	4	0	.600	231	188	3–2	3–2	W3
Frankfurt Galaxy	6	4	0	.600	189	174	3–2	3–2	L2
Scottish Claymores	5	5	0	.500	197	172	3–2	2–3	W1
Amsterdam Admirals	4	6	0	.400	218	202	2–3	2–3	W2
FC Barcelona Dragons	2	8	0	.200	202	311	1–4	1–4	L3
