= Dwayne Stukes =

American football player and coach (born 1977)

Carolina Panthers
- Title: Special teams/defensive assistant

Personal information
- Born: January 24, 1977 (age 49); Portsmouth, Virginia, U.S.
- Listed height: 5 ft 11 in (1.80 m)
- Listed weight: 195 lb (88 kg)

Career information
- College: Virginia
- NFL draft: 2000: undrafted

Career history

Playing
- Atlanta Falcons (2000)*; Berlin Thunder (2001); Pittsburgh Steelers (2001)*; Berlin Thunder (2002); Tampa Bay Buccaneers (2002–2003)*; Colorado Crush (2004)
- * Offseason or practice squad member only

Coaching
- Berlin Thunder (2006) Assistant defensive backs coach; Tampa Bay Buccaneers (2006–2007) Coaches assistant; Tampa Bay Buccaneers (2008) Special teams quality control coach; Tampa Bay Buccaneers (2009–2010) Assistant defensive backs coach; Tampa Bay Buccaneers (2011) Special teams coordinator; Dallas Cowboys (2012) Minority coaching intern; Chicago Bears (2013–2014) Assistant special teams coordinator; New York Giants (2016–2017) Assistant special teams coordinator; Jacksonville Jaguars (2019–2020) Defensive assistant; Los Angeles Rams (2021) Assistant special teams coach; Denver Broncos (2022) Special teams coordinator; Carolina Panthers (2026-present) Special teams/defensive assistant

Awards and highlights
- As player: Super Bowl champion (XXXVII); World Bowl champion (IX, X); As coach: Super Bowl champion (LVI)
- Stats at ArenaFan.com

Dwayne Stukes (born January 24, 1977) is an American football coach and former defensive back. He was most recently the special teams coordinator for the Denver Broncos of the National Football League (NFL). He was previously an assistant special teams coach for the Chicago Bears and Los Angeles Rams.

== Professional playing career ==
Stukes was signed by the Atlanta Falcons as an undrafted free agent in 2000. He played college football at Virginia. He spent parts of four seasons in the NFL from 2000 to 2003 as a member of the Atlanta Falcons, Pittsburgh Steelers, and the Tampa Bay Buccaneers. Stukes also played in NFL Europe on the Berlin Thunder (2001–2002) and in the Arena Football League on the Colorado Crush).

== Coaching career ==
Stukes was hired by the Jacksonville Jaguars as a defensive assistant on February 21, 2019. Stukes assumed Jason Rebrovich's defensive line coaching duties for team's week 11 game in 2020 against the Pittsburgh Steelers due to Rebrovich missing the game for COVID-19 pandemic protocols.

On February 23, 2021, the Los Angeles Rams announced Stukes as an assistant special teams coach. Stukes won Super Bowl LVI when the Rams defeated the Cincinnati Bengals.

On February 18, 2022, Stukes was hired by the Denver Broncos to serve as the team's special teams coordinator for the 2022 season. On December 26, Stukes was fired by the Broncos and replaced by Mike Mallory.

== Personal ==
Stukes and his wife, Lori have four children: three daughters and a son.
