= 2002 FC Barcelona Dragons season =

NFL Europe team season

- General manager: Rafael Cervera
- Head coach: Jack Bicknell
- Home stadium: Estadi Olímpic de Montjuïc; Mini Estadi

Results
- Record: 2–8
- Division place: 6th
- Playoffs: Did not qualify

The 2002 FC Barcelona Dragons season was the tenth season for the franchise in the NFL Europe League (NFLEL). The team was led by head coach Jack Bicknell in his tenth year, and played its home games at Estadi Olímpic de Montjuïc and Mini Estadi in Barcelona, Spain. They finished the regular season in sixth place with a record of two wins and eight losses.

== Offseason ==
=== Free agent draft ===
2002 Barcelona Dragons NFLEL free agent draft selections
| Draft order | | | Player name | Position | College |
| Round | Choice | Overall | Player name | Position | College |
|---|---|---|---|---|---|
| 1 | 5 | 5 | Terry Battle | RB | Arizona State |
| 2 | 5 | 11 | Ennis Davis | DT | Southern California |
| 3 | 2 | 14 | Jason Moore | DB | San Diego State |
| 4 | 5 | 23 | Joe Todd | LB | Hofstra |
| 5 | 2 | 26 | Rashad Harris | LB | Louisville |
| 6 | 5 | 35 | David Bobo | G | Texas Christian |
| 7 | 2 | 38 | Jeff Popovich | S | Miami |

== Personnel ==
=== Staff ===
2002 Barcelona Dragons staff
| Front office: General Manager – Rafael Cervera; Head coaches: Head Coach – Jack Bicknell; Offensive coaches: Offensive Coordinator/Offensive Line – Vince Martino; Quarterbacks/Wide Receivers – Sam Rutigliano; National Coach/Running Backs – Marcos Guirles | Defensive coaches: Defensive Coordinator/Defensive Backs – Dan Daniel; Defensive Line – Desmond Robinson; Linebackers – Ken Clarke; Strength and conditioning: Strength and Conditioning – Dave Mikel |

=== Roster ===
2002 Barcelona Dragons final roster
| Quarterbacks: 7 Joe Germaine; 11 Mike Watkins; 10 Ted White; Running backs: 22 Carl Fair; 23 Derek Homer; Wide receivers: 9 Richmond Flowers; 80 Daniel Guy; 8 Khori Ivy; 5 Dave Klemic; 2 DeRonnie Pitts; Tight ends: 88 Brad Christenson; 84 Robbie Snelling; 83 Damian Vaughn (IR); 81 Ben Zagorski | Offensive linemen: 66 Stan Bennett T; 78 Damion Cook T; 71 Kaulana Noa G; 69 Ray Redziniak C/G; 63 Tim Stuber G; 64 Ty Wise C; 77 Joe Wong T; Defensive linemen: 76 Randy Chevrier DT; 96 Ennis Davis DT; 97 Toby Golliday DT; 92 Terry Jolly DT; 98 Matt Layow DE; 93 Mario Monds DT; 95 Troy Pelshak DE; 99 Ron Warner DE; 91 Keith Washington DE | Linebackers: 57 Cornelius Anthony; 51 Jim Emanuel; 53 Rashad Harris; 54 Kenny Jackson; Defensive backs: 26 Eugene Clinton CB/S; 36 Renard Cox S; 25 Wade Davis CB; 28 Dempsey Dees CB; 35 Troy Grant CB; 30 Than Merrill S; 27 Jason Moore S; Special teams: 15 Bill Lafleur P; 16 Vitaly Pisetsky K | National players: 14 (Spain) Jesús Angoy K; 56 (France) Cedric Cotar LB; 55 (Spain) Albert Fernandez LB; 20 (France) Samyr Hamoudi CB/S; 1 (Mexico) Marco Martos WR; 90 (Sweden) Dan Petersson DT; 82 (Mexico) Carlos Rosado WR; 21 (Sweden) Aristides Denis Sanchez RB; Rookies in italics |

== Standings ==
NFL Europe League
| Team | W | L | T | PCT | PF | PA | Home | Road | STK |
|---|---|---|---|---|---|---|---|---|---|
| Rhein Fire | 7 | 3 | 0 | .700 | 166 | 156 | 4–1 | 3–2 | L1 |
| Berlin Thunder | 6 | 4 | 0 | .600 | 231 | 188 | 3–2 | 3–2 | W3 |
| Frankfurt Galaxy | 6 | 4 | 0 | .600 | 189 | 174 | 3–2 | 3–2 | L2 |
| Scottish Claymores | 5 | 5 | 0 | .500 | 197 | 172 | 3–2 | 2–3 | W1 |
| Amsterdam Admirals | 4 | 6 | 0 | .400 | 218 | 202 | 2–3 | 2–3 | W2 |
| FC Barcelona Dragons | 2 | 8 | 0 | .200 | 202 | 311 | 1–4 | 1–4 | L3 |
