= Central Missouri Mules football =

University of Central Missouri football team

- First season: 1894; 132 years ago
- Athletic director: Matt Howdeshell
- Head coach: Josh Lamberson; 3rd season, 20–12 (.625)
- Location: Warrensburg, Missouri
- Stadium: Audrey J. Walton Stadium (capacity: 10,000)
- Field: Vernon Kennedy Field
- NCAA division: Division II
- Conference: The MIAA
- Colors: Cardinal and black
- All-time record: 559–511–51 (.521)

Conference championships
- 8
- Fight song: Go Mules!
- Mascot: Mo the Mule
- Marching band: Marching Mules
- Outfitter: Nike
- Website: www.ucmathletics.com

The Central Missouri Mules football program represents the University of Central Missouri in college football and competes in the NCAA Division II. In 1912, Central Missouri was a charter member of the Mid-America Intercollegiate Athletics Association (MIAA), and has remained in the league. UCM's home games are played at Audrey J. Walton Stadium in Warrensburg, Missouri.

Central Missouri's football program dates back to 1894, and has won eight conference championships, and appeared in the NCAA Division II playoffs twice in 2002, and 2010. Entering the 2015 season, Central Missouri's all-time record was 529–507–52.

The team is coached by Josh Lamberson.

== Conference affiliations ==
- 1912–present: Mid-America Intercollegiate Athletics Association

== Championships ==
- Conference championships (9)

Year	Conference	Coach	Overall record	Conference record
1926	Missouri Intercollegiate Athletic Association	Theodore C. Reid	7–0–1	4–0
1956†	Missouri Intercollegiate Athletic Association	Lew Comer	7–2	4–1
1970†	Missouri Intercollegiate Athletic Association	Howard Mahanes	9–2	5–1
1983†	Missouri Intercollegiate Athletic Association	Terry Noland	6–5	4–1
1986	Missouri Intercollegiate Athletic Association	Terry Noland	9–2	5–0
1987†	Missouri Intercollegiate Athletic Association	Terry Noland	7–3–1	5–0–1
1988†	Missouri Intercollegiate Athletic Association	Terry Noland	6–5	5–1
2003†	Mid-America Intercollegiate Athletics Association	Willie Fritz	9–2	7–2
2019†	Mid-America Intercollegiate Athletics Association	Jim Svoboda	11–2	10–1
Total Conference championships:			9	
† Denotes co-champions

== Playoff appearances ==
=== NCAA Division II ===
The Mules have made five appearances in the NCAA Division II playoffs, with a combined record of 4–5.

Year	Round	Opponent	Result
2002	First Round	Northern Colorado	L, 28–49
2010	First Round; Second Round; Regional Final	West Texas A&M; Abilene Christian; NW Missouri State	W, 55–35; W, 55–41; L, 20–37
2016	First Round	Harding	L, 31–48
2019	First Round; Second Round	Indianapolis; Ferris State	W, 37–27; L, 10–37
2023	First Round; Second Round	Henderson State; Harding	W, 56–14; L, 34–35

== Stadium ==
The Mules have played their home games at Audrey J. Walton Stadium since 1928. The current capacity of the stadium is at 10,000.

== All-time record vs. current MIAA teams ==
Official record (including any NCAA imposed vacates and forfeits) against all current MIAA opponents as of the end of the 2015 season:

Opponent	Won	Lost	Tied	Percentage	Streak	First Meeting
Central Oklahoma	5	1	0	.833	Lost 1	2012
Emporia State	40	19	4	.667	Won 1	1901
Fort Hays State	9	5	0	.643	Lost 1	1964
Lindenwood	7	0	0	1.000	Won 7	2011
Missouri Southern	22	15	2	.590	Won 3	1973
Missouri Western	16	17	1	.485	Won 3	1975
Nebraska–Kearney	7	2	0	.778	Won 5	1960
Northeastern State	5	9	0	.357	Won 5	1962
Northwest Missouri State	34	61	2	.361	Lost 5	1921
Pittsburg State	11	42	2	.218	Won 3	1916
Washburn	28	18	2	.604	Won 5	1902
Totals	183	189	13	.492	Source:	

== Alumni in professional football ==
- Jeff Wright – DT – Drafted by the Buffalo Bills in round 8 of the 1988 NFL draft. Played through 1994 and started at nose tackle in four Super Bowls.
- Colston Weatherington – DE – Drafted in the seventh round of the 2001 NFL draft by the Dallas Cowboys. He was released by the Cowboys in 2003, but signed as a free agent with the Dallas Desperados of the Arena Football League. He was named Defensive Lineman of the Year for the AFL in 2006 and in 2008.
- Toby Korrodi – QB – Signed as an undrafted free agent by the Arizona Cardinals immediately after the 2007 NFL draft. Released in August 2007.
- Roderick Green – OLB – Selected by the Baltimore Ravens in the fifth round of the 2004 NFL draft, the highest any UCM football player has ever been drafted. Green played with the San Francisco 49ers in 2006, where he had 4.5 sacks as a pass-rush specialist.
- Delanie Walker – TE – Selected as the sixth pick of the sixth round in the 2006 NFL draft by the San Francisco 49ers.
- Todd Devoe – WR – Signed onto the Baltimore Ravens practice squad in 2003. Also spent time on the practice squads of the Tennessee Titans and Miami Dolphins. In 2005, he signed with the Denver Broncos and had nine catches, including one touchdown.
- Dennis Gile – QB- Mules quarterback from 2001 to 2002. Played for several professional teams
- Dominick Puni — G — Selected as the 86th overall pick in the 2024 NFL draft by the San Francisco 49ers. Played for the Mules from 2018-2021 before transferring to University of Kansas.
