= Armon Hatcher =

American football player (born 1976)

No. 29
- Position: Defensive back

Personal information
- Born: July 15, 1976 (age 50); Diamond Bar, California, U.S.
- Listed height: 6 ft 0 in (1.83 m)
- Listed weight: 212 lb (96 kg)

Career information
- High school: Diamond Bar
- College: Oregon State
- NFL draft: 1999: 6th round, 194th overall pick

Career history
- Buffalo Bills (1999)*; BC Lions (2000)*; San Diego Chargers (2000); Amsterdam Admirals (2001); Frankfurt Galaxy (2002)
- * Offseason or practice squad member only

Career NFL statistics
- Games played: 4
- Tackles: 4
- Stats at Pro Football Reference

Armon Merrell Hatcher (born July 15, 1976) is an American former professional football player who was a defensive back for one season with the San Diego Chargers of the National Football League (NFL). He played college football for the Oregon State Beavers.

== Early life and college ==
Armon Hatcher was born on July 15, 1976, in Diamond Bar, California. He went to high school there before playing college football at Oregon State University. He spent five years with the Beavers, redshirting his first year and lettering as a safety the next four seasons. He played in all 44 games over four seasons, making 222 tackles and 13 interceptions, including one returned for a touchdown. His 13 interceptions ranked 2nd in Oregon State history. In addition to playing defense, he was the team's kick returner, leading the Pac-10 Conference for returns in 1996. He received a bachelor's degree in business administration in 1999.

== Professional career ==
Pre-draft measurables
| Height | Weight | Hand span | 40-yard dash | 10-yard split | 20-yard split | 20-yard shuttle | Three-cone drill | Vertical jump |
|---|---|---|---|---|---|---|---|---|
| 6 ft 0 in (1.83 m) | 215 lb (98 kg) | 10 in (0.25 m) | 4.62 s | 1.64 s | 2.72 s | 4.20 s | 7.23 s | 36 in (0.91 m) |
All values from NFL Scouting Combine

Hatcher was selected by the Buffalo Bills as the 194th pick in the sixth round of the 1999 NFL draft. Even though he played strong safety in all four of his college seasons, he was converted to free safety upon joining the Bills. He was released at roster cuts.

He was signed by the BC Lions of the Canadian Football League (CFL) on June 16, 2000. He was released a week later.

Later in the year he was signed by the San Diego Chargers. He spent most of the season on the practice squad, but did play in four games. In the first game, a 17–16 win over the Kansas City Chiefs, Hatcher recorded one statistic, a five-yard penalty. The game would be his only NFL win, as his next three games (and every other Chargers game in the season) were each losses. He was given the most playing time in a week 17 loss against the Pittsburgh Steelers, where he recorded 3 tackles.

Hatcher was sent to NFL Europe the following year, playing in ten games for the Amsterdam Admirals. He made 34 tackles with the Admirals.

He was released by the Chargers at roster cuts in 2001.

His final team was the Frankfurt Galaxy in 2002. He appeared in ten games for the NFL Europe team, making 24 tackles. He also scored his only career touchdown with them, on a 100-yard return against the Barcelona Dragons.

== Personal life ==
His cousin, Billy Hatcher, spent 11 seasons in Major League Baseball (MLB).

After Hatcher's sports career he operated a marketing company from 2002 to 2009. He became a coach at Ohio Northern University in August 2009. He was given the assistant defensive backs coach position as well as the freshmen team defensive coordinator role.
