= Renard Cox =

American football player (born 1978)

No. 36
- Position: Cornerback

Personal information
- Born: March 3, 1978 (age 48); Richmond, Virginia
- Listed height: 6 ft 0 in (1.83 m)
- Listed weight: 188 lb (85 kg)

Career information
- High school: Huguenot (Richmond)
- College: Maryland
- NFL draft: 2000: undrafted

Career history
- Arizona Cardinals (2000)*; Scottish Claymores (2001); New Orleans Saints (2001)*; Jacksonville Jaguars (2001); Barcelona Dragons (2002–2003); Hamilton Tiger-Cats (2004–2007)
- * Offseason or practice squad member only

Career NFL statistics
- Games played: 5
- Stats at Pro Football Reference

Renard Cox (born March 3, 1978) is an American former professional football player who was a defensive back in the National Football League (NFL) and Canadian Football League (CFL). He played college football for the Maryland Terrapins. He played in the NFL for the Jacksonville Jaguars in 2001 and in the CFL for the Hamilton Tiger-Cats from 2004 to 2007.
