= McCollum High School =

Location
- 500 West Formosa Boulevard; San Antonio, Texas 78221; United States; 29°20′37″N 98°30′42″W

Information
- School type: Public, high school
- Established: September 1962
- Locale: City: Large
- School district: Harlandale ISD
- NCES School ID: 482247002263
- Principal: Richard Marroquin
- Faculty: 97.75 (on an FTE basis)
- Grades: 9‍–‍12
- Enrollment: 1,466 (2023‍–‍2024)
- Student to teacher ratio: 15.00
- Colors: Kelly green and Vegas gold
- Athletics conference: UIL Class 5A
- Mascot: Cowboy
- Rivals: Harlandale Indians
- Website: www.harlandale.net/o/mhs

Dillard McCollum High School is a public high school in San Antonio, Texas in the Harlandale Independent School District. It is classified as a 5A school by the University Interscholastic League (UIL). During 2022‍–‍2023, McCollum High School had an enrollment of 1,494 students and a student to teacher ratio of 14.13. The school received an overall rating of "C" from the Texas Education Agency for the 2024‍–‍2025 school year.

== History ==
The school was named in honor of Dillard McCollum, who served in the community as a student, teacher, principal, and superintendent for twenty years.

== Frontier Bowl ==
The annual Frontier Bowl is one of the oldest and fiercest high school football rivalry games. It pits the Harlandale High School Indians against the McCollum High School Cowboys at Memorial Stadium. The match-up has a 50-year history.

== Accomplishments ==
- In 1972, McCollum was chosen as the Bellamy Award recipient. Only one high school is chosen in the United States each year, with a 50-year rotation for each state.
- In 1992, Clifton Bennett won the state championship in editorial writing.
- In 2022, the McCollum Indoor Percussion placed 1st in the TECA State Championship for Indoor Percussion.
- In 2022, the McCollum Color Guard placed 1st in the TECA State Championship for Color Guard.
- In 2022, the McCollum Band received Sweepstakes in UIL for both their Concert and Wind Ensemble Band.

== McCollum Cowboy Band and Color Guard ==
The McCollum Cowboy Band boasts 120+ members as of 2026 and consistently scores a UIL division rating of 1 in both Concert and Marching Band. A part of the McCollum band is the Color Guard, which placed 1st in the TECA State Championships (2022). The McCollum Band also is known for going viral in a Fiesta video featuring their rendition of "El Baile de la Gorila (2017). The McCollum Band is currently headed by Gilbert Borrego, Briann Jasso, and Matthew settles.

Show	Year
Matador	2026
Reframed	2025
You Are My Star	2024
Game Of Thrones	2023
Angels In The Architecture	2022
Medusa	2021
Phantom Of The Opera	2020
We Come In Peace	2019
Earth Speaks	2018
Fused	2017
Animal Farm	2016
Dia de Los Muertos	2015
Exodus	2014

== Clubs ==
- McCollum Cowboy Band
- Color Guard
- Golds Stars Dance Team
- Cyber Security Club
- National Honor Society
- National Technical Honor Society
- Business Professionals of America
- Anime Club
- Art Club
- Auto Tech
- Bowling Club
- Spanish Club
- French Club
- ASL Club
- HOSA
- VICA
- Drama Club
- Robotics Club
- Math Club
- Media Club
- J.R.O.T.C
- Gamma Sigma Girls
- TAFE

== Athletics ==
The McCollum Cowboys compete in the following sports:

- Baseball
- Basketball
- Cross country
- Football
- Golf
- Soccer
- Softball
- Tennis
- Track and field
- Volleyball
- Marching Band

State Title

- Volleyball
  - 1976(4A)

== The Leadership School ==
The School of Leadership and Public Service (SLPS) is a magnet program on campus at McCollum High School. The department chair is currently Yvonne Valdez. The program requires numerous hours of community service and encourages students to take on leadership positions throughout the school.

== Notable alumni ==
- Jonathan Joss (Class of 1983), is an actor and the voice of John Redcorn in the animated series King of the Hill
- Emilio Navaira (Class of 1980), was a Mexican-American musician who performed country and Tejano music
- Yolanda Saldívar (Class of 1979), is the convicted murderer of Latin music superstar Selena, and is currently serving a life sentence in the Texas Department of Criminal Justice.
- Belinda Jane Ortega (Class of 1983), former Dance Team member and author of Hereafter, a suspense novel of love, faith and redemption. Tiltwood Press, 2026. She was the editor of CheckIn, a newsletter of the San Antonio Metropolitan Methodist Hospital and guest columnist for Methodist Magazine, Spring 2021.
- Carlos Uresti (Class of 1981) is the current Texas State Senator from Senate District 19. He is also a former Texas State Representative and a San Antonio attorney.

== Principals ==
Name	Years of service
George Vakey	Fall 1962 to spring 1967
William Patrick Shannon	Fall 1967 to spring 1975
Darrell N. Flynt	Fall 1975 to spring 1988
Virginia Aguilar	Fall 1988 to spring 1995
Dr. Syl Perez	Fall 1995 to spring 1997
Robert Pacheco	Spring 1997 to summer 1997
Henry Galindo	Fall 1997 to spring 2001
David Stelmazewski	Fall 2001 to spring 2008
Diana Sz. Casas	Fall 2008 to spring 2011
Aracelie Bunsen	Fall 2011 to spring 2016
Jacob Garcia	Fall 2016 to spring 2020
Richard Marroquin	Fall 2020 to 2024
Jacob Salinas	Fall 2024 to spring 2025
Julia Gimbal	Fall 2025–present
