= Delvin Brown =

American football player (born 1979)

No. 24
- Position: Defensive back

Personal information
- Born: September 17, 1979 (age 47); Miami, Florida
- Listed height: 5 ft 11 in (1.80 m)
- Listed weight: 202 lb (92 kg)

Career information
- High school: Miami Gardens (FL) Miami Carol City
- College: Miami (FL)

Career history
- Jacksonville Jaguars (2001); Frankfurt Galaxy (2002)
- Stats at Pro Football Reference

Delvin Brown (born September 17, 1979) is an American former football defensive back. He played for the Jacksonville Jaguars in 2001.
