= Dondre Gilliam =

American gridiron football player (born 1977)

No. 86, 10
- Position: Wide receiver

Personal information
- Born: February 9, 1977 (age 49); Baltimore, Maryland, U.S.
- Listed height: 6 ft 0 in (1.83 m)
- Listed weight: 185 lb (84 kg)

Career information
- High school: Aberdeen (Aberdeen, Maryland)
- College: Millersville
- NFL draft: 2001: undrafted

Career history
- San Diego Chargers (2001–2003); → Scottish Claymores (2002); Hamilton Tiger-Cats (2004–2005)

Career NFL statistics
- Receptions: 6
- Receiving yards: 95
- Stats at Pro Football Reference
- Stats at CFL.ca (archive)

Dondre A. Gilliam (born February 9, 1977) is an American former professional football player who was a wide receiver for two seasons with the San Diego Chargers of the National Football League (NFL). He was also a member of the Scottish Claymores and Hamilton Tiger-Cats. He played college football for the Millersville Marauders

== Early life ==
Gilliam attended Aberdeen High School in Aberdeen, Maryland. He first enrolled at Cheyney University of Pennsylvania before transferring to Millersville University of Pennsylvania.

== Professional career ==
Gilliam was signed by the NFL's San Diego Chargers on April 24, 2001, after going undrafted in the 2001 NFL draft. He was allocated on January 28, 2002, to NFL Europe, where he played for the Scottish Claymores. He was released by the Chargers on September 1 and signed to the Chargers' practice squad on September 2, 2002. Gilliam was signed to the active roster on November 14, 2002. He was released by the Chargers on November 19 and signed to the team's practice squad on November 20, 2002. He was released by the Chargers on August 26, 2003. Gilliam signed with the Chargers on September 26, 2003. He became an unrestricted free agent in March 2004. He was released by the Chargers on October 22, 2003, and signed to the Chargers' practice squad the same day. He was released by the Chargers on November 14 and signed to the team's practice squad on November 26, 2003. Gilliam was signed to the active roster on December 21, 2003.

Gilliam signed with the Hamilton Tiger-Cats of the CFL on August 17, 2004. He was released by the Tiger-Cats on May 28, 2006.
