= Darnell Alford =

American football player (born 1977)

No. 72, 74
- Position: Offensive tackle

Personal information
- Born: June 11, 1977 (age 49); Newark, New Jersey, U.S.
- Listed height: 6 ft 4 in (1.93 m)
- Listed weight: 328 lb (149 kg)

Career information
- High school: Chancellor (Fredericksburg, Virginia)
- College: Boston College (1995–1999)
- NFL draft: 2000: 6th round, 188th overall pick

Career history
- Kansas City Chiefs (2000–2001); → Berlin Thunder (2002); Green Bay Packers (2002)*; New York Jets (2002); Dallas Cowboys (2002); Kansas City Chiefs (2002–2003); St. Louis Rams (2004); New Orleans Saints (2006)*
- * Offseason or practice squad member only

Career NFL statistics
- Games played: 5
- Games started: 0
- Stats at Pro Football Reference

Darnell LaShawn Alford (born June 11, 1977) is an American former professional football player who was an offensive tackle for the Kansas City Chiefs and New York Jets of the National Football League (NFL). He was selected by the Chiefs in the sixth round of the 2000 NFL draft after playing college football for the Boston College Eagles. He played for the Chiefs from 2000 to 2001 and for the Jets in 2002. Alford was also a member of the Green Bay Packers, Dallas Cowboys, St. Louis Rams, and New Orleans Saints but did not appear in any games for any of those teams.

== Early life ==
Darnell LaShawn Alford was born on June 11, 1977 in Newark, New Jersey. He played high school football at Chancellor High School in Fredericksburg, Virginia and earned all-state honors his senior year.

== College career ==
Alford played college football for the Boston College Eagles from 1995 to 1999. He was redshirted in 1995. He lettered for the Eagles in 1996, 1998 and 1999. He did not play in 1997 due to personal reasons.

== Professional career ==
Alford was selected by the Kansas City Chiefs in the sixth round, with the 188th overall pick, of the 2000 NFL draft. He officially signed with the team on July 20. He played in one game for the Chiefs in 2000 and two games in 2001. In 2002, Alford was allocated to NFL Europe to play for the Berlin Thunder. He appeared in nine games, all starts, for the Thunder during the 2002 NFL Europe season. He was waived by the Chiefs on September 1, 2002.

Alford was signed to the practice squad of the Green Bay Packers on September 4, 2002.

On September 9, 2002, he was signed to the New York Jets' active roster off of the Packers' practice squad. He played in two games for the Jets before being waived on November 18, 2002.

Alford was claimed off waivers by the Dallas Cowboys on November 19, 2002. He was waived on December 10, 2002 without appearing in any games for the Cowboys.

He signed with the Chiefs again on December 12, 2002. He became a free agent after the season and re-signed with the Chiefs on March 31, 2003. Alford was waived by the Chiefs again on August 31, and signed to the team's practice squad on September 2, where he spent the entire 2003 season. He re-signed with the Chiefs on February 11, 2004. Alford was waived on September 5 and signed to the Chiefs' practice squad again on September 7, 2004.

On September 8, 2004, he was signed to the St. Louis Rams' active roster off of the Chiefs' practice squad. He did not play in any games during the 2004 season and later re-signed with the Rams on March 9, 2005. Alford was released on September 3, 2005.

He signed with the New Orleans Saints on July 24, 2006. He was released by the Saints on August 23, 2006.
