= Hurley Tarver =

American gridiron football player (born 1975)

No. 40, 29, 5
- Position: Defensive back

Personal information
- Born: November 30, 1975 (age 50); Fort Worth, Texas, U.S.
- Listed height: 6 ft 0 in (1.83 m)
- Listed weight: 190 lb (86 kg)

Career information
- High school: Benbrook (TX) Western Hills
- College: Central Oklahoma
- NFL draft: 1998: undrafted

Career history
- San Francisco 49ers (1998)*; Cleveland Browns (1999)*; Scottish Claymores (2000, 2002); Dallas Cowboys (2000)*; Las Vegas Outlaws (2001); Green Bay Packers (2001–2002)*; Tampa Bay Storm (2003); Chicago Rush (2004); Toronto Argonauts (2004); Las Vegas Gladiators (2005)
- * Offseason or practice squad member only

Awards and highlights
- ArenaBowl champion (2003); Grey Cup champion (2004)
- Stats at ArenaFan.com

Hurley Tarver (born November 30, 1975) is an American former professional football defensive back. He played college football at the University of Central Oklahoma and attended Western Hills High School in Benbrook, Texas. He was a member of the San Francisco 49ers, Cleveland Browns, Scottish Claymores, Dallas Cowboys, Las Vegas Outlaws, Green Bay Packers, Tampa Bay Storm, Chicago Rush, Toronto Argonauts and Las Vegas Gladiators.

== Early life ==
Tarver participated in football, basketball and track and field for the Western Hills High School Cougars. He was a first-team all-district and all-American safety. He was also the triple jump all-district champion.

== College career ==
Tarver played college football for the Central Oklahoma Bronchos. He recorded 57 tackles, 2 interceptions, one fumble recovery and 9 passes defended his senior year. He was also an all-regional second-team and all-American honorable mention selection. He recorded 62 tackles, 4 interception and 12 passes defended his junior year.

== Professional career ==
Tarver signed with the San Francisco 49ers in April 1998 after going undrafted in the 1998 NFL draft. He was released by the 49ers on August 25, 1998.

Tarver was a member of the Cleveland Browns in 1999 before being released on July 1, 1999.

Tarver signed with the Dallas Cowboys on August 9, 2000. He was released by the Cowboys on August 27, 2000.

Tarver was drafted by the Las Vegas Outlaws of the XFL in the fourteenth round with the 108th pick of the 2001 XFL draft.

Tarver was signed by the Green Bay Packers on April 20, 2001, released on June 5, re-signed on August 23, released again on September 2, signed to the team's practice squad on September 3, and released again on December 27, 2001. He re-signed with the Packers on April 15, 2002 but was released on September 2, 2002. Tarver was later signed to the Packers' practice squad on January 1, 2003.

Tarver signed with the Tampa Bay Storm of the Arena Football League (AFL) on December 31, 2002. He was placed on recallable waivers by the Storm on January 30, 2004.

Tarver was signed by the Chicago Rush of the AFL on February 19, 2004. He was released by the Rush on June 2, 2004.

Tarver signed with the Toronto Argonauts of the Canadian Football League on September 20, 2004. He was released by the Argonauts on June 13, 2005.

Tarver was signed by the AFL's Las Vegas Gladiators on March 17, 2005.
