= Dane Looker =

American football player (born 1976)

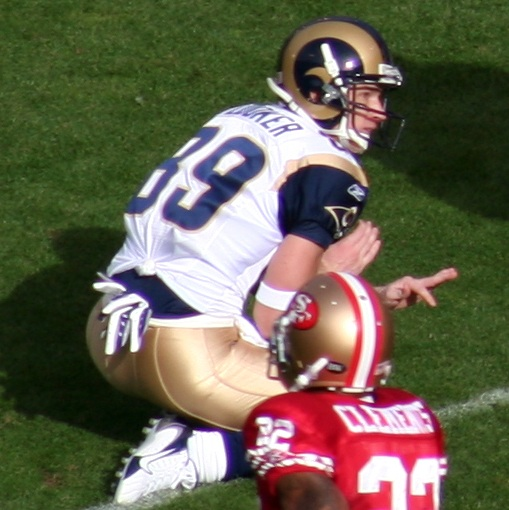
- Looker with the St. Louis Rams in 2007

No. 89
- Position: Wide receiver

Personal information
- Born: May 5, 1976 (age 50); Puyallup, Washington, U.S.
- Listed height: 6 ft 0 in (1.83 m)
- Listed weight: 194 lb (88 kg)

Career information
- High school: Puyallup
- College: Washington (1996–1999)
- NFL draft: 2000: undrafted

Career history
- St. Louis Rams (2000)*; New England Patriots (2000); St. Louis Rams (2001–2008); → Berlin Thunder (2002); Detroit Lions (2009)*
- * Offseason or practice squad member only

Awards and highlights
- World Bowl champion (X); All-NFL Europe (2002); St. Louis Rams 10th Anniversary Team

Career NFL statistics
- Receptions: 112
- Receiving yards: 1,224
- Receiving touchdowns: 5
- Stats at Pro Football Reference

Dane Alan Looker (born May 5, 1976) is an American former professional football player who was a wide receiver in the National Football League (NFL). He played college football for the Washington Huskies. Looker was signed by the St. Louis Rams as an undrafted free agent in 2000. He also played for the New England Patriots and Detroit Lions. After his playing career, he became a member of the school board in Puyallup, Washington.

== Early life ==
Looker attended Puyallup High School in Puyallup, Washington, and won varsity letters in football and basketball. In football, he won All-State honors and made 50 receptions for 916 yards and 18 touchdowns as a senior. He won two varsity letters in basketball and graduated in 1995 with honors.

== College career ==
Looker played college football at the University of Washington where he made 84 catches for 949 yards. Looker was a walk-on to the University of Washington football team in 1996 after playing basketball for two years at Western Washington University. He was named honorable mention All-Pac-10 as a senior after starting seven of 11 games, making 20 receptions for 287 yards. He led the Huskies with 64 receptions for 662 yards as a junior. He graduated with a degree in speech communications. During his time at Washington, he played under Scott Linehan, who was initially the wide receivers coach and later the offensive coordinator.

== Professional career ==
Pre-draft measurables
Height	Weight
6 ft 0 1/4 in (1.84 m)	190 lb (86 kg)
Values from Pro Day

=== First stint with Rams ===
Looker was signed as an undrafted free agent by the St. Louis Rams on April 17, 2000. Looker spent 2000 training camp with the Rams before being traded to the New England Patriots on August 7.

=== New England Patriots ===
Looker made the final opening day roster with the Patriots but was listed as inactive. On November 16, 2000, the Patriots placed Looker on injured reserve due to a leg injury. On July 31, 2001, the Patriots waived Looker.

=== Second stint with Rams ===
The Rams signed Looker on August 8, 2001, and waived Looker on August 27, 2001. The Rams re-signed Looker on February 12, 2002, and assigned Looker to the NFL Europe team Berlin Thunder.

Looker led Berlin to a World Bowl title and was named World Bowl Most Valuable Player after catching 11 passes for 111 yards and two touchdowns, as Berlin defeated the Rhein Fire 26–20. He was named to All-NFL Europe team and led all NFL Europe receivers in receptions (54) and receiving yards (661) during the regular season, he also scored five touchdowns.

After playing in three preseason games in 2002, Looker signed with the Rams practice squad on September 9, 2002, and to the active roster on December 12. Looker played his first regular season NFL game on December 15 in the Rams' game against the Arizona Cardinals, on both offense and special teams. Looker played in the Rams' two final games of 2002 as well. In 2003, he received significant offensive action, emerging as the Rams' third receiver with 47 receptions. His first touchdown reception came on September 14, 2003, on a 19-yard reception from quarterback Marc Bulger.

Looker played in 14 games of the 2004 season. On the October 10 away game against the Seattle Seahawks, the Seattle-area native Looker made a critical, out-of-bounds 16-yard catch to bring the Rams to the 18-yard line and set up a game-tying field goal late in the fourth quarter. The Rams would win 33–27. In 2005, he caught 23 passes for 237 yards. In 2006 Looker handled holder duties all 16 games and also returned punts. In 2007, he played in 13 games serving as holder in each of the contests and made six receptions for 38 yards and Rams' 2007 recipient of the Ed Block Courage Award. In 2008 Looker played 13 games with 6 starts and made 23 receptions for 271 yards, and 11.8-yard average and 2 touchdowns.

The head coach of the Rams during 2006, 2007, and 2008 seasons was Scott Linehan, for whom Looker had previously played at the University of Washington.

Looker's contract with the Rams expired at the end of the 2008 season making him a free agent.

=== Detroit Lions ===
The Detroit Lions signed Looker on August 17, 2009, after the team waived wide receiver Bobby Sippio. Scott Linehan was by then the Lions offensive coordinator. In three preseason games, Looker made 6 receptions for 65 yards. However Looker was released a few weeks later on September 5, 2009.

== NFL career statistics ==
Legend
**Bold**	Career high

=== Regular season ===
Year	Team	Games		Receiving					
Year	Team	GP	GS	Tgt	Rec	Yds	Avg	Lng	TD
2002	STL	3	0	0	0	0	0.0	0	0
2003	STL	**16**	2	**75**	**47**	**495**	10.5	**41**	**3**
2004	STL	14	0	26	13	183	**14.1**	29	0
2005	STL	**16**	0	27	23	237	10.3	23	0
2006	STL	**16**	0	2	0	0	0.0	0	0
2007	STL	13	0	14	6	38	6.3	10	0
2008	STL	13	**6**	47	23	271	11.8	30	2
		91	8	191	112	1,224	10.9	41	5

=== Playoffs ===
Year	Team	Games		Receiving					
Year	Team	GP	GS	Tgt	Rec	Yds	Avg	Lng	TD
2003	STL	1	0	4	2	31	**15.5**	**24**	0
2004	STL	**2**	0	**5**	**3**	**38**	12.7	15	0
		3	0	9	5	69	13.8	24	0

== Political career ==
Dane Looker

Puyallup, Washington School Board Position #2, Director
- Incumbent
- Assumed office December 12, 2011
- Preceded by: Cindy Poysnick

Personal details
- Born: Dane Alan Looker; May 5, 1976 (age 50) Puyallup, Washington
- Party: Republican
- Spouse: Amy Clancy Looker
- Children: 4
- Education: University of Washington (B.A., speech communication)
- Occupation: American football player, high school sports coach

Initially Looker was planning to run for the Puyallup, Washington School Board but "decided to suspend his campaign believing a seat in the state legislature will put him in a better position to improve our local schools." Looker intended to run on a Republican ticket. Following the primary election, in which Looker qualified for the general election for the Puyallup School Board position, he re-entered the race for the School Board seat. He won the general election and was installed as a member of the Puyallup School Board on December 12, 2011.

== Personal life ==
Looker has a wife, Amy Clancy Looker, who is a teacher at Kalles Junior High and head coach of the Rogers High School girls' basketball team. They have four children, including sons named Isaac, Lawson, and Tate born in July 2011, and a daughter named Shae, born in October 2004 and live in the Summit-Waller community of Tacoma, Washington.

== See also ==
- Washington Huskies football statistical leaders
