= Cedric Pittman =

American football player (born 1977)

No. 98
- Positions: Offensive lineman, defensive lineman

Personal information
- Born: June 8, 1977 (age 49); Colorado Springs, Colorado, U.S.
- Listed height: 6 ft 3 in (1.91 m)
- Listed weight: 275 lb (125 kg)

Career information
- High school: Doherty (Colorado Springs, Colorado)
- College: Nevada
- NFL draft: 1998: undrafted

Career history
- Detroit Lions (1998)*; New York Giants (2000–2001)*; Birmingham Thunderbolts (2001); Scottish Claymores (2002); Tampa Bay Buccaneers (2002)*; San Jose SaberCats (2003); Las Vegas Gladiators (2004)
- * Offseason or practice squad member only
- Stats at ArenaFan.com

Cedric Pittman (born June 18, 1977) is an American former football defensive end and arena football offensive / defensive lineman. He played college football at San Jose City College and Nevada.

== Professional career ==
After going unselected in the 1998 NFL draft, Pittman signed with the Detroit Lions. In April 2000, he joined the New York Giants. Where he spent 2000 and 2001. He also played for the Birmingham Thunderbolts of the short-lived XFL. He then played for the Scottish Claymores of NFL Europe in 2002, leading the Claymores in sacks with four. After the NFL Europe season ended, he was signed by the Tampa Bay Buccaneers. Then, in 2003, he joined the San Jose SaberCats of the Arena Football League (AFL). He then spent 2004 with the Las Vegas Gladiators.
