= Todd Husak =

American football player (born 1978)

No. 7, 8
- Position: Quarterback

Personal information
- Born: July 6, 1978 (age 48); Bryan, Texas, U.S.
- Listed height: 6 ft 3 in (1.91 m)
- Listed weight: 216 lb (98 kg)

Career information
- High school: St. John Bosco (Bellflower, California)
- College: Stanford
- NFL draft: 2000: 6th round, 202nd overall pick

Career history
- Washington Redskins (2000); New York Jets (2001)*; Denver Broncos (2001); Berlin Thunder (2002); New York Jets (2002); Cleveland Browns (2004)*
- * Offseason or practice squad member only

Awards and highlights
- World Bowl champion (X); First-team All-Pac-10 (1999); Hula Bowl co-MVP (2000)

Career NFL statistics
- TD–INT: 0–0
- Passing yards: −2
- Passer rating: 79.2
- Stats at Pro Football Reference

Todd Larkin Husak (born July 6, 1978) is an American former professional football player who was a quarterback in the National Football League (NFL). He played college football for the Stanford Cardinal. He played his only NFL game for the Washington Redskins.

== Early life ==
Husak was born in College Station, Texas, moved to Long Beach, California when he was 2 years old and graduated from St. John Bosco High School in Bellflower, California.

== College career ==
Husak played college football at Stanford University and, as the starting quarterback, led the Cardinal to the Rose Bowl in 2000. It was the school's first such appearance since 1972. Husak was named first-team All-Pac-10 for the 1999 season, when he led Stanford to the Rose Bowl. He was also named co-Most Valuable Player of the 2000 Hula Bowl. Husak threw for 6,564 yards and 41 touchdowns while at Stanford, ranking him fifth all-time for both passing and touchdowns among Stanford quarterbacks.

== Professional career ==
Husak was drafted in the sixth round of the 2000 NFL draft with the 202nd overall pick by the Washington Redskins, for whom he saw limited action that season. After his time with the Redskins, he spent a few years in the NFL as an offseason or practice squad member of the Denver Broncos, New York Jets, and Cleveland Browns. He also spent one season with the Berlin Thunder of NFL Europa, and led the Thunder to the league championship in World Bowl X in 2002.

== Life after the NFL ==
Husak retired from professional football in 2004. In 2005, he served as a graduate assistant football coach at Stanford, working with tight ends.

Beginning with the 2008 college football season, Husak began serving as the color commentator for Stanford football radio broadcasts. He served as the color commentator for 15 years before stepping away to focus on his real estate career.
