= Marcus Williams (tight end) =

American football player (born 1977)

No. 85
- Position: Tight end

Personal information
- Born: December 12, 1977 (age 48); Oakland, California, U.S.
- Listed height: 6 ft 5 in (1.96 m)
- Listed weight: 230 lb (104 kg)

Career information
- High school: Berkeley (Berkeley, California)
- College: Washington State
- NFL draft: 2001: undrafted

Career history
- Indianapolis Colts (2001)*; Oakland Raiders (2001–2003); → Amsterdam Admirals (2002); → Frankfurt Galaxy (2002)
- * Offseason or practice squad member only

Career NFL statistics
- Games played: 14
- Tackles: 11
- Stats at Pro Football Reference

Marcus A. Williams Jr. (born December 12, 1977) is an American former professional football tight end played in the National Football League (NFL) for one season with the Oakland Raiders. Signed to the Raiders' active roster in 2002, Williams' career came to an abrupt end due to injuries sustained from being punched by teammate Bill Romanowski during the 2003 training camp. Williams later sued Romanowski and won over $300,000 in damages.

== Early life and college ==
Born in Oakland, California, Williams graduated from Berkeley High School in nearby Berkeley. He began his college football career at the junior college level at Laney College in Oakland in 1997. After two seasons at Laney, Williams transferred to Washington State University, where he majored in humanities and played for the Washington State Cougars in 1999 and 2000 under head coach Mike Price. At Washington State, Williams played at wide receiver and had 61 receptions for 1,086 yards and eight touchdowns.

== Professional career ==
Pre-draft measurables
Height	Weight	40-yard dash	10-yard split	20-yard split	20-yard shuttle	Vertical jump
6 ft 5 in (1.96 m)	230 lb (104 kg)	4.56 s	1.57 s	2.63 s	4.20 s	41.0 in (1.04 m)

Williams was not selected in the 2001 NFL draft. The Indianapolis Colts signed Williams as a free agent on April 27, 2001, and released him on August 27. On December 5, 2001, the Oakland Raiders signed Williams to the practice squad.

The Raiders designated Williams to the Amsterdam Admirals of NFL Europe on February 11, 2002. Due to a back injury, Williams sat out the first two weeks of the NFL Europe season. On week three, Williams was reassigned to the Frankfurt Galaxy, and he made his debut on April 27 against the Scottish Claymores. Williams played five games off the bench at tight end, during which he had one reception, a two-yard touchdown. On September 28, 2002, Williams signed with the Oakland Raiders, playing 14 games off the bench and making 11 special teams tackles during a season when the Raiders won the AFC title. His season ended on January 23, 2003, when he was placed on injured reserve.

During training camp on August 24, 2003, teammate Bill Romanowski took Williams' helmet off and punched him in the face, breaking his left eye socket and chipping a tooth. Williams was again placed on injured reserve, and he filed a civil lawsuit against Romanowski in Alameda County Superior Court in October 2003. On March 22, 2005, a jury awarded Williams $340,000, specifically $300,000 for the salary that Williams would have made in 2003 and $40,000 for medical expenses. Romanowski paid Williams an additional $75,000 settlement on May 27 that year.
