= Gene Dahlquist =

American gridiron football player and coach (born 1942)

Biographical details
- Born: December 31, 1942 (age 83); Mount Prospect, Illinois, U.S.
- Education: University of Arizona; Idaho State University

Playing career
- 1960–1964: Arizona
- 1965–1966: Norfolk Neptunes
- Positions: Quarterback, punter

Coaching career (HC unless noted)
- 1968–1970: Idaho State (WR)
- 1971–1973: Utah (WR)
- 1974–1976: Oregon (OC/QB)
- 1977–1982: Boise State (OC/QB)
- 1983–1986: Iowa State (OC)
- 1988–1991: Illinois (OC)
- 1992–1997: Texas (OC)
- 1999: UNLV (PGC/QB)
- 2001–2003: Scottish Claymores
- 2012: Omaha Nighthawks (QB)
- 2014–2015: Winnipeg Blue Bombers (QB)
- 2019: Pioneros de Querétaro

Head coaching record
- Overall: 15–15

Eugene M. Dahlquist (born December 31, 1942) is an American gridiron football coach and former player. Dahlquist was the head coach for the Scottish Claymores of NFL Europe from 2001 to 2003, compiling a record of 15–15. Prior to his professional career, he worked 31 years in the collegiate ranks. Dahlquist served as the offensive coordinator at five different schools: Oregon, Boise State, Iowa State, Illinois, and Texas. He returned to coaching in 2019 with the Pioneros de Querétaro in Mexico, but he left the team after two games citing personal reasons.

Originally from Mount Prospect, Illinois, Dahlquist played quarterback at Arizona and later for the Norfolk Neptunes in the Continental Football League.

== Head coaching record ==
Year	Team	Regular season					Postseason			
Year	Team	Won	Lost	Tied	Win %	Finish	Won	Lost	Win %	Result
2001	SCO	4	6	0	.400	4th (League)	–	–	—	—
2002	SCO	5	5	0	.500	4th (League)	–	–	—	—
2003	SCO	6	4	0	.600	3rd (League)	–	–	—	—
Total		15	15	0	.500		–	–	—	
