= Frank M. Tejeda Academy =

Frank M Tejeda Academy

Location
- 12121 South East Loop 410; San Antonio, Texas 78221; United States; 29.322959°N 98.491622°W

Information
- Type: Public high school
- School district: Harlandale Independent School District
- Faculty: 17.71 (FTE)
- Grades: 9-12
- Enrollment: 190 (2022-23)
- Student to teacher ratio: 10.73
- Color
- Website: Official Website

Frank M Tejeda Academy is a secondary alternative school located in San Antonio, Texas, in the Harlandale Independent School District. The school serves all of HISD, which is in southern San Antonio near the Interstate 410. For the 2024-2025 school year, the school was rated "C" by the Texas Education Agency. Frank M Tejeda Academy is an alternative school and does not have school team sports; however, it does offer physical education.
