= Blaine McElmurry =

American football player (born 1973)

No. 38, 45
- Position: Safety

Personal information
- Born: October 23, 1973 (age 53); Helena, Montana, U.S.
- Listed height: 6 ft 0 in (1.83 m)
- Listed weight: 192 lb (87 kg)

Career information
- High school: Troy (Troy, Montana)
- College: Montana
- NFL draft: 1997: undrafted

Career history
- Tennessee Oilers (1997)*; Philadelphia Eagles (1997)*; Green Bay Packers (1997); Tennessee Oilers (1998)*; Jacksonville Jaguars (1998–1999); Scottish Claymores (2000); Amsterdam Admirals (2002); Tennessee Titans (2002)*
- * Offseason or practice squad member only

Career NFL statistics
- Tackles: 30
- Interceptions: 1
- Forced fumbles: 1
- Stats at Pro Football Reference

Blaine Richard McElmurry (born October 23, 1973) is an American former professional football player who was a safety in the National Football League (NFL) for the Green Bay Packers and Jacksonville Jaguars. He played college ball for the Montana Grizzlies and played in the NFL for three seasons. McElmurry played high school football in Troy, Montana, where his father was the acting coach.
