= Jamal Robertson =

American football player (born 1977)

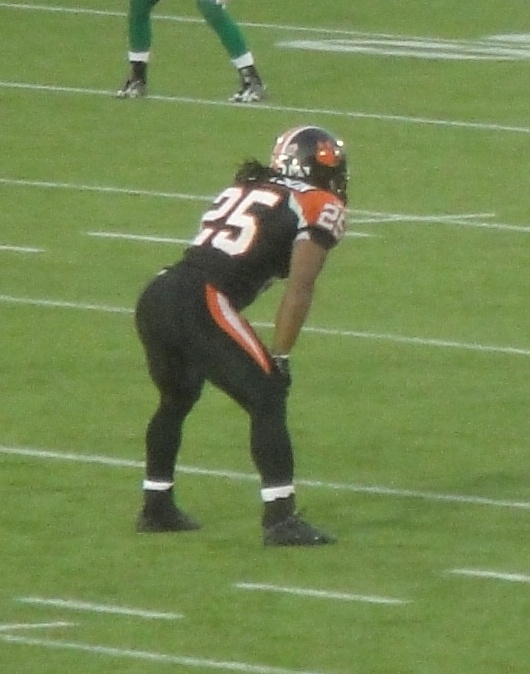
- Robertson with the BC Lions in 2010

No. 22, 25, 42
- Positions: Running back, kick returner

Personal information
- Born: January 10, 1977 (age 49); Washington, D.C., U.S.
- Listed height: 5 ft 9 in (1.75 m)
- Listed weight: 216 lb (98 kg)

Career information
- High school: Stebbins (Riverside, Ohio)
- College: Ohio Northern
- NFL draft: 2001: undrafted

Career history
- Calgary Stampeders (2001)*; San Francisco 49ers (2002–2004); → Rhein Fire (2002); Carolina Panthers (2004–2005); Atlanta Falcons (2006); Saskatchewan Roughriders (2007)*; Toronto Argonauts (2008–2009); BC Lions (2010–2011)
- * Offseason or practice squad member only

Awards and highlights
- Grey Cup champion (2011); NFL Europe Offensive MVP (2002); 2× first-team HP Division III All-American (1999–2000); 2× first-team OAC (1999–2000); OAC co-Offensive Player of the Year (2000)

Career NFL statistics
- Rushing yards: 248
- Yards per carry: 4
- Receptions: 4
- Receiving yards: 34
- Return yards: 1,325
- Total touchdowns: 2
- Stats at Pro Football Reference

Career CFL statistics
- Rushing yards: 2,828
- Rushing average: 5.3
- Receiving yards: 1,297
- Return yards: 593
- Total touchdowns: 29

Jamal Robertson (born January 10, 1977) is an American former professional football player who was a running back and kick returner in the National Football League (NFL) and Canadian Football League (CFL) from 2001 to 2011. He played college football for the Ohio Northern Polar Bears.

Originally from Dayton, Ohio, Robertson was a two-time Division III All-American at Ohio Northern. An undrafted free agent in 2001, he began his professional football career on the practice squad of the CFL team Calgary Stampeders. Robertson then played for five seasons in the NFL, primarily as a kick returner. He signed with the NFL's San Francisco 49ers in early 2002 and played for the NFL Europe team Rhein Fire prior to debuting with the 49ers later that year. From 2004 to 2005, Robertson played for the Carolina Panthers, where he helped the 2005 team advance to the NFC Championship.

After playing briefly for the Atlanta Falcons very late in the 2006 season, Robertson returned to the CFL for his later football career. He played for the Toronto Argonauts from 2008 to 2009 and BC Lions from 2010 to 2011. In his final pro football season, Robertson was part of the 2011 BC Lions team that won the 99th Grey Cup.

== Early life ==
Born in Washington, D. C., Robertson grew up in Dayton, Ohio and graduated from Stebbins High School in nearby Riverside in 1997. He rushed for 2,029 yards his senior year for Stebbins High School, in 1996.

== College career ==
Robertson attended Ohio Northern University and played at running back and kick returner for its NCAA Division III Ohio Northern Polar Bears football team from 1997 to 2000. As a senior in 2000, Robertson led Division III football in all-purpose yards with a school record 2,308 and set a rushing yards record of 1,664. At Ohio Northern, in 1999 and 2000, Robertson earned first-team Hewlett-Packard Division III All-American and All-Ohio Athletic Conference honors both seasons. Following his senior season, Robertson was Ohio Northern's all-time career leader in rushing yards (4,169), all-purpose yards (5,388), and touchdowns (56).

== Professional career ==
=== Early CFL career and NFL Europe (2001–2002) ===
After going undrafted in the 2001 NFL draft, Robertson signed with the Calgary Stampeders of the Canadian Football League (CFL) and spent the 2001 season on the Stampeders' practice squad.

On January 23, 2002, Robertson signed with the NFL team San Francisco 49ers, which allocated him to the Rhein Fire of NFL Europa on February 6. On a Fire team that finished runner-up in World Bowl X, Robertson had eight touchdowns, including an NFL Europe record 90-yard touchdown run, and was eventually named NFL Europe's offensive MVP.

=== San Francisco 49ers (2002–2004) ===
After being inactive for the first five weeks of his NFL debut season of 2002, Robertson played in six games for the 49ers on special teams. He returned 11 kickoffs for 242 yards, including a long of 42 yards, and had one special teams tackle. Due to a hamstring injury, Robertson was placed on injured reserve on December 30. In 2003, Robertson played in nine games off the bench. He had 32 rushing attempts for 136 yards and three special teams tackles.

Robertson played in seven games for the 49ers in 2004, with 25 kick returns for 560 yards and 16 carries for 71 yards, including his first NFL touchdown, a one-yard run against the New Orleans Saints on September 19. Although Robertson's touchdown gave the 49ers a 27–23 lead, Robertson lost a fumble on a later drive, and the Saints scored the game winning touchdown on the resulting drive and won the game 30–27. On November 2, the 49ers waived Robertson.

=== Carolina Panthers (2004–2005) ===
On November 13, 2004, Robertson was signed by the Carolina Panthers as a free agent. In five games, Robertson returned six kickoffs for 180 yards and made one special teams tackle. Robertson made more appearances at running back in 2005 due to injuries to Stephen Davis, DeShaun Foster, and Nick Goings. Playing seven regular season games that season, Robertson had 14 rushing plays for 41 yards and a touchdown and returned 16 kickoffs for 343 yards. Robertson also played in all three of the Panthers' postseason games including the NFC Championship, recording 19 rushing, 27 receiving, and 186 kick return yards. Following the preseason, the Panthers cut Robertson on September 2, 2006.

=== Atlanta Falcons (2006) ===
On December 12, 2006, Robertson was signed by the Atlanta Falcons due to injuries to Warrick Dunn and Jerious Norwood. Robertson appeared in one game for the Falcons. Prior to the preseason, Robertson was released on August 8, 2007.

=== Later CFL career (2007–2011) ===
Due to injuries to running backs Corey Holmes, Wes Cates, and Josh Ranek the Saskatchewan Roughriders signed Robertson on November 14, 2007.

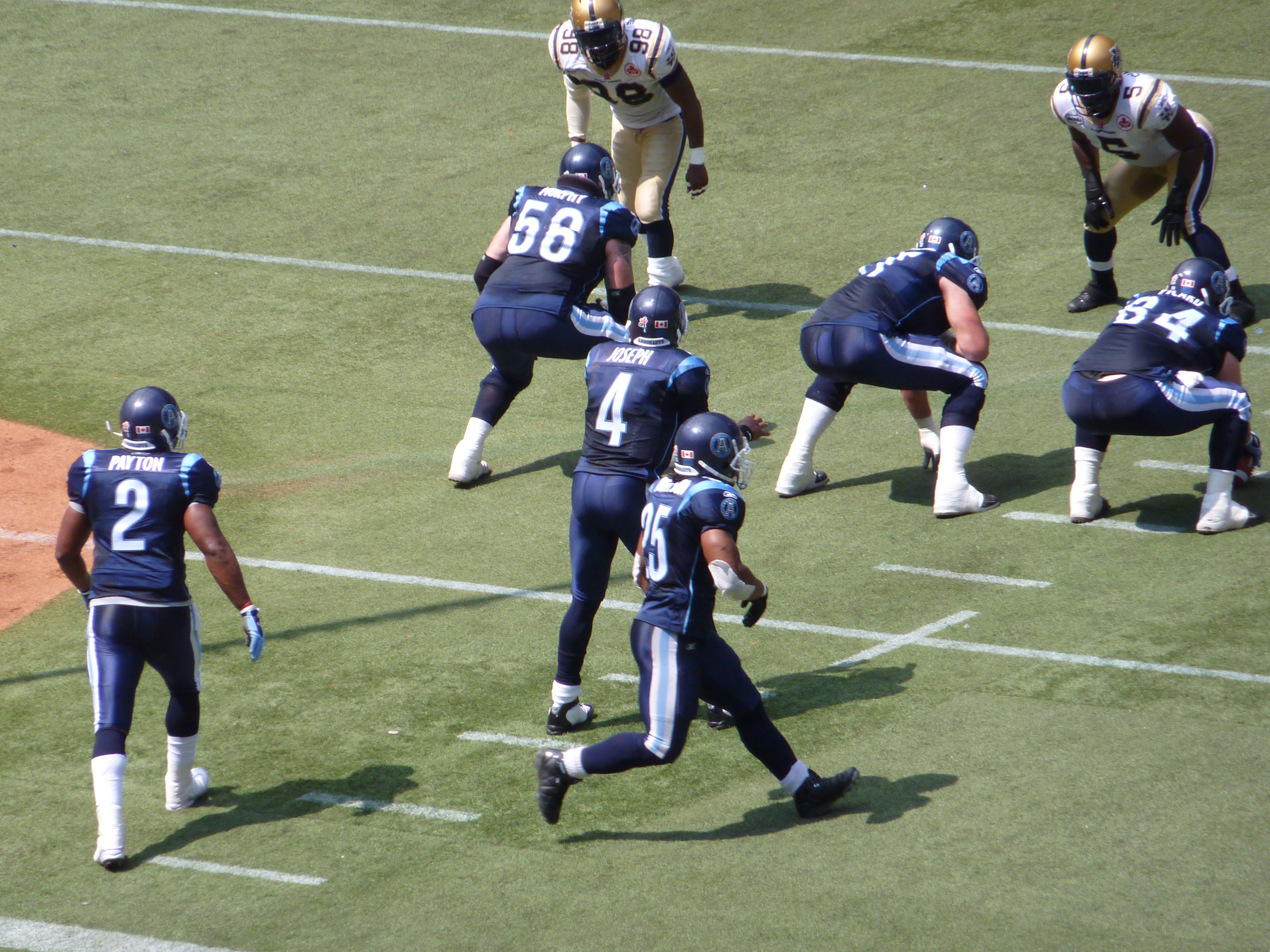
Robertson (#25) in the backfield in 2009.

On June 5, 2008, he was traded to the Toronto Argonauts in exchange for Leron Mitchell. The trade came after Argonaut starter Tyler Ebell ruptured his Achilles tendon, necessitating a move for Toronto. Robertson started seven out of 17 games played in 2008, with 548 yards and six touchdowns rushing, 258 yards and one touchdown receiving, and 333 yards on kickoff returns. In 2009, Robertson played in 18 games where he rushed for 1,031 yards and nine touchdowns, received for 482 yards and 37 yards, and had 191 kickoff return yards.

On March 22, 2010, Robertson signed with the BC Lions. Starting all 16 games played, Robertson had 953 yards and eight touchdowns on rushing plays and 387 yards and a touchdown as a receiver.

He re-signed with the BC Lions on January 24, 2011. In a season where the Lions won the 99th Grey Cup, Robertson had seven starts in nine games and had 296 rushing yards with three touchdowns, 170 receiving yards with one touchdown, and 69 kickoff return yards. On December 1, 2011, Robertson retired from football.
