= Milton A. Lee =

US Army soldier (1949–1968)

Milton Arthur Lee
- Army Medal of Honor
- Born: February 28, 1949; Shreveport, Louisiana, US
- Died: April 26, 1968 (aged 19) near Phu Bai, Thừa Thiên Province, Republic of Vietnam
- Burial place: Fort Sam Houston National Cemetery, San Antonio, Texas
- Military career
- Allegiance: United States
- Branch: United States Army
- Service years: 1967–1968
- Rank: Private First Class
- Units: 502nd Infantry Regiment, 1st Brigade, 101st Airborne Division (Airmobile)
- Conflicts: Vietnam War †
- Awards: Medal of Honor

Milton Arthur Lee (February 28, 1949 – April 26, 1968) was a United States Army soldier and a posthumous recipient of the United States military's highest decoration—the Medal of Honor—for his actions in the Vietnam War.

== Biography ==
A native of Shreveport, Louisiana, Lee graduated from Harlandale High School and joined the Army in 1967 in San Antonio, Texas. By April 26, 1968, was serving as a private first class in Company B, 2nd Battalion, 502nd Infantry Regiment, 1st Brigade, 101st Airborne Division (Airmobile). During a firefight on that day, near Phu Bai in Thừa Thiên Province, Republic of Vietnam, Lee single-handedly destroyed an enemy emplacement and was mortally wounded while attacking a second.

Lee, aged 19 at his death, was buried in Fort Sam Houston National Cemetery in San Antonio.

Lee Gymnasium at Fort Campbell, Kentucky, is named in His honor.

== Medal of Honor citation ==
Private Lee's official Medal of Honor citation reads:

For conspicuous gallantry and intrepidity in action at the risk of his life above and beyond the call of duty. Pfc. Lee distinguished himself near the city of Phu Bai in the province of Thua Thien. Pfc. Lee was serving as the radio telephone operator with the 3d platoon, Company B. As lead element for the company, the 3d platoon received intense surprise hostile fire from a force of North Vietnamese Army regulars in well-concealed bunkers. With 50 percent casualties, the platoon maneuvered to a position of cover to treat their wounded and reorganize, while Pfc. Lee moved through the heavy enemy fire giving lifesaving first aid to his wounded comrades. During the subsequent assault on the enemy defensive positions, Pfc. Lee continuously kept close radio contact with the company commander, relaying precise and understandable orders to his platoon leader. While advancing with the front rank toward the objective, Pfc. Lee observed 4 North Vietnamese soldiers with automatic weapons and a rocket launcher lying in wait for the lead element of the platoon. As the element moved forward, unaware of the concealed danger, Pfc. Lee immediately and with utter disregard for his own personal safety, passed his radio to another soldier and charged through the murderous fire. Without hesitation he continued his assault, overrunning the enemy position, killing all occupants and capturing 4 automatic weapons and a rocket launcher. Pfc. Lee continued his 1-man assault on the second position through a heavy barrage of enemy automatic weapons fire. Grievously wounded, he continued to press the attack, crawling forward into a firing position and delivering accurate covering fire to enable his platoon to maneuver and destroy the position. Not until the position was overrun did Pfc. Lee falter in his steady volume of fire and succumb to his wounds. Pfc. Lee's heroic actions saved the lives of the lead element and were instrumental in the destruction of the key position of the enemy defense. Pfc. Lee's gallantry at the risk of life above and beyond the call of duty are in keeping with the highest traditions of the military service and reflect great credit on himself, the 502d Infantry, and the U.S. Army.

== See also ==
- List of Medal of Honor recipients
- List of Medal of Honor recipients for the Vietnam War
