= Patrick Huckle =

German footballer

Personal information
- Date of birth: November 4, 1983 (age 43)
- Place of birth: Karlsruhe, Germany
- Height: 1.71 m (5 ft 7 in)
- Position: Left-back

Youth career
- –2002: Karlsruher SC

Senior career*
Years	Team	Apps	(Gls)
2002–2003	FC Nöttingen	2	(0)
2003–2004	FC Rastatt 04		
2004–2005	SV Weingarten	32	(1)
2005–2006	SV Elversberg	20	(0)
2006–2009	SSV Ulm	97	(3)
2009–2010	Kickers Offenbach II	9	(0)
2010	Waldhof Mannheim	13	(0)
2010–2012	Preußen Münster	58	(0)
2012–2014	Waldhof Mannheim	61	(1)
2014–2017	Rot-Weiss Essen	73	(0)
2017–2019	FSV Frankfurt	67	(1)
2019–2020	CfR Pforzheim	11	(0)
Total		443	(6)
- * Club domestic league appearances and goals

Patrick Huckle (born November 4, 1983) is a German former footballer who played as a left-back.
