= Wilbur Huckle =

American baseball player (born 1941)

- Infielder / Manager
- Born: November 25, 1941 (age 84)^{note} San Antonio, Texas
- Bats: Right Throws: Right
- Stats at Baseball Reference

Wilbur Allan Huckle (born November 25, 1941) (Note: Huckle's birth date and location—November 25, 1941, in San Antonio, Texas—are as listed on a digitized "player contact card" originally created by The Sporting News. Baseball-Reference.com lists Huckle's date of birth as December 23, 1937. However, a 1937 year of birth is contradicted by contemporary newspaper reports, as Huckle was listed on a baseball roster as being 20 years old in September 1961, and was referred to as a "22-year-old shortstop" in January 1964; these align with a 1941 year of birth. Additionally, he was playing high school sports as late as the spring of 1960, which also aligns with a 1941 year of birth.) is a former professional baseball infielder in the New York Mets farm system, who achieved "fan favorite" status, despite never playing in Major League Baseball. Listed at 5 feet 10 inches (1.78 m) and 175 pounds (79 kg), Huckle threw and batted right-handed. He later was a manager in the Mets farm system.

== Playing career ==
Huckle was a three-sport athlete at Harlandale High School in San Antonio, Texas, competing in football, baseball, and basketball. He played college baseball at Sul Ross State College in Alpine, Texas, in 1961—when he hit .396 (23-for-58)—and 1962.

Huckle played in the Mets' minor league system from 1963 to 1971. He reached the Triple-A level in 1966, playing 67 games with the Jacksonville Suns. He played 76 games with Jacksonville in 1967, and 64 games with the Triple-A Tidewater Tides in 1969. In three seasons in Triple-A, Huckle had a .263 batting average with one home run and 58 RBIs. He also played six seasons at the Double-A level and two seasons in Class A. Overall, Huckle played in 746 minor league games; defensively, he played 491 games at shortstop, 100 games at second base, 95 games at third base, and 3 games in the outfield (other appearances were as a pinch hitter), accruing a .944 fielding average.

According to journalist Keith Olbermann, a photographer recalls that Huckle received a September call-up to the Mets in 1963, on the same day as Cleon Jones, but was optioned back to the minor leagues without appearing in a game. This recollection was challenged by researchers contributing to the "Mets by the Numbers" website, who contend that Huckle indeed was invited to work out with the Mets in September 1963, but was not actually added to the major league roster. Consistent with the latter account, Red Foley of the New York Daily News had written in mid-September 1963 that Jones and Huckle were working out with the Mets, but that neither player was on the Mets' roster.

Career minor league statistics
| G | PA | AB | R | H | 2B | 3B | HR | RBI | SB | CS | BB | SO | BA | OBP | SLG | OPS | TB |
|---|---|---|---|---|---|---|---|---|---|---|---|---|---|---|---|---|---|
| 746 | 2849 | 2554 | 308 | 662 | 85 | 19 | 14 | 224 | 49 | 20 | 251 | 215 | .259 | .327 | .324 | .651 | 827 |

=== Fan favorite ===
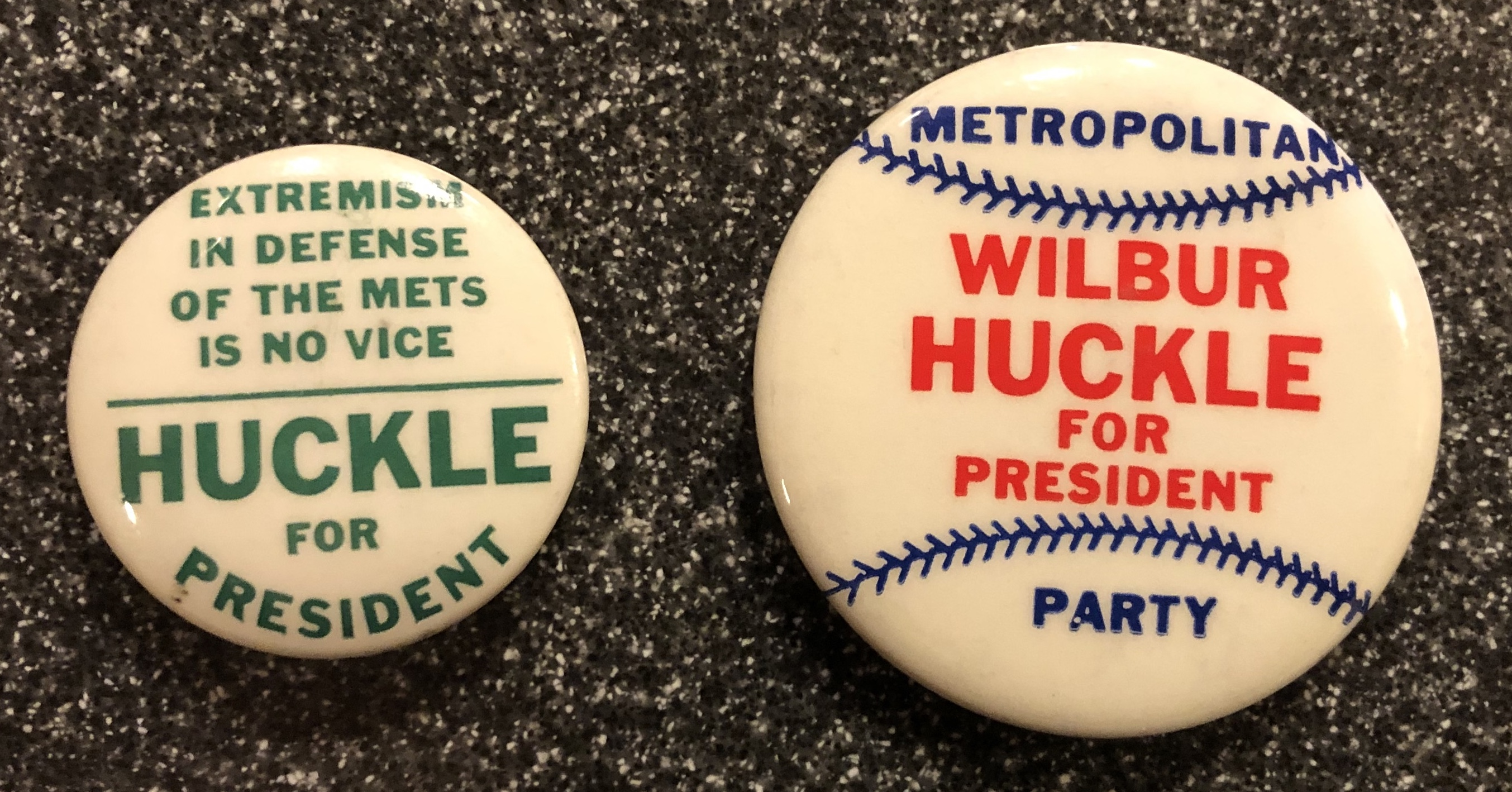
"Wilbur Huckle for President" campaign buttons

Huckle's reputation was presumably developed from spring training dispatches and broadcasts, augmented by the uniqueness of his name. In August 1964, during the Mets' first season at Shea Stadium, one of the winning entries in the team's annual banner contest, which drew over 1000 entrants, was "The Metropolitan Party Nominates Wilbur Huckle for President". At the time, Huckle was in his second professional season, playing for the Double-A Williamsport Mets in Pennsylvania. "Wilbur Huckle for President" campaign buttons from the era can occasionally be found on online auction sites.

As far as appearance and position, one blogger remembers Huckle this way: "Wilbur was a Mets farmhand in the '60's, a shortstop who also played some third base. There was really nothing special about him except for his name and the fact that he looked exactly the way you might expect someone named Wilbur Huckle to look, with red hair and a million freckles."

=== Huckle as a roommate ===
In 1966, Wilbur became the first professional baseball roommate of future Hall of Fame inductee Tom Seaver, during Seaver's first minor league season in Jacksonville, Florida. Seaver recalled:

"My first year in professional baseball, I roomed with a fellow named Wilbur Huckle, who played the infield for Jacksonville. We had a rather unusual relationship. I never saw Wilbur Huckle in our room — at least not awake.

I never talked with him. I never heard him. I never ate a meal with him. When I came in at night, early or late, he was either out or asleep. And when I got up in the morning, he was always gone. He got up early and went on long walks by himself."

Huckle's prowess as a roommate is matched only by his reputation as a teammate:

"Lots of guys tried, but nobody ever beat Wilbur Huckle getting into street clothes after a game... . Once, I heard, when Wilbur was playing in a lower minor league, his team was on a losing streak, and when they lost their sixth or seventh in a row, the manager started screaming at his players as they entered the clubhouse. "Sit down on the benches", he hollered. "This has gone too damn far. Just sit down and think about your mistakes. Think about your errors. Nobody's taking a shower until I say so." The manager was facing the whole team, scowling and storming, and right behind him stood Wilbur Huckle, fresh out of the shower, toweling himself dry."

== Post-playing career ==
Managerial career
| Year | Team | League | W | L | Pct. | Finish | Ref. |
|---|---|---|---|---|---|---|---|
| 1972 | Batavia Trojans | NY–Penn | 29 | 40 | .420 | 6th | |
| 1973 | Batavia Trojans | NY–Penn | 33 | 36 | .478 | 5th | |
| 1974 | Batavia Trojans | NY–Penn | 20 | 49 | .290 | 6th | |
| Totals | 3 Seasons | | 82 | 125 | .396 | | |

After his playing career ended, Huckle managed the Class A Short-Season Batavia Trojans of the New York–Penn League for three seasons during their period as a Mets affiliate, but his teams accrued only a .396 winning percentage. Huckle was reportedly fired by the Mets' director of scouting, Nelson Burbrink, when Huckle submitted a list of players on the squad, who he felt were legitimate major league prospects, that only had a single name on it. Burbrink felt that Huckle couldn't evaluate talent; however, the player that Huckle had named was catcher Ned Yost, who went on to play six seasons in the major leagues. Of the players on Batavia's roster in 1974, only Yost and pitcher Bob Myrick eventually played in MLB.
