= Harlandale High School =

Location
- 114 East Gerald Avenue; San Antonio, Bexar County, Texas 78214; United States; 29°21′54″N 98°30′7″W

Information
- School type: Public, high school
- Motto: Once an Indian, Always an Indian, Indian Pride
- Established: 1953
- Locale: City: Large
- School district: Harlandale ISD
- NCES School ID: 482247002260
- Principal: Andrew Martinez
- Staff: 115.03 (on an FTE basis)
- Grades: 9–12
- Enrollment: 1,611 (2023–2024)
- Student to teacher ratio: 14.01
- Colors: Maroon & Gold
- Athletics conference: UIL Class 5A
- Mascot: Indian/Lady Indian
- Website: Harlandale High School

Harlandale High School is a public high school located in the city of San Antonio, Texas and classified as a 5A school by the University Interscholastic League. This school is part of the Harlandale Independent School District located in south central Bexar County. During 2022–2023, Harlandale High School had an enrollment of 1,664 students and a student to teacher ratio of 13.76. The school received an overall rating of "D" from the Texas Education Agency for the 2024–2025 school year.

== Notable alumni ==
- Jesse Borrego (class of 1980) – actor
- David Cruz (Journalist) – TV News Anchor and League of United Latin American Citizens Spokesperson
- Wilbur Huckle (class of 1960) – baseball player and manager
- Milton A. Lee (class of 1967) – soldier
- Jesse James Leija† (class of 1984) – boxer
- Leo Pacheco (class of 1976) – politician
- Ciro Rodriguez – politician
- Tobin Rote (class of 1946) – football player
- Frank Tejeda – politician
- Fadli Zon – Indonesian politician
