= 2002 NFL Europe season =

European-American football season

The 2002 NFL Europe season was the tenth season in 12 years of the American football league that started out as the World League of American Football. The Barcelona Dragons changed their names to FC Barcelona Dragons.

NFL Europe League
Team	W	L	T	PCT	PF	PA	Home	Road	STK
Rhein Fire	7	3	0	.700	166	156	4–1	3–2	L1
Berlin Thunder	6	4	0	.600	231	188	3–2	3–2	W3
Frankfurt Galaxy	6	4	0	.600	189	174	3–2	3–2	L2
Scottish Claymores	5	5	0	.500	197	172	3–2	2–3	W1
Amsterdam Admirals	4	6	0	.400	218	202	2–3	2–3	W2
FC Barcelona Dragons	2	8	0	.200	202	311	1–4	1–4	L3

== World Bowl X ==
Berlin 26-20 Rhein Saturday, June 22, 2002 Rheinstadion Düsseldorf, Germany.
