= Rheinstadion =

Former stadium in Düsseldorf, Germany

Coordinates: 51°15′37″N 6°44′03″E

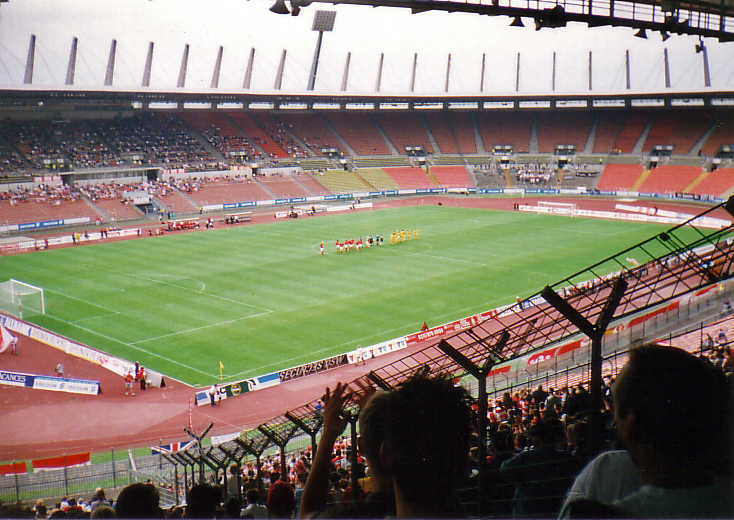
- Interactive map of Rheinstadion
- Location: Düsseldorf, Germany
- Capacity: 54,000
- Surface: Grass

Construction
- Opened: September 1925
- Renovated: 1974
- Closed: 22 June 2002
- Demolished: 6 November 2002
- Architects: Heinrich Freese (1925); Friedrich Tamms and Erwin Beyer (1974)

Tenants
- Fortuna Düsseldorf (1974–2002); Rhein Fire (1995–2002)

The Rheinstadion (German pronunciation: [ˈʁaɪnˌʃtaːdi̯ɔn]) was a multi-purpose stadium, in Düsseldorf, Germany. The stadium was built, near the Rhine, in 1926 and held 54,000 people at the end of its life.

It was the home ground for Fortuna Düsseldorf from 1953 to 1970 and 1972–2002. It was used during the 1974 FIFA World Cup and 1988 European Championships. In 1995, the Rhein Fire, of the World League of American Football became tenants in their inaugural season. It hosted World Bowl '99 and World Bowl X.

Metallica performed at the stadium during their Nowhere Else to Roam Tour on 20 May 1993, with The Cult & Suicidal Tendencies as their opening act.

It was demolished in the summer of 2002, after the World Bowl X championship game, and has been replaced by the Merkur Spiel-Arena in 2004.

== International matches ==
=== 1974 FIFA World Cup ===
Date	Time (CET)	Team #1	Result	Team #2	Round	Attendance
15 June 1974	16:00	Sweden	0–0	Bulgaria	Group 3	23,800
23 June 1974	16:00	Sweden	3–0	Uruguay	Group 3	28,300
26 June 1974	16:00	Yugoslavia	0–2	West Germany	Group B	67,385
30 June 1974	19:30	West Germany	4–2	Sweden	Group B	67,800
3 July 1974	19:30	Sweden	2–1	Yugoslavia	Group B	41,300

=== UEFA Euro 1988 ===
Date	Time (CEST)	Team #1	Result	Team #2	Round	Attendance
10 June 1988	20:15	West Germany	1–1	Italy	Group 1 (opening match)	62,552
15 June 1988	17:15	England	1–3	Netherlands	Group 2	63,940

Preceded by Heysel Stadium; Brussels	European Cup Winners' Cup; Final venue 1981	Succeeded by Camp Nou; Barcelona
