= World Bowl X =

2002 NFL Europe championship game

Berlin Thunder (2nd)	Rhein Fire (1st)
26	20
	1	2	3	4	Total
BER	13	7	3	3	26
RHE	0	0	7	13	20
- Date: Saturday, June 22, 2002
- Stadium: Rheinstadion; Düsseldorf, Germany
- MVP: Dane Looker, Wide receiver
- Referee: Walt Anderson
- Attendance: 53,109

Ceremonies
- Halftime show: Faithless

TV in the United States
- Network: Fox
- Announcers: Curt Menefee and Brian Baldinger

World Bowl X was the 2002 championship game of the NFL Europe League. The game was played at Rheinstadion in Düsseldorf, Germany on Saturday, June 22, 2002. It would be the final event held at Rheinstadion before its demolition.

In this game, the defending champion Berlin Thunder were hoping to protect their title after going through another 6–4 season. This time, their opponent was the 7–3 Rhein Fire, who won the World Bowl in 2000 and were hoping to take home another title. There were 53,109 fans in attendance (the largest World Bowl crowd since 1991, and second-highest ever), who witnessed NFL Europe history. The Berlin Thunder became the first NFL Europe team to win back-to-back World Bowls, thanks to their 26–20 victory over the Fire. Thunder WR Dane Looker was given MVP honors, after having 11 receptions for 111 yards and 2 Touchdowns, with his longest reception being 41 Yards.

== Background ==
The Fire swept the regular season series against the Thunder (20–16 in Berlin & 24–14 in Düsseldorf).

== Game summary ==
Rhein's opening drive came to an abrupt end on the just the second play from scrimmage, as Thunder DE Dwayne Missouri intercepted Fire QB Tee Martin's pass, setting up a 47-yard field goal by Danny Boyd. On their next drive, Thunder QB Todd Husak led an 8-play, 85-yard drive that was capped off with a 41-yard pass to WR Dane Looker. On their next possession (which would be the last one of the quarter), the Thunder failed on three passes to turn an interception into a touchdown. So, they had to settle for a 27-yard field goal. In the second quarter, Berlin's defense prevented the Rhein Fire from getting some needed heat and the Thunder offense managed to get a touchdown near the end of the half, thanks to a 15-yard pass from Husak to Looker. With that touchdown, Berlin entered halftime with a commanding 20–0 lead. In the third quarter, the Fire finally managed to score, thanks to RB Tony Taylor getting an 8-yard TD run. However, the Thunder responded with Boyd's 45-yard field goal. Trailing 23–7 entering the fourth quarter, the Rhein Fire needed points and they needed them fast. The Fire's next touchdown would come from a 2-yard pass from Tee Martin to Scott Cloman. Unfortunately, the two-point conversion pass to Oyeniran Odunayo Ojo failed. To make it even worse, the Thunder responded with a 38-yard field goal by Boyd. Near the end of the game, Fire QB Tee Martin ran in a 1-yard TD. However, by that point of the game, that touchdown meant nothing, since they failed to overcome a huge deficit. When the official clock reached 00:00, the Thunder celebrated their second championship, which was also their first back-to-back championship title.

=== Scoring summary ===
- Berlin - FG Boyd 47 yd 3:28 1st
- Berlin - TD Looker 41 yd pass from Husak 9:59 1st
- Berlin - FG Kruse 27 yd 14:01 1st
- Berlin - TD Looker 15 yd pass from Husak 13:04 2nd
- Rhein - TD Taylor 6 yd run 10:21 3rd
- Berlin - FG Boyd 45 yd 14:34 3rd
- Rhein - TD Cloman 2 yd pass from Martin (Two-Point Failed)
- Berlin - FG Boyd 38 yd pass 7:00 4th
- Rhein - TD Martin 1 yd run 14:40 4th
