= 1996 Kansas City Chiefs season =

NFL team season

- Owner: Lamar Hunt
- General manager: Carl Peterson
- Head coach: Marty Schottenheimer
- Offensive coordinator: Paul Hackett
- Defensive coordinator: Gunther Cunningham
- Home stadium: Arrowhead Stadium

Results
- Record: 9–7
- Division place: 2nd AFC West
- Playoffs: Did not qualify
- All-Pros: 2: LB Derrick Thomas (2nd team); CB Dale Carter (2nd team)
- Pro Bowlers: 4: FB Kimble Anders; G Will Shields; LB Derrick Thomas; CB Dale Carter

The 1996 season was the Kansas City Chiefs' 27th in the National Football League (NFL) and their 37th overall. Following their loss to the Colts in the playoffs the year before, the Chiefs failed to improve their 13–3 record from 1995 and finishing 9–7 record and second-place finish in the AFC West. Despite being predicted as one of the eventual winners of Super Bowl XXXI by Sports Illustrated, the team missed the playoffs for the first time since 1989.

== Offseason ==
=== NFL draft ===
1996 Kansas City Chiefs draft
Round	Pick	Player	Position	College	Notes
1	28	Jerome Woods *	Defensive back	Memphis	
2	58	Reggie Tongue	Defensive back	Oregon State	
3	68	John Browning	Defensive tackle	West Virginia	
4	98	Donnie Edwards *	Linebacker	UCLA	
5	135	Joe Horn *	Wide receiver	Itawamba CC	
6	176	Dietrich Jells	Wide receiver	Pittsburgh	
7	211	Ben Lynch	Center	California	
7	241	Jeff Smith	Center	Tennessee	
7	245	Darrell Williams	Defensive back	Tennessee State	
Made roster * Made at least one Pro Bowl during career

== Personnel ==
=== Staff ===
1996 Kansas City Chiefs staff
Front office: Founder – Lamar Hunt; Chairman of the board – Jack Steadman; President/general manager/chief executive officer – Carl Peterson; Executive vice president/assistant general manager – Dennis Thum; Vice president of player personnel – Lynn Stiles; Director of pro personnel – Mark Hatley; Director of college scouting – Terry Bradway; Head coaches: Head coach – Marty Schottenheimer; Assistant head coach/wide receivers – Al Saunders; Offensive coaches: Offensive coordinator – Paul Hackett; Quarterbacks – Mike McCarthy; Running backs – Jimmy Raye; Tight ends/offensive assistant – Jim Erkenbeck; Offensive line – Art Shell	Defensive coaches: Defensive coordinator – Gunther Cunningham; Defensive line – Carl Hairston; Linebackers – John Bunting; Defensive backs – Kurt Schottenheimer; Defensive assistant/special teams – Woodrow Lowe; Defensive assistant/quality control – Darvin Wallis; Special teams coaches: Special teams – Mike Stock; Strength and conditioning: Strength and conditioning – Dave Redding; Assistant strength and conditioning – Russ Ball

=== Roster ===
1996 Kansas City Chiefs roster
Quarterbacks (QB): 13 Steve Bono; 12 Rich Gannon; 15 Steve Matthews; Running backs (RB): 32 Marcus Allen; 38 Kimble Anders; 30 Donnell Bennett; 29 Greg Hill; 48 Todd McNair; Wide receivers (WR): 84 Joe Horn; 83 Danan Hughes; 18 Sean LaChapelle; 81 Chris Penn PR; 87 Tamarick Vanover; Tight ends (TE): 89 Keith Cash; 85 Reggie Johnson; 82 Derrick Walker	Offensive linemen (OL): 76 John Alt T; 69 Jeff Criswell T; 61 Tim Grunhard C; 74 Trezelle Jenkins T; 68 Will Shields G; 66 Ricky Siglar T; 65 Jeff Smith C; 79 Dave Szott G; 72 Danny Villa; Defensive linemen (DL): 71 Tom Barndt DT; 99 Vaughn Booker DE; 93 John Browning DE; 77 Pellom McDaniels DE; 75 Joe Phillips DT; 97 Dan Saleaumua DT; 95 Tom Sims DT; 90 Neil Smith DE; 94 Keith Traylor NT	Linebackers (LB): 50 Anthony Davis OLB; 55 Troy Dumas OLB; 59 Donnie Edwards MLB; 58 Derrick Thomas OLB; 57 George Jamison OLB; 51 Greg Manusky OLB; 54 Tracy Simien MLB; Defensive backs (DB): 44 Darren Anderson CB; 21 Martin Bayless S; 34 Dale Carter CB; 25 Mark Collins FS; 40 James Hasty CB; 45 Tony Stargell CB; 41 Reggie Tongue SS; 29 Brian Washington SS; 35 William White FS; 31 Jerome Woods FS/KR; Special teams (ST): 5 Louie Aguiar P; 10 Pete Stoyanovich K	Practice squad: 62 David Barnard DT; 14 Terence Davis WR; 2 Michael Dritlein WR; 46 Luther Morris TE; 47 Mike Senters CB/WR; 4 Eric Smith WR (NF-Inj.); 53 active, 8 inactive, 5 practice squad Reserve: 88 Victor Bailey WR (IR); 80 Lake Dawson WR (IR); -- Kerry Hicks DE (NF-Ill.); 67 Bryan Proby DE (NF-Inj.); 49 Tony Richardson FB (IR); 52 Tracy Rogers LB (IR); 22 J.J. Smith RB (IR); Rookies in italics

== Preseason ==
Week	Date	Opponent	Result	Record	Venue	Attendance	Recap
1	August 4	vs. Dallas Cowboys	W 32–6	1–0	(Mexico) Estadio Universitario (Monterrey)	45,128	Recap
2	August 10	New Orleans Saints	W 42–6	2–0	Arrowhead Stadium	65,710	Recap
3	August 17	St. Louis Rams	L 30–34	2–1	Arrowhead Stadium	72,191	Recap
4	August 22	at Chicago Bears	W 14–10	3–1	Soldier Field	51,111	Recap

== Regular season ==
=== Schedule ===
Week	Date	Opponent	Result	Record	Venue	Attendance	Recap
1	September 1	at Houston Oilers	**W** 20–19	1–0	Houston Astrodome	27,725	Recap
2	September 8	**Oakland Raiders**	**W** 19–3	2–0	Arrowhead Stadium	79,281	Recap
3	September 15	at **Seattle Seahawks**	**W** 35–17	3–0	Kingdome	39,790	Recap
4	September 22	**Denver Broncos**	**W** 17–14	4–0	Arrowhead Stadium	79,439	Recap
5	September 29	at **San Diego Chargers**	**L** 19–22	4–1	Jack Murphy Stadium	59,384	Recap
6	October 7	Pittsburgh Steelers	**L** 7–17	4–2	Arrowhead Stadium	79,189	Recap
7	Bye						
8	October 17	**Seattle Seahawks**	**W** 34–16	5–2	Arrowhead Stadium	76,057	Recap
9	October 27	at **Denver Broncos**	**L** 7–34	5–3	Mile High Stadium	75,652	Recap
10	November 3	at Minnesota Vikings	**W** 21–6	6–3	Hubert H. Humphrey Metrodome	59,552	Recap
11	November 10	Green Bay Packers	**W** 27–20	7–3	Arrowhead Stadium	79,281	Recap
12	November 17	Chicago Bears	**W** 14–10	8–3	Arrowhead Stadium	76,762	Recap
13	November 24	**San Diego Chargers**	**L** 14–28	8–4	Arrowhead Stadium	69,472	Recap
14	November 28	at Detroit Lions	**W** 28–24	9–4	Pontiac Silverdome	75,079	Recap
15	December 9	at **Oakland Raiders**	**L** 7–26	9–5	Oakland–Alameda County Coliseum	57,082	Recap
16	December 15	Indianapolis Colts	**L** 19–24	9–6	Arrowhead Stadium	71,136	Recap
17	December 22	at Buffalo Bills	**L** 9–20	9–7	Rich Stadium	68,671	Recap
Note: Intra-division opponents are in **bold** text.

=== Game summaries ===
==== Week 1: at Houston Oilers ====
Week 1: Kansas City Chiefs at Houston Oilers – Game summary

Quarter	1	2	3	4	Total
**Chiefs**	7	10	0	3	**20**
Oilers	10	6	0	3	**19**

at Astrodome, Houston, Texas

- Date: September 1
- Game time: 12:00 p.m. CDT
- Game weather: None (indoor stadium)
- Game attendance: 27,725
- Referee: Dick Hantak
- TV announcers (NBC): Don Criqui and Beasley Reece
- Recap, Game Book

Game information

**First quarter**

- HOU – Al Del Greco 34-yard field goal, 10:21. Oilers 3–0. **Drive: 4 plays, −1 yard, 2:11.**
- HOU – Willie Davis 34-yard pass from Chris Chandler (Al Del Greco kick), 6:02. Oilers 10–0. **Drive: 6 plays, 53 yards, 2:31.**
- KC – Tamarick Vanover 11-yard pass from Steve Bono (Pete Stoyanovich kick), 4:33. Oilers 10–7. **Drive: 3 plays, 79 yards, 1:29.**

**Second quarter**

- KC – Pete Stoyanovich 35-yard field goal, 12:36. Tied 10–10. **Drive: 16 plays, 77 yards, 8:38.**
- HOU – Al Del Greco 44-yard field goal, 7:32. Oilers 13–10. **Drive: 8 plays, 48 yards, 5:04.**
- HOU – Al Del Greco 33-yard field goal, 0:13. Oilers 16–10. **Drive: 4 plays, 2 yards, 1:42.**
- KC – Lake Dawson 23-yard pass from Steve Bono (Pete Stoyanovich kick), 0:26. Chiefs 17–16. **Drive: 7 plays, 68 yards, 0:56.**

**Third quarter**

- No scoring plays.

**Fourth quarter**

- KC – Pete Stoyanovich 43-yard field goal, 11:27. Chiefs 20–16. **Drive: 9 plays, 43 yards, 4:41.**
- HOU – Al Del Greco 22-yard field goal, 3:37. Chiefs 20–19. **Drive: 13 plays, 72 yards, 7:50.**

**Top passers**

- KC – Steve Bono – 21/37, 192 yards, 2 TD
- HOU – Chris Chandler – 16/29, 216 yards, TD, INT

**Top rushers**

- KC – Kimble Anders – 5 rushes, 21 yards
- HOU – Eddie George – 21 rushes, 50 yards

**Top receivers**

- KC – Tamarick Vanover – 7 receptions, 76 yards, TD
- HOU – Chris Sanders – 2 receptions, 58 yards

==== Week 2: vs. Oakland Raiders ====
Week 2: Oakland Raiders at Kansas City Chiefs – Game summary

Quarter	1	2	3	4	Total
Raiders	0	0	0	3	**3**
**Chiefs**	0	7	7	5	**19**

at Arrowhead Stadium, Kansas City, Missouri

- Date: September 8
- Game time: 12:00 p.m. CDT
- Game weather: Overcast, 73 °F (23 °C)
- Game attendance: 79,281
- Referee: Jerry Markbreit
- TV announcers (NBC): Dick Enberg, Paul Maguire, Phil Simms and Jim Gray
- Recap, Game Book

Game information

**First quarter**

- No scoring plays.

**Second quarter**

- KC – Tony Richardson 1-yard pass from Steve Bono (Pete Stoyanovich kick), 1:09. Chiefs 7–0. **Drive: 10 plays, 72 yards, 4:22.**

**Third quarter**

- KC – James Hasty 80-yard interception return (Pete Stoyanovich kick), 8:39. Chiefs 14–0.

**Fourth quarter**

- KC – Pete Stoyanovich 23-yard field goal, 13:39. Chiefs 17–0. **Drive: 9 plays, 49 yards, 5:20.**
- OAK – Cole Ford 38-yard field goal, 7:01. Chiefs 17–3. **Drive: 13 plays, 61 yards, 6:38.**
- KC – Barret Robbins tackled in end zone by Dan Saleaumua for a Safety, 3:12. Chiefs 19–3.

**Top passers**

- OAK – Billy Joe Hobert – 19/40, 181 yards, INT
- KC – Steve Bono – 11/19, 135 yards, TD

**Top rushers**

- OAK – Napoleon Kaufman – 8 rushes, 69 yards
- KC – Greg Hill – 7 rushes, 50 yards

**Top receivers**

- OAK – Tim Brown – 8 receptions, 96 yards
- KC – Danan Hughes – 3 receptions, 45 yards

==== Week 3: at Seattle Seahawks ====
Week 3: Kansas City Chiefs at Seattle Seahawks – Game summary

Quarter	1	2	3	4	Total
**Chiefs**	14	7	7	7	**35**
Seahawks	0	10	0	7	**17**

at Kingdome, Seattle, Washington

- Date: September 15
- Game time: 3:00 p.m. CDT/1:00 p.m. PDT
- Game weather: None (indoor stadium)
- Game attendance: 39,790
- Referee: Mike Carey
- TV announcers (NBC): Don Criqui and Beasley Reece
- Recap, Game Book

Game information

**First quarter**

- KC – Chris Penn 9-yard pass from Steve Bono (Pete Stoyanovich kick), 10:07. Chiefs 7–0. **Drive: 7 plays, 57 yards, 2:48.**
- KC – Dale Carter 46-yard pass from Steve Bono (Pete Stoyanovich kick), 4:51. Chiefs 14–0. **Drive: 2 plays, 49 yards, 0:47.**

**Second quarter**

- SEA – Todd Peterson 47-yard field goal, 9:05. Chiefs 14–3. **Drive: 4 plays, 6 yards, 1:44.**
- SEA – Lamar Smith 4-yard run (Todd Peterson kick), 1:51. Chiefs 14–10. **Drive: 9 plays, 70 yards, 4:58.**
- KC – Chris Penn 1-yard pass from Steve Bono (Pete Stoyanovich kick), 0:24. Chiefs 21–10. **Drive: 8 plays, 81 yards, 1:27.**

**Third quarter**

- KC – Marcus Allen 2-yard run (Pete Stoyanovich kick), 9:44. Chiefs 28–10. **Drive: 9 plays, 76 yards, 5:16.**

**Fourth quarter**

- SEA – Rick Mirer 1-yard run (Todd Peterson kick), 13:28. Chiefs 28–17. **Drive: 12 plays, 80 yards, 6:17.**
- KC – Marcus Allen 1-yard run (Pete Stoyanovich kick), 3:19. Chiefs 35–17. **Drive: 6 plays, 80 yards, 3:14.**

**Top passers**

- KC – Steve Bono – 18/27, 185 yards, 3 TD
- SEA – Rick Mirer – 15/31, 159 yards, INT

**Top rushers**

- KC – Greg Hill – 11 rushes, 57 yards
- SEA – Lamar Smith – 8 rushes, 73 yards, TD

**Top receivers**

- KC – Dale Carter – 3 receptions, 61 yards, TD
- SEA – Joey Galloway – 4 receptions, 57 yards

==== Week 4: vs. Denver Broncos ====
Week 4: Denver Broncos at Kansas City Chiefs – Game summary

Quarter	1	2	3	4	Total
Broncos	7	7	0	0	**14**
**Chiefs**	3	7	0	7	**17**

at Arrowhead Stadium, Kansas City, Missouri

- Date: September 22
- Game time: 12:00 p.m. CDT
- Game weather: Sunny, 75 °F (24 °C)
- Game attendance: 79,439
- Referee: Red Cashion
- TV announcers (NBC): Dick Enberg, Paul Maguire, Phil Simms and Jim Gray
- Recap, Game Book

Game information

**First quarter**

- DEN – Terrell Davis 6-yard run (Jason Elam kick), 7:26. Broncos 7–0. **Drive: 14 plays, 74 yards, 7:34.**
- KC – Pete Stoyanovich 37-yard field goal, 0:57. Broncos 7–3. **Drive: 7 plays, 15 yards, 3:46.**

**Second quarter**

- KC – Danan Hughes 8-yard pass from Steve Bono (Pete Stoyanovich kick), 11:10. Chiefs 10–7. **Drive: 6 plays, 75 yards, 3:38.**
- DEN – Terrell Davis 65-yard run (Jason Elam kick), 6:34. Broncos 14–10. **Drive: 4 plays, 79 yards, 1:17.**

**Third quarter**

- No scoring plays.

**Fourth quarter**

- KC – Marcus Allen 2-yard run (Pete Stoyanovich kick), 4:09. Chiefs 17–14. **Drive: 8 plays, 67 yards, 4:07.**

**Top passers**

- DEN – John Elway – 14/30, 156 yards, 2 INT
- KC – Steve Bono – 20/35, 242 yards, TD, INT

**Top rushers**

- DEN – Terrell Davis – 19 rushes, 141 yards, 2 TD
- KC – Marcus Allen – 17 rushes, 55 yards, TD

**Top receivers**

- DEN – Shannon Sharpe – 9 receptions, 131 yards
- KC – Kimble Anders – 3 receptions, 68 yards

==== Week 5: at San Diego Chargers ====
Week 5: Kansas City Chiefs at San Diego Chargers – Game summary

Quarter	1	2	3	4	Total
Chiefs	0	9	7	3	**19**
**Chargers**	6	0	10	6	**22**

at Jack Murphy Stadium, San Diego, California

- Date: September 29
- Game time: 3:00 p.m. CDT/1:00 p.m. PDT
- Game weather: Fair, 70 °F (21 °C)
- Game attendance: 59,384
- Referee: Ed Hochuli
- TV announcers (NBC): Marv Albert and Sam Wyche
- Recap, Game Book

Game information

**First quarter**

- SD – John Carney 33-yard field goal, 7:44. Chargers 3–0. **Drive: 13 plays, 65 yards, 6:03.**
- SD – John Carney 38-yard field goal, 0:26. Chargers 6–0. **Drive: 7 plays, 32 yards, 2:23.**

**Second quarter**

- KC – Pete Stoyanovich 44-yard field goal, 12:17. Chargers 6–3. **Drive: 4 plays, 5 yards, 1:46.**
- KC – Pete Stoyanovich 26-yard field goal, 2:48. Tied 6–6. **Drive: 7 plays, 40 yards, 2:53.**
- KC – Pete Stoyanovich 25-yard field goal, 0:23. Chiefs 9–6. **Drive: 7 plays, 48 yards, 1:01.**

**Third quarter**

- SD – John Carney 44-yard field goal, 10:13. Tied 9–9. **Drive: 12 plays, 54 yards, 4:47.**
- SD – Darrien Gordon 81-yard punt return (John Carney kick), 7:14. Chargers 16–9.
- KC – Reggie Johnson 3-yard pass from Steve Bono (Pete Stoyanovich kick), 6:07. Tied 16–16. **Drive: 2 plays, 62 yards, 1:07.**

**Fourth quarter**

- SD – John Carney 39-yard field goal, 12:06. Chargers 19–16. **Drive: 9 plays, 61 yards, 3:17.**
- KC – Pete Stoyanovich 32-yard field goal, 9:50. Tied 19–19. **Drive: 6 plays, 14 yards, 2:16.**
- SD – John Carney 33-yard field goal, 3:17. Chargers 22–19. **Drive: 7 plays, 21 yards, 2:33.**

**Top passers**

- KC – Steve Bono – 25/54, 280 yards, TD, 2 INT
- SD – Stan Humphries – 19/41, 238 yards

**Top rushers**

- KC – Marcus Allen – 9 rushes, 35 yards
- SD – Leonard Russell – 14 rushes, 50 yards

**Top receivers**

- KC – Marcus Allen – 6 receptions, 88 yards
- SD – Alfred Pupunu – 5 receptions, 83 yards

==== Week 6: vs. Pittsburgh Steelers ====
Week 6: Pittsburgh Steelers at Kansas City Chiefs – Game summary

Quarter	1	2	3	4	Total
**Steelers**	0	6	8	3	**17**
Chiefs	0	7	0	0	**7**

at Arrowhead Stadium, Kansas City, Missouri

- Date: October 7
- Game time: 8:00 p.m. CDT
- Game weather: Overcast, 55 °F (13 °C)
- Game attendance: 79,189
- Referee: Howard Roe
- TV announcers (ABC): Al Michaels, Frank Gifford, Dan Dierdorf and Lynn Swann
- Recap, Game Book

Game information

**First quarter**

- No scoring plays.

**Second quarter**

- KC – Marcus Allen 6-yard run (Pete Stoyanovich kick), 7:38. Chiefs 7–0. **Drive: 14 plays, 80 yards, 7:41.**
- PIT – Norm Johnson 21-yard field goal, 4:48. Chiefs 7–3. **Drive: 8 plays, 56 yards, 2:50.**
- PIT – Norm Johnson 32-yard field goal, 0:31. Chiefs 7–6. **Drive: 11 plays, 68 yards, 2:24.**

**Third quarter**

- PIT – Jerome Bettis 5-yard run (Mike Tomczak–Mark Bruener pass), 2:41. Steelers 14–7. **Drive: 7 plays, 86 yards, 4:14.**

**Fourth quarter**

- PIT – Norm Johnson 43-yard field goal, 1:10. Steelers 17–7. **Drive: 7 plays, 17 yards, 2:28.**

**Top passers**

- PIT – Mike Tomczak – 20/32, 338 yards, INT
- KC – Steve Bono – 18/29, 170 yards, 2 INT

**Top rushers**

- PIT – Jerome Bettis – 27 rushes, 103 yards, TD
- KC – Marcus Allen – 18 rushes, 69 yards, TD

**Top receivers**

- PIT – Charles Johnson – 6 receptions, 125 yards
- KC – Chris Penn – 7 receptions, 80 yards

==== Week 8: vs. Seattle Seahawks ====
Week 8: Seattle Seahawks at Kansas City Chiefs – Game summary

Quarter	1	2	3	4	Total
Seahawks	0	3	7	6	**16**
**Chiefs**	10	10	7	7	**34**

at Arrowhead Stadium, Kansas City, Missouri

- Date: October 17
- Game time: 7:00 p.m. CDT
- Game weather: Partly cloudy, 49 °F (9 °C)
- Game attendance: 76,057
- Referee: Bernie Kukar
- TV announcers (TNT): Verne Lundquist, Pat Haden and Ernie Johnson
- Recap, Game Book

Game information

**First quarter**

- KC – Pete Stoyanovich 45-yard field goal, 10:28. Chiefs 3–0. **Drive: 9 plays, 51 yards, 4:32.**
- KC – Kimble Anders 15-yard run (Pete Stoyanovich kick), 3:41. Chiefs 10–0. **Drive: 7 plays, 74 yards, 3:28.**

**Second quarter**

- KC – Marcus Allen 1-yard run (Pete Stoyanovich kick), 3:47. Chiefs 17–0. **Drive: 13 plays, 81 yards, 8:00.**
- SEA – Todd Peterson 19-yard field goal, 0:26. Chiefs 17–3. **Drive: 14 plays, 66 yards, 3:21.**
- KC – Pete Stoyanovich 43-yard field goal, 0:00. Chiefs 20–3. **Drive: 3 plays, 42 yards, 0:26.**

**Third quarter**

- SEA – Chris Warren 50-yard run (Todd Peterson kick), 11:06. Chiefs 20–10. **Drive: 3 plays, 59 yards, 1:35.**
- KC – Marcus Allen 1-yard run (Pete Stoyanovich kick), 0:21. Chiefs 27–10. **Drive: 11 plays, 65 yards, 6:08.**

**Fourth quarter**

- KC – Sean LaChapelle 4-yard pass from Steve Bono (Pete Stoyanovich kick), 6:40. Chiefs 34–10. **Drive: 10 plays, 65 yards, 4:57.**
- SEA – Joey Galloway 16-yard pass from John Friesz (run failed), 1:01. Chiefs 34–16. **Drive: 6 plays, 69 yards, 1:52.**

**Top passers**

- SEA – John Friesz – 20/34, 238 yards, TD, INT
- KC – Steve Bono – 17/26, 194 yards, TD

**Top rushers**

- SEA – Chris Warren – 14 rushes, 81 yards, TD
- KC – Marcus Allen – 14 rushes, 39 yards, 2 TD

**Top receivers**

- SEA – Joey Galloway – 3 receptions, 65 yards, TD
- KC – Chris Penn – 5 receptions, 69 yards

==== Week 9: at Denver Broncos ====
Week 9: Kansas City Chiefs at Denver Broncos – Game summary

Quarter	1	2	3	4	Total
Chiefs	7	0	0	0	**7**
**Broncos**	17	7	7	3	**34**

at Mile High Stadium, Denver, Colorado

- Date: October 27
- Game time: 3:00 p.m. CST/2:00 p.m. MST
- Game weather: Partly cloudy, 44 °F (7 °C)
- Game attendance: 75,652
- Referee: Jerry Markbreit
- TV announcers (NBC): Marv Albert and Sam Wyche
- Recap, Game Book

Game information

**First quarter**

- DEN – Shannon Sharpe 46-yard pass from John Elway (Jason Elam kick), 9:36. Broncos 7–0. **Drive: 2 plays, 55 yards, 0:56.**
- DEN – Jason Elam 40-yard field goal, 5:57. Broncos 10–0. **Drive: 6 plays, 12 yards, 2:21.**
- KC – Tamarick Vanover 97-yard kickoff return (Pete Stoyanovich kick), 5:38. Broncos 10–7.
- DEN – Shannon Sharpe 10-yard pass from John Elway (Jason Elam kick), 2:49. Broncos 17–7. **Drive: 7 plays, 70 yards, 2:49.**

**Second quarter**

- DEN – Mike Sherrard 25-yard pass from John Elway (Jason Elam kick), 0:46. Broncos 24–7. **Drive: 8 plays, 59 yards, 1:51.**

**Third quarter**

- DEN – Aaron Craver 1-yard run (Jason Elam kick), 2:09. Broncos 31–7. **Drive: 4 plays, 56 yards, 1:38.**

**Fourth quarter**

- DEN – Jason Elam 29-yard field goal, 9:58. Broncos 34–7. **Drive: 11 plays, 61 yards, 6:22.**

**Top passers**

- KC – Steve Bono – 21/49, 213 yards, 2 INT
- DEN – John Elway – 16/31, 286 yards, 3 TD, INT

**Top rushers**

- KC – Marcus Allen – 7 rushes, 22 yards
- DEN – Terrell Davis – 21 rushes, 77 yards

**Top receivers**

- KC – Chris Penn – 3 receptions, 52 yards
- DEN – Shannon Sharpe – 6 receptions, 99 yards, 2 TD

==== Week 10: at Minnesota Vikings ====
Week 10: Kansas City Chiefs at Minnesota Vikings – Game summary

Quarter	1	2	3	4	Total
**Chiefs**	0	7	0	14	**21**
Vikings	0	0	0	6	**6**

at Hubert H. Humphrey Metrodome, Minneapolis, Minnesota

- Date: November 3
- Game time: 3:00 p.m. CST
- Game weather: None (indoor stadium)
- Game attendance: 59,552
- Referee: Ron Blum
- TV announcers (NBC): Charlie Jones and Randy Cross
- Recap, Game Book

Game information

**First quarter**

- No scoring plays.

**Second quarter**

- KC – Marcus Allen 1-yard run (Pete Stoyanovich kick), 0:26. Chiefs 7–0. **Drive: 12 plays, 83 yards, 4:26.**

**Third quarter**

- No scoring plays.

**Fourth quarter**

- KC – Greg Hill 17-yard run (Pete Stoyanovich kick), 3:32. Chiefs 14–0. **Drive: 6 plays, 41 yards, 2:53.**
- KC – Greg Hill 10-yard run (Pete Stoyanovich kick), 3:07. Chiefs 21–0. **Drive: 1 play, 10 yards, 0:05.**
- MIN – Cris Carter 1-yard pass from Brad Johnson (pass failed), 1:28. Chiefs 21–6. **Drive: 8 plays, 56 yards, 1:39.**

**Top passers**

- KC – Steve Bono – 19/32, 165 yards, INT
- MIN – Brad Johnson – 22/42, 218 yards, TD, 2 INT

**Top rushers**

- KC – Greg Hill – 15 rushes, 100 yards, 2 TD
- MIN – Amp Lee – 5 rushes, 22 yards

**Top receivers**

- KC – Kimble Anders – 7 receptions, 48 yards
- MIN – Cris Carter – 9 receptions, 89 yards, TD

==== Week 11: vs. Green Bay Packers ====
Week 11: Green Bay Packers at Kansas City Chiefs – Game summary

Quarter	1	2	3	4	Total
Packers	3	3	7	7	**20**
**Chiefs**	3	17	7	0	**27**

at Arrowhead Stadium, Kansas City, Missouri

- Date: November 10
- Game time: 12:00 p.m. CST
- Game weather: Cold, 30 °F (−1 °C)
- Game attendance: 79,281
- Referee: Bob McElwee
- TV announcers (Fox): Dick Stockton and Matt Millen
- Recap, Game Book

Game information

**First quarter**

- KC – Pete Stoyanovich 26-yard field goal, 12:59. Chiefs 3–0. **Drive: 5 plays, 70 yards, 2:01.**
- GB – Chris Jacke 24-yard field goal, 6:52. Tied 3–3. **Drive: 12 plays, 50 yards, 6:07.**

**Second quarter**

- KC – Pete Stoyanovich 22-yard field goal, 14:04. Chiefs 6–3. **Drive: 9 plays, 75 yards, 3:29.**
- KC – Greg Hill 8-yard run (Pete Stoyanovich kick), 10:18. Chiefs 13–3. **Drive: 5 plays, 57 yards, 2:34.**
- KC – Greg Hill 34-yard pass from Steve Bono (Pete Stoyanovich kick), 7:45. Chiefs 20–3. **Drive: 4 plays, 61 yards, 2:02.**
- GB – Chris Jacke 49-yard field goal, 0:00. Chiefs 20–6. **Drive: 5 plays, 28 yards, 0:56.**

**Third quarter**

- KC – Greg Hill 24-yard run (Pete Stoyanovich kick), 14:38. Chiefs 27–6. **Drive: 1 play, 24 yards, 0:07.**
- GB – Don Beebe 25-yard pass from Brett Favre (Chris Jacke kick), 3:50. Chiefs 27–13. **Drive: 8 plays, 83 yards, 4:27.**

**Fourth quarter**

- GB – Derrick Mayes 6-yard pass from Brett Favre (Pete Stoyanovich kick), 1:02. Chiefs 27–20. **Drive: 7 plays, 74 yards, 0:45.**

**Top passers**

- GB – Brett Favre – 27/49, 314 yards, 2 TD, INT
- KC – Steve Bono – 9/22, 204 yards, TD

**Top rushers**

- GB – Edgar Bennett – 12 rushes, 37 yards
- KC – Greg Hill – 14 rushes, 94 yards, 2 TD

**Top receivers**

- GB – Dorsey Levens – 5 receptions, 83 yards
- KC – Sean LaChapelle – 2 receptions, 89 yards

==== Week 12: vs. Chicago Bears ====
Week 12: Chicago Bears at Kansas City Chiefs – Game summary

Quarter	1	2	3	4	Total
Bears	7	3	0	0	**10**
**Chiefs**	7	7	0	0	**14**

at Arrowhead Stadium, Kansas City, Missouri

- Date: November 17
- Game time: 12:00 p.m. CST
- Game weather: Sunny and cold, 33 °F (1 °C)
- Game attendance: 76,762
- Referee: Mike Carey
- TV announcers (Fox): Dick Stockton and Matt Millen
- Recap, Game Book

Game information

**First quarter**

- CHI – Raymont Harris 14-yard run (Jeff Jaeger kick), 11:32. Bears 7–0. **Drive: 7 plays, 75 yards, 3:28.**
- KC – Chris Penn 20-yard pass from Steve Bono (Pete Stoyanovich kick), 8:56. Tied 7–7. **Drive: 6 plays, 60 yards, 2:36.**

**Second quarter**

- KC – Kimble Anders 10-yard run (Pete Stoyanovich kick), 4:30. Chiefs 14–7. **Drive: 9 plays, 69 yards, 4:44.**
- CHI – Jeff Jaeger 49-yard field goal, 0:15. Chiefs 14–10. **Drive: 9 plays, 35 yards, 1:04.**

**Third quarter**

- No scoring plays.

**Fourth quarter**

- No scoring plays.

**Top passers**

- CHI – Dave Krieg – 21/36, 232 yards, INT
- KC – Steve Bono – 14/24, 154 yards, TD, INT

**Top rushers**

- CHI – Raymont Harris – 17 rushes, 35 yards, TD
- KC – Marcus Allen – 16 rushes, 64 yards

**Top receivers**

- CHI – Curtis Conway – 4 receptions, 58 yards
- KC – Chris Penn – 5 receptions, 71 yards, TD

==== Week 13: vs. San Diego Chargers ====
Week 13: San Diego Chargers at Kansas City Chiefs – Game summary

Quarter	1	2	3	4	Total
**Chargers**	7	14	7	0	**28**
Chiefs	0	0	0	14	**14**

at Arrowhead Stadium, Kansas City, Missouri

- Date: November 24
- Game time: 12:00 p.m. CST
- Game weather: Cold and cloudy, 25 °F (−4 °C)
- Game attendance: 69,472
- Referee: Johnny Grier
- TV announcers (NBC): Don Criqui and Beasley Reece
- Recap, Game Book

Game information

**First quarter**

- SD – Tony Martin 20-yard pass from Stan Humphries (John Carney kick), 6:24. Chargers 7–0. **Drive: 4 plays, 28 yards, 1:23.**

**Second quarter**

- SD – Leonard Russell 4-yard run (John Carney kick), 11:07. Chargers 14–0. **Drive: 10 plays, 97 yards, 5:20.**
- SD – Tony Martin 10-yard pass from Stan Humphries (John Carney kick), 3:37. Chargers 21–0. **Drive: 9 plays, 79 yards, 4:42.**

**Third quarter**

- SD – Leonard Russell 1-yard run (John Carney kick), 7:34. Chargers 28–0. **Drive: 10 plays, 74 yards, 5:15.**

**Fourth quarter**

- KC – Chris Penn 17-yard pass from Rich Gannon (Pete Stoyanovich kick), 8:54. Chargers 28–7. **Drive: 8 plays, 68 yards, 2:58.**
- KC – Todd McNair 10-yard pass from Rich Gannon (Pete Stoyanovich kick), 2:54. Chargers 28–14. **Drive: 11 plays, 80 yards, 2:50.**

**Top passers**

- SD – Stan Humphries – 13/26, 252 yards, 2 TD
- KC – Rich Gannon – 22/31, 226 yards, 2 TD

**Top rushers**

- SD – Leonard Russell – 32 rushes, 88 yards, 2 TD
- KC – Greg Hill – 6 rushes, 45 yards

**Top receivers**

- SD – Tony Martin – 5 receptions, 148 yards, 2 TD
- KC – Chris Penn – 6 receptions, 90 yards, TD

==== Week 14: at Detroit Lions ====
Thanksgiving Day games

Week 14: Kansas City Chiefs at Detroit Lions – Game summary

Quarter	1	2	3	4	Total
**Chiefs**	7	7	0	14	**28**
Lions	0	14	7	3	**24**

at Pontiac Silverdome, Pontiac, Michigan

- Date: November 28
- Game time: 12:30 p.m. EST/11:30 a.m. CST
- Game weather: None (indoor stadium)
- Game attendance: 75,079
- Referee: Gary Lane
- TV announcers (NBC): Dick Enberg, Paul Maguire, Phil Simms and Jim Gray
- Recap, Game Book

Game information

**First quarter**

- KC – Marcus Allen 1-yard run (Pete Stoyanovich kick), 3:49. Chiefs 7–0. **Drive: 9 plays, 91 yards, 4:44.**

**Second quarter**

- DET – Johnnie Morton 16-yard pass from Scott Mitchell (Jason Hanson kick), 14:54. Tied 7–7. **Drive: 8 plays, 73 yards, 3:55.**
- DET – Mike Wells fumble recovery in end zone (Jason Hanson kick), 12:20. Lions 14–7.
- KC – Chris Penn 17-yard pass from Rich Gannon (Pete Stoyanovich kick), 8:04. Tied 14–14. **Drive: 3 plays, 24 yards, 1:26.**

**Third quarter**

- DET – Barry Sanders 13-yard run (Jason Hason kick), 0:21. Lions 21–14. **Drive: 14 plays, 81 yards, 7:06.**

**Fourth quarter**

- KC – Derrick Walker 9-yard pass from Rich Gannon (Pete Stoyanovich kick), 10:54. Tied 21–21. **Drive: 9 plays, 64 yards, 4:27.**
- DET – Jason Hanson 21-yard field goal, 8:41. Lions 24–21. **Drive: 7 plays, 45 yards, 2:13.**
- KC – Marcus Allen 1-yard run (Pete Stoyanovich kick), 0:46. Chiefs 28–24. **Drive: 15 plays, 76 yards, 7:55.**

**Top passers**

- KC – Rich Gannon – 15/18, 120 yards, 2 TD
- DET – Scott Mitchell – 18/29, 247 yards, TD, 2 INT

**Top rushers**

- KC – Greg Hill – 17 rushes, 103 yards
- DET – Barry Sanders – 20 rushes, 77 yards, TD

**Top receivers**

- KC – Kimble Anders – 5 receptions, 44 yards
- DET – Brett Perriman – 8 receptions, 131 yards

==== Week 15: at Oakland Raiders ====
Week 15: Kansas City Chiefs at Oakland Raiders – Game summary

Quarter	1	2	3	4	Total
Chiefs	0	0	0	7	**7**
**Raiders**	10	0	16	0	**26**

at Oakland–Alameda County Coliseum, Oakland, California

- Date: December 9
- Game time: 8:00 p.m. CST/6:00 p.m. PST
- Game weather: Overcast, rainy skies, 57 °F (14 °C)
- Game attendance: 57,082
- Referee: Red Cashion
- TV announcers (ABC): Al Michaels, Frank Gifford, Dan Dierdorf and Lynn Swann
- Recap, Game Book

Game information

**First quarter**

- OAK – Andrew Glover 1-yard pass from Jeff Hostetler (Cole Ford kick), 6:59. Raiders 7–0. **Drive: 3 plays, 46 yards, 1:35.**
- OAK – Cole Ford 43-yard field goal, 3:47. Raiders 10–0. **Drive: 4 plays, 4 yards, 0:57.**

**Second quarter**

- No scoring plays.

**Third quarter**

- OAK – Penalty on Rich Gannon enforced in end zone for a Safety, 14:33. Raiders 12–0.
- OAK – Derrick Fenner 23-yard pass from Jeff Hostetler (Cole Ford kick), 4:31. Raiders 19–0. **Drive: 6 plays, 98 yards, 3:42.**
- OAK – Tim Brown 34-yard pass from Jeff Hostetler (Cole Ford kick), 0:52. Raiders 26–0. **Drive: 7 plays, 57 yards, 2:27.**

**Fourth quarter**

- KC – Sean LaChapelle 12-yard pass from Rich Gannon (Pete Stoyanovich kick), 14:23. Raiders 26–7. **Drive: 7 plays, 43 yards, 1:29.**

**Top passers**

- KC – Rich Gannon – 12/33, 88 yards, TD, INT
- OAK – Jeff Hostetler – 13/27, 150 yards, 3 TD

**Top rushers**

- KC – Marcus Allen – 14 rushes, 64 yards
- OAK – Napoleon Kaufman – 8 rushes, 109 yards

**Top receivers**

- KC – Sean LaChapelle – 2 receptions, 31 yards, TD
- OAK – Tim Brown – 3 receptions, 67 yards, TD

==== Week 16: vs. Indianapolis Colts ====
Week 16: Indianapolis Colts at Kansas City Chiefs – Game summary

Quarter	1	2	3	4	Total
**Colts**	14	0	0	10	**24**
Chiefs	0	10	0	9	**19**

at Arrowhead Stadium, Kansas City, Missouri

- Date: December 15
- Game time: 3:00 p.m. CST
- Game weather: Clear, 36 °F (2 °C)
- Game attendance: 71,136
- Referee: Tom White
- TV announcers (NBC): Dan Hicks and Bob Trumpy
- Recap, Game Book

Game information

**First quarter**

- IND – Marvin Harrison 3-yard pass from Jim Harbaugh (Cary Blanchard kick), 6:59. Colts 7–0. **Drive: 13 plays, 71 yards, 8:01.**
- IND – Marvin Harrison 37-yard pass from Jim Harbaugh (Cary Blanchard kick), 1:14. Colts 14–0. **Drive: 4 plays, 85 yards, 1:43.**

**Second quarter**

- KC – Kimble Anders 18-yard pass from Rich Gannon (Pete Stoyanovich kick), 12:57. Colts 14–7. **Drive: 7 plays, 60 yards, 3:17.**
- KC – Pete Stoyanovich 30-yard field goal, 4:07. Colts 14–10. **Drive: 10 plays, 57 yards, 4:00.**

**Third quarter**

- No scoring plays.

**Fourth quarter**

- IND – Cary Blanchard 22-yard field goal, 12:52. Colts 17–10. **Drive: 10 plays, 59 yards, 3:30.**
- KC – Pete Stoyanovich 30-yard field goal, 10:26. Colts 17–13. **Drive: 6 plays, 10 yards, 2:26.**
- IND – Marvin Harrison 5-yard pass from Jim Harbaugh (Cary Blanchard kick), 3:48. Colts 24–13. **Drive: 12 plays, 76 yards, 3:38.**
- KC – Kimble Anders 5-yard pass from Steve Bono (run failed), 1:17. Colts 24–19. **Drive: 13 plays, 70 yards, 2:31.**

**Top passers**

- IND – Jim Harbaugh – 16/28, 227 yards, 3 TD
- KC – Steve Bono – 18/33, 194 yards, TD

**Top rushers**

- IND – Marshall Faulk – 20 rushes, 71 yards
- KC – Marcus Allen – 12 rushes, 51 yards

**Top receivers**

- IND – Marvin Harrison – 6 receptions, 103 yards, 3 TD
- KC – Kimble Anders – 9 receptions, 96 yards, 2 TD

==== Week 17: at Buffalo Bills ====
Week 17: Kansas City Chiefs at Buffalo Bills – Game summary

Quarter	1	2	3	4	Total
Chiefs	3	3	3	0	**9**
**Bills**	0	3	3	14	**20**

at Rich Stadium, Orchard Park, New York

- Date: December 22
- Game time: 1:00 p.m. EST/12:00 p.m. CST
- Game weather: Light snow, 33 °F (1 °C)
- Game attendance: 68,671
- Referee: Gerry Austin
- TV announcers (NBC): Marv Albert, Sam Wyche and Jim Gray
- Recap, Game Book

Game information

**First quarter**

- KC – Pete Stoyanovich 19-yard field goal, 5:18. Chiefs 3–0. **Drive: 12 plays, 72 yards, 6:52.**

**Second quarter**

- KC – Pete Stoyanovich 24-yard field goal, 10:46. Chiefs 6–0. **Drive: 7 plays, 9 yards, 4:07.**
- BUF – Steve Christie 41-yard field goal, 2:54. Chiefs 6–3. **Drive: 8 plays, 32 yards, 3:14.**

**Third quarter**

- KC – Pete Stoyanovich 26-yard field goal, 11:22. Chiefs 9–3. **Drive: 7 plays, 19 yards, 3:25.**
- BUF – Steve Christie 42-yard field goal, 2:16. Chiefs 9–6. **Drive: 6 plays, 26 yards, 2:20.**

**Fourth quarter**

- BUF – Tony Cline 4-yard pass from Jim Kelly (Steve Christie kick), 12:23. Bills 13–9. **Drive: 6 plays, 72 yards, 2:42.**
- BUF – Quinn Early 4-yard pass from Jim Kelly (Steve Christie kick), 4:13. Bills 20–9. **Drive: 6 plays, 41 yards, 2:55.**

**Top passers**

- KC – Steve Bono – 14/28, 138 yards, 2 INT
- BUF – Jim Kelly – 20/29, 279 yards, 2 TD, INT

**Top rushers**

- KC – Marcus Allen – 20 rushes, 87 yards
- BUF – Thurman Thomas – 17 rushes, 43 yards

**Top receivers**

- KC – Kimble Anders – 7 receptions, 49 yards
- BUF – Steve Tasker – 4 receptions, 87 yards

External videos
- 1996 Chiefs at Bills – NBC game broadcast
- 1996 Chiefs at Bills – NFL Primetime

== Standings ==
AFC West
	W	L	T	PCT	PF	PA	STK
^{(1)} Denver Broncos	13	3	0	.813	391	275	L1
Kansas City Chiefs	9	7	0	.563	297	300	L3
San Diego Chargers	8	8	0	.500	310	376	W1
Oakland Raiders	7	9	0	.438	340	293	L2
Seattle Seahawks	7	9	0	.438	317	376	W1
