= 1998 Frankfurt Galaxy season =

NFL Europe team season

- General manager: Chris Heyne
- Head coach: Dick Curl
- Home stadium: Waldstadion

Results
- Record: 7–3
- Division place: 1st
- Playoffs: Lost World Bowl '98

The 1998 Frankfurt Galaxy season was the sixth season for the franchise in the NFL Europe League (NFLEL). The team was led by head coach Dick Curl in his first year, and played its home games at Waldstadion in Frankfurt, Germany. They finished the regular season in first place with a record of seven wins and three losses. In World Bowl '98, Frankfurt lost to the Rhein Fire 34–10.

== Offseason ==
=== NFL Europe League draft ===
1998 Frankfurt Galaxy NFLEL draft selections
Draft order			Player name	Position	College
Round	Choice	Overall	Player name	Position	College
1	2	2	Ben Lynch	C	California
2	2	8	Robert Barr	OT	Rutgers
3	5	17	Alundis Brice	CB	Mississippi
4	2	20	James Burton	CB	Fresno State
5	5	29	Mel Agee	DE	Illinois
6	2	32	Sylvester Wright	LB	Kansas
7	5	41	Dana Howard	LB	Illinois
8	2	44	Billy Williams	WR	Tennessee
9	5	53	Jamie Vandervelt	G	Wisconsin
10	2	56	Marquis Walker	CB	Southeast Missouri State
11	5	65	Harold Gragg	DE	Wake Forest
12	2	68	Mike Fredenburg	OT	Georgia
13	5	77	K. D. Williams	LB	Henderson State
14	2	80	Demetrius Allen	WR	Virginia
15	5	89	Sedric Clark	LB	Tulsa
16	2	92	J Ina	G	Miami
17	5	101	Tony Corbin	QB	Sacramento State
18	2	104	Don Reynolds	DT	Virginia
19	5	113	Marcellus Mostella	LB	Auburn
20	2	116	Paul Lacoste	LB	Mississippi State
21	5	125	Jermaine Chaney	RB	Indiana
22	2	128	David Bailey	OT	James Madison
23	5	137	Michael Blair	RB	Ball State
24	2	140	Todd Hunter	OT	Tulane
25	5	149	Byron Capers	CB	Florida State
26	2	152	Juan Daniels	WR	Georgia
27	4	159	Pete DiMario	OT	Alabama
28	1	161	Moses Regular	TE	Missouri Valley State

=== NFL allocations ===
Player name	Position	College	NFL team
Patrick Augafa	C	Iowa State	Washington Redskins
Darrick Branch	WR	Hawaii	Denver Broncos
Kenyan Branscomb	WR	Oregon State	Oakland Raiders
Hillary Butler	LB	Washington	Denver Broncos
Anthony Cobbs	CB	UCLA	New Orleans Saints
Scott Curry	OT	Amherst College	Oakland Raiders
Jerome Davis	DE	Minnesota	Detroit Lions
Chris Dittoe	QB	Indiana	Detroit Lions
Mitchell Galloway	WR	East Carolina	Buffalo Bills
Aaron Henne	G	Maryland	Pittsburgh Steelers
Damon Huard	QB	Washington	Miami Dolphins
Bill Kushner	P/K	Boston College	Cincinnati Bengals
Curtis McGee	OT	Georgia Tech	New England Patriots
Reynard Rutherford	RB	California	San Francisco 49ers
Artie Ulmer	LB	Valdosta State	Minnesota Vikings
Vann Washington	S	West Virginia	Kansas City Chiefs

== Personnel ==
=== Staff ===
1998 Frankfurt Galaxy (NFL Europe) staff
Front office: General Manager – Chris Heyne; Deputy General Manager – Tilman Engel; Head coaches: Head Coach/Quarterbacks – Dick Curl; Offensive coaches: Offensive Coordinator/Wide Receivers – Wes Chandler; National Coach/Running Backs – Alessandro Cinelli; Offensive Line – Bob Lord	Defensive coaches: Defensive Coordinator/Linebackers – Steve Spagnuolo; Defensive Line – Bob Bicknell; Defensive Backs – Dan Daniel

=== Roster ===
1998 Frankfurt Galaxy final roster
Quarterbacks: 14 Mark Butterfield; 13 Chris Dittoe; 19 Damon Huard; Running backs: 22 Jermaine Chaney; 33 Reynard Rutherford; Wide receivers: 81 Mario Bailey; 8 Darrick Branch; 82 Mitchell Galloway; Tight ends: 85 Vince Marrow; 89 Moses Regular	Offensive linemen: 65 Patrick Augafa G; 70 David Bailey G/C; 64 Robert Barr T; 74 Pete DiMario T; 62 Ben Lynch C; 69 Curtis McGee G/T; 66 Jamie Vanderveldt G; Defensive linemen: 92 Mel Agee DE/NT; 93 Jerome Davis DE; 96 Harold Gragg DE; 90 Israel Stanley DE; 91 Bruce Walker NT	Linebackers: 56 Tuineau Alipate ILB; 50 Shawn Banks ILB; 52 Sedric Clark ILB; 54 Artie Ulmer OLB; 56 K. D. Williams OLB; 55 Sylvester Wright OLB; Defensive backs: 21 Kenyan Branscomb CB; 27 Anthony Cobbs CB; 43 Greg Evans S; 32 Chris Hall S; 26 Alonzo Hampton CB; 28 Kenny McEntyre CB; 23 Mike Reed CB; Special teams: 10 Bill Kushner P	National players: 67 (Germany) Stefan Gamlin T; 94 (Germany) Raphael Graetz OLB; 11 (Germany) Jörg Heckenbach WR; 86 (Germany) Werner Hippler TE; 9 (Germany) Ralf Kleinmann K; 75 (Germany) Marcus Richter DE; 24 (Germany) Ingo Seibert RB; Rookies in italics

== Standings ==
NFL Europe League
Team	W	L	T	PCT	PF	PA	Home	Road	STK
Frankfurt Galaxy	7	3	0	.700	177	163	3–2	4–1	W4
Rhein Fire	7	3	0	.700	198	142	4–1	3–2	L2
Amsterdam Admirals	7	3	0	.700	205	174	4–1	3–2	W3
Barcelona Dragons	4	6	0	.400	185	200	3–2	1–4	L3
England Monarchs	3	7	0	.300	158	205	2–3	1–4	W2
Scottish Claymores	2	8	0	.200	153	192	2–3	0–5	L3

== Game summaries ==
=== Week 5: vs Rhein Fire ===
Week Five: Rhein Fire at Frankfurt Galaxy – Game summary

Quarter	1	2	3	4	Total
Rhein	3	7	14	7	31
Frankfurt	0	0	0	14	14

at Waldstadion, Frankfurt, Germany

- Date: Saturday, May 2
- Game time: 7:00 p.m. CEST
- Game attendance: 41,123
- Referee: Tony Corrente

Game information

First quarter

- Rhein – 28-yard field goal by Manfred Burgsmüller, 6:06.

Second quarter

- Rhein – Marcus Robinson 58-yard touchdown reception from Mike Quinn, Manfred Burgsmüller kick good, 1:45.

Third quarter

- Rhein – Derrick Clark 1-yard touchdown run, Manfred Burgsmüller kick good, 6:08.
- Rhein – Derrick Clark 1-yard touchdown run, Manfred Burgsmüller kick good, 0:46.

Fourth quarter

- Frankfurt – Mario Bailey 7-yard touchdown reception from Damon Huard, Ralf Kleinmann kick good, 9:30.
- Rhein – Derrick Clark 3-yard touchdown run, Manfred Burgsmüller kick good, 4:59.
- Frankfurt – Mario Bailey 22-yard touchdown reception from Chris Dittoe, Ralf Kleinmann kick good, 0:02.

=== Week 6: at Barcelona Dragons ===
Week Six: Frankfurt Galaxy at Barcelona Dragons – Game summary

Quarter	1	2	3	4	Total
Frankfurt	0	2	0	0	2
Barcelona	7	0	21	3	31

at Estadi Olímpic de Montjuïc, Barcelona, Spain

- Date: Monday, May 11
- Game attendance: 6,800

=== Week 9: vs Scottish Claymores ===
Week Nine: Scottish Claymores at Frankfurt Galaxy – Game summary

Quarter	1	2	3	4	Total
Scotland	0	7	3	0	10
Frankfurt	7	0	0	14	21

at Waldstadion, Frankfurt, Germany

- Date: Sunday, May 31
- Game time: 7:00 p.m. CEST
- Game attendance: 35,264

=== World Bowl '98 ===
World Bowl '98: Rhein Fire vs Frankfurt Galaxy – Game summary

Quarter	1	2	3	4	Total
Rhein	10	7	7	10	34
Frankfurt	0	7	3	0	10

at Waldstadion, Frankfurt, Germany

- Date: Sunday, June 14
- Game time: 7:00 p.m. CEST
- Game attendance: 47,846
- TV announcers (Fox): Tim Ryan, Bill Maas and Ronnie Lott
