= 1998 Scottish Claymores season =

NFL Europe team season

- General manager: Dick Regan
- Head coach: Jim Criner
- Home stadium: Murrayfield Stadium; Hampden Park

Results
- Record: 2–8
- Division place: 6th
- Playoffs: Did not qualify

The 1998 Scottish Claymores season was the fourth year of competition for the franchise in the NFL Europe League (NFLEL). The team was led by head coach Jim Criner in his fourth year, and played its home games at Murrayfield Stadium in Edinburgh (four) and Hampden Park in Glasgow, Scotland (one). They finished the regular season in sixth place with a record of two wins and eight losses.

== Offseason ==
=== NFL Europe League draft ===
1998 Scottish Claymores NFLEL draft selections
Draft order			Player name	Position	College
Round	Choice	Overall	Player name	Position	College
1	4	4	J. J. Smith	RB	Kansas State
2	4	10	Kerry Hicks	DT	Colorado
3	3	15	Sam Manuel	LB	New Mexico State
3	6	18	Kerry Mock	LB	North Carolina
4	4	22	Eddie Cade	S	Arizona State
5	3	27	Miles Macik	WR	Pennsylvania
6	4	34	Tim Scharf	LB	Northwestern
7	3	39	Eric Lynch	RB	Grand Valley State
8	4	46	Cedric Samuel	CB	Alabama
9	3	51	Phillip Riley	WR	Florida State
10	4	58	Shea Little	WR	Eastern Oregon
11	3	63	Andy Jacobs	LB	California
12	4	70	Chris Brantley	WR	Rutgers
13	3	75	Matt Calhoun	RB	Ohio State
14	4	82	Ken Brown	LB	Virginia Tech
15	3	87	Sean Boyd	CB	North Carolina
16	4	94	Devin Kendall	TE	Arizona State
17	3	99	Paul McCallum	K	None
18	4	106	Carey Bender	RB	Coe College
19	3	111	Larry Echols	LB	Stephen F. Austin
20	4	118	Mike Ivey	DT	Wisconsin–LaCrosse
21	3	123	James Williams	CB	Texas Southern
22	4	130	Tom Beck	QB	Northern Colorado
23	3	135	Adrian Ioja	LB	San Diego State
24	4	142	James Johnson	S	Nevada
25	3	149	Barry Sims	OT	Utah

== Personnel ==
=== Staff ===
1998 Scottish Claymores staff
Front office: General Manager – Dick Regan; Assistant General Manager – Will Wilson; Head coaches: Head Coach/Offensive Line – Jim Criner; Offensive coaches: Offensive Coordinator/Quarterbacks – Jim Sochor; Receivers – Vince Alcalde	Defensive coaches: Defensive Coordinator/Linebackers – Myrel Moore; Defensive Line – Stan Jones; Defensive Backs – Richard Rodgers; Special teams coaches: National Coach/Special Teams Coordinator – Mike Kenny

=== Roster ===
1998 Scottish Claymores final roster
Quarterbacks: 13 Jim Ballard; 12 Tom Beck; 14 Mark Grieb; Running backs: 29 Carey Bender; 44 Steve Lee; 25 Eric Lynch (IR); 24 Dino Philyaw (IR); 33 J. J. Smith; 20 Vernon Turner; Wide receivers: 00 Chris Brantley; 15 Terence Davis; 84 Miles Macik; 80 Chris Miller; 82 Jerry Reese; Tight ends: 85 Willy Tate	Offensive linemen: 70 Joe Andruzzi G; 77 Wendall Gaines T; 79 Purvis Hunt G; 73 Mike Rockwood T; 66 Barry Stokes T; 65 Alan Symonette C/G; 63 Terrence Wisdom G; 72 Emmett Zitelli C; Defensive linemen: 93 Troy Bailey DT; 94 Steve Brannon DT; 97 John DeWitt DE; 96 Kerry Hicks DE; 92 Brad Keeney DT; 99 Mark Lee DE; 95 Bryan Proby DT	Linebackers: 59 Alan Campos OLB; 58 Shannon Jones OLB; 52 Sam Manuel OLB; 55 Kerry Mock MLB; 53 Tim Scharf OLB; Defensive backs: 39 Kory Blackwell CB; 27 Eddie Cade S; 22 Lee Cole CB/S; 36 Kwame Ellis CB; 23 James Johnson CB/S; 28 Cedric Samuel S; 26 Charles Swann CB; Special teams: 9 Jon Baker K	National players: 88 (Japan) Nachi Abe TE; 81 (Scotland) Scott Couper WR; 91 (England) Robert Flickinger DE; 86 (Japan) Masato Itai WR; 11 (Scotland) Gary Parker K; 50 (Republic of Ireland) Emmett Waldron MLB; 2 (Australia) David Wing P; Rookies in italics

== Standings ==
NFL Europe League
Team	W	L	T	PCT	PF	PA	Home	Road	STK
Frankfurt Galaxy	7	3	0	.700	177	163	3–2	4–1	W4
Rhein Fire	7	3	0	.700	198	142	4–1	3–2	L2
Amsterdam Admirals	7	3	0	.700	205	174	4–1	3–2	W3
Barcelona Dragons	4	6	0	.400	185	200	3–2	1–4	L3
England Monarchs	3	7	0	.300	158	205	2–3	1–4	W2
Scottish Claymores	2	8	0	.200	153	192	2–3	0–5	L3

== Game summaries ==
=== Week 9: at Frankfurt Galaxy ===
Week Nine: Scottish Claymores at Frankfurt Galaxy – Game summary

Quarter	1	2	3	4	Total
Scotland	0	7	3	0	10
Frankfurt	7	0	0	14	21

at Waldstadion, Frankfurt, Germany

- Date: Sunday, 31 May
- Game time: 7:00 p.m. CEST
- Game attendance: 35,264
