= Jake Delhomme =

American football player (born 1975)

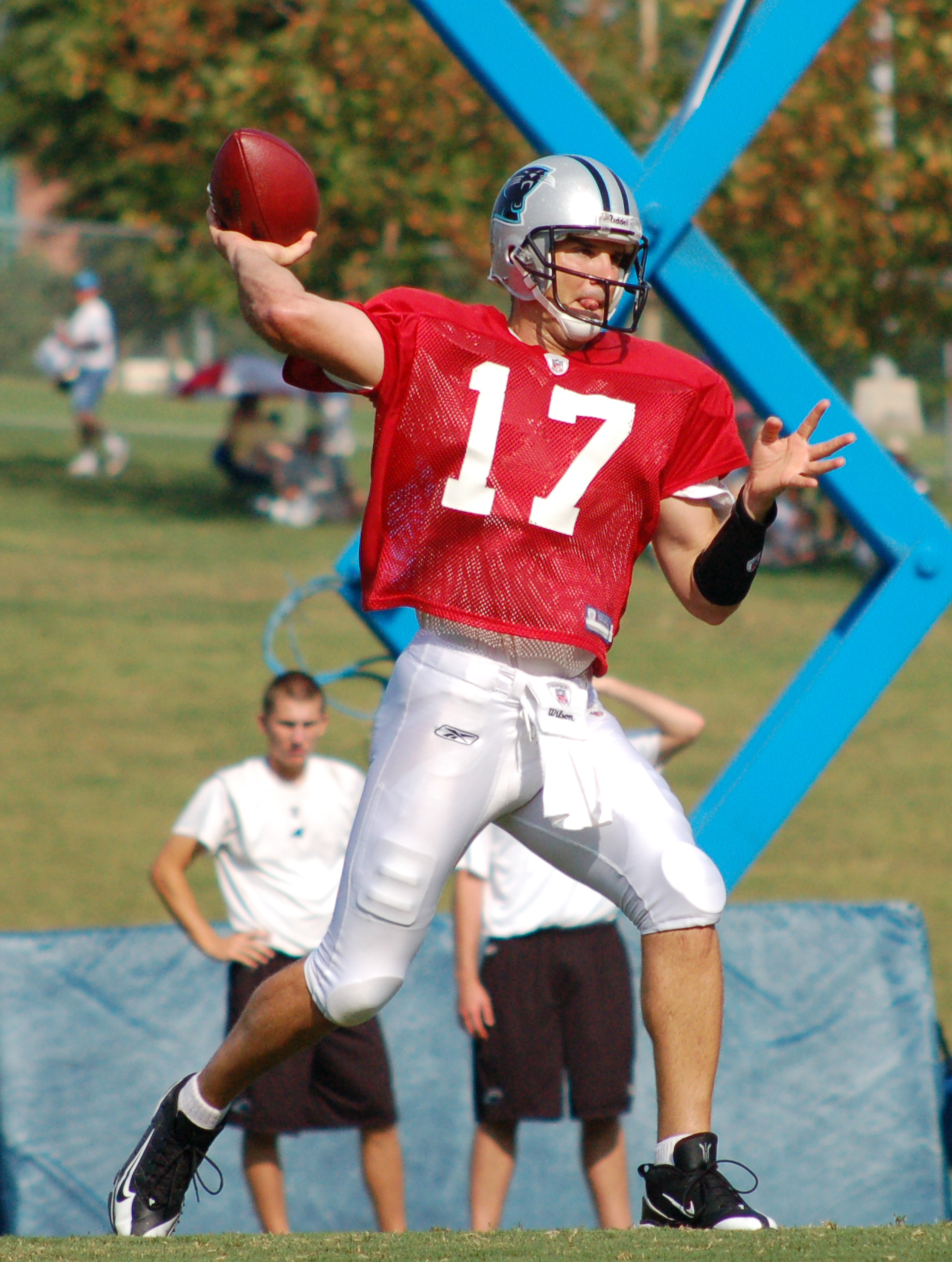
- Delhomme with the Carolina Panthers in 2008

No. 9, 12, 17
- Position: Quarterback

Personal information
- Born: January 10, 1975 (age 51); Breaux Bridge, Louisiana, U.S.
- Listed height: 6 ft 2 in (1.88 m)
- Listed weight: 215 lb (98 kg)

Career information
- High school: Teurlings Catholic (Lafayette, Louisiana)
- College: Southwestern Louisiana (1993–1996)
- NFL draft: 1997: undrafted

Career history
- New Orleans Saints (1997–2002); → Amsterdam Admirals (1998); → Frankfurt Galaxy (1999); Carolina Panthers (2003–2009); Cleveland Browns (2010); Houston Texans (2011)

Awards and highlights
- Pro Bowl (2005); Carolina Panthers Hall of Honor; World Bowl champion (1999); NFL record: Longest touchdown pass in a Super Bowl: 85 yards (XXXVIII, to Muhsin Muhammad)

Career NFL statistics
- Passing attempts: 2,932
- Passing completions: 1,741
- Completion percentage: 59.4%
- TD–INT: 126–101
- Passing yards: 20,975
- Passer rating: 81.3
- Stats at Pro Football Reference

Jake Christopher Delhomme (/dəˈloʊm/ də-LOHM; born January 10, 1975) is an American former professional football player who was a quarterback in the National Football League (NFL). Delhomme played college football at the University of Louisiana at Lafayette, then known as the University of Southwestern Louisiana, before being signed by the New Orleans Saints as an undrafted free agent after the 1997 NFL draft. Delhomme began his professional career as a practice squad player with the Saints in 1997 and 1998 and played in the NFL Europe for two years in between NFL seasons. Returning to the Saints, Delhomme played his first NFL games in 1999. Delhomme played as the Carolina Panthers starting quarterback from 2003 to 2009. Delhomme held many of Carolina's quarterback records until Cam Newton broke most of them. Delhomme led the team to Super Bowl XXXVIII in his first season with Carolina. After his departure from Carolina, Delhomme also played for the Cleveland Browns in 2010 and Houston Texans in 2011.

== Early life ==
Delhomme was born to Jerry and Marcia Delhomme, both Cajuns. Delhomme's grandfather bred horses, and his father was a jockey who began racing at eight years old. Delhomme has called horses his "first love", and he, his father, and his brother own and train thoroughbreds. Delhomme played both quarterback and defensive back for Teurlings Catholic; he made the all-state team in high school not as quarterback, but on defense. In addition, Delhomme was a scholar serving as Senior Beta Club president of his chapter in Louisiana.

== College career ==
Delhomme played college football for the University of Louisiana at Lafayette, then named the University of Southwestern Louisiana, his mother's alma mater. The only true freshman quarterback to start for a Division I school in 1993, his passer efficiency rating ranked second among NCAA freshmen quarterbacks. Playing on a team with future NFL wide receiver Brandon Stokley and offensive lineman Anthony Clement, the Ragin' Cajuns won the Big West Conference twice, and finished with three winning seasons. During his senior year, he led the Ragin' Cajuns to an improbable win over highly favored Texas A&M 29–22.

Delhomme finished his career as the school's all-time passing leader in yards and touchdowns. He started the last 43 games of his career, which was the longest among active quarterbacks at the time. Upon graduating, he was ranked 22nd in NCAA history for passing yards and 28th in total offense. He was inducted into the school's Athletic Hall of Fame in 2006.

== Professional career ==
=== New Orleans Saints and NFL Europe ===
Delhomme went undrafted in the 1997 NFL draft, but was later signed by the New Orleans Saints as an undrafted free agent. After spending the first season on the practice squad, he was assigned to the Amsterdam Admirals of NFL Europe as a backup quarterback to future NFL and Super Bowl MVP, Kurt Warner; Delhomme later said that "Being around someone as mature as Kurt was, that really inspired me". After another stint on the Saints' practice squad, he was sent back to NFL Europe, this time as a member of the Frankfurt Galaxy. The Galaxy operated under a rare two-quarterback strategy, utilizing both Delhomme and Pat Barnes; the pair was known as the "Double-Headed Quarterback Monster". The unorthodox strategy worked, as the Galaxy won World Bowl '99 over the Barcelona Dragons. Delhomme would later say about his time in Europe:

...I was able to go over and play, but we had some success and we just, we were a team. We were not the most talented team, but we just played together, had the right chemistry.

— Jake Delhomme,

Following his success in Europe, he was brought back to the New Orleans Saints as the full-time third-string quarterback. In his first NFL start against the Dallas Cowboys, he threw two touchdowns en route to a Saints victory, the team's third.

Delhomme continued to see limited playing time the following three seasons, as he was the backup to Aaron Brooks and Jeff Blake. He managed to lead all NFC quarterbacks in overall passer rating during the 2001 and 2002 preseasons. His success, coupled with the team's struggles, led fans to chant "We Want Jake, We Want Jake".

=== Carolina Panthers ===
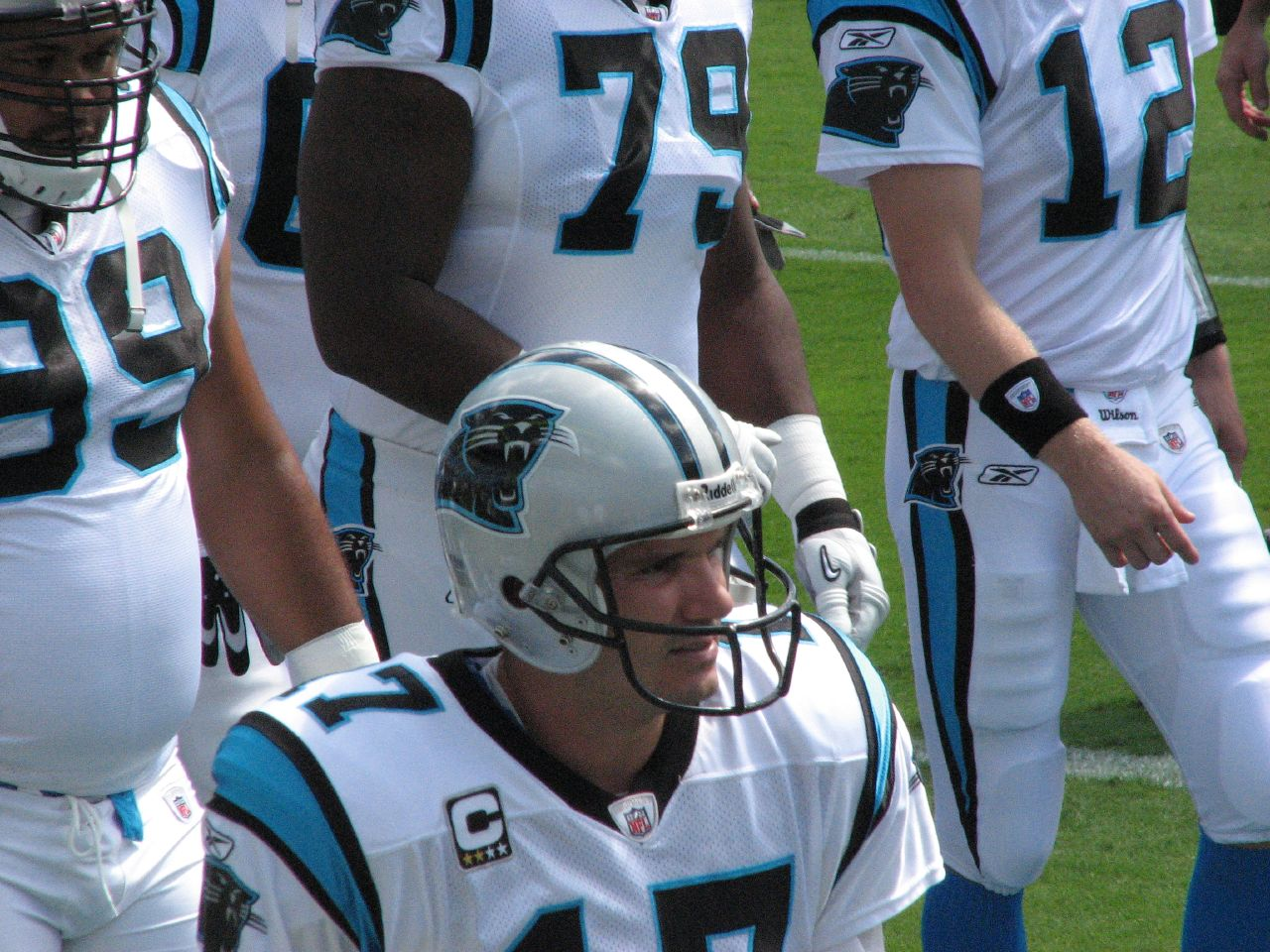
Delhomme played seven seasons with the Carolina Panthers from 2003 to 2009, including an appearance in Super Bowl XXXVIII.

With Aaron Brooks cemented as the starter in New Orleans, Delhomme was interested in fighting for a starting spot in the NFL. In the 2003 offseason, he met with representatives from both the Carolina Panthers and the Dallas Cowboys. He eventually signed with Carolina as a free agent. It was his performance against Dallas in 1999 that made new Panthers coach John Fox take notice.

The Panthers had been struggling, and were just one season removed from a dismal 1–15 season, during which they set a then-NFL record for consecutive losses in a single season. Although Rodney Peete was the Panthers' starter, Delhomme was looked at to be the future of the franchise. It did not take long for him to take over.

==== 2003 season and Super Bowl XXXVIII ====
At halftime of the 2003 season opener against the Jacksonville Jaguars, the Panthers were down 14–0. Delhomme took over for Peete and threw three touchdowns, the last coming in a fourth-down situation with just 16 seconds left in the game, to lead the Panthers to a comeback victory. He started the following week against the Tampa Bay Buccaneers, and proceeded to start every remaining game during the 2003 season. Including the playoffs, Delhomme led the Panthers on eight game-winning drives in the fourth quarter or overtime in the 2003 season, the most game-winning drives any QB has ever had in a single season. Delhomme led the Panthers on a Cinderella run through the playoffs, including a double-overtime victory against the St. Louis Rams. After beating the top-seeded Philadelphia Eagles in the NFC Championship game, the Panthers made it through to Super Bowl XXXVIII to face the New England Patriots. Despite his personal success in the game (16-of-33 for 323 yards, 3 passing touchdowns, no interceptions, and a 113.6 passer rating), as well as setting a record for longest offensive play from scrimmage in Super Bowl history (an 85-yard pass to Muhsin Muhammad), the Panthers fell on a last-minute field goal by Adam Vinatieri. Delhomme was seen standing on the field during the Patriots' post-game celebration; he later commented:

I wanted to catch up to the moment of what it feels like to be on the other side, to be on this side, the losing side. To let it sink in, to hurt, so when we start practice in the fall, the two-a-days and there are days during the season when I'm tired and I want to go home, but I need to watch that extra film. I want to get back there, but I want to get on the other side of that field. They rope you off, the losing team basically. I just want to get on the other side of that rope. I just wanted to watch and let it sink in and hurt a little bit. When I have a tough day, I'll just think about that feeling and it will make me dig down just a little deeper.

— Jake Delhomme, on losing the Super Bowl

==== 2004 season ====
The 2004 season proved bittersweet for Delhomme, as he posted career highs in pass attempts, completions, overall yardage, and touchdowns. The team was stricken with injuries, fielding five different combinations in their offensive line alone. Starting the season 1–7 after the early losses of running backs Stephen Davis and DeShaun Foster, as well as Steve Smith, their leading wide receiver, the Panthers rallied for a strong second half of the season. Delhomme finished the final eight games of the season with a passer rating of 102.8, fourth best in the league during that period. He also threw 17 touchdowns and just 4 interceptions en route to winning six of their last eight games. They ultimately positioned themselves for a playoff berth, but lost that chance with a final game loss to Delhomme's former team, the New Orleans Saints.

==== 2005 season ====
In 2005, Delhomme helped return the Panthers to the playoffs. In addition to the team's success, Delhomme had one of his most productive seasons as a quarterback. His 11 victories as a starting quarterback set a team record, which he later broke in 2008, and was later broken again by Cam Newton in 2015. He set career highs in completion percentage (60.2) and passer rating (88.1). In addition, his success led to Steve Smith leading the league in receptions, receiving yards, and receiving touchdowns, becoming only the third wide receiver to accomplish the "triple crown" in league history. Once again, he led the Panthers through the playoffs, including a shutout of the New York Giants, and a road victory over the Chicago Bears although the team ultimately fell to the Seattle Seahawks in the NFC Championship game.

==== 2006 season ====
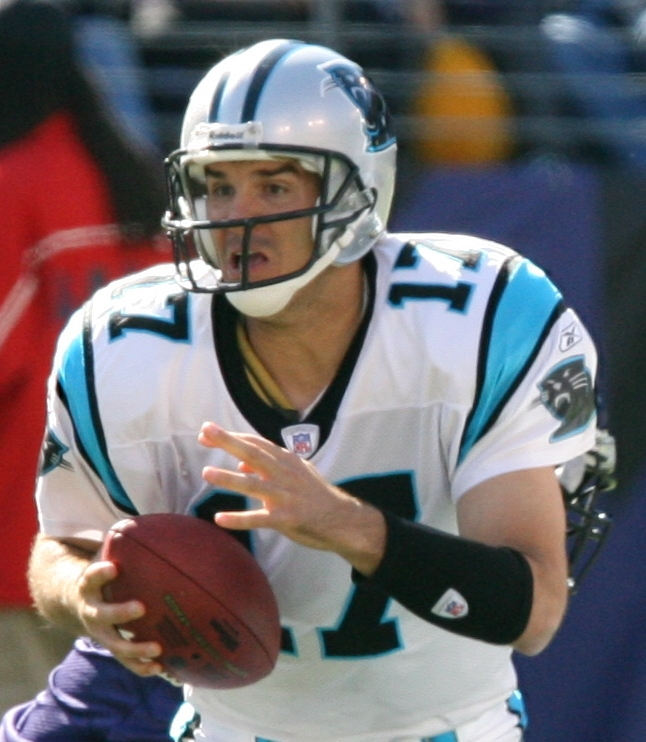
Delhomme in 2006

Delhomme started the 2006 season as the Panthers' quarterback, the first time in franchise history that the same quarterback was the starter for three straight seasons. He set records during the season by making 150 consecutive pass attempts without an interception, bettering Steve Beuerlein's previous team record. The following week against the Washington Redskins, he continued his assault on the team record books by breaking Beuerlein's records for completions and passing yards. Unfortunately, he injured his thumb in a game against the Philadelphia Eagles, and missed three games. During his time off, Chris Weinke started for the first time since the 2002 season, and in his first game shattered the team record for passing yards in a single game with 423 yards, but his three interceptions were costly as the Panthers lost the game to the New York Giants. Weinke could only manage a single victory in Delhomme's absence (against the rival Atlanta Falcons, only his second victory as an NFL starter), and Delhomme returned for the season finale against the New Orleans Saints.

==== 2007 season and injury ====
The 2007 season started with a win against the St. Louis Rams and a loss to the Houston Texans. However, in the third game of the season (against division rival Atlanta Falcons), Delhomme suffered an elbow injury that would set off a series of changes for the Panthers at the quarterback position. David Carr, who signed with Carolina in the off-season, took over as the Panthers' starting quarterback. After Carr injured his back in a defeat of the New Orleans Saints, the Panthers signed Vinny Testaverde, who started the next game against the Arizona Cardinals just four days later, and in the process became the oldest starting quarterback to win a game in the NFL. However, an injury to Testaverde coupled with Carr's spinal cord injury led to rookie Matt Moore starting in week 15 against the Seattle Seahawks, a game he won. Meanwhile, Delhomme opted for season ending Tommy John surgery on the elbow after two weeks of testing his arm.

==== 2008 season and return ====
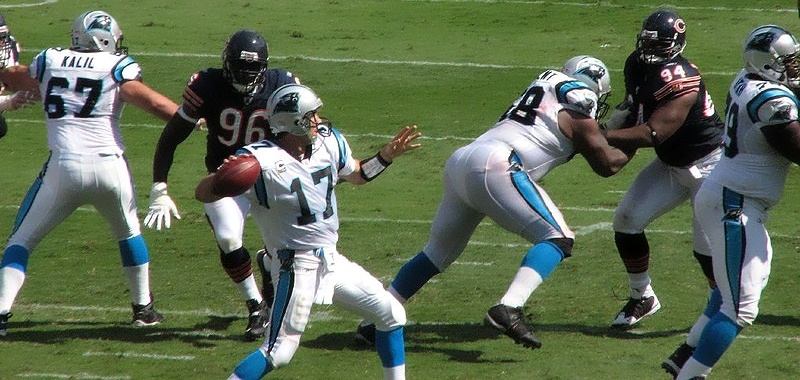
Delhomme prepares to pass in a game against the Chicago Bears on September 14, 2008.

Delhomme returned to the starting position for the 2008 season. In the first game of the 2008 season, Delhomme restarted his career by coming back on the San Diego Chargers with a touchdown pass on fourth down as time expired to win the game. This is similar to his debut game in 2003. After finishing the regular season 12–4, tying the Panthers' 2nd best record in franchise history, the Panthers were eliminated from the playoffs when on January 10, 2009, on his 34th birthday, Delhomme threw for a career worst five interceptions (and lost one fumble) against the Arizona Cardinals in the divisional round of the playoffs, ending the season with an overall record of 12–5 including the loss in the playoffs.

==== 2009 season ====
On April 23, 2009, the Panthers signed Delhomme to a 5-year extension worth $42.5 million, with a $20 million guarantee, putting him under contract through 2014. In the season opener loss against the Philadelphia Eagles, Delhomme went 7 of 17 for 73 yards with four interceptions and a lost fumble, before getting benched for journeyman Josh McCown. Delhomme threw game-ending interceptions the next 2 games, and despite throwing for 2 touchdowns and 7 interceptions with a 54.3 rating through the first 3 games, coach John Fox kept Delhomme as the Panthers' starting quarterback. Steve Smith jokingly told Delhomme after their loss against the Eagles "I never liked you as a quarterback." After the team's bye week, Delhomme still struggled. In his next three games, he had 2 more touchdowns to 6 more interceptions. In the next four games however, Delhomme only threw 1 interception. In spite of this improved performance, the team went 2–2 in those 4 games. Delhomme's bad performance continued with a 0 TD, 4 INT game against the New York Jets. During the loss to the Jets, Delhomme broke a finger on his throwing hand and was replaced by backup Matt Moore for the next two games, a 16–6 win over the Tampa Bay Buccaneers and a 20–10 loss to the New England Patriots. After those games, Moore started to heat up. He beat the Minnesota Vikings 26–7, then beat the Giants in their final game at Giants Stadium with a 41–9 win, and went on to beat the New Orleans Saints 23–10.

Delhomme was placed on season-ending injured reserve on December 24, 2009, and was released by the Panthers on March 5, 2010.

=== Cleveland Browns ===
On March 13, 2010, Delhomme signed a two-year deal with the Cleveland Browns. Delhomme won the starting quarterback job over Seneca Wallace after competing with him during training camp. However, he suffered a high ankle sprain during the second quarter of the Browns' first game of the season, a loss to the Tampa Bay Buccaneers (Delhomme had been notably grounded and thrown to the ground by Lions defensive tackle Ndamukong Suh, in a preseason game.) Delhomme saw action again midway through the team's Week 5 game after Wallace also injured his ankle. However, he was noticeably not 100% while playing and ultimately re-injured his ankle. Delhomme started against his former team the Carolina Panthers, after Colt McCoy suffered a high ankle sprain. It was Delhomme's first start since Week 1. For the season, he threw two touchdowns and seven interceptions while going 2–3 as a starter.

On July 28, 2011, he was released by Cleveland.

=== Houston Texans ===
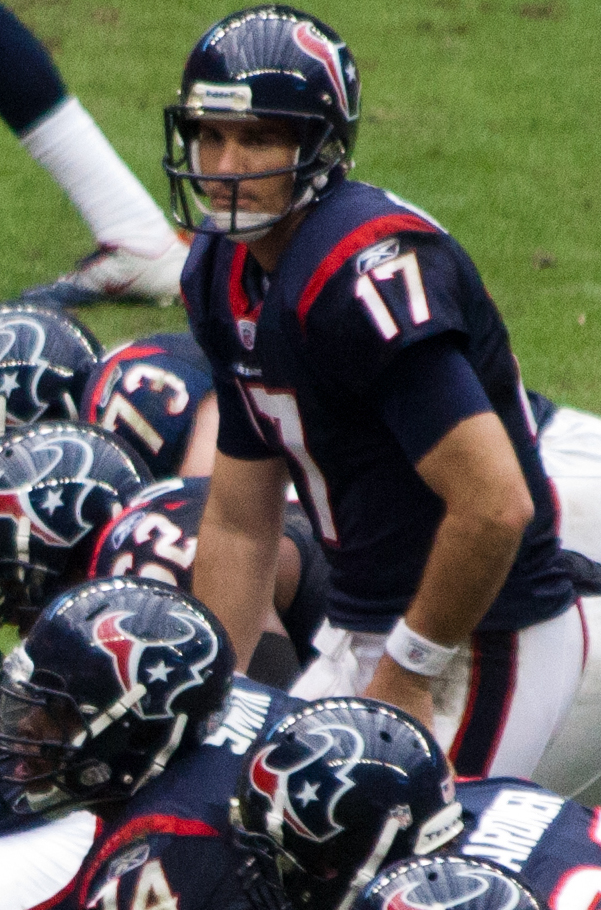
Delhomme played for the Houston Texans for one game on January 1, 2012

Delhomme signed with the Houston Texans on November 29, 2011, after quarterbacks Matt Schaub and Matt Leinart went down with season-ending injuries. Despite his experience, Delhomme was signed to back up rookie fifth-round draft pick T. J. Yates, as Yates had been with the team the entire season.

Delhomme entered the Texans' season finale against the Titans after Yates suffered a bruised throwing shoulder. He would go on to lead his team on a potential game-winning drive, completing 18 of 28 passes for 211 yards and a touchdown. But the Texans would lose 23–22 after a botched snap on a two-point attempt play. After the season ended, Delhomme told media that he would most likely retire.

== Career statistics ==
=== NFL ===
==== Regular season ====
Year	Team	Games			Passing								Rushing				Sacked		Fumbles	
Year	Team	GP	GS	Record	Cmp	Att	Pct	Yds	Y/A	TD	Int	Rtg	Att	Yds	Avg	TD	Sck	YdsL	Fum	Lost
1997	NO	0	0	DNP																
1998	NO	0	0	DNP																
1999	NO	2	2	1−1	42	76	55.3	521	6.9	3	5	62.4	11	72	6.5	2	6	42	1	1
2000	NO	0	0	DNP																
2001	NO	0	0	DNP																
2002	NO	4	0	—	8	10	80.0	113	11.3	0	0	113.7	4	−2	−0.5	0	0	0	0	0
2003	CAR	16	15	10−5	266	449	59.2	3,219	7.2	19	16	80.6	42	39	0.9	1	23	168	15	4
2004	CAR	16	16	7−9	310	533	58.2	3,886	7.3	29	15	87.3	25	71	2.8	1	33	246	12	5
2005	CAR	16	16	11−5	262	435	60.2	3,421	7.9	24	16	88.1	24	31	1.3	1	28	214	12	6
2006	CAR	13	13	7−6	263	431	61.0	2,805	6.5	17	11	82.6	18	12	0.7	0	22	167	6	4
2007	CAR	3	3	2−1	55	86	64.0	624	7.3	8	1	111.8	6	26	4.3	0	5	46	1	0
2008	CAR	16	16	12−4	246	414	59.4	3,288	7.9	15	12	84.7	20	21	1.1	2	20	130	5	3
2009	CAR	11	11	4−7	178	321	55.5	2,015	6.3	8	18	59.4	17	60	3.5	0	23	187	6	3
2010	CLE	5	4	2−2	93	149	62.4	872	5.9	2	7	63.4	8	−2	−0.3	0	6	49	3	1
2011	HOU	1	0	—	18	28	64.3	211	7.5	1	0	99.0	0	0	—	0	2	18	1	1
Career		103	96	56−40	1,741	2,932	59.4	20,975	7.2	126	101	81.3	175	328	1.9	7	168	1,267	62	28

==== Postseason ====
Year	Team	Games			Passing								Rushing				Sacked		Fumbles	
Year	Team	GP	GS	Record	Cmp	Att	Pct	Yds	Y/A	TD	Int	Rtg	Att	Yds	Avg	TD	Sck	YdsL	Fum	Lost
2000	NO	0	0	DNP																
2003	CAR	4	4	3−1	59	102	57.8	987	9.7	6	1	106.1	10	−1	−0.1	0	8	49	2	1
2005	CAR	3	3	2−1	54	90	60.0	655	7.3	5	4	82.4	5	24	4.8	0	6	47	3	0
2008	CAR	1	1	0−1	17	34	50.0	205	6.0	1	5	39.1	0	0	—	0	2	11	1	1
2011	HOU	0	0	DNP																
Career		8	8	5−3	130	226	57.5	1,847	8.2	12	10	83.3	15	23	1.5	0	16	107	6	2

=== NFL Europe ===
Year	Team	Passing								Rushing				Sacked	
Year	Team	Cmp	Att	Pct	Yds	Y/A	TD	Int	Rtg	Att	Yds	Y/A	TD	Sck	SckY
1998	Amsterdam Admirals	15	47	31.9	247	5.3	0	4	15.1	2	20	10.0	0	4	29
1999	Frankfurt Galaxy	136	202	67.3	1,410	7.0	12	5	96.8	21	126	6.0	0	18	119
Career		151	249	60.6	1,657	6.7	12	9	81.4	23	146	6.3	0	22	148

=== College ===
Season	Team	Passing								Rushing			
Season	Team	Cmp	Att	Pct	Yds	Y/A	TD	Int	Rtg	Att	Yds	Avg	TD
1993	Southwestern Louisiana	145	259	56.0	1,842	7.1	14	12	124.3	58	-81	-1.4	1
1994	Southwestern Louisiana	119	259	45.9	1,712	6.6	10	18	100.3	63	-186	-3.0	4
1995	Southwestern Louisiana	190	351	54.1	2,761	7.9	20	10	133.3	51	8	0.2	1
1996	Southwestern Louisiana	201	377	53.3	2,901	7.7	20	17	126.4	58	-79	-1.4	0
Career		655	1,246	52.6	9,216	7.4	64	57	122.5	230	-338	-1.5	6

== Career highlights ==
=== Awards and honors ===
- World Bowl champion (1999)
- Pro Bowl (2005)
- NFC champion (2003)
- NFC Offensive Player of the Week (Week 4, 2008)
- Carolina Panthers Hall of Honor
- Lead the league in 4th quarter comebacks (5) and game-winning drives (8) in 2003
- Tied for the most 4th quarter comebacks (4) in 2008
- Lead the league yards per completed pass (13.4) in 2008

=== Records ===
==== NFL records ====
- Longest completed pass in Super Bowl history (85-yard touchdown to Muhsin Muhammad in Super Bowl XXXVIII)

==== Panthers franchise records ====
- Most career 4th quarter comeback wins (17)
- Most career game-winning drives (23)
- Most 4th quarter comeback wins (5) in a single season (2003)
- Most game-winning drives (7) in single season (2003)

== Personal life ==
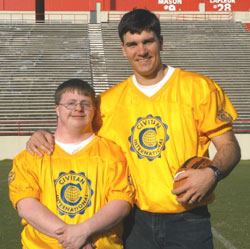
Delhomme (right) and his cousin Kevin Melancon promoting the work of Civitan clubs with developmentally disabled people.

Delhomme married Keri Melancon in 2000; the two were childhood sweethearts, and were "Junior Sweethearts" at Teurlings Catholic. They have two daughters: Lauren Elizabeth, who was born on December 17, 2001, and Lindsey Marie, who was born on February 25, 2007. The Delhommes are devout Catholics. Delhomme wears #17 because it is the date of his first daughter's birthday, and she was born after 17 hours of labor. He and his family are Panthers fans.

Delhomme has garnered popularity as a pitch-man for the fast food restaurant Bojangles', where he is often depicted as a single-minded fried-chicken addict who audibles Bojangles' "fixin's" at the line of scrimmage. One commercial parodies the film Jerry Maguire and the line "Show me the money!"; former teammate with the Panthers Steve Smith is featured in a cameo. Another commercial with Smith portrays the duo as the Dukes of Hazzard, driving the General Lee with a large chicken head on the roof. Delhomme has also done SunCom Wireless limited edition cell phone commercials that feature a Panthers logo and his signature, and he has appeared in public service announcements for Civitan International. Delhomme is noted for licking his fingers before every play, and sticking his tongue out as part of his focus.

The official Panthers website featured a regular discussion with Delhomme during the regular season, known as "Cajun Up with Jake".

Since retiring from football in 2011, Delhomme returned to his hometown of Breaux Bridge, Louisiana, and worked in banking while also breeding racehorses. His best, a mare named Forest Lake who won several stakes races, retired in 2017 and was sent to be bred in Kentucky. Another, Touchuponastar, is trained by his brother Jeff Delhomme and has earned nearly $1.7 million as of December 2025.

On July 9, 2019, the Panthers announced that Delhomme would be inducted into the team's Hall of Honor along with Jordan Gross, Wesley Walls, and Steve Smith Sr. On August 14, 2019, he was named to the Panthers' radio team as a color analyst.
