= Todd Doxzon =

American football player (born 1975)

No. 45, 17, 15, 7
- Positions: Wide receiver, quarterback

Personal information
- Born: March 28, 1975 (age 51); Sioux City, Iowa, U.S.
- Listed height: 6 ft 1 in (1.85 m)
- Listed weight: 186 lb (84 kg)

Career information
- High school: Millard North (Omaha, Nebraska)
- College: Iowa State (1993–1996)
- NFL draft: 1997: undrafted

Career history
- New York Jets (1997)*; New England Patriots (1998)*; → Amsterdam Admirals (1998); Miami Dolphins (1998); → Amsterdam Admirals (1999); Miami Dolphins (2000)*; Los Angeles Xtreme (2001); New York Dragons (2001–2003); Carolina Cobras (2004); Georgia Force (2005); New York Dragons (2005)
- * Offseason or practice squad member only
- Stats at Pro Football Reference
- Stats at ArenaFan.com

Todd Matthew Doxzon (born March 28, 1975) is an American former professional football player who was a wide receiver for the Miami Dolphins of the National Football League (NFL). He played college football at Iowa State University as an option quarterback. He signed with the New York Jets as a receiver after going undrafted in the 1997 NFL draft, but was released before the start of the season. Doxzon played special teams, quarterback, and wide receiver for the Dolphins during the 1998 season. He spent the remainder of his pro career as a receiver in NFL Europe, the XFL, and the Arena Football League (AFL).

== Early life ==
Todd Matthew Doxzon was born on March 28, 1975, in Sioux City, Iowa. He played football and baseball at Millard North High School in Omaha, Nebraska, earning all-state honors in both sports. He was a quarterback in high school. Doxson was inducted into Millard North High's athletics hall of fame in 2019.

== College career ==
Doxzon was a four-year letterman at quarterback for the Iowa State Cyclones of Iowa State University from 1993 to 1996. He was an option quarterback at Iowa State. He started three games as a true freshman in 1993, completing 11 of 22 passes (50.0%) for 185 yards, two touchdowns, and one interception while also rushing for 327 yards and three touchdowns. In November 1993, Doxzon was listed as the joint-number one quarterback on the depth chart with Bob Utter. Doxzon started nine games in 1994 but missed several due to injury; he recorded 51 completions on 90 passing attempts (56.7%) for 745 yards, three touchdowns, and three interceptions, and 375 rushing yards and four rushing touchdowns. In 1995, Doxzon completed 58 of 100 passes (58.0%) for 730 yards, four touchdowns, and four interceptions while rushing for 120 yards and three touchdowns. He missed part of the 1995 season due to ankle problems. As an offensive co-captain with Troy Davis his senior year in 1996, Doxzon completed 124 of 231 passes (53.7%) for 1,498 yards, 12 touchdowns, and nine interceptions while also rushing for 223 yards and four touchdowns. He was the first Iowa State quarterback since 1986 to throw for at least ten touchdowns in a season. He graduated from Iowa State with a degree in marketing.

== Professional career ==
Prior to the 1997 NFL draft, Doxson ran a 4.47 second 40-yard dash. After going undrafted, he signed with the New York Jets on April 21, 1997. Doxson signed with the Jets while he was in Cuernavaca, Mexico, studying Spanish. He converted to wide receiver while with the Jets, but was waived on August 18, 1997.

Doxzon signed with the New England Patriots on February 13, 1998. He was allocated to NFL Europe to play for the Amsterdam Admirals. He played in four games during the 1998 NFL Europe season, catching eight passes for 135 yards and two touchdowns. Doxzon was then released by the Patriots on August 19, 1998.

Doxzon was signed to the practice squad of the Miami Dolphins on October 7, 1998. On October 14, he was promoted to the active roster as a quarterback/wide receiver. He played in nine games for the Dolphins during the 1998 season, mostly on special teams. He was also used in short-yardage situations at quarterback, rushing twice for six yards and two first downs. He was targeted once at receiver but did not record a reception. Doxzon was allocated to NFL Europe again in 1999. He appeared in five games for the Amsterdam Admirals during the 1999 season and spent part of the year on injured reserve, catching eight passes for 145 yards and one touchdown while also returning three kickoffs for 57 yards. He had foot surgery in June 1999. Doxzon was waived by the Dolphins on July 28, 1999, after failing a physical. He signed with Miami again on February 16, 2000, but was later released on July 7, 2000.

Doxzon was selected by the Los Angeles Xtreme of the XFL in the 20th round, with the 160th overall pick, of the 2001 draft. He played in one game for the Xtreme during the 2001 XFL season before being waived on March 7, 2001.

Doxzon signed with the New York Dragons of the Arena Football League (AFL) on March 27, 2001. He was placed on injured reserve on June 7 and activated on June 22. Overall, he played in 11 games for the Dragons during the 2001 AFL season, totaling 52 receptions for 642 yards and 21 touchdowns, 16 solo tackles, 11 assisted tackles, three pass breakups, and one interception that he returned for a touchdown. The Dragons lost in the first round of the playoffs to the Toronto Phantoms by a score of 64–57. He spent part of his AFL career on defense due to the league's ironman rules. Doxzon was also an offensive specialist for some of his AFL career. He re-signed with New York on January 9, 2002. He was placed on the refused to report list on March 24, but was later moved back to the active roster on March 29, 2002. Doxzon appeared in 12 games, starting one, in 2002, catching 39 passes for 624 yards and 14 touchdowns while also posting 12 solo tackles and four assisted tackles. He re-signed with the Dragons again on January 26, 2003. He was placed on injured reserve on February 28 and was activated on April 17, 2003. Overall, he played in seven games, starting one, during the 2003 season and caught 13 passes for 206 yards and six touchdowns.

On November 3, 2003, Doxzon signed with the Carolina Cobras of the AFL. He appeared in 14 games for the Cobras during the 2004 season and recorded a career-high 94 receptions for 1,142 yards and 23 touchdowns.

Doxzon was signed by the AFL's Georgia Force on October 28, 2004. He was placed on injured reserve and was later activated on February 10, 2005. He played in two games for the Force, catching six passes for 55 yards and one touchdown, before being released on April 6, 2005.

Doxzon then played in one game for the Dragons in 2005, catching four passes for 50 yards and one touchdown.

== Personal life ==
Doxzon has worked as a personal trainer, construction worker, and delivery man. He also later became a church pastor. He trained with Kurt Warner during the offseasons as they were both from Iowa and were teammates on the 1998 Amsterdam Admirals. Doxzon is listed on Warner's Pro Football Hall of Fame appreciation page.
