= 1998 Barcelona Dragons season =

NFL Europe team season

1998 Barcelona Dragons (NFL Europe) season
- General manager: Marco Fusté
- Head coach: Jack Bicknell
- Home stadium: Estadi Olímpic de Montjuïc

Results
- Record: 4–6
- Division place: 4th
- Playoffs: Did not qualify

The 1998 Barcelona Dragons season was the sixth season for the franchise in the NFL Europe League (NFLEL). The team was led by head coach Jack Bicknell in his sixth year, and played its home games at Estadi Olímpic de Montjuïc in Barcelona, Catalonia, Spain. They finished the regular season in fourth place with a record of four wins and six losses.

== Personnel ==
=== Staff ===
1998 Barcelona Dragons (NFL Europe) staff
Front office: President – Miguel Matas; General Manager – Marco Fusté; Head coaches: Head Coach – Jack Bicknell; Offensive coaches: Offensive Coordinator/Offensive Line – Vince Martino; Quarterbacks/Wide Receivers – Peter Vaas; National Coach/Running Backs – Juan Jiménez	Defensive coaches: Defensive Coordinator/Linebackers – Red Kelin; Defensive Line – Sam Clancy; Defensive Backs – Chip Beake

=== Roster ===
1998 Barcelona Dragons final roster
Quarterbacks: 11 Jason Davis; 15 Jason Martin; 7 James Ritchey; Running backs: 40 Reggie Brooks; 21 Earnest Hunter; Wide receivers: 87 Kotto Cotton; 88 Anthony Ladd; 81 Isaiah Mustafa; 81 Curtis Shearer; Tight ends: 86 Grant Baynham; 85 Bill Khayat	Offensive linemen: 68 Gary Brown T; 74 Tom Claro T; 70 Joel Davis G; 77 Matt Lepsis T; 78 Emerson Martin C; 64 Dave Rilatt G; 62 Tom Robsock G; 55 Joey Wylie G/C; Defensive linemen: 92 Hugh Hunter DE; 91 Larry Jackson DE; 97 Corey Mayfield DE; 93 Brandon Noble DT; 94 Josh Taves DT; 72 Devin Wyman DT	Linebackers: 99 Joe Cummings OLB; 50 Anthony Hicks OLB; 59 Juan Long MLB; 52 Shay Muirbrook MLB; Defensive backs: 30 Carlos Brooks S; 25 Dante DePaolo S; 29 Anthony Fogle CB; 28 George McCullough CB; 23 Tristan Moss CB; 46 Armon Williams S; 20 Mike Wright CB; Special teams: 10 Jeff Beckley P	National players: 14 (Spain) Jesús Angoy K; 8 (Spain) Rafa Garcia K; 66 (Spain) Ivan Imbernon DE; 36 (France) Gregoire Malo S; 39 (Mexico) Arturo Martinez RB; 1 (Mexico) Marco Martos WR; 12 (Spain) Dani Pegenaute QB; 84 (Mexico) Carlos Rosado WR; Rookies in italics

== Schedule ==
Week	Date	Kickoff (Note: All times local to where the game was played.)	Opponent	Results		Game site	Attendance
Week	Date	Kickoff	Opponent	Final score	Team record	Game site	Attendance
1	Sunday, April 5	8:00 p.m.	Scottish Claymores	W 19–18	1–0	Estadi Olímpic de Montjuïc	10,500
2	Saturday, April 11	7:00 p.m.	at Frankfurt Galaxy	W 15–7	2–0	Waldstadion	28,215
3	Saturday, April 18	6:00 p.m.	Amsterdem Admirals	L 28–41	2–1	Estadi Olímpic de Montjuïc	11,800
4	Saturday, April 25	7:00 p.m.	at Rhein Fire	L 9–13	2–2	Rheinstadion	22,249
5	Sunday, May 3	3:00 p.m.	at Scottish Claymores	L 10–30	2–3		9,629
6	Sunday, May 10	8:00 p.m.	Frankfurt Galaxy	W 31–2	3–3	Estadi Olímpic de Montjuïc	6,800
7	Saturday, May 16	8:00 p.m.	Rhein Fire	W 31–24	4–3	Estadi Olímpic de Montjuïc	7,900
8	Saturday, May 23	7:00 p.m.	at Amsterdem Admirals	L 17–20	4–4	Amsterdam ArenA	12,864
9	Sunday, May 31	3:00 p.m.	at England Monarchs	L 5–17	4–5		5,215
10	Sunday, June 7	8:00 p.m.	England Monarchs	L 20–28	4–6	Estadi Olímpic de Montjuïc	10,834

== Standings ==
NFL Europe League
Team	W	L	T	PCT	PF	PA	Home	Road	STK
Frankfurt Galaxy	7	3	0	.700	177	163	3–2	4–1	W4
Rhein Fire	7	3	0	.700	198	142	4–1	3–2	L2
Amsterdam Admirals	7	3	0	.700	205	174	4–1	3–2	W3
Barcelona Dragons	4	6	0	.400	185	200	3–2	1–4	L3
England Monarchs	3	7	0	.300	158	205	2–3	1–4	W2
Scottish Claymores	2	8	0	.200	153	192	2–3	0–5	L3
