= 1998 Rhein Fire season =

NFL Europe team season

- General manager: Alexander Leibkind
- Head coach: Galen Hall
- Home stadium: Rheinstadion

Results
- Record: 7–3
- Division place: 2nd
- Playoffs: World Bowl '98 champion

The 1998 Rhein Fire season was the fourth season for the franchise in the NFL Europe League (NFLEL). The team was led by head coach Galen Hall in his fourth year, and played its home games at Rheinstadion in Düsseldorf, Germany. They finished the regular season in second place with a record of seven wins and three losses. Rhein won the first championship in team history by defeating the Frankfurt Galaxy 34–10 in World Bowl '98.

== Personnel ==
=== Staff ===
1998 Rhein Fire staff
| Front office: General Manager – Alexander Leibkind; Head coaches: Head Coach/Running Backs – Galen Hall; Offensive coaches: Offensive Coordinator/Quarterbacks – Ken Karcher; Wide Receivers – Mike Jones; Offensive Line – Whitey Jordan | Defensive coaches: Defensive Coordinator/Linebackers – Pete Kuharchek; National Coach/Defensive Line – Walter Rohlfing; Defensive Backs/Special Teams – Steve Carson |

=== Roster ===
1998 Rhein Fire final roster
| Quarterbacks: 14 Jim Arellanes; 11 Mike Quinn; Running backs: 43 Derrick Clark; 26 Jon Vaughn; Wide receivers: 86 Dialleo Burks; 87 Kevin Lee; 88 Marcus Robinson; 80 Larry Ryans; Tight ends: 89 Harold Bishop; 81 Hayward Clay | Offensive linemen: 66 Chad Bates G; 78 Ron Florine T (IR); 55 Bob Kronenberg G/C; 60 Garin Patrick C; 64 Leslie Ratliffe T; 73 Derek West T; 61 Randy Wheeler G; 68 Dennis Whitmore T; Defensive linemen: 93 Duane Ashman DT; 51 Mike Croel DE; 91 Elliott Fortune DT; 75 Ed Philion DT; 92 Shatony Sargent DE; 74 Walter Scott DT; 90 Israel Stanley DE | Linebackers: 53 Jamie Baisley OLB; 58 Vince Bradford OLB; 56 Mark Brook MLB; 57 Kevin Jefferson MLB; 52 Wardell Rouse OLB; Defensive backs: 36 Robert Davis S; 23 Tim Denton CB; 46 Joe Gordon CB; 35 Richard Jones CB; 27 Kerry Joseph S; 30 Chris Shelling S; Special teams: 13 Nate Cochran P; 2 Danny Kight K | National players: 10 (Germany) Manfred Burgsmüller K; 82 (Germany) Martin Driever TE; 50 (Germany) Anthony Doghmi OLB; 98 (Germany) Ole Meine DE; 8 (Germany) Babak Movassaghi WR; 21 (Japan) Tamon Nakamura RB; Rookies in italics |

== Schedule ==
| Week | Date | Kickoff (Note: All times local to where the game was played.) | Opponent | Results | | Game site | Attendance |
| Week | Date | Kickoff | Opponent | Final score | Team record | Game site | Attendance |
|---|---|---|---|---|---|---|---|
| 1 | Saturday, April 4 | 7:00 p.m. | Amsterdam Admirals | W 16–13 | 1–0 | Rheinstadion | 22,102 |
| 2 | Saturday, April 11 | 7:00 p.m. | at England Monarchs | W 31–7 | 2–0 | Ashton Gate Stadium | 5,523 |
| 3 | Sunday, April 19 | 3:00 p.m. | at Scottish Claymores | W 20–10 | 3–0 | Murrayfield Stadium | 8,452 |
| 4 | Saturday, April 25 | 7:00 p.m. | Barcelona Dragons | W 13–9 | 4–0 | Rheinstadion | 22,249 |
| 5 | Saturday, May 2 | 7:00 p.m. | at Frankfurt Galaxy | W 31–14 | 5–0 | Waldstadion | 41,123 |
| 6 | Saturday, May 9 | 7:00 p.m. | Scottish Claymores | W 17–10 | 6–0 | Rheinstadion | 20,480 |
| 7 | Saturday, May 16 | 7:00 p.m. | at Barcelona Dragons | L 24–31 | 6–1 | Estadi Olímpic de Montjuïc | 7,900 |
| 8 | Saturday, May 23 | 7:00 p.m. | England Monarchs | W 12–7 | 7–1 | Rheinstadion | 21,288 |
| 9 | Saturday, May 30 | 7:00 p.m. | at Amsterdam Admirals | L 17–21 | 7–2 | Amsterdam ArenA | 17,588 |
| 10 | Saturday, June 6 | 7:00 p.m. | Frankfurt Galaxy | L 17–20 ^{OT} | 7–3 | Rheinstadion | 41,212 |
World Bowl '98
| 11 | Sunday, June 14 | 7:00 p.m. | Frankfurt Galaxy | W 34–10 | 8–3 | Waldstadion | 47,846 |

== Standings ==
NFL Europe League
| Team | W | L | T | PCT | PF | PA | Home | Road | STK |
|---|---|---|---|---|---|---|---|---|---|
| Frankfurt Galaxy | 7 | 3 | 0 | .700 | 177 | 163 | 3–2 | 4–1 | W4 |
| Rhein Fire | 7 | 3 | 0 | .700 | 198 | 142 | 4–1 | 3–2 | L2 |
| Amsterdam Admirals | 7 | 3 | 0 | .700 | 205 | 174 | 4–1 | 3–2 | W3 |
| Barcelona Dragons | 4 | 6 | 0 | .400 | 185 | 200 | 3–2 | 1–4 | L3 |
| England Monarchs | 3 | 7 | 0 | .300 | 158 | 205 | 2–3 | 1–4 | W2 |
| Scottish Claymores | 2 | 8 | 0 | .200 | 153 | 192 | 2–3 | 0–5 | L3 |

== Game summaries ==
=== Week 1: vs Amsterdam Admirals ===
Week One: Amsterdam Admirals at Rhein Fire – Game summary

| Quarter | 1 | 2 | 3 | 4 | Total |
|---|---|---|---|---|---|
| Amsterdam | 3 | 10 | 0 | 0 | 13 |
| Rhein | 0 | 7 | 6 | 3 | 16 |

at Rheinstadion, Düsseldorf, Germany

- Date: Saturday, April 4
- Game time: 7:00 p.m. CEST
- Game attendance: 22,102

=== Week 2: at England Monarchs ===
Week Two: Rhein Fire at England Monarchs – Game summary

| Quarter | 1 | 2 | 3 | 4 | Total |
|---|---|---|---|---|---|
| Rhein | 10 | 14 | 7 | 0 | 31 |
| England | 0 | 7 | 0 | 0 | 7 |

at Ashton Gate Stadium, Bristol, United Kingdom

- Date: Saturday, April 11
- Game time: 7:00 p.m. BST
- Game attendance: 5,523

=== Week 3: at Scottish Claymores ===
Week Three: Rhein Fire at Scottish Claymores – Game summary

| Quarter | 1 | 2 | 3 | 4 | Total |
|---|---|---|---|---|---|
| Rhein | 0 | 17 | 0 | 3 | 20 |
| Scotland | 0 | 7 | 0 | 3 | 10 |

- Date: Sunday, April 19
- Game time: 3:00 p.m. BST
- Game attendance: 8,249

=== Week 5: at Frankfurt Galaxy ===
Week Five: Rhein Fire at Frankfurt Galaxy – Game summary

| Quarter | 1 | 2 | 3 | 4 | Total |
|---|---|---|---|---|---|
| Rhein | 3 | 7 | 14 | 7 | 31 |
| Frankfurt | 0 | 0 | 0 | 14 | 14 |

at Waldstadion, Frankfurt, Germany

- Date: Saturday, May 2
- Game time: 7:00 p.m. CEST
- Game attendance: 41,123
- Referee: Tony Corrente

Game information

First quarter

- Rhein – 28-yard field goal by Manfred Burgsmüller, 6:06.

Second quarter

- Rhein – Marcus Robinson 58-yard touchdown reception from Mike Quinn, Manfred Burgsmüller kick good, 1:45.

Third quarter

- Rhein – Derrick Clark 1-yard touchdown run, Manfred Burgsmüller kick good, 6:08.
- Rhein – Derrick Clark 1-yard touchdown run, Manfred Burgsmüller kick good, 0:46.

Fourth quarter

- Frankfurt – Mario Bailey 7-yard touchdown reception from Damon Huard, Ralf Kleinmann kick good, 9:30.
- Rhein – Derrick Clark 3-yard touchdown run, Manfred Burgsmüller kick good, 4:59.
- Frankfurt – Mario Bailey 22-yard touchdown reception from Chris Dittoe, Ralf Kleinmann kick good, 0:02.

=== Week 7: at Barcelona Dragons ===
Week Seven: Rhein Fire at Barcelona Dragons – Game summary

| Quarter | 1 | 2 | 3 | 4 | Total |
|---|---|---|---|---|---|
| Rhein | 0 | 3 | 7 | 14 | 24 |
| Barcelona | 7 | 14 | 0 | 10 | 31 |

at Estadi Olímpic de Montjuïc, Barcelona, Spain

- Date: Saturday, May 16
- Game time: 7:00 p.m. CEST
