= 1998 England Monarchs season =

NFL Europe team season

- General manager: Alton Byrd
- Head coach: Lionel Taylor
- Home stadium: Crystal Palace; Ashton Gate; Alexander Stadium

Results
- Record: 3–7
- Division place: 5th
- Playoffs: Did not qualify

The 1998 England Monarchs season was the sixth and final year of competition for the franchise in the NFL Europe League (NFLEL). The team was led by head coach Lionel Taylor in his third year, and played its home games at three different stadia across England — Crystal Palace in south London, Ashton Gate in Bristol, and Alexander Stadium in Birmingham. They finished the regular season in fifth place with a record of three wins and seven losses.

== Schedule ==
Week	Date	Opponent	Result	Record	Venue	Attendance	Recap
1	April 5	Frankfurt Galaxy	L 13–36	0–1	Crystal Palace National Sports Centre	5,225	Recap
2	April 11	Rhein Fire	L 7–31	0–2	Ashton Gate Stadium	5,523	Recap
3	April 19	at Frankfurt Galaxy	L 17–23 (OT)	0–3	Waldstadion	11,942	Recap
4	April 26	Scottish Claymores	W 14–10	1–3	Alexander Stadium	5,768	Recap
5	May 2	at Amsterdam Admirals	L 17–24	1–4	Amsterdam ArenA	20,651	Recap
6	May 10	Amsterdam Admirals	L 7–16	1–5	Crystal Palace National Sports Centre	9,384	Recap
7	May 17	at Scottish Claymores	L 24–27	1–6	Murrayfield Stadium	11,714	Recap
8	May 23	at Rhein Fire	L 7–12	1–7	Rheinstadion	21,288	Recap
9	May 31	Barcelona Dragons	W 17–5	2–7	Crystal Palace National Sports Centre	5,215	Recap
10	June 7	at Barcelona Dragons	W 28–20	3–7	Estadi Olímpic de Montjuïc	10,834	Recap

== Personnel ==
=== Staff ===
1998 England Monarchs staff
Front office: General Manager – Alton Byrd; Head coaches: Head Coach – Lionel Taylor; Offensive coaches: Offensive Coordinator/Offensive Line – Rod Humenuik; National Coach/Running Backs – Tony Allen	Defensive coaches: Defensive Coordinator/Linebackers – Dennis Danielson; Defensive Line – Jim Tomsula; Defensive Backs – Sam Jenkins; Special teams coaches: Special Teams – Jim Daigle

=== Roster ===
1998 England Monarchs final roster
Quarterbacks: 9 Josh LaRocca; 12 Ryan Perry-Smith; 14 Wally Richardson; Running backs: 44 Obafemi Ayanbadejo; 24 Tyrone Edwards; 32 Oscar Gray; 33 Shon Mitchell (IR); 1 Bobby Phillips; 23 Charles Talley (IR); Wide receivers: 10 Alan Allen; 81 Reggie Jones; 84 Toderick Malone; 11 Shawn Turner; Tight ends: 80 Jerod Fiebiger (IR); 82 Sean Manuel	Offensive linemen: 70 Jason Augustino G; 60 Greg Bloedorn C; 77 Cayetano Castro G (IR); 72 Robert Couch T; 74 Seth Dittman T; 67 Fritz Fequiere G; 78 Chris Oltmanns G; 63 Craig Warren T; Defensive linemen: 75 Carlos Fowler DE; 91 Uhuru Hamiter DE; 76 Emile Palmer DT; 99 Larry Townsend DT; 96 Ben Williams DT	Linebackers: 58 Dana Cottrell OLB; 56 Scott Fields OLB; 54 Randy Neal OLB; 94 Richard Newbill MLB; Defensive backs: 28 Kenny Bailey CB; 20 Duane Butler S; 25 Keita Crespina CB; 22 George Harris S; 30 Hudfaifa Ismaeli CB; 26 Anthony Rice CB; 27 Darren Studstill S; 39 Tony Watkins S; Special teams: 18 Brian Greenfield P; 5 Don Silvestri K	National players: 52 (England) Karl Ballard MLB; 21 (England) Rowelle Blenman WR; 66 (England) Lewis Capes DE; 8 (England) Rob Hart K; 2 (England) Francis Hatega S; 64 (England) Tony MacKenzie G (IR); 29 (England) Victor Muhammad RB; 91 (England) Tom Tovo DT; Rookies in italics

== Standings ==
NFL Europe League
Team	W	L	T	PCT	PF	PA	Home	Road	STK
Frankfurt Galaxy	7	3	0	.700	177	163	3–2	4–1	W4
Rhein Fire	7	3	0	.700	198	142	4–1	3–2	L2
Amsterdam Admirals	7	3	0	.700	205	174	4–1	3–2	W3
Barcelona Dragons	4	6	0	.400	185	200	3–2	1–4	L3
England Monarchs	3	7	0	.300	158	205	2–3	1–4	W2
Scottish Claymores	2	8	0	.200	153	192	2–3	0–5	L3
