= 1994 All-Independent Football Alliance football team =

American college football season

The 1994 All-Independent football Alliance Team consists of American football players chosen by the Associated Press for their All-IFA teams for the 1994 NCAA Division I-A football season.

== Offense ==
=== Quarterbacks ===
- Marcus Crandell, East Carolina (AP-1)
- Marty Lowe, ULM (AP-2)

=== Running backs ===
- Junior Smith, East Carolina (AP-1)
- Anthony Shelmon, Louisville (AP-1)
- Mitchell Galloway, East Carolina (AP-2)

=== Wide receivers ===
- Stepfret Williams, ULM (AP-1)
- Mark Montgomery, Southern Miss (AP-1)
- Wilbert Ursin, ULL (AP-2)
- Melvin Ferdinand, Tulane (AP-2)

=== Tight ends ===
- Marcus Pope, Southern Miss (AP-2)

=== Offensive tackles ===
- Roman Oben, Louisville (AP-1)
- Keith Setler, Memphis (AP-2)

=== Offensive guards ===
- Matt Vaupel, Cincinnati (AP-1)
- Terry Tilgheman, East Carolina (AP-1)
- Brent Duggins, Southern Miss (AP-2)

=== Centers ===
- David Milwee, Southern Miss (AP-1)
- John Barbee, ULM (AP-2)

== Defense ==
=== Defensive linemen ===
- Robert Brown, Southern Miss (AP-1)
- Michael Tobias, Southern Miss (AP-1)
- Shawn King, ULM (AP-1)
- Keith Cook, Tulane (AP-2)
- John Krawczyk, East Carolina (AP-2)
- Bryan Bennett, Memphis (AP-2)

=== Linebackers ===
- Eugene Harmon, Southern Miss (AP-1)
- Mark Libiano, East Carolina (AP-1)
- Jesse Allen, Memphis (AP-1)
- Damon Poage, ULM (AP-2)

=== Defensive backs ===
- Conrad Clarks, ULM (AP-1)
- Derrick Hervey, Southern Miss (AP-1)
- Mike Staid, Tulane (AP-1)
- L.T. Gulley, Southern Miss (AP-2)
