= Mitchell Galloway =

American football player (born 1974)

No. 82
- Positions: Wide receiver, Return specialist

Personal information
- Born: October 8, 1974 (age 52); Chesterfield County, South Carolina, U.S.
- Listed height: 5 ft 8 in (1.73 m)
- Listed weight: 178 lb (81 kg)

Career information
- High school: Marlboro County (Bennettsville, South Carolina)
- College: East Carolina (1993–1996)
- NFL draft: 1997: undrafted

Career history
- Buffalo Bills (1997–1998); → Frankfurt Galaxy (1998); Hamilton Tiger-Cats (1999)*; Memphis Maniax (2001)*
- * Offseason or practice squad member only

Awards and highlights
- Second-team All-Independent Football Alliance (1994)

Career NFL statistics
- Games played: 3
- Return yards: 145
- Stats at Pro Football Reference
- Stats at CFL.ca

Mitchell Galloway (born October 8, 1974) is an American former professional football wide receiver and return specialist who played for the Buffalo Bills of the National Football League (NFL). He played college football for the East Carolina Pirates.

== Early life ==
Galloway was born on October 8, 1974, in Chesterfield County, South Carolina. He attended Marlboro County High School in Bennettsville, South Carolina.

== College career ==
Galloway played college football for the East Carolina Pirates from 1992 to 1996 and was a four-year letterman from 1993 to 1996. He played in 41 games at running back and wide receiver, catching 131 passes for 1,754 yards and nine touchdowns. Galloway also rushed for 59 yards and two touchdowns with 1,438 kick return yards and one touchdown.

== Professional career ==
=== Buffalo Bills ===
After going unselected in the 1997 NFL draft, Galloway signed with the Buffalo Bills as an undrafted free agent. On August 24 he was released and signed to the practice squad on August 26. On September 20, Galloway was elevated to the active roster and made his debut the following day against the Indianapolis Colts, returning four kicks for 100 yards, two punt returns for 15 yards and muffed one punt. On September 22, he reverted to the practice squad. On October 4, Galloway was released by the team but re-signed to the practice squad on October 7. On December 12, he was elevated again to the active roster. Galloway played in two more games, returning two kicks for 30 yards. On August 24, 1998, he was released by the Bills.

=== Frankfurt Galaxy ===
On February 18, 1998, Galloway was allocated to the Frankfurt Galaxy of NFL Europe. He had 23 receptions for 285 yards and three touchdowns with 345 kick return yards.

=== Hamilton Tiger-Cats ===
On April 8, 1999, Galloway signed with the Hamilton Tiger-Cats of the Canadian Football League (CFL). On June 26, he was released by the team.

=== Carolina Cobras ===
On December 17, 1999, Galloway was signed by the Carolina Cobras of the Arena Football League (AFL). On April 10, 2000, he was released by the team.

=== Memphis Maniax ===
Galloway was selected by the Memphis Maniax with the 459th overall pick in the 59th round of the 2001 XFL draft of the newly formed, XFL. He was released before playing a game for the team.
