= Emerson Martin =

American football player (born 1970)

No. 78
- Position: Guard

Personal information
- Born: May 6, 1970 (age 56); Elizabethtown, North Carolina, U.S.
- Listed height: 6 ft 4 in (1.93 m)
- Listed weight: 302 lb (137 kg)

Career information
- College: Hampton
- NFL draft: 1993: undrafted

Career history
- Kansas City Chiefs (1994)*; Carolina Panthers (1995); Pittsburgh Steelers (1995–1996)*; Barcelona Dragons (1997); Pittsburgh Steelers (1997)*; Albany Firebirds (1998); Barcelona Dragons (1998); Pittsburgh Steelers (1998)*; New England Sea Wolves (1999); Carolina Cobras (2000)
- * Offseason or practice squad member only

Career NFL statistics
- Games: 2
- Games Started: 1
- Stats at Pro Football Reference

Emerson Floyd Martin (born May 6, 1970) is a retired American football player who played two games with the Carolina Panthers of the National Football League (NFL) during the team's expansion year of 1995.

Martin was signed by the Panthers in January 1995. Martin played at guard for two games in 1995, earning one start. He was released in October 1995. Martin later played with the Mobile Admirals in the short-lived Regional Football League in 1999.

After ending his football career, Martin shifted to coaching, starting with the AFL Carolina Cobras. He transitioned to college football, where he gained recognition for mentoring both offensive and defensive linemen. As a coach Martin is keen on finding athletes whom he can nurture into future stars, while also fostering ties with alumni, supporters, and families. Many top college programs scout talent from Emerson's Players 2 Pros, LLC program. He has successfully positioned numerous players in Division 1 (FBS), Division 1 (FCS), and Division II schools.

Before facing scrutiny for recruiting allegations, Martin established a respected program at Village Christian Academy in Fayetteville, North Carolina, where he led the team to consecutive state championship appearances within just two years. Subsequently, he stepped down as Head Football Coach, eventually taking up a role with the Indianapolis Colts as a Bill Walsh Intern.

Coaching experience

- 2000–2002 AFL Carolina Cobras (OL)
- 2002–2003 East Bladen High School (OL/DL)
- 2003–2005 Saint Augustine University (OL)
- 2011–2019 CEO, Players 2 Pros, LLC
- 2013–2014 Athens Drive High School (OL)
- 2017–2019 Village Christian Academy (HFC)
- 2019 Indianapolis Colts – Bill Walsh Intern
- 2020 Indianapolis Colts – Bill Walsh Intern
- 2020–2021 Juniata College (OC/OL)
- 2022–2024 USFL Pittsburgh Maulers (OL)
- 2024–Present Warner University (OL)

National Football League (NFL) offensive lineman

- 1995–1999 Pittsburgh Steelers
- 1997–1998 – NFL Europe Pittsburgh Steelers (Linemen of the Year)
- 1995 – Carolina Panthers
- 1994 – Kansas City Chiefs

Achievements

- All CIAA first-team 1992, 1993
- Black College All-American 1992, 1993
- Little College All-American 1992, 1993
- Associated Press Division II All-American 1992, 1993
- Kodak All-American 1993
- NFL Coaching Intern Programs
