= Tim Denton =

American football player (born 1973)

No. 23, 25, 22, 38
- Position: Cornerback

Personal information
- Born: February 2, 1973 (age 53); Galveston, Texas, U.S.
- Listed height: 5 ft 11 in (1.80 m)
- Listed weight: 182 lb (83 kg)

Career information
- High school: Ball (Galveston)
- College: Oklahoma; Sam Houston State
- NFL draft: 1996: undrafted

Career history
- Atlanta Falcons (1996–1997)*; Rhein Fire (1998); Washington Redskins (1998–1999); San Diego Chargers (2000); Dallas Desperados (2002–2003)
- * Offseason or practice squad member only

Career NFL statistics
- Tackles: 32
- Passes defended: 4
- Stats at Pro Football Reference

Career AFL statistics
- Tackles: 92
- Interceptions: 5
- Passes defended: 17
- Stats at ArenaFan.com

Timothy Jerome Denton Sr. (born February 2, 1973) is an American former professional football player who was a defensive back in the National Football League (NFL). He was born in Galveston, Texas, and played college football for the Oklahoma Sooners and Sam Houston State Bearkats. He played for the Washington Redskins in 1998 and 1999, and the San Diego Chargers in 2000.
