= Jerry Reese (wide receiver) =

American football player (born 1973)

No. 81
- Position: Wide receiver

Personal information
- Born: March 18, 1973 (age 53); Berkeley, California, U.S.
- Listed height: 5 ft 11 in (1.80 m)
- Listed weight: 190 lb (86 kg)

Career information
- High school: Mount Diablo (Concord, California)
- College: San Jose State (1991–1994)

Career history
- San Jose SaberCats (1995–1996); Buffalo Bills (1997); Scottish Claymores (1998); San Jose SaberCats (1999–2004)

Career statistics
- Games played: 5
- Stats at Pro Football Reference

Jerry Maurice Reese (born March 18, 1973) is an American former professional football player who played wide receiver for the Buffalo Bills of the National Football League (NFL). He played college football for the San Jose State Spartans. He also played in the Arena Football League for the San Jose SaberCats.
