= Dana Cottrell =

American football player (born 1974)

No. 58, 45
- Position: Linebacker

Personal information
- Born: January 11, 1974 (age 52); Boston, Massachusetts, U.S.
- Listed height: 6 ft 3 in (1.91 m)
- Listed weight: 234 lb (106 kg)

Career information
- High school: Billerica Memorial (Billerica, Massachusetts)
- College: Syracuse (1993–1996)
- NFL draft: 1997: undrafted

Career history
- Cincinnati Bengals (1997)*; Jacksonville Jaguars (1997)*; New England Patriots (1998–1999); → England Monarchs (1998)
- * Offseason or practice squad member only

Career NFL statistics
- Games played: 3
- Stats at Pro Football Reference

Dana Robert Cottrell (born January 11, 1974) is an American former professional football linebacker who played in the National Football League (NFL) for the Cincinnati Bengals, Jacksonville Jaguars and New England Patriots. He played college football for the Syracuse Orange. Cottrell also played for the England Monarchs in NFL Europe.

== Early life ==
Cottrell was born on January 11, 1974, in Boston, Massachusetts. He attended Billerica Memorial High School in Billerica, Massachusetts.

== College career ==
Cottrell played college football for the Syracuse Orangemen from 1993 to 1996 and was a four-year letterman. He had one interception for 11 yards in 1995.

== Professional career ==
=== Cincinnati Bengals ===
After going undrafted in the 1997 NFL draft, Cottrell signed with the Cincinnati Bengals as an undrafted free agent. On July 28, 1997, he was waived by the team.

=== Jacksonville Jaguars ===
On July 30, 1997, the Jacksonville Jaguars signed Cottrell. On August 18, 1997, he was released.

=== New England Patriots ===
On February 2, 1998, Cottrell was signed by the New England Patriots. On August 25, he was waived by the team. On December 9, Cottrell was signed to the practice squad. On December 19, he was signed to the active roster. Cottrell played three games, including the Wild Card game against the Jaguars. On September 5, 1999, he was released by the team.

=== England Monarchs ===
On February 18, 1998, Cottrell was allocated to the England Monarchs of NFL Europe. He had 19 tackles and one sack.
