= Mel Agee =

American football player (1968–2008)

No. 90, 68, 92, 75
- Positions: Defensive end, defensive tackle

Personal information
- Born: November 22, 1968; Chicago, Illinois, U.S.
- Died: June 15, 2008 (aged 39); Lawrenceville, Georgia, U.S.
- Listed height: 6 ft 5 in (1.96 m)
- Listed weight: 300 lb (136 kg)

Career information
- High school: Washington (IL)
- College: Illinois (1987-1990)
- NFL draft: 1991: 6th round, 152nd overall pick

Career history
- Indianapolis Colts (1991–1992); Atlanta Falcons (1992–1995); Miami Dolphins (1996)*; Frankfurt Galaxy (1998); Tampa Bay Storm (1998–2002)
- * Offseason or practice squad member only

Awards and highlights
- 2× First-team All-Big Ten (1989, 1990); Second-team All-Big Ten (1988)

Career NFL statistics
- Tackles: 111
- Sacks: 2.5
- Forced fumbles: 2
- Stats at Pro Football Reference

Career AFL statistics
- Tackles: 25
- Sacks: 0.5
- Stats at ArenaFan.com

Melvin Laverne Agee Jr. (November 22, 1968 – June 15, 2008) was an American professional football player who played defensive lineman in the National Football League (NFL), NFL Europe, and the Arena Football League (AFL). In his 10-year career he played for the NFL's Indianapolis Colts (1991–1992) and Atlanta Falcons (1992–1995), NFL Europe's Frankfurt Galaxy (1998), and the AFL's Tampa Bay Storm (1998–2002). Agee played college football at the University of Illinois.

== Early life ==
Mel Agee was born on November 22, 1968, in Chicago, Illinois. He attended George Washington High School in Chicago, where he played football and basketball.

== College career ==
Agee played defensive tackle at the University of Illinois from 1987 through 1990. In 1988, was selected to the All-Big Ten Conference Second-Team. In 1989, Agee was selected to the All-Big Ten Conference First-Team. The 1989 season was the Fighting Illini's best with Agee. The team went 10–2, finishing the season ranked #10 in the AP poll after defeating Virginia in the 1990 Citrus Bowl. In the 1990 season, he repeated on the All-Big Ten Conference First-Team and earned an All-America honorable mention. Despite the team going 8–4, Illinois shared a Big Ten Conference title with three other teams.

As of 2024, Agee is ranked seventh all-time in Illinois history with 15 sacks during his college career.

Former NFL agent Josh Luchs alleged in the October 2010 issue of Sports Illustrated that he paid Agee 'several hundred dollars' while he was still a defensive lineman at Illinois in 1990.

== Professional career ==
At the 1991 NFL draft, Agee was selected by the Indianapolis Colts in the sixth round with the 152nd overall selection. Agee was reunited with former Illinois teammate Jeff George, who had been selected by the Colts first overall in the previous year's draft.

=== Indianapolis Colts (1991–1992) ===
As a rookie, Agee appeared in all 16 games with the Colts, earning two starts. He finished the 1991 season with 29 combined tackles and one forced fumble. Agee's forced fumble came in week four against the Detroit Lions when he was able to knock the ball loose from Barry Sanders where it was recovered by Colts linebacker Jeff Herrod. The Colts finished the season at 1–15, having fired head coach Ron Meyer after week five and replacing him with interim head coach Rick Venturi.

In 1992, Agee appeared in the first game of the season for the Colts before he was released by the team on September 11, 1992.

=== Atlanta Falcons (1992–1995) ===
Agee signed with the Atlanta Falcons on December 22, 1992. Agee was not activated for the Falcons final game of the 1992 season.

In 1993, Agee appeared in 11 games with seven starts as a defensive end. He recorded 43 combined tackles with 2.5 sacks and one forced fumble.

In the 1994 season, Agee was moved back to defensive tackle. He appeared in all 16 games with six starts. He recorded 32 combined tackles (24 solo, 8 assisted) on the season.

In 1995, Agee's final year with the Falcons, he appeared in 10 games and recorded seven tackles. The Falcons made it to the NFC playoffs, losing to the Green Bay Packers in the Wildcard round. Agee left Atlanta as an unrestricted free agent after the 1995 season.

=== Miami Dolphins (1996) ===
Agee was signed by the Miami Dolphins on July 27, 1996. He was released by the Dolphins on August 25, 1996, prior to the start of the regular season.

=== Frankfurt Galaxy (1998) ===
In 1998, Agee was drafted by the Frankfurt Galaxy of NFL Europe. He played in one season with Frankfurt, who won the NFL Europe regular season before losing to the Rhein Fire in World Bowl '98.

=== Tampa Bay Storm (1998–2002) ===
Agee joined the Tampa Bay Storm of the Arena Football League in 1998, where he played offensive line and defensive line. In five seasons with the Storm, Agee recorded eight receptions for 51 yards and five touchdowns on offense. On defense, he had 25 tackles with seven passes defended and one-half sack.

== Personal life and death ==
Agee held a bachelor's degree in mathematics. After leaving the NFL, Agee was living in the Atlanta, Georgia area where he worked as a sandblaster at a train manufacturing company.

Agee died of an apparent heart attack at his Lawrenceville, Georgia home on June 15, 2008, at age 39.
