= 1998 Amsterdam Admirals season =

NFL Europe team season

- General manager: Bill Peterson
- Head coach: Al Luginbill
- Home stadium: Amsterdam ArenA

Results
- Record: 7–3
- Division place: 3rd
- Playoffs: Did not qualify

The 1998 Amsterdam Admirals season was the fourth season for the Amsterdam Admirals in the NFL Europe League (NFLEL). The team was led by head coach Al Luginbill in his fourth year, and played its home games at Amsterdam ArenA in Amsterdam, Netherlands. They finished the regular season in third place with a record of seven wins and three losses.

== Personnel ==
=== Staff ===
1998 Amsterdam Admirals staff
Front office: General Manager – Bill Peterson; Head coaches: Head Coach/Defensive Coordinator – Al Luginbill; Offensive coaches: Offensive Coordinator/Quarterbacks/Wide Receivers – Joe Clark; Running Backs – Derrick Burroughs; Offensive Line – Al Tanara	Defensive coaches: Defensive Line – Jim Hilles; Linebackers – Chris L. Allen

=== Roster ===
1998 Amsterdam Admirals final roster
Quarterbacks: 9 Jake Delhomme; 13 Kurt Warner; Running backs: 22 Ralph Dawkins; 35 Malcolm Thomas; Wide receivers: 12 Juan Daniels; 8 Joe Douglass; 15 Todd Doxzon; 19 James Kidd; 87 Barry Kloeth; 2 Jason Shelley; Tight ends: 88 Jarius Hayes; 45 Josh Wilcox	Offensive linemen: 76 Winston Alderson T; 63 Chuck Belin G; 79 Kevin Farkas T; 70 Shawn Harper T; 64 Ryan Leahy G; 66 Ron Lewis G; 68 Darryl Moore G/T; 62 Tom Nütten G; 65 Earl Scott C; Defensive linemen: 99 Romeo Bandison DT; 92 Vernon Edwards DE; 91 Ta'ase Faumui DE; 93 Nick Gianacakos DE; 95 Jon Kirksey DT; 55 Rico Mack DE; 97 Chuck Osborne DT; 94 Kevin Sheahan DT	Linebackers: 59 Myron Newsome MLB; 54 Ratcliff Thomas OLB; 56 Trevor Wilmot OLB; 53 Rich Yurkiewicz OLB; Defensive backs: 29 Antonio Banks CB; 26 Kevin Devine CB; 42 Johnny Dixon SS; 40 Donald Frank CB; 36 Scott Gumina FS; 39 Ricky Parker SS; 28 Jeff Russell FS; 27 Dexter Seigler CB; Special teams: 11 Lance Anderson P; 10 Will Brice P	National players: 23 (Netherlands) Rey Agaoglu FS; 14 (Netherlands) Silvio Diliberto K; 57 (Japan) Masafumi Kawaguchi MLB; 86 (Netherlands) Youri Salden WR; 33 (Netherlands) Frank Temming RB; Rookies in italics

== Standings ==
NFL Europe League
Team	W	L	T	PCT	PF	PA	Home	Road	STK
Frankfurt Galaxy	7	3	0	.700	177	163	3–2	4–1	W4
Rhein Fire	7	3	0	.700	198	142	4–1	3–2	L2
Amsterdam Admirals	7	3	0	.700	205	174	4–1	3–2	W3
Barcelona Dragons	4	6	0	.400	185	200	3–2	1–4	L3
England Monarchs	3	7	0	.300	158	205	2–3	1–4	W2
Scottish Claymores	2	8	0	.200	153	192	2–3	0–5	L3
