= Trevor Wilmot =

American football player (born 1972)

No. 96
- Position: Linebacker

Personal information
- Born: October 30, 1972 (age 54); Evanston, Illinois
- Listed height: 6 ft 2 in (1.88 m)
- Listed weight: 215 lb (98 kg)

Career information
- High school: Evanston (IL) Township
- College: Indiana
- NFL draft: 1995: undrafted

Career history
- Indianapolis Colts (1995); Amsterdam Admirals (1997–1998)
- Stats at Pro Football Reference

Trevor Wilmot was born on October 30, 1972. He was formerly American football linebacker. He played for the Indianapolis Colts in 1995.
