= Bill Khayat =

American football player and coach (born 1973)

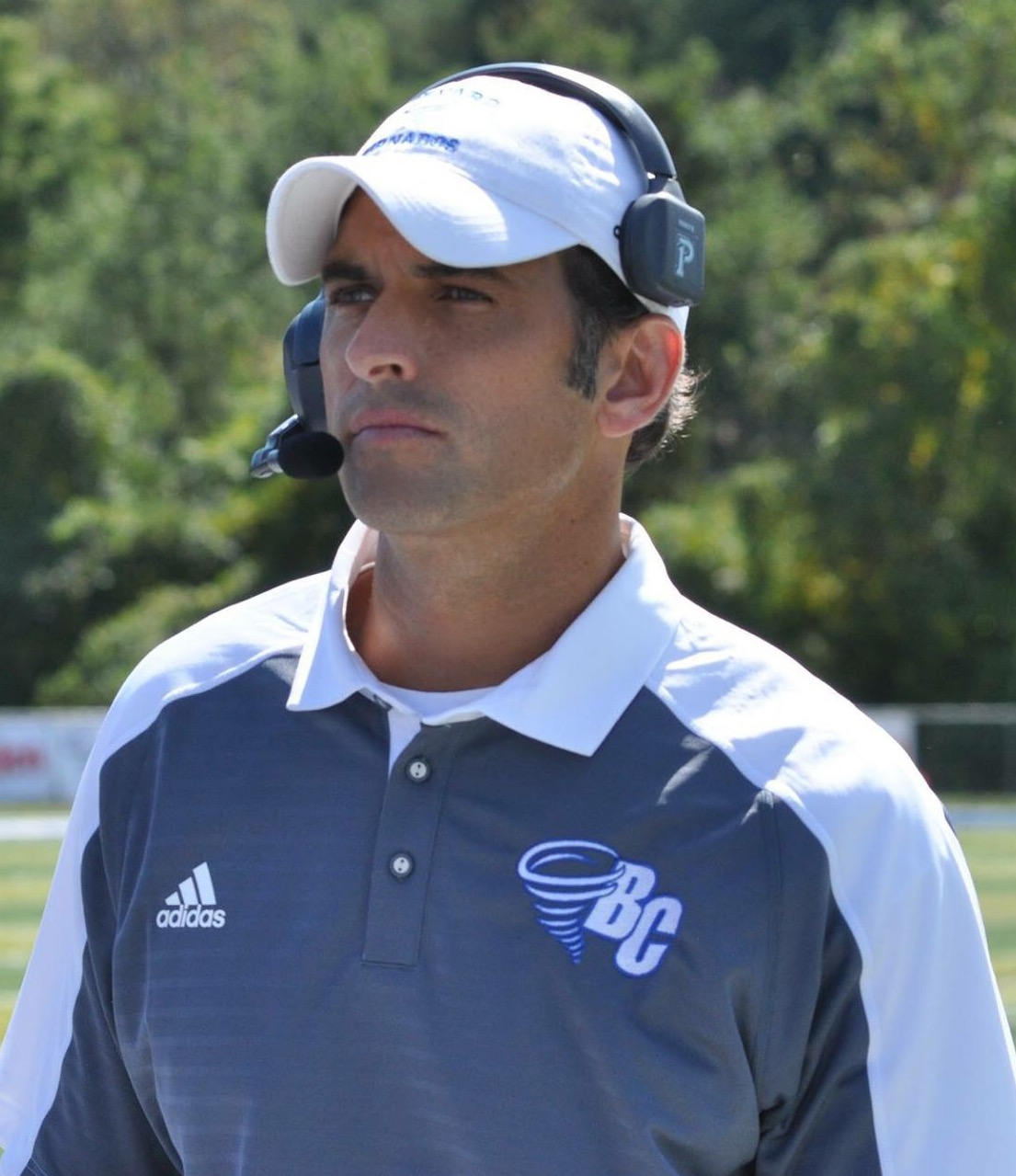

Brevard Tornadoes
- Title: Head coach

Personal information
- Born: March 26, 1973 (age 53); Camden, New Jersey, U.S.

Career information
- College: Duke
- NFL draft: 1996: undrafted

Career history

Playing
- Dallas Cowboys (1996)*; Kansas City Chiefs (1996)*; Baltimore Ravens (1997)*; Carolina Panthers (1997)*; Barcelona Dragons (1998); Tennessee Oilers (1998)*
- * Offseason or practice squad member only

Coaching
- Tennessee State (2000–2002) Tight ends coach; Tennessee State (2003) Running backs coach & recruiting coordinator; Arizona Cardinals (2004–2006) Offensive quality control coach & assistant offensive line coach; Washington Redskins (2007–2009) Offensive quality control coach & assistant tight ends coach; Sacramento Mountain Lions (2010–2011) Tight ends coach & assistant offensive line coach; Tennessee State (2013) Tight ends coach & assistant special teams coach; Tennessee State (2014) Co-special teams coordinator & tight ends coach; Tennessee State (2015) Co-special teams coordinator, offensive run game coordinator, & tight ends coach; Scottsdale (2016) Running backs coach & assistant special teams coach; Brevard (2017–present) Head coach; Pittsburgh Maulers (2022) Assistant head coach, pass game coordinator, & tight ends coach; Pittsburgh Maulers (2023) Running backs coach & tight ends coach

Awards and highlights
- 2× Second-team All-ACC (1994, 1995)

Head coaching record
- Regular season: 47–36 (.566)
- Postseason: 1–0 (1.000)
- Career: 48–36 (.571)

Bill Khayat (born March 26, 1973) is an American football coach and former tight end. He is the head football coach for Brevard College, a position he has held since 2017.

== Playing career ==
After going undrafted, Khayat was on the practice squads of the Kansas City Chiefs (1996) and the Carolina Panthers (1997), and in 1998 he played for the Barcelona Dragons of NFL Europe.

== Head coaching record ==
Year	Team	Overall	Conference	Standing	Bowl/playoffs
Brevard Tornados (NCAA Division III independent) (2017)
2017	Brevard	4–6			
Brevard Tornados (USA South Athletic Conference) (2018–present)
2018	Brevard	4–6	3–4	5th	
2019	Brevard	8–2	5–2	2nd	W Robert M. "Scotty" Whitelaw
2020–21	Brevard	4–1	2–1	T–2nd	
2021	Brevard	6–4	6–2	3rd	
2022	Brevard	5–5	5–2	T–3rd	
2023	Brevard	5–5	5–2	T–3rd	
2024	Brevard	6–3	5–2	3rd	
2025	Brevard	6–4	4–3	4th	
2026	Brevard	8-2	5-2	3rd	
Brevard:		56–38	43–20		
Total:		56–38			
