= Ben Lynch =

American football player (born 1972)

No. 60, 62
- Position: Center

Personal information
- Born: November 18, 1972 (age 53); Santa Rosa, California, U.S.
- Listed height: 6 ft 4 in (1.93 m)
- Listed weight: 295 lb (134 kg)

Career information
- High school: Analy (Sebastopol, California)
- College: California
- NFL draft: 1996: 7th round, 211th overall pick

Career history
- Kansas City Chiefs (1996)*; Minnesota Vikings (1997); Frankfurt Galaxy (1998); Chicago Bears (1998)*; San Francisco 49ers (1999–2002); Houston Texans (2003)
- * Offseason or practice squad member only

Awards and highlights
- All-NFL Europe (1998)

Career NFL statistics
- Games played: 52
- Games started: 2
- Stats at Pro Football Reference

Benjamin John Lynch (born November 18, 1972) is an American former professional football player who was a center for four seasons in the National Football League (NFL) for the San Francisco 49ers. He played college football for the California Golden Bears.

== Professional career ==
=== Kansas City Chiefs ===
Lynch was selected by the Kansas City Chiefs in the seventh round (211th overall) of the 1996 NFL draft. He was released on August 20.

=== Minnesota Vikings ===
Lynch was signed by the Minnesota Vikings on February 10, 1997.

=== Frankfurt Galaxy ===
Lynch was selected by the Frankfurt Galaxy in the first round (second overall) of the 1998 NFL Europe Draft.

=== Houston Texans ===
The Houston Texans signed Lynch on August 4, 2003. He suffered a season-ending knee injury in a preseason game against the San Diego Chargers on August 23. The Texans placed him on the injured reserve list on August 25.
