= Israel Stanley =

American football player (born 1970)

No. 90, 99
- Position: Defensive lineman

Personal information
- Born: April 21, 1970 (age 56); San Diego, California, U.S.
- Listed height: 6 ft 3 in (1.91 m)
- Listed weight: 260 lb (118 kg)

Career information
- High school: Point Loma (San Diego)
- College: Arizona State
- NFL draft: 1993: undrafted

Career history
- San Diego Chargers (1993); Tampa Bay Buccaneers (1994)*; New Orleans Saints (1995); Rhein Fire (1997); Tampa Bay Buccaneers (1997)*; Frankfurt Galaxy (1998); Milwaukee Mustangs (1998); San Diego Chargers (1999); → Berlin Thunder (1999); Milwaukee Mustangs (2001)*
- * Offseason or practice squad member only
- Stats at Pro Football Reference
- Stats at ArenaFan.com

Israel Damon Stanley (born April 21, 1970) is an American former professional football defensive lineman who played for the New Orleans Saints of the National Football League (NFL). He played college football for the Arizona State Sun Devils.

== Early life ==
Israel Damon Stanley was born on April 21, 1970, in San Diego, California. He attended Point Loma High School in San Diego.

== College career ==
Stanley enrolled at Arizona State University to play college football for the Sun Devils. He was a letterman in 1988, 1989, 1990, and 1992. He missed the 1991 season as a medical redshirt. Stanley earned honorable mention All-Pac-10 honors as a senior in 1992.

== Professional career ==
After going undrafted in the 1993 NFL draft, Stanley signed with the San Diego Chargers on May 6. He was released on August 22 and signed to the practice squad on September 1. He was promoted to the active roster on December 15 but did not play in any games for the Chargers during the 1993 season. Stanley was waived on August 22, 1994.

Stanley was claimed off waivers by the Tampa Bay Buccaneers on August 23, 1994. He was waived by Tampa Bay on August 28, 1994.

Stanley was signed by the New Orleans Saints on March 7, 1995. He played in 14 games for the Saints during the 1995 season as a reserve defensive lineman, recording eight solo tackles, one assisted tackle, two sacks, two forced fumbles, and one fumble recovery.

On February 18, 1997, Stanley was selected by the Rhein Fire of the World League of American Football (WLAF) with the first overall pick in the 1997 WLAF draft. He played for the Fire during the 1997 WLAF season, posting 24 tackles, 5.5 sacks, and four pass breakups. The Fire finished the year with a 7–3 record and advanced to World Bowl '97, where they lost to the Barcelona Dragons by a score of 38–24

Stanley signed with the Buccaneers again on August 5, 1997. He was waived again on August 18, 1997.

Stanley played for the Frankfurt Galaxy during the 1998 NFL Europe season, recording seven tackles, one sack, and one pass breakup. The Galaxy lost World Bowl '98 to Stanley's former team, the Fire.

On June 30, 1998, Stanley signed a one-year contract with the Milwaukee Mustangs of the Arena Football League (AFL). He was an offensive lineman/defensive lineman during his time in the AFL as the league played under ironman rules. He played in four games for Milwaukee during the 1998 AFL season, totaling one solo tackle, one assisted tackle, one sack, two forced fumbles, and two fumble recoveries.

Stanley signed with the Chargers again on March 24, 1999. He was allocated to NFL Europe to play for the Berlin Thunder. During the 1999 NFL Europe season, he posted 14 tackles, 2.5 sacks, one forced fumble, and two pass breakups. Stanley was on the Chargers' active roster during the 1999 NFL season but did not play in any games. He was released on February 11, 2000.

On December 4, 2000, the Mustangs traded Stanley's AFL rights to the Nashville Kats for Buster Owens. The same day, the Kats then traded Stanley to the Los Angeles Avengers for future considerations. However, on January 19, 2001, the three-team trade was voided by the league, with Stanley returning to the Mustangs. He was placed on recallable waivers by Milwaukee on February 12, 2001. He was recalled from waivers on February 14, 2001, but never played for the Mustangs that year.

== Personal life ==
In 1997, Stanley founded the Israel Stanley Youth Foundation. He was a scout for the St. Louis Rams during the 2000 and 2001 seasons.
