= Kerry Hicks =

American football player (born 1972)

No. 94, 96
- Position: Defensive end

Personal information
- Born: December 29, 1972 (age 53); Bountiful, Utah, U.S.
- Listed height: 6 ft 6 in (1.98 m)
- Listed weight: 283 lb (128 kg)

Career information
- High school: Highland (Salt Lake City, Utah)
- College: Colorado (1991–1995)
- NFL draft: 1996: 7th round, 234th overall pick

Career history
- Carolina Panthers (1996)*; Kansas City Chiefs (1996–1997); Scottish Claymores (1998); San Francisco 49ers (1998)*
- * Offseason or practice squad member only

Awards and highlights
- 2× First-team All-Big Eight (1993, 1995)

Career NFL statistics
- Games played: 2
- Tackles: 2
- Stats at Pro Football Reference

Kerry Dale Hicks (born December 29, 1972) is an American former professional football player who was a defensive end for the Kansas City Chiefs of the National Football League (NFL). He played college football for the Colorado Buffaloes.

== Early life ==
Hicks was born on December 29, 1972, in Bountiful, Utah. He attended Highland High School in Salt Lake City, Utah.

== College career ==
Hicks played college football for the Colorado Buffaloes from 1991 to 1995 and was a four-year letterman from 1992 to 1995. As a senior, he had 64 tackles, including eight for loss and two fumble recoveries for touchdowns. Hicks earned first-team All-Big Eight honors in 1993 and 1995.

== Professional career ==
=== Carolina Panthers ===
Hicks was selected in the seventh round, with the 234th overall selection, by the Carolina Panthers in the 1996 NFL draft. On July 9, he signed his rookie contract with the team. On August 21, Hicks was waived.

=== Kansas City Chiefs ===
On August 27, 1996, Hicks was signed to the practice squad of the Kansas City Chiefs. On October 14, he was elevated to the active roster. On November 16, Hicks was placed on the reserve/non-football injury list with a flulike virus. In 1997, he played in two games, where he made two tackles. On September 23, Hicks was released by the team.

=== Scottish Claymores ===
In 1998, Hicks played for the Scottish Claymores of NFL Europe. He 21 tackles, one sack, eight pass deflections and one forced fumble.

=== San Francisco 49ers ===
On June 30, 1998, Hicks was signed by the San Francisco 49ers. On August 19, he was released by the team.
