= 1998 NFL Europe season =

European-American football season

The 1998 NFL Europe season was the sixth season in 8 years of the American football league that started out as the World League of American Football. 1998 was the first season the league was known as NFL Europe. The London Monarchs changed their names to the England Monarchs for the 1998 season.

NFL Europe League
Team	W	L	T	PCT	PF	PA	Home	Road	STK
Frankfurt Galaxy	7	3	0	.700	177	163	3–2	4–1	W4
Rhein Fire	7	3	0	.700	198	142	4–1	3–2	L2
Amsterdam Admirals	7	3	0	.700	205	174	4–1	3–2	W3
Barcelona Dragons	4	6	0	.400	185	200	3–2	1–4	L3
England Monarchs	3	7	0	.300	158	205	2–3	1–4	W2
Scottish Claymores	2	8	0	.200	153	192	2–3	0–5	L3

== World Bowl '98 ==
The championship game, World Bowl '98, was played on Sunday, June 14, 1998, at the Waldstadion in Frankfurt, Germany. The Rhein Fire defeated the Frankfurt Galaxy, 34–10.
