= 1999 Frankfurt Galaxy season =

NFL Europe team season

- General manager: Tilman Engel
- Head coach: Dick Curl
- Home stadium: Waldstadion

Results
- Record: 6–4
- Division place: 2nd
- Playoffs: World Bowl '99 champion

The 1999 Frankfurt Galaxy season was the seventh season for the franchise in the NFL Europe League (NFLEL). The team was led by head coach Dick Curl in his second year, and played its home games at Waldstadion in Frankfurt, Germany. They finished the regular season in second place with a record of six wins and four losses. In World Bowl '99, Frankfurt defeated the Barcelona Dragons 38–24. The victory marked the franchise's second World Bowl championship.

== Personnel ==
=== Staff ===
1999 Frankfurt Galaxy (NFL Europe) staff
Front office: General Manager – Tilman Engel; Head coaches: Head Coach/Offensive Backs – Dick Curl; Offensive coaches: Offensive Coordinator/Wide Receivers – Joe Clark; National Coach/Tight Ends – Alessandro Cinelli; Offensive Line – Bob Bicknell	Defensive coaches: Defensive Coordinator/Defensive Backs – Dan Daniel; Defensive Line – Charles Jones; Linebackers – Ed O'Neil

=== Roster ===
1999 Frankfurt Galaxy final roster
Quarterbacks: 14 Pat Barnes; 16 Jake Delhomme; Running backs: 22 Jermaine Chaney; 20 Rene Ingoglia; 33 Marc Kacmarynski; Wide receivers: 5 Mario Bailey; 81 Todd Floyd; 18 Andy McCullough; 19 Shawn Scales; Tight ends: 82 Ron Leshinski	Offensive linemen: 64 Robert Barr G; 70 Dan Finn G; 77 Jay Hagood T; 69 Curtis McGee T; 74 Dan Palmer G/T; 63 Juan Porter C; 68 Steve Scifres G/C; 79 Todd Stewart T; Defensive linemen: 95 Vince Amey DT; 73 Denauld Brown DT; 94 Kendrick Gholston DE; 96 Harold Gragg DE; 91 David Hoelscher DE (IR); 92 Willie Whitehead DE	Linebackers: 56 Craig Guest MLB; 90 Keaton Cromartie OLB; 57 Jimmy Clements OLB; 54 Whit Marshall OLB; 50 John Munch OLB; 58 Derek Strey MLB; Defensive backs: 27 Jamaal Alexander S; 25 Ron Bailey CB; 24 Dorian Brew CB; 36 Jim Cantelupe S; 29 Cory Gilliard S; 26 Alonzo Hampton CB; 30 Michael Hicks CB; 28 Clarence Love CB; 21 Tony Maranto S; 23 Mike Reed CB; Special teams: 2 Barry Cantrell P	National players: 71 (Germany) Jens Allers DT; 1 (Germany) Stephan Bauer K; 84 (Austria) Benjamin Dieplinger WR; 11 (Germany) Patrick Gerigk WR; 86 (Germany) Werner Hippler TE; 89 (Germany) Christoph Jeromin WR; 9 (Germany) Ralf Kleinmann K; 66 (Germany) André Mathes G; 75 (Germany) Marcus Richter DT; 72 (Austria) Mario Sischka DE; 12 (Germany) Joachim Ullrich QB; Rookies in italics

== Schedule ==
Week	Date	Kickoff (Note: All times local to where the game was played.)	Opponent	Results		Game site	Attendance
Week	Date	Kickoff	Opponent	Final score	Team record	Game site	Attendance
1	Saturday, April 17	7:00 p.m.	Berlin Thunder	W 21–20	1–0	Waldstadion	30,127
2	Saturday, April 24	7:00 p.m.	at Amsterdam Admirals	L 13–17	1–1	Amsterdam ArenA	14,568
3	Sunday, May 2	3:00 p.m.	at Scottish Claymores	W 42–35 ^{OT}	2–1	Murrayfield Stadium	10,169
4	Saturday, May 8	7:00 p.m.	Rhein Fire	W 13–7	3–1	Waldstadion	39,485
5	Saturday, May 15	8:00 p.m.	at Barcelona Dragons	L 15–21 ^{OT}	3–2	Estadi Olímpic	9,326
6	Saturday, May 22	7:00 p.m.	Scottish Claymores	L 35–42	3–3	Waldstadion	33,915
7	Saturday, May 29	7:00 p.m.	at Rhein Fire	W 21–20	4–3	Rheinstadion	40,143
8	Saturday, June 5	7:00 p.m.	Amsterdam Admirals	W 21–14	5–3	Waldstadion	35,981
9	Sunday, June 13	3:00 p.m.	at Berlin Thunder	W 32–19	6–3	Jahn-Sportpark	10,783
10	Sunday, June 20	7:00 p.m.	Barcelona Dragons	L 26–28	6–4	Waldstadion	42,127

== Standings ==
NFL Europe League
Team	W	L	T	PCT	PF	PA	Home	Road	STK
Barcelona Dragons	7	3	0	.700	263	246	4–1	3–2	W1
Frankfurt Galaxy	6	4	0	.600	239	223	3–2	3–2	L1
Rhein Fire	6	4	0	.600	286	149	3–2	3–2	W3
Amsterdam Admirals	4	6	0	.400	236	243	3–2	1–4	W2
Scottish Claymores	4	6	0	.400	270	298	2–3	2–3	L4
Berlin Thunder	3	7	0	.300	173	308	2–3	1–4	L3

== Game summaries ==
=== Week 2: at Amsterdam Admirals ===
Week Two: Frankfurt Galaxy at Amsterdam Admirals – Game summary

Quarter	1	2	3	4	Total
Frankfurt	3	0	10	0	13
Amsterdam	0	3	7	7	17

at Amsterdam ArenA, Amsterdam, Netherlands

- Date: Saturday, April 24
- Game time: 7:00 p.m. CEST
- Game attendance: 14,568

=== Week 8: vs Amsterdam Admirals ===
Week Eight: Amsterdam Admirals at Frankfurt Galaxy – Game summary

Quarter	1	2	3	4	Total
Amsterdam	0	0	0	14	14
Frankfurt	0	14	0	7	21

at Waldstadion, Frankfurt, Germany

- Date: Saturday, June 5
- Game time: 7:00 p.m. CEST
- Game attendance: 35,981
