= 1999 Barcelona Dragons season =

NFL Europe team season

1999 Barcelona Dragons (NFL Europe) season
- General manager: Marco Fusté
- Head coach: Jack Bicknell
- Home stadium: Estadi Olímpic de Montjuïc

Results
- Record: 7–3
- Division place: 1st
- Playoffs: Lost World Bowl '99

The 1999 Barcelona Dragons season was the seventh season for the franchise in the NFL Europe League (NFLEL). The team was led by head coach Jack Bicknell in his seventh year, and played its home games at Estadi Olímpic de Montjuïc in Barcelona, Catalonia, Spain. They finished the regular season in first place with a record of seven wins and three losses. In World Bowl '99, Barcelona lost to the Frankfurt Galaxy 38–24.

== Personnel ==
=== Staff ===
1999 Barcelona Dragons staff
Front office: President – Miguel Matas; General manager – Marco Fusté; Interim General Manager – Willy de Wit; Head coaches: Head coach – Jack Bicknell; Offensive coaches: Offensive coordinator/offensive line – Vince Martino; Quarterbacks/wide receivers – Peter Vaas; National Coach/running backs – Juan Jiménez	Defensive coaches: Defensive coordinator/linebackers – Red Kelin; Defensive line – Sam Clancy; Defensive backs – Chip Beake; Strength and conditioning: Strength and conditioning – Richard Howell

=== Roster ===
1999 Barcelona Dragons final roster
Quarterbacks: 8 Todd Bouman; 12 Jim Murphy; 7 James Ritchey; Running backs: 35 Marrio Grier; 2 Lawrence Phillips; Wide receivers: 80 Thabiti Davis; 81 Brian Finneran; 5 Alonzo Johnson; 11 Kaipo McGuire; Tight ends: 85 Scott Dragos; 86 Cam Quayle	Offensive linemen: 61 Michael Batiste G; 74 Tom Claro G/T; 70 Tarren Crawford G; 55 Matt Hogg T/C; 60 Matt Reem C; 79 Deron Thorp T; 71 Melvin Tuten T; Defensive linemen: 94 Kendrick Burton DE; 95 Winfield Garnett DT; 90 Jarett Loggins DT; 99 Barry Mitchell DE; 93 Brandon Noble DT; 92 Marvin Thomas DE	Linebackers: 50 Lyron Cobbins OLB; 51 Mike Maslowski MLB; 57 Mike Parker OLB; 56 Dave Thomas OLB; 54 Nate Wayne OLB; Defensive backs: 30 Ricky Bell CB; 27 Calvin Branch S; 25 Dante DePaolo S; 45 Kadar Hamilton S; 23 Tristan Moss CB; 38 Tori Noel CB; 24 Tyrone Smith CB; 21 Jason Suttle CB; Special teams: 10 Jeff Beckley P	National players: 14 (Spain) Jesús Angoy K; 59 (Spain) Dani Garcia MLB; 16 (Spain) Rafa Garcia K; 20 (France) Samyr Hamoudi S; 66 (Spain) Ivan Imbernon DE; 36 (France) Gregoire Malo S; 1 (Mexico) Marco Martos WR; 39 (Spain) Jason Miller-Lopez RB; 89 (Spain) Vicenç Rodríguez TE; 82 (Mexico) Carlos Rosado WR; Rookies in italics

== Schedule ==
Week	Date	Kickoff (Note: All times local to where the game was played.)	Opponent	Results		Game site	Attendance
Week	Date	Kickoff	Opponent	Final score	Team record	Game site	Attendance
1	Saturday, April 17	8:00 p.m.	Amsterdam Admirals	W 28–16	1–0	Estadi Olímpic de Montjuïc	14,624
2	Sunday, April 25	4:00 p.m.	at Rhein Fire	W 19–10	2–0	Rheinstadion	25,281
3	Saturday, May 1	8:00 p.m.	Berlin Thunder	W 42–10	3–0	Estadi Olímpic de Montjuïc	9,685
4	Sunday, May 9	3:00 p.m.	at Scottish Claymores	L 21–31	3–1	Murrayfield Stadium	8,864
5	Saturday, May 15	8:00 p.m.	Frankfurt Galaxy	W 21–15 ^{OT}	4–1	Estadi Olímpic de Montjuïc	9,326
6	Sunday, May 23	7:00 p.m.	at Berlin Thunder	L 20–27	4–2	Jahn-Sportpark	8,667
7	Saturday, May 29	7:00 p.m.	at Amsterdam Admirals	W 28–17	5–2	Amsterdam ArenA	10,252
8	Sunday, June 6	7:00 p.m.	Scottish Claymores	W 42–35	6–2	Estadi Olímpic de Montjuïc	10,687
9	Saturday, June 12	8:00 p.m.	Rhein Fire	L 14–59	6–3	Estadi Olímpic de Montjuïc	10,155
10	Sunday, June 20	7:00 p.m.	at Frankfurt Galaxy	W 28–26	7–3	Waldstadion	42,127

== Standings ==
NFL Europe League
Team	W	L	T	PCT	PF	PA	Home	Road	STK
Barcelona Dragons	7	3	0	.700	263	246	4–1	3–2	W1
Frankfurt Galaxy	6	4	0	.600	239	223	3–2	3–2	L1
Rhein Fire	6	4	0	.600	286	149	3–2	3–2	W3
Amsterdam Admirals	4	6	0	.400	236	243	3–2	1–4	W2
Scottish Claymores	4	6	0	.400	270	298	2–3	2–3	L4
Berlin Thunder	3	7	0	.300	173	308	2–3	1–4	L3

== Game summaries ==
=== Week 1: vs Amsterdam Admirals ===
Week One: Amsterdam Admirals at Barcelona Dragons – Game summary

Quarter	1	2	3	4	Total
Amsterdam	0	3	0	13	16
Barcelona	0	0	14	14	28

at Estadi Olímpic de Montjuïc, Barcelona, Spain

- Date: Saturday, April 17
- Game time: 8:00 p.m. CEST
- Game attendance: 14,624

=== Week 7: at Amsterdam Admirals ===
Week Seven: Barcelona Dragons at Amsterdam Admirals – Game summary

Quarter	1	2	3	4	Total
Barcelona	0	7	7	14	28
Amsterdam	7	3	7	0	17

at Amsterdam ArenA, Amsterdam, Netherlands

- Date: Saturday, May 29
- Game time: 7:00 p.m. CEST
- Game attendance: 10,252
