= Dick Curl =

American football player and coach (born 1940)

Biographical details
- Born: May 4, 1940 (age 86); Chester, Pennsylvania, U.S.
- Education: University of Richmond

Playing career
- 1958–1961: Richmond
- Position: Quarterback

Coaching career (HC unless noted)
- 1973: Trenton State (OC/QB)
- 1974: Trenton State
- 1983–1989: Rutgers (OC)
- 1990: Boston College (QB)
- 1991–1997: Barcelona Dragons (OC)
- 1998–2000: Frankfurt Galaxy
- 2006: Kansas City Chiefs (asst to HC)
- 2007–2008: Kansas City Chiefs (asst HC/QB)
- 2009–2010: St. Louis Rams (asst HC/QB)

Head coaching record
- Overall: 5–4–1 (college); 18–14 (NFL Europe)

Accomplishments and honors

Championships
- World Bowl '99

Awards
- 2× NFL Europe Coach of the Year (1998, 1999)

Richard Curl (born May 4, 1940) is an American former football player and coach. He served as the head football coach at Trenton State College in 1974, compiling a record of 5–4–1. Curl also was the head coach for the Frankfurt Galaxy of NFL Europe from 1998 to 2000. He led the Galaxy to an overall record of 18–14, including a World Bowl championship in 1999. He was the quarterback coach and assistant head coach at the St. Louis Rams until his retirement in January 2011.

== Head coaching record ==
=== College ===
| Year | Team | Overall | Conference | Standing | Bowl/playoffs |
|---|---|---|---|---|---|
Trenton State Lions (New Jersey State Athletic Conference) (1974)
| 1974 | Trenton State | 5–4–1 | 3–1–1 | 3rd | |
| Trenton State: | | 5–4–1 | 3–1–1 | | |
| Total: | | 5–4–1 | | | |

=== NFL Europe ===
| Year | Team | Regular season | | | | | Postseason | | | |
| Year | Team | Won | Lost | Ties | Win % | Finish | Won | Lost | Win % | Result |
|---|---|---|---|---|---|---|---|---|---|---|
| 1998 | FRA | 7 | 3 | 0 | .700 | 2nd (League) | 0 | 1 | .000 | Lost to Rhein Fire in World Bowl '98 |
| 1999 | FRA | 6 | 4 | 0 | .600 | 2nd (League) | 1 | 0 | 1.000 | World Bowl '99 champion |
| 2000 | FRA | 4 | 6 | 0 | .400 | 5th (League) | – | – | — | — |
| Total | | 17 | 13 | 0 | .567 | | 1 | 1 | .500 | |
