= Dialleo Burks =

American football player and coach (born 1974)

Warner Royals
- Title: Head coach

Personal information
- Born: July 7, 1974 (age 52); LaGrange, Georgia, U.S.
- Listed height: 6 ft 3 in (1.91 m)
- Listed weight: 195 lb (88 kg)

Career information
- High school: LaGrange (LaGrange, Georgia)
- College: Eastern Kentucky
- NFL draft: 1996: undrafted

Career history

Playing
- Philadelphia Eagles (1996)*; Philadelphia Eagles (1998); Rhein Fire (1998–1999); Carolina Panthers (1999–2000); Orlando Rage (2001); Oakland Raiders (2001)*; Carolina Panthers (2001)*; Dallas Desperados (2002–2003); Georgia Force (2004–2005); Grand Rapids Rampage (2005); Dallas Desperados (2006–2007)
- * Offseason or practice squad member only

Coaching
- Hopewell HS (NC) (2002) Assistant coach; Berkmar HS (GA) (2004–2005) Special teams coordinator & wide receivers coach; LaGrange (2006–2009) Wide receivers coach; Georgia Force (2008) Special teams coordinator, fullbacks coach & linebackers coach; Troup HS (TX) (2010) Assistant coach; LaGrange HS (GA) (2011–2012) Assistant coach; Lafayette HS (AL) (2013) Head coach; LaGrange HS (GA) (2014–2017) Head coach; Warner (2022–present) Head coach

Operations
- Lafayette HS (AL) (2013) Athletic director

Awards and highlights
- World Bowl champion (VI)

Career AFL statistics
- Receptions: 389
- Receiving yards: 4,897
- Receiving touchdowns: 107
- Total tackles: 47
- Interceptions: 7
- Stats at ArenaFan.com

Head coaching record
- Career: 7–31 (.184)
- Stats at Pro Football Reference

Dialleo Burks Sr. dee-AH-low (born July 7, 1974) is an American football coach and former arena football wide receiver and linebacker. He is the head football coach for Warner University, a position he has held since 2022. He played college football at Eastern Kentucky.

Burks has played for the Philadelphia Eagles, Carolina Panthers, and Oakland Raiders of the National Football League (NFL), the Rhein Fire of NFL Europe, the Orlando Rage of the XFL, the Georgia Force, Grand Rapids Rampage, and the Dallas Desperados of the Arena Football League (AFL).

== Early life ==
Burks attended LaGrange High School. While there he was a wide receiver, and teammate of future NFL cornerback Walt Harris. Burks help LaGrange earn the #1 ranking in America by USA Today in 1991.

== College career ==
Burks finished his collegiate career with 94 receptions for 1,430 yards (15.2 avg.) and 12 touchdowns. As a junior, he led the team with 599 receiving yards and six touchdowns. He was also a member of the schools track team, competing in the high jump. As a senior, he helped Eastern Kentucky to a 9–3 regular season record and a spot in the NCAA Division I-AA playoffs.

== Professional career ==
=== National Football League (1996–2001) ===
In 1996, Burks signed with the Philadelphia Eagles as a rookie free agent but was released at the end of training camp. He was then signed to the Eagles' practice squad. However, he was re-signed by the Eagles to the active roster on November 22, 1996. He was inactive for the final four regular season games. He was active, but did not play in the Eagles NFC Wild Card Game at the San Francisco 49ers. He was later released, and was out of football in 1997.

=== NFL Europe (1998–1999) ===
In 1998, Burks was selected in the 11th round of the NFL Europe draft by the Rhein Fire, where he recorded 13 receptions for 109 yards and two touchdowns while backing up league MVP Marcus Robinson. In 1999, he led the team with 32 receptions for 656 yards and five touchdowns. In the Fire's World Bowl VI win over the Frankfurt Galaxy, he had two receptions for 35 yards, both for touchdowns.

=== National Football League (1999–2000) ===
After World Bowl VI, Burks then signed with the Carolina Panthers on July 13, but was released at the end of training camp. He was immediately signed to the Panthers' practice squad, where he remained until December 29 when he was signed to the active roster for the season finale against the New Orleans Saints, however he was inactive for the game.

In total, Burks was a member of the Panthers for four games, playing in one, in 2000 when he returned one kickoff for 25 yards, before being waived on October 3, 1999.

=== XFL (2001) ===
In 2001, Burks played for the Orlando Rage of the XFL, helping them to an 8–2 record by recording 34 receptions for 659 yards and seven touchdowns. His 19.4 yard-per-catch average led the league and his touchdown total was tied for second in the league. In week one of the season he caught three touchdown passes from quarterback Jeff Brohm.

Burks was signed by the Oakland Raiders on July 27, 2001. But was later released. He was then re-signed by the Carolina Panthers on August 13, 2001. He was however released on September 3, 2001.

=== Arena Football League (2002–2007) ===
==== Dallas Desperados (2002–2003) ====
In 2002, Burks made the transition to arena football, by signing with the Dallas Desperados of the Arena Football League (AFL). In his rookie season, he led the team with 54 receptions for 677 yards and 16 touchdowns before suffering a fractured wrist against the Indiana Firebirds that ended his season. He was placed on injured reserve on June 11, and underwent surgery to repair the wrist the next day. After missing the second half of the season, he returned to the field in 2003 and set franchise single-season records in receptions (102), receiving yards (1,226) and touchdowns (28).

==== Georgia Force (2004–2005) ====
In 2004, Burks signed with the Georgia Force and went on to earn the team's Ironman of the Year award after making the switch from Offensive specialist to wide receiver / linebacker. He finished the year with 73 receptions for 1,075 yards (second best in team single-season history) and 18 touchdowns while posting 25.5 tackles, nine pass breakups and two picks on defense and returning six kickoffs 61 yards.

In his Force debut against the New York Dragons, Burks caught four passes for 72 yards and recorded one tackle. His 2005 season was slowed due to injury. Due to those injuries he played in only four games, recording just 18 catches for 180 yards, one tackle and one interception before being traded to the Grand Rapids Rampage. With the Force, Burks returned to health and recorded 34 receptions for 382 yards and seven touchdowns. He earned Defensive Player-of-the-Game honors in the home opener against the New Orleans VooDoo after recording just his third career interception and a pass defensed. Burks also added three catches for 41 yards. He recorded three catches for 25 yards at the Avengers before being placed on reserve/injured on February 10 with a hamstring injury. He returned to play against the Buffalo Destroyers, recording six receptions for 46 yards. He added six receptions for 68 yards with a tackle on the road against the Dragons before returning to the reserve/injured list with the same hamstring injury.

==== Grand Rapids Rampage (2006) ====
Burks was then traded to the Grand Rapids Rampage on March 30 in exchange for wide receiver / linebacker Chris Jackson. In his first game with the Rampage, Burks saw limited playing time against the Nashville Kats and recorded two receptions for 20 yards. Against the Colorado Crush, he recorded season-highs with nine catches for 100 yards and two touchdowns.

==== Dallas Desperados (2006–2007) ====
With the loss of Bobby Sippio in free agency, the Desperados signed Burks in the fall of 2005 to complete the starting line-up. He ranked in the top five in all career receiving categories in Dallas franchise history: receptions (fourth - 156); receiving yards (fifth - 1,904); and touchdowns (fifth - 44), when he returned to Dallas. In 2006, he finished the season with his highest number of touchdown catches (29) and his second highest totals for receptions (93) and receiving yards (1,130). He carried the ball seven times for 20 yards and two touchdowns. He was named Player-of-the-Game for the Desperados 55–48 win over the Las Vegas Gladiators, for his 10 catches, 114 receiving yards, four touchdown receptions, one rushing touchdown. Then, in 2007, he finished fifth in receiving for the Desperados with 18 receptions from 243 yards, averaging 13.5 yards per reception, and nine touchdowns. He also recorded 3.5 tackles. The reason for the low total statistics is the fact that Burks returned to school, but was kept on the teams "availability list" as a precaution.

== Career statistics ==
Season			Receiving					Rushing					Tackles			Pass defense				Fumbles		Kick returns				
Year	Team	League	Rec	Yds	Avg	Lng.	TD	Att	Yds	Avg	Lng.	TD	Solo.	Asst.	Total	PB	Int.	Yds.	TD	FF	FR	Ret.	Yds.	Avg.	Lng	TD
1996	PHI	NFL	0	0	0.0	0	0	0	0	0	0	0	0	0	0	0	0	0	0	0	0	0	0	0	0	0
1998	RH	NFLE	13	109	8.4	--	2	0	0	0	0	0	0	0	0	0	0	0	0	0	0	0	0	0	0	0
1999	RH	NFLE	32	656	20.5	--	5	0	0	0	0	0	0	0	0	0	0	0	0	0	0	0	0	0	0	0
1999	CAR	NFL	0	0	0	0	0	0	0	0	0	0	0	0	0	0	0	0	0	0	0	0	0	0	0	0
2000	CAR	NFL	0	0	0	0	0	0	0	0	0	0	0	0	0	0	0	0	0	0	0	1	25	25.0	25	0
2001	OR	XFL	34	659	19.4	81	7	0	0	0	0	0	0	0	0	0	0	0	0	0	0	0	0	0	0	0
2001	OAK	NFL	--	--	--	--	--	--	--	--	--	--	--	--	--	--	--	--	--	--	--	--	--	--	--	--
2002	DAL	AFL	54	677	12.5	--	16	0	0	0	0	0	4	0	4	0	0	0	0	0	1	14	153	10.9	--	0
2003	DAL	AFL	102	1,221	12.0	--	28	4	-9	-2.3	--	0	2	3	5	1	0	0	0	0	0	10	82	8.2	--	0
2004	GA	AFL	73	1,075	14.7	--	18	0	0	0	0	0	18	15	33	8	2	38	1	0	0	6	61	10.2	--	0
2005	GA	AFL	16	180	11.3	--	0	1	-5	-5.0	-5	0	1	0	1	1	1	10	0	0	0	0	0	0	0	0
2005	GR	AFL	34	371	10.9	--	7	0	0	0	0	0	4	4	8	2	1	0	0	1	0	0	0	0	0	0
2006	DAL	AFL	92	1,130	12.3	--	29	7	20	2.9	--	2	16	6	22	1	4	24	0	1	1	6	42	7.0	--	1
2007	DAL	AFL	18	243	13.5	--	9	0	0	0	0	0	2	1	3	0	0	0	0	0	0	0	0	0	0	0
Career			468	6,321	13.5	--	121	12	6	0.5	--	2	47	29	76	13	8	72	1	2	2	37	363	9.8	--	1

== Coaching career ==
While playing in the Arena Football League, Burks served as an assistant coach at Hopewell High School in 2002, and Berkmar High School from 2004 to 2005. Then he became the wide receivers' coach for LaGrange College from 2006 until 2009. In 2008, while at LaGrange College, he also became the special teams and Fullback / linebacker coach for the Georgia Force in 2008. In 2010, he became an assistant coach at Troup High School. He then returned to LaGrange High School as an assistant coach from 2011 until 2012. On January 16, 2013, he was hired by Lafayette High School as athletic director and head coach in Lafayette, Alabama. In 2014, he became head coach at his alma mater LaGrange High School. In the winter of 2021, he became the head coach of the Warner University football team.

== Personal life ==
Throughout his professional career, Burks has helped support the community he played in. During his first stint with the Desperados, he served as a celebrity guest coach at the Dallas Cowboys Let Us Play! Sports Camp for underprivileged girls. He and wife Patricia have two daughters, Kennedy and Payton, and two sons, Dialleo Jr. and Kameron.

== Head coaching record ==
Year	Team	Overall	Conference	Standing	Bowl/playoffs
Warner Royals (Sun Conference) (2022–present)
2022	Warner	1–9	0–6	7th	
2023	Warner	4–6	1–6	T–7th	
2024	Warner	0–8	0–6	8th	
2025	Warner	2–8	2–5	T–6th	
2026	Warner	0–0	0–0		
Warner:		7–31	3–23		
Total:		7–31			

== See also ==
- List of Arena Football League and National Football League players
