= Pat Barnes =

American football player (born 1975)

No. 14, 10, 18
- Position: Quarterback

Personal information
- Born: February 23, 1975 (age 51); Arlington Heights, Illinois, U.S.
- Listed height: 6 ft 3 in (1.91 m)
- Listed weight: 215 lb (98 kg)

Career information
- High school: Trabuco Hills (Mission Viejo, California)
- College: California (1993–1996)
- NFL draft: 1997: 4th round, 110th overall pick

Career history
- Kansas City Chiefs (1997–1998); Washington Redskins (1998)*; Oakland Raiders (1998–1999); → Frankfurt Galaxy (1999); San Francisco 49ers (1999); → Frankfurt Galaxy (2000); New Orleans Saints (2000)*; San Francisco Demons (2001); Calgary Stampeders (2001); Winnipeg Blue Bombers (2002); Cleveland Browns (2003)*; Winnipeg Blue Bombers (2003)
- * Offseason or practice squad member only

Awards and highlights
- Grey Cup champion (2001); World Bowl champion (1999); Second-team All-Pac-10 (1996)

Career NFL statistics
- TD–INT: 0-0
- Passing yards: 0
- Passer rating: 0
- Stats at Pro Football Reference

Patrick M. Barnes (born February 23, 1975) is an American former professional football player who was a quarterback in the National Football League (NFL), XFL, and Canadian Football League (CFL). He played college football for the California Golden Bears, becoming one of the most prolific quarterbacks in program history, and was selected by the Kansas City Chiefs in the fourth round of the 1997 NFL draft. Barnes played professionally from 1997 to 2003.

== College career ==
Barnes played college football at the University of California, Berkeley, where he emerged as one of the most productive quarterbacks in school history. He served as the primary backup to Dave Barr during the 1993 season, but following an injury to Barr and a midseason three-game losing streak, Barnes was pressed into action and made his first career start against Arizona State, burning his redshirt in the process.

Entering the 1994 season, Barnes was again expected to serve as Barr’s backup, but injuries once more forced him into extended playing time. He started the final three games of the season, highlighted by a victory over rival Stanford in the season finale that helped stabilize the program.

Barnes became Cal’s full-time starter in 1995 and held the role through his senior season in 1996. Under head coach Steve Mariucci during the 1996 season, Barnes operated in Mariucci’s version of the West Coast offense and earned a reputation as a poised distributor who spread the ball effectively and excelled throwing on the run. During the season, he attempted 420 passes, set a then–Pac-10 record for touchdown passes, and posted a 31–8 touchdown-to-interception ratio. A signature performance came against Arizona in a four-overtime game, when Barnes threw for 503 yards and eight touchdown passes, tying a conference record. His overall performance earned him second-team All-Pac-10 honors, finishing behind Jake Plummer.

Barnes concluded his collegiate career as one of the most accomplished quarterbacks in Cal history, setting multiple single-season and career records and leading the Golden Bears to a bowl appearance. He capped his career by appearing in the 1996 Senior Bowl, where he threw three touchdown passes and was named the game’s Most Valuable Player, though the performance was marred by a broken right wrist sustained during the game.

=== Statistics ===
Season	Team	Games			Passing								Rushing			
Season	Team	GP	GS	Record	Cmp	Att	Pct	Yds	Y/A	TD	Int	Rtg	Att	Yds	Avg	TD
1993	California	4	1	0–1	10	33	30.3	125	3.8	0	3	43.9	4	-8	-2.0	0
1994	California	4	3	1–2	65	97	67.0	738	7.6	3	4	132.9	25	-107	-4.3	0
1995	California	11	11	3–8	197	362	54.4	2,685	7.4	17	11	126.1	56	-160	-2.9	1
1996	California	11	11	6–5	250	420	59.5	3,499	8.3	31	8	150.1	86	-83	-1.0	1
Regular season		30	26	10–16	522	912	57.2	7,047	7.7	51	26	134.9	171	-358	-2.1	2
Bowl games		1	1	0–1	27	38	71.1	313	8.2	3	0	166.3	8	-1	-0.1	0

Bowl games only began counting toward single-season and career statistics in 2002.

- 1996 Aloha Bowl – 27/38, 313 yards, 3 TD. Eight rushes for (-1)

== Professional career ==
=== Kansas City Chiefs ===
Barnes was selected by the Kansas City Chiefs in the fourth round (110th overall) of the 1997 NFL draft, joining his collegiate teammate Tony Gonzalez. He did not appear in a game during the 1997 season and was listed third on the depth chart. During the following offseason, the organization sought to assign Barnes to NFL Europe, but he declined and remained with the Chiefs through offseason activities. He was released on August 25, 1998, following the fourth preseason game, after Kansas City signed Todd Collins.

=== Washington Redskins ===
On September 9, 1998, Barnes was signed to the Washington Redskins practice squad. He was released six days later, on September 15, 1998.

=== Oakland Raiders ===
Barnes signed with the Oakland Raiders on September 15, 1998. He was elevated to the active roster on multiple occasions but did not appear in a regular-season game during the 1998 season. Following the season, he was allocated to the Frankfurt Galaxy of NFL Europe.

The Galaxy employed a two-quarterback system featuring Barnes and Jake Delhomme, nicknamed the “Double-Headed Quarterback Monster.” Delhomme typically started games, while Barnes played the second and fourth quarters. During the 1999 season, Barnes threw for 1,468 yards, 12 touchdowns, and eight interceptions. In the World Bowl '99, he completed 12 of 16 passes for 204 yards and three touchdowns, including three scoring passes to Andy McCullough, leading Frankfurt to a 38–24 victory over the Barcelona Dragons. Upon returning to the Raiders, Barnes was released on September 4, 1999, during final preseason roster cuts.

=== San Francisco 49ers ===
On October 1, 1999, Barnes signed with the San Francisco 49ers, reuniting with former collegiate head coach Steve Mariucci. He served as the third-string quarterback behind Jeff Garcia and Steve Stenstrom. After a 3–8 start to the season, Mariucci indicated that Barnes would receive playing time later in the season. He made his NFL debut in Week 14 against the Atlanta Falcons, appearing in the 26–7 victory but not recording any statistics. After the season, he was again assigned to the Frankfurt Galaxy.

=== New Orleans Saints ===
Barnes returned to Frankfurt for the 2000 NFL Europe season and served as the team’s primary starting quarterback, while also splitting time with Ted White. He completed 138 of 250 passes for 1,954 yards, 18 touchdowns, and 10 interceptions. At the conclusion of the season, Barnes became the league’s all-time passing touchdowns leader with 30. His performance earned him a contract with the New Orleans Saints, who signed him on June 29, 2000. He participated in training camp but was released on July 31, 2000.

=== San Francisco Demons ===
On October 28, 2000, Barnes was claimed by the San Francisco Demons of the XFL through territorial protection. He initially served as the backup to fellow Cal alumnus Mike Pawlawski, but assumed a larger role once Pawlawski was injured. In Week 5 against the Birmingham Thunderbolts, Barnes made his first Demons start, completing 10 of 17 passes for 100 yards and two touchdowns, while also rushing for a touchdown. His performance helped San Francisco post a season-high 39 points in a 39–10 victory.

Barnes started the following week against the New York/New Jersey Hitmen but was unable to secure a win. He returned to a backup role until Pawlawski suffered an injury in the final regular-season game, prompting Barnes to start in the semifinal matchup against the Orlando Rage. In a 26–25 victory, he completed 16 of 26 passes for 181 yards with two interceptions and added two rushing touchdowns, sending the Demons to the championship game. In the title game, Barnes replaced Pawlawski in the second half when the outcome was out of reach. He completed two of five passes for 26 yards with one interception but was injured during the contest and replaced by Oteman Sampson.

=== Calgary Stampeders ===
In September 2001, Barnes signed with the Calgary Stampeders of the CFL. Serving as a backup to Marcus Crandell and Ben Sankey, he saw limited playing time, appearing in eight games and completing 2 of 3 passes for 25 yards. Barnes was part of the Stampeders roster that won the Grey Cup that season, earning his second professional championship following his 1999 World Bowl victory with the Frankfurt Galaxy.

=== Winnipeg Blue Bombers ===
On January 15, 2002, Barnes was traded to the Winnipeg Blue Bombers for future considerations. He spent the 2002 season as the second-string quarterback behind Khari Jones, dressing for all 18 games and completing 17 of 25 passes for 210 yards and one touchdown. On January 10, 2003, he signed with the Cleveland Browns but was released on June 5, 2003. He subsequently re-signed with Winnipeg for the 2003 season. In Week 18 against the Edmonton Eskimos, Barnes received his first CFL start due to Jones suffering a high ankle sprain. He started again in the season finale, also against Edmonton, but sustained a significant knee injury in the first half. He was released at the conclusion of the season on December 8, 2003, and retired from professional football the following day.

== Professional career statistics ==
NFL

Year	Team	Games			Passing								Rushing			
Year	Team	GP	GS	Record	Cmp	Att	Pct	Yds	Y/A	TD	Int	Rtg	Att	Yds	Y/A	TD
1997	KC	0	0	—	DNP											
1998	OAK	0	0	—	DNP											
1999	SF	1	0	—												
Career		1	0	0–0	0	0	-	0	-	0	0	-	0	0	0	0

NFLE

Year	Team	Games			Passing								Rushing			
Year	Team	GP	GS	Record	Cmp	Att	Pct	Yds	Y/A	TD	Int	Rtg	Att	Yds	Avg	TD
1999	Frankfurt	10	2	0–2	94	164	57.3	1,468	9.0	12	8	91.2	22	107	4.9	1
2000	Frankfurt	9	9	4–5	138	250	55.2	1,954	7.8	18	10	88.0	16	72	4.5	2
Career		19	11	4–7	232	414	56.0	3,422	8.3	30	18	89.3	38	179	4.7	3

XFL

Year	Team	Games			Passing								Rushing			
Year	Team	GP	GS	Record	Cmp	Att	Pct	Yds	Y/A	TD	Int	Rtg	Att	Yds	Avg	TD
2001	SF	4	2	1–1	36	80	45.0	379	4.7	3	2	61.4	11	39	3.5	1
Career		4	2	1–1	36	80	45.0	379	4.7	3	2	61.4	11	39	3.5	1

CFL

Year	Team	Games			Passing								Rushing			
Year	Team	GP	GS	Record	Cmp	Att	Pct	Yds	Y/A	TD	Int	Rtg	Att	Yds	Y/A	TD
2001	CGY	8	0	—	2	3	66.7	25	8.3	0	0	92.4	0	0	0.0	0
2002	WPG	18	0	—	17	26	65.4	210	8.1	1	0	103.0	6	29	4.8	0
2003	WPG	13	2	1–1	28	67	41.8	412	6.1	3	2	65.0	4	8	2.0	0
Career		39	2	1–1	47	96	49.0	647	6.7	4	2	0.0	10	37	3.7	0
