= Ricky Bell (defensive back) =

American gridiron football player (1974–2011)

- Bell, circa 2002

No. 42, 32, 30, 24, 26, 25, 20, 37, 7, 18
- Positions: Cornerback, defensive halfback

Personal information
- Born: October 2, 1974; Columbia, South Carolina, U.S.
- Died: February 17, 2011 (aged 36); Columbia, South Carolina, U.S.

Career information
- High school: Eau Claire (Columbia)
- College: NC State (1992–1995)
- NFL draft: 1996: undrafted

Career history
- Pittsburgh Steelers (1996); Jacksonville Jaguars (1996); Chicago Bears (1997–1998); → Barcelona Dragons (1999); Orlando Rage (2001); Calgary Stampeders (2001); Ottawa Renegades (2002); Winnipeg Blue Bombers (2002–2004); Montreal Alouettes (2005–2006); Edmonton Eskimos (2007)*; Dallas Desperados (2008)*; Georgia Force (2008)
- * Offseason or practice squad member only

Awards and highlights
- Grey Cup champion (2001); Intergold CFLPA All-Star (2001); All-NFL Europe (1999)
- Stats at Pro Football Reference
- Stats at ArenaFan.com

Richard Bell Jr. (October 2, 1974 – February 17, 2011) was an American professional football player who was a defensive back in the National Football League (NFL), Canadian Football League (CFL), NFL Europe, XFL, and Arena Football League (AFL) from 1996 to 2008. He played college football for the NC State Wolfpack, and was a three-year starter. He skipped his senior year to enter the 1996 NFL draft.

Bell played in the NFL with the Jacksonville Jaguars and Chicago Bears; in the CFL with the Calgary Stampeders, Ottawa Renegades, Winnipeg Blue Bombers, and Montreal Alouettes; in NFL Europe with the Barcelona Dragons; in the XFL with the Orlando Rage; and in the AFL with the Georgia Force. He earned CFL All-Star honors in 2001 as Calgary won the 89th Grey Cup. He also started for the Alouettes in the 93rd Grey Cup and 94th Grey Cup. Bell garnered All-NFL Europe recognition in 1999.

== Early life ==
Richard Bell Jr. was born on October 2, 1974, in Columbia, South Carolina. He played high school football at Eau Claire High School in Columbia, earning all-state honors as a senior. He played in the North Carolina–South Carolina All-Star Football Classic. Bell was also a three-year letterman in basketball.

== College career ==
Bell enrolled at North Carolina State University to play college football for the Wolfpack. He redshirted the 1992 season. He was then a three-year letterman and three-year starter from 1993 to 1995. He played every secondary position while at NC state. On August 20, 1995, Bell was one of four Wolfpack football players who were arrested for breaking and entering into a NC State basketball player's apartment. Bell pleaded guilty to trespassing and was sentenced to 75 hours of community service. He started all 11 games as a team captain at weakside cornerback his junior year in 1995, posting 47 solo tackles, 14 assisted tackles, six pass breakups, and one interception. He recorded four interceptions for 72 yards during his college career. He skipped his senior year, declaring for the 1996 NFL draft.

== Professional career ==
=== Pittsburgh Steelers ===
Bell said the NFL Draft Advisory Board told him he would be a mid-round draft pick. He was not able to run at the 1996 NFL Combine due to contracting the flu. After going undrafted in the 1996 NFL draft, Bell signed with the Pittsburgh Steelers on April 29. Green Bay Packers general manager Ron Wolf said that a borderline player such as Bell should have stayed in school. He was released on August 24 and then signed to the practice squad. He was promoted to the active roster on September 10, following the second game of the 1996 regular season. Bell did not play in any games for the Steelers and was waived on September 24, 1996.

=== Jacksonville Jaguars ===
Bell was claimed off waivers by the Jacksonville Jaguars on September 25, 1996. He played in the remaining 12 regular season games for the Jaguars as a reserve cornerback. He totaled two solo tackles on defense, one assisted tackle on defense, 14 special teams tackles, six kick returns for 119 yards, and one fumble. Bell also appeared in all three playoff game for Jacksonville, returning one kick for 25 yards. He was released on August 19, 1997, after the third of four preseason games.

=== Chicago Bears ===
Bell signed with the Chicago Bears on September 9, 1997, after the second game of the regular season. He played in the next five games for the Bears on special teams. He was placed on the non-football injury list on October 25 due to an undisclosed ailment. In 1998, Bell was listed as the backup right cornerback behind starter Walt Harris. On November 15, 1998, against the Detroit Lions, on 4th-and-43, Bell was penalized for roughing the punter. He appeared in 14 games, mostly on special teams, during the 1998 season, recording one fumble recovery and three solo tackles on defense.

In February 1999, the Bears allocated Bell to NFL Europe to play for the Barcelona Dragons. He was the starting left cornerback for the Dragons during the 1999 NFL Europe season. He played in all ten games while posting 41 tackles on defense, five pass breakups, and two kick returns for 37 yards. Bell's 41 tackles were the second-most on the team behind linebacker Mike Maslowski. The Dragons went 7–3 and advanced to World Bowl '99, where they lost to the Frankfurt Galaxy by a score of 38–24. Bell earned All-NFL Europe honors for his performance during the 1999 season. He was released by the Bears on September 5, 1999, before the start of the NFL regular season.

=== Orlando Rage ===
In October 2000, Bell was one of the players chosen in the first and only draft of the newly-formed XFL. He was selected by the Orlando Rage in the fifth round of the draft, with the 36th overall pick. Bell played in eight games during the 2001 XFL season as a backup cornerback, accumulating 13 solo tackles and one assisted tackle. The league folded after the 2001 season.

=== Calgary Stampeders ===
Bell signed with the Calgary Stampeders of the Canadian Football League (CFL) on May 17, 2001. Prior to the season opener against the Winnipeg Blue Bombers on July 4, 2001, the Winnipeg Sun noted that Bell would likely to tasked with defending Winnipeg's star receiver Milt Stegall. Bell started all 18 games for the Stampeders in 2001 at defensive halfback, totaling 45 defensive tackles, one special teams tackle, two sacks, one interception, and seven pass breakups. The Stampeders finished the regular season with an 8–10 record but earned a berth in the 89th Grey Cup after winning two playoff games. On November 24, Bell was named to the Intergold CFLPA All-Star team for the 2001 season. In the Grey Cup on November 25, Calgary beat the 14–4 Blue Bombers by a score of 27–19, becoming the second team in league history to win the Grey Cup despite having a losing record.

=== Ottawa Renegades ===
On January 17, 2002, Bell was selected by the Ottawa Renegades in the second round of the 2002 CFL expansion draft. The Stampeders left Bell unprotected in the draft, with Calgary's head coach/general manager Wally Buono saying it was a tough choice. Bell, who owned a cell phone store and barber shop in Columbia, South Carolina, was unsure if he was going to continue playing in the CFL. The Calgary Herald said Bell had taken a "beating" on the conversion of Canadian dollars to American dollars. Bell said he would have to talk to Renegades general manager Eric Tillman about his contract. Bell signed a new contract with the Renegades in May 2002. He was a starter for the Renegades during the 2002 season, appearing in 15 games while posting 30 defensive tackles, one special teams tackle, one interception, and one pass breakup. In October 2001, Bell wrote a letter to the Renegades requesting that they give him a better contract or allow him to play in the Arena Football League (AFL) during the CFL offseason in order to boost his income. He said his level of intensity on the field would not be as high if he continued playing for the Renegades. Ottawa turned down his request, citing risk of injury, fatigue, and the potential of similar requests from other players.

=== Winnipeg Blue Bombers ===
On October 16, 2002, ahead of the CFL trade deadline, the Renegades traded Bell to the Blue Bombers for the negotiation rights to Canadian NFL kicker Steve Christie and free agent quarterback Dameyune Craig. Winnipeg starting defensive back Tyrone Bell had recently suffered an injury. Ricky did not start in place of Tyrone but ended up playing in the final three games of the 2001 season for the Blue Bombers, recording ten defensive tackles, one interception, and one pass breakup. Bell started all 18 games for Winnipeg in 2003 as a cornerback/defensive halfback, totaling 48 defensive tackles, two special teams tackles, six pass breakups, one interception for ten yards, and one punt return for six yards. The team went 11–7 and lost in the Western semi-final to the Saskatchewan Roughriders.

Bell started all 18 games at defensive halfback in 2004, recording 44 defensive tackles, three special teams tackles, one interception for 39 yards, four pass breakups, one forced fumble, and one fumble recovery that he returned 28 yards for a touchdown. The Blue Bombers finished the 2004 season with a 7–11 record, missing the playoffs. He held out of training camp in 2005 under "mysterious circumstances". Bell, who was scheduled to make $90,000 CAD in 2005, reportedly wanted a new contract and a $20,000 signing bonus or he would retire. Bell said the money was not the only issue, claiming he was disrespected by management.

=== Montreal Alouettes ===
On September 29, 2005, Bell was traded to the Montreal Alouettes for Canadian linebacker Ryan Folk. The Gazette said that Bell would report to the team on October 3 and was expected to be activated two weeks later, giving him time to get into shape. In 2006, The Gazette said the Bell trade was "one of the great thefts of CFL history". He made his Alouettes debut on October 16, 2005, against the BC Lions, starting at weakside cornerback. He played in the final four games of the season for the Alouettes, posting 16 defensive tackles, one special teams tackle, one sack, and three pass breakups. On November 10, Bell who was set to become a free agent in 2006,, signed a new three-year contract (two years plus an option) with Montreal. He started for the Alouettes in the 93rd Grey Cup on November 27, 2005, losing to the Edmonton Eskimos by a margin of 38–35.

Bell arrived late at training camp in 2006 due to personal reasons. He played in 17 games, all starts, at defensive halfback for the Alouettes in 2006, recording 49 defensive tackles, three special teams tackles, three pass breakups, one sack, one forced fumble, and one fumble recovery. The Alouettes went 10–8 and made it to the 94th Grey Cup against the BC Lions. Bell said he was considering retirement if Montreal won the Grey Cup. He started in the Grey Cup but the Alouettes lost 25–14. Bell was released by the team in February 2007 during salary cuts.

=== Edmonton Eskimos ===
Bell signed with the Edmonton Eskimos on March 27, 2007. Bell said he took a pay cut to sign with Edmonton, stating that he wanted to win another championship. The Eskimos wanted him to play linebacker, with head coach Danny Maciocia saying "Our Sam (strongside) linebacker is clearly a guy who can play the run when the opposition lines up with two running backs, but he has to have the ability to cover when they're in a five-receiver set. Ricky is a physical player with excellent cover skills. So we want to bring him to camp and see how he looks there." Bell was later the first cut during Eskimo training camp on June 7, 2007, in favor of linebackers Ray Perryman and Siddeeq Shabazz. After his release, Bell said he had not been comfortable at linebacker, and that "Maybe [he was] done."

=== Arena Football League ===
On June 13, 2007, Bell signed with the Dallas Desperados of the Arena Football League (AFL) for the 2008 AFL season as a defensive back. He was waived on November 30, 2007.

Bell was signed by the AFL's Georgia Force on March 20, 2008, three weeks into the regular season. He posted 11 solo tackles, three assisted tackles, and two pass breakups for the Force before being waived on April 11, 2008.

== Personal life ==
Bell worked in real estate after his football career. He died on February 17, 2011, in Columbia, South Carolina. His family did not reveal the cause. He had one daughter.
