= Barry Cantrell =

American football player (born 1976)

No. 10
- Position: Punter

Personal information
- Born: November 2, 1976 (age 50); Margate, Florida, U.S.
- Listed height: 6 ft 1 in (1.85 m)
- Listed weight: 195 lb (88 kg)

Career information
- High school: St. Thomas Aquinas (Fort Lauderdale, Florida)
- College: Fordham (1994–1997)
- NFL draft: 1998: undrafted

Career history
- Philadelphia Eagles (1998)*; Frankfurt Galaxy (1999); Dallas Cowboys (2000)
- * Offseason or practice squad member only

Awards and highlights
- First-team All-American (1998); Atlantic 10 Indoor Championships record 7' 1.75" high jump; World Bowl champion (1999); Fordham Hall of Fame (Class of 2004)

Career NFL statistics
- Punts: 10
- Punt yards: 367
- Avg.: 36.7
- Net yards: 333
- Net.: 33.3
- Inside 20: 3
- Long: 40
- Stats at Pro Football Reference

Barry L. Cantrell II (born November 2, 1976) is an American former professional football player who was a punter in the National Football League (NFL). He played college football for the Fordham Rams. He was signed as an undrafted free agent by the NFL's Philadelphia Eagles.

He also played for the Frankfurt Galaxy of NFL Europe and the Dallas Cowboys of the NFL.

== College career ==
While at Fordham, Cantrell earned Academic All-American honors as well as being named the Patriot League Scholar Athlete of the Year in football in 1996 and 1997.

=== Football ===
In 1997, as a senior, he was named Associated Press First-team All-American when he set a school record of 45.8 yards-per-punt average, which also let NCAA I-AA. He also set a school record in yards (2,890), which stood for eight years, before being broken by Anthony DiFino. He was also named First-team Burger King All-American and Second-team All-American by the Sports Network. When he graduated, he held numerous school records including career punts (267), career punting yardage (10,649), and career average (39.9). He also held the Patriot League record for season and career averages.

In 2001, he was named to the Patriot League 15th Anniversary team, and in 2011 to the 25th Anniversary team.

=== Track and field ===
As a senior, Cantrell won the 1998 Atlantic 10 Indoor Championships high jump competition, as well as recording a meet record jump of 7' 1.75", a still standing record (as of March 25, 2020). He also earned 1998 Indoor All-American honors by finishing 11th at the NCAA National Championships.

== Professional career ==
Cantrell when undrafted in the 1998 NFL draft by the Philadelphia Eagles of the National Football League (NFL). He was then assigned to the Frankfurt Galaxy of NFL Europe. While playing for the Galaxy, he punted 39 times, for 1,602 yards, with an average of 41.1 yards, and a long of 58 yards. He helped the team finish 6-4 and win the World Bowl championship. He then joined the Dallas Cowboys in 2000 and appeared in two games.

== Personal life ==
After leaving football, Cantrell returned to Florida and served as a financial advisor for Bernstein Investment Research & Management, before moving on to become the director of financial planning for Edelman Financial Engines.
