= Na'il =

Na'il is a given name. Notable people with the name include:

- Na'il Benjamin (born 1974), American football player
- Na'il Diggs (born 1978), American football player
