= Ben Fricke =

American football player (1975–2011)

No. 69, 66
- Position: Center

Personal information
- Born: November 13, 1975; Austin, Texas, U.S.
- Died: February 21, 2011 (aged 35); Plano, Texas, U.S.
- Listed height: 6 ft 0 in (1.83 m)
- Listed weight: 280 lb (127 kg)

Career information
- High school: Anderson (Austin)
- College: Houston
- NFL draft: 1998: 7th round, 213th overall pick

Career history
- New York Giants (1998)*; Amsterdam Admirals (1999); Dallas Cowboys (1999–2001); San Francisco 49ers (2002)*
- * Offseason or practice squad member only

Awards and highlights
- First-team All-American (1997); 2× First-team All-C-USA (1996, 1997)

Career NFL statistics
- Games played: 19
- Games started: 5
- Stats at Pro Football Reference

Benjamin Todd Fricke (November 13, 1975 – February 21, 2011) was an American professional football center in the National Football League (NFL) for the Dallas Cowboys. He also was a member of the Amsterdam Admirals in NFL Europe. He played college football at the University of Houston.

== Early life ==
Fricke attended Anderson High School, where he was an All-district selection on both offense and defense as a sophomore and junior.

As a senior, he was switched to center and was the team's punter. He also practiced track.

== College career ==
Fricke received a football scholarship from the University of Houston to play as a defensive lineman. As a freshman, he was moved to center.

He became a four-year starter and was named All-American as a senior, when he did not allow a sack.

== Professional career ==
=== New York Giants ===
Fricke was selected by the New York Giants in the seventh round (213th overall) of the 1998 NFL draft, after dropping because he was considered undersized for the position. He was waived on August 23.

=== Amsterdam Admirals ===
In 1999, he was selected by the Amsterdam Admirals in the 11th round of the NFL Europe draft. He was the starter at center, helping running back David Thompson finish fourth in the league with 503 rushing yards.

=== Dallas Cowboys ===
On August 3, 1999, he signed as a free agent with the Dallas Cowboys, to provide depth in training camp because of injuries. He was cut on September 22. He was re-signed on October 5. He was released on October 27 and signed to the practice squad the next day. He was promoted to the active roster on November 19. He appeared in 3 games and was declared inactive in 4 contests.

In 2000, he was declared inactive in 7 of the first 9 games. He started five games at center in place of Mark Stepnoski, who suffered a sprained MCL in his left knee in the eleventh game against the Baltimore Ravens.

In 2001, he was tried at long snapper during training camp to replace the recently released Dale Hellestrae, but remained as a backup at center, appearing in 7 games. He was cut on June 13, 2002.

=== San Francisco 49ers ===
In June 2002, he was signed by the San Francisco 49ers. He was released on August 8.

== Personal life ==
Fricke was the offensive coordinator and offensive line coach at Centennial High School for three years. On February 21, 2011, he died at the age of 35 from colon cancer.
