= 1999 Amsterdam Admirals season =

NFL Europe team season

- General manager: Bill Peterson
- Head coach: Al Luginbill
- Home stadium: Amsterdam ArenA

Results
- Record: 4–6
- Division place: 4th
- Playoffs: Did not qualify

The 1999 Amsterdam Admirals season was the fifth season for the franchise in the NFL Europe League (NFLEL). The team was led by head coach Al Luginbill in his fifth year, and played its home games at Amsterdam ArenA in Amsterdam, Netherlands. They finished the regular season in fourth place with a record of four wins and six losses.

== Offseason ==
=== NFL Europe League draft ===
1999 Amsterdam Admirals NFLEL draft selections
Draft order		Player name	Position	College
Round	Choice	Player name	Position	College
1	4	Shane Doyle	DE	Washington State
2	10	Clyde Johnson	CB	Kansas State
3	15	Jim Mills	T	Idaho
4	22	Cory Geason	TE	Tulane
5	27	Troy Bailey	DT	Oregon
6	34	Chris Wing	LB	Boise State
7	39	Derrick LeVake	T	Wisconsin–Whitewater
8	46	Rashee Johnson	CB	Arizona
9	51	Eric Anderson	T	Nebraska
10	58	Marcel Willis	LB	Ohio State
11	63	Ben Fricke	C	Houston
12	70	Clifford Green	CB	Tennessee State
13	75	Abu Wilson	RB	Utah State
14	82	John Fisher	S	Missouri Western State
15	87	LeShun Daniels	G	Ohio State
16	94	Tyrone Brown	WR	Toledo
17	99	James Kidd	WR	Colorado
18	106	Mike Ulufale	DT	Brigham Young
19	111	Lee Vaughn	CB	Wyoming
20	116	David Sanders	DE	Arkansas
21	119	Joe Aska	RB	Central Oklahoma
22	120	Scott Richards	TE	East Carolina

== Personnel ==
=== Staff ===
1999 Amsterdam Admirals staff
Front office: General Manager – Bill Peterson; Head coaches: Head Coach/Defensive Coordinator – Al Luginbill; Offensive coaches: Offensive Coordinator/Quarterbacks/Wide Receivers – Chris L. Allen; Running Backs – Dave Levy; Offensive Line – Al Tanara; National Coach/Offensive Assistant – Joost van den Bogert	Defensive coaches: Defensive Line – Jim Hilles; Defensive Assistant – Cedric Figaro; Strength and conditioning: Strength and Conditioning – Kirk Olson

=== Roster ===
1999 Amsterdam Admirals final roster
Quarterbacks: 12 Mike Cawley; 4 Dan Gonzalez; 11 Jim Kubiak; Running backs: 35 Joe Aska; 20 David Thompson; Wide receivers: 8 Joe Douglass; 15 Todd Doxzon (IR); 5 James Kidd; 1 Shawn McWashington; 2 Jason Shelley; Tight ends: 48 Matt Cushing; 88 Cory Geason; 87 Bob Rosenstiel	Offensive linemen: 75 Eric Anderson G; 61 Ben Fricke C; 67 Brad Kubik G; 74 Derrick LeVake T/G; 79 Dave Mudge T; 60 Fred Pollack G; 78 Daryl Terrell T; Defensive linemen: 93 Troy Bailey DT/DE; 94 Keith Council DT; 90 Shane Doyle DE; 95 Jon Kirksey DT; 92 David Sanders DT; 51 Chris Wing DE; 97 Glenn Young DE	Linebackers: 54 Louis Adams; 50 Bart Conley; 56 Dana Howard; 55 Jason Nevadomsky; 59 Myron Newsome; 46 Marcel Willis; Defensive backs: 25 Ray Jackson CB; 24 Clyde Johnson CB; 39 Rashee Johnson CB; 31 Carlos Jones CB; 40 Kelly Malveaux S; 21 Dexter Seigler CB; 28 Lee Vaughn S; 36 Greg Williams S	National players: 23 (Netherlands) Rey Agaoglu S; 86 (Finland) Sami Alalampi WR; 27 (Netherlands) Fabian Baldwin RB; 9 (Italy) Francesco Biancamano P/K; 14 (Netherlands) Silvio Diliberto K; 69 (Netherlands) Jeroen Egge C/G; 16 (Indonesia) Haroen Goelabdien QB; 57 (Japan) Masafumi Kawaguchi LB; 99 (Russia) Mikhail Sloutsky LB; 33 (Netherlands) Frank Temming RB; Rookies in italics

== Schedule ==
Week	Date	Kickoff (Note: All times local to where the game was played.)	Opponent	Results		Game site	Attendance
Week	Date	Kickoff	Opponent	Final score	Team record	Game site	Attendance
1	Saturday, April 17	8:00 p.m.	at Barcelona Dragons	L 16–28	0–1	Estadi Olímpic de Montjuïc	14,624
2	Saturday, April 24	7:00 p.m.	Frankfurt Galaxy	W 17–13	1–1	Amsterdam ArenA	14,568
3	Saturday, May 1	7:00 p.m.	at Rhein Fire	L 20–30	1–2	Rheinstadion	23,883
4	Saturday, May 8	7:00 p.m.	Berlin Thunder	W 49–23	2–2	Amsterdam ArenA	10,210
5	Saturday, May 15	7:00 p.m.	at Berlin Thunder	L 19–22 ^{OT}	2–3	Jahn-Sportpark	7,342
6	Saturday, May 22	7:00 p.m.	Rhein Fire	L 25–36	2–4	Amsterdam ArenA	14,056
7	Saturday, May 29	7:00 p.m.	Barcelona Dragons	L 17–28	2–5	Amsterdam ArenA	10,252
8	Saturday, June 5	7:00 p.m.	at Frankfurt Galaxy	L 14–21	2–6	Waldstadion	35,981
9	Sunday, June 13	3:00 p.m.	at Scottish Claymores	W 29–20	3–6	Hampden Park	10,415
10	Saturday, June 19	7:00 p.m.	Scottish Claymores	W 30–22	4–6	Amsterdam ArenA	12,358

== Standings ==
NFL Europe League
Team	W	L	T	PCT	PF	PA	Home	Road	STK
Barcelona Dragons	7	3	0	.700	263	246	4–1	3–2	W1
Frankfurt Galaxy	6	4	0	.600	239	223	3–2	3–2	L1
Rhein Fire	6	4	0	.600	286	149	3–2	3–2	W3
Amsterdam Admirals	4	6	0	.400	236	243	3–2	1–4	W2
Scottish Claymores	4	6	0	.400	270	298	2–3	2–3	L4
Berlin Thunder	3	7	0	.300	173	308	2–3	1–4	L3

== Game summaries ==
=== Week 1: at Barcelona Dragons ===
Week One: Amsterdam Admirals at Barcelona Dragons – Game summary

Quarter	1	2	3	4	Total
Amsterdam	0	3	0	13	16
Barcelona	0	0	14	14	28

at Estadi Olímpic de Montjuïc, Barcelona, Spain

- Date: Saturday, April 17
- Game time: 8:00 p.m. CEST
- Game attendance: 14,624

=== Week 2: vs Frankfurt Galaxy ===
Week Two: Frankfurt Galaxy at Amsterdam Admirals – Game summary

Quarter	1	2	3	4	Total
Frankfurt	3	0	10	0	13
Amsterdam	0	3	7	7	17

at Amsterdam ArenA, Amsterdam, Netherlands

- Date: Saturday, April 24
- Game time: 7:00 p.m. CEST
- Game attendance: 14,568

=== Week 3: at Rhein Fire ===
Week Three: Amsterdam Admirals at Rhein Fire – Game summary

Quarter	1	2	3	4	Total
Amsterdam	0	0	7	13	20
Rhein	14	3	10	3	30

at Rheinstadion, Düsseldorf, Germany

- Date: Saturday, May 1
- Game time: 7:00 p.m. CEST
- Game attendance: 23,883

=== Week 4: vs Berlin Thunder ===
Week Four: Berlin Thunder at Amsterdam Admirals – Game summary

Quarter	1	2	3	4	Total
Berlin	0	9	14	0	23
Amsterdam	14	14	14	7	49

at Amsterdam ArenA, Amsterdam, Netherlands

- Date: Saturday, May 8
- Game time: 7:00 p.m. CEST
- Game attendance: 10,210

=== Week 5: at Berlin Thunder ===
Week Five: Amsterdam Admirals at Berlin Thunder – Game summary

Quarter	1	2	3	4	OT	Total
Amsterdam	3	3	7	6	0	19
Berlin	0	0	7	12	3	22

at Jahn-Sportpark, Berlin, Germany

- Date: Saturday, May 15
- Game time: 7:00 p.m. CEST
- Game attendance: 7,342

=== Week 6: vs Rhein Fire ===
Week Six: Rhein Fire at Amsterdam Admirals – Game summary

Quarter	1	2	3	4	Total
Rhein	16	10	10	0	36
Amsterdam	3	13	0	9	25

at Amsterdam ArenA, Amsterdam, Netherlands

- Date: Saturday, May 22
- Game time: 7:00 p.m. CEST
- Game attendance: 14,056

=== Week 7: vs Barcelona Dragons ===
Week Seven: Barcelona Dragons at Amsterdam Admirals – Game summary

Quarter	1	2	3	4	Total
Barcelona	0	7	7	14	28
Amsterdam	7	3	7	0	17

at Amsterdam ArenA, Amsterdam, Netherlands

- Date: Saturday, May 29
- Game time: 7:00 p.m. CEST
- Game attendance: 10,252

=== Week 8: at Frankfurt Galaxy ===
Week Eight: Amsterdam Admirals at Frankfurt Galaxy – Game summary

Quarter	1	2	3	4	Total
Amsterdam	0	0	0	14	14
Frankfurt	0	14	0	7	21

at Waldstadion, Frankfurt, Germany

- Date: Saturday, June 5
- Game time: 7:00 p.m. CEST
- Game attendance: 35,981
- Referee: Kirk Dornan

=== Week 9: at Scottish Claymores ===
Week Nine: Amsterdam Admirals at Scottish Claymores – Game summary

Quarter	1	2	3	4	Total
Amsterdam	0	12	3	14	29
Scotland	7	3	3	7	20

at Hampden Park, Glasgow, Scotland

- Date: Sunday, June 13
- Game time: 3:00 p.m. BST
- Game attendance: 10,415

=== Week 10: vs Scottish Claymores ===
Week Ten: Scottish Claymores at Amsterdam Admirals – Game summary

Quarter	1	2	3	4	Total
Scotland	0	7	7	8	22
Amsterdam	6	7	3	14	30

at Amsterdam ArenA, Amsterdam, Netherlands

- Date: Saturday, June 19
- Game time: 7:00 p.m. CEST
- Game attendance: 12,358
