= Bob Bicknell =

American football player and coach (born 1969)

Northwestern Wildcats
- Title: Tight ends coach

Personal information
- Born: November 13, 1969 (age 56); Holliston, Massachusetts, U.S.

Career information
- Position: Tight ends coach

Career history
- Boston University (1993) Safeties coach; Boston University (1994) Running backs coach; Boston University (1995–1997) Linebackers coach; Frankfurt Galaxy (1998) Defensive line coach; Frankfurt Galaxy (1999) Offensive line coach; Berlin Thunder (2000) Offensive line coach; Berlin Thunder (2001–2003) Offensive coordinator & offensive line coach; Cologne Centurions (2004–2005) Offensive coordinator & offensive line coach; Temple (2006) Offensive line coach; Kansas City Chiefs (2007) Assistant offensive line coach; Kansas City Chiefs (2008) Offensive line coach; Kansas City Chiefs (2009) Tight ends coach; Buffalo Bills (2010–2011) Tight ends coach; Buffalo Bills (2012) Wide receivers coach; Philadelphia Eagles (2013–2015) Wide receivers coach; San Francisco 49ers (2016) Wide receivers coach; Baylor (2017) Wide receivers coach; Cincinnati Bengals (2018–2020) Wide receivers coach; New Orleans Saints (2022–2023) Senior offensive assistant; New England Patriots (2024) Tight ends coach; Las Vegas Raiders (2025) Senior offensive assistant; Northwestern (2026–present) Tight ends coach

Awards and highlights
- 3× World Bowl champion (VII, IX, X)

Robert Bicknell (born November 13, 1969) is an American football coach and former player who was most recently a senior offensive assistant for the Las Vegas Raiders of the National Football League (NFL). He recently was the tight ends coach for the New England Patriots. He also previously served as the senior offensive assistant for the New Orleans Saints from 2022 to 2023 and as the wide receivers coach for the Cincinnati Bengals from 2018 to 2020. Bicknell is the son of former Boston College head coach Jack Bicknell and the younger brother of Jack Bicknell, Jr., the current offensive line coach for Sam Houston.

== Playing career ==
Bicknell played college football at Boston College, where he was a two-year letterman at tight end from 1989 to 1990.

== Coaching career ==
=== Boston College ===
Bicknell began his coaching career at his alma mater Boston College where he would go in to coach safeties in 1993, running backs in 1994 and linebackers in 1995–1997.

=== NFL Europe ===
Bicknell joined the pro ranks in 1998 as the defensive line coach with the Frankfurt Galaxy of NFL Europe. The following season, he switched to the offensive side of the ball to coach the offensive line. During his two-year tenure in Frankfurt, the Galaxy reached the World Bowl final twice, winning the championship in 1999. During his time in Europe, Bicknell won three consecutive World Bowls as part of the coaching staff of the Frankfurt Galaxy 1999 and the Berlin Thunder 2000–2001. He was the offensive coordinator/offensive line coach for Berlin from 2001 to 2003 and followed it with two years in the same position for the Cologne Centurions.

=== Temple ===
Bicknell served as the offensive line coach at Temple University in 2006.

=== Kansas City Chiefs ===
Bicknell began coaching in the NFL with the Kansas City Chiefs in 2007 his initially served as the team's assistant offensive line coach before being promoted the next year to offensive line coach. In 2009 he was moved once more, then moving to coach tight ends.

=== Buffalo Bills ===
Bicknell was named tight ends coach for the Buffalo Bills on January 27, 2010. Following the departure of former wide receivers coach Stan Hixon to join Penn State's staff under new coach Bill O'Brien, Bicknell was named the Bills wide receivers coach. He was dismissed, along with the entire Bills coaching staff, on December 31, 2012.

=== Philadelphia Eagles ===
Bicknell spent 2013-2015 as the Philadelphia Eagles’s wide receivers coach in under Chip Kelly. During his tenure with the Eagles', their offense set franchise records in points, touchdowns, passing yards, completions and completion percentage.

=== San Francisco 49ers ===
In 2016 Bicknell followed Kelly to the 49ers after being fired from the Eagles.

=== Baylor Bears ===
Bicknell spent 2017 at Baylor, as a part of Matt Rhule's staff where he served as the team's wide receivers coach. With his help then sophomore Denzel Mims became one of only six WRs from Power Five schools to top 1000 yards.

=== Cincinnati Bengals ===
Bicknell was hired by the Cincinnati Bengals as their wide receivers coach on January 8, 2018.

Bicknell missed the team's weeks 10 and 11 games in 2020 against the Pittsburgh Steelers and Washington Football Team due to COVID-19 pandemic protocols.

=== New Orleans Saints ===
On March 15, 2022, Bicknell was hired by the New Orleans Saints as their senior offensive assistant. On January 16, 2024, it was announced that Saints head coach Dennis Allen had released three offensive staff members (including Bicknell).

=== New England Patriots ===
On February 19, 2024, Bicknell was hired by the New England Patriots as their tight ends coach under head coach Jerod Mayo.

=== Las Vegas Raiders ===
On February 11, 2025, the Las Vegas Raiders hired Bicknell to serve as a senior offensive assistant. On November 24, Bicknell and Chip Kelly were fired by the Raiders following the team's Week 12 loss to the Cleveland Browns.

=== Northwestern Wildcats ===
On January 2, 2026, Bicknell was hired to serve as the tight ends coach for Northwestern, reuniting with Chip Kelly.
