= 1999 Scottish Claymores season =

NFL Europe team season

- General manager: Will Wilson
- Head coach: Jim Criner
- Home stadium: Murrayfield Stadium; Hampden Park

Results
- Record: 4–6
- Division place: 5th
- Playoffs: Did not qualify

The 1999 Scottish Claymores season was the fifth season for the franchise in the NFL Europe League (NFLEL). The team was led by head coach Jim Criner in his fifth year, and played its home games at Murrayfield Stadium in Edinburgh (three) and Hampden Park in Glasgow, Scotland (two). They finished the regular season in fifth place with a record of four wins and six losses.

== Personnel ==
=== Staff ===
1999 Scottish Claymores staff
Front office: General manager – Will Wilson; Head coaches: Head Coach/offensive line – Jim Criner; Offensive coaches: Offensive coordinator/quarterbacks/Receivers – Vince Alcalde; Running Backs/tight ends – Thomas Coleman	Defensive coaches: Defensive coordinator/linebackers – Myrel Moore; Defensive line – Jim Tomsula; Defensive backs – Richard Kent; Special teams coaches: National Coach/special teams Coordinator – Mike Kenny

=== Roster ===
1999 Scottish Claymores final roster
Quarterbacks: 19 Ryan Clement; 2 Dameyune Craig; Running backs: 23 Jesse Haynes; 44 Jamie Reader; 22 Emory Smith; 33 Ben Snell; Wide receivers: 84 Kevin Drake; 1 Mike Jenkins; 83 Yo Murphy; 4 Donald Sellers; Tight ends: 88 Shonn Bell	Offensive linemen: 77 Pierre Brillant T; 68 Brandon Dyson C/G; 78 Adam Hernandez G/T; 79 Eric Moss G; 71 Nathan Parks G; 76 Barry Sims T; 67 Barry Stokes T; 72 Emmett Zitelli C; Defensive linemen: 90 Aaron DeLaTorre DT; 94 KeJaun DuBose DT; 97 Jim Hoffman DE; 92 Brad Keeney DT; 93 Emile Palmer DT; 99 Shatony Sargeant DE	Linebackers: 59 Alan Campos OLB; 50 Matt Finkes MLB; 53 Jon Hesse OLB; 56 Marchant Kenney OLB; 54 Ryan Olson MLB; 52 Terry Rice-Lockett OLB; 51 Bernard Russ OLB; Defensive backs: 43 Joey Eloms CB; 24 Clifford Ivory CB; 28 Denorse Mosley CB; 45 Steve Rosga S; 38 Joe Rowe S; 20 Cliff Shamburger CB; 39 Tony Watkins S; 27 Lee Wiggins S; Special teams: 5 Chris Dolan P	National players: 15 (Australia) Jon Ballantyne P; 75 (England) Jermaine Benoit DE; 21 (England) Rowelle Blenman CB; 89 (England) Jason Byworth WR; 81 (Scotland) Scott Couper WR; 11 (Scotland) Robert Grant K; 8 (England) Rob Hart K; 35 (Japan) Yasushi Horiguchi RB; 87 (Scotland) Graeme Reith WR; 91 (England) Tom Tovo DE; 12 (Japan) Haruhito Tsuji QB; 55 (Republic of Ireland) Emmett Waldron MLB; Rookies in italics

== Schedule ==
Week	Date	Kickoff (Note: All times are in Central European Summer Time (CEST).)	Opponent	Results		Game site	Attendance
Week	Date	Kickoff	Opponent	Final score	Team record	Game site	Attendance
1	Sunday, 18 April	4:00 p.m.	Rhein Fire	W 21–20	1–0	Murrayfield Stadium	9,086
2	Saturday, 24 April	7:00 p.m.	at Berlin Thunder	W 48–14	2–0	Jahn-Sportpark	9,817
3	Sunday, 2 May	4:00 p.m.	Frankfurt Galaxy	L 35–42 (OT)	2–1	Murrayfield Stadium	10,169
4	Sunday, 9 May	4:00 p.m.	Barcelona Dragons	W 31–21	3–1	Murrayfield Stadium	8,864
5	Saturday, 15 May	7:00 p.m.	at Rhein Fire	L 6–37	3–2	Rheinstadion	22,171
6	Saturday, 22 May	7:00 p.m.	at Frankfurt Galaxy	W 42–35	4–2	Waldstadion	33,915
7	Sunday, 30 May	4:00 p.m.	Berlin Thunder	L 10–28	4–3	Hampden Park	9,128
8	Sunday, 6 June	7:00 p.m.	at Barcelona Dragons	L 35–42	4–4	Estadi Olímpic de Montjuïc	10,687
9	Sunday, 13 June	4:00 p.m.	Amsterdam Admirals	L 20–29	4–5	Hampden Park	10,415
10	Saturday, 19 June	7:00 p.m.	at Amsterdam Admirals	L 22–30	4–6	Amsterdam ArenA	12,358

== Standings ==
NFL Europe League
Team	W	L	T	PCT	PF	PA	Home	Road	STK
Barcelona Dragons	7	3	0	.700	263	246	4–1	3–2	W1
Frankfurt Galaxy	6	4	0	.600	239	223	3–2	3–2	L1
Rhein Fire	6	4	0	.600	286	149	3–2	3–2	W3
Amsterdam Admirals	4	6	0	.400	236	243	3–2	1–4	W2
Scottish Claymores	4	6	0	.400	270	298	2–3	2–3	L4
Berlin Thunder	3	7	0	.300	173	308	2–3	1–4	L3

== Game summaries ==
=== Week 9: vs Amsterdam Admirals ===
Week Nine: Amsterdam Admirals at Scottish Claymores – Game summary

Quarter	1	2	3	4	Total
Amsterdam	0	12	3	14	29
Scotland	7	3	3	7	20

at Hampden Park, Glasgow, Scotland

- Date: Sunday, 13 June
- Game time: 3:00 p.m. BST
- Game attendance: 10,415

=== Week 10: at Amsterdam Admirals ===
Week Ten: Scottish Claymores at Amsterdam Admirals – Game summary

Quarter	1	2	3	4	Total
Scotland	0	7	7	8	22
Amsterdam	6	7	3	14	30

at Amsterdam ArenA, Amsterdam, Netherlands

- Date: Saturday, 19 June
- Game time: 7:00 p.m. CEST
- Game attendance: 12,358
