= 1999 Berlin Thunder season =

NFL Europe team season

- General manager: Michael Lang
- Head coach: Wes Chandler
- Home stadium: Jahn-Sportpark

Results
- Record: 3–7
- Division place: 6th
- Playoffs: Did not qualify

The 1999 Berlin Thunder season was the inaugural season for the franchise in the NFL Europe League (NFLEL). The team was led by head coach Wes Chandler, and played its home games at Jahn-Sportpark in Berlin, Germany. They finished the regular season in sixth place with a record of three wins and seven losses.

Although the Thunder replaced the England Monarchs for this season, the only player from the 1998 roster to return for the new team was outside linebacker Scott Fields.

== Personnel ==
=== Staff ===
1999 Berlin Thunder staff
Front office: General Manager – Michael Lang; Head coaches: Head Coach – Wes Chandler; Offensive coaches: Offensive Coordinator/Offensive Line – Bob Lord; Quarterbacks – Reggie Beverly; National Coach/Running Backs – Shuan Fatah	Defensive coaches: Defensive Coordinator/Linebackers – Steve Carson; Defensive Line – Dennis Danielson; Defensive Backs – Derrick Burroughs

=== Roster ===
1999 Berlin Thunder final roster
Quarterbacks: 12 Chuck Clements; 13 Chris Dittoe; 14 Ronnie McAda; 11 Andre Ware; Running backs: 45 Edwin Watson; 33 Justin Watson; Wide receivers: 86 Na'il Benjamin; 84 Mike Bowman; 80 Jim McElroy; 18 Anthony Rodgers; 8 Andre Rone; 15 Tyrone Taylor; Tight ends: 81 Isaac Curtis; 88 Marcus Hinton	Offensive linemen: 77 Mike Edwards T; 64 Greg Engel G/C; 52 Jason McEndoo C; 63 Derrick Turner G; 67 Brent Warren G; 76 T. J. Washington T; 70 Tashe Williams T; 68 Jon Zatechka T; Defensive linemen: 75 Jimmie Bell DE; 95 Craig Charles DT; 92 Jomo Cousins DE; 93 Curtis Eason DT; 90 Michael Mason DE; 79 Tony Plantin DT; 91 Henry Slay DT; 99 Israel Stanley DE; 97 Larry Townsend DT	Linebackers: 56 Sedric Clark OLB; 50 Scott Fields OLB; 54 Willie Rodgers OLB; 58 Vernon Strickland MLB; 55 Phillip Ward OLB; Defensive backs: 40 Israel Byrd CB; 28 Fredric Ford CB; 22 George Harris S; 20 Shino Prater CB; 24 Roderick Thomas S; 30 Tre Thomas S; 25 Vann Washington S; 21 John Williams CB; 27 Claudius Wright CB; Special teams: 2 David Akers K; 5 Charles Pierce P	National players: 87 (Germany) Olaf Fischer WR; 82 (Germany) Jörg Heckenbach WR; 94 (Germany) Vladimir Ilic DE; 96 (Germany) Hans Juhnke DT/DE; 9 (Germany) Axel Kruse K; 39 (Germany) Kim Kuci RB; 51 (Germany) Gunther Renner MLB; 59 (Turkey) Cuneyt Topcu OLB; 23 (Germany) Sebastian Tuch S; 26 (Germany) Alexander Uestuenel S; Rookies in italics

== Schedule ==
Week	Date	Kickoff (Note: All times are in Central European Summer Time (CEST).)	Opponent	Results		Game site	Attendance
Week	Date	Kickoff	Opponent	Final score	Team record	Game site	Attendance
1	Saturday, April 17	7:00 p.m.	at Frankfurt Galaxy	L 20–21	0–1	Waldstadion	30,127
2	Saturday, April 24	7:00 p.m.	Scottish Claymores	L 14–48	0–2	Jahn-Sportpark	9,817
3	Saturday, May 1	8:00 p.m.	at Barcelona Dragons	L 10–42	0–3	Estadi Olímpic de Montjuïc	9,685
4	Saturday, May 8	7:00 p.m.	at Amsterdam Admirals	L 23–49	0–4	Amsterdam ArenA	10,210
5	Saturday, May 15	7:00 p.m.	Amsterdam Admirals	W 22–19 ^{OT}	1–4	Jahn-Sportpark	7,342
6	Sunday, May 23	7:00 p.m.	Barcelona Dragons	W 27–20	2–4	Jahn-Sportpark	8,667
7	Sunday, May 30	4:00 p.m.	at Scottish Claymores	W 28–10	3–4	Hampden Park	9,128
8	Saturday, June 5	7:00 p.m.	Rhein Fire	L 0–29	3–5	Jahn-Sportpark	10,683
9	Sunday, June 13	3:00 p.m.	Frankfurt Galaxy	L 19–32	3–6	Jahn-Sportpark	10,783
10	Saturday, June 19	7:00 p.m.	at Rhein Fire	L 10–38	3–7	Rheinstadion	31,350

== Standings ==
NFL Europe League
Team	W	L	T	PCT	PF	PA	Home	Road	STK
Barcelona Dragons	7	3	0	.700	263	246	4–1	3–2	W1
Frankfurt Galaxy	6	4	0	.600	239	223	3–2	3–2	L1
Rhein Fire	6	4	0	.600	286	149	3–2	3–2	W3
Amsterdam Admirals	4	6	0	.400	236	243	3–2	1–4	W2
Scottish Claymores	4	6	0	.400	270	298	2–3	2–3	L4
Berlin Thunder	3	7	0	.300	173	308	2–3	1–4	L3

== Game summaries ==
=== Week 4: at Amsterdam Admirals ===
Week Four: Berlin Thunder at Amsterdam Admirals – Game summary

Quarter	1	2	3	4	Total
Berlin	0	9	14	0	23
Amsterdam	14	14	14	7	49

at Amsterdam ArenA, Amsterdam, Netherlands

- Date: Saturday, May 8
- Game time: 7:00 p.m. CEST
- Game attendance: 10,210

=== Week 5: vs Amsterdam Admirals ===
Week Five: Amsterdam Admirals at Berlin Thunder – Game summary

Quarter	1	2	3	4	OT	Total
Amsterdam	3	3	7	6	0	19
Berlin	0	0	7	12	3	22

at Jahn-Sportpark, Berlin, Germany

- Date: Saturday, May 15
- Game time: 7:00 p.m. CEST
- Game attendance: 7,342
