= Michael Batiste (American football) =

American football player (born 1970)

No. 68, 61
- Position: Guard / Defensive tackle

Personal information
- Born: December 24, 1970 (age 55); Beaumont, Texas, U.S.
- Listed height: 6 ft 3 in (1.91 m)
- Listed weight: 325 lb (147 kg)

Career information
- High school: West Brook (Beaumont)
- College: Tulane
- NFL draft: 1994: undrafted

Career history
- Dallas Cowboys (1994–1995); → Frankfurt Galaxy (1996); Washington Redskins (1997)*; Washington Redskins (1998); Barcelona Dragons (1999)
- * Offseason or practice squad member only

Awards and highlights
- Super Bowl champion (XXX)

Career NFL statistics
- Games played: 8
- Stats at Pro Football Reference

Michael Batiste (born December 24, 1970) is an American former professional football player who was a defensive tackle and offensive guard in the National Football League (NFL) for the Dallas Cowboys and Washington Redskins. He played college football for the Tulane Green Wave. He also was a member of the Frankfurt Galaxy and Barcelona Dragons in the World League of American Football (WLAF).

== Early life ==
Michael Batiste attended West Brook Senior High School, where he was an All-district selection in football as a senior (jersey 72). He also lettered in basketball and track as a 3-year letterman.

He accepted a football scholarship from Tulane University in New Orleans, Louisiana. He became a starter at defensive tackle (number 54) as a sophomore, posting 57 tackles (6 for loss) and 3 sacks. The next year, he started 9 games at defensive tackle, posting 42 tackles (5 for loss) and 4 sacks. As a senior he started 10 games, registering 40 tackles (3 for loss) and one sack, while playing left defensive end and defensive tackle.

== Professional career ==
=== Dallas Cowboys ===
Michael Batiste was signed as an undrafted free agent by the Dallas Cowboys after the 1994 NFL draft, to play defensive tackle. He was waived on August 23.

In 1995, he was re-signed and converted into an offensive guard during training camp. He switched back to play in 2 regular season games as a backup defensive lineman. He was a part of the Super Bowl XXX winning team.

In 1996, he was allocated to the Frankfurt Galaxy of the World League of American Football, to play on the offensive line. Although he could run block, he struggled in pass protection and was released on August 25.

=== Washington Redskins ===
On February 26, 1997, he was signed as a free agent by the Washington Redskins. He was cut on August 24.

After being out of football for a year working as a substitute teacher at Northwestern High School, he was signed as a free agent on February 11, 1998. He played mainly on special teams and briefly as an offensive guard against the Denver Broncos and Minnesota Vikings. He was released on October 20.

=== Barcelona Dragons ===
In 1999, Michael Batiste played for the Barcelona Dragons of NFL Europe.
