= Rhein Fire (NFL Europe) =

Former professional American football team in Germany

Logo

General information
- Founded: 1995
- Folded: 2007
- Stadium: Rheinstadion (1995–2002); Arena AufSchalke (2003–2004); LTU Arena (2005–2007)
- Headquartered: Düsseldorf, Germany (1995–2002, 2005–2007); Gelsenkirchen, Germany (2003–2004)
- Colors: Maroon, Black, Gold, White

League / conference affiliations
- World League of American Football (NFL Europe)

Championships
- World Bowls: 2: World Bowl VI (1998); World Bowl VIII (2000)

The Rhein Fire were a professional football team in the NFL Europe, formerly the World League of American Football. Established in Düsseldorf, Germany in 1995, the franchise resurrected the name of the former Birmingham Fire team which was active during the 1991–1992 WLAF seasons.

== History ==
The team was based in Düsseldorf (and early on the team was occasionally referred to in the U.S. as the Düsseldorf Fire), playing at the Rheinstadion until 2002. After the demolition of the Rheinstadion, the team moved to nearby Gelsenkirchen and played at Arena AufSchalke for the 2003 and 2004 seasons. The team returned to Düsseldorf for the 2005 season, playing at the newly constructed LTU Arena. The Fire would remain at the LTU Arena until NFL Europe's dissolution in 2007.

The Fire hosted the World Bowl a record five times: in 1999 and 2002 at the Rheinstadion, in 2004 at Arena AufSchalke, and in 2005 and 2006 at the LTU Arena.

The Fire were one of NFL Europe's most successful teams in terms of fan support and on-field success. The team itself played for five World Bowl championships throughout its history, winning in 1998 over the Frankfurt Galaxy and 2000 over the Scottish Claymores. They lost to the Barcelona Dragons in 1997, the Berlin Thunder in 2002, and the Galaxy in 2003.

== Season-by-season ==
| Season | League | Regular season | | | | | Postseason | | | |
| Season | League | Won | Lost | Ties | Win % | Finish | Won | Lost | Win % | Result |
|---|---|---|---|---|---|---|---|---|---|---|
| 1995 | WLAF | 4 | 6 | 0 | .400 | 5th (League) | – | – | — | — |
| 1996 | WLAF | 3 | 7 | 0 | .300 | 6th (League) | – | – | — | — |
| 1997 | WLAF | 7 | 3 | 0 | .700 | 1st (League) | 0 | 1 | .000 | Lost to Barcelona Dragons in World Bowl '97 |
| 1998 | NFLE | 7 | 3 | 0 | .700 | 2nd (League) | 1 | 0 | 1.000 | World Bowl '98 champions |
| 1999 | NFLE | 6 | 4 | 0 | .600 | 3rd (League) | – | – | — | — |
| 2000 | NFLE | 7 | 3 | 0 | .700 | 1st (League) | 1 | 0 | 1.000 | World Bowl 2000 champions |
| 2001 | NFLE | 5 | 5 | 0 | .500 | 3rd (League) | – | – | — | — |
| 2002 | NFLE | 7 | 3 | 0 | .700 | 1st (League) | 0 | 1 | .000 | Lost to Berlin Thunder in World Bowl X |
| 2003 | NFLE | 6 | 4 | 0 | .600 | 2nd (League) | 0 | 1 | .000 | Lost to Frankfurt Galaxy in World Bowl XI |
| 2004 | NFLE | 3 | 7 | 0 | .300 | 5th (League) | – | – | — | — |
| 2005 | NFLE | 3 | 7 | 0 | .300 | 6th (League) | – | – | — | — |
| 2006 | NFLE | 6 | 4 | 0 | .600 | 3rd (League) | – | – | — | — |
| 2007 | NFLE | 4 | 6 | 0 | .400 | 4th (League) | – | – | — | — |
| Total | | 68 | 62 | 0 | .523 | | 2 | 3 | .400 | |

== Coaching history ==
=== Head coaches ===
| # | Name | Term | Regular season | | | | | Postseason | | | | Achievements |
| # | Name | Term | GC | Won | Lost | Ties | Win % | GC | Won | Lost | Win % | Achievements |
|---|---|---|---|---|---|---|---|---|---|---|---|---|
| 1 | Galen Hall | 1995–2000 | 60 | 34 | 26 | 0 | .567 | 3 | 2 | 1 | .667 | 2 World Bowl championships (1998, 2000); World League Coach of the Year (1997); NFL Europe Coach of the Year (2000) |
| 2 | Pete Kuharchek | 2001–2005 | 50 | 24 | 26 | 0 | .480 | 2 | 0 | 2 | .000 | — |
| 3 | Jim Tomsula | 2006 | 10 | 6 | 4 | 0 | .600 | – | – | – | — | — |
| 4 | Rick Lantz | 2007 | 10 | 4 | 6 | 0 | .400 | – | – | – | — | — |

=== Assistant coaches ===
- Antonio Anderson (2006)
- Bart Andrus (2000)
- Mike Bender (2001)
- Booker Brooks (2001)
- Steve Carson (1996–1997)
- Wes Chandler (1995–1997)
- Joe Clark (2001)
- Ken Clarke (2004–2005)
- Stan Davis (2007)
- A. J. Duhe (1995)
- Don Eck (2007)
- Tom Everest (2002)
- Barry Foster (2003)
- Sascha Gehloff (2005–2007)
- Brian Webb (2006)
- Alvin Harper (2005)
- James Harrell (2004)
- Bernardo Harris (2007)
- Mike Jones (1998–2000, 2002–2003)
- Whitey Jordan (1998–2000, 2002–2004)
- E. J. Junior (2005)
- Ken Karcher (1997–1999)
- Pete Kuharchek (1996–2000)
- Bob Lancaster (2006)
- Pete Levine (1996)
- Steve Logan (2006)
- Bob Lord (1997)
- Duval Love (2006)
- Jörn Maier (2001–2004)
- Vince Marrow (2007)
- Guy McIntyre (2002)
- Scott Milanovich (2003–2005)
- Larry New (2007)
- Jeff Ogden (2004)
- Kevin O'Neal (2004–2005)
- Ed O'Neil (2001–2003)
- Nate Poole (2007)
- Jan Quarless (2005)
- Jeff Reinebold (1995, 1999–2000)
- Walter Rohlfing (1995–2000)
- Steve Smith (2006)
- Don Strock (1995)
- Gary Tranquill (2007)
- Dean Unruh (1995–1996)
- Adrian White (2001–2006)

== Notable players ==
- (Germany) Richard Adjei (2004–2007)
- (Germany) Ingo Anderbrügge (2003–2004), former Schalke 04 soccer player, kicker during Fire's years in Gelsenkirchen
- (United States) Cedric Bonner (2006–2007)
- (Germany) Manfred Burgsmüller (1996–2002), kicker and oldest professional American football player at age 52
- (United States) Byron Chamberlain (1996)
- (United States) Derrick Clark (1996–1999)
- (United States) Mike Croel (1998)
- (United States) Terry Crews (1995)
- (United States) Nick Ferguson (1998)
- (Germany) Patrick Gerigk (1998)
- (United States) Steve Gleason (2001)
- (United States) James Harrison (2004)
- (United States) Drew Henson (2006)
- (United States) Andy Kelly (1996)
- (United States) Jeris McIntyre (2005)
- (United States) Fred Jackson (2006)
- (United States) Michael Lewis (2001)
- (United States) Mike Quinn (1998)
- (United States) Marcus Robinson (1998)
- (United States) Jamal Robertson (2002)
- (United States) Bill Schroeder (1997)
- (United States) Gino Torretta (1995)
- (United States) Tony Wragge (2006)
- (United States) Danny Wuerffel (2000)
- (Japan) Tamon Nakamura (1998–1999)
- (Japan) Akihito Amaya (2001–2002)
- (United States) John David Washington (2007)
- (Germany) Herbert Linecker (1997-2003)

== Other notable personnel ==
- Alexander Leibkind – General Manager 1996–2004
- Ken Karcher – Assistant coach for the Fire, was previously an NFL replacement player and later became a collegiate head coach.
- Oliver Luck – General Manager 1995, became league president the following year.
