= Rene Ingoglia =

American football player and sports broadcaster (born 1972)

Profile
- Position: Running back

Personal information
- Born: May 23, 1972 (age 54)
- Listed height: 5 ft 10 in (1.78 m)
- Listed weight: 202 lb (92 kg)

Career information
- High school: Bishop Kearney (Irondequoit, New York)
- College: UMass
- NFL draft: 1996: undrafted

Career history
- Washington Redskins (1996–1997); Buffalo Bills (1997–1998); Frankfurt Galaxy (1999)

Awards and highlights
- First-team All-American (1995); 3× All-Yankee Conference (1993–1995)

Rene Ingoglia (born May 23, 1972) is an American former professional football player who is a sports broadcaster for ESPN. He is also a detective with the Orlando Police Department.

Ingoglia played college football as a running back with the UMass Minutemen, earning All-American honors, and finishing as a finalist for the Walter Payton Award, given to the Division I-AA Player of the Year. After a short career in the National Football League and NFL Europe, he became a detective. Ingoglia returned to football as a broadcaster for UMass games, eventually joining ESPN in 2010.

== Playing career ==
Ingoglia rushed for 4,623 yards and 54 touchdowns on the ground - school records at the time - while he was twice named an all-American. He rushed for more than 1,000 yards during three separate seasons with 1,284 during 1993, 1,505 in 1994, and 1,178 in 1995. He was inducted into the UMass Athletics Hall of Fame in 2007.

Ingoglia played in the NFL with the Buffalo Bills and Washington Redskins, serving as a backup and practice squad player. He also played in NFL Europe with the Frankfurt Galaxy where he won the World Bowl in 1999, scoring the winning touchdown in the third quarter.

== Broadcasting career ==
Prior to joining ESPN, Ingoglia was a color analyst on the UMass Sports Network, where his commentary team was honored with the Best Football Broadcast in the New England by the Associated Press in 2010.

After joining ESPN in 2010, Ingoglia initially appeared on ESPN3, before moving up to ESPNews and ESPNU games.
