= Mike Jenkins (wide receiver, born 1974) =

American football player (born 1974)

No. 84, 19, 1
- Position: Wide receiver

Personal information
- Born: August 25, 1974 (age 52); Portsmouth, Virginia, U.S.
- Listed height: 6 ft 4 in (1.93 m)
- Listed weight: 200 lb (91 kg)

Career information
- High school: I. C. Norcom (Portsmouth)
- College: Hampton (1992–1996)
- NFL draft: 1997: undrafted

Career history
- Cincinnati Bengals (1997–1998); Seattle Seahawks (1998–1999)*; → Scottish Claymores (1999)
- * Offseason or practice squad member only

Awards and highlights
- Black college national champion (1994); Second-team All-MEAC (1996)

Career NFL statistics
- Games played: 4
- Stats at Pro Football Reference

Michael K. Jenkins (born August 25, 1974) is an American former professional football player who was a wide receiver for the Cincinnati Bengals of the National Football League (NFL). He played college football for the Hampton Pirates.

== Early life ==
Jenkins was born on August 25, 1974, in Portsmouth, Virginia. He attended I. C. Norcom High School in Portsmouth.

== College career ==
Jenkins played college football for the Hampton Pirates from 1992 to 1996. In four seasons, he had 148 receptions for 2,629 yards and 20 touchdowns. Jenkins' 148 receptions were a school record at the time of his graduation.

== Professional career ==
=== Cincinnati Bengals ===
After going unselected in the 1997 NFL draft, Jenkins signed with the Cincinnati Bengals as an undrafted free agent. On August 24, he was released and signed to the practice squad. On November 17, Jenkins was elevated to the active roster. He played in four games and was targeted only once. On August 25, 1998, Jenkins was waived by the Bengals.

=== Seattle Seahawks ===
On November 10, 1998, Jenkins was signed by the Seattle Seahawks to the practice squad. On August 30, 1999, he was released.

=== Scottish Claymores ===
In 1999, Jenkins was allocated to the Scottish Claymores of NFL Europe. He had ten receptions for 147 yards and 169 return yards.
