= Clyde Johnson (defensive back) =

American football player (born 1970)

No. 23, 24
- Position: Cornerback

Personal information
- Born: May 22, 1970 (age 56); Austin, Texas, U.S.
- Listed height: 5 ft 10 in (1.78 m)
- Listed weight: 191 lb (87 kg)

Career information
- High school: Lyndon B. Johnson (Austin)
- College: Kansas State
- NFL draft: 1997: undrafted

Career history
- Kansas City Chiefs (1997); Chicago Bears (1997); Amsterdam Admirals (1999)
- Stats at Pro Football Reference

Clyde Allie Johnson Jr. (born May 22, 1970) is an American former professional football cornerback who played for the Kansas City Chiefs of the National Football League (NFL). He played college football for the Kansas State Wildcats.

== Early life ==
Clyde Allie Johnson Jr. was born on May 22, 1970, in Austin, Texas. He attended Lyndon B. Johnson High School in Austin.

== College career ==
Johnson enrolled at Kansas State University in 1988 to play college football for the Wildcats. He redshirted the 1988 season. In October 1989, before ever playing a game, he quit the team due to his position on the depth chart. He then served several years in the United States Marine Corps before returning to Kansas State, where he was a three-year letterman from 1994 to 1996. Johnson recorded five interceptions for 61 yards during his college career.

== Professional career ==
After going undrafted in the 1997 NFL draft, Johnson signed with the Kansas City Chiefs on April 29, 1997. He played in 15 games during the 1997 season as a reserve cornerback, posting one solo tackle and two assisted tackles. He was waived on December 18, 1997.

Johnson was claimed off waivers by the Chicago Bears on December 19, 1997. He did not play in any games for the Bears in 1997. He was released on August 30, 1998.

Johnson played for the Amsterdam Admirals during the 1999 NFL Europe season, recording 34 tackles on defense, seven special teams tackles, two interceptions for 88 yards and one touchdown, and nine pass breakups.

== Personal life ==
Johnson's son, Daje Johnson, played college football for the Texas Longhorns and professionally for the Ottawa Redblacks of the Canadian Football League.
