= Chris Wing =

American football player (born 1971)

No. 56
- Position: Linebacker

Personal information
- Born: May 28, 1971 (age 55); Oakland , CA, U.S.
- Listed height: 6 ft 2 in (1.88 m)
- Listed weight: 235 lb (107 kg)

Career information
- High school: Redmond
- College: Boise State
- NFL draft: 1997: undrafted

Career history
- New York Jets (1997); Amsterdam Admirals (1999)
- Stats at Pro Football Reference

Christopher R. Wing (born May 28, 1971) is an American former professional football player who was a linebacker for the New York Jets of the National Football League (NFL). He played college football for the Boise State Broncos.
