= Israel Byrd =

American football player (born 1971)

Morehouse Maroon Tigers
- Title: Defensive analyst

Personal information
- Born: February 1, 1971 (age 55); St. Louis, Missouri, U.S.
- Listed height: 5 ft 11 in (1.80 m)
- Listed weight: 184 lb (83 kg)

Career information
- High school: Chesterfield (MO) Parkway Central
- College: Utah State
- NFL draft: 1993: undrafted

Career history

Playing
- New Orleans Saints (1993–1996); Scottish Claymores (1995, 1997); Tennessee Titans (1999); Berlin Thunder (1999); Tampa Bay Storm (2000); Detroit Fury (2001)

Coaching
- Parkway Central HS (MO) (2001) Defensive coordinator & defensive backs coach; Washington University (2007–2011) Defensive backs coach; St. Louis Rams (2007) Intern; Dallas Cowboys (2011) Intern; Lindenwood (2013) Defensive backs coach; Belleville West HS (IL) (2015–2016) Defensive backs coach; The First Academy (FL) (2020–2021) Defensive coordinator & defensive backs coach; West Orange HS (FL) (2022) Secondary coach & cornerbacks coach; Dr. Phillips HS (FL) (2023) Safeties coach; Morehouse (2024–present) Defensive analyst

Career NFL statistics
- Games played: 7
- Games started: 0
- Stats at Pro Football Reference
- Stats at ArenaFan.com

Israel Fabian Byrd (born February 1, 1971) is an American college football coach and former cornerback. He is a defensive analyst for Morehouse College, a position he has held since 2024. He played in the National Football League (NFL) for the New Orleans Saints and Tennessee Titans, NFL Europe for the Berlin Thunder and Scottish Claymores, and the Arena Football League (AFL) for the Tampa Bay Storm and Detroit Fury.

== Early life ==
At Parkway Central High School in Chesterfield, Missouri, Byrd excelled in football, basketball, and track and field. During his college career, he continued to excel in football and track and field at Allan Hancock College in Santa Maria, California and Utah State University in Logan, Utah. Byrd received All-Conference and All-State honors in both football and track and field during high school and All-Conference honors in both sports during his college years.

== Professional football career ==
In the NFL, Byrd played for the New Orleans Saints (1994–1996) and the Tennessee Titans (1999) and was allocated to the Scottish Claymores (1995 and 1997) and Berlin Thunder (1999) in the NFL Europe league. He returned to the United States from NFL Europe as a member of the Tennessee Titans roster, where he joined his younger brother - wide receiver Isaac Byrd.

Upon recovering from injuries, Byrd continued to play American football as a defensive specialist in the Arena Football League with the Tampa Bay Storm (2000) and the Detroit Fury (2001). After retiring from professional football, Byrd decided to complete his bachelor's degree in business and interdisciplinary studies at Utah State University and later developed and implemented business ventures.

== Coaching career ==
In 2000, Byrd began his transition into coaching defensive backs on the collegiate level. In 2008, Byrd was selected to coach Defensive Backs with the St. Louis Rams as a part of the Bill Walsh NFL Minority Coaching Fellowship Program, which provides NFL Training Camp positions to minority coaches every year. Many current NFL coaches have participated in the program and some past graduates of the program have gone on to be appointed to NFL coordinator or head coaching positions. In 2009, he was re-selected to participate in the Bill Walsh NFL Minority Coaching Fellowship Program to coach Defensive Backs with the Washington Redskins.

Byrd has been coaching Defensive Backs on the collegiate level for over five years and completed his fourth year as a Defensive Backs Coach for Washington University in St. Louis NCAA DIII football program in 2011. Byrd's defensive secondary strategies and tactics have gained him notoriety allowing him to speak at the Nike Coach of the Year Clinic in St. Louis in 2008 and 2009, where he was a Clinic Speaker on man-to-man and bump and run teaching progressions. As a result, several defensive back players at Washington University in St. Louis earned All-Conference, All-Regional, and All-American honors.

In 2011, Byrd was selected to participate in the Bill Walsh NFL Minority Coaching Fellowship Program to coach Defensive Backs and Special Teams with the Dallas Cowboys.
