= Thabiti Davis =

American football player (born 1975)

No. 80, 82, 84, 9
- Position: Wide receiver

Personal information
- Born: March 24, 1975 (age 51); Charlotte, North Carolina, U.S.
- Listed height: 6 ft 2 in (1.88 m)
- Listed weight: 205 lb (93 kg)

Career information
- High school: Olympic (NC)
- College: Wake Forest
- NFL draft: 1998: undrafted

Career history
- Carolina Panthers (1998)*; Barcelona Dragons (1999); Jacksonville Jaguars (1999)*; Berlin Thunder (2000); New York Giants (2000–2001); Orlando Predators (2003); New England Patriots (2003)*; Detroit Fury (2004); New Orleans Saints (2004)*; New Orleans VooDoo (2005); Columbus Destroyers (2006); Las Vegas Gladiators (2007)
- * Offseason or practice squad member only

Awards and highlights
- AFL All-Rookie Team (2003)

Career NFL statistics
- Receptions: 5
- Receiving yards: 74
- Stats at Pro Football Reference

Career AFL statistics
- Receptions: 471
- Receiving yards: 5,173
- Receiving touchdowns: 86
- Stats at ArenaFan.com

Thabiti Naeem Davis (born March 24, 1975) is an American former professional football player who was a wide receiver in the National Football League (NFL) and Arena Football League (AFL). He played college football for the Wake Forest Demon Deacons and was signed by the Jacksonville Jaguars as an undrafted free agent in 1999. He played with the New York Giants (2000–01) and saw action in Super Bowl XXXV.

Davis also played for the Orlando Predators, Detroit Fury, New Orleans VooDoo, Columbus Destroyers, Las Vegas Gladiators

He spent four seasons (2010-2013) as an Assistant Coach and Offensive Coordinator with Charlotte Mecklenburg Schools at E.E. Waddell High School and William A. Hough High School in Cornelius, NC, respectively. Under his leadership, the Huskies increased in both state and national rankings. The teams rank in state improved 102 spots (#149 to #47). In 2017, he completed his fourth season as Wide Receivers Coach and Special Teams Coordinator for the 2015 and 2016 CIAA Southern Division and Conference Champions, Winston-Salem State University football team following. As Special Teams Coordinator, Davis guided the development of two different CIAA Conference Special Teams Player of The Year.
