= Scott Fields (American football) =

American football player (born 1973)

No. 56, 58
- Position: Linebacker

Personal information
- Born: April 22, 1973 (age 53); Ontario, California, U.S.
- Listed height: 6 ft 2 in (1.88 m)
- Listed weight: 220 lb (100 kg)

Career information
- High school: Bishop Amat
- College: USC
- NFL draft: 1996: undrafted

Career history
- Atlanta Falcons (1996); England Monarchs (1998); Tampa Bay Buccaneers (1998)*; Berlin Thunder (1999); Seattle Seahawks (1999); Detroit Lions (1999–2000)*; Los Angeles Xtreme (2001)
- * Offseason or practice squad member only
- Stats at Pro Football Reference

Scott Fields (born April 22, 1973) is an American former professional football player who was a linebacker for the Atlanta Falcons and Seattle Seahawks of the National Football League (NFL). He played college football for the USC Trojans.
