= Brandon Noble =

American football player and coach (born 1974)

Delaware Valley Aggies
- Title: Defensive coordinator

Personal information
- Born: April 10, 1974 (age 52); San Rafael, California, U.S.
- Listed height: 6 ft 2 in (1.88 m)
- Listed weight: 305 lb (138 kg)

Career information
- High school: First Colonial (VA)
- College: Penn State
- NFL draft: 1997: undrafted

Career history

Playing
- San Francisco 49ers (1997–1998)*; Barcelona Dragons (1998–1999); Dallas Cowboys (1999–2002); Washington Redskins (2003–2005)
- * Offseason or practice squad member only

Coaching
- West Chester (2006–2008) Linebackers coach; West Chester (2010) Defensive line coach; Omaha Nighthawks (2011) Defensive line coach; Coastal Carolina (2012) Defensive line coach; Temple (2013) Defensive line coach; Nordic Storm (2025) Defensive coordinator; Delaware Valley (2026–present) Defensive coordinator

Awards and highlights
- Second-team All-Big Ten (1996); Hall Foundation Athletic Award (1996); 1997 Fiesta Bowl Defensive Player of the Game; All-NFL Europe (1999)

Career NFL statistics
- Tackles: 148
- Sacks: 8.5
- Fumble recoveries: 4
- Stats at Pro Football Reference

Brandon Patrick Noble (born April 10, 1974) is an American football coach and former professional player who was a defensive tackle in the National Football League (NFL) for the San Francisco 49ers, Dallas Cowboys and Washington Redskins. He is the defensive coordinator for Delaware Valley University, a position he has held since 2026. He played college football for the Penn State Nittany Lions.

== Early life ==
Noble attended First Colonial High School, where he played as an offensive and defensive lineman. As a senior, he was named the Class AAA State Player of the Year.

== College career ==
Noble accepted a football scholarship from Penn State University. He had to endure adversity early in his career, breaking his leg and missing the 1993 season. In the spring of 1994, he lost 40 pounds because of a bout with mononucleosis.

As a sophomore, he collected 22 tackles and 2 sacks during Penn State's undefeated 1994 season, and subsequent Rose Bowl victory over the University of Oregon. In his first full season starting as a junior, he posted 53 tackles and 4 sacks.

As a senior in 1996, he led the team with 8 sacks and had a career-high 72 tackles. He was named second-team All-Big Ten, and was awarded the Hall Foundation Athletic Award, given to the team's most outstanding senior player. He was also named the Nittany Lions' most outstanding senior player and the defensive Most Valuable Player of the Fiesta Bowl.

He earned a degree in Criminal Justice in 1998.

== Professional career ==
=== San Francisco 49ers ===
Noble was signed as an undrafted free agent by the San Francisco 49ers after the 1997 NFL draft. He was waived on August 19. On November 12, he was signed to the practice squad for a week and then cut again on November 18.

On January 13, 1998, he signed with the 49ers, who then allocated him to the Barcelona Dragons of NFL Europe. Noble returned to training camp and was released on August 25. On December 3, he was signed to the practice squad, this time for the final four weeks of the season before being waived.

=== Dallas Cowboys ===
In February 1999, Noble signed as a free agent with the Dallas Cowboys, and was again assigned to the Barcelona Dragons of NFL Europe. He had a strong showing, tallying 27 tackles (fourth on the tem), 5 sacks (fifth in the league) and one blocked extra point. He received All-NFL Europe honors and helping lead Barcelona to victory in World Bowl '97. The experience and the salary cap problems the team was having during that period of time, helped him make the team as backup defensive tackle, where he was second on the squad in tackles by non-starters (36), while making 3 sacks (tied for fourth on the team), 2 tackles for loss, 5 quarterback pressures, one pass defensed and one fumble recovery.

In 2000, Noble took over the starting role at left defensive tackle for the last 8 games, after a neck nerve irritation forced Chad Hennings to miss the rest of the season and eventually retire. He registered 69 tackles, 10 quarterback pressures,

He had his best season in 2001 after starting all 16 games and playing a key role in the Cowboy's significant improvement on defense, helping a mostly blue-collar cast finish fourth overall by allowing only 287.4 yards per game. Noble contributed with 56 tackles (ninth on the team), 4 tackles for loss, 3.5 sacks (tied for second on the team), 6 quarterback pressures (fourth on the tem) and 3 passes defensed.

In 2002, he delivered another solid season playing next to Laroi Glover, finishing his Cowboy career with 57 tackles (tenth on the team), 4 tackles for loss, 11 quarterback pressures (fifth on the team) and 32 consecutive starts.

=== Washington Redskins ===
On March 1, 2003, he signed with the Washington Redskins as a free agent. He suffered a season-ending left knee injury in the preseason and was placed on the injured reserve on August 18.

In 2004, he returned from his injury to play in all 16 games, starting seven. He recorded 38 tackles (19 solo) with one sack. He was also awarded the team's Ed Block Courage Award, given to the player who best persevered through injury. However, Noble injured his right knee in the 2005 preseason and was again placed on injured reserve on September 22.

During his rehabilitation, Noble developed a serious type of staph infection, MRSA, which nearly required amputation of his leg. After a long series of setbacks to his recovery, he was released by the Redskins on March 10, 2006, in a salary cap saving move and retired prior to the start of the season.

== NFL career statistics ==
Legend
**Bold**	Career high

Year	Team	Games		Tackles				Interceptions				Fumbles			
Year	Team	GP	GS	Comb	Solo	Ast	Sck	Int	Yds	TD	Lng	FF	FR	Yds	TD
1999	DAL	16	0	23	15	8	3.0	0	0	0	0	0	1	0	0
2000	DAL	16	9	**43**	**36**	7	1.0	0	0	0	0	**1**	0	0	0
2001	DAL	16	16	37	27	**10**	**3.5**	0	0	0	0	0	**2**	**6**	0
2002	DAL	16	16	31	23	8	0.0	0	0	0	0	0	1	0	0
2004	WAS	16	7	14	9	5	1.0	0	0	0	0	0	0	0	0
		80	48	148	110	38	8.5	0	0	0	0	1	4	6	0

== Coaching career ==
In 2006, Noble was hired as the linebackers coach at West Chester University. After a one-year hiatus from coaching, he returned as the Golden Rams' defensive line coach in 2010.

On February 17, 2011, Noble was introduced as the defensive line coach for the UFL's Omaha Nighthawks. On January 5, 2012, Noble was brought in as an assistant coach for the Coastal Carolina Chanticleers when the Nighthawks' head coach Joe Moglia took the head coaching position at CCU.

Noble joined fellow Penn Stater, Matt Rhule's staff at Temple as an assistant coach in December 2012.

Temple head coach Matt Rhule announced on December 2, 2013, that Noble was leaving the Owl's coaching staff for personal reasons.

In October 2024, Noble was announced as the defensive coordinator for the new Nordic Storm team of the European League of Football (ELF).

== Broadcasting career ==
Noble is a regular guest on the ESPN Radio show AllNight with Jason Smith during the NFL season in which Smith would dial up Noble's phone number only to get the "caller ID" message and that Smith would get through by identifying himself as an NFL player or coach making news that week. Noble appears via the OnStar hotline when either Amy Lawrence or Bob Valvano is filling in for Smith on AllNight.

He is a frequent guest on DC101's "Elliot in the Morning" in Washington, D.C., providing NFL news and analysis. He is also now the co-host of 215 Live, a two-hour podcast that airs every Monday night 7–9pm on Wildfireradio.com, and is a part of the Wildfire Sports network of shows.

== Personal life ==
Noble and his wife Mary Kate were married Thanksgiving weekend during the 2000 season. They have three children: Conner, Grace, and Jackson.

In June 2017, Noble was named spokesperson for the MRSA Survivors Network, an organization formed to raise awareness and educate the public about Methicillin-resistant Staphylococcus aureus.
