= 1999 Rhein Fire season =

NFL Europe team season

- General manager: Alexander Leibkind
- Head coach: Galen Hall
- Home stadium: Rheinstadion

Results
- Record: 6–4
- Division place: 3rd
- Playoffs: did not qualify

The 1999 Rhein Fire season was the fifth season for the franchise in the NFL Europe League (NFLEL). The team was led by head coach Galen Hall in his fifth year, and played its home games at Rheinstadion in Düsseldorf, Germany. They finished the regular season in third place with a record of six wins and four losses.

== Offseason ==
=== Free agent draft ===
1999 Rhein Fire NFLEL free agent draft selections
Draft order		Player name	Position	College
Round	Pick	Player name	Position	College
1	6	Kez McCorvey	WR	Florida State
2	12	Jonathan Himebauch	C	Southern California
3	13	Anthony McKinney	WR	Connecticut
4	24	Mike Lowery	LB	Mississippi
5	25	Carl Powell	DE	Louisville
6	36	Dell McGee	CB	Auburn
7	37	Jeremy Akers	T	Notre Dame
8	48	Ben Hanks	LB	Florida
9	49	Walter Scott	DT	East Carolina
10	60	Marvin Bagley	WR	North Carolina A&T
11	61	Chris Sanders	WR	Texas A&M
12	72	Hardy Mitchell	DT	Buffalo
13	73	Marcus Williams	P	Arizona State
14	84	Andy Russ	P	Mississippi State
16	96	Jeff Miller	T	Mississippi
17	97	David Terrell	CB	Texas-El Paso
18	108	Lamar Lyons	S	Washington
19	109	Kevin Huntley	WR	Wisconsin
20	117	Jeff Sauve	K	Clemson
21	118	Leonard Green	RB	Southern California
22	121	Dialleo Burks	WR	Eastern Kentucky
23	122	Chad Bates	G	Florida State
24	123	Rodrick Johnson	RB	UNLV
25	124	Louis Adams	LB	Oklahoma State

== Personnel ==
=== Staff ===
1999 Rhein Fire staff
Front office: General manager – Alexander Leibkind; Head coaches: Head Coach/running backs – Galen Hall; Offensive coaches: Offensive coordinator/quarterbacks – Ken Karcher; Wide receivers – Mike Jones; Offensive line – Whitey Jordan	Defensive coaches: Defensive coordinator/linebackers – Pete Kuharchek; National Coach/defensive line – Walter Rohlfing; Defensive backs/special teams – Jeff Reinebold; Strength and conditioning: Strength and conditioning – Sammy Cribb

=== Roster ===
1999 Rhein Fire final roster
Quarterbacks: 14 Jim Arellanes; 18 Mike Cherry; Running backs: 30 Kenny Bynum; 43 Derrick Clark (IR); Wide receivers: 86 Dialleo Burks; 84 Kez McCorvey; 80 Larry Ryans; 87 Jason Tucker; Tight ends: 89 Andy Haase; 89 Lamont Hall; 88 Anthony McKinney	Offensive linemen: 55 Jeremy Akers T; 66 Chad Bates G; 67 Chris Brymer G/C; 73 Mike Halapin G; 61 Jonathan Himebauch C; 78 Scott Whittaker T; 79 Clay Williams T; Defensive linemen: 90 Reggie Lowe DE; 97 Hardy Mitchell DT; 91 Carl Powell DT; 75 Walter Scott DT; 93 Mike Sutton DE; 99 Tyrone Williams DT	Linebackers: 53 Jamie Baisley MLB; 55 Ben Hanks OLB; 56 Richard Hogans OLB (IR); 51 Michael Lowery OLB; 59 Robert Thomas MLB; Defensive backs: 29 Terry Billups CB; 28 Cedric Donaldson CB; 44 Charles Emanuel S; 33 Nick Ferguson S; 20 Kenny Harris S; 45 Vance Joseph S; 24 Dell McGee CB; 25 David Terrell CB; Special teams: 2 Jeff Sauve K; 9 Marcus Williams P	National players: 10 (Germany) Manfred Burgsmüller K; 50 (Germany) Anthony Doghmi OLB; 1 (Germany) Marc Ellgering WR; 95 (Germany) Ole Meine DE; 8 (Germany) Babek Movassaghi WR; 21 (Japan) Tamon Nakamura RB; 40 (Nigeria) Oyeniran Olalere Odunayo Ojo RB; 12 (Germany) Jan Seiff QB; 96 (Germany) Jens Überschär DE; 52 (Germany) Mathias Ude OLB; Rookies in italics

== Schedule ==
Week	Date	Kickoff (Note: All times local to where the game was played.)	Opponent	Results		Game site	Attendance
Week	Date	Kickoff	Opponent	Final score	Team record	Game site	Attendance
1	Sunday, April 18	3:00 p.m.	at Scottish Claymores	L 20–21	0–1	Murrayfield Stadium	9,086
2	Sunday, April 25	4:00 p.m.	Barcelona Dragons	L 10–19	0–2	Rheinstadion	25,281
3	Saturday, May 1	7:00 p.m.	Amsterdam Admirals	W 30–20	1–2	Rheinstadion	23,883
4	Saturday, May 8	7:00 p.m.	at Frankfurt Galaxy	L 7–13	1–3	Waldstadion	39,485
5	Saturday, May 15	7:00 p.m.	Scottish Claymores	W 37–6	2–3	Rheinstadion	22,171
6	Saturday, May 22	7:00 p.m.	at Amsterdam Admirals	W 36–25	3–3	Amsterdam ArenA	14,056
7	Saturday, May 29	7:00 p.m.	Frankfurt Galaxy	L 20–21	3–4	Rheinstadion	40,143
8	Saturday, June 5	7:00 p.m.	at Berlin Thunder	W 29–0	4–4	Jahn-Sportpark	10,683
9	Saturday, June 12	8:00 p.m.	at Barcelona Dragons	W 59–14	5–4	Estadi Olímpic de Montjuïc	10,155
10	Saturday, June 19	7:00 p.m.	Berlin Thunder	W 38–10	6–4	Rheinstadion	31,350

== Standings ==
NFL Europe League
Team	W	L	T	PCT	PF	PA	Home	Road	STK
Barcelona Dragons	7	3	0	.700	263	246	4–1	3–2	W1
Frankfurt Galaxy	6	4	0	.600	239	223	3–2	3–2	L1
Rhein Fire	6	4	0	.600	286	149	3–2	3–2	W3
Amsterdam Admirals	4	6	0	.400	236	243	3–2	1–4	W2
Scottish Claymores	4	6	0	.400	270	298	2–3	2–3	L4
Berlin Thunder	3	7	0	.300	173	308	2–3	1–4	L3

== Game summaries ==
=== Week 3: vs Amsterdam Admirals ===
Week Three: Amsterdam Admirals at Rhein Fire – Game summary

Quarter	1	2	3	4	Total
Amsterdam	0	0	7	13	20
Rhein	14	3	10	3	30

at Rheinstadion, Düsseldorf, Germany

- Date: Saturday, May 1
- Game time: 7:00 p.m. CEST
- Game attendance: 23,883

=== Week 6: at Amsterdam Admirals ===
Week Six: Rhein Fire at Amsterdam Admirals – Game summary

Quarter	1	2	3	4	Total
Rhein	16	10	10	0	36
Amsterdam	3	13	0	9	25

at Amsterdam ArenA, Amsterdam, Netherlands

- Date: Saturday, May 22
- Game time: 7:00 p.m. CEST
- Game attendance: 14,056
