= Patrick Gerigk =

German gridiron football player (born 1972)

Patrick Gerigk (born April 16, 1972, in Berlin) is a football wide receiver from Germany. He played for several World Bowl-winning teams, such as the Rhein Fire (1998) and the Frankfurt Galaxy (1999).

He stands 183 cm tall and weighs 90 kg.
