= Bernard Russ =

American football player (born 1973)

No. 51, 55, 49
- Position: Linebacker

Personal information
- Born: November 4, 1973 (age 53); Utica, New York, U.S.
- Listed height: 6 ft 1 in (1.85 m)
- Listed weight: 238 lb (108 kg)

Career information
- High school: Collinwood (Cleveland, Ohio)
- College: Arizona Western JC (1993); West Virginia (1994–1996)
- NFL draft: 1997: undrafted

Career history
- Baltimore Ravens (1997)*; New England Patriots (1997–1999); → Scottish Claymores (1999); Dallas Cowboys (2000)*; New York/New Jersey Hitmen (2001); Saskatchewan Roughriders (2002)
- * Offseason or practice squad member only

Career NFL statistics
- Tackles: 4
- Stats at Pro Football Reference

Bernard Dion Russ (born November 4, 1973) is an American former professional football player who was a linebacker in the National Football League (NFL) and Canadian Football League (CFL). He played for the New England Patriots from 1997 to 1999, New York/New Jersey Hitmen in 2001 and Saskatchewan Roughriders in 2002.
