= Alexander Leibkind =

German judoka

Personal information
- Born: 19 October 1952
- Died: 18 May 2006 (aged 53)
- Occupation: Judoka

Sport
- Sport: Judo

Profile at external databases
- IJF: 54347
- JudoInside.com: 9863

Alexander Leibkind (19 October 1952, Munich, Germany – 18 May 2006, New York, New York) was a German judoka and sports manager. He was a member of the German Judo national team from 1971 to 1979, and participated in the 1976 Olympics as a lightweight (63-kg class). He served as general manager of Düsseldorf-based American football team Rhein Fire of NFL Europe from 1996 through 2004. He managed Düsseldorf's bid for the 2012 Summer Olympics.

== Sources ==
- Evans, Hilary; Gjerde, Arild; Heijmans, Jeroen; Mallon, Bill; et al. "Alexander Leibkind". Olympics at Sports-Reference.com. Sports Reference LLC. Archived from the original on 3 December 2016.
- ALEXANDER LEIBKIND VERSTORBEN, Alles Ausser Sport (in German)
