= David Thompson (American football) =

American football player (born 1975)

No. 28
- Position: Running back

Personal information
- Born: January 13, 1975 (age 51); Okmulgee, Oklahoma, U.S.
- Listed height: 5 ft 8 in (1.73 m)
- Listed weight: 196 lb (89 kg)

Career information
- High school: Okmulgee
- College: Oklahoma State
- NFL draft: 1997: undrafted

Career history
- Jacksonville Jaguars (1997}*; St. Louis Rams (1997–1999); → Amsterdam Admirals (1999)

Awards and highlights
- First-team All-Big Eight (1995); Second-team All-Big 12 (1996)

Career NFL statistics
- Games played: 12
- Rushing yards: 30
- Touchdowns: 1
- Stats at Pro Football Reference

David Farrod Thompson (born January 13, 1975) is an American former professional football player who was a running back in the National Football League (NFL) for the St. Louis Rams. He also was a member of the Amsterdam Admirals in NFL Europe. He played college football for the Oklahoma State Cowboys.

== Early life ==
Thompson attended Okmulgee High School where he rushed for 4,995. His junior and senior year saw him eclipse the 2,000 yard mark rushing for 2,500 yards his senior year. He accepted a football scholarship from Oklahoma State University. He was a four-year starter at running back and received All-conference honors as a senior. He is currently the school's third All-time career rushing leader (4,314 yards).

== Professional career ==
Thompson was signed as an undrafted free agent by the St. Louis Rams after the 1997 NFL draft, because he was considered too small to play professional football.

In 1999, he was allocated by the Rams to the Amsterdam Admirals of NFL Europe. He was the starter at running back, finishing fourth in the league with 503 rushing yards. He also had 3 rushing touchdowns and 22 receptions for 183 yards.

== Personal life ==
Thompson is a Sports Performance Coach / Personal Trainer. He currently owns a HIIT Training Studio/Gym in Dallas Texas called BURN Dallas Fitness Center. He also trains athletes from ages of 7 years old to professional. A gym owner, fitness consultant and professional fitness coach.
