= Matt Reem =

American football player (born 1972)

Profile
- Position: Offensive lineman / tight end

Personal information
- Born: December 23, 1972 (age 53); Racine, Wisconsin, U.S.
- Listed height: 6 ft 6 in (1.98 m)
- Listed weight: 270 lb (122 kg)

Career information
- High school: Concordia Academy
- College: Minnesota
- NFL draft: 1996: undrafted

Career history
- Minnesota Vikings (1996)*; Washington Redskins (1996); St. Louis Rams (1998)*; Miami Dolphins (1998)*; New England Patriots (1999)*; Barcelona Dragons (1999)
- * Offseason or practice squad member only

Matt Reem (born December 23, 1972) is an American former professional football offensive lineman and tight end in the National Football League (NFL) for the Washington Redskins, Miami Dolphins and New England Patriots. He played college football at the University of Minnesota. He played high school football at Concordia Academy in St. Paul, Minnesota.
