= Mike Parker (American football) =

American football player (born 1975)

Michael A. Parker (born July 1975, in Houston, Texas) is a former professional American football linebacker in the National Football League. He played college football at University of Houston (1994–1998) where he was named All Conference Linebacker. He signed as an NFL Free Agent in 1998 for the Tennessee Oilers, also played for Minnesota Vikings and Barcelona Dragons in NFL Europe.
