= Ralf Kleinmann =

German gridiron football player (born 1971)

Ralf Kleinmann (born March 13, 1971, in Cologne, Germany) is an American football player from Germany who played as a placekicker for NFL Europe team Frankfurt Galaxy from 1995 to 2000 and from 2003 to 2004. He also played briefly for the Tampa Bay Buccaneers in the 2003 preseason before being released in late August 2003.
