= Na'il Benjamin =

American football player (born 1974)

No. 86
- Position: Wide receiver

Personal information
- Born: November 20, 1974 (age 51); Chicago, Illinois, U.S.
- Listed height: 5 ft 11 in (1.80 m)
- Listed weight: 185 lb (84 kg)

Career information
- High school: Inglewood (Inglewood, California)
- College: California (1992–1996)
- NFL draft: 1997: undrafted

Career history
- Albany Firebirds (1998)*; Oakland Raiders (1998)*; Berlin Thunder (1999); Albany Firebirds (1999); San Francisco 49ers (1999)*; New York Jets (1999)*; Albany Firebirds (2000); Detroit Fury (2001)*; Los Angeles Avengers (2002)*
- * Offseason or practice squad member only
- Stats at ArenaFan.com

Na'il Benjamin (Ny-El; born November 20, 1974) is an American former football wide receiver. He played college football at California, and professionally in NFL Europe and the Arena Football League (AFL).

== Early life ==
Benjamin was born on November 20, 1974, in Chicago, Illinois. His given name is of Arabic origin, and means "winning" or "successful". His parents changed the spelling to fit the English pronunciation. He attended Saint Monica Preparatory in Santa Monica, California, and Inglewood High School in Inglewood, California.

== College career ==
Benjamin played college football for the California Golden Bears of the University of California, Berkeley. He redshirted the 1992 season, and was a four-year letterman from 1993 to 1996. He recorded college career totals of 156 receptions for 2,101 yards and 13 touchdowns, 49 kick returns for 943 yards, and 58 punt returns for 515 yards and one touchdown.

== Professional career ==
After going undrafted in the 1997 NFL draft, Benjamin reportedly signed with the San Francisco 49ers in April 1997. However, the deal was voided in early May after Benjamin failed his physical due to a pulled hamstring.

In October 1997, Benjamin signed with the Albany Firebirds of the Arena Football League (AFL) for the 1998 AFL season. Before the AFL season started, he signed with the Oakland Raiders in April 1998. He was released by the Raiders on August 25, 1998.

In February 1999, Benjamin was selected by the Berlin Thunder in the 1999 NFL Europe draft. He was released in training camp but signed again midway through the 1999 NFL Europe season. While playing for the Thunder, he caught 11 passes for 157 yards and one touchdown while also returning 14 kickoffs for 271 yards.

Benjamin then returned to the Firebirds. He was a wide receiver/defensive back during his time in the AFL as the league played under ironman rules. He played in three games for Albany during the 1999 AFL season, totaling six receptions for 58 yards and one touchdown, seven solo tackles, one assisted tackle, and seven kick returns for 129 yards.

Benjamin signed with the 49ers again on July 27, 1999. On August 12, 1999, in a 31–24 preseason win over the San Diego Chargers, he had four catches for 61 yards and one touchdown, including two leaping/diving catches from Jeff Garcia. Benjamin scored three touchdowns overall during the preseason and competed for the team's fifth wide receiver spot. He was waived on September 5, 1999, before the start of the regular season.

Benjamin was signed to the New York Jets' practice squad on September 13, 1999. He was waived on October 18, 1999.

Benjamin appeared in seven games for the Albany Firebirds in 2000, totaling 12 catches for 169 yards and one touchdown, five solo tackles, four assisted tackles, one interception, one forced fumble, one fumble recovery, and 12 kick returns for 229 yards.

On January 22, 2001, Benjamin was selected by the AFL's Detroit Fury in an expansion draft. He was waived on February 26, 2001.

Benjamin signed with the Los Angeles Avengers of the AFL on February 7, 2002. He was waived on March 27, 2002.

== Personal life ==
Benjamin earned a J.D. degree from the University of California, Hastings College of the Law. He became a lawyer after his football career.
