= World Bowl '99 =

1999 NFL Europe championship game

Frankfurt Galaxy	Barcelona Dragons
38	24
	1	2	3	4	Total
FRA	3	14	7	14	38
BAR	10	0	7	7	24
- Date: Sunday, June 27, 1999
- Stadium: Rheinstadion; Düsseldorf, Germany
- MVP: Andy McCullough, Wide receiver
- Referee: Pete Morelli
- Attendance: 39,643

TV in the United States
- Network: Fox
- Announcers: Sam Rosen, Matt Millen and Bill Maas

World Bowl '99 (also referred to as World Bowl VII) was the seventh championship game of the NFL Europe League. It was held at Rheinstadion in Düsseldorf, Germany on Sunday, June 27, 1999. The game was between the 6–4 Frankfurt Galaxy and the 7–3 Barcelona Dragons. 39,643 fans were in attendance for the match-up, as they witnessed Pat Barnes, Jake Delhomme (future Carolina Panthers quarterback) and the Galaxy avenge last year's World Bowl loss with a 38–24 victory over the Dragons. Galaxy wide receiver Andy McCullough captured MVP honors with six receptions for 151 yards and three touchdowns, with his longest reception at 45 yards.

== Background ==
The Dragons won the regular season series against the Galaxy, 21–15 (overtime) in Barcelona and 28–26 in Frankfurt.

== Game summary ==
With the help of Dragon, Admiral, and Fire fans, Barcelona was able to go deep into Galaxy territory on their opening drive, but Frankfurt's defense managed to hold its ground, limiting the Dragons to a 38-yard field goal by Jesus Angoy. The Galaxy had their fans in the game after Ralf Kleinmann's 25-yard field goal tied the game at 3–3. However, the Dragons managed to take advantage of a defensive pass interference penalty, eventually setting up running back Lawrence Phillips' four-yard touchdown run. However, the touchdown would come at a price. Phillips injured his hamstring shortly after the play and he would have to leave the game. This would put the Dragons in the passing lane, rather than their normal running game. In the second quarter, the Galaxy would respond to Barcelona's touchdown by having Galaxy quarterback Pat Barnes connect with wide receiver Andy McCullough on an 11-yard touchdown pass. When Frankfurt got the ball back, Barnes and McCullough hooked up with each other again, with a 32-yard touchdown pass. After both teams each had two failed drives, the Galaxy entered halftime, leading 17–10. In the third quarter, the Dragons got back in the game by recovering a fumble and then, capping off an eight-play, 25-yard drive with Dragons quarterback Todd Bouman throwing a five-yard pass to Brian Finneran. However, Frankfurt responded with a seven-play, 40-yard drive that ended with a three-yard run by Rene Ingoglia. Near the beginning of the fourth quarter, Galaxy quarterback Jake Delhomme concluded a 14-play, 98-yard drive with an eight-yard touchdown pass to wide receiver Mario Bailey. Down 31–17, the Dragons had to get a lot of points really fast. They responded with a two-yard touchdown run by Mario Grier. However, the Galaxy managed to put the game away, with Barnes leading a nine-play, 80-yard drive that ended with MVP Andy McCullough catching a seven-yard touchdown pass. With their victory, the Frankfurt Galaxy managed to become the very first NFL Europe team to win two World Bowls.

=== Scoring summary ===
	1	2	3	4	Total
Frankfurt	3	14	7	14	38
Barcelona	10	0	7	7	24

- Barcelona – FG Angoy 38 yd 7:10 1st
- Frankfurt – FG Kleinmann 25 yd 11:41 1st
- Barcelona – TD Phillips 4 yd run 14:39 1st
- Frankfurt – TD McCullogh 11 yd pass from Barnes 2:20 2nd
- Frankfurt – TD McCullogh 32 yd pass from Barnes 7:34 2nd
- Barcelona – TD Finneran 5 yd pass from Bouman 4:50 3rd
- Frankfurt – TD Ingoglia 3 yd run 8:29 3rd
- Frankfurt – TD Bailey 8 yd pass from Delhomme 2:34 4th
- Barcelona – TD Grier 2 yd run 6:02 4th
- Frankfurt – TD McCullogh 7 yd pass from Barnes 11:42 4th

== Starting lineups ==
Starting lineups for World Bowl '99
Frankfurt	Position	Barcelona
Offense
Todd Floyd	WR	Alonzo Johnson
Mario Bailey	WR	Brian Finneran
Andy McCullough	WR	Thabiti Davis
Werner Hippler	TE	Marco Martos
Jay Hagood	LT	Melvin Tuten
Robert Barr	LG	Tom Claro
Juan Porter	C	Matt Reem
Steve Scifres	RG	Michael Batiste
Curtis McGee	RT	Deron Thorp
Jake Delhomme	QB	Todd Bouman
Jermaine Chaney	RB	Lawrence Phillips
Defense
Harold Gragg	DE	Kendrick Burton
Marcus Richter	DT	Winfield Garnett
Denauld Brown	DT	Brandon Noble
Kendrick Gholston	DE	Marvin Thomas
Whit Marshall	LB	Dave Thomas
Derek Strey	LB	Mike Maslowski
Jimmy Clements	LB	Mike Parker
Dorian Brew	CB	Ricky Bell
Clarence Love	CB	Tristan Moss
Cory Gilliard	SS	Kadar Hamilton
Tony Maranto	FS	Gregoire Malo
