= 1999 NFL Europe season =

European-American football season

The 1999 NFL Europe season was the seventh season in 9 years of the American football league that started out as the World League of American Football. The Berlin Thunder replaced the England Monarchs for the 1999 season.

NFL Europe League
Team	W	L	T	PCT	PF	PA	Home	Road	STK
Barcelona Dragons	7	3	0	.700	263	246	4–1	3–2	W1
Frankfurt Galaxy	6	4	0	.600	239	223	3–2	3–2	L1
Rhein Fire	6	4	0	.600	286	149	3–2	3–2	W3
Amsterdam Admirals	4	6	0	.400	236	243	3–2	1–4	W2
Scottish Claymores	4	6	0	.400	270	298	2–3	2–3	L4
Berlin Thunder	3	7	0	.300	173	308	2–3	1–4	L3

== World Bowl '99 ==
World Bowl '99 was held on Sunday, June 27, 1999 at Rheinstadion in Düsseldorf, Germany. The Frankfurt Galaxy defeated the Barcelona Dragons, 38-24.
