= Barcelona Dragons (NFL Europe) =

Professional American football team in Spain

Logo

General information
- Founded: 1991; 35 years ago
- Folded: 2003; 23 years ago
- Stadium: Estadi Olímpic Lluís Companys, Mini Estadi
- Headquartered: Barcelona, Catalonia, Spain
- Colors: Dark Green, Scarlet Red, Gold, White
- Mascot: Gregori

Personnel
- Head coach: Jack Bicknell

League / conference affiliations
- World League of American Football (NFL Europe)

Championships
- World Bowls: 1 World Bowl '97

The Barcelona Dragons were an American football team that was a part of the World League of American Football and later in the resurrected NFL Europe. Their home field in Barcelona was the Estadi Olímpic de Montjuic, and later the Mini Estadi.

The Dragons were successful on the field, making it to 4 World Bowls (1991, 1997, 1999, 2001) and winning World Bowl V in 1997.

== History ==
The team was made part of the FC Barcelona organization in 2002 as the "FC Barcelona Dragons", which saw them move mid-season from the city's Olympic stadium to FC Barcelona's second stadium, the Mini Estadi, with its capacity of 15,276.

Despite these efforts, the franchise's fan support decreased and the team began to struggle financially. After the 2003 season, the Dragons were discontinued and they were replaced in the league by the Cologne Centurions.

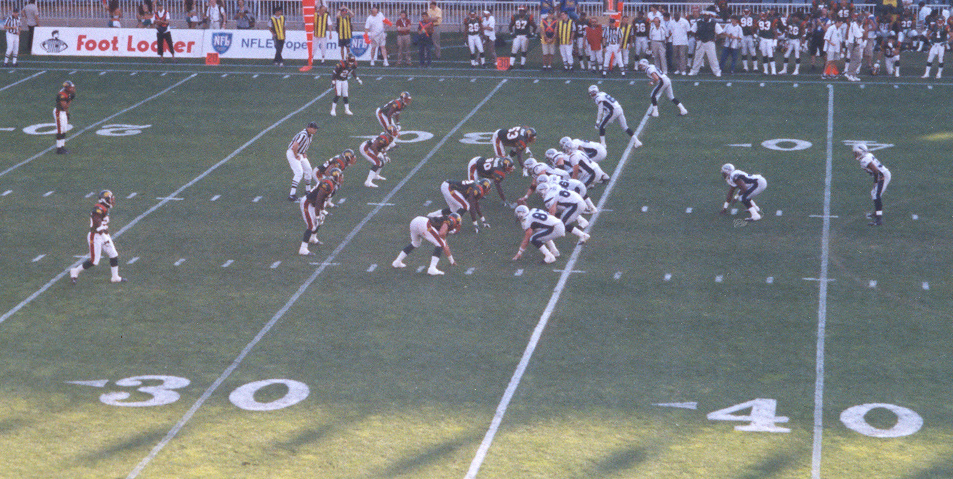
Scene of a Dragons game

For the entire duration of the Dragons' history they had only one head coach, "Cowboy" Jack Bicknell. His nickname was translated by his adoptive city to El Caballero (with its additional connotations of "Knight" or "Gentleman" in Spanish).

From 1991 to 2002, Seymour "Red" Kelin was responsible for Defensive Coordinating duties. Bicknell and Kelin had been coaching together since their days at Boston College, where they helped lead the Eagles to a Cotton Bowl Classic victory in 1984.

In 2021, an unrelated entity of the same name was founded to participate in the inaugural season of the new European League of Football. This new team has announced the Estadi Municipal de Reus as their home field for their participation in this new league.

== Season-by-season ==
The Dragons lost the inaugural World Bowl 21–0 to the London Monarchs in 1991. The game was played at Wembley Stadium in front of more than 60,000 fans.

That was to be the first of four World Bowl appearances for the Dragons, with the second bringing their first success in 1997. In an extremely tight group stage that year, the Dragons finished second with a .500 record, and then beat Rhein Fire 38–24 in the final.

That would prove to be the Dragons' only trophy, but they made it to the World Bowl twice more, losing 38–24 to Frankfurt Galaxy in 1999, and 24–17 to Berlin Thunder in 2001. In both years they had finished top of the regular season standings.

Season	League	Regular season					Postseason			
Season	League	Won	Lost	Ties	Win/Loss	Finish	Won	Lost	Win/Loss	Result
1991	WLAF	8	2	0	.800	2nd (European)	1	1	.500	Lost to London Monarchs in World Bowl '91
1992	WLAF	5	5	0	.500	1st (European)	0	1	.000	Lost to Sacramento Surge in semifinal
1993	WLAF suspended operations from 1993 to 1994									
1994	WLAF suspended operations from 1993 to 1994									
1995	WLAF	5	5	0	.500	3rd (League)	–	–	—	Out of playoffs.
1996	WLAF	5	5	0	.500	4th (League)	–	–	—	Out of playoffs.
1997	WLAF	5	5	0	.500	2nd (League)	1	0	1.000	World Bowl '97 champions
1998	NFLE	4	6	0	.400	4th (League)	–	–	—	Out of playoffs.
1999	NFLE	7	3	0	.700	1st (League)	0	1	.000	Lost to Frankfurt Galaxy in World Bowl '99
2000	NFLE	5	5	0	.500	3rd (League)	–	–	—	Out of playoffs.
2001	NFLE	8	2	0	.800	1st (League)	0	1	.000	Lost to Berlin Thunder in World Bowl IX
2002	NFLE	2	8	0	.200	6th (League)	–	–	—	Out of playoffs.
2003	NFLE	5	5	0	.500	4th (League)	–	–	—	Out of playoffs.
Total		59	51	0	.536		2	4	.333	

== Head coaches ==
#	Name	Term	Regular season					Postseason				Achievements
#	Name	Term	GC	Won	Lost	Ties	Win/Loss	GC	Won	Lost	Win/Loss	Achievements
1	Jack Bicknell	1991–2003	110	59	51	0	.536	6	2	4	.333	World Bowl '97 championship NFL Europe Coach of the Year (2001)
