= Frankfurt Galaxy (NFL Europe) =

American football team based in Germany

- Logo
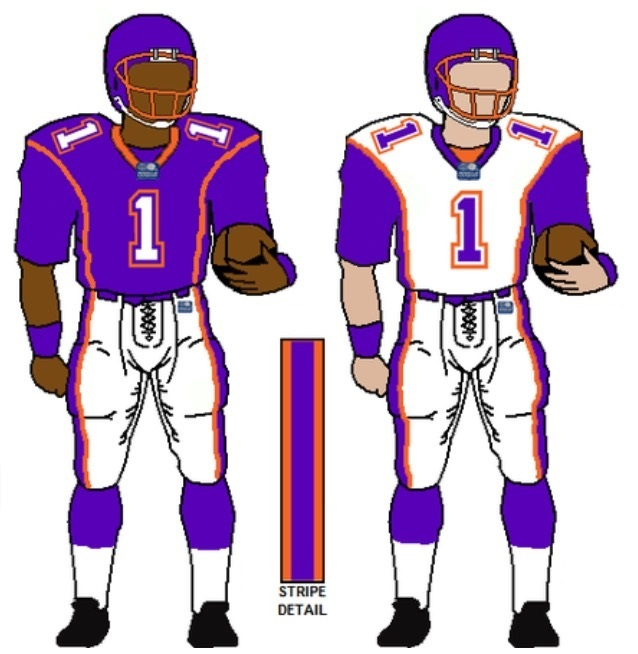
- Uniforms

General information
- Founded: 1991
- Folded: 2007
- Stadium: Commerzbank-Arena
- Headquartered: Frankfurt, Germany
- Colors: Purple and Orange

League / conference affiliations
- World League of American Football (NFL Europe)

Championships
- World Bowl: 4: World Bowl III (1995); World Bowl VII (1999); World Bowl XI (2003); World Bowl XIV (2006)

The Frankfurt Galaxy were a professional American football team that originally played in the World League of American Football and later in the resurrected NFL Europe. The team was based in Frankfurt, Germany and played in the Commerzbank-Arena, formerly called Waldstadion. The Galaxy was the only team in the league to have remained in operation and in the same city throughout the league's existence.

As of 2026, an unrelated team of the same name plays in the European Football Alliance.

== History ==
In 1991, the Galaxy was a founding member of the World League of American Football (WLAF). They hosted the first ever WLAF game against the London Monarchs at the Waldstadion on March 23, 1991, and scored the first ever WLAF points with a safety, but lost the game.

When the World League resumed in 1995, the Galaxy, the Monarchs, and Barcelona Dragons were the only former WLAF teams that continued playing. Before it folded, Frankfurt Galaxy was the oldest professional football team outside of the NFL and CFL. Frankfurt Galaxy also played in the last NFL Europa game, losing the 2007 World Bowl to the Hamburg Seadevils.

The Frankfurt Galaxy's record eight appearances in the 15 World Bowl games were evenly split in the composite standings with four wins (1995, 1999, 2003 and 2006) and four losses (1996, 1998, 2004, and 2007).

== Season-by-season ==
| Season | League | Regular season | | | | | Postseason | | | |
| Season | League | Won | Lost | Ties | Win % | Finish | Won | Lost | Win % | Result |
|---|---|---|---|---|---|---|---|---|---|---|
| 1991 | WLAF | 7 | 3 | 0 | .700 | 3rd (European) | – | – | — | — |
| 1992 | WLAF | 3 | 7 | 0 | .300 | 2nd (European) | – | – | — | — |
| 1993 | WLAF suspended operations from 1993 to 1994 | | | | | | | | | |
| 1994 | WLAF suspended operations from 1993 to 1994 | | | | | | | | | |
| 1995 | WLAF | 6 | 4 | 0 | .600 | 2nd (League) | 1 | 0 | 1.000 | World Bowl '95 champions |
| 1996 | WLAF | 6 | 4 | 0 | .600 | 2nd (League) | 0 | 1 | .000 | Lost to Scottish Claymores in World Bowl '96 |
| 1997 | WLAF | 4 | 6 | 0 | .400 | 5th (League) | – | – | — | — |
| 1998 | NFLE | 7 | 3 | 0 | .700 | 1st (League) | 0 | 1 | .000 | Lost to Rhein Fire in World Bowl '98 |
| 1999 | NFLE | 6 | 4 | 0 | .600 | 2nd (League) | 1 | 0 | 1.000 | World Bowl '99 champions |
| 2000 | NFLE | 4 | 6 | 0 | .400 | 5th (League) | – | – | — | — |
| 2001 | NFLE | 3 | 7 | 0 | .300 | 6th (League) | – | – | — | — |
| 2002 | NFLE | 6 | 4 | 0 | .600 | 3rd (League) | – | – | — | — |
| 2003 | NFLE | 6 | 4 | 0 | .600 | 1st (League) | 1 | 0 | 1.000 | World Bowl XI champions |
| 2004 | NFLE | 7 | 3 | 0 | .700 | 2nd (League) | 0 | 1 | .000 | Lost to Berlin Thunder in World Bowl XII |
| 2005 | NFLE | 3 | 7 | 0 | .300 | 5th (League) | – | – | — | — |
| 2006 | NFLE | 7 | 3 | 0 | .700 | 2nd (League) | 1 | 0 | 1.000 | World Bowl XIV champions |
| 2007 | NFLE | 7 | 3 | 0 | .700 | 2nd (League) | 0 | 1 | .000 | Lost to Hamburg Sea Devils in World Bowl XV |
| Total | | 82 | 68 | 0 | .547 | | 4 | 4 | .500 | |

== Head coaches ==
| # | Name | Term | Regular season | | | | | Postseason | | | | Achievements |
| # | Name | Term | GC | Won | Lost | Ties | Win % | GC | Won | Lost | Win % | Achievements |
|---|---|---|---|---|---|---|---|---|---|---|---|---|
| 1 | Jack Elway | 1991–1992 | 20 | 10 | 10 | 0 | .500 | – | – | – | — | — |
| 2 | Ernie Stautner | 1995–1997 | 30 | 16 | 14 | 0 | .533 | 2 | 1 | 1 | .500 | World Bowl '95 championship World League Coach of the Year (1995) |
| 3 | Dick Curl | 1998–2000 | 30 | 17 | 13 | 0 | .567 | 2 | 1 | 1 | .500 | World Bowl '99 championship 2× NFL Europe Coach of the Year (1998, 1999) |
| 4 | Doug Graber | 2001–2003 | 30 | 15 | 15 | 0 | .500 | 1 | 1 | 0 | 1.000 | World Bowl XI championship NFL Europe Coach of the Year (2003) |
| 5 | Mike Jones | 2004–2007 | 40 | 24 | 16 | 0 | .600 | 3 | 1 | 2 | .333 | World Bowl XIV championship NFL Europe Coach of the Year (2006) |

== Notable players ==
| No. | Player | Position(s) | Years played | Notable |
|---|---|---|---|---|
| 5, 81 | (United States) Mario Bailey | WR | 1995–2000 | All-Time NFL Europe Receiving leader |
| 1, 18 | (United States) Andy McCullough | WR | 1999, 2001 | World Bowl VII Most Valuable Player |
| 4 | (United States) J. T. O'Sullivan | QB | 2004, 2007 | NFL Europa Co-Offensive Most Valuable Player (2007) |
| 11 | (United States) Mike Perez | QB | 1991–1992 | First starting quarterback in team history |
| 32 | (United States) Roger Robinson | RB | 2006 | Led League in rushing, All-NFLEL team selection |
| 82 | (United States) Keith L. Craig | WR | 1991 | First Service Member (U.S.Army) selected under Operation Discovery |
| 16 | (United States) Jake Delhomme | QB | 1999 | World Bowl VII champion and Super Bowl XXXVIII starting quarterback |
