= 2001 Barcelona Dragons season =

NFL Europe team season

2001 Barcelona Dragons (NFL Europe) season
- General manager: Rafael Cervera
- Head coach: Jack Bicknell
- Home stadium: Estadi Olímpic de Montjuïc

Results
- Record: 8–2
- Division place: 1st
- Playoffs: Lost World Bowl IX

The 2001 Barcelona Dragons season was the ninth season for the franchise in the NFL Europe League (NFLEL). The team was led by head coach Jack Bicknell in his ninth year, and played its home games at Estadi Olímpic de Montjuïc in Barcelona, Catalonia, Spain. They finished the regular season in first place with a record of eight wins and two losses. In World Bowl IX, Barcelona lost to the Berlin Thunder 24–17.

== Offseason ==
=== Free agent draft ===
2001 Barcelona Dragons NFLEL free agent draft selections
Draft order			Player name	Position	College
Round	Choice	Overall	Player name	Position	College
1	4	4	Carl Bradley	DT	Virginia Tech
2	4	10	Teto Simpson	DE	North Carolina
3	3	15	Danny Scott	DE	Louisiana Lafayette
4	4	22	Antonio Brown	T	Illinois
5	3	27	Jim Emanuel	LB	Hofstra
6	4	34	Kevin Homer	LB	Chadron State
7	3	39	Marvin Love	CB	Kentucky
8	4	46	Chris Avery	DE	Kentucky State
9	3	51	Griff Yates	RB	Southern Oregon State
10	3	57	Ryan Sutter	S	Colorado
11	2	61	Jason Baker	T	Montana
12	2	64	James Perry	QB	Brown

== Personnel ==
=== Staff ===
2001 Barcelona Dragons (NFL Europe) staff
Front office: General manager – Rafael Cervera; Head coaches: Head coach – Jack Bicknell; Offensive coaches: Offensive coordinator/offensive line – Vince Martino; Quarterbacks/Wide Receivers – Sam Rutigliano; National coach/running backs – Marcos Guirles	Defensive coaches: Defensive coordinator/linebackers – Red Kelin; Defensive line – Ken Clarke; Defensive backs – Dan Daniel

=== Roster ===
2001 Barcelona Dragons final roster
Quarterbacks: 7 Jarious Jackson; 8 Rod Robinson; Running backs: 22 Lloyd Clemons; 2 Mike Green; 23 Rashon Spikes; Wide receivers: 19 Eddie Conti; 16 Chris Daniels; 84 Brad Freeman; 86 Bryan Gilmore; 87 Trevor Insley; 81 Tony Simmons; Tight ends: 88 Brad Christenson; 89 John Waerig	Offensive linemen: 74 John Feugill T; 73 Steve Herndon G; 64 John Merandi C/G; 67 Tom Moreira G; 65 O'Lester Pope T; 57 Jason Watts C; 75 Donnie Young G/T; Defensive linemen: 90 Clay Arnold DT; 98 Donald Broomfield DT; 77 Rameel Connor DE; 72 Tim Engelhardt DT; 52 Ike Reid DE; 93 Teto Simpson DE; 91 Keith Washington DE	Linebackers: 50 Corey Atkins MLB; 51 Jim Emanuel OLB; 53 Montree Foote OLB; 58 Muadianvita Kazadi MLB; 59 Troy Pelshak OLB; 54 Antonio Wilson OLB; Defensive backs: 33 JoJuan Armour S; 25 DeAuntae Brown CB; 26 Anthony Malbrough CB; 21 Craig Miller CB/S; 24 Sean Morey CB; 29 Jeff Popovich S; 35 Torrey Rush S; Special teams: 15 Bill Lafleur P; 5 Eric Olsen K	National players: 14 (Spain) Jesús Angoy K; 20 (France) Samyr Hamoudi CB; 1 (Mexico) Marco Martos WR; 46 (Spain) Vicenc Rodriguez TE; 82 (Mexico) Carlos Rosado WR; 27 (Germany) Marcus Schuster RB; 56 (Norway) Phillip Sissener MLB; 55 (Russia) Mikhail Sloutsky OLB; Rookies in italics

== Schedule ==
Week	Date	Kickoff (Note: All times local to where the game was played.)	Opponent	Results		Game site	Attendance
Week	Date	Kickoff	Opponent	Final score	Team record	Game site	Attendance
1	Saturday, April 21	6:00 p.m.	at Berlin Thunder	W 21–14	1–0	Jahn-Sportpark	8,213
2	Saturday, April 28	5:00 p.m.	Rhein Fire	W 24–12	2–0	Estadi Olímpic de Montjuïc	8,423
3	Saturday, May 5	7:00 p.m.	at Rhein Fire	W 27–21	3–0	Rheinstadion	30,984
4	Saturday, May 12	5:00 p.m.	Amsterdam Admirals	W 31–14	4–0	Estadi Olímpic de Montjuïc	9,222
5	Saturday, May 19	7:00 p.m.	at Amsterdam Admirals	L 13–33	4–1	Amsterdam ArenA	11,873
6	Saturday, May 26	5:00 p.m.	Berlin Thunder	W 55–35	5–1	Estadi Olímpic de Montjuïc	9,661
7	Saturday, June 2	5:00 p.m.	Frankfurt Galaxy	W 31–20	6–1	Estadi Olímpic de Montjuïc	9,851
8	Sunday, June 10	3:00 p.m.	at Scottish Claymores	W 14–9	7–1	Hampden Park	14,483
9	Saturday, June 16	5:00 p.m.	Scottish Claymores	W 26–7	8–1	Estadi Olímpic de Montjuïc	10,180
10	Saturday, June 23	7:00 p.m.	at Frankfurt Galaxy	L 10–26	8–2	Waldstadion	31,215
World Bowl IX
11	Saturday, June 30	6:00 p.m.	Berlin Thunder	L 17–24	8–3	Amsterdam ArenA	32,116

== Standings ==
NFL Europe League
Team	W	L	T	PCT	PF	PA	Home	Road	STK
Barcelona Dragons	8	2	0	.800	252	191	5–0	3–2	L1
Berlin Thunder	6	4	0	.600	270	239	4–1	2–3	W2
Rhein Fire	5	5	0	.500	174	179	4–1	1–4	L1
Scottish Claymores	4	6	0	.400	168	188	4–1	0–5	W1
Amsterdam Admirals	4	6	0	.400	194	226	4–1	0–5	L3
Frankfurt Galaxy	3	7	0	.300	199	234	3–2	0–5	W1

== Game summaries ==
=== Week 1: at Berlin Thunder ===
Week One: Barcelona Dragons at Berlin Thunder – Game summary

Quarter	1	2	3	4	Total
Barcelona	7	7	7	0	21
Berlin	0	7	0	7	14

at Friedrich-Ludwig-Jahn-Sportpark, Berlin, Germany

- Date: Saturday, April 21
- Game time: 6:05 p.m. CEST
- Game attendance: 8,213
- Referee: Walt Anderson

=== World Bowl IX ===
World Bowl IX: Barcelona Dragons vs Berlin Thunder – Game summary

Quarter	1	2	3	4	Total
Berlin	4	6	0	14	24
Barcelona	3	6	8	0	17

at Amsterdam ArenA, Amsterdam, Netherlands

- Date: Saturday, June 30
- Game time: 6:00 p.m. CEST
- Game weather: 70 °F (21 °C)
- Game attendance: 32,116
- Referee: Terry McAulay
- TV announcers (FOX): Curt Menefee and Brian Baldinger
