= 2001 Amsterdam Admirals season =

NFL Europe team season

- General manager: Ronald Buys
- Head coach: Bart Andrus
- Home stadium: Amsterdam ArenA

Results
- Record: 4–6
- Division place: 5th
- Playoffs: Did not qualify

The 2001 Amsterdam Admirals season was the seventh season for the franchise in the NFL Europe League (NFLEL). The team was led by head coach Bart Andrus in his first year, and played its home games at Amsterdam ArenA in Amsterdam, Netherlands. They finished the regular season in fifth place with a record of four wins and six losses.

== Offseason ==
=== Free agent draft ===
2001 Amsterdam Admirals NFLEL free agent draft selections
Draft order			Player name	Position	College
Round	Choice	Overall	Player name	Position	College
1	3	3	Robert Skapura	T	Louisiana Tech
2	3	9	Donta Kendrick	G	Southern California
3	4	16	Donnie Spragan	LB	Stanford
4	3	21	Clint Bendele	T	Southwest Texas State
5	4	28	Jamie Heiner	LB	Northern Colorado
6	3	33	Spencer George	RB	Rice
7	4	40	Roshaun Matthews	LB	Southern
8	3	45	Simod Covington	T	New Jersey City
9	4	52	Gerald Harris	WR	Washington
10	2	56	Tony Mainella	T	Fairmont State

== Personnel ==
=== Staff ===
2001 Amsterdam Admirals staff
Front office: General Manager – Ronald Buys; Head coaches: Head Coach/Offensive Coordinator – Bart Andrus; Offensive coaches: National Coach/Running Backs – John Leijten; Wide Receivers/Tight Ends – Harry Justvig; Offensive Line – Jeff Lewis	Defensive coaches: Defensive Coordinator/Linebackers – Larry Owens; Defensive Line – Darryl Sims; Defensive Backs/Special Teams – Jeff Reinebold; Strength and conditioning: Strength and Conditioning – Joseph Benes

=== Roster ===
2001 Amsterdam Admirals final roster
Quarterbacks: 10 Sean Keenan; 13 Spergon Wynn; Running backs: 22 Spencer George; 21 Clarence Williams; Wide receivers: 80 Chris Coleman; 1 Gerald Harris; 12 Drew O'Conner; 19 Anthony Tucker; Tight ends: 85 James Hill; 88 Kirk McMullen; 87 Kawasak Penn; 89 John Waerig	Offensive linemen: 74 Mark Bristol T; 65 Anthony Byrd G; 71 Corey Hulsey T; 70 Donta Kendrick G; 72 Dennis O'Sullivan C; 63 Brad Williams G; 77 Joe Wong T; Defensive linemen: 92 Winfield Garnett DT; 93 Otis Grant DE; 99 Roshaun Matthews DE; 91 Sean Powell DT; 98 Matt Sweeney DE	Linebackers: 50 Brendon Ayanbadejo MLB (IR); 59 Dwan Epps MLB; 57 John Eskridge OLB; 55 Al Rice OLB; 51 Donnie Spragan OLB; 52 Brennen Swanson OLB; Defensive backs: 20 Mikki Allen CB (IR); 36 Antonio Banks CB; 25 Kory Blackwell CB; 26 Darwin Brown CB; 29 Armon Hatcher S; 28 Marcus Hill S; 35 Evan Howell CB (IR); 46 Brock McGrew S; 20 Brandon Sanders S; 43 Tim Strickland CB; 26 Mark Tate CB; Special teams: 15 Jason Malecki P; 8 Justin Skinner K	National players: 23 (Netherlands) Rey Agaoglu S; 27 (Netherlands) Fabian Baldwin RB; 14 (Netherlands) Silvio Diliberto K; 24 (Netherlands) Marlon Etnel S; 84 (Japan) Nobutaka Horie WR; 58 (Japan) Masafumi Kawaguchi MLB; 18 (Netherlands) Niels Meijer WR; 94 (Croatia) Bernard Rozic DT; Rookies in italics

== Schedule ==
Week	Date	Kickoff (Note: All times local to where the game was played.)	Opponent	Results		Game site	Attendance
Week	Date	Kickoff	Opponent	Final score	Team record	Game site	Attendance
1	Saturday, April 21	7:00 p.m.	at Rhein Fire	L 20–24	0–1	Rheinstadion	31,437
2	Saturday, April 28	7:00 p.m.	Scottish Claymores	W 14–10	1–1	Amsterdam ArenA	12,516
3	Saturday, May 5	7:00 p.m.	Frankfurt Galaxy	W 28–14	2–1	Amsterdam ArenA	14,268
4	Saturday, May 12	5:00 p.m.	at Barcelona Dragons	L 14–31	2–2	Estadi Olímpic de Montjuïc	9,222
5	Saturday, May 19	7:00 p.m.	Barcelona Dragons	W 33–13	3–2	Amsterdam ArenA	11,873
6	Sunday, May 27	3:00 p.m.	at Scottish Claymores	L 7–17	3–3	Hampden Park	15,983
7	Saturday, June 2	7:00 p.m.	Rhein Fire	W 17–14	4–3	Amsterdam ArenA	13,823
8	Saturday, June 9	7:00 p.m.	at Frankfurt Galaxy	L 23–28	4–4	Waldstadion	29,587
9	Saturday, June 16	6:00 p.m.	at Berlin Thunder	L 10–41	4–5	Jahn-Sportpark	10,478
10	Sunday, June 24	6:00 p.m.	Berlin Thunder	L 28–34	4–6	Amsterdam ArenA	13,812

== Standings ==
NFL Europe League
Team	W	L	T	PCT	PF	PA	Home	Road	STK
Barcelona Dragons	8	2	0	.800	252	191	5–0	3–2	L1
Berlin Thunder	6	4	0	.600	270	239	4–1	2–3	W2
Rhein Fire	5	5	0	.500	174	179	4–1	1–4	L1
Scottish Claymores	4	6	0	.400	168	188	4–1	0–5	W1
Amsterdam Admirals	4	6	0	.400	194	226	4–1	0–5	L3
Frankfurt Galaxy	3	7	0	.300	199	234	3–2	0–5	W1

== Game summaries ==
=== Week 1: at Rhein Fire ===
Week One: Amsterdam Admirals at Rhein Fire – Game summary

Quarter	1	2	3	4	Total
Amsterdam	13	0	7	0	20
Rhein	7	7	7	3	24

at Rheinstadion, Düsseldorf, Germany

- Date: Saturday, April 21
- Game time: 7:06 p.m. CEST
- Game attendance: 31,437
- Referee: Terry McAulay
