= Jim Arellanes =

American football player (born 1974)

No. 14, 16
- Position: Quarterback

Personal information
- Born: January 30, 1974 (age 52); Pico Rivera, California, U.S.
- Listed height: 6 ft 4 in (1.93 m)
- Listed weight: 217 lb (98 kg)

Career information
- High school: El Rancho (Pico Rivera)
- College: Northern Arizona (1992–1993); Los Angeles Valley College (1994); Fresno State (1995–1996)
- NFL draft: 1997: undrafted

Career history
- Seattle Seahawks (1997–1998)*; Rhein Fire (1998–1999); Carolina Cobras (2000); Florida Bobcats (2000); Orlando Rage (2001); Rhein Fire (2001)
- * Offseason or practice squad member only

Awards and highlights
- World Bowl champion (1998); World Bowl MVP (1998)
- Stats at ArenaFan.com

James Arellanes (born January 30, 1974) is a former professional American football player who was a quarterback in the NFL Europe League (NFLEL), the Arena Football League (AFL), and the XFL. He played for the Rhein Fire of the NFLEL, the Carolina Cobras and Florida Bobcats of the AFL, and the Orlando Rage of the XFL. Arellanes played collegiately at Los Angeles Valley College before transferring to Fresno State.

== Early life ==
Arellanes attended El Rancho High School in Pico Rivera, California, where he was a two-time all-league selection in football and a three-time all-league pick in baseball. He also earned varsity letters in baseball. As a senior, he was named league MVP and helped lead his team to two league championships.

== College career ==
=== Northern Arizona ===
In 1992, Arellanes joined the Northern Arizona Lumberjacks football program, where he redshirted his freshman season. He saw limited action the following year, serving as the backup quarterback to Jeff Lewis. Prior to the 1994 season, Arellanes transferred to Los Angeles Valley College.

=== Los Angeles Valley College ===
In 1994, Arellanes led the Monarchs to a 10–1 record and was named Offensive Player of the Year in the Western State Conference. He set a school record with 3,909 passing yards and 30 touchdowns. Against Bakersfield, he established another school record with 639 passing yards. In the Orange County Bowl against Rancho Santiago, he threw for 426 yards and five touchdowns in a 36–28 victory, earning MVP honors.

=== Fresno State ===
Arellanes transferred to Fresno State for the 1995 season, where he split time at quarterback with Richie Donati. He made his Bulldogs debut in Week 1 against Louisiana–Monroe, completing 16 of 23 passes for 192 yards and two touchdowns in a 31–17 victory. His standout performance came against UTEP, when he threw for 412 yards and five touchdowns in a 47–14 win. He appeared in eight games that season, making four starts, and completed 102 of 172 passes for 1,539 yards with 13 touchdowns and six interceptions.

He returned in 1996 as the team’s starting quarterback, starting all 11 games. In Week 5 against San Jose State, he completed 21 of 29 passes for 356 yards and three touchdowns in a 28–18 victory. The Bulldogs finished 4–7, while Arellanes recorded 2,487 passing yards, 13 touchdowns, and 14 interceptions. Over two seasons at Fresno State, Arellanes completed 275 of 453 passes for 4,206 yards with 26 touchdowns and 20 interceptions, while also adding one rushing touchdown.

== Professional career ==
=== Seattle Seahawks / Rhein Fire ===
Arellanes was signed as an undrafted free agent by the Seattle Seahawks following the 1997 NFL draft on April 25, 1997. He was released after the third preseason game on August 18, but was re-signed to the practice squad on December 17.

In the spring of 1998, Arellanes was allocated to the Rhein Fire of NFL Europe. He spent the season as the backup quarterback to Mike Quinn, attempting just one pass. Due to an injury to Quinn, Arellanes made his first start in the 1998 World Bowl, leading the Fire to a 34–10 victory over the Frankfurt Galaxy, the first championship in team history. He completed 12 of 18 passes for 263 yards and three touchdowns and was named the game's Most Valuable Player. He returned to the Seahawks but was released on August 26, following the 1998 preseason, before rejoining the Fire for the 1999 season, where he completed 80 of 151 passes for 1,325 yards with 15 touchdowns and four interceptions. He also led the league with a 96-yard touchdown pass and a 104.9 passer rating, while ranking second in passing touchdowns.

=== Carolina Cobras ===
Arellanes signed with the Carolina Cobras of the Arena Football League for the 2000 season. The Cobras were an expansion franchise in their inaugural season. Arellanes was named the starting quarterback to begin the year. In Week 1 against the Florida Bobcats, he completed 25 of 41 passes for 257 yards with four touchdowns and two interceptions in a 61–53 loss. The following week against the Los Angeles Avengers, Arellanes led the Cobras to a 58–50 victory, the first in franchise history. He completed 18 of 34 passes for 231 yards and four touchdowns, while also scoring a game-sealing 10-yard rushing touchdown in the final minute. In the following game against the Orlando Predators, Arellanes was replaced in the second half by Carlos Garay after completing 6 of 13 passes for 85 yards with one touchdown and one interception in a 56–28 loss. He appeared in two additional games before being traded. Overall with Carolina, he appeared in five games, completing 64 of 122 passes for 722 yards with 10 touchdowns and six interceptions.

=== Florida Bobcats ===
On May 31, 2000, Arellanes was traded to the Florida Bobcats along with Jack Jackson in exchange for Fred McNair and Dary Myricks. Following the trade, general manager Rick Buffington called Arellanes “the future of our organization.” Following a bye week, Arellanes made his Bobcats debut against the Tampa Bay Storm, completing two of three passes for 19 yards with an interception. The following week against the Nashville Kats, Arellanes made his first start but was quickly pulled after completing three of seven passes for 16 yards and an interception. The next game, he replaced ineffective starter Clemente Gordon against the Los Angeles Avengers, going 17 of 41 for 280 yards and four touchdowns in a 63–49 loss. Arellanes was named the starter the following week against the Albany Firebirds, completing 30 of 41 passes for 344 yards with six touchdowns and two interceptions in a 55–45 loss. Later in the season, he split time with quarterback Todd Hammel.

=== Orlando Rage ===
On October 29, 2000, Arellanes was selected by the San Francisco Demons in the 11th round, 86th overall, of the 2001 XFL draft. He was later acquired by the Orlando Rage following a season-ending injury to Jeff Brohm. Rage head coach Galen Hall had previously coached Arellanes with the Rhein Fire. He did not appear in an XFL game until the semifinal matchup against the Demons. Trailing 19–16 in the fourth quarter, he replaced starter Brian Kuklick. His first pass of the season was intercepted and returned for a touchdown, and on the next drive he fumbled a snap. Trailing by 10, Arellanes converted a third-and-27 before throwing a 55-yard touchdown pass to Dialleo Burks. He then completed the XFL’s first postseason three-point conversion pass to Mario Bailey under a then-new league rule. However, the defense was unable to regain possession, and the Rage lost 26–25. Arellanes finished the game completing four of eight passes for 115 yards with one touchdown and one interception.

=== Rhein Fire (second stint) ===
Following the XFL season, Arellanes joined the Rhein Fire of NFL Europe. In the season finale against the Scotland Claymores, he saw his most extensive action, throwing a 64-yard touchdown pass to Michael Lewis in a 34–21 loss. On the season, he completed 9 of 21 passes for 171 yards with one touchdown and one interception.

== Career statistics ==
=== Professional ===
==== NFLE ====
Year	Team	Games			Passing								Rushing			
Year	Team	GP	GS	Record	Cmp	Att	Pct	Yds	Y/A	TD	Int	Rtg	Att	Yds	Avg	TD
1998	Rhein	?	0	—	0	1	0.0	0	0.0	0	0	39.6	1	6	6.0	0
1999	Rhein	7	6	5–1	80	151	53.0	1,325	8.8	15	4	104.9	16	56	3.5	2
2001	Rhein	?	0	—	9	21	42.9	171	8.1	1	1	67.8	0	0	0.0	0
Career		?	6	5–1	89	173	51.4	1,496	8.6	16	5	99.8	17	62	3.7	2
