= Jarious Jackson =

American gridiron football player and coach (born 1977)

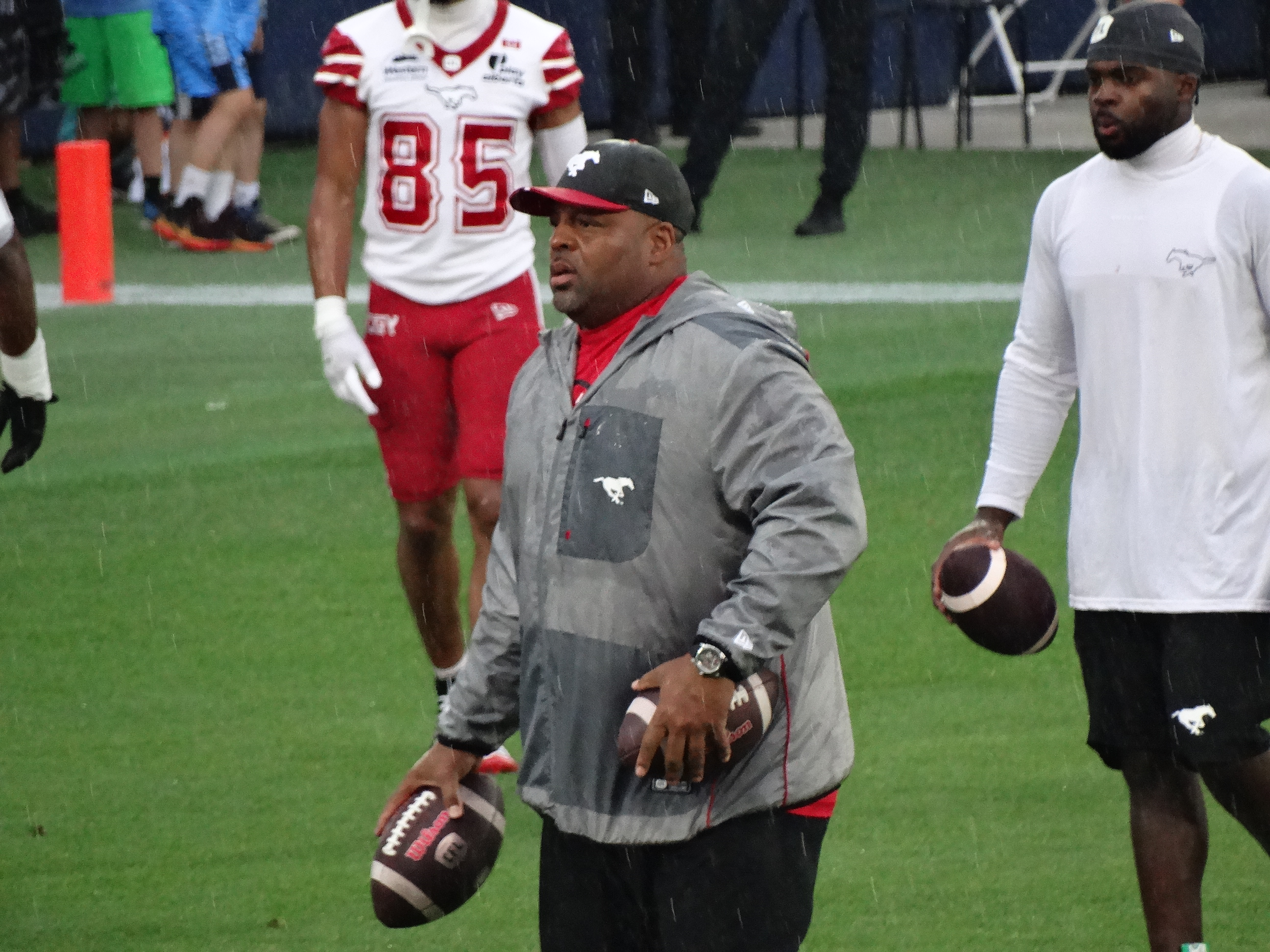
- Jackson with the Calgary Stampeders in 2026

Calgary Stampeders
- Title: Quarterbacks coach

Personal information
- Born: May 3, 1977 (age 49); Tupelo, Mississippi, U.S.
- Listed height: 6 ft 0 in (1.83 m)
- Listed weight: 236 lb (107 kg)

Career information
- Position: Quarterback (No. 7, 12)
- High school: Tupelo (MS)
- College: Notre Dame
- NFL draft: 2000: 7th round, 214th overall pick

Career history

Playing
- 2000: Denver Broncos
- 2001: Barcelona Dragons
- 2001–2003: Denver Broncos
- 2004–2011: BC Lions
- 2012: Toronto Argonauts

Coaching
- 2013: BC Lions (QB coach)
- 2014–2015: Edmonton Eskimos (QB coach/Passing Game Coordinator/Player Development)
- 2016–2017: Saskatchewan Roughriders (QB coach/Passing Game Coordinator/Player Development)
- 2018–2019: BC Lions (Offensive coordinator/QB coach)
- 2020–2021: Toronto Argonauts (Offensive coordinator/QB coach)
- 2022–2023: Edmonton Elks (Passing Game Coordinator/QB coach)
- 2023–2024: Edmonton Elks (Offensive Coordinator/QB coach)
- 2024: Edmonton Elks (Head coach - Interim)
- 2025: Winnipeg Blue Bombers (QB coach)
- 2026–present: Calgary Stampeders (QB coach)

Awards and highlights
- 4× Grey Cup champion (2006, 2011, 2012, 2015)

Career NFL statistics
- Passing attempts: 22
- Passing completions: 11
- Completion percentage: 50.0%
- TD–INT: 0–1
- Passing yards: 11
- Passer rating: 46.4
- Stats at Pro Football Reference

Career CFL statistics
- Comp. / Att.: 571 / 1,054
- Completion %: 54.2
- TD-INT: 55–38
- Passing yards: 7,878
- Passer rating: 80.8
- Rushing yards: 1,170
- Rushing touchdowns: 11
- Stats at CFL.ca (archived)

Jarious K. Jackson (born May 3, 1977) is an American professional football coach and former player who is the quarterbacks coach for the Calgary Stampeders of the Canadian Football League (CFL). He was the interim head coach of the Edmonton Elks in 2024. He has also been a coach for the Toronto Argonauts, Saskatchewan Roughriders, BC Lions, and Winnipeg Blue Bombers. Jackson played professionally as a quarterback in the CFL for eight seasons with the Lions and one year with the Argonauts where he won three Grey Cup championships in 2006, 2011, and 2012. He was also a member of the Denver Broncos (NFL), to whom he was drafted 214th overall in the 2000 NFL draft, and the Barcelona Dragons (NFL Europe). Jackson played college football for the Notre Dame Fighting Irish.

== Early life ==
Jackson attended Tupelo High School in Tupelo, Mississippi, and was a letterman in football, basketball, and track. In football, he won SuperPrep All-America honors.

== College career ==
Jackson attended the University of Notre Dame, where he was a two-year starter and set school single-season records for passing yards (2,753), completions (184), and attempts (316) as a senior during the 1999 season. In the process, he broke the yardage mark held by the legendary Joe Theismann. (All of Jackson's records were subsequently broken by Brady Quinn.) Jackson also threw for 17 touchdowns during his senior year, ranking third behind Ron Powlus and Rick Mirer. He was second on the team in rushing with 140 carries for 464 yards (3.3 avg) and 7 scores.

== Professional career ==
Pre-draft measurables
Height	Weight	40-yard dash	10-yard split	20-yard split	Broad jump
6 ft 0 1/2 in (1.84 m)	226 lb (103 kg)	4.68 s	1.61 s	2.71 s	9 ft 1 in (2.77 m)
All values from NFL Combine

=== Denver Broncos ===
Jackson was drafted in the seventh round of the 2000 NFL draft, 214th overall, by the Denver Broncos. Pro scouts projected that Jackson could develop into a solid NFL quarterback if placed into the right system. However, after four seasons as a Bronco backup, he saw action in only five games, completing 11 of 22 passes for 114 yards.

=== Barcelona Dragons ===
Jackson also spent one season (2001) in Barcelona, as part of NFL Europe, where he competed in the 2001 World Bowl.

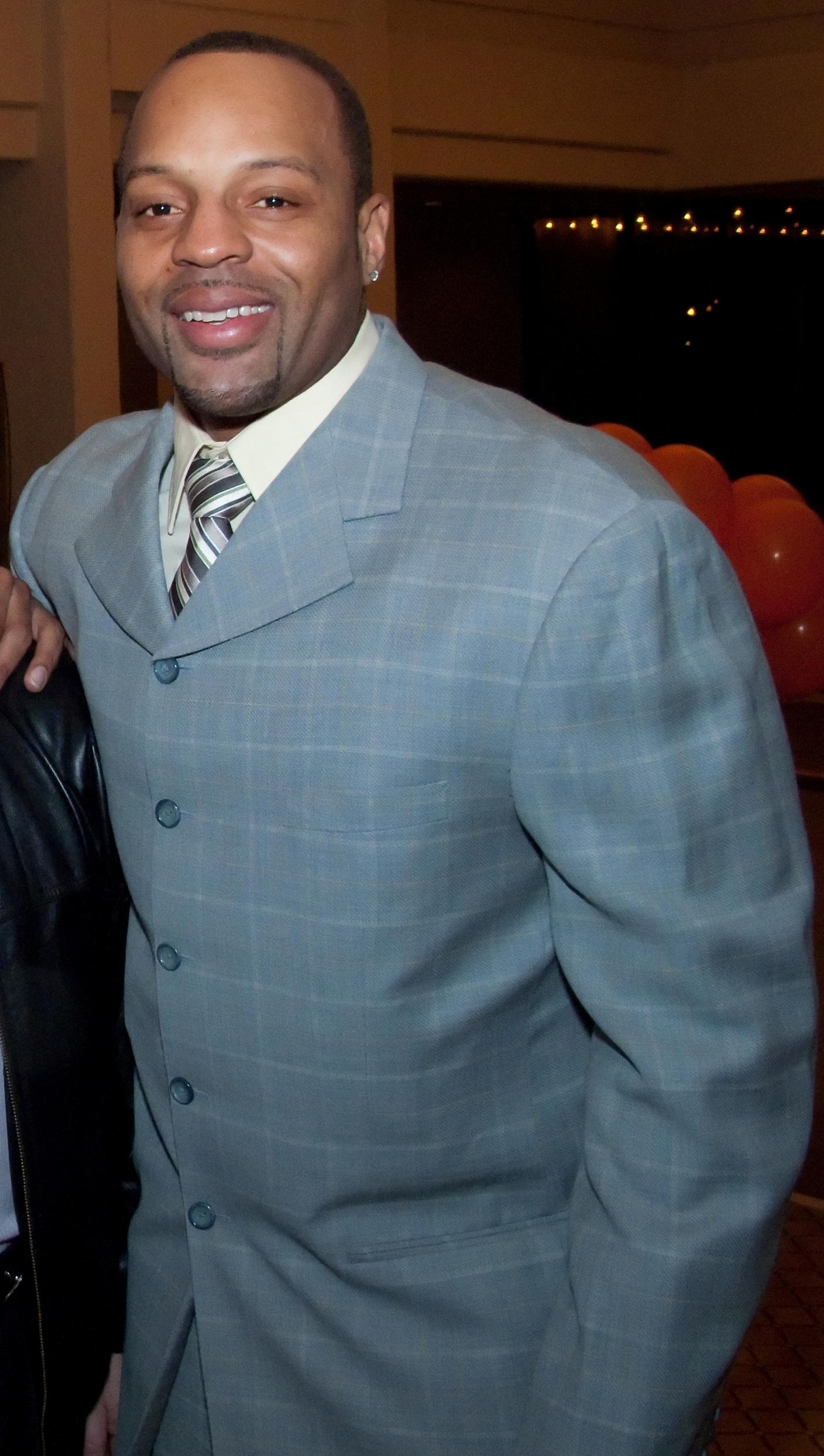
Jackson in 2009.

=== BC Lions ===
In 2004, Jackson signed onto the practice squad of the BC Lions in the CFL. He began 2005 on the practice squad as the fourth-string quarterback, but was elevated to the active roster when CFL superstars Dave Dickenson and Casey Printers went down with injuries, followed by third-stringer Buck Pierce. He saw action in 2 games, had 3 completions out of 6 attempts for a total of 30 yards and rushed four times for a total of 35 yards.

At the beginning of 2006 season, Jackson began as the third-string quarterback, behind Dickenson and Buck Pierce. However, with alternating injuries to Dickenson and Pierce, he made appearances in all but the final regular season game. 2007 proved, however, to be Jackson's break-out season as he became starting quarterback when Dickenson and Pierce were both out with injuries. For the 11 games Jackson was starting, he had a record of 9–2, threw for 2,553 yards, 18 touchdowns on 167 completions and 10 interceptions. On February 4, 2008, Jackson re-signed with the Lions 12 days before qualifying as a free-agent. At the beginning of the 2008 season, he was the back-up to Buck Pierce, but started some games. His only pass in the Western semi-final was a touchdown toss to Geroy Simon.

He was released by the Lions on February 1, 2012.

=== Toronto Argonauts ===
On February 22, 2012, it was announced that Jackson had signed a two-year contract with the Toronto Argonauts. He dressed in all 18 games, starting in four, and was a member of the 100th Grey Cup winning team while throwing a touchdown pass in that game. On February 4, 2013, he was released by the Toronto Argonauts.

Shortly after his release from the Argonauts, it was announced that Jackson would sign a one-day contract with the BC Lions so that he could retire as a Lion.

== Coaching career ==
Immediately upon retiring it was announced that Jackson would then begin his coaching career as the quarterbacks coach for the Lions. After coaching in BC for one year (2013) he spent the next couple seasons as the quarterbacks coach for both the Edmonton Eskimos and Saskatchewan Roughriders before being named the BC Lions' Offensive Coordinator for the 2018 season. He retained the position for the 2019 BC Lions season, but after a disappointing year, his contract was not renewed for 2020.

On February 6, 2020, it was announced that Jackson was joining the Toronto Argonauts as the team's offensive coordinator and quarterbacks coach. The 2020 CFL season was cancelled, but Jackson coached for the Argonauts in 2021 where the team finished in first place in the East Division.

On January 4, 2022, Jackson formally joined the Edmonton Elks as the team's pass game coordinator and quarterbacks coach. He retained the same role to begin the 2023 season, but after an 0–8 start to the season, Jackson was promoted to offensive coordinator on July 31, 2023, replacing Stephen McAdoo.

On July 15, 2024, following the dismissal of head coach, Chris Jones, Jackson was named interim head coach while retaining his play-calling duties. He posted a 7–6 record in the remaining 13 regular season games, but the Elks failed to qualify for the playoffs for the fourth consecutive year. He was not selected as the head coach for the 2025 season following the hire of Mark Kilam. He was also not retained on Kilam's staff.

On February 4, 2025, it was announced that Jackson had been named the quarterbacks coach for the Winnipeg Blue Bombers.

The Calgary Stampeders announced on January 5, 2026, that Jackson had joined their coaching staff as their quarterbacks coach.

== Career statistics ==
=== Playing career ===
==== Professional ====
		Passing								Rushing
Year	Team	Games	Att	Comp	Pct	Yards	TD	Int	Rating	Att	Yards	Avg	Long	TD	Fumb
2000	DEN	2	1	0	0.0	0	0	0	39.6	1	−1	−1.0	−1	0	0
2001	BAR	10	223	125	56.1	1,544	13	6	85.9	43	287	6.7	21	2
2001	DEN	1	12	7	58.3	73	0	0	76.0	5	7	1.4		0	2
2002	DEN	1	0	0	0.0	0	0	0	0	0	0	0.0	0	0	0
2003	DEN	1	9	4	44.4	41	0	1	18.5	1	9	9.0	9	0	0
2004	BC	0	0	0	0	0	0	0	0	0	0	0	0	0	0
2005	BC	8	6	3	50.0	60	0	0	64.6	4	35	8.8	21	0	0
2006	BC	18	79	37	46.8	477	3	2	68.4	46	137	3.0	15	1	0
2007	BC	18	304	167	54.9	2,553	18	10	88.9	49	265	5.4	18	3	9
2008	BC	18	288	158	54.9	2,164	17	10	84.3	63	362	5.7	25	2	4
2009	BC	10	155	90	58.1	1,252	12	8	88.4	32	143	4.5	14	2	5
2010	BC	18	48	26	54.2	293	0	3	46.6	11	26	2.4	7	0	0
2011	BC	18	39	18	46.2	263	1	2	55.8	22	80	3.6	17	0	2
2012	TOR	18	135	72	53.3	846	4	3	73.3	42	122	2.9	15	3	0
CFL totals		126	1,054	571	54.2	7,878	55	38	80.8	269	1,170	4.3	25	11	20

==== College ====
Year	Team	GP	Passing								Rushing			
Year	Team	GP	Cmp	Att	Pct	Yds	Avg	TD	Int	Rtg	Att	Yds	Avg	TD
1996	Notre Dame	6	10	15	66.7	181	12.1	3	0	234.0	11	16	1.5	0
1997	Notre Dame	7	8	17	44.1	146	8.6	1	1	126.8	8	36	4.5	3
1998	Notre Dame	11	104	188	55.3	1,740	9.3	13	6	149.5	113	441	3.9	3
1999	Notre Dame	12	184	316	58.2	2,753	8.7	17	14	140.3	140	464	3.3	7
Career		36	306	536	57.1	4,820	9.0	34	21	145.7	272	957	3.5	13

=== CFL coaching record ===
Team	Year	Regular season					Postseason		
Team	Year	Won	Lost	Ties	Win %	Finish	Won	Lost	Result
EDM	2024	7	6	0	.538	4th in West Division	–	–	Did Not Qualify
Total		7	6	0	.538	0 West Division; Championships	–	–	0 Grey Cups
