= 2001 Scottish Claymores season =

NFL Europe team season

- General manager: Steve Livingstone
- Head coach: Gene Dahlquist
- Home stadium: Hampden Park

Results
- Record: 4–6
- Division place: 4th
- Playoffs: Did not qualify

The 2001 Scottish Claymores season was the seventh season for the franchise in the NFL Europe League (NFLEL). The team was led by head coach Gene Dahlquist in his first year, and played its home games at Hampden Park in Glasgow, Scotland. They finished the regular season in fourth place with a record of four wins and six losses.

== Offseason ==
=== Free agent draft ===
2001 Scottish Claymores NFLEL free agent draft selections
Draft order			Player name	Position	College
Round	Choice	Overall	Player name	Position	College
1	5	5	Damon Nivens	OL	Southern
2	5	11	Chris Watton	G	Baylor
3	2	14	Jamal Brooks	LB	Hampton
4	5	23	Brian Connolly	G	US Military Academy
5	2	26	Renard Cox	CB	Maryland
6	5	35	Jim Stull	T	Delaware
7	2	38	Tony Ortiz	LB	Nebraska
8	5	47	Stevan Fontana	TE	Northern Arizona
9	2	50	Montee Foote	LB	Hampton
10	4	58	Lionel Hayes	QB	Grambling State

== Personnel ==
=== Staff ===
2001 Scottish Claymores staff
Front office: General manager – Steve Livingstone; Head coaches: Head coach – Gene Dahlquist; Offensive coaches: Offensive coordinator/offensive line – Mike Deal; Wide receivers – Kevin O’Neal; National coach/tight ends – Stephen McCusker	Defensive coaches: Defensive coordinator/linebackers – Ray Woodard; Defensive line – Jim Tomsula; Defensive backs/special teams – Richard Kent; Strength and conditioning: Strength and conditioning – Tom Bender

=== Roster ===
2001 Scottish Claymores final roster
Quarterbacks: 7 Gus Ornstein; 14 Clint Stoerner; Running backs: 35 Omar Bacon; 27 Anthony Gray; 28 Vaughn Sanders; Wide receivers: 83 Corey Allen; 1 Dante Hall; 80 Lonny Mitchell; 15 Gerald Williams; Tight ends: 88 Stevan Fontana; 85 Randy Palmer; 87 James Whalen	Offensive linemen: 67 Jay Humphrey C; 68 John Jacobs G/T; 65 Eric King G/C; 66 Kendell Mack G; 75 Damon Nivens T; 72 Craig Robeen T; 61 Chris Watton G; Defensive linemen: 74 Antonio Dingle NT; 96 Doug Miller NT; 98 Bryant Shaw DE; 92 Jabbar Threats DE; 99 Chris Ward DE	Linebackers: 55 Jamal Brooks OLB; 54 London Dunlap OLB; 53 Keith Miller ILB; 52 Tony Ortiz OLB; 44 Dusty Renfro ILB; 50 Casey Tisdale OLB; Defensive backs: 38 Renard Cox CB; 43 Brian Gray CB; 45 Reggie Hunt S; 29 Central McClellion CB; 46 Earl Riley S; 29 Jermaine Smith CB; 28 Nate Terry CB; 20 Eric Whitfield S; Special teams: 12 Brad Costello P; 13 Chad Holleman K; 11 Don Icsman P	National players: 21 (England) Rowelle Blenman CB/S; 89 (England) Jason Byworth WR; 81 (Scotland) Scott Couper WR; 91 (Scotland) Robert Flickinger DE; 8 (England) Rob Hart K; 51 (Japan) Shingo Hiruma ILB; 26 (England) Stephen Hutchinson RB; 30 (Japan) Kohei Satomi CB/S; Rookies in italics

== Schedule ==
Week	Date	Kickoff (Note: All times local to where the game was played.)	Opponent	Results		Game site	Attendance
Week	Date	Kickoff	Opponent	Final score	Team record	Game site	Attendance
1	Saturday, 21 April	3:00 p.m.	Frankfurt Galaxy	W 24–21	1–0	Hampden Park	16,387
2	Saturday, 28 April	7:00 p.m.	at Amsterdam Admirals	L 10–14	1–1	Amsterdam ArenA	12,516
3	Sunday, 6 May	4:00 p.m.	Berlin Thunder	W 28–21	2–1	Hampden Park	10,419
4	Saturday, 12 May	7:00 p.m.	at Frankfurt Galaxy	L 17–27	2–2	Waldstadion	33,437
5	Sunday, 20 May	4:00 p.m.	at Rhein Fire	L 3–10	2–3	Rheinstadion	30,211
6	Sunday, 27 May	4:00 p.m.	Amsterdam Admirals	W 17–7	3–3	Hampden Park	15,983
7	Saturday, 2 June	6:00 p.m.	at Berlin Thunder	L 19–27	3–4	Jahn-Sportpark	8,917
8	Saturday, 10 June	4:00 p.m.	Barcelona Dragons	L 9–14	3–5	Hampden Park	14,483
9	Saturday, 16 June	5:00 p.m.	at Barcelona Dragons	L 7–26	3–6	Estadi Olímpic de Montjuïc	10,180
10	Saturday, 23 June	4:00 p.m.	Rhein Fire	W 34–21	4–6	Hampden Park	12,251

== Standings ==
NFL Europe League
Team	W	L	T	PCT	PF	PA	Home	Road	STK
Barcelona Dragons	8	2	0	.800	252	191	5–0	3–2	L1
Berlin Thunder	6	4	0	.600	270	239	4–1	2–3	W2
Rhein Fire	5	5	0	.500	174	179	4–1	1–4	L1
Scottish Claymores	4	6	0	.400	168	188	4–1	0–5	W1
Amsterdam Admirals	4	6	0	.400	194	226	4–1	0–5	L3
Frankfurt Galaxy	3	7	0	.300	199	234	3–2	0–5	W1

== Game summaries ==
=== Week 1: vs Frankfurt Galaxy ===
Week One: Frankfurt Galaxy at Scottish Claymores – Game summary

Quarter	1	2	3	4	Total
Frankfurt	7	0	7	7	21
Scotland	7	3	14	0	24

at Hampden Park, Glasgow, Scotland

- Date: Saturday, 21 April
- Game time: 3:07 p.m. BST
- Game attendance: 16,387
- Referee: Mark Baltz
