= Spergon Wynn =

American gridiron football player (born 1978)

No. 13, 3
- Position: Quarterback

Personal information
- Born: August 10, 1978 (age 48); Houston, Texas, U.S.
- Listed height: 6 ft 3 in (1.91 m)
- Listed weight: 226 lb (103 kg)

Career information
- High school: Episcopal (Bellaire, Texas)
- College: Minnesota (1995–1997); Southwest Texas State (1998–1999)
- NFL draft: 2000: 6th round, 183rd overall pick

Career history
- Cleveland Browns (2000); Amsterdam Admirals (2001); Minnesota Vikings (2001); BC Lions (2003–2004); Winnipeg Blue Bombers (2005); Toronto Argonauts (2006)

Career NFL statistics
- Passing attempts: 152
- Passing completions: 70
- Completion percentage: 46.1%
- TD–INT: 1–7
- Passing yards: 585
- Passer rating: 39.5
- Stats at Pro Football Reference

Career CFL statistics
- Completion percentage: 65
- TD–INT: 11–5
- Passing yards: 2,003
- Passer rating: 96.6
- Stats at CFL.ca (archived)

Spergon Wynn III (born August 10, 1978) is an American former professional football player who was a quarterback in the National Football League (NFL) and Canadian Football League (CFL). He played college football for the Southwest Texas State Bobcats and was selected by the Cleveland Browns in the sixth round of the 2000 NFL draft. Wynn also played for the Amsterdam Admirals, Minnesota Vikings, BC Lions, Winnipeg Blue Bombers and Toronto Argonauts.

== Early life ==
Spergon Wynn III was born on August 10, 1978, in Houston, Texas. He attended Episcopal High School in Bellaire, Texas.

== College career ==
Wynn started his college career playing for the Minnesota Golden Gophers of the University of Minnesota. He later transferred to play quarterback for the Southwest Texas State Bobcats of Southwest Texas State University, now known as Texas State University, between 1998 and 1999. In these two years, Wynn piled up 3,497 yards passing, good for sixth on Southwest Texas State's record books. In 1998, Wynn threw for 1,851 yards and 10 touchdowns. In 1999, Wynn was selected to the All-Southland Conference second-team after throwing for 1,646 yards and 14 touchdowns for the Bobcats.

== Professional career ==
Pre-draft measurables
Height	Weight	Arm length	Hand span	40-yard dash	10-yard split	20-yard split	20-yard shuttle	Three-cone drill	Vertical jump	Broad jump	Wonderlic
6 ft 3 3/8 in (1.91 m)	229 lb (104 kg)	33 1/4 in (0.84 m)	10 in (0.25 m)	4.89 s	1.64 s	2.82 s	4.59 s	7.71 s	34.0 in (0.86 m)	9 ft 0 in (2.74 m)	25
All values from NFL Combine

=== Cleveland Browns ===
Wynn was drafted by the Cleveland Browns in the sixth round (183rd overall) in 2000. He was the sixth quarterback picked in that draft, although chosen before New England drafted Tom Brady. Wynn played for the Browns in 2000, seeing action in seven games, including one start – a 48–0 loss to the Jacksonville Jaguars. With the Browns, Wynn completed 22 of 54 (40.7%) passes for 167 yards, no touchdowns, one interception, and a passer rating of 41.2.

=== Amsterdam Admirals ===
In the summer of 2001, Wynn was sent to NFL Europe to develop his skills. He started for the Amsterdam Admirals, throwing 14 touchdowns and 2,039 yards.

=== Minnesota Vikings ===
On September 2, 2001, Wynn, along with running back Travis Prentice, was traded to the Minnesota Vikings in exchange for draft picks in the 2002 and 2003 drafts. Wynn was a third string backup to Daunte Culpepper and Todd Bouman in the 2001 and 2002 seasons and played in the last three games of the 2001 season, starting two of them because of season-ending injuries to both Culpepper and Bouman. In the Vikings’ next-to-last regular-season game against the Green Bay Packers on December 30, 2001, Wynn threw the only touchdown pass of his NFL career, a 47-yard strike to tight end Byron Chamberlain.

=== BC Lions ===
After failing to move beyond third string with the Vikings, Wynn made his way north to Canada to play for the BC Lions, completing 67 of 99 passes for 894 yards, 6 touchdowns, and one interception. He also rushed for 2 touchdowns and 145 yards on 36 attempts.

=== Winnipeg Blue Bombers ===
On April 13, 2005, Wynn was acquired by the Winnipeg Blue Bombers for a conditional pick in the 2006 CFL draft.

=== Toronto Argonauts ===
Spergon Wynn was traded to the Toronto Argonauts on February 22, 2006, for safety Mike Crumb.

== Career statistics ==
=== Professional ===
Year	Team	GP	Passing							Rushing				
Year	Team	GP	Att	Comp	Pct	Yards	TD	Int	Rtg	Att	Yds	Avg	Lng	TD
2000	CLE	7	54	22	40.7	167	0	1	41.2	3	15	5.0	11	0
2001	AMS	10	337	193	57.3	2,041	14	9	77.8	31	110	3.5	17	0
2001	MIN	3	98	48	49.0	418	1	6	38.6	8	61	7.6	14	0
2003	BC	18	65	46	70.8	626	4	1	115.3	28	126	4.5	31	1
2004	BC	15	34	21	61.8	268	2	0	106.0	8	19	2.4	9	1
2005	WPG	3	0	0	0.0	0	0	0	0.0	0	0	0.0	0	0
2006	TOR	18	147	93	63.3	1,109	5	4	86.2	16	55	3.4	14	1
NFL totals		10	152	70	46.1	585	1	7	39.5	11	76	6.9	14	0
CFL totals		54	246	160	65.0	2,003	11	5	96.6	52	200	3.8	31	3

=== College ===
Season	Team	Passing								Rushing			
Season	Team	Cmp	Att	Pct	Yds	Y/A	TD	Int	Rtg	Att	Yds	Avg	TD
1998	Southwest Texas State	173	284	60.9	1,851	6.5	10	6	123.1	–	–	–	–
1999	Southwest Texas State	161	322	50.0	1,646	5.1	14	13	99.2	94	-49	-0.5	3
Career		334	606	55.1	3,497	5.8	24	19	110.4	94	-49	-0.5	3

== Personal life ==
Wynn is currently an energy broker with Amerex Energy Services in Houston, Texas. He has two sons, Spergon IV and Slaton.
