= 2001 Frankfurt Galaxy season =

Season in the NFL Europe League

- General manager: Tilman Engel
- Head coach: Doug Graber
- Home stadium: Waldstadion

Results
- Record: 3–7
- Division place: 6th
- Playoffs: Did not qualify

The 2001 Frankfurt Galaxy season was the ninth season for the franchise in the NFL Europe League (NFLEL). The team was led by head coach Doug Graber in his first year, and played its home games at Waldstadion in Frankfurt, Germany. They finished the regular season in sixth place with a record of three wins and seven losses.

== Offseason ==
=== Free agent draft ===
2001 Frankfurt Galaxy NFLEL free agent draft selections
Draft order			Player name	Position	College
Round	Choice	Overall	Player name	Position	College
1	2	2	James Grier	DT	Mississippi State
2	2	8	Donald Broomfield	DT	Clemson
3	5	17	Eric Thomas	C	Florida State
4	2	20	Marvin Coley	DE	North Alabama
5	5	29	Gregory Studdard	T	Sam Houston State
6	2	32	Corey Gaines	CB	Tennessee
7	5	41	Jim Beverly	C	East Tennessee State
8	2	44	Jeremy Beutler	LB	Ohio
9	5	53	Chris Cummings	CB	Louisiana State
10	1	55	Julius Jackson	LB	Nebraska
11	3	62	Dan Robinson	QB	Hawaii
12	1	63	Bill Powell	WR	Rutgers

== Personnel ==
=== Staff ===
2001 Frankfurt Galaxy (NFL Europe) staff
Front office: General manager – Tilman Engel; Head coaches: Head Coach/Defensive Backs – Doug Graber; Offensive coaches: Offensive coordinator/quarterbacks/wide receivers – Dwain Painter; Running Backs/special teams – Brian Jenkins; National Coach/tight ends – Alessandro Cinelli; Offensive line – Roger French	Defensive coaches: Defensive coordinator/linebackers – Bob Valesente; Defensive line – Charles Jones; Strength and conditioning: Strength and conditioning – Mike Berezowski

=== Roster ===
2001 Frankfurt Galaxy final roster
Quarterbacks: 13 Neo Aoga; 7 Michael Bishop; 14 Lionel Hayes; 16 Kevin Thompson; Running backs: 21 Brian Edwards; 22 Jabari Jackson; 33 Denvis Manns; 44 Kevin McLeod; Wide receivers: 82 Ricky Hall; 1 Andy McCullough; 87 Damon Savage; 81 Kofi Shuck; Tight ends: 89 Rod Monroe; 84 Pete Muther	Offensive linemen: 64 Robert Barr G; 74 Wilbert Brown C; 73 Josh Rawlings T; 79 Reggie Nelson T; 78 Terrance Simmons G/T; 71 Josh Tucker G; Defensive linemen: 93 Marvin Coley DE; 96 James Grier DT; 91 David Hoelscher DE; 92 Dwight Johnson DT; 77 Jerome King DT; 94 Richard Seals DT; 95 Paul Spicer DE	Linebackers: 59 Jeremy Beutler OLB; 45 Eric Guenther MLB; 58 Kelvin Moses OLB; 55 Gary Stills OLB; 54 Calvin Wilkinson OLB; Defensive backs: 27 Chris Cummings CB; 30 Cory Gaines S; 36 Tony George S; 31 Todd McMillon CB; 28 Terrance Parrish CB; 38 Gary Thompkins S; 20 Corey Walker CB; 29 Jerard White CB; Special teams: 18 Andrew Bayes P; 15 Jim Tarle K	National players: 11 (Germany) Stephan Bauer K; 90 (Germany) Daniel Benetka DT; 50 (Germany) Marcus Bleker MLB; 8 (France) Patrice Kancel RB; 66 (Germany) Andreas Kempchen LS; 2 (Sweden) Ola Kimrin K; 75 (Germany) Marcus Richter DE; 19 (France) Marc Soumah WR; 46 (Turkey) Cüneyt Topcu OLB; Rookies in italics

== Schedule ==
Week	Date	Kickoff (Note: All times local to where the game was played.)	Opponent	Results		Game site	Attendance
Week	Date	Kickoff	Opponent	Final score	Team record	Game site	Attendance
1	Saturday, April 21	3:00 p.m.	at Scottish Claymores	L 21–24	0–1	Hampden Park	16,387
2	Saturday, April 28	7:00 p.m.	Berlin Thunder	L 20–28	0–2	Waldstadion	27,928
3	Saturday, May 5	7:00 p.m.	at Amsterdam Admirals	L 14–28	0–3	Amsterdam ArenA	14,268
4	Saturday, May 12	7:00 p.m.	Scottish Claymores	W 27–17	1–3	Waldstadion	33,437
5	Saturday, May 19	6:00 p.m.	at Berlin Thunder	L 25–34	1–4	Jahn-Sportpark	9,559
6	Sunday, May 27	7:00 p.m.	Rhein Fire	L 5–22	1–5	Waldstadion	30,512
7	Saturday, June 2	5:00 p.m.	at Barcelona Dragons	L 20–31	1–6	Estadi Olímpic de Montjuïc	9,851
8	Saturday, June 9	7:00 p.m.	Amsterdam Admirals	W 28–23	2–6	Waldstadion	29,587
9	Saturday, June 16	7:00 p.m.	at Rhein Fire	L 13–17	2–7	Rheinstadion	51,719
10	Saturday, June 23	7:00 p.m.	Barcelona Dragons	W 26–10	3–7	Waldstadion	31,215

== Standings ==
NFL Europe League
Team	W	L	T	PCT	PF	PA	Home	Road	STK
Barcelona Dragons	8	2	0	.800	252	191	5–0	3–2	L1
Berlin Thunder	6	4	0	.600	270	239	4–1	2–3	W2
Rhein Fire	5	5	0	.500	174	179	4–1	1–4	L1
Scottish Claymores	4	6	0	.400	168	188	4–1	0–5	W1
Amsterdam Admirals	4	6	0	.400	194	226	4–1	0–5	L3
Frankfurt Galaxy	3	7	0	.300	199	234	3–2	0–5	W1

== Game summaries ==
=== Week 1: at Scottish Claymores ===
Week One: Frankfurt Galaxy at Scottish Claymores – Game summary

Quarter	1	2	3	4	Total
Frankfurt	7	0	7	7	21
Scotland	7	3	14	0	24

at Hampden Park, Glasgow, Scotland

- Date: Saturday, April 21
- Game time: 3:07 p.m. BST
- Game attendance: 16,387
- Referee: Mark Baltz
