= Corey Harris (American football, born 1976) =

American football player (born 1976)

No. 36, 26, 40
- Position: Defensive back

Personal information
- Born: November 28, 1976 (age 49); Jacksonville, Florida, U.S.
- Listed height: 5 ft 10 in (1.78 m)
- Listed weight: 187 lb (85 kg)

Career information
- High school: Northside (Warner Robins, Georgia)
- College: North Alabama
- NFL draft: 1999: undrafted

Career history
- New Orleans Saints (1999–2000); Rhein Fire (2001); Kansas City Chiefs (2001–2003)

Career NFL statistics
- Tackles: 28
- Sacks: 1
- Fumble recoveries: 1
- Pass deflections: 6
- Stats at Pro Football Reference

Corey Alan Harris (born November 28, 1976) is an American former professional football player who was a defensive back for five seasons in the National Football League (NFL) with the New Orleans Saints and Kansas City Chiefs. He first played college football for The Citadel Bulldogs before transferring to the North Alabama Lions. Harris was also a member of the Rhein Fire of NFL Europe.

== Early life ==
Harris played high school football at Northside High School in Warner Robins, Georgia, earning all-state honors. He also competed in wrestling for the Eagles, becoming state champion and garnering all-state recognition.

== College career ==
Harris first played college football at the The Citadel from 1995 to 1996. He also wrestled for the Bulldogs. He then played at the University of North Alabama from 1997 to 1998. Harris became a member of the Phi Beta Sigma fraternity as a founding charter member of the Beta Beta Alpha Chapter that was started at the University of North Alabama on December 2, 1998.

== Professional career ==
Harris played in six games, starting one, for the NFL's New Orleans Saints from 1999 to 2000. He was allocated to NFL Europe on February 19, 2001, and played for the Rhein Fire during the 2001 season. He was released by the Saints on May 21, 2001. Harris was signed by the Kansas City Chiefs of the NFL on July 16, 2001. He appeared in 21 games for the Chiefs from 2001 to 2003.

== Coaching career ==
Harris has held various coaching positions in football, wrestling and track and field at several high schools.

== Personal life ==
Harris has worked as a teacher at various high schools.
