= James Whalen (American football) =

American football player (born 1977)

No. 46, 81, 83, 85, 87
- Position: Tight end

Personal information
- Born: December 11, 1977 (age 48); Portland, Oregon, U.S.
- Listed height: 6 ft 2 in (1.88 m)
- Listed weight: 244 lb (111 kg)

Career information
- High school: La Salle (Milwaukie, Oregon)
- College: Kentucky
- NFL draft: 2000: 5th round, 157th overall pick

Career history
- Tampa Bay Buccaneers (2000)*; Dallas Cowboys (2000–2003); → Scottish Claymores (2001); Cincinnati Bengals (2004)*; Philadelphia Eagles (2005)*
- * Offseason or practice squad member only

Awards and highlights
- Consensus All-American (1999); First-team All-SEC (1999); All-NFLE (2001)

Career NFL statistics
- Games played: 26
- Receptions: 17
- Receiving yards: 152
- Stats at Pro Football Reference

James Patrick Whalen Jr. (born December 11, 1977) is an American former professional football player who was a tight end for the Dallas Cowboys of the National Football League (NFL). He played college football for the Kentucky Wildcats, earning consensus All-American honors in 1999.

== Early life ==
Whalen attended La Salle High School in Milwaukie, Oregon. As a sophomore, he became a starter at wide receiver. He posted a combined 75 receptions for 1,300 yards and 25 touchdowns in his second and third years, earning All-league honors each season.

As a senior, he helped his team win the league championship, while finishing with 68 catches for 1,502 yards and 18 touchdowns, receiving Tri-Valley League Player of the Year and All-state honors. He was a second-team All-state basketball selection at forward as a senior. He also lettered as a third baseman and pitcher in baseball.

== College career ==
Whalen moved on to Shasta College, where he had one undistinguished season with 19 receptions for 154 yards and one touchdown. The next year, he walked on at the University of Kentucky, after showing head coach Hal Mumme a highlight video tape made by his mother.

As a sophomore, he had 7 receptions for 66 yards. The next year, he was converted from wide receiver to tight end, recording 23 receptions for 239 yards and 3 touchdowns.

As a senior he had a breakout season, being recognized as a consensus first-team All-American, after registering 90 receptions for 1,019 yards and 10 touchdowns, leading the tight ends in all three categories nationally. He set NCAA records for most receptions in a season and most receptions per game (8.2) by a tight end. His 90 receptions broke the school's single-season record and became the first tight end and second Kentucky player to top 1,000 receiving yards in a season. His 10 receiving touchdowns in a single-season at the time ranked second in school history.

In 2016, he was named a Kentucky SEC Football Legend.

== Professional career ==
=== Tampa Bay Buccaneers ===
Whalen was selected by the Tampa Bay Buccaneers in the fifth round (157th overall pick) of the 2000 NFL draft, after dropping because it was considered he lacked size and speed. He was waived on August 27, after being passed on the depth chart by undrafted free agent Todd Yoder.

=== Dallas Cowboys ===
On August 30, 2000, the Dallas Cowboys signed Whalen to their practice squad and promoted him to the active roster on December 5, for the last 3 games of the season.

The next year, he was allocated to the Scottish Claymores of NFL Europe, where he led the league in receptions (66) and also had 691 receiving yards (second in the league) and 3 touchdowns. In 2001, he was declared inactive for the season opener. On September 22, he was placed on the injured reserve list with a strained right Achilles.

In 2002, he was a core special teams player and tallied 15 tackles (fourth on the team). In 2003, he suffered hamstring and ankle injuries that limited him to playing in only 9 games (2 starts) and registering 7 special teams tackles. He was released on July 26, 2004.

=== Cincinnati Bengals ===
On July 28, 2004, the Cincinnati Bengals signed him as a free agent. He was cut on September 5.

=== Philadelphia Eagles ===
On February 22, 2005, he was signed as a free agent by the Philadelphia Eagles to compete for a backup tight end position. He was released on August 28.
