= 2001 Rhein Fire season =

NFL Europe team season

- General manager: Alexander Leibkind
- Head coach: Pete Kuharchek
- Home stadium: Rheinstadion

Results
- Record: 5–5
- Division place: 3rd
- Playoffs: did not qualify

The 2001 Rhein Fire season was the seventh season for the franchise in the NFL Europe League (NFLEL). The team was led by head coach Pete Kuharchek in his first year, and played its home games at Rheinstadion in Düsseldorf, Germany. They finished the regular season in third place with a record of five wins and five losses.

== Offseason ==
=== Free agent draft ===
2001 Rhein Fire NFLEL free agent draft selections
Draft order			Player name	Position	College
Round	Choice	Overall	Player name	Position	College
1	6	6	Terrell Jurineack	DE	Missouri
2	6	12	Shane Cook	T	Colorado
3	1	13	Keith Short	C	Virginia Tech
4	6	24	James Roscoe	DE	Clark Atlanta
5	1	25	Antoine McNutt	G	Tennessee State
6	6	36	Otis Grant	DE	Houston
7	1	37	Ronnie Nicks	LB	Notre Dame
8	6	48	Corey Bailey	G	Fordham
9	1	49	Julian Duncan	LB	Rice
10	5	59	P. J. Franklin	WR	Tulane
11	1	60	Kevin Monroe	CB	East Carolina
12	3	65	LeShun Daniels	G	Ohio State

== Personnel ==
=== Staff ===
2001 Rhein Fire staff
Front office: General manager – Alexander Leibkind; Head coaches: Head coach/defensive coordinator – Pete Kuharchek; Offensive coaches: Offensive coordinator/quarterbacks – Joe Clark; Running backs/wide receivers – Booker Brooks; Offensive line – Mike Bender	Defensive coaches: Defensive line/special teams – Ed O'Neil; National coach/linebackers – Jörn Maier; Defensive backs – Adrian White; Strength and conditioning: Strength and conditioning – Brian Ferguson

=== Roster ===
2001 Rhein Fire final roster
Quarterbacks: 16 Jim Arellanes; 19 Giovanni Carmazzi (IR); 18 Phil Stambaugh; Running backs: 44 Jason Brookins (IR); 33 DeMario Brown; 20 Pepe Pearson; Wide receivers: 86 Dwight Carter; 80 Andre Cooper; 87 Eddie Hardaway; 88 Michael Lewis; 82 Shannon Myers; 83 Joe Perez; Tight ends: 89 Johnny Huggins; 87 Adam Newman	Offensive linemen: 75 Cory Bailey G; 67 John Blick T; 66 Brian Connolly T; 78 LeShun Daniels T; 63 Michael Early C; 79 Antoine McNutt G; 67 Nick O'Brien G; Defensive linemen: 91 Julian Duncan DE; 98 Daniel Greer DT; 99 Kelly Gregg DT; 94 Gaylon Hyder DT; 93 Terrell Jurineack DE; 95 James Roscoe DE; 96 Mark Word DE	Linebackers: 51 Paris Johnson OLB; 54 Ronnie Nicks MLB; 56 Mike Sands OLB; 57 Jamel Smith OLB; 53 Scott Zimmerman MLB; Defensive backs: 40 Deke Cooper S; 38 Steve Gleason S; 30 Derrick Gardner CB; 24 Corey Harris CB; 35 Clarence LeBlanc S; 36 Deshone Mallard CB; 26 Jordan Younger CB; Special teams: 14 James Tuthill K; 2 Rodney Williams P	National players: 5 (Japan) Akihito Amaya WR; 10 (Germany) Manfred Burgsmüller K; 50 (Germany) Anthony Doghmi OLB; 23 (Germany) Sascha Gehloff S; 72 (Germany) Bastian Lano DE; 21 (Nigeria) Oyeniran Olalere Odunayo Ojo RB; 8 (Japan) Naoki Sasano WR; 58 (Japan) Masaki Tokimoto OLB; Rookies in italics

== Schedule ==
Week	Date	Kickoff (Note: All times local to where the game was played.)	Opponent	Results		Game site	Attendance
Week	Date	Kickoff	Opponent	Final score	Team record	Game site	Attendance
1	Saturday, April 21	7:00 p.m.	Amsterdam Admirals	W 24–20	1–0	Rheinstadion	31,437
2	Saturday, April 28	5:00 p.m.	at Barcelona Dragons	L 12–24	1–1	Estadi Olímpic de Montjuïc	8,423
3	Saturday, May 5	7:00 p.m.	Barcelona Dragons	L 21–27	1–2	Rheinstadion	30,984
4	Saturday, May 12	6:00 p.m.	at Berlin Thunder	L 17–23	1–3	Jahn-Sportpark	9,148
5	Sunday, May 20	4:00 p.m.	Scottish Claymores	W 10–3	2–3	Rheinstadion	30,211
6	Sunday, May 27	7:00 p.m.	at Frankfurt Galaxy	W 22–5	3–3	Waldstadion	30,512
7	Saturday, June 2	7:00 p.m.	at Amsterdam Admirals	L 14–17	3–4	Amsterdam ArenA	13,823
8	Sunday, June 10	7:00 p.m.	Berlin Thunder	W 16–13	4–4	Rheinstadion	30,701
9	Saturday, June 16	7:00 p.m.	Frankfurt Galaxy	W 17–13	5–4	Rheinstadion	51,719
10	Saturday, June 23	3:00 p.m.	at Scottish Claymores	L 21–34	5–5	Hampden Park	12,251

== Standings ==
NFL Europe League
Team	W	L	T	PCT	PF	PA	Home	Road	STK
Barcelona Dragons	8	2	0	.800	252	191	5–0	3–2	L1
Berlin Thunder	6	4	0	.600	270	239	4–1	2–3	W2
Rhein Fire	5	5	0	.500	174	179	4–1	1–4	L1
Scottish Claymores	4	6	0	.400	168	188	4–1	0–5	W1
Amsterdam Admirals	4	6	0	.400	194	226	4–1	0–5	L3
Frankfurt Galaxy	3	7	0	.300	199	234	3–2	0–5	W1

== Game summaries ==
=== Week 1: vs Amsterdam Admirals ===
Week One: Amsterdam Admirals at Rhein Fire – Game summary

Quarter	1	2	3	4	Total
Amsterdam	13	0	7	0	20
Rhein	7	7	7	3	24

at Rheinstadion, Düsseldorf, Germany

- Date: Saturday, April 21
- Game time: 7:06 p.m. CEST
- Game attendance: 31,437
- Referee: Terry McAulay
