= 2001 Berlin Thunder season =

3rd season of German American football team in NFL Europe

- General manager: Michael Lang
- Head coach: Peter Vaas
- Home stadium: Jahn-Sportpark

Results
- Record: 6–4
- Division place: 2nd
- Playoffs: World Bowl IX champion

The 2001 Berlin Thunder season was the third season for the franchise in the NFL Europe League (NFLEL). The team was led by head coach Peter Vaas in his second year, and played its home games at Jahn-Sportpark in Berlin, Germany. They finished the regular season in second place with a record of six wins and four losses. In World Bowl IX, Berlin defeated the Barcelona Dragons 24–17. The victory marked the franchise's first World Bowl championship.

== Offseason ==
=== Free agent draft ===
2001 Berlin Thunder NFLEL free agent draft selections
Draft order			Player name	Position	College
Round	Choice	Overall	Player name	Position	College
1	1	1	Lamanzer Williams	DE	Minnesota
2	1	7	Scott Pospisil	DL	Iowa
3	6	18	Jay Hill	CB	Utah
4	1	19	Joe Wesley	LB	Louisiana State
5	6	30	Jason Mills	T	Tulsa
6	1	31	Allen Mogridge	G	North Carolina
7	6	42	Robert Barzilauskas	DT	Valdosta State
8	1	43	Jamie Oats	CB	South Carolina State
9	6	54	Corey Taylor	RB	Georgetown College

== Personnel ==
=== Staff ===
2001 Berlin Thunder staff
Front office: General manager – Michael Lang; Head coaches: Head coach – Peter Vaas; Offensive coaches: Offensive coordinator/offensive line – Bob Bicknell; National coach/running backs – Shuan Fatah; Wide receivers – Bobby Beers	Defensive coaches: Defensive coordinator/linebackers – David Duggan; Defensive line – Lee Johnson; Defensive backs – Stephen Braggs; Strength and conditioning: Strength and conditioning – Jake Marxhausen

=== Roster ===
2001 Berlin Thunder final roster
Quarterbacks: 16 Leon Murray; 12 Jonathan Quinn; Running backs: 38 Ricky Brown; 34 Madre Hill; 33 Rodnick Phillips; Wide receivers: 81 Corey Bridges; 19 Demetrius Brown; 87 Kenny Coutain; 18 Dwaune Jones; 83 Ahmad Merritt; Tight ends: 89 Carlos Nuno; 85 Scot Osborne	Offensive linemen: 77 Rome Douglas T; 63 Steve Estes G; 65 Thomas Guynes G; 60 Jay Hagood T; 62 Ryan Kalich C; 76 David Walden G; 67 T. J. Washington G; 72 Sammy Williams T; Defensive linemen: 95 Lavell Ellis DE; 90 Jon Harris DT; 75 Scott Pospisil DT; 91 Jesse Warren DE; 93 Thomas Washington DT; 92 Antwone Young DE	Linebackers: 96 Marc Megna OLB; 55 Joe O'Neill MLB; 52 Dax Strohmeyer OLB; 56 Joe Wesley MLB; Defensive backs: 23 Wade Davis CB; 40 Billy Gustin S; 24 Dee Moronkola CB; 27 Dwayne Stukes CB/S; 22 James Watkins S; 21 Payton Williams CB; Special teams: 1 Scott Bentley K; 2 Brian Moorman P	National players: 86 (Germany) Ulf Behre WR; 20 (Germany) Lelan Brickus S; 80 (Germany) Marico Gregersen WR; 84 (Germany) Jörg Heckenbach WR; 9 (Germany) Axel Kruse K; 36 (Germany) Kim Kuci RB; 57 (Germany) Kalle Stubbe OLB; 35 (Germany) Richard Yancy S; Rookies in italics

== Schedule ==
Week	Date	Kickoff (Note: All times local to where the game was played.)	Opponent	Results		Game site	Attendance
Week	Date	Kickoff	Opponent	Final score	Team record	Game site	Attendance
1	Saturday, April 21	6:00 p.m.	Barcelona Dragons	L 14–21	0–1	Jahn-Sportpark	8,213
2	Saturday, April 28	7:00 p.m.	at Frankfurt Galaxy	W 28–20	1–1	Waldstadion	27,928
3	Sunday, May 6	3:00 p.m.	at Scottish Claymores	L 21–28	1–2	Hampden Park	10,419
4	Saturday, May 12	6:00 p.m.	Rhein Fire	W 23–17	2–2	Jahn-Sportpark	9,148
5	Saturday, May 19	6:00 p.m.	Frankfurt Galaxy	W 34–25	3–2	Jahn-Sportpark	9,559
6	Saturday, May 26	5:00 p.m.	at Barcelona Dragons	L 35–55	3–3	Estadi Olímpic de Montjuïc	9,661
7	Saturday, June 2	6:00 p.m.	Scottish Claymores	W 27–19	4–3	Jahn-Sportpark	8,917
8	Sunday, June 10	7:00 p.m.	at Rhein Fire	L 13–16 ^{OT}	4–4	Rheinstadion	30,701
9	Saturday, June 16	6:00 p.m.	Amsterdam Admirals	W 41–10	5–4	Jahn-Sportpark	10,478
10	Sunday, June 24	6:00 p.m.	at Amsterdam Admirals	W 34–28	6–4	Amsterdam ArenA	13,812
World Bowl IX
11	Saturday, June 30	6:00 p.m.	Barcelona Dragons	W 24–17	7–4	Amsterdam ArenA	32,116

== Standings ==
NFL Europe League
Team	W	L	T	PCT	PF	PA	Home	Road	STK
Barcelona Dragons	8	2	0	.800	252	191	5–0	3–2	L1
Berlin Thunder	6	4	0	.600	270	239	4–1	2–3	W2
Rhein Fire	5	5	0	.500	174	179	4–1	1–4	L1
Scottish Claymores	4	6	0	.400	168	188	4–1	0–5	W1
Amsterdam Admirals	4	6	0	.400	194	226	4–1	0–5	L3
Frankfurt Galaxy	3	7	0	.300	199	234	3–2	0–5	W1

== Game summaries ==
=== Week 1: vs Barcelona Dragons ===
Week One: Barcelona Dragons at Berlin Thunder – Game summary

Quarter	1	2	3	4	Total
Barcelona	7	7	7	0	21
Berlin	0	7	0	7	14

at Friedrich-Ludwig-Jahn-Sportpark, Berlin, Germany

- Date: Saturday, April 21
- Game time: 6:05 p.m. CEST
- Game attendance: 8,213
- Referee: Walt Anderson

=== World Bowl IX ===
World Bowl IX: Berlin Thunder vs Barcelona Dragons – Game summary

Quarter	1	2	3	4	Total
Berlin	4	6	0	14	24
Barcelona	3	6	8	0	17

at Amsterdam ArenA, Amsterdam, Netherlands

- Date: Saturday, June 30
- Game time: 6:00 p.m. CEST
- Game weather: 70 °F (21 °C)
- Game attendance: 32,116
- Referee: Terry McAulay
- TV announcers (FOX): Curt Menefee and Brian Baldinger
