= Richard Seals =

American football player (born 1976)

No. 94, 76
- Positions: Offensive line, defensive line

Personal information
- Born: March 18, 1976 (age 50); Houston, Texas, U.S.
- Listed height: 6 ft 3 in (1.91 m)
- Listed weight: 305 lb (138 kg)

Career information
- High school: Madison (Houston)
- College: Utah (1995–1999)
- NFL draft: 2000: 7th round, 218th overall pick

Career history
- New York Jets (2000)*; Frankfurt Galaxy (2001); Buffalo Bills (2002–2004); Los Angeles Avengers (2005–2006)
- * Offseason or practice squad member only

Career AFL statistics
- Total tackles: 8
- Pass break-ups: 2
- Stats at ArenaFan.com

Richard Anthony Seals (born March 18, 1976) is an American former professional football defensive tackle. He played college football at Utah. He was selected by the New York Jets in the seventh round of the 2000 NFL draft.

In his career, he also played for the Frankfurt Galaxy of NFL Europe, the Buffalo Bills of the NFL, and the Los Angeles Avengers of the Arena Football League (AFL).

== Early life ==
Seals attended James Madison High School in Houston, Texas. Seals joined the high school football team in tenth grade as a tight end. He recorded 21 receptions for 520 yards, as a senior. Besides Utah, he was also recruited by Minnesota, Syracuse and Texas A&M.

As a freshman, in 1996, Seals started the season as a back-up tight end. On September 18, he was switched to defensive tackle and 10 days later started against Kansas.

== Professional career ==
Pre-draft measurables
Height	Weight	40-yard dash	10-yard split	20-yard split	20-yard shuttle	Three-cone drill	Vertical jump	Broad jump	Bench press
6 ft 2 in (1.88 m)	316 lb (143 kg)	5.03 s	1.74 s	2.96 s	4.60 s	7.78 s	28 1/2 in (0.72 m)	8 ft 6 in (2.59 m)	24 reps
All values from the 2000 NFL Combine.

Seals was selected in the seventh round (218th overall) of the 2000 NFL draft by the New York Jets. On May 18, 2000, he signed his rookie contract. After being released by the Jets, he changed teams multiple times, spending time with the Frankfurt Galaxy for the 2001 season. Then spending the 2002, 2003, and part of the 2004 seasons with the Buffalo Bills. On November 1, 2005, he was signed by the Los Angeles Avengers of the Arena Football League, where he appeared in eight games over the 2005 and 2006 seasons.

== Personal life ==
In 2016, Seals filed a lawsuit against the NCAA and the Western Athletic Conference claiming the failed to protect athletes from concussions. In the suit, he claimed he had numerous concussions at practice and in. As a result, he suffers from deficient cognitive and reasoning skills, memory loss, sleeplessness and mood swings.
