= La Salle High School (Milwaukie, Oregon) =

La Salle Catholic College Preparatory
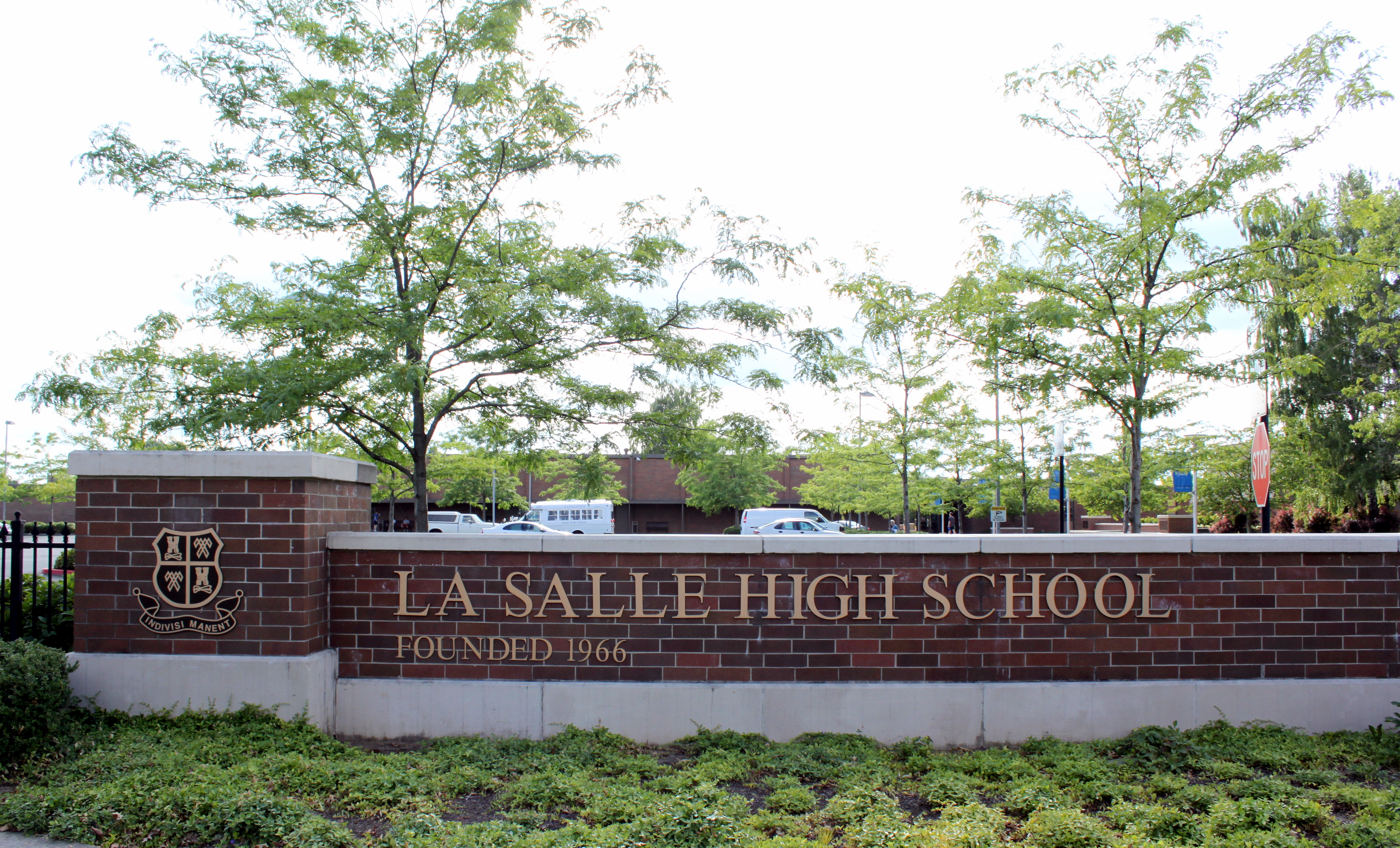

Location
- 11999 SE Fuller Rd. Milwaukie, Clackamas County, Oregon 97222; United States; 45°26′11″N 122°35′12″W

Information
- Type: Private
- Motto: Enter to learn, Leave to serve.
- Religious affiliations: Roman Catholic, (Christian Brothers)
- Established: 1966; 60 years ago
- Founder: Institute of the Brothers of the Christian Schools
- School district: m
- Oversight: Archdiocese of Portland
- President: John Huelskamp
- Faculty: 86
- Grades: 9–12
- Gender: Coeducational
- Enrollment: 670 (2026)
- Student to teacher ratio: 13 to 1
- Colors: Scarlet and Royal Blue
- Athletics conference: OSAA Northwest Oregon Conference 5A
- Mascot: Falcon
- Team name: Falcons
- Rival: Milwaukie High School, Rex Putnam High School, Wilsonville High School
- Accreditation: Northwest Accreditation Commission
- Publication: The Falconer (online student newspaper)
- Annual tuition: $19,900
- Website: La Salle Catholic College Preparatory

La Salle Catholic College Preparatory is a private co-ed Roman Catholic College Preparatory School in Milwaukie, Oregon, near Portland. Under the Archdiocese of Portland, the Brothers of the Christian Schools established La Salle in 1966 as part of their worldwide network of schools. The school has been accredited by the Northwest Accreditation Commission since 1979.

== Curriculum ==
La Salle Preparatory offers 14 Advanced Placement (AP) courses in addition to fifteen honors courses, including some honors courses in which students are eligible to receive college credit for courses from various Portland area colleges and transfer the credit to their college upon graduation from the school. Students are also required to take 4 years of Catholic religious studies to graduate.

== Extracurricular activities ==
La Salle offers a variety of clubs and programs in addition to its athletic programs. These include journalism, charity and affinity groups. The school offers its students a chance to participate in competitive educational immersion programs, such as Harvard Model Congress, Lasallian Student Leaders, and Lasallian Youth Assembly, as well as language immersion programs to Germany, France, Spain, and Costa Rica. The school also offers a student counseling and planning program, employing three personal counselors, a student advancement director, and two college counselors. Students are required to complete 80 hours of service to graduate.

== Campus ==
LaSalle owns 34 acres, consisting of 2 baseball diamonds, 2 softball diamonds, tennis courts, a turf football and soccer field with bleachers, and a track. In 2010, the school installed a 98-kilowatt solar system using funding from a subsidiary of MDU Resources. The system provides 10-20% of the school's power.

== Athletics ==
=== State championships ===
- Chess: 2012, 2014, 2015, 2016
- Boys Basketball: 1981, 1983, 1984, 1986, 2025
- Boys cross country: 2013
- Boys doubles racquetball (National Championships): 2006
- Boys soccer: 1994, 1998, 1999, 2004, 2009, 2019, 2021, 2024, 2025
- Boys golf: 1988, 1989, 1991, 2013
- Boys track and field: 1997
- Boys tennis: 1979, 2011, 2024
- Cheerleading: 1987, 1988, 1998
- Football: 2011
- Girls basketball: 1981, 1984, 2015, 2017, 2019
- Girls cross country: 2012
- Girls soccer: 2016
- Girls swimming: 1998, 1999
- Girls tennis: 1981, 2025
- Speech & Debate: 2025
- Volleyball: 1981, 1983, 1994, 1995, 1997

== Notable alumni ==
- Shane Waldron 1997, Seattle Seahawks Offensive Coordinator
- Michael Cassidy, 2001, actor
- Ryan Cochrane, 2001, Major League Soccer player
- Matthew Dickman, 1993, poet
- James Whalen, 1996, professional football player
- Aleah Goodman, 2017, WNBA player
