= Andrew Bayes =

American football player (born 1978)

Profile
- Position: Punter

Personal information
- Born: February 11, 1978 (age 48); Washington, D.C., U.S.
- Listed height: 6 ft 2 in (1.88 m)
- Listed weight: 200 lb (91 kg)

Career information
- High school: DeMatha Catholic (Hyattsville, Maryland)
- College: East Carolina
- NFL draft: 2000: undrafted

Career history
- Detroit Lions (2000)*; Tampa Bay Buccaneers (2001); → Frankfurt Galaxy (2001); San Francisco 49ers (2002)*; → Amsterdam Admirals (2002)
- * Offseason or practice squad member only

Awards and highlights
- Consensus All-American (1999); First-team All-C-USA (1999)

Andrew Bayes (born February 11, 1978) is an American former football punter. He played college football for the East Carolina Pirates, earning consensus All-American honors in 1999.

== Early life ==
Bayes first attended Suitland High School in Forestville, Maryland before transferring to DeMatha Catholic High School in Hyattsville, Maryland.

== College career ==
Bayes played for the East Carolina Pirates from 1996 to 1999. He was a consensus All-American in 1999. He led Division I-A football in punting average in 1999 with 48.06 yards per punt, which remains a Conference USA and East Carolina single-season record. Bayes was also named first-team Conference USA in 1999 and second-team Conference USA in 1998 and 1997. He played in the Senior Bowl in 1999. He was inducted into the ECU Athletics Hall of Fame in 2017.

== Professional career ==
Bayes was rated the second-best punter in the 2000 NFL draft by NFLDraftScout.com. After going undrafted, Bayes signed with the Detroit Lions in April 2000. He was released on August 4, 2000.

Bayes signed with the Tampa Bay Buccaneers on April 23, 2001 and was allocated to NFL Europe, where he played for the Frankfurt Galaxy during the 2001 season. He was released by the Buccaneers on September 3, 2001 but was later re-signed on December 29, 2001.

Bayes was signed by the San Francisco 49ers on January 17, 2002. He was allocated to NFL Europe, where he played for the Amsterdam Admirals during the 2002 season. He was released by the 49ers on August 14, 2002.
