= Keith Miller (American football) =

American football player (born 1976)

No. 53
- Position: Linebacker

Personal information
- Born: July 9, 1976 (age 50); San Diego, California, U.S.
- Listed height: 6 ft 1 in (1.85 m)
- Listed weight: 238 lb (108 kg)

Career information
- High school: Mt. Carmel (San Diego)
- College: California
- NFL draft: 2000: undrafted

Career history
- St. Louis Rams (2000); → Scottish Claymores (2001); Tennessee Titans (2001)*; Seattle Seahawks (2002)
- * Offseason or practice squad member only
- Stats at Pro Football Reference

Keith McLaughlin Miller (born July 9, 1976) is an American former professional football linebacker who played in the National Football League (NFL) with the St. Louis Rams and Seattle Seahawks. He played college football for the California Golden Bears.

== Early life ==
Keith McLaughlin Miller was born on July 9, 1976, in San Diego, California. He attended Mt. Carmel High School in San Diego.

== College career ==
Miller played junior college football at Palomar College from 1995 to 1996. He transferred to the University of California, Berkeley, where he was a member of the Golden Bears from 1997 to 1999. He was a two-year letterman from 1998 to 1999.

== Professional career ==
After going undrafted in the 2000 NFL draft, Miller signed with the St. Louis Rams on April 20, 2000. He played in all 16 games for the Rams during the 2000 season, mostly on special teams. He recorded nine solo tackles, five assisted tackles, and one fumble recovery. In February 2001, the Rams allocated him to NFL Europe to play for the Scottish Claymores. Miller led the Claymores in tackles during the 2001 NFL Europe season, posting 45 defensive tackles, six special teams tackles, two sacks, five forced fumbles, and one pass breakup.

Miller signed with the Tennessee Titans on July 18, 2001. He was waived on August 31, 2001.

On January 10, 2002, Miller signed a reserve/future contract with the Seattle Seahawks. He was waived on August 26 but re-signed on November 13, 2002. He played in seven games for the Seahawks during the 2002 season, totaling six solo tackles and two assisted tackles. Miller was waived on June 26, 2003.
