= Gaylon Hyder =

American football player (born 1974)

No. 94
- Position: Defensive tackle

Personal information
- Born: October 18, 1974 (age 52); Longview, Texas, U.S.
- Listed height: 6 ft 5 in (1.96 m)
- Listed weight: 290 lb (132 kg)

Career information
- High school: Longview
- College: TCU
- NFL draft: 1996: undrafted

Career history
- St. Louis Rams (1999–2000); Rhein Fire (2001); Chicago Bears (2001)*; Cleveland Browns (2001); Oakland Raiders (2003)*
- * Offseason or practice squad member only

Awards and highlights
- Super Bowl champion (XXXIV)
- Stats at Pro Football Reference

Gaylon Hyder (born October 18, 1974) is an American former professional football player who was a defensive tackle for the St. Louis Rams of the National Football League (NFL) from 1999 to 2000. He played college football for the TCU Horned Frogs.
