= Dwaune Jones =

American football scout (born 1977)

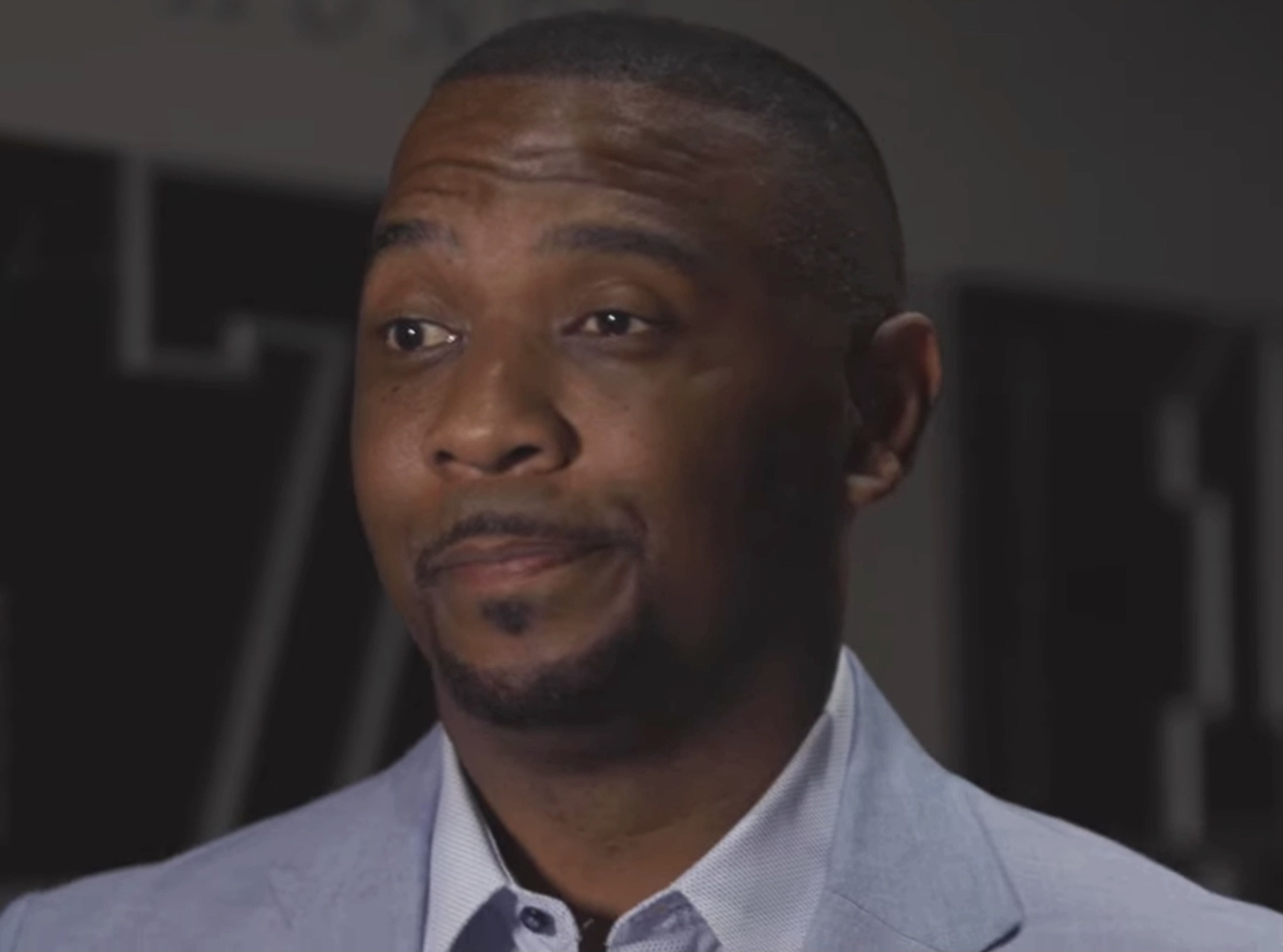
- Jones in 2022

Washington Commanders
- Title: National scout

Personal information
- Born: July 11, 1977 (age 49); Washington, D.C., U.S.
- Listed height: 6 ft 1 in (1.85 m)
- Listed weight: 194 lb (88 kg)

Career information
- Position: Wide receiver
- High school: Potomac School (McLean, Virginia)
- College: Richmond (1995–1999)
- NFL draft: 2000: undrafted

Career history

Playing
- Cleveland Browns (2000)*; Seattle Seahawks (2000)*; Berlin Thunder (2001); Seattle Seahawks (2001)*; Houston Texans (2002)
- * Offseason or practice squad member only

Coaching
- Cologne Centurions (2004) Wide receivers coach

Operations
- New Orleans Saints (2005–2016) Scout; Baltimore Ravens (2017–2020) Scout; Atlanta Falcons (2021–2023) Assistant director of college scouting; Washington Commanders (2024–present) National scout

Awards and highlights
- World Bowl champion (IX)

Dwaune Jones (born July 11, 1977) is an American professional football scout for the Washington Commanders of the National Football League (NFL). He played college football as a wide receiver for the Richmond Spiders.

Pre-draft measurables
Height	Weight	40-yard dash	10-yard split	20-yard split
6 ft 0 1/8 in (1.83 m)	191 lb (87 kg)	4.66 s	1.65 s	2.71 s
All values from NFL Combine

Jones spent time with the NFL's Cleveland Browns, Seattle Seahawks, and Houston Texans and played for the Berlin Thunder of NFL Europe, catching two touchdowns for the latter in World Bowl IX. He coached with the Cologne Centurions before becoming a scout with the New Orleans Saints in 2005, later scouting for the Baltimore Ravens and serving as the assistant director of college scouting for the Atlanta Falcons. Jones joined the Commanders as a national scout in 2024.
