= Jonathan Quinn =

American football player and coach (born 1975)

Davidson Academy Bears
- Title: Head coach

Personal information
- Born: February 27, 1975 (age 51); Turlock, California, U.S.
- Listed height: 6 ft 6 in (1.98 m)
- Listed weight: 243 lb (110 kg)

Career information
- High school: McGavock (Nashville, Tennessee)
- College: Middle Tennessee State
- NFL draft: 1998: 3rd round, 86th overall pick

Career history

Playing
- Jacksonville Jaguars (1998–2001); Berlin Thunder (2001); Kansas City Chiefs (2002–2003); Chicago Bears (2004); Kansas City Chiefs (2005)*; Kansas City Brigade (2006)*
- * Offseason or practice squad member only

Coaching
- MidAmerica Nazarene (2007–2008) Offensive coordinator; MidAmerica Nazarene (2009–2013) Head coach; Davidson Academy (TN) (2014–present) Head coach

Awards and highlights
- World Bowl IX MVP (2001)

Career NFL statistics
- Passing attempts: 223
- Passing completions: 117
- Completion percentage: 52.5%
- TD–INT: 4–7
- Passing yards: 1,161
- Passer rating: 60.4
- Stats at Pro Football Reference

Jonathan Ryan Quinn (born February 27, 1975) is an American football coach and former player. He played professionally as a quarterback in the National Football League (NFL) with the Jacksonville Jaguars, Kansas City Chiefs and Chicago Bears. He was selected with the 25th pick of the third round of the 1998 NFL draft out of Middle Tennessee State University by the Jaguars. Quinn served as the head football coach at MidAmerica Nazarene University in Olathe, Kansas from 2009 to 2013.

== College career ==
Quinn transferred to Middle Tennessee State after one year at Tulane University. He followed QB Kelly Holcomb after transferring. His senior year numbers surpassed the numbers that Holcomb had put up his senior season.

- 1995: 108/223 for 1,742 yards with 8 TD vs 7 INT.
- 1996: 71/159 for 931 yards with 4 TD vs 9 INT.
- 1997: 167/293 for 2,209 yards with 16 TD vs 10 INT.

== Professional career ==
After being drafted in 1998 by the Jacksonville Jaguars, he appeared in four games in 1998, two of them as the starting quarterback. The following year, had no appearances, and in 2000, Quinn made one appearance with no starts. Quinn was the starting quarterback for the 2001 World Bowl IX champion Berlin Thunder of NFL Europe, where he was the league leading passer throwing for 2,257 yards, and was named World Bowl MVP. In the 2001 NFL season he appeared in six games for the Jaguars, including starting one; a Week 10 loss to the Steelers.

In 2002–2003, Quinn was a member of the Kansas City Chiefs, made one appearance, but recorded no player stats. He spent a season with the Chicago Bears in 2004, playing in five games, with three starts, before ending his NFL career.

Quinn was signed by the Kansas City Brigade of the Arena Football League (AFL) during the 2006–2007 offseason, but retired due to injury.

== Coaching career ==
From 2007 to 2008, Quinn was the offensive coordinator for MidAmerica Nazarene University (MNU) in Olathe, Kansas. On April 3, 2009, he was named as the head football coach for MidAmerica Nazarene.

In 2014, Quinn took a job as the head football coach at Davidson Academy, a K-12 school in Nashville, Tennessee.

== Head coaching record ==
=== College ===
| Year | Team | Overall | Conference | Standing | Bowl/playoffs | NAIA^{#} |
|---|---|---|---|---|---|---|
MidAmerica Nazarene Pioneers (Heart of America Athletic Conference) (2009–2013)
| 2009 | MidAmerica Nazarene | 10–2 | 9–1 | 2nd | L NAIA Quarterfinal | 8 |
| 2010 | MidAmerica Nazarene | 12–1 | 10–0 | 1st | L NAIA Semifinal | 4 |
| 2011 | MidAmerica Nazarene | 10–2 | 8–1 | T–1st | L NAIA Quarterfinal | 6 |
| 2012 | MidAmerica Nazarene | 8–3 | 8–1 | 2nd | L NAIA First Round | 12 |
| 2013 | MidAmerica Nazarene | 5–5 | 5–4 | T–4th | | |
| MidAmerica Nazarene: | | 45–13 | 40–7 | | | |
| Total: | | 45–13 | | | | |
National championship Conference title Conference division title or championship game berth

=== High school ===
| Year | Team | Overall | Conference | Standing | Bowl/playoffs |
|---|---|---|---|---|---|
Davidson Academy Bears () (2014–present)
| 2014 | Davidson Academy | 5–8 | 2–3 | 13th | |
| 2015 | Davidson Academy | 8–4 | 2–1 | 8th | |
| 2016 | Davidson Academy | 7–4 | 3–1 | 6th | |
| 2017 | Davidson Academy | 11–1 | 7–0 | 1st | |
| 2018 | Davidson Academy | 13–0 | 6–0 | 1st | |
| 2019 | Davidson Academy | 11–2 | 7–1 | 2nd | |
| 2020 | Davidson Academy | 13–0 | 8–0 | 1st | |
| 2021 | Davidson Academy | 8–5 | 2–2 | 4th | |
| 2022 | Davidson Academy | 6–6 | 2–3 | 4th | |
| 2023 | Davidson Academy | 10–3 | 4–2 | 3rd | |
| 2024 | Davidson Academy | 1–1 | 0–0 | | |
| Davidson Academy: | | 95–34 | 43–13 | | |
| Total: | | 95–34 | | | |
National championship Conference title Conference division title or championship game berth
