= Spencer George =

American football player (born 1973)

No. 35, 26, 22
- Position: Running back

Personal information
- Born: October 28, 1973 (age 53); Beaumont, Texas, U.S.
- Listed height: 5 ft 9 in (1.75 m)
- Listed weight: 202 lb (92 kg)

Career information
- High school: Hamshire-Fannett (Hamshire, Texas)
- College: Rice
- NFL draft: 1997: undrafted

Career history
- Tennessee Oilers/Titans (1997–1999); Amsterdam Admirals (2001)

Career NFL statistics
- Return yards: 81
- Stats at Pro Football Reference

Spencer James George (born October 28, 1973) is an American former professional football player who was a running back for the Tennessee Oilers/Titans of the National Football League (NFL). He played college football for the Rice Owls.
