= Shane Waldron =

American football coach (born 1979)

Jacksonville Jaguars
- Title: Assistant head coach/Passing game coordinator

Personal information
- Born: August 17, 1979 (age 47); Portland, Oregon, U.S.

Career information
- Positions: Tight end, long snapper
- High school: La Salle (Milwaukie, Oregon)
- College: Tufts (1999–2002)

Career history

Coaching
- Notre Dame (2005–2007) Graduate assistant; New England Patriots (2008–2009); Offensive quality control coach (2008); Tight ends coach (2009); Hartford Colonials (2010) Wide receivers coach; Buckingham Browne & Nichols School (2011) Offensive coordinator; UMass (2012–2015); Tight ends coach (2012–2013); Offensive line coach (2014–2015); Washington Redskins (2016) Offensive quality control coach; Los Angeles Rams (2017–2020); Tight ends coach (2017); Passing game coordinator (2018); Passing game coordinator & quarterbacks coach (2019); Pass game coordinator (2020); Seattle Seahawks (2021–2023) Offensive coordinator; Chicago Bears (2024) Offensive coordinator; Jacksonville Jaguars (2025–present); Passing game coordinator (2025); Assistant head coach/passing game coordinator (2026–present)

Operations
- New England Patriots (2002–2004); Operations intern (2002–2003); Operations assistant (2004)

Awards and highlights
- 2× Super Bowl champion (XXXVIII, XXXIX)
- Coaching profile at Pro Football Reference

Shane Waldron (born August 17, 1979) is an American professional football coach who currently serves as the assistant head coach and passing game coordinator for the Jacksonville Jaguars of the National Football League (NFL). He previously served as an assistant coach for the Los Angeles Rams, Washington Redskins, New England Patriots and as offensive coordinator for the Seattle Seahawks and Chicago Bears.

== Early life ==
Waldron grew up in Carver, Oregon, outside of Portland. Waldron attended La Salle High School in Milwaukie, Oregon. After a year at Phillips Academy in Andover, Massachusetts, he played college football at Tufts University as a tight end and long snapper from 1999 through 2002.

== Coaching career ==
=== New England Patriots ===
Starting in 2002, Waldron served as an operations intern for the New England Patriots for two seasons before being promoted to operations assistant in 2004, where he handled special teams quality control duties and oversaw the completion of the weekly game plans.

=== Notre Dame Fighting Irish ===
From 2005 to 2007, Waldron followed Patriots offensive coordinator Charlie Weis to the University of Notre Dame to serve as a graduate assistant.

=== New England Patriots ===
Waldron was rehired by the New England Patriots and worked under head coach Bill Belichick, also a Phillips Academy alumnus, as offensive quality control coach in 2008. He was promoted to tight ends coach for the 2009 season.

=== Hartford Colonials ===
He left the Patriots after the 2009 season and joined the Hartford Colonials of the United Football League as their wide receivers coach in 2010.

=== UMass Minutemen ===
After spending 2011 at the Buckingham Browne & Nichols School, Waldron moved to the University of Massachusetts and was the recruiting coordinator and tight ends coach from 2012 to 2013 before being promoted to offensive line coach from 2014 to 2015.

=== Washington Redskins ===
In 2016, Waldron was hired by the Washington Redskins as an offensive quality control coach.

=== Los Angeles Rams ===
On February 2, 2017, Waldron was hired to be the tight ends coach for the Los Angeles Rams, under new head coach Sean McVay.

On January 30, 2018, Waldron was named passing game coordinator, after Matt LaFleur became offensive coordinator for the Tennessee Titans. Head coach Sean McVay promoted offensive line coach Aaron Kromer to run game coordinator and Waldron to passing game coordinator in order to help fill the void. In 2019, Waldron was promoted to quarterbacks coach after Zac Taylor was named head coach of the Cincinnati Bengals.

=== Seattle Seahawks ===
On January 26, 2021, Waldron was hired by the Seattle Seahawks as their offensive coordinator under head coach Pete Carroll, replacing Brian Schottenheimer.

=== Chicago Bears ===
On January 23, 2024, Waldron was officially hired by the Chicago Bears as their offensive coordinator under head coach Matt Eberflus, replacing Luke Getsy. The Bears fired Waldron nine games into his tenure on November 12 after the team reached a 4–5 record midway through the season. The Bears ranked 30th in the league in total offense and 24th in scoring at the time of his dismissal.

=== Jacksonville Jaguars ===
On February 6, 2025, the Jacksonville Jaguars hired Waldron to serve as their pass-game coordinator. On June 30, 2026, Waldron added "assistant head coach" to his title.
