= Jamal Brooks =

American football player (born 1976)

No. 50, 55
- Position: Linebacker

Personal information
- Born: November 9, 1976 (age 49); Lansing, Michigan, U.S.
- Listed height: 6 ft 2 in (1.88 m)
- Listed weight: 238 lb (108 kg)

Career information
- High school: Grenada Hills (CA)
- College: Hampton
- NFL draft: 2000: undrafted

Career history
- New Orleans Saints (2000)*; Scottish Claymores (2001); Dallas Cowboys (2001–2003); Cleveland Browns (2005)*; → Berlin Thunder (2005); St. Louis Rams (2006)
- * Offseason or practice squad member only

Career NFL statistics
- Games played: 23
- Tackles: 28
- Forced fumbles: 1
- Stats at Pro Football Reference

Jamal Benjamin Brooks (born November 9, 1976) is an American former professional football player who was a linebacker in the National Football League (NFL) for the Dallas Cowboys and St. Louis Rams. He played college football for the Hampton Pirates.

== Early life ==
Brooks attended Granada Hills Charter High School, before moving on to Pasadena City College in 1994. He transferred to Hampton University during his freshman season.

In his first year at Hampton, he collected 35 tackles and one sack. As a sophomore, he tallied 46 tackles and one forced fumble. As a junior, he had 26 tackles (4 for loss) and 2 fumble recoveries.

As a senior middle linebacker, he posted 75 tackles (3 solo), 12 tackles for loss, 2.5 sacks and one interception. He finished his college career with 184 tackles (86 solo) and was named team captain in his last two years.

== Professional career ==
=== New Orleans Saints ===
Brooks was signed as an undrafted free agent by the New Orleans Saints after the 2000 NFL draft on April 18. He was waived on August 22.

=== Scottish Claymores ===
Brooks was selected by the Scottish Claymores in the third round (14th overall) of the 2001 NFL Europe League Free agent Draft. He was named the starter at outside linebacker, posting 42 tackles (second on the team), 1.5 sacks and 3 passes defensed.

=== Dallas Cowboys ===
On July 10, 2001, Brooks was signed by the Dallas Cowboys after playing in NFL Europe. As a rookie, he played all three linebacker positions, registered 20 special teams tackles (second on the team) and got a chance to start in the ninth game of the season in place of an injured Dexter Coakley.

On August 29, 2002, he suffered a fractured left fibula in the preseason finale against the Jacksonville Jaguars and was placed on the injured reserve list on September 1.

He was released on August 31, 2003, and was later re-signed on November 21, to provide depth after Al Singleton was injured. He was declared inactive in the final 6 games. He was released on August 23, 2004.

=== Cleveland Browns ===
On February 15, 2005, he was signed as a free agent by the Cleveland Browns. He was allocated to the Berlin Thunder of the NFL Europe League and helped the team reach World Bowl XIII. He was cut by the Browns on September 3.

=== St. Louis Rams ===
On February 21, 2006, he was signed by the St. Louis Rams as a free agent. At the start of the regular season, he was limited with toe and leg injuries. He was released on October 12 and re-signed on November 28. He was declared inactive for most of the games. He was released on August 31, 2007.
