= James Hill (American football) =

American football player (born 1974)

No. 85
- Position: Tight end

Personal information
- Born: October 25, 1974 (age 52); Southampton, New York, U.S.
- Listed height: 6 ft 4 in (1.93 m)
- Listed weight: 246 lb (112 kg)

Career information
- High school: Riverhead (NY)
- College: Abilene Christian
- NFL draft: 1999: undrafted

Career history
- Seattle Seahawks (1999)*; Seattle Seahawks (2000); Amsterdam Admirals (2001)
- * Offseason or practice squad member only

Career NFL statistics
- Games played: 10
- Games started: 0
- Stats at Pro Football Reference

James Hill (born October 25, 1974) is an American former professional football player who was a tight end in the National Football League (NFL). He played ten games in the 2000 NFL season with the Seattle Seahawks and six games with the Amsterdam Admirals, before suffering a broken leg. Hill played college football for the Abilene Christian Wildcats. He played high school football for Riverhead High School in Riverhead, New York.
