= DeAuntae Brown =

American football player (born 1974)

No. 35, 25, 2
- Position: Cornerback

Personal information
- Born: April 28, 1974 (age 52); Detroit, Michigan, U.S.
- Listed height: 5 ft 11 in (1.80 m)
- Listed weight: 195 lb (88 kg)

Career information
- High school: Osborn (Detroit)
- College: Central State
- NFL draft: 1997: 7th round, 227th overall pick

Career history
- Philadelphia Eagles (1997); Pittsburgh Steelers (1997-1998)*; Seattle Seahawks (1999)*; Denver Broncos (2000–2001)*; → Barcelona Dragons (2000-2001); Toronto Phantoms (2002); Grand Rapids Rampage (2003); Philadelphia Soul (2004)
- * Offseason or practice squad member only

Career AFL statistics
- Tackles: 95
- Interceptions: 4
- Passes defended: 20
- Stats at ArenaFan.com
- Stats at Pro Football Reference

DeAuntae Brown (born April 28, 1974) is an American former professional football player who was a cornerback for one season in the National Football League (NFL) for the Philadelphia Eagles, two seasons in NFL Europe for the Barcelona Dragons, and three seasons in the Arena Football League (AFL) for the Toronto Phantoms, Grand Rapids Rampage, and Philadelphia Soul. After playing college football for the Central State Marauders, he was selected by the Eagles in the seventh round of the 1997 NFL draft.

== Professional career ==
Brown was drafted by the Philadelphia Eagles in the seventh round (227th overall) of the 1997 NFL draft on April 20, 1997. He signed a contract with the Eagles on June 4, 1997. He was waived on September 2, 1997, after playing in one game with the team. He was signed to the Pittsburgh Steelers' practice squad on October 22 where he remained for the rest of the season.

Brown participated in training camp for the Steelers in 1998, but was waived on August 18 after being limited due to a quadriceps injury. He spent the 1998 season on the Steelers' practice squad. He was signed by the Seattle Seahawks in 1999, but was again waived during final roster cuts on September 6, 1999.

Brown was signed by the Denver Broncos to a futures contract on January 10, 2000, and was waived during final roster cuts on August 27, 2000. He was re-signed to the team's practice squad on November 15, 2000, and stayed on the practice squad for the rest of the season. He was signed to a futures contract by the Broncos on January 2, 2001. He was allocated to the Barcelona Dragons of NFL Europe on February 28, 2001. Brown was waived by the Broncos on September 2, 2001.

Brown played in the AFL for three teams from 2002 to 2004: the Toronto Phantoms in 2002, the Grand Rapids Rampage in 2003, and the Philadelphia Soul in 2004. He announced his retirement on February 9, 2005.
