= World Bowl '98 =

1998 NFL Europe championship game

Rhein Fire	Frankfurt Galaxy
34	10
	1	2	3	4	Total
RHE	10	7	7	10	34
FRA	0	7	3	0	10
- Date: Sunday, June 14, 1998
- Stadium: Waldstadion; Frankfurt, Germany
- MVP: Jim Arellanes, Quarterback
- Referee: Tony Corrente
- Attendance: 47,846

TV in the United States
- Network: Fox
- Announcers: Tim Ryan, Bill Maas and Ronnie Lott

World Bowl '98 (also referred to as World Bowl VI) was the sixth championship game of the NFL Europe League. It was held at Waldstadion in Frankfurt, Germany on Sunday, June 14, 1998. The game was between the Frankfurt Galaxy, who finished the season in first place with a record of 7–3, and the second-placed Rhein Fire, which finished with a 7–3 record as well. 47,846 spectators were in attendance, the largest World Bowl crowd since 1991, when the Fire captured its first league title by defeating the Galaxy 34–10. Rhein's quarterback Jim Arellanes, filling in for injured Mike Quinn, earned MVP honors in his first start by completing 12 of 18 passing attempts for 263 yards and three touchdowns.

In the United States, it was broadcast by Fox.

== Background ==
The Fire won the first meeting 31–14 in Frankfurt, while the Galaxy took the second meeting 20–17 (overtime) in Düsseldorf.

== Game summary ==
In this World Bowl, two back-up quarterbacks were given the starting job for NFL Europe's biggest stage. For the Rhein Fire, it was Jim Arellanes and for the Frankfurt Galaxy it was Chris Dittoe. Even in the thrashing rain, the Fire managed to light first with a 29-yard field goal by German kicker Manfred Burgsmüller. Near the end of the first quarter, Arellanes led his Fire on a 10-play, 67-yard drive that was capped off with a 15-yard pass to wide receiver Dialleo Burks. In the second quarter, the Galaxy finally managed to score, thanks to a 13-play, 80-yard drive that concluded with a three-yard run by running back Jermaine Chaney. However, near the end of the first half, the Fire didn't want Frankfurt closing in on them, as Arellanes led a four-play, 40-yard drive that ended with a 20-yard touchdown pass to Burks, to make the score 17–7 at halftime. In the third quarter, the Galaxy struggled offensively to get points. In the end, all they could muster up was a 41-yard field goal by Ralf Kleinmann. For the remainder of the game, it was all Rhein. After Frankfurt's field goal, the Fire wrapped up the third period with a 74-yard touchdown pass from Arellanes to wide receiver Marcus Robinson. In the fourth quarter, the Fire managed to put the game away with Burgsmüller's 20-yard field goal and Jon Vaughn's 15-yard run. When the game clock reached zero, the Fire celebrated its first-ever World Bowl title.

Scoring summary

Quarter	Time	Drive			Team	Scoring information	Score	
Quarter	Time	Plays	Yards	TOP	Team	Scoring information	Rhein	Frankfurt
1	10:47	7	50		Rhein	29-yard field goal by Manfred Burgsmüller	3	0
1	2:31	10	52		Rhein	Dialleo Burks 15-yard touchdown reception from Jim Arellanes, Manfred Burgsmüller kick good	10	0
2	9:47	12	74		Frankfurt	Jermaine Chaney 3-yard touchdown run, Ralf Kleinmann kick good	10	7
2	3:36	4	40		Rhein	Dialleo Burks 20-yard touchdown reception from Jim Arellanes, Manfred Burgsmüller kick good	17	7
3	12:38	5	22		Frankfurt	41-yard field goal by Ralf Kleinmann	17	10
3	11:08	3	85		Rhein	Marcus Robinson 74-yard touchdown reception from Jim Arellanes, Manfred Burgsmüller kick good	24	10
4	3:39	5	44		Rhein	20-yard field goal by Manfred Burgsmüller	27	10
4	1:57	3	17		Rhein	Jon Vaughn 15-yard touchdown run, Manfred Burgsmüller kick good	34	10
"TOP" = time of possession. For other American football terms, see Glossary of American football.							34	10
