= Ahmad Merritt =

American football player (born 1977)

No. 81, 10, 83, 86
- Position: Wide receiver

Personal information
- Born: February 5, 1977 (age 49); Chicago, Illinois, U.S.
- Listed height: 5 ft 10 in (1.78 m)
- Listed weight: 197 lb (89 kg)

Career information
- High school: St. Rita (Chicago)
- College: Wisconsin
- NFL draft: 2000: undrafted

Career history
- Chicago Bears (2000–2004); Berlin Thunder (2001); Dallas Cowboys (2005–2006)*; Chicago Rush (2007); Arizona Cardinals (2007–2008)
- * Offseason or practice squad member only

Career NFL statistics
- Receptions: 19
- Receiving yards: 170
- Return yards: 1,505
- Stats at Pro Football Reference

Ahmad Rashad Merritt (born February 5, 1977) is an American former professional football player who was a wide receiver in the National Football League (NFL). He played college football for the Wisconsin Badgers and was signed by the Chicago Bears as an undrafted free agent in 2000.

Merritt was a member of the Dallas Cowboys, Chicago Rush and Arizona Cardinals.

== Early life ==
Merritt was born in Chicago and named after former NFL running back and wide receiver Ahmad Rashad, who was his father's favorite player at the time. Merritt attended St. Rita High School on Chicago's south side, where, as a senior, he earned All-America honors from Prep Football Report and SuperPrep. He had 63 receptions for 1,240 yards and 23 touchdowns throughout his high school career. Merritt was a grade school, high school, and college teammate of former NFL player Tony Simmons. Merritt and Simmons both played and caught touchdown passes in World Bowl IX. In 2012, Merritt was inducted into the St. Rita High School Hall of Fame.

== College career ==
Merritt started 21 games at wide receiver but primarily served as a return specialist through his four years at Wisconsin. He finished his collegiate career with 36 receptions for 528 yards and two touchdowns, 28 kick returns for 521 yards and 25 punt returns for 165 yards.

== Professional career ==
=== Chicago Bears ===
Merritt is probably most remembered for his 47-yard touchdown run on a reverse in the Bears 2001 divisional playoff loss to the Philadelphia Eagles (the last offensive touchdown scored for the Bears in Old Soldier Field). He was also the leading receiver of the 2001 World Bowl Champion Berlin Thunder of NFL Europa.

=== Dallas Cowboys ===
Merritt was in training camp with the Dallas Cowboys in 2005 and was on the verge of securing a roster spot when he tore ligaments in his foot and was given an injury settlement. He returned to the Cowboys in the offseason, but was later released a few days into training camp before the 2006 season.

=== Chicago Rush ===
Merritt started the first five games of the 2007 Arena Football season for the Chicago Rush, gaining 203 yards on 20 receptions with two touchdowns before being waived in early April.

=== Arizona Cardinals ===
Merritt was signed as a free agent by the Arizona Cardinals but spent his entire first season with the team on injured reserved after dislocating his ankle and breaking his fibula in a preseason game against the Houston Texans. He was re-signed by the team on March 26, 2008; however, he was released prior to the season on August 20.
