= Cory Bailey (American football) =

American football coach (born 1975)

Biographical details
- Born: December 9, 1975 (age 50)
- Education: Fordham (1998)

Playing career
- 1994–1997: Fordham
- 2001: Rhein Fire
- Position: Center

Coaching career (HC unless noted)
- 2001: Iona (TE/OT)
- 2002–2003: King Philip HS (MA) (DC)
- 2004–2007: Assumption
- 2009–2012: Assumption
- 2013–2017: Coastal Carolina (DL/RC)
- 2021: Stonehill (OL)
- 2022: Framingham State (OC/OL)
- 2023: Framingham State (AHC/OC)

Head coaching record
- Overall: 32–50

Cory Bailey (born December 9, 1975) is a college football coach. He was the assistant head coach and offensive coordinator for Framingham State University in 2023. He was also the defensive line coach and recruiting coordinator and at Coastal Carolina University in Conway, South Carolina. A graduate of the Fordham University, Bailey was the head football coach at Assumption College in Worcester, Massachusetts from 2004 to 2007 and again from 2009 to 2012, compiling a record of 32–50.

== Head coaching record ==
Year	Team	Overall	Conference	Standing	Bowl/playoffs
Assumption Greyhounds (Northeast-10 Conference) (2004–2007)
2004	Assumption	1–9	1–8		
2005	Assumption	4–6	3–6		
2006	Assumption	4–6	4–5		
2007	Assumption	4–7	4–5		
Assumption Greyhounds (Northeast-10 Conference) (2009–2012)
2009	Assumption	6–4	5–3		
2010	Assumption	6–5	3–5		
2011	Assumption	4–6	3–5		
2012	Assumption	3–7	3–5		
Assumption:		32–50	26–42		
Total:		32–50			
National championship Conference title Conference division title or championship game berth
