= John Waerig =

American football player (born 1976)

No. 46
- Position: Tight end

Personal information
- Born: April 8, 1976 (age 50); Philadelphia, Pennsylvania, U.S.
- Listed height: 6 ft 2 in (1.88 m)
- Listed weight: 254 lb (115 kg)

Career information
- High school: Cardinal Dougherty (Philadelphia)
- College: Maryland
- NFL draft: 2000: undrafted

Career history
- Jacksonville Jaguars (2000)*; Tampa Bay Buccaneers (2001)*; Detroit Lions (2001); → Barcelona Dragons (2001); → Amsterdam Admirals (2001); New York Giants (2002)*
- * Offseason or practice squad member only

Awards and highlights
- Second-team All-ACC (1999)

Career NFL statistics
- Receptions: 1
- Receiving yards: 6
- Stats at Pro Football Reference

John Waerig (born 1976) is an American former professional football player who was a tight end in the National Football League (NFL). He played college football for the Wisconsin Badgers and Maryland Terrapins. He was a member of the Detroit Lions during the 2001 NFL season. He also played for the Barcelona Dragons and Amsterdam Admirals of NFL Europe in 2001.
