= Lionel Hayes =

American football player (born 1977)

No. 2, 14
- Position: Quarterback

Personal information
- Born: June 21, 1977 (age 49)
- Listed height: 6 ft 2 in (1.88 m)
- Listed weight: 238 lb (108 kg)

Career information
- High school: Istrouma (Baton Rouge, Louisiana)
- College: Grambling State
- NFL draft: 2000: undrafted

Career history
- Las Vegas Outlaws (2001)*; Scottish Claymores (2001); Frankfurt Galaxy (2001); New Orleans VooDoo (2004)*; Macon Knights (2005)
- * Offseason or practice squad member only

Lionel Hayes (born June 21, 1977) is an American former football quarterback. He played college football for the Grambling State Tigers. He played professionally for the Frankfurt Galaxy of NFL Europe and the Macon Knights of the af2.

== Early life ==
Lionel Hayes was born on June 21, 1977. He attended Istrouma High School in Baton Rouge, Louisiana.

== College career ==
Hayes began his college football career at Southern University. In 1998, he transferred to play for the Grambling State Tigers of Grambling State University. He was the backup to Pete Burks through the first three games of the 1998 season but became the starter after Burks was benched. Hayes threw for 2,349 yards and 19 touchdowns overall in 1998. He was named the offensive MVP of the 1998 Bayou Classic after completing 21 of 45 passes for 357 yards and two touchdowns. As a senior in 1999, Hayes completed 188 of 366 passes for 2,935 yards, 30 touchdowns, and six interceptions. He finished his Grambling State career with a 12–10 win-loss record, 5,284 passing yards, 49 touchdowns, and 17 interceptions. His 50.7 career completion percentage also set the school's all-time record.

== Professional career ==
Hayes went undrafted in the 2000 NFL draft. On December 3, 2000, it was reported that Hayes had signed with the Las Vegas Outlaws of the upstart XFL. He played for the Outlaws during the 2001 preseason, and was released on January 18, 2001.

On February 20, 2001, Hayes was selected by the Scottish Claymores in the tenth round, with the 58th overall pick, of the 2001 NFL Europe draft. He began the 2001 NFL Europe season with the Claymores but did not record any statistics. On May 24, 2001, he was signed by the Frankfurt Galaxy. He completed 30 of 57 passes (52.6%) for 340 yards, four touchdowns, and three interceptions for the Galaxy during the 2001 season.

Hayes signed with the New Orleans VooDoo of the Arena Football League (AFL) on December 11, 2003. He was waived on January 31, 2004, before the start of the 2004 AFL season. He was signed to the VooDoo's practice squad on February 3, and later waived on February 20, 2004.

Hayes played for the Macon Knights of the af2 in 2005. He played in all 16 games for the Knights, completing over 60 percent of his passes for 3,958 yards and 70 touchdowns while also rushing 33 times for eight touchdowns. His 3,958 passing yards broke John Rayborn's franchise record. The Knights finished the 2005 season with an 8–8 record, and lost in the wild card round to the Louisville Fire. In November 2005, Hayes re-signed with the Knights for the 2006 season. However, a few weeks before training camp, Hayes announced that he would not be returning to the team, instead opting to stay at his full-time job in Baton Rouge.
