= Notre Dame Fighting Irish football under Bob Davie =

The Notre Dame Fighting Irish were led by Bob Davie and represented the University of Notre Dame in NCAA Division I college football from 1997 to 2001. The team was an independent and played their home games in Notre Dame Stadium. Throughout the five seasons, the Irish were 35–25 and invited to three bowl games, including the school's first ever Bowl Championship Series (BCS) bowl.

After the 1996 season, 11th-year head coach, Lou Holtz, who had led the Irish to 100 wins and a national championship, retired. The Notre Dame administration quickly named defensive coordinator, Bob Davie, as his replacement. Davie inherited a team with high expectations, and won his first game. He went onto, however, to lose his next four games. Though his team rebounded and were invited to a bowl game, he lost in his first post-season attempt and ended with a 7–6 record. His second year team returned many players and began the season ranked in the Associated Press (AP) poll. After an upset of highly ranked Michigan, the team stayed in the rankings throughout the season. With a loss in the final regular season game, though, the team lost their first chance of being invited to the BCS in its first year. The team once again lost in their bowl game and ended the season with a 9–3 record. Davie's third season started with a win, but three early losses dropped the team from the rankings. Although the team went on a four-game winning streak, they finished the season on a four-game losing streak to end with a 5–7 record and the first losing season for the Irish since 1986.

Davie's fourth season looked to be as bad as his third, as the team played four ranked teams early in the season and had to replace many graduating players. However, with two wins, and an overtime loss to the top-ranked team, Nebraska, the Irish moved into the rankings again. The team ended the season on a seven-game winning streak and were invited to their first BCS bowl game. Though they lost Davie's third bowl game, he signed a contract extension after the season. Davie's fifth season began with high expectations once again. The team began ranked, but three losses to begin the season dropped the Irish from the rankings. Though the team came back and won five games, the 5–6 record was called the wrong direction by the administration, and Davie was fired. After some controversy during the hiring process, Tyrone Willingham was hired, ending Davie's era at Notre Dame.

== Before Davie ==
For the 11 years before Davie, the Irish were coached by Lou Holtz. Holtz, who, it was reported, had returned the program to excellence, led the team to a national championship in 1988 and had been given, what was reported to be, a lifetime contract by Notre Dame. By his final season, 1996, Holtz had tallied 92 wins to put him third on the all-time Notre Dame wins list (only behind Ara Parseghian with 95 wins and Knute Rockne with 105 wins). Throughout the season there was speculation that Holtz, who passed Parseghian's mark, would retire rather than break Rockne's record, and on November 19, a week before his final home game at Notre Dame, it was revealed that he turned in his letter of resignation to the Notre Dame administration. In his final game at Notre Dame Stadium, where the team shut-out Rutgers 62–0, Holtz got his 100th and final win for the Irish. The Notre Dame administration didn't look far for Holtz's replacement, as their defensive coordinator, Bob Davie, who was hired by Holtz three years previous, was named as his replacement.

== After Davie ==
When Notre Dame athletic director Kevin White announced to the media that Davie would not be retained as head coach of Notre Dame, he cited a disappointing season with the Irish heading in the wrong direction on the field. A week after the firing of Davie, George O'Leary, seven–year head coach of Georgia Tech, was hired by Notre Dame for the head coaching position. Five days after being hired, however, O'Leary resigned from the position, because of discrepancies on his résumé about receiving a varsity letter and a master's degree while in school. While O'Leary was criticized for lying, some said it gave Notre Dame a chance to make a better decision. Finally, two weeks after O'Leary resigned, Notre Dame signed Tyrone Willingham, the seventh–year coach of Stanford, to a six-year contract, ending the Bob Davie era at Notre Dame.
