= Mike Quinn =

American football player (born 1974)

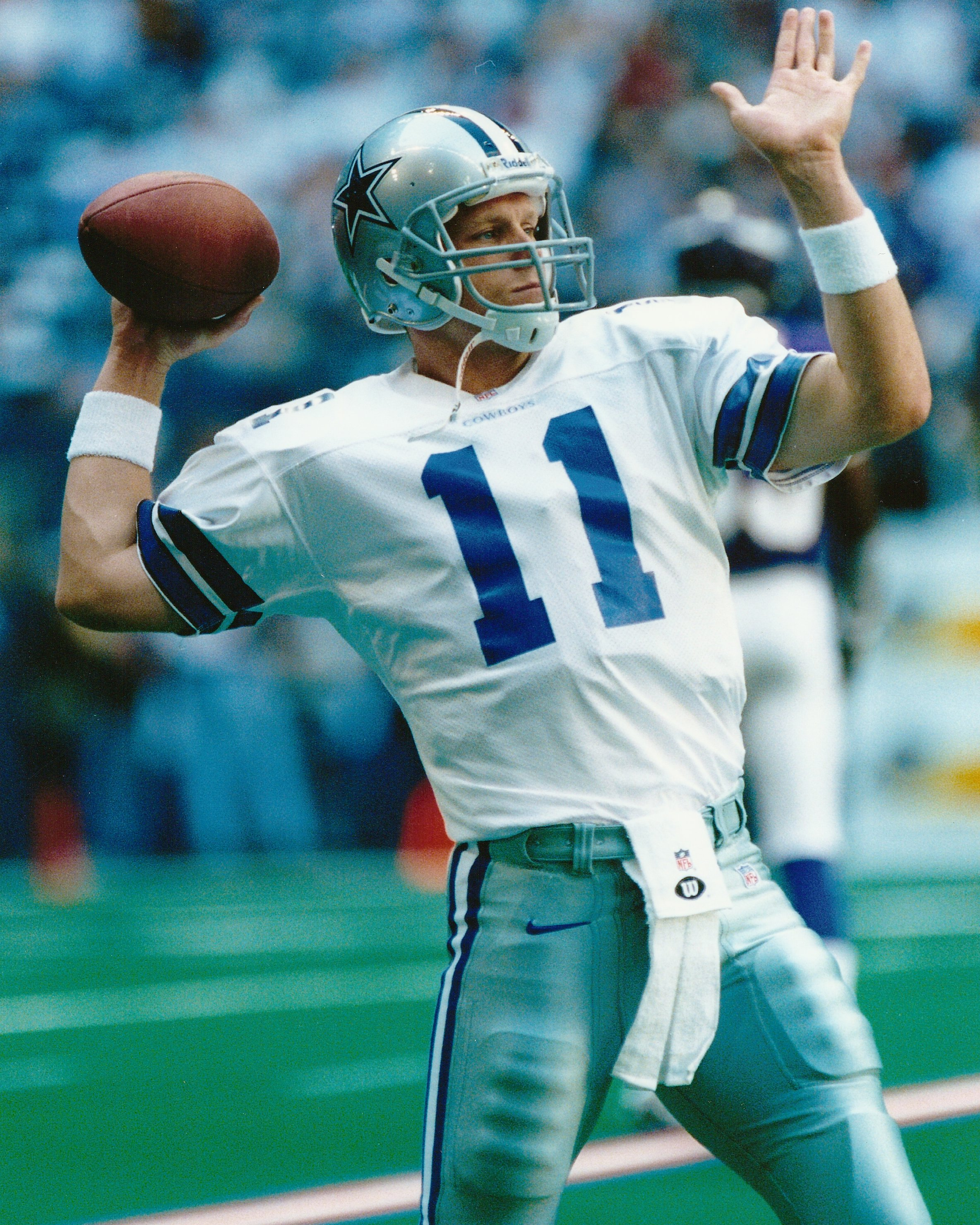
- Quinn with the Dallas Cowboys in 1999

No. 11, 12
- Position: Quarterback

Personal information
- Born: April 15, 1974 (age 52); Las Vegas, Nevada, U.S.
- Listed height: 6 ft 4 in (1.93 m)
- Listed weight: 215 lb (98 kg)

Career information
- High school: Robert E. Lee (Houston, Texas)
- College: Stephen F. Austin
- NFL draft: 1997: undrafted

Career history
- Pittsburgh Steelers (1997); Rhein Fire (1998); Indianapolis Colts (1998); Dallas Cowboys (1998–1999); Miami Dolphins (2000); Houston Texans (2002–2003); Denver Broncos (2004)*; Pittsburgh Steelers (2004)*; Montreal Alouettes (2005)*; Winnipeg Blue Bombers (2006)
- * Offseason or practice squad member only

Awards and highlights
- World Bowl champion (VI); All-NFL (1998); All-Southland Conference (1996)

Career NFL statistics
- Passing attempts: 3
- Passing completions: 2
- Completion percentage: 66.7%
- TD–INT: 0–0
- Passing yards: 20
- Passer rating: 85.4
- Stats at Pro Football Reference

Career CFL statistics
- TD–INT: 3–5
- Passing yards: 355
- Passer rating: 55.8

Michael Patrick Quinn (born April 15, 1974) is an American former professional football player who was a quarterback in the National Football League (NFL) for the Pittsburgh Steelers, Indianapolis Colts, Dallas Cowboys, Miami Dolphins, Houston Texans, and Denver Broncos. He also was a member of the Rhein Fire of NFL Europe, and the Montreal Alouettes and Winnipeg Blue Bombers of the Canadian Football League (CFL). He played college football for the Stephen F. Austin Lumberjacks.

== Early life ==
Quinn attended Robert E. Lee High School in Houston, Texas, where he played quarterback. As a senior, he received All-state and All-Greater Houston honors.

== College career ==
He walked-on at Division I-AA Stephen F. Austin State University. He was a backup quarterback behind James Ritchey during his first three seasons. As a junior in 1995, during a game against Southwest Texas State on November 12, Quinn came into the game in place of Ritchey and threw three touchdown passes.

As a senior in 1996, he became the starting quarterback after Ritchey graduated, throwing for 136 completions for 2,049 yards, 15 touchdowns and 10 interceptions. In the game against Samford on October 27, Quinn led Stephen F. Austin to a 43–14 win after throwing a touchdown pass to wide receiver Chris Jefferson at the end of the first half. SFA held the lead for the rest of the game. Against McNeese State on November 3, Quinn led a come from behind win for SFA by throwing two touchdowns to Mikhael Ricks in the fourth quarter. The next week, Quinn threw for 283 yards and threw four touchdown passes to lead Stephen F. Austin to another win making them 7–2. Against Delta State University, he had 19 out of 33 completions for 362 yards and 3 touchdowns, receiving Southland Offensive Player of the Week honors. He finished his college career after playing in 28 games and passing for 2,641 yards and 23 touchdowns.

== Professional career ==
=== Pittsburgh Steelers (first stint) ===
Quinn began his career by signing with the Fountain Tadpoles of the Eastern North Carolina Football League, but when the league folded after just one season, Quinn decided to go to the NFL. Quinn signed with the Pittsburgh Steelers as an undrafted free agent following the 1997 NFL draft. Quinn entered training camp behind Kordell Stewart, Mike Tomczak and Jim Miller on the depth chart, but after training camp Quinn had beaten out Miller and became the team's third-string quarterback. He saw his only game action on November 9 against the Baltimore Ravens, throwing for 10 yards on one completion.

Following the 1997 season, the Steelers allocated Quinn to play in NFL Europe; he later agreed to play for the Rhein Fire. In his second game with the Fire on April 12, Quinn completed 13 of 21 passes for 194 yards. He also completed two touchdown passes. With Quinn as the starting quarterback, the Fire played in the World Bowl. However, Quinn was hampered by a sprained ankle and could not play in the game. He finished with 133 completions for 1,997 yards, 13 touchdowns and 3 interceptions. He returned to the Steelers after the NFL Europe season but was waived on August 31, after being passed on the depth chart by Pete Gonzalez.

=== Indianapolis Colts ===
After being waived by Pittsburgh, Quinn was claimed off waivers by the Indianapolis Colts on September 1. To make room for Quinn the Colts had to release Jim Miller, who had lost a roster spot on the Steelers to Quinn a year earlier. However, after signing Doug Nussmeier, the Colts waived Quinn.

=== Dallas Cowboys ===
On September 10, 1998, the Dallas Cowboys, who were unsuccessful claiming Quinn 10 days earlier, claimed him after he was waived by the Colts, reuniting with head coach Chan Gailey, who was his offensive coordinator with the Steelers. He became the Cowboys second-string quarterback after Troy Aikman was injured and Jason Garrett became the starter. He played in three games for the Cowboys in 1998, completing one pass for 10 yards.

In 1999, Quinn did not play in a game as the third-string quarterback behind Aikman and Garrett.

In 2000, Garrett signed as a free agent with the New York Giants and quarterback Paul Justin was signed by Dallas to compete for the backup spot on April 7. On May 5, 2000, he was released when the team chose to sign undrafted free agent Clint Stoerner to compete for a backup position.

=== Miami Dolphins ===
On May 23, 2000, Quinn signed with the Miami Dolphins, reuniting with Gailey who was the offensive coordinator. He was named the third-string quarterback over Jim Druckenmiller at the end of the preseason. On November 6, Quinn threw a touchdown pass to Deon Dyer but was waived by the Dolphins on November 10, only to be re-signed four days later. In the 2001 preseason, Quinn sprained a joint in his shoulder and was waived/injured. He was released from injured reserve with an injury settlement on September 6.

=== Houston Texans ===
The Houston Texans, the newest franchise in the NFL, signed Quinn to a reserve/future contract on December 30, 2001. Following the 2002 NFL draft in which the Texans drafted quarterback David Carr with their first ever pick, Quinn became the backup. Quinn and Tony Banks ended up winning the backup jobs to Carr over Kent Graham and Ben Sankey. Banks was second–string with Quinn being the third–string quarterback. The Texans waived Quinn during final cuts on August 25, 2003. He was the final member of the Texans first signings still on the team. He was re-signed to the practice squad on November 17 after David Carr suffered a sprained right shoulder. However, when Banks also became injured, Quinn was signed from the practice squad to back up the now healthy Carr and rookie Dave Ragone.

=== Denver Broncos ===
The Denver Broncos signed Quinn as an unrestricted free agent in March 2004. At the end of training camp, Quinn was released by the Broncos.

=== Pittsburgh Steelers (second stint) ===
Quinn was re-signed by the Steelers on September 22 and assigned to their practice squad. He was released from the practice squad on November 10.

=== Montreal Alouettes ===
On August 29, 2005, Quinn was signed to the practice roster of the Montreal Alouettes in the Canadian Football League.

=== Winnipeg Blue Bombers ===
On March 22, 2006, the Winnipeg Blue Bombers signed Quinn, joining quarterbacks Tee Martin, Russ Michna and Kevin Glenn on Winnipeg's roster. In his CFL preseason debut against the Alouettes on June 2, Quinn threw a 24-yard touchdown pass to Quentin McCord however the Blue Bombers lost 25–24. After making the team out of training camp, Quinn injured his sternum and shoulder which caused him to miss three weeks. In his first week back with Winnipeg, Quinn was forced into the starting role after Glenn suffered a knee injury. However, a string of poor performances which included an interception in the end zone while Winnipeg was in field goal position led to his release on August 28.

== Personal life ==
Currently, Quinn and his wife, Jennifer, live in Houston, Texas. At Stephen F. Austin State University, he majored in accounting.
