= Rod Robinson =

American football player (born 1976)

No. 8, 10
- Position: Quarterback

Personal information
- Born: May 17, 1976 (age 50); Memphis, Tennessee, U.S.
- Listed height: 6 ft 4 in (1.93 m)
- Listed weight: 240 lb (109 kg)

Career information
- High school: Memphis (TN) Fairley
- College: Arkansas-Pine Bluff (1994–1998)
- NFL draft: 1999: undrafted

Career history
- Indianapolis Colts (1999)*; Philadelphia Eagles (1999)*; Jacksonville Jaguars (2000)*; Barcelona Dragons (2001); Indianapolis Colts (2001); Jacksonville Jaguars (2001–2002); Memphis Xplorers (2003); Las Vegas Gladiators (2004–2005)
- * Offseason or practice squad member only

Career AFL statistics
- Comp. / Att.: 51 / 74
- Passing yards: 540
- TD–INT: 6-6
- QB rating: 76.41
- Rushing TDs: 4
- Stats at ArenaFan.com

Roderick "Rod" Robinson (born May 17, 1976) is an American former football quarterback who played two seasons for the Las Vegas Gladiators of the Arena Football League, as well as a season in NFL Europe for the Barcelona Dragons and a season in the af2 for the Memphis Xplorers. He also spent 3 years on the practice squads of the Indianapolis Colts, Philadelphia Eagles and Jacksonville Jaguars.

== Professional career ==
=== Indianapolis Colts ===
Robinson went undrafted in the 1999 NFL draft, and signed as an undrafted free agent with the Indianapolis Colts on April 21, 1999. He competed with Kelly Holcomb, Stoney Case and Jim Kubiak for the backup quarterback position to Peyton Manning, but failed to make the team's roster.

=== Philadelphia Eagles ===
On September 14, 1999, Robinson was signed to the Philadelphia Eagles' practice squad. He was released on October 19, 1999.

=== Jacksonville Jaguars ===
Robinson signed with the Jacksonville Jaguars during the 2000 offseason, and was a preseason member of the squad. He was released on August 22, 2000.

=== Barcelona Dragons ===
Robinson appeared in a few games for the Barcelona Dragons during the 2001 season, throwing for 474 yards with 2 touchdowns and 4 interceptions. He also ran for 49 yards and a touchdown.

=== Indianapolis Colts ===
Robinson returned to the Colts in 2001, winning the team's 3rd string quarterback position behind Manning and Mark Rypien. Robinson was released after Week 10 of the regular season on November 21, 2001.

=== Jacksonville Jaguars ===
On November 22, 2001, just days after his release from Indianapolis, the Jaguars signed Robinson to the practice squad. Robinson finished the season with the Jaguars. He was re-signed by the Jaguars in April, 2002, and was released by the team in August 2002.

=== Memphis Xplorers ===
On April 11, 2003, Robinson signed with the Memphis Xplorers of af2.

=== Las Vegas Gladiators ===
Robinson signed with the Las Vegas Gladiators for the 2004 season, where he won the backup job to Clint Dolezel. After an entire season as a backup, Robinson started for the Dolezel in Week 2 of the 2005 regular season.
