= Mark Baltz =

American football official (born 1948)

Mark Baltz (born February 20, 1948) is a former official in the National Football League (NFL) from 1989 through 2013. He has worked as a head linesman throughout his entire career in the NFL and has been assigned to 21 post-season games, including five conference championship games (1998, 1999, 2000, 2001, 2004). He wore uniform number 26 and 85.

Baltz is a native of Lancaster, Ohio, and a graduate of Ohio University, where he began his officiating career in 1967, while attending college, working both Ohio high school football and basketball games until 1970.

In 1971, Mark moved to Indiana and continued to officiate football and basketball games at the high school level where he worked two state championship games in football (1978 and 1983) before moving to the major college level in 1984. He officiated Boy's high school basketball for 45 seasons ending that career in 2011–12. He worked three state championship games in 1999, 2003 and 2006. He continues to officiate Women's College Basketball at the small college levels.

In 1984, Baltz joined the Mid-American Conference (Division I-A) where he served as referee (crew chief) until moving to the Big Ten Conference (Division I-A). In the Big Ten, he officiated in three bowl games as head linesman in his five years in the conference before being accepted to the NFL in 1989.

Along with his 21 post-season assignments in the NFL, Mark served as referee in NFL Europe for three seasons between 1999 and 2001 and served as Treasurer of the National Football League Referees Association (NFLRA) board for 15 seasons, from 2000 to 2014. Baltz currently serves as the Supervisor of Football Officials for the Heartland Collegiate Athletic Conference. He also serves as the President & CEO of the start-up website, The Tyros, LLC, designed for video study for sports officials, as well as many other potential video and training applications for numerous levels of athletics.

Mark is married to Nicki, and they have two sons, Brett and Brandon, along with 5 grandchildren. Outside of the NFL, Mark previously served on the Indiana Officials Association board for over 20 years, is a founding Director of the Indiana Football Officials Association, an alumni member of Pi Kappa Phi fraternity, a member of the Board of Directors of the Indiana Basketball Hall of Fame, Secretary of the Central Indiana Chapter of the National Football Foundation/College Football Hall of Fame. He is self-employed as a consultant, clinician and public speaker. He resides in Zionsville, Indiana, where he enjoys watching the TV series Young Sheldon.

== Awards ==
- 2005 NFHS Officials Association State Award Winner
