= World Bowl IX =

2001 NFL Europe championship game

Berlin Thunder (2nd)	Barcelona Dragons (1st)
24	17
	1	2	3	4	Total
BER	4	6	0	14	24
BAR	3	6	8	0	17
- Date: Saturday, June 30, 2001
- Stadium: Amsterdam ArenA; Amsterdam, Netherlands
- MVP: Jonathan Quinn, Quarterback
- Referee: Terry McAulay
- Attendance: 32,116

Ceremonies
- Halftime show: Coolio

TV in the United States
- Network: Fox
- Announcers: Curt Menefee and Brian Baldinger

World Bowl IX was the ninth championship game of the NFL Europe League. It was held at the Amsterdam ArenA in Amsterdam, Netherlands on June 30, 2001. The game was between the Barcelona Dragons, who finished the season in first place with a record of 8–2, and the second-placed Berlin Thunder, which finished with a 6–4 record. 32,116 spectators witnessed Berlin's first World Bowl title, as the team pulled off an upset over the Dragons, with a final score of 24–17. Thunder quarterback Jonathan Quinn earned MVP honors with his performance of 25 completions on 38 attempts for 308 yards with three touchdowns and two interceptions. It was the first World Bowl that didn't have the year that it was played in the title.

== Background ==
Prior to this World Bowl, the Dragons won the regular season series against the Thunder, 21–14 on the road and 55–35 at home.

== Game summary ==
After both teams failed to score on either of their respective opening drives, the Thunder struck first with Scott Bentley getting four points on a 53-yard field goal. Near the end of the quarter, the Dragons got on the board as Jesús Angoy kicked a 20-yard field goal. In the second quarter, the Dragons got the lead for the first time of the game with Angoy kicking a 29-yard field goal on Barcelona's opening drive of the second quarter. On their next possession, the Dragons got the ball at their own 19-yard line. Despite an impressive drive, consisting of 12 plays and covering 65 yards, the Thunder defense made the Dragons kick a 33-yard field goal instead. Nearing the end of the half, quarterback Jonathan Quinn and the Thunder responded with a four-play, 67-yard drive that ended with a 46-yard pass to wide receiver Dwaune Jones. However, the two-point conversion pass to Ahmad Merritt was overthrown and no good. So, the score at halftime was 10–9, in favor of the Thunder. In the only score of the third quarter, the Dragons used their second drive of the half to cover 74 yards on just four plays and cap it off with a 58-yard pass from Dragons quarterback Jarious Jackson to Tony Simmons. Afterwards, Jackson managed to complete a two-point conversion by passing to Trevor Insley. Trailing 17–10 going into the fourth quarter, Berlin needed to get a least a touchdown with a successful point after touchdown in order to at least tie. The Thunder would manage to get a seven-play, 68-yard drive and end it with a 17-yard pass to Merritt, making up for the missed two-point. After German kicker Axel Kruse nailed the extra point, the score was tied 17–17. On their next possession, the Thunder would use the opportunity to strike, as Quinn threw the game-winning 53-yard touchdown pass to Jones. After Kruse completed the extra point, Berlin would hold off the following Dragon drive and win their first World Bowl title in franchise history.

=== Scoring summary ===
	1	2	3	4	Total
Thunder	4	6	0	14	24
Dragons	3	6	8	0	17

- BER – Scott Bentley 53 yd FG 9:32 1st (BER 4–0)
- BAR – Jesus Angoy 20 yd FG 14:10 1st (BER 4–3)
- BAR – Jesus Angoy 29 yd FG 3:39 2nd (BAR 6–4)
- BAR – Jesus Angoy 33 yd FG 12:30 2nd (BAR 9–4)
- BER – Dwaune Jones 46 yd TD pass from Jonathan Quinn (conversion failed) 13:57 2nd (BER 10–9)
- BAR – Tony Simmons 58 yd TD pass from Jarious Jackson (Trevor Insley 2-pt conversion pass from Jarious Jackson) 6:52 3rd (BAR 17–10)
- BER – Ahmad Merritt 17 yd TD pass from Jonathan Quinn (Bentley kick) 5:13 4th (17-17)
- BER – Dwaune Jones 53 yd TD pass from Jonathan Quinn (Bentley kick) 10:52 4th (BER 24–17)
