= 2001 NFL Europe season =

European-American football season

The 2001 NFL Europe season was the ninth season in 11 years of the American football league that started out as the World League of American Football.

NFL Europe League
Team	W	L	T	PCT	PF	PA	Home	Road	STK
Barcelona Dragons	8	2	0	.800	252	191	5–0	3–2	L1
Berlin Thunder	6	4	0	.600	270	239	4–1	2–3	W2
Rhein Fire	5	5	0	.500	174	179	4–1	1–4	L1
Scottish Claymores	4	6	0	.400	168	188	4–1	0–5	W1
Amsterdam Admirals	4	6	0	.400	194	226	4–1	0–5	L3
Frankfurt Galaxy	3	7	0	.300	199	234	3–2	0–5	W1

== World Bowl IX ==
Berlin 24-17 Barcelona Saturday, June 30, 2001 Amsterdam ArenA Amsterdam, Netherlands
