= 2003 Frankfurt Galaxy season =

NFL Europe team season

- General manager: Tilman Engel
- Head coach: Doug Graber
- Home stadium: Waldstadion

Results
- Record: 6–4
- Division place: 1st
- Playoffs: World Bowl XI champion

The 2003 Frankfurt Galaxy season was the 11th season for the franchise in the NFL Europe League (NFLEL). The team was led by head coach Doug Graber in his third year, and played its home games at Waldstadion in Frankfurt, Germany. They finished the regular season in first place with a record of six wins and four losses. In World Bowl XI, Frankfurt defeated the Rhein Fire 35–16. The victory marked the franchise's third World Bowl championship.

== Offseason ==
=== Free agent draft ===
2003 Frankfurt Galaxy NFLEL free agent draft selections
Draft order		Player name	Position	College
Round	Choice	Player name	Position	College
1	4	Al Lucas	DT	Troy State
2	10	Fred Jones	LB	Colorado
3	15	Dustin Cohen	LB	Miami (Ohio)
4	22	Jonas Lewis	RB	San Diego State
5	27	Derick Pack	LB	James Madison
6	34	Deshawn Abram	CB	Wyoming
7	39	Calvin Spears	CB	Grambling State
8	46	Ennis Davis	DT	Southern California
9	51	David Pruce	T	Buffalo
10	58	Chris Cummings	CB	Louisiana State
11	63	Bryan Ray	DE	Wake Forest
12	70	Rashidi Barnes	S	Colorado
13	75	Gregg Kellett	TE	Marshall
14	82	Justin Gallimore	CB	Colorado State
15	87	Josh Whitman	TE	Illinois
16	94	Adam Tate	RB	Utah
17	99	Jeremy Beutler	LB	Ohio
18	106	Corey Mitchell	T	Massachusetts
19	111	Kevin Thompson	QB	Penn State
20	117	Frank Cutolo	WR	Eastern Illinois

== Personnel ==
=== Staff ===
2003 Frankfurt Galaxy (NFL Europe) staff
Front office: General manager – Tilman Engel; Head coaches: Head coach – Doug Graber; Offensive coaches: Offensive coordinator/quarterbacks/wide receivers – Dwain Painter; National coach/running backs – Patrick Esume; Tight ends – Eric Green; Offensive line – Don Lawrence	Defensive coaches: Defensive coordinator/linebackers – Bob Valesente; Defensive line – Richard Wood; Defensive backs/special teams – Ken Stills; Strength and conditioning: Strength and conditioning – Mike Berezowski

=== Roster ===
2003 Frankfurt Galaxy final roster
Quarterbacks: 5 James Brown; 7 Quinn Gray; Running backs: 30 Robert Gillespie; 25 Jonas Lewis; 44 Corey McIntyre; 21 Adam Tate; Wide receivers: 83 Robert Baker; 10 Marc Lester; 1 Brian McDonald; Tight ends: 81 Kori Dickerson; 87 Josh Whitman	Offensive linemen: 70 Chris Brown T; 66 Pete Campion G; 65 Mike Clare G/C (IR); 60 Joe Jackson C; 76 Doug Kaufusi T; 79 Corey Mitchell G; 69 Michael Moore G; 74 David Pruce T; 78 Kendrick Rogers T; Defensive linemen: 99 Luis Almanzar DT; 75 Joey Evans DE; 94 Devon Finn DE; 98 Buck Gurley DT; 93 John Schlecht DE/DT; 97 Johnny Thomas DT; 96 Daryl Whittington DE (IR)	Linebackers: 56 Dustin Cohen OLB; 52 Pernell Griffin MLB; 55 Fred Jones MLB; 58 Jody Littleton OLB; 54 Idris Price OLB; Defensive backs: 28 Rashidi Barnes S; 29 Chris Cummings CB; 36 Kalvin Pearson CB; 26 Jon Pendergrass CB (IR); 35 Chris Pointer CB; 38 Calvin Spears S; 27 Jeremy Unertl CB/S; 33 Chris Young S; Special teams: 15 Jon Hilbert K; 8 Tim Morgan P	National players: 90 (Germany) Daniel Benetka DE; 67 (Germany) Dennis Engelbrecht DT; 23 (Finland) Eero Heinonen RB; 86 (Germany) Werner Hippler TE; 9 (Germany) Ralf Kleinmann K; 85 (Mexico) Hugo Lira WR; 19 (France) Marc Soumah WR; 46 (Turkey) Cüneyt Topcu OLB; Rookies in italics

== Standings ==
NFL Europe League
Team	W	L	T	PCT	PF	PA	Home	Road	STK
Frankfurt Galaxy	6	4	0	.600	252	182	4–1	2–3	L1
Rhein Fire	6	4	0	.600	189	188	4–1	2–3	W1
Scottish Claymores	6	4	0	.600	303	190	3–2	3–2	W4
FC Barcelona Dragons	5	5	0	.500	150	221	2–3	3–2	L3
Amsterdam Admirals	4	6	0	.400	230	273	2–3	2–3	L1
Berlin Thunder	3	7	0	.300	248	318	2–3	1–4	W1

== Game summaries ==
=== World Bowl XI ===
World Bowl XI: Rhein Fire vs Frankfurt Galaxy – Game summary

Quarter	1	2	3	4	Total
Rhein	3	6	0	7	16
Frankfurt	11	14	7	3	35

at Hampden Park, Glasgow, Scotland

- Date: Saturday, June 14
- Game time: 6:06 p.m. CEST
- Game weather: 76 °F (24 °C), sunny with clear skies
- Game attendance: 28,138
- Referee: Pete Morelli
- TV announcers (FOX): Curt Menefee and Brian Baldinger
