= 2003 Rhein Fire season =

NFL Europe team season

- General manager: Alexander Leibkind
- Head coach: Pete Kuharchek
- Home stadium: Arena AufSchalke

Results
- Record: 6–4
- Division place: 2nd
- Playoffs: Lost World Bowl XI

The 2003 Rhein Fire season was the ninth season for the franchise in the NFL Europe League (NFLEL). The team was led by head coach Pete Kuharchek in his third year, and played its home games at Arena AufSchalke in Gelsenkirchen, Germany. They finished the regular season in second place with a record of six wins and four losses. In World Bowl XI, Rhein lost to the Frankfurt Galaxy 35–16.

== Offseason ==
=== Free agent draft ===
2003 Rhein Fire NFLEL free agent draft selections
| Draft order | | Player name | Position | College |
| Round | Choice | Player name | Position | College |
|---|---|---|---|---|
| 1 | 5 | Derrick Ham | DE | Miami |
| 2 | 11 | Dwayne Ledford | G | East Carolina |
| 3 | 14 | Gillis Wilson | DE | Southern |
| 4 | 23 | Shad Criss | CB | Missouri |
| 5 | 26 | Lew Thomas | RB | Vanderbilt |
| 6 | 35 | Andre Arnold | LB | Grambling State |
| 7 | 38 | Todd DeLamielleure | LB | Hofstra |
| 8 | 47 | Jonathan Burrough | TE | New Mexico |
| 9 | 50 | Kwazi Leverette | WR | Syracuse |
| 10 | 59 | Greg Brown | S | Texas |
| 11 | 62 | Corey Callens | DE | Oklahoma |
| 12 | 71 | Jamel Smith | LB | Virginia Tech |
| 13 | 74 | Jeff McCurley | C | Pittsburgh |
| 14 | 83 | Ataveus Cash | WR | Hampton |
| 15 | 86 | Lawrence Story | WR | Jackson State |
| 16 | 95 | Frank Moreau | RB | Louisville |
| 17 | 98 | Kendall Newson | WR | Middle Tennessee |
| 18 | 107 | Shane O’Neill | S | Southern Methodist |
| 19 | 110 | Mike Watkins | QB | Louisville |
| 20 | 118 | Bob Dzvonick | DT | Buffalo |

== Personnel ==
=== Staff ===
2003 Rhein Fire staff
| Front office: General manager – Alexander Leibkind; Head coaches: Head coach/defensive coordinator – Pete Kuharchek; Offensive coaches: Offensive coordinator/wide receivers – Mike Jones; Quarterbacks – Scott Milanovich; Running backs – Barry Foster; Offensive line – Whitey Jordan | Defensive coaches: Defensive line/special teams – Ed O'Neil; National coach/linebackers – Jörn Maier; Defensive backs – Adrian White; Strength and conditioning: Strength and conditioning – Brian Ferguson |

=== Roster ===
2003 Rhein Fire final roster
| Quarterbacks: 14 Chris Greisen; 12 Nick Rolovich; 11 Mike Watkins; Running backs: 23 Autry Denson; 32 Frank Moreau; 44 Matt Stanley; Wide receivers: 81 Charlie Adams; 89 LaVell Boyd; 84 Ataveus Cash (IR); 80 Todd Elstrom; 88 Emmett Johnson (IR); 83 Shawn Mills; 87 Kendall Newson; 82 Royd Williams; Tight ends: 47 Dwayne Blakley; 45 Chad Mustard; 84 Ryan Prince | Offensive linemen: 65 Luke Butkus C; 73 Pat Crummey G; 61 Jim Jones G; 75 Dustin Keith C; 76 Dwayne Ledford T; 62 Scot Osborne T; 70 Joey Slaten T; Defensive linemen: 91 Andre Arnold DE; 92 Corey Callens DE; 71 Derrick Ham DE; 98 Brad Harris DT; 95 Josh McKibben DT; 64 David Viger DT; 96 Jesse Warren DE; 97 Gillis Wilson DE | Linebackers: 51 Charles Burton OLB; 55 Todd DeLamielleure MLB (IR); 56 Terrance Dukes MLB; 52 Jason Johnson MLB; 58 Dane Krager OLB; 53 Courtney Ledyard MLB (IR); 57 Jamel Smith OLB; Defensive backs: 25 Adesola Badon CB; 24 Greg Brown FS; 30 Teddy Gaines CB; 41 Abdual Howard SS; 20 Lemual Ligon FS; 37 Tony Lukins CB; 39 Tierre Sams CB; Special teams: 13 Todd France K; 6 Jay Taylor P | National players: 8 (Germany) Ingo Anderbrügge K; 50 (Germany) Anthony Doghmi OLB (IR); 74 (Germany) Peter Heyer G; 72 (Germany) Bastian Lano DT; 9 (Germany) Christopher Liess WR; 21 (Nigeria) Oyeniran Olalere Odunayo Ojo RB; 99 (Sweden) Dan Petersson DT; 60 (Germany) Patrick Venzke T; 35 (Germany) Richard Yancy SS; Rookies in italics |

== Schedule ==
| Week | Date | Kickoff (Note: All times local to where the game was played.) | Opponent | Results | | Game site | Attendance |
| Week | Date | Kickoff | Opponent | Final score | Team record | Game site | Attendance |
|---|---|---|---|---|---|---|---|
| 1 | Saturday, April 5 | 7:00 p.m. | Amsterdam Admirals | L 15–17 | 0–1 | Arena AufSchalke | 28,206 |
| 2 | Sunday, April 13 | 4:00 p.m. | at Berlin Thunder | W 21–10 | 1–1 | Olympic Stadium | 16,312 |
| 3 | Saturday, April 19 | 7:00 p.m. | Scottish Claymores | W 34–17 | 2–1 | Arena AufSchalke | 43,985 |
| 4 | Saturday, April 26 | 5:00 p.m. | at Barcelona Dragons | L 3–11 | 2–2 | Mini Estadi | 6,182 |
| 5 | Saturday, May 3 | 7:00 p.m. | Frankfurt Galaxy | W 14–7 | 3–2 | Arena AufSchalke | 42,324 |
| 6 | Saturday, May 10 | 7:00 p.m. | at Amsterdam Admirals | W 34–27 | 4–2 | Amsterdam ArenA | 11,672 |
| 7 | Sunday, May 18 | 3:00 p.m. | at Scottish Claymores | L 0–33 | 4–3 | Hampden Park | 8,279 |
| 8 | Sunday, May 25 | 4:00 p.m. | Berlin Thunder | W 28–21 | 5–3 | Arena AufSchalke | 27,895 |
| 9 | Sunday, June 1 | 4:00 p.m. | at Frankfurt Galaxy | L 7–38 | 5–4 | Waldstadion | 25,539 |
| 10 | Saturday, June 7 | 7:00 p.m. | Barcelona Dragons | W 33–7 | 6–4 | Arena AufSchalke | 28,678 |

== Standings ==
NFL Europe League
| Team | W | L | T | PCT | PF | PA | Home | Road | STK |
|---|---|---|---|---|---|---|---|---|---|
| Frankfurt Galaxy | 6 | 4 | 0 | .600 | 252 | 182 | 4–1 | 2–3 | L1 |
| Rhein Fire | 6 | 4 | 0 | .600 | 189 | 188 | 4–1 | 2–3 | W1 |
| Scottish Claymores | 6 | 4 | 0 | .600 | 303 | 190 | 3–2 | 3–2 | W4 |
| FC Barcelona Dragons | 5 | 5 | 0 | .500 | 150 | 221 | 2–3 | 3–2 | L3 |
| Amsterdam Admirals | 4 | 6 | 0 | .400 | 230 | 273 | 2–3 | 2–3 | L1 |
| Berlin Thunder | 3 | 7 | 0 | .300 | 248 | 318 | 2–3 | 1–4 | W1 |

== Game summaries ==
=== World Bowl XI ===
World Bowl XI: Rhein Fire vs Frankfurt Galaxy – Game summary

| Quarter | 1 | 2 | 3 | 4 | Total |
|---|---|---|---|---|---|
| Rhein | 3 | 6 | 0 | 7 | 16 |
| Frankfurt | 11 | 14 | 7 | 3 | 35 |

at Hampden Park, Glasgow, Scotland

- Date: Saturday, June 14
- Game time: 5:06 p.m. BST
- Game weather: 76 °F (24 °C), sunny with clear skies
- Game attendance: 28,138
- Referee: Pete Morelli
- TV announcers (FOX): Curt Menefee and Brian Baldinger
