= Rashidi Barnes =

American football player (born 1978)

No. 28, 26
- Position: Safety

Personal information
- Born: June 26, 1978 (age 48); Berkeley, California, U.S.
- Listed height: 5 ft 11 in (1.80 m)
- Listed weight: 205 lb (93 kg)

Career information
- High school: Berkeley
- College: Colorado
- NFL draft: 2000: 7th round, 225th overall pick

Career history
- Cleveland Browns (2000–2001); Dallas Cowboys (2002)*; Frankfurt Galaxy (2002–2003); Washington Redskins (2003)*
- * Offseason or practice squad member only

Awards and highlights
- World Bowl champion (XI); 1999 Insight.com Bowl champion

Career NFL statistics
- Games: 14
- Tackles: 21
- Stats at Pro Football Reference

Rashidi Jahi Barnes (born June 26, 1978) is an American former professional football player who was a safety in the National Football League (NFL). He played college football for the Colorado Buffaloes. He was selected in the seventh round of the 2000 NFL draft.

== College career ==
Barnes attended Colorado where during three season he appeared in 28 games over three years and recorded three interceptions for 29 return yards, the first of which he returned 26 yards for a touchdown.

On September 6, 1997, Barnes, a sophomore linebacker, recorded his first career interception when on the third play of the second half against Colorado State he intercepted a pass from Moses Moreno returning it 26-yards for a touchdown. Because of his touchdown return he was named the Big 12 Defensive Player-of-the-Week. On November 8, 1997, Barnes recorded his first career start, against Iowa State.

On September 5, 1998, he recorded 13 tackles against Colorado State. On November 14, he recorded his second career interception, this one against Iowa State.

On December 31, 1999, Colorado beat Boston College 62–28 in the Insight.com Bowl. During the game, Barnes, a senior free safety, intercepted quarterback Brian St. Pierre and returned it for 21-yards.

== Professional career ==
=== 2000 NFL draft ===
On April 16, 2000, Barnes was selected in the seventh round (225th overall) of the 2000 NFL draft by the Cleveland Browns.

Pre-draft measurables
Height	Weight	40-yard dash	10-yard split	20-yard split	20-yard shuttle	Three-cone drill	Vertical jump	Broad jump	Bench press
5 11 1/2	208 lb (94 kg)	4.59 s	1.60 s	2.71 s	4.32 s	6.92 s	35 in (0.89 m)	9 ft 6 in (2.90 m)	10 reps
All values from NFL Combine

On July 10, 2000, he signed his rookie four-year contract. As a rookie, he appeared in 14 games recording 14 tackles and one punt return. On September 2, 2001, he was released by the Browns during final cuts. On June 25, 2002, he signed a two-year contract with the Dallas Cowboys. He was released on September 1, 2002, during final cuts.

Barnes played for the Frankfurt Galaxy during the 2002 and 2003 seasons. After two seasons in Europe, he signed a two-year contract with the Washington Redskins on June 18, 2003. He was released on August 18, 2003, during training camp.

== Post-football ==
During 2004 after allegations that Colorado was using sex as a recruiting tool, Barnes was quoted as saying; "These kids are great kids, positive kids. They are not villains, they are not rapists. These kids want to get an education and go to school. That's it. And play football, basketball or whatever else it is," Barnes said.
