= Independence High School (Charlotte, North Carolina) =

American public school in North Carolina

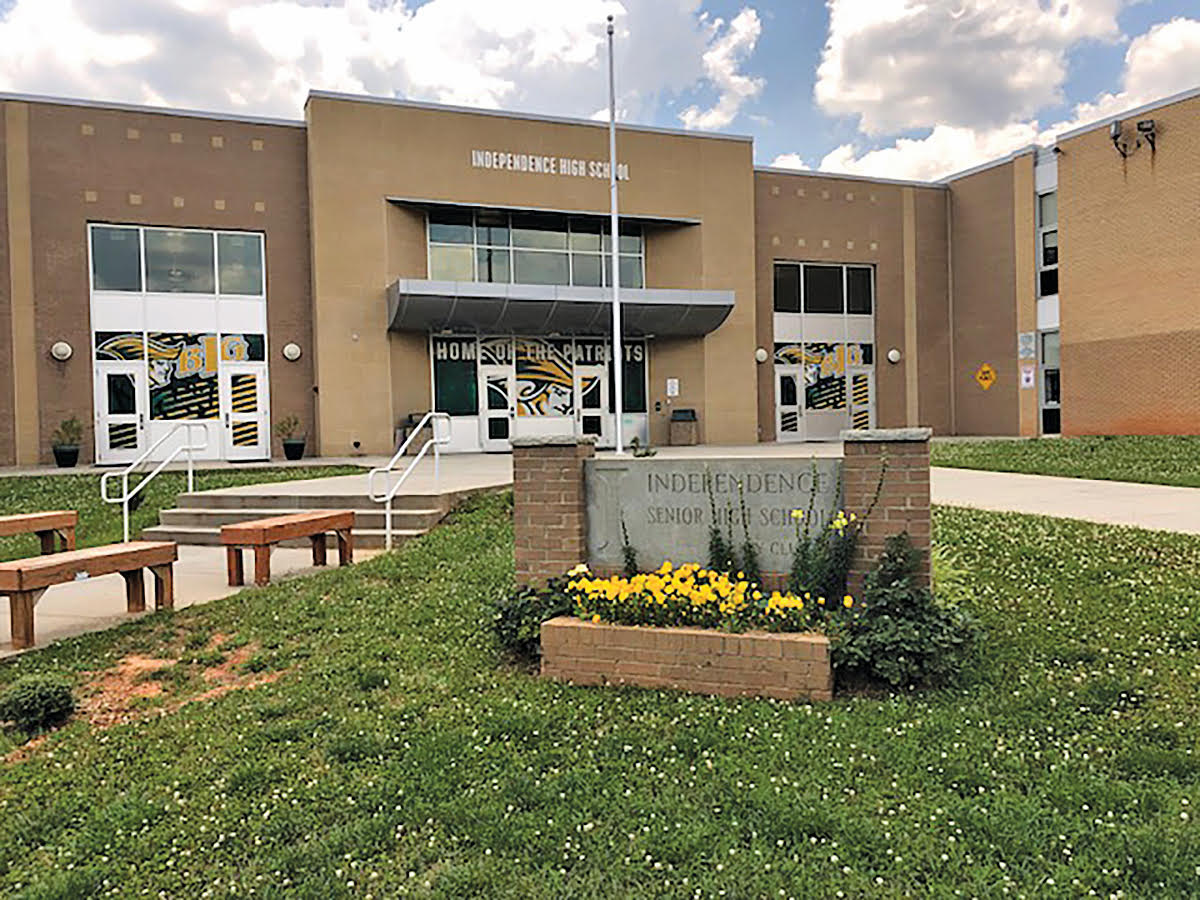
- Independence High School, August 2023

Location
- 1967 Patriot Dr; Charlotte, North Carolina 28227; United States; 35°11′50″N 80°41′14″W

Information
- Other names: The Big I, Indy
- Type: Public
- Motto: "Ensuring success for all students."
- Established: 1967 (59 years ago)
- CEEB code: 340673
- Principal: Amy Mims
- Teaching staff: 115.50 (FTE)
- Enrollment: 2,024 (2024-2025)
- Student to teacher ratio: 17.52
- Colors: Green and gold
- Athletics: NCHSAA 7A
- Athletics conference: Meck Power Six 7A/8A
- Mascot: Patriot
- Website: www.cmsk12.org/independenceHS

Independence High School (or, The Big I) is a high school in Mint Hill, North Carolina (with a Charlotte mailing address). The school mascot is the Patriots and the school colors are green and gold.

== Academics ==
The school no longer has magnet programs, since the International Baccalaureate program was relocated to another school several years ago. However, the Academy of International Studies has now been incorporated into Independence, creating a 'school within a school' feeling. This program is sponsored by the Bill and Melinda Gates Foundation and encourages students to be aware of both their communities and the world. The Academy of Engineering was also later added, which is funded by NAF. In 2006, more than twenty students participated in an exam to be able to attend the Governor's School of North Carolina, a state-sponsored program for extremely gifted students, established by NC senator Terry Sanford. The previous year, six students from Independence met all the requirements to participate in the School. The requirements include writing two essays and receiving teacher recommendations. Though school officials expected more students to be accepted into the program, only two students made the cut in 2007.

== Athletics ==
Independence High School is a member of the North Carolina High School Athletic Association (NCHSAA) and is classified as a 7A school. It is a part of the Meck Power Six 7A/8A Conference. In sports, Independence is also known as "the Big I" or "Indy". The schools team name is the Patriots, with the school colors being green and gold.

Independence Patriots Football

During the 2000s, the Independence varsity football team, coached by Tom Knotts and Bill Geiler, won 109 straight games, that included seven straight North Carolina High School Athletic Association State Championships (2000 4A, 2001 4A, 2002 4AA, 2003 4AA, 2004 4AA, 2005 4AA, 2006 4AA). Their streak ended on September 1, 2007, when Cincinnati Ohio's Elder High School defeated Independence in overtime, 41–34. Independence holds the national record winning streak for a public high school football team, with 109 straight wins without a loss. De La Salle High School holds the longest win streak overall, private or public, with 151 straight wins.

Coach Tom Knotts served as head coach of Independence in six of their seven state championships during their streak. Knotts would win a North Carolina 4A (North Carolina's former highest classification for high school athletics) record of seven state championships, with six state championships won at Independence and one at West Charlotte. He also has the best winning percentage of any NC head football coach to coach at least 20 years or longer. Knotts became known for turning formerly average football teams into powerhouse programs.

In 2004, Coach Knotts left for a season to be the quarterbacks coach for the Duke Blue Devils football program. During Coach Knotts absence, Bill Geiler took over head coaching duties. The Patriots would continue their winning streak during that season, with Independence having the most dominant year in the history of the state averaging 54 points a game and averaging only 8 points against them. The 2004 Independence football team ended that year being the North Carolina 4AA state champions and were also selected by USA High School Football as that years national champions.

Coach Tom Knotts returned as head coach for the 2005 season, where Independence would go on to win three more state championships in a row, without a loss each of those seasons. After Coach Tom Knotts left Independence in 2009, Coach Bill Geiler took back over as head coach for three years from 2010–2012.

During Independence's long winning streak, the football team was invited to appear on the NFL pre-game show before the Carolina Panthers game on Sunday, October 1, 2006.

Independence Patriots Basketball

The Patriots Men's Varsity Basketball team won the NCHSAA 4A State Championship in 1997 versus Richmond Senior High School. The Boys Varsity Basketball team would win the NCHSAA 4A State Championship again in 2018, against Heritage High School.

== Notable alumni ==
- Adonis Alexander, NFL cornerback
- Jacob Coggins, former professional soccer player
- Chelsea Cooley, Miss USA 2005
- Gregory Clifton, former NFL wide receiver
- Joe Cox, former American football quarterback and now coach
- Austin Duke, professional American football wide receiver
- Steve Gabbard, former NFL offensive tackle
- Kim Morgan Greene, TV star and Broadway performer
- Marrio Grier, former NFL running back
- DeVonte Holloman, former NFL linebacker
- Chris Leak, former professional quarterback, led Florida Gators to the 2007 BCS National Championship
- Radell Lockhart, football defensive lineman coach with the Catawba Indians
- Mohamed Massaquoi, former NFL wide receiver
- Dave Moody, artist, producer, songwriter, and filmmaker
- Dre Moore, former NFL defensive tackle
- Hakeem Nicks, former NFL wide receiver, Super Bowl XLVI champion with the New York Giants
- Darryl "D.J." Smith, former NFL linebacker
- Jobey Thomas, professional basketball player
- Jack Tocho, professional football player in the NFL and AAF
- David Venable, QVC host, author
- Tony White, professional basketball player
