= Pete Kuharchek =

American football player and coach (born 1947)

Biographical details
- Born: November 12, 1947 (age 78); Johnstown, Pennsylvania, U.S.
- Died: March 31, 2023; Tampa, Florida, U.S.
- Education: University of Tampa

Playing career
- 1965–1966: George Washington
- 1967–1968: Tampa
- Position: Linebacker

Coaching career (HC unless noted)
- 1969: Tampa (assistant)
- 1972–1975: Tampa Catholic HS (DC)
- 1976: Kentucky (GA)
- 1977–1978: Wisconsin–Eau Claire (DC)
- 1979–1980: Holy Cross (DB)
- 1981–1982: East Tennessee State (DC)
- 1983–1985: Tampa Bay Bandits (AC)
- 1986: Memphis (LB)
- 1987–1989: Memphis (DC)
- 1990: BC Lions (LB)
- 1991: UTEP (LB)
- 1992: Orlando Thunder (DB)
- 1993: UTEP (DB)
- 1994–1995: UTEP (DC)
- 1996–2000: Rhein Fire (DC/LB)
- 2001–2005 2006: Rhein Fire
- 2006: Tampa Bay Storm (QC)
- 2006-2007: Louisiana Tech (ILB)
- 2008: Tampa Bay Storm (DL)
- 2009: Toronto Argonauts (DC)
- 2011: Omaha Nighthawks (DB)
- 2012: Omaha Nighthawks (DC)
- 2015: Toronto Argonauts (ILB)
- 2020: Team 9 (DC)

Head coaching record
- Overall: 24–28 (NFLEL)
- Bowls: 0–2

Accomplishments and honors

Awards
- Tampa Athletic Hall of Fame (2002)

Peter C. Kuharchek (November 12, 1947 – March 31, 2023) was an American football coach and former player, whose coaching career spanned over 40 years at the high school, collegiate and professional levels. He was the head coach for the Rhein Fire of the NFL Europe League (NFLEL) from 2001 to 2005, compiling a record of 24 wins and 28 losses. At the collegiate level, he most notably served as defensive coordinator at the University of Memphis from 1987 to 1989, and the University of Texas at El Paso (UTEP) from 1994 through 1995. Besides his tenure in the NFLEL — which also included stints as assistant for the Orlando Thunder (1992) and Rhein Fire (1996–2000) — Kuharchek worked in four other professional leagues — including the United States Football League (USFL), Canadian Football League (CFL), Arena Football League (AFL), and United Football League (UFL). Most notably, he was the defensive coordinator for the CFL's Toronto Argonauts in 2009.

As of 2020, he was serving as the defensive coordinator of the XFL's Team 9 farm team.

== Playing career ==
A native of Johnstown, Pennsylvania, Kuharchek attended Conemaugh Township High School in Davidsville, Pennsylvania, where he lettered in football, track, and wrestling. Following graduation, he originally enrolled at George Washington University, located in Washington, D.C. Kuharchek played two seasons as a linebacker for the Colonials under head coach Jim Camp. In late November 1966, he was part of the team which played the final game in George Washington football history, a 16–7 loss to Villanova. The school's board of trustees voted to end the football program in January 1967 and Kuharchek transferred to the University of Tampa in Florida. The Pennsylvania native started two seasons at linebacker for the Spartans, which at the time were coached by Fran Curci. He led the team in tackles both of these years. In 1969, Kuharchek graduated with a Bachelor of Science degree in business administration and subsequently joined the Spartans coaching staff, helping to coach the team's linebackers for one season. He was elected to the University of Tampa Athletic Hall of Fame in 2002.

== Coaching career ==
Following a two-year hiatus from football, Kuharchek became an assistant coach at Tampa Catholic High School in 1972, spending the next four years as defensive coordinator at the institute. In 1976, his former college coach Fran Curci, then the head coach at the University of Kentucky, invited him to join his coaching staff as a graduate assistant coach. After only one season with the Wildcats, Kuharchek moved on to the University of Wisconsin–Eau Claire, serving as the Blugolds' defensive coordinator for two years. In 1979, he became the secondary coach at the College of the Holy Cross, located in Worcester, Massachusetts. Kuharchek spend two years on the Crusaders staff before being hired at East Tennessee State University in Johnson City as the Buccaneers defensive coordinator.

In 1983, he entered the professional coaching ranks when he was hired as an assistant coach by the Tampa Bay Bandits of the fledgling United States Football League (USFL). The franchise was coached by former Heisman Trophy winner Steve Spurrier and finished each season of its three-year existence with a winning record. Kuharchek oversaw the team's strength and conditioning program and helped coaching the linebackers. In December 1985, Charlie Bailey was named head coach at Memphis State University — now the University of Memphis. Bailey was one of his coaches at the University of Tampa and both had worked together on the coaching staffs at Kentucky and Tampa Bay. Kuharchek was hired as the Tigers linebackers coach in January 1986 and elevated to the position of defensive coordinator twelve months later.

On January 21, 2009, Kuharchek was named defensive coordinator of the Toronto Argonauts of the Canadian Football League. He returned to the Argonauts in 2015 as the inside linebackers coach, after several seasons with the Omaha Nighthawks.

In 2020, Kuharchek was announced as the defensive assistant coach for Team 9, the internal farm team/practice squad of the revived XFL.

== Head coaching record ==
Year	Team	Overall	Conference	Standing	Bowl/playoffs
Rhein Fire (NFL Europe League) (2001–2005)
2001	Rhein Fire	5–5		3rd	
2002	Rhein Fire	7–4		1st	L World Bowl X
2003	Rhein Fire	6–5		2nd	L World Bowl XI
2004	Rhein Fire	3–7		5th	
2005	Rhein Fire	3–7		6th	
Rhein Fire:		24–28			
Total:		24–28			
