= Jody Littleton =

American football player (born 1974)

No. 58, 63, 57
- Positions: Long snapper, linebacker

Personal information
- Born: October 23, 1974 (age 52); Denver, Colorado, U.S.
- Listed height: 6 ft 1 in (1.85 m)
- Listed weight: 235 lb (107 kg)

Career information
- High school: Brighton (Brighton, Colorado)
- College: Baylor (1994–1997)
- NFL draft: 1998: undrafted

Career history
- Atlanta Falcons (1998)*; New York Giants (2001-2002)*; → Frankfurt Galaxy (2002); Chicago Bears (2002); Detroit Lions (2002–2005); →Frankfurt Galaxy (2003); Cleveland Browns (2005)
- * Offseason or practice squad member only

Awards and highlights
- World Bowl champion (XI)

Career NFL statistics
- Games played: 18
- Stats at Pro Football Reference

Jody E. Littleton (born October 23, 1974) is an American former professional football player who was a long snapper in the National Football League (NFL). He played college football for the Baylor Bears and the Chicago Bears, Detroit Lions, and Cleveland Browns during his National Football League (NFL) career.

== Early life and college ==
Born in Denver, Littleton graduated from Brighton High School in Brighton, Colorado. At Baylor University, Littleton played at long snapper and linebacker for the Baylor Bears from 1994 to 1997. The first-team long snapper in his final three seasons, he had eight tackles in 1996 and 25 tackles in 1997.

== Professional career ==
Following the 1998 NFL draft, Littleton signed as an undrafted free agent with the Atlanta Falcons but was waived on July 2, 1998.

Littleton then was the special teams coordinator at Hico High School in Hico, Texas until signing with the New York Giants on May 14, 2001. He was waived during the preseason on August 28, 2001. He signed again with the Giants on January 9, 2002, and was allocated to the Frankfurt Galaxy of NFL Europe on February 9. With the Galaxy, Littleton played in 10 games at weak side linebacker with five starts, making nine tackles and two passes defended. The Giants waived Littleton on August 27, 2002, prior to the regular season.

On October 16, 2002, Littleton signed with the Chicago Bears. In his first NFL career action, Littleton played in two games with the Bears at long snapper in 2002 before being waived on October 29. He signed with the Detroit Lions practice squad on December 19, 2002; while signed with the Lions, Littleton had his second allocation with the Frankfurt Galaxy on January 30, 2003. Playing in 10 games with six starts at linebacker, Littleton made 12 tackles for the Galaxy and was part of a Galaxy team that won World Bowl XI. The Lions waived Littleton on September 1 but brought him back to the team on December 11, 2003. Littleton played in the final three games of the 2003 season with the Lions in place of injured long snapper Bradford Banta, making one special teams tackle.

In the 2004 season with the Lions, Littleton played in eight games again at linebacker. He made one special teams tackle. The Lions waived Littleton on August 23, 2005, prior to the regular season. He was briefly signed again with the Lions from October 25 to November 1, 2005.

On November 28, 2005, Littleton signed with the Cleveland Browns. Playing primarily at long snapper, Littleton played in five games with five special teams tackles in his final pro football season.
