= Josh Whitman =

American university administrator, lawyer, and football player (born 1978)

Illinois Fighting Illini
- Title: Athletic director

Personal information
- Born: August 5, 1978 (age 48); West Lafayette, Indiana, U.S.
- Listed height: 6 ft 4 in (1.93 m)
- Listed weight: 245 lb (111 kg)

Career information
- High school: West Lafayette (IN) Harrison
- College: Illinois
- NFL draft: 2001: undrafted

Career history

Playing
- Buffalo Bills (2001)*; San Diego Chargers (2001); San Diego Chargers (2002)*; Frankfurt Galaxy (2003); Seattle Seahawks (2003)*; Miami Dolphins (2003); Seattle Seahawks (2004)*
- * Offseason or practice squad member only

Operations
- Wisconsin–La Crosse (2010–2014) Athletic director; Washington University (2014–2016) Athletic director; Illinois (2016–present) Athletic director

Awards and highlights
- As player: World Bowl XI champion (2003)
- Stats at Pro Football Reference

Joshua Harmon Whitman (born August 5, 1978) is an American university administrator, a lawyer, and a former professional football player. He is currently the athletic director at the University of Illinois Urbana–Champaign. Whitman served as the athletic director at University of Wisconsin–La Crosse from 2011 to 2014, and Washington University in St. Louis from 2014 to 2016.

== Education and early career ==
Whitman graduated from Harrison High School in West Lafayette, Indiana in 1997. He played tight end at Illinois from 1997 to 2000 under head coach Ron Turner. Whitman graduated from Illinois in 2001 as a bronze tablet scholar with his B.S degree in finance. In 2004, he retired from the NFL and enrolled in the University of Illinois College of Law. As a law student, Whitman spent time as a law clerk for Michael P. McCuskey and Michael Stephen Kanne, both of whom are United States federal judges. From 2005 to 2008 Whitman also worked in the Illinois athletic department as a special assistant to athletic director Ron Guenther. After receiving his J.D. degree summa cum laude in 2008, Whitman took a job in Washington D.C. working as an attorney for Covington & Burling, which serves as outside legal counsel for the NFL.

== Athletic administration career ==
In 2010, Whitman was hired as the athletic director for NCAA Division III Wisconsin–La Crosse. While Whitman was at Wisconsin–La Crosse, Eagles teams won four national championships and 21 conference titles. Whitman was later named athletic director of Washington University in St. Louis in 2014.

In 2016, Whitman was hired as the 14th athletic director for the University of Illinois. During his time at Illinois; Whitman has fired Bill Cubit, Lovie Smith, and John Groce and also has hired Lovie Smith, Brad Underwood, and Bret Bielema during his tenure. Other notable hires and contract extensions include Shauna Green, Mike Small, Chris Tamas, and Dan Hartleb.
