= David Rivers (disambiguation) =

David Rivers may refer to:

- David Rivers (born 1965), American basketball player
- David Rivers (quarterback) (born 1977), American football player
- David Rivers (cornerback) (born 1994), American football player
- David Foote Rivers (1859–1941), American theologian and politician
