= Shawn Lynch =

American football player (born 1979)

No. 61, 62, 65
- Position: Center

Personal information
- Born: July 25, 1979 (age 47); West Palm Beach, Florida, U.S.
- Listed height: 6 ft 4 in (1.93 m)
- Listed weight: 271 lb (123 kg)

Career information
- High school: Wellington (Wellington, Florida)
- College: Duke
- NFL draft: 2002: undrafted

Career history
- Kansas City Chiefs (2002; 2003}*; FC Barcelona Dragons (2003); Miami Dolphins (2003–2004)*; Hamburg Sea Devils (2005); Minnesota Vikings (2005)*; Arizona Cardinals (2005); St. Louis Rams (2005}*; Arizona Cardinals (2005–2006)
- * Offseason or practice squad member only
- Stats at Pro Football Reference

Shawn Michael Lynch (born July 25, 1979) is an American former professional football player who was a center for the Arizona Cardinals of the National Football League (NFL), as well as the FC Barcelona Dragons and Hamburg Sea Devils of NFL Europe. He played college football for the Duke Blue Devils.

== College career ==
Lynch redshirted his first year at Duke in 1997, then lettered for four years from 1998 to 2001. In 2001, he started all 11 games at center and was recognized as the school's most outstanding offensive lineman.

== Professional career ==
=== Kansas City Chiefs ===
On April 26, 2002, Lynch signed with the Kansas City Chiefs as an undrafted rookie. The Chiefs released him on September 2, 2002.

=== FC Barcelona Dragons ===
After being allocated to NFL Europe, Lynch signed with the FC Barcelona Dragons in 2003. He started all ten games of the 2003 season, which was the team's final season before folding.

=== Miami Dolphins ===
On September 30, 2003, Lynch was signed to the Miami Dolphins practice squad. He remained on the practice squad for the entirety of the 2003 season. He was released by the Dolphins on August 30, 2004.

=== Hamburg Sea Devils ===
Lynch signed with the Hamburg Sea Devils and played ten games with them in 2005, four of which were starts.

=== Minnesota Vikings ===
On June 13, 2005, Lynch signed with the Minnesota Vikings. He was waived by the Vikings on August 22.

=== Arizona Cardinals ===
On August 23, 2005, the Arizona Cardinals claimed Lynch off waivers. On September 11, 2005, in a game against the New York Giants, he became one of only a few players to start at center in their very first NFL game after going undrafted. He was released by the Cardinals two days later on September 13.

On November 22, the Cardinals re-signed Lynch. He played one more game with the team, a 17–13 loss to the Indianapolis Colts on January 1, 2006.

Lynch signed a one-year contract with the Cardinals on April 4, 2006. However, he was cut before the beginning of the season, on September 2, 2006.
