= Fred Jones (linebacker, born 1977) =

American football player (born 1977)

No. 99, 55, 53
- Position: Linebacker

Personal information
- Born: October 18, 1977 (age 49); Subic Bay, Philippines
- Listed height: 6 ft 2 in (1.88 m)
- Listed weight: 247 lb (112 kg)

Career information
- High school: St. Augustine (San Diego, California, U.S.)
- College: Colorado (1996–1999)
- NFL draft: 2000: undrafted

Career history
- Buffalo Bills (2000–2001); Frankfurt Galaxy (2003); Kansas City Chiefs (2003–2004)

Awards and highlights
- World Bowl champion (2003)

Career NFL statistics
- Tackles: 56
- Sacks: 1.5
- Tackles for loss: 1
- Stats at Pro Football Reference

Fred Allen Jones Jr. (born October 18, 1977) is an American former professional football player who was a linebacker for four seasons in the National Football League (NFL) with the Buffalo Bills and Kansas City Chiefs. He played college football for the Colorado Buffaloes. He was also a member of the Frankfurt Galaxy of NFL Europe. Jones is one of the few NFL players born in the Philippines.

== Early life and college ==
Fred Allen Jones Jr. was born on October 18, 1977, in Subic Bay, Philippines. He attended St. Augustine High School in San Diego, California.

He was a member of the Colorado Buffaloes football team from 1996 to 1999 and a letterman in 1996, 1998, and 1999.

== Professional career ==
After going undrafted in the 2000 NFL draft, Jones signed with the Buffalo Bills on April 23, 2000. He played in 15 games during his rookie season in 2000, recording 13 solo tackles, three assisted tackles, and one sack. He appeared in all 16 games during the 2001 season, totaling 14 solo tackles, one assisted tackle, and 0.5 sacks. Jones became a free agent after the 2001 season and re-signed with the Bills on May 31, 2002. He was later released on September 3, 2002.

Jones played in all ten games, starting nine, for the Frankfurt Galaxy of NFL Europe during the 2004 NFL Europe season, recording 51 defensive tackles, two special teams tackles, two pass breakups, and one forced fumble. On June 14, 2003, the Galaxy won World Bowl XI against the Rhein Fire.

Jones signed with the Kansas City Chiefs on June 19, 2003. He played in 11 games for the Chiefs in 2003, accumulating 11 solo tackles and one assisted tackle. He also appeared in one playoff game that season. Jones played in all 16 games for the Chiefs during the 2004 season, recording 12 solo tackles and one assisted tackle. He became a free agent after the 2004 season.

== NFL career statistics ==
Legend
**Bold**	Career high

=== Regular season ===
Year	Team	Games		Tackles					Interceptions					Fumbles			
Year	Team	GP	GS	Cmb	Solo	Ast	Sck	TFL	Int	Yds	TD	Lng	PD	FF	FR	Yds	TD
2000	BUF	15	0	**16**	13	**3**	**1.0**	**1**	0	0	0	0	0	0	0	0	0
2001	BUF	**16**	0	15	**14**	1	0.5	0	0	0	0	0	0	0	0	0	0
2003	KC	11	0	12	11	1	0.0	0	0	0	0	0	0	0	0	0	0
2004	KC	**16**	0	13	12	1	0.0	0	0	0	0	0	0	0	0	0	0
		58	0	56	50	6	1.5	1	0	0	0	0	0	0	0	0	0
