= Jim Jones (offensive guard) =

American football player (born 1978)

No. 74
- Position: Offensive guard

Personal information
- Born: January 27, 1978 (age 48); Chicago, Illinois, U.S.
- Listed height: 6 ft 3 in (1.91 m)
- Listed weight: 319 lb (145 kg)

Career information
- College: Notre Dame
- NFL draft: 2001: undrafted

Career history
- Baltimore Ravens (2001)*; Houston Texans (2002)*; Baltimore Ravens (2002–2003)*; Rhein Fire (2003); Pittsburgh Steelers (2004–2005); San Francisco 49ers (2005)*; Washington Redskins (2005–2006)*
- * Offseason or practice squad member only

Jim Jones (born January 27, 1978) is an American former football offensive guard who played two seasons for the Pittsburgh Steelers of the National Football League (NFL). He played college football at University of Notre Dame.

== Professional career ==
=== Baltimore Ravens ===
Jones was signed by the Baltimore Ravens on April 28, 2001, after going undrafted in the 2001 NFL draft. He was released by the Ravens on September 1, 2001.

=== Houston Texans ===
Jones signed with the Houston Texans on January 8, 2002. He was released by the Texans on April 23, 2002.

=== Baltimore Ravens/Rhein Fire ===
Jones was signed by the Baltimore Ravens on July 24, 2002. He released by the Ravens on August 30, 2002, and signed to the team's practice squad on October 17, 2002. He was released by the Ravens on November 19, 2002, and signed to the team's practice squad on November 27, 2002. Jones was allocated to NFL Europe on February 6, 2003, and played for the Rhein Fire during the 2003 season. He was released by the Ravens on August 31, 2003.

=== Pittsburgh Steelers ===
Jones signed with the Pittsburgh Steelers on January 14, 2004. He was released by the Steelers on September 3, 2005, and signed to the team's practice squad on September 5, 2005. He was released by the Steelers on October 19, 2005.

=== San Francisco 49ers ===
Jones was signed to the San Francisco 49ers' practice squad on November 22, 2005. He was released on December 14, 2005.

=== Washington Redskins ===
Jones was signed to the Washington Redskins' practice squad on December 20, 2005. He was released by the Redskins on August 28, 2006.
