= Daryon Brutley =

American football player (born 1979)

No. 31
- Position: Defensive back

Personal information
- Born: May 31, 1979 (age 47); Eufaula, Alabama, U.S.
- Listed height: 6 ft 0 in (1.83 m)
- Listed weight: 195 lb (88 kg)

Career information
- High school: Eufaula
- College: Northern Iowa
- NFL draft: 2002: undrafted

Career history
- Buffalo Bills (2002)*; Philadelphia Eagles (2003); Berlin Thunder (2003); Carolina Cobras (2004); Ohio Valley Greyhounds (2005); South Georgia Wildcats (2007); Tampa Bay Storm (2008); River City Rage (2009); Tampa Bay Storm (2010); Louisiana VooDoo (2011)
- * Offseason or practice squad member only

Career NFL statistics
- Total tackles: 1
- Stats at Pro Football Reference
- Stats at ArenaFan.com

Daryon Marquee Brutley (born May 31, 1979) is an American former professional football player who was a defensive back in the National Football League (NFL). He briefly played for the Philadelphia Eagles in 2003. Brutley played college football for the Southern Miss Golden Eagles and Northern Iowa.

Brutley is currently the Vice President of sales for Revera Marketing's mobile application Snook.
