= Shaun Hill =

American football player (born 1980)

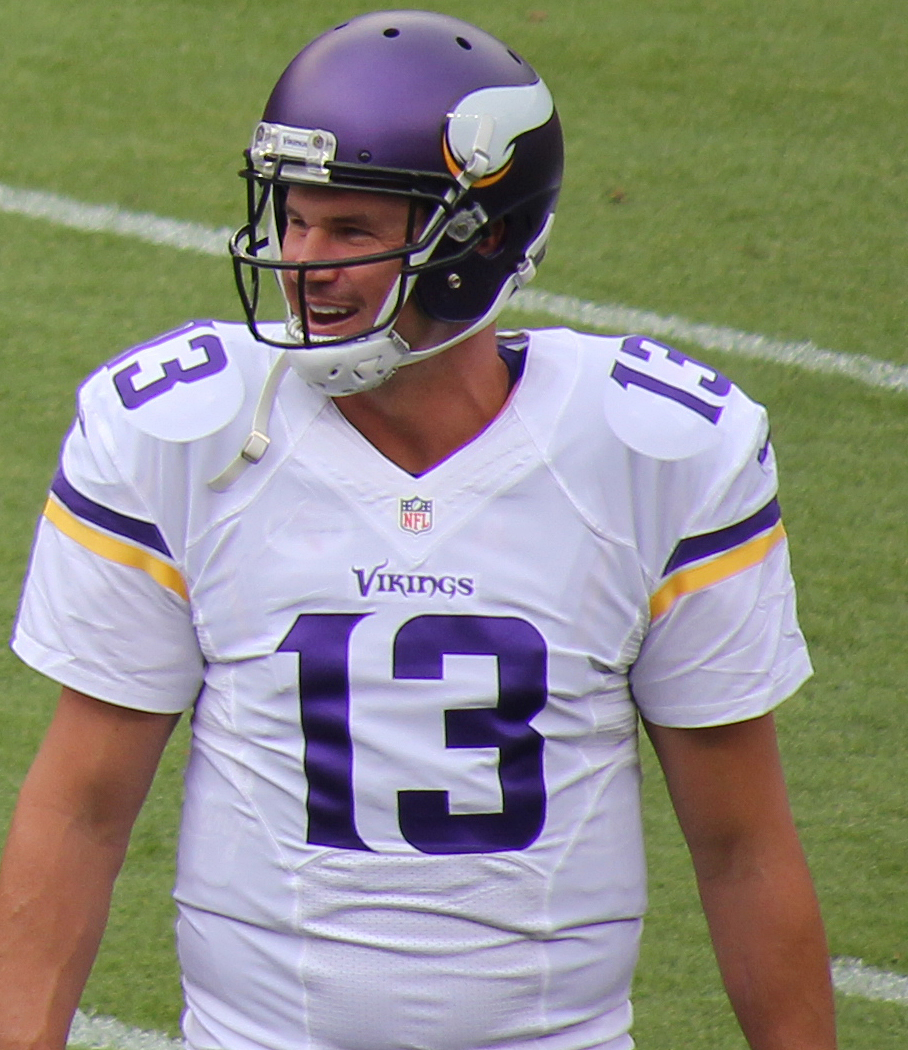
- Hill with the Minnesota Vikings in 2015

No. 13, 14
- Position: Quarterback

Personal information
- Born: January 9, 1980 (age 46); Parsons, Kansas, U.S.
- Listed height: 6 ft 3 in (1.91 m)
- Listed weight: 230 lb (104 kg)

Career information
- High school: Parsons Senior
- College: Hutchinson CC (1998–1999); Maryland (2000–2001)
- NFL draft: 2002: undrafted

Career history
- Minnesota Vikings (2002–2005); → Amsterdam Admirals (2003); San Francisco 49ers (2006–2009); Detroit Lions (2010–2013); St. Louis Rams (2014); Minnesota Vikings (2015–2016)

Awards and highlights
- NFL Europe passing yards leader (2003); Second-team All-ACC (2001); NFL Europe record: Most completions thrown in a single season (220)

Career NFL statistics
- Passing attempts: 1,225
- Passing completions: 757
- Completion percentage: 61.8%
- TD–INT: 49–30
- Passing yards: 8,295
- Passer rating: 84.9
- Stats at Pro Football Reference

Shaun Christopher Hill (born January 9, 1980) is an American former professional football player who was a quarterback for 15 seasons in the National Football League (NFL). He played college football for the Maryland Terrapins. Hill was signed by the Minnesota Vikings as an undrafted free agent in 2002. He also played for the Amsterdam Admirals, San Francisco 49ers, Detroit Lions, and St. Louis Rams.

== Early life ==
Hill attended Parsons Senior High School in Parsons, Kansas, where he was a three-year starter at quarterback and 2-year starter at free safety on the high school football team. He was a two-time All-Southeast Kansas League 1st-team selection and an honorable mention All-State as a senior.

In addition to football, Hill also lettered in basketball, track and baseball. As a team captain in hoops, he was a three-time All-SEK 1st-team choice and earned All-State honors 3 consecutive years while guiding Parsons to the state tournament as a sophomore and senior. He played all five positions at times for the small school program, and set career marks for assists, steals, blocks, and 3-point field goals. In track & field, he ran sprints (100m, 200m, 4 × 100 m, 4 × 400 m) as a junior and senior and even qualified for the state championships in three events during his final year. He played as a shortstop and pitcher in baseball, and was a second team All-conference pick as a sophomore.

== College career ==
Hill was not highly recruited out of high school. Nearby Pittsburg State University offered him a scholarship as a punter, not a quarterback. Because of this, Hill elected to spend two years at Hutchinson Community College. While there, Hill beat out five players to start at QB for both years, earning honorable mention All-American honors as a freshman and sophomore. His junior college success garnered him Division I attention, and he eventually decided to attend college at University of Maryland. While serving primarily as a backup as a junior, he led the Maryland Terrapins to their first Atlantic Coast Conference title since 1985 as a senior in 2001. They earned a trip to the 2002 Orange Bowl and finished the year ranked #10 in the country. He finished his Maryland career with 3,158 yards and 19 touchdowns.

== Professional career ==
Pre-draft measurables
Height	Weight
6 ft 3 1/8 in (1.91 m)	223 lb (101 kg)
All values from Pro Day

=== Minnesota Vikings (first stint) ===
Hill was not considered an NFL prospect, was not invited to the 2002 NFL Scouting Combine, and, went undrafted in the 2002 NFL draft. He ended up signing as a free agent with the Minnesota Vikings, where he spent the season as a 3rd-string backup. He took his first career snaps for the Vikings on the final two plays of the 2005 NFL season, taking a knee both times.

=== Amsterdam Admirals ===
In order to get more experience, Hill spent the spring of 2003 with the Amsterdam Admirals of NFL Europe, where he led the league in passing yards and tied for second in touchdowns.

=== San Francisco 49ers ===
Hill entered the 2006 NFL preseason third on the San Francisco 49ers depth chart, behind Trent Dilfer and Alex Smith. He went 15/23 (65.2%) for 162 yards, no touchdowns and one interception. He spent the 2006 regular season on the sidelines, taking no snaps.

Hill completed 13 of 20 passes for 148 yards with one interception in the San Francisco 49ers' 17–13 preseason opening loss to the Denver Broncos on August 16, 2007. He demonstrated great pocket mobility but had difficulty in the red zone, throwing one interception in his first drive and then nearly throwing an interception at almost exactly the same place the second time down the field. In the last game of the 2007 preseason against the San Diego Chargers, Hill attempted to put the 49ers in field goal range to tie the game. With 16 seconds left on the clock, he threw two deep balls to his wide receivers but both missed their targets, and the second was intercepted, ending the game with the Chargers ahead, 16–13.

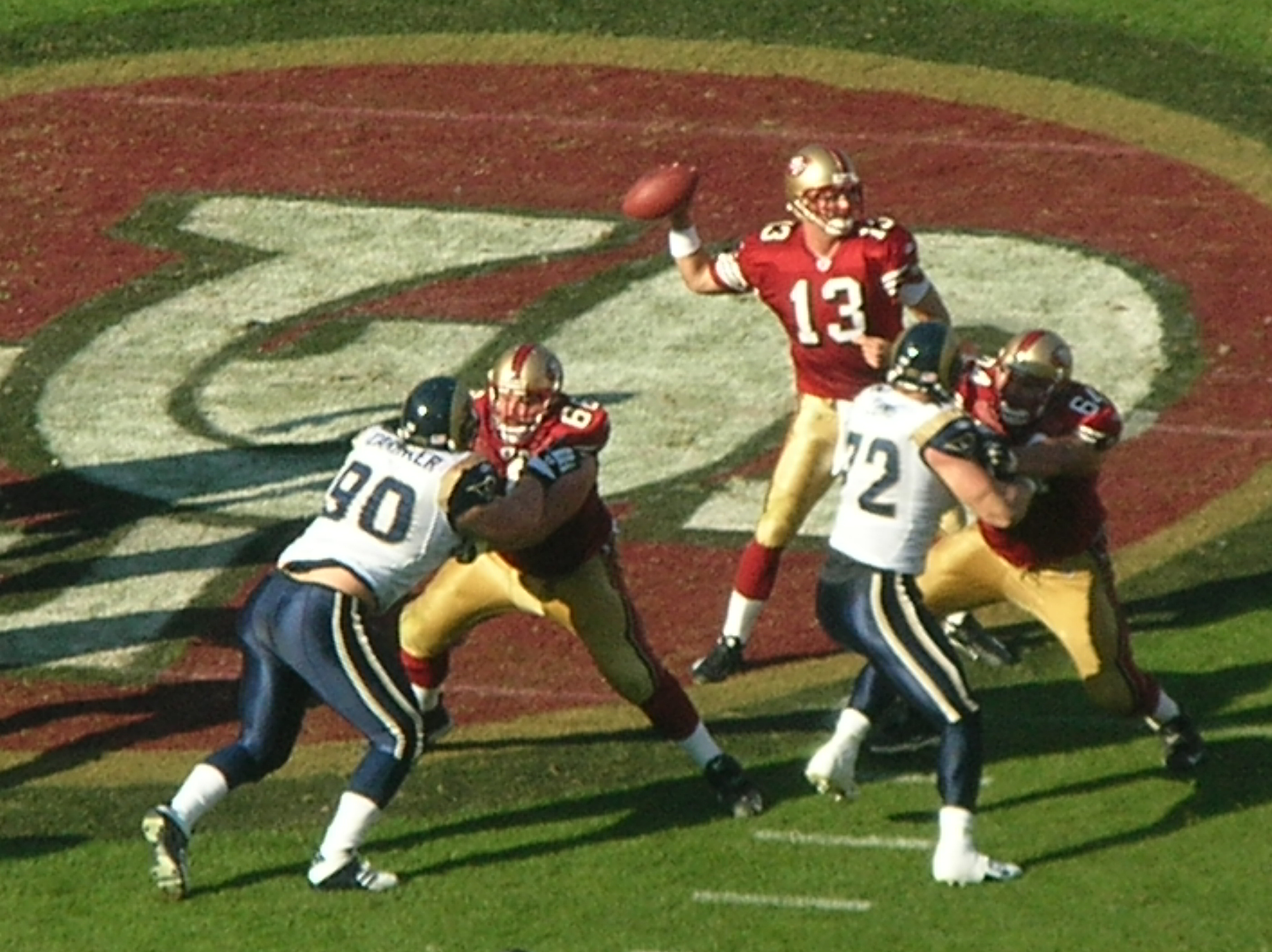
Hill passes against the Rams on November 16, 2008

Hill made his 49ers regular-season debut on December 9, 2007, after Trent Dilfer suffered a severe concussion. He completed 22 of 27 pass attempts for 181 yards and one touchdown in a loss to his former team, the Minnesota Vikings. Hill was critical of his performance, adding, "There [are] a lot of things I need to get better at. Some of that is about getting comfortable playing again. Some things made me want to throw up. Some things, the execution was poor but the results were good on my part. Some things I got away with. The results were better than my execution."

Since Dilfer's injury was serious enough to sideline him for the rest of the season, Hill made his first NFL start on December 15, 2007, in a victory against the Cincinnati Bengals. Hill completed 21 of 28 pass attempts for 197 yards, ran for a touchdown and threw a touchdown. Hill was set to be the starter for the remainder of the 2007 season.

On December 18, 2007, the 49ers announced that they had an interest in re-signing Hill, to provide competition against Alex Smith. However, the contract extension, along with its negotiations, were dependent on Hill's performance for the rest of the season. On December 23, 2007, Hill made his second career start, against the Tampa Bay Buccaneers. He completed 11 of 24 pass attempts for 123 yards and three touchdown passes, to Darrell Jackson, fellow former Terrapin Vernon Davis, and Frank Gore. The 49ers won 21–19.

Hill suffered a back injury during the week 16 game against the Tampa Bay Buccaneers, when rookie Gaines Adams hit him after a throw, drawing a 15-yard personal foul. As a result, Hill was unable to play in week 17 against the Cleveland Browns. Chris Weinke played in his place.

In February 2008, Hill signed a new 3-year contract with the 49ers, with contractual terms not released to the media. The undrafted Hill competed for the starting job against Alex Smith and J. T. O'Sullivan in training camp and the 2008 preseason. O'Sullivan ended up getting the job and Hill became the primary backup after Smith was put on injured reserve early in the season.

Hill did not play until 49ers interim head coach Mike Singletary took over on October 27. After J. T. O'Sullivan committed his second turnover against the Seattle Seahawks that was returned for a touchdown, he was pulled from the lineup and Hill replaced him with solid output: 15 of 23 for 173 yards with one touchdown to Jason Hill and no turnovers, but he could not rescue the 49ers, who lost 34–13.

Despite the loss, Hill was named as Singletary's no. 1 QB for the remainder of the 2008 season. His 2008 starting debut was in week 10, on Monday Night Football against the Arizona Cardinals.

Shortly after the Seahawks game, reports surfaced that Nolan and offensive coordinator Mike Martz allegedly made up stories about Hill having a tired arm in the preseason so that O'Sullivan, who played for Martz when he was offensive coordinator of the Detroit Lions, would win the starting job without a real challenge.

On Monday Night Football against the heavily favored Arizona Cardinals, Hill delivered a solid performance in the first half. Hill completed a 31-yard touchdown to Josh Morgan to put the 49ers up 14–3, and then struck later with a 20-yard touchdown to Vernon Davis shortly before half-time. However, in the second half, Hill threw an interception at a critically bad time to give the Cardinals the 24–29 lead. Hill also threw a second interception on an attempted shovel pass at the Arizona 20-yard line. Despite this, Hill drove the 49ers down the field twice, the first with 3:39, and the second with only 1:04 left on the game clock. Hill's last pass of the game was a completion to Jason Hill to bring the 49ers to the Arizona goal line. Unfortunately, the 49ers were unable to score the game-winning touchdown. Coincidentally, on Monday Night Football of the 2007 season against the Cardinals, the 49ers drove to the goal line in a similar fashion, and were able to get the game-winning touchdown.

During week 11 of the 2008 NFL season, Hill broke his career single-game passing record in yards, in a 35–16 victory over the St. Louis Rams by throwing for 213 yards and 2 touchdowns and running for a third. He was awarded NFC Offensive Player of the Week for his performance.

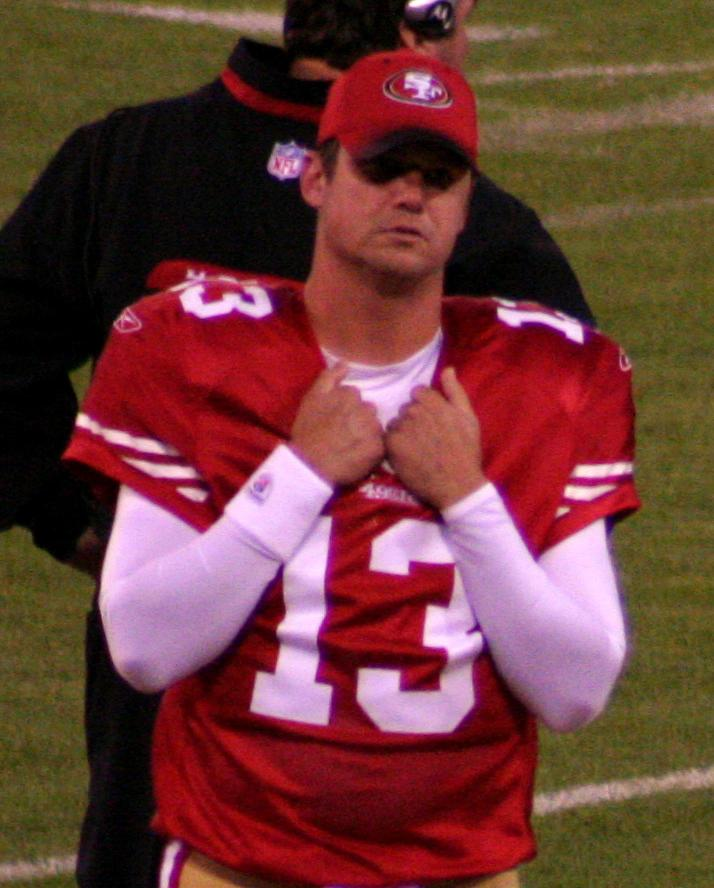
Hill with the 49ers in 2009

In week 12, Hill got his first 300-yard passing game in a loss to the Dallas Cowboys.

Hill delivered an impressive come-back performance in Week 16 against the St. Louis Rams. After throwing three interceptions in the first three quarters, 49ers coaches Mike Singletary and Mike Martz were preparing to bench Hill for J. T. O'Sullivan. Hill convinced his coach to leave him in the game and then led the 49ers on an 80-yard drive, finishing with a touchdown pass to Isaac Bruce for his 1000th career reception. Now down 16–10 and under three minutes left on the clock, Hill got the ball back and completed a 48-yard touchdown pass to Josh Morgan. The 49ers defense intercepted Marc Bulger ending any chance of a Rams comeback and capping Hill's first big late-game rally win.

In a week 17 thriller against the Washington Redskins, Hill was showing difficulty, throwing an interception in the first half and no touchdowns. However, in the fourth quarter, Hill took the lead by completing a 9-yard touchdown pass to Jason Hill. Later, with the game tied at 24–24, Hill drove down the field with one minute left on the game clock to set up a game-winning Joe Nedney field goal.

With the victory, Hill improved to a 5–3 record on the season, and a 7–3 record as a starter all time. He finished the season with 13 passing touchdowns, 2 rushing touchdowns, 8 interceptions, 2,046 passing yards, and an 87.5 quarterback rating in 9 games (8 as a starter).

49ers head coach Mike Singletary had stated that Hill would be the starting quarterback going into training camp in 2009 but would compete with former number-one overall draft pick Alex Smith for the regular season starting job.

Hill was named the starter for the 49ers preseason opener versus the Denver Broncos, where he would throw only two passes, completing both.

On August 25, Hill was named the 49ers' starting quarterback for the regular season, defending his starting title over Smith.

Hill made his season-opening debut on September 13 against the Arizona Cardinals. Hill made a fourth-quarter touchdown pass to Frank Gore to win the game 20–16. With the win, Hill improved to 8–3 as a starter.

The following week against the Seattle Seahawks, Hill completed 19 of 26 passes for 144 yards and also ran once for 17 yards. The 49ers won 23–10, and Hill would continue his undefeated streak of six home victories. After a 35–0 drubbing of St. Louis, he extended it to 7–0.

Arguably, one of Hill's best games came in week 3 on the road against the undefeated Minnesota Vikings. Hill was 15/25, for 195 yards, with two touchdowns, and one interception in the game. Hill led the 49ers to a lead near the end of the game, but Brett Favre ultimately threw a 30-yard touchdown pass with two seconds left to win for the Vikings.

After a scoreless first half in the game against the Houston Texans in week 7, Singletary benched Hill and put Alex Smith into the game. Smith rallied the 49ers with three touchdowns to bring the score from 0–21 to 21–24. Although the 49ers lost the game, the comeback earned Smith the starting quarterback position in the next game against the Indianapolis Colts on November 1. Hill served as Smith's backup for the rest of the season.

=== Detroit Lions ===
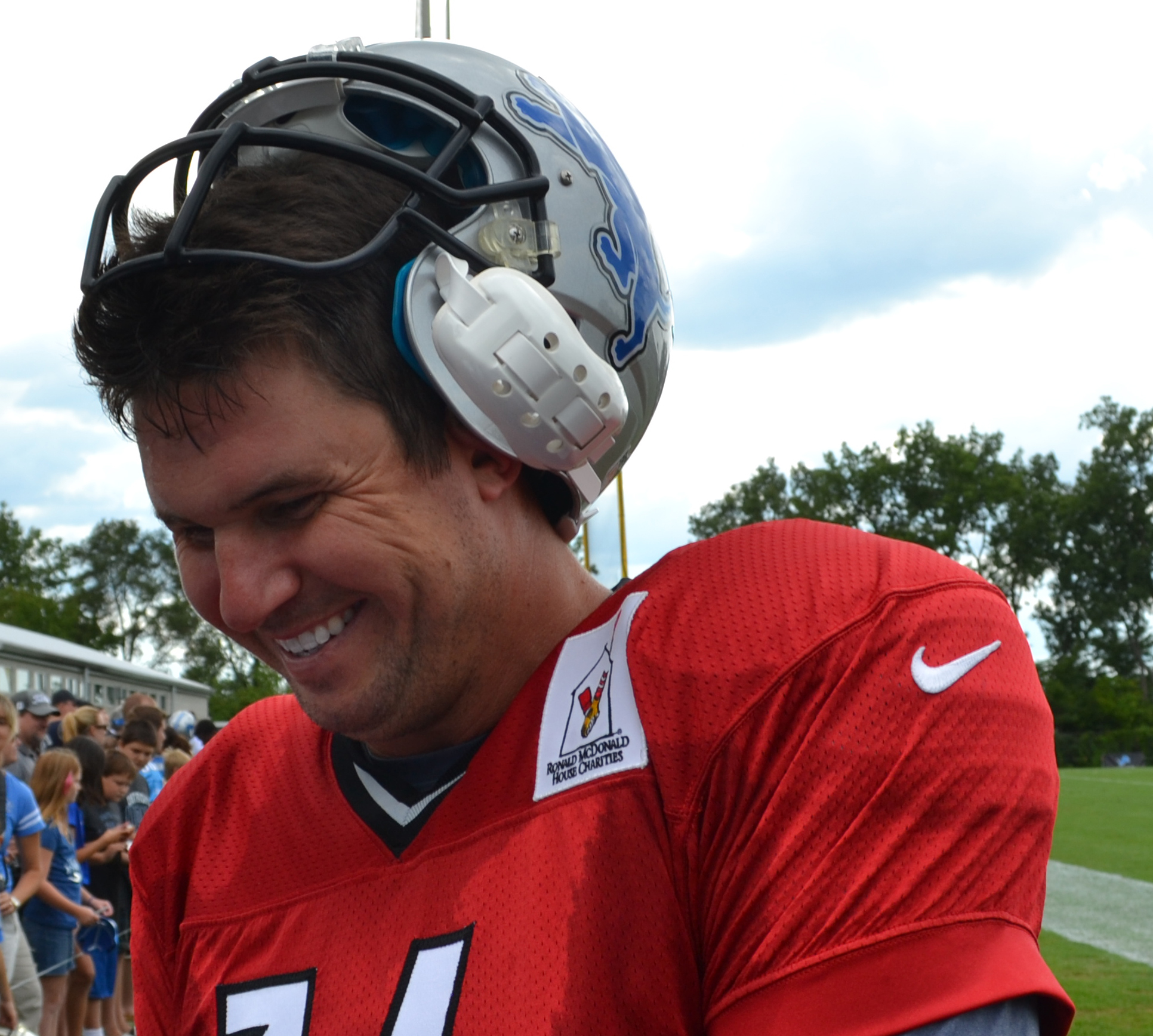
Shaun Hill at the 2012 Lions training camp

Hill was traded to the Detroit Lions in exchange for a seventh round draft pick in 2011 on March 14, 2010. The Lions signed him to a one-year contract on July 12, 2010. He entered the Lions first game of the 2010 season when starter Matthew Stafford was injured. Hill threw 9 completions on 19 attempts with 88 yards and one interception leading Detroit to within the 30-yard line with under 30 seconds to go. Hill threw what seemed to be the game-winning touchdown but was later ruled incomplete by a technicality in the NFL rule book, which is now being referred to as the "Calvin Johnson Rule". He was injured while filling in for the injured Matthew Stafford October 17, 2010, against the New York Giants. The Lions announced that he had suffered a fracture of his left (non-throwing) forearm. Hill capped the season with victories against the Miami Dolphins and Minnesota Vikings, and the Lions finished 6–10.

He was considered to be one of the better backup quarterbacks in the NFL, performing well during his appearances.

=== St. Louis Rams ===
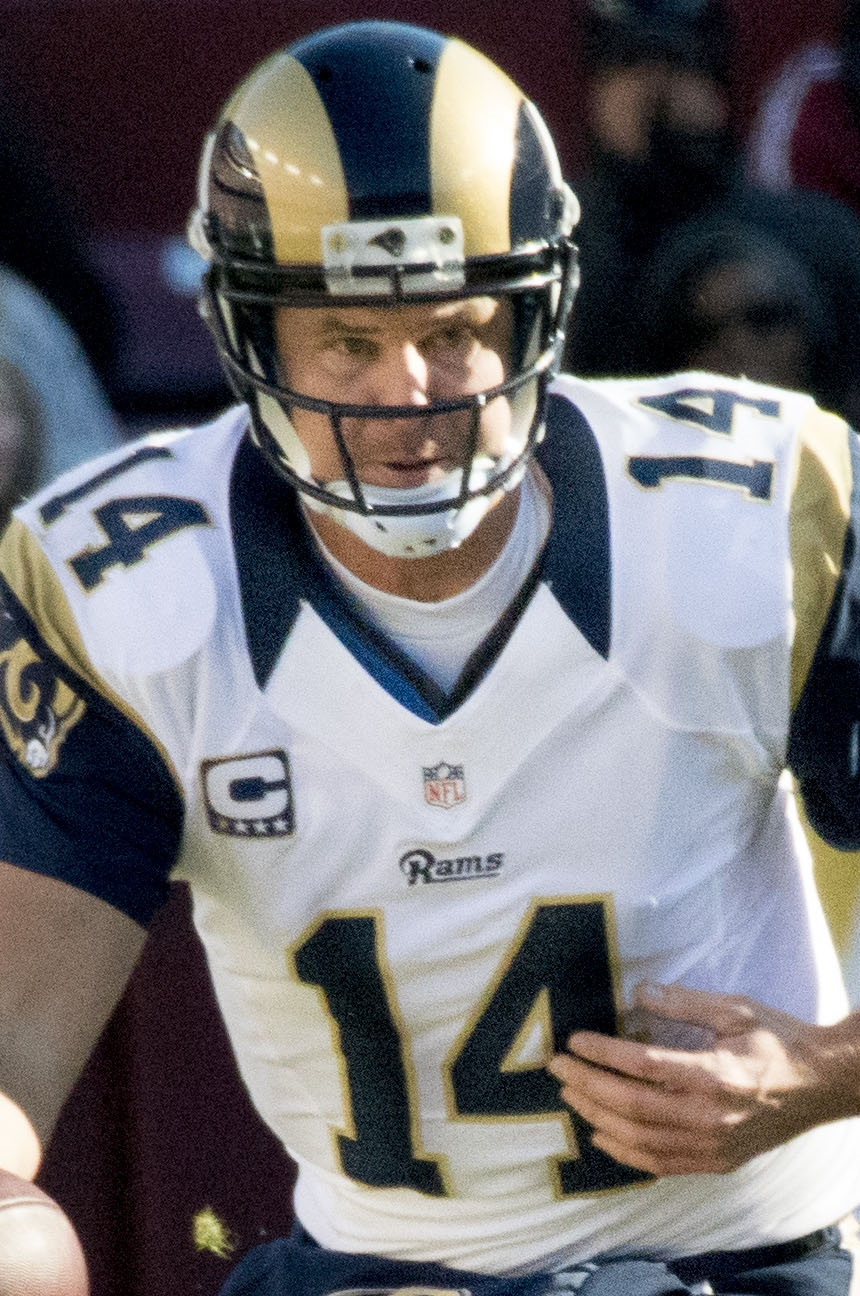
Hill with the Rams in 2014

He signed a one-year deal with the St. Louis Rams on March 26, 2014. Following a season-ending ACL injury to starter Sam Bradford in a preseason game on August 23, 2014, Hill was named the new starter by coach Jeff Fisher. However, in Week 2, Hill was replaced by Austin Davis to be the starter. After a bad performance against the Arizona Cardinals in late November, Davis was benched again in favor of Hill. Hill finished the 2014 season with 1,657 passing yards, 8 touchdowns, 7 interceptions, and an 83.9 quarterback rating in 9 games with 8 starts.

=== Minnesota Vikings (second stint) ===
On March 10, 2015, Hill signed with the Vikings. In Week 9 against the St. Louis Rams, Teddy Bridgewater left the game in the second half with a concussion. Hill took over for the rest of the game, which the Vikings won 21–18 in overtime.

After Bridgewater was placed on injured reserve during the 2016 offseason, Hill was selected to start Week 1 of the 2016 season over Sam Bradford, who the Vikings traded for after Bridgewater's injury. Hill completed 18 of 33 passes for 236 yards with no touchdowns or interceptions in the 25–16 win against the Tennessee Titans.

== Career statistics ==
=== NFL ===
Year	Team	Games			Passing								Rushing				Sacks		Fumbles (Note: Fumbles lost data taken from Pro Football Reference career game log)	
Year	Team	GP	GS	Record	Cmp	Att	Pct	Yds	Y/A	TD	Int	Rtg	Att	Yds	Avg	TD	Sck	SckY	Fum	Lost
2005	MIN	1	0	0–0	0	0	0.0	0	0.0	0	0	0.0	2	−2	−1.0	0	0	0	0	0
2006	SF	0	0	DNP																
2007	SF	3	2	2–0	54	79	68.4	501	6.3	5	1	101.3	12	14	1.2	1	6	31	3	0
2008	SF	9	8	5–3	181	288	62.8	2,046	7.1	13	8	87.5	24	115	4.8	2	23	148	8	2
2009	SF	6	6	3–3	87	155	56.1	943	6.1	5	2	79.6	8	70	8.8	0	18	107	3	1
2010	DET	11	10	3–7	257	416	61.8	2,686	6.5	16	12	81.3	22	123	5.6	0	17	113	3	1
2011	DET	2	0	0–0	2	3	66.7	33	11.0	0	0	103.5	1	−1	−1.0	0	0	0	0	0
2012	DET	1	0	0–0	10	13	76.9	172	13.2	2	0	157.9	1	−1	−1.0	0	0	0	0	0
2013	DET	1	0	0–0	0	0	0.0	0	0.0	0	0	0.0	2	−2	−1.0	0	0	0	0	0
2014	STL	9	8	3–5	145	229	63.3	1,657	7.2	8	7	83.9	10	10	1.0	1	18	116	7	1
2015	MIN	3	0	0–0	2	7	28.6	15	2.1	0	0	39.6	4	−5	−1.3	0	1	11	0	0
2016	MIN	3	1	1–0	19	35	54.3	242	6.9	0	0	76.1	5	5	1.0	0	1	7	0	0
Career		49	35	17–18	757	1,225	61.8	8,295	6.8	49	30	84.9	91	326	3.6	4	84	533	24	5

=== College ===
Season	Team	Passing								Rushing			
Season	Team	Cmp	Att	Pct	Yds	Y/A	TD	Int	Rtg	Att	Yds	Avg	TD
2000	Maryland	73	126	57.9	778	6.2	6	4	119.2	44	92	2.1	1
2001	Maryland	197	329	59.9	2,380	7.2	13	9	128.2	116	309	2.7	7
Career		270	455	59.3	3,158	6.9	19	13	125.7	160	401	2.5	8

== Career highlights ==
- NFL Europe passing yards leader (2003)
- NFL Europe record; most completions thrown in a single season (220)
- FedEx Air Player of the Week – Week 5, 2010
- Second-team All-ACC (2001)

== Personal life ==
Hill was a kinesiology major at Maryland. He participated in several Viking Children's Fund events and has supported the Muscular Dystrophy Association. He joined former Vikings Head Coach Mike Tice as a former Terrapin quarterback and was teammates at Maryland with former Vikings linebacker E.J. Henderson. Hill kept a weekly journal chronicling his adventures in Europe for fans on his former team's website, Vikings.com.
