= Matt Stanley (American football) =

American football player (born 1979)

No. 44
- Position: Fullback

Personal information
- Born: April 27, 1979 (age 47); Pasadena, California, U.S.
- Listed height: 6 ft 3 in (1.91 m)
- Listed weight: 245 lb (111 kg)

Career information
- High school: Bexley (Bexley, Ohio)
- College: UCLA (1997–2001)
- NFL draft: 2002: undrafted

Career history
- San Francisco 49ers (2002–2004); → Rhein Fire (2003)

Career NFL statistics
- Games played: 1
- Stats at Pro Football Reference

Matthew Charles Stanley (born April 27, 1979) is an American former professional football fullback who played in the National Football League (NFL) for the San Francisco 49ers. He played college football for the UCLA Bruins. Stanley was also a member of the Rhein Fire of NFL Europe

== Early life ==
Stanley was born on April 27, 1979, in Pasadena, California. He attended Bexley High School in Bexley, Ohio. Stanley rushed for 1,460 yards and scored 25 touchdowns as a senior. In 1996, he was named to the second-team All-State team. Stanley also lettered in basketball and track.

== College career ==
Stanley played college football for the UCLA Bruins from 1997 to 2001. He had 124 rushing yards and one rushing touchdown with 12 catches for 163 yards and one receiving touchdown.

== Professional career ==
=== San Francisco 49ers ===
After going undrafted in the 2002 NFL draft, Stanley signed with the San Francisco 49ers as an undrafted free agent. On August 13, 2002, he was released. On January 29, 2003, Stanley was signed by the 49ers. On September 1, he was waived by the team. On April 13, 2004, Stanley signed with the 49ers. On September 5, he was released and signed to the practice squad. On September 11, Stanley was signed to the active roster and played in one game before he was released on September 14. The following day he was signed to the practice squad and then waived on September 23.

=== Rhein Fire ===
On February 4, 2003, Stanley was allocated to the Rhein Fire of NFL Europe. In 10 games, he had 87 rushing yards, six receptions for 50 yards and 11 tackles.
