= Deveron Harper =

American football player (born 1977)

No. 10, 28
- Position: Defensive back

Personal information
- Born: November 15, 1977 (age 48); Orangeburg, South Carolina, U.S.
- Listed height: 5 ft 11 in (1.80 m)
- Listed weight: 187 lb (85 kg)

Career information
- High school: Orangeburg (SC) Wilkinson
- College: Notre Dame
- NFL draft: 2000: undrafted

Career history
- Carolina Panthers (2000–2001); New Orleans Saints (2003–2004); Scottish Claymores (2003); Miami Dolphins (2005)*; Austin Wranglers (2006–2007); Kansas City Brigade (2007)
- * Offseason or practice squad member only
- Stats at Pro Football Reference
- Stats at ArenaFan.com

Deveron Alfredo Harper (born November 15, 1977) is an American former professional football defensive back who played four seasons in the National Football League (NFL) with the Carolina Panthers and New Orleans Saints. Harper played college football at the University of Notre Dame. He was also a member of the Scottish Claymores, Miami Dolphins, Austin Wranglers and Kansas City Brigade.

== Early life ==
Harper attended Orangeburg-Wilkinson Senior High School in Orangeburg, South Carolina.

== Professional career ==
Harper played in 24 games for the NFL's Carolina Panthers from 2000 to 2001. He was waived/injured by the Panthers on August 1, 2002. He played in 19 games for the New Orleans Saints of the NFL from 2003 to 2004. Harper was released by the Saints on October 12, 2004. He was signed by the Miami Dolphins of the NFL on August 10, 2005. He was released by the Dolphins on August 15, 2005. Harper signed with the Austin Wranglers of the Arena Football League (AFL) on October 18, 2005. He played for the AFL's Kansas City Brigade in 2007. He is now working as a Defensive Back coach at Campbell University.
