= Quinn Gray =

American football player (born 1979)

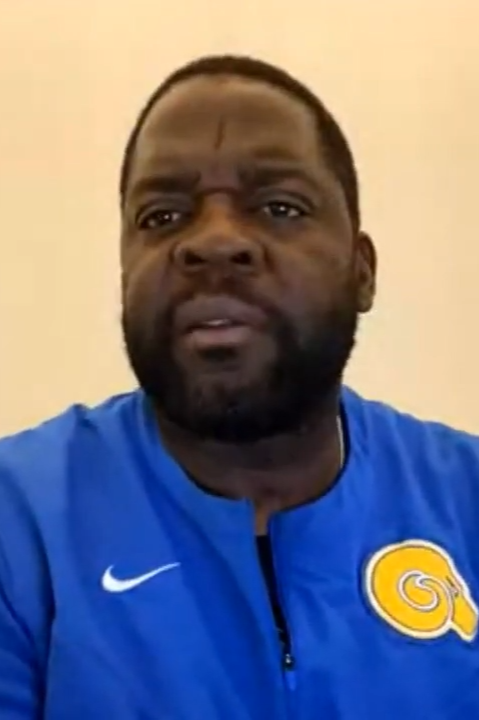
- Gray in 2023

Florida A&M Rattlers
- Title: Head coach

Personal information
- Born: May 21, 1979 (age 47); Fort Lauderdale, Florida, U.S.
- Listed height: 6 ft 2 in (1.88 m)
- Listed weight: 240 lb (109 kg)

Career information
- Position: Quarterback (No. 5, 8)
- High school: Dillard (Fort Lauderdale)
- College: Florida A&M
- NFL draft: 2002: undrafted

Career history

Playing
- Jacksonville Jaguars (2002–2007); → Frankfurt Galaxy (2003); Houston Texans (2008)*; Indianapolis Colts (2008)*; Kansas City Chiefs (2008); New York Sentinels (2009)
- * Offseason or practice squad member only

Coaching
- Lincoln HS (FL) (2017–2019) Head coach; Alcorn State (2020–2022) Quarterbacks coach; Albany State (2023–2025) Head coach; Florida A&M (2026–present) Head coach

Awards and highlights
- World Bowl champion (XI)

Career NFL statistics
- Passing attempts: 188
- Passing completions: 108
- Completion percentage: 57.4%
- TD–INT: 13–5
- Passing yards: 1,328
- Passer rating: 91.4
- Stats at Pro Football Reference

Head coaching record
- Regular season: 23–14 (.622)
- Postseason: 2–1 (.667)
- Career: 25–15 (.625)

Quinn Fordham Gray Sr. (born May 21, 1979) is an American college football coach and former player. He is the head football coach for Florida A&M University, a position he has held since 2025. Gray played professionally as a quarterback four seasons in the National Football League (NFL) and one season each in the United Football League (UFL) and NFL Europe. He played college football at Florida A&M University.

Gray was signed by the Jacksonville Jaguars as an undrafted free agent in 2002. He played for the Frankfurt Galaxy in 2003 and the Jaguars from 2005 to 2007. During the 2008 off-season, Gray signed with both the Houston Texans and Indianapolis Colts before joining the Kansas City Chiefs for the 2008 season. He ended his professional football career playing for the New York Sentinels of the UFL in 2009.

== Early life ==
Gray attended Dillard High School in Fort Lauderdale, Florida, and was a letterman. He was a star in football as a quarterback, in baseball as a pitcher, and in basketball. In football, he won All-Region and All-District honors.

== College career ==
Gray decided to attend Florida A&M University and set several FAMU records as a football player, including all-time leader in passing yards (7,378), all-time leader in pass attempts (1,113), all-time leader in pass completions (562) and all-time leader in TD passes (57). He also holds the school's single-game record for most pass attempts (65 vs. North Carolina A&T in 2001).

== Professional career ==
=== Jacksonville Jaguars ===
In 2002, Gray attended training camp with the Jacksonville Jaguars, appearing in three preseason games, completing 5 of 8 passes for 55 yards and one interception. In 2003, he was allocated to NFL Europe, where he led the Frankfurt Galaxy to a win in World Bowl XI.

He attended the Jaguars training camp the next year, winning the 3rd quarterback position. He first saw action in a regular season game with the season finale against the Tennessee Titans in the 2005 season, completing 14 passes for 100 yards, 2 touchdowns, and no interceptions for a passer rating of 119.0. He again saw action in the 2006 season finale versus the Kansas City Chiefs, entering the game to replace David Garrard in the third quarter. Down 28–10, he nearly led the Jaguars to a comeback, completing 13 of 22 passes 166 yards, with no interceptions, and rushing for 26 yards and 2 touchdowns.

In October 2007, he became starting quarterback of the Jaguars due to an injury to Garrard. Gray went 2–1 as the starter. He also started the last game of the season against Houston Texans, losing 42–28. Gray became an unrestricted free agent following the 2007 season.

=== Houston Texans ===
On March 24, 2008, the Houston Texans signed Gray to a one-year, $645,000 contract. He was released by the team on June 9.

=== Indianapolis Colts ===
With quarterback Peyton Manning out of the early portion of 2008 Training Camp with a knee injury, Gray signed with the Indianapolis Colts. He was released on August 30, 2008.

=== Kansas City Chiefs ===
On October 22, 2008, Gray was signed by the Kansas City Chiefs after quarterbacks Brodie Croyle and Damon Huard were placed on injured reserve. In a game against the Buffalo Bills in week 11, Gray made his only appearance of the season when he came in during the last minutes of a blowout. He completed 6 straight passes on his first drive, including a touchdown to Dwayne Bowe. On his next drive, he completed another pass and topped off his dominant performance with a 27-yard run as time expired. This would be the highlight of his career. The Chiefs released Gray on March 11, 2009.

=== New York Sentinels ===
Gray was signed by the New York Sentinels of the United Football League on August 5, 2009. He was released before the team's 2010 season began in Hartford, Connecticut.

== Coaching career ==
In 2017, Gray became head coach at Lincoln High School in Tallahassee, Florida. He left the position in 2020 to become quarterbacks coach at Alcorn State University.

On January 23, 2023, Albany State hired Gray to be their next head coach.

== Head coaching record ==
=== College ===
Year	Team	Overall	Conference	Standing	Bowl/playoffs
Albany State Golden Rams (Southern Intercollegiate Athletic Conference) (2023–2025)
2023	Albany State	6–5	6–2	T–2nd	
2024	Albany State	6–4	6–2	T–2nd	
2025	Albany State	12–2	8–0	1st	L NCAA Division II Quarterfinal
Albany State:		24–11	20–4		
Florida A&M Rattlers football (Southwestern Athletic Conference) (2026–present)
2026	Florida A&M	2–7	1–4		
Florida A&M:		2–7	1–4		
Total:		26–18			
National championship Conference title Conference division title or championship game berth

=== High school ===
Year	Team	Overall	Conference	Standing	Bowl/playoffs
Lincoln Trojans () (2017–2019)
2017	Lincoln	5–7	2–0	1st	
2018	Lincoln	7–5	2–0	1st	
2019	Lincoln	8–4	4–2	3rd	
Lincoln:		20–16	8–2		
Total:		20–16			
National championship Conference title Conference division title or championship game berth
