= Robert Baker (gridiron football) =

American gridiron football player (born 1976)

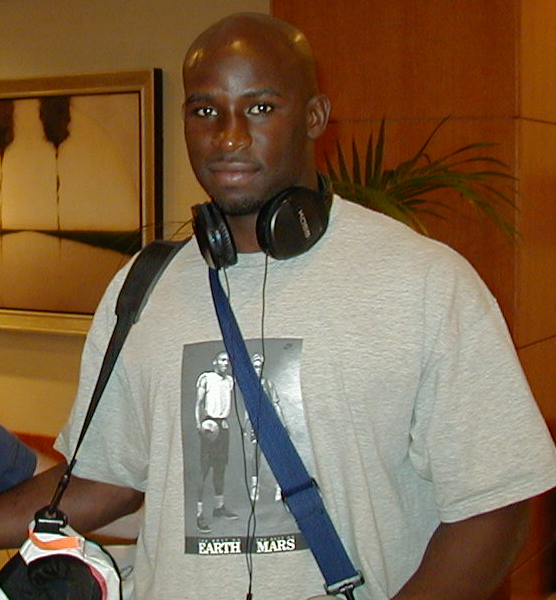
- Baker in 2003

No. 83, 88
- Position: Wide receiver

Personal information
- Born: March 14, 1976 (age 50); Gainesville, Florida, U.S.

Career information
- High school: Gainesville (FL) P. K. Yonge
- College: Auburn
- NFL draft: 1999: undrafted

Career history
- Miami Dolphins (1999–2002); Frankfurt Galaxy (2003); Minnesota Vikings (2003); Toronto Argonauts (2004–2006)

Awards and highlights
- Grey Cup champion (2004)

Career NFL statistics
- Games played: 10
- Receptions: 1
- Receiving yards: 17
- Stats at Pro Football Reference

Robert Cedrick Baker, III (born March 14, 1976) is a former professional gridiron football player, most recently with the Toronto Argonauts of the Canadian Football League from 2004 to 2006 as a slotback and wide receiver. He is the older brother of the late Dante Anderson.

== Early life ==
Baker played college football with the Auburn Tigers football team from 1995 to 1996, but was declared academically ineligible to play in 1997. His college career is most remembered by a first quarter touchdown pass he caught against Georgia in 1996. After the touchdown, Baker began celebrating near Georgia mascot, Uga V. The dog lunged at Baker, with the incident now captured in a famous picture.

In 1998, Baker began his life as a drug dealer. He was later arrested by police in Florida in an undercover drug sting, subsequently getting sentenced to 15 years in prison with a $50,000 fine. Baker spent the next five months in a Lee County, Florida jail, then transferred to the state penitentiary. Eleven months after the transfer, Baker got his early release.

== National Football League ==
Between 1999 and 2003, Baker was a member of the Miami Dolphins of the National Football League, spending equal time on the active roster, injured reserve, the practice squad or even being cut from the team before getting re-signed a year later. Baker has also played with the Frankfurt Galaxy of NFL Europe in 2003.

== Canadian Football League ==
On March 16, 2004, Baker signed with the Argonauts. In each of his first two seasons with the Argonauts, he had amassed over 1,000 receiving yards each time. Baker also won a Grey Cup championship in his first year with the team, scoring a 23-yard touchdown reception. Despite those achievements, Baker was also known for his inconsistent performances that featured either untimely dropped passes or fumbles after making his receptions. Baker also developed a reputation as an undisciplined player with a rough attitude, most notably fights with two of his teammates. In 2004, Baker and linebacker Chuck Winters got involved in two separate fights which were later resolved with a handshake. In 2005, a sideline fight between Baker and kicker Noel Prefontaine ensued on the sidelines during a game in Calgary. On August 3, 2006, coach Pinball Clemons kept Baker from entering a game in the first half against the Montreal Alouettes for disciplinary reasons. He was later released by the Argonauts on August 8, 2006. He was claimed off waivers by the Winnipeg Blue Bombers on August 11, 2006, but did not report to the team. On August 22, 2006, Baker announced his retirement from professional football to pursue a career in rap music under the recording name Shake Severs.

== Prison sentence ==
Baker was stopped for a traffic violation in Georgia on January 20, 2013. Police say they found 59.5 grams of heroin and a semi-automatic pistol in his car. He pleaded guilty in October 2013 to federal heroin trafficking and firearms charges, and he was sentenced to six years and three months in prison.
