= 2003 Amsterdam Admirals season =

NFL Europe team season

- General manager: Ronald Buys
- Head coach: Bart Andrus
- Home stadium: Amsterdam ArenA

Results
- Record: 4–6
- Division place: 5th
- Playoffs: Did not qualify

The 2003 Amsterdam Admirals season was the ninth season for the franchise in the NFL Europe League (NFLEL). The team was led by head coach Bart Andrus in his third year, and played its home games at Amsterdam ArenA in Amsterdam, Netherlands. They finished the regular season in fifth place with a record of four wins and six losses.

== Offseason ==
=== Free agent draft ===
2003 Amsterdam Admirals NFLEL free agent draft selections
| Draft order | | Player name | Position | College |
| Round | Choice | Player name | Position | College |
|---|---|---|---|---|
| 1 | 2 | Jonathan Brown | DE | Tennessee |
| 2 | 8 | Marcel Howard | T | Iowa State |
| 3 | 17 | Mawuko Tugbenyoh | LB | California |
| 4 | 20 | Damonte McKenzie | DE | Clemson |
| 5 | 29 | Kenny Jackson | LB | Nevada |
| 6 | 32 | Jordan Younger | CB | Connecticut |
| 7 | 41 | Seneca McMillan | CB | Nicholls State |
| 8 | 44 | Tony Ortiz | LB | Nebraska |
| 9 | 53 | Bennitte Waddell | T | Tuskegee |
| 10 | 56 | Ryan Collins | TE | St. Thomas |
| 11 | 65 | Rob Gatrell | G | Fresno State |
| 12 | 68 | Troy Grant | CB | Tennessee Tech |
| 13 | 77 | Carey Clayton | C | UTEP |
| 14 | 80 | Larry Austin | CB | Virginia Tech |
| 15 | 89 | Tito Simpson | DT | North Carolina |
| 16 | 92 | Damion Wright | G | Weber State |
| 17 | 101 | Pernell Griffin | LB | East Carolina |
| 18 | 104 | Dwan Epps | LB | Texas Southern |
| 19 | 113 | Billy Newman | S | Washington State |
| 20 | 116 | Matthew Hatchette | WR | Langston |
| 21 | 120 | Romaro Miller | QB | Mississippi |

== Personnel ==
=== Staff ===
2003 Amsterdam Admirals staff
| Front office: General Manager – Ronald Buys; Head coaches: Head Coach/Offensive Coordinator – Bart Andrus; Offensive coaches: Running Backs – Amp Lee; Wide Receivers/Tight Ends/Special Teams – Harry Justvig; Offensive Line – Jeff Lewis | Defensive coaches: Defensive Coordinator/Inside Linebackers – Larry Owens; Defensive Line – Darryl Sims; National Coach/Outside Linebackers – John Leijten; Defensive Backs – Martin Bayless; Strength and conditioning: Strength and Conditioning – Joseph Benes |

=== Roster ===
2003 Amsterdam Admirals final roster
| Quarterbacks: 13 Shaun Hill; 9 David Priestley; 12 David Rivers; Running backs: 23 Raymonn Adams; 33 Tellis Redmon; 25 Jonathan Reese; Wide receivers: 19 Eugene Baker; 1 Matthew Hatchette; 2 Kerry Hood; 82 Darcey Levy; 80 Justin Skaggs; 5 T. C. Taylor; 89 Travis Williams; Tight ends: 85 Taman Bryant; 87 Ryan Collins; 88 Kirk McMullen | Offensive linemen: 51 Carey Clayton C; 63 Mike Collins G; 68 Rob Gatrell G; 65 Jeff Grzeskowiak T; 72 Tommy Moody G; 71 Craig Osika C; 75 Lawrence Smith T; 78 Bennitte Waddell T; Defensive linemen: 95 Maurice Anderson DE; 93 Jonathan Brown DE; 98 Jovon Bush NT; 92 Mike Cecere DE; 99 Damonte McKenzie NT/DE; 91 Scott Pospisil NT; 58 Terrell Washington DE | Linebackers: 59 Dwan Epps OLB; 57 Louis Green OLB; 56 Josh Hotchkiss ILB; 52 Tony Ortiz ILB; 53 Mawuko Tugbenyoh ILB; Defensive backs: 21 Fred Booker CB; 35 Troy Grant CB; 30 Kyle Grove CB; 26 Todd Howard CB; 28 Than Merrill FS; 20 Keon Moore SS; 24 Glen Sumter FS; 27 Jordan Younger SS; Special teams: 11 Jeff Crowell P; 16 Jay O'Donnell K | National players: 14 (Netherlands) Silvio Diliberto K; 7 (Japan) Yoshinobu Imoto WR; 54 (Japan) Rikiya Ishida ILB; 73 (Sweden) Michael Jonsson G/T; 55 (Japan) Masafumi Kawaguchi ILB; 22 (France) Sandino Octobre RB; 83 (Mexico) Carlos Rosado WR; 84 (France) Yoan Schnee TE; 53 (Japan) Shinzo Yamada OLB; Rookies in italics |

== Schedule ==
| Week | Date | Kickoff (Note: All times local to where the game was played.) | Opponent | Results | | Game site | Attendance |
| Week | Date | Kickoff | Opponent | Final score | Team record | Game site | Attendance |
|---|---|---|---|---|---|---|---|
| 1 | Saturday, April 5 | 7:00 p.m. | at Rhein Fire | W 17–15 | 1–0 | Arena AufSchalke | 28,206 |
| 2 | Saturday, April 12 | 7:00 p.m. | Barcelona Dragons | L 7–10 | 1–1 | Amsterdam ArenA | 11,386 |
| 3 | Saturday, April 19 | 5:30 p.m. | at Barcelona Dragons | L 17–35 | 1–2 | Mini Estadi | 4,716 |
| 4 | Saturday, April 26 | 5:00 p.m. | Frankfurt Galaxy | W 20–16 | 2–2 | Amsterdam ArenA | 10,684 |
| 5 | Sunday, May 4 | 4:00 p.m. | at Berlin Thunder | L 30–34 | 2–3 | Olympic Stadium | 8,934 |
| 6 | Saturday, May 10 | 7:00 p.m. | Rhein Fire | L 27–34 | 2–4 | Amsterdam ArenA | 11,672 |
| 7 | Saturday, May 17 | 7:00 p.m. | at Frankfurt Galaxy | W 27–24 | 3–4 | Commerzbank-Arena | 23,129 |
| 8 | Saturday, May 24 | 7:00 p.m. | Scottish Claymores | L 20–31 | 3–5 | Amsterdam ArenA | 11,259 |
| 9 | Saturday, May 31 | 7:00 p.m. | Berlin Thunder | W 51–43 | 4–5 | Amsterdam ArenA | 12,207 |
| 10 | Sunday, June 8 | 3:00 p.m. | at Scottish Claymores | L 14–31 | 4–6 | Hampden Park | 10,497 |

== Standings ==
NFL Europe League
| Team | W | L | T | PCT | PF | PA | Home | Road | STK |
|---|---|---|---|---|---|---|---|---|---|
| Frankfurt Galaxy | 6 | 4 | 0 | .600 | 252 | 182 | 4–1 | 2–3 | L1 |
| Rhein Fire | 6 | 4 | 0 | .600 | 189 | 188 | 4–1 | 2–3 | W1 |
| Scottish Claymores | 6 | 4 | 0 | .600 | 303 | 190 | 3–2 | 3–2 | W4 |
| FC Barcelona Dragons | 5 | 5 | 0 | .500 | 150 | 221 | 2–3 | 3–2 | L3 |
| Amsterdam Admirals | 4 | 6 | 0 | .400 | 230 | 273 | 2–3 | 2–3 | L1 |
| Berlin Thunder | 3 | 7 | 0 | .300 | 248 | 318 | 2–3 | 1–4 | W1 |
