= 2003 Berlin Thunder season =

NFL Europe team season

- General manager: Michael Lang
- Head coach: Peter Vaas
- Home stadium: Olympic Stadium

Results
- Record: 3–7
- Division place: 6th
- Playoffs: Did not qualify

The 2003 Berlin Thunder season was the fifth season for the franchise in the NFL Europe League (NFLEL). The team was led by head coach Peter Vaas in his fourth year, and played its home games at Olympic Stadium in Berlin, Germany. They finished the regular season in sixth place with a record of three wins and seven losses.

== Offseason ==
=== Free agent draft ===
2003 Berlin Thunder NFLEL free agent draft selections
Draft order		Player name	Position	College
Round	Choice	Player name	Position	College
1	6	Reggie Grimes	DE	Alabama
2	12	Rod Kelly	DE	NE Oklahoma State
3	13	Daryon Brutley	CB	Northern Iowa
4	24	Mark Baniewicz	T	Syracuse
5	25	Byron Thweatt	LB	Virginia
6	36	Calvin Coleman	CB	Montana
7	37	Setema Gali	DE	Brigham Young
8	48	Salem Simon	DT	Northwestern
9	49	Shannon Wadley	LB	South Carolina
10	60	Tim Carter	CB	Tulane
11	61	Freddie Moore	T	Florida A&M
12	72	Joe Wesley	LB	Louisiana State
13	73	Jykine Bradley	CB	Middle Tennessee
14	84	Marvin Coley	DE	North Alabama
15	85	Michael Cook	T	Boston College
16	96	Cedric Pittman	DE	Nevada
17	97	Aaron Harris	RB	Penn State
18	108	Eli Wnek	DE	Arizona
19	109	Phil Stambaugh	QB	Lehigh
20	119	Kunle Williams	DB	Pennsylvania

== Personnel ==
=== Staff ===
2003 Berlin Thunder staff
Front office: General Manager – Michael Lang; Head coaches: Head Coach – Peter Vaas; Offensive coaches: Offensive Coordinator/Offensive Line – Bob Bicknell; Running Backs – Reggie Brown; Wide Receivers – John Allen; National Coach/Tight Ends/Special Teams – Shuan Fatah	Defensive coaches: Defensive Coordinator/Linebackers – David Duggan; Defensive Line – Mike Sutton; Defensive Backs – Richard Kent; Strength and conditioning: Strength and Conditioning – Joe Shufelt

=== Roster ===
2003 Berlin Thunder final roster
Quarterbacks: 10 Henry Burris; 7 Phil Stambaugh; Running backs: 22 David Allen; 33 Sedrick Irvin; Wide receivers: 5 Pierre Brown; 11 Kirk Rogers; 81 Sean Scott; 2 Elijah Thurmon; Tight ends: 88 Bryan Fletcher; 85 Chad Hayes	Offensive linemen: 72 Michael Cook G; 76 Aaron Crittendon G; 74 Alonzo Cunningham G/T; 73 Kyle Kipps T; 70 Freddie Moore T; 69 Yusuf Scott G/C; 71 Chris Smith T; 67 Josh Warner C; Defensive linemen: 93 Curry Dawson DT; 98 Reggie Grimes DT; 90 Salem Simon DT; 99 Teto Simpson DE; 92 Darian Tate DT; 96 Lamanzer Williams DE (IR); 94 Ryan Wingrove DE	Linebackers: 45 Chris Ball OLB; 54 Chaz Murphy OLB; 57 Josh Symonette OLB; 58 Byron Thweatt MLB; 40 Shannon Wadley MLB; 56 Joe Wesley MLB; 55 Jamal White OLB; Defensive backs: 26 Jykine Bradley CB; 25 Daryon Brutley CB; 29 Tim Carter S (IR); 24 Calvin Coleman CB/S; 27 Travis Coleman CB/S; 38 Clint Finley S; 21 Jeff Harris CB; Special teams: 8 Steve Cheek P; 1 J. R. Jenkins K	National players: 28 (France) Foad Ajdir CB; 86 (England) James Brazier WR; 20 (Germany) Lelan Brickus S; 75 (Germany) Daniel Datz DE; 43 (France) Philippe Gardent OLB (IR); 80 (Germany) Marico Gregersen WR; 84 (Germany) Jörg Heckenbach WR; 35 (France) Patrice Kancel RB; 9 (Germany) Axel Kruse K; Rookies in italics

== Standings ==
NFL Europe League
Team	W	L	T	PCT	PF	PA	Home	Road	STK
Frankfurt Galaxy	6	4	0	.600	252	182	4–1	2–3	L1
Rhein Fire	6	4	0	.600	189	188	4–1	2–3	W1
Scottish Claymores	6	4	0	.600	303	190	3–2	3–2	W4
FC Barcelona Dragons	5	5	0	.500	150	221	2–3	3–2	L3
Amsterdam Admirals	4	6	0	.400	230	273	2–3	2–3	L1
Berlin Thunder	3	7	0	.300	248	318	2–3	1–4	W1
