= Dameon Hunter =

American football player (born 1979)

No. 23, 22
- Position: Running back

Personal information
- Born: February 18, 1979 (age 47); San Bernardino, California, U.S.
- Listed height: 5 ft 11 in (1.80 m)
- Listed weight: 221 lb (100 kg)

Career information
- High school: Rialto (San Bernardino)
- College: Chaffey (1998–1999); Utah (2000–2001)
- NFL draft: 2002: undrafted

Career history
- Baltimore Ravens (2002–2003); → Barcelona Dragons (2003)

Awards and highlights
- Second-team All-MW (2001)

Career NFL statistics
- Games played: 1
- Stats at Pro Football Reference

Dameon DeShawn Hunter (born February 18, 1979) is an American former professional football running back who played in the National Football League (NFL) for the Baltimore Ravens. He played college football for the Chaffey Panthers and Utah Utes. Hunter also had a stint with the Barcelona Dragons in NFL Europe.

== Early life ==
Hunter was born on February 18, 1979, in San Bernardino, California. He attended Rialto High School in San Bernardino.

== College career ==
Hunter played college football for the Chaffey Panthers from 1998 to 1999 and Utah Utes from 2000 to 2001. He played two seasons of junior college football at Chaffey College before he transferred to University of Utah.

Hunter played in 21 games at Utah where he rushed for 1,735 yards, 10 touchdowns and seven receptions for 66 yards. In 2001, he was named to the second-team All-Mountain West team.

== Professional career ==
Pre-draft measurables
Height	Weight	40-yard dash	10-yard split	20-yard split	Vertical jump	Broad jump
5 ft 10 1/2 in (1.79 m)	219 lb (99 kg)	4.63 s	1.58 s	2.65 s	30 1/2 in (0.77 m)	9 ft 5 in (2.87 m)
All values from NFL Combine

=== Baltimore Ravens ===
After going undrafted in the 2002 NFL draft, Hunter signed with the Baltimore Ravens as an undrafted free agent. He made the roster as a backup running back on special teams and appeared in one game, the opener against the Carolina Panthers. Hunter was inactive for the remaining 15 games of the season. On August 25, 2003, he was released by the team.

=== Barcelona Dragons ===
On February 4, 2003, Hunter was allocated to the Barcelona Dragons of NFL Europe. In 10 games, he rushed for 355 yards and four touchdowns with 19 receptions for 134 yards.
