= Dre Moore =

American football player (born 1985)

No. 92
- Position: Defensive tackle

Personal information
- Born: June 9, 1985 (age 41); Charlotte, North Carolina, U.S.
- Listed height: 6 ft 4 in (1.93 m)
- Listed weight: 307 lb (139 kg)

Career information
- High school: Independence (Charlotte)
- College: Maryland
- NFL draft: 2008: 4th round, 115th overall pick

Career history
- Tampa Bay Buccaneers (2008–2009); Jacksonville Jaguars (2010)*; Tampa Bay Storm (2013)
- * Offseason or practice squad member only

Awards and highlights
- First-team All-ACC (2007)

Career NFL statistics
- Total tackles: 4
- Stats at Pro Football Reference

Career AFL statistics
- Total tackles: 2
- Stats at ArenaFan.com

Marchondray James "Dre" Moore (born June 9, 1985) is an American former professional football player who was a defensive tackle in the National Football League (NFL) and Arena Football League (AFL). He was selected by the Tampa Bay Buccaneers in the fourth round of the 2008 NFL draft. He played college football for the Maryland Terrapins.

He was also a member of the Jacksonville Jaguars and Tampa Bay Storm.

== Early life ==
Moore played high school football at Independence High School in Charlotte, North Carolina. He did not start playing football until he was asked to join the junior varsity team as a junior. As a senior, he totaled 107 tackles and three sacks as a varsity player, and earned First-team All-State by the Associated Press. He also helped his team to a 16–0 record and a win in the North Carolina 4AA state championship.

== College career ==
Moore played college football at The University of Maryland, College Park. As a senior, he Earned first-team All-Conference honors. He finished his college career starting 26 of 44 games with 10.5 sacks. He graduated with a degree in Family Studies.

== Professional career ==
=== Tampa Bay Buccaneers ===
Moore was selected by the Tampa Bay Buccaneers in the fourth round of the 2008 NFL draft. On August 30, he was waived by the team during final cuts. The Buccaneers re-signed him to the practice squad two days later on September 1. He appeared in his first NFL game during week 10 of the 2009 season against the Miami Dolphins. He finished the season with five tackles in seven games. Moore was waived during final cuts on September 4, 2010.

=== Jacksonville Jaguars ===
On November 13, 2010, Moore was signed to the practice squad of the Jaguars after having undergone previous workouts for a number of other teams, including the Philadelphia Eagles.

=== Tampa Bay Storm ===
On July 25, 2013, Moore was assigned to the Tampa Bay Storm of the Arena Football League. On January 31, 2014, Moore announced his retirement.
