= 2003 Scottish Claymores season =

NFL Europe team season

- General manager: Steve Livingstone
- Head coach: Gene Dahlquist
- Home stadium: Hampden Park

Results
- Record: 6–4
- Division place: 3rd
- Playoffs: Did not qualify

The 2003 Scottish Claymores season was the ninth season for the franchise in the NFL Europe League (NFLEL). The team was led by head coach Gene Dahlquist in his third year, and played its home games at Hampden Park in Glasgow, Scotland. They finished the regular season in third place with a record of six wins and four losses.

== Offseason ==
=== Free agent draft ===
2003 Scottish Claymores NFLEL free agent draft selections
Draft order		Player name	Position	College
Round	Choice	Player name	Position	College
1	3	Jermaine Chatman	CB	Arizona
2	9	Deveron Harper	CB	Notre Dame
3	16	Chris Brown	T	Georgia Tech
4	21	Michael Jennings	WR	Florida State
5	28	Ronald "Bo" Rogers	CB	Western Michigan
6	33	Gary Davis	LB	New Mexico
7	40	Chris Ball	LB	California
8	45	Ryan Nielsen	DT	Southern California
9	52	Keon Moore	CB	Southern Mississippi
10	57	Radell Lockhart	DE	Catawba
11	64	DeVonte Peterson	DT	Catawba
12	69	Yubrenal Isabelle	LB	Virginia
13	76	Scott Shields	S	Weber State
14	81	Giovanni Toccagino	TE	Menlo
15	88	Kenny Jackson	DT	Mississippi
16	93	Deron Tyler	CB	Kansas State
17	100	John Capel	WR	Florida
18	105	Joey Slayton	T	Southern Methodist
19	112	Darnell Robinson	LB	Oregon State

== Personnel ==
=== Staff ===
2003 Scottish Claymores staff
Front office: General manager – Steve Livingstone; Head coaches: Head coach – Gene Dahlquist; Offensive coaches: Offensive coordinator/wide receivers – Ken Margerum; National coach/running backs – Stephen McCusker; Offensive line – Don Eck; Offensive line/tight ends – Reggie McElroy	Defensive coaches: Defensive coordinator/linebackers – Ray Woodard; Defensive line – Jim Tomsula; Defensive backs – Charles Lee; Strength and conditioning: Strength and conditioning – Martin Streight

=== Roster ===
2003 Scottish Claymores final roster
Quarterbacks: 1 Craig Nall; 14 Shane Stafford; Running backs: 33 Maurice Hicks; 20 Mike Malan; 24 Ken Simonton; Wide receivers: 82 Anthony Bright; 80 John Minardi; 86 Edell Shepherd; Tight ends: 85 Rashod Kent; 87 Rod Trafford	Offensive linemen: 69 Justin Bland T; 63 James Broyles G; 64 Dave Costa T; 66 Joe Johnson T; 67 Brandon Moore G; 70 Kenny Sandlin G/C; 68 Jason Scukanec C; Defensive linemen: 90 T. J. Bingham DE; 92 Nate Bolling DT; 97 Michael Landry DT; 94 Radell Lockhart DE; 95 DeVonte Peterson DT; 99 Chris Ward DE	Linebackers: 51 Yubrenal Isabelle MLB; 58 Isaac Keys OLB; 56 Jermaine Petty OLB; 59 Darnell Robinson OLB; Defensive backs: 26 Dyshod Carter CB; 27 Jermaine Chatman CB; 22 J'Juan Cherry CB; 28 Deveron Harper CB; 43 Bobby Jackson SS/FS; 44 Robbie Robinson SS; 23 Ron Rogers CB; 25 James Rooths FS; Special teams: 7 Brian Holmes K; 9 Kevin Stemke P	National players: 21 (England) Rowelle Blenman CB/S; 81 (Scotland) Scott Couper WR; 54 (England) Aden Durde OLB; 91 (England) Robert Flickinger DE; 57 (Scotland) Stuart Hare OLB; 8 (England) Rob Hart K; 30 (England) Stephen Hutchinson RB; 16 (England) Scott McCready WR; 46 (Scotland) Jeff Nicolson TE; 50 (Sweden) Jens Pettersson MLB; Rookies in italics

== Standings ==
NFL Europe League
Team	W	L	T	PCT	PF	PA	Home	Road	STK
Frankfurt Galaxy	6	4	0	.600	252	182	4–1	2–3	L1
Rhein Fire	6	4	0	.600	189	188	4–1	2–3	W1
Scottish Claymores	6	4	0	.600	303	190	3–2	3–2	W4
FC Barcelona Dragons	5	5	0	.500	150	221	2–3	3–2	L3
Amsterdam Admirals	4	6	0	.400	230	273	2–3	2–3	L1
Berlin Thunder	3	7	0	.300	248	318	2–3	1–4	W1
