= Courtney Ledyard =

American gridiron football player (born 1977)

No. 53
- Position: Linebacker

Personal information
- Born: March 9, 1977 (age 49); Shaker Heights, Ohio, U.S.
- Listed height: 6 ft 2 in (1.88 m)
- Listed weight: 250 lb (113 kg)

Career information
- High school: Shaker Heights (OH)
- College: Michigan State
- NFL draft: 1999: undrafted

Career history
- New York Jets (1999–2000)*; New England Patriots (2003)*; Rhein Fire (2003); Montreal Alouettes (2004)
- * Offseason or practice squad member only
- Stats at Pro Football Reference

Courtney Ledyard (born March 9, 1977) is an American former professional football linebacker. He played for the New York Jets in 2000 and for the Montreal Alouettes in 2004.
