= Derrick Ham =

American football player (born 1975)

No. 71, 73, 75
- Position: Defensive end

Personal information
- Born: March 23, 1975 (age 51); Merritt Island, Florida
- Listed height: 6 ft 4 in (1.93 m)
- Listed weight: 270 lb (122 kg)

Career information
- High school: Merritt Island
- College: Miami (FL)
- NFL draft: 1999: undrafted

Career history
- Washington Redskins (1999)*; Rhein Fire (2000); Washington Redskins (2000); Cleveland Browns (2001); Rhein Fire (2003)
- * Offseason or practice squad member only

Awards and highlights
- All-NFL Europe (2000)

Career NFL statistics
- Games played: 2
- Stats at Pro Football Reference

Derrick Jerome Ham (born March 23, 1975) is an American former professional football player who was a defensive end in the National Football League (NFL). He played college football for the Miami Hurricanes. Ham played in the NFL for one game with the Washington Redskins in 2000 and one game for the Cleveland Browns in 2001.
