= David Rivers (quarterback) =

American football player (born 1977)

No. 12, 8, 14
- Position: Quarterback

Personal information
- Born: September 1, 1977 (age 49); Greenville, South Carolina, U.S.
- Listed height: 6 ft 3 in (1.91 m)
- Listed weight: 220 lb (100 kg)

Career information
- High school: Lakeside (Evans, Georgia)
- College: Virginia (1996–1999); Western Carolina (2000)
- NFL draft: 2001: undrafted

Career history
- St. Louis Rams (2001)*; BC Lions (2001–2002); Toronto Argonauts (2002); Atlanta Falcons (2003)*; → Amsterdam Admirals (2003); Berlin Thunder (2004); Atlanta Falcons (2004)*; Oakland Raiders (2004)
- * Offseason or practice squad member only

Awards and highlights
- World Bowl champion (2004)

David P. Rivers (born September 1, 1977) is an American former professional football quarterback who played in NFL Europe and the Canadian Football League (CFL). He played college football at Virginia and Western Carolina. He also had a short stint on the active roster of the Oakland Raiders of the National Football League (NFL).

== Early life ==
David P. Rivers was born on September 1, 1977, in Greenville, South Carolina. He attended Lakeside High School in Evans, Georgia.

== College career ==
Rivers first played college football for the Virginia Cavaliers of the University of Virginia. He redshirted the 1996 season. He completed one of two passes for four yards in 1997. Rivers remained in a backup role in 1998, serving as the third-string quarterback. He did not play in any games at quarterback that year but did appear in three games on kickoff coverage. On November 6, 1999, Rivers who had been serving as the team's long snapper on punts up until that point, made his first career start at quarterback in relief of the injured Dan Ellis. Rivers helped Virginia upset No. 7 Georgia Tech by a score of 45–38. He completed 18 of 30 passes for 228 yards, three touchdowns, and one interception in the game.

In 2000, Rivers transferred to play his final season of college football for the Western Carolina Catamounts. He completed 208 of 350 passes for 2,878 yards, 17 touchdowns, and nine interceptions during the 2000 season. His completion and passing yardage totals were both the second best in school history while his touchdown total was the third best. Rivers was invited to both the Senior Bowl and the Blue–Gray Football Classic.

== Professional career ==
After going undrafted in the 2001 NFL draft, Rivers signed with the St. Louis Rams on April 23, 2001. He was released on June 13, 2001.

Rivers signed with the BC Lions of the Canadian Football League (CFL) on June 19, 2001. He dressed in all 18 games for the Lions during the 2001 CFL season, completing three of five passes for 37 yards and one interception while also rushing twice for five yards. He was released by BC on July 4, 2002.

Rivers was signed by the CFL's Toronto Argonauts on August 29, 2002. He dressed in four games for the Argonauts, recording two completions on six passing attempts for 20 yards and two interceptions, before being placed on injured reserve.

On January 17, 2003, Rivers signed with the Atlanta Falcons of the National Football League (NFL). He was allocated to NFL Europe to play for the Amsterdam Admirals. He appeared in three games for Amsterdam during the 2003 NFL Europe season as the backup to Shaun Hill, completing 23 of 28 passes (82.1%) for 224 yards and two touchdowns. Rivers then suffered a season-ending knee injury. He was released by the Falcons on September 1 but signed to the practice squad the next day. He was released again on September 9, 2003.

In 2004, Rivers played in five games for the Berlin Thunder of NFL Europe as the backup to Rohan Davey. In Week 9 against the Scottish Claymores, Rivers entered the game after Davey was benched. Rivers then completed 18 of 24 passes for 202 yards and two touchdowns to help the Thunder win 27–19. Rivers was named the NFL Europe Offensive Player of the Week for his performance. Overall in 2004, he completed 42 of 59 passes (71.2%) for 403 yards and four touchdowns while also rushing eight times for 40 yards and one touchdown. On June 12, 2004, the Thunder won World Bowl XII against the Frankfurt Galaxy by a score of 30–24. Rivers signed with the Falcons again on June 21, but was later released on August 31, 2004.

Rivers was signed to the practice squad of the NFL's Oakland Raiders on October 20, 2004. He was promoted to the active roster on December 24, wearing jersey number 14. He became a free agent after the 2004 season, and re-signed with the Raiders on April 27, 2005. Rivers was released on August 29, 2005.

== Personal life ==
Rivers has worked in the real estate industry since his football career.
