= Reggie Brown (running back) =

American football player (born 1960)

No. 46, 29, 24
- Position: Running back

Personal information
- Born: March 12, 1960 (age 66); Dendron, Virginia, U.S.
- Listed height: 5 ft 11 in (1.80 m)
- Listed weight: 211 lb (96 kg)

Career information
- High school: Malcolm X Shabazz (Newark, New Jersey)
- College: Pasadena City College (1978–1979); Oregon (1980–1981)
- NFL draft: 1982: 4th round, 95th overall pick

Career history

Playing
- Atlanta Falcons (1982–1983); Cleveland Browns (1984)*; Los Angeles Express (1984); Arizona Outlaws (1985); Philadelphia Eagles (1987)
- * Offseason or practice squad member only

Coaching
- Berlin Thunder (2003); Running backs coach

Career NFL statistics
- Rushing yards: 136
- Rushing average: 3.5
- Receptions: 8
- Receiving yards: 53
- Stats at Pro Football Reference

Reginald Van Brown (born March 12, 1960) is an American former professional football player who was a running back in the National Football League (NFL) and United States Football League (USFL). He played college football for the Oregon Ducks. He played in the NFL for the Atlanta Falcons and Philadelphia Eagles, and in the USFL for the Los Angeles Express and Arizona Outlaws. He was the running backs coach for the 2003 Berlin Thunder.
