= Dustin Cohen =

American football player (born 1976)

No. 58, 56
- Position: Linebacker

Personal information
- Born: December 22, 1976 (age 49); Cincinnati, Ohio, U.S.
- Listed height: 6 ft 3 in (1.91 m)
- Listed weight: 236 lb (107 kg)

Career information
- High school: Summitt Country Day (Cincinnati)
- College: Miami (OH)
- NFL draft: 2000: undrafted

Career history
- Buffalo Bills (2000)*; Chicago Bears (2000)*; St. Louis Rams (2000–2001); Detroit Lions (2002)*; Kansas City Chiefs (2003)*; → Frankfurt Galaxy (2003-2004); Tampa Bay Buccaneers (2004)*
- * Offseason or practice squad member only

Awards and highlights
- 2× First-team All-MAC (1998, 1999); Second-team All-MAC (1997)

Career NFL statistics
- Games played: 5
- Total tackles: 3
- Stats at Pro Football Reference

Dustin Will Cohen (born December 22, 1976) is an American former professional football player who was a linebacker for the St. Louis Rams of the National Football League (NFL). He played college football for the Miami RedHawks.
