= 2003 FC Barcelona Dragons season =

NFL Europe team season

- General manager: Rafael Cervera
- Head coach: Jack Bicknell
- Home stadium: Mini Estadi

Results
- Record: 5–5
- Division place: 4th
- Playoffs: Did not qualify

The 2003 FC Barcelona Dragons season was the 11th and final season for the franchise in the NFL Europe League (NFLE). The team was led by head coach Jack Bicknell in his 11th year, and played its home games at Mini Estadi in Barcelona, Catalonia, Spain. They finished the regular season in fourth place with a record of five wins and five losses.

== Offseason ==
=== Free agent draft ===
2003 Barcelona Dragons NFLEL free agent draft selections
Draft order		Player name	Position	College
Round	Choice	Player name	Position	College
1	1	Jabari Issa	DT	Washington
2	7	J'Juan Cherry	CB	Arizona State
3	18	Anthony Sessions	LB	Tennessee
4	19	Antuan Simmons	CB	Southern California
5	30	Jerry Johnson	DT	Florida State
6	31	Marcus Smith	CB	Memphis
7	42	Terrance Dukes	LB	Grambling State
8	43	Kenny Harney	LB	South Carolina
9	54	Josh Heupel	QB	Oklahoma
10	55	John Feugill	T	Maryland
11	66	Rameel Connor	DE	Illinois
12	67	Renard Cox	CB	Maryland
13	78	Rashad Harris	LB	Louisville
14	79	Kyle Grove	CB	Norfolk State
15	90	Ryan Fisher	DT	Oklahoma
16	91	Jason Short	LB	Eastern Michigan
17	102	Ryan Deterding	T	Shadron State
18	103	Zane Gilmore	RB	Missouri
19	114	Aaron Dematteo	WR	Chattanooga
20	115	Adam Young	TE	Dartmouth

== Personnel ==
=== Staff ===
2003 Barcelona Dragons staff
Front office: General manager – Rafael Cervera; Head coaches: Head coach – Jack Bicknell; Offensive coaches: Offensive coordinator/offensive line – Vince Martino; Quarterbacks/wide receivers – Sam Rutigliano; National coach/running backs – Marcos Guirles	Defensive coaches: Defensive coordinator/defensive backs – Dan Daniel; Defensive line – Denauld Brown; Linebackers – Rick Lantz; Defensive assistant – Hugh Green; Strength and conditioning: Strength and conditioning – Dave Mikel

=== Roster ===
2003 Barcelona Dragons final roster
Quarterbacks: 12 Seth Burford; 5 Chris Finlen; 8 Kyle McCann; Running backs: 7 Jeff Chaney; 38 Tyree Foreman; 22 Dameon Hunter; Wide receivers: 88 Dimitrius Breedlove; 86 Kerwin Cook; 82 Sean Morey; 80 Ezekiel Parker; Tight ends: 87 Matt Cercone; 45 Gabe Crecion	Offensive linemen: 65 Troy Andrew G; 74 John Feugill T; 68 Shane Grice G; 61 Shawn Lynch C; 71 Melvin Paige T/G; 69 Ray Redziniak C/G; 79 Akil Smith T; 64 Milford Stephenson G; Defensive linemen: 90 Kevin Aldridge DT; 93 Marvin Coley DT; 77 Kevin DeRonde DE; 97 Toby Golliday DT; 72 Jabari Issa DT; 53 Merceda Perry DE; 98 Jermaine Petty DE; 50 Jason Short DE	Linebackers: 44 Kenny Harney OLB; 52 Rashad Harris OLB; 57 Dwayne Levels OLB; 55 Tito Rodriguez MLB; Defensive backs: 27 Larry Austin CB; 25 Bruce Branch CB (IR); 33 Renard Cox SS; 29 Jason Olford CB; 36 James Lewis SS/FS; 24 Antuan Simmons CB; 26 Marcus Smith FS/CB; 23 Jason Waters CB; Special teams: 16 Nick Murphy P; 11 Jason Witczak K	National players: 51 (Spain) Oscar Acedo OLB; 14 (Spain) Jesús Angoy K; 56 (France) Cedric Cotar MLB; 84 (Mexico) Alejandro Gamez WR; 2 (France) Samyr Hamoudi FS; 28 (France) Laurent Marceline RB; 1 (Mexico) Marco Martos WR; 54 (Mexico) Antonio Rodriguez MLB; Rookies in italics

== Standings ==
NFL Europe League
Team	W	L	T	PCT	PF	PA	Home	Road	STK
Frankfurt Galaxy	6	4	0	.600	252	182	4–1	2–3	L1
Rhein Fire	6	4	0	.600	189	188	4–1	2–3	W1
Scottish Claymores	6	4	0	.600	303	190	3–2	3–2	W4
FC Barcelona Dragons	5	5	0	.500	150	221	2–3	3–2	L3
Amsterdam Admirals	4	6	0	.400	230	273	2–3	2–3	L1
Berlin Thunder	3	7	0	.300	248	318	2–3	1–4	W1
