= Steve Cheek =

American football player (born 1977)

No. 5
- Position: Punter

Personal information
- Born: April 18, 1977 (age 49); Westfield, New Jersey, U.S.
- Listed height: 6 ft 4 in (1.93 m)
- Listed weight: 205 lb (93 kg)

Career information
- High school: Westfield
- College: Humboldt State
- NFL draft: 2001: undrafted

Career history
- San Francisco 49ers (2001)*; Philadelphia Eagles (2002)*; New York Giants (2003)*; Berlin Thunder (2003); Houston Texans (2004)*; Cologne Centurions (2004); Kansas City Chiefs (2004); Carolina Panthers (2005)*
- * Offseason or practice squad member only

Career NFL statistics
- Punts: 42
- Punt yards: 1,643
- Yards per punt: 39.1
- Stats at Pro Football Reference

Stephen Andrew Cheek (born April 18, 1977) is an American former professional football player who was a punter in the National Football League (NFL) for the Kansas City Chiefs. He played college football for the Humboldt State Lumberjacks.

Cheek served as the head coach of the senior elite division Argonautes of Aix-en-Provence. The Argonautes are a well-known American football team located in the South of France.

== Early life ==
Born and raised in Westfield, Cheek played his high school football at Westfield High School, where he was an all-conference quarterback.

== Professional career ==
Cheek was signed in 2001 by the San Francisco 49ers as an undrafted free agent out of Humboldt State University, where he also played quarterback in addition to performing punting duties.

He has spent time in training camps with the 49ers, the Philadelphia Eagles, the New York Giants, and the Houston Texans (who traded him to the Chiefs for a seventh round pick after the preseason), and the Carolina Panthers.

He also participated in NFL Europa with the Berlin Thunder in 2003 and Cologne Centurions in 2004. The Chiefs were the first NFL team that he saw regular season action with.

Recently he has been signed by French football team Argonautes d'Aix-en-Provence as offensive assistant coach and special teams coach.
