= Radell Lockhart =

American football player and coach (born 1979)

Radell Bernard Lockhart (born May 11, 1979 in Charlotte, North Carolina) is an American football defensive line coach with the Catawba Indians college football team.

== High school career ==
Radell was a three-year starter at Independence High School in his home town and lettered in track.

== College career ==
Lockhart was a four-year letterman who played in 44 games as defensive end.

Year	Starts	Tackles	Other plays	Honors
1997 (Freshman)	11	36	1.5 sacks, 2 quarterback pressures	
1998 (Sophomore)	10	43	3.5 sacks, 2 fumble recoveries and a blocked field goal	
1999 (Junior)	11	78	12 sacks, 40 quarterback pressures and 45 tackles for a loss	Named second-team, All-Conference and first-team, All-Region as a junior
2000 (Senior)	12	74	31 tackles for a loss, 10 sacks and 44 quarterback pressures	Earned first team All-America, All-Region and All-Conference honours. Named Defensive conference player of the year

== Pro career ==
Lockhart's professional career began when he signed with the Jacksonville Jaguars as an undrafted college free agent on April 26, 2001; he was released by Jacksonville following training camp on August 30, 2001. He was signed by the New England Patriots six months later, on February 11, 2002 and allocated to the Scottish Claymores of NFL Europe. As their defensive end he totaled 18 tackles (14 solos), forced three fumbles and broke up two passes.

He was released by New England after training camp on August 30, 2002 but played a second season in NFL Europe with the Scottish Claymores after being a protected player and being drafted as a free agent. During the 2003 NFL Europe season Lockhart had 25 tackles (19 solo), 6 sacks, a forced fumble and 10 passes defensed.

He was signed by the New York Giants on June 18, 2003 after the 2003 NFL Europe season ended. After being released by the Giants on September 1, 2003, he made his third appearance in the NFL Europe League, this time appearing with the Frankfurt Galaxy, whom he helped to an appearance in the 2004 World Bowl.

Radell re-signed with the New York Giants and took a place on their practice squad on July 29, 2004 but was released again two months later, on September 6, 2004. He then signed with the New York Jets practice squad on September 6, 2005 and was released from the practice squad on September 27, 2005. He was signed to the San Diego Chargers practice squad on December 13, 2005 and released from the practice squad December 28, 2005.

== Post-pro career ==
After being released by the San Diego Chargers, Radell went back to his college roots at Catawba College to become their defensive line assistant coach where he remains today.
