= Jonas Lewis =

American gridiron football player (born 1976)

No. 43
- Position: Linebacker

Personal information
- Born: December 27, 1976 (age 49); Riverside, California, U.S.
- Listed height: 5 ft 9 in (1.75 m)
- Listed weight: 210 lb (95 kg)

Career information
- High school: Beaumont (CA)
- College: San Diego State
- NFL draft: 2000: undrafted

Career history
- San Francisco 49ers (2000–2001); Detroit Lions (2002)*; Frankfurt Galaxy (2003); Houston Texans (2003)*; Montreal Alouettes (2004–2005)
- * Offseason or practice squad member only

Awards and highlights
- Second-team All-Mountain West (1999)
- Stats at Pro Football Reference

Jonas Lewis (born December 27, 1976) is an American former professional football linebacker. He played for the San Francisco 49ers from 2000 to 2001 and for the Montreal Alouettes from 2004 to 2005.
