= Chris Pointer =

American football player (born 1976)

No. 3, 19
- Position: Defensive back

Personal information
- Born: February 2, 1976 (age 50); Louisville, Kentucky, U.S.
- Listed height: 5 ft 11 in (1.80 m)
- Listed weight: 190 lb (86 kg)

Career information
- High school: Louisville (KY) Male
- College: Kentucky State
- NFL draft: 2001: undrafted

Career history
- Norfolk Nighthawks (2001); Toronto Phantoms (2002); New Jersey Gladiators (2002); New Orleans VooDoo (2004–2005); Kansas City Brigade (2006); Nashville Kats (2007); Columbus Destroyers (2008)

Career AFL statistics
- Tackles: 254
- Pass breakups: 49
- Interceptions: 3
- Forced fumbles: 5
- Fumbles recoveries: 2
- Stats at ArenaFan.com

Chris Pointer (born February 2, 1976) is a former defensive back in the Arena Football League (AFL). He played for the Norfolk Nighthawks, Toronto Phantoms, New Jersey Gladiators, the New Orleans VooDoo, the Kansas City Brigade, Nashville Kats and Columbus Destroyers.

== Early life ==
Pointer attended Louisville Male High School, where he was a member of the football and track and field teams.

== College career ==
Pointer attended Kentucky State University and was a three-year starter at cornerback.
