= David Venable =

American TV personality and author (born 1964)

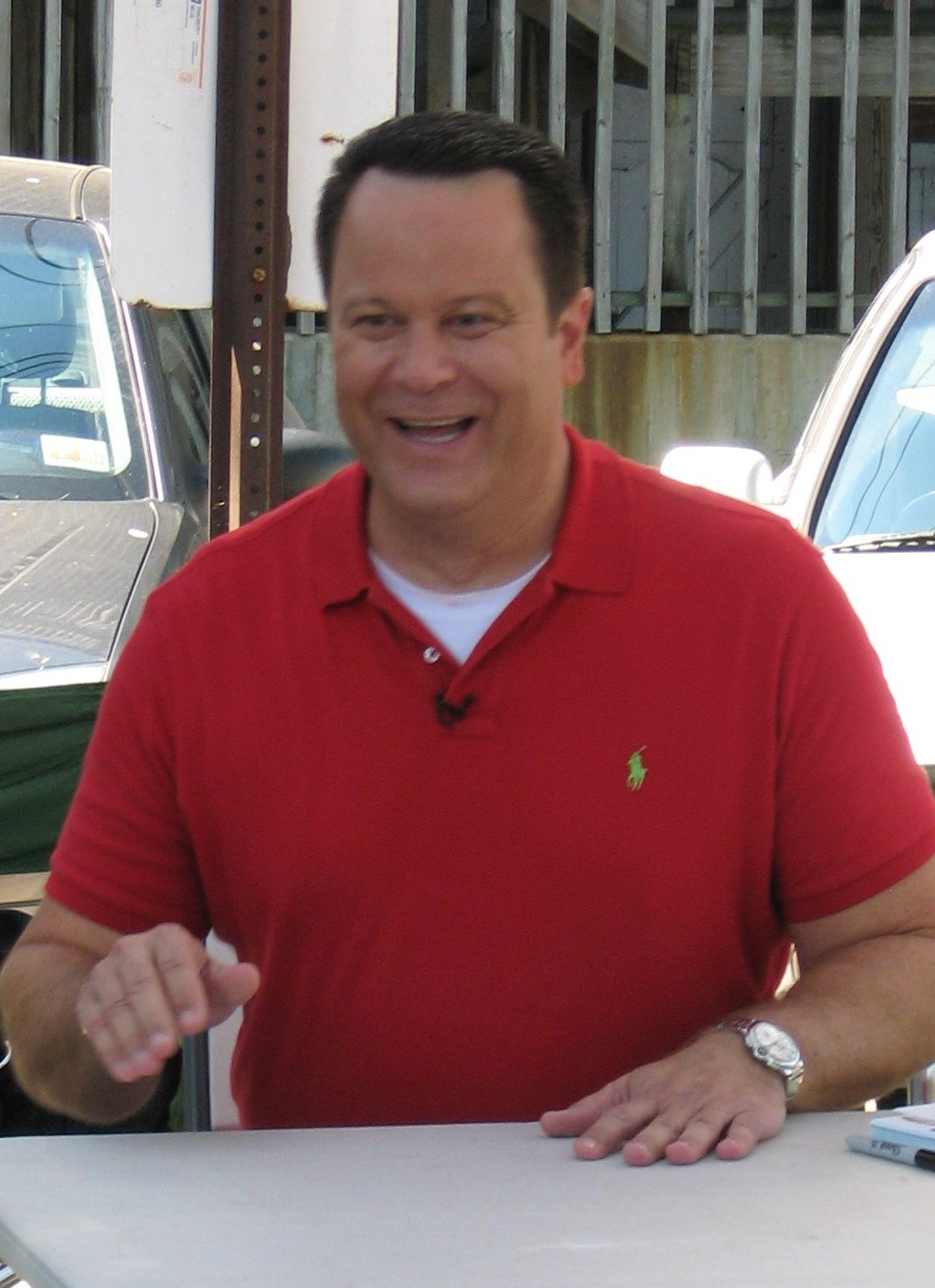
- Venable in 2013
- Born: November 12, 1964 (age 61); Charlotte, North Carolina, U.S.
- Education: University of North Carolina at Chapel Hill
- Occupations: TV personality; Author
- Years active: 1993–present
- Known for: In the Kitchen with David

David Venable (born November 12, 1964) is an American TV personality and author who has hosted In the Kitchen with David on QVC since 2009. He has also written cookbooks based on the show.

== Early life ==
Venable was born on November 12, 1964, in Charlotte, North Carolina. He studied journalism at the University of North Carolina at Chapel Hill.

== Career life after college ==
After graduating from the University of North Carolina he worked as a reporter at WTAJ-TV in Altoona, Pennsylvania. He then moved on to work at WOAY-TV in Oak Hill, West Virginia where he hosted “Action Newsmakers."

== Work on QVC ==
Venable was hired by QVC in 1993. He started by promoting the gourmet food products of the company through the station. As time went on, he gradually increased his position on the channel and then started to host his own shows.

== Publications ==
Venable has released four cookbooks.

Book	Publication
In the Kitchen with David: QVC's Resident Foodie Presents Comfort Foods That Take You Home	2012
Back Around the Table: An "In the Kitchen with David" Cookbook from QVC's Resident Foodie	2014
Comfort Food Shortcuts: An "In the Kitchen with David" Cookbook	2018
Half Homemade, Fully Delicious: An "In The Kitchen with David" Cookbook	2021
