= 2003 NFL Europe season =

European-American football season

The 2003 NFL Europe season was the 11th season in 13 years of the American football league that started out as the World League of American Football. Three NFL Europe teams had new homes for the 2003 season: Berlin Thunder at Berlin's Olympic Stadium, the F.C. Barcelona Dragons at Mini Estadi, and the Rhein Fire, at Arena AufSchalke in Gelsenkirchen.

== Standings ==
NFL Europe League
Team	W	L	T	PCT	PF	PA	Home	Road	STK
Frankfurt Galaxy	6	4	0	.600	252	182	4–1	2–3	L1
Rhein Fire	6	4	0	.600	189	188	4–1	2–3	W1
Scottish Claymores	6	4	0	.600	303	190	3–2	3–2	W4
FC Barcelona Dragons	5	5	0	.500	150	221	2–3	3–2	L3
Amsterdam Admirals	4	6	0	.400	230	273	2–3	2–3	L1
Berlin Thunder	3	7	0	.300	248	318	2–3	1–4	W1

== World Bowl XI ==
World Bowl XI took place on Saturday, June 14, 2003, at Hampden Park in Glasgow, Scotland. Frankfurt Galaxy defeated Rhein Fire, 35–16.
