= World Bowl XI =

2003 NFL Europe championship game

Rhein Fire (2nd)	Frankfurt Galaxy (1st)
16	35
	1	2	3	4	Total
RHE	3	6	0	7	16
FRA	11	14	7	3	35
- Date: Saturday, June 14, 2003
- Stadium: Hampden Park, Glasgow, Scotland
- MVP: Jonas Lewis, Running back
- Referee: Pete Morelli
- Attendance: 28,138

Ceremonies
- Halftime show: Sugababes

TV in the United States
- Network: Fox
- Announcers: Curt Menefee and Brian Baldinger

World Bowl XI was NFL Europe's 2003 championship game. It was played at Hampden Park in Glasgow, Scotland on June 14, 2003.

The crowd were entertained pre-match by Scottish rock legend Fish performing a rousing rendition of “Caledonia”. Half time entertainment was headlined by the popular Sugababes.

The game was between the 6–4 Rhein Fire and the 6–4 Frankfurt Galaxy. The Fire was hoping to avenge last year's loss to Berlin, while the Galaxy was looking for their first World Bowl title since 1999. 28,138 fans were in attendance, as the Galaxy easily won 35–16 over the Fire. Galaxy running back Jonas Lewis earned Most Valuable Player honors, when he ran 16 times for 126 yards (World Bowl record) and a touchdown, with his longest run being 42 yards.

== Background ==
The Fire won the first meeting 14–7 in Düsseldorf, while the Galaxy won the second meeting 38–7 in Frankfurt.

== Game summary ==
The Galaxy drew first blood with a 4-point field goal, which was Jon Hilbert's 53-yard attempt. On their next attempt, Galaxy quarterback James Brown led his team 8-play, 79-yard drive that ended with Lewis running the ball in from a yard out. The Fire tried to respond with a touchdown, but Frankfurt's defense made them settle for a 39-yard field goal by Todd France. In the second quarter, after the Fire goofed a punt attempt, Frankfurt quarterback Quinn Gray led his team on a 3-play, 15-yard drive and he concluded it with a 10-yard pass to wide receiver Marc Lester. Again, the Fire tried to respond with a touchdown of their own, but again, the Galaxy defense made them settle for another field goal, which was a 31-yarder by Ingo Anderbrügge. Afterwards, the Galaxy would quickly respond with a 3-play, 79-yard drive that ended with running back Robert Gillespie running 29 yards for a touchdown. With only two minutes left until halftime, the Fire desperately needed a touchdown to keep up with Frankfurt. At first, their drive showed promise as they started from their own 44-yard line and managed to get to Frankfurt's 9-yard line. Unfortunately, the drive stalled once the Fire got there and they had to settle for 27-yard field goal by Anderbrügge. At halftime, the Galaxy had a comfortable 25–9 lead over the Fire. In the third quarter, Rhein got the ball to begin the second half and on their opening drive and the Fire managed to get to Frankfurt's 1-yard line. However, they failed to get the ball in on 3rd & goal. Then, on 4th & goal, Fire center Dustin Keith fumbled the ball and Galaxy defensive tackle Daniel Benetka managed to recover the ball, preventing Rhein from another touchdown opportunity. After Benetka got the ball for Frankfurt, Brown lead his team on a 10-play, 99-yard drive that ended with running back Adam Tate running in for a 1-yard touchdown strike. Heading into the fourth quarter, the Fire trailed 32–9 and only a miracle could save any hope of Rhein winning another World Bowl title. Alas, the Galaxy would just kick a 34-yard field goal by Ralf Kleinmann to increase their lead and make the score 35–9. Even though the Rhein Fire would finally respond with a 5-yard touchdown pass from Chris Greisen to Dwayne Blakely, it was too little, too late for the Fire. When the official clock reached 00:00, the Galaxy celebrated their third World Bowl victory in franchise history.

=== Scoring summary ===
	1	2	3	4	Total
Rhein	3	6	0	7	16
Frankfurt	11	14	7	3	35

- Frankfurt - 4-Point FG Hilbert 53 yd 2:55 1st
- Frankfurt - TD Lewis 1 yd 9:18 1st
- Rhein - FG France 39 yd 14:04 1st
- Frankfurt - TD Lester 20 yd pass from Gray 5:07 2nd
- Rhein - FG Anderbrügge 31 yd 11:18 2nd
- Frankfurt - TD Gillespie 29 yd run 12:54 2nd
- Rhein - FG Anderbrügge 27 yd 15:00 2nd
- Frankfurt - TD Tate 1 yd run 11:47 3rd
- Frankfurt - FG Kleinmann 34 yd 10:23 4th
- Rhein - TD Blakley 47 yd pass from Greisen 13:05 4th

== Officials ==
- Referee: Pete Morelli #135
- Umpire: Tony Michalek #115
- Head Linesman: Jim Mello #150
- Line Judge: Derick Bowers #138
- Side Judge: Michael Banks #72
- Field Judge: Rob Vernatchi #75
- Back Judge: Steve Freeman #133
