= 1998 New England Patriots season =

39th season in franchise history

- Owner: Robert Kraft
- Head coach: Pete Carroll
- Home stadium: Foxboro Stadium

Results
- Record: 9–7
- Division place: 4th AFC East
- Playoffs: Lost Wild Card Playoffs (at Jaguars) 10–25
- All-Pros: CB Ty Law (1st team); TE Ben Coates (2nd team); SS Lawyer Milloy (2nd team)
- Pro Bowlers: TE Ben Coates; CB Ty Law; SS Lawyer Milloy

The 1998 New England Patriots season was the franchise's 29th season in the National Football League (NFL) and the 39th overall. They finished with a 9–7 record, losing in the first round of the playoffs to the Jacksonville Jaguars.

In the offseason, the Patriots tendered restricted free agent running back Curtis Martin with the highest possible tender, which would return the Patriots first- and third-round draft picks if any team were to sign him and the Patriots were to decide not to match the offer. Fueling the rivalry between the two teams, the New York Jets and head coach Bill Parcells, who had resigned from the Patriots two years earlier, signed Martin, the 1995 NFL Offensive Rookie of the Year, and per restricted free agency rules ceded their first- and third-round picks in the 1998 NFL draft to the Patriots. With the first-round pick the Patriots selected another running back Robert Edwards, who rushed for over 1,000 yards in his rookie campaign. Suffering a broken finger in November, veteran quarterback Drew Bledsoe was unable to start the team's final two regular season games and was replaced by Scott Zolak. With a 9–7 record the Patriots finished fourth in the AFC East but earned a sixth seed in the AFC playoffs. With Zolak still at the helm, the Patriots were defeated on the road by the Jacksonville Jaguars, the second straight playoff defeat for second-year head coach Pete Carroll, and is one of only four games the Patriots have ever lost to the Jaguars, with the other three being in 2018, 2024, and 2026 respectively.

As of the 2025 NFL season, this remains the last time that a team with a fourth-place finish in its division made the playoffs.

== Offseason ==
Additions	Subtractions
RB Tony Carter (Bears)	RB Curtis Martin (Jets)
	RB Dave Meggett (Jets)
	WR Dietrich Jells (Eagles)

=== 1998 NFL draft ===
1998 New England Patriots draft
Round	Pick	Player	Position	College	Notes
1	18	Robert Edwards	Running back	Georgia	from N. Y. Jets
1	22	Tebucky Jones	Safety	Georgia	
2	52	Tony Simmons	Wide receiver	Wisconsin	from N. Y. Jets
2	54	Rod Rutledge	Tight end	Alabama	
3	81	Chris Floyd	Fullback	Michigan	from N. Y. Jets
3	83	Greg Spires	Defensive end	Florida State	
4	115	Leonta Rheams	Defensive tackle	Houston	
5	145	Ron Merkerson	Linebacker	Colorado	
6	176	Harold Shaw	Fullback	Southern Miss	
7	211	Jason Andersen	Offensive guard	BYU	
Made roster

=== Undrafted free agents ===
1998 undrafted free agents of note
Player	Position	College
Terry Billups	Cornerback	North Carolina
Jeff Compas	Safety	Harvard
Matt Cox	Guard	BYU
Scott Dragos	Fullback	Boston College
Mike Geter	Running back	North Carolina
Blake Irwin	Linebacker	New Mexico
Brian Lee	Safety	Wyoming
Jim Murphy	Quarterback	Northeastern
Kato Serwanga	Cornerback	California

== Staff ==
1998 New England Patriots staff
Front office: Chairman/CEO – Robert Kraft; Vice president – Jonathan Kraft; Vice president of business operations – Andy Wasynczuk; Vice president of player personnel – Bobby Grier; Director of college scouting – Larry Cook; Director of pro scouting – Dave Uyrus; Assistant director of pro scouting – Andre Tippett; Head coaches: Head coach – Pete Carroll; Offensive coaches: Offensive coordinator – Ernie Zampese; Quarterbacks – Jack Reilly; Running backs – Kirby Wilson; Wide receivers – Steve Walters; Tight ends – Carl Smith; Offensive line – Paul Boudreau; Offensive line assistant – Jeff Davidson	Defensive coaches: Defensive coordinator – Steve Sidwell; Defensive line – Ray Hamilton; Linebackers – Bo Pelini; Defensive backs – Ron Lynn; Defensive assistant/secondary – DeWayne Walker; Special teams coaches: Special teams – Dante Scarnecchia; Strength and conditioning: Strength and conditioning – Johnny Parker

== Final roster ==
1998 New England Patriots roster
Quarterbacks (QB): 11 Drew Bledsoe; 7 Jim Murphy; 16 Scott Zolak; Running backs (RB): 30 Tony Carter FB; 29 Derrick Cullors; 47 Robert Edwards; 37 Chris Floyd FB; 44 Harold Shaw FB; 23 Sedrick Shaw; Wide receivers (WR): 80 Troy Brown; 84 Shawn Jefferson; 18 Anthony Ladd; 81 Tony Simmons; Tight ends (TE): 87 Ben Coates; 85 Lovett Purnell; 83 Rod Rutledge	Offensive linemen (OL): 67 Jason Andersen C; 78 Bruce Armstrong T; 61 Damon Denson G; 66 Ed Ellis T; 63 Heath Irwin G; 68 Max Lane T; 77 Zefross Moss T; 60 Scott Rehberg T; 71 Todd Rucci G; 64 Dave Wohlabaugh C; Defensive linemen (DL): 92 Ferric Collons DE; 90 Chad Eaton DT; 55 Willie McGinest DE; 75 Leonta Rheams DT; 94 Greg Spires DE; 74 Chris Sullivan DE; 95 Henry Thomas DT; 97 Mark Wheeler DT	Linebackers (LB): 54 Tedy Bruschi OLB; 59 Todd Collins OLB; 45 Dana Cottrell OLB; 99 Vernon Crawford OLB; 58 Marty Moore MLB; 53 Chris Slade OLB; 93 Shawn Stuckey MLB; Defensive backs (DB): 26 Chris Canty; 42 Chris Carter FS; 32 Willie Clay FS; 21 Steve Israel CB; 34 Tebucky Jones CB; 24 Ty Law CB; 36 Lawyer Milloy SS; 31 Kato Serwanga CB; 25 Larry Whigham FS; Special teams (ST): 86 Mike Bartrum LS; 19 Tom Tupa P; 4 Adam Vinatieri K	Practice squad: 10 Phil Dawson K; 91 James Grier DT; 15 Sir Mawn Wilson WR; Reserve: 82 Vincent Brisby WR (IR); 88 Terry Glenn WR (IR); 52 Ted Johnson LB (IR); 50 Ron Merkerson LB (IR); 96 Brandon Mitchell DE (IR); 51 Bernard Russ LB (IR); 72 Devin Wyman DT (IR); Rookies in italics 53 active, 7 reserve, 3 practice squad

== Regular season ==
=== Schedule ===
Week	Date	Opponent	Result	Record	Venue	Attendance
1	September 7	at Denver Broncos	**L** 21–27	0–1	Mile High Stadium	74,745
2	September 13	**Indianapolis Colts**	**W** 29–6	1–1	Foxboro Stadium	60,068
3	September 20	Tennessee Oilers	**W** 27–16	2–1	Foxboro Stadium	59,973
4	Bye					
5	October 4	at New Orleans Saints	**W** 30–27	3–1	Louisiana Superdome	56,172
6	October 11	Kansas City Chiefs	**W** 40–10	4–1	Foxboro Stadium	59,749
7	October 19	**New York Jets**	**L** 14–24	4–2	Foxboro Stadium	60,062
8	October 25	at **Miami Dolphins**	**L** 9–12 (OT)	4–3	Pro Player Stadium	73,973
9	November 1	at **Indianapolis Colts**	**W** 21–16	5–3	RCA Dome	58,056
10	November 8	Atlanta Falcons	**L** 10–41	5–4	Foxboro Stadium	59,790
11	November 15	at **Buffalo Bills**	**L** 10–13	5–5	Ralph Wilson Stadium	72,020
12	November 23	**Miami Dolphins**	**W** 26–23	6–5	Foxboro Stadium	58,729
13	November 29	**Buffalo Bills**	**W** 25–21	7–5	Foxboro Stadium	58,304
14	December 6	at Pittsburgh Steelers	**W** 23–9	8–5	Three Rivers Stadium	58,632
15	December 13	at St. Louis Rams	**L** 18–32	8–6	TWA Dome	48,946
16	December 20	San Francisco 49ers	**W** 24–21	9–6	Foxboro Stadium	59,153
17	December 27	at **New York Jets**	**L** 10–31	9–7	Giants Stadium	74,302
Note: Intra-division opponents are in **bold** text.

== Standings ==
AFC East
	W	L	T	PCT	PF	PA	STK
^{(2)} New York Jets	12	4	0	.750	416	266	W6
^{(4)} Miami Dolphins	10	6	0	.625	321	265	L1
^{(5)} Buffalo Bills	10	6	0	.625	400	333	W1
^{(6)} New England Patriots	9	7	0	.563	337	329	L1
Indianapolis Colts	3	13	0	.188	310	444	L2

== Playoffs ==
Round	Date	Opponent (seed)	Result	Record	Venue	Attendance
Wildcard	January 3, 1999	at Jacksonville Jaguars (3)	L 10–25	0–1	Alltel Stadium	71,139

== Notable games ==
- September 13 vs. Indianapolis Colts:

The Peyton Manning/New England Patriots rivalry kicked off with a 29–6 rout of Manning's Colts. Ty Law ran back a first-quarter interception 59 yards for the game's first touchdown, while Terry Glenn's three-yard catch and Robert Edwards' one-yard run went with three field goals by future Colt Adam Vinatieri for the Pats. Torrance Small caught a touchdown from Manning in the final five minutes for the only score by the Colts. Manning ended the day with three picks returned for 71 yards.

- September 20 vs. Tennessee Oilers:

In their final season using the team nickname "Oilers", the future Tennessee Titans put on a hard challenge for the Patriots, as Eddie George rushed for 100 yards and caught a 22-yard touchdown from Steve McNair. Al Del Greco and Adam Vinatieri exchanged field goals in the first half and the game lead tied or changed seven times before Lawyer Milloy picked off McNair for a 30-yard fourth-quarter touchdown sealing a 27–16 Patriots win.

- October 4 at New Orleans Saints:

Two seasons since losing Super Bowl XXXI in New Orleans the Patriots made their first trip to the Louisiana Superdome; coincidentally, the coach they were facing was the one who'd crushed them in Super Bowl XX in that same building – Mike Ditka. Drew Bledsoe overcame three interceptions and led the Patriots to a 27–24 lead in the game's final four minutes. On a Patriots punt Tebucky Jones of the Patriots tried to down the ball before it went into the endzone; Earl Little of the Saints grabbed it in the endzone but as he went to his knees his teammate Andre Hastings yanked it out of his hands and returned the kick 76 yards, setting up the tying field goal with 1:29 left in regulation. Bledsoe then led the Patriots downfield and Adam Vinatieri kicked the game-winning field goal with three seconds left in a 30–27 Patriots win.

- November 23 vs. Miami Dolphins:

Several days before this Monday Night Football matchup came word that team owner Robert Kraft had secured a stadium deal in Hartford, Connecticut for 2001 (a deal subsequently aborted when a deal to build Gillette Stadium was completed). Though the fanbase was displeased, their support for the team didn't waver even as the Patriots fell behind 23–19 with 3:22 left in the fourth after a Karim Abdul-Jabbar rushing touchdown. On the ensuing Patriots possession, Bledsoe completed a first-down pass on fourth and ten, but later broke the index finger on his throwing hand after striking Todd Rucci's helmet; on another fourth-and-ten on the Dolphins 35-yard-line coach Pete Carroll tried to call timeout, but the Patriots didn't see him and Bledsoe completed the first-down throw to Ben Coates. He then found Shawn Jefferson for the game-winning touchdown with 29 seconds remaining, in a 26–23 Patriots final score.

- November 29 vs. Buffalo Bills:

Local hero Doug Flutie made his first visit to Foxboro Stadium since his days as Patriots quarterback, where he'd won all five starts there. Directing the Bills he threw for 339 yards and rushed for 30 more, leading the Bills to a 21–17 lead in the game's final minute. From there, and despite still nursing a broken finger on his throwing hand, Drew Bledsoe led the Patriots downfield and completed a fourth-down throw to the Bills 26 to Shawn Jefferson with six seconds remaining. There was a referee conference after the play regarding the spot of the ball, at which point one of the referees was heard to say "just give it to them", in reference to the first down. Bledsoe threw for the endzone on the next play but the ball fell incomplete; the Bills were flagged for pass interference, extending the game by one untimed down, and from the one-yard line Bledsoe lofted a play-action pass to Ben Coates for the winning touchdown. The disgusted Bills (who felt Jefferson was out of bounds on the catch at the 26) went to the locker room even though the extra point still had to be kicked; Adam Vinatieri thus ran in an unopposed two-point conversion for a 25–21 Patriots win, the first career loss in Foxboro for Flutie. The NFL later stated that the game-extending pass interference call was an erroneous decision by the referees.

- December 13 at St. Louis Rams:

Drew Bledsoe's season ended in a 32–18 loss at St. Louis. Bledsoe played the entire game other than several series to get the splint on his broken finger replaced; he completed only 11 of 35 passes; a pass in the first quarter bounced off Lovett Purnell and was intercepted by Todd Lyght. Scott Zolak was sacked and fumbled to former Patriot Ray Agnew. The game was costly for both teams as Terry Glenn and Rams quarterback Tony Banks were lost to injuries.
