= David Richie =

American football player (born 1973)

No. 99, 94, 93, 95, 90
- Position: Defensive tackle

Personal information
- Born: September 26, 1973 (age 53); Orange, California, U.S.
- Listed height: 6 ft 4 in (1.93 m)
- Listed weight: 280 lb (127 kg)

Career information
- High school: Kelso (Kelso, Washington)
- College: Washington (1993–1996)
- NFL draft: 1997: undrafted

Career history
- Denver Broncos (1997); San Francisco 49ers (1998–1999); Jacksonville Jaguars (2000); Green Bay Packers (2000); Los Angeles Xtreme (2001)

Awards and highlights
- Super Bowl champion (XXXII); XFL champion (2001); Second-team All-Pac-10 (1996)

Career NFL statistics
- Tackles: 3
- Sacks: 0.5
- Stats at Pro Football Reference

David James Richie (born September 26, 1973) is an American former professional football player who was a defensive tackle for four seasons in the National Football League (NFL) with the Denver Broncos, San Francisco 49ers, and Jacksonville Jaguars. He played college football for the Washington Huskies. He was a member of the Broncos team that won Super Bowl XXXII. Richie also won the Million Dollar Game in the XFL as a member of the Los Angeles Xtreme.

== Early life and college ==
David James Richie was born on September 26, 1973, in Orange, California. He attended Kelso High School in Kelso, Washington.

He was a member of the Washington Huskies football team from 1993 to 1996. He was named second-team All-Pacific-10 Conference by the coaches his senior year in 1996.

== Professional career ==
After going undrafted in the 1997 NFL draft, Richie signed with the Denver Broncos on April 28, 1997. He played in two games for the Broncos during the 1997 season, recording 0.5 sacks. On January 25, 1998, the Broncos won Super Bowl XXXII against the Green Bay Packers.

On August 25, 1998, Richie and Steve Gordon were traded to the San Francisco 49ers for "past considerations". Richie played in the first five games of the 1998 season and was inactive for the following three games before being released by the 49ers on November 7. He was signed to the 49ers' practice squad on November 17. He was promoted back to the active roster on December 2 and played in three more games for the 49ers that season. He also appeared in one playoff game that year. Richie was released by the 49ers on September 21, 1999, after being inactive for the first two games of the 1999 season. He was later re-signed by the 49ers on December 8 and appeared in one game in 1999, posting one assisted tackle. He became a free agent after the 1999 season.

Richie was signed by the Jacksonville Jaguars on July 22, 2000. He was released on August 27, re-signed on August 30, and released again on September 27, 2000, after playing in one game for the Jaguars during the 2000 season.

Richie signed with the Green Bay Packers on December 6, 2000. He was released on December 12, 2000.

Richie played in five games, all starts, for the Los Angeles Xtreme of the XFL in 2001, recording 14 tackles and three sacks. On April 21, 2001, the Xtreme beat the San Francisco Demons in the Million Dollar Game to win the XFL championship.
