= José Cortez =

American football player (born 1975)

No. 2, 6, 8, 1
- Position: Placekicker

Personal information
- Born: May 27, 1975 (age 51); San Vicente, El Salvador
- Listed height: 5 ft 11 in (1.80 m)
- Listed weight: 200 lb (91 kg)

Career information
- High school: Van Nuys (Van Nuys, California, U.S.)
- College: Oregon State
- NFL draft: 1999: undrafted

Career history
- Cleveland Browns (1999)*; San Diego Chargers (1999)*; New York Giants (1999); San Diego Chargers (2000)*; Amsterdam Admirals (2000); Los Angeles Xtreme (2001); San Francisco 49ers (2001–2002); Washington Redskins (2002); Kansas City Chiefs (2003)*; Minnesota Vikings (2003, 2004); Dallas Cowboys (2005); Philadelphia Eagles (2005); San Francisco 49ers (2005); Indianapolis Colts (2005)
- * Offseason or practice squad member only

Awards and highlights
- XFL champion (2001); Million Dollar Game MVP (2001); Second-team All-Pac-10 (1998)

Career NFL statistics
- Games played: 55
- Field goals made: 53
- Field goals attempted: 74
- Field goal %: 71.6
- Longest field goal: 52
- Points: 258
- Stats at Pro Football Reference
- Stats at ArenaFan.com

José Antonio Cortez (born May 27, 1975) is a Salvadoran former professional football placekicker. He played for 10 National Football League (NFL) teams, as well as short stints in NFL Europe, the XFL, and the Arena Football League (AFL). His longest stints were two season stints with the San Francisco 49ers and Minnesota Vikings. He played college football at Oregon State University. He is the first Salvadoran to play in the NFL.

== Early life ==
Cortez arrived in the United States with his mother and younger sister at the age of 15, without any legal documents, to get away from the civil war ravaging his natal country. He reunited with his father and older sister, who were already living in Van Nuys, California.

He did not speak any English, when he first began attending Van Nuys High School. He was the goalkeeper of the soccer squad for two years, before trying out for the football team as a senior.

== College career ==
Cortez enrolled at Los Angeles Valley College, where he was both the kicker and punter. As a freshman in 1995, he contributed to the team winning the Community College Championship.

He transferred after his sophomore season to Oregon State University, where he was a two-year letterman. As a junior, he was named the starter at placekicker and received honorable-mention All-Pac-10 honors, after converting 11-of-19 field goal attempts (57.9%), with a long of 45 yards.

As a senior, he made 17-of-26 field goals (65.4%). Against California, he connected three field goals longer than 50 yards (50, 52, 55). He finished his college career after making 28-of-47 field goal attempts (62.2%).

== Professional career ==
=== Cleveland Browns ===
Cortez was signed as an undrafted free agent by the Cleveland Browns after the 1999 NFL draft, on April 23. He was waived after four preseason games on September 3.

=== San Diego Chargers ===
On September 14, he was signed by the San Diego Chargers. He was released on November 30.

=== New York Giants ===
On December 15, 1999, he was signed to the practice squad of the New York Giants . On December 17, he was promoted to the active roster. He played in one game with the Giants, where he had two kickoffs and did not attempt any field goals. He was released on December 22.

=== Amsterdam Admirals ===
In February 2000, he was signed by the San Diego Chargers and allocated to the Amsterdam Admirals of NFL Europe. Due to a rule requiring national players to kick short field goals, Cortez shared duties with Dutch soccer player Silvio Diliberto. He made 5-of-7 field goal attempts between 40 and 49 yards and tied for the league lead for most field goals made (9). He returned to the Chargers and was released before the start of the season on August 27.

=== Los Angeles Xtreme ===
In 2000, he was selected by the Los Angeles Xtreme with the 304th pick in the 2000 XFL Draft, reuniting with head coach Al Luginbill, who coached him with the Admirals. Although he missed 3 of his first 5 field goal attempts, he went on to make 13 of his next 14. Cortez, along with quarterback Tommy Maddox, contributed to the Xtreme having a 7–3 record and winning the XFL Championship. Cortez also led the league in scoring with 20 field goals and earned Most Valuable Player honors in the title game, after kicking four field goals.

=== San Francisco 49ers (first stint) ===
In 2001, Cortez's success in the XFL earned him a starting spot with the San Francisco 49ers, who signed him on April 26. He began the season by making 11 straight field goal attempts. He missed seven of his last 14 field goal attempts, including five that were blocked. He finished with 18-of-25 field goals (72%) and 47-of-47 extra points (100%).

In 2002, he had a streak of 13 field goals made at the start of the season. His problems began in the eighth game against the Oakland Raiders, missing a 27-yard field goal at the end of regulation, although the 49ers were able to win 23–20 in overtime, with Cortez redeeming himself with a 23-yard game-winning field goal. However, he would end up missing four field goal attempts in his last three games and was 50 percent (three of six) from 40 yards or more. In the tenth game against the San Diego Chargers, he missed a 41-yard field goal attempt in overtime, costing the 49ers a 17–20 loss. On November 26, he was cut after the game. He converted 18-of-24 field goal attempts (75%) in 10 games and was perfect on 25 extra-point attempts.

=== Washington Redskins ===
On December 2, 2002, he was signed by the Washington Redskins to replace kicker James Tuthill. He remained the rest of the season with the team, making 5-of-8 field goals (62.5%) and 9-of-9 extra points (100%).

=== Kansas City Chiefs ===
In 2003, he was signed by the Kansas City Chiefs. He was cut on August 25.

=== Minnesota Vikings ===
On October 17, 2003, he was signed by the Minnesota Vikings. On October 28, 2003, he was cut by the Vikings. In 2003, he was re-signed by the Vikings and kicked in the last two games of the season. On November 10, 2004, he was re-signed by the Vikings. He appeared in a total of 10 games in 2 seasons with the Vikings and only handled kickoffs.

=== Dallas Cowboys ===
On August 7, 2005, he was signed by the Dallas Cowboys to compete with Billy Cundiff for the starting job. He would end up making the team. On October 15, Cortez contributed to a 16–13 victory against the New York Giants by hitting a 45-yard field goal in overtime. He is mostly remembered by Cowboys fans for what happened in the third game against the San Francisco 49ers, when the struggling long snapper Jon Condo made an errant snap on an extra point attempt, which affected Cortez's timing and hooked the ball to the left side of the goal posts. While Cortez started mouthing off towards Condo, future hall of famer Larry Allen shoved his face mask and shifted his helmet towards the side. The Cowboys were still able to win 34–31. On October 23, he missed a 29-yard field goal in a 13–10 loss against the Seattle Seahawks. On October 24, he was released and replaced with rookie Shaun Suisham. Cortez made 12-of-16 field goals and was 3-of-6 on attempts longer than 40 yards.

=== Philadelphia Eagles ===
On October 25, 2005, he was claimed off waivers by the Philadelphia Eagles to handle kickoffs while David Akers recovered from an injury. He was released on November 22.

=== San Francisco 49ers (second stint) ===
On November 25, 2005, he signed with the San Francisco 49ers, to replace an injured Joe Nedney (groin). He was cut on December 6.

=== Indianapolis Colts ===
On December 21, 2005, he was signed by the Indianapolis Colts to handle the kickoffs for the rest of the season and allow Mike Vanderjagt to focus on only kicking field goals. On March 14, 2006, he was re-signed by the Colts. He was released on April 3.

== Career statistics ==
=== Regular season ===
			Kicking
Season	Team	League	GP	FGs	XPs	Pts.
1999	NYG	NFL	1	0	0	0
2001	Los Angeles	XFL	10	20	0*	60
2001	San Francisco	NFL	16	18	47	101
2002	Washington	NFL	14	23	34	103
2003	Minnesota	NFL	2	0	0	0
2004	Minnesota	NFL	8	0	0	0
2005	Dallas	NFL	7	12	13	49
2005	Philadelphia	NFL	4	0	3	3
2005	San Francisco	NFL	1	0	2	2
2005	Atlanta	NFL	2	0	0	0
NFL totals			55	53	99	258

* XFL rules prohibited extra-point kicks.

== Personal life ==
After retiring from the NFL, Cortez joined the Oregon State Police as a Trooper. Graduating from the Oregon State Police Academy in December 2007, he began patrol in May 2008, receiving his trooper stripes in January 2009.

Cortez was fired in 2013 after being sentenced to seven days in jail for official misconduct on the job. Cortez was accused of fondling a woman during a DUI stop. He also received one year of probation.
