= Jonathan Himebauch =

American football player and coach (born 1975)

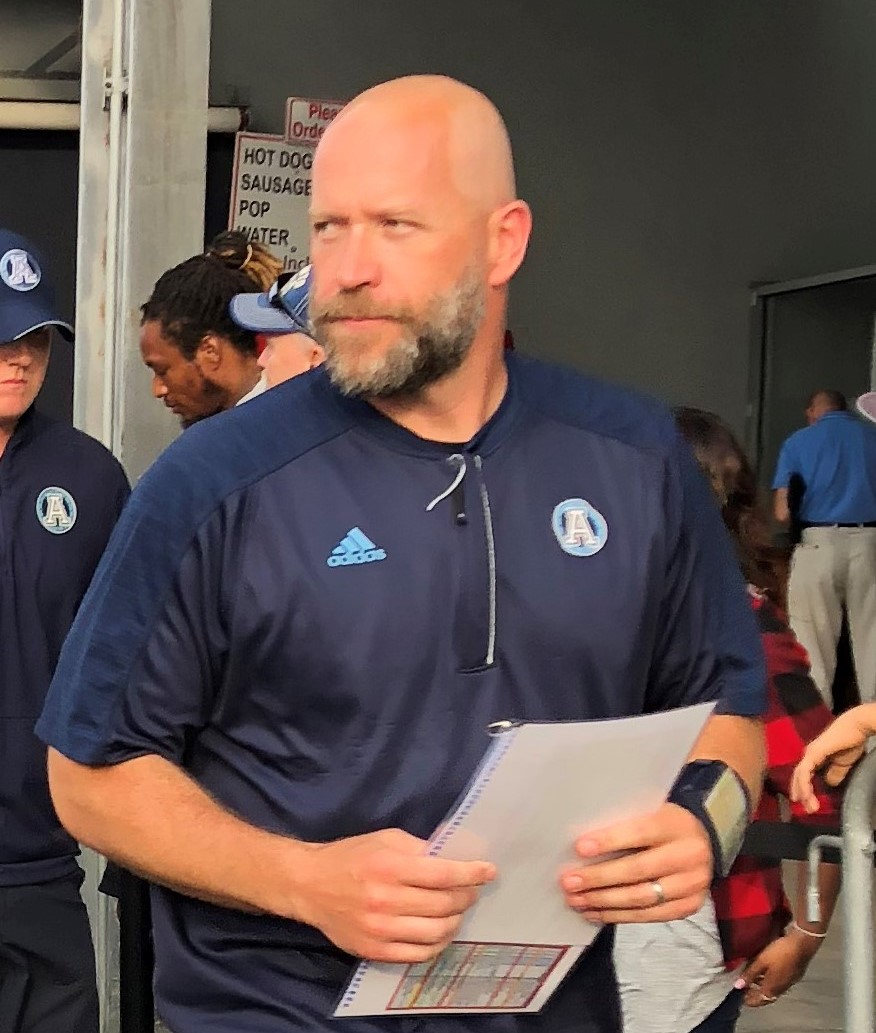
- Himebauch with the Toronto Argonauts in 2018

No. 61, 56
- Position: Center

Personal information
- Born: August 13, 1975 (age 51); Greenwich, Connecticut, U.S.
- Listed height: 6 ft 2 in (1.88 m)
- Listed weight: 295 lb (134 kg)

Career information
- High school: Damien (CA)
- College: USC
- NFL draft: 1998: undrafted

Career history

Playing
- Arizona Cardinals (1998)*; Rhein Fire (1999); Kansas City Chiefs (1999)*; Toronto Argonauts (1999); Los Angeles Xtreme (2001); Rhein Fire (2002)
- * Offseason or practice squad member only

Coaching
- Calgary Stampeders (2003) Offensive line coach; UNLV (2004) Offensive line coach; Harvard-Westlake School (2005) Head coach; San Diego State (2006–2008) Offensive line coach; Montreal Alouettes (2009–2011) Offensive line coach; Wake Forest (2012–2013) Offensive line coach; Edmonton Eskimos (2014) Offensive line coach; Toronto Argonauts (2015) Assistant cead coach/offensive line coach; Nevada (2016) Offensive line coach; Toronto Argonauts (2017–2018) Offensive line coach; San Antonio Commanders (2019) Offensive line coach; Tampa Bay Vipers (2020) Offensive line coach; Air Force (2020–2021) Tight ends coach; Birmingham Stallions (2022) Offensive line coach; Arlington Renegades (2023–2025) Offensive line coach/Co-special teams

Awards and highlights
- 3× Grey Cup champion (2009, 2010, 2017); 2× XFL champion (2001, 2023); USFL champion (2022)

Jonathan Himebauch (born August 13, 1975) is an American football coach and former center. He recently serves as the offensive line coach and co-special teams coordinator for the Dallas Renegades of the United Football League (UFL). He played college football at USC from 1993 to 1998 and played over parts of five years with various teams in different leagues.

== Early life ==
Jonathan Himebauch was born on August 13, 1975, in Greenwich, Connecticut.

== Playing career ==
He was an offensive lineman and co-captain at the University of Southern California from 1993 to 1998. Professionally, Himebauch was an NFL free agent Offensive Lineman with the Arizona Cardinals (1998), Kansas City Chiefs (1999). He also played for the Rhein Fire of NFL Europe (1999 and 2002) and Canadian Football League Toronto Argonauts (1999), along with the Los Angeles Xtreme of the XFL in (2001).

== Coaching career ==
Himebauch's first coaching experience as offensive line coach at Damien High School in La Verne, CA (1998) and Palos Verdes Peninsula High School (1999). He then moved to the collegiate ranks as Offensive Graduate Assistant at UNLV (2000–01). He was the offensive line coach at Santa Barbara City College (2002).

His first professional coaching experience was in the CFL for the Calgary Stampeders in 2003. He then returned to coach the Offensive Line for former USC and Los Angeles Rams head coach John Robinson at UNLV in 2004. Himebauch then took over as Head Coach for Harvard-Westlake School in North Hollywood, CA in 2005. Himebauch returned to the collegiate ranks to coach the Offensive Line at San Diego State University in 2006–2008. Himebauch then coached the offensive line for the Montreal Alouettes for head coach Marc Trestman through 2009–2011 where they won back-to-back Grey Cup Championships in 2009–2010. Himebauch went on to coach the offensive line at Wake Forest for Jim Grobe for the 2012–2013 seasons.

In 2014, Himebauch returned to the CFL with the Edmonton Eskimos. In 2015, he was promoted to assistant head coach and offensive line coach with the Toronto Argonauts. He eventually returned to the college ranks as the offensive line coach for Brian Polian at Nevada in 2016 before rejoining Toronto a year later.

In 2019, Himebauch joined Mike Riley's staff with the San Antonio Commanders of the Alliance of American Football as offensive line coach. On May 29, 2019, Himebauch was hired as the offensive line coach for the XFL's Tampa Bay Vipers; the hire reunited him with Trestman who had become the Vipers' head coach.

Himebauch joined the Air Force Academy as the Tight Ends coach in January 2020.

Himebauch has created his own training business 5asONE LLC that focuses on offensive line skill development, evaluation and recruitment. He also works with Nike at The Opening camps as lead offensive line coach for elite high school football players across the country.

Himebauch was officially hired by the Arlington Renegades on September 13, 2022 The Renegades won the 2023 XFL Championship, making Himebauch the first ever 2-time XFL champion.
