= Shawn Stuckey =

American football player (born 1975)

No. 93, 55, 53
- Position: Linebacker

Personal information
- Born: October 22, 1975 (age 50); Dale County, Alabama, U.S.
- Listed height: 6 ft 0 in (1.83 m)
- Listed weight: 230 lb (104 kg)

Career information
- High school: Daleville High School
- College: Vanderbilt University, Troy University

Career history
- 1998: Minnesota Vikings*
- 1998: New England Patriots
- 2000: Amsterdam Admirals
- 2000: Tampa Bay Buccaneers*
- 2001: Los Angeles Xtreme
- * Offseason or practice squad member only

Awards and highlights
- XFL champion (2001)
- Stats at Pro Football Reference

Shawn Demetrices Stuckey (born October 22, 1975) is an American former professional football linebacker who played in the National Football League (NFL) for the New England Patriots. He also played for the Amsterdam Admirals of NFL Europe and the Los Angeles Xtreme of the XFL.

== Early life and college ==
Stuckey is a native of Dale County, Alabama. He grew up in the town of Daleville, where he was raised by his single mother in public housing and relied on welfare and food stamps.

Stuckey played high school football at Daleville High School. He attended Vanderbilt University, majoring in cognitive studies, before transferring to Troy University, where he majored in marketing and business administration.

== Professional football career ==
Undrafted in the 1998 NFL draft, Stuckey signed with the Minnesota Vikings, where he was a member of the same rookie class as Randy Moss. After being released by the Vikings during training camp, Stuckey signed with the New England Patriots, where he made the team as a linebacker and wore jersey number 93. He started in six games and recovered a fumble during the 1998 season. He became the only free-agent rookie to start in the NFL playoffs that year, playing against the Jacksonville Jaguars.

Stuckey voluntarily left the Patriots at the beginning of the 1999 season to adopt his brother, who had faced legal trouble in Alabama. In his online autobiography, he stated that his "heart wasn't in the game". Financial concerns compelled Stuckey to return to professional football, and he signed with the Tampa Bay Buccaneers, who allocated him to the Amsterdam Admirals of NFL Europe in 2000. Stuckey was later placed on injured reserve by Tampa Bay due to an injury sustained with the Admirals.

After his recovery, Stuckey signed with the Los Angeles Xtreme of the XFL, playing on their 2001 championship team. During the season, he changed the name on the back of his jersey to "I Hate He Too" as a reference to Rod Smart's "He Hate Me" of the rival Las Vegas Outlaws.

He later played for the Indiana Firebirds of the Arena Football League before injuries forced him to retire from football. He attained over 21 high school, collegiate, and professional titles, including one XFL championship.

== Legal education and career ==
Following his football career, Stuckey attended The Citadel, where he worked on his Master of Business Administration (MBA) while serving as an assistant coach of the college's football team. In 2005, he graduated from the University of St. Thomas School of Law in Minneapolis, Minnesota.

In law school, Stuckey was co-chair of the legal department for the Saint Paul chapter of the NAACP. He testified before the United Nations in Geneva in February 2008, during the 72nd Convention on the Elimination of Racial Discrimination.
