= Ted Gill (gridiron football) =

American football coach (born 1948)

Personal information
- Born: October 3, 1948 (age 78); Washington, D.C., U.S.

Career information
- Positions: Linebacker, nose tackle
- High school: Bell Vocational (Washington, D.C.)
- College: College of the Sequoias, Idaho State

Career history
- Idaho State (1971–1973) (GA); Utah (1974–1976) (OL); New Mexico State (1977) (DL); Ball State (1978–1981) (DC/DL); Cornell (1982) (DC); Army (1983) (DL/LB); North Carolina (1984–1987) (DL/LB); Rice (1988–1989) (DL); Iowa (1990–1994) (DL/LB); Oklahoma State (1995) (DC); Carolina Panthers (1996–1998) (DL); Los Angeles Xtreme (2001) (DL); Montreal Alouettes (2002) (DC); Cincinnati (2003–2006) (DL); Michigan State (2007–2012) (DL)

Awards and highlights
- Grey Cup champion (2002); XFL champion (2001)

Ted Gill (born October 3, 1948) is an American former football coach.

== Early life ==
Ted Gill was born on October 3, 1948, in Washington, D.C. He attended Bell Vocational High School in Washington, D.C.

Gill played college football at the College of the Sequoias in 1968. He was then a two-year letterman at linebacker and nose tackle for the Idaho State Bengals from 1969 to 1970.

== Coaching career ==
Gill began his coaching career as a graduate assistant at Idaho State from 1971 to 1973. He was then the offensive line coach at Utah from 1974 to 1976, the defensive line coach at New Mexico State in 1977, the defensive coordinator and defensive line coach at Ball State from 1978 to 1981, the defensive coordinator at Cornell in 1982, the defensive line and linebackers coach at Army in 1983, the defensive line and linebackers coach at North Carolina from 1984 to 1987, the defensive line coach at Rice from 1988 to 1989, the defensive line and linebackers coach at Iowa from 1990 to 1994, and the defensive coordinator at Oklahoma State in 1995.

Gill moved to the professional ranks in 1996, serving as the defensive line coach for the Carolina Panthers of the National Football League from 1996 to 1998. He was the defensive line coach for the Los Angeles Xtreme of the XFL in 2001, and helped the Xtreme win the league championship (the Million Dollar Game). He served as the defensive coordinator for the Canadian Football League's Montreal Alouettes in 2002, and won the 90th Grey Cup.

Gill returned to the college ranks in 2003, serving as the defensive line coach at Cincinnati from 2003 to 2006. In 2007, he followed Cincinnati head coach Mark Dantonio to Michigan State, serving as the defensive line coach from 2007 to 2012. Gill's contract was not renewed for the 2013 season.

== Personal life ==
Gill graduated from Idaho State with a bachelor's degree in education in 1973.
