= Ken Oxendine =

American football player (born 1975)

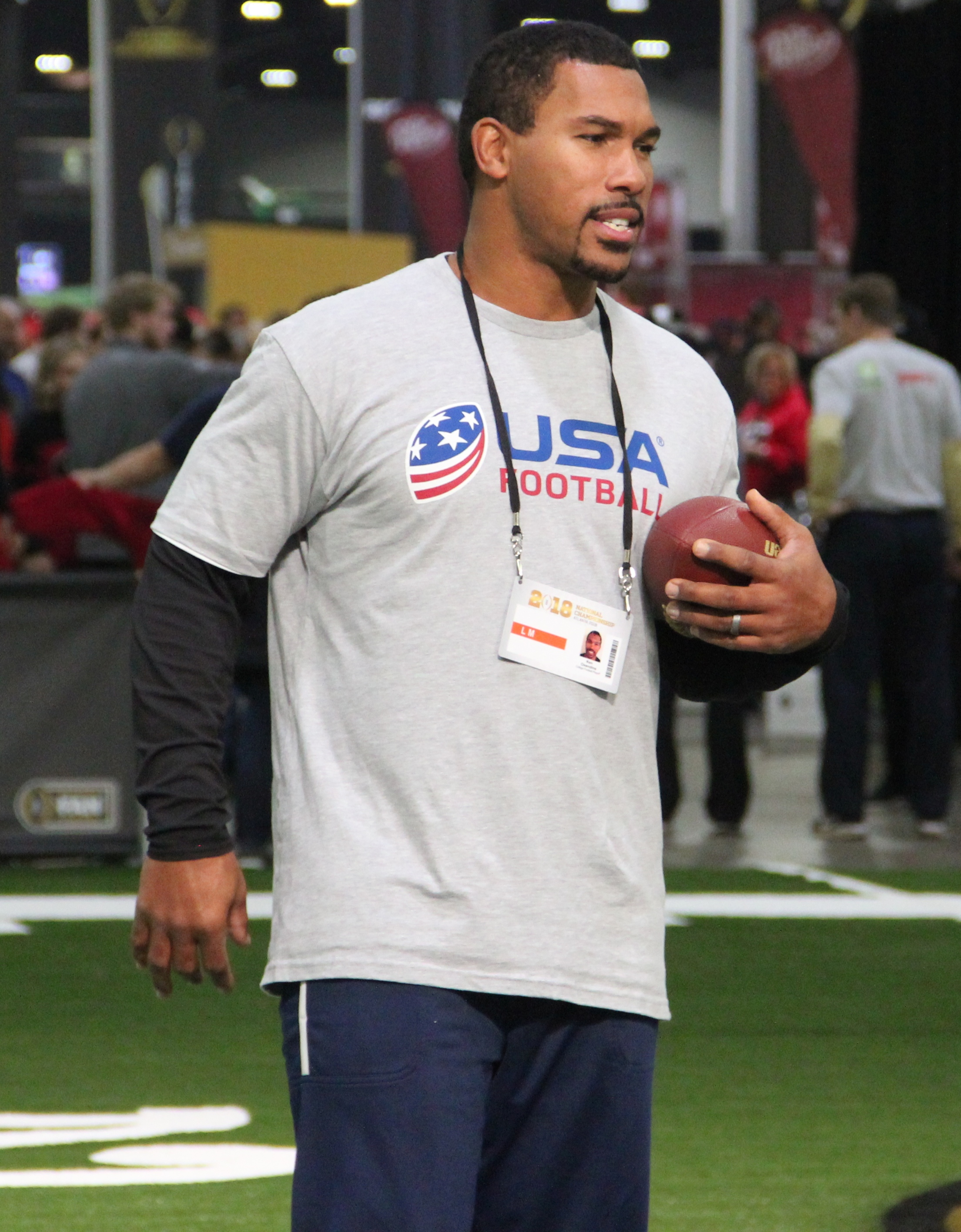
- Oxendine in 2018

No. 33, 28
- Position: Running back

Personal information
- Born: October 4, 1975 (age 51); Richmond, Virginia, U.S.
- Listed height: 6 ft 0 in (1.83 m)
- Listed weight: 230 lb (104 kg)

Career information
- High school: Thomas Dale (Chester, Virginia)
- College: Virginia Tech
- NFL draft: 1998: 7th round, 201st overall pick

Career history
- Atlanta Falcons (1998–1999); Detroit Lions (2000)*; Los Angeles Xtreme (2001)
- * Offseason or practice squad member only

Awards and highlights
- XFL champion (2001)

Career NFL statistics
- Rushing yards: 502
- Rushing average: 3.2
- Rushing touchdowns: 1
- Receptions: 18
- Receiving yards: 183
- Receiving touchdowns: 1
- Stats at Pro Football Reference

Kenneth Quarious Oxendine (born October 4, 1975) is an American former professional football player who was a running back for two seasons for the Atlanta Falcons of the National Football League (NFL) He was selected in the seventh round of the 1998 NFL draft with the 201st overall pick. After the NFL, he briefly played for the XFL's Los Angeles Xtreme during the 2001 season.

Oxendine played college football for the Virginia Tech Hokies. His senior year, despite splitting time with Lamont Pegues, Oxendine rushed for 904 yd (827 m) and eight touchdowns.

Following his football career, Oxendine became a physical education instructor. Since 2006, he has been teaching physical education at Notre Dame Academy in Duluth, Georgia. Ken is married to Mei-Ling Oxendine and they have two daughters.

Oxendine was raised in Chester, Virginia. He attended Curtis Elementary School, Chester Middle School, and was a graduate of Thomas Dale High School.
