= Tremayne Allen =

American football player

No. 49
- Position: Tight end

Personal information
- Born: Nashville, Tennessee, U.S.
- Listed height: 6 ft 2 in (1.88 m)
- Listed weight: 234 lb (106 kg)

Career information
- High school: Brentwood Academy
- College: Florida
- NFL draft: 1997: undrafted

Career history
- Chicago Bears (1997–1998); Los Angeles Xtreme (2001)

Awards and highlights
- XFL champion (2001); Bowl Alliance national champion (1996)
- Stats at Pro Football Reference

Tremayne Aubrey Allen is an American former professional football player who was a tight end for the Chicago Bears of the National Football League (NFL). He played college football for the Florida Gators. He also played in the XFL for the Los Angeles Xtreme.
