= Bobby Singh =

American and Canadian football player (born 1975)

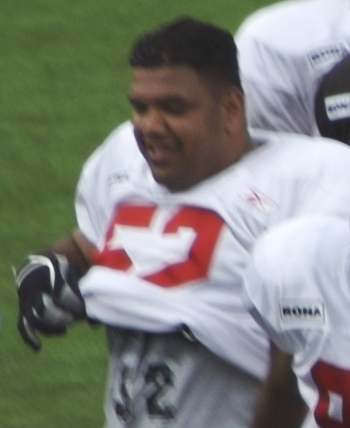
- Singh at Calgary Stampeders training camp in 2007

Profile
- Position: Guard

Personal information
- Born: November 21, 1975 (age 50); Suva, Fiji
- Listed height: 6 ft 4 in (1.93 m)
- Listed weight: 323 lb (147 kg)

Career information
- College: Hawaii; Portland State
- CFL draft: 1999: 1st round, 8th overall pick

Career history
- 1999: St. Louis Rams
- 2001: Los Angeles Xtreme
- 2002–2003: Calgary Stampeders
- 2004–2006: BC Lions
- 2007: Calgary Stampeders
- 2008: Winnipeg Blue Bombers
- 2009: BC Lions

Awards and highlights
- Grey Cup champion (2006)
- Stats at CFL.ca

Bobby Singh (born November 21, 1975) is a retired professional American and Canadian football guard. He was drafted by the Calgary Stampeders in the first round of the 1999 CFL draft. Singh has the distinction of being the only player in football history to have won an XFL Championship, a Super Bowl, and a Grey Cup.

== Early life ==
Singh was born in Fiji to parents Malkit and Mindy who are of Fijian Indian descent. The family moved to Richmond, British Columbia when Bobby was two years old. He attended Garden City Elementary School, Palmer Junior Secondary School, and Richmond Senior Secondary School. Throughout his school years, he was active in sports, including American football, basketball, and track and field.

== College career ==
After graduating from R.C. Palmer Secondary, he earned a full football scholarship to the University of Hawaii. He played sparingly in 1995, but in 1996 started eleven games for the Warriors and was named an all-WAC Conference Academic. He transferred to Portland State University in 1997, where he was named first-team All-Big Sky in his junior year, and All-American/All-Conference/Scholar Athlete of the Year in his senior year. He was a team captain for both his years at Portland State. He graduated with a degree in sociology.

== Professional career ==
Singh was drafted in the first round, eighth overall by the Calgary Stampeders in the 1999 Canadian College Draft. He signed as a free agent with the St. Louis Rams, winning a Super Bowl ring in Super Bowl XXXIV while on the Rams' practice roster. He underwent back surgery, was released after the season, and spent the 2000 season recovering. In 2001, he signed with the Los Angeles Xtreme of the XFL, playing in six regular season and two playoff games, and winning that league's first and only championship, the Million Dollar Game. He then signed with the San Diego Chargers, but was released at the end of training camp.

In 2002, he signed with the Calgary Stampeders of the Canadian Football League, becoming a starter by the fifth game of the season and playing in sixteen regular season games. After a strong season with Stampeders in 2003, he was named as a finalist for the CFL's Outstanding Canadian Award and CFL's Most Outstanding Offensive Lineman Award. Singh signed with the BC Lions in March 2004. During the 2004 season, he missed five games due to a triceps injury. He started all but two games of the 2005 season, including the Scotiabank West Championship (the CFL West Division final), which the Lions lost to the Edmonton Eskimos by the score of 28–23. Singh was the only member of a troubled Lions' offensive line—the team gave up a league-worst 74 sacks—who did not allow a sack, and was the Lions' 2005 nomination for Outstanding Lineman. In March 2006, Singh signed a four-year contract with the BC Lions. Singh dressed for twelve games in 2006, as well as the West Division final and Grey Cup, which the Lions won over the Montreal Alouettes 25–14, but missed six games due to injury and was used sparingly late in the season. He was released by the Lions on April 5, 2007. Lions head coach and general manager Wally Buono called it a "difficult decision" necessitated by the CFL's new salary cap, though Singh had offered to take a pay cut. Within a week, Singh had signed with his original CFL team, the Calgary Stampeders. Though he had entertained offers from the Winnipeg Blue Bombers and Toronto Argonauts, Calgary's proximity to Vancouver was a factor in his decision to sign with the Stampeders, and would allow him to fulfill his duties as school trustee. He was released by Calgary just prior to the 2008 CFL season, and was signed by Winnipeg on Sept. 18, 2008.

He was released by the Bombers on May 15, 2009.

Singh re-signed with the BC Lions on June 25, 2009.

== Personal life ==
Singh is involved in a variety of volunteer and community work in the Winnipeg area, such as youth football programmes and the Richmond Boys and Girls Club. In November 2005, he was elected to the Richmond School Board, taking the seventh and final School Trustee position with 9152 votes. He also started a security company, Xtreme Security Ltd., during the 2005-2006 off-season.

== Awards and honors ==
- Super Bowl XXXIV winner (as a member of the St. Louis Rams)
- 2001 XFL Million Dollar Game winner (as a member of the Los Angeles Xtreme)
- 2006 Grey Cup winner (as a member of the BC Lions)
