= Ricky Parker =

American football player (born 1974)

Dr. Ricky Parker
No. 27, 29, 39, 20
- Position: Defensive back

Personal information
- Born: December 4, 1974 (age 51); Burlington, Vermont, U.S.
- Listed height: 6 ft 0 in (1.83 m)
- Listed weight: 194 lb (88 kg)

Career information
- High school: Hiram W. Johnson (Sacramento, California)
- College: San Diego State (1993–1996)
- NFL draft: 1997: 6th round, 201st overall pick

Career history
- Chicago Bears (1997)*; Jacksonville Jaguars (1997); → Amsterdam Admirals (1998); Arizona Rattlers (2000–2004); Los Angeles Xtreme (2001); Georgia Force (2005–2006)
- * Offseason or practice squad member only

Awards and highlights
- XFL champion (2001)
- Stats at Pro Football Reference
- Stats at ArenaFan.com

Dr. Ricky Duwayne Parker (born December 4, 1974) is an American former professional football defensive back who played for the Jacksonville Jaguars of the National Football League (NFL). He played college football at San Diego State. He also played in NFL Europe, the XFL, and the Arena Football League (AFL).

== Early life ==
Ricky Duwayne Parker was born on December 4, 1974, in Burlington, Vermont. Parker's father Rudy was a minister, and his mother Beatrice was an IRS worker. Growing up, Parker was advised by his parents and brothers to avoid drugs and gangs; he instead played football and basketball as hobbies.

Parker played high school football at Hiram W. Johnson High School in Sacramento, California. He opened the 1990 season with a kickoff return touchdown in each of his first two games, of 80 and 85 yards in length respectively. In a 1991 game against El Dorado, he had what was considered "as complete a game as can be expected of a high school player" with a passing touchdown, a rushing touchdown, a kickoff return touchdown, an interception, and a fumble recovery. Against Rio Linda, he had a punt return touchdown and two rushing touchdowns. He was named the league Player of the Year for the 1991 season.

== College career ==
Parker played college football for the San Diego State Aztecs from 1993 to 1996. He was a four-year letterman and a three-year starter. In a September 1995 game against the Oklahoma Sooners, Parker set an Aztecs single-game record of 146 interception return yards, which he totaled from two interceptions; the previous record was 100. On the season, he led the Western Athletic Conference in interceptions (6), and led both the conference and all of NCAA in interception return yards (199).

During a 1996 game against Oklahoma, Parker set the Aztecs all-time record for interception return yards, having amassed a total of 313 at that point. Parker concluded his college football tenure with 10 interceptions for 355 yards and three touchdowns, and was the first Aztec player to be named to the All-WAC team three seasons in a row.

== Professional career ==
Parker was selected 201st overall in the 1997 NFL draft by the Chicago Bears in the sixth round. Bears head coach Dave Wannstedt drafted Parker on the recommendation of his good friend Ted Tollner who was Parker's college football coach at San Diego State. Parker was cut by the Bears midway through training camp in August 1997. He was signed to the practice squad of the Jacksonville Jaguars on September 8, 1997, and was promoted to the team's active roster on September 23. He played in 12 games overall for the Jaguars and posted one assisted tackle. In 1998, the Jaguars allocated Parker to NFL Europe to play for the Amsterdam Admirals. He was named the NFL Europe Defensive Player of the Week for his performance on May 23, 1998, against the Barcelona Dragons in which he recorded six tackles on defense, four pass breakups, and two special teams tackles while also returning a fumble 38 yards for a touchdown midway through the fourth quarter to help the Admirals win 20–17. He posted 47 defensive tackles and five special teams tackles overall for the Admirals during the 1998 season. He was released by Jacksonville on August 30, 1998.

Parker joined the Arizona Rattlers of the Arena Football League (AFL) in 2000, playing in three games. Although he was mostly a defensive specialist during his arena football career, he also spent some time on offense as the AFL played under ironman rules. He was placed on the Rattlers' exempt list in November 2000 after signing with the Los Angeles Xtreme of the XFL. Parker started all ten games for the Xtreme during the 2001 season, totaling 40 tackles and one punt return for 20 yards. He helped Los Angeles win the Million Dollar Game, the only championship game in league history. He returned to the Rattlers after the XFL folded. Parker competed in nine regular season games for Arizona in 2001; in the team's first playoff contest, he made an interception with 8:15 left on the clock to stop the Detroit Fury from mounting a comeback. Parker played for the Rattlers through the 2004 season, appearing in three straight ArenaBowls from 2002 to 2004 but losing each time. He finished his career with the AFL's Georgia Force from 2005 to 2006. Parker recorded AFL career totals of 219 solo tackles, 51 assisted tackles, 11 interceptions for 117 yards, 60 pass breakups, two forced fumbles, three fumble recoveries, 26 receptions for 256 yards and seven touchdowns, and five kick returns for 25 yards and one touchdown.

Dr. Ricky Parker grew up in Sacramento, California, where he graduated from Hiram Johnson High School in 1992. He then earned a football scholarship to San Diego State, where he played for four years and was All-Western Athletic Conference. He also received All-American Honors in his Junior and Senior years. The Chicago Bears drafted him in the sixth round of the 1997 draft. The following year, he played for the Jacksonville Jaguars and the Amsterdam Admirals in the NFL Europe League. He particularly enjoyed living in Amsterdam and traveling all across Europe during this period. After his time with the Jaguars, he played arena football for the Arizona Rattlers for six years while also playing in the XFL for the Los Angeles Xtreme. Finally, he played for the Georgia Force for two years before retiring to pursue other interests, including returning to school.

Ricky earned a Bachelor's degree in Sociology and a Master's in Interdisciplinary Studies from Arizona State University. He completed his Doctorate in General Psychology, with an emphasis in Performance Psychology, at Grand Canyon University and graduated in 2025. While transitioning between football teams, Ricky began coaching high school football in San Diego, and he resumed coaching high schoolers in Arizona while earning his Bachelor’s and Master’s degrees. At the same time, Ricky worked in education at a secondary behavioral school, where he was a behavioral coach for two years. During this time, Ricky discovered his passion for teaching and coaching youth. Drawn back to athletics, Ricky decided to pursue his doctorate in General Psychology with an emphasis on Performance Psychology, and he wrote his dissertation on how high school football coaches describe their experience with imposter phenomenon.

These days, his interests also include golfing, writing, producing music, networking, volunteering, offering speaking engagements, and connecting people. Dr. Parker's long-term professional interests include teaching and working with athletes and coaches to prepare their minds for performance and well-being. He hopes that his research will help individuals who want to learn more about imposter phenomenon.
