= Ramondo Stallings =

American football player (born 1971)

No. 79, 99, 97
- Position: Defensive end

Personal information
- Born: November 21, 1971 (age 54); Winston-Salem, North Carolina, U.S.
- Listed height: 6 ft 7 in (2.01 m)
- Listed weight: 286 lb (130 kg)

Career information
- High school: Ansonia (Ansonia, Connecticut)
- College: San Diego State (1990–1993)
- NFL draft: 1994: 7th round, 195th overall pick

Career history
- Cincinnati Bengals (1994–1998); BC Lions (2000); Edmonton Eskimos (2000); Los Angeles Xtreme (2001); Los Angeles Avengers (2001); Dallas Desperados (2002)

Awards and highlights
- XFL champion (2001)

Career NFL statistics
- Tackles: 38
- Sacks: 3
- Forced fumbles: 3
- Fumble recoveries: 1
- Stats at Pro Football Reference

Ramondo Antonio Stallings (born November 21, 1971) is an American former professional football player who was a defensive end for four seasons with the Cincinnati Bengals of the National Football League (NFL). He was selected by the Bengals in the seventh round of the 1994 NFL draft after playing college football for the San Diego State Aztecs. He was also a member of the BC Lions and Edmonton Eskimos of the Canadian Football League (CFL), the Los Angeles Xtreme of the XFL, and the Los Angeles Avengers and Dallas Desperados of the Arena Football League (AFL).

== Early life and college ==
Ramondo Antonio Stallings was born on November 21, 1971, in Winston-Salem, North Carolina. He played high school at Ansonia High School in Ansonia, Connecticut. He recorded 89 tackles his senior year, earning All-State honors.

Stallings was a four-year letterman for the San Diego State Aztecs of San Diego State University from 1990 to 1993. He was a two-year starter. He totaled 15 solo tackles, 12 assisted tackles, and two sacks as a freshman in 1990. Stallings posted seven solo tackles and six assisted tackles his senior season in 1993. He recorded college career totals of 41 solo tackles, 44 assisted tackles and six sacks.

== Professional career ==
Stallings was selected by the Cincinnati Bengals in the seventh round, with the 195th overall pick, of the 1994 NFL draft. He officially signed with the team on June 2. He was released on August 23 and signed to the team's practice squad on August 30. Stallings was promoted to the active roster on November 8, 1994, and played in six games for the Bengals during the 1994 season, posting one solo tackle. He appeared in 13 games, starting two, in 1995, recording 14 solo tackles, two assisted tackles, one sack, one fumble recovery, one forced fumble, and one fumble. He played in 13 games for the second consecutive season, starting three, in 1996, totaling 13 solo tackles, two assisted tackles, two sacks, and two forced fumbles. Stallings became a free agent after the 1996 season and re-signed with the Bengals on April 2, 1997. He appeared in six games in 1997 and posted six solo tackles before being placed on injured reserve on December 1, 1997. He was placed on the reserve/physically unable to perform list on August 25, 1998, and was later released on October 7, 1998.

Stallings signed with the BC Lions of the Canadian Football League (CFL) on April 11, 2000. He dressed in three games for the Lions, recording two tackles and three sacks, before being released on September 14, 2000.

Stallings was then signed by the CFL's Edmonton Eskimos on September 21, 2000. He dressed in five games for the Eskimos during the 2000 season, posting eight tackles and two sacks. He was released on October 26, 2000.

Stallings played in all ten games, starting one, for the Los Angeles Xtreme of the XFL in 2001, accumulating 11 tackles and four sacks. The Xtreme finished the season with a 7–3 record. On April 21, 2001, the Xtreme beat the San Francisco Demons by a score of 38–6 in the Million Dollar Game, winning the XFL championship.

On April 30, 2001, Stallings signed with the Los Angeles Avengers of the Arena Football League (AFL). He played in one game for the Avengers before being placed on injured reserve on May 11, 2001.

On December 4, 2001, Stallings was selected by the Dallas Desperados with the first overall pick in the 2002 AFL expansion draft. He signed with the Desperados on January 8, 2002. He was waived on April 15, 2002.

== Personal life ==
Stallings has spent time as a personal trainer.
