= Frank Leatherwood =

American football player (born 1977)

No. 46, 39
- Positions: Fullback, tight end

Personal information
- Born: August 15, 1977 (age 49); Clyde, North Carolina, U.S.
- Listed height: 6 ft 2 in (1.88 m)
- Listed weight: 260 lb (118 kg)

Career information
- High school: Pisgah (Canton, North Carolina)
- College: Appalachian State
- NFL draft: 1999: undrafted

Career history
- Miami Dolphins (1999–2000)*; Amsterdam Admirals (2000); Chicago Bears (2000)*; Los Angeles Xtreme (2001); Georgia Force (2002)*; Detroit Fury (2003)
- * Offseason or practice squad member only

Awards and highlights
- XFL champion (2001)
- Stats at ArenaFan.com

Frank Leatherwood (born August 15, 1977) is an American former professional football fullback who played one season with the Detroit Fury of the Arena Football League (AFL). He played college football at Appalachian State.

== Early life ==
Leatherwood lettered in baseball and football for the Pisgah High School Black Bears of Canton, North Carolina.

== College career ==
Leatherwood played for the Appalachian State Mountaineers of Appalachian State University from 1995 to 1998. He earned first team All-Southland Conference honors his senior year, compiling 28 receptions for 364 yards and one touchdown. He recorded 83 receptions for 1,036 yards and 15 touchdowns during his college career.

== Professional career ==
Leatherwood signed with the Miami Dolphins of the National Football League (NFL) on April 19, 1999 after going undrafted in the 1999 NFL draft. He spent the 1999 season on the team's practice squad. He was allocated to NFL Europe to play for the Amsterdam Admirals in 2000, totaling 23 receptions for 251 yards and one touchdown. Leatherwood was released by the Dolphins on August 27, 2000. He was drafted by the Los Angeles Xtreme with the 128th pick in the 2001 XFL draft. He played for them in 2001, winning the Million Dollar Game. Leatherwood signed with the Georgia Force, but was waived on March 24, 2002. Leatherwood signed with the Detroit Fury on October 30, 2002. He was released by the Fury on December 8, 2003.
