= Josh Wilcox =

American football player (born 1974)

No. 44, 47
- Position: Tight end

Personal information
- Born: June 5, 1974 (age 52); Eugene, Oregon, U.S.
- Listed height: 6 ft 2 in (1.88 m)
- Listed weight: 253 lb (115 kg)

Career information
- High school: Junction City (Junction City, Oregon)
- College: Oregon (1992–1996)
- NFL draft: 1997: undrafted

Career history
- Minnesota Vikings (1997)*; Portland Forest Dragons (1998); Amsterdam Admirals (1998); New Orleans Saints (1998–1999); Los Angeles Xtreme (2001)
- * Offseason or practice squad member only

Awards and highlights
- XFL champion (2001)

Career NFL statistics
- Receptions: 7
- Receiving yards: 71
- Stats at Pro Football Reference
- Stats at ArenaFan.com

Joshua David Wilcox (born June 5, 1974) is an American former professional football player who was a tight end for two seasons with the New Orleans Saints of the National Football League (NFL). He played college football for the Oregon Ducks. Wilcox also played for the Amsterdam Admirals of NFL Europe, the Portland Forest Dragons of the Arena Football League (AFL), and the Los Angeles Xtreme of the XFL.

== Early life ==
Joshua David Wilcox was born on June 5, 1974, in Eugene, Oregon. He attended Junction High School in Junction City, Oregon. He was a letterman in football, basketball, and track in high school.

== College career ==
Wilcox played college football for the Ducks of the University of Oregon. He redshirted the 1992 season, was a four-year letterman from 1993 to 1996, and a three-year starter from 1994 to 1996. He caught nine passes for 107 yards and one touchdown in 1993, 19 passes for 293 yards and five touchdowns in 1994, 34 passes for 439 yards and five touchdowns in 1995, and 28 passes for 425 yards and three touchdowns in 1996. He made 11 catches for 135 yards and one touchdown in the 1995 Rose Bowl, tying Oregon's single-game receptions record.

== Professional football career ==
Wilcox signed with the Minnesota Vikings on April 25, 1997, after going undrafted in the 1997 NFL draft. He was released by the Vikings on August 12, 1997.

In October 1997, Wilcox signed with the Portland Forest Dragons of the Arena Football League (AFL) for the 1998 season. In March 1998, he was put on Portland's exempt list so that he could join the Amsterdam Admirals of NFL Europe. He recorded nine receptions for 151 yards and one special teams tackle for the Admirals during the 1998 NFL Europe season. Wilcox then returned to the Forest Dragons and played in three games for them during the 1998 AFL season, totaling seven solo tackles, two assisted tackles, and one forced fumble. He was a fullback/linebacker during his time in the AFL as the league played under ironman rules.

Wilcox was signed by the New Orleans Saints on July 24, 1998. He was released on August 31 but signed to the team's practice squad the next day. He was promoted to the active roster on December 9. Wilcox played in three games, starting one, for the Saints in 1998 and caught one pass for ten yards on one target. He appeared in eight games, starting four, during the 1999 season, catching six passes for 61 yards on seven targets. He became a free agent after the 1999 season.

In October 2000, Wilcox was selected by the Los Angeles Xtreme in the 15th round, with the 113th overall pick, of the 2001 XFL draft. He played in all ten games, starting three, for the Xtreme in 2001, totaling two receptions for ten yards and a touchdown. The Xtreme finished the season with a 7–3 record and won the XFL championship against the San Francisco Demons by a score of 38–6.

== Professional wrestling career ==
Wilcox also spent time as a professional wrestler, wrestling several matches from 1997 to 2001. He teamed with Tommy Dreamer in a losing effort against Rhino and Steve Corino on the January 22, 2000, episode of ECW on TNN.

== Personal life ==
Wilcox is the son of Pro Football Hall of Famer Dave Wilcox, brother of former California Golden Bears head coach Justin Wilcox, and nephew of NFL player John Wilcox.

== See also ==
- List of gridiron football players who became professional wrestlers
