= Los Angeles Xtreme =

American professional football team

Logo

General information
- Founded: 2001
- Folded: 2001; 25 years ago
- Stadium: Los Angeles Memorial Coliseum
- Headquartered: Los Angeles, California
- Colors: Navy, gold, silver, white

Personnel
- Head coach: Al Luginbill

League / conference affiliations
- XFL; Western Division

Championships
- League championships: 1 Million Dollar Game (2001)
- Division championships: 1 (2001)

The Los Angeles Xtreme was a professional American football team based in Los Angeles, California. The team was a member of the original version of the XFL, begun by Vince McMahon of World Wrestling Entertainment and by NBC, a major television network in the United States. The team played its home games in the Los Angeles Memorial Coliseum in the spring of 2001. They were in the XFL's Western Division with the San Francisco Demons, the Memphis Maniax, and the Las Vegas Outlaws. The team had the league's best passing offense and was nicknamed "L.A.X." as a pun on the IATA code for Los Angeles International Airport. They finished the season in 1st place with a 7–3 record and defeated the Chicago Enforcers in the Playoffs and the San Francisco Demons in the Million Dollar Game with a score of 38–6 to win the league's sole Championship.

== History ==
The LA Xtreme were the sole champions of the original XFL because NBC dropped the XFL concept after the first season due to dismal ratings. Shortly after this, McMahon announced that the league would be dissolved. However, the Xtreme's quarterback, Tommy Maddox, subsequently caught on with the Pittsburgh Steelers of the National Football League, later leading them into the playoffs in 2002 and winning a Super Bowl ring in 2005. Maddox also won the XFL's Most Valuable Player award. Jeremaine Copeland has achieved success in the CFL with the Montreal Alouettes, the Calgary Stampeders, and the Toronto Argonauts winning two Grey Cup championships.

=== Revival ===
In December 2018, a revival of the XFL announced its intention to return to Los Angeles. The new team was named the Los Angeles Wildcats, but would cease operations due to the COVID-19 pandemic; they would not return when the league was reactivated in 2023.

== Season-by-season ==
Season records
Season	W	L	T	Finish	Playoff results
2001	7	3	0	1st Western	Won Semifinals (Chicago); Won Million Dollar Game (San Francisco)
Totals	9	3	0	(including playoffs)	

=== Schedule ===
==== Regular season ====
Week	Date	Opponent	Result	Record	Venue	Attendance
1	February 4	at San Francisco Demons	L 13–15	0–1	Pacific Bell Park	38,253
2	February 10	Chicago Enforcers	W 39–32 (2 OT)	1–1	Los Angeles Memorial Coliseum	35,813
3	February 17	at Las Vegas Outlaws	W 12–9	2–1	Sam Boyd Stadium	26,135
4	February 25	Memphis Maniax	L 12–18	2–2	Los Angeles Memorial Coliseum	18,341
5	March 3	at New York/New Jersey Hitmen	W 22–7	3–2	Giants Stadium	27,479
6	March 11	at Birmingham Thunderbolts	W 35–26	4–2	Legion Field	11,197
7	March 18	Orlando Rage	W 31–6	5–2	Los Angeles Memorial Coliseum	20,382
8	March 24	Las Vegas Outlaws	W 35–26	6–2	Los Angeles Memorial Coliseum	20,738
9	April 1	at Memphis Maniax	L 12–27	6–3	Liberty Bowl Memorial Stadium	21,191
10	April 7	San Francisco Demons	W 24–0	7–3	Los Angeles Memorial Coliseum	18,121

==== Post-season ====
Round	Date	Opponent	Result	Record	Venue	Attendance
Semi-final	April 15	Chicago Enforcers	W 33–16	1–0	Los Angeles Memorial Coliseum	13,081
Championship	April 21	San Francisco Demons	W 38–6	2–0	Los Angeles Memorial Coliseum	24,153

== Standings ==
Western Division
Team	W	L	T	PCT	PF	PA	STK
Los Angeles Xtreme	7	3	0	.700	235	166	W1
San Francisco Demons	5	5	0	.500	156	161	L1
Memphis Maniax	5	5	0	.500	167	166	W2
Las Vegas Outlaws	4	6	0	.400	169	143	L3

== Personnel ==
=== Staff ===
2001 Los Angeles Xtreme staff
Front office: Vice president and general manager – J. K. McKay; Director of player personnel – Al Tanara; Head coaches: Head coach – Al Luginbill; Offensive coaches: Offensive coordinator – Jim Barker; Quarterbacks backs – Tom Luginbill; Running backs – Ken Stills; Wide receivers – Marc Lunsford; Offensive line – Dave Levy	Defensive coaches: Defensive coordinator – Jim Hilles; Defensive line – Ted Gill; Special teams coaches: Special teams – Chris Allen

=== Roster ===
2001 Los Angeles Xtreme roster
Quarterbacks (QB): 8 Tommy Maddox; 13 Scott Milanovich; Running backs (RB): 39 Frank Leatherwood; 24 Saladin McCullough; 22 Rashaan Shehee; Wide receivers (WR): 86 Jeremaine Copeland; 15 Damon Dunn; 81 Damon Gibson; 80 Darnell McDonald; 82 Latario Rachal; Tight ends (TE): 47 Josh Wilcox	Offensive linemen (OL): 64 Chris Brymer G; 69 Jerry Crafts T; 56 Jonathan Himebauch C; 78 Nate Miller G; 76 Jose Portilla T; 77 Bobby Singh G; 65 Scott Whittaker T; Defensive linemen (DL): 96 Jamal Duff DE; 93 Curtis Eason DT; 27 Eric Johnson DE; 75 Matt Keneley DT; 94 Chad Pegues DT; David Richie DE; 71 Ramondo Stallings DE	Linebackers (LB): 46 Juan Long; 51 Rico Mack; 53 Shawn Stuckey; Defensive backs (DB): 60 Clifton Abraham; 21 Ron Carpenter S; 21 Reggie Durden; 45 Leomont Evans; Tinker Keck; 26 Dell McGee CB; 29 Ricky Parker; 20 Jeff Russell CB; Special teams (ST): 1 José Cortéz K; 14 Noel Prefontaine	Practice squad: 60 Bruce Beaton G; Cedric Harden DE; 50 Errick Herrin LB; 28 Ken Oxendine RB; 4 Larry Ryans WR; Jason Shelly WR; Alan Jones WR; Reserve: 42 Tremayne Allen TE; 55 Brendon Ayanbadejo LB; 25 Terry Billups DB; 32 Donnell Day DB; 7 Todd Doxzon WR; Rookies in italics, 6 practice squad

=== Game summaries ===
==== Week 1: at San Francisco Demons ====
Week 1: Los Angeles Xtreme at San Francisco Demons – Game summary

Quarter	1	2	3	4	Total
Xtreme	0	7	0	6	13
Demons	6	0	0	9	15

at Pacific Bell Park, San Francisco, California

- Date: February 4
- Game time: 3:30 p.m.
- Game weather: Sunny, 73 °F (23 °C)
- Game attendance: 38,253
- TV announcers (UPN): Chris Marlowe, Brian Bosworth, Chris Wragge and Michael Barkann
- Boxscore

Game information

First quarter

- SF – Vaughn Dunbar 3-yard pass from Mike Pawlawski (Mike Pawlawski pass failed), 3:31. Demons 6–0. Drive: 12 plays, 39 yards, 6:13.

Second quarter

- LA – Darnell McDonald 28-pass from Tommy Maddox (Rashaan Shehee run for conversion), :38. Xtreme 7–6. Drive: 6 plays, 40 yards, 3:20.

Third quarter

- No scoring plays.

Fourth quarter

- LA – José Cortez 35-yard field goal, 12:23. Xtreme 10–6. Drive: 6 plays, 38 yards, 2:28.
- SF – Calvin Schexnayder 32-yard pass from Mike Pawlawski (Mike Pawlawski pass failed), 10:03. Demons 12–10. Drive: 6 plays, 60 yards, 2:44.
- LA – José Cortez 25-yard field goal, 3:55. Xtreme 13–12. Drive: 4 plays, 5 yards, 1:33.
- SF – Mike Panasuk 33-yard field goal, :00. Demons 15–13. Drive: 11 plays, 58 yards, 3:55.

Top passers

- LA – Tommy Maddox – 15/27, 164 yards, TD, INT
- SF – Mike Pawlawski – 31/47, 288 yards, 2 TD

Top rushers

- LA – Rashaan Shehee – 13 rushes, 37 yards
- SF – Jimmy Cunningham – 1 rush, 27 yards

Top receivers

- LA – Jeremaine Copeland – 6 receptions, 59 yards
- SF – Brian Roberson – 12 receptions, 127 yards

==== Week 2: vs. Chicago Enforcers ====
Week 2: Chicago Enforcers at Los Angeles Xtreme – Game summary

Quarter	1	2	3	4	OT	2OT	Total
Enforcers	12	13	0	0	7	0	32
Xtreme	6	7	0	12	7	7	39

at Los Angeles Memorial Coliseum, Los Angeles, California

- Date: February 10
- Game time: 5:00 p.m.
- Game attendance: 35,813
- TV announcers (NBC): Jim Ross, Jesse Ventura, Mike Adamle and Fred Roggin
- Boxscore

Game information

First quarter

- CHI – John Avery 28-yard run (Tim Lester pass failed), 12:00. Enforcers 6–0. Drive: 3 plays, 83 yards, 1:50.
- LA – Tommy Maddox 1-yard run (Tommy Maddox pass failed), 5:54. Tied 6–6. Drive: 13 plays, 79 yards, 6:00.
- CHI – Aaron Bailey 46-yard pass from Tim Lester (Tim Lester sacked), 5:10. Enforcers 12–6. Drive: 3 plays, 61 yards, :59.

Second quarter

- CHI – Brian Rogers 2-yard blocked punt return (LeShon Johnson run failed), 6:07 Enforcers 18–6.
- LA – Darnell McDonald 15-pass from Tommy Maddox (Ken Oxendine run for conversion), 3:45. Enforcers 18–13. Drive: 1 play, 15 yards, :07.
- CHI – LeShon Johnson 1-yard run (LeShon Johnson run for conversion), 1:13. Enforcers 25–13. Drive: 5 plays, 70 yards, 2:22.

Third quarter

- No scoring plays.

Fourth quarter

- LA – Damon Dunn 8-yard pass from Tommy Maddox (Tommy Maddox pass failed), 2:43. Enforcers 25–19. Drive: 10 plays, 75 yards, 4:05.
- LA – Ken Oxendine 1-yard run (Tommy Maddox pass failed), :29. Tied 25–25. Drive: 9 plays, 49 yards, 1:09.

Overtime

- CHI – John Avery 2-yard pass from Tim Lester (Tim Lester run for conversion). Enforcers 32–25. Drive: 3 plays, 20 yards.
- LA – Jeremaine Copeland 20-yard pass from Tommy Maddox (Jermaine Copeland pass from Tommy Maddox) Tied 32–32. Drive: 3 plays, 20 yards.
- LA – Darnell McDonald 20-yard pass from Tommy Maddox (Ken Oxendine run for conversion) Xtreme 39–32. Drive: 3 plays, 20 yards.

Top passers

- CHI – Tim Lester – 11/19, 220 yards, 2 TD
- LA – Tommy Maddox – 38/65, 412 yards, 3 TD, 2 INT

Top rushers

- CHI – John Avery – 5 rushes, 69 yards, TD
- LA – Rashaan Shehee – 8 rushes, 36 yards

Top receivers

- CHI – John Avery – 3 receptions, 84 yards, TD
- LA – Jeremaine Copeland – 17 receptions, 190 yards, TD

== Other notable figures ==
- Bonnie-Jill Laflin – One of the team's cheerleaders is now a scout for the Los Angeles Lakers and a co-general manager of a minor league affiliate, the Los Angeles D-Fenders.
- Super Dave Osborne – The actor and stuntman was the sideline reporter on the radio broadcasts of the team on KLSX. The booth announcers were Geoff Nathanson and Craig Fertig (Fertig died in 2008).

== Statistical leaders ==
Legend
Led the league

=== Passing ===
Passing statistics (Note: Copeland threw one incompletion.)
NAME	GP	GS	Record	Cmp	Att	Pct	Yds	TD	Int	Rtg
Tommy Maddox	10	10	7–3	196	342	57.3	2,186	18	9	83.1
Scott Milanovich	4	0	—	2	9	22.2	45	0	1	8.3
Totals	10	10	7–3	198	352	56.3	2,231	18	10	80.6

=== Rushing ===
Rushing statistics
NAME	Att	Yds	Avg	Lng	TD
Saladin McCullough	88	384	4.4	22	5
Rashaan Shehee	61	242	4.0	28	0
Ken Oxendine	34	76	2.2	7	1
Tommy Maddox	15	27	1.8	10	2
Noel Prefontaine	1	10	10.0	10t	1
Josh Wilcox	2	5	2.5	3	0
Scott Milanovich	5	-15	-3.0	-2	0
Totals	206	729	3.5	28	9

=== Receiving ===
Receiving statistics
NAME	Rec	Yds	Avg	Lng	TD
Jeremaine Copeland	67	755	11.3	34	5
Darnell McDonald	34	456	14.4	39	8
Latario Rachal	24	254	10.6	24	0
Damon Gibson	16	257	16.1	58t	1
Saladin McCullough	14	77	5.5	19t	1
Larry Ryans	11	115	10.5	20	0
Damon Dunn	10	151	15.1	63	1
Frank Leatherwood	9	78	8.7	14	1
Rashaan Shehee	6	25	4.2	16	0
Ken Oxendine	5	53	10.6	23	0
Josh Wilcox	2	10	5.0	5t	1
Totals	198	2,231	11.3	63	18
