= Saladin McCullough =

American gridiron football player (born 1975)

No. 33, 24, 25
- Position: Running back

Personal information
- Born: July 17, 1975 (age 51); Monterey Park, California, U.S.
- Listed height: 5 ft 9 in (1.75 m)
- Listed weight: 200 lb (91 kg)

Career information
- High school: John Muir (Pasadena, California)
- College: Oregon
- NFL draft: 1998: undrafted

Career history
- Edmonton Eskimos (1999); Los Angeles Dragons (2000); Los Angeles Xtreme (2001); San Francisco 49ers (2002)*; Calgary Stampeders (2003); Saskatchewan Roughriders (2004)
- * Offseason or practice squad member only

Awards and highlights
- XFL champion (2001); Second-team All-Pac-10 (1997)
- Stats at CFL.ca (archive)

Saladin McCullough (born July 17, 1975) is an American former professional football running back who played three seasons in the Canadian Football League (CFL) with the Edmonton Eskimos, Calgary Stampeders and Saskatchewan Roughriders. He first enrolled at Pasadena City College before transferring to El Camino Junior College and lastly the University of Oregon. McCullough was also a member of the Los Angeles Dragons and Los Angeles Xtreme. His brother Sultan McCullough played in the NFL for the Washington Redskins.

== Early life ==
McCullough played high school football at John Muir High School in Pasadena, California. He set career school records by accumulating 4,429 rushing yards, 73 touchdowns and 5,748 all-purpose yards.

== College career ==
McCullough played for the Pasadena City Lancers of Pasadena City College in 1994, recording 725 yards and six touchdowns in seven games. He played for the El Camino Junior College Warriors in 1995, rushing for 1,090 yards and 12 touchdowns in ten games with 8.4 yards per carry.

McCullough played for the Oregon Ducks of the University of Oregon from 1996 to 1997. He set a school record for rushing touchdowns by scoring fifteen in seven games in 1996, earning honorable mention All-Pac-10 accolades. He recorded 1,193 rushing yards on 250 carries his senior year in 1997. McCullough also scored a 93-yard return for a touchdown on the first kickoff of the Ducks' 1997 season.

== Professional career ==
McCullough played in one game for the Edmonton Eskimos during the 1999 season. He played for the Los Angeles Dragons of the Spring Football League in 2000. McCullough was selected by the Los Angeles Xtreme with the 464th pick in XFL draft. He recorded five rushing touchdowns and one receiving touchdown for the Extreme in 2001. McCullough played in thirteen games for the Calgary Stampeders in 2003, recording 734 rushing yards and three touchdowns. He also accumulated 298 receiving yards on 32 receptions. McCullough played in one game for the Saskatchewan Roughriders during the 2004 season. He spent the pre season with the San Francisco 49ers in 2002, but was released.
