= Latario Rachal =

American football player (born 1974)

No. 85
- Positions: Wide receiver, return specialist

Personal information
- Born: January 31, 1973 (age 53); Lynwood, California, U.S.
- Listed height: 5 ft 11 in (1.80 m)
- Listed weight: 183 lb (83 kg)

Career information
- High school: Carson (Carson, California)
- College: El Camino (1991–1992); Fresno State (1993–1994)

Career history
- Amsterdam Admirals (1997); San Diego Chargers (1997–1998); Los Angeles Xtreme (2001); Calgary Stampeders (2003)

Awards and highlights
- XFL champion (2001)

Career NFL statistics
- Punt return yards: 387
- Kick return yards: 528
- Stats at Pro Football Reference

Latario Rachal (born January 31, 1973) is an American former professional football player in the National Football League. He played two years for the San Diego Chargers, primarily as a special teams punt returner and a wide receiver. In 1998, he finished 2nd in the AFC, with 387 yards on 32 returns. He did not return after 1998 to the Chargers.

He previously coached football and track at Chadwick School in Palos Verdes, California and is a wide receivers coach at his brother's 'Pride N Skills Academy' in Palos Verdes, California.

He is currently the wide receivers coach at Servite High School. Rachal also trains several collegiate and high school athletes in Carson, California.
