= Matt Keneley =

American football player (born 1973)

No. 75
- Position: Defensive tackle

Personal information
- Born: December 1, 1973 (age 52); Santa Ana, California, U.S.
- Listed height: 6 ft 5 in (1.96 m)
- Listed weight: 295 lb (134 kg)

Career information
- High school: Mission Viejo (Mission Viejo, California)
- College: USC
- NFL draft: 1997: 7th round, 208th overall pick

Career history
- New York Giant (1997)*; New York Jets (1998)*; San Jose SaberCats (1998); Detroit Lions (1998)*; San Francisco 49ers (1999); Green Bay Packers (2000)*; Seattle Seahawks (2000)*; San Francisco 49ers (2000)*; Los Angeles Xtreme (2001); San Jose SaberCats (2001); Green Bay Packers (2001)*; San Jose SaberCats (2002); Detroit Fury (2003)
- * Offseason or practice squad member only

Awards and highlights
- XFL champion (2001); ArenaBowl champion (2002)

Career NFL statistics
- Games played: 7
- Tackles: 3
- Stats at Pro Football Reference

Matthew Edward Keneley (born December 1, 1973) is an American former professional football player who was a defensive tackle in the National Football League (NFL). He was selected in the seventh round of the 1997 NFL draft with the 208th overall pick. He played in the NFL for the San Francisco 49ers in 1999 and for the Los Angeles Xtreme of the XFL in 2001.
