= Tinker Keck =

American football player (born 1976)

Tinker "Ty" Keck (born August 10, 1976, in Colby, Kansas) is a Hollywood fitness trainer, former NFL defensive back for the New York Giants and XFL's Los Angeles Xtreme and former actor.

== Early life ==
Keck attended Colby High School in Colby Kansas his Freshman year, and Goodland High School in Goodland, Kansas his Sophomore, Junior and Senior years and was a student and a letterman in football, basketball, and track & field. In football, as a senior, he led his team to a Conference Title and was an All-League selection. In track & field, he was a two-time State Champion in the triple jump, State Champion in the 4x100 M relay and placed at the State Finals on the long jump as a sophomore and as a senior.

== College and pro football career ==
He played defensive back for the university of Cincinnati Bearcats, where he was known as a prolific kick returner. He made All-Conference and All-American and was team captain for the Bearcats. He tied the NCAA record for most punt returns for touchdowns (four) and (two) in one game.

He played in the XFL for the XFL Champions Los Angeles Xtreme where he recorded 2 interceptions. He signed as a free agent in the National Football League with the New York Giants in April 2000. The Giants played in Super Bowl XXXV that year.

== The Moment of Truth ==
He appeared as the first contestant on Fox's reality/game show The Moment of Truth on January 23, 2008. According to the show, he is married to a woman named Catia.

== Ab Rocket ==
He appears as a celebrity endorser for the Ab Rocket exercise device. According to the infomercial for this product, he is a celebrity fitness trainer in Los Angeles. It also credits him with playing for the New York Giants.
