= Darnell McDonald (gridiron football) =

American gridiron football player (born 1976)

No. 80, 84
- Position: Wide receiver

Personal information
- Born: May 26, 1976 (age 50); Fairfax, Virginia, U.S.
- Listed height: 6 ft 3 in (1.91 m)
- Listed weight: 190 lb (86 kg)

Career information
- High school: Hayfield (Alexandria, Virginia)
- College: Garden City (1995–1996); Kansas State (1997–1998)
- NFL draft: 1999: 7th round, 240th overall pick

Career history
- Tampa Bay Buccaneers (1999); Los Angeles Xtreme (2001); British Columbia Lions (2001); Miami Dolphins (2002)*; Calgary Stampeders (2003); Montreal Alouettes (2004)*; Winnipeg Blue Bombers (2005); New Orleans VooDoo (2007)
- * Offseason or practice squad member only

Awards and highlights
- XFL champion (2001); First-team All-Big 12 (1998)

Career NFL statistics
- Receptions: 9
- Receiving yards: 96
- Receiving touchdowns: 1
- Stats at Pro Football Reference

Darnell Ali McDonald (born May 26, 1976) is a former wide receiver for the Los Angeles Xtreme of the XFL. McDonald played one season for the Tampa Bay Buccaneers in the NFL in 1999. He was drafted in the seventh round of the 1999 NFL Draft. He also played for the BC Lions, Calgary Stampeders and Winnipeg Blue Bombers of the Canadian Football League. McDonald played for the New Orleans VooDoo of the Arena Football League in 2007. He holds the record for most receiving yards at the Fiesta Bowl with 206 yards in 1998 and tying Rhett Dawson for most touchdown receptions with 3. He was credited with being a key to success in the win by Kansas State against Syracuse.

== College career ==
McDonald played two seasons at Garden City. In 1996, McDonald recorded 73 catches for 1,165 yards and 10 touchdowns for the Broncbusters. After two seasons of play, McDonald transferred to Kansas State. In the 1997 Fiesta Bowl, McDonald set a record with 206 receiving yards and three touchdowns.

=== Statistics ===
Season	Team	Games		Receiving			
Season	Team	GP	GS	Rec	Yds	Avg	TD
1997	Kansas State	11	6	21	441	21.0	6
1998	Kansas State	12	11	75	1,092	14.6	9
Regular season		23	17	96	1,533	16.0	15
Bowl games		2	2	12	330	27.5	5

Bowl games only began counting toward single-season and career statistics in 2002.

- 1997 Fiesta Bowl – Played and started. 7 receptions, 206 yards, 3 TD
- 1998 Alamo Bowl – Played and started. 5 receptions, 124 yards, 2 TD

== Professional career ==
=== Tampa Bay Buccaneers ===
McDonald was drafted by the Tampa Bay Buccaneers in the seventh round of the 1999 NFL draft with the 240th overall pick. In week 9, he recorded his first NFL touchdown on a 10-yard reception from quarterback Trent Dilfer against the New Orleans Saints. On the season, he appeared in eight games and recorded nine receptions for 96 yards and a touchdown. He was released on July 30, 2000.

=== Los Angeles Xtreme ===
On October 30, 2000, McDonald was selected 305th overall in the 2001 XFL draft by the Los Angeles Xtreme. On the season he had 34 receptions for 456 yards. He also led the league with eight touchdown catches. In the championship game against San Francisco, McDonald had seven receptions for 82 yards in the victory.

=== British Columbia Lions ===
On August 1, 2001, McDonald signed with the British Columbia Lions of the Canadian Football League (CFL). On the season he had 34 receptions for 456 yards and two touchdowns. On February 27, 2002, McDonald signed with the Miami Dolphins. He was released on June 13, 2002. He then returned to British Columbia where he was released on September 24, 2002.

=== Calgary Stampeders (first stint) ===
On August 17, 2003, McDonald signed with the Calgary Stampeders of the Canadian Football League (CFL). In his first season with Calgary, he appeared in 14 games and led the team with 67 receptions for 1,0002 yards and four touchdowns. He was named CFL West All-star. He re-signed with the Stampeders on December 18, 2003, and was released in May 2004.

=== Montreal Alouettes ===
In 2004, McDonald signed with the Montreal Alouettes of the Canadian Football League (CFL). He did not play due to injury.

=== Winnipeg Blue Bombers ===
On August 4, 2005, McDonald signed with the Winnipeg Blue Bombers of the Canadian Football League (CFL). In five games he recorded 17 receptions for 232 yards and one touchdown.

=== Calgary Stampeders (second stint) ===
On January 31, 2006, with the Calgary Stampeders of the Canadian Football League (CFL). He was released before appearing in a game.

=== New Orleans VooDoo ===
McDonald signed with the New Orleans VooDoo of the Arena Football League (AFL). He appeared in three games and recorded 29 receptions for 302 yards and three touchdowns.

== Professional career statistics ==
NFL

Year	Team	Games		Receiving				
Year	Team	GP	GS	Rec	Yds	Avg	Lng	TD
1999	TB	8	0	9	96	10.7	23	1
Career		8	0	9	96	10.7	23	1

XFL

Regular season
Year	Team	Games		Receiving				
Year	Team	GP	GS	Rec	Yds	Avg	Lng	TD
2001	LA	8	8	34	456	13.4	39	8
Career		8	8	34	356	13.4	39	8

Postseason
Year	Team	Games		Receiving				
Year	Team	GP	GS	Rec	Yds	Avg	Lng	TD
2001	LA	2	2	9	118	13.1	23	0

CFL

Year	Team	Games		Receiving				
Year	Team	GP	GS	Rec	Yds	Avg	Lng	TD
2001	BC	10	?	31	558	18.0	65	2
2003	CGY	14	?	67	1,002	15.0	47	4
2004	MTL	Did Not Play (injury—knee)						
2005	WPG	5	3	17	232	13.6	23	3
Career		29	?	115	1,792	15.6	65	7

AFL

Year	Team	Games		Receiving				
Year	Team	GP	GS	Rec	Yds	Avg	Lng	TD
2007	NO	3	?	29	302	10.4	25	3
Career		3	?	29	302	10.4	25	3
