= Scott Milanovich =

American gridiron football player and coach (born 1973)

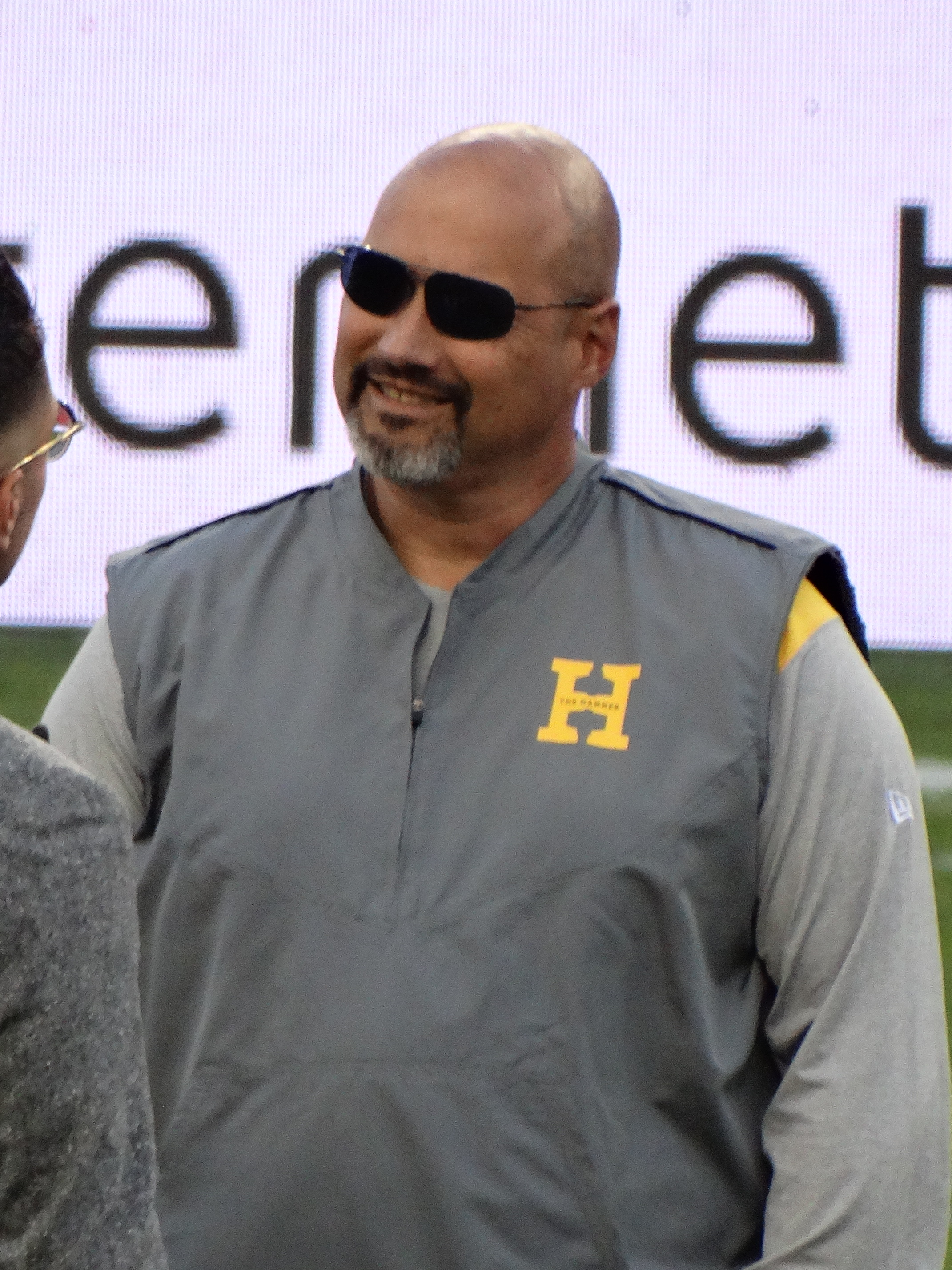
- Milanovich with the Hamilton Tiger-Cats in 2024

Hamilton Tiger-Cats
- Title: Head coach

Personal information
- Born: January 25, 1973 (age 53); Butler, Pennsylvania, U.S.
- Listed height: 6 ft 3 in (1.91 m)
- Listed weight: 220 lb (100 kg)

Career information
- Position: Quarterback (No. 13, 16)
- High school: Butler Senior
- College: Maryland
- NFL draft: 1996: undrafted
- Expansion draft: 1999: 1st round, 29th overall pick

Career history

Playing
- Tampa Bay Buccaneers (1996–1998); Cleveland Browns (1999)*; Tampa Bay Buccaneers (1999–2000); → Berlin Thunder (2000); Los Angeles Xtreme (2001); Tampa Bay Storm (2002); Calgary Stampeders (2003)
- * Offseason or practice squad member only

Coaching
- Rhein Fire (2003) Quarterbacks coach; Calgary Stampeders (2003) Quarterbacks coach; Rhein Fire (2004) Quarterbacks coach; Rhein Fire (2005) Offensive coordinator & quarterbacks coach; Cologne Centurions (2006) Offensive coordinator & quarterbacks coach; Montreal Alouettes (2007) Quarterbacks coach; Montreal Alouettes (2008) Offensive coordinator & quarterbacks coach; Montreal Alouettes (2009–2011) Assistant head coach, offensive coordinator & quarterbacks coach; Toronto Argonauts (2012–2016) Head coach; Jacksonville Jaguars (2017–2019) Quarterbacks coach; Edmonton Football Team (2020) Head coach; Indianapolis Colts (2021–2022) Quarterbacks coach; Hamilton Tiger-Cats (2023) Senior assistant coach; Hamilton Tiger-Cats (2024–present) Head coach

Awards and highlights
- 3× Grey Cup champion (2009, 2010, 2012); XFL champion (2001); First-team All-ACC (1993); Second-team All-ACC (1994); 2012 CFL Coach of the Year

Career NFL statistics
- Comp. / Att.: 2 / 3
- Passing yards: 9
- Passer rating: 70.1
- Stats at Pro Football Reference

Career AFL statistics
- Comp. / Att.: 101 / 181
- Passing yards: 1,223
- TD–INT: 22–4
- Passer rating: 97.92
- Stats at ArenaFan.com

Head coaching record
- Regular season: CFL: 43–47 (.478)
- Postseason: CFL: 3–2 (.600)
- Career: CFL: 46–49 (.484)

Scott Stewart Milanovich (born January 25, 1973) is an American professional football coach and former player who is the head coach for the Hamilton Tiger-Cats of the Canadian Football League (CFL). He was also the head coach of the Toronto Argonauts and Edmonton Football Team of the CFL. Milanovich has also held positional coaching roles in the NFL Europe and the National Football League (NFL).

Milanovich's playing career lasted from 1996 to 2003 as a quarterback in the NFL for the Tampa Bay Buccaneers and Cleveland Browns, in NFL Europe for the Berlin Thunder, in the XFL for the Los Angeles Xtreme, in the Arena Football League for the Tampa Bay Storm, and in the CFL for the Calgary Stampeders. Milanovich played college football for the Maryland Terrapins.

== Early life ==
Milanovich played high school football at Butler Senior High School in Butler, Pennsylvania.

== College career ==
Milanovich attended the University of Maryland, where he played college football as a quarterback and punter. Milanovich played as a true freshman, backing up John Kaleo and recording 1 touchdown and 1 interception across 11 games. Milanovich started to begin his sophomore year, where he recorded 26 touchdowns and 18 interceptions, in addition to three rushing touchdowns. He also led the ACC that season in passing attempts, completions, yards, and interceptions. As a junior, Milanovich recorded 20 touchdowns to 9 interceptions, leading the NCAA that season in completion percentage (68.8), leading the ACC again in completions and for the first time in touchdowns. Prior to the 1995 season, Milanovich and four other Maryland players received suspensions for betting on college football and basketball games. Milanovich received an eight-game suspension (later reduced to four) during his senior year for having bet between $25 and $50 on a total of six games. The bets had no impact on the outcome of the games. Milanovich struggled upon his return, throwing for two touchdowns and seven interceptions, though his senior season was the only one in which Maryland had a winning record. Despite his senior struggles, Milanovich held several career passing records for Maryland, including attempts, completions, yards, completion percentage, and touchdowns.

Milanovich was named the MVP for the Blue squad in the Blue-Gray Classic, and completed 9 of 20 pass attempts for 175 yards and two touchdowns.

== Professional career ==
Pre-draft measurables
Height	Weight	Arm length	Hand span
6 ft 2 1/2 in (1.89 m)	218 lb (99 kg)	30 1/4 in (0.77 m)	9 1/4 in (0.23 m)
All values from NFL Combine

=== Tampa Bay Buccaneers ===
After going undrafted in the 1996 NFL draft, Milanovich signed as a free agent with the Tampa Bay Buccaneers. During his rookie campaign, he was designated as the team's third quarterback for 15 games, seeing action in one contest. In that game he completed two of three passes for nine yards. In 1997, he was declared inactive before all 16 regular season games and both playoff contests.

=== Cleveland Browns ===
After being left unprotected by the Buccaneers in the 1999 NFL expansion draft, Milanovich was the only quarterback selected by the Cleveland Browns, but he never played for the team. He was released by the Browns on June 3, 1999.

=== Tampa Bay Buccaneers (second stint) / Berlin Thunder ===
On November 30, 1999, after injuries to quarterbacks Eric Zeier and Trent Dilfer, the Tampa Bay Buccaneers signed Milanovich to serve as the backup quarterback to Shaun King. In the spring of 2000, Milanovich was allocated to the Berlin Thunder of the NFL Europe. In Berlin, he shared quarterback duties with Eric Kresser. On the season, he completed 148 of 265 passes for 1,651 yards with 12 touchdowns and seven interceptions, while also rushing for 36 yards and one touchdown. After returning from NFL Europe, Milanovich re-signed with the Tampa Bay Buccaneers on May 8, 2000. He was later released following the third preseason game on August 22, 2000.

=== Los Angeles Xtreme ===
On October 28, 2000, Milanovich was selected by the Los Angeles Xtreme in the first round (first overall) of the 2001 XFL draft. He competed for the starting quarterback role but ultimately lost the job to Tommy Maddox, who went on to be named the league’s MVP. Milanovich served as the Xtreme’s backup quarterback during the league’s only season in 2001. He appeared in four regular season games, completing 2 of 9 passes for 45 yards with one interception. In the championship game, the Million Dollar Game, Milanovich saw limited action and helped lead a touchdown drive in the second half, completing 1 of 4 passes for 23 yards, as the Xtreme defeated the San Francisco Demons 38–6 to win the XFL title.

=== Tampa Bay Storm ===
On March 13, 2002, Milanovich signed with the Tampa Bay Storm of the Arena Football League. He made his Storm debut in the season opener against the Toronto Phantoms but did not record any statistics. His first statistics came in Week 3 against the Carolina Cobras, replacing starter Shane Stafford, and he completed 5 of 13 passes for 90 yards with three touchdowns and one interception. Following a 1–5 start to the season, he made his first start in Week 7 against the Indiana Firebirds, completing a franchise-record 31 of 47 passes for a season-high 321 yards and five touchdowns with one interception in a 53–52 victory. Another strong performance came in his final start against the Dallas Desperados, where he threw for 316 yards and five touchdowns. He was injured during that game, and Stafford returned as the starter the following week. As a starter, Milanovich led the Storm to a 2–2 record. In Week 14 against the Georgia Force, kicker Matt Huerkamp was injured during the game, and Milanovich took over kicking duties, making one of three extra point attempts. During the season, he appeared in eight games, making four starts, and completed 101 of 181 passes for 1,223 yards with 22 touchdowns and four interceptions.

=== Calgary Stampeders ===
On July 3, 2003, Milanovich signed with the Calgary Stampeders of the Canadian Football League. With the Stampeders, he dressed for 10 games and made two starts. He completed 49 of 72 passes for 521 yards with one touchdown and seven interceptions, and the team lost both of his starts. He was released on September 24 and later transitioned into a quarterback coach.

== Career statistics ==
=== Professional ===
==== NFL ====
Year	Team	Games			Passing								Rushing			
Year	Team	GP	GS	Record	Cmp	Att	Pct	Yds	Y/A	TD	Int	Rtg	Att	Yds	Avg	TD
1996	TB	1	0	—	2	3	66.7	9	3.0	0	0	70.1	0	0	0.0	0
1997	TB	0	0	—	DNP											
1998	TB	0	0	—	DNP											
1999	TB	0	0	—	DNP											
Career		1	0	0–0	2	3	66.7	9	3.0	0	0	70.1	0	0	0.0	0

==== XFL ====
Year	Team	Games			Passing								Rushing			
Year	Team	GP	GS	Record	Cmp	Att	Pct	Yds	Y/A	TD	Int	Rtg	Att	Yds	Avg	TD
2001	LA	4	0	—	2	9	22.2	45	5.0	0	1	8.3	5	–15	–3.0	0
Career		4	0	0–0	2	9	22.2	45	5.0	0	1	8.3	5	–15	–3.0	0

==== AFL ====
Year	Team	Games			Passing								Rushing			
Year	Team	GP	GS	Record	Cmp	Att	Pct	Yds	Y/A	TD	Int	Rtg	Att	Yds	Avg	TD
2002	TB	8	4	2–2	101	181	55.8	1,223	6.8	22	4	97.9	3	–2	–0.7	0
Career		8	4	2–2	101	181	55.8	1,223	6.8	22	4	97.9	3	–2	–0.7	0

==== CFL ====
Year	Team	Games			Passing								Rushing			
Year	Team	GD	GS	Record	Cmp	Att	Pct	Yds	Y/A	TD	Int	Rtg	Att	Yds	Avg	TD
2003	CGY	10	2	0–2	40	72	55.6	521	7.2	1	7	43.6	3	6	2.0	0
Career		10	2	0–2	40	72	55.6	521	7.2	1	7	43.6	3	6	2.0	0

=== College ===
Season	Team	Games			Passing								Rushing			
Season	Team	GP	GS	Record	Cmp	Att	Pct	Yds	Y/A	TD	Int	Rtg	Att	Yds	Avg	TD
1991	Maryland	0	0	—	Redshirted (redshirt)											
1992	Maryland	4	0	—	17	30	56.7	232	7.7	1	1	126.0	7	25	3.6	0
1993	Maryland	11	11	2–9	279	431	64.7	3,499	8.1	26	18	144.5	91	–62	–0.7	3
1994	Maryland	11	9	3–6	229	333	68.8	2,394	7.2	20	9	143.6	50	–62	–1.2	0
1995	Maryland	7	5	2–3	125	188	66.5	1,176	6.3	2	7	115.1	20	–91	–4.6	1
Career		33	25	7–18	650	982	66.2	7,301	7.4	49	35	138.0	168	–190	–1.1	4

== Coaching career ==
=== Rhein Fire ===
Milanovich began his coaching career as the quarterbacks coach for the Rhein Fire of NFL Europe in the spring of 2003.

=== Calgary Stampeders ===
In 2003, Milanovich joined the Calgary Stampeders of the Canadian Football League where he was their quarterbacks coach.

=== Mansfield University ===
Between the 2004 and 2005 seasons, Milanovich was the quarterbacks coach and offensive coordinator for the now defunct Mansfield University Mountaineers football team.

=== Rhein Fire (second stint) ===
In 2004, he returned to the Rhein Fire where he served another season as quarterbacks coach. He was elevated to the position of offensive coordinator in 2005.

=== Cologne Centurions ===
In 2006, Milanovich was the offensive coordinator for the Cologne Centurions.

=== Montreal Alouettes ===
Milanovich returned to the CFL in February 2007 when he was named quarterbacks coach of the Montreal Alouettes. A year later he was promoted to offensive coordinator. In 2009, he added the title of assistant head coach.

=== Toronto Argonauts ===
On December 1, 2011, Milanovich was named the 42nd head coach of the Toronto Argonauts. His Argonauts won the Grey Cup in his first season at the helm. Following a 9–9 regular season in 2012, Milanovich led the Toronto Argonauts to a 35–22 Grey Cup victory over the Calgary Stampeders in his debut season as a head coach, and was named the 2012 CFL Coach of the Year.

Milanovich's second season as Argonauts head coach was a successful one. The team battled plenty of injuries yet still managed to finish first place in the Eastern Division with an 11–7 record, the Argonauts' first division championship since the 2007 season. The Argonauts would eventually lose 36-24 in the Eastern Final playoff game to Hamilton.

Due to uncertainty over his future with the Argonauts, Milanovich resigned as the team's head coach.

=== Jacksonville Jaguars ===
On January 26, 2017, Milanovich was hired by the Jacksonville Jaguars as their quarterbacks coach under head coach Doug Marrone. In November 2018, with the Jaguars offense struggling, offensive coordinator Nathaniel Hackett was fired and Milanovich assumed play-calling duties. Following the 2018 season, Milanovich then relinquished offensive coordinator duties to the recently hired John DeFilippo.

=== 2019–2021 ===
On December 12, 2019, Milanovich was named the 22nd head coach of the Edmonton Eskimos. He remained the Jaguars' quarterbacks coach until the end of the 2019 season. He named his coaching staff on January 21, 2020, but the 2020 CFL season was eventually cancelled due to the COVID-19 pandemic. On January 25, 2021, Milanovich resigned as head coach in order to pursue NFL opportunities.

=== Indianapolis Colts ===
On January 27, 2021, Milanovich was hired by the Indianapolis Colts as their quarterbacks coach under head coach Frank Reich, replacing Marcus Brady, who was promoted to offensive coordinator.

=== Hamilton Tiger-Cats ===
Milanovich in 2025

On May 11, 2023, the Hamilton Tiger-Cats announced that Milanovich had joined the organization as a senior assistant coach. After the team's offensive coordinator, Tommy Condell, was fired, Milanovich assumed play calling duties on August 7, 2023.

On December 6, 2023, the Hamilton Tiger-Cats announced that Milanovich was promoted to the role of head coach, becoming the 27th head coach in team history.

== Head coaching record ==
=== CFL ===
Team	Year	Regular season					Postseason		
Team	Year	Won	Lost	Ties	Win %	Finish	Won	Lost	Result
TOR	2012	9	9	0	.500	2nd in East Division	3	0	Won 100th Grey Cup
TOR	2013	11	7	0	.611	1st in East Division	0	1	Lost in East Final
TOR	2014	8	10	0	.444	4th in East Division	–	–	Failed to Qualify
TOR	2015	10	8	0	.556	3rd in East Division	0	1	Lost in East Semi-Final
TOR	2016	5	13	0	.278	4th in East Division	–	–	Failed to Qualify
HAM	2024	7	11	0	.389	4th in East Division	–	–	Failed to Qualify
HAM	2025	11	7	0	.556	1st in East Division	0	1	Lost in East Final
HAM	2026	6	12	0	.333	3rd in East Division	–	–	Failed to Qualify
Total		67	77	0	.465	2 Division Championships	3	3	1 Grey Cup

== Legal troubles ==
Following his time in Tampa Bay he was charged with driving under the influence for an incident on April 11, 1998. He was pulled over by police in Pinellas Park, Florida, and found to have a blood alcohol content of 0.135. He pleaded no contest and received a $550 fine, probation, 50 hours of community service and six-month driver's license suspension. He was able to pay the Salvation Army in order to avoid the community service requirement.
