= Terry Billups =

American gridiron football player (born 1975)

No. 29, 27, 25
- Position: Defensive back

Personal information
- Born: February 9, 1975 (age 51); Wiesbaden, Germany
- Listed height: 5 ft 9 in (1.75 m)
- Listed weight: 180 lb (82 kg)

Career information
- High school: Oak Ridge (Orlando, Florida, U.S.)
- College: North Carolina
- NFL draft: 1998: undrafted

Career history
- New England Patriots (1998)*; Miami Dolphins (1998)*; Dallas Cowboys (1998); → Scottish Claymores (1999)*; → Rhein Fire (1999); New England Patriots (1999); Los Angeles Xtreme (2001); Hamilton Tiger-Cats (2001)
- * Offseason or practice squad member only
- Stats at Pro Football Reference

Terry Michael Billups (born February 9, 1975) is an American former professional football defensive back in the National Football League (NFL) for the New England Patriots and Dallas Cowboys. He also was a member of the Rhein Fire, Los Angeles Xtreme and Hamilton Tiger-Cats. He played college football at the University of North Carolina.

== Early life ==
Billups attended Oak Ridge High School. As a senior, he was a two-way player, collecting 88 tackles, 4 interceptions, 32 carries for 325 yards, 5 receptions of 140 yards and 4 touchdowns. He received All-Central Florida honors and was a two-time All-conference and All-county selection.

He also lettered in track. As a senior, he won the state title in the 110 metres hurdles and was named the Orlando Downtown Athletic Club's Scholar-Athlete.

== College career ==
Billups accepted a football scholarship from the University of North Carolina. As a redshirt freshman, he appeared in 12 games with 4 starts.

As a sophomore, he missed spring practice while recovering from shoulder surgery. He started 10 games at cornerback.

As a junior, he had a second offseason shoulder surgery. He was a backup at cornerback, registering 7 tackles, 4 passes defensed and one interception.

As a senior, he was a backup cornerback on a defense that was ranked second in the nation, that included future NFL players like Greg Ellis, Brian Simmons, Dré Bly, Vonnie Holliday, Omar Brown, Kivuusama Mays, Russell Davis, Robert Williams, Ebenezer Ekuban, Keith Newman and Nate Hobgood-Chittick. He posted 10 tackles and one forced fumble. He had 5 tackles and one forced fumble against Florida State University.

== Professional career ==
In 1998, he was signed as an undrafted free agent by the New England Patriots. He was waived before the start of the season on August 25 and later signed to the practice squad. He was released on September 10.

On September 15, 1998, he was signed to the Miami Dolphins' practice squad. He was released on September 30.

On September 30, 1998, he was signed to the Dallas Cowboys' practice squad. He was promoted to the active roster on November 24. He appeared in one game and had one pass defensed against the Minnesota Vikings. He did not play against the New Orleans Saints. He was released on December 7. He was re-signed to the practice squad on December 9.

On February 18, 1999, he was allocated to the Scottish Claymores of NFL Europe. He suffered a back injury during training camp and was placed on the injured reserve on April 16, before being released. On May 4, he was signed by the Rhein Fire of NFL Europe, where he collected 4 tackles, one pass defensed, and one special teams tackle. He was released by the Cowboys before the start of the season on September 1.

On December 15, 1999, he signed as a free agent with the New England Patriots. He appeared in 2 games with one start. On March 13, 2000, the team rescinded his tender offer, making him a free agent.

In 2001, he signed with the Los Angeles Xtreme of the XFL. He appeared in 10 games as a backup cornerback, making 18 tackles and 3 interceptions.

On May 10, 2001, he signed with the Hamilton Tiger-Cats of the Canadian Football League. He appeared in 10 games with 7 starts, posting 13 tackles and one interception.

== Personal life ==
His brother Lewis Billups played defensive back in the NFL. Billups opened his own law firm in 2019.
