= Rashaan Shehee =

American football player (born 1975)

No. 22
- Position: Running back

Personal information
- Born: June 20, 1975 (age 51); Los Angeles, California, U.S.
- Listed height: 5 ft 10 in (1.78 m)
- Listed weight: 205 lb (93 kg)

Career information
- High school: Bakersfield (CA) Foothill
- College: Washington
- NFL draft: 1998: 3rd round, 88th overall pick

Career history
- Kansas City Chiefs (1998–1999); Los Angeles Xtreme (2001)

Awards and highlights
- First-team All-Pac-10 (1997); Second-team All-Pac-10 (1995)

Career NFL statistics
- Rushing yards: 295
- Average: 3.4
- Touchdowns: 1
- Stats at Pro Football Reference

Rashaan Shehee (born June 20, 1975) is an American former professional football player who was a running back for the Kansas City Chiefs of the National Football League (NFL).

Shehee attended Foothill High School in Bakersfield, California. He then played college football for the Washington Huskies.

Shehee was selected in the third round of the 1998 NFL Draft with the 88th overall pick. He played two seasons in the NFL, both for the Chiefs. He started five games in 1999. He continued his professional career in the short-lived XFL, playing for the Los Angeles Xtreme with "The Truth" as his nickname.

Shehee was inducted into the Foothill High School Hall of Fame in 2014, and the Bob Elias Kern County Sports Hall of Fame in 2016. As of 2016, Shehee is a teacher at Bakersfield High School.
