= Reggie Durden =

American gridiron football player (born 1976)

No. 21
- Position: Cornerback

Personal information
- Born: November 22, 1976 (age 49); Houston, Texas, U.S.
- Listed height: 5 ft 8 in (1.73 m)
- Listed weight: 170 lb (77 kg)

Career information
- High school: Sam Houston
- College: Florida State
- NFL draft: 2000: undrafted

Career history
- Los Angeles Xtreme (2001); Montreal Alouettes (2001–2005); Edmonton Eskimos (2006)

Awards and highlights
- Grey Cup champion (2002); BCS national champion (1999)
- Stats at CFL.ca (archive)

Reggie Durden (born November 22, 1976) is an American former professional football defensive back.

== College career ==
Reggie Durden played two seasons at Florida State University. In 1999, he shared the Most Improved Player honors at cornerback. He also returned punts and kickoffs for the seminoles, and had 2 interceptions and 13 tackles in 1998.

== Professional career ==
Durden joined the Montreal Alouettes in 2001 as a punt returner after a season with the Los Angeles Xtreme of the XFL. Before the 2006 CFL season, Durden was traded from the Montreal Alouettes to the Edmonton Eskimos. He played one season with the Eskimos before being released.

== Personal life ==
Currently Durden is a football coach at Eisenhower High School
