= Oteman Sampson =

American gridiron football player (born 1975)

No. 2, 18, 3, 16
- Position: Quarterback

Personal information
- Born: April 25, 1975 (age 51); Miami, Florida, U.S.
- Listed height: 6 ft 0 in (1.83 m)
- Listed weight: 195 lb (88 kg)

Career information
- High school: Edison (Miami)
- College: Florida A&M
- NFL draft: 1998: undrafted

Career history
- Calgary Stampeders (1999–2000); Toronto Argonauts (2000); San Francisco Demons (2001); Ottawa Renegades (2002)

Awards and highlights
- First-team Div. I-AA All-American (1997); MEAC Offensive Player of the Year (1997); First-team All-MEAC (1997)

Oteman C. Sampson Delancy Sr. (born April 25, 1975) is an American former professional football quarterback who played three seasons in the Canadian Football League (CFL) with the Calgary Stampeders, Toronto Argonauts and Ottawa Renegades. He played college football at Albany State University and Florida A&M University. He was also a member of the San Francisco Demons of the XFL.

== Early life ==
Sampson was born on April 25, 1975, in Miami, Florida. He attended Miami Edison High School in Little Haiti, Miami, Florida.

== College career ==
Sampson first played college football for the Albany State Golden Rams of Albany State University. He later transferred to play for the Florida A&M Rattlers of Florida A&M University from 1996 to 1997. As a junior in 1996, he set school records in completions with 172, passing attempts with 307, passing yards with 2,814, and passing touchdowns with 21. Sampson broke his own records the next year by completing 215 of 379 passes for 3,292 yards and 25 touchdowns, earning Division I-AA first-team All-American, Mid-Eastern Athletic Conference (MEAC) Offensive Player of the Year, and first-team All-MEAC honors. Sampson threw for 469 yards and four touchdowns in the 52–37 loss to Georgia Southern in the first round of the 1997 Division I-AA playoffs. He was inducted into Florida A&M's athletics hall of fame in 2006.

== Professional career ==
Sampson went undrafted in the 1998 NFL draft. He signed with the Calgary Stampeders of the Canadian Football League (CFL) on January 22, 1999. He dressed in all 18 games for the Stampeders during the 1999 season but only attempted two passes. He dressed in the first game of the 2000 season before being released on July 13, 2000.

Sampson was signed by the Toronto Argonauts of the CFL on July 27, 2000. He dressed in eight games, starting one, for the Argonauts in 2000, completing 19 of 35 passes (54.3%) for 157 yards and two interceptions while also rushing seven times for 43 yards. Sampson then played in eight games for the San Francisco Demons of the XFL in 2001, recording one rushing attempt for five yards. He returned to the Argonauts after the XFL season, and was released on June 30, 2001.

Sampson signed with the CFL's Ottawa Renegades on April 8, 2002. He dressed in all 18 games, starting one, for the Renegades in 2002, recording 43 completions on 72 passing attempts (59.7%) for 426 yards, one touchdown, and one interception. He was released on February 20, 2003.

== Personal life ==
Sampson graduated from Florida A&M in 1999 with a Bachelor of Science in construction engineering. He later graduated from the Florida A&M University College of Law with a Juris Doctor in 2011.
