= Damon Gibson =

American football player (born 1975)

No. 84, 81, 85, 87
- Positions: Wide receiver, return specialist

Personal information
- Born: February 25, 1975 (age 51); Houston, Texas, U.S.
- Listed height: 5 ft 9 in (1.75 m)
- Listed weight: 180 lb (82 kg)

Career information
- High school: Forest Brook (Houston)
- College: Iowa (1994–1997)
- NFL draft: 1998: undrafted
- Expansion draft: 1999: 1st round, 4th overall pick

Career history
- Cincinnati Bengals (1998); Cleveland Browns (1999); Scottish Claymores (2000); Los Angeles Xtreme (2001); Jacksonville Jaguars (2001–2002); Atlanta Falcons (2002)

Career NFL statistics
- Receptions: 21
- Receiving yards: 271
- Receiving touchdowns: 3
- Return yards: 1,468
- Return touchdowns: 1
- Stats at Pro Football Reference

Damon O'Keith Gibson (born February 25, 1975) is an American former professional football player who was a wide receiver and return specialist in the National Football League (NFL). He played college football for the Iowa Hawkeyes. He played four seasons in the NFL, 1998 with the Cincinnati Bengals 1999 with the Cleveland Browns, 2001 with the Jacksonville Jaguars, and 2002 with both Jaguars and the Atlanta Falcons. He was released by the Jaguars two days after he fumbled a punt return that led to the Indianapolis Colts winning by 3 points. He also played for the Los Angeles Xtreme of the XFL in 2001.

He was used primarily on special teams, as he had a 65-yard touchdown return in his first game for the Bengals. He had 218 punt return yards on 27 returns in his rookie year.
