= Leonta Rheams =

American football player (born 1976)

No. 75, 92
- Position: Defensive tackle

Personal information
- Born: August 1, 1976 (age 50); Tyler, Texas, U.S.
- Listed height: 6 ft 2 in (1.88 m)
- Listed weight: 303 lb (137 kg)

Career information
- High school: Robert E. Lee (Tyler)
- College: Houston
- NFL draft: 1998: 4th round, 115th overall pick

Career history
- New England Patriots (1998); Memphis Maniax (2001)

Career NFL statistics
- Tackles: 3
- Stats at Pro Football Reference

Leonta Rheams (born August 1, 1976) is an American former professional football player who was a defensive tackle for the New England Patriots of the National Football League (NFL). He was selected in the fourth round of the 1998 NFL draft. He also played professionally with the Memphis Maniax of the XFL. Rheams played college football for the Houston Cougars. In the NFL, he appeared in six games during his only season in the league and made two tackles, one unassisted. In the XFL, he finished sixth on the Maniax with 21 tackles (7 unassisted) with one sack.
