= Tommy Maddox =

American football player (born 1971)

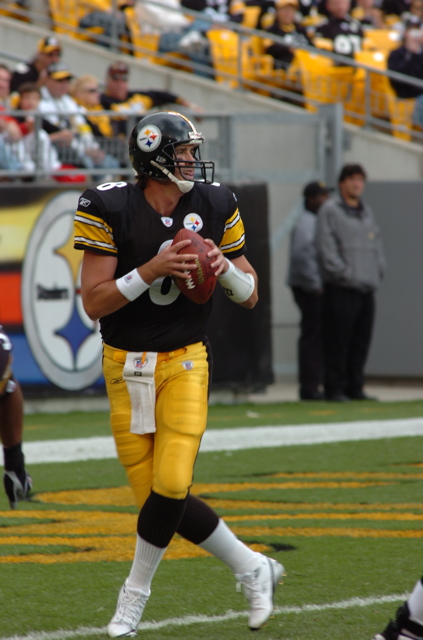
- Maddox with the Pittsburgh Steelers in 2005

No. 8, 12
- Position: Quarterback

Personal information
- Born: September 2, 1971 (age 55); Shreveport, Louisiana, U.S.
- Listed height: 6 ft 4 in (1.93 m)
- Listed weight: 219 lb (99 kg)

Career information
- High school: L. D. Bell (Hurst, Texas)
- College: UCLA (1990–1991)
- NFL draft: 1992: 1st round, 25th overall pick

Career history
- Denver Broncos (1992–1993); Los Angeles Rams (1994); New York Giants (1995); Atlanta Falcons (1997)*; New Jersey Red Dogs (2000); Los Angeles Xtreme (2001); Pittsburgh Steelers (2001–2005); Philadelphia Soul (2006)*
- * Offseason or practice squad member only

Awards and highlights
- Super Bowl champion (XL); NFL Comeback Player of the Year (2002); XFL champion (2001); XFL Most Valuable Player (2001)

Career NFL statistics
- Passing attempts: 1,200
- Passing completions: 683
- Completion percentage: 57.2%
- TD–INT: 48–54
- Passing yards: 8,087
- Passer rating: 72.4
- Stats at Pro Football Reference

Career AFL statistics
- Comp. / Att.: 283 / 490
- Passing yards: 3,378
- TD–INT: 62–17
- Passer rating: 96.11
- Rushing touchdowns: 5
- Stats at ArenaFan.com

Thomas Alfred Maddox (born September 2, 1971) is an American former professional football player who was a quarterback in the National Football League (NFL) for nine seasons, most notably with the Pittsburgh Steelers. He also played one season each for the New Jersey Red Dogs of the Arena Football League (AFL) and the Los Angeles Xtreme of the XFL. In the XFL's only season, Maddox was the league's most valuable player (MVP) while leading the Xtreme to victory in the league's championship.

Maddox played college football for the UCLA Bruins and was selected by the Denver Broncos in the first round of the 1992 NFL draft. His first four seasons with the Broncos, Los Angeles Rams, and New York Giants saw limited playing time and minimal success, resulting in him being out of the NFL by 1997. Maddox became an insurance agent before pursuing a professional comeback in the AFL and XFL between 2000 and 2001. His MVP season with the latter saw him lead the league in passing yards and touchdowns, while being the only quarterback to start all 10 regular season games.

Following his XFL success, Maddox signed with the Steelers the same year. He became the team's starting quarterback during the 2002 season, helping lead them to the playoffs and earning Comeback Player of the Year. Maddox lost his starting position to rookie Ben Roethlisberger in 2004, although he was part of the team that won Super Bowl XL over the Seattle Seahawks. He was released by Pittsburgh after the championship, leading to his final professional retirement. Maddox is one of four players on the Xtreme's championship-winning team who were also on a Super Bowl-winning team.

== Early life ==
Born in Shreveport, Louisiana, Maddox graduated from L. D. Bell High School at Hurst, Texas in 1989. At L. D. Bell, Maddox lettered in football, basketball, and baseball. As a senior, he was team captain, and was named the Southwest Texas Offensive Player of the Year, District Most Valuable Player, and the Area Most Valuable Player.

== College career ==
Maddox played two seasons (1990–1991) of college football as quarterback at the University of California, Los Angeles. In 1990, he completed 182 of 327 (55.7%) of his passes for 2,682 yards, 17 touchdowns, and 14 interceptions. The Bruins went 5–6 in 1990. The following season, Maddox led UCLA to a 9–3 record and the 1991 John Hancock Bowl title with a 209-for-343 (60.9%) completion rate for 2,681 yards, 16 touchdowns, and 16 interceptions. In his two years with UCLA, Maddox became the first Pac-10 player to pass 5,000 yards by sophomore year. In a Friday night news conference on January 31, 1992, Maddox announced his intention to declare for the 1992 NFL draft, reading from a prepared statement: "While I fully understand that another year or two at UCLA would be enjoyable and beneficial to my development, I feel that it is time for me to stand on my feet as a man and take on the opportunities offered by the NFL." Maddox also announced his upcoming marriage and further explained: "Playing in the NFL has been a dream of mine since childhood, and it's a gut feeling that the time is now right."

== Professional career ==
=== Denver Broncos ===
==== 1992 ====
Maddox was selected by the Denver Broncos in the first round (25th overall) of the 1992 NFL draft. Covering the draft for television, Joe Theismann commented that Maddox should have stayed at UCLA for another year. Maddox was expected to succeed John Elway as starting quarterback. His selection by the Broncos did not sit well with Elway since the Broncos had greater needs at several other positions, which Elway felt should have been addressed with their first pick.

As a rookie, Maddox served under coach Dan Reeves. Maddox took his first snaps during the Week 6 (October 6) game against the Washington Redskins, completing 2-of-8 passes for 10 yards and one interception in the 34–3 loss. In that game, Maddox became the youngest NFL quarterback to complete a pass since Elmer Angsman in 1946. Maddox took over the week 11 (November 15) game after Elway left with a shoulder injury, and he led the Broncos to a 27–13 victory over the New York Giants.

Maddox would start the following four games from weeks 12 through 15, all losses. In his week 12 debut start, a 24–0 loss to the Los Angeles Raiders, Maddox went 18-of-26 (69.2%) for 207 yards and two interceptions (both by Terry McDaniel), was sacked four times, and committed three fumbles (including one lost). Maddox only learned that he would start three hours before kickoff. The Los Angeles Times account of the game reported: "Every time Denver moved the ball, Maddox would be pressured, sacked or simply dropped the ball." The following week, in a 16–13 loss to the Seattle Seahawks, Maddox threw his first touchdown pass professionally, connecting with wide receiver Mark Jackson.

==== 1993 ====
Under coach Wade Phillips, Maddox played all games in 1993 as the placekicker's holder. On Week 14 (December 5), in a 13–10 loss to the San Diego Chargers, Maddox completed one pass for one yard to linebacker Dave Wyman in a fake field goal attempt.

=== Los Angeles Rams (1994) ===
On August 27, 1994, the Los Angeles Rams traded a fourth-round 1995 NFL draft pick to the Broncos and acquired Maddox, as the salary cap forced the Broncos to trade him. Initially, Maddox was the Rams' third-string quarterback behind Chris Miller and Chris Chandler. With the Rams in 1994, Maddox played in five games as placekick holder and played as quarterback in two of those games. In an 8–5 loss to the Atlanta Falcons on Week 5 (October 2), Maddox was 7-for-15 in completed passes for 86 yards and 2 interceptions. In Week 12 (November 20), Maddox completed 3 out of 4 passes for one 55-yard drive to set up a field goal. This drive included a career-long 39-yard pass to Todd Kinchen. The Rams finished the 1994 season 4–12 and would move to St. Louis next season.

=== New York Giants ===
==== 1995 ====
Three days after the St. Louis Rams released him, Maddox signed as a free agent with the New York Giants on August 30, 1995, playing again under coach Dan Reeves. Maddox served as Dave Brown's backup and played all 16 games as the placekick holder. In three games, Maddox replaced Brown as quarterback. Maddox replaced an injured Brown in the second half of the Week 7 (October 15) game against the Philadelphia Eagles. Although Maddox completed his first pass, Maddox finished 6-for-23 for 49 yards, three interceptions, and one sack in the 17–14 loss. In the Week 12 (November 19) game, again against the Eagles, Maddox took over for Brown, late in the fourth quarter. Maddox was sacked once for four yards and lost one fumble.

==== 1996 ====
In the Giants' 24–17 victory over the Jacksonville Jaguars in the first exhibition game of 1996, Maddox played during the second half. In that game, Maddox fumbled his first snap from the line of scrimmage, and the Jaguars recovered that fumble. Maddox would repeat this mistake twice but would lead the game-winning drive.

Maddox started the second exhibition game of 1996, but the Giants lost that game 37–27 to the expansion Baltimore Ravens. Maddox was 5-of-10 for 42 yards, one touchdown, one interception, and two fumbles. The Giants released Maddox on August 20, 1996.

=== Atlanta Falcons and hiatus from football (1997–1999) ===
Maddox again joined coach Dan Reeves, this time with the Atlanta Falcons. However, Maddox was released after training camp on August 18, 1997. In an August 16 preseason game against Washington, Maddox threw for 35 yards, completing 4-of-11 passes. He also threw an interception to end a potential game-winning drive, and the Falcons lost 35-31.

On November 17 of that year, Maddox became an insurance agent with Allstate based in Dallas. In 1999, NFL Films did a feature on Maddox. While in Dallas, Maddox continued practicing football regularly and was a volunteer coach for his alma mater L. D. Bell High School.

=== New Jersey Red Dogs (2000) ===
After getting a phone call from the New Jersey Red Dogs of the Arena Football League in 1999, Maddox sold his insurance office and joined the team. With the Red Dogs, Maddox completed 284-of-490 passes for 3,800 yards, 64 touchdowns and 15 interceptions.

=== Los Angeles Xtreme (2001) ===
Maddox became the starting quarterback for the XFL team Los Angeles Xtreme during the first week of the season, despite the team using its first pick in the XFL draft on quarterback Scott Milanovich. Maddox made an impact in his time in the XFL. He was the only quarterback of the league to start all 10 regular season games, led the league in passing yards, touchdowns, rushed for two touchdowns, and led the Xtreme to the Million Dollar Game, also known as the "Big Game At The End." The Xtreme defeated the San Francisco Demons with a score of 38–6. Maddox was named the XFL MVP in 2001. The XFL folded after its inaugural 2001 season.

=== Pittsburgh Steelers ===
==== 2001 ====
Maddox signed with the Pittsburgh Steelers in 2001 as backup to Kordell Stewart. His first game action was in Week 7 (October 29) in a 34–7 win over the Tennessee Titans, in which Maddox completed one 57-yard pass to Troy Edwards. In the final game of the season on Week 17 (January 6, 2002), Maddox completed 6-of-8 passes for 97 yards, a touchdown pass to Bobby Shaw, an interception, a sack, and an eight-yard rush. The 2001 Steelers finished 13–3 and first in the American Football Conference Central Division and lost the AFC Championship game to eventual Super Bowl XXXVI champion New England Patriots.

==== 2002 ====
In Week 4, Maddox replaced Kordell Stewart at quarterback and led a come from behind win against the Cleveland Browns. With 2:02 left in regulation, Maddox ended a seven-play, 84-yard drive with a 10-yard touchdown pass to Plaxico Burress to tie the game. Steelers coach Bill Cowher officially named Maddox the starter on October 2, 2002. Maddox started his first NFL game since 1992 against the New Orleans Saints, which was a 32–29 loss. He went 22-for-38 passing, Maddox threw for 268 yards, three touchdowns, and one interception. He was sacked four times for 24 yards and lost a fumble. In Week 6 (October 13), Maddox won in his third start with the Steelers in a 34–7 victory over the Cincinnati Bengals. Maddox was 16-for-25 for 216 yards, one touchdown, two interceptions, and two sacks.

The Steelers played a Monday Night Football game on Week 7 with a 28–10 win over the Indianapolis Colts and quarterback Peyton Manning. Maddox passed 25-for-33 for 305 yards, three touchdowns and led the Steelers to touchdowns for the team's first three drives. Since an 0–2 start under Kordell Stewart, the Steelers had gone 4–1 under Maddox.

In Week 10 (November 10), the Steelers tied against the Atlanta Falcons, 34–34, the first tied NFL game since 1997. Maddox passed for 473 yards on 28-for-41 passing with four touchdowns and one interception. He was sacked once for three yards and rushed twice for seven yards. On the final play of overtime, Maddox completed a 50-yard pass to Plaxico Burress as time expired that ultimately came up one yard short of what would have been the game-winning touchdown. Maddox left the Week 11 (November 17) game, a 31–23 loss to the Tennessee Titans, in an ambulance after being tripped by Lance Schulters. Kordell Stewart played the following game in Week 12 (November 24), a 29–21 victory over the Cincinnati Bengals, while Maddox recovered from his injuries. Coach Bill Cowher chose to start Stewart the following game. Pittsburgh would win that Week 13 (December 1) game over the Jacksonville Jaguars 25–23. Maddox returned as starter in Week 14 (December 8), but the Steelers lost to the expansion team Houston Texans 24–6 as Maddox went down with six sacks and lost a fumble and had 30-for-57 passes for 325 yards and ended the game with a 55.1 quarterback rating. Aaron Glenn, Texans cornerback, returned two Maddox interceptions for 70 and 65 yards. Maddox, however, would lead the Steelers to victories in the final three games of 2002.

With 13 starts, Maddox led the Steelers into the playoffs as an aerial circus-type passing attack, with a 10–5–1 record in 2002. For the season, Maddox completed 234-of-377 passes (62.1%) for 2,836 yards, 20 touchdowns, and 16 interceptions. He was sacked 26 times for 148 yards, rushed 19 times for 43 yards, and committed eight fumbles (with three lost fumbles). Maddox's passer rating for 2002 was 85.2.

Rallying the Steelers from a 24–7 deficit, Maddox delivered a comeback 36–33 win over the Browns at home, on 30-of-48 passing for 367 yards, and three touchdowns, in the wild card round before a 34–31 overtime loss at the Tennessee Titans in the divisional round.

==== 2003 ====
Maddox led the Steelers to a Week 1 (September 7) 34–15 victory in Heinz Field over rival Baltimore Ravens and rookie quarterback Kyle Boller. With a 134.3 passer rating, Maddox completed 21-for-29 passes for 260 yards and three touchdowns. Hines Ward caught two of the touchdowns and Jay Riemersma caught the other one. Although Maddox passed for 336 yards the following game in a Week 2 (September 14) 41–20 loss to the Kansas City Chiefs, Maddox regressed statistically, with 28-for-47 passing, one touchdown, three interceptions, four sacks, and a 62.0 rating. In Week 3 (September 21), the Steelers beat the Cincinnati Bengals at home, 17–10. On 21-of-34 passing, Maddox passed for 240 yards, one touchdown, and one interception. Late in the second quarter, Maddox successfully completed a trick play called "Bengal", in which on field goal formation (fourth-and-three at the 50), Maddox took the snap on his knee and passed to Jerame Tuman, who advanced 23 yards to the Bengals' nine yard line. This trick play would lead to a touchdown and Steelers 7–0 edge at halftime. With 5:54 left in the fourth quarter, the Steelers ran down the clock the point where Maddox took a knee to seal the victory. Afterwards, the Steelers would lose five in a row and fall to 2–6 for the first half of the season. The five-game losing streak included a 33–13 loss in Week 5 (October 5) to rival Cleveland Browns, the team that Pittsburgh eliminated from the previous season's playoffs. On 11-of-24 passing for 136 yards and a 29.2 passer rating, Maddox threw two interceptions and lost one fumble; Cleveland cornerback Daylon McCutcheon returned one interception 75 yards for a touchdown. At Mile High Stadium on Week 6 (October 12), Pittsburgh lost 17–14 to the Denver Broncos. This game was Maddox's first interception-free game since Week 1, but Maddox was sacked seven times for 56 yards.

Alternating wins and losses in the second half of the season, the Steelers went 4–4 to finish 2003 with a 6–10 record. Maddox completed a 16-yard touchdown pass to Hines Ward with nearly one minute left in the Week 13 (November 30) game against the Cincinnati Bengals and put the Steelers up 20–17, but the Bengals would score a touchdown in the final minute to win 24–20 and dash any chance that the Steelers would make the playoffs. Although Maddox broke the team record this season for most single-season completions, the Steelers offense ranked only 22nd league-wide.

==== 2004 ====
In the first round of the 2004 NFL draft, the Steelers drafted quarterback Ben Roethlisberger as the 11th overall pick. The pick of Roethlisberger indicated that Maddox might have earned the lowest salary ($750,000) among all starting NFL quarterbacks. Consequently, Maddox negotiated salary raises with Steelers owner Dan Rooney before the draft.

Maddox started the first two games of 2004: a Week 1 (September 12) victory over the Oakland Raiders, 24–21, and a Week 2 (September 19) 30–13, loss to the Baltimore Ravens. Against Oakland, Maddox was 13-of-22 (59.1%) in passing for 142 yards. Maddox left the game against Baltimore with an elbow sprain in the third quarter, and Roethlisberger took over as quarterback. Roethlisberger was named the new starting quarterback as Maddox would be sidelined until November. As starter, Roethlisberger would lead Pittsburgh to a franchise-record 13-game winning streak but would go down with a rib injury during the Week 16 (December 26) 20–7 win over Baltimore, the game that marked the 13th straight win. (Baltimore defensive end Terrell Suggs caused both injuries to Maddox and Roethlisberger that forced them to leave their games against the Ravens.) Maddox played during the fourth quarter. In the game, Maddox completed one pass to Verron Haynes for no gain, and the Steelers relied mostly on running plays by Haynes, Jerome Bettis, and Hines Ward. This scheme allowed Pittsburgh to keep the ball for the last 7:45 of the game. Maddox would start the final game of the season on January 2, 2005 (Week 17) in a 29–24 win over the Buffalo Bills that eliminated the Bills from playoff contention. Maddox completed 12-of-24 passes for 120 yards, a touchdown, and two interceptions. The Steelers became the first AFC team in NFL history to finish the regular season with a 15–1 record. In the playoffs, the Steelers would advance to the AFC championship and lose to eventual Super Bowl XXXIX champion New England Patriots.

==== 2005 ====
In October 2005, Maddox returned as starter after Roethlisberger suffered a knee injury. In Week 6 (October 16), the Steelers lost Maddox's first start of the season to the Jacksonville Jaguars 23–17 as Maddox completed only 11 of 28 passes for 154 yards, 1 touchdown, and 3 interceptions. In a press conference following the loss, coach Bill Cowher stated he regretted not substituting third-stringer Charlie Batch for Maddox and not having Jerome Bettis in for more running plays. Cowher would demote Maddox to third string behind Batch. Maddox's next game would be in Week 10 (November 13), a 34–21 victory over the Cleveland Browns, in which Maddox completed 4 of 7 passes for 22 yards. As Roethlisberger was undergoing knee surgery, Maddox would next start on Week 11 (November 20) against the Baltimore Ravens. Pittsburgh lost to Baltimore 16–13 in overtime, and Maddox was 19-for-36 for 230 yards, a touchdown, an interception, and a lost fumble. Although Maddox led the game-tying touchdown drive with an 11-yard touchdown pass to Willie Parker, Maddox threw an interception to Terrell Suggs during the Steelers' final drive in regulation. This would be Maddox's final game of his career. The Steelers would win Super Bowl XL over the Seattle Seahawks in the postseason, but Maddox was among a handful of Steelers players, including linebacker James Harrison, who opted not to attend the ceremony at the White House honoring their Super Bowl championship. On March 3, 2006, the Steelers released Maddox for salary cap reasons.

=== Free agency (2006) ===
In September 2006, Maddox tried out for the Oakland Raiders.

Maddox signed a contract with the Philadelphia Soul of the Arena Football League but was waived in November 2006.

On December 8, 2006, Maddox worked out for the Dallas Cowboys.

== Career statistics ==
Legend
	Won the Super Bowl
**Bold**	Career high

=== AFL & XFL ===
Year	Team	Games			Passing							
Year	Team	GP	GS	Record	Cmp	Att	Pct	Yds	Avg	TD	Int	Rtg
2000	New Jersey Red Dogs	13	13	3−10	283	490	57.8	3,378	6.9	62	17	104.1
AFL career		13	13	3−10	283	490	57.8	3,378	6.9	62	17	104.1
2001	Los Angeles Xtreme	10	10	7−3	196	342	57.3	2,186	6.4	18	9	83.1
XFL career		10	10	7−3	196	342	57.3	2,186	6.4	18	9	83.1

=== NFL ===
Regular season

Year	Team	Games			Passing									Rushing					Sacks	
Year	Team	GP	GS	Record	Cmp	Att	Pct	Yds	Avg	TD	Int	Lng	Rtg	Att	Yds	Avg	Lng	TD	Sck	SckY
1992	DEN	13	4	0−4	66	121	54.5	757	6.3	5	9	38	56.4	9	20	2.2	11	0	10	60
1993	DEN	**16**	0	—	1	1	**100.0**	1	1.0	1	0	1	**118.7**	2	-2	-1.0	-1	0	0	0
1994	LAR	5	0	—	10	19	52.6	141	7.4	0	2	39	37.3	1	1	1.0	1	0	0	0
1995	NYG	**16**	0	—	6	23	26.1	49	2.1	0	3	13	0.0	1	4	**4.0**	4	0	2	7
2001	PIT	3	0	—	7	9	77.8	154	**17.1**	1	1	57	116.2	6	9	1.5	8	**1**	1	4
2002	PIT	15	11	**7−3−1**	234	377	62.1	2,836	7.5	**20**	16	**72**	85.2	**19**	**43**	2.3	**21**	0	26	148
2003	PIT	**16**	**16**	6−10	**298**	**519**	57.4	**3,414**	6.6	18	**17**	53	75.3	13	12	0.9	6	0	**41**	**242**
2004	PIT	4	3	2−1	30	60	50.0	329	5.5	1	2	39	58.3	9	15	1.7	10	0	6	37
2005	PIT	4	2	0−2	34	71	47.9	406	5.7	2	4	32	51.7	8	26	3.3	16	0	8	43
Career		92	36	15−20−1	686	1,200	57.2	8,087	6.7	48	54	72	72.4	68	128	1.9	21	1	94	541

Postseason

Year	Team	Games			Passing									Rushing					Sacks	
Year	Team	GP	GS	Record	Cmp	Att	Pct	Yds	Avg	TD	Int	Lng	Rtg	Att	Yds	Avg	Lng	TD	Sck	SckY
1993	DEN	1	0	0−0	3	7	42.9	34	4.9	0	0	13	58.0	1	1	1.0	1	0	0	0
2002	PIT	**2**	**2**	**1−1**	**51**	**89**	**57.3**	**633**	**7.1**	**5**	**3**	**40**	**84.2**	**2**	**7**	**3.5**	**8**	0	**4**	**33**
Career		3	2	1−1	54	96	56.3	667	6.9	5	3	40	82.2	3	8	2.7	8	0	4	33

=== College ===
Season	Team	Games (Note: Maddox’s statistics from his bowl game appearances are excluded, as bowl game statistics were not officially counted toward season or career totals prior to 2002.)			Passing								Rushing			
Season	Team	GP	GS	Record	Cmp	Att	Pct	Yds	Y/A	TD	Int	Rtg	Att	Yds	Avg	TD
1989	UCLA	0	0	—	Redshirted (redshirt)											
1990	UCLA	11	9	4–5	182	327	55.7	2,682	8.2	17	14	133.1	90	148	1.6	2
1991	UCLA	12	12	9–3	192	315	61.0	2,505	8.0	16	15	135.0	72	–33	–0.5	2
Career		23	21	13–8	374	642	58.3	5,187	8.1	33	29	134.1	162	115	0.7	4

== Post-football career ==
In 2007, Maddox scored a 75 at a local qualifier for the 2007 U.S. Open of golf, four over par; three under par was the cutoff for qualification.

Maddox was the assistant coach of the Grapevine High School baseball team that won the 5A Texas UIL State Championship in 2016 and was runner up in 2017. He was also an assistant coach for the Grapevine High School football team until 2017.

== Personal life ==
Maddox has two children: Kacy (born 1994) and Colby (born 1999). He is a Christian. In 2003, Maddox founded the Tommy Maddox Foundation for disadvantaged children.

== See also ==
- List of Arena Football League and National Football League players
