= Million Dollar Game =

Championship game of the 2001 XFL season

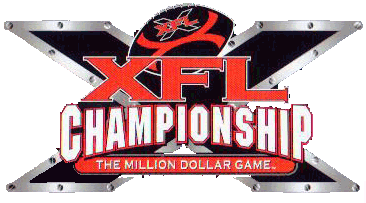
- "The Big Game at the End"
San Francisco Demons (6–6)	Los Angeles Xtreme (9–3)
6	38
Head coach: Jim Skipper	Head coach: Al Luginbill
	1	2	3	4	Total
SF	0	0	0	6	6
LA	3	18	10	7	38
- Date: April 21, 2001
- Stadium: Los Angeles Memorial Coliseum; Los Angeles, California
- MVP: José Cortez, placekicker
- Favorite: Xtreme
- Referee: David Witvoet
- Attendance: 24,153

TV in the United States
- Network: NBC
- Announcers: Matt Vasgersian, Jesse Ventura and Mike Adamle
- Nielsen ratings: 2.1

The Million Dollar Game, also known as the (2001 or 1st) XFL Championship, was the lone championship of the original 2001 incarnation of the XFL. The game was played on Saturday, April 21, 2001, at the Los Angeles Memorial Coliseum. Western Division champion Los Angeles Xtreme defeated the western runner-up San Francisco Demons 38–6.

The game's original name was the "Big Game at the End of the Season;" it was changed during Week 3 of the regular season due to wordiness and concerns over potential to be genericized. The "Million Dollar Game" name derived from the pot of one million dollars that would be split among the players of the winning team (with each team having 38 players, each player would receive approximately $26,316 for winning).

Less than a month after the championship, the league would cease operations following abysmal ratings along with NBC officially parting ways with the league. There would not be another XFL champion until 22 years later in which the Arlington Renegades would win the 2023 XFL Championship Game.

== Background ==
The Orlando Rage had finished the 10-game regular season with the XFL's best record, 8–2. Los Angeles was 7–3 while both San Francisco and the Chicago Enforcers each finished 5–5 (thus Orlando and L.A. were the only two teams out of eight to finish with winning records in the regular season; the Memphis Maniax were also 5-5 but San Francisco won the playoff berth on a tie-breaker). The last game of the regular season ended up serving as the western division championship; had the Demons won that game, they would have won the division on a tiebreaker with both teams at 6–4. Instead, Los Angeles won.

The 2001 XFL used a crossover playoff format: each division champion would host the second-place team in the other division (the XFL, as with the National Football League, features each team playing its division rivals twice in the regular season, and thus this format avoided making teams play a third time in a season, at least for the first round). Los Angeles defeated Chicago 33–16 in their semifinal, while San Francisco upset Orlando 26–25 in their semifinal.

== Game synopsis ==
The Xtreme, led by regular-season Most Valuable Player Tommy Maddox, won the Million Dollar Game 38–6. The Xtreme dominated the game and held the Demons scoreless until their third-string quarterback Oteman Sampson (pressed into service after Mike Pawlawski was pulled due to ineffectiveness and backup Pat Barnes suffered an injury) scored a scrambling touchdown in garbage time to avoid the shutout. Those looking for a tight contest quickly had their hopes dashed as the 32-point spread was the widest in the league's short history.

The game's MVP was Xtreme kicker José Cortez.

== Aftermath ==
The XFL folded shortly after the Game was played. Sparse attendance at the Coliseum was noticeable, as most of the television camera angles would only show close-ups of sections with fans and sideline interviews used distorted camera perspectives shot from near the ground to avoid the camera catching empty seats. A second XFL season would not be played until 2020.

After each had been released by National Football League teams earlier in their professional careers, both Maddox and Cortez eventually found themselves back in the NFL. Maddox signed with the Pittsburgh Steelers in 2001. He replaced Kordell Stewart in the 2002 season and led the Steelers into the playoffs. That performance earned NFL Comeback Player of the Year honors. Maddox lost his starting job to Ben Roethlisberger in 2004, and was released in 2006, however still became the first former XFL player to be a Super Bowl champion after the Steelers won Super Bowl XL over the Seattle Seahawks.

Cortez went on to become an NFL journeyman for the next five seasons playing two seasons each with the San Francisco 49ers (for whom he scored over 100 points in the 2001 and 2002 NFL seasons) and Minnesota Vikings; his final season in 2005 saw him play for five professional teams as a fill-in for injured kickers, four in the NFL and one in the Arena Football League.

== Game summary ==
2001 Million Dollar Game

Quarter	1	2	3	4	Total
San Francisco Demons	0	0	0	6	6
Los Angeles Xtreme	3	18	10	7	38

at Los Angeles Memorial Coliseum • Los Angeles, California

- Date: April 21, 2001
- Game time: 8:00 p.m. EDT
- Game weather: 62 °F (17 °C), sunny
- Game attendance: 24,153
- Referee: David Witvoet
- TV announcers (XFL on NBC): Matt Vasgersian, Jesse Ventura, and Mike Adamle

Game information
First quarter
- LA – José Cortez 37-yard field goal, 8:59. Xtreme 3–0. Drive: 9 plays, 18 yards, 4:10.

Second quarter

- LA – Josh Wilcox 1-yard pass from Tommy Maddox (Saladin McCullough 1-point run failed), 14:22. Xtreme 9–0. Drive: 9 plays, 79 yards, 4:49.
- LA – Reggie Durden 71-yard punt return (Tommy Maddox 2-point pass failed), 9:51. Xtreme 15–0.
- LA – José Cortez 34-yard field goal, Xtreme 18–0. Drive: 11 plays, 40 yards, 2:13.
- LA – José Cortez 50-yard field goal, Xtreme 21–0.

Third quarter

- LA – Jeremaine Copeland 19-yard pass from Tommy Maddox (Saladin McCullough 1-point run), 14:22. Xtreme 28–0. Drive: 2 plays, 25 yards, 9:37.
- LA – José Cortez 22-yard field goal, Xtreme 31–0. Drive: 11 plays, 44 yards, 1:31.

Fourth quarter

- LA – Latario Rachal 10-yard pass from Rashaan Shehee (Rashaan Shehee 1-point run), 3:48. Xtreme 38–0. Drive: 8 plays, 30 yards, 4:27.
- SF – Oteman Sampson 21-yard run, (Oteman Sampson 3-point pass failed) :25. Xtreme 38–6. Drive: 7 plays, 78 yards, 3:23.

== Statistics ==
Team statistical comparison
Statistic	SF	LA
Total plays–net yards	44–149	61–349
Rushing attempts–net yards	14–47	27–106
Yards per rush	3.4	3.9
Yards passing	102	243
Pass completions–attempts	11–27	18–34
Interceptions thrown	3	2
Punt returns–total yards	0–0	5–77
Kickoff returns–total yards	8–146	2–53
Punts–average yardage	5–34.6	1–42.0
Fumbles–lost	2–1	0–0
Time of possession	28:07	31:53

San Francisco statistics
Demons passing
	C–A	Yds	TD–INT
Mike Pawlawski	8/20	74	0–2
Pat Barnes	2/5	26	0–1
Oteman Sampson	1/2	15	0–0
Demons rushing
	Car	Yds	TD
Oteman Sampson	2	36	1
Kelvin Anderson	11	12	0
Mike Pawlawski	1	-1	0
Demons receiving
	Rec	Yds	TD
Jimmy Cunningham	6	71	0
Sean Manuel	2	12	0
Brian Roberson	1	15	0
Kelvin Anderson	1	11	0
Travis Moore	1	6	0

Los Angeles statistics
Xtreme passing
	C–A	Yds	TD–INT
Tommy Maddox	16–28	210	2–1
Scott Milanovich	1–4	23	0–0
Rashaan Shehee	1–1	10	1–0
Noel Prefontaine	0–1	0	0–1
Xtreme rushing
	Car	Yds	TD
Saladin McCullough	20	109	0
Rashaan Shehee	6	-1	0
Noel Prefontaine	1	-2	0
Xtreme receiving
	Rec	Yds	TD
Darnell McDonald	7	82	0
Jeremaine Copeland	4	67	1
Frank Leatherwood	2	36	0
Damon Gibson	2	21	0
Saladin McCullough	1	26	0
Latario Rachal	1	10	1
Josh Wilcox	1	1	1
