= 2001 XFL draft =

General information
- Date: October 28–30, 2000
- Location: Teleconference

Overview
- 475 total selections in 59 rounds
- League: XFL
- First selection: Scott Milanovich, QB, Los Angeles Xtreme

The 2001 XFL draft was the only draft for the first-iteration XFL football league. The draft took place over a three-day time period from October 28 to October 30, 2000, during which time a total of 475 players were selected by the league's 8 teams from a pool of approximately 1,600 or so eligible players. The draft consisted of 59 rounds—10 rounds taking place on October 28, 15 rounds on October 29, and 34 rounds on October 30.

The draft was followed by a supplemental draft on December 29, 2000, during which 65 additional players were selected in an effort to completely fill out team rosters. Most eligible players came from either the CFL, the Arena Football League, NFL Europe, retired NFL players, or previous college players who had gone undrafted by the NFL but had not yet signed with another league.

The XFL draft took place in order for teams to be ready to begin league play when the season kicked off on February 3, 2001.

== Notable players drafted ==
Many of the players selected in the XFL draft went on to compete in the NFL and other football leagues.

Notable players selected in the draft included Las Vegas running back Rod Smart, who first gained popularity because the name on the back of his jersey read "He Hate Me." Smart stated that he had wanted to put "They Hate Me" (a jab at his critics) but there wasn't enough room. Smart, who was only picked 357th in the draft, later went on to play for the Philadelphia Eagles, Carolina Panthers, and the Oakland Raiders, thus becoming the second XFL player (after receiver Yo Murphy did as a member of the St. Louis Rams in Super Bowl XXXVI) to play in a Super Bowl, participating in Super Bowl XXXVIII, which his team lost.

Many other XFL "alumni" who were selected in the draft went on to play in the NFL, including Kevin Kaesviharn, Jose Cortez, Corey Ivy, Mike Furrey and Rod Smart, and many others played extensively in the CFL, including Kelvin Anderson, John Avery, Duane Butler, Jeremaine Copeland, Marcus Crandell, Reggie Durden, Eric England, Paul McCallum (who wore the jersey nickname "CFL Reject"), Yo Murphy, Noel Prefontaine and Bobby Singh. The Arena Football League also absorbed some former XFL players.

== Player selections ==
Rnd.	Pick #	XFL team	Player	Pos.	College	Notes
1	1	Los Angeles Xtreme	Scott Milanovich	QB	Maryland	
1	2	Birmingham Thunderbolts	Casey Weldon	QB	Florida State	
1	3	Memphis Maniax	Marcus Crandell	QB	East Carolina	
1	4	Orlando Rage	Jeff Brohm	QB	Louisville	
1	5	Las Vegas Outlaws	Chuck Clements	QB	Houston	
1	6	San Francisco Demons	Vaughn Dunbar	RB	Indiana	
1	7	New York/New Jersey Hitmen	Charles Puleri	QB	New Mexico State	
1	8	Chicago Enforcers	John Avery	RB	Ole Miss	
2	9	Chicago Enforcers	Paul Failla	QB	Indiana (PA)	
2	10	New York/New Jersey Hitmen	Jermaine Smith	DT	Georgia	
2	11	San Francisco Demons	Scott Adams	T	Georgia	
2	12	Las Vegas Outlaws	Antonio Edwards	DE	Valdosta	
2	13	Orlando Rage	Dan Collins	G	Boston College	
2	14	Memphis Maniax	Darick Holmes	RB	Portland State	
2	15	Birmingham Thunderbolts	Michael Lies	G	Kansas	
2	16	Los Angeles Xtreme	Steve Russ	LB	Air Force	
3	17	Los Angeles Xtreme	Derek West	T	Colorado	
3	18	Birmingham Thunderbolts	Henry Taylor	DT	South Carolina	
3	19	Memphis Maniax	Mike Sheldon	T	Grand Valley State	
3	20	Orlando Rage	Jonathan Brown	DE	Tennessee	
3	21	Las Vegas Outlaws	Kory Blackwell	CB	UMass	
3	22	San Francisco Demons	Cordell Taylor	CB	Hampton	
3	23	New York/New Jersey Hitmen	Curtis McGee	T	Georgia Tech	
3	24	Chicago Enforcers	Julian Pittman	DE	Florida State	
4	25	Chicago Enforcers	Quincy Coleman	CB	Jackson State	
4	26	New York/New Jersey Hitmen	Tony Berti	T	Colorado	
4	27	San Francisco Demons	David Sanders	DE	Arkansas	
4	28	Las Vegas Outlaws	Antonio Dingle	DT	Virginia	
4	29	Orlando Rage	Derrick Clark	RB	Evangel	
4	30	Memphis Maniax	Mike Sutton	DE	LSU	
4	31	Birmingham Thunderbolts	Alonzo Wallace	DE	Maryland	
4	32	Los Angeles Xtreme	Donnell Day	CB	Cal State Northridge	
5	33	Los Angeles Xtreme	James Harris	DE	Temple	
5	34	Birmingham Thunderbolts	Justin Burroughs	G	NC State	
5	35	Memphis Maniax	Rico Clark	CB	Louisville	
5	36	Orlando Rage	Ricky Bell	CB	NC State	
5	37	Las Vegas Outlaws	Rickey Brady	TE	Oklahoma	
5	38	San Francisco Demons	Craig Powell	LB	Ohio State	
5	39	New York/New Jersey Hitmen	Dwayne Sabb	DE	New Hampshire	
5	40	Chicago Enforcers	Chike Egbuniwe	LB	Duke	
6	41	Chicago Enforcers	Tim Lester	QB	Western Michigan	
6	42	New York/New Jersey Hitmen	Mike Barber	LB	Clemson	
6	43	San Francisco Demons	Pita Elisara	T	Indiana	
6	44	Las Vegas Outlaws	Paul Bradford	CB	Portland State	
6	45	Orlando Rage	James Roberson	DE	Florida State	
6	46	Memphis Maniax	D. J. Cooper	DE	Arkansas	
6	47	Birmingham Thunderbolts	Stepfret Williams	WR	Northeast Louisiana	
6	48	Los Angeles Xtreme	Dell McGee	CB	Auburn	
7	49	Los Angeles Xtreme	Rashaan Shehee	RB	Washington	
7	50	Birmingham Thunderbolts	Duane Butler	DB	Illinois State	
7	51	Memphis Maniax	Basil Mitchell	RB	TCU	
7	52	Orlando Rage	Mario Bailey	WR	Washington	
7	53	Las Vegas Outlaws	Michael Mason	DE	Kentucky State	
7	54	San Francisco Demons	James Hundon	WR	Portland State	
7	55	New York/New Jersey Hitmen	James Cotton	DE	Ohio State	
7	56	Chicago Enforcers	Chris Ward	DE	Kentucky	
8	57	Chicago Enforcers	Jayson Bray	CB	Auburn	
8	58	New York/New Jersey Hitmen	Tyree Talton	CB	Northern Iowa	
8	59	San Francisco Demons	Emile Palmer	DT	Syracuse	
8	60	Las Vegas Outlaws	Lamont Burns	G	East Carolina	
8	61	Orlando Rage	Steve Fisher	CB	North Carolina	
8	62	Memphis Maniax	Ketric Sanford	RB	Houston	
8	63	Birmingham Thunderbolts	Kevin Landolt	DT	West Virginia	
8	64	Chicago Enforcers	Octavious Bishop	T	Texas	from Los Angeles
9	65	Los Angeles Xtreme	Willie Jones	T	Grambling State	
9	66	Birmingham Thunderbolts	Oliver Ross	T	Iowa State	
9	67	Memphis Maniax	O'Lester Pope	T	Southern Miss	
9	68	Orlando Rage	Jeremy Akers	T	Notre Dame	
9	69	Las Vegas Outlaws	Leroy Collins	RB	Louisville	
9	70	San Francisco Demons	Terrance Joseph	CB	Tulsa	
9	71	New York/New Jersey Hitmen	Jude Waddy	LB	William & Mary	
9	72	Los Angeles Xtreme	Jose Portilla	T	Arizona	from Chicago
10	73	Chicago Enforcers	Jamie Baisley	LB	Indiana	
10	74	New York/New Jersey Hitmen	Chris Maumalanga	DT	Kansas	
10	75	San Francisco Demons	Mike Adams	WR	Texas	
10	76	Las Vegas Outlaws	Chris Bayne	S	Fresno State	
10	77	Orlando Rage	Joe Cummings	LB	Wyoming	
10	78	Memphis Maniax	Jim Druckenmiller	QB	Virginia Tech	
10	79	Birmingham Thunderbolts	Sedrick Curry	CB	Texas A&M	
10	80	Los Angeles Xtreme	Jon Kirksey	DT	Sacramento State	
11	81	Los Angeles Xtreme	Steve Ingram	T	Maryland	
11	82	Birmingham Thunderbolts	Jimmy Sprotte	LB	Arizona	
11	83	Memphis Maniax	Glenn Rountree	C	Clemson	
11	84	Orlando Rage	Hayward Clay	TE	Texas A&M	
11	85	Las Vegas Outlaws	Toran James	LB	North Carolina A&T	
11	86	San Francisco Demons	Jim Arellanes	QB	Fresno State	
11	87	New York/New Jersey Hitmen	Anthony Brown	T	Utah	
11	88	Chicago Enforcers	Curtis Mayfield	WR	Oklahoma State	
12	89	Chicago Enforcers	Charles Wiley	RB	Georgia Tech	
12	90	New York/New Jersey Hitmen	Juan Daniels	WR	Georgia	
12	91	San Francisco Demons	Terry Battle	RB	Arizona State	
12	92	Las Vegas Outlaws	Donald Sellers	WR	New Mexico	
12	93	Orlando Rage	Kevin Swayne	WR	Wayne State	
12	94	Memphis Maniax	Earl Scott	C	Arkansas	
12	95	Birmingham Thunderbolts	Nicky Savoie	TE	LSU	
12	96	Los Angeles Xtreme	Brett Williams	DE	Clemson	
13	97	Los Angeles Xtreme	Nate Miller	C	LSU	
13	98	Birmingham Thunderbolts	Ed Smith	TE		
13	99	Memphis Maniax	Jeff Kerr	LB	East Carolina	
13	100	Orlando Rage	Ken Anderson	DT	Arkansas	
13	101	Las Vegas Outlaws	Brandon Sanders	DB	Arizona	
13	102	San Francisco Demons	Robert Hunt	C	Virginia	
13	103	New York/New Jersey Hitmen	James Battle	WR	Oregon State	
13	104	Los Angeles Xtreme	Leomont Evans	S	Clemson	from Chicago
14	105	Chicago Enforcers	Tony Ramirez	T	Northern Colorado	
14	106	New York/New Jersey Hitmen	Juan Porter	G	Ohio State	
14	107	San Francisco Demons	Kevin Jefferson	LB	Lehigh	
14	108	Las Vegas Outlaws	Hurley Tarver	CB	Central Oklahoma	
14	109	Orlando Rage	Jason Gamble	G	Clemson	
14	110	Memphis Maniax	John Williams	CB	Southern	
14	111	Birmingham Thunderbolts	Anthony Derricks	CB	Mississippi State	
14	112	Los Angeles Xtreme	Tom McManus	LB	Boston College	
15	113	Los Angeles Xtreme	Josh Wilcox	TE	Oregon	
15	114	Birmingham Thunderbolts	Billy Gustin	CB	Purdue	
15	115	Memphis Maniax	Hillary Butler	LB	Washington	
15	116	Orlando Rage	Cleave Roberts	G	Troy State	
15	117	Las Vegas Outlaws	Mark Nori	G	Boston College	
15	118	San Francisco Demons	Darran Hall	WR	Colorado State	
15	119	New York/New Jersey Hitmen	Ron Merkerson	LB	Colorado	
15	120	Chicago Enforcers	Roell Preston	WR	Ole Miss	
16	121	Chicago Enforcers	Larry Fitzpatrick	DL	Illinois State	
16	122	New York/New Jersey Hitmen	Bob Rosenstiel	TE	Eastern Illinois	
16	123	San Francisco Demons	Sam Manuel	LB	New Mexico State	
16	124	Las Vegas Outlaws	Blaine Berger	DT	Utah	
16	125	Orlando Rage	Sedric Clark	DE	Tulsa	
16	126	Memphis Maniax	Charles Jordan	WR	Long Beach City College	
16	127	Birmingham Thunderbolts	Ryan Thomassie	C	LSU	
16	128	Los Angeles Xtreme	Frank Leatherwood	FB	Appalachian State	
17	129	Los Angeles Xtreme	Curtis Eason	DT	East Tennessee State	
17	130	Birmingham Thunderbolts	Dion Foxx	LB	James Madison	
17	131	Memphis Maniax	Jerry Ross	TE	Pittsburg State	
17	132	Orlando Rage	Jay Hill	CB	Utah	
17	133	Las Vegas Outlaws	Mike Furrey	WR	Northern Iowa	
17	134	San Francisco Demons	Wendell Davis	CB	Oklahoma	
17	135	New York/New Jersey Hitmen	David Camacho	T	Oklahoma State	
17	136	Chicago Enforcers	Matt Finkes	LB	Ohio State	
18	137	Chicago Enforcers	Lovett Purnell	TE	West Virginia	
18	138	New York/New Jersey Hitmen	Rondell Jones	CB	North Carolina	
18	139	San Francisco Demons	Mario Bradley	CB	USC	
18	140	Las Vegas Outlaws	Sterling Palmer	DE	Florida State	
18	141	Orlando Rage	Andre Purvis	DT	North Carolina	
18	142	Memphis Maniax	Dee Moronkola	CB	Washington State	
18	143	Birmingham Thunderbolts	Steve Smith	WR	Utah State	
18	144	Los Angeles Xtreme	Reggie Lowe	DE	Troy	
19	145	Los Angeles Xtreme	Rico Mack	LB	Appalachian State	
19	146	Birmingham Thunderbolts	Graham Leigh	QB	New Mexico	
19	147	Memphis Maniax	A. J. Ofodile	TE	Missouri	
19	148	Orlando Rage	Scott Cloman	WR	Southern	
19	149	Las Vegas Outlaws	Johnny Huggins	TE	Alabama State	
19	150	San Francisco Demons	Ryan Christopherson	FB	Wyoming	
19	151	New York/New Jersey Hitmen	Dino Philyaw	RB	Oregon	
19	152	Chicago Enforcers	Ray Austin	CB	Tennessee	
20	153	Chicago Enforcers	Ronnie Powell	WR	Northwestern State	
20	154	New York/New Jersey Hitmen	Tyrell Peters	LB	Oklahoma	
20	155	San Francisco Demons	Trezelle Jenkins	T	Michigan	
20	156	Las Vegas Outlaws	Kelvin Kinney	DE	Virginia State	
20	157	Orlando Rage	Kelly Malveaux	CB	Arizona	
20	158	Memphis Maniax	Kevin Peoples	CB	North Carolina Central	
20	159	Birmingham Thunderbolts	Malcolm Hamilton	LB	Baylor	
20	160	Los Angeles Xtreme	Todd Doxzon	WR	Iowa State	
21	161	Los Angeles Xtreme	Latario Rachal	WR	Fresno State	
21	162	Birmingham Thunderbolts	Fred White	S	Tennessee	
21	163	Memphis Maniax	Patrick Sapp	LB	Clemson	
21	164	Orlando Rage	Joe Wesley	LB	LSU	
21	165	Las Vegas Outlaws	Isaac Davis	G	Arkansas	
21	166	San Francisco Demons	Greg Williams	DB	North Carolina	
21	167	New York/New Jersey Hitmen	Phil Savoy	WR	Colorado	
21	168	Chicago Enforcers	Benjamin French	OL	Rutgers	
22	169	Chicago Enforcers	Manuia Savea	OL	Arizona	
22	170	New York/New Jersey Hitmen	Damen Wheeler	CB	Colorado	
22	171	San Francisco Demons	Juan Johnson	RB	Utah	
22	172	Las Vegas Outlaws	Tyrone Taylor	WR	Sacramento State	
22	173	Orlando Rage	Lawrence Hart	TE	Southern	
22	174	Memphis Maniax	Marcus Wimberly	DB	Miami (FL)	
22	175	Birmingham Thunderbolts	Allen Mogridge	OL	North Carolina	
22	176	Los Angeles Xtreme	Jeff Russell	DB	Pacific	
23	177	Los Angeles Xtreme	Jeremaine Copeland	WR	Tennessee	
23	178	Birmingham Thunderbolts	Keith Council	DT	Hampton	
23	179	Memphis Maniax	Shante Carver	DE	Arizona State	
23	180	Orlando Rage	Mike Black	RB	Washington State	
23	181	Las Vegas Outlaws	Angel Rubio	DE	Southeast Missouri State	
23	182	San Francisco Demons	Sean Manuel	TE	New Mexico State	
23	183	New York/New Jersey Hitmen	Shay Muirbrook	LB	BYU	
23	184	Chicago Enforcers	Rob Murphy	OL	Ohio State	
24	185	Chicago Enforcers	Aaron Bailey	WR	Louisville	
24	186	New York/New Jersey Hitmen	Brad Trout	S	Valdosta State	
24	187	San Francisco Demons	Barrin Simpson	LB	Mississippi State	
24	188	Las Vegas Outlaws	Pat Kesi	T	Washington	
24	189	Orlando Rage	Brian Kuklick	QB	Wake Forest	
24	190	Memphis Maniax	Corey Sawyer	CB	Florida State	
24	191	Birmingham Thunderbolts	Steve Gleason	S	Washington State	
24	192	Los Angeles Xtreme	Bobby Singh	G	Portland State	
25	193	Los Angeles Xtreme	Keith Smith	QB	Arizona	
25	194	Birmingham Thunderbolts	Jahine Arnold	WR	Fresno State	
25	195	Memphis Maniax	Roosevelt Potts	FB	Northeast Louisiana	
25	196	Orlando Rage	Cory Gilliard	DB	Ball State	
25	197	Las Vegas Outlaws	Chrys Chukwuma	RB	Arkansas	
25	198	San Francisco Demons	Ben Nichols	OL	Colorado	
25	199	New York/New Jersey Hitmen	Zola Davis	WR	South Carolina	
25	200	Chicago Enforcers	Tyji Armstrong	TE	Mississippi State	
26	201	Chicago Enforcers	Andy Crosland	K	Miami (FL)	
26	202	New York/New Jersey Hitmen	Ben Cavil	G	Oklahoma	
26	203	San Francisco Demons	Dwayne Harper	CB	South Carolina State	
26	204	Las Vegas Outlaws	Martin Harrison	DE	Washington	
26	205	Orlando Rage	John Feugill	T	Maryland	
26	206	Memphis Maniax	Rashaan Salaam	RB	Colorado	
26	207	Birmingham Thunderbolts	Carlos Jones	CB	Miami (FL)	
26	208	Los Angeles Xtreme	Chad Pegues	DT	Illinois State	
27	209	Los Angeles Xtreme	Ken Oxendine	RB	Virginia Tech	
27	210	Birmingham Thunderbolts	Theodore McCall	CB	North Carolina	
27	211	Memphis Maniax	Tre Thomas	DB	Texas	
27	212	Orlando Rage	Chad Bates	G	Florida State	
27	213	Las Vegas Outlaws	Chris Kasteler	QB	San Jose State	
27	214	San Francisco Demons	Steve Johnson	CB	Tennessee	
27	215	New York/New Jersey Hitmen	Doug Brown	DT	Simon Fraser	
27	216	Chicago Enforcers	Jason Chorak	DE	Washington	
28	217	Chicago Enforcers	Kerry Cooks	S	Iowa	
28	218	New York/New Jersey Hitmen	Brandon Daniels	WR	Oklahoma	
28	219	San Francisco Demons	Ignacio Brache	K	California	
28	220	Las Vegas Outlaws	Carlo Joseph	FB	Miami	
28	221	Orlando Rage	Patrise Alexander	LB	Southwestern Louisiana	
28	222	Memphis Maniax	Nate Bell	DE	Southern	
28	223	Birmingham Thunderbolts	Troy Davis	RB	Iowa State	
28	224	Los Angeles Xtreme	Terry Billups	CB	North Carolina	
