= 1998 New York Jets season =

1998 season of NFL team New York Jets

- Owner: Leon Hess
- Head coach: Bill Parcells
- Offensive coordinator: Charlie Weis
- Defensive coordinator: Bill Belichick
- Home stadium: Giants Stadium

Results
- Record: 12–4
- Division place: 1st AFC East
- Playoffs: Won Divisional Playoffs (vs. Jaguars) 34–24; Lost AFC Championship (at Broncos) 10–23
- Pro Bowlers: QB Vinny Testaverde; RB Curtis Martin; WR Keyshawn Johnson; LB Mo Lewis; CB Aaron Glenn

Uniform
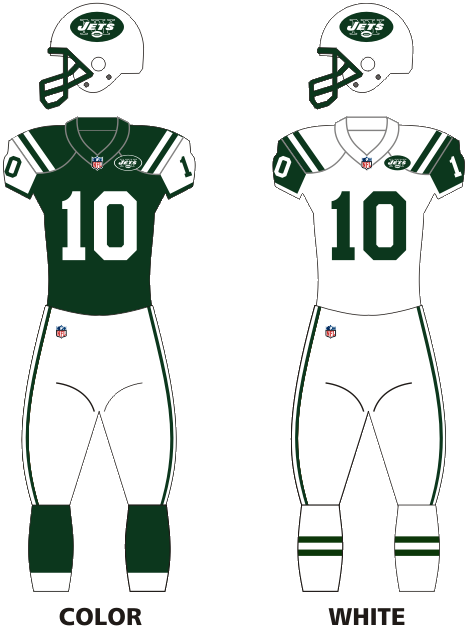

The 1998 New York Jets season was the 39th season for the team and the 29th in the National Football League (NFL). The team improved on its previous season by three games, finishing 12–4 in their second season under head coach Bill Parcells and their first playoff appearance since 1991, winning their first division title since the AFL-NFL merger in 1970; the 12–4 record was also the best in Jets history. This success came just two years after the Jets' 1–15 record in 1996.

The Jets earned a first-round bye, given to the two division winners with the best records, for the first time. They defeated the Jacksonville Jaguars 34–24, in the Divisional round of the playoffs, their first playoff win since 1986 and their first AFC Championship Game appearance in 16 years. Their attempt to reach their first Super Bowl in thirty years was halted by losing in Denver when the 14–2 Broncos scored 23 unanswered points in the second half.

The 1998 Jets are one of only two teams in NFL history (Note: The 1997 Packers are the other) to win seven games against teams that would go on to make the playoffs.

Vinny Testaverde threw for 3,256 yards, 29 touchdowns, and only 7 interceptions in 421 pass attempts (1.7%).

Curtis Martin rushed for a franchise record 1,287 yards, breaking the previous mark of 1,249 yards set by Adrian Murrell just two years prior.

The title game was the Jets' last title game appearance until 2009, although they returned to the playoffs in 2001, and qualified for the postseason four more times that decade.

== Offseason ==
In the offseason, the Jets signed New England Patriots running back Curtis Martin to an offer sheet. The Patriots had offered Martin, their star running back, a tender deal that would net them a first-round pick and a third-round pick if a team signed him. Jets coach and general manager Bill Parcells, who had left New England two years prior and still harbored some bad blood with the team, offered Martin a very large contract that the Patriots were unwilling to match, further fueling the rivalry between the teams.

In addition, the Jets parted ways with veteran quarterback Neil O'Donnell after two seasons and signed another veteran, Vinny Testaverde, to serve as backup to Glenn Foley. Testaverde eventually succeeded Foley as the starter and led the Jets to their division title. On defense, New York added former Miami Dolphins linebacker Bryan Cox.

The offseason also saw the first major overhaul of the Jets' uniforms and logos since 1978. The team changed its primary color from kelly green to hunter green, eliminated black which had been added in 1990 as a trim color, and abandoned the solid green helmets with the modern "JETS" wordmark in favor of white helmets with two green parallel stripes down the center, as worn from 1965 to 1977, but with a green facemask. The new primary/helmet logo resembles the 1965-77 version but is oval rather than football-shaped and has a somewhat "cleaner" appearance, with starker lines defining the word "JETS" in thick sans-serif italics in front of the "NY" in serif outline lettering, and the miniature football at bottom center. This logo was also added to the jersey front, by the player's left shoulder. The jerseys and pants also resemble the 1963-77 uniforms, with alternating shoulder stripes, opposite-colored sleeves and TV numerals, and two green parallel stripes from hip to knee on each side.

Additions	Subtractions
QB Vinny Testaverde (Ravens)	QB Neil O'Donnell (Bengals)
RB Curtis Martin (Patriots)	RB Adrian Murrell (Cardinals)
LB Bryan Cox (Dolphins)	WR Jeff Graham (Eagles)
C Kevin Mawae (Seahawks)	FB Lorenzo Neal (Buccaneers)
DE Anthony Pleasant (Falcons)	DE Hugh Douglas (Eagles)
	C Roger Duffy (Steelers)
	G Lonnie Palelei (Giants)

=== NFL draft ===
1998 New York Jets draft
Round	Pick	Player	Position	College	Notes
2	56	Dorian Boose	DE	Washington State	from Pittsburgh
3	67	Scott Frost	QB/S	Nebraska	from St. Louis
3	87	Kevin Williams	FS	Oklahoma State	from Pittsburgh
4	111	Jason Fabini	OT	Cincinnati	
5	134	Casey Dailey	LB	Northwestern	from Philadelphia
5	141	Doug Karczewski	G	Virginia	
5	146	Blake Spence	TE	Oregon	from Tampa Bay
5	149	Eric Bateman	G	BYU	from Pittsburgh
6	163	Eric Ogbogu	DE	Maryland	from Philadelphia
6	174	Chris Brazzell	WR	Angelo State	
6	183	Dustin Johnson	RB	BYU	from Denver
7	195	Lawrence Hart	TE	Southern	from St. Louis
Made roster

=== Undrafted free agents ===
1998 undrafted free agents of note
Player	Position	College
Geno Bell	Defensive tackle	Arkansas
Shannon Brown	Defensive tackle	Alabama
Cedric Donaldson	Cornerback	Louisiana Tech
Nakia Jenkins	Wide receiver	Utah State
Keith Lowzowski	Fullback	Northwestern
John Munch	Linebacker	Illinois Wesleyan
Brian Musso	Wide receiver	Northwestern
Victor Tuatagaloa	Defensive tackle	Henderson State
David Viger	Defensive tackle	Navy

== Roster ==
New York Jets 1998 final roster
Quarterbacks: 4 Glenn Foley; 6 Ray Lucas; 16 Vinny Testaverde; Running backs: 20 Richie Anderson FB; 41 Keith Byars FB; 28 Curtis Martin; 22 Dave Meggett PR; 33 Jerald Sowell FB; Wide receivers: 80 Wayne Chrebet; 19 Keyshawn Johnson; 86 Alex Van Dyke; 89 Dedric Ward PR; Tight ends: 84 Fred Baxter; 88 Kyle Brady; 82 Blake Spence	Offensive linemen: 66 Alex Bernstein G; 65 Jim Bundren G; 62 Todd Burger G; 76 Jumbo Elliott T; 69 Jason Fabini T; 67 Mike Gisler C/G; 71 Kerry Jenkins G/T; 60 Doug Karczewski G; 68 Kevin Mawae C; 70 Matt O'Dwyer G; Defensive linemen: 97 Dorian Boose DE; 72 Jason Ferguson DT; 92 Bobby Hamilton DE; 75 Carl Hansen DE/DT; 93 Ernie Logan DT; 95 Rick Lyle DE; 99 Eric Ogbogu DE; 98 Anthony Pleasant DE	Linebackers: 53 Chad Cascadden OLB; 51 Bryan Cox OLB; 58 James Farrior OLB; 54 Dwayne Gordon MLB/OLB; 50 Rob Holmberg MLB; 52 Pepper Johnson MLB; 57 Mo Lewis OLB; Defensive backs: 44 Corwin Brown CB/S; 42 Marcus Coleman CB; 47 Scott Frost FS; 31 Aaron Glenn CB/KR; 21 Victor Green SS; 30 Chris Hayes SS; 26 Jerome Henderson FS; 24 Ray Mickens CB; 45 Otis Smith CB; 23 Kevin Williams FS/KR; Special teams: 9 John Hall K; 65 John Hudson LS; 17 John Kidd P	Reserve lists: 94 Casey Dailey LB (IR); 78 Terry Day DE (IR); 32 Leon Johnson RB (IR); 55 Marvin Jones LB (IR); 56 Craig Powell LB (IR); 96 David Viger DT (Military Reserve); Practice squad: 61 Geno Bell DT; 87 Chris Brazzell WR; 34 Robert Farmer RB; 83 Lawrence Hart TE; 81 Brian Musso WR; 53 active, 6 inactive, 5 practice squad rookies in italics

== Regular season ==
=== Schedule ===
Week	Date	Opponent	Result	Record	Venue	Recap
1	September 6	at San Francisco 49ers	**L** 30–36 (OT)	0–1	3Com Park	Recap
2	September 13	Baltimore Ravens	**L** 10–24	0–2	Giants Stadium	Recap
3	September 20	**Indianapolis Colts**	**W** 44–6	1–2	Giants Stadium	Recap
4	Bye					
5	October 4	**Miami Dolphins**	**W** 20–9	2–2	Giants Stadium	Recap
6	October 11	at St. Louis Rams	**L** 10–30	2–3	Trans World Dome	Recap
7	October 19	at **New England Patriots**	**W** 24–14	3–3	Foxboro Stadium	Recap
8	October 25	Atlanta Falcons	**W** 28–3	4–3	Giants Stadium	Recap
9	November 1	at Kansas City Chiefs	**W** 20–17	5–3	Arrowhead Stadium	Recap
10	November 8	**Buffalo Bills**	**W** 34–12	6–3	Giants Stadium	Recap
11	November 15	at **Indianapolis Colts**	**L** 23–24	6–4	RCA Dome	Recap
12	November 22	at Tennessee Oilers	**W** 24–3	7–4	Vanderbilt Stadium	Recap
13	November 29	Carolina Panthers	**W** 48–21	8–4	Giants Stadium	Recap
14	December 6	Seattle Seahawks	**W** 32–31	9–4	Giants Stadium	Recap
15	December 13	at **Miami Dolphins**	**W** 21–16	10–4	Pro Player Stadium	Recap
16	December 19	at **Buffalo Bills**	**W** 17–10	11–4	Rich Stadium	Recap
17	December 27	**New England Patriots**	**W** 31–10	12–4	Giants Stadium	Recap
Note: Intra-division opponents are in **bold** text.

== Standings ==
AFC East
	W	L	T	PCT	PF	PA	STK
^{(2)} New York Jets	12	4	0	.750	416	266	W6
^{(4)} Miami Dolphins	10	6	0	.625	321	265	L1
^{(5)} Buffalo Bills	10	6	0	.625	400	333	W1
^{(6)} New England Patriots	9	7	0	.563	337	329	L1
Indianapolis Colts	3	13	0	.188	310	444	L2

== Season summary ==
=== Week 1 at 49ers ===
Week One: New York Jets (0–0) at San Francisco 49ers (0–0)

Quarter	1	2	3	4	OT	Total
Jets	3	14	7	6	0	30
49ers	7	7	9	7	6	36

at 3Com Park, San Francisco, California

- Date: September 6, 1998
- Game time: 4:15 p.m. EST
- Game weather: Sunny • 71 °F (21.7 °C) • Wind 14 miles per hour (23 km/h; 12 kn)
- Game attendance: 64,419
- Referee: Bernie Kukar
- TV announcers (CBS): Greg Gumbel, Phil Simms, Armen Keteyian
- FootballDB.com, Pro-Football-Reference.com

Game information

First quarter

- NYJ – John Hall 34-yard field goal, 11:34. Jets 3–0. Drive: 5 plays, 21 yards, 1:49.
- SF – Garrison Hearst 5-yard run (Wade Richey kick), 3:31. 49ers 7–3. Drive: 8 plays, 84 yards, 3:52.

Second quarter

- NYJ – Keyshawn Johnson 41-yard pass from Glenn Foley (John Hall kick), 10:11. Jets 10–7. Drive: 7 plays, 63 yards, 3:34.
- SF – J.J. Stokes 6 yard pass from Steve Young (Wade Richey kick), 2:11. 49ers 14–10. Drive: 7 plays, 63 yards, 3:05.
- NYJ – Wayne Chrebet 6-yard pass from Glenn Foley (John Hall kick), 0:33. Jets 17–14. Drive: 5 plays, 60 yards, 1:38.

Third quarter

- SF – Wade Richey 22-yard field goal, 9:05. Tie 17–17. Drive: 7 plays, 38 yards, 2:51.
- NYJ – Keyshawn Johnson 21-yard pass from Glenn Foley (John Hall kick), 7:15. Jets 24–17. Drive: 4 plays, 78 yards, 1:50.
- SF – Jerry Rice 14-yard pass from Steve Young (kick blocked), 3:03. Jets 24–23. Drive: 7 plays, 68 yards, 4:12.

Fourth quarter

- NYJ – John Hall 32-yard field goal, 3:28. Jets 27–23. Drive: 9 plays, 66 yards, 4:34.
- SF – J.J. Stokes 31-yard pass from Steve Young (Wade Richey kick), 1:26. 49ers 30–27. Drive: 5 plays, 76 yards, 2:12.
- NYJ – John Hall 31-yard field goal, 0:00. Tie 30–30. Drive: 12 plays, 60 yards, 1:26.

Overtime

- SF – Garrison Hearst 96-yard run, 10:52. 49ers 36–30. Drive: 1 play, 96 yards, 0:17.

Top passers

- NYJ – Glenn Foley – 30/58, 415 yards, 3 TD, INT
- SF – Steve Young – 26/46, 363 yards, 3 TD, INT

Top rushers

- NYJ – Curtis Martin – 22 rushes, 58 yards
- SF – Garrison Hearst – 20 rushes, 187 yards, 2 TD

Top receivers

- NYJ – Keyshawn Johnson – 9 receptions, 126 yards, 2 TD
- SF – J.J. Stokes – 7 receptions, 111 yards, 2 TD

=== Week 8 vs Falcons ===
Week 8: Atlanta Falcons at New York Jets

Quarter	1	2	3	4	Total
Falcons	0	3	0	0	3
Jets	7	7	14	0	28

at Giants Stadium, East Rutherford, New Jersey

- Date: October 25, 1998
- Game time: 1:00 p.m. EST
- Game weather: 65 °F (18.3 °C), relative humidity 46%, wind 11 miles per hour (18 km/h; 9.6 kn)
- Game attendance: 71,573

Game information

First quarter

- NYJ – Curtis Martin 2-yard rush (John Hall kick). Jets 7–0

Second quarter

- NYJ – Jerome Henderson 53-yard defensive fumble return (John Hall kick). Jets 14–0
- ATL – Morten Andersen 53-yard field goal, 0:01. Jets 14–3

Third quarter

- NYJ – Keyshawn Johnson 12-yard pass from Vinny Testaverde (John Hall kick). Jets 21–3
- NYJ – Keith Byars 22-yard pass from Vinny Testaverde (John Hall kick). Jets 28–3

Fourth quarter

- No scoring plays

Top passers

- ATL – Steve DeBerg – 9/20, 117 yards, INT
- NYJ – Vinny Testaverde – 16/29, 206 yards, 2 TD

Top rushers

- ATL – Jamal Anderson – 19 rushes, 46 yards
- NYJ – Curtis Martin – 25 rushes, 101 yards, TD

Top receivers

- ATL – Bob Christian, 3 receptions, 43 yards
- NYJ – Wayne Chrebet, 4 receptions, 54 yards

With Chris Chandler having injured his shoulder, the Falcons start 44-year-old Steve DeBerg, who had last played in the NFL in 1993 and became the oldest player to start an NFL game since Bobby Marshall in 1925. Bill Belichick's Jets shut down the Falcons' powerful running game with a nine-man defensive line, and DeBerg and reserve left-hander Tony Graziani cannot cope with the Jets' pass rush.

=== Week 11 at Colts ===
Week Eleven: New York Jets (6–3) at Indianapolis Colts (1–8)

Quarter	1	2	3	4	Total
Jets	3	20	0	0	23
Colts	10	0	7	7	24

at RCA Dome, Indianapolis, Indiana

- Date: November 15, 1998
- Game time: 1:00 p.m.
- Game weather: Indoors (dome)
- Game attendance: 55,520
- TV announcers (CBS): Ian Eagle & Mark May
- Box Score, Box Score

Team	Category	Player	Statistics
Jets	Passing	Vinny Testaverde	12/28, 249 Yds, TD, INT
Jets	Rushing	Curtis Martin	28 Rush, 134 Yds
Jets	Receiving	Wayne Chrebet	4 Rec, 112 Yds, TD
Colts	Passing	Peyton Manning	26/44, 276 Yds, 3 TD, 2 INT
Colts	Rushing	Marshall Faulk	20 Rush, 69 Yds
Colts	Receiving	Marvin Harrison	9 Rec, 128 Yds, TD

Scoring summary

Quarter	Time	Drive			Team	Scoring information	Score	
Quarter	Time	Plays	Yards	TOP	Team	Scoring information	NYJ	IND
1	10:17	7	19	2:36	Colts	31-yard field goal by Mike Vanderjagt	0	3
1	6:39	7	38	3:38	Jets	37-yard field goal by John Hall	3	3
1	3:25	6	40	3:14	Colts	Torrance Small 4-yard touchdown reception from Peyton Manning, Mike Vanderjagt kick good	3	10
2	14:02	7	74	4:23	Jets	Wayne Chrebet 63-yard touchdown reception from Vinny Testaverde, John Hall kick good	10	10
2	8:31	8	60	3:44	Jets	40-yard field goal by John Hall	13	10
2	0:22	12	62	5:00	Jets	25-yard field goal by John Hall	16	10
2	0:00				Jets	Missed field goal returned 104 yards for touchdown by Aaron Glenn, John Hall kick good	23	10
3	6:28	4	49	1:32	Colts	Marvin Harrison 38-yard touchdown reception from Peyton Manning, Mike Vanderjagt kick good	23	17
4	0:24	15	80	2:40	Colts	Marcus Pollard 14-yard touchdown reception from Peyton Manning, Mike Vanderjagt kick good	23	24
"TOP" = time of possession. For other American football terms, see Glossary of American football.							23	24

== Playoffs ==
=== Game summaries ===
==== AFC Divisional Playoffs: vs (3) Jacksonville Jaguars ====
AFC Divisional Game: Jacksonville Jaguars at New York Jets – Game summary

Quarter	1	2	3	4	Total
Jaguars	0	7	7	10	24
Jets	7	10	14	3	34

at The Meadowlands, East Rutherford, New Jersey

- Date: January 10, 1999
- Game time: 12:40 p.m. PDT
- Game weather: 28 °F (−2.2 °C) relative humidity 53%, wind 17 miles per hour (27 km/h; 15 kn), wind chill 16 °F (−8.9 °C)
- TV announcers (CBS): Verne Lundquist, Randy Cross, and Michele Tafoya

Game information

First quarter

- NYJ – Keyshawn Johnson 21-yard pass from Vinny Testaverde (John Hall kick), 10:26. Jets 7–0. Drive: 7 plays, 70 yards, 4:34.

Second quarter

- NYJ – John Hall 52-yard field goal, 10:35. Jets 10–0. Drive: 13 plays, 59 yards, 5:43.
- NYJ – Keyshawn Johnson 10-yard run (John Hall kick), 0:33. Jets 17–0. Drive: 11 plays, 65 yards, 4:36.
- JAX – Jimmy Smith 52-yard pass from Mark Brunell (Mike Hollis kick), 0:00. Jets 17–7. Drive: 3 plays, 63 yards, 0:33.

Third quarter

- NYJ – Curtis Martin 1-yard run (John Hall kick), 9:13. Jets 24–7. Drive: 7 plays, 40 yards, 3:06.
- JAX – Keenan McCardell 3-yard pass from Mark Brunell (Mike Hollis kick), 8:08. Jets 24–14. Drive: 4 plays, 4 yards, 1:05.
- NYJ – Curtis Martin 1-yard run (John Hall kick), 2:16. Jets 31–14. Drive: 9 plays, 70 yards, 5:52.

Fourth quarter

- JAX – Jimmy Smith 19-yard pass from Mark Brunell (Mike Hollis kick), 9:58. Jets 31–21. Drive: 8 plays, 64 yards, 3:30.
- JAX – Mike Hollis 37-yard field goal, 6:38. Jets 31–24. Drive: 7 plays, 22 yards, 2:20.
- NYJ – John Hall 30-yard field goal, 0:24. Jets 34–24. Drive: 4 plays, -4 yards, 1:35.

Top passers

- JAX – Mark Brunell – 12/31, 156 yards, 3 TD, 3 INT
- NYJ – Vinny Testaverde – 24/36, 284 yards, TD, INT

Top rushers

- JAX – Fred Taylor – 20 rushes, 86 yards
- NYJ – Curtis Martin – 36 rushes, 124 yards, 2 TD

Top receivers

- JAX – Jimmy Smith – 5 receptions, 104 yards, 2 TD
- NYJ – Keyshawn Johnson – 9 receptions, 121 yards, TD

==== AFC Championship Game: at (1) Denver Broncos ====
AFC Championship Game: New York Jets at Denver Broncos – Game summary

Quarter	1	2	3	4	Total
Jets	0	3	7	0	10
Broncos	0	0	20	3	23

at Mile High Stadium, Denver, Colorado

- Date: January 17, 1999
- Game time: 2:05 p.m. MDT
- Game weather: 37 °F (2.8 °C), relative humidity 36%, wind 20 miles per hour (32 km/h; 17 kn)
- TV announcers (CBS): Greg Gumbel, Phil Simms, Armen Keteyian, and Bonnie Bernstein

Game information

First quarter

- no scoring

Second quarter

- NYJ – John Hall 32 yard field goal. Jets 3–0

Third quarter

- NYJ – Curtis Martin 1 yard rush (John Hall kick) Jets 10–0
- Den – Howard Griffith 11 yard pass from John Elway (Jason Elam kick) Jets 10–7
- Den – Jason Elam 44 yard field goal. Tie 10–10
- Den – Jason Elam 48 yard field goal. Broncos 13–10
- Den – Terrell Davis 31 yard rush (Jason Elam kick) Broncos 20–10

Fourth quarter

- Den – Jason Elam 35 yard field goal Broncos 23–10

Jets

- Vinny Testaverde. 31-56, 356 yards, 0 TD, 2 Int
- Wayne Chrebet. 8 rec, 121 yards

Broncos

- John Elway. 13-34, 173 yards, 1 TD, 0 Int
- Terrell Davis. 32 rush, 167 yards, 1 TD

Turnovers:

- Jets – 6
- Broncos – 0
