= Kevin Jefferson =

American football player (born 1974)

No. 57, 64
- Position: Linebacker

Personal information
- Born: January 14, 1974 (age 52); Philadelphia, Pennsylvania, U.S.
- Listed height: 6 ft 2 in (1.88 m)
- Listed weight: 232 lb (105 kg)

Career information
- High school: Hempfield (Greensburg, Pennsylvania)
- College: Lehigh (1990–1993)
- NFL draft: 1994: undrafted

Career history
- Cincinnati Bengals (1994–1995); Green Bay Packers (1997)*; Rhein Fire (1998); Washington Redskins (1998)*; BC Lions (1999)*; San Francisco Demons (2001)*; Orlando Rage (2001); Carolina Cobras (2001); Chicago Rush (2002)*; Orlando Predators (2005)
- * Offseason or practice squad member only

Awards and highlights
- World Bowl champion (1998)

Career NFL statistics
- Tackles: 15
- Fumble recoveries: 1
- Stats at Pro Football Reference
- Stats at ArenaFan.com

Kevin Howard Jefferson Jr. (born January 14, 1974) is an American former professional football player who was a linebacker for two seasons with the Cincinnati Bengals of the National Football League (NFL). He played college football for the Lehigh Mountain Hawks. He started kindergarten at age 3, high school at 12, and college at 16, and made his NFL debut at 20. Jefferson was the youngest NFL player since Andy Livingston in 1964. Jefferson also played in NFL Europe, the XFL, and the Arena Football League (AFL).

== Early life and college ==
Kevin Howard Jefferson Jr. was born on January 14, 1974, in Philadelphia, Pennsylvania. He started kindergarten at the age of three, and began attending Hempfield Area High School in Greensburg, Pennsylvania when he was 12. He earned all-league honors in football and track in high school. He was also a letterman in gymnastics and basketball.

Jefferson majored in mechanical engineering at Lehigh University, and played college football for the Lehigh Engineers from 1990 to 1993. He was a four-year letterman and four-year starter at Lehigh. At 16 years old, he was the youngest starter in school history.

== Professional career ==
After going undrafted in the 1994 NFL draft, Jefferson signed with the Cincinnati Bengals on May 4. He was released on August 28, signed to the practice squad on August 30, and promoted to the active roster on October 4, 1994. He made his NFL debut at age 20, becoming the youngest NFL player since Andy Livingston in 1964. Overall, he played in six games for the Bengals during the 1994 season, posting five special teams tackles. He appeared in all 16 games in 1995, recording nine special teams tackle, one solo tackle on defense, and one fumble recovery. He was released on August 20, 1996.

Jefferson signed with the Green Bay Packers on March 4, 1997. He was released on August 4, 1997.

He played for the Rhein Fire of NFL Europe in 1998, totaling 35 tackles, 2.5 sacks, one interception, and three pass breakups. The Fire finished the season with a 7–3 record, and won World Bowl '98 against the Frankfurt Galaxy.

Jefferson was signed by the Washington Redskins on July 26, 1998, but later released on August 30, 1998.

He signed with the BC Lions of the Canadian Football League on March 11, 1999. He was placed on the team's suspended list after not showing up to the first day of Lions' training camp on June 13, 1999. He was released on June 29, 2000.

In October 2000, Jefferson was selected by the San Francisco Demons in the 14th round, with the 107th overall pick, of the 2001 XFL draft. He was waived by the Demons in late January 2001 before the start of the season. He was claimed by the Orlando Rage on February 21, 2001. Jefferson played in six games for the Rage during the 2001 season, posting one tackle.

Jefferson signed with the Carolina Cobras of the Arena Football League (AFL) on June 6, 2001. He played in four games for the Cobras during the 2001 season, totaling two solo tackles, two sacks, one pass breakup, two receptions for six yards, and five carries for 21 yards and two touchdowns. He was a fullback/linebacker during his time in the AFL as the league played under ironman rules. Jefferson was waived on January 10, 2002.

Jefferson was claimed off waivers by the Chicago Rush on January 11, 2002. He was waived on March 18, 2002.

Jefferson signed with the Orlando Predators of the AFL on January 17, 2005. He was waived on January 24, 2005, but later re-signed on April 6, 2005. He appeared in two games for the Predators that year.

== Personal life ==
Jefferson's father played college football at Millersville University.
