= Omar Brown (defensive back, born 1975) =

American football player (born 1975)

No. 27, 40
- Position: Safety

Personal information
- Born: March 28, 1975 (age 51); York, Pennsylvania, U.S.
- Listed height: 5 ft 10 in (1.78 m)
- Listed weight: 200 lb (91 kg)

Career information
- High school: William Penn (York)
- College: North Carolina (1993–1997)
- NFL draft: 1998: 4th round, 103rd overall pick

Career history
- Atlanta Falcons (1998–1999); Orlando Rage (2001)

Awards and highlights
- 2× Second-team All-ACC (1996, 1997)

Career NFL statistics
- Tackles: 15
- Stats at Pro Football Reference

Omar Lamont Brown (born March 28, 1975) is an American former professional football player who was a safety for two seasons with the Atlanta Falcons of the National Football League (NFL). He was selected by the Falcons in the fourth round of the 1998 NFL draft after playing college football for the North Carolina Tar Heels. Brown also played for the Orlando Rage of the XFL.

== Early life ==
Omar Lamont Brown was born on March 28, 1975, in York, Pennsylvania. He played high school football at William Penn High School in York, earning all-state honors at both running back and cornerback. As a senior, he totaled 78 tackles, five interceptions, 855 rushing yards, and 11 touchdowns. Brown also participated in basketball and track in high school.

== College career ==
Brown played college football for the North Carolina Tar Heels of the University of North Carolina at Chapel Hill. He was redshirted in 1993 and was a four-year letterman from 1994 to 1997. He recorded one interception in 1994, one interception in 1995, and two interceptions in 1997. Brown was named second-team All-ACC by the Associated Press in both 1996 and 1997. He played in 45 games during his college career, totaling 275 tackles.

== Professional career ==
Pre-draft measurables
Height	Weight	Arm length	Hand span	20-yard shuttle	Vertical jump	Broad jump	Bench press
5 ft 9 3/4 in (1.77 m)	198 lb (90 kg)	29 5/8 in (0.75 m)	9 1/4 in (0.23 m)	4.12 s	39.5 in (1.00 m)	9 ft 7 in (2.92 m)	14 reps

Brown was selected by the Atlanta Falcons in the fourth round, with the 103rd overall pick, of the 1998 NFL draft. He officially signed with the team on July 2. He spent most of the 1998 season on the inactive list but played in two games on special teams. Brown appeared in 13 games in 1999, posting 12 solo tackles and three assisted tackles. He was released by the Falcons on August 27, 2000.

Brown was selected by the Orlando Rage in the third round, with the 21st overall pick, of the XFL Player Allocation and Selection System draft. He played in all ten games, starting nine, for the Rage during the 2001 season, recording 46 solo tackles, four assisted tackles, 1.5 sacks, one interception, and one fumble recovery that he returned for a touchdown. The Rage finished the season with an 8–2 record but lost in the playoffs to the San Francisco Demons by a score of 26–25.
