= Sunview =

Sunview may refer to:

- Oaklawn-Sunview, Kansas
- SunView, the windowing system of SunOS
