= Brian Shay =

American football player (born 1977)

Profile
- Position: Running back

Personal information
- Born: February 22, 1977 (age 49); Paola, Kansas, U.S.
- Listed height: 5 ft 8 in (1.73 m)
- Listed weight: 213 lb (97 kg)

Career information
- High school: Paola High School
- College: Emporia State University

Career history
- 1995–1998: Emporia State
- 1999: Kansas City Chiefs (practice squad)
- 2000: Berlin Thunder (NFL Europe)
- 2001: Orlando Rage (XFL)

Awards and highlights
- Harlon Hill Trophy (1998)

Brian Shay (born February 22, 1977) is an American former football running back, who played for the Emporia State Hornets from 1995 to 1998. While at Emporia State, Shay broke various NCAA records and was the Harlon Hill Trophy winner in 1998. Shay is one of the all-time rushing leaders in the NCAA Division II.

== Early life ==
Shay attended Paola High School where he lettered in football and wrestling. While at Paola High, he helped lead the school's football team to go undefeated and win the Class 4A state football championship in 1994. Shay also won state in wrestling twice.

== College career ==
While at Emporia State, Shay broke many records at ESU, in the Mid-America Intercollegiate Athletics Association and the NCAA. During his four years, he was a three-time Division II All-America pick, and finished his career with six NCAA records including 6,958 rushing yards, 15 200-yard rushing games, 9,301 all-purpose yards, 88 total touchdowns, 81 rushing touchdowns and 544 total points. When Shay finished his senior year at ESU, he had broken 17 Division II records having averaged more rushing yards per game as a senior in 1998 and a few thousand yards rushing over his final three years.

Shay had 1,207 yards in punt returns, as well as 104 yards on kickoff returns. Shay was the 1998 Harlon Hill Trophy winner, which is the Heisman Trophy for Division II, and finished second for the same award in 1997 as a junior. As a senior, he ran for an ESU and MIAA record 2,265 yards with 29 rushing touchdowns. Shay finished college as one of the all-time leading rushers in college football history.

== Professional career ==
After college, Shay became an undrafted free agent with the Kansas City Chiefs in 1999 but later re-signed to spend five weeks on the practice squad in 2000. Shay then went on to play with the Berlin Thunder, a team in the NFL Europe league. Shay was the starting running back for the Thunder, finishing 3rd in the league.

== Honors ==
Shay has been inducted into several hall of fames, including:

- Kansas Sports Hall of Fame (Class of 2002)
- Kansas State High School Activities Association Hall of Fame (Class of 2016)
- The MIAA Hall of Fame (Class of 2016)
