= Brian Roberson =

American football player

No. 89, 8
- Position: Wide receiver

Personal information
- Born: January 8, 1974 (age 52); Los Angeles, California, U.S.
- Listed height: 5 ft 9 in (1.75 m)
- Listed weight: 168 lb (76 kg)

Career information
- High school: Sylmar (Los Angeles)
- College: Fresno State (1993–1996)
- NFL draft: 1997: undrafted

Career history
- New York Giants (1997)*; Fargo Freeze (2000); San Francisco Demons (2001); Saskatchewan Roughriders (2002–2003)
- * Offseason or practice squad member only

Brian D. Roberson is an American former record-setting wide receiver for Fresno State University and the XFL's San Francisco Demons.

== Early life ==
Roberson was a standout receiver/defensive back for the Sylmar High School Spartans during the 1990-91 seasons. As a Junior in 1990, Roberson caught 16 passes for 222 yards and 2 touchdowns, while also returning an interception for a touchdown. Roberson was named 1st team All-Valley Pac-8 conference as a junior.

As a senior in 1991, Roberson recorded 28 receptions for 464 yards and 5 touchdowns. His total of 15 touchdowns included a record-setting performance against Van Nuys, as he scored touchdowns four different ways: 29-yard reception, 30-yard run, 82-yard punt return, and a 98-yard interception return.

Roberson was named All-City 1st team, Valley Pac-8 conference 1st team, and was selected to play in the Daily News and 1st Annual Glendale vs. Burbank All-Star game. Roberson took official recruiting visits to Colorado State, Washington State, and Fresno State.

== College career ==
As a redshirt freshman at Fresno State in 1993, Roberson caught 5 passes for 50 yards, including a touchdown reception from Trent Dilfer. 1994 set the stage for what would turn out to be one of the most prolific receiving careers in Fresno State history. As a sophomore Roberson began to attract significant attention, catching 50 passes for 900 yards and 4 touchdowns, while earning All-WAC 2nd team honors. As a junior in 1995, Roberson was selected to the WAC 1st team, as he caught 55 balls for 758 yards and 5 touchdowns.

In 1996 Roberson elevated his game to another level with the departure of Charlie Jones to the NFL. A Pre-season All-American, he caught a Fresno State record 78 passes for 1,248 yards and 5 touchdowns.

== Professional career ==
Roberson signed a free-agent contract with the New York Giants in April 1997. An injury cut short his attempt to become the team's primary punt returner.

Playing for the Fargo Freeze of the Indoor Football League, Roberson was the team's leading receiver in 2000.

Roberson helped guide the San Francisco Demons to the 2001 XFL title game, catching 36 passes for 395 yards and 2 touchdowns. In his XFL debut he caught an XFL record 12 passes for 127 yards.

After the XFL folded, Roberson joined the Saskatchewan Roughriders of the Canadian Football League, hauling in 11 balls for 163 yards and a touchdown during the 2002 season. He caught six passes for 50 yards in 2003 before being released on July 18, 2003.
