= Derby USD 260 =

Public school district in Derby, Kansas

Address
- 120 E. Washington St. Derby, Kansas, 67037; United States
- Coordinates: 37°32′36″N 97°16′9″W

District information
- Type: Public
- Grades: K to 12
- Schools: 12

Other information
- Website: derbyschools.com

Derby USD 260, also known as Derby Public Schools, is a public unified school district headquartered in Derby, Kansas, United States. The district includes the communities of Derby, Oaklawn-Sunview, McConnell Air Force Base, small southern parts of Wichita, and nearby rural areas.

== Schools ==
The school district operates the following schools:

High school

- Derby High School (Panthers)

Middle schools

- Derby Middle School (Bulldogs)
- Derby North Middle School (Falcons)

Elementary schools

- Cooper
- Derby Hills
- El Paso
- Oaklawn
- Park Hill
- Swaney
- Tanglewood
- Wineteer
- Stone Creek

McConnell Air Force Base

On-post families at McConnell Air Force Base are assigned to Wineteer Elementary. Wineteer Elementary has an address for base housing, however, there is an entrance in a residential neighborhood on the south side of Pawnee.

== See also ==
- Kansas State Department of Education
- Kansas State High School Activities Association
- List of high schools in Kansas
- List of unified school districts in Kansas
