= Brian Roche (American football) =

American football player (born 1973)

No. 87, 85, 84
- Position: Tight end

Personal information
- Born: May 5, 1973 (age 53); Downey, California, U.S.
- Listed height: 6 ft 4 in (1.93 m)
- Listed weight: 255 lb (116 kg)

Career information
- High school: Damien (La Verne, California)
- College: San Jose State
- NFL draft: 1996: 3rd round, 81st overall pick

Career history
- San Diego Chargers (1996–1997); Kansas City Chiefs (1998–1999); Dallas Cowboys (2000); San Francisco Demons (2001)

Awards and highlights
- Second-team All-American (1995)

Career NFL statistics
- Receptions: 13
- Receiving yards: 111
- Stats at Pro Football Reference

Brian Roche (born May 5, 1973) is an American former professional football player who was a tight end in the National Football League (NFL). He played college football for the San Jose State Spartans, earning second-team All-American honors in 1995. Roche was selected by the San Diego Chargers in the third round of the 1996 NFL draft. He played in the NFL for the Chargers, Kansas City Chiefs and Dallas Cowboys.

== College career ==
Roche began his collegiate career with Cal Poly in San Luis Obispo; beginning his college career for the Mustangs in 1991. He then transferred to SJSU.

While majoring in communications pre-law, he was a 1995 second-team AP and Football News All-American at San Jose State, with 66 catches and 729 yards his senior year.

He played in the East-West Shrine Game and Hula Bowl after his senior season as well as attended the NFL Scouting Combine in Indianapolis, Indiana. His 40-yard dash time was clocked at 4.65 seconds.

== Professional football ==
Roche was drafted in the third round by the Chargers, selected with the 81st overall pick.

After playing 23 NFL games from 1996 through 1998, he later continued his career with the San Francisco Demons in the XFL in 2001.
