= Sam Manuel =

American football player (born 1973)

No. 48, 52
- Position: Linebacker

Personal information
- Born: December 1, 1973 (age 52); Richmond, California, U.S.
- Listed height: 6 ft 2 in (1.88 m)
- Listed weight: 235 lb (107 kg)

Career information
- High school: Pinole (CA) Valley
- College: New Mexico State
- NFL draft: 1996: 7th round, 254th overall pick

Career history
- San Francisco 49ers (1996)*; Denver Broncos (1998)*; Scottish Claymores (1998); San Francisco Demons (2001)
- * Offseason or practice squad member only

Sam Manuel (born December 1, 1973) is an American former football linebacker. He was the final pick in the 1996 NFL draft, earning him the title of Mr. Irrelevant. The San Francisco 49ers draftee played linebacker for New Mexico State University. Along with twin brother Sean Manuel, he is part of the first set of brothers taken by the same team in the same draft in NFL history.

== College career ==
At New Mexico State, he made 30 tackles for 108 yards in losses, including 8.5 quarterback sacks, starting in all but one of 33 games.

== Professional career ==
Manuel was drafted by the San Francisco 49ers in the 1996 NFL draft as the 254th overall pick, earning him the title Mr. Irrelevant, a humorous award given to the last player picked in the NFL Draft.

Manuel failed to make the team as it "had adequate depth at linebacker" and was released during final cuts, but was re-signed to the practice squad in October 1996.

In August 1997, he was again released by the 49ers, but with no commitment by the team's manager to re-sign him to the practice squad. This prompted his twin brother Sean to quit the team the following day.

In 1998, Manuel played for the Scottish Claymores of the NFL Europe league.

In February 2001, he was a linebacker on the roster of the San Francisco Demons, an XFL team.

== Personal life ==
After retiring from football, Manuel became a minister in northern California. As of March 2022, he and his wife Tenea are the East Bay Lead Ministers of the Bay Area Christian Church.
