= Billy Campfield =

American football player (born 1956)

No. 37, 35
- Position: Running back

Personal information
- Born: August 20, 1956 (age 70); Las Vegas, Nevada, U.S.
- Listed height: 5 ft 11 in (1.80 m)
- Listed weight: 200 lb (91 kg)

Career information
- High school: Derby (Derby, Kansas)
- College: Kansas
- NFL draft: 1978: 11th round, 288th overall pick

Career history
- Philadelphia Eagles (1978–1982); New York Giants (1983); San Antonio Gunslingers (1984)*; Arizona Outlaws (1985)
- * Offseason or practice squad member only

Career NFL statistics
- Rushing yards: 670
- Rushing average: 4
- Rushing touchdowns: 5
- Stats at Pro Football Reference

William Campfield (born August 20, 1956) is an American former professional football player who was a running back in the National Football League (NFL) for the Philadelphia Eagles and the New York Giants. He played college football for the Kansas Jayhawks and was selected in the 11th round of the 1978 NFL draft. He played in Super Bowl XV with the Eagles in 1981.

== Early life ==
Campfield graduated from Derby High School in Derby, Kansas, in 1974. He was a four-year letterman as a running back at the University of Kansas, averaging over six yards every time he touched the ball and scoring 12 career touchdowns.

== Professional career ==
=== Philadelphia Eagles ===
Campfield was selected by the Philadelphia Eagles in the eleventh round of the 1978 NFL draft. He was waived on August 22, 1983.

=== New York Giants ===
Campfield was claimed off waivers by the New York Giants, and he was released a week later on August 29, 1983.

=== San Antonio Gunslingers ===
Campfield signed a one-year contract with the San Antonio Gunslingers, and one week later, on March 6, 1984, announced his retirement.

=== Arizona Outlaws ===
Campfield came out of retirement and signed with the Arizona Outlaws on February 12, 1985.
