= Juan Johnson =

American football player (born 1976)

No. 23, 26
- Position: Running back

Personal information
- Born: January 28, 1976 (age 50); Columbus, Georgia, U.S.
- Listed height: 6 ft 1 in (1.85 m)
- Listed weight: 215 lb (98 kg)

Career information
- High school: Hunter (West Valley City, Utah)
- College: Utah (1994–1997)
- NFL draft: 1998: undrafted

Career history
- BC Lions (1998); Miami Dolphins (1999)*; BC Lions (1999); Amsterdam Admirals (2000); Tennessee Titans (2000)*; San Francisco Demons (2001); Toronto Argonauts (2002)
- * Offseason or practice squad member only

Awards and highlights
- CFL West All-Star (1998); Second-team All-WAC (1997)

Manwuan "Juan" Johnson (born January 28, 1976) is an American former professional football running back who played in the Canadian Football League (CFL), NFL Europe, and XFL. He played college football at Utah.

== Early life ==
Manwuan Johnson was born on January 28, 1976, in Columbus, Georgia. He played high school football at Hunter High School in West Valley City, Utah.

== College career ==
Johnson was a four-year letterman for the Utah Utes from 1994 to 1997. He was named second-team All-Western Athletic Conference as a senior in 1997. He finished his college career with totals of 582 carries for 2,601 yards and 22 touchdowns, and 22 receptions for 167 yards and two touchdowns. Johnson majored in family and consumer studies at Utah.

== Professional career ==
After going undrafted in the 1998 NFL draft, Johnson signed with the BC Lions of the Canadian Football League (CFL). He dressed in 15 games for the Lions during the 1998 season, rushing 156 times for 973 yards and eight touchdowns while also catching 33 passes for 235 yards and one touchdown. He led BC in rushing and was named a CFL West All-Star.

Johnson signed with the Miami Dolphins of the National Football League (NFL) on February 3, 1999. Despite still being under contract with the Lions, he was given permission to sign with Miami due to an NFL-CFL player agreement allowing players in the option years of their CFL contracts to sign with NFL teams. He was released by the Dolphins before the start of the NFL regular season. However, he was not allowed to sign with Miami's practice squad so he returned to the Lions to finish the 1999 CFL season. Johnson dressed in six games for BC in 1999, recording 28 rushes for 145 yards and three catches for 18 yards.

Johnson joined the Amsterdam Admirals with five games left in the 2000 NFL Europe season. He played in five games, starting one, for the Admirals, rushing 52 tims for a team-leading 230 yards while catching eight passes for 69 yards.

Johnson was signed by the NFL's Tennessee Titans on July 25, 2000. He was released on August 27, 2000, after suffering an injury.

In October 2000, Johnson was selected by the San Francisco Demons in the 22nd round, with the 171st overall pick, of the 2001 XFL draft. He played in all ten games, starting six, for San Francisco during the 2001 XFL season, totaling 33 carries for 172 yards, and 11 catches for 79 yards and one touchdown.

Johnson signed with the CFL's Toronto Argonauts on February 21, 2002. He played in one game for Toronto during the 2002 season, posting 12 carries for 45 yards, four kickoff returns for 36 yards, and five special teams tackles. He missed the rest of the year due to injury. Johnson was released on May 1, 2003.
