= Jamie Reader =

American football player (born 1974)

No. 34
- Position: Fullback

Personal information
- Born: May 4, 1974 (age 52); Washington, D.C., U.S.
- Listed height: 6 ft 0 in (1.83 m)
- Listed weight: 238 lb (108 kg)

Career information
- High school: Monessen (PA)
- College: Akron
- NFL draft: 1998: undrafted

Career history
- Arizona Cardinals (1998)*; Miami Dolphins (1998–1999)*; Scottish Claymores (1999); Philadelphia Eagles (1999-2000)*; San Francisco Demons (2001); New York Jets (2001)*; Philadelphia Eagles (2001)
- * Offseason or practice squad member only
- Stats at Pro Football Reference

Jamie Reader (born May 4, 1974) is an American former professional football player who was a fullback for the Philadelphia Eagles of the National Football League (NFL). He played college football for the Akron Zips. He played in the XFL for the San Francisco Demons before playing for the Eagles in 2001.
