= Albrey Battle =

American football player (born 1976)

No. 95, 97
- Position: Defensive lineman

Personal information
- Born: October 21, 1976 (age 50); Grand Rapids, Michigan, U.S.
- Listed height: 6 ft 4 in (1.93 m)
- Listed weight: 204 lb (93 kg)

Career information
- High school: Poway (Poway, California)
- College: Arizona State
- NFL draft: 1999: undrafted

Career history
- Tennessee Titans (1999)*; San Jose SaberCats (2000–2006); San Francisco Demons (2001); Arizona Rattlers (2007)
- * Offseason or practice squad member only

Awards and highlights
- 2× ArenaBowl champion (2002, 2004)

Career AFL statistics
- Tackles: 47.5
- Sacks: 7.5
- Pass deflections: 7
- Receptions: 5
- Receiving TDs: 2
- Stats at ArenaFan.com

Albrey Battle (born October 21, 1976) is an American former professional football defensive lineman who played eight seasons in the Arena Football League (AFL) with the San Jose SaberCats and Arizona Rattlers. He played college football at Arizona State University. He was also a member of the Tennessee Titans and San Francisco Demons.

== Early life ==
Battle played high school football at Poway High School in Poway, California. He earned all-CIF honors as an offensive lineman his senior year as the Titans finished with an 11–2 record and the Palomar League championship.

== College career ==
Battle started 27 of 41 career games for the Arizona State Sun Devils. In his Arizona State career, 32 of his 105 total tackles were for a loss.

== Professional career ==
Battle signed with the Tennessee Titans after going undrafted in the 1999 NFL draft. He was released before the start of the season.

Table played for the San Jose SaberCats of the Arena Football League (AFL) from 2000 to 2006, winning ArenaBowl XVI and XVIII.

Battle spent the 2001 season with the San Francisco Demons of the XFL.

Battle played his last season with the Arizona Rattlers of the AFL in 2007.

== Personal ==
NBA All-Star Sidney Moncrief is Battle's uncle.
