= Shannon Culver =

American gridiron football player (born 1971)

Profile
- Position: Wide receiver

Personal information
- Listed height: 5 ft 11 in (1.80 m)
- Listed weight: 170 lb (77 kg)

Career information
- High school: Palmdale (Palmdale, California)
- College: Los Angeles Pierce College (1990–1991); Oklahoma State (1992–1993)

Career history
- Baltimore Stallions (1994–1995); Montreal Alouettes (1996)*; Anaheim Piranhas (1997); Grand Rapids Rampage (1998); Los Angeles Avengers (2000); Orlando Rage (2001); Los Angeles Avengers (2001); Dallas Desperados (2002–2003); Austin Wranglers (2004); Arizona Rattlers (2006)
- * Offseason or practice squad member only

'Skinny' Shannon Culver (born October 5, 1971) is a former Canadian Football League wide receiver for the Baltimore Stallions (1994–95) Spring Football League Los Angeles Dragons (2000), XFL Orlando Rage (2001) and Arena Football League wide receiver for Anaheim Piranhas (1997), the Grand Rapids Rampage (1998), the Los Angeles Avengers (2000–2001), the Dallas Desperados (2002–2003), and the Austin Wranglers (2004). He then signed with the Arizona Rattlers after taking the 2005 season off. Culver played college football for the Oklahoma State Cowboys and Los Angeles Pierce College.

== Early life ==
Culver attended Palmdale High School in Palmdale, California, and was an All-League, and an All-CIF selection.
