= Derby, Kansas =

City in Sedgwick County, Kansas

- City
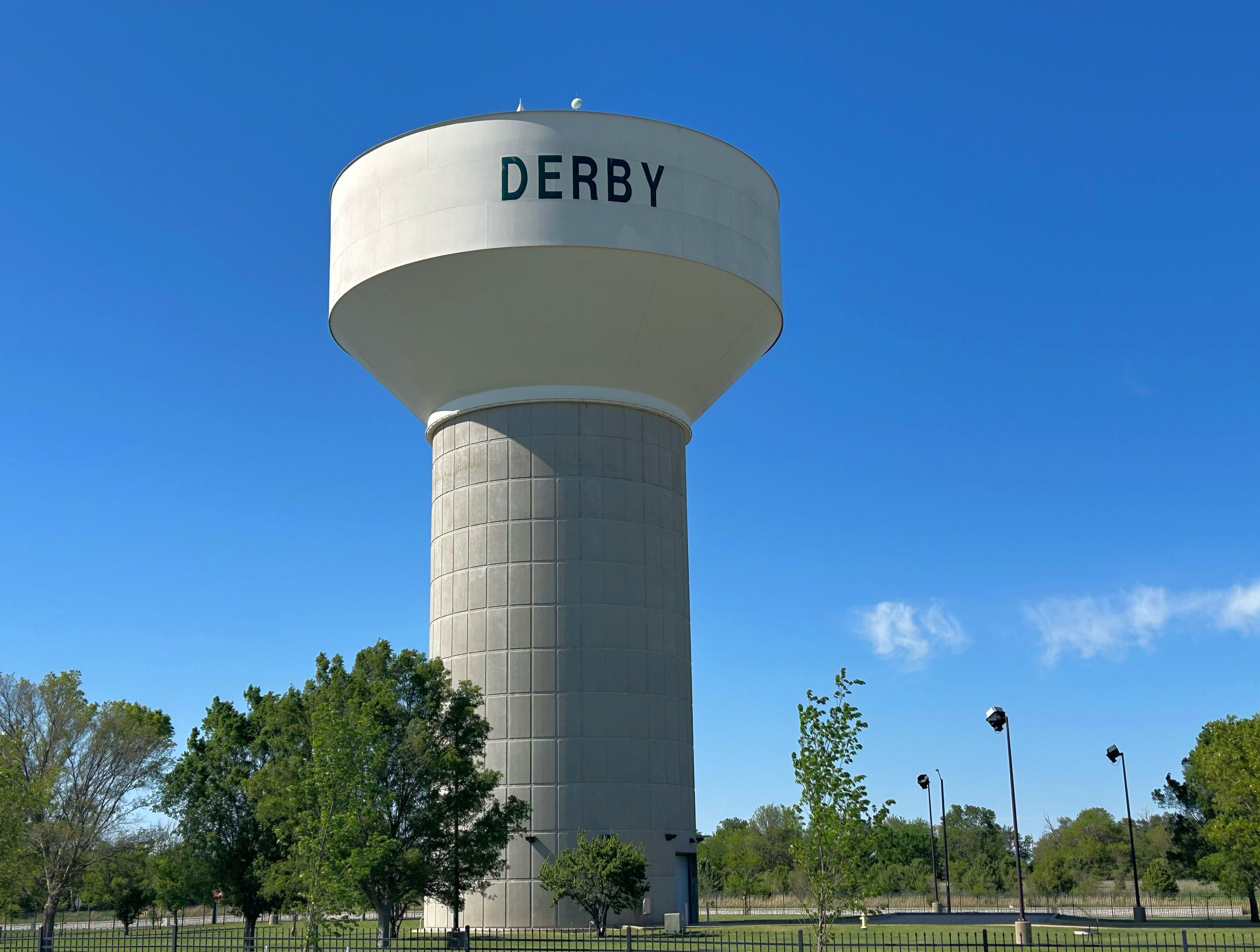
- One of three water towers in Derby

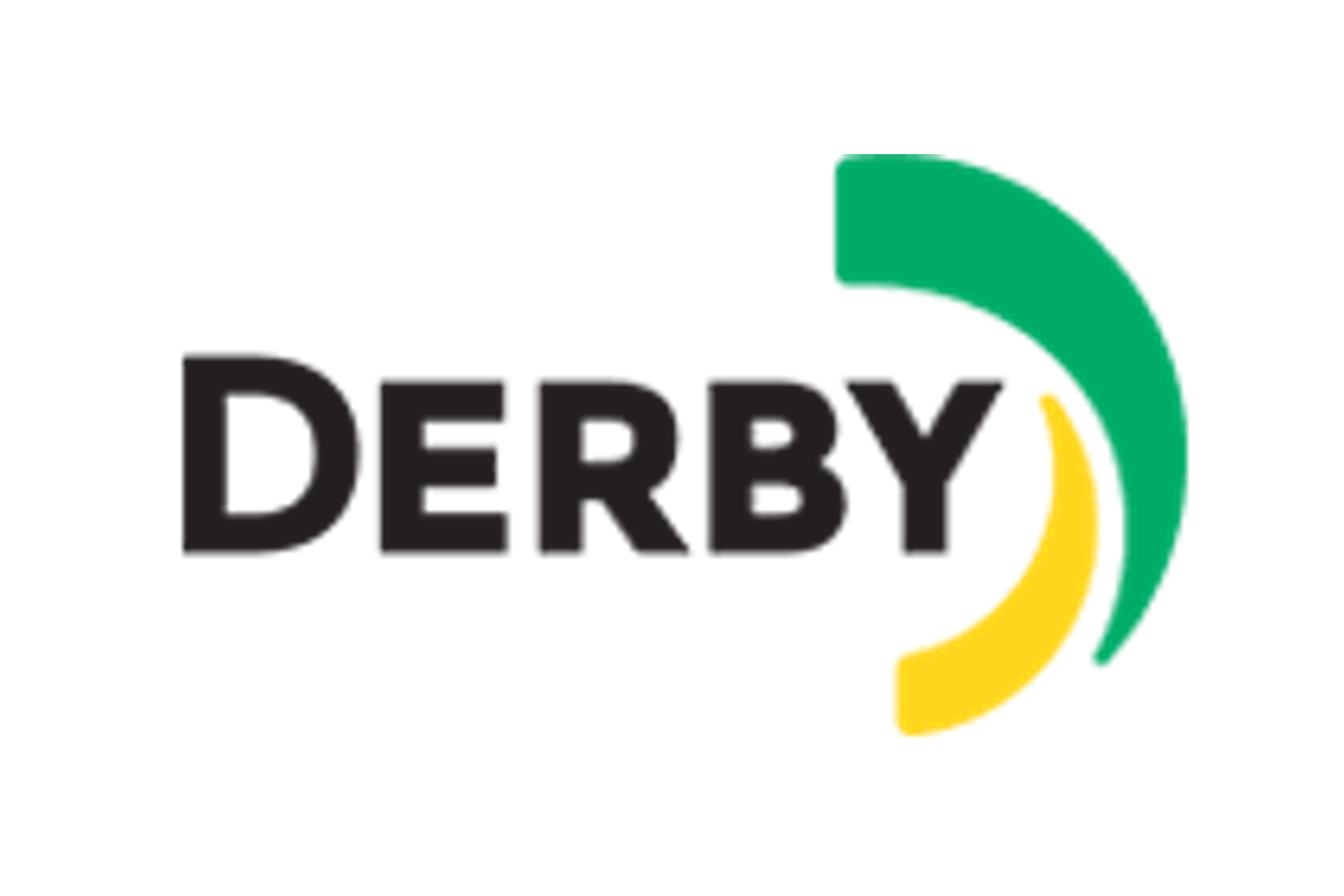
- Logo

- Location within Sedgwick County and Kansas
- Interactive map of Derby, Kansas
- Coordinates: 37°33′9″N 97°15′41″W
- Country: United States
- State: Kansas
- County: Sedgwick
- Founded: 1870s
- Platted: 1871 (El Paso)
- Incorporated: 1903 (El Paso); 1956 (Derby)
- Named for: C.F. Derby

Government
  - Mayor: Mark Staats

Area
  - Total: 10.32 sq mi (26.74 km^{2})
  - Land: 10.26 sq mi (26.57 km^{2})
  - Water: 0.066 sq mi (0.17 km^{2})
- Elevation: 1,293 ft (394 m)

Population (2020)
  - Total: 25,625
  - Density: 2,498/sq mi (964.4/km^{2})
- Time zone: UTC-6 (CST)
  - Summer (DST): UTC-5 (CDT)
- ZIP Code: 67037
- Area code: 316
- FIPS code: 20-17800
- GNIS ID: 474332
- Website: derbyks.gov

Derby is a city in Sedgwick County, Kansas, United States, and a southern suburb of Wichita. As of the 2020 census, the population of the city was 25,625, the largest suburb of Wichita.

== History ==
In 1870, settlers John Haufbauer and J.H. Minich built the first houses, smithies, and general stores on the site that would become Derby. In 1871, the community was named El Paso, after El Paso, Illinois, and was laid out and platted. In 1880, the Atchison, Topeka and Santa Fe Railway changed the name of its rail station to Derby, after railroad official C.F. Derby, to avoid confusion with El Paso, Texas.

In 1903, the city incorporated with the name El Paso, but the city remained largely a rural community until after World War II.

The aviation industry had begun its growth in Wichita during the 1920s, and when the demands of the war required more airplanes, businesses such as Boeing, Cessna and Beechcraft flourished. Boeing was located a few miles north of the city, which provided a close place for workers to live. Throughout the Cold War, Boeing maintained military contracts and kept jobs nearby. In 1952, the Air Force took over Wichita Municipal Airport and founded McConnell Air Force Base between Wichita and Derby. Many airmen found homes in Derby when space on base became occupied. From 1950 to 1956, the city population grew from 432 to approximately 5000 people.

In 1956, the city name was officially changed to Derby.

== Geography ==
According to the United States Census Bureau, the city has a total area of 9.60 square miles (24.86 km^{2}), of which 9.56 square miles (24.76 km^{2}) is land and 0.04 square miles (0.10 km^{2}) is water.

=== Climate ===
The climate in this area is characterized by hot, humid summers and generally mild to cool winters. According to the Köppen Climate Classification system, Derby has a humid subtropical climate, abbreviated "Cfa" on climate maps.

== Demographics ==
Historical population
Census	Pop.	Note	%±
1890	236		—
1910	235		—
1920	247		5.1%
1930	294		19.0%
1940	256		−12.9%
1950	432		68.8%
1960	6,458		1,394.9%
1970	7,947		23.1%
1980	9,786		23.1%
1990	14,699		50.2%
2000	17,807		21.1%
2010	22,158		24.4%
2020	25,625		15.6%
2023 (est.)	26,233		2.4%
U.S. Decennial Census; 2018 Estimate; 2010-2020

Derby is part of the Wichita metropolitan area, Kansas.

=== 2020 census ===
As of the 2020 census, Derby had a population of 25,625, with 9,991 households and 6,888 families.

The population density was 2,493.4 per square mile (962.7/km^{2}). There were 10,672 housing units at an average density of 1,038.4 per square mile (400.9/km^{2}).

The median age was 36.2 years; 25.9% of residents were under the age of 18, 8.8% were from 18 to 24, 26.5% were from 25 to 44, 22.3% were from 45 to 64, and 16.5% were 65 years of age or older. For every 100 females there were 95.4 males, and for every 100 females age 18 and over there were 92.2 males age 18 and over.

Of the 9,991 households, 34.2% had children under the age of 18 living in them. Of all households, 54.2% were married-couple households, 15.9% were households with a male householder and no spouse or partner present, and 24.2% were households with a female householder and no spouse or partner present. About 26.3% of all households were made up of individuals and 10.7% had someone living alone who was 65 years of age or older.

99.3% of residents lived in urban areas, while 0.7% lived in rural areas.

Racial composition as of the 2020 census
Race	Number	Percent
White	21,372	83.4%
Black or African American	618	2.4%
American Indian and Alaska Native	218	0.9%
Asian	478	1.9%
Native Hawaiian and Other Pacific Islander	21	0.1%
Some other race	421	1.6%
Two or more races	2,497	9.7%
Hispanic or Latino (of any race)	1,969	7.7%

Non-Hispanic White residents comprised 80.65% of the population.

=== 2016–2020 American Community Survey estimates ===
The 2016–2020 5-year American Community Survey estimated that the average household size was 2.7 and the average family size was 3.2. An estimated 24.8% of residents had a bachelor's degree or higher.

The median household income was $74,447 (with a margin of error of +/- $4,647) and the median family income was $87,805 (+/- $7,613). Males had a median income of $51,492 (+/- $3,241) versus $32,018 (+/- $3,530) for females. The median income for those above 16 years old was $41,332 (+/- $3,327).

Approximately, 5.6% of families and 6.4% of the population were below the poverty line, including 7.9% of those under the age of 18 and 6.9% of those ages 65 or over.

=== 2010 census ===
As of the census of 2010, there were 22,158 people, 8,300 households, and 6,226 families residing in the city. The population density was 2,317.8 inhabitants per square mile (894.9/km^{2}). There were 8,774 housing units at an average density of 917.8 per square mile (354.4/km^{2}). The racial makeup of the city was 91.6% White, 1.9% African American, 1.0% Native American, 1.6% Asian, 0.1% Pacific Islander, 0.8% from other races, and 3.0% from two or more races. Hispanic or Latino residents of any race were 5.2% of the population.

There were 8,300 households, of which 38.9% had children under the age of 18 living with them, 60.5% were married couples living together, 10.6% had a female householder with no husband present, 4.0% had a male householder with no wife present, and 25.0% were non-families. 21.3% of all households were made up of individuals, and 8.3% had someone living alone who was 65 years of age or older. The average household size was 2.66 and the average family size was 3.11.

The median age in the city was 34.7 years. 28.1% of residents were under the age of 18; 8.7% were between the ages of 18 and 24; 26.3% were from 25 to 44; 25.7% were from 45 to 64; and 11.4% were 65 years of age or older. The gender makeup of the city was 48.8% male and 51.2% female.

== Economy ==
Derby supports more than 532 businesses, ranging from modest home-based businesses to large manufacturing companies like BRG Precision Products, manufacturer of custom digital electronic clocks and emergency messaging systems, and Mid Continent Controls, manufacturer of cabin management and in-flight entertainment systems for business jets. The city's economy is strongest in construction, retail, finance/insurance/real estate, and health-care related activities. Aircraft manufacturers Spirit AeroSystems, Textron Aviation, and Bombardier Learjet provide jobs for a significant portion of the community's residents, as do Derby Public Schools and McConnell Air Force Base.

== Arts and culture ==
The Derby Public Library has over 100,000 items, and houses the Derby Business Center, which provides electronic business resources and services to Kansas residents.

== Parks and recreation ==
The city has bike and walking paths.

High Park features fishing, soccer fields, softball diamonds, walking paths, and an amphitheatre.

Annual events include Fourth of July, and Derby BBQ Festival.

Some Derby residents participate in Friends of McConnell and serve as Honorary Commanders at nearby McConnell Air Force Base.

The Derby Recreation Center features a fitness center, gymnasium, basketball and racquetball courts, and a pool.

Other attractions include:

- Rock River Rapids Aquatic Park.
- The Derby Historical Museum, located in a 1923 school building, featuring historical artifacts including an 1870 log cabin, one of the largest displayed collections of arrowheads in Kansas, a school room, a general store that has a collection of antique pharmaceutical items, and an original two-horse covered wagon that traveled to the Derby area from North Carolina in the 1860s.
- The Derby Skate Park.

== Government ==
Derby operates under the mayor-council-manager form of government.

== Education ==
The community is served by Derby USD 260 public school district.

Public schools:

- Derby High School
- Derby Middle School
- Derby North Middle School
- Cooper Elementary School
- Derby Hills Elementary School
- El Paso Elementary School
- Oaklawn Elementary School
- Park Hill Elementary School
- Pleasantview Elementary School
- Swaney Elementary School
- Tanglewood Elementary School
- Wineteer Elementary School
- Stone Creek Elementary School

Private Schools:

- St. Mary Catholic School (pre-K through 8th grade)
- Faith Lutheran School (pre-K through 7th grade)

== Media ==
The Derby Weekly Informer is a local newspaper.

Radio stations KZCH, and television station KDCU-DT, are licensed to Derby, and broadcast from Wichita.

== Infrastructure ==
The Derby Dash provides point-to-point bus transportation to residents within city limits.

== Notable people ==
- Woody Austin, pro golfer
- Billy Campfield, football running back
- Caitlynn French, voice actress
- Jason Gamble, football offensive guard
- Sherrone Moore, football coach
- Nick Reid, football linebacker
- David Rickels, mixed martial artist
- Grant Snider, cartoonist
- George Teague, football safety
