= Jim Skipper =

American football coach (born 1949)

Personal information
- Born: January 23, 1949 (age 77); Breaux Bridge, Louisiana, U.S.

Career information
- High school: Brawley (CA) Union
- College: Whittier

Career history
- Cal Poly Pomona (1974–1976) Defensive backs coach; San Jose State (1977–1978) Defensive backs coach; Pacific (1979) Running backs coach; Oregon (1980–1982) Running backs coach; Philadelphia/Baltimore Stars (1983–1985) Running backs coach; New Orleans Saints (1986–1995) Running backs coach; Arizona Cardinals (1996) Running backs coach; New York Giants (1997–2000) Running backs coach & offensive coordinator; San Francisco Demons (2001) Head coach; Carolina Panthers (2002–2010) Running backs coach; Tennessee Titans (2011–2012) Running backs coach; Carolina Panthers (2013–2018) Running backs coach
- Coaching profile at Pro Football Reference

James Augustine Skipper (born January 23, 1949) is an American former football coach who was best known for being the running backs coach for the Carolina Panthers of the National Football League (NFL) for 15 years (over two separate stretches). He was also the offensive coordinator for the New York Giants for three years, starting in 1997.

== Early life ==
A native of Brawley, California, Skipper was an all-conference selection at Imperial Valley College, where he led the league in kickoff returns. He then transferred to Whittier College, where he played defensive back and he paced the conference in punt returns during his career. Skipper holds a B.A. degree in physical education from Whittier.

== Coaching career ==
Skipper began his coaching career at California State Polytechnic University, Pomona, where he coached the defensive backs from 1974 to 1976. After coaching the defensive backs for two seasons at San Jose State University, Skipper moved to the offensive side of the ball, coaching the running backs at University of the Pacific in 1979. He then went on to coach the running backs at University of Oregon from 1980 to 1982 before he made the jump to the professional ranks.

Skipper started his professional coaching career with the Philadelphia/Baltimore Stars of the United States Football League from 1983 to 1985. He then moved on to the National Football League with the New Orleans Saints - serving under Jim Mora in both roles.

Starting in 1986, Skipper served as the running back coach till 1995. During his 10-year tenure with New Orleans, Skipper coached two Pro Bowlers, Rueben Mayes in 1986 and 1987 and Dalton Hilliard in 1989. Mayes' 1,353 yards in 1986 and Hilliard's 1,262 in 1989 still stand among the 10 highest single-season rushing totals in Saints history.

Skipper took the head coaching role for the San Francisco Demons of the original incarnation of the XFL in 2001. He led the Demons to a 6–6 record and an appearance in the only Million Dollar Game would ever hold, won by Los Angeles Xtreme 38–6.

Skipper became the running backs coach for the Carolina Panthers since 2002. In 2009, Skipper helped make NFL history as two of his running backs, DeAngelo Williams and Jonathan Stewart, became the first set of teammates ever to rush for over 1,100 yards in the same season.

He was announced as the running backs coach for the Tennessee Titans on February 18, 2011. He returned to the Carolina Panthers coaching staff in 2013, coaching running backs.

In the 2015 season, Skipper and the Panthers reached Super Bowl 50 on February 7, 2016. The Panthers fell to the Denver Broncos by a score of 24–10.

After the 2018 season, Skipper announced his retirement from coaching.

== Personal ==
He has two sons, who are also football coaches: Tim Skipper, currently the head coach at Cal Poly and Kelly Skipper, currently the running backs coach for the Buffalo Bills.

== Head coaching record ==
=== XFL ===
Team	Year	Regular season					Postseason			
Team	Year	Won	Lost	Ties	Win %	Finish	Won	Lost	Win %	Result
SF	2001	5	5	0	.500	2nd in Western Division	1	1	.500	Lost in Million Dollar Game
Total		5	5	0	.500		1	1	.500	

== Pro Bowl running backs under Jim Skipper ==
- Rueben Mayes- 1986 & 1987
- Dalton Hilliard- 1989
- Larry Centers- 1996
- Stephen Davis- 2003
- DeAngelo Williams- 2009
- Mike Tolbert- 2013, 2015 & 2016
- Jonathan Stewart- 2015

== 1,000 yard rushers under Jim Skipper ==
- Rueben Mayes- 1986
- Dalton Hilliard- 1989
- Gary Brown- 1998
- Tiki Barber- 2000
- Stephen Davis- 2003
- DeAngelo Williams- 2008
- Jonathan Stewart- 2009
- DeAngelo Williams- 2009
- Chris Johnson- 2011 & 2012
- Christian McCaffrey- 2018
