= Pita Elisara =

Samoan gridiron football player (1976–2018)

No. 73
- Position: Tackle / Guard

Personal information
- Born: November 16, 1976 ʻIliʻili, American Samoa
- Died: October 16, 2018 (aged 41); Del City, Oklahoma, U.S.
- Listed height: 6 ft 4 in (1.93 m)
- Listed weight: 287 lb (130 kg)

Career information
- High school: Tafuna (Tafuna, American Samoa)
- College: Indiana
- NFL draft: 2000: undrafted

Career history
- New York Giants (2000)*; San Francisco Demons (2001); Philadelphia Eagles (2002)*; → Scottish Claymores (2002); Baltimore Ravens (2003)*; Washington Redskins (2003–2004); → Rhein Fire (2004)
- * Offseason or practice squad member only

Awards and highlights
- All-Big Ten Honorable Mention (1998)

Pita Elisara (November 16, 1976 – October 16, 2018) was an American football offensive lineman.

A native of American Samoa, Elisara grew up playing rugby and football. After high school, he spent two years at Palomar College while living with some of his brothers, who were serving in the US Navy, in Oceanside, California. In 1998, he transferred to Indiana University, where he became an All-Big Ten offensive lineman. He started all 11 games in 1999 for the Hoosiers.

Being not selected in the 2000 NFL draft, Elisara was signed onto the New York Giants off-season roster, but eventually cut. He was then selected in the 2001 XFL draft by the short-lived San Francisco Demons. The following years he spent on several NFL teams' off-season roster, while being assigned to NFL Europe squads during the season.

He died on October 16, 2018, in Del City, Oklahoma.
