= Tom Veit =

American sports executive

- Born: Tampa, Florida
- Occupation: Sports executive

Tom Veit is an American sports executive, mainly working in professional American soccer and football leagues, from Tampa, Florida.

== Background ==
Veit graduated from the University of South Florida with a degree in government and international affairs in 1993.

He worked for Pace Entertainment, promoting motorsport events across the United States while also working for the Tampa Bay Storm, later as its Director of Marketing & Operations.

He also worked for Clear Channel Communications, and served as the Senior Vice President of Sales and Marketing for the Tampa Bay Mutiny, a Major League Soccer (MLS) team, where he revamped the team's front office and led the largest single year revenue turnaround in MLS history at that time.

After the formation of the XFL in 2000, Veit was named vice president and general manager of the Orlando Rage.

After the league's only season, Veit joined USF as the associate athletics director, where he oversaw the redesign of the school's logo.

In 2008, he became the founding president of the Philadelphia Union of the MLS. He stepped down as president in 2010 and was named the Primary Business Consultant.

In 2011, he became the Senior Vice President of Live Events at WWE, where he oversaw ticket sales, marketing, and event booking.

In 2015, Veit was named the Chief Marketing Officer of the United Soccer League (USL) and its properties, which included the PDL, W-League, and Super Y League. He was later named Executive Vice President and Chief Revenue Officer, and led the USL to Division II status, granted by the United States Soccer Federation (USSF).

In 2018, the Alliance of American Football named Veit the league's head of business operations.
