= Toby Wright (American football) =

American football player (born 1970)

No. 32
- Position: Safety

Personal information
- Born: November 19, 1970 (age 55); Phoenix, Arizona, U.S.
- Listed height: 5 ft 11 in (1.80 m)
- Listed weight: 212 lb (96 kg)

Career information
- High school: Dobson (Mesa, Arizona)
- College: Nebraska
- NFL draft: 1994: 2nd round, 49th overall pick

Career history
- Los Angeles / St. Louis Rams (1994–1998); Washington Redskins (1999); San Francisco Demons (2001)

Career NFL statistics
- Interceptions: 7
- Forced fumbles: 4
- Touchdowns: 3
- Stats at Pro Football Reference

Toby Lin Wright (born November 19, 1970) is an American former professional football player who was a safety in the National Football League (NFL) for the Los Angeles/St. Louis Rams and Washington Redskins. He played college football for the Nebraska Cornhuskers and was selected in the second round of the 1994 NFL draft. He attended Dobson High School in Mesa, Arizona.

Pre-draft measurables
Height	Weight	Arm length	Hand span	40-yard dash	10-yard split	20-yard split	20-yard shuttle	Vertical jump
5 ft 11 in (1.80 m)	203 lb (92 kg)	30 3/4 in (0.78 m)	9 1/2 in (0.24 m)	4.66 s	1.65 s	2.73 s	4.07 s	33.5 in (0.85 m)
All values from NFL Combine

== Personal life ==
His brother Terry Wright also played in the NFL.

Wright's son, Javin, plays in the NFL for the Tampa Bay Buccaneers.
