= Nick Reid =

American football player (born 1983)

No. 57
- Position: Linebacker

Personal information
- Born: November 18, 1983 (age 42); Wichita, Kansas, U.S.
- Listed height: 6 ft 4 in (1.93 m)
- Listed weight: 230 lb (104 kg)

Career information
- High school: Derby (Derby, Kansas)
- College: Kansas
- NFL draft: 2006: undrafted

Career history
- Kansas City Chiefs (2006–2007)*; Frankfurt Galaxy (2007)
- * Offseason or practice squad member only

Awards and highlights
- Third-team All-American (2005); Big 12 Defensive Player of the Year (2005); 2× First-team All-Big 12 (2004, 2005)

Nicholas Gregory Reid (born November 18, 1983) is an American former football player. He played college football for the Kansas Jayhawks. He signed a free agent contract with the Kansas City Chiefs of the National Football League (NFL) on May 2, 2006. In February 2007, Reid was re-signed by the Chiefs to a two-year contract. Later that month Reid was assigned by the Chiefs to the Frankfurt Galaxy of NFL Europa.

== Early life ==
Reid was born on November 18, 1983, in Wichita, Kansas. He attended Derby High School. In high school, Reid started at quarterback and defensive back for the Panthers. He was ranked as the top quarterback prospect in Kansas by MoKan Football.com and Scout.com. He was also named to the Coaches Association, Wichita Eagle, Topeka Capital-Journal, and Kansas City Star Class 6A 1st Team All-state team following his senior year. Reid set a school record for career total offense with 4,171 yards. He was credited with 16 career touchdown passes. He also rushed for 13 touchdowns. A three-year starter at quarterback, he averaged 10.4 yards per carry and 21.6 yards per passing attempt as a senior. Following his senior season, Reid was selected to play in the Shrine Bowl All-Star game. He helped his team to an 8–1 record and district runner-up finish in 2001. He missed three games due to a sprained knee. He was a 1st Team All-league selection and honorable mention all-state choice as a junior. Reid rushed for 637 yards and passed for 1,111 yards as a junior. He started on the varsity as a sophomore and helped Derby to a No. 1 ranking in the state and a 9–1 season record. Reid helped guide Derby to a combined 25–3 record his three seasons as a starter. He was coached in football by Tom Young. Additionally, he was named the Derby High School 2002 Male Athlete of the Year and was one of three finalists selected by the media for the Greater Wichita Sports Commission Barry Sanders High School Male Athlete of the Year. Also, he was a four-year starter and All-League performer in basketball and the Panthers leading scorer and rebounder. Reid was an all-league and state performer in track while competing in high hurdles and with high jumps reaching 6'7".

== Collegiate career ==
He attended the University of Kansas and was a highly decorated linebacker for the Kansas Jayhawks playing in 48 games (40 starts) for the Jayhawks. As a freshman, he received Big 12 All-Freshman Team honors by Sporting News. As a sophomore in 2003, he recorded a team-best 133 tackles (93 solo) & was named Honorable Mention All-Big 12. As a junior in 2004, he led the team in tackles and earned First-team All-Big 12 honors. Reid finished his college career with 416 tackles (254 solo), 41.0 tackles for loss (-154.0 yards), 14.0 sacks (-85.0 yards), three interceptions, fourteen passes defensed, six forced fumbles and one fumble recovery. His 416 career tackles put him second in school records behind LB Willie Pless. He was named Big 12 Defensive Player of the Year, was a member of the First-team All-Big 12 selection as well as a Third-team College Football All-American selection as a senior in 2005.

== Professional career ==
Reid played for the Frankfurt Galaxy of NFL Europa. Reid was named NFL Europa's defensive player of the week May 30, after turning in a phenomenal performance for the Galaxy in their 23–10 victory over the Rhein Fire. Reid was allocated by the Kansas City Chiefs to Frankfurt, after he signed a two-year contract in February. Reid played linebacker and special teams for the Galaxy and had a total of 55 tackles (52 solo), three sacks, one interception, one forced fumble, three passes defensed, and six special teams stops during the 2006 season. Reid was cut by the Chiefs at the end of training camp as one of the Chiefs' final roster moves for the 2007 season.

== Personal life ==
Reid is the defensive coordinator at Joplin High School in Joplin, Missouri, and also the head track coach.
