= Jason Gamble =

American football player (born 1975)

No. 73
- Position: Offensive guard

Personal information
- Born: September 12, 1975 (age 51); Columbus, Ohio, U.S.
- Listed height: 6 ft 3 in (1.91 m)
- Listed weight: 295 lb (134 kg)

Career information
- High school: Derby (KS)
- College: Clemson
- NFL draft: 1999: undrafted

Career history
- Tennessee Titans (1999)*; Jacksonville Jaguars (2000)*; → Scottish Claymores (2000); Orlando Rage (2001); Dallas Cowboys (2001)*; Grand Rapids Rampage (2003–2005); Georgia Force (2006)
- * Offseason or practice squad member only
- Stats at ArenaFan.com

Jason Edward Gamble (born September 12, 1975) is a former Arena Football League offensive lineman/defensive lineman for the Grand Rapids Rampage (2003–2005) and Georgia Force (2006).

== Early life ==
Gamble attended Derby High School in Derby, Kansas, and was a letterwinner in football and wrestling.

== College career ==
Gamble attended Hutchinson Community College in Hutchinson, Kansas for two years. As a sophomore, he was a Junior College All-American and the Jayhawk Conference Offensive Lineman of the Year.

Gamble attended Clemson University and was a two-year starter at center on the football team. As a senior, he won All-ACC honorable mention honors. After his senior year, he was selected to participate in the Senior Bowl and the East-West Shrine Game.
