= Derrick Clark (American football) =

American football player (1971–2026)

No. 43
- Positions: Running back, fullback

Personal information
- Born: May 4, 1971; Apopka, Florida, U.S.
- Died: February 19, 2026 (aged 54)
- Listed height: 6 ft 1 in (1.85 m)
- Listed weight: 235 lb (107 kg)

Career information
- High school: Apopka
- College: Evangel
- NFL draft: 1994: undrafted

Career history
- Denver Broncos (1994); Rhein Fire (1996); Denver Broncos (1996)*; Oakland Raiders (1997)*; Rhein Fire (1997–1999); Orlando Rage (2001)
- * Offseason or practice squad member only

Awards and highlights
- All-NFL Europe (1998); World Bowl champion (VI)

Career NFL statistics
- Rushing yards: 168
- Rushing average: 3
- Rushing touchdowns: 3
- Receptions: 9
- Receiving yards: 47
- Stats at Pro Football Reference

Derrick Lee Clark (May 4, 1971 – February 19, 2026) was an American professional football player who was a running back for the Denver Broncos of the National Football League (NFL). He played college football for the Evangel Valor. He also played professionally for the Rhein Fire of NFL Europe and Orlando Rage of the XFL.

Clark was the owner and head coach of the Daytona Beach Broncos.

== Professional career ==
=== 1994 ===
Clark was signed by the Denver Broncos of the National Football League as an undrafted free agent on May 4, 1994. He played in all 16 regular season games, starting four at fullback. Clark rushed for 168 yards on 56 carries and scored three touchdowns. He also had nine receptions for 47 yards.

=== 1996 ===
The Denver Broncos re-signed Clark in February 1996 and allocated him to the World League of American Football, where he played for the Rhein Fire. He was the teams' leading rusher with 84 runs for 399 yards and three touchdowns. He also had 37 receptions for 229 yards. Following the WLAF season Clark returned to Denver, but was released during the preseason on August 18.

== Death ==
Clark died on February 15, 2026, at the age of 54.
