= Blake Spence =

American football player (born 1975)

No. 82, 84
- Position: Tight end

Personal information
- Born: June 20, 1975 (age 51); Corpus Christi, Texas, U.S.
- Listed height: 6 ft 4 in (1.93 m)
- Listed weight: 249 lb (113 kg)

Career information
- High school: Capistrano Valley (Mission Viejo, California)
- College: Oregon
- NFL draft: 1998: 5th round, 146th overall pick

Career history
- New York Jets (1998–1999); Tampa Bay Buccaneers (2000)

Awards and highlights
- Second-team All-Pac-10 (1997)

Career NFL statistics
- Receptions: 4
- Receiving yards: 20
- Touchdowns: 1
- Stats at Pro Football Reference

Blake Andrew Spence (born June 20, 1975) is an American former professional football player who was a tight end in the National Football League (NFL) for the New York Jets and Tampa Bay Buccaneers. He played college football for the Oregon Ducks. He was selected in the fifth round of the 1998 NFL draft.

Spence had a blocked punt in the 1999 AFC Championship Game.
