= Scott Adams (American football) =

American football player (1966–2013)

No. 72, 64, 71
- Positions: Guard, tackle

Personal information
- Born: September 28, 1966; Lake City, Florida, U.S.
- Died: September 16, 2013 (aged 46); Oconee County, Georgia, U.S.
- Listed height: 6 ft 5 in (1.96 m)
- Listed weight: 290 lb (132 kg)

Career information
- High school: Columbia (Lake City, Florida)
- College: Georgia
- NFL draft: 1989: undrafted

Career history
- Dallas Cowboys (1989)*; Atlanta Falcons (1990)*; Barcelona Dragons (1991); Minnesota Vikings (1991–1993); New Orleans Saints (1994); Chicago Bears (1995); Tampa Bay Buccaneers (1996); Denver Broncos (1997)*; Atlanta Falcons (1997); Denver Broncos (1999)*; San Francisco Demons (2001)
- * Offseason or practice squad member only

Career NFL statistics
- Games played: 58
- Games started: 11
- Fumble recoveries: 1
- Stats at Pro Football Reference

Scott Alexander Adams (September 28, 1966 – September 16, 2013) was an American professional football player who played guard for a six-season career, in-which he played for the Minnesota Vikings, New Orleans Saints, Chicago Bears, Tampa Bay Buccaneers, and Atlanta Falcons.

Adams was born on September 28, 1966, in Lake City, Florida.

After playing in the NFL, Adams began a career in mortgage banking in Athens, Georgia. Adams died of a heart attack on September 16, 2013, aged 46, in Oconee County, Georgia.
