= Dan Collins (American football) =

American football player (born 1976)

Profile
- Position: Guard

Personal information
- Born: July 27, 1976 (age 50); Raynham, Massachusetts
- Listed height: 6 ft 4 in (1.93 m)
- Listed weight: 250 lb (113 kg)

Career information
- College: Boston College
- NFL draft: 1999: undrafted

Career history
- New England Patriots (1999)*; Rhein Fire (2000); Seattle Seahawks (2000)*; Orlando Rage (2001); Dallas Cowboys (2002)
- * Offseason or practice squad member only

Dan Collins (born July 27, 1976) is an American former football guard in the National Football League who played for the Dallas Cowboys. He also played for the NFL-Europe team Rhein Fire and the XFL team the Orlando Rage.
