= Dwayne Harper =

American football player (born 1966)

No. 29, 28, 40, 24
- Position: Cornerback

Personal information
- Born: March 29, 1966 (age 60); Orangeburg, South Carolina, U.S.
- Listed height: 5 ft 11 in (1.80 m)
- Listed weight: 175 lb (79 kg)

Career information
- High school: Orangeburg-Wilkinson (Orangeburg, South Carolina)
- College: South Carolina State
- NFL draft: 1988: 11th round, 299th overall pick

Career history
- Seattle Seahawks (1988–1993); San Diego Chargers (1994–1998); Detroit Lions (1999); San Francisco Demons (2001)

Career NFL statistics
- Tackles: 571
- Interceptions: 24
- Forced fumbles: 10
- Touchdowns: 1
- Stats at Pro Football Reference

Dwayne Anthony Harper (born March 29, 1966) is an American former professional football player who was a cornerback for 12 seasons in the National Football League (NFL). He played college football for the South Carolina State Bulldogs and was selected by the Seattle Seahawks in the 11th round of the 1988 NFL draft with the 299th overall pick. Harper started in Super Bowl XXIX for the San Diego Chargers.
