= Derby High School (Kansas) =

Location
- 920 North Rock Road; Derby, Kansas 67037; United States
- Coordinates: 37.553735°N 97.241816°W

Information
- School type: Public, High School
- Established: 1911
- School district: Derby USD 260
- CEEB code: 170765
- Principal: Gretchen Pontious
- Grades: 9–12
- Gender: coed
- Enrollment: 2,177 (2023-2024)
- Schedule: 9AM - 3:10PM Mon; 8 AM - 3:10PM Tue-Fri
- Hours in school day: 5 Blocks
- Campus type: Urban
- Colors: Green; White; Black
- Athletics: Class 6A; District 6
- Athletics conference: Ark Valley Chisholm Trail League
- Mascot: Panther
- Rival: Campus and Hutchinson
- Newspaper: The Panther's Tale
- Communities served: Derby
- Website: dhs.derbyschools.com

Derby High School is a public high school in Derby, Kansas, United States, operated by Derby USD 260 public school district, and serves students in grades 9-12. The school colors are green and white. It is the only public high school in the school district. The total enrollment for the 2023-24 school year is 2,177 students, making it the 3rd largest high school in the State of Kansas tailing only Wichita East and Wichita Southeast.

== History ==
Derby High School, formally Derby Senior High School, has been located in four different buildings since 1907. High school courses were first introduced in 1907, with the school's inaugural graduating class of just two students in 1911. The current Derby High School building, which is located East of Rock Road, North of Madison and South of James, was completed in the Fall of 1993 and is the largest high school building in Kansas in terms of square footage. The students moved to the new building after the 1993-94 Christmas break. The former high school building at Madison and Woodlawn is now Derby Middle School.

== Academics ==
Derby High School is a comprehensive high school offering a variety of courses designed to meet the needs of the students in Derby USD 260. The courses offered each year are based upon student demands, as determined by enrollment selections, facilities, and staff available.

== Extracurricular activities ==
=== Athletics ===
Derby High is a member of the Kansas State High School Activities Association and offers a variety of sports programs. Athletic teams compete in the 6A division, the largest division in the state of Kansas according to the KSHSAA, and are known as the "Panthers". More specifically, Derby is a Division 1 member of the Ark Valley Chisholm Trail League.

=== State championships ===
State Championships
| Season | Sport | Number of Championships | Year |
|---|---|---|---|
| Fall | Football | 7 | 1994, 2013, 2015, 2016, 2018, 2019, 2020 |
| Fall | Cross Country, Girls | 1 | 2008 |
| Winter | Wrestling | 7 | 1975, 1976, 1978, 1985, 1986, 2019, 2023 |
| Winter | Gymnastics, Girls | 4 | 1977, 1991, 1998, 1999 |
| Winter | Indoor Track & Field, Boys | 1 | 1974 |
| Winter | Basketball, Girls | 1 | 2018 |
| Winter | Bowling, Boys | 2 | 2017, 2024 |
| Spring | Baseball | 1 | 2001 |
| Spring | Golf, Boys | 1 | 1984 |
| Spring | Tennis, Boys | 1 | 1977 |
| Total | | 26 | |

Derby High School offers the following sports:

=== Fall ===
- Football
- Volleyball
- Cross-Country
- Girls Golf
- Boys Soccer
- Girls Tennis
- Cheerleading
- Dance Team (Pantherettes)

=== Winter ===
- Basketball
- Wrestling
- Boys Bowling
- Girls Bowling
- Boys Swimming/Diving

=== Spring ===
- Baseball
- Boys Golf
- Boys Tennis
- Girls Soccer
- Girls Swimming/Diving
- Softball
- Track and Field

== Notable alumni ==
- Carter Albrecht, former band member Edie Brickell & New Bohemians, Varenicline (Chantix) controversy
- Billy Campfield, former NFL player for the Philadelphia Eagles and the New York Giants
- Dylan Edwards, running back for the Kansas State Wildcats
- Sherrone Moore, former head coach of Michigan Wolverines football
- Nick Reid, former NFL player for the Kansas City Chiefs, 2× 1st Team All-Big 12 and Big 12 2005 Defensive MVP at Kansas
- David Rickels, professional Mixed Martial Artist for Bellator MMA
- Dave Sanders, former MLB player (Chicago White Sox)
