= Oaklawn-Sunview, Kansas =

Unincorporated community in Sedgwick County, Kansas

- Unincorporated community and CDP
- Location within Sedgwick County and Kansas

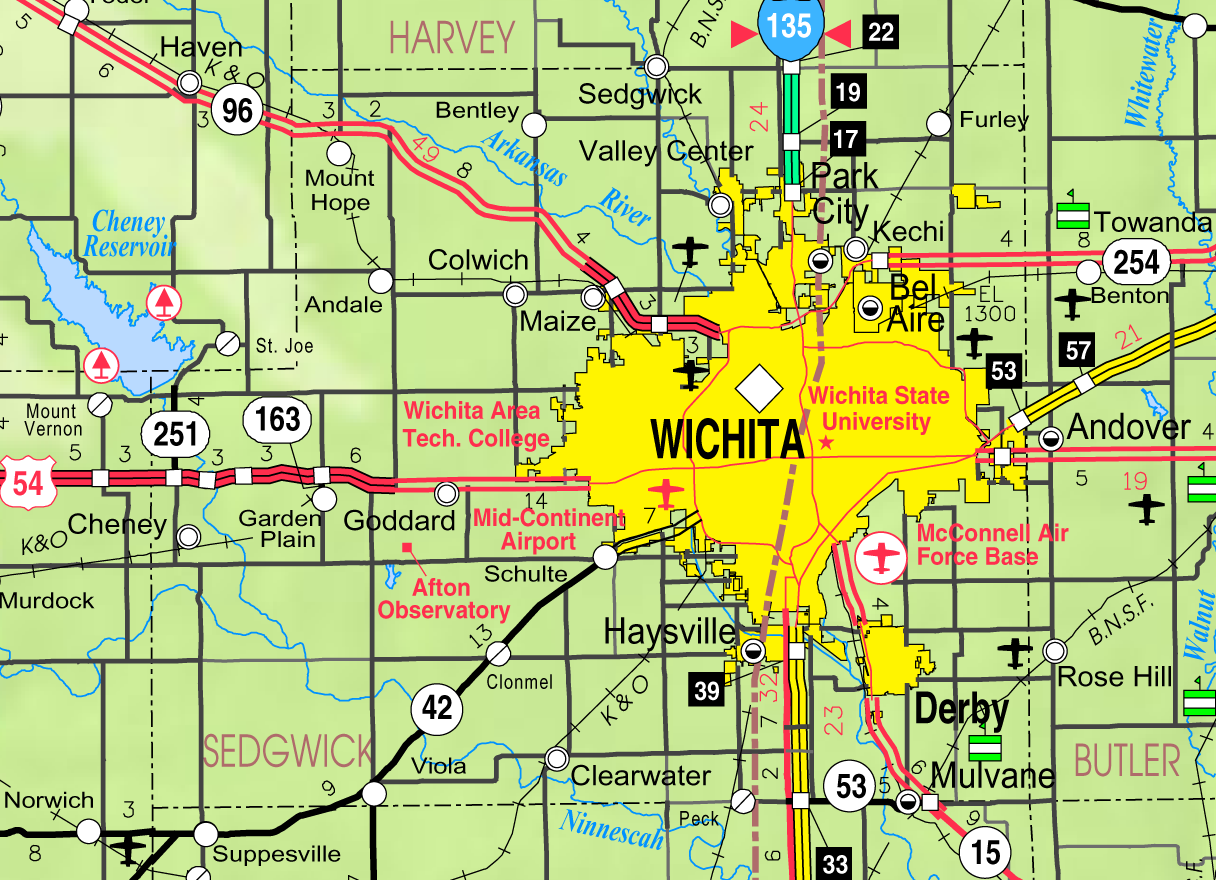
- KDOT map of Sedgwick County (legend)
- Coordinates: 37°36′37″N 97°17′49″W
- Country: United States
- State: Kansas
- County: Sedgwick
- Elevation: 1,270 ft (390 m)

Population (2020)
  - Total: 2,880
- Time zone: UTC-6 (CST)
  - Summer (DST): UTC-5 (CDT)
- ZIP Code: 67216
- Area code: 316
- FIPS code: 20-51800
- GNIS ID: 474355

Oaklawn-Sunview is an unincorporated community and census-designated place (CDP) in Sedgwick County, Kansas, United States. As of the 2020 census, the population was 2,880. It is located on the south side of Wichita along the west side of K-15 (Southeast Blvd) and 47th Street South intersection.

== Geography ==
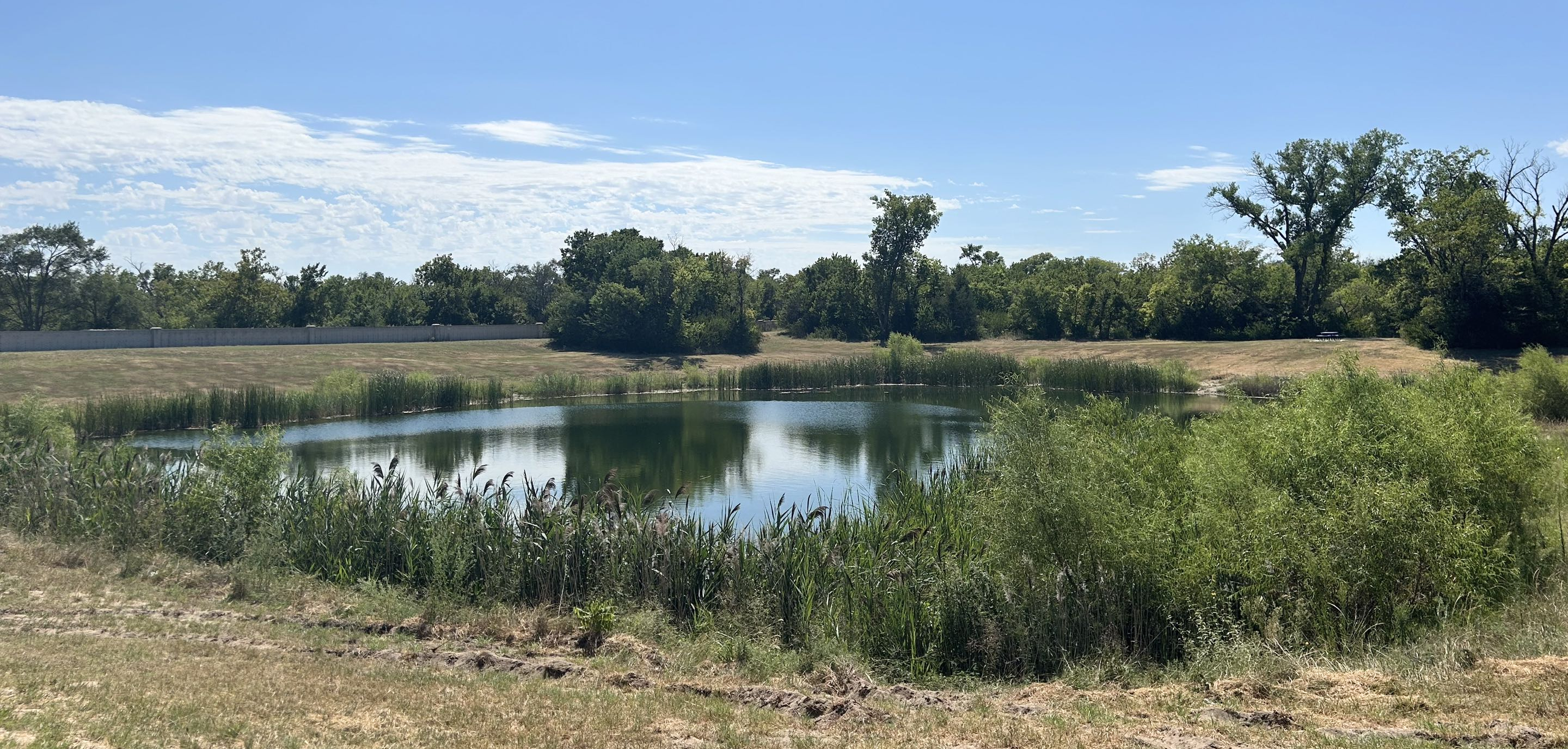
Trail Pond at Idlewild Park in 2026

Oaklawn-Sunview is located at 37°36′30″N 97°17′46″W (37.608463, -97.296045). According to the United States Census Bureau, the community has a total area of 0.5 square miles (1.3 km^{2}), all land.

== Demographics ==
Historical population
| Census | Pop. | Note | %± |
|---|---|---|---|
| 1990 | 3,240 | | — |
| 2000 | 3,135 | | −3.2% |
| 2010 | 3,276 | | 4.5% |
| 2020 | 2,880 | | −12.1% |
U.S. Decennial Census

=== 2020 census ===
As of the 2020 census, Oaklawn-Sunview had a population of 2,880, with 1,022 households and 636 families. The population density was 5,363.1 per square mile (2,070.7/km^{2}). There were 1,133 housing units at an average density of 2,109.9 per square mile (814.6/km^{2}), of which 9.8% were vacant. The homeowner vacancy rate was 0.4% and the rental vacancy rate was 8.8%.

The median age was 32.6 years. 30.5% of residents were under the age of 18, 9.1% were from 18 to 24, 27.8% were from 25 to 44, 21.4% were from 45 to 64, and 11.1% were 65 years of age or older. For every 100 females there were 103.8 males, and for every 100 females age 18 and over there were 98.4 males age 18 and over.

Of the 1,022 households, 36.7% had children under the age of 18 living in them. Of all households, 34.5% were married-couple households, 27.3% were households with a male householder and no spouse or partner present, and 28.3% were households with a female householder and no spouse or partner present. About 28.7% of households were made up of individuals, and 10.9% had someone living alone who was 65 years of age or older. The average household size was 2.6 and the average family size was 3.3.

100.0% of residents lived in urban areas, while 0.0% lived in rural areas.

Racial composition as of the 2020 census
| Race | Number | Percent |
|---|---|---|
| White | 1,483 | 51.5% |
| Black or African American | 117 | 4.1% |
| American Indian and Alaska Native | 95 | 3.3% |
| Asian | 412 | 14.3% |
| Native Hawaiian and Other Pacific Islander | 2 | 0.1% |
| Some other race | 387 | 13.4% |
| Two or more races | 384 | 13.3% |
| Hispanic or Latino (of any race) | 894 | 31.0% |

Non-Hispanic White residents were 43.09% of the population.

=== Demographic estimates ===
The 2016−2020 5-year American Community Survey estimates show that 5.1% of the population had a bachelor's degree or higher.

=== Income and poverty ===
The 2016−2020 5-year American Community Survey estimates show that the median household income was $32,273 (with a margin of error of +/- $10,779) and the median family income was $40,000 (+/- $4,920). Males had a median income of $26,195 (+/- $5,840) versus $23,611 (+/- $11,787) for females. The median income for those above 16 years old was $25,934 (+/- $6,104). Approximately, 11.5% of families and 21.8% of the population were below the poverty line, including 11.1% of those under the age of 18 and 43.2% of those ages 65 or over.

=== 2000 census ===
As of the census of 2000, there were 3,135 people, 1,056 households and 785 families residing in the CDP. The population density was 5,823.1 inhabitants per square mile (2,248.3/km^{2}). There were 1,179 housing units at an average density of 2,189.9 per square mile (845.5/km^{2}). The racial makeup of the CDP was 62.7% White, 8.9% African American, 2.4% Native American, 15.5% Asian, <0.1% Pacific Islander, 5.4% from other races, and 5.1% from two or more races. Hispanic or Latino of any race were 11.4% of the population.

There were 1,056 households out of which 44.1% had children under the age of 18 living with them, 49.1% were married couples living together, 17.0% had a female householder with no husband present, and 25.6% were non-families. 20.3% of all households were made up of individuals, and 4.9% had someone living alone who was 65 years of age or older. The average household size was 2.97 and the average family size was 3.47.

In the CDP the population was spread out with 35.1% under the age of 18, 10.9% from 18 to 24, 30.6% from 25 to 44, 16.7% from 45 to 64, and 6.7% who were 65 years of age or older. The median age was 27 years. For every 100 females, there were 102.5 males. For every 100 females age 18 and over, there were 100.2 males.

The median income for a household in the CDP was $34,292 and the median income for a family was $35,978. Males had a median income of $30,956 and females $20,172. The per capita income was $12,564. About 16.2% of families and 18.3% of the population were below the poverty line, including 20.8% of those under age 18 and 22.2% of those age 65 or over.

== Education ==
The community is served by Derby USD 260 public school district.
