= Eric England (gridiron football) =

American gridiron football player (born 1971)

Profile
- Position: Defensive end

Personal information
- Born: April 25, 1971 (age 55); Fort Wayne, Indiana, U.S.

Career information
- High school: Willowridge (Houston, Texas)
- College: Texas A&M
- NFL draft: 1994: 3rd round, 89th overall pick

Career history
- 1994–1996: Arizona Cardinals
- 1997: Tennessee Oilers
- 1999: Carolina Panthers*
- 2000: British Columbia Lions
- 2001: San Francisco Demons
- 2002: Detroit Fury
- 2003: New York Dragons
- 2003–2006: Toronto Argonauts
- * Offseason or practice squad member only

Awards and highlights
- Grey Cup champion (2004); CFL All-Star (2003); CFL East All-Star (2003); First-team All-SWC (1993)
- Stats at Pro Football Reference

Eric Jevon England (born April 25, 1971) is an American former professional football player who was a defensive end. He played in the National Football League (NFL), XFL, Arena Football League (AFL), and Canadian Football League (CFL).

== Early life ==
England attended Willowridge High School in Houston, Texas and won numerous All-American honors, and as a senior, made eleven sacks and 162 tackles.

== College career ==
The highlight of Eric's college career at Texas A&M was his selection to the All-Southwest Conference team as a junior.

== Professional career ==
England was selected in the third round of the 1994 NFL Draft by the Cardinals. England played three years (1994 to 1996) with the Arizona Cardinals of the NFL, suiting up for 37 games. He played 12 games with the BC Lions of the CFL in 2000, and in 2001 he played in 7 games with the San Francisco Demons of the XFL. In 2002, he played with the Detroit Fury of the Arena Football League. In 2003, he played with the New York Dragons of the AFL, then in the same season joined Toronto of the CFL. He played with the Toronto Argonauts between 2003 and 2006 (56 total games). During his stint as an Argo, England was named an all star in 2003 & a Grey Cup champion in 2004.

England was signed by the New York Sentinels of the UFL. He was later cut from the team.
