= Craig Powell (American football) =

American football player (born 1971)

No. 59, 56
- Position: Linebacker

Personal information
- Born: November 13, 1971 (age 54); Youngstown, Ohio, U.S.
- Listed height: 6 ft 4 in (1.93 m)
- Listed weight: 230 lb (104 kg)

Career information
- High school: Youngstown (OH) Rayen
- College: Ohio State
- NFL draft: 1995: 1st round, 30th overall pick

Career history
- Cleveland Browns (1995); Baltimore Ravens (1996); New York Jets (1998); San Francisco Demons (2001); BC Lions (2002–2003)

Career NFL statistics
- Tackles: 2
- Stats at Pro Football Reference

Craig Steven Powell (born November 13, 1971) is an American former professional football player who was a linebacker in the National Football League (NFL) from 1995 through 1998. He played college football at Ohio State University.

== NFL career ==
Powell was the Cleveland Browns' final first-round pick before the team moved to Baltimore. After leaving the NFL in 1998, Powell later moved to the XFL in 2001, playing one season for the San Francisco Demons after being selected 38th overall in the 2001 XFL draft.
