= Greg Williams (American football coach) =

American football player and coach (born 1976)

Los Angeles Rams
- Title: Inside linebackers coach

Personal information
- Born: March 12, 1976 (age 50)

Career information
- Position: Defensive back
- College: North Carolina

Career history

Playing
- San Francisco Demons (2001); Indiana Firebirds (2001–2003); Chicago Rush (2004–2005)

Coaching
- Arizona State (2003) Coaching intern; DuPage (2004–2005) Assistant coach; Arkansas Tech (2006–2007) Defensive backs coach & recruiting coordinator; Pittsburgh (2008) Graduate assistant; San Diego Chargers (2009–2012) Assistant linebackers coach; San Diego Chargers (2013–2015) Assistant secondary coach; Indianapolis Colts (2016–2017) Defensive backs coach; Denver Broncos (2018) Defensive backs coach; Arizona Cardinals (2019–2022) Cornerbacks coach; Green Bay Packers (2023) Passing game coordinator; Los Angeles Rams (2024–present) Inside linebackers coach

Greg Williams (born March 12, 1976) is an American football coach who is the inside linebackers coach for the Los Angeles Rams of the National Football League (NFL). He previously served as an assistant coach for the Denver Broncos, Indianapolis Colts, San Diego Chargers, Arizona Cardinals, and Green Bay Packers.

Williams has 15 seasons of coaching experience, including nine years at the NFL level.

== Playing career ==
Williams is a former Illinois high school football player of the state. Winning the award over NFL QB Donovan McNabb. Williams is a former wide receiver and safety who played at the University of North Carolina. He competed in training camps with the Chicago Bears and New York Giants before spending time in NFL Europe, the XFL and the Arena Football League. Williams played defensive back for the Indiana Firebirds in the Arena Football League from (2001–2003), as well as the Chicago Rush from (2004–2005).

== Coaching career ==
=== College ===
Williams' coaching career began as an intern with Arizona State University in 2003 and as an assistant coach at the College of DuPage from 2004 to 2005. Williams spent two years (2006–2007) as Arkansas Tech University's defensive backs coach and recruiting coordinator before working the 2008 season as the University of Pittsburgh's secondary coach and graduate assistant.

=== NFL ===
==== San Diego Chargers ====
In 2009, Williams was hired by the San Diego Chargers as their assistant linebackers coach. He held that position for four seasons before becoming the team's assistant secondary coach from 2013 to 2015.

==== Indianapolis Colts ====
In 2016, Williams was hired by the Indianapolis Colts as their defensive backs coach under head coach Chuck Pagano.

==== Denver Broncos ====
In 2018, Williams was hired by the Denver Broncos as their defensive backs coach under head coach Vance Joseph.

==== Arizona Cardinals ====
On February 6, 2019, Williams was hired by the Arizona Cardinals as their cornerbacks coach under defensive coordinator Vance Joseph and head coach Kliff Kingsbury.

==== Green Bay Packers ====
On March 10, 2023, Williams was hired by the Green Bay Packers as their passing game coordinator.

==== Los Angeles Rams ====
Williams joined the Los Angeles Rams to serve as inside linebackers coach under head coach Sean McVay.
