= Carl Hansen (American football) =

American football player (born 1976)

No. 75
- Position: Defensive end

Personal information
- Born: January 25, 1976 (age 50); Houston, Texas, U.S.
- Listed height: 6 ft 5 in (1.96 m)
- Listed weight: 280 lb (127 kg)

Career information
- High school: Stratford (Houston)
- College: Stanford
- NFL draft: 1998: 6th round, 162nd overall pick

Career history
- Seattle Seahawks (1998)*; New York Jets (1998); Green Bay Packers (1999)*; New York Giants (2000)*; San Francisco Demons (2001)
- * Offseason or practice squad member only

Career NFL statistics
- Tackles: 1
- Stats at Pro Football Reference

Carl Hansen (born January 25, 1976) is an American former professional football player who was a defensive end in the National Football League (NFL) for the New York Jets. He played college football for the Stanford Cardinal and was selected by the Seattle Seahawks in the sixth round of the 1998 NFL draft. On June 6 Hansen was signed by the Seahawks only to be dropped and placed on the practice squad prior to the start of the 1998 season. The New York Jets then signed Hansen to their active roster and he played in five games his rookie season. In 2001 Hansen played for the San Francisco Demons of the XFL.
