= Sean Manuel =

American football player (born 1973)

No. 86
- Position: Tight end

Personal information
- Born: December 1, 1973 (age 52); Los Gatos, California, U.S.
- Listed height: 6 ft 2 in (1.88 m)
- Listed weight: 245 lb (111 kg)

Career information
- High school: Pinole (CA) Valley
- College: New Mexico State
- NFL draft: 1996: 7th round, 239th overall pick

Career history
- San Francisco 49ers (1996); England Monarchs (1998); Kansas City Chiefs (1998); San Francisco Demons (2001)
- Stats at Pro Football Reference

Sean Manuel (born December 1, 1973) is an American former professional football tight end. He played in the National Football League (NFL) for the San Francisco 49ers in 1996 and in the XFL for the San Francisco Demons in 2001.
