= Orlando Rage =

Defunct American football team

Logo

General information
- Founded: 2001
- Folded: 2001; 25 years ago
- Stadium: Citrus Bowl
- Headquartered: Orlando, Florida
- Colors: Red, navy blue, gold, white

Personnel
- General manager: Tom Veit
- Head coach: Galen Hall

League / conference affiliations
- XFL; Eastern Division

Championships
- Division championships: 0; 1 (2001)

The Orlando Rage was an American football team based in Orlando, Florida as part of the XFL, begun by Vince McMahon of the World Wrestling Federation and by NBC, a major television network in the United States.

== History ==
The team's colors were scarlet, yellow, navy blue and white with jersey numbers in a unique jagged font. They played their home games at Orlando's Florida Citrus Bowl, which was configured so that the upper deck was closed off and all fans were seated in the lower bowl to give a better appearance for television (a move that was effective, as the Rage had one of the stronger fan bases in the league, with average attendance at over two-thirds of the lower bowl's capacity; the team sold out all 36,000 lower bowl seats for its home opener). The team's General Manager was Tom Veit a former Major League Soccer Vice-president and were coached by former Florida Gators head coach Galen Hall. They were in the XFL's Eastern Division with the NY/NJ Hitmen, Chicago Enforcers and Birmingham Thunderbolts.

The Rage were one of the two teams who opted not to don nicknames on the back of their jerseys. In the Rage's case, the decision was made by a majority vote of the players (despite the objections of starting quarterback Jeff Brohm, who openly embraced the XFL's approach to sports entertainment and wanted to wear "J Bro" on his jersey).

Jeff Brohm, at the time also under contract to the Cleveland Browns, was the quarterback of the Rage for most of the regular season, amassing a 6–0 record as starter during his first time at the helm. The team looked to be the league's powerhouse franchise under Brohm and was on pace for a perfect season (coincidentally, Orlando's next professional football team, the Florida Tuskers, would also win their first six games in a row before losing the seventh). He showed his toughness after he suffered an injury from a devastating hit by at the hands of Memphis Maniax defensive end Shante Carver in Week 5. Despite suffering a concussion in the hit and doctors' advice not to play, Brohm came back a week later against Las Vegas, giving a rousing speech stating that he was returning because it was the XFL and he still had a pulse. The following week he suffered a shoulder injury against the Los Angeles Xtreme and his season (and playing career) was done for good. It led to him being replaced by Brian Kuklick after six games. While Kuklick filled in the role of quarterback acceptably, the team lost a valuable leader on offense. The team went 2–2 in Kuklick's care; Kuklick, despite only starting four games, led the league in interceptions with 10.

The team finished their only regular season with an 8–2 record, the best in the league, but were upset in the first round of the playoffs by the 5–5 San Francisco Demons. Orlando had an early 16–0 advantage but allowed San Francisco to pull ahead and take a 26–16 lead by the fourth quarter. Using the XFL's newly introduced three-point conversion rule on a subsequent touchdown, the Rage got within one point but the Demons successfully ran out the clock and won 26–25. San Francisco would go on to lose the XFL Championship Game versus Los Angeles 38–6. Many in the league were disappointed, hoping for a match-up against the two division champions. NBC dropped the XFL after the first season (2001) due to dismal ratings, and the league folded soon afterward.

=== XFL returns to Florida ===
In December 2018, the revival of the XFL announced that it would return to Florida. Because the Alliance of American Football's Orlando Apollos already laid claim to the Orlando market, the XFL opted to place the new team in Tampa, Florida, 80 miles (130 km) southwest of Orlando and connected to that city by way of Interstate 4. The league was exploring relocating the Vipers to Orlando shortly before the league suspended operations and went bankrupt in April 2020. In 2022, the league, under new ownership, announced that the New York Guardians would relocate to Orlando as the Orlando Guardians. The team took the field on February 18, 2023. Following the XFL merger with the USFL that was the last season in Orlando

=== Season-by-season ===
Season records
Season	W	L	T	Finish	Playoff results
2001	8	2	0	1st Eastern	Lost Semifinals (San Francisco)
Totals	8	3	0	(including playoffs)	

=== Schedule ===
==== Regular season ====
Week	Date	Opponent	Result	Record	Venue	Attendance
1	February 3	Chicago Enforcers	W 33–29	1–0	Florida Citrus Bowl	36,503
2	February 10	San Francisco Demons	W 26–14	2–0	Florida Citrus Bowl	25,049
3	February 18	at New York/New Jersey Hitmen	W 18–12	3–0	Giants Stadium	25,626
4	February 24	Birmingham Thunderbolts	W 30–6	4–0	Florida Citrus Bowl	21,947
5	March 4	at Memphis Maniax	W 21–19	5–0	Liberty Bowl Memorial Stadium	16,176
6	March 10	Las Vegas Outlaws	W 27–15	6–0	Florida Citrus Bowl	24,677
7	March 18	at Los Angeles Xtreme	L 6–31	6–1	Los Angeles Memorial Coliseum	20,382
8	March 25	New York/New Jersey Hitmen	W 17–12	7–1	Florida Citrus Bowl	19,641
9	March 31	at Birmingham Thunderbolts	W 29–24	8–1	Legion Field	10,163
10	April 8	at Chicago Enforcers	L 6–23	8–2	Soldier Field	17,195

==== Post-season ====
Round	Date	Opponent	Result	Record	Venue	Attendance
Semi-final	April 14	San Francisco Demons	L 25–26	0–1	Florida Citrus Bowl	14,849

== Personnel ==
=== Staff ===
2001 Orlando Rage staff
Front office: Vice president/general manager – Tom Veit; Director of player personnel – Will McClay; Head coaches: Head coach/director of football operations – Galen Hall; Offensive coaches: Offensive coordinator/quarterbacks – Mike Kelly; Wide receivers – Mike Jones; Tight ends – Les Moss; Offensive line – Whitey Jordan; Quality control/offense – Matt Moore	Defensive coaches: Defensive coordinator/linebackers – Charlie Bailey; Defensive line – Mickey Mays; Secondary – Steve Carson; Quality control/defense – Tom Silvanic; Special teams coaches: Special teams – Andy Cox

=== Roster ===
2001 Orlando Rage roster
Quarterbacks (QB): 14 Brian Kuklick; Running backs (RB): 21 Michael Black; 43 Derrick Clark; 20 Brian Shay; Wide receivers (WR): 5 Mario Bailey; 81 Dialleo Burks; 88 Scott Cloman; 2 Shannon Culver; 1 Tony Gaiter; 4 Kevin Swayne; Tight ends (TE): 85 Lawrence Hart	Offensive linemen (OL): 65 Jeremy Akers T; 66 Dan Collins T; 57 Cal Dixon C; 73 Jason Gamble G; 68 Dan Goodspeed T; 69 Sean Love G; 60 Garin Patrick C; Defensive linemen (DL): 97 Mark Campbell DT; 91 Sedric Clark DE; 95 Bill Duff DT; 72 Ben Huff DT; 99 Andre Purvis DT; 90 James Roberson DE	Linebackers (LB): 58 Patrise Alexander; 56 Shawn Banks; 51 James Burgess; 54 Jimmy Clements; 46 Rich Young; Defensive backs (DB): 24 Ricky Bell; 22 Greg Haren S; 26 Reginald Doster CB; 35 Stephen Fisher CB; 41 Cory Gilliard S; 23 Kelly Malveaux CB; 33 Louis Riddick S; Special teams (ST): 10 Jay Taylor K	Practice squad: 16 Jim Arellanes QB; 76 Cheston Blackshear G; -- Patrick Bonner QB; 86 Terrance Huston TE; -- Corey Mayfield DT; -- Vincent Ruddy; -- Vince Marrow TE; 64 Jeff Miller T; 30 Hassan Shamsid-Deen DB; Reserve: 11 Jeff Brohm QB (IR); Rookies in italics, 8 practice squad

== Standings ==
Eastern Division
Team	W	L	T	PCT	PF	PA	STK
Orlando Rage	8	2	0	.800	207	162	L1
Chicago Enforcers	5	5	0	.500	163	178	W1
New York/New Jersey Hitmen	4	6	0	.400	110	145	W1
Birmingham Thunderbolts	2	8	0	.200	131	217	L7

== Statistical leaders ==
Legend
Led the league

=== Passing ===
Passing statistics
NAME	GP	GS	Record	Cmp	Att	Pct	Yds	TD	Int	Rtg
Brian Kuklick	5	3	2–1	68	122	55.7	994	6	10	64.7
Jeff Brohm	7	7	6–1	69	119	58.8	993	9	3	99.9
Totals	10	10	8–2	137	241	56.8	1,987	15	13	82.1

=== Rushing ===
Rushing statistics
NAME	Att	Yds	Avg	Lng	TD
Derrick Clark	94	395	4.2	19	7
Michael Black	83	320	3.9	20	0
Brian Shay	36	198	5.5	28t	2
Brian Kuklick	17	31	1.8	9	1
Jeff Brohm	16	67	4.2	33t	1
Mario Bailey	2	15	7.5	11	0
Totals	248	1,026	4.1	33	11

=== Receiving ===
Receiving statistics
NAME	Rec	Yds	Avg	Lng	TD
Dialleo Burks	34	659	19.4	81t	7
Kevin Swayne	27	400	14.8	51t	2
Mario Bailey	27	379	14.0	49t	3
Derrick Clark	12	109	9.1	38	0
Lawrence Hart	12	104	8.7	26	1
Shannon Culver	10	165	16.5	49t	1
Terrance Huston	5	51	10.2	29	0
Tony Gaiter	4	62	15.5	22	0
Mike Black	3	31	10.3	14	0
Brian Shay	3	27	9.0	12t	1
Totals	137	1,987	14.5	81	15

=== Scoring ===
12-30 (40.0)% on extra point conversion attempts

Total Scoring
NAME	Rush	Rec	Return	XPM	FGM	PTS
Derrick Clark	7	0	0	5	0	47
Dialleo Burks	0	7	0	2	0	44
Mario Bailey	0	3	1	2	0	26
Jay Taylor	0	0	0	0	7	21
Brian Shay	2	1	0	0	0	18
Kevin Swayne	0	2	0	1	0	13
Shannon Culver	0	1	0	1	0	7
Jeff Brohm	1	0	0	0	0	6
Omar Brown	0	0	1	0	0	6
Sedric Clark	0	0	1	0	0	6
Bill Duff	0	0	1	0	0	6
Lawrence Hart	0	1	0	0	0	6
Brian Kuklick	1	0	0	0	0	6
Mike Black	0	0	0	1	0	1
Totals	11	15	4	12	7	213

== Awards and honors ==
=== Awards ===
Season	Coach	Award
2001	Galen Hall	Coach of the Year

=== Honors ===
Season	Player	Position	Honor
2001	Jeff Brohm	QB	All-XFL team
2001	James Burgess	LB	All-XFL team
2001	Jason Gamble	G	All-XFL team
