= Lawrence Hart (American football) =

American football player (born 1976)

No. 49
- Position: Tight end

Personal information
- Born: September 19, 1976 (age 50); New Orleans, Louisiana, U.S.
- Listed height: 6 ft 4 in (1.93 m)
- Listed weight: 271 lb (123 kg)

Career information
- High school: Woodlawn (Shreveport, Louisiana)
- College: Southern
- NFL draft: 1998: 7th round, 198th overall pick

Career history
- New York Jets (1998–1999)*; Green Bay Packers (1999–2000)*; Rhein Fire (2000); New Orleans Saints (2000)*; Dallas Cowboys (2000)*; Orlando Rage (2001); Jacksonville Jaguars (2001)*; Arizona Cardinals (2001)
- * Offseason or practice squad member only
- Stats at Pro Football Reference

Lawrence Edward Hart Jr. (born September 19, 1976) is an American former professional football tight end who played for the Arizona Cardinals of the National Football League (NFL). He played college football at Southern University.
