= San Francisco Demons =

American football team based in San Francisco, California

Logo

General information
- Founded: 2001
- Folded: 2001; 25 years ago
- Stadium: Pacific Bell Park
- Headquartered: San Francisco, California
- Colors: Red, black, yellow

Personnel
- Head coach: Jim Skipper

League / conference affiliations
- XFL; Western Division

The San Francisco Demons (originally named San Jose Demons) were a short-lived springtime American football team based in San Francisco, California. This team was part of the failed XFL begun by Vince McMahon of World Wrestling Entertainment and by NBC, a major television network in the United States. Originally they were to be based in San Jose but prior to the start of the season they were moved to San Francisco. They were in the Western Division with the Los Angeles Xtreme, Las Vegas Outlaws and Memphis Maniax.

The team played in Pacific Bell Park in San Francisco; despite having the smallest stadium in the league, they also had the highest average attendance (34,954). The fans had a cheering section nicknamed "The Hellhole".

The team was coached by Jim Skipper, former running backs coach for the New York Giants.

== History ==
In their only season of existence, the Demons went 5-5 to capture 2nd place in the regular season and qualified for post season play. In the first round, the Demons defeated the Orlando Rage, who had the best regular season record (8-2), by a score of 26-25. In the XFL's Million Dollar Game, which was the league championship game and last game in its history, the Demons were defeated by the Los Angeles Xtreme 38-6.

NBC dropped the XFL after the first season (2001) due to dismal ratings, and the league folded soon afterwards. The Demons played their home games in what was then Pacific Bell Park, now Oracle Park, the home of Major League Baseball's San Francisco Giants.

The most notable Demons players were Mike Pawlawski and Pat Barnes. Both played quarterback for the Demons in 2001. Pawlawski and Barnes both played for the California Golden Bears. Pawlawski was signed by the Demons after playing Arena Football for the Albany Firebirds. Barnes had been invited to training camp by the Oakland Raiders.

== Season ==
Season records
Season	W	L	T	Finish	Playoff results
2001	5	5	0	2nd Western	Won Semifinals (Orlando); Lost Million Dollar Game (Los Angeles)
Totals	6	6	0	(including playoffs)	

=== Schedule ===
==== Regular season ====
Week	Date	Opponent	Result	Record	Venue	Attendance
1	February 4	Los Angeles Xtreme	W 15–13	1–0	Pacific Bell Park	38,253
2	February 10	at Orlando Rage	L 14–26	1–1	Florida Citrus Bowl	25,049
3	February 17	at Memphis Maniax	W 13–6	2–1	Liberty Bowl Memorial Stadium	17,063
4	February 25	Las Vegas Outlaws	L 9–16	2–2	Pacific Bell Park	34,737
5	March 3	Birmingham Thunderbolts	W 39–10	3–2	Pacific Bell Park	33,403
6	March 11	New York/New Jersey Hitmen	L 12–20	3–3	Pacific Bell Park	33,522
7	March 18	at Chicago Enforcers	L 19–25	3–4	Soldier Field	11,428
8	March 24	Memphis Maniax	W 21–12	4–4	Pacific Bell Park	35,109
9	April 1	at Las Vegas Outlaws	W 14–9	5–4	Sam Boyd Stadium	17,656
10	April 7	at Los Angeles Xtreme	L 0–24	5–5	Los Angeles Memorial Coliseum	18,121

==== Post-season ====
Round	Date	Opponent	Result	Record	Venue	Attendance
Semi-final	April 14	at Orlando Rage	W 26–25	1–0	Florida Citrus Bowl	14,849
Championship	April 21	at Los Angeles Xtreme	L 6–38	1–1	Los Angeles Memorial Coliseum	24,153

== Personnel ==
=== Roster ===
2001 San Francisco Demons roster
Quarterbacks (QB): 18 Pat Barnes; 9 Mike Pawlawski; 3 Oteman Sampson; Running backs (RB): 4 Kelvin Anderson; 26 Juan Johnson; 41 Jamie Reader; Wide receivers (WR): 15 Jimmy Cunningham; 80 James Hundon; 81 Travis Moore; 89 Brian Roberson; 85 Tydus Winans; Tight ends (TE): 82 Sean Manuel	Offensive linemen (OL): 71 Scott Adams T; 70 Jeff Buckey T; 64 Seth Dittman T; 73 Pita Elisara T; 63 Mike Kiselak C; 79 Ben Nichols G; 77 Steve Scifres T; Defensive linemen (DL): 97 Albrey Battle DT; 99 Eric England DE; 75 Carl Hansen DE; 95 Jermaine Miles DE; 92 Abdul-Salam Noah DT	Linebackers (LB): 54 Otis Floyd; 52 Jon Haskins; 50 Sam Manuel; 56 Craig Powell; 55 James Williams; Defensive backs (DB): 17 Marvin Coleman; 20 Pete Destefano S; 21 Wendell Davis; 24 Dwayne Harper; 29 Terrance Joseph; 27 Kevin Kaesviharn S; 39 Terrell Sutton; 36 Greg Williams S; Special teams (ST): 10 Mike Panasuk K/P	Practice squad: 22 Terry Battle RB; 28 Lee Cole DB; 98 Jomo Cousins DE; 90 John DeWitt DE; 32 Toby Wright S; 23 Brandin Young RB; Reserve: 72 Josh Kobdish T; 88 Richard O'Donnell TE; 67 Curtice MacFarlane C; 93 Emile Palmer DT; 84 Brian Roche TE; Rookies in italics, 6 practice squad

=== Staff ===
2001 San Francisco Demons staff
Front office: Vice president/general manager – Mike Preacher; Director of player personnel – Greg Mohns; Head coaches: Head coach – Jim Skipper; Offensive coaches: Offensive coordinator – Joe Paopao; Running backs – Thomas Coleman; Offensive line – Ron De Monner; Offensive line – Kani Kauahi	Defensive coaches: Defensive coordinator – Michael Church; Defensive line – Keith Millard; Secondary – Jaime Hill; Special teams coaches: Special teams – Tom Everest

== Weekly starters ==
The following players were the weekly offensive and defensive game starters. (Note: San Francisco Demons Million Dollar Game Media Packet - Pages 73-74)

Opponent	LT	LG	C	RG	RT	TE	QB	FB	RB	WR	WR
Los Angeles	Dittman	Elisara	Kiselak	Scifres	Adams	Roche	Pawlawski	Reader	Dunbar	Roberson	Hundon
Orlando	Dittman	Hunt	Kiselak	Scifres	Adams	Roche	Pawlawski	Reader	Dunbar	Schexnayder	Hundon
Memphis	Dittman	Hunt	Kiselak	Scifres	Adams	O'Donnell	Pawlawski	Reader	Dunbar	Roberson	Hundon
Las Vegas	Dittman	Hunt	Kiselak	Scifres	Adams	O'Donnell	Pawlawski	Reader	Dunbar	Cunningham	Hundon
Birmingham	Dittman	Hunt	Kiselak	Scifres	Adams	Manuel	Barnes	Reader	Johnson	Roberson	Moore
NY/NJ	Dittman	Elisara	Kiselak	Scifres	Adams	Manuel	Barnes	Reader	Johnson	Roberson	Moore
Chicago	Dittman	Elisara	Kiselak	Scifres	Adams	Manuel	Pawlawski	Reader	Anderson	Roberson	Moore
Memphis	Dittman	Elisara	Kiselak	Scifres	Adams	Manuel	Pawlawski	Reader	Anderson	Roberson	Moore
Las Vegas	Dittman	Elisara	Kiselak	Scifres	Adams	Manuel	Pawlawski	Reader	Anderson	Roberson	Moore
Los Angeles	Dittman	Elisara	Kiselak	Scifres	Adams	Manuel	Pawlawski	Reader	Anderson	Roberson	Moore
Opponent	LDE	LDT	RDT	RDE	SLB	MLB	WLB	LCB	SS	FS	RCB
Los Angeles	Miles	Hansen	Cousins	England	J. Williams	Thomas	Haskins	Harper	Destefano	G. Williams	Davis
Orlando	Miles	Hansen	Cousins	England	J. Williams	Thomas	Haskins	Harper	Destefano	G. Williams	Davis
Memphis	Miles	Noah	Battle	England	J. Williams	Thomas	Haskins	Harper	Destefano	G. Williams	Kaesviharn
Las Vegas	England	Noah	Hansen	Miles	J. Williams	Thomas	Powell	Harper	Joseph	G. Williams	Kaesviharn
Birmingham	England	Noah	Hansen	Miles	J. Williams	Powell	Haskins	Harper	G. Williams	Joseph	Kaesviharn
NY/NJ	England	Noah	Palmer	Miles	J. Williams	Powell	Haskins	Harper	Destefano	G. Williams	Kaesviharn
Chicago	Cousins	Noah	Palmer	Hansen	J. Williams	Powell	Haskins	Harper	Destefano	G. Williams	Kaesviharn
Memphis	England	Noah	Hansen	Miles	J. Williams	Powell	Haskins	Davis	Wright	G. Williams	Kaesviharn
Las Vegas	England	Noah	Battle	Miles	J. Williams	Powell	Haskins	Harper	Wright	G. Williams	Kaesviharn
Los Angeles	England	Noah	Battle	Miles	J. Williams	Powell	Haskins	Harper	Wright	G. Williams	Kaesviharn
– started as third cornerback, – started as fullback, – started as fourth WR

== Standings ==
Western Division
Team	W	L	T	PCT	PF	PA	STK
Los Angeles Xtreme	7	3	0	.700	235	166	W1
San Francisco Demons	5	5	0	.500	156	161	L1
Memphis Maniax	5	5	0	.500	167	166	W2
Las Vegas Outlaws	4	6	0	.400	169	143	L3

== San Francisco Demons players ==
- 21 Wendell Davis CB college (Oklahoma) Davis played with the Dallas Cowboys for a little over three seasons. Davis played with Dallas for two full seasons (1996–97) before being sidelined for the 1998 season and part of 1999 season with the Cowboys.
- 18 Pat Barnes QB college (California) Barnes played two seasons in NFL Europe with the Frankfurt Galaxy. Barnes led the Galaxy to a World Bowl championship in 1999 and also saw a career highlight of 30 TD passes in his two years in NFL Europe. Barnes saw playing time in 1999 with the San Francisco 49ers. Barnes also pre-season action with the Kansas City Chiefs and later the Cleveland Browns after the XFL folded. Barnes was the Demons' second-string quarterback and saw spot duty through the season.
- 99 Eric England DE college (Texas A&M) England played three seasons in the NFL with the Arizona Cardinals (1994–1996) before embarking on a career in the CFL with the BC Lions in 1997–2000. In 2000 England was part of the Grey Cup champion BC Lions
- 84 Brian Roche TE college (Cal Poly/San Jose State) Roche played nearly four season in the NFL. Roche played two years in San Diego with the Chargers 1996–97 before joining the Kansas City Chiefs for a season (1998) and a part of another (1999)
- 26 Juan Johnson RB college (Utah) Johnson played in the CFL with the BC Lions in 1999 and in five games with the NFL Europe's Amsterdam Admirals in 2000 before joining the XFL
- 89 Brian Roberson WR college (Fresno State) Roberson played in the Indoor Football League in 2000 with the Fargo Freeze before joining the XFL
- Mike Pawlawski QB; Pawlawski, the longtime starting quarterback for the Arena Football League's Albany Firebirds, was the Demons' starting quarterback through the whole season. This would be Pawlawski's last time playing professional football; he retired from playing after the season and moved into broadcasting,
- 58 Kirk Sanderson DE ( Solano CC ) ( Bethune Cookman. Sanderson played in only 5 games before injury. Started in 3 games recording 7 sacks and 15 tackles. This would be the last team he played for. Sanderson is currently a sports performance coach working with NBA and NFL players.

== Team leaders ==
- Rushing yards: 228, Kelvin Anderson
- Receiving yards: 390, Jimmy Cunningham
- Passing yards: 1484, Mike Pawlawski
- Final team regular season stats available at all-XFL
