= Bennie Anderson =

American football player (born 1977)

No. 66, 63
- Position: Guard

Personal information
- Born: February 17, 1977 (age 49); St. Louis, Missouri, U.S.
- Listed height: 6 ft 5 in (1.96 m)
- Listed weight: 345 lb (156 kg)

Career information
- High school: Cleveland Junior Naval Academy (St. Louis, Missouri)
- College: Tennessee State (1996–1999)
- NFL draft: 2000: undrafted

Career history
- St. Louis Rams (2000)*; Chicago Enforcers (2001); Baltimore Ravens (2001–2004); Buffalo Bills (2005); Miami Dolphins (2006)
- * Offseason or practice squad member only

Career NFL statistics
- Games played: 81
- Games started: 72
- Stats at Pro Football Reference

Tyron Lamar "Bennie" Anderson (born February 17, 1977) is an American former professional football player who was a guard in the National Football League (NFL). He played college football for the Tennessee State Tigers.

== High school and college careers ==
Anderson attended Cleveland Junior Naval Academy in St. Louis, Missouri where he was an all-district performer.

He was a four-year letterman at Tennessee State (1996–99) where he started 43 of the 45 games in which he played during his career. He was a first-team All-Ohio Valley Conference pick as both a junior and senior, when he also earned the school's leadership award by the “Tree Coaches” (Tennessee State alumni coaches who sit under a tree watching practice).He was a first-team Black College All-America pick as a senior in 1999.

== Professional career ==
=== 2000 ===
Anderson was initially signed by the St. Louis Rams in 2000 as an undrafted rookie free agent. He was waived by the team on July 19 and spent rest of the year out of football.

=== 2001 ===
Anderson resurfaced with the Chicago Enforcers of the now defunct XFL in the spring of 2001. He started at right guard for the Enforcers the entire season, paving the way for former NFL running backs LeShon Johnson and John Avery (also a former first-round pick by the Miami Dolphins).

Later that year, Anderson would go on to play in all 16 regular season games with 13 starts at right guard for the Baltimore Ravens. After seeing action in a reserve role in the first two regular season games, he made the first start of his NFL career at the Denver Broncos on September 30 as the Ravens rushed for 112 yards and the line did not allow a sack in a 20–13 victory. Anderson also opened both playoff games.

=== 2002 ===
Anderson started all 16 games at right guard for the Ravens in 2002. He was one of only three Ravens offensive players to start all 16 games that year. He was part of a line that led the way for a running game that averaged 112.0 yards per contest and put together a 4.2-yard average per attempt as running back Jamal Lewis rushed for 1,327 yards and reached the 100-yard rushing mark in five games.

=== 2003 ===
Anderson opened all 15 regular season games in which he played at right guard for the Ravens in 2003. He dressed but did not play in the finale against the Pittsburgh Steelers. He was part of a line that paved the way for Jamal Lewis, who put together the second-best individual rushing performance in NFL history with 2,066 yards. Anderson also opened first-round playoff game against the Tennessee Titans on January 3, 2004.

=== 2004 ===
In his final season with the Ravens, Anderson played in all 16 contests, including 12 starts at right guard. He also saw action at left guard during the course of the season. He was an integral part of a line that led a running game which averaged 128.9 yards per contest and allowed 2.2 sacks an outing. Behind the line, running backs Jamal Lewis (4) and Chester Taylor (2) combined for six 100-yard rushing games.

=== 2005 ===
After the Ravens signed free agent offensive guard Keydrick Vincent from the Pittsburgh Steelers in early 2005, it became clear they had no interest in re-signing Anderson. He signed with the Buffalo Bills on March 19. The contract was a three-year deal worth $5.1 million. It also featured a $400,000 bonus if he met certain playing-time incentives.

Anderson started 15 of the 16 games in which he appeared at left guard for the Bills. The only game he did not open was against the Kansas City Chiefs on November 13, when he was replaced by Mike Williams after struggling with pass protection. Anderson re-assumed the role after Williams was injured on November 27. During the year, Anderson was part of a line that led the way for running back Willis McGahee, who compiled his second straight 1,000-yard rushing season with 1,247 yards.

=== 2006 ===
Anderson was expected to have the edge on the starting left guard position for the Bills in 2006, but was waived by the team on June 9. On June 15, he signed a to a two-year contract with the Miami Dolphins. The move reunited him with Mike Mularkey, who was the head coach for the Bills in 2004 and 2005 before becoming the offensive coordinator in Miami.

He initially assumed the starting right guard job after injuries to Seth McKinney and rookie Joe Toledo. Anderson started the first two games of the regular season at right guard before being injured on September 17 against his former team, the Buffalo Bills. The injury, which proved to be a torn triceps, landed Anderson on Injured Reserve. He was replaced by Kendyl Jacox and later L. J. Shelton at right guard.

== Personal life ==
Bennie is married with four sons: Bennie Jr, Joshua, Joseph, and Jeremiah. Bennie Jr. and Joshua are offensive linemen at Yale University and Eastern Michigan University respectively, and Joseph has committed to play defensive line at the University of Iowa.

Anderson earned a degree in history at Tennessee State, where he subsequently obtained his teaching certificate. He currently works as a history teacher at Westminster Christian Academy.
