= List of Northern Colorado Bears in the NFL draft =

This is a list of Northern Colorado Bears football players in the NFL draft.

== Key ==
B	Back	K	Kicker	NT	Nose tackle
C	Center	LB	Linebacker	FB	Fullback
DB	Defensive back	P	Punter	HB	Halfback
DE	Defensive end	QB	Quarterback	WR	Wide receiver
DT	Defensive tackle	RB	Running back	G	Guard
E	End	T	Offensive tackle	TE	Tight end

== Selections ==
Year	Round	Pick	Player	Team	Position
1938	10	87	Frank Barnhart	Green Bay Packers	G
1972	5	128	Greg Kucera	Cleveland Browns	RB
1973	10	235	Darrell Vaughn	Houston Oilers	DT
1977	7	191	Dave Stalls	Dallas Cowboys	DT
1978	12	333	Bill Kenney	Miami Dolphins	QB
1991	8	210	Frank Wainright	New Orleans Saints	TE
1997	6	168	Tony Ramirez	Detroit Lions	G
1999	4	109	Aaron Smith	Pittsburgh Steelers	DE
2005	2	61	Vincent Jackson	San Diego Chargers	WR
2006	6	173	Reed Doughty	Washington Redskins	DB
