= Casey Dailey =

American football player (born 1975)

No. 94, 56
- Position: Linebacker

Personal information
- Born: June 11, 1975 (age 51); Covina, California, U.S.
- Listed height: 6 ft 3 in (1.91 m)
- Listed weight: 249 lb (113 kg)

Career information
- High school: La Verne (CA) Damien
- College: Northwestern
- NFL draft: 1998: 5th round, 134th overall pick

Career history
- New York Jets (1998–1999); Chicago Enforcers (2001)

Awards and highlights
- First-team All-Big Ten (1997)

Career NFL statistics
- Tackles: 2
- Stats at Pro Football Reference

Casey J. Dailey (born June 11, 1975) is an American former professional football player who was a linebacker for three seasons with the New York Jets of the National Football League (NFL). He was selected by the Jets in the fifth round of the 1998 NFL draft. He played college football for the Northwestern Wildcats. Dailey was also a member of the Chicago Enforcers of the XFL.

== Early life ==
Dailey attended Damien High School in La Verne, California.

== College career ==
Dailey was a three-year starter at Northwestern University for the Wildcats. He recorded 26 tackles for a loss and 12 sacks his senior year in 1997. He was named the Wildcats defensive player of the year and earned first-team All-Big Ten honors as a senior. Dailey was also invited to East–West Shrine Game, Blue–Gray Football Classic and Hula Bowl in 1997. He accumulated 45 tackles and team high eight sacks his junior season. He returned a fumble 45 yards for a touchdown his sophomore year.

== Professional career ==
Dailey was selected by the New York Jets of the NFL in the fifth round with the 134th pick in the 1998 NFL draft. He signed with the Jets on July 8, 1998. Dailey was released by the Jets on September 5 and was re–signed to the team's practice squad on September 6. Dailey was activated from the practice squad on October 5. He played in six games for the Jets during the 1999 season. Dailey was released by New York on August 20, 2000.

Dailey was a territorial selection of the Chicago Enforcers of the XFL in the XFL draft and played for them in 2001.
