= Failla =

Failla is a surname. Notable bearers include:

- James "Jimmy Brown" Failla (1919–1999), senior caporegime with the Gambino crime family
- Jimmy Failla (born 1976) American stand-up comedian and talk show host
- Paul J. Failla (born 1972), former American football and baseball player and coach
- Polk Failla (born 1969), United States District Judge of the United States District Court for the Southern District of New York
- Clayton Failla (born 1986), Maltese professional footballer
- Gioacchino Failla (1891–1961), Italian-born American physicist
