= Aaron Bailey (American football) =

American football player (born 1971)

No. 80, 83, 7, 14
- Position: Wide receiver

Personal information
- Born: October 24, 1971 (age 55); Ann Arbor, Michigan, U.S.
- Listed height: 5 ft 10 in (1.78 m)
- Listed weight: 185 lb (84 kg)

Career information
- High school: Pioneer (Ann Arbor, Michigan)
- College: DuPage (1990–1991); Louisville (1992–1993)
- NFL draft: 1994: undrafted

Career history
- Indianapolis Colts (1994–1998); Oakland Raiders (1999)*; New England Patriots (2000)*; Chicago Enforcers (2001); Carolina Cobras (2001–2002); San Jose SaberCats (2003); New Orleans VooDoo (2004–2005); Grand Rapids Rampage (2006)
- * Offseason or practice squad member only

Awards and highlights
- NJCAA First-Team All-America (1991); NJCAA Region IV Player of the Year (1991)

Career NFL statistics
- Receptions: 67
- Receiving yards: 1,040
- Receiving touchdowns: 6
- Kickoff return yards: 3,501
- Kickoff return touchdowns: 2
- Punt return yards: 195
- Stats at Pro Football Reference

Career AFL statistics
- Receptions: 433
- Receiving yards: 5,618
- Receiving touchdowns: 113
- Kick return yards: 1,384
- Kick return touchdowns: 4
- Stats at ArenaFan.com

Aaron Duane Bailey (born October 24, 1971) is an American former professional football player who was a wide receiver and return specialist for five seasons with the Indianapolis Colts in the National Football League (NFL). Bailey later played for one season in the XFL (2001) and six seasons in the Arena Football League (2001–2006). He played college football at Louisville.

== Early life ==
Aaron Bailey was born on October 24, 1971, in Ann Arbor, Michigan. He attended Ann Arbor Pioneer High School where he was a star football player as a running back and a track and field athlete.

As a senior in track, Bailey won the Michigan Class A long jump state title with a jump of 23' 5 1/2".

In football, Bailey led Pioneer to a Michigan Class A state title as a junior with 1,100 rushing yards on the season. As a senior, Bailey earned Michigan All-State honors with 147 carries for 1,060 rushing yards and 19 receptions for 306 yards with 24 total touchdowns. In 1989, Bailey was named to the Detroit Free Press 1980s Michigan football Class A All-Decade team.

Bailey committed to play football at Eastern Michigan.

== College career ==
Bailey enrolled at Eastern Michigan for the 1989–1990 academic year, but was forced to sit out of football for one season due to the NCAA's Proposition 48 eligibility rule requiring that student-athletes maintain a specific grade point average or standardized test score while in high school.

=== College of DuPage (1990–1991) ===
After attending Eastern Michigan for a year, Bailey began his college football career at College of DuPage, a junior college in Glen Ellyn, Illinois. As a freshman, Bailey played the 1990 season as a defensive back, not having played defense in high school. He led DuPage with five interceptions and three fumble recoveries, earning All-N4C Conference honors.

As a sophomore at DuPage, Bailey began the season as a safety and kick returner before he was moved to running back. He quickly became one of the top junior college performers in the country. In a September 21, 1991, game against Harper College Bailey returned the opening kickoff for a 95-yard touchdown and followed up with an 85-yard punt return touchdown. His performance convinced DuPage head coach Bob MacDougall to move him to offense. In Bailey's first start as a running back, he recorded 14 carries for 150 yards. In only five games at running back, he finished the regular season with 74 carries for 496 rushing yards (6.7 yard average) and six touchdowns. DuPage went 11–1 on the season after defeating Fort Scott Community College (KS) in the Midwest Bowl. Bailey had 197 rushing yards in the game. He was named the NJCAA Region IV Player of the Year and earned a spot on the NJCAA All-America First-Team.

Bailey was inducted into the College of DuPage Athletic Hall of Fame in 2023.

=== University of Louisville (1992–1993) ===
Following his successful stint at DuPage, Bailey received a scholarship offer from the University of Louisville. At Louisville, he was converted to wide receiver while continuing to return kicks.

In his 1992 junior season, Bailey was the Cardinals' second-leading receiver with 13 catches for 352 yards (27.1 yard average) and one touchdown. He added 25 kick returns for 559 yards and 14 punt returns for 145 yards. In his first game for Louisville against #17-ranked Ohio State, Bailey had two receptions for 84 yards in a close 19–20 loss. His first NCAA touchdown came in a 32–27 victory over Tulsa on a 42-yard pass from quarterback Jeff Brohm in the first quarter. He finished the game with three receptions for 94 yards. Louisville went 5–6 on the season under head coach Howard Schnellenberger. Bailey was named the Cardinals' Outstanding Special Teams player of the year.

As a senior, Bailey was again Louisville's second-leading receiver. He finished the season with 26 receptions for 531 yards (20.4 yard average) and four touchdowns. As a returner, he recorded 26 kickoff returns for 622 yards and 10 punt returns for 130 yards and one touchdown. Bailey's best collegiate game came in week two against Memphis State where he caught six passes for 175 yards and two touchdowns and returned a punt for 67 yards and a touchdown. Overall, he had 322 all-purpose yards in the Cardinals' 52–28 victory. Louisville finished the year ranked #24 in the AP poll with a 9–3 record. They defeated Michigan State in the 1993 Liberty Bowl.

== Professional career ==
=== Indianapolis Colts (1994–1998) ===
Bailey went undrafted in the 1994 NFL draft, but was signed by the Indianapolis Colts as a rookie free agent on May 7, 1994. In his first season with the Colts, Bailey saw limited action behind wide receivers Sean Dawkins and Floyd Turner. He ended the season with two receptions for 30 yards in 13 appearances.

In 1995, Bailey's offensive production increased, and he came into his own as the Colts' top kick returner. He ended the year with 21 receptions for 379 yards and three touchdowns and added 21 kick returns for 495 yards and one touchdown. Bailey's first NFL touchdown came in a Week 3 27–24 overtime victory over the Miami Dolphins. Bailey caught a 21-yard pass from quarterback Jim Harbaugh to tie the game in the fourth quarter before Cary Blanchard kicked the winning field goal in overtime. Bailey began returning kicks later in the season, and in Week 15 against the Jacksonville Jaguars he returned the opening kickoff 95 yards for a touchdown. He followed his kick return touchdown with a 14-yard touchdown catch later in the first quarter, as the Colts won 41–31.

The Colts finished the regular season at 9–7 and earned a Wild Card spot in the 1995-96 NFL playoffs. They defeated the San Diego Chargers 35–20 in the Wild Card Round. In the Divisional Round, the Colts beat the Kansas City Chiefs 10–7 in a run-heavy game. They faced the Pittsburgh Steelers in the 1995 AFC Championship Game. Against the Steelers, Bailey had four kick returns for 70 yards and one catch for nine yards. However, he is best remembered for the final play of the game. Trailing 20–16 with time for one last play, quarterback Jim Harbaugh threw a Hail Mary pass that was tipped by Pittsburgh strong safety Myron Bell. As Bailey was falling to the ground, the ball ended up in his arms but was knocked free by Pittsburgh cornerback Randy Fuller. The ball briefly ended up on Bailey's chest, but officials ruled that Bailey dropped the ball and the Steelers advanced to Super Bowl XXX.

Bailey took over as the starting kick returner in the 1996 season, while he continued to back up Dawkins and rookie Marvin Harrison at wide receiver. As a receiver, Bailey recorded 18 catches for 302 yards on the season. As a kick returner, he had 43 returns for 1,041 yards and one touchdown. Bailey's lone touchdown on the season came in the final week against the Cincinnati Bengals when he returned a fourth-quarter kickoff for 95 yards. The Colts finished 9–7 and earned a playoff berth for the second straight season. In a rematch with the Pittsburgh Steelers during the Wild Card Round, the Colts lost 14–42. Bailey had a nine-yard touchdown reception in the game.

In 1997, the Colts were unable to capitalize on their previous two playoff-bound seasons. They were winless in their first 10 games before finishing with a 3–13 record. Bailey missed the final two games of the season with a thigh injury, but had 26 receptions for 329 yards and three touchdowns and returned 55 kickoffs for a career-high 1,206 yards on the year.

The 1998 season saw Bailey relegated to a full-time special teams player as he struggled with injuries. He played in nine games, recording 19 punt returns for 176 yards and 34 kickoff returns for 759 yards.

Following the 1998 season, Bailey was one of five players left unprotected by the Colts in the 1999 NFL expansion draft for the reactivated Cleveland Browns. Bailey was not selected by the Browns and was subsequently released by the Colts in January 1999.

Bailey left the Colts as the franchise leader in kickoff return yards. As of 2024, Bailey is ranked third in kickoff returns (153), second in return yards (3,501), and is tied for first in kickoff return touchdowns (2) in Colts history.

=== Oakland Raiders (1999) ===
Bailey was signed by the Oakland Raiders on August 12, 1999. He was released on August 31, 1999.

=== New England Patriots (2000) ===
Bailey was signed by the New England Patriots on March 9, 2000. He went through the offseason with the Patriots before being released on August 14, 2000.

=== Chicago Enforcers (2001) ===
Bailey was signed by the Chicago Enforcers of the XFL in 2001. He played in the XFL's lone season, where he was part of an Enforcers team that went 5–5 before losing in the playoffs to the Los Angeles Xtreme. Bailey finished the season with 32 catches for 546 yards and three touchdowns.

=== Carolina Cobras (2001–2002) ===
Bailey was signed by the Carolina Cobras of the Arena Football League (AFL) on May 30, 2001, as an offensive specialist. He joined the Cobras mid-way through their 2001 season, but still led the team in receiving with 61 receptions for 951 yards and 19 touchdowns. The Cobras went 7–7 on the regular season before losing to the Indiana Firebirds in the first round of the playoffs.

In 2002, Bailey again led Carolina in receiving with 91 catches for 1,114 yards and 18 touchdowns. He added four kick returns for 80 yards and one touchdown. Despite going 6–8 on the regular season, the Cobras earned a spot in the AFL playoffs. They beat the Grand Rapids Rampage in the first round before losing to the Arizona Rattlers in the quarterfinals.

=== San Jose SaberCats (2003) ===
Bailey signed with the San Jose SaberCats for the 2003 season. Bailey had 16 receptions for 233 yards and two touchdowns and seven carries for 12 yards and five touchdowns on the season. On special teams, Bailey had one blocked punt. The SaberCats went 12–4 and finished the regular season first in the Western Division. They beat the Georgia Force in the Quarterfinals of the 2003 AFL playoffs before losing to the Arizona Rattlers in the Semifinals.

=== New Orleans VooDoo (2004–2005) ===
In 2004, Bailey signed with the New Orleans VooDoo. He led the VooDoo in receiving for the 2004 season with 91 receptions for 1,364 yards and 32 touchdowns. He was also the team's leading kick returner with 46 returns for 900 yards and two touchdowns. The team went 11–5 before losing in the first round of the 2004 AFL playoffs to the Colorado Crush.

In 2005, Bailey again led the VooDoo in receiving with his best AFL statistical season. He had 144 receptions for 1,690 yards and 37 touchdowns, one rush for one touchdown, and 23 kick returns for 344 yards and one touchdown. The VooDoo went 9–7 on the season and missed the playoffs.

=== Grand Rapids Rampage (2006) ===
In 2006, Bailey signed with the Grand Rapids Rampage. He recorded 31 receptions for 302 yards and five touchdowns as the Rampage went 5–11 on the season.

== Professional career statistics ==
Legend
**Bold**	Career high

=== NFL statistics ===
Year	Team	Games		Receiving					Kick returns				
Year	Team	GP	GS	Rec	Yds	Avg	Lng	TD	KR	Yds	Avg	Lng	TD
1994	IND	13	0	2	30	15.0	23	0	–	–	–	–	–
1995	IND	**15**	3	36	**379**	18.0	**45**	**3**	21	495	23.6	**95**	**1**
1996	IND	14	2	18	302	16.8	40	0	43	1,041	**24.2**	**95**	**1**
1997	IND	13	**4**	**26**	329	12.7	22	**3**	**55**	**1,206**	21.9	61	0
1998	IND	9	0	–	–	–	–	–	34	759	22.3	44	0
Career		64	9	67	1,040	15.5	45	6	153	3,501	22.9	95	2

=== XFL statistics ===
Year	Team	Games		Receiving					Kick returns				
Year	Team	GP	GS	Rec	Yds	Avg	Lng	TD	KR	Yds	Avg	Lng	TD
2001	CHI	10	–	32	546	17.1	50	3	–	–	–	–	–
Career		10	–	32	546	17.1	50	3	–	–	–	–	–

=== AFL statistics ===
Year	Team	Games	Receiving				Rushing				Kick returns			
Year	Team	GP	Rec	Yds	Avg	TD	Att	Yds	Avg	TD	KR	Yds	Avg	TD
2001	CAR	8	61	915	**15.0**	19	1	2	**2.0**	0	5	44	8.8	0
2002	CAR	14	90	1,114	12.4	18	1	1	1.0	0	4	80	**20.0**	1
2003	SJC	16	16	233	14.6	2	**7**	**12**	1.7	**5**	2	16	8.0	0
2004	NOV	16	91	1,364	**15.0**	32	1	1	1.0	0	**46**	**900**	19.6	**2**
2005	NOV	16	**144**	**1,690**	11.7	**37**	1	1	1.0	0	23	344	15.0	1
2006	GRR	16	31	302	9.7	5	1	2	**2.0**	0	1	0	0.0	0
Career		96	433	5,618	13.0	113	12	19	1.6	6	81	1,384	17.1	4

== Personal life ==
Bailey lives in Kentwood, Michigan. He has seven children.

Bailey's son, Amari Bailey, played one season of college basketball for UCLA. He was selected by the Charlotte Hornets in the second round of the 2023 NBA draft with the 41st overall pick, and on July 14, 2023, he signed a two-way contract with the Hornets. He made his NBA debut in November 2023 for the Hornets, and his Israeli Basketball Premier League debut in 2026.
