= Brad Trout =

Brad Trout or A. Bradley Trout Jr was born and raised in Miami, Florida. He attended Hialeah Miami-Lakes High School where he played safety, served as a captain of the Trojans football team, and was selected for the All State Team. In 1993, he received a scholarship go Valdosta State University. His senior year, he was a captain, was awarded Blazers' Defensive Player of the Year and made the All-Gulf South Conference Team.

In 1998, he signed as a free agent with the Atlanta Falcons as a free safety. He went on to play for the Denver Broncos for two years where they allocated him to NFL Europe's Barcelona Dragons. While playing for the Dragons, he was awarded Defensive Player of the Week, made the All-NFL Europe Team and led the Dragons in tackles and interceptions. In 2000, Brad was drafted by the XFL's New York/New Jersey Hitmen where he was chosen as a defensive captain and made the all-XFL team (#36). After the XFL he was signed by the NFL's Kansas City Chiefs where he retired early due to injury. On March 24, 2002, Trout was waived by the Carolina Cobras.

Trout then became a physical education teacher for the lower, upper, and middle schools at The Walker School in Marietta, Georgia. He was also the defensive coordinator for Walker's high school football team. Trout was also the high school head golf coach. He left The Walker School in 2008. He has coached at South Cobb High School in Austell, Georgia, since 2009.
