= Fred Coleman =

American football player (born 1975)

No. 18, 84
- Position: Wide receiver

Personal information
- Born: January 31, 1975 (age 51); Tyler, Texas, U.S.
- Listed height: 6 ft 1 in (1.85 m)
- Listed weight: 192 lb (87 kg)

Career information
- High school: Lee (Tyler)
- College: Washington
- NFL draft: 1998: 6th round, 160th overall pick

Career history
- Buffalo Bills (1998)*; Philadelphia Eagles (1999)*; New York Jets (1999–2000)*; Chicago Enforcers (2001); Chicago Bears (2001)*; New England Patriots (2001–2002); San Francisco 49ers (2003)*; San Jose SaberCats (2004); Atlanta Falcons (2004)*; Nashville Kats (2005); San Jose SaberCats (2006); Georgia Force (2008)
- * Offseason or practice squad member only

Awards and highlights
- Super Bowl champion (XXXVI); ArenaBowl champion (2004)

Career NFL statistics
- Receptions: 2
- Receiving yards: 50
- Stats at Pro Football Reference

Career AFL statistics
- Receptions: 156
- Receiving yards: 1,802
- Receiving touchdowns: 30
- Stats at ArenaFan.com

Fredrick Dewayne Coleman (born January 31, 1975) is an American former professional football player who was a wide receiver in the National Football League (NFL), Arena Football League (AFL), and XFL. He played college football for the Washington Huskies.

Coleman graduated from Robert E. Lee High School in Tyler, Texas, and played for the Lee Red Raiders. He was selected in the sixth round of the 1998 NFL draft. Coleman only had two career receptions in the NFL, but one was a vital 46 yard slant play during the New England Patriots' 17–16 comeback win in Week 12 in 2001 against the Jets. His other catch came in week 17 against the Panthers. Coleman was also a contributor on special teams, as the Patriots made their way through the playoffs and onto the victory in Super Bowl XXXVI.

Currently, he is a coach at McKinney High School.
