= Junior Lord =

American football player (born 1976)

No. 82
- Position: Wide receiver

Personal information
- Born: March 11, 1976 (age 50); Greenwich, Connecticut
- Listed height: 6 ft 3 in (1.91 m)
- Listed weight: 210 lb (95 kg)

Career information
- High school: Brunswick (CT)
- College: Guilford (NC)
- NFL draft: 1998: undrafted

Career history
- Washington Redskins (1998–1999)*; Pittsburgh Steelers (1999)*; Green Bay Packers (2000)*; Amsterdam Admirals (2000); Chicago Enforcers (2001); Orlando Predators (2001); Green Bay Packers (2001)*; Detroit Lions (2001)*; Orlando Predators (2002); Detroit Fury (2003–2004); Las Vegas Gladiators (2005–2006)
- * Offseason or practice squad member only
- Stats at ArenaFan.com

Zechariah "Junior" Lord (born March 11, 1976) is an American former football wide receiver. He now is an owner of Jardin Dispensary in Las Vegas and is its chief marketing officer

== College career ==
He attended Guilford College in North Carolina and played from 1994 to 1997. He holds the receiving records there. Was the 1st player in conference history to receive all conference four years in a row. Was named honorable mention All-American as a junior and All-American honors as a Senior.

== Professional career ==
=== NFL ===
Lord entered the National Football League as a free agent in 1998, signing with the Washington Redskins. He would spend 1 season on their practice squad. In 1999, he was released from the Washington Redskins after final roster cuts during the preseason and signed on with the Pittsburgh Steelers to their practice squad. In 2000, he signed with the Green Bay Packers where he was allocated to the Amsterdam Admirals of NFL Europe. Coming out of college, Lord ran a solid 4.46 in the 40 yard dash which caught the attention on scouts due to his size. He also jumped well recording a 37.5 inch vertical jump.

=== XFL ===
Lord played in the only season of the XFL being selected by the Chicago Enforcers in the 2001 XFL draft.

=== AFL ===
Lord started his Arena Football League career by playing 2 seasons (2001–2002) for the Orlando Predators. He would go on to play for the Detroit Fury (2003–2004) and the Las Vegas Gladiators (2005–2006).
