= Tony Ramirez =

American football player (born 1973)

No. 75, 60
- Position: Offensive tackle

Personal information
- Born: January 26, 1973 (age 53); Lincoln, Nebraska, U.S.

Career information
- College: Northern Colorado
- NFL draft: 1997: 6th round, 168th overall pick

Career history
- Detroit Lions (1997–1999); Chicago Enforcers (2001)

Career NFL statistics
- Games played: 30
- Games started: 10
- Fumble recoveries: 1
- Stats at Pro Football Reference

Tony Ramirez (born January 26, 1973) is an American former professional football player who was an offensive tackle in the National Football League (NFL) and XFL. He played college football for the Northern Colorado Bears. He played three years for the NFL's Detroit Lions (1997–1999) and the XFL's Chicago Enforcers (2001).
