= Tim Lester (American football coach) =

American football coach (born 1977)

Iowa Hawkeyes
- Title: Offensive coordinator

Personal information
- Born: February 8, 1977 (age 49); Wheaton, Illinois, U.S.
- Listed height: 6 ft 1 in (1.85 m)
- Listed weight: 208 lb (94 kg)

Career information
- Position: Quarterback (No. 13)
- High school: Wheaton Warrenville South
- College: Western Michigan (1996–1999)
- NFL draft: 2000: undrafted

Career history

Playing
- Chicago Enforcers (2001); Nashville Kats (2001); Memphis Xplorers (2001); Carolina Cobras (2002)*; Memphis Xplorers (2002)
- * Offseason or practice squad member only

Coaching
- Wheaton Warrenville South HS (IL) (2000) Offensive coordinator; Saint Benedict at Auburndale (TN) (2001) Offensive coordinator; Elmhurst (2002–2003) Offensive coordinator; Saint Joseph's (IN) (2004) Head coach; Western Michigan (2005–2006) Quarterbacks coach; North Central (2007) Assistant head coach & defensive coordinator; Elmhurst (2008–2012) Head coach; Syracuse (2013–2014) Quarterbacks coach & recruiting coordinator; Syracuse (2014–2015) Offensive coordinator & quarterbacks coach; Purdue (2016) Quarterbacks coach; Western Michigan (2017–2022) Head coach; Green Bay Packers (2023) Senior analyst; Iowa (2024–present) Offensive coordinator

Awards and highlights
- IFA Coach of the Year (2004); CCIW Coach of the Year (2012); MAC Co-Freshman of the Year (1996); 2× Second-team All-MAC (1998, 1999)

Head coaching record
- Postseason: 2–3 (.400) (NCAA D-III playoffs/bowl games)
- Career: NCAA: 67–55 (.549)

Timothy Frederick Lester (born February 8, 1977) is an American football coach who is the offensive coordinator at the University of Iowa football. He was previously on the Green Bay Packers coaching staff. Prior to that, Lester was the head football coach at Western Michigan University from 2017 to 2022. He played quarterback at Western Michigan from 1996 to 1999 and professionally for the Chicago Enforcers of the XFL in 2001. He then served as the head football coach at Saint Joseph's College in 2004 and at Elmhurst College from 2008 to 2012.

== Early life ==
Lester attended Wheaton Warrenville South High School in Wheaton, Illinois. As a senior, Lester threw for 1,732 yards and 17 touchdowns (TDs) with two interceptions before succumbing to a knee injury in the playoffs. He was subsequently named second-team all-state by the Chicago Tribune. In two years as a starting quarterback, he completed 60 percent of his passes for 3,632 yards and 38 TDs with six interceptions. Prior to his injury, Lester had been considered a blue chip prospect and planned on committing to Florida and head coach Steve Spurrier.

== College career ==
Lester threw for 11,299 passing yards with 87 TDs during his career, setting 17 school records after being recruited to WMU and winning MAC Freshman of the Year under head coach Al Molde and subsequently Gary Darnell and offensive coordinator Bill Cubit. Lester finished his career ranked fourth all time in NCAA Division I for passing yards and sixth in touchdowns.

Following his senior season, Lester participated in the 1999 Blue-Gray Classic.

In 2011, Lester was named to the Western Michigan University Athletic Hall of Fame.

== Professional career ==
Although Lester was scouted by several professional teams in college, he went undrafted in the 2000 NFL draft.

=== Chicago Enforcers ===
On October 28, 2000, Lester was drafted by the Chicago Enforcers in the sixth round of the 2001 XFL Draft, 41st overall. He won the starting quarterback job over Kevin McDougal and Paul Failla. In Week 1 against the Orlando Rage, Lester completed 12 of 20 passes for 134 yards, three touchdowns, and two interceptions in a 33–29 loss. The following week against the eventual XFL champions, the Los Angeles Xtreme, he went 11 of 19 for 220 yards with two touchdowns in a 39–32 double-overtime loss. Lester and the Enforcers' offense struggled over the next two weeks against Birmingham and New York/New Jersey, scoring a combined three points in the losses, and he was ultimately benched during the fourth game of that stretch. He appeared in four games, completing 40 of 76 passes for 554 yards with four touchdowns and five interceptions, as the Enforcers lost all four of his starts.

=== Nashville Kats ===
At the conclusion of the XFL season, Lester signed with the Nashville Kats of the Arena Football League (AFL) on April 25, 2001, but did not appear in a game or record any statistics during his tenure with the team.

=== Memphis Xplorers ===
On May 15, 2001, Lester signed with the Memphis Xplorers of af2. He made his first appearance with the team against the Bossier City Battle Wings. During the 2001 season, he played in 10 games, completing 170 of 322 passes for 1,961 yards with 37 touchdowns and nine interceptions.

Following the season, Lester signed with the Carolina Cobras on November 29, 2001, but was later granted his release on March 13, 2002, amid a competitive quarterback situation and his desire to continue playing. He subsequently re-signed with the Xplorers and returned as the team’s starting quarterback. In the 2002 season, Lester completed 315 of 538 passes for 3,817 yards with 65 touchdowns and 27 interceptions, while also rushing for seven touchdowns.

== Coaching career ==
Immediately following his playing career at WMU, Lester returned to his alma mater Wheaton Warrenville South high school as a math teacher. He also served as offensive coordinator for the varsity football team for one season. He continued to hold that job while playing for the XFL, effectively playing as a semi-professional.

Lester then spent one season as the head coach of NCAA Division II Saint Joseph's College in 2004. Following the season he was named the 2004 Independent Football Alliance (IFA) Coach of the Year.

Lester returned to WMU to serve as quarterbacks coach from 2005 to 2006. The move reunited him with new Broncos head coach Bill Cubit. The two had previous success with Lester as quarterback and Cubit as offensive coordinator and quarterbacks coach from 1997 to 1999. Lester was instrumental in recruiting quarterback Tim Hiller, an All-MAC performer that surpassed several of Lester's previous school passing records. Lester voluntarily left his position following the 2006 season in order to find employment closer to his family in the Chicago area. He found that at NCAA Division III North Central College, where he served as defensive coordinator for the 2007 season.

=== Elmhurst ===
In 2008, Lester was named the head coach of the Division III Elmhurst College Bluejays. In 2012 Lester was named the College Conference of Illinois and Wisconsin (CCIW) Coach of the Year after leading the Bluejays to their first NCAA Playoff appearance in school history. The conference championship was the first for the football program since 1980. The 2012, the Bluejays featured running back Scottie Williams, the Gagliardi Trophy award winner as the most outstanding player in Division III.

=== Syracuse ===
In 2013, Lester resigned from Elmhurst to accept an offer to be the quarterbacks coach and recruiting coordinator at Syracuse. The move reunited him with Orange head coach Scott Shafer and offensive coordinator George McDonald, all of whom had previously served on the same Western Michigan staff from 2005 to 2006. On October 6, 2014, McDonald was demoted from offensive coordinator to wide receivers coach by Shafer. Lester was promoted from quarterbacks coach to offensive coordinator and play caller. He was let go after new athletics director Mark Coyle fired head coach Scott Shafer.

=== Purdue ===
On December 28, 2015, Purdue hired Lester to become its quarterbacks coach. Lester coached David Blough, and Purdue averaged 294.9 passing yards a game, ranking 21st in the country. He was not retained by incoming head coach Jeff Brohm.

=== Western Michigan ===
On January 13, 2017, Lester was hired as head coach at Western Michigan. Lester's base contract pays him $800,000 per year. Western Michigan fired Lester following the 2022 season, in which the team finished 5–7. In six seasons, Lester's teams compiled a 37–32 record.

=== Green Bay Packers ===
On March 10, 2023, Lester was hired by the Green Bay Packers as their senior analyst. Lester and Packers head coach Matt LaFleur had been teammates at Western Michigan in 1998 and 1999.

=== Iowa ===
On January 31, 2024, Lester was hired as offensive coordinator by Iowa.

== Career statistics ==
=== Professional ===
==== XFL ====
| Year | Team | Games | | | Passing | | | | | | | | Rushing | | | |
| Year | Team | GP | GS | Record | Cmp | Att | Pct | Yds | Y/A | TD | Int | Rtg | Att | Yds | Avg | TD |
|---|---|---|---|---|---|---|---|---|---|---|---|---|---|---|---|---|
| 2001 | CHI | 4 | 4 | 0–4 | 40 | 77 | 51.9 | 581 | 7.5 | 4 | 5 | 67.1 | 12 | 34 | 2.8 | 1 |
| Career | | 4 | 4 | 0–4 | 40 | 77 | 51.9 | 581 | 7.5 | 4 | 5 | 67.1 | 12 | 34 | 2.8 | 1 |

==== AF2 ====
| Year | Team | Games | | | Passing | | | | | | | | Rushing | | | |
| Year | Team | GP | GS | Record | Cmp | Att | Pct | Yds | Y/A | TD | Int | Rtg | Att | Yds | Avg | TD |
|---|---|---|---|---|---|---|---|---|---|---|---|---|---|---|---|---|
| 2001 | MEM | 10 | 9 | 2–7 | 170 | 322 | 52.8 | 1,961 | 6.1 | 37 | 9 | 88.5 | 6 | 3 | 0.5 | 1 |
| 2002 | MEM | 16 | 16 | 5–11 | 315 | 538 | 58.6 | 3,817 | 7.1 | 65 | 26 | 90.5 | 29 | 13 | 0.4 | 7 |
| Career | | 26 | 25 | 7–18 | 485 | 860 | 56.4 | 5,778 | 6.7 | 102 | 35 | 89.9 | 35 | 16 | 0.5 | 8 |

=== College ===
| Season | Team | Games | | | Passing | | | | | | | | Rushing | | | |
| Season | Team | GP | GS | Record | Cmp | Att | Pct | Yds | Y/A | TD | Int | Rtg | Att | Yds | Avg | TD |
|---|---|---|---|---|---|---|---|---|---|---|---|---|---|---|---|---|
| 1995 | Western Michigan | 0 | 0 | — | Redshirted (redshirt) | | | | | | | | | | | |
| 1996 | Western Michigan | 11 | 11 | 2–9 | 203 | 363 | 55.9 | 2,189 | 6.0 | 14 | 9 | 114.3 | 59 | –30 | –0.5 | 2 |
| 1997 | Western Michigan | 10 | 9 | 6–3 | 154 | 268 | 57.5 | 2,160 | 8.1 | 17 | 11 | 137.9 | 56 | –102 | –1.8 | 0 |
| 1998 | Western Michigan | 11 | 11 | 7–4 | 236 | 406 | 58.1 | 3,311 | 8.2 | 22 | 16 | 136.6 | 70 | –49 | –0.7 | 1 |
| 1999 | Western Michigan | 12 | 12 | 7–5 | 282 | 470 | 60.0 | 3,639 | 7.7 | 34 | 13 | 143.4 | 55 | 154 | 2.8 | 1 |
| Career | | 44 | 43 | 22–21 | 875 | 1,507 | 58.1 | 11,299 | 7.5 | 87 | 49 | 133.6 | 240 | –27 | –0.1 | 4 |

== Head coaching record ==
| Year | Team | Overall | Conference | Standing | Bowl/playoffs |
|---|---|---|---|---|---|
Saint Joseph's Pumas (NCAA Division II independent) (2004)
| 2004 | Saint Joseph's | 7–4 | | | |
| Saint Joseph's: | | 7–4 | | | |
Elmhurst Bluejays (College Conference of Illinois and Wisconsin) (2008–2012)
| 2008 | Elmhurst | 7–3 | 4–3 | 4th | |
| 2009 | Elmhurst | 4–6 | 1–6 | 7th | |
| 2010 | Elmhurst | 6–4 | 3–4 | T–5th | |
| 2011 | Elmhurst | 6–4 | 4–3 | 4th | |
| 2012 | Elmhurst | 0–2 (10 wins vacated) (Note: In 2017 the NCAA forced Elmhurst to vacate 10 wins (6 conference) from the 2012 season because of financial aid violations.) | 0–1 | T–1st | L NCAA Division III Quarterfinal |
| Elmhurst: | | 23–19 | 12–17 | | |
Western Michigan Broncos (Mid-American Conference) (2017–2022)
| 2017 | Western Michigan | 6–6 | 4–4 | 4th (West) | |
| 2018 | Western Michigan | 7–6 | 5–3 | T–2nd (West) | L Famous Idaho Potato |
| 2019 | Western Michigan | 7–6 | 5–3 | 2nd (West) | L First Responder |
| 2020 | Western Michigan | 4–2 | 4–2 | T–2nd (West) | |
| 2021 | Western Michigan | 8–5 | 4–4 | T–4th (West) | W Quick Lane |
| 2022 | Western Michigan | 5–7 | 4–4 | 3rd (West) | |
| Western Michigan: | | 37–32 | 26–20 | | |
| Total: | | 67–55 | | | |
National championship Conference title Conference division title or championship game berth
