= Kevin McDougal =

American gridiron football player (born 1972)

No. 15
- Position: Quarterback

Personal information
- Born: May 29, 1972 (age 54); Pompano Beach, Florida, U.S.
- Listed height: 6 ft 2 in (1.88 m)
- Listed weight: 194 lb (88 kg)

Career information
- High school: Blanche Ely (Pompano Beach)
- College: Notre Dame
- NFL draft: 1994: undrafted

Career history
- Los Angeles Rams (1994)*; London Monarchs (1995); Winnipeg Blue Bombers (1995–1997); Milwaukee Mustangs (1998–2001); Chicago Enforcers (2001); Georgia Force (2002)
- * Offseason or practice squad member only

Awards and highlights
- All-Rookie Team (1998)

Career CFL statistics
- Comp. / Att.: 98 /162
- Passing yards: 1,274
- TD–INT: 7-8
- QB rating: 79.1
- Rushing TD: 0

Career AFL statistics
- Comp. / Att.: 594 /977
- Passing yards: 7,745
- TD–INT: 134-31
- QB rating: 106.85
- Rushing TD: 11
- Stats at ArenaFan.com

Kevin T. McDougal (born May 29, 1972) is best known as the starting quarterback for the University of Notre Dame football team who narrowly missed winning the national championship in 1993. He is currently a real estate investor in South Florida.

== College career ==
McDougal played four seasons under head coach Lou Holtz and served as the backup quarterback during his first three years behind Rick Mirer. Entering his senior season, he competed for the starting role with true freshman Ron Powlus, who suffered a shoulder injury in a preseason scrimmage and subsequently redshirted, leaving McDougal as the starter.

In the season opener against Northwestern, McDougal led Notre Dame to a 27–12 victory. He guided the Irish to a 9–0 start, setting up a Week 10 matchup against No. 1 Florida State. In the game, No. 2 Notre Dame defeated No. 1 Florida State, 31–24, in a contest widely referred to as the "Game of the Century," earning the top ranking in the country. However, the following week, Notre Dame was upset by No. 17 Boston College in the Holy War, eliminating them from national championship contention.

In the 1994 Cotton Bowl Classic against Texas A&M, McDougal led the Irish to a 24–21 victory, completing 7 of 15 passes for 105 yards and adding 13 rushing yards, including a touchdown. For the season, he led Notre Dame to an 11–1 record while missing one game due to injury. He threw for 1,451 yards with seven touchdowns and five interceptions, and added four rushing touchdowns.

=== Statistics ===
Season	Team	Games (Note: McDougal’s statistics from his bowl game appearances are excluded, as bowl game statistics were not officially counted toward season or career totals prior to 2002.)			Passing								Rushing			
Season	Team	GP	GS	Record	Cmp	Att	Pct	Yds	Y/A	TD	Int	Rtg	Att	Yds	Avg	TD
1990	Notre Dame	11	0	—	1	2	50.0	10	5.0	0	0	92.0	1	3	3.0	0
1991	Notre Dame	3	0	—	5	8	62.5	46	5.8	0	0	110.8	4	30	7.5	1
1992	Notre Dame	11	0	—	8	11	72.7	177	16.1	3	1	279.7	11	41	3.7	1
1993	Notre Dame	11	11	10−1	98	159	61.6	1,541	9.7	7	5	151.3	55	85	1.5	4
Career		36	11	10−1	112	180	61.6	1,774	9.9	10	6	156.7	71	159	2.2	6

== Professional career ==
=== Los Angeles Rams ===
In April 1994, McDougal signed as an undrafted free agent with the Los Angeles Rams but did not make the final roster.

=== London Monarchs ===
On March 21, 1995, McDougal signed with the London Monarchs of the World League of American Football. He served as the backup quarterback to Brad Johnson and split time with Jim Ballard. During the season, he completed 16 of 36 passes for 162 yards with two interceptions.

=== Winnipeg Blue Bombers ===
Following the 1995 WLAF season, McDougal signed with the Winnipeg Blue Bombers of the Canadian Football League. Over three seasons with the Blue Bombers, he appeared in 27 games and started 12, recording starts in each season. During that time, he completed 185 of 327 passes for 2,356 yards with nine touchdowns and 16 interceptions, while adding 429 rushing yards and two rushing touchdowns. He was released on October 9, 1997, with three games remaining in the season.

=== Milwaukee Mustangs ===
In 1998, McDougal signed with the Milwaukee Mustangs of the Arena Football League. He started over veteran Todd Hammel in the season opener against Florida, completing 15 of 26 passes for three touchdowns. All three scores went to wide receiver Gary Compton, including a 45-yard touchdown on the first offensive play of the season. Over the 1998 season, he appeared in five games (one start), completing 33 of 65 passes for 584 yards with 11 touchdowns and two interceptions. He was named to the AFL All-Rookie Team. He returned as Hammel's backup during the 1999 season and did not play in the regular season. Following Hammel's departure, McDougal was named the starter and completed 285 of 442 passes for 3,887 yards with 73 touchdowns and 17 interceptions, setting team records for touchdowns and yardage. After his stint with the Chicago Enforcers of the XFL, McDougal returned to the Mustangs in Week six against the San Jose Sabercats, throwing for 292 yards and five touchdowns. In 10 games, he finished the season with 2,414 yards on 285 of 344 passing with 36 touchdowns and nine interceptions, while adding eight rushing touchdowns.

=== Chicago Enforcers ===
McDougal signed with the Chicago Enforcers of the XFL through a territorial selection on October 28, 2000. He began the season as the backup quarterback to Tim Lester. In Week 3, he made his Enforcers debut against the Birmingham Thunderbolts, completing 3 of 6 passes for 34 yards in a 14–3 loss. Following an 0–4 start, McDougal earned his first start. In that start against the Las Vegas Outlaws, he led the Enforcers to their first win, completing 17 of 22 passes for 168 yards with one interception, overcoming a 13-point deficit in a 15–13 victory. He was named Offensive Player of the Week. After a loss to Memphis, McDougal led Chicago to four consecutive wins, becoming playoff-eligible. This included a Week 10 victory against Orlando, where he completed 13 of 20 passes for 183 yards with one touchdown and added 34 rushing yards and a rushing touchdown in a 23–6 win. He also earned Offensive Player of the Week honors again in Week 9, joining teammate John Avery as the only other player in the league to do so. In the semifinal matchup against Los Angeles, McDougal struggled, completing 15 of 31 passes for 228 yards with three interceptions. Following the completion of the season, he returned to the Milwaukee Mustangs.

=== Georgia Force ===
On January 14, 2002, McDougal signed with the Georgia Force of the Arena Football League, an expansion team in its first season. He began the season as the team’s starting quarterback. In Week five against the Chicago Rush, McDougal was benched for former Mustangs teammate Donnie Davis. After a 1–4 start, McDougal was released and later retired.

== Professional career statistics ==
CFL

Year	Team	Games			Passing								Rushing			
Year	Team	GP	GS	Record	Cmp	Att	Pct	Yds	Y/A	TD	Int	Rtg	Att	Yds	Y/A	TD
1995	WPG	8	3	1–2	40	65	61.5	515	7.9	1	3	72.3	16	115	7.2	1
1996	WPG	6	3	1–2	47	100	47.0	567	4.5	1	5	34.7	5	6	1.2	1
1997	WPG	13	6	1–5	98	162	60.5	1,274	7.9	7	8	79.1	34	308	9.1	0
Career		27	12	3–9	185	327	56.6	2,356	7.2	9	16	68.0	55	429	7.8	2

WLAF

Year	Team	Games			Passing								Rushing			
Year	Team	GP	GS	Record	Cmp	Att	Pct	Yds	Y/A	TD	Int	Rtg	Att	Yds	Avg	TD
1995	London	?	?	?–?	16	36	44.4	162	4.5	0	2	34.7	5	9	1.8	0
Career		?	?	?–?	16	36	44.4	162	4.5	0	2	34.7	5	9	1.8	0

AFL

Year	Team	Games			Passing								Rushing			
Year	Team	GP	GS	Record	Cmp	Att	Pct	Yds	Y/A	TD	Int	Rtg	Att	Yds	Y/A	TD
1998	MIL	5	1	1–0	33	65	50.8	584	9.0	11	2	108.6	6	-12	-2.0	0
1999	MIL	0	0	—	DNP											
2000	MIL	14	14	7–7	285	442	64.6	3,887	8.8	73	17	116.0	16	40	2.5	3
2001	MIL	10	10	2–8	204	344	59.3	2,414	7.0	36	9	104.7	16	18	1.1	8
2002	GA	6	5	1–4	72	126	57.1	860	6.8	14	3	105.3	1	-3	-3.0	0
Career		35	30	11–19	594	977	60.8	7,745	7.9	134	31	00.0	39	43	1.1	11

XFL

Year	Team	Games			Passing								Rushing			
Year	Team	GP	GS	Record	Cmp	Att	Pct	Yds	Y/A	TD	Int	Rtg	Att	Yds	Avg	TD
2001	CHI	7	6	5–1	81	134	60.4	1,168	8.7	5	3	91.9	17	88	5.2	1
Career		7	6	5–1	81	134	60.4	1,168	8.7	5	3	91.9	17	88	5.2	1
