= Isaac Davis (American football) =

American football player (born 1972)

No. 73, 77, 69
- Position: Guard

Personal information
- Born: April 8, 1972 (age 54); Malvern, Arkansas, U.S.
- Listed height: 6 ft 3 in (1.91 m)
- Listed weight: 320 lb (145 kg)

Career information
- High school: Malvern
- College: Arkansas
- NFL draft: 1994: 2nd round, 43rd overall pick

Career history
- San Diego Chargers (1994–1997); New Orleans Saints (1997); Minnesota Vikings (1998); Oakland Raiders (1999)*; Las Vegas Outlaws (2001); Chicago Enforcers (2001); Memphis Maniax (2001)
- * Offseason or practice squad member only

Awards and highlights
- Second-team All-SEC (1993)

Career NFL statistics
- Games played: 58
- Games started: 31
- Stats at Pro Football Reference

John Isaac Davis (born April 8, 1972) is an American former professional football player who was a guard in the National Football League (NFL). He played for the San Diego Chargers, New Orleans Saints and Minnesota Vikings. Davis played college football for the Arkansas Razorbacks and was named to Arkansas' All-Decade Team for the 1990s.

== Early life and college ==
Davis was an All-State performer at Malvern High School, playing on both the offensive and defensive line. He accepted a scholarship offer to play for the University of Arkansas under then-head coach Ken Hatfield, where he became strictly an offensive lineman. Davis was named Third-team All-American and First-team All-SEC following both his junior and senior seasons.

== Professional career ==
=== NFL ===
Isaac Davis was taken in the second round (43rd pick) of the 1994 NFL draft by the San Diego Chargers, going ahead of such notable players as Larry Allen, Jason Sehorn, and Jason Gildon. Davis, who started for the Chargers in Super Bowl XXIX, played in 58 games over a six-year career, starting 31 times. In addition to games played for the Chargers and the Saints, Davis was briefly a member of the Minnesota Vikings during the 1998 season, but did not see any game action. In 1999, Davis was signed as a free agent by the Oakland Raiders, but he failed to make the regular season roster.

=== XFL ===
Davis was selected with the 165th pick of the XFL Draft, but was traded to the Chicago Enforcers. He was then traded during the pre-season to the Memphis Maniax for quarterback Craig Whelihan, making him part of the first trade in league history.

== Personal life ==
Isaac Davis is currently an assistant football coach at Parkview Arts and Science Magnet High School, where he is also a special education teacher. Davis and his wife have 4 daughters. He also has a son, who is currently (2016) playing for Arkansas State University, from a previous marriage.. He is a member of Phi Beta Sigma fraternity. Davis served as the Honorary Captain for the Razorbacks' game against LSU during the 2010 season.
