= Paul Failla =

American football and baseball player and coach (born 1972)

No. 5
- Position: Quarterback

Personal information
- Born: December 8, 1972 (age 53)
- Listed height: 6 ft 2 in (1.88 m)
- Listed weight: 190 lb (86 kg)

Career information
- High school: North Allegheny (Wexford, Pennsylvania)
- College: Notre Dame (1991–1993); IUP (1998)
- NFL draft: 1999: undrafted

Career history

Playing
- New Jersey Red Dogs (1999); Carolina Panthers (2000)*; Chicago Enforcers (2001)
- * Offseason or practice squad member only

Coaching
- Saint Francis (2002–2005) Offensive coordinator; Indiana University of Pennsylvania (2006) Offensive coordinator

Paul J. Failla (born December 8, 1972) is an American former football and baseball player and coach.

== Early life ==
Failla attended North Allegheny Senior High School in Wexford, Pennsylvania, where he excelled in both football and baseball and was named Post-Gazette Athlete of the Year in 1991. As a senior, he threw for 2,576 yards and rushed for an additional 844 yards, leading his team to championships in the Western Pennsylvania Interscholastic Athletic League (WPIAL) and the Pennsylvania Interscholastic Athletic Association (PIAA). In baseball, he played shortstop and was a three-year varsity player. As a senior, he batted .435 and was named Pennsylvania Player of the Year. Over his three seasons, the team won two WPIAL titles. In 2015, he was inducted into the WPIAL Hall of Fame.

== College career ==
=== Notre Dame ===
Failla was recruited out of North Allegheny Senior High School by the University of Notre Dame, where he became a two-sport athlete. He played shortstop for the baseball team while serving as a backup quarterback on the football team.

==== Football ====
In 1991, his true freshman season, Failla served as the backup to Rick Mirer and split time with Kevin McDougal under head coach Lou Holtz. In Week 4 against Purdue, with Mirer limited by a rib injury, Failla made his first career start but was replaced after a scoreless first quarter as Notre Dame went on to win 45–20. He appeared in seven games that season, completing both of his passes for 17 yards while adding 29 rushing yards on 10 carries. In 1992, he completed 2 of 7 passes for 31 yards with an interception and added his first collegiate rushing touchdown. In 1993, following Mirer’s departure to the NFL, Failla competed with McDougal and freshman Ron Powlus for the starting job. After Powlus suffered a preseason injury, McDougal was named starter and Failla the primary backup. In Week 8 against the USC Trojans, with McDougal sidelined by a shoulder sprain, Failla made his second career start and led undefeated, No. 2 Notre Dame to a 31–13 victory. He finished the 1993 season completing 19 of 25 passes for 281 yards and three touchdowns. Following the season, he left the football program after being selected in the third round of the 1994 MLB June Amateur Draft by the California Angels.

==== Baseball ====
Failla was drafted by the Kansas City Royals in the seventh round of the 1991 MLB draft but elected not to sign, instead attending Notre Dame. In 1992, he hit .292 with 18 extra-base hits in 61 games while also stealing 14 bases. In the summer, he played collegiate summer baseball with the Brewster Whitecaps of the Cape Cod Baseball League. In 1993, he appeared in 53 games and batted .346 with 15 doubles, three triples, and five home runs, driving in 45 runs and scoring 55, while also posting 37 walks against 24 strikeouts. Following the 1994 season, Failla was selected in the third round of the 1994 MLB draft by the California Angels. After signing with the organization, his professional contract made him ineligible to continue playing college football, ending his Notre Dame football career prior to the 1994 season.

=== IUP ===
Following his professional baseball career, Failla enrolled at Indiana University of Pennsylvania (IUP), where he used his final season of NCAA eligibility with the Crimson Hawks football team. In 1998, he led IUP to a 10–2 record and a playoff appearance while starting at quarterback. He threw for 2,067 yards with 15 touchdowns and nine interceptions, and also added five rushing touchdowns.

== Professional career ==
=== California / Anaheim Angels ===
In 1994, Failla joined the Boise Hawks, appearing in 62 games and batting .221 (46-for-208). The following season, he played for the Cedar Rapids Kernels, appearing in a career-high 129 games and hitting .253 with 23 doubles, four triples, two home runs, 48 RBIs, and a team-high 77 runs scored, while also stealing 30 bases in 49 attempts. He was selected as a Midwest League All-Star. He spent the next two seasons with the Lake Elsinore Storm of the California League, the High-A affiliate, batting a combined .219 over 194 games. Over his four-year minor league career, Failla appeared in 385 games, recording 303 hits, 196 runs scored, 152 RBIs, 61 doubles, 10 triples, and four home runs, along with 39 stolen bases.

=== New Jersey Red Dogs ===
After graduating from IUP, Failla signed with the Arena Football League's New Jersey Red Dogs in 1999 but did not record any statistics.

=== Carolina Panthers ===
On April 25, 2000, Failla signed with the Carolina Panthers of the National Football League. He was released prior to the start of the regular season.

=== Chicago Enforcers ===
On October 28, 2000, Failla was selected with the ninth overall pick by the Chicago Enforcers in the 2001 XFL draft. He served as the backup quarterback behind Tim Lester and also saw reserve duties alongside fellow Notre Dame alumnus Kevin McDougal. In limited action, Failla completed 1 of 5 passes for five yards and added two carries for six yards.

== Coaching career ==
=== Saint Francis ===
On February 1, 2002, Failla accepted the position of offensive coordinator at Saint Francis University. In the 2005 season, his offense set school records for passing yards (3,223), total offense (4,479), and touchdowns (37). He developed multiple all-conference players, including quarterback Anthony Doria (NEC Offensive Player of the Year), wide receiver Luke Palko, running back Todd Harris, and Division I-AA All-American wide receiver Michael Caputo and quarterback/wide receiver Joe DeLeo. Under Failla, Palko and Caputo tied the NCAA Division I record for most receptions by two teammates in a career.

=== IUP ===
He then returned to his alma mater at IUP in February 2006 as the offensive coordinator under head coach Lou Tepper, but resigned three months later to pursue business interests. He is currently featured as a regular guest on Pittsburgh's KDKA Sports Showdown.

== Career statistics ==
=== College ===
Season	Team	Games			Passing								Rushing			
Season	Team	GP	GS	Record	Cmp	Att	Pct	Yds	Y/A	TD	Int	Rtg	Att	Yds	Avg	TD
1991	Notre Dame	7	1	1–0	2	2	100.0	17	8.5	0	0	171.4	10	29	2.9	0
1992	Notre Dame	11	0	—	2	7	28.6	31	4.4	0	1	37.2	4	2	0.5	1
1993	Notre Dame	11	1	1–0	19	25	76.0	281	11.2	3	0	210.0	18	55	3.1	0
1994	CAL	Did not play – MiLB for California Angels organization														
1995	CAL	Did not play – MiLB for California Angels organization														
1996	CAL	Did not play – MiLB for California Angels organization														
1997	ANA	Did not play – MiLB for California Angels organization														
1998	IUP	12	12	10–2	154	297	51.9	2,067	7.0	15	9	120.9	64	-6	-0.1	5
FBS career		29	2	2–0	23	34	67.6	329	9.7	3	1	172.2	32	86	2.7	1
D-II career		12	12	10–2	154	297	51.9	2,067	7.0	15	9	120.9	64	-6	-0.1	5
