= Chicago Enforcers =

American football team

Logo

General information
- Founded: 2001
- Folded: 2001
- Stadium: Soldier Field
- Headquartered: Chicago, Illinois
- Colors: Black, purple, silver

Personnel
- Owner: World Wrestling Federation
- Head coach: Ron Meyer

League / conference affiliations
- XFL; Eastern Division

Playoff appearances (1)
- (2001)

The Chicago Enforcers were an American football team of the XFL based at Soldier Field in Chicago, Illinois. The XFL was begun by Vince McMahon of the WWE and by NBC, a major television network in the United States. NBC dropped XFL broadcasts after the first season in 2001 due to dismal ratings, and the league was dissolved shortly thereafter.

The team name references mob enforcers, alluding to Chicago's history of mafia influence. The team's fight song would later become the entrance music for professional wrestler Brock Lesnar who had signed a contract with the WWE but was yet to debut.

The "Chicago Enforcers" name is used by the Chicago Police Department for their works team in the National Public Safety Football League.

== 2001 season ==
Originally, rumors swirled that former Chicago Bears defensive coordinator and Philadelphia Eagles head coach Buddy Ryan would be hired as the team's coach. Ultimately, Hall of Fame linebacker Dick Butkus was hired for the position. However, just before the season started, he resigned to take a position in the XFL office. He was replaced by Ron Meyer, a former NFL head coach from the 1980s who had not coached professional football since 1994 with the Las Vegas Posse.

Among their players was former NFL running back LeShon Johnson, who had played for the Green Bay Packers, Arizona Cardinals and the New York Giants and was a finalist for the 1993 Heisman Trophy. He was starting tailback for the Cardinals for most of 1996. He led the Enforcers with 6 rushing touchdowns, which was second in the league. They also had former NFL running back John Avery who played for the Miami Dolphins. Their wide receiver/kick returner Roell Preston (who previously played for the Atlanta Falcons, Green Bay Packers, Miami Dolphins, San Francisco 49ers, and Tennessee Titans) held the distinction of being the only former Pro Bowler (1998 as a Packer) to play in the XFL. The team's starting right guard, Bennie Anderson, went on to be a starter for the Baltimore Ravens and Buffalo Bills, and last played professional football in 2006 for the Miami Dolphins.

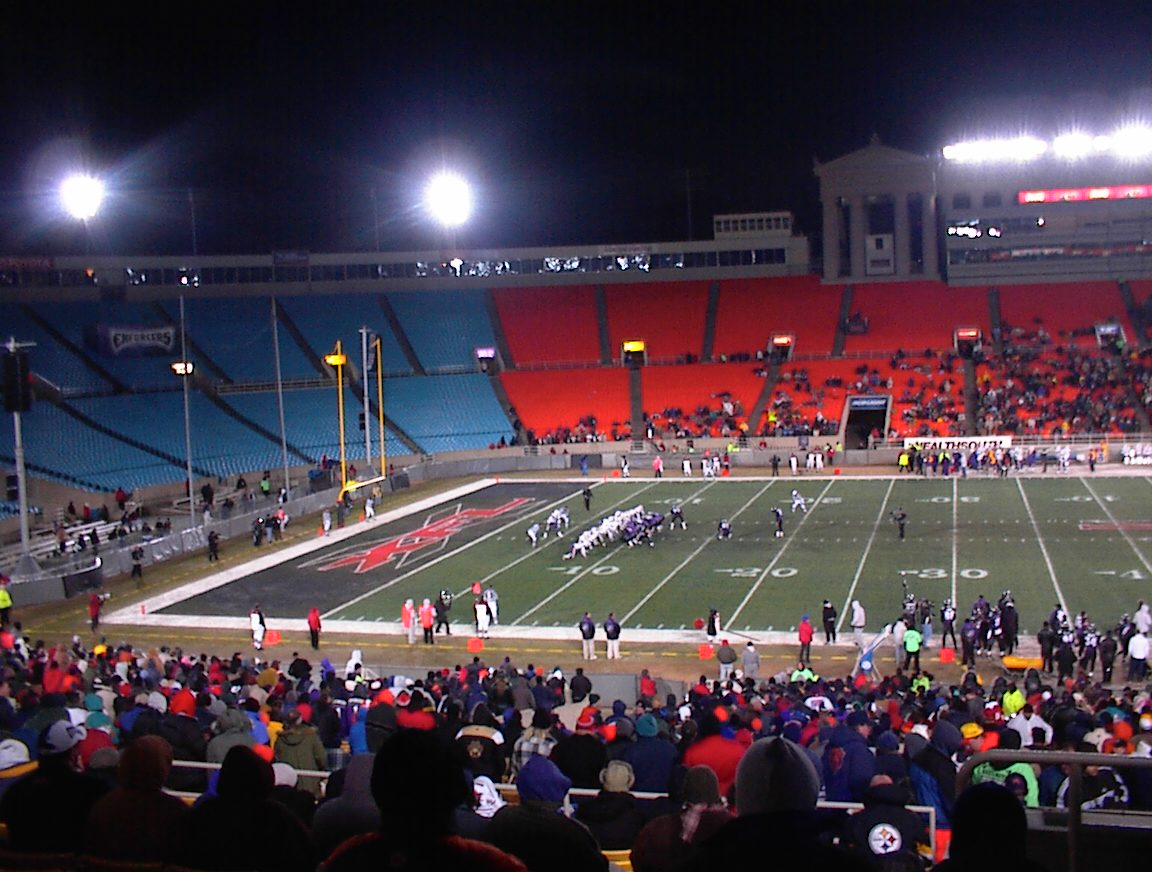
Enforcers game at Soldier Field, 2001. Empty stands were a regular feature at Enforcers games; at about 15,000 fans a game, the Enforcers had the lowest average attendance in the league.

The Enforcers got off to a slow start, losing their first four games with Tim Lester; at the time, Lester was working as a math teacher and assistant football coach at Wheaton Warrenville South High School in the suburbs of Chicago and played for the Enforcers effectively as a semi-professional player. In week 5, the team replaced Lester with the former Notre Dame Quatrerback Kevin McDougal, cut Lester, and brought in Craig Whelihan (an established NFL backup who had been third string on the Memphis Maniax at the time) to serve as McDougal's backup. The team went 5–1 in the rest of the season (winning their last four in a row), coming from behind to make the XFL playoffs at 2nd place in the Eastern Division. In addition to their potent rushing attack led by league leading running back John Avery, they were also known for their hard hitting defense. They lost to eventual XFL champion Los Angeles Xtreme in the crossover semifinals.

The Enforcers were part of the Eastern Division with the Orlando Rage, New York/New Jersey Hitmen and the Birmingham Thunderbolts. Their radio flagship station was WMVP, ESPN Radio 1000.

Poor attendance and the pending renovation of Soldier Field would have meant that, even if the league had continued, the Enforcers would have not; the league was exploring relocating the team to Milwaukee at the time of the league's closure.

== Season-by-season ==
Season records
Season	W	L	T	Finish	Playoff results
2001	5	5	0	2nd Eastern	Lost Semifinals (Los Angeles)
Totals	5	6	0	(including playoffs)	

=== Schedule ===
==== Regular season ====
Week	Date	Opponent	Result	Record	Venue	Attendance
1	February 3	at Orlando Rage	L 29–33	0–1	Florida Citrus Bowl	36,503
2	February 10	at Los Angeles Xtreme	L 32–39 (2 OT)	0–2	Los Angeles Memorial Coliseum	35,813
3	February 18	at Birmingham Thunderbolts	L 3–14	0–3	Legion Field	17,582
4	February 24	New York/New Jersey Hitmen	L 0–13	0–4	Soldier Field	24,052
5	March 4	Las Vegas Outlaws	W 15–13	1–4	Soldier Field	15,281
6	March 10	at Memphis Maniax	L 23–29	1–5	Liberty Bowl Memorial Stadium	17,434
7	March 18	San Francisco Demons	W 25–19	2–5	Soldier Field	11,428
8	March 25	Birmingham Thunderbolts	W 13–0	3–5	Soldier Field	10,593
9	March 31	at New York/New Jersey Hitmen	W 23–18	4–5	Giants Stadium	29,713
10	April 8	Orlando Rage	W 23–6	5–5	Soldier Field	17,195

==== Post-season ====
Round	Date	Opponent	Result	Record	Venue	Attendance
Semi-final	April 15	at Los Angeles Xtreme	L 16–33	0–1	Los Angeles Memorial Coliseum	13,081

== Standings ==
Eastern Division
Team	W	L	T	PCT	PF	PA	STK
Orlando Rage	8	2	0	.800	207	162	L1
Chicago Enforcers	5	5	0	.500	163	178	W1
New York/New Jersey Hitmen	4	6	0	.400	110	145	W1
Birmingham Thunderbolts	2	8	0	.200	131	217	L7

== Roster ==
2001 Chicago Enforcers roster
Quarterbacks (QB): 15 Kevin McDougal; Running backs (RB): 20 John Avery; 42 LeShon Johnson; 34 Charles Wiley; Wide receivers (WR): 83 Aaron Bailey; 18 Fred Coleman; 2 Luther Leverson; 88 Zechariah Lord; Tight ends (TE): 86 Tyji Armstrong; 89 Tim Martin; 85 William Tate	Offensive linemen (OL): 67 Bennie Anderson G; 75 Octavius Bishop T; 79 Bryan LaBelle G; 66 Rob Murphy G; 77 Chris Perez; 60 Tony Ramirez T; 76 Eric Schnupp G; 70 Derrick Turner G; Defensive linemen (DL): 54 Matt Finkes DE; 99 Larry Fitzpatrick DT; 50 Aaron Humphrey DE; 96 Sterling Palmer; 91 Hubert Thompson DE	Linebackers (LB): 53 Jaime Baisely ILB; 46 Chike Egbuniwe OLB; 55 Kivuusama Mays; 49 Carlos Timmons; Defensive backs (DB): 36 Ray Austin CB; 27 Jason Bray; 29 Quincy Coleman CB; 31 Kerry Cooks S; 24 Corey Ivy CB; 21 Troy Saunders CB; Special teams (ST): 4 Andy Crosland	Practice squad: 45 Dorian Brew CB; 77 Jason Chorak DE; 56 Casey Dailey LB; 74 Paul Janus G; 13 Tim Lester QB; 87 Roell Preston WR; -- Craig Whelihan QB; Reserve: 5 Paul Failla QB; -- Julian Pittman DT; -- Charles Ward DE; Rookies in italics, 7 practice squad

== Team leaders ==
Legend
Led the league

=== Passing ===
Passing statistics (Note: Crosland threw one incompletion)
NAME	GP	GS	Record	Cmp	Att	Pct	Yds	TD	Int	Rtg
Kevin McDougal	7	6	5–1	81	134	60.4	1,168	5	3	91.9
Tim Lester	4	4	0–4	40	77	51.9	581	4	5	67.1
Craig Whelihan	1	0	—	4	5	80.0	30	0	0	91.7
Paul Failla	2	0	—	1	5	20.0	5	0	0	39.6
Totals	10	10	5–5	126	222	56.8	1,784	9	8	81.4

=== Rushing ===
Rushing statistics
NAME	Att	Yds	Avg	Lng	TD
John Avery	150	800	5.3	73t	5
LeShon Johnson	72	287	4.0	41	6
Kevin McDougal	17	88	5.2	32	1
Tim Lester	13	32	2.5	8	1
Charles Wiley	10	25	2.5	8	2
Craig Whelihan	4	-2	-0.5	2	0
Aaron Bailey	2	43	21.5	40	0
Paul Failla	2	6	3.0	7	0
Luther Leverson	2	-14	-7.0	0	0
Totals	272	1,265	4.7	73t	15

=== Receiving ===
Receiving statistics
NAME	Rec	Yds	Avg	Lng	TD
Aaron Bailey	32	546	17.2	50	3
Junior Lord	20	301	15.0	46	0
John Avery	17	297	17.5	68t	2
Luther Leverson	14	248	17.7	56	2
William Tate	10	87	8.7	19t	2
Ryan Yarborough	8	59	7.4	14	0
Roell Preston	7	58	8.3	12	0
LeShon Johnson	7	33	4.7	16	0
Tyji Armstrong	6	49	8.2	19	0
Fred Coleman	5	106	21.2	33	0
Totals	126	1,784	14.2	68	9

=== Scoring ===
12-25 (48.0)% on extra point conversion attempts

Total scoring
NAME	Rush	Rec	Return	XPM	FGM	PTS
LeShon Johnson	6	0	0	8	0	44
John Avery	5	2	0	0	0	42
Andy Crosland	0	0	0	0	8	24
Aaron Bailey	0	3	0	0	0	18
William Tate	0	2	0	1	0	13
Charles Wiley	2	0	0	1	0	13
Luther Leverson	0	2	0	0	0	12
Tim Lester	1	0	0	1	0	7
Kevin McDougal	1	0	0	0	0	6
Brian Rogers	0	0	1	0	0	6
Tim Martin	0	0	0	1	0	1
Totals	15	9	1	12	8	186
