= LeShon Johnson =

American football player (born 1971)

No. 42, 32, 23
- Position: Running back

Personal information
- Born: January 15, 1971 (age 55); Haskell, Oklahoma, U.S.
- Listed height: 6 ft 0 in (1.83 m)
- Listed weight: 215 lb (98 kg)

Career information
- High school: Haskell
- College: Northern Illinois
- NFL draft: 1994: 3rd round, 84th overall pick

Career history
- Green Bay Packers (1994–1995); Arizona Cardinals (1995–1997); New York Giants (1998–1999); Chicago Enforcers (2001)

Awards and highlights
- Unanimous All-American (1993); Big West Offensive Player of the Year (1993); First-team All-Big West (1993)

Career NFL statistics
- Rushing yards: 955
- Rushing average: 3.8
- Receptions: 43
- Receiving yards: 434
- Return yards: 483
- Total touchdowns: 7
- Stats at Pro Football Reference

LeShon Eugene Johnson (born January 15, 1971) is an American former professional football player who was a running back and kick returner in the National Football League (NFL). He also played in the XFL.

Earlier in his career, Johnson played college football for the Northern Illinois Huskies. Johnson earned unanimous All-American honors in 1993.

In the 1994 NFL draft, Johnson was selected by the Green Bay Packers in the third round. He also played professionally for the Arizona Cardinals and New York Giants of the NFL and the Chicago Enforcers of the XFL. Johnson played professionally for seven total seasons.

In 2004, Johnson was arrested and pled guilty for crimes involving dog fighting ventures. Johnson continued his crimes involving dogs and dog fighting ventures until 2025, in which he was involved in the largest FBI raid on a dog fighting ring in history. 190 dogs were seized.

In a multi-day trial, the week of July 28th 2025, an Oklahoma federal jury convicted Leshon Eugene Johnson, of Broken Arrow, Oklahoma on six felony counts. The felonies included violating the federal Animal Welfare Act’s prohibitions against possessing, selling, transporting, and delivering animals to be used in dog fighting ventures.

== Early life ==
Johnson was born in Haskell, Oklahoma. He was a standout high school running back at Haskell High School. Johnson was a bull rider on the junior rodeo circuit, earning the nickname the "Cowboy," which followed him throughout his football career.

== College career ==
Johnson attended Northeastern Oklahoma A&M College, before transferring to Northern Illinois University as a junior. At Northern Illinois, he played for the Northern Illinois Huskies football team in 1992 and 1993. As a senior in 1993, Johnson was the leading college rusher with 1,976 yards on 327 carries for an average of 179.6 yards per game. Johnson finished sixth in the 1993 Heisman Trophy voting race, with five first-place votes. He played only two years for the Huskies, but his total yards mark of 3,314 still places him fifth on the team's all-time rushing list.

== Professional career ==
Pre-draft measurables
Height	Weight	Arm length	Hand span
5 ft 10 7/8 in (1.80 m)	206 lb (93 kg)	31 5/8 in (0.80 m)	8 1/2 in (0.22 m)

The Green Bay Packers selected Johnson in the third round (84th pick overall) of the 1994 NFL draft. He played for the Packers in 1994 and 1995. From 1995 to 1997, he was a member of the Arizona Cardinals. In Johnson's career-best game, he rushed for 214 yards on 21 carries for the Cardinals versus the New Orleans Saints on September 22, 1996. His career was interrupted by lymphoma cancer in 1998. He managed to make a comeback and subsequently started for the New York Giants in 1999. His football career ended playing in the XFL for the Chicago Enforcers.

== Criminal activity ==
Court documents show that Johnson ran a dog fighting operation in Broken Arrow and Haskell known as "Mal Kant Kennels." In 2004, he pled guilty to animal fighting charges for operating the "Krazyside Kennels." In 2005, he pled guilty to the crime of dog fighting in Hughes County, Oklahoma and received a five-year deferred sentence.

In March 2025, the United States Department of Justice charged Johnson with possession of 190 pit bull dogs used for "animal fighting venture and for selling, transporting, and delivering a dog for use in an animal fighting venture." Authorities said this is believed to be the largest number of dogs taken from a single person in a federal dog-fighting case. If convicted, Johnson is facing a maximum penalty of five years in prison, and a $250,000 fine on each count. Johnson was later convicted on all charges on August 5, 2025.

On September 10, 2026, Johnson was sentenced to 60 months for dog fighting and trafficking. He must also serve 3 years of post sentence supervision and pay a $30,000 fine.

== See also ==
- List of college football yearly rushing leaders
