= XFL (2001) =

Former American football league

- Sport: American football
- Founded: 1999
- Founder: Vince McMahon; Dick Ebersol
- First season: 2001
- Folded: 2001
- Owners: WWF (50%); NBC (50%)
- No. of teams: 8
- Country: United States
- Last champions: Los Angeles Xtreme (2001)
- Website: XFL.com

The XFL was a professional American football league that played its only season in 2001. The XFL was operated as a joint venture between the World Wrestling Federation (WWF, now WWE) and NBC. The XFL was conceived as an outdoor football league that would begin play immediately after the National Football League (NFL) season ended, to take advantage of the perceived lingering public desire to watch football after the NFL and college football seasons conclude. It was promoted as having fewer rules to encourage rougher play than other major leagues, while its telecasts featured sports entertainment elements inspired by professional wrestling (and in particular, the WWF's then-current "Attitude Era"), including heat and kayfabe, and suggestively-dressed cheerleaders. Commentary crews also featured WWF commentators (such as Jesse Ventura, Jim Ross, and Jerry Lawler) joined by sportscasters and veteran football players. Despite the wrestling influence, the games and their outcomes were legitimate and not based on scripted storylines.

The XFL operated as a single entity with all teams owned by the league, in contrast to most major professional leagues, which use a franchise model with individual owners. The league had eight teams in two divisions, and each franchise was based in a market that either currently had an NFL team (New York/New Jersey, Chicago, San Francisco); had previously supported other pro leagues like the United States Football League, the original World League or the Canadian Football League (Memphis, Orlando, Birmingham, Las Vegas); or was the largest market without a professional franchise (Los Angeles). Co-owner NBC served as the main carrier of XFL games, with UPN and TNN also carrying selected games.

The first night of play brought higher television viewership than NBC had projected, but ratings exponentially plummeted for subsequent games, with criticism directed toward its overall quality of play, on-air presentation and connection to the WWF, prompting NBC to pull out of the venture after one season. While plans were made to continue without NBC (with plans for expansion teams as well), UPN allegedly made inordinate demands of the league, which hastened its demise. The league ceased operations entirely in May 2001. Its closure was announced just a few weeks after the league's season championship game, in which the Los Angeles Xtreme defeated the San Francisco Demons, on April 21, 2001, at the Los Angeles Memorial Coliseum.

Despite its short-lived existence, the XFL pioneered several on-air technologies that would later become commonplace in football telecasts, such as aerial skycams, and on-player microphones. WWE owner Vince McMahon maintained control of the XFL brand after the league ceased operations, despite many, including McMahon himself, considering the original league to be a "colossal failure." Interest in the league was revived when ESPN Films released a 30 for 30 documentary surrounding the league, and shortly after the film debuted, McMahon began preparing for a new iteration of the league in 2020. The new XFL was run by a new McMahon-controlled company independent from the present-day WWE, and did not utilize the sports entertainment elements featured in the previous incarnation. The second iteration of the XFL's inaugural season was aborted due to the COVID-19 pandemic, and the league suspended operations and filed for bankruptcy in April 2020, with McMahon relinquishing the XFL brand in a sale to his former WWE wrestler, Dwayne Johnson and Dany Garcia that August.

== Founding ==
The idea to create a rival or supplemental league to the NFL first originated in 1998, when NBC had lost the broadcast rights to the NFL's American Football Conference (AFC) to CBS, ending a business relationship that had its origins with the AFC's predecessor, the American Football League (this having also come about after NBC had previously lost the rights to the pre-merger NFL, also to CBS). NBC was moving ahead with Ted Turner owned Time Warner to create a football league of their own, but it never came to fruition. Turner had previously attempted to rival the NFL when he collaborated with the NFLPA to create the Players' AII-Star Season during the 1982 players strike.

Created as a 50–50 joint venture between NBC and WWE-owned subsidiary WWE Properties International, Inc. under the company name "XFL, LLC", the XFL was created as a "single-entity league", instead of the franchise model used by the NFL and other major leagues, or hybrid model where investors in the league are given operations over teams (as used in Major League Soccer), the XFL uniformly owned and operated all of its teams as one corporation, with no individual owners. Vince McMahon's original plan was to purchase the Canadian Football League (after the CFL initially approached him about purchasing the Toronto Argonauts) and "have it migrate south," which was quickly rejected by the CFL.

The concept of the league was first announced on February 3, 2000. The XFL was originally conceived to build on the success of the NFL and professional wrestling. It combined the traditional game of American football with the kayfabe and stunts of professional wrestling. As WWF was, at the time, in the midst of its "Attitude Era" (which marked a shift in a mature and provocative direction for its content), the XFL's presentation likewise would reflect that approach toward football. It was hyped as "real" football without penalties for roughness and with fewer rules in general. Keen to avoid any perception that XFL games would somehow be predetermined in the sort of manner long established in professional wrestling, McMahon repeatedly emphasized that whereas the WWF was "100% (scripted) entertainment", the XFL would be "100% sport"; the winners of its games would be determined on the field. XFL games were to feature players and coaches with microphones and cameras in the huddle and locker rooms. Stadiums featured trash-talking public address announcers and scantily-clad cheerleaders who were encouraged to date the players. Instead of a pre-game coin toss, XFL officials put the ball on the ground and let a player from each team scramble for it to determine who received the kickoff option. The practice was dubbed "The Human Coin Toss" by commentators, and one player (Orlando Rage defensive back Hassan Shamsid-Deen) famously separated his shoulder on the first scramble, missing the rest of the season.

The XFL featured extensive television coverage, with three games televised each week on NBC, UPN, and TNN. To accommodate this, it placed four of its teams in the four largest U.S. media markets: New York City/North Jersey, Chicago, the San Francisco Bay Area, and Greater Los Angeles (this was during the NFL's 21-year absence from the Los Angeles metro area). The remaining four teams were placed in markets that had previously hosted teams in second-tier and/or rival major leagues: Birmingham, Memphis, Las Vegas, and Orlando. All of the XFL's markets except Las Vegas had hosted teams in the United States Football League in the 1980s; Las Vegas, along with Birmingham and Memphis, had hosted short-lived CFL teams in the 1990s.

The XFL chose unusual names for its teams, most of which either referenced images of uncontrolled insanity (Maniax, Rage, Xtreme, Demons) or criminal activity (Enforcers, Hitmen, Outlaws, and the Birmingham Blast). After outrage from Birmingham residents who noted that Birmingham had a history of notorious "blasts", including the 16th Street Baptist Church bombing in 1963 and Eric Rudolph's 1998 bombing of a local abortion clinic, the XFL changed the name of the Birmingham team to the more benign "Birmingham Thunderbolts" (later shortened to "Bolts").

Contrary to popular belief, the "X" in XFL did not stand for "extreme", as in "eXtreme Football League". When the league was first organized in 1999, it was originally supposed to stand for "Xtreme Football League"; however, there was already a league in formation at the same time with that name, and so promoters wanted to make sure that everyone knew that the "X" did not actually stand for anything (though McMahon would comment that "if the NFL stood for the 'No Fun League', the XFL will stand for the 'extra fun league'"). The other Xtreme Football League, which was also organized in 1999, merged with the Arena Football League's minor league AF2 before ever playing a single game. In a much later article describing the origins of the league's name, Sports Illustrated stated: "The F and the L act to indicate, if only indirectly, a football league. But the X is a variable. It could mean anything."

== Draft ==
The only main draft for the league took place over a three-day period from October 28 to 30, 2000. A total of 475 players were selected initially, with 65 additional players then selected in a supplemental draft on December 29, 2000.

== Teams ==
Eastern Division Western Division

Eastern Division

- Birmingham Thunderbolts
- Chicago Enforcers
- New York/New Jersey Hitmen
- Orlando Rage

Western Division

- Las Vegas Outlaws
- Los Angeles Xtreme
- Memphis Maniax
- San Francisco Demons

== 2001 season ==
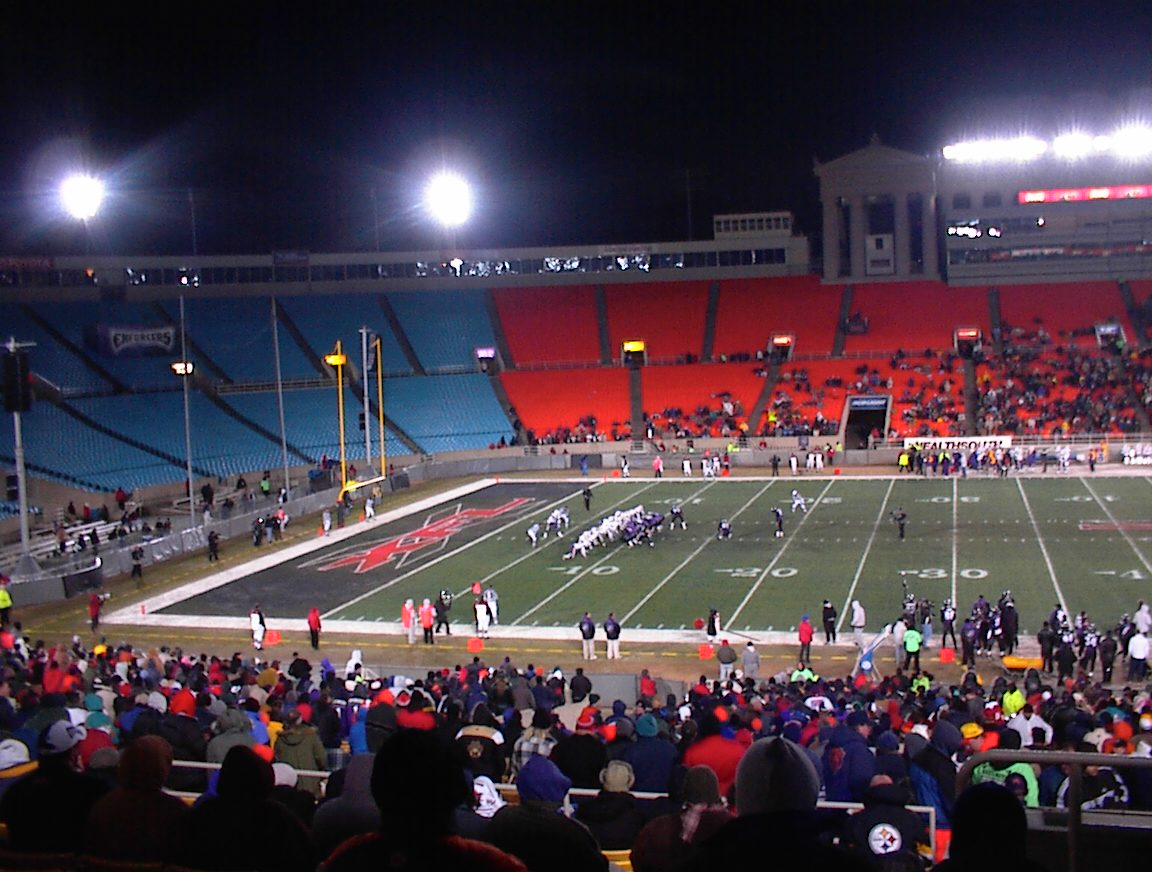
A Chicago Enforcers XFL game at Soldier Field

=== On the field ===
The XFL's opening game took place on February 3, 2001, one year after the league was announced, less than one week following the NFL's Super Bowl XXXV. The first game was between the New York/New Jersey Hitmen and Las Vegas Outlaws at Sam Boyd Stadium in Whitney, Nevada.

The league's regular season structure was set up so that each team played teams in its own division twice in the season, home and away (the same as the National Football League), and played against teams in the other division once. The season ran ten weeks, with no bye weeks.

The league's western division was far more competitive than the east, with the four teams' records ranging from 7–3 (for eventual champion Los Angeles) to 4–6 (Las Vegas, which finished last after losing its last three games to end up one game out of a playoff spot). In the East, New York and Chicago both were hampered by slow starts and ineffective starters before making personnel changes that improved their play, while Orlando, under quarterback Jeff Brohm, who owned the league's highest QB rating at 99.9 during the 2001 XFL season, soared to first place, winning its first six games before Brohm suffered a career-ending injury and the team regressed (the team went 2–2 in his absence). Birmingham started the season 2–1 before a rash of injuries (and tougher competition, as its two wins were against New York and Chicago) led to the team losing the last seven games. Injuries were a major problem across the league: only three of the league's eight Opening Day starting quarterbacks—Los Angeles's Tommy Maddox, San Francisco's Mike Pawlawski and Memphis's Jim Druckenmiller—were still starters by the end of the season. Birmingham and Las Vegas were both on their third-string quarterbacks by the end of the ten-week season.

The XFL postseason format was essentially identical to the one adopted by the AFL for its final season in 1969. The top two teams in each division qualified for the playoffs. To avoid teams having to play each other three times in a season prior to the championship game, the league set up the semifinal round of the playoffs so that the games would feature teams from opposite divisions: the east division champion (Orlando) hosted the west division runner-up (San Francisco), and likewise for the west champion and east runner-up (Los Angeles and Chicago, respectively). Los Angeles and San Francisco each won their playoff games to advance to the XFL championship.

=== Off the field ===
The opening game ended with a 19–0 victory for the Outlaws, and was watched on NBC by an estimated 14 million viewers. During the telecast, NBC switched over to the game between the Orlando Rage and the Chicago Enforcers, which was a closer contest than the blowout taking place in Las Vegas. The opening night drew a 9.5 Nielsen rating.

The opening-week games actually delivered ratings double those of what NBC had promised advertisers (and more viewers than the 2001 Pro Bowl). The audience declined to a 4.6 in week 2, still an acceptable rating for NBC, but further ratings declines eventually led to the network abandoning the league after the season.

A further problem was that the XFL itself was the brainchild of Vince McMahon, a man who was ridiculed by mainstream sports journalists due to the stigma attached to professional wrestling as being "fake"; many journalists even jokingly speculated whether any of the league's games were rigged, although nothing of this sort was ever seriously investigated.

Ebersol was disappointed with the opening game's poor quality of play. Even longtime NBC sportscaster Bob Costas joined in the mocking of the league. Ebersol purposely allowed Costas and other NBC Sports veterans to opt out of the network's coverage of the league (hence, with the exception of former NFL on NBC analyst Mike Adamle, its coverage was helmed mostly by younger unknowns and professional wrestling figures), and Costas in particular did not like McMahon's approach to the sport. In an appearance on Late Night with Conan O'Brien in February 2001, after the league's second week of play, Costas joked: "It has to be at least a decade since I first mused out loud, 'Why doesn't somebody combine mediocre high school football with a tawdry strip club?' Finally, somebody takes my idea and runs with it." Costas interviewed a defiant McMahon for an episode of his HBO show On the Record as the league was in decline, an interview that the 2017 documentary This Was the XFL portrayed as being an omen of the league's collapse.

=== 2001 schedule ===
2001 XFL schedule
Home	Away	Week 1	Week 2	Week 3	Week 4	Week 5	Week 6	Week 7	Week 8	Week 9	Week 10
Win	Loss	Week 1	Week 2	Week 3	Week 4	Week 5	Week 6	Week 7	Week 8	Week 9	Week 10
Eastern Division
Birmingham Thunderbolts (2–8)		MEM	NY	CHI	ORL	SF	LA	LV	CHI	ORL	NY
Birmingham Thunderbolts (2–8)		20–22	19–12	14–3	6–30	10–39	26–35	12–34	0–13	24–29	0–22
Chicago Enforcers (5–5)		ORL	LA	BIR	NY	LV	MEM	SF	BIR	NY	ORL
Chicago Enforcers (5–5)		29–33	30–32 (2OT)	3–14	0–13	15–13	23–29	25–19	13–0	23–18	23–6
New York/New Jersey Hitmen (4–6)		LV	BIR	ORL	CHI	LA	SF	MEM	ORL	CHI	BIR
New York/New Jersey Hitmen (4–6)		0–19	12–19	12–18	13–0	7–22	20–12	16–15	12–17	18–23	22–0
Orlando Rage (8–2)		CHI	SF	NY	BIR	MEM	LV	LA	NY	BIR	CHI
Orlando Rage (8–2)		33–29	26–14	18–12	30–6	21–19	27–15	6–31	17–12	29–24	6–23
Western Division
Las Vegas Outlaws (4–6)		NY	MEM	LA	SF	CHI	ORL	BIR	LA	SF	MEM
Las Vegas Outlaws (4–6)		19–0	25–3	9–12	16–9	13–15	15–27	34–12	26–35	9–14	3–16
Los Angeles Xtreme (7–3)		SF	CHI	LV	MEM	NY	BIR	ORL	LV	MEM	SF
Los Angeles Xtreme (7–3)		13–15	32–30 (2OT)	12–9	12–18	22–7	35–26	31–6	35–26	12–27	24–0
Memphis Maniax (5–5)		BIR	LV	SF	LA	ORL	CHI	NY	SF	LA	LV
Memphis Maniax (5–5)		22–20	3–25	6–13	18–12	19–21	29–23	15–16	12–21	27–12	16–3
San Francisco Demons (5–5)		LA	ORL	MEM	LV	BIR	NY	CHI	MEM	LV	LA
San Francisco Demons (5–5)		15–13	14–26	13–6	9–16	39–10	12–20	19–25	21–12	14–9	0–24

=== 2001 standings ===
Regular season

Eastern Division
Team	Won	Lost	Pct.	GB
y-Orlando Rage	8	2	.800	–
x-Chicago Enforcers	5	5	.500	3
New York/New Jersey Hitmen	4	6	.400	4
Birmingham Thunderbolts	2	8	.200	6
Western Division
Team	Won	Lost	Pct.	GB
y-Los Angeles Xtreme	7	3	.700	–
x-San Francisco Demons	5	5	.500	2
Memphis Maniax	5	5	.500	2
Las Vegas Outlaws	4	6	.400	3

Playoffs

Semifinals
April 14 – Citrus Bowl, Orlando
W2	San Francisco	26
E1	Orlando	25
April 15 – Memorial Coliseum, LA
E2	Chicago	16
W1	Los Angeles	33

Million Dollar Game
April 21 – Memorial Coliseum, LA
W2	San Francisco	6
W1	Los Angeles	38

=== Statistical leaders ===
- Rushing Attempts: 153 James Bostic (Birmingham Thunderbolts)
- Rushing Yards: 800 John Avery (Chicago Enforcers)
- Rushing Touchdowns: 7 Derrick Clark (Orlando Rage)
- Receptions: 67 Jeremaine Copeland (Los Angeles Xtreme)
- Receiving Yards: 828 Stepfret Williams (Birmingham Thunderbolts)
- Receiving Touchdowns: 8 Darnell McDonald (Los Angeles Xtreme)
- Passing Attempts: 342 Tommy Maddox (Los Angeles Xtreme)
- Passing Completions: 196 Tommy Maddox (Los Angeles Xtreme)
- Passing Yards: 2,186 Tommy Maddox (Los Angeles Xtreme)
- Passing Touchdowns: 18 Tommy Maddox (Los Angeles Xtreme)
- Passing Interceptions: 10 Brian Kuklick (Orlando Rage)
- Interceptions: 5 Corey Ivy (Chicago Enforcers)
- Quarterback Sacks: 7 Antonio Edwards and Kelvin Kinney (both Las Vegas Outlaws)

=== Statistics ===
Attendances
Team	Stadium	Capacity	Avg. Att.	Avg.% Filled
San Francisco Demons	Pacific Bell Park	41,059	35,005	85%
New York/New Jersey Hitmen	Giants Stadium	80,242	28,309	35%
Orlando Rage	Citrus Bowl	36,000^{A}	25,563	71%
Los Angeles Xtreme	Los Angeles Memorial Coliseum	92,000	22,679	25%
Las Vegas Outlaws	Sam Boyd Stadium	36,800	22,618	61%
Memphis Maniax	Liberty Bowl Memorial Stadium	62,921	20,396	32%
Birmingham Thunderbolts	Legion Field	83,091	17,002	20%
Chicago Enforcers	Soldier Field	55,701	15,710	28%

^{A} The Citrus Bowl, which had a total capacity of 65,438 at the time, had its upper decks closed off for XFL games.

Passing leaders (over 100 pass attempts)
Name	Team	Att	Comp	%	Yards	YDs/Att	TD	TD %	INT	INT %	Long	Sacked	Yds lost	Rating
Tommy Maddox	LA	342	196	57.3	2186	6.39	18	5.3	9	2.6	63	14	91	81.2
Mike Pawlawski	SF	297	186	62.6	1659	5.59	12	4	6	2	35	16	141	82.6
Jim Druckenmiller	MEM	199	109	54.8	1499	7.53	13	6.5	7	3.5	49	15	89	86.2
Casey Weldon	BIRM	164	102	62.2	1228	7.49	7	4.3	5	3	80 (TD)	7	44	86.6
Kevin McDougal	CHI	134	81	60.4	1168	8.72	5	3.7	3	2.2	56	8	69	91.9
Brian Kuklick	ORL	122	68	55.7	994	8.15	6	4.9	10	8.2	81 (TD)	7	42	64.7
Jeff Brohm	ORL	119	69	58.0	993	8.34	9	7.6	3	2.5	51 (TD)	11	78	99.9
Wally Richardson	NY/NJ	142	83	58.5	812	5.72	6	4.2	6	4.2	33 (TD)	17	107	71.1
Ryan Clement	LV	138	78	56.5	805	5.83	9	6.5	4	2.9	46	10	59	83.2

Passing leaders (under 100 pass attempts)
Name	Team	Att	Comp	%	Yards	YDs/Att	TD	TD %	INT	INT %	Long	Sacked	Yds lost	Rating
Tim Lester	CHI	77	40	51.9	581	7.55	4	5.2	5	6.5	68 (TD)	13	68	67.1
Graham Leigh	BIRM	97	44	45.4	499	5.14	1	1	6	6.2	36	8	62	39.0
Marcus Crandell	MEM	69	33	47.8	473	6.86	1	1.4	2	2.9	53	9	62	63.3
Jay Barker	BIRM	65	37	56.9	425	6.54	1	1.5	5	7.7	92 (TD)	10	64	49.8
Charles Puleri	NY/NJ	64	29	45.3	411	6.42	2	3.1	2	3.1	77 (TD)	4	39	64.0
Mark Grieb	LV	78	37	47.4	408	5.23	3	3.8	4	5.1	41 (TD)	5	44	54.9
Pat Barnes	SF	80	36	45.0	379	4.74	3	3.8	2	2.5	34	5	38	61.4
Corte McGuffey	NY/NJ	48	25	52.1	329	6.85	0	0	2	4.2	54	5	38	56.7
Mike Cawley	LV	38	17	44.7	180	4.74	1	2.6	2	5.3	26	10	83	45.9
Scott Milanovich	LA	9	2	22.2	45	5	0	0	1	11.1	39	0	0	8.3
Craig Whelihan	CHI/MEM	5	4	80.0	30	6	0	0	0	0	12	0	0	91.7
Paul Failla	CHI	5	1	20.0	5	1	0	0	0	0	5	2	12	39.6

Rushing leaders
Name	Team	Att	Yds	Ave.	Long	TDs
John Avery	CHI	150	800	5.3	73 (TD)	5
Rod Smart	LV	146	555	3.8	31	3
James Bostic	BIRM	153	536	3.5	56	2
Rashaan Salaam	MEM	114	528	4.6	39 (TD)	5
Derrick Clark	ORL	94	395	4.2	19	7
Saladin McCullough	LA	88	384	4.4	22	5
Joe Aska	NY/NJ	82	329	4.0	42	3
Micheal Black	ORL	83	320	3.9	20	0
LeShon Johnson	CHI	72	287	4.0	41	6
Rashaan Shehee	LA	61	242	4.0	28	0
Kelvin Anderson	SF	53	231	4.4	39	1
Jim Druckenmiller	MEM	31	208	6.7	36	0
Juan Johnson	SF	33	172	5.2	19	0
Wally Richardson	NY/NJ	26	148	5.7	24	0

Receiving yardage leaders (over 175 yards)
Name	Team	Rec	Yds	Ave.	Long	TDs
Stepfret Williams	BIRM	51	828	16.2	92 (TD)	2
Charles Jordan	MEM	45	823	18.3	49	4
Jeremaine Copeland	LA	67	755	11.3	34	5
Dialleo Burks	ORL	34	659	19.4	81 (TD)	7
Aaron Bailey	CHI	32	546	17.1	50	3
Quincy Jackson	BIRM	45	531	11.8	36 (TD)	6
Darnell McDonald	LA	34	456	13.4	39	8
Daryl Hobbs	MEM	30	419	14	49 (TD)	5
Jimmy Cunningham	SF	50	408	8.2	26	3
Kirby Dar Dar	NY/NJ	22	405	18.4	77 (TD)	2
Kevin Swayne	ORL	27	400	14.8	51 (TD)	2
Brian Roberson	SF	36	395	11	35	2
Kevin Prentiss	MEM	25	383	15.3	53	0
Mario Bailey	ORL	27	379	14	49 (TD)	3
Zola Davis	NY/NJ	29	378	13	26	4
James Hundon	SF	28	357	12.8	34	0
Zechariah Lord	CHI	20	301	15.1	46	0
John Avery	CHI	17	297	17.5	68 (TD)	2
Yo Murphy	LV	27	273	10.1	35	3
Anthony DiCosmo	NY/NJ	26	268	10.3	30	0
Latario Rachal	LA	24	254	10.6	24	0
Rod Smart	LV	27	245	9.1	46	0
Mike Furrey	LV	18	242	13.4	41 (TD)	1
Ed Smith	BIRM	25	195	7.8	16	1

== Rule differences ==
Despite boasts of a "rules-light" game, and universally negative reviews from the mainstream sports media early on, the XFL played the standard brand of 11-man American outdoor football that was recognizable, aside from the opening game sprint to determine possession, and some other changes, some of which were modified during the season as it progressed. The league's coaches vetoed a proposal to eliminate ineligible receivers (allowing any player to receive a forward pass) midway through the season, thinking that particular change would be too radical.

=== Game balls ===
The league's game balls were made by Spalding, and were unique in that instead of being the standard brown, the ball was black, with a red "X" going across the sides of the ball. The balls were later found to be slippery and difficult to handle, and the balls had to be rubbed with sandpaper to make them usable.

=== Grass stadiums ===
The league deliberately avoided placing teams in stadiums with artificial turf, which at the time had a bad reputation both for being unsightly, as well as being more hazardous to play on compared to natural turf. The league's requirement for grass fields automatically ruled out the use of domed stadiums since no such stadium capable of accommodating a grass football field existed in the U.S. in 2001 (the only retractable roof stadiums complete at the time were used exclusively for Major League Baseball; the first retractable roof stadium for NFL use was not completed until Reliant Stadium opened for the expansion Houston Texans in 2002). Furthermore, every XFL field was designed identically, with no individual team branding on the field. Each end zone and 50 yard line was decorated with the XFL logo, with the endzones also being painted black.

Most of the league's stadiums were football-specific facilities, the only exception being San Francisco's Pacific Bell Park (home of the San Francisco Giants) which was built primarily for baseball, but (unlike many newer baseball-specific stadiums) can accommodate football. Two XFL stadiums (Giants Stadium and Soldier Field) were also then-current NFL stadiums, while two others (Los Angeles Memorial Coliseum and the Liberty Bowl Memorial Stadium) had previously hosted NFL games; the NFL would return to the Coliseum when the Rams returned to Los Angeles in 2016. The remaining fields were in regular use as college football venues at the time.

The home team in every stadium was required to occupy the sideline opposite the press box in order to be visible to the television cameras. Due to the odd field dimensions in San Francisco, teams playing there were permitted to occupy the same sideline (a similar arrangement existed in the NFL when the Green Bay Packers played home games at Milwaukee County Stadium and stadiums previously used by the Chicago Bears, Detroit Lions, Kansas City Chiefs and Minnesota Vikings).

The all-grass field stipulation caused the league to skip over several of the country's largest markets, including Houston and Philadelphia, since they lacked large grass stadiums in 2001. In the league's two northernmost markets, Chicago and New York/New Jersey (the latter of which played in Giants Stadium during a brief window in which the stadium's usual artificial turf had been replaced by natural grass), the combination of the all-grass requirement, midwinter playing season, and fact that the XFL followed shortly after the NFL had used both fields for a full season (in Giants Stadium's case, two full seasons, since the Giants and Jets shared the stadium; the Giants also hosted two playoff games following the 2000 season) caused significant damage to the playing fields; at Chicago's Soldier Field, the wear and tear on the field was such that by midseason, the midfield logo of the NFL's Chicago Bears was clearly visible amid a stretch of dirt and dead grass.

At the time, "next generation" artificial surfaces (which much more closely mimicked grass in appearance, feel and player safety) were slowly being introduced in professional football. In 2000, the Seattle Seahawks were the first professional team to play on next-generation artificial turf at the University of Washington's Husky Stadium, where the Seahawks played in 2000 and 2001 following the demolition of the Kingdome, and prior to the completion of what is now Lumen Field). Giants Stadium would have a next generation artificial surface installed in 2003; Soldier Field was renovated extensively in 2002, but retained its grass field. Liberty Bowl Memorial Stadium and Legion Field have also installed next-generation turf fields since the demise of the original XFL.

=== Opening scramble ===
Replacing the coin toss at the beginning of each game was an event in which one player from each team fought to recover a football 20 yards away in order to determine possession. Both players lined up side by side on one of the 30-yard lines, with the ball being placed at the 50-yard line. At the whistle, the two players would run toward the ball and attempt to gain possession; whichever player gained possession first was allowed to choose possession (as if he had won a coin toss in other leagues). Each player was permitted one false start; if either player committed a second false start his team would automatically forfeit the choice of possession. The XFL's first injury resulted from the opening scramble; Orlando free safety Hassan Shamsid-Deen suffered a separated shoulder prior to the Rage's 33–29 season-opening win over the Chicago Enforcers at Florida Citrus Bowl Stadium on February 3. He ended up missing the remainder of the campaign.

=== No PAT (Point After Touchdown) kicks ===
After every touchdown scored, no extra point after kicks were done, due to the XFL's perception that an extra-point kick was a "guaranteed point." To earn a point after a touchdown, teams ran a single offensive down from the two-yard line (functionally identical to the NFL / NCAA / CFL two-point conversion, but for just a single point, as it had been before the two-point conversion was adopted). By the playoffs, two-point and three-point conversions had been added to the rules. Teams could opt for the bonus points by playing the conversion farther back from the goal line. However, touchdowns were still worth 6 points.

This rule, as originally implemented, was similar to the WFL's "Action Point", and was identical to a 1968 "Pressure Point" experiment by the NFL and American Football League, used only in preseason interleague games that year.

In 2015, the NFL, CFL, and other professional leagues would address the "guaranteed point" concerns by moving the extra point kick back to the 15-yard and 25-yard lines, respectively, thus making the length of the kick the same distance (taking into account the NFL's position of the goalposts on the end line, and the CFL's goalposts being positioned on the goal line). The Alliance of American Football (AAF) in 2019 adopted the "no extra point kick" rule from the original XFL, albeit making the scrimmage play conversion two points as in other levels of the game. The revived XFL kept the conversion system used during the playoffs.

=== Overtime ===
Ties were to be resolved in similar fashion to the NCAA and CFL today, with at least one possession by each team, starting from the opponent's 20-yard line. There were differences: there were no first downs, and thus, teams had to score within four downs, and the team that had possession first in overtime could not attempt a field goal until fourth down. If that team managed to score a touchdown in fewer than four downs, the second team would only have that same number of downs to match or beat the result. If the score was still tied after one overtime period, the team that played second on offense in the first OT would start on offense in the second OT (similar to the rules of college football overtime). The process would be repeated until a winner was determined; unlike the CFL and NFL, but like college football, games could not end in ties, even in the regular season.

=== Bump and run ===
The XFL allowed full bump and run coverage early in the season. Defensive backs were allowed to hit wide receivers any time before the quarterback released the ball, as long as the hit came from the front or side.

Following the fourth week of the season, bump and run was restricted to the first five yards from the line of scrimmage (similar to NFL and CFL) in an effort to increase offensive production.

=== Forward motion ===
Unlike the NFL, but like the World Football League and Arena Football League before it, the XFL allowed one offensive player to move toward the line of scrimmage once he was outside the tackles.

=== Punting ===
The XFL imposed a number of restrictions on punting that are not present in most other leagues' rules, the net effect of which made punts in the XFL operate under rules more akin to kickoffs. The purpose of these provisions was to keep play going after the ball was punted, encouraging the kicking team to make the ball playable and the receiving team to run it back. To this effect:

- Punting out of bounds was a ten-yard penalty, effectively outlawing the coffin corner punt commonplace at most other levels of the game.
- Any punt that traveled at least 25 yards past the line of scrimmage could be recovered by the kicking team, thus legalizing to an extent the up-and-under or garryowen common to rugby football codes. Thus, instead of letting the kicking team down the ball as is common in other leagues, the receiving team was required to try to return the punt or else lose possession.
- The kicking team was prohibited from coming within five yards of the punt returner before he gained possession of the ball. This rule, known as the "halo rule" in college football, and also common in the CFL, was dubbed the "danger zone" in the XFL. Coming within 5 yards or less of the "danger zone" entailed a 5-yard penalty, much in the same vein as the CFL's "no yards" penalty.
- Fair catches were not recognized. (The "no fair catch" rule was one of the most heavily hyped rule differences in the XFL, and a central part of the league's marketing campaign, and like the above "no yards" penalty, fair catches were not recognized in Canadian football.)

For the initial weeks of the season, the XFL forbade all players on the kicking team from going downfield before a kick was made from scrimmage on that down, similarly to a rule the NFL considered in 1974. For the rest of the season, the XFL modified it to allow one player closest to each sideline downfield ahead of the kick, the same modification the NFL adopted to their change just before their 1974 exhibition games started.

Allowing the kicking team to recover a punt did encourage noticeably more quick kicks over the course of the XFL's lone season than was typically seen in the NFL over the preceding decades, including a quick kick during the Million Dollar Game (that particular kick, executed by San Francisco on a third-and-31 play, succeeded in taking Los Angeles off-guard, but the kick also backfired as the Demons could not recover the kick and Los Angeles returned it for a touchdown).

=== Play clock ===
The XFL used a play clock of 35 seconds from the end of the previous play, five seconds shorter than the contemporary NFL play clock of 40 seconds (but still longer than the CFL's 20 seconds, timed from the spotting of the football), in an effort to speed up the game.

=== Roster and salaries ===
The XFL limited each team to an unusually low 38 players, as opposed to 53 on NFL teams, and 80 or more on unlimited college rosters. This was similar to the CFL, which had a comparable 40 man roster limit in 2001. This was partly to limit payroll costs, and partly because the XFL wanted to curb the use of "specialists," something which the NFL has sometimes come under criticism for. To comply with roster limits, most teams only carried two quarterbacks, and one kicker, who doubled as the punter.

The XFL paid standardized player salaries. Quarterbacks earned US$5,000 per week, kickers earned $3,500, and all other uniformed players earned $4,500 per week, though a few players got around these restrictions (Los Angeles Xtreme players Noel Prefontaine, the league's lone punting specialist, and Matt Malloy, a wide receiver) by having themselves listed as backup quarterbacks. Players on a winning team received a bonus of $2,500 for the week, $7,500 for winning a playoff game. The team that won the championship game split $1,000,000 (roughly $25,000 per player). Players did not receive any fringe benefits, and had to pay for their own health insurance.

=== Jersey nicknames ===
The XFL allowed its players to wear a nickname on the back of their jersey, as opposed to the legal last name most professional sports leagues have required since the 1960s. Players could change the nickname any time they wanted, and a few players chose to change their nicknames on a weekly basis depending on their opponent. The league's use of backfield camera angles gave these nicknames even greater exposure. Nevertheless, two teams, Orlando and Birmingham, imposed policies that forbade players from using nicknames. Orlando's ban was voted upon by the players, although Jeff Brohm objected. Birmingham's players were banned from doing so by coach Gerry DiNardo, a notoriously strict disciplinarian more accustomed to coaching at the college level. DiNardo previously alienated players at Vanderbilt and LSU and later did so at Indiana with his iron-fisted rule. The Thunderbolts were the only professional team he would ever coach.

Rod Smart, a running back who played in the first XFL nationally televised game, was the first player to gain notice from his nickname, "He Hate Me."

== Broadcast overview ==
=== Camera perspectives ===
Although the XFL was not the first football league to feature the "sky cam", which enables TV viewers to see behind the offensive unit, it helped to popularize its unique capabilities. For the first several weeks, the league used the sky cam and on-field cameramen (nicknamed the "Bubba Cam" after WWE's cameraman, Bubba, who couldn't get medical clearance to cover the XFL) extensively, giving the television broadcasts a perspective similar to video games such as the Madden series.

During player interviews, particularly later in the season as attendances declined, the television crews took extensive efforts to avoid capturing the empty stands on camera. When they did show the stands, it was just mostly close ups of individual sections that were full. Player interviews at sparsely-attended games were often shot from a camera angle in close proximity and low to the ground pointed upward, giving the perspective of the camera being operated by a little person.

After the XFL's failure, the sky cam was adopted by the NFL's broadcasters; the device has subsequently come into use on all major networks. NBC in particular switched back to the XFL camera angles in 2017, when traditional cameras were too far away to cut through thick fog and smoke on some of the Sunday Night Football games that year; response was so positive that the network opted to use two of its Thursday Night Football games to experiment with intentionally broadcasting most of the game from that angle.

=== Broadcast schedule ===
At the beginning of the season, NBC showed a feature game at 8 p.m. Eastern Time on Saturday nights, also taping a second game. The second game, in some weeks, would air in the visiting team's home market (as was the case in week 6 for the Enforcers-Maniax game, and in week 7, for the Maniax-Hitmen game), and be put on the air nationally if the feature game was a blowout (as was the case in week one), or encountered technical difficulties (as was the case in week two). Two games were shown each Sunday: one at 4 p.m. Eastern on TNN, and another at 7 p.m. Eastern on UPN. The XFL also had a fairly extensive local radio presence, often using nationally recognized disc jockeys. The morning radio duo of Rick and Bubba, for instance, was the radio broadcast team for the Birmingham Thunderbolts. Super Dave Osborne was a sideline reporter for Los Angeles Xtreme broadcasts on KLSX; WMVP carried Chicago Enforcers games.

Unusually for a professional league, the XFL did not feature a studio wraparound. The network offered XFL Gameday, a pregame show featuring radio shock jocks Opie and Anthony for the first four weeks of the season, but the show was not carried nationwide, and most affiliates joined in just before the game. Halftime consisted mostly of live look-ins into the player locker rooms, as coaches discussed their strategy and halftime adjustments with their players, as well as cheerleader performances. The XFL also, at McMahon's request, followed a somewhat different format than traditional professional football telecasts: The announcers more closely followed the model of professional wrestling, wherein the color commentator had a villain-like role, while the sideline reporters (who were predominantly male, a rare example of the XFL being more conservative than the NFL at the time, which was incorporating attractive female sideline reporters) were former players and experienced sportscasters who were more relied upon for expert analysis.

In the third week of the season, the games were sped up through changes in the playing rules, and broadcasts were subjected to increased time constraints. The reason was the reaction of Lorne Michaels, creator and executive producer of Saturday Night Live, to the length of the Los Angeles Xtreme versus Chicago Enforcers game that went into double overtime. The double overtime periods combined with a power outage earlier in the game, due to someone not fueling a generator before the game delaying the contest, causing the start of Saturday Night Live to be pushed back from 11:30 p.m. Eastern Time to 12:15 a.m. Sunday morning. This angered Michaels, who expected high ratings with Jennifer Lopez as the show's host. For the rest of the season, the XFL cut off coverage at 11:00 Eastern Time, regardless of whether or not the game was over (there were exceptions, for the Chicago and Memphis markets for the Enforcers-Maniax game in week 6, and the New York and Memphis markets for the Maniax-Hitmen game in week 7). NBC Sports has retained this policy for other sports it runs in Saturday night time slots since the XFL's closure; in 2018, a National Hockey League telecast was cut off under similar circumstances.

In the face of declining ratings, NBC and the XFL aggressively promoted that the week 6 game between the Orlando Rage and Las Vegas Outlaws would feature a behind-the-scenes visit into the locker room of the Rage's cheerleaders at halftime. The heavily promoted event was actually a pre-recorded sketch with McMahon and a cameraman, who knocks himself unconscious on the locker room door trying to run in. This was followed by a suggestive dream sequence with the cheerleaders, including a surprise cameo by Rodney Dangerfield. The New York Daily News reported that the scene would likely be the "[last] salacious WWF-style stunt for the rest of the season", citing internal sources indicating that NBC wished to pivot the telecasts back toward a football-oriented product, including hiring NFL alumni as analysts, and reinstating Vasgersian as the lead commentator.

=== Broadcast teams ===
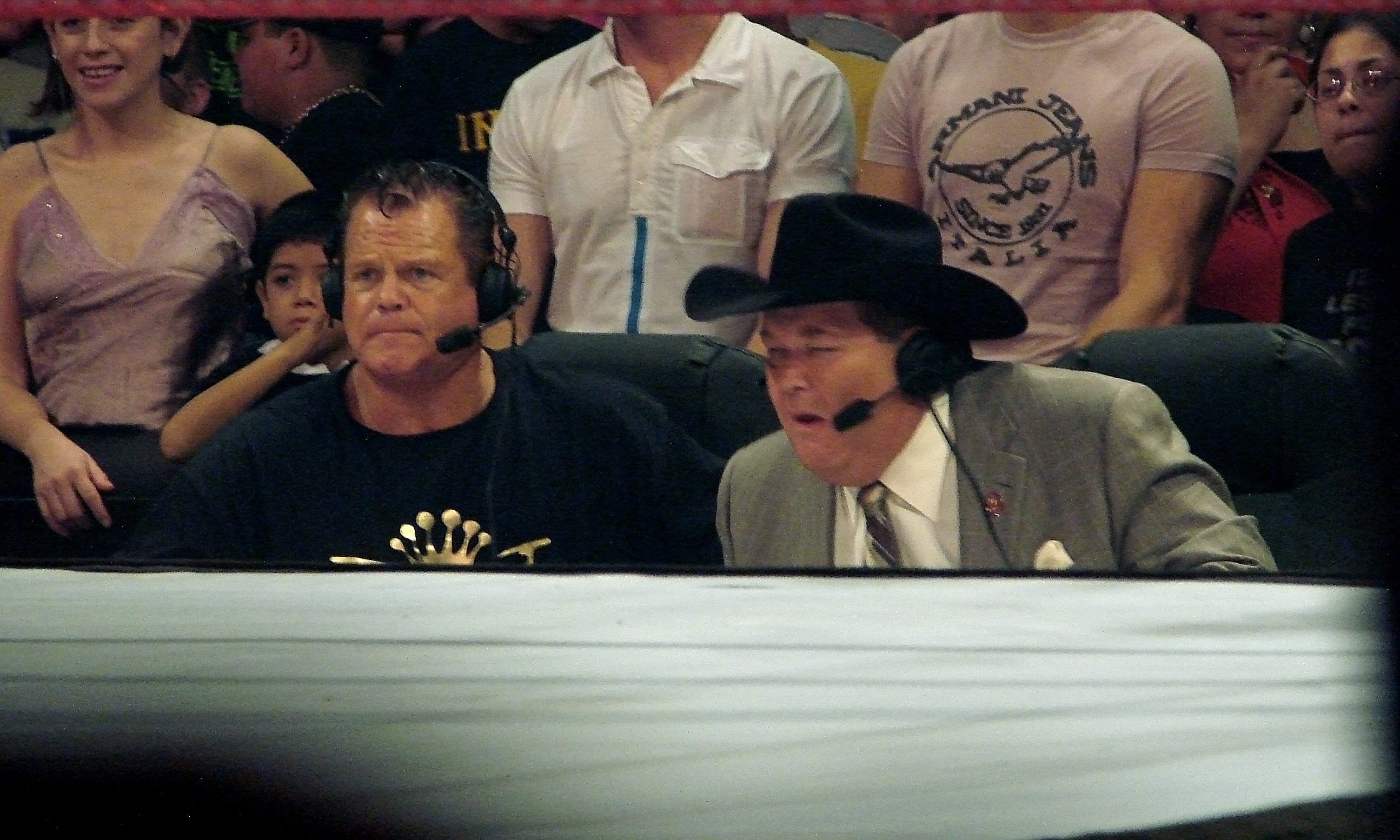
Jerry Lawler and Jim Ross came over from WWF to fill similar roles on XFL broadcasts.

- NBC (national telecasts):
  - Week 1, Matt Vasgersian, Jesse Ventura, Fred Roggin and Mike Adamle.
  - Week 2–5: Jim Ross, Ventura, Roggin and Adamle
  - Week 6–10: Vasgersian, Ventura, Adamle, Roggin and Chris Wragge. Adamle moved from the sidelines to the booth with Vasgerian and Ventura, while Wragge was moved over from the UPN broadcast team.
- NBC (regional telecasts):
  - Week 1: Ross, Jerry Lawler, Jonathan Coachman. For week 1, Ross and Lawler were billed as their WWF personas, "J.R." and "The King."
  - Week 2–5: Vasgersian, Lawler, and Coachman. McMahon personally demoted Vasgersian to the regional telecast after openly criticizing a suggestive shot of the cheerleaders as "uncomfortable" on-air during the week 1 broadcast.
  - Week 6–10: Ross, Dick Butkus or Dan Hampton, and Coachman. Lawler left the XFL (and WWF) in protest after week five in the aftermath of the firing of his then-wife, Stacy Carter, as well as his own dissatisfaction with being pressured into commentary on XFL games; Lawler openly admitted on-air that he had virtually no interest or background in football, an unusual trait for a color analyst. After Lawler's departure, NBC brought Vasgersian back up to the main broadcast team. Hampton and Butkus rotated as the regional color analyst for the rest of the season.
- TNN: Craig Minervini, Bob Golic, Lee Reherman and Kip Lewis.
- UPN: Chris Marlowe, Brian Bosworth, Chris Wragge and Michael Barkann.

== Critical reception ==
It was believed that the willingness of Las Vegas bookmakers to take bets on XFL games established their legitimacy, dispelling concerns that the league was using predetermined storylines as in professional wrestling. However, the league was panned by critics as boring football with a tawdry broadcast style, although the broadcasts on TNN, and to a lesser extent, UPN, and the Matt Vasgersian–helmed NBC coverage were considered comparatively professional.

== End of season and failure ==
On April 21, 2001, the season concluded as the Los Angeles Xtreme defeated the San Francisco Demons 38–6 in the XFL Championship Game (which was originally given the moniker "The Big Game at the End of the Season", but was later dubbed the Million Dollar Game, after the amount of money awarded to the winning team, which, if divided, gave each player less than the losing team in the Pro Bowl).

Though paid attendance at games remained respectable, if unimpressive (overall attendance was only 10% below what the league's goal had been at the start of the season), the XFL ceased operations after just one season due to low television ratings. Facing stiff competition from the NCAA basketball tournament, the NBC telecast of the Chicago/New York-New Jersey game on March 31 received a 1.5 rating, at that time the lowest ever for any major network primetime weekend first-run sports television broadcast in the United States. During the season, many news and sports networks (even local networks within XFL cities) did not show highlights or even report scores. This led audiences to view the XFL as a joke league, rather than direct competitor to the NFL.

Despite initially agreeing to broadcast XFL games for two years and owning half of the league, NBC announced it would not broadcast a second XFL season; the network no longer had a full season of Saturday nights to offer the league because it had acquired the rights to the 2002 Winter Olympics, even if the XFL had been more successful or profitable. WWF Chairman Vince McMahon initially announced that the XFL would continue, as it still had UPN and TNN as broadcast outlets. In fact, expansion teams were being explored for cities such as Washington, D.C., and Detroit (Washington would later receive its team in the revived XFL). However, in order to continue broadcasting XFL games, UPN demanded that WWF SmackDown! broadcasts be cut from two hours to one and a half hours. McMahon found these terms unacceptable, and announced the XFL's closure on May 10, 2001. McMahon's chief adviser, a perplexed Nathan Livian, was quoted as saying "the situation is, indeed, very bad".

The XFL ranked No. 3 on TV Guide's list of the worst TV shows of all time in July 2002, as well as No. 2 on ESPN's list of biggest flops in sports, behind Ryan Leaf. In 2010, TV Guide Network also listed the show at No. 21 on its list of 25 Biggest TV Blunders. NBC's $35 million loss on the XFL was a factor in the network moving away from sports and ending its contract with the NBA, then its last remaining substantial professional sports package, in favor of focusing on its easier-to-schedule slate of scripted entertainment; Charles Barkley commented in 2002 that "If y'all hadn't wasted all that money on the XFL, y'all would still have basketball."

Many stories recapping the history of the XFL show photos of the crash of its promotional blimp in Oakland, California, portraying it retrospectively as an ill-omen for the league. The incident occurred a month before the opening game on Tuesday, January 9, 2001. The blimp was in Oakland as the league had flown it over the January 6 playoff game between the Oakland Raiders and Miami Dolphins, and intended to do the same with the following week's AFC Championship, also in Oakland. The pilots lost control of the airship, and were forced to evacuate. The ground crew were unable to secure the vehicle, and the "unattended blimp then floated five miles north over the Oakland Estuary, at one point reaching 1,600 feet, or about the height of the Central Park Tower in Midtown Manhattan (listed as the second tallest building in the United States as of 2023), until its gondola caught on a sailboat mast in the Central Basin marina. It draped over the roof of the Oyster Reef restaurant—next to where the boat was moored—and a nearby power line." While the pilot was hospitalized, no other major injuries were reported. The blimp needed $2.5 million in repairs (equivalent to $4.55 million in 2025), while the sailboat and restaurant had only minor damages.

Before the season started, a fictional XFL game appeared in the 2000 film The 6th Day, set in 2015.

== Legacy ==
NBC continued airing professional league football beyond the demise of the XFL, starting with the Arena Football League (AFL) television coverage from 2003 to 2006. In 2006, NBC returned to coverage of NFL games with NBC Sunday Night Football, eventually adding Thursday Night Football to its coverage in 2016.

The XFL's racier-than-average cheerleaders helped inspire the Lingerie Football League (now Extreme Football League) and "Lingerie Bowl" from 2003 to 2006. The LFL is currently the largest women's American football professional league.

XFL team names and logos sometimes appear in movies and television shows in which professional football needs to be dramatized, as licensing for NFL logos may be cost prohibitive (such as in the Arnold Schwarzenegger starring sci-fi film The 6th Day).

The United Football League later placed all four of its inaugural franchises in former XFL markets and stadiums. However, the UFL drew far fewer fans than the XFL average, and much less media attention: for example, the XFL's San Francisco Demons drew an average of 35,000 fans, while the UFL's California Redwoods drew an average of 6,000, despite both playing in the same ballpark. Three of the four charter teams, including the Redwoods, moved to other markets by the time of the UFL's third season.

ESPN produced a documentary surrounding the league, This Was the XFL, as part of its anthology series 30 for 30 (the title is a play on Vince McMahon shouting "This is the XFL!" before the opening game, changing "is" to "was" since the league failed). The film discusses the longtime friendship between McMahon and Ebersol, as seen through the eyes of Dick's son, Charlie Ebersol, who directs the film. McMahon, Dick Ebersol, Dick Schanzer, Rusty Tillman, Al Luginbill, Rod Smart, Tommy Maddox, Paris Lenon, league President Basil DeVito, costume designer Jay Howarth, Jesse Ventura, Matt Vasgersian, Jonathan Coachman, Bob Costas, and Jerry Jones all provided interviews for the film. It debuted at Doc NYC November 11, 2016, and premiered on ESPN on February 2, 2017.

== Notable players ==
Notable players included league MVP and Los Angeles quarterback Tommy Maddox, who signed with the NFL's Pittsburgh Steelers after the XFL folded (Maddox later became the starting quarterback for the Steelers in 2002 and led them to that year's playoffs, as well as continuing to start for them into 2004). Los Angeles used the first pick in the XFL draft to select a former NFL quarterback, Scott Milanovich. Milanovich lost the starting quarterback job to Maddox, who was placed on the Xtreme as one of a handful of players put on each team due to geographic distance between the player's college and the team's hometown. Another of the better-known players was Las Vegas running back Rod Smart, who first gained popularity because the name on the back of his jersey read "He Hate Me." Smart, who was only picked 357th in the draft, later went on to play for the Philadelphia Eagles, Carolina Panthers, Oakland Raiders, and Edmonton Eskimos of the CFL. His Panther teammate Jake Delhomme named his newborn horse "She Hate Me" as a reference to him. Smart played in Super Bowl XXXVIII, becoming one of seven XFL players to play in a Super Bowl. Receiver Yo Murphy also achieved this as a member of the St. Louis Rams in Super Bowl XXXVI, along with winning the 95th Grey Cup with the Saskatchewan Roughriders in 2007. Tommy Maddox played for a Super Bowl team (the Pittsburgh Steelers) in Super Bowl XL in Detroit, (although Maddox, by that time, a third-string quarterback, did not play in the game, which turned out to be his last appearance in uniform before retiring). Lastly, Las Vegas Outlaws DB Kelly Herndon played in Super Bowl XL with the Seattle Seahawks in 2005, where he is remembered for intercepting a pass and returning it a then-record 76 yards. Although he did not play for an NFL team after the XFL's lone season, former Las Vegas Outlaws offensive guard Isaac Davis also had a notable NFL career, playing in 58 games over a six-year career. Davis started for the San Diego Chargers in Super Bowl XXIX. John Avery went on to play for both the Edmonton Eskimos and Toronto Argonauts, where he was an All Star selection in 2002, and won the Grey Cup in 2004.

The last active player to have played in the XFL is Canadian placekicker Paul McCallum, who last played for the BC Lions in the 2016 CFL season.

=== Played in the CFL ===
- Kelvin Anderson
- John Avery
- Duane Butler
- Jeremaine Copeland
- Jerry Crafts
- Marcus Crandell
- Reggie Durden
- Eric England
- Daryl Hobbs
- Kelvin Kinney
- Paul Lacoste
- Kelly Malveaux
- Paul McCallum
- Saladin McCullough
- Scott Milanovich
- Yo Murphy
- Noel Prefontaine
- Bobby Singh
- Rod Smart
- Bernard Williams

=== Won the Grey Cup ===
- Kelvin Anderson (1998 Calgary Stampeders, 2001 Calgary Stampeders)
- John Avery (2004 Toronto Argonauts)
- Jeremaine Copeland (2002 Montreal Alouettes, 2008 Calgary Stampeders)
- Marcus Crandell (2001 Calgary Stampeders, 2007 Saskatchewan Roughriders)
- Reggie Durden (2002 Montreal Alouettes)
- Eric England (2004 Toronto Argonauts)
- Paul McCallum (2006 BC Lions, 2011 BC Lions)
- Scott Milanovich (2012 Toronto Argonauts as head coach)
- Yo Murphy (2007 Saskatchewan Roughriders)
- Noel Prefontaine (2004 Toronto Argonauts, 2012 Toronto Argonauts)
- Bobby Singh (2006 BC Lions)

=== Played in the NFL ===
- Bennie Anderson
- Joe Aska
- John Avery
- Aaron Bailey
- Pat Barnes
- Michael Blair
- Jeff Brohm
- Butler By'not'e
- José Cortez
- Kirby Dar Dar
- Isaac Davis
- Jim Druckenmiller
- Jamal Duff
- Keith Elias
- Eric England
- Leomont Evans
- Mike Furrey
- Steve Gleason
- Alvin Harper
- Kelly Herndon
- Daryl Hobbs
- James Hundon
- Corey Ivy
- LeShon Johnson
- Charles Jordan
- Kevin Kaesviharn
- Paris Lenon (last former XFL player on an NFL roster, 2013)
- Tommy Maddox
- Yo Murphy
- Latario Rachal
- David Richie
- Angel Rubio
- Rashaan Salaam
- Nicky Savoie
- Rashaan Shehee
- Rod Smart
- Ed Smith
- Kevin Swayne
- Brad Trout
- Casey Weldon
- Craig Whelihan
- Stepfret Williams

=== Played in the Super Bowl ===
- Ron Carpenter (Super Bowl XXXIV, St. Louis Rams)
- Isaac Davis (Super Bowl XXIX, San Diego Chargers)
- Alvin Harper (Super Bowl XXVII, Super Bowl XXVIII, Dallas Cowboys)
- Kelly Herndon (Super Bowl XL, Seattle Seahawks)
- Corey Ivy (Super Bowl XXXVII, Tampa Bay Buccaneers)
- Paris Lenon (Super Bowl XLVIII, Denver Broncos)
- Tommy Maddox (Super Bowl XL, Pittsburgh Steelers)
- Yo Murphy (Super Bowl XXXVI, St. Louis Rams)
- Bobby Singh (Super Bowl XXXIV, St. Louis Rams)
- Rod Smart (Super Bowl XXXVIII, Carolina Panthers)

=== Won a Super Bowl ===
- Ron Carpenter (Super Bowl XXXIV, St. Louis Rams)
- Fred Coleman (Super Bowl XXXVI, New England Patriots)
- Alvin Harper (Super Bowl XXVII, Super Bowl XXVIII, Dallas Cowboys)
- Corey Ivy (Super Bowl XXXVII, Tampa Bay Buccaneers)
- Tommy Maddox (Super Bowl XL, Pittsburgh Steelers)
- David Richie (Super Bowl XXXII, Denver Broncos)
- Bobby Singh (Super Bowl XXXIV, St. Louis Rams)

=== Won both an XFL Championship and Super Bowl ===
- Ron Carpenter (Super Bowl XXXIV, St. Louis Rams)
- Tommy Maddox (Super Bowl XL, Pittsburgh Steelers)
- David Richie (Super Bowl XXXII, Denver Broncos)
- Bobby Singh (Super Bowl XXXIV, St. Louis Rams)

=== Won an XFL Championship, Grey Cup, and Super Bowl ===
- Bobby Singh

=== Played in the Arena Football League ===
- Jerry Crafts
- Eric England
- Mike Furrey
- Mark Grieb
- James Hundon
- Kelvin Kinney
- Tommy Maddox
- Kevin Swayne
- Craig Whelihan

=== Wrestled for WWE ===
- Richard Young (Ricky Ortiz)

=== Starting quarterbacks ===
Team	Regular season	Postseason
Eastern Division
Birmingham Thunderbolts	Casey Weldon (2–4); Jay Barker (0–2); Graham Leigh (0–2)	
Chicago Enforcers	Kevin McDougal (5–1); Tim Lester (0–4)	Kevin McDougal (0–1)
New York/New Jersey Hitmen	Wally Richardson (3–2); Charles Puleri (0–3); Corte McGuffey (1–1)	
Orlando Rage	Jeff Brohm (6–1); Brian Kuklick (2–1)	Brian Kuklick (0–1)
Western Division
Las Vegas Outlaws	Ryan Clement (3–3); Mark Grieb (1–2); Mike Cawley (0–1)	
Los Angeles Xtreme	Tommy Maddox (7–3)	Tommy Maddox (2–0)
Memphis Maniax	Jim Druckenmiller (4–3); Marcus Crandell (1–2)	
San Francisco Demons	Mike Pawlawski (4–4); Pat Barnes (1–1)	Mike Pawlawski (0–1); Pat Barnes (1–0)

== Awards ==
Award	Winner	Position	Team
Most Valuable Player	Tommy Maddox	QB	Los Angeles Xtreme
Runner-up	John Avery	RB	Chicago Enforcers
Million Dollar Game MVP	José Cortez	K	Los Angeles Xtreme
Coach of the Year	Galen Hall	HC	Orlando Rage

=== All-League Team ===
The following players were named to the first-ever All-XFL Team:

Offense
QB	Jeff Brohm (Orlando Rage)
RB	John Avery (Chicago Enforcers); Rod Smart (Las Vegas Outlaws)
WR	Jeremaine Copeland (Los Angeles Xtreme); Stepfret Williams (Birmingham Thunderbolts)
TE	Rickey Brady (Las Vegas Outlaws)
OT	Chris Perez (Chicago Enforcers); Lonnie Palelei (Las Vegas Outlaws)
C	Mike Sheldon (Memphis Maniax)
OG	Glenn Rountree (Memphis Maniax); Jason Gamble (Orlando Rage)

Defense
DE	Shante Carver (Memphis Maniax); Kelvin Kinney (Las Vegas Outlaws)
DT	Chris Maumalanga (New York/New Jersey Hitmen); Angel Rubio (Las Vegas Outlaws)
LB	Joe Tuipala (Las Vegas Outlaws); James Burgess (Orlando Rage); James Willis (Birmingham Thunderbolts)
CB	Corey Ivy (Chicago Enforcers); Damen Wheeler (New York/New Jersey Hitmen)
S	Brandon Sanders (Las Vegas Outlaws); Brad Trout (New York/New Jersey Hitmen)

Special teams
ST	Jimmy Cunningham (San Francisco Demons)
K	José Cortez (Los Angeles Xtreme)

=== Players of the week ===
Week	Offensive Player of the Week			Defensive Player of the Week		
Week	Player	Team	Position	Player	Team	Position
Week 1	John Avery	Chicago	RB	Shawn Banks	Orlando	LB
Week 2	Jeremaine Copeland	Los Angeles	WR	Omar Brown	Orlando	S
Week 3	Terry Battle	San Francisco	RB	Duane Butler	Birmingham	S
Week 4	Rashaan Salaam	Memphis	RB	Israel Raybon	New York/New Jersey	DE
Week 5	Kevin McDougal	Chicago	QB	Jermaine Miles	San Francisco	DE
Week 6	Jim Druckenmiller	Memphis	QB	Brad Trout	New York/New Jersey	S
Week 7	Tommy Maddox	Los Angeles	QB	Carl Simpson	Las Vegas	DT
Week 8	John Avery (2)	Chicago	RB	Corey Ivy	Chicago	DB
Week 9	Kevin McDougal (2)	Chicago	QB	Jamie Baisley	Chicago	LB
Week 10	Rashaan Shehee, Saladin McCullough	Los Angeles	RB	Joey Eloms	New York/New Jersey	CB

== Current status and revival ==
The 2001 XFL games are now part of the WWE Video Library, the rights to which have been held by NBC's streaming service Peacock since March 2021.

In September 2012, WWE attempted to file a new XFL trademark for use in wrestling and football which was previously filed in 2009 under XFL LLC. The application remained pending since WWE never put together a "Statement of Use" for the trademark. In July 2015, the XFL's first trademark extension was granted.

On December 15, 2017, it was reported that McMahon was seriously considering a revival of the XFL. WWE didn't confirm or deny the rumors, but released a statement that McMahon was launching a new company, known as Alpha Entertainment, that was looking to expand into sports and entertainment properties "including professional football", and that WWE itself wasn't returning to professional football.

Noted wrestling journalist Dave Meltzer speculated that McMahon was starting a shell corporation with his own money to protect WWE shareholders on a potential XFL revival. A revival of the XFL would air either on traditional TV or the WWE Network, and would be toned down compared to its original incarnation due to CTE concerns in football that surfaced in the early 2010s. On December 22, 2017, McMahon sold $100 million worth of WWE shares, which required notification to the U.S. Securities and Exchange Commission; the SEC reported that it was done so that McMahon could fund Alpha Entertainment. WWE shares did in fact decline slightly due to the report, with Citigroup downgrading WWE shares from "buy" to "neutral".

On January 25, 2018, Alpha Entertainment announced a new incarnation of the XFL which began play in 2020. The XFL did not utilize the same sports entertainment gimmicks as the original, instead focusing on adjusting rules to increase the speed of play. NBC had no involvement with this incarnation, which was, instead, carried by the outlets of ESPN Inc. and (during its 2020 season) Fox Corporation. Following the 2020 season (cut short by stay-at-home orders tied to the COVID pandemic), McMahon sold the XFL to a consortium led by his former wrestler Dwayne Johnson (The Rock) along with Johnson's business partners Dany Garcia and RedBird Capital. The league played one season in 2023, but would later merge with the USFL (established by Fox Corporation during the XFL's 2020–23 hiatus) to form the United Football League, with the XFL name kept as a conference name for the next two years until Mike Repole purchased a stake in the UFL and dissolved the XFL conference in October 2025.

== See also ==
- Major League Rugby
