= John Avery (gridiron football) =

American gridiron football player (born 1976)

No. 20, 33
- Positions: Running back, kickoff returner

Personal information
- Born: January 11, 1976 (age 50); Richmond, Virginia, U.S.
- Listed height: 5 ft 10 in (1.78 m)
- Listed weight: 192 lb (87 kg)

Career information
- High school: Asheville (Asheville, North Carolina)
- College: Northwest Mississippi (1994–1995); Ole Miss (1996–1997)
- NFL draft: 1998: 1st round, 29th overall pick

Career history
- Miami Dolphins (1998–1999); Denver Broncos (1999); Chicago Enforcers (2001); Dallas Cowboys (2001)*; Edmonton Eskimos (2002); Minnesota Vikings (2003); Toronto Argonauts (2004–2007)
- * Offseason or practice squad member only

Awards and highlights
- Grey Cup champion (2004); Eddie James Memorial Trophy (2002); CFL All-Star (2002); CFL West All-Star (2002); CFL rushing yards leader (2002); Second-team All-SEC (1997)

Career NFL statistics
- Rushing yards: 524
- Rushing average: 3.5
- Rushing touchdowns: 2
- Receptions: 16
- Receiving yards: 115
- Receiving touchdowns: 2
- Kickoff return yards: 1,623
- Stats at Pro Football Reference

Career CFL statistics
- Rushing yards: 3,707
- Rushing average: 5.3
- Rushing touchdowns: 20
- Receptions: 144
- Receiving yards: 1,251
- Receiving touchdowns: 6
- Return yards: 814

John Edward Avery III (born January 11, 1976) is an American former professional football player who was a running back and kickoff returner in the National Football League (NFL) and Canadian Football League (CFL). He played college football for the Ole Miss Rebels and was selected by the Miami Dolphins in the first round of the 1998 NFL draft. He also played in the NFL for the Denver Broncos and Minnesota Vikings. He played in the CFL for the Edmonton Eskimos and Toronto Argonauts and he was also in the XFL with the Chicago Enforcers in 2001.

== College career ==
Avery attended and played football at Asheville High School in Asheville, North Carolina and, following graduation, continued his playing career at Northwest Mississippi Community College in Senatobia, Mississippi.

After two years at Northwest Mississippi Community College, Avery enrolled at the University of Mississippi. In 1996, he started five games at running back, rushing 181 times for 788 yards and 5 touchdowns, 16 receptions for 99 yards and 17 kickoff returns for 473 yards and touchdowns. In 1997, Avery started nine games for the Rebels, including the Motor City Bowl. During his final season with the Rebels, Avery totaled 166 carries for 862 yards and 7 touchdowns, added 13 receptions for 113 yards, 8 punt returns for 46 yards, and returned 13 kickoffs for 315 yards and one touchdown.

In 1997, he was a finalist for the Conerly Trophy.

== Professional career ==
=== Miami Dolphins ===
Avery was selected by the Miami Dolphins in the first round of the 1998 NFL draft with the 29th overall pick.

=== Denver Broncos ===
Avery was traded to the Denver Broncos from the Dolphins in exchange for wide receiver Marcus Nash on September 21, 1999. Avery saw limited action with Denver and was released in training camp the following season.

=== Chicago Enforcers ===
In 2001, Avery was drafted by the Chicago Enforcers with the eighth overall pick of the 2001 XFL draft. He started 10 games for the Enforcers of the XFL. He led the short-lived XFL in rushing with 800 yards (on 150 carries for a 5.3 yard average), rushed for five touchdowns, and also caught 17 passes for 297 yards and two touchdowns. He was runner-up for the XFL player of the year award. Avery wore the No. 20 in the XFL, but in the Enforcers' first game of the season against the Orlando Rage he was forced to wear No. 22 for the second half because his jersey was ripped early in the game. After the conclusion of the XFL's 2001 season, Avery attended the Dallas Cowboys training camp but suffered a hamstring injury and was subsequently released.

=== Edmonton Eskimos ===
Avery's most successful year in professional football, to date, was 2002. He signed with the Canadian Football League's Edmonton Eskimos on April 26, 2002. Avery finished the season with 229 carries for 1,448 yards (6.3 yd. avg.) and nine touchdowns. Avery started the season as the second string running back behind incumbent starter Ronald Williams: as a result, he was used sparingly in the first four games of the season. When Williams was injured in a week 4 game in Saskatchewan, Avery assumed the starting halfback position. He never looked back, winning the CFL rushing title by almost 300 yards. He scored two touchdowns in the Western Division Finals, leading the Eskimos to a victory and setting the team up for a home appearance in the Grey Cup Championship at Commonwealth Stadium in Edmonton. However, Avery suffered a leg injury in the West Final, which limited his effectiveness in the Grey Cup despite his best efforts. The Eskimos came up short in the Grey Cup game at the hands of the Montreal Alouettes, losing 25–16, but Avery finished the season a winner of the Eddie James Memorial Trophy (as the Western Division's leading rusher) and a CFL All-Star.

=== Minnesota Vikings ===
Avery signed as a free agent with the Minnesota Vikings on February 13, 2003. He played six games with one rush for 0 yards and 2 receptions, and returned 16 kickoffs for 346 yards, for a 21.6 yard average. Avery was placed on the Vikings injured reserved list with a knee injury on October 24, 2003.

=== Toronto Argonauts ===
Avery was signed by the CFL's Toronto Argonauts in 2004. Avery did not play in the Argos' two pre-season games, but he made his Toronto debut in Week 1 against the Saskatchewan Roughriders. Avery rushed 8 times for 22 yards and caught 5 passes for 27 yards in that game. In Week 8, he met his former club, Edmonton, for the first time ever, and scored his first two touchdowns as an Argonaut. Avery started in the Labour Day Classic against the Hamilton Tiger-Cats in Hamilton in Week 12, and rushed for 110 yards (his first 100-yard running game as an Argonaut) on 17 carries and 1 touchdown, including his longest career CFL run – 74 yards. Avery did not suit up in Week 20 against Montreal because of a knee injury.

In the 2004 Eastern Division Semi-Final, Avery started at running back for the Argos, rushed 13 times for 32 yards (longest gain: 19 yards), and caught 1 pass for −5 yards against the Hamilton Tiger-Cats at Toronto's SkyDome (won by Toronto, 24–6). In the Eastern Final at Montreal, Avery recorded his first career win against the Alouettes in a 26–18 Argos' triumph. Avery spent most of game blocking but was handed the ball 6 times in the second half and raced for 34 yards, including the game winning romp of 25 yards for an Argos' touchdown.

At the 92nd Grey Cup Championship, Avery started at running back for the Argonauts, rushed 11 times for 75 yards (longest gain: 26 yards), and caught 4 passes for 24 yards (longest gain: 10 yards) to help the Argos win their 15th Grey Cup Championship in team history with a 27–19 triumph over the BC Lions. This Grey Cup championship also marked the first championship at any level for Avery.

In the 2005 season, Avery missed both Toronto pre-season games due to an adductor injury. Avery started 13 of 15 games at running back for the Argonauts before suffering a season-ending hamstring injury against the Winnipeg Blue Bombers in Week 15. In Week 5 against the Alouettes, Avery caught the game-winning touchdown on a 14-yard reception from Argos' quarterback Damon Allen. The following week against the Winnipeg Blue Bombers, Avery generated 148 all-purpose yards in 34–27 win. In the 2005 Labour Day classic against Hamilton, he generated 90 yards rushing. In Week 11, Avery started at running back and generated 123 all-purpose yards and 1 touchdown against Saskatchewan. In his season-ending game against the Blue Bombers, Avery caught the Argos’ first touchdown pass of the game before leaving in the second quarter with the hamstring injury.

The 2006 season began with former NFL running back Ricky Williams making a highly publicized move to the Argonauts as a result of an off-season signing (and Williams' NFL suspension for violating the league's drug policy). The star import's presence bumped Avery further down the Argos' running back depth chart, but Williams' broken arm in a July 22 win over Saskatchewan left the door open for Avery. Prior to his scheduled return to the starting lineup against the BC Lions in Week 7, Avery suffered a leg injury in practice which delayed his comeback for another two weeks. On August 12, 2006, Avery made his 2006 debut against the Hamilton Tiger-Cats in Hamilton rushing for 74 yards on 13 carries while also catching two receptions for 31 yards. The following week against the Montreal Alouettes at home, Avery ran for 94 yards on 21 carries while scoring a touchdown.

On January 31, 2008, contract ended with the Argonauts.

Armbar Athletics

In 2014, Avery joined the Hamilton Touch Football League in Hamilton ON Canada. Avery played as a member of Armbar Athletics (former division champions). Avery retired after one season.

== Career statistics ==
| | | | Rushing | | | | | | Receiving |
| Year | League | Team | Att. | Yards | Avg | Long | TD | Fumbles | No. | Yards | Avg | Long | TD |
|---|---|---|---|---|---|---|---|---|---|---|---|---|---|
| 1998 | NFL | Miami | 143 | 503 | 3.5 | 44 | 2 | 5 | 10 | 67 | 6.7 | 19 | 1 |
| 1999 | NFL | Denver | 5 | 21 | 4.2 | 11 | 0 | 0 | 4 | 24 | 6.0 | 11 | 0 |
| 2001 | XFL | Chicago | 150 | 800 | 5.3 | 73 | 5 | ? | 17 | 297 | 17.5 | 68 | 2 |
| 2002 | CFL | Edmonton | 229 | 1,448 | 6.3 | 61 | 9 | 10 | 45 | 387 | 8.6 | 31 | 2 |
| 2003 | NFL | Minnesota | 1 | 0 | 0.0 | 0 | 0 | 1 | 2 | 24 | 12.0 | 13 | 1 |
| 2004 | CFL | Toronto | 202 | 974 | 4.8 | 74 | 4 | 5 | 48 | 364 | 7.6 | 27 | 1 |
| 2005 | CFL | Toronto | 109 | 526 | 4.8 | 26 | 2 | 4 | 36 | 393 | 10.9 | 46 | 3 |
| 2006 | CFL | Toronto | 82 | 432 | 5.3 | 0 | 2 | 1 | 8 | 41 | 5.1 | 17 | 0 |
| 2007 | CFL | Toronto | 75 | 327 | 4.4 | 0 | 3 | 1 | 7 | 66 | 9.4 | 18 | 0 |
| Totals | | | 996 | 5031 | 5.1 | 74 | 27 | | 177 | 1663 | 9.4 | 68 | 10 |
