= Mark Grieb =

American football player and coach (born 1974)

Biographical details
- Born: May 23, 1974 (age 52); Torrance, California, U.S.

Playing career
- 1994–1996: UC Davis
- 1997: Anaheim Piranhas
- 1997: Milwaukee Mustangs
- 1998: Scottish Claymores
- 1999–2008: San Jose SaberCats
- 2001: Las Vegas Outlaws
- 2011–2012: San Jose SaberCats
- Position: Quarterback

Coaching career (HC unless noted)
- 2000–2001: Stanford (GA)
- 2003: Menlo (OC)
- 20??: Monterey Peninsula (assistant)
- 20??: Foothill (assistant)
- 2011: Menlo (WR)
- 2013–2014: Menlo
- 2017–: Sacred Heart Prep

Head coaching record
- Overall: 8–13

Accomplishments and honors

Awards
- 3× ArenaBowl champion (2002, 2004, 2007); 2× ArenaBowl MVP (2004, 2007); 2× ArenaBowl Offensive Player of the Game (2004, 2007); AFL Offensive Player of The Year (2002); 2× First-team All-Arena (2002, 2005); Second-team All-Arena (2004); AFL passing touchdowns leader (2008); 3× AFL passing yards leader (2005, 2006, 2011); AFL's 25 Greatest Players #18 (2012); Al Lucas Award (2004); First-team CoSIDA All-Region (1996)

Mark Richard Grieb (born May 23, 1974) is an American football coach and former quarterback. He spent the majority of his playing career with the San Jose SaberCats of the Arena Football League (AFL). Grieb currently serves as the head coach of the Sacred Heart Prep Gators football team in Atherton, California. He was a 13-year veteran of the AFL, having played quarterback for the Anaheim Piranhas (1997) and San Jose SaberCats (1999–2008, 2011–2012). Grieb also played in NFL Europe for the Scottish Claymores (1998) and in the XFL with the Las Vegas Outlaws (2001). Grieb is the second quarterback in AFL history to throw for over 47,000 yards, over 900 touchdowns, and over 3,800 completions. He officially retired on November 8, 2012. He played college football at University of California, Davis. Grieb passed for 48,803 yards between the AFL, XFL and NFL Europe.

Grieb appeared in three ArenaBowls, winning titles in 2002, 2004 and 2007.

== Early life ==
Grieb attended Oak Grove High School in San Jose, California, where he was a student and a three-sport athlete in football, basketball, and baseball.

== College career ==
Grieb played college football at UC Davis. He began his Aggies career on the junior varsity team his freshman year and redshirted behind starting quarterback Khari Jones. In 1994, starting quarterback Eric Walcha was injured in the season opener. The following week against Cal State Northridge, Grieb made his first collegiate start in a 52–13 loss. Grieb started and won the following week against Southwest Texas State. On the season he appeared in seven games (2 starts) and threw for 595 yards. In 1995, Grieb led the Aggies to a 6–3–1 record while throwing for 2,226 yards and 17 touchdowns to just six interceptions. In 1996, Grieb and the Aggies finished the regular season 6–4, making the 1996 NCAA Division II Postseason. Grieb threw for 192 yards and two touchdowns against No. 1 Texas A&M–Kingsville in a 17–14 upset. He finished his career in the school's top 10 in six different offensive categories. As a senior, he passed for a school-record 3,230 yards and 25 touchdowns, and earned First-team CoSIDA All-Region honors, was a Football Gazette All-American pick, and was a finalist for the Harlon Hill Trophy, which is given to the NCAA Division II college football MVP.

=== Statistics ===
Season	Team	Games			Passing								Rushing			
Season	Team	GP	GS	Record	Cmp	Att	Pct	Yds	Y/A	TD	Int	Rtg	Att	Yds	Avg	TD
1994	UC Davis	7	2	1–1	49	91	53.8	595	10.9	1	7	97.0	17	−39	−0.4	0
1995	UC Davis	10	10	6–3–1	163	286	56.9	2,226	7.8	17	6	137.7	42	−11	−0.2	2
1996	UC Davis	10	10	6–4	168	306	54.9	2,461	8.0	17	8	135.6	56	−70	−0.8	2
Regular season totals		27	22	13–8–1	380	683	55.6	5,282	7.7	35	21	131.4	115	−120	−1.0	4
Postseason totals		3	3	2–1	61	94	64.8	769	8.1	8	4	153.2	7	−26	−3.7	0
Career totals		30	25	15–9–1	441	777	56.8	6,051	7.7	43	25	134.0	122	−146	−1.2	4

- 1996 NCAA Division II Postseason
- Texas A&M–Kingsville – 18/35, 192 yards, 2 TD, INT. 3 rushes, −4 yards
- Central Oklahoma – 18/25 249 yards, 3 TD, INT
- Carson–Newman – 25/34, 328 yards, 3 TD, 2 INT. 4 rushes, −22 yards.

== Professional career ==
=== Anaheim Piranhas ===
In 1997, Grieb signed with the Anaheim Piranhas of the Arena Football League. He began the season as third-string quarterback. Due to injuries, Grieb earned his professional start against the Florida Bobcats in week four. In his first career start, Grieb led the winless Piranhas to their first victory of the season. Grieb threw for three touchdowns and ran for two more as he was named game MVP honors. Grieb and the Piranhas were winless in the following three games, which led to a trade where they acquired veteran quarterback John Kaleo. He remained the backup the backup to Kaleo for the rest of the season. On the season, Grieb led the team with 20 touchdown passes to four interceptions while completing 56% of his passes for 1,003 yards. At the conclusion of the season the Piranhas ceased operations. Grieb was then selected by the Buffalo Destroyers in the 1998 AFL dispersal draft, but opted to play for the Scottish Claymores instead.

=== Scottish Claymores ===
In 1998, Grieb signed with the Scottish Claymores of the NFL Europe (NFLE). Grieb started the season as the backup quarterback to Jim Ballard. In week four against the England Monarchs, Grieb replaced Ballard due to an injury. Grieb completed 8-of-18 passes for 91 yards and an interception in the loss. Grieb started the following week against Barcelona, where he completed 15-of-25 passes for 231 yards with two touchdowns and two interceptions. Grieb led the Claymores to their first victory of the season 30–10 over the Dragons. He remainder the starter the following week against Rhein, but was just 13-of-27 passing for 146 yards with one touchdown and interception in the loss. Grieb's only other statistics on the season came the following week against England where he was 2-for-2 passing for 31 yards.

=== San Jose SaberCats ===
On March 13, 1999, Grieb was traded to the San Jose SaberCats in exchange for Tony Burse and Melvin Phillips. During the 1999 season, Grieb was the backup quarterback to Scott Wood. In 2000, Grieb became the starting quarterback of the SaberCats and led them to a 12–2 regular season record and second round postseason appearance. In February 2001, Grieb joined the Las Vegas Outlaws midway through their inaugural season until their season concluded on April 7. He rejoined San Jose and made his first appearance on May 4 against Oklahoma. By week nine, Grieb replaced John Dutton as the starting quarterback. He set Arena League records with 10.2 yards per passing attempt and 134.2 passer rating. San Jose made the playoffs for the second consecutive season, but fell to Nashville Kats in the second round. In 2002, on his way to completing an AFL regular season record 13–1 year, he was injured against the Arizona Rattlers, sustaining a season-ending broken collarbone. Dutton, Grieb's backup at the time, took over and continued to help lead the team to the ArenaBowl, winning it against the same Rattlers. On the season Grieb was named Arena Football League Offensive Player of the Year and First-team All-Arena.

In 2003, Grieb led the SaberCats to a 12–4 record before falling to the Rattlers in the second round of the playoffs. In the 2004 season, Grieb and SaberCats defeated Arizona in the ArenaBowl XVIII. Grieb was named the games most valuable player. The SaberCats made the playoffs the following two seasons while Grieb led the league in passing yards in back-to-back seasons for the first time in his career. In 2004 he was named Second-team All-Arena and was named First-team All-Arena in 2005.

In 2007, Grieb led the SaberCats to a 13–3 record and a ArenaBowl XXI championship. Grieb was once again named the games most valuable player against Columbus and joined George LaFrance and Stevie Thomas as the only players to accomplish this feature. On the season Grieb threw 100 touchdown passes for the first time in his career. In 2008, Grieb led the SaberCats back to the Arena Bowl, but fell to Philadelphia 59–56. He led the league with 100 touchdown passes. At the conclusion of the 2008 season, the league was suspended for 2009 with Grieb a free agent. In 2011, when the SaberCats started back up, they signed Grieb back to the team for his 11th season with the team. In week six, Grieb won his 100th game as a starting quarterback in the Arena League. The following week against Philadelphia, Grieb won his 100th game as the starting quarterback of the SaberCats. On the season, Grieb led the league in passing yards for the third time in his career. The following season he would throw for a career high 5,744 yards and 112 touchdowns. In what would be Grieb's final season, he finished second all-time in single season passing yards. In the same season, Utah's Tommy Grady threw for a record breaking 5,870 yards. On November 8, 2012, Grieb announced his retirement from professional football.

=== Las Vegas Outlaws ===
Headed into week four of the 2001 XFL season, Grieb was signed by the Las Vegas Outlaws. He was signed due to injuries of projected starter Chuck Clements and a separated shoulder of starting quarterback Ryan Clement. Third string quarterback Mike Cawley started the week prior, but was released due to poor play. Grieb was given an angle of being a young man signed off the street who was pursuing his MBA, ignoring his career in arena football. The signing reconnected Grieb with his former head coach Jim Criner, who he had played for with the Scottish Claymores in the 1998 season. Grieb surpassed backup quarterback Jim Ballard on the depth chart, who he had backed up for in Scotland.

Grieb started his first game for the Outlaws less than a week after being signed. Against San Francisco, Grieb completed 11-of-23 passes for 105 yards and a touchdown as the Outlaws defeated the Demons 16–9. Grieb remained the starter the following week against Chicago, where he went 9-of-18 passing for 98 yards with two touchdowns and two interceptions. The Outlaws lost to the Enforcers 15–13, and Clement returned from his injury and was named the starter. Criner had previously mentioned to the media that Grieb would remain the starter. Grieb returned to action four weeks later against San Francisco in week nine when Clement was injured on a late hit penalty in the fourth quarter. Grieb completed 2-of-2 passes for 21 yards in his lone series before Clement returned in the loss. Grieb then started the season finale against Memphis, but was only able to manage three points offensively. On the season, Grieb appeared in four games (3 starts) and completed 37-of-78 passes for 408 yards and three touchdowns to four interceptions.

=== Records and awards ===
Grieb holds several records in AFL history including:

- Pass completion percentage for one year: 73% (since broken)
- Passer rating for one year: 134.15
- Career passer rating: 121.93 (since broken)

== Career statistics ==
AFL Offensive Player of the Year
Arena Bowl MVP
Won the ArenaBowl
AFL record
Led the league

=== AFL ===
Regular season
Year	Team	Games			Passing								Rushing			
Year	Team	GP	GS	Record	Cmp	Att	Pct	Yds	Y/A	TD	Int	Rtg	Att	Yds	Y/A	TD
1997	ANA	8	4	1–3	88	158	55.7	1,003	6.3	20	4	104.0	6	15	2.5	2
1999	SJ	12	1	1–0	17	45	37.8	135	3.0	2	0	60.9	3	14	4.7	0
2000	SJ	14	13	11–2	217	339	64.0	3,107	9.2	62	3	129.5	13	35	2.7	2
2001	SJ	8	6	5–1	157	229	68.6	2,343	10.2	47	4	134.2	6	24	4.0	0
2002	SJ	13	13	12–1	249	385	64.7	3,346	8.7	70	5	126.4	5	13	2.6	0
2003	SJ	16	16	12–4	310	477	65.0	3,971	8.3	72	16	116.5	8	−4	−0.5	0
2004	SJ	16	16	11–5	335	459	73.0	4,111	9.0	75	7	133.5	9	2	0.2	1
2005	SJ	16	16	9–7	375	547	68.6	4,803	8.8	84	16	123.2	10	17	1.7	1
2006	SJ	16	16	10–6	395	604	65.4	4,834	8.0	83	10	122.6	19	−45	−2.4	0
2007	SJ	16	16	13–3	397	563	70.5	4,578	8.1	100	12	125.4	8	27	3.4	2
2008	SJ	16	16	11–5	415	606	68.5	4,611	7.6	100	18	118.1	14	43	3.1	1
2011	SJ	18	18	7–11	455	677	67.2	5,310	7.8	95	25	115.0	17	25	1.5	4
2012	SJ	18	18	12–6	476	705	67.5	5,744	8.1	112	20	120.1	7	32	4.6	3
Career		187	169	115–54	3,886	5,794	67.1	47,896	8.3	922	140	121.9	125	198	1.6	16

Postseason
Year	Team	Games			Passing								Rushing			
Year	Team	GP	GS	Record	Cmp	Att	Pct	Yds	Y/A	TD	Int	Rtg	Att	Yds	Y/A	TD
2000	SJ	2	2	1–1	36	63	57.1	388	6.1	9	2	97.9	3	11	0.0	1
2001	SJ	2	2	1–1	44	68	64.7	571	8.3	14	0	130.6	1	1	1.0	0
2002	SJ	Did not play due to injury														
2003	SJ	2	2	1–1	37	62	59.7	572	9.2	11	2	116.4	0	0	0.0	0
2004	SJ	3	3	3–0	76	108	70.4	819	7.5	17	0	131.7	3	3	1.0	1
2005	SJ	1	1	0–1	34	55	61.8	392	7.1	6	1	103.0	0	0	0.0	0
2006	SJ	2	2	1–1	52	70	74.3	634	9.0	13	1	135.4	2	15	7.5	2
2007	SJ	3	3	3–0	81	107	75.7	824	7.7	19	1	132.9	3	10	3.3	0
2008	SJ	3	3	2–1	76	108	70.4	837	7.7	23	4	117.2	2	0	0.0	0
2012	SJ	1	1	0–1	26	57	45.6	263	4.6	5	2	66.6	0	0	0.0	0
Career		19	19	12–7	462	668	69.1	5,300	7.9	117	13	128.4	14	40	2.9	4

=== NFLE ===
Year	Team	Games			Passing									Rushing				
Year	Team	GP	GS	Record	Cmp	Att	Pct	Yds	Y/A	Lng	TD	Int	Rtg	Att	Yds	Y/A	Lng	TD
1998	SCO	4	2	1–1	38	72	52.8	499	6.9	53	3	4	65.7	10	24	2.4	7	0
Career		3	2	1–1	38	72	52.8	499	6.9	53	3	4	65.7	10	24	2.4	7	0

=== XFL ===
Year	Team	Games			Passing									Rushing				
Year	Team	GP	GS	Record	Cmp	Att	Pct	Yds	Y/A	Lng	TD	Int	Rtg	Att	Yds	Y/A	Lng	TD
2001	LV	4	3	1–2	37	78	47.4	408	5.2	41	3	4	54.9	2	−2	−1.0	−1	0
Career		4	3	1–2	37	78	47.4	408	5.2	41	3	4	54.9	2	-2	-1.0	-1	0

== Coaching career ==
On April 3, 2013, Grieb was named the head football coach at Menlo College. In February 2015, Menlo dropped its football program. On April 26, 2017, Grieb was named the head football coach at Atherton's Sacred Heart Preparatory.

In 2021, Grieb led the SHP Gators to their first state championship title, winning the CIF Division 5A crown. They also won the CCS Division 4 and CIF NorCal 5A titles en route to the state championship.

== Teaching career ==
Grieb briefly taught chemistry at San Mateo High School. Grieb taught chemistry and biology at Gunn High School before departing for Sacred Heart Prep's head football coaching position. Grieb currently works as a chemistry teacher at Sacred Heart Preparatory.

== Head coaching record ==
=== College ===
Year	Team	Overall	Conference	Standing	Bowl/playoffs
Menlo Oaks (NAIA independent) (2013–2014)
2013	Menlo	5–5			
2014	Menlo	3–8			
Menlo:		8–13			
Total:		8–13			

=== High school ===
Year	Team	Overall	Conference	Standing	Bowl/playoffs
Sacred Heart Prep Gators (Peninsula Athletic League) (2017–present)
2017	Sacred Heart Prep	3–7	1–4		
2018	Sacred Heart Prep	11–2	4–1		
2019	Sacred Heart Prep	8–4	3–2		
2020	Sacred Heart Prep	5–1	3–1		
2021	Sacred Heart Prep	8–7	2–3		Nor-Cal 5-A Football Champions
2022	Sacred Heart Prep	11–2	5–0		
2023	Sacred Heart Prep	6–5	3–2		
2024	Sacred Heart Prep	7–7	1–4		
Sacred Heart Prep:		59–35	22–17		
Total:		59–35			
National championship Conference title Conference division title or championship game berth
