= Mike Cawley =

American gridiron football player (born 1972)

No. 5, 10, 12, 14
- Position: Quarterback

Personal information
- Born: August 28, 1972 (age 54); Pittsburgh, Pennsylvania, U.S.

Career information
- College: Syracuse (1991–1992); James Madison (1993–1995)
- NFL draft: 1996: 6th round, 205th overall pick

Career history
- Indianapolis Colts (1996)*; Atlanta Falcons (1996)*; Detroit Lions (1997)*; Orlando Predators (1997)*; Hamilton Tiger-Cats (1997–1998); Buffalo Bills (1999)*; → Amsterdam Admirals (1999); Saskatchewan Roughriders (1999); Buffalo Bills (2000)*; Calgary Stampeders (2000); Las Vegas Outlaws (2001); Quad City Steamwheelers (2002); Buffalo Destroyers (2003)*; La Crosse Night Train (2003)
- * Offseason or practice squad member only

Career CFL statistics
- Pass attempts: 116
- Pass completions: 61
- Passing yards: 762
- Percentage: 52.5
- TD–INT: 6–6

Michael Rodney Cawley (born August 28, 1972) is an American former professional football player who was a quarterback in the Canadian Football League (CFL), NFL Europe and the XFL. He played college football for the James Madison Dukes. He was selected by the Indianapolis Colts of the National Football League (NFL) in the sixth round of the 1996 NFL draft.

== College career ==
Cawley began his collegiate career at Syracuse University, redshirting in 1991 and seeing limited action as a redshirt freshman in 1992. When the NCAA implemented a rule allowing players to transfer from Division I-A to Division I-AA without sitting out a year, Cawley took advantage of the opportunity and transferred to James Madison University ahead of the 1993 season.

He began the 1993 season as a backup to Gary Lyons but quickly claimed the starting quarterback role after the second game. Cawley finished the year with over 2,000 yards of total offense and 20 touchdowns. In 1994, he returned as the Dukes’ starter, leading James Madison to a 10–3 record and a quarterfinal appearance in the I-AA playoffs. That season, Cawley threw for 2,035 yards and 11 passing touchdowns while rushing for 589 yards and 12 touchdowns. He earned third-team All-Yankee Conference honors that season. During his senior season, Cawley guided the Dukes to an 8–4 record and another I-AA playoff berth, throwing for 2,459 yards and 17 touchdowns and adding four rushing touchdowns. He engineered four consecutive fourth-quarter comebacks, helping James Madison achieve a top-ten national ranking. He was named second-team All-Yankee Conference in 1995.

Over his career at James Madison, Cawley set 17 school passing records. Cawley was inducted into the James Madison University Hall of Fame in 2011.

== Professional career ==
=== Indianapolis Colts ===
Cawley was selected by the Indianapolis Colts in the sixth round (205th overall) of the 1996 NFL draft. He was signed to the team's practice squad on August 27, 1996. He was released shortly afterward, on September 11, 1996.

=== Atlanta Falcons ===
Cawley later spent seven weeks on the Atlanta Falcons practice squad during the 1996 season.

=== Detroit Lions ===
Cawley signed with the Detroit Lions on March 4, 1997. He was released on March 25, and the team signed quarterback Matt Blundin two days later.

=== Orlando Predators ===
Cawley signed with the Orlando Predators of the Arena Football League (AFL) for the 1997 season but was placed on the exempt list after signing with the Tiger-Cats. On March 21, 2000, his AFL rights were traded to the Florida Bobcats for Braniff Bonaventure.

=== Hamilton Tiger-Cats ===
Cawley was signed as a free agent by the Hamilton Tiger-Cats on June 1, 1997. He played in eight games for the Ticats in 1997, ranking third on the team with 181 rushing yards. He also threw for 547 yards on 43 of 79 passing attempts, with five touchdowns and four interceptions. During the 1998 season, Cawley saw action in two games, completing five of eight passes for 47 yards. He was released on October 19, 1998.

=== Buffalo Bills / Amsterdam Admirals ===
On January 20, 1999, Cawley signed with the Buffalo Bills. He was allocated to the Amsterdam Admirals of NFL Europe. He began the season as a backup to Dan Gonzalez, but started in Week 4, where he played well and was named Offensive Player of the Week. On the season, he completed 78 of 132 passes for 732 yards and six touchdowns with one interception, while also adding 44 rushing yards and one touchdown. His season was cut short due to a wrist injury. After returning to the United States, he appeared in preseason games for the Bills but was released prior to the regular season.

=== Saskatchewan Roughriders ===
On October 2, 1999, Cawley signed with the Saskatchewan Roughriders. He appeared in two games, completing five of eight passes for 31 yards with two interceptions, before being released on October 16, 1999.

=== Buffalo Bills (second stint) ===
Cawley was signed by the Buffalo Bills on February 17, 2000. He was released during final roster cuts on August 27, 2000.

=== Calgary Stampeders ===
Cawley was signed by the Calgary Stampeders on September 20, 2000. He dressed for seven games, completing 8 of 21 passes for 137 yards and one touchdown, before being released on November 10, 2000.

=== Las Vegas Outlaws ===
Cawley was selected 13th overall by the Las Vegas Outlaws in the XFL supplemental draft on December 29, 2000. The Outlaws’ number one draft pick, Chuck Clements, missed the season due to injury. When Ryan Clement was named the starter, Cawley moved up to primary backup. Despite not playing in week 1, and Jim Ballard taking the final snaps, Cawley made his Outlaws debut the following week when Clement went down with a shoulder injury against the Memphis Maniax. He struggled, completing 3 of 13 passes for 51 yards, but had a key 26-yard completion to wide receiver Nakia Jenkins to set up a touchdown and also ran for an extra point conversion in the 25–3 victory. Cawley made his first start the following week against future XFL champions Los Angeles Xtreme. He completed 14 of 25 passes for 166 yards with one touchdown and two interceptions, and led the team with 34 rushing yards. He threw an interception that led to the game-winning field goal in a 12–9 loss. Following the game, Cawley was released in favor of Mark Grieb.

=== Quad City Steamwheelers ===
Cawley joined the Quad City Steamwheelers of af2 midway through the 2001 season and started all seven of the team’s remaining games. During that stretch, he completed 143 of 262 passes for 1,827 yards, throwing 39 touchdowns against eight interceptions, while also rushing for seven scores. He made his first start against the Memphis Xplorers, passing for 258 yards with four touchdowns and adding two rushing touchdowns. Over his seven starts, Cawley led the Steamwheelers to a 5–2 record, helping the team finish the season strongly.

=== Buffalo Destroyers ===
On December 5, 2002, Cawley signed with the Buffalo Destroyers of the Arena Football League. He was released prior to the start of the season on January 22, 2003.

=== La Crosse Night Train ===
On May 21, 2003, Cawley signed with the La Crosse Night Train of the National Indoor Football League. He appeared in one game for the Night Train before being released; his only appearance came against the Fort Wayne Freedom.

== Career statistics ==
=== Professional ===
==== CFL ====
| Year | Team | Games | | | Passing | | | | | | | | Rushing | | | |
| Year | Team | GD | GS | Record | Cmp | Att | Pct | Yds | Y/A | TD | Int | Rtg | Att | Yds | Avg | TD |
|---|---|---|---|---|---|---|---|---|---|---|---|---|---|---|---|---|
| 1997 | HAM | 8 | 3 | 1–2 | 43 | 79 | 54.4 | 547 | 6.9 | 5 | 4 | 76.3 | 20 | 181 | 9.0 | 0 |
| 1998 | HAM | 16 | 0 | — | 5 | 8 | 62.5 | 47 | 5.9 | 0 | 0 | 78.6 | 2 | 10 | 5.0 | 1 |
| 1999 | SSK | 2 | 0 | — | 5 | 8 | 62.5 | 31 | 3.9 | 0 | 2 | 30.7 | 0 | 0 | 0.0 | 0 |
| 2000 | CGY | 7 | 0 | — | 8 | 21 | 38.1 | 137 | 6.5 | 1 | 0 | 76.9 | 4 | 11 | 2.8 | 0 |
| Career | | 33 | 3 | 1–2 | 61 | 116 | 52.6 | 762 | 6.6 | 6 | 6 | 69.0 | 26 | 202 | 7.8 | 1 |

==== XFL ====
| Year | Team | Games | | | Passing | | | | | | | | Rushing | | | |
| Year | Team | GP | GS | Record | Cmp | Att | Pct | Yds | Y/A | TD | Int | Rtg | Att | Yds | Avg | TD |
|---|---|---|---|---|---|---|---|---|---|---|---|---|---|---|---|---|
| 2001 | LV | 2 | 1 | 0–1 | 17 | 38 | 44.7 | 180 | 4.7 | 1 | 2 | 45.9 | 8 | 41 | 5.1 | 0 |
| Career | | 2 | 1 | 0–1 | 17 | 38 | 44.7 | 180 | 4.7 | 1 | 2 | 45.9 | 8 | 41 | 5.1 | 0 |

==== AF2 ====
| Year | Team | Games | | | Passing | | | | | | | | Rushing | | | |
| Year | Team | GP | GS | Record | Cmp | Att | Pct | Yds | Y/A | TD | Int | Rtg | Att | Yds | Avg | TD |
|---|---|---|---|---|---|---|---|---|---|---|---|---|---|---|---|---|
| 2002 | QC | 7 | 7 | 5–2 | 143 | 262 | 54.6 | 1,827 | 7.0 | 39 | 8 | 101.1 | 29 | 66 | 2.3 | 7 |
| Career | | 7 | 7 | 5–2 | 143 | 262 | 54.6 | 1,827 | 7.0 | 39 | 8 | 101.1 | 29 | 66 | 2.3 | 7 |

==== NIFL ====
| Year | Team | Games | | | Passing | | | | | | | | Rushing | | | |
| Year | Team | GP | GS | Record | Cmp | Att | Pct | Yds | Y/A | TD | Int | Rtg | Att | Yds | Avg | TD |
|---|---|---|---|---|---|---|---|---|---|---|---|---|---|---|---|---|
| 2003 | LaC | 1 | 0 | — | 2 | 9 | 22.2 | 17 | 1.9 | 0 | 2 | 0.0 | 1 | 7 | 7.0 | 0 |
| Career | | 1 | 0 | 0–0 | 2 | 9 | 22.2 | 17 | 1.9 | 0 | 2 | 0.0 | 1 | 7 | 7.0 | 0 |

==== College ====
| Season | Team | Games | | | Passing | | | | | | | | Rushing | | | |
| Season | Team | GP | GS | Record | Cmp | Att | Pct | Yds | Y/A | TD | Int | Rtg | Att | Yds | Avg | TD |
|---|---|---|---|---|---|---|---|---|---|---|---|---|---|---|---|---|
| 1991 | Syracuse | 0 | 0 | — | Redshirted (redshirt) | | | | | | | | | | | |
| 1992 | Syracuse | 1 | 0 | — | Did not record passing statistics | | | | | | | | 1 | –2 | –2.0 | 0 |
| 1993 | James Madison | 10 | 9 | 5–4 | 131 | 239 | 54.8 | 1,988 | 8.3 | 14 | 11 | 134.8 | ? | 108 | ? | 6 |
| 1994 | James Madison | 13 | 13 | 10–3 | 152 | 263 | 57.8 | 2,035 | 7.7 | 11 | 8 | 130.5 | ? | 589 | ? | 12 |
| 1995 | James Madison | 12 | 12 | 8–4 | 196 | 361 | 54.3 | 2,459 | 6.8 | 17 | 11 | 121.0 | 99 | 70 | 0.7 | 4 |
| Career | | 36 | 34 | 23–11 | 479 | 863 | 55.5 | 6,482 | 7.5 | 42 | 30 | 127.7 | ? | 765 | ? | 22 |

== Personal life ==
Cawley is married to Katie Schumacher-Cawley, the head volleyball coach at Penn State. Together, they have three daughters.
