= Toran James =

American football player (born 1974)

No. 59, 50, 48
- Positions: Fullback, linebacker

Personal information
- Born: March 8, 1974 (age 52); Richmond, Virginia, U.S.
- Listed height: 6 ft 3 in (1.91 m)
- Listed weight: 249 lb (113 kg)

Career information
- High school: Hertford County High
- College: North Carolina A&T
- NFL draft: 1997: 7th round, 218th overall pick

Career history
- San Diego Chargers (1997); Seattle Seahawks (1998); Green Bay Packers (1999)*; Seattle Seahawks (1999)*; New Jersey Red Dogs (2000); Las Vegas Outlaws (2001); Detroit Fury (2001–2002); Columbus Destroyers (2005)*
- * Offseason or practice squad member only

Career NFL statistics
- Tackles: 6
- Stats at Pro Football Reference

Career AFL statistics
- Tackles: 13
- Interceptions: 1
- Passes defended: 3
- Stats at ArenaFan.com

Toran James (born March 8, 1974) is an American former professional football player who was a linebacker in the National Football League for the San Diego Chargers, Seattle Seahawks. He played college football for the North Carolina A&T Aggies. He also played professionally for the Las Vegas Outlaws of the defunct XFL. He grew up in Ahoskie, North Carolina

== High school ==
Toran's first high school was General H.H. Arnold High School in Wiesbaden, Germany. During his freshman year (88'-89') he helped lead the junior varsity "Warriors" football team to an undefeated season. He played on the varsity squad the next two years before moving back to the U.S., where he lettered as a defensive end for the Hertford County High Bears in Ahoskie, North Carolina.

== College career ==
James attended North Carolina A&T State University. In his freshman year with the Aggies, he was named conference rookie of the year in 1992. He finished his collegiate career with 175 tackles and 14 sacks. Toran played linebacker as well as defensive end. In 1995, he was granted a medical redshirt due to knee surgery. He majored in history.

== Professional career ==
Toran was selected by the San Diego Chargers in the seventh round of the 1997 NFL draft. Toran was a backup linebacker behind Kurt Gouveia and special teams contributor and saw action in 14 games. Toran suffered a knee injury during mid season and missed weeks 9 and 10. He finished the season with 7 tackles. In 1998, he was released by the Chargers during the preseason. In 1999, he was signed by the Seattle Seahawks, again he was released during preseason. In the same year he was signed by the Green Bay Packers but again was released. In 2000, James was drafted by the Las Vegas Outlaws with pick number 85 of the XFL draft. James made a huge impact by his stellar pre-season game against the Memphis Maniax During the 2001 season he recorded 12 tackles. In 2000, James was a member of the Carolina Cobras. After the XFL folded, James signed with the Detroit Fury of the Arena Football League. He was a member of the team for the 2001 and 2002 seasons. On January 11, 2005, Toran James was signed by the Columbus Destroyers by was later released during camp.
