= Keith Jennings (American football) =

American football player (born 1966)

No. 84, 80, 85
- Position: Tight end

Personal information
- Born: May 19, 1966 (age 60); Summerville, South Carolina, U.S.
- Listed height: 6 ft 4 in (1.93 m)
- Listed weight: 262 lb (119 kg)

Career information
- High school: Summerville
- College: Clemson
- NFL draft: 1989: 5th round, 113th overall pick

Career history
- Dallas Cowboys (1989); Montreal Machine (1991); Denver Broncos (1991)*; Chicago Bears (1991–1997); Detroit Lions (1998)*; Las Vegas Outlaws (2001)
- * Offseason or practice squad member only

Career NFL statistics
- Receptions: 107
- Receiving yards: 1,082
- Touchdowns: 10
- Stats at Pro Football Reference

Keith O'Neal Jennings (born May 19, 1966) is an American former professional football player who was a tight end in the National Football League (NFL) for the Dallas Cowboys and Chicago Bears. He also was a member of the Las Vegas Outlaws in the XFL. He played college football for the Clemson Tigers.

== Early life ==
Jennings attended Summerville High School, where he was a high school All-American and an All-State wide receiver, while helping his team win three division AAAA state championships. He posted 85 receptions for 1,760 yards (20.7 avg.) and 17 touchdowns in his final two seasons.

He also was an All-state first baseman, contributing to the school winning two baseball state titles.

== College career ==
Jennings accepted a football scholarship from Clemson University. As a freshman, he was a backup wide receiver and his best game came in the 1985 Independence Bowl against the University of Minnesota, where he had 3 receptions for 41 yards, including his first career touchdown.

He became a starter as a junior and was considered at the time the biggest wide receiver in school history. Playing in run-oriented offenses, he excelled at blocking, after the game against the University of Maryland head coach Danny Ford said "Keith is the best blocking wide receiver I've ever seen". He was second on the team with 31 receptions and 475 receiving yards. His best regular season game came against North Carolina State University, when he had 6 receptions for 84 yards. In the 1988 Florida Citrus Bowl, he posted 7 receptions for a school-bowl record 110 yards against Penn State University. The 7 receptions were the most by a Tiger player since 1981.

As a senior, he led the team with 30 receptions and 397 receiving yards, while also collecting one receiving touchdown. He helped the Tigers win a third straight Atlantic Coast Conference championship.

He finished his career with 78 receptions (eighth in school history) for 1,117 yards (ninth in school history) and 2 touchdowns. During his time in college, his teams had a 34-12-2 record and appeared in 4 bowl games.

== Professional career ==
=== Dallas Cowboys ===
Jennings was selected by the Dallas Cowboys in the fifth round (113th overall) of the 1989 NFL draft, with the intention of converting him into a tight end, even though he didn't have any previous experience at that position. He was released on September 4 and signed to the team's practice squad.

He was promoted to the active roster before the seventh game and went on to appear in 10 games. He played mainly on special teams and as a second tight end in short yardage situations. Against the Green Bay Packers he had 4 receptions for 37 yards. He was waived injured on September 2, 1990.

=== Montreal Machine ===
In 1991, he signed with the Montreal Machine of the World League of American Football. He was a backup tight end behind K. D. Dunn, tallying 4 receptions for 54 yards and one touchdown.

=== Denver Broncos ===
On July 3, 1991, he was signed as a free agent by the Denver Broncos. He was released on August 26, 1991.

=== Chicago Bears ===
On October 9, 1991, Jennings was signed as a free agent to replace Cap Boso who had suffered a career-ending knee injury. In 1992, he developed into a blocking tight end and was named the starter in place of James Thornton, who was placed on the injured reserve list on September 1.

He was released on August 28, 1994. On October 24, he was re-signed after starter Chris Gedney was lost for the season.

In 1995, he recorded the most touchdowns by a Bears tight end (6) since Mike Ditka's finished with 8 in 1963. The following season, he was placed on the injured reserve list with a broken left leg, after the sixth game of the season. He was waived injured on December 10, 1997.

=== Detroit Lions ===
On August 4, 1998, he signed with the Detroit Lions, before being waived on August 30.

=== Las Vegas Outlaws ===
On January 9, 2001, he was signed by the Las Vegas Outlaws of the XFL. He served as a third-string tight end behind Rickey Brady and didn't record any stats. The league ceased operations in May 2001.

== Post-playing career ==
In 2017, Jennings was an undergraduate tight ends coach under Dabo Swinney at Clemson University. Also in 2017, he served as a scouting intern with the Buffalo Bills during training camp and preseason under the NFL Nunn-Wooten Scouting Fellowship. On June 11, 2018, he was hired as the Buffalo Bills BLESTO college scout. On May 17, 2024, Jennings was promoted to the role of area scout.

== Personal life ==
His older brother Stanford Jennings played running back for the Cincinnati Bengals of the National Football League. His cousin Antonio Anderson played defensive tackle in the National Football League.
