= Ryan Clement =

American football player (born 1975)

No. 16, 17, 19
- Position: Quarterback

Personal information
- Born: October 25, 1975 (age 51); Denver, Colorado, U.S.
- Listed height: 6 ft 2 in (1.88 m)
- Listed weight: 230 lb (104 kg)

Career information
- High school: Mullen (Denver, Colorado)
- College: Miami (FL)
- NFL draft: 1998: undrafted

Career history
- Scottish Claymores (1999); Orlando Predators (2000)*; Las Vegas Outlaws (2001); Colorado Ice (2007–2009)
- * Offseason or practice squad member only

Ryan Clement (born October 25, 1975) is an American former football quarterback. He played college for the Miami Hurricanes and professionally in NFL Europe, XFL, United Indoor Football and the Indoor Football League.

== Early life ==
Clement attended Mullen High School in Denver, Colorado, lettering in football, basketball, and baseball. He was the Mustangs' starting quarterback from the first game of his freshman year through his senior season and was a Colorado All-State football selection four years in a row. Clement was selected to receive the Denver Post Gold Helmet Award presented to the state's top football athlete/scholar/citizen for the 1993/1994 school year. He was also selected as a Parade magazine All-American his senior year.

== College career ==
After graduating in 1994, Clement went on to attend the University of Miami, a college football powerhouse who had been hurt by NCAA sanctions.

With the Hurricanes, Clement would split the starting quarterback role in 1995 with Ryan Collins. Clement replaced Collins in the third game of the 1995 season against Virginia Tech when Collins was sidelined with an injury. Clement started the remaining 8 games, losing his first start to Florida State but finishing the season with 7 wins in a row. After a slow start in 1995, going 1-3 before finishing the season at 8-3, Miami would still have participated in a post-season bowl because of its strong finish. Miami, however, was ineligible for bowl game participation due to NCAA sanctions. This was Butch Davis's first year as Head Coach of the Hurricanes.

Clement took over the starting role full-time in 1996, leading the Big East in pass efficiency with a 147.1 rating. Clement was a leading candidate for the Davey O’Brien National Quarterback Award in 1996 and was also an All-Big East Conference selection. He led the Hurricanes to the Big East title shared with Virginia Tech and Syracuse (all finished 6-1 in conference play) with an impressive performance in the final game of the season at Syracuse. Clement threw for three touchdowns to help Miami defeat the Donovan McNabb led Orangemen 38-31, earning Big East “Player of the Week” honors and giving Miami a share of the Big East conference crown. Miami finished the 1996 season 9-3, with a win over Virginia in the Carquest Bowl and ranked 14th in both the AP and coaches polls.

1997 proved to be an extremely difficult year for Clement and the Hurricanes. Miami, beset by the scholarship reductions due to NCAA violations under the Dennis Erickson tenure, and forced to play several true freshmen as starters in key positions, fell to a 5-6 record, their first losing record since 1979.

Clement led the Miami Hurricanes in 30 regular season games as the starting quarterback over three seasons, and led his team to a win in the 1996 Carquest Bowl in the only post-season game he started. He received the Walter Kichefski Football Award, selected by his coaches as the Miami player that most represents the characteristics Kichefski lived by: respect for fellow man, loyalty, dedication, sacrifice, motivation and inspiration.

=== Statistics ===
Season	Team	Games (Note: Clement’s statistics from his bowl game appearances are excluded, as bowl game statistics were not officially counted toward season or career totals prior to 2002.)			Passing								Rushing			
Season	Team	GP	GS	Record	Cmp	Att	Pct	Yds	Y/A	TD	Int	Rtg	Att	Yds	Avg	TD
1994	Miami	6	0	—	3	7	42.9	20	2.9	0	0	66.9	0	0	0.0	0
1995	Miami	10	8	7–1	119	201	59.2	1,638	8.1	7	10	129.2	36	–76	–2.1	1
1996	Miami	11	11	8–3	148	246	60.2	1,983	8.1	18	6	147.1	30	–117	–3.9	1
1997	Miami	11	11	5–6	157	267	58.8	2,089	7.8	10	11	128.6	44	–120	–2.7	3
Career		38	30	20–10	427	721	59.2	5,730	7.9	35	27	134.5	110	–313	–2.8	5

Clement finished his career at Miami among the all-time statistical leaders in the following categories:

- Career Pass Completion Percentage:(Minimum 250 Attempts) - (443 of 747) - 59.3% (4th All-Time),
- Career Pass Completions: 443 (4th All-Time),
- Career Pass Attempts: 747 (4th All-Time),
- Career Passing Yardage: 6,004 (5th All-Time),
- Career Total Offense: 5,659 (5th All-Time),
- Career Touchdown Passes: 43 (6th All-Time).

He also owns two individual season marks for Pass Completion Percentage for the 1996 season of 60.3% (164 of 272) (6th All-Time) and for the 1995 season of 59.2% (199 of 201) (10th All-Time)

== Professional career ==
=== Scottish Claymores ===
On February 10, 1999, Clement signed with the Orlando Predators of the Arena Football League. However, he later signed with and played for the Scottish Claymores of NFL Europe under head coach Jim Criner in 1999. With the Claymores, he was the primary backup to starting quarterback Dameyune Craig and appeared in limited action, completing one of two passes for ten yards.

=== Las Vegas Outlaws ===
On October 30, 2000, Clement was signed by the Las Vegas Outlaws of the XFL as the 284th overall pick in the 2001 XFL draft. He rejoined head coach Jim Criner, who had also coached him with the Claymores. Due to an injury to first-round draft pick Chuck Clements, Clement won the starting job over Mike Cawley and Jim Ballard. He started in the XFL's kickoff game, a nationally televised contest on NBC, throwing for 188 yards and two touchdowns in the Outlaws' victory over the NY/NJ Hitmen. The following week, he suffered a serious injury late in the first quarter against the Memphis Maniax when defensive end Shante Carver was penalized for a late hit that caused a third-degree separation of Clement's right (throwing) shoulder. Clement returned four weeks later in Week 6 against the Orlando Rage. With the quarterback situation different—Cawley had been released and starter Mark Grieb was playing—Clement regained the starting role, completing 20 of 30 passes for 159 yards with one touchdown and one interception in a 27–15 loss. The following week, he led the Outlaws to a decisive 34–12 victory over Birmingham, completing 13 of 22 passes for 104 yards with three touchdowns and one interception. In Week 8 against the Los Angeles Xtreme, he went 17 of 31 for 192 yards with three touchdowns and one interception in a 35–26 road loss. In Week 9 against the San Francisco Demons, Clement was injured after a fourth-quarter late hit by linebacker Jon Haskins, who was ejected from the game. In Week 10, he briefly relieved an ineffective Grieb but was replaced after just three pass attempts. Clement finished the season appearing in seven games, starting six, with a 3–3 record as the starter. He completed 78 of 138 passes for 805 yards with nine touchdowns and four interceptions. He also punted twice for 74 yards, referencing his 1994 college season at Miami, where he punted eight times.

Since the XFL, Clement returned to Denver. A political science major at Miami who also earned a J.D. degree, he has worked as counsel for a Denver lobbying firm. He also talked of a comeback to football, in the newly formed All American Football League.

=== Colorado Ice ===
In 2007, Clement signed with the Colorado Ice of the United Indoor Football. He appeared in eight games, completing 61 of 125 passes for 668 yards with ten touchdowns and eight interceptions, while adding one rushing touchdown. During the 2008 season, Clement appeared in five games, completing 48 of 81 passes for 584 yards with 11 touchdowns and three interceptions, while adding three rushing touchdowns. He resigned midway through the season on April 16, 2008, and was later released on June 6. Clement returned to the Ice in 2009, after the team joined the Indoor Football League. He appeared in one game, completing 8 of 22 passes for 75 yards with one touchdown and four interceptions.

=== Statistics ===
XFL

Year	Team	Games			Passing								Rushing			
Year	Team	GP	GS	Record	Cmp	Att	Pct	Yds	Y/A	TD	Int	Rtg	Att	Yds	Avg	TD
2001	LV	7	6	3–3	78	138	56.5	805	5.8	9	4	83.2	10	19	1.9	0
Career		7	6	3–3	78	138	56.5	805	5.8	9	4	83.2	10	19	1.9	0

UIF/IFL

Season	Team	League	Games	Passing								Rushing			
Season	Team	League	GP	Cmp	Att	Pct	Yds	Y/A	TD	Int	Rtg	Att	Yds	Avg	TD
2007	COL	UIF	8	61	125	48.8	668	5.3	10	8	58.4	15	29	1.9	1
2008	COL	UIF	5	48	81	59.3	584	7.2	11	3	105.7	14	–11	–0.8	3
2009	COL	IFL	1	8	22	36.4	75	3.4	1	4	18.4	0	0	0.0	0
Career			14	117	228	51.3	1,327	5.8	22	15	65.8	29	18	0.6	4
