= Joe Clements (American football) =

American football player and coach (1936–2015)

No. 24
- Positions: Quarterback, defensive back, kick returner
- Class: 1958

Personal information
- Born: July 14, 1936; Nacogdoches, Texas, U.S.
- Died: April 4, 2014 (aged 77); Huntsville, Texas, U.S.
- Listed height: 6 ft 3 in (1.91 m)
- Listed weight: 180 lb (82 kg)

Career information
- High school: Huntsville
- College: Texas (1955–1957)

Awards and highlights
- Texas High School Hall of Fame inductee (2010)

Joseph Stuart Clements (July 14, 1936 – May 4, 2015) was an American football player and coach. As head football coach of at Huntsville High School in Huntsville, Texas from 1975 to 1994, he became the only person to lead a single Texas high school to the state championship as both a quarterback and a coach. He was the starting quarterback for the University of Texas Longhorns from 1955 to 1956. Clements died on Monday, May 4, 2015.

== Early life ==
As a high school quarterback, Clements led Huntsville to the 1953 AA Texas State Championship. With him as quarterback, Huntsville went 28–1 over the 1952–53 seasons. He was a top recruit coming out of high school, and chose to go to Texas, where his father Otto had been a two-time all-Southwest Conference baseball player.

== College football ==
Clements started his sophomore year at Texas as the back-up quarterback to Walter Fondren. But, in the second game of the year, he replaced an ineffective Fondren and had the best game of his career. He threw for 215 yards and three touchdowns in the game, becoming the second Longhorn to ever throw for more than 200 yards in a single game and tying the school record for touchdown passes in a game. Going into the next game, he was the nation's leading passer. He started every game for Texas for the next two years. Against USC the following week, he was knocked out in the first five minutes and replaced by Walter Fondren and third-string quarterback Dick Miller. Texas went on to post a 5–5 record with losses to number 8 USC, number 3 Oklahoma and number 7 TCU, but finished the season on an up-note when they upset rival number 8 Texas A&M. That year, he led the Southwest Conference in interceptions.

Clements remained the starter in 1956 and he led the Southwest Conference in passes completed, completion percentage and interceptions. Despite his success, the Longhorns had one of the program's worst seasons, going 1–9 for its worst record since 1938. For the rest of the 20th century, they would never fail to win at least four games in a year. With the exception of the first game against USC, when Vince Matthews replaced him after he suffered a concussion, Clements would be the primary quarterback all season. The team's only win was a 7–6 squeaker against Tulane – won by a blocked extra point. Furthermore, the team was shut out twice for the first time since 1938. They were beaten by number 1 Oklahoma in a 45–0 rout and later in the season by TCU, 46–0. He finished 7th in the nation in Passing Completions and Completion Percentage in 1956.

After the 1956 season, Coach Ed Price was fired. Darrell Royal was hired to replace him and Royal replaced the pocket pass-oriented offense that Clements did well in with the split-T option that played more to the strengths of Fondren. Clements fell down the depth chart and as a result only saw limited action in four games during his senior season.

He finished with a 5–13 record as a starting quarterback at Texas.

=== Records ===
- UT – Most passes attempted, game (31), surpassed by Rick McIvor in 1981
- UT – Most passes completed, game (17), tied his own record, surpassed by Bret Stafford in 1986
- UT – Most passes had intercepted, season (16), surpassed by Todd Dodge in 1984

== Coaching ==
Upon graduation, Clements began a career as a high school football coach and history teacher. He started at Robert E. Lee High School in Houston in 1967 where his team won what was known as the city championship in 1971. In 1972 he became the Head Coach and Athletic Director at King High School in Kingsville.

In 1975 he became the head coach at his alma mater, Huntsville. During his 19 years in Huntsville, he guided the Hornets to 14 playoff seasons, won the 1980 state title and never had a losing record. In 1981 he was chosen as 4A Coach of the Year by the Texas Sports Writers Association. He finished his 27-year head coaching career with a record of 221–77–6. After his retirement, he took several Texas All-Star teams to Australia for the annual Down Under Bowl which he won each time.

Among others, Clements was the coach of filmmaker Richard Linklater and was the basis for the football coach in the 1993 movie Dazed and Confused.

He received many coaching honors over the years. He was selected as one of six coaches by the Houston Chronicle as Coach of the Decade for the 1980's; honored as a charter member in the initial class of inductees to the Greater Houston Area Coaches Association Hall of Honor in 1992; had Huntsville High School Fieldhouse named after him on August 29, 2004; received the Huntsville-Walker County Chamber of Commerce Mance Park Lifetime Achievement Award in 2008; was an initial inductee into the Huntsville High School Hall of Honor in 2009, and was inducted into the Texas High School Sports Hall of Fame in 2010 for his contributions as a player.

== Later life ==
Clements married a former University of Texas cheerleader. Clements and his wife had a daughter and three sons. All three sons played football, two of whom later played professional football.

Steve was the starting quarterback at Huntsville, where he became Texas's high school player of the year, and the state's all-time leading high school passer, surpassing the record set by Ty Detmer. After originally attending Texas, he transferred to BYU when he was unhappy with his place on the depth chart. He played in the CFL and AFL before becoming a high school football coach.

Chuck went to the University of Houston and later played several years in the NFL.
