= Arkansas Stars =

American indoor football team

Logo

General information
- Founded: 2006
- Folded: 2007
- Headquartered: Fayetteville, Arkansas at the Randal Tyson Track Center
- Colors: Black, Maroon, White

Team history
- Arkansas Stars (2006)

Home fields
- Randal Tyson Track Center (2006)

League / conference affiliations
- National Indoor Football League (2006): Pacific Conference (2006); Southern Division (2006)

The Arkansas Stars were a professional Indoor football team based out of Fayetteville, Arkansas, United States. They would play their home games at Randal Tyson Track Center on the University of Arkansas campus. The team was a 2006 expansion member of the National Indoor Football League.

Notable players include receiver Darrian Chestnut and defensive tackle Chris Charles (who weighs 467 pounds). Also, their clutch kicker Stephen Arnold. Arnold joined the team after three games and made an immediate impact by nailing the game winning extra point in overtime of his first game to give the Stars their first franchise win.

The team had announced their move into the United Indoor Football in 2007, then were linked to the NAIFL, when the UIF and NAIFL announced their merger. When the NAIFL decided not to begin operations, Stars management announced that they would join the UIF and would play in 2007.

== Season-by-season ==
Season records
| Season | W | L | T | Finish | Playoff results |
|---|---|---|---|---|---|
Arkansas Stars (NIFL)
| 2006 | 6 | 8 | 0 | 3rd Pacific Southern | -- |

== Notable players ==
- Chrys Chukwuma- Running back
