= Randal Tyson Track Center =

Sports venue in Fayetteville, Arkansas

- The World's Fastest Track
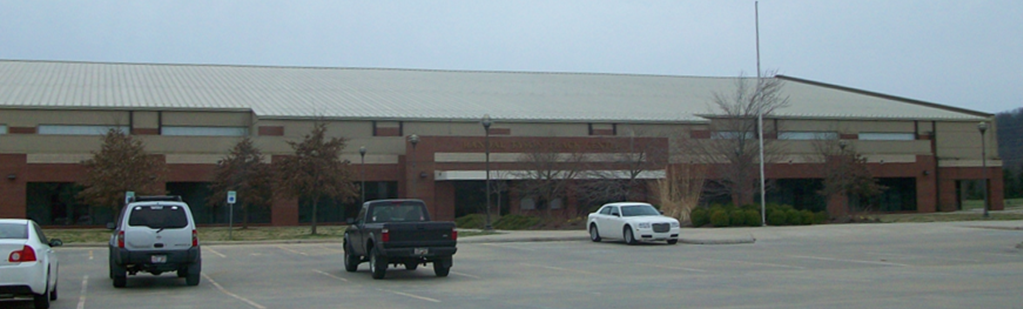
- Randall Tyson
- Interactive map of Randal Tyson Track Center
- Location: 1380 S Beechwood Ave. Fayetteville, Arkansas 72701
- Coordinates: 36°02′59″N 94°11′04″W
- Owner: University of Arkansas
- Capacity: 5,500
- Surface: Mondo Super X

Construction
- Opened: 2000
- Cost: approx. $7 Million

Tenants
- University of Arkansas Track (NCAA) (2000–present); Arkansas Stars (NIFL) (2006)

The Randal Tyson Track Center is a 5,500-seat indoor track in Fayetteville, Arkansas. Built in 2000, it is home to the University of Arkansas Razorbacks track and field teams. It was also home for one year to the semi-pro Arkansas Stars. The facility is located behind the first base stands of Baum Stadium, home of the Razorback baseball team. The baseball and indoor track facilities are one-half mile south of the main University of Arkansas campus, across Razorback Road (Arkansas Highway 112).

The Track Center is home to the Arkansas Razorback Track Program that has earned 42 National NCAA Track & Field Championships, although two were stripped from the University due to NCAA sanctions. The Center has hosted several national events including the Tyson Track & Field Invitational, NCAA Division I Indoor Track & Field Championships.

The Randal Tyson Track Center was the vision of former head coach John McDonnell and Athletics Director Frank Broyles. McDonnell presented a gold NCAA Championship watch to Tyson Foods CEO Don Tyson in hopes of persuading him to partially fund the project. The Tyson family donated $3 million to the project. The cost of construction is estimated at around $7 million.

Designed by a Fayetteville architecture firm, the facility was opened in 2000 and dedicated on February 12 of the same year. During the first year (2000) the facility hosted the Tyson Invitational, a meet on the USATF Golden Spike Tour (now the VISA Championship Series), the Southeastern Conference Championships, and the NCAA Indoor Championships. Since that time the facility has been the annual host of the Tyson Invitational and has been the host the NCAA Indoor Championships every year until 2009. Due to Arkansas's successful bid to host the 2009 NCAA Outdoor Championships, the Indoor Championships were awarded to Texas A&M so that Arkansas would not host both the indoor and outdoor national championships in the same year. The University of Arkansas resumed hosting in 2010 and was the event site in 2011, 2013 and 2015.

== Features ==
The 106,000-square-foot (9,800 m^{2}) building houses a 200-meter oval with banked turns. The track surface is Red and Grey Mondo Super X. There is a 60-meter straight in the center of the oval. Inside the oval there are shot put areas, high jump areas, and elevated horizontal jumping and pole vault runways. A new 36-foot (11 m) by 20-foot (6.1 m) video scoreboard was installed in 2005. There is also a 8,500-square-foot (790 m^{2}) warm up area (commonly called "The Green Room", because of the green colored Mondo surface) with restrooms for the athletes in the south wing of the venue. In 2009, the Green Room was modified to become a weight room for the track and field programs.

The track itself has a unique history as it is the same one used in the 1993 IAAF World Indoor Championships in Toronto, Canada. Following the end of the international event, the track was disassembled and then stored until the Arkansas athletic department purchased the track and brought it to Fayetteville in 1999. More than 20 years after it was first constructed it is still widely regarded as the fastest indoor track ever built.

=== Recent renovations ===
During the first decade of operation, the track is taken apart and stored in a building directly behind the center at the end of the collegiate indoor track season. During that time the Tyson Center played host to concerts, sporting events and trade shows. Yearly, engineers from Mondo would work with University personnel to reassemble and maintenance the track. In 2011 the track was resurfaced—it remains Mondo Super X, which was the original material used for the 1993 World Championships and the original surface used when the track was installed at the University of Arkansas. During the resurfacing process, the University worked closely with Mondo to insure the integrity and performance of the track lived up to its reputation as one of fastest indoor tracks ever built. The decision was made at that time to make the track a semi-permanent fixture (being able to be removed if necessary, but otherwise remaining in place year around), making maintenance easier, preserving the integrity of the competition surface and allowing athletes year around access to train. The University of Arkansas' assistant AD of facilities said at the time, "The track's reputation as one of the fastest indoor tracks in the world was at the forefront of our decision to revitalize it instead of installing a new one. But we needed to ensure that any improvements we made kept the track's integrity intact. The track has such a history and such a strong reputation that we felt like it was in the best interest of NCAA track and field and Arkansas track and field."

In 2014, construction of the 52,000 sq ft Fowler Family Baseball and Track Training Center was completed. The facility provides a climate-controlled practice space, an expansive check in and warm up area for track meets and will allow all indoor meet throwing events to be held on site, as they were previously held across campus at the Walker Pavilion (Arkansas' indoor football field). The Tyson Center front lobby was renovated to add a display area for Arkansas' Track and Field NCAA trophies and updated ticket offices.

== Top times ==
The Tyson Center is widely considered one of the premiere track and field facilities in the United States. Several Collegiate (CR), American (AR), American Jr. (AJR), World Jr. (WJR) and World (WR) records have been set there.

Event	Name, Affiliation, Year	Mark
Women's 60 Meters	Bianca Knight, Texas, 2008	7.16 (AJR)
Men's 60 Meter Hurdles	Omar McLeod, Arkansas, 2015	7.45 (CR)
Women's 60 Meter Hurdles	Dior Hall, South Carolina, 2015	8.01 (WJR)
Men's 200 Meters	Wallace Spearmon, Jr., Arkansas, 2005 Walter Dix, Florida State, 2005	20.10 (AR, CR) 20.37 (WJR, AJR)
Women's 200 Meters	Bianca Knight, Texas, 2008	22.40 (CR, WJR, AJR)
Men's 300 Meters	Wallace Spearmon, Jr., Nike, 2006	31.88 (Non-altitude WR, AR)
Men's 400 Meters	Kerron Clement, Florida, 2005 Kirani James, Alabama, 2011 LaShawn Merritt, East Carolina, 2005	44.57 (WR, CR, AR) 44.80 (WJR) 44.93 (AJR)
Women's 400 Meters	Francena McCorory, Hampton, 2010 Sanya Richards-Ross, Texas, 2004	50.54 (CR) 50.82 (AJR, WJR)
Women's 800 Meters	Nicole Cook, Tennessee, 2005 Meskerem Legesse, Oregon, 2004	2:00.75 (CR) 2:01.03 (WJR)
Men's 1500 Meters	Bernard Lagat, Nike, 2005	3:33.34 (AR)
Men's Mile	Bernard Lagat, Nike, 2005	3:49.89 (AR)
Men's 3000 Meters	Alistair Cragg, Arkansas, 2004	7:38.59 (CR)
Women's 3000 Meters	Elise Cranny, Stanford, 2015	8:58.88 (AJR)
Men's 5000 Meters	Galen Rupp, Oregon, 2009	13:18.12 (AR, CR)
Women's 5000 Meters	Kim Smith, Providence, 2004	15:14.18 (CR)
Men's Distance Medley Relay	Texas, 2008	9:25.97 (WR, CR, AR)
Men's 4x400 Relay	USA (Clement, Spearmon, Williamson, Wariner), 2006 Texas A&M, 2005 Texas A&M, 2017	3:01.96 (Non-ratified WR) 3:02.86 (CR) 3:02.52 (pending ratification)
Women's 4x400 Relay	Texas, 2003	3:27.66 (CR)
Men's Pole Vault	Shawn Barber, Akron, 2015	5.91m (CR)
Women's Pole Vault	Natalie Willer, Nebraska, 2009	4.35m (AJR)
Women's Long Jump	Elva Goulbourne, Auburn, 2002	6.91m (CR)
Men's Shot Put	Ryan Whiting, Arizona State, 2008	21.73m (CR)
Women's Shot Put	Jill Camerena-Williams, NYAC, 2012 Raven Saunders, So. Illinois, 2015	20.21m (AR) 18.62m (AJR)
Men's Heptathlon	Ashton Eaton, Oregon, 2010 Gunnar Nixon, Arkansas, 2012	6499 points (CR) 6022 points (WJR, AJR)

*Both the Men's and Women's Collegiate Weight Throw records (Walter Henning, 22.02 (2008, also the AJR) and Brittney Riley, 25.56m, 2007) were set in Fayetteville, however, the records occurred at Walker Pavilion across campus, not at the Randal Tyson Center.
