= Las Vegas Outlaws (XFL) =

American football team in the XFL

Logo

General information
- Founded: 2001
- Folded: 2001; 25 years ago
- Stadium: Sam Boyd Stadium
- Headquartered: Whitney, Nevada
- Colors: Red, black, sand

Personnel
- Head coach: Jim Criner

League / conference affiliations
- XFL; Western Division

The Las Vegas Outlaws were an American football team in the XFL. They played in the Western Division with the Los Angeles Xtreme, San Francisco Demons and Memphis Maniax. They played their home games at Sam Boyd Stadium. On February 3, 2001, The Outlaws hosted the first nationally televised XFL game on NBC against the New York/New Jersey Hitmen.

== History ==
Before the 2001 season began there was already question if Las Vegas could support a professional sports team due to past failed attempts with: Las Vegas Americans (Soccer-MISL- 1984-85), Las Vegas Dustdevils (Soccer-CISL-1994-1995), Las Vegas Posse (Football-CFL-1994) Las Vegas Quicksilvers (Soccer-NASL-1976-1978), Las Vegas Seagulls (Soccer-ASL-1979), Las Vegas Sting (Football-Arena Football League-1994-1995) and Las Vegas Thunder (IHL-1993-1999) The Outlaws were sponsored by Cox Communications, New York-New York Hotel & Casino, Station Casinos, PacifiCare Health Systems and Findlay Toyota. Just like the Posse (and the later Locomotives), the Outlaws had a difficult time selling tickets. For the home opener against the Hitmen 13,700 tickets were sold for a stadium that seats 36,000. There were only 7,000 estimated season ticket holders. Compared to the rest of the league, the Outlaws' attendance was about average, at 22,000 fans per game. They were one of two teams (the league-leading San Francisco Demons being the other) to consistently play in a stadium that was more than half full. The league-leading defense, led by Defensive Coordinator Mark Criner, was nicknamed "The Dealers of Doom."

== Players ==
Among the team's players were the XFL's most well-known, Rod Smart (later with the National Football League's Philadelphia Eagles, Carolina Panthers, and the Oakland Raiders), who went by the nickname of "He Hate Me", which appeared on the back of his jersey. (He was originally going to put "They Hate Me", but there wasn't enough room.) Coached by former Boise State and Scottish Claymores head coach Jim Criner, the Outlaws competed in the XFL's only season, held in the spring of 2001. The team encouraged their fans to come up with a nickname. They selected the "Dealers of Doom Defense". After a strong start, the Outlaws suffered repeated injuries to their quarterbacks (by the midpoint of the season they were on their fourth-string quarterback) and lost their last three games to finish in last place in the division with a record of 4-6-0, just one game out of a playoff spot.

Despite having a two-year contract, NBC announced shortly after the season that it was getting out, as the season's later games had garnered the lowest ratings for a major American television network since the Nielsen ratings had begun tracking them, and the league folded shortly afterwards.

The team was the centerpiece of the 2003 book about the XFL, Long Bomb: How the XFL Became TV's Biggest Fiasco. It was written by Brett Forrest of Details magazine.

=== Notable Las Vegas Outlaws players ===
- 87 Werner (Verne) Hippler, a German-born tight end who played 11 years in the NFL Europe League and has also been on the practice squads of the San Diego Chargers and Detroit Lions.
- 10 Mike Cawley (James Madison) - The quarterback played in the NFL for five seasons with four teams, a season in the CFL with two teams, a season in NFLE with the Amsterdam Admirals, and one year with the Af2 Quad City Steamwheelers.
- 81 Todd Floyd (UNLV) - The wide receiver played for the Frankfurt Galaxy of NFLE and was on the preseason rosters of the Jacksonville Jaguars and Buffalo Bills.
- 22 Chrys Chukwuma(Arkansas) -The running back was briefly on the Dallas Cowboys' roster.
- 30 Rod Smart (Western Kentucky) - "He Hate Me" would go on to become the first former XFL player to appear in a Super Bowl: Super Bowl XXXVIII for the Panthers.
- 82 Mike Furrey (Ohio State/Northern Iowa) - Like Smart, the receiver has enjoyed a long NFL career.
- 17 Paul McCallum - Kicker who played for NFLE's Scottish Claymores. Most recently played in 2016 as a member of the BC Lions franchise, in the Canadian Football League; McCallum was the last active former XFL player in any professional league.
- 92 Kelvin T.G. Kinney (Virginia State) - The defensive end has spent time with the Detroit Lions and Washington Redskins.
- 31 Kelly Herndon (Toledo) - The cornerback later landed with the Seattle Seahawks. In Super Bowl XL, he returned an interception for a then record of 76 yards. Since then it has been broken by Pittsburgh Steelers linebacker James Harrison.
- 16 Mark Grieb - The quarterback would go on to win two ArenaBowls with the San Jose SaberCats. In the XFL, Grieb only got his chance when the starting quarterback Ryan Clement was injured.

== Season-by-season ==
Season records
Season	W	L	T	Finish	Playoff results
2001	4	6	0	4th Western	Out of playoffs

=== Schedule ===
==== Regular season ====
Week	Date	Opponent	Result	Record	Venue	Attendance
1	February 3	New York/New Jersey Hitmen	W 19–0	1–0	Sam Boyd Stadium	30,389
2	February 11	at Memphis Maniax	W 25–3	2–0	Liberty Bowl Memorial Stadium	30,117
3	February 17	Los Angeles Xtreme	L 9–12	2–1	Sam Boyd Stadium	26,135
4	February 25	at San Francisco Demons	W 16–9	3–1	Pacific Bell Park	34,737
5	March 4	at Chicago Enforcers	L 13–15	3–2	Soldier Field	15,281
6	March 10	at Orlando Rage	L 15–27	3–3	Florida Citrus Bowl	24,677
7	March 17	Birmingham Thunderbolts	W 34–12	4–3	Sam Boyd Stadium	23,538
8	March 24	at Los Angeles Xtreme	L 26–35	4–4	Los Angeles Memorial Coliseum	20,738
9	April 1	San Francisco Demons	L 9–14	4–5	Sam Boyd Stadium	17,656
10	April 7	Memphis Maniax	L 3–16	4–6	Sam Boyd Stadium	15,378

== Personnel ==
=== Staff ===
2001 Las Vegas Outlaws staff
Front office: Vice president/general manager – Bob Ackles; Director of player personnel – Don Gregory; Head coaches: Head coach – Jim Criner; Offensive coaches: Offensive coordinator/quarterbacks – Vince Alcalde; Running backs – Ron Dickerson, Jr.; Receivers – Scott Criner; Tight ends/offensive line – Mike Rockwood	Defensive coaches: Defensive coordinator – Mark Criner; Defensive line – Kevin Peoples; Linebackers – Tom Mason; Secondary – Rashid Gayle

== Roster ==
2001 Las Vegas Outlaws roster
Quarterbacks (QB): 16 Ryan Clement; 14 Mark Grieb; Running backs (RB): 22 Chrys Chukwuma; 30 Rod Smart; 33 Ben Snell; Wide receivers (WR): 82 Mike Furrey; 80 Eric Guliford; 2 Nakia Jenkins; 88 Yo Murphy; Tight ends (TE): 86 Rickey Brady; 85 Keith Jennings	Offensive linemen (OL): 73 Tony Berti; 74 Jon Blackman; 63 Lamont Burns G; -- Aaron Graham C/G; 79 Patrick Kesi; 71 Mark Nori G; 66 Lonnie Palelei G; Defensive linemen (DL): 95 Antonio Edwards DE; 92 Kelvin Kinney DE; 90 Michael Mason DE; 72 Carl Simpson DE; 97 Ty Perton DT; 68 Angel Rubio DT; 99 Jermaine Smith DT	Linebackers (LB): 44 Mike Crawford; 54 Kurt Gouveia; 39 Jonathan Jackson; 50 Toran James; 48 Joe Tuipala; Defensive backs (DB): 20 Chris Bayne CB; 24 Kory Blackwell CB; 31 Kelly Herndon; 35 Jason Kaiser CB; 27 Brandon Sanders; 3 Kevin Scott; 29 Hurley Tarver; 28 Jamel Williams CB; Special teams (ST): 17 Paul McCallum K/P	Practice squad: 13 Jim Ballard QB; 84 Brett Bech WR; 78 Adriano Belli DT; 62 David Diaz-Infante G; 87 Werner Hippler TE; 7 Corey Nelson WR; 68 Angel Rubio G; Reserve: 12 Chuck Clements QB (IR); Rookies in italics, 7 practice squad

== Standings ==
Western Division
Team	W	L	T	PCT	PF	PA	STK
Los Angeles Xtreme	7	3	0	.700	235	166	W1
San Francisco Demons	5	5	0	.500	156	161	L1
Memphis Maniax	5	5	0	.500	167	166	W2
Las Vegas Outlaws	4	6	0	.400	169	143	L3

== Team leaders ==
Legend
Led the league

=== Passing ===
Passing statistics (Note: Guliford threw one incompletion)
NAME	GP	GS	Record	Cmp	Att	Pct	Yds	TD	Int	Rtg
Ryan Clement	7	6	3–3	78	138	56.5	805	9	4	83.2
Mark Grieb	4	3	1–2	37	78	47.4	408	3	4	54.9
Mike Cawley	2	1	0–1	17	38	44.7	180	1	2	45.9
Totals	10	10	4–6	132	255	51.8	1,393	13	10	68.6

=== Rushing ===
Rushing statistics
NAME	Att	Yds	Avg	Lng	TD
Rod "He Hate Me" Smart	146	555	3.8	31	3
Ben Snell	31	123	4.0	24	0
Chrys Chukwuma	20	104	5.2	34	1
Ryan Clement	10	19	1.9	20	0
Mike Cawley	8	41	5.1	15	0
Mark Grieb	2	-2	-1.0	-1	0
Yo Murphy	1	0	0.0	0	0
Jim Ballard	1	-1	-1.0	-1	0
Mike Furrey	1	-3	-3.0	-3	0
Totals	220	836	3.8	34	4

=== Receiving ===
Receiving statistics
NAME	Rec	Yds	Avg	Lng	TD
Yo Murphy	27	273	10.1	35	3
Rod "He Hate Me" Smart	27	245	9.1	46	0
Mike Furrey	18	242	13.4	41t	1
Rickey Brady	15	158	10.5	25	5
Eric Guliford	9	100	11.1	23	0
Corey Nelson	9	80	8.9	18t	1
Brett Bech	7	95	13.6	20	0
Nakia Jenkins	7	74	10.6	27t	1
Ben Snell	6	37	6.2	15	1
Todd Floyd	3	71	23.7	37	1
Chrys Chukwuma	3	12	4.0	8	0
Werner Hippler	1	6	6.0	6	0
Totals	132	1,393	10.6	46	13

=== Scoring ===
7-21 (33.3)% on extra point conversion attempts

Total Scoring
NAME	Rush	Rec	Return	XPM	FGM	PTS
Paul McCallum	0	0	0	0	12	36
Rickey Brady	0	5	0	2	0	32
Rod "He Hate Me" Smart	3	0	0	2	0	20
Yo Murphy	0	3	0	1	0	19
Chris Bayne	0	0	1	0	0	6
Chrys Chukwuma	1	0	0	0	0	6
Todd Floyd	0	1	0	0	0	6
Mike Furrey	0	1	0	0	0	6
Kurt Gouveia	0	0	1	0	0	6
Nakia Jenkins	0	1	0	0	0	6
Jason Kaiser	0	0	1	0	0	6
Corey Nelson	0	1	0	0	0	6
Ben Snell	0	1	0	0	0	6
Jamel Williams	0	0	1	0	0	6
Mike Cawley	0	0	0	1	0	1
Lonnie Palelei	0	0	0	1	0	1
Totals	4	13	4	7	12	169
