= Rod Smart =

American football player (born 1977)

No. 30, 24, 32, 39
- Position: Running back / Kick returner

Personal information
- Born: January 9, 1977 (age 49); Lakeland, Florida, U.S.
- Listed height: 5 ft 11 in (1.80 m)
- Listed weight: 201 lb (91 kg)

Career information
- High school: Lakeland
- College: Western Kentucky
- NFL draft: 2000: undrafted

Career history
- San Diego Chargers (2000)*; Las Vegas Outlaws (2001); Edmonton Eskimos (2001); Philadelphia Eagles (2001); Carolina Panthers (2002–2005); Oakland Raiders (2006)*
- * Offseason or practice squad member only

Career NFL statistics
- Rushing yards: 67
- Return yards: 1,731
- Return touchdowns: 1
- Stats at Pro Football Reference

Torrold DeShaun "Rod" Smart (born January 9, 1977) is an American former professional football player who was a running back in the National Football League (NFL). He played college football for Western Kentucky. He was signed by the San Diego Chargers as an undrafted free agent after the 2000 NFL draft.

Smart first played a professional football season with the Las Vegas Outlaws of the original XFL, where he was known by the nickname "He Hate Me". He then joined the Edmonton Eskimos of the Canadian Football League (CFL) before signing with the Philadelphia Eagles, all within the same year (2001). He then spent four seasons (2002–2005) with the Carolina Panthers, including winning the NFC Championship in 2003. He also spent time with the Oakland Raiders in 2006, as well as Team Tennessee of the never-launched All American Football League.

== College career ==
Smart was born in Lakeland, Florida, one of several children. His parents were known to give Rod and his siblings unusual nicknames, including "Bone Bone" and "Fat Girl." He attended Lakeland High School, where he played both running back and cornerback for the football team, and also ran for the track team.

Smart attended Western Kentucky University, where he played for the Hilltoppers football team. He ended his career at Western Kentucky ranked tenth all-time in school history with 2,305 rushing yards on 356 carries with 21 touchdowns. He also recorded 115 receiving yards, 279 kickoff return yards, and 14 yards on punt returns. He started all 11 games as a senior in 1999 and was a first-team All-Gateway Conference selection. In his senior season, he led the team with 1,249 yards rushing and 10 touchdowns on 188 carries, for a 6.4 yard average, while his all purpose yards and rushing yards ranked fifth and sixth respectively in school history for a single season. He graduated with a degree in kinesiology.

=== Track and field ===
Smart was also a member of the track team at Western Kentucky, where he specialized in the 60 meters and 100 meters.

==== Personal bests ====
Event	Time (seconds)	Venue	Date
55 meters	6.36	Jonesboro, Arkansas	February 27, 2000
60 meters	6.86	Indianapolis, Indiana	February 7, 1999
100 meters	10.56	Knoxville, Tennessee	May 14, 2000

== Professional career ==
=== San Diego Chargers ===
Smart signed with the San Diego Chargers as an undrafted rookie free agent in 2000. He finished training camp with the team, but was released by the Chargers prior to the start of the 2000 NFL season.

=== Las Vegas Outlaws ===
In 2001, Smart joined the Las Vegas Outlaws of the XFL and adopted the nickname of "He Hate Me" which he wore on the back of his uniform. He finished the season ranked second in the league in rushing with 555 yards. He also finished third in average rushing yards (3.8 yards per carry), and scored three touchdowns over the course of the one and only XFL season. He led the Outlaws in rushing, and was second on the team in receiving with 27 catches for 245 yards.

Of the over 300 players to don an XFL uniform during its lone 2001 season, league executives noted that while most saw the league solely as a way to further their own careers in hopes of returning to the NFL, Smart fully embraced the league's approach to football and sports entertainment. In the documentary This Was the XFL, Smart stated that had the league survived for a second season, he was certain to have returned and had no intention of trying out for an NFL or CFL position before the XFL collapsed.

==== "He Hate Me" ====
"He Hate Me" is the phrase Smart chose to place on the back of his Las Vegas Outlaws football jersey. Though most sports organizations allow only a surname or first initial and surname to be placed on the back of a jersey, XFL rules permitted players' jerseys to be stitched with whatever words they wanted. The Outlaws happened to be playing in the league's first nationally televised game (the one that would, ultimately, be the most widely watched game, as the league's viewership plummeted after that point), and the league's choice of camera angles more akin to video games meant that Smart's jersey was prominently featured on the telecasts. The jersey was the XFL's best seller.

Smart explained the origin of the grammatically non-standard phrase in a January 30, 2004 article with the Milwaukee Journal Sentinel as, "Basically, my opponent is going to hate me. After I win, he's gonna hate me. It is what it is. It's a saying I was saying when I'd feel something wasn't going my way. For example, (when) I was on the squad in Vegas and coach was putting other guys in, (if) I felt I'm better than them, you know, hey, 'he hate me.' See what I'm saying? Give me a chance. That's all I ask. It came from the heart. Within. The way I felt. I feel as if everyone hates me, from my mom to my dad and even my brothers and sisters everyone "Hates Me". My buddy Greg Kates always used to use it, so I took it from him."

Smart stated that he originally planned to use a different nickname on the back of his jersey every week of the season but abandoned that plan when "He Hate Me" became a national sensation. He and his agent also credit the nickname with getting NFL scouts to notice him after the XFL collapsed.

When Smart and the Outlaws played divisional rival the Los Angeles Xtreme, Xtreme players Juan Long and Shawn Stuckey respectively put "I Hate He" and "I Hate He Too" on the back of their jerseys to express their disdain for Smart. In a later game between those two teams, those two players changed their nicknames to "Still Hate He" and "Still Hate He Too". The curious maxim also caught the eye of American audiences (as well as Smart's future Carolina Panthers teammate Jake Delhomme, who named one of his thoroughbreds, "She Hate Me"). The title of Spike Lee's 2004 film She Hate Me was also inspired by Smart's nickname.

=== Edmonton Eskimos ===
After the end of the XFL season Smart signed with the Edmonton Eskimos of the Canadian Football League (CFL). He played one regular season game for Edmonton before being released in August 2001.

=== Philadelphia Eagles ===
The Philadelphia Eagles of the NFL signed Smart to their practice roster on October 2, 2001. He was promoted to the active roster on November 19, 2001, appeared in six regular season games, mainly on special teams, and rushed for six yards on two carries. The Eagles waived Smart at the end of their 2002 training camp.

=== Carolina Panthers ===
In September, 2002, Smart was claimed off waivers by the Carolina Panthers. He played in all 16 regular season games, and led the Panthers with 24 special teams tackles. He produced at least one special teams tackle in 14 games en route to recording the second-highest number of special team tackles in a season in team history.

In 2003, Smart played in all 16 Panthers' games for the second consecutive season. For the first time in a Panthers' uniform, he was utilized as a kick returner, in addition to his special teams coverage duties. He averaged 23.1 yards on 41 kickoff returns for 947 yards, including a 100-yard touchdown against the New Orleans Saints on October 5, 2003. He finished the Panthers' 2003 season ranked second with 14 special teams tackles and recorded his first career blocked punt. He also rushed for 49 yards on 20 carries and caught three passes for 11 yards on offense. He contributed to a Panthers' special teams coverage unit that ranked fifth in the NFL in opponents' kickoff return average. In Super Bowl XXXVIII, Smart returned four punts for 74 yards.

Smart's 2004 season was cut short due to injuries. He played in the first three games of the season for the Panthers, but was inactive for the next four before being placed on injured reserve with an injured left knee on November 3, 2004. Despite his limited action in 2004, he averaged 21.1 yards on eight kickoff returns for 169 yards, with the longest return being 33 yards. He also rushed four yards on three carries, and caught one pass for five yards, on offense.

In 2005, Smart returned to the Panthers healthy, played in 12 games, and led the Panthers with 29 kickoff returns for 615 yards (for a 21.2 yard average). He also recorded nine tackles and one fumble recovery for the Panthers' kick coverage unit. After four seasons, Smart was released by the Panthers on March 1, 2006.

=== Oakland Raiders ===
On May 4, 2006, Smart signed with the Oakland Raiders as a free agent. Being injured for part of the 2006 pre-season, he failed to make the final, 53-man Raiders roster on September 2, 2006.

=== All American Football League ===
Smart was selected by Team Tennessee during the inaugural draft of the All American Football League on January 26, 2008. However, when the league was postponed for its inaugural season, all players were released from their contracts, leaving him a free agent.

== Post-football ==
After being released by the Oakland Raiders, Smart became a personal trainer, before appearing in Don’t Blame The Lettuce. In 2015, Yahoo Sports reported he was living in Charlotte, North Carolina and that he "purportedly" worked as a high school guidance counselor.

== Personal life ==
Smart is a fan of 1970s funk and soul music bands such as Earth, Wind and Fire, Heatwave, and Parliament. He was the "class clown" but managed to keep his grades well above average with all A's and some B's at Lakeland Senior High School. His nickname growing up and in high school was "The Rocket" after Raghib Ismail of Notre Dame, because of his speed, running a 4.25 second 40-yard dash. Smart's younger brother is Chris Rainey, former Lakeland High School standout running back and former National Football League player. Smart's first cousin is former Philadelphia Eagles receiver Freddie Mitchell.

On June 18, 2019, Lancaster County, South Carolina, sheriff's deputies declared Smart "missing and endangered" after his family reported that his whereabouts had been unknown since June 12. He was reported by the sheriff's office as having been found safe later the same day he was reported missing.
