= Kory Blackwell =

American football player (born 1972)

No. 26
- Position: Defensive back

Personal information
- Born: August 3, 1972 (age 54); New York, New York, U.S.
- Listed height: 5 ft 11 in (1.80 m)
- Listed weight: 185 lb (84 kg)

Career information
- High school: Aldai E. Stevenson (New York)
- College: UMass
- NFL draft: 1997: undrafted
- Expansion draft: 1999: 1st round, 20th overall pick

Career history
- New York Giants (1997}; Scottish Claymores (1998); New York Giants (1998); Cleveland Browns (1999)*; San Francisco 49ers (1999)*; Scottish Claymores (2000); Oakland Raiders (2000)*; Las Vegas Outlaws (2001); Amsterdam Admirals (2001); Jacksonville Jaguars (2001)*; Amsterdam Admirals (2002); New York Dragons (2003)
- * Offseason or practice squad member only

Awards and highlights
- All-A-10 (1997)

Career NFL statistics
- Games played: 5
- Stats at Pro Football Reference

Career AFL statistics
- Games played: 6
- Tackles: 29
- Stats at ArenaFan.com

Kory L. Blackwell (born August 3, 1972) is an American former professional football player who was a cornerback in the National Football League (NFL) for the New York Giants and the Cleveland Browns. He played college football for the UMass Minutemen.

== College career ==
Blackwell attended Nassau Community College for two years and was named a Junior College All-American before signing a letter of intent to play for UMass. While at the University of Massachusetts Amherst, he was an All-Atlantic 10 Conference selection. Even though he only played with the Minutemen for two seasons Blackwell finished his collegiate career ranked sixth on the schools all-time pass defended list.

== Professional career ==
=== New York Giants ===
Blackwell was signed by the New York Giants in 1997 shortly after his college career as an undrafted free agent. He was invited to training camp and spent most of the season on the team's practice squad. In 1998 Blackwell appeared in five games for the Giants mainly on special teams recording three special teams tackles. In the offseason he was allocated to the Giants NFL Europe team the Scottish Claymores and played in 10 games with the Claymores where he notched 27 tackles, 12 pass defences, eight special teams tackles and three interceptions including one returned for touchdown.

=== Cleveland Browns ===
Following the season Blackwell was picked by the Cleveland Browns in the expansion draft. He spent the season with the Browns appearing primarily on special teams and as a backup cornerback and did not record a tackle.

=== Oakland Raiders ===
In 2000 Blackwell signed on with the Oakland Raiders but was cut during training camp. He again played with the Scottish Claymores in NFL Europe and recorded 29 tackles and 7 interception.

=== Las Vegas Outlaws ===
For the 2001 season Blackwell was selected in the newly formed XFL by the Las Vegas Outlaws with the 21st overall pick in the draft. He started at cornerback with the Outlaws and recorded 22 tackles and 3 interception on the season. Blackwell appeared in NFL Europe once more this time with the Amsterdam Admirals recording 31 tackles and 2 interception; one returned for a 95-yard touchdown team record.

=== Jacksonville Jaguars ===
After the XFL season, Blackwell signed with the Jacksonville Jaguars prior to training camp but was cut in the preseason.

=== New York Dragons ===
In 2003, Blackwell was a member of the New York Dragons of the Arena Football League.

== Personal life ==
Kory is married to Sonja Blackwell and has three sons; Karon, Rhyjon and Chey Blackwell. Kory was a juvenile counselor with the New York City Administration for Children's Services, working at Crossroads Juvenile Center and is currently a probation officer with the New York City Department Of Probation. At the age of 9, Kory was in a TV commercial with Dallas Cowboys' Herschel Walker.
