= Chrys Chukwuma =

American gridiron football player (born 1978)

Profile
- Position: Running back

Personal information
- Born: May 12, 1978 (age 48); Montgomery, Alabama, U.S.
- Listed height: 6 ft 1 in (1.85 m)
- Listed weight: 240 lb (109 kg)

Career information
- High school: Lanier High School
- College: Arkansas
- NFL draft: 2000: undrafted

Career history
- Dallas Cowboys (2000)*; Las Vegas Outlaws (2001); Tennessee Titans (2001)*; Edmonton Eskimos (2002)*; Montgomery Maulers (2005); Arkansas Stars (2006)
- * Offseason or practice squad member only

Chrys Chukwuma (born May 12, 1978) is an American former professional football running back who was signed as an undrafted free agent by the Dallas Cowboys and played for the Las Vegas Outlaws of the defunct XFL, Tennessee Titans, Edmonton Eskimos, Montgomery Maulers and the Arkansas Stars of the National Indoor Football League. He was drafted in the 16th round of the All American Football League by Team Arkansas.

== Early life ==
Chrys attended Sidney Lanier High School located in Montgomery, Alabama. He was named all-state and all-metro honors due to his senior career that totaled 1,200 rushing yards and 16 touchdowns. He was also a member of the track and baseball teams.

== College career ==
Chukwuma attended Arkansas. In his freshman year, he went into the record book for most rushing yards in school history for a freshman with 590 yards. In his sophomore year, he gained 186 yards for 3 touchdowns. He was later sidelined due to a back injury that put him out the rest of the season. As a junior, he led Arkansas with 870 yards and 8 touchdowns on 149 carries, and helped the Razorbacks win a share of the 1998 SEC Western Division championship. In his senior year he was the second leading rusher with 552 yards and 8 touchdowns on 172 carries, while helping Arkansas win the 2000 Cotton Bowl Classic over former Southwest Conference arch-rival Texas.

== Professional career ==
Chukwuma went undrafted in the 2000 NFL draft and was signed as an undrafted rookie free agent by the Dallas Cowboys in 2000. He was drafted in the XFL draft by the Las Vegas Outlaws. During his tenure in the XFL his nickname was Chuckwagon. on May 8, 2001, he was signed by the Tennessee Titans. He was injured before the season. On April 23, 2002, Chrys was signed by the Edmonton Eskimos of the CFL. He was released on June 6. Chrys did not play on a professional team until 2005 when he was signed by the Montgomery Maulers. He rushed for 535 yards, 25 touchdowns and 7 catches for 1 touchdown. On December 15 he was signed by the Arkansas Stars. In the 2006 season for the Stars he rushed for 324 yards and 10 touchdowns. In 2008, he was drafted by Team Arkansas of the All American Football League. The league never played a game.
