= Jason Kaiser =

American football player (born 1973)

No. 6, 24, 35, 26, 20
- Position: Safety

Personal information
- Born: November 9, 1973 (age 52); Denver, Colorado, U.S.
- Listed height: 6 ft 0 in (1.83 m)
- Listed weight: 190 lb (86 kg)

Career information
- High school: Highlands Ranch (CO)
- College: Culver-Stockton
- NFL draft: 1996: undrafted

Career history
- Hamilton Tiger-Cats (1996–1997); Denver Broncos (1998)*; Kansas City Chiefs (1998–1999); Dallas Cowboys (1999); Las Vegas Outlaws (2001); Washington Redskins (2001)*; Tampa Bay Storm (2002); Dallas Desperados (2002); Detroit Fury (2003); Columbus Destroyers (2005)*
- * Offseason or practice squad member only

Career NFL statistics
- Games played: 1
- Stats at Pro Football Reference

Career AFL statistics
- Receptions: 73
- Receiving yards: 623
- Receiving touchdowns: 17
- Interceptions: 2
- Stats at ArenaFan.com

Jason A. Kaiser (born November 9, 1973) is an American former professional football player who was a safety in the National Football League (NFL) for the Kansas City Chiefs and Dallas Cowboys. He also was a member of the Hamilton Tiger-Cats, Las Vegas Outlaws, Tampa Bay Storm, Dallas Desperados and Detroit Fury. He played college football for the Culver–Stockton Wildcats.

== Early life ==
Kaiser attended Highlands Ranch High School in Highlands Ranch, Colorado, where he practiced football and baseball. As a senior, he received All-conference honors in football at quarterback, while making All-State and All-Conference in baseball at center field.

He wasn't highly recruited as a quarterback in football because of his size (5-foot-10, 155-pounds).

== College career ==
Kaiser accepted a football scholarship from NAIA Culver-Stockton College, because the school allowed him to participate in both football and baseball.

He played his first three seasons at quarterback, posting 2,537 passing yards, 14 passing touchdowns, 30 interceptions, 359 carries for 942 yards and 11 rushing touchdowns.

As a senior, he was converted into a safety, recording 58 tackles, 5 interceptions (led the team and conference), 16 passes defensed, 3 forced fumbles, 17 kickoff returns for 384 yards and 16 punt returns for 179 yards. Kaiser was an Honorable Mention NAIA All-American in football in 1995.

He played 4 years on the school's baseball team, receiving Honorable Mention NAIA All-American accolades at center field as a senior in 1996. He also earned GTE Academic All-American honors.

In 2006, he was inducted into the Culver-Stockton College Athletic Hall of Fame.

== Professional career ==
=== Hamilton Tiger-Cats ===
On May 31, 1996, he signed as a free agent with the Hamilton Tiger-Cats of the Canadian Football League. He appeared in 8 games, registering 13 tackles, 2 interceptions, 10 punt returns for 81 yards and 3 kickoff returns for 43 yards.

In 1997, he appeared in 3 games and had 3 tackles before being released.

=== Denver Broncos ===
On April 23, 1998, he was signed as an undrafted free agent by the Denver Broncos. He was released on August 25.

=== Kansas City Chiefs ===
On November 3, 1998, he was signed to the Kansas City Chiefs' practice squad. On December 17, he was promoted to the active roster to make his NFL debut in the fifteenth game against the New York Giants on December 20.

On September 5, 1999, he was released and later signed to the practice squad.

=== Dallas Cowboys ===
On December 22, 1999, he was signed by the Dallas Cowboys from the Chiefs' practice squad. He was declared inactive in 2 games, before seeing his first action in the NFC Wild Card Playoff game against the Minnesota Vikings, playing in the nickel defense, while tallying one defensive tackle and one special teams tackle. He was released on August 21, 2000.

=== Las Vegas Outlaws ===
Kaiser was selected by the Las Vegas Outlaws with the 364th overall pick in the XFL draft. In 2001, he registered 28 tackles, one fumble recovery for a touchdown, 7 kickoff returns for 101 yards and 9 punt returns for 28 yards.

=== Washington Redskins ===
On July 10, 2001, he was signed as a free agent by the Washington Redskins. He was released on August 28.

=== Arena Football League ===
On December 21, 2001, he signed with the Tampa Bay Storm of the Arena Football League to be a defensive specialist. On June 20, 2002, he was signed by the Dallas Desperados to play as a wide receiver / defensive back. He was traded to the Detroit Fury in October.

On November 8, 2002, he was signed by the Detroit Fury to play as a wide receiver / linebacker. He was released on October 9, 2003. On October 11, 2004, he was signed by the Columbus Destroyers to play as a wide receiver / defensive back. He was released on January 19, 2005.

== Personal life ==
After his pro career, Kaiser attended Parker College of Chiropractic in Dallas, Texas and graduated magna cum laude. Kaiser holds postgraduate certifications in Clinical Neurology, Acupuncture, Strength and Conditioning, and High School Sport Physicals.

Kaiser owns and operates Fusion Sport Rehab in Littleton, Colorado. He is married to his high school sweetheart, Sheri Bruscino.
