= Walter Fondren =

American football player and conservation activist (1936–2010)

No. 24
- Positions: QB, HB, P, DB, K, PR, KR

Personal information
- Born: April 29, 1936; Houston, Texas, U.S.
- Died: January 28, 2010 (aged 73); Houston, Texas, U.S.
- Listed height: 5 ft 11 in (1.80 m)
- Listed weight: 170 lb (77 kg)

Career information
- High school: Houston (Lamar)
- College: Texas

Awards and highlights
- Texas Sportswriter's Outstanding High School Football Player of the Year (1953); Texas Longhorn Football MVP (1956); First-team All-SWC (1955); Second-team All-SWC (1956); Texas High School Football Hall of Fame (1984); Most Minutes Played in a Season by a Longhorn; Highest Completion Percentage by a Longhorn in a game with min. 10 attempts; SWC freshman javelin

Walter William Fondren III (April 29, 1936 – January 28, 2010) was an all-conference football player and conservation activist. He played halfback, quarterback and punter for the Texas Longhorns from 1955 to 1957 and was the first starting quarterback for Darrell Royal. He was later a founding member of the Coastal Conservation Association.

== Early life ==
Fondren was the son of Doris Ledwidge and Walter William Fondren, Jr. and grandson of Humble Oil co-founder Walter William Fondren, Sr. He grew up with his three sisters in Houston, Texas and became a star athlete in high school. Playing tailback, he led Lamar High School to the 1953 High School State Championship, the first undisputed football championship for a Houston school in 33 years. He won the Texas Sportswriter's "Outstanding High School Football Player of the Year" Award, and received all-State, all-Southern and All-American high school honors, becoming one of the state's top high school recruits. He also ran track and played basketball and baseball.

Fondren was also an excellent golfer like his father, who played varsity golf at the University of Oklahoma.

== College football ==
Despite family ties to Rice and SMU, Fondren surprised many by choosing to attend Texas, in part due to what he viewed as a superior geology program. He started as a quarterback, but spent two years playing halfback before getting the chance to do so again. He was also the starting punter, played defensive back and returned kickoffs and punts. He played so much that he still holds the school record for minutes played in a season.

He played quarterback on the freshman team and started his sophomore season in 1955 playing that position as well. In fact he earned his first start at quarterback in the first game of the 1955 season, but by the second game that year he was moved to tailback to make room for Joe Clements after he threw for over 200 yards against Tulane. Despite the late change, he led the team in rushing, all-purpose yards, and scoring and was named "First Team All Southwest Conference" as a halfback. His success that year led to comparisons to SMU's Doak Walker because of his ability to run, pass and punt the football; and because his sophomore statistics exceeded Walker's. He was named a candidate for All-American during that year, but was not named one at the end. Despite Fondren's success, the team struggled to a 5-5 record, losing to #3 Oklahoma and #7 TCU before upsetting #8 Texas A&M to finish the season.

Prior to his junior year, he suffered a shoulder injury during spring practice that kept him from running track that year. Nonetheless, in the following football season Fondren again led the team in rushing, all-purpose yards, and scoring and won the first "George `Hook' McCullough Football Outstanding Player Award" given annually to the team's MVP. Despite his play, the team posted its worst record since 1938, going 1-9 on the season. As of 2014, Texas has never failed to win at least 4 games in a season since then. As a result of the poor showing, coach Ed Price was fired and Darrell Royal was hired to replace him.

When Royal arrived in 1957, he moved Fondren back to quarterback for his senior year and named him a co-captain. As a quarterback, he could throw the running pass in the split-T option and created a second running threat in the backfield. Despite a knee injury during spring practice, he played both offense and defense racking up so much playing time that he still holds the record for most minutes played in a season. He led the team in passing yards and, again, in total offense. Against Baylor he went 10 for 11 passing and set the school record for highest pass completion percentage in a game (minimum of 10 passes). With Fondren at quarterback, the Longhorns were vastly improved over the 1956 squad, going 6-4-1 and beating three ranked teams - #13 Rice, #17 TCU and #4 Texas A&M, They lost to #1 Oklahoma and finished the season ranked #11 and 2nd in the Southwest Conference. They were invited to play in the 1958 Sugar Bowl, where they lost to #7 Mississippi.

He finished his career at 7-5-1 as a starting quarterback.

Fondren was drafted in the 30th and final round, 354th overall, of the 1958 NFL draft by the Los Angeles Rams, but turned down a professional football career, as he was already a millionaire-to-be. Much was made of his wealth during his time in college, but mostly Fondren tried to downplay it, though Fondren did own and fly a private plane. Darrell Royal actually asked the NCAA if he was allowed to ride in it.

He was also on the University of Texas track team and won the Southwest Conference freshman championship in the javelin in 1955 and also made the all-intramural basketball team.

=== Records ===
- UT - Most Yards Receiving by a Running Back, Season (318), surpassed by Eric Metcalf in 1986
- UT - Most Punt Returns, Game (7), surpassed by Nathan Vasher in 2001
- UT - Most Punt Return Yards, Game (110), surpassed by Johnnie Johnson in 1977
- UT - Most Kickoff Returns, Season (17), broke his own record from prior year, surpassed by Kevin Nelson in 1986
- UT - Most Kickoff Returns, Career (43), surpassed by Mike Adams in 1996
- UT - Most Kickoff Return Yards, Career (783), surpassed by Raymond Clayborn in 1976
- UT - Highest Average Gain Per Kickoff Return, game (33.3) (min. 3), surpassed by Quan Cosby in 2008
- UT - Most Returns, Career (66), surpassed by Clayborn in 1976
- UT - Most Return Yards, Season (495), surpassed by Johnson in 1977
- UT - Most Return Yards, Career (1037), surpassed by Johnson in 1977
- UT - Most Minutes Played, Season
- UT - Highest Completion Percentage, game (90.9) (min. 10 attempts)
- UT - Most Punts, Career (125), surpassed by Russell Erxleben in 1977
- UT - Highest Average Yards per Punt, Season (40.9), surpassed by Jack Collins in 1959
- UT - Highest Average of Extra Points Made, Career (0.806), surpassed by Tony Crosby in 1963

Bold is still active

== Conservation ==
Fondren, a lifelong sportsman, became active in the conservation movement. In 1977, he became the founding chairman of the Gulf Coast Conservation Association (GCCA), now the Coastal Conservation Association (CCA). He was the first recipient of the CCA's Lifetime Achievement Award in 1997 and became the chairman emeritus in 2009.

He served on the Gulf of Mexico Fishery Management Council as a member from 1982 through 1992; was Council Chairman from 1989 to 1990; and also served on the Billfish Advisory Committee since 1994. He received the Harvey Weil Sportsman/Conservationist Award in 2000 and the prestigious Charles H. Lyles Award in 2001 from the Gulf States Marine Fisheries Commission in recognition of a lifetime of exceptional contributions on behalf of marine resources. He was inducted into the International Game Fish Association Hall of Fame in 2004 and served as a trustee for many years. In 2005, he was named one of the 50 legends of fishing by Field & Stream magazine.

== Later life ==
Fondren graduated from The University of Texas with a Bachelor of Science in Geology and went into the oil business. He was an early Whataburger franchisee who owned stores in Texas, New Mexico and Arizona before selling the business in the 1970s.

He became a successful amateur golfer, who won several tournaments. He played in the 1966 British Amateur Open where he lost to William C. Campbell in the third round.

He was inducted into The University of Texas Hall of Honor, in 1983, and the Texas High School Sports Hall of Fame in 1984.
