= Braniff Bonaventure =

American football player (born 1973)

Profile
- Position: Quarterback

Personal information
- Born: April 21, 1973 (age 53)
- Listed height: 6 ft 2 in (1.88 m)
- Listed weight: 190 lb (86 kg)

Career information
- High school: Dr. Phillips (Orlando, Florida)
- College: Furman (1993–1996)

Career history
- Florida Bobcats (1999); Orlando Predators (2001)

Career AFL statistics
- Comp. / Att.: 41 / 84
- Passing yards: 448
- TD–INT: 7–3
- Passer rating: 70.93
- Stats at ArenaFan.com

Braniff Bonaventure (born April 21, 1973) is an American former professional football quarterback who played two seasons in the Arena Football League (AFL) with the Florida Bobcats and Orlando Predators. He played college football at Furman University.

== Early life and college ==
Braniff Bonaventure was born on April 21, 1973. He attended Dr. Phillips High School in Orlando, Florida and was a three-year starter at quarterback.

He was a four-year letterman for the Furman Paladins of Furman University 1993 to 1996. He graduated in 1997.

== Professional career ==
After his college career, Bonaventure had a short stint as the third-string quarterback for the Montreal Alouettes of the Canadian Football League.

Bonaventure played in 13 games for the Florida Bobcats of the Arena Football League (AFL) in 1999 as the backup to Fred McNair, completing 32 of 64 passes (50.0%) for 345 yards, six touchdowns, and one interception.

On March 21, 2000, he was traded to the Orlando Predators for Mike Cawley. Bonaventure was the third-string quarterback for the Predators during the 2000 season. He appeared in one game that year but did not record any statistics. He re-signed with the team on March 21, 2001. He opened the 2001 preseason as the team's starting quarterback but ended up only playing in two games during the 2001 regular season, recording nine completions on 20 passing attempts (45.0%) for 103 yards, one touchdown, and two interceptions. He was waived by the Predators on April 25, 2001.

== Coaching career ==
Bonaventure has spent time as a high school football coach in Georgia after his playing career, including stints as an assistant coach at Chamblee High School, Dunwoody High School, and Cambridge High School.
