= Chris Bayne =

American football player (born 1975)

No. 20, 47, 46, 28
- Position: Safety

Personal information
- Born: March 22, 1975 (age 51); Riverside, California, U.S.
- Listed height: 6 ft 1 in (1.85 m)
- Listed weight: 205 lb (93 kg)

Career information
- High school: North (Riverside)
- College: Fresno State
- NFL draft: 1997: 7th round, 222nd overall pick

Career history
- Atlanta Falcons (1997–1998); Scottish Claymores (2000); Miami Dolphins (2000)*; Las Vegas Outlaws (2001); Hamilton Tiger-Cats (2003)
- * Offseason or practice squad member only

Career NFL statistics
- Tackles: 3
- Stats at Pro Football Reference

Christopher Oliver Bayne (born March 22, 1975) is an American former professional football player who was a defensive back in the National Football League (NFL). He played college football for the Fresno State Bulldogs.

== Early life ==
Bayne was born and raised in Riverside, California, where he attended North High School, playing outside linebacker and running back. Besides football, Bayne was also a member of the track team, performing in the 100 meters and long jump. During his senior year, Bayne was recruited by Arizona, Utah, Nevada, and Pittsburgh.

== College career ==
After high school, Bayne attended San Bernardino Valley Junior College. He played safety and recorded seven interceptions in his two-year career. Bayne later attended Fresno State, where he majored in Biology. He was moved to outside linebacker his senior year. That same year he recorded 77 tackles and 3 sacks.

== NFL ==
Bayne was selected in the seventh round (pick #222) of the 1997 NFL draft by the Atlanta Falcons. During the 1997 preseason, Bayne recorded 10 tackles and 1 interception. Due to this performance, he made the 53-man roster. Bayne was released by the Falcons during the 1999 preseason. He was later signed by the Dolphins who released him in the 2000 training camp.

== XFL ==
Bayne was selected (#76) by the Las Vegas Outlaws of the XFL. He played the nickel position on defense.

== Personal life ==
During his short tenure in the XFL, Bayne announced he would like to attend medical school once his career was over. He is the son of Ralph and Deborah Bayne.
