= Lonnie Palelei =

American football player (born 1970)

No. 68, 77, 66, 67
- Positions: Guard, tackle

Personal information
- Born: October 15, 1970 (age 56); Nuʻuuli, American Samoa
- Listed height: 6 ft 3 in (1.91 m)
- Listed weight: 310 lb (141 kg)

Career information
- High school: Blue Springs (Blue Springs, Missouri, U.S.)
- College: UNLV
- NFL draft: 1993: 5th round, 135th overall pick

Career history
- Pittsburgh Steelers (1993–1995); Cleveland Browns (1995); New York Jets (1997); New York Giants (1998); Philadelphia Eagles (1999); Las Vegas Outlaws (2001)

Career NFL statistics
- Games played: 44
- Games started: 26
- Fumble recoveries: 1
- Stats at Pro Football Reference

Si'ulagi Jack "Lonnie" Palelei (born October 15, 1970) is a Samoan American former professional football offensive guard and offensive tackle. He played college football at Purdue and UNLV. Selected by the Pittsburgh Steelers in the fifth round of the 1993 NFL draft, Palelei played in the National Football League (NFL) for the Steelers, New York Jets, New York Giants, and Philadelphia Eagles. In 2001, he played for the Las Vegas Outlaws of the XFL.
