= Mark Criner =

American football player and coach (born 1966)

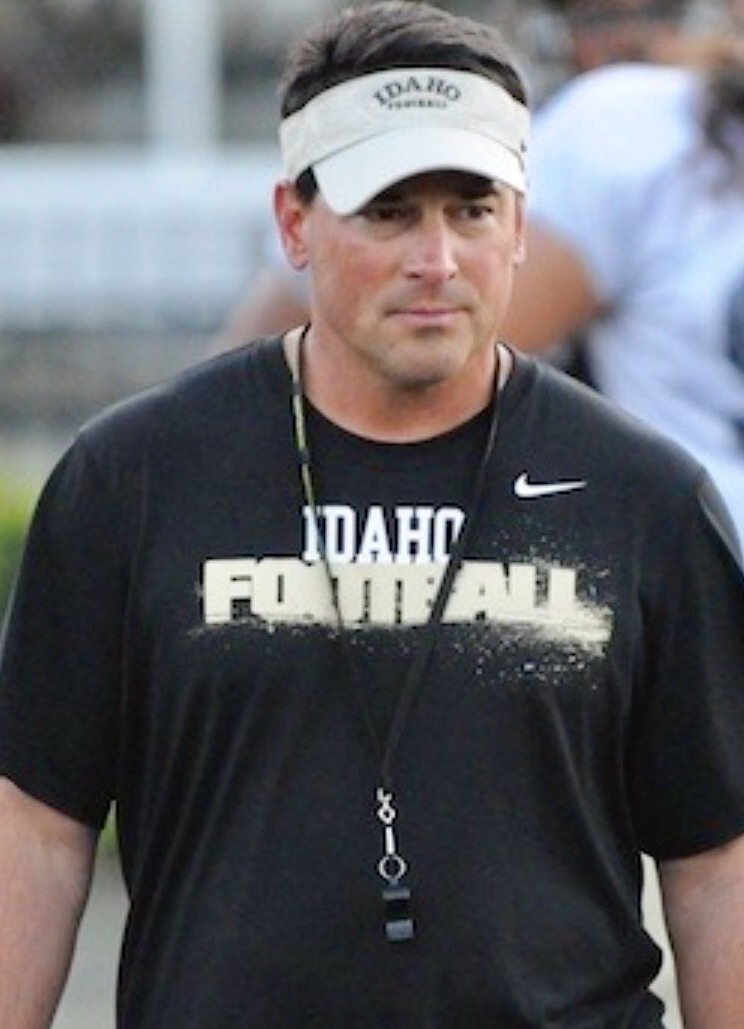
- Criner as defensive coordinator of the Idaho Vandals in 2012

Current position
- Title: Defensive Assistant
- Team: Oregon State
- Conference: Pac-12

Biographical details
- Born: December 18, 1966 (age 59); Fresno, California, U.S.

Playing career
- 1986: Iowa State
- 1988–1990: Boise State

Coaching career (HC unless noted)
- 1991–1992: Utah State (OLB)
- 1993–2000: Portland State (DC/LB/DB/ST)
- 2001: Las Vegas Outlaws (DC/DB)
- 2002: Cincinnati (LB)
- 2003: Cincinnati (co-DC/LB)
- 2004: Middle Tennessee (S)
- 2005: Middle Tennessee (DC/S)
- 2006: Minnesota (LB/ST)
- 2007–2012: Idaho (AHC/DC)
- 2013: Eastern Michigan (LB)
- 2014–2015: Lamar (LB)
- 2016: Rhode Island (LB/ST)
- 2017: CSU Pueblo (co-DC)
- 2018: LSU (DA)
- 2019: Atlanta Legends (ST/LB)
- 2019: Tulane (analyst)
- 2020: Seattle Dragons (LB / assistant ST)
- 2021–2024: Southern Miss (OLB)
- 2025-present: Oregon State (DA)

Mark Criner (born December 18, 1966) is an American football coach. He currently serves as the outside linebackers coach for the Southern Miss Golden Eagles football team. At the college football level, he served defensive coordinator for six seasons at the University of Idaho, and also held the same position at Middle Tennessee, Cincinnati, Portland State, the original XFL's Las Vegas Outlaws, and CSU Pueblo. He has also worked as a defensive assistant at Minnesota, Eastern Michigan, Utah State, Lamar, LSU, the Alliance of American Football's Atlanta Legends, and Tulane. He was also the linebackers coach and assistant special teams coach for the Seattle Dragons.

== Early life and playing career ==
Criner was born in Fresno, California. He attended Iowa State University and played there for one season, in 1986, under his father, Jim Criner, before transferring to Boise State University in 1987. At Boise State, he was a three-year letter winner and earned his bachelor's degree in physical education in 1990.

== Coaching career ==
=== Utah State ===
Criner began his coaching career in 1991 at Utah State, where he spent two seasons coaching outside linebackers under head coach Charlie Weatherbie.

=== Portland State ===
Following his tenure at Utah State, Criner coached at Portland State for eight seasons under head coach Tim Walsh. Criner served as secondary coach and special teams coordinator from 1993 to 1995 and defensive coordinator and linebackers coach from 1996 to 1999. Portland State made the NCAA Division II playoffs three times from 1993 to 1995 before transitioning to NCAA Division I-AA.

=== Las Vegas Outlaws ===
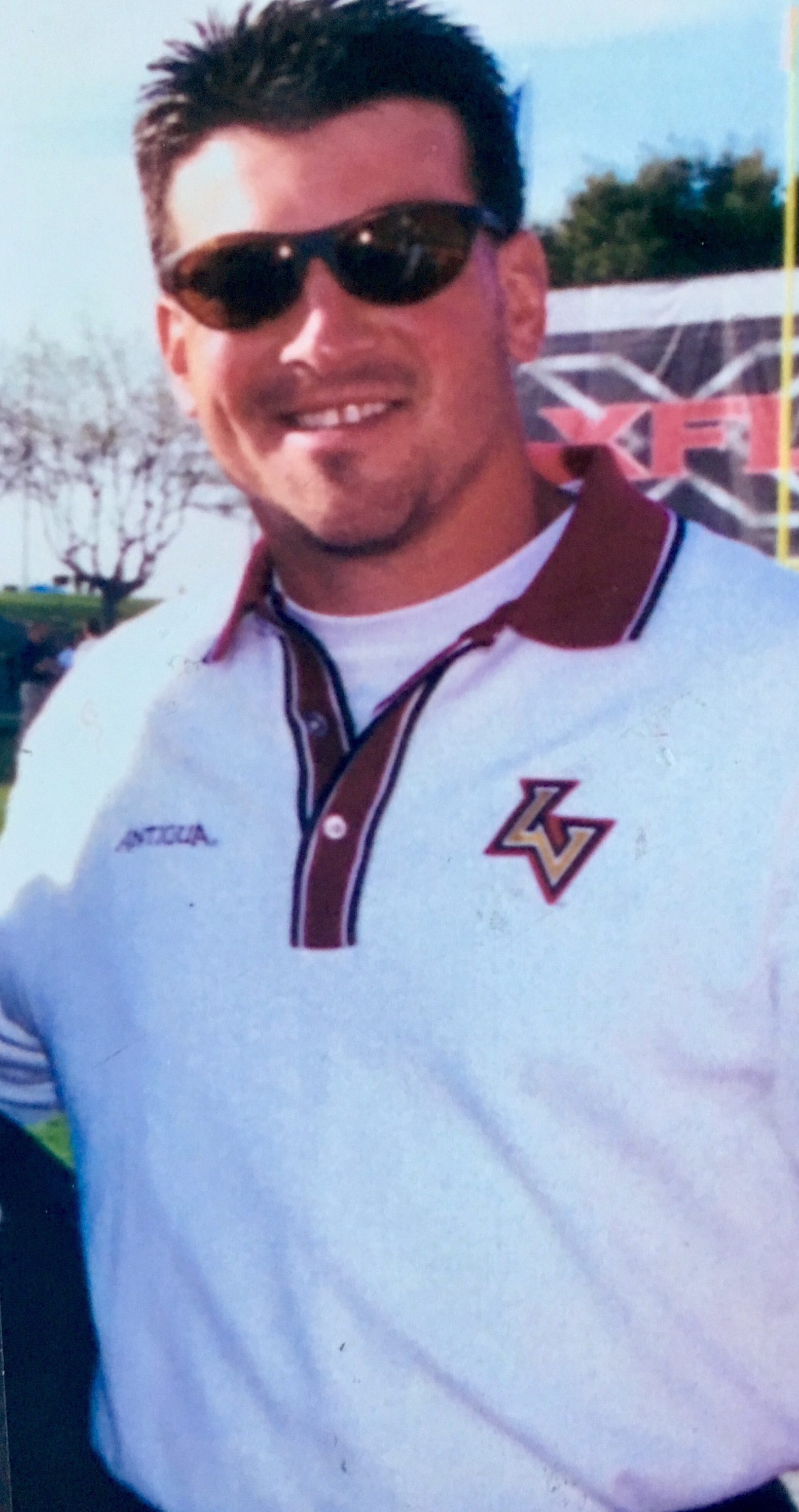
Criner as defensive coordinator of the Las Vegas Outlaws in 2001

Criner left Portland State in 2001 to join the staff of the Las Vegas Outlaws, a member of the XFL, under his father, Jim. Criner acted as defensive coordinator and secondary coach of the Outlaws and lead the league in scoring, rushing, and total defense.

=== Cincinnati ===
Following the folding of the XFL in 2002, Criner joined the Cincinnati football staff as co-defensive coordinator and linebackers coach under head coach Rick Minter. Criner's defense ranked in the top 30 in both seasons he was with the Bearcats.

=== Middle Tennessee ===
Criner served as defensive coordinator and safeties coach at Middle Tennessee from 2004 to 2005 under head coach Andy McCollum.

=== Minnesota ===
Criner spent the 2006 season at Minnesota as linebackers coach and co-special teams coordinator under head coach Glen Mason.

=== Idaho ===
Criner was then hired to be the Idaho's defensive coordinator under head coach Robb Akey. Criner would ultimately serve in this position for six seasons. His tenure saw Idaho's first bowl game in 11 seasons in 2009.

=== Eastern Michigan ===
Following his stint at Idaho, Criner joined the staff of Eastern Michigan as linebackers coach for one season in 2013 under head coach Ron English.

=== Lamar ===
For the 2014 and 2015 seasons, Criner coached linebackers at Lamar under head coach Ray Woodard. Lamar's 2014 squad ranked in the top 3 in the Southland Conference in total defense, red zone defense, sacks, 3rd down conversions, and passing yards allowed.

=== Rhode Island ===
In 2016, Criner was the linebackers and special teams coach for the Rhode Island Rams.

=== CSU Pueblo ===
For the 2017 season, he served as co-defensive coordinator for the CSU Pueblo ThunderWolves. After winning the conference title for the seventh consecutive year, CSU-P qualified for the 2017 playoffs.

=== LSU ===
In 2018, Criner was a defensive analyst for LSU, where they compiled a 10-3 record and finished 6th in the AP Poll.

=== Atlanta Legends ===
In spring 2019, Criner was the special teams coordinator and linebackers coach for the Atlanta Legends of the Alliance of American Football.

=== Tulane ===
In fall 2019, Criner served as an analyst for Tulane.

=== Seattle Dragons ===
In early 2020, Criner joined the staff of the XFL's Seattle Dragons as linebackers and assistant special teams coach.

=== Southern Miss ===
On December 15, 2020, Criner was announced as the outside linebackers coach on Will Hall's inaugural staff at Southern Miss.

== Personal life ==
Criner's father, Jim Criner, is a retired football coach with over 35 years of coaching experience. As head coach, his father won the 1980 NCAA Division I-AA Football Championship and 1996 NFL Europe World Bowl.

Mark and his wife, Angela, have four children: Madison, Calin, Jackson and Brooklyn. Calin played football at Eastern Washington University.
