= Kurt Gouveia =

American football player and coach (born 1964)

No. 54, 56
- Position: Linebacker

Personal information
- Born: September 14, 1964 (age 62); Honolulu, Hawaii, U.S.
- Listed height: 6 ft 1 in (1.85 m)
- Listed weight: 233 lb (106 kg)

Career information
- High school: Waianae (HI)
- College: BYU
- NFL draft: 1986: 8th round, 213th overall pick

Career history

Playing
- Washington Redskins (1986–1994); Philadelphia Eagles (1995); San Diego Chargers (1996–1998); Washington Redskins (1999); Las Vegas Outlaws (2001)

Coaching
- Hawaii (2003-04) Student assistant; Berlin Thunder (2005) Linebackers coach; Rhein Fire (2006) Linebackers coach; Berlin Thunder (2007) Linebackers coach; Lake Norman HS (NC) (2010) Defensive coordinator; Sacramento Mountain Lions (2011) Linebackers/Special Teams; Virginia Destroyers (2012) Linebackers; Hawaii (2014) Linebackers coach; Hawaii (2015) Outside linebackers coach; Hawaii (2015) Interim linebackers coach; Brevard (2017-18) Defensive coordinator/Linebackers; DC Defenders (2020) Linebackers coach; Brevard (2024) Linebackers/Senior defensive analyst

Awards and highlights
- 2× Super Bowl champion (XXII, XXVI); National champion (1984); Polynesian Football Hall of Fame (2014)

Career NFL statistics
- Tackles: 846
- Interceptions: 12
- Sacks: 5
- Stats at Pro Football Reference

Kurt Keola Gouveia (born September 14, 1964) is an American football coach and former linebacker who played 13 seasons in the National Football League (NFL) and one season in the XFL. During his career, he played for the Washington Redskins (1986–1994; 1999), the Philadelphia Eagles (1995), and the San Diego Chargers (1996–1998). In 2001, he also played for the Las Vegas Outlaws in the now-defunct XFL.

== Playing career ==
Gouveia played college football for Brigham Young University and was a member of their 1984 National Championship team. Gouveia was also a member of the Hawaii State Football Championship Team, Wai'anae High School, 1980. Gouvia played for BYU from 1983-1985, recording 224 tackles, 10 sacks, and 2 interceptions.

He was selected by the Redskins in the eighth round of the 1986 NFL draft with the 213th overall pick. Gouveia sustained a knee injury in training camp as a rookie and did not play during the 1986 NFL season.

In his 13 NFL seasons, Gouveia played in 184 games and his career totals include 73 starts in 151 regular season games, 819 tackles, ten interceptions, eight forced fumbles and two fumble recoveries.

Gouveia played a majority of his NFL career with the Redskins and was a member of both their 1987 and 1991 Super Bowl Championship teams. During the 1991 postseason, he made an interception in each Redskins' three playoff wins (including one in Super Bowl XXVI). He had only intercepted two passes in his career prior to that.

== Coaching career ==
After his retirement as a player, Gouveia coached linebackers at the professional level as the linebackers coach for the Sacramento Mountain Lions of the United Football League.

He later became the linebackers coach and defensive coordinator at Brevard College (NCAA Division III, Brevard, NC).

Gouveia was added to the coaching staff at Hawaii in 2014, serving as the team's linebackers coach for the season. He was moved to outside linebackers in 2015 following the hire of defensive coordinator Tom Mason, who coached the inside linebackers. He was re-named the linebackers coach for the final game of the 2015 season after Mason was assigned to an administrative role.

In 2019, he was named linebackers coach for the DC Defenders of the XFL.

== Personal life ==
Gouveia's oldest son, Landon Keola Gouveia, played football at the University of Hawaii and Catawba College. He is currently a high school head varsity football coach. Gouveia's son Jeron Gouveia-Winslow played football at Virginia Tech and was the safeties coach and co-special teams coordinator at Brevard College from 2017-2019 and is currently the Virginia Tech Assistant Director of Player Personnel.

Gouveia is of Portuguese and Hawaiian descent. Kurt is married to Julie Anne Gouveia, and they have a son, Dalton Olamana Gouveia; Dalton played linebacker for the University of Hawaii.
