= Rickey Brady =

American football player (born 1970)

No. 48, 89, 86
- Position: Tight end

Personal information
- Born: November 19, 1970 (age 55); Oklahoma City, Oklahoma, U.S.
- Listed height: 6 ft 4 in (1.93 m)
- Listed weight: 246 lb (112 kg)

Career information
- High school: Putnam City West (Oklahoma City)
- College: Oklahoma
- NFL draft: 1994: 6th round, 167th overall pick

Career history
- Los Angeles Rams (1994); New Orleans Saints (1995)*; Philadelphia Eagles (1995); New York Jets (1996)*; Dallas Cowboys (1996)*; Scottish Claymores (1997); Washington Redskins (1997)*; New Orleans Saints (1997)*; Tampa Bay Buccaneers (1998)*; Miami Dolphins (1999)*; Scottish Claymores (2000); Kansas City Chiefs (2000)*; Dallas Cowboys (2000)*; Las Vegas Outlaws (2001); Dallas Cowboys (2001)*
- * Offseason or practice squad member only

Awards and highlights
- First-team All-Big Eight (1993)

Career NFL statistics
- Games played: 1
- Stats at Pro Football Reference

Rickey Lee Brady Jr. (born November 19, 1970) is an American former professional football player who was a tight end in the National Football League (NFL). He was a member of the Los Angeles Rams, New Orleans Saints, Philadelphia Eagles, Dallas Cowboys, Miami Dolphins, Tennessee Titans, Tampa Bay Buccaneers, Scottish Claymores and the Las Vegas Outlaws of the XFL. He played college football for the Oklahoma Sooners.

== Early life ==
Brady attended Putnam City West High School located in Oklahoma City.

== College career ==
Brady attended the University of Oklahoma, where he was a four-year letterman on the Sooners football team. During his senior season in 1993, Brady earned first-team All-Big Eight Conference honors. He was also a member of the Oklahoma Sooners Men's Basketball team during the 1990–1991 season.

== Professional career ==
=== Los Angeles Rams ===
Brady was selected in the sixth round (167th overall) of the 1994 NFL draft by the Los Angeles Rams. He was released by the Rams on August 27, 1995.

=== New Orleans Saints ===
After being released by the Rams, the Saints signed him to the practice squad.

=== Philadelphia Eagles ===
On December 13, 1995, the Eagles activated Brady to the 53 man roster.

=== Dallas Cowboys (first stint) ===
In 1996, Brady was a member of the Cowboys training camp.

=== Scottish Claymores ===
In 1997, Brady was selected in the sixth round of the 1997 World League Draft. He played in all 10 games and recorded 20 catches for 322 yards.

=== Tampa Bay Buccaneers ===
Was a member of the training camp and was waived on August 25.

=== Tennessee Titans ===
Spent the 1998 season on the Titans roster, was released in 1999.

=== Miami Dolphins ===
Was signed in 1999 but was released for the start of the season.

=== Dallas Cowboys (second stint) ===
In 2000, Brady was signed as a free agent by the Dallas Cowboys. He was re-signed in the 2001 preseason.

=== Las Vegas Outlaws ===
Rickey Brady was the 37th pick of the 2001 XFL draft by the Las Vegas Outlaws.
