= Chuck Clements =

American football player (born 1973)

No. 7, 12, 10
- Position: Quarterback

Personal information
- Born: August 29, 1973 (age 53); Kingsville, Texas, U.S.
- Listed height: 6 ft 3 in (1.91 m)
- Listed weight: 214 lb (97 kg)

Career information
- High school: Huntsville (Huntsville, Texas)
- College: Houston (1992–1996)
- NFL draft: 1997: 6th round, 191st overall pick

Career history
- New York Jets (1997); Philadelphia Eagles (1998)*; Denver Broncos (1999)*; → Berlin Thunder (1999); Las Vegas Outlaws (2001); Ottawa Renegades (2002)
- * Offseason or practice squad member only

Awards and highlights
- First-team All-C-USA (1996); Second-team All-SWC (1995)
- Stats at Pro Football Reference

Chad "Chuck" Clements (born August 29, 1973) is an American former professional football player who was a quarterback for one season with the New York Jets of the National Football League (NFL). He was selected by the Jets in the sixth round of the 1997 NFL draft after playing college football for the Houston Cougars. He was also a member of the Philadelphia Eagles, Denver Broncos, Berlin Thunder, Las Vegas Outlaws and Ottawa Renegades.

== Early life ==
Chad Clements was born on September 29, 1973, in Kingsville, Texas. He attended Huntsville High School in Huntsville, Texas, where his father Joe was the head coach. He earned All-Greater Houston Class 5A, and Super Prep and Blue Chip Illustrated All-America honors during his high school football career. Clements also participated in basketball, baseball and track in high school.

== College career ==
Clements was a member of the Houston Cougars football team from 1992 to 1996, redshirting his first season in 1992 and then lettering four years from 1993 to 1996. He completed 124 of 239 passes (51.9%) for 1,216 yards, four touchdowns, and ten interceptions his redshirt freshman year in 1993. In 1994, he completed 91 of 162 passes (56.2%) for 838 yards, three touchdowns, and five interceptions. Clements recorded 245 completions on 437 passing attempts (56.1%) for 2,641 yards, 15 touchdowns, and 11 interceptions in 1995, earning second-team All-Southwest Conference (SWC) honors. His attempts, completions, completion percentage, and passing yards all led the SWC that season. He totaled 223 completions and 354 attempts (63.0%) for 2,417 yards, 21 touchdowns, and 13 interceptions his senior year in 1996, garnering first-team All-Conference USA (C-USA) recognition. His attempts, completions, completion percentage, passing yards, passing touchdowns, and interceptions led C-USA that year.

== Professional career ==
Clements was selected by the New York Jets in the sixth round, with the 191st overall pick, of the 1997 NFL draft. He officially signed with the team on July 17. He played in one game for the Jets during the 1997 season, recording two rushing attempts for negative three yards. He was released on August 22, 1998.

Clements was signed to the practice squad of the Philadelphia Eagles on November 5, 1998, and was released on December 7, 1998.

He signed with the Denver Broncos on January 15, 1999, and was later allocated to NFL Europe, where he played for the Berlin Thunder during the 1999 NFL Europe season. He completed 22 of 52 passes (42.3%) for 247 yards, one touchdown, and two interceptions for the Thunder. He was released by the Broncos on July 31, 1999.

Clements was selected by Las Vegas Outlaws of the XFL with the fifth overall pick in the 2001 XFL draft. He played in one game for the Outlaws in 2001 but did not record any statistics. He was teammates with similarly-named quarterback Ryan Clement during his time with the Outlaws.

He dressed in 18 games for the Ottawa Renegades of the Canadian Football League in 2002, completing 68 of 126 passes (54.0%) for 821 yards, one touchdown, and five interceptions while also rushing for 64 yards.

== Personal life ==
Clements's father Joe Clements was a football player and coach, and his brother Steve Clements played quarterback at BYU.
