= Darren Hambrick =

American football player (born 1975)

No. 54, 59, 56
- Position: Linebacker

Personal information
- Born: August 30, 1975 (age 51); Lacoochee, Florida, U.S.
- Listed height: 6 ft 2 in (1.88 m)
- Listed weight: 227 lb (103 kg)

Career information
- High school: Pasco (Dade City, Florida)
- College: Florida; South Carolina
- NFL draft: 1998: 5th round, 130th overall pick

Career history
- Dallas Cowboys (1998–2001); Carolina Panthers (2001); Cleveland Browns (2002); Tampa Bay Storm (2007)*
- * Offseason or practice squad member only

Awards and highlights
- Pasco County Athlete of the Decade

Career NFL statistics
- Tackles: 270
- Sacks: 3.5
- Interceptions: 3
- Stats at Pro Football Reference

Darren Hambrick (born August 30, 1975) is an American former professional football player who was a linebacker in the National Football League (NFL) for the Dallas Cowboys, Carolina Panthers and the Cleveland Browns. He played college football for the Florida Gators, before transferring to the South Carolina Gamecocks.

== Early life ==
Hambrick and his brother Troy attended Pasco High School, helping the football team win the 1992 Class 3A state championship. As a senior he posted 140 tackles at linebacker, receiving prep All-American, All-state and area defensive MVP honors.

In track, he was the first athlete in Florida history to qualify for 5 events at the state track meet. He high jumped 7'1 3/4" as a senior. He also practiced basketball.

In 1999, he was chosen as the best football player in Pasco County history by the St. Petersburg Times.

== College career ==
Hambrick accepted a football scholarship from the University of Florida. He was the only true freshman to start a game on defense for the team. He played in 13 games (3 starts) as a "Nickel" linebacker, receiving SEC All-Freshman honors after collecting 46 tackles (5 for loss), 2 interceptions and one sack.

As a sophomore, he had 59 tackles (3 for loss), 3 passes defensed, one sack, a forced fumble, one fumble recovery and 2 interceptions, including an 81-yard interception return for a touchdown against the University of Georgia. He also competed in the high jump and long jump for the Gators track team in 1993 and 1994.

Head coach Steve Spurrier kicked him off the team just prior to the 1995 Sugar Bowl, after he got into an altercation in which he struck another player in the jaw with broken glass.

Hambrick transferred to the University of South Carolina and sat out the 1995 season under NCAA transfer rules. As a junior, he was named honorable-mention All-SEC, after making 83 tackles (4 for loss), 1.5 sacks, 2 forced fumbles and one fumble recovery. He had a career-high 13 tackles against the University of Georgia.

Entering his senior season in 1997, he was named the starter at weakside linebacker, but fractured his left fibula in the season opener against the University of Central Florida. He missed 7 games before returning against the University of Tennessee. He started in the season finale against Clemson University, making three tackles.

== Professional career ==
Pre-draft measurables
Height	Weight	Arm length	Hand span
6 ft 1 7/8 in (1.88 m)	216 lb (98 kg)	33 5/8 in (0.85 m)	10 in (0.25 m)
All values from NFL Combine

=== Dallas Cowboys ===
Hambrick was selected by the Dallas Cowboys in the fifth round (130th overall) of the 1998 NFL draft, after dropping because of injuries concerns. As a rookie, he finished second on the team with 18 special teams tackles.

In 1999, he earned the starting job at strongside linebacker for most of the season (12 starts), finishing with 62 tackles (eighth on the team), 2.5 sacks, 3 quarterback pressures, 2 interceptions, a forced fumble and 10 special teams tackles. Prior to the final regular season game, the team convinced Quentin Coryatt to unretire and replace Hambrick in the starting lineup. Coryatt ended up getting hurt and Hambrick started in the Cowboys' playoff loss to the Minnesota Vikings. On January 26, 1999, he was arrested after fleeing from police officers who tried to pull him over for speeding.

Hambrick was seen as a rising player after being the team's leading tackler (154) in the 2000 season, but personal problems started to surface when he refused to come out of the final regular-season game and ignored head coach Dave Campo when he was approached after the game. He also engaged in a contract dispute with the Cowboys during the offseason, after feeling mistreated as a restricted free agent, when he was tendered an offer of $512,000.

After missing two of three minicamps in a protest over his salary, Campo demoted him to second string during the first two weeks of training camp in 2001. He was suspended for the Cowboys' final preseason game and the regular-season opener, because of a curfew violation while the team was in Mexico City to finish the preseason. Hambrick was released by the Cowboys on October 23, 2001, because of personal conflicts and violations of team rules, even though at the time he was fourth on the team with 22 tackles through the first five games of the year.

In Dallas he is best known for replying "What do voluntary mean?" when asked why he did not report to offseason workouts in 2001. His quote is often referenced in jest by the Dallas sports media.

=== Carolina Panthers ===
On October 24, 2001, he was claimed off waivers by the Carolina Panthers, starting in eight of nine games and leading the team in tackles twice. During his tenure with the team, he reported as stolen a paycheck from the Panthers he had already cashed. At the end of the season, he wasn't re-signed.

=== Cleveland Browns ===
Hambrick signed with the Cleveland Browns for the 2002 season to replace Jamir Miller at strongside linebacker, starting 15 games and helping the team reach the playoffs.

Although he was arrested on a grand theft charge, the Browns offered a $520,000 one-year contract which he turned down to negotiate better conditions. He was not re-signed, ending a five-year NFL career that was cut short because of his off-the-field issues.

=== Tampa Bay Storm ===
In 2007, he was signed to the practice squad of the Tampa Bay Storm of the Arena Football League, but was waived on June 6.

== NFL career statistics ==
Legend
**Bold**	Career high

=== Regular season ===
Year	Team	Games		Tackles				Interceptions				Fumbles			
Year	Team	GP	GS	Comb	Solo	Ast	Sck	Int	Yds	TD	Lng	FF	FR	Yds	TD
1998	DAL	14	0	0	0	0	0.0	0	0	0	0	0	0	0	0
1999	DAL	16	12	59	47	12	**2.5**	**2**	**44**	0	**25**	0	0	0	0
2000	DAL	16	16	**79**	**63**	**16**	1.0	0	0	0	0	0	0	0	0
2001	DAL	5	5	22	14	8	0.0	0	0	0	0	0	0	0	0
2001	CAR	9	8	53	42	11	0.0	0	0	0	0	0	**1**	0	0
2002	CLE	16	15	57	41	**16**	0.0	1	6	0	6	0	0	0	0
		76	56	270	207	63	3.5	3	50	0	25	0	1	0	0

=== Playoffs ===
Year	Team	Games		Tackles				Interceptions				Fumbles			
Year	Team	GP	GS	Comb	Solo	Ast	Sck	Int	Yds	TD	Lng	FF	FR	Yds	TD
1998	DAL	1	0	1	0	1	0.0	0	0	0	0	0	0	0	0
1999	DAL	1	1	**4**	**3**	1	0.0	0	0	0	0	0	0	0	0
2002	CLE	1	1	3	1	**2**	0.0	0	0	0	0	0	0	0	0
		3	2	8	4	4	0.0	0	0	0	0	0	0	0	0

== Personal life ==
Hambrick is the brother of former NFL running back Troy Hambrick and is also related to former Major League Pitcher Mudcat Grant.

Among a number of criminal incidents, on November 20, 2008, Hambrick was sentenced to 12 months probation after pleading guilty to misdemeanor battery. He then violated his probation in May 2010 and in July 2010 had his probation revoked and was sentenced to 30 days in the Pasco County Jail.
