= Florida State Road 575 =

State highway in Florida, United States

State Road 575
- SR 575 in red, CR 575 in blue

Route information
- Maintained by FDOT
- Length: 2.241 mi (3.607 km)

Major junctions
- South end: US 301 at Trilacoochee
- North end: Pasco-Hernando county line

Location
- Country: United States
- State: Florida

Highway system
- Florida State Highway System; Interstate; US; State; Former; Pre‑1945; Toll; Scenic
← SR 574	→ SR 579

State Road 575 (SR 575) is a short state road in and near Lacoochee, Florida. At both ends it continues as a county road.

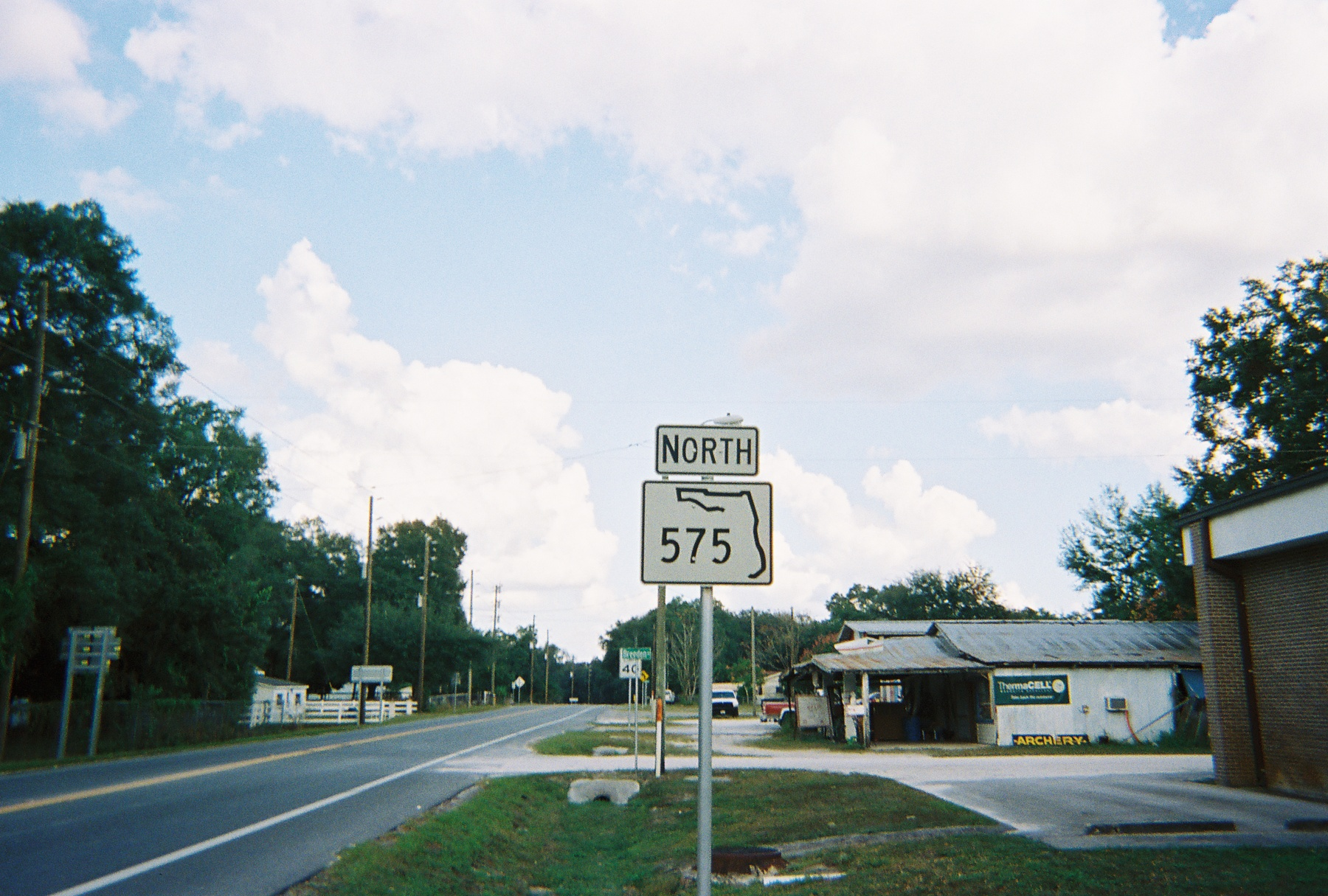
SR 575 in Lacoochee

== Major intersections ==
County	Location	mi	km	Destinations	Notes
Pasco		0.000	0.000	CR 41 (Blanton Road) / CR 41 Alt. south (Spring Valley Road)	
Pasco		6.1	9.8	US 98 (SR 700) – Brooksville, Dade City	Roundabout
Pasco	Trilacoochee	6.726	10.824	US 301 (SR 35) to US 98 south – St. Catherine, Dade City	South end of state maintenance
Pasco–Hernando county line		8.967	14.431	North end of state maintenance	
Hernando	Ridge Manor	11.016	17.729	SR 50 (Cortez Boulevard) – Ridge Manor, Groveland	
1.000 mi = 1.609 km; 1.000 km = 0.621 mi: Route transition

== County road extensions ==

Like many county roads in the state of Florida, it was originally a state highway that was downgraded to a county road during the great renumbering of 1980. CR 575 begins at the intersection of CR 41 (formerly SR 41) and CR 41 Alt. near Blanton, as Trilby Road and winds through rural northeastern Pasco County, first in a north–south direction, then in a more east–west direction. Entering Trilby itself, it crosses the Withlacoochee State Trail, then intersects with US 98 at a blinker-light intersection. At the intersection of US 301 at Trilacoochee it regains the state highway status it held long ago.

As SR 575 crosses the Hernando County Line near the Withlacoochee River, it reverts to a county road again on its way to State Road 50.
