= Troy Hambrick =

American football player (born 1976)

No. 35, 42, 47
- Position: Running back

Personal information
- Born: November 6, 1976 (age 49); Lacoochee, Florida, U.S.
- Listed height: 6 ft 1 in (1.85 m)
- Listed weight: 233 lb (106 kg)

Career information
- High school: Pasco (Dade City, Florida)
- College: South Carolina (1996–1998); Savannah State (1999)
- NFL draft: 2000: undrafted

Career history
- Dallas Cowboys (2000–2003); Oakland Raiders (2004)*; Arizona Cardinals (2004); Utah Blaze (2008)*
- * Offseason or practice squad member only

Career NFL statistics
- Rushing attempts: 536
- Rushing yards: 2,179
- Rushing touchdowns: 9
- Receptions: 46
- Receiving yards: 276
- Receiving touchdowns: 1
- Stats at Pro Football Reference

Troy Hambrick (born November 6, 1976) is an American former professional football player who was a running back in the National Football League (NFL) for the Dallas Cowboys and Arizona Cardinals. He played college football for the South Carolina Gamecocks and Savannah State Tigers.

== Early life ==
Hambrick and his brother Darren helped Pasco High School win the 1992 Class 3A state championship in football. As a senior running back, he tallied 1,731 rushing yards and 36 touchdowns, while earning All-state, Sunshine Athletic Conference Player of the Year honors. He also was named to the Florida Super 24 Senior Team and the Tampa Tribune Player of the Year.

He accepted a football scholarship from the University of South Carolina. In 1996, he became the first freshman in school history to rush for 100-yards in consecutive games, when he posted 120 yards against the University of Florida and 135 yards with 2 touchdowns against Clemson University to close the season. In that game, Hambrick and Duce Staley, became the second duo in school history to each rush for 100 yards in the same contest. He finished with 43 carries for 281 yards (6.5-yard average) and 5 touchdowns.

As a sophomore, although he was a backup behind Boo Williams, he still led the team in rushing with 115 carries for 604 yards (5.3-yard average) and 5 touchdowns. As a junior, he was named the starter, leading the team with 144 carries for 701 yards (4.9-yard average) and 4 touchdowns. Off the field issues led to his dismissal by then newly hired head coach Lou Holtz, before the start of the season on July 24, 1999. At the time, he ranked 18th on the school's all-time career rushing list.

He transferred to Savannah State University for his senior season. He became a starter at running back, posting 183 carries for 1,189 yards (6.5-yard average, 108.1 yards-per-game), 14 receptions for 111 yards, 18 touchdowns and led the SIAC Conference in scoring (116 points). He finished with school records for most rushing yards-game (181), most rushing touchdowns-game (4), most rushing touchdowns-season (18), most yards per carry-season (6.5), most points-season (116) and most total touchdowns-season (19).

== Professional career ==
Pre-draft measurables
Height	Weight	Arm length	Hand span	40-yard dash	10-yard split	20-yard split	20-yard shuttle	Three-cone drill	Vertical jump	Broad jump	Bench press
6 ft 0 1/8 in (1.83 m)	237 lb (108 kg)	32 3/8 in (0.82 m)	9 1/4 in (0.23 m)	4.70 s	1.69 s	2.75 s	4.44 s	7.48 s	34.5 in (0.88 m)	9 ft 10 in (3.00 m)	21 reps
All values from NFL Combine

=== Dallas Cowboys ===
Hambrick was signed as an undrafted free agent by the Dallas Cowboys after the 2000 NFL draft on June 1. On August 27, he was waived and signed to the practice squad two days later. On December 8, he was promoted to the active roster. In the season finale against the Tennessee Titans, he replaced starter Emmitt Smith in the fourth quarter and led the team in rushing with 6 carries for 28 yards (4.7-yard average). He finished the season with 3 special teams tackles.

In 2001, he had 9 starts at fullback in place of an injured Robert Thomas and 2 starts at running back. He registered 579 yards with a 5.1-yard average per carry, good for third place in the NFL and 8 special teams tackles (fifth on the team). In the third game against the Philadelphia Eagles, he had 10 carries for 107 yards (10.7-yard average), including an 80-yard run in the fourth quarter that was the fourth-longest in franchise history. In the seventh game against the New York Giants, he started in place of an injured Smith, registering 30 carries for 77 yards. The next game against the Atlanta Falcons, he had 20 carries for 127 yards (6.4-yard average).

His play in limited appearances created a controversy whether he should start ahead of Smith, which in turn affected the relationship between the two players. In 2002, his numbers decreased to 79 carries for 317 yards (4.0-yard average) and one touchdown, but still excelled in special teams, finishing second on the team with 17 tackles.

Hambrick is best known for being the player that replaced Smith as the Cowboys starter in the 2003 season. As the featured running back, using his size and deceptive speed, he rushed for career highs with 275 carries for 972 yards and 5 touchdowns, helping the team back to the playoffs for the first time since 1998. During that season against the Washington Redskins, he ran 33 times for 189 yards, which at the time was the third-most rushing yards in a game by a running back in franchise history, only Tony Dorsett and Smith had better games. On May 13, 2004, he was waived after the Cowboys drafted Julius Jones in the second round and also took into consideration his production (3.5 yards per carry).

=== Oakland Raiders ===
On May 17, 2004, the Oakland Raiders signed him as a free agent, but within a month he was traded to the Arizona Cardinals along with defensive end Peppi Zellner, in exchange for a sixth round draft choice (#182-Cedric Houston) in the 2005 NFL draft.

=== Arizona Cardinals ===
During the 2004 season in a twist of fate, he ended up once again backing up Smith with the Arizona Cardinals. Hambrick played in the first 10 games, collecting 63 carries for 283 yards and one touchdown, before spraining his foot and being placed on the Injured reserve list. He was released on August 22, 2005.

=== Utah Blaze ===
On November 9, 2007, he signed with the Utah Blaze of the Arena Football League in an attempt to come back, but was waived within a month after being arrested.

== NFL career statistics ==
Legend
**Bold**	Career high

=== Regular season ===
Year	Team	Games		Rushing					Receiving				
Year	Team	GP	GS	Att	Yds	Avg	Lng	TD	Rec	Yds	Avg	Lng	TD
2000	DAL	3	0	6	28	4.7	13	0	0	0	0.0	0	0
2001	DAL	**16**	11	113	579	**5.1**	**80**	2	4	62	**15.5**	**27**	0
2002	DAL	**16**	0	79	317	4.0	18	1	**21**	**99**	4.7	14	0
2003	DAL	**16**	**16**	**275**	**972**	3.5	42	**5**	17	**99**	5.8	13	0
2004	ARI	10	0	63	283	4.5	62	1	4	16	4.0	9	**1**
		61	27	536	2,179	4.1	80	9	46	276	6.0	27	1

=== Playoffs ===
Year	Team	Games		Rushing					Receiving				
Year	Team	GP	GS	Att	Yds	Avg	Lng	TD	Rec	Yds	Avg	Lng	TD
2003	DAL	**1**	**1**	**8**	**29**	**3.6**	**16**	0	**1**	**3**	**3.0**	**3**	0
		1	1	8	29	3.6	16	0	1	3	3.0	3	0

== Personal life ==
Hambrick's brother Darren was a linebacker in the NFL for the Dallas Cowboys, Cleveland Browns and Carolina Panthers. His uncle is former Major League Baseball pitcher Mudcat Grant.

In September 2005, Hambrick was arrested on domestic abuse charges, which were dropped after prosecutors declined to file formal charges. In 2007, he was arrested for selling cocaine. He later was sentenced to five years in prison, but was released in March 2011 after entering a drug treatment program.
