= Janarion Grant =

American gridiron football player (born 1993)

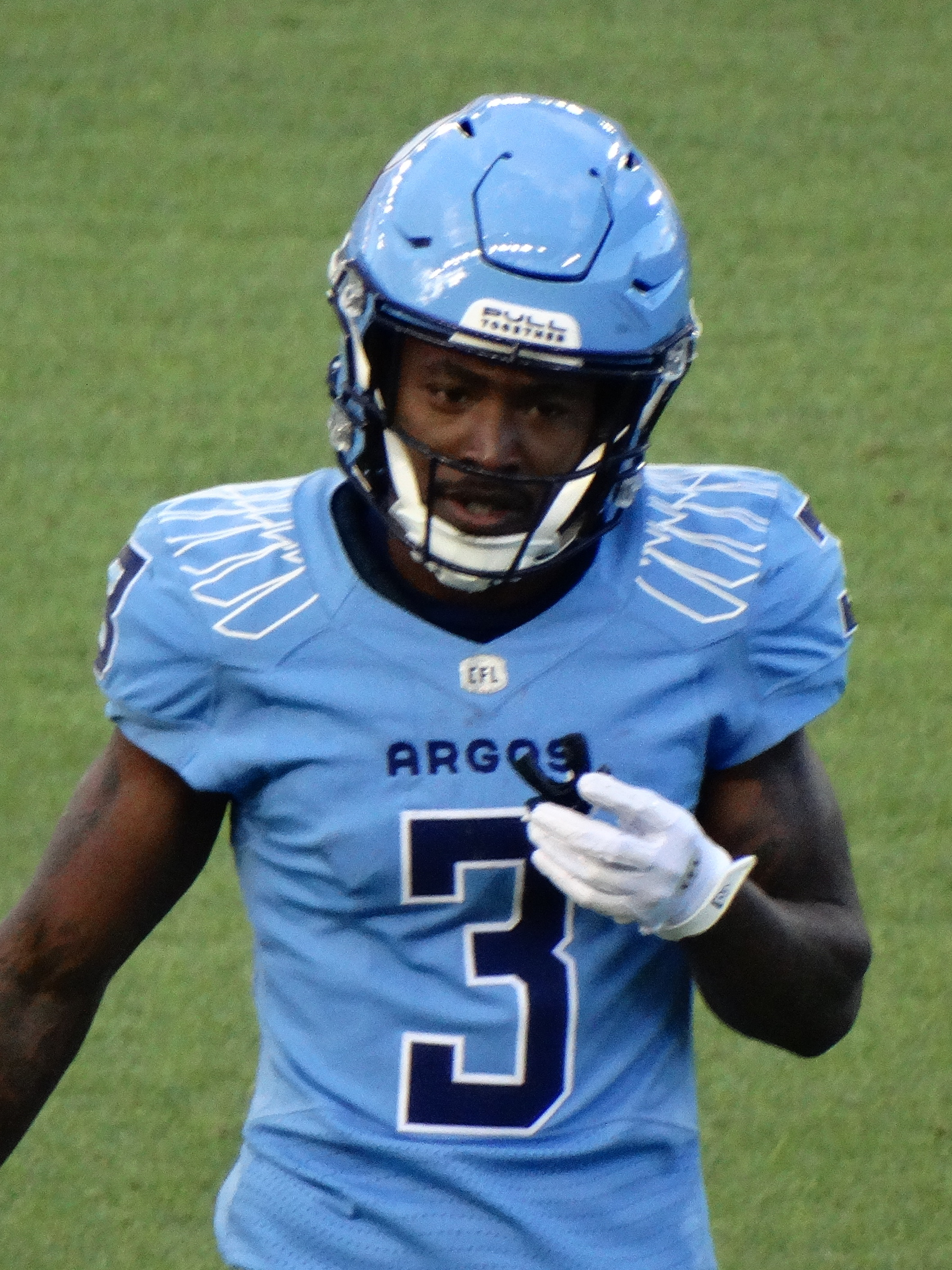
- Grant with the Toronto Argonauts in 2024

No. 3 – Toronto Argonauts
- Position: Return specialist
- Roster status: Active
- CFL status: American

Personal information
- Born: November 20, 1993 (age 32); Trilby, Florida, U.S.
- Listed height: 5 ft 9 in (1.75 m)
- Listed weight: 175 lb (79 kg)

Career information
- High school: Pasco (Dade City, Florida)
- College: Rutgers
- NFL draft: 2018: undrafted

Career history
- Baltimore Ravens (2018); Hamilton Tiger-Cats (2019)*; Winnipeg Blue Bombers (2019–2023); Toronto Argonauts (2024–present)
- * Offseason or practice squad member only

Awards and highlights
- 3× Grey Cup champion (2019, 2021, 2024); John Agro Special Teams Award (2024); 2× CFL All-Star (2022, 2024); CFL West All-Star (2022); 2x CFL East All-Star (2024, 2026); Second-team All-Big Ten (2015); Second-team All-AAC (2013)

Career NFL statistics
- Kick return yards: 56
- Punt return yards: 52
- Return touchdowns: 0
- Stats at Pro Football Reference

Career CFL statistics as of 2026
- Receptions: 24
- Receiving yards: 153
- Receiving touchdowns: 1
- Kickoff return yards: 5,178
- Punt return yards: 4,737
- Missed field goal return yards: 611
- Total return touchdowns: 16
- Stats at CFL.ca

Janarion Grant (born November 20, 1993) is an American professional football return specialist for the Toronto Argonauts of the Canadian Football League (CFL). He is a three-time Grey Cup champion after winning with the Winnipeg Blue Bombers in 2019 and 2021 and with the Argonauts in 2024. He played college football for the Rutgers Scarlet Knights and signed with the Baltimore Ravens of the National Football League (NFL) as an undrafted free agent in 2018.

== Early life ==
Janarion Grant was born on November 20, 1993, in Trilby, Florida. He attended Pasco High School in Dade City, Florida.

== College career ==
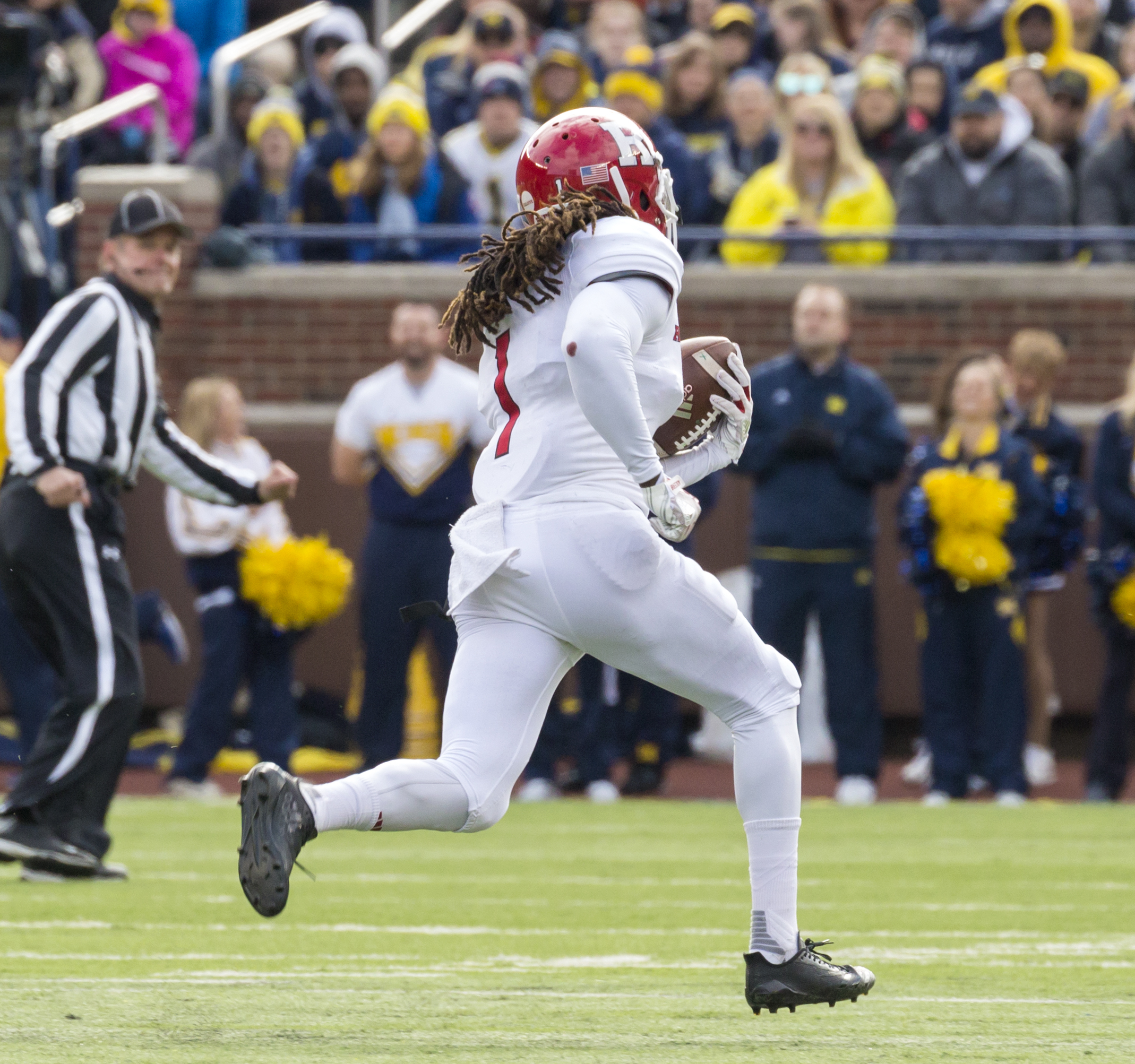
Grant with the Scarlet Knights in 2017

Grant attended and played college football for the Rutgers Scarlet Knights from 2013 to 2017. He was a returner in college over five seasons. He recorded 115 kick returns for 2,857 net yards and five kick return touchdowns to go along with 52 punt returns for 588 net yards and three punt return touchdowns.

== Professional career ==
Pre-draft measurables
Height	Weight	Arm length	Hand span	Wingspan	40-yard dash	10-yard split	20-yard split	20-yard shuttle	Three-cone drill	Vertical jump	Broad jump	Bench press
5 ft 9 1/4 in (1.76 m)	177 lb (80 kg)	30 1/8 in (0.77 m)	9 in (0.23 m)	5 ft 11 1/8 in (1.81 m)	4.56 s	1.70 s	2.64 s	4.43 s	7.07 s	32.0 in (0.81 m)	10 ft 2 in (3.10 m)	22 reps
All values from Pro Day

=== Baltimore Ravens ===
Grant signed with the Baltimore Ravens as an undrafted free agent on May 7, 2018. He made the Ravens final roster as the team's primary kick and punt returner. However, on September 22, 2018, Grant was waived by the Ravens after two fumbles in as many games. He was re-signed to the practice squad on September 25, 2018.

=== Hamilton Tiger-Cats ===
Grant signed with the Hamilton Tiger-Cats on June 3, 2019. He was added to the practice roster after training camp, but was released on June 18, 2019.

=== Winnipeg Blue Bombers ===
Grant was signed by the Winnipeg Blue Bombers on July 23, 2019. He scored his first and second CFL touchdowns on August 8, 2019, in his first CFL game on punt returns against the Calgary Stampeders. His 222 punt-return yards in the game set a Blue Bombers franchise record and ranked as the third-highest single-game in CFL history behind only Gizmo Williams 232 in 1991 and Keith Stokes 224 vs Montreal in 2002. Grant finished the season with three punt return touchdowns and also had one missed FG returned for 61 yards. Grants abilities on special teams helped the team as they would go on to win the 2019 Grey Cup against the Hamilton Tiger-Cats.

After the CFL canceled the 2020 season due to the COVID-19 pandemic, Grant chose to opt-out of his contract with the Blue Bombers on August 31, 2020. He signed a one-year contract extension with Winnipeg on February 4, 2021. Once again, Grant brought his electric punt return skills to the field as he averaged 11 yards a punt return through the 2021 season. This included another touchdown return for 63 yards against the BC Lions on October 23. In the CFL West Division final against Saskatchewan, Grant returned a missed field goal for 58 yards to the Winnipeg 39 yard-line. This led to an Andrew Harris touchdown as the Bombers would win 21–17 on their way to their second consecutive Grey Cup. Grant and the Bombers would win the 108th Grey Cup, their second title in a row with a 33–25 victory in overtime against the Hamilton Tiger-Cats. After becoming a free agent in February 2022, Grant and the Bombers agreed to a new contract on April 13, 2022. He played for the Blue Bombers for two more seasons before becoming a free agent on February 13, 2024.

=== Toronto Argonauts ===
On May 28, 2024, it was announced that Grant had signed with the Toronto Argonauts. He played in 16 regular season games in 2024 where he had 67 punt returns for 989 yards and three touchdowns, 41 kickoff returns for 1,000 yards and one touchdown, and five missed field goal returns for 106 yards. After leading the league in punt return yards, punt return average, and total return touchdowns as well as finishing second in kickoff return average, Grant was named the CFL's Most Outstanding Special Teams Player. He also played in all three post-season games, including the 111th Grey Cup where he had four punt returns for 33 yards, one kickoff return for 25 yards, and two catches for negative four yards in the Argonauts' 41–24 victory over the Winnipeg Blue Bombers.

In the 2025 season, Grant played in 15 regular season games where he recorded 52 punt returns for 666 yards, 50 kickoff returns for a career-high 1,145 yards and one touchdown, and five missed field goal returns for 107 yards. His 1,925 all-purpose yards were the fourth-highest in the league in 2025. As a pending free agent, he re-signed with the Argonauts on February 6, 2026.

In the 2026 season, in one of his highlights of the year, Grant returned a Sergio Castillo missed field goal 128 yards for a touchdown in the 30–28 victory against the Winnipeg Blue Bombers on September 25.

== Career statistics ==
=== CFL ===
Year	Team	G	Kick Ret	Yds	Avg	Long	TD	Punt Ret	Yds	Avg	Long	TD
2019	WPG	11	25	600	23.0	74	0	41	591	14.4	83	3
2020	WPG	Season cancelled										
2021	WPG	6	12	283	23.6	33	0	34	375	11.0	63	1
2022	WPG	16	31	782	25.2	97	1	63	817	13.0	94	2
2023	WPG	8	19	426	22.4	43	0	36	473	13.1	92	1
2024	TOR	16	41	1,000	24.4	103	1	67	989	14.8	96	3
2025	TOR	15	50	1,145	22.9	93	1	52	666	12.8	50	0
2026	TOR	16	42	942	22.4	38	0	55	826	15.0	68	2
CFL totals		88	220	5,178	23.5	103	3	348	4,737	13.6	96	12

=== College ===
Year	School	Class	Pos	G	Kick Ret	Yds	Avg	TD	Punt Ret	Yds	Avg	TD
2013	Rutgers	FR	WR	12	21	517	24.6	1	17	156	9.2	1
2014	Rutgers	SO	WR	11	36	910	25.3	0	6	45	7.5	0
2015	Rutgers	JR	WR	12	40	984	24.6	3	12	167	13.9	1
2016	Rutgers	SR	WR	4	6	195	32.5	1	7	112	16.0	1
2017	Rutgers	SR	WR	7	12	251	20.9	0	10	108	10.8	0
Career	Rutgers				115	2,857	24.8	5	52	588	11.3	3
