= Florida State Road 41 =

Highway in Florida, US

State Road 41 and County Road 41

Route information
- Maintained by FDOT and Pasco County Department of Public Works

Major junctions
- South end: SR 43 / CR 580 in Temple Terrace
- North end: CR 41 in Zephyrhills

Location
- Country: United States
- State: Florida
- County: Pasco

Highway system
- Florida State Highway System; Interstate; US; State; Former; Pre‑1945; Toll; Scenic
← US 41	→ SR 43

State Road 41 (SR 41) is the secret designation for U.S. Route 301 between Temple Terrace and Zephyrhills, Florida. It is known as Fort King Highway in Hillsborough County, and Fort King Road in Pasco County.

== Route description ==
State Road 41 begins at Harney Road (County Road 580/43) at the embankment of a former railroad overpass, and curves underneath Interstate 75 with no access. It serves as the eastern terminus for State Road 582, as well as the unmarked County Road 582 in Thonotosassa. The road continues northeastward rejoining the aforementioned abandoned railroad line as both run through Hillsborough River State Park. Like much of US 301 between Bushnell and Bradenton, State Road 41 also runs parallel to the DeSoto Trail.

Entering Pasco County, the road changes its name from Fort King Highway to Fort King Road. In Zephyrhills, it becomes concurrent with State Road 39 which eventually replaces it as the secret route of US 301.

== Former sections ==
=== County Road 41 ===

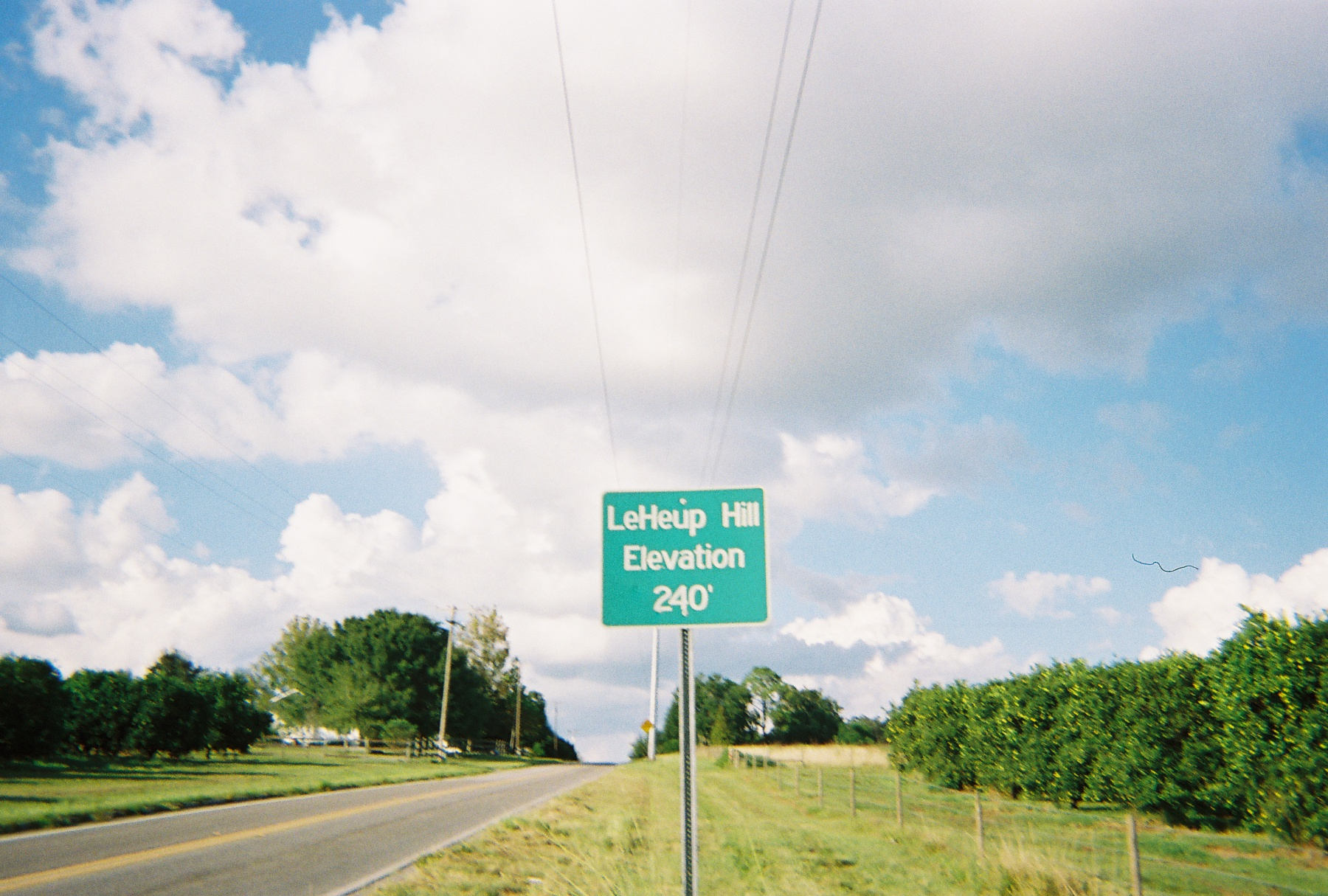
CR 41 in Pasco County climbs LeHeup Hill, among others.

In Zephyrhills, Route 41 breaks away as a County Road that was originally a state road. From this point to the intersection with Daughtery Road, it runs along the west side of a former Seaboard Air Line Railroad line which was abandoned in the early-1970's. Between Zephyrhills and Dade City, the road is known mainly as Fort King Road. At one point it runs on top of LeHeup Hill, which at 240 feet (73 m) is one of the highest points in Pasco County. After crossing SR 52 (formerly County Road 52 Alternate), it runs towards the back of Pasco High School. Within the Dade City Limits, it becomes South 17th Street. Concurrent with CR 52 between South 17th Street and North 21st Street, and then immediately with County Road 578 between Saint Joe Road and Lock Street.

Northwest of Dade City CR 41 becomes Blanton Road, where it winds up, down, and around more hills. It serves as the terminus of both ends of County Road 41 Alternate one end of which also includes the terminus of County Road 575. At the interchange with Interstate 75 at Exit 293 (formerly Exit 60) it becomes a two-lane divided highway, but only in the vicinity of the ramps. In between, it narrows back down to a two-lane bridge over I-75 itself. CR 41 curves back north again near an orange grove at the intersection of County Road 577 (Lake Iola Road), where it enters Hernando County.

=== County Road 541 ===

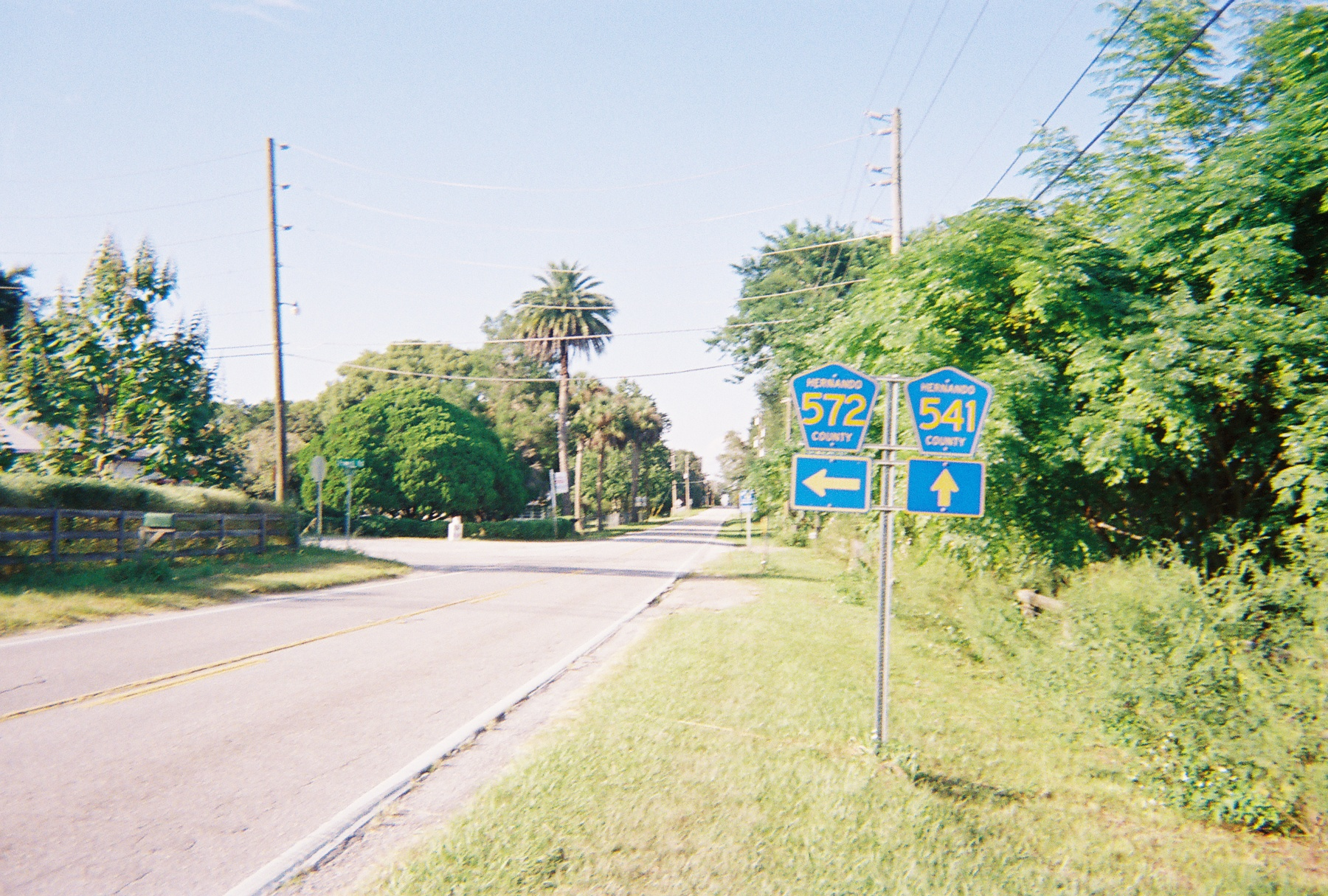
CR 541 at CR 572, to Spring Hill.

North of the Hernando County Line, County Road 41 becomes County Road 541 as Spring Lake Highway. Once a former segment of State Road 41 and later County Road 41, it continues to move up and down the hills of eastern Hernando County, through orange groves, former orange groves, and hay farms. The road serves as the eastern terminus of CR 576 (Hayman Road, formerly CR 420) and CR 572 (Powell Road) in Spring Lake. North of CR 572, one major orange grove remains intact. It ends at US 98/SR 50 in Hill 'n Dale, where it leads to a realigned section of County Road 484.

== Major intersections ==
County	Location	mi	km	Destinations	Notes
Hillsborough	East Lake-Orient Park	0.000	0.000	Elm Fair Boulevard - State Fairgrounds, Amphitheatre	north end of SR 43; south end of US 301 overlap
Hillsborough	East Lake-Orient Park			US 92 (SR 600) to I-4 / I-75 – Orlando, Tampa, St. Petersburg	Exit 7 (I-4)
Hillsborough	Temple Terrace Junction			Harney Road	
Hillsborough				SR 582 west (Fowler Avenue) to I-75 – Temple Terrace, University of South Florida, Busch Gardens	
Hillsborough				CR 579 south – Thonotosassa	
Pasco				Chancey Road - Dade City	to CR 535, eastern bypass of Zephyrhills
Pasco				SR 39 south – Crystal Springs, Plant City	south end of SR 39 overlap
Pasco	Zephyrhills			SR 54 west (5th Avenue) to I-75 – Land o' Lakes	
Pasco	Zephyrhills			To SR 54 west / 6th Street	De facto south to west connecting road to SR 54
Pasco	Zephyrhills			US 301 / SR 39 north (Gall Boulevard)	north end of US 301 / SR 39 overlap; end of state maintenance
Pasco	Zephyrhills			CR 54 (Eiland Boulevard) – Zephyrhills West, Branchborough	
Pasco	Dade City			SR 52 (Clinton Avenue) – St. Leo, Clinton Heights	
Pasco	Dade City			CR 52 east (Meridian Avenue) – Downtown	south end of SR 52 overlap
Pasco	Dade City			CR 52 west (21st Street) to I-75 south – San Antonio	north end of SR 52 overlap
Pasco	Dade City			CR 578 west (Suwannee Way) – St. Joseph	former south end of CR 578 overlap
Pasco	Dade City			Lock Street - Southeast Bottling and Beverage	former CR 578 east
Pasco	Dade City			CR 41 Alt. north (Spring Valley Road) – Blanton	
Pasco	Blanton			CR 575 north (Trilby Road) / CR 41 Alt. south (Spring Valley Road) – Trilby, Blanton	
Pasco	Jessamine			I-75 / SR 93 – Ocala, Tampa	Exit 293 (I-75)
Pasco				CR 577 south – San Antonio	
Hernando	Spring Lake			CR 541 north (Spring Lake Highway) – Spring Lake, Hill 'n Dale	North end of Pasco CR 41; Begin Hernando CR 541
1.000 mi = 1.609 km; 1.000 km = 0.621 mi: Concurrency terminus; Route transition

== Related route ==
County Road 41 Alternate
- Location: Dade City-Blanton

County Road 41 Alternate is the bannered route of CR 41 in the northwestern outskirts of Dade City. It was originally a suffixed alternate of State Road 35 called County Road 35B, and included Frazee Hill Road.
