= Pasco High School =

Pasco High School may refer to:

- Pasco High School (Washington), United States
- Pasco High School (Florida), United States
