= Edwinola =

Historic 1912 hotel building in Dade City, Florida

Coordinates: 28°21′55.5″N 82°11′27.2″W

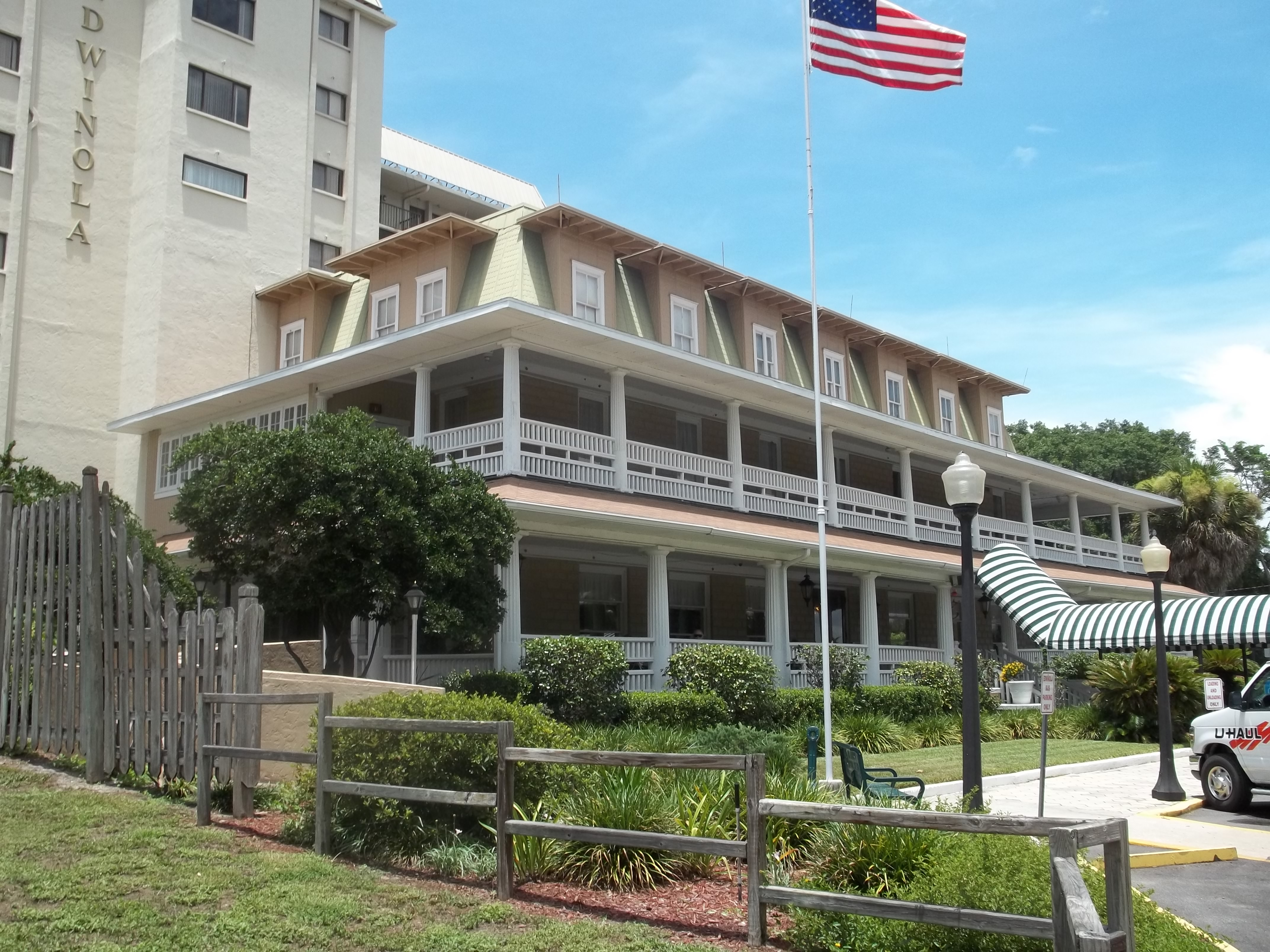
The Edwinola with newer attached apartment complex

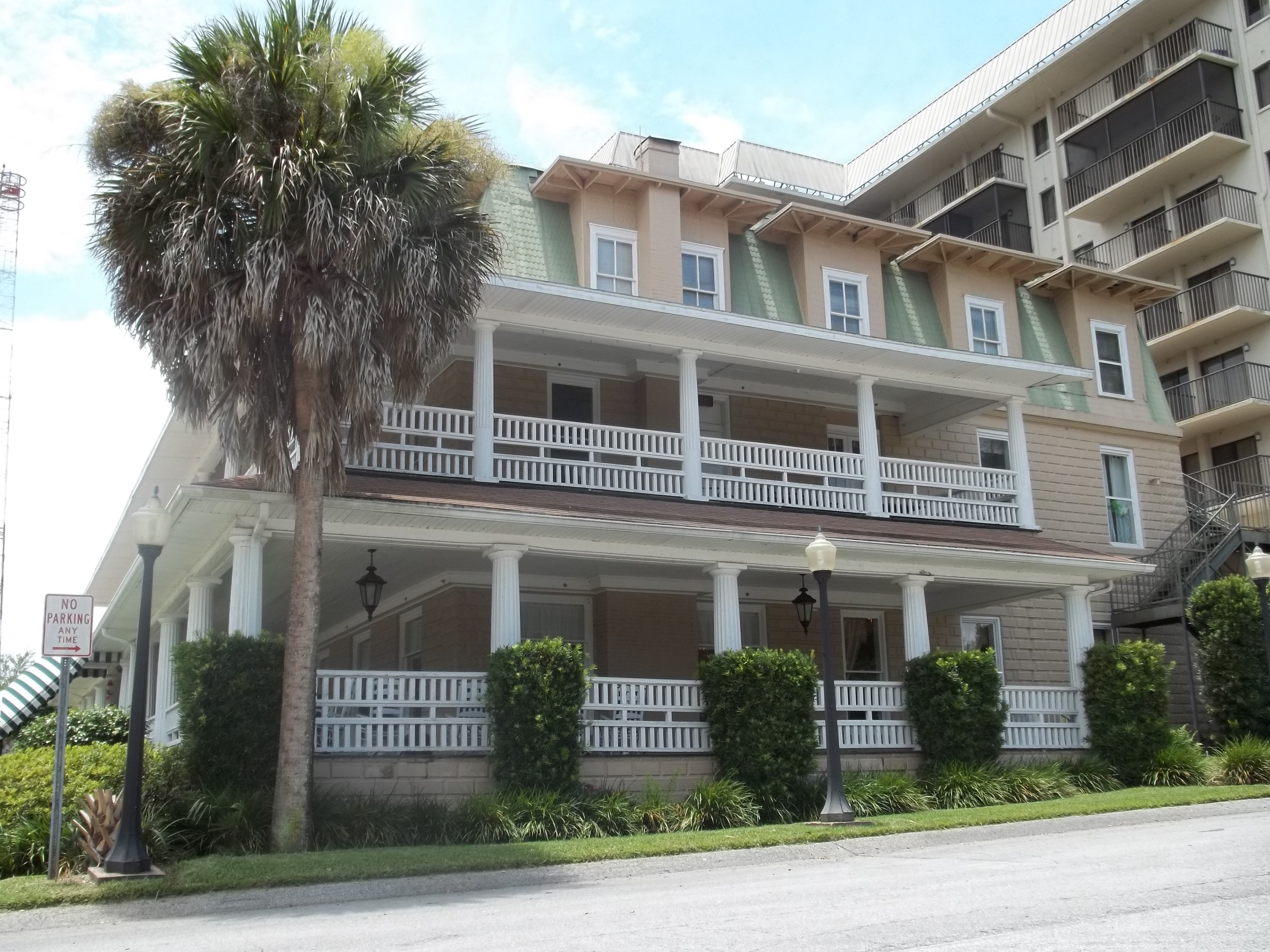
Side view of the Edwinola in 2011

The Edwinola is a historic 1912 hotel building in Dade City, Florida being used as part of a retirement residence, with independent and assisted living apartments attached behind it, and for the Edwinola Restaurant.

The hotel once offered Model T shuttle service from the local Seaboard Railroad station. In 2012 the building's 100th anniversary was celebrated.

== History ==
A three-story building with Doric columns, wrap-around porches and a Mansard roof, it was named after owners Edwin and Lola Gasque. After World War II it struggled to compete against newer hotels and was converted into a residence for the Gasque family in the 1950s and 1960s. In 1975 it was purchased by Marlene and Robert Sumner who turned it into a restaurant. In the 1980s it became a retirement home with an 8 story building attached.

== Fate ==
The Dade City News reported that the Edwinola would probably close in September 2016, as soon as its current residents can find other assisted living facilities to relocate to.

The assisted living center closed in 2016, and reopened in May, 2017 under new ownership and management. It is located at 14235 Edwinola Way.
