= Domonic Brown =

American baseball player (born 1987)

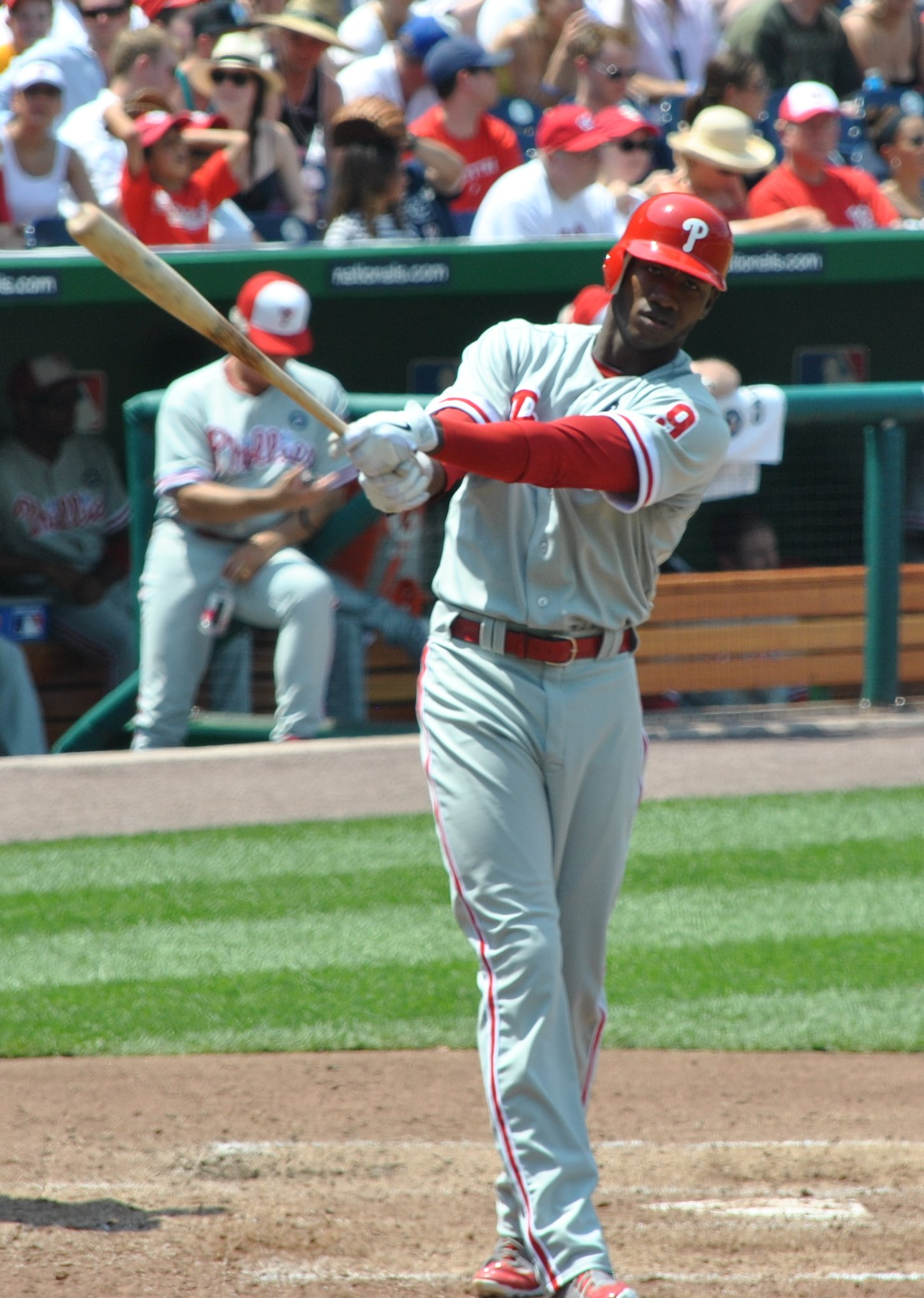
- Brown with the Philadelphia Phillies
- Outfielder
- Born: September 3, 1987 (age 39); Zephyrhills, Florida, U.S.
- Batted: Left Threw: Left

MLB debut
- July 28, 2010, for the Philadelphia Phillies

Last MLB appearance
- September 2, 2015, for the Philadelphia Phillies

MLB statistics
- Batting average: .246
- Home runs: 54
- Runs batted in: 229
- Stats at Baseball Reference

Teams
- Philadelphia Phillies (2010–2015)

Career highlights and awards
- All-Star (2013)

Domonic Larun Brown (born September 3, 1987), is an American former professional baseball outfielder. He made his Major League Baseball (MLB) debut with the Philadelphia Phillies in 2010, after being named the Phillies' top prospect in 2009 and the top prospect in all of MLB, in 2010 by Baseball America.

== Professional career ==
=== Minor leagues ===
==== 2006–2007 ====
Brown was selected by the Phillies in the 20th round of the 2006 Major League Baseball draft out of Redan High School in Stone Mountain, Georgia. Since he moved to the Atlanta area from Pasco High School in Dade City, Florida, Brown had "fallen off some teams' radars" prior to the draft. He participated in a private batting session with Phillies representatives at a local park, and after making one adjustment to his swing, scouting director Marti Wolever "couldn't believe what [they] were seeing". Brown planned to attend the University of Miami to play wide receiver for the Hurricanes, but the Phillies offered him a $200,000 signing bonus to choose baseball instead.

After the draft, Brown was assigned to the Phillies' Gulf Coast League (GCL) affiliate, where he batted .214 and collected one home run, seven runs batted in (RBI), and thirteen stolen bases—which tied him for the team lead with Adrian Cardenas—during the 2006 season. For 2007, he earned a promotion to the Williamsport Crosscutters of the New York – Penn League. He played in 74 games with Williamsport, batting in 39 runs and collecting 21 extra-base hits. His 27 walks were second on the team, and his .295 batting average was the team's best among players with more than 10 appearances. On defense, he played in the most games for the team in both center field and right field. His performance allowed him a late promotion to the advanced-A Clearwater Threshers, where he batted .444 with one home run and seven RBI in eleven plate appearances.

==== 2008–2009 ====
In 2008, Brown played the entire season with the Phillies' A-level affiliate, the Lakewood BlueClaws. In 591 plate appearances (second on the team), Brown collected a .291 batting average, 54 RBI, 23 doubles, and 9 home runs. He played 69 games in center field and 59 in right, amassing 208 putouts, 12 outfield assists, and participating in 4 double plays.

Before the 2009 season, Baseball America ranked Brown the 48th-best prospect in the country, as well as the top prospect in the Phillies' farm system. He played at three levels during the 2009 season, spending most of the season with Clearwater. He batted .303/.386/.517 for the Threshers, notching 12 doubles, 11 home runs, and 44 RBI in 66 games played. His batting average was tied for second-highest on the team, and his 11 home runs were tied for the third-highest total. He played in 65 of his 66 games in right field, making nine assists and five errors. After promotion to the Double-A Reading Phillies, Brown batted .279 with 20 RBI and 8 stolen bases; he also hit three home runs and four triples (tied for the team lead). Including a short stint with the GCL Phillies, Brown accumulated a .299 batting average for the year, along with a .377 on-base percentage and a .504 slugging percentage. His 14 home runs were the most in a single season in his minor league career to that point, as were his 44 extra-base hits. After the season, Brown's name was included in trade rumors related to pitcher Roy Halladay; however, the Phillies refused to part with him, including outfield prospect Michael Taylor instead.

==== 2010 ====
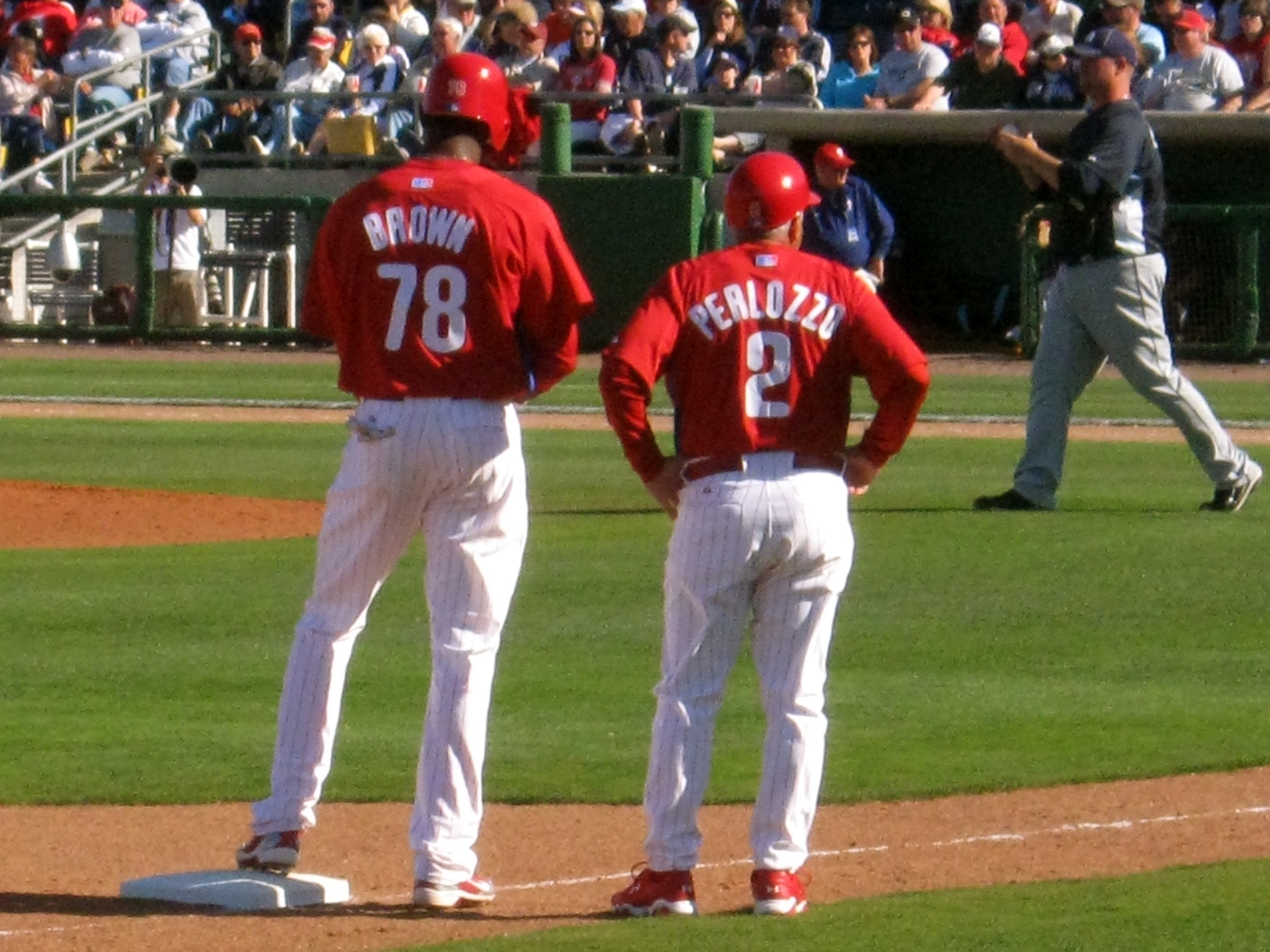
During 2010 spring training, Brown converses with third base coach Sam Perlozzo.

Brown was invited to Major League spring training in 2010, during which MLB.com, Major League Baseball's official website, ranked him the 14th-best prospect in the minor leagues. In a game against the Tigers, he hit two home runs—one against Justin Verlander—and added a bases-loaded infield single to collect a third RBI. Of his home run against Verlander, shortstop Jimmy Rollins said, "That was legit. Big league stuff. (Phillies manager Charlie Manuel) [sic] was there that morning trying to teach him how to get to his power." First baseman Ryan Howard nicknamed Brown the "Total Package", noting that "I've seen him take batting practice" and that "[he's] got pop to all fields". The game was his last in Major League camp, as he was sent down after its completion.

Though it was speculated that he would begin the year with the Triple-A Lehigh Valley IronPigs, he was assigned to Reading for the start of the 2010 season, where he batted .333 in his first seven games. He drove in one of two runs for the Double-A club on an RBI triple to back Phillippe Aumont's no-hit bid on April 25. He was promoted to the IronPigs on June 25, after he batted .318 with 16 doubles, 3 triples, 15 homers, 47 RBI, and 12 stolen bases in 65 games. Chuck LaMar, the Phillies' assistant general manager, said that Brown "is just now starting to scratch the surface on his ceiling as a potential Major League player", praising his hand–eye coordination and his power. He batted .405 in his first 12 games in Triple-A, hitting four home runs and batting in eleven. At midseason, Brown was selected to represent the United States in the 2010 All-Star Futures Game. He started for the U.S. team, but left in the first inning after experiencing tightness in his hamstring muscle running from the batter's box on an infield single. Brown was expected to return to the Lehigh Valley lineup after the All-Star break. Through July 27, he batted .327 with 20 home runs and 68 RBI between Reading and Lehigh Valley.

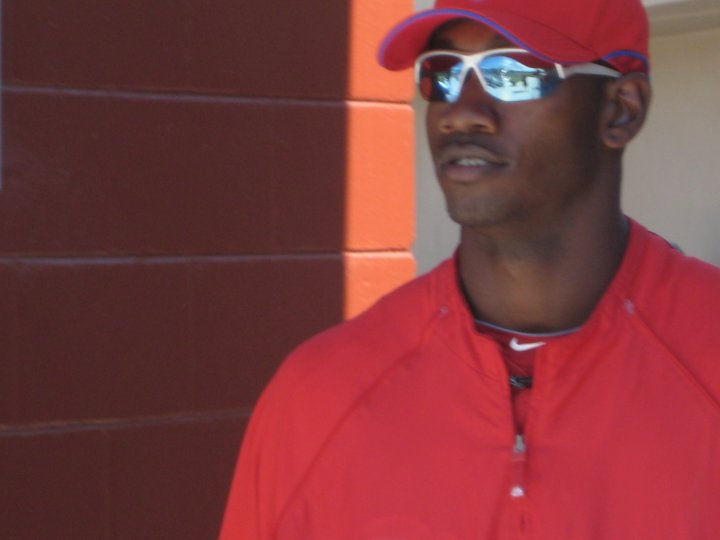
Brown during 2010 spring training

=== Philadelphia Phillies ===
Brown was called up to the Phillies on July 28, 2010, after Shane Victorino was placed on the disabled list. He made his debut that night against the Arizona Diamondbacks, playing right field and batting sixth. He hit an RBI double in his first at-bat, scoring Jayson Werth, and scored his first run on a fielder's choice by Wilson Valdez. He notched his second hit with a single in his third at-bat, scoring again on a double by Carlos Ruiz. He batted in Raúl Ibañez with a sacrifice fly in the bottom of the seventh inning for his second career RBI, finishing with two hits in three official at-bats. Brown received a standing ovation from the crowd prior to his first plate appearance; he later said that the experience "was great" and that he "wasn't thinking about that at all". On August 10, Brown hit his first home run in a game against the Los Angeles Dodgers.

==== 2011 ====
Brown entered the 2011 season as the number four prospect in baseball. During spring training, Brown broke his right hamate bone and had surgery to remove the fractured hook. He was sent down to the Lehigh Valley IronPigs, the Phillies Triple-A minor league affiliate, on July 29, 2011, to open a roster spot for Hunter Pence. He would bat .261 in 41 games with 3 home runs and 15 RBIs total that season. Brown was called back up to the Phillies' expanded roster in September, but only appeared twice. He was not on the Phillies playoff roster.

==== 2012 ====
Brown's 2012 season saw him play 56 games in the majors and 60 games in the minors for Philadelphia's Triple-A affiliate, the Lehigh Valley IronPigs (batting .286 with 5 HRs and 28 RBIs). He hit .235 with 5 homers and 26 runs driven in during his stint with the Major League club. He started the season off in the Triple-A minor leagues, as General Manager Ruben Amaro wanted Brown to get regular playing time, rather than spotty and unpredictable playing time. He was called up to the majors in July, but did not play too well, hitting .235.

Brown suffered from several injuries in 2012, including right knee inflammation and a left hamstring injury. Brown injured his right knee while running backward to make a catch; he played on the knee for a few weeks before an MRI revealed a knee strain. He returned with a knee brace, but soon after injured his left knee since he put too much weight on it to compensate for his right knee's weakness.

Brown's play was considered mediocre by many. Ryan Dinger of Phillies Nation commented that Brown "showed flashes of being the player everyone thinks he can be", but that "he was also plagued by long stretches of ineffectiveness".

==== 2013 ====
Going into his age-25 season in 2013, Brown was slated to be the Phillies' starting left fielder after impressing in spring training. He won his first National League Player of the Week award from May 20 to 26. Then, he hit six home runs over the course of five games, two of which were in one game on May 29 against the Red Sox, and two of which were hit in one game again two days later on May 31 against the Brewers. Brown won his second consecutive NL player of the week after he hit 7 home runs and knocked in 13 runs during the week May 27 to June 2. He was also awarded NL player of the month for May as he clubbed 12 home runs during the month. Brown finished the season batting .272/.324/.494, with 27 home runs, and 83 RBI. He was selected as a reserve for the 2013 All-Star Game.

==== 2014 ====
Sporting News rated Brown the worst defensive left fielder in the major leagues after three blatant blunders during June. He appeared in a career-high 144 games in 2014, batting .235 with 10 home runs and 63 RBI.

==== 2015 ====
Brown moved back to his natural position, right field, for the 2015 season. He also sought to build on some momentum he built late in the season in an effort to live up to his perceived potential. On October 19, 2015, Brown was outrighted off of Philadelphia's 40-man roster. He ended the season with a .228 batting average, 5 home runs and 25 RBI in 63 games played.

=== Toronto Blue Jays ===
On February 25, 2016, Brown signed a minor league contract with the Toronto Blue Jays that included an invitation to spring training. In 126 games for the Triple–A Buffalo Bisons, he batted .239/.303/.336 with seven home runs and 41 RBI. Brown elected free agency following the season on November 7.

=== Colorado Rockies ===
On January 31, 2017, Brown signed a minor league deal with the Colorado Rockies organization. In 48 games for the Triple–A Albuquerque Isotopes, he batted .304/.328/.449 with three home runs and 21 RBI. Brown was released by the Rockies organization on July 19.

=== Sultanes de Monterrey ===
On March 3, 2018, Brown signed with the Sultanes de Monterrey of the Mexican League. In 30 games, he slashed .211/.323/.431 with seven home runs and 17 RBI. Brown was released by Dos Laredos on April 29.

=== Tecolotes de los Dos Laredos ===
On June 26, 2018, he signed with the Tecolotes de los Dos Laredos of the Mexican League. With the team in 2018, he batted .274/.343/.480 with 11 home runs and 48 RBI. Brown returned to the club in 2019, playing in 88 contests and hitting .295/.366/.570 with 25 home runs and 75 RBI. He did not play in a game for the team in 2020 due to the cancellation of the Mexican League season because of the COVID-19 pandemic. On July 3, 2020, Brown was released by the Tecolotes.

== Post-baseball career ==
As of 2020, Brown was working as a coach at Athletes Academy, a training facility in East Norriton.

== Personal life ==
Brown and his family live in suburban Philadelphia.
