= Trilacoochee, Florida =

Unincorporated community in Florida, U.S.

Coordinates: 28°26′45″N 82°11′19″W

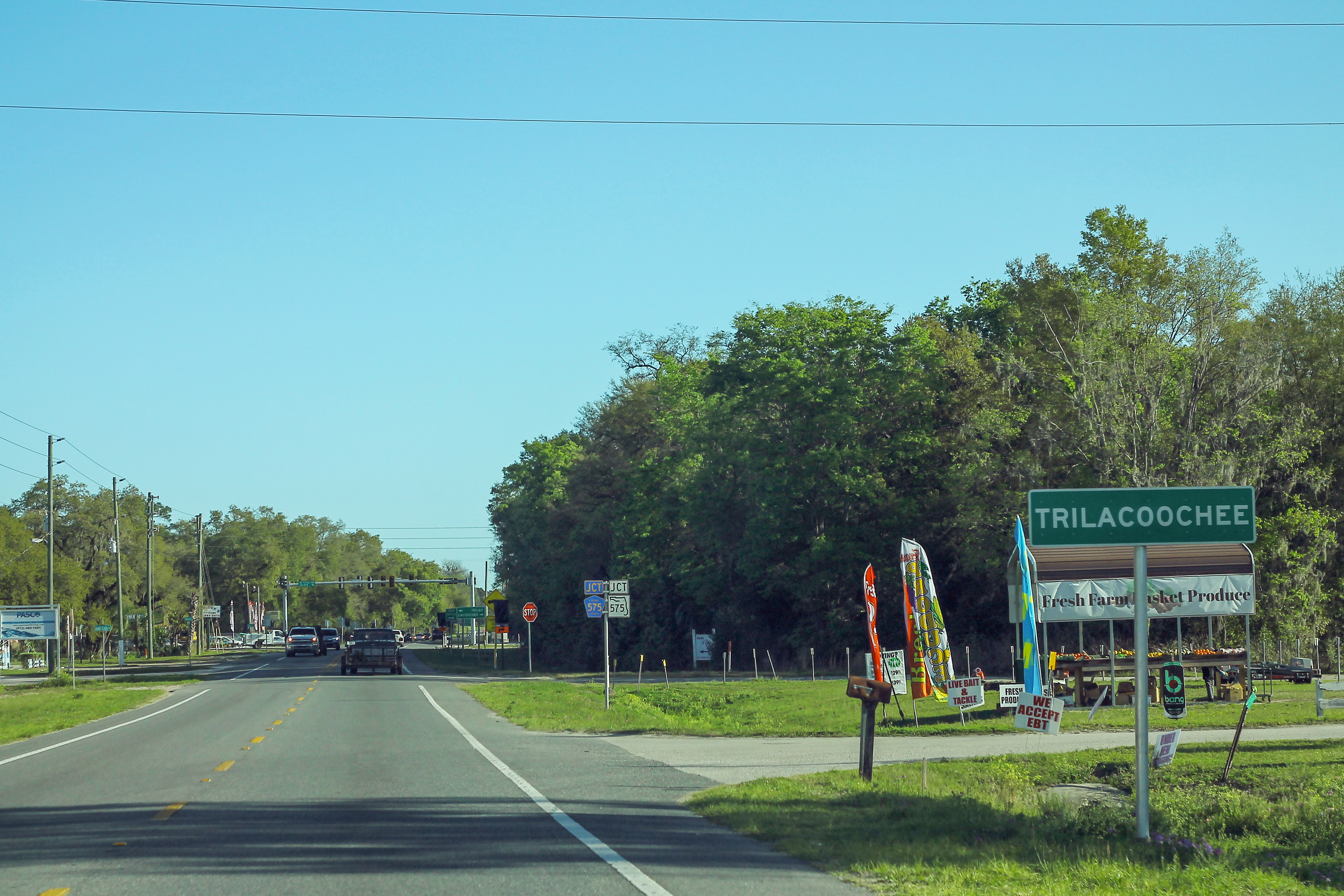
Sign on U.S. Route 301 North, Trilacoochee, Florida

Trilacoochee is an unincorporated community in the northeast corner of Pasco County, Florida, United States. It is at the northern terminus of the US 301 and US 98 multiplex. It has a non-profit "Greater Trilby Community Association" which exists to improve the life and quality of residents of the Trilby, Trilacoochee and Lacoochee area. The ZIP Code for this community is 33523, which it shares with Dade City.

== Geography ==
Trilacoochee is bordered by Trilby to the northwest, Lacoochee to the northeast, Blanton to the west, the Green Swamp to the east, and Dade City to the south.

== History ==
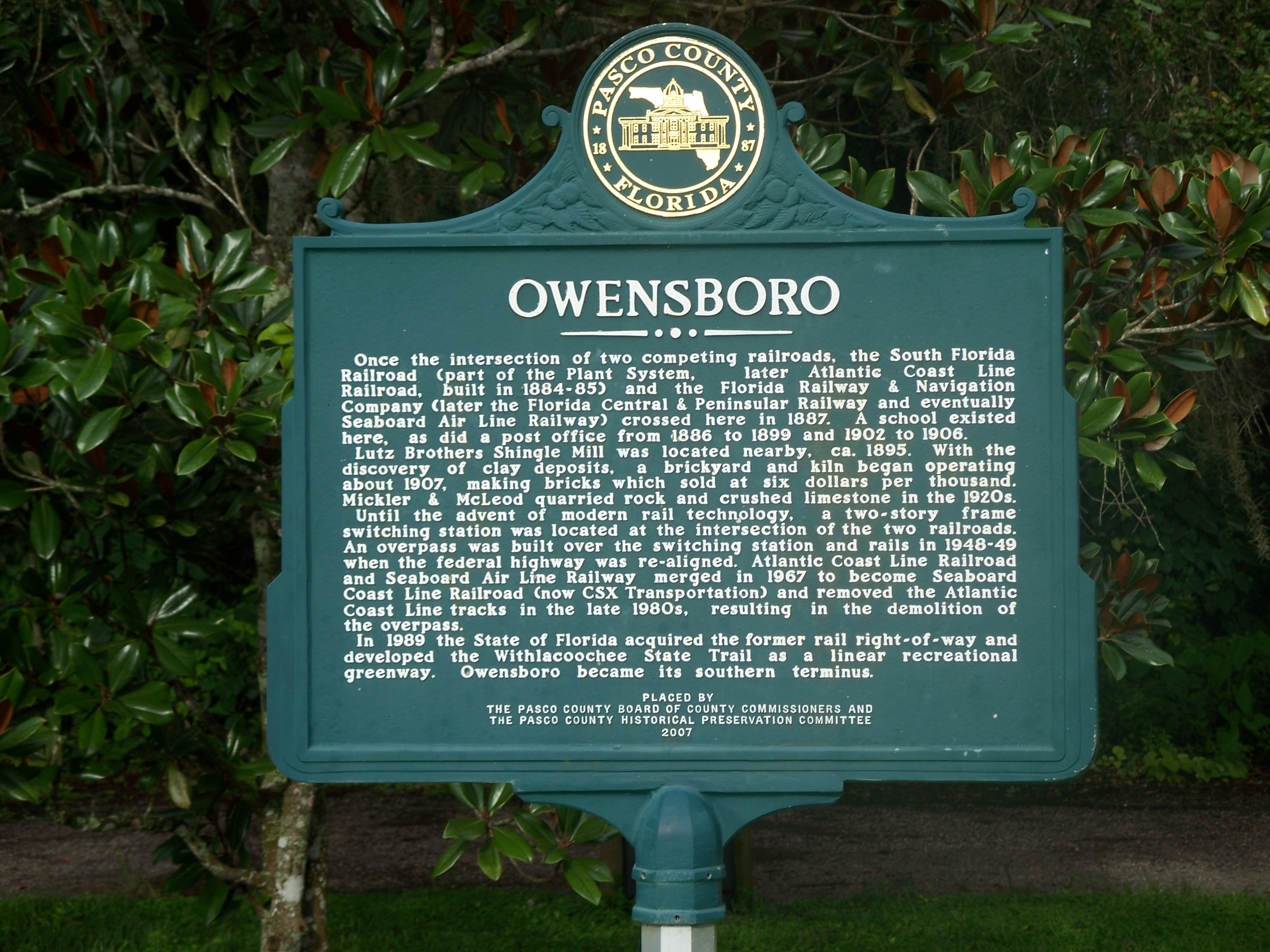
This is a historic marker at the location of what was Owensboro near Trilby in Pasco County Florida

Trilacoochee was originally known as Owensboro Junction, where the Atlantic Coast Line Railroad and Seaboard Air Line railroad crossed paths. The lines were originally built by two other competing railroads, the South Florida Railroad between 1884 and 1885 which was acquired by the Atlantic Coast Line, and the Florida Railway and Navigation Company in 1887, which was bought by the Florida Central and Peninsular Railway and eventually the Seaboard Air Line. In time the town gained a school, two post offices, a shingle mill, and after clay deposits were discovered in 1907, a brick yard and kiln were installed. A housing development known as Trilcoochee Gardens was begun in the 1920s, named because it was between Trilby and Lacoochee. During the 1930s the community became known as Trilcoochee, but by the 1940s the spelling Trilacoochee was used more frequently.

The state highway that became SR 35 was realigned during 1948 and 1949, and US 301 took over the route. ACL built a bridge over both the SAL tracks, the switching station, and the new section of the road. The old sections have since been renamed Old Trilby Road. US 98 was extended through Pasco County in 1952, and joined US 301 in a multiplex from Trilacoochee to Clinton Heights south of Dade City. Since then, the road has been lined with independent farms, restaurants, automotive garages, and motels.

In 1967, the ACL and SAL merged to form the Seaboard Coast Line Railroad, which brought the junction into decline. The southwest tracks formerly owned by the SAL were removed during the 1970s, and in 1989 the northwest tracks formerly owned by the ACL were removed, as well as the ACL train trestle. The right-of-way for the former ACL segment to the northwest later became the southern terminus of the Withlacoochee State Trail. Today, the existing line is known as the CSX's Wildwood Subdivision, which is part of the S Line.
