= Josh Johnson (cornerback) =

American gridiron football player (born 1989)

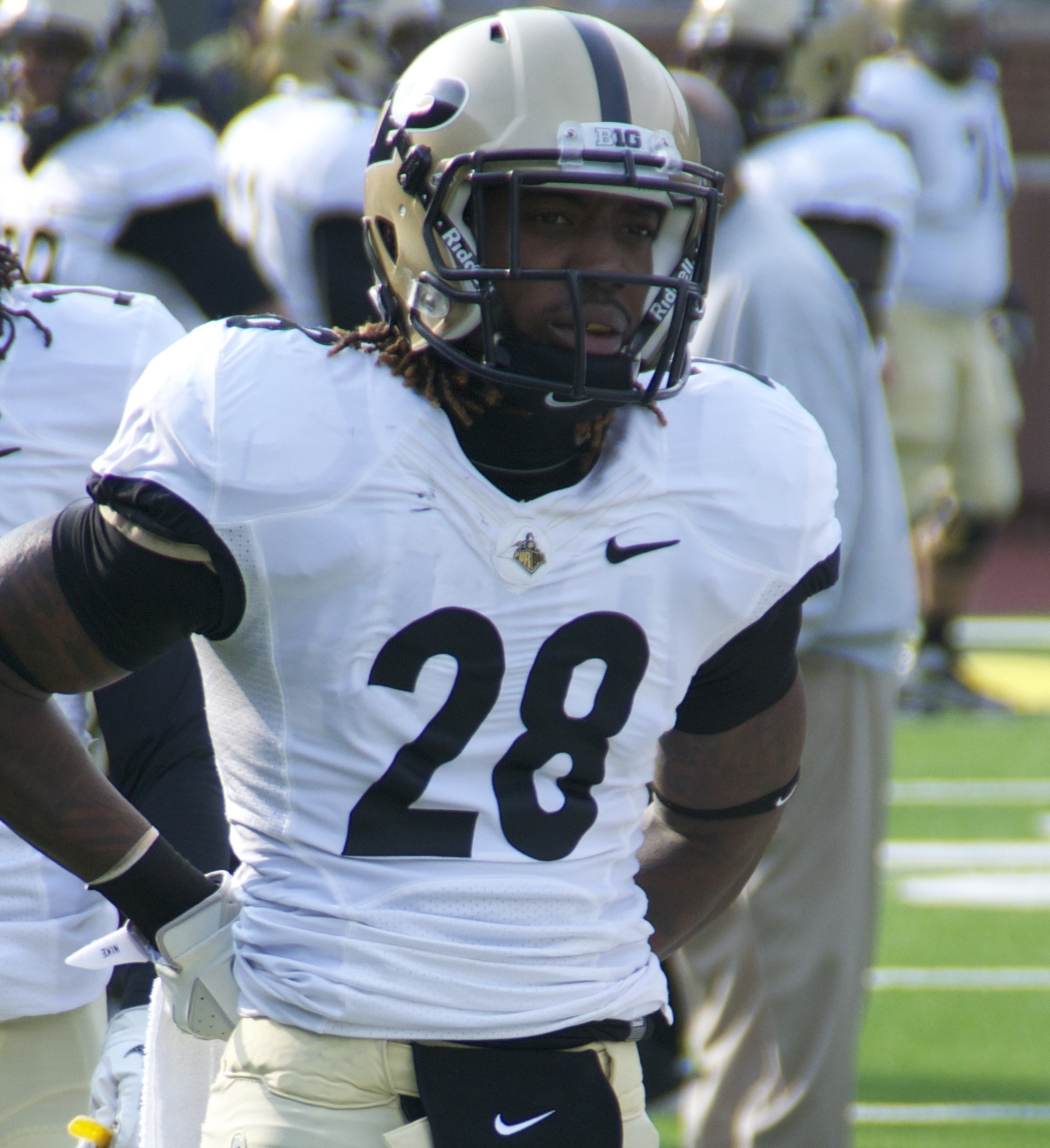
- Johnson with the Purdue Boilermakers in 2011

No. 29
- Position: Cornerback

Personal information
- Born: September 10, 1989 (age 37); Dade City, Florida, U.S.
- Listed height: 5 ft 9 in (1.75 m)
- Listed weight: 200 lb (91 kg)

Career information
- High school: Pasco (Dade City)
- College: Purdue
- NFL draft: 2013: undrafted

Career history
- 2013: San Diego Chargers*
- 2014–2015: BC Lions
- 2016–2017: Jacksonville Jaguars
- 2018: Ottawa Redblacks
- 2018: Hamilton Tiger-Cats
- 2019: Edmonton Eskimos
- 2020–2022: Winnipeg Blue Bombers
- * Offseason or practice squad member only

Awards and highlights
- Grey Cup champion (2021); Second-team All-Big Ten (2012)
- Stats at Pro Football Reference
- Stats at CFL.ca

Joshua Lutrail Johnson (born September 10, 1989) is an American former professional football player who was a cornerback in the National Football League (NFL) and Canadian Football League (CFL). He played college football for the Purdue Boilermakers.

== Early life ==
Johnson attended Pasco High School in Dade City, Florida. He was a first-team All-Sun Coast and All-Sunshine Athletic Conference after catching 32 passes for 466 yards (14.6 average) and nine touchdowns and rushing for 204 yards on 39 carries (5.2 average) as senior helping his team advance to the state semifinals. He also played baseball and was named one of the top 100 juniors in the nation after leading the Tampa Bay area in home runs.

Considered a two-star recruit by Rivals.com, he accepted a scholarship to Purdue University over an offer from Vanderbilt University.

== College career ==
During his tenure with the Boilermakers, Johnson started 36 of 49 games, where he accumulated 184 tackles (149 solo), including 7.5 for a loss, 31 pass break ups and six interceptions. He was twice named Academic All-Big Ten and was an all conference honorable mention as a senior.

== Professional career ==
Pre-draft measurables
Height	Weight	Arm length	Hand span	Wingspan	40-yard dash	10-yard split	20-yard split	20-yard shuttle	Three-cone drill	Vertical jump	Broad jump	Bench press
5 ft 9 3/8 in (1.76 m)	199 lb (90 kg)	30 3/8 in (0.77 m)	9 1/4 in (0.23 m)	6 ft 1 in (1.85 m)	4.54 s	1.58 s	2.69 s	4.25 s	6.99 s	36.0 in (0.91 m)	9 ft 11 in (3.02 m)	16 reps
All values from NFL Combine/Pro Day

=== San Diego Chargers ===
Johnson went undrafted during the 2013 NFL draft, but signed with the San Diego Chargers after the draft ended.

=== BC Lions ===
Johnson played for the BC Lions of the Canadian Football League from 2014 to 2015.

=== Jacksonville Jaguars ===
Johnson signed with the Jacksonville Jaguars on February 12, 2016. On August 14, 2017, Johnson was waived/injured by the Jaguars and placed on injured reserve. He was released on October 10, 2017.

=== Ottawa Redblacks ===
Josh Johnson signed with the Ottawa Redblacks of the Canadian Football League (CFL) on March 14, 2018. He was released on July 17, 2018.

=== Hamilton Tiger-Cats ===
On August 19, 2018, Johnson signed with the Hamilton Tiger-Cats.

=== Edmonton Eskimos ===
Johnson was signed by the Eskimos as a free agent on May 17, 2019.

=== Winnipeg Blue Bombers ===
Johnson signed a one-year contract extension with the Winnipeg Blue Bombers on January 15, 2021.
