= Pasco High School (Florida) =

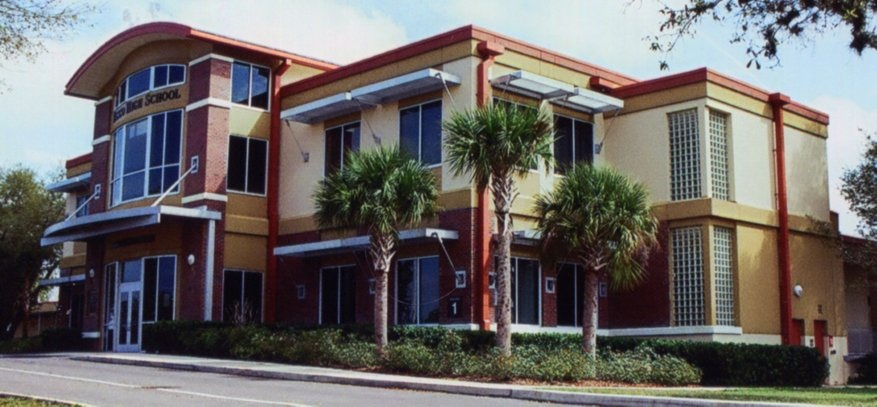

Location
- 36850 State Road 52; Dade City, Florida 33525; United States; 28.35236°N 82.20531°W

Information
- School type: Public
- Established: 1889; 137 years ago
- School district: Pasco County Schools
- Principal: Mark Feldman
- Teaching staff: 73.00
- Grades: 9–12
- Gender: All
- Enrollment: 1,639 (2022–23)
- Student to teacher ratio: 22.45
- Colors: Black and red
- Nickname: Pirates
- Yearbook: The Captain's Log
- Website: phs.pasco.k12.fl.us

Pasco High School is a high school in Dade City, Florida, United States. The school was the first high school in Pasco County.

== History ==
Pasco High School originated from the earliest school in Dade City, and is the first high school in Pasco County. This first school in Dade City held classes at the Baptist Church in the town. According to a speech delivered in 1921 by a local historian, the second location for the school was a second floor room above a storefront, just south of a cigar factory. After that, a local Masonic Temple was used for classes. Finally, circa 1899, the first purpose-built building for the school was erected on land donated by the S. A. L. Railroad. It was in this building that the high school held classes, having been founded about ten years earlier in 1889.

The first building was supplemented by a wooden annex in 1905, then by a large two-story annex in 1908. Also in 1908, the Gainesville Daily Sun reported that a normal school, the South Florida Normal Institute, had been established in the same location. The report stated, "The South Florida Normal Institute, Dade City, has reached an enrollment of 322. The school board has contracted with Prof. P. W. Corr, as principal, for the next five years, and it will meet next Friday to open bids and let contract for a large annex to the present building. No school in the State is doing better work or making more rapid growth than the South Florida Normal Institute. The cornerstone of the new building will be laid with Masonic honors."

In 1947, the St. Petersburg Times reported that the local school district was reorganized. Stated the report, "A recently reorganized school district consisting of the smaller districts of Pasadena, Pasco Station, and Blanton in a recent referendum voted a bond issue of $400,000 to finance the erection of a new Pasco High school and to enlarge the grammar school within Dade City." This new school, the third building housing Pasco High, opened in 1949, and held classes until 1970. The 1949 building was then used for Pasco Middle School and was demolished in 2010. The present high school opened in 1970.

== Notable alumni ==
- The Bellamy Brothers, David and Howard
- Domonic Brown, outfielder for the Philadelphia Phillies
- Jim Courier, tennis pro
- Darren Hambrick
- Troy Hambrick
- Josh Johnson, cornerback
- Gene Nelson, former MLB player (New York Yankees, Seattle Mariners, Chicago White Sox, Oakland Athletics, California Angels, Texas Rangers
- Joey Ivie, NFL player for the Tennessee Titans
- Janarion Grant, gridiron football return specialist for the Toronto Argonauts
- Kurt S. Browning, Former Pasco County Superintendent of Schools, Florida Secretary of State, and Pasco County Supervisor of Elections
- Wilton Simpson, Florida Agriculture Commissioner and Former State Senator
