= Joey Ivie =

American football player (born 1995)

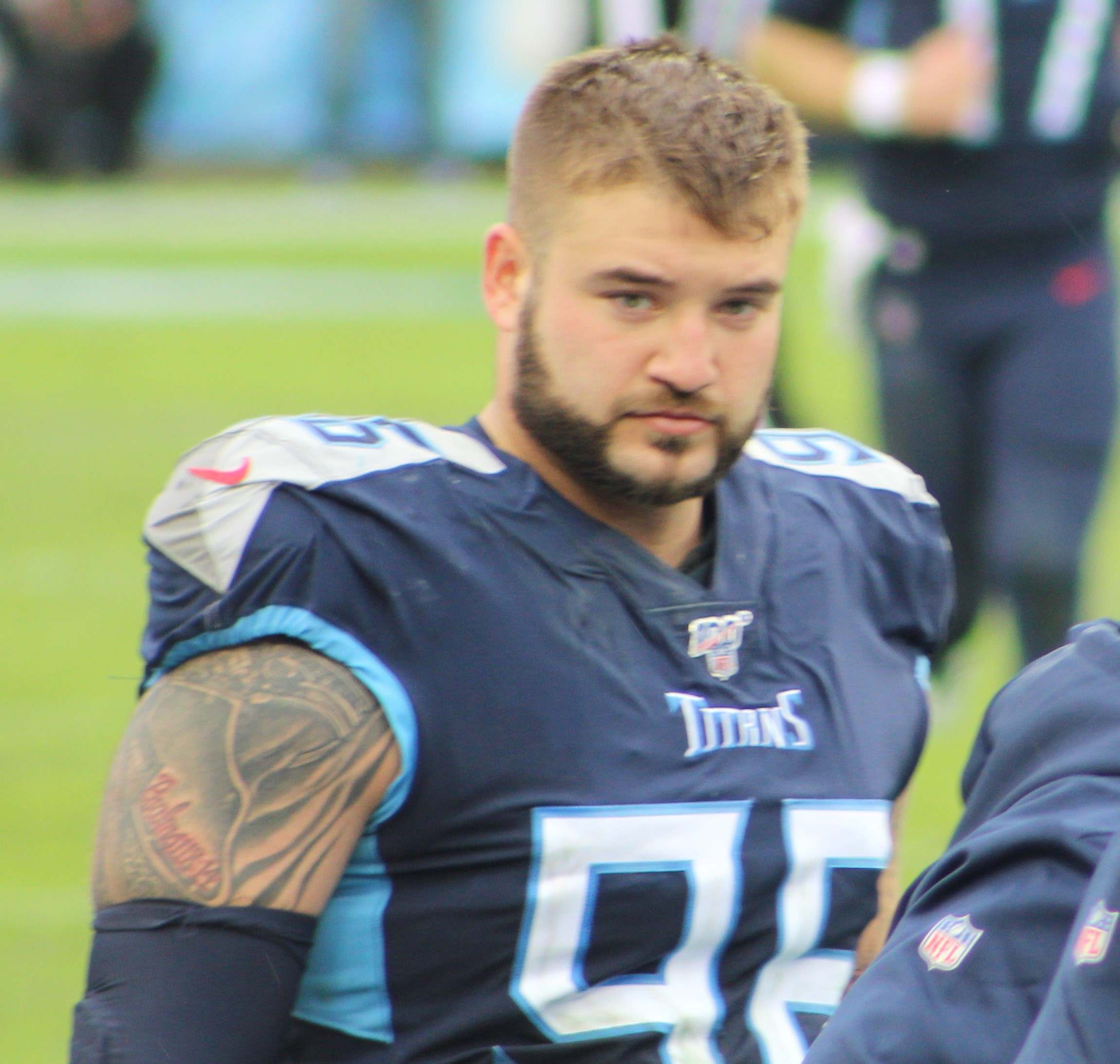
- Ivie with the Tennessee Titans in 2019

No. 93, 96
- Position: Defensive tackle

Personal information
- Born: January 22, 1995 (age 31); Dade City, Florida, U.S.
- Listed height: 6 ft 3 in (1.91 m)
- Listed weight: 295 lb (134 kg)

Career information
- High school: Pasco (Dade City)
- College: Florida
- NFL draft: 2017: 7th round, 228th overall pick

Career history
- Dallas Cowboys (2017)*; Atlanta Falcons (2017–2018)*; Seattle Seahawks (2018)*; Kansas City Chiefs (2018–2019); Tennessee Titans (2019); Cleveland Browns (2020); Indianapolis Colts (2021)*; Buffalo Bills (2021)*; Houston Gamblers (2022)
- * Offseason or practice squad member only

Career NFL statistics
- Games played: 8
- Total tackles: 2
- Stats at Pro Football Reference

Alfred Joseph Ivie IV (born January 22, 1995) is an American former professional football player who was a defensive tackle in the National Football League (NFL). He played college football for the Florida Gators.

== Early life ==
Ivie attended Pasco High School, where he played football for the Pirates for four years, becoming a starter at defensive tackle as a junior, registering 53 tackles (18 for loss). As a senior, Ivie moved to left defensive end and made 89 tackles (8 for loss). Sometimes he lined up at fullback and tight end as well. He also played basketball at center as a freshman.

== College career ==
Ivie accepted a football scholarship from the University of Florida. He is the third generation in his family to attend the school in Gainesville. As a true freshman, he removed his redshirt status late in the season due to the team's depth issues, playing as a backup in three of the last five games.

As a sophomore, Ivie made 24 tackles (3 for loss) and one sack as a backup. As a junior, he started five games, posting 27 tackles (four for loss) and 3.5 sacks. As a junior, he appeared in four games and had 16 total tackles and one forced fumble. As a senior, he started 10 out of 11 games (a broken thumb kept him out of two games), registering 26 tackles (3.5 for loss), 2.5 sacks and seven quarterback hurries.

Ivie spent most of his college career as a nose tackle on a defensive line rotation that included talented players like Jonathan Bullard and Caleb Brantley.

== Professional career ==
Pre-draft measurables
Height	Weight	Arm length	Hand span	Wingspan	40-yard dash	10-yard split	20-yard split	20-yard shuttle	Three-cone drill	Vertical jump	Broad jump	Bench press
6 ft 3 1/8 in (1.91 m)	298 lb (135 kg)	32 1/2 in (0.83 m)	9 5/8 in (0.24 m)	6 ft 4 5/8 in (1.95 m)	5.14 s	1.75 s	3.01 s	4.72 s	8.09 s	29.5 in (0.75 m)	8 ft 9 in (2.67 m)	23 reps
All values from Pro Day

=== Dallas Cowboys ===
Ivie was selected by the Dallas Cowboys in the seventh round (228th overall) of the 2017 NFL draft. He posted numbers in his college Pro Day that would have placed him among the top tier of the defensive tackles at the NFL Combine. On May 11, he signed a four-year, $2.48 million contract with a signing bonus of $86,489. He was waived by the Cowboys on September 2, 2017.

=== Atlanta Falcons ===
On October 17, 2017, Ivie was signed to the practice squad of the Atlanta Falcons. He signed a reserve/future contract with the Falcons on January 15, 2018. He was waived on June 1, 2018.

=== Seattle Seahawks ===
On August 6, 2018, Ivie signed with the Seattle Seahawks. He was waived on September 1, 2018.

=== Kansas City Chiefs ===
On September 4, 2018, Ivie was signed to the Kansas City Chiefs' practice squad. He signed a reserve/future contract with the Chiefs on January 23, 2019.

In 2019, Ivie made the team after passing defensive tackle Justin Hamilton on the depth chart during preseason. He was waived on September 16, 2019, and re-signed to the practice squad. On November 2, 2019, he was elevated off the practice squad. He was waived on November 22.

=== Tennessee Titans ===
Ivie was signed to the Tennessee Titans practice squad on November 26, 2019. He was promoted to the active roster on December 14, 2019.

On September 5, 2020, Ivie was waived by the Titans.

=== Cleveland Browns ===
On September 11, 2020, Ivie was signed to the Cleveland Browns' practice squad. Ivie was elevated to the Browns' active roster on October 10 and November 28 for the team's weeks 5 and 12 games against the Indianapolis Colts and Jacksonville Jaguars, and reverted to the practice squad after each game. He was released on January 9, 2021.

=== Indianapolis Colts ===
On July 31, 2021, Ivie signed with the Colts. He was waived on August 23, 2021.

=== Buffalo Bills ===
On August 24, 2021, Ivie was claimed off waivers by the Buffalo Bills. He was waived on August 27.

=== Houston Gamblers ===
Ivie signed with the Houston Gamblers of the United States Football League on April 28, 2022.

== Metaleague ==
On April 13, 2022, Ivie was part of the team (along with fellow NFL players Alex Bachman, Rodney Adams, and Jordan Scarlett) that launched the Metaleague Non-fungible_token project on the Fractal Platform which was founded by Justin Kan, the founder of Twitch.
