= Mudcat Grant =

American baseball player (1935–2021)

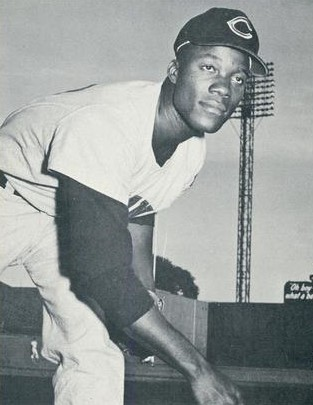
- Grant with the Cleveland Indians in 1960
- Pitcher
- Born: August 13, 1935; Lacoochee, Florida, U.S.
- Died: June 11, 2021 (aged 85); Los Angeles, California, U.S.
- Batted: Right Threw: Right

MLB debut
- April 17, 1958, for the Cleveland Indians

Last MLB appearance
- September 29, 1971, for the Oakland Athletics

MLB statistics
- Win–loss record: 145–119
- Earned run average: 3.63
- Strikeouts: 1,267
- Stats at Baseball Reference

Teams
- Cleveland Indians (1958–1964); Minnesota Twins (1964–1967); Los Angeles Dodgers (1968); Montreal Expos (1969); St. Louis Cardinals (1969); Oakland Athletics (1970); Pittsburgh Pirates (1970–1971); Oakland Athletics (1971)

Career highlights and awards
- 2× All-Star (1963, 1965); AL wins leader (1965)

James Timothy "Mudcat" Grant Jr. (August 13, 1935 – June 11, 2021) was an American professional baseball pitcher who played 14 seasons in Major League Baseball (MLB). He played for the Cleveland Indians, Minnesota Twins, Los Angeles Dodgers, Montreal Expos, St. Louis Cardinals, Oakland Athletics, and Pittsburgh Pirates from 1958 to 1971. He was a two-time All-Star.

In 1965, Grant became the first black pitcher to win 20 games in a season in the American League and the first black pitcher to win a World Series game for the American League. He pitched two complete-game World Series victories in 1965, hit a three-run home run in game 6, and was named The Sporting News American League Pitcher of the Year.

== Early life ==
Grant was born in Lacoochee, Florida, on August 13, 1935. He was one of seven children of James Sr. and Viola Grant. His father died when Grant was two years old. He attended Moore Academy in nearby Dade City, where he played football, basketball, and baseball. Grant was awarded a scholarship to play football and baseball at Florida A&M University. However, he dropped out during his sophomore year in order to support his family through financial difficulty.

== Professional career ==
Grant signed as an amateur free agent with the Cleveland Indians before the 1954 season. He played four seasons in the minor leagues from 1954 to 1957. Grant played winter baseball in Colombia in 1956 and in Cuba with Almendares in 1957. He made his MLB debut on April 17, 1958, at the age of 22, winning a complete game against the Kansas City Athletics. His best season in Cleveland was in 1961 when he had a win-loss record of 15–9 and a 3.86 earned run average. In June 1964, he was traded to the Minnesota Twins and had a record of 11–9 for the remainder of the season. In 1965 Grant had the best year of his career. He was 21–7 for the Twins, helping to lead the team to the 1965 World Series against the Los Angeles Dodgers. In 1965, Grant hosted a local Minneapolis variety television program, The Jim Grant Show, where he sang and danced.

Grant finished 6th in voting for the 1965 American League MVP for leading the league in wins, win-loss percentage (.750), and shutouts (6). He also started 39 games and had 14 complete games, 270 1/3 innings pitched, 252 hits allowed, 34 home runs allowed, 107 runs allowed, 99 earned runs allowed, 61 walks, 142 strikeouts, 8 wild pitches, 1,095 batters faced, 2 intentional walks issued, and a 3.30 ERA. Grant's home run in the 6th game of the 1965 World Series was only the second by an American League pitcher during a World Series game.

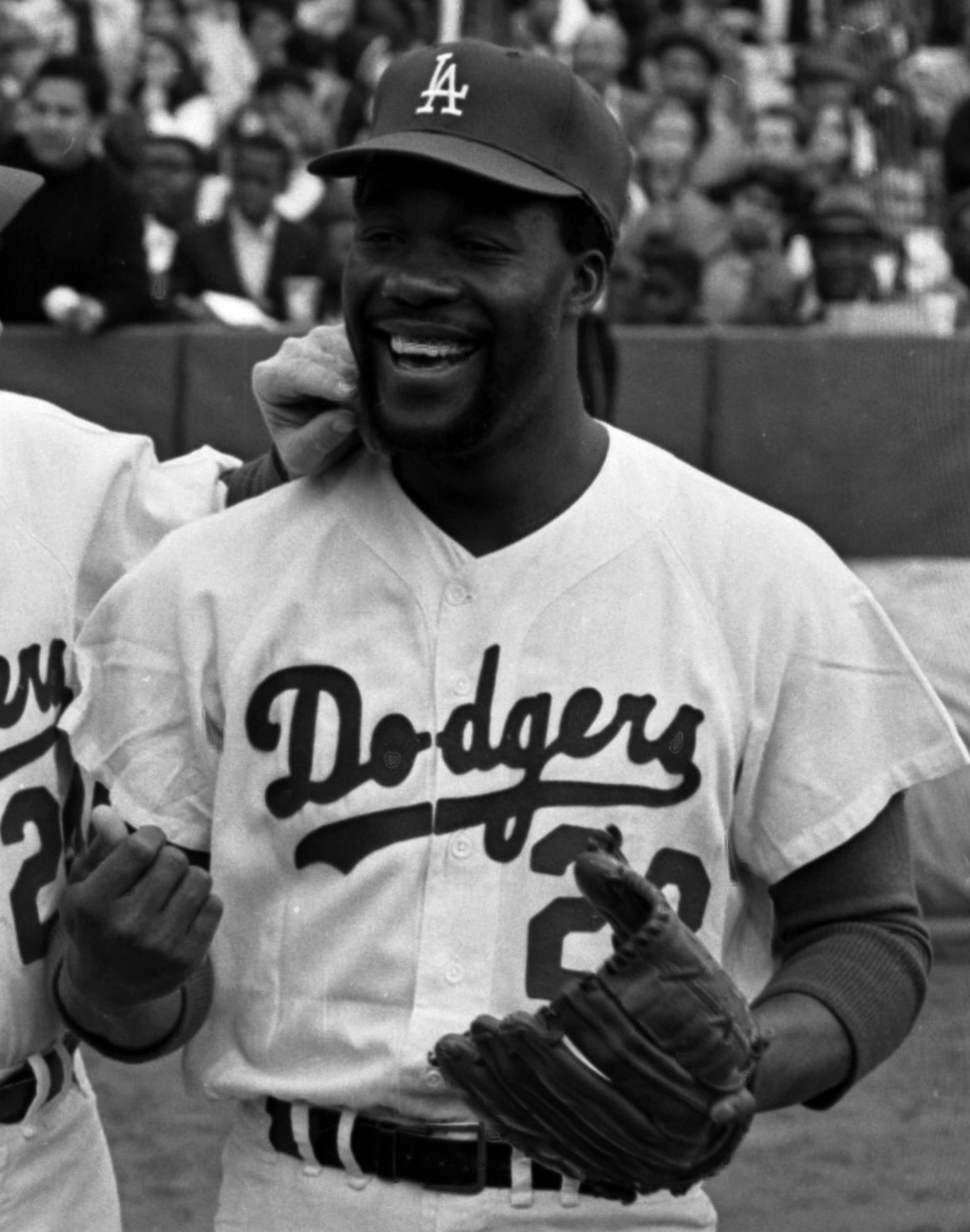
Grant with the Dodgers in 1968

Grant's last year as a full-time starting pitcher came in 1966. He spent his next five seasons in baseball as a reliever and occasional starter for five different big-league clubs. He and Zoilo Versalles were traded by the Twins to the Dodgers for John Roseboro, Ron Perranoski, and Bob Miller on November 28, 1967.

Grant was the starting pitcher for the Montreal Expos in their first-ever game on April 8, 1969. He pitched 1.1 innings while allowing six hits and three runs, starting his season off with a 20.25 ERA, although the Expos would later win the game in an 11–10 shootout that had nine combined pitchers in the game. He played his final major league game on September 29, 1971, at the age of 36.

In a 14 season MLB career, he had a 145–119 record in 571 games, while starting in 293 of them and throwing 89 complete games and finishing 160 of them, 18 shutouts, 53 saves, with 2,442 innings pitched, and posted a 3.63 ERA. Grant's home run during Game 6 of the 1965 World Series was the only one he hit that season and one of only seven he hit during his entire career. As a hitter, Grant had a .178 batting average (135-for-759) with 80 runs, 6 home runs, 65 RBI and 37 bases on balls. Defensively, he recorded a .966 fielding percentage.

== Post-playing career ==
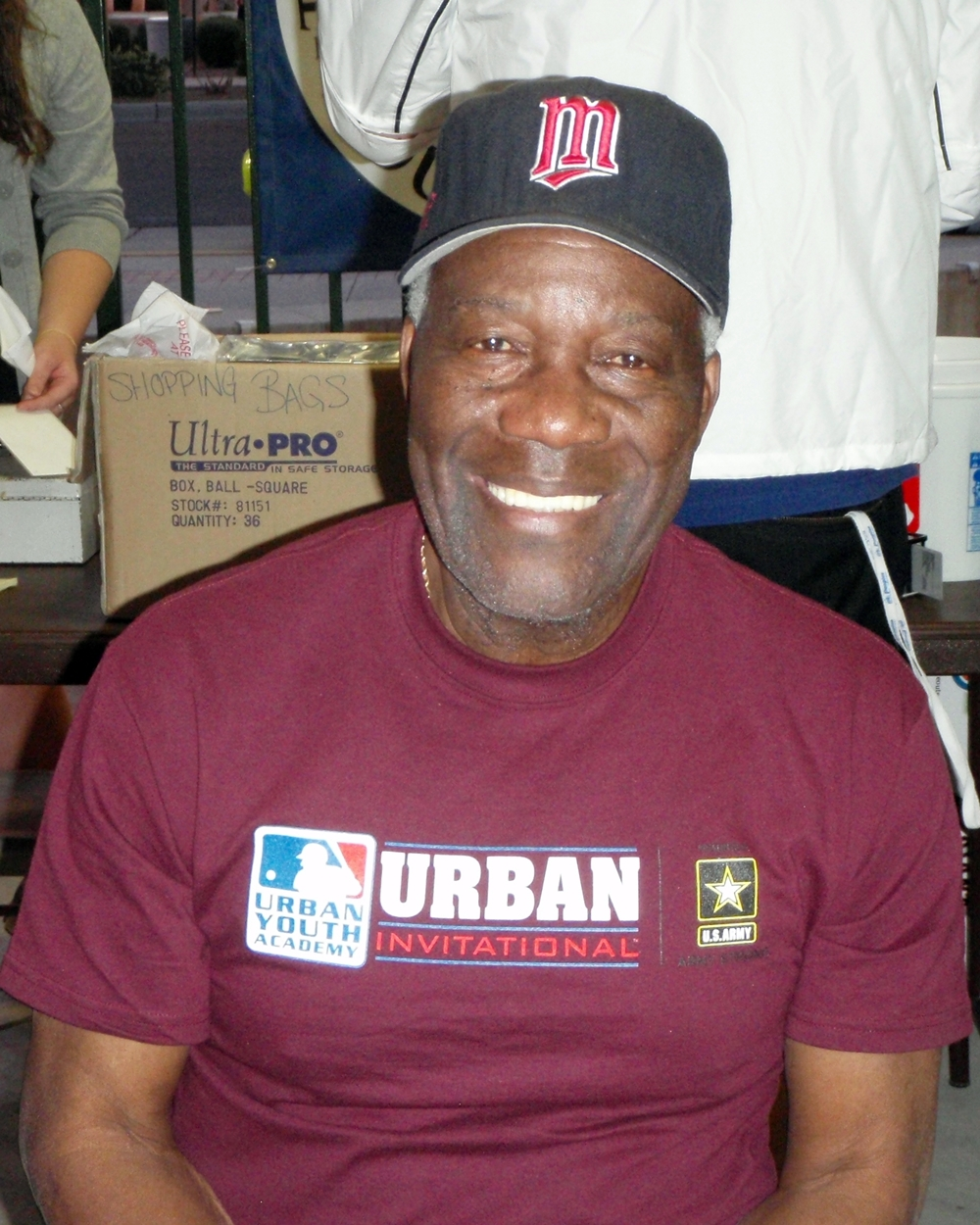
Grant in 2011

After retiring as a player, Grant served as the Publicity Director for the North American Softball League (NASL), one of three men's professional softball leagues active in the pro softball era. He later worked as a broadcaster and executive for the Indians, and also as a broadcaster for the Athletics.

During his later years, Grant dedicated himself to studying and promoting the history of Black people in baseball. On his official website, Grant paid tribute to the black major-league pitchers (including himself) who won 20 or more games in a season.

In 2007, Grant released The Black Aces, Baseball's Only African-American Twenty-Game Winners, featuring chapters on each of the then-13 black pitchers to have at least one twenty-win season, and also featuring Negro league players that Grant felt would have been twenty-game winners if they had not been excluded by the baseball color line. The book was featured at the Baseball Hall of Fame during Induction Weekend 2006. In February 2007, during an event to honor Black History Month, President George W. Bush honored Grant and fellow Aces Ferguson Jenkins, Dontrelle Willis, and Mike Norris, and the publication of the book, at the White House.

Grant threw out the ceremonial first pitch on Opening Day at Progressive Field in Cleveland on April 14, 2008, to commemorate the 50th anniversary of his major-league debut; he was also awarded the key to the city to honor the occasion. He was inducted into the Baseball Reliquary's Shrine of the Eternals in 2012. Four years later, he was awarded an honorary Doctor of Humane Letters (L.H.D.) from Whittier College in 2016.

Grant died on June 11, 2021, at the age of 85. He was buried at Inglewood Park Cemetery.

== See also ==
- List of Major League Baseball annual wins leaders
- List of World Series starting pitchers
