= Trilby, Florida =

Trilby
- CDP
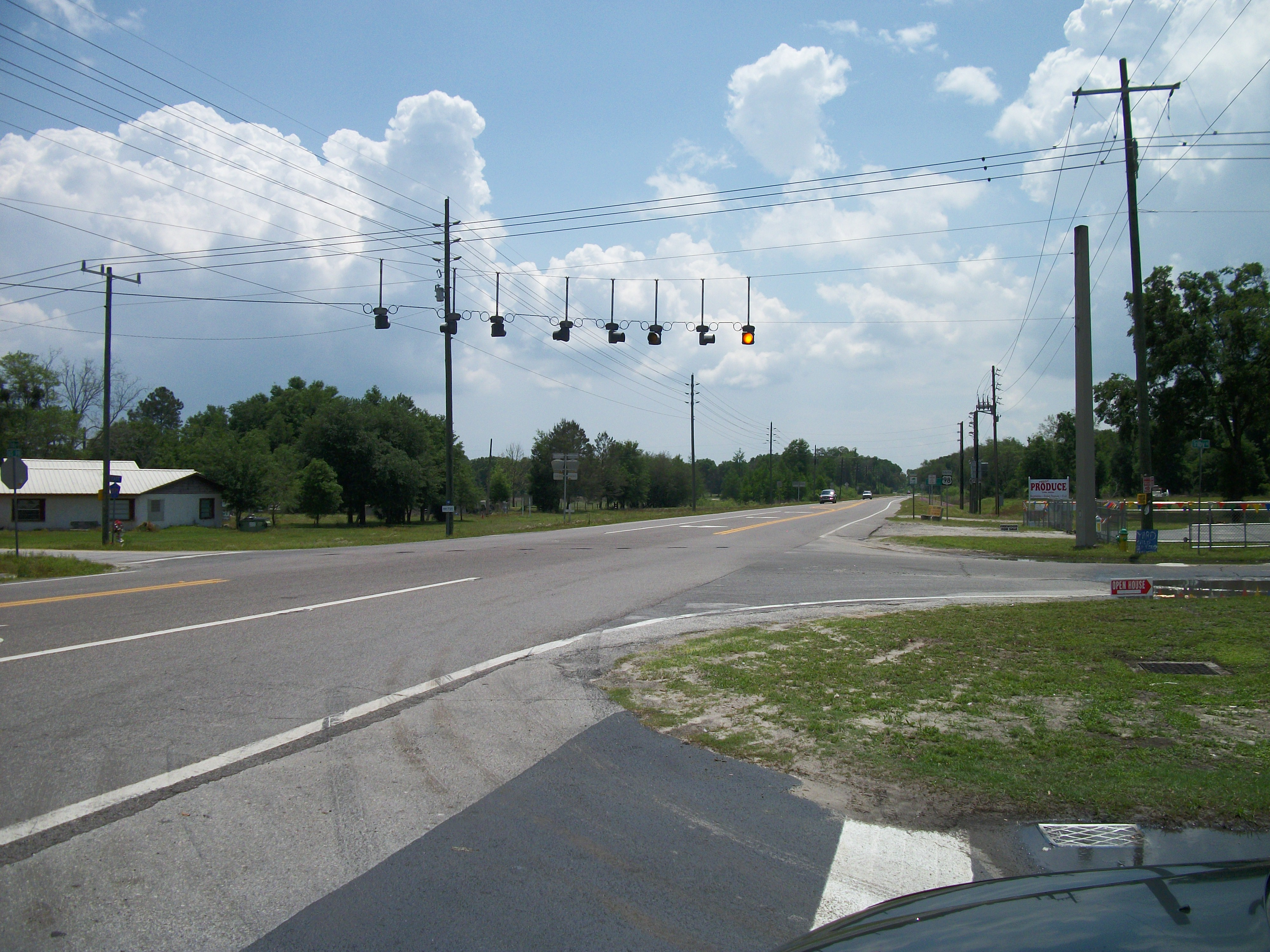
- Southbound US 98 at the intersection of County Road 575 in Trilby, Florida
- Interactive map of Trilby
- Coordinates: 28°27′23″N 82°11′38″W
- Country: United States
- State: Florida
- County: Pasco

Area
  - Total: 1.00 sq mi (2.60 km^{2})
  - Land: 1.00 sq mi (2.60 km^{2})
  - Water: 0 sq mi (0.00 km^{2})
- Elevation: 72 ft (22 m)

Population (2020)
  - Total: 433
  - Density: 431.6/sq mi (166.66/km^{2})
- Time zone: UTC-5 (Eastern (EST))
  - Summer (DST): UTC-4 (EDT)
- ZIP codes: 33593
- Area code: 352
- FIPS code: 12-72425
- GNIS feature ID: 2583383

Trilby is a census-designated place (CDP) in the northeast corner of Pasco County, Florida, United States. The population was 433 at the 2020 census.

Trilby has a non-profit "Greater Trilby Community Association" which exists to improve the life and quality of residents of the Trilby, Trilacoochee and Lacoochee area.

Trilby is the southernmost community along the Withlacoochee State Trail.

== History ==
An earlier name for the town was Macon. The newer name Trilby was in use by 1895, although the Macon post office was not renamed Trilby until 1901. Railroad magnate Henry Plant changed the name of the town because it duplicated the name of Macon, Georgia. He has been quoted as saying he wished to name it "after the heroine of a story which has lately deeply moved me", referring to George du Maurier's novel of the same name. Trilby was incorporated by the state legislature as a town on May 23, 1901, but was disincorporated on May 11, 1909. The town was again incorporated by the state legislature in 1913 but was disincorporated for a second time on April 24, 1935. Because of the loss of its railroad industry, it has declined into a residential community for Dade City, and also for the Tampa Bay region.

== Geography ==
According to the United States Census Bureau, the CDP has an area of 1.0 square mile (2.6 km^{2}), all land.

U.S. Highway 98 runs along the east side of Trilby, immediately to the north of a split with U.S. Highway 301 (US 301). In addition, Pasco County Road 575 passes through the center of town on a roughly east–west itinerary, and continues east toward adjacent Trilacoochee, followed by Lacoochee.

The southern terminus of the Withlacoochee State Trail, the longest rail trail in Florida, is located near Trilby.

== Demographics ==
Historical population
Census	Pop.	Note	%±
2010	419		—
2020	433		3.3%
U.S. Decennial Census

Trilby first appeared as a census designated place in the 2010 U.S. census.

=== 2010 census ===
As of the census of 2010, there were 419 people, 165 households, and 113 families residing in the CDP. There were 263 housing units. The racial makeup of the CDP was 62.53% White, 30.31% African American, 0.24% Native American, 0% Asian, 0% Pacific Islander, 5.49% from other races, and 1.43% from two or more races. Hispanic or Latino of any race were 11.46% of the population.

There were 165 households, out of which 31.52% had children under the age of 18 living with them, 41.21% contained married couples living together, 12.73% had a female householder with no husband present, and 31.52% were non-families. 24.85% of all households were made up of individuals, and 10.3% had someone living alone who was 65 years of age or older. The average household size was 2.54 and the average family size was 2.99.

In the CDP, the population was spread out, with 20.76% under the age of 18, 11.46% from 18 to 24, 20.05% from 25 to 44, 30.07% from 45 to 64, and 17.66% who were 65 years of age or older. The median age was 43.3 years.
