= Lacoochee, Florida =

- CDP
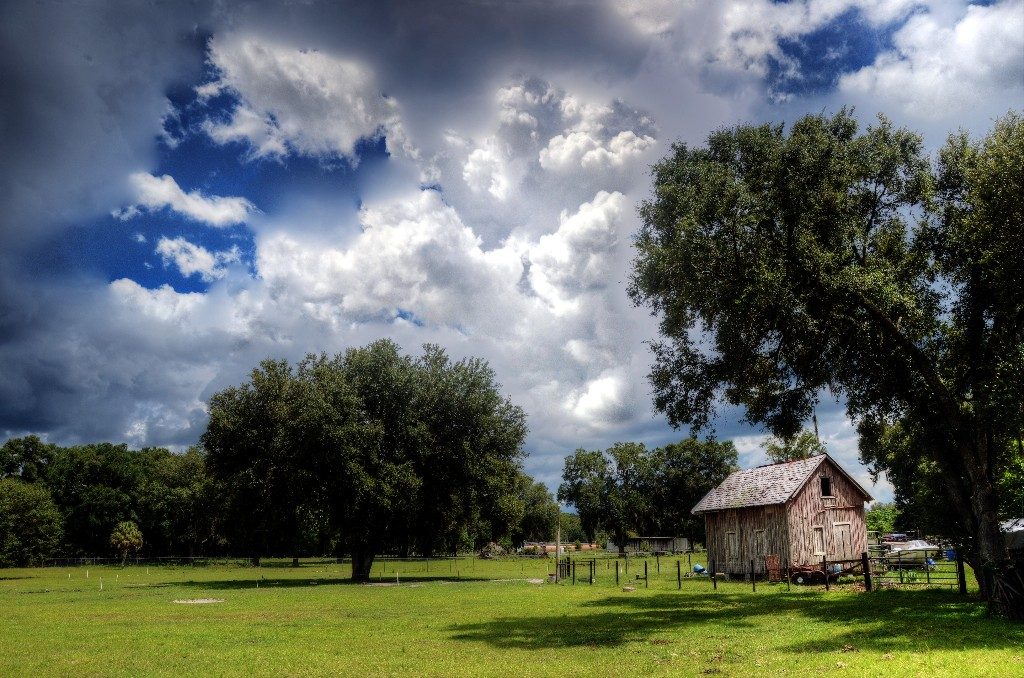
- Field in Lacoochee

- Location in Pasco County and the state of Florida
- Coordinates: 28°27′56″N 82°10′11″W
- Country: United States
- State: Florida
- County: Pasco

Area
  - Total: 2.86 sq mi (7.42 km^{2})
  - Land: 2.85 sq mi (7.39 km^{2})
  - Water: 0.012 sq mi (0.03 km^{2})
- Elevation: 69 ft (21 m)

Population (2020)
  - Total: 1,124
  - Density: 393.8/sq mi (152.05/km^{2})
- Time zone: UTC-5 (Eastern (EST))
  - Summer (DST): UTC-4 (EDT)
- ZIP code: 33537
- Area code: 352
- FIPS code: 12-37275
- GNIS feature ID: 2403182

Lacoochee is a census-designated place (CDP) in Pasco County, Florida, United States. As of the 2020 census, Lacoochee had a population of 1,124.

== Geography ==
According to the United States Census Bureau, the CDP has a total area of 2.8 square miles (7.3 km^{2}), all land.

== Demographics ==
Historical population
Census	Pop.	Note	%±
2020	1,124		—
U.S. Decennial Census

=== 2020 census ===
As of the 2020 census, Lacoochee had a population of 1,124. The median age was 37.9 years. 26.3% of residents were under the age of 18 and 17.3% of residents were 65 years of age or older. For every 100 females there were 96.2 males, and for every 100 females age 18 and over there were 93.9 males age 18 and over.

0.0% of residents lived in urban areas, while 100.0% lived in rural areas.

There were 405 households in Lacoochee, of which 37.5% had children under the age of 18 living in them. Of all households, 41.5% were married-couple households, 15.8% were households with a male householder and no spouse or partner present, and 36.5% were households with a female householder and no spouse or partner present. About 21.0% of all households were made up of individuals and 9.6% had someone living alone who was 65 years of age or older.

There were 501 housing units, of which 19.2% were vacant. The homeowner vacancy rate was 5.5% and the rental vacancy rate was 13.0%.

Racial composition as of the 2020 census
Race	Number	Percent
White	631	56.1%
Black or African American	236	21.0%
American Indian and Alaska Native	2	0.2%
Asian	1	0.1%
Native Hawaiian and Other Pacific Islander	2	0.2%
Some other race	142	12.6%
Two or more races	110	9.8%
Hispanic or Latino (of any race)	296	26.3%

=== 2000 census ===
As of the census of 2000, there were 1,345 people, 417 households, and 321 families residing in the CDP. The population density was 471.6 inhabitants per square mile (182.1/km^{2}). There were 457 housing units at an average density of 160.2 per square mile (61.9/km^{2}). The racial makeup of the CDP was 60.59% White, 24.24% African American, 2.23% Native American, 0.07% Asian, 0.07% Pacific Islander, 9.74% from other races, and 3.05% from two or more races. Hispanic or Latino of any race were 37.55% of the population.

There were 417 households, out of which 47.7% had children under the age of 18 living with them, 47.0% were married couples living together, 20.6% had a female householder with no husband present, and 22.8% were non-families. 19.4% of all households were made up of individuals, and 6.2% had someone living alone who was 65 years of age or older. The average household size was 3.23 and the average family size was 3.66.

In the CDP, the population was spread out, with 40.1% under the age of 18, 9.8% from 18 to 24, 26.1% from 25 to 44, 15.8% from 45 to 64, and 8.3% who were 65 years of age or older. The median age was 25 years. For every 100 females, there were 103.2 males. For every 100 females age 18 and over, there were 92.8 males.

The median income for a household in the CDP was $15,197, and the median income for a family was $16,553. Males had a median income of $40,300 versus $11,250 for females. The per capita income for the CDP was $6,780. About 45.5% of families and 51.2% of the population were below the poverty line, including 57.4% of those under age 18 and 26.6% of those age 65 or over.

== Notable person ==
- Mudcat Grant, professional baseball player
