= Dade City, Florida =

- City
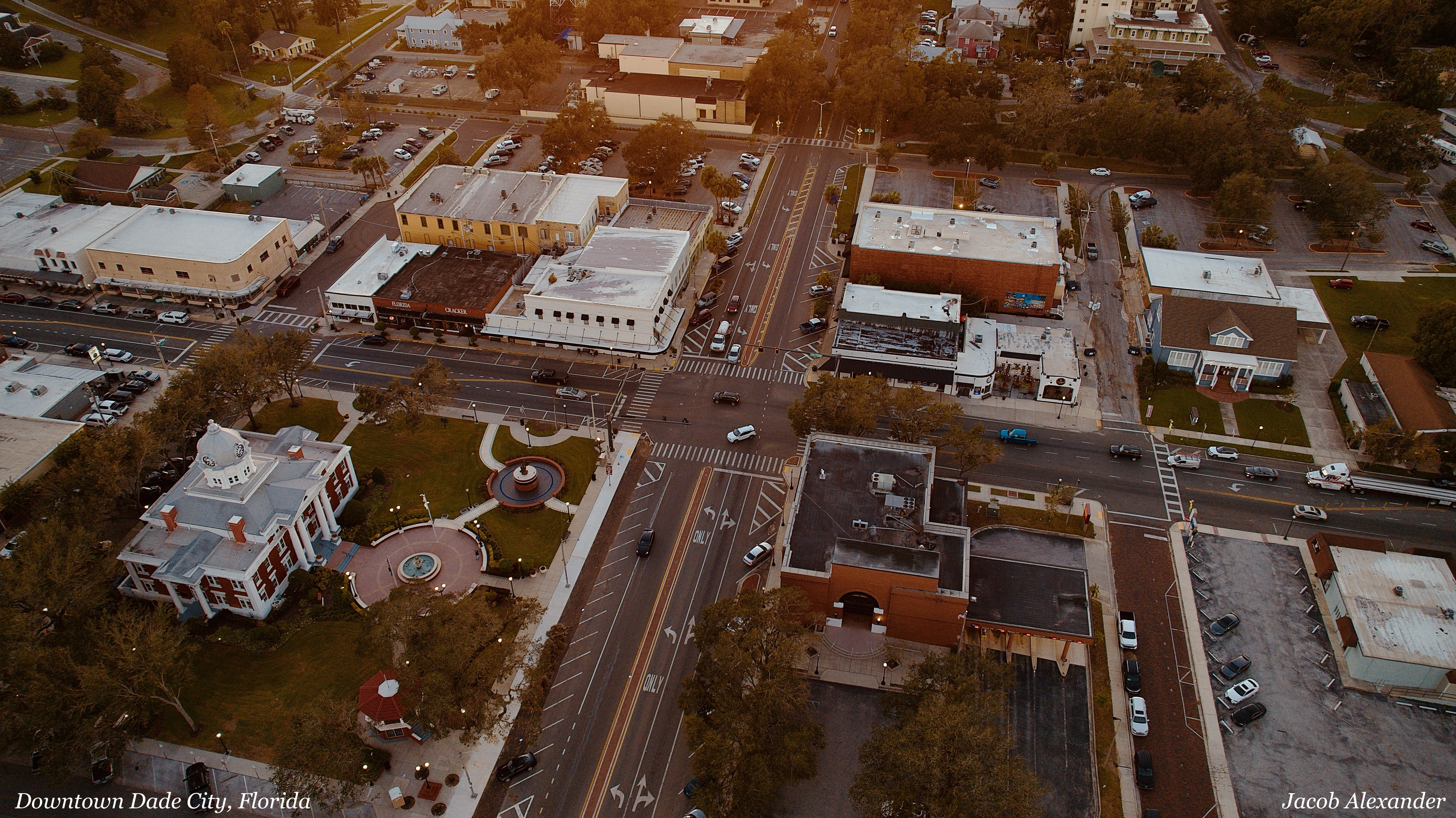
- Downtown Dade City (2024)

- Seal
- Motto(s): "Proud Heritage, Promising Future" "In The Hills of Pasco County"
- Location of Dade City, Florida
- Coordinates: 28°21′53″N 82°11′45″W
- Country: United States
- State: Florida
- County: Pasco
- Settled: 1870s–1880s
- Incorporated: 1884 or 1885
- Reincorporated: June 5, 1889
- Named for: Francis L. Dade

Government
  - Type: Commission-City Manager
  - Mayor: Scott Black
  - Mayor Pro Tem: Normita "Angel" Woodard
  - City manager: Marieke vanErven
  - City clerk: Angie Guy
  - City Commissioners: Kristin H. Church, Ann E. Cosentino, and James D. Shive

Area
  - City: 7.813 sq mi (20.236 km^{2})
  - Land: 7.586 sq mi (19.648 km^{2})
  - Water: 0.227 sq mi (0.589 km^{2})
- Elevation: 118 ft (36 m)

Population (2020)
  - City: 7,275
  - Estimate (2023): 8,646
  - Density: 1,246.8/sq mi (481.39/km^{2})
  - Urban: 20,304
- Demonym: Dade Citian
- Time zone: UTC−5 (Eastern (EST))
  - Summer (DST): UTC−4 (EDT)
- ZIP Codes: 33523, 33525, 33526
- Area code: 352
- FIPS code: 12-16125
- GNIS feature ID: 2404174
- Website: dadecityfl.com

Dade City is a city in, and the county seat of Pasco County, Florida, United States. It is located in the Tampa Bay Area, northeast of Tampa and southwest of Orlando. The population was 7,275 as of the 2020 census. The current mayor of Dade City is Scott Black.

The city was named after U.S. Army Major Francis L. Dade, who was killed—alongside most of the men he led from Fort Brooke (present-day Tampa) to Fort King (present-day Ocala)—in the Dade Battle, a pivotal event that sparked the Second Seminole War.

== History ==
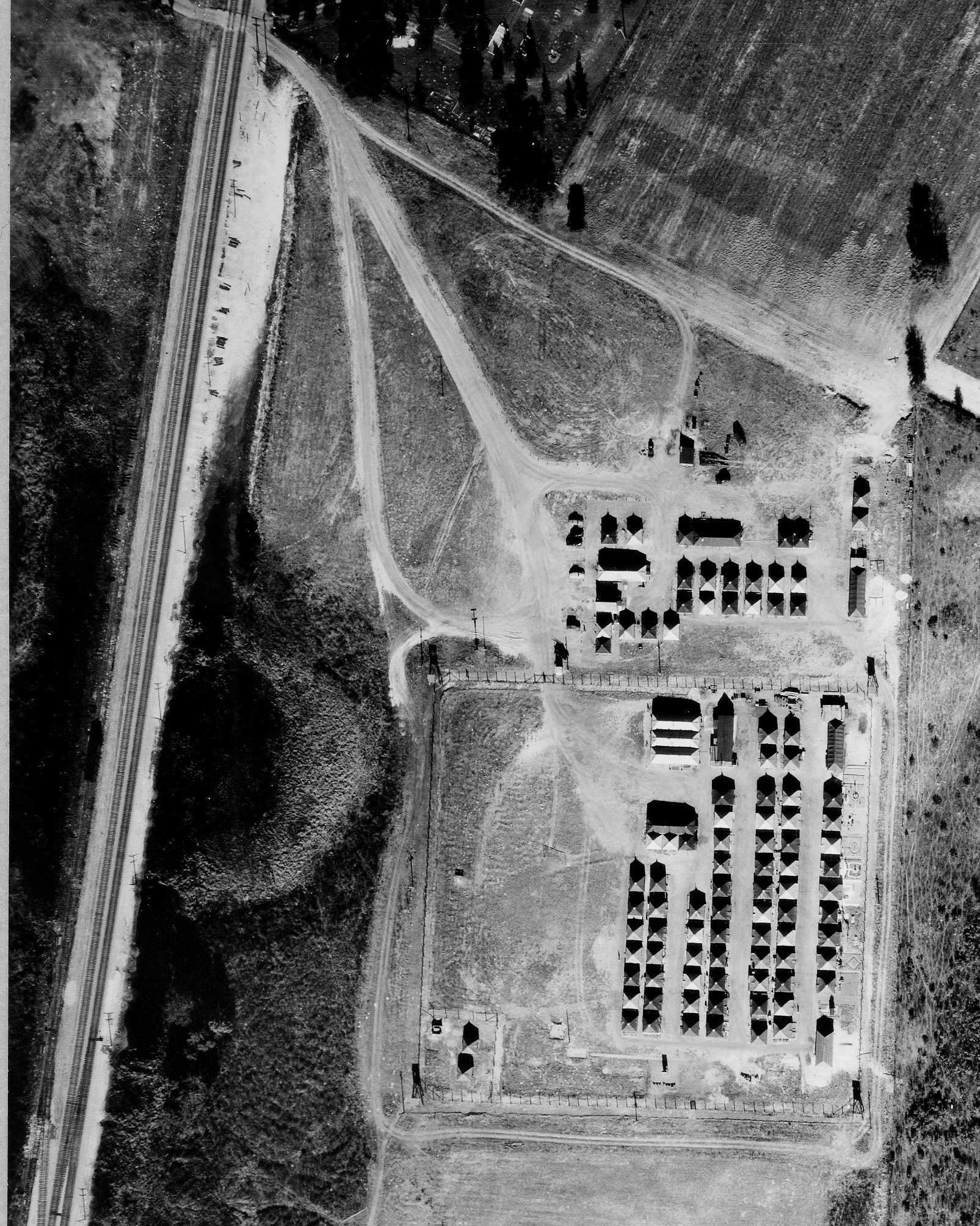
German prisoners of war camp December 1944

An earlier community known as Fort Dade existed nearby in the 1870s and 1880s. When the railroad was constructed a few miles east of Fort Dade, local business owners chose to relocate to be closer to it. The newer settlement became known as Dade City. The name became official when the Hatton post office was changed to the Dade City post office on December 18, 1884.

Initially incorporated as a town in either 1884 or 1885, Dade City was later reincorporated as a city following state legislative approval on June 5, 1889. When Pasco County was formed from the southern section of a much larger Hernando County (Citrus County was formed from the northern section) in 1887, Dade City became the county seat, first temporarily and later permanently, by popular vote.

The Pioneer Florida Museum (located just outside city limits), which opened on Labor Day of 1975, showcases the life of European-American pioneers in Central Florida. Some of its exhibits include a 1913 locomotive, a Methodist church, a house built prior to American Civil War, an old school, and an old train depot from Trilby, Florida.

The Crescent Theatre was Dade City's main movie theater from its opening in 1926 until it closed in 1950. It was located on the northeast corner of south 5th Street and Florida Avenue. The facade of the original building was preserved while other renovations were made for adaptive reuse. A metal structure was added in the 1990s. Today the building is used as a non-profit Seniors' Services center.

The Pasco Theatre, built as a movie theater on south 7th Street, opened in 1948 and operated until its demolition in 1999. The original "PASCO" sign, once fastened to the building's marquee, has since found a new home inside Florida Cracker Lunch on Limoges.

Lawrence Puckett (1906–1985) settled in Dade City in 1925. He later became involved in politics and served as mayor from 1981–1983 and as a member of the city commission from 1976 until his death in 1985. His recollections of the city were published by the Pasco County Centennial Committee. They date from his arrival as a young man of 19 years old. Puckett describes Dade City before and after the Florida land boom as "a typical southern agriculture area, where the few well-to-do controlled the economy and the poor white folks and Negroes did the work for minimal pay. In other words, folks here were either quite well-to-do or very damn poor". Puckett described Dade City as it existed during the Florida boom, with its various shops, streets, and buildings. Most of these had changed significantly by the time he was writing.

With the Florida land boom, people were streaming into the state, usually sticking to the East Coast. The overall economic effect was to drive up property prices all across the state. For Dade City, Puckett estimated that the top money-making ventures were either real estate, business related to real estate, or the production of moonshine.

He said that the increase of people and capital into Dade City had a profound effect on its culture:

Country clubs and golf courses were being constructed with country folks playing golf and dancing the Charleston. Woodlands and grazing lands were developed into subdivisions, with sidewalks and streets built nine miles into the woods, which in most cases was about all that happened.

During World War II, the government established a prisoner-of-war camp in Dade City. The prisoners were German soldiers from Field Marshal Erwin Rommel's Afrika Korps, who were captured in battles in North Africa in 1942-1943. They were put to work, producing limestone bricks, building warehouses, and making boxes. The POW camp operated from approximately 1942 to the spring of 1946. The site has been redeveloped as the Pyracantha Park Civic Center.

== Geography ==
According to the United States Census Bureau, the city has a total area of 7.813 square miles (20.24 km^{2}), of which, 7.586 square miles (19.65 km^{2}) is land and 0.227 square miles (0.59 km^{2}) (6.23%) is water.

== Demographics ==
Historical population
Census	Pop.	Note	%±
1890	321		—
1900	509		58.6%
1910	1,066		109.4%
1920	1,296		21.6%
1930	1,811		39.7%
1940	2,561		41.4%
1950	3,006		17.4%
1960	4,759		58.3%
1970	4,241		−10.9%
1980	4,923		16.1%
1990	5,633		14.4%
2000	6,188		9.9%
2010	6,437		4.0%
2020	7,275		13.0%
2023 (est.)	8,646	▲	18.8%
U.S. Decennial Census; 2020 Census

As of the 2022 American Community Survey, there are 2,505 estimated households in Dade City with an average of 2.74 persons per household. The city has a median household income of $63,493. Approximately 12.8% of the city's population lives at or below the poverty line. Dade City has an estimated 46.3% employment rate, with 23.3% of the population holding a bachelor's degree or higher and 83.6% holding a high school diploma.

The top five reported ancestries (people were allowed to report up to two ancestries, thus the figures will generally add to more than 100%) were English (82.7%), Spanish (17.2%), Indo-European (0.0%), Asian and Pacific Islander (0.1%), and Other (0.0%).

=== Racial and ethnic composition ===
Dade City, Florida – racial and ethnic composition Note: the US Census treats Hispanic/Latino as an ethnic category. This table excludes Latinos from the racial categories and assigns them to a separate category. Hispanics/Latinos may be of any race.
Race / ethnicity (NH = non-Hispanic)	Pop. 2000	Pop. 2010	Pop. 2020	% 2000	% 2010	% 2020
White alone (NH)	3,616	3,682	3,824	58.44%	57.20%	52.56%
Black or African American alone (NH)	1,482	1,294	1,263	23.95%	20.10%	17.36%
Native American or Alaska Native alone (NH)	19	6	21	0.31%	0.09%	0.29%
Asian alone (NH)	37	28	41	0.60%	0.43%	0.56%
Pacific Islander alone (NH)	3	9	5	0.05%	0.14%	0.07%
Other race alone (NH)	5	7	19	0.08%	0.11%	0.26%
Mixed race or multiracial (NH)	51	82	238	0.82%	1.27%	3.27%
Hispanic or Latino (any race)	975	1,329	1,864	15.76%	20.65%	25.62%
Total	6,188	6,437	7,275	100.00%	100.00%	100.00%

=== 2020 census ===
As of the 2020 census, Dade City had a population of 7,275, with 2,718 households and 1,707 families residing in the city.

The population density was 1,177.9 inhabitants per square mile (454.8/km^{2}), and the housing unit density was 522.5 per square mile (201.7/km^{2}).

The median age was 39.1 years. 23.7% of residents were under the age of 18, 3.4% were under 5 years of age, and 21.7% were 65 years of age or older. The gender makeup of the city was 45.9% male and 54.1% female. For every 100 females there were 87.8 males, and for every 100 females age 18 and over there were 82.5 males age 18 and over.

98.2% of residents lived in urban areas, while 1.8% lived in rural areas.

There were 3,227 housing units, of which 15.8% were vacant. The homeowner vacancy rate was 2.7% and the rental vacancy rate was 13.0%.

Of the 2,718 households, 33.0% had children under the age of 18 living in them. Of all households, 38.4% were married-couple households, 17.9% were households with a male householder and no spouse or partner present, and 36.4% were households with a female householder and no spouse or partner present. About 29.4% of all households were made up of individuals, and 14.6% had someone living alone who was 65 years of age or older.

=== 2010 census ===
As of the 2010 census, there were 6,437 people, 2,500 households, and 1,528 families residing in the city. The population density was 1,087.6 inhabitants per square mile (419.9/km^{2}). There were 3,049 housing units at an average density of 515.0 per square mile (198.8/km^{2}). The racial makeup of the city was 67.35% White, 20.44% African American, 0.42% Native American, 0.43% Asian, 0.16% Pacific Islander, 8.65% from some other races and 2.55% from two or more races. Hispanic or Latino people of any race were 20.65% of the population.

== Arts and culture ==
The Kumquat Festival is hosted annually, and celebrates the locally grown kumquat, a small citrus fruit.

The Dade City Cruise-In car show occurs in the courthouse square.

The annual Dade City Christmas Parade is held in December.

=== Library ===
The Hugh Embry Library, currently located on 4th Street in downtown Dade City, was opened in 1904 when its namesake, then 25 years old, was recovering from an illness. Embry had a strong desire to read, but at that time there was no public library located in Dade City. He solicited donations of books from local households, and developed a small library in the Embry home on Church Street (now the site of the U.S. Post Office).

His efforts helped generate great enthusiasm in the community for a much more extensive library, culminating in the establishment of the Pasco County Library Association in 1905.. After Embry's death at the age of 28 due to tuberculosis, the library initially faltered. Efforts of active community members and civic organizations such as the Dade City Woman's Club kept the library open. The library was relocated several times over the next five decades, finally reaching its current location in 1963. The library underwent a complete renovation in the late 1980s, with the current 7,200-square-foot (670 m^{2}) building opening in 1991. More recently, the library underwent renovations in 2021. The library reopened on May 30, 2023.

== Infrastructure ==
=== Major roads ===
- U.S. Route 98 in Florida/U.S. Route 301 in Florida
- Florida State Road 52
- County Road 35 Alternate
- County Road 41
- County Road 52
- County Road 52 Alternate
- County Road 578

=== Railroads ===
Passenger rail service was previously available at the city's Atlantic Coast Line depot. Since 2004, the depot is only served by Amtrak Thruway service to Jacksonville and Lakeland.

CSX Transportation's Wildwood Subdivision provides freight rail service to Dade City.

=== Local bus service ===
Pasco County Public Transportation provides local bus service.

=== Public safety and healthcare ===
The Dade City Police Department provides law enforcement. Pasco County Fire Rescue provides fire protection and emergency medical services.

AdventHealth Dade City is a local hospital.

== Notable people ==
- Martha Barnett, attorney and former president of the American Bar Association
- Kurt S. Browning, Republican politician and former Superintendent of Schools for Pasco County, Florida
- Jim Courier, professional tennis player
- Dallas Eakins, NHL coach
- Dave Eiland, MLB pitcher
- Joey Ivie, NFL player
- Don Lewis, businessman and former husband of Carole Baskin, who disappeared in 1997
- Roy Roberts, actor
- Michael Penix Jr., NFL player
