= 2002 Dallas Cowboys season =

NFL team season

- Owner: Jerry Jones
- General manager: Jerry Jones
- Head coach: Dave Campo
- Home stadium: Texas Stadium

Results
- Record: 5–11
- Division place: 4th NFC East
- Playoffs: Did not qualify
- All-Pros: La'Roi Glover (2nd team)
- Pro Bowlers: La'Roi Glover DT

Uniform
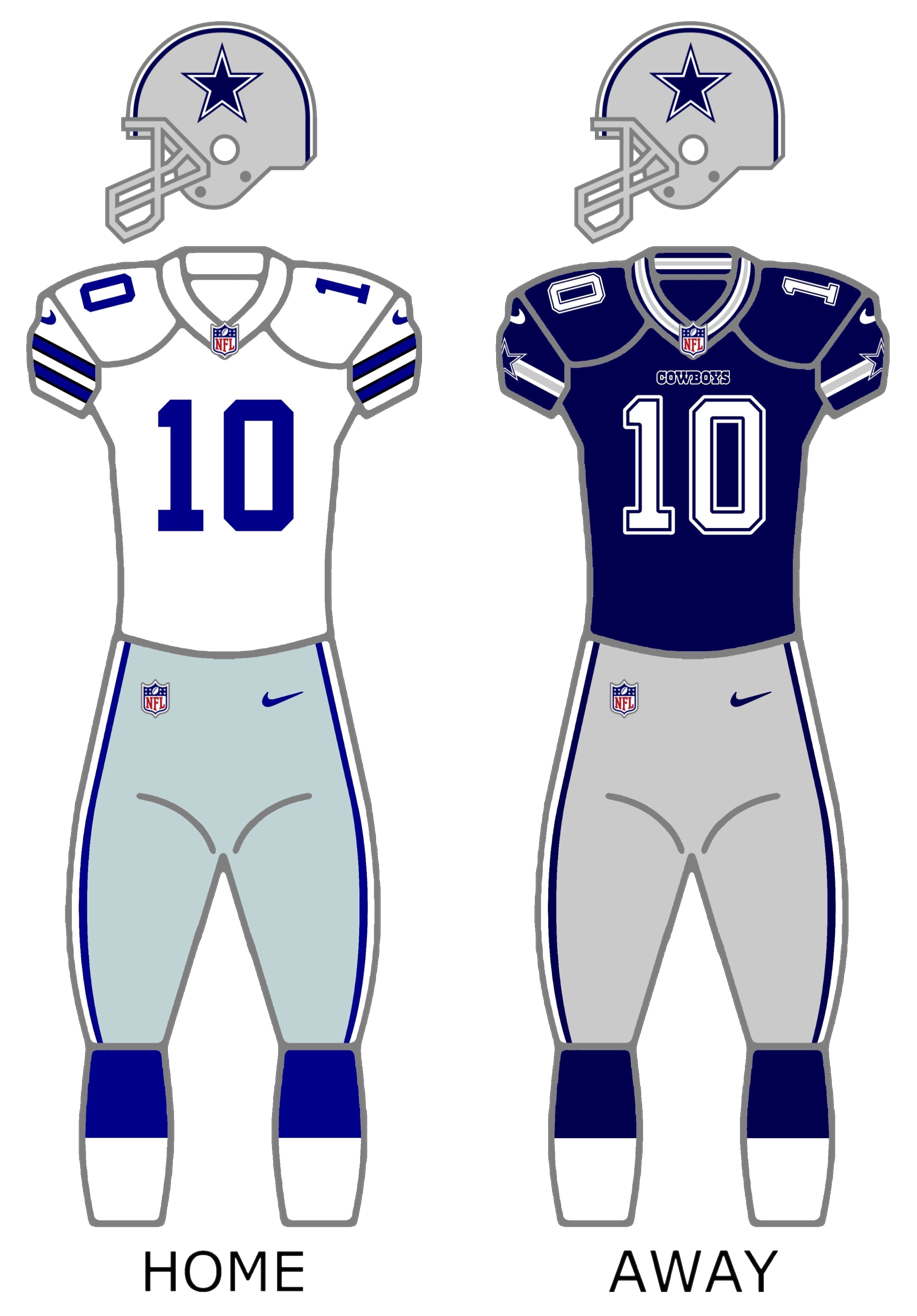

The 2002 Dallas Cowboys season was the 43rd season for the team in the National Football League (NFL) and the third and final under head coach Dave Campo. It was Emmitt Smith's 13th and final season with the team, officially marking the end of the famed "triplets" tenure in Dallas after wide receiver Michael Irvin was forced to retire prematurely after the 1999 season and quarterback Troy Aikman retired prior to the start of the 2001 season. All three players would eventually be inducted to the Pro Football Hall of Fame. It was also the last of three consecutive 5–11 finishes for the Cowboys, which began in 2000. Texas Stadium also saw new RealGrass Turf surface by week 5, replacing the AstroTurf. The Cowboys' 5–11 record meant that they were the only NFL team operational from 2000 to 2002 that did not win more than 5 games in a season and would not have another consecutive losing seasons until 2024 and 2025.

== Offseason ==
Additions	Subtractions
TE Tony McGee (Bengals)	QB Ryan Leaf (Seahawks/Retirement)
LB Kevin Hardy (Jaguars)	LS Mike Solwold (Buccaneers)
DT La'Roi Glover (Saints)	WR Darrin Chiaverini (Falcons)
WR Darnay Scott (Bengals)	FS Izell Reese (Broncos)
	C Mark Stepnoski (retirement)

Despite an off-season filled with promise, the season would again prove to be a disaster. Former Cincinnati Bengals offensive coordinator and head coach Bruce Coslet was brought in to run the offense for Dallas. Even though he had been dismissed by Cincinnati, his history of high-powered offenses while running the Bill Walsh–style West Coast offense provided hope for the Cowboys. A promising draft which included former Oklahoma Sooners All-American selection safety Roy Williams in the first round and the free agent addition of Pro Bowl defensive tackle La'Roi Glover provided even more hope for weary Cowboys fans. The team was also covered throughout training camp and featured on the HBO series Hard Knocks with a strong emphasis on the anticipation of running back Emmitt Smith's road to the NFL's all-time rushing record.

=== 2002 expansion draft ===
Dallas Cowboys selected during the expansion draft
Round	Overall	Name	Position	Expansion team
—	19	Johnny Huggins	Tight end	Houston Texans

=== 2002 draft class ===
2002 Dallas Cowboys draft
Round	Pick	Player	Position	College	Notes
1	8	Roy Williams *	S	Oklahoma	
2	37	Andre Gurode *	C	Colorado	
2	63	Antonio Bryant	WR	Pittsburgh	
3	75	Derek Ross	CB	Ohio State	
4	129	Jamar Martin	FB	Ohio State	
5	168	Pete Hunter	DB	Virginia Union	
6	179	Tyson Walter	G	Ohio State	
6	208	Deveren Johnson	WR	Sacred Heart	compensatory
6	211	Bob Slowikowski	TE	Virginia Tech	compensatory
Made roster † Pro Football Hall of Fame * Made at least one Pro Bowl during career

Notes

- The Cowboys traded their original first-round (No. 6 overall) selection to the Kansas City Chiefs in exchange for first (No. 8 overall) and third-round (No. 75 overall) selections, and a 2003 sixth-round (No. 186 overall) selection.
- The Cowboys traded their original third (No. 72 overall), fourth (No. 104 overall) and fifth-round (No. 140 overall) selections to the Chicago Bears in exchange for second (No. 63 overall) and fourth-round (No. 129 overall) selections.
- The Cowboys traded return man Jeff Ogden to the Miami Dolphins in exchange for a seventh-round (No. 237 overall) selection.
- The Cowboys traded their seventh-round (No. 237 overall) and 2003 fifth-round (No. 168 overall) selection to the New England Patriots for a fifth-round (No. 168 overall) selection.
- The Cowboys traded their 2001 fourth-round (No. 102 overall) and 2002 seventh-round (No. 217 overall) selections to the Atlanta Falcons in exchange for tight end O.J. Santiago.

=== Undrafted free agents ===
2002 undrafted free agents of note
Player	Position	College
DaShawn Abram	Cornerback	Wyoming
Darius Bryant	Defensive Tackle	NC State
Khary Campbell	Linebacker	Bowling Green
Sam Clemons	Quarterback	Western Illinois
Billy Cundiff	Placekicker	Drake
Woodrow Dantzler	Running back	Clemson
Keith Davis	Safety	Sam Houston State
Kevin DeRonde	Defensive End	Iowa State
Filip Filipović	Punter	South Dakota
Ennis Haywood	Running back	Iowa State
Chad Hutchinson	Quarterback	Stanford
Ray Robinson	Running back	NC State
Joey Slaten	Tackle	SMU

== Personnel ==
=== Staff ===
2002 Dallas Cowboys staff
Front office: Owner, President and General Manager – Jerry Jones; COO, Director of Player Personnel, and Executive Vice President – Stephen Jones; Chief Sales and Marketing Officer, Vice President, and General Counsel – Jerry Jones, Jr.; Assistant Director Player Personnel – Todd Williams; Director of Football Operations – Bruce Mays; Director of College and Pro Scouting – Larry Lancewell; Head coaches: Head coach – Dave Campo; Offensive coaches: Offensive coordinator – Bruce Coslet; Quarterbacks – Wade Wilson; Running backs – Galen Hall; Wide receivers – Wes Chandler; Tight ends – Greg Seamon; Offensive line – Frank Verducci	Defensive coaches: Defensive coordinator – Mike Zimmer; Defensive nickel Package/Assistant – Bill Bates; Linebackers – Gary Gibbs; Secondary – Clancy Pendergast; Defensive ends – Jim Jeffcoat; Defensive tackle – Andre Patterson; Special teams coaches: Special teams – Joe Avezzano; Kickers/Quality Control – Steve Hoffman; Strength and conditioning: Strength and conditioning – Joe Juraszek; Assistant Strength and conditioning – Tony Ollison; Assistant Strength and conditioning – Bennie Wylie

=== Roster ===
Dallas Cowboys 2002 roster
Quarterbacks: 17 Quincy Carter; 7 Chad Hutchinson; 5 Clint Stoerner; Running backs: 29 Woody Dantzler KR; 42 Troy Hambrick; 35 Jason McKie FB; 22 Emmitt Smith; 44 Robert Thomas FB; 32 Michael Wiley; Wide receivers: 88 Antonio Bryant; 84 Joey Galloway PR; 87 Ken-Yon Rambo KR; 85 Darnay Scott; 80 Reggie Swinton KR/PR; 89 Randal Williams; Tight ends: 86 Mike Lucky; 82 Tony McGee; 83 James Whalen	Offensive linemen: 76 Flozell Adams T; 70 Javiar Collins T; 65 Andre Gurode G; 68 Matt Lehr C/G; 77 Solomon Page G/T; 69 Ross Tucker G; 78 Kurt Vollers T; 71 Tyson Walter C; Defensive linemen: 96 Ebenezer Ekuban DE; 98 Greg Ellis DE; 92 Demetric Evans DE; 97 La'Roi Glover DT; 94 Michael Myers DT; 60 John Nix DT; 75 Brandon Noble DT; 64 Daleroy Stewart DT; 95 Colston Weatherington DE; 93 Peppi Zellner DE	Linebackers: 52 Dexter Coakley OLB; 51 Kevin Hardy OLB; 57 Louis Mackey OLB; 59 Dat Nguyen MLB; 55 Markus Steele MLB; Defensive backs: 40 Keith Davis FS; 24 Tony Dixon SS; 27 Mario Edwards CB; 23 Dwayne Goodrich CB; 47 Pete Hunter CB; 25 Jermaine Jones CB; 20 Derek Ross CB; 21 Lynn Scott SS; 31 Roy Williams FS; Special teams: 3 Billy Cundiff K; 10 Filip Filipović P; 58 Jeff Grau LS	Reserve lists: 73 Larry Allen G (IR); 50 Jamal Brooks LB (IR); 67 Dan Collins G (IR); 81 Rocket Ismail WR (IR); 15 Anthony Lucas WR (IR); 34 Jamar Martin FB (IR); 79 Marques McFadden G/T (IR); 66 Jeremy McKinney G (NF-Inj.); 48 Jeff Robinson LS/TE (IR); 45 Bob Slowikowski TE (IR); 28 Darren Woodson S (IR); Practice squad: 26 Markese Fitzgerald CB; 46 Ennis Haywood RB; 13 Deveren Johnson WR; 90 Derrius Monroe DE; 72 Dave Volk T; Rookies in italics 53 active, 11 inactive, 5 practice squad

== Regular season ==
The air was immediately let out of the Cowboys' balloon in the opening regular-season contest which saw the team lose to first-year expansion team and new cross-state rival, the Houston Texans. Though quarterback Quincy Carter again opened the season as the starter, he was eventually benched in favor of newly signed Chad Hutchinson who, until that year, had been a pitcher for the St. Louis Cardinals after leaving Stanford as a two-sport star. Many believed that owner Jerry Jones pressured head coach Dave Campo into starting Hutchinson much too early, due in part to the large signing bonus Jones paid to acquire the quarterback. Regardless, neither quarterback proved effective and the team once again spiraled towards a losing season.

It is believed 2002 was the first time an NFL franchise had five African American starters on their offensive line, when the Cowboys lined up rookie center Andre Gurode, tackles Flozell Adams and Solomon Page, guards Larry Allen and Kelvin Garmon.

The Cowboys kept making NFL history on October 27 at home against the Seattle Seahawks. Despite a close loss, Emmitt Smith broke the all-time career yardage rushing record previously held by Walter Payton. The game was stopped momentarily in recognition of the moment, allowing an emotional Smith to briefly celebrate with teammates both current and past who attended the game, as well as members of Payton's family. Smith later scored the 125th rushing touchdown of his career on the same drive. The milestone moment would provide the lone bright spot of the year for the team and Smith, who failed to reach the 1,000-yard rushing mark for the season for the first time in his career since his rookie season of 1990. Overshadowed by the NFL rushing landmark, safety Darren Woodson quietly became the Cowboys' all-time leading tackler.

During a late-season loss to the Philadelphia Eagles, reports began to surface that owner Jerry Jones had secretly met with Bill Parcells, the former head coach of the New York Giants, New England Patriots and New York Jets, about the Cowboys' head-coaching position, on board Jones's private jet. Though this would prove to be a critical move to the Cowboys' future success, it was nonetheless embarrassing for current head coach Dave Campo, who had received no word that any potential moves were pending, and Jones was roundly criticized for the incident. On-field ineptitude and off-field controversy once again led to a 5–11 season, the team's third consecutive such finish. Dave Campo was predictably dismissed after the season and would be the last head coach to have multiple losing seasons until Mike McCarthy in 2020 and 2024.

Notable additions to the team included wide receiver Antonio Bryant and center Andre Gurode.

=== Schedule ===
Week	Date	Opponent	Result	Venue	Attendance	Record
1	September 8	at Houston Texans	**L** 10–19	Reliant Stadium	69,604	0–1
2	September 15	Tennessee Titans	**W** 21–13	Texas Stadium	62,527	1–1
3	September 22	at **Philadelphia Eagles**	**L** 13–44	Veterans Stadium	65,537	1–2
4	September 29	at St. Louis Rams	**W** 13–10	Edward Jones Dome	66,165	2–2
5	October 6	**New York Giants**	**L** 17–21	Texas Stadium	63,447	2–3
6	October 13	Carolina Panthers	**W** 14–13	Texas Stadium	61,773	3–3
7	October 20	at Arizona Cardinals	**L** 6–9 (OT)	Sun Devil Stadium	59,702	3–4
8	October 27	Seattle Seahawks	**L** 14–17	Texas Stadium	63,854	3–5
9	November 3	at Detroit Lions	**L** 7–9	Ford Field	61,789	3–6
10	Bye					
11	November 17	at Indianapolis Colts	**L** 3–20	RCA Dome	57,057	3–7
12	November 24	Jacksonville Jaguars	**W** 21–19	Texas Stadium	62,204	4–7
13	November 28	**Washington Redskins**	**W** 27–20	Texas Stadium	63,606	5–7
14	December 8	San Francisco 49ers	**L** 27–31	Texas Stadium	64,097	5–8
15	December 15	at **New York Giants**	**L** 7–37	Giants Stadium	78,698	5–9
16	December 21	**Philadelphia Eagles**	**L** 3–27	Texas Stadium	63,209	5–10
17	December 29	at **Washington Redskins**	**L** 14–20	FedExField	84,142	5–11

Note: Intra-division opponents are in bold text.

=== Game summaries ===
==== Week 2: vs. Tennessee Titans ====
Week 2: Tennessee Titans at Dallas Cowboys

Quarter	1	2	3	4	Total
Titans	7	3	0	3	**13**
**Cowboys**	0	7	7	7	**21**

at Texas Stadium, Irving, Texas

- Date: September 15, 2002
- Game time: 12:00 PM
- Game weather: Cloudy skies, 81 °F (27.2 °C)
- Game attendance: 62,527
- Referee: Ed Hochuli (85)
- TV announcers (CBS): Kevin Harlan, Randy Cross, Beasley Reece
- Recap, Game Book

Game information

**First quarter'**

- TEN – Frank Wycheck 1-yard pass from Steve McNair (Joe Nedney kick), 0:00. Titans 7-0. **Drive: 12 plays, 85 yards, 8:27.**

**Second quarter**

- DAL – Tony McGee 17-yard pass from Quincy Carter (Billy Cundiff kick), 12:00. Tied 7-7. **Drive: 6 plays, 71 yards, 3:00.**
- TEN – Joe Nedney 37-yard field goal, 5:31. Titans 10-7. **Drive: 13 plays, 55 yards, 6:29.**

**Third quarter**

- DAL – Dexter Coakley 52-yard interception return (Billy Cundiff kick), 3:10. Cowboys 14-10.

**Fourth quarter**

- DAL – Joey Galloway 38-yard pass from Quincy Carter (Billy Cundiff kick), 11:25. Cowboys 21-10. **Drive: 7 plays, 95 yards, 3:22.**
- TEN – Joe Nedney 53-yard field goal, 5:18. Cowboys 21-13. **Drive: 8 plays, 28 yards, 2:36.**

**Top passers**

- TEN – Steve McNair – 20/38, 226 yards, TD, INT
- DAL – Quincy Carter – 14/24, 240 yards, 2 TD

**Top rushers**

- TEN – Eddie George – 19 rushes, 65 yards
- DAL – Emmitt Smith – 18 rushes, 59 yards

**Top receivers**

- TEN – Derrick Mason – 7 receptions, 118 yards
- DAL – Joey Galloway – 5 receptions, 88 yards, TD

==== Week 7: at Arizona Cardinals ====
Week 7: Dallas Cowboys (3–3) at Arizona Cardinals (3–2) – Game summary

Quarter	1	2	3	4	OT	Total
Cowboys	0	0	6	0	0	**6**
**Cardinals**	3	3	0	0	3	**9**

at Sun Devil Stadium, Tempe, Arizona

- Date: October 20
- Game time: 2:15 p.m. MST
- Game weather: 81 °F (27 °C)
- Game attendance: 59,702
- Referee: Dick Hantak
- TV announcers (FOX): Pat Summerall, Brian Baldinger, Kevin McCabe
- Box Score

Game information

**First quarter**

- ARI – Bill Gramática 41-yard field goal, 10:50. Cardinals 3–0.

**Second quarter**

- ARI – Bill Gramática 23-yard field goal, 0:00. Cardinals 6–0.

**Third quarter**

- DAL – Antonio Bryant 78-yard pass from Quincy Carter (kick failed), 7:50. Tied 6–6.

**Fourth quarter**

- No scoring plays

**Overtime**

- ARI – Bill Gramática 40-yard field goal, 3:10. Cardinals 9–6.

**Top passers**

- DAL – Quincy Carter – 13/22, 202 yards, TD, 4 INT
- ARI – Jake Plummer – 23/46, 232 yards

**Top rushers**

- DAL – Emmitt Smith – 22 rushes, 82 yards
- ARI – Thomas Jones – 22 rushes, 68 yards

**Top receivers**

- DAL – Antonio Bryant – 3 receptions, 96 yards, TD
- ARI – David Boston – 6 receptions, 110 yards

**Team** – pass – rush – total – to

- DAL – 202 – 148 – 342 – 4
- ARI – 232 – 152 – 380 – 1

==== Week 8: vs. Seattle Seahawks ====
Week 8: Seattle Seahawks (1–5) at Dallas Cowboys (3–4) – Game summary

Quarter	1	2	3	4	Total
**Seahawks**	0	7	0	10	**17**
Cowboys	0	0	7	7	**14**

at Texas Stadium, Irving, Texas

- Date: October 27
- Game time: 12:04pm local
- Game weather: cloudy, 60 °F (16 °C), 96% humidity, wind calm
- Game attendance: 63,854
- Referee: Mike Carey
- TV announcers (Fox): Pat Summerall, Daryl Johnston, Pam Oliver
- Gamecenter, Gamebook

Game information

**First quarter**

- No scoring plays

**Second quarter**

- SEA – Shaun Alexander 2-yard run (Rian Lindell kick), 0:12 (SEA 7–0)

**Third quarter**

- DAL – Joey Galloway 39-yard pass from Chad Hutchinson (Billy Cundiff kick), 0:26 (Tied 7–7)

**Fourth quarter**

- SEA – Shaun Alexander 5-yard run (Rian Lindell kick), 10:16 (SEA 14–7)
- DAL – Emmitt Smith 1-yard run (Billy Cundiff kick), 5:35 (Tied 14–14)
- SEA – Rian Lindell 20-yard field goal, 0:25 (SEA 17–14)

**Top passers**

- SEA – Matt Hasselbeck: 12/19, 131 yds, 1 INT
- DAL – Chad Hutchinson: 12/24, 145 yds, 1 TD

**Top rushers**

- SEA – Shaun Alexander: 23 car, 58 yds, 2 TD
- DAL – Emmitt Smith: 24 car, 109 yds, 1 TD

**Top receivers**

- SEA – Bobby Engram: 6 rec, 69 yds
- DAL – Joey Galloway: 4 rec, 62 yds, 1 TD

**Team** – pass – rush – total – to

- SEA – 170 – 97 – 267 – 2
- DAL – 132 – 105 – 237 – 1

==== Week 9: at Detroit Lions ====
Week 9: Dallas Cowboys at Detroit Lions

Quarter	1	2	3	4	Total
Cowboys	0	0	0	7	**7**
**Lions**	0	0	6	3	**9**

at Ford Field, Detroit, Michigan

- Date: November 3, 2002
- Game time: 1:00 pm
- Game weather: None (indoor stadium)
- Game attendance: 64,013
- Referee: Walt Coleman (65)
- TV announcers (Fox): Pat Summerall, Brian Baldinger
- Recap, Game Book

Game information

**First quarter**

- No scoring plays.

**Second quarter**

- No scoring plays.

**Third quarter**

- DET – Jason Hanson 42-yard field goal, 12:06. Lions 3–0. **Drive: 4 plays, -7 yards, 2:08.**
- DET – Jason Hanson 44-yard field goal, 6:09. Lions 6–0. **Drive: 7 plays, 20 yards, 2:27.**

**Fourth quarter**

- DAL – Troy Hambrick 3-yard run (Billy Cundiff kick), 7:42. Cowboys 7–6. **Drive: 12 plays, 80 yards, 6:06.**
- DET – Jason Hanson 43-yard field goal, 0:48. Lions 9–7. **Drive: 9 plays, 38 yards, 2:59.**

**Top passers**

- DAL – Chad Hutchinson – 22/39, 208 yards
- DET – Joey Harrington – 14/33, 104 yards, 2 INT

**Top rushers**

- DAL – Emmitt Smith – 16 rushes, 39 yards
- DET – James Stewart – 19 rushes, 50 yards

**Top receivers**

- DAL – Joey Galloway – 6 receptions, 56 yards
- DET – James Stewart – 4 receptions, 41 yards

==== Week 12: vs. Jacksonville Jaguars ====
Jacksonville Jaguars at Dallas Cowboys

Quarter	1	2	3	4	Total
Jaguars	0	5	0	14	**19**
**Cowboys**	0	7	7	7	**21**

at Texas Stadium, Irving, Texas

- Date: November 24, 2002
- Game time: 12:00 p.m. CST
- Game weather: Partly Cloudy, 63 °F (17 °C)
- Game attendance: 62,204
- Referee: Larry Nemmers
- TV announcers (CBS): Don Criqui and Steve Tasker
- Recap, Game Book

Game information

**First quarter**

- No scoring plays.

**Second quarter**

- JAX – Ross Tucker tackled in the end zone by Rob Meier for a safety, 10:18. Jaguars 2–0.
- DAL – Joey Galloway 43-yard pass from Chad Hutchinson (Billy Cundiff kick), 2:17. Cowboys 7–2. **Drive: 4 plays, 69 yards, 2:12.**
- JAX – Tim Seder 31-yard field goal, 0:00. Cowboys 7–5. **Drive: 10 plays, 65 yards, 2:17.**

**Third quarter**

- DAL – Emmitt Smith 1-yard run (Billy Cundiff kick), 4:15. Cowboys 14–5. **Drive: 13 plays, 99 yards, 7:05.**

**Fourth quarter**

- JAX – Stacey Mack 3-yard run (Tim Seder kick), 14:16. Cowboys 14–12. **Drive: 8 plays, 38 yards, 3:36.**
- DAL – Joey Galloway 11-yard pass from Chad Hutchinson (Billy Cundiff kick), 11:09. Cowboys 21–12. **Drive: 6 plays, 65 yards, 3:07.**
- JAX – Kevin Lockett 8-yard pass from Mark Brunell (Tim Seder kick), 1:54. Cowboys 21–19. **Drive: 9 plays, 70 yards, 1:44.**

Top passers

- JAX – Mark Brunell – 22/40, 202 yards, TD, INT
- DAL – Chad Hutchinson – 16/24, 301 yards, 2 TD, 2 INT

Top rushers

- JAX – Fred Taylor – 20 rushes, 100 yards
- DAL – Emmitt Smith – 20 rushes, 73 yards, 1 TD

Top receivers

- JAX – Jimmy Smith – 13 receptions, 90 yards
- DAL – Joey Galloway – 9 receptions, 144 yards, 2 TD

=== Standings ===
==== Division ====
NFC East
	W	L	T	PCT	DIV	CONF	PF	PA	STK
^{(1)} Philadelphia Eagles	12	4	0	.750	5–1	11–1	415	241	L1
^{(5)} New York Giants	10	6	0	.625	5–1	8–4	320	279	W4
Washington Redskins	7	9	0	.438	1–5	4–8	307	365	W2
Dallas Cowboys	5	11	0	.313	1–5	3–9	217	329	L4

==== Conference ====
NFC
#	Team	Division	W	L	T	PCT	DIV	CONF	SOS	SOV
**Division leaders**
1 (Note: Philadelphia finished ahead of Tampa Bay and Green Bay based on conference record (11–1 vs 9–3/9–3).)	Philadelphia Eagles	East	12	4	0	.750	5–1	11–1	.469	.432
2 (Note: Tampa Bay finished ahead of Green Bay based on head-to-head victory.)	Tampa Bay Buccaneers	South	12	4	0	.750	4–2	9–3	.482	.432
3	Green Bay Packers	North	12	4	0	.750	5–1	9–3	.451	.414
4	San Francisco 49ers	West	10	6	0	.625	5–1	8–4	.504	.450
**Wild Cards**
5	New York Giants	East	10	6	0	.625	5–1	8–4	.482	.450
6	Atlanta Falcons	South	9	6	1	.594	4–2	7–5	.494	.429
**Did not qualify for the postseason**
7	New Orleans Saints	South	9	7	0	.563	3–3	7–5	.498	.566
8 (Note: St. Louis finished ahead of Seattle based on division record (4–2 to 2–4).)	St. Louis Rams	West	7	9	0	.438	4–2	5–7	.508	.446
9	Seattle Seahawks	West	7	9	0	.438	2–4	5–7	.506	.433
10 (Note: Washington finished ahead of Carolina based on common games (2–3 to 1–4))	Washington Redskins	East	7	9	0	.438	1–5	4–8	.527	.438
11	Carolina Panthers	South	7	9	0	.438	1–5	4–8	.486	.357
12	Minnesota Vikings	North	6	10	0	.375	4–2	5–7	.498	.417
13 (Note: Arizona finished ahead of Dallas based on head-to-head victory.)	Arizona Cardinals	West	5	11	0	.313	1–5	5–7	.500	.400
14	Dallas Cowboys	East	5	11	0	.313	1–5	3–9	.500	.475
15	Chicago Bears	North	4	12	0	.250	2–4	3–9	.521	.430
16	Detroit Lions	North	3	13	0	.188	1–5	3–9	.494	.375
**Tiebreakers** (Note: When breaking ties for three or more teams under the NFL's rules, they are first broken within divisions, then comparing only the highest-ranked remaining team from each division.)

== Awards and records ==
- Darren Woodson, Athletes in Action/Bart Starr Award

== Publications ==
The Football Encyclopedia ISBN 0-312-11435-4
Total Football ISBN 0-06-270170-3
Cowboys Have Always Been My Heroes ISBN 0-446-51950-2
