= 2001 Dallas Cowboys season =

NFL team season

- Owner: Jerry Jones
- General manager: Jerry Jones
- Head coach: Dave Campo
- Home stadium: Texas Stadium

Results
- Record: 5–11
- Division place: 5th NFC East
- Playoffs: Did not qualify
- Pro Bowlers: G Larry Allen; LB Dexter Coakley

Uniform
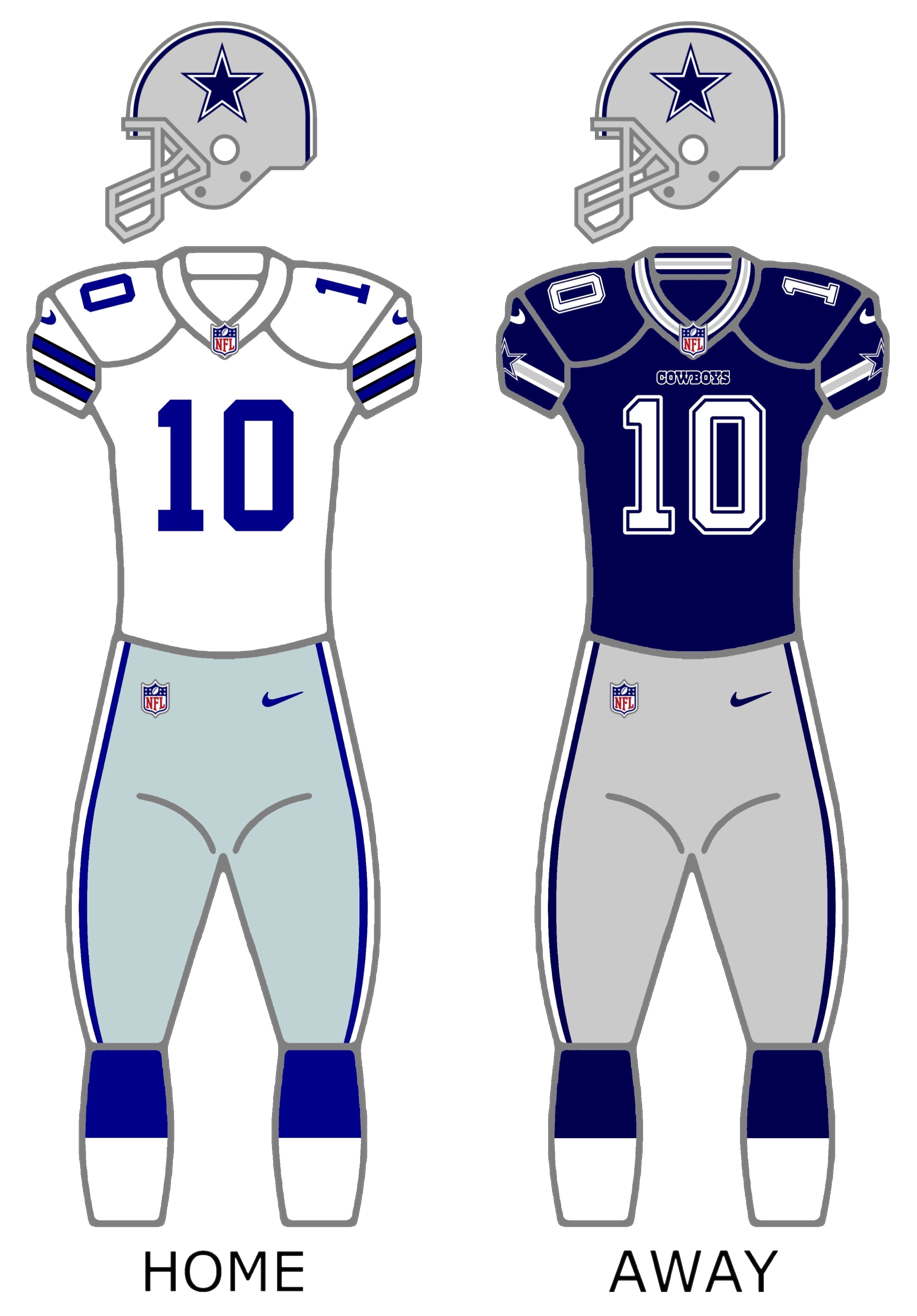

The 2001 Dallas Cowboys season was the team's 42nd in the National Football League (NFL) and second under head coach Dave Campo. The Cowboys matched their record from the season before, going 5–11 and missing the playoffs, finishing last in the NFC East. For the first time since 1988, Troy Aikman was not on the Cowboys roster as quarterback, as the three-time Super Bowl champion retired, after playing for the team from 1989 to 2000. For the only time, Pat Summerall and John Madden did not call any Cowboys games for Fox all year.

== Offseason ==
Additions	Subtractions
WR Darrin Chiaverini (Browns)	QB Randall Cunningham (Ravens)
QB Tony Banks (Ravens)	QB Troy Aikman (retirement)
	WR James McKnight (Dolphins)
	CB Ryan McNeil (Chargers)
	DT Leon Lett (Broncos)

An eventful off-season created a lot of buzz but little change in the Cowboys' fortunes. Franchise quarterback Troy Aikman, after suffering a pair of concussions the previous season, was released by the team. Unable to sign on with another team — in part due to his long history of concussions — Aikman announced his retirement at an emotional and lengthy press conference later in the off-season. This left running back Emmitt Smith as the last of the famed "triplets" from the Cowboys' Super Bowl victories. Veteran quarterback Tony Banks was signed in the off-season from the Super Bowl champion Baltimore Ravens as an immediate replacement, and owner Jerry Jones hand-picked Georgia quarterback Quincy Carter with a second-round draft choice as the quarterback of the future. Many saw the Carter pick as quite a reach considering Carter's inconsistent career at Georgia and his low draft rating by several other teams.

== 2001 draft class ==
2001 Dallas Cowboys draft
Round	Pick	Player	Position	College	Notes
2	53	Quincy Carter	QB	Georgia	
2	56	Tony Dixon	SS	Alabama	
3	93	Willie Blade	DT	Mississippi State	compensatory
4	122	Markus Steele	LB	Southern California	
5	137	Matt Lehr	G	Virginia Tech	
6	171	Daleroy Stewart	DT	Southern Mississippi	
7	207	Colston Weatherington	DL	Central Missouri State	
7	240	John Nix	DT	Southern Mississippi	compensatory
7	242	Char-ron Dorsey	OT	Florida State	compensatory
Made roster † Pro Football Hall of Fame * Made at least one Pro Bowl during career

Notes

- The Cowboys traded their 2000 first-round (No. 19 overall) and 2001 first-round (No. 7 overall) selections to the Seattle Seahawks in exchange for wide receiver Joey Galloway.
- The Cowboys traded their original second-round selection (No. 37 overall) to the Indianapolis Colts in exchange for second- (No. 52 overall) and third-round (No. 81 overall) selections.
- The Cowboys traded their second-round (No. 52 overall, from Indianapolis) selection to the Miami Dolphins in exchange for second (No. 56 overall) and fourth-round (No. 122 overall) selections.
- The Cowboys traded two third-round (Nos. 70 and 81 overall) selections to the New Orleans Saints in exchange for a second-round (No. 53 overall) selection.
- The Cowboys traded their fourth-round (No. 102 overall) and 2002 seventh-round (No. 217 overall) selections to the Atlanta Falcons in exchange for tight end O.J. Santiago.

=== Undrafted free agents ===
2001 undrafted free agents of note
Player	Position	College
Del Bates	Cornerback	Nevada
Jason Bell	Cornerback	UCLA
Cleavon Bradshaw	Cornerback	Idaho
Javiar Collins	Defensive tackle	Northwestern
Demetric Evans	Defensive end	Georgia
J. J. Jones	Linebacker	Arkansas
Travis Ortega	Safety	Rice
Lynn Scott	Safety	Northwestern Oklahoma State
Colin Sears	Tackle	Auburn
Tony Taylor	Running back	Northwestern State
James Wagstaff	Tackle	North Carolina
Kenny Wilkerson	Fullback	Mississippi State

== Roster ==
Dallas Cowboys 2001 roster
Quarterbacks: 17 Quincy Carter; 16 Ryan Leaf; 5 Clint Stoerner; Running backs: 42 Troy Hambrick; 22 Emmitt Smith; 32 Michael Wiley KR; 48 Terry Witherspoon FB; Wide receivers: 85 Darrin Chiaverini; 84 Joey Galloway; 81 Rocket Ismail; 87 Ken-Yon Rambo; 80 Reggie Swinton KR/PR; 89 Randal Williams; Tight ends: 88 Jackie Harris; 49 Johnny Huggins; 86 Mike Lucky	Offensive linemen: 76 Flozell Adams T; 73 Larry Allen G; 70 Javiar Collins T; 79 Char-ron Dorsey T; 66 Ben Fricke C/G; 61 Kelvin Garmon G; 63 Aaron Gibson T; 71 Alcender Jackson G; 68 Matt Lehr C/G; 53 Mark Stepnoski C; Defensive linemen: 98 Greg Ellis DE; 92 Demetric Evans DE; 90 Byron Frisch DE; 72 Dwayne Missouri DE; 94 Michael Myers DT; 60 John Nix DT; 75 Brandon Noble DT; 93 Peppi Zellner DE	Linebackers: 51 Keith Adams MLB; 50 Jamal Brooks OLB; 54 Marq Cerqua OLB; 52 Dexter Coakley OLB; 56 Orantes Grant OLB; 59 Dat Nguyen MLB; 55 Markus Steele OLB; Defensive backs: 33 Jason Bell CB; 41 Pat Dennis CB; 24 Tony Dixon SS; 27 Mario Edwards CB; 38 Duane Hawthorne CB; 43 Izell Reese CB/S; 21 Lynn Scott SS; 31 George Teague FS; 28 Darren Woodson SS; Special teams: 9 Jon Hilbert K; 4 Micah Knorr P; 45 Mike Solwold LS	Reserve lists: 99 Willie Blade DT (IR); 96 Ebenezer Ekuban DE (IR); 23 Dwayne Goodrich CB (IR); 58 Louis Mackey LB (IR); 77 Solomon Page T (IR); 6 Tim Seder K (IR); 64 Daleroy Stewart DT (NF-Inj); 44 Robert Thomas FB (IR); 91 Dimitrius Underwood DT (NF-Ill); 82 James Whalen TE (IR); 2 Anthony Wright QB (IR); 18 Bashir Yamini WR (IR); Practice squad: 19 Richmond Flowers WR; 15 Anthony Lucas WR (IR); 36 Tony Taylor RB; 67 Colston Weatherington DE; -- Austin Wheatley TE; 58 Donny Green OLB; 53 Scott Zimmerman LB; rookies in italics 53 active, 13 inactive, 5 practice squad

== Coaching staff ==
Dallas Cowboys 2001 coaching staff
Front office: Owner/general manager – Jerry Jones; Executive vp – Stephen Jones; === Head coaches === : Head coach – Dave Campo; === Offensive coaches === : Offensive coordinator – Jack Reilly; Quarterbacks – Wade Wilson; Running backs – Clarence Shelmon; Wide receivers – Wes Chandler; Tight ends – Joe Avezzano; Offensive line – Hudson Houck; Offensive assistant – Glenn Smith	Defensive coaches: Defensive coordinator – Mike Zimmer; Defensive tackle – Andre Patterson; Defensive ends – Jim Jeffcoat; Linebackers – George Edwards; Secondary – Pete Carmichael Jr; Defensive nickel – Bill Bates; === Special teams coaches === : Special teams – Joe Avezzano; Kickers – Steve Hoffman; Strength and conditioning – Joe Juraszek; Source:

== Preseason ==
Week	Date	Opponent	Result	Record	Venue
1	August 4	at Oakland Raiders	L 14–21	0–1	Network Associates Coliseum
2	August 11	Denver Broncos	L 6–20	0–2	Texas Stadium
3	August 18	at New Orleans Saints	L 10–16	0–3	Louisiana Superdome
4	August 27	vs. Oakland Raiders	W 21–6	1–3	Estadio Azteca (Mexico City)
5	August 30	Jacksonville Jaguars	W 27–17	2–3	Texas Stadium

== Regular season ==
Despite what seemed a promising outing in the first pre-season game by starter Tony Banks, the Cowboys, in a very surprising move, released Banks in the middle of training camp and handed the reins over to their rookie quarterback Quincy Carter. Banks would play this season with one of their rivals, the Washington Redskins. Unfortunately, a combination of injuries and ineffectiveness led the Cowboys to start a total of four different quarterbacks over the course of the season, including journeyman Anthony Wright and former Arkansas Razorback Clint Stoerner. In an attempt to provide more depth at the quarterback position, the team signed former second-overall draft pick Ryan Leaf mid-season, but he provided no improvement in his limited playing time. His only three starts of the season, a Week 9 loss to the Falcons, which also marked the first start for Falcons QB Michael Vick, a week 10 loss the Eagles, and a week 11 Thanksgiving Day loss to the Broncos, were the final starts of his career. Of those four quarterbacks, only Anthony Wright lasted into 2007.

Even with the injection of new blood, the Cowboys suffered through another 5–11 campaign. placing 5th and last in the NFC East. The lack of development at quarterback and the offense in general would be blamed on offensive coordinator Jack Reilly, who was dismissed after the season. Fans became weary of the Cowboys' performance and blamed owner Jerry Jones, who by now had taken a more hands-on approach to running the team.

One notable game included week 7, where the Cowboys led the Giants 24–7 at halftime, but (thanks in part to Clint Stoerner's 4 interceptions) the Giants rallied to win in overtime. In an unusual move, Stoerner was pulled from the game for Ryan Leaf late in the 4th quarter of a tie game. It was Leaf's debut with the team, but he couldn't lead them to victory.

Another infamous game was on Thanksgiving Day against the Broncos. Dallas trailed 26–10 and scored a touchdown in the 4th quarter. Coach Dave Campo decided against "going for 2" which if successful would have made it an eight-point (and one-possession) game. Campo instead had Dallas kick the extra point, keeping the margin at 9. Dallas did score one more late TD but that was not enough to tie the game and they never got the ball back, and lost 26–24.

A fourth consecutive season sweep of rival Washington Redskins and a victory over the San Francisco 49ers were the only victories of note. Much of the focus turned towards Emmitt Smith and his pursuit of the all-time career rushing yardage record. During an early-season game against the San Diego Chargers, Bob Hayes was inducted into the Cowboys Ring of Honor.

=== Schedule ===
Week	Date	Opponent	Result	Record	Venue	Attendance
1	September 9	Tampa Bay Buccaneers	**L** 6–10	0–1	Texas Stadium	61,521
2 (Note: The Cowboys were originally scheduled to play the Detroit Lions during Week 2 of the original NFL schedule (September 16) at Pontiac Silverdome in Pontiac. However, due to the September 11 attacks, the game was rescheduled to Week 17.)	September 23	San Diego Chargers	**L** 21–32	0–2	Texas Stadium	63,430
3	September 30	at **Philadelphia Eagles**	**L** 18–40	0–3	Veterans Stadium	66,621
4 (Note: The Cowboys were originally scheduled to play the Oakland Raiders during Week 6 (October 21) at Network Associates Coliseum in Oakland. However, the game was re-scheduled to Week 4 to accommodate a possible Oakland Athletics baseball game in the ALCS, in which both the Cowboys and Raiders would originally have had their byes. The Athletics were subsequently eliminated on October 15.)	October 7	at Oakland Raiders	**L** 21–28	0–4	Network Associates Coliseum	61,535
5	October 15	**Washington Redskins**	**W** 9–7	1–4	Texas Stadium	63,941
6	Bye					
7	October 28	**Arizona Cardinals**	**W** 17–3	2–4	Texas Stadium	63,114
8	November 4	at **New York Giants**	**L** 24–27 (OT)	2–5	Giants Stadium	78,673
9	November 11	at Atlanta Falcons	**L** 13–20	2–6	Georgia Dome	69,010
10	November 18	**Philadelphia Eagles**	**L** 3–36	2–7	Texas Stadium	63,204
11	November 22	Denver Broncos	**L** 24–26	2–8	Texas Stadium	64,104
12	December 2	at **Washington Redskins**	**W** 20–14	3–8	FedExField	85,112
13	December 9	**New York Giants**	**W** 20–13	4–8	Texas Stadium	61,821
14	December 16	at Seattle Seahawks	**L** 3–29	4–9	Husky Stadium	63,366
15	December 23	at **Arizona Cardinals**	**L** 10–17	4–10	Sun Devil Stadium	48,883
16	December 30	San Francisco 49ers	**W** 27–21	5–10	Texas Stadium	64,366
17	January 6	at Detroit Lions	**L** 10–15	5–11	Pontiac Silverdome	77,512

Note: Intra-division opponents are in bold text.

=== Game summaries ===
==== Week 2: vs San Diego Chargers ====
Week 2: San Diego Chargers at Dallas Cowboys – Game summary

Quarter	1	2	3	4	Total
**Chargers**	14	6	6	6	**32**
Cowboys	0	14	0	7	**21**

at Texas Stadium, Irving, Texas

- Date: September 23
- Game time: 12:00 p.m. CDT
- Game weather: Partly Cloudy and Hazy, 84 °F (29 °C)
- Game attendance: 63,430
- Referee: Jeff Triplette
- TV announcers (CBS): Kevin Harlan, Craig James and Beasley Reece
- Box score, Game Book

Game information

**First quarter**

- SDG – Freddie Jones 11-yard pass from Doug Flutie (Wade Richey kick), 10:23. Chargers 7–0. **Drive: 9 plays, 38 yards, 3:48.**
- SDG – Curtis Conway 7-yard pass from Doug Flutie (Wade Richey kick), 3:43. Chargers 14–0. **Drive: 10 plays, 48 yards, 5:39.**

**Second quarter**

- SDG – Wade Richey 22-yard field goal, 13:30. Chargers 17–0. **Drive: 5 plays, 39 yards, 1:42.**
- DAL – Rocket Ismail 80-yard pass from Anthony Wright (Tim Seder kick), 13:12. Chargers 17–7. **Drive: 1 play, 80 yards, 0:18.**
- SDG – Wade Richey 24-yard field goal, 3:55. Chargers 20–7. **Drive: 7 plays, 85 yards, 3:03.**
- DAL – Wane McGarity 11-yard pass from Anthony Wright (Tim Seder kick), 1:01. Chargers 20–14. **Drive: 7 plays, 70 yards, 2:54.**

**Third quarter**

- SDG – Tim Dwight 16-yard run (pass failed), 6:55. Chargers 26–14. **Drive: 10 plays, 83 yards, 5:45.**

**Fourth quarter**

- SDG – Wade Richey 23-yard field goal, 12:53. Chargers 29–14. **Drive: 11 plays, 81 yards, 5:00.**
- DAL – Mike Lucky 7-yard pass from Anthony Wright (Tim Seder kick), 9:21. Chargers 29–21. **Drive: 7 plays, 77 yards, 3:32.**
- SDG – Wade Richey 43-yard field goal, 1:09. Chargers 32–21. **Drive: 7 plays, 9 yards, 1:26.**

**Top passers**

- SDG – Doug Flutie – 23/38, 348 yards, 2 TD
- DAL – Anthony Wright – 12/25, 193 yards, 3 TD, 3 INT

**Top rushers**

- SDG – LaDainian Tomlinson – 27 rushes, 90 yards
- DAL – Emmitt Smith – 17 rushes, 85 yards

**Top receivers**

- SDG – Jeff Graham – 6 receptions, 94 yards
- DAL – Rocket Ismail – 2 receptions, 83 yards, TD

==== Week 8: at New York Giants ====
Week 8: Dallas Cowboys at New York Giants – game summary

Quarter	1	2	3	4	OT	Total
Cowboys	10	14	0	0	0	**24**
**Giants**	0	7	7	10	3	**27**

at Giants Stadium, East Rutherford, New Jersey

- Date: November 4
- Game time: 1:00 p.m. EST
- Game weather: Scattered clouds, 61 °F (16 °C)
- Game attendance: 78,673
- Referee: Bernie Kukar
- TV announcers (Fox): Dick Stockton, Troy Aikman, Daryl Johnston and Pam Oliver

Game information

**First quarter**

- DAL – Tim Seder 22-yard field goal, 3:15. Cowboys 3–0. **Drive: 9 plays, 65 yards, 5:49.**
- DAL – Joey Galloway 16-yard pass from Clint Stoerner (Tim Seder kick), 0:19. Cowboys 10–0. **Drive: 2 plays, 15 yards, 0:47.**

**Second quarter**

- DAL – Dexter Coakley 29-yard interception return (Tim Seder kick), 14:32. Cowboys 17–0.
- NYG – Joe Jurevicius 4-yard pass from Kerry Collins (Morten Andersen kick), 3:22. Cowboys 17–7. **Drive: 4 plays, 63 yards, 1:49.**
- DAL – Mario Edwards 71-yard interception return (Tim Seder kick), 0:39. Cowboys 24–7.

**Third quarter**

- NYG – Joe Jurevicius 34-yard pass from Kerry Collins (Morten Andersen kick), 5:45. Cowboys 24–14. **Drive: 6 plays, 80 yards, 2:57.**

**Fourth quarter**

- NYG – Morten Andersen 40-yard field goal, 10:41. Cowboys 24–17. **Drive: 7 plays, 28 yards, 4:06.**
- NYG – Ike Hilliard 9-yard pass from Kerry Collins (Morten Andersen kick), 8:19. Tied 24–24. **Drive: 2 plays, 14 yards, 0:46.**

**Overtime**

- NYG – Morten Andersen 42-yard field goal, 7:48. Giants 27–24. **Drive: 8 plays, 61 yards, 4:17.**

**Top passers**

- DAL – Clint Stoerner – 13/23, 177 yards, TD, 4 INT
- NYG – Kerry Collins – 24/34, 280 yards, 3 TD, 2 INT

**Top rushers**

- DAL – Troy Hambrick – 30 rushes, 77 yards
- NYG – Ron Dayne – 17 rushes, 52 yards

**Top receivers**

- DAL – Raghib Ismail – 6 receptions, 107 yards
- NYG – Amani Toomer – 3 receptions, 69 yards

==== Week 11: vs Denver Broncos ====
Week 11: Denver Broncos at Dallas Cowboys

Quarter	1	2	3	4	Total
**Broncos**	3	14	6	3	**26**
Cowboys	3	0	0	21	**24**

at Texas Stadium, Irving, Texas

- Date: November 22, 2001
- Game time: 3:15 p.m. CST
- Game weather: Overcast, 72 °F (22 °C)
- Game attendance: 64,104
- TV announcers (CBS): Greg Gumbel, Phil Simms and Armen Keteyian

Game information

**First quarter**

**Second quarter**

**Third quarter**

**Fourth quarter**

Top passers

- DEN – Brian Griese – 17/29, 171 yards, TD, INT
- DAL – Ryan Leaf – 16/32, 193 yards

Top rushers

- DEN – Mike Anderson – 33 rushes, 118 yards, TD
- DAL – Troy Hambrick – 5 rushes, 17 yards

Top receivers

- DEN – Rod Smith – 7 receptions, 81 yards
- DAL – Joey Galloway – 6 receptions, 64 yards

==== Week 17: at Detroit Lions ====
Week 17: Dallas Cowboys at Detroit Lions

Quarter	1	2	3	4	Total
Cowboys	0	7	0	3	**10**
**Lions**	0	6	3	6	**15**

at Pontiac Silverdome, Pontiac, Michigan

- Date: January 6, 2002
- Game time: 12:00 p.m. CDT/1:00 p.m. EST
- Game weather: None (indoor stadium)
- Game attendance: 77,512
- TV announcers (Fox): Kenny Albert, Tim Green and Jennifer Hammond

Game information

**First quarter**

**Second quarter**

**Third quarter**

**Fourth quarter**

Top passers

- DAL – Quincy Carter – 11/26, 158 yards, INT
- DET – Ty Detmer – 24/40, 242 yards, 2 TD

Top rushers

- DAL – Emmitt Smith – 18 rushes, 77 yards, TD
- DET – James Stewart – 13 rushes, 69 yards

Top receivers

- DAL – Joey Galloway – 3 receptions, 58 yards
- DET – Johnnie Morton – 8 receptions, 86 yards, TD

=== Standings ===
NFC East
	W	L	T	PCT	PF	PA	STK
^{(3)} Philadelphia Eagles	11	5	0	.688	343	208	W2
Washington Redskins	8	8	0	.500	256	303	W2
New York Giants	7	9	0	.438	294	321	L2
Arizona Cardinals	7	9	0	.438	295	343	L1
Dallas Cowboys	5	11	0	.313	246	338	L1

== Publications ==
- The Football Encyclopedia ISBN 0-312-11435-4
- Total Football ISBN 0-06-270170-3
- Cowboys Have Always Been My Heroes ISBN 0-446-51950-2
