= Tony Dixon (American football) =

American football player (born 1979)

No. 24
- Position: Safety

Personal information
- Born: June 18, 1979 (age 47); Tuscaloosa, Alabama, U.S.
- Listed height: 6 ft 1 in (1.85 m)
- Listed weight: 210 lb (95 kg)

Career information
- High school: Reform (AL) Pickens Co.
- College: Alabama
- NFL draft: 2001: 2nd round, 56th overall pick

Career history
- Dallas Cowboys (2001–2004); Washington Redskins (2005)*; Dallas Cowboys (2005)
- * Offseason or practice squad member only

Career NFL statistics
- Games played: 56
- Tackles: 126
- Interceptions: 1
- Sacks: 6
- Stats at Pro Football Reference

Tony Dixon (born June 18, 1979) is an American former professional football player who was a safety for the Dallas Cowboys of the National Football League (NFL). He played college football for the Alabama Crimson Tide and was selected by the Cowboys in the second round of the 2001 NFL draft.

== Early life ==
Dixon attended Pickens County High School, where he was a two-way football player (running back and defensive back). He was a four-year starter and earned All-State honors two years in a row.

As a junior he registered 1,286 rushing yards, 17 touchdowns, 115 tackles and 6 interceptions (3 returned for touchdowns). As a senior, he posted 1,450 rushing yards, 18 rushing touchdowns, 2 touchdown passes, one receiving touchdown, 6 sacks, 4 interceptions and 2 fumble recoveries.

== College career ==
Dixon accepted a football scholarship from the University of Alabama. As a true freshman, he collected 22 tackles (2 for loss) and one sack, earning his first career start at free safety against the University of Tennessee. He had 6 tackles against Auburn University.

As a sophomore, he became a regular starter at strong safety, tallying 75 tackles (third on the team), 2 tackles for loss, one interception and one pass defensed. He had 11 tackles against Louisiana State University. He made 14 tackles against Mississippi State University.

As a junior, he split time between strong and free safety. He posted 65 tackles (second on the team), 2 tackles for loss, 4 passes defensed and one forced fumble. He had 13 tackles against the University of Florida.

As a senior, he started at free safety, finishing with 90 tackles (third on the team), one sack, 2 interceptions, 6 passes defensed and one forced fumble. He had 10 tackles, one interception and one pass defensed against the University of Mississippi. He made 17 tackles against the University of Tennessee. He made 11 tackles against Auburn University.

== Professional career ==
Pre-draft measurables
Height	Weight	Arm length	Hand span	40-yard dash	10-yard split	20-yard split	Three-cone drill	Vertical jump	Broad jump	Bench press
6 ft 1 1/8 in (1.86 m)	213 lb (97 kg)	31 1/2 in (0.80 m)	10 1/4 in (0.26 m)	4.61 s	1.59 s	2.68 s	7.38 s	37.0 in (0.94 m)	9 ft 9 in (2.97 m)	17 reps
All values from NFL Combine

=== Dallas Cowboys (first stint) ===
The Dallas Cowboys traded down in the second round of the 2001 NFL draft, sending to the Miami Dolphins the 52nd overall selection (Chris Chambers), in exchange for the 56th (used to select Dixon) and the 122nd (Markus Steele). As a rookie, he played on the nickel defense.

In his second season, he started the last six games at strong safety, after Darren Woodson suffered a season-ending groin injury, making 49 tackles, 2 sacks, 4 quarterback pressures, 2 passes defensed, one interception and 16 special teams (third on the team).

In 2003, he was a special teams standout, leading the team with 20 tackles.

In 2004, after Woodson missed the season due to a herniated disc, he split time with Lynn Scott at strong safety, registering seven starts and finding a niche as a blitzer, tying for fifth in the NFL among defensive backs with 3 sacks. He wasn't re-signed after the season and finished his Cowboys career with 90 tackles (56 solo), 6 sacks, 10 passes defensed, 49 special teams tackles and one interception.

=== Washington Redskins ===
On June 18, 2005, signed a one-year contract as a free agent with the Washington Redskins. He was released before the start of the season on August 23.

=== Dallas Cowboys (second stint) ===
On November 1, 2005, he was signed by the Dallas Cowboys to help improve the secondary depth. On November 9, he was cut to make room for linebacker Quinton Caver. He was brought back for depth purposes on December 26. He wasn't re-signed at the end of the season.

== NFL career statistics ==
Legend
**Bold**	Career high

=== Regular season ===
Year	Team	Games		Tackles					Interceptions					Fumbles			
Year	Team	GP	GS	Cmb	Solo	Ast	Sck	TFL	Int	Yds	TD	Lng	PD	FF	FR	Yds	TD
2001	DAL	8	0	11	9	2	1.0	1	0	0	0	0	0	0	0	0	0
2002	DAL	**16**	**8**	50	40	**10**	2.0	1	**1**	0	0	0	2	0	0	0	0
2003	DAL	**16**	0	14	12	2	0.0	0	0	0	0	0	2	0	0	0	0
2004	DAL	**16**	7	**51**	**46**	5	**3.0**	**3**	0	0	0	0	**4**	**2**	0	0	0
		56	15	126	107	19	6.0	5	1	0	0	0	8	2	0	0	0

=== Playoffs ===
Year	Team	Games		Tackles					Interceptions					Fumbles			
Year	Team	GP	GS	Cmb	Solo	Ast	Sck	TFL	Int	Yds	TD	Lng	PD	FF	FR	Yds	TD
2003	DAL	**1**	0	**2**	**2**	0	0.0	0	0	0	0	0	0	0	0	0	0
		1	0	2	2	0	0.0	0	0	0	0	0	0	0	0	0	0
