= 2004 Dallas Cowboys season =

NFL team season

- Owner: Jerry Jones
- General manager: Jerry Jones
- Head coach: Bill Parcells
- Home stadium: Texas Stadium

Results
- Record: 6–10
- Division place: 3rd NFC East
- Playoffs: Did not qualify
- Pro Bowlers: 5: OT Flozell Adams; G Larry Allen; DT La'Roi Glover; S Roy Williams; TE Jason Witten

Uniform
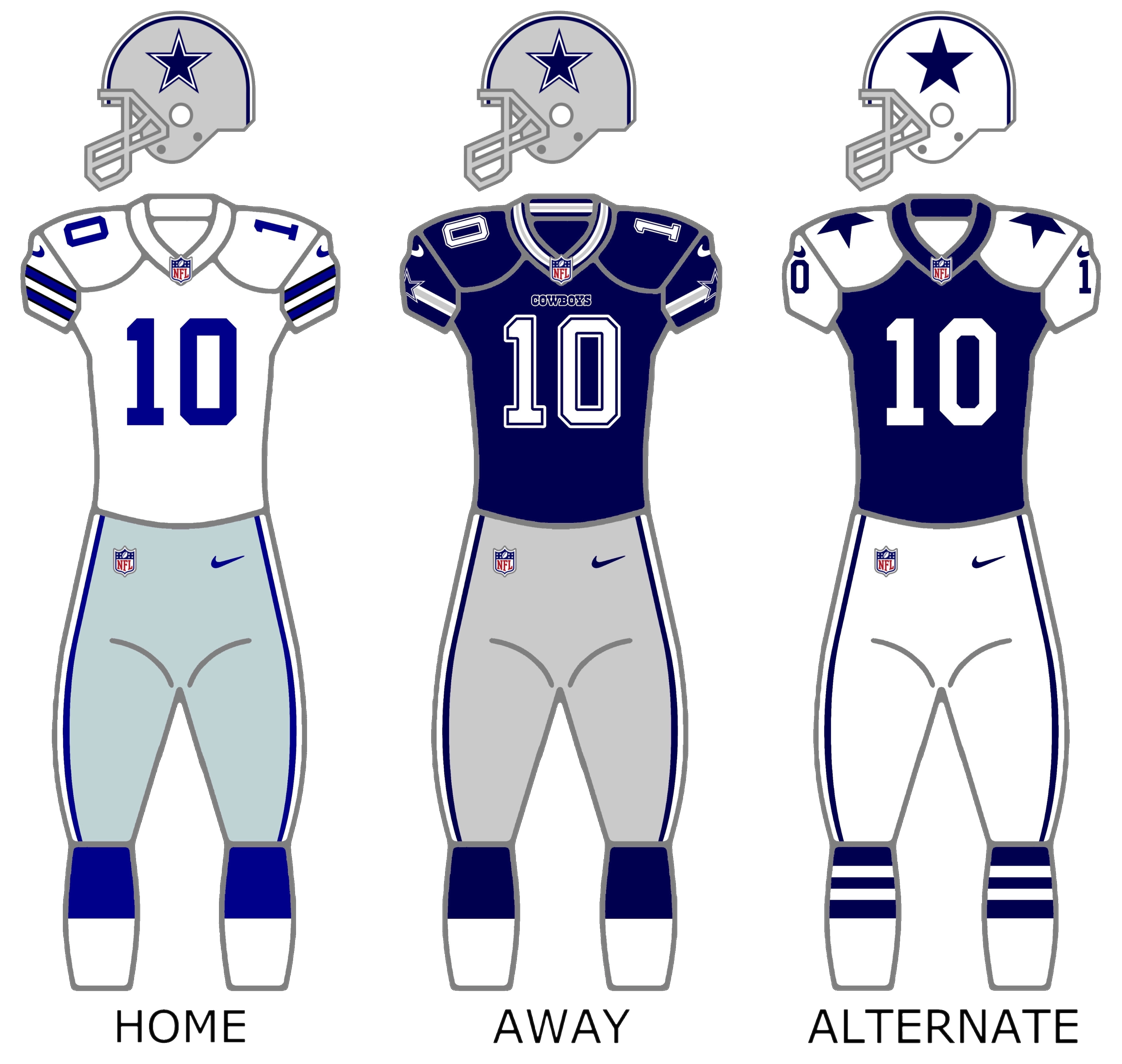

The 2004 season was the Dallas Cowboys' 45th in the National Football League (NFL), their 16th under the ownership of Jerry Jones, their 33rd playing their home games at Texas Stadium, and their second season under head coach Bill Parcells. The team failed to improve on their 10–6 record in 2003 and finished at 6–10, failing to make the playoffs for the fourth time since 1999.

== Offseason ==
Before the season began, the Cowboys faced were forced to adjust. Coming off their first winning season for the first time in five years, the team, under Bill Parcells' direction, continued to bring in veteran talent and draft promising prospects. In the offseason, the Cowboys signed quarterback Vinny Testaverde and traded for wide receiver Keyshawn Johnson. Both Testaverde and Johnson had played for Parcells when he had coached the New York Jets. In return for Johnson, the Buccaneers received Joey Galloway. The draft saw the arrival of running back Julius Jones, cornerbacks Jacques Reeves and Nate Jones, and college quarterback turned wide receiver Patrick Crayton. In owner Jerry Jones' continuing quest to acquire quarterback talent, the Cowboys traded for the rights to Drew Henson, another baseball player attempting to return to football. Henson starred at Michigan, keeping future NFL quarterback Tom Brady from claiming the starting job outright. His struggles in the New York Yankees farm system led him to reconsider his career and opt for a return to football, similar to Chad Hutchinson, whom the team had acquired two years prior. Hutchinson was later released.

== Quarterback controversy ==
With the opening of training camp, the team seemed poised to take the next step; however, this soon changed. Within the first week of camp, the Cowboys released starting quarterback Quincy Carter. The move came with no warning; reporters at training camp became aware something had occurred when Carter did not suit up for practice and was later seen being escorted from the Cowboys facility. Though never verified by Carter or the team, it has been speculated by the Cowboys, that his release was prompted by a failed drug test administered by the Cowboys, an action prohibited by NFL rules. Rumors began that Carter had already entered the second phase of the NFL's substance abuse program, meaning he had twice failed NFL-mandated random drug screenings.

Test results are not made public but notices are sent to team officials. A third violation of the substance abuse program results in a mandatory suspension, and the Cowboys, unwilling to risk losing a starting quarterback during the season, began to monitor Carter with its own drug tests. Carter's formal protest of his release through the NFLPA as well as his subsequent troubles with drug addiction appear to lend credence to this scenario, According to the NFLPA. This move had a long-term effect on the team: Had Carter remained, second-year QB Tony Romo would have been fourth on the depth chart and likely cut from the team. When Carter left, Romo moved up to number 3, and was later a Pro Bowl starting quarterback for the Cowboys.

== Regular season ==
Vinny Testaverde would be the opening day starter for the Cowboys. His extensive experience and veteran presence was an asset to the team, especially to young undrafted practice squad addition Tony Romo, but failed to produce many points behind an inconsistent offensive line. Dallas' defense would also regress from the previous season, especially the secondary which lost starting cornerback Mario Edwards in free agency and longtime mainstay and team leader safety Darren Woodson due to injury. Following a loss to the Baltimore Ravens, Drew Henson would start the annual Thanksgiving Day game against the Chicago Bears.

The game still provided excitement for Cowboys fans as a rookie running back Julius Jones, who had been injured early in the season and had just returned in the previous game, put on a masterful performance rushing for 150 yards and two touchdowns in leading the team to victory. Jones' momentum would carry over to the next game where he would rush for 198 yards and three scores in a dramatic win over the Seattle Seahawks. In only 7 starts (8 games overall) Jones would rush for over 800 yards and seven touchdowns, though not justifying Parcells' decision to pass on running backs Steven Jackson and Kevin Jones in the draft.

Bill Parcells would continue to mold the team steadily implementing his preferred 3–4 defense and allowing his assistant coaches on offense, particularly Maurice Carthon and Sean Payton, to take more control. Other notable additions to the team this year include linebackers Ryan Fowler and Scott Shanle as well as former Heisman Trophy winner Eddie George in his final NFL season.

== 2004 draft class ==
2004 Dallas Cowboys draft
Round	Pick	Player	Position	College	Notes
2	43	Julius Jones	RB	Notre Dame	
2	52	Jacob Rogers	OT	Southern California	
3	83	Stephen Peterman	G	LSU	
4	121	Bruce Thornton	CB	Georgia	
5	144	Sean Ryan	TE	Boston College	
7	205	Nathan Jones	CB	Rutgers	
7	216	Patrick Crayton	WR	Northwestern Oklahoma State	
7	223	Jacques Reeves	CB	Purdue	
Made roster † Pro Football Hall of Fame * Made at least one Pro Bowl during career

Notes

- The Cowboys traded their first-round (No. 22 overall) selection to the Buffalo Bills in exchange for second (No. 43 overall) and fifth-round (No. 144 overall) selections, and a 2005 first-round (No. 20 overall) selection.
- The Cowboys traded their original fifth-round (No. 156 overall) selection to the New Orleans Saints in exchange for sixth (No. 182 overall) and seventh-round (No. 206 overall) selections.
- The Cowboys traded their original seventh-round (No. 223 overall) selection and a 2005 sixth-round (No. 185 overall) selection to the Oakland Raiders for defensive tackle Kenyon Coleman.
- The Cowboys traded their sixth-round (No. 182 overall, from New Orleans) selection to the Oakland Raiders in exchange for two seventh-round (Nos. 205 and 223 overall) selections.
- The Cowboys traded their original sixth-round (No. 188 overall) selection to the Green Bay Packers for wide receiver Terry Glenn.
- The Cowboys traded their seventh-round (No. 206 overall, from New Orleans) selection to the Tampa Bay Buccaneers for fullback Darian Barnes and a seventh-round (No. 216 overall) selection.

== Schedule ==
Week	Date	Opponent	Result	Record	Venue	Recap
1	September 12	at Minnesota Vikings	L 17–35	0–1	Hubert H. Humphrey Metrodome	Recap
2	September 19	Cleveland Browns	W 19–12	1–1	Texas Stadium	Recap
3	September 27	at Washington Redskins	W 21–18	2–1	FedExField	Recap
4	Bye					
5	October 10	New York Giants	L 10–26	2–2	Texas Stadium	Recap
6	October 17	Pittsburgh Steelers	L 20–24	2–3	Texas Stadium	Recap
7	October 24	at Green Bay Packers	L 20–41	2–4	Lambeau Field	Recap
8	October 31	Detroit Lions	W 31–21	3–4	Texas Stadium	Recap
9	November 7	at Cincinnati Bengals	L 3–26	3–5	Paul Brown Stadium	Recap
10	November 15	Philadelphia Eagles	L 21–49	3–6	Texas Stadium	Recap
11	November 21	at Baltimore Ravens	L 10–30	3–7	M&T Bank Stadium	Recap
12	November 25	Chicago Bears	W 21–7	4–7	Texas Stadium	Recap
13	December 6	at Seattle Seahawks	W 43–39	5–7	Qwest Field	Recap
14	December 12	New Orleans Saints	L 13–27	5–8	Texas Stadium	Recap
15	December 19	at Philadelphia Eagles	L 7–12	5–9	Lincoln Financial Field	Recap
16	December 26	Washington Redskins	W 13–10	6–9	Texas Stadium	Recap
17	January 2	at New York Giants	L 24–28	6–10	Giants Stadium	Recap

=== Game summaries ===
==== Week One at Minnesota Vikings ====
The Cowboys season got off on the wrong foot in a 35-17 loss at The Metrodome. Daunte Culpepper erupted to five touchdown throws while Randy Moss caught two of them and threw a 37-yard pass. Vinny Testaverde had a touchdown to Terry Glenn but little else despite 355 yards.

==== Week Two vs. Cleveland Browns ====
Dallas rebounded by grinding out a 19-12 win over the Browns. Ex-Niner Jeff Garcia completed for just 71 yards, threw three interceptions (matching three picks by ex-Brown Testsverde), and down 17-12 gave up a safety with nine seconds to go.

==== Week Three at Washington Redskins ====
On Monday Night Football Joe Gibbs hosted the Cowboys in his first season returning as Redskins coach. The Cowboys scored three touchdowns on catches by Jason Witten and Terry Glenn and a one-yard score by Eddie George. Ex-Jaguars starter Mark Brunell had two touchdowns but his 46-yard completion on the final play was insufficient in a 21-18 Cowboys win.

==== Week Five vs. New York Giants ====
Ex-Jaguars coach (and ex-Giants assistant coach under Cowboys coach Bill Parcells) Tom Coughlin and ex-Rams Super Bowl champ Kurt Warner led the Giants to a 26-10 win at Texas Stadium. The Giants scored the final 23 points of the game while intercepting Testaverde once.

==== Week Six vs. Pittsburgh Steelers ====
The Steelers had switched quarterbacks after a Week Two loss to the Ravens and rookie Ben Roethlisberger had won three straight going into Week Six. The lead tied or changed three times in the first half before the Cowboys broke a 10-10 tie in the third quarter on a Billy Cundiff field goal and a 22-yard Testaverde touchdown to Keyshawn Johnson. But Roethlisberger rushed for nine yards and completed seven straight passes; his touchdown to Jerame Tuman put the score 20-17; after an exchange of punts Testaverde was sacked and lost the football with a personal foul penalty on Johnson putting the Steelers possession at the Dallas 24; Jerome Bettis finished the ensuing drive on a 1-yard score and 24-20 Pittsburgh win.

==== Week Seven at Green Bay Packers ====
The Cowboys led 6-3 after the first quarter but after that the Packers outscored Dallas 38-14 led by three Brett Favre touchdowns.

==== Week Eight vs. Detroit Lions ====
Dallas rebounded with a 31-21 win over the Lions. Vinny Testaverde overcame three interceptions (one a pick six by Dre Bly) with three touchdown throws and a rushing score. Eddie George hit 99 yards, his highest with the Cowboys.

==== Week Nine at Cincinnati Bengals ====
Testaverde threw three more interceptions amid five total turnovers as the Cowboys were routed 26-3. Matt Schobel caught a 76-yard touchdown from Carson Palmer.

==== Week 10 Monday Night Football vs. Philadelphia Eagles ====
Andy Reid reached 8-1 on Monday Night Football in a 49-21 runaway at Texas Stadium. Terrell Owens caught a 59-yard touchdown then on the sidelines he and Donovan McNabb spoofed their sideline argument in a 27–3 loss to the Steelers the week earlier. McNabb had four total touchdowns and a spectacular 60-yard completion to Freddie Mitchell in which he raced sideline to sideline them unleashed the pass on the run. Eddie George committed a fumble and Testaverde was intercepted once.

== Standings ==
NFC East
	W	L	T	PCT	DIV	CONF	PF	PA	STK
^{(1)} Philadelphia Eagles	13	3	0	.813	6–0	11–1	386	260	L2
New York Giants	6	10	0	.375	3–3	5–7	303	347	W1
Dallas Cowboys	6	10	0	.375	2–4	5–7	293	405	L1
Washington Redskins	6	10	0	.375	1–5	6–6	240	265	W1

NFC
#	Team	Division	W	L	T	PCT	DIV	CONF	SOS	SOV	STK
Division leaders
1	Philadelphia Eagles	East	13	3	0	.813	6–0	11–1	.453	.409	L2
2	Atlanta Falcons	South	11	5	0	.688	4–2	8–4	.420	.432	L2
3	Green Bay Packers	North	10	6	0	.625	5–1	9–3	.457	.419	W2
4	Seattle Seahawks	West	9	7	0	.563	3–3	8–4	.445	.368	W2
Wild cards
5 (Note: St. Louis clinched the NFC #5 seed instead of Minnesota or New Orleans based on better conference record (7–5 to Minnesota’s 5–7 to New Orleans’ 6–6).)	St. Louis Rams	West	8	8	0	.500	5–1	7–5	.488	.438	W2
6 (Note: Minnesota clinched the NFC #6 seed instead of New Orleans based on head-to-head victory.)	Minnesota Vikings	North	8	8	0	.500	3–3	5–7	.480	.406	L2
Did not qualify for the postseason
7	New Orleans Saints	South	8	8	0	.500	3–3	6–6	.465	.427	W4
8	Carolina Panthers	South	7	9	0	.438	3–3	6–6	.496	.366	L1
9 (Note: Detroit finished ahead of Arizona and New York Giants based upon head-to-head record (2–0 versus Arizona’s 1–1 and New York Giants’ 0–2). Division tiebreak was initially used to eliminate Dallas and Washington.)	Detroit Lions	North	6	10	0	.375	2–4	5–7	.496	.417	L2
10	Arizona Cardinals	West	6	10	0	.375	2–4	5–7	.461	.417	W1
11 (Note: New York Giants finished ahead of Dallas and Washington in the NFC East based on better head-to-head record (3–1 to Dallas‘ 2–2 to Washington’s 1–3).)	New York Giants	East	6	10	0	.375	3–3	5–7	.516	.417	W1
12 (Note: Dallas finished ahead of Washington in the NFC East based on head-to-head sweep.)	Dallas Cowboys	East	6	10	0	.375	2–4	5–7	.516	.375	L1
13	Washington Redskins	East	6	10	0	.375	1–5	6–6	.477	.333	W1
14 (Note: Tampa Bay finished ahead of Chicago based upon head-to-head victory.)	Tampa Bay Buccaneers	South	5	11	0	.313	2–4	4–8	.477	.413	L4
15	Chicago Bears	North	5	11	0	.313	2–4	4–8	.465	.388	L4
16	San Francisco 49ers	West	2	14	0	.125	2–4	2–10	.488	.375	L3
Tiebreakers (Note: When breaking ties for three or more teams under the NFL's rules, they are first broken within divisions, then comparing only the highest-ranked remaining team from each division.)

== Roster ==
Dallas Cowboys 2004 roster
Quarterbacks: 7 Drew Henson; 9 Tony Romo; 16 Vinny Testaverde; Running backs: 36 Darian Barnes FB; 27 Eddie George; 21 Julius Jones; 32 ReShard Lee KR; 39 Lousaka Polite FB; Wide receivers: 18 Terrance Copper KR; 84 Patrick Crayton PR; 15 Tom Crowder; 19 Keyshawn Johnson; 81 Quincy Morgan; 89 Randal Williams; Tight ends: 49 Brett Pierce; 80 Sean Ryan; 82 Jason Witten	Offensive linemen: 76 Flozell Adams OT; 73 Larry Allen G; 65 Andre Gurode G; 62 Al Johnson C; 60 Ben Noll G; 79 Jacob RogersOT; 77 Torrin Tucker OT; 78 Kurt Vollers OT; 71 Tyson Walter C; Defensive linemen: 91 Leonardo Carson DT; 95 DeVone Claybrooks DT; 93 Kenyon Coleman DE; 98 Greg Ellis DE; 97 La'Roi Glover DT; 99 Tron LaFavor DT; 90 Eric Ogbogu DE; 75 Marcellus Wiley DE	Linebackers: 52 Dexter Coakley OLB; 55 Ryan Fowler MLB; 56 Bradie James MLB; 59 Dat Nguyen MLB; 54 Keith O'Neil OLB; 58 Scott Shanle OLB; 53 Kalen Thornton OLB; Defensive backs: 43 Steve Cargile FS; 29 Keith Davis FS; 24 Tony Dixon SS; 30 Lance Frazier CB; 33 Nate Jones CB; 41 Terence Newman CB; 35 Jacques Reeves CB; 38 Lynn Scott SS; 31 Roy Williams FS; Special teams: 3 Billy Cundiff K; 1 Mat McBriar P; 85 Jeff Robinson LS	Reserve lists: 20 Richie Anderson FB (IR); 46 Erik Bickerstaff RB (IR); 86 Dan Campbell TE (IR); 63 Gennaro DiNapoli C (IR); 83 Terry Glenn WR (IR); 47 Pete Hunter CB (IR); 72 Stephen Peterman G (IR); 51 Al Singleton OLB (IR); 25 Bruce Thornton CB (IR); 28 Darren Woodson S (IR); Practice squad: 92 Jermaine Brooks DT; 26 Keylon Kincade RB; 40 Jeff Sanchez CB; 48 Landon Trusty TE; 23 Lenny Williams CB; 53 active, 10 inactive, 5 practice squad

== Publications ==
- The Football Encyclopedia ISBN 0-312-11435-4
- Total Football ISBN 0-06-270170-3
- Cowboys Have Always Been My Heroes ISBN 0-446-51950-2
