= Anthony Lucas =

Anthony Lucas may refer to:

- Anthony Francis Lucas (1855–1921), Croatian-born American oil explorer
- Anthony T. Lucas (1911–1986), Irish archaeologist, historian and museologist
- Anthony Lucas (wide receiver) (born 1976), American football wide receiver
- Anthony Lucas (defensive end) (born 2004), American football defensive end

== See also ==
- Antony J. Lucas, Greek Australian businessman
