= Lynn Scott =

American football player (born 1977)

No. 21, 38
- Position: Safety

Personal information
- Born: June 23, 1977 (age 49); Turpin, Oklahoma, U.S.
- Listed height: 6 ft 0 in (1.83 m)
- Listed weight: 211 lb (96 kg)

Career information
- High school: Turpin
- College: Northwestern Oklahoma State (1997–2000)
- NFL draft: 2001: undrafted

Career history
- Dallas Cowboys (2001–2005)

Awards and highlights
- NAIA national champion (1999); 3× NAIA All-American (1998, 1999, 2000); CSFL Defensive Player of the Year (2000); 4× All-CSFL (1997–2000)

Career NFL statistics
- Tackles: 83
- Interceptions: 1
- Passes defended: 7
- Stats at Pro Football Reference

Lynn Scott (born June 23, 1977) is an American former professional football player who was a safety for the Dallas Cowboys of the National Football League (NFL). He played college football for the Northwestern Oklahoma State Rangers.

== Early life ==
Scott attended Turpin High School, where he helped his team win the 1995 Class 1A state title. He accepted a football scholarship from Northwestern Oklahoma State University, where he was a three-time NAIA All-American and helped his team win the 1999 NAIA national championship. As a freshman, he was named a starter at safety, recording 90 tackles, 2 interceptions, while returning 17 punts for 208 yards (12.2-yard average).

As a sophomore, he registered 49 tackles, 2 interceptions, 4 passes defensed, while returning 12 punts for 337 yards (28.1-yard average) and 2 touchdowns. As a junior, he collected 87 tackles, 5 interceptions, 5 passes defensed, while returning 16 punts for 197 yards (12.3-yard average) and one touchdown.

As a senior, he posted 72 tackles, 4 interceptions, 9 passes defensed, while returning 26 punts for a school record 595 yards (22.9-yard average) and 4 touchdowns. He finished his college career with 298 tackles and the school record for most punt return yards in a season (595) and in a career (1,337).

In 2009, he was named NAIA Defensive Player of the Decade. In 2012, he was inducted into the Northwestern Oklahoma State Sports Hall of Fame.

== Professional career ==
Scott was signed as an undrafted free agent by the Dallas Cowboys after the 2001 NFL draft. He finished with 15 special teams tackles (third on the team), 5 defensive tackles and 2 fumble recoveries.

In 2002, he tallied 15 tackles, 2 passes defensed, one quarterback pressure and 8 special teams tackles. In 2003, he had 3 tackles, 1 pass defensed and 8 special teams tackles.

In 2004, he started 9 games at strong safety alongside Roy Williams, after Darren Woodson was lost for the season with a herniated disk in his lower back. He finished with 46 tackles, one sack, one interception, 3 passes defensed, one fumble recovered and 11 special teams tackles.

He was waived on September 3, 2005, but was later re-signed on November 1. He appeared in 6 games, making 3 special teams tackles. He wasn't re-signed at the end of the season.

== NFL career statistics ==
Legend
**Bold**	Career high

=== Regular season ===
Year	Team	Games		Tackles					Interceptions					Fumbles			
Year	Team	GP	GS	Cmb	Solo	Ast	Sck	TFL	Int	Yds	TD	Lng	PD	FF	FR	Yds	TD
2001	DAL	14	0	10	7	3	0.0	0	0	0	0	0	0	0	**2**	0	0
2002	DAL	14	0	14	9	5	0.0	0	0	0	0	0	**3**	0	0	0	0
2003	DAL	**16**	0	9	8	1	0.0	0	0	0	0	0	1	0	0	0	0
2004	DAL	**16**	**9**	**48**	**39**	**9**	**1.0**	**1**	**1**	**2**	0	**2**	**3**	0	1	**26**	0
2005	DAL	6	0	2	2	0	0.0	0	0	0	0	0	0	0	0	0	0
		66	9	83	65	18	1.0	1	1	2	0	2	7	0	3	26	0

=== Playoffs ===
Year	Team	Games		Tackles					Interceptions					Fumbles			
Year	Team	GP	GS	Cmb	Solo	Ast	Sck	TFL	Int	Yds	TD	Lng	PD	FF	FR	Yds	TD
2003	DAL	**1**	0	**1**	**1**	0	0.0	0	0	0	0	0	0	0	0	0	0
		1	0	1	1	0	0.0	0	0	0	0	0	0	0	0	0	0
