= Izell Reese =

American football player (born 1974)

No. 43
- Position: Safety

Personal information
- Born: May 7, 1974 (age 52); Dothan, Alabama, U.S.
- Listed height: 6 ft 2 in (1.88 m)
- Listed weight: 195 lb (88 kg)

Career information
- High school: Northview (Dothan, Alabama)
- College: UAB
- NFL draft: 1998: 6th round, 188th overall pick

Career history
- Dallas Cowboys (1998–2001); Denver Broncos (2002); Buffalo Bills (2003–2004); Dallas Cowboys (2005)*
- * Offseason or practice squad member only

Career NFL statistics
- Tackles: 245
- Interceptions: 8
- Forced fumbles: 3
- Stats at Pro Football Reference

Izell Reese (born May 7, 1974) is an American former professional football player who was a safety in the National Football League (NFL) for the Dallas Cowboys, Buffalo Bills, and Denver Broncos. He played college football for the UAB Blazers and was selected by the Cowboys in the sixth round of the 1998 NFL draft.

== Early life ==
Reese attended Northview High School, where he led the football team with five interceptions as a senior. He also lettered in basketball.

Although he came to the University of Alabama at Birmingham as a walk-on athlete, he was named the starter at strong safety as a freshman, making 10 tackles and leading the team with four interceptions. The next season, he registered 70 tackles and one interception and posted 18 tackles—the third best single-game total in school history—against Western Kentucky University.

As a junior, he recorded 69 tackles (second on the team), five tackles for loss and three sacks. In his last year, he collected 83 tackles (four for loss) and closed out his eligibility with a school-record 85-yard interception return for a touchdown against Arkansas State University.

During his time in college, the University of Alabama at Birmingham went from NCAA Division II to I-AA and on to Division I-A. He finished second in career tackles (276), first in solo tackles (188), fourth in career interceptions (eight), first in career interception return yardage (135 yards) and first with 44 games (38 starts out of 44).

== Professional career ==
Pre-draft measurables
| Height | Weight | Arm length | Hand span | 40-yard dash | 10-yard split | 20-yard split | 20-yard shuttle | Three-cone drill | Vertical jump | Broad jump | Bench press |
|---|---|---|---|---|---|---|---|---|---|---|---|
| 6 ft 2 1/8 in (1.88 m) | 193 lb (88 kg) | 32 3/4 in (0.83 m) | 9 3/4 in (0.25 m) | 4.54 s | 1.60 s | 2.66 s | 4.06 s | 7.09 s | 39.5 in (1.00 m) | 11 ft 1 in (3.38 m) | 13 reps |
All values from NFL Combine

=== Dallas Cowboys (first stint) ===
Reese was selected by the Dallas Cowboys in the sixth round (188th overall) of the 1998 NFL draft, becoming the second UAB player ever to be selected in the draft (after Dainon Sidney).

The coaches were intrigued by his size/speed ratio but decided to keep him at safety. Although he was not expected to make an impact, he contributed in the "45" and nickel packages, while also emerging as the team's leader in special teams tackles with 21. He was a key player in the Cowboys leading the NFL in kickoff coverage (18.5 yards) and finishing third in punt coverage (6.2 yards).

Despite missing the final eight games of the 1999 season with a herniated disc in his neck, he tied for second on the team with three interceptions and registered 28 tackles, five passes defensed, six special teams tackles and two quarterback pressures.

After overcoming a career-threatening neck injury in the 2000 season, he became a seven-game starter at free safety in place of an injured George Teague, finishing first on the team in special teams tackles (22), second in interceptions (two) and eighth in tackles (72).

In 2001, the team tried to convert him into a cornerback, but after starting the first four games, he was replaced with Duane Hawthorne at left cornerback and was moved back to safety. He registered 37 tackles (24 solo), three sacks (fourth on the team), three passes defensed, one interception and eight special teams tackles.

=== Denver Broncos ===
On March 15, 2002, he signed as a free agent with the Denver Broncos. He earned the starting free safety position, finishing with 58 tackles five quarterback pressures, one pass defensed and three special teams tackles.

=== Buffalo Bills ===
On March 21, 2003, he signed as a free agent with the Buffalo Bills. He started 9 out of 13 games at free safety before being placed on the injured reserve list on December 17. He collected 33 tackles, one quarterback pressure and six special teams tackles.

In 2004, he was named the starter at free safety until he was passed on the depth chart by rookie Rashad Baker in the 10th game and was declared inactive during the rest of the season. He posted 48 tackles, one interception and one quarterback pressure.

=== Dallas Cowboys (second stint) ===
On June 3, 2005, he was signed by the Dallas Cowboys to provide depth after the retirement of safety Darren Woodson. He was released on August 24.

== NFL statistics ==
| Year | Team | Games | | Tackles | | | | Fumbles | | | Interceptions | | | | | |
| Year | Team | G | GS | Comb | Total | Ast | Sack | FF | FR | Yds | Int | Yds | Avg | Lng | TD | PD |
|---|---|---|---|---|---|---|---|---|---|---|---|---|---|---|---|---|
| 1998 | DAL | 16 | 0 | 4 | 4 | 0 | 0.0 | 0 | 0 | 0 | 1 | 6 | 6 | | 0 | 0 | |
| 1999 | DAL | 8 | 4 | 22 | 17 | 5 | 0.0 | 0 | 0 | 0 | 3 | 28 | 9.3 | 24 | 0 | 4 |
| 2000 | DAL | 16 | 7 | 47 | 32 | 15 | 0.0 | 0 | 0 | 0 | 2 | 60 | 30 | 46 | 0 | 6 |
| 2001 | DAL | 16 | 4 | 29 | 27 | 02 | 3.0 | 3 | 0 | 0 | 1 | 42 | 42 | 42 | 0 | 3 |
| 2002 | DEN | 15 | 15 | 54 | 42 | 12 | 0.5 | 0 | 0 | 0 | 0 | 0 | 0 | 0 | 0 | 4 |
| 2003 | BUF | 13 | 9 | 34 | 24 | 10 | 0.0 | 0 | 0 | 0 | 0 | 0 | 0 | 0 | 0 | 1 |
| 2004 | BUF | 9 | 9 | 36 | 18 | 18 | 0.0 | 0 | 0 | 0 | 0 | 0 | 0 | 0 | 0 | 1 |
| Career | | 93 | 48 | 226 | 164 | 62 | 3.5 | 3 | 0 | 0 | 8 | 169 | 21.125 | 46 | 0 | 19 |

== Personal life ==
Reese retired in 2005 and is now the EVP of Next College Student Athlete and GM of the Rivals Combine Series, camps and combines for high school football players.

He is the co-founder of Rising Seniors, a program that gives top athletes in the Junior year of high school the opportunity to have a "rookie camp" experience and coaching on making the most of college opportunities and the recruiting process. The annual program ends with a "Junior Bowl" that gives college recruiters a glimpse of new talent.
