= Mike Lucky =

American football player (born 1975)

No. 84, 86
- Position: Tight end

Personal information
- Born: November 23, 1975 (age 50); Antioch, California, U.S.
- Listed height: 6 ft 6 in (1.98 m)
- Listed weight: 280 lb (127 kg)

Career information
- High school: Antioch
- College: Arizona
- NFL draft: 1999: 7th round, 229th overall pick

Career history
- Dallas Cowboys (1999–2002)

Awards and highlights
- Insight.com Bowl champion (1997)

Career NFL statistics
- Games played: 46
- Receptions: 19
- Receiving yards: 143
- Touchdowns: 1
- Stats at Pro Football Reference

Michael Thomas Lucky (born November 23, 1975) is an American former professional football player who was a tight end in the National Football League (NFL) for the Dallas Cowboys. He played college football for the Arizona Wildcats.

== Early life ==
Lucky was born in Antioch, California, where he played in Antioch Youth Football. He attended Antioch High School. As a junior, he tallied 17 receptions for 350 yards and 5 touchdowns, while receiving second-team All-Bay Valley Athletic honors.

As a senior, he served as team captain and recorded 36 receptions for 650 yards and 11 touchdowns, while receiving All-Bay Valley Athletic honors at tight end and defensive tackle. He also earned All-Northern California and All-state honors. He left high school rated as the 15th best tight end in the country by SuperPrep magazine.

He also was named All-Bay Valley Athletic in basketball. His best game came in his junior season, posting career highs in points (33) and rebounds (18), during a 75–67 overtime victory over Pinole Valley High School. In 2014, he was inducted into the Antioch Sports Hall of Fame.

== College career ==
Lucky accepted a football scholarship from the University of Arizona, where he became a three-year starter for the Wildcats, starting 35 of his final 36 games. As a redshirt freshman, he appeared in 11 games, starting the last 2 contests, while making 5 receptions for 99 yards.

As a sophomore, he was named the starter at tight end, making 14 receptions for 168 yards and 2 touchdowns. As a junior, he finished fourth on the team with 13 receptions for 154 yards and 2 touchdowns, helping the team win the Insight.com Bowl. He started 35 of his final 36 games for the Wildcats, catching 46 passes for 534 yards and four TDs in his college career. He was fourth on the team in receiving yards.

As a senior, his role changed to focus more on blocking, but still was fourth on the team with 11 receptions for 142 yards. He had 40 knockdown blocks, helping the team average 213 rushing yards-per-game (14th in the nation). In the last game against Arizona State University, his blocking contributed to the offense gaining 607 rushing yards, including a school record 288 rushing yards by Trung Canidate.

He finished as one of the school's top receiving tight ends, with 43 receptions for 563 yards and 4 touchdowns. He also earned his degree in Political science.

== Professional career ==
Lucky was selected by the Dallas Cowboys in the seventh round (229th overall) of the 1999 NFL draft, with the intention of using him as a blocking tight end, because his size was comparable to that of an offensive tackle. His rookie season got off to a difficult start as he suffered a stress fracture in his left foot on August 27 and was forced to miss five weeks, including the first 2 games. On October 3, he earned his first career start and first career reception, both against the Arizona Cardinals. He appeared in 14 games with 4 starts, while making 5 receptions for 25 yards.

In 2000, he was expected to have a bigger role in the offense, He until suffering a career-threatening injury, tearing the ACL, MCL and PCL in his right knee during the pre-season opener against the Pittsburgh Steelers. He underwent re-constructive surgery to repair the ligaments in his knee on August 1, 2000, and was placed on the injured reserve list.

In 2001, he returned to action after 12 months of rehab, earning 5 starts in 16 games, behind tight end Jackie Harris. His blocking helped bring about a resurgence in the team's running game that saw the Cowboys rank third in the league with 136.5 yards-per-game on the ground. As a receiver, he recorded 13 receptions for 96 yards and his first and only career touchdown. In view of his comeback, his teammates voted him the recipient of their 2001 Ed Block Courage Award.

In 2002, he was the team's third-string tight end, appearing in 16 games (no starts) and making one reception for 22 yards. He also was a part of the 17-14 loss to the Seattle Seahawks, where Emmitt Smith broke the NFL all-time rushing record. He retired because of knee injuries after the season.

== Personal life ==
Off the field, he showed support for the Race for the Cure in the Dallas–Fort Worth metroplex, which benefits the Susan G. Komen for the Cure foundation. He also donated time to "Our Children's Center in Irving".

Lucky and his wife Deanna have a daughter, Madison. Deanna was a member of the inaugural Dallas Desperados Dancers team. Lucky and his family now live in Mesa, Arizona.
