= Markus Steele =

American football player (born 1979)

No. 52
- Position: Linebacker

Personal information
- Born: July 24, 1979 (age 47); Cleveland, Ohio, U.S.
- Listed height: 6 ft 3 in (1.91 m)
- Listed weight: 240 lb (109 kg)

Career information
- High school: Bedford (OH) St. Peter Chanel
- College: USC
- NFL draft: 2001: 4th round, 122nd overall pick

Career history
- Dallas Cowboys (2001–2003); Denver Broncos (2005)*; Northeast Ohio Predators (2013–2015)
- * Offseason or practice squad member only

Awards and highlights
- Junior College All-American (1998)

Career NFL statistics
- Tackles: 89
- Forced fumbles: 1
- Passes defended: 1
- Stats at Pro Football Reference

Markus Steele (born July 24, 1979) is an American former professional football player who was a linebacker for the Dallas Cowboys of the National Football League (NFL). He played college football for the USC Trojans.

== Early life ==
Steele attended the now defunct St. Peter Chanel High School, where he lettered in football and basketball. He played only two years of football and missed most of his junior season with a broken ankle. As a senior, he played running back and middle linebacker, scoring 17 touchdowns in just 6 games. Prior to their closing he was nominated to St. Peter Chanel's Hall of fame and his jersey was retired.

He enrolled Long Beach City College, where he collected 96 tackles, 20 tackles for loss, 8 sacks and 2 interceptions in his first year. As a sophomore he registered 93 tackles, 17 tackles for loss, 8 sacks, 3 forced fumbles, 2 blocked kicks, 4 carries for 39 yards (9.8-yard avg ) and 2 touchdowns, while helping the team achieve a No. 6 national ranking with a 10–1 record.

In 1999, he transferred to the University of Southern California and was given the number 55, which is a school tradition reserved for the best linebackers.

As a junior he was named the starter at weak-side linebacker. He played with a shoulder injury that required surgery at the end of the season, finishing with 91 tackles (second on the team), 62 solo tackles, 12 tackles for loss (led the team), 3 sacks, 6 passes defensed, one interception, 3 forced fumbles and 2 fumble recoveries. The next year he had 61 tackles (third on the team), 17 tackles for loss (led the team) and 3 sacks.

== Professional career ==
Pre-draft measurables
Height	Weight	Arm length	Hand span	20-yard shuttle	Three-cone drill	Vertical jump	Broad jump
6 ft 2 7/8 in (1.90 m)	232 lb (105 kg)	30 in (0.76 m)	9 in (0.23 m)	4.50 s	7.15 s	33.0 in (0.84 m)	9 ft 11 in (3.02 m)
All values from NFL Combine

=== Dallas Cowboys ===
Steele was selected by the Dallas Cowboys in the fourth round (122nd overall) of the 2001 NFL draft, because he was seen as a great athlete that lacked football instincts. After strong-side linebacker Darren Hambrick was waived by the team, following the fifth game of the season, and with little depth at the linebacker position, he was named the starter as a rookie. He played in 15 games (10 starts), making 51 tackles, 2 tackles for loss, one quarterback pressure, one forced fumble and 3 special teams tackles.

In 2002, he was relegated to a backup position after the Cowboys signed free agent Kevin Hardy. He still was able to start 3 games at middle linebacker because of injuries. He collected 18 tackles, one tackle for loss, 14 special teams tackles (fifth on the team) and blocked a punt against the San Francisco 49ers.

The next season, although Hardy left via free agency, he could not unseat free agent Al Singleton from the starter role. He posted 2 defensive tackles and 16 special teams tackles (third on the team).

Steele was waived on August 31, 2004, after playing in 42 games (12 starts), while totaling 71 tackles (49 solo) and 33 special teams tackles.

=== Denver Broncos ===
On January 1, 2005, Steele signed with the Denver Broncos as a free agent. He was released on August 30.

=== Northeast Ohio Predators ===
In 2013, he started playing, middle linebacker and coaching defense, for the Northeast Ohio Predators, which is a semi-professional team in the Heartland Football League. He married Kimberlee Steele

== NFL career statistics ==
Legend
**Bold**	Career high

=== Regular season ===
Year	Team	Games		Tackles					Interceptions					Fumbles			
Year	Team	GP	GS	Cmb	Solo	Ast	Sck	TFL	Int	Yds	TD	Lng	PD	FF	FR	Yds	TD
2001	DAL	**15**	**10**	**40**	**36**	4	0.0	**1**	0	0	0	0	**1**	**1**	0	0	0
2002	DAL	13	1	32	26	**6**	0.0	**1**	0	0	0	0	0	0	0	0	0
2003	DAL	14	0	17	11	**6**	0.0	0	0	0	0	0	0	0	0	0	0
		42	11	89	73	16	0.0	2	0	0	0	0	1	1	0	0	0

=== Playoffs ===
Year	Team	Games		Tackles					Interceptions					Fumbles			
Year	Team	GP	GS	Cmb	Solo	Ast	Sck	TFL	Int	Yds	TD	Lng	PD	FF	FR	Yds	TD
2003	DAL	**1**	0	0	0	0	0.0	0	0	0	0	0	0	0	0	0	0
		1	0	0	0	0	0.0	0	0	0	0	0	0	0	0	0	0
