= Landon Trusty =

American football player (born 1981)

Profile
- Position: Tight end

Personal information
- Born: October 9, 1981 (age 45); Hot Springs, Arkansas, U.S.

Career information
- College: Central Arkansas

Career history
- Dallas Cowboys (2004)*; San Diego Chargers (2005); Denver Broncos (2006)
- * Offseason or practice squad member only

Landon Trusty (born October 9, 1981) was an American football tight end. He played college football at the University of Central Arkansas.

Trusty was on the Dallas Cowboys' practice squad in 2004 and the San Diego Chargers' active roster in 2005. He spent the 2006 season on the injured reserve list of the Denver Broncos after tearing his anterior cruciate ligament in spring minicamp. The Broncos released him in May 2007.

Landon Trusty attended Lakeside High School in Hot Springs Arkansas. Currently, he still holds the record for most passing yards in a season. Trusty also led Lakeside to their only basketball state championship.
