= Javiar Collins =

American football player (born 1978)

No. 70
- Position: Offensive tackle

Personal information
- Born: April 13, 1978 (age 48); Saint Paul, Minnesota, U.S.
- Listed height: 6 ft 6 in (1.98 m)
- Listed weight: 322 lb (146 kg)

Career information
- High school: Saint Thomas Academy (Mendota Heights, Minnesota)
- College: Northwestern (1996–2000)
- NFL draft: 2001: undrafted

Career history
- Dallas Cowboys (2001–2003); → Frankfurt Galaxy (2002); Carolina Panthers (2004)*; Cleveland Browns (2004); Denver Broncos (2006)*
- * Offseason or practice squad member only

Career NFL statistics
- Games played: 10
- Games started: 4
- Stats at Pro Football Reference

Javiar Lawrence Collins (born April 13, 1978) is an American former professional football player who was an offensive tackle in the National Football League (NFL) for the Dallas Cowboys, Carolina Panthers, Cleveland Browns and Denver Broncos. He was also a member of the Frankfurt Galaxy in NFL Europe. He played college football for the Northwestern Wildcats.

== Early life ==
Collins attended Saint Thomas Academy, where played football and basketball. As a senior defensive tackle, he collected 105 tackles, 9 sacks and 4 forced fumbles, receiving All-state, All-metro and All-conference honors.

== College career ==
Collins accepted a football scholarship from Northwestern University. As a redshirt freshman, he appeared in 8 games playing mainly on special teams.

As a sophomore he appeared in 12 games, starting 5 at defensive tackle, while registering 36 tackles (3 for loss) and one sack. As a junior, he posted 38 tackles and 4 sacks.

As a senior, he started at defensive tackle and was a part of a team that earned three-way tie for the Big Ten conference championship. He finished with 12 starts, 52 tackles (11 for loss), 3 sacks, 2 quarterback hurries, 1 fumble recovery and 1 forced fumble.

== Professional career ==
=== Dallas Cowboys ===
Collins was signed as an undrafted free agent by the Dallas Cowboys after the 2001 NFL draft. As a rookie, he was converted finto an offensive tackle in the first week of the regular season and was declared inactive for all 16 games. He was allocated to the Frankfurt Galaxy for the 2002 NFL Europe season, where he was named a starter.

In 2002, he appeared in 9 games, starting 4 games at right tackle, including the 17–14 loss to the Seattle Seahawks where running back Emmitt Smith broke the NFL all-time rushing record. In that same contest, he suffered a sprained MCL in his right knee, that forced him to miss 6 games, returning until the season finale. The next year, he was declared inactive in 14 games.

On August 24, 2004, after being demoted to third string, he was traded to the Carolina Panthers in exchange for a conditional draft choice (not exercised).

=== Carolina Panthers ===
Collins was waived by the Carolina Panthers on September 4, 2004.

=== Cleveland Browns ===
On October 20, 2004, he was signed as a free agent by the Cleveland Browns. He was released on November 4. On November 9, he was re-signed after Kelvin Garmon was placed on the injured reserve list. He was declared inactive in 9 games. He was released on August 28, 2005.

=== Denver Broncos ===
On January 3, 2006, Collins was signed by the Denver Broncos, and was cut on August 29.
