= Colston Weatherington =

American football player (born 1977)

No. 95, 55
- Position: Defensive lineman / Offensive lineman

Personal information
- Born: October 29, 1977 (age 49); Graceville, Florida, U.S.
- Listed height: 6 ft 6 in (1.98 m)
- Listed weight: 272 lb (123 kg)

Career information
- High school: Graceville
- College: Central Missouri State
- NFL draft: 2001: 7th round, 207th overall pick

Career history
- Dallas Cowboys (2001–2003); → Amsterdam Admirals (2002); Philadelphia Eagles (2004)*; Dallas Desperados (2004–2008); Orlando Predators (2010)
- * Offseason or practice squad member only

Awards and highlights
- Division II All-American (1999); Third-team Division II All-American (2000); MIAA Defensive MVP (1999); 2× All-MIAA (1999, 2000); AFL All Rookie team (2004); 2× AFL Lineman of the Year (2006, 2008); 3× First-team All-Arena (2006, 2007, 2008)

Career NFL statistics
- Games played: 3
- Stats at Pro Football Reference
- Stats at ArenaFan.com

Colston Weatherington (born October 29, 1977) is an American former professional football player who was a defensive lineman for the Dallas Cowboys of the National Football League (NFL). He played college football for the Central Missouri Mules. He also was a member of the Dallas Desperados of the Arena Football League (AFL).

== Early life ==
Weatherington attended Rehobeth Elementary/High School in Dothan, AL, until transferring to Graceville High School for his junior and senior years, where he was named All-state and helped the team win a Class 2A championship and a second-place finish.

After being out of football for two years while enrolled at Northwest Mississippi Community College, he joined the football team until 1998, recording 68 tackles (18 for loss), 13 sacks, 3 passes defensed and 5 forced fumbles, earning All-state and All-region community college honors. He played in the Mineral Water Bowl and was named the game's defensive MVP, even though his team lost 41–3.

In 1999, he transferred to Central Missouri State for his sophomore season, registering 52 tackles (19 for loss), 12 sacks (led the team) and 2 fumble recoveries, while earning Division II All-American and MIAA Defensive MVP honors. He also played for the basketball team, averaging 1.3 points and 1.5 rebounds in 17 games.

As a junior, he finished with 32 tackles (22 for loss), 7 sacks and 7 passes defensed, receiving All-MIAA and third-team Division II All-American honors. He declared early to the NFL draft, leaving with one year remaining of eligibility.

In 2012, he was inducted into the University of Central Missouri Athletics Hall of Fame.

== Professional career ==
=== Dallas Cowboys ===
Weatherington was selected by the Dallas Cowboys in the seventh round (207th overall) of the 2001 NFL draft. His progress in training camp was slowed after suffering a high right ankle sprain in the preseason opener against the Oakland Raiders and missed the next 4 contests. He was released on September 2 and signed to the practice squad.

In 2002, he was allocated to the Amsterdam Admirals of NFL Europe, where he recorded 15 tackles and a forced fumble. In the NFL regular season, he played in only 3 games (inactive in 11 contests), making one tackle and one pressure.

The next year, he was tried at defensive tackle, before being waived on August 31, 2003. He was signed to the practice squad and eventually cut on October 28.

=== Philadelphia Eagles ===
On August, 17, 2004, he was signed as a free agent by the Philadelphia Eagles. He was released on August 30.

=== Dallas Desperados ===
On December 18, 2003, he signed with the Dallas Desperados of the Arena Football League, who were owned by Jerry Jones, who also owned the Dallas Cowboys. After learning to be a two-way player and blocking as an offensive lineman, he earned AFL All-Rookie honors when he registered team-highs in sacks (7.5), quarterback pressures (5), forced fumbles (2) and blocked kicks (5).

The next year, he finished with 17 tackles, 3.5 sacks (second on the team), 7.5 tackles for losses (led team), 9 quarterback pressures (led team) and 4 touchdowns. In 2006, he became one of the league's best players, recording 13.5 tackles (9 for loss), 7.5 sacks (led team), 4 forced fumbles, one safety, 2 passes defensed and 3 touchdowns. He also earned AFL Lineman of the Year and All-Arena honors.

In 2007, he was named to the All-Arena team after registering 19.5 tackles (10.5 for loss), 10 sacks (second most in the AFL), 7 passes defensed, 5 forced fumbles and 2 blocked kicks. In 2008, he led the league in sacks (10.5) and ranked second in tackles for loss (11.0). He played five seasons until the team folded on August 4, 2009, upon the dissolving of the original AFL.

=== Orlando Predators ===
In 2010, he was assigned to the Orlando Predators of the Arena Football League.
