= John Nix (gridiron football) =

American gridiron football player (born 1976)

No. 60, 64
- Position: Defensive lineman

Personal information
- Born: November 24, 1976 (age 49); Lucedale, Mississippi, U.S.
- Listed height: 6 ft 1 in (1.85 m)
- Listed weight: 313 lb (142 kg)

Career information
- High school: George County (Lucedale, Mississippi)
- College: Southern Mississippi
- NFL draft: 2001: 7th round, 240th overall pick

Career history
- Dallas Cowboys (2001–2002); San Francisco 49ers (2003)*; Cleveland Browns (2003); Arizona Cardinals (2004); → Amsterdam Admirals (2004); Montreal Alouettes (2005–2006); Las Vegas Gladiators (2007); New York Dragons (2007–2008); Dallas Vigilantes (2010)
- * Offseason or practice squad member only

Awards and highlights
- Freshman All-American (1997); All-C-USA (2000); All-Freshman team C-USA (1997); AFL All-Rookie Team (2007)

Career NFL statistics
- Tackles: 21
- Forced fumbles: 2
- Stats at Pro Football Reference
- Stats at ArenaFan.com

John G. Nix (born November 24, 1976) is an American former professional football player who was a defensive lineman in the National Football League (NFL) for the Dallas Cowboys, Cleveland Browns and Arizona Cardinals. He also was a member of the Amsterdam Admirals in NFL Europe, the Montreal Alouettes of the Canadian Football League (CFL), and played in the Arena Football League (AFL). He played college football at the University of Southern Mississippi.

== Early life ==
Nix attended George County High School, where as a senior he made 75 tackles, while receiving second-team All-state and district's most valuable defensive lineman honors. He was also invited to play in the Mississippi/Alabama High School All-Star Game.

He also practiced track, finishing third in the state's shot put competition.

== College career ==
Nix accepted a football scholarship from the University of Southern Mississippi. He became a starter at defensive tackle as a redshirt freshman, posted 45 tackles, while helping his team to a 9–3 record and a 41–7 win over the University of Pittsburgh in the 1997 Liberty Bowl.

The next year, he started 9 out of 11 games, collecting 47 tackles. As a junior, he was limited throughout the season with a toe injury, making 21 tackles and 2 sacks, while helping his team win the Conference USA championship with a 9–3 record and a 23–17 win over Colorado State University in the 1999 Liberty Bowl.

As a senior, he registered 33 tackles (7 for loss), 4 sacks, helping the team rank second in the nation in total defense and to win 28–21 over Texas Christian University in the 2000 Mobile Alabama Bowl. He finished his college career with 146 tackles (65 solo), 9 sacks and 22 tackles for loss.

== Professional career ==
=== Dallas Cowboys ===
Nix was selected by the Dallas Cowboys in the seventh round (240th overall) of the 2001 NFL draft. As a rookie, he was the backup of defensive tackle Brandon Noble and recorded 22 tackles and 2 forced fumbles. He is better known for causing a key fumble that helped the team win 9–7 against the Washington Redskins in week 5.

The next year, he played 14 games, finishing with 21 tackles, 9 quarterback pressures and one forced fumble. In 2003, with the arrival of new head coach Bill Parcells, he was waived on August 25.

=== San Francisco 49ers ===
On August 26, 2003, he was claimed off waivers by the San Francisco 49ers and released five days later.

=== Cleveland Browns ===
Nix was signed as a free agent by the Cleveland Browns on December 23, 2003. He was allocated to the Amsterdam Admirals of the NFL Europe in 2004, where he started 10 games at defensive tackle, while recording 21 tackles and two sacks. He was cut from the Browns on September 5, 2004.

=== Arizona Cardinals ===
On September 8, 2004, he signed as a free agent with the Arizona Cardinals. He was cut on October 6, after being inactive in 3 games.

=== Montreal Alouettes ===
In 2005, he joined the Montreal Alouettes of the Canadian Football League. He began the season as a starter on defense until he injured his shoulder during the eighth game. He played one more season for Montreal, before leaving to join the Arena Football League back in the United States.

=== Arena Football League (2007–2010) ===
In 2007, Nix signed with the Las Vegas Gladiators and registered 2 tackles and one sack in two games. He was traded to the New York Dragons on March 13, earning Arena Football League (AFL) All-Rookie honors after playing in 15 games, while making 10.5 tackles, 2 tackles-for-loss, 2 sacks (tied for the team lead) and two quarterback pressures. In eight games in 2008, he recorded 8 tackles and one fumble recovery.

== See also ==
- List of Arena Football League and National Football League players
