= Darren Woodson =

American football player (born 1969)

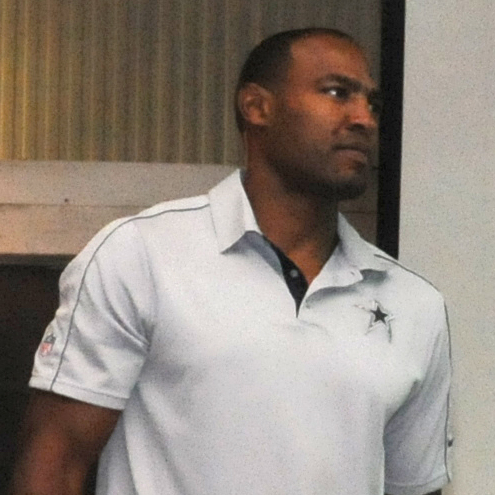
- Woodson in 2012

No. 28
- Position: Safety

Personal information
- Born: April 25, 1969 (age 57); Phoenix, Arizona, U.S.
- Listed height: 6 ft 1 in (1.85 m)
- Listed weight: 224 lb (102 kg)

Career information
- High school: Maryvale (Phoenix)
- College: Arizona State
- NFL draft: 1992: 2nd round, 37th overall pick

Career history
- Dallas Cowboys (1992–2003)

Awards and highlights
- 3× Super Bowl champion (XXVII, XXVIII, XXX); 3× First-team All-Pro (1994–1996); 5× Pro Bowl (1994–1998); PFWA All-Rookie Team (1992); Dallas Cowboys Ring of Honor

Career NFL statistics
- Tackles: 1,350
- Interceptions: 23
- Touchdowns: 2
- Forced fumbles: 17
- Fumble recoveries: 11
- Sacks: 11
- Stats at Pro Football Reference

Darren Raye Woodson (born April 25, 1969) is an American former professional football player who spent his entire career as a safety for the Dallas Cowboys of the National Football League (NFL) from 1992 to 2003. He played college football for the Arizona State Sun Devils, and was selected by the Cowboys in the second round of the 1992 NFL draft with the 37th overall pick. He finished his career with five Pro Bowl selections, including three first-team All-Pro selections, and won three Super Bowls.

== Early life ==
Woodson was raised by his mother, Freddie Luke, in Maryvale, a West Phoenix neighborhood. A running back and linebacker at Maryvale High School, he earned All-Metro Division AAA and All-City honors as a senior, once scoring six touchdowns in a single game. He was a teammate of Phillippi Sparks, who would go on to play nine seasons in the NFL.

In August 2008, ESPNRISE.com named Woodson as one of the best high school players to ever come out of Arizona.

== College career ==
According to a January 23, 1996, article in The New York Times, because Woodson failed to meet NCAA academic qualifications for a scholarship, he walked on at Arizona State University. According to the article, "Woodson built a reputation as a ferocious hitter with a keen eye for football."

An undersized linebacker who wore #6 in college, Woodson was coached by ASU linebackers coach Lovie Smith, future NFL head coach.

As a sophomore in 1989, he was voted the team's "Most Improved" player, after leading it in total tackles (122) and tackles for loss (5), including a 16 tackle game against Stanford University.

During his senior year, he showed his great athleticism by lining up during 2 games as a defensive end and playing on several occasions as an inside linebacker. Woodson finished his college career with 803 tackles and was invited to play on the Blue–Gray Football Classic.

A three-year starter at outside linebacker for the Sun Devils, Woodson earned honorable mention All-Pac-10 honors in 1989 and 1990, honorable mention All-America as a junior and All-Pac-10 second-team as a senior. He served as team captain as a senior in 1991 and earned a degree in criminal justice.

In 2005, he was inducted into the Arizona State University Hall of Fame. In April 2009, Woodson was inducted into the Arizona Sports Hall of Fame.

== Professional career ==
Woodson participated at Arizona State's pro day and performed positional drills and ran a 4.38 in the 40-yard dash. Dallas Cowboys' defensive backs coach Dave Campo "spotted a linebacker who looked like a safety in waiting." and had Woodson perform defensive back drills. Woodson was considered to be an undersized linebacker prospect.

Pre-draft measurables
Height	Weight	Arm length	Hand span	40-yard dash	10-yard split	20-yard split	20-yard shuttle	Vertical jump	Broad jump	Bench press
6 ft 1 in (1.85 m)	219 lb (99 kg)	33 in (0.84 m)	9 5/8 in (0.24 m)	4.53 s	1.58 s	2.59 s	4.28 s	37 1/2 in (0.95 m)	10 ft 8 in (3.25 m)	19 reps
All values from NFL Combine

=== 1992 ===
The Dallas Cowboys selected Woodson in the second round (37th overall) of the 1992 NFL draft. He was the third safety drafted in 1992 and was selected with one of the draft picks the Dallas Cowboys acquired from the Minnesota Vikings in the Herschel Walker trade. The Cowboys selected Woodson at the recommendation of defensive coordinator Dave Campo.

On July 27, 1992, the Dallas Cowboys signed Woodson to a four-year, $1.92 million contract. Throughout training camp, he competed to be a starting safety against James Washington. Head coach Jimmy Johnson named Woodson the backup strong safety to begin the regular season, behind Thomas Everett.

He made his professional regular season debut in the Dallas Cowboys' season-opening 23–10 win against the Washington Redskins. On November 8, 1992, Woodson made his first career start during a 37–3 win at the Detroit Lions in Week 10. On December 27, 1992, he made his first career sack on Bears' backup quarterback Will Furrer during the Cowboys' 27–14 victory against the Chicago Bears in Week 17. Woodson finished his rookie season in 1992 as a backup safety and an extra defensive back on the nickel defense. He also appeared on special teams and led team with 19 special teams tackles and had one sack on defense in 16 games and two starts.

The Dallas Cowboys finished the 1992 NFL season atop the NFC East with a 13–3 record and earned a first round bye. On January 10, 1993, Woodson appeared in his first career playoff game as the Cowboys defeated the Philadelphia Eagles 34–10 in the NFC Divisional Round. The following week, earned a 30–20 victory at the San Francisco 49ers in the NFC Championship Game. On January 31, 1993, he played in Super Bowl XXVII where they defeated the Buffalo Bills 52–17.

=== 1993 ===
On August 2, 1993, Woodson broke his right forearm during the Cowboys' 13–7 preseason loss to the Minnesota Vikings and was expected to be sidelined for two months. During training camp, he competed for a role as a starting safety against James Washington and Thomas Everett. Head coach Jimmy Johnson named Woodson the backup strong safety to begin the regular season in 1993, behind Everett. Woodson made the decision to play with his broken forearm before it had fully healed. On September 26, 1993, it was reported that Cowboys head coach Jimmy Johnson named Woodson as the new starting strong safety after he started the last two games in place of James Washington. Everett replaced Washington as the starting free safety with Woodson taking over Everett's role as the starting strong safety.

On January 2, 1994, Woodson collected a season-high 18 combined tackles during a 16–13 victory at the New York Giants in Week 17. His 19 tackles earned him the record for second most tackles in a game in the Cowboys' franchise history. Woodson finished the 1993 NFL season with 102 combined tackles in 16 games and 15 starts. The Dallas Cowboys finished the 1993 season first in the NFC East with a 12–4 record and earned a first round bye. On January 16, 1994, Woodson started his first career playoff game and made seven combined tackles and an interception during the Cowboys' 27–17 win against the Green Bay Packers in the NFC Divisional Round. Woodson made his first career interception off a pass by Packers quarterback Brett Favre during the game. The following week, he recorded four combined tackles during a 38–21 win against the San Francisco 49ers in the NFC Championship Game. On January 30, 1994, Woodson started in Super Bowl XXVIII and made three combined tackles during their 30–13 win against the Buffalo Bills.

=== 1994 ===
On March 29, 1994, Dallas Cowboys' head coach Jimmy Johnson announced his decision to resign due to multiple disagreements with owner Jerry Jones. On March 31, 1994, Dallas Cowboys' owner Jerry Jones announced the hiring of former Oklahoma Sooners head coach Barry Switzer as their new head coach. Switzer opted to retain Butch Davis as the Cowboys' defensive coordinator. Woodson was named the starting strong safety to start the regular season and started alongside free safety James Washington and cornerbacks Larry Brown and Kevin Smith.

On September 11, 1994, Woodson recorded eight combined tackles and made his first career regular season interception during a 20–17 win against the Houston Oilers in Week 2. Woodson intercepted a pass by Oilers'quarterback Bucky Richardson, that was intended for wide receiver Haywood Jeffires, and returned it for a three-yard gain in the third quarter. On October 9, 1994, Woodson made six combined tackles and a season-high two interceptions in the Cowboys' 38–3 victory against the Arizona Cardinals in Week 6. Woodson intercepted two passes by quarterback Jay Schroeder. In Week 8, he collected a season-high ten combined tackles in a 28–21 victory at the Arizona Cardinals. On December 4, 1994, Woodson recorded four combined tackles and returned an interception for his first career touchdown during the Cowboys' 31–19 win at the Philadelphia Eagles in Week 14. Woodson started in all 16 games in 1994 and recorded 78 combined tackles, a career-high five interceptions, and two forced fumbles.

The Dallas Cowboys finished first in the NFC East with a 12–4 record and earned a first round bye. On January 8, 1995, Woodson made five combined tackles as the Cowboys defeated the Green Bay Packers 35–9 in the NFC Divisional Round. The following week, he recorded four combined tackles during a 38–28 loss to the San Francisco 49ers in the NFC Championship Game.

=== 1995 ===
Defensive backs coach Dave Campo was promoted to defensive coordinator after Butch Davis accepted the head coaching position at the University of Miami. Head coach Barry Switzer named Woodson the starting strong safety in 1995 and paired him with free safety Brock Marion. They started alongside cornerbacks Larry Brown and Deion Sanders. In Week 3, he collected a season-high nine combined tackles during a 23–17 win at the Minnesota Vikings. On October 1, 1995, Woodson recorded nine combined tackles, forced a fumble, and returned an interception for a touchdown in the Cowboys' 27–23 loss to the Washington Redskins in Week 5. Woodson intercepted a pass by Redskins quarterback Gus Frerotte, that was intended for defensive end Tony Woods and returned it for a 37-yard touchdown in the second quarter. He started in all 16 games in 1995 and recorded 94 combined tackles, two interceptions, and a touchdown. Woodson was selected to play in the 1996 Pro Bowl, marking the first selection of his career.

The Dallas Cowboys finished first in the NFC East with a 12–4 record and earned a first round bye. On January 7, 1996, Woodson made six combined tackles during a 30–11 victory against the Philadelphia Eagles in the NFC Divisional Round. The following week, he made six combined tackles as the Cowboys defeated the Green Bay Packers 38–27 in the NFC Championship Game. On January 28, 1996, Woodson made ten combined tackles as the Cowboys defeated the Pittsburgh Steelers in Super Bowl XXX. He earned his third Super Bowl victory in four seasons.

=== 1996 ===
On February 15, 1996, the Dallas Cowboys signed Woodson to a six-year, $18 million contract that includes a signing bonus of $5.40 million.

"Darren is the total package. He has a combination of size speed and lateral movement that is rare in a strong safety. In fact, he covers one-on-one so well he could be a corner. He is the kind of guy coaches like to build a team around."

— Dave Campo (1996)
Dallas Cowboys' Defensive coordinator

Woodson and Brock Marion returned as the Cowboys' starting safety duo in 1996. They started alongside cornerbacks Deion Sanders and Kevin Smith. In Week 8, he collected a season-high 11 combined tackles in the Cowboys' 32–28 win against the Atlanta Falcons. On December 15, 1996, Woodson recorded six combined tackles, forced a fumble, and made a season-high two interceptions during a 12–6 victory against the New England Patriots in Week 16. Woodson started in all 16 games in 1996 and recorded 78 combined tackles, five interceptions, and made a career-high three sacks. The Dallas Cowboys finished first in the NFC East with a 10–6 record, but were eliminated from the playoffs after losing 26–17 to the Carolina Panthers in the NFC Divisional Round.

=== 1997 ===
Head coach Barry Switzer retained the starting secondary in 1997. On September 7, 1997, Woodson recorded nine combined tackles, forced two fumbles, and made a sack as the Cowboys lost 25–22 at the Arizona Cardinals in Week 2. The following week, he collected a season-high ten combined tackles during a 21–20 victory against the Philadelphia Eagles in Week 3. Woodson was inactive for the Cowboys' Week 9 loss at the Philadelphia Eagles due to an injury. He was also sidelined for Dallas' Week 14 loss to the Tennessee Oilers after sustaining an injury the previous week. Woodson finished the 1997 season with 73 combined tackles, two sacks, and an interception in 14 games and 14 starts. He was also selected to play in the 1998 Pro Bowl.

=== 1998 ===
On January 9, 1998, Cowboys head coach Barry Switzer announced his decision to resign stating it was in the best interest of the team after they failed to make the playoffs with a 6–10 record in 1997. On February 13, 1998, the Cowboys hired former Pittsburgh Steelers offensive coordinator Chan Gailey as their new head coach. Gailey named Woodson the starting strong safety to begin the regular season, alongside free safety Omar Stoutmire.

In Week 11, he collected a season-high ten combined tackles during the Cowboys' 35–28 victory over the Arizona Cardinals. Woodson finished the 1998 NFL season with 77 combined tackles, three sacks, and an interception in 16 games and 15 starts. Woodson was selected to play in the 1999 Pro Bowl. He was also selected to his fourth First Team All Pro by The Sporting News. The Dallas Cowboys finished first in the NFC East with a 10–6 record, but were eliminated in the first round of the playoffs after losing 20–7 to the Cardinals in the wild card round. Woodson recorded two tackles and intercepted a pass by Cardinals quarterback Jake Plummer during the game.

=== 1999 ===
Woodson returned as the starting strong safety, but was paired with free safety George Teague. Woodson was sidelined for the Cowboys' Week 5 loss at the Philadelphia Eagles. In Week 15, he collected a season-high ten combined tackles during a 22–21 loss to the New York Jets. Woodson completed the 1999 NFL season with 70 combined tackles, two interceptions, two forced fumbles, and a sack in 15 games and 15 starts. The Cowboys finished second in their division with an 8–8 record and earned a wildcard berth, but were eliminated in the first round after a 27–10 loss at the Minnesota Vikings in the wild card round.

=== 2000 ===
On January 12, 2000, the Cowboys fired Gailey after a second first round exit from the playoffs. On January 26, 2000, Cowboys owner Jerry Jones officially promoted defensive coordinator Dave Campo to head coach. Campo was instrumental in drafting and converting Woodson and previously served as his position coach and coordinator.

On September 21, 2000, Woodson collected a season-high nine combined tackles, but was ejected during a 41–21 loss against the San Francisco 49ers in Week 4. Woodson was ejected after he became upset when officials didn't call a penalty on 49ers' center Jeremy Newberry. Newberry had stepped on Woodson's chest after the whistle blew, kicked the ball, and also threw his helmet. On November 19, 2000, Woodson recorded five combined tackles, but fractured his forearm during the Cowboys' 27–0 loss at the Baltimore Ravens in Week 12. Woodson was inactive for the last five games of the regular season (Weeks 13–17) due to his fractured forearm. He finished the season with 71 combined tackles and two interceptions in 11 games and 11 starts.

=== 2001 ===
On February 28, 2001, the Cowboys signed Woodson to a five-year, $20 million contract that includes a signing bonus of $5 million.

Woodson and George Teague returned as the starting safety tandem in 2001 under defensive coordinator Mike Zimmer. He started in the Dallas Cowboys' season-opener against the Tampa Bay Buccaneers and collected a season-high eight combined tackles and intercepted a pass in the Cowboys' 10–6 loss. In Week 10, Woodson tied his season-high of eight solo tackles, deflected two passes, and made an interception during a 36–3 loss to the Philadelphia Eagles. He started in all 16 games in 2001 and recorded 87 combined tackles (76 solo), seven pass deflections, and three interceptions. Following the season, he received the Bart Starr Award.

=== 2002 ===
Head coach Dave Campo retained Woodson as the starting strong safety in 2002, alongside starting free safety and rookie first round pick Roy Williams. In Week 3, he collected a season-high nine combined tackles during the Cowboys' 44–13 loss at the Philadelphia Eagles. On October 22, 2002, Woodson delivered a devastating hit to Seattle Seahawks wide receiver Darrell Jackson. The crown of Woodson's helmet hit Jackson under his chin. The blow knocked Jackson unconscious and he had a seizure in the locker room. Seahawks head coach Mike Holmgren stated Jackson almost died in the locker room as medical personnel struggled to keep his airway open while he was having a seizure for 40 minutes. A spokesman for the Seahawks later stated Jackson was never in immediate danger of dying because his heart was beating and he continued to breathe. The spokesman also stated that Holmgren meant to convey that Jackson could have died. Jackson was diagnosed with a concussion and was sidelined for a month, but stated he would not classify Woodson's blow as a "cheapshot". Woodson was subsequently fined $75,000 by the NFL. He also surpassed the Cowboys' franchise record for career tackles against the Seattle Seahawks. On November 17, 2002, Woodson sustained an abdominal injury during the Cowboys' 20–3 loss at the Indianapolis Colts in Week 11. On November 26, 2002, the Cowboys placed Woodson on injured reserve for the remaining five games of the regular season (Weeks 12–17). On December 30, 2002, the Cowboys fired Campo after they finished the 2002 season with a 5–11 record. He finished the season with 49 combined tackles (40 solo), a pass deflection, and an interception in ten games and ten starts.

=== 2003 ===
On March 26, 2003, the Cowboys hired Bill Parcells as their new head coach. Parcells retained Woodson and Roy Williams as the starting safeties in 2003. In Week 8, he collected a season-high ten combined tackles (seven solo) during a 16–0 loss at the Tampa Bay Buccaneers. On December 7, 2003, Woodson made six solo tackles and a season-high three pass deflections in the Cowboys' 36–10 loss at the Philadelphia Eagles in Week 14. He started in all 16 games in 2003 and recorded 85 combined tackles (65 solo), 14 pass deflections, an interception, and a sack.

=== 2004 ===
On July 27, 2004, Woodson underwent surgery to remove a herniated disc and was unable to physically participate in training camp. He sustained the injury while working out the previous week. On September 6, 2004, the Cowboys placed Woodson on their physically unable to participate list and he remained inactive for all 16 games.

=== Retirement ===
On December 29, 2004, Woodson officially announced his retirement from the NFL. He was the last remaining member of the Dallas Cowboys dynasty. He retired as the Dallas Cowboys' all-time leading tackler with 1,350 career tackles.

At the press conference to announce Woodson's retirement, Parcells, then head coach of the Cowboys, said: "[Woodson is] the kind of guy that makes this profession something that you like to engage in. He's the epitome of a professional. He does epitomize that in every sense. What he did in playing and his approach to the game."

"For 13 years, [Woodson] was everything you could ask for -- unselfish, reliable, dependable, a team player first and a team leader always. He's a living, breathing example of the saying that character does matter."

— Jerry Jones (2004)
Dallas Cowboys' owner

During his retirement press conference, Woodson said, "When I put that helmet on, I laid it on the line. Not just for this team, but for everyone here. I laid it on the line every time I put that helmet on. I wanted to win so bad, that nothing else really mattered. The most important thing was giving everything I had each time I stepped out on the field. And I think I did that."

==== Hall of Fame consideration ====
In October 2008, Woodson became a first-time candidate on the Pro Football Hall of Fame's preliminary list. In September 2011, he was included on the preliminary list of nominees for the Pro Football Hall of Fame Class of 2012.

In February 2011, ESPN.com writer Tim MacMahon wrote that Woodson "deserves serious Hall of Fame consideration and should join the Triplets on the modern side of the Dallas Cowboys Ring of Honor."

On August 4, 2015, the Dallas Cowboys announced that Woodson would be inducted into the Cowboys Ring of Honor. The official ceremony took place on November 1 against the Seahawks at AT&T Stadium. Woodson is the eighth defensive player inducted into the Ring of Honor, and just the second who played in the 1990s era, along with Charles Haley.

== NFL career statistics ==
Year	Team	GP	Tackles				Fumbles			Interceptions					
Year	Team	GP	Cmb	Solo	Ast	Sck	FF	FR	Yds	Int	Yds	Avg	Lng	TD	PD
1992	DAL	16	0	0	0	1.0	0	0	0	0	0	0	0	0	0
1993	DAL	16	102	85	17	0.0	1	3	3	0	0	0	0	0	9
1994	DAL	16	78	58	20	0.0	1	1	0	5	140	28	94T	1	10
1995	DAL	16	94	82	12	0.0	1	0	0	2	46	23	37T	1	7
1996	DAL	16	78	61	17	3.0	2	1	0	5	43	9	21	0	9
1997	DAL	14	73	52	21	2.0	3	2	0	1	14	14	14	0	9
1998	DAL	16	77	64	13	3.0	3	0	0	1	1	1	1	0	10
1999	DAL	15	70	58	12	1.0	1	0	0	2	5	3	5	0	13
2000	DAL	11	71	61	10	0.0	1	0	0	2	12	6	12	0	4
2001	DAL	16	87	76	11	0.0	1	1	0	3	11	4	6	0	7
2002	DAL	10	49	40	9	0.0	2	1	2	1	1	1	1	0	2
2003	DAL	16	85	65	20	1.0	1	2	0	1	-2	-2	-2	0	15
Career		178	864	702	162	11.0	17	11	5	23	271	12	94T	2	95

== Style of play ==
The only Cowboys player to suit up for both Jimmy Johnson and Bill Parcells, Woodson had a rare ability to play both the run and the pass. According to an article from July 3, 2009, on DallasCowboys.com, "While Woodson delivered his share of big-time hits from the safety position, he was always the team's slot cornerback, covering receivers inside, which is considered to be the toughest spot on the field. In today's game, most teams put their best cover corner in the slot, but Woodson did that for years from the safety position. With that, it helped the Cowboys stop the run as well, having a safety that close to the line of scrimmage without being a liability in coverage."

"Woodson had the run-stopping skills of a strong safety and the pass-coverage ability of a free safety. His ability to cover slot receivers made a significant difference for the defense."

— Gerry Fraley, The Dallas Morning News

In a December 30, 2004, article published in Knight Ridder newspapers, Clarence Hill described Woodson as "the most versatile safety in the league and arguably the best in (Dallas Cowboys) history."

An October 31, 1994, article in Sports Illustrated described Woodson as "a masher who doubles as an outside linebacker in passing situations" and "the most productive player on the best defense in the NFL." According to the author, "A combination of strength, brute-force hitting and speed—4.35 seconds in the 40—makes Woodson the most versatile player on the Super Bowl champions."

Former Cowboys coach Jimmy Johnson described Woodson as "a player who could hit, tackle and take charge of a secondary. He did all those things with authority. He made his presence known on the football field, but played within the scheme and played smart."

He is generally regarded as the greatest safety in Cowboys history.

== Personal life ==
Woodson has two sons, DJ, and Jaden, and a daughter, Miranda from a previous marriage, and one son, Judea from his present marriage, he resides in Dallas, where he serves as a board member of Make a Wish Foundation (North Texas). Since his retirement, Woodson has worked as a football analyst for ESPN, appearing on programs such as NFL Live, SportsCenter, and First Take.

Woodson grew up in Phoenix and was the youngest of four siblings raised by his mother, Freddie Luke. He was a fan of the Pittsburgh Steelers and admitted in a New York Times article he couldn't stand the Cowboys. He decided to hit some golf balls while waiting to be drafted in 1992 and had his friend page him when he was selected. His friend told Woodson, "There's good news and bad news." Woodson asked for the bad news first and his friend replied "You were drafted by the Cowboys." He replied "I don't care. I'm just happy I was picked." Woodson was childhood friends with Phillippi Sparks and Kevin Miniefield and played alongside them at Arizona State. During his college career, he earned a degree in criminal justice at Arizona State.
