= Anthony Lucas (wide receiver) =

American football player (born 1976)

No. 87, 15
- Position: Wide receiver

Personal information
- Born: November 20, 1976 (age 49); Tallulah, Louisiana, U.S.
- Listed height: 6 ft 3 in (1.91 m)
- Listed weight: 194 lb (88 kg)

Career information
- High school: McCall (Tallulah)
- College: Arkansas (1995–1999)
- NFL draft: 2000: 4th round, 114th overall pick

Career history
- Green Bay Packers (2000); Dallas Cowboys (2001–2002)

Awards and highlights
- Freshman All-SEC (1995); Second-team All-SEC (1998); First-team All-SEC (1999); Arkansas All-Decade Team (1990s); UA Sports Hall of Fame (2019); Arkansas Sports Hall of Fame (2020)

Anthony Lucas (born November 20, 1976) is an American former professional football player who was a wide receiver in the National Football League (NFL). He played college football for the Arkansas Razorbacks. He was selected in the fourth round (114th overall) of the 2000 NFL draft by the Green Bay Packers . Lucas was also a member of the Dallas Cowboys. However, he never played in an NFL game.

== Early life and college ==
Lucas was born in Tallulah, Louisiana to Gerald and Rena Lucas. He then attended McCall High School before attending the University of Arkansas.

As a freshman in 1995, Lucas appeared in 11 games, catching passes from Arkansas QB Barry Lunney Jr. he recorded 27 receptions for 526 yards and four touchdowns. He helped Arkansas win their first SEC West Division championship in 1995, finishing the season (8-5). His sophomore season in 1996 was cut short during the season opener where we recorded three receptions for 32 yards before being injured and missing the rest of the season. As a redshirt sophomore in 1997, Lucas began catching passes from Arkansas QB Clint Stoerner. Lucas again appeared in 11 games, recording 27 receptions for 495 yards and four touchdowns. He also carried the ball one time for three yards. After the 1997 season, Arkansas head coach Danny Ford was fired, and Houston Nutt was hired as the new head coach. As a redshirt junior in 1998, Lucas became the first Razorback to ever have 1000 yards receiving in a single season, as he appeared in 10 games and recorded 43 receptions for 1,004 yards and 10 touchdowns. Lucas and the Razorbacks won the school's second SEC West Division championship, finishing with a (9-3) record. As a redshirt senior in 1999, he appeared in 10 games and recorded 37 receptions for 822 yards, and five touchdowns. Lucas and the Hogs beat the Texas Longhorns in the 2000 Cotton Bowl Classic, 27-6, finishing (8-4).

In March 2020, Lucas was inducted into the Arkansas Sports Hall of Fame.

== Professional career ==
Pre-draft measurables
Height	Weight	Arm length	Hand span	40-yard dash	10-yard split	20-yard split	Vertical jump	Broad jump
6 ft 2 3/4 in (1.90 m)	194 lb (88 kg)	31 7/8 in (0.81 m)	8 7/8 in (0.23 m)	4.51 s	1.60 s	2.66 s	35.0 in (0.89 m)	10 ft 1 in (3.07 m)
All values from NFL Combine

Lucas was selected in the fourth round (114th overall) in the 2000 NFL draft by the Green Bay Packers. He spent his entire rookie season on the Packers PUP list. He was waived on August 23, 2001.

On August 24, Lucas was claimed off waivers by the Dallas Cowboys. He was waived on September 2 and signed to the team's practice squad the next day. He spent the entire 2001 season on the practice squad. On August 12, 2002, he was waived/injured and reverted to injured reserve the next day.

== Personal life ==
As of 2020, Lucas was married to his wife Devae, and they have two daughters, Kassidy and Kaylee.
