= Randal Williams =

American football player (born 1978)

No. 89, 86
- Position: Wide receiver

Personal information
- Born: May 21, 1978 (age 48); Bronx, New York, U.S.
- Listed height: 6 ft 3 in (1.91 m)
- Listed weight: 235 lb (107 kg)

Career information
- High school: Deerfield Academy (MA)
- College: New Hampshire
- NFL draft: 2001: undrafted

Career history
- Jacksonville Jaguars (2001); Dallas Cowboys (2001–2004); Oakland Raiders (2005–2006)

Career NFL statistics
- Games played: 67
- Receptions: 42
- Receiving yards: 471
- Return yards: 60
- Return touchdowns: 1
- Stats at Pro Football Reference

Randal Ellison Williams (born May 21, 1978) is an American former professional football player who was a wide receiver in the National Football League (NFL) for the Jacksonville Jaguars, Dallas Cowboys and Oakland Raiders. He played college football for the New Hampshire Wildcats.

== Early life ==
Williams attended Deerfield Academy, where he played wide receiver and defensive end in football.

He also practiced track, running in the 100 metres, 200 metres and 4 × 100 metres relay. He earned a silver medal in the 100-meters at the New England Prep School Championships and tied the school record.

== College career ==
Williams accepted a football scholarship from the University of New Hampshire. As a junior, he saw playing time as a running back and defensive end. He played in 11 games, posting 10 receptions for 149 yards (14.9-yard average), 3 receiving touchdowns, 4 carries for 26 yards and one tackle.

As a senior, he played in 7 games, finishing with 10 receptions for 258 yards (25.8-yard average), 4 receiving touchdowns, 47 carries for 163 yards, 3 rushing touchdowns and returned 8 punts for 146 yards (18.3-yard average).

== Professional career ==
=== Jacksonville Jaguars ===
Williams was signed as an undrafted free agent by the Jacksonville Jaguars after the 2001 NFL draft, who were intrigued by his size to speed ratio. He was declared inactive in the first 6 games until being waived on October 27.

=== Dallas Cowboys ===
On October 29, 2001, he was claimed off waivers by the Dallas Cowboys. As a rookie, he played in 7 games (2 inactive) and had 7 special teams tackles. In 2002, he finished sixth on the team with 11 special teams tackles.

In a 2003, he tallied 11 special teams tackles. In a game against the Philadelphia Eagles, he returned an onside kick for a touchdown which officially took just three seconds, making it the fastest touchdown since the league started using the scoreboard clock in 1970. However, for Williams to have run 37 yards in three seconds would have required the equivalent of a 9.8 second 100-metre dash, which is somewhat unlikely given that he was wearing football pads and slowed before reaching the goal-line. Replays show that the game clock didn't actually start until after Williams took a few steps (at least two seconds).

In 2004, he missed most of the year with a fractured scapula in his right shoulder. During his time with the Cowboys he was given the chance to play several games at wide receiver, but only caught one pass and was eventually cut on April 28, 2005.

=== Oakland Raiders ===
On August 2, 2005, he was signed as a free agent by the Oakland Raiders, with the intention of converting him into a tight end. He posted 13 receptions for 164 yards.

In 2006 he started 10 games, collecting 28 receptions for 293 yards (18.3-yard average) until being replaced by Courtney Anderson. The next year, he left training camp for three days to deal with "personal issues", which led to his release on August 4, 2007.
