= Kelvin Garmon =

American football player (born 1976)

No. 61, 63
- Position: Offensive guard

Personal information
- Born: October 26, 1976 (age 50); Fort Worth, Texas, U.S.
- Listed height: 6 ft 2 in (1.88 m)
- Listed weight: 350 lb (159 kg)

Career information
- High school: Haltom (Haltom City, Texas)
- College: Baylor
- NFL draft: 1999: 7th round, 243rd overall pick

Career history
- Dallas Cowboys (1999–2002); San Diego Chargers (2002–2003); Cleveland Browns (2004); Oakland Raiders (2006)*
- * Offseason or practice squad member only

Career NFL statistics
- Games played: 52
- Stats at Pro Football Reference

Kelvin Garmon (born October 26, 1976) is an American former professional football player who was an offensive guard in the National Football League (NFL). He played college football for the Baylor Bears and was selected by the Dallas Cowboys in the seventh round of the 1999 NFL draft. Garmon was also a member of the San Diego Chargers, Cleveland Browns, and Oakland Raiders.

== Early life ==
Garmon attended Haltom High School in Haltom City, Texas. He played on the offensive and defensive line. He earned All-district and All-state honors as a senior, after making 80 tackles and 10 sacks. He also practiced basketball and track.

He accepted a football scholarship from Baylor University. As a redshirt freshman, he was a backup offensive lineman. As a sophomore, he started the first 5 games at right guard and the next 6 at left tackle.

As a junior, he started the first 5 games at right tackle, before switching to right guard for the last 6 contests. He made 58 knockdown blocks, including 15 against Oklahoma State University.

As a senior, he played every position on the offensive line except center, but only in 4 games due to a fractured right tibia. Before the injury he had 17 knockdown blocks.

== Professional career ==
=== Dallas Cowboys ===
Garmon was selected by the Dallas Cowboys in the seventh round (243rd overall) of the 1999 NFL draft, after dropping because of his broken leg. He spent his first season on the Reserve-Non-Football Injury list, recovering from the injury he suffered during his senior year in college. In 2000, he was declared inactive for the first 15 games, while regaining his playing form. He was active in the season finale against the Tennessee Titans, but did not play.

In 2001, he started all 16 games at right guard, after the team moved Solomon Page to right tackle. He contributed to the team rushing for 136.5 yards-per-game (third in the league).

It is believed 2002 was the first time an NFL franchise had five African American starters on their offensive line, when the Cowboys lined up rookie center Andre Gurode, tackles Flozell Adams and Solomon Page, guards Larry Allen and Garmon. That season, he started five games (3 at right guard and 2 at left guard) before being traded to the San Diego Chargers.

=== San Diego Chargers ===
On October 12, 2002, the Cowboys traded Garmon to the San Diego Chargers in exchange for a seventh round draft pick (#236-Brandon Drumm), reuniting with Hudson Houck who was his offensive line coach with the Cowboys. He went on to start five out of the seven remaining games at left guard. In 2003, he started all 16 games for the Chargers.

=== Cleveland Browns ===
On March 23, 2004, Garmon signed with the Cleveland Browns as a free agent. He started eight games before suffering a knee injury and being placed on the injured reserve list on November 9. He was released on March 28, 2005.

=== Oakland Raiders ===
On April 20, 2006, he signed as a free agent with the Oakland Raiders. He was released before the season started on September 2.
