= 2003 Dallas Cowboys season =

NFL team season

- Owner: Jerry Jones
- General manager: Jerry Jones
- Head coach: Bill Parcells
- Home stadium: Texas Stadium

Results
- Record: 10–6
- Division place: 2nd NFC East
- Playoffs: Lost Wild Card Playoffs (at Panthers) 10–29
- All-Pros: Roy Williams (1st team); La'Roi Glover (2nd team); Dat Nguyen (2nd team)
- Pro Bowlers: Flozell Adams T Larry Allen G Dexter Coakley LB; La'Roi Glover DT; Roy Williams S

Uniform
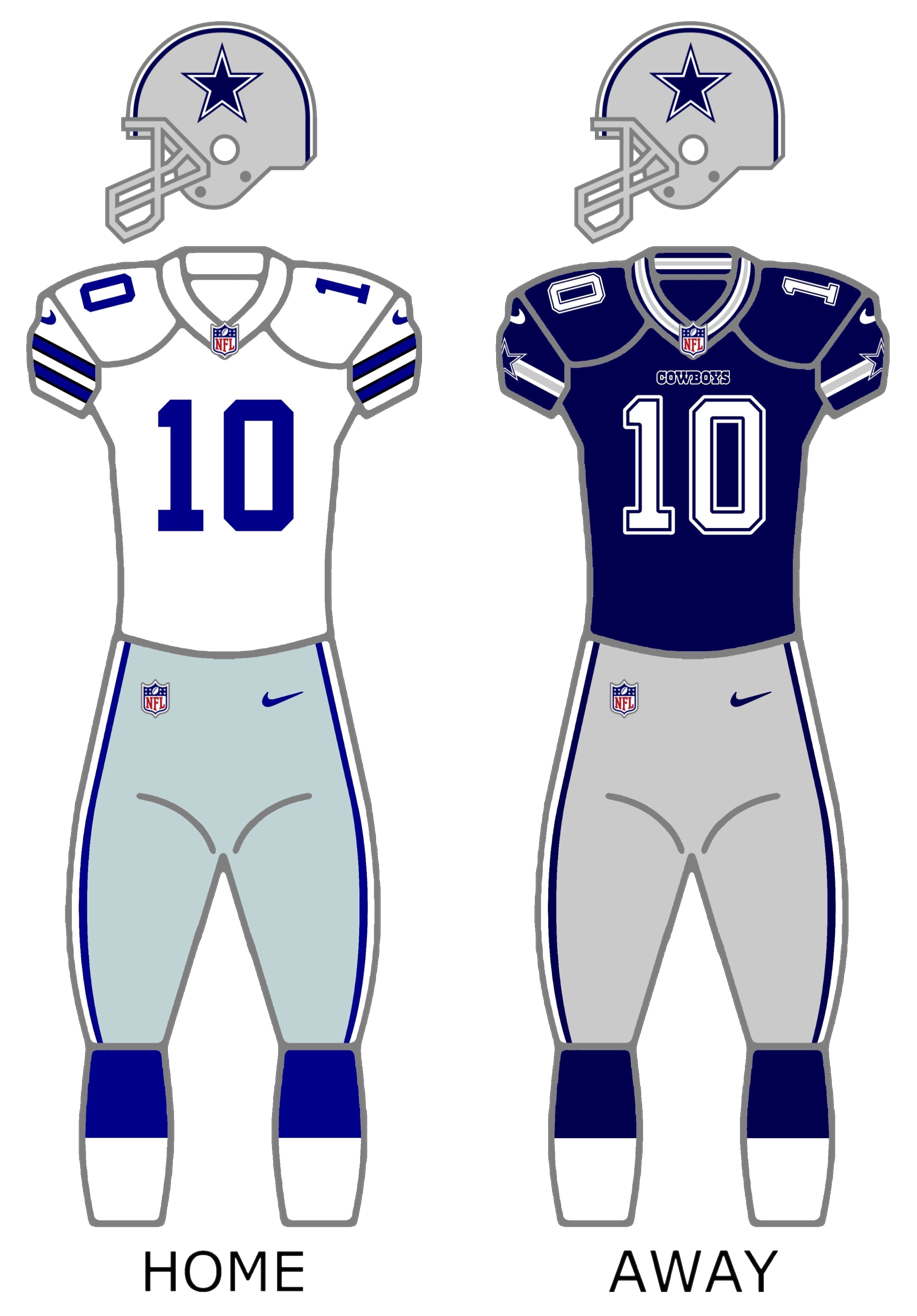

The 2003 Dallas Cowboys season was the 44th season for the team in the National Football League (NFL) and the first under head coach Bill Parcells. For the first time since 1989, Emmitt Smith was not on the opening day roster, culminating with for the first time since 1987, neither Michael Irvin (1988–1999), Aikman (1989–2000) on the roster either. Coming off three consecutive 5–11 seasons, Dallas hired former New York Giants, New England Patriots, and New York Jets coach Bill Parcells. In a scheduling coincidence, the Cowboys faced all three said teams in the 2003 regular season. The team was vastly improved and posted a 10–6 record (the best finish in the Parcells era), clinching their first winning season since 1998 and clinching their first playoff berth since 1999. In the Wild Card round of the playoffs the team lost to the eventual NFC champion Carolina Panthers 29–10.

== Offseason ==
Additions	Subtractions
FB Richie Anderson (Jets)	RB Emmitt Smith (Cardinals)
WR Terry Glenn (Packers)	G Ross Tucker (Bills)
T Ryan Young (Texans)	LB Kevin Hardy (Bengals)
TE Dan Campbell (Giants)	DT Brandon Noble (Redskins)
LB Al Singleton (Buccaneers)	T Solomon Page (Chargers)
	DE Peppi Zellner (Redskins)

=== Draft class ===
2003 Dallas Cowboys draft
Round	Pick	Player	Position	College	Notes
1	5	Terence Newman *	CB	Kansas State	
2	38	Al Johnson	C	Wisconsin	
3	69	Jason Witten *	TE	Tennessee	
4	103	Bradie James	LB	LSU	
6	178	B. J. Tucker	CB	Wisconsin	
6	186	Zuriel Smith	WR	Hampton	
7	219	Justin Bates	G	Colorado	
Made roster † Pro Football Hall of Fame * Made at least one Pro Bowl during career

Notes

- The Cowboys traded their 2002 seventh-round (No. 237 overall) and 2003 fifth-round (No. 140 overall) selections to the New England Patriots for a 2002 fifth-round (No. 168 overall) selection.
- The Cowboys traded their 2002 first-round (No. 6 overall) selection to the Kansas City Chiefs in exchange for 2002 first (No. 8 overall) and third-round (No. 75 overall) selections, and a 2003 sixth-round (No. 186 overall) selection.

=== Undrafted free agents ===
2003 undrafted free agents of note
Player	Position	College
Charles Alston	Wide receiver	Bowie State
Erik Bickerstaff	Running back	Wisconsin
Aaron Boone	Wide receiver	Kentucky
ReShard Lee	Running back	Middle Tennessee State
Jonathan Martin	Safety	South Carolina
Don McGee	Cornerback	North Texas
Keith O'Neil	Linebacker	Northern Arizona
Tony Romo	Quarterback	Eastern Illinois
Shaun Smith	Defensive Tackle	South Carolina
Noah Swartz	Tackle/Guard	Toledo
Torrin Tucker	Tackle	Southern Miss
Darrell Wright	Defensive end	Oregon

== Roster ==
Dallas Cowboys 2003 roster
Quarterbacks: 17 Quincy Carter; 7 Chad Hutchinson; 9 Tony Romo; Running backs: 20 Richie Anderson FB; 29 Michael Bates KR; 46 Erik Bickerstaff; 42 Troy Hambrick; 34 Jamar Martin FB; Wide receivers: 88 Antonio Bryant; 84 Joey Galloway PR; 83 Terry Glenn; 87 Zuriel Smith KR/PR; 89 Randal Williams; Tight ends: 86 Dan Campbell; 85 Jeff Robinson LS; 81 James Whalen; 82 Jason Witten	Offensive linemen: 76 Flozell Adams T; 73 Larry Allen G; 70 Javiar Collins T; 65 Andre Gurode G; 68 Matt Lehr C; 77 Torrin Tucker T; 78 Kurt Vollers T; 71 Tyson Walter C/G; 75 Ryan Young G/T; Defensive linemen: 99 Willie Blade DT; 92 Jermaine Brooks DT; 93 Kenyon Coleman DE; 96 Ebenezer Ekuban DE; 98 Greg Ellis DE; 97 La'Roi Glover DT; 90 Eric Ogbogu DE; 64 Daleroy Stewart DT	Linebackers: 50 Jamal Brooks MLB; 52 Dexter Coakley OLB; 56 Bradie James MLB; 59 Dat Nguyen MLB; 54 Keith O'Neil OLB; 58 Scott Shanle OLB; 51 Al Singleton OLB; 55 Markus Steele OLB; Defensive backs: 26 Andrew Davison CB; 24 Tony Dixon SS; 27 Mario Edwards CB; 47 Pete Hunter CB; 41 Terence Newman CB; 25 Jemeel Powell CB; 38 Lynn Scott FS; 31 Roy Williams FS; 28 Darren Woodson SS; Special teams: 3 Billy Cundiff K; 4 Toby Gowin P	Reserve lists: 91 Leonardo Carson DT (IR); 23 Aveion Cason RB (IR); 63 Gennaro DiNapoli G/C (IR); 62 Al Johnson C (IR); 30 Donald Mitchell CB (IR); Practice squad: 80 Cedric James WR; 48 ReShard Lee RB; 1 Mat McBriar P; 66 Shaun Smith DT; 72 Dave Volk T; Rookies in italics 53 active, 5 inactive, 5 practice squad

== Regular season ==
Despite the release of team legend Emmitt Smith, the Cowboys' fortunes began to change with the introduction of Parcells as head coach. Parcells began to reshape the team, particularly on offense, with an overhaul of the coaching staff, including former New York Giants offensive coordinator Sean Payton. Parcells retained much of the defensive staff, including defensive coordinator Mike Zimmer, and maintained the team's basic 4–3 defense instead of immediately installing the 3–4 defense which was a trademark of all Parcells's prior teams. This proved a wise decision, as the Cowboys finished the season with the top-ranked overall defense. As in his previous stops, Parcells started to rebuild his team through the draft. In his first year in Dallas, Parcells picked future Pro Bowl players cornerback Terence Newman, tight end Jason Witten and future Cowboys defensive captain linebacker Bradie James. One of the biggest rookie acquisitions came via free agency when the team signed undrafted rookie and future franchise quarterback Tony Romo (although that move got little attention for a few years). Also typical of his prior teams, Parcells brought in veteran players who had played for him at his previous coaching stops, signing fullback Richie Anderson and speedy wide receiver Terry Glenn with whom Parcells had a checkered history.

Though the Cowboys opened the season with a loss, a dramatic come-from-behind victory the next week against the Giants at New York spurred the team's confidence, particularly in third-year quarterback Quincy Carter. This was followed by a reunion with Emmitt Smith (now with the Arizona Cardinals) in Dallas. Smith injured his shoulder early in the game and did not return. After starting with a 7–2 record, the Cowboys went 3–4 in the second half of the season including a loss to the eventual Super Bowl champion New England Patriots in Foxboro. The game received a lot of hype due to Bill Parcells's and Patriots head coach Bill Belichick's seemingly strained relationship due to the events following their final season coaching together with the New York Jets. Though the Cowboys finished 10–6 and earned a playoff berth, they lost in the first round to the eventual NFC champions, the Carolina Panthers.

The Cowboys ranked first in total defense (253.5 yards per game), third in rushing defense, and second in scoring (16.3 points per game), which helped the team qualify for the playoffs for the first time in four years. In October, the Cowboys snapped a six-game losing streak to the Philadelphia Eagles (at halftime of the Eagles game, Tex Schramm was posthumously inducted into the club's Ring of Honor).

This turned out to be the final season for long-time (and often Pro Bowl) Cowboys safety Darren Woodson. Woodson represented the last player link to the Jimmy Johnson Cowboys (and to all three Super Bowl teams of the 1990s). Woodson was on the roster the following season (2004) but never saw action due to injury.

=== Schedule ===
Week	Date	Opponent	Result	Record	Venue	Attendance
1	September 7	Atlanta Falcons	**L** 13–27	0–1	Texas Stadium	64,104
2	September 15	at **New York Giants**	**W** 35–32 (OT)	1–1	Giants Stadium	78,907
3	Bye					
4	September 28	at New York Jets	**W** 17–6	2–1	Giants Stadium	77,863
5	October 5	Arizona Cardinals	**W** 24–7	3–1	Texas Stadium	63,601
6	October 12	**Philadelphia Eagles**	**W** 23–21	4–1	Texas Stadium	63,648
7	October 19	at Detroit Lions	**W** 38–7	5–1	Ford Field	61,160
8	October 26	at Tampa Bay Buccaneers	**L** 0–16	5–2	Raymond James Stadium	65,602
9	November 2	**Washington Redskins**	**W** 21–14	6–2	Texas Stadium	64,002
10	November 9	Buffalo Bills	**W** 10–6	7–2	Texas Stadium	63,770
11	November 16	at New England Patriots	**L** 0–12	7–3	Gillette Stadium	68,436
12	November 23	Carolina Panthers	**W** 24–20	8–3	Texas Stadium	63,871
13	November 27	Miami Dolphins	**L** 21–40	8–4	Texas Stadium	64,110
14	December 7	at **Philadelphia Eagles**	**L** 10–36	8–5	Lincoln Financial Field	69,773
15	December 14	at **Washington Redskins**	**W** 27–0	9–5	FedExField	70,284
16	December 21	**New York Giants**	**W** 19–3	10–5	Texas Stadium	64,118
17	December 28	at New Orleans Saints	**L** 7–13	10–6	Louisiana Superdome	68,451

Note: Intra-division opponents are in bold text.

=== Game summaries ===
==== Week 1 vs. Atlanta Falcons ====
Week 1: Atlanta Falcons at Dallas Cowboys – Game summary

Quarter	1	2	3	4	Total
**Falcons**	3	0	14	10	**27**
Cowboys	7	0	0	6	**13**

at Texas Stadium, Irving, Texas

- Date: September 7
- Game time: 3:15 p.m. CDT
- Game weather: Partly Cloudy Skies, 82 °F (27.8 °C)
- Game attendance: 64,104
- Referee: Mike Carey
- TV announcers (Fox): Joe Buck, Troy Aikman, Cris Collinsworth and Pam Oliver
- Recap, Game Book

Game information

**First quarter**

- ATL – Jay Feely 37-yard field goal, 8:40. Falcons 3–0. **Drive: 10 plays, 56 yards, 6:20.**
- DAL – Aveion Cason 63-yard run (Billy Cundiff kick), 4:25. Cowboys 7–3. **Drive: 3 plays, 71 yards, 1:21.**

**Second quarter**

- No scoring plays

**Third quarter**

- ATL – Warrick Dunn 7-yard pass from Doug Johnson (Jay Feely kick), 11:23. Falcons 10–7. **Drive: 5 plays, 40 yards, 2:04.**
- ATL – Alge Crumpler 41-yard pass from Doug Johnson (Jay Feely kick), 4:02. Falcons 17–7. **Drive: 1 play, 41 yards, 0:10.**

**Fourth quarter**

- ATL – Jay Feely 31-yard field goal, 12:44. Falcons 20–7. **Drive: 8 plays, 33 yards, 4:38.**
- DAL – Joey Galloway 49-yard pass from Quincy Carter (kick blocked), 11:37. Falcons 20–13. **Drive: 3 plays, 78 yards, 1:07.**
- ATL – Doug Johnson 1-yard run (Jay Feely kick), 3:11. Falcons 27–13. **Drive: 13 plays, 75 yards, 8:26.**

Top passers

- ATL – Doug Johnson – 16/27, 228 yards, 2 TD, INT
- DAL – Quincy Carter – 15/32, 268 yards, TD, INT

Top rushers

- ATL – Warrick Dunn – 13 rushes, 41 yards
- DAL – Troy Hambrick – 14 rushes, 53 yards

Top receivers

- ATL – Alge Crumpler – 5 receptions, 94 yards, TD
- DAL – Joey Galloway – 7 receptions, 139 yards, TD

The Bill Parcells era of the Cowboys began inauspiciously in a 27–13 loss to the Falcons at Texas Stadium. With Michael Vick out with injury Doug Johnson started for the Falcons and had two passing touchdowns and a rushing score. Quincy Carter had a touchdown to Joey Galloway and an interception.

==== Week 2 at New York Giants ====
Week 2: Dallas Cowboys at New York Giants – Game summary

Quarter	1	2	3	4	OT	Total
**Cowboys**	7	13	6	6	3	**35**
Giants	7	0	7	18	0	**32**

at Giants Stadium, East Rutherford, New Jersey

- Date: September 15
- Game time: 9:00 p.m. EDT/8:00 p.m. CDT
- Game weather: Rain, 72 °F (22.2 °C)
- Game attendance: 78,907
- Referee: Gerry Austin
- TV announcers (ABC): Al Michaels, John Madden and Lisa Guerrero
- Recap, Game Book

Game information

**First quarter**

- NYG – Ralph Brown 29-yard interception return (Matt Bryant kick), 7:21. Giants 7–0
- DAL – Quincy Carter 8-yard run (Billy Cundiff kick), 3:06. Tied 7–7. **Drive: 7 plays, 53 yards, 4:15.**

**Second quarter**

- DAL – Billy Cundiff 37-yard field goal, 14:12. Cowboys 10–7. **Drive: 6 plays, 16 yards, 2:17.**
- DAL – Billy Cundiff 49-yard field goal, 7:41. Cowboys 13–7. **Drive: 6 plays, 30 yards, 3:26.**
- DAL – Alshermond Singleton 41-yard interception return (Billy Cundiff kick), 3:05. Cowboys 20–7

**Third quarter**

- DAL – Billy Cundiff 42-yard field goal, 11:00. Cowboys 23–7. **Drive: 8 plays, 36 yards, 4:00.**
- NYG – Ike Hilliard 5-yard pass from Kerry Collins (Matt Bryant kick), 8:11. Cowboys 23–14. **Drive: 7 plays, 69 yards, 2:49.**
- DAL – Billy Cundiff 21-yard field goal, 4:53. Cowboys 26–14. **Drive: 6 plays, 69 yards, 3:18.**

**Fourth quarter**

- DAL – Billy Cundiff 36-yard field goal, 12:43. Cowboys 29–14. **Drive: 11 plays, 62 yards, 5:54.**
- NYG – Jeremy Shockey 1-yard pass from Kerry Collins (Matt Bryant kick), 9:54. Cowboys 29–21. **Drive: 6 plays, 69 yards, 2:49.**
- NYG – Amani Toomer 20-yard pass from Kerry Collins (Tiki Barber run), 6:20. Tied 29–29. **Drive: 3 plays, 64 yards, 1:12.**
- NYG – Matt Bryant 30-yard field goal, 0:11. Giants 32–29. **Drive: 9 plays, 40 yards, 2:48.**
- DAL – Billy Cundiff 52-yard field goal, 0:00. Tied 32–32. **Drive: 2 plays, 26 yards, 0:11.**

**Overtime**

- DAL – Billy Cundiff 25-yard field goal, 5:56. Cowboys 35–32. **Drive: 8 plays, 51 yards, 4:13.**

Top passers

- DAL – Quincy Carter – 25/40, 321 yards, INT
- NYG – Kerry Collins – 21/51, 265 yards, 3 TD, 2 INT

Top rushers

- DAL – Troy Hambrick – 23 rushes, 60 yards
- NYG – Tiki Barber – 15 rushes, 41 yards

Top receivers

- DAL – Terry Glenn – 8 receptions, 113 yards
- NYG – Amani Toomer – 7 receptions, 126 yards, TD

On Monday Night Football Bill Parcells returned to Giants Stadium for the first time since his final year as New York Jets coach and the ensuing game against the New York Giants became a memorable struggle. The Cowboys raced to a 23–7 lead as kicker Billy Cundiff proceeded through a huge day, but the Giants behind Kerry Collins erupted, outscoring the Cowboys 25–12 in the second half; the go-ahead Giants score (a 30-yard Matt Bryant field goal) came with eleven seconds left. A penalty on the ensuing kickoff gave Dallas the ball at its own 40 and a 26-yard catch by Antonio Bryant set up Cundiff's sixth field goal of the game, a 52-yarder with no time left. In overtime both teams traded punts before Quincy Carter led the Cowboys to the Giants 6-yard line and Cundiff connected on a seventh field goal and 35–32 win; in that process Cundiff tied Chris Boniol's record from Dallas' 1996 win over the Packers.

==== Week 4 at New York Jets ====
Week 4: Dallas Cowboys at New York Jets – Game summary

Quarter	1	2	3	4	Total
**Cowboys**	0	14	0	3	**17**
Jets	3	0	3	0	**6**

at Giants Stadium, East Rutherford, New Jersey

- Date: September 28
- Game time: 4:15 p.m. EDT/3:15 p.m. CDT
- Game weather: Overcast, 65 °F (18.3 °C)
- Game attendance: 77,863
- Referee: Bernie Kukar
- TV announcers (Fox): Dick Stockton, Daryl Johnston and Chris Myers
- Recap, Game Book

Game information

**First quarter**

- NYJ – Doug Brien 34-yard field goal, 8:57. Jets 3–0. **Drive: 11 plays, 39 yards, 6:03.**

**Second quarter**

- DAL – Troy Hambrick 31-yard run (Billy Cundiff kick), 12:43. Cowboys 7–3. **Drive: 4 plays, 48 yards, 2:09.**
- DAL – Antonio Bryant 13-yard pass from Quincy Carter (Billy Cundiff kick), 0:11. Cowboys 14–3. **Drive: 8 plays, 80 yards, 1:31.**

**Third quarter**

- NYJ – Doug Brien 38-yard field goal, 0:44. Cowboys 14–6. **Drive: 11 plays, 60 yards, 5:51.**

**Fourth quarter**

- DAL – Billy Cundiff 26-yard field goal, 4:56. Cowboys 17–6. **Drive: 11 plays, 87 yards, 6:10.**

Top passers

- DAL – Quincy Carter – 11/23, 165 yards, TD, INT
- NYJ – Vinny Testaverde – 21/29, 219 yards

Top rushers

- DAL – Troy Hambrick – 24 rushes, 127 yards, TD
- NYJ – Curtis Martin – 21 rushes, 64 yards

Top receivers

- DAL – Joey Galloway – 5 receptions, 100 yards
- NYJ – Santana Moss – 5 receptions, 65 yards

Following their bye week the Cowboys returned to the Meadowlands, this time to face Bill Parcells' third former team the Jets. The Cowboys rushed for 202 yards and Troy Hambrick and Antonio Bryant touchdowns in the second quarter were enough as the Cowboys won 17–6. This would be the Cowboys last win on the road against the Jets until 2025.

==== Week 5 vs. Arizona Cardinals ====
Week 5: Arizona Cardinals at Dallas Cowboys – Game summary

Quarter	1	2	3	4	Total
Cardinals	7	0	0	0	**7**
**Cowboys**	7	10	7	0	**24**

at Texas Stadium, Irving, Texas

- Date: October 5
- Game time: 12:00 p.m. CDT
- Game weather: Cloudy Skies, 70 °F (21.1 °C)
- Game attendance: 63,601
- Referee: Pete Morelli
- TV announcers (Fox): Curt Menefee and Tim Green
- Recap, Game Book

Game information

**First quarter**

- DAL – Terry Glenn 51-yard pass from Quincy Carter (Billy Cundiff kick), 3:33. Cowboys 7–0. **Drive: 1 play, 51 yards, 0:08.**
- ARZ – Bryan Gilmore 24-yard pass from Jeff Blake (Tim Duncan kick), 1:52. Tied 7–7. **Drive: 3 plays, 31 yards, 1:41.**

**Second quarter**

- DAL – Richie Anderson 18-yard pass from Quincy Carter (Billy Cundiff kick), 13:48. Cowboys 14–7. **Drive: 6 plays, 66 yards, 3:04.**
- DAL – Billy Cundiff 33-yard field goal, 2:12. Cowboys 17–7. **Drive: 13 plays, 65 yards, 5:48.**

**Third quarter**

- DAL – Billy Cundiff 36-yard field goal, 10:29. Cowboys 20–7. **Drive: 8 plays, 53 yards, 4:31.**
- DAL – Jeff Blake sacked in the end zone by La'Roi Glover for a safety, 6:46. Cowboys 22–7
- DAL – Jeff Blake sacked in the end zone by Kenyon Coleman for a safety, 3:34. Cowboys 24–7

**Fourth quarter**

- No scoring plays

Top passers

- ARZ – Jeff Blake – 14/28, 121 yards, TD, 2 INT
- DAL – Quincy Carter – 20/31, 277 yards, 2 TD, INT

Top rushers

- ARZ – Marcel Shipp – 9 rushes, 31 yards
- DAL – Troy Hambrick – 23 rushes, 59 yards

Top receivers

- ARZ – Freddie Jones – 4 receptions, 39 yards
- DAL – Terry Glenn – 4 receptions, 104 yards, TD

The Cowboys hosted former NFC East foe Arizona; they limited the Cardinals to 151 total yards and sacked Jeff Blake twice in the endzone for a safety, ultimately winning 24–7. Quincy Carter had 277 yards and two touchdowns. Former Cowboy Emmitt Smith was knocked out of the game after failing to record a single yard (he had a net loss of one yard) on six carries and later admitted “i cried for forty five minutes before the game.”

==== Week 6 vs. Philadelphia Eagles ====
Week 6: Philadelphia Eagles at Dallas Cowboys – Game summary

Quarter	1	2	3	4	Total
Eagles	0	7	7	7	**21**
**Cowboys**	7	3	7	6	**23**

at Texas Stadium, Irving, Texas

- Date: October 12
- Game time: 12:00 p.m. CDT
- Game weather: Cloudy Skies, 70 °F (21.1 °C)
- Game attendance: 63,648
- Referee: Ron Blum
- TV announcers (Fox): Sam Rosen and Bill Maas
- Recap, Game Book

Game information

**First quarter**

- DAL – Randal Williams 37-yard kickoff return (Billy Cundiff kick), 14:57. Cowboys 7–0. **Drive: 0 plays, 0 yards, 0:03.**

**Second quarter**

- PHI – Brian Westbrook 5-yard run (David Akers kick), 10:20. Tied 7–7. **Drive: 9 plays, 55 yards, 4:30.**
- DAL – Billy Cundiff 51-yard field goal, 0:12. Cowboys 10–7. **Drive: 5 plays, 18 yards, 1:05.**

**Third quarter**

- DAL – Troy Hambrick 1-yard run (Billy Cundiff kick), 4:00. Cowboys 17–7. **Drive: 11 plays, 80 yards, 6:08.**
- PHI – Duce Staley 52-yard pass from Donovan McNabb (David Akers kick), 2:56. Cowboys 17–14. **Drive: 2 plays, 60 yards, 1:04.**

**Fourth quarter**

- DAL – Billy Cundiff 22-yard field goal, 14:12. Cowboys 20–14. **Drive: 8 plays, 72 yards, 3:44.**
- PHI – Correll Buckhalter 20-yard run (David Akers kick), 4:14. Eagles 21–20. **Drive: 14 plays, 61 yards, 6:45.**
- DAL – Billy Cundiff 28-yard field goal, 1:11. Cowboys 23–21. **Drive: 7 plays, 31 yards, 3:03.**

Top passers

- PHI – Donovan McNabb – 11/26, 126 yards, TD
- DAL – Quincy Carter – 14/25, 146 yards, INT

Top rushers

- PHI – Correll Buckhalter – 11 rushes, 52 yards, TD
- DAL – Troy Hambrick – 18 rushes, 46 yards, TD

Top receivers

- PHI – Duce Staley – 3 receptions, 66 yards, TD
- DAL – Terry Glenn – 5 receptions, 41 yards

The Eagles opened with an onside kick and Randal Williams ran it back for a Dallas touchdown, and became the quickest player to score a touchdown in NFL history, in only 3 seconds. From there the Cowboys raced to a 17–7 lead in the third quarter. But by late in the fourth quarter Duce Staley's 52-yard catch from Donovan McNabb and a Correll Buckhalter score put the Eagles up 21–20. Quincy Carter then completed a 19-yard pass to Joey Galloway; two Troy Hambrick runs set up the go-ahead Cowboys field goal with 1:14 to go; the Cowboys then sacked McNabb and he fumbled to Dallas, ending the game as a 23–21 Dallas win.

==== Week 7 at Detroit Lions ====
Week 7: Dallas Cowboys at Detroit Lions – Game summary

Quarter	1	2	3	4	Total
**Cowboys**	7	21	7	3	**38**
Lions	7	0	0	0	**7**

at Ford Field, Detroit, Michigan

- Date: October 19
- Game time: 1:00 p.m. EDT/12:00 p.m. CDT
- Game weather: None (indoor stadium)
- Game attendance: 61,160
- Referee: Terry McAulay
- TV announcers (Fox): Sam Rosen, Bill Maas and Chris Myers
- Recap, Game Book

Game information

**First quarter**

- DET – Dre Bly 67-yard fumble return (Jason Hanson kick), 8:23. Lions 7–0.
- DAL – Terry Glenn 20-yard pass from Quincy Carter (Billy Cundiff kick), 4:58. Tied 7–7. **Drive: 6 plays, 78 yards, 3:25.**

**Second quarter**

- DAL – Terry Glenn 19-yard pass from Quincy Carter (Billy Cundiff kick), 11:31. Cowboys 14–7. **Drive: 7 plays, 83 yards, 3:18.**
- DAL – Terry Glenn 8-yard pass from Quincy Carter (Billy Cundiff kick), 10:21. Cowboys 21–7. **Drive: 1 play, 8 yards, 0:06.**
- DAL – Mario Edwards 27-yard interception return (Billy Cundiff kick), 4:20. Cowboys 28–7.

**Third quarter**

- DAL – Troy Hambrick 3-yard run (Billy Cundiff kick), 7:33. Cowboys 35–7. **Drive: 14 plays, 81 yards, 7:27.**

**Fourth quarter**

- DAL – Billy Cundiff 23-yard field goal, 14:57. Cowboys 38–7. **Drive: 12 plays, 59 yards, 6:35.**

Top passers

- DAL – Quincy Carter – 18/25, 190 yards, 3 TD
- DET – Mike McMahon – 5/20, 51 yards, INT

Top rushers

- DAL – Troy Hambrick – 24 rushes, 74 yards, TD
- DET – Olandis Gary – 11 rushes, 37 yards

Top receivers

- DAL – Terry Glenn – 6 receptions, 75 yards, 3 TD
- DET – Scotty Anderson – 3 receptions, 27 yards

The Cowboys embarrassed the Lions by scoring the game's final 38 points, with a monster day for Quincy Carter and Terry Glenn, who both hooked up for three touchdowns; Mario Edwards then intercepted Joey Harrington and scored. In the end the Cowboys were 38–7 winners with a 5–1 record; it was also the club's second career win in five tries against Steve Mariucci.

==== Week 8 at Tampa Bay Buccaneers ====
Week 8: Dallas Cowboys at Tampa Bay Buccaneers – Game summary

Quarter	1	2	3	4	Total
Cowboys	0	0	0	0	**0**
**Buccaneers**	0	10	6	0	**16**

at Raymond James Stadium, Tampa, Florida

- Date: October 26
- Game time: 1:00 p.m. EST/12:00 p.m. CST
- Game weather: Partly Cloudy, 82 °F (27.8 °C)
- Game attendance: 65,602
- Referee: Bill Carollo
- TV announcers (Fox): Kenny Albert, Daryl Johnston and Tony Siragusa
- Recap, Game Book

Game information

**First quarter**

- No scoring plays

**Second quarter**

- TB – Martin Gramatica 24-yard field goal, 10:53. Buccaneers 3–0. **Drive: 6 plays, 18 yards, 3:18.**
- TB – Keyshawn Johnson 7-yard pass from Brad Johnson (Martin Gramatica kick), 4:13. Buccaneers 10–0. **Drive: 8 plays, 78 yards, 4:30.**

**Third quarter**

- TB – Martin Gramatica 26-yard field goal, 9:24. Buccaneers 13–0. **Drive: 6 plays, 13 yards, 2:14.**
- TB – Martin Gramatica 50-yard field goal, 2:03. Buccaneers 16–0. **Drive: 9 plays, 41 yards, 4:43.**

**Fourth quarter**

- No scoring plays

Top passers

- DAL – Quincy Carter – 15/25, 140 yards, 2 INT
- TB – Brad Johnson – 13/26, 151 yards, TD

Top rushers

- DAL – Troy Hambrick – 11 rushes, 25 yards
- TB – Michael Pittman – 30 rushes, 113 yards

Top receivers

- DAL – Aveion Cason – 3 receptions, 40 yards
- TB – Keenan McCardell – 6 receptions, 68 yards

The embattled Buccaneers shut out the Cowboys 16–0 as Keyshawn Johnson caught a touchdown pass while Quincy Carter was intercepted twice.

==== Week 9 vs. Washington Redskins ====
Week 9: Washington Redskins at Dallas Cowboys – Game summary

Quarter	1	2	3	4	Total
Redskins	6	0	0	8	**14**
**Cowboys**	0	7	7	7	**21**

at Texas Stadium, Irving, Texas

- Date: November 2
- Game time: 3:15 p.m. CST
- Game weather: Cloudy Skies, 79 °F (26.1 °C)
- Game attendance: 64,002
- Referee: Larry Nemmers
- TV announcers (Fox): Joe Buck, Troy Aikman, Cris Collinsworth and Pam Oliver
- Recap, Game Book

Game information

**First quarter**

- WSH – Laveranues Coles 7-yard pass from Patrick Ramsey (kick blocked), 8:37. Redskins 7–0. **Drive: 2 plays, 6 yards, 0:40.**

**Second quarter**

- DAL – Troy Hambrick 2-yard run (Billy Cundiff kick), 7:06. Tied 7–7. **Drive: 11 plays, 75 yards, 5:17.**

**Third quarter**

- DAL – Troy Hambrick 1-yard run (Billy Cundiff kick), 6:45. Cowboys 14–7. **Drive: 10 plays, 48 yards, 5:03.**

**Fourth quarter**

- DAL – Terry Glenn 19-yard pass from Quincy Carter (Billy Cundiff kick), 11:21. Cowboys 21–7. **Drive: 14 plays, 91 yards, 7:18.**
- WSH – Taylor Jacobs 19-yard pass from Patrick Ramsey (Patrick Ramsey–Darnerien McCants), 2:30. Cowboys 21–14. **Drive: 8 plays, 81 yards, 2:56.**

Top passers

- WSH – Patrick Ramsey – 16/30, 147 yards, 2 TD
- DAL – Quincy Carter – 17/33, 196 yards, TD, 2 INT

Top rushers

- WSH – Rock Cartwright – 8 rushes, 44 yards
- DAL – Troy Hambrick – 21 rushes, 100 yards, 2 TD

Top receivers

- WSH – Patrick Johnson – 3 receptions, 55 yards
- DAL – Terry Glenn – 6 receptions, 73 yards, TD

The Cowboys ended 3 years of never winning more than 5 games in a season by beating the Redskins, 21–14 at home and improving to 6–2.

==== Week 10 vs. Buffalo Bills ====
Week 10: Buffalo Bills at Dallas Cowboys – Game summary

Quarter	1	2	3	4	Total
Bills	0	6	0	0	**6**
**Cowboys**	7	0	3	0	**10**

at Texas Stadium, Irving, Texas

- Date: November 9
- Game time: 3:15 p.m. CST
- Game weather: Partly Cloudy Skies, 55 °F (12.8 °C)
- Game attendance: 63,770
- Referee: Bill Leavy
- TV announcers (CBS): Greg Gumbel, Phil Simms and Armen Keteyian
- Recap, Game Book

Game information

**First quarter**

- DAL – Dan Campbell 2-yard pass from Quincy Carter (Billy Cundiff kick), 0:19. Cowboys 7–0. **Drive: 5 plays, 24 yards, 2:22.**

**Second quarter**

- BUF – Rian Lindell 41-yard field goal, 10:47. Cowboys 7–3. **Drive: 10 plays, 46 yards, 4:32.**
- BUF – Rian Lindell 29-yard field goal, 0:29. Cowboys 7–6. **Drive: 9 plays, 69 yards, 1:28.**

**Third quarter**

- DAL – Billy Cundiff 51-yard field goal, 13:05. Cowboys 10–6. **Drive: 5 plays, 23 yards, 1:55.**

**Fourth quarter**

- No scoring plays

Top passers

- BUF – Drew Bledsoe – 17/34, 104 yards
- DAL – Quincy Carter – 15/32, 116 yards, TD

Top rushers

- BUF – Travis Henry – 21 rushes, 80 yards
- DAL – Adrian Murrell – 16 rushes, 76 yards

Top receivers

- BUF – Eric Moulds – 5 receptions, 32 yards
- DAL – Jason Witten – 3 receptions, 24 yards

Bill Parcells faced his once and future quarterback Drew Bledsoe as the 4–4 Bills came to Dallas. Bledsoe managed just two drives ending in field goals while the Cowboys were only slightly better, managing a two-yard Quincy Carter touchdown for the 10–6 Cowboys win.

==== Week 11 at New England Patriots ====
Week 11: Dallas Cowboys at New England Patriots – Game summary

Quarter	1	2	3	4	Total
Cowboys	0	0	0	0	**0**
**Patriots**	3	6	0	3	**12**

at Gillette Stadium, Foxborough, Massachusetts

- Date: November 16
- Game time: 8:30 p.m. EST/7:30 p.m. CST
- Game weather: Cloudy and Calm, 33 °F (0.6 °C)
- Game attendance: 68,436
- Referee: Tom White
- TV announcers (ESPN): Mike Patrick, Joe Theismann, Paul Maguire and Suzy Kolber
- Recap, Game Book

Game information

**First quarter**

- NE – Adam Vinatieri 23-yard field goal, 3:05. Patriots 3–0. **Drive: 10 plays, 70 yards, 3:38.**

**Second quarter**

- NE – Antowain Smith 2-yard run (kick blocked), 2:34. Patriots 9–0. **Drive: 6 plays, 80 yards, 2:22.**

**Third quarter**

- No scoring plays

**Fourth quarter**

- NE – Adam Vinatieri 26-yard field goal, 1:56. Patriots 12–0. **Drive: 9 plays, 36 yards, 5:28.**

Top passers

- DAL – Quincy Carter – 20/36, 210 yards, 3 INT
- NE – Tom Brady – 15/34, 212 yards

Top rushers

- DAL – Troy Hambrick – 16 rushes, 41 yards
- NE – Antowain Smith – 16 rushes, 51 yards, TD

Top receivers

- DAL – Richie Anderson – 8 receptions, 85 yards
- NE – Deion Branch – 2 receptions, 69 yards

Parcells traveled to Foxboro for the first time since the 1999 season and faced his former assistant Bill Belichick on Sunday night. The Patriots had won five straight and made it six as they sacked Quincy Carter once and intercepted three passes. Former Patriot Terry Glenn was held to one catch as the Patriots ground out a 12–0 win.

==== Week 12 vs. Carolina Panthers ====
Week 12: Carolina Panthers at Dallas Cowboys – Game summary

Quarter	1	2	3	4	Total
Panthers	3	7	7	3	**20**
**Cowboys**	10	0	14	0	**24**

at Texas Stadium, Irving, Texas

- Date: November 23
- Game time: 12:00 p.m. CST
- Game weather: Cloudy Skies, 44 °F (6.7 °C)
- Game attendance: 63,871
- Referee: Ed Hochuli
- TV announcers (Fox): Joe Buck, Troy Aikman, Cris Collinsworth and Pam Oliver
- Recap, Game Book

Game information

**First quarter**

- DAL – Billy Cundiff 24-yard field goal, 12:34. Cowboys 3–0. **Drive: 6 plays, 12 yards, 2:21.**
- CAR – John Kasay 44-yard field goal, 4:47. Tied 3–3. **Drive: 6 plays, 20 yards, 3:22.**
- DAL – Joey Galloway 24-yard pass from Quincy Carter (Billy Cundiff kick), 1:50. Cowboys 10–3. **Drive: 6 plays, 51 yards, 2:57.**

**Second quarter**

- CAR – Stephen Davis 1-yard run (John Kasay kick), 2:09. Tied 10–10. **Drive: 5 plays, 71 yards, 2:22.**

**Third quarter**

- DAL – Jeff Robinson 5-yard pass from Quincy Carter (Billy Cundiff kick), 9:26. Cowboys 17–10. **Drive: 2 plays, 11 yards, 0:43.**
- CAR – Brad Hoover 1-yard pass from Jake Delhomme (John Kasay kick), 7:27. Tied 17–17. **Drive: 4 plays, 65 yards, 1:59.**
- DAL – Aveion Cason 16-yard run (Billy Cundiff kick), 4:15. Cowboys 24–17. **Drive: 6 plays, 63 yards, 3:12.**

**Fourth quarter**

- CAR – John Kasay 34-yard field goal, 3:47. Cowboys 24–20. **Drive: 7 plays, 50 yards, 2:16.**

Top passers

- CAR – Jake Delhomme – 9/24, 175 yards, TD, INT
- DAL – Quincy Carter – 29/43, 254 yards, 2 TD, INT

Top rushers

- CAR – Stephen Davis – 26 rushes, 59 yards, TD
- DAL – Aveion Cason – 6 rushes, 26 yards, TD

Top receivers

- CAR – Steve Smith – 4 receptions, 73 yards
- DAL – Terry Glenn – 5 receptions, 74 yards

The Cowboys hosted the surging Panthers and the game lead tied or changed six times. Joey Galloway caught a touchdown, one of two from Quincy Carter, while Aveion Cason's touchdown put Dallas up 24–17. John Kasay's field goal at 3:51 to go made it 24–20 late in the fourth, but the Cowboys killed the remaining clock on four Quincy Carter completions for 21 yards and a four-yard run aided by a Deon Grant personal foul penalty.

==== Thanksgiving Day vs. Miami Dolphins ====
Week 13: Miami Dolphins at Dallas Cowboys – Game summary

Quarter	1	2	3	4	Total
**Dolphins**	7	16	14	3	**40**
Cowboys	0	14	0	7	**21**

at Texas Stadium, Irving, Texas

- Date: November 27
- Game time: 3:00 p.m. CST
- Game weather: Partly Cloudy Skies, 60 °F (15.6 °C)
- Game attendance: 64,110
- Referee: Pete Morelli
- TV announcers (CBS): Greg Gumbel, Phil Simms and Armen Keteyian
- Recap, Game Book

Game information

**First quarter**

- MIA – Jay Fiedler 1-yard run (Olindo Mare kick), 10:24. Dolphins 7–0. **Drive: 8 plays, 67 yards, 4:36.**

**Second quarter**

- MIA – Olindo Mare 33-yard field goal, 14:24. Dolphins 10–0. **Drive: 10 plays, 51 yards, 5:26.**
- DAL – Richie Anderson 4-yard run (Billy Cundiff kick), 10:19. Dolphins 10–7. **Drive: 9 plays, 66 yards, 4:05.**
- MIA – Chris Chambers 39-yard pass from Jay Fiedler (Olindo Mare kick), 8:04. Dolphins 17–7. **Drive: 4 plays, 72 yards, 2:15.**
- DAL – Richie Anderson 27-yard pass from Quincy Carter (Billy Cundiff kick), 2:44. Dolphins 17–14. **Drive: 10 plays, 80 yards, 5:20.**
- MIA – Chris Chambers 6-yard pass from Jay Fiedler (kick blocked), 0:10. Dolphins 23–14. **Drive: 10 plays, 75 yards, 2:34.**

**Third quarter**

- MIA – Jason Taylor 34-yard fumble return (Olindo Mare kick), 13:17. Dolphins 30–14.
- MIA – Chris Chambers 35-yard pass from Jay Fiedler (Olindo Mare kick), 7:42. Dolphins 37–14. **Drive: 2 plays, 40 yards, 0:48.**

**Fourth quarter**

- MIA – Olindo Mare 42-yard field goal, 13:57. Dolphins 40–14. **Drive: 6 plays, 26 yards, 2:51.**
- DAL – Antonio Bryant 18-yard pass from Quincy Carter (Billy Cundiff kick), 12:22. Dolphins 40–21. **Drive: 4 plays, 73 yards, 1:35.**

Top passers

- MIA – Jay Fiedler – 16/20, 239 yards, 3 TD
- DAL – Quincy Carter – 24/40, 288 yards, 2 TD, 3 INT

Top rushers

- MIA – Ricky Williams – 31 rushes, 104 yards
- DAL – Quincy Carter – 4 rushes, 42 yards

Top receivers

- MIA – Chris Chambers – 5 receptions, 96 yards, 3 TD
- DAL – Terry Glenn – 4 receptions, 97 yards

The 8–3 Cowboys hosted the 7–4 Dolphins for the first time since 1999. The two teams had clashed in memorable contests in 1993 and 1996 and both were in the thick of their playoff races. The second quarter became a frantic affair following a first quarter score by Jay Fiedler. The Dolphins erupted to outscore Dallas 23–14 in the second, and from there the game merely awaited its obsequies on two more Miami touchdowns (one a strip-sack of Quincy Carter run back by Jason Taylor) and a Carter score to Antonio Bryant. The Dolphins finished up 40–21 winners, and both teams faced key division matchups at 8–4.

==== Week 14 at Philadelphia Eagles ====
Week 14: Dallas Cowboys at Philadelphia Eagles – Game summary

Quarter	1	2	3	4	Total
Cowboys	3	7	0	0	**10**
**Eagles**	0	10	9	17	**36**

at Lincoln Financial Field, Philadelphia, Pennsylvania

- Date: December 7
- Game time: 1:00 p.m. EST/12:00 p.m. CST
- Game weather: Partly Cloudy, 30 °F (−1.1 °C)
- Game attendance: 69,773
- Referee: Gerry Austin
- TV announcers (Fox): Joe Buck, Troy Aikman, Cris Collinsworth and Pam Oliver
- Recap, Game Book

Game information

**First quarter**

- DAL – Billy Cundiff 29-yard field goal, 3:43. Cowboys 3–0. **Drive: 6 plays, 34 yards, 2:58.**

**Second quarter**

- PHI – David Akers 22-yard field goal, 14:56. Tied 3–3. **Drive: 8 plays, 65 yards, 3:47.**
- PHI – Brian Westbrook 16-yard pass from Donovan McNabb (David Akers kick), 3:15. Eagles 10–3. **Drive: 7 plays, 79 yards, 4:01.**
- DAL – Jeff Robinson 3-yard pass from Quincy Carter (Billy Cundiff kick), 0:26. Tied 10–10. **Drive: 7 plays, 61 yards, 2:49.**

**Third quarter**

- PHI – Duce Staley 5-yard pass from Donovan McNabb (David Akers kick), 12:25. Eagles 17–10. **Drive: 5 plays, 27 yards, 1:03.**
- PHI – Matt Lehr fumble out of bounds in end zone for safety, 2:25. Eagles 19–10

**Fourth quarter**

- PHI – L. J. Smith 6-yard pass from Donovan McNabb (David Akers kick), 12:52. Eagles 26–10. **Drive: 8 plays, 68 yards, 4:33.**
- PHI – David Akers 21-yard field goal, 6:06. Eagles 29–10. **Drive: 9 plays, 68 yards, 4:57.**
- PHI – Correll Buckhalter 64-yard run (David Akers kick), 1:47. Eagles 36–10. **Drive: 2 plays, 72 yards, 0:19.**

Top passers

- DAL – Quincy Carter – 15/24, 93 yards, TD, 2 INT
- PHI – Donovan McNabb – 18/34, 240 yards, 3 TD

Top rushers

- DAL – Troy Hambrick – 17 rushes, 75 yards
- PHI – Correll Buckhalter – 13 rushes, 115 yards, TD

Top receivers

- DAL – Jason Witten – 3 receptions, 35 yards
- PHI – Freddie Mitchell – 3 receptions, 58 yards

The Eagles all but locked up the NFC East by crushing the Cowboys 36–10. They intercepted Quincy Carter twice and forced a fumble through the endzone for a safety. Donovan McNabb had three touchdown throws despite a failed fourth-down attempt in the fourth quarter, and Correll Buckhalter (144 combined yards from scrimmage) finished the game on a 64-yard touchdown run.

==== Week 15 at Washington Redskins ====
Week 15: Dallas Cowboys at Washington Redskins – Game summary

Quarter	1	2	3	4	Total
**Cowboys**	7	7	3	10	**27**
Redskins	0	0	0	0	**0**

at FedExField, Landover, Maryland

- Date: December 14
- Game time: 4:15 p.m. EST/3:15 p.m. CST
- Game weather: Rain, 36 °F (2.2 °C)
- Game attendance: 70,284
- Referee: Bernie Kukar
- TV announcers (Fox): Dick Stockton, Daryl Johnston and Tony Siragusa
- Recap, Game Book

Game information

**First quarter**

- DAL – Richie Anderson 21-yard pass from Quincy Carter (Billy Cundiff kick), 9:26. Cowboys 7–0. **Drive: 10 plays, 74 yards, 5:34.**

**Second quarter**

- DAL – Quincy Carter 3-yard run (Billy Cundiff kick), 1:52. Cowboys 14–0. **Drive: 3 plays, 9 yards, 0:14.**

**Third quarter**

- DAL – Billy Cundiff 34-yard field goal, 4:34. Cowboys 17–0. **Drive: 5 plays, 16 yards, 1:46.**

**Fourth quarter**

- DAL – Billy Cundiff 20-yard field goal, 9:16. Cowboys 20–0. **Drive: 11 plays, 51 yards, 5:49.**
- DAL – Erik Bickerstaff 2-yard run (Billy Cundiff kick), 4:05. Cowboys 27–0. **Drive: 3 plays, 53 yards, 1:37.**

Top passers

- DAL – Quincy Carter – 10/24, 108 yards, TD
- WSH – Tim Hasselbeck – 6/26, 56 yards, 4 INT

Top rushers

- DAL – Troy Hambrick – 33 rushes, 189 yards
- WSH – Rock Cartwright – 21 rushes, 94 yards

Top receivers

- DAL – Richie Anderson – 5 receptions, 51 yards, TD
- WSH – Rod Gardner – 3 receptions, 24 yards

On a dismal day for quarterbacking (Quincy Carter, Brian Barker, and Tim Hasselbeck combined for just 16 of 50 passes for 164 yards and a Carter touchdown for an average passer rating of just 75) Troy Hambrick exploded to 189 rushing yards as Dallas shut out the Redskins 27–0.

==== Week 16 vs. New York Giants ====
Week 16: New York Giants at Dallas Cowboys – Game summary

Quarter	1	2	3	4	Total
Giants	3	0	0	0	**3**
**Cowboys**	10	3	3	3	**19**

at Texas Stadium, Irving, Texas

- Date: December 21
- Game time: 12:00 p.m. CST
- Game weather: Partly Cloudy Skies, 57 °F (13.9 °C)
- Game attendance: 64,118
- Referee: Mike Carey
- TV announcers (Fox): Dick Stockton, Daryl Johnston and Tony Siragusa
- Recap, Game Book

Game information

**First quarter**

- DAL – Billy Cundiff 24-yard field goal, 12:52. Cowboys 3–0. **Drive: 5 plays, 62 yards, 2:08.**
- NYG – Matt Bryant 45-yard field goal, 9:03. Tied 3–3. **Drive: 9 plays, 45 yards, 3:49.**
- DAL – Jason Witten 36-yard pass from Quincy Carter (Billy Cundiff kick), 2:22. Cowboys 10–3. **Drive: 6 plays, 86 yards, 3:06.**

**Second quarter**

- DAL – Billy Cundiff 42-yard field goal, 0:00. Cowboys 13–3. **Drive: 5 plays, 14 yards, 0:26.**

**Third quarter**

- DAL – Billy Cundiff 21-yard field goal, 10:03. Cowboys 16–3. **Drive: 6 plays, 19 yards, 3:17.**

**Fourth quarter**

- DAL – Billy Cundiff 49-yard field goal, 11:23. Cowboys 19–3. **Drive: 13 plays, 52 yards, 6:44.**

Top passers

- NYG – Jesse Palmer – 18/32, 190 yards
- DAL – Quincy Carter – 17/25, 240 yards, TD

Top rushers

- NYG – Tiki Barber – 13 rushes, 47 yards
- DAL – Troy Hambrick – 12 rushes, 36 yards, TD

Top receivers

- NYG – Amani Toomer – 5 receptions, 66 yards
- DAL – Terry Glenn – 5 receptions, 64 yards

Carter got back in groove with 240 yards and a touchdown as four Billy Cundiff field goals (for an aggregate of eleven vs. the Giants in the season) aided a 19–3 Dallas win over the Giants. Dallas now stood in a three-way race for the NFC Wild Cards with the Seahawks and Green Bay Packers. However, because Dallas owned a tiebreaker with Green Bay by virtue of conference record in the event that the Cowboys lost and both the Packers and Vikings won (who were both vying for the NFC North in which the Vikings were leading at the time via a divisional tiebreaker), Dallas had clinched at playoff berth regardless of whether or not the Seahawks were involved in a tie with the Cowboys and Packers. In addition, the Cowboys still had an outside chance at winning the NFC East and a first-round bye with a win and an Eagles' loss the following week. The Cowboys swept the Giants for the first time since 1998.

==== Week 17 at New Orleans Saints ====
Week 17: Dallas Cowboys at New Orleans Saints – Game summary

Quarter	1	2	3	4	Total
Cowboys	0	7	0	0	**7**
**Saints**	3	7	3	0	**13**

at Louisiana Superdome, New Orleans, Louisiana

- Date: December 28
- Game time: 12:00 p.m. CST
- Game weather: None (indoor stadium)
- Game attendance: 68,451
- Referee: Larry Nemmers
- TV announcers (Fox): Joe Buck, Troy Aikman, Cris Collinsworth and Pam Oliver
- Recap, Game Book

Game information

**First quarter**

- NO – John Carney 24-yard field goal, 7:01. Saints 3–0. **Drive: 16 plays, 59 yards, 7:59.**

**Second quarter**

- DAL – Richie Anderson 3-yard pass from Quincy Carter (Billy Cundiff kick), 8:50. Cowboys 7–3. **Drive: 16 plays, 93 yards, 8:32.**
- NO – Donte Stallworth 76-yard pass from Aaron Brooks (John Carney kick), 8:23. Saints 10–7. **Drive: 1 play, 81 yards, 0:27.**

**Third quarter**

- NO – John Carney 27-yard field goal, 11:57. Saints 13–7. **Drive: 7 plays, 31 yards, 2:43.**

**Fourth quarter**

- No scoring plays

Top passers

- DAL – Quincy Carter – 27/47, 290 yards, TD, 3 INT
- NO – Aaron Brooks – 15/32, 243 yards, TD

Top rushers

- DAL – Troy Hambrick – 11 rushes, 26 yards
- NO – Deuce McAllister – 21 rushes, 49 yards

Top receivers

- DAL – Richie Anderson – 10 receptions, 83 yards, TD
- NO – Donte Stallworth – 3 receptions, 114 yards, TD

Entering their last game of the regular season, the Cowboys were aware that the Eagles had defeated the Redskins the previous day, rendering the final week of the regular season meaningful in deciding whether Dallas would finish as the #5 or #6 seed prior to a road wild-card playoff game. A win would lock Dallas into the #5 seed. The Saints were still smarting from a shocking series of laterals ending in a touchdown and missed PAT against Jacksonville the week before. They responded by intercepting Quincy Carter three times and shutting out the Cowboys the remaining two quarters for the 13–7 Saints win. The Seahawks' win the previous day and various results in the final week of the regular season dropped the Cowboys to the sixth seed in the NFC as Seattle held the strength of victory tiebreaker.

=== Standings ===
NFC East
	W	L	T	PCT	DIV	CONF	PF	PA	STK
^{(1)} Philadelphia Eagles	12	4	0	.750	5–1	9–3	374	287	W1
^{(6)} Dallas Cowboys	10	6	0	.625	5–1	8–4	289	260	L1
Washington Redskins	5	11	0	.313	1–5	3–9	287	372	L3
New York Giants	4	12	0	.250	1–5	3–9	243	387	L8

== Postseason ==
=== Wild Card Playoff at Carolina Panthers ===
NFC Wild Card Playoffs: (6) Dallas Cowboys at (3) Carolina Panthers – Game summary

Quarter	1	2	3	4	Total
Cowboys	0	3	0	7	10
Panthers	6	10	7	6	29

at Ericsson Stadium, Charlotte, North Carolina

- Date: January 3
- Game time: 8:00 p.m. EST/7:00 p.m. CST
- Game weather: Partly Cloudy, 63 °F (17.2 °C)
- Game attendance: 73,014
- Referee: Walt Coleman
- TV announcers (ABC): Al Michaels, John Madden and Lisa Guerrero
- Recap, Game Book

Game information

First quarter

- CAR – John Kasay 18-yard field goal, 8:40. Panthers 3–0. Drive: 7 plays, 77 yards, 3:47.
- CAR – John Kasay 38-yard field goal, 1:02. Panthers 6–0. Drive: 7 plays, 21 yards, 1:57.

Second quarter

- CAR – Stephen Davis 23-yard run (John Kasay kick), 6:10. Panthers 13–0. Drive: 8 plays, 51 yards, 3:49.
- DAL – Billy Cundiff 37-yard field goal, 1:12. Panthers 13–3. Drive: 10 plays, 59 yards, 4:58.
- CAR – John Kasay 19-yard field goal, 0:01. Panthers 16–3. Drive: 6 plays, 71 yards, 1:11.

Third quarter

- CAR – Steve Smith 32-yard pass from Jake Delhomme (John Kasay kick), 9:44. Panthers 23–3. Drive: 4 plays, 63 yards, 1:28.

Fourth quarter

- CAR – John Kasay 32-yard field goal, 12:45. Panthers 26–3. Drive: 10 plays, 46 yards, 5:43.
- DAL – Quincy Carter 9-yard run (Billy Cundiff kick), 7:36. Panthers 26–10. Drive: 9 plays, 47 yards, 5:09.
- CAR – John Kasay 34-yard field goal, 3:12. Panthers 29–10. Drive: 4 plays, -5 yards, 1:47.

Top passers

- DAL – Quincy Carter – 21/36, 154 yards, INT
- CAR – Jake Delhomme – 18/29, 273 yards, TD

Top rushers

- DAL – Quincy Carter – 4 rushes, 25 yards, TD
- CAR – Stephen Davis – 26 ruses, 104 yards, TD

Top receivers

- DAL – Joey Galloway – 4 receptions, 59 yards
- CAR – Steve Smith – 5 receptions, 135 yards, TD

For the first time since 1996 the Cowboys faced the Carolina Panthers in the postseason. It was also the first playoff game for Parcells since the 1998 AFC Championship Game. The result, though, was an ugly 29–10 curtain on the season as the Panthers forced a fumble, picked off Quincy Carter once, sacked him three times, and limited the Cowboys to 204 yards of offense. Carter accounted for roughly a third of Dallas' rushing production with 25 yards on the ground (one of them on a rushing touchdown, the only touchdown for Dallas in the game), but finished with a passer rating of 56.9, compared to the 104.5 put up by Panthers quarterback Jake Delhomme.

== Publications ==
- The Football Encyclopedia ISBN 0-312-11435-4
- Total Football ISBN 0-06-270170-3
- Cowboys Have Always Been My Heroes ISBN 0-446-51950-2
