= 2000 Dallas Cowboys season =

NFL team season

- Owner: Jerry Jones
- General manager: Jerry Jones
- Head coach: Dave Campo
- Home stadium: Texas Stadium

Results
- Record: 5–11
- Division place: 4th NFC East
- Playoffs: Did not qualify
- All-Pros: Larry Allen (1st team)
- Pro Bowlers: G Larry Allen

Uniform
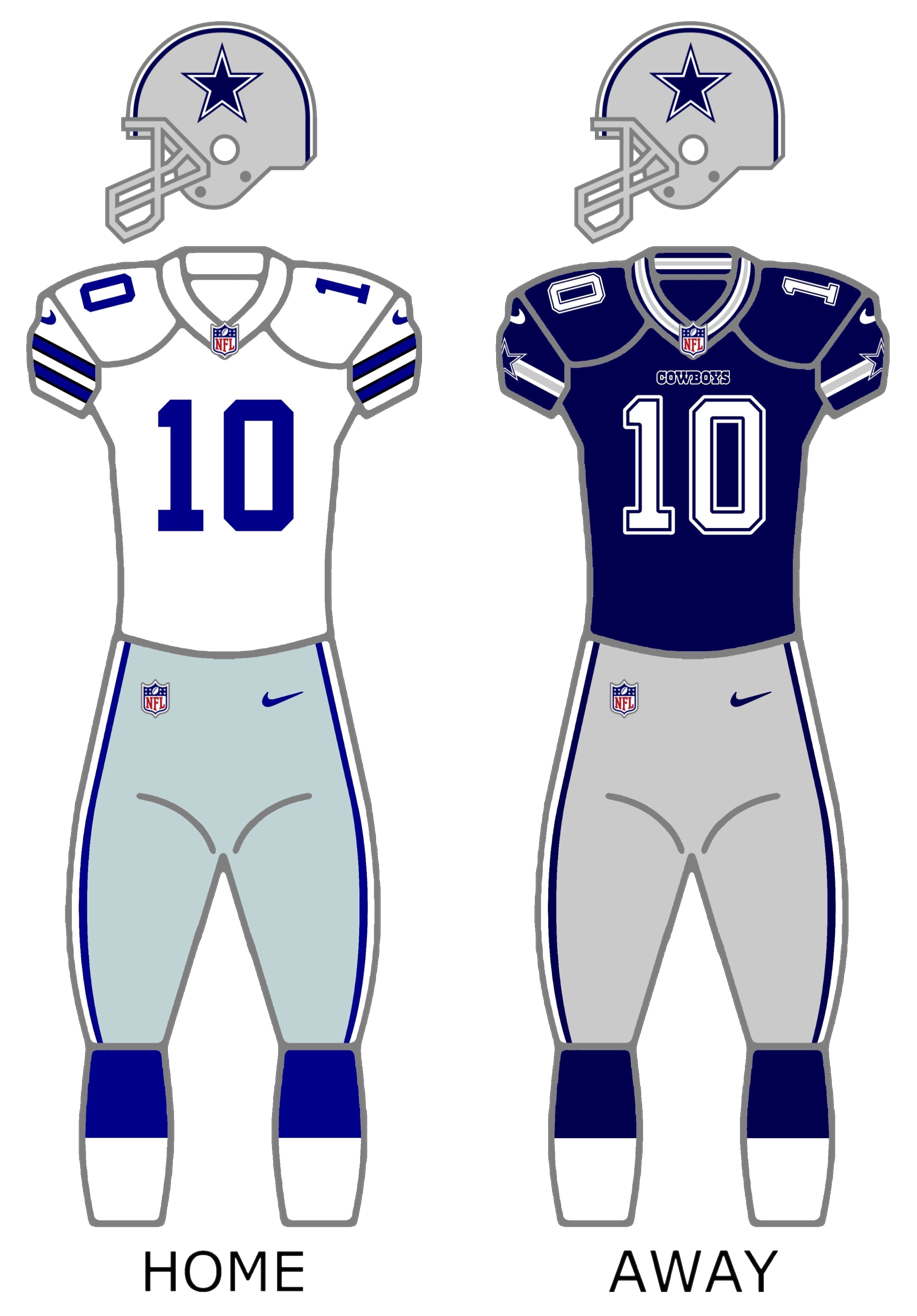

The 2000 season was the Dallas Cowboys' 41st in the National Football League (NFL). Cowboys owner Jerry Jones promoted the team's long-time defensive coordinator, Dave Campo, to be the fifth head coach of the Dallas Cowboys. For the first time since 1987, Michael Irvin was not on the opening day roster. This was also Troy Aikman's last season with the team.

== Offseason ==
The loss of star wide receiver Michael Irvin to retirement led Jerry Jones to trade the team's first round pick in the 2000 draft and the 2001 draft to the Seattle Seahawks for wide receiver Joey Galloway. Pro Bowl cornerback Deion Sanders was also released after five seasons with the team. He later signed with the Cowboys' NFC East division rival Washington Redskins. Fullback Daryl Johnston also retired after the 1999 season.

Additions	Subtractions
LB Joe Bowden (Titans)	WR Michael Irvin (retirement)
QB Randall Cunningham (Vikings)	CB Deion Sanders (Redskins)
WR Joey Galloway (Seahawks)	LB Randall Godfrey (Titans)
TE Jackie Harris (Titans)	LB Lemanski Hall (Vikings)
CB Ryan McNeil (Browns)	CB Kevin Mathis (Saints)
LB Barron Wortham (Titans)	FB Daryl Johnston (retirement)
CB Phillippi Sparks (Giants)	TE Eric Bjornson (Patriots)
	G Everett McIver (Falcons)
	FB Robert Chancey (Chargers)
	G Tom Myslinski (Steelers)
	P Toby Gowin (Saints)
	QB Mike Quinn (Dolphins)
	WR Jeff Ogden (Dolphins)
	DE Kavika Pittman (Broncos)
	CB Wendell Davis (CFL)
	SS Singor Mobley (CFL)

=== 2000 draft class ===
2000 Dallas Cowboys draft
Round	Pick	Player	Position	College	Notes
2	49	Dwayne Goodrich	CB	Tennessee	
4	109	Kareem Larrimore	CB	West Texas A&M	
5	144	Michael Wiley	RB	Ohio State	
6	180	Mario Edwards	CB	Florida State	
7	219	Orantes Grant	LB	Georgia	
Made roster † Pro Football Hall of Fame * Made at least one Pro Bowl during career

Notes

- The Cowboys traded their 2000 and 2001 first-round selections to the Seattle Seahawks for wide receiver Joey Galloway.
- The Cowboys traded their third-round selection to the Seattle Seahawks for wide receiver James McKnight.

=== Undrafted free agents ===
2000 undrafted free agents of note
Player	Position	College
Adam Edwards	Safety	Oklahoma State
Aaron Fields	Defensive end	Tory State
Troy Hambrick	Fullback	Savannah State
Damon Hodge	Wide receiver	Alabama State
Alcender Jackson	Guard	LSU
Sean Key	Safety	Florida State
Micah Knorr	Punter	Utah State
Rian Lindell	Kicker	Washington State
Tony Ortiz	Linebacker	Nebraska
Phillip Rogers	Running back	Georgia Tech
Tim Seder	Kicker	Ashland
Clint Stoerner	Quarterback	Arkansas

== Preseason ==
Week	Date	Opponent	Result	Record	Venue
1	July 30	Pittsburgh Steelers	L 10–38	0–1	Texas Stadium
2	August 5	vs. Atlanta Falcons	L 9–20	0–2	(Japan) Tokyo Dome (Tokyo)
3	August 13	Oakland Raiders	L 20–21	0–3	Texas Stadium
4	August 19	at Denver Broncos	L 23–36	0–4	Mile High Stadium
5	August 24	St. Louis Rams	L 17–24	0–5	Texas Stadium

== Regular season ==
After a lackluster draft which saw the team draft three cornerbacks to replace the departure of star cornerback Deion Sanders, the Dave Campo head coaching era had an inauspicious start with an embarrassing blow-out defeat to the Philadelphia Eagles at home (in which the Eagles recovered an onside kick on the opening kickoff). The loss proved to be even more costly as quarterback Troy Aikman suffered a serious concussion early in the game and newly acquired wide receiver Joey Galloway suffered a season-ending injury in the fourth quarter.

New faces like veteran quarterback Randall Cunningham and wide receiver James McKnight filled in on offense under new offensive coordinator Jack Reilly. On defense, the loss of both starting cornerbacks in the off-season required the addition of veterans Phillipi Sparks and Ryan McNeil. Combined with perennial Pro Bowl safety Darren Woodson, the Cowboys fielded one of the NFL's best secondaries. Unfortunately, a leaky run defense and an inconsistent, aging offense led to a 5–11 record.

In a blow-out loss to the San Francisco 49ers, then controversial 49ers wide receiver Terrell Owens caused an uproar by celebrating a touchdown on the large Cowboys star at midfield in Texas Stadium, prompting anger and resentment off the field. This prompted a retaliation by running back Emmitt Smith with a famous "Defend the Star" kneel-down celebration of his own on the star. When Owens scored his second touchdown and promptly celebrated in midfield once more, then-safety George Teague knocked Owens off and a short brawl ensued on the field. Owens immediately returned to the star to celebrate while the brawl ensued. Teague was ejected from the game, and Terrell Owens was suspended for the next game. Ironically, Owens became a Cowboy later in his career.

A lowlight of the season for Troy Aikman came in week 7 in a game vs The New York Giants at Giants Stadium. Aikman threw five interceptions.

Emmitt Smith's tenth consecutive 1,000-yard season (an NFL record), along with a season sweep of the rival Washington Redskins, proved to be the only highlights in an otherwise disappointing season.

The Cowboys finished 31st in the league in run defense that season, allowing 164.8 yards per game and 4.9 yards per carry.

Notable additions to the team include future starting cornerback Mario Edwards, as well as Dwayne Goodrich. Goodrich gained notoriety after being involved in a hit and run accident which resulted in the deaths of two people. He was subsequently convicted of criminally negligent homicide.

Backup running back Chris Warren was released after a 27–7 loss to the Tampa Bay Buccaneers. Warren tipped a pass which was intercepted by Brian Kelly and returned for a touchdown. After the play Warren was benched, he exchanged words with assistant coaches and spent the rest of the game on the sideline sulking. He was released a few days later and was replaced by rookie Michael Wiley, Warren would eventually sign with the Philadelphia Eagles for the remainder of the season.

=== Schedule ===
Week	Date	Opponent	Result	Record	Venue	Attendance
1	September 3	**Philadelphia Eagles**	**L** 14–41	0–1	Texas Stadium	62,872
2	September 10	at **Arizona Cardinals**	**L** 31–32	0–2	Sun Devil Stadium	66,008
3	September 18	at **Washington Redskins**	**W** 27–21	1–2	FedExField	84,431
4	September 24	San Francisco 49ers	**L** 24–41	1–3	Texas Stadium	64,127
5	October 1	at Carolina Panthers	**W** 16–13 (OT)	2–3	Ericsson Stadium	68,909
6	Bye					
7	October 15	at **New York Giants**	**L** 14–19	2–4	Giants Stadium	78,189
8	October 22	**Arizona Cardinals**	**W** 48–7	3–4	Texas Stadium	62,981
9	October 29	Jacksonville Jaguars	**L** 17–23 (OT)	3–5	Texas Stadium	63,554
10	November 5	at **Philadelphia Eagles**	**L** 13–16 (OT)	3–6	Veterans Stadium	65,636
11	November 12	Cincinnati Bengals	**W** 23–6	4–6	Texas Stadium	62,170
12	November 19	at Baltimore Ravens	**L** 0–27	4–7	PSINet Stadium	69,416
13	November 23	Minnesota Vikings	**L** 15–27	4–8	Texas Stadium	63,878
14	December 3	at Tampa Bay Buccaneers	**L** 7–27	4–9	Raymond James Stadium	65,621
15	December 10	**Washington Redskins**	**W** 32–13	5–9	Texas Stadium	63,467
16	December 17	**New York Giants**	**L** 13–17	5–10	Texas Stadium	61,311
17	December 25	at Tennessee Titans	**L** 0–31	5–11	Adelphia Coliseum	68,498

Note: Intra-division opponents are in bold text.

=== Standings ===
NFC East
	W	L	T	PCT	PF	PA	STK
^{(1)} New York Giants	12	4	0	.750	328	246	W5
^{(4)} Philadelphia Eagles	11	5	0	.688	351	245	W2
Washington Redskins	8	8	0	.500	281	269	W1
Dallas Cowboys	5	11	0	.313	294	361	L2
Arizona Cardinals	3	13	0	.188	210	443	L7

== Roster ==
Dallas Cowboys 2000 roster
Quarterbacks: 8 Troy Aikman; 7 Randall Cunningham; 5 Clint Stoerner; 2 Anthony Wright; Running backs: 35 Troy Hambrick; 22 Emmitt Smith; 44 Robert Thomas FB; 32 Michael Wiley KR; Wide receivers: 85 Chris Brazzell; 16 Damon Hodge; 83 Wane McGarity PR; 82 James McKnight; 87 Jason Tucker KR/PR; Tight ends: 80 Chris Fontenot; 88 Jackie Harris; 89 David LaFleur; 46 James Whalen	Offensive linemen: 76 Flozell Adams T; 73 Larry Allen G; 64 Jorge Diaz G; 66 Ben Fricke C; 61 Kelvin Garmon G; 71 Alcender Jackson G/T; 62 Craig Page C; 77 Solomon Page G; 79 Erik Williams T; Defensive linemen: 96 Ebenezer Ekuban DE; 98 Greg Ellis DE; 97 Aaron Fields DE; 94 Michael Myers DT; 75 Brandon Noble DT; 68 Noel Scarlett DT; 90 Alonzo Spellman DE; 91 Dimitrius Underwood DE; 69 Chris White DE	Linebackers: 58 Joe Bowden OLB; 52 Dexter Coakley OLB; 56 Orantes Grant OLB; 54 Darren Hambrick OLB; 59 Dat Nguyen MLB; 57 Barron Wortham MLB; Defensive backs: 27 Mario Edwards CB; 23 Dwayne Goodrich CB; 38 Duane Hawthorne CB; 41 Kareem Larrimore CB; 47 Ryan McNeil CB; 43 Izell Reese FS; 30 Earl Riley SS; 20 Phillippi Sparks CB; 25 Charlie Williams CB/S; Special teams: 70 Dale Hellestrae LS; 4 Micah Knorr P; 6 Tim Seder K	Reserve lists: 84 Joey Galloway WR (IR); 95 Chad Hennings DT (IR); 81 Rocket Ismail WR (IR); 40 Sean Key S (IR); 78 Leon Lett DT (IR); 86 Mike Lucky TE (IR); 29 Greg Myers S (IR); 53 Mark Stepnoski C (IR); 31 George Teague S (IR); 50 Brandon Tolbert LB (IR); 28 Darren Woodson S (IR); 93 Peppi Zellner DE (IR); Practice squad: -- Israel Ifeanyi DE; –– Damonte McKenzie DE; Rookies in italics 53 active, 12 inactive, 2 practice squad

== Publications ==
The Football Encyclopedia ISBN 0-312-11435-4
Total Football ISBN 0-06-270170-3
Cowboys Have Always Been My Heroes ISBN 0-446-51950-2
