= Mario Edwards Jr. =

American football player (born 1994)

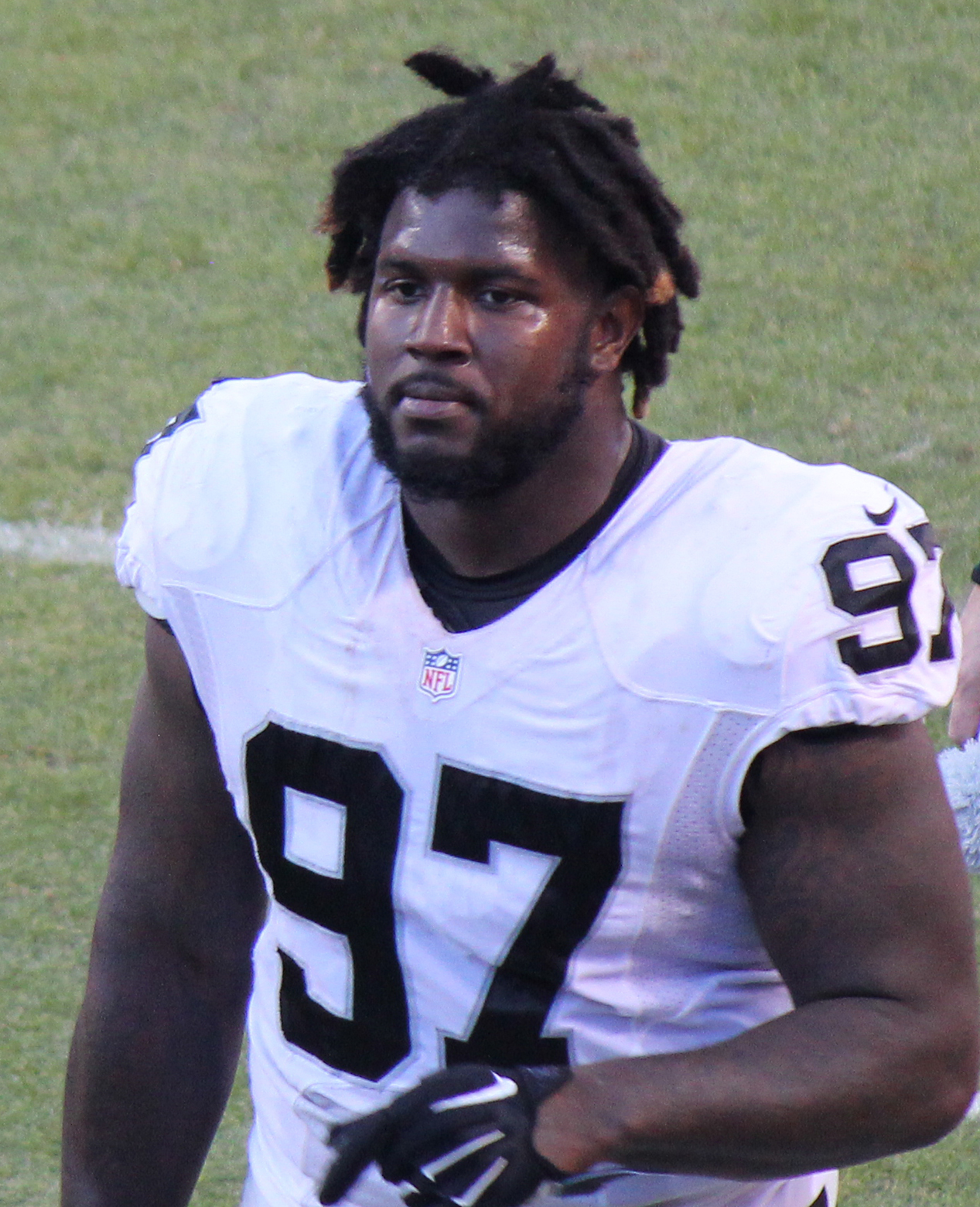
- Edwards Jr. with the Oakland Raiders in 2015

No. 97 – Houston Texans
- Position: Defensive tackle
- Roster status: Injured reserve

Personal information
- Born: January 25, 1994 (age 32); Gautier, Mississippi, U.S.
- Listed height: 6 ft 3 in (1.91 m)
- Listed weight: 280 lb (127 kg)

Career information
- High school: Billy Ryan (Denton, Texas)
- College: Florida State (2012–2014)
- NFL draft: 2015: 2nd round, 35th overall pick

Career history
- Oakland Raiders (2015–2017); New York Giants (2018); New Orleans Saints (2019); Chicago Bears (2020–2021); Jacksonville Jaguars (2022)*; Tennessee Titans (2022); Seattle Seahawks (2023); Houston Texans (2024–present)
- * Offseason or practice squad member only

Awards and highlights
- BCS national champion (2013); First-team All-ACC (2014); Third-team All-ACC (2013)

Career NFL statistics as of Week 3, 2026
- Total tackles: 206
- Sacks: 27.0
- Forced fumbles: 6
- Fumble recoveries: 2
- Pass deflections: 8
- Stats at Pro Football Reference

Mario Lashun Edwards Jr. (born January 25, 1994) is an American professional football defensive tackle for the Houston Texans of the National Football League (NFL). He played college football for the Florida State Seminoles and was selected by the Oakland Raiders in the second round of the 2015 NFL draft. He has also been a member of the New York Giants, New Orleans Saints, Chicago Bears, Jacksonville Jaguars, Tennessee Titans.

== Early life ==
Mario was raised in Denton, Texas, while his father played for the Dallas Cowboys. Edwards attended Prosper High School for his freshman and sophomore year, where he was a three-sport athlete in football, basketball and track. He started at defensive end for the state champion Eagles as a freshman. Edwards recorded 69 tackles and three sacks as a freshman on top of catching 17 passes for 361 yards and three touchdowns. He then transferred to Billy Ryan High School. As a junior, he recorded 127 tackles, 50 tackles for loss and 18 sacks leading Denton Ryan to a state runner-up finish against Austin Lake Travis led by Michael Brewer. As a senior in 2011, he recorded 72 tackles and 11 sacks and was the USA Today High School Defensive Player of the Year. Further, he earned All-American honors by USA Today, Parade, Sports Illustrated, and ESPN. In track & field, Edwards competed as a shot putter during his final two years at Denton, recording a top-throw of 15.08 meters (49 ft, 3 in) at the 2012 Richardson Invitational, where he placed first.

Regarded as a five-star recruit by Rivals.com, Edwards was ranked as the No. 1 defensive tackle prospect in his class. In fact, he was ranked No. 3 overall, which was Rivals.com's highest ranking for a defensive tackle prospect since Haloti Ngata (No. 2) in 2002. According to ESPN recruiting analyst Craig Haubert, Edwards was similar to Da'Quan Bowers at the same stage of their careers. Recruited by numerous schools, Edwards took official visits to Texas, Oklahoma, Florida State, and Louisiana State, before committing to the Seminoles on January 24, 2012.

== College career ==
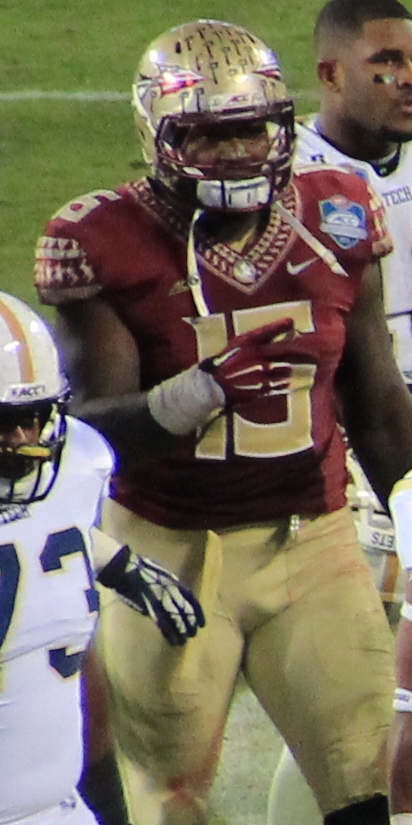
Edwards at Florida State in 2014

In his true freshman year in Tallahassee, Edwards was initially projected to redshirt, but then forced into action due to the loss of Brandon Jenkins in week one. Edwards appeared in 11 games and made his first career start in the 2012 ACC Championship Game replacing Cornellius Carradine. For the season he had 17 tackles and 1.5 sacks. As a sophomore in 2013, Edwards recorded 34 tackles, 3.5 sacks and an interception. Returning as a starter his junior season in 2014, Edwards recorded 44 tackles and 3.0 sacks.

After his junior season, Edwards entered the 2015 NFL draft.

== Professional career ==
Pre-draft measurables
Height	Weight	Arm length	Hand span	Wingspan	40-yard dash	10-yard split	20-yard split	20-yard shuttle	Three-cone drill	Vertical jump	Broad jump	Bench press
6 ft 2 5/8 in (1.90 m)	279 lb (127 kg)	33 1/4 in (0.84 m)	10 7/8 in (0.28 m)	6 ft 8 1/2 in (2.04 m)	4.84 s	1.76 s	2.84 s	4.55 s	7.44 s	32.5 in (0.83 m)	10 ft 0 in (3.05 m)	32 reps
All values from NFL Combine

=== Oakland Raiders ===
Edwards was drafted by the Oakland Raiders in the second round (35th overall) of the 2015 NFL Draft.

On June 19, 2015, the Raiders signed Edwards to a four-year, $6.01 million contract with $3.72 million guaranteed and a signing bonus of $2.63 million. On December 23, 2015, Edwards was placed on injured reserve.

On September 5, 2016, Edwards was placed on injured reserve due to a hip injury. He was activated off injured reserve to the active roster on December 23, 2016.

On September 1, 2018, Edwards was waived by the Raiders.

=== New York Giants ===
On September 2, 2018, Edwards was claimed off waivers by the New York Giants.

=== New Orleans Saints ===
On March 15, 2019, Edwards signed a two-year, $5 million contract with the New Orleans Saints. He was released on September 5, 2020.

=== Chicago Bears ===
On September 8, 2020, Edwards was signed by the Chicago Bears. He played in 15 games recording 17 tackles and a career-high 4.0 sacks.

On January 15, 2021, Edwards was suspended by the NFL for the first two games of the 2021 season for violating the league's performance-enhancing drugs policy. He signed a three-year, $11.5 million contract extension with the Bears on March 16, 2021.

Edwards was released by the Bears on August 30, 2022.

=== Jacksonville Jaguars ===
On September 4, 2022, Edwards was signed to the Jacksonville Jaguars' practice squad.

=== Tennessee Titans ===
On September 26, 2022, Edwards was signed by the Tennessee Titans off the Jaguars practice squad.

=== Seattle Seahawks ===
On May 15, 2023, Edwards signed with the Seattle Seahawks.

=== Houston Texans ===
On March 19, 2024, Edwards signed with the Houston Texans. He was suspended four games on October 14, for violating the league’s substance abuse policy. In 13 appearances (12 starts) for Houston, Edwards registered two pass deflections, two fumble recoveries, three sacks, and 31 combined tackles.

On March 11, 2025, Edwards re-signed with the Texans on a two-year, $9.5 million contract. He played in 14 games for the Texans, recording 1.5 sacks and 13 combined tackles. On December 15, head coach DeMeco Ryans announced that Edwards would miss the remainder of the season due to a pectoral tear.

On March 11, 2026, Edwards was released by the Texans following a failed physical. Edwards re-signed with the Texans on August 2. On September 30, 2026, Edwards was placed on injured reserve.

== NFL career statistics ==
Legend
**Bold**	Career high

=== Regular season ===
Year	Team	Games		Tackles					Interceptions					Fumbles			
Year	Team	GP	GS	Cmb	Solo	Ast	Sck	TFL	Int	Yds	TD	Lng	PD	FF	FR	Yds	TD
2015	OAK	14	10	**42**	**33**	**9**	2.0	3	0	0	0	0	**2**	**1**	0	0	0
2016	OAK	2	0	2	1	1	0.0	0	0	0	0	0	0	0	0	0	0
2017	OAK	14	**14**	27	19	8	3.5	4	0	0	0	0	0	0	0	0	0
2018	NYG	**15**	0	14	12	2	2.0	3	0	0	0	0	0	**1**	0	0	0
2019	NOR	14	0	8	6	2	3.0	2	0	0	0	0	0	**1**	0	0	0
2020	CHI	**15**	0	17	11	6	**4.0**	**6**	0	0	0	0	1	0	0	0	0
2021	CHI	12	1	8	2	6	2.0	1	0	0	0	0	1	0	0	0	0
2022	TEN	13	7	17	11	6	3.0	4	0	0	0	0	1	0	0	0	0
2023	SEA	**15**	1	21	15	6	2.0	5	0	0	0	0	1	**1**	0	0	0
2024	HOU	13	12	31	12	19	3.0	3	0	0	0	0	2	**0**	2	0	0
2025	HOU	14	0	13	6	7	1.5	2	0	0	0	0	0	0	0	0	0
2026	HOU	3	0	6	1	5	1.0	0	0	0	0	0	0	0	0	0	0
Total		144	45	206	129	77	27.0	33	0	0	0	0	8	6	2	0	0

=== Playoffs ===
Year	Team	Games		Tackles					Interceptions					Fumbles			
Year	Team	GP	GS	Cmb	Solo	Ast	Sck	TFL	Int	Yds	TD	Lng	PD	FF	FR	Yds	TD
2016	OAK	**1**	**1**	3	3	0	0.0	0	0	0	0	0	0	0	0	0	0
2019	NOR	**1**	0	2	1	**1**	0.0	1	0	0	0	0	0	0	0	0	0
2020	CHI	**1**	0	**4**	**4**	0	0.0	**2**	0	0	0	0	0	0	0	0	0
2024	HOU	**1**	0	**2**	**1**	1	1.5	**0**	0	0	0	0	0	0	0	0	0
Total		4	1	11	9	2	1.5	3	0	0	0	0	0	0	0	0	0

== Personal life ==
Edwards was born while his father, Mario Edwards Sr., was still in high school. While the elder Edwards played college football at Florida State, the younger stayed in Mississippi with his grandmother, Ruth Chambers, and Mario Sr.'s sister and two brothers. After Edwards Sr. was drafted by the Dallas Cowboys in 2000, the family moved to the northern Dallas area.
