= Gerald Collins (American football) =

American football player (born 1971)

No. 90
- Position: Linebacker

Personal information
- Born: February 13, 1971 (age 55); St. Louis, Missouri, U.S.

Career information
- High school: Roosevelt (St. Louis)
- College: Vanderbilt (1989–1994)
- NFL draft: 1995: undrafted

Career history
- Cincinnati Bengals (1995)
- Stats at Pro Football Reference

Gerald Collins (born February 13, 1971) is an American former professional football player who was a linebacker for the Cincinnati Bengals of the National Football League (NFL). He played college football for the Vanderbilt Commodores.

== Early life ==
Gerald Collins was born on February 13, 1971, in St. Louis, Missouri. He attended Roosevelt High School in St. Louis.

== College career ==
Collins enrolled at Vanderbilt University to play college football for the Commodores. He redshirted the 1989 season after suffering an injury. He missed most of the 1992 season with a life-threatening staphylococcus infection. Collins graduated from Vanderbilt in May 1994, but was granted a rare sixth-year of eligibility due to his injury history. He was a letterman in 1990, 1991, 1993, and 1994. At the conclusion of his college career, Collins was invited to play in the Senior Bowl.

== Professional career ==
Collins attended the 1995 NFL Combine. After going undrafted in the 1995 NFL draft, he signed with the Cincinnati Bengals on April 26, 1995. He played in three regular season games for the Bengals before tearing ligaments in his left ankle and breaking his left fibula in the September 24 game against the Houston Oilers. On September 26, Collins was placed on injured reserve and spent the remainder of the season there. The next year, on July 29, 1996, he was released by the Bengals during training camp.

== Personal life ==
Collins was one of 19 siblings in his family. In 1996, the Collins family appeared on an Oprah Winfrey Show episode about large families. Five of his brothers played college football at Penn State from 1986 to 1997; Andre played from 1986 to 1989, Gerry from 1988 to 1991, Phillip from 1990 to 1994, Jason from 1992 to 1997, and Aaron from 1993 to 1997.
