= Gerry Collins (Canadian football) =

American football player (born 1969)

No. 25, 30
- Position: Running back

Personal information
- Born: June 4, 1969 (age 57); Riverside Township, New Jersey, U.S.
- Listed height: 5 ft 7 in (1.70 m)
- Listed weight: 190 lb (86 kg)

Career information
- High school: Cinnaminson (Cinnaminson Township, New Jersey)
- College: Colorado State (1987); Penn State (1988–1991)
- NFL draft: 1992: undrafted

Career history
- Pittsburgh Steelers (1992)*; Ottawa Rough Riders (1994–1995); Edmonton Eskimos (1995–1996)
- * Offseason or practice squad member only

Gerald Scott Collins (born June 4, 1969) is an American former professional football player who was a running back in the Canadian Football League (CFL) with the Ottawa Rough Riders and Edmonton Eskimos. He played college football for the Penn State Nittany Lions.

== Early life ==
Gerald Scott Collins was born on June 4, 1969, in Riverside Township, New Jersey. He played high school football at Cinnaminson High School in Cinnaminson Township, New Jersey, garnering second-team all-South Jersey honors as a senior.

== College career ==
Due to his small size, Colorado State University was the only school to offer Collins a scholarship. He earned a varsity letter in 1987 as the Rams' fourth-string running back.

Collins transferred to Pennsylvania State University in the spring of 1988, and redshirted the 1988 season as a walk-on member of the scout team. Collins was then a three-year letterman for the Penn State Nittany Lions from 1989 to 1991. He earned a scholarship in 1989 after a strong performance in Penn State's spring Blue-White game. Collins began the 1991 season as the starting tailback but was later replaced by Richie Anderson. He rushed for 293 yards and one touchdown in 1989, 165 yards and one touchdown in 1990, and 361 yards and two touchdowns in 1991. Collins also caught eight passes for 98 yards and returned three punts for 38 yards during his college career.

== Professional career ==
=== Pittsburgh Steelers ===
On May 2, 1992, it was reported that Collins had signed with the Pittsburgh Steelers after going undrafted in the 1992 NFL draft. He was waived on August 19, 1992. He then worked as the strength and conditioning coach for the Penn State football team from 1992 to 1993.

=== Ottawa Rough Riders ===
In March 1994, Collins attended a tryout camp for the Baltimore CFLers. He impressed the team, but the Ottawa Rough Riders held his negotiating rights. He signed with the Rough Riders in April 1994. In July 1994, Collins became Ottawa's starting running back due to an injury to Mike Richardson. Collins rushed for 128 yards during his CFL debut. He missed part of the year with an injury. Collins was made inactive for the season finale so the team could promote wide receiver Keith Jack. Collins was the Rough Riders' nominee for the CFL's Most Outstanding Rookie Award. He dressed in nine games overall in 1994, rushing 105 times for 526 yards and two touchdowns while also catching 31 passes for 328 yards. During the 1994 season, he earned $44,450 CAD (not including bonuses). He was released during training camp in June 1995.

In August 1995, Collins was re-signed by Ottawa to serve as a backup after starting running back Mike Richardson suffered another injury. Collins played in six games for the Rough Riders during the 1995 season, totaling 34 carries for 123 yards, 11 receptions for 80 yards, and 14 kickoff returns for 251 yards. Collins was released in September 1995 after Richardson returned from injury.

=== Edmonton Eskimos ===
Collins was then signed to the Edmonton Eskimos' practice roster in September 1995. He was promoted to the active roster for the final game of the regular season after Edmonton decided to rest Eric Blount for the playoffs. In the season finale, Collins rushed 12 times for 54 yards, caught four passes for 11 yards, and returned three kickoffs for 37 yards.

In 1996, Collins made the roster as a kick returner and backup running back. He dressed in eight games during the 1996 season, recording seven rushing attempts for 11 yards, 17 catches for 129 yards, and 11 kickoff returns for 214 yards. He was released on September 12, 1996.

== Personal life ==
Collins was the 13th of 19 siblings in his family. In 1996, the Collins family appeared on an Oprah Winfrey Show episode about large families. Gerry was one of five brothers who played college football at Penn State from 1986 to 1997; Andre played from 1986 to 1989, Gerry from 1988 to 1991, Phillip from 1990 to 1994, Jason from 1992 to 1997, and Aaron from 1993 to 1997. Another of their brothers, Gerald, played college football at Vanderbilt and in the NFL for the Cincinnati Bengals in 1995.

As of 2014, Collins was living in Ottawa and working as a personal trainer.
