= Richie Anderson (American football) =

American football player and coach (born 1971)

No. 33, 20
- Position: Fullback

Personal information
- Born: September 13, 1971 (age 55); Olney, Maryland, U.S.
- Listed height: 6 ft 2 in (1.88 m)
- Listed weight: 215 lb (98 kg)

Career information
- High school: Sherwood (Sandy Spring, Maryland)
- College: Penn State
- NFL draft: 1993: 6th round, 144th overall pick

Career history

Playing
- New York Jets (1993–2002); Dallas Cowboys (2003–2004)

Coaching
- New York Jets (2005–2006); Arizona Cardinals (2006); Kansas City Chiefs (2009–2011)

Awards and highlights
- Pro Bowl (2000); Second-team All-East (1991)

Career NFL statistics
- Rushing yards: 1,274
- Rushing average: 4
- Rushing touchdowns: 4
- Receptions: 400
- Receiving yards: 3,149
- Receiving touchdowns: 14
- Stats at Pro Football Reference

Richard Darnell Anderson (born September 13, 1971) is an American former professional football player who was a fullback in the National Football League (NFL) for the New York Jets and Dallas Cowboys. He played college football for the Penn State Nittany Lions.

== Early life ==
Anderson attended Sherwood High School. As a sophomore, he was a two-way player at running back and safety. As a junior, he tallied 1,512 rushing yards and 18 touchdowns in the regular season.

As a senior, he appeared in 10 games, posting 2,062 rushing yards (8.18-yard avg.), 22 touchdowns and five two-point conversions. He received All-state, Prep All-American, Washington Post Offensive Player of the Year and USA Today Maryland Player of the Year honors. He finished his high school career with 3,500 yards.

In basketball, he played at shooting guard, averaging 22 points and leading the county in scoring as a junior. He averaged 23 points as a senior. As a junior, he averaged 22 points per game and led the county in scoring. In track, he competed in the 100 metres, 200 metres and high jump. He received All-county honors as a senior.

== College career ==
Anderson accepted a football scholarship from Penn State University. As a freshman, he was a third-string running back, collecting 16 carries for 77 yards and 7 kickoff returns for 156 yards (22.3-yard avg.). In 1990, he sat out his sophomore season as a medical redshirt with a back injury.

As a sophomore in 1991, he struggled in the first seven games while splitting time with Gerry Collins and Shelly Hammonds. He improved in the last four contests, registering 599 yards and 7 touchdowns. He finished with 779 rushing yards (led the team), 10 rushing touchdowns, 21 receptions (third on the team), 255 receiving yards, one receiving touchdown, 9 kickoff returns for 222 yards (24.7-yard avg·) and 1,256 all-purpose yards.

Anderson entered his junior season with Joe Paterno mentioning him as probably the most powerful of all the tailbacks he had coached. He posted 195 carries for 900 rushing yards (led the team), 19 total touchdowns (second highest in school history) and 116 points (second in the nation).

He declared for the NFL draft after his junior season. He finished his college career with 363 carries for 1,756 rushing yards, 29 rushing touchdowns, 37 receptions for 353 receiving yards and 2 receiving touchdowns. At the time he ranked 8th on the Penn State career rushing list.

== Professional career ==
Pre-draft measurables
Height	Weight	Arm length	Hand span	40-yard dash	10-yard split	20-yard split	20-yard shuttle	Vertical jump	Broad jump	Bench press
6 ft 1 3/4 in (1.87 m)	220 lb (100 kg)	32 1/4 in (0.82 m)	9 in (0.23 m)	4.56 s	1.62 s	2.68 s	4.27 s	35.5 in (0.90 m)	10 ft 1 in (3.07 m)	16 reps

=== New York Jets ===
Anderson was selected by the New York Jets in the sixth round (144th overall) of the 1993 NFL draft. As a rookie, he appeared in 7 games, posting 4 kickoff returns for 66 yards, 6 special teams tackles (sixth on the team). He missed Weeks 11 to 15 with an ankle sprain before being placed on the injured reserve list on January 2 1994.

In 1994, he appeared in 13 games (4 starts), rushing for 207 yards (second on the team), one rushing touchdown, 25 receptions (fifth on the team), 212 receiving yards and one touchdown. In the tenth game against the Green Bay Packers, he had 7 carries for 74 rushing yards, including a 55-yard run.

In 1995, he appeared in 10 games, collecting 5 carries for 17 yards and 5 receptions for 26 yards. He missed the ninth game against the New England Patriots with the flu. He missed the tenth game against the Seattle Seahawks with a right high ankle sprain. He missed the last 4 games after being placed on the injured reserve list in December.

In 1996, he passed Brad Baxter on the depth chart and was named the regular starter at fullback. He contributed to Adrian Murrell rushing for 1,249 yards.

In 1997, the Jets signed free agent fullback Lorenzo Neal, relegating Anderson to a platoon role. He appeared in 16 games (6 starts), collecting 21 carries for 70 yards, 26 receptions for 150 yards and one touchdown.

In 1998, the team signed free agent fullback Keith Byars. Anderson only played in 8 games, with one start in the season finale for an injured Byars.

In 1999, he regained the starter position, by being used in a hybrid fullback/tight end role. He appeared in 16 games with 9 starts. He contributed to Curtis Martin rushing for 1,464 yards, including six 100-yard games. He was fourth on the team with 29 receptions for 302 yards.

In 2000, he led the running backs in the league with a career-high 88 receptions (franchise record) for 853 yards and 2 touchdowns, while tallying 27 carries for 63 yards. He also helped Martin rush for 1,204 yards. He was named as the American Football Conference starting fullback in the Pro Bowl.

In 2001, he appeared in 16 games with 15 starts and contributed to Martin rushing for a franchise record 1,513 yards. He ranked fourth on the team in catches (40) and fifth in receiving yards (252). He also had 26 carries for 102 yards and 2 receiving touchdowns.

In 2002, he played in 16 games with 14 starts, helping Martin to rush for 1,094 yards. He posted 45 receptions for 257 yards, one receiving touchdown and 5 carries for 27 yards. In 2003, the Jets chose to re-sign fullback Jerald Sowell and let Anderson leave in free agency. He left the team with 305 receptions, which was a franchise record for running backs.

=== Dallas Cowboys ===
On March 4, 2003, he signed as a free agent with the Dallas Cowboys, reuniting him with his former Jets head coach Bill Parcells. He registered career-highs with 70 carries and 306 rushing yards, while leading the team in receptions (69), even though he was a fullback. He also lined up at running back, tight end, wide receiver and on special teams. He also contributed to Troy Hambrick rushing for a career-high 972 yards. Though his play on the field was notable, it was his attitude, character and leadership that was also valuable to the team, earning him a team captain denomination.

In 2004, he suffered a bone bruise in the season opener, which forced him to miss a game. In the tenth game against the Baltimore Ravens, he suffered a herniated disc neck injury, missing two games before being placed on the injured reserve list on December 28.

On April 28, 2005, he was released because of his injury. A couple of his main highlights with the Cowboys, occurred when he threw a left-handed touchdown pass to Terry Glenn in a 2004 game against the Washington Redskins, and when he leaped 5 feet in the air over former Philadelphia Eagles cornerback Troy Vincent.

On February 2, 2006, he signed a one-day contract to officially retired with the New York Jets, the team that drafted him. He appeared in 161 games (88 starts), rushed 318 times for 1,274 yards with 4 rushing touchdowns and caught 400 passes for 3,149 yards with 14 reception touchdowns.

=== NFL statistics ===
Year	Team	Games	Carries	Yards	Yards per carry	Longest carry	Touchdowns	First downs	Fumbles	Fumbles lost
1994	NYJ	13	43	207	4.8	55	1	10	1	1
1995	NYJ	10	5	17	3.4	10	0	2	2	2
1996	NYJ	16	47	150	3.2	11	1	15	0	0
1997	NYJ	16	21	70	3.3	19	0	4	1	0
1998	NYJ	8	1	2	2.0	2	0	0	0	0
1999	NYJ	16	16	84	5.3	16	0	4	0	0
2000	NYJ	16	27	63	2.3	9	0	8	0	0
2001	NYJ	16	26	102	3.9	12	0	4	0	0
2002	NYJ	16	5	27	5.4	16	0	1	0	0
2003	DAL	15	70	306	4.4	19	1	16	0	0
2004	DAL	12	57	246	4.3	27	1	11	1	1
Career		161	318	1,274	4.0	55	4	75	5	4

== Coaching career ==
In 2005, he joined the New York Jets coaching staff as an assistant wide receivers coach. In February 2006, Anderson joined the Arizona Cardinals coaching staff as a wide receivers coach. In 2007, he was moved to tight ends coach. On October 15, 2006, Anderson joined the Kansas City Chiefs to be the wide receivers coach, replacing former NFL wide receiver Dedric Ward.
