= Alshermond Singleton =

American football player (born 1975)

No. 51
- Position: Linebacker

Personal information
- Born: August 7, 1975 (age 51); Newark, New Jersey, U.S.
- Listed height: 6 ft 2 in (1.88 m)
- Listed weight: 250 lb (113 kg)

Career information
- High school: Irvington (NJ)
- College: Temple
- NFL draft: 1997: 4th round, 128th overall pick

Career history
- Tampa Bay Buccaneers (1997–2002); Dallas Cowboys (2003–2006)

Awards and highlights
- Super Bowl champion (XXXVII); All-Big East (1996)

Career NFL statistics
- Total tackles: 299
- Sacks: 4.5
- Forced fumbles: 2
- Interceptions: 5
- Defensive touchdowns: 2
- Stats at Pro Football Reference

Alshermond Glendale Singleton (born August 7, 1975) is an American former professional football linebacker in the National Football League (NFL) for the Tampa Bay Buccaneers and Dallas Cowboys. He played college football at Temple University.

== Early life ==
Singleton attended Irvington High School. As a senior linebacker, he received second-team All-state, SuperPrep All-American, All-area and All-county honors. He also played in the New Jersey North-South All-Star game.

He accepted a football scholarship from Temple University. As a freshman, he appeared in 8 games, starting 6 at strongside linebacker, while recording 31 tackles (one for loss) and 1.5 sacks. He missed the final three games with a fractured right arm.

As a sophomore, he was named the regular starter at strongside linebacker, tallying 74 tackles (second on the team), one sack, 5 passes defensed, 5 forced fumbles (school record) and one blocked punt.

As a junior, he was named the starter at middle linebacker, registering 151 tackles and becoming only the fourth player in school history to surpass 150 tackles in a season. He also added one sack, one pass defensed and one fumble recovery

As a senior, he was a defensive captain at middle linebacker, posting 134 tackles (led the team), one interception, 5 passes defensed and 2 forced fumbles.

He finished his college career as the school's third all-time leading tackler (390), while starting 39 out of 41 games. He also had 5 sacks, one interception, 11 passes defensed, 7 forced fumbles and one fumble recovery.

== Professional career ==
Pre-draft measurables
Height	Weight	Arm length	Hand span	40-yard dash	10-yard split	20-yard split	20-yard shuttle	Vertical jump	Broad jump	Bench press
6 ft 2 1/4 in (1.89 m)	224 lb (102 kg)	34 1/2 in (0.88 m)	9 3/4 in (0.25 m)	4.77 s	1.73 s	2.77 s	4.20 s	39.5 in (1.00 m)	10 ft 2 in (3.10 m)	20 reps

=== Tampa Bay Buccaneers ===
Singleton was selected by the Tampa Bay Buccaneers in the fourth round (128th overall) of the 1997 NFL draft. As a rookie, he played mainly on special teams, making 4 special teams tackles and 2 blocked punt, returning the one he blocked in the fifth game against the Arizona Cardinals for a touchdown.

In 1998, he was a backup at strongside linebacker behind Jeff Gooch, collecting 18 tackles, one pass defensed and 4 special teams tackles.

In 1999, he was a reserve behind Shelton Quarles, making 26 tackles, one interception, 2 passes defensed and 15 special teams tackles. He had one tackle in the Divisional Playoff Game win against the Washington Redskins, before fracturing his left ankle in the fourth quarter, forcing him to miss the NFC Championship Game against the St. Louis Rams.

In 2000, he registered 32 tackles, one pass defensed, 11 special teams tackles (tied for fifth on the team), one forced fumble and one blocked punt. He suffered a knee injury in the 13th game against the Dallas Cowboys, which forced him to miss the final 3 contests of the regular season.

In 2001, he posted 32 tackles, one sack, 2 passes defensed and 11 special teams tackles (sixth on the team).

In 2002, he was named the starter at strongside linebacker after Quarles was moved to the middle linebacker. He finished with 89 tackles, one interception, 3 passed defensed and 3 special teams tackles. He also contributed to the team having the league's top ranking defense and winning Super Bowl XXXVII.

=== Dallas Cowboys ===
On March 13, 2003, he signed with the Dallas Cowboys as a free agent to take over the starting strongside linebacker position, that was previously handled by the departed Kevin Hardy. He recorded 57 tackles (sixth on the team), 7 quarterback pressures, 5 passes defensed, 3 special teams tackles, 2 interceptions (tied for second on the team) and one returned for a touchdown. He also helped the team have the league's top ranking defense.

In 2004, he had 57 tackles (sixth on the team), one quarterback pressure, one pass defensed, 3 special teams tackles, one forced fumble and one fumble recovery. He missed the last 3 games after being placed on the injured reserve list with an abdomen injury on December 23. He was replaced with Scott Shanle.

In 2005, the team switched to a 3-4 defense, but he was still able the remain the starter at the left outside linebacker position, until suffering a broken clavicle against the Arizona Cardinals during the week 8 and being placed on the injured reserve list on November 1. He appeared in 7 games, making 19 tackles, 3 quarterback pressures, 3 passes defensed, one interception and 4 special teams tackles. He was replaced with Scott Fujita.

In 2006, he lost his starting job after Greg Ellis was converted from a defensive end into an outside linebacker, but was able to start 6 games after Ellis was lost for the season with an Achilles injury. He finished with 22 tackles, one sack, one pass defensed, 8 special teams tackles (seventh on the team) and one forced fumble. He wasn't re-signed at the end of the season.

== NFL career statistics ==
Legend
	Won the Super Bowl
**Bold**	Career high

=== Regular season ===
Year	Team	Games		Tackles				Interceptions				Fumbles			
Year	Team	GP	GS	Comb	Solo	Ast	Sck	Int	Yds	TD	Lng	FF	FR	Yds	TD
1997	TAM	12	0	0	0	0	0.0	0	0	0	0	0	0	0	0
1998	TAM	15	0	15	11	4	0.0	0	0	0	0	0	0	0	0
1999	TAM	15	0	32	23	9	0.5	1	7	0	7	0	0	0	0
2000	TAM	13	1	29	22	7	0.0	0	0	0	0	0	0	0	0
2001	TAM	16	0	26	22	4	**1.0**	0	0	0	0	0	**1**	0	0
2002	TAM	16	14	**63**	**43**	**20**	**1.0**	1	0	0	0	**1**	0	0	0
2003	DAL	16	15	43	34	9	**1.0**	**2**	**42**	**1**	**41**	0	**1**	0	0
2004	DAL	13	12	48	35	13	0.0	0	0	0	0	0	0	0	0
2005	DAL	8	7	18	13	5	0.0	1	0	0	0	0	0	0	0
2006	DAL	16	6	25	18	7	**1.0**	0	0	0	0	**1**	0	0	0
		140	55	299	221	78	4.5	5	49	1	41	2	2	0	0

=== Playoffs ===
Year	Team	Games		Tackles				Interceptions				Fumbles			
Year	Team	GP	GS	Comb	Solo	Ast	Sck	Int	Yds	TD	Lng	FF	FR	Yds	TD
1999	TAM	1	0	1	1	0	0.0	0	0	0	0	0	0	0	0
2000	TAM	1	0	5	1	**4**	0.5	0	0	0	0	0	0	0	0
2001	TAM	1	0	2	1	1	0.0	0	0	0	0	0	0	0	0
2002	TAM	3	2	**10**	**10**	0	**1.0**	0	0	0	0	**1**	0	0	0
2003	DAL	1	1	5	5	0	0.0	0	0	0	0	0	0	0	0
2006	DAL	1	0	0	0	0	0.0	0	0	0	0	0	0	0	0
		8	3	23	18	5	1.5	0	0	0	0	1	0	0	0

== Personal life ==
Singleton owned and operated dry cleaning stores in Morris Plains, New Jersey. On July 31, 2015, he returned to the Buccaneers franchise as a coaching intern. In 2017, he was named the defensive line coach at Fairleigh Dickinson University.
