= Kareem Larrimore =

American football player (born 1976)

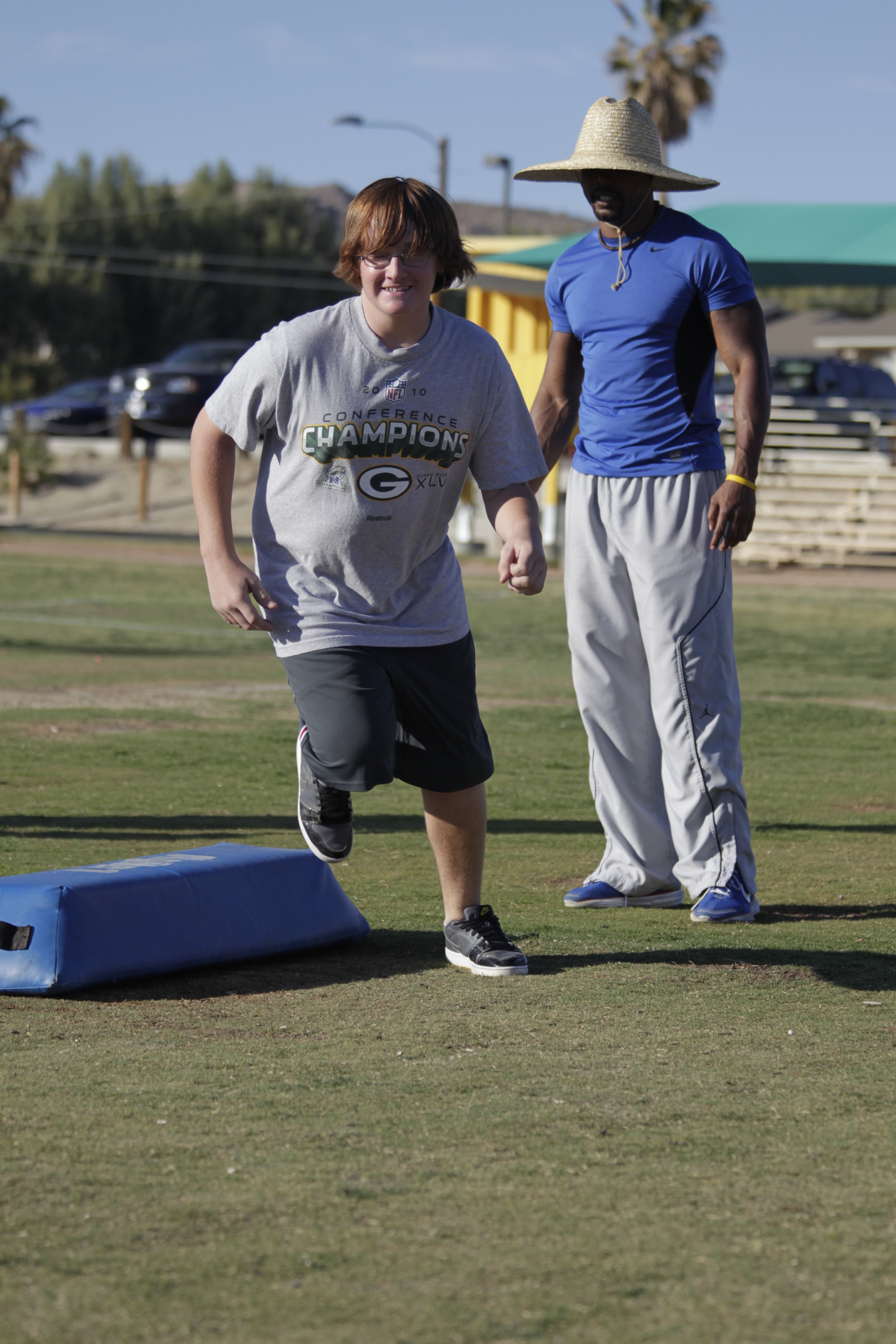
- Larrimore watches as a young participant runs an agility drill during a three day football camp

No. 41
- Position: Cornerback

Personal information
- Born: April 21, 1976 (age 50); Los Angeles, California, U.S.
- Listed height: 5 ft 11 in (1.80 m)
- Listed weight: 190 lb (86 kg)

Career information
- High school: Locke (Los Angeles, California)
- College: Cerritos JC (1996–1997); West Texas A&M (1998–1999)
- NFL draft: 2000: 4th round, 109th overall pick

Career history
- Dallas Cowboys (2000–2001); Dallas Desperados (2002–2003); Austin Wranglers (2004)*; Chicago Rush (2004); Amarillo Dusters (2004)
- * Offseason or practice squad member only

Awards and highlights
- Division II All-American (1999); 2× All-Lone Star Conference (1998, 1999); AFL All-Rookie Team (2002)

Career NFL statistics
- Games played: 19
- Total tackles: 25
- Forced fumbles: 2
- Pass deflections: 2
- Return yards: 22
- Stats at Pro Football Reference

Career AFL statistics
- Total tackles: 55
- Pass deflections: 10
- Interceptions: 10
- Return yards: 1,580
- Return touchdowns: 2
- Stats at ArenaFan.com

Kareem Maktrel Larrimore (born April 21, 1976) is an American former professional football player who was a cornerback for the Dallas Cowboys of the National Football League (NFL). He played college football for the West Texas A&M Buffaloes and was selected by the Cowboys in the fourth round of the 2000 NFL draft. He was also a member of the Dallas Desperados, Austin Wranglers, and Chicago Rush of the Arena Football League (AFL), and the Amarillo Dusters (then of the IFL).

== Early life ==
Larrimore attended Locke High School, where he played only one year of football as a cornerback and returner. Because of poor grades, he spent one year after graduating earning his GED, before walking-on at Cerritos Junior College where he was a two-year starter at cornerback and was named junior college All-American as a sophomore.

After the gang-related death of his brother, he transferred to West Texas A&M, where he received Division II All-American and All-Lone Star Conference honors.

As a junior in 1998, he had 34 tackles (4 for loss), two interceptions (which he returned for 90 yards and one touchdown) and 7 passes defensed, along with 20 kickoff returns for 532 yards (26.6 avg.) and one touchdown of 100 yards (tied a school record).

As a senior in 1999, he missed the season opener, but played the rest of the year, registering 32 tackles, 5 interceptions (which he returned for 109 total yards and a 74-yard touchdown) and 10 passes defensed, along with 15 kickoff returns for 318 yards. After the season, he played in the Blue-Gray All-Star Game, where he returned a kickoff 99 yards for a touchdown, which was a first in the 62-year history of the game. He also played in the Senior Bowl.

== Professional career ==
=== Dallas Cowboys ===
Larrimore was selected by the Dallas Cowboys in the fourth round (109th overall) of the 2000 NFL draft, after dropping because of character concerns and failing a marijuana test in the scouting combine.

He impressed the team with his athletic ability from the beginning and moved ahead of fellow rookie draft picks Dwayne Goodrich and Mario Edwards. Two weeks into training camp, he was named the starter at left cornerback in place of a retired Kevin Smith. He was just the second rookie in franchise history (Ron Francis was the first) to start at cornerback in the season opener, but he struggled and was replaced with the more experienced Phillippi Sparks after the fourth game of the season. The move didn't sit well with Larrimore and violations of team rules started to affect his standing with the team. He appeared in 15 games (4 starts), making 20 defensive tackles, one quarterback pressure, 2 forced fumbles and 7 special teams tackles.

In 2001, he was suspended for the final preseason game, the season opener and fined for missing curfew when the Cowboys traveled to Mexico City to play the Oakland Raiders in the American Bowl. On October 23, he was released, with reports later surfacing that he had been fined at least 11 other times for various reasons. He appeared in 4 games (2 starts), posting 8 tackles and 2 passes defensed.

Larrimore played for the Cowboys for two seasons, appearing in 19 regular season games (15 in 2000, four in 2001) and starting in 6 games.

=== Dallas Desperados (AFL) ===
On May 21, 2002, he signed with the Dallas Desperados of the Arena Football League, who were owned by Jerry Jones, who also was the owner of the Dallas Cowboys. As a rookie, he played in nine games, earning the position as the team's top kick returner and defensive specialist. He received AFL All-Rookie honors after finishing with 24.5 tackles, 5 passes defensed and one interception.

In 2003, knee and back injuries limited him to seven games, while spending time on the Reserve/Injured list three times. He recorded 26.5 tackles, 4 passes defensed, 2 interceptions and 27 kickoff returns for 476 yards (17.6 avg.).

=== Chicago Rush (AFL) ===
Larrimore was selected by the Austin Wranglers in the league's expansion draft, but was traded to the Chicago Rush in exchange for Cedric Walker on October 15, 2003. He was waived on April 7, 2004, after registering 11 tackles, one interception, 21 kickoff returns for 485 yards and 2 touchdowns.

=== Amarillo Dusters (IFL) ===
After three seasons in the Arena Football League, Larrimore signed with the Amarillo Dusters then of the Intense Football League, on May 28, 2004.

=== Inglewood Blackhawks (LCFL) ===
In 2009, he signed with the Inglewood Blackhawks of the LCFL West Semi pro league. He helped the team win the 2010 LCFL Championship.

== Personal life ==
In 2017, Larrimore was hired as the cornerback assistant coach for one season at Cerritos College.

== See also ==
- List of National Football League and Arena football players
