= Damon Hodge =

American gridiron football player (born 1977)

No. 16
- Position: Wide receiver

Personal information
- Born: February 16, 1977 (age 49); Thomaston, Alabama, U.S.
- Listed height: 6 ft 1 in (1.85 m)
- Listed weight: 192 lb (87 kg)

Career information
- High school: Amelia L. Johnson (AL)
- College: Alabama State
- NFL draft: 2000: undrafted

Career history
- Dallas Cowboys (2000); Seattle Seahawks (2002)*; Ottawa Renegades (2002); Grand Rapids Rampage (2003); Denver Broncos (2003)*; Hamilton Tiger-Cats (2003); Grand Rapids Rampage (2004–2005)
- * Offseason or practice squad member only

Awards and highlights
- All-SWAC (1998); Black College All-American (1998)

Career NFL statistics
- Receptions: 4
- Receiving yards: 60
- TDs: 0
- Stats at Pro Football Reference
- Stats at ArenaFan.com

Damon Hodge (born February 16, 1977) is an American former professional football player who was a wide receiver in the National Football League (NFL) for the Dallas Cowboys. He also was a member of the Grand Rapids Rampage, Ottawa Renegades and Hamilton Tiger-Cats. He played college football for the Alabama State Hornets.

== Early life ==
Hodge attended Amelia Love Johnson High School, where he practiced football and basketball. He played the trombone in the school band, before joining the football team as a senior. He received Bluechip All-American honors at the end of the season.

He accepted a football scholarship from Alabama State University. As a freshman, he had 2 receptions for 34 yards. As a sophomore, he was named a starter at wide receiver, tallying 53 receptions for 737 yards, 9 touchdowns and 2 two-point conversions.

As a junior, he registered a school record 83 receptions for 1,023 yards and 9 touchdowns, becoming the school's All-time leading receiver. As a senior, he collected 38 receptions for 486 yards and 3 touchdowns, despite catching passes from 4 different quarterbacks.

He finished his college career with 176 receptions (school record), 2,280 receiving yards (second in school history), 21 receiving touchdowns, 4 two-point conversions and 134 points (sixth in school history).

In 2025, he was inducted in Alabama State University's Athletics Hall of Fame.

== Professional career ==
=== Dallas Cowboys ===
Hodge was signed as an undrafted free agent by the Dallas Cowboys after the 2000 NFL draft, on April 19. He was released on August 27 and later signed to the practice squad. On October 12, he was promoted to the active roster to provide depth because of injuries. He made his NFL debut against the New York Giants, making 3 receptions for 52 yards (17.3-yard avg.), while playing as the second wide receiver in place of an injured James McKnight. He saw limited action over the next 8 weeks and was deactivated in the season finale. He was released on September 2, 2001.

=== Seattle Seahawks ===
On January 17, 2002, he was signed as a free agent by the Seattle Seahawks. He was allocated to the Frankfurt Galaxy of NFL Europe, but was released on March 31. He was cut by the Seahawks on September 1.

=== Ottawa Renegades ===
On September 9, 2002, he was signed by the Ottawa Renegades of the Canadian Football League. He appeared in 5 games, posting 9 receptions for 163 yards and 2 touchdowns. On October 31, he was released to allow him to join the NFL.

=== Grand Rapids Rampage ===
On January 8, 2003, he signed with the Grand Rapids Rampage of the Arena Football League, to play as a wide receiver and linebacker.

=== Denver Broncos ===
On July 24, 2003, he was signed by the Denver Broncos as a free agent. On August 12, he was released to make room for wide receiver Nate Jackson.

=== Hamilton Tiger-Cats (CFL) ===
On July 22, 2003, he was traded from the Ottawa Renegades to the Hamilton Tiger-Cats in exchange for the rights to return specialist J.J. Moses. He appeared in 5 games, registering 16 receptions for 278 yards. He was released on June 6, 2004.

=== Grand Rapids Rampage ===
On November 19, 2003, he was signed by the Grand Rapids Rampage. He was released on February 24, 2004.

On October 22, 2004, he was re-signed. On February 22, 2005, he was placed on the injured reserve list. On March 23, he was placed on recallable waivers.
