= Erik Bickerstaff =

American football player (born 1980)

No. 46
- Position: Fullback

Personal information
- Born: July 25, 1980 (age 46); Birmingham, Alabama, U.S.
- Listed height: 6 ft 0 in (1.83 m)
- Listed weight: 230 lb (104 kg)

Career information
- High school: Waukesha North (Waukesha, Wisconsin)
- College: Wisconsin
- NFL draft: 2003: undrafted

Career history
- Dallas Cowboys (2003–2004); Oakland Raiders (2005)*
- * Offseason or practice squad member only

Career NFL statistics
- Rushing attempts: 19
- Rushing yards: 56
- Rushing TDs: 1
- Stats at Pro Football Reference

Erik Bickerstaff (born July 25, 1980) is an American former professional football player who was a fullback in the National Football League (NFL) for the Dallas Cowboys. He played college football for the Wisconsin Badgers.

== Early life ==
Bickerstaff attended Waukesha North High School. As a junior, he posted 1,516 yards and 16 touchdowns, receiving All-league honors as a running back. He was suspended for his senior season after being caught drinking.

He also lettered in track, where he was a three-time All-league selection running the 400 metres hurdles.

== College career ==
Bickerstaff walked-on at the University of Wisconsin–Madison. As a redshirt freshman, he was moved to fullback and registered only one carry in a 59-0 win against Indiana University. He was the backup fullback as a sophomore. He played mainly on special teams as a junior.

Although he had earned a scholarship as a senior in 2002, he was ruled academically ineligible for his final season, after discovering that his low ACT score made him eligible for just three season and not four. He transferred to Stillman College, but the program had just been accepted to the NCAA and he ended up with the same problem, so he returned to Wisconsin and spent his senior season working as a janitor at Camp Randall Stadium.

== Professional career ==
=== Dallas Cowboys ===
Bickerstaff was signed as an undrafted free agent by the Dallas Cowboys after the 2003 NFL draft and needed two tryouts to sign a contract offer on August 5. As a rookie, he was declared inactive for the first 8 games. He was waived on November 3 and signed to the practice squad, in order to make room for running back Adrian Murrell. On December 2, he was promoted to the active roster to replace an injured Aveion Cason. He registered 19 carries for 56 yards, one touchdown.

On June 9, 2004, he ruptured his left Achilles tendon during a minicamp workout and was placed on the injured reserve list on July 9. The next year, he was limited with a neck injury he suffered in August and was waived on September 3, 2005.

=== Oakland Raiders ===
On September 5, 2005, he was signed by the Oakland Raiders to their practice squad. He was cut on September 14. After his release he worked out for a couple of teams, but did not receive a contract due to his neck injury and decided to retire in December 2005.
