= Aaron Fields =

American gridiron football player (born 1976)

No. 97
- Position: Defensive end

Personal information
- Born: January 9, 1976 (age 50); Notasulga, Alabama, U.S.
- Listed height: 6 ft 4 in (1.93 m)
- Listed weight: 243 lb (110 kg)

Career information
- High school: Notasulga
- College: Troy State
- NFL draft: 2000: undrafted

Career history
- Dallas Cowboys (2000)*; Atlanta Falcons (2000)*; Dallas Cowboys (2000); Green Bay Packers (2001–2002)*; Edmonton Eskimos (2003)*
- * Offseason or practice squad member only

Awards and highlights
- All-Southland (1999)

Career NFL statistics
- Games played: 3
- Stats at Pro Football Reference

Aaron Fields (born January 9, 1976) is an American former professional football player who was a defensive end in the National Football League (NFL) for the Dallas Cowboys and Atlanta Falcons. He played college football for the Troy Trojans.

== Early life ==
Fields attended Notasulga High School, where he practiced football and basketball. He played as a wide receiver, tight end and linebacker. He received All-area honors in both sports as a senior.

He accepted a football scholarship from Savannah State University. He transferred to Troy State after his sophomore season. As a junior, he tallied 7 tackles (one for loss), one sack and 3 quarterback pressures.

As a senior he was named a starter at defensive end, posting 54 tackles (sixth on the team), 7 sacks, 21 quarterback pressures, 14 tackles for loss, 3 passes defensed, one forced fumble and one fumble recovery.

== Professional career ==
=== Dallas Cowboys (first stint) ===
Fields was signed as an undrafted free agent by the Dallas Cowboys after the 2000 NFL draft, on April 19. He was waived on August 27.

=== Atlanta Falcons ===
On August 30, 2000, he was signed by the Atlanta Falcons to their practice squad, where he spent the first 10 weeks of the regular season.

=== Dallas Cowboys (second stint) ===
On November 8, 2000, he was signed by the Dallas Cowboys from the Falcons' practice squad, after Chad Hennings was lost for the season with a neck injury. He was declared inactive from week 11 to week 13. He saw action against the Tampa Bay Buccaneers, Washington Redskins and New York Giants. He was deactivated in the season finale. He was released on August 21.

=== Green Bay Packers ===
On August 22, 2001, he was claimed off waivers by the Green Bay Packers. He was cut on August 26. On January 24, 2002, he was re-signed. He was released on August 27.

=== Edmonton Eskimos ===
On April 2, 2003, he was signed by the Edmonton Eskimos of the Canadian Football League. He was released on June 6.
