= Aveion Cason =

American football player (born 1979)

No. 82, 31, 23, 27, 26, 36
- Position: Running back

Personal information
- Born: July 12, 1979 (age 47); St. Petersburg, Florida, U.S.
- Listed height: 5 ft 10 in (1.78 m)
- Listed weight: 215 lb (98 kg)

Career information
- High school: Lakewood (St. Petersburg)
- College: Illinois State
- NFL draft: 2001: undrafted

Career history
- St. Louis Rams (2001); Kansas City Chiefs (2001)*; Detroit Lions (2001–2002); Dallas Cowboys (2003); Arizona Cardinals (2004)*; St. Louis Rams (2004–2005); Detroit Lions (2006–2008); Florida Tuskers (2010)
- * Offseason or practice squad member only

Awards and highlights
- All-Gateway Conference Newcomer Team (1998); All-Gateway (1999)

Career NFL statistics
- Rushing attempts: 126
- Rushing yards: 562
- Rushing touchdowns: 3
- Receptions: 64
- Receiving yards: 655
- Receiving touchdowns: 2
- Stats at Pro Football Reference

Aveion Marquel Cason (born July 12, 1979) is an American former professional football player who was a running back and kick returner in the National Football League (NFL) for the St. Louis Rams, Detroit Lions and Dallas Cowboys. He also was a member of the Florida Tuskers in the United Football League (UFL). He played college football for the Illinois State Redbirds.

== Early life ==
Cason attended Lakewood High School in St. Petersburg, Florida. As a junior, he rushed for 980 yards and averaged nearly 38.0-yards per kickoff return. He did not play football during his senior year after transferring to a different school.

== College career ==
Cason accepted a football scholarship from Illinois State University. As a freshman in 1998, he posted 124 carries for 728 yards and 8 touchdowns, while making 23 receptions for 230 yards. As a sophomore in 1999, he had 45 carries for 378 rushing yards (third on the team) and 6 touchdowns, 34 receptions for 278 yards and 2 touchdowns, along with a 28.1-yard average on kickoff returns, ranking him seventh in NCAA Division I-AA.

As a junior in 2000, he was suspended for the season after being ruled academically ineligible. The next year he declared for the NFL draft

== Professional career ==
Pre-draft measurables
Height	Weight	40-yard dash
5 ft 8 3/4 in (1.75 m)	196 lb (89 kg)	4.43 s
All values from Pro Day

=== St. Louis Rams (first stint) ===
Cason was signed as an undrafted free agent by the St. Louis Rams after the 2001 NFL draft and was moved to wide receiver. He returned 4 kickoffs for 73 yards in the season opener. He was waived on September 26 and signed to the practice squad. He was released on October 1.

=== Kansas City Chiefs ===
On October 3, 2001, he was signed to the Kansas City Chiefs' practice squad.

=== Detroit Lions (first stint) ===
On November 19, 2001, he was signed by the Detroit Lions from the Chiefs' practice squad, to replace an injured Brian Calhoun. He played in the last five games, tallying 11 carries for 31 yards and 4 receptions for 32 yards.

In 2002, his first career start came in the season opener against the Miami Dolphins, making 2 receptions for 37 yards, including a 19-yard catch. He suffered meniscus damage in his right knee during practice on September 19, which required arthroscopic surgery. He was deactivated against the Green Bay Packers and the New Orleans Saints. He returned to practice on October 7. He led the Lions with a career-high 57 receiving yards on 3 catches against the Chicago Bears, but suffered a right ankle sprain. The injury kept him inactive against the Buffalo Bills. A sprained right MCL limited him to two receptions for 17 yards against the [[N.Y Jets]] and kept him inactive for the next 3 games. With running back James Stewart sidelined due to injury, Cason was given the starter job against the Tampa Bay Buccaneers, posting a season-high 62 rushing yards on 10 carries (6.2 avg.), while having a run of 40 yards and a career-long reception of 37 yards.

During the season, he rushed 26 times for 107 yards (4.1-yard average), had 19 receptions for 88 yards (15.2-yard average) and 2 touchdowns, while returning 2 kicks with an average of 24.0 yards. On April 27, 2003, he was traded to the Dallas Cowboys in exchange for a seventh-round draft choice (#236-Brandon Drumm).

=== Dallas Cowboys ===
In 2003, he reunited with Maurice Carthon who was his offensive coordinator with the Detroit Lions. He earned the team's third-down back role over Michael Wiley. In the season opener against the Atlanta Falcons, he took his first carry 63 yards for a touchdown, the longest run by a Cowboy during the season. He finished the Falcons game with a career-high 77 rushing yards on two carries and also had 2 receptions for 29 yards. He was declared inactive against the Buffalo Bills and New England Patriots.

He led all running backs with 25 yards on four carries (6.4 yard avg.) against the Miami Dolphins on Thanksgiving Day, while adding two receptions for 17 yards. He played in 10 games, before suffering an injury to the anterior cruciate ligament and medial meniscus in his right knee during practice on December 3 and was placed on injured reserve on December 9. He was replaced with rookie Erik Bickerstaff. Cason finished the season with career-highs in carries (40), rushing yards (220) per carry average (5.5), rushing touchdowns (2), kickoff returns (5) and kickoff return yards (81). He also had 17 receptions for 142 yards.

He was released on August 31, 2004.

=== Arizona Cardinals ===
On September 1, 2004, he was claimed off waivers by the Arizona Cardinals. He was released on September 5.

=== St. Louis Rams (second stint) ===
In December 2004, he was signed by the St. Louis Rams to provide depth while Marshall Faulk and Steven Jackson were limited with bruised knees. He played mostly as a kick returner, making 14 returns for a 22.1-yard average. In 2005, Cason rushed for 65 yards and one touchdown. He was not re-signed after the season.

=== Detroit Lions (second stint) ===
On November 9, 2006, he was signed as a free agent by the Detroit Lions. Due to an injury to Kevin Jones, he started his first game in a Week 16 loss against the Chicago Bears and rushed for 31 yards on five carries. He was declared inactive in 2 games.

On March 7, 2007, he was signed to a one-year contract. He was released on September 1. He was re-signed on September 12. Cason was on the active roster as their kick returner on special teams, in place of Eddie Drummond, who had left for the Kansas City Chiefs. He was released on September 25. He was re-signed on October 4. He was cut on October 21. He was re-signed on October 24.

On March 5, 2008, he was signed to a one-year contract. He was placed on the injured reserve list with an ankle injury on August 30. He returned later in the season to appear in 7 games and was mainly used to return kickoffs. On March 9, 2009, he re-signed with the Lions. He was released on September 4.

=== Florida Tuskers ===
In September 2010, he signed with the Florida Tuskers of the United Football League. He was a backup running back, tallying 37 carries for 94 yards and one touchdown.

== Personal life ==
In 2015, his Trinity Christian School – Cedar Hill (Cedar Hill, Texas) team won the Texas Association of Private and Parochial Schools Division II state title with a 12–1 record. Cason resigned as the team's coach in 2018.

In 2020, Cason and Don Majkowski filed a lawsuit against the NFL and the NFLPA over cuts made to their disability payments. It was dismissed in May 2021 by U.S. District Court Judge Trevor N. McFadden.
