= Mario Edwards =

American football player and coach (born 1975)

Rockwall-Heath High School
- Title: Head of recruiting, secondary coach

Personal information
- Born: December 1, 1975 (age 50); Clayton County, Georgia, U.S.
- Listed height: 6 ft 0 in (1.83 m)
- Listed weight: 199 lb (90 kg)

Career information
- High school: Pascagoula (Pascagoula, Mississippi)
- College: Florida State
- NFL draft: 2000: 6th round, 180th overall pick

Career history

Playing
- Dallas Cowboys (2000–2003); Tampa Bay Buccaneers (2004); Miami Dolphins (2005)*
- * Offseason or practice squad member only

Coaching
- W.W. Samuell High School (2009) Assistant coach; Billy Ryan High School (2010-2011) Assistant coach; Florida State (2012–2019) Director of player development; Rockwall-Heath High School (2020-2025) Head of recruiting & secondary coach; Mississippi Valley State University (2025-present) Defensive passing game coordinator

Awards and highlights
- BCS national champion (1999); First-team All-ACC (1999); Second-team All-ACC (1998)

Career NFL statistics
- Total tackles: 185
- Fumble recoveries: 3
- Pass deflections: 20
- Interceptions: 4
- Defensive touchdowns: 2
- Stats at Pro Football Reference

Mario Lashun Edwards Sr. (born December 1, 1975) is an American former professional football player who was a cornerback in the National Football League (NFL) for the Dallas Cowboys, Tampa Bay Buccaneers, and Miami Dolphins. He played college football for the Florida State Seminoles and was selected in the sixth round of the 2000 NFL draft by the Cowboys.

== Early life ==
Edwards attended Pascagoula High School, where he played at cornerback. As a senior, he had 61 tackles, 4 interceptions and 14 passes defensed. He received All-American and All-state honors.

He accepted a football scholarship from Florida State University. As a true freshman, he totaled 6 tackles. He blocked a punt that he returned for a 24-yard touchdown against the University of North Carolina.

As a sophomore, he was a backup at right cornerback, tallying 14 tackles, 3 passes defensed and one fumble recovery. He missed the 1997 season as a redshirt.

As a junior, he started the final 10 games at left cornerback, registering 20 tackles, 6 interceptions (ranked eighth in the nation), 11 passes defensed (led the team) and helping the team earn a No. 1 national ranking in pass defense. He had 5 tackles and 3 passes defensed against the University of Southern California. He set a school and tied a conference record, by making 4 interceptions in a single-game against Wake Forest University. He played in the National Championship game, where the Seminoles lost to the University of Tennessee.

As a senior, he posted 19 tackles, 9 passes defensed (led the team) and one forced fumble, while being a part of the 1999 national championship team. He had 4 passes defensed against the University of Virginia. He compiled 3 passes defended in the 2000 Sugar Bowl 46–29 win against Virginia Tech.

== Professional career ==
Pre-draft measurables
Height	Weight	Arm length	Hand span	40-yard dash	20-yard shuttle	Three-cone drill	Vertical jump	Broad jump	Bench press
6 ft 0 1/8 in (1.83 m)	191 lb (87 kg)	31 in (0.79 m)	10 in (0.25 m)	4.46 s	4.55 s	7.44 s	32.5 in (0.83 m)	10 ft 0 in (3.05 m)	32 reps
All values from NFL Combine

=== Dallas Cowboys ===
Edwards was selected by the Dallas Cowboys in the sixth round with the 180th overall of the 2000 NFL draft, after he dropped because of a poor performance in the 1998 Fiesta Bowl, combined with injuries and inconsistent play in his senior season.

As a rookie, he played mainly on special teams, making 11 tackles (tied for fourth on the team). He suffered a strained left hamstring in the third preseason game against the Oakland Raiders, that forced him to miss the rest of the preseason and the first 4 regular season contests. In the season finale he started at left cornerback against the Tennessee Titans, making 3 tackles and one pass defensed.

In 2001, Edwards became the team's regular starter at left cornerback, helping the team rank third in pass defense in the NFL. He had 58 tackles (eighth on the team) and 11 passes defensed (led the team), contributing to the defense statistically ranking number four overall in the NFL. He returned his first career interception 71 yards for a touchdown in the seventh game against the New York Giants.

In 2002, he registered 72 tackles (eighth on the team), 2 interceptions (third on the team) and 8 passes defensed (tied for fourth on the team). In 2003, he started all 16 games at right cornerback, contributing to the defense statistically ranking number one overall in the NFL. He missed one game with a quad contusion. He had 6 tackles and one pass defensed against the Tennessee Titans. He made 6 tackles and one pass defensed against the Arizona Cardinals. He had 10 tackles and one fumble recovery against the Jacksonville Jaguars. He made 2 interceptions and 3 passes defensed in the twelfth game against the Washington Redskins.

In 2003, he started all 16 games, recording 45 tackles (ninth on the team), one quarterback pressure, one interception and 8 passes defensed. While with the Cowboys, he started 47 games, posting 178 tackles, 4 interceptions (2 returned for touchdowns) and 28 passes defensed.

=== Tampa Bay Buccaneers ===
On April 9, 2004, Edwards signed with the Tampa Bay Buccaneers as a free agent. He played in 15 games with 3 starts when the team opened in a nickel defense, while collecting 22 tackles and no interceptions. On March 1, 2005, he was released for salary cap reasons.

=== Miami Dolphins ===
On April 4, 2005, he signed with the Miami Dolphins, to provide depth after Patrick Surtain was traded to the Kansas City Chiefs. He was waived prior to the start of the season on September 4.

== NFL career statistics ==
Legend
**Bold**	Career high

=== Regular season ===
Year	Team	Games		Tackles					Interceptions					Fumbles			
Year	Team	GP	GS	Cmb	Solo	Ast	Sck	TFL	Int	Yds	TD	Lng	PD	FF	FR	Yds	TD
2000	DAL	11	1	10	10	0	0.0	0	0	0	0	0	2	0	0	0	0
2001	DAL	**16**	15	49	42	**7**	0.0	**2**	1	**71**	**1**	**71**	7	0	**1**	**2**	0
2002	DAL	15	15	**57**	**53**	4	0.0	**2**	**2**	29	0	29	**9**	0	**1**	0	0
2003	DAL	**16**	**16**	42	37	5	0.0	0	1	27	**1**	27	**9**	0	0	0	0
2004	TAM	15	3	27	22	5	0.0	0	0	0	0	0	4	0	**1**	0	0
		73	50	185	164	21	0.0	4	4	127	2	71	31	0	3	2	0

=== Playoffs ===
Year	Team	Games		Tackles					Interceptions					Fumbles			
Year	Team	GP	GS	Cmb	Solo	Ast	Sck	TFL	Int	Yds	TD	Lng	PD	FF	FR	Yds	TD
2003	DAL	**1**	**1**	**5**	**4**	**1**	0.0	0	0	0	0	0	0	0	0	0	0
		1	1	5	4	1	0.0	0	0	0	0	0	0	0	0	0	0

== Coaching career ==
In 2009, he was an assistant football coach at W. W. Samuell High School in Dallas, Texas. From 2010 to 2012, he was an assistant football coach at Billy Ryan High School in Denton, Texas. From 2012 to 2019, he was the director of player development for the Florida State football program. In 2020, he was hired to be a secondary coach at North Forney High School in Forney, Texas.

== Personal life ==
Edwards's son, Mario Jr., also played for Florida State University and like his father, won a national championship with the Seminoles. He currently plays defensive end for the Houston Texans of the NFL. He is also the father of Dalen, Angel, and Gianni Edwards.
