= List of recipients of honorary degrees from Central Connecticut State University =

Central Connecticut State University has awarded 55 honorary doctoral degrees since 1985. Awardees have included the CEOs or chairmen of seven major corporations, eight heads of state, and a variety of others. About half of these degrees have been awarded at commencement exercises at the university, and in most such cases, the conferee has given the commencement address.

Although significant non-degree honors have historically been awarded by the institution, honorary doctorates were not conferred until after Central Connecticut State College was renamed Central Connecticut State University in 1983. U.S. President Jimmy Carter became the first recipient on April 16, 1985, receiving a Doctor of Humane Letters.

== List of recipients ==
awardee		date	degree*
Shigenori Adachihara‡	Mayor, Atsugi City, Japan	05/23/1990	L.H.D.
Rt. Rev. Justice Akrofi†	Bishop of Accra, Ghana	05/18/2000	L.H.D.
József Antall Jr.	Prime Minister of the Republic of Hungary	09/30/1991	LL.D.
Leszek Balcerowicz	Professor, Warsaw School of Economics and former Deputy Prime Minister of Poland	5/21/2011	Sc.D.
Ernest L. Boyer	President, Carnegie Foundation for the Advancement of Teaching	10/05/1987	L.H.D.
J. William Burns	Commissioner, Connecticut Department of Transportation	01/03/1995	LL.D.
George H. W. Bush^{a}	President of the United States	03/11/1999	LL.D.
George W. Bush	President of the United States	04/18/2001	LL.D.
Alexander M. Butman	Executive director, Emergency Training Institute	04/28/1994	Sc.D.
Dave Campo†	Head coach, Dallas Cowboys	05/22/1999	D.H.P.Ed.
Jimmy Carter^{a}	President of the United States	04/16/1985	L.H.D.
Noam Chomsky	Professor of Linguistics, Massachusetts Institute of Technology	11/04/2003	L.H.D.
Young Seek Choue‡	Chancellor, Kyung Hee University	10/22/1991	L.H.D.
Chungwon Choue‡	President, Kyung Hee University	05/23/1998	L.H.D.
Mong Koo Chung	Chairman, Hyundai Precision and Industry Company	05/26/1989	L.H.D.
Simon A. Clarke	Education Advisor to UNESCO	05/24/1991	L.H.D.
Lemuel Rodney Custis	Capitan (Connecticut Tuskegee Airman)	05/26/2001	L.H.D.
Donald W. Davis	Chairman, The Stanley Works	05/26/1989	L.H.D.
Rainer Dieterich	Universität der Bundeswehr, Hamburg	05/25/2002	Sc.D.
Richard Fichman†	Developer, Quick Sight method of cataract removal	12/16/2023	L.H.D.
Bruno Ficili	Commissioner of Education, Siracusa, Sicily	10/23/1996	L.H.D.
Gerald R. Ford^{a}	President of the United States	03/23/1988	L.H.D.
Charles T. Fote	CEO and chairman, First Data Corp	05/19/2018	L.H.D.
Mary Hatwood Futrell	President, National Education Association	10/04/1988	L.H.D.
Joseph J. Grano Jr.	Chairman and CEO, Centurion Holdings, LLC	05/19/2007	L.H.D.
Harry Jack Gray	Chairman and CEO, United Technologies Corporation	05/17/1985	D.S.Sc
Edward T. Hall	1st Lieutenant (Connecticut Tuskegee Airman)	05/26/2001	L.H.D.
Merle W. Harris†	CCSU Interim President, 1995–1996; Deputy Connecticut Commissioner of Higher Education	12/17/2022	Ed.L.
E. Dorrit Hoffleit	Senior Research Astronomer Emeritus, Yale University	10/20/1998	Sc.D.
Benjamin L. Hooks	Executive director, NAACP	05/20/1988	L.H.D.
C. J. Huang	Chairman, C. J. Huang Foundation	05/10/1990	L.H.D.
F. Don James	CCSU President Emeritus	10/16/2003	L.H.D.
Eric Jensen	Deputy to the Under-Secretary-General, United Nations	05/27/1993	L.H.D.
Peter G. Kelly	Senior Principal, Updike, Kelly & Spellacy	02/25/2003	LL.D.
Jeane Kirkpatrick^{a}	United States Representative to the United Nations	04/04/1991	L.H.D.
Henry A. Kissinger^{a}	Secretary of State of the United States	03/24/1987	D.S.Sc.
Michael S. Knapp†	President and CEO, CitiFinancial	05/25/2002	D.C.Sc.
Phyllis Macpherson-Russell†	Minister of Education, Jamaica	12/04/1999	Sc.D.
Frances P. Mainella†	Director, National Park Service	05/23/2002	D.P.S.
Paul J. McQuillan^{,}	Attorney, Januszewski, McQuillan & DeNigris	02/23/2004	D.C.J.
George J. Mitchell^{a}	U.S. Senator and Senate Majority Leader	04/12/2000	LL.D.
Brian Mulroney^{a}	Prime Minister of Canada	04/26/1994	D.S.Sc.
Connie Nappier Jr.	Flight Officer (Connecticut Tuskegee Airman)	05/26/2001	L.H.D.
Antonia Coello Novello	Surgeon General of the United States	05/28/1993	Sc.D.
Vincent O’Leary	President, State University of New York at Albany	05/28/1994	D.S.Sc.
Rabbi Henry Okolica	CCSU Campus Clergy	05/22/2003	D.P.S.
Scott Pioli†	former assistant general manager, Atlanta Falcons	05/18/2019	L.H.D.
Irma Margarita Nevares de Rosselló	First Lady of Puerto Rico	05/20/1999	L.H.D.
Franz J. Rothenbiller	Lord Mayor of Rastatt, Baden-Württemberg, Germany	06/06/1991	L.H.D.
Helmut Schmidt^{a}	Chancellor of the Federal Republic of Germany	04/28/1993	L.H.D.
Angelo Tomasso Jr.	Chairman and CEO, Tilcon, Inc	05/25/1990	L.H.D.
Francis T. Vincent Jr.^{a}	Commissioner, Major League Baseball	04/28/1992	L.H.D.
Cecile A. Walden	Principal, Sam Sharpe Teachers’ College, Montego Bay, Jamaica	05/27/2004	Ped.D.
Lech Wałęsa^{a}	President of Poland	04/10/1996	L.H.D.
Lowell P. Weicker Jr.	US Senator and Governor of Connecticut	05/27/2009	D.P.S.
Bertram W. Wilson	Lieutenant Colonel (Connecticut Tuskegee Airman)	05/26/2001	L.H.D.
Andrzej Wiszniewski	Rector, Technical University of Wrocław	05/28/1993	Sc.D.
Rt. Rev. Msgr. John Paul Wodarski	Pastor Emeritus, Holy Cross Church, New Britain	04/29/1999	L.H.D.

=== Notes ===
† recipient is a CCSU graduate
‡ recipient represented a partner of CCSU's International Affairs Center and Connecticut Institute for Asian and American Studies^{,}
^{a} Honorary degree awarded in connection with recipient's delivery of the Robert C. Vance Distinguished Lecture.
∗ abbreviated degree names:

D.C.J.: Doctor of Criminal Justice; D.C.Sc.: Doctor of Commercial Science; D.H.P.Ed.: Doctor of Health and Physical Education; D.P.S.: Doctor of Public Service; D.S.Sc: Doctor of Social Science	Ed.L.: Doctor of Educational Leadership; L.H.D.: Doctor of Humane Letters; LL.D.: Doctor of Laws; Ped.D.: Doctor of Pedagogy; Sc.D.: Doctor of Science

== President's Medal ==
CCSU presidents have presented other honorary awards such as the President's Medal, "the university's highest non-academic distinction". While there does not appear to be an official, published list of recipients, they include

- Provincial president Bruno Marziano of Siracusa, Sicily, who assisted CCSU in enrolling Sicilian students in CCSU's MBA program, "for his leadership and service to the University, to international endeavors and to the province of Siracusa", in 2002;
- Hartford Courant journalist Stan Simpson for Leadership and distinction in Journalism in Public Affairs, in 2003; and
- Sue Ann Collins, a senior vice president and chief actuary at TIAA-CREF, and member of the board of directors of the CCSU Foundation, in 2018.
