= Commencement at Central Connecticut State University =

Coordinates: 41.7685°N 72.6770°W

Central Connecticut State University's annual undergraduate commencement exercises are held on campus each May. From 1989 to 2016, separate graduation ceremonies were held for recipients of postgraduate degrees. Additional midyear undergraduate commencements were held at the end of the fall terms from 1988 to 1993 and at several other points in the university's history, most recently in 2024.

From 1884 to 1994, Spring commencement was held on the CCSU campus in New Britain, but due to a lack of space and concerns about the weather, it was moved to the Hartford Civic Center, which was renamed the XL Center in 2007 and the PeoplesBank Arena in 2025. Since 2018, commencement exercises have been divided into morning and afternoon sessions to accommodate increasing numbers of graduates and audience members. Due to the COVID-19 pandemic, the 2020 exercises were held virtually, and beginning in 2021, the ceremony was moved back to campus.

== History ==
Prior to moving to its present location on Stanley Street, the school, then known alternately as the "State Normal School" and the "New Britain Normal School," occupied what is now called the Camp School building in downtown New Britain.

The graduation ceremony for the first class (numbering five graduates) took place on October 1, 1851, in the old South Congregational Church. Commencements continued to be held off-campus until 1885. No ceremonies were held in 1868 or 1869, as the school's operations had been suspended by state officials. From about 1873 to 1885, two graduations were held each year: a "first class" in January and a "second class" in June. In 1884 the college moved into the new Camp building. From that time until 1925, an average of about 80 students (nearly all young women) received teaching diplomas each year at a graduation ceremony in the school's assembly hall on a weekday morning in late June.

=== On-campus commencements at the Stanley Street Campus (1925-1993) ===
From 1925 to 1935, commencement was held in the auditorium of the school's new building on Stanley Street. The first outdoor commencement ceremonies were held in 1936, in the college's amphitheater. The arrangement of an outdoor ceremony—held indoors in case of rain—continued until the 1990s. Over time, the location of the outdoor exercises included the college quadrangle and first of two athletics fields known as "Arute field." By the late 1940s, a building named "Memorial Hall" was used for those commencement exercises moved indoors because of rain, such as the 1955 event. In 1959, the college, which had been renamed "Teachers College of Connecticut" in 1933, became "Central Connecticut State College".

When it rained on the day of the 1963 graduation, the ceremonies were moved into the campus' newest structure, Herbert D. Welte Hall. Although Welte Hall was employed from 1989 to 2013 for CCSU's annual graduate commencement, as well as for graduations of Tunxis Community College, Charter Oak State College, nursing and police academies and high schools, it was soon too small to serve as an indoor backup facility for CCSU's annual commencement.

By 1965, with the number of CCSC graduates having doubled to 684 since 1960, the quadrangle could barely hold the more than 2,000 attendees, and the following year the exercises were moved to another new building, Harrison J. Kaiser Hall, which had been dedicated September 18, 1965—but soon the annual graduation ceremonies threatened to outgrow even Kaiser, which was designed to seat 4,500 spectators (not including those on the gym floor). One newspaper report referred to "3,500 people stacked up to 22 rows high," "stewing" in the June heat at the 1967 event; another article the following year describes "the estimated 5,700 jammed into steaming Kaiser Hall for the program."

From 1969 to 1993, undergraduate commencement took place on Arute Field, a football facility in the northeast corner of campus, with the gymnasium in Kaiser Hall used occasionally in the event of rain.

As graduating classes continued to get larger (e.g., 322 graduated in 1960, 696 in 1966, 1274 in 1969, and over 2400 in 1975), officials stopped reading the names of individual graduates during the undergraduate exercises. The reading of names was reinstated in 1992. The last on-campus commencement was held on Friday, May 28, 1993. Antonia C. Novello, US Surgeon General, was the commencement speaker; she and Andrzej Wiszniewski, the Rector of the Technical University of Wrocław, were also awarded honorary doctorates at the ceremony.

=== The move to Hartford (1994-2019) ===
The discussion to relocate CCSU's annual commencement ceremonies to the Hartford Civic Center was explained by Kauffman in the Hartford Courant:

For the first time, Central Connecticut State University in New Britain will hold its graduation exercises off campus. They will be at the Hartford Civic Center May 28 [1994]. The reason: a space squeeze on campus. When the weather is good, commencement is at Arute Field, the school's football stadium. When it rains, ceremonies are moved indoors to Kaiser gymnasium, where graduates are limited to two guest tickets.

A few months after the first Hartford commencement in 1994, CCSU's administration announced the discontinuation of December commencements, citing the wishes of December graduates to participate in the Hartford ceremony in May. In October, 600 CCSU students signed a petition to reinstate the event, which was not held. However, December commencements were begun again a few years later.

Before Hartford graduations became institutionalized, it was believed by some that they would be temporary—that "whenever CCSU has an adequate place on campus, the ceremonies can be moved back." Indeed, since 1994, the state of Connecticut has funded a number of studies to address the university's lack of space. One, in 2004, explored the possibility of a CCSU sports arena at the present location of the New Brite Plaza Shopping Center, about 1.6 miles (2.6 km) from the main campus.

Two changes took effect in the 2017-2018 academic year. First, graduate and undergraduate commencements were co-located; the last graduate-only commencement was held in May 2017. Second, May ceremonies at the PeoplesBank Arena were divided into two separate sessions to accommodate the growing number of graduates and family members who wished to attend; an on-campus Winter commencement was also added for both undergraduate and graduate students.

=== Covid-19 and the Return to Campus (2020-present) ===
The 2020 ceremonies were postponed due to the COVID-19 pandemic. Shortly before the traditional commencement date in May, the university secured permission to schedule exercises for Sunday, October 11, at the XL Center.; but due to state COVID guidelines, the event was cancelled in September and replaced with a virtual ceremony which was held on Saturday, October 17.

In April 2021, with the loosening of state guidelines governing in-person gatherings, the university announced that commencement exercises would be held on campus for the first time since 1993. To ensure social distancing, a total of four commencements (one for each of the University's four academic schools) were conducted over two days at Arute Field. This was reduced to two ceremonies on one day in 2022. In December of that year, a winter commencement was held in Welte Hall for the first time since 2018.

== Order of Exercises ==
The ceremony is declared "open" by the president of CCSU's faculty senate. This is followed by the national anthem, sung by the CCSU University Singers. Other preliminaries have included an invocation by a member of the campus ministry, greetings from state officials, and brief remarks from the president of the CCSU Alumni Association. Greetings are also presented by students representing the graduands and by a representative of the Board of Regents of the state university system.

This is followed by a commencement address by a previously announced speaker, the singing of the Alma Mater, and the conferral of degrees. At Hartford commencements, a pair of announcers (often including professor Gil Gigliotti) read the names of each graduate present at the ceremony, after which the event ends with the drop of hundreds of balloons from the ceiling of the PeoplesBank Arena. In 2018 a ceremonial recession, led by the university's athletic mascot, was added to the event.

CCSU's Wind Symphony provides processional and incidental music before and during the ceremony. Both the Wind Symphony and University Singers perform under the direction of professors from CCSU's Department of Music.

The procession includes the University Mace (usually borne by the president of CCSU's faculty senate) and occasionally the University Staff. Peter J. Vernesoni, a CCSU graduate and professor from 1971 to 2003, designed and carved both of these artifacts.

== CCSU Spring commencement speakers since 1994 ==
=== Exercises in Hartford (1994–2019) ===
CCSU's commencement speakers are often successful alumni such as Congressman John B. Larson (D-1st), CitiFinancial CEO Michael Knapp, and CCSU professor Kristine Larsen. In 2018 two ceremonies were held on May 19, each honoring both graduate and undergraduate students: a morning session for the liberal arts, social and natural sciences, engineering, and technology majors; and an afternoon session for those majoring in business, education, and other professional studies. This was also true in 2019.

The table below lists the commencement speaker for each commencement while the ceremony was held annually at the XL Center in Hartford, from 1994 through 2019. Each ceremony took place on a Saturday unless otherwise noted.

date^{a}	address given by
5/28/94	Eunice S. Groark, Lieutenant Governor of Connecticut and gubernatorial candidate
5/27/95	Barbara B. Kennelly, US Congresswoman (D-5th)
5/22/96	Ellen Goodman, essayist, the Boston Globe (Wednesday-night commencement)
5/22/97	John J. Sweeney, president, AFL–CIO (Thursday-night commencement)
5/23/98	Chungwon Choue^{b}, president, Kyung Hee University
5/22/99	Dave Campo^{b,c}, coach, Dallas Cowboys
5/20/00	John G. Rowland, Governor of Connecticut (150th CCSU undergraduate commencement)
5/26/01	none, (scheduled speaker John Larson was working on a tax bill in Washington)
5/25/02	Michael S. Knapp^{b}, CEO, Citifinancial
5/24/03	John B. Larson^{c}, US Congressman (D-1st)
5/22/04	Kristine Larsen^{c}, CCSU professor of Astronomy
5/21/05	Raul Allegue^{c}, vice president / lobbyist, Travelers Insurance
5/20/06	Bob Englehart^{d}, editorial cartoonist, the Hartford Courant
5/19/07	Joseph J. Grano Jr.^{b}, CEO, Centurion Holdings
5/17/08	M. Jodi Rell, Governor of Connecticut
5/23/09	Carol A. Ammon^{c}, founder, Endo Pharmaceuticals
5/22/10	Heather Munro Prescott, CSU Professor of History
5/21/11	Leszek Balcerowicz^{b}, former Deputy Prime Minister of Poland
5/18/12	Dannel P. Malloy, Governor of Connecticut (Friday-night commencement)
5/18/13	Gregory S. Babe, former CEO, Bayer Corporation (North America)
5/17/14	Erin Brady^{c}, sitting Miss USA
5/16/15	John B. Larson^{c}, US Congressman (D-1st)
5/21/16	John W. Miller, president, CCSU
5/20/17	Zulma R. Toro, president, CCSU
5/19/18	morning: Sue Ann Collins^{b,c}, senior vice president and chief actuary, TIAA-CREF
5/19/18	afternoon: Charles T. Fote^{b}, former CEO and chairman, First Data Corp
5/18/19	morning: Ned Lamont, Governor of Connecticut
5/18/19	afternoon: Scott Pioli^{b,c}, former assistant general manager, Atlanta Falcons

Much of the information in this table was compiled from CCSU's annual Commencement Exercises programs.

Notes: (a) Commencements took place on Saturday mornings unless noted otherwise; (b) speaker awarded an honorary degree or other recognition during the ceremony; (c) speaker graduated from CCSU.

=== Exercises on campus (2020–present) ===
Beginning with the COVID-impacted 2020 graduation, nearly every commencement speaker has been a CCSU graduate.

date^{a}	address given by
10/17/20	Kathleen C. Greider^{c}, superintendent, Farmington (CT) Public Schools. (Virtual commencement for May 2020 graduates.)
5/21	To comply with COVID-related state regulations, a total of four socially-distanced commencement ceremonies were held.
5/21	5/22/21: Emily Gregonis^{c}, charge nurse, Beth Israel Deaconess Medical Center.
5/21	5/23/21: Stephanie Blozy, owner, Fleet Feet, a West Hartford running apparel store.
From 2022 forward, CCSU resumed the practice of holding two ceremonies.
5/14/22	morning: Troy McMullen^{c}, executive editor, ABC.
5/14/22	afternoon: Michele “Mickey” Perez^{c}, industrial manager, Pratt & Whitney.
5/13/23^{,}	morning: Jannette Carey^{c}, cellular biologist, Princeton University.
5/13/23^{,}	afternoon: William Berloni^{c}, entertainer; recipient of an honorary Tony for animal training.
5/11/24	both ceremonies: Peter Rosa^{c}, Lawrence Hall^{c}, and William Bosworth^{c}, representing three generations of CCSU graduates. (175th anniversary of the founding of CCSU.)
5/17/25	both ceremonies: Mohammed K. Yusuf^{c}, vice president of North America Cloud and Infrastructure, Oracle Corporation.
5/16/26	both ceremonies: Brian K. Fowler^{c}, cardiology fellow, Ohio State University Wexner Medical Center.

Much of the information in this table was compiled from CCSU's annual Commencement Exercises programs.

Notes: (a) Commencement events took place on Saturday at Arute Field, unless noted otherwise; (c) speaker graduated from CCSU.

== Other commencement speakers ==
Through 2017, a separate graduate commencement was held on campus, usually within a week of the undergraduate ceremony. Since 2017, December commencements have also been held.

Academic year	Event date	Address given by	Degrees conferred
1983-84	May 19	James A. Frost, President, Connecticut State University System (134th CCSU commencement)	all
2005–06	Dec. 17	John W. Miller, President^{a}, CCSU	graduate
2005–06	May 25	Bob Englehart, editorial cartoonist, the Hartford Courant	graduate
2006–07	Dec. 16	Denise L. Nappier, Connecticut State Treasurer	all
2007–08	Dec. 15	Christopher S. Murphy, US Congressman (D-5th)	all
2008–09	May 27	Lowell P. Weicker Jr. ^{b}, former Governor of Connecticut	graduate
2009–10	May 27	Timothy G. Reagan, CSU professor of Teacher Education	graduate
2010–11	May 25	Michael P. Meotti, commissioner, Connecticut Department of Higher Education	graduate
2011–12	May 16	Michael Foran ^{c}, principal, New Britain High School, and 2012 National High School Principal of the Year	graduate
2012–13	May 16	Robbin E. Smith, CCSU professor of Political Science	graduate
2013–14	May 15	Angelo Messina ^{c,d}, vice president, Global Financial Services, United Technologies Corporation	graduate
2014–15	May 14	Carol A. Ammon^{c}, founder, Endo Pharmaceuticals	graduate
2015–16	May 19	John W. Miller, president, CCSU	graduate
2016–17	May 18	Zulma R. Toro, president, CCSU	graduate
2017–18	Dec. 16	Ululy Rafael Martinez^{c}, attorney and member of CCSU's Task Force on Sexual Misconduct, Bullying, and Campus Climate	all
2018–19	Dec. 14	Miguel A. Cardona^{c}, Connecticut Commissioner of Education	all
2022-23	Dec. 17	Erin Stewart^{c}, Mayor of New Britain, Connecticut	all
2023-24	Dec. 16	Richard Fichman^{b,c}, Developer of the Quick Sight method of cataract removal	all
2024-25	Dec. 14	Michelle Halloran Gilman^{c}, Commissioner, Connecticut Department of Administrative Services	all
2025-26	Dec. 13	Megan Clark Torrey^{c}, CEO, World Affairs Council of Connecticut	all

These events were held on campus at Welte Auditorium except for graduate commencements in 2014 through 2017, which took place in the Kaiser Gymnasium.
The information in this table was compiled from CCSU's annual Commencement Exercises programs.
Notes: (a) Miller was the president-designate until the "Ceremony of Investiture," which preceded his address; thus he is listed as "President" here. His de facto presidency had begun the previous June. The degrees were conferred after the investiture and address. (b) speaker awarded an honorary degree during the ceremony; (c) speaker graduated from CCSU; (d) speaker's daughter graduated from CCSU.

== Recipients of CCSU Honorary Degrees ==
CCSU has awarded more than fifty honorary doctoral degrees since 1985. Awardees have included the CEOs or Chairmen of six major corporations, eight heads of state, and a variety of others. About half of these have been awarded at commencement ceremonies, and in most of these cases, the conferee has given the commencement address. Although significant non-degree honors have historically been awarded by the institution, honorary doctorates were not conferred until after Central Connecticut State College was renamed Central Connecticut State University in 1983. U.S. President Jimmy Carter became the first recipient on April 16, 1985, receiving a Doctor of Humane Letters.

In addition to Carter, U.S. Presidents Gerald R. Ford (L.H.D., 1988), George H. W. Bush (LL.D., 1999), and George W. Bush (LL.D., 2001) received honorary CCSU degrees. József Antall Jr., Prime Minister of the Republic of Hungary (LL.D., 1991); Brian Mulroney, Prime Minister of Canada (D.S.Sc., 1994); Helmut Schmidt, Chancellor of the Federal Republic of Germany (L.H.D., 1993); and Lech Wałęsa, President of Poland (L.H.D., 1996) also received honorary CCSU degrees. Each of these was a former head of state of the conferral of his degree except for Antall and George W. Bush.
