= Robert C. Vance Distinguished Lecture Series =

American lectures

The Robert C. Vance Distinguished Lecture Series was a series of 23 lectures between 1983 and 2013 at Central Connecticut State University. Most of the speakers were either well-known journalists such as Anderson Cooper, Dan Rather, and Bob Woodward), or government figures, including Robert Gates, Rudolph Giuliani, and Shimon Peres. Three former U.S. Presidents have also been among the lecturers in the series.

The lecture series was named in honor of Robert C. Vance, publisher of the New Britain Herald from 1951 to 1959.

The original aim of the series was to bring to CCSU speakers from the field of journalism. Newscaster David Brinkley was scheduled to give the first Vance lecture in 1983, but was replaced only days before the lecture by Benjamin Bradlee.^{,} The twelve lecturers following Bradlee were well-known political figures, but since 2001, journalists have also been featured.

All costs for the series were covered by the Robert C. Vance Charitable Foundation, a private foundation founded in 1958. Lectures were free to the public, although in later years a paid reception and dinner with the lecturer was usually held before the lecture.

== Discontinuation ==
After the Rudolph Giuliani lecture in March 2013, the university's Faculty Senate, having “expressed its dissatisfaction with the lack of progressive speakers over the past few years,” created an ad hoc committee to recommend future speakers. However, the university and the Vance Foundation could not reach consensus on a speaker for 2014. The ad hoc committee submitted a list of potential speakers the following term, but again, no consensus was reached.

The university issued a news release dated December 9, 2015, stating that “The Robert C. Vance Lecture Series will be discontinued.” Although no reason was given for ending the series, it was noted that funding for the series had not been discontinued, and that these monies “will be redirected to the [Vance] Endowed Chair [in Journalism and Mass Communication] in support of critical initiatives that will have a more direct impact on CCSU students, faculty members, as well as the larger New Britain community.”

== List of Vance Lecturers ==
The following twenty-four speakers gave lectures in this series. There were twenty-three events, as William F. Buckley, Jr. and George McGovern appeared together in 1990. Former President of Ireland Mary Robinson is among the speakers the Vance Foundation has been unsuccessful in booking.

speaker		date
Benjamin Bradlee	executive editor (1968–91), the Washington Post	1983
Harold Wilson	Prime Minister of the United Kingdom (1964–70, 1974–76)	4/28/1984
Jimmy Carter^{a}	President of the United States (1977-1981); 2002 Nobel Peace Prize laureate	4/16/1985
Henry Kissinger^{a}	U.S. Secretary of State (1973-1977); 1973 Nobel Peace Prize co-laureate	3/24/1987
Gerald Ford^{a}	President of the United States (1974-1977)	3/23/1988
William F. Buckley, Jr.	Political author and commentator; founder, National Review (1951)	3/28/1990
George McGovern	U.S. Senator (1963-1981); 1972 presidential candidate	3/28/1990
Jeane Kirkpatrick^{a}	United States Representative to the United Nations (1981-1985)	4/4/1991
Fay Vincent^{a}	Commissioner of Major League Baseball (1989-1992)	4/28/1992
Helmut Schmidt^{a}	Chancellor of West Germany (1974-1982)	4/28/1993
Brian Mulroney^{a}	Prime Minister of Canada (1984-1993)	4/26/1994
Lech Wałęsa^{a}	President of Poland (1990-1995); 1983 Nobel Peace Prize laureate	4/10/1996
F. W. de Klerk	State President of South Africa (1989-1994); 1994 Nobel Peace Prize co-laureate	4/23/1997
George H. W. Bush^{a}	President of the United States (1989-1993)	3/11/1999
George Mitchell^{a}	U.S. Senator (1980-1995) and Senate Majority Leader (1989-1995)	4/12/2000
Bob Woodward	Reporter, editor, the Washington Post (1971-)	4/18/2001
Shimon Peres	Prime Minister (1995-1996) and President (2007-2014) of Israel; 1994 Nobel Peace Prize co-laureate	4/14/2003
Hugh Downs	Newscaster, NBC (1962-1971), ABC (1978-1999)	4/12/2005
Dan Rather	Anchor, CBS Evening News (1981-2005)	4/4/2007
Bob Dole	U.S. Senator (1969-1996); Senate Minority/Majority Leader (1985-1996); 1996 presidential candidate	4/8/2008
Anderson Cooper	Newscaster, CNN (2001-)	4/31/2009
Steve Forbes	Editor-in-chief, Forbes magazine (1990-); 2000 presidential candidate	4/28/2010
Robert Gates	U.S. Secretary of Defense (2006-2011)	11/8/2011
Rudolph Giuliani	Mayor of New York City (1994-2001); 2008 presidential candidate	3/14/2013

=== Notes ===
^{a} speaker received an Honorary degree from CCSU on the date of their lecture.

== Controversies ==
The Vance Lecture Series has been accused of conservative bias by members of the CCSU community.

- Eighteen of the 24 speakers have been government officials or political figures. Of the U.S. officials, three have been Democrats (Carter, McGovern, and Mitchell) and nine have been Republicans (Kissinger, Buckley, Ford, Kirkpatrick, Bush, Dole, Forbes, Gates, and Giuliani). The six foreign heads of government were evenly split on ideology (Wilson, Schmidt, and Peres represented left-center parties, while Mulroney, Wałęsa, and de Klerk were members of right-center parties).
- Five of the speakers represented the news media, which is routinely accused of liberal bias. Hugh Downs is generally viewed as a libertarian, while Woodward's ideology has been debated.^{,}^{,} Based on reputation, Bradlee, Cooper, and Rather are liberals.
- In his Vero Beach Newsweekly articles, the remaining speaker, former Baseball commissioner Fay Vincent, occasionally offers moderately conservative views^{,} but is generally nonpolitical.

In particular, the lectures of Kissinger, de Klerk, and Gates were met with protests.
