= Colleen Ward =

Colleen Ward may refer to:

- Colleen Ward (Miss Connecticut)
- Colleen Ward (psychologist)
