= Robert C. Vance =

Newspaper publisher and philanthropist

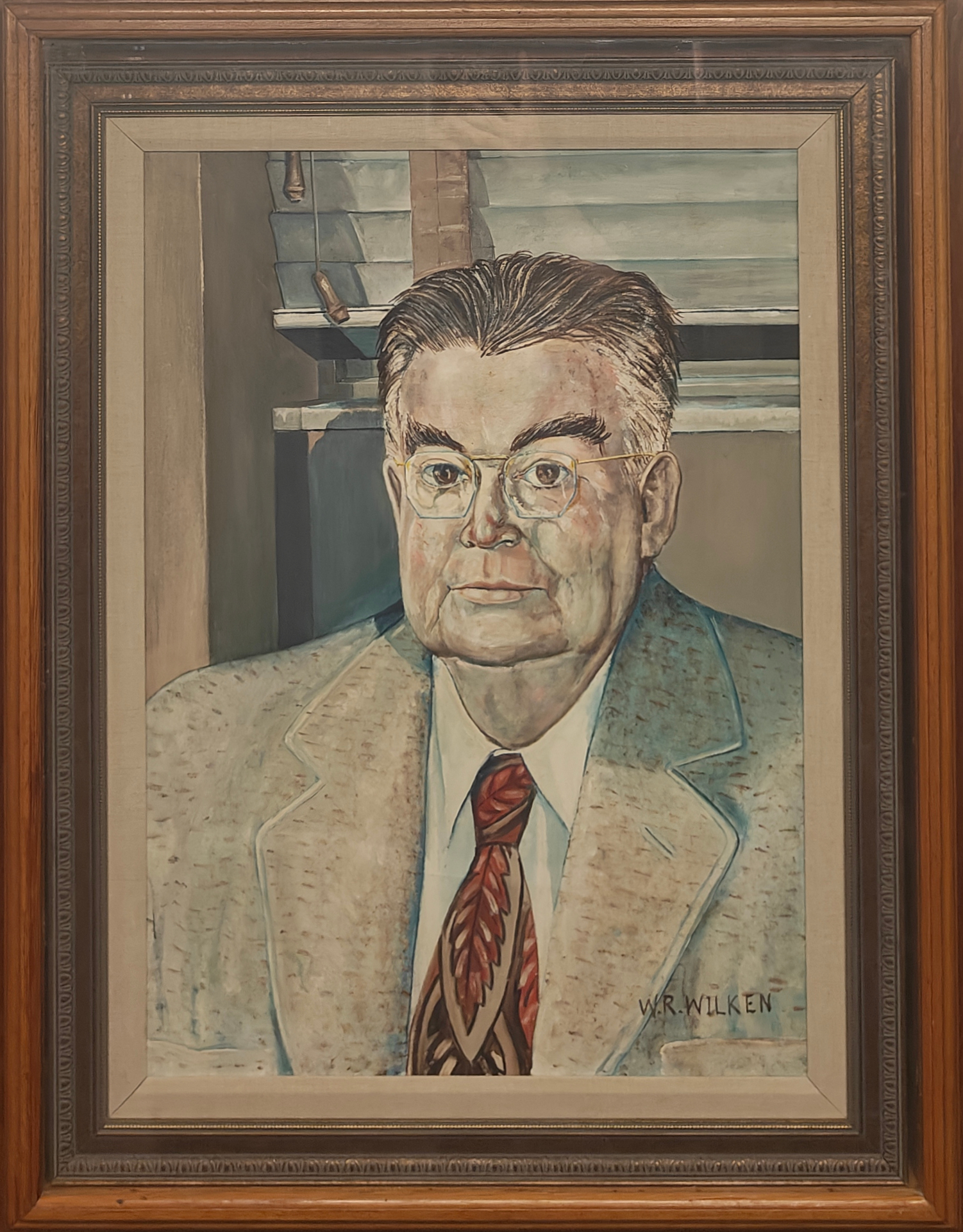
A portrait of Robert Vance by WR Wilken

Robert Cummings Vance (February 21, 1894 – November 4, 1959) was a Connecticut newspaper publisher and philanthropist.

== Background ==
He was the son of Robert Johnstone Vance, founder and publisher of the New Britain Herald from 1881 until his death in 1902. During his tenure as publisher, the elder Vance won a term in the U.S. Congress, and was later elected mayor of New Britain. Robert C. Vance’s mother, Mathilda O'Connor Vance, became publisher of the Herald in 1904

A New Britain native, Robert C. Vance attended New Britain High School and graduated from Yale College in 1918. He married Arlene-Dorothy Story on July 8, 1928.

=== Military service ===
In 1917, during World War I, he served the French Army as an ambulance driver until the US entered the war, at which time he joined the US Army, returning to the US in 1918. For the remainder of his life, he was “active in national, state, and local veterans’ affairs and, from time to time has been honored for this activity.” ^{,} According to an editorial which ran in the Hartford Courant after his death, “Mr. Vance will be remembered, too, for his interest in veterans' affairs. It began in Paris, when he was one of the group that founded the American Legion.”.

== Work with the Herald ==
Vance was on staff at the Yale Daily News before joining the family business, where his older brother Johnstone Vance (1891-1951) had already assumed the role of managing editor.

Upon Mathilda Vance’s death In 1938, Johnstone Vance assumed the role of Herald publisher and president, holding these positions and that of managing editor until he died in 1951. At that point, Robert inherited all three positions.

Whereas Johnstone Vance was actively political, using the Herald to promote his candidacy in 1924 for U.S. Congress, and making news himself, Robert C. Vance appears to have befriended the leaders of both parties in New Britain (as well as the publishers of other newspapers, who accorded him much more respect than his brother had enjoyed).

When Vance’s son died in 1955, funeral attendees included both U.S. senators from Connecticut, Republicans Prescott Bush and William Purtell; local U.S. Congressman Thomas J. Dodd, a Democrat, and Democratic governor and New Britain native Abraham Ribicoff.^{,}

Speaking at a dinner honoring Robert and his late brother Johnstone in 1953, Ribicoff’s predecessor, Republican John Davis Lodge wished “the Vance Family and to the staff of the Herald my friendly greetings and my good wishes for the continued growth of their fine newspaper and of its influence in the New Britain community.”

== Death ==
Vance, who “had been in poor health for some time”, died on November 4, 1959. Ribicoff characterized his death “a great loss to Connecticut … It is also a personal loss to me, for I had the privilege of his warmth and understanding friendship for many years”.

Agnes Vance Weld, Robert’s sister, succeeded him as publisher of the Herald, which continued to be run by the Vance and Weld families until 1995.

=== Robert C. Vance Foundation ===
Vance's mother was “known for her philanthropies, always carried out in a quiet manner,” and Vance himself appears to have followed her example during his life. In 1956 he founded the Robert C. Vance Charitable Foundation, Inc., which he designated in his will as a major beneficiary of his estate. His estate, valued at about $US 1.3 million in 1960, was the largest probated in New Britain that year.

The foundation has provided grants to a range of charitable causes in central Connecticut, including the local School Readiness Council, the New Britain–Berlin YMCA and the Friendship Shelter Center, a homeless shelter in New Britain.

==== Association with Central Connecticut State University ====
In 1967 the Connecticut Board of Trustees for the State Colleges resolved to name the planned industrial education building at Central Connecticut State College the “Robert C. Vance Industrial Arts Center.” At that time a separate science building was also planned. However, in 1971, the board approved a new plan for a single science and industrial education building to be named for longtime professor Charles E. Pratt (the building was eventually named Copernicus Hall). As part of this change, a newly completed dormitory building was named Robert C. Vance Hall. In 1983 the foundation established the Robert C. Vance Distinguished Lecture Series at Central Connecticut State University, and in 2000 the foundation donated $US 1.4 million to establish the Robert C. Vance Distinguished Professorship of Journalism and Mass Communications at the same institution. At that time a new classroom building at CCSU was named the Robert C. Vance Academic Center in his honor.
