= William H. Webster =

American attorney and jurist (1924–2025)

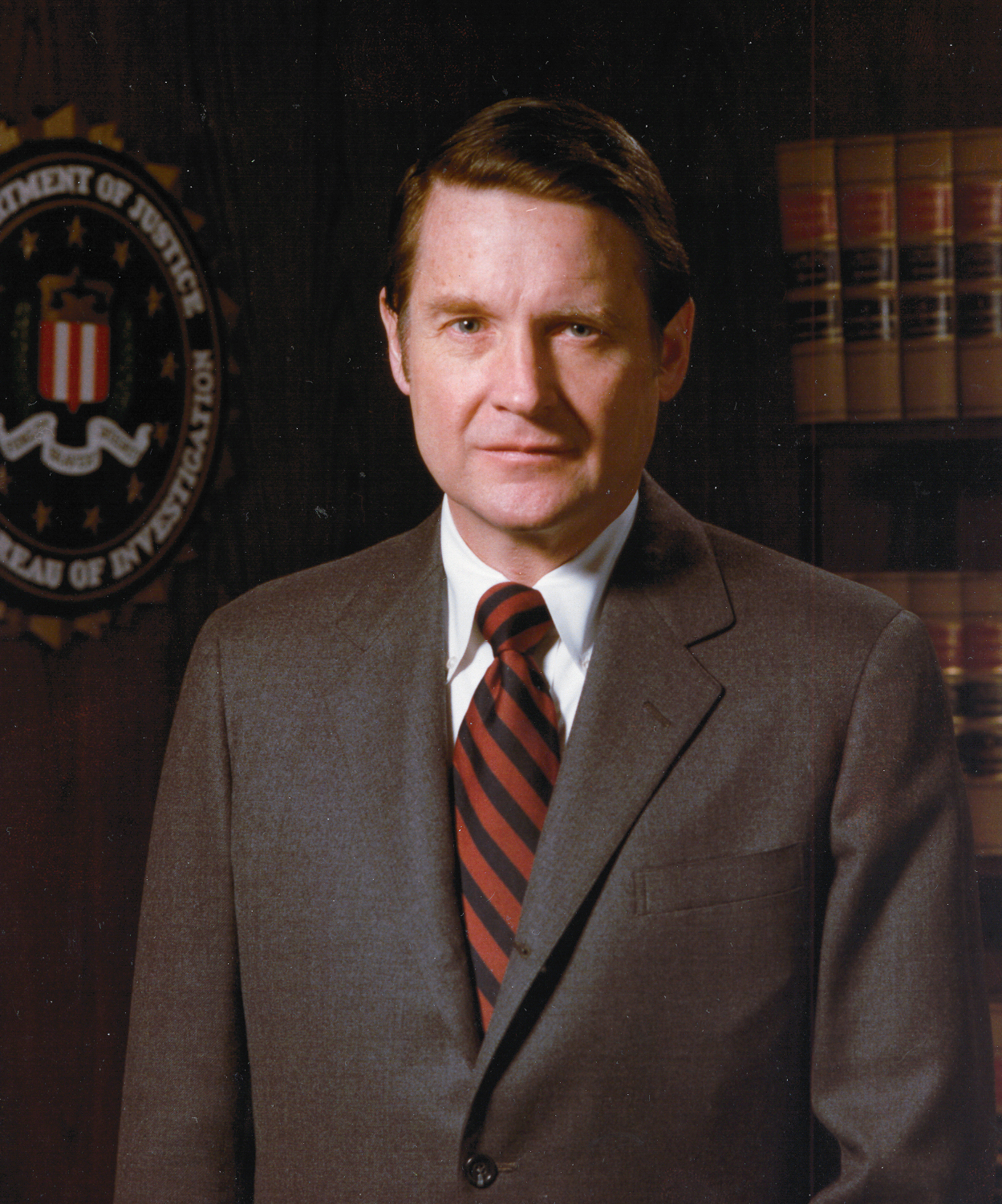
- Webster as FBI director, c. 1978

Chair of the Homeland Security Advisory Council
- In office August 10, 2005 – August 18, 2020
- President: George W. Bush; Barack Obama; Donald Trump
- Deputy: James R. Schlesinger; Gary Hart; William Bratton
- Preceded by: Joseph J. Grano Jr.
- Succeeded by: William Bratton

14th Director of Central Intelligence
- In office May 26, 1987 – August 31, 1991
- President: Ronald Reagan; George H. W. Bush
- Deputy: Robert Gates; Richard James Kerr
- Preceded by: Robert Gates (acting)
- Succeeded by: Robert Gates

3rd Director of the Federal Bureau of Investigation
- In office February 23, 1978 – May 25, 1987
- President: Jimmy Carter; Ronald Reagan
- Deputy: James B. Adams
- Preceded by: James B. Adams (acting)
- Succeeded by: John E. Otto (acting)

Judge of the United States Court of Appeals for the Eighth Circuit
- In office July 18, 1973 – February 22, 1978
- Appointed by: Richard Nixon
- Preceded by: Marion Charles Matthes
- Succeeded by: Theodore McMillian

Judge of the United States District Court for the Eastern District of Missouri
- In office December 21, 1970 – July 18, 1973
- Appointed by: Richard Nixon
- Preceded by: Seat established
- Succeeded by: John Francis Nangle

United States Attorney for the Eastern District of Missouri
- In office January 1, 1960 – January 20, 1961
- President: Dwight D. Eisenhower
- Preceded by: Harry Richards
- Succeeded by: Jeff Lance

Personal details
- Born: William Hedgcock Webster; March 6, 1924 St. Louis, Missouri, U.S.
- Died: August 8, 2025 (aged 101) Warrenton, Virginia, U.S.
- Party: Republican
- Spouses: Drusilla Lane (m. 1950; died 1984); Lynda Clugston (m. 1990)
- Children: 3
- Education: Amherst College (BA); Washington University (JD)

Military service
- Branch: United States Navy
- Service years: 1943–1946; 1950–1952
- Rank: Lieutenant
- Conflicts: World War II; Korean War

William Hedgcock Webster (March 6, 1924 – August 8, 2025) was an American attorney and jurist who served as chair of the Homeland Security Advisory Council from 2005 until 2020. He was a United States district judge of the United States District Court for the Eastern District of Missouri and a United States circuit judge of the United States Court of Appeals for the Eighth Circuit before serving as director of the Federal Bureau of Investigation (FBI) from 1978 to 1987 and director of Central Intelligence (CIA) from 1987 to 1991. He is the only person to have held both positions.

== Life and career ==
=== Early life, education and early career ===
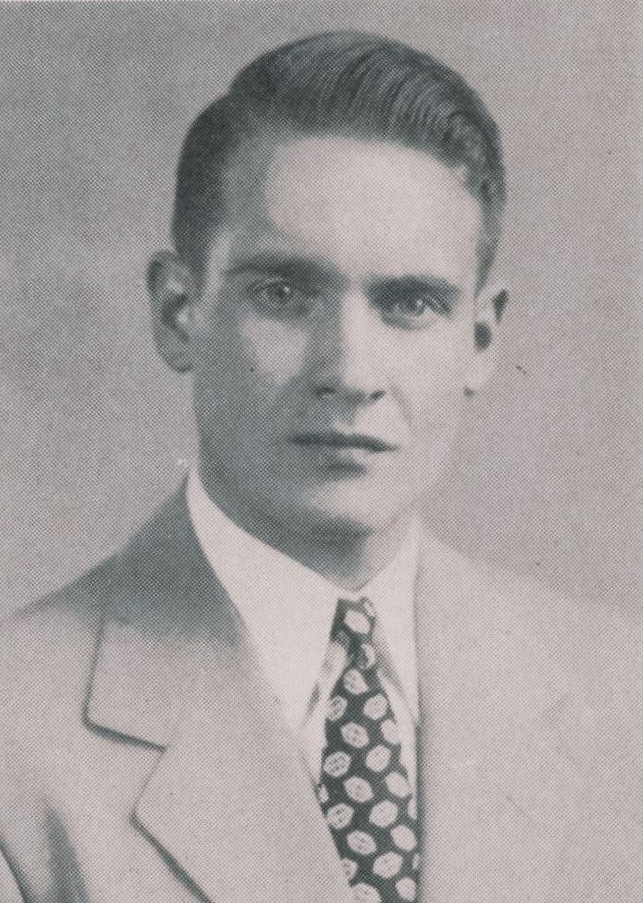
Webster in the Amherst College yearbook, 1947

Webster was born on March 6, 1924, in St. Louis, Missouri, He was the son of Thomas Milliken Webster and Katherine Hedgcock, and received his early education in Webster Groves, Missouri; and served as a lieutenant in the United States Navy during World War II. Following his service in the Navy, he received his Bachelor of Arts degree from Amherst College in Amherst, Massachusetts, in 1947. While at Amherst, he was a member of the Psi Upsilon fraternity. He received his Juris Doctor from the Washington University School of Law in 1949. After law school, he served in the Navy again during the Korean War; later, he joined the St. Louis law firm Armstrong Teasdale, but left private practice soon after to begin a career in public service. He was the United States Attorney for the Eastern District of Missouri from 1960 to 1961, then a member of the Missouri Board of Law Examiners from 1964 to 1969.

=== Federal judicial service ===
Webster was nominated by President Richard Nixon on December 8, 1970, to the United States District Court for the Eastern District of Missouri, to a new seat created by 84 Stat. 294. He was confirmed by the United States Senate on December 17, 1970, and received his commission on December 21, 1970. His service was terminated on August 10, 1973, due to elevation to the Eighth Circuit.

Webster was nominated by President Nixon on June 13, 1973, to a seat on the United States Court of Appeals for the Eighth Circuit vacated by Judge Marion Charles Matthes. He was confirmed by the Senate on July 13, 1973, and received his commission on July 18, 1973. When William O. Douglas retired from the Supreme Court in 1975, Webster was on Edward H. Levi's final list from which Gerald Ford would nominate his successor. Levi said of Webster that he

has proven to be a very competent judge – energetic, careful, and intelligent.

Nonetheless, when Ford made his choice Webster was rated below eventual nominee John Paul Stevens, and also Arlin Adams and Philip Willis Tone.

Webster resigned from his judgeship on February 22, 1978.

=== Director of the Federal Bureau of Investigation (1978–1987) ===
In 1978, President Jimmy Carter appointed him as director of the Federal Bureau of Investigation. This was despite Webster being a registered Republican. Webster assumed the position of director on February 23, 1978.

Webster was portrayed by actor Sean Cullen in the second season of the Netflix show Mindhunter, which was set during his tenure as director of the FBI.

=== Director of Central Intelligence (1987–1991) ===
In 1987, President Ronald Reagan appointed him director of the Central Intelligence Agency. He led the CIA from May 26, 1987 until his retirement from the post on August 31, 1991 (four years, 97 days, the 5th-longest term of 19 directors). After this, Webster practiced law at Milbank, where he specialized in arbitration, mediation and internal investigation.

=== Public Company Accounting Oversight Board (2002) ===
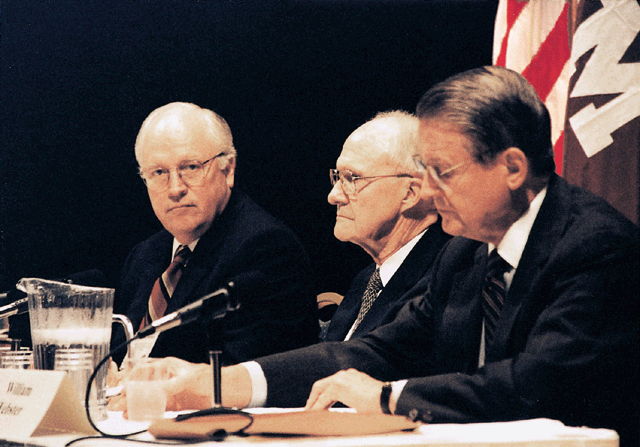
Webster (right) with Dick Cheney (left) and Brent Scowcroft (center) in 2000

In 2002, he became the first chairman of the Public Company Accounting Oversight Board (PCAOB). However, his appointment was controversial, and another controversy erupted when newspapers reported that Webster had headed the board audit committee of U.S. Technologies, a high-tech company being investigated for accounting irregularities and accused of fraud. Webster resigned less than three weeks after the PCAOB was set up.

=== Later life (2005–2025) ===
Webster was the chairman of the Homeland Security Advisory Council, from 2005 to 2020.

In the 2020 presidential election, Webster, along with over 130 other former Republican national security officials, signed a statement that asserted that President Trump was unfit to serve another term, and "To that end, we are firmly convinced that it is in the best interest of our nation that Vice President Joe Biden be elected as the next President of the United States, and we will vote for him." Similarly, he endorsed Kamala Harris in 2024.

== Honors and awards ==
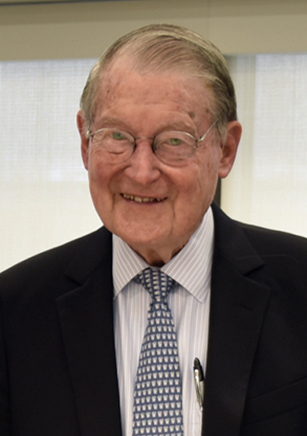
Webster in 2016

Webster received numerous honors and awards for his service. Washington University granted him the Alumni Citation for contributions to the field of law in 1972 and in 1981 he received the William Greenleaf Eliot Society Award for his support for the university. In 1984, he received the U.S. Senator John Heinz Award for Greatest Public Service by an Elected or Appointed Official, an award given out annually by Jefferson Awards. In 1999, Washington University's School of Law created the Webster Society, an outstanding scholars program. Furthermore, he received the Distinguished Alumnus Award from the university's law school in 1977. The St. Louis Globe-Democrat named him "Man of the Year". In 1978, he received the Golden Plate Award of the American Academy of Achievement.

Webster also received honorary degrees from several colleges and universities. In 1991, he was presented the Distinguished Intelligence Medal, the Presidential Medal of Freedom, and the National Security Medal. In June 2008, Webster received an honorary Doctor of Laws degree as well as honorary doctorates from the Institute of World Politics and National Intelligence University. He received the William J. Donovan Award from the OSS Society in 2005 and served as an honorary chairman of this organization.

Webster was a member of the American Bar Association, the Council of the American Law Institute, the Order of the Coif, The Missouri Bar, the Bar Association of Metropolitan St. Louis, and the Psi Upsilon fraternity. Additionally, he served as chairman of the Corporation, Banking and Business Law section of the American Bar Association. He was a fellow of the American Bar Foundation and an honorary fellow of the American College of Trial Lawyers. He served as co-chairman of the Homeland Security Advisory Council. In 2009, he was named to head an independent investigation of the FBI's actions surrounding the Fort Hood shooting.

Webster also served as an honorary director on the board of directors at the Atlantic Council.

== Personal life and death ==
Webster was married to Drusilla Lane for 34 years until her death in 1984. The couple had three children.

In 1990, Webster married Lynda Clugston. In 2015, the couple were targeted by a man who peddled a lottery scam over phone calls and emails. Over multiple phone calls, Keniel Aeon Thomas of Jamaica told Webster and Clugston that he would "set their house ablaze or have a sniper shoot them in the back of the head" if they did not "pay him thousands of dollars", according to prosecutors' filings. The perpetrator was sent to prison for nearly six years in early 2019.

Webster turned 100 on March 6, 2024. He died at a care facility in Warrenton, Virginia, on August 8, 2025, at the age of 101.

Legal offices
New seat	Judge of the United States District Court for the Eastern District of Missouri; 1970–1973	Succeeded by John Francis Nangle
Preceded by Marion Charles Matthes	Judge of the United States Court of Appeals for the Eighth Circuit; 1973–1978	Succeeded by Theodore McMillian
Government offices
Preceded by James B. Adams; Acting	Director of the Federal Bureau of Investigation; 1978–1987	Succeeded by John E. Otto; Acting
Preceded by Robert Gates; Acting	Director of Central Intelligence; 1987–1991	Succeeded by Robert Gates
Preceded by Joseph J. Grano Jr.	Chair of the Homeland Security Advisory Council; 2005–2020	Succeeded by William Bratton
