= Dave Campo =

American football player and coach (born 1947)

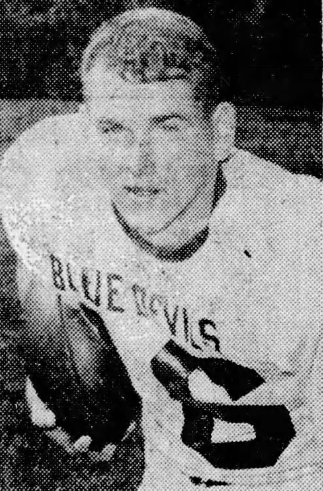
- Campo c. 1969

Biographical details
- Born: July 18, 1947 (age 79); Groton, Connecticut, U.S.

Playing career

Football
- 1966–1968: Central Connecticut

Baseball
- 1967–1970: Central Connecticut
- Positions: Halfback (football); Second baseman (baseball)

Coaching career (HC unless noted)

Football
- 1970: New London HS (CT) (assistant freshmen)
- 1971–1972: Central Connecticut (LB)
- 1973: Albany (DB)
- 1974: Bridgeport (DC)
- 1975: Pittsburgh (GA)
- 1976: Washington State (DB)
- 1977–1979: Boise State (DB)
- 1980: Oregon State (DB)
- 1981–1982: Weber State (DC)
- 1983: Iowa State (DB)
- 1984–1986: Syracuse (DB)
- 1987–1988: Miami (FL) (DB)
- 1989–1990: Dallas Cowboys (def. assistant)
- 1991–1994: Dallas Cowboys (DB)
- 1995–1999: Dallas Cowboys (DC)
- 2000–2002: Dallas Cowboys
- 2003–2004: Cleveland Browns (DC)
- 2005–2007: Jacksonville Jaguars (AHC/DB)
- 2008–2011: Dallas Cowboys (DB)
- 2012–2015: Kansas (AHC/DC/DB)
- 2018–2019: USC (consultant)

Head coaching record
- Overall: 15–33

David Cross Campo (born July 18, 1947) is an American football coach and former player. Campo served as the head coach for the Dallas Cowboys of the National Football League (NFL) from 2000 to 2002, compiling a record of 15 wins and 33 losses. He has also been an assistant coach for numerous NFL and college teams.

== Early years and college career ==
Campo attended Robert E. Fitch High School in Groton, Connecticut, where he lettered in football and baseball. He attended Bridgton Academy in 1966.

Campo attended Central Connecticut State, where he lettered in football and baseball. In football, he played halfback. In baseball, he played second base and was a two-time All-East selection.

In 1999, Campo was awarded an honorary doctoral degree from his alma mater. Of more than 50 such degrees awarded by CCSU, Campo's remains the only one titled Doctor of Health and Physical Education.

== Coaching career ==
Campo began his coaching career in 1970 as an assistant freshmen coach for New London High School. In 1971 he returned to his alma mater, Central Connecticut, to coach the linebackers. After two seasons he took over as the defensive backs coach for Albany. After one season, he was hired under head coach Ray Murphy to be the defensive coordinator at Bridgeport at just 26-years-old. Bridgeport's football team disbanded before the 1975 season and Campo joined Pittsburgh's staff as a graduate assistant.

In 1976, Campo was hired as the defensive backs coach for Washington State. He accepted the same position with Boise State in 1977. In 1980, he was hired as the defensive backs coach for Oregon State. In 1981, he was hired as the defensive coordinator for Weber State as the first assistant named under first-year head coach Mike Price. Campo spent 1983 and 1984 to 1986 as the defensive backs coach for Iowa State and Syracuse, respectively.

In 1987, Campo joined the University of Miami staff under head coach Jimmy Johnson as secondary coach. At Miami, he helped the Hurricanes to a two-year record of 23–1 and the 1987 National Championship. Safety Bennie Blades was the 1987 Thorpe Award winner before being selected with the third pick in the NFL draft by the Detroit Lions.

=== Dallas Cowboys ===
After two seasons with the Hurricanes, Campo followed Johnson to the Dallas Cowboys in 1989 as a defensive assistant coach. After Dick Nolan (a Landry holdover) left following the 1990 season, Campo became the defensive backs coach and was a part of two Super Bowl championships (the 1992 and 1993 seasons). When Butch Davis left the Cowboys to become the Miami Hurricanes' head coach after the 1994 season, Campo was promoted to defensive coordinator. In his first season as defensive coordinator, the Cowboys won the Super Bowl. After five seasons as defensive coordinator, Campo was named as the fifth head coach of the Cowboys on January 26, 2000.

After the firing of Chan Gailey in 2000, he was promoted to the head coaching duties of the Dallas Cowboys, over candidates Joe Avezzano and Hudson Houck.

Campo's head coaching debut (known as the "Pickle Juice Game") was marred by a successfully executed, surprise on-side kick on the opening kickoff by the underdog Philadelphia Eagles in the season opener. Later in the game, the Cowboys lost Joey Galloway, their prize off-season free agent acquisition, for the season and quarterback Troy Aikman for several games with a concussion (Aikman would retire upon the conclusion of the season). The Cowboys lost to the Eagles 41–14 and ultimately finished the season at 5–11.

With considerably lower expectations for the 2001 season after Aikman's retirement, the Cowboys again finished 5–11, but Campo was given credit by many for getting the most out of a less talented team. However, Campo was harshly criticized after a Thanksgiving Day game against the Denver Broncos when, trailing 26–10 early in the fourth quarter, Dallas scored a touchdown to make the score 26–16. Campo at first decided to go for two which would narrow the lead to 8 points (a one possession game) but after a timeout, decided to kick the extra point leaving Dallas down by 9 points and needing two possessions rather than one. Dallas was only able to score one more touchdown and lost 26–24.

In 2002, Dallas was believed to have much better talent, having acquired all pro defensive lineman La'Roi Glover and drafting talents such as safety Roy Williams and receiver Antonio Bryant, and a now-more experienced starting quarterback in Quincy Carter. The team was featured on HBO's Hard Knocks in the preseason and Campo's leadership on that show was widely praised. However, the Cowboys stumbled in the season opener, losing to the expansion Houston Texans in the Texans' very first game. Dallas entered Week 14 with a 5–7 record and led the San Francisco 49ers 27–24 with about 2 minutes to play. Facing a fourth and one at the 28-yard line, Campo opted for a field goal attempt even though there was a considerable amount of time left in the game. The attempt failed and taking over at the 37, the 49ers drove down the field to win the game. Campo's team was blown out the next two games and finished the season 5–11 for the third straight season, after which he was fired. To date, he is the only Cowboys head coach to have left the team with a losing record. Indeed, he is the only coach in franchise history to have never posted a winning season or coached a playoff game.

=== NFL coaching ===
In 2003, after his dismissal from the Cowboys, Campo was hired as the defensive coordinator by the Cleveland Browns to replace Foge Fazio, while working under head coach Butch Davis, Campo's predecessor as Cowboys defensive coordinator. After Davis resigned from the Browns, his successor Romeo Crennel, fired Campo. Campo then joined the Jacksonville Jaguars as assistant head coach working primarily with the secondary unit, under head coach Jack Del Rio.

=== Return to Dallas ===
In January 2008, Campo was re-hired by the Cowboys as their secondary coach to replace Todd Bowles, while working under head coach Wade Phillips. He was not re-signed after the 2011 season and was replaced with Jerome Henderson.

=== University of Kansas ===
On January 13, 2012, Kansas head coach Charlie Weis hired Campo as defensive coordinator and defensive backs coach. He stayed on after Weis was fired early in the 2014 season and replaced first with interim coach Clint Bowen and permanent head coach David Beaty. He left after the 2015 season.

=== USC ===
In August 2018 it was confirmed that Campo had been hired as a consultant at the University of Southern California (USC) to work closely with defensive coordinator Clancy Pendergast. Campo had been away from the game for the last two seasons, the first period since 1972 that he had not held a coaching job at the college or professional level.

== Head coaching record ==
Team	Year	Regular season					Postseason			
Team	Year	Won	Lost	Ties	Win %	Finish	Won	Lost	Win %	Result
DAL	2000	5	11	0	.313	4th in NFC East	–	–	–	–
DAL	2001	5	11	0	.313	5th in NFC East	–	–	–	–
DAL	2002	5	11	0	.313	4th in NFC East	–	–	–	–
Total		15	33	0	.313					
