= Zulma R. Toro =

American academic administrator

13th President of Central Connecticut State University
- In office January 2017 – September 2026
- Preceded by: Jack Miller
- Succeeded by: Kimberly Kostelis (interim)

9th Chancellor of the University of Puerto Rico at Mayagüez
- In office 1999–2001
- Preceded by: Fred V. Soltero Harrington (interim); Antonio Santos Cabrera
- Succeeded by: Pablo Rodríguez (interim); Jorge Iván Vélez Arocho

Personal details
- Born: Puerto Rico
- Education: University of Puerto Rico (BS); University of Michigan (MS); Georgia Tech (PhD)
- Scientific career
- Fields: engineering
- Workplaces: University of Arkansas at Little Rock; Wichita State University; University of New Haven; University of Puerto Rico at Mayagüez; Central Connecticut State University
- Thesis: Network of queues and decomposition methods for modeling manufacturing systems (1988)

Zulma R. Toro is an American engineer and academic administrator who served as the president of Central Connecticut State University from January 2017 to September 2026.

== Early life and education ==
Toro was born and raised in Puerto Rico.

She earned a Bachelor of Science degree in industrial engineering from the University of Puerto Rico, followed by a Master of Science in industrial and operations engineering from the University of Michigan. Toro then earned a Ph.D. in industrial and systems engineering from Georgia Tech.

== Career ==
Prior to joining CCSU, Toro served as the executive vice chancellor and provost of the University of Arkansas at Little Rock, Dean of the Wichita State University College of Engineering, Dean of the Tagliatela College of Engineering at the University of New Haven, and chancellor of the University of Puerto Rico at Mayagüez where she was removed after 20 months in that position by the president of the university after a strike that lasted two weeks. During the strike, which was started by the faculty and students, the school was closed.

=== CCSU ===
Toro became the 13th President of Central Connecticut State University in January 2017, the first female and Latino to serve in the role. Toro succeeded John "Jack" W. Miller, who retired on September 19, 2016.

Toro's time at CCSU has been marred by numerous controversies. She has been accused of abusing her power and public shaming.
