= Eliza Talcott =

American missionary

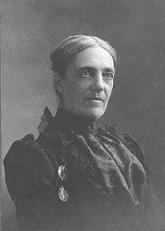
- Born: May 22, 1836; Vernon, Connecticut, United States
- Died: January 11, 1911 (aged 74); Kobe, Japanese Empire
- Occupations: Missionary, educator, nurse
- Known for: Missionary and educational work in Japan

Eliza Talcott (born 1836, died 1911), also known by her Japanese name Eliza Tarukatto, was an American missionary. Talcott was notable for her missionary work in Japan, and is credited as one of the founders of Kobe College.

== Biography ==
Talcott was born in Vernon, Connecticut on 22 May 1836, part of the prominent Talcott family. Her mother and father died when she was young, and so she was educated at the Sarah Porter School in Farmington, Connecticut. She would eventually attend State Normal School (now Central Connecticut State University) in New Britain, eventually returning to Farmington to teach at the Sarah Porter School. She identified as a member of the Congregational church.

In 1873, Talcott volunteered her services to the American Board of Commissioners for Foreign Missions as a missionary to the Kobe foreign settlement in Kobe, Japan (which had recently undergone the Meiji Restoration), arriving in March with two other single women; Talcott was thirty-seven at the time, and thus considered relatively old by missionary standards. Once in Japan, Talcott and her fellow missionaries devoted their time to instructing classes of Japanese women, spreading Christian teachings, and learning the Japanese language. Sources have described Talcott as having an aptitude for languages, noting that she learned Japanese quickly. In addition to her teaching, Talcott travelled throughout Japan, which she considered to be a beautiful country. However, some Japanese cultural values (such as divorce laws and views on prostitution) clashed with her Christian views. Most of her work took place in and around Kobe, though in her later years in the country she actively travelled to proselytize. She also wrote several articles for missionary newsletters.

As part of her activities in Japan, Talcott helped to establish Kobe Girls' School in 1874. Classes held at the school taught English, sewing, and singing, along with biblical study. The girls' school would eventually become Kobe College in 1894, which considers Talcott to be one of its founders.

In addition to her teaching, Talcott used her nursing skills to provide aid to wounded soldiers during the First Sino-Japanese War, working in Hiroshima. In 1895, she became the head of Doshisha University's nursing school. Talcott died of pneumonia in Kobe in 1911.
