= Gilbert L. Gigliotti =

Gilbert L. Gigliotti (born 7 November 1961) is a professor of early American literature in the English Department at Central Connecticut State University in New Britain, Connecticut, where he has taught since 1992. He earned a Ph.D. in Comparative Literature (Latin, Greek, and English) at The Catholic University of America (1992).

Gigliotti's dissertation, entitled "Musae Americanae: The Neo-Latin Poetry of Colonial and Revolutionary America," remains the only book-length examination of neo-Latin poetic practice in Anglo-American culture. He has written articles and reviews on a variety of early American Neo-Latin subjects, including farmer/poet John Beveridge and early American Puritan elegies.

At CCSU, Gigliotti teaches a variety of early American authors, including The Connecticut Wits, Anne Bradstreet, Edward Taylor, Cotton Mather, and Nathaniel Hawthorne. He produces Central Authors, the university's television series featuring faculty, staff, and alumni/ae speaking about their publications.

Gigliotti has authored two books on Frank Sinatra, hosts a weekly radio program on WFCS, curated exhibits of Sinatra memorabilia at several libraries throughout central Connecticut, and speaks about the singer/actor/entertainer to civic, service, and social clubs. He has taught a course on Sinatra in literature, as well. His work is part of a sustained academic interest in the cultural importance of Sinatra that has been well documented in many media outlets, including The New York Times and The Chronicle of Higher Education.

Other publications examine Girolamo Fracastoro's 16th-century neo-Latin poem Syphilis, American poet Philip Freneau, and chess in early America.

== Books ==
- Ava Gardner: Touches of Venus Entasis Press, 2010
- Foreword to David Lloyd's The Gospel According to Frank New American Press, 2009
- Sinatra: But Buddy I'm a Kind of Poem Entasis Press, 2008
- A Storied Singer: Frank Sinatra as Literary Conceit Greenwood Press, 2002
