= Joseph J. Grano Jr. =

American businessman

Joe Grano
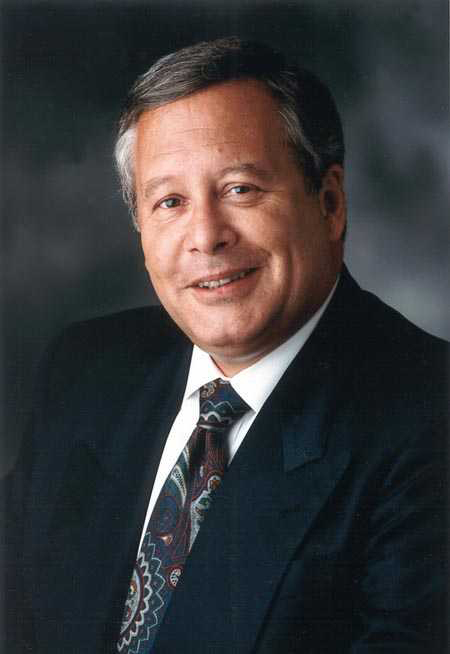

Chair of the Homeland Security Advisory Council
- In office March 19, 2002 – August 10, 2005
- President: George W. Bush
- Preceded by: Position established
- Succeeded by: William H. Webster

Personal details
- Born: March 7, 1948 (age 77) Hartford, Connecticut, U.S.
- Party: Republican
- Education: Central Connecticut State University

Joseph J. Grano Jr. is an American businessperson.

== Business ==
Joseph Grano is currently chairman and CEO of Centurion Holdings LLC, a company that advises private and public companies. From 2001-2004, he was chairman of UBS Financial Services Inc. (formerly UBS PaineWebber).

Grano joined PaineWebber in February 1988 as President of Retail Sales and Marketing, and became President of PaineWebber Group in December 1994. As president, he oversaw a series of important and dramatic restructurings at the firm, including the acquisition of Kidder, Peabody in 1995 and J.C. Bradford in 2000. Finally, Grano was instrumental in helping to bring about the merger of PaineWebber with UBS in 2000, when he was named President & CEO of UBS PaineWebber and the following year was named Chairman & CEO.

Prior to joining PaineWebber, Grano was with Merrill Lynch for 16 years, holding various senior management positions including Director of National Sales. In 1987, he was named the industry’s best retail marketing executive in a survey conducted by Investment Dealers’ Digest. Grano was chairman of the board of governors of the NASD and a member of the NASD’s Executive Committee.

== Military service ==
Before joining Merrill Lynch, Grano served in the U.S. Special Forces (Green Berets). He became one of the Army’s youngest officers, achieving the rank of captain.

== Homeland Security Advisory Council ==
In 2002, Grano was appointed by President George W. Bush to serve as the Chairman of the Homeland Security Advisory Council. He relinquished his position in August 2005.

== Honorary Degrees ==
Grano holds Honorary Doctor of Laws degrees from Pepperdine University and Babson College as well as Honorary Doctor of Humane Letters degrees from Queens College, City University of New York and Central Connecticut State University. He also holds an Honorary Doctor of Business Administration degree from the University of New Haven. On May 19, 2007, Grano gave the commencement address at Central Connecticut State University.

== Philanthropic & Community Service ==
Grano served as Vice Chairman of the Queens College Foundation Board of Trustees, and was on the board of directors of the YMCA of Greater New York and on the Board of Lenox Hill Hospital. He is a member of the Council for the United States and Italy, a member of the City University of New York’s Business Leadership Council and a former member of the National Board of D.A.R.E. Currently serving on the Board of Directors of L.E.A.D., Law Enforcement Against Drugs and Violence.

== Awards ==
In October 2002, Grano received the Corporate Leadership Award from the Thurgood Marshall Scholarship Fund for his commitment to education. In 2000, he became the 39th recipient of the USO Gold Medal Award for Distinguished Service, and was named Business Leader of the Year by Georgetown University’s School of Business. In 1998 he received the “La Bellissima America” award for his leadership role in preserving the heritage of Italian-Americans, and in 1996, he was a recipient of the Ellis Island Medal of Honor in recognition of distinguished contributions to the United States.

Government offices
New office	Chair of the Homeland Security Advisory Council; 2002–2005	Succeeded by William H. Webster
