= Fay Vincent =

American baseball commissioner (1938–2025)

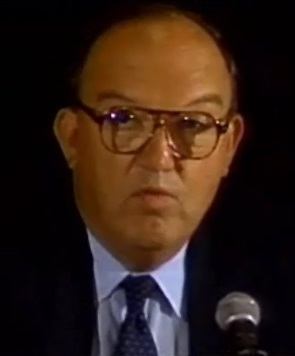
- A still of Vincent from a film by MLB and the New York Yankees

8th Commissioner of Baseball
- In office September 13, 1989 – September 7, 1992
- Preceded by: Bart Giamatti
- Succeeded by: Bud Selig

Personal details
- Born: Francis Thomas Vincent Jr. May 29, 1938 Waterbury, Connecticut, U.S.
- Died: February 1, 2025 (aged 86) Vero Beach, Florida, U.S.
- Education: Williams College (BA); Yale University (JD)
- Known for: President of the New England Collegiate Baseball League (1998–2003); MLB Commissioner

Francis Thomas "Fay" Vincent Jr. (May 29, 1938 – February 1, 2025) was an American entertainment lawyer, securities regulator, and sports executive who served as the eighth commissioner of baseball from September 13, 1989, to September 7, 1992.

== Early life and education ==
Vincent was born on May 29, 1938, in Waterbury, Connecticut, the son of Alice (née Lynch), a teacher, and Francis Thomas Vincent, a telephone company employee and sports official. He was a graduate of the Hotchkiss School.

He attended Williams College, where a near-fatal accident left him with a crushed spine and paralyzed legs. He had been locked inside his dorm room as a prank; while climbing onto the roof to escape he slipped off a four-story ledge. Surgery and three months in traction followed. Doctors said that he would never walk again and his leg never fully recovered, however he was able to walk relying on a cane for the rest of his life.

He received a B.A. degree from Williams (class of 1960) with honors and a J.D. degree from Yale Law School (class of 1963). He went on to become a partner in the Washington, D.C., law firm of Caplin & Drysdale. He also served as Associate Director of the Division of Corporation Finance of the U.S. Securities and Exchange Commission (SEC). Beginning in 1978 he became the chairman of Columbia Pictures, and senior vice president of Coca-Cola when it purchased Columbia in March 1982. In April 1986 he was promoted to Executive Vice President. During his nine years as chief executive officer with Columbia, the film studio produced financially successful movies such as Kramer vs. Kramer and Tootsie and box-office bombs like Ishtar.

== Commissioner of Baseball ==
At the behest of his longtime friend, incoming Commissioner of Baseball Bart Giamatti, Vincent accepted the position of deputy commissioner. As deputy commissioner, Vincent played a major role in negotiating a settlement to the betting scandal involving Cincinnati Reds manager Pete Rose. As part of the settlement, Rose agreed to withdraw from the sport for an indefinite period of time to avoid further punishment.

Vincent became acting commissioner when Giamatti died suddenly on September 1, 1989. After consulting with Giamatti's widow, Toni, he agreed to succeed Giamatti as commissioner and was duly elected by MLB owners as the eighth commissioner of baseball on September 13. In his first year as commissioner, he presided over the 1989 World Series, which was interrupted by the Loma Prieta earthquake; the owners' lockout during Spring Training of the 1990 season; and the expulsion of New York Yankees owner George Steinbrenner from the game.

In 1990, National League president Bill White was prepared to suspend umpire Joe West for slamming Philadelphia pitcher Dennis Cook to the field, but Vincent intervened and no discipline was imposed. On September 4, 1991, the Committee for Statistical Accuracy, appointed by Vincent, changed the definition of a no-hitter to require that a pitcher or pitching staff hold a team hitless for at least nine full innings and a complete game. Since New York Yankee Andy Hawkins (who never gave up a hit during a game against the Chicago White Sox on July 1, 1990, despite the White Sox winning the game 4–0) played for the visiting team, the White Sox never batted in the ninth inning and Hawkins lost the credit for a no-hitter.

This same committee also ruled that Roger Maris was (then) the one and only single-season home run record holder, overturning the 1961 decision of former commissioner Ford Frick that Maris and Ruth's home run totals should be listed side-by-side for 154- and 162-game seasons. (Contrary to popular belief, Frick never mentioned using an asterisk). Also during his commissionership, Vincent made it known (e.g. while being interviewed by Pat O'Brien during CBS' coverage of Game 4 of the 1991 World Series) that if he had the chance, he would get rid of the designated hitter rule. During and after his tenure, Vincent defended the indefinite suspension of Rose and his role in its imposition. When Rose applied for re-instatement, which he was permitted to do under the terms of the settlement, Vincent never acted on the request.

In the 2004 made-for-television movie about the Rose scandal, Hustle, Vincent was portrayed by actor Alan Jordan.

=== 1989 World Series ===
On October 17, 1989, Vincent sat in a field box behind the left dugout at San Francisco's Candlestick Park. At 5:04 p.m., just prior to Game 3 of the World Series between the San Francisco Giants and Oakland Athletics, the 6.9 Mw Loma Prieta earthquake hit with a maximum Mercalli intensity of IX (Violent). At approximately 5:35 p.m., after coming to the conclusion that the power couldn't be restored before sunset, Vincent ordered the game to be postponed. According to Vincent, he had already made the decision to postpone Game 3 without telling anybody first. As a result, the umpires filed a formal protest of Vincent's decision. However, the game had to be postponed due to trouble with gas lines as well as the power issue.

The World Series ultimately resumed after a 10-day postponement (and some initial conflict between Vincent and San Francisco mayor Art Agnos, who felt that the World Series ought to have been delayed much longer) on October 27, 1989. While presenting the World Series Trophy to the Athletics, who wound up winning the World Series in a four-game sweep, Vincent summed up the 1989 World Series as a "remarkable World Series in many respects."

=== 1990 lockout ===
In February 1990, owners announced that spring training would not be starting as scheduled. This occurred after MLBPA Executive Director Donald Fehr became afraid that the owners would institute a salary cap. Fehr believed that a salary cap could possibly restrict the number of choices free agents could make and a pay-for-performance scale would eliminate multiyear contracts. The lockout, which was the seventh work stoppage in baseball since 1972, lasted 32 games and wiped out almost all of spring training.

Vincent worked with both the owners and MLBPA, and on March 19, 1990, Vincent was able to announce a new Basic Agreement (which raised the minimum major league salary from $68,000 to $100,000 and established a six-man study committee on revenue sharing). As a consequence for the lockout, Opening Day for the 1990 season was moved back a week to April 9, and the season was extended by three days to accommodate the normal 162-game schedule.

=== George Steinbrenner ===
On July 30, 1990, Vincent banned New York Yankees owner George Steinbrenner from baseball for life after Steinbrenner paid Howard Spira, a small-time gambler, $40,000 for "dirt" on his outfielder Dave Winfield after Winfield sued Steinbrenner for failing to pay his foundation the $300,000 guaranteed in his contract. Steinbrenner was eventually reinstated in 1992 for a return in the spring of 1993.

It came out later from Vincent that he had wanted to suspend Steinbrenner for only two years. It was Steinbrenner who asked for a lifetime ban as he was tired of baseball and wanted to help run the US Olympic effort (at the time, he was vice president of the US Olympic Committee) while his family could run the team around his absence. Steinbrenner knew he could not run the Olympic effort if he was suspended, so he asked for a lifetime ban, which he received after 11 hours of negotiation. Steinbrenner then applied for (and received) reinstatement after two years.

=== Steve Howe ===
On June 24, 1992, Vincent permanently suspended pitcher Steve Howe for repeated drug offenses. Vincent was incensed when upper Yankee management (Buck Showalter, Gene Michael, and Jack Lawn) agreed to testify on Howe's behalf, and threatened them with expulsion from the game:

You have effectively resigned from baseball by agreeing to appear at that hearing.... you should have left your conscience and your principles outside the door.

The three men testified for Howe as promised, and remained active in baseball. Three months later, Vincent was removed from his job as commissioner. An arbitrator overturned Vincent's suspension of Howe on November 11, 1992.

=== Collusion ===
Fay Vincent on the effects of collusion:

"The Union basically doesn’t trust the Ownership because collusion was a $280 million theft by Selig and Reinsdorf of that money from the players. I mean, they rigged the signing of free agents. They got caught. They paid $280 million to the players. And I think that’s polluted labor relations in baseball ever since it happened. I think it’s the reason Fehr has no trust in Selig."

=== 1993 expansion ===
In June 1991, Vincent declared that the American League would receive $42 million of the National League's $190 million in expansion revenue and that the AL would provide players in the National League expansion draft (involving the Colorado Rockies and Florida Marlins).

In an attempt to win support in the American League and balance the vote, Vincent decreed that the AL owners were entitled to 22 percent of the $190 million take. This decision marked the first time in expansion history that leagues were required to share expansion revenue or provide players for another league's expansion draft. He said the owners expanded to raise money to pay their collusion debt.

=== Realignment ===
Just prior to leaving office, Vincent had plans to realign the National League. Vincent wanted the Chicago Cubs and St. Louis Cardinals to switch divisions with the Cincinnati Reds and Atlanta Braves. When Major League Baseball realigned in 1969, this geographical anomaly was created in order to give the Chicago and St. Louis franchises more games during television's prime time schedule. National League president Bill White warned Vincent that realigning without league approval would be in violation of the National League Constitution.

Many thought that plan would be beneficial to the league as a whole, especially by building a regional rivalry between the new franchise in Miami and the Atlanta Braves. The Cubs, however, opposed the move, suggesting that fans in the Central Time Zone would be forced to watch more games originating on the West Coast with later broadcast times (had the realignment included the use of a balanced schedule, the Cubs would have actually played more games against teams outside their division). On July 17, 1992, the Chicago Cubs sued Vincent and asked the U.S. District Court in Chicago for a preliminary injunction to prevent implementation, which was granted two weeks later. After Vincent's attorneys appealed, oral arguments were scheduled for August 30 of that year. Ultimately, Vincent resigned before the litigation was scheduled to resume, so as a result, the Cubs dropped their suit.

Although Vincent's vision never really came into fruition, Major League Baseball did in fact realign in 1994, albeit in the form of three divisions in each league, and the addition of an expanded playoff format with the Wild Card.

=== Relationship with the owners ===
Vincent's relationship with baseball's owners was always tenuous at best. He resigned in 1992 after the owners gave him an 18–9 no confidence vote. Supportive votes came from ownership of the Baltimore Orioles, Boston Red Sox, Florida Marlins, Houston Astros, Kansas City Royals, Montreal Expos, New York Mets, Oakland Athletics, and Texas Rangers. The Cincinnati Reds abstained.

The owners were still angry at Vincent over his intervention during the 1990 lockout, and disappointed over upwardly spiraling player salaries, and dwindling television ratings in light of a $1.2 billion, four-year deal with CBS. The deal ultimately cost the network approximately $500 million beginning in 1990, Vincent's first full season as commissioner. CBS itself contributed to decreasing ratings thanks to their haphazard scheduling of Game of the Week broadcasts during the regular season to the point that fans grew tired of tuning into no baseball on summer Saturdays. until after the network had aired that year's NBA Finals (which was the last time CBS aired the Finals before the NBA's move to NBC Therefore, only 12 regular season telecasts were scheduled The broadcasts would have been on each Saturday from June 16 through August 25 and a special Sunday telecast on the weekend of August 11–12 (the New York Yankees against the Oakland Athletics in Oakland on both days). Ultimately, four more telecasts were added – two in April and two on the last two Saturdays of the season.

The owners accused Vincent of acting in a high-handed manner, especially in the Howe affair; Vincent reportedly "believes that the game is bigger than one person and he’s not afraid to take a controversial stance and stick with it" even if it was against public opinion. Vincent also "didn't see himself as a lackey whose job it was to massage the owner’s egos and do their bidding".

The leaders in the movement to oust Vincent were members of what The Sporting News later dubbed The Great Lakes Gang:

- Bud Selig, president of the Milwaukee Brewers;
- Jerry Reinsdorf, chairman of the Chicago White Sox;
- Stanton Cook, head of the Tribune Co., which owned the Chicago Cubs;
- Carl Pohlad, owner of the Minnesota Twins;
- Peter O'Malley, the longtime majority-owner of the Los Angeles Dodgers
- William Bartholomay, longtime part-owner and Chairman of the Atlanta Braves

In his farewell, Vincent said

To do the job without angering an owner is impossible. I can't make all twenty-eight of my bosses happy. People have told me I'm the last commissioner. If so, it's a sad thing. I hope they [the owners] learn this lesson before too much damage is done.

Vincent was never able to complete the five-year term that he had inherited from Bart Giamatti. Vincent contended that Major League Baseball made a huge mistake by not appointing his deputy commissioner Stephen Greenberg — the son of the Hall of Famer Hank Greenberg — as Commissioner. Vincent was replaced on an interim basis by Milwaukee Brewers owner Bud Selig, who was named the permanent replacement in 1998 and whose family continued to maintain ownership over the Brewers.

== Life after baseball ==
After stepping down from the commissioner's office, Vincent became a private investor and the president of the New England Collegiate Baseball League. Vincent served as the NECBL's president from 1998 to 2004. In 2001, when baseball owners voted to contract two clubs, Vincent criticized them for not consulting the players' union. In 2002, Vincent wrote his autobiography, The Last Commissioner: A Baseball Valentine.

In 2005, during an interview with Fox Sports Radio, Vincent shared his thoughts on the controversy surrounding Texas Rangers pitcher Kenny Rogers, who received a 20-game suspension for a tirade directed at two TV cameramen. Vincent believed that Rogers, who had a record of 9–4 with 2.45 ERA at the time of the incident, shouldn't have been allowed to play in the All-Star Game in Detroit. Vincent said

The All-Star Game is a great honor. Again, if you are trying to send a message to players to think twice before you do something stupid, one way to do that is by sending the message that, and by the way, if there is an All-Star Game, you're not going to get to play in that.

Vincent had been critical of Major League Baseball's handling of the strike in 1994. Some observers feel that Vincent's absence (or any other permanent commissioner at the time) could have been a decisive turn in finding a compromise agreement. While being interviewed for ESPN Classic's SportsCentury (about the year in sports in 1994), Vincent believed that the strike turned out to be a lost cause since the result was federal judge Sonia Sotomayor ruling that work had to resume under the previous collective bargaining agreement.

In March 2006, Vincent called on baseball to investigate (similar to the Dowd Report surrounding Pete Rose) possible steroids use by Barry Bonds, saying the cloud hanging over his pursuit of the home run record is a crisis akin to the Black Sox scandal from 1919:

I don't think it's an exaggeration to say it's the biggest crisis that's hit baseball since the '20s and the Black Sox scandal. The generic problem of steroids in baseball has been brought to a head by the Bonds situation. It's really an enormous mess because it has threatened all baseball records, everything that was done in the '90s forward is suspect because of the likelihood that lots of players were using steroids.

Vincent wrote in the April 24, 2006, issue of Sports Illustrated, that with most of Bonds' official troubles being off the field, and with the strength of the players' union, there was little Bud Selig could do beyond appointing an investigating committee. Vincent said that Selig is largely "an observer of a forum beyond his reach." On October 18, 2007, Vincent appeared with sportscaster Bob Costas at Williams College for "A Conversation About Sports", moderated by Will Dudley, associate professor of philosophy. On May 28, 1992, Vincent was awarded an honorary doctoral degree at Central Connecticut State University. He also gave the 1992 Vance Distinguished Lecture at the university.

On May 18, 2008, Fairfield University conferred an honorary Doctor of Laws degree on Vincent where he served on the Board of Trustees from 1991 to 2002. He created the Alice Lynch Vincent Scholarship Fund, which is based on need, there in memory of his mother in December 1996.

In April 2021, Vincent criticized commissioner Rob Manfred over Major League Baseball's decision to move that year's All-Star Game out of Atlanta in protest of the Georgia State Legislature's passage of the controversial Election Integrity Act of 2021, which overhauls voter access in the state. According to Vincent, Manfred made his decision "without first protesting the substance of the law."

== Personal life ==
Vincent married Valerie McMahon in 1965. They raised three children and divorced in 1994. Vincent's second marriage, to Christina Watkins was from 1998 until his death.

Vincent died from bladder cancer at a hospital in Vero Beach, Florida, on February 1, 2025. He was 86.
