= Ray Murphy (American football) =

American football coach (1940–2023)

Biographical details
- Born: July 27, 1940; New York City, New York, U.S.
- Died: July 16, 2023 (aged 82); Englewood, Florida, U.S.
- Education: State University of New York College at Cortland (1962)

Playing career

Football
- 1957–1960: Cortland / Cortland State

Track and field
- 1957–1961: Cortland / Cortland State
- Positions: Running back, defensive back (football)

Coaching career (HC unless noted)

Football
- 1961: Homer Central HS (NY) (assistant)
- 1962–1963: Hauppauge HS (NY) (OC)
- 1964–1966: Harborfields HS (NY) (assistant)
- 1967–1968: Mercy HS (NY)
- 1969: South Jefferson HS (NY)
- 1970–1971: Albany (OB)
- 1972: Albany (OC)
- 1973: East Stroudsburg (OC)
- 1974: Bridgeport
- 1975: Ohio State (assistant)
- 1976: Pittsburgh (assistant)
- 1977–1979: Kean
- 1980: Cranford HS (NJ)
- 1981: William Paterson (QB)

Administrative career (AD unless noted)
- 1977–1979: Kean (assistant AD)

Head coaching record
- Overall: 16–22–2 (college)

Raymond William Murphy (July 27, 1940 – July 16, 2023) was an American college football coach. He was the head football coach for Mercy High School—now known as Bishop McGann-Mercy Diocesan High School—from 1966 to 1967, South Jefferson High School from 1968 to 1969, the University of Bridgeport in 1974, Kean College of New Jersey—now known as Kean University—from 1977 to 1979, and Cranford High School in 1980.

== Biography ==
Murphy was born on July 27, 1940, in New York City. He attended St. Agnes Boys High School and the State University of New York College at Cortland, or simply Cortland, as a football and track athlete. As a member of the football team, Murphy was a running back and defensive back. He graduated from Cortland in 1962. He also later received his master's there.

Murphy began his coaching career in 1961, as an assistant for Homer Central High School. After one season, he joined Hauppauge High School as the team's offensive coordinator. In his first season, he helped lead the team to its best record in program history with a 4–3–1 record in the team's seventh season of play. Under his tutelage, his offenses players earned the nickname "Murphy's Marauders." In 1964 and 1966, he served as an assistant for Harborfields High School.

In 1967, Murphy earned his first head coaching position with Mercy High School—now known as Bishop McGann-Mercy Diocesan High School—as the team's inaugural coach. The team competed in the Interstate Catholic League (ICL) which housed local powerhouses La Salle Military Academy, St. Dominic's School, and Seton Hall High School. He began his tenure losing all eight games. The team began the season running the I formation before switching to single-wing at the suggestion of fellow conference member Pete Pizzarelli of Copiague High School. He served as head coach for two years before accepting the same position with South Jefferson High School. In his lone season with South Jefferson, he led the school to an undefeated record.

In 1970, Murphy accepted his first collegiate position as the offensive backfield coach and primary recruiter in a volunteer capacity for the start-up club program Albany, under head coach Bob Ford. Alongside Murphy, the six other assistants were either part-time graduate assistants or volunteers like himself. In 1972, he was promoted to offensive coordinator. He left the team in 1973 and was hired as the offensive coordinator for East Stroudsburg.

In 1974, Murphy earned his first opportunity as a college head coach when he was hired by Bridgeport as the sixth coach in the program's 25-year history. He succeeded Ed Farrell, who resigned to become the head coach for Davidson. Murphy was not the top choice for the head coaching position, in fact, he was slated to become an assistant coach before the leading candidate dropped out of the running. With a background as an offensive coach, he installed the triple option as the team's primary offensive playbook. He led the team to a 6–4 record before the school cut the football program. He spent the next two seasons as an assistant for Ohio State and Pittsburgh. Murphy interviewed for the offensive coordinator position for Northern Illinois after the resignation of Jack Dean. The position eventually went to the first African American offensive coordinator at the Division I level, Joe Redmond.

In 1977, Murphy was again hired as a head coach, this time for Kean. He brought with him an entirely new staff, including Arizona State assistant freshmen coach John Crea, who played under Murphy at Albany, as his assistant head coach and defensive backs coach. His initial roster consisted of mostly undersized underclassmen. He held the position for three seasons and amassed an overall record of 10–18–2. He was fired his third-straight losing season. In 1980, he returned to high school coaching as the head coach for Cranford High School. After one season he was hired as the quarterbacks coach for William Paterson. He coached only one season for the team before leaving coaching entirely.

After leaving coaching, Murphy started his own business. He died on July 16, 2023, in Englewood, Florida.

== Head coaching record ==
=== College ===
Year	Team	Overall	Conference	Standing	Bowl/playoffs
Bridgeport Purple Knights (NCAA Division III independent) (1974)
1974	Bridgeport	6–4			
Bridgeport:		6–4			
Kean Squires (New Jersey State Athletic Conference) (1977–1979)
1977	Kean	3–6–1	2–2–1	4th	
1978	Kean	3–7	0–5	6th	
1979	Kean	4–5–1	1–4	5th	
Kean:		10–18–2	3–11–1		
Total:		16–22–2			
