= John Crea =

American football coach and scout

Biographical details
- Born: September 27, 1951 (age 75)

Playing career
- 1970–1972: Albany
- Position: End

Coaching career (HC unless noted)
- 1973: Albany (assistant JV)
- 1974–1976: Arizona State (assistant freshmen)
- 1977–1979: Kean (AHC/DB)
- 1980: Frostburg State (OC)
- 1981: Holy Cross (OB)
- 1982–1988: William Paterson
- 1989–1991: Methodist

Administrative career (AD unless noted)
- 1992–2001: New York Giants (scout)
- 2001–2005: Miami Dolphins (scout)

Head coaching record
- Overall: 33–66–1

John F. Crea (born September 28, 1951) is an American former football coach and scout. He was the first head football coach for Methodist University Monarchs football team in Fayetteville, North Carolina. In three seasons, he compiled an overall record of 2–28, including two 0–10 seasons to start the new program. Crea was also the head coach at William Paterson University prior to Methodist and amassed a record of 31–38–1 from 1982 to 1988.

Crea played college football for Albany as an end. Upon graduating, he returned as the team's assistant junior varsity coach. From 1974 to 1976, while working on his master's degree, he assistant the freshmen team for Arizona State. In 1977, Crea rejoined his former offensive coordinator at Albany, Ray Murphy, as his assistant head coach and defensive backs coach at Kean. In 1980, he was hired as the offensive coordinator for Frostburg State. In 1981, he spent one season as the offensive backfield coach for Holy Cross before being named head coach for William Paterson.

== Head coaching record ==
Year	Team	Overall	Conference	Standing	Bowl/playoffs
William Paterson Pioneers (New Jersey State Athletic Conference / New Jersey Athletic Conference) (1982–1987)
1982	William Paterson	5–5	3–3	T–3rd	
1983	William Paterson	3–7	2–4	T–4th	
1984	William Paterson	2–8	1–5	7th	
1985	William Paterson	5–5	3–3	T–4th	
1986	William Paterson	6–3–1	3–2–1	3rd	
1987	William Paterson	7–3	4–2	T–3rd	
1988 Did Not Coach					
William Paterson:		28-31-1	16-19-1		
Methodist Monarchs (NCAA Division III independent) (1989–1991)
1989	Methodist	0–10			
1990	Methodist	0–10			
1991	Methodist	2–8			
Methodist:		2–28			
Total:		30-59-1			
