= Kobe College =

Private arts college in Nishinomiya, Japan

Coordinates: 34°45′39″N 135°21′07″E

- 神戸女学院大学
- The emblem of Kobe College
- Motto: Love thy God, love thy neighbor
- Type: Private
- Established: 1875
- President: Ken Ii
- Faculty: 84 full-time, 321 part-time
- Undergraduates: 2,635
- Postgraduates: 96
- Location: Nishinomiya, Hyōgo, Japan
- Campus: Suburban, 35 acres (0.1 km^{2})
- Mascot: None
- Website: www.kobe-c.ac.jp

Kobe College (神戸女学院大学, Kōbe jogakuin daigaku), abbreviated to KC, is a private non-sectarian liberal arts college located in Nishinomiya, Hyōgo, Japan. Chartered in 1948, it is the first women's college with university status in West Japan.

== History ==
Since its foundation in 1875, Kobe College continues to provide a well-balanced education for women based on Christian principles. This is expressed in the school badge and color designed in 1885 by E.M. Brown, the third college president. The motif of the school badge is the honewort which expresses the harmony of "body," "spirit," and "soul." The school color is dark blue which expresses "peace" and "truth."

=== History ===
1873: Eliza Talcott and Julia Elizabeth Dudley, two Congregational missionaries from Rockford, the US as members of the American Board of Commissioners for Foreign Missions, opened a private school at Hanakuma-mura, Kōbe.

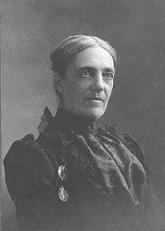
Eliza Talcott (May 22, 1836-November 1, 1911)

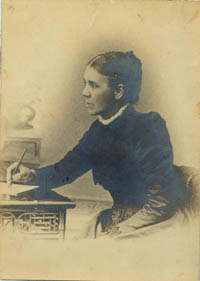
Julia Elizabeth Dudley (?, 1840-June 12, 1906)

1875: The two missionaries founded a boarding school for young women so-called "Kōbe Home" (神戸ホーム), on Yamamoto Street in Kōbe.

1879: Kōbe Home was renamed Kōbe Girls' School (女學校, jogakkō); the following year it was organized along a five-year (high school) curriculum, unique at that time. The school changed its name to Kōbe Eiwa-jogakkō (神戸英和女学校)."

1885: A one-year college division was established.

1891: A three-year curriculum in the college division initiated full-scale, higher education for women.

1894: Kōbe Eiwa-jogakkō was renamed Kobe College (神戸女学院, Kōbe jogakuin).

1906: A Department of Music was founded.

1909: A four-year higher education division was founded.

1919: The higher education division was granted a permit to use the term university (大学, "daigaku") in its Japanese name.

1920: Charlotte B. DeForest, the president of Kobe College, discussed the incorporated entity for fundraising to support the construction of a new campus, which is now on Okayama. As an independent organization, the Kobe College Corporation is incorporated in Illinois, U.S.A.

=== Kobe College graduate school ===
1933: The new campus is dedicated to Okayama, Nishinomiya, and Hyōgo Prefecture.

1965: A graduate course was established with two specialties: English literature and sociology.

1989: English literature specialty was installed.

2002: A course was established in comparison culturology specialty in the last part of a doctor.

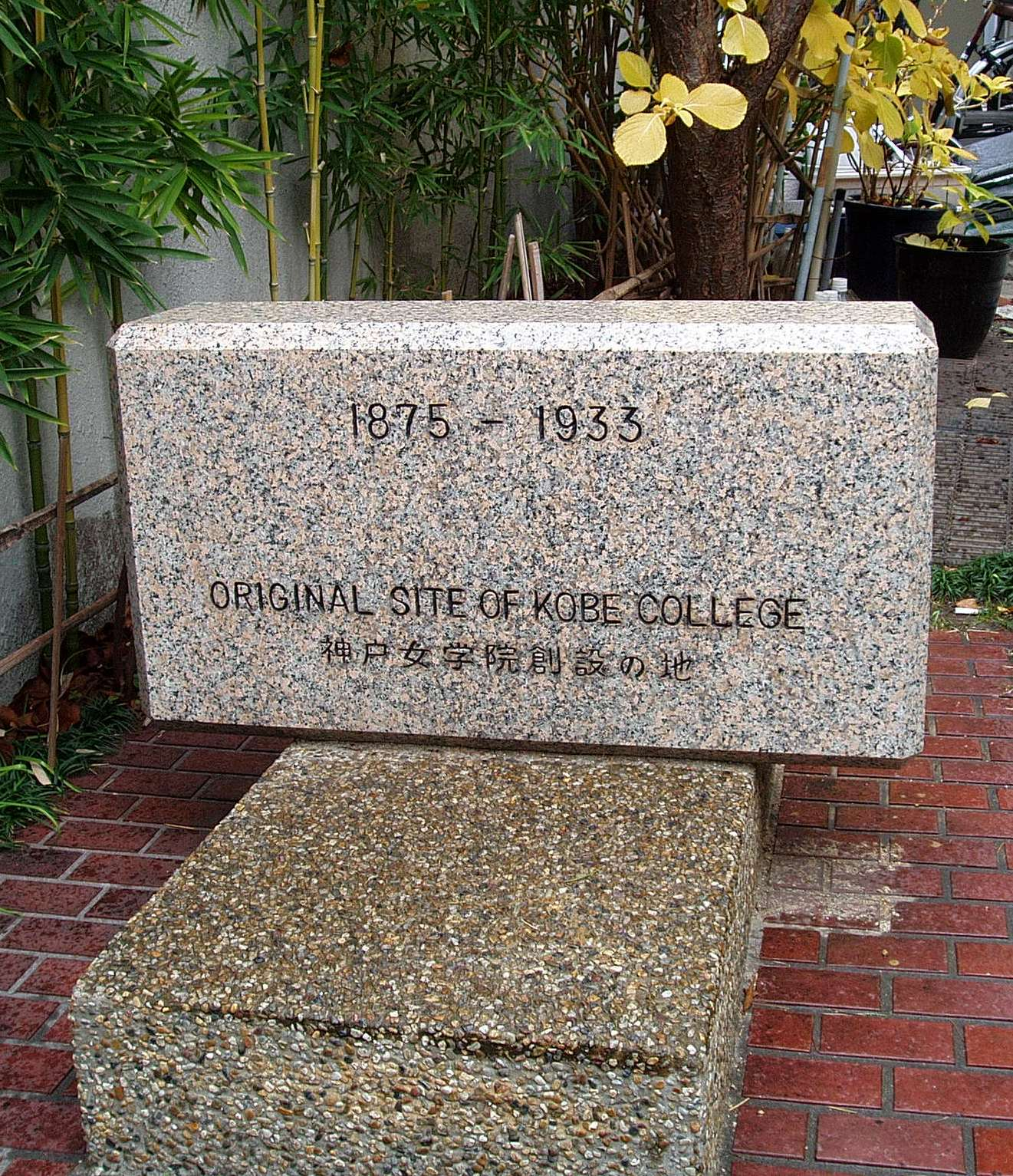
The first school building was located on a hillside in Kōbe.

== Campus ==
The college was originally located on Yamamoto Street in Kōbe, Japan. It is now located in Okadayama Town in Nishinomiya City on the Hankyu Train Line. The property was previously owned by the Sakurai family of the Matsudaira clan, a branch to the Shōgun family.

The original main buildings managed to withstand the Great Hanshin-Awaji earthquake of 1995 with far less damage than many recently built structures.

When the college was relocated to the present Okadayama campus in 1933, Dr. William Merrell Vories, the leader of the Omi Mission and renowned architect, designed the original buildings in accordance with the key principle: an architect's happiness lies in building beautiful buildings and bringing happiness to their users. The architectural design on campus reflects this belief. The southern Mediterranean style buildings with ivory colored walls and bronze-colored tile roofs were reputed to be the most magnificent in the country.

=== Architecture ===
Dr. Vories designed for universities and many other educational institutes including Kwansei Gakuin University and Doshisha University in Japan, and Ewha Womans University in Seoul, South Korea. Main halls on the college's campus are unique among other such architecture as they have been designated as the important cultural properties by the Japanese government in 2014, while a few of Vories' architectures are registered as tangible cultural property.

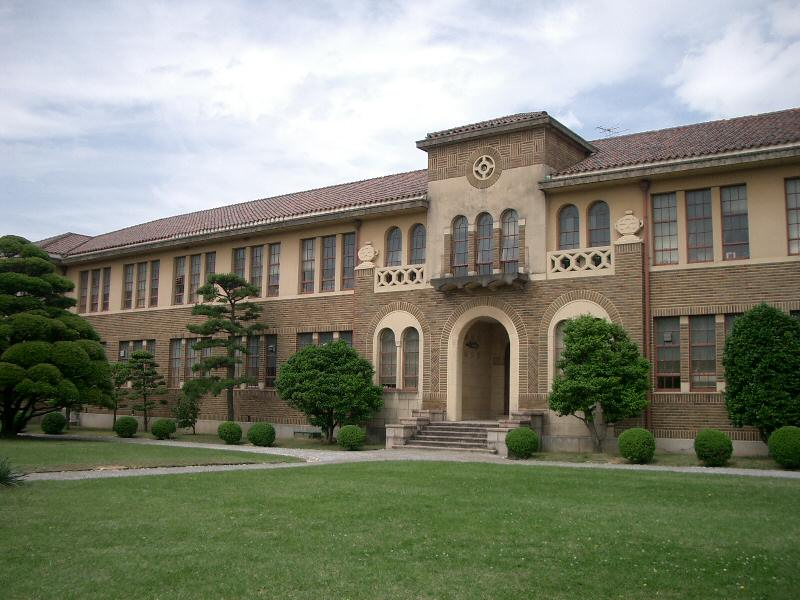
Science Hall

Roofs: roof tiles on the original Vories buildings are so unique in color and shape that it was very difficult to restore the roof after the 1995 Great Hanshin earthquake in Kōbe.

Floors: Similarly, unlike most Japanese universities built around the same period, the floors are set with cut marble reflecting the architect's concept that those floors would absorb heat better and keep cooler temperatures in the summertime. Further, the floors have a convex surface, or the edges of the floor is sloped so that cleaning would be easier.

== Students ==
There are 2,624 students on campus and 624 of them are freshmen. Kobe College has five departments: English, general culture, music, psychology, and Biosphere Sciences. Students, especially those who belong to the general culture department, can learn a wide range of subjects in the first two years to find their interests and decide what to study in the next two years. At Kobe College, students can study in small classes; they can focus on their study and the relationship between students and teachers can be much closer.

Most of the students are from the Kansai area which spans from Kōbe to Osaka and extends to Kyoto cities; however, there are some students who are from western Japan or other parts of Japan, and the college offers Mary and Grace Stowe Dormitories on campus for them with 179 single rooms. Other students stay in apartments along the Hankyu Line.

The college has accepted international students. Over 10 students from abroad are studying on campus this year. The college has exchange programs with overseas universities. Inbound students come from Australia and the United States. Every year outbound Kobe College students are sent over to the partner universities and affiliated Institutions.

Requirements for the undergraduate students are 124 credits over four years to complete the course. While they focus on studying, they enjoy other activities outside of school: for example, sports, music or art classes, group activities, and a part-time job.

The rate of employment at popular companies is the highest among women's colleges in Kansai or Kyoto-Osaka-Kōbe metropolitan area. The rate of employment in 2006 was 98.1%. Psychology students had 100% employment.

== Affiliated Institutions ==
The college exchanges students with overseas educational institutions.
United States

- Bowling Green State University
- Chatham University
- Rockford University
- University of California, Irvine
- University of Wyoming

Canada

- York University

France

- Centre for Applied Linguistics at University of Franche-Comté (Centre de linguistique appliquée de Besançon)

United Kingdom

- Anglia Ruskin University
- Newcastle University
- Oriel College, Oxford
- Royal Holloway, University of London
- Queen Margaret University
- University of Bristol
- University of East Anglia
- University of Newcastle
- University of Nottingham
- University of York

China

- Guangdong University of Foreign Studies

South Korea

- Ewha Womans University
- Duksung Women's University

Philippines

- Assumption College
- Miriam College

Australia

- Deakin University
- University of Queensland
- University of the Sunshine Coast
- University of Western Australia

New Zealand

- University of Waikato

== Bibliography ==
- Noriko Ishii, “Crossing Boundaries of Womanhood: Professionalization and American Women Missionaries' Quest for Higher Education in Meiji Japan,” Journal of American and Canadian Studies 19 (2001): 85–122.
- Takeuchi, Masao (2000). Far and Beyond: Story of Kobe Women's College of Theology. (Japanese). Kyobunkan. ISBN 4-7642-6549-4.
- Taniguchi, Toshikazu (1986). Rest in Peace, Deciples: Story of Kobe Foreign Cemetery. (Japanese). Kobe Newspaper Publication. ISBN 4-87521-447-2.
