= Bishop McGann-Mercy Diocesan High School =

Location
- 1225 Ostrander Avenue; Riverhead, Suffolk County, New York 11901; United States; 40°56′8″N 72°40′19″W

Information
- Type: Private, Coeducational
- Motto: Serve the Lord with Gladness.
- Religious affiliation: Roman Catholic
- Established: 1956
- Founder: Sisters of Mercy
- Closed: 2018
- Dean: Charles Bender
- Principal: Deacon John Hogan
- Campus Director: Mr. Prochilo (ministry)
- Faculty: 53
- Grades: 7-12
- Enrollment: 435 (2008)
- Average class size: 20
- Colors: Green and Gold
- Song: Mercy Fight Song
- Team name: Monarchs
- Tuition: $9,400 (2015-16)
- Website: www.mcgann-mercy.org

Bishop McGann-Mercy Diocesan High School (formerly Mercy High School) was a Roman Catholic high school in Riverhead, New York on Long Island. It was operated by the Roman Catholic Diocese of Rockville Centre. The Diocese closed the school in 2018.

== History ==
Founded by the Sisters of Mercy in 1956, five sisters were sent from their Brooklyn convent to create and staff a co-educational high school on the East End of Long Island to be named Mercy High School. In the first year of operation, there were 47 students, using excess classrooms of the nearby St. John the Evangelist parish. In October 1962, a new building was dedicated by Bishop Walter Kellenberg of the newly formed Diocese of Rockville Centre which still serves as the present building. In 1992, it was decided that a junior high school was to be added to the already ninth through twelfth grades. In 2002, the Diocese of Rockville Centre and the Sisters of Mercy created a partnership to better enhance the needs of the school. In September 2003, the school's name officially changed to Bishop McGann-Mercy Diocesan High School, after Bishop John McGann, the Diocese's longtime leader, and the Sisters of Mercy signifying the partnership. The school's numbers swelled over the course of the next five years, following a time when some thought the school might close. The Diocese takeover saved the school from debt. Mr. Carl Semmler was the school's principal at that time. However, the school went on to close at the end of the 2018 school year. Deacon John Hogan served as the school's last principal during the 2017–2018 school year. Mr. Charles Bender continued on as the Dean of Students until the school's closure. Lisa Navarra served as the school's Assistant Principal until the school's closure, and was a former teacher at St. John the Baptist Diocesan High School. On March 12, 2018, the Diocese of Rockville Centre announced the school would close at the end of the 2017–2018 school year.

In 2020 The Peconic Bay Medical Center Foundation purchased the 24-acre site of the former McGann-Mercy Diocesan High School from the Diocese of Rockville Centre for $14 million. The Buildings Usage was for the hospital’s ongoing need for additional space during the Corona Virus Pandemic. as the hospital continues to evolve into a regional medical center.

== Performing arts ==
Bishop McGann-Mercy Diocesan High School's theatre department was recognized by the Teeny Awards on an annual basis in recent years, both for performances by student actors and the innovation of the director, Bob Kelly.
