= Colleen Ward (Miss Connecticut) =

American beauty pageant titleholder

- Born: 1992 or 1993 (age 33–34)
- Education: Central Connecticut State University
- Beauty pageant titleholder
- Title: Miss Greater Waterbury 2012; Miss Windham County 2015; Miss Connecticut 2015
- Major competition: Miss America 2016

Colleen Ward is an American beauty pageant titleholder from Wolcott, Connecticut, who was crowned Miss Connecticut 2015. She competed for the Miss America 2016 title in September 2015.

== Pageant career ==
=== Early pageants ===
Entering her hometown pageant, Ward vied for the Miss Wolcott 2011 title in November 2010 and for the Miss Wolcott 2012 title in November 2011 but failed to claim the crown both times.

On December 3, 2011, Ward won the Miss Greater Waterbury 2012 title. She competed in the 2012 Miss Connecticut pageant with the platform "Promoting Childhood Literacy: Encouraging a Healthy Mind for a Healthy Body" and a dance performance in the talent portion of the competition. She was not a finalist for the state title. She did not participate in the 2013 or 2014 Miss Connecticut pageants.

=== Miss Connecticut 2015 ===
On January 17, 2015, Ward was crowned Miss Windham County 2015. She earned a $250 scholarship prize plus a package of prizes designed to help her prepare for the state pageant at the Mohegan Sun in Uncasville, Connecticut. She entered the Miss Connecticut pageant in June 2015 as one of 13 qualifiers for the state title. Ward's competition talent was traditional Irish stepdance. Her platform is "Promoting Childhood Literacy: Encouraging a Healthy Mind for a Healthy Life".

Ward won the competition on Saturday, June 27, 2015, when she received her crown from outgoing Miss Connecticut titleholder Acacia Courtney. She earned more than $8,500 in scholarship money and other prizes from the state pageant. As Miss Connecticut, her activities include public appearances across the state of Connecticut.

=== Vying for Miss America 2016 ===
Ward was Connecticut's representative at the Miss America 2016 pageant in Atlantic City, New Jersey, in September 2015. In the televised finale on September 13, 2015, she placed outside the Top 15 semi-finalists and was eliminated from competition. She was awarded a $3,000 scholarship prize as her state's representative.

== Early life and education ==
Ward is a native of Connecticut, and a 2010 graduate of Wolcott High School. Ward is a May 2015 graduate of Central Connecticut State University where she earned a Bachelor of Science degree in elementary education.

Awards and achievements
Preceded by Acacia Courtney	Miss Connecticut; 2015	Succeeded by Incumbent
