= Central Connecticut State University =

Public university in New Britain, Connecticut, US

Coordinates: 41.693°N 72.765°W

- Former names: State Normal School (1849–1933); Teachers College of Connecticut (1933–1959); Central Connecticut State College (1959–1983)
- Type: Public university
- Established: 1849; 177 years ago
- Parent institution: Connecticut State Colleges & Universities
- Academic affiliations: Space-grant
- Endowment: $80 million (2020)
- President: Kimberly Kostelis (interim)
- Administrative staff: 408 full-time professors 481 part-time professors
- Students: 10,039 (spring 2025)
- Undergraduates: 8,287 (spring 2025)
- Postgraduates: 1,752 (spring 2025)
- Location: New Britain, Connecticut, US
- Campus: Suburban, 165-acre (0.258 mi^{2})
- Colors: Blue and white
- Nickname: Blue Devils
- Sporting affiliations: NCAA Division I – NEC
- Mascot: Kizer the Blue Devil
- Website: CCSU

Central Connecticut State University (Central Connecticut, CCSU, Central Connecticut State, or informally Central) is a public university in New Britain, Connecticut. Founded in 1849 as the State Normal School, CCSU is Connecticut's oldest publicly-funded university. It is made up of five schools: the Ammon College of Liberal Arts and Social Sciences; the College of Health and Rehabilitation Sciences; the School of Business; the School of Education and Professional Studies; and the School of Engineering, Science, and Technology. As of Spring 2022, the university was attended by 8,898 students: 7,054 undergraduate students and 1,844 graduate students. More than half of students live off campus and 96 percent are Connecticut residents. The school is part of the Connecticut State Colleges & Universities system (CSCU), which also oversees Eastern, Western, and Southern Connecticut State Universities.

== History ==
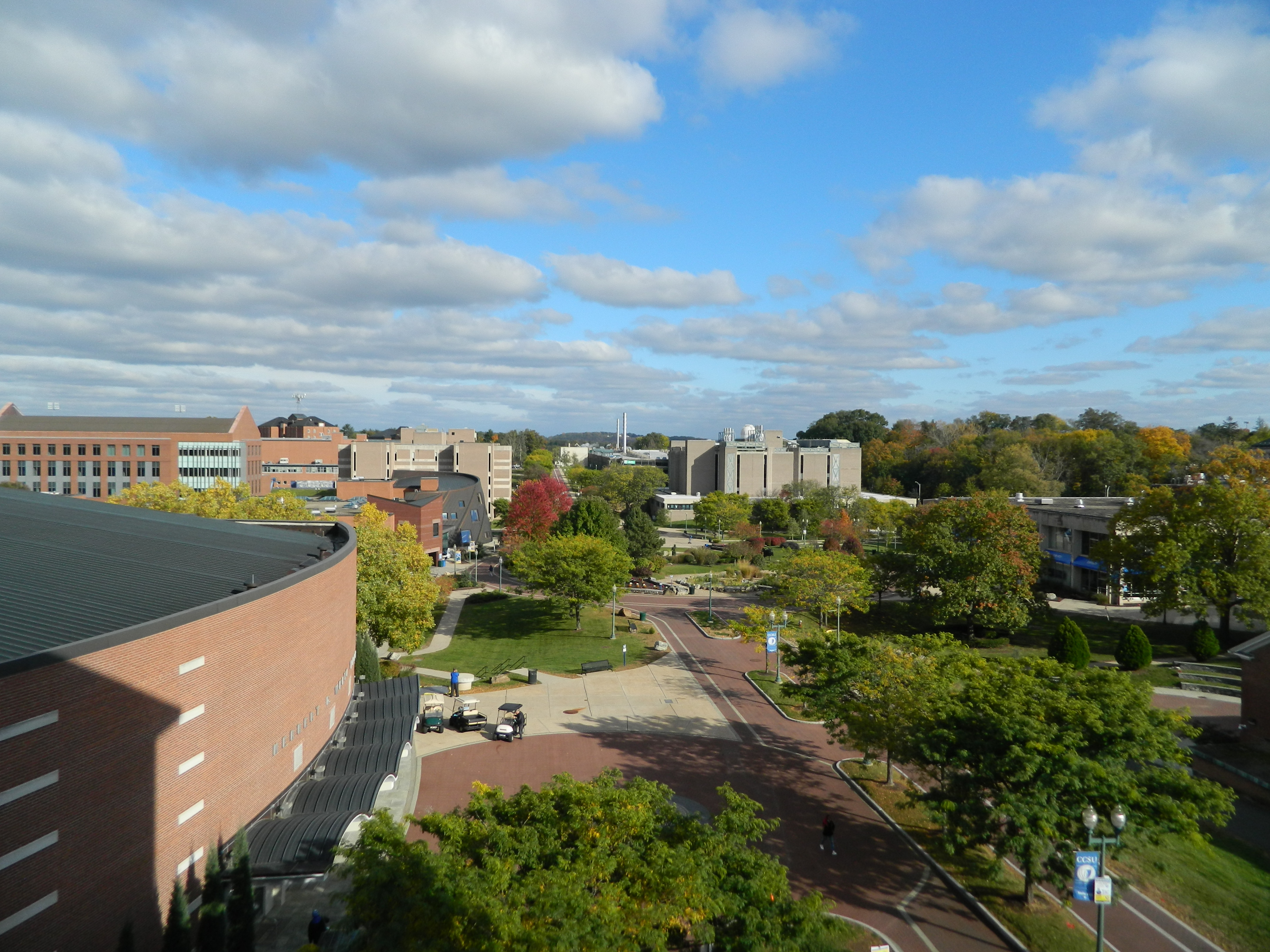
View over campus from the west

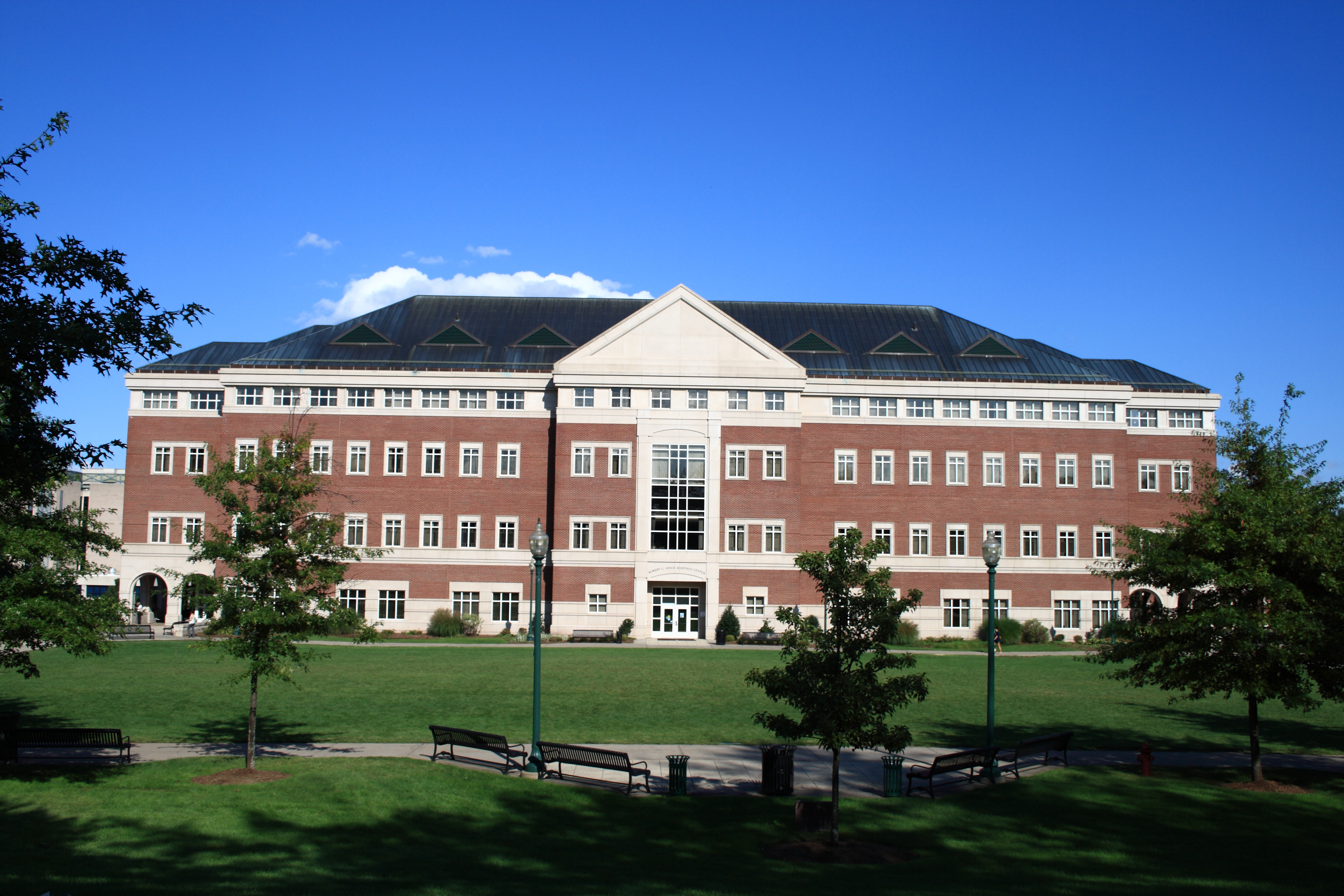
Vance Academic Center

Central Connecticut State University was founded in 1849 as the State Normal School to train teachers. It was the sixth normal school in the United States and is the oldest public university in Connecticut. It ran until 1867 when the school was temporarily closed due to opposition in the Connecticut General Assembly. Two years later, the Normal School resumed its services and continued to do so until the 1930s. In 1933, the Connecticut General Assembly created the Teachers College of Connecticut and the first bachelor's degrees were granted. In 1922, the campus moved to its current location on Stanley Street. In Fall 2023, the university unveiled its new logo.

The school was again renamed in 1959, becoming the Central Connecticut State College.

In 1983, the school transitioned from a college to a regional university and thus became Central Connecticut State University. Organizational governance changed in 2011 when the Connecticut Department of Higher Education was dissolved and replaced by the Office of Higher Education and the Connecticut Board of Regents for Higher Education.

== Facilities ==
Facilities include 10 academic halls, the Student Center, the Burritt Library, and numerous laboratories. Computer labs are available throughout campus, the largest of which is located in Marcus White Hall. Dining facilities are located in Memorial Hall, Hilltop Dining Center, and the Student Center. Additional computers and laboratories are spread across all of the academic halls. Welte Hall, Maloney Hall, and the Student Center function as large gathering areas for events, music performances, and theater productions. Welte contains the main auditorium, and Kaiser Hall houses the main gymnasium, and houses an Olympic-size pool. Fitness classes are freely available to students in Memorial Hall, and fitness equipment is provided in four locations across campus through RECentral.

Administrative offices, including Admissions, the Registrar, and Financial Aid are located in Davidson Hall. New building projects have expanded liberal arts classroom space and made significant upgrades to all sports facilities.

=== Residence halls and commuters ===
Residence halls can accommodate up to 2,500 students in ten residence halls in two quads, which are split between the north and south ends of campus.

=== Recent projects ===
A new eight-story residence hall (Mid Campus Residence Hall) opened for occupancy in the Fall of 2015. The $82 million dorm features "suite" style rooms, in addition to a 2,000 square foot fitness facility, a kitchen on each floor, and a server kitchen and main lounge with a fireplace on the main floor. The Office of Residence Life is located on the first floor of the new facility.

By 2015, a new $37-million Social Sciences Hall, 4,300-square-foot Bichum Engineering Laboratory, and 12,500-square-foot Campus Police Station opened. In 2011, the first floor of the Elihu Burritt Library was renovated to create a new common area with seating, couches, computers, and food vendors. Arute Field and its adjacent practice and baseball fields also underwent extensive construction and renovation from 2010 through the present, including new football, soccer, track, and practice field turf. New football, track, and soccer stadium seating were added, as well as construction on the Balf–Savin baseball field.

== Academics ==
There are over 400 full-time faculty, 83% of whom possess the terminal degree in their field. Another 501 part-time instructors also teach at the university.

=== Rankings ===
Academic rankings

Regional
- U.S. News & World Report: 66 (tied) out of 171

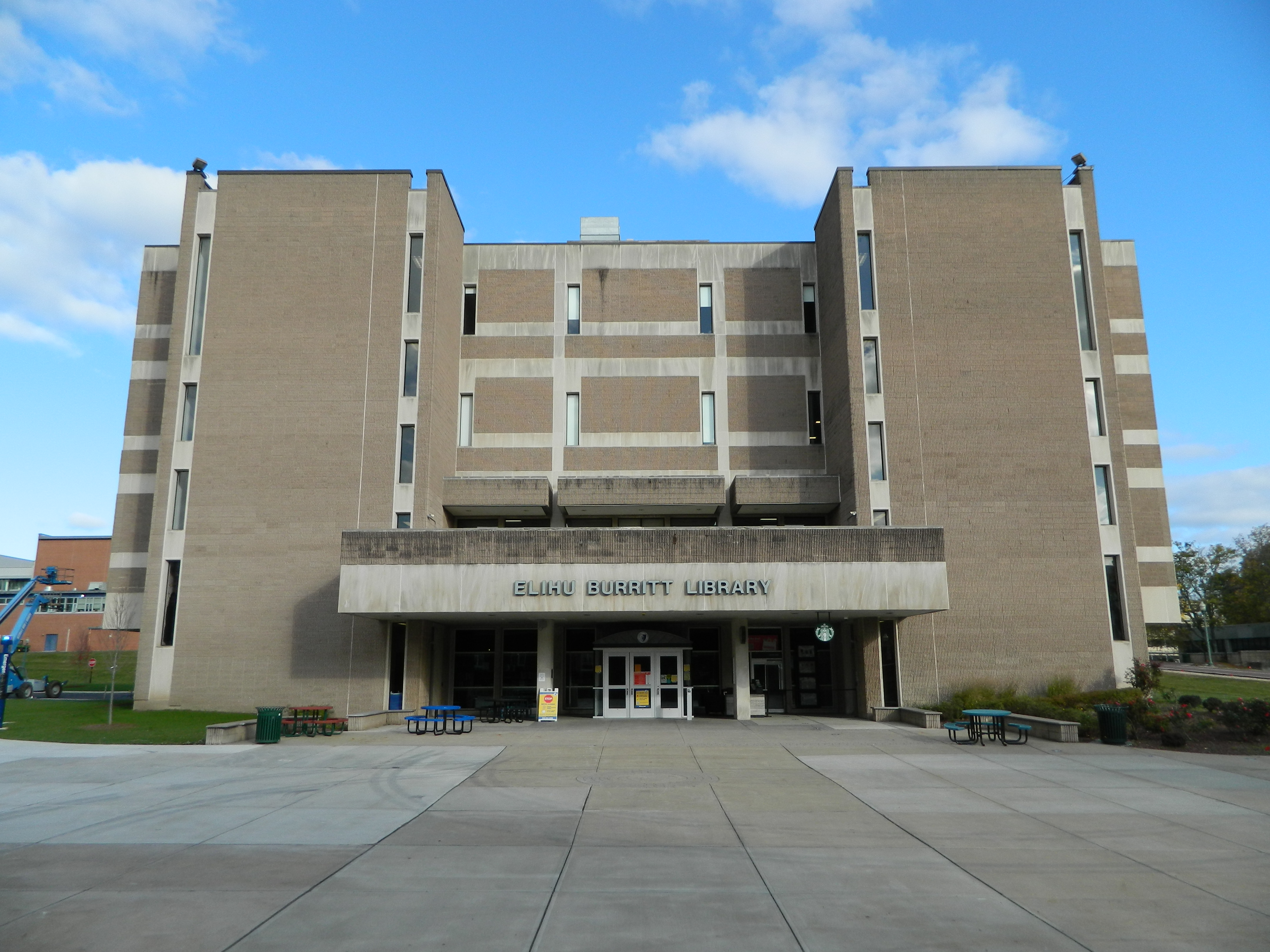
Elihu Burritt Library

In 2025, U.S. News & World Report ranked Central Connecticut State University tied for No.66 in Regional Universities North, tied for No.24 in Top Public Schools, No.50 in Best Value Schools, tied for No.190 in Best Undergraduate Engineering Programs at schools where a doctorate is not offered, tied for No.392 in Nursing, Nos.293-318 in Economics, tied for No.29 in Best Colleges for Veterans, 132 in Top Performers on Social Mobility.

=== Undergraduate admissions ===
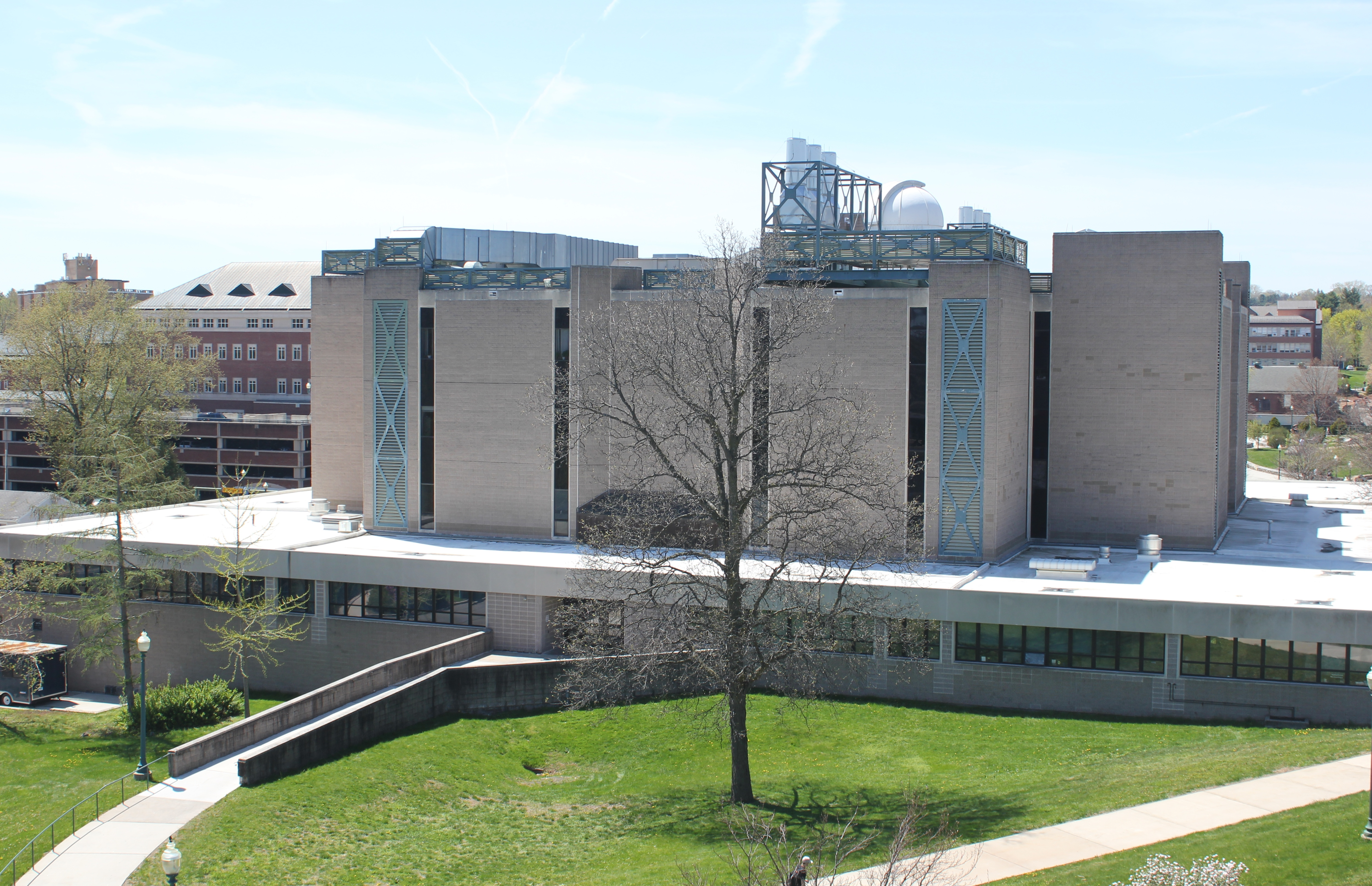
Copernicus Hall

In 2024, Central Connecticut State University accepted 76.7% of undergraduate applicants, with admission standards considered very easy, applicant competition considered very low, and with those enrolled having an average 3.2 high school GPA. The university does not require submission of standardized test scores, but they will be considered when submitted. Those enrolled that submitted test scores had an average 1050 SAT score (53% submitting scores) or an average 21 ACT score (1% submitting scores).

=== Graduate programs ===
Graduate programs are in all of the academic schools. These include programs in accountancy, education, literature, international studies, engineering technology, and information technology. A number of doctoral degrees are also offered.

== Student life ==
Student life primarily revolves around the attendance of clubs through the Club Central website.

Undergraduate demographics as of Fall 2023
| Race and ethnicity | Total |
|---|---|
| White | 54% |
| Hispanic | 20% |
| Black | 13% |
| Asian | 5% |
| Two or more races | 3% |
| International student | 2% |
| Unknown | 2% |
Economic diversity
| Low-income (Note: The percentage of students who received an income-based federal Pell grant intended for low-income students.) | 36% |
| Affluent (Note: The percentage of students who are a part of the American middle class at the bare minimum.) | 64% |

== Athletics ==
The university's athletic teams are known as the Blue Devils. Their mascot was originally named Victor E, but was changed to Kizer in 2011 after unveiling a new logo. Central Connecticut State participates in NCAA at the Division I (Football Championship Subdivision football) level as a member of the Northeast Conference. The university fields 18 varsity sports, eight men's sports: baseball, basketball, cross country, football, golf, soccer, as well as indoor and outdoor track & field; and ten women's sports: basketball, cross country, golf, lacrosse, soccer, softball, swimming, indoor and outdoor track & field, and volleyball.

== Notable alumni ==
=== Athletes and coaches ===
- Steve Addazio – college football coach
- Al Bagnoli – college football coach
- Ricky Bottalico – professional baseball player and sports journalist
- Dave Campo – professional football coach
- Joe Costello – professional football player
- Ryan Costello – professional baseball player
- Jake Dolegala – professional football player
- Justise Hairston – professional football player
- John Hirschbeck – Major League Baseball umpire
- Skip Jutze – professional baseball player
- Scott Pioli – NFL Executive; 3× PFWA Executive of the Year (2003, 2007, 2010)
- Rich Ranglin – professional football player
- Evan Scribner – professional baseball player
- Mike Sherman – college and professional football coach
- John Skladany – college football coach
- Bob Winn – distance runner
- Bob Zuffelato – professional basketball coach

=== Entertainers ===
- William Berloni – animal behaviorist known for training of animals for stage, film, and television
- Erin Brady – Miss Connecticut USA 2013, Miss USA 2013
- Richard Grieco – actor, 21 Jump Street, Booker
- Kenny Johnson – actor, The Shield, Sons of Anarchy
- Jimmy "Jomboy" O'Brien – sports media personality and podcaster
- Colleen Ward – Miss Connecticut 2015, contestant in 2015 Miss America pageant

=== Public servants ===
- Ebenezer D. Bassett – first U.S. African-American ambassador (to Haiti), appointed by President Ulysses S. Grant in 1869
- Miguel Cardona – Education Commissioner of Connecticut (2019–2021); United States Secretary of Education (2021–2025)
- Walter Eli Clark – last Governor of the District of Alaska and first Governor of the Alaska Territory, appointed by President William Howard Taft on May 18, 1909
- Carmen E. Espinosa – Justice of Connecticut Supreme Court, (2013–2021)
- Vincent Fort – member of the Georgia State Senate (1996–2017)
- Joshua Hall – Connecticut State Representative
- Bruce Hyer – Member of Canadian Parliament (2008–2015)
- Michael J. Ingelido – WWII fighter pilot, Distinguished Service Cross recipient, Air Force Major General (1960s)
- John Larson – Congressman (D-CT) (1999–present); former Connecticut Senate President
- Frances P. Mainella – 16th Director (2001–2006) of National Park Service
- Francis M. Mullen – head of U.S. Drug Enforcement Administration (1981–1985)
- Maria L. Sanford – educator (1870), has statue in Capitol's National Statuary Hall Collection for the state of Minnesota; namesake of Liberty ship, launched in 1943, SS Maria Sanford
- Erin Stewart – Mayor of New Britain (2013–present)

=== Other ===
- Justice Ofei Akrofi – Archbishop, Church of the Province of West Africa
- Frederic Beecher Perkins – editor, librarian and writer
- C.J. Stevens - Author of over 30 books
- Theodore Stowell – president of Bryant University, 1878–1916
- Eliza Talcott – missionary to Japan and founder of Kobe College

== See also ==
- The University of Connecticut is the largest public university in the state.
- Details regarding Commencement at Central Connecticut State University.
