= 2008 Utah Blaze season =

Football league season

- General manager: Jeff Russell
- Head coach: Danny White
- Home stadium: EnergySolutions Arena

Results
- Record: 6–10
- Division place: 3rd
- Playoffs: Lost Wild Card Playoffs (Crush) 44–49

The 2008 Utah Blaze season was the third season for this Arena Football League franchise. Despite losing their first nine games, the Blaze were able to finish the regular season with six wins in their last seven games, earning them a playoff berth as the fourth seed in the American Conference. In their wild card round game, however, they were defeated by the Colorado Crush, 44–49.

== Standings ==
Western Division
Team	W	L	PCT	PF	PA	DIV	CONF	Home	Away
San Jose SaberCats^{(2)}	11	5	.688	945	875	6–0	9–1	6–2	5–3
Arizona Rattlers^{(3)}	8	8	.500	842	907	1–5	3–7	3–5	5–3
Utah Blaze^{(4)}	6	10	.375	941	959	2–4	6–4	4–4	2–6
Los Angeles Avengers	5	11	.313	847	1004	3–3	4–6	4–4	1–7

== Regular season schedule ==
Week	Date	Opponent	Result	Record	Location	Attendance	Recap
1	March 1	Arizona Rattlers	L 62–63	0–1	EnergySolutions Arena	15,106	Recap
2	March 9	at Cleveland Gladiators	L 63–66	0–2	Quicken Loans Arena	14,765	Recap
3	March 14	at Orlando Predators	L 61–69	0–3	Amway Arena	11,861	Recap
4	March 21	Columbus Destroyers	L 49–52	0–4	EnergySolutions Arena	13,717	Recap
5	March 29	Georgia Force	L 49–70	0–5	EnergySolutions Arena	15,240	Recap
6	April 5	at Philadelphia Soul	L 56–64	0–6	Wachovia Spectrum	16,390	Recap
7	April 12	at Los Angeles Avengers	L 62–79	0–7	Staples Center	14,861	Recap
8	April 18	San Jose SaberCats	L 40–61	0–8	EnergySolutions Arena	14,701	Recap
9	April 25	at New Orleans VooDoo	L 56–70	0–9	New Orleans Arena	15,041	Recap
10	May 3	Kansas City Brigade	W 67–50	1–9	EnergySolutions Arena	12,208	Recap
11	May 10	Colorado Crush	W 71–36	2–9	EnergySolutions Arena	13,787	Recap
12	May 17	at San Jose SaberCats	L 64–74	2–10	HP Pavilion	13,252	Recap
13	May 24	Chicago Rush	W 51–48	3–10	EnergySolutions Arena	15,295	Recap
14	June 1	at Grand Rapids Rampage	W 63–56	4–10	Van Andel Arena	5,252	Recap
15	June 9	Los Angeles Avengers	W 65–56	5–10	EnergySolutions Arena	16,054	Recap
16	Bye Week						
17	June 21	at Arizona Rattlers	W 62–45	6–10	US Airways Center	13,542	Recap

== Playoff schedule ==
Round	Date	Opponent (seed)	Result	Location	Attendance	Recap
AC Wild Card	June 28	Colorado Crush (5)	L 44–49	EnergySolutions Arena	10,073	Recap

== Staff ==
2008 Utah Blaze staff
Head coach: Head coach – Ron James; Offensive coaches: Offensive coordinator – Tony Kimbrough; Defensive coaches: Defensive coordinator – Jeff Russell; Special teams coordinator – Scott Lieber

== Final roster ==
2008 Utah Blaze roster
Quarterbacks: 10 Joe Germaine; 17 Jason Gesser; Fullbacks: 34 Rodney Filer; 43 Kautai Olevao; Wide receivers: 1 Aaron Boone; 5 J. J. McKelvey; 23 Tom Pace; 15 Huey Whittaker	Offensive linemen: 98 Rob Gatrell; 77 Jake Kuresa; 72 Devin Wyman; Defensive linemen: 96 E. J. Burt; 95 John Culp; 44 Maurice Fountain; 52 Chris Janek; 55 Vaka Manupuna; 99 Dwayne Missouri	Linebackers: 19 Corey Dodds; 11 Kelvin Morris; Defensive backs: 9 Eddie Canonico; 24 Reggie Doster; 42 J'Sharlon Jones; 2 Damon Mason; Kickers: 13 Steve Videtich	Injury reserve: 4 Orshawante Bryant DB (IR); 59 Eddie Keele OL (IR); 56 Tupe Peko OL (IR); Refused to report: currently vacant; Other league exempt: currently vacant; Suspension: currently vacant; Practice squad: -- Kyle Gunther OL; 18 David Sutton WR; rookies in italics Roster updated October 7, 2008; 24 Active, 3 Inactive, 2 PS → More rosters

== Regular season ==
=== Week 1: at Utah Blaze ===
Quarter	1	2	3	4	Total
ARZ	14	21	14	14	63
UTA	21	21	7	13	62

at EnergySolutions Arena, Salt Lake City, Utah

- Date: March 1
- Game time: 9:00 PM EST
- Game attendance: 15,106

Game information

1st Quarter:

- 12:35 ARI – NICKERSON 4 yd pass from CAMPBELL (WITCZAK kick) – 7–0 ARZ
- 07:26 UTA – WHITTAKER 2 yd run (VIDETICH kick) – 7–7
- 05:10 UTA – MANUPUNA 5 yd fumble recovery (VIDETICH kick) – 14–7 UTA
- 03:17 ARI – NICKERSON 27 yd pass from CAMPBELL (WITCZAK kick) – 14–14
- 01:58 UTA – WHITTAKER 40 yd pass from GERMAINE (VIDETICH kick) – 21–14 UTA

2nd Quarter:

- 11:21 ARZ – HARVEY 14 yd pass from CAMPBELL (WITCZAK kick) – 21–21
- 08:57 UTA – BOONE 8 yd pass from GERMAINE (VIDETICH kick) – 28–21 UTA
- 07:45 UTA – DOSTER 8 yd interception return (VIDETICH kick) – 35–21 UTA
- 03:51 ARZ – HARRIS 11 yd pass from CAMPBELL (WITCZAK kick) – 35–28 UTA
- 02:06 UTA – WHITTAKER 29 yd pass from GERMAINE (VIDETICH kick) – 42–28 UTA
- 00:32 ARZ – NICKERSON 4 yd run (WITCZAK kick) 42–35 ARZ

3rd Quarter:

- 13:19 ARZ – JAMES 9 yd pass from CAMPBELL (WITCZAK kick) – 42–42
- 04:47 ARZ – JAMES 9 yd pass from CAMPBELL (WITCZAK kick) – 49–42 ARZ
- 02:01 UTA – JONES 9 yd pass from GERMAINE (VIDETICH kick) – 49–49

4th Quarter:

- 10:35 UTA – JONES 9 yd pass from GERMAINE (VIDETICH kick) – 56–59 UTA
- 07:00 ARZ – NICKERSON 5 yd pass from CAMPBELL (WITCZAK kick) – 56–56
- 05:45 UTA – WHITTAKER 2 yd run (VIDETICH kick failed) – 62–56 UTA
- 00:57 ARZ – HARVEY 6 yd pass from CAMPBELL (WITCZAK kick) – 63–62 ARZ
- Officials: Referee: Riley Johnson; Umpire: Rick Lowe; Linesman: Julian Mapp; Line judge: RG Detillier; Back judge: Bud McCleskey
- Offensive Player of the Game: Lang Campbell (ARZ)
- Defensive Player of the Game: Reggie Doster (UTA)
- Ironman Player of the Game: Kevin Nickerson (ARZ)

=== Week 2: at Cleveland Gladiators ===
Quarter	1	2	3	4	Total
UTA	14	15	7	27	63
CLE	9	23	13	21	66

at Quicken Loans Arena, Cleveland, Ohio

- Date: March 9
- Game time: 12:30 PM EST
- Game attendance: 14,765

Game information

1st Quarter:

- 12:41 UTA – Aaron Boone 14 yd pass from Joe Germaine (Steve Azar kick) – 7–0 UTA
- 07:51 CLE – Jason Ball 21 yd field goal – 7–3 UTA
- 04:53 CLE – Robert Redd 19 yd pass from Raymond Philyaw (Jason Ball kick failed) – 9–7 CLE
- 02:26 UTA – Huey Whittaker 25 yd pass from Joe Germaine (Steve Azar kick) – 14–9 UTA

2nd Quarter:

- 13:24 CLE – Cornelius Bonner 5 yd pass from Raymond Philyaw (Jason Ball kick) – 16–14 CLE
- 10:46 UTA – Aaron Boone 26 yd pass from Joe Germaine (Steve Azar kick) – 21–16 UTA
- 05:10 CLE – Ramon Richardson 1 yd run (Jason Ball kick) – 23–21 CLE
- 04:09 CLE – Sakeen Wright 7 yd interception return (Jason Ball kick blocked) – 29–21 CLE
- 00:09 UTA – Joe Germaine 2 yd run (Huey Whittaker rush) – 29–29
- 00:00 CLE – Jason Ball 46 yd field goal – 32–29 CLE

3rd Quarter:

- 11:30 CLE – Robert Redd 12 yd pass from Raymond Philyaw (Jason Ball kick) – 39–29 CLE
- 09:20 UTA – JJ McKelvey 8 yd pass from Joe Germaine (Steve Azar kick) – 39–36 CLE
- 06:26 CLE – Otis Amey 10 yd pass from Raymond Philyaw (Jason Ball kick blocked) – 45–36 CLE

4th Quarter:

- 14:55 CLE – Otis Amey 6 yd pass from Raymond Philyaw (Jason Ball kick) – 52–36 CLE
- 12:09 UTA – JJ McKelvey 15 yd pass from Joe Germaine (Steve Azar kick) – 52–43 CLE
- 09:34 CLE – Robert Redd 34 yd pass from Raymond Philyaw (Jason Ball kick) – 59–43 CLE
- 07:50 UTA – Huey Whittaker 16 yd pass from Joe Germaine (Joe Germaine pass failed) – 59–49 CLE
- 04:19 UTA – JJ McKelvey 5 yd pass from Joe Germaine (Steve Azar kick) 59–56 CLE
- 01:30 CLE – Marlion Jackson 1 yd run (Jason Ball kick) – 66–56 CLE
- 00:30 UTA – Huey Whittaker 8 yd pass from Joe Germaine (Steve Azar kick) 66–63 CLE
- Officials: Referee: Dave Lambros; Umpire: Wes Fritz; Linesman: Neil Brunner; Line judge: Paul Engleberts; Back judge: Tony Lombardo
- Offensive Player of the Game: Raymond Philyaw (CLE)
- Defensive Player of the Game: Sakeem Wright (CLE)
- Ironman of the Game: Robert Redd (CLE)

=== Week 3: at Orlando Predators ===
Quarter	1	2	3	4	Total
UTA	7	28	14	12	61
ORL	14	21	21	13	69

at Amway Arena, Orlando, Florida

- Date: March 14
- Game time: 7:30 PM EST
- Game attendance: 9,722

Game information

1st Quarter:

- 14:43 ORL – TOLIVER, T.T. 54 yd kickoff return (VAUGHN, John kick) – 7–0 ORL
- 05:14 UTA – MCKELVEY, J.J. 8 yd pass from GERMAINE, Joe (AZAR, Steve kick) – 7–7
- 00:00 ORL – JOHNSON, Ron 7 yd pass from STAFFORD, Shane (VAUGHN, John kick) – 14–7 ORL

2nd Quarter:

- 11:50 UTA – MCKELVEY, J.J. 9 yd pass from GERMAINE, Joe (AZAR, Steve kick) – 14–14
- 07:39 UTA – MCKELVEY, J.J. 9 yd pass from GERMAINE, Joe (AZAR, Steve kick) – 21–14 UTA
- 07:02 ORL – MOYE-MOORE, M. 2 yd run (VAUGHN, John kick) – 21–21
- 01:41 UTA – MCKELVEY, J.J. 12 yd pass from GERMAINE, Joe (AZAR, Steve kick) – 28–21 UTA
- 00:54 ORL – GESSNER, Chas 47 yd pass from STAFFORD, Shane (VAUGHN, John kick) – 28–28
- 00:33 UTA – GERMAINE, Joe 1 yd run (AZAR, Steve kick) – 35–28 UTA
- 00:07 ORL – TOLIVER, T.T. 20 yd pass from STAFFORD, Shane (VAUGHN, John kick) – 35–35

3rd Quarter:

- 12:05 UTA – MCKELVEY, J.J. 20 yd pass from GERMAINE, Joe (AZAR, Steve kick) – 42–35 UTA
- 09:57 ORL – TOLIVER, T.T. 26 yd pass from STAFFORD, Shane (VAUGHN, John kick) – 42–42
- 08:35 UTA – BOONE, Aaron 45 yd pass from GERMAINE, Joe (AZAR, Steve kick) – 49–42 UTA
- 04:07 ORL – MOYE-MOORE, M. 2 yd run (VAUGHN, John kick) – 49–49
- 01:57 ORL – MOYE-MOORE, M. 1 yd run (VAUGHN, John kick) – 56–49 ORL

4th Quarter:

- 11:43 UTA – WHITTAKER, Huey 3 yd run (AZAR, Steve kick failed) – 56–55 ORL
- 06:34 ORL – GESSNER, Chas 5 yd pass from STAFFORD, Shane (VAUGHN, John kick) – 63–55 ORL
- 01:01 UTA – BOONE, Aaron 5 yd pass from GERMAINE, Joe (WHITTAKER, Huey rush failed) – 63–61 ORL
- 00:27 ORL – TOLIVER, T.T. 5 yd pass from STAFFORD, Shane (VAUGHN, John kick failed) – 69–61 ORL
- Officials: Referee: Dave Lambros; Umpire: Doug Wilson; Linesman: Kelly Saalfeld; Line judge: Brian Matthew; Back judge: Rich Wilborn
- Offensive Player of the Game: BJ Cohen (ORL)
- Defensive Player of the Game: T.T. Toliver (ORL)
- Ironman Player of the Game: Marlon Moye-Moore (ORL)

=== Week 4: vs. Columbus Destroyers ===
Quarter	1	2	3	4	Total
CLB	13	7	14	18	52
UTA	14	21	0	14	49

at EnergySolutions Arena, Salt Lake City, Utah

- Date: March 21
- Game time: 9:00 PM EST
- Game attendance: 13,717

Game information

1st Quarter:

- 13:11 UTA – MCKELVEY 31 yd pass from GERMAINE (AZAR kick) – 7–0 UTA
- 11:01 UTA – MCKELVEY 23 yd pass from GERMAINE (AZAR kick) – 14–0 UTA
- 06:18 CLB – SHELLEY 1 yd pass from NAGY (LEWIS kick failed) – 14–6 UTA
- 01:47 CLB – NEAL 30 yd interception return (LEWIS kick) – 14–13 UTA

2nd Quarter:

- 12:44 UTA – WHITTAKER 10 yd pass from GERMAINE (AZAR kick) – 21–13 UTA
- 01:54 UTA – WHITTAKER 15 yd pass from GERMAINE (AZAR kick) – 28–13 UTA
- 00:54 CLB – MARSHALL 54 yd kickoff return (LEWIS kick) – 28–20 UTA
- 00:05 UTA – BOONE 7 yd pass from GERMAINE (AZAR kick) – 35–20 UTA

3rd Quarter:

- 11:05 CLB – WELLS 3 yd run (LEWIS kick) – 35–27 UTA
- 06:48 CLB – WELLS 4 yd run (LEWIS kick) – 35–34 UTA

4th Quarter:

- 14:52 UTA – WHITTAKER 5 yd pass from GERMAINE (AZAR kick) – 42–32 UTA
- 11:50 CLB – LEE 11 yd pass from NAGY (WELLS pass from NAGY) – 42–42
- 08:19 UTA – WHITTAKER 4 yd run (AZAR kick) – 49–42 UTA
- 03:36 CLB – MARSHALL 17 yd pass from NAGY (LEWIS kick) – 49–49
- 00:00 CLB – LEWIS 35 yd field goal – 52–49 CLB
- Officials: Referee: Bill McCabe; Umpire: Mike Delaney; Linesman: Shawn Hochuli; Line judge: Dirk Bell; Back judge: Jimmy Buchanan
- Offensive Player of the Game: Huey Whittaker
- Defensive Player of the Game: Tremaine Neal
- Ironman Player of the Game: N/A

=== Week 5: vs. Georgia Force ===
Quarter	1	2	3	4	Total
GA	14	21	14	21	70
UTA	7	21	0	21	49

at EnergySolutions Arena, Salt Lake City, Utah

- Date: March 29
- Game time: 9:00 PM EST
- Game attendance: 15,240

Game information

1st Quarter:

- 09:36 GA – Matt Huebner 2 yd run (Carlos Martinez kick) – 7–0 GA
- 07:48 GA – Stephen Cason 15 yd fumble recovery (Carlos Martinez kick) – 14–0 GA
- 01:58 UTA – Aaron Boone 9 yd pass from Joe Germaine (Steve Azar kick) – 14–7 GA

2nd Quarter:

- 14:16 GA – Carl Morris 8 yd pass from Chris Greisen (Carlos Martinez kick) – 21–7 GA
- 09:53 UTA – JJ McKelvey 4 yd pass from Joe Germaine (Steve Azar kick) – 21–14 GA
- 02:53 UTA – Huey Whittaker 20 yd pass from Joe Germaine (Steve Azar kick) – 21–21
- 00:58 GA – Charles Pauley 12 yd pass from Chris Greisen (Carlos Martinez kick) – 28–21 GA
- 00:33 GA – Tiger Jones 8 yd pass from Chris Greisen (Carlos Martinez kick) – 35–21 GA
- 00:00 UTA – Huey Whittaker 9 yd pass from Joe Germaine (Steve Azar kick) – 35–28 GA

3rd Quarter:

- 10:37 GA – Tiger Jones 8 yd pass from Chris Greisen (Carlos Martinez kick) – 42–28 GA
- 02:34 GA – Tiger Jones 22 yd pass from Chris Greisen (Carlos Martinez kick) – 49–28 GA

4th Quarter:

- 14:20 UTA – Huey Whittaker 18 yd pass from Joe Germaine (Steve Azar kick) – 49–35 GA
- 12:48 GA – Carl Morris 7 yd pass from Chris Greisen (Carlos Martinez kick) – 56–35 GA
- 09:24 UTA – Huey Whittaker 28 yd pass from Joe Germaine (Steve Azar kick) – 56–42 GA
- 08:15 GA – Tiger Jones 22 yd pass from Chris Greisen (Carlos Martinez kick) – 63–42 GA
- 02:38 UTA – Aaron Boone 11 yd pass from Joe Germaine (Steve Azar kick) – 63–49 GA
- 00:21 GA – Tiger Jones 19 yd pass from Chris Greisen (Carlos Martinez kick) – 70–49 GA
- Officials: Bill Athan; Umpire: Matt Jordon; Linesman: Allen Baynes; Line judge: Rusty Baynes; Back judge: Greg Wilson
- Offensive Player of the Game: Chris Griesen (GA)
- Defensive Player of the Game: Stephen Cason (GA)
- Ironman Player of the Game: Damien Groce (GA)

=== Week 6: at Philadelphia Soul ===
Quarter	1	2	3	4	Total
UTA	14	14	14	14	56
PHI	16	20	14	14	64

at Wachovia Center, Philadelphia, Pennsylvania

- Date: April 5
- Game time: 7:00 PM EST
- Game attendance: 16,390

Game information

1st Quarter:

- 12:07 UTA – WHITTAKER 15 yd pass from GERMAINE (AZAR kick) – 7–0 UTA
- 09:53 PHI – JACKSON 13 yd pass from D'ORAZIO (HUGHES kick) – 7–7
- 06:44 UTA – MCKELVEY 8 yd pass from GERMAINE (AZAR kick) – 14–7 UTA
- 03:55 PHI – D'ORAZIO 6 yd run (HUGHES kick) – 14–14
- 02:09 PHI – SAVE safety – 16–14 PHI

2nd Quarter:

- 11:23 PHI – JACKSON 9 yd pass from D'ORAZIO (HUGHES kick) – 23–14 PHI
- 10:02 PHI – JACKSON 7 yd pass from D'ORAZIO (HUGHES kick) – 30–14 PHI
- 08:24 UTA – BOONE 20 yd pass from GERMAINE (AZAR kick) – 30–21 PHI
- 04:55 PHI – JACKSON 7 yd pass from D'ORAZIO (HUGHES kick failed) – 36–21 PHI
- 00:22 UTA – FILER 2 yd run (AZAR kick) – 36–28 PHI

3rd Quarter:

- 11:04 UTA – WHITTAKER 8 yd pass from GERMAINE (AZAR kick) – 36–35 PHI
- 07:42 PHI – BIBLA 14 yd pass from D'ORAZIO (HUGHES kick) – 43–35 PHI
- 06:48 PHI – BROWN 4 yd fumble recovery (HUGHES kick) – 50–35 PHI
- 01:32 UTA – FILER 1 yd run (AZAR kick) – 50–42 PHI

4th Quarter:

- 11:59 PHI – SMITH 3 yd run (HUGHES kick) – 57–42 PHI
- 08:51 UTA – WHITTAKER 6 yd pass from GERMAINE (AZAR kick) – 57–49 PHI
- 06:39 PHI – JACKSON 19 yd pass from D'ORAZIO (HUGHES kick) – 64–49 PHI
- 02:36 UTA – FILER 1 yd run (AZAR kick) – 64–56 PHI
- Officials: Referee: Dennis Lipski; Umpire: Rick Nelson; Linesman: Brent Durbin; Line judge: Darrel Leftwich; Back judge: Reggie Smith
- Offensive Player of the Game: Chris Jackson (PHI)
- Defensive Player of the Game: Bryan Save (PHI)
- Ironman Player of the Game: Mike Brown (PHI)

=== Week 7: at Los Angeles Avengers ===
Quarter	1	2	3	4	Total
UTA	21	13	7	21	62
LA	23	21	28	7	79

at Staples Center, Los Angeles, California

- Date: April 12
- Game time: 10:30 PM EST
- Game attendance: 14,861

Game information

1st Quarter:

- 13:58 LA – LaShaun Ward 43 yd pass from Tim Hicks (David Davis kick) – 7–0 LA
- 10:50 UTA – J.J. McKelvey 17 yd pass from Joe Germaine (Steve Azar kick) – 7–7
- 07:13 LA – Kevin Ingram 12 yd pass from Tim Hicks (David Davis kick failed) – 13–7 LA
- 05:57 UTA – Huey Whittaker 16 yd pass from Joe Germaine (Steve Azar kick) – 14–13 UTA
- 03:00 LA – David Davis 29 yd field goal – 16–14 LA
- 01:03 UTA – Devin Wyman 19 yd pass from Joe Germaine (Steve Azar kick) – 21–16 UTA
- 00:15 LA – Timon Marshall 57 yd kickoff return (David Davis kick) – 23–21 LA

2nd Quarter:

- 11:39 UTA – Aaron Boone 10 yd pass from Joe Germaine (Steve Azar kick failed) – 27–23 UTA
- 04:47 LA – J.R. Tolver 10 yd pass from Tim Hicks (David Davis kick) – 30–27 LA
- 02:20 UTA – J.J. McKelvey 40 yd pass from Joe Germaine (Steve Azar kick) – 34–30 UTA
- 00:45 LA – LaShaun Ward 23 yd pass from Tim Hicks (David Davis kick) – 37–34 LA
- 00:00 LA – Josh Jeffries 3 yd net recovery (David Davis kick) – 44–34 LA

3rd Quarter:

- 12:17 LA – Clay Harrell 5 yd pass from Tim Hicks (David Davis kick) – 51–34 LA
- 10:22 UTA – J.J. McKelvey 0 yd fumble recovery (Steve Azar kick) – 51–41 LA
- 09:06 LA – LaShaun Ward 45 yd pass from Tim Hicks (David Davis kick) – 58–41 LA
- 05:02 LA – LaShaun Ward 26 yd pass from Tim Hicks (David Davis kick) – 65–41 LA
- 00:37 LA – Lonnie Ford 1 yd run (David Davis kick) – 72–41 LA

4th Quarter:

- 11:53 UTA – J.J. McKelvey 16 yd pass from Joe Germaine (Steve Azar kick) – 72–48 LA
- 07:39 UTA – Aaron Boone 8 yd pass from Joe Germaine (Steve Azar kick) – 72–55 LA
- 04:35 LA – Timon Marshall 24 yd pass from Tim Hicks (David Davis kick) – 79–55 LA
- 01:13 UTA – J.J. McKelvey 14 yd pass from Joe Germaine (Steve Azar kick) – 79–62 LA
- Officials: Referee: Dave Cutaia; Umpire: Al Granado; Linesman: Mike McCabe; Line judge: Art Lucky; Back judge: James Cole
- Offensive Player of the Game: Tim Hicks (LA)
- Defensive Player of the Game: Damon Wheeler (LA)
- Ironman Player of the Game: Josh Jeffries (LA)

=== Week 8: vs. San Jose SaberCats ===
Quarter	1	2	3	4	Total
SJ	7	27	3	24	61
UTA	10	17	6	7	40

at EnergySolutions Arena, Salt Lake City, Utah

- Date: April 18
- Game time: 9:00 PM EST
- Game attendance: 14,701

Game information

1st Quarter:

- 12:35 UTA – Kelvin Morris 45 yd fumble recovery (Steve Azar kick) – 7–0 UTA
- 08:53 SJ – Frank Carter 1 yd run (A.J. Haglund kick) – 7–7
- 01:49 UTA – Steve Azar 23 yd field goal – 10–7 UTA

2nd Quarter:

- 13:29 SJ – Jason Geathers 34 yd pass from Mark Grieb (A.J. Haglund kick) – 14–10 SJ
- 09:24 UTA – JJ McKelvey 13 yd pass from Joe Germaine (Steve Azar kick) – 17–14 UTA
- 06:31 SJ – James Roe 23 yd pass from Mark Grieb (A.J. Haglund kick) – 21–17 SJ
- 00:54 UTA – Steve Azar 28 yd field goal – 21–20 SJ
- 00:43 SJ – James Roe 14 yd pass from Mark Grieb (A.J. Haglund kick failed) – 27–20 SJ
- 00:36 UTA – Aaron Boone 8 yd pass from Joe Germaine (Steve Azar kick) – 27–27
- 00:06 SJ – James Roe 9 yd pass from Mark Grieb (A.J. Haglund kick) – 34–27 SJ

3rd Quarter:

- 11:12 UTA – JJ McKelvey 15 yd pass from Joe Germaine (Steve Azar kick failed) – 34–33 SJ
- 04:21 SJ – A.J. Haglund 26 yd field goal – 37–33 SJ

4th Quarter:

- 11:56 SJ – Cleannord Saintil 21 yd pass from Mark Grieb (A.J. Haglund kick) – 44–33 SJ
- 07:40 SJ – Frank Carter 1 yd run (A.J. Haglund kick) – 51–33 SJ
- 06:28 SJ – Jason Geathers 9 yd fumble recovery (A.J. Haglund kick) – 58–33 SJ
- 00:51 SJ – A.J. Haglund 47 yd field goal – 61–33 SJ
- 00:00 UTA – JJ McKelvey 1 yd pass from Jason Gesser (Steve Azar kick) – 61–40 SJ
- Officials: Referee: Dave Lambros; Umpire: Doug Wilson; Linesman: Kelly Saalfeld; Line judge: Brian Matthew; Back judge: Rich Wilborn
- Offensive Player of the Game: Mark Grieb (SJ)
- Defensive Player of the Game: Kelvin Morris (UTA)
- Ironman Player of the Game: Jason Geathers (SJ)

=== Week 9: at New Orleans VooDoo ===
Quarter	1	2	3	4	Total
UTA	7	7	14	28	56
NO	7	21	28	14	70

at New Orleans Arena, New Orleans, Louisiana

- Date: April 25
- Game time: 8:30 PM EST
- Game attendance: 15,041

Game information

1st Quarter:

- 10:01 UTA – Huey Whittaker 5 yd pass from Joe Germaine (Steve Azar kick) – 7–0 UTA
- 03:11 NO – Jordan, J. 15 yd pass from Wimprine, D. (Todd France kick) 7–7

2nd Quarter:

- 14:53 NO – Dudley, J. 37 yd pass from Wimprine, D. (Todd France kick) – 14–7 NO
- 11:48 UTA – J.J. McKelvey 16 yd pass from Joe Germaine (Steve Azar kick) – 14–14
- 05:36 NO – Jordan, J. 8 yd pass from Wimprine, D. (Todd France kick) – 21–14 NO
- 00:36 NO – Lynch, J. 1 yd run (Todd France kick) – 28–14 NO

3rd Quarter:

- 12:49 NO – DeAndrew Rubin 31 yd pass from Wimprine, D. (Todd France kick) – 35–14 NO
- 10:36 NO – Ross, I. 15 yd pass from Wimprine, D. (Todd France kick) – 42–14 NO
- 09:17 UTA – Aaron Boone 37 yd pass from Joe Germaine (Steve Azar kick) – 42–21 NO
- 08:10 NO – DeAndrew Rubin 9 yd pass from Wimprine, D. (Todd France kick) – 49–21 NO
- 04:53 UTA – Huey Whittaker 4 yd run (Steve Azar kick) – 49–28 NO
- 03:10 NO – Dudley, J. 25 yd pass from Wimprine, D. (Todd France kick) – 56–28 NO

4th Quarter:

- 11:54 NO – Jordan, J. 18 yd pass from Wimprine, D. (Todd France kick) – 63–28 NO
- 07:59 UTA – J.J. McKelvey 5 yd pass from Joe Germaine (Steve Azar kick) – 63–35 NO
- 07:19 UTA – Carlton Brown 4 yd net recovery (Steve Azar kick) – 63–42 NO
- 04:18 NO – Jordan, J. 11 yd pass from Wimprine, D. (Todd France kick) – 70–42 NO
- 00:57 UTA – Aaron Boone 26 yd pass from Joe Germaine (Steve Azar kick) – 70–49 NO
- 00:07 UTA – Huey Whittaker 3 yd pass from Joe Germaine (Steve Azar kick) – 70–56 NO
- Officials: Referee: Bill LeMonnier; Umpire: Mike Delaney; Linesman: Greg Shields; Line judge: Dave Chesney; Back judge: Billy Beckett
- Offensive Player of the Game: Danny Wimprine (NO)
- Defensive Player of the Game: Henry Bryant (NO)
- Ironman Player of the Game: Wendall Williams (NO)

=== Week 10: vs. Kansas City Brigade ===
Quarter	1	2	3	4	Total
KC	7	14	9	20	50
UTA	13	20	13	21	67

at EnergySolutions Arena, Salt Lake City, Utah

- Date: May 3
- Game time: 9:00 PM EST
- Game attendance: 12,208

Game information

1st Quarter:

- 12:43 KC – Ces'are Manning 17 yd pass from D. Bryant (Peter Martinez kick) – 7–0 KC
- 11:16 UTA – Huey Whittaker 8 yd pass from Joe Germaine (Steve Azar kick failed) – 7–6 KC
- 05:52 UTA – JJ McKelvey 27 yd pass from Joe Germaine (Steve Azar kick) – 13–7 UTA

2nd Quarter:

- 14:12 UTA – Huey Whittaker 2 yd pass from Joe Germaine (Steve Azar kick) – 20–7 UTA
- 08:45 KC – Jerel Myers 5 yd pass from D. Bryant (Peter Martinez kick) – 20–14 UTA
- 04:34 UTA – Aaron Boone 29 yd pass from Joe Germaine (Steve Azar kick) – 27–14 UTA
- 00:32 KC – D. Bryant 1 yd run (Peter Martinez kick) – 27–21 UTA
- 00:04 UTA – Huey Whittaker 5 yd pass from Joe Germaine (Steve Azar kick failed) – 33–21 UTA

3rd Quarter:

- 12:43 KC – Jerel Myers 31 yd pass from D. Bryant (Peter Martinez kick failed) – 33–27 UTA
- 09:33 UTA – Kautai Olevao 1 yd run (Jason Gesser pass failed) – 39–27 UTA
- 05:15 KC – Peter Martinez 58 yd field goal – 39–30 UTA
- 02:38 UTA – Joe Germaine 9 yd run (Steve Azar kick) – 46–30 UTA

4th Quarter:

- 11:49 KC – D. Bryant 3 yd run (Peter Martinez kick) – 46–37 UTA
- 10:13 UTA – Huey Whittaker 25 yd pass from Joe Germaine (Steve Azar kick) – 53–37 UTA
- 07:30 KC – Mike Horacek 13 yd pass from D. Bryant (Peter Martinez kick) – 53–44 UTA
- 06:33 UTA – JJ McKelvey 20 yd pass from Joe Germaine (Steve Azar kick) – 60–44 UTA
- 03:51 KC – Ces'are Manning 3 yd pass from D. Bryant (D. Bryant pass intcpt) – 60–50 UTA
- 01:30 UTA – Rodney Filer 15 yd pass from Joe Germaine (Steve Azar kick) – 67–50 UTA
- Officials: Referee: Perry Havener; Umpire: Tom Laverty; Linesman: Allen Baynes; Line judge: David Meslow; Back judge: Keith Washington
- Offensive Player of the Game: Joe Germaine (UTA)
- Defensive Player of the Game: Kelvin Morris (UTA)
- Ironman Player of the Game: J'Sharlon Jones (UTA)

=== Week 11: vs. Colorado Crush ===
Quarter	1	2	3	4	Total
COL	7	7	15	7	36
UTA	10	20	6	35	71

at EnergySolutions Arena, Salt Lake City, Utah

- Date: May 10
- Game time: 9:00 PM EST
- Game attendance: 13,787

Game information

1st Quarter:

- 08:25 UTA – JJ McKelvey 3 yd pass from Joe Germaine (Steve Videtich kick) – 7–0 UTA
- 06:30 COL – Willie Quinnie 28 yd pass from John Dutton (Deric Yaussi kick) – 7–7
- 01:05 UTA – Steve Videtich 21 yd field goal – 10–7 UTA

2nd Quarter:

- 13:05 COL – Aaron Hosack 6 yd pass from John Dutton (Deric Yaussi kick) – 14–10 COL
- 08:33 UTA – JJ McKelvey 7 yd pass from Joe Germaine (Steve Videtich kick failed) – 16–14 UTA
- 04:38 UTA – Huey Whittaker 8 yd pass from Joe Germaine (Steve Videtich kick) – 23–14 UTA
- 00:45 UTA – Rodney Filer 6 yd run (Steve Videtich kick) – 30–14 UTA

3rd Quarter:

- 12:25 COL – Chad Owens 23 yd pass from John Dutton (Aaron Hosack pass from DUTTON) – 30–22 UTA
- 06:57 UTA – Rodney Filer 7 yd pass from Joe Germaine (Steve Videtich kick failed) – 36–22 UTA
- 01:40 COL – Chad Owens 1 yd run (Deric Yaussi kick) – 36–29 UTA

4th Quarter:

- 14:11 UTA – Aaron Boone 9 yd pass from Joe Germaine (Steve Videtich kick) – 43–29 UTA
- 07:45 UTA – Reggie Doster 48 yd fumble recovery (Steve Videtich kick) – 50–29 UTA
- 03:40 UTA – JJ McKelvey 12 yd pass from Joe Germaine (Steve Videtich kick) – 57–29 UTA
- 01:58 COL – Willie Quinnie 16 yd pass from John Dutton (Deric Yaussi kick) – 57–36 UTA
- 00:52 UTA – JJ McKelvey 18 yd pass from Jason Gesser (Steve Videtich kick) – 64–36 UTA
- 00:44 UTA – Kelvin Morris 14 yd fumble recovery (Steve Videtich kick) – 71–36 UTA
- Officials: Referee: Pat Garvey; Umpire: Paul King; Linesman: Bill Ward; Line judge: Bob McElwee; Back judge: James DeBell
- Offensive Player of the Game: JJ McKelvey (UTA)
- Defensive Player of the Game: Reggie Doster (UTA)
- Ironman Player of the Game: J'Sharlon Jones (UTA)

=== Week 12: at San Jose SaberCats ===
Quarter	1	2	3	4	Total
UTA	14	28	7	15	64
SJ	14	28	15	17	74

at HP Pavilion at San Jose, San Jose, California

- Date: May 17
- Game time: 10:30 PM EST
- Game attendance: 13,252

Game information

1st Quarter:

- 13:22 SJ – ROE, James 4 yd pass from GRIEB, Mark (HAGLUND, A.J. kick) – 7–0 SJ
- 09:34 UTA – FILER, Rodney 1 yd run (VIDETICH, Steve kick) – 7–7
- 08:25 SJ – SAINTIL, Cleann 28 yd pass from GRIEB, Mark (HAGLUND, A.J. kick) – 14–7 SJ
- 06:13 UTA – WHITTAKER, Huey 22 yd pass from GERMAINE, Joe (VIDETICH, Steve kick) – 14–14

2nd Quarter:

- 14:54 UTA – MCKELVEY, J.J. 14 yd pass from GERMAINE, Joe (VIDETICH, Steve kick) – 21–14 UTA
- 13:38 SJ – WRIGHT, Rodney 41 yd pass from GRIEB, Mark (HAGLUND, A.J. kick) – 21–21
- 12:36 UTA – BOONE, Aaron 26 yd pass from GERMAINE, Joe (VIDETICH, Steve kick) 28–21 UTA
- 09:25 SJ – ROE, James 3 yd pass from GRIEB, Mark (HAGLUND, A.J. kick) – 28–28
- 04:58 UTA – WHITTAKER, Huey 3 yd run (VIDETICH, Steve kick) 35–28 UTA
- 00:42 SJ – GEATHERS, Jason 1 yd run (HAGLUND, A.J. kick) – 35–35
- 00:37 UTA – MCKELVEY, J.J. 11 yd pass from GERMAINE, Joe (VIDETICH, Steve kick) – 42–35 SJ
- 00:17 SJ – ROE, James 5 yd pass from GRIEB, Mark (HAGLUND, A.J. kick) – 42–42

3rd Quarter:

- 14:30 SJ – SAINTIL, Cleann 8 yd pass from GRIEB, Mark (HAGLUND, A.J. kick failed) – 48–42 SJ
- 07:38 UTA – WHITTAKER, Huey 10 yd pass from GERMAINE, Joe (VIDETICH, Steve kick) – 49–48 UTA
- 04:56 SJ – SAINTIL, Cleann 9 yd pass from GRIEB, Mark (HAGLUND, A.J. kick) – 55–49 SJ
- 03:38 SJ – WATSON, Steve safety – 57–49 SJ

4th Quarter:

- 13:35 SJ – HAGLUND, A.J. 24 yd field goal – 60–49 SJ
- 12:02 SJ – WRIGHT, Rodney 15 yd pass from GRIEB, Mark (HAGLUND, A.J. kick) – 67–49
- 05:34 UTA – WHITTAKER, Huey 6 yd run (VIDETICH, Steve kick) – 67–56 SJ
- 01:15 UTA – MCKELVEY, J.J. 7 yd pass from GERMAINE, Joe (WHITTAKER, Huey pass from GERMAINE, Joe) – 67–64 SJ
- 00:53 SJ – ROE, James 9 yd pass from GRIEB, Mark (HAGLUND, A.J. kick) – 74–64 SJ
- Officials: Referee: Dave Cutaia; Umpire: Wes Fritz; Linesman: Neil Brunner; Line judge: Art Lucky; Back judge: Tony Lombardo
- Offensive Player of the Game: Mark Grieb (SJ)
- Defensive Player of the Game: Garrett McIntyre (SJ)
- Ironman Player of the Game: Jason Geathers (SJ)

=== Week 13: vs. Chicago Rush ===
Quarter	1	2	3	4	Total
CHI	6	18	10	14	48
UTA	21	13	7	10	51

at EnergySolutions Arena, Salt Lake City, Utah

- Date: May 24
- Game time: 9:00 PM EST
- Game attendance: 15,295

Game information

1st Quarter:

- 10:15 UTA – BOONE 9 yd pass from GERMAINE (VIDETICH kick) – 7–0 UTA
- 09:04 UTA – FILER 3 yd run (VIDETICH kick) – 14–0 UTA
- 04:08 UTA – MCKELVEY 22 yd pass from GERMAINE (VIDETICH kick) – 21–0 UTA
- 01:10 CHI – MORGAN 7 yd pass from MICHNA (FRANTZ kick failed) – 21–6 UTA

2nd Quarter:

- 12:07 CHI – ORDWAY 55 yd missed FG return (MICHNA rush) – 21–14 UTA
- 06:04 UTA – BOONE 17 yd pass from GERMAINE (VIDETICH kick) – 28–14 UTA
- 00:58 CHI – MORGAN 5 yd pass from MICHNA (FRANTZ kick) – 28–21 UTA
- 00:24 UTA – WHITTAKER 21 yd pass from GERMAINE (VIDETICH kick failed) – 34–21 UTA
- 00:00 CHI – FRANTZ 41 yd field goal – 34–24 UTA

3rd Quarter:

- 14:30 CHI – HARRELL 45 yd pass from MICHNA (FRANTZ kick) – 34–31 UTA
- 10:44 UTA – FILER 1 yd run (VIDETICH kick) – 41–31 UTA
- 05:30 CHI – FRANTZ 22 yd field goal – 41–34 UTA

4th Quarter:

- 10:08 CHI – HARRELL 3 yd pass from MICHNA (FRANTZ kick) – 41–41
- 01:57 UTA – MCKELVEY 4 yd pass from GERMAINE (VIDETICH kick) – 48–41 UTA
- 00:43 CHI – MORGAN 6 yd pass from MICHNA (FRANTZ kick) – 48–48
- 00:00 UTA – VIDETICH 18 yd field goal – 51–48 UTA
- Officials: Referee: Tom McCabe; Umpire: Rick Podraza; Linesman: Rod Pearson; Line judge: Dana McKenzie; Back judge: Scott Helverson
- Offensive Player of the Game: Joe Germaine (UTA)
- Defensive Player of the Game: Damon Mason (UTA)
- Ironman Player of the Game: Steve Videtich (UTA)

=== Week 14: at Grand Rapids Rampage ===
Quarter	1	2	3	4	Total
UTA	21	21	14	7	63
GR	7	7	21	21	56

at Van Andel Arena, Grand Rapids, Michigan

- Date: June 1
- Game time: 2:00 PM EST
- Game attendance: 5,252

Game information

1st Quarter:

- 13:25 UTA – WHITTAKER 42 yd pass from GERMAINE (VIDETICH kick) – 7–0 UTA
- 07:46 GR – HIGGINS 27 yd pass from MACPHERSON (GOWINS kick) – 7–7
- 05:56 UTA – MCKELVEY 49 yd pass from GERMAINE (VIDETICH kick) – 14–7 UTA
- 03:21 UTA – MORRIS 4 yd fumble recovery (VIDETICH kick) – 21–7 UTA

2nd Quarter:

- 10:53 UTA – FILER 6 yd run (VIDETICH kick) – 28–7 UTA
- 07:49 UTA – FILER 1 yd run (VIDETICH kick) – 35–7 UTA
- 05:03 GR – MAGNER 4 yd pass from MACPHERSON (GOWINS kick) – 35–14 UTA
- 00:02 UTA – WHITTAKER 3 yd pass from GERMAINE (VIDETICH kick) – 42–14 UTA

3rd Quarter:

- 12:50 GR – HIGGINS 26 yd pass from MACPHERSON (GOWINS kick) – 42–21 UTA
- 12:02 UTA – JONES 56 yd kickoff return (VIDETICH kick) – 49–21 UTA
- 08:53 GR – HIGGINS 2 yd run (GOWINS kick) – 49–28 UTA
- 03:43 UTA – WHITTAKER 2 yd run (VIDETICH kick) – 56–28 UTA
- 01:28 GR – MAGNER 29 yd pass from MACPHERSON (GOWINS kick) – 56–35 UTA

4th Quarter:

- 11:05 GR – HIGGINS 1 yd run (GOWINS kick) – 56–42 UTA
- 04:25 GR – MACPHERSON 3 yd run (GOWINS kick) – 56–49 UTA
- 02:05 UTA – MCKELVEY 15 yd pass from GERMAINE (VIDETICH kick) – 63–49 UTA
- 00:26 GR – MACPHERSON 15 yd run (GOWINS kick) – 63–56 UTA
- Officials: Referee: Riley Johnson; Umpire: Tom Laverty; Linesman: Allen Baynes; Line judge: David Meslow; Back judge: Keith Washington
- Offensive Player of the Game: JJ McKelvey (UTA)
- Defensive Player of the Game: Kelvin Morris (UTA)
- Ironman Player of the Game: J'Sharlon Jones (UTAH)

=== Week 15: vs. Los Angeles Avengers ===
Quarter	1	2	3	4	Total
LA	14	16	14	12	56
UTA	14	14	17	20	65

at EnergySolutions Arena, Salt Lake City, Utah

- Date: June 9
- Game time: 10:00 PM EST
- Game attendance: 16,054

Game information

1st Quarter:

- 10:54 LA – WARD 8 yd pass from CUMBIE (FREDRICKSON kick) – 7–0 LA
- 09:03 UTA – WHITTAKER 15 yd pass from GERMAINE (VIDETICH kick) – 7–7
- 03:22 LA – INGRAM 8 yd pass from CUMBIE (FREDRICKSON kick) – 14–7 LA
- 01:21 UTA – CULP 24 yd pass from GERMAINE (VIDETICH kick) – 14–14

2nd Quarter:

- 14:54 LA – WARD 37 yd pass from CUMBIE (FREDRICKSON kick failed) – 20–14 LA
- 09:52 UTA – FILER 3 yd run (VIDETICH kick) – 21–20 UTA
- 04:08 LA – FREDRICKSON 29 yd field goal – 23–21 LA
- 00:58 LA – COBBINS 1 yd run (FREDRICKSON kick) – 30–21 LA
- 00:12 UTA – WHITTAKER 12 yd pass from GERMAINE (VIDETICH kick) – 30–28 LA

3rd Quarter:

- 13:57 LA – MAZE 8 yd interception return (FREDRICKSON kick) – 37–28 LA
- 12:04 UTA – BOONE 45 yd pass from GERMAINE (VIDETICH kick) – 37–35 LA
- 09:05 UTA – FILER 2 yd run (VIDETICH kick) – 42–37 LA
- 06:16 LA – COBBINS 1 yd run (FREDRICKSON kick) – 44–42 LA
- 03:11 UTA – VIDETICH 28 yd field goal – 45–44 UTA

4th Quarter:

- 13:12 LA – JEFFRIES 3 yd run (COBBINS rush failed) – 50–45 LA
- 06:46 UTA – WHITTAKER 5 yd pass from GERMAINE (GERMAINE rush failed) – 51–50 UTA
- 02:33 UTA – MCKELVEY 28 yd pass from GERMAINE (VIDETICH kick) – 58–50 UTA
- 00:24 UTA – MORRIS 14 yd fumble recovery (VIDETICH kick) – 65–50 UTA
- 00:00 LA – INGRAM 12 yd pass from CUMBIE (FREDRICKSON kick failed) – 65–56 UTA
- Officials: Referee: Bill LeMonnier; Umpire: Mike Delaney; Linesman: Greg Shields; Line judge: Dave Chesney; Back judge: Billy Beckett
- Offensive Player of the Game: Huey Whittaker (UTA)
- Defensive Player of the Game: Kelvin Morris (UTA)
- Ironman Player of the Game: Rodney Filer (UTA)

=== Week 16 ===
Bye Week

=== Week 17: at Arizona Rattlers ===
Quarter	1	2	3	4	Total
UTA	14	24	0	0	38
ARZ	0	13	19	0	32

at US Airways Center, Phoenix, Arizona

- Date: June 21
- Game time: 10:00 PM EST
- Game attendance: 13,542

Game information

1st Quarter:

- 13:31 UTA – Huey Whittaker 20 yd pass from Joe Germaine (Steve Videtich kick) – 7–0 UTA
- 07:00 UTA – JJ McKelvey 18 yd pass from Joe Germaine (Steve Videtich kick) – 14–0 UTA

2nd Quarter:

- 14:20 UTA – JJ McKelvey 22 yd pass from Joe Germaine (Steve Videtich kick) – 21–0 UTA
- 08:49 UTA – Steve Videtich 19 yd field goal – 24–0 UTA
- 07:07 ARZ – Siaha Burley 37 yd pass from Jeff Smoker (Eric Houle kick) – 24–7 UTA
- 01:40 ARZ – Chris Robinson 1 yd run (Eric Houle kick failed) – 24–13 UTA
- 00:52 UTA – Aaron Boone 9 yd pass from Joe Germaine (Steve Videtich kick) – 31–13 UTA
- 00:01 UTA – Aaron Boone 19 yd pass from Joe Germaine (Steve Videtich kick) – 38–13 UTA

3rd Quarter:

- 11:17 ARZ – Chris Robinson 1 yd run (Eric Houle kick failed) – 38–19 ARZ
- 06:16 ARZ – Trandon Harvey 31 yd pass from Jeff Smoker (Chris Robinson rush failed) – 38–25 ARZ
- 01:22 ARZ – Trandon Harvey 30 yd pass from Jeff Smoker (Eric Houle kick) – 38–32 ARZ

4th Quarter:

- No Scoring
- Officials: Referee: LAMBROS, Dave; Umpire: WILSON, Doug; Linesman: SAALFELD, Kelly; Line judge: MATTHEW, Brian; Back judge: WILBORN, Rich
- Offensive Player of the Game: N/A
- Defensive Player of the Game: N/A
- Ironman Player of the Game: N/A

== Playoffs ==
=== American Conference Wild Card: vs. (5) Colorado Crush ===
Quarter	1	2	3	4	Total
(5) COL	7	14	7	21	49
(4) UTA	14	10	7	13	44

at EnergySolutions Arena, Salt Lake City, Utah

- Date: June 28
- Game time: 4:00 PM EST
- Game attendance: 10,073

Game information

1st Quarter:

- 12:03 UTA – Aaron Boone 13 yd pass from Joe Germaine (Steve Videtich kick) – 7–0 UTA
- 06:18 UTA – JJ McKelvey 15 yd pass from Joe Germaine (Steve Videtich kick) – 14–0 UTA
- 02:15 COL – Robert Thomas 18 yd pass from John Dutton (Deric Yaussi kick) – 14–7 UTA

2nd Quarter:

- 12:18 UTA – Huey Whittaker 9 yd pass from Joe Germaine (Steve Videtich kick) – 21–7 UTA
- 08:38 COL – Wendall Williams 5 yd pass from John Dutton (Deric Yaussi kick) – 21–14 UTA
- 04:10 UTA – Steve Videtich 30 yd field goal – 24–14 UTA
- 00:13 COL – Wendall Williams 2 yd pass from John Dutton (Deric Yaussi kick) – 24–21 UTA

3rd Quarter:

- 12:09 COL – Chris Watton 1 yd pass from John Dutton (Deric Yaussi kick) – 28–24 COL
- 10:33 UTA – JJ McKelvey 17 yd pass from Joe Germaine (Steve Videtich kick) – 31–28 UTA

4th Quarter:

- 11:01 COL – Ben Nelson 1 yd pass from Robert Thomas (Deric Yaussi kick) – 35–31 COL
- 06:21 UTA – JJ McKelvey 23 yd pass from Joe Germaine (Steve Videtich kick failed) – 37–35 UTA
- 03:37 COL – Wendall Williams 4 yd pass from John Dutton (Deric Yaussi kick) – 42–37 COL
- 01:00 COL – Willie Quinnie 5 yd pass from John Dutton (Deric Yaussi kick) – 49–37 COL
- 00:36 UTA – Huey Whittaker 4 yd pass from Joe Germaine (Steve Videtich kick) – 49–44 COL
- Officials: Referee: Pat Garvey; Umpire: Jeff Carr; Linesman: Kelly Saalfeld; Line judge: Art Lucky; Back judge: Keith Washington
- Offensive Player of the Game: John Dutton (COL)
- Defensive Player of the Game: Eddie Canonico (UTAH)
- Ironman Player of the Game: Wendall Williams (COL)
