= 2008 Arizona Rattlers season =

Indoor football season

- Head coach: Kevin Guy
- Home stadium: US Airways Center

Results
- Record: 8–8
- Division place: 2nd
- Playoffs: Lost Wild Card Playoffs (Rampage) 41–48

The 2008 Arizona Rattlers season was the 17th season for the franchise. The Rattlers finished the regular season 8–8, and made the playoffs as the 3rd seed in the American Conference. They were eliminated from the playoffs in the wild-card round, losing to the Grand Rapids Rampage, 41–48.

== Standings ==
Western Division
| Team | W | L | PCT | PF | PA | DIV | CONF | Home | Away |
|---|---|---|---|---|---|---|---|---|---|
| San Jose SaberCats^{(2)} | 11 | 5 | .688 | 945 | 875 | 6–0 | 9–1 | 6–2 | 5–3 |
| Arizona Rattlers^{(3)} | 8 | 8 | .500 | 842 | 907 | 1–5 | 3–7 | 3–5 | 5–3 |
| Utah Blaze^{(4)} | 6 | 10 | .375 | 941 | 959 | 2–4 | 6–4 | 4–4 | 2–6 |
| Los Angeles Avengers | 5 | 11 | .313 | 847 | 1004 | 3–3 | 4–6 | 4–4 | 1–7 |

== Regular season schedule ==
| Week | Date | Opponent | Result | Record | Location | Attendance | Recap |
|---|---|---|---|---|---|---|---|
| 1 | March 1 | at Utah Blaze | W 63–62 | 1–0 | EnergySolutions Arena | 15,106 | Recap |
| 2 | March 10 | Los Angeles Avengers | L 33–65 | 1–1 | US Airways Center | 11,532 | Recap |
| 3 | March 15 | at San Jose SaberCats | L 43–63 | 1–2 | HP Pavilion | 13,625 | Recap |
| 4 | March 21 | New York Dragons | W 62–33 | 2–2 | US Airways Center | 11,689 | Recap |
| 5 | March 28 | at Chicago Rush | L 35–59 | 2–3 | Allstate Arena | 15,058 | Recap |
| 6 | Bye Week | | | | | | |
| 7 | April 13 | at Tampa Bay Storm | W 63–62 | 3–3 | St. Pete Times Forum | 16,413 | Recap |
| 8 | April 18 | New Orleans VooDoo | L 36–60 | 3–4 | US Airways Center | 11,749 | Recap |
| 9 | April 26 | Georgia Force | W 66–61 | 4–4 | US Airways Center | 10,444 | Recap |
| 10 | May 3 | at Los Angeles Avengers | L 59–66 | 4–5 | Staples Center | 13,511 | Recap |
| 11 | May 9 | San Jose SaberCats | L 42–63 | 4–6 | US Airways Center | 11,514 | Recap |
| 12 | May 17 | at Dallas Desperados | W 55–54 | 5–6 | American Airlines Center | 12,950 | Recap |
| 13 | May 24 | Grand Rapids Rampage | W 52–48 | 6–6 | US Airways Center | 12,559 | Recap |
| 14 | May 31 | at Orlando Predators | W 60–53 | 7–6 | Amway Arena | 12,821 | Recap |
| 15 | June 8 | at Kansas City Brigade | W 73–34 | 8–6 | Sprint Center | 12,210 | Recap |
| 16 | June 16 | Colorado Crush | L 55–62 | 8–7 | US Airways Center | 11,608 | Recap |
| 17 | June 21 | Utah Blaze | L 45–62 | 8–8 | US Airways Center | 13,542 | Recap |

== Playoff schedule ==
| Round | Date | Opponent (seed) | Result | Location | Attendance | Recap |
|---|---|---|---|---|---|---|
| AC Wild Card | June 30 | Grand Rapids Rampage (6) | L 41–48 | US Airways Center | 10,862 | Recap |

== Staff ==
2008 Arizona Rattlers staff
| Front office: CEO / majority owner – Ron Shurts; President – Chris Presson; General manager – Kevin Guy | Head coach: Head coach – Kevin Guy; Offensive coaches: Assistant head coach / offensive coordinator – Skip Foster; Offensive line coach – Kani Kauahi; Defensive coaches: Special teams coordinator / defensive line coach – Tony Bowick |

== Final roster ==
2008 Arizona Rattlers roster
| Quarterbacks: 12 Lang Campbell; 6 Jeff Smoker; Fullbacks: 31 Chris Robinson; Wide receivers: 5 Siaha Burley; 3 Todd Devoe; 23 Trandon Harvey; 2 David Saunders | Offensive linemen: 79 Steve Edwards; 89 Wendall Gaines; 75 Atlas Herrion; 60 Johnathan Ingram; 73 Steve Mascorro; 57 Eric Thomas; Defensive linemen: 90 Dustin Barno; 93 Mkristo Bruce; 77 Anttaj Hawthorne; 99 Darrell Shropshire | Linebackers: 19 Jerrian James; Defensive backs: 47 Keyuo Craver; 9 Terrance Joseph; 20 Chris McKenzie; 1 Isaiah Trufant; 8 Aric Williams; Kickers: 16 Eric Houle | Injured reserve: 33 Asi Faoa (IR); 43 Kurt Kahui LB (IR); 58 Jeff Ruffin DL (IR); 11 Jason Witczak K (IR); Refused to report: currently vacant; Other league exempt: currently vacant; Suspension: currently vacant; Practice squad: currently vacant; rookies in italics Roster updated June 21, 2008; 24 Active, 4 Inactive, 0 PS → More rosters |

== Regular season ==
=== Week 1: at Utah Blaze ===
| Quarter | 1 | 2 | 3 | 4 | Total |
|---|---|---|---|---|---|
| ARZ | 14 | 21 | 14 | 14 | 63 |
| UTA | 21 | 21 | 7 | 13 | 62 |

at EnergySolutions Arena, Salt Lake City, Utah

- Date: March 1
- Game time: 9:00 PM EST
- Game attendance: 15106

Game information

1st Quarter:

- 12:35 ARI – NICKERSON 4 yd pass from CAMPBELL (WITCZAK kick) – 7–0 ARZ
- 07:26 UTA – WHITTAKER 2 yd run (VIDETICH kick) – 7–7
- 05:10 UTA – MANUPUNA 5 yd fumble recovery (VIDETICH kick) – 14–7 UTA
- 03:17 ARI – Mr Queso 27 yd pass from CAMPBELL (WITCZAK kick) – 14–14
- 01:58 UTA – WHITTAKER 40 yd pass from GERMAINE (VIDETICH kick) – 21–14 UTA

2nd Quarter:

- 11:21 ARZ – HARVEY 14 yd pass from CAMPBELL (WITCZAK kick) – 21–21
- 08:57 UTA – BOONE 8 yd pass from GERMAINE (VIDETICH kick) – 28–21 UTA
- 07:45 UTA – DOSTER 8 yd interception return (VIDETICH kick) – 35–21 UTA
- 03:51 ARZ – HARRIS 11 yd pass from CAMPBELL (WITCZAK kick) – 35–28 UTA
- 02:06 UTA – WHITTAKER 29 yd pass from GERMAINE (VIDETICH kick) – 42–28 UTA
- 00:32 ARZ – NICKERSON 4 yd run (WITCZAK kick) 42–35 ARZ

3rd Quarter:

- 13:19 ARZ – JAMES 9 yd pass from CAMPBELL (WITCZAK kick) – 42–42
- 04:47 ARZ – JAMES 9 yd pass from CAMPBELL (WITCZAK kick) – 49–42 ARZ
- 02:01 UTA – JONES 9 yd pass from GERMAINE (VIDETICH kick) – 49–49

4th Quarter:

- 10:35 UTA – JONES 9 yd pass from GERMAINE (VIDETICH kick) – 56–59 UTA
- 07:00 ARZ – NICKERSON 5 yd pass from CAMPBELL (WITCZAK kick) – 56–56
- 05:45 UTA – WHITTAKER 2 yd run (VIDETICH kick failed) – 62–56 UTA
- 00:57 ARZ – HARVEY 6 yd pass from CAMPBELL (WITCZAK kick) – 63–62 ARZ
- Officials: Referee: Brian Waterman; Umpire: Rick Lowe; Linesman: Julian Mapp; Line judge: RG Detillier; Back judge: Bud McCleskey
- Offensive Player of the Game: Lang Campbell (ARZ)
- Defensive Player of the Game: Andy West (UTA)
- Ironman Player of the Game: Mr Queso (ARZ)

=== Week 2: vs. Los Angeles Avengers ===
| Quarter | 1 | 2 | 3 | 4 | Total |
|---|---|---|---|---|---|
| LA | 14 | 21 | 10 | 20 | 65 |
| ARZ | 7 | 14 | 0 | 12 | 33 |

at US Airways Center, Phoenix, Arizona

- Date: March 10
- Game time: 11:00 PM EST
- Game attendance: 11532

Game information

1st Quarter:

- 10:35 LA – MARSHALL, Timon 47 yd pass from CUMBIE, Sonny (DAVIS, David kick) – 7–0 LA
- 05:53 ARZ – BURLEY, Siaha 15 yd pass from CAMPBELL, Lang (WITCZAK, Jason kick) – 7–7
- 01:21 LA – INGRAM, Kevin 28 yd pass from CUMBIE, Sonny (DAVIS, David kick) – 14–7 LA

2nd Quarter:

- 12:11 ARZ – CAMPBELL, Lang 6 yd run (WITCZAK, Jason kick failed) – 14–13 LA
- 07:33 LA – WARD, LaShaun 30 yd pass from CUMBIE, Sonny (DAVIS, David kick) – 21–13 LA
- 03:51 LA – FORD, Lonnie 2 yd pass from CUMBIE, Sonny (DAVIS, David kick) – 28–13 LA
- 00:56 ARZ – BURLEY, Siaha 27 yd pass from SMOKER, Jeff (ROBINSON; Chris rush) – 28–21 LA
- 00:28 LA – WARD, LaShaun 32 yd pass from CUMBIE, Sonny (DAVIS, David kick) – 35–21 LA

3rd Quarter:

- 05:51 LA – DAVIS, David 26 yd field goal – 38–21 LA
- 00:16 LA – INGRAM, Kevin 10 yd pass from CUMBIE, Sonny (DAVIS, David kick) – 42–21 LA

4th Quarter:

- 13:13 LA – JEFFERIES, Josh 20 yd fumble recovery (DAVIS, David kick failed) – 51–21 LA
- 09:57 ARZ – FAOA, Asi 1 yd run (WITCZAK, Jason rush fumbld) – 51–27 LA
- 06:33 LA – MARSHALL, Timon 20 yd pass from CUMBIE, Sonny (DAVIS, David kick) – 58–27 LA
- 04:29 ARZ – BURLEY, Siaha 3 yd pass from SMOKER, Jeff (SMOKER, Jeff pass failed) – 58–33 LA
- 00:45 LA – FORD, Lonnie 1 yd run (DAVIS, David kick) – 65–33 LA
- Officials: Referee: MCCABE, Bill; Umpire: DELANEY, Mike; Linesman: HOCHULI, Shawn; Line judge: BELL, Dirk; Back judge: BUCHANAN, Jimmy
- Offensive Player of the Game: Sonny Cumbie (LA)
- Defensive Player of the Game: Wendall Gaines (ARZ)
- Ironman Player of the Game: Timon Marshall (LA)

=== Week 3: at San Jose SaberCats ===
| Quarter | 1 | 2 | 3 | 4 | Total |
|---|---|---|---|---|---|
| ARZ | 7 | 0 | 7 | 29 | 43 |
| SJ | 10 | 17 | 12 | 24 | 63 |

at HP Pavilion at San Jose, San Jose, California

- Date: March 15
- Game time: 10:30 PM EST
- Game attendance: 13,625

Game information

1st Quarter:

- 06:31 SJ – HAGLUND, A.J. 33 yd field goal – 3–0 SJ
- 03:32 ARZ – FAOA, Asi 4 yd run (WITCZAK, Jason kick) – 7–3 ARZ
- 01:07 SJ – SAINTIL, Cleann 22 yd pass from GRIEB, Mark (HAGLUND, A.J. kick) – 1000-7 SJ

2nd Quarter:

- 13:04 SJ – THOMAS, Clevan 16 yd fumble recovery (HAGLUND, A.J. kick) – 17–7 SJ
- 09:05 SJ – SAINTIL, Cleann 23 yd pass from GRIEB, Mark (HAGLUND, A.J. kick) – 24–7 SJ
- 00:11 SJ – HAGLUND, A.J. 18 yd field goal – 27–7 SJ

3rd Quarter:

- 12:54 ARZ – FAOA, Asi 1 yd run (WITCZAK, Jason kick) – 27–14 SJ
- 08:44 SJ – HAGLUND, A.J. 24 yd field goal – 30–14 SJ
- 05:15 SJ – TEAM safety – 32–14 SJ
- 04:11 SJ – GANT, Julius 12 yd pass from GRIEB, Mark (HAGLUND, A.J. kick) – 39–14 SJ

4th Quarter:

- 14:46 ARZ – JAMES, Jerrian 6 yd pass from SMOKER, Jeff (WITCZAK, Jason kick) – 39–21 SJ
- 13:40 ARZ – TRUFANT, Isaiah 5 yd net recovery (WITCZAK, Jason kick) – 39–28 SJ
- 11:50 SJ – GEATHERS, Jason 1 yd run (HAGLUND, A.J. kick) – 46–28 SJ
- 09:42 ARZ – JAMES, Jerrian 36 yd pass from SMOKER, Jeff (JONES, Brian rush) – 46–36 SJ
- 03:48 SJ – GEATHERS, Jason 1 yd run (HAGLUND, A.J. kick) – 53–36 SJ
- 01:18 ARZ – HARRIS, Atnaf 49 yd pass from SMOKER, Jeff (WITCZAK, Jason kick) – 53–43 SJ
- 00:41 SJ – HAGLUND, A.J. 17 yd field goal – 56–43 SJ
- 00:16 SJ – GLOVER, Phil 4 yd run (HAGLUND, A.J. kick) – 63–43 SJ
- Officials: Referee: Bill Athan; Umpire: Matt Jordan; Linesman: Kavin McGrath; Line judge: Rusty Baynes; Back judge: Greg Wilson
- Offensive Player of the Game: A.J. Haglund (SJ)
- Defensive Player of the Game: Clevan Thomas (SJ)
- Ironman Player of the Game: Cleannord Santil (SJ)

=== Week 4: vs. New York Dragons ===
| Quarter | 1 | 2 | 3 | 4 | Total |
|---|---|---|---|---|---|
| NY | 7 | 3 | 7 | 16 | 33 |
| ARZ | 14 | 21 | 13 | 14 | 62 |

at US Airways Center, Phoenix, Arizona

- Date: March 21
- Game time: 10:00 PM EST
- Game attendance: 11,689

Game information

1st Quarter:

- 08:40 ARZ – Trandon Harvey 6 yd pass from Jeff Smoker (Eric Houle kick) – 7–0 ARZ
- 07:50 NY – Levy Brown 52 yd kickoff return (Chris Onorato kick) – 7–7
- 03:45 ARZ – Jeff Smoker 2 yd run (Eric Houle kick) – 14–7 ARZ

2nd Quarter:

- 13:21 ARZ – Trandon Harvey 1 yd run (Eric Houle kick) – 21–7 ARZ
- 06:53 NY – Chris Onorato 30 yd field goal – 21–10 ARZ
- 01:44 ARZ – Wendall Gaines 1 yd pass from Jeff Smoker (Eric Houle kick) – 28–10 ARZ
- 00:15 ARZ – Trandon Harvey 45 yd pass from Jeff Smoker (Eric Houle kick) 35–10 ARZ

3rd Quarter:

- 10:36 ARZ – Trandon Harvey 12 yd pass from Jeff Smoker (Eric Houle kick) – 42–10 ARZ
- 04:59 NY – Kevin Swayne 19 yd pass from Rohan Davey (Chris Onorato kick) – 42–17 ARZ
- 01:52 ARZ – Kevin Nickerson 36 yd pass from Jeff Smoker (Eric Houle kick failed) – 48–17 ARZ

4th Quarter:

- 14:57 NY – Keron Henry 6 yd pass from Rohan Davey (Kevin Swayne pass from DAVEY) – 48–25 ARZ
- 10:39 ARZ – Isaiah Trufant 28 yd fumble recovery (Eric Houle kick) – 55–25 ARZ
- 04:37 NY – Henry Taylor safety – 55–27 ARZ
- 00:44 ARZ – Kevin Nickerson 14 yd run (Eric Houle kick) – 62–27 ARZ
- 00:00 NY – Chris Anthony 14 yd pass from Rohan Davey (Rohan Davey pass failed) – 62–33 ARZ
- Officials: Referee: CUTAIA, Dave; Umpire: GRANADO, Al; Linesman: MCCABE, Mike; Line judge: LUCKY, Art; Back judge: COLE, James
- Offensive Player of the Game: Jeff Smoker (ARZ)
- Defensive Player of the Game: Isaiah Trufant (ARZ)
- Ironman Player of the Game: Wendall Gaines (ARZ)

=== Week 5: at Chicago Rush ===
| Quarter | 1 | 2 | 3 | 4 | Total |
|---|---|---|---|---|---|
| ARZ | 7 | 7 | 7 | 14 | 35 |
| CHI | 14 | 14 | 7 | 24 | 59 |

at Allstate Arena, Rosemont, Illinois

- Date: March 28
- Game time: 8:30 PM EST
- Game attendance: 15,058

Game information

1st Quarter:

- 12:00 ARZ – Siaha Burley 3 yd pass from Jeff Smoker (Eric Houle kick) – 7–0 ARZ
- 08:18 CHI – DeJuan Alfonzo 2 yd run (Dan Frantz kick) – 7–7
- 02:54 CHI – Travis LaTendresse 14 yd pass from Sherdrick Bonner (Dan Frantz kick) – 14–7 CHI

2nd Quarter:

- 13:09 ARZ – Keyuo Craver 42 yd interception return (Eric Houle kick) – 14–14
- 08:42 CHI – Damian Harrell 15 yd pass from Sherdrick Bonner (Dan Frantz kick) – 21–14 CHI
- 05:19 CHI – Russ Michna 1 yd run (Dan Frantz kick) – 28–14 CHI

3rd Quarter:

- 07:52 ARZ – Siaha Burley 5 yd pass from Jeff Smoker (Eric Houle kick) – 28–21 CHI
- 05:14 CHI – Damian Harrell 45 yd pass from Sherdrick Bonner (Dan Frantz kick) – 35–21 CHI

4th Quarter:

- 13:29 CHI – Robert Boss 10 yd pass from Sherdrick Bonner (Dan Frantz kick) – 42–21 CHI
- 09:51 ARZ – Siaha Burley 9 yd pass from Jeff Smoker (Eric Houle kick) – 42–28 CHI
- 08:54 CHI – Dan Alexander 10 yd run (Dan Frantz kick) – 49–28 CHI
- 02:51 CHI – Damian Harrell 3 yd pass from Sherdrick Bonner (Dan Frantz kick) – 56–28 CHI
- 00:39 CHI – Dan Frantz 26 yd field goal – 59–28 CHI
- 00:07 ARZ – Siaha Burley 9 yd pass from Jeff Smoker (Eric Houle kick) – 59–35 CHI
- Officials: Referee: Perry Havener; Umpire: Tom Laverty; Linesman: Kavin McGrath; Line judge: David Meslow; Back judge: Keith Washington
- Offensive Player of the Game: Damian Harrell (CHI)
- Defensive Player of the Game: John Moyer (CHI)
- Ironman Player of the Game: DeJuan Alfonzo (CHI)

=== Week 6 ===
Bye Week

=== Week 7: at Tampa Bay Storm ===
| Quarter | 1 | 2 | 3 | 4 | Total |
|---|---|---|---|---|---|
| ARZ | 13 | 14 | 7 | 29 | 63 |
| TB | 14 | 21 | 13 | 14 | 62 |

at St. Pete Times Forum, Tampa, Florida

- Date: April 13
- Game time: 2:00 PM EST
- Game attendance: 16,413

Game information

1st Quarter:

- 11:00 ARZ – DEVOE, Todd 5 yd pass from CAMPBELL, Lang (HOULE, Eric kick) – 7–0 ARZ
- 09:33 TB – EDWARDS, Hank 35 yd pass from DIETZ, Brett (MARLER, Seth kick) – 7–7
- 04:35 ARZ – BURLEY, Siaha 27 yd pass from CAMPBELL, Lang (HOULE, Eric kick failed) – 13–7 ARZ
- 01:03 TB – DIETZ, Brett 3 yd run (MARLER, Seth kick) – 14–13 TB

2nd Quarter:

- 13:40 ARZ – BURLEY, Siaha 27 yd pass from CAMPBELL, Lang (ROBINSON, Chris rush) – 21–14 ARZ
- 09:55 TB – HOLMES, Brent 4 yd pass from DIETZ, Brett (MARLER, Seth kick) – 21–21
- 01:24 TB – MARSHALL, Torra 44 yd pass from DIETZ, Brett (MARLER, Seth kick) – 28–21 TB
- 00:38 ARZ – HARVEY, Trandon 5 yd pass from CAMPBELL, Lang (HOULE, Eric kick failed) – 28–27 TB
- 00:01 TB – SAMUELS, Lawren 5 yd pass from DIETZ, Brett (MARLER, Seth kick) – 35–27 TB

3rd Quarter:

- 11:02 TB – DIETZ, Brett 18 yd run (MARLER, Seth kick failed) – 41–27 TB
- 05:18 ARZ – HARVEY, Trandon 13 yd pass from CAMPBELL, Lang (HOULE, Eric kick) – 41–34 TB
- 01:26 TB – MARSHALL, Torra 1 yd run (MARLER, Seth kick) – 48–34 TB

4th Quarter:

- 14:52 ARZ – HARVEY, Trandon 20 yd pass from CAMPBELL, Lang (HOULE, Eric kick) – 48–41 TB
- 13:43 ARZ – FAOA, Asi 0 yd net recovery (HOULE, Eric kick) – 48–48
- 10:26 TB – EDWARDS, Hank 29 yd pass from DIETZ, Brett (MARLER, Seth kick) – 55–48 TB
- 03:00 ARZ – BURLEY, Siaha 4 yd pass from CAMPBELL, Lang (HOULE, Eric kick) – 55–55
- 00:29 TB – EDWARDS, Hank 19 yd pass from DIETZ, Brett (MARLER, Seth kick) – 62–55 TB
- 00:03 ARZ – BURLEY, Siaha 9 yd pass from CAMPBELL, Lang (GAINES, Wendall rush) – 63–62 ARZ
- Officials: Referee: Perry Havener; Umpire: Paul Frerking; Linesman: Kavin McGrath; Line judge: David Meslow; Back judge: Keith Washington
- Offensive Player of the Game: Brett Dietz (TB)
- Defensive Player of the Game: Kelvin Kinney (TB)
- Ironman Player of the Game: Torrance Marshall (TB)

=== Week 8: vs. New Orleans VooDoo ===
| Quarter | 1 | 2 | 3 | 4 | Total |
|---|---|---|---|---|---|
| NO | 17 | 19 | 14 | 10 | 60 |
| ARZ | 0 | 14 | 14 | 8 | 36 |

at US Airways Center, Phoenix, Arizona

- Date: April 18
- Game time: 10:00 PM EST
- Game attendance: 11,749

Game information

1st Quarter:

- 14:22 NO – James Jordan 23 yd pass from Danny Wimprine (Todd France kick) – 7–0 NO
- 10:25 NO – James Jordan 14 yd pass from Danny Wimprine (Todd France kick) – 14–0 NO
- 03:40 NO – Todd France 47 yd field goal – 17–0 NO

2nd Quarter:

- 14:54 ARZ – Trandon Harvey 25 yd pass from Lang Campbell (Eric Houle kick) – 17–7 NO
- 09:30 NO – James Jordan 12 yd pass from Danny Wimprine (Todd France kick failed) – 23–7 NO
- 03:56 NO – Isaiah Ross 9 yd pass from Danny Wimprine (Todd France kick failed) – 29–7 NO
- 02:51 ARZ – Trandon Harvey 42 yd kickoff return (Eric Houle kick) – 29–14 NO
- 00:42 NO – James Jordan 26 yd pass from Danny Wimprine (Todd France kick) – 36–14 NO

3rd Quarter:

- 13:56 NO – Norman LeJeune 18 yd interception return (Todd France kick) – 43–14 NO
- 06:43 ARZ – Siaha Burley 2 yd pass from Lang Campbell (Eric Houle kick) – 43–21 NO
- 03:44 NO – DeAndrew Rubin 36 yd pass from Danny Wimprine (Todd France kick) – 50–21 NO
- 00:57 ARZ – Trandon Harvey 23 yd pass from Lang Campbell (Eric Houle kick) – 50–28 NO

4th Quarter:

- 10:38 ARZ – Trandon Harvey 25 yd pass from Lang Campbell (Derrick White rush) – 50–36 NO
- 07:25 NO – Todd France 23 yd field goal – 53–36 NO
- 00:54 NO – James Lynch 2 yd run (Todd France kick) – 60–36 NO
- Officials: Referee: ATHAN, Bill; Umpire: JORDAN, Matt; Linesman: BAYNES, Allen; Line judge: BAYNES, Rusty; Back judge: WILSON, Greg
- Offensive Player of the Game: Danny Wimprine (NO)
- Defensive Player of the Game: Keon Raymond (NO)
- Ironman Player of the Game: Trandon Harvey (ARZ)

=== Week 9: vs. Georgia Force ===
| Quarter | 1 | 2 | 3 | 4 | Total |
|---|---|---|---|---|---|
| GA | 21 | 21 | 7 | 12 | 61 |
| ARZ | 21 | 21 | 14 | 10 | 66 |

at US Airways Center, Phoenix, Arizona

- Date: April 26
- Game time: 10:00 PM EST
- Game attendance: 10,444

Game information

1st Quarter:

- 14:24 ARZ – Trandon Harvey 31 yd pass from Lang Campbell (Eric Houle kick) – 7–0 ARZ
- 13:10 ARZ – Todd Devoe 7 yd pass from Lang Campbell (Eric Houle kick) – 14–0 ARZ
- 11:19 GA – Tiger Jones 27 yd pass from Chris Greisen (Carlos Martinez kick) – 14–7 ARZ
- 09:46 ARZ – Siaha Burley 25 yd pass from Lang Campbell (Eric Houle kick) – 21–7 ARZ
- 05:56 GA – Chris Greisen 1 yd run (Carlos Martinez kick) – 21–14 ARZ
- 04:45 GA – Carl Morris 0 yd net recovery (Carlos Martinez kick) – 21–21

2nd Quarter:

- 11:35 ARZ – Siaha Burley 4 yd pass from Lang Campbell (Eric Houle kick) – 28–21 ARZ
- 08:10 GA – Tiger Jones 25 yd pass from Chris Greisen (Carlos Martinez kick) – 28–28
- 07:18 ARZ – Trandon Harvey 58 yd kickoff return (Eric Houle kick) – 35–28 ARZ
- 05:37 GA – James Clark 16 yd pass from Chris Greisen (Carlos Martinez kick) – 35–35
- 00:31 GA – Tiger Jones 31 yd pass from Chris Greisen (Carlos Martinez kick) – 42–35 GA
- 00:19 ARA – Chris Robinson 1 yd run (Eric Houle kick) – 42–42

3rd Quarter:

- 12:35 GA – Tiger Jones 16 yd pass from Chris Greisen (Carlos Martinez kick) – 49–42 GA
- 07:19 ARZ – Trandon Harvey 8 yd pass from Lang Campbell (Eric Houle kick) – 49–49
- 02:54 ARZ – Chris Robinson 3 yd run (Eric Houle kick) – 56–49 ARZ

4th Quarter:

- 10:35 ARZ – Chris Robinson 1 yd run (Eric Houle kick) – 63–49 ARZ
- 06:47 GA – Damien Groce 6 yd pass from Chris Greisen (Carlos Martinez kick failed) – 63–55 ARZ
- 02:45 ARZ – Eric Houle 25 yd field goal – 66–55 ARZ
- 01:50 GA – Carl Morris 19 yd pass from Chris Greisen (Chris Greisen pass failed) – 66–61 ARZ
- Officials: Referee: GARVEY, Pat; Umpire: KING, Paul; Linesman: WARD, Bill; Line judge: MCELWEE, Bob; Back judge: DEBELL, James
- Offensive Player of the Game: Tiger Jones (GA)
- Defensive Player of the Game: Aric Williams (ARZ)
- Ironman Player of the Game: Trandon Harvey (ARZ)

=== Week 10: at Los Angeles Avengers ===
| Quarter | 1 | 2 | 3 | 4 | Total |
|---|---|---|---|---|---|
| ARZ | 14 | 24 | 7 | 14 | 59 |
| LA | 10 | 28 | 0 | 28 | 66 |

at Staples Center, Los Angeles, California

- Date: May 3
- Game time: 10:30 PM EST
- Game attendance: 13,511

Game information

1st Quarter:

- 09:31 LA – Tyler Fredrickson 18 yd field goal – 3–0 LA
- 08:06 ARZ – Todd Devoe 30 yd pass from Lang Campbell (Eric Houle kick) – 7–3 ARZ
- 04:29 LA – Kevin Ingram 20 yd pass from Tim Hicks (Tyler Fredrickson kick) – 10–7 LA
- 00:03 ARZ – Todd Devoe 6 yd pass from Lang Campbell (Eric Houle kick) – 14–10 ARZ

2nd Quarter:

- 12:25 LA – Kevin Ingram 23 yd pass from Tim Hicks (Tyler Fredrickson kick) – 17–14 LA
- 11:35 ARZ – Trandon Harvey 55 yd kickoff return (Eric Houle kick) – 21–17 LA
- 09:41 LA – Timon Marshall 33 yd pass from Tim Hicks (Tyler Fredrickson kick) – 24–21 LA
- 05:48 ARZ – Siaha Burley 29 yd pass from Lang Campbell (Eric Houle kick) – 28–24 ARZ
- 04:03 LA – LaShaun Ward 45 yd pass from Tim Hicks (Tyler Fredrickson kick) – 31–28 LA
- 02:23 ARZ – Trandon Harvey 41 yd pass from Lang Campbell (Eric Houle kick) – 35–31 ARZ
- 01:18 LA – LaShaun Ward 30 yd pass from Tim Hicks (Tyler Fredrickson kick) – 38–35 LA
- 00:00 ARZ – Eric Houle 28 yd field goal – 38–38

3rd Quarter:

- 03:21 ARZ – Siaha Burley 5 yd pass from Lang Campbell (Eric Houle kick) – 45–38 ARZ

4th Quarter:

- 14:56 LA – Josh Jeffries 1 yd run (Tyler Fredrickson kick) – 45–45
- 13:24 LA – Kevin Ingram 0 yd net recovery (Tyler Fredrickson kick) – 52–45 LA
- 09:20 ARZ – Trandon Harvey 5 yd pass from Lang Campbell (Eric Houle kick) – 52–52
- 05:23 LA – Josh Jeffries 1 yd run (Tyler Fredrickson kick) – 59–52 LA
- 01:16 ARZ – Siaha Burley 29 yd pass from Lang Campbell (Eric Houle kick) – 59–59
- 00:22 LA – Timon Marshall 9 yd pass from Tim Hicks (Tyler Fredrickson kick) – 66–59 LA
- Officials: Referee: Bill LeMonnier; Umpire: Jeff Carr; Linesman: Greg Shields; Line judge: Dave Chesney; Back judge: Billy Beckett
- Offensive Player of the Game: Timon Marshall (LA)
- Defensive Player of the Game: Terrell Maze (LA)
- Ironman Player of the Game: Josh Jefferies (LA)

=== Week 11: vs. San Jose SaberCats ===
| Quarter | 1 | 2 | 3 | 4 | Total |
|---|---|---|---|---|---|
| SJ | 7 | 21 | 14 | 21 | 63 |
| ARZ | 7 | 20 | 8 | 7 | 42 |

at US Airways Center, Phoenix, Arizona

- Date: May 9
- Game time: 10:00 PM EST
- Game attendance: 11,514

Game information

1st Quarter:

- 10:42 ARZ – SAUNDERS 9 yd pass from SMOKER (HOULE kick) – 7–0 ARZ
- 04:44 SJ – ROE 4 yd pass from GRIEB (HAGLUND kick) – 7–7

2nd Quarter:

- 12:59 ARZ – HOULE 35 yd field goal – 10–7 ARZ
- 10:11 SJ – SAINTIL 3 yd pass from GRIEB (HAGLUND kick) – 14–10 SJ
- 06:34 ARZ – HARVEY 16 yd pass from SMOKER (HOULE kick) – 17–14 ARZ
- 03:46 SJ – WRIGHT 3 yd pass from GRIEB (HAGLUND kick) – 21–17 SJ
- 00:40 ARZ – ROBINSON 4 yd run (HOULE kick) – 24–21 ARZ
- 00:11 SJ – ROE 1 yd pass from GRIEB (HAGLUND kick) – 28–24 SJ
- 00:00 ARZ – HOULE 43 yd field goal – 28–27 SJ

3rd Quarter:

- 09:59 SJ – WRIGHT 1 yd pass from GRIEB (HAGLUND kick) – 35–27 SJ
- 06:56 ARZ – BURLEY 10 yd pass from SMOKER (ROBINSON rush) – 35–35
- 05:46 SJ – WRIGHT 9 yd pass from GRIEB (HAGLUND kick) – 42–35 SJ

4th Quarter:

- 14:56 ARZ – BURLEY 14 yd pass from SMOKER (HOULE kick) – 42–42
- 13:46 SJ – WRIGHT 31 yd pass from GRIEB (HAGLUND kick) – 49–42 SJ
- 09:36 SJ – ROE 6 yd pass from GRIEB (HAGLUND kick) – 56–42 SJ
- 00:50 SJ – JOHNSON 6 yd run (HAGLUND kick) – 63–42 SJ
- Officials: Referee: HAVENER, Perry; Umpire: LAVERTY, Tom; Linesman: MCGRATH, Kavin; Line judge: MESLOW, Devid; Back judge: WASHINGTON, Kei
- Offensive Player of the Game: Mark Grieb (SJ)
- Defensive Player of the Game: Marquis Floyd (SJ)
- Ironman Player of the Game: Jerrian James (ARZ)

=== Week 12: at Dallas Desperados ===
| Quarter | 1 | 2 | 3 | 4 | Total |
|---|---|---|---|---|---|
| ARZ | 0 | 15 | 13 | 27 | 55 |
| DAL | 7 | 7 | 21 | 19 | 54 |

at American Airlines Center, Dallas, Texas

- Date: May 17
- Game time: 8:00 PM EST
- Game attendance: 12,950
  - Officials: Referee: Dave Lambros; Umpire: Doug Wilson; Linesman: Kavin McGrath; Line judge: Brian Matthew; Back judge: Rich Wilborn
  - Offensive Player of the Game: Trandon Harvey (ARZ)
  - Defensive Player of the Game: Colston Weatherington (DAL)
  - Ironman Player of the Game: Trandon Harvey (ARZ)

Game information
1st Quarter:
- 14:54 DAL – BUSH, Josh 56 yd kickoff return (HAMILTON, Remy kick) – 7–0 DAL

2nd Quarter:

- 09:01 ARZ – HARVEY, Trandon 3 yd pass from SMOKER, Jeff (HOULE, Eric kick) – 7–7
- 05:41 DAL – THURMAN, Andrae 24 yd pass from DOLEZEL, Clint (HAMILTON, Remy kick) – 14–7 DAL
- 00:00 ARZ – HARVEY, Trandon −4 yd missed FG return (ROBINSON, Chris rush) – 15–14 ARZ

3rd Quarter:

- 11:23 ARZ – HARVEY, Trandon 22 yd pass from SMOKER, Jeff (HOULE, Eric kick failed) – 21–14 ARZ
- 09:42 DAL – BUSH, Josh 26 yd pass from DOLEZEL, Clint (HAMILTON, Remy kick) – 21–21
- 08:23 ARZ – BURLEY, Siaha 43 yd pass from SMOKER, Jeff (HOULE, Eric kick) 28–21 ARZ
- 05:58 DAL – THURMAN, Andrae 28 yd pass from DOLEZEL, Clint (HAMILTON, Remy kick) – 28–28
- 01:44 DAL – DOLEZEL, Clint 2 yd run (HAMILTON, Remy kick) – 35–28 DAL

4th Quarter:

- 12:28 ARZ – DEVOE, Todd 5 yd pass from SMOKER, Jeff (HOULE, Eric kick) – 35–35
- 08:39 DAL – WHITE, Josh 12 yd run (HAMILTON, Remy kick) – 42–35 ARZ
- 05:12 ARZ – HARVEY, Trandon 17 yd pass from SMOKER, Jeff (HOULE, Eric kick) – 42–42
- 03:57 DAL – ARMSTRONG, Anth 48 yd pass from DOLEZEL, Clint (HAMILTON, Remy kick failed) – 48–42 DAL
- 00:31 ARZ – BURLEY, Siaha 27 yd pass from SMOKER, Jeff (HOULE, Eric kick) – 49–48 ARZ
- 00:18 DAL – ARMSTRONG, Anth 41 yd pass from DOLEZEL, Clint (DOLEZEL, Clint pass failed) – 54–49 DAL
- 00:00 ARZ – DEVOE, Todd 16 yd pass from SMOKER, Jeff (SMOKER, Jeff pass failed) – 55–54 ARZ

=== Week 13: vs. Grand Rapids Rampage ===
| Quarter | 1 | 2 | 3 | 4 | Total |
|---|---|---|---|---|---|
| GR | 7 | 21 | 14 | 6 | 48 |
| ARZ | 14 | 21 | 0 | 17 | 52 |

at US Airways Center, Phoenix, Arizona

- Date: May 24
- Game time: 10:00 PM EST
- Game attendance: 12,559

Game information

1st Quarter:

- 09:09 ARZ – ROBINSON 1 yd run (HOULE kick) – 7–0 ARZ
- 07:52 GR – JOHNSON 25 yd pass from MACPHERSON (GOWINS kick) – 7–7
- 01:41 ARZ – ROBINSON 2 yd run (HOULE kick) – 14–7 ARZ

2nd Quarter:

- 14:55 GR – HIGGINS 17 yd pass from MACPHERSON (GOWINS kick) – 14–14
- 10:05 ARZ – HARVEY 1 yd run (HOULE kick) – 21–14 ARZ
- 05:17 GR – JOHNSON 31 yd pass from MACPHERSON (GOWINS kick) – 21–21
- 00:47 ARZ – ROBINSON 1 yd run (HOULE kick) – 28–21 ARZ
- 00:28 GR – JOHNSON 45 yd pass from MACPHERSON (GOWINS kick) 28–28
- 00:00 ARZ – BURLEY 11 yd pass from SMOKER (HOULE kick) – 35–28 ARZ

3rd Quarter:

- 10:52 GR – JOHNSON 20 yd pass from MACPHERSON (GOWINS kick) – 35–35
- 03:52 GR – HIGGINS 1 yd run (GOWINS kick) – 42–35 GR

4th Quarter:

- 13:28 ARZ – HARVEY 29 yd pass from SMOKER (HOULE kick) – 42–42
- 07:11 ARZ – HOULE 25 yd field goal – 45–42 ARZ
- 06:07 GR – SEWELL 34 yd pass from MACPHERSON (GOWINS kick failed) – 48–45 GR
- 00:35 ARZ – SMOKER 1 yd run (HOULE kick) – 52–48 ARZ
- Officials: Referee: LEMONNIER, Bill; Umpire: CARR, Jeff; Linesman: SHIELDS, Greg; Line judge: CHESNEY, Dave; Back judge: BECKETT, Billy
- Offensive Player of the Game: Jeff Smoker (ARZ)
- Defensive Player of the Game: Chris Mckenzie (ARZ)
- Ironman Player of the Game: Marvin Brown (ARZ)

=== Week 14: at Orlando Predators ===
| Quarter | 1 | 2 | 3 | 4 | Total |
|---|---|---|---|---|---|
| ARZ | 7 | 22 | 14 | 17 | 60 |
| ORL | 6 | 7 | 16 | 24 | 53 |

at Amway Arena, Orlando, Florida

- Date: May 31
- Game time: 7:30 PM EST
- Game attendance: 12,821

Game information

1st Quarter:

- 08:17 ORL – RUBIN, DeAndrew 25 yd pass from EATON, Jake (FRANCE, Todd kick blocked) – 6–0 ORL
- 04:15 ARZ – SAUK, Matt 1 yd run (HOULE, Eric kick) – 7–6 ARZ

2nd Quarter:

- 14:49 ARZ – GAINES, Wendall 3 yd pass from SAUK, Matt (HOULE, Eric kick) – 14–6 ARZ
- 03:41 ARZ – DEVOE, Todd 7 yd pass from SAUK, Matt (HOULE, Eric kick blocked) – 20–6 ARZ
- 00:51 ORL – RUBIN, DeAndrew 13 yd pass from STAFFORD, Shane (FRANCE, Todd kick) – 20–13 ARZ
- 00:33 ARZ – BURLEY, Siaha 6 yd pass from SAUK, Matt (HOULE, Eric kick) – 27–13 ARZ
- 00:24 ARZ – BARNO, Dustin safety – 29–13 ARZ

3rd Quarter:

- 12:19 ARZ – BURLEY, Siaha 11 yd pass from SAUK, Matt (HOULE, Eric kick) – 36–13 ARZ
- 06:40 ORL – TOLIVER, T.T. 13 yd pass from STAFFORD, Shane (STAFFORD, Shane rush) – 36–21 ARZ
- 05:23 ARZ – DEVOE, Todd 40 yd pass from SAUK, Matt (HOULE, Eric kick) – 43–21 ARZ
- 00:12 ORL – TOLIVER, T.T. 8 yd pass from STAFFORD, Shane (MOYE-MOORE, M. pass from STAFFORD, Shane) – 43–29 ARZ

4th Quarter:

- 12:16 ARZ – INGRAM, J. 16 yd run (HOULE, Eric kick) – 50–29 ARZ
- 08:28 ORL – ARMSTRONG, Odie 6 yd pass from STAFFORD, Shane (MOYE-MOORE, M. rush) – 50–37 ARZ
- 05:16 ARZ – HOULE, Eric 23 yd field goal – 53–37 ARZ
- 03:46 ORL – THOMAS, Levon 34 yd pass from STAFFORD, Shane (MOYE-MOORE, M. rush) – 53–45 ARZ
- 00:44 ORL – NICKERSON, K. 11 yd pass from STAFFORD, Shane (NICKERSON, K. rush) – 53–53
- 00:05 ARZ – BURLEY, Siaha 19 yd pass from SAUK, Matt (HOULE, Eric kick) – 60–53 ARZ
- Officials: Referee: Bill McCabe; Umpire: Mike Delaney; Linesman: Shawn Hochuli; Line judge: Dirk Bell; Back judge: Jimmy Buchanon
- Offensive Player of the Game: Matt Sauk (ARZ)
- Defensive Player of the Game: Isaiah Trufant (ARZ)
- Ironman Player of the Game: Trandon Harvey (ARZ)

=== Week 15: at Kansas City Brigade ===
| Quarter | 1 | 2 | 3 | 4 | Total |
|---|---|---|---|---|---|
| ARZ | 13 | 36 | 14 | 10 | 73 |
| KC | 14 | 6 | 0 | 14 | 34 |

at Sprint Center, Kansas City, Missouri

- Date: June 8
- Game time: 2:00 PM EST
- Game attendance: 12,210

Game information

1st Quarter:

- 10:56 ARZ – HARVEY 7 yd pass from SAUK (HOULE kick failed) – 6–0 ARZ
- 06:36 KC – HORACEK 26 yd pass from Q. CARTER (MARTINEZ kick) – 7–6 KC
- 02:43 ARZ – BURLEY 11 yd pass from SAUK (HOULE kick) – 13–7 ARZ
- 00:13 KC – MYERS 12 yd pass from Q. CARTER (MARTINEZ kick) – 14–13 KC

2nd Quarter:

- 12:32 ARZ – HARVEY 15 yd pass from SAUK (ROBINSON rush) – 21–14 ARZ
- 07:42 ARZ – HARVEY 33 yd pass from SAUK (HOULE kick failed) – 27–14 ARZ
- 06:31 ARZ – JOSEPH 15 yd interception return (HOULE kick) – 34–14 ARZ
- 02:57 KC – MANNING 28 yd pass from Q. CARTER (MARTINEZ kick failed) – 34–20 ARZ
- 00:56 ARZ – INGRAM 2 yd run (HOULE kick) – 41–20 ARZ
- 00:06 ARZ – GAINES 2 yd pass from SAUK (ROBINSON rush) – 49–20 ARZ

3rd Quarter:

- 10:37 ARZ – BURLEY 4 yd pass from SAUK (HOULE kick) – 56–20 ARZ
- 03:22 ARZ – BURLEY 13 yd pass from SAUK (HOULE kick) – 63–20 ARZ

4th Quarter:

- 09:11 KC – MANNING 9 yd pass from Q. CARTER (FREDERICK pass from Q. CARTER) – 63–28 ARZ
- 08:07 ARZ – MCKENZIE 10 yd kickoff return (HOULE kick) – 70–28 ARZ
- 01:42 ARZ – HOULE 34 yd field goal – 73–28 ARZ
- 00:21 KC – MOSS 1 yd run (Q. CARTER pass failed) – 73–34 ARZ
- Officials: Referee: Bill Athan; Umpire: Paul Frerking; Linesman: Kavin McGrath; Line judge: Rusty Baynes; Back judge: Greg Wilson
- Offensive Player of the Game: Siaha Burley (ARZ)
- Defensive Player of the Game: Isaiah Trufant (ARZ)
- Ironman Player of the Game: Chris McKenzie (ARZ)

=== Week 16: vs. Colorado Crush ===
| Quarter | 1 | 2 | 3 | 4 | Total |
|---|---|---|---|---|---|
| COL | 28 | 14 | 7 | 13 | 62 |
| ARZ | 7 | 13 | 8 | 27 | 55 |

at US Airways Center, Phoenix, Arizona

- Date: June 16
- Game time: 10:00 PM EST
- Game attendance: 11,608

Game information

1st Quarter:

- 13:51 COL – NELSON 6 yd pass from DUTTON (YAUSSI kick) – 7–0 COL
- 10:13 COL – DUTTON 5 yd run (YAUSSI kick) – 14–0 COL
- 07:08 ARZ – BURLEY 11 yd pass from SAUK (HOULE kick) – 14–7 COL
- 03:04 COL – QUINNIE 20 yd pass from DUTTON (YAUSSI kick) – 21–7 COL
- 01:41 COL – QUINNIE 8 yd pass from DUTTON (YAUSSI kick) – 28–7 COL

2nd Quarter:

- 14:55 COL – HARMON 17 yd fumble recovery (YAUSSI kick) – 35–7 COL
- 10:31 ARZ – BURLEY 7 yd pass from SAUK (ROBINSON rush failed) – 35–13 COL
- 00:38 ARZ – DEVOE 10 yd pass from SAUK (HOULE kick) – 35–20 COL
- 00:15 COL – NELSON 20 yd pass from DUTTON (YAUSSI kick) – 42–20 COL

3rd Quarter:

- 10:33 ARZ – HARVEY 10 yd pass from SAUK (SMOKER rush) – 42–28 COL
- 05:20 COL – HOSACK 5 yd pass from DUTTON (YAUSSI kick) – 49–28 COL

4th Quarter:

- 11:03 ARZ – HARVEY 9 yd pass from SAUK (HOULE kick) – 49–35 COL
- 07:53 COL – QUINNIE 10 yd pass from DUTTON (YAUSSI kick failed) – 55–35 COL
- 05:05 COL – FLOYD 38 yd interception return (YAUSSI kick) – 62–35 COL
- 00:51 ARZ – BURLEY 7 yd pass from SAUK (HOULE kick) – 62–42 COL
- 00:36 ARZ – GAINES 1 yd pass from SAUK (GAINES rush failed) – 62–48 COL
- 00:20 ARZ – BURLEY 3 yd pass from SAUK (HOULE kick) – 62–55 COL
- Officials: Referee: JOHNSON, Riley; Umpire: LOWE, Rick; Linesman: MAPP, Julian; Line judge: DETILLIER, RG; Back judge: MCCLESKY, Bud
- Offensive Player of the Game: John Dutton (COL)
- Defensive Player of the Game: Rashad Floyd (COL)
- Ironman Player of the Game: Aaron McConnell (COL)

=== Week 17: vs. Utah Blaze ===
| Quarter | 1 | 2 | 3 | 4 | Total |
|---|---|---|---|---|---|
| UTA | 14 | 24 | 0 | 0 | 38 |
| ARZ | 0 | 13 | 19 | 0 | 32 |

at US Airways Center, Phoenix, Arizona

- Date: June 21
- Game time: 10:00 PM EST
- Game attendance: 13,542

Game information

1st Quarter:

- 13:31 UTA – Huey Whittaker 20 yd pass from Joe Germaine (Steve Videtich kick) – 7–0 UTA
- 07:00 UTA – JJ McKelvey 18 yd pass from Joe Germaine (Steve Videtich kick) – 14–0 UTA

2nd Quarter:

- 14:20 UTA – JJ McKelvey 22 yd pass from Joe Germaine (Steve Videtich kick) – 21–0 UTA
- 08:49 UTA – Steve Videtich 19 yd field goal – 24–0 UTA
- 07:07 ARZ – Siaha Burley 37 yd pass from Jeff Smoker (Eric Houle kick) – 24–7 UTA
- 01:40 ARZ – Chris Robinson 1 yd run (Eric Houle kick failed) – 24–13 UTA
- 00:52 UTA – Aaron Boone 9 yd pass from Joe Germaine (Steve Videtich kick) – 31–13 UTA
- 00:01 UTA – Aaron Boone 19 yd pass from Joe Germaine (Steve Videtich kick) – 38–13 UTA

3rd Quarter:

- 11:17 ARZ – Chris Robinson 1 yd run (Eric Houle kick failed) – 38–19 ARZ
- 06:16 ARZ – Trandon Harvey 31 yd pass from Jeff Smoker (Chris Robinson rush failed) – 38–25 ARZ
- 01:22 ARZ – Trandon Harvey 30 yd pass from Jeff Smoker (Eric Houle kick) – 38–32 ARZ

4th Quarter:

- No Scoring
- Officials: Referee: LAMBROS, Dave; Umpire: WILSON, Doug; Linesman: SAALFELD, Kelly; Line judge: MATTHEW, Brian; Back judge: WILBORN, Rich
- Offensive Player of the Game: N/A
- Defensive Player of the Game: N/A
- Ironman Player of the Game: N/A

== Playoffs ==
=== American Conference Wild Card: vs. (6) Grand Rapids Rampage ===
| Quarter | 1 | 2 | 3 | 4 | Total |
|---|---|---|---|---|---|
| (6) GR | 10 | 17 | 14 | 7 | 48 |
| (3) ARZ | 0 | 20 | 14 | 7 | 41 |

at US Airways Center, Phoenix, Arizona

- Date: June 30
- Game time: 9:30 PM EST
- Game attendance: 10,862

Game information

1st Quarter:

- 09:04 GR – WATKINS 4 yd pass from MACPHERSON (GOWINS kick) – 7–0 GR
- 01:15 GR – GOWINS 22 yd field goal – 10–0 GR

2nd Quarter:

- 13:47 ARZ – BURLEY 13 yd pass from SMOKER (HOULE kick failed) – 10–6 GR
- 11:52 GR – HIGGINS 44 yd pass from MACPHERSON (GOWINS kick) – 17–6 GR
- 09:45 ARZ – HARVEY 10 yd pass from SMOKER (HOULE kick) – 17–13 GR
- 05:32 GR – MAGNER 13 yd pass from MACPHERSON (GOWINS kick) – 24–13 GR
- 04:35 ARZ – HARVEY 56 yd kickoff return (HOULE kick) – 24–20 GR
- 00:00 GR – GOWINS 19 yd field goal – 27–20 GR

3rd Quarter:

- 12:15 ARZ – BURLEY 11 yd pass from SMOKER (HOULE kick) – 27–27
- 06:38 GR – MAGNER 5 yd pass from MACPHERSON (GOWINS kick) – 34–27 GR
- 04:39 ARZ – HARVEY 36 yd pass from SMOKER (HOULE kick) – 34–34
- 01:27 GR – MACPHERSON 1 yd run (GOWINS kick) – 41–34 GR

4th Quarter:

- 09:45 ARZ – SMOKER 1 yd run (HOULE kick) – 41–41
- 06:26 GR – HIGGINS 28 yd pass from MACPHERSON (GOWINS kick) – 48–41 GR
- Officials: Referee: MCCABE, Tom; Umpire: FRITZ, Wes; Linesman: SHIELDS, Greg; Line judge: BAYNES, Rusty; Back judge: BECKETT, Billy
- Offensive Player of the Game: Kenny Higgins (GR)
- Defensive Player of the Game: William Haith (GR)
- Ironman Player of the Game: Trandon Harvey (ARZ)
