= 2008 Los Angeles Avengers season =

Arena Football League team season

- Head coach: Ed Hodgkiss
- Home stadium: Staples Center

Results
- Record: 5–11
- Division place: 4th
- Playoffs: Did not qualify

The 2008 Los Angeles Avengers season was the ninth and final season for the franchise. The Avengers finished the season with a 5–11 record, and failed to make the playoffs. Two days after the final regular season game, head coach Ed Hodgkiss and two assistants were fired from the team. Also, the team folded 10 months later.

== Standings ==
Western Division
Team	W	L	PCT	PF	PA	DIV	CONF	Home	Away
San Jose SaberCats^{(2)}	11	5	.688	945	875	6–0	9–1	6–2	5–3
Arizona Rattlers^{(3)}	8	8	.500	842	907	1–5	3–7	3–5	5–3
Utah Blaze^{(4)}	6	10	.375	941	959	2–4	6–4	4–4	2–6
Los Angeles Avengers	5	11	.313	847	1004	3–3	4–6	4–4	1–7

== Regular season schedule ==
Week	Date	Opponent	Result	Record	Location	Attendance	Recap
1	February 29	New Orleans VooDoo	W 59–42	1–0	Staples Center	13,209	Recap
2	March 10	at Arizona Rattlers	W 65–33	2–0	US Airways Center	11,532	Recap
3	March 15	at Georgia Force	L 34–58	2–1	The Arena at Gwinnett Center	10,156	Recap
4	March 20	Philadelphia Soul	L 34–71	2–2	Staples Center	13,398	Recap
5	March 30	at Grand Rapids Rampage	L 59–84	2–3	Van Andel Arena	5,818	Recap
6	April 4	at Colorado Crush	L 54–67	2–4	Pepsi Center	11,159	Recap
7	April 12	Utah Blaze	W 79–62	3–4	Staples Center	14,861	Recap
8	April 19	Cleveland Gladiators	L 69–83	3–5	Staples Center	13,863	Recap
9	April 26	at San Jose SaberCats	L 42–70	3–6	HP Pavilion	13,083	Recap
10	May 3	Arizona Rattlers	W 66–59	4–6	Staples Center	13,511	Recap
11	May 10	New York Dragons	L 48–52	4–7	Staples Center	13,422	Recap
12	May 19	at Chicago Rush	L 28–72	4–8	Allstate Arena	15,904	Recap
13	Bye Week						
14	May 31	San Jose SaberCats	L 56–66	4–9	Staples Center	15,174	Recap
15	June 9	at Utah Blaze	L 56–65	4–10	EnergySolutions Arena	16,054	Recap
16	June 14	Kansas City Brigade	W 51–48	5–10	Staples Center	11,282	Recap
17	June 21	at Tampa Bay Storm	L 47–72	5–11	St. Pete Times Forum	17,891	Recap

== Staff ==
2008 Los Angeles Avengers staff
Front office: CEO / majority owner – Casey Wasserman; President – Matt Wikstrom; Senior Director of Ticket Sales & Service – James Jackson; Director of Marketing & Operations – Chris Holmes; Director of group sales – Jennifer Schwarzbach; Director of corporate partnerships – Evan Shapiro; Director of corporate partnerships – Ted Yeschin; Corporate partnerships executive – Eva Stefanac	Head coach: Head coach – Pat O'Hara; Offensive coaches: Quarterbacks / wide receivers coach – Chad Salisbury; Offensive line / fullback coach – Mark Tucker; Defensive coaches: Defensive coordinator / defensive backs coach – Maurice Blanding; Defensive line / linebackers coach – Leroy Thompson

== Roster ==
2008 Los Angeles Avengers roster
Quarterbacks: 15 Sonny Cumbie; 16 Tim Hicks; 10 Jeff Smith; Fullbacks: 35 Michael Cobbins; Wide receivers: 5 Kevin Ingram; 7 Timon Marshall; -- Terrence Stubbs; 81 J. R. Tolver; 8 LaShaun Ward	Offensive linemen: 65 Monreko Crittenden; 74 Sean McNamara; 66 Nick Mihlhauser; Defensive linemen: -- Justin Hickman; 58 Josh Jeffries; 86 LaKendrick Jones; 90 Ryan Riddle; 99 Jason Stewart	Linebackers: 25 Lonnie Ford; Defensive backs: -- Clarence Lawson; 1 Terrell Maze; 22 David Richardson; 29 Kabote Sikyala; 2 Damen Wheeler; Kickers: 13 Tyler Fredrickson	Injured reserve: -- Branden Hall OL; 18 Jarrett Hicks WR; -- Arnold Parker DB; Other league exempt: -- Sam Keller QB; Practice squad: -- Andy Collins QB; -- Matt McGhghy OL; -- Rob McMackin OL; rookies in italics Roster updated June 25, 2008; 24 Active, 4 Inactive, 3 PS

== Regular season ==
=== Week 1: vs. New Orleans VooDoo ===
Quarter	1	2	3	4	Total
NO	16	17	3	6	42
LA	7	21	14	17	59

at Staples Center, Los Angeles, California

- Date: February 29
- Game time: 10:30 PM EST
- Game attendance: 13,209

Game information

1st Quarter:

- 14:48 NO – Wendall Williams 54 yard Kickoff return (Jonathan Ruffin kick failed) – 6–0 NO
- 08:12 NO – Zach Hilton 5 yard pass from Steve Bellisari (Jonathan Ruffin kick) – 13–0 NO
- 05:07 LA – Timon Marshall 8 yard pass from Sonny Cumbie (David Davis kick) – 13–7 NO
- 00:18 NO – Jonathan Ruffin 20 yard field goal – 16–7 NO

2nd Quarter:

- 11:51 LA – Jarrett Hicks 4 yard pass from Sonny Cumbie (David Davis kick) – 16–14 NO
- 10:12 NO – Wendall Williams 34 yard pass from Steve Bellisari (Jonathan Ruffin kick) – 23–14 NO
- 06:39 LA – Lashaun Ward 33 yard pass from Sonny Cumbie (David Davis kick) – 23–21 NO
- 05:22 LA – Damen Wheeler 15 yard fumble return (David Davis kick) – 28–23 LA
- 02:31 NO – B.J. Barre 15 yard pass from Steve Bellisari (Jonathan Ruffin kick) – 30–28 NO
- 00:00 NO – Jonathan Ruffin 23 yard field goal – 33–28 NO

3rd Quarter:

- 13:57 LA – Timon Marshall 41 yard pass from Sonny Cumbie (David Davis kick) – 35–33 LA
- 08:15 NO – Jonathan Ruffin 22 yard field goal – 36–35 NO
- 05:39 LA – Kevin Ingram 18 yard pass from Sonny Cumbie (David Davis kick) – 42–36 LA

4th Quarter:

- 12:56 LA – David Davis 24 yard field goal – 45–36 LA
- 09:07 LA – Timon Marshall 14 yard pass from Sonny Cumbie (David Davis kick) – 52–36 LA
- 02:40 LA – Lashaun Ward 6 yard pass from Sonny Cumbie (David Davis kick) – 59–36 LA
- 00:48 NO – B.J. Barre 9 yard pass from Danny Wimprine (Jonathan Ruffin kick failed) – 59–42 LA
- Officials: Referee: Bill Athan; Umpire: Matt Jordan; Linesman: Allen Baynes; Line judge: Rusty Baynes; Back judge: Greg Wilson
- Player of the Game: Timon Marshall (LA)

=== Week 2: at Arizona Rattlers ===
Quarter	1	2	3	4	Total
LA	14	21	10	20	65
ARZ	7	14	0	12	33

at US Airways Center, Phoenix, Arizona

- Date: March 10
- Game time: 11:00 PM EST
- Game attendance: 11532

Game information

1st Quarter:

- 10:35 LA – MARSHALL, Timon 47 yd pass from CUMBIE, Sonny (DAVIS, David kick) – 7–0 LA
- 05:53 ARZ – BURLEY, Siaha 15 yd pass from CAMPBELL, Lang (WITCZAK, Jason kick) – 7–7
- 01:21 LA – INGRAM, Kevin 28 yd pass from CUMBIE, Sonny (DAVIS, David kick) – 14–7 LA

2nd Quarter:

- 12:11 ARZ – CAMPBELL, Lang 6 yd run (WITCZAK, Jason kick failed) – 14–13 LA
- 07:33 LA – WARD, LaShaun 30 yd pass from CUMBIE, Sonny (DAVIS, David kick) – 21–13 LA
- 03:51 LA – FORD, Lonnie 2 yd pass from CUMBIE, Sonny (DAVIS, David kick) – 28–13 LA
- 00:56 ARZ – BURLEY, Siaha 27 yd pass from SMOKER, Jeff (ROBINSON; Chris rush) – 28–21 LA
- 00:28 LA – WARD, LaShaun 32 yd pass from CUMBIE, Sonny (DAVIS, David kick) – 35–21 LA

3rd Quarter:

- 05:51 LA – DAVIS, David 26 yd field goal – 38–21 LA
- 00:16 LA – INGRAM, Kevin 10 yd pass from CUMBIE, Sonny (DAVIS, David kick) – 42–21 LA

4th Quarter:

- 13:13 LA – JEFFERIES, Josh 20 yd fumble recovery (DAVIS, David kick failed) – 51–21 LA
- 09:57 ARZ – FAOA, Asi 1 yd run (WITCZAK, Jason rush fumbld) – 51–27 LA
- 06:33 LA – MARSHALL, Timon 20 yd pass from CUMBIE, Sonny (DAVIS, David kick) – 58–27 LA
- 04:29 ARZ – BURLEY, Siaha 3 yd pass from SMOKER, Jeff (SMOKER, Jeff pass failed) – 58–33 LA
- 00:45 LA – FORD, Lonnie 1 yd run (DAVIS, David kick) – 65–33 LA
- Officials: Referee: MCCABE, Bill; Umpire: DELANEY, Mike; Linesman: HOCHULI, Shawn; Line judge: BELL, Dirk; Back judge: BUCHANAN, Jimmy
- Offensive Player of the Game: Sonny Cumbie (LA)
- Defensive Player of the Game: Wendall Gaines (ARZ)
- Ironman Player of the Game: Timon Marshall (LA)

=== Week 3: at Georgia Force ===
Quarter	1	2	3	4	Total
LA	0	7	14	13	34
GA	6	16	20	16	58

at The Arena at Gwinnett Center, Duluth, Georgia

- Date: March 15
- Game time: 7:00 PM EST
- Game attendance: 10156

Game information

1st Quarter:

- 10:08 GA – MARSHALL, Willi 1 yd run (MARTINEZ, Carlo kick failed) – 6–0 GA

2nd Quarter:

- 14:50 LA – INGRAM, Kevin 14 yd pass from CUMBIE, Sonny (DAVIS, David kick) – 7–6 LA
- 13:06 GA – PAULEY, Charles 43 yd pass from GREISEN, Chris (MARTINEZ, Carlo kick failed) – 12–7 GA
- 07:35 GA – BERGERON, Troy 43 yd pass from GREISEN, Chris (MARTINEZ, Carlo kick) – 19–7 GA
- 00:00 GA – MARTINEZ, Carlo 19 yd field goal – 22–7 GA

3rd Quarter:

- 14:23 LA – MARSHALL, Timon 43 yd pass from CUMBIE, Sonny (DAVIS, David kick) – 22–14 GA
- 11:36 GA – PAULEY, Charles 26 yd pass from GREISEN, Chris (MARTINEZ, Carlo kick) 29–14 GA
- 08:22 LA – MARSHALL, Timon 40 yd pass from CUMBIE, Sonny (DAVIS, David kick) – 29–21 GA
- 05:53 GA – BERGERON, Troy 43 yd pass from GREISEN, Chris (MARTINEZ, Carlo kick blocked) – 35–21 GA
- 01:30 GA – CLARK, James 4 yd pass from GREISEN, Chris (MARTINEZ, Carlo kick) – 42–21 GA

4th Quarter:

- 09:41 LA – INGRAM, Kevin 10 yd pass from CUMBIE, Sonny (DAVIS, David kick failed) – 42–27 GA
- 08:45 GA – MORRIS, Carl 11 yd pass from GREISEN, Chris (MARTINEZ, Carlo kick) – 49–27 GA
- 05:32 LA – HICKS, Jarrett 8 yd pass from CUMBIE, Sonny (DAVIS, David kick) – 49–34 GA
- 02:42 GA – BERGERON, Troy 18 yd pass from GREISEN, Chris (MARTINEZ, Carlo kick) – 56–34 GA
- 01:00 GA – JOHNSON, Eric safety – 58–34 GA
- Officials: Referee: Riley Johnson; Umpire: Rick Lowe; Linesman: Julian Mapp; Line judge: RG Detillier; Back judge: Bud McCleskey
- Offensive Player of the Game: PAULEY, Charles (GA)
- Defensive Player of the Game: NEWTON, Cam (GA)
- Ironman Player of the Game: MORRIS, Carl (GA)

=== Week 4: vs. Philadelphia Soul ===
Quarter	1	2	3	4	Total
PHI	13	21	14	23	71
LA	7	20	7	0	34

at Staples Center, Los Angeles, California

- Date: March 20
- Game time: 10:30 PM EST
- Game attendance: 13,398

Game information

1st Quarter:

- 12:01 PHI – JACKSON, Chris 23 yd pass from D'ORAZIO, Matt (HUGHES, Conner kick) – 7–0 PHI
- 07:05 LA – FORD, Lonnie 1 yd run (DAVIS, David kick) – 7–7
- 00:53 PHI – JACKSON, Chris 22 yd pass from D'ORAZIO, Matt (HUGHES, Conner kick failed) – 13–7 PHI

2nd Quarter:

- 13:24 LA – INGRAM, Kevin 6 yd pass from CUMBIE, Sonny (DAVIS, David kick failed) – 13–13
- 10:35 PHI – JACKSON, Chris 28 yd pass from D'ORAZIO, Matt (HUGHES, Conner kick) – 20–13 PHI
- 05:19 LA – INGRAM, Kevin 4 yd pass from CUMBIE, Sonny (DAVIS, David kick) – 20–20
- 02:34 PHI – JACKSON, Chris 5 yd pass from D'ORAZIO, Matt (HUGHES, Conner kick) – 27–20 PHI
- 00:43 LA – WARD, LaShaun 10 yd pass from CUMBIE, Sonny (DAVIS, David kick) – 27–27
- 00:03 PHI – BRACKINS, Larry 24 yd pass from D'ORAZIO, Matt (HUGHES, Conner kick) – 34–27 PHI

3rd Quarter:

- 07:21 LA – FORD, Lonnie 1 yd run (DAVIS, David kick) – 34–34
- 05:50 PHI – DELL, Clif 6 yd pass from D'ORAZIO, Matt (HUGHES, Conner kick) – 41–34 PHI
- 03:41 PHI – NYENHUIS, Gabe 0 yd fumble recovery (HUGHES, Conner kick) – 48–34 PHI

4th Quarter:

- 08:34 PHI – SAVE, Bryan safety – 50–34 PHI
- 06:31 PHI – JACKSON, Chris 15 yd pass from D'ORAZIO, Matt (HUGHES, Conner kick) – 57–34 PHI
- 02:14 PHI – JACKSON, Chris 30 yd pass from D'ORAZIO, Matt (HUGHES, Conner kick) 64–34 PHI
- 00:50 PHI – SAVE, Bryan 5 yd fumble recovery (HUGHES, Conner kick) – 71–34 PHI
- Officials: Referee: Perry Havener; Umpire: Tom Laverty; Linesman: Kavin McGrath; Line judge: David Meslow; Back judge: Keith Washington
- Offensive Player of the Game: Chris Jackson (PHI)
- Defensive Player of the Game: Gabe Nyenhuhis (PHI)
- Ironman Player of the Game: Mike Brown (PHI)

=== Week 5: at Grand Rapids Rampage ===
Quarter	1	2	3	4	Total
LA	14	16	8	21	59
GR	28	28	14	14	84

at Van Andel Arena, Grand Rapids, Michigan

- Date: March 30
- Game time: 2:00 PM EST
- Game attendance: 5,818

Game information

1st Quarter:

- 14:48 GRA – MARTIN 55 yd kickoff return (GOWINS kick) – 7–0 GR
- 13:18 GR – JOHNSON 25 yd pass from MACPHERSON (GOWINS kick) – 14–0 GR
- 09:56 GR – BELL 1 yd run (GOWINS kick) – 21–0 GR
- 05:45 LA – TOLVER 5 yd pass from CUMBIE (DAVIS kick) – 21–7 GR
- 01:34 LA – HARRELL 6 yd pass from CUMBIE (DAVIS kick) – 21–14 GR
- 00:47 GR – MARTIN 54 yd kickoff return (GOWINS kick) – 28–14 GR

2nd Quarter:

- 14:10 LA – INGRAM 30 yd pass from CUMBIE (DAVIS kick) – 28–21 GR
- 11:30 GR – JOHNSON 17 yd pass from MACPHERSON (GOWINS kick) – 35–21 GR
- 07:40 GR – BELL 2 yd run (GOWINS kick) – 42–21 GR
- 03:50 GR – HIGGINS 8 yd pass from MACPHERSON (GOWINS kick) 49–21 GR
- 00:59 LA – INGRAM 4 yd pass from CUMBIE (DAVIS kick failed) – 49–27 GR
- 00:24 GR – HIGGINS 3 yd pass from MACPHERSON (GOWINS kick) – 56–27 GR
- 00:00 LA – DAVIS 38 yd field goal – 56–30 GR

3rd Quarter:

- 11:45 LA – WARD 19 yd pass from CUMBIE (FORD rush) – 56–38 GR
- 06:28 GR – MCPHERSON 2 yd run (GOWINS kick) – 63–38 GR
- 00:44 GR – HIGGINS 19 yd pass from MACPHERSON (GOWINS kick) 70–38 GR

4th Quarter:

- 14:23 GR – JOHNSON 1 yd fumble recovery (GOWINS kick) – 77–38 GR
- 10:02 LA – TOLVER 16 yd pass from T. HICKS (DAVIS kick) – 77–45 GR
- 09:16 GR – MARTIN 57 yd kickoff return (GOWINS kick) – 84–45 GR
- 04:28 LA – INGRAM 14 yd pass from T. HICKS (DAVIS kick) – 84–52 GR
- 00:21 LA – INGRAM 8 yd pass from T. HICKS (DAVIS kick) – 84–59 GR
- Officials: Referee: Dennis Lipski; Umpire: Paul Frerking; Linesman: Brent Durbin; Line judge: Darrel Leftwich; Back judge: Reggie Smith
- Offensive Player of the Game: Chris Martin (GR)
- Defensive Player of the Game: James Macpherson (GR)
- Ironman Player of the Game: Ahmad Hawkins (GR)

=== Week 6: at Colorado Crush ===
Quarter	1	2	3	4	Total
LA	20	14	7	13	54
COL	14	14	20	19	67

at Pepsi Center, Denver, Colorado

- Date: April 4
- Game time: 9:00 PM EST
- Game attendance: 11,159

Game information

1st Quarter:

- 14:55 LA – PARKER 2 yd net recovery (DAVIS kick failed) – 6–0 LA
- 08:59 COL – THOMAS 2 yd run (RUSH kick) – 7–6 COL
- 07:19 LA – WARD 25 yd pass from T. HICKS (DAVIS kick) – 13–7 LA
- 05:48 COL – QUINNIE 9 yd pass from DUTTON (RUSH kick) – 14–13 COL
- 02:58 LA – INGRAM 28 yd pass from T. HICKS (DAVIS kick) – 20–14 LA

2nd Quarter:

- 13:29 COL – PYATT 5 yd pass from DUTTON (RUSH kick) – 21–20 COL
- 09:07 LA – INGRAM 9 yd pass from T. HICKS (DAVIS kick) – 27–21 LA
- 00:31 LA – INGRAM 44 yd pass from T. HICKS (DAVIS kick) – 34–21 LA
- 00:11 COL – NELSON 4 yd pass from DUTTON (RUSH kick) – 34–28 LA

3rd Quarter:

- 10:52 COL – NELSON 37 yd pass from DUTTON (RUSH kick) – 35–34 COL
- 05:22 COL – NELSON 5 yd pass from DUTTON (RUSH kick failed) – 41–34 COL
- 03:07 LA – MARSHALL 45 yd pass from T. HICKS (DAVIS kick) – 41–41
- 01:36 COL – NELSON 37 yd pass from DUTTON (RUSH kick) – 48–41 COL

4th Quarter:

- 10:39 COL – WATTON 6 yd pass from DUTTON (RUSH kick) – 55–41 COL
- 08:23 COL – DUTTON 4 yd run (RUSH kick failed) – 61–41 COL
- 05:58 LA – FORD 1 yd run (DAVIS kick failed) – 61–47 COL
- 03:05 LA – HICKMAN 50 yd interception return (DAVIS kick) – 61–54 COL
- 01:24 COL – NELSON 9 yd pass from DUTTON (RUSH kick failed) – 67–54 COL
- Officials: Referee: Tom McCabe; Umpire: Rick Podraza; Linesman: Rod Pearson; Line judge: Dana McKenzie; Back judge: Scott Helverson
- Offensive Player of the Game: N/A
- Defensive Player of the Game: N/A
- Ironman Player of the Game: N/A

=== Week 7: vs. Utah Blaze ===
Quarter	1	2	3	4	Total
UTA	21	13	7	21	62
LA	23	21	28	7	79

at Staples Center, Los Angeles, California

- Date: April 12
- Game time: 10:30 PM EST
- Game attendance: 14,861

Game information

1st Quarter:

- 13:58 LA – LaShaun Ward 43 yd pass from Tim Hicks (David Davis kick) – 7–0 LA
- 10:50 UTA – J.J. McKelvey 17 yd pass from Joe Germaine (Steve Azar kick) – 7–7
- 07:13 LA – Kevin Ingram 12 yd pass from Tim Hicks (David Davis kick failed) – 13–7 LA
- 05:57 UTA – Huey Whittaker 16 yd pass from Joe Germaine (Steve Azar kick) – 14–13 UTA
- 03:00 LA – David Davis 29 yd field goal – 16–14 LA
- 01:03 UTA – Devin Wyman 19 yd pass from Joe Germaine (Steve Azar kick) – 21–16 UTA
- 00:15 LA – Timon Marshall 57 yd kickoff return (David Davis kick) – 23–21 LA

2nd Quarter:

- 11:39 UTA – Aaron Boone 10 yd pass from Joe Germaine (Steve Azar kick failed) – 27–23 UTA
- 04:47 LA – J.R. Tolver 10 yd pass from Tim Hicks (David Davis kick) – 30–27 LA
- 02:20 UTA – J.J. McKelvey 40 yd pass from Joe Germaine (Steve Azar kick) – 34–30 UTA
- 00:45 LA – LaShaun Ward 23 yd pass from Tim Hicks (David Davis kick) – 37–34 LA
- 00:00 LA – Josh Jeffries 3 yd net recovery (David Davis kick) – 44–34 LA

3rd Quarter:

- 12:17 LA – Clay Harrell 5 yd pass from Tim Hicks (David Davis kick) – 51–34 LA
- 10:22 UTA – J.J. McKelvey 0 yd fumble recovery (Steve Azar kick) – 51–41 LA
- 09:06 LA – LaShaun Ward 45 yd pass from Tim Hicks (David Davis kick) – 58–41 LA
- 05:02 LA – LaShaun Ward 26 yd pass from Tim Hicks (David Davis kick) – 65–41 LA
- 00:37 LA – Lonnie Ford 1 yd run (David Davis kick) – 72–41 LA

4th Quarter:

- 11:53 UTA – J.J. McKelvey 16 yd pass from Joe Germaine (Steve Azar kick) – 72–48 LA
- 07:39 UTA – Aaron Boone 8 yd pass from Joe Germaine (Steve Azar kick) – 72–55 LA
- 04:35 LA – Timon Marshall 24 yd pass from Tim Hicks (David Davis kick) – 79–55 LA
- 01:13 UTA – J.J. McKelvey 14 yd pass from Joe Germaine (Steve Azar kick) – 79–62 LA
- Officials: Referee: Dave Cutaia; Umpire: Al Granado; Linesman: Mike McCabe; Line judge: Art Lucky; Back judge: James Cole
- Offensive Player of the Game: Tim Hicks (LA)
- Defensive Player of the Game: Damon Wheeler (LA)
- Ironman Player of the Game: Josh Jeffries (LA)

=== Week 8: vs. Cleveland Gladiators ===
Quarter	1	2	3	4	Total
CLE	27	14	14	28	83
LA	13	21	14	21	69

at Staples Center, Los Angeles, California

- Date: April 19
- Game time: 10:30 PM EST
- Game attendance: 13,863

Game information

1st Quarter:

- 13:55 CLE – Jackson 26 yd pass from Philyaw (Ball Kick) – 7–0 CLE
- 11:07 LA – Perkins 2 yd pass from Hicks (Pat Failed) – 7–6 LA
- 9:13 CLE – Jackson 39 yd pass from Philyaw (Pat Failed) – 13–6 LA
- 8:01 LA – Marshall 37 yd pass from Hicks (Davis Kick) – 13–13
- 4:15 CLE – Jackson 1 yd run (Ball Kick) – 20–13 CLE
- 3:31 CLE – Amey 9 yd pass from Philyaw (Ball Kick) – 27–13 CLE

2nd Quarter:

- 9:12 LA- Tolver 19 yd pass from Hicks (Davis Kick) – 27–20 LA
- 2:59 LA – Hicks 7 yd run (Davis Kick) – 27–27
- 1:20 CLE – Amey 13 yd pass from Philyaw (Ball Kick) – 34–27 CLE
- 0:41 LA – Ward 5 yd pass from Hicks (Davis Kick) – 34–34 LA
- 0:12 CLE – Amey 4 yd pass from Philyaw (Ball Kick) – 41–34 CLE

3rd Quarter:

- 11:14 LA – Tolver 6 yd pass from Hicks (Davis Kick)- 41–41
- 9:13 CLE – Jackson 1 yd run (Ball Kick) – 48–41 CLE
- 8:11 CLE – Jackson 1 yd run (Ball Kick) – 55–41 CLE
- 3:19 LA – Tolver 10 yd pass from Hicks (Davis Kick) – 55–48 CLE

4th Quarter:

- 10:53 LA – Harrell 6 yd pass from Hicks (Davis Kick) – 55–55
- 8:37 CLE – Amey 30 yd pass from Philyaw (Ball Kick) – 62–55 CLE
- 7:31 LA – Ward 20 yd pass from Hicks (Davis Kick) – 62–62 LA
- 5:15 CLE – Marshall 22 yd pass from Hicks (Ball Kick) – 69–62 CLE
- 1:54 CLE – Amey 9 yd pass from Philyaw (Ball Kick) – 76–62 CLE
- 0:37 LA – Tolver 4 yd pass from Hicks (Ball Kick) – 76–69 LA
- 0:19 CLE – Amey 8 yd pass from Philyaw (Ball Kick) – 83–69 CLE
- Officials: Referee: Bill McCabe; Umpire: Wes Fritz; Linesman: Neil Brunner; Line judge: Paul Engleberts; Back judge: Tony Lombardo
- Offensive Player of the Game: Otis Amey (CLE)
- Defensive Player of the Game: Brandon Hefflin (CLE)
- Ironman Player of the Game: N/A

=== Week 9: at San Jose SaberCats ===
Quarter	1	2	3	4	Total
LA	14	9	13	6	42
SJ	20	19	10	21	70

at HP Pavilion at San Jose, San Jose, California

- Date: April 26
- Game time: 10:30 PM EST
- Game attendance: 13,083

Game information

1st Quarter:

- 12:08 SJ – SAINTIL, Cleann 15 yd pass from GRIEB, Mark (HAGLUND, A.J. kick) – 7–0 SJ
- 08:29 LA – HARRELL, Clay 11 yd pass from HICKS, Tim (FREDRICKSON, Ty kick) – 7–7
- 03:09 SJ – WRIGHT, Rodney 9 yd pass from GRIEB, Mark (HAGLUND, A.J. kick blocked) – 13–7 SJ
- 01:45 SJ – SAINTIL, Cleann 14 yd pass from GRIEB, Mark (HAGLUND, A.J. kick) – 20–7 SJ
- 00:32 LA – MARSHALL, Timon 43 yd pass from HICKS, Tim (FREDRICKSON, Ty kick) – 20–14 SJ

2nd Quarter:

- 11:59 SJ – ROE, James 9 yd pass from GRIEB, Mark (HAGLUND, A.J. kick) – 27–14 SJ
- 07:03 SJ – HAGLUND, A.J. 35 yd field goal – 30–14 SJ
- 03:55 SJ – SAINTIL, Cleann 14 yd pass from GRIEB, Mark (HAGLUND, A.J. kick blocked) – 36–14 SJ
- 03:55 LA – WHEELER, Damen PAT return – 36–16 SJ
- 00:29 LA – FORD. Lonnie 3 yd run (FREDRICKSON, Ty kick) – 36–23 SJ
- 00:00 SJ – HAGLUND, A.J. 35 yd field goal – 39–23 SJ

3rd Quarter:

- 11:42 LA – WARD, LaShaun 13 yd pass from HICKS, Tim (FREDRICKSON, Ty rush failed) – 39–29 SJ
- 11:03 SJ – WRIGHT, Rodney 56 yd kickoff return (HAGLUND, A.J. kick) – 46–29 SJ
- 03:00 SJ – HAGLUND, A.J. 18 yd field goal – 49–29 SJ
- 00:37 LA – MARSHALL, Timon 24 yd pass from HICKS, Tim (FREDRICKSON, Ty kick) – 49–36 SJ

4th Quarter:

- 14:53 SJ – WRIGHT, Rodney 21 yd pass from GRIEB, Mark (HAGLUND, A.J. kick) – 56–36 SJ
- 11:09 SJ – ROE, James 7 yd pass from GRIEB, Mark (HAGLUND, A.J. kick) – 63–36 SJ
- 06:24 SJ – THOMAS, Clevan 48 yd interception return (HAGLUND, A.J. kick) – 70–36 SJ
- 02:46 LA – WARD, LaShaun 32 yd pass from CUMBIE, Sonny (FREDRICKSON, Ty kick failed) – 70–42 SJ
- Officials: Referee: Riley Johnson; Umpire: Rick Podraza; Linesman: Julian Mapp; Line judge: R.G. Detiller; Back judge: Bud McCleskey
- Offensive Player of the Game: Mark Grieb (SJ)
- Defensive Player of the Game: Omarr Smith (SJ)
- Ironman Player of the Game: Rodney Wright (SJ)

=== Week 10: vs. Arizona Rattlers ===
Quarter	1	2	3	4	Total
ARZ	14	24	7	14	59
LA	10	28	0	28	66

at Staples Center, Los Angeles, California

- Date: May 3
- Game time: 10:30 PM EST
- Game attendance: 13,511

Game information

1st Quarter:

- 09:31 LA – Tyler Fredrickson 18 yd field goal – 3–0 LA
- 08:06 ARZ – Todd Devoe 30 yd pass from Lang Campbell (Eric Houle kick) – 7–3 ARZ
- 04:29 LA – Kevin Ingram 20 yd pass from Tim Hicks (Tyler Fredrickson kick) – 10–7 LA
- 00:03 ARZ – Todd Devoe 6 yd pass from Lang Campbell (Eric Houle kick) – 14–10 ARZ

2nd Quarter:

- 12:25 LA – Kevin Ingram 23 yd pass from Tim Hicks (Tyler Fredrickson kick) – 17–14 LA
- 11:35 ARZ – Trandon Harvey 55 yd kickoff return (Eric Houle kick) – 21–17 LA
- 09:41 LA – Timon Marshall 33 yd pass from Tim Hicks (Tyler Fredrickson kick) – 24–21 LA
- 05:48 ARZ – Siaha Burley 29 yd pass from Lang Campbell (Eric Houle kick) – 28–24 ARZ
- 04:03 LA – LaShaun Ward 45 yd pass from Tim Hicks (Tyler Fredrickson kick) – 31–28 LA
- 02:23 ARZ – Trandon Harvey 41 yd pass from Lang Campbell (Eric Houle kick) – 35–31 ARZ
- 01:18 LA – LaShaun Ward 30 yd pass from Tim Hicks (Tyler Fredrickson kick) – 38–35 LA
- 00:00 ARZ – Eric Houle 28 yd field goal – 38–38

3rd Quarter:

- 03:21 ARZ – Siaha Burley 5 yd pass from Lang Campbell (Eric Houle kick) – 45–38 ARZ

4th Quarter:

- 14:56 LA – Josh Jeffries 1 yd run (Tyler Fredrickson kick) – 45–45
- 13:24 LA – Kevin Ingram 0 yd net recovery (Tyler Fredrickson kick) – 52–45 LA
- 09:20 ARZ – Trandon Harvey 5 yd pass from Lang Campbell (Eric Houle kick) – 52–52
- 05:23 LA – Josh Jeffries 1 yd run (Tyler Fredrickson kick) – 59–52 LA
- 01:16 ARZ – Siaha Burley 29 yd pass from Lang Campbell (Eric Houle kick) – 59–59
- 00:22 LA – Timon Marshall 9 yd pass from Tim Hicks (Tyler Fredrickson kick) – 66–59 LA
- Officials: Referee: Bill LeMonnier; Umpire: Jeff Carr; Linesman: Greg Shields; Line judge: Dave Chesney; Back judge: Billy Beckett
- Offensive Player of the Game: Timon Marshall (LA)
- Defensive Player of the Game: Terrell Maze (LA)
- Ironman Player of the Game: Josh Jefferies (LA)

=== Week 11: vs. New York Dragons ===
Quarter	1	2	3	4	Total
NY	13	14	7	18	52
LA	0	13	28	7	48

at Staples Center, Los Angeles, California

- Date: May 10
- Game time: 10:30 PM EST
- Game attendance: 13,422

Game information

1st Quarter:

- 13:19 NY – Billy Parker 20 yd interception return (Chris Onorato kick failed) – 6–0 NY
- 04:23 NY – Kevin Swayne 2 yd pass from Aaron Garcia (Chris Onorato kick) – 13–0 NY

2nd Quarter:

- 14:07 NY – Farouk Adelekan 34 yd missed FG return (Chris Onorato kick) – 20–0 NY
- 06:39 LA – Kevin Ingram 2 yd pass from Tim Hicks (Tyler Fredrickson kick failed) – 20–6 NY
- 02:09 NY – Jason Willis 9 yd pass from Aaron Garcia (Chris Onorato kick) – 27–6 NY
- 00:21 LA – LaShaun Ward 11 yd pass from Sonny Cumbie (Tyler Fredrickson kick) – 27–13 NY

3rd Quarter:

- 09:12 LA – Ryan Riddle 35 yd fumble recovery (Tyler Fredrickson kick) – 27–20 NY
- 06:50 NY – Jason Willis 23 yd pass from Aaron Garcia (Chris Onorato kick) – 34–20 NY
- 05:18 LA – LaShaun Ward 15 yd pass from Sonny Cumbie (Tyler Fredrickson kick) – 34–27 NY
- 03:46 LA – Kevin Ingram 16 yd pass from Sonny Cumbie (Tyler Fredrickson kick) – 34–34
- 00:29 LA – Michael Cobbins 2 yd run (Tyler Fredrickson kick) – 41–34 LA

4th Quarter:

- 14:27 NY – Jason Willis 35 yd pass from Aaron Garcia (Chris Onorato kick blocked) – 41–40 LA
- 10:25 LA – LaShaun Ward 4 yd run (Tyler Fredrickson kick) – 48–40 LA
- 08:01 NY – Kevin Swayne 7 yd pass from Aaron Garcia (Chris Onorato kick failed) – 48–46 LA
- 03:09 NY – Jason Willis 4 yd pass from Aaron Garcia (Aaron Garcia pass failed)- 52–48 NY
- Officials: Referee: Bill McCabe; Umpire: Mike Delaney; Linesman: Shawn Hochuli; Line judge: Dirk Bell; Back judge: Jimmy Buchanan
- Offensive Player of the Game: Jason Willis (NY)
- Defensive Player of the Game: Farouk Adeleken (NY)
- Ironman Player of the Game: Kevin Ingram (LA)

=== Week 12: at Chicago Rush ===
Quarter	1	2	3	4	Total
LA	7	7	7	7	28
CHI	20	24	14	14	72

at Allstate Arena, Rosemont, Illinois

- Date: May 19
- Game time: 8:00 PM EST
- Game attendance: 15,904

Game information

1st Quarter:

- 13:16 CHI – ALEXANDER 13 yd run (FRANTZ kick) – 7–0 CHI
- 11:03 CHI – ALEXANDER 14 yd pass from MICHNA (FRANTZ kick) – 14–0 CHI
- 03:54 LA – JEFFRIES 2 yd run (FREDRICKSON kick) – 14–7 CHI
- 00:00 CHI – MORGAN 22 yd pass from MICHNA (FRANTZ kick blocked) – 20–7 CHI

2nd Quarter:

- 08:39 LA – PERKINS 1 yd pass from T. HICKS (FREDRICKSON kick) – 20–14 CHI
- 04:00 CHI – ALEXANDER 1 yd run (FRANTZ kick) – 27–14 CHI
- 02:49 CHI – TEAM safety – 29–14 CHI
- 02:16 CHI – LATENDRESSE 21 yd pass from MICHNA (FRANTZ kick failed) – 35–14 CHI
- 00:43 CHI – PETERS safety – 37–14 CHI
- 00:02 CHI – LATENDRESSE 11 yd pass from MICHNA (FRANTZ kick) – 44–14 CHI

3rd Quarter:

- 13:15 LA – INGRAM 0 yd fumble recovery (FREDRICKSON kick) – 44–21 CHI
- 09:15 CHI – HARRELL 4 yd pass from MICHNA (FRANTZ kick) – 51–21 CHI
- 02:20 CHI – LATENDRESSE 27 yd pass from MICHNA (FRANTZ kick) – 58–21 CHI

4th Quarter:

- 13:33 LA – WARD 9 yd pass from CUMBIE (FREDRICKSON kick) – 58–28 CHI
- 09:07 CHI – UNERTL 47 yd interception return (FRANTZ kick) – 65–28 CHI
- 05:53 CHI – ROBINSON 26 yd interception return (FRANTZ kick) – 72–28 CHI
- Officials: Referee: Dennis Lipski; Umpire: Rick Nelson; Linesman: Brent Durbin; Line judge: Darrel Leftwich; Back judge: Reggie Smith
- Offensive Player of the Game: N/A
- Defensive Player of the Game: N/A
- Ironman Player of the Game: N/A

=== Week 13 ===
Bye Week

=== Week 14: vs. San Jose SaberCats ===
Quarter	1	2	3	4	Total
SJ	14	10	14	28	66
LA	0	14	14	28	56

at Staples Center, Los Angeles, California

- Date: May 31
- Game time: 10:30 PM EST
- Game attendance: 15,174

Game information

1st Quarter:

- 11:08 SJ – James Roe 3 yd pass from Mark Grieb (A.J. Haglund kick) – 7–0 SJ
- 00:01 SJ – Rodney Wright 1 yd pass from Mark Grieb (A.J. Haglund kick) – 14–0 SJ

2nd Quarter:

- 09:49 LA – Michael Cobbins 1 yd run (Tyler Fredrickson kick) – 14–7 SJ
- 08:37 SJ – Cleannord Saintil 28 yd pass from Mark Grieb (A.J. Haglund kick) – 21–7 SJ
- 06:47 LA – LaShaun Ward 19 yd pass from Sonny Cumbie (Tyler Fredrickson kick) – 21–14 SJ
- 00:00 SJ – A.J. Haglund 34 yd field goal – 24–14 SJ

3rd Quarter:

- 11:51 LA – Timon Marshall 28 yd run (Tyler Fredrickson kick) – 24–21 SJ
- 08:49 SJ – Rodney Wright 10 yd pass from Mark Grieb (A.J. Haglund kick) – 31–21 SJ
- 07:31 LA – LaShaun Ward 35 yd pass from Sonny Cumbie (Tyler Fredrickson kick) – 31–28 SJ
- 03:46 SJ – Rodney Wright 6 yd pass from Mark Grieb (A.J. Haglund kick) – 38–28 SJ

4th Quarter:

- 14:56 LA – J.R. Tolver 2 yd run (Tyler Fredrickson kick) – 38–35 SJ
- 13:30 SJ – James Roe 6 yd pass from Mark Grieb (A.J. Haglund kick) – 45–35 SJ
- 05:46 SJ – Julius Gant 24 yd pass from Mark Grieb (A.J. Haglund kick) – 52–35 SJ
- 02:15 LA – Timon Marshall 13 yd pass from Sonny Cumbie (Tyler Fredrickson kick) – 52–42 SJ
- 01:07 SJ – Brian Johnson 1 yd run (A.J. Haglund kick) – 59–42 SJ
- 00:47 LA – Timon Marshall 16 yd pass from Sonny Cumbie (Tyler Fredrickson kick) – 59–49 SJ
- 00:20 SJ – Brian Johnson 6 yd run (A.J. Haglund kick) – 66–49 SJ
- 00:06 LA – LaShaun Ward 26 yd pass from Sonny Cumbie (Tyler Fredrickson kick) – 66–56 SJ
- Officials: Referee: Pat Garvey; Umpire: Paul King; Linesman: Bill Ward; Line judge: Bob McElwee; Back judge: James DeBell
- Offensive Player of the Game: Mark Grieb (SJ)
- Defensive Player of the Game: Ron Jones (SJ)
- Ironman Player of the Game: Jason Geathers (SJ)

=== Week 15: at Utah Blaze ===
Quarter	1	2	3	4	Total
LA	14	16	14	12	56
UTA	14	14	17	20	65

at EnergySolutions Arena, Salt Lake City, Utah

- Date: June 9
- Game time: 10:00 PM EST
- Game attendance: 16,054

Game information

1st Quarter:

- 10:54 LA – WARD 8 yd pass from CUMBIE (FREDRICKSON kick) – 7–0 LA
- 09:03 UTA – WHITTAKER 15 yd pass from GERMAINE (VIDETICH kick) – 7–7
- 03:22 LA – INGRAM 8 yd pass from CUMBIE (FREDRICKSON kick) – 14–7 LA
- 01:21 UTA – CULP 24 yd pass from GERMAINE (VIDETICH kick) – 14–14

2nd Quarter:

- 14:54 LA – WARD 37 yd pass from CUMBIE (FREDRICKSON kick failed) – 20–14 LA
- 09:52 UTA – FILER 3 yd run (VIDETICH kick) – 21–20 UTA
- 04:08 LA – FREDRICKSON 29 yd field goal – 23–21 LA
- 00:58 LA – COBBINS 1 yd run (FREDRICKSON kick) – 30–21 LA
- 00:12 UTA – WHITTAKER 12 yd pass from GERMAINE (VIDETICH kick) – 30–28 LA

3rd Quarter:

- 13:57 LA – MAZE 8 yd interception return (FREDRICKSON kick) – 37–28 LA
- 12:04 UTA – BOONE 45 yd pass from GERMAINE (VIDETICH kick) – 37–35 LA
- 09:05 UTA – FILER 2 yd run (VIDETICH kick) – 42–37 LA
- 06:16 LA – COBBINS 1 yd run (FREDRICKSON kick) – 44–42 LA
- 03:11 UTA – VIDETICH 28 yd field goal – 45–44 UTA

4th Quarter:

- 13:12 LA – JEFFRIES 3 yd run (COBBINS rush failed) – 50–45 LA
- 06:46 UTA – WHITTAKER 5 yd pass from GERMAINE (GERMAINE rush failed) – 51–50 UTA
- 02:33 UTA – MCKELVEY 28 yd pass from GERMAINE (VIDETICH kick) – 58–50 UTA
- 00:24 UTA – MORRIS 14 yd fumble recovery (VIDETICH kick) – 65–50 UTA
- 00:00 LA – INGRAM 12 yd pass from CUMBIE (FREDRICKSON kick failed) – 65–56 UTA
- Officials: Referee: Bill LeMonnier; Umpire: Mike Delaney; Linesman: Greg Shields; Line judge: Dave Chesney; Back judge: Billy Beckett
- Offensive Player of the Game: Huey Whittaker (UTA)
- Defensive Player of the Game: Kelvin Morris (UTA)
- Ironman Player of the Game: Rodney Filer (UTA)

=== Week 16: vs. Kansas City Brigade ===
Quarter	1	2	3	4	Total
KC	7	24	7	10	48
LA	10	10	14	17	51

at Staples Center, Los Angeles, California

- Date: June 14
- Game time: 6:30 PM EST
- Game attendance: 11,282

Game information

1st Quarter:

- 09:58 LA – Kevin Ingram 6 yd pass from Sonny Cumbie (Tyler Fredrickson kick) – 7–0 LA
- 08:18 KC – Quincy Carter 1 yd run (Peter Martinez kick) – 7–7
- 03:34 LA – Tyler Fredrickson 39 yd field goal – 10–7 LA

2nd Quarter:

- 14:56 KC – Charles Frederick 14 yd pass from Quincy Carter (Peter Martinez kick) – 14–10 KC
- 12:44 LA – LaShaun Ward 7 yd pass from Sonny Cumbie (Tyler Fredrickson kick) – 17–14 LA
- 07:34 KC – Dawan Moss 4 yd run (Peter Martinez kick) – 21–17 KC
- 00:57 KC – Peter Martinez 26 yd field goal – 24–17 KC
- 00:28 LA – Tyler Fredrickson 33 yd field goal – 24–20 KC
- 00:10 KC – Jerel Myers 23 yd pass from Quincy Carter (Peter Martinez kick) – 31–20 KC

3rd Quarter:

- 09:09 LA – Timon Marshall 27 yd pass from Sonny Cumbie (Tyler Fredrickson kick) – 31–27 KC
- 04:50 KC – Mike Horacek 28 yd pass from Quincy Carter (Peter Martinez kick) – 38–27 KC
- 01:30 LA – LaShaun Ward 3 yd run (Tyler Fredrickson kick) – 38–34 KC

4th Quarter:

- 14:08 LA – Brandon Perkins safety – 38–36 KC
- 12:59 LA – Kevin Ingram 15 yd pass from Sonny Cumbie (Tyler Fredrickson kick) – 43–38 LA
- 09:56 KC – Peter Martinez 26 yd field goal – 43–41 LA
- 07:01 KC – Mike Horacek 14 yd pass from Quincy Carter (Peter Martinez kick) – 48–23 LA
- 00:34 LA – Timon Marshall 3 yd run (Kevin Ingram pass from CUMBIE, Sonny) – 51–48 LA
- Officials: Referee: Dennis Lipski; Umpire: Rick Nelson; Linesman: Brent Durbin; Line judge: Derrel Leftwich; Back judge: Reggie Smith
- Offensive Player of the Game: Timon Marshall (LA)
- Defensive Player of the Game: Brandon Perkins (LA)
- Ironman Player of the Game: Kevin Ingram (LA)

=== Week 17: at Tampa Bay Storm ===
Quarter	1	2	3	4	Total
LA	0	20	13	14	47
TB	20	21	21	10	72

at St. Pete Times Forum, Tampa, Florida

- Date: June 21
- Game time: 7:30 PM EST
- Game attendance: 17,981

Game information

1st Quarter:

- 11:06 TB – ROBINSON, Sedri 6 yd run (MARLER, Seth kick failed) – 6–0 TB
- 02:07 TB – EDWARDS, Hank 23 yd pass from DIETZ, Brett (MARLER, Seth kick) – 13–0 TB
- 00:06 TB – GLOVER, Phil 1 yd run (MARLER, Seth kick) – 20–0 TB

2nd Quarter:

- 13:07 LA – MARSHALL, Timon 22 yd pass from CUMBIE, Sonny (FREDRICKSON, Ty kick) – 20–7 TB
- 08:13 TB – EDWARDS, Hank 10 yd pass from DIETZ, Brett (MARLER, Seth kick) – 27–7 TB
- 07:00 LA – TOLVER, J.R. 37 yd pass from CUMBIE, Sonny (FREDRICKSON, Ty kick) – 27–14 TB
- 04:34 TB – TIMMONS, Tyrone 21 yd pass from DIETZ, Brett (MARLER, Seth kick) – 34–14 TB
- 02:12 LA – STUBBS, Terranc 13 yd pass from CUMBIE, Sonny (FREDRICKSON, Ty kick failed) – 34–20 TB
- 00:07 TB – SAMUELS, Lawren 7 yd pass from DIETZ, Brett (MARLER, Seth kick) – 41–20 TB

3rd Quarter:

- 11:44 TB – SAMUELS, Lawren 5 yd pass from DIETZ, Brett (MARLER, Seth kick) – 48–20 TB
- 06:45 LA – TOLVER, J.R. 4 yd pass from CUMBIE, Sonny (FREDRICKSON, Ty kick) – 48–27 TB
- 03:08 TB – GLOVER, Phil 1 yd run (MARLER, Seth kick) – 55–27 TB
- 01:55 TB – GLOVER, Phil 1 yd run (MARLER, Seth kick) – 62–27 TB
- 00:18 LA – MARSHALL, Timon 37 yd pass from CUMBIE, Sonny (FREDRICKSON, Ty kick failed) – 62–33 TB

4th Quarter:

- 10:43 TB – TIMMONS, Tyrone 27 yd pass from DIETZ, Brett (MARLER, Seth kick) – 69–33 TB
- 08:27 LA – MARSHALL, Timon 9 yd pass from CUMBIE, Sonny (FREDRICKSON, Ty kick) – 69–40 TB
- 00:54 TB – MARLER, Seth 27 yd field goal – 72–40 TB
- 00:38 LA – MARSHALL, Timon 28 yd pass from KELLER, Sam (FREDRICKSON, Ty kick) – 72–47 TB
- Officials: Referee: Bill McCabe; Umpire: Mike Delaney; Linesman: Shawn Hochuli; Line judge: Dirk Bell; Back judge: Jimmy Buchanan
- Offensive Player of the Game: Brett Dietz (TB)
- Defensive Player of the Game: Traco Rachal (TB)
- Ironman Player of the Game: Lawrence Samuels (TB)
