= 2008 Orlando Predators season =

Arena Football League team season

- Head coach: Jay Gruden
- Home stadium: Amway Arena

Results
- Record: 9–7
- Division place: 2nd
- Playoffs: Lost Wild Card Playoffs (Gladiators) 66–69

The 2008 Orlando Predators season was the 18th season for the franchise. Finishing the regular season with a 9–7 record, the Predators made the playoffs for the 17th consecutive year. In this season, they made the playoffs as the 5th seed in the National Conference. The Predators were eliminated in the Wild Card round of the playoffs, losing to the Cleveland Gladiators, 66–69.

== Standings ==
Southern Division
Team	W	L	PCT	PF	PA	DIV	CON	Home	Away
y-Georgia Force	10	6	.625	927	848	3–3	6–4	6–2	4–4
x-Orlando Predators	9	7	.563	881	898	3–3	4–6	5–3	4–4
Tampa Bay Storm	8	8	.500	903	876	4–2	5–5	5–3	3–5
New Orleans VooDoo	8	8	.500	893	835	2–4	2–6	6–2	2–6

y - Clinched division
x - Clinched playoff berth

== Regular season schedule ==
Week	Date	Opponent	Result	Record	Location	Attendance	Recap
1	March 1	at Philadelphia Soul	L 56–77	0–1	Wachovia Center	17,869	Recap
2	March 9	at New Orleans VooDoo	L 53–54	0–2	New Orleans Arena	13,042	Recap
3	March 14	Utah Blaze	W 69–61	1–2	Amway Arena	11,861	Recap
4	March 22	Georgia Force	W 50–45	2–2	Amway Arena	12,107	Recap
5	March 29	at Columbus Destroyers	W 47–44	3–2	Nationwide Arena	13,035	Recap
6	April 6	Chicago Rush	W 57–56 (OT)	4–2	Amway Arena	12,483	Recap
7	April 13	at Grand Rapids Rampage	W 75–56	5–2	Van Andel Arena	6,946	Recap
8	April 19	at Georgia Force	W 65–62	6–2	The Arena at Gwinnett Center	10,079	Recap
9	April 26	Tampa Bay Storm	L 41–48	6–3	Amway Arena	13,365	Recap
10	May 3	San Jose SaberCats	W 61–35	7–3	Amway Arena	11,733	Recap
11	May 9	at Cleveland Gladiators	L 43–62	7–4	Quicken Loans Arena	13,808	Recap
12	May 18	at Kansas City Brigade	W 58–51	8–4	Sprint Center	10,992	Recap
13	May 23	Dallas Desperados	L 41–67	8–5	Amway Arena	12,366	Recap
14	May 31	Arizona Rattlers	L 53–60	8–6	Amway Arena	12,821	Recap
15	June 7	at Tampa Bay Storm	L 61–71	8–7	St. Pete Times Forum	17,344	Recap
16	June 13	New Orleans VooDoo	W 51–49	9–7	Amway Arena	13,423	Recap
17	Bye Week						

== Playoff schedule ==
Round	Date	Opponent (seed)	Result	Location	Attendance	Recap
NC Wild Card	June 30	at Cleveland Gladiators (4)	L 66–69	Quicken Loans Arena	13,896	Recap

== Roster ==
Uniform #	Player	Position	Height	Weight (lb)					
1	Jake Eaton	QB	6' 2"	215					
2	Damon Mason	DB	5' 9"	195					
3	Ron Johnson	WR	6' 3"	223					
4	Ahmad Carroll	DB	5' 11"	190					
5	B.J. Cohen	DL	6' 2"	280					
9	Marlon Moye-Moore	FB/LB	6' 2"	240					
14	Shane Stafford	QB	6' 3"	220					
15	John Vaughn	K	6' 0"	200					
17	T.T. Toliver	WR	5' 11	175					
21	Chas Gessner	WR	6' 5"	220					
28	Kenny McEntyre	DB	5' 11"	175					
34	Odie Armstrong	FB	5' 11"	265					
42	Nick Allison	DB	5' 11"	180					
44	Brian Ballantine	LB	6'1"	235	53	Steve Baggs	LB	6' 2"	245
55	Chris Jahnke	OL	6' 5"	315					
62	Johnathan Clinkscale	OL	6' 3"	315					
65	Tim Goins	OL	6' 3"	300					
68	Darrell Campbell	DL	6' 4"	290					
72	Jasper Harvey	OL	6' 3"	315					
75	Bobby Harris	OL	6' 4"	315					
96	Doug Miller	DL	6' 2"	290					
98	Charles Hill	OL/DL	6' 3"	300					

== Regular season ==
=== Week 1: at Philadelphia Soul ===
Quarter	1	2	3	4	Total
ORL	9	13	14	20	56
PHI	14	21	21	21	77

at Wachovia Center, Philadelphia, Pennsylvania

- Date: March 1
- Game time: 7:00 PM EST
- Game attendance: 17,869

Game information

1st Quarter:

- PHI- Wes Ours 7 YD pass from Tony Graziani (Connor Hughes kick) – 7–0 PHI
- ORL- John Vaughn 25 YD FG – 7–3 PHI
- PHI- Larry Brackins 30 YD pass from Tony Graziani (Connor Hughes kick) – 14–3 PHI
- ORL- T.T. Toliver 30 YD pass from Shane Stafford (Jonh Vaughn kick failed) – 14–9 PHI

2nd Quarter:

- PHI- Chris Jackson 9 YD pass from Tony Graziani (Connor Hughes kick) – 21–9 PHI
- ORL- Chas Gessner 13 YD pass from Shane Stafford (John Vaughn kick failed) – 21–15 PHI
- PHI- Chris Jackson 29 YD pass from Tony Graziani (Connor Hughes kick) – 28–15 PHI
- ORL- Chas Gessner 7 YD pass from Shane Stafford (John Vaughn kick) – 28–22 PHI
- PHI- Kenny Henderson 23 YD pass from Tony Graziani (Connor Hughes kick) – 35–22 PHI

3rd Quarter:

- PHI- Larry Brackins 9 YD pass from Tony Graziani (Connor Hughes kick) – 42–22 PHI
- PHI- Clifton Smith 3 YD run (Connor Hughes kick) – 49–22 PHI
- ORL- Chas Gessner 14 YD pass from Shane Stafford (John Vaughn kick) – 49–29 PHI
- PHI- Mike Brown 56 YD Kickoff Return (Connor Hughes kick) 56–29 PHI
- ORL- T.T. Toliver 15 YD pass from Shane Stafford (John Vaughn kick) – 56–36 PHI

4th Quarter:

- PHI- Chris Jackson 13 YD pass from Tony Graziani (Connor Hughes kick) – 63–36 PHI
- ORL- T.T. Toliver 18 YD pass from Shane Stafford (Two-Point Conversion failed) – 63–42 PHI
- PHI- Chris Jackson 10 YD pass from Tony Graziani (Connor Hughes kick) – 70–42 PHI
- ORL- T.T. Toliver 18 YD pass from Shane Stafford (John Vaughn kick) – 70–49 PHI
- PHI- Larry Brackins 38 YD pass from Tony Graziani (Connor Hughes kick) – 77–49 PHI
- ORL- Chas Gessner 8 YD pass from Shane Stafford (John Vaughn kick) – 77–56 PHI
- Officials: Referee: Bill McCabe; Umpire: Mike Delaney; Linesman: Shawn Hochuli; Line judge: Dirk Bell; Back judge: Jimmy Buchanan
- Offensive Player of the Game: Chris Jackson (PHI)
- Defensive Player of the Game: Tom Johnson (PHI)
- Ironman Player of the Game: Mike Brown (PHI)

=== Week 2: at New Orleans VooDoo ===
Quarter	1	2	3	4	Total
ORL	13	14	13	13	53
NO	7	27	7	13	54

at New Orleans Arena, New Orleans, Louisiana

- Date: March 9
- Game time: 3:00 PM EST
- Game attendance: 13,042

Game information

1st Quarter:

- 11:50 ORL – Moye-Moore, Mar 1 yd run (Vaughn, John kick failed) – 6–0 ORL
- 10:03 NO – Jordan, James 14 yd pass from Wimprine, Danny (Ruffin, Jonatha kick) – 7–6 NO
- 02:39 ORL – Moye-Moore, Mar 1 yd run (Vaughn, John kick) – 13–7 ORL

2nd Quarter:

- 11:01 NO – McAlmont, Kevin 4 yd pass from Wimprine, Danny (Ruffin, Jonatha kick failed) – 13–13
- 07:45 ORL – Moye-Moore, Mar 1 yd run (Vaughn, John kick) – 20–13 ORL
- 04:39 NO – Dudley, Javarus 19 yd pass from Wimprine, Danny (Ruffin, Jonatha kick) – 20–20
- 03:04 ORL – Toliver, T.T. 37 yd pass from Stafford, Shane (Vaughn, John kick) – 27–20 ORL
- 00:26 NO – Jordan, James 3 yd pass from Wimprine, Danny (Ruffin, Jonatha kick) – 27–27
- 00:24 NO – Shell, Lin-J 3 yd net recovery (Ruffin, Jonatha kick) – 34–27 NO

3rd Quarter:

- 06:48 ORL – Gessner, Chas 13 yd pass from Stafford, Shane (Vaughn, John kick failed) – 34–33 NO
- 05:11 NO – Dudley, Javarus 29 yd pass from Wimprine, Danny (Ruffin, Jonatha kick) – 41–33 NO
- 03:11 ORL – Toliver, T.T. 26 yd pass from Stafford, Shane (Vaughn, John kick) – 41–40 NO

4th Quarter:

- 12:12 ORL – Carroll, Ahmad 47 yd fumble recovery (Vaughn, John kick) – 47–41 ORL
- 05:43 NO – Jordan, James 2 yd pass from Wimprine, Danny (Ruffin, Jonatha kick) 48–47 NO
- 00:36 NO – Raymond, Keon 42 yd interception return (Ruffin, Jonatha kick failed) 54–27 NO
- 00:00 ORL – Toliver, T.T. 26 yd pass from Stafford, Shane – 54–53 NO
- Officials: Referee: Dave Cutaia; Umpire: Al Granado; Linesman: Mike McCabe; Line judge: Art Lucky; Back judge: James Cole
- Offensive Player of the Game: Danny Wimprine (NO)
- Defensive Player of the Game: Keon Raymond (NO)
- Ironman Player of the Game: Lin-J Shell (NO)

=== Week 3: vs. Utah Blaze ===
Quarter	1	2	3	4	Total
UTA	7	28	14	12	61
ORL	14	21	21	13	69

at Amway Arena, Orlando, Florida

- Date: March 14
- Game time: 7:30 PM EST
- Game attendance: 9,722

Game information

1st Quarter:

- 14:43 ORL – TOLIVER, T.T. 54 yd kickoff return (VAUGHN, John kick) – 7–0 ORL
- 05:14 UTA – MCKELVEY, J.J. 8 yd pass from GERMAINE, Joe (AZAR, Steve kick) – 7–7
- 00:00 ORL – JOHNSON, Ron 7 yd pass from STAFFORD, Shane (VAUGHN, John kick) – 14–7 ORL

2nd Quarter:

- 11:50 UTA – MCKELVEY, J.J. 9 yd pass from GERMAINE, Joe (AZAR, Steve kick) – 14–14
- 07:39 UTA – MCKELVEY, J.J. 9 yd pass from GERMAINE, Joe (AZAR, Steve kick) – 21–14 UTA
- 07:02 ORL – MOYE-MOORE, M. 2 yd run (VAUGHN, John kick) – 21–21
- 01:41 UTA – MCKELVEY, J.J. 12 yd pass from GERMAINE, Joe (AZAR, Steve kick) – 28–21 UTA
- 00:54 ORL – GESSNER, Chas 47 yd pass from STAFFORD, Shane (VAUGHN, John kick) – 28–28
- 00:33 UTA – GERMAINE, Joe 1 yd run (AZAR, Steve kick) – 35–28 UTA
- 00:07 ORL – TOLIVER, T.T. 20 yd pass from STAFFORD, Shane (VAUGHN, John kick) – 35–35

3rd Quarter:

- 12:05 UTA – MCKELVEY, J.J. 20 yd pass from GERMAINE, Joe (AZAR, Steve kick) – 42–35 UTA
- 09:57 ORL – TOLIVER, T.T. 26 yd pass from STAFFORD, Shane (VAUGHN, John kick) – 42–42
- 08:35 UTA – BOONE, Aaron 45 yd pass from GERMAINE, Joe (AZAR, Steve kick) – 49–42 UTA
- 04:07 ORL – MOYE-MOORE, M. 2 yd run (VAUGHN, John kick) – 49–49
- 01:57 ORL – MOYE-MOORE, M. 1 yd run (VAUGHN, John kick) – 56–49 ORL

4th Quarter:

- 11:43 UTA – WHITTAKER, Huey 3 yd run (AZAR, Steve kick failed) – 56–55 ORL
- 06:34 ORL – GESSNER, Chas 5 yd pass from STAFFORD, Shane (VAUGHN, John kick) – 63–55 ORL
- 01:01 UTA – BOONE, Aaron 5 yd pass from GERMAINE, Joe (WHITTAKER, Huey rush failed) – 63–61 ORL
- 00:27 ORL – TOLIVER, T.T. 5 yd pass from STAFFORD, Shane (VAUGHN, John kick failed) – 69–61 ORL
- Officials: Referee: Dave Lambros; Umpire: Doug Wilson; Linesman: Kelly Saalfeld; Line judge: Brian Matthew; Back judge: Rich Wilborn
- Offensive Player of the Game: BJ Cohen (ORL)
- Defensive Player of the Game: T.T. Toliver (ORL)
- Ironman Player of the Game: Marlon Moye-Moore (ORL)

=== Week 4: vs. Georgia Force ===
Quarter	1	2	3	4	Total
GA	21	7	10	7	45
ORL	10	21	7	12	50

at Amway Arena, Orlando, Florida

- Date: March 22
- Game time: 7:30 PM EST
- Game attendance: 12,107

Game information

1st Quarter:

- 11:02 ORL – VAUGHN, John 23 yd field goal – 3–0 ORL
- 05:41 GA – MARSHALL, W. 1 yd run (MARTINEZ, C. kick) – 7–3 GA
- 03:21 ORL – TOLIVER, T.T. 10 yd pass from STAFFORD, Shane (VAUGHN, John kick) – 10–7 ORL
- 01:21 GA – MORRIS, Carl 13 yd pass from GREISEN, Chris (MARTINEZ, C. kick) 14–10 GA
- 00:00 GA – NEWTON, Cam 7 yd fumble recovery (MARTINEZ, C. kick) 21–10 GA

2nd Quarter:

- 14:00 ORL – TOLIVER, T.T. 40 yd pass from STAFFORD, Shane (VAUGHN, John kick) – 21–17 GA
- 09:36 ORL – TOLIVER, T.T. 35 yd pass from STAFFORD, Shane (VAUGHN, John kick) – 24–21 ORL
- 04:46 GA – PAULEY, Charles 9 yd pass from GREISEN, Chris (MARTINEZ, C. kick) – 28–24 GA
- 00:04 ORL – GESSNER, Chas 1 yd pass from STAFFORD, Shane (VAUGHN, John kick) – 31–28 ORL

3rd Quarter:

- 11:11 GA – PAULEY, Charles 19 yd pass from GREISEN, Chris (MARTINEZ, C. kick) – 35–31 GA
- 04:46 GA – MARTINEZ, C. 23 yd field goal – 38–31 GA
- 02:50 ORL – MOYE-MOORE, M. 2 yd run (VAUGHN, John kick) 38–38

4th Quarter:

- 14:56 GA – PAULEY, Charles 13 yd pass from GREISEN, Chris (MARTINEZ, C. kick) – 45–38 GA
- 12:01 ORL – JOHNSON, Ron 7 yd pass from STAFFORD, Shane (VAUGHN, John kick failed) – 45–44 GA
- 00:22 ORL – GESSNER, Chas 23 yd pass from STAFFORD, Shane (STAFFORD, Shane pass failed) – 50–45 ORL
- Officials: Referee: Tom McCabe; Umpire: Wes Fritz; Linesman: Neil Brunner; Line judge: Paul Engelberts; Back judge: Tony Lombardo
- Offensive Player of the Game: T.T. Toliver (ORL)
- Defensive Player of the Game: Kenny McEntyre (ORL)
- Ironman Player of the Game: Marlon Moye-Moore (ORL)

=== Week 5: at Columbus Destroyers ===
Quarter	1	2	3	4	Total
ORL	7	16	7	17	47
CLB	10	6	14	14	44

at Nationwide Arena, Columbus, Ohio

- Date: March 29
- Game time: 7:00 PM EST
- Game attendance: N/A

Game information

1st Quarter:

- 11:23 CLB – LEWIS, Mark 43 yd field goal – 3–0 CLB
- 10:06 ORL – Johnson, Ron 31 yd pass from Stafford, Shane (Vaughn, John kick) – 7–3 ORL
- 03:05 CLB – WELLS, Harold 1 yd run (LEWIS, Mark kick) – 10–7 CLB

2nd Quarter:

- 13:52 ORL – Gessner, Chas 4 yd pass from Stafford, Shane (Vaughn, John kick) – 14–10 ORL
- 12:02 ORL – Schroeder, Rob safety – 16–10 ORL
- 07:21 ORL – Moye-Moore, M. 1 yd run (Vaughn, John kick) – 23–10 ORL
- 03:31 CLB – LEE, Derek 12 yd pass from NAGY, Matt (LEWIS, Mark kick failed) – 23–16 ORL

3rd Quarter:

- 09:58 CLB – LEE, Derek 32 yd pass from NAGY, Matt (LEWIS, Mark kick) – 23–23
- 06:27 ORL – Moye-Moore, M. 1 yd run (Vaughn, John kick) – 30–23 ORL
- 00:58 CLB – WELLS, Harold 2 yd run (LEWIS, Mark kick) – 30–30

4th Quarter:

- 14:05 ORL – Gessner, Chas 3 yd pass from Stafford, Shane (Vaughn, John kick) – 37–30 ORL
- 10:56 CLB – NAGY, Matt 3 yd run (LEWIS, Mark kick) – 37–37
- 06:46 ORL – Hill, Charles 4 yd pass from Stafford, Shane (Vaughn, John kick) – 44–37 ORL
- 03:03 CLB – WELLS, Harold 6 yd pass from NAGY, Matt (LEWIS, Mark kick) – 44–44
- 00:00 ORL – Vaughn, John 32 yd field goal – 47–44 ORL
- Officials: Referee: Pat Garvey; Umpire: Paul King; Linesman: Bill Ward; Line judge: Bob McElwee; Back judge: James DeBell
- Offensive Player of the Game: N/A
- Defensive Player of the Game: N/A
- Ironman Player of the Game: N/A

=== Week 6: vs. Chicago Rush ===
Quarter	1	2	3	4	OT	Total
CHI	14	7	14	14	7	56
ORL	13	14	0	22	8	57

at Amway Arena, Orlando, Florida

- Date: April 6
- Game time: 2:00 PM EST
- Game attendance: 12,483

Game information

1st Quarter:

- 11:44 CHI – DENNARD, Ryan 14 yd pass from BONNER, S. (FRANTZ, Dan kick) – 7–0 CHI
- 04:42 CHI – MICHNA, Russ 1 yd run (FRANTZ, Dan kick) – 14–0 CHI
- 03:43 ORL – TOLIVER, T.T. 55 yd kickoff return (VAUGHN, John kick failed) – 14–6 CHI
- 01:43 ORL – ALLISON, Nick 11 yd interception return (VAUGHN, John kick) – 14–13 CHI

2nd Quarter:

- 13:30 CHI – DENNARD, Ryan 27 yd pass from BONNER, S. (FRANTZ, Dan kick) – 21–13 CHI
- 06:17 ORL – JOHNSON, Ron 4 yd pass from STAFFORD, Shane (VAUGHN, John kick) – 21–20 CHI
- 00:11 ORL – HILL, Charles 17 yd pass from STAFFORD, Shane (VAUGHN, John kick) – 27–21 ORL

3rd Quarter:

- 12:00 CHI – UNERTL, Jeremy 25 yd interception return (FRANTZ, Dan kick) – 28–27 CHI
- 09:10 CHI – ALFONZO, DeJuan 10 yd fumble recovery (FRANTZ, Dan kick) – 35–27 CHI

4th Quarter:

- 14:56 ORL – TOLIVER, T.T. 25 yd pass from STAFFORD, Shane (ARMSTRONG, Odie rush) – 35–35
- 11:20 CHI – DENNARD, Ryan 9 yd pass from BONNER, S. (FRANTZ, Dan kick) – 42–35 CHI
- 08:13 ORL – TOLIVER, T.T. 7 yd pass from STAFFORD, Shane (VAUGHN, John kick) – 42–42
- 04:10 CHI – ALEXANDER, Dan 1 yd run (FRANTZ, Dan kick) – 49–42 CHI
- 00:00 ORL – GESSNER, Chas 2 yd pass from STAFFORD, Shane (VAUGHN, John kick) – 49–49

Overtime:

- 15:00 CHI – BOSS, Robert 20 yd pass from BONNER, S. (FRANTZ, Dan kick) – 56–48 CHI
- 10:38 ORL – TOLIVER, T.T. 14 yd pass from STAFFORD, Shane (MOYE-MOORE, M. rush) – 57–56 ORL
- Officials: Referee: Bill LeMonnier; Umpire: Jeff Carr; Linesman: Greg Shields; Line judge: Dave Chesney; Back judge: Jimmy Buchanan; Field judge: Buddy Ward
- Offensive Player of the Game: T.T. Toliver (ORL)
- Defensive Player of the Game: DeJuan Alfonso (CHI)
- Ironman Player of the Game: Marlon Moye-Moore (ORL)

=== Week 7: at Grand Rapids Rampage ===
Quarter	1	2	3	4	Total
ORL	13	34	28	0	75
GR	7	14	14	21	56

at Van Andel Arena, Grand Rapids, Michigan

- Date: April 13
- Game time: 2:00 PM EST
- Game attendance: 6,946

Game information

1st Quarter:

- 13:28 GR – Anthony Hines 15 yd pass from James MacPherson (Brian Gowins kick) – 7–0 GR
- 10:42 ORL – T.T. Toliver 30 yd pass from Shane Stafford (John Vaughn kick) – 7–7
- 00:00 ORL – Marlon Moye-Moore 3 yd run (John Vaughn kick failed) – 13–7 ORL

2nd Quarter:

- 13:43 GR – Kenny Higgins 8 yd pass from James MacPherson (Brian Gowins kick) – 14–13 GR
- 11:06 ORL – Odie Armstrong 39 yd pass from Shane Stafford (John Vaughn kick) – 20–14 ORL
- 09:52 ORL – Ron Johnson 4 yd interception return (John Vaughn kick) – 27–14 ORL
- 05:35 ORL – Marlon Moye-Moore 3 yd run (John Vaughn kick) – 34–14 ORL
- 03:44 ORL – B.J. Cohen 0 yd fumble recovery (John Vaughn kick) – 41–14 ORL
- 01:23 GR – Kenny Higgins 12 yd pass from James MacPherson (Brian Gowins kick) – 41–21 ORL
- 00:10 ORL – T.T. Toliver 10 yd pass from Shane Stafford (John Vaughn kick failed) – 47–21 ORL

3rd Quarter:

- 11:33 ORL – Chas Gessner 4 yd pass from Shane Stafford (John Vaughn kick) – 54–21 ORL
- 10:19 ORL – Ahmad Carroll 4 yd net recovery (John Vaughn kick) – 61–21 ORL
- 07:25 GR – Anthony Hines 20 yd pass from James MacPherson (Brian Gowins kick) – 61–28 ORL
- 04:58 ORL – T.T. Toliver 28 yd run (John Vaughn kick) – 68–28 ORL
- 04:02 GR – Chris Martin 56 yd kickoff return (Brian Gowins kick) – 68–35 ORL
- 01:13 ORL – T.T. Toliver 43 yd pass from Jake Eaton (John Vaughn kick) – 75–35 ORL

4th Quarter:

- 10:21 GR – Kenny Higgins 1 yd run (Brian Gowins kick) – 75–42 ORL
- 08:58 GR – Jermaine Lewis 4 yd pass from James MacPherson (Brian Gowins kick) – 75–49 ORL
- 01:28 GR – Kenny Higgins 36 yd pass from James MacPherson (Brian Gowins kick) – 75–56 ORL
- Officials: Referee: Bill McCabe; Umpire: Mike Delaney; Linesman: Shawn Hochuli; Line judge: Derk Bell; Back judge: Jimmy Buchanan
- Offensive Player of the Game: T.T. Toliver (ORL)
- Defensive Player of the Game: Rob Schroeder (ORL)
- Ironman Player of the Game: Marlon Moye-Moore (ORL)

=== Week 8: at Georgia Force ===
Quarter	1	2	3	4	Total
ORL	21	10	14	20	65
GA	7	26	14	15	62

at The Arena at Gwinnett Center, Duluth, Georgia

- Date: April 19
- Game time: 7:00 PM EST
- Game attendance: 10,009

Game information

1st Quarter:

- 10:50 ORL – GESSNER, Chas 8 yd pass from STAFFORD, Shane (VAUGHN, John kick) – 7–0 ORL
- 08:17 ORL – MCENTYRE, Kenny 13 yd interception return (VAUGHN, John kick) – 14–0 ORL
- 04:11 GA – BERGERON, Troy 4 yd pass from GREISEN, Chris (MARTINEZ, Carlo kick) – 14–7 ORL
- 00:28 ORL – ARMSTRONG, Odie 33 yd pass from STAFFORD, Shane (VAUGHN, John kick) – 21–7 ORL

2nd Quarter:

- 12:52 GA – MORRIS, Carl 4 yd pass from GREISEN, Chris (MARTINEZ, Carlo kick) – 21–14 ORL
- 09:19 ORL – VAUGHN, John 33 yd field goal – 24–14 ORL
- 04:50 GA – MARTINEZ, Carlo 29 yd field goal – 24–17 ORL
- 02:55 GA – NEWTON, Cam 12 yd interception return (MARTINEZ, Carlo kick) – 24–24
- 00:45 GA – HUEBNER, Matt 1 yd run (MARTINEZ, Carlo kick failed) – 30–24 GA
- 00:25 ORL – ARMSTRONG, Odie 18 yd pass from STAFFORD, Shane (VAUGHN, John kick) – 31–30 ORL
- 00:00 GA – MARTINEZ, Carlo 31 yd field goal – 33–31 GA

3rd Quarter:

- 09:56 ORL – JOHNSON, Ron 3 yd pass from EATON, Jake (VAUGHN, John kick) – 38–33 ORL
- 08:32 GA – JONES, Tiger 24 yd pass from GREISEN, Chris (MARTINEZ, Carlo kick) – 40–38 GA
- 04:26 ORL – GESSNER, Chas 14 yd pass from EATON, Jake (VAUGHN, John kick) – 45–40 ORL
- 00:47 GA – JONES, Tiger 13 yd pass from GREISEN, Chris (MARTINEZ, Carlo kick) – 47–45 ORL

4th Quarter:

- 10:51 ORL – STAFFORD, Shane 1 yd run (VAUGHN, John kick) – 52–47 ORL
- 08:51 GA – HUEBNER, Matt 2 yd run (MARTINEZ, Carlo kick) – 54–52 GA
- 06:16 GA – SMITH, Jermaine safety – 56–52 GA
- 05:39 GA – BERGERON, Troy 35 yd pass from GREISEN, Chris (MARTINEZ, Carlo kick failed) – 62–52 GA
- 03:30 ORL – GESSNER, Chas 1 yd pass from STAFFORD, Shane (VAUGHN, John kick) – 62–59 GA
- 00:05 ORL – GESSNER, Chas 8 yd pass from STAFFORD, Shane (VAUGHN, John kick failed) – 65–62 ORL
- Officials: Referee: Riley Johnson; Umpire: Rick Lowe; Linesman: Julian Mapp; Line judge: RG Detillier; Back judge: Bud McCleskey
- Offensive Player of the Game: Odie Armstrong (ORL)
- Defensive Player of the Game: Ernest Allen (GA)
- Ironman Player of the Game: T.T. Toliver (ORL)

=== Week 9: vs. Tampa Bay Storm ===
Week 9: Tampa Bay Storm vs. Orlando Predators

Quarter	1	2	3	4	Total
Storm	7	17	14	10	48
Predators	7	7	14	13	41

at Amway Arena, Orlando, Florida

- Date: April 26, 2008
- Game time: 7:00 p.m. EST
- Game attendance: 13,365
- Recap

Game information

First quarter

- ORL – T. T. Toliver 8-yard pass from Shane Stafford (John Vaughn kick), 7:40. Predators 7–0
- TB – Lawrence Samuels 6-yard pass from Brett Dietz (Seth Marler kick), 3:14. Tied 7–7

Second quarter

- ORL – Shane Stafford 1-yard run (John Vaughn kick), 12:08. Predators 14–7
- TB – Hank Edwards 3-yard pass from Brett Dietz (Seth Marler kick), 7:18. Tied 14–14
- TB – Seth Marler 32-yard field goal, 2:00. Storm 17–14
- TB – Tom Briggs 3-yard interception return (Seth Marler kick), 1:19. Storm 24–14

Third quarter

- ORL – Chas Gessner 13-yard pass from Shane Stafford (John Vaughn kick), 13:30. Storm 24–21
- TB – Torrance Marshall 2-yard run (Seth Marler kick), 8:07. Storm 31–21
- ORL – Chris Jahnke 11-yard pass from Shane Stafford (John Vaughn kick), 5:06. Storm 31–28
- TB – Torrance Marshall 1-yard run (Seth Marler kick), 0:52. Storm 38–28

Fourth quarter

- TB – Lawrence Samuels 8-yard interception return (Seth Marler kick), 14:18. Storm 45–28
- TB – Seth Marler 29-yard field goal, 9:38. Storm 48–28
- ORL – Chas Gessner 5-yard pass from Shane Stafford (kick blocked), 7:24. Storm 48–34
- ORL – T. T. Toliver 8-yard pass from Shane Stafford (John Vaughn kick), 3:02. Storm 48–41

Top passers

- TB – Brett Dietz – 17/31, 171 yards, 2 TD
- ORL – Shane Stafford – 25/32, 266 yards, 5 TD, 2 INT

Top rushers

- TB – Torrance Marshall – 10 rushes, 24 yards, 2 TD
- ORL – Shane Stafford – 5 rushes, -7 yards, TD

Top receivers

- TB – Lawrence Samuels – 5 receptions, 45 yards, TD
- ORL – Chas Gessner – 11 receptions, 110 yards, 2 TD

=== Week 10: vs. San Jose SaberCats ===
Quarter	1	2	3	4	Total
SJ	7	0	21	7	35
ORL	17	10	14	20	61

at Amway Arena, Orlando, Florida

- Date: May 3
- Game time: 7:30 PM EST
- Game attendance: 11,733

Game information

1st Quarter:

- 12:00 ORL – VAUGHN, John 28 yd field goal – 3–0 ORL
- 11:23 ORL – PERRY, Jason 0 yd fumble recovery (VAUGHN, John kick) – 10–0 ORL
- 09:22 SJ – ROE, James 20 yd pass from GRIEB, Mark (HAGLUND, A.J. kick) – 10–7 ORL
- 00:28 ORL – MCENTYRE, Kenny 9 yd interception return (VAUGHN, John kick) – 17–7 ORL

2nd Quarter:

- 06:17 ORL – TOLIVER, T.T. 9 yd pass from STAFFORD, Shane (VAUGHN, John kick) – 24–7 ORL
- 00:55 ORL – VAUGHN, John 28 yd field goal – 27–7 ORL

3rd Quarter:

- 12:41 SJ – ROE, James 10 yd pass from GRIEB, Mark (HAGLUND, A.J. kick) – 27–14 ORL
- 07:33 SJ – WRIGHT, Rodney 7 yd pass from GRIEB, Mark (HAGLUND, A.J. kick) – 27–21 ORL
- 06:41 ORL – TOLIVER, T.T. 58 yd kickoff return (VAUGHN, John kick) – 34–21 ORL
- 03:39 SJ – SAINTIL, C. 4 yd pass from GRIEB, Mark (HAGLUND, A.J. kick) – 34–28 ORL
- 00:07 ORL – JOHNSON, Ron 7 yd pass from EATON, Jake (VAUGHN, John kick) – 41–28 ORL

4th Quarter:

- 14:19 SJ – ROE, James 5 yd pass from GRIEB, Mark (HAGLUND, A.J. kick) – 41–35 ORL
- 05:13 ORL – EATON, Jake 6 yd run (EATON, Jake pass failed) – 47–35 ORL
- 03:08 ORL – EATON, Jake 5 yd run (VAUGHN, John kick) – 54–35 ORL
- 00:41 ORL – MCENTYRE, Kenny 47 yd interception return (VAUGHN, John kick) – 61–35 ORL
- Officials: Referee: Dennis Lipski; Umpire: Rick Nelson; Linesman: Brent Durbin; Line judge: Darrel Leftwich; Back judge: Reggie Smith
- Offensive Player of the Game: Jake Eaton (ORL)
- Defensive Player of the Game: Kenny McEntyre (ORL)
- Ironman Player of the Game: T.T. Toliver (ORL)

=== Week 11: at Cleveland Gladiators ===
Quarter	1	2	3	4	Total
ORL	13	9	7	14	43
CLE	7	20	21	14	62

at Quicken Loans Arena, Cleveland, Ohio

- Date: May 9
- Game time: 7:00 PM EST
- Game attendance: 13,808

Game information

1st Quarter:

- 11:32 ORL – HILL 4 yd pass from STAFFORD (FRANCE kick failed) – 6–0 ORL
- 05:11 CLE – PHILYAW 6 yd pass from REDD (BALL kick) – 7–6 CLE
- 01:43 ORL – TOLIVER 31 yd pass from STAFFORD (FRANCE kick) – 13–7 ORL

2nd Quarter:

- 13:07 CLE – REDD 9 yd pass from PHILYAW (BALL kick) – 14–13 CLE
- 06:58 CLE – AMEY 3 yd pass from PHILYAW (BALL kick failed) – 20–13 CLE
- 04:06 ORL – JOHNSON 8 yd pass from STAFFORD (FRANCE kick failed) – 20–19 CLE
- 00:19 CLE – REDD 19 yd pass from PHILYAW (BALL kick) – 27–19 CLE
- 00:00 ORL – FRANCE 43 yd field goal – 27–22 CLE

3rd Quarter:

- 12:45 CLE – AMEY 14 yd pass from PHILYAW (BALL kick) – 34–22 CLE
- 12:01 ORL – JOHNSON 30 yd pass from STAFFORD (FRANCE kick) – 34–29 CLE
- 10:48 CLE – WRIGHT 27 yd pass from PHILYAW (BALL kick) – 41–29 CLE
- 02:01 CLE – REDD 27 yd pass from PHILYAW (BALL kick) – 48–29 CLE

4th Quarter:

- 14:22 ORL – GESSNER 3 yd pass from STAFFORD (GESSNER pass from STAFFORD) – 48–37 CLE
- 09:36 CLE – AMEY 11 yd pass from PHILYAW (BALL kick) – 55–37 CLE
- 07:25 ORL – JOHNSON 7 yd pass from STAFFORD (STAFFORD pass failed) – 55–43 CLE
- 05:54 CLE – MARSHALL 7 yd run (BALL kick) – 62–43 CLE
- Officials: Referee: Dave Cutaia; Umpire: Paul Frerking; Linesman: Mike McCabe; Line judge: Art Lucky; Back judge: James Cole
- Offensive Player of the Game: Robert Redd (CLE)
- Defensive Player of the Game: Joe Minucci (CLE)
- Ironman Player of the Game: Sakeen Wright (CLE)

=== Week 12: at Kansas City Brigade ===
Quarter	1	2	3	4	Total
ORL	14	21	9	14	58
KC	14	17	13	7	51

at Sprint Center, Kansas City, Missouri

- Date: May 18
- Game time: 2:00 PM EST
- Game attendance: 10,992

Game information

1st Quarter:

- 12:39 ORL – Shane Stafford 9 yd run (Todd France kick) – 7–0 ORL
- 11:17 KC – Jerel Myers 37 yd pass from D. Bryant (Peter Martinez kick) – 7–7
- 05:27 ORL – Kevin Nickerson 3 yd run (Todd France kick) – 14–7 ORL
- 00:58 KC – D. Bryant 4 yd run (Peter Martinez kick) – 14–14

2nd Quarter:

- 14:57 KC – D. Bryant 3 yd run (Peter Martinez kick) – 21–14 KC
- 09:42 ORL – Odie Armstrong 4 yd pass from Shane Stafford (Todd France kick) – 21–21
- 02:35 KC – D. Bryant 1 yd run (Peter Martinez kick) – 28–21 KC
- 00:28 KC – Peter Martinez 25 yd field goal – 31–21 KC
- 00:12 ORL – T.T. Toliver 4 yd pass from Shane Stafford (Todd France kick) – 31–28 KC
- 00:00 ORL – B.J. Cohen 0 yd fumble recovery (Todd France kick) – 35–31 ORL

3rd Quarter:

- 14:48 KC – Jerel Myers 54 yd kickoff return (Peter Martinez kick failed) – 37–35 KC
- 10:53 ORL – TEAM safety – 37–37
- 09:40 ORL – Levon Thomas 48 yd pass from Shane Stafford (Todd France kick) – 44–37 ORL
- 03:38 KC – D. Bryant 6 yd run (Peter Martinez kick) – 44–44

4th Quarter:

- 04:36 ORL – T.T. Toliver 22 yd pass from Shane Stafford (Todd France kick) – 51–44 ORL
- 00:43 KC – D. Bryant 16 yd run (Peter Martinez kick) – 51–51
- 00:04 ORL – Ron Johnson 6 yd pass from Shane Stafford (Todd France kick) – 58–51 ORL
- Officials: Referee: Tom McCabe; Umpire: Rick Podraza; Linesman: Rod Pearson; Line judge: Dana McKenzie; Back judge: Scott Helverson
- Offensive Player of the Game: Shane Stafford (ORL)
- Defensive Player of the Game: B.J. Cohen (ORL)
- Ironman Player of the Game: Jerel Myers (ORL)

=== Week 13: vs. Dallas Desperados ===
Quarter	1	2	3	4	Total
DAL	7	21	25	14	67
ORL	14	14	6	7	41

at Amway Arena, Orlando, Florida

- Date: May 23
- Game time: 7:30 PM EST
- Game attendance: 12,366

Game information

1st Quarter:

- 12:02 ORL – MOYE-MOORE, M. 1 yd run (VAUGHN, John kick) – 7–0 ORL
- 03:50 DAL – NASH, Marcus 6 yd pass from DOLEZEL, Clint (HAMILTON, Remy kick) – 7–7
- 00:38 ORL – NICKERSON, K. 30 yd pass from STAFFORD, Shane (VAUGHN, John kick) – 14–7 ORL

2nd Quarter:

- 12:02 DAL – ARMSTRONG, A. 3 yd pass from PETTIS, Will (HAMILTON, Remy kick) – 14–14
- 07:22 DAL – DOLEZEL, Clint 8 yd run (HAMILTON, Remy kick) – 21–14 DAL
- 03:28 ORL – NICKERSON, K. 4 yd pass from STAFFORD, Shane (VAUGHN, John kick) – 21–21
- 02:12 DAL – NASH, Marcus 40 yd pass from DOLEZEL, Clint (HAMILTON, Remy kick) – 28–21 DAL
- 01:00 ORL – TOLIVER, T.T. 9 yd pass from STAFFORD, Shane (VAUGHN, John kick) – 28–28

3rd Quarter:

- 13:44 DAL – PETTIS, Will 5 yd run (HAMILTON, Remy kick) – 35–28 DAL
- 11:26 DAL – PETTIS, Will 1 yd pass from DOLEZEL, Clint (HAMILTON, Remy kick) – 42–28 DAL
- 10:34 DAL – SIMPKINS, R. safety – 44–28 DAL
- 05:36 DAL – TEAM safety – 46–28 DAL
- 05:11 DAL – ARMSTRONG, A. 6 yd pass from DOLEZEL, Clint (HAMILTON, Remy kick) – 53–28 DAL
- 01:35 ORL – NICKERSON, K. 5 yd pass from EATON, Jake (VAUGHN, John kick failed) – 53–34 DAL

4th Quarter:

- 13:29 DAL – PETTIS, Will 42 yd interception return (HAMILTON, Remy kick) – 60–34 DAL
- 05:42 DAL – WHITE, Josh 8 yd run (HAMILTON, Remy kick) – 67–34 DAL
- 00:50 ORL – TOLIVER, T.T. 12 yd pass from EATON, Jake (VAUGHN, John kick) – 67–41 ORL
- Officials: Referee: Perry Havener; Umpire: Tom Lavertyy; Linesman: Kelly Saalfeld; Line judge: David Meslow; Back judge: K. Washington
- Offensive Player of the Game: Clint Dolezel (DAL)
- Defensive Player of the Game: Bobby Perry (DAL)
- Ironman Player of the Game: Will Pettis (DAL)

=== Week 14: vs. Arizona Rattlers ===
Quarter	1	2	3	4	Total
ARZ	7	22	14	17	60
ORL	6	7	16	24	53

at Amway Arena, Orlando, Florida

- Date: May 31
- Game time: 7:30 PM EST
- Game attendance: 12,821

Game information

1st Quarter:

- 08:17 ORL – RUBIN, DeAndrew 25 yd pass from EATON, Jake (FRANCE, Todd kick blocked) – 6–0 ORL
- 04:15 ARZ – SAUK, Matt 1 yd run (HOULE, Eric kick) – 7–6 ARZ

2nd Quarter:

- 14:49 ARZ – GAINES, Wendall 3 yd pass from SAUK, Matt (HOULE, Eric kick) – 14–6 ARZ
- 03:41 ARZ – DEVOE, Todd 7 yd pass from SAUK, Matt (HOULE, Eric kick blocked) – 20–6 ARZ
- 00:51 ORL – RUBIN, DeAndrew 13 yd pass from STAFFORD, Shane (FRANCE, Todd kick) – 20–13 ARZ
- 00:33 ARZ – BURLEY, Siaha 6 yd pass from SAUK, Matt (HOULE, Eric kick) – 27–13 ARZ
- 00:24 ARZ – BARNO, Dustin safety – 29–13 ARZ

3rd Quarter:

- 12:19 ARZ – BURLEY, Siaha 11 yd pass from SAUK, Matt (HOULE, Eric kick) – 36–13 ARZ
- 06:40 ORL – TOLIVER, T.T. 13 yd pass from STAFFORD, Shane (STAFFORD, Shane rush) – 36–21 ARZ
- 05:23 ARZ – DEVOE, Todd 40 yd pass from SAUK, Matt (HOULE, Eric kick) – 43–21 ARZ
- 00:12 ORL – TOLIVER, T.T. 8 yd pass from STAFFORD, Shane (MOYE-MOORE, M. pass from STAFFORD, Shane) – 43–29 ARZ

4th Quarter:

- 12:16 ARZ – INGRAM, J. 16 yd run (HOULE, Eric kick) – 50–29 ARZ
- 08:28 ORL – ARMSTRONG, Odie 6 yd pass from STAFFORD, Shane (MOYE-MOORE, M. rush) – 50–37 ARZ
- 05:16 ARZ – HOULE, Eric 23 yd field goal – 53–37 ARZ
- 03:46 ORL – THOMAS, Levon 34 yd pass from STAFFORD, Shane (MOYE-MOORE, M. rush) – 53–45 ARZ
- 00:44 ORL – NICKERSON, K. 11 yd pass from STAFFORD, Shane (NICKERSON, K. rush) – 53–53
- 00:05 ARZ – BURLEY, Siaha 19 yd pass from SAUK, Matt (HOULE, Eric kick) – 60–53 ARZ
- Officials: Referee: Bill McCabe; Umpire: Mike Delaney; Linesman: Shawn Hochuli; Line judge: Dirk Bell; Back judge: Jimmy Buchanon
- Offensive Player of the Game: Matt Sauk (ARZ)
- Defensive Player of the Game: Isaiah Trufant (ARZ)
- Ironman Player of the Game: Trandon Harvey (ARZ)

=== Week 15: at Tampa Bay Storm ===
Week 15: Orlando Predators at Tampa Bay Storm

Quarter	1	2	3	4	Total
Predators	12	20	7	22	61
Storm	21	21	15	14	71

at St. Pete Times Forum, Tampa, Florida

- Date: June 7, 2008
- Game time: 7:00 p.m. EST
- Game attendance: 17,344
- Recap

Game information

First quarter

- TB – Hank Edwards 28-yard pass from Brett Dietz (Seth Marler kick), 13:48. Storm 7–0
- ORL – Levon Thomas 16-yard pass from Shane Stafford (kick failed), 9:29. Storm 7–6
- TB – Tom Briggs 4-yard pass from Brett Dietz (Seth Marler kick), 5:04. Storm 14–6
- ORL – John Mohring 36-yard pass from Shane Stafford (kick failed), 3:07. Storm 14–12
- TB – Torrance Marshall 2-yard run (Seth Marler kick), 0:11. Storm 21–12

Second quarter

- ORL – Levon Thomas 24-yard pass from Shane Stafford (kick failed), 11:57. Storm 21–18
- TB – Tyrone Timmons 19-yard pass from Brett Dietz (Seth Marler kick), 7:52. Storm 28–18
- ORL – Marlon Moye-Moore 2-yard run (Dan Frantz kick), 2:33. Storm 28–25
- TB – Hank Edwards 4-yard pass from Brett Dietz (Seth Marler kick), 0:42. Storm 35–25
- ORL – Kevin Nickerson 4-yard pass from Brett Dietz (Dan Frantz kick), 0:05. Storm 35–32
- TB – Sedrick Robinson 58-yard kickoff return (Seth Marler kick), 0:00. Storm 42–32

Third quarter

- TB – Hank Edwards 22-yard pass from Brett Dietz (kick failed), 13:58. Storm 48–32
- TB – Team Safety, 12:12. Storm 50–32
- ORL – T. T. Toliver 27-yard pass from Shane Stafford (Dan Frantz kick), 8:51. Storm 50–39
- TB – Tyrone Timmons 8-yard pass from Brett Dietz (Seth Marler kick), 2:13. Storm 57–39

Fourth quarter

- ORL – T. T. Toliver 4-yard pass from Shane Stafford (kick failed), 13:53. Storm 57–45
- TB – Hank Edwards 16-yard pass from Brett Dietz (Seth Marler kick), 10:44. Storm 64–45
- ORL – Odie Armstrong 11-yard pass from Shane Stafford (Shane Stafford-Odie Armstrong pass), 7:01. Storm 64–53
- TB – Tyrone Timmons 7-yard pass from Brett Dietz (Seth Marler kick), 5:11. Storm 71–53
- ORL – Levon Thomas 5-yard pass from Shane Stafford (Odie Armstrong run) 1:51. Storm 71–61

Top passers

- ORL – Shane Stafford – 27/38, 362 yards, 8 TD, INT
- TB – Brett Dietz – 24/32, 298 yards, 8 TD, INT

Top rushers

- ORL – Odie Armstrong – 3 rushes, 19 yards
- TB – Torrance Marshall – 6 rushes, 16 yards, TD

Top receivers

- ORL – Kevin Nickerson – 10 receptions, 129 yards, TD
- TB – Hank Edwards – 9 receptions, 131 yards, 4 TD

=== Week 16: vs. New Orleans VooDoo ===
Quarter	1	2	3	4	Total
NO	0	27	15	7	49
ORL	7	14	14	16	51

at Amway Arena, Orlando, Florida

- Date: June 13
- Game time: 7:30 PM EST
- Game attendance: 13,423

Game information

1st Quarter:

- 09:53 ORL – ARMSTRONG, Odie 19 yd pass from STAFFORD, Shane (FRANCE, Todd kick) – 7–0 ORL

2nd Quarter:

- 10:29 NO – WIMPRINE, Danny 1 yd run (RUFFIN, J. kick) – 7–7
- 06:09 ORL – THOMAS, Levon 13 yd pass from STAFFORD, Shane (FRANCE, Todd kick) – 14–7 ORL
- 05:07 NO – JORDAN, James 44 yd pass from WIMPRINE, Danny (RUFFIN, J. kick) – 14–14
- 04:02 NO – LYNCH, James 20 yd pass from WIMPRINE, Danny (RUFFIN, J. kick) – 21–14 NO
- 03:02 ORL – THOMAS, Levon 8 yd kickoff return (FRANCE, Todd kick) – 21–21
- 00:33 NO – WIMPRINE, Danny 1 yd run (RUFFIN, J. kick failed) – 27–21 NO

3rd Quarter:

- 10:40 ORL – ARMSTRONG, Odie 3 yd run (FRANCE, Todd kick) – 28–27 ORL
- 07:53 NO – DUDLEY, Javarus 30 yd pass from WIMPRINE, Danny (RUFFIN, J. kick) – 34–28 NO
- 05:46 ORL – THOMAS, Levon 27 yd pass from STAFFORD, Shane (FRANCE, Todd kick) – 35–34 ORL
- 02:42 NO – ROSS, Isaiah 15 yd pass from WIMPRINE, Danny (BELLISARI, S. rush) – 42–35 NO

4th Quarter:

- 12:58 ORL – NICKERSON, K. 7 yd pass from STAFFORD, Shane (FRANCE, Todd kick) – 42–42
- 12:04 ORL – TEAM safety – 44–42 ORL
- 10:03 ORL – ARMSTRONG, Odie 25 yd run (FRANCE, Todd kick) – 51–42 ORL
- 07:33 NO – DUDLEY, Javarus 7 yd pass from WIMPRINE, Danny (RUFFIN, J. kick) – 51–49 ORL
- Officials: Referee: Tom McCabe; Umpire: Paul Frerking; Linesman: Allen Baynes; Line judge: Bob McKelwee; Back judge: Scott Helverson
- Offensive Player of the Game: Levon Thomas (ORL)
- Defensive Player of the Game: Jason Perry (ORL)
- Ironman Player of the Game: Odie Armstrong (ORL)

== Playoffs ==
=== National Conference Wild Card: at (4) Cleveland Gladiators ===
Quarter	1	2	3	4	Total
(5) ORL	20	13	20	13	66
(4) CLE	14	20	14	21	69

at Quicken Loans Arena, Cleveland, Ohio

- Date: June 30
- Game time: 7:00 PM EST
- Game attendance: 13,896

Game information

1st Quarter:

- 13:10 ORL – GESSNER 10 yd pass from STAFFORD (FRANTZ kick) – 7–0 ORL
- 11:28 CLE – REDD 25 yd pass from PHILYAW (BALL kick) – 7–7
- 07:51 ORL – GESSNER 24 yd pass from STAFFORD (FRANTZ kick) – 14–7 ORL
- 04:29 CLE – MARSHALL 15 yd pass from PHILYAW (BALL kick) – 14–14
- 03:35 ORL – TOLIVER 57 yd kickoff return (FRANTZ kick failed) – 20–14 ORL

2nd Quarter:

- 11:55 ORL – GESSNER 4 yd pass from STAFFORD (FRANTZ kick failed) – 26–14 ORL
- 07:14 CLE – HYMES 29 yd pass from PHILYAW (BALL kick) – 26–21 ORL
- 02:41 CLE – BALL 23 yd field goal – 26–24 ORL
- 01:20 ORL – ARMSTRONG 31 yd pass from STAFFORD (FRANTZ kick) – 33–24 ORL
- 00:38 CLE – REDD 29 yd pass from PHILYAW (BALL kick) – 33–31 ORL
- 00:00 CLE – BALL 27 yd field goal – 34–33 CLE

3rd Quarter:

- 13:16 CLE – REDD 26 yd pass from PHILYAW (BALL kick) – 41–33 CLE
- 12:32 ORL – TOLIVER 24 yd pass from STAFFORD (FRANTZ rush fumbled) – 41–39 CLE
- 09:19 CLE – HYMES 14 yd pass from PHILYAW (BALL kick) – 48–39 CLE
- 07:05 ORL – TOLIVER 25 yd pass from STAFFORD (FRANTZ kick) – 48–46 CLE
- 02:30 ORL – TOLIVER 29 yd pass from STAFFORD (FRANTZ kick) – 53–48 ORL

4th Quarter:

- 13:59 CLE – REDD 29 yd pass from PHILYAW (BALL kick) – 55–53 CLE
- 09:33 ORL – STAFFORD 6 yd run (FRANTZ kick) – 60–55 ORL
- 06:49 CLE – HYMES 15 yd pass from PHILYAW (BALL kick) – 62–60 CLE
- 00:52 CLE – MARSHALL 8 yd run (BALL kick) – 69–60 CLE
- 00:21 ORL – TOLIVER 3 yd pass from STAFFORD (STAFFORD pass failed) – 69–66 CLE
- Officials: Referee: Perry Havener; Umpire: Tom Laverty; Linesman: Allen Baynes; Line judge: Darrel Leftwich; Back judge: James DeBell
- Offensive Players of the Game: Raymond Philyaw (CLE); Robert Redd (CLE)
- Defensive Player of the Game: Brandon Hefflin (CLE)
- Ironman Player of the Game: Willis Marshall (CLE)
