= 2008 Tampa Bay Storm season =

Arena Football League team season

- Head coach: Tim Marcum
- Home stadium: St. Pete Times Forum

Results
- Record: 8–8
- Division place: 3rd
- Playoffs: Did not qualify

The 2008 Tampa Bay Storm season is the 22nd season for the American Arena Football League franchise, their 18th season in Tampa, Florida. The Storm were able to finish the season with an 8–8 record, but missed the playoffs due to losing a tiebreaker with the New Orleans VooDoo and New York Dragons, both teams finishing with the same record as the Storm. This was only the second time ever that the franchise had failed to make the playoffs, the first time being in 2006.

== Standings ==
Southern Division
Team	W	L	PCT	PF	PA	DIV	CON	Home	Away
y-Georgia Force	10	6	.625	927	848	3–3	6–4	6–2	4–4
x-Orlando Predators	9	7	.563	881	898	3–3	4–6	5–3	4–4
Tampa Bay Storm	8	8	.500	903	876	4–2	5–5	5–3	3–5
New Orleans VooDoo	8	8	.500	893	835	2–4	2–6	6–2	2–6

y - Clinched division
x - Clinched playoff berth

== Regular season schedule ==
Week	Date	Opponent	Result	Record	Location	Attendance	Recap
1	March 1	at Kansas City Brigade	W 51–49	1–0	Sprint Center	13,356	Recap
2	March 7	Georgia Force	W 69–48	2–0	St. Pete Times Forum	18,194	Recap
3	March 16	at New Orleans VooDoo	L 55–76	2–1	New Orleans Arena	13,011	Recap
4	Bye Week						
5	March 29	at Philadelphia Soul	L 51–59	2–2	Wachovia Center	16,179	Recap
6	April 5	at Columbus Destroyers	L 49–51	2–3	Nationwide Arena	14,256	Recap
7	April 13	Arizona Rattlers	L 62–63	2–4	St. Pete Times Forum	16,413	Recap
8	April 18	New York Dragons	L 47–66	2–5	St. Pete Times Forum	17,104	Recap
9	April 26	at Orlando Predators	W 48–41	3–5	Amway Arena	13,365	Recap
10	May 5	Chicago Rush	L 46–51	3–6	St. Pete Times Forum	14,491	Recap
11	May 9	New Orleans VooDoo	W 41–37	4–6	St. Pete Times Forum	16,934	Recap
12	May 16	at Grand Rapids Rampage	W 58–50	5–6	Van Andel Arena	7,205	Recap
13	May 23	Cleveland Gladiators	W 58–48	6–6	St. Pete Times Forum	15,976	Recap
14	May 31	at Georgia Force	L 55–56	6–7	The Arena at Gwinnett Center	10,400	Recap
15	June 7	Orlando Predators	W 71–61	7–7	St. Pete Times Forum	17,344	Recap
16	June 14	at San Jose SaberCats	L 70–73	7–8	HP Pavilion	14,042	Recap
17	June 21	Los Angeles Avengers	W 72–47	8–8	St. Pete Times Forum	17,891	Recap

== Roster ==
Uniform #	Player	Position	Height	Weight (lb)
1	Brett Dietz	QB	6' 4"	220
4	Seth Marler	K	6' 1"	195
5	Jeroid Johnson	DB	5' 10"	185
8	Tim McGill	DL	6 "3	310
10	Torrance Marshall	LB	6' 2"	260
11	Byron Jones	DB	5' 11"	180
14	Hank Edwards	WR	6' 2"	180
15	Stoney Case	QB	6' 4"	225
17	Terrill Shaw	WR	6' 0"	190
18	Sedrick Robinson	WR	5' 11"	180
21	Traco Rachal	DB	6' 2"	200
22	Lawrence Samuels	WR	6' 3"	220
26	Khalid Naziruddin	DB	5' 11"	185
27	Kevin Clemens	FB	6' 1"	285
32	Marvin Brown	LB	5' 11"	260
50	Kenyatta Jones	OL	6' 5"	300
65	Earnest Certain	OL/DL	6' 4"	300
66	Marcus Owen	OL	6' 3"	310
75	Tom Kaleita	OL	6' 5"	320
77	Emmanuel Akah	OL	6' 3"	315
90	Mark Word	DL	6' 5"	300
93	Tom Briggs	DL	6' 4"	280

== Regular season ==
=== Week 1: at Kansas City Brigade ===
Quarter	1	2	3	4	Total
TB	7	16	14	14	51
KC	7	21	7	14	49

at Sprint Center, Kansas City, Missouri

- Date: March 1
- Game time: 6:00 PM EST
- Game attendance: 13,356

Game information

1st Quarter:

- 11:23 TB – Torrance Marshall 3 yd run (Seth Marler kick) – 7–0 TB
- 6:11 KC – John Fitzgerald 4 yd run (Peter Martinez kick) – 7–7

2nd Quarter:

- 12:13 KC – Charles Frederick 5 yd pass from John Fitzgerald (Peter Martinez kick) – 14–7 KC
- 8:18 TB – Brett Dietz 1 yd run (Seth Marler kick) – 14–14
- 5:54 KC – Mike Horacek 40 yd pass from John Fitzgerald (Peter Martinez kick) – 21–14 KC
- 2:44 TB – Torrance Marshall 1 yd run (Seth Marler kick failed) – 21–20 KC
- 00:11 KC – Mike Horacek 21 yd pass from John Fitzgerald (Peter Martinez kick) – 28–21 KC
- 00:00 TB – Seth Marler 34 yd field goal – 28–23 KC

3rd Quarter:

- 13:14 TB – Torrance Marshall 3 yd run (Seth Marler kick) – 30–28 TB
- 7:36 KC – Charles Frederick 1 yd pass from John Fitzgerald (Peter Martinez kick) – 35–30 KC
- 4:17 TB – Torrance Marshall 1 yd run (Seth Marler kick) – 37–35 TB

4th Quarter:

- 13:09 TB – Tom Kaleita 7 yd pass from Brett Dietz (Seth Marler kick) – 44–35 TB
- 7:02 KC – John Fitzgerald 1 yd run (Peter Martinez kick) – 44–42 TB
- 6:03 TB – Sedrick Robinson 23 yd pass from Brett Dietz (Seth Marler kick) – 51–42 TB
- 2:59 KC – Mike Horacek 23 yd pass from John Fitzgerald (Peter Martinez kick) – 51–49 TB
- Officials: Pat Garvey; Umpire: Paul King; Linesman: Bill Ward; Line judge: Bob McElwee; Back judge: James DeBell
- Offensive Player of the Game: Torrance Marshall (TB)
- Defensive Player of the Game: Monty Montgomery (KC)
- Ironman Player of the Game: Torrance Marshall (TB)

=== Week 2: vs. Georgia Force ===
Quarter	1	2	3	4	Total
GA	7	13	14	14	48
TB	14	17	17	21	69

at St. Pete Times Forum, Tampa, Florida

- Date: March 7
- Game time: 7:30 PM EST
- Game attendance: 18194

Game information

1st Quarter:

- 9:34 TB – ROBINSON, Sedri 5 yd pass from DIETZ, Brett (MARLER, Seth kick) – 7–0 TB
- 4:02 GA – BERGERON, Troy 5 yd pass from GREISEN, Chris (MARTINEZ, Carlo kick) 7–7
- 00:30 TB – SHAW, Terrill 8 yd pass from DIETZ, Brett (MARLER, Seth kick) – 14–7 TB

2nd Quarter:

- 11:27 GA – MORRIS, Carl 3 yd pass from GREISEN, Chris (MARTINEZ, Carlo kick failed) – 14–13 TB
- 6:08 TB – MARLER, Seth 19 yd field goal – 17–13 TB
- 5:15 TB – ROBINSON, Sedri 6 yd net recovery (MARLER, Seth kick) – 24–13 TB
- 00:54 GA – GREISEN, Chris 1 yd run (MARTINEZ, Carlo kick) – 24–20 TB
- 00:43 TB – SHAW, Terrill 9 yd pass from DIETZ, Brett (MARLER, Seth kick) – 31–20 TB

3rd Quarter:

- 9:04 TB – EDWARDS, Hank 7 yd pass from DIETZ, Brett (MARLER, Seth kick) – 38–20 TB
- 7:21 GA – MORRIS, Carl 30 yd pass from GREISEN, Chris (MARTINEZ, Carlo kick) – 38–27 TB
- 3:10 TB – MARLER, Seth 24 yd field goal – 41–27 TB
- 2:15 TB – BRIGGS, Tom 1 yd interception return (MARLER, Seth kick) – 48–27 TB
- 00:06 GA – BERGERON, Troy 9 yd pass from GREISEN, Chris (MARTINEZ, Carlo kick) – 48–34 TB

4th Quarter:

- 12:32 TB – BROWN, Marvin 10 yd pass from DIETZ, Brett (MARLER, Seth kick) – 55–34 TB
- 8:25 GA – GREISEN, Chris 5 yd run (MARTINEZ, Carlo kick) – 55–41 TB
- 7:05 TB – ROBINSON, Sedri 9 yd pass from DIETZ, Brett (MARLER, Seth kick) – 62–41 TB
- 3:10 GA – MORRIS, Carl 13 yd pass from GREISEN, Chris (MARTINEZ, Carlo kick) – 62–48 TB
- 1:35 TB – EDWARDS, Hank 8 yd pass from DIETZ, Brett (MARLER, Seth kick) – 69–48 TB
- Officials: Referee: Dennis Lipski; Umpire: Rick Nelson; Linesman: Brent Durbin; Line judge: Darrel Leftwich; Back judge: Reggie Smith
- Offensive Player of the Game: Brett Dietz (TB)
- Defensive Player of the Game: Tom Briggs (TB)
- Ironman Player of the Game: Sedrick Robinson (TB)

=== Week 3: at New Orleans VooDoo ===
Quarter	1	2	3	4	Total
TB	14	0	14	27	55
NO	14	34	14	14	76

at New Orleans Arena, New Orleans, Louisiana

- Date: March 16
- Game time: 3:00 PM EST
- Game attendance: 13,011

Game information

1st Quarter:

- 09:24 NO – Dudley, Javarus 8 yd pass from Wimprine, Danny (Ruffin, Jonatha kick) – 7–0 NO
- 05:32 TB – Edwards, Hank 8 yd pass from Dietz, Brett (Marler, Seth kick) – 7–7
- 04:25 NO – Jordan, James 36 yd pass from Wimprine, Danny (Ruffin, Jonatha kick) – 14–7 NO
- 01:37 TB – Edwards, Hank 17 yd pass from Dietz, Brett (Marler, Seth kick) – 14–14

2nd Quarter:

- 13:42 NO – Jordan, James 33 yd pass from Wimprine, Danny (Ruffin, Jonatha kick) – 21–14 NO
- 11:30 NO – Shell, Lin-J 35 yd interception return (Ruffin, Jonatha kick) – 28–14 NO
- 02:33 NO – Sape, Lauvale 4 yd net recovery (Ruffin, Jonatha kick failed) – 34–14 NO
- 00:08 NO – Williams, Wenda 15 yd pass from Wimprine, Danny (Ruffin, Jonatha kick) – 41–14 NO
- 00:00 NO – Williams, Wenda 57 yd missed FG return (Ruffin, Jonatha kick) – 48–14 NO

3rd Quarter:

- 06:41 TB – Marshall, Torra 1 yd run (Marler, Seth kick) – 48–21 NO
- 05:13 NO – Jordan, James 10 yd pass from Wimprine, Danny (Ruffin, Jonatha kick) – 55–21 NO
- 01:20 NO – Dudley, Javarus 21 yd pass from Wimprine, Danny (Ruffin, Jonatha kick) – 62–21 NO
- 00:00 TB – Edwards, Hank 41 yd pass from Dietz, Brett (Marler, Seth kick) – 62–28 NO

4th Quarter:

- 11:09 TB – Edwards, Hank 15 yd pass from Dietz, Brett (Marler, Seth kick) – 62–35 NO
- 07:40 TB – Johnson, Jeroid 29 yd net recovery (Marler, Seth kick failed) – 62–41 NO
- 05:01 NO – Jordan, James 13 yd pass from Wimprine, Danny (Ruffin, Jonatha kick) – 69–41 NO
- 00:53 TB – Edwards, Hank 3 yd pass from Dietz, Brett (Marler, Seth kick) – 69–41 NO
- 00:48 NO – Lynch, James 7 yd run (Ruffin, Jonatha kick) – 76–48 NO
- 00:14 TB – Dietz, Brett 5 yd run (Marler, Seth kick) – 76–55 NO
- Officials: Referee: Bill McCabe; Umpire: Rick Podraza; Linesman: Rod Pearson; Line judge: Bob McElwee; Back judge: Scott Helverson
- Offensive Player of the Game: James Jordan (NO)
- Defensive Player of the Game: Michale Spicer (NO)
- Ironman Player of the Game: Wendall Williams (NO)

=== Week 4 ===
Bye Week

=== Week 5: at Philadelphia Soul ===
Quarter	1	2	3	4	Total
TB	14	9	14	14	51
PHI	13	12	14	20	59

at Wachovia Center, Philadelphia

- Date: March 29
- Game time: 2:00 PM EST
- Game attendance: 13,546

Game information

1st Quarter:

- 14:18 PHI – BRACKINS 37 yd pass from D'ORAZIO (HUGHES kick) – 7–0 PHI
- 12:04 TB – SAMUELS 15 yd pass from DIETZ (MARLER kick) – 7–7
- 05:03 TB – HOLMES 14 yd pass from DIETZ (MARLER kick) – 14–7 TB
- 02:27 PHI – D'ORAZIO 5 yd run (HUGHES kick failed) – 14–13 TB

2nd Quarter:

- 13:38 TB – MARLER 41 yd field goal – 17–13 TB
- 08:10 PHI – HUGHES 33 yd field goal – 17–16 TB
- 02:17 TB – SAUNDERS 2 yd pass from DIETZ (MARLER kick failed) – 23–16 TB
- 00:39 PHI – JACKSON 13 yd pass from D'ORAZIO (HUGHES kick failed)- 23–22 TB
- 00:00 PHI – HUGHES 32 yd field goal – 25–23 PHI

3rd Quarter:

- 13:22 TB – EDWARDS 39 yd pass from DIETZ (MARLER kick) – 30–25 TB
- 09:52 PHI – BRACKINS 8 yd pass from D'ORAZIO (HUGHES kick) – 32–30 PHI
- 07:56 PHI – JACKSON 14 yd pass from D'ORAZIO (HUGHES kick) – 39–30 PHI
- 02:07 TB – SAMUELS 28 yd pass from DIETZ (MARLER kick) – 39–37 PHI

4th Quarter:

- 10:52 PHI – BRACKINS 9 yd pass from D'ORAZIO (HUGHES kick) – 46–37 PHI
- 07:46 TB – MARSHALL 2 yd run (MARLER kick) – 46–44 PHI
- 06:08 PHI – WATTS 14 yd pass from D'ORAZIO (HUGHES kick failed) – 52–44 PHI
- 03:12 TB – SAMUELS 22 yd pass from DIETZ (MARLER kick) – 52–51 PHI
- 00:38 PHI – JACKSON 3 yd pass from D'ORAZIO (HUGHES kick) – 59–51 PHI
- Officials: Riley Johnson; Umpire: Rick Lowe; Linesman: Julian Mapp; Line judge: RG Detillier; Back judge: Bud McCleskey
- Offensive Player of the Game: Anthony Dunn (PHI)
- Defensive Player of the Game: Larry Brackins (PHI)
- Ironman Player of the Game: Mike Brown (PHI)

=== Week 6: at Columbus Destroyers ===
Quarter	1	2	3	4	Total
TB	14	7	7	21	49
CLB	7	14	3	27	51

at Nationwide Arena, Columbus, Ohio

- Date: April 5
- Game time: 7:00 PM EST
- Game attendance: 14,256

Game information

1st Quarter:

- 10:54 TB – Saunders, David 7 yd pass from Deitz, Brett (Marler, Seth kick) – 7–0 TB
- 05:16 CLB – LEE, Derek 3 yd pass from NAGY, Matt (LEWIS, Mark kick) – 7–7
- 02:30 TB – Edwards, Hank 5 yd pass from Deitz, Brett (Marler, Seth kick) – 14–7 TB

2nd Quarter:

- 13:22 CLB – LEE, Derek 8 yd pass from NAGY, Matt (LEWIS, Mark kick) – 14–14
- 10:28 TB – Edwards, Hank 10 yd pass from Deitz, Brett (Marler, Seth kick) – 21–14 TB
- 04:41 CLB – WELLS, Harold 4 yd pass from NAGY, Matt (LEWIS, Mark kick) – 21–21

3rd Quarter:

- 11:15 CLB – LEWIS, Mark 21 yd field goal – 24–21 CLB
- 05:27 TB – Kaleita, Tom 2 yd pass from Deitz, Brett (Marler, Seth kick) – 28–24 TB

4th Quarter:

- 14:55 CLB – LEE, Derek 15 yd pass from NAGY, Matt (LEWIS, Mark kick) – 31–28 CLB
- 09:34 TB – Brown, Marvin 7 yd run (Marler, Seth kick) – 35–31 TB
- 06:37 CLB – LEE, Derek 4 yd pass from NAGY, Matt (LEWIS, Mark kick failed) – 37–35 CLB
- 00:45 CLB – RUSSELL, Calvin 33 yd pass from NAGY, Matt (LEWIS, Mark kick) – 44–35 CLB
- 00:24 TB – Saunders, David 22 yd pass from Deitz, Brett (Marler, Seth kick) – 44–42 CLB
- 00:20 CLB – COGGINS, Nate 8 yd kickoff return (LEWIS, Mark kick) – 51–42 CLB
- 00:00 TB – Saunders, David 9 yd pass from Deitz, Brett (Marler, Seth kick) – 51–49 CLB
- Officials: Referee: Riley Johnson; Umpire: Paul Frerking; Linesman: Neil Brunner; Line judge: Paul Engelberts; Back judge: Tony Lombardo
- Offensive Player of the Game: N/A
- Defensive Player of the Game: N/A
- Ironman Player of the Game: N/A

=== Week 7: vs. Arizona Rattlers ===
Quarter	1	2	3	4	Total
ARZ	13	14	7	29	63
TB	14	21	13	14	62

at St. Pete Times Forum, Tampa, Florida

- Date: April 13
- Game time: 2:00 PM EST
- Game attendance: 16,413

Game information

1st Quarter:

- 11:00 ARZ – DEVOE, Todd 5 yd pass from CAMPBELL, Lang (HOULE, Eric kick) – 7–0 ARZ
- 09:33 TB – EDWARDS, Hank 35 yd pass from DIETZ, Brett (MARLER, Seth kick) – 7–7
- 04:35 ARZ – BURLEY, Siaha 27 yd pass from CAMPBELL, Lang (HOULE, Eric kick failed) – 13–7 ARZ
- 01:03 TB – DIETZ, Brett 3 yd run (MARLER, Seth kick) – 14–13 TB

2nd Quarter:

- 13:40 ARZ – BURLEY, Siaha 27 yd pass from CAMPBELL, Lang (ROBINSON, Chris rush) – 21–14 ARZ
- 09:55 TB – HOLMES, Brent 4 yd pass from DIETZ, Brett (MARLER, Seth kick) – 21–21
- 01:24 TB – MARSHALL, Torra 44 yd pass from DIETZ, Brett (MARLER, Seth kick) – 28–21 TB
- 00:38 ARZ – HARVEY, Trandon 5 yd pass from CAMPBELL, Lang (HOULE, Eric kick failed) – 28–27 TB
- 00:01 TB – SAMUELS, Lawren 5 yd pass from DIETZ, Brett (MARLER, Seth kick) – 35–27 TB

3rd Quarter:

- 11:02 TB – DIETZ, Brett 18 yd run (MARLER, Seth kick failed) – 41–27 TB
- 05:18 ARZ – HARVEY, Trandon 13 yd pass from CAMPBELL, Lang (HOULE, Eric kick) – 41–34 TB
- 01:26 TB – MARSHALL, Torra 1 yd run (MARLER, Seth kick) – 48–34 TB

4th Quarter:

- 14:52 ARZ – HARVEY, Trandon 20 yd pass from CAMPBELL, Lang (HOULE, Eric kick) – 48–41 TB
- 13:43 ARZ – FAOA, Asi 0 yd net recovery (HOULE, Eric kick) – 48–48
- 10:26 TB – EDWARDS, Hank 29 yd pass from DIETZ, Brett (MARLER, Seth kick) – 55–48 TB
- 03:00 ARZ – BURLEY, Siaha 4 yd pass from CAMPBELL, Lang (HOULE, Eric kick) – 55–55
- 00:29 TB – EDWARDS, Hank 19 yd pass from DIETZ, Brett (MARLER, Seth kick) – 62–55 TB
- 00:03 ARZ – BURLEY, Siaha 9 yd pass from CAMPBELL, Lang (GAINES, Wendall rush) – 63–62 ARZ
- Officials: Referee: Perry Havener; Umpire: Paul Frerking; Linesman: Kavin McGrath; Line judge: David Meslow; Back judge: Keith Washington
- Offensive Player of the Game: Brett Dietz (TB)
- Defensive Player of the Game: Kelvin Kinney (TB)
- Ironman Player of the Game: Torrance Marshall (TB)

=== Week 8: vs. New York Dragons ===
Quarter	1	2	3	4	Total
NY	10	23	12	21	66
TB	14	13	7	13	47

at St. Pete Times Forum, Tampa, Florida

- Date: April 18
- Game time: 7:30 PM EST
- Game attendance: 17,104

Game information

1st Quarter:

- 10:28 TB – MARSHALL, Torra 1 yd run (MARLER, Seth kick) – 7–0 TB
- 07:41 NY – ANTHONY, Chris 7 yd pass from GARCIA, Aaron (ONORATO, Chris kick) – 7–7
- 04:30 NY – ONORATO, Chris 19 yd field goal – 10–7 NY
- 01:45 TB – SHAW, Terrill 6 yd pass from DIETZ, Brett (MARLER, Seth kick) – 14–10 TB

2nd Quarter:

- 13:40 NY – SEIFERT, Elliot 11 yd pass from GARCIA, Aaron (ONORATO, Chris kick) – 17–14 NY
- 07:13 NY – SWAYNE, Kevin 22 yd pass from GARCIA, Aaron (ONORATO, Chris kick failed) – 23–14 NY
- 05:18 TB – SHAW, Terrill 27 yd pass from DIETZ, Brett (MARLER, Seth kick failed) – 23–20 NY
- 03:24 NY – WILLIS, Jason 8 yd pass from GARCIA, Aaron (ONORATO, Chris kick) – 30–20 NY
- 00:08 TB – EDWARDS, Hank 5 yd pass from DIETZ, Brett (MARLER, Seth kick) – 30–27 NY
- 00:00 NY – ONORATO, Chris 42 yd field goal – 33–27 NY

3rd Quarter:

- 09:38 NY – ONORATO, Chris 38 yd field goal – 36–27 NY
- 08:51 NY – ADELEKAN, Farou safety – 38–27 NY
- 04:24 NY – WILLIS, Jason 4 yd pass from GARCIA, Aaron (ONORATO, Chris kick) – 45–27 NY
- 02:20 TB – EDWARDS, Hank 5 yd pass from DIETZ, Brett (MARLER, Seth kick) – 45–34 NY

4th Quarter:

- 14:55 NY – ANTHONY, Chris 23 yd pass from GARCIA, Aaron (ONORATO, Chris kick) – 52–34 NY
- 09:46 TB – SAUNDERS, David 3 yd pass from DIETZ, Brett (MARLER, Seth kick failed) – 52–40 NY
- 08:28 NY – SWAYNE, Kevin 5 yd pass from GARCIA, Aaron (ONORATO, Chris kick) – 59–40 NY
- 04:41 NY – NIX, John 20 yd fumble recovery (ONORATO, Chris kick) – 66–40 NY
- 01:25 TB – SAMUELS, Lawren 16 yd pass from DIETZ, Brett (MARLER, Seth kick) – 66–47 NY
- Officials: Referee: Bill LeMonnier; Umpire: Jeff Carr; Linesman: Greg Shields; Line judge: Dave Chesney; Back judge: Billy Beckett
- Offensive Player of the Game: Aaron Garcia (NY)
- Defensive Player of the Game: Billy Parker (NY)
- Ironman Player of the Game: Chris Anthony (NY)

=== Week 9: at Orlando Predators ===
Quarter	1	2	3	4	Total
TB	7	17	14	10	48
ORL	7	7	14	13	41

at Amway Arena, Orlando, Florida

- Date: April 26
- Game time: 7:30 PM EST
- Game attendance: 13,365

Game information

1st Quarter:

- 07:40 ORL – TOLIVER, T.T. 8 yd pass from STAFFORD, Shane (VAUGHN, John kick) – 7–0 ORL
- 03:14 TB – SAMUELS, L. 6 yd pass from DIETZ, Brett (MARLER, Seth kick) – 7–7

2nd Quarter:

- 12:08 ORL – STAFFORD, Shane 1 yd run (VAUGHN, John kick) – 14–7 ORL
- 07:18 TB – EDWARDS, Hank 3 yd pass from DIETZ, Brett (MARLER, Seth kick) – 14–14
- 02:00 TB – MARLER, Seth 32 yd field goal – 17–14 TB
- 01:19 TB – BRIGGS, Tom 3 yd interception return (MARLER, Seth kick) – 24–14 TB

3rd Quarter:

- 13:30 ORL – GESSNER, Chas 13 yd pass from STAFFORD, Shane (VAUGHN, John kick) – 24–21 TB
- 08:07 TB – MARSHALL, T. 2 yd run (MARLER, Seth kick) – 31–21 TB
- 05:06 ORL – JAHNKE, Chris 11 yd pass from STAFFORD, Shane (VAUGHN, John kick) – 31–28 TB
- 00:52 TB – MARSHALL, T. 1 yd run (MARLER, Seth kick) – 38–28 TB

4th Quarter:

- 14:18 TB – SAMUELS, L. 8 yd interception return (MARLER, Seth kick) – 45–28 TB
- 09:38 TB – MARLER, Seth 29 yd field goal – 48–28 TB
- 07:24 ORL – GESSNER, Chas 5 yd pass from STAFFORD, Shane (VAUGHN, John kick blocked) – 48–34 TB
- 03:02 ORL – TOLIVER, T.T. 8 yd pass from STAFFORD, Shane (VAUGHN, John kick) – 48–41 TB
- Officials: Referee: Bill Athan; Umpire: Matt Jordan; Linesman: Allen Baynes; Line judge: Rusty Baynes; Back judge: Greg Wilson
- Offensive Player of the Game: Chas Gessner (ORL)
- Defensive Player of the Game: Traco Rachal (TB)
- Ironman Player of the Game: Lawrence Samuels (TB)

=== Week 10: vs. Chicago Rush ===
Quarter	1	2	3	4	Total
CHI	7	17	13	14	51
TB	7	17	6	16	46

at St. Pete Times Forum, Tampa, Florida

- Date: May 5
- Game time: 8:00 PM EST
- Game attendance: 14,491

Game information

1st Quarter:

- 10:53 TB – SAMUELS, Lawren 14 yd pass from DIETZ, Brett (MARLER, Seth kick) – 7–0 TB
- 05:45 CHI – ALEXANDER, Dan 2 yd run (FRANTZ, Dan kick) – 7–7

2nd Quarter:

- 12:37 TB – MARLER, Seth 22 yd field goal – 10–7 TB
- 11:34 CHI – LA TENDRESSE, T 29 yd pass from MICHNA, Russ (FRANTZ, Dan kick) – 14–10 CHI
- 08:18 TB – SAMUELS, Lawren 16 yd pass from DIETZ, Brett (MARLER, Seth kick) – 17–14 TB
- 06:21 CHI – LA TENDRESSE, T 7 yd pass from MICHNA, Russ (FRANTZ, Dan kick) – 21–17 CHI
- 00:40 TB – MARSHALL, Torra 7 yd fumble recovery (MARLER, Seth kick) – 24–21 TB
- 00:00 CHI – FRANTZ, Dan 26 yd field goal – 24–24

3rd Quarter:

- 10:24 CHI – LA TENDRESSE, T 8 yd pass from MICHNA, Russ (FRANTZ, Dan kick) – 31–24 CHI
- 08:40 CHI – MICHNA, Russ 25 yd run (FRANTZ, Dan kick failed) – 37–24 CHI
- 06:33 TB – MARSHALL, Torra 2 yd run (MARLER, Seth kick failed) – 37–30 CHI

4th Quarter:

- 09:25 TB – MARLER, Seth 20 yd field goal – 37–33 CHI
- 08:47 CHI – HARRELL, Damian 11 yd pass from MICHNA, Russ (FRANTZ, Dan kick) – 44–33 CHI
- 02:47 TB – MARSHALL, Torra 1 yd run (MARLER, Seth kick failed) – 44–39 CHI
- 00:54 CHI – MICHNA, Russ 6 yd run (FRANTZ, Dan kick) – 51–39 CHI
- 00:28 TB – ROBINSON, Sedri 5 yd pass from DIETZ, Brett (MARLER, Seth kick) – 51–46 CHI
- Officials: Referee: Tom McCabe; Umpire: Rick Podraza; Linesman: Rod Pearson; Line judge: Dana McKenzie; Back judge: Scott Helverson
- Offensive Player of the Game: Travis Latendresse (CHI)
- Defensive Player of the Game: Torrance Marshall (TB)
- Ironman Player of the Game: Lawrence Samuels (TB)

=== Week 11: vs. New Orleans VooDoo ===
Quarter	1	2	3	4	Total
NO	6	10	7	14	37
TB	14	7	7	13	41

at St. Pete Times Forum, Tampa, Florida

- Date: May 9
- Game time: 7:30 PM EST
- Game attendance: 16,934

Game information

1st Quarter:

- 13:15 TB – SAMUELS, Lawren 5 yd pass from DIETZ, Brett (MARLER, Seth kick) – 7–0 TB
- 08:13 NO – RUBIN, DeAndrew 13 yd pass from WIMPRINE, Danny (RUFFIN, Johnath kick failed) – 7–6 TB
- 03:50 TB – MARSHALL, Torra 2 yd run (MARLER, Seth kick) – 14–6 TB

2nd Quarter:

- 13:20 NO – KEY, Sale 4 yd pass from WIMPRINE, Danny (RUFFIN, Johnath kick) – 14–13 TB
- 10:47 TB – EDWARDS, Hank 11 yd pass from DIETZ, Brett (MARLER, Seth kick) – 21–13 TB
- 00:01 NO – RUFFIN, Johnath 36 yd field goal – 21–16 TB

3rd Quarter:

- 10:21 TB – MARSHALL, Torra 5 yd run (MARLER, Seth kick) – 28–16 TB
- 03:22 NO – LYNCH, James 1 yd run (RUFFIN, Johnath kick) – 28–23 TB

4th Quarter:

- 14:54 NO – DUDLEY, Javarus 43 yd pass from WIMPRINE, Danny (RUFFIN, Johnath kick) – 30–28 NO
- 13:15 TB – SAMUELS, Lawren 37 yd pass from DIETZ, Brett (MARLER, Seth kick failed) – 34–20 TB
- 06:20 NO – WILLIAMS, Wende 2 yd run (RUFFIN, Johnath kick) – 37–34 NO
- 00:55 TB – SHAW, Terrill 16 yd pass from DIETZ, Brett (MARLER, Seth kick) – 41–37 TB
- Officials: Referee: Dennis Lipski; Umpire: Wes Fritz; Linesman: Neil Brunner; Line judge: Paul Engelberts; Back judge: Tony Lombardo
- Offensive Player of the Game: Lawrence Samuels (TB)
- Defensive Player of the Game: Justin Brown (NO)
- Ironman Player of the Game: Torrance Marshall (TB)

=== Week 12: at Grand Rapids Rampage ===
Quarter	1	2	3	4	Total
TB	7	28	20	3	58
GR	21	7	14	8	50

at Van Andel Arena, Grand Rapids, Michigan

- Date: May 16
- Game time: 7:00 PM EST
- Game attendance: 7,205

Game information

1st Quarter:

- 10:30 GR – JOHNSON 10 yd pass from MACPHERSON (GOWINS kick) – 7–0 GR
- 07:08 TB – MARSHALL 1 yd run (MARLER kick) – 7–7
- 05:12 GR – MAGNER 10 yd pass from MACPHERSON (GOWINS kick) – 14–7 GR
- 01:22 GR – JOHNSON 6 yd pass from MACPHERSON (GOWINS kick) – 21–7 GR

2nd Quarter:

- 12:05 TB – EDWARDS 13 yd pass from DIETZ (MARLER kick) – 21–14 GR
- 09:53 TB – SHAW 30 yd pass from DIETZ (MARLER kick) – 21–21
- 08:11 TB – RACHAL 3 yd net recovery (MARLER kick) – 28–21 TB
- 04:09 GR – JOHNSON 10 yd pass from MACPHERSON (GOWINS kick) – 28–28
- 00:16 TB – EDWARDS 3 yd pass from DIETZ (MARLER kick) – 35–28 TB

3rd Quarter:

- 14:02 TB – SAMUELS 11 yd pass from DIETZ (MARLER kick) – 42–28 TB
- 11:56 GR – MAGNER 23 yd pass from MACPHERSON (GOWINS kick) – 42–35 TB
- 09:04 TB – MARSHALL 3 yd run (MARLER kick failed) – 48–35 TB
- 06:03 GR – HIGGINS 14 yd pass from MACPHERSON (GOWINS kick) – 48–42 TB
- 04:17 TB – ROBINSON 34 yd pass from DIETZ (MARLER kick) – 55–42 TB

4th Quarter:

- 01:46 TB – MARLER 18 yd field goal – 58–42 TB
- 00:20 GR – BROWDEN 3 yd run (HIGGINS pass from MACPHERSON) – 58–50 TB
- Officials: Referee: Dave Cutaia; Umpire: Al Granado; Linesman: Shawn Hochuli; Line judge: Paul Engelberts; Back judge: James Cole
- Offensive Player of the Game: Cole Magner (GR)
- Defensive Player of the Game: Traco Rachal (TB)
- Ironman Player of the Game: Lawrence Samuels (TB)

=== Week 13: vs. Cleveland Gladiators ===
Quarter	1	2	3	4	Total
CLE	19	7	7	15	48
TB	14	14	6	24	58

at St. Pete Times Forum, Tampa, Florida

- Date: May 23
- Game time: 7:30 PM EST
- Game attendance: 15,976

Game information

1st Quarter:

- 13:11 TB – SHAW, Terrill 9 yd pass from DIETZ, Brett (MARLER, Seth kick) – 7–0 TB
- 09:25 CLE – AMEY, Otis 8 yd pass from PHILYAW, Raymon (BALL, Jason kick failed) – 7–6 TB
- 06:48 TB – SHAW, Terrill 29 yd pass from DIETZ, Brett (MARLER, Seth kick) – 14–6 TB
- 03:05 CLE – MARSHALL, Willi 8 yd run (BALL, Jason kick) – 14–13 TB
- 02:10 CLE – REDD, Robert 2 yd net recovery (BALL, Jason kick blocked) – 19–14 CLE

2nd Quarter:

- 09:21 CLE – JACKSON, Marlio 3 yd run (BALL, Jason kick) – 26–14 CLE
- 03:35 TB – TIMMONS, Tyrone 4 yd pass from DIETZ, Brett (MARLER, Seth kick) – 26–21 CLE
- 00:21 TB – TIMMONS, Tyrone 9 yd pass from DIETZ, Brett (MARLER, Seth kick) – 28–26 CLE

3rd Quarter:

- 10:57 CLE – JACKSON, Marlio 1 yd run (BALL, Jason kick) – 33–28 CLE
- 02:51 TB – MARSHALL, Torra 2 yd run (CASE, Stoney rush failed) – 34–33 TB

4th Quarter:

- 13:45 TB – SHAW, Terrill 15 yd pass from DIETZ, Brett (MARLER, Seth kick) – 41–33 TB
- 11:51 CLE – AMEY, Otis 14 yd pass from PHILYAW, Raymon (MARSHALL, Willi pass from PHILYAW, Raymon) – 41–41
- 06:43 TB – MARSHALL, Torra 2 yd run (MARLER, Seth kick) – 48–41 TB
- 04:21 TB – TIMMONS, Tyrone 8 yd pass from DIETZ, Brett (MARLER, Seth kick) – 55–41 TB
- 01:23 CLE – MARSHALL, Willi 8 yd pass from PHILYAW, Raymon (BALL, Jason kick) – 55–48 TB
- 00:13 TB – MARLER, Seth 23 yd field goal – 58–48 TB
- Officials: Referee: Riley Johnson; Umpire: Rick Lowe; Linesman: Julian Mapp; Line judge: RG Detillier; Back judge: Bud McClesky
- Offensive Player of the Game: Tyrone Timmons (TB)
- Defensive Player of the Game: Tim McGill (TB)
- Ironman Player of the Game: Lawrence Samuels (TB)

=== Week 14: at Georgia Force ===
Quarter	1	2	3	4	Total
TB	13	14	14	14	55
GA	14	14	0	28	56

at The Arena at Gwinnett Center, Duluth, Georgia

- Date: May 31
- Game time: 7:00 PM EST
- Game attendance: 10,400

Game information

1st Quarter:

- 11:12 TB – MARSHALL, Torra 1 yd run (MARLER, Seth kick) – 7–0 TB
- 08:32 GA – MORRIS, Carl 31 yd pass from GREISEN, Chris (MARTINEZ, Carlo kick) – 7–7
- 04:20 TB – MARSHALL, Torra 3 yd run (MARLER, Seth kick failed) – 13–7 TB
- 01:29 GA – MORRIS, Carl 14 yd pass from GREISEN, Chris (MARTINEZ, Carlo kick) – 14–13 GA

2nd Quarter:

- 12:51 GA – HUEBNER, Matt 1 yd run (MARTINEZ, Carlo kick) – 21–13 GA
- 08:03 TB – MARSHALL, Torra 4 yd run (MARLER, Seth kick)- 21–20 GA
- 02:40 GA – MORRIS, Carl 7 yd pass from GREISEN, Chris (MARTINEZ, Carlo kick) – 28–20 GA
- 00:01 TB – TIMMONS, Tyrone 2 yd pass from DIETZ, Brett (MARLER, Seth kick) – 28–27 GA

3rd Quarter:

- 13:40 TB – SHAW, Terrill 37 yd pass from DIETZ, Brett (MARLER, Seth kick) – 34–28 TB
- 04:14 TB – TIMMONS, Tyrone 22 yd pass from DIETZ, Brett (MARLER, Seth kick) – 41–28 TB

4th Quarter:

- 13:09 GA – HUEBNER, Matt 3 yd run (MARTINEZ, Carlo kick) – 41–35 TB
- 08:59 TB – TIMMONS, Tyrone 15 yd pass from DIETZ, Brett (MARLER, Seth kick) – 48–35 TB
- 06:04 GA – JONES, Tiger 9 yd pass from GREISEN, Chris (MARTINEZ, Carlo kick) – 48–42 TB
- 04:27 TB – MARSHALL, Torra 4 yd run (MARLER, Seth kick) – 55–42 TB
- 01:34 GA – HUEBNER, Matt 1 yd run (MARTINEZ, Carlo kick) – 55–49 TB
- 00:00 GA – GREISEN, Chris 1 yd run (MARTINEZ, Carlo kick) – 56–55 GA
- Officials: Referee: Perry Havener; Umpire: Tom Laverty; Linesman: Allen Baynes; Line judge: David Meslow; Back judge: Keith Washington
- Offensive Player of the Game: Carl Morris (GA)
- Defensive Player of the Game: Traco Rachal (TB)
- Ironman Player of the Game: Matt Huebner (GA)

=== Week 15: vs. Orlando Predators ===
Quarter	1	2	3	4	Total
ORL	12	20	7	22	61
TB	21	21	15	14	71

at St. Pete Times Forum, Tampa, Florida

- Date: June 7
- Game time: 7:30 PM EST
- Game attendance: 17,344

Game information

1st Quarter:

- 13:48 TB – EDWARDS, Hank 28 yd pass from DIETZ, Brett (MARLER, Seth kick) – 7–0 TB
- 09:29 ORL – THOMAS, Levon 16 yd pass from STAFFORD, Shane (FRANTZ, Dan kick failed) – 7–6 TB
- 05:04 TB – BRIGGS, Tom 4 yd pass from DIETZ, Brett (MARLER, Seth kick) – 14–6 TB
- 03:07 ORL – MOHRING, John 36 yd pass from STAFFORD, Shane (FRANTZ, Dan kick failed) – 14–12 TB
- 00:11 TB – MARSHALL, Torra 2 yd run (MARLER, Seth kick) – 21–12 TB

2nd Quarter:

- 11:57 ORL – THOMAS, Levon 24 yd pass from STAFFORD, Shane (FRANTZ, Dan kick failed) – 21–18 TB
- 07:52 TB – TIMMONS, Tyrone 19 yd pass from DIETZ, Brett (MARLER, Seth kick) – 28–18 TB
- 02:33 ORL – MOYE-MOORE, Mar 2 yd run (FRANTZ, Dan kick) – 28–25 TB
- 00:42 TB – EDWARDS, Hank 4 yd pass from DIETZ, Brett (MARLER, Seth kick) – 35–25 TB
- 00:05 ORL – NICKERSON, Kevi 4 yd pass from STAFFORD, Shane (FRANTZ, Dan kick) – 35–32 TB
- 00:00 TB – ROBINSON, Sedri 58 yd kickoff return (MARLER, Seth kick) – 42–32 TB

3rd Quarter:

- 13:58 TB – EDWARDS, Hank 22 yd pass from DIETZ, Brett (MARLER, Seth kick failed) – 48–32 TB
- 12:12 TB – TEAM safety – 50–32 TB
- 08:51 ORL – TOLIVER, T.T. 27 yd pass from STAFFORD, Shane (FRANTZ, Dan kick) – 50–39 TB
- 02:13 TB – TIMMONS, Tyrone 8 yd pass from DIETZ, Brett (MARLER, Seth kick) – 57–39 TB

4th Quarter:

- 13:53 ORL – TOLIVER, T.T. 4 yd pass from STAFFORD, Shane (FRANTZ, Dan kick failed) – 57–45 TB
- 10:44 TB – EDWARDS, Hank 16 yd pass from DIETZ, Brett (MARLER, Seth kick) – 64–45 TB
- 07:01 ORL – ARMSTRONG, Odie 11 yd pass from STAFFORD, Shane (ARMSTRONG, Odie pass from STAFFORD, Shane) – 64–53 TB
- 05:11 TB – TIMMONS, Tyrone 7 yd pass from DIETZ, Brett (MARLER, Seth kick) – 71–53 TB
- 01:51 ORL – THOMAS, Levon 5 yd pass from STAFFORD, Shane (ARMSTRONG, Odie rush) – 71–61 TB
- Officials: Referee: Dennis Lipski; Umpire: Al Granado; Linesman: Mike McCabe; Line judge: Art Lucky; Back judge: James Cole
- Offensive Player of the Game: Hank Edwards (TB)
- Defensive Player of the Game: Traco Rachal (TB)
- Ironman Player of the Game: Sedrick Robinson (TB)

=== Week 16: at San Jose SaberCats ===
Quarter	1	2	3	4	Total
TB	14	21	7	28	70
SJ	7	31	14	21	73

at HP Pavilion at San Jose, San Jose, California

- Date: June 14
- Game time: 10:30 PM EST
- Game attendance: 14,042

Game information

1st Quarter:

- 13:50 TB – TIMMONS, Tyrone 13 yd pass from DIETZ, Brett (MARLER, Seth kick) – 7–0 TB
- 09:30 SJ – SAINTIL, Cleann 11 yd pass from GRIEB, Mark (HAGLUND, A.J. kick) – 7–7
- 02:31 TB – EDWARDS, Hank 21 yd pass from DIETZ, Brett (MARLER, Seth kick) – 14–7 TB

2nd Quarter:

- 12:48 SJ – ROE, James 3 yd pass from GRIEB, Mark (HAGLUND, A.J. kick) – 14–14
- 11:15 SJ – WATSON, Steve 0 yd fumble recovery (HAGLUND, A.J. kick) – 21–14 SJ
- 06:42 TB – EDWARDS, Hank 16 yd pass from DIETZ, Brett (MARLER, Seth kick) – 21–21
- 04:12 SJ – WRIGHT, Rodney 7 yd pass from GRIEB, Mark (HAGLUND, A.J. kick) – 28–21 SJ
- 01:01 TB – EDWARDS, Hank 9 yd pass from DIETZ, Brett (MARLER, Seth kick) – 28–28
- 00:40 SJ – ROE, James 12 yd pass from GRIEB, Mark (HAGLUND, A.J. kick) – 35–28 SJ
- 00:33 TB – EDWARDS, Hank 47 yd pass from DIETZ, Brett (MARLER, Seth kick) – 35–35
- 00:00 SJ – HAGLUND, A.J. 18 yd field goal – 38–35 SJ

3rd Quarter:

- 14:28 SJ – WRIGHT, Rodney 31 yd pass from GRIEB, Mark (HAGLUND, A.J. kick) – 45–35 SJ
- 06:47 TB – EDWARDS, Hank 14 yd pass from DIETZ, Brett (MARLER, Seth kick) – 45–42 SJ
- 00:42 SJ – SAINTIL, Cleann 4 yd pass from GRIEB, Mark (HAGLUND, A.J. kick) – 52–42 SJ

4th Quarter:

- 13:49 TB – TIMMONS, Tyrone 12 yd pass from DIETZ, Brett (MARLER, Seth kick) – 52–49 SJ
- 10:03 SJ – SAINTIL, Cleann 6 yd pass from GRIEB, Mark (HAGLUND, A.J. kick) – 59–49 SJ
- 07:35 SJ – SAINTIL, Cleann 6 yd pass from GRIEB, Mark (HAGLUND, A.J. kick) – 66–49 SJ
- 05:11 TB – SAMUELS, Lawren 7 yd pass from DIETZ, Brett (MARLER, Seth kick) – 66–56 SJ
- 04:23 SJ – ROE, James 7 yd pass from GRIEB, Mark (HAGLUND, A.J. kick) – 73–56 SJ
- 00:51 TB – SAMUELS, Lawren 4 yd pass from DIETZ, Brett (MARLER, Seth kick) – 73–63 SJ
- 00:07 TB – SAMUELS, Lawren 7 yd pass from DIETZ, Brett (MARLER, Seth kick) – 73–70 SJ
- Officials: Referee: Bill LeMonier; Umpire: Jeff Carr; Linesman: Greg Shields; Line judge: Dave Chesney; Back judge: Billy Beckett
- Offensive Player of the Game: Mark Grieb (SJ)
- Defensive Player of the Game: Clevan Thomas (SJ)
- Ironman Player of the Game: Lawrence Samuels (TB)

=== Week 17: vs. Los Angeles Avengers ===
Quarter	1	2	3	4	Total
LA	0	20	13	14	47
TB	20	21	21	10	72

at St. Pete Times Forum, Tampa, Florida

- Date: June 21
- Game time: 7:30 PM EST
- Game attendance: 17,981

Game information

1st Quarter:

- 11:06 TB – ROBINSON, Sedri 6 yd run (MARLER, Seth kick failed) – 6–0 TB
- 02:07 TB – EDWARDS, Hank 23 yd pass from DIETZ, Brett (MARLER, Seth kick) – 13–0 TB
- 00:06 TB – GLOVER, Phil 1 yd run (MARLER, Seth kick) – 20–0 TB

2nd Quarter:

- 13:07 LA – MARSHALL, Timon 22 yd pass from CUMBIE, Sonny (FREDRICKSON, Ty kick) – 20–7 TB
- 08:13 TB – EDWARDS, Hank 10 yd pass from DIETZ, Brett (MARLER, Seth kick) – 27–7 TB
- 07:00 LA – TOLVER, J.R. 37 yd pass from CUMBIE, Sonny (FREDRICKSON, Ty kick) – 27–14 TB
- 04:34 TB – TIMMONS, Tyrone 21 yd pass from DIETZ, Brett (MARLER, Seth kick) – 34–14 TB
- 02:12 LA – STUBBS, Terranc 13 yd pass from CUMBIE, Sonny (FREDRICKSON, Ty kick failed) – 34–20 TB
- 00:07 TB – SAMUELS, Lawren 7 yd pass from DIETZ, Brett (MARLER, Seth kick) – 41–20 TB

3rd Quarter:

- 11:44 TB – SAMUELS, Lawren 5 yd pass from DIETZ, Brett (MARLER, Seth kick) – 48–20 TB
- 06:45 LA – TOLVER, J.R. 4 yd pass from CUMBIE, Sonny (FREDRICKSON, Ty kick) – 48–27 TB
- 03:08 TB – GLOVER, Phil 1 yd run (MARLER, Seth kick) – 55–27 TB
- 01:55 TB – GLOVER, Phil 1 yd run (MARLER, Seth kick) – 62–27 TB
- 00:18 LA – MARSHALL, Timon 37 yd pass from CUMBIE, Sonny (FREDRICKSON, Ty kick failed) – 62–33 TB

4th Quarter:

- 10:43 TB – TIMMONS, Tyrone 27 yd pass from DIETZ, Brett (MARLER, Seth kick) – 69–33 TB
- 08:27 LA – MARSHALL, Timon 9 yd pass from CUMBIE, Sonny (FREDRICKSON, Ty kick) – 69–40 TB
- 00:54 TB – MARLER, Seth 27 yd field goal – 72–40 TB
- 00:38 LA – MARSHALL, Timon 28 yd pass from KELLER, Sam (FREDRICKSON, Ty kick) – 72–47 TB
- Officials: Referee: Bill McCabe; Umpire: Mike Delaney; Linesman: Shawn Hochuli; Line judge: Dirk Bell; Back judge: Jimmy Buchanan
- Offensive Player of the Game: Brett Dietz (TB)
- Defensive Player of the Game: Traco Rachal (TB)
- Ironman Player of the Game: Lawrence Samuels (TB)
