= 2008 New Orleans VooDoo season =

Arena Football League team season

- Owner: Tom Benson
- Head coach: Mike Neu
- Home stadium: New Orleans Arena

Results
- Record: 8–8
- Division place: 4th
- Playoffs: Did not qualify

The 2008 New Orleans VooDoo season is the fourth and final season for the franchise. The Voodoo started the season with a 7–2 record, but lost 6 of their last 7 games, finishing with an 8–8 record. This caused them to miss the playoffs, losing a tiebreaker scenario with the New York Dragons who had finished with the same record, and had defeated the VooDoo in the regular season. The team folded 4 months later, but will return in 2011.

== Standings ==
Southern Division
Team	W	L	PCT	PF	PA	DIV	CON	Home	Away
y-Georgia Force	10	6	.625	927	848	3–3	6–4	6–2	4–4
x-Orlando Predators	9	7	.563	881	898	3–3	4–6	5–3	4–4
Tampa Bay Storm	8	8	.500	903	876	4–2	5–5	5–3	3–5
New Orleans VooDoo	8	8	.500	893	835	2–4	2–6	6–2	2–6

y - Clinched division
x - Clinched playoff berth

== Regular season schedule ==
Week	Date	Opponent	Result	Record	Location	Attendance	Recap
1	February 29	at Los Angeles Avengers	L 42–59	0–1	Staples Center	13,209	Recap
2	March 9	Orlando Predators	W 54–53	1–1	New Orleans Arena	13,042	Recap
3	March 16	Tampa Bay Storm	W 76–55	2–1	New Orleans Arena	13,011	Recap
4	March 21	Cleveland Gladiators	W 63–24	3–1	New Orleans Arena	13,027	Recap
5	March 30	at Colorado Crush	W 54–51	4–1	Pepsi Center	10,350	Recap
6	April 5	San Jose SaberCats	W 72–43	5–1	New Orleans Arena	14,236	Recap
7	April 12	at Dallas Desperados	L 44–55	5–2	American Airlines Center	12,314	Recap
8	April 18	at Arizona Rattlers	W 60–36	6–2	US Airways Center	11,749	Recap
9	April 25	Utah Blaze	W 70–56	7–2	New Orleans Arena	15,041	Recap
10	May 3	at Georgia Force	L 39–66	7–3	The Arena at Gwinnett Center	10,071	Recap
11	May 9	at Tampa Bay Storm	L 37–41	7–4	St. Pete Times Forum	16,934	Recap
12	Bye Week						
13	May 26	Georgia Force	L 29–40	7–5	New Orleans Arena	16,005	Recap
14	May 30	Columbus Destroyers	W 83–61	8–5	New Orleans Arena	13,206	Recap
15	June 7	at New York Dragons	L 51–58	8–6	Nassau Coliseum	9,922	Recap
16	June 13	at Orlando Predators	L 49–51	8–7	Amway Arena	13,423	Recap
17	June 21	Grand Rapids Rampage	L 70–86	8–8	New Orleans Arena	17,006	Recap

== Regular season ==
=== Week 1: at Los Angeles Avengers ===
Quarter	1	2	3	4	Total
NO	16	17	3	6	42
LA	7	21	14	17	59

at Staples Center, Los Angeles, California

- Date: February 29
- Game time: 10:30 PM EST
- Game attendance: 13,209

Game information

1st Quarter:

- 14:48 NO – Wendall Williams 54 yard Kickoff return (Jonathan Ruffin kick failed) – 6–0 NO
- 08:12 NO – Zach Hilton 5 yard pass from Steve Bellisari (Jonathan Ruffin kick) – 13–0 NO
- 05:07 LA – Timon Marshall 8 yard pass from Sonny Cumbie (David Davis kick) – 13–7 NO
- 00:18 NO – Jonathan Ruffin 20 yard field goal – 16–7 NO

2nd Quarter:

- 11:51 LA – Jarrett Hicks 4 yard pass from Sonny Cumbie (David Davis kick) – 16–14 NO
- 10:12 NO – Wendall Williams 34 yard pass from Steve Bellisari (Jonathan Ruffin kick) – 23–14 NO
- 06:39 LA – Lashaun Ward 33 yard pass from Sonny Cumbie (David Davis kick) – 23–21 NO
- 05:22 LA – Damen Wheeler 15 yard fumble return (David Davis kick) – 28–23 LA
- 02:31 NO – B.J. Barre 15 yard pass from Steve Bellisari (Jonathan Ruffin kick) – 30–28 NO
- 00:00 NO – Jonathan Ruffin 23 yard field goal – 33–28 NO

3rd Quarter:

- 13:57 LA – Timon Marshall 41 yard pass from Sonny Cumbie (Davis kick) – 35–33 LA
- 08:15 NO – Jonathan Ruffin 22 yard field goal – 36–35 NO
- 05:39 LA – Kevin Ingram 18 yard pass from Sonny Cumbie (David Davis kick) – 42–36 LA

4th Quarter:

- 12:56 LA – David Davis 24 yard field goal – 45–36 LA
- 09:07 LA – Timon Marshall 14 yard pass from Sonny Cumbie (David Davis kick) – 52–36 LA
- 02:40 LA – Lashaun Ward 6 yard pass from Sonny Cumbie (David Davis kick) – 59–36 LA
- 00:48 NO – B.J. Barre 9 yard pass from Danny Wimprine (Jonathan Ruffin kick failed) – 59–42 LA
- Officials: Referee: Bill Athan; Umpire: Matt Jordan; Linesman: Allen Baynes; Line judge: Rusty Baynes; Back judge: Greg Wilson
- Player of the Game: Timon Marshall (LA)

=== Week 2: vs. Orlando Predators ===
Quarter	1	2	3	4	Total
ORL	13	14	13	13	53
NO	7	27	7	13	54

at New Orleans Arena, New Orleans, Louisiana

- Date: March 9
- Game time: 3:00 PM EST
- Game attendance: 13,042

Game information

1st Quarter:

- 11:50 ORL – Moye-Moore, Mar 1 yd run (Vaughn, John kick failed) – 6–0 ORL
- 10:03 NO – Jordan, James 14 yd pass from Wimprine, Danny (Ruffin, Jonatha kick) – 7–6 NO
- 02:39 ORL – Moye-Moore, Mar 1 yd run (Vaughn, John kick) – 13–7 ORL

2nd Quarter:

- 11:01 NO – McAlmont, Kevin 4 yd pass from Wimprine, Danny (Ruffin, Jonatha kick failed) – 13–13
- 07:45 ORL – Moye-Moore, Mar 1 yd run (Vaughn, John kick) – 20–13 ORL
- 04:39 NO – Dudley, Javarus 19 yd pass from Wimprine, Danny (Ruffin, Jonatha kick) – 20–20
- 03:04 ORL – Toliver, T.T. 37 yd pass from Stafford, Shane (Vaughn, John kick) – 27–20 ORL
- 00:26 NO – Jordan, James 3 yd pass from Wimprine, Danny (Ruffin, Jonatha kick) – 27–27
- 00:24 NO – Shell, Lin-J 3 yd net recovery (Ruffin, Jonatha kick) – 34–27 NO

3rd Quarter:

- 06:48 ORL – Gessner, Chas 13 yd pass from Stafford, Shane (Vaughn, John kick failed) – 34–33 NO
- 05:11 NO – Dudley, Javarus 29 yd pass from Wimprine, Danny (Ruffin, Jonatha kick) – 41–33 NO
- 03:11 ORL – Toliver, T.T. 26 yd pass from Stafford, Shane (Vaughn, John kick) – 41–40 NO

4th Quarter:

- 12:12 ORL – Carroll, Ahmad 47 yd fumble recovery (Vaughn, John kick) – 47–41 ORL
- 05:43 NO – Jordan, James 2 yd pass from Wimprine, Danny (Ruffin, Jonatha kick) 48–47 NO
- 00:36 NO – Raymond, Keon 42 yd interception return (Ruffin, Jonatha kick failed) 54–27 NO
- 00:00 ORL – Toliver, T.T. 26 yd pass from Stafford, Shane – 54–53 NO
- Officials: Referee: Dave Cutaia; Umpire: Al Granado; Linesman: Mike McCabe; Line judge: Art Lucky; Back judge: James Cole
- Offensive Player of the Game: Danny Wimprine (NO)
- Defensive Player of the Game: Keon Raymond (NO)
- Ironman Player of the Game: Lin-J Shell (NO)

=== Week 3: vs. Tampa Bay Storm ===
Quarter	1	2	3	4	Total
TB	14	0	14	27	55
NO	14	34	14	14	76

at New Orleans Arena, New Orleans, Louisiana

- Date: March 16
- Game time: 3:00 PM EST
- Game attendance: 13,011

Game information

1st Quarter:

- 09:24 NO – Dudley, Javarus 8 yd pass from Wimprine, Danny (Ruffin, Jonatha kick) – 7–0 NO
- 05:32 TB – Edwards, Hank 8 yd pass from Dietz, Brett (Marler, Seth kick) – 7–7
- 04:25 NO – Jordan, James 36 yd pass from Wimprine, Danny (Ruffin, Jonatha kick) – 14–7 NO
- 01:37 TB – Edwards, Hank 17 yd pass from Dietz, Brett (Marler, Seth kick) – 14–14

2nd Quarter:

- 13:42 NO – Jordan, James 33 yd pass from Wimprine, Danny (Ruffin, Jonatha kick) – 21–14 NO
- 11:30 NO – Shell, Lin-J 35 yd interception return (Ruffin, Jonatha kick) – 28–14 NO
- 02:33 NO – Sape, Lauvale 4 yd net recovery (Ruffin, Jonatha kick failed) – 34–14 NO
- 00:08 NO – Williams, Wenda 15 yd pass from Wimprine, Danny (Ruffin, Jonatha kick) – 41–14 NO
- 00:00 NO – Williams, Wenda 57 yd missed FG return (Ruffin, Jonatha kick) – 48–14 NO

3rd Quarter:

- 06:41 TB – Marshall, Torra 1 yd run (Marler, Seth kick) – 48–21 NO
- 05:13 NO – Jordan, James 10 yd pass from Wimprine, Danny (Ruffin, Jonatha kick) – 55–21 NO
- 01:20 NO – Dudley, Javarus 21 yd pass from Wimprine, Danny (Ruffin, Jonatha kick) – 62–21 NO
- 00:00 TB – Edwards, Hank 41 yd pass from Dietz, Brett (Marler, Seth kick) – 62–28 NO

4th Quarter:

- 11:09 TB – Edwards, Hank 15 yd pass from Dietz, Brett (Marler, Seth kick) – 62–35 NO
- 07:40 TB – Johnson, Jeroid 29 yd net recovery (Marler, Seth kick failed) – 62–41 NO
- 05:01 NO – Jordan, James 13 yd pass from Wimprine, Danny (Ruffin, Jonatha kick) – 69–41 NO
- 00:53 TB – Edwards, Hank 3 yd pass from Dietz, Brett (Marler, Seth kick) – 69–41 NO
- 00:48 NO – Lynch, James 7 yd run (Ruffin, Jonatha kick) – 76–48 NO
- 00:14 TB – Dietz, Brett 5 yd run (Marler, Seth kick) – 76–55 NO
- Officials: Referee: Bill McCabe; Umpire: Rick Podraza; Linesman: Rod Pearson; Line judge: Bob McElwee; Back judge: Scott Helverson
- Offensive Player of the Game: James Jordan (NO)
- Defensive Player of the Game: Michale Spicer (NO)
- Ironman Player of the Game: Wendall Williams (NO)

=== Week 4: vs. Cleveland Gladiators ===
Quarter	1	2	3	4	Total
CLE	0	10	0	14	24
NO	21	14	7	21	63

at New Orleans Arena, New Orleans, Louisiana

- Date: March 21
- Game time: 8:30 PM EST
- Game attendance: 13,027

Game information

1st Quarter:

- 12:14 NO – Jordan, J. 16 yd pass from Wimprine, D. (Ruffin, J. kick) – 7–0 NO
- 07:39 NO – Dudley, J. 20 yd pass from Wimprine, D. (Ruffin, J. kick) – 14–0 NO
- 03:09 NO – Jones, T. 36 yd pass from Wimprine, D. (Ruffin, J. kick) – 21–0 NO

2nd Quarter:

- 13:49 CLE – Philyaw, R. 7 yd run (Ball, J. kick) – 21–7 NO
- 02:18 CLE – Ball, J. 30 yd field goal – 21–10 NO
- 00:29 NO – Lynch, J. 2 yd run (Ruffin, J. kick) – 28–10 NO
- 00:00 NO – Williams, W. 53 yd net recovery (Ruffin, J. kick) – 35–10 NO

3rd Quarter:

- 11:05 NO – Jones, T. 18 yd pass from Wimprine, D. (Ruffin, J. kick) – 42–10 NO

4th Quarter:

- 12:25 NO – Lynch, J. 1 yd run (Ruffin, J. kick) – 49–10 NO
- 10:26 CLE – Bonner, C. 31 yd pass from Davis, J. (Ball, J. kick) – 49–17 NO
- 09:16 NO – Jordan, J. 14 yd pass from Bellisari, S. (Ruffin, J. kick) – 56–17 NO
- 08:16 NO – Williams, W. 3 yd net recovery (Ruffin, J. kick) – 63–17 NO
- 04:51 CLE – Bonner, C. 46 yd pass from Davis, J. (Ball, J. kick) – 63–24 NO
- Officials: Referee: Pat Garvey; Umpire: Paul King; Linesman: Bill Ward; Line judge: Dana McKinzie; Back judge: James DeBell
- Offensive Player of the Game: James Jordan (NO)
- Defensive Player of the Game: Calvin Spears (NO)
- Ironman Player of the Game: Wendall Williams (NO)

=== Week 5: at Colorado Crush ===
Quarter	1	2	3	4	Total
NO	6	21	14	13	54
COL	10	14	14	13	51

at Pepsi Center, Denver, Colorado

- Date: March 30
- Game time: 4:00 PM EST
- Game attendance: 10,350

Game information

1st Quarter:

- 11:42 NO – James Jordan 4 yd pass from Danny Wimprine (Alexandre Romero kick failed) – 6–0 NO
- 04:58 COL – Clay Rush 27 yd field goal – 6–3 NO
- 00:48 COL – Willie Quinnie 22 yd pass from John Dutton (Clay Rush kick) – 10–6 COL

2nd Quarter:

- 13:21 NO – Isaiah Ross 3 yd pass from Danny Wimprine (Alexandre Romero kick) – 13–10 NO
- 10:21 COL – Ben Nelson 4 yd pass from John Dutton (Clay Rush kick) – 17–13 COL
- 05:00 NO – James Jordan 4 yd pass from Danny Wimprine (Alexandre Romero kick) – 20–17 NO
- 00:50 COL – Ben Nelson 5 yd pass from John Dutton (Clay Rush kick) – 24–20 COL
- 00:45 NO – Tyronne Jones 13 yd pass from Danny Wimprine (Alexandre Romero kick) – 27–24 NO

3rd Quarter:

- 12:06 COL – Brad Pyatt 14 yd pass from John Dutton (Clay Rush kick) – 31–27 COL
- 09:07 NO – James Jordan 32 yd pass from Danny Wimprine (Alexandre Romero kick) – 34–31 NO
- 04:38 COL – Brad Pyatt 8 yd pass from John Dutton (Clay Rush kick) – 38–34 COL
- 00:36 NO – James Lynch 3 yd run (Alexandre Romero kick) – 41–38 NO

4th Quarter:

- 11:28 COL – Ben Nelson 6 yd pass from John Dutton (Clay Rush kick) – 45–41 COL
- 05:50 NO – James Jordan 3 yd pass from Danny Wimprine (Alexandre Romero kick failed) – 47–45 NO
- 02:57 COL – Brad Pyatt 8 yd pass from John Dutton (Jason Harmon rush failed) – 51–47 COL
- 00:36 NO – Danny Wimprine 1 yd run (Alexandre Romero kick) – 54–51 NO
- Officials: Referee: Bill LeMonnier; Umpire: Jeff Carr; Linesman: Greg Shields; Line judge: Dave Chesney; Back judge: Billy Beckett
- Offensive Player of the Game: Danny Wimprine (NO)
- Defensive Player of the Game: Lin-J Shell (NO)
- Ironman Player of the Game: Tyronne Jones (NO)

=== Week 6: vs. San Jose SaberCats ===
Quarter	1	2	3	4	Total
SJ	7	10	7	19	43
NO	14	27	14	17	72

at New Orleans Arena, New Orleans, Louisiana

- Date: April 5
- Game time: 7:00 PM EST
- Game attendance: 14,236

Game information

1st Quarter:

- 11:33 SJ – Saintil, C. 4 yd pass from Grieb, M. (Haglund, A.J. kick) – 7–0 SJ
- 09:30 NO – Dudley, J. 47 yd pass from Wimprine, D. (Romero, A. kick) – 7–7
- 05:16 NO – Spears, C. 49 yd interception return (Romero, A. kick) – 14–7 NO

2nd Quarter:

- 14:57 SJ – Haglund, A.J. 19 yd field goal – 14–10 NO
- 12:24 NO – Jordan, J. 26 yd pass from Wimprine, D. (Romero, A. kick) – 21–10 NO
- 08:07 SJ – Saintil, C. 9 yd pass from Grieb, M. (Haglund, A.J. kick) – 21–17 NO
- 02:10 NO – Jordan, J. 4 yd pass from Wimprine, D. (Romero, A. kick) – 28–17 NO
- 00:46 NO – LeJeune, N. 32 yd interception return (Romero, A. kick failed) – 34–17 NO
- 00:09 NO – Jordan, J. 3 yd pass from Wimprine, D. (Romero, A. kick) – 41–17 NO

3rd Quarter:

- 09:41 NO – Williams, W. 3 yd run (Romero, A. kick) – 48–17 NO
- 06:14 NO – Jones, T. 7 yd pass from Wimprine, D. (Romero, A. kick) – 55–17 NO
- 00:47 SJ – Saintil, C. 3 yd pass from Grieb, M. (Haglund, A.J. kick) – 55–24 NO

4th Quarter:

- 12:25 NO – Wimprine, D. 2 yd run (Romero, A. kick) – 62–24 NO
- 10:19 SJ – Geathers, J. 10 yd pass from Grieb, M. (Haglund, A.J. kick) – 62–31 NO
- 07:57 NO – Romero, A. 36 yd field goal – 65–31 NO
- 05:31 SJ – Carter, F. 6 yd pass from Grieb, M. (Haglund, A.J. kick failed) – 65–37 NO
- 04:30 NO – Williams, W. 45 yd pass from Bellisari, S. (Romero, A. kick) – 72–37 NO
- 00:45 SJ – Geathers, J. 3 yd pass from Grieb, M. (Rislov, S. pass failed) – 72–43 NO
- Officials: Referee: Perry Havener; Umpire: Tom Laverty; Linesman: Kevin McGrath; Line judge: David Meslow; Back judge: K. Washington
- Offensive Player of the Game: Danny Wimprine (NO)
- Defensive Player of the Game: Calvin Spears (NO)
- Ironman Player of the Game: Wendall Williams (NO)

=== Week 7: at Dallas Desperados ===
Quarter	1	2	3	4	Total
NO	3	21	13	7	44
DAL	7	20	21	7	55

at American Airlines Center, Dallas, Texas

- Date: April 12
- Game time: 7:00 PM CST
- Game attendance: 12,314

Game information

1st Quarter:

- 11:10 DAL – NASH, Marcus 14 yd pass from DOLEZEL, Clint (HAMILTON, Remy kick) – 7–0 DAL
- 04:35 NO – FRANCE, Todd 18 yd field goal – 7–3 DAL

2nd Quarter:

- 13:46 DAL – PETTIS, Will 7 yd pass from DOLEZEL, Clint (HAMILTON, Remy kick failed) – 13–3 DAL
- 12:31 NO – WILLIAMS, Wendall 35 yd pass from WIMPRINE, Danny (FRANCE, Todd kick) – 13–10 DAL
- 11:18 DAL – PETTIS, Will 30 yd pass from DOLEZEL, Clint (HAMILTON, Remy kick) – 20–10 DAL
- 10:21 NO – WILLIAMS, Wendall 56 yd kickoff return (FRANCE, Todd kick) – 20–17 DAL
- 06:06 DAL – PETTIS, Will 26 yd pass from DOLEZEL, Clint (HAMILTON, Remy kick) – 27–17 DAL
- 03:43 NO – DUDLEY, Javarus 19 yd pass from WIMPRINE, Danny (FRANCE, Todd kick) – 27–24 DAL

3rd Quarter:

- 13:45 NO – LeJEUNE, Norman 18 yd interception return (FRANCE, Todd kick) – 31–27 NO
- 08:59 DAL – PETTIS, Will 1 yd run (HAMILTON, Remy kick) 34–31 DAL
- 06:48 NO – DUDLEY, Javarus 26 yd pass from WIMPRINE, Danny (FRANCE, Todd kick failed) – 37–34 NO
- 03:33 DAL – PETTIS, Will 9 yd pass from DOLEZEL, Clint (HAMILTON, Remy kick) – 41–37 DAL
- 01:54 DAL – ARMSTRONG, Anthony 20 yd pass from DOLEZEL, Clint (HAMILTON, Remy kick) – 48–37 DAL

4th Quarter:

- 08:09 DAL – PETTIS, Will 1 yd pass from DOLEZEL, Clint (HAMILTON, Remy kick) – 55–37 DAL
- 05:20 NO – JORDAN, James 4 yd pass from WIMPRINE, Danny (FRANCE, Todd kick) – 55–44 DAL
- Officials: Referee: Riley Johnson; Umpire: Rick Lowe; Linesman: Julian Mapp; Line judge: RG Detillier; Back judge: Bud McCleskey
- Offensive Player of the Game: Clint Dolezel (DAL)
- Defensive Player of the Game: Colston Weatherington (DAL)
- Ironman Player of the Game: Will Pettis (DAL)

=== Week 8: at Arizona Rattlers ===
Quarter	1	2	3	4	Total
NO	17	19	14	10	60
ARZ	0	14	14	8	36

at US Airways Center, Phoenix, Arizona

- Date: April 18
- Game time: 10:00 PM EST
- Game attendance: 11,749

Game information

1st Quarter:

- 14:22 NO – James Jordan 23 yd pass from Danny Wimprine (Todd France kick) – 7–0 NO
- 10:25 NO – James Jordan 14 yd pass from Danny Wimprine (Todd France kick) – 14–0 NO
- 03:40 NO – Todd France 47 yd field goal – 17–0 NO

2nd Quarter:

- 14:54 ARZ – Trandon Harvey 25 yd pass from Lang Campbell (Eric Houle kick) – 17–7 NO
- 09:30 NO – James Jordan 12 yd pass from Danny Wimprine (Todd France kick failed) – 23–7 NO
- 03:56 NO – Isaiah Ross 9 yd pass from Danny Wimprine (Todd France kick failed) – 29–7 NO
- 02:51 ARZ – Trandon Harvey 42 yd kickoff return (Eric Houle kick) – 29–14 NO
- 00:42 NO – James Jordan 26 yd pass from Danny Wimprine (Todd France kick) – 36–14 NO

3rd Quarter:

- 13:56 NO – Norman LeJeune 18 yd interception return (Todd France kick) – 43–14 NO
- 06:43 ARZ – Siaha Burley 2 yd pass from Lang Campbell (Eric Houle kick) – 43–21 NO
- 03:44 NO – DeAndrew Rubin 36 yd pass from Danny Wimprine (Todd France kick) – 50–21 NO
- 00:57 ARZ – Trandon Harvey 23 yd pass from Lang Campbell (Eric Houle kick) – 50–28 NO

4th Quarter:

- 10:38 ARZ – Trandon Harvey 25 yd pass from Lang Campbell (Derrick White rush) – 50–36 NO
- 07:25 NO – Todd France 23 yd field goal – 53–36 NO
- 00:54 NO – James Lynch 2 yd run (Todd France kick) – 60–36 NO
- Officials: Referee: ATHAN, Bill; Umpire: JORDAN, Matt; Linesman: BAYNES, Allen; Line judge: BAYNES, Rusty; Back judge: WILSON, Greg
- Offensive Player of the Game: Danny Wimprine (NO)
- Defensive Player of the Game: Keon Raymond (NO)
- Ironman Player of the Game: Trandon Harvey (ARZ)

=== Week 9: vs. Utah Blaze ===
Quarter	1	2	3	4	Total
UTA	7	7	14	28	56
NO	7	21	28	14	70

at New Orleans Arena, New Orleans, Louisiana

- Date: April 25
- Game time: 8:30 PM EST
- Game attendance: 15,041

Game information

1st Quarter:

- 10:01 UTA – Huey Whittaker 5 yd pass from Joe Germaine (Steve Azar kick) – 7–0 UTA
- 03:11 NO – Jordan, J. 15 yd pass from Wimprine, D. (Todd France kick) 7–7

2nd Quarter:

- 14:53 NO – Dudley, J. 37 yd pass from Wimprine, D. (Todd France kick) – 14–7 NO
- 11:48 UTA – J.J. McKelvey 16 yd pass from Joe Germaine (Steve Azar kick) – 14–14
- 05:36 NO – Jordan, J. 8 yd pass from Wimprine, D. (Todd France kick) – 21–14 NO
- 00:36 NO – Lynch, J. 1 yd run (Todd France kick) – 28–14 NO

3rd Quarter:

- 12:49 NO – DeAndrew Rubin 31 yd pass from Wimprine, D. (Todd France kick) – 35–14 NO
- 10:36 NO – Ross, I. 15 yd pass from Wimprine, D. (Todd France kick) – 42–14 NO
- 09:17 UTA – Aaron Boone 37 yd pass from Joe Germaine (Steve Azar kick) – 42–21 NO
- 08:10 NO – DeAndrew Rubin 9 yd pass from Wimprine, D. (Todd France kick) – 49–21 NO
- 04:53 UTA – Huey Whittaker 4 yd run (Steve Azar kick) – 49–28 NO
- 03:10 NO – Dudley, J. 25 yd pass from Wimprine, D. (Todd France kick) – 56–28 NO

4th Quarter:

- 11:54 NO – Jordan, J. 18 yd pass from Wimprine, D. (Todd France kick) – 63–28 NO
- 07:59 UTA – J.J. McKelvey 5 yd pass from Joe Germaine (Steve Azar kick) – 63–35 NO
- 07:19 UTA – Carlton Brown 4 yd net recovery (Steve Azar kick) – 63–42 NO
- 04:18 NO – Jordan, J. 11 yd pass from Wimprine, D. (Todd France kick) – 70–42 NO
- 00:57 UTA – Aaron Boone 26 yd pass from Joe Germaine (Steve Azar kick) – 70–49 NO
- 00:07 UTA – Huey Whittaker 3 yd pass from Joe Germaine (Steve Azar kick) – 70–56 NO
- Officials: Referee: Bill LeMonnier; Umpire: Mike Delaney; Linesman: Greg Shields; Line judge: Dave Chesney; Back judge: Billy Beckett
- Offensive Player of the Game: Danny Wimprine (NO)
- Defensive Player of the Game: Henry Bryant (NO)
- Ironman Player of the Game: Wendall Williams (NO)

=== Week 10: at Georgia Force ===
Quarter	1	2	3	4	Total
NO	12	7	13	7	39
GA	21	17	14	14	66

at The Arena at Gwinnett Center, Duluth, Georgia

- Date: May 3
- Game time: 7:00 PM EST
- Game attendance: 10,071

Game information

1st Quarter:

- 10:32 GA – HUEBNER, Matt 2 yd run (MARTINEZ, Carlo kick) – 7–0 GA
- 09:01 GA – GROCE, Damien 4 yd run (MARTINEZ, Carlo kick) – 14–0 GA
- 08:01 NO – WILLIAMS, Willi 35 yd pass from WIMPRINE, Danny (FRANCE, Todd kick failed) – 14–6 GA
- 04:59 GA – BERGERON, Troy 15 yd pass from GREISEN, Chris (MARTINEZ, Carlo kick) – 21–6 GA
- 01:13 NO – KEY, Sale 2 yd pass from WIMPRINE, Danny (TANNEY, Mitch pass failed) – 21–12 GA

2nd Quarter:

- 10:48 GA – MARTINEZ, Carlo 34 yd field goal – 24–12 GA
- 05:55 GA – MILLIGAN, Hamin 3 yd pass from GREISEN, Chris (MARTINEZ, Carlo kick) – 31–12 GA
- 00:35 GA – BERGERON, Troy 32 yd pass from GREISEN, Chris (MARTINEZ, Carlo kick) – 38–12 GA
- 00:11 NO – RUBIN, DeAndrew 6 yd pass from WIMPRINE, Danny (FRANCE, Todd kick) – 38–19 GA

3rd Quarter:

- 14:21 NO – RUBIN, DeAndrew 23 yd pass from WIMPRINE, Danny (FRANCE, Todd kick) – 38–26 GA
- 11:30 GA – JONES, Tiger 16 yd pass from GREISEN, Chris (MARTINEZ, Carlo kick) – 45–26 GA
- 07:27 NO – LYNCH, James 2 yd run (FRANCE, Todd kick failed) – 45–32 GA
- 05:54 GA – BERGERON, Troy 43 yd pass from GREISEN, Chris (MARTINEZ, Carlo kick) – 52–32 GA

4th Quarter:

- 14:17 NO – KEY, Sale 3 yd pass from WIMPRINE, Danny (FRANCE, Todd kick) – 52–39 GA
- 13:34 GA – BERGERON, Troy 4 yd pass from GREISEN, Chris (MARTINEZ, Carlo kick) – 59–39 GA
- 04:46 GA – GREISEN, Chris 7 yd run (MARTINEZ, Carlo kick) – 66–39 GA
- Officials: Referee: David Cutaia; Umpire: Al Granado; Linesman: Mike McCabe; Line judge: Art Lucky; Back judge: James Cole
- Offensive Player of the Game: Troy Bergeron (GA)
- Defensive Player of the Game: Hamin Milligan (GA)
- Ironman Player of the Game: Carl Morris (GA)

=== Week 11: at Tampa Bay Storm ===
Quarter	1	2	3	4	Total
NO	6	10	7	14	37
TB	14	7	7	13	41

at St. Pete Times Forum, Tampa, Florida

- Date: May 9
- Game time: 7:30 PM EST
- Game attendance: 16,934

Game information

1st Quarter:

- 13:15 TB – SAMUELS, Lawren 5 yd pass from DIETZ, Brett (MARLER, Seth kick) – 7–0 TB
- 08:13 NO – RUBIN, DeAndrew 13 yd pass from WIMPRINE, Danny (RUFFIN, Johnath kick failed) – 7–6 TB
- 03:50 TB – MARSHALL, Torra 2 yd run (MARLER, Seth kick) – 14–6 TB

2nd Quarter:

- 13:20 NO – KEY, Sale 4 yd pass from WIMPRINE, Danny (RUFFIN, Johnath kick) – 14–13 TB
- 10:47 TB – EDWARDS, Hank 11 yd pass from DIETZ, Brett (MARLER, Seth kick) – 21–13 TB
- 00:01 NO – RUFFIN, Johnath 36 yd field goal – 21–16 TB

3rd Quarter:

- 10:21 TB – MARSHALL, Torra 5 yd run (MARLER, Seth kick) – 28–16 TB
- 03:22 NO – LYNCH, James 1 yd run (RUFFIN, Johnath kick) – 28–23 TB

4th Quarter:

- 14:54 NO – DUDLEY, Javarus 43 yd pass from WIMPRINE, Danny (RUFFIN, Johnath kick) – 30–28 NO
- 13:15 TB – SAMUELS, Lawren 37 yd pass from DIETZ, Brett (MARLER, Seth kick failed) – 34–20 TB
- 06:20 NO – WILLIAMS, Wende 2 yd run (RUFFIN, Johnath kick) – 37–34 NO
- 00:55 TB – SHAW, Terrill 16 yd pass from DIETZ, Brett (MARLER, Seth kick) – 41–37 TB
- Officials: Referee: Dennis Lipski; Umpire: Wes Fritz; Linesman: Neil Brunner; Line judge: Paul Engelberts; Back judge: Tony Lombardo
- Offensive Player of the Game: Lawrence Samuels (TB)
- Defensive Player of the Game: Justin Brown (NO)
- Ironman Player of the Game: Torrance Marshall (TB)

=== Week 12 ===
Bye Week

=== Week 13: vs. Georgia Force ===
Quarter	1	2	3	4	Total
GA	14	7	6	13	40
NO	10	13	6	0	29

at New Orleans Arena, New Orleans, Louisiana

- Date: May 26
- Game time: 8:00 PM EST
- Game attendance: 16,005

Game information

1st Quarter:

- 12:56 GA – Bergeron, T. 21 yd pass from Greisen, C. (Martinez, C. kick) – 7–0 GA
- 09:23 NO – Lynch, J. 24 yd pass from Wimprine, D. (Ruffin, J. kick) – 7–7
- 07:11 GA – Clark, J. 18 yd pass from Morris, C. (Martinez, C. kick) – 14–7 GA
- 01:11 NO – Ruffin, J. 29 yd field goal – 14–10 GA

2nd Quarter:

- 11:40 GA – Huebner, M. 4 yd pass from Greisen, C. (Martinez, C. kick) – 21–10 GA
- 06:16 NO – Lynch, J. 9 yd pass from Wimprine, D. (Ruffin, J. kick) – 21–17 GA
- 00:25 NO – Key, S. 5 yd pass from Wimprine, D. (Ruffin, J. kick failed) – 23–21 NO

3rd Quarter:

- 08:55 NO – Wimprine, D. 4 yd run (Ruffin, J. rush failed) – 29–21 NO
- 02:48 GA – Greisen, C. 1 yd run (Martinez, C. kick failed) – 29–27 NO

4th Quarter:

- 12:33 GA – Jones, T. 8 yd pass from Greisen, C. (Martinez, C. kick) – 34–29 GA
- 06:13 GA – Bergeron, T. 15 yd pass from Greisen, C. (Martinez, C. kick failed) – 40–29 GA
- Officials: Referee: Bill Athan; Umpire: Matt Jordan; Linesman: Allen Baynes; Line judge: Rusty Baynes; Back judge: Greg Wilson
- Offensive Player of the Game: Chris Greisen (GA)
- Defensive Player of the Game: Stephen Cason (GA)
- Ironman Player of the Game: Carl Morris (GA)

=== Week 14: vs. Columbus Destroyers ===
Quarter	1	2	3	4	Total
CLB	14	13	13	21	61
NO	14	20	28	21	83

at New Orleans Arena, New Orleans, Louisiana

- Date: May 30
- Game time: 8:30 PM EST
- Game attendance: 13,206

Game information

1st Quarter:

- 10:11 CLB – Lee, D. 6 yd pass from Nagy, M. (Lewis, M. kick) – 7–0 CLB
- 07:58 NO – Dudley, J. 15 yd pass from Wimprine, D. (Ruffin, J. kick) – 7–7
- 04:18 CLB – Russell, C. 5 yd run (Lewis, M. kick) – 14–7 CLB
- 00:05 NO – Jordan, J. 10 yd pass from Wimprine, D. (Ruffin, J. kick) – 14–14

2nd Quarter:

- 12:56 CLB – Russell, C. 11 yd pass from Nagy, M. (Lewis, M. kick failed) – 20–14 CLB
- 11:07 NO – Dudley, J. 8 yd pass from Wimprine, D. (Ruffin, J. kick) – 21–20 NO
- 04:29 NO – Ruffin, J. 45 yd field goal – 24–20 NO
- 00:47 CLB – Russell, C. 4 yd pass from Nagy, M. (Lewis, M. kick) – 27–24 CLB
- 00:11 NO – Ruffin, J. 31 yd field goal – 27–27
- 00:00 NO – Floyd, A. 27 yd interception return (Ruffin, J. kick) – 34–27 NO

3rd Quarter:

- 12:46 NO – Dudley, J. 9 yd pass from Wimprine, D. (Ruffin, J. kick) – 41–27
- 10:14 CLB – Lee, D. 44 yd pass from Nagy, M. (Lewis, M. kick) – 41–34 NO
- 09:04 NO – Jordan, J. 38 yd pass from Wimprine, D. (Ruffin, J. kick) – 48–34 NO
- 08:14 NO – Key, S. 3 yd net recovery (Ruffin, J. kick) – 55–34 NO
- 02:04 CLB – Wells, H. 1 yd run (Lewis, M. kick failed) – 55–40 NO
- 01:12 NO – Jordan, J. 6 yd pass from Wimprine, D. (Ruffin, J. kick) – 62–40 NO

4th Quarter:

- 09:38 CLB – Wells, H. 6 yd pass from Nagy, M. (Lewis, M. kick) – 62–47 NO
- 06:50 NO – Wimprine, D. 8 yd run (Ruffin, J. kick) – 69–47 NO
- 04:00 NO – Key, S. 6 yd pass from Wimprine, D. (Ruffin, J. kick) – 76–47 NO
- 00:59 CLB – Russell, C. 6 yd pass from Nagy, M. (Lewis, M. kick) – 76–54 NO
- 00:40 NO – Bellisari, S. 3 yd run (Ruffin, J. kick) – 83–54 NO
- 00:19 CLB – Johnson, C.J. 23 yd pass from Nagy, M. (Lewis, M. kick) – 83–61 NO
- Officials: Referee: Dave Cutaia; Umpire: Wes Fritz; Linesman: Neil Brunner; Line judge: Paul Engelberts; Back judge: Tony Lombardo
- Offensive Player of the Game: Danny Wimprine (NO)
- Defensive Player of the Game: Sale' Key (NO)
- Ironman Player of the Game: Anthony Floyd (NO)

=== Week 15: at New York Dragons ===
Quarter	1	2	3	4	Total
NO	14	23	7	7	51
NY	10	20	14	14	58

at Nassau Veterans Memorial Coliseum, Uniondale, New York

- Date: June 7
- Game time: 7:00 PM EST
- Game attendance: 9,922

Game information

1st Quarter:

- 09:29 NO – James Jordan 5 yd pass from Danny Wimprine (Jonathan Ruffin kick) – 7–0 NO
- 06:34 NY – Keron Henry 2 yd run (Steve Azar kick) – 7–7
- 05:42 NO – Jeremiah Pope 56 yd kickoff return (Jonathan Ruffin kick) – 14–7 NO
- 01:34 NY – Steve Azar 48 yd field goal – 14–10 NO

2nd Quarter:

- 14:13 NO – Ira Gooch 6 yd pass from Danny Wimprine (Jonathan Ruffin kick) – 21–10 NO
- 09:21 NY – Kevin Swayne 3 yd pass from Aaron Garcia (Steve Azar kick) – 21–17 NO
- 06:41 NO – Jeremiah Pope 18 yd pass from Danny Wimprine (Jonathan Ruffin kick) – 28–17 NO
- 04:25 NY – Kevin Swayne 22 yd pass from Aaron Garcia (Steve Azar kick blocked) – 28–23 NO
- 04:25 NO – Lin-J Shell PAT return – 30–23 NO
- 01:55 NO – Ira Gooch 44 yd pass from Danny Wimprine (Jonathan Ruffin kick) – 37–23 NO
- 00:15 NY – Ricky Hall 9 yd pass from Aaron Garcia (Steve Azar kick) – 37–30 NO

3rd Quarter:

- 08:28 NY – Keron Henry 2 yd run (Steve Azar kick) – 37–37
- 04:58 NO – Jeremiah Pope 14 yd pass from Danny Wimprine (Jonathan Ruffin kick) – 44–37 NO
- 01:32 NY – Kevin Swayne 14 yd pass from Aaron Garcia (Steve Azar kick) – 44–44

4th Quarter:

- 08:36 NY – Kevin Swayne 7 yd pass from Aaron Garcia (Steve Azar kick) – 51–44 NY
- 05:17 NO – James Lynch 10 yd pass from Danny Wimprine (Jonathan Ruffin kick) – 51–51
- 02:15 NY – Keron Henry 3 yd run (Steve Azar kick) – 58–51 NY
- Officials: Referee: Bill McCabe; Umpire: Jeff Carr; Linesman: Shawn Hochuli; Line judge: Dirk Bell; Back judge: Jimmy Buchanan
- Offensive Player of the Game: Kevin Swayne (NY)
- Defensive Player of the Game: Billy Parker (NY)
- Ironman Player of the Game: Jeremiah Pope (NY)

=== Week 16: at Orlando Predators ===
Quarter	1	2	3	4	Total
NO	0	27	15	7	49
ORL	7	14	14	16	51

at Amway Arena, Orlando, Florida

- Date: June 13
- Game time: 7:30 PM EST
- Game attendance: 13,423

Game information

1st Quarter:

- 09:53 ORL – ARMSTRONG, Odie 19 yd pass from STAFFORD, Shane (FRANCE, Todd kick) – 7–0 ORL

2nd Quarter:

- 10:29 NO – WIMPRINE, Danny 1 yd run (RUFFIN, J. kick) – 7–7
- 06:09 ORL – THOMAS, Levon 13 yd pass from STAFFORD, Shane (FRANCE, Todd kick) – 14–7 ORL
- 05:07 NO – JORDAN, James 44 yd pass from WIMPRINE, Danny (RUFFIN, J. kick) – 14–14
- 04:02 NO – LYNCH, James 20 yd pass from WIMPRINE, Danny (RUFFIN, J. kick) – 21–14 NO
- 03:02 ORL – THOMAS, Levon 8 yd kickoff return (FRANCE, Todd kick) – 21–21
- 00:33 NO – WIMPRINE, Danny 1 yd run (RUFFIN, J. kick failed) – 27–21 NO

3rd Quarter:

- 10:40 ORL – ARMSTRONG, Odie 3 yd run (FRANCE, Todd kick) – 28–27 ORL
- 07:53 NO – DUDLEY, Javarus 30 yd pass from WIMPRINE, Danny (RUFFIN, J. kick) – 34–28 NO
- 05:46 ORL – THOMAS, Levon 27 yd pass from STAFFORD, Shane (FRANCE, Todd kick) – 35–34 ORL
- 02:42 NO – ROSS, Isaiah 15 yd pass from WIMPRINE, Danny (BELLISARI, S. rush) – 42–35 NO

4th Quarter:

- 12:58 ORL – NICKERSON, K. 7 yd pass from STAFFORD, Shane (FRANCE, Todd kick) – 42–42
- 12:04 ORL – TEAM safety – 44–42 ORL
- 10:03 ORL – ARMSTRONG, Odie 25 yd run (FRANCE, Todd kick) – 51–42 ORL
- 07:33 NO – DUDLEY, Javarus 7 yd pass from WIMPRINE, Danny (RUFFIN, J. kick) – 51–49 ORL
- Officials: Referee: Tom McCabe; Umpire: Paul Frerking; Linesman: Allen Baynes; Line judge: Bob McKelwee; Back judge: Scott Helverson
- Offensive Player of the Game: Levon Thomas (ORL)
- Defensive Player of the Game: Jason Perry (ORL)
- Ironman Player of the Game: Odie Armstrong (ORL)

=== Week 17: vs. Grand Rapids Rampage ===
Quarter	1	2	3	4	Total
GR	21	27	10	28	86
NO	14	21	14	21	70

at New Orleans Arena, New Orleans, Louisiana

- Date: June 21
- Game time: 7:00 PM EST
- Game attendance: 17,006

Game information

1st Quarter:

- 11:50 GR – MacPherson, J. 1 yd run (Gowins, B. kick) – 7–0 GR
- 08:16 NO – Wimprine, D. 1 yd run (Ruffin, J. kick) – 7–7
- 05:26 GR – Johnson, c. 19 yd pass from MacPherson, J. (Gowins, B. kick) – 14–7 GR
- 04:19 NO – Pope, J. 45 yd pass from Wimprine, D. (Ruffin, J. kick) – 14–14
- 00:30 GR – Higgins, K. 24 yd pass from MacPherson, J. (Gowins, B. kick) – 21–14

2nd Quarter:

- 14:31 NO – Dudley, J. 36 yd pass from Wimprine, D. (Ruffin, J. kick) – 21–21
- 12:50 GR – Johnson, c. 8 yd pass from MacPherson, J. (Gowins, B. kick) – 28–21 GR
- 11:46 GR – Magner, C. 1 yd run (Gowins, B. kick) – 35–21 GR
- 09:14 GR – MacPherson, J. 4 yd run (Gowins, B. kick) – 42–21 GR
- 05:10 NO – Dudley, J. 30 yd pass from Wimprine, D. (Ruffin, J. kick) – 42–28 GR
- 02:12 GR – Gowins, B. 24 yd field goal – 45–28 GR
- 00:36 NO – Ross, I. 17 yd pass from Wimprine, D. (Ruffin, J. kick) – 45–35 GR
- 00:00 GR – Gowins, B. 18 yd field goal – 48–35 GR

3rd Quarter:

- 10:37 GR – Gowins, B. 20 yd field goal – 51–35 GR
- 06:29 NO – Jordan, J. 5 yd pass from Wimprine, D. (Ruffin, J. kick) – 51–42 GR
- 04:11 GR – Lewis, J. 31 yd pass from MacPherson, J. (Gowins, B. kick) – 58–42 GR
- 00:45 NO – Pope, J. 6 yd pass from Wimprine, D. (Ruffin, J. kick) – 58–49 GR

4th Quarter:

- 14:57 GR – Higgins, K. 3 yd pass from MacPherson, J. (Gowins, B. kick) – 65–49
- 09:48 NO – Jordan, J. 16 yd pass from Wimprine, D. (Ruffin, J. kick failed) – 65–55 GR
- 07:30 GR – Lewis, J. 4 yd pass from MacPherson, J. (Gowins, B. kick) – 72–55 GR
- 02:14 GR – Higgins, K. 29 yd pass from MacPherson, J. (Gowins, B. kick) – 79–55 GR
- 01:14 NO – Pope, J. 54 yd kickoff return (Bellisari, S. rush) – 79–63 GR
- 00:11 GR – MacPherson, J. 4 yd run (Gowins, B. kick) – 86–63 GR
- 00:00 NO – Jordan, J. 26 yd pass from Wimprine, D. (Ruffin, J. kick) – 86–70 GR
- Officials: Referee: Dennis Lipski; Umpire: Rick Nelson; Linesman: Julian Mapp; Line judge: R.G. Detillier; Back judge: Bud McClesky
- Offensive Player of the Game: James MacPherson (GR)
- Defensive Player of the Game: William Haith (GR)
- Ironman Player of the Game: Jermaine Lewis (GR)
