= Tom Briggs (gridiron football) =

American gridiron football player (born 1970)

No. 93
- Position: Defensive lineman

Personal information
- Born: May 12, 1970 (age 56); Syracuse, New York, U.S.
- Listed height: 6 ft 4 in (1.93 m)
- Listed weight: 270 lb (122 kg)

Career information
- College: West Virginia
- NFL draft: 1993: undrafted

Career history
- Birmingham Barracudas (1995); Anaheim Piranhas (1997); Portland Forest Dragons (1998–1999); Oklahoma Wranglers (2000–2001); Dallas Desperados (2002–2003); Austin Wranglers (2004–2006); Tampa Bay Storm (2007–2008)

Awards and highlights
- First-team All-Arena (2003, 2004); Second-team All-Arena (2000); Lineman of the Year (2003)
- Stats at ArenaFan.com

Tom Briggs (born May 12, 1970) is a former Arena Football League defensive lineman. He was originally signed by the Birmingham Barracudas of the Canadian Football League (CFL). He played college football at West Virginia.

Briggs enters the 2009 season ranked third all-time with 50 career sacks and fifth all-time with 21 career forced fumbles in AFL history.

== College career ==
Briggs started his collegiate career at Moorpark College (1988c1990), located in Moorpark, California. He was a standout defensive end, earning All American honors and eventually earning a scholarship to West Virginia. Briggs began his West Virginia career in the fall of 1990, where he only recorded two tackles. In 1991, Briggs recorded 44 tackles, five sacks, three fumbles recoveries, and one forced fumble. In 1992, he totaled 47 tackles, seven sacks, a forced fumble and a fumble recovery.

== Professional career ==
=== Early career ===
In 1993, Briggs went undrafted in the NFL draft and joined onto the Atlanta Falcons training camp roster. Following his short stint in the National Football League, Briggs moved onto the Canadian Football League with the Birmingham Barracudas and the Saskatchewan Roughriders.

=== Arena Football League ===
In 1997, Briggs left the CFL for the Arena Football League and the Portland Forest Dragons. That season, he recorded only eight tackles before moving to the Anaheim Piranhas to end the season. For the 1998 season, Briggs rejoined the Forest Dragons and finished the year with 11 tackles, three sacks, one forced fumble and two fumble recoveries. In Briggs's final season in Portland, 1999, he finished the year with 12 tackles, two fumble recoveries, an interception, and two forced fumbles.

In 2000, Briggs moved with Portland as they became the Oklahoma Wranglers. He finished the year with 16 tackles, four sacks, two fumble recoveries, and a forced fumble. The next season, his final in Oklahoma, Briggs finished with nine tackles, five sacks and a forced fumble. During his tenure with the Wranglers, Briggs earned Second Team All-Arena honors in 2000 and was named to the 2001 All-Ironman Team.

In 2002, Briggs moved to the Dallas Desperados and became the team's all-time leader of sacks in a season with 10 sacks and became the career leader with 12.5 in his two seasons there. He also totaled 60 tackles and four forced fumbles in his two seasons as a Desperado. The following year, he earned First-team All-Arena, the Lineman of the Year Award, and was named to the All-Ironman Team.

In 2004, Briggs joined the Austin Wranglers. In his debut season in Austin, Briggs set the franchise record of 8.5 sacks in a season, along with recording 21 tackles and two fumble recoveries. That season, he was named to the First-team All-Arena squad. In 2005, Briggs recorded 25 tackles, and in his final season he totaled only 5 tackles with a forced fumble.

In 2007, Briggs joined the Tampa Bay Storm. Despite playing half of the season with a broken hand, Briggs recorded 28.5 tackles, five sacks, and four forced fumbles.

In 2008, Briggs finished with 14 tackles, four sacks, two interceptions, two forced fumbles, and a fumble recovery in his second season in Tampa Bay. Briggs also had two defensive touchdowns on the season.
