= 2008 Chicago Rush season =

Arena Football League team season

- Head coach: Mike Hohensee
- Home stadium: Allstate Arena

Results
- Record: 11–5
- Division place: 1st
- Playoffs: Lost Divisional Playoffs (Rampage) 41–58
- Team DPY: Dennison Robinson

The 2008 Chicago Rush season was the eighth season for the franchise. The Rush finished the regular season 11–5, making the playoffs again as they have in every year of their existence. They won their second consecutive Central Division title, and entered the playoffs as the top seed in the American Conference. They were eliminated from the playoffs in the Divisional round by the Grand Rapids Rampage, 41–58.

== Standings ==
Central Division
Team	W	L	PCT	PF	PA	DIV	CON	Home	Away
z-Chicago Rush	11	5	.688	926	765	6–0	9–1	7–1	4–4
x-Colorado Crush	6	10	.375	847	907	2–4	4–6	4–4	2–6
x-Grand Rapids Rampage	6	10	.375	952	968	3–3	4–6	3–5	3–5
Kansas City Brigade	3	13	.188	752	923	1–5	1–9	2–6	1–7

z - Clinched division and conference's best record
x - Clinched playoff berth

== Regular season schedule ==
Week	Date	Opponent	Result	Record	Location	Attendance	Recap
1	March 3	San Jose SaberCats	W 70–47	1–0	Allstate Arena	15,409	Recap
2	March 9	Philadelphia Soul	L 49–60	1–1	Allstate Arena	16,051	Recap
3	March 14	at Grand Rapids Rampage	W 64–35	2–1	Van Andel Arena	10,594	Recap
4	March 22	Colorado Crush	W 70–35	3–1	Allstate Arena	16,036	Recap
5	March 28	Arizona Rattlers	W 59–35	4–1	Allstate Arena	15,058	Recap
6	April 6	at Orlando Predators	L 56–57 (OT)	4–2	Amway Arena	12,483	Recap
7	April 14	at Kansas City Brigade	W 49–42	5–2	Sprint Center	13,184	Recap
8	April 20	Grand Rapids Rampage	W 55–52	6–2	Allstate Arena	16,112	Recap
9	April 25	at Colorado Crush	W 65–52	7–2	Pepsi Center	11,114	Recap
10	May 5	at Tampa Bay Storm	W 51–46	8–2	St. Pete Times Forum	14,491	Recap
11	Bye Week						
12	May 19	Los Angeles Avengers	W 72–28	9–2	Allstate Arena	15,904	Recap
13	May 24	at Utah Blaze	L 48–51	9–3	EnergySolutions Arena	15,295	Recap
14	May 31	Kansas City Brigade	W 52–47	10–3	Allstate Arena	16,164	Recap
15	June 7	at Cleveland Gladiators	L 44–65	10–4	Quicken Loans Arena	11,377	Recap
16	June 14	at Georgia Force	L 47–50	10–5	The Arena at Gwinnett Center	11,073	Recap
17	June 22	Dallas Desperados	W 75–63	11–5	Allstate Arena	16,260	Recap

== Playoff schedule ==
Round	Date	Opponent (seed)	Result	Location	Attendance	Recap
AC Divisional	July 6	Grand Rapids Rampage (6)	L 41–58	Allstate Arena	14,338	Recap

== Final roster ==
2008 Chicago Rush roster
Quarterbacks: 13 Sherdrick Bonner; 8 Russ Michna; Fullbacks: 38 Dan Alexander; Wide receivers: 9 Ryan Dennard; 1 Damian Harrell; 88 Travis LaTendresse; 2 Donovan Morgan	Offensive linemen: 94 Robert Boss; 56 Beau Elliot; 70 Rob McMackin; 98 John Sikora; Defensive linemen: 95 James Baron; 99 John Moyer; 93 Joe Peters; 58 Khreem Smith; 75 Nick Zeck	Linebackers: 15 Liam Ezekiel; Defensive backs: 19 Carlos Hendricks; 20 Jonothan Ordway; 21 Dennison Robinson; 37 Jeremy Unertl; Kickers: 22 Paul Edinger; 4 Todd France	Injury reserve: 23 DeJuan Alfonzo LB (IR); 25 Matt Kinsinger FB (IR); 11 Rob Mager WR (IR); 7 James Sadler DB (IR); 10 Clinton Solomon WR (IR); 3 Talib Wise DB (IR); Refused to report: currently vacant; Other league exempt: 96 Earl Cochran DE (Exempt); Suspension: currently vacant; Practice squad: 80 B. J. Barre WR; rookies in italics Roster updated July 29, 2010; 23 Active, 8 Inactive → More rosters

== Stats ==
=== Passing ===
Passer	Rating	ATT-CMP-INT	PCT	YDS	TD	LNG
Russ Michna	121.94	327–223–7	68.2	2540	53	45
Sherdrick Bonner	108.55	167–99–5	59.3	1287	25	45

=== Receiving ===
Receiver	No.	YDS	AVG	LNG	TD
Donovan Morgan	113	1300	11.5	33t	24
Damian Harrell	94	1165	12.4	45t	25
Travis LaTendresse	91	1105	12.1	30t	20
Robert Boss	15	187	12.5	26	3
Dan Alexander	14	141	10.1	28t	5
Ryan Dennard	8	125	15.6	27t	4
BJ Barre	7	89	12.7	40	2
DeJuan Alfonzo	2	12	6.0	8t	1
Joe Peters	1	2	2.0	2t	1
John Peaua	1	0	0.0	0	0

== Regular season ==
=== Week 1: vs. San Jose SaberCats ===
Quarter	1	2	3	4	Total
SJ	14	13	7	13	47
CHI	14	14	14	28	70

at Allstate Arena, Rosemont, Illinois

- Date: March 3
- Game time: 9:00 PM EST
- Game attendance: 15,409

Game information

1st Quarter:

- CHI- Damian Harrell 29 YD pass from Sherdrick Bonner (Dan Frantz kick) – 7–0 CHI
- CHI- DeJuan Alfonzo 20 YD fumble recovery (Dan Frantz kick) – 14–0 CHI
- SJ- James Roe 6 YD pass from Mark Grieb (A.J. Haglund kick) – 14–7 CHI
- SJ- Cleannord Saintil 16 YD pass from Mark Grieb (A.J. Haglund kick) – 14–14

2nd Quarter:

- SJ- Rodney Wright 6 YD pass from Mark Grieb (A.J. Haglund kick) – 21–14 SJ
- CHI- Donovan Morgan 28 YD pass from Sherdrick Bonner (Dan Frantz kick) – 21–21
- SJ- A.J. Haglund 25 YD field goal – 24–21 SJ
- CHI- Travis LaTendresse 8 YD pass from Sherdrick Bonner (Dan Frantz kick) 28–24 CHI
- SJ- A.J. Haglund 45 YD field goal – 28–27 CHI

3rd Quarter:

- CHI- Damian Harrell 33 YD pass from Sherdrick Bonner (Dan Frantz kick) – 35–27 CHI
- CHI- Travis LaTendresse 23 YD pass from Sherdrick Bonner (Dan Frantz kick) – 42–27 CHI
- SJ- Frank Carter 1 YD run (A.J. Haglund kick) – 42–34 CHI

4th Quarter:

- CHI- Dan Alexander 5 YD run (Dan Frantz kick) – 49–34 CHI
- CHI- Donovan Morgan 15 YD pass from Sherdrick Bonner (Dan Frantz kick) – 56–34 CHI
- SJ- Cleannord Saintil 31 YD pass from Mark Grieb (A.J. Haglund kick) – 56–41 CHI
- CHI- DeJuan Alfonzo 0 YD fumble recovery (Dan Frantz kick) – 63–41 CHI
- SJ- Rodney Wright 4 YD pass from Mark Grieb (Frank Carter rush failed) 63–47 CHI
- CHI- Russ Michna 2 YD run (Dan Frantz kick) 70–47 CHI
- Officials: Officials: Referee: Dave Cutaia; Umpire: Al Granado; Linesman: Mike McCabe; Line judge: Art Lucky; Back judge: James Cole
- Offensive Player of the Game: Damian Harrell
- Defensive Player of the Game: Dennison Robinson
- Ironman Player of the Game: DeJuan Alfonzo

=== Week 2: vs. Philadelphia Soul ===
Quarter	1	2	3	4	Total
PHI	6	20	17	17	60
CHI	7	21	7	14	49

at Allstate Arena, Rosemont, Illinois

- Date: March 9
- Game time: 1:00 PM EST
- Game attendance: 16,051

Game information

1st Quarter:

- 07:40 PHI – Larry Brackins 34 yd pass from Tony Graziani (Connor Hughes kick failed) – 6–0 PHI
- 01:20 CHI – Dan Alexander 28 yd pass from Sherdrick Bonner (Dan Frantz kick) – 7–6 CHI

2nd Quarter:

- 12:30 PHI – Clifton Smith 1 yd run (Connor Hughes kick) – 13–7 PHI
- 06:08 CHI – Dan Alexander 1 yd run (Dan Frantz kick) – 14–13 CHI
- 05:11 PHI – Mike Brown 54 yd kickoff return (Connor Hughes kick) – 20–14 PHI
- 00:55 CHI – Damian Harrell 18 yd pass from Sherdrick Bonner (Dan Frantz kick) – 21–20 CHI
- 00:47 PHI – Larry Brackins 2 yd pass from Tony Graziani (Connor Hughes kick failed) – 26–21 PHI
- 00:01 CHI – Dan Alexander 5 yd pass from Sherdrick Bonner (Dan Frantz kick) – 28–26 CHI

3rd Quarter:

- 11:19 PHI – Connor Hughes 19 yd field goal – 29–28 PHI
- 08:33 CHI – Damian Harrell 7 yd pass from Sherdrick Bonner (Dan Frantz kick) – 35–29 CHI
- 05:14 PHI – Chris Jackson 3 yd pass from Tony Graziani (Connor Hughes kick) – 36–35 PHI
- 01:14 PHI – Chris Jackson 14 yd pass from Tony Graziani (Connor Hughes kick) – 43–35 PHI

4th Quarter:

- 10:12 PHI – Chris Jackson 12 yd pass from Tony Graziani (Connor Hughes kick) – 50–35 PHI
- 06:44 CHI – Damian Harrell 12 yd pass from Sherdrick Bonner (Dan Frantz kick) – 50–42 PHI
- 03:19 PHI – Tony Graziani 6 yd run (Connor Hughes kick) – 57–42 PHI
- 00:36 CHI – Dan Alexander 7 yd pass from Sherdrick Bonner (Dan Frantz kick) – 57–49 PHI
- 00:16 PHI – Connor Hughes 22 yd field goal – 60–49 PHI
- Officials: Referee: Bill Athan; Umpire: Matt Jordan; Linesman: Allen Baynes; Line judge: Rusty Baynes; Back judge: Greg Wilson
- Offensive Player of the Game: Chris Jackson (PHI)
- Defensive Player of the Game: Mike Brown (PHI)
- Ironman Player of the Game: Mike Brown (PHI)

=== Week 3: at Grand Rapids Rampage ===
Quarter	1	2	3	4	Total
CHI	22	7	14	21	64
GR	7	0	7	21	35

at Van Andel Arena, Grand Rapids, Michigan

- Date: March 14
- Game time: 7:00 PM EST
- Game attendance: 10,594

Game information

1st Quarter:

- 14:22 CHI – MOYER safety – 2–0 CHI
- 13:44 CHI – HARRELL 45 yd pass from MICHNA (FRANTZ kick failed) – 8–0 CHI
- 12:56 CHI – ALFONZO 5 yd net recovery (FRANTZ kick) – 15–0 CHI
- 08:24 CHI – HARRELL 22 yd pass from MICHNA (FRANTZ kick) – 22–0 CHI
- 05:00 GR – MCPHERSON 10 yd run (HOULE kick) – 22–7 CHI

2nd Quarter:

- 00:11 CHI – ALFONZO 2 yd run (FRANTZ kick) – 29–7 CHI

3rd Quarter:

- 10:56 CHI – MORGAN 9 yd pass from MICHNA (FRANTZ kick) – 36–7 CHI
- 04:37 GR – HINES 10 yd pass from MACPHERSON (HOULE kick) – 36–14 CHI
- 00:04 CHI – ALEXANDER 3 yd run (FRANTZ kick) – 43–14 CHI

4th Quarter:

- 10:54 GRA – JOHNSON 5 yd pass from MACPHERSON (HOULE kick failed) – 43–20 CHI
- 09:58 CHI – LATENDRESSE 26 yd pass from MICHNA (FRANTZ kick) – 50–20 CHI
- 07:22 GRA – HIGGINS 12 yd pass from MACPHERSON (HINES pass from MACPHERSON) – 50–28 CHI
- 04:53 CHI – DENNARD 26 yd pass from MICHNA (FRANTZ kick) – 57–28 CHI
- 00:56 CHI – ROBINSON 45 yd interception return (FRANTZ kick) – 64–28 CHI
- 00:15 GRA – HIGGINS 5 yd pass from MACPHERSON (HOULE kick) – 64–35 CHI
- Officials: Referee: Tom McCabe; Umpire: Wes Fritz; Linesman: Neil Brunner; Line judge: Paul Engelberts; Back judge: Tony Lombardo
- Offensive Player of the Game: Russ Michina (CHI)
- Defensive Player of the Game: John Moyer (CHI)
- Ironman Player of the Game: DeJuan Alfonzo (CHI)

=== Week 4: vs. Colorado Crush ===
Quarter	1	2	3	4	Total
COL	7	21	7	0	35
CHI	13	27	9	21	70

at Allstate Arena, Rosemont, Illinois

- Date: March 22
- Game time: 8:00 PM EST
- Game attendance: 16,036

Game information

1st Quarter:

- 10:46 CHI – MORGAN 5 Yd Pass From BONNER (FRANTZ kick Failed) – 6–0 CHI
- 08:56 COL – QUINNIE 28 Yd Pass From DUTTON (RUSH Kick) – 7–6 COL
- 04:24 CHI – MICHNA 1 Yd Run (FRANTZ kick) – 13–7 CHI

2nd Quarter:

- 09:36 CHI – MICHNA 2 Yd Run (FRANTZ kick) – 20–7 CHI
- 06:44 COL – THOMAS 9 Yd Pass From DUTTON (RUSH kick) – 20–14 CHI
- 04:43 CHI – HARRELL 23 Yd Pass From BONNER (FRANTZ kick) – 27–14 CHI
- 01:06 COL – PYATT 2 Yd Pass From THOMAS (RUSH kick) – 27–21 CHI
- 00:54 CHI – HARRELL 7 Yd Pass From BONNER (FRANTZ kick failed) – 33–21 CHI
- 00:39 COL – PYATT 26 Yd Pass From DUTTON (RUSH kick) – 33–28 CHI
- 00:26 CHI – ALEXANDER 10 yd run (FRANTZ kick) – 40–28 CHI

3rd Quarter:

- 12:08 COL – QUINNIE 10 Yd Pass From DUTTON (RUSH kick) – 40–35 CHI
- 07:16 CHI – HARRELL 45 yd Pass from MICHNA (FRANTZ kick) – 47–35 CHI
- 03:50 CHI – Ball Through End Zone – 49–35 CHI

4th Quarter:

- 13:31 CHI – PETERS 2 Yd Pass From MICHNA (FRANTZ kick) – 56–35 CHI
- 07:01 CHI – LATENDREESE 10 Yd Pass From BONNER (FRANTZ kick) – 63–35 CHI
- 01:54 CHI – ALFONZO 8 Yd Pass From MICHNA (FRANTZ kick) – 70–35 CHI
- Officials: Referee: Riley Johnson; Umpire: Paul Frerking; Linesman: Julian Mapp; Line judge: RG Detillier; Back judge: Bud McCleskey
- Offensive Player of the Game: N/A
- Defensive Player of the Game: N/A
- Ironman Player of the Game: N/A

=== Week 5: vs. Arizona Rattlers ===
Quarter	1	2	3	4	Total
ARZ	7	7	7	14	35
CHI	14	14	7	24	59

at Allstate Arena, Rosemont, Illinois

- Date: March 28
- Game time: 8:30 PM EST
- Game attendance: 15,058

Game information

1st Quarter:

- 12:00 ARZ – Siaha Burley 3 yd pass from Jeff Smoker (Eric Houle kick) – 7–0 ARZ
- 08:18 CHI – DeJuan Alfonzo 2 yd run (Dan Frantz kick) – 7–7
- 02:54 CHI – Travis LaTendresse 14 yd pass from Sherdrick Bonner (Dan Frantz kick) – 14–7 CHI

2nd Quarter:

- 13:09 ARZ – Keyuo Craver 42 yd interception return (Eric Houle kick) – 14–14
- 08:42 CHI – Damian Harrell 15 yd pass from Sherdrick Bonner (Dan Frantz kick) – 21–14 CHI
- 05:19 CHI – Russ Michna 1 yd run (Dan Frantz kick) – 28–14 CHI

3rd Quarter:

- 07:52 ARZ – Siaha Burley 5 yd pass from Jeff Smoker (Eric Houle kick) – 28–21 CHI
- 05:14 CHI – Damian Harrell 45 yd pass from Sherdrick Bonner (Dan Frantz kick) – 35–21 CHI

4th Quarter:

- 13:29 CHI – Robert Boss 10 yd pass from Sherdrick Bonner (Dan Frantz kick) – 42–21 CHI
- 09:51 ARZ – Siaha Burley 9 yd pass from Jeff Smoker (Eric Houle kick) – 42–28 CHI
- 08:54 CHI – Dan Alexander 10 yd run (Dan Frantz kick) – 49–28 CHI
- 02:51 CHI – Damian Harrell 3 yd pass from Sherdrick Bonner (Dan Frantz kick) – 56–28 CHI
- 00:39 CHI – Dan Frantz 26 yd field goal – 59–28 CHI
- 00:07 ARZ – Siaha Burley 9 yd pass from Jeff Smoker (Eric Houle kick) – 59–35 CHI
- Officials: Referee: Perry Havener; Umpire: Tom Laverty; Linesman: Kavin McGrath; Line judge: David Meslow; Back judge: Keith Washington
- Offensive Player of the Game: Damian Harrell (CHI)
- Defensive Player of the Game: John Moyer (CHI)
- Ironman Player of the Game: DeJuan Alfonzo (CHI)

=== Week 6: at Orlando Predators ===
Quarter	1	2	3	4	OT	Total
LA	14	7	14	14	7	56
ORL	13	14	0	22	8	57

at Amway Arena, Orlando, Florida

- Date: April 6
- Game time: 2:00 PM EST
- Game attendance: 12,483

Game information

1st Quarter:

- 11:44 CHI – DENNARD, Ryan 14 yd pass from BONNER, S. (FRANTZ, Dan kick) – 7–0 CHI
- 04:42 CHI – MICHNA, Russ 1 yd run (FRANTZ, Dan kick) – 14–0 CHI
- 03:43 ORL – TOLIVER, T.T. 55 yd kickoff return (VAUGHN, John kick failed) – 14–6 CHI
- 01:43 ORL – ALLISON, Nick 11 yd interception return (VAUGHN, John kick) – 14–13 CHI

2nd Quarter:

- 13:30 CHI – DENNARD, Ryan 27 yd pass from BONNER, S. (FRANTZ, Dan kick) – 21–13 CHI
- 06:17 ORL – JOHNSON, Ron 4 yd pass from STAFFORD, Shane (VAUGHN, John kick) – 21–20 CHI
- 00:11 ORL – HILL, Charles 17 yd pass from STAFFORD, Shane (VAUGHN, John kick) – 27–21 ORL

3rd Quarter:

- 12:00 CHI – UNERTL, Jeremy 25 yd interception return (FRANTZ, Dan kick) – 28–27 CHI
- 09:10 CHI – ALFONZO, DeJuan 10 yd fumble recovery (FRANTZ, Dan kick) – 35–27 CHI

4th Quarter:

- 14:56 ORL – TOLIVER, T.T. 25 yd pass from STAFFORD, Shane (ARMSTRONG, Odie rush) – 35–35
- 11:20 CHI – DENNARD, Ryan 9 yd pass from BONNER, S. (FRANTZ, Dan kick) – 42–35 CHI
- 08:13 ORL – TOLIVER, T.T. 7 yd pass from STAFFORD, Shane (VAUGHN, John kick) – 42–42
- 04:10 CHI – ALEXANDER, Dan 1 yd run (FRANTZ, Dan kick) – 49–42 CHI
- 00:00 ORL – GESSNER, Chas 2 yd pass from STAFFORD, Shane (VAUGHN, John kick) – 49–49

Overtime:

- 15:00 CHI – BOSS, Robert 20 yd pass from BONNER, S. (FRANTZ, Dan kick) – 56–48 CHI
- 10:38 ORL – TOLIVER, T.T. 14 yd pass from STAFFORD, Shane (MOYE-MOORE, M. rush) – 57–56 ORL
- Officials: Referee: Bill LeMonnier; Umpire: Jeff Carr; Linesman: Greg Shields; Line judge: Dave Chesney; Back judge: Jimmy Buchanan; Field judge: Buddy Ward
- Offensive Player of the Game: T.T. Toliver (ORL)
- Defensive Player of the Game: DeJuan Alfonso (CHI)
- Ironman Player of the Game: Marlon Moye-Moore (ORL)

=== Week 7: at Kansas City Brigade ===
Quarter	1	2	3	4	Total
CHI	14	14	7	14	49
KC	0	21	7	14	42

at Sprint Center, Kansas City, Missouri

- Date: April 14
- Game time: 8:30 PM EST
- Game attendance: 13,184

Game information

1st Quarter:

- 07:46 CHI – Travis LaTendresse 5 yd pass from Russ Michna (Dan Frantz kick) – 7–0 CHI
- 03:47 CHI – Damian Harrell 19 yd pass from Russ Michna (Dan Frantz kick) – 14–0 CHI

2nd Quarter:

- 14:18 KC – Charles Frederick 13 yd pass from D. Bryant (Peter Martinez kick) – 14–7 CHI
- 10:18 CHI – Donovan Morgan 3 yd pass from Russ Michna (Dan Frantz kick) – 21–7 CHI
- 07:05 KC – Mike Horacek 11 yd pass from D. Bryant (Peter Martinez kick) – 21–14 CHI
- 03:21 CHI – Russ Michna 1 yd run (Dan Frantz kick) – 28–14 CHI
- 00:49 KC – Mike Horacek 36 yd pass from D. Bryant (Peter Martinez kick) – 28–21 CHI

3rd Quarter:

- 09:11 KC – Charles Frederick 5 yd run (Peter Martinez kick) – 28–28
- 06:40 CHI – DeJuan Alfonzo 2 yd run (Dan Frantz kick) – 35–28 CHI

4th Quarter:

- 14:19 CHI – Dan Alexander 1 yd run (Dan Frantz kick) – 42–28 CHI
- 11:58 KC – Jerel Myers 9 yd pass from D. Bryant (Peter Martinez kick) – 42–35 CHI
- 03:17 KC – Dawan Moss 8 yd run (Peter Martinez kick) – 42–42
- 00:06 CHI – Travis LaTendresse 15 yd pass from Russ Michna (Dan Frantz kick) – 49–42 CHI
- Officials: Referee: Bill Athan; Umpire: Wes Fritz; Linesman: Neil Brunner; Line judge: Paul Engelberts; Back judge: Tony Lombardo
- Offensive Player of the Game: N/A
- Defensive Player of the Game: N/A
- Ironman Player of the Game: N/A

=== Week 8: vs. Grand Rapids Rampage ===
Quarter	1	2	3	4	Total
GR	7	17	7	21	52
CHI	13	14	13	15	55

at Allstate Arena, Rosemont, Illinois

- Date: April 20
- Game time: 3:00 PM EST
- Game attendance: 16,112

Game information

1st Quarter:

- 14:22 CHI – Donovan Morgan 26 yd pass from Russ Michna (Dan Frantz kick) – 7–0 CHI
- 09:12 GR – James MacPherson 1 yd run (Brian Gowins kick) – 7–7
- 03:29 CHI – DeJuan Alfonzo 1 yd run (Dan Frantz kick failed) – 13–7 CHI

2nd Quarter:

- 14:24 GR – Jermaine Lewis 16 yd pass from James MacPherson (Brian Gowins kick) – 14–13 GR
- 11:24 CHI – Dan Alexander 3 yd run (Dan Frantz kick) – 20–14 CHI
- 04:30 GR – Brian Gowins 21 yd field goal – 20–17 CHI
- 01:18 GR – Anthony Hines 3 yd pass from James MacPherson (Brian Gowins kick) – 24–20 GR
- 00:05 CHI – Donovan Morgan 6 yd pass from Russ Michna (Dan Frantz kick) – 27–24 CHI

3rd Quarter:

- 08:28 CHI – Russ Michna 1 yd run (Dan Frantz kick) – 34–24 CHI
- 05:33 GR – Kenny Higgins 26 yd pass from James MacPherson (Brian Gowins kick) – 34–31 CHI
- 03:05 CHI – Donovan Morgan 26 yd pass from Russ Michna (Dan Frantz kick blocked) – 40–31 CHI

4th Quarter:

- 12:55 GR – Kenny Higgins 26 yd pass from James MacPherson (Brian Gowins kick) – 40–38 CHI
- 11:42 GR – Jermaine Lewis 3 yd pass from James MacPherson (Brian Gowins kick) – 45–40 GR
- 08:57 CHI – Donovan Morgan 17 yd pass from Russ Michna (Travis LaTendresse pass from MICHNA) – 48–45 CHI
- 05:35 GR – Kenny Higgins 8 yd pass from James MacPherson (Brian Gowins kick) – 52–48 GR
- 01:32 CHI – Damian Harrell 14 yd pass from Russ Michna (Dan Frantz kick) – 55–52 CHI
- Officials: Referee: Pat Garvey; Umpire: Paul Frerking; Linesman: Bill Ward; Line judge: Bob McElwee; Back judge: James DeBell
- Offensive Player of the Game: Donovan Morgan (CHI)
- Defensive Player of the Game: DeJuan Alfonzo (CHI)
- Ironman Player of the Game: N/A

=== Week 9: at Colorado Crush ===
Quarter	1	2	3	4	Total
CHI	7	21	17	20	65
COL	7	14	6	25	52

at Pepsi Center, Denver, Colorado

- Date: April 25
- Game time: 9:00 PM EST
- Game attendance: 11,114

Game information

1st Quarter:

- 06:30 COL – OWENS 4 yd run (RUSH kick) – 7–0 COL
- 02:12 CHI – MOYER 1 yd run (FRANTZ kick) – 7–7

2nd Quarter:

- 12:16 COL – OWENS 23 yd pass from DUTTON (RUSH kick) – 14–7 COL
- 09:34 CHI – ALEXANDER 15 yd pass from MICHNA (FRANTZ kick) – 14–14
- 06:19 COL – PYATT 19 yd pass from DUTTON (RUSH kick) – 21–14 COL
- 05:30 CHI – ALFONZO 11 yd kickoff return (FRANTZ kick) – 21–21
- 00:06 CHI – MICHNA 1 yd run (FRANTZ kick) – 28–21 CHI

3rd Quarter:

- 13:59 CHI – HARRELL 4 yd pass from MICHNA (FRANTZ kick) – 35–21 CHI
- 11:07 CHI – MORGAN 4 yd pass from MICHNA (FRANTZ kick) – 42–21 CHI
- 07:42 COL – QUINNIE 9 yd pass from DUTTON (RUSH kick failed) – 42–27 CHI
- 03:59 CHI – FRANTZ 34 yd field goal – 45–27 CHI

4th Quarter:

- 13:39 CHI – HARRELL 9 yd pass from MICHNA (FRANTZ kick) – 52–27 CHI
- 12:11 COL – PYATT 42 yd pass from DUTTON (RUSH kick failed) – 52–33 CHI
- 06:54 COL – OWENS 10 yd pass from DUTTON (RUSH kick failed) – 52–39 CHI
- 05:58 CHI – MORGAN 23 yd pass from MICHNA (FRANTZ kick) – 59–39 CHI
- 02:38 COL – QUINNIE 23 yd pass from DUTTON (RUSH kick) – 59–46 CHI
- 00:51 CHI – LATENDRESSE 17 yd pass from MICHNA (FRANTZ kick blocked) – 65–46 CHI
- 00:17 COL – QUINNIE 5 yd pass from DUTTON (DUTTON drop-kick failed) – 65–52 CHI
- Officials: Referee: Bill McCabe; Umpire: Paul Frerking; Linesman: Shawn Hochuli; Line judge: Dirk Bell; Back judge: Jimmy Buchanan
- Offensive Player of the Game: N/A
- Defensive Player of the Game: N/A
- Ironman Player of the Game: N/A

=== Week 10: at Tampa Bay Storm ===
Quarter	1	2	3	4	Total
CHI	7	17	13	14	51
TB	7	17	6	16	46

at St. Pete Times Forum, Tampa, Florida

- Date: May 5
- Game time: 8:00 PM EST
- Game attendance: 14,491

Game information

1st Quarter:

- 10:53 TB – SAMUELS, Lawren 14 yd pass from DIETZ, Brett (MARLER, Seth kick) – 7–0 TB
- 05:45 CHI – ALEXANDER, Dan 2 yd run (FRANTZ, Dan kick) – 7–7

2nd Quarter:

- 12:37 TB – MARLER, Seth 22 yd field goal – 10–7 TB
- 11:34 CHI – LA TENDRESSE, T 29 yd pass from MICHNA, Russ (FRANTZ, Dan kick) – 14–10 CHI
- 08:18 TB – SAMUELS, Lawren 16 yd pass from DIETZ, Brett (MARLER, Seth kick) – 17–14 TB
- 06:21 CHI – LA TENDRESSE, T 7 yd pass from MICHNA, Russ (FRANTZ, Dan kick) – 21–17 CHI
- 00:40 TB – MARSHALL, Torra 7 yd fumble recovery (MARLER, Seth kick) – 24–21 TB
- 00:00 CHI – FRANTZ, Dan 26 yd field goal – 24–24

3rd Quarter:

- 10:24 CHI – LA TENDRESSE, T 8 yd pass from MICHNA, Russ (FRANTZ, Dan kick) – 31–24 CHI
- 08:40 CHI – MICHNA, Russ 25 yd run (FRANTZ, Dan kick failed) – 37–24 CHI
- 06:33 TB – MARSHALL, Torra 2 yd run (MARLER, Seth kick failed) – 37–30 CHI

4th Quarter:

- 09:25 TB – MARLER, Seth 20 yd field goal – 37–33 CHI
- 08:47 CHI – HARRELL, Damian 11 yd pass from MICHNA, Russ (FRANTZ, Dan kick) – 44–33 CHI
- 02:47 TB – MARSHALL, Torra 1 yd run (MARLER, Seth kick failed) – 44–39 CHI
- 00:54 CHI – MICHNA, Russ 6 yd run (FRANTZ, Dan kick) – 51–39 CHI
- 00:28 TB – ROBINSON, Sedri 5 yd pass from DIETZ, Brett (MARLER, Seth kick) – 51–46 CHI
- Officials: Referee: Tom McCabe; Umpire: Rick Podraza; Linesman: Rod Pearson; Line judge: Dana McKenzie; Back judge: Scott Helverson
- Offensive Player of the Game: Travis Latendresse (CHI)
- Defensive Player of the Game: Torrance Marshall (TB)
- Ironman Player of the Game: Lawrence Samuels (TB)

=== Week 11 ===
Bye Week

=== Week 12: vs. Los Angeles Avengers ===
Quarter	1	2	3	4	Total
LA	7	7	7	7	28
CHI	20	24	14	14	72

at Allstate Arena, Rosemont, Illinois

- Date: May 19
- Game time: 8:00 PM EST
- Game attendance: 15,904

Game information

1st Quarter:

- 13:16 CHI – ALEXANDER 13 yd run (FRANTZ kick) – 7–0 CHI
- 11:03 CHI – ALEXANDER 14 yd pass from MICHNA (FRANTZ kick) – 14–0 CHI
- 03:54 LA – JEFFRIES 2 yd run (FREDRICKSON kick) – 14–7 CHI
- 00:00 CHI – MORGAN 22 yd pass from MICHNA (FRANTZ kick blocked) – 20–7 CHI

2nd Quarter:

- 08:39 LA – PERKINS 1 yd pass from T. HICKS (FREDRICKSON kick) – 20–14 CHI
- 04:00 CHI – ALEXANDER 1 yd run (FRANTZ kick) – 27–14 CHI
- 02:49 CHI – TEAM safety – 29–14 CHI
- 02:16 CHI – LATENDRESSE 21 yd pass from MICHNA (FRANTZ kick failed) – 35–14 CHI
- 00:43 CHI – PETERS safety – 37–14 CHI
- 00:02 CHI – LATENDRESSE 11 yd pass from MICHNA (FRANTZ kick) – 44–14 CHI

3rd Quarter:

- 13:15 LA – INGRAM 0 yd fumble recovery (FREDRICKSON kick) – 44–21 CHI
- 09:15 CHI – HARRELL 4 yd pass from MICHNA (FRANTZ kick) – 51–21 CHI
- 02:20 CHI – LATENDRESSE 27 yd pass from MICHNA (FRANTZ kick) – 58–21 CHI

4th Quarter:

- 13:33 LA – WARD 9 yd pass from CUMBIE (FREDRICKSON kick) – 58–28 CHI
- 09:07 CHI – UNERTL 47 yd interception return (FRANTZ kick) – 65–28 CHI
- 05:53 CHI – ROBINSON 26 yd interception return (FRANTZ kick) – 72–28 CHI
- Officials: Referee: Dennis Lipski; Umpire: Rick Nelson; Linesman: Brent Durbin; Line judge: Darrel Leftwich; Back judge: Reggie Smith
- Offensive Player of the Game: N/A
- Defensive Player of the Game: N/A
- Ironman Player of the Game: N/A

=== Week 13: at Utah Blaze ===
Quarter	1	2	3	4	Total
CHI	6	18	10	14	48
UTA	21	13	7	10	51

at EnergySolutions Arena, Salt Lake City, Utah

- Date: May 24
- Game time: 9:00 PM EST
- Game attendance: 15,295

Game information

1st Quarter:

- 10:15 UTA – BOONE 9 yd pass from GERMAINE (VIDETICH kick) – 7–0 UTA
- 09:04 UTA – FILER 3 yd run (VIDETICH kick) – 14–0 UTA
- 04:08 UTA – MCKELVEY 22 yd pass from GERMAINE (VIDETICH kick) – 21–0 UTA
- 01:10 CHI – MORGAN 7 yd pass from MICHNA (FRANTZ kick failed) – 21–6 UTA

2nd Quarter:

- 12:07 CHI – ORDWAY 55 yd missed FG return (MICHNA rush) – 21–14 UTA
- 06:04 UTA – BOONE 17 yd pass from GERMAINE (VIDETICH kick) – 28–14 UTA
- 00:58 CHI – MORGAN 5 yd pass from MICHNA (FRANTZ kick) – 28–21 UTA
- 00:24 UTA – WHITTAKER 21 yd pass from GERMAINE (VIDETICH kick failed) – 34–21 UTA
- 00:00 CHI – FRANTZ 41 yd field goal – 34–24 UTA

3rd Quarter:

- 14:30 CHI – HARRELL 45 yd pass from MICHNA (FRANTZ kick) – 34–31 UTA
- 10:44 UTA – FILER 1 yd run (VIDETICH kick) – 41–31 UTA
- 05:30 CHI – FRANTZ 22 yd field goal – 41–34 UTA

4th Quarter:

- 10:08 CHI – HARRELL 3 yd pass from MICHNA (FRANTZ kick) – 41–41
- 01:57 UTA – MCKELVEY 4 yd pass from GERMAINE (VIDETICH kick) – 48–41 UTA
- 00:43 CHI – MORGAN 6 yd pass from MICHNA (FRANTZ kick) – 48–48
- 00:00 UTA – VIDETICH 18 yd field goal – 51–48 UTA
- Officials: Referee: Tom McCabe; Umpire: Rick Podraza; Linesman: Rod Pearson; Line judge: Dana McKenzie; Back judge: Scott Helverson
- Offensive Player of the Game: Joe Germaine (UTA)
- Defensive Player of the Game: Damon Mason (UTA)
- Ironman Player of the Game: Steve Videtich (UTA)

=== Week 14: vs. Kansas City Brigade ===
Quarter	1	2	3	4	Total
KC	20	14	0	13	47
CHI	14	14	7	17	52

at Allstate Arena, Rosemont, Illinois

- Date: May 31
- Game time: 8:00 PM EST
- Game attendance: 16,164

Game information

1st Quarter:

- 12:33 KC – Charles Frederick 23 yd pass from D. Bryant (Peter Martinez kick failed) – 6–0 KC
- 08:15 CHI – Damian Harrell 11 yd pass from Russ Michna (Dan Frantz kick) – 7–6 CHI
- 06:57 KC – Dawan Moss 30 yd run (Peter Martinez kick) – 13–7 KC
- 04:11 CHI – Travis LaTendresse 1 yd run (Dan Frantz kick) – 14–13 CHI
- 00:24 KC – Ces'are Manning 8 yd pass from D. Bryant (Peter Martinez kick) 20–14 KC

2nd Quarter:

- 13:10 CHI – Damian Harrell 5 yd pass from Russ Michna (Dan Frantz kick) – 21–20 CHI
- 06:22 KC – D. Bryant 1 yd run (Peter Martinez kick) – 27–21 KC
- 02:15 KC – Jerel Myers 1 yd pass from D. Bryant (Peter Martinez kick) – 34–21 KC
- 00:03 CHI – Donovan Morgan 3 yd pass from Russ Michna (Dan Frantz kick) – 34–28 KC

3rd Quarter:

- 01:23 CHI – Travis LaTendresse 30 yd pass from Russ Michna (Dan Frantz kick) – 35–34 CHI

4th Quarter:

- 13:35 KC – Jamarr Ward 7 yd pass from D. Bryant (Peter Martinez kick) – 41–35 – 41–35 KC
- 09:21 KC – Chris Demaree 42 yd interception return (Peter Martinez kick blocked) – 47–35 KC
- 06:15 CHI – Donovan Morgan 5 yd pass from Russ Michna (Dan Frantz kick) – 47–42 KC
- 00:11 CHI – Russ Michna 1 yd run (Travis LaTendresse pass from MICHNA) – 50–47 CHI
- 00:04 CHI – TEAM safety – 52–47 CHI
- Officials: Referee: Dave Lambros; Umpire: Paul Frerking; Linesman: Kelly Saalfeld; Line judge: Brian Matthew; Back judge: Rich Wilborn
- Offensive Player of the Game: Russ Michna (CHI)
- Defensive Player of the Game: Dennison Robinson (CHI)
- Ironman Player of the Game: N/A

=== Week 15: at Cleveland Gladiators ===
Quarter	1	2	3	4	Total
CHI	7	10	7	20	44
CLE	21	17	7	20	65

at Quicken Loans Arena, Cleveland, Ohio

- Date: June 7
- Game time: 7:00 PM EST
- Game attendance: 11,377

Game information

1st Quarter:

- 14:38 CLE – Otis Amey 45 yd pass from Raymond Philyaw (Jason Ball kick) – 7–0 CLE
- 11:56 CHI – Donovan Morgan 9 yd pass from Russ Michna (Paul Edinger kick) – 7–7
- 06:37 CLE – Joe Minucci 5 yd pass from Raymond Philyaw (Jason Ball kick) – 14–7 CLE
- 02:23 CLE – Otis Amey 50 yd missed FG return (Jason Ball kick) – 21–7 CLE

2nd Quarter:

- 11:39 CLE – Brandon Hefflin 45 yd interception return (Jason Ball kick) – 28–7 CLE
- 07:38 CHI – Paul Edinger 21 yd field goal – 28–10 CLE
- 05:45 CLE – Otis Amey 34 yd pass from Raymond Philyaw (Jason Ball kick) – 35–10 CLE
- 02:47 CHI – Travis LaTendresse 16 yd pass from Russ Michna (Paul Edinger kick) – 35–17 CLE
- 00:00 CLE – Jason Ball 19 yd field goal – 38–17 CLE

3rd Quarter:

- 10:17 CHI – Robert Boss 8 yd pass from Russ Michna (Paul Edinger kick) – 38–24 CLE
- 06:20 CLE – Otis Amey 13 yd pass from Raymond Philyaw (Jason Ball kick) – 45–24 CLE

4th Quarter:

- 14:19 CLE – Robert Redd 0 yd fumble recovery (Jason Ball kick blocked) – 51–24 CLE
- 12:24 CHI – Travis LaTendresse 12 yd pass from Russ Michna (Paul Edinger kick failed) – 51–30 CLE
- 08:02 CLE – Robert Redd 28 yd pass from Raymond Philyaw (Jason Ball kick) – 58–30 CLE
- 04:40 CHI – Travis LaTendresse 7 yd pass from Russ Michna (Paul Edinger kick) – 58–37 CLE
- 02:36 CLE – Ron Johnson 9 yd pass from Rohan Davey (Jason Ball kick) – 65–37 CLE
- 00:51 CHI – Damien Harrell 17 yd pass from Russ Michna (Paul Edinger kick) – 65–44 CLE
- Officials: Referee: Pat Garvey; Umpire: Paul King; Linesman: Bill Ward; Line judge: Bob McElwee; Back judge: James DeBell
- Offensive Player of the Game: Raymond Philyaw (CLE)
- Defensive Player of the Game: Brandon Hefflin (CLE)
- Ironman Player of the Game: Otis Amey (CLE)

=== Week 16: at Georgia Force ===
Quarter	1	2	3	4	Total
CHI	6	14	14	13	47
GA	14	13	7	16	50

at The Arena at Gwinnett Center, Duluth, Georgia

- Date: June 14
- Game time: 7:00 PM EST
- Game attendance: 11,073

Game information

1st Quarter:

- 10:22 GA – MORRIS, Carl 6 yd pass from GREISEN, Chris (MARTINEZ, Carlo kick) – 7–0 GA
- 06:30 CHI – MORGAN, Donovan 2 yd run (O'DONNELL, Joe kick failed) – 7–6 GA
- 05:25 GA – MORRIS, Carl 30 yd pass from GREISEN, Chris (MARTINEZ, Carlo kick) – 14–6 GA

2nd Quarter:

- 08:17 GA – MORRIS, Carl 21 yd pass from GREISEN, Chris (MARTINEZ, Carlo kick failed) – 20–6 GA
- 04:57 CHI – LATENDRESSE, Tra 24 yd pass from MICHNA, Russ (O'DONNELL, Joe kick) – 20–13 GA
- 01:14 GA – BERGERON, Troy 7 yd pass from GREISEN, Chris (MARTINEZ, Carlo kick) – 27–13 GA
- 00:00 CHI – MORGAN, Donovan 3 yd pass from MICHNA, Russ (O'DONNELL, Joe kick) – 27–20 GA

3rd Quarter:

- 10:45 CHI – LATENDRESSE, Tra 22 yd pass from MICHNA, Russ (O'DONNELL, Joe kick) – 27–27
- 06:20 GA – GRICE, Shane 7 yd pass from GREISEN, Chris (MARTINEZ, Carlo kick) – 34–27 GA
- 04:34 CHI – MORGAN, Donovan 33 yd pass from MICHNA, Russ (O'DONNELL, Joe kick) – 34–34

4th Quarter:

- 14:14 GA – MORRIS, Carl 4 yd pass from GREISEN, Chris (MARTINEZ, Carlo kick) – 41–34 GA
- 09:47 CHI – MICHNA, Russ 4 yd run (O'DONNELL, Joe kick) – 41–41
- 05:50 GA – GREISEN, Chris 14 yd run (MARTINEZ, Carlo kick) – 48–41 GA
- 03:07 GA – THOMPSON, Will safety – 50–41 GA
- 00:43 CHI – MORGAN, Donovan 3 yd pass from MICHNA, Russ (O'DONNELL, Joe kick failed) – 50–47 GA
- Officials: Referee: Bill Mccabe; Umpire: Wes Fritz; Linesman: Neil Brunner; Line judge: Paul Engleberts; Back judge: Tony Lombardo
- Offensive Player of the Game: Chris Greisen (GA)
- Defensive Player of the Game: Will Thompson (GA)
- Ironman Player of the Game: Carl Morris (GA)

=== Week 17: vs. Dallas Desperados ===
Quarter	1	2	3	4	Total
DAL	14	21	0	28	63
CHI	21	14	13	27	75

at Allstate Arena, Rosemont, Illinois

- Date: June 22
- Game time: 4:00 PM EST
- Game attendance: 16,260

Game information

1st Quarter:

- 14:47 CHI – Dan Alexander 0 yd fumble recovery (Todd France kick) – 7–0 CHI
- 13:56 DAL – Josh Bush 56 yd kickoff return (Remy Hamilton kick) – 7–7
- 09:04 CHI – Dan Alexander 1 yd run (Todd France kick) – 14–7 CHI
- 04:26 DAL – Marcus Nash 22 yd pass from Clint Dolezel (Remy Hamilton kick) – 14–14
- 00:41 CHI – Donovan Morgan 5 yd pass from Russ Michna (Todd France kick) – 21–14 CHI

2nd Quarter:

- 11:04 DAL – Anthony Armstrong 8 yd pass from Clint Dolezel (Remy Hamilton kick) – 21–21
- 07:22 CHI – Damian Harrell 19 yd pass from Russ Michna (Todd France kick) – 28–21 CHI
- 03:21 DAL – Andrae Thurman 10 yd pass from Clint Dolezel (Remy Hamilton kick) – 28–28
- 00:41 CHI – Donovan Morgan 3 yd pass from Russ Michna (Todd France kick) – 35–28 CHI
- 00:00 DAL – Marcus Nash 7 yd pass from Clint Dolezel (Remy Hamilton kick) – 35–35

3rd Quarter:

- 09:46 CHI – Damian Harrell 5 yd pass from Russ Michna (Todd France kick) – 42–35 CHI
- 03:42 CHI – Russ Michna 1 yd run (Todd France kick failed) – 48–35 CHI

4th Quarter:

- 13:11 CHI – John Peaua 3 yd run (Todd France kick) – 55–35 CHI
- 09:30 DAL – Chris Sanders 2 yd run (Remy Hamilton kick) – 55–42 CHI
- 08:23 CHI – Russ Michna 1 yd run (Todd France kick) – 62–42 CHI
- 04:27 DAL – Andrae Thurman 15 yd pass from Chris Sanders (Remy Hamilton kick) – 62–49 CHI
- 03:08 CHI – Donovan Morgan 32 yd pass from Sherdrick Bonner (Todd France kick) – 69–49 CHI
- 00:51 DAL – Marcus Nash 9 yd pass from Chris Sanders (Remy Hamilton kick) – 69–56 CHI
- 00:43 CHI – Jonathan Ordway 57 yd kickoff return (Todd France kick blocked) – 75–56 CHI
- 00:00 DAL – Chris Sanders 8 yd run (Remy Hamilton kick) – 75–63 CHI
- Officials: Tom McCabe; Umpire: Rich Podraza; Linesman: Rod Pearson; Line judge: Dana McKinzie; Back judge: Tony Lombardo
- Offensive Player of the Game: Donovan Morgan (CHI)
- Defensive Player of the Game: Liam Ezekial (CHI)
- Ironman Player of the Game: Dan Alexander (CHI)

== Playoffs ==
=== American Conference Divisional: vs. (6) Grand Rapids Rampage ===
Quarter	1	2	3	4	Total
(6) GR	14	17	7	20	58
(1) CHI	7	14	14	6	41

at Allstate Arena, Rosemont, Illinois

- Date: July 6
- Game time: 3:00 PM EST
- Game attendance: TBA

Game information

1st Quarter:

- 13:55 CHI – Travis Latendresse 33 Yd Pass From Russ Michna (Todd France Kick) – 7–0 CHI
- 10:48 GR – Jason Shelley 24 Yd Pass From James Macpherson (Brian Gowins Kick) – 7–7
- 04:04 GR – Cole Magner 4 Yd Pass From James Macpherson (Brian Gowins Kick) – 14–7 GR

2nd Quarter:

- 12:52 CHI – Donovan Morgan 2 Yd Pass From Russ Michna (Todd France Kick) – 14–14
- 09:44 GR – Kenny Higgins 24 Yd Pass From James Macpherson (Brian Gowins Kick) – 21–14 GR
- 07:47 CHI – Travis Latendresse 27 Yd Pass From Russ Michna (Todd France Kick) – 21–21
- 03:10 GR – Kenny Higgins 11 Yd Pass From James Macpherson (Brian Gowins Kick) – 28–21 GR
- 00:00 GR – Brian Gowins 25 Yd Field Goal – 31–21 GR

3rd Quarter:

- 10:03 CHI – Travis Latendresse 19 Yd Pass From Russ Michna (Todd France Kick) – 31–28 GR
- 05:59 GR – Kenny Higgins 3 Yd Pass From James Macpherson (Brian Gowins Kick) – 38–28 GR
- 03:17 CHI – Dan Alexander 2 Yd Run (Todd France Kick) – 38–35 GR

4th Quarter:

- 13:00 GR – James Macpherson 1 Yd Run (Brian Gowins Kick) – 45–35 GR
- 04:49 GR – Terrell Browden 1 Yd Run (Brian Gowins Kick Failed) – 51–35 GR
- 03:17 CHI – Donovan Morgan 17 Yd Pass From Russ Michna (Two-Point Conversion Failed) – 51–41 GR
- 01:27 GR – Cole Magner 3 Yd Pass From James Macpherson (Brian Gowins Kick) – 58–41 GR
- Officials: TBA
- Offensive Player of the Game: James MacPherson (GR)
- Defensive Player of the Game: William Haith (GR)
- Ironman Player of the Game: N/A
