= 2008 Grand Rapids Rampage season =

Arena Football League team season

- Head coach: Steve Thonn
- Home stadium: Van Andel Arena

Results
- Record: 6–10
- Division place: 2nd
- Playoffs: Won Wild Card Playoffs (Rattlers) 48–41; Won Divisional Playoffs (Rush) 58–41; Lost Conference Championship (SaberCats) 55–81

The 2008 Grand Rapids Rampage season was the 11th season for the franchise. The Rampage finished the regular season 6–10, earning them a spot in the playoffs as the 6th seed in the American Conference. In their Wild Card playoff game, the Rampage upset the Arizona Rattlers, 48–41. In the Divisional round, the Rampage won in a bigger upset against the top seeded Chicago Rush, 58–41. The Rampage's playoff run was cut short however, after losing the American Conference Championship to defending champion San Jose SaberCats, 55–81. With the ballclub's folding in 2010, this was the franchise's final season.

== Standings ==
Central Division
Team	W	L	PCT	PF	PA	DIV	CON	Home	Away
z-Chicago Rush	11	5	.688	926	765	6–0	9–1	7–1	4–4
x-Colorado Crush	6	10	.375	847	907	2–4	4–6	4–4	2–6
x-Grand Rapids Rampage	6	10	.375	952	968	3–3	4–6	3–5	3–5
Kansas City Brigade	3	13	.188	752	923	1–5	1–9	2–6	1–7

z - Clinched division and conference's best record
x - Clinched playoff berth

== Regular season schedule ==
Week	Date	Opponent	Result	Record	Location	Attendance	Recap
1	Bye Week						
2	March 10	San Jose SaberCats	L 58–66	0–1	Van Andel Arena	5,833	Recap
3	March 14	Chicago Rush	L 35–64	0–2	Van Andel Arena	10,594	Recap
4	March 24	at Kansas City Brigade	W 92–52	1–2	Sprint Center	12,943	Recap
5	March 30	Los Angeles Avengers	W 84–59	2–2	Van Andel Arena	5,818	Recap
6	April 5	at New York Dragons	L 34–63	2–3	Nassau Coliseum	8,211	Recap
7	April 13	Orlando Predators	L 56–75	2–4	Van Andel Arena	6,946	Recap
8	April 20	at Chicago Rush	L 52–55	2–5	Allstate Arena	16,112	Recap
9	April 25	Kansas City Brigade	W 72–38	3–5	Van Andel Arena	8,102	Recap
10	May 2	at Colorado Crush	L 28–63	3–6	Pepsi Center	14,527	Recap
11	May 10	at Dallas Desperados	L 54–65	3–7	American Airlines Center	11,476	Recap
12	May 16	Tampa Bay Storm	L 50–58	3–8	Van Andel Arena	7,205	Recap
13	May 24	at Arizona Rattlers	L 48–52	3–9	US Airways Center	12,559	Recap
14	June 1	Utah Blaze	L 56–63	3–10	Van Andel Arena	5,252	Recap
15	June 7	Colorado Crush	W 84–65	4–10	Van Andel Arena	7,766	Recap
16	June 14	at Columbus Destroyers	W 63–60	5–10	Nationwide Arena	12,831	Recap
17	June 21	at New Orleans VooDoo	W 86–70	6–10	New Orleans Arena	17,006	Recap

== Playoff schedule ==
Round	Date	Opponent (seed)	Result	Location	Attendance	Recap
AC Wild Card	June 30	at Arizona Rattlers (3)	W 48–41	US Airways Center	10,862	Recap
AC Divisional	July 6	at Chicago Rush (1)	W 58–41	Allstate Arena	14,338	Recap
AC Championship	July 12	at San Jose SaberCats (2)	L 55–81	HP Pavilion	14,072	Recap

== Final roster ==
2008 Grand Rapids Rampage roster
Quarterbacks: 12 Tom Arth; 16 James MacPherson; Fullbacks: 47 Whitney Bell; 11 Terrell Browden; Wide receivers: 6 Kenny Higgins; 4 Jermaine Lewis; 21 Cole Magner; 18 Jason Shelley	Offensive linemen: 79 Josh Sewell; 55 Nick Steitz; 67 Fitu Tu'ua; 73 T. J. Watkins; Defensive linemen: 97 Donovan Arp; 91 George Gause; 95 Tom Johnson; 99 Zach Ville	Linebackers: 40 Michael McFadden; 43 Leif Murphy; Defensive backs: 3 Ryan Bowers; 19 Ronald Dillon; 2 William Haith; 1 Ahmad Hawkins; 7 Chris Martin; Kickers: 13 Brian Gowins	Injured reserve: 90 Jason Holman DL (IR); 78 Reggie Jiles OL (IR); 8 Chris Johnson WR (IR); 75 Marcus Keyes OL (IR); 34 Alan Krutulis FB (IR); 95 Juan Porter OL (IR); 36 Chris Ryan FB (IR); Other league exempt: Currently vacant; Practice Squad: 77 Gary Jenkins OL; 76 Derrick Mackray OL; Rookies in italics Roster updated July 9, 2008; 24 Active, 7 Inactive, 2 PS

== Regular season ==
=== Week 1 ===
Bye Week

=== Week 2: vs. San Jose SaberCats ===
Quarter	1	2	3	4	Total
SJ	14	21	14	17	66
GR	13	17	14	14	58

at Van Andel Arena, Grand Rapids, Michigan

- Date: March 10
- Game time: 7:00 PM EST
- Game attendance: 5,833

Game information

1st Quarter:

- 12:20 GR – HINES 15 yd pass from MCPHERSON (GOWINS kick failed) 6–0 GR
- 11:38 GR – HIGGINS 2 yd net recovery (GOWINS kick) – 13–0 GR
- 08:05 SJ – James Roe 8 yd pass from Mark Grieb (A.J. Haglund kick) – 13–7 GR
- 04:38 SJ – Ron Jones 12 yd fumble recovery (A.J. Haglund kick) 14–13 SJ

2nd Quarter:

- 14:22 SJ – Phil Glover 1 yd run (A.J. Haglund kick) – 21–13 SJ
- 10:20 GR – MCPHERSON 1 yd run (GOWINS kick) – 21–20 SJ
- 06:14 SJ – Rodney Wright 6 yd pass from Mark Grieb (A.J. Haglund kick) – 28–20 SJ
- 00:55 GR – MCPHERSON 1 yd run (GOWINS kick) – 28–27 SJ
- 00:45 SJ – Phil Glover 3 yd run (A.J. Haglund kick) – 35–27 SJ
- 00:05 GR – GOWINS 41 yd field goal – 35–30 SJ

3rd Quarter:

- 11:31 GR – HIGGINS 26 yd pass from MCPHERSON (GOWINS kick) – 37–35 GR
- 08:42 SJ – Rodney Wright 22 yd pass from Mark Grieb (A.J. Haglund kick) – 42–37 SJ
- 06:45 SJ – James Roe 2 yd pass from Mark Grieb (A.J. Haglund kick) – 49–37 SJ
- 04:18 GR – HIGGINS 22 yd pass from MCPHERSON (GOWINS kick) – 49–44 SJ

4th Quarter:

- 14:18 SJ – A.J. Haglund 23 yd field goal – 52–44 SJ
- 12:50 GR – HIGGINS 47 yd pass from MCPHERSON (GOWINS kick) – 52–51 SJ
- 08:52 SJ – Chris Pino 6 yd pass from Mark Grieb (A.J. Haglund kick) – 59–51 SJ
- 08:05 GR – HAWKINS 52 yd kickoff return (GOWINS kick) – 59–58 SJ
- 06:42 SJ – Rodney Wright 27 yd pass from Mark Grieb (A.J. Haglund kick) – 66–58 SJ
- Officials: Referee: Bill LeMonnier; Umpire: Jeff Carr; Linesman: Greg Shields; Line judge: Dave Chesney; Back judge: Billy Beckett
- Offensive Player of the Game: Mark Grieb (SJ)
- Defensive Player of the Game: Clevan Thomas (SJ)
- Ironman Player of the Game: Ahmad Hawkins (GR)

=== Week 3: vs. Chicago Rush ===
Quarter	1	2	3	4	Total
CHI	22	7	14	21	64
GR	7	0	7	21	35

at Van Andel Arena, Grand Rapids, Michigan

- Date: March 14
- Game time: 7:00 PM EST
- Game attendance: 10,594

Game information

1st Quarter:

- 14:22 CHI – MOYER safety – 2–0 CHI
- 13:44 CHI – HARRELL 45 yd pass from MICHNA (FRANTZ kick failed) – 8–0 CHI
- 12:56 CHI – ALFONZO 5 yd net recovery (FRANTZ kick) – 15–0 CHI
- 08:24 CHI – HARRELL 22 yd pass from MICHNA (FRANTZ kick) – 22–0 CHI
- 05:00 GR – MCPHERSON 10 yd run (HOULE kick) – 22–7 CHI

2nd Quarter:

- 00:11 CHI – ALFONZO 2 yd run (FRANTZ kick) – 29–7 CHI

3rd Quarter:

- 10:56 CHI – MORGAN 9 yd pass from MICHNA (FRANTZ kick) – 36–7 CHI
- 04:37 GR – HINES 10 yd pass from MACPHERSON (HOULE kick) – 36–14 CHI
- 00:04 CHI – ALEXANDER 3 yd run (FRANTZ kick) – 43–14 CHI

4th Quarter:

- 10:54 GRA – JOHNSON 5 yd pass from MACPHERSON (HOULE kick failed) – 43–20 CHI
- 09:58 CHI – LATENDRESSE 26 yd pass from MICHNA (FRANTZ kick) – 50–20 CHI
- 07:22 GRA – HIGGINS 12 yd pass from MACPHERSON (HINES pass from MACPHERSON) – 50–28 CHI
- 04:53 CHI – DENNARD 26 yd pass from MICHNA (FRANTZ kick) – 57–28 CHI
- 00:56 CHI – ROBINSON 45 yd interception return (FRANTZ kick) – 64–28 CHI
- 00:15 GRA – HIGGINS 5 yd pass from MACPHERSON (HOULE kick) – 64–35 CHI
- Officials: Referee: Tom McCabe; Umpire: Wes Fritz; Linesman: Neil Brunner; Line judge: Paul Engelberts; Back judge: Tony Lombardo
- Offensive Player of the Game: Russ Michina (CHI)
- Defensive Player of the Game: John Moyer (CHI)
- Ironman Player of the Game: DeJuan Alfonzo (CHI)

=== Week 4: at Kansas City Brigade ===
Quarter	1	2	3	4	Total
GR	14	34	23	21	92
KC	17	14	7	14	52

at Sprint Center, Kansas City, Missouri

- Date: March 24
- Game time: 8:00 PM EST
- Game attendance: 12,943

Game information

1st Quarter:

- 11:51 KC – Peter Martinez 29 yd field goal – 3–0 KC
- 11:29 GR – Anthony Hines 30 yd pass from James MacPherson (Brian Gowins kick) – 7–3 GR
- 10:29 KC – Jerel Myers 30 yd pass from Matt Kohn (Peter Martinez kick) – 10–7 KC
- 07:05 GR – T.J. Watkins 2 yd pass from James MacPherson (Brian Gowins kick) – 14–10 GR
- 03:08 KC – Mike Horacek 19 yd pass from Matt Kohn (Peter Martinez kick) – 17–14 KC

2nd Quarter:

- 14:54 GR – Kenny Higgins 28 yd pass from James MacPherson (Brian Gowins kick) – 21–17 GR
- 09:48 GR – Chris Johnson 10 yd pass from James MacPherson (Brian Gowins kick) – 28–17 GR
- 07:00 KC – Charles Frederick 3 yd run (Peter Martinez kick) – 28–24 GR
- 03:40 GR – Anthony Hines 15 yd pass from James MacPherson (Brian Gowins kick) 35–24 GR
- 02:59 GR – Kenny Higgins 0 yd fumble recovery (Brian Gowins kick) – 42–24 GR
- 00:58 KC – Matt Kohn 1 yd run (Peter Martinez kick) – 42–31 GR
- 00:21 GR – Anthony Hines 17 yd pass from James MacPherson (Brian Gowins kick failed) – 48–31 GR

3rd Quarter:

- 11:11 GR – Anthony Hines 5 yd pass from James MacPherson (Brian Gowins kick) – 55–31 GR
- 09:25 GR – TEAM safety – 57–31 GR
- 07:03 GR – Chris Johnson 4 yd pass from James MacPherson (Brian Gowins kick) – 64–31 GR
- 03:17 KC – Jerel Myers 5 yd pass from Matt Kohn (Peter Martinez kick) – 64–31 GR
- 00:22 GR – Jermaine Lewis 12 yd pass from James MacPherson (Brian Gowins kick) – 71–38 GR

4th Quarter:

- 14:38 GR – Adrian McPherson 4 yd run (Brian Gowins kick) – 78–38 GR
- 12:49 KC – James Robinson 4 yd pass from Matt Kohn (Peter Martinez kick) – 78–45 GR
- 11:47 GR – Chris Johnson 11 yd run (Brian Gowins kick) – 85–45 GR
- 07:57 GR – Adrian McPherson 20 yd run (Brian Gowins kick) – 92–45 GR
- 00:02 KC – Matt Kohn 8 yd run (Peter Martinez kick) – 92–52 GR
- Officials: Referee: Dave Lambros; Umpire: Doug Wilson; Linesman: Kelly Saalfeld; Line judge: Brian Matthew; Back judge: Rich Wilborn
- Offensive Player of the Game: James Macpherson (GR)
- Defensive Player of the Game: Ahmed Hawkins (GR)
- Ironman Player of the Game: Kenny Higgins (GR)

=== Week 5: vs. Los Angeles Avengers ===
Quarter	1	2	3	4	Total
LA	14	16	8	21	59
GR	28	28	14	14	84

at Van Andel Arena, Grand Rapids, Michigan

- Date: March 30
- Game time: 2:00 PM EST
- Game attendance: 5,818

Game information

1st Quarter:

- 14:48 GRA – MARTIN 55 yd kickoff return (GOWINS kick) – 7–0 GR
- 13:18 GR – JOHNSON 25 yd pass from MACPHERSON (GOWINS kick) – 14–0 GR
- 09:56 GR – BELL 1 yd run (GOWINS kick) – 21–0 GR
- 05:45 LA – TOLVER 5 yd pass from CUMBIE (DAVIS kick) – 21–7 GR
- 01:34 LA – HARRELL 6 yd pass from CUMBIE (DAVIS kick) – 21–14 GR
- 00:47 GR – MARTIN 54 yd kickoff return (GOWINS kick) – 28–14 GR

2nd Quarter:

- 14:10 LA – INGRAM 30 yd pass from CUMBIE (DAVIS kick) – 28–21 GR
- 11:30 GR – JOHNSON 17 yd pass from MACPHERSON (GOWINS kick) – 35–21 GR
- 07:40 GR – BELL 2 yd run (GOWINS kick) – 42–21 GR
- 03:50 GR – HIGGINS 8 yd pass from MACPHERSON (GOWINS kick) 49–21 GR
- 00:59 LA – INGRAM 4 yd pass from CUMBIE (DAVIS kick failed) – 49–27 GR
- 00:24 GR – HIGGINS 3 yd pass from MACPHERSON (GOWINS kick) – 56–27 GR
- 00:00 LA – DAVIS 38 yd field goal – 56–30 GR

3rd Quarter:

- 11:45 LA – WARD 19 yd pass from CUMBIE (FORD rush) – 56–38 GR
- 06:28 GR – MCPHERSON 2 yd run (GOWINS kick) – 63–38 GR
- 00:44 GR – HIGGINS 19 yd pass from MACPHERSON (GOWINS kick) 70–38 GR

4th Quarter:

- 14:23 GR – JOHNSON 1 yd fumble recovery (GOWINS kick) – 77–38 GR
- 10:02 LA – TOLVER 16 yd pass from T. HICKS (DAVIS kick) – 77–45 GR
- 09:16 GR – MARTIN 57 yd kickoff return (GOWINS kick) – 84–45 GR
- 04:28 LA – INGRAM 14 yd pass from T. HICKS (DAVIS kick) – 84–52 GR
- 00:21 LA – INGRAM 8 yd pass from T. HICKS (DAVIS kick) – 84–59 GR
- Officials: Referee: Dennis Lipski; Umpire: Paul Frerking; Linesman: Brent Durbin; Line judge: Darrel Leftwich; Back judge: Reggie Smith
- Offensive Player of the Game: Chris Martin (GR)
- Defensive Player of the Game: James Macpherson (GR)
- Ironman Player of the Game: Ahmad Hawkins (GR)

=== Week 6: at New York Dragons ===
Quarter	1	2	3	4	Total
GR	0	0	21	13	34
NY	21	14	21	7	63

at Nassau Veterans Memorial Coliseum, Uniondale, New York

- Date: April 5
- Game time: 7:00 PM EST
- Game attendance: 8,211

Game information

1st Quarter:

- 11:22 NY – Chris Anthony 19 yd pass from Aaron Garcia (Chris Onorato kick) – 7–0 NY
- 04:37 NY – Keron Henry 33 yd pass from Aaron Garcia (Chris Onorato kick) – 14–0 NY
- 01:49 NY – Jason Willis 16 yd pass from Aaron Garcia (Chris Onorato kick) – 21–0 NY

2nd Quarter:

- 11:09 NY – Terry Moss 16 yd pass from Aaron Garcia (Chris Onorato kick) – 28–0 NY
- 03:15 NY – Aaron Garcia 2 yd run (Chris Onorato kick) – 35–0 NY

3rd Quarter:

- 13:49 NY – Chris Anthony 27 yd pass from Aaron Garcia (Chris Onorato kick) – 42–0 NY
- 11:29 NY – John Walker 15 yd interception return (Chris Onorato kick) – 49–0 NY
- 08:16 GR – Jermaine Lewis 4 yd pass from James MacPherson (Brian Gowins kick) – 49–7 NY
- 07:47 GR – William Haith 1 yd fumble recovery (Brian Gowins kick) – 49–14 NY
- 03:43 GR – Fitu Tu'ua 19 yd pass from James MacPherson (Brian Gowins kick) – 49–21 NY
- 00:34 NY – Chris Anthony 6 yd pass from Aaron Garcia (Chris Onorato kick) – 56–21 NY

4th Quarter:

- 07:03 GR – Ahmad Hawkins 42 yd interception return (Brian Gowins kick) – 56–28 NY
- 04:53 NY – Chris Anthony 2 yd pass from Aaron Garcia (Chris Onorato kick) – 63–28 NY
- 02:59 GR – Kenny Higgins 27 yd pass from James MacPherson (Brian Gowins kick failed) – 63–34 NY
- Officials: Referee: Bill Athan; Umpire: Matt Jordan; Linesman: Allan Baynes; Line judge: Rusty Baynes; Back judge: Greg Wilson
- Offensive Player of the Game: Aaron Garcia (NY)
- Defensive Player of the Game: John Walker (NY)
- Ironman Player of the Game: Chris Anthony (NY)

=== Week 7: vs. Orlando Predators ===
Quarter	1	2	3	4	Total
ORL	13	34	28	0	75
GR	7	14	14	21	56

at Van Andel Arena, Grand Rapids, Michigan

- Date: April 13
- Game time: 2:00 PM EST
- Game attendance: 6,946

Game information

1st Quarter:

- 13:28 GR – Anthony Hines 15 yd pass from James MacPherson (Brian Gowins kick) – 7–0 GR
- 10:42 ORL – T.T. Toliver 30 yd pass from Shane Stafford (John Vaughn kick) – 7–7
- 00:00 ORL – Marlon Moye-Moore 3 yd run (John Vaughn kick failed) – 13–7 ORL

2nd Quarter:

- 13:43 GR – Kenny Higgins 8 yd pass from James MacPherson (Brian Gowins kick) – 14–13 GR
- 11:06 ORL – Odie Armstrong 39 yd pass from Shane Stafford (John Vaughn kick) – 20–14 ORL
- 09:52 ORL – Ron Johnson 4 yd interception return (John Vaughn kick) – 27–14 ORL
- 05:35 ORL – Marlon Moye-Moore 3 yd run (John Vaughn kick) – 34–14 ORL
- 03:44 ORL – B.J. Cohen 0 yd fumble recovery (John Vaughn kick) – 41–14 ORL
- 01:23 GR – Kenny Higgins 12 yd pass from James MacPherson (Brian Gowins kick) – 41–21 ORL
- 00:10 ORL – T.T. Toliver 10 yd pass from Shane Stafford (John Vaughn kick failed) – 47–21 ORL

3rd Quarter:

- 11:33 ORL – Chas Gessner 4 yd pass from Shane Stafford (John Vaughn kick) – 54–21 ORL
- 10:19 ORL – Ahmad Carroll 4 yd net recovery (John Vaughn kick) – 61–21 ORL
- 07:25 GR – Anthony Hines 20 yd pass from James MacPherson (Brian Gowins kick) – 61–28 ORL
- 04:58 ORL – T.T. Toliver 28 yd run (John Vaughn kick) – 68–28 ORL
- 04:02 GR – Chris Martin 56 yd kickoff return (Brian Gowins kick) – 68–35 ORL
- 01:13 ORL – T.T. Toliver 43 yd pass from Jake Eaton (John Vaughn kick) – 75–35 ORL

4th Quarter:

- 10:21 GR – Kenny Higgins 1 yd run (Brian Gowins kick) – 75–42 ORL
- 08:58 GR – Jermaine Lewis 4 yd pass from James MacPherson (Brian Gowins kick) – 75–49 ORL
- 01:28 GR – Kenny Higgins 36 yd pass from James MacPherson (Brian Gowins kick) – 75–56 ORL
- Officials: Referee: Bill McCabe; Umpire: Mike Delaney; Linesman: Shawn Hochuli; Line judge: Derk Bell; Back judge: Jimmy Buchanan
- Offensive Player of the Game: T.T. Toliver (ORL)
- Defensive Player of the Game: Rob Schroeder (ORL)
- Ironman Player of the Game: Marlon Moye-Moore (ORL)

=== Week 8: at Chicago Rush ===
Quarter	1	2	3	4	Total
GR	7	17	7	21	52
CHI	13	14	13	15	55

at Allstate Arena, Rosemont, Illinois

- Date: April 20
- Game time: 3:00 PM EST
- Game attendance: 16,112

Game information

1st Quarter:

- 14:22 CHI – Donovan Morgan 26 yd pass from Russ Michna (Dan Frantz kick) – 7–0 CHI
- 09:12 GR – James MacPherson 1 yd run (Brian Gowins kick) – 7–7
- 03:29 CHI – DeJuan Alfonzo 1 yd run (Dan Frantz kick failed) – 13–7 CHI

2nd Quarter:

- 14:24 GR – Jermaine Lewis 16 yd pass from James MacPherson (Brian Gowins kick) – 14–13 GR
- 11:24 CHI – Dan Alexander 3 yd run (Dan Frantz kick) – 20–14 CHI
- 04:30 GR – Brian Gowins 21 yd field goal – 20–17 CHI
- 01:18 GR – Anthony Hines 3 yd pass from James MacPherson (Brian Gowins kick) – 24–20 GR
- 00:05 CHI – Donovan Morgan 6 yd pass from Russ Michna (Dan Frantz kick) – 27–24 CHI

3rd Quarter:

- 08:28 CHI – Russ Michna 1 yd run (Dan Frantz kick) – 34–24 CHI
- 05:33 GR – Kenny Higgins 26 yd pass from James MacPherson (Brian Gowins kick) – 34–31 CHI
- 03:05 CHI – Donovan Morgan 26 yd pass from Russ Michna (Dan Frantz kick blocked) – 40–31 CHI

4th Quarter:

- 12:55 GR – Kenny Higgins 26 yd pass from James MacPherson (Brian Gowins kick) – 40–38 CHI
- 11:42 GR – Jermaine Lewis 3 yd pass from James MacPherson (Brian Gowins kick) – 45–40 GR
- 08:57 CHI – Donovan Morgan 17 yd pass from Russ Michna (Travis LaTendresse pass from MICHNA) – 48–45 CHI
- 05:35 GR – Kenny Higgins 8 yd pass from James MacPherson (Brian Gowins kick) – 52–48 GR
- 01:32 CHI – Damian Harrell 14 yd pass from Russ Michna (Dan Frantz kick) – 55–52 CHI
- Officials: Referee: Pat Garvey; Umpire: Paul Frerking; Linesman: Bill Ward; Line judge: Bob McElwee; Back judge: James DeBell
- Offensive Player of the Game: Donovan Morgan (CHI)
- Defensive Player of the Game: DeJuan Alfonzo (CHI)
- Ironman Player of the Game: N/A

=== Week 9: vs. Kansas City Brigade ===
Quarter	1	2	3	4	Total
KC	7	10	14	7	38
GR	20	21	14	17	72

at Van Andel Arena, Grand Rapids, Michigan

- Date: April 25
- Game time: 7:00 PM EST
- Game attendance: 8,102

Game information

1st Quarter:

- 14:04 GR – HIGGINS 1 yd run (GOWINS kick failed) – 6–0 GR
- 06:42 GR – JOHNSON 16 yd run (GOWINS kick) – 13–0 GR
- 03:30 KC – MOSS 4 yd run (MARTINEZ kick) – 13–7 GR
- 02:10 GR – JOHNSON 40 yd pass from MACPHERSON (GOWINS kick) – 20–7 GR

2nd Quarter:

- 09:14 KC – MARTINEZ 18 yd field goal – 20–10 GR
- 03:20 GR – HIGGINS 2 yd pass from MACPHERSON (GOWINS kick) – 27–10 GR
- 02:06 KC – BRYANT 20 yd run (MARTINEZ kick) – 27–17 GR
- 00:54 GR – MAGNER 11 yd pass from MACPHERSON (GOWINS kick) – 34–17 GR
- 00:15 GR – STEITZ 17 yd pass from MACPHERSON (GOWINS kick) – 41–17 GR

3rd Quarter:

- 12:43 GR – MAGNER 9 yd pass from MACPHERSON (GOWINS kick) – 48–17 GR
- 10:29 KC – HORACEK 19 yd pass from BRYANT (MARTINEZ kick) – 48–24 GR
- 04:06 GR – MAGNER 13 yd pass from MACPHERSON (GOWINS kick) – 55–24 GR
- 02:14 KC – MYERS 38 yd pass from BRYANT (MARTINEZ kick) – 55–31 GR

4th Quarter:

- 12:48 GR – GOWINS 19 yd field goal – 58–31 GR
- 06:59 GR – MACPHERSON 1 yd run (GOWINS kick) – 65–31 GR
- 00:47 GR – FITZGERALD 20 yd run (GOWINS kick) – 72–31 GR
- 00:30 KC – MANNING 33 yd pass from BRYANT (MARTINEZ kick) – 72–38 GR
- Officials: Referee: Tom McCabe; Umpire: Rick Podraza; Linesman: Rod Pearson; Line judge: Dana McKenzie; Back judge: Tony Lombardo
- Offensive Player of the Game: Cole Magner (GR)
- Defensive Player of the Game: Michael McFadden (GR)
- Ironman Player of the Game: Chris Martin (GR)

=== Week 10: at Colorado Crush ===
Quarter	1	2	3	4	Total
GR	7	14	7	0	28
COL	14	28	14	7	63

at Pepsi Center, Denver, Colorado

- Date: May 2
- Game time: 9:00 PM EST
- Game attendance: 14,527

Game information

1st Quarter:

- 10:40 COL – PYATT 4 yd pass from DUTTON (YAUSSI kick) – 7–0 COL
- 08:06 GR – HIGGINS 24 yd pass from MACPHERSON (GOWINS kick) – 7–7
- 03:04 COL – WATTON 1 yd run (YAUSSI kick) – 14–7 COL

2nd Quarter:

- 13:39 GR – JOHNSON 13 yd pass from MACPHERSON (GOWINS kick) – 14–14
- 07:51 COL – HOSACK 9 yd pass from DUTTON (YAUSSI kick) – 21–14 COL
- 02:59 COL – HOSACK 9 yd pass from DUTTON (YAUSSI kick) – 28–14 COL
- 00:37 GR – BROWDEN 6 yd run (GOWINS kick) – 28–21 COL
- 00:13 COL – OWENS 4 yd run (YAUSSI kick) – 35–21 COL
- 00:02 COL – SAPE 3 yd fumble recovery (YAUSSI kick) – 42–21 COL

3rd Quarter:

- 06:32 COL – HOSACK 8 yd pass from DUTTON (YAUSSI kick) – 49–21 COL
- 04:12 COL – ROGERS 0 yd fumble recovery (YAUSSI kick) – 56–21 COL
- 01:56 GR – HIGGINS 14 yd pass from MACPHERSON (GOWINS kick) – 56–28 COL

4th Quarter:

- 14:57 COL – HOSACK 11 yd pass from DUTTON (YAUSSI kick) – 63–28 COL
- Officials: Referee: Riley Johnson; Umpire: Wes Fritz; Linesman: Neil Brunner; Line judge: Paul Engelberts; Back judge: Tony Lombardo
- Offensive Player of the Game: N/A
- Defensive Player of the Game: N/A
- Ironman Player of the Game: N/A

=== Week 11: at Dallas Desperados ===
Quarter	1	2	3	4	Total
GR	13	17	14	10	54
DAL	16	21	14	14	65

at American Airlines Center, Dallas, Texas

- Date: May 10
- Game time: 8:00 PM EST
- Game attendance: 11,476

Game information

1st Quarter:

- 14:28 GR – HIGGINS, Kenny 45 yd pass from MACPHERSON, James (GOWINS, Brian kick failed) – 6–0 GR
- 12:11 DAL – WHITE, Josh 17 yd pass from DOLEZEL, Clint (HAMILTON, Remy kick) – 7–6 DAL
- 10:07 DAL – STEWART, Dalero safety – 9–6 DAL
- 04:20 DAL – DIXON, David 3 yd run (HAMILTON, Remy kick) – 16–6 DAL
- 00:34 GR – JOHNSON, Chris 16 yd pass from MACPHERSON, James (GOWINS, Brian kick) – 16–13 DAL

2nd Quarter:

- 12:31 DAL – NASH, Marcus 7 yd pass from DOLEZEL, Clint (HAMILTON, Remy kick) – 23–13 DAL
- 09:26 GR – GOWINS, Brian 50 yd field goal – 23–16 DAL
- 06:07 DAL – NASH, Marcus 8 yd pass from DOLEZEL, Clint (HAMILTON, Remy kick) – 30–16 DAL
- 01:49 GR – HIGGINS, Kenny 25 yd pass from MACPHERSON, James (GOWINS, Brian kick) – 30–23 DAL
- 00:30 DAL – NASH, Marcus 25 yd pass from DOLEZEL, Clint (HAMILTON, Remy kick) – 37–23 DAL
- 00:02 GR – LEWIS, Jermaine 8 yd pass from MACPHERSON, James (GOWINS, Brian kick) – 37–30 DAL

3rd Quarter:

- 13:48 DAL – NASH, Marcus 15 yd pass from DOLEZEL, Clint (HAMILTON, Remy kick) – 44–30 DAL
- 10:06 GR – LEWIS, Jermaine 17 yd pass from MACPHERSON, James (GOWINS, Brian kick) – 44–37 DAL
- 03:21 GR – JOHNSON, Chris 16 yd pass from MACPHERSON, James (GOWINS, Brian kick) – 44–44
- 02:13 DAL – NASH, Marcus 45 yd pass from DOLEZEL, Clint (HAMILTON, Remy kick) – 51–44 DAL

4th Quarter:

- 13:53 GR – HIGGINS, Kenny 5 yd pass from MACPHERSON, James (GOWINS, Brian kick) – 51–51
- 11:00 DAL – NASH, Marcus 6 yd pass from DOLEZEL, Clint (HAMILTON, Remy kick) – 58–51 DAL
- 06:26 GR – GOWINS, Brian 24 yd field goal – 58–54 DAL
- 05:07 DAL – CALAHAN, Jeremy 3 yd pass from DOLEZEL, Clint (HAMILTON, Remy kick) – 65–54 DAL
- Officials: Referee: Bill Athan; Umpire: Matt Jordan; Linesman: Allen Baynes; Line judge: Rusty Baynes; Back judge: Greg Wilson
- Offensive Player of the Game: Clint Dolezel (DAL)
- Defensive Player of the Game: Daleroy Stewart (DAL)
- Ironman Player of the Game: Will Pettis (DAL)

=== Week 12: vs. Tampa Bay Storm ===
Quarter	1	2	3	4	Total
TB	7	28	20	3	58
GR	21	7	14	8	50

at Van Andel Arena, Grand Rapids, Michigan

- Date: May 16
- Game time: 7:00 PM EST
- Game attendance: 7,205

Game information

1st Quarter:

- 10:30 GR – JOHNSON 10 yd pass from MACPHERSON (GOWINS kick) – 7–0 GR
- 07:08 TB – MARSHALL 1 yd run (MARLER kick) – 7–7
- 05:12 GR – MAGNER 10 yd pass from MACPHERSON (GOWINS kick) – 14–7 GR
- 01:22 GR – JOHNSON 6 yd pass from MACPHERSON (GOWINS kick) – 21–7 GR

2nd Quarter:

- 12:05 TB – EDWARDS 13 yd pass from DIETZ (MARLER kick) – 21–14 GR
- 09:53 TB – SHAW 30 yd pass from DIETZ (MARLER kick) – 21–21
- 08:11 TB – RACHAL 3 yd net recovery (MARLER kick) – 28–21 TB
- 04:09 GR – JOHNSON 10 yd pass from MACPHERSON (GOWINS kick) – 28–28
- 00:16 TB – EDWARDS 3 yd pass from DIETZ (MARLER kick) – 35–28 TB

3rd Quarter:

- 14:02 TB – SAMUELS 11 yd pass from DIETZ (MARLER kick) – 42–28 TB
- 11:56 GR – MAGNER 23 yd pass from MACPHERSON (GOWINS kick) – 42–35 TB
- 09:04 TB – MARSHALL 3 yd run (MARLER kick failed) – 48–35 TB
- 06:03 GR – HIGGINS 14 yd pass from MACPHERSON (GOWINS kick) – 48–42 TB
- 04:17 TB – ROBINSON 34 yd pass from DIETZ (MARLER kick) – 55–42 TB

4th Quarter:

- 01:46 TB – MARLER 18 yd field goal – 58–42 TB
- 00:20 GR – BROWDEN 3 yd run (HIGGINS pass from MACPHERSON) – 58–50 TB
- Officials: Referee: Dave Cutaia; Umpire: Al Granado; Linesman: Shawn Hochuli; Line judge: Paul Engelberts; Back judge: James Cole
- Offensive Player of the Game: Cole Magner (GR)
- Defensive Player of the Game: Traco Rachal (TB)
- Ironman Player of the Game: Lawrence Samuels (TB)

=== Week 13: at Arizona Rattlers ===
Quarter	1	2	3	4	Total
GR	7	21	14	6	48
ARZ	14	21	0	17	52

at US Airways Center, Phoenix, Arizona

- Date: May 24
- Game time: 10:00 PM EST
- Game attendance: 12,559

Game information

1st Quarter:

- 09:09 ARZ – ROBINSON 1 yd run (HOULE kick) – 7–0 ARZ
- 07:52 GR – JOHNSON 25 yd pass from MACPHERSON (GOWINS kick) – 7–7
- 01:41 ARZ – ROBINSON 2 yd run (HOULE kick) – 14–7 ARZ

2nd Quarter:

- 14:55 GR – HIGGINS 17 yd pass from MACPHERSON (GOWINS kick) – 14–14
- 10:05 ARZ – HARVEY 1 yd run (HOULE kick) – 21–14 ARZ
- 05:17 GR – JOHNSON 31 yd pass from MACPHERSON (GOWINS kick) – 21–21
- 00:47 ARZ – ROBINSON 1 yd run (HOULE kick) – 28–21 ARZ
- 00:28 GR – JOHNSON 45 yd pass from MACPHERSON (GOWINS kick) 28–28
- 00:00 ARZ – BURLEY 11 yd pass from SMOKER (HOULE kick) – 35–28 ARZ

3rd Quarter:

- 10:52 GR – JOHNSON 20 yd pass from MACPHERSON (GOWINS kick) – 35–35
- 03:52 GR – HIGGINS 1 yd run (GOWINS kick) – 42–35 GR

4th Quarter:

- 13:28 ARZ – HARVEY 29 yd pass from SMOKER (HOULE kick) – 42–42
- 07:11 ARZ – HOULE 25 yd field goal – 45–42 ARZ
- 06:07 GR – SEWELL 34 yd pass from MACPHERSON (GOWINS kick failed) – 48–45 GR
- 00:35 ARZ – SMOKER 1 yd run (HOULE kick) – 52–48 ARZ
- Officials: Referee: LEMONNIER, Bill; Umpire: CARR, Jeff; Linesman: SHIELDS, Greg; Line judge: CHESNEY, Dave; Back judge: BECKETT, Billy
- Offensive Player of the Game: Jeff Smoker (ARZ)
- Defensive Player of the Game: Chris Mckenzie (ARZ)
- Ironman Player of the Game: Marvin Brown (ARZ)

=== Week 14: vs. Utah Blaze ===
Quarter	1	2	3	4	Total
UTA	21	21	14	7	63
GR	7	7	21	21	56

at Van Andel Arena, Grand Rapids, Michigan

- Date: June 1
- Game time: 2:00 PM EST
- Game attendance: 5,252

Game information

1st Quarter:

- 13:25 UTA – WHITTAKER 42 yd pass from GERMAINE (VIDETICH kick) – 7–0 UTA
- 07:46 GR – HIGGINS 27 yd pass from MACPHERSON (GOWINS kick) – 7–7
- 05:56 UTA – MCKELVEY 49 yd pass from GERMAINE (VIDETICH kick) – 14–7 UTA
- 03:21 UTA – MORRIS 4 yd fumble recovery (VIDETICH kick) – 21–7 UTA

2nd Quarter:

- 10:53 UTA – FILER 6 yd run (VIDETICH kick) – 28–7 UTA
- 07:49 UTA – FILER 1 yd run (VIDETICH kick) – 35–7 UTA
- 05:03 GR – MAGNER 4 yd pass from MACPHERSON (GOWINS kick) – 35–14 UTA
- 00:02 UTA – WHITTAKER 3 yd pass from GERMAINE (VIDETICH kick) – 42–14 UTA

3rd Quarter:

- 12:50 GR – HIGGINS 26 yd pass from MACPHERSON (GOWINS kick) – 42–21 UTA
- 12:02 UTA – JONES 56 yd kickoff return (VIDETICH kick) – 49–21 UTA
- 08:53 GR – HIGGINS 2 yd run (GOWINS kick) – 49–28 UTA
- 03:43 UTA – WHITTAKER 2 yd run (VIDETICH kick) – 56–28 UTA
- 01:28 GR – MAGNER 29 yd pass from MACPHERSON (GOWINS kick) – 56–35 UTA

4th Quarter:

- 11:05 GR – HIGGINS 1 yd run (GOWINS kick) – 56–42 UTA
- 04:25 GR – MACPHERSON 3 yd run (GOWINS kick) – 56–49 UTA
- 02:05 UTA – MCKELVEY 15 yd pass from GERMAINE (VIDETICH kick) – 63–49 UTA
- 00:26 GR – MACPHERSON 15 yd run (GOWINS kick) – 63–56 UTA
- Officials: Referee: Riley Johnson; Umpire: Tom Laverty; Linesman: Allen Baynes; Line judge: David Meslow; Back judge: Keith Washington
- Offensive Player of the Game: JJ McKelvey (UTA)
- Defensive Player of the Game: Kelvin Morris (UTA)
- Ironman Player of the Game: J'Sharlon Jones (UTAH)

=== Week 15: vs. Colorado Crush ===
Quarter	1	2	3	4	Total
COL	10	14	19	22	65
GR	7	37	23	17	84

at Van Andel Arena, Grand Rapids, Michigan

- Date: June 7
- Game time: 7:00 PM EST
- Game attendance: 7,766

Game information

1st Quarter:

- 13:05 GR – Chris Johnson 22 yd pass from James MacPherson (Brian Gowins kick) – 7–0 GR
- 08:30 COL – Deric Yaussi 22 yd field goal – 7–3 GR
- 04:17 COL – Willie Quinnie 24 yd pass from John Dutton (Deric Yaussi kick) – 10–7 COL

2nd Quarter:

- 14:56 GR – Cole Magner 11 yd pass from James MacPherson (Brian Gowins kick) – 14–10 GR
- 13:20 COL – Willie Quinnie 15 yd pass from John Dutton (Deric Yaussi kick) – 17–14 COL
- 11:04 GR – Chris Johnson 28 yd pass from James MacPherson (Brian Gowins kick) – 21–17 GR
- 09:54 GR – Donovan Arp safety – 23–17 GR
- 05:57 GR – James MacPherson 1 yd run (Brian Gowins kick) – 30–17 GR
- 03:30 COL – Willie Quinnie 8 yd pass from John Dutton (Deric Yaussi kick) – 30–24 GR
- 00:44 GR – Donovan Arp 4 yd pass from James MacPherson (Brian Gowins kick) – 37–24 GR
- 00:06 GR – Chris Johnson 7 yd pass from James MacPherson (Brian Gowins kick) – 44–24 GR

3rd Quarter:

- 13:17 COL – John Dutton 3 yd run (Deric Yaussi kick failed) – 44–30 GR
- 11:24 GR – Kenny Higgins 32 yd pass from James MacPherson (Brian Gowins kick) – 51–30 GR
- 07:55 COL – Ben Nelson 13 yd pass from John Dutton (Deric Yaussi kick) – 51–37 GR
- 07:02 GR – Kenny Higgins 10 yd pass from James MacPherson (Brian Gowins kick) – 58–37 GR
- 05:52 COL – Chad Owens 20 yd pass from John Dutton (Deric Yaussi kick failed) – 58–43 GR
- 03:58 GR – Cole Magner 5 yd pass from James MacPherson (Brian Gowins kick failed) – 64–43 GR
- 00:26 GR – Brian Gowins 39 yd field goal – 67–43 GR

4th Quarter:

- 14:52 COL – Ben Nelson 21 yd pass from John Dutton (Willie Quinnie pass from DUTTON) – 67–51 GR
- 11:08 COL – Ben Nelson 6 yd pass from John Dutton (Ben Nelson pass from YAUSSI) – 67–59 GR
- 08:41 GR – Kenny Higgins 20 yd pass from James MacPherson (Brian Gowins kick) – 74–59 GR
- 01:31 GR – Brian Gowins 39 yd field goal – 77–59 GR
- 00:54 COL – Willie Quinnie 28 yd pass from John Dutton (Deric Yaussi pass failed) – 77–65 GR
- 00:37 GR – Cole Magner 7 yd pass from James MacPherson (Brian Gowins kick) – 84–65 GR
- Officials: Referee: Dave Lambros; Umpire: Doug Wilson; Linesman: Kelly Saalfeld; Line judge: Brian Matthew; Back judge: Rich Wilborn
- Offensive Player of the Game: James MacPherson (GR)
- Defensive Player of the Game: Jermaine Lewis (GR)
- Ironman Player of the Game: Donovan Arp (GR)

=== Week 16: at Columbus Destroyers ===
Quarter	1	2	3	4	Total
GR	14	21	21	7	63
CLB	10	28	7	15	60

at Nationwide Arena, Columbus, Ohio

- Date: June 14
- Game time: 7:00 PM EST
- Game attendance: N/A

Game information

1st Quarter:

- 10:22 CLB – Mark Lewis 18 Yd field goal – 3–0 CLB
- 06:42 GR – Terrell Browden 5 Yd Run (Brian Gowins Kick) – 7–3 GR
- 04:24 CLB – Derek Lee 27 Yd Pass From Matt Nagy (Mark Lewis Kick) – 10–7 CLB
- 02:33 GR – Chris Johnson 22 Yd Pass From James Macpherson (Brian Gowins Kick) – 14–10 GR

2nd Quarter:

- 12:00 CLB – C.J. Johnson 15 Yd Pass From Matt Nagy (Mark Lewis Kick) – 17–14 CLB
- 11:14 GR – Chris Martin 57 Yd Kickoff Return (Brian Gowins Kick) – 21–17 GR
- 10:12 CLB – C.J. Johnson 47 Yd Pass From Justin Zwick (Mark Lewis Kick) – 24–21 CLB
- 06:53 GR – T.J. Watkins 4 Yd Run (Brian Gowins Kick) – 28–24 GR
- 04:53 CLB – Harold Wells 1 Yd Run (Mark Lewis Kick) – 31–28 CLB
- 03:10 GR – Kenny Higgins 36 Yd Pass From James Macpherson (Brian Gowins Kick) – 35–31 GR
- 00:40 CLB – C.J. Johnson 12 Yd Pass From Matt Nagy (Mark Lewis Kick) – 38–35 CLB

3rd Quarter:

- 14:41 GR – Chris Martin 57 Yd Kickoff Return (Brian Gowins Kick) 42–38 GR
- 12:48 CLB – Derek Lee 45 Yd Pass From Matt Nagy (Mark Lewis Kick) – 45–42 CLB
- 09:30 GR – Cole Magner 12 Yd Pass From James Macpherson (Brian Gowins Kick) – 49–45 GR
- 01:49 GR – Cole Magner 27 Yd Pass From James Macpherson (Brian Gowins Kick) – 56–45 GR

4th Quarter:

- 14:14 CLB – Calvin Russell 6 Yd Pass From Matt Nagy (Mark Lewis Kick) – 56–52 GR
- 06:53 GR – Chris Johnson 6 Yd Pass From James Macpherson (Brian Gowins Kick) – 63–52 GR
- 03:47 CLB – C.J. Johnson 22 Yd Pass From Matt Nagy (Rasheed Marshall Run) – 63–60 GR
- Officials: N/A
- Offensive Player of the Game: N/A
- Defensive Player of the Game: N/A
- Ironman Player of the Game: N/A

=== Week 17: at New Orleans VooDoo ===
Quarter	1	2	3	4	Total
GR	21	27	10	28	86
NO	14	21	14	21	70

at New Orleans Arena, New Orleans, Louisiana

- Date: June 21
- Game time: 7:00 PM EST
- Game attendance: 17,006

Game information

1st Quarter:

- 11:50 GR – McPherson, J. 1 yd run (Gowins, B. kick) – 7–0 GR
- 08:16 NO – Wimprine, D. 1 yd run (Ruffin, J. kick) – 7–7
- 05:26 GR – Johnson, c. 19 yd pass from McPherson, J. (Gowins, B. kick) – 14–7 GR
- 04:19 NO – Pope, J. 45 yd pass from Wimprine, D. (Ruffin, J. kick) – 14–14
- 00:30 GR – Higgins, K. 24 yd pass from McPherson, J. (Gowins, B. kick) – 21–14

2nd Quarter:

- 14:31 NO – Dudley, J. 36 yd pass from Wimprine, D. (Ruffin, J. kick) – 21–21
- 12:50 GR – Johnson, c. 8 yd pass from McPherson, J. (Gowins, B. kick) – 28–21 GR
- 11:46 GR – Magner, C. 1 yd run (Gowins, B. kick) – 35–21 GR
- 09:14 GR – McPherson, J. 4 yd run (Gowins, B. kick) – 42–21 GR
- 05:10 NO – Dudley, J. 30 yd pass from Wimprine, D. (Ruffin, J. kick) – 42–28 GR
- 02:12 GR – Gowins, B. 24 yd field goal – 45–28 GR
- 00:36 NO – Ross, I. 17 yd pass from Wimprine, D. (Ruffin, J. kick) – 45–35 GR
- 00:00 GR – Gowins, B. 18 yd field goal – 48–35 GR

3rd Quarter:

- 10:37 GR – Gowins, B. 20 yd field goal – 51–35 GR
- 06:29 NO – Jordan, J. 5 yd pass from Wimprine, D. (Ruffin, J. kick) – 51–42 GR
- 04:11 GR – Lewis, J. 31 yd pass from McPherson, J. (Gowins, B. kick) – 58–42 GR
- 00:45 NO – Pope, J. 6 yd pass from Wimprine, D. (Ruffin, J. kick) – 58–49 GR

4th Quarter:

- 14:57 GR – Higgins, K. 3 yd pass from McPherson, J. (Gowins, B. kick) – 65–49
- 09:48 NO – Jordan, J. 16 yd pass from Wimprine, D. (Ruffin, J. kick failed) – 65–55 GR
- 07:30 GR – Lewis, J. 4 yd pass from McPherson, J. (Gowins, B. kick) – 72–55 GR
- 02:14 GR – Higgins, K. 29 yd pass from McPherson, J. (Gowins, B. kick) – 79–55 GR
- 01:14 NO – Pope, J. 54 yd kickoff return (Bellisari, S. rush) – 79–63 GR
- 00:11 GR – McPherson, J. 4 yd run (Gowins, B. kick) – 86–63 GR
- 00:00 NO – Jordan, J. 26 yd pass from Wimprine, D. (Ruffin, J. kick) – 86–70 GR
- Officials: Referee: Dennis Lipski; Umpire: Rick Nelson; Linesman: Julian Mapp; Line judge: R.G. Detillier; Back judge: Bud McClesky
- Offensive Player of the Game: James MacPherson (GR)
- Defensive Player of the Game: William Haith (GR)
- Ironman Player of the Game: Jermaine Lewis (GR)

== Playoffs ==
=== American Conference Wild Card: at (3) Arizona Rattlers ===
Quarter	1	2	3	4	Total
(6) GR	10	17	14	7	48
(3) ARZ	0	20	14	7	41

at US Airways Arena, Phoenix, Arizona

- Date: June 30
- Game time: 9:30 PM EST
- Game attendance: 10,862

Game information

1st Quarter:

- 09:04 GR – WATKINS 4 yd pass from MACPHERSON (GOWINS kick) – 7–0 GR
- 01:15 GR – GOWINS 22 yd field goal – 10–0 GR

2nd Quarter:

- 13:47 ARZ – BURLEY 13 yd pass from SMOKER (HOULE kick failed) – 10–6 GR
- 11:52 GR – HIGGINS 44 yd pass from MACPHERSON (GOWINS kick) – 17–6 GR
- 09:45 ARZ – HARVEY 10 yd pass from SMOKER (HOULE kick) – 17–13 GR
- 05:32 GR – MAGNER 13 yd pass from MACPHERSON (GOWINS kick) – 24–13 GR
- 04:35 ARZ – HARVEY 56 yd kickoff return (HOULE kick) – 24–20 GR
- 00:00 GR – GOWINS 19 yd field goal – 27–20 GR

3rd Quarter:

- 12:15 ARZ – BURLEY 11 yd pass from SMOKER (HOULE kick) – 27–27
- 06:38 GR – MAGNER 5 yd pass from MACPHERSON (GOWINS kick) – 34–27 GR
- 04:39 ARZ – HARVEY 36 yd pass from SMOKER (HOULE kick) – 34–34
- 01:27 GR – MACPHERSON 1 yd run (GOWINS kick) – 41–34 GR

4th Quarter:

- 09:45 ARZ – SMOKER 1 yd run (HOULE kick) – 41–41
- 06:26 GR – HIGGINS 28 yd pass from MACPHERSON (GOWINS kick) – 48–41 GR
- Officials: Referee: MCCABE, Tom; Umpire: FRITZ, Wes; Linesman: SHIELDS, Greg; Line judge: BAYNES, Rusty; Back judge: BECKETT, Billy
- Offensive Player of the Game: Kenny Higgins (GR)
- Defensive Player of the Game: William Haith (GR)
- Ironman Player of the Game: Trandon Harvey (ARZ)

=== American Conference Divisional: at (1) Chicago Rush ===
Quarter	1	2	3	4	Total
(6) GR	14	17	7	20	58
(1) CHI	7	14	14	6	41

at Allstate Arena, Rosemont, Illinois

- Date: July 6
- Game time: 3:00 PM EST
- Game attendance: TBA

Game information

1st Quarter:

- 13:55 CHI – Travis Latendresse 33 Yd Pass From Russ Michna (Todd France Kick) – 7–0 CHI
- 10:48 GR – Jason Shelley 24 Yd Pass From James Macpherson (Brian Gowins Kick) – 7–7
- 04:04 GR – Cole Magner 4 Yd Pass From James Macpherson (Brian Gowins Kick) – 14–7 GR

2nd Quarter:

- 12:52 CHI – Donovan Morgan 2 Yd Pass From Russ Michna (Todd France Kick) – 14–14
- 09:44 GR – Kenny Higgins 24 Yd Pass From James Macpherson (Brian Gowins Kick) – 21–14 GR
- 07:47 CHI – Travis Latendresse 27 Yd Pass From Russ Michna (Todd France Kick) – 21–21
- 03:10 GR – Kenny Higgins 11 Yd Pass From James Macpherson (Brian Gowins Kick) – 28–21 GR
- 00:00 GR – Brian Gowins 25 Yd Field Goal – 31–21 GR

3rd Quarter:

- 10:03 CHI – Travis Latendresse 19 Yd Pass From Russ Michna (Todd France Kick) – 31–28 GR
- 05:59 GR – Kenny Higgins 3 Yd Pass From James Macpherson (Brian Gowins Kick) – 38–28 GR
- 03:17 CHI – Dan Alexander 2 Yd Run (Todd France Kick) – 38–35 GR

4th Quarter:

- 13:00 GR – James Macpherson 1 Yd Run (Brian Gowins Kick) – 45–35 GR
- 04:49 GR – Terrell Browden 1 Yd Run (Brian Gowins Kick Failed) – 51–35 GR
- 03:17 CHI – Donovan Morgan 17 Yd Pass From Russ Michna (Two-Point Conversion Failed) – 51–41 GR
- 01:27 GR – Cole Magner 3 Yd Pass From James Macpherson (Brian Gowins Kick) – 58–41 GR
- Officials: TBA
- Offensive Player of the Game: James MacPherson (GR)
- Defensive Player of the Game: William Haith (GR)
- Ironman Player of the Game: N/A

=== American Conference Championship: vs. (2) San Jose SaberCats ===
Quarter	1	2	3	4	Total
(6) GR	7	7	14	27	55
(2) SJ	14	24	10	33	81

at HP Pavilion at San Jose, San Jose, California

- Date: July 12
- Game time: 3:30 PM EST
- Game attendance: 14,072

Game information

1st Quarter:

- 12:22 GR – SHELLEY, Jason 15 yd pass from MACPHERSON, Jam (GOWINS, Brian kick) – 7–0 GR
- 08:55 SJ – SAINTIL, Cleann 7 yd pass from GRIEB, Mark (HAGLUND, A.J. kick) – 7–7
- 02:27 SJ – GEATHERS, Jason 14 yd pass from GRIEB, Mark (HAGLUND, A.J. kick) – 14–7 SJ

2nd Quarter:

- 12:18 SJ – FREDERIC, Gene 3 yd pass from GRIEB, Mark (HAGLUND, A.J. kick) – 21–7 SJ
- 07:44 GR – MACPHERSON, Jam 3 yd run (GOWINS, Brian kick) – 21–14 SJ
- 05:59 SJ – SAINTIL, Cleann 16 yd pass from GRIEB, Mark (HAGLUND, A.J. kick) – 28–14 SJ
- 00:54 SJ – SAINTIL, Cleann 3 yd pass from GRIEB, Mark (HAGLUND, A.J. kick) – 35–14 SJ
- 00:00 SJ – HAGLUND, A.J. 32 yd field goal – 38–14 SJ

3rd Quarter:

- 14:45 GR – MARTIN, Chris 57 yd kickoff return (GOWINS, Brian kick) – 38–21 SJ
- 10:27 SJ – HAGLUND, A.J. 28 yd field goal – 41–21 SJ
- 08:05 GR – HIGGINS, Kenny 31 yd pass from MACPHERSON, Jam (GOWINS, Brian kick) – 41–28 SJ
- 03:27 SJ – SAINTIL, Cleann 17 yd pass from GRIEB, Mark (HAGLUND, A.J. kick) – 48–28 SJ

4th Quarter:

- 14:58 GR – HIGGINS, Kenny 9 yd pass from MACPHERSON, Jam (GOWINS, Brian kick) – 48–35 SJ
- 14:25 SJ – THOMAS, Clevan 5 yd kickoff return (HAGLUND, A.J. kick) – 55–35 SJ
- 10:12 GR – MACPHERSON, Jam 1 yd run (GOWINS, Brian kick) – 55–42 SJ
- 08:56 SJ – SAINTIL, Cleann 21 yd pass from GRIEB, Mark (HAGLUND, A.J. kick failed) – 61–42 SJ
- 05:51 GR – HIGGINS, Kenny 1 yd run (MACPHERSON, Jam pass intcpt) – 61–48 SJ
- 02:25 SJ – GEATHERS, Jason 9 yd pass from GRIEB, Mark (HAGLUND, A.J. kick) – 68–48 SJ
- 00:35 GR – MAGNER, Cole 3 yd pass from MACPHERSON, Jam (GOWINS, Brian kick) – 68–55 SJ
- 00:22 SJ – GEATHERS, Jason 14 yd run (HAGLUND, A.J. kick) – 75–55 SJ
- 00:00 SJ – GEATHERS, Jason 29 yd interception return (RISLOV, Scott rush failed) – 81–55 SJ
- Officials: Referee: Riley Johnson; Umpire: Rick Podraza; Linesman: Allen Baynes; Line judge: Dana McKenzie; Back judge: Jimmy Buchanan
- Offensive Player of the Game: Cleannord Saintil (SJ)
- Defensive Player of the Game: Omarr Smith (SJ)
- Ironman Player of the Game: Jason Geathers (SJ)
