= Aaron Boone (disambiguation) =

Aaron Boone may refer to:

- Aaron Boone (born 1973), American former baseball player and coach
- Aaron Boone (American football) (born 1978), American former football player
- Aaron Boone (character), from the movie Nightbreed
