= Derrick Strong =

American football player (born 1982)

Profile
- Position: Defensive end

Personal information
- Born: April 16, 1982 (age 44); Chicago, Illinois, U.S.
- Listed height: 6 ft 4 in (1.93 m)
- Listed weight: 261 lb (118 kg)

Career information
- College: Illinois
- NFL draft: 2004: undrafted

Career history
- Rhein Fire (2005–2007); Columbus Destroyers (2008); Philadelphia Soul (2008)

Awards and highlights
- Second-team All-Big Ten (2002)

Derrick Strong (born April 16, 1982) is former American football defensive end. He was originally signed by the Rhein Fire in 2005. He played college football at Illinois. In 2008, the Arena football team, the Philadelphia Soul, acquired him. Plays Football for the Chicago Fire Department
