= 2007 Rhein Fire season =

NFL Europa team season

- General manager: Sammy Schmale
- Head coach: Rick Lantz
- Home stadium: LTU arena

Results
- Record: 4–6
- Division place: 4th
- Playoffs: Did not qualify

The 2007 Rhein Fire season was the 13th and final season for the franchise in the NFL Europa League (NFLEL). The team was led by head coach Rick Lantz in his first year, and played its home games at LTU arena in Düsseldorf, Germany. They finished the season in fourth place with a record of four wins and six losses. The National Football League (NFL) announced the closure of its European branch on June 29, ending the team's 13-year existence.

== Offseason ==
=== Free agent draft ===
2007 Rhein Fire NFLEL free agent draft selections
Draft order		Player name	Position	College
Round	Choice	Player name	Position	College
1	4	Troy Reddick	T	Auburn
2	10	Wally Dada	CB	Washington State
3	15	Jesse Boone	C	Utah
4	22	Aaron Harris	LB	Texas
5	27	Erik Jensen	TE	Iowa
6	34	DeJuan Skinner	T	West Texas A&M
7	39	Calvin Carlyle	S	Oregon State
8	46	Ryan Hoffman	DE	Shippensburg State
9	51	Scott Farley	S	Williams
10	58	Earvin Johnson	TE	UNLV
11	63	Derrick Strong	DE	Illinois
12	70	Zach Ville	DE	Missouri
13	75	Brennan Schmidt	DT	Virginia
14	82	Jimmy Dixon	FB	Georgia Tech
15	87	Chris Hawkins	CB	Marshall
16	94	Taylor Schmidt	C	San Diego State
17	99	Steve Franklin	G	Syracuse
18	106	Michael Franklin	RB	San Diego State
19	111	Jeff Green	DE	Florida A&M
20	118	Quentin Swain	LB	Florida Atlantic
21	123	John Glass	T	Rutgers
22	130	Cal Murray	RB	Miami (OH)
23	131	Mike Andrews	LB	Youngstown State

== Personnel ==
=== Staff ===
2007 Rhein Fire staff
Front office: General manager – Sammy Schmale; Head coaches: Head coach – Rick Lantz; Offensive coaches: Offensive coordinator/offensive line – Don Eck; Quarterbacks – Gary Tranquill; National coach/running backs/special teams – Sascha Gehloff; Wide receivers – Nate Poole; Tight ends – Vince Marrow	Defensive coaches: Defensive coordinator/defensive line – Larry New; Linebackers – Bernardo Harris; Defensive backs – Stan Davis; Strength and conditioning: Strength and conditioning – Nick Kolb

=== Roster ===
2007 Rhein Fire final roster
Quarterbacks: 5 Brett Elliott; 3 Cody Pickett; 4 Brian Wrobel; Running backs: 27 Charles Anthony; 47 Jimmy Dixon (IR); 20 Michael Franklin; 22 Taurean Henderson (IR); 24 Jacque Lewis; 21 Gerald Riggs Jr.; 33 John David Washington; Wide receivers: 87 Cedric Bonner (IR); 81 J. J. Outlaw; 83 Daunta Peterson (IR); 14 P. K. Sam; 82 Lauren Williams; Tight ends: 85 Erik Jensen; 80 Sean Mulcahy	Offensive linemen: 79 Jesse Boone T; 50 Jonathan Clinkscale C; 71 Steve Franklin G; 79 John Glass G/T; 78 Jimmy Martin T; 75 Albert Toeaina T; 76 Tavares Washington G; Defensive linemen: 98 Michael Bozeman DT; 99 Alex Guerrero DT (IR); 94 Ryan Hoffman DE (IR); 90 Matthew Rice DE; 96 Brennan Schmidt DT (IR); 97 Derrick Strong DE; 95 Zach Ville DT	Linebackers: 44 Craig Bailey; 45 Blake Costanzo; 57 Jamar Enzor; 52 Aaron Harris (IR); 56 Travis Harris; 55 Richard Koonce (IR); 58 Derek Rehage (IR); 51 Quentin Swain (IR); Defensive backs: 23 Calvin Carlyle FS; 26 Wale Dada CB; 28 Jermaine Hardy CB; 31 Carlos Hendricks CB; 25 Andrew Pace SS/FS; 30 Antonio Malone SS (IR); 36 Andre Maddox SS (IR); Special teams: 2 Danny Baugher P; 9 Mark Brubaker K; 6 Connor Hughes K (IR); 48 Brian Jordan LS	National players: 86 (England) Marvin Allen WR; 54 (Mexico) Eduardo Castañeda LB; 74 (Germany) Peter Heyer G; 89 (Finland) Iiro Luoto TE; 92 (Germany) Christian Mohr DE; 66 (Germany) David Odenthal C; 17 (Japan) Michihiro Ogawa WR; 91 (Mexico) Salomón Solano DT; 93 (England) Daniel Watts DT/DE; 40 (Germany) Richard Yancy SS; Rookies in italics

== Schedule ==
Week	Date	Kickoff (Note: All times are in Central European Summer Time (CEST).)	Opponent	Results		Game site	Attendance
Week	Date	Kickoff	Opponent	Final score	Team record	Game site	Attendance
1	Saturday, April 14	7:00 p.m.	Berlin Thunder	L 3–15	0–1	LTU arena	30,355
2	Friday, April 20	8:00 p.m.	at Amsterdam Admirals	W 16–10	1–1	Amsterdam ArenA	14,611
3	Saturday, April 28	7:00 p.m.	Cologne Centurions	L 6–14	1–2	LTU arena	21,347
4	Sunday, May 6	4:00 p.m.	at Hamburg Sea Devils	L 9–34	1–3	AOL Arena	19,347
5	Saturday, May 12	7:00 p.m.	Frankfurt Galaxy	W 27–24	2–3	LTU arena	27,349
6	Saturday, May 19	6:00 p.m.	at Cologne Centurions	L 17–20	2–4	RheinEnergieStadion	22,154
7	Saturday, May 26	7:00 p.m.	at Frankfurt Galaxy	L 10–23	2–5	Commerzbank-Arena	32,789
8	Sunday, June 3	4:00 p.m.	Amsterdam Admirals	W 41–38	3–5	LTU arena	20,355
9	Friday, June 8	7:00 p.m.	at Berlin Thunder	W 24–17	4–5	Olympic Stadium	12,114
10	Saturday, June 16	7:00 p.m.	Hamburg Sea Devils	L 13–17	4–6	LTU arena	22,980

== Standings ==
NFL Europa League
Team	W	L	T	PCT	PF	PA	Home	Road	STK
Hamburg Sea Devils	7	3	0	.700	231	176	4–1	3–2	W4
Frankfurt Galaxy	7	3	0	.700	254	179	5–0	2–3	W1
Cologne Centurions	6	4	0	.600	205	172	2–3	4–1	L1
Rhein Fire	4	6	0	.400	166	212	2–3	2–3	L1
Amsterdam Admirals	4	6	0	.400	194	250	3–2	1–4	W1
Berlin Thunder	2	8	0	.200	146	207	0–5	2–3	L6

== Game summaries ==
=== Week 1: vs Berlin Thunder ===
Week One: Berlin Thunder at Rhein Fire – Game summary

Quarter	1	2	3	4	Total
Berlin	0	4	4	7	15
Rhein	0	3	0	0	3

at LTU arena, Düsseldorf, Germany

- Date: Saturday, April 14
- Game time: 7:06 p.m. CEST
- Game weather: 71 °F (21.7 °C), sunny
- Game attendance: 30,355
- Referee: Carl Cheffers
- TV announcers (NFL Network): Scott Graham and Doug Graber

=== Week 2: at Amsterdam Admirals ===
Week Two: Rhein Fire at Amsterdam Admirals – Game summary

Quarter	1	2	3	4	Total
Rhein	3	3	7	3	16
Amsterdam	7	0	3	0	10

at Amsterdam ArenA, Amsterdam, Netherlands

- Date: Friday, April 20
- Game time: 8:05 p.m. CEST
- Game weather: 59 °F (15.0 °C), partly cloudy
- Game attendance: 14,611
- Referee: Terry Brown
- TV announcers (NFL Network): Rich Ackerman and Jon Ritchie

=== Week 3: vs Cologne Centurions ===
Week Three: Cologne Centurions at Rhein Fire – Game summary

Quarter	1	2	3	4	Total
Cologne	0	7	0	7	14
Rhein	3	0	3	0	6

at LTU arena, Düsseldorf, Germany

- Date: Saturday, April 28
- Game time: 7:00 p.m. CEST
- Game attendance: 21,347

=== Week 4: at Hamburg Sea Devils ===
Week Four: Rhein Fire at Hamburg Sea Devils – Game summary

Quarter	1	2	3	4	Total
Rhein	0	3	6	0	9
Hamburg	7	10	14	3	34

at AOL Arena, Hamburg, Germany

- Date: Sunday, May 6
- Game time: 4:00 p.m. CEST
- Game attendance: 19,347

=== Week 5: vs Frankfurt Galaxy ===
Week Five: Frankfurt Galaxy at Rhein Fire – Game summary

Quarter	1	2	3	4	Total
Rhein	7	0	7	13	27
Frankfurt	7	7	3	7	24

at LTU arena, Düsseldorf, Germany

- Date: Saturday, May 12
- Game time: 7:00 p.m. CEST
- Game attendance: 27,349

=== Week 6: at Cologne Centurions ===
Week Six: Rhein Fire at Cologne Centurions – Game summary

Quarter	1	2	3	4	Total
Rhein	3	7	7	0	17
Cologne	0	3	7	10	20

at RheinEnergieStadion, Cologne, Germany

- Date: Saturday, May 19
- Game time: 6:00 p.m.
- Game attendance: 22,154

=== Week 7: at Frankfurt Galaxy ===
Week Seven: Rhein Fire at Frankfurt Galaxy – Game summary

Quarter	1	2	3	4	Total
Rhein	0	10	0	0	10
Frankfurt	3	3	7	10	23

at Commerzbank-Arena, Frankfurt, Germany

- Date: Saturday, May 26
- Game time: 7:00 p.m. CEST
- Game attendance: 32,789

=== Week 8: vs Amsterdam Admirals ===
Week Eight: Amsterdam Admirals at Rhein Fire – Game summary

Quarter	1	2	3	4	Total
Amsterdam	10	10	7	11	38
Rhein	14	10	7	10	41

at LTU arena, Düsseldorf, Germany

- Date: Sunday, June 3
- Game time: 4:06 p.m. CEST
- Game weather: 66 °F (18.9 °C)
- Game attendance: 20,355
- Referee: Carl Cheffers
- TV announcers (NFL Network): Chris Carrino and Jerry Porter

=== Week 9: at Berlin Thunder ===
Week Nine: Rhein Fire at Berlin Thunder – Game summary

Quarter	1	2	3	4	Total
Rhein	14	10	0	0	24
Berlin	7	10	0	0	17

at Olympic Stadium, Berlin, Germany

- Date: Friday, June 8
- Game time: 7:00 p.m.
- Game attendance: 12,114

=== Week 10: vs Hamburg Sea Devils ===
Week Ten: Hamburg Sea Devils at Rhein Fire – Game summary

Quarter	1	2	3	4	Total
Hamburg	3	7	7	0	17
Rhein	0	10	0	3	13

at LTU arena

- Date: Saturday, June 16
- Game time: 7:00 p.m. CEST
- Game attendance: 22,980

== Honors ==
- Danny Baugher, All-NFL Europa League team selection
- Blake Costanzo, All-NFL Europa League team selection
- Jamar Enzor, Defensive Player of the Week (Week 9)
- Carlos Hendricks, Defensive Player of the Week (Week 8)
- Derek Rehage, Defensive Player of the Week (Week 6)
- P.K. Sam, Offensive Player of the Week (Week 5)
