= John Walker (American football, born 1983) =

American football player (born 1983)

Profile
- Position: Defensive specialist

Personal information
- Born: April 25, 1983 (age 43); Wahiawā, Hawai'i, U.S.
- Listed height: 6 ft 1 in (1.85 m)
- Listed weight: 200 lb (91 kg)

Career information
- High school: Los Angeles (CA) Birmingham
- College: USC
- NFL draft: 2006: undrafted

Career history
- Houston Texans (2006–2007); New York Dragons (2008); Jacksonville Sharks (2011)*
- * Offseason or practice squad member only

Career AFL statistics
- Tackles: 70
- Interceptions: 8
- Int. return yards: 165
- FF/FR: 7/3
- Passes broken up: 15
- Stats at ArenaFan.com

John Walker (born April 25, 1983) is an American former professional football defensive back.

== Early life ==
Walker attended Birmingham High School in Van Nuys, California and was a letterman in football and track.

== College career ==
Walker played college football for the University of Southern California.

== Professional career ==
Walker was signed as a free agent for the National Football League's Houston Texans practice squad in 2006. On February 4, 2008, Walker signed with the Arena Football League's New York Dragons. On October 6, 2010, Walker signed with the Jacksonville Sharks.

== Personal life ==
As a child, Walker was an actor and had roles in 7th Heaven and ER.

== See also ==
- List of Arena Football League and National Football League players
