= Jesse Boone =

American football player (born 1982)

No. 79
- Position: Center

Personal information
- Born: January 28, 1982 (age 44); Fillmore, Utah, U.S.
- Listed height: 6 ft 5 in (1.96 m)
- Listed weight: 305 lb (138 kg)

Career information
- High school: Fillmore (UT) Millard
- College: Utah (2002-2005)
- NFL draft: 2006: undrafted

Career history
- Cincinnati Bengals (2006)*; Rhein Fire (2007); Oakland Raiders (2007)*; Utah Blaze (2007–2008)*; Oakland Raiders (2008)*; Utah Blaze (2008)*; Las Vegas Locomotives (2009–2012)
- * Offseason or practice squad member only

Awards and highlights
- 2× UFL champion (2009, 2010); 2× UFL 1st Team All-League Center (2009, 2010); First-team All-MW (2005); Second-team All-MW (2004); Offensive Lineman of the Year -Utah (2005)

Jesse Rostenbach Boone (born January 28, 1982) is an American former professional football center who played during the off-season and on the practice squad for the Oakland Raiders, Cincinnati Bengals, the Rhein Fire of the NFLE, Utah Blaze, and the Las Vegas Locomotives of the UFL. He was signed by the Cincinnati Bengals as an undrafted free agent in 2006. He played college football at Utah. After his football career, he is now a company owner and CEO of Redzone Real Estate. On May 20, 2026, Boone admitted to multiple violations of Utah law involving property transactions and had his dual broker and principal broker licenses revoked.

== Early life ==
Boone attended Millard High School where he was a two-year starter on offense and defense. He was also a team captain. He helped lead his team to the regional championship in both 1998 and 1999. He lettered three years in football and once in basketball and wrestling. He was a member of the National Honor Society his last three years at Millard. He was on the honor roll all four years. He was also the student body vice president as a sophomore and the student body secretary as senior. He was also a First-team All-State and All-Region selection.

== College career ==
Boone then attended Utah, where he played Center for the Utes. As a true freshman in 2001 he redshirted. In 2002, he played in seven games, allowing him to letter in football. He averaged 93% in total blocking efficiency, with an average of 97% in pass blocking and 87% in run blocking. In the game against Michigan he recorded 100% total blocking efficiency. In 2003, He started the first three games at left tackle before an ankle injury ended his season. In his three games, he averaged four knockdowns and 79.5% overall blocking grade. He earned Academic All-MWC. In 2004, he played in and started all 12 games at center. In 11 regular season games, he played 775 snaps with 49 knockdowns. He tied for the team lead for total plays by an offensive lineman with 775. He had five games with five or more knockdowns. He recorded a career-high eight knockdowns against San Diego State with an 86% average blocking grade. He recorded seven knockdowns against both UNC and BYU with an 84% and 87% total blocking grades, respectively. He recorded back-to-back games with six knockdowns against Utah State and Air Force. He earned Academic All-MWC, he also earned Athletics Academic Honor Roll, and Second-team All-Conference. He recorded a career best 13 knockdowns against Pittsburgh in the 2005 Fiesta Bowl. As a senior in 2005 Boone was voted a team captain by his coaches and teammates. He was also a preseason All-Conference candidate at center, named to the preseason Rimington Trophy watch list, as well as the Outland and Lombardi Award watch lists. He also ranked fourth on the team with a 348lb. power clean, which measures explosive power. He once again earned Academic All-MWC, he also earned Athletics Academic Honor Roll, and this time was First-team All-Conference. The Utes went on to win a decisive victory over Georgia Tech in the 2006 Emerald Bowl. After the season, he played in the Hula Bowl.

== Professional career ==
=== Cincinnati Bengals ===
Boone went unselected in the 2006 NFL draft. Later, he was signed by the Cincinnati Bengals. However, he was waived on August 16.

=== Rhein Fire ===
Boone then spent the spring of 2007 playing for the Rhein Fire in NFL Europa where he started all 10 games at right tackle and as a wedge blocker on kickoff return.

=== Oakland Raiders (first stint) ===
On August 1, 2007, Boone signed with the Oakland Raiders. He was waived on September 2 and re-signed to the practice squad two days later.

=== Utah Blaze (first stint) ===
On October 18, 2006, Boone signed with the Utah Blaze of the Arena Football League, the same team his brother played for. On February 26, he left the team to re-join the Oakland Raiders. The next day, the Blaze released him to the Exempt: Other league list.

=== Oakland Raiders (second stint) ===
Boone was signed to a future contract by the Oakland Raiders on January 1, 2008. However, he was waived by the Raiders during final cuts on August 30.

=== Utah Blaze (second stint) ===
On September 22, 2008, Boone was he was activated off the Blaze's exempt list. However, he was released from his contract when the Arena Football League folded in 2009.

=== Las Vegas Locomotives ===
Boone was signed by the Las Vegas Locomotives of the United Football League on August 31, 2009. Jesse Boone started all seven games at center and led the team in total plays and knockdowns. The Locomotives went on to win the Inaugural UFL Championship Game vs the Florida Tuskers. Jesse was named to the All-UFL Access First-team following the season. In 2010, Boone and the Locos repeated as UFL Champions beating the Florida Tuskers for a second straight time. Boone played 100% of the Locos offensive snaps in 2010, and once again received All-League honors. In 2011, the Locos returned to the UFL Championship game, but were defeated by Marty Shottenheimer and the Virginia Destroyers. Once again Boone led the Locos offense in total plays and knockdowns in the shortened season.

== Education ==
Jesse graduated in May 2004 with a double major in Economics and Business administration. He then enrolled in the MBA program at Utah. He also scored a 640 on the GMAT. Boone graduated with a Masters in Business Administration in the spring of 2006 following his senior season of football.

== Legal ==
In a stipulated order dated May 20, 2026, Boone admitted to having committed multiple violations of Utah law involving a number of property transactions. The Salt Lake Board of Realtors found Boone in violation of multiple provisions of the National Association of Realtors Code of Ethics and imposed a $15,000 fine. He agreed that his dual broker and principal broker licenses be revoked, and that he be prohibited from reapplying for a broker's license for five years. Boone agreed to pay an additional civil penalty of $15,000.

== Personal life ==
Boone is the son of Coley Boone and Sherry Peterson. Both of his parents attended BYU. While there, his father played football. Jesse Boone, is from family of 10 children (five boys, five girls). His younger brother Jason was also an offensive lineman at Utah and played professionally for the New Orleans Saints of the NFL, the BC Lions of the CFL, and the Utah Blaze of the AFL. His older brother Aaron played wide receiver for Kentucky and spent time with the Dallas Cowboys, Chicago Bears, Carolina Panthers, Berlin Thunder NFLE, and the Utah Blaze. His sister Amy played basketball and volleyball at George Mason University and played semi-pro basketball for the San Diego Waves of the National Women's Basketball League. Jesse is now managing his real estate company, Redzone Real Estate.

== See also ==
- List of Arena Football League and National Football League players
