= Alex Guerrero (lineman) =

American gridiron football player (born 1984)

No. 99
- Position: Offensive lineman / Defensive lineman

Personal information
- Born: February 16, 1984 (age 42); Santo Domingo, Dominican Republic
- Listed height: 6 ft 1 in (1.85 m)
- Listed weight: 275 lb (125 kg)

Career information
- High school: Brea Olinda (Brea, California, U.S.)
- College: Boise State
- NFL draft: 2006: undrafted

Career history
- Kansas City Chiefs (2006)*; Seattle Seahawks (2006)*; Minnesota Vikings (2006–2007)*; → Rhein Fire (2007); Hamilton Tiger-Cats (2008)*; Boise Burn (2009); Arizona Rattlers (2010–2011)
- * Offseason or practice squad member only

Awards and highlights
- First-team All-af2 (2009)

Career AFL statistics
- Total tackles: 16
- Sacks: 5
- Forced fumbles: 3
- Stats at ArenaFan.com

Juan Alejandro Guerrero Lockward (born February 16, 1984) is a Dominican-American former professional football offensive and defensive lineman. He was signed by the Kansas City Chiefs as an undrafted free agent in 2006 after playing college football at Boise State. He played the 2009 season with the Boise Burn of af2, and in the 2010 season with the Arizona Rattlers of the Arena Football League (AFL).

Guerrero, the second oldest of three brothers, was born in the Dominican Republic and emigrated to California with his family at the age of seven. He was unable to play football until his freshman year of high school due to exceeding the weight limits in place at the youth level. As a senior at Brea Olinda High School, Guerrero recorded 73 tackles, 11 sacks, five pass breakups, four fumble recoveries, and three forced fumbles.
