= List of National Football League and Arena Football League players =

The following is a list of American football players that have played in both the Arena Football League and the National Football League.

== A ==
- Dan Alexander
- Gerald Abraham
- Otis Amey
- Scotty Anderson

== B ==
- Milton Barney
- Steve Bellisari
- Troy Bergeron
- Martin Bibla
- Damarius Bilbo
- Michael Bishop
- Phil Bogle
- Novo Bojovic
- Sherdrick Bonner
- Aaron Boone
- Jesse Boone
- Larry Brackins
- Chris Brewer
- C. J. Brewer
- Anthony Bright
- Travis Bond
- Mkristo Bruce
- Dialleo Burks
- Kelly Butler
- Danny Burmeister

== C ==
- Chris Canty
- Ron Carpenter
- Quincy Carter
- Shante Carver
- Darrin Chiaverini
- Mac Cody
- Lincoln Coleman
- José Cortéz
- Anthony Corvino
- Jerry Crafts
- Clarence Curry

== D ==
- Woody Dantzler
- Rohan Davey
- Rashied Davis
- Rod Davis
- Thabiti Davis
- Kyle DeVan
- Rob De Vita
- Chris Dieker
- Chris Doering

== E ==
- Troy Edwards
- Alonzo Ephraim
- Tory Epps
- Liam Ezekiel

== F ==
- Cory Fleming
- Lance Frazier

== G ==
- Oronde Gadsden
- Joe Germaine
- Tony Graziani
- Chris Greisen

== H ==
- George Hall
- Joe Hamilton
- Remy Hamilton
- Atnaf Harris
- Josh Harris
- Kyries Hebert
- Nick Hill
- James Hundon
- Delvin Lamar Hughley
- Bobby Hunt (born 1940)
- Rob Hunt (born 1981)
- Robert Hunt, (born 1996), offensive lineman
- Robert Hunt (born 1975), offensive lineman and coach
- Cletidus Hunt

== I ==
- Khori Ivy

== J ==
- Evington Bernard Jackson II
- Marlion Jackson
- Jermaine Jones (American football)
- Paul Justin
- Adam Juratovac

== K ==
- Kevin Kaesviharn
- Kevin Kasper
- Lincoln Kennedy
- Shaun King
- Jim Kubiak

== L ==
- Kareem Larrimore
- Jermaine Lewis
- Michael Lewis
- Jared Lorenzen

== M ==
- Tommy Maddox
- Adrian Madise
- Joe Madsen
- Rod Manuel
- Todd Marinovich
- Seth Marler
- Rasheed Marshall
- Torrance Marshall
- Mike Maslowski
- Marc May
- Andy McCollum
- Bruce McCray
- Pete McMahon
- Adrian McPherson
- Donovan Morgan

== N ==
- Browning Nagle
- Marcus Nash
- John Nix
- Al Noga

== O ==
- Steve Octavien
- Wes Ours

== P ==
- Jordan Palmer
- Billy Parker
- David Patten
- Sean Payton
- Duke Pettijohn
- Will Pettis
- Samie Parker

== R ==
- Ryan Riddle
- Dante Ridgeway
- Greg Robinson-Randall

== S ==
- Rich Salzer
- Steve Sanders
- David Saunders
- Darrell Shropshire
- Jeremy Sheffey
- Bobby Sippio
- Justin Skaggs
- Danny Southwick
- Alonzo Spellman
- Clint Stoerner
- Daleroy Stewart
- Derrick Strait
- Kevin Swayne

== T ==
- Ed Ta'amu
- Robert Thomas
- Burl Toler, III
- Nick Truesdell

== V ==
- Mike Vanderjagt

== W ==
- John Walker
- Kurt Warner
- Darius Watts
- Craig Whelihan
- Josh Wilcox
- Boo Williams
- Gillis Wilson
- Rod Windsor
- Rodney Wright
