= Nick Zeck =

American football and basketball player (born 1983)

Profile
- Positions: Offensive lineman, defensive lineman

Personal information
- Born: January 27, 1983 (age 43); West Allis, Wisconsin, U.S.
- Listed height: 6 ft 6 in (1.98 m)
- Listed weight: 320 lb (145 kg)

Career information
- College: Lakeland

Career history
- Rock River Raptors (2007); Georgia Force (2007)*; Louisville Fire (2007); Milwaukee Iron (2010); Pittsburgh Power (2011)
- * Offseason or practice squad member only
- Stats at ArenaFan.com

Nick Zeck (born January 27, 1983) is an American former professional football player. He attended Lakeland College where he played football and also basketball.

== Early life ==
Zeck attended Nathan Hale High School where he participated in football, basketball and track. His Senior year, he was named First Team All-Greater Metro Conference in both football and basketball. Zeck was selected First Team All-Illini-Badger Conference in football and First Team All-Lake Michigan Conference in basketball as a sophomore, junior and senior; he was named First Team All-Lake Michigan Conference in basketball as a sophomore, junior and senior as well.

== Professional career ==
Zeck was a member of the Louisville Fire for the final four games of the 2007 season. That same year he played for the Rock River Raptors of the United Indoor Football League. In 2008 Zeck had a tryout with the Georgia Force and was signed in May. However, he was later cut by the team but then became a member of the Chicago Rush. In 2010, he played for the Milwaukee Iron. In the 2011 season he was a member of the Pittsburgh Power.
