= Aaron Boone (American football) =

American football player (born 1978)

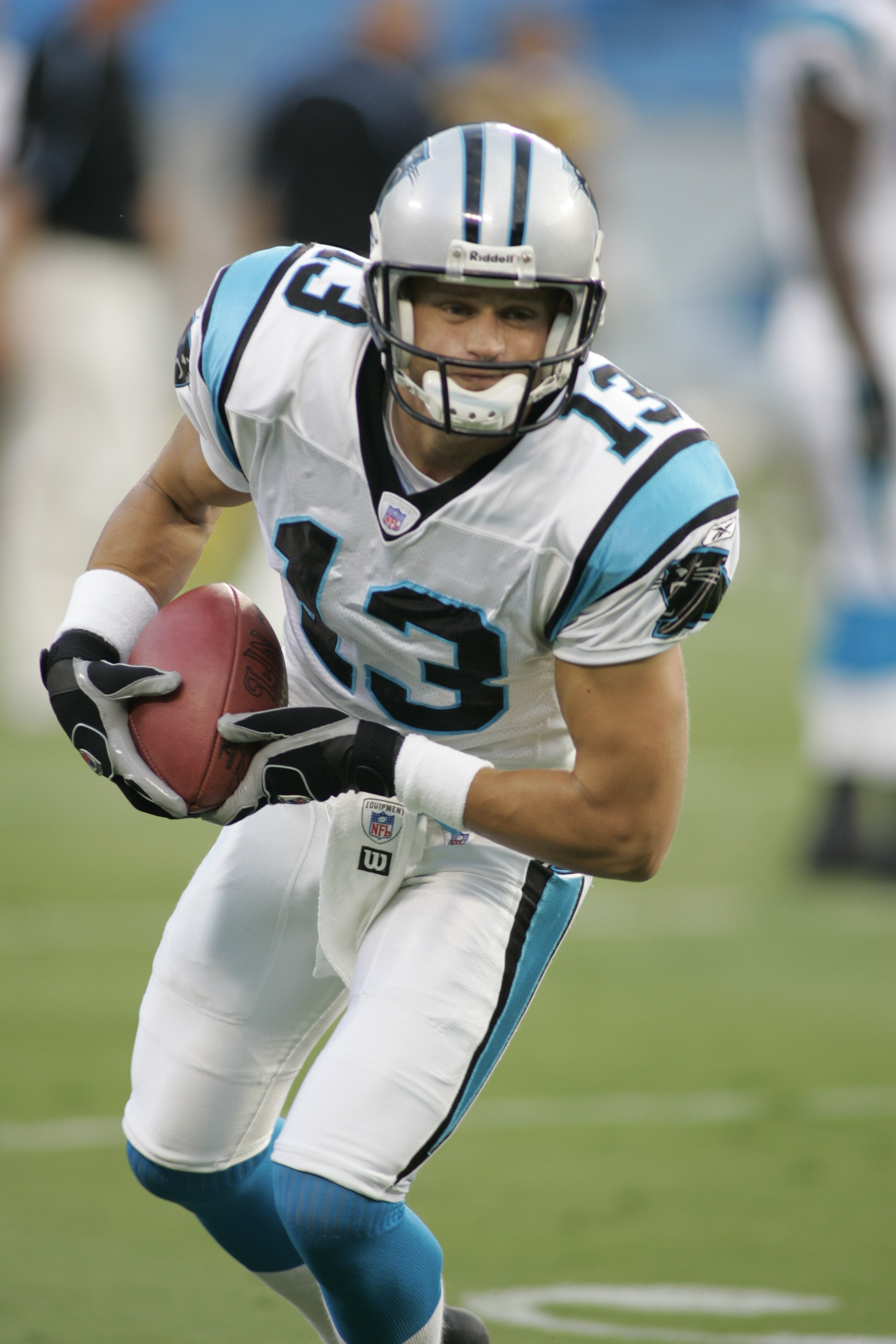
- Boone in 2005 at a pre-season game with the Carolina Panthers

No. 13, 82, 12, 1
- Position: Wide receiver

Personal information
- Born: January 13, 1978 (age 48); Provo, Utah, U.S.
- Listed height: 6 ft 3 in (1.91 m)
- Listed weight: 206 lb (93 kg)

Career information
- High school: Millard (Fillmore, Utah)
- College: Snow College (1999–2000); Kentucky (2001–2002)
- NFL draft: 2003: undrafted

Career history
- Dallas Cowboys (2003)*; Chicago Bears (2004)*; Berlin Thunder (2004–2005); Carolina Panthers (2005)*; Philadelphia Soul (2006); Kansas City Brigade (2006); Utah Blaze (2007–2008, 2010–2011)
- * Offseason or practice squad member only

Awards and highlights
- Snow College Male Athlete of the Year (2000); First-team JC Gridwire All-American (2000); NJCAA All-American (2000); Snow College Athletic Hall of Fame (2014); SEC co-leader in receiving touchdowns (2002); Kentucky leader in receptions, receiving yards, and receiving touchdowns (2002); World Bowl XII Champion (2004); First-team All-NFL Europe (2005); First-team AFL All-Rookie Team (2006); Second-team All-Arena (2010)

Career AFL statistics
- Receptions: 475
- Receiving yards: 5,203
- Touchdowns: 122
- Stats at ArenaFan.com

Aaron Rostenbach Boone (born January 13, 1978) is an American former professional American football wide receiver. Raised in Fillmore, Utah, Boone attended Millard High School, where he earned all-state honors in football, basketball, and baseball. Playing quarterback, defensive end, and kicker, he led Millard to the Utah Class 2A state football championship in 1995.

Boone transitioned to wide receiver at Snow College, earning first-team JC Gridwire All-America and NJCAA All-America honors. Over two seasons, he recorded 114 receptions for 2,150 yards and 25 touchdowns while setting school and junior college records. He later played for the Kentucky Wildcats, leading the team as a senior with 41 receptions, 706 receiving yards, and 10 receiving touchdowns. His 10 touchdown receptions tied for the Southeastern Conference lead in 2002.

Boone’s nine-year professional career included time in the NFL, NFL Europe, and the Arena Football League. He signed with the Dallas Cowboys in 2003 as part of a rookie class that included Tony Romo and Jason Witten. After signing with the Chicago Bears in 2004, Boone was allocated to the Berlin Thunder of NFL Europe. He served as a team captain as Berlin won World Bowl XII. Boone signed with the Carolina Panthers in 2005 and returned to Berlin, where he started all 10 games and earned All-NFL Europe honors after leading the league with 43 receptions. On Aug 13th, 2005 Boone caught a 26-yard touchdown pass from Stefan LeFors in Carolina’s 28–10 victory over Washington at Bank of America Stadium.

Boone subsequently played in the Arena Football League for the Philadelphia Soul, Kansas City Brigade, and Utah Blaze. He was named to the AFL All-Rookie Team in 2006 and second-team All-Arena in 2010. He finished his career as the Blaze’s all-time leader in receptions, receiving yards, and receiving touchdowns.

== Early life ==
Boone attended Millard High School in Fillmore, Utah, where he earned all-state honors in baseball, basketball, and football. He was also elected student body president. In 1994, Boone was a member of Millard's only Class 2A state championship baseball team.

As a senior in 1995, Boone played quarterback, defensive end, and kicker for Millard's Class 2A state championship football team. In the state semifinal against San Juan, he accounted for all of Millard's points in a 9–8 victory, scoring the team's only touchdown and kicking the go-ahead field goal with 17 seconds remaining. He then intercepted a San Juan pass from his defensive end position as time expired. Millard went on to defeat Grantsville in the championship game to secure the 1995 Class 2A state title.

While attending Millard, Boone worked overnight shifts at a gas station in Fillmore. During early morning hours, he practiced his footwork and used garbage cans as imaginary receivers and running backs. In 1995, then-Utah head coach Ron McBride stopped at the station while returning from a recruiting trip. After learning that Boone was Millard's quarterback and being impressed by the size of his feet and hands, McBride told him that he would remember his name. A recruiting letter from Utah arrived several days later, and the encounter led to future campus and game visits. Although Utah did not ultimately offer Boone a scholarship, Boone later credited the experience with introducing him to opportunities in college football.

== College career ==
Boone enrolled at Snow College as a walk-on quarterback in the fall of 1996. After serving a mission in Peru for the Church of Jesus Christ of Latter-day Saints, he returned to Snow in 1999 and competed for the starting quarterback position but was moved to wide receiver a week before the first game. He went on to become Snow's career leader in receiving and was named the college's Male Athlete of the Year.

In his first season as a receiver, Boone recorded 33 receptions for 645 yards and six touchdowns. As a sophomore in 2000, he shattered the record books, recording 81 receptions for 1,505 yards and 19 touchdowns, earning first-team JC Gridwire All-America and NJCAA All-America honors. He completed his Snow career with 114 receptions for 2,150 yards and 25 touchdowns. His sophomore average of approximately 150 receiving yards per game over 10 games was reported by Snow College as the highest single-season average by a receiver in NJCAA history.

Boone transferred to the University of Kentucky in 2001. He chose Kentucky over scholarship offers from Colorado, Iowa, BYU, Utah, and Kansas State, later saying that playing in the Southeastern Conference offered him greater exposure and competition as a receiver. During his junior season, Boone appeared in all 11 games and recorded 18 receptions for 268 yards and six touchdowns. Beginning with a touchdown against South Carolina, he caught a touchdown in four consecutive games, including two against Georgia.

As a senior in 2002, Boone was dubbed “Mr. Touchdown” by the Lexington Herald-Leader. He led Kentucky with 41 receptions, 706 receiving yards, and 10 receiving touchdowns. His 10 touchdown receptions tied for the SEC lead, and he led the nation in touchdown-to-reception ratio among players with at least 10 receiving touchdowns. A University of Kentucky feature published that November highlighted Boone's touchdown production and quoted receivers coach Harold Jackson as saying that “the only thing Aaron Boone does is make touchdowns.” Boone finished his Kentucky career with 59 receptions for 974 yards and 16 touchdowns in just two seasons.

On November 9, 2002, Boone caught three touchdown passes from quarterback Jared Lorenzen against LSU, which was coached by Nick Saban. His third touchdown helped Kentucky overcome a 14-point deficit and take a late 30–27 lead before LSU won 33–30 on the final play in what became known as the “Bluegrass Miracle.” The Bluegrass Miracle subsequently won the 2003 Best Play ESPY Award.

In 2014, Boone was inducted into the inaugural Snow College Athletic Hall of Fame.

== Professional career ==
=== National Football League/NFL Europe ===
After going undrafted in the 2003 NFL draft, Boone signed with the Dallas Cowboys as a free agent, joining a rookie class that included Tony Romo and Jason Witten. He participated in the Cowboys' offseason program, training camp, and preseason.

Boone signed with the Chicago Bears before the 2004 season and was allocated to the Berlin Thunder of NFL Europe. In his first season with Berlin, he recorded 13 receptions for 221 yards and four touchdowns. The Thunder finished the regular season with a 9–1 record and defeated the Frankfurt Galaxy 30–24 in World Bowl XII. Following the NFL Europe season, Boone returned to the Chicago Bears.

In 2005, Boone signed with the Carolina Panthers and was again allocated to Berlin. He started all 10 games for the Thunder and led NFL Europe with 43 receptions, totaling 582 receiving yards and five touchdowns. Boone earned All-NFL Europe honors and helped Berlin advance to World Bowl XIII. Following the NFL Europe season, Boone returned to the Carolina Panthers.

On August 13, he caught a 26-yard touchdown pass from Stefan LeFors in the Panthers' 28–10 victory over Washington at Bank of America Stadium. Boone later suffered a season-ending shoulder injury.

=== Arena Football League ===
Boone began his Arena Football League career with the Philadelphia Soul in 2006. During the season, Philadelphia traded Boone and lineman Cyron Brown to the Kansas City Brigade in exchange for offensive specialist Steve Smith. Boone appeared in the Brigade's final seven games, recording 66 receptions for 748 yards and a team-leading 19 touchdowns. He scored five touchdowns in a game twice, was named the AFL Rookie of the Month for April, and earned AFL All-Rookie Team honors.

==== Utah Blaze ====
Boone signed with the Utah Blaze for the 2007 season, allowing him to play professionally in his home state. He suffered an ankle injury during the first quarter of the season opener and appeared in seven games, recording 32 receptions for 420 yards and eight receiving touchdowns.

In 2008, Boone recorded 135 receptions for 1,527 yards and 23 touchdowns. He finished third in the AFL in receptions and eighth in receiving yards. Boone, Huey Whittaker, and J. J. McKelvey each surpassed 100 receptions, 1,500 receiving yards, and 20 touchdowns, making the Blaze the first professional football team to have three receivers reach all three marks during the same season.

After the AFL suspended operations for the 2009 season, Boone returned to the Blaze in 2010. He led Utah in every major receiving category, finishing with 146 receptions for 1,448 yards and 46 touchdowns. His totals ranked third in the league in receptions, fourth in touchdowns, and eighth in receiving yards. Boone also recorded 18 tackles on special teams and was named second-team All-Arena. On May 14 against the Milwaukee Iron, he caught seven touchdown passes, setting a Blaze single-game franchise record.

In 2011, Boone recorded 96 receptions for 1,059 yards and 26 touchdowns before a knee injury ended his season and ultimately his playing career. During an April game against the Arizona Rattlers, Boone became the Blaze's career leader in receptions, receiving yards, and receiving touchdowns. He ended his career with 475 AFL receptions, 5,202 receiving yards, and 122 receiving touchdowns and was described by The Salt Lake Tribune as “perhaps the best player in franchise history.”

== Personal life ==
Boone is the sixth of 10 children, five sons and five daughters. His father, Coley Boone, played football at Brigham Young University. His younger brothers, Jesse and Jason Boone, were offensive linemen for the University of Utah and later played professionally.

Jesse and Jason were members of Utah's undefeated 2004 team, coached by Urban Meyer, that defeated Pittsburgh in the 2005 Fiesta Bowl. The team was inducted into the University of Utah's Crimson Club Hall of Fame in 2019.

Boone's older sister Amy played basketball and volleyball at George Mason University and later played for the San Diego Waves of the National Women's Basketball League. Several members of the next generation of Boone's family have also competed in collegiate athletics.

His nephews Sonny and Taaniela “Taani” Makasini are the sons of his sister Martha. Sonny is an offensive lineman for the BYU Cougars football team. Taani signed with BYU as a linebacker after being rated the No. 12 overall recruit in Utah. He earned first-team Class 5A honors, was named the Deseret News 2023 Most Outstanding Linebacker, and helped Timpview High School win the 2023 Class 5A state championship.

Boone's niece Samantha “Sammy” Gray, the daughter of his sister Becky, competes in women's wrestling at Sacred Heart University. Another niece, Nia Thompson, is the daughter of his sister Amy and plays volleyball at George Mason. Thompson was named to the Atlantic 10 Conference All-Rookie Team as a freshman in 2025.

After retiring from football, Boone became involved in business, real estate and coaching. He is the founder of MVP Mailhouse, a direct-mail marketing company.

Boone has four children: a daughter, Kaiya, and three sons, Dawson, Rowen, and Easton. He resides in Heber City, Utah, and is a member of the Church of Jesus Christ of Latter-day Saints.

== See also ==
- List of National Football League and Arena football players
