= Zach Ville =

American football player (born 1982)

No. 99
- Position: Defensive end

Personal information
- Born: April 24, 1982 (age 44)
- Listed height: 6 ft 1 in (1.85 m)
- Listed weight: 291 lb (132 kg)

Career information
- College: Missouri
- NFL draft: 2005: undrafted

Career history
- Kansas City Chiefs (2005–2006)*; Rhein Fire (2006–2007); Saskatchewan Roughriders (2007); Grand Rapids Rampage (2008); Cleveland Gladiators (2010)
- * Offseason or practice squad member only
- Stats at ArenaFan.com

Zach Ville (born April 24, 1982) is an American former football defensive end. Ville played college football for the Missouri Tigers. He was signed by the Kansas City Chiefs as an undrafted free agent in 2005, and participated in training camp with the team before being released. He was allocated to the NFL Europa by the Chiefs in January 2006. He played two seasons (2006–07) for the NFL Europa's Rhein Fire, totaling five sacks and 37 tackles for loss from the defensive end position. He played for the Saskatchewan Roughriders of the Canadian Football League (CFL) in 2007. Prior to the start of the 2008 Arena football season he was signed by the Grand Rapids Rampage.
