= Carlos Hendricks =

American football player (born 1983)

No. 31
- Position: Defensive back

Personal information
- Born: August 13, 1983 (age 43); Montgomery, Alabama, U.S.
- Listed height: 5 ft 11 in (1.80 m)
- Listed weight: 190 lb (86 kg)

Career information
- High school: Sidney Lanier (Montgomery)
- College: Alabama-Birmingham
- NFL draft: 2006: undrafted

Career history
- Chicago Bears (2006)*; Chicago Rush (2007–2008); Tampa Bay Buccaneers (2006–2007); → Rhein Fire (2007)
- * Offseason or practice squad member only
- Stats at ArenaFan.com

Carlos Hendricks (born August 31, 1983) is an American former football defensive back who played one season with the Chicago Rush of the Arena Football League (AFL). He played college football at the University of Alabama at Birmingham. He was also a member of the Chicago Bears, Tampa Bay Buccaneers, and Rhein Fire.

== Early life ==
Hendricks played high school football at Sidney Lanier High School in Montgomery, Alabama. He recorded five interceptions and 75 tackles his senior year.

== College career ==
Hendricks played for the UAB Blazers from 2001 to 2005. He was given a medical redshirt in 2004. He played in 46 games, starting 33 and recorded career totals of 172 tackles, five interceptions, 19 passes defensed, three forced fumbles and six fumble recoveries during his college career.

== Professional career ==
Hendricks signed with the Chicago Bears of the National Football League (NFL) on May 16, 2006, after going undrafted in the 2006 NFL draft. He was released by the Bears on September 1, 2006.

Hendricks signed with the AFL's Chicago Rush in October 2006. He spent the 2007 season on the team's Other League Exempt list after being signed by the Tampa Bay Buccaneers. He played for the Rush during the 2008 season, recording 8.5 tackles and 3 pass breakups.

On November 16, 2006, Hendricks was signed to the practice squad of the Tampa Bay Buccaneers of the NFL. He was released by the team on November 27, 2006. He was re-signed to the Buccaneers' practice squad on December 29, 2006. Hendricks signed with the Buccaneers on January 17, 2007. He played for the Rhein Fire of NFL Europa during the 2007 season after being assigned to the team on February 24, 2007. He was placed on injured reserve by the Buccaneers on September 2, 2007. He was released on September 11, 2007.
