= 2007 Tampa Bay Storm season =

Arena Football League team season

- Head coach: Tim Marcum
- Home stadium: St. Pete Times Forum

Results
- Record: 9–7
- Division place: 2nd
- Playoffs: L 56–55 vs. Columbus

The 2007 Tampa Bay Storm season was the 21st season for the team in the Arena Football League and 17th in Tampa. They tried to improve upon their 7–9 record from 2006 in the Southern Division, and looking to get back to the playoffs for the first time since 2005. The apparent cause of their turnaround from an 0–5 start was the replacement of John Kaleo at quarterback with Brett Dietz. Whereas they were a combined 1–6 under Kaleo and the injured Stoney Case, they were 8–1 under Dietz. On June 13, two weeks after being placed on "left squad", T.T. Toliver was released by the Storm and subsequently signed with the Orlando Predators. On June 23, they clinched the #3 seed in the National Conference, and hosted a home playoff game vs. the #6 seed in the National Conference, the Columbus Destroyers, which they lost 56-55.

== Coaching ==
Tim Marcum, head coach since 1995, entered his 13th year as Storm head coach.

== Season schedule ==
Week	Date	Opponent	Home/Away	Result
1	March 2	Orlando Predators	Home	L 52–27
2	March 10	Dallas Desperados	Away	L 59–40
3	March 17	Georgia Force	Home	L 61–47
4	March 23	New York Dragons	Home	L 59–52
5	March 31	San Jose SaberCats	Away	L 69–49
6	April 7	New Orleans Voodoo	Home	W 66–43
7	April 14	Orlando Predators	Away	L 61–37
8		Bye	Week	
9	April 29	Columbus Destroyers	Home	W 34–32
10	May 6	Austin Wranglers	Away	W 66–45
11	May 12	Los Angeles Avengers	Away	W 40–37
12	May 18	Arizona Rattlers	Home	W 59–50
13	May 26	Georgia Force	Away	L 52–38
14	June 2	New Orleans Voodoo	Away	W 61–55
15	June 9	Philadelphia Soul	Home	W 69–59
16	June 16	Grand Rapids Rampage	Away	W 69–40
17	June 23	Austin Wranglers	Home	W 55–51

== Playoff schedule ==
Round	Date	Opponent	Home/Away	Result
1st	June 30	(6) Columbus Destroyers	Home	L 56–55

== Personnel moves ==
=== Acquired ===
- Brett Dietz was signed off of the Kansas City Brigade's practice squad

=== Departures ===
- Shane Stafford signed with the Orlando Predators in the off-season
- T.T. Toliver was released on June 12 after a 2-week dispute with head coach Tim Marcum and also signed with Orlando

=== Roster ===
Tampa Bay Storm roster
Quarterbacks: 1 Brett Dietz; Running backs: 32 Marvin Brown RB; 2 Jarrod Penright FB; Wide receivers: 14 Hank Edwards WR; 22 Lawrence Samuels WR; 17 Terrill Shaw WR; 6 Karl Williams WR; Offensive linemen: 65 Ernest Certain OL; 75 Tom Kaleita OL; 75 Lincoln Kennedy OL; 66 Marcus Owen OL; Defensive linemen: 93 Tom Briggs DL; 65 Ernest Certain DL; 75 Lincoln Kennedy DL; 8 Tim McGill OL; 90 Mark Word DL	Linebackers: 32 Marvin Brown LB; 22 Lawrence Samuels LB; Defensive backs: 5 Jeroid Johnson DB; 26 Khalid Naziruddin DB; 21 Traco Rachal DB; 12 Bo Rogers DB; 17 Terrill Shaw DB; Special teams: 4 Seth Marler K; 6 Karl Williams KR; Injured players: 15 Stoney Case QB; 34 Rodney Filer FB/LB; 88 Geir Gudmundsen OL; 28 Byron Jones DB; 3 John Kaleo QB; 57 Clint Mitchell OL/DL; 73 Dwayne Morgan OL; 50 Rod Williams OL/DL; 44 Nyle Wiren OL/DL	Practice squad: ? Jeremy Darveau DL; ? Tyrone Timmons WR; 22 Alex Wallace DB; Refused to Report: 95 Howard Green OL/DL; Exempt List: ? Kevin House WR/DD

== Stats ==
=== Offense ===
==== Quarterback ====
Place	Player Name	Completions	Attempts	Comp%	Yards	TD's	INT's	Long	Rating
1	Brett Dietz	199	302	65.9%	2395	47	7	47	119.3
2	John Kaleo	133	199	66.8%	1464	18	6	40	98.5
3	Stoney Case	48	73	65.8%	540	6	2	45	96.8

==== Running backs ====
Place	Player Name	Car	Yards	Avg	TD's	Long
1	Torrance Marshall	55	107	1.9	17	9
2	Rodney Filer	27	96	3.6	9	14
3	Marvin Brown	9	43	4.8	1	23
4	*T.T. Toliver	5	24	4.8	0	13
5	John Kaleo	8	16	2	1	7
6	Brett Dietz	10	7	0.7	2	4
7	Stoney Case	4	4	1	2	3
8	Clenton Crossley	6	3	0.5	0	3
9	Rod Williams	1	1	1	0	1
10	Jarrod Penright	3	−3	−1	0	1

==== Wide receivers ====
Place	Player Name	Rec.	Yards	Avg	TD's	Long
1	Terrill Shaw	101	1411	14	24	47
2	*T.T. Toliver	99	1193	12.1	17	45
3	Lawrence Samuels	122	1143	9.4	15	35
4	Hank Edwards	22	251	11.4	7	29
5	Karl Williams	10	140	14	3	39
6	Marvin Brown	2	35	17.5	1	20
7	Tom Kaleita	3	26	8.7	1	12
8	Torrance Marshall	3	23	7.7	0	9
9	Rodney Filer	3	20	6.7	0	10
10	Jesse Martine	2	14	7	1	12

==== Touchdowns ====
Place	Player Name	TD's	Rush	Rec	Ret	Pts
1	Terrill Shaw	24	0	24	0	144
2	*T.T. Toliver	17	0	17	0	102
2	Torrance Marshall	17	17	0	0	102
4	Lawrence Samuels	15	0	15	0	96
5	Rodney Filer	9	9	0	0	54
6	Hank Edwards	7	0	7	0	42
7	Stoney Case	2	2	0	0	12
8	Brett Dietz	2	2	0	0	12
9	Karl Williams	2	0	1	1	12
10	Ernest Certain	1	0	1	0	6
11	Tom Kaleita	1	0	1	0	6
12	John Kaleo	1	1	0	0	6
13	Marvin Brown	1	1	0	0	6
13	Lincoln Kennedy	1	0	0	1	6

=== Defense ===
Place	Player Name	Tackles	Solo	Assisted	Sack	Solo	Assisted	INT	Yards	TD's	Long
1	Jeroid Johnson	96	88	16	0	0	0	10	152	2	45
2	Khalid Naziruddin	70	65	10	0	0	0	3	62	0	24
3	Traco Rachal	69.5	64	11	0	0	0	2	11	0	7
4	Lawrence Samuels	38	31	14	0	0	0	3	38	1	16
5	Alex Wallace	3.5	31	8	0	0	0	1	0	0	0
6	Tom Briggs	28.5	25	7	5	5	0	0	0	0	0
7	Bo Rogers	22.5	21	3	0	0	0	0	0	0	0
8	Tim McGill	18	16	4	5	5	0	0	0	0	0
9	Torrance Marshall	17.5	17	1	1	1	0	0	0	0	0
10	Mark Word	14	13	2	2	2	0	0	0	0	0
11	*T.T. Toliver	12	11	2	0	0	0	0	0	0	0
12	Bryon Jones	9	7	4	0	0	0	0	0	0	0
13	Jarrod Penright	8.5	7	3	0	0	0	0	0	0	0
14	Nyle Wiren	7	5	4	0	0	0	2	14	0	14
15	Ernest Certain	5.5	3	5	0	0	0	0	0	0	0
16	Marcus Owen	5	4	2	0	0	0	0	0	0	0
17	Terrill Shaw	4	4	0	0	0	0	0	0	0	0
18	Karl Williams	4	4	0	0	0	0	0	0	0	0
19	Seth Marler	3	3	0	0	0	0	0	0	0	0
20	Rodney Filer	3	3	0	0	0	0	0	0	0	0
21	Hank Edwards	3	1	4	0	0	0	0	0	0	0
22	John Kaleo	1	1	0	0	0	0	0	0	0	0
23	Lincoln Kennedy	1	1	0	0	0	0	0	0	0	0
24	Marvin Brown	1	1	0	0	0	0	0	0	0	0

=== Special teams ===
==== Kick return ====
Place	Player Name	Ret	Yards	TD's	Long	Avg	Ret	Yards	TD's	Long	Avg
1	Karl Williams	46	810	1	55	17.6	0	0	0	0	0
2	*T.T. Toliver	23	458	0	41	19.9	4	78	0	28	19.5
3	Terrill Shaw	7	50	0	17	7.1	0	0	0	0	0
4	Lawrence Samuels	1	3	0	3	3	0	0	0	0	0
5	Jeroid Johnson	0	0	0	0	0	3	46	0	33	15.3
6	Alex Wallace	0	0	0	0	0	1	5	0	5	5
7	Lincoln Kennedy	0	0	0	0	0	1	4	0	4	4
8	John Kaleo	0	0	0	0	0	1	0	0	0	0
8	Traco Rachal	1	0	0	0	0	0	0	0	0	0

==== Kicking ====
Place	Player Name	Extra pt.	Extra pt. Att.	FG	FGA	Long	Pct.	Pts
1	Seth Marler	92	99	16	20	41	0.800	140
2	Matt Leach	4	6	0	1	0	0.000	4
3	Bill Gramatica	0	4	1	3	37	0.333	3

*Waived

== Playoff Stats ==
=== Offense ===
==== Quarterback ====
Player	Comp.	Att.	Comp%	Yards	TD's	INT's
Brett Dietz	27	40	67.5	315	6	1

==== Running backs ====
Player	Car.	Yards	Avg.	TD's	Long
Marvin Brown	2	8	4	0	4
Torrance Marshall	2	4	2	1	3
Brett Dietz	2	2	2	1	2

==== Wide receivers ====
Player	Rec.	Yards	Avg.	TD's	Long
Lawrence Samuels	11	116	10.5	1	18
Terrill Shaw	9	112	12.4	4	26
Hank Edwards	3	39	13	1	17
Karl Williams	3	39	13	0	17
Marvin Brown	1	9	9	0	9

=== Special teams ===
==== Kick return ====
Player	Ret	Yards	Avg	Long
Karl Williams	5	99	19.8	35
Terrill Shaw	3	8	2.7	8
Jeroid Johnson	1	13	13	13

==== Kicking ====
Player	Extra pt.	Extra pt. Att.	FG	FGA	Long	Pts
Seth Marler	7	8	0	1	–	7

== Regular season ==
=== Week 1: vs Orlando Predators ===
	1	2	3	4	Total
ORL	21	7	7	17	52
TAM	6	6	9	6	27

at the St. Pete Times Forum, Tampa, Florida

The Storm opened their season with a lousy performance March 2 against their rivals the Orlando Predators. Kicker Bill Gramatica missed four extra point attempts while Predators player DeAndrew Rubin scored on two long plays to give Orlando a 14–0 lead that would hold up for the entire game as they won going away 52–27.

Scoring summary:

1st Quarter:

- 14:30 ORL- DeAndrew Rubin 34-yard pass from Shane Stafford (Jay Taylor kick) – 7–0 ORL
- 07:48 ORL- DeAndrew Rubin 42-yard pass from Shane Stafford (Jay Taylor kick) – 14–0 ORL
- 04:28 ORL- Jimmy Fryzel 19-yard pass from Shane Stafford (Jay Taylor kick) – 21–0 ORL
- 03:07 TAM- T.T. Toliver 27-yard pass from John Kaleo (Bill Gramatica kick failed) – 21–6 ORL

2nd Quarter:

- 12:08 TAM- Rodney Filer 1-yard run (Bill Gramatica kick failed) – 21–12 ORL
- 00:00 ORL- Javarus Dudley 1-yard run (Jay Taylor kick) – 28–12 ORL

3rd Quarter:

- 10:38 TAM- Bill Gramatica 36-yard field goal – 28–15 ORL
- 08:27 ORL- DeAndrew Rubin 28-yard pass from Shane Stafford (Jay Taylor kick) – 35–15 ORL
- 05:57 TAM- Demetris Bendross 39-yard pass from John Kaleo (Bill Gramatica kick failed) – 35–18 ORL

4th Quarter:

- 15:00 ORL- Jay Taylor 20-yard field goal – 38–18 ORL
- 11:48 TAM- Demetris Bendross 18-yard pass from John Kaleo (Bill Gramatica kick failed) – 38–24 ORL
- 06:01 ORL- Shane Stafford 3-yard run (Jay Taylor kick) – 45–24 ORL
- 02:08 ORL- Javarus Dudley 37-yard pass from Shane Stafford (Jay Taylor kick – 52–24 ORL
- ??:?? TAM- Bill Gramatica ??-yard field goal – 52–27 ORL

Attendance: 15,619

- Offensive player of the game: Shane Stafford (ORL)
- Defensive player of the game: Ryan Bowers (ORL)
- Ironman of the game: DeAndrew Rubin (ORL)

Team	1st Down.	Rush. Yds	Pass. Yds	Fumbles/lost	Fumble yds	Penal./yds	TOP	3rd Down.	4th Down.
ORL	19	20	329	1/0	15	6/32	31:12	3/6	0/1
TB	17	13	289	2/1	0	7/35	28:48	4/8	1/1

=== Week 2: at Dallas Desperados ===
	1	2	3	4	Total
TAM	13	6	7	14	40
DAL	13	13	13	20	59

at the American Airlines Center, Dallas, Texas

In their opening road game, they again lost soundly. Despite being tied as late as the third quarter, Will Pettis, on two long plays (56 and 23 yards, respectively) gave Dallas a lead they would not lose. They went on to dominate the fourth quarter as well to win 59–40 and pick up their second victory while Tampa Bay went home to play Georgia still looking for their second victory.

Scoring summary:

1st Quarter:

- 14:10 DAL – Will Pettis 30 yd pass from Clint Dolezel (Dustin Bell kick failed) – 6–0 DAL
- 08:37 TAM – Rodney Filer 1 yd run (Matt Leach kick) – 7–6 TB
- 05:08 DAL – Marcus Nash 4 yd pass from Clint Dolezel (Dustin Bell kick) – 13–7 DAL
- 03:10 TAM – T.T. Toliver 40 yd pass from John Kaleo (Matt Leach kick failed) – 13–13

2nd Quarter:

- 14:39 DAL – Will Pettis 10 yd pass from Clint Dolezel (Dustin Bell kick failed) – 19–13 DAL
- 08:58 TAM – Rodney Filer 2 yd run (Matt Leach kick failed) – 19–19
- 05:37 DAL – Terrance Dotsy 8 yd pass from Clint Dolezel (Dustin Bell kick) – 26–19 DAL

3rd Quarter:

- Lawrence Samuels 15 yd pass from John Kaleo (Matt Leach kick) – 26–26
- 12:06 DAL – Will Pettis 56 yd kickoff return (Dustin Bell kick failed) – 32–26 DAL
- 05:34 DAL – Will Pettis 23 yd pass from Clint Dolezel (Dustin Bell kick) – 39–26 DAL

4th Quarter:

- 13:22 TAM – Rodney Filer 1 yd run (Matt Leach kick) – 39–33 DAL
- 10:22 DAL – Will Pettis 14 yd pass from Clint Dolezel (Clint Dolezel pass failed) – 45–33 DAL
- 03:02 DAL – Josh White 9 yd pass from Clint Dolezel (Dustin Bell kick) – 52–33 DAL
- 00:55 TAM – T.T. Toliver 15 yd pass from John Kaleo (Matt Leach kick) – 52–40 DAL
- 00:10 DAL – Willis Marshall 2 yd pass from Clint Dolezel (Dustin Bell kick) – 59–40 DAL

Attendance: 13,805

- Offensive player of the game: Will Pettis (DAL)
- Defensive player of the game: Duke Pettijohn (DAL)
- Ironman of the game: Will Pettis (DAL)

Recap: DAL 59 TAM 40

Team	1st Down.	Rush. Yds	Pass. Yds	Fumbles/lost	Fumble yds	Penal./yds	TOP	3rd Down.	4th Down.
TB	19	31	271	1/0	0	10/56	30:55	3/7	1/3
DAL	23	30	294	0/0	0	11/83	29:05	3/4	0/1

=== Week 3: vs Georgia Force ===
	1	2	3	4	Total
GEO	14	12	14	21	61
TAM	13	6	21	7	47

at the St. Pete Times Forum, Tampa, Florida

Still looking for their first win in week 3 vs. divisional rival the Georgia Force, the Storm would keep a close game well into the 2nd half of the game. Both Dan Burnett and Seth Marler missed on two extra point attempts. For the Force, however, they would prevail on the strength of a 21-point fourth quarter to finish the Storm and win 61–47, which left the Storm again without their first victory.

Scoring summary:

1st Quarter:

- 14:18 GEO – Derek Lee 4 yd pass from Chris Greisen (Dan Burnett kick) – 7–0 GEO
- 10:41 TAM – T.T. Toliver 11 yd pass from John Kaleo (Seth Marler kick failed) – 7–6 GEO
- 07:53 GEO – Chris Jackson 4 yd pass from Chris Greisen (Dan Burnett kick) – 14–6 GEO
- 01:09 TAM – Rodney Filer 7 yd run (Seth Marler kick) – 14–13 GEO

2nd Quarter:

- 13:41 GEO – Troy Bergeron 27 yd pass from Chris Greisen (Dan Burnett kick failed) – 20–13 GEO
- 04:17 GEO – Troy Bergeron 7 yd pass from Chris Greisen (Dan Burnett kick blocked) – 26–13 GEO
- 00:55 TAM – T.T. Toliver 17 yd pass from John Kaleo (Seth Marler kick failed) – 26–19 GEO

3rd Quarter:

- 13:00 TAM – Rodney Filer 3 yd run (Seth Marler kick) – 26–26
- 10:50 GEO – Troy Bergeron 5 yd pass from Chris Greisen (Dan Burnett kick) – 33–26 GEO
- 08:43 TAM – Rodney Filer 4 yd run (Seth Marler kick) – 33–33
- 05:26 GEO – Chris Jackson 6 yd pass from Chris Greisen (Dan Burnett kick) – 40–33 GEO
- 02:14 TAM – Rodney Filer 14 yd run (Seth Marler kick) – 40–40

4th Quarter:

- 12:36 GEO – Matt Huebner 1 yd run (Dan Burnett kick) – 47–40 GEO
- 09:27 GEO – Derek Lee 22 yd pass from Chris Greisen (Dan Burnett kick) – 54–40 GEO
- 08:35 GEO – Willie Gary 0 yd net recovery (Dan Burnett kick) – 61–40 GEO
- 04:28 TAM – Karl Williams 6 yd pass from John Kaleo (Seth Marler kick)

Attendance: 13,664

Recap: GEO 61 TAM 47

- Offensive player of the game: Chris Greisen (GEO)
- Defensive player of the game: Willie Gary (GEO)
- Ironman of the game: Rodney Filer (GEO)

Team	1st Down.	Rush. Yds	Pass. Yds	Fumbles/lost	Fumble yds	Penal./yds	TOP	3rd Down.	4th Down.
GEO	21	18	296	1/1	0	9/41	23:42	1/3	0/0
TB	24	47	242	2/2	0	9/63	36:18	4/7	0/2

=== Week 4: vs New York Dragons ===
	1	2	3	4	Total
NYD	14	17	7	21	59
TAM	21	17	7	7	52

at the St. Pete Times Forum, Tampa, Florida

Tampa Bay finally looked like they would pick up their first victory of the season as they seemingly always answered New York's touchdowns into the early part of the 4th quarter. But, despite a 52–38 lead, they lost 59–52 when they allowed a touchdown with 31 seconds left to give New York their first lead and only lead of the game. This left the Storm still looking for their first win of 2007.

Scoring summary:

1st Quarter:

- 13:22 TAM – T.T. Toliver 13 yd pass from John Kaleo (Seth Marler kick) – 7–0 TAM
- 10:31 NYD – Mike Horacek 22 yd pass from Rohan Davey (Carter Warley kick) – 7–7
- 05:05 TAM – T.T. Toliver 8 yd pass from John Kaleo (Seth Marler kick) – 14–7 TAM
- 04:01 TAM – Lawrence Samuels 7 yd interception return (Seth Marler kick) – 21–7 TAM
- 01:31 NYD – Chris Anthony 6 yd pass from Rohan Davey (Carter Warley kick) – 21–14 TAM

2nd Quarter:

- 13:12 TAM – Ernest Certain 12 yd pass from John Kaleo (Seth Marler kick) – 28–14 TAM
- 10:25 NYD – Chris Anthony 15 yd pass from Rohan Davey (Carter Warley kick) – 28–21 TAM
- 07:28 TAM – Rodney Filer 7 yd run (Seth Marler kick) – 35–21 TAM
- 03:01 NYD – Kevin Swayne 4 yd pass from Rohan Davey (Carter Warley kick) – 35–28 TAM
- 00:10 TAM – Seth Marler 19 yd field goal – 38–28 TAM
- 00:00 NYD – Carter Warley 43 yd field goal – 38–31 TAM

3rd Quarter:

- 11:45 TAM – Lawrence Samuels 26 yd pass from John Kaleo (Seth Marler kick) – 45–31 TAM
- 08:58 NYD – Ja'Mar Toombs 24 yd run (Carter Warley kick) – 45–38 TAM

4th Quarter:

- 14:12 TAM – John Kaleo 7 yd run (Seth Marler kick) – 52–38 TAM
- 11:25 NYD – Mike Horacek 24 yd pass from Rohan Davey (Carter Warley kick) – 52–45 TAM
- 06:24 NYD – Ja'Mar Toombs 1 yd run (Carter Warley kick) – 52–52
- 00:31 NYD – Mike Horacek 38 yd pass from Rohan Davey (Carter Warley kick) – 59–52 NYD

Attendance: 13,134

Recap: NYD 59 TAM 52

Team	1st Down.	Rush. Yds	Pass. Yds	Fumbles/lost	Fumble yds	Penal./yds	TOP	3rd Down.	4th Down.
NY	24	41	295	2/2	0	5/30	27:10	2/3	0/0
TB	20	30	273	1/1	5	12/92	32:50	4/9	3/4

=== Week 5: at San Jose SaberCats ===
	1	2	3	4	Total
TAM	14	21	7	7	49
SJS	28	20	14	7	69

at the HP Pavilion, San Jose, California

Heading out west, still winless, the Storm took on the 1–2 San Jose SaberCats. And again, the Storm would come up on the losing end as they lost soundly 69–49 to San Jose. San Jose scored two touchdowns in the first 2:36 of the game which gave them a quick 14–0 lead that they would not relinquish, as the Storm headed home 0–5 and their playoff hopes seemingly dashed. In this game, Stoney Case replaced John Kaleo as starting quarterback.

Scoring summary:

1st Quarter:

- 13:39 SJS – Ben Nelson 33-yd pass from Mark Grieb (A.J. Haglund kick) – 7–0 SJ
- 12:24 SJS – A.J. Haglund 4-yd fumble recovery (A.J. Haglund kick) – 14–0 SJ
- 09:45 TAM – T.T. Toliver 28-yd pass from Stoney Case (Seth Marler kick) – 14–7 SJ
- 07:09 SJS – Ben Nelson 8 yd pass from Mark Grieb (A.J. Haglund kick) – 21–7 SJ
- 02:00 TAM – Torrance Marshall 2 yd run (Seth Marler kick) – 21–14 SJ
- 00:46 SJS – James Roe 27 yd pass from Mark Grieb (A.J. Haglund kick) – 28–14 SJ

2nd Quarter:

- 11:30 TAM – Torrance Marshall 1 yd run (Seth Marler kick) – 28–21 SJ
- 10:20 SJS – Ben Nelson 5 yd pass from Mark Grieb (A.J. Haglund kick failed) – 34–21 SJ
- 08:11 TAM – Torrance Marshall 2 yd run (Seth Marler kick) – 34–28 SJ
- 04:56 SJS – Rodney Wright 25 yd pass from Mark Grieb (A.J. Haglund kick) – 41–28 SJ
- 03:30 SJS – Marquis Floyd 46 yd interception return (A.J. Haglund kick) – 48–28 SJ
- 00:19 TAM – Terrill Shaw 5 yd pass from Stoney Case (Seth Marler kick) – 48–35 SJ

3rd Quarter:

- 12:07 SJS – Rodney Wright 31 yd pass from Mark Grieb (A.J. Haglund kick) – 55–35 SJ
- 09:04 TAM – T.T. Toliver 8 yd pass from Stoney Case (Seth Marler kick) – 55–42 SJ
- 06:48 SJS – Ben Nelson 13 yd pass from Mark Grieb (A.J. Haglund kick) – 62–42 SJ

4th Quarter:

- 13:56 SJS – James Roe 11 yd pass from Mark Grieb (A.J. Haglund kick) – 69–42 SJ
- 06:44 TAM – Stoney Case 3 yd run (Seth Marler kick) – 69–49 SJ

Attendance: 13,916

Recap: SJ 69 TAM 49

- Offensive player of the game: Mark Grieb (SJ)
- Defensive player of the game: Marquis Floyd (SJ)
- Ironman of the game: A.J. Haglund (SJ)

Team	1st Down.	Rush. Yds	Pass. Yds	Fumbles/lost	Fumble yds	Penal./yds	TOP	3rd Down.	4th Down.
TB	23	22	271	2/2	0	7/46	33:38	1/6	3/4
SJ	22	24	284	0/0	4	8/42	26:22	1/1	0/0

=== Week 6: vs New Orleans VooDoo ===
	1	2	3	4	Total
NO	13	10	6	14	43
TAM	14	28	7	17	66

at the St. Pete Times Forum, Tampa, Florida

Heading home, the Storm finally won their first game of the season in convincing fashion, with a 66–43 drumming of the New Orleans VooDoo, playing their first game vs. New Orleans since 2005 due to Hurricane Katrina. Unfortunately for Tampa Bay, Stoney Case, who replaced John Kaleo as quarterback, was injured for the rest of the season, which left Kaleo as starting QB again.

Scoring summary:

1st Quarter:

- 10:51 NVD- Jacques Rumph 10-yard pass from Steve Bellisari (Eric Houle kick failed) – 6–0 NO
- 06:57 TAM- Torrance Marshall 7-yard run (Seth Marler kick good) – 7–6 TAM
- 05:48 NO – Jacques Rumph 25 yd TD pass from Steve Bellisari (Eric Houle kick good) – 13–7 NO
- 04:07 TAM- Terrill Shaw 31 yd TD pass from Stoney Case (Seth Marler kick good) – 14–13 TAM

2nd Quarter:

- 11:51 TAM- Torrance Marshall 7 Yd Run (Seth Marler Kick) – 21–13 TAM
- 07:24 TAM- Stoney Case 1 Yd Run (Seth Marler Kick) – 28–13 TAM
- 04:21 NO – Jacques Rumph 39 Yd Pass From Steve Bellisari (Eric Houle Kick) – 28–20 TAM
- 00:53 TAM- Lawrence Samuels 16 Yd Pass From Stoney Case (Seth Marler Kick) – 35–20 TAM
- 00:20 TAM- Terrill Shaw 6 Yd Pass From Stoney Case (Seth Marler Kick) – 42–20 TAM
- 00:00 NO – Eric Houle 42 yd field goal – 42–23 TAM

3rd Quarter:

- 05:38 TAM- Jeroid Johnson 45 Yd Interception Return (Seth Marler Kick) – 49–23 TAM
- 02:33 NO – James Jordan 4 Yd Pass From Steve Bellisari (Pat Failed) – 49–29 TAM

4th Quarter:

- 14:55 TAM- Seth Marler 19 yd field goal – 52–29 TAM
- 13:41 NO – Kenny Henderson 42 Yd Pass From Steve Bellisari (Eric Houle Kick) – 52–36 TAM
- 12:33 TAM- Torrance Marshall 1 Yd Run (Seth Marler Kick) – 59–36 TAM
- 05:22 TAM- T.T. Toliver 4 Yd Pass From John Kaleo (Seth Marler Kick) – 66–36 TAM
- 00:39 NO – Tremaine Neal 2 Yd Pass From Steve Bellisari (Eric Houle Kick) – 66–43 TAM

Attendance: 16,644

- Offensive player of the game: Stoney Case (TB)
- Defensive player of the game: Nyle Wiren (CLB)
- Ironman of the game: Lawrence Samuels (TB)

Team	1st Down.	Rush. Yds	Pass. Yds	Fumbles/lost	Fumble yds	Penal./yds	TOP	3rd Down.	4th Down.
NO	19	25	309	3/2	0	8/42	32:08	3/9	2/3
TB	20	38	228	2/2	26	11/81	27:52	1/3	0/1

=== Week 7: at Orlando Predators ===
	1	2	3	4	Total
TAM	3	6	7	21	37
ORL	0	35	12	14	61

at Hummer Field at Amway Arena, Orlando, Florida

Scoring summary:

1st Quarter:

- 4:27 TB- Seth Marler 33 Yard Field Goal – 3–0 TB

2nd Quarter:

- 1:45 ORL- Javarus Dudley 9 Yard Pass From Shane Stafford (Jay Taylor Kick) – 7–3 ORL
- 5:20 ORL- Greg White 17 Yard Fumble Return (Jay Taylor Kick) – 14–3 ORL
- 10:53 TB- Torrance Marshall 5 Yard Run (Two-Point Pass Conversion Failed) – 14–9 ORL
- 14:04 ORL- Javarus Dudley 19 Yard Pass From Shane Stafford (Jay Taylor Kick) – 21–9 ORL
- 14:06 ORL- Kevin Nagle Recovered Fumble In End Zone (Jay Taylor Kick) – 28–9 ORL
- 14:40 ORL- Marlon Moye-Moore 52 Yard Fumble Return (Jay Taylor Kick) – 35–9 ORL

3rd Quarter:

- 5:33 ORL- Jay Taylor 23 Yard – 38–9 ORL
- 6:21 TB- Torrance Marshall 2 Yard Run (Seth Marler Kick) – 38–16 ORL
- 9:42 ORL- Javarus Dudley 23 Yard Pass From Shane Stafford (Jay Taylor Kick) – 45–16 ORL

4th Quarter:

- 2:27 TB- Terrill Shaw 4 Yard Pass From John Kaleo (Seth Marler Kick) – 45–23 ORL
- 4:58 ORL- J.R. Russell 8 Yard Pass From Shane Stafford (Jay Taylor Kick) – 52–23 ORL
- 7:59 TB- Terrill Shaw 11 Yard Pass From John Kaleo (Seth Marler Kick) – 52–30 ORL
- 9:25 ORL- Charles Hill 11 Yard Pass From Shane Stafford (Jay Taylor Kick) – 59–30 ORL
- 13:15 TB- Lawrence Samuels 3 Yard Pass From John Kaleo (Seth Marler Kick) – 59–37 ORL

Attendance: 15,303

- Offensive player of the game: Javarus Dudley (ORL)
- Defensive player of the game: Greg White (ORL)
- Ironman of the game: Marlon Moye-Moore (ORL)

Team	1st Down.	Rush. Yds	Pass. Yds	Fumbles/lost	Fumble yds	Penal./yds	TOP	3rd Down.	4th Down.
TB	23	10	307	3/3	0	10/57	29:36	3/6	1/2
ORL	17	25	188	1/1	57	8/73	30:24	3/5	0/0

=== Week 9: vs Columbus Destroyers ===
	1	2	3	4	Total
CLB	7	6	13	6	32
TAM	7	3	14	10	34

at the St. Pete Times Forum, Tampa, Florida

Scoring summary:

1st Quarter:

- 0:35 TB- T.T. Toliver 29 Yard Pass From John Kaleo (Seth Marler Kick) – 7–0 TB
- 5:18 CLB- Josh Bush 7 Yard Pass From Matt Nagy (Peter Martinez Kick) – 7–7

2nd Quarter:

- 4:31 CLB- Damien Groce 5 Yard Pass From Matt Nagy (Pat Failed) – 13–7 CLB
- 14:53 TB- Seth Marler 23 Yard Field goal – 13–10 CLB

3rd Quarter:

- 2:27 CLB- Damien Groce 39 Yard Pass From Matt Nagy (Peter Martinez Kick) – 20–10 CLB
- 5:22 TB- Terrill Shaw 11 Yard Pass From Brett Dietz (Seth Marler Kick) – 20–17 CLB
- 11:47 TB- Terrill Shaw 27 Yard Pass From Brett Dietz (Seth Marler Kick) – 24–20 TB

4th Quarter:

- 0:41 CLB- B.J. Barre 12 Yard Pass From Matt Nagy (Pat Failed) – 26–21 CLB
- 6:05 TB- Brett Dietz 1 Yard Run (Seth Marler Kick) – 31–26 TB
- 14:04 TB- Seth Marler 20 Yard – 34–26 TB
- 14:33 CLB- Matt Nagy 3 Yard Run (Two-Point Pass Conversion Failed) – 34–32 TB

Attendance: 15,303

- Offensive player of the game: Terrill Shaw (TB)
- Defensive player of the game: Khalid Naziruddin (TB)
- Ironman of the game: Lawrence Samuels (TB)

Team	1st Down.	Rush. Yds	Pass. Yds	Fumbles/lost	Fumble yds	Penal./yds	TOP	3rd Down.	4th Down.
CLB	15	8	204	0/0	0	11/49	22:33	3/6	1/1
TB	20	3	266	0/0	0	12/84	36:27	5/9	0/1

=== Week 10: at Austin Wranglers ===
	1	2	3	4	Total
TAM	10	14	14	28	66
AUS	7	10	14	14	45

at the Frank Erwin Center, Austin, Texas

Scoring summary:

1st Quarter:

- 5:27 TB- Seth Marler 25 Yd Field goal – 3–0 TB
- 9:58 TB- Lawrence Samuels 7 Yd Pass From Brett Dietz (Seth Marler Kick) – 10–0 TB
- 11:50 AUS- Derrick Lewis 44 Yd Pass From Adrian McPherson (Mark Lewis Kick) – 10–7 TB

2nd Quarter:

- 0:07 TB- Lawrence Samuels 17 Yd Pass From Brett Dietz (Seth Marler Kick) – 17–7 TB
- 7:50 AUS- Derrick Lewis 40 Yd Pass From Adrian McPherson (Mark Lewis Kick) – 17–14 TB
- 12:56 TB- Torrance Marshall 2 Yd Run (Seth Marler Kick) – 24–14 TB
- 15:00 AUS- Mark Lewis 18 Yd Field goal – 24–17 TB

3rd Quarter:

- 1:35 TB- Torrance Marshall 2 Yd Run (Seth Marler Kick) – 31–17 TB
- 7:14 AUS- Derrick Lewis 31 Yd Pass From Adrian McPherson (Mark Lewis Kick) – 31–24 TB
- 10:56 TB- Lawrence Samuels 21 Yd Pass From Brett Dietz (Seth Marler Kick) – 38–24 TB
- 11:46 AUS- Sedrick Robinson 57 Yd Kickoff Return (Mark Lewis Kick) – 38–31 TB

4th Quarter:

- 0:03 TB- Torrance Marshall 1 Yd Run (Seth Marler Kick) – 45–31 TB
- 4:26 AUS- Sedrick Robinson 8 Yd Run (Mark Lewis Kick) – 45–38 TB
- 7:30 TB- T.T. Toliver 16 Yd Pass From Brett Dietz (Seth Marler Kick) – 52–38 TB
- 11:39 TB- Jeroid Johnson 28 Yd Interception Return (Seth Marler Kick) – 59–38 TB
- 13:03 AUS- Derrick Lewis 44 Yd Pass From Adrian McPherson (Mark Lewis Kick) – 59–45 TB
- 14:05 TB- Terrill Shaw 9 Yd Pass From Brett Dietz (Seth Marler Kick) – 66–45 TB

Attendance: 13,110

- Offensive player of the game: Brett Dietz (TB)
- Defensive player of the game: Jeroid Johnson (TB)
- Ironman of the game: Lawrence Samuels (TB)

Team	1st Down.	Rush. Yds	Pass. Yds	Fumbles/lost	Fumble yds	Penal./yds	TOP	3rd Down.	4th Down.
TB	23	16	286	1/0	0	11/55	33:29	2/4	0/1
AUS	13	9	288	0/0	0	6/41	26:31	1/9	4/7

=== Week 11: at Los Angeles Avengers ===
	1	2	3	4	Total
TAM	10	7	3	20	40
LA	7	16	7	7	37

at the Staples Center, Los Angeles

Scoring summary:

1st Quarter:

- 4:30 TB- Seth Marler 23 Yard Field Goal – 3–0 TB
- 6:13 LA- Rob Turner 28 Yard Pass From Sonny Cumbie (Remy Hamilton Kick) – 7–3 LA
- 11:13 TB- Lawrence Samuels 6 Yard Pass From Brett Dietz (Seth Marler Kick) – 10–7 TB

2nd Quarter:

- 0:04 LA- Remy Hamilton 35 Yard Field Goal – 10–10
- 7:06 LA- Terrence Stubbs 5 Yard Pass From Sonny Cumbie (Pat Failed) – 16–10 LA
- 10:41 TB- Tom Kaleita 12 Yard Pass From Brett Dietz (Seth Marler Kick) – 17–16 TB
- 14:12 LA- Kevin Ingram 34 Yard Pass From Sonny Cumbie (Remy Hamilton Kick) – 23–17 LA

3rd Quarter:

- 5:30 TB- Seth Marler 36 Yd Field Goal – 23–20 LA
- 14:35 LA- Lonnie Ford 2 Yd Run (Remy Hamilton Kick) – 30–20 LA

4th Quarter:

- 2:29 TB- Terrill Shaw 4 Yd Pass From Brett Dietz (Seth Marler Kick) – 30–27 LA
- 3:34 LA- Robert Quiroga 6 Yd Pass From Sonny Cumbie (Remy Hamilton Kick) – 37–27 LA
- 7:22 TB- T.T. Toliver 14 Yd Pass From Brett Dietz (Seth Marler Kick) – 37–34 LA
- 14:19 TB- T.T. Toliver 2 Yd Pass From Brett Dietz (Pat Failed) – 40–37 TB

Attendance: 12,439

- Offensive player of the game: Kevin Ingram (LA)
- Defensive player of the game: Jeroid Johnson (CLB)
- Ironman of the game: T.T. Toliver (TB)

Team	1st Down.	Rush. Yds	Pass. Yds	Fumbles/lost	Fumble yds	Penal./yds	TOP	3rd Down.	4th Down.
TB	15	5	224	0/0	0	16/78	27:37	2/8	2/2
LA	17	6	197	0/0	0	3/24	32:23	3/9	3/4

=== Week 12: vs Arizona Rattlers ===
	1	2	3	4	Total
ARI	14	20	9	7	50
TAM	10	28	14	7	59

at the St. Pete Times Forum, Tampa, Florida

Scoring summary:

1st Quarter:

- 4:29 TB- Seth Marler 24 Yard Field goal – 3–0 TB
- 8:12 ARI- Trandon Harvey 9 Yard Pass From Sherdrick Bonner (Clay Rush Kick) – 7–3 ARI
- 10:08 TB- Terrill Shaw 8 Yard Pass From Brett Dietz (Seth Marler Kick) – 10–7 TB
- 10:53 ARI- Trandon Harvey 45 Yard Pass From Sherdrick Bonner (Clay Rush Kick) – 14–10 ARI

2nd Quarter:

- 1:55 TB- T.T. Toliver 27 Yard Pass From Brett Dietz (Seth Marler Kick) – 17–14 TB
- 5:16 TB- T.T. Toliver 18 Yard Pass From Brett Dietz (Seth Marler Kick) – 24–14 TB
- 8:28 ARI- Jeremiah Pope 3 Yard Pass From Sherdrick Bonner (Clay Rush Kick) – 24–21 TB
- 11:04 ARI- Atnaf Harris 37 Yard Pass From Sherdrick Bonner (Pat Failed) – 27–24 ARI
- 12:28 TB- Terrill Shaw 17 Yard Pass From Brett Dietz (Seth Marler Kick) – 31–27 TB
- 14:17 ARI- Jeremiah Pope 40 Yard Pass From Sherdrick Bonner (Clay Rush Kick) – 34–31 ARI
- 14:47 TB- T.T. Toliver 5 Yard Pass From Brett Dietz (Seth Marler Kick) – 38–34 TB

3rd Quarter:

- 2:35 ARI- Clay Rush 26 Yard Field goal – 38–37 TB
- 5:59 TB- Lawrence Samuels 8 Yard Pass From Brett Dietz (Seth Marler Kick) – 45–37 TB
- 10:34 ARI- Atnaf Harris 22 Yard Pass From Sherdrick Bonner (Pat Failed) – 45–43 TB
- 13:19 TB- Lawrence Samuels 34 Yard Pass From Brett Dietz (Seth Marler Kick) – 52–43 TB

4th Quarter:

- 0:05 ARI- Jeremiah Pope 23 Yard Pass From Sherdrick Bonner (Clay Rush Kick) – 52–50 TB
- 2:53 TB- Terrill Shaw 23 Yard Pass From Brett Dietz (Seth Marler Kick) – 59–50 TB

Attendance: 16,044

- Offensive player of the game: Brett Dietz (TB)
- Defensive player of the game: Tim McGill (TB)
- Ironman of the game: Lawrence Samuels (TB)

Team	1st Down.	Rush. Yds	Pass. Yds	Fumbles/lost	Fumble yds	Penal./yds	TOP	3rd Down.	4th Down.
ARI	17	6	352	1/0	0	7/75	31:25	3/8	2/3
TB	21	3	337	0/0	0	5/28	28:35	1/3	0/0

=== Week 13: at Georgia Force ===
	1	2	3	4	Total
TAM	3	14	14	7	38
GEO	7	17	7	21	52

at Philips Arena, Atlanta

Scoring summary:

1st Quarter:

- 11:17 TB- Seth Marler 35 Yard – 3–0 TB
- 13:29 GEO- Chris Greisen 1 Yard Run (Carlos Martínez Kick) – 7–3 GEO

2nd Quarter:

- 0:35 GEO- Troy Bergeron 13 Yard Pass From Chris Greisen (Carlos Martínez Kick) – 14–3 GEO
- 5:59 TB- Terrill Shaw 6 Yard Pass From Brett Dietz (Seth Marler Kick) – 14–10 GEO
- 11:33 GEO- Matt Huebner 3 Yard Pass From Jarrick Hillery (Carlos Martínez Kick) – 21–10 GEO
- 14:35 TB- Terrill Shaw 14 Yard Pass From Brett Dietz (Seth Marler Kick) – 21–17 GEO
- 15:00 GEO- Carlos Martínez 38 Yard – 24–17 GEO

3rd Quarter:

- 2:40 TB- Torrance Marshall 5 Yd Run (Seth Marler Kick) – 24–24
- 8:14 TB- Brett Dietz 1 Yd Run (Seth Marler Kick) – 31–24 TB
- 10:39 GEO- Chris Jackson 23 Yd Pass From Willie Gray (Carlos Martínez Kick) – 31–31

4th Quarter:

- 3:46 TB- Lawrence Samuels 5 Yd Pass From Brett Dietz (Seth Marler Kick) – 38–31 TB
- 5:22 GEO- Chris Jackson 26 Yd Pass From Chris Greisen (Carlos Martínez Kick) – 38–38
- 11:46 GEO- Chris Jackson 19 Yd Pass From Chris Greisen (Carlos Martínez Kick) – 45–38 GEO
- 13:12 GEO- Jermaine Smith 14 Yd Interception Return (Carlos Martínez Kick) – 52–38 GEO

Attendance: 10,749

- Offensive player of the game: Chris Jackson (GEO)
- Defensive player of the game: Jermaine Smith (GEO)
- Ironman of the game: Reggie Doster (GEO)

Team	1st Down.	Rush. Yds	Pass. Yds	Fumbles/lost	Fumble yds	Penal./yds	TOP	3rd Down.	4th Down.
TB	23	14	222	0/0	0	11/58	32:26	6/8	1/1
GEO	23	2	296	1/1	0	12/76	27:34	3/4	0/0

=== Week 14: at New Orleans VooDoo ===
	1	2	3	4	Total
TAM	20	14	14	13	61
NO	14	0	14	27	55

at New Orleans Arena, New Orleans

Scoring summary:

1st Quarter:

- 1:02 TB- Terrill Shaw 22 Yard Pass From Brett Dietz (Pat Failed) – 6–0 TB
- 4:25 NO- Tyronne Jones 14 Yard Pass From Steve Bellisari (Jonathan Ruffin Kick) – 7–6 NO
- 6:41 TB- Hank Edwards 29 Yard Pass From Brett Dietz (Seth Marler Kick) – 13–7 TB
- 10:24 NO- Tyronne Jones 10 Yard Pass From Steve Bellisari (Jonathan Ruffin Kick) – 14–13 NO
- 13:14 TB- Terrill Shaw 30 Yard Pass From Brett Dietz (Seth Marler Kick) – 20–14 TB

2nd Quarter:

- 8:52 TB- Hank Edwards 7 Yard Pass From Brett Dietz (Seth Marler Kick) – 27–14 TB
- 14:45 TB- Terrill Shaw 8 Yard Pass From Brett Dietz (Seth Marler Kick) – 34–14 TB

3rd Quarter:

- 2:54 NO- Chris Berg Recovered Fumble In End Zone (Jonathan Ruffin Kick) – 34–21 TB
- 4:14 TB- Lawrence Samuels 6 Yard Pass From Brett Dietz (Seth Marler Kick) – 41–21 TB
- 8:07 NO- James Lynch 1 Yard Run (Jonathan Ruffin Kick) – 41–28 TB
- 12:27 TB- Terrill Shaw 27 Yard Pass From Brett Dietz (Seth Marler Kick) – 48–28 TB

4th Quarter:

- 0:45 NO- Tyronne Jones 5 Yard Pass From Steve Bellisari (Jonathan Ruffin Kick) – 48–35 TB
- 6:12 TB- Seth Marler 17 Yard Field goal – 51–35 TB
- 6:12 NO- Wendall Williams 10 Yard Pass From Steve Bellisari (Two-Point Pass Conversion Failed) – 51–41 TB
- 10:04 TB- Hank Edwards 12 Yard Pass From Brett Dietz (Seth Marler Kick) – 58–41 TB
- 13:38 NO- Wendall Williams 4 Yard Pass From Steve Bellisari (Jonathan Ruffin Kick) – 58–48 TB
- 14:35 NO- Wendall Williams 4 Yard Pass From Steve Bellisari (Jonathan Ruffin Kick) – 58–55 TB
- 14:55 TB- Seth Marler 25 Yard Field goal – 61–55 TB

Attendance: 16,821

- Offensive player of the game: Brett Dietz (TB)
- Defensive player of the game: Jeroid Johnson (TB)
- Ironman of the game: Lawrence Samuels (TB)

Team	1st Down.	Rush. Yds	Pass. Yds	Fumbles/lost	Fumble yds	Penal./yds	TOP	3rd Down.	4th Down.
TB	22	5	315	1/1	0	9/47	32:47	0/3	0/0
NO	29	3	364	2/0	0	5/32	27:13	1/5	1/2

=== Week 15: vs Philadelphia Soul ===
	1	2	3	4	Total
PHI	14	13	12	20	59
TAM	20	14	7	28	69

at the St. Pete Times Forum, Tampa, Florida

Scoring summary:

1st Quarter:

- 0:14 TB- Karl Williams 55 Yard Kickoff Return (Pat Failed) – 6–0 TB
- 5:00 PHI- Idris Price 3 Yard Run (Todd France Kick) – 7–6 PHI
- 6:10 TB- Terrill Shaw 47 Yard Pass From Brett Dietz (Seth Marler Kick) – 13–7 TB
- 8:27 PHI- Larry Brackins 13 Yard Pass From Tony Graziani (Todd France Kick) – 14–13 PHI
- 14:44 TB- Hank Edwards 6 Yard Pass From Brett Dietz (Seth Marler Kick) – 20–14 TB

2nd Quarter:

- 2:46 PHI- J.J. Mckelvey 8 Yard Pass From Tony Graziani (Todd France Kick) – 21–20 PHI
- 8:51 TB- Lawrence Samuels 10 Yard Pass From Brett Dietz (Seth Marler Kick) – 27–21 TB
- 14:07 PHI- Todd France 52 Yard Field goal – 27–24 TB
- 14:45 TB- Hank Edwards 6 Yard Pass From Brett Dietz (Seth Marler Kick) – 34–24 TB
- 15:00 PHI- Todd France 31 Yard Field goal – 34–27 TB

3rd Quarter:

- 0:35 PHI- Larry Brackins 14 Yard Pass From Tony Graziani (Pat Failed) – 34–33 TB
- 4:38 TB- Marvin Brown 23 Yard Run (Seth Marler Kick) – 41–33 TB
- 11:12 PHI- Larry Brackins 3 Yard Pass From Tony Graziani (Pat Blocked) – 41–39 TB

4th Quarter:

- 3:52 TB- Lincoln Kennedy 4 Yard Fumble Return (Seth Marler Kick) – 48–39 TB
- 5:20 PHI- Larry Brackins 25 Yard Pass From Tony Graziani (Todd France Kick) – 48–46 TB
- 8:26 TB- Hank Edwards 20 Yard Pass From Brett Dietz (Seth Marler Kick) – 55–46 TB
- 9:42 PHI- Charles Pauley 15 Yard Pass From Tony Graziani (Todd France Kick) – 55–53 TB
- 12:49 TB- Lawrence Samuels 35 Yard Pass From Brett Dietz (Seth Marler Kick) – 62–53 TB
- 14:23 PHI- Larry Brackins 12 Yard Pass From Tony Graziani (Pat Failed) – 62–59 TB
- 14:35 TB- Terrill Shaw 9 Yard Pass From Brett Dietz (Seth Marler Kick) – 68–59 TB

Attendance: 17,654

- Offensive player of the game: Larry Brackins (TB)
- Defensive player of the game: Traco Rachal (TB)
- Ironman of the game: Lincoln Kennedy (TB)

Team	1st Down.	Rush. Yds	Pass. Yds	Fumbles/lost	Fumble yds	Penal./yds	TOP	3rd Down.	4th Down.
PHI	22	17	298	1/1	0	13/77	27:22	1/3	1/1
TB	21	23	276	0/0	4	3/45	32:38	7/10	1/1

=== Week 16: at Grand Rapids Rampage ===
	1	2	3	4	Total
TAM	17	21	3	28	69
GR	7	27	6	0	40

at Van Andel Arena, Grand Rapids, Michigan

In a sloppy game that saw 11 turnovers, an AFL record.

Scoring summary:

1st Quarter:

- 0:05 TB- Jeroid Johnson 5 Yard Fumble Return (Seth Marler Kick) – 7–0 TB
- 3:28 TB- Seth Marler – 41 Yard – 10–0 TB
- 7:56 GR- Cornelius Bonner 7 Yard Pass From Adrian McPherson (Brian Gowins Kick) – 10–7 TB
- 10:56 TB- Hank Edwards 4 Yard Pass From Brett Dietz (Seth Marler Kick) – 17–7 TB

2nd Quarter:

- 0:06 GR- Adrian McPherson 10 Yard Run (Brian Gowins Kick) – 17–14 TB
- 4:50 TB- Tim McGill Recovered Fumble In End Zone (Seth Marler Kick) – 24–14 TB
- 8:38 TB- Torrance Marshall 1 Yard Run (Seth Marler Kick) – 31–14 TB
- 11:41 GR- Chris Ryan 1 Yard Run (Pat Failed) – 31–20 TB
- 13:20 GR- Jerome Riley 37 Yard Fumble Return (Brian Gowins Kick) – 31–27 TB
- 14:33 TB- Marvin Brown 20 Yard Pass From Brett Dietz (Seth Marler Kick) – 38–27 TB
- 14:50 GR- Cornelius Bonner 43 Yard Pass From Adrian McPherson (Brian Gowins Kick) – 38–34 TB

3rd Quarter:

- 6:22 TB- Seth Marler 32 Yard – 41–34 TB
- 11:33 GR- Clarence Coleman 28 Yard Pass From Adrian McPherson (Pat Failed) – 41–40 TB

4th Quarter:

- 0:06 TB- Torrance Marshall 4 Yard Run (Seth Marler Kick) – 48–40 TB
- 6:32 TB- Karl Williams 18 Yard Pass From Brett Dietz (Seth Marler Kick) – 55–40 TB
- 11:50 TB- Terrill Shaw 7 Yard Pass From Brett Dietz (Seth Marler Kick) – 62–40 TB
- 14:15 TB- Torrance Marshall 7 Yard Run (Seth Marler Kick) – 69–40 TB

Attendance: 6,115

- Offensive player of the game: Brett Dietz (TB)
- Defensive player of the game: Tim McGill (TB)
- Ironman of the game: Jeroid Johnson (TB)

Team	1st Down.	Rush. Yds	Pass. Yds	Fumbles/lost	Fumble yds	Penal./yds	TOP	3rd Down.	4th Down.
TB	18	12	272	3/3	7	4/34	29:30	5/8	0/0
GR	18	56	297	5/5	37	9/53	30:30	3/7	2/3

=== Week 17: vs Austin Wranglers ===
	1	2	3	4	Total
AUS	0	20	14	17	51
TAM	10	15	3	27	55

at the St. Pete Times Forum, Tampa, Florida

Scoring summary:

1st Quarter:

- 5:22 TB- Seth Marler 36 Yard Field goal – 3–0 TB
- 10:16 TB- Karl Williams 39 Yard Pass from Brett Dietz (Seth Marler Kick) – 10–0 TB

2nd Quarter:

- 0:46 AUS- Derrick Lewis 16 Yard Pass From Lang Campbell (Mark Lewis Kick) – 10–7 TB
- 10:37 AUS- Otis Amey 1 Yard Run (Pat Blocked) – 13–10 AUS
- 10:37 TB- Jeroid Johnson 16 Yard Off A Blocked Extra Point – 13–12 AUS
- 12:10 TB- Terrill Shaw 40 Yard Pass From Brett Dietz (Pat Failed) – 18–16 TB
- 14:08 AUS- Sedrick Robinson 46 Yard Pass From Lang Campbell (Mark Lewis Kick) – 20–18 AUS
- 14:48 TB- Torrance Marshall 2 Yard Run (Seth Marler Kick) – 25–20 TB

3rd Quarter:

- 7:42 AUS- Derrick Lewis 5 Yard Pass From Lang Campbell (Mark Lewis Kick) – 27–25 AUS
- 12:00 TB- Seth Marler 36 Yard Field goal – 28–27 TB
- 14:13 AUS- Kevin Nickerson 8 Yard Pass From Lang Campbell (Mark Lewis Kick) – 34–28 AUS

4th Quarter:

- 1:40 TB- Terrill Shaw 9 Yard Pass From Brett Dietz (Pat Failed) – 34–34
- 7:26 AUS- Derrick Lewis 8 Yard Pass From Lang Campbell (Mark Lewis Kick) – 41–34 AUS
- 9:59 TB- Lawrence Samuels 6 Yard Pass From Brett Dietz (Seth Marler Kick) – 41–41
- 13:26 AUS- Otis Amey 10 Yard Pass From Lang Campbell (Mark Lewis Kick) – 48–41 AUS
- 14:09 TB- Terrill Shaw 4 Yard Pass From Brett Dietz (Seth Marler Kick) – 48–48
- 14:30 AUS- Mark Lewis 24 Yard – 51–48 AUS
- 14:52 TB- Torrance Marshall 1 Yd Run (Seth Marler Kick) – 55–51 TB

Attendance: 18,244

- Offensive player of the game: Terrill Shaw (TB)
- Defensive player of the game: Jeroid Johnson (TB)
- Ironman of the game: Sedrick Robinson (AUS)

Team	1st Down.	Rush. Yds	Pass. Yds	Fumbles/lost	Fumble yds	Penal./yds	TOP	3rd Down.	4th Down.
AUS	24	4	340	0/0	0	9/79	35:42	3/7	2/3
TB	16	19	262	2/2	0	10/51	24:18	0/5	2/2

== Playoffs ==
=== Week 1: vs (6) Columbus Destroyers ===
	1	2	3	4	Total
(6) CLB	14	21	7	14	56
(3) TAM	14	21	7	13	55

at the St. Pete Times Forum, Tampa, Florida

The Storm entered the playoffs for the first time since 2005, and coming off an 8–1 stretch that earned them a home-field berth, they faced the team that they won their first game in the stretch against, the Columbus Destroyers. In a game that was back-and-forth scoring, the key play was a missed extra point by Storm kicker Seth Marler with 1:06 left in the game. Following a delay-of-game penalty, Marler missed an extra point attempt that, had he made it, would have given the Storm a 56–49 lead. After Columbus got the ball on the ensuing kickoff, they drove down to the Storm 1-yard line with 10 seconds left. Columbus QB Matt Nagy called his own number and sneaked into the Storm endzone with 7.9 left in the game, and, after the extra point attempt, the Destroyers had a 56–55 lead and looked to pull off the upset. With 3 seconds left and at their own 10-yard line, Marler tried to make amends by attempting a field goal that, if good, would give the Storm a 58–56 win and a game against division rival Georgia. Marler's kick looked good to begin with, but curved off to the left and missed, giving Columbus the upset win and abruptly ending the Storm's season.

Scoring summary:

1st Quarter:

- 1:41 TB- Terrill Shaw 9 Yard Pass From Brett Dietz (Seth Marler Kick) – 7–0 TB
- 4:10 CLB- Damien Groce 29 Yard Pass From Matt Nagy (Peter Martinez Kick) – 7–7
- 9:14 TB- Terrill Shaw 9 Yard Pass From Brett Dietz (Seth Marler Kick) – 14–7 TB
- 10:52 CLB- Harold Wells 11 Yard Pass From Matt Nagy (Peter Martinez Kick) – 14–14

2nd Quarter:

- 1:40 CLB- B.J. Barre 50 Yard Interception Return (Peter Martinez Kick) – 21–14 CLB
- 6:11 TB- Brett Dietz 2 Yard Run (Seth Marler Kick) – 21–21
- 10:53 CLB- Marcus Knight 23 Yard Pass From Matt Nagy (Peter Martinez Kick) 28–21 CLB
- 12:43 TB- Lawrence Samuels 18 Yard Pass From Brett Dietz (Seth Marler Kick) – 28–28
- 14:34 CLB- B.J. Barre 2 Yard Run (Peter Martinez Kick) – 35–28 CLB
- 14:41 TB- Terrill Shaw 2 Yard Pass From Brett Dietz (Seth Marler Kick) 35–35

3rd Quarter:

- 11:15 TB- Torrance Marshall 1 Yard Run (Seth Marler Kick) – 42–35 TB
- 13:04 CLB- Damien Groce 30 Yard Pass From Matt Nagy (Peter Martinez Kick) – 42–42

4th Quarter:

- 3:42 TB- Terrill Shaw 8 Yard Pass From Brett Dietz (Seth Marler Kick) – 49–42 TB
- 7:47 CLB- David Saunders 3 Yard Pass From Matt Nagy (Peter Martinez Kick) – 49–49
- 13:09 TB- Hank Edwards 17 Yard Pass From Brett Dietz (Pat Failed) – 55–49 TB
- 14:53 CLB- Matt Nagy 1 Yard Run (Peter Martinez Kick) – 56–55 CLB

Attendance: 10,221

- Offensive player of the game: Terrill Shaw (TB)
- Defensive player of the game: B.J. Barre (CLB)
- Ironman of the game: Lawrence Samuels (TB)

Team	1st Down.	Rush. Yds	Pass. Yds	Fumbles/lost	Fumble yds	Penal./yds	TOP	3rd Down.	4th Down.
CLB	20	22	260	0/0	0	12/63	19:27	4/6	1/2
TB	29	14	315	0/0	0	11/63	40:33	3/5	1/1

== Notes ==
- For scoring summaries, weeks 1–6 are from arenafootball.com, and weeks 7–17 and playoffs are from espn.com. All awards and game-comparison statistics are from arenafan.com
