= Brett Dietz =

American football player and coach (born 1981)

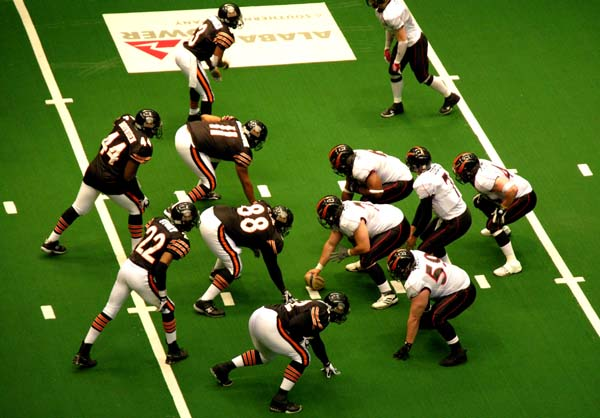
- Dietz under center in 2006

DePauw Tigers
- Title: Head coach

Personal information
- Born: October 8, 1981 (age 45); Villa Hills, Kentucky, U.S.
- Listed height: 6 ft 4 in (1.93 m)
- Listed weight: 220 lb (100 kg)

Career information
- Position: Quarterback
- High school: Covington Catholic (Park Hills, Kentucky)
- College: Hanover
- NFL draft: 2003: undrafted

Career history

Playing
- Turku Trojans (2004); Cincinnati Marshals (2005); Tampa Bay Storm (2006)*; Louisville Fire (2006); Chicago Rush (2007)*; Spokane Shock (2007)*; Kansas City Brigade (2007)*; Tampa Bay Storm (2007–2008); California Redwoods (2009)*; Tampa Bay Storm (2010)
- * Offseason or practice squad member only

Coaching
- Cascade HS (IN) (2006) Quarterbacks coach; Marian (IN) (2007) Defensive backs coach; DePauw (2010) Wide receivers coach; DePauw (2011–2013) Quarterbacks & wide receivers coach; DePauw (2014–2019) Offensive coordinator; DePauw (2020–present) Head coach

Awards and highlights
- 2× First-team All-HCAC (2002–2003); af2 Rookie of the Year (2006); AFL Co-Rookie of the Year (2007); AFL All-Rookie Team (2007); Second-team All-Arena (2010)

Career AFL statistics
- Passing yards: 11,994
- TD–INT: 240–35
- Passer rating: 119.96
- Rushing yards: 57
- Rushing touchdowns: 6
- Stats at ArenaFan.com

Head coaching record
- Regular season: 48–4 (.923)
- Postseason: 3–5 (.375)
- Career: 51–9 (.850)

Brett Dietz (born October 8, 1981) is an American college football coach and former quarterback. He is the head football coach for DePauw University, a position he has held since 2020. Dietz played college football at Hanover College in Hanover, Indiana and professionally with several teams including the Turku Trojans in Finland Vaahteraliiga and in Arena Football League (AFL), Af2, and the National Indoor Football League (NIFL) for the Cincinnati Marshals, Louisville Fire, Tampa Bay Storm and California Redwoods.

== Early life ==
Dietz played high school football at Covington Catholic High School in Park Hills, Kentucky. He was inducted into the school's Hall of Fame in 2020. He then attended Hanover College becoming the starter his junior and senior seasons. In 2002, he led the team to an undefeated regular season before falling to Wittenburg in the first round of the playoffs. He threw for 2,296 yards on 182 completions on 309 attempts with 26 touchdowns and 13 interceptions, also added two rushing touchdowns. He was tabbed first-team all-Heartland Conference. His senior season, Dietz again led the Panthers to a playoff berth after leading the team to a 8–3 record and another conference title. In the first round playoff loss to Baldwin-Wallace, Dietz set a Division III playoff record for completions and attempts after going 46–78 for 520 yards and 4 TDs and 4 INTs. He was once again a first team all-Heartland Conference selection and set school records for completions and attempts going 314–497 for 3,511 yards with 35 TDs and 12 INTs.

Dietz also played basketball, baseball, and golf at Hanover.

== Professional playing career ==
Dietz is the only player in AFL and af2 history to win "rookie of the year" in back-to-back seasons (2006 with Louisville Fire (af2), 2007 with Tampa Bay Storm (AFL)).

=== Turku Trojans ===
Dietz began his career in 2004 playing for the Turku Trojans in Finland Vaahteraliiga. He led the Trojans to the top-ranked pass offense, while guiding the team to the Maple Bowl championship game before losing to the Helsinki Roosters.

=== Cincinnati Marshals ===
In 2005, Dietz played with the Cincinnati Marshals of the National Indoor Football League (NIFL).

=== Louisville Fire ===
Dietz attended training camp with the Tampa Bay Storm and was assigned to the practice squad on January 27. After spending six weeks on practice squad, he was released on March 9 to join the af2's Louisville Fire. He spent the remainder of 2006 with Fire as starting quarterback and was named af2 Spalding Rookie of the Year and first-team American Conference All-af2. Set af2 single-game high with 12 touchdown passes 6/17/06 at Albany, where he completed 23 of 31 passes for 314 yards. He led af2 in completion percentage (71.2%) and pass efficiency (126.7).

=== Tampa Bay Storm ===
Dietz became starting quarterback in 2007 after both John Kaleo and Stoney Case were injured . He propelled them to an 8–1 record and led them to the playoffs after a 1–6 start, although they lost 56–55 in his first playoff game. However, for his efforts during the season, Dietz was named co-rookie of the year in the league. After the Arena Football League returned for the 2010 season, Dietz returned with the Storm. He led them to a 13–6 record, but the team was defeated in ArenaBowl XXIII by the Spokane Shock.

=== California Redwoods ===
Dietz was drafted by the California Redwoods of the United Football League in the UFL Premiere Season Draft in 2009. He signed with the team on August 18. He was released on September 23.

=== Statistics ===
AFL statistics
Year	Team	Completions	Pass attempts	Passing yards	Passing TDs	Passing INTs	Rushing yards	Rushing TDs
2007	Tampa Bay Storm	196	300	2,374	47	7	9	2
	Career (AFL)	196	300	2,374	47	7	9	2

== Coaching career ==
Dietz was the quarterbacks coach for Cascade High School in Clayton, Indiana for the 2006 season.

Dietz was announced as the head coach of DePauw on January 2, 2020. Dietz has coached at the school since 2010 as a position coach and was the offensive coordinator the previous six seasons. He coached his team to 2–0 record in his first season during the COVID-19 shortened season.

== Head coaching record ==
Year	Team	Overall	Conference	Standing	Bowl/playoffs	D3^{#}	AFCA^{°}
DePauw Tigers (North Coast Athletic Conference) (2020–present)
2020–21	DePauw	2–0	0–0	N/A			
2021	DePauw	9–3	8–1	1st	L NCAA Division III Second Round		
2022	DePauw	9–2	7–1	1st	L NCAA Division III First Round		
2023	DePauw	10–1	8–0	1st	L NCAA Division III First Round		21
2024	DePauw	11–1	8–0	1st	L NCAA Division III Third Round	9	8
2025	DePauw	10–2	7–1	2nd	L NCAA Division III Third Round	14	13
2026	DePauw	0–0	0–0				
DePauw:		51–9	38–3				
Total:		51–9					
National championship Conference title Conference division title or championship game berth
