= Brian Gowins =

American football player (born 1976)

No. 11, 13
- Position: Placekicker

Personal information
- Born: June 3, 1976 (age 50); Birmingham, Alabama, U.S.
- Listed height: 5 ft 10 in (1.78 m)
- Listed weight: 174 lb (79 kg)

Career information
- High school: Shades Valley (Irondale, Alabama)
- College: Northwestern (1994–1998)

Career history
- Detroit Lions (1999)*; Chicago Bears (1999); Grand Rapids Rampage (2000–2003); Carolina Panthers (2000)*; Philadelphia Soul (2004); Los Angeles Avengers (2004); Las Vegas Gladiators (2004); Orlando Predators (2005); Grand Rapids Rampage (2007–2008)
- * Offseason or practice squad member only

Awards and highlights
- ArenaBowl champion (2001); Second-team All-Arena (2001); AFL Kicker of the Year (2001); AFL All-Rookie Team (2000); First-team All-Big Ten (1997)
- Stats at Pro Football Reference
- Stats at ArenaFan.com

Brian Gowins (born June 3, 1976) is an American former professional football player who was a placekicker for eight seasons in the Arena Football League (AFL) with the Grand Rapids Rampage, Las Vegas Gladiators, and Orlando Predators. He played college football at Northwestern University and was named first-team All-Big Ten as a junior in 1997. He signed with the Detroit Lions in 1999 after going undrafted. Gowins later played in two games for the Chicago Bears of the National Football League (NFL) in 1999. He then played in the AFL from 2000 to 2008, primarily with the Grand Rapids Rampage. In 2000, he was named to the AFL All-Rookie Team after setting the league's single-season rookie record for field goals. In 2001, he earned AFL Kicker of the Year and second-team All-Arena honors while helping Grand Rapids win ArenaBowl XV.

== Early life ==
Brian Gowins was born on June 3, 1976, in Birmingham, Alabama. He played high school football at Shades Valley High School in Irondale, Alabama, and earned first-team all-state honors his senior year in 1993. He was also an all-state soccer player growing up.

== College career ==
Gowins was a four-year letterman for the Northwestern Wildcats of Northwestern University from 1995 to 1998 after redshirting in 1994. He converted 12 of 13 extra points and three of six field goals his redshirt freshman year in 1995. On October 5, 1996, Gowins kicked a field goal with 13 seconds left in the game to help No. 22 ranked Northwestern beat No. 6 ranked Michigan by a score of 17–16. He made 30 of 32 extra points and 16 of 24 field goals overall in 1996 while leading the Big Ten Conference in field goal attempts for the season. In 1997, he converted 19 of 22 extra points and 20 of 27 field goal attempts. Gowins led the Big Ten that year in field goals made and field goals attempted, earning second-team All-Big Ten Conference from the coaches and first-team All-Big Ten from the media. As a senior in 1998, he made 21 of 21 extra points and 17 of 24 field goals. He graduated with a degree in economics.

== Professional career ==
After going undrafted in the 1999 NFL draft, Gowins signed with the Detroit Lions on April 23. He was released on August 18, 1999, after the first preseason game due to the Lions already having long-time kicker Jason Hanson.

Gowins was signed by the Chicago Bears on August 26, 1999. He was released on August 31 and signed to the team's practice squad on September 6. He was moved to the active roster on September 11, one day before the start of the 1999 NFL season. Gowins began the 1999 season as the Bears' placekicker due to Jeff Jaeger having suffered a hip injury. Gowins made both extra points and both field goals he attempted during the Bears' 20–17 win over the Kansas City Chiefs in Week 1. He was moved back to the practice squad after the game but promoted back to the active roster again in time for the Week 2 game against the Seattle Seahawks. Against the Seahawks, he converted his only extra point attempt while making two of four field goals. He missed a potential game-winning 48-yard field goal with 13 seconds left in the game as the Bears lost by a score of 14–13. He was moved back to the practice squad again after the game and was later released by the Bears on September 28, 1999.

Gowins played in all 14 games for the Grand Rapids Rampage of the Arena Football League (AFL) during the 2000 AFL season, totaling 61 of 71 extra points, 25 of 44 field goals, two solo tackles, and one assisted tackle. He was also invited to tryouts with the New York Giants and Green Bay Packers midway through the season but did not miss any AFL playing time as a result. The Rampage finished the season with a 6–8 record and lost in the first round of the playoffs to the Nashville Kats. Gowins was named to the AFL All-Rookie Team for his performance during the 2000 season. His 25 field goals set an AFL rookie record.

Afterwards, Gowins signed with the Carolina Panthers on August 14, 2000, after Panthers kicker John Kasay broke his kneecap. Gowins played in one preseason game for the Panthers, but was released on August 20, 2000.

He re-signed with the Rampage on December 13, 2000. He was placed on the refused to report list on March 19, 2001. Gowins was later activated and appeared in all 14 games for the Rampages for the second consecutive season, making 97 of 101 extra points and 15 of 26 field goals while also posting seven solo tackles, three assisted tackles, and one fumble recovery. The Rampage finished the year with an 11–3 record and advanced to the playoffs, where they eventually beat the Nashville Kats in ArenaBowl XV. Gowins also earned AFL Kicker of the Year and second-team All-Arena honors that season. He re-signed with the team on February 21, 2002. He was placed on the refused to report list on March 24 and was activated on April 2, 2002. In June 2002, after three straight games in which Gowins had trouble with reaching the net on kickoffs, Rampage head coach Michael Trigg stated "Maybe it's time we bring in another kicker to provide some competition to Gowins". Nevertheless, Gowins played in all 14 games for the third straight season in 2002, recording 81 of 94 extra points, four of 14 field goals, seven solo tackles, four assisted tackles, and one fumble recovery. The Rampage finished the season with an 8–6 record before losing in the first round of the postseason to the Carolina Cobras. Gowins was re-signed by the Rampage on December 5, 2002. He was placed on the refused to report list again on January 7, 2003, and was activated on January 11, 2003. He appeared in all 16 games during the 2003 season, converting 91 of 107 extra points and 12 of 24 field goals while also recording nine solo tackles, six assisted tackles, and one incomplete pass. The team finished 8–8 and lost in the first round of the playoffs to the Detroit Fury.

Gowins was signed by the AFL's Philadelphia Soul on October 27, 2003. He was placed on injured reserve on January 31, 2004.

On February 25, 2004, he was traded to the Los Angeles Avengers for Mike Ulufale. Gowins was then traded to the Las Vegas Gladiators for Jeroid Johnson that same day. Gowins re-signed with the Gladiators on February 27, 2004. He was placed on emergency hold on April 4 and later activated the next day. He re-signed with the Gladiators again on May 5, 2004. Overall, he played in 12 games for the Gladiators during the 2004 season, making 72 of 82 extra points and seven of 11 field goals while also recording three solo tackles and three assisted tackles. The Gladiators finished the season with an 8–8 record, missing the playoffs.

After the 2004 season, Gowins had a two-day tryout with the Rampage but was unable to beat out kicker Peter Martinez. Gowins signed with the Orlando Predators of the AFL on February 8, 2005, after the team cut Steve McLaughlin following the second game of the season. He appeared in 12 games in 2005, totaling 66 of 80 extra points, 11 of 19 field goals, three solo tackles, and one fumble recovery. The Predators finished the year with a 10–6 record and lost in the semifinals to the Georgia Force.

After a one-year hiatus due to injury, Gowins signed a one-year contract with the Rampage on October 19, 2006. He played in all 16 games for the team in 2007, converting 92 of 106 extra points and 15 of 30 field goals while also making three solo tackles and four assisted tackles. The Rampage finished the season with a 4–12 record. He re-signed with the team on February 23, 2008. He made 119 of 126 extra points and ten of 17 field goals while also posting ten solo tackles and six assisted tackles for the Rampage that season. The Rampage finished the year with a 6–10 record but ended up advancing to the third round of the playoffs, where they lost to the San Jose SaberCats by a score of 81–55. Both the Rampage and the AFL folded after the 2008 season. Gowins finished his AFL career as the Rampage's all-time leading scorer. In 2014, the 2001 Grand Rapids Rampage were inducted into the Grand Rapids Sports Hall of Fame.

== Personal life ==
Gowins ran Leading Edge Realty in Grand Rapids after his AFL career. He missed a field goal in the 2012 film Red Dawn as part of a high school football scene. He later became a kickers coach for the Davenport Panthers of Davenport University.
