= Seth Marler =

American football player (born 1981)

No. 6
- Position: Placekicker

Personal information
- Born: March 27, 1981 (age 45); Atlanta, Georgia, U.S.
- Listed height: 6 ft 1 in (1.85 m)
- Listed weight: 195 lb (88 kg)

Career information
- High school: Parkview (Lilburn, Georgia)
- College: Tulane (1999–2002)
- NFL draft: 2003: undrafted

Career history
- Jacksonville Jaguars (2003–2005); Atlanta Falcons (2006)*; Jacksonville Jaguars (2006)*; Tampa Bay Storm (2007–2008)
- * Offseason or practice squad member only

Awards and highlights
- Lou Groza Award (2001); First-team All-American (2001); C-USA Special Teams Player of the Year (2001); 2× Second-team All-C-USA (1999, 2001)

Career NFL statistics
- Field goals made: 20
- Field goals attempted: 33
- Field goal percentage: 60.6%
- Longest field goal: 53
- Extra points made: 30
- Extra points attempted: 30
- Extra point percentage: 100%
- Points scored: 90
- Stats at Pro Football Reference

Career AFL statistics
- Field goals made: 27
- Field goals attempted: 38
- Field goal percentage: 71%
- Extra points made: 204
- Extra points attempted: 224
- Stats at ArenaFan.com

Michael Seth Marler (born March 27, 1981) is an American former professional football player who was a placekicker in the National Football League (NFL) and Arena Football League (AFL). He played college football for the Tulane Green Wave. He was signed by the Jacksonville Jaguars as an undrafted free agent in 2003.

== Early life ==
Marler attended Parkview High School in Lilburn, Georgia, and was a good student and a standout in football and soccer. In football, he was a three-year letterman. In soccer, he played Defender and Midfielder. It was here that he gained the nickname, Lilburn leg.

== College career ==
Marler attended Tulane University and was a double major in Marketing and Management and was a letterman in football. In football, as a freshman, he was named to the All-Conference USA Freshman Team, was a Second-team All-Conference USA selection, and was a semi-finalist for the Lou Groza Award. As a sophomore, he was a Second-team All-Louisiana selection and was a semi-finalist for the Lou Groza Award. He led his team in points and ranked second in Conference USA for points with 85. As a junior, He was named to the Conference USA Commissioner's Honor Roll, was selected as an All-American. Playing against East Carolina, he kicked a 53-yard field goal which was the longest field goal he kicked in his college football career. As a senior, he also decided to accept punting duties and was named Second-team All-Louisiana as a Kicker and as a Punter, and was named as a Second-team All-Conference USA selection as a punter. During his senior year, he was also twice named the Conference USA Player of the Week and won the 2001 Lou Groza Award. He also scored a school record of 333 points for his career.

== Professional career ==
=== Jacksonville Jaguars (first stint) ===
Marler went unselected in the 2003 NFL draft, however he signed as an undrafted free agent with the Jacksonville Jaguars. As a rookie he made 60.6% of his field goal attempts. He was cut during the 2004 Jaguars training camp after losing his starting position to Josh Scobee. He was again re-signed in 2005, but was later released during the preseason.

=== Atlanta Falcons ===
Marler was signed by the Atlanta Falcons on May 3, 2006 but was waived on May 16, 2006.

=== Jacksonville Jaguars (second stint) ===
He re-signed with the Jaguars on August 11, 2006 but was waived on August 28, 2006.

=== Tampa Bay Storm ===
On March 16, 2007, Marler signed with the Tampa Bay Storm of the Arena Football League (AFL). As a rookie in the AFL, he made 16-of-20 field goal attempts and 92-of-99 PAT attempts, as well as recording two tackles. In 2008, he made 11-of-18 field goal attempts and 112-of-125 PAT attempts, as well as recording eight tackles.

== See also ==
- List of Arena Football League and National Football League players
