= Eisenhower High School (Houston) =

Dwight D. Eisenhower High School
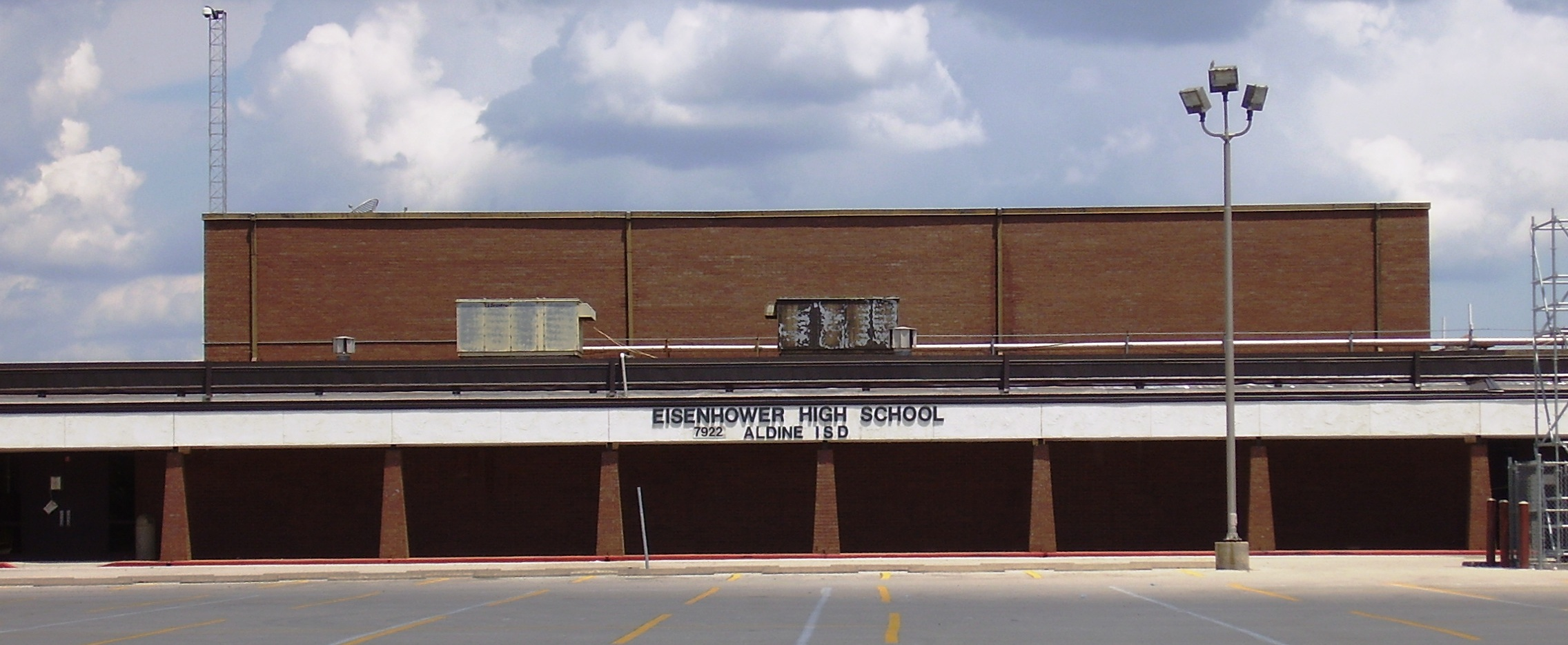

Location
- 7922 Antoine Drive; Houston, Texas 77088; United States; 29.8818°N 95.4723°W

Information
- Established: 1972
- School district: Aldine ISD
- Principal: James Metcalf, Darnell Ross (for 9th grade)
- Teaching staff: 163.24 FTE
- Grades: 9–12
- Enrollment: 2,483 (2023–2024)
- Student to teacher ratio: 15.21
- Colors: Black & gold
- Slogan: "SWOOP SWOOP"
- Mascot: Eagle
- Rival: Davis High School
- Website: eisenhowerhs.aldineisd.org

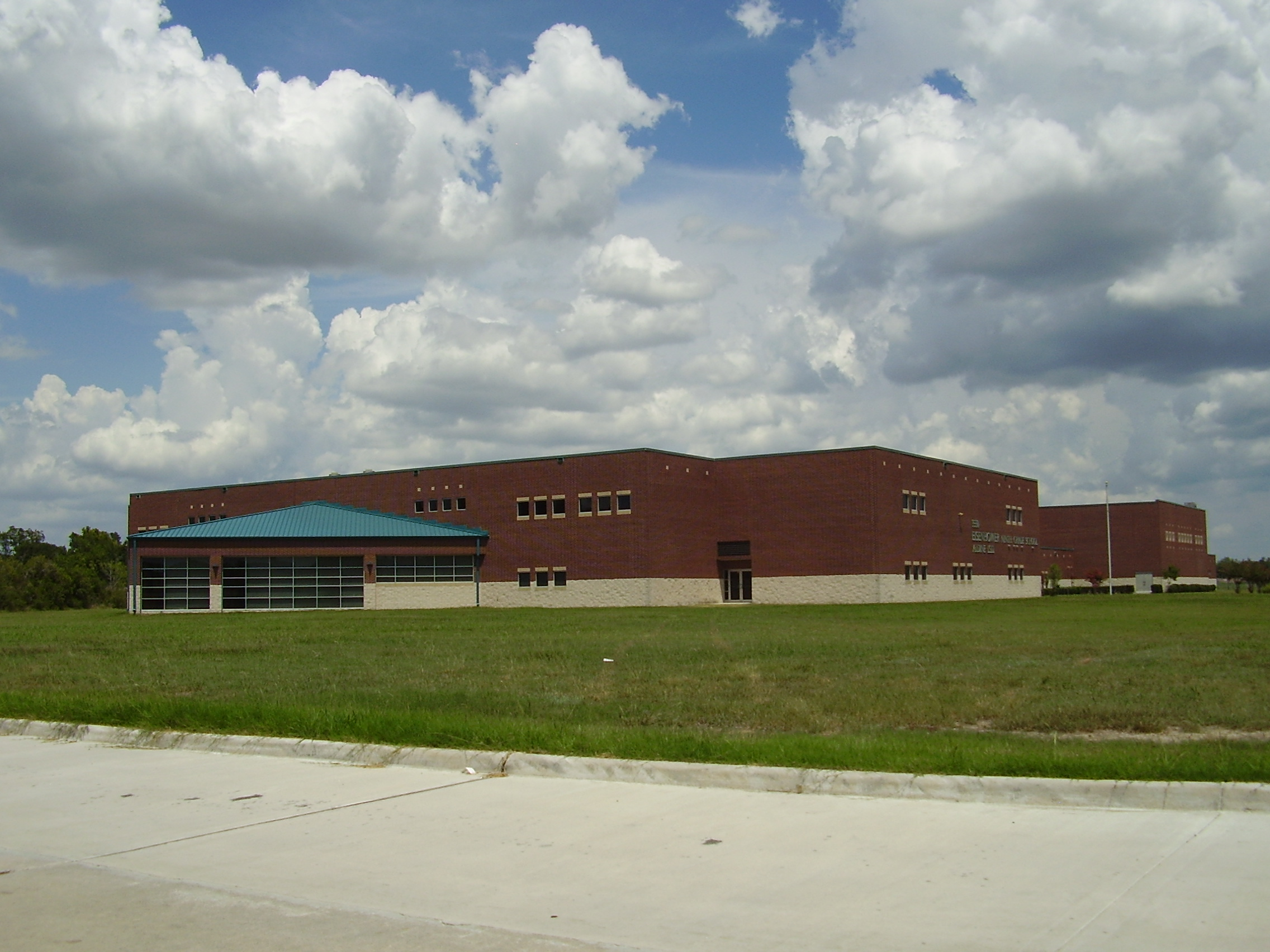
Eisenhower 9th Grade School

Dwight D. Eisenhower High School is a Title I public secondary school located in Near Northwest and in Houston, Texas, United States.

Eisenhower is a part of the Aldine Independent School District. The main campus is located at 7922 Antoine Drive, while the Eisenhower 9th Grade School is located at 3550 West Gulfbank Road.

Eisenhower serves multiple areas. The Inwood Forest community, and the western portion of the Acres Homes community are served by Eisenhower. In addition, the unincorporated Harris County communities of Bammel Trace, Mount Royal Village, Parkland Place, Greensfield Village, Willow Springs Villas, Woodland Trails and Woodgate Village are zoned to Eisenhower.

Eisenhower offers Advanced Placement courses, including World History, Calculus (AB and BC), Macroeconomics, Statistics, U.S. Government and Politics, English, Spanish, French, US History, Visual Arts, and Psychology. Eisenhower also offers the International Baccalaureate Programme with courses including Higher Level English, Higher Level Spanish, Standard Level Spanish, Standard Level French, Higher Level History of the Americas, Standard Level Chemistry, Standard Level Physics, Higher Level Biology, Standard Level Mathematical Studies, Standard Level Mathematics, Higher Level Visual Arts, Higher Level Music, In the past, Eisenhower sent at least two projects each year to the National History Day competition in Washington D.C., while having a top-tiered Academic Decathlon team that has progressed to the state competition three years in a row. In 1991, 1998 and 2009 the school hosted Texas French Symposium.

The school is nicknamed "Big Ike" and "Ike," after Dwight D. Eisenhower's nickname.

The school was named a National Blue Ribbon School in 1988–1989.

== History ==
Eisenhower High School opened in 1972. When it first opened, it was Jr/Sr high school going from the 7th-12th grade. Eisenhower was the first desegregated senior high school in the Aldine Independent School District.

Eisenhower 9th Grade School opened in 1999, relieving Eisenhower High School.

== Academics ==
For each school year, the Texas Education Agency rates school performance using an A–F grading system based on statistical data. For 2018–2019, the school received a score of 77 out of 100, resulting in a C grade. The school received a score of 69 the previous year.

== Demographics ==
In the 2022–2023 school year, there were 2,855 students. The ethnic distribution of students was:

- 23.8% African American
- 1.2% Asian
- 72.4% Hispanic
- 0.3% American Indian
- 1.4% White
- 0.9% two or more races

82.7% of students were eligible for free or reduced-price lunch. The school was eligible for Title I funding.

== Feeder pattern ==
EC PK/K schools that feed into Eisenhower High school include:

- Kujawa EC PK/K Center
- Reece EC PK/K Center
- Stovall EC PK/K Center
- Vines EC PK/K Center

Elementary schools that feed into Eisenhower High School include:

- Anderson Academy (partial)
- Bethune Academy (partial)
- Carmichael Elementary
- Carter Academy
- Conley Elementary
- Ermel Elementary
- Harris Academy
- Kujawa Elementary
- Sammons Elementary
- Smith Elementary
- Caraway Elementary
- Hill Elementary
- Houston Academy (partial)
- Wilson Elementary

Middle schools that feed into Eisenhower High School include:

- Drew Academy (partial)
- Garcia Middle School
- Hoffman Middle School (partial)
- Plummer Middle School (partial)
- Shotwell Middle School (partial)

== Partnership ==
In 2016, YES Prep Eisenhower opened inside the campus. It served grades 9 to 12 starting in the 2019-2020 school year. These students take their core classes at YES Prep, but they participate in extracurricular activities with Eisenhower. This is how YES Prep and Aldine work together. In 2022, Aldine ISD announced that the dissolve-meant partnership between the district and YES Prep public schools and replacing both programs at Hoffman and Eisenhower to college prep schools.

== Notable alumni ==
- Jaelon Darden, American football player
- Fred Miller, American football player
- Ryan Niblett, college football wide receiver for the Texas Longhorns
- Jarrod Penright, American football player
- Henry Thomas, Pro Bowl defensive tackle in the NFL, mostly with Minnesota Vikings, in late 1980s and 1990s.
- Slim Thug, American rapper
- Amanda Edwards, Houston City Council Woman
