= T. T. Toliver =

American football player (born 1977)

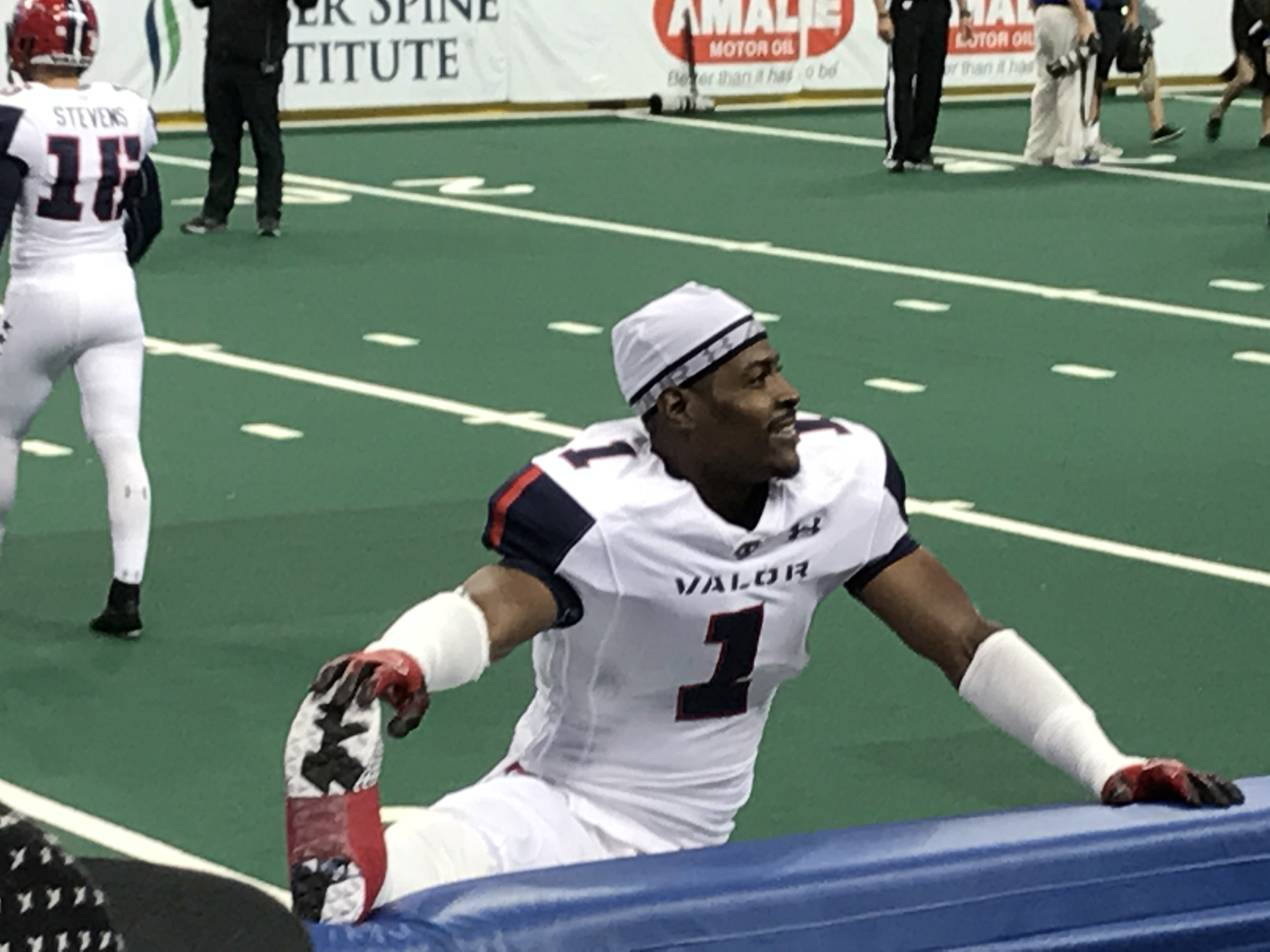
- Toliver with the Washington Valor in 2017

No. 18, 17, 1
- Position: Wide receiver

Personal information
- Born: January 31, 1977 (age 49); Daytona Beach, Florida U.S.
- Listed height: 5 ft 11 in (1.80 m)
- Listed weight: 185 lb (84 kg)

Career information
- High school: Mainland (Daytona Beach)
- College: Hinds (1996–1997); Bethune-Cookman (basketball)
- NFL draft: 2000: undrafted

Career history
- Toronto Argonauts (1998)*; St. Louis Rams (2000–2001)*; Tampa Bay Storm (2002–2005); San Francisco 49ers (2002)*; Tampa Bay Buccaneers (2002)*; Nashville Kats (2005–2006); Tampa Bay Storm (2007); Orlando Predators (2007–2013); Tampa Bay Storm (2014–2016); Washington Valor (2017–2018)
- * Offseason or practice squad member only

Awards and highlights
- Super Bowl champion (XXXVII); 2× ArenaBowl champion (2003, 2018); First-team All-Arena (2008); Second-team All-Arena (2016); AFL All-Ironman Team (2004)

Career AFL statistics
- Receptions: 1,258
- Receiving yards: 16,488
- Touchdowns: 320
- Kick return yards: 5,379
- Kick return touchdowns: 13
- Stats at ArenaFan.com

Antoine "T. T." Toliver (born January 31, 1977) is an American former professional football wide receiver who played in the Arena Football League (AFL) from 2002 to 2018. He played football and basketball at Mainland High School in Daytona Beach, Florida. In 1995, he was named the Class 5A Player of the Year in football and was also runner-up for Florida's Mr. Football Award. In basketball, Toliver helped Mainland win the Class 6A state championship in 1995 and 1996. He played college football and basketball at Hinds Community College, where he was named the 1997 Junior College Player of the Year as a quarterback. He lost his college football eligibility after signing with the Toronto Argonauts of the Canadian Football League in 1998. Toliver later enrolled at Bethune-Cookman University, where he played basketball.

From 2000 to 2002, Toliver spent time on the practice squads of the St. Louis Rams, San Francisco 49ers and Tampa Bay Buccaneers of the National Football League. He was part of the Buccaneers team that won Super Bowl XXXVII in January 2003. He played for the Tampa Bay Storm of the AFL from 2002 to 2005. In 2003, he was part of the Storm team that won ArenaBowl XVII, becoming the first person to win an ArenaBowl and Super Bowl in the same year. Toliver later played for the AFL's Nashville Kats from 2005 to 2006, the Storm in 2007, the Orlando Predators from 2007 to 2013, the Storm from 2014 to 2016 and the Valor from 2017 to 2018. He was named first-team All-Arena in 2008 and second-team All-Arena in 2016. He is the AFL's all-time leader in receptions, receiving yards and all-purpose yards.

== Early life ==
Toliver played football and basketball at Mainland High School in Daytona Beach, Florida. He completed 130 of 219 passes for 1,959 yards and 16 touchdowns with 10 interceptions while rushing for 1,098 yards and 15 touchdowns in helping the Buccaneers advance to the Class 5A quarterfinals in 1995. He was named the 1995 Class 5A Player of the Year. Toliver was runner-up for Florida's Mr. Football Award. He also participated in the Florida-Georgia All-Star Game. In basketball, he helped Mainland win the Class 6A state championship in 1995. Toliver was the team's point guard and averaged 12.4 points per game that year. NBA player Vince Carter was also a member of that team. Toliver was also the leading scorer on the 1996 team that won the state championship.

== College career ==
Toliver had initially committed to play college football for the Clemson Tigers in 1996 but did not meet the NCAA's academic admission standards. He instead decided to play football for the Hinds Eagles of Hinds Community College from 1996 to 1997, where he was named the 1997 Junior College Player of the Year as a quarterback. He also earned first-team Junior College All-American honors in 1997. Toliver also played basketball for the Eagles.

He lost his college football eligibility after signing with the Toronto Argonauts of the Canadian Football League in spring 1998. He did not make the team. In August 1998, it was reported that Toliver was trying to get enough credits to transfer to a four-year school. He later enrolled at Bethune-Cookman University, where he played for the Wildcats basketball team during the 1999–00 season. He averaged 6.8 points per game in 25 games for the Wildcats. Toliver did not play football at Bethune-Cookman due to having lost his football eligibility.

== Professional career ==
Toliver spent a week on the St. Louis Rams' practice squad in November 2000 before being was released by the Rams on November 22, 2000. He signed with the Rams on January 12, 2001. He was released by the team on August 27, 2001.

Toliver signed with the Tampa Bay Storm on June 13, 2002. He recorded 30 solo tackles, 19 tackle assists and 2 interceptions in 5 games for the Storm in 2002.

He was signed by the San Francisco 49ers on August 21, 2002. He was released by the team on September 1 and signed to the 49ers' practice squad on September 2, 2002. He was released by the 49ers again on October 1, 2002.

Toliver was signed to the Tampa Bay Buccaneers's practice squad on December 4, 2002. The Buccaneers won Super Bowl XXXVII against the Oakland Raiders on January 26, 2003. He signed a future contract with the Buccaneers on January 31, 2003. He was released by the Buccaneers on April 22, 2003. Toliver did not receive a Super Bowl ring during his time with the Buccaneers as the team said that players needed to have been with the team for a minimum of 10 games to receive a ring. He was with the team for four regular season games and three playoff games.

After being released by the Buccaneers, he was activated from the Storm's exempt list and re-signed by the Storm in April 2003. He accumulated 8 receptions for 126 yards and 2 touchdowns while also recording 12 solo tackles in 2003. Toliver became the first person to win an ArenaBowl and Super Bowl in the same year when the Storm won ArenaBowl XVII against the Arizona Rattlers on June 22, 2003. He caught 64 passes for 749 yards and 14 touchdowns while also totaling 50 solo tackles, 9 tackle assists and 3 interceptions in 2004. He was named to the All-Ironman Team in 2004. (Note: The AFL's annual All-Ironman Team was composed of players who excelled on both offense and defense.) Toliver recorded 17 receptions for 169 yards and 5 touchdowns with 4 solo tackles, 1 tackle assist and 1 interception for the team in 2005.

He was traded to the Nashville Kats in exchange for Fred Booker on March 30, 2005. He totaled 38 receptions for 599 yards and 12 touchdowns with 9 solo tackles and 2 tackle assists for the Kats during the 2005 season. Toliver caught 78 passes for 1,273 yards and 28 touchdowns for the team in 2006.

He was traded to the Storm in exchange for future considerations on November 29, 2006. He recorded 99 receptions for 1,193 yards and 17 touchdowns for the Storm in 2007. On May 30, 2007, Toliver informed head coach Tim Marcum that he no longer wanted to play for the Storm. He was subsequently placed on the "left squad" list, meaning he was suspended for the next two games he would have played as a Storm player. Toliver was released by the Storm on June 12, 2007.

Toliver signed with the Orlando Predators on June 13, 2007. He accumulated 20 receptions for 190 yards and 4 touchdowns for the Predators in 2007. He caught 117 passes for 1,647 yards and 31 touchdowns in 2008, earning first-team All-Arena honors. Toliver also returned 78 kicks for 1,398 yards and 3 touchdowns. He totaled 116 receptions for 1,423 yards and 29 touchdowns for the Predators during the 2010 season. He was named the Russell Athletic Offensive Player of the Week for Week 20 of the 2010 season for setting the AFL record for receiving touchdowns in a playoff game with seven touchdowns. He played in 16 games, starting 15, in 2011 and recorded 121 receptions for 1,525 yards and 32 touchdowns. Toliver played in 16 games, starting 15, in 2012 and caught 103 passes for 1,290 yards and 23 touchdowns. He played in 14 games, starting 13, in 2013 and accumulated 127 passes for 1,659 yards and 29 touchdowns.

Toliver was assigned to the Storm on April 9, 2014. He played in 12 games, starting 10, during the 2014 season and recorded 69 receptions for 812 yards and 16 touchdowns. He started all 18 games for the Storm in 2015, catching 112 passes for 1,536 yards and 35 touchdowns. Toliver earned Cutter's Catch of the Week honors for Week 3 of the 2015 season for catching his 1,000th career pass, becoming only the fourth player in AFL history to do so. He started all 16 games for the Storm in 2016, catching 114 passes for 1,578 yards and 25 touchdowns, earning second-team All-Arena honors. He also caught 3 passes for 51 yards and 2 touchdowns in the Storm's playoff loss to the Philadelphia Soul on August 7. Toliver earned AFL Highlight of the Week honors in Week 9 for an over-the-shoulder game-winning touchdown catch, with three seconds left in the game after the catch. He again earned Highlight of the Week accolades in Week 11 for becoming the league's all-time leader in receiving yards. During the 2016 season, he became the AFL's all-time leader in receptions, receiving yards and all-purpose yards. Toliver also became the first player in AFL history to record 5,000 receiving yards and 400 receptions with two different teams, which he accomplished with both the Predators and Storm. He also joined Chris Jackson as the second player in league history to total 100 receiving touchdowns with two different teams.

Toliver was assigned to the Washington Valor on January 11, 2017. On June 1, 2017, he was placed on injured reserve. On June 29, 2017, he was reactivated from injured reserve. Toliver was named the Week 16 Offensive Player of the Week after catching 6 passes for 113 yards and 3 touchdowns in a 34–30 win against the Baltimore Brigade. He also caught the eventual game-winning touchdown, with only four seconds remaining in the game after his catch. He played in 10 games, starting 8, in 2017, catching 38 passes for 524 yards and 12 touchdowns. As of August 2017, Toliver was the oldest player in the AFL. He was placed on reassignment on June 28, 2018. He was assigned to the Valor on July 5, 2018. He played in 11 games in 2018, catching 17 passes for 195 yards and 6 touchdowns. On July 28, 2018, the Valor won ArenaBowl XXXI against the Baltimore Brigade. Toliver retired after the 2018 season.

=== Receiving statistics ===
Year	Team	Rec	Yds	TDs
2003	TAM	8	126	2
2004	TAM	64	749	14
2005	TAM	17	169	5
2005	NSH	38	599	12
2006	NSH	78	1,273	28
2007	TAM	99	1,193	17
2007	ORL	20	191	4
2008	ORL	117	1,647	31
2010	ORL	116	1,423	29
2011	ORL	121	1,525	32
2012	ORL	103	1,290	23
2013	ORL	127	1,659	29
2014	TAM	69	812	16
2015	TAM	112	1,536	35
2016	TAM	114	1,578	25
2017	WAS	38	524	12
2018	WAS	17	195	6
Career		1,258	16,488	320

== Coaching career ==
Toliver became the wide receivers coach at Matanzas High School in Palm Coast, Florida in 2021.

== Personal life ==
Toliver's mother nicknamed him "T. T." for 'Toine Toliver.
