= Jarrod Penright =

American football player (born 1980)

Profile
- Position: Linebacker

Personal information
- Born: December 17, 1980 (age 45)
- Listed height: 6 ft 2 in (1.88 m)
- Listed weight: 238 lb (108 kg)

Career information
- High school: Houston (TX) Eisenhower
- College: Texas A&M
- NFL draft: 2003: undrafted

Career history
- Minnesota Vikings (2003)*; Indiana Firebirds (2004); Tampa Bay Storm (2005–2006)
- * Offseason or practice squad member only

Awards and highlights
- First-team All-Big 12 (2002); Second-team All-Big 12 (2003)
- Stats at ArenaFan.com

Jarrod Penright (born December 17, 1980) is an American former professional football player who played in the Arena Football League (AFL) for the Indiana Firebirds and Tampa Bay Storm. He played college football for the Texas A&M Aggies. He had a short career in the National Football League (NFL) prior to joining the AFL.

== Early life ==
Penright attended Eisenhower High School where he was selected as the Defensive Player of the Year by the Houston Chronicle after accumulating 66 solo tackles and 12 quarterback sacks.

== College career ==
During his time at Texas A&M, he was part of the Wrecking Crew defensive team. He started his first game with the Aggies in 2000. He started every game in 2001 and led the team in sacks and tackles for a loss. He was involved in a car accident during the summer of 2002 which caused him to miss practice due to headaches.

His junior year, he was first-team all-conference for the Big 12. That season, he totaled 66 tackles, 19 tackles for a loss and 10.5 sacks. His senior year, he was selected to the second-team all-conference for the Big 12. He posted 50 tackles, 15.5 tackles for a loss and 9.5 sacks.

== Professional career ==
Penright went undrafted in the 2003 NFL draft. In August 2003, the Minnesota Vikings signed him as a free agent on the same day that they waived Jeff Kostrewa. He was later released during roster cuts on August 25, 2003.

Penright joined the AFL in 2004 and played with the Indiana Firebirds. During the 2004 season, he had 114 yards on 25 carries and scored three touchdowns. He also had 13.5 tackles, eight solo tackles, a forced fumble and a fumble recovery.

In 2005, he signed a multi-year contract with the team to play linebacker and fullback. In 2005, he appeared in six games and had 20 carries for 53 yards and four touchdowns. He finished the season ranked 2nd on the team in yards per carry with 2.7. He also played linebacker for the team in 2005 where he recorded three solo tackles, three assisted tackles and a blocked kick.
