= Jay Taylor (placekicker) =

American football player (born 1976)

No. 6
- Position: Placekicker

Personal information
- Born: October 23, 1976 (age 50); Hershey, Pennsylvania, U.S.
- Listed height: 6 ft 0 in (1.83 m)
- Listed weight: 191 lb (87 kg)

Career information
- High school: Hershey (PA)
- College: West Virginia
- NFL draft: 2000: undrafted

Career history
- Miami Dolphins (2000)*; Orlando Rage (2001); Buffalo Bills (2001)*; Seattle Seahawks (2002)*; Cleveland Browns (2002)*; Rhein Fire (2003); Cleveland Browns (2003)*; Orlando Predators (2004); Tampa Bay Buccaneers (2004); Orlando Predators (2005); Tennessee Titans (2005)*; Orlando Predators (2006–2007)
- * Offseason or practice squad member only

Awards and highlights
- First-team All-Arena (2004); AFL Kicker of the Year (2004)
- Stats at Pro Football Reference
- Stats at ArenaFan.com

James Taylor (born October 23, 1976) is an American former professional football player who was a kicker in the Arena Football League (AFL) and the National Football League (NFL). He played collegiately for the West Virginia Mountaineers.

== Early life ==
Taylor attended Hershey High School in Hershey, Pennsylvania and starred in football, soccer, and tennis. In football, he was an All-Conference selection.

== College career ==
Taylor attended West Virginia University and was a student and a four-year letterman in football. Taylor played both kicker and punter in his four-year career from 1996 to 1999.

In his sophomore season in 1997, Taylor kicked a career-long 52-yard field goal against Pittsburgh in the Backyard Brawl.

Against Ohio State, as a junior in 1998, Taylor punted for a career-high 410 yards. Against Virginia Tech that same season, Taylor had a career-long 63-yard punt.

== Professional career ==
=== Miami Dolphins ===
Jay Taylor was signed as an undrafted free agent by the Miami Dolphins in 2000. Taylor was cut shortly afterwards.

=== Orlando Rage ===
He was selected by the Orlando Rage of the XFL in the 2001 XFL draft, where he played both kicker and punter.

=== Buffalo Bills ===
After the XFL season ended, the Buffalo Bills signed him to the preseason roster, primarily as a punter. He lost the competition to Brian Moorman and was waived during the preseason.

=== Rhein Fire ===
In 2003, he played for the Rhein Fire of NFL Europe, allocated from the Cleveland Browns.

=== Tampa Bay Buccaneers ===
Starting the season on the team's practice squad, the Tampa Bay Buccaneers activated Taylor to play 5 games in 2004.

=== Orlando Predators ===
After being cut by the Tampa Bay Buccaneers in 2005, Taylor was signed by the Orlando Predators of the Arena Football League on June 30, 2006.

Taylor entered the 2008 season as the franchise leader in single-season field goal percentage, career field goal percentage, single-season extra point percentage, career extra point percentage, consecutive extra points made, and consecutive field goals made. He also won the 2004 Kicker of the Year award with the Predators.
