= Rod Williams (lineman) =

American football player (born 1973)

No. 52, 50
- Position: Offensive lineman/Defensive lineman

Personal information
- Born: January 15, 1973 (age 53)
- Listed height: 6 ft 3 in (1.91 m)
- Listed weight: 300 lb (136 kg)

Career information
- College: Florida A&M

Career history
- Tampa Bay Storm (1999–2007)

Awards and highlights
- ArenaBowl champion (2003); Second-team All-Arena (2001); 2× First-team All-MEAC (1993, 1995)
- Stats at ArenaFan.com

Rod Williams (born January 15, 1973) is an American former professional football offensive/defensive lineman who played for the Tampa Bay Storm of the Arena Football League (AFL) from 1999 to 2007. He was named second-team All-Arena in 2001.
