= ArenaBowl XV =

2001 edition of the Arena Football League's championship game

Nashville Kats (#2)	Grand Rapids Rampage (#1)
42	64
	1	2	3	4	Total
NAS	14	7	14	7	42
GR	14	23	14	13	64
- Date: August 19, 2001
- Stadium: Van Andel Arena; Grand Rapids, Michigan
- MVP: Terrill Shaw, OS, Grand Rapids: Demo Odems, WR/DB, Grand Rapids (Ironman of the Game)
- Attendance: 11,217
- Winning coach: Michael Trigg
- Losing coach: Pat Sperduto

TV in the United States
- Network: ABC
- Announcers: Brent Musburger, Gary Danielson, and Lynn Swann

ArenaBowl XV was the 2001 edition of the Arena Football League's championship game, pairing the Grand Rapids Rampage of the Central Division with the Nashville Kats of the Southern Division. The Grand Rapids offense, led by quarterback Clint Dolezel and MVP Terrill Shaw, was able to outmatch the Nashville defense, and Grand Rapids won the game, 64–42.

== Game summary ==
The Grand Rapids Rampage scored an ArenaBowl-record (at the time) 64 points as they sent a sellout crowd home from Van Andel Arena happy with a 64–42 victory over the Nashville Kats to claim their first ArenaBowl title in team history.

Grand Rapids quarterback Clint Dolezel connected with offensive specialist Terrill Shaw for five touchdowns, and threw two others to Demo Odems as the Rampage offense dominated one of the league's marquee defenses.. Shaw caught 12 passes for 172 yards on the day en route to being named the game's MVP, while Nashville's top receiving threat, Cory Fleming was held to just four catches and no receiving touchdowns.

The game marked the first championship for Rampage coach Michael Trigg in his 10-year coaching career, and the first in the history of the organization. Meanwhile, it was the second consecutive ArenaBowl defeat for the Kats, and the last game the team would play before moving to Atlanta to become the Georgia Force. The city of Nashville would be left without AFL football until a reincarnation of the Kats began play in 2005.

== Scoring summary ==
1st Quarter

- GR - T.Shaw 6 pass from Dolezel (Gowins kick)
- NASH - Jones 17 pass from Kelly (McLaughlin kick)
- GR - T.Shaw 6 pass from Dolezel (Gowins kick)
- NASH - Grant 1 run (McLaughlin kick)

2nd Quarter

- GR - T.Shaw 41 pass from Dolezel (Gowins kick)
- GR - Odems 14 pass from Dolezel (Gowins kick failed)
- NASH - Jones 34 pass from Kelly (McLaughlin kick)
- GR - Avery 1 run (Gowins kick)
- GR - FG Gowins 36

3rd Quarter

- NASH - Reece 1 run (McLaughlin kick)
- GR - T.Shaw 31 pass from Dolezel (Gowins kick)
- NASH - Hillery 33 pass from Kelly (McLaughlin kick)
- GR - H.Shaw 1 run (Gowins kick)

4th Quarter

- NASH - Baron 28 pass from Fleming (McLaughlin kick)
- GR - T.Shaw 15 pass from Dolezel (Gowins kick)
- GR - Odems 17 pass from Dolezel (Gowins kick failed)
