= Stoney Case =

American football player (born 1972)

No. 10, 15
- Position: Quarterback

Personal information
- Born: July 7, 1972 (age 54); Odessa, Texas, U.S.
- Listed height: 6 ft 3 in (1.91 m)
- Listed weight: 200 lb (91 kg)

Career information
- High school: Permian (Odessa)
- College: New Mexico
- NFL draft: 1995: 3rd round, 80th overall pick

Career history
- Arizona Cardinals (1995–1998); Indianapolis Colts (1999)*; Baltimore Ravens (1999); Detroit Lions (2000); Tampa Bay Storm (2004–2005); San Jose SaberCats (2006); Tampa Bay Storm (2007–2008)
- * Offseason or practice squad member only

Awards and highlights
- WAC Offensive Player of the Year (1994); Second-team All-WAC (1993)

Career NFL statistics
- Passing attempts: 318
- Passing completions: 163
- Completion percentage: 51.3%
- TD–INT: 4–15
- Passing yards: 1,826
- Passer rating: 53.3
- Rushing yards: 270
- Rushing touchdowns: 5
- Stats at Pro Football Reference

Career AFL statistics
- Comp. / Att.: 53 / 81
- Passing yards: 581
- TD-INT: 9–2
- Passer rating: 103.99
- Rushing TD: 2
- Stats at ArenaFan.com

Stoney Jarrod Case (born July 7, 1972) is an American former professional football player who was a quarterback for three teams in the National Football League (NFL) and three teams in the Arena Football League (AFL). He played college football for the New Mexico Lobos.

== Early life and college ==
Case played high school football for the Odessa Permian Panthers, quarterbacking the team to an undefeated, 16–0 season and the Texas 5A football title in 1989, one year after the events chronicled in the Friday Night Lights book and movie. The Panthers were voted ESPN's National Champion team as a result. During his Permian career, Case also lettered in baseball as an outfielder, first baseman and pitcher. His brother Stormy Case also played quarterback for the Panthers and went on to play for Texas A&M.

Recruited to play college football for the University of New Mexico, Case was a four-year starter for the Lobos and was the first player in NCAA Division I-A (now FBS) history to post 9,000 career passing yards and 1,000 career rushing yards. In the course of his college career he threw or ran for 98 touchdowns, which at the time of his graduation was second in I-A history to Ty Detmer. In 1994, Case was the WAC player of the year and led the NCAA with 33 total TD'S and 3,649 total yards.

- 1991: Threw for 1,564 yards with 10 TD vs 6 INT with 2 rushing TD's.
- 1992: Threw for 2,289 yards with 18 TD vs 13 INT with 4 rushing TD's.
- 1993: Threw for 2,490 yards with 17 TD vs 8 INT with 14 rushing TD's.
- 1994: Threw for 3,117 yards with 22 TD vs 12 INT on 409 pass attempts with 11 rushing TD's.

== Professional career ==
=== NFL ===
Case was a third round pick in the 1995 NFL draft and played quarterback for Arizona Cardinals from 1995 to 1998, though he spent part of that time with the Barcelona Dragons in the NFL Europe. He was signed as a free agent by both the Indianapolis Colts and the Baltimore Ravens in 1999, and went to the Detroit Lions as an unrestricted free agent in 2000.

Case saw limited action during his NFL career. He played in two games during his rookie season, but saw no action in either 1996 or 1998. He played twice in 1997 as a replacement for injured starter Kent Graham. He played in 10 games for the Baltimore Ravens in 1999, starting four games and winning two of them. He also played in five other games later in the season, receiving playing time as a back-up quarterback. In all, Case played in a total of 24 career NFL games over six years, 12 as a starter, in which he passed for 1,826 yards and 4 touchdowns while rushing for 270 yards and 5 touchdowns. His best game came in 1999 against the Atlanta Falcons, Case threw for 2 touchdowns and no interceptions with a QB rating of 96.5.

As an NFL player, Case was criticized by some fans for his uncertainty and lack of ability to throw an effective long pass. His worst career performance came in October 1999 when he appeared for the Ravens against the Kansas City Chiefs, completing only 15 of 37 passes for 103 yards. "The Chiefs", noted the Baltimore City Paper, "by comparison, ran back his intercepted passes for 108 yards. Repeat: 103 yards forward, 108 yards backward. Add in those two touchdowns off interceptions and Case did almost precisely as much for Kansas City as did the Chiefs' own quarterback, Elvis Grbac (112 yards, two TD passes)."

In 2000, Case signed with the Detroit Lions as the primary backup to quarterback Charlie Batch. Appearing in five games, Case passed for 503 yards, 1 touchdown, and 4 interceptions. His best game came on November 30 in a game against the Minnesota Vikings. Even though the Lions lost 24–17, Case filled in for an injured Batch and put up 230 yards on 23–33 passing with a touchdown and an interception.

=== AFL ===
After major shoulder surgery at the end of his contract with Detroit and seemingly out of the NFL, Case subsequently moved to the Arena Football League. In 2004, he was signed by Tampa Bay Storm, playing in just three games in 2005 and completing 4 of 7 passes for 35 yards and 2 touchdowns.

In 2006, Case was the backup to Mark Grieb with the San Jose SaberCats in the AFL American Conference, Western Division. On October 31, he returned to Tampa Bay as a free agent. Four games into the 2007 season, Case took over as the Storm's starting quarterback. However, that was short-lived when he dislocated his shoulder against the Orlando Predators and had season ending surgery.

== See also ==
- List of NCAA major college football yearly total offense leaders
