= Nyle Wiren =

American football player and coach (born 1973)

No. 44
- Position: Defensive lineman

Personal information
- Born: February 8, 1973 (age 53)
- Listed height: 6 ft 2 in (1.88 m)
- Listed weight: 270 lb (122 kg)

Career information
- College: Kansas State
- NFL draft: 1997: undrafted

Career history

Playing
- Tampa Bay Storm (1998–2008)

Coaching
- Tampa Bay Storm (2011) (Asst)

Awards and highlights
- ArenaBowl champion (2003); Second-team All-Arena (2004); First-team All-Big 12 (1996); Second-team All-Big Eight (1994)

Career AFL statistics
- Tackles: 154.5
- Sacks: 14
- Forced fumbles: 10
- Pass breakups: 28
- Interceptions: 4
- Stats at ArenaFan.com

Nyle Wiren (born February 8, 1973) is an American former professional football defensive lineman who played eleven seasons with the Tampa Bay Storm of the Arena Football League (AFL). He played college football at Kansas State University.

== College career ==
Wiren played for the Kansas State Wildcats from 1993 to 1996. He set Kansas State records for most career sacks with 27.5 and most sacks in a season with 11.5 in 1996. He earned All-America honorable mention honors his senior year in 1996.

== Professional career ==
Wiren played for the AFL's Tampa Bay Storm from 1998 to 2008, earning second-team All-Arena honors in 2004. He retired after the 2008 season.

== Coaching career ==
Wiren was an assistant coach for the Tampa Bay Storm in 2011.

== Personal life ==
Wiren was a double for Stone Cold Steve Austin in The Longest Yard.
