= Rodney Filer =

American football player and coach (born 1974)

No. 34
- Position: Fullback

Personal information
- Born: June 14, 1974 (age 52); Houston, Texas, U.S.
- Listed height: 6 ft 3 in (1.91 m)
- Listed weight: 255 lb (116 kg)

Career information
- High school: University (Waco, Texas)
- College: Iowa
- NFL draft: 1997: undrafted

Career history
- San Diego Chargers (1997–1998)*; Iowa Barnstormers (1999–2000); New York Jets (2001)*; New York Dragons (2001–2004); Las Vegas Gladiators (2005–2006); Tampa Bay Storm (2007); Utah Blaze (2008); Iowa Barnstormers (2010–2012)
- * Offseason or practice squad member only

Awards and highlights
- Second-team All-Arena (2003)

Career AFL statistics
- Rushes: 384
- Yards: 1,252
- Touchdowns: 70
- Tackles: 141
- Sacks: 8.5
- Stats at ArenaFan.com

Rodney Allen Filer (born June 14, 1974) is a retired arena football fullback who played in the Arena Football League (AFL) for thirteen seasons. Filer played college football for the University of Iowa. He was signed as an undrafted free agent by the San Diego Chargers of the National Football League (NFL) in 1997. A one-time All-Arena selection, he was a member of the Iowa Barnstormers, New York Dragons, Las Vegas Gladiators, Tampa Bay Storm and Utah Blaze. Filer became the strength and conditioning coach for the Barnstormers in 2015.

== Career rushing statistics ==
| Year | Team | Games | Att | Yards | Avg | TDs |
|---|---|---|---|---|---|---|
| 1999 | Iowa Barnstormers | 14 | 2 | 1 | 0.5 | 0 |
| 2000 | Iowa Barnstormers | 14 | 5 | 14 | 2.8 | 2 |
| 2001 | New York Dragons | 14 | 9 | 19 | 2.1 | 4 |
| 2002 | New York Dragons | 14 | 11 | 21 | 1.9 | 3 |
| 2003 | New York Dragons | 16 | 20 | 87 | 4.4 | 6 |
| 2004 | New York Dragons | 16 | 24 | 84 | 3.5 | 3 |
| 2005 | Las Vegas Gladiators | 16 | 25 | 103 | 4.1 | 3 |
| 2006 | Las Vegas Gladiators | 16 | 27 | 130 | 4.8 | 1 |
| 2007 | Tampa Bay Storm | 16 | 26 | 94 | 3.6 | 9 |
| 2008 | Utah Blaze | 16 | 61 | 205 | 3.4 | 12 |
| 2010 | Iowa Barnstormers | 16 | 51 | 181 | 3.5 | 8 |
| 2011 | Iowa Barnstormers | 18 | 42 | 146 | 3.5 | 4 |
| 2012 | Iowa Barnstormers | 18 | 71 | 167 | 2.4 | 15 |
| Totals | - | 190 | 384 | 1,252 | 3.3 | 70 |

== Career receiving statistics ==
| Year | Team | Games | Rec | Yards | TDs |
|---|---|---|---|---|---|
| 1999 | Iowa Barnstormers | 14 | 2 | 50 | 2 |
| 2000 | Iowa Barnstormers | 14 | 5 | 34 | 1 |
| 2001 | New York Dragons | 14 | 2 | 33 | 0 |
| 2002 | New York Dragons | 14 | 3 | 20 | 0 |
| 2003 | New York Dragons | 16 | 2 | 17 | 0 |
| 2004 | New York Dragons | 16 | 5 | 26 | 0 |
| 2005 | Las Vegas Gladiators | 16 | 12 | 124 | 2 |
| 2006 | Las Vegas Gladiators | 16 | 6 | 45 | 1 |
| 2007 | Tampa Bay Storm | 16 | 3 | 20 | 0 |
| 2008 | Utah Blaze | 16 | 14 | 101 | 2 |
| 2010 | Iowa Barnstormers | 16 | 6 | 35 | 1 |
| 2011 | Iowa Barnstormers | 18 | 3 | 12 | 0 |
| 2012 | Iowa Barnstormers | 18 | 9 | 83 | 1 |
| Totals | - | 190 | 72 | 600 | 10 |
