= Bo Rogers =

American gridiron football player (born 1978)

Ronald "Bo" Rogers
Profile
- Position: Defensive back

Personal information
- Born: July 12, 1978 (age 48); Chicago, Illinois, U.S.
- Listed height: 6 ft 0 in (1.83 m)
- Listed weight: 180 lb (82 kg)

Career information
- College: Western Michigan University

Career history
- 2002: Tampa Bay Storm (AFL)
- 2003: Scottish Claymores (NFLEL)
- 2004: Colorado Crush (AFL)
- 2005: Ottawa Renegades (CFL)

Awards and highlights
- First-team All-MAC (2001); Second-team All-MAC (2000)

Ronald "Bo" Rogers (born July 12, 1978 in Chicago, Illinois) is a former Canadian Football League cornerback, last active in 2005 for the Ottawa Renegades. He previously played in the Arena Football League, NFL Europe, and the practice squad of the New York Giants. Rogers became a free agent after going undrafted in the 2006 Dispersal Draft following the suspension of the Renegades' franchise.

== College career ==
Rogers attended Western Michigan University. He finished his career with 14 interceptions, 214 tackles, 39 pass deflections, a sack, two forced fumbles, and two fumble recoveries, and as a senior, he was an All-America pick and an All-Mid-American Conference selection.
