= Dustin Bell =

American football player (born 1987)

No. 3
- Position: Defensive back

Personal information
- Born: April 18, 1987 (age 39); Dallas, Texas
- Listed height: 5 ft 11 in (1.80 m)
- Listed weight: 180 lb (82 kg)

Career information
- High school: Dallas (TX) Wilmer-Hutchins
- College: UTEP
- NFL draft: 2010: undrafted

Career history
- Tri-Cities Fever (2011); Cleveland Gladiators (2012); New Orleans VooDoo (2013)*; Tri-Cities Fever (2014–2015)
- * Offseason or practice squad member only

Career AFL statistics
- Tackles: 8
- Interceptions: 1
- Stats at ArenaFan.com

Dustin D. Bell (born April 18, 1987) is an American former football defensive back. He played collegiately for UTEP Miners at University of Texas at El Paso. Bell was considered a top shutdown corner coming out of Bakersfield Junior College.

== Early life ==
Bell attended Wilmer-Hutchins High School in Dallas, Texas, where he played football, basketball and baseball. He was All-District in all three sports. As a quarterback his sophomore year he led the eagles to the second round in the playoffs, where they lost a thriller against the Rusk Eagles. During his senior year at Hutch he led the Eagles to the third round in the playoffs. He had record-setting QB statistics; 1770 yards with 27 touchdowns. He was named to the Dallas Morning News' Area Top 100 list and was named a Sleeper in The Dave Campbell Texas Football book and TexPreps.com. He was MVP his senior year. He was a three-star athlete excelling in basketball and in baseball.

== College career ==
After high school, Bell originally signed with University of Texas at El Paso (UTEP) on a football scholarship, but he would end up attending Bakersfield Junior College where he continued his football career. He red-shirted as a freshman in 2005 season. He was considered a contender for starting cornerback his redshirt freshman season. He compiled 70 tackles and 10 interceptions in two years at Bakersfield. In December 2007, Bell committed to Kansas State University to continue his football career.

Upon graduation from Bakersfield, Bell enrolled at UTEP as a Multidisciplinary Studies major. Bell began his senior season as a backup for the Miners.

== Professional career ==
=== Tri-Cities Fever ===
Bell played a big part in the Tri-Cities Fever, of the Indoor Football League, making it to the United Bowl.

=== Cleveland Gladiators ===
In 2012, Bell played for the Cleveland Gladiators of the Arena Football League.

=== New Orleans VooDoo ===
Bell signed with the New Orleans VooDoo for the 2013 season. Bell was reassigned before the season began.

=== Return to Tri-Cities ===
Bell re-signed with the Fever for the 2014 season.
