= Karl Williams =

American football player (born 1971)

No. 86, 6
- Positions: Wide receiver, return specialist

Personal information
- Born: April 10, 1971 (age 55); Albion, Michigan, U.S.
- Listed height: 5 ft 11 in (1.80 m)
- Listed weight: 177 lb (80 kg)

Career information
- High school: Garland (Garland, Texas)
- College: Texas A&M–Kingsville (1992–1995)
- NFL draft: 1996: undrafted

Career history
- Tampa Bay Buccaneers (1996–2003); Arizona Cardinals (2004); Tampa Bay Storm (2007)

Awards and highlights
- Super Bowl champion (XXXVII)

Career NFL statistics
- Receptions: 155
- Receiving yards: 1,897
- Receiving touchdowns: 7
- Return yards: 3,810
- Return touchdowns: 5
- Stats at Pro Football Reference

Karl Williams (born April 10, 1971) is an American former professional football player who was a wide receiver and return specialist in the National Football League (NFL) for the Tampa Bay Buccaneers and Arizona Cardinals. He played college football for the Texas A&M–Kingsville Javelinas and was signed by the Buccaneers as an undrafted free agent after the 1996 NFL draft. Williams retired as the all-time Buccaneers leader in punt return yardage (2,565) and punt return touchdowns (5) across 8 seasons with the club; records that still stand today.

== Professional career ==
Buccaneers head coach Tony Dungy brought him on as an undrafted free agent in 1996. Williams said about these early years in the NFL, "I remember those last phone calls when they were making the final cuts my rookie year. It was me and Jeff Gooch, and we were sitting around waiting for that phone call. We called it the Grim Reaper. Everyone was packing up and getting ready to go home and we were still waiting. Then they came around and said 'Did you get the call? No? Then you're good.' I remember Jeff and I just falling back and saying, 'Yeah!' "

As a rookie he established himself as Tampa Bay's primary return specialist by the end of the season. He earned the NFC's Special Teams Player of the Month award for December that first year in 1996.

Williams parlayed his success as a returner into more reps as a wide receiver. His 1997 campaign was his best ever at wideout; he achieved 486 receiving yards and 4 touchdowns in that role. Williams also continued to be a successful punt returner, and was picked as a candidate to end the Bucs' kickoff-return drought. The team had never returned a kick for a touchdown in its 30-year history. However, the majority of Williams' success concerned return punts and not on kickoffs; and the team would not return a kick until Micheal Spurlock did so in 2007.

Although he was not successful at kickoffs, Williams scored with some regularity as a punt returner, recording one touchdown each in the 1996 and 1997 seasons as well as one each year from 2000 to 2002.

At the end of the 2002 season he achieved the game's highest honor by becoming a Super Bowl champion. A member of the first championship Tampa Bay squad; Williams' Bucs were led by Hall of Famers linebacker Derrick Brooks and defensive tackle Warren Sapp on defense, and game-manager quarterback Brad Johnson on offense. Behind head coach Jon Gruden, the Buccaneers went 12–4 during the regular season, defeated their chief rivals the Philadelphia Eagles in the NFC Championship game, and dominated the Super Bowl against the Oakland Raiders, winning 48–21 to bring the Lombardi Trophy to the Tampa Bay area. Williams did not have a catch in the Super Bowl, but he had a 25 yard punt return that set up Tampa Bay at the Raiders' 27 yard line.

Williams left Tampa Bay after the following season and signed with the Arizona Cardinals, playing one year in the desert before leaving the NFL for good at the end of the 2004 season.

== After football ==
Williams also remains a fan favorite in the Tampa Bay area. Part of the source of his popularity can be found in his nickname, "The Truth". He got his nickname largely because it was the nickname of journeyman boxer of the 1980s and 1990s Carl Williams. He was most famous for going toe-to-toe with some of boxing's best, including Larry Holmes (who Williams lost a controversial decision to) and to Mike Tyson.

Like the boxer, he achieved despite his humble beginnings, his modest college, and his undrafted status to achieve greatness at football's highest level. Williams has earned a Super Bowl ring on his career as a punt returner. He has said "That's being a ballplayer. Everyone talks about me as a punt returner, and they made me a punt returner in my rookie year because that was the only way I could get on the field."

== Personal life ==
His rags to riches story has led to Williams' ownership of a small gym in Texas, where he encourages the youth of his alma mater that everyone can be successful. He is now teaching the determination and willingness to do whatever it takes that he embraced so well as a player. When asked the truth about him, old coach Jon Gruden said about Williams, "He's a humble guy, a guy who's worked for everything he has and that's one of the winning edges he brings to our football team and something I really appreciate about him."
