= Terrill Shaw =

American football player (born 1976)

No. 15, 17
- Position: Wide receiver / Defensive back

Personal information
- Born: February 4, 1976 (age 50); Jackson, Mississippi, U.S.
- Listed height: 6 ft 0 in (1.83 m)
- Listed weight: 190 lb (86 kg)

Career information
- College: Southern Miss

Career history
- Buffalo Destroyers (2000); Grand Rapids Rampage (2001–2003); Kansas City Chiefs (2002)*; Berlin Thunder (2002)*; New Orleans Saints (2003)*; Las Vegas Gladiators (2004); Philadelphia Soul (2004–2005); Dallas Desperados (2005–2006); Tampa Bay Storm (2007–2008)
- * Offseason or practice squad member only

Awards and highlights
- ArenaBowl champion (2001); ArenaBowl MVP (2001)

Career AFL statistics
- Receptions: 577
- Receiving yards: 7,868
- Total TDs: 164
- Stats at ArenaFan.com

Terrill Shaw (born February 4, 1976) is an American former professional football wide receiver who played nine seasons in the Arena Football League (AFL) with the Buffalo Destroyers, Grand Rapids Rampage, Las Vegas Gladiators, Philadelphia Soul, Dallas Desperados and Tampa Bay Storm. Shaw played college football at the University of Southern Mississippi. He was the MVP of ArenaBowl XV. He was also a member of the Kansas City Chiefs, Berlin Thunder and New Orleans Saints.

== Early life and college ==
Terrill Shaw was born on February 4, 1976, in Jackson, Mississippi. He attended Magee High School in Magee, Mississippi. He did not play football until his senior year of high school.

Shaw played college football for the Southern Miss Golden Eagles of the University of Southern Mississippi.

== Professional career ==
Shaw spent the 2000 Arena Football League season with the Buffalo Destroyers. He was placed on recallable waivers by the Destroyers on April 9, 2001. Shaw was then signed to the Grand Rapids Rampage's practice squad. He was promoted to the active roster on May 25, 2001. He was the MVP of ArenaBowl XV after accumulating twelve receptions, 172 receiving yards, and five touchdowns in the Rampage's 62–42 victory over the Nashville Kats on August 19, 2001.

Shaw was signed by the Kansas City Chiefs on January 11, 2002. He was allocated to NFL Europe's Berlin Thunder in February 2002. He was released from the Thunder in April 2002 and chose to opt out of his Chiefs contract. Shaw then returned to the Rampage for the 2002 and 2003 seasons. He signed with the New Orleans Saints on June 16, 2003. He was released by the Saints on August 25, 2003.

Shaw signed with the Las Vegas Gladiators on October 28, 2003. He was released by the Gladiators on May 18, 2004. Shaw signed with the Philadelphia Soul on May 20, 2004, and played for them during the 2004 and 2005 seasons. He then played from 2005 to 2006 with the Dallas Desperados. He was signed by the Tampa Bay Storm on October 20, 2006. He was released by the Storm on October 2, 2008.

== Personal life ==
Shaw's brother, Harold, also played football. They were teammates together on the Rampage from 2001 to 2002.
