= Eric Houle =

American football player (1981–2011)

No. 16
- Position: Placekicker

Personal information
- Born: November 2, 1981; Flint, Michigan, U.S.
- Died: March 27, 2011 (aged 29)
- Listed height: 5 ft 7 in (1.70 m)
- Listed weight: 175 lb (79 kg)

Career information
- High school: Kearsley (Flint, Michigan)
- College: Saginaw Valley State (2000–2003)

Career history
- Las Vegas Gladiators (2006); New Orleans VooDoo (2007); Grand Rapids Rampage (2008); Arizona Rattlers (2008)

Eric David Houle (November 2, 1981 – March 26, 2011) was a placekicker who played in the Arena Football League (AFL) for the Arizona Rattlers.

== Early life ==
Houle attended Kearsley High School in Flint, Michigan, and was a student and a letterman in football and soccer. In football, he was a first team All-Big Nine Conference selection as a senior. In soccer, he was a three-time All-District selection.

== College career ==
Houle attended Saginaw Valley State University and was a kicker.

== Professional career ==
Eric Houle played for four arena football teams: the Las Vegas Gladiators (2006), New Orleans VooDoo (2007), Grand Rapids Rampage (2008), and the Arizona Rattlers (2008).

== Death ==
Houle died on March 27, 2011, after an automobile accident.
