= Hank Edwards (gridiron football) =

American gridiron football player (born 1983)

No. 11
- Position: Wide receiver

Personal information
- Born: May 2, 1983 (age 43); Hollywood, Florida, U.S.
- Listed height: 6 ft 2 in (1.88 m)
- Listed weight: 190 lb (86 kg)

Career information
- College: Texas Southern
- NFL draft: 2006: undrafted

Career history
- Tampa Bay Storm (2006–2008); Toronto Argonauts (2009); Tampa Bay Storm (2010–2011); San Jose SaberCats (2012); Jacksonville Sharks (2013)*; Spokane Shock (2014); Pittsburgh Power (2014)
- * Offseason or practice squad member only

Career CFL statistics
- Receptions: 2
- Receiving yards: 17
- Receiving TDs: 0

Career AFL statistics
- Receptions: 447
- Receiving yards: 5,897
- Receiving TDs: 124
- Stats at ArenaFan.com

Hank Edwards (born May 2, 1983) is an American former professional football wide receiver. He was originally signed by the Tampa Bay Storm as a street free agent in 2006. He played college football at Texas Southern.
