= Jeroid Johnson =

American football player (born 1974)

No. 5
- Position: Defensive back

Personal information
- Born: March 20, 1974 (age 52); New Orleans, Louisiana
- Listed height: 5 ft 10 in (1.78 m)
- Listed weight: 185 lb (84 kg)

Career information
- College: Oklahoma State

Career history
- New Jersey Red Dogs (2000); New Jersey / Las Vegas Gladiators (2001–2004); Chicago Rush (2005); Orlando Predators (2006); Tampa Bay Storm (2007–2008)

Awards and highlights
- AFL career tackle leader
- Stats at ArenaFan.com

Jeroid Johnson (born March 20, 1974) is an American former football defensive back who played in the Arena Football League. He played college football at Oklahoma State.

Johnson played for the New Jersey Red Dogs, New Jersey / Las Vegas Gladiators, Chicago Rush, Orlando Predators and Tampa Bay Storm.
