= 2006 Georgia Force season =

Arena Football League team season

- Head coach: Doug Plank
- Home stadium: Philips Arena

Results
- Record: 8–8
- Division place: 3rd
- Playoffs: L 62–27 to Dallas

The 2006 Georgia Force season was the fifth season for the team in the Arena Football League. They tried to improve upon their 11–5 record from 2005 in the Southern Division, and looked to return to the playoffs. They finished with a record of 8–8, and lost in the second round of the playoffs.

== Coaching ==
Doug Plank, head coach since 2005, entered his second year as Force head coach.

== Stats ==
=== Offense ===
==== Quarterback ====
Player	Comp.	Att.	Comp%	Yards	TD's	INT's	Long	Rating
Matt Nagy	372	527	70.6	4265	85	11	48	125.5
Scott Dreisbach	4	11	36.4	36	0	0	17	46

==== Running backs ====
Player	Car.	Yards	Avg.	TD's	Long
Robert Thomas	34	106	3.1	7	12
Kevin Aldridge	20	91	4.6	6	18
Matt Huebner	7	16	2.3	2	7
Chris Jackson	7	10	1.4	1	12
Chris Johnson	1	8	8	0	8
Rob Carey	3	7	2.3	0	8
Derek Lee	3	6	2	0	6
Matt Nagy	17	6	0.4	5	2
Jacques Rumph	5	5	1	0	3
Scott Dreisbach	4	2	0.5	0	2
Glen Gauntt	1	0	0	0	0
Carl Morris	1	0	0	0	0
Jamin Elliott	1	−1	−1	0	−1

==== Wide receivers ====
Player	Rec.	Yards	Avg.	TD's	Long
Chris Jackson	119	1438	12.1	36	45
Derek Lee	127	1427	11.2	26	48
Jamin Elliott	66	745	11.3	12	29
Chris Johnson	20	237	11.9	4	31
Rob Carey	18	225	12.5	5	34
Jacques Rumph	21	214	10.2	1	44
Robert Thomas	8	52	6.5	1	13
Jermaine Smith	4	51	12.8	0	18
Carl Morris	5	41	8.2	1	10
Ricky Parker	3	34	11.3	0	15
Kevin Aldridge	2	21	10.5	0	13
Matt Huebner	2	13	6.5	1	10
Nick Ward	2	12	6	0	8
Bruce McClure	1	8	8	0	8
Rober Freeman	1	7	7	0	7

==== Touchdowns ====
Player	TD's	Rush	Rec	Ret	Pts
Chris Jackson	40	1	36	3	240
Derek Lee	26	0	26	0	162
Jamin Elliott	12	0	12	0	90
Robert Thomas	8	7	1	0	48
Kevin Aldridge	6	6	0	0	36
Rob Carey	5	0	5	0	30
Matt Nagy	5	5	0	0	30
Chris Johnson	4	0	4	0	24
Matt Huebner	3	2	1	0	18
Carl Morris	1	0	1	0	6
Jacques Rumph	1	0	1	0	6

=== Defense ===
Player	Tackles	Solo	Assisted	Sack	Solo	Assisted	INT	Yards	TD's	Long
Chris Brown	124	107	34	0	0	0	4	90	3	49
Nate Coggins	91.5	80	23	0	0	0	1	18	1	18
Willie Gary	53.5	48	11	0	0	0	1	19	0	19
Rober Freeman	42.5	37	11	0	0	0	1	18	0	18
Robert Thomas	30	24	12	2	2	0	0	0	0	0
Ricky Parker	27.5	27	1	0	0	0	0	0	0	0
Jamin Elliott	27	24	6	0	0	0	1	36	1	36
Chris Demaree	26.5	23	7	4	3	2	0	0	0	0
Nick Ward	26	24	4	0	0	0	1	20	1	20
Rob Carey	22.5	19	7	0	0	0	0	0	0	0
Kevin Aldridge	18	15	6	1	1	0	1	14	0	14
Jermaine Smith	16.5	13	7	6	5	2	0	0	0	0
Derek Lee	15.5	12	7	0	0	0	3	45	1	45
Adam Metts	14.5	13	3	2	2	0	0	0	0	0
Jacques Rumph	13	10	6	0	0	0	0	0	0	0
Chris Johnson	11	9	4	0	0	0	0	0	0	0
Earthwind Moreland	9.5	9	1	0	0	0	0	0	0	0
Abdul-Salam Noah	9	7	4	1	1	0	0	0	0	0
Carl Morris	8.5	7	3	0	0	0	1	−1	0	−1
Bobby Setzer	7	6	2	2	2	0	0	0	0	0
Marcus Keyes	5.5	5	1	1	1	0	0	0	0	0
Matt Huebner	5	4	2	.5	0	1	0	0	0	0
Nelson Garner	3.5	3	1	0	0	0	0	0	0	0
Jason Gamble	2	1	2	.5	0	1	0	0	0	0
Glen Gauntt	2	2	0	0	0	0	0	0	0	0
Chris Jackson	1	1	0	0	0	0	0	0	0	0
Dary Myricks	1	1	0	0	0	0	0	0	0	0
Matt Nagy	1	1	0	0	0	0	0	0	0	0
Bruce McClure	1	0	1	0	0	0	0	0	0	0

=== Special teams ===
==== Kick return ====
Player	Ret	Yards	TD's	Long	Avg	Ret	Yards	TD's	Long	Avg
Chris Jackson	57	1107	2	58	19.4	4	94	1	50	23.5
Jamin Elliott	17	259	0	25	15.2	0	0	0	0	0
Rob Carey	9	136	0	29	15.1	0	0	0	0	0
Jacques Rumph	10	104	0	29	10.4	1	31	0	31	31
Chris Johnson	4	57	0	16	14.3	2	17	0	9	8.5
Rober Freeman	4	53	0	19	13.3	0	0	0	0	0
Nick Ward	1	3	0	3	3	0	0	0	0	0
Chris Brown	1	0	0	0	0	0	0	0	0	0
Willie Gary	0	0	0	0	0	1	0	0	0	0
Robert Thomas	1	0	0	0	0	1	1	0	1	1
Derek Lee	1	−3	0	−3	−3	0	0	0	0	0

==== Kicking ====
Player	Extra pt.	Extra pt. Att.	FG	FGA	Long	Pct.	Pts
Nelson Garner	97	116	6	13	31	0.462	115
Keith Gispert	24	27	6	13	43	0.462	42
