= 2007 Georgia Force season =

Arena Football League team season

- Head coach: Doug Plank
- Home stadium: Philips Arena

Results
- Record: 14–2
- Division place: 1st
- Playoffs: TBD

The 2007 Georgia Force season was the sixth season for the team in the Arena Football League. They tried to improve upon their 8–8 record from 2006 in the Southern Division, and looked to return to the playoffs. They went 14–2 and had the #2 spot in their conference in the AFL playoffs. They lost the National Conference Championship 56–66 to the Columbus Destroyers.

== Coaching ==
Doug Plank, head coach since 2005, entered his third year as Force head coach.

== Season schedule ==
Week	Date	Opponent	Home/Away Game	Result
1	March 3	Arizona Rattlers	Away	W 69–65
2	March 11	Austin Wranglers	Home	W 60–51
3	March 17	Tampa Bay Storm	Away	W 61–47
4	March 24	San Jose SaberCats	Home	W 64–62
5	March 30	Columbus Destroyers	Away	L 62–61
6	April 9	Philadelphia Soul	Away	W 57–49
7	April 15	Las Vegas Gladiators	Home	W 69–68
8	April 21	Dallas Desperados	Home	W 78–63
9	April 27	New Orleans VooDoo	Away	W 72–57
10	May 4	Orlando Predators	Home	W 55–34
11		Bye	Week	
12	May 19	Los Angeles Avengers	Away	L 57–51
13	May 26	Tampa Bay Storm	Home	W 52–38
14	June 2	Columbus Destroyers	Home	W 54–33
15	June 9	Austin Wranglers	Away	W 81–64
16	June 15	Orlando Predators	Away	W 55–44
17	June 24	New Orleans VooDoo	Home	W 68–42

== Playoff schedule ==
Round	Date	Opponent	Home/Away	Result
1st		Bye	Week	
2nd	July 8	(4) Philadelphia Soul	Home	W 65–39
3rd	July 14	(6) Columbus Destroyers	Home	L 56–66

== Stats ==
=== Offense ===
==== Quarterback ====
Player	Comp.	Att.	Comp%	Yards	TD's	INT's	Long	Rating
Chris Greisen	392	530	74	4851	117	12	49	132

==== Running backs ====
Player	Car.	Yards	Avg.	TD's	Long
Matt Huebner	34	122	3.6	5	24
Troy Bergeron	10	81	8.1	0	19
John Ritcher	20	58	2.9	2	21
Chris Greisen	14	25	1.8	6	12
Chris Jackson	9	19	2.1	4	8
Jarrick Hillery	11	9	.8	3	4
Derek Lee	1	2	2	0	2
Bruce McClure	1	1	1	1	1
James MacPherson	1	1	1	1	1

==== Wide receivers ====
Player	Rec.	Yards	Avg.	TD's	Long
Chris Jackson	145	1915	13.2	47	46
Troy Bergeron	132	1736	13.2	41	49
Derek Lee	83	886	10.7	20	45
Andy McCullough	60	434	7.2	3	21
Carl Morris	14	145	10.4	5	40
Matt Huebner	5	62	12.4	1	20
Fitu Tu'ua	4	39	9.8	1	23
Bruce McClure	3	23	7.7	1	11
Jarrick Hillery	1	22	22	0	22
John Ritcher	2	20	10	2	17
Shane Grice	1	7	7	0	7
Marcus Keyes	1	6	6	0	6
James Clark	2	5	2.5	0	4

==== Touchdowns ====
Player	TD's	Rush	Rec	Ret	Pts
Chris Jackson	51	4	47	0	306
Troy Bergeron	42	0	41	1	252
Derek Lee	20	0	20	0	120
Chris Greisen	6	6	0	0	36
Matt Huebner	6	5	1	0	36
Carl Morris	5	0	5	0	30
John Ritcher	4	2	2	0	24
Jarrick Hillery	3	3	0	0	22
Andy McCullough	3	0	3	0	18
Bruce McClure	2	1	1	0	14
Fitu Tu'ua	1	0	1	0	6

=== Defense ===
Player	Tackles	Solo	Assisted	Sack	Solo	Assisted	INT	Yards	TD's	Long
Hamin Milligan	100	93	14	0	0	0	4	93	0	41
Reggie Doster	78	68	20	0	0	0	6	31	0	11
David Crocker	60.5	51	19	0	0	0	0	0	0	0
Willie Gary	59	51	16	0	0	0	0	0	0	0
Jarrick Hillery	43	36	14	0	0	0	1	15	0	15
James Whitley	36.5	31	11	0	0	0	1	0	0	0
Eric Johnson	35.5	27	17	0	0	0	1	0	0	0
Umar Muhammad	35.5	26	19	8	8	0	0	0	0	0
Matt Huebner	20	15	10	1	1	0	0	0	0	0
Mike Sutton	19.5	13	13	4	4	0	0	0	0	0
Troy Bergeron	18	15	6	0	0	0	0	0	0	0
Ernest Allen	17.5	15	5	6.5	6	1	0	0	0	0
Jermaine Smith	13.5	11	5	7.5	7	1	1	14	1	14
Andy McCullough	9.5	7	5	0	0	0	0	0	0	0
Adam Metts	6.5	5	3	1	1	0	0	0	0	0
Prentice Purnell	4.5	3	3	0	0	0	0	0	0	0
Derek Lee	4	3	2	0	0	0	0	0	0	0
John Ritcher	4	2	4	0	0	0	0	0	0	0
Brent Holmes	3	3	0	0	0	0	0	0	0	0
Matt Jackson	3	3	0	0	0	0	0	0	0	0
Carl Morris	2.5	2	1	0	0	0	0	0	0	0
Dan Burnett	2	2	0	0	0	0	0	0	0	0
Chris Jackson	2	2	0	0	0	0	0	0	0	0
Bruce McClure	1.5	0	3	0	0	0	0	0	0	0
Carlos Martinez	1.5	1	1	0	0	0	0	0	0	0
James Clark	1	1	0	0	0	0	0	0	0	0
Keith Gispert	1	1	0	0	0	0	0	0	0	0
Shane Grice	1	1	0	0	0	0	0	0	0	0
Marcus Keys	1	1	0	0	0	0	0	0	0	0
Fitu Tu'ua	1	1	0	0	0	0	0	0	0	0

=== Special teams ===
==== Kick return ====
Player	Ret	Yards	TD's	Long	Avg	Ret	Yards	TD's	Long	Avg
Jarrick Hillery	31	539	0	56	17.4	2	18	0	14	9
Chris Jackson	31	460	0	34	14.8	0	0	0	0	0
Troy Bergeron	13	287	1	56	22.1	0	0	0	0	0
Brett Holmes	4	59	0	19	14.8	0	0	0	0	0
Derek Lee	1	1	0	1	1	0	0	0	0	0
David Crocker	0	0	0	0	0	2	4	0	3	2

==== Kicking ====
Player	Extra pt.	Extra pt. Att.	FG	FGA	Long	Pct.	Pts
Carlos Martinez	47	56	3	5	38	.600	56
Xavier Beitia	45	58	2	2	29	1.000	51
Keith Gispert	15	19	0	0	0	.000	15
Dan Burnett	7	9	0	0	0	.000	7
