= Willie Gary =

Willie Gary may refer to:

- Willie E. Gary (born 1947), American attorney
- Willie Gary (American football) (born 1978), American football player
