= Matt Nagy =

American football player and coach (born 1978)

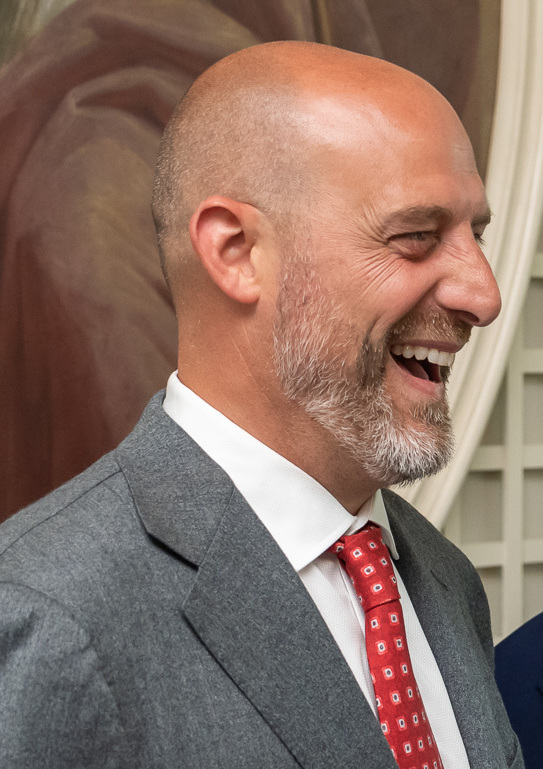
- Nagy in 2023

New York Giants
- Title: Offensive coordinator

Personal information
- Born: April 24, 1978 (age 48); Dunellen, New Jersey, U.S.
- Listed height: 6 ft 2 in (1.88 m)
- Listed weight: 220 lb (100 kg)

Career information
- Position: Quarterback (No. 11)
- High school: Manheim Central (Manheim, Pennsylvania)
- College: Delaware (1996–2000)
- NFL draft: 2001: undrafted

Career history

Playing
- New York Dragons (2002–2003); Carolina Cobras (2004); Georgia Force (2005–2006); Columbus Destroyers (2007–2008); Philadelphia Eagles (2009)*
- * Offseason or practice squad member only

Coaching
- Manheim Central HS (PA) (2001) Quarterbacks coach; Cedar Crest HS (PA) (2002–2003) Quarterbacks coach; Palmyra Area HS (PA) (2008–2009) Offensive coordinator; Philadelphia Eagles (2008–2012); Coaching intern (2008–2009); Coaches' assistant (2010); Offensive quality control coach (2011–2012); Kansas City Chiefs (2013–2017); Quarterbacks coach (2013–2015); Offensive coordinator (2016–2017); Chicago Bears (2018–2021) Head coach; Kansas City Chiefs (2022–2025); Senior assistant & quarterbacks coach (2022); Offensive coordinator (2023–2025); New York Giants (2026–present) Offensive coordinator

Awards and highlights
- As a player: Third-team I-AA All-American (2000); First-team All-A-10 (2000); Second-team All-Arena (2005); As a coach: 2× Super Bowl champion (LVII, LVIII); AP NFL Coach of the Year (2018); PFWA Coach of the Year (2018)

Career AFL statistics
- TD–INT: 374–55
- Passing yards: 18,866
- Passer rating: 115.11
- Stats at ArenaFan.com

Head coaching record
- Regular season: 34–31 (.523)
- Postseason: 0–2 (.000)
- Career: 34–33 (.507)
- Coaching profile at Pro Football Reference

Matthew Nagy (/ˈnɛɡi/ NEH-ghee or /ˈnæɡi/ NAG-ee; born April 24, 1978) is an American professional football coach and former quarterback who is currently the offensive coordinator of the New York Giants of the National Football League (NFL). He was the head coach of the Chicago Bears from 2018 to 2021. Nagy served as the offensive coordinator of the Kansas City Chiefs in two separate stints, from 2016 to 2017 and from 2023 to 2025.

As a quarterback, Nagy played college football for the Delaware Fightin' Blue Hens from 1997 to 2000, setting various school passing records. After failing to receive an NFL contract, Nagy joined the Arena Football League (AFL), where he spent six seasons playing for the New York Dragons, Carolina Cobras, Georgia Force, and Columbus Destroyers.

After finishing his playing career, Nagy became an assistant coach with the Philadelphia Eagles in 2009, spending five seasons in various offensive positions under head coach Andy Reid. In 2013, when Reid joined the Kansas City Chiefs, Nagy followed him to become the quarterbacks coach, a role Nagy served until he was promoted to offensive coordinator in 2016. Nagy was named the Bears' head coach in 2018, and in that season led the team to their first NFC North division title and playoff appearance since 2010. He was part of the Chiefs' coaching staff that won Super Bowl LVII and Super Bowl LVIII.

== Early life ==
Matthew Nagy was born on April 24, 1978, in Dunellen, New Jersey, and lived in Piscataway as a toddler. His parents, Gail Stouch and Bill Nagy, divorced when he was three years old, after which Matt moved with Stouch from Piscataway to Manheim, Pennsylvania. Growing up, Nagy participated in various sports like football, with teammates describing him as being very competitive; close friend and football teammate Eric Zeigler quipped that he "couldn't imagine how someone cared that much, even if it was about a basketball game on his driveway."

Nagy played high school football and basketball for Manheim Central High School in Pennsylvania, becoming the starting quarterback in the former as a junior. In 1994, Nagy led the Barons to the Pennsylvania Interscholastic Athletic Association (PIAA) Class AAA playoffs, where they reached the semifinals against the Berwick Bulldogs. Entering the game, Manheim Central was on a 26-game winning streak and was ranked No. 1 in Class AAA and No. 17 in USA Today's national rankings. While the Barons primarily used the veer running offense, head coach Mike Williams elected to switch to a pass-heavy system for the Berwick game to surprise the Bulldogs. Nagy completed 20 of 28 passes for 307 yards and two touchdowns in the semifinal, but threw an interception with 28 seconds remaining to seal a 37–30 loss.

In 1995, Nagy threw for 1,928 yards and 21 touchdowns and ran for 358 yards and six touchdowns. Manheim Central went 13–0 with over 5,500 total offensive yards and averaged 48.3 points per game in their final seven matches. However, the Barons lost to Berwick in the semifinal for the second straight season, with Nagy once again being intercepted late in the game to clinch a narrow 18–17 loss. He ended his senior year by being named Lancaster County Most Valuable Player. Nagy graduated high school with a 26–2 record and over 3,500 passing yards.

== College career ==
Despite his success in high school, Nagy did not receive many offers from NCAA Division I-A schools due to his slow 40-yard dash time of 4.7 seconds and small stature at 6 ft 1 1/2 in (1.87 m) and 190 lb (86 kg). While schools like Syracuse and Wake Forest seriously considered Nagy, they ultimately withdrew upon signing other quarterbacks. Instead, he was offered scholarships from Division I-AA schools Delaware and New Hampshire, gaining interest in the former while attending James Madison's game against them in 1995. Although Rutgers head coach Terry Shea also expressed interest in recruiting him, Nagy verbally committed to Delaware.

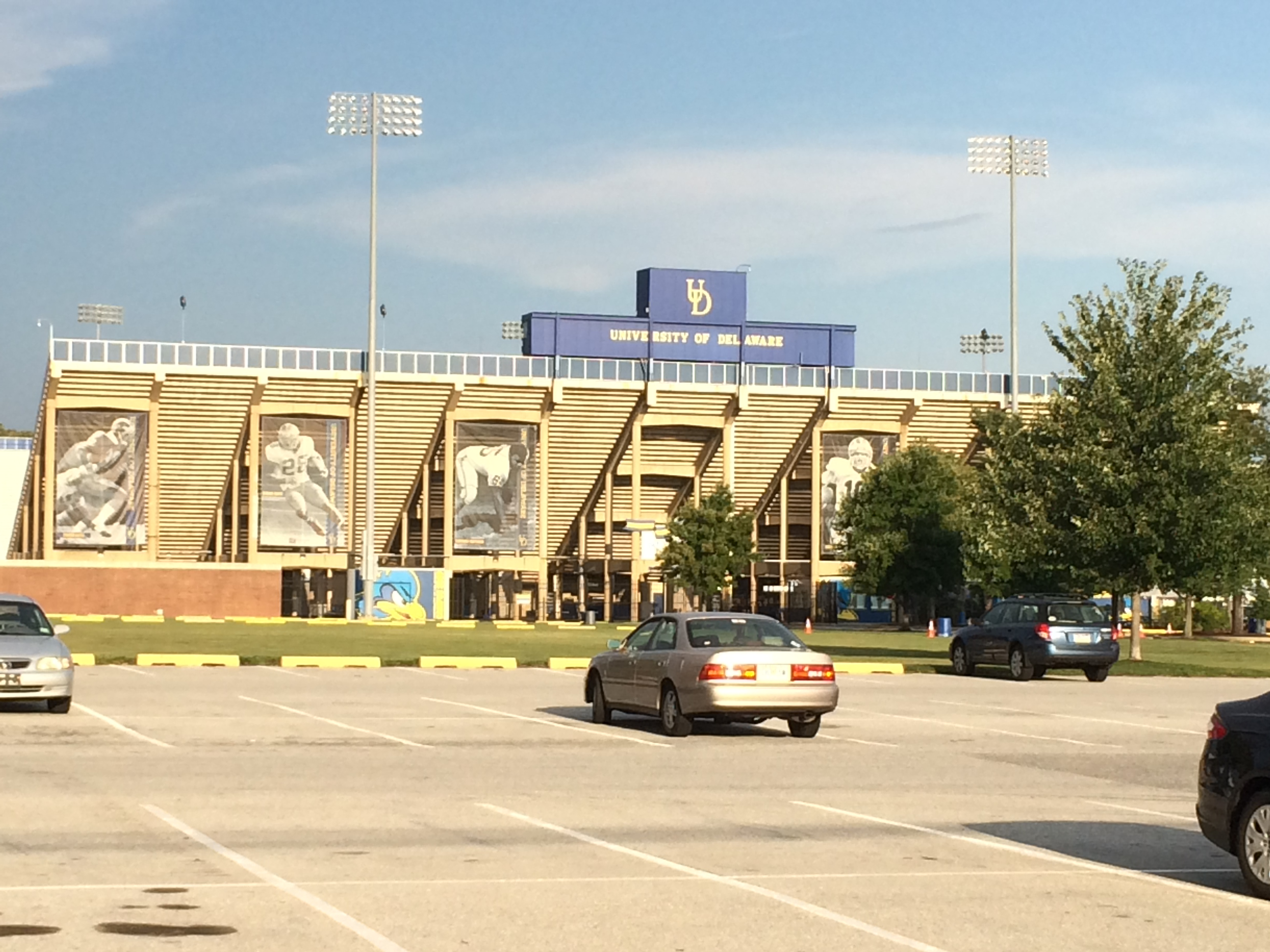
Delaware Stadium (pictured in 2014), where Nagy played college football for the Fightin' Blue Hens

Nagy played for the Delaware Fightin' Blue Hens from 1997 to 2000. While the Blue Hens traditionally used a run-heavy Wing T offense under head coach Tubby Raymond, Nagy and more talented receivers led to an increase in passing; in 2000, Delaware's offense attempted at least 30 passes in eight of thirteen games. Teammates and future coaching colleagues of Nagy's included Chiefs general manager Brett Veach and Bears assistant Brian Ginn, the latter being the starting quarterback prior to Nagy.

After redshirting his freshman year, Nagy served as Ginn's backup in 1997. When Ginn hurt his shoulder in the first round of the I-AA playoffs, Nagy replaced him as starter. Taking on Georgia Southern in the quarterfinal, Nagy completed nine of 15 passes for 125 yards as the Blue Hens won 16–7. In the semifinal against McNeese State, he threw two second-half touchdown passes but a last-second field goal pushed McNeese State to a 21–20 victory.

Ginn and Nagy shared the starting job to open the 1998 campaign, but the former broke his leg in the third game of the year against West Chester and was unable to play for the remainder of the season. Nagy went on to set 11 school single-season passing records, including yards in a season (2,916) and yards in a game (556 against Connecticut), as he ended the year with 20 touchdown passes against 12 interceptions and a 157.36 passer rating, the second-best in the nation. Nagy also helped wide receiver Eddie Conti break the NCAA record for receiving yards in a season with 1,712 on 98 receptions.

In 1999, Nagy became the permanent starter ahead of Ginn. Seven games into the season, Nagy suffered a high ankle sprain in a 26–19 loss to UMass, forcing him to miss time and snapping a 15-game starting streak. With Ginn, the Blue Hens won the next two games. Nagy made a limited return the following week against Rhode Island, entering the game during the third quarter, where he failed to complete each of his four pass attempts before being substituted for Mike Medley in the final period. Ginn remained the starter for the season finale against Villanova. After Ginn was briefly knocked out of the game, Nagy filled in early in the fourth quarter and threw a 22-yard touchdown pass to Butter Pressy to put the Blue Hens up 45–24. However, Villanova scored 21 unanswered points to tie the game before winning 51–45 in overtime.

In his senior year in 2000, Nagy and the Blue Hens won all but one game to end the regular season ranked second in Division I-AA, while the offense averaged 42.6 points and 460 yards per game. Delaware opened the 2000 I-AA playoffs by blowing out Portland State 49–14, during which Nagy threw for 263 yards, two touchdowns, and an interception; the yards elevated Nagy's season total to 2,981, surpassing the school record he set in 1998. A 47–22 victory over Lehigh in the quarterfinal followed as Nagy recorded 266 passing yards, enabling him to the first quarterback in Delaware history to break 3,000 passing yards in a season, and two touchdowns. The Blue Hens' season came to an end in the semifinal when they lost to Georgia Southern 27–18. Nagy completed 16 of 38 attempts for 189 yards and an interception in his final college game. Nagy ended the season with 3,436 passing yards, setting a school record that stood until Joe Flacco eclipsed the mark in 2007, and a program-best 29 touchdown throws. For his campaign, Nagy was named third-team I-AA All-American, becoming Delaware's first All-American quarterback since Rich Gannon in 1986.

Nagy concluded his college career with 8,214 passing yards, 58 touchdown passes, and a rating of 146.74, all of which were the best in team history. As a student, Nagy majored and earned a bachelor's degree in health and physical education (PE). In June 2019, he returned to the university to speak at the school's commencement ceremony and received an honorary degree as a Doctor of Science.

== Professional career ==
"It's a unique game that I've really started to love. I think I've found my niche. It's perfect for me because it's not like I'm going to do a lot of running back there (in the passing pocket)."

— Nagy on arena football in 2006

After not being selected in the 2001 NFL draft, Nagy attracted interest from the New York Giants as a free agent, though their acquisition of Jesse Palmer ended that possibility. On September 11, Nagy participated in a tryout with the Green Bay Packers, but was not signed. Later auditions with the Jacksonville Jaguars, Dallas Cowboys, and New York Jets – the third coming after beginning his arena football career in 2002 – and a phone conversation with Minnesota Vikings officials also failed to result in contracts.

Talking about his efforts to make the NFL, Nagy said in 2018, "I was at a point where I'm out of college [and] I'm kind of figuring which direction I'm going to go. Am I going to get a chance in the NFL? Am I going to use my degree and become a teacher? Am I going to try a lower-level league in the football world?"

=== New York Dragons ===
Without any opportunities in the NFL, Nagy tried out for the New York Dragons of the Arena Football League. There, he caught the eye of head coach John Gregory, who likened Nagy to his former Iowa Barnstormers star and Pro Football Hall of Fame quarterback Kurt Warner as the two were comparable in size, possessed the ability to throw while running, and shared similar leadership qualities. Gregory was also close with Raymond and formerly ran the Wing T offense, further supporting his decision to sign Nagy. The Dragons offered Nagy a three-year contract, though agent Art Weiss opted for a two-year deal.

Nagy made his AFL debut in the 2002 season opener against the Los Angeles Avengers when he replaced a struggling Danny Ragsdale in the fourth quarter; Nagy completed three of eight passes for 68 yards and a touchdown to Steve Papin as New York lost 43–25. Nagy was later named the starter for the Buffalo Destroyers game, where he was 27-of-37 for 300 yards and seven touchdowns en route to a Dragons 69–54 win. In the Detroit Fury match, Nagy was substituted out for Danny Kanell, who threw three touchdowns to lead the Dragons to a 44–37 win and subsequently became the starter. In June, Kanell's struggles against the Orlando Predators prompted Nagy to return to action in the fourth quarter, where he threw a 12-yard touchdown to Jason Maxwell for his lone score in the 52–33 loss. Aaron Garcia, who was New York's regular starting quarterback until he signed with the San Francisco 49ers in the offseason, returned to the team for the remainder of the 2002 season. Nagy started six games in his rookie year, ending with 1,242 passing yards, 27 touchdowns, and five interceptions.

During the offseason, Nagy tore his anterior cruciate ligament (ACL) during a flag football game in Lancaster, Pennsylvania that prevented him from playing the 2003 season. While rehabilitating his leg alongside trainer Steve Saunders, Nagy also spent the year receiving his real estate license and working as a substitute PE teacher. When not on the Dragons' active roster, Nagy was the team's color commentator for radio broadcasts.

=== Carolina Cobras ===
On November 13, 2003, Nagy was traded to the Carolina Cobras in exchange for lineman Tim McGill. The Cobras, who went 0–16 in 2003, hired Gregory as offensive coordinator for the 2004 season. In the first game of the year against the Dallas Desperados, Nagy recorded 282 passing yards and seven total touchdowns (six passing, one rushing) as Carolina won 67–41 and snapped a 17-game losing streak. The opening victory was followed by a 54–53 win over the Columbus Destroyers when Nagy threw the game-winning touchdown to Damien Groce as time expired. However, the Cobras lost the next four games and head coach Ed Khayat was fired, leading to Gregory's promotion. In the first game with Gregory as interim head coach, taking on the defending ArenaBowl champion Tampa Bay Storm, Carolina scored 24 unanswered points in the third quarter and Nagy had four touchdown passes as the Cobras won 54–43; it was the Cobras' first home win since 2002.

After Carolina dropped to 3–7, including winning only one of their last eight games, Gregory was replaced by defensive coordinator Ron Selesky, while Rickey Foggie became the starting quarterback for the rest of the season. Carolina ended the season 6–10, and Nagy completed 237 of 348 passes for 2,371 yards, 47 touchdowns, and six interceptions in ten starts. At the time of his benching, Nagy's 2,371 passing yards ranked sixth in the league.

=== Georgia Force ===
After becoming a free agent, Nagy visited the Philadelphia Soul with the hope of playing near home; instead they signed Tony Graziani. The Colorado Crush also offered Nagy a contract, but he instead signed a one-year deal with the Georgia Force on October 27, 2004. Although Nagy was the backup to newly signed Jim Kubiak, Nagy felt Kubiak's injury history – he had missed much of the 2003 season with a herniated disc – gave him the best chance to play. Nagy also credited Atlanta Falcons owner Arthur Blank, who had recently purchased the Force, for influencing his decision as the Force could "almost be like a minor-league team for the Falcons. [...] It could be an opportunity for me to latch on with the Falcons."

Kubiak began the 2005 season as the starter and led the Force to a 4–1 start before suffering a season-ending left knee injury against the Austin Wranglers. Upon filling in, Nagy completed 10 consecutive throws to open his stint, with the first being a six-yard touchdown to Troy Bergeron, as the Force won 66–63; Nagy ended the game with 247 passing yards and seven touchdowns to be named Offensive Player of the Game. Head coach Doug Plank described Nagy's relief duty as "probably the single biggest event for our team. To have a setback of that magnitude – losing your quarterback – and then having Matt come in and perform the way he did, that started the momentum for the remainder of the season." With Nagy starting the next 12 games, the Force went 11–5 in the regular season.

To open the 2005 playoffs, Nagy threw five touchdowns in a 62–49 victory over the Storm. He continued his postseason success as he had seven touchdown throws and a rushing score in the 60–58 triumph over the Predators to advance to ArenaBowl XIX. In the ArenaBowl against the Crush, Nagy completed 24 of 36 passes for 247 yards and four touchdowns along with a rushing touchdown, but Colorado's Clay Rush made a 20-yard field goal as time ran out to win 51–48. Nagy finished the regular season converting 260 of 388 passes for 3,003 yards, 66 touchdowns, and ten interceptions, and was named second-team All-Arena.

In October prior to the 2006 season, Nagy convinced former Delaware teammate Jamin Elliott to join the Force. That year, Georgia regressed to an 8–8 regular season record as the team was plagued by disputes within the organization due to the disappointing campaign. When the AFL's trade deadline neared, rumors surfaced that Nagy would be traded to the Philadelphia Soul for Tony Graziani, while the Las Vegas Gladiators contacted the Force for his services. Despite his club's struggles, Nagy broke franchise single-season records in completions and attempts (372 for 527), passing yards (4,265), and touchdowns (85), and led the league in passer rating (125.5). The Force qualified for the playoffs and played the Dragons in the first round, where Nagy completed 28 of 39 of this throws for 362 yards and ten total touchdowns, nine of which came by passing, as Georgia won 72–69. A 62–27 second-round defeat courtesy of the Dallas Desperados knocked the Force out of the playoffs; although Nagy was 21 for 35 with 206 passing yards and four touchdowns, he was also intercepted twice.

On August 19, 2006, Nagy was traded to the Destroyers for lineman Mike Sutton in what the former explained was "the coaches in Georgia [wanting] to go in a different direction". Incidentally, Kubiak was instrumental in the decision to trade Nagy, having ended his playing career after 2005 to become the Force's Director of Player Personnel. Nagy ended his two-year tenure in Georgia as the team's record holder in total passing yards (7,268), completions (632), and touchdowns (151).

=== Columbus Destroyers ===
The 2007 Destroyers opened the season 6–4 before losing five consecutive games. Needing a win over the Dragons to clinch the National Conference's final playoff spot, Nagy recorded 256 passing yards and seven touchdowns to lead Columbus to a 74–43 victory and a playoff berth at 7–9. In the regular season, he threw for 3,561 yards and 75 touchdowns. In Weeks 15 and 16, Nagy also attempted two extra point conversions, both of which failed: after throwing a touchdown against the Kansas City Brigade to put the Destroyers up 47–35 with 30 seconds left, Nagy missed the ensuing kick; against Philadelphia, with Columbus leading 53–41 early in the fourth quarter, he tried a drop kick to no success.

The Destroyers played the Storm in the opening round; after throwing for five touchdowns, Nagy scored the go-ahead touchdown run with seven seconds remaining in the game. Tampa Bay's Seth Marler missed the game-winning field goal as time expired to secure the 56–55 triumph. He was named Offensive Player of the Game for his performance. In the second round, they faced the 15–1 Desperados in Dallas, the first team in league history to win 15 games in the regular season and riding a 12-game home win streak. After trailing 35–21 during the second quarter, the Destroyers scored 31 of the game's next 34 points, while Nagy was 20 for 32 for 285 yards and six touchdowns (four passing, two rushing) as Columbus upset Dallas 66–59 to make their maiden Conference Championship appearance. Nagy took on the 14–2 Force for the Conference Championship; against his former team and in what he called "his favorite game", Nagy completed 23 of 34 passes for 209 yards, five touchdowns, and an interception, while he scored on each of his two carries as the Destroyers won 66–56.

Entering ArenaBowl XXI against the San Jose SaberCats, the Destroyers had the opportunity to become the second straight 7–9 team to win the championship after the Chicago Rush in ArenaBowl XX. In three playoff games, the Columbus offense averaged 63 points, compared to 50.1 during the regular season, while Nagy had 14 touchdown passes against two interceptions. However, the Destroyers fell greatly below their postseason average, scoring 33 points in a 53–33 loss. Nagy completed 24 of 43 passes for 203 yards, four touchdowns, and two interceptions. On August 8, he signed a two-year extension with the team.

For the 2008 season, head coach Doug Kay elected to have Nagy play and serve as the de facto offensive coordinator, but the Destroyers struggled mightily as they opened the year 1–4. Before the sixth game against Tampa Bay, Lary Kuharich was hired as offensive coordinator; under Kuharich, Columbus scored on their opening possession for the first time that season and eventually won 51–49 with Nagy's six-touchdown day. The Destroyers finished the year 3–13, tied for the worst record in the league, and Kay was fired. Nagy completed a total of 358 passes (of 576 attempts) for 4,440 yards, 74 touchdowns, and eight interceptions.

The AFL folded in late 2008 due to the Great Recession, ending Nagy's playing career. In six seasons, he recorded over 18,000 passing yards, 374 touchdowns throws, 55 interceptions, and 22 rushing touchdowns.

=== Statistics ===
Year	Team	Passing							Rushing		
Year	Team	Cmp	Att	Pct	Yds	TD	Int	Rtg	Att	Yds	TD
2002	New York	105	178	59	1,242	27	5	106.5	5	4	0
2004	Carolina	237	348	68.1	2,371	47	6	113.8	7	8	3
2005	Georgia	260	378	68.8	3,003	66	10	121	5	14	2
2006	Georgia	372	527	70.6	4,265	85	11	125.5	18	−1	5
2007	Columbus	339	545	62.2	3,545	75	15	103.9	16	14	6
2008	Columbus	358	576	62.2	4,440	74	8	112.33	16	24	6
Career		1,671	2,552	65.5	18,866	374	55	115.11	67	63	22

== Coaching career ==
=== Early coaching ===
In 2001, Nagy returned to Manheim Central High School as quarterbacks coach. The following year, he was invited to serve the same position at Cedar Crest High School in Lebanon, Pennsylvania, where his wife, Stacey, was the girls' track coach. In addition to working with the varsity team, Nagy was also the junior varsity football team's head coach. He worked at Cedar Crest until 2003.

After interning with the Philadelphia Eagles during the 2008 NFL offseason, Nagy joined Palmyra Area High School in Palmyra, Pennsylvania as offensive coordinator. The Cougars went 5–5 in his first season. He stayed with the team through 2009, during which they recorded a 4–6 record, before departing for a full-time job in the NFL.

=== Philadelphia Eagles ===
In 2009, Veach invited Nagy to return to Philadelphia and intern for the Eagles again. On August 10, three days before their preseason game against the New England Patriots, backup quarterback Kevin Kolb suffered a knee injury; to avoid putting stress on starter Donovan McNabb and third-string A. J. Feeley, the Eagles attempted to sign Nagy as a player. Head coach Andy Reid argued that although Nagy was a coach, he was not being paid for the role and could therefore play. The NFL initially allowed the deal and Nagy practiced the next day, but the league voided it shortly after, officially saying he was still under contract with the AFL. Furthermore, teams were not allowed to hide potential players in coaching positions. Adam DiMichele was eventually signed to fill the open slot. The following year, Nagy was hired for a full-time job with the Eagles as an assistant to Reid, a position sufficiently low-level that Nagy joked it made him the "assistant to the assistant." With the Eagles, Nagy moved through the coaching ranks by following quality control coach Doug Pederson, taking his role when Pederson became the quarterbacks coach in 2011. After a 4–12 campaign in 2012, Reid was fired by the Eagles and Nagy was not retained under new head coach Chip Kelly.

=== Kansas City Chiefs ===
Following Reid being hired as the head coach for Kansas City Chiefs, he proceeded to hire Pederson and Nagy as the offensive coordinator and quarterbacks coach, respectively, to his staff. In 2016, Pederson went back to the Eagles to become their head coach, and Nagy was promoted to co-offensive coordinator alongside spread game analyst Brad Childress; during games, Childress worked from a stadium skybox and Nagy on the sidelines. Although Reid called the plays, Nagy directly communicated with the quarterback.

Before the 2017 season, the New York Jets attempted to hire Nagy as offensive coordinator, but the move was blocked by the Chiefs; then-Jets head coach Todd Bowles is a family friend of the Nagys, having played for Nagy's father in high school as well as working alongside Nagy on the Eagles coaching staff in 2012. When Childress was promoted to assistant head coach, Nagy became the lone offensive coordinator. In December, with the Chiefs at 6–5 after a 5–0 start to the season, Reid ceded play-calling duties to Nagy. Under Nagy, the Chiefs finished the regular season 4–1 and averaged 28.6 points during the stretch. Kansas City's offense, which ranked 20th in 2016, was the fifth-best unit in 2017; quarterback Alex Smith led the NFL in passer rating with 104.7 as he threw for a career-best 26 touchdown passes and 4,042 passing yards. In the Wild Card Round, the Chiefs were defeated by the Tennessee Titans after the Titans erased a 21–3 deficit in the second half to win 22–21; amid rumors that Reid was calling plays again, Nagy reaffirmed he was doing so and called the game a "failure in my book."

=== Chicago Bears ===
On January 8, 2018, Nagy was hired by the Chicago Bears to become the 16th head coach in team history. Reid gave his support for Nagy and called him the "best head-coaching candidate he's ever had." Given Nagy's relatively young age at 39, the fact that he was even given serious consideration for a head coaching position was cited as one of the first examples of the "Sean McVay effect", or the rising trend of teams hiring younger head coaches that specialized in offensive strategy. Nagy was the first Delaware alumnus to become an NFL head coach.

In assembling his staff, Nagy convinced defensive coordinator Vic Fangio, who led a top-ten-ranked Bears defense in 2017 and had also interviewed for the team's head coaching job, and his assistants to stay. Quarterbacks coach Dave Ragone was the lone Fox offensive assistant to remain in Chicago. To fill the other openings, Nagy hired coaches with previous ties to him, including Childress as a senior offensive consultant through the 2018 offseason and training camp, former Chiefs assistant special teams coordinator Brock Olivo in the same position, Ginn and Eagles colleague Bill Shuey as quality control coaches, and ex-Dragons teammate Mike Furrey as wide receivers coach.

In Nagy's first season as head coach, the Bears won the NFC North for the first time since 2010. They defeated the Green Bay Packers on December 16 to improve to 10–4, as Nagy became the second Bears' rookie head coach in team history to win 10 games, joining George Halas in 1920. Nagy ended the regular season with two more wins, finishing his first year as a head coach with a 12–4 record; he and Paddy Driscoll (1956) are the only coaches in Bears history to have a winning record and qualify for the playoffs in their debut seasons. However, the Bears were narrowly defeated by Pederson and the Eagles in the Wild Card Round 16–15 after the game-winning field goal was blocked and hit the crossbar twice. In January 2019, Nagy received Coach of the Year honors from the Pro Football Writers Association and Associated Press. He was the first Bears coach to be given the AP award since Lovie Smith in 2005 and the fifth in team history. Nagy also became the fifth coach in team history to record at least 12 wins in a season, joining George Halas, Mike Ditka, Dick Jauron, and Lovie Smith.

After the 2018 season, Fangio departed the Bears to become the Denver Broncos head coach; to replace him, Nagy hired Chuck Pagano as defensive coordinator. Nagy also reunited with Childress, who rejoined the Bears as a senior offensive assistant, and Mark DeLeone, who was the Chiefs' inside linebackers coach during Nagy's tenure and would serve the same position in Chicago. Despite a 3–1 start to the 2019 season, offensive struggles and a four-game losing streak sank them to 4–6. Although the team won three straight games to remain in playoff contention, a Week 15 loss to the Packers dropped them to 7–7 and ended their postseason hopes. The Bears finished the season 8–8, while Nagy's combined 20 wins in 2018 and 2019 were the most by a Bears head coach in his first two seasons. Chicago continued to experience difficulties through the season, leading to an offense ranked 29th in the league for the 2019 season. Season's end inspired offensive staff changes such as firing offensive coordinator Mark Helfrich.

Among Nagy's new hirings for the 2020 season were offensive line coach Juan Castillo, who worked with him in Philadelphia, and quarterbacks coach John DeFilippo, also a former Eagles coach. The team also traded for quarterback Nick Foles, who worked with Nagy in Philadelphia and Kansas City, to compete with starter Mitchell Trubisky. The Bears started the season 5–1 but followed with a six-game losing streak. With the offense's struggles persisting through the first nine games of the year and through the stretch, including being ranked 29th in points per game and 31st in yards per play, Nagy relinquished play calling duties to new offensive coordinator Bill Lazor. Despite losing a Week 17 contest to the Packers where a win would have guaranteed them a playoff spot, the 8–8 Bears made the postseason for the second time in three years under Nagy due to winning a tiebreaker with the Arizona Cardinals. They were subsequently eliminated in the Wild Card round with a 21–9 road loss to the New Orleans Saints.

Following Trubisky's departure via free agency, the 2021 season began with Andy Dalton as the Bears' starting quarterback over first-round rookie Justin Fields, while Nagy promoted safeties coach Sean Desai to defensive coordinator after Pagano retired. Fields was named the starter in Week 3 against the Cleveland Browns after Dalton suffered an injury, but the offense struggled with just 47 net yards as Fields was sacked nine times and recorded only one net passing yard. Nagy surrendered play calling back to Lazor for the next week's game against Detroit. Despite a 3–2 start, the Bears went on a five-game losing streak for the third consecutive year with Fields suffering multiple injuries. On October 25, Nagy tested positive for COVID-19, resulting in special teams coordinator Chris Tabor assuming head coaching duties for Week 8 against the San Francisco 49ers. Chicago finished the season with a 6–11 record, their first losing season since 2017 and Nagy's first as a head coach.

On January 10, 2022, both Nagy and general manager Ryan Pace were fired by the Bears. Nagy's tenure in Chicago concluded with a 34–31 (.523) record in four seasons, including an 0–2 playoff record. In a statement released following his dismissal, Nagy thanked the team "for the opportunity to lead one of the game's most storied franchises" and described his stint as "four years I'll always remember."

=== Kansas City Chiefs (second stint) ===
Nagy was brought back by the Chiefs on February 25, 2022, as a senior assistant and quarterbacks coach, replacing the outgoing Mike Kafka. Reid described rehiring Nagy as the "logical answer" as he wanted a coach familiar with the current staff and roster, particularly quarterback Patrick Mahomes, with whom Nagy worked in 2017. In his first season back with the Chiefs, they won Super Bowl LVII against the Philadelphia Eagles, his first Super Bowl victory.

Nagy was promoted to offensive coordinator on February 24, 2023, his second time at the position for the Chiefs. Nagy helped the Chiefs win Super Bowl LVIII, in which they defeated the San Francisco 49ers 25–22.

Following the 6–11 2025 season, Nagy's contract with the Chiefs officially ended. With Nagy choosing to not attempt to negotiate a contract extension and his desire to interview to become a head coach within the NFL, the Chiefs chose to hire Eric Bieniemy as their new offensive coordinator for the 2026 season.

=== New York Giants ===
Nagy was hired by the New York Giants to be their new offensive coordinator on February 3, 2026 under newly hired head coach John Harbaugh.

== Coaching style ==
=== Strategy ===
Upon his hiring as Bears head coach, Chicago general manager Ryan Pace called Nagy "highly intelligent", saying Nagy had a "very creative, outside-the-box thought process". Nagy considers himself an aggressive coach, a doctrine that has drawn criticism for being "too cute".

In Chicago, Nagy operated a variation of the West Coast offense inspired by Reid, completing short, quick passes to receivers and maintaining possession of the football by throwing instead of running; the quarterback is also permitted to attempt deeper throws, even if they are not completed, to force the defense to cover a wider range of the field. Wide receiver assignments were derived from the air raid offense. Quarterback struggles and defenses playing further back in coverage, which he respectively experienced with the Bears and Chiefs, prompted Nagy to gradually shift toward shorter passes in what he nicknamed a "touchdown to checkdown mentality."

For running plays, the Bears' offensive line primarily used a gap blocking scheme in which the line creates one lane for the running back to enter, though a zone blocking scheme, which lets the back decide his own lane based on the line's motions, was also implemented during the 2018 season. Since his offenses are predicated in throwing, his teams' rushing attempts typically rank in the league's bottom half yet help the offense avoid long-yardage situations.

Nagy heavily incorporated concepts designed to distract or fool the defense such as player movement before the snap and counter runs. The most prominent tactic was the run-pass option (RPO), which allows the quarterback to analyze the defense as a play begins and make decisions based on what he sees. To better run the RPO, Nagy hired former Oregon head coach Mark Helfrich as offensive coordinator in 2018; despite Helfrich's lack of NFL coaching experience at the time, he ran a fast-paced read-option offense at Oregon, a system that would otherwise not work in the NFL as defensive players are too fast but features enough nuances to be included in Nagy's offense. During Nagy's first year as Bears head coach, 19.2 percent of the team's total play calls was an RPO, the second most in the league behind Reid's Chiefs; the previous year under John Fox, only 2.7 percent of plays were RPOs (ranked 26th). The play-action pass off a bootleg play, wherein the quarterback fakes handing off to the running back before running to his side to throw, was also a common play call in his final years with the Bears.

Trick plays were frequently used during the 2018 season, designed with assistance from Bears players and given nicknames like "Willy Wonka" and "Oompa Loompa", that featured unorthodox formations and defensive players on offense. One such play, dubbed "Santa's Sleigh" and used against the Los Angeles Rams in 2018, has exclusively linemen as the five eligible receivers (including four defensive linemen); in the Rams game, quarterback Mitchell Trubisky faked a hand-off to defensive tackle Akiem Hicks posing as a running back before throwing to offensive lineman Bradley Sowell for the touchdown. Nagy draws inspiration for the plays from his career in arena football, where players often played both offense and defense and tackles are eligible receivers. As traditional offensive play-calling can be easily adapted and adjusted for accordingly by defenses, Nagy explained the gadget plays can confuse them and allow him to "stay one step ahead of these defensive coordinators." As Bears coach, other plays were tributes to the team's history; "Papa Bear Left" was run out of the T formation made famous by team founder and longtime head coach George "Papa Bear" Halas during the 1930s and 1940s, while "Freezer Left" was when a defensive tackle received the football on a run up the middle in a manner similar to 1980s Bears defensive lineman William "The Refrigerator" Perry. The plays decreased in use after 2018 amid the Bears' offensive struggles.

Nagy's playing career also inspired certain aspects of his offense. Player archetypes and West Coast plays such as the bubble screen and hot read are based in arena football strategy, while his preference to throw deep to stretch the defense is influenced by the indoor sport's tendency to do the same. In Kansas City, he devised running plays that relied on misdirection and jet sweeps, which were derived from his time in the Wing T at Delaware. Arena football concepts were also incorporated into the Chiefs' system during his second stint like quick ball distribution and lateral passes.

Personnel-wise, Nagy prefers players who can be utilized in multiple offensive roles. For example, he fields running backs capable of running and catching, including lining up at wide receiver. With this versatility, players can exploit certain deficiencies in the defense, such as defeating a smaller defender with his size and outmatching larger defenders with his speed. Unlike offenses that feature a top pass catcher, Nagy-led receiving success is shared between multiple players, a strategy that Sports Illustrated's Kalyn Kahler called a "football Hydra"; during Nagy's first stretch as the Chiefs' offensive coordinator, Tyreek Hill was their top receiver but tight end Travis Kelce led the team in multiple receiving categories, while wide receiver Allen Robinson topped the 2018 Bears in receiving yards yet running back Tarik Cohen had the most receptions.

As an offensive head coach, Nagy relinquished control of the defense to his defensive coordinator as he did with Vic Fangio in 2018, Chuck Pagano in 2019, and Sean Desai in 2021.

=== Team culture ===
In Chicago, Nagy received praise from players and media for his positive attitude and effect on team morale. Although the Bears struggled offensively following 2018, various outlets noted his personality enabled him to maintain locker room cohesion; in an October 2019 article, when the offense was one of the worst-ranked units in the league, NBC Sports Chicago's JJ Stankevitz divided Nagy into two personas: "Nagy the leader, and Nagy the offensive mind" with the former being "unquestioned." When Nagy's firing loomed in December 2021, Chicago Sun-Times writer Rick Morrissey explained "the Bears fell in love with a person, not a football coach."

Nagy models his philosophy after former Chicago Cubs manager Joe Maddon's phrase "Be You", which promotes individualism by urging players and coaches to enjoy the sport and freely express themselves instead of worry about the NFL's strict and businesslike nature; the line also appeared on Nagy's playbook in bold letters. In May 2018, he said, "What can happen, as a player, is you think you need to maybe try a little harder, you may have to act a little different – don't do that. Just be yourself. Do what got you here. As coaches, don't change. If you have a certain style of teaching, then teach that way. Don't change because now you're in the NFL."

Following victories in 2018, with inspiration from Maddon, Nagy created a post-game locker room celebration called "Club Dub" in which the team participated in a dance party with a disco ball, lights, and music; "dub" is a slang term for "win" ("dub" being the first vowel of "w", which references a win). According to Nagy, Club Dub was organized as a means to cherish each win considering the difficulty in finding success. His post-win speeches also included saying "Boom!" while driving his arm into the ground like a football spike, which became an unofficial rallying cry for the team.

During the 2019 season, Nagy created the Sweep the Sheds Award, consisting of a metal broom and bear head, given to an unsung Bears player after every victory. "Sweep the Sheds" is a phrase from the James Kerr book Legacy, which follows the New Zealand national rugby union team; after games, the All Blacks clean their locker room as an act of humility.

== Personal life ==
Nagy married his high school sweetheart Stacey in 2002. They have four sons: Brayden, Tate, Jaxon, and Jett. Brayden and Tate attend the University of Kansas, where the latter plays wide receiver and kick returner for the Kansas Jayhawks football team.

Before joining the Arena Football League, Nagy was a teacher in the Manheim Central School District. After his playing career ended, Nagy worked at home construction company Keystone Custom Homes, receiving the position after Steve Saunders introduced him to Keystone executive Larry Wisdom. With Wisdom's blessing, Nagy left the business after joining the Eagles full-time.

In spite of his parents' divorce, Nagy remained close with both. His father, Bill, is a former defensive line coach for New Jersey high schools, winning a state championship with Elizabeth High School in 1980. After his coaching career, Bill was a businessman for various ventures before becoming a teacher in 2009, teaching at schools in the areas where Matt was coaching at the time. Nagy has stepsiblings Luke and Jenna on his father's side; Luke played receiver and safety at Manheim Central High School.

== Head coaching record ==
Team	Year	Regular season					Postseason			
Team	Year	Won	Lost	Ties	Win %	Finish	Won	Lost	Win %	Result
CHI	2018	12	4	0	.750	1st in NFC North	0	1	.000	Lost to Philadelphia Eagles in NFC Wild Card Game
CHI	2019	8	8	0	.500	3rd in NFC North	—	—	—	—
CHI	2020	8	8	0	.500	2nd in NFC North	0	1	.000	Lost to New Orleans Saints in NFC Wild Card Game
CHI	2021	6	11	0	.353	3rd in NFC North	—	—	—	Fired
Total		34	31	0	.523		0	2	.000	
