= Glen Gauntt =

American football player (born 1978)

No. 9, 14
- Position: Quarterback

Personal information
- Born: July 23, 1978 (age 48)
- Listed height: 6 ft 2 in (1.88 m)
- Listed weight: 225 lb (102 kg)

Career information
- High school: Booker (Sarasota, Florida)
- College: South Florida (1996–1999)

Career history
- Augusta Stallions (2001–2002); Carolina Cobras (2003); Dallas Desperados (2004); Georgia Force (2005–2006); Las Vegas Gladiators (2006); Nashville Kats (2006); Georgia Force (2006); Mahoning Valley Thunder (2007); Philadelphia Soul (2008); Orlando Predators (2010)

Career AFL statistics
- Comp. / Att.: 277 / 470
- Passing yards: 3,407
- TD–INT: 67–16
- Passer rating: 102.85
- Rushing TDs: 6
- Stats at ArenaFan.com

Glen Gauntt (pronounced GANT; born July 23, 1978) is an American former professional football player who was a quarterback for six seasons in the Arena Football League (AFL) with the Carolina Cobras, Dallas Desperados, Georgia Force, Las Vegas Gladiators, Nashville Kats, Philadelphia Soul, and Orlando Predators. He played college football at the University of South Florida, where he was part of the school's first-ever football team. He was also a member of the Augusta Stallions and Mahoning Valley Thunder of the af2, the AFL's minor league. He was the primary starter for the Dallas Desperados in 2004.

== Early life ==
Glen Gauntt was born on July 23, 1978. He played high school football at Booker High School in Sarasota, Florida. He became the starting quarterback his sophomore year. Gauntt threw for 1,246 yards, 14 touchdowns, and eight interceptions on 146 passing attempts during the regular season as a senior in 1995. He was also an all-star third baseman on the baseball team in high school.

== College career ==
Gauntt was a member of the Bulls football team of the University of South Florida (USF) from 1996 to 1999 and a three-year letterman from 1997 to 1999. He initially wanted to play baseball at South Florida as well but head coach Jim Leavitt made him focus on football. The entire South Florida football team was redshirted in 1996 because the program did not begin play until 1997. Gauntt completed two of three passes for 24 yards in 1997. He played in eight games, starting one in place of the injured Chad Barnhardt, in 1998, totaling 37 completions on 59 passing attempts (62.7%) for 565 yards, five touchdowns, and two interceptions. Gauntt began the 1999 season as the starter but was benched for Marquel Blackwell during the second game of the season. Overall, Gauntt completed 19 of 42 passes (45.2%) for 153 yards and two interceptions in 1999 before quitting the team on October 18. He was a football team captain in 1999 as well. In November 1999, it was reported that he would be trying out for the school's baseball team.

== Professional career ==
Gauntt played for the Augusta Stallions of the af2 from 2001 to 2002. In 2002, he completed 306 of 519 passes for 3,787 yards, 82 touchdowns and 16 interceptions while also rushing 38 times for 62 yards and 17 touchdowns. The Stallions finished the 2002 season with a 13–3 record and lost in the playoffs to the Macon Knights.

On February 6, 2003, Gauntt was signed to the practice squad of the Carolina Cobras of the Arena Football League (AFL). He was promoted to the active roster on February 14. Due to Robert Hall being benched, Gauntt made his first career AFL start on February 28, 2003, against the Grand Rapids Rampage, completing 21 of 45 passes for 182 yards, four touchdowns, and three interceptions in a 68–34 loss. He was waived on March 6 before being re-signed to the practice squad and promoted to the active roster again on May 8, 2003. Overall, Gauntt played in three games during the 2003 season but only threw passes in one of them.

Gauntt signed with the Dallas Desperados of the AFL on January 14, 2004. He began the 2004 season as the team's starting quarterback and led the AFL in passing yards through the first six games with 1,593 while the team went 5–1. During the seventh game of the season against the Los Angeles Avengers, Gauntt only completed nine of 19 passes (47.4%) for 108 yards, one touchdown, and one interception and did not play the second half due to a sprained left knee. Walter Church then started the team's next game before Gauntt returned for the ninth game of the season. Gauntt then started the following five games as well before Scott Dreisbach started the final two games of the season. Overall, Gauntt played in all 16 games for the Desperados in 2004, recording 237 completions on 394 passing attempts (60.2%) for 3,004 yards, 58 touchdowns, and 11 interceptions, and 12 carries for 16 yards and four touchdowns. The Desperados finished the season with a 6–10 record. Gauntt was waived on October 18, 2004.

Gauntt was signed by the AFL's Georgia Force on January 21, 2005. He was waived on January 23 and signed to the team's practice squad two days later. He was promoted to the active roster on March 2, placed on recallable waivers on March 15, and recalled from waivers on March 16. Overall, Gauntt appeared in 11 games for the Force during the 2005 season, completing 15 of 18 passes (83.3%) for 177 yards and four touchdowns while also scoring one rushing touchdown. He was released on February 1, 2006.

Gauntt signed with the Las Vegas Gladiators of the AFL on February 10, 2006. He played in two games for the Gladiators in 2006, throwing one incomplete pass for an interception, before being released on February 21, 2006.

Gauntt was signed by the Nashville Kats of the AFL on March 15, 2006. He appeared in five games for the Kats during the 2006 season, posting two solo tackles but not recording a passing attempt, before being placed on injured reserve on April 20. He was waived on May 9, 2006.

Gauntt signed with the Force again on May 10, 2006. He was released on October 17, 2006.

On January 13, 2007, it was reported that Gauntt had been assigned to the Mahoning Valley Thunder of the af2. He missed some playing time that year due to a broken thumb. The Thunder finished the season with a 7—9 record.

Gauntt was signed by the AFL's Philadelphia Soul on May 10, 2008, after Tony Graziani suffered an injury. Gauntt was released on May 23, re-signed on June 12, and released again on July 7, 2008. Overall, he completed three of eight passes for 34 yards, one touchdown, and one interception that season.

Gauntt was assigned to the Orlando Predators of the AFL on February 17, 2010. He recorded one completion on four passing attempts for ten yards for the Predators that season.

== Personal life ==
In 2017, on the 20th anniversary of USF football's inaugural 1997 season, the Tampa Bay Times reported that Gauntt was working for a retractable-screen company in Sarasota.
