= Andy McCullough =

American football player (born 1976)

No. 84, 18, 81, 1, 19, 85
- Position: Wide receiver

Personal information
- Born: November 11, 1975 (age 50); Dayton, Ohio, U.S.
- Listed height: 6 ft 3 in (1.91 m)
- Listed weight: 210 lb (95 kg)

Career information
- High school: Meadowdale (Dayton)
- College: Tennessee
- NFL draft: 1998: 7th round, 204th overall pick

Career history
- New Orleans Saints (1998)*; Miami Dolphins (1998)*; Detroit Lions (1998)*; Arizona Cardinals (1998–1999); Frankfurt Galaxy (1999–2000); Kansas City Chiefs (2000)*; Tennessee Titans (2000)*; Oakland Raiders (2001)*; Frankfurt Galaxy (2001); Green Bay Packers (2002)*; Dallas Desperados (2002–2003); Georgia Force (2004); Indiana Firebirds (2004-2005); Colorado Crush (2005–2006); Chicago Rush (2007); Cleveland Gladiators (2008)
- * Offseason or practice squad member only

Awards and highlights
- World Bowl champion (1999); World Bowl MVP (VII); ArenaBowl champion (2005); AFL All-Rookie Team (2002)

Career NFL statistics
- Receptions: 3
- Receiving yards: 45
- Stats at Pro Football Reference

Career AFL statistics
- Receptions: 457
- Receiving yards: 4,937
- Receiving touchdowns: 86
- Stats at ArenaFan.com

Andy McCullough (born November 11, 1975) is an American former professional football player who was a wide receiver in the National Football League (NFL), NFL Europe and Arena Football League (AFL). He played college football for the Tennessee Volunteers and was selected by the New Orleans Saints in the seventh round of the 1998 NFL draft.

== Early life ==
McCullough attended Meadowdale High School in Dayton, Ohio, where he excelled in both football and basketball. Scouts and fans traveled to Dayton Ohio from all over the country to watch McCullough play ball. He was in the headlines every week for his exceptional play. Although he did not play a down of football until he began high school, McCullough was recruited by more than 31 different colleges for both basketball and football. He accepted a scholarship offer from the University of Tennessee to play football.

== College career ==
McCullough played college football at the University of Tennessee, where he was a four-year letterman (1994–1997). During his career with the Volunteers he played in 44 games, totaling 59 catches for 912 yards (15.5 average) and eight touchdowns. It was in his Junior and Senior year that McCullough excelled, racking up 86% of his yardage and seven touchdowns. During the 1997 season he caught the last pass of Peyton Manning's college career.

As a true freshman, McCullough played in eight games. He received for 45 yards in four catches. In his sophomore year, McCullough had nine catches totaling 81 yards and a touchdown. He finished out his junior year fourth on the Tennessee team with a total of 352 yards receiving in 24 catches and four touchdowns. In his final year, as a senior, McCullough finished with 434 yards and three touchdowns in 22 receptions. He was part of the Vols 1997 SEC Championship.In the Orange Bowl that year, he caught a 29-yard pass, the team's longest reception. He also played a major role in the Gator Bowl win over Virginia Tech

== Professional career ==
=== 1998 ===
McCullough was selected by the New Orleans Saints in the seventh round (204th overall) of the 1998 NFL draft. Subsequently, McCullough spent time with the Miami Dolphins and Detroit Lions. The Arizona Cardinals signed him on November 19, where he remained for three seasons.

=== 1999 ===
The Cardinals allocated McCullough to NFL Europe where he played for the Frankfurt Galaxy.

McCullough had a standout season in Europe, recording 48 receptions (fourth in league) for 883 yards (second in league) and ten touchdowns (third in league). He also returned eight kickoffs for 158 yards and two punts for 46 yards. In a week six match-up with the Scottish Claymores he caught a career-best eight receptions for 170 yards and three touchdowns.

McCullough earned World Bowl MVP honors as the Galaxy captured the NFL Europe League championship. He was the star of the game catching six passes for 151 yards and scored three touchdowns in Frankfurt's 38–24 win over the Barcelona Dragons.

Following the NFL Europe season, McCullough returned to Arizona. He played in two games for the Cardinals during the 1999 NFL season, catching three passes for 45 yards.

=== 2000 ===
McCullough was later released by the Arizona Cardinals. The Kansas City Chiefs signed him to the 2000 NFL season McCullough also spent time with the Tennessee Titans.

=== 2001 ===
In 2001, McCullough was signed by the Oakland Raiders and allocated to the NFL Europe League where he played, again, for the Frankfurt Galaxy. Once again he played at an all-time high. He led the team in receptions with 41 (fourth in league) and recorded 460 yards and three touchdowns.

=== 2002 ===
McCullough signed with the Dallas Desperados of the Arena Football League on January 22, 2002. He finished the season with 82 catches for 836 yards and 24 touchdowns, leading the team in all three categories. Following the season McCullough was selected to the AFL All-Rookie Team.

McCullough also played defense for Dallas, recording eight tackles, a fumble recovery and a forced fumble. He was named game MVP twice in 2002. First against Detroit, where he scored career-high totals in touchdowns (5), catches (14), and yards (152). The second, in Tampa Bay, where he led the team with a touchdown, 95 yards and 8 receptions. McCullough also set up the game-winning touchdown by recovering a fumble in overtime.

=== 2003 ===
The Dallas Desperados finished the 2003 season ranked first in total offense, and fifth in scoring with the help of McCullough, who was one of a three-part offensive attack. He experienced career highs in both receiving with 96 catches and total yards with 1,215. He tied his career-high in touchdowns with 24. He also contributed on defense for the team, racking up a career-high in tackles with 22.5 and team and career highs in fumble recoveries with three.

McCullough was named Ironman of the Game twice that season. The first time against Arizona, where he forced numerous incompletions and racked up 128 yards on offense. The second time was against Detroit, where he scored, had 64 yards and posted an interception.

McCullough received yet another game MVP with his performance in Los Angeles when he experienced the first two interceptions of his career.

McCullough also was named game MVP against Chicago, when he scored two touchdowns and caught seven passes for 118 yards.

During the playoffs, he tied for the team lead scoring 3 touchdowns, having 14 catches and receiving for 149 yards. He was named Ironman of the Game in the first round of the playoffs against Indiana when he led the team with 99 yards on nine catches and scoring three times.

=== 2004 ===
McCullough was signed by the Georgia Force on January 5, 2004. On March 11, he was part of a midseason trade, moving from Georgia to the Indiana Firebirds. Even though he only played 10 games with Indiana, he ranked third on the team in touchdowns (nine), and fifth in yards (351) and receptions (29).

=== 2005 ===
McCullough signed with the Colorado Crush in 2005. He had an outstanding year on both offense and defense. He had 16.5 tackles, two forced fumbles, two interceptions, three fumble recoveries, and broke up one pass. On offense, he finished the season with 740 yards, 11 touchdowns and 71 receptions.

During the playoffs, McCullough made a tackle and had 41 yards on three catches in the first rounds. In the Conference Championship game, McCullough caught the game-winning touchdown, catching 11 passes overall for 137 yards and four touchdowns. In the Divisional round, McCullough had one tackle, two touchdowns, 122 yards and seven receptions.

=== 2006 ===
In 2006 McCullough ranked up his best numbers as a player on the Colorado Crush. Defensively, he had 19.5 tackles, a forced fumble, and one interception. He also racked up 1,093 yards and 14 touchdowns on 92 catches. In a game in Los Angeles, McCullough added a season-high with four tackles before he was hauled out of the game on a stretcher in the fourth quarter. He was taken to an area hospital where he was diagnosed with a neck injury, a concussion, and four broken molars. McCullough was named Defensive Player of the Game this year in the contest against Nashville. During the 2006 playoffs, McCullough had an outstanding game in the Divisional Round. He had seven receptions for 106 yards and two touchdowns. McCullough also had two tackles on defense.

=== 2008 ===
McCullough signed with the Cleveland Gladiators on February 26, 2008. He started the first three games of the season, catching 14 passes for 156 yards and scoring a touchdown on a 37-yard pass from quarterback Raymond Philyaw on the first play from scrimmage against the New York Dragons in week one. The Gladiators released him in 2008 due to a broken hand, suffered during his time in the NFL, that never healed properly.

== Personal ==
McCullough earned a bachelor's degree in psychology from the University of Tennessee.

A prep basketball and football star at Meadowdale H.S. in Dayton, he averaged 29 points to lead the state of Ohio in scoring and was named second-team All-State as a basketball player. McCullough didn't begin playing football until his freshman year of high school. He was Named Street and Smith All-American, all-state, all-area and all-city and also played in the Big 33, an all-star American football game featuring the top high-school football players. McCullough helped lead his Ohio team to victory before some 16,000 fans at Hersheypark Stadium after quarterback Scott Mutryn's 74-yard completion to Tennessee-bound Andy McCullough set up Curtis Enis' 1-yard touchdown run for the game's first score with 1:33 left in the first quarter. As a split end, McCullough caught 35 passes for 595 yards and 10 touchdowns and defensively, registered 95 hits, including 10 sacks and 11 tackles for a loss as a senior. He was named city champion in his senior year and was a member of the number one recruiting class at Tennessee.
