= Jamin Elliott =

American football player (born 1979)

No. 89, 83, 3, 87, 18
- Position: Wide receiver

Personal information
- Born: October 5, 1979 (age 47); Portsmouth, Virginia, U.S.
- Listed height: 6 ft 0 in (1.83 m)
- Listed weight: 195 lb (88 kg)

Career information
- High school: Portsmouth (VA) Churchland
- College: Delaware
- NFL draft: 2002: 6th round, 203rd overall pick

Career history
- Chicago Bears (2002); New England Patriots (2003); Chicago Bears (2004)*; (2005)*; Cologne Centurions (2005); Washington Redskins (2005)*; Georgia Force (2006); Atlanta Falcons (2006–2007); Georgia Force (2008–2009)
- * Offseason or practice squad member only

Awards and highlights
- Super Bowl champion (XXXVIII); First-team All-A10 (2000)
- Stats at Pro Football Reference
- Stats at ArenaFan.com

Jamin Elliott (born October 5, 1979) is an American former professional football wide receiver. He was selected by the Chicago Bears in the sixth round in 2002 NFL draft with the 203rd overall pick. He played college football at Delaware. With the New England Patriots, he won Super Bowl XXXVIII over the Carolina Panthers.

In 2006, Elliott was convinced by former Delaware teammate Matt Nagy to join him on the Georgia Force of the Arena Football League (AFL). That year, he caught 66 passes for 745 yards and 12 touchdowns for the Force.
