= Troy Bergeron =

American football player (born 1983)

No. 11, 19, 22
- Position: Wide receiver

Personal information
- Born: December 3, 1983 (age 42); New Orleans, Louisiana
- Listed height: 6 ft 2 in (1.88 m)
- Listed weight: 195 lb (88 kg)

Career information
- High school: Shaw (GA)
- College: Middle Tennessee State
- NFL draft: 2006: undrafted

Career history
- Columbus Wardogs (2004); Georgia Force (2005); Atlanta Falcons (2006)*; Buffalo Bills (2006)*; Georgia Force (2007–2008); Columbus Lions (2009–2010); Atlanta Falcons (2009–2010); Dallas Cowboys (2010–2011)*; Cleveland Gladiators (2011)
- * Offseason or practice squad member only

Awards and highlights
- AFL All-Rookie Team (2005); AFL Rookie of the Year (2005); Second-team All-Arena (2007)

Career AFL statistics
- Receptions: 406
- Receiving yards: 5,488
- Receiving touchdowns: 126
- Total tackles: 33
- Fumble recoveries: 1
- Stats at ArenaFan.com

Troy Joseph Bergeron (born December 3, 1983) is an American former football wide receiver in the National Football League for the Buffalo Bills, Atlanta Falcons and Dallas Cowboys. He also was a member of the Georgia Force and Cleveland Gladiators in the Arena Football League. He never played college football.

== Early life ==
Bergeron attended Shaw High School. He was a three-year starter at wide receiver in a Wing T offense, that focused on running the football. As a junior in 2000, he contributed to the team winning the state championship, while being named the 2000 Columbus Ledger-Enquirer's Offensive Player of the Year.

As a senior, he posted 25 receptions for 444 yards and 7 touchdowns. He had one interception in limited duty at cornerback. He missed three games during the season because of surgery to correct compartmental syndrome in his leg.

In track, he was part of the Georgia Class 4A state champion 4 × 100 metres relay team and placed second in the 400 metres as a senior.

== College career ==
Bergeron initially accepted a football scholarship from Auburn University. Before he enrolled at the school, the coaches asked him to switch to defensive back because of a surplus at the wide receiver position, so he asked to be released from his scholarship.

He then transferred to Middle Tennessee State University, but while he was sitting out as a redshirt freshman, his fiancée gave birth to their son and Bergeron decided to move to Columbus to be with his family. He later requested to transfer to Troy University, which was closer to his home, but Middle Tennessee wouldn't release him from his commitment. He then opted to sign a professional football contract with the af2’s Columbus Wardogs and never played a down of college football.

== Professional career ==
=== Columbus Wardogs ===
In 2004, Bergeron made the Columbus Wardogs roster and became the youngest player in af2 history at 21. He recorded 77 receptions for 1,220 yards and 26 touchdowns despite missing the team's first four games. He was only the third Wardog player to reach 1,000 yards receiving. He set a franchise single-game record with 212 receiving yards against the Macon Knights. Three weeks later, he had another record-breaking performance and set three single-game team records with 14 receptions for 216 yards and six touchdowns against the Louisville Fire. He was twice named the af2's Offensive Player of the Week.

=== Georgia Force (first stint) ===
In 2005, Bergeron signed with the Georgia Force of the Arena Football League. As a rookie, he was slated to be a backup, until starter and offensive specialist Scottie Montgomery was injured in the second quarter of the season opener against the New Orleans VooDoo. Bergeron stepped in, tallying a team-high 6 receptions for 116 yards, a game-high 3 receiving touchdowns and 74 yards on three kickoff returns. He was named Offensive Player of the Game for his first AFL contest and was given the starter position.

He played in all 16 games, collecting 105 receptions for 1,372 yards, 31 touchdowns and 57 kickoff returns for 1,058 yards. He had a career-long 51-yard kickoff return and a career-long 37-yard missed field goal return against the Grand Rapids Rampage. He was named the 2005 AFL Rookie of the Year and was selected to the 2005 AFL All-Rookie Team. Along with rookie teammate Derek Lee, the duo ended the season as the top receiving touchdown tandem in the AFL with 64 combined touchdowns (Bergeron 31 and Lee 33).

=== Atlanta Falcons (first stint) ===
In 2006, he was signed by the Atlanta Falcons as an undrafted rookie free agent. He attended training camp and was released following the final pre-season game.

=== Buffalo Bills ===
On December 12, 2006, he was signed to the Buffalo Bills practice squad. He was released on February 14, 2007.

=== Georgia Force (second stint) ===
In February 2007, Bergeron re-joined the Georgia Force. He appeared in all 16 games and recorded career highs in receptions (132), receiving yards (1,736), touchdowns (41), rushing attempts (10) and rushing yards (81), while earning Second team All-Arena honors. He and teammate Wide receiver Chris Jackson became the first receiving tandem in AFL history to record at least 130 catches, 1,700 receiving yards and 40 touchdowns each.

He led the team in receptions (13) and receiving yards (194), he also recorded four touchdowns on the road against the Austin Wranglers. He also had six kickoff returns for 103 yards and one rush for 10 yards. His 194 receiving yards and 307 total yards set new single-game franchise-highs. He also added two tackles and one fumble recovery on special teams.

In 2008, Bergeron recorded 91 receptions for 1,247 yards, 24 touchdowns, 7 carries for 62 yards and 7 tackles. He also added five kickoff returns for 71 yards. The Arena Football League folded after the season.

=== Columbus Lions ===
In March 2009, Bergeron signed with the Columbus Lions of the American Indoor Football Association. He led the team in receiving yards, touchdowns and catches. He contributed to the franchise winning the SIFL championship in 2010.

=== Atlanta Falcons (second stint) ===
On April 28, 2009, he was signed by the Atlanta Falcons, only to be released on April 29 after failing his physical with a hamstring injury. He was re-signed by the team on May 10. He was waived during final cuts on September 4, and re-signed to the practice squad the next day. He was then promoted to the active roster on November 14. Bergeron was released November 16 and re-signed to the practice squad on November 18.

Ten days later, he was promoted to the 53-man roster again. On December 2, he returned to the practice squad. Due to the release of running back Verron Haynes, Bergeron was promoted to the active roster on December 5. Bergeron was waived again by the Falcons on December 7 and added to back to the practice squad on December 9. The Falcons promoted Bergeron to the active roster again on December 15 when wide receiver Brian Finneran was placed on injured reserve. He spent a total of 6 games on the active roster. He was released on September 4, 2010.

=== Cleveland Gladiators ===
On October 3, 2010, he signed with the Cleveland Gladiators of the Arena Football League.

=== Dallas Cowboys ===
On December 15, 2010, he was signed to the Dallas Cowboys' practice squad. In March 2011, because of the NFL labor dispute and lockout decision, he signed with the Cleveland Gladiators of the Arena Football League. He returned to the Cowboys after the collective bargaining agreement was signed. He was released on July 28, 2011.

== Personal life ==
In 2016, he was hired as a physical education teacher and a football assistant coach at Saint Francis Day School, Inc. He has been teaching football at Saint Francis Day School for 6 years.
