= Kevin Aldridge =

American football player (born 1980)

No. 79
- Position: Defensive end

Personal information
- Born: March 3, 1980 (age 46); Palestine, Texas, U.S.
- Listed height: 6 ft 1 in (1.85 m)
- Listed weight: 285 lb (129 kg)

Career information
- High school: Jacksonville
- College: SMU
- NFL draft: 2002: undrafted

Career history
- Tennessee Titans (2002); Barcelona Dragons (2003); St. Louis Rams (2004)*; Dallas Desperados (2004); Georgia Force (2005–2006)
- * Offseason or practice squad member only

Career NFL statistics
- Total tackles: 8
- Stats at Pro Football Reference

Kevin Lamar Aldridge (born March 3, 1980) is an American former professional football player who was a defensive end for the Tennessee Titans of the National Football League (NFL). He also played for (NFLE) of Barcelona Dragons and (Arena League) for Dallas Desperados and Georgia Force. He played college football for the SMU Mustangs.
