= Kusanti Abdul-Salaam =

American football player (born 1975)

Profile
- Position: Wide receiver / Defensive back

Personal information
- Born: March 29, 1975 (age 51); Pasadena, California
- Listed height: 5 ft 9 in (1.75 m)
- Listed weight: 175 lb (79 kg)

Career information
- College: UCLA

Career history
- Portland Forest Dragons (1999); Oklahoma Wranglers (2000–2001); Tampa Bay Storm (2002)
- Stats at ArenaFan.com

Kusanti Abdul-Salaam, birth name Andy Colbert, (born March 29, 1975) is a former arena football wide receiver/defensive back who played for the Portland Forest Dragons, Oklahoma Wranglers, Tampa Bay Storm and Georgia Force. He played college football at UCLA.

== Early life and college ==
Kusanti attended John Muir High School. He lettered in football where he played quarterback and defensive back, track where he was a sprinter and hurdler, and basketball where he played point guard. He received a full scholarship to UCLA.

After a 35–17 loss to Arizona Andy Colbert changed his name to Kusanti Abdul-Salaam due to his conversion to the Islamic faith. The name literally means: "He that is servant of Allah, with peace and salvation."

== Professional career ==
After college Abdul-Salaam went to Denmark to play professional football. In Denmark he played running back, wide receiver, and defensive back.

Kusanti played for the Portland Forest Dragons in 1999.

Kusanti played for the Oklahoma Wranglers with former UCLA teammate kicker Chris Sailer.

In 2001, Kusanti was the pick in the 2nd round of the 2001 Arena Football League dispersal draft by the Georgia Force, a new franchise team that year.

== Personal life ==
Kusanti graduated with a B.A. in history. He works as a barber and also provides home health care for the handicap. He is currently working to become a professor in history. In 2008, he began coaching for the Pasadena Polytechnical School.
