= Bobby Setzer =

American football player (born 1976)

No. 90, 76
- Position: Defensive end

Personal information
- Born: June 16, 1976 (age 50); Walnut Creek, California, U.S.
- Listed height: 6 ft 4 in (1.93 m)
- Listed weight: 280 lb (127 kg)

Career information
- High school: Salem South (Salem, Oregon)
- College: Boise State
- NFL draft: 1999: undrafted

Career history
- New York Giants (1999)*; New Orleans Saints (2000–2001)*; San Francisco 49ers (2001–2002); Chicago Bears (2002); Oakland Raiders (2004)*; Frankfurt Galaxy (2004); Georgia Force (2005–2006)
- * Offseason or practice squad member only
- Stats at Pro Football Reference

Bobby Setzer (born June 16, 1976) is an American former professional football player who was a defensive end in the National Football League (NFL). He played for the San Francisco 49ers in 2001 and the Chicago Bears in 2002. He played college football for the Boise State Broncos.
