= Booker High School (Sarasota, Florida) =

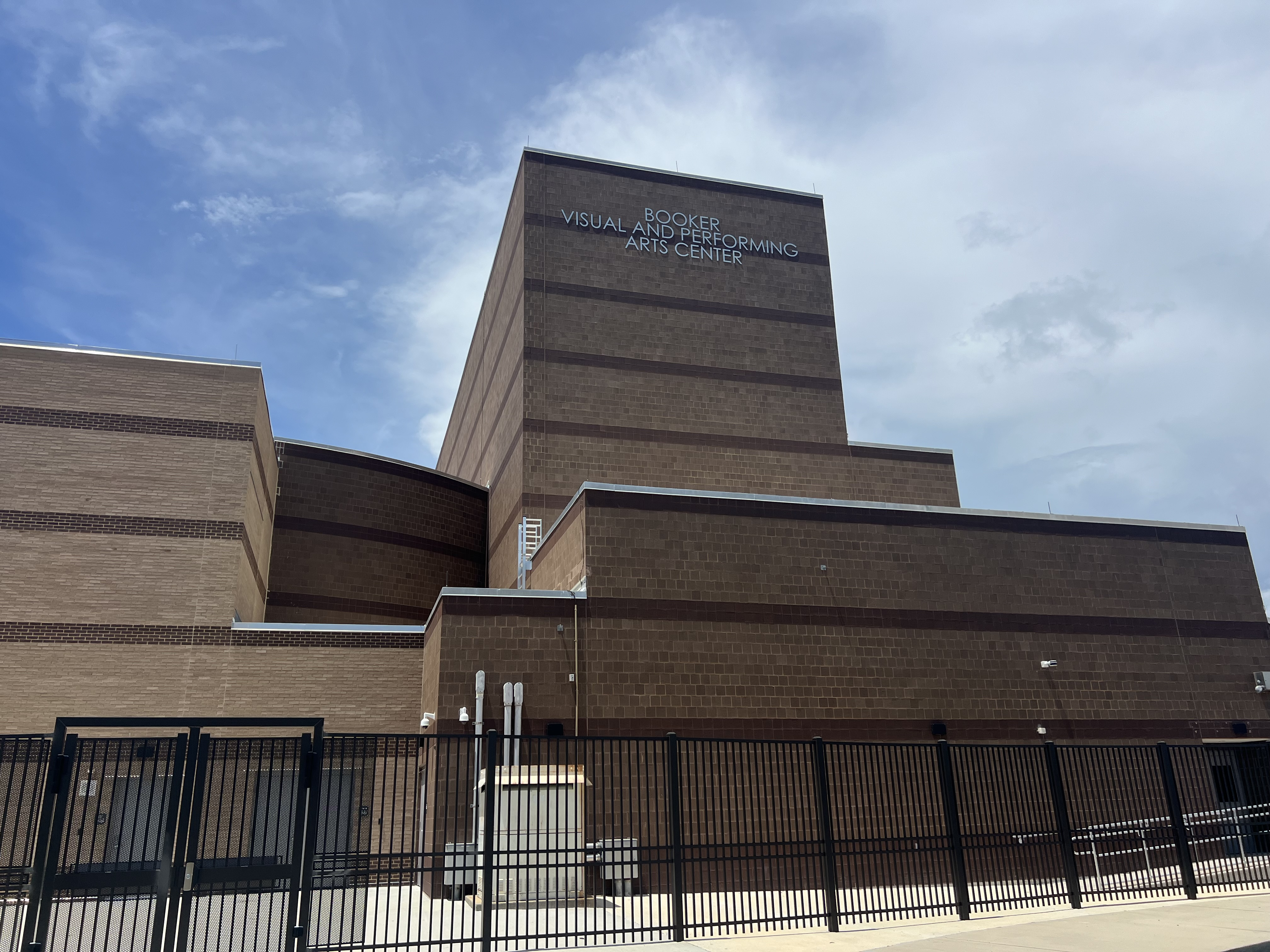

Location
- 3201 North Orange Avenue; Sarasota, Florida 34234-4793; United States; 27.363867°N 82.538744°W

Information
- Type: High school
- Motto: "Celebrating Excellence, Creating Pride."
- School district: Sarasota County Schools
- Principal: Rachel Shelley
- Staff: 73.05 (FTE)
- Grades: 9–12
- Enrollment: 1,395 (2023–2024)
- Student to teacher ratio: 19.10
- Colors: Purple; Gold
- Team name: Tornadoes
- Website: Booker High Home Page

Booker High School is a public high school in north Sarasota, Florida, United States. It is part of the Sarasota County Public Schools district. Its athletic teams are known as the Tornadoes. The school was established to serve a predominantly African American community.

== History ==
Booker High School is named after a teacher and educational leader in Sarasota's black community, Emma Edwina Booker. Booker moved to Sarasota in 1910 and soon helped start Sarasota Grammar School, for the education of young black children. In 1925 she led a procession of students and teachers from the old school (in Knights of Pythias Hall) to a new school built next to the railroad tracks at Lemon and Thirteenth Street (now Seventh Street) by the Rosenwald Fund. Booker served as an inspiration to many of her students and was eventually commemorated by having three schools named in her honor: Emma E. Booker Elementary, Booker Middle School, and Booker High School.

The school expanded to include a high school, which graduated its first class in 1935, and in 1939 was relocated to Orange Avenue in the Newtown neighborhood of north Sarasota; in the 1940s the grammar school was consolidated there as well.

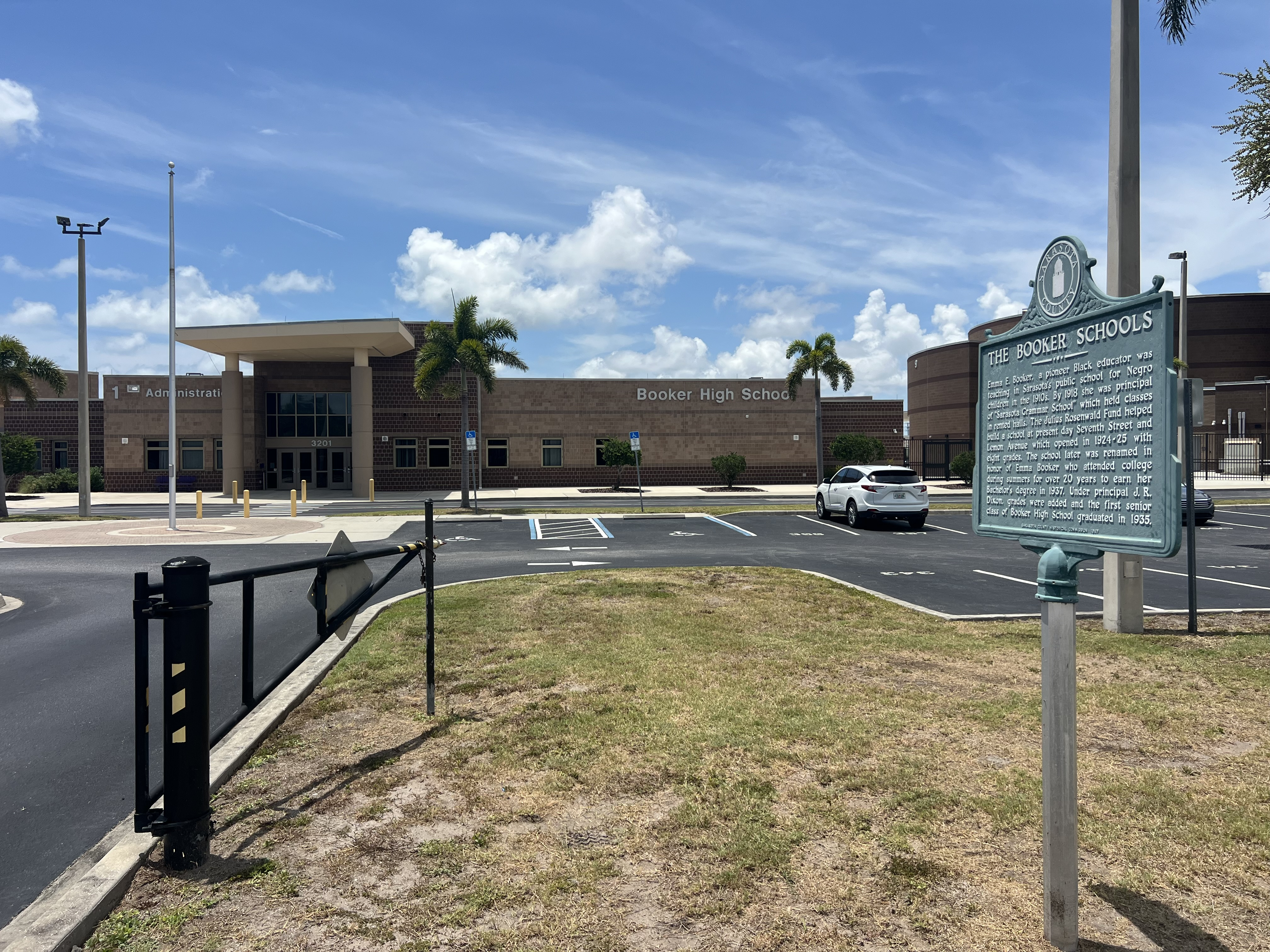
Partial view of campus and historical marker

With the advent of school desegregation in the 1960s, proposals arose to close Booker and other traditionally African-American schools and send the students out of the neighborhood to white schools. The school was closed in 1967. The community objected to the negative impact this loss would have on the area, and eventually a boycott took place in spring 1969. Thereafter the schools reopened, but the threat of closure persisted, especially due to low enrollment. In 1979 the school obtained a grant to establish a magnet school in the performing arts with the goal of attracting white students to the school. The elementary and middle schools moved to other locations by 1993. A renovation budgeted at $58 million broke ground in 2011, changing the route of Orange Avenue so that it no longer divided the campus, and providing five new buildings and improved athletic facilities.

== Academic programs ==
Booker High School offers several "Academies" within the school. The school is particularly known for its Visual and Performing Arts (VPA) programs, which currently include art, dance, digital design, music, and theater. The VPA program has turned out students such as Oscar-winning makeup artist Bill Corso and American Idol finalist Syesha Mercado.

Booker has a Junior Reserve Officers' Training Corps program, with the goals of teaching its cadets to appreciate the ethical values that underlie good citizenship, to develop leadership potential, and to live and work cooperatively with others, and of instilling military conduct principles in students.

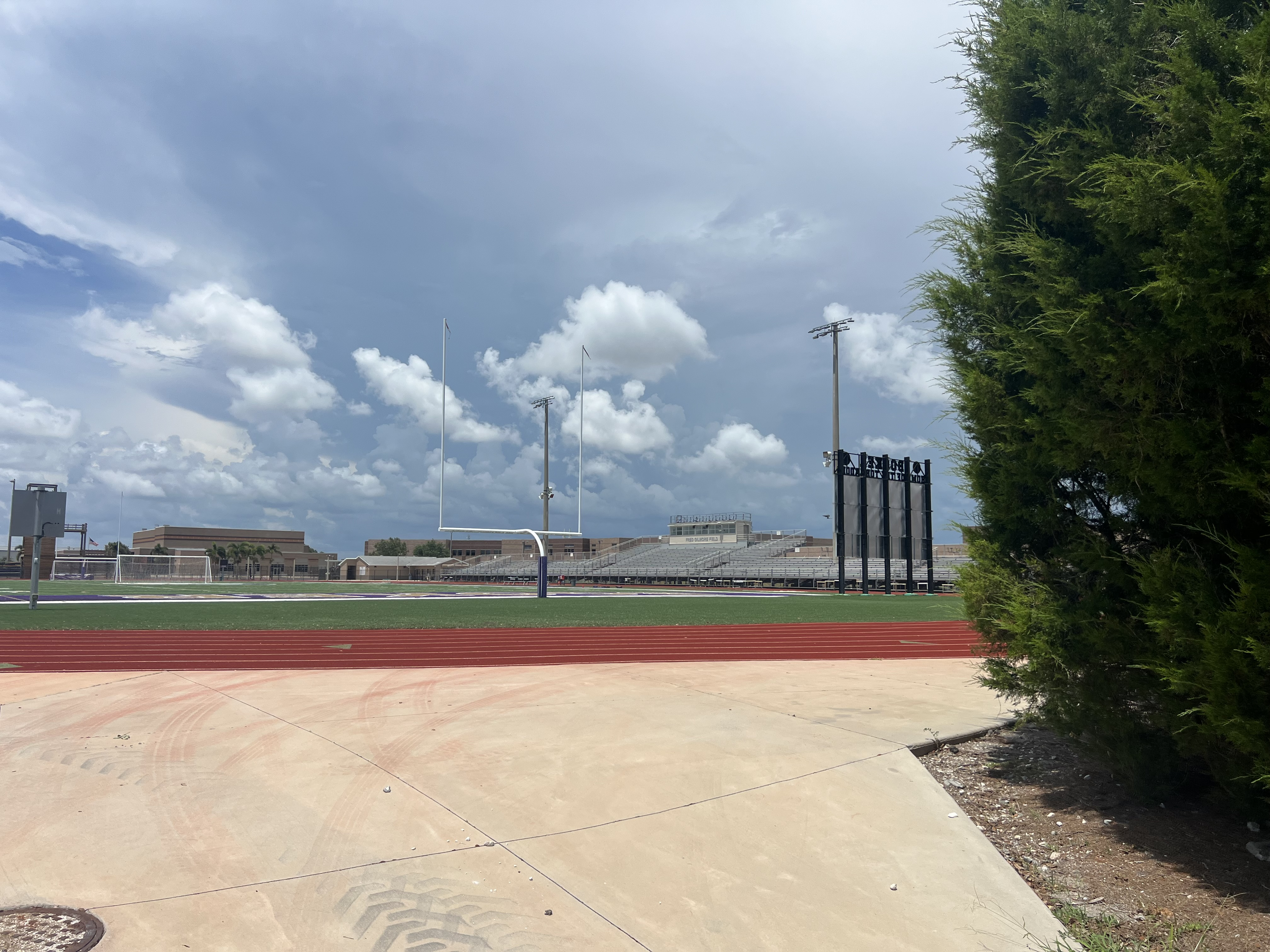
Athletic fields

Booker's boys' basketball team has won four Florida High School Athletic Association championships and a Florida Interscholastic Athletic Association championship.

== Demographics ==
Booker HS is 34% Hispanic, 31% white, 29% black, 1% Asian, 4% multiracial, and 1% other.

== Notable alumni ==
- Paulo Antunes, color commentator for football at ESPN Brazil
- Baraka Atkins, NFL linebacker
- Charlie Barnett, actor on NBC's Chicago Fire and Netflix's Russian Doll
- Jeremy Butler, NFL wide receiver
- Bill Corso, Academy Award-winning makeup artist
- Glen Gauntt, American football player
- Justin Hamilton, Florida's Class 4A boys' basketball player of the year as a senior in 1999, now plays professionally in Europe
- Michael Seneca Hawthorne, NFL cornerback for the New Orleans Saints and Green Bay Packers
- Marquis Johnson, NFL cornerback for St. Louis Rams and New Orleans Saints
- Marlon Mack, NFL running back for the Indianapolis Colts
- Jeff Meacham, actor on ABC’s Black-ish
- Syesha Mercado, musical performer, contestant on American Idol
- Darren Ritchie, Broadway actor
- Sam Shields, NFL cornerback for the Green Bay Packers
- Ruby G. Woodson, educator, founder of two private institutions for gifted minority students
