= Chris Brown (defensive back, born 1978) =

American football player (born 1978)

No. 31
- Position: Defensive back

Personal information
- Born: May 9, 1978 (age 48); Atlanta, Georgia, U.S.
- Listed height: 6 ft 1 in (1.85 m)
- Listed weight: 195 lb (88 kg)

Career information
- High school: Avondale (DeKalb County, Georgia)
- College: UAB (1998–2002)
- NFL draft: 2003: undrafted

Career history
- Jacksonville Jaguars (2003–2004); → Frankfurt Galaxy (2004); Georgia Force (2006); New Orleans VooDoo (2007–2008)

Awards and highlights
- First-team All-C-USA (2002)

Career NFL statistics
- Games played: 4
- Tackles: 2
- Stats at Pro Football Reference
- Stats at ArenaFan.com

Christopher Dannell Brown (born May 9, 1978) is an American former professional football defensive back who played in the National Football League (NFL) for the Jacksonville Jaguars. He played college football for the UAB Blazers. Brown also had a stint in NFL Europe with the Frankfurt Galaxy and Arena Football League (AFL) with the Georgia Force and New Orleans VooDoo.

== Early life ==
Brown was born on May 9, 1978, in Atlanta, Georgia. He attended Avondale High School in DeKalb County, Georgia. Brown also played basketball and track where he was the long jump state champion as a senior.

== College career ==
Brown played college football for the UAB Blazers from 1998 to 2002. He was a four-year letterman from 1999 to 2002. In 45 games, Brown had nine interceptions for 49 yards, one punt return touchdown and two fumble return touchdowns. In 2002, he earned first-team All-C-USA honors.

== Professional career ==
Pre-draft measurables
Height	Weight	Arm length	Hand span	40-yard dash	10-yard split	20-yard split	20-yard shuttle	Three-cone drill	Vertical jump	Broad jump	Bench press
6 ft 0 in (1.83 m)	195 lb (88 kg)	31 1/4 in (0.79 m)	8 7/8 in (0.23 m)	4.61 s	1.56 s	2.67 s	4.13 s	7.05 s	35 1/2 in (0.90 m)	10 ft 6 in (3.20 m)	15 reps
All values from NFL Combine/Pro day

=== Jacksonville Jaguars ===
After going undrafted in the 2003 NFL draft, Brown signed with the Jacksonville Jaguars as an undrafted free agent. On August 31, he was released by the team and signed to the practice squad the following day. On October 8, Brown was elevated to the active roster. He played in four games and made two tackles. On November 11, he was waived by the team and signed to the practice squad on November 13. On December 31, he signed a contract extension for the 2004 season. On August 2, 2004, Brown was released by the team.

=== Frankfurt Galaxy ===
On January 27, 2004, Brown was allocated to the Frankfurt Galaxy of NFL Europe. He played and started in 10 games, where he had 55 tackles, three pass break ups and one forced fumble.

=== Georgia Force ===
In 2006, Brown played for the Georgia Force of the Arena Football League (AFL). He had 107 solo and 34 assisted tackles, ten pass break ups, one forced fumble, four interceptions and three touchdowns.

=== New Orleans VooDoo ===
In 2007, Brown signed with the New Orleans VooDoo of the AFL. He played for two seasons and made 88 solo and seven assisted tackles, ten pass deflections, one fumble recovery, block and interception. Brown also return five kicks for 15 yards and a touchdown.
