= Jarrick Hillery =

American football player (born 1976)

No. 1
- Positions: Wide receiver, defensive back

Personal information
- Born: March 26, 1976; Brunswick, Georgia, U.S.
- Died: November 15, 2022 (aged 46); Smyrna, Georgia, U.S.
- Listed height: 5 ft 10 in (1.78 m)
- Listed weight: 200 lb (91 kg)

Career information
- College: Tennessee State

Career history
- Nashville Kats (2000–2001); Georgia Force (2002–2003); Carolina Cobras (2004); Nashville Kats (2005–2006); Georgia Force (2007)

Awards and highlights
- First-team All-Arena (2001); All-Ironman Team (2001); All-Rookie Team (2000)

Career AFL statistics
- Receptions: 298
- Receiving yards: 3,146
- Tackles: 271
- Interceptions: 11
- Total TDs: 95
- Stats at ArenaFan.com

Jarrick Hillery (March 29, 1976 – November 15, 2022) was an American professional football wide receiver who played eight seasons in the Arena Football League with the Nashville Kats, Georgia Force and Carolina Cobras. He played college football at Tennessee State University.

== College career ==
Hillery played college football for the Tennessee State Tigers. He was a first-team All-Ohio Valley Conference selection his senior year and helped the Tigers to a conference title in 1998. He was also named OVC Specialist of the Week twice his senior year.

== Professional career ==
Hillery played for the Nashville Kats from 2000 to 2001, earning first-team All-Arena in 2001.

Hillery played for the Georgia Force from 2002 to 2003.

Hillery signed with the Carolina Cobras on October 29, 2003. He played for the team during the 2004 season.

Hillery was signed by the Kats on October 11, 2004. He played for the Kats from 2005 to 2006.

Hillery signed with the Force on January 19, 2007. He played for the Force during the 2007 season.

== Personal life ==
Hillery died on November 15, 2022.
