= Nelson Garner =

American football player (born 1976)

Profile
- Position: Placekicker

Personal information
- Born: February 23, 1976 (age 50); Burlington, North Carolina, U.S.
- Listed height: 6 ft 1 in (1.85 m)
- Listed weight: 180 lb (82 kg)

Career information
- College: James Madison
- NFL draft: 1998: undrafted

Career history
- Baltimore Ravens (1998–1999)*; Edmonton Eskimos (1999)*; Albany / Indiana Firebirds (2000–2002); Arizona Rattlers (2003–2004); Georgia Force (2005–2006)
- * Offseason or practice squad member only
- Stats at ArenaFan.com

Nelson Garner (born 1976-02-23) is an American former football placekicker. He spent time in the Arena Football League with the Albany/Indiana Firebirds (2000–2002), the Arizona Rattlers (2003–2004), and the Georgia Force (2005–2006).

He tried out for the Baltimore Ravens in 1998 and 1999.

== College career ==
While attending James Madison University, Garner competed at both, kicker and punter. He was a three-time All-Conference selection, was named the Special Teams MVP as a junior, and as a senior, played in the Blue–Gray Football Classic.
