= Baraka Atkins =

American football player (born 1984)

No. 98, 91, 59
- Position: Linebacker

Personal information
- Born: September 28, 1984 (age 42); Sarasota, Florida, U.S.
- Listed height: 6 ft 5 in (1.96 m)
- Listed weight: 265 lb (120 kg)

Career information
- High school: Booker (Sarasota, Florida)
- College: Miami (FL)
- NFL draft: 2007: 4th round, 120th overall pick

Career history
- Seattle Seahawks (2007−2008); San Francisco 49ers (2009); Denver Broncos (2010)*; Pittsburgh Steelers (2011)*; Dallas Cowboys (2012)*; New Orleans Saints (2013)*
- * Offseason or practice squad member only

Awards and highlights
- Freshman All-American (2003)

Career NFL statistics
- Total tackles: 30
- Sacks: 2
- Fumble recoveries: 2
- Stats at Pro Football Reference

Baraka Atkins (born September 28, 1984) is an American former professional football player who was a linebacker for the New Orleans Saints of the National Football League (NFL). He was drafted by the Seattle Seahawks in the fourth round of the 2007 NFL draft. He played college football for the Miami Hurricanes.

Atkins has also played for the San Francisco 49ers, Denver Broncos, Pittsburgh Steelers, and Dallas Cowboys.

== Early life ==
Atkins attended Booker High School in Sarasota, Florida, where he played mainly strongside defensive end in high school. He was First-team Class 3A all-state selection as a senior, when he recorded 78 tackles and 25 sacks, forced four fumbles, recovered four fumbles (returned one for a touchdown). As a junior, returned a blocked punt for a touchdown, adding 79 tackles and eight sacks. He also lettered in track and basketball.

== College career ==
At the University of Miami he split time between defensive tackle and end. He played in 49 games, starting 45 times and registered 175 tackles (84 solos), 18 sacks and 29.5 stops for loss and 52 quarterback pressures and nine pass deflections, recovered three fumbles, including one for a touchdown and caused five fumbles.

In 2006 as a senior he was honorable mention All-Atlantic Coast Conference after starting 10 games at left defensive end and recorded 49 tackles (22 solos) with four sacks, nine stops for losses and eleven quarterback pressures and recovered a pair of fumbles and deflected two passes. In 2005 as a junior he was a starting defensive tackle playing in all 12 games (11 starts). He finished the season with 50 tackles (25 solo), five tackles for loss, 2.5 sacks, three pass breakups and six QB pressures.

In 2004, he started all 12 games at both defensive end and defensive tackle and made 33 total tackles (15 solo), including nine tackles for a loss and 6.5 sacks, forced two fumbles, one of which he returned for a touchdown. He added one pass breakup and had a team-high 19 QB pressures and was voted honorable mention All-ACC. In 2003, he started 12 of the team's 13 games and was Third-team Freshman All-America honors by The Sporting News. He recorded 43 total tackles (22 solo), including 6.5 tackles for a loss, and five sacks and registered a team-high three forced fumbles and was responsible for 16 quarterback hurries. In 2002, he sat out the year with a redshirt season.

== Professional career ==
=== Pre-draft ===
Pre-draft measurables
Height	Weight	40-yard dash	Vertical jump	Broad jump	Bench press
6 ft 4 1/2 in (1.94 m)	271 lb (123 kg)	4.69 s	33 in (0.84 m)	9 ft 3 in (2.82 m)	22 reps
All values from NFL Combine.

=== Seattle Seahawks ===
Atkins was drafted in the fourth round of the 2007 NFL draft by the Seattle Seahawks. As a rookie in 2007, Atkins played in 12 games and made 5 tackles. In 2008, he played in 9 games and recorded his first two sacks in the NFL. On August 31, 2009, Atkins was released by Seattle for the final 53 man roster.

=== San Francisco 49ers ===
Atkins was signed by the San Francisco 49ers on December 9, 2009, after defensive end Kentwan Balmer was placed on injured reserve. The 49ers waived Atkins on December 22.

=== Denver Broncos ===
Atkins was signed by the Denver Broncos on January 9, 2010

=== Pittsburgh Steelers ===
Atkins was signed by the Pittsburgh Steelers on January 11, 2011. He was released during final cuts on September 4, 2011.

=== Dallas Cowboys ===
Atkins was signed to a futures contract by the Dallas Cowboys on January 11, 2012. He was released on August 31, 2012.

=== New Orleans Saints ===
Atkins was signed by the New Orleans Saints on May 13, 2013. And on August 31, 2013, He was released
