= Dary Myricks =

American football player and coach (born 1976)

No. 56, 54
- Position: Offensive lineman/Defensive lineman

Personal information
- Born: September 27, 1976 (age 50); Jackson, Georgia, U.S.
- Listed height: 6 ft 4 in (1.93 m)
- Listed weight: 270 lb (122 kg)

Career information
- High school: Jackson
- College: The Citadel (1995–1998)
- NFL draft: 1999: undrafted

Career history
- Jacksonville Jaguars (1999)*; Carolina Cobras (2000–2002); Detroit Fury (2003); Georgia Force (2004–2006)
- * Offseason or practice squad member only
- Stats at ArenaFan.com

Dary Myricks (born September 27, 1976) is an American former professional football offensive lineman/defensive lineman who played in the Arena Football League for the Carolina Cobras, Detroit Fury, and Georgia Force. Myricks became the head football coach for his alma mater, Jackson High, in 2013.

== Early life ==
Myricks attended Jackson High School in Jackson, Georgia and lettered four times in football and three times in basketball. In football, he was a McDonald's All-America honoree and played in the North-South All-Star Game.

== College career ==
Myricks attended The Citadel, and was a four-year letterman. He finished his career with 178 tackles and six sacks, and as a senior, he won first team All-Southern Conference honors.

After completing a successful career in the Arena Football League, Mr. Myricks now works as a high school graduation specialist at Jackson High School, where he coaches football and is the head basketball coach.
