= Doug Plank =

American football player and coach (born 1953)

No. 46
- Position: Safety

Personal information
- Born: March 4, 1953 (age 73); Greensburg, Pennsylvania, U.S.
- Listed height: 6 ft 0 in (1.83 m)
- Listed weight: 200 lb (91 kg)

Career information
- High school: Norwin (North Huntingdon, Pennsylvania)
- College: Ohio State (1971–1974)
- NFL draft: 1975: 12th round, 291st overall pick

Career history

Playing
- Chicago Bears (1975–1982); Chicago Blitz (1984)

Coaching
- Georgia Force (2001–2003) Head coach; Arizona Rattlers (2005–2008) Defensive coordinator; Atlanta Falcons (2008) Assistant head coach; New York Jets (2009) Defensive backs assistant; Ohio State (2010) Program assistant; Philadelphia Soul (2012) Head coach; Orlando Predators (2013) Head coach

Awards and highlights
- 100 greatest Bears of All-Time; 2× AFL Coach of the Year (2005, 2007)

Career NFL statistics
- Interceptions: 15
- Interception yards: 166
- Fumble recoveries: 14
- Safeties: 1
- Stats at Pro Football Reference

Head coaching record
- Regular season: 65–35 (.650)
- Postseason: 6–6 (.500)
- Career: 71–41 (.634)

Douglas Walter Plank (born March 4, 1953) is an American former professional football player and coach. He played as a safety for the Chicago Bears of the National Football League (NFL) and also played one year in the United States Football League (USFL) for the Chicago Blitz. He played college football for the Ohio State Buckeyes football winning 3 Big Ten Championships and played in three Rose Bowls.

== Early life ==
Plank attended Norwin High School in North Huntingdon, Pennsylvania, where he played baseball, basketball, and football. His high school baseball batting average of .526 stood as a school record for over thirty years. Following his senior football season, Plank was voted MVP of the WPIAL’s Foothills Conference.

He then played football for The Ohio State University, winning three Big Ten titles and participating in three consecutive Rose Bowls under legendary coach Woody Hayes. Plank played a reserve role at Ohio State starting only five games, playing mostly on special teams. One of those starts came against Northwestern his senior year in Chicago, where he was seen by a Chicago Bear scout.

== NFL playing career ==
The 46 defense that was named after Plank's jersey number

In 1975, Plank was drafted 291st overall by the Chicago Bears in the 12th round. He is credited with 30 turnovers in his 8 years. He spent his entire eight-year NFL playing career with the Bears. He became an instant starter with the Bears and was the first Bears rookie to lead the Bears in tackles. Plank was an aggressive and a capable tackler, Buddy Ryan created a defense with Plank at the middle linebacker position. In meetings, Ryan always called players by their number and not their name. Several players had coverages and blitzes named after their jersey number. It was Ryan's way of coaching football as objective and not personal. Ryan created the "46 Defense" put great pressure on the quarterback with 6 defensive lineman and a large inventory of blitzes with physical safeties that could cover receivers and stop the running game. The Bears used the "46" Defense in 1985 to dominate the New England Patriots on their way to a Super Bowl victory of 46-10 despite the retirement of Plank in 1983.

Plank was considered one of the hardest hitting safeties in the game. Plank retired before the Bears reached their peak in 1985. Plank and Gary Fencik were dubbed "The Hit Men", a fact referenced by Fencik in 1985's The Super Bowl Shuffle.

In 1984, Plank played one season in the USFL for the Chicago Blitz before retiring.

== After football ==
After football, Plank became a franchisee of Burger King Corporation. He operated a total of twenty individual restaurants in three states over a twenty-year period.

In 1995, Plank began working as a football analyst and has done work for Fox Sports, the Arizona Cardinals, the Arizona State Sun Devils, the University of Arizona Wildcats, and the Arizona Rattlers. In 1996, a Bears fan "Bearman" became the unofficial mascot of the Bears, and he wore Plank's Number 46 jersey.

From 2010 to 2023, Plank worked as a football color analyst for NFL and NCAA football on national radio broadcasts for Sports USA Media.

He was a licensed realtor in Arizona, a licensed health license salesperson, licensed life insurance salesperson, and real estate investor in Arizona. He was also an investor for the McRae Group, which improves property through the entitlement process for future development.

Plank is an example of emphasizing the value of hard work, making wise decisions in one's personal life and working with competent partners for success.

== Coaching career ==
In 2001, Plank began his coaching career as a defensive coordinator in the Arena Football League for three seasons under former Dallas quarterback Danny White. In those three seasons, the Arizona Rattlers played in three consecutive Arenabowls.

In 2004, Plank was hired by Arthur Blank to be head coach of the Georgia Force, an arena football team he owned in addition to the Atlanta Falcons. He was named the AFL's Coach of the Year in 2005 and 2007, leading Georgia to the playoffs in every season and in his first year, ArenaBowl XIX in 2005. In Plank's first four years as an AFL head coach, he won more games in that period than any other coach in the history of the AFL.

In 2008, he was a seasonal assistant on the Atlanta Falcons staff. The Falcons played in the wild-card round of the NFL playoffs. In 2009, he served as the assistant defensive backfield coach for the New York Jets under head coach Rex Ryan, the son of Plank's former defensive coordinator, Buddy Ryan. The 2009 Jets defense led the NFL in fewest total yards allowed, fewest points allowed, and fewest TD passes allowed. The Jets played in the AFC championship game versus the Colts.

In 2010, Plank became a football program assistant at Ohio State. The Buckeyes earned a share of the Big 10 title with an 11–1 record and beat Arkansas in the Sugar Bowl.

On August 31, 2011, Plank became head coach of the AFL's Philadelphia Soul. In his first year, the Soul compiled a regular season record of 15–3 after going 6–12 the previous year. The Soul played in ArenaBowl XXV versus the Arizona Rattlers. The Soul established new franchise records in wins, scoring, rushing, and defensive takeaways in 2012.

On September 5, 2012, Plank became head coach of the 4-14 Orlando Predators of the AFL. After losing the first five games of the 2013 season, Orlando rebounded to make the playoffs before losing in the first round and subsequently retiring.

== Head coaching record ==
Team	Year	Regular season				Postseason			
Team	Year	Won	Lost	Win %	Finish	Won	Lost	Win %	Result
GEO	2005	11	5	.688	1st in NC South	2	1	.667	Lost to Colorado Crush in ArenaBowl XIX
GEO	2006	8	8	.500	3rd in NC South	1	1	.500	Lost to Dallas Desperados in NC Divisional Round
GEO	2007	14	2	.875	1st in NC South	1	1	.500	Lost to Columbus Destroyers in NC Championship
GEO	2008	10	6	.625	1st in NC South	0	1	.000	Lost to Cleveland Gladiators in NC Divisional Round
GEO total		43	21	.672		4	4	.500	–
PHI	2012	15	3	.833	1st in AC East	2	1	.667	Lost to Arizona Rattlers in ArenaBowl XXV
ORL	2013	7	11	.389	2nd in AC South	0	1	.000	Lost to Philadelphia Soul in AC Conference Semifinals
Total		65	35	.650		6	6	.500	–
