= James Clark (American football) =

American football player (1904–1977)

No. 27
- Position: Back

Personal information
- Born: August 18, 1904; Greensburg, Pennsylvania, U.S.
- Died: May 26, 1977 (aged 72); Greensburg, Pennysylvania, U.S.
- Listed height: 5 ft 9 in (1.75 m)
- Listed weight: 170 lb (77 kg)

Career information
- High school: The Kiski School (Saltsburg, Pennsylvania)
- College: Pittsburgh (1928–1931)

Career history
- Pittsburgh Pirates (1933–1934)

Career statistics
- Rushing attempts: 107
- Rushing yards: 276
- Games played: 19
- Stats at Pro Football Reference

James L. Clark (August 18, 1904 – May 26, 1977) was an American professional football player who played two seasons in the National Football League (NFL) with the Pittsburgh Pirates. He played college football at the University of Pittsburgh.

== Early life and college ==
James L. Clark was born on August 18, 1904, in Greensburg, Pennsylvania. He attended Greensburg High School in Greensburg before transferring to The Kiski School in Saltsburg, Pennsylvania.

He was a member of the Pittsburgh Panthers football team from 1928 to 1931 and a three-year letterman from 1929 to 1931.

== Professional career ==
Clark signed with the Pittsburgh Pirates (now Steelers) of the National Football League (NFL) in 1933. He played in ten games, starting five, for the Pirates during the team's inaugural season in 1933, rushing 76 times for 192 yards. He appeared in nine games, starting three, in 1934, recording 31 carries for 84 yards while also catching one pass for a 28-yard touchdown. Clark became a free agent after the 1934 season.

== Personal life ==
Clark died on May 26, 1977, in Greensburg, Pennsylvania.
