= Robert Thomas (fullback) =

American football player (born 1974)

No. 59, 44
- Positions: Fullback, linebacker

Personal information
- Born: December 1, 1974 (age 51); Jacksonville, Arkansas, U.S.
- Listed height: 6 ft 1 in (1.85 m)
- Listed weight: 273 lb (124 kg)

Career information
- High school: Jacksonville
- College: Henderson State
- NFL draft: 1998: undrafted

Career history

Playing
- Calgary Stampeders (1998)*; Dallas Cowboys (1998–2002); → Rhein Fire (1999); Georgia Force (2004–2006); Colorado Crush (2007–2008)
- * Offseason or practice squad member only

Coaching
- Arkansas Twisters (2009) Assistant coach

Awards and highlights
- AFL All-Ironman Team - FB/LB (2007); AFL All-Rookie Team - FB/LB (2004); GSC Defensive Player of Year (1995); All-GSC (1995, 1996)

Career NFL statistics
- Rushing yards: 157
- Rushing average: 4
- Receptions: 50
- Receiving yards: 280
- Touchdowns: 3
- Stats at Pro Football Reference

Career AFL statistics
- Rushing yards: 556
- Receptions: 35
- Receiving yards: 327
- Total touchdowns: 46
- Stats at ArenaFan.com

Robert Lee Thomas, IV (born December 1, 1974) is an American former professional football player who was a fullback in the National Football League (NFL) for the Dallas Cowboys. He played college football for the Henderson State Reddies.

== Early life ==
Thomas graduated from Jacksonville High School in Jacksonville, Arkansas, after playing three seasons of football. Back then because of his small size, he played different positions (fullback, tight end, linebacker, defensive end, punter and quarterback).

He attended college at Henderson State University in Arkadelphia, Arkansas, where he became the starting middle linebacker. He closed out his collegiate career as the school's all-time leading tackler with 388 tackles. Among his marks, he recorded 18 tackles in a single game and 129 tackles in a season. He was named the Gulf South Conference Defensive Player of Year in 1995 and earned All-GSC honors in 1995 and 1996.

In 1996, Thomas participated in the NCAA Division II All-Star game and the Snow Bowl (later known as the Cactus Bowl). He also was a finalist for the Harlon Hill Trophy.

In 2004, he was inducted into the Henderson State University Hall of Honor. In 2006, he was inducted into the Jacksonville High School Hall of Fame.

== Professional career ==
=== Calgary Stampeders ===
In 1998, he signed as a free agent with the Calgary Stampeders of the CFL, but only played in one pre-season game before being waived.

=== Dallas Cowboys ===
Thomas was not selected in the 1998 NFL draft and was signed as an undrafted free agent by the Dallas Cowboys. He made the Cowboys' final roster and spent his time playing mostly on special teams.

In 1999, he was allocated to NFL Europe's Rhein Fire and upon his return he was switched from linebacker to fullback, becoming a starter that same season, after Daryl Johnston suffered a career-ending neck injury.

As a starter, he became a productive player, earning a new three-year contract in 2001. During that season, he would miss the final 11 games after suffering torn ligaments in his left ankle and being placed on the injured reserve list.

On February 19, 2003, Thomas was released because of salary cap considerations. During his time with the Cowboys, he served primarily as Emmitt Smith's lead blocker for four of his five seasons, eventually paving the way as Smith ran for 109 yards on 24 carries, while becoming the NFL's all-time leading rusher versus the Seattle Seahawks on October 27, 2002.

=== Arena Football League ===
From 2004 to 2008, he played in the Arena Football League where he broke the Georgia Force’s rushing yds record with 250 yds in a season, and tied their rushing touchdown record with 12. In 2004, his first year with the league, he was named to the All-Rookie team. From 2007 to 2008, he played for the Colorado Crush, where he tied the team's rushing touchdown record (9) and was named to the All-Ironman Team.

== Post-playing career ==
In 2009, Thomas was named an assistant coach for the Arkansas Twisters of the AF2.
