= Umar Muhammad =

American football player (born 1975)

No. 35, 42
- Position: Linebacker

Personal information
- Born: July 25, 1975 (age 51)
- Listed height: 5 ft 11 in (1.80 m)
- Listed weight: 257 lb (117 kg)

Career information
- College: North Texas

Career history
- Albany/Indiana Firebirds (2000–2002); Grand Rapids Rampage (2003); Georgia Force (2003)*; Tampa Bay Storm (2004–2006); Georgia Force (2007–2008); New Orleans VooDoo (2008)
- * Offseason or practice squad member only

Awards and highlights
- Second-team All-Arena (2007)

Career AFL statistics
- Tackles: 125.5
- Sacks: 14
- Forced fumbles: 3
- Rushing yards: 160
- Rushing TDs: 19
- Stats at ArenaFan.com

Umar Muhammad (born July 25, 1975) is an American former professional football linebacker who played nine seasons in the Arena Football League (AFL) with the Albany/Indiana Firebirds, Grand Rapids Rampage, Tampa Bay Storm, Georgia Force and New Orleans VooDoo. He played college football at the University of North Texas.

== Early life ==
Umar Muhammad was born on July 25, 1975. He played college football for the North Texas Mean Green of the University of North Texas.

== Professional career ==
Muhammad played for the Albany/Indiana Firebirds from 2000 to 2002. Muhammad was re-signed on March 21, 2002. He was released by the Firebirds on February 1, 2003.

Muhammad signed with the Grand Rapids Rampage on February 13, 2003.

Muhammad was signed by the Georgia Force on November 13, 2003. He was released by the Force on December 3, 2003.

Muhammad signed with the Tampa Bay Storm on April 9, 2004. He played for the team from 2004 to 2006.

Muhammad played for the Force during the 2007 season, earning second-team All-Arena honors. He was released by the Force on January 22, 2008.

Muhammad was signed by the New Orleans VooDoo on January 29, 2008.
