= Shane Grice =

American football player (born 1976)

No. 68
- Positions: Offensive guard, tight end

Personal information
- Born: December 20, 1976 (age 49); Tupelo, Mississippi, U.S.
- Listed height: 6 ft 1 in (1.85 m)
- Listed weight: 307 lb (139 kg)

Career information
- High school: Shannon (MS)
- College: Itawamba CC; Ole Miss
- NFL draft: 2001: undrafted

Career history
- Tampa Bay Buccaneers (2001)*; Chicago Bears (2001)*; Tampa Bay Buccaneers (2001); Chicago Bears (2002)*; Barcelona Dragons (2003); Chicago Bears (2003)*; Georgia Force (2004–2008)
- * Offseason or practice squad member only

Awards and highlights
- Second-team All-Arena (2008)

Career NFL statistics
- Games played: 1
- Stats at Pro Football Reference

Career AFL statistics
- Receptions: 7
- Receiving yards: 39
- Touchdowns: 1
- Tackles: 15
- Stats at ArenaFan.com

Shane Grice (born December 20, 1976) is an American former professional football player who was a guard and tight end for one game in the National Football League (NFL) with the Tampa Bay Buccaneers and five seasons in the Arena Football League (AFL) for the Georgia Force. He played college football for the Ole Miss Rebels.

== Early life and education ==
Shane Grice was born on December 20, 1976, in Tupelo, Mississippi. He attended Shannon High School, graduating in c. 1997, before joining the Itawamba Community College, where he played one season in football. In 1998, he transferred to the University of Mississippi, where he played three seasons for their Ole Miss Rebels football team. Grice was a starter in 26 games for the Rebels, and helped them have the seventh-fewest sacks given up in the nation as a senior.

== Professional career ==
After going unselected in the 2001 NFL draft, Grice was signed by the Tampa Bay Buccaneers as an undrafted free agent. He was released at the final roster cuts on August 27.

Grice was later signed to the practice squad of the Chicago Bears, before being re-signed to the active roster by the Buccaneers on September 26. He spent seven games on the inactive list before being released. Grice was later signed to the Buccaneers practice squad, before being promoted to the active roster for the season finale against the Philadelphia Eagles. He made his NFL debut in the game. He was released by the Buccaneers after the third preseason game in August 2002.

Near the end of the 2002 season, Grice was signed to the practice squad of the Chicago Bears, but did not appear in any games.

In 2003, Grice was sent to the Barcelona Dragons of NFL Europe, where he appeared in ten games, nine as a starter. He returned to the Bears following the NFL Europe season end, but did not make the final roster.

In 2004, Grice was signed by the Georgia Force of the Arena Football League (AFL). In his first season with the team, he appeared in all 11 games, making 9.5 tackles, a sack, and a fumble recovery. He was also used as a tight end, and made one catch for six yards. He ended up playing five seasons with the Force, earning second-team All-Arena honors in 2008, his last season, after starting all 16 games. He finished his career with seven catches for 39 yards and a touchdown on offense, and 15 tackles on defense.
