= Marcus Keyes =

American football player (born 1973)

No. 73
- Position: Offensive lineman

Personal information
- Born: October 20, 1973 (age 53); Taylorsville, Mississippi, U.S.
- Listed height: 6 ft 3 in (1.91 m)
- Listed weight: 280 lb (127 kg)

Career information
- High school: Taylorsville
- College: North Alabama
- NFL draft: 1996: 7th round, 233rd overall pick

Career history
- Chicago Bears (1996–1997); Florida Bobcats (2001); Georgia Force (2002)*; Carolina Cobras (2002); Georgia Force (2002–2007); Grand Rapids Rampage (2007–2008)
- * Offseason or practice squad member only

Awards and highlights
- 3× NCAA Division II national champion (1993–1995); Second-team All-Arena (2007)

Career AFL statistics
- Tackles: 69.5
- Sacks: 4.5
- Forced fumbles: 3
- Interceptions: 1
- Pass breakups: 2
- Stats at ArenaFan.com
- Stats at Pro Football Reference

Willis Marcus Keyes (born October 20, 1973) is an American former professional football offensive lineman who played eight seasons in the Arena Football League (AFL) with the Florida Bobcats, Carolina Cobras and Georgia Force. He was selected by the Chicago Bears in the seventh round of the 1996 NFL draft. He played college football at the University of North Alabama.

== Early life ==
Keyes attended Taylorsville High School in Taylorsville, Mississippi.

== College career ==
Keyes played college football for the North Alabama Lions. He won three NCAA Division II National Championships during his college career. He also participated in the Senior Bowl and the Blue/Grey game.

== Professional career ==
Keyes was selected by the Chicago Bears with the 233rd pick in the 1996 NFL draft. He was a member of the Bears from 1996 to 1997, appearing in two games during the 1996 season.

Keyes signed with the Florida Bobcats of the Arena Football League (AFL) on March 9, 2001.

Keyes was a member of the AFL's Georgia Force during the 2002 off-season. He was released by the Force on April 15, 2002.

Keyes was signed by the Carolina Cobras of the AFL on April 16, 2002.

Keyes was traded to the Force on October 22, 2002, for the fourth pick in the 2003 Dispersal Draft. He played for the team from 2003 to 2007, earning Second-team All-Arena honors in 2007.

Keyes signed with the Grand Rapids Rampage of the AFL on October 31, 2007, and played for them during the 2008 season. He was released by the Rampage on December 2, 2008.
