= Jermaine Smith =

American football player (born 1972)

Mississippi Delta Trojans
- Title: Head coach

Personal information
- Born: May 23, 1972 (age 54); Augusta, Georgia, U.S.
- Listed height: 6 ft 3 in (1.91 m)
- Listed weight: 290 lb (132 kg)

Career information
- High school: Laney (Augusta)
- College: Georgia
- NFL draft: 1997: 4th round, 126th overall pick

Career history

Playing
- Green Bay Packers (1997–2000); New York/New Jersey Hitmen (2001); Las Vegas Outlaws (2001); Georgia Force (2002–2003); Orlando Predators (2004); Georgia Force (2005–2008); Tampa Bay Storm (2010–2011); San Jose SaberCats (2012); Orlando Predators (2013)

Coaching
- Livingstone (2020) Linebackers coach & assistant special teams coordinator; Fort Lewis (2021–2022) Defensive coordinator; Campbell (2023) Defensive analyst; Minnesota West C&T (2024–2025) Head coach; Mississippi Delta (2026–present) Head coach

Awards and highlights
- 3× First-team All-Arena (2003, 2005, 2006); 3× Second-team All-Arena (2004, 2007, 2010)

Career NFL statistics
- Tackles: 4
- Sacks: 1.5
- Interceptions: 1
- Stats at Pro Football Reference

Career AFL statistics
- Tackles: 130
- Sacks: 49
- Forced fumbles: 8
- Fumble recoveries: 15
- Interceptions: 2
- Stats at ArenaFan.com

Jermaine Smith (born March 23, 1972) is an American junior college football coach and former Arena Football League (AFL) player. He is the head football coach for Mississippi Delta Community College, a position he has held since December 2025. Smith served as the head football coach at Minnesota West Community and Technical College from 2024 to 2025. He went to Laney High School in Augusta, Georgia, where he played defensive tackle as well as fullback. He began his collegiate career at Georgia Military College. After two years, he transferred to the University of Georgia. He was selected in the fourth round of the 1997 NFL draft with the 126th overall pick.

== AFL career ==
Smith has played more regular season games with the Georgia Force (77) than any other player. Jermaine entered the 2008 season ranked 13th all-time in the Arena Football League in sacks.

Smith was picked up by the Tampa Bay Storm prior to the 2010 season of the current incarnation of the AFL.

== Head coaching record ==
Year	Team	Overall	Conference	Standing	Bowl/playoffs
Minnesota West C&T Bluejays (Minnesota College Athletic Conference) (2024–2025)
2024	Minnesota West C&T	1–7	1–5	T–5th	
2025	Minnesota West C&T	5–4	5–2	3rd	L MCAC Semifinal
Minnesota West C&T:		6–11	7-7		
Total:		6–11			
