= Chris Jackson (wide receiver) =

American gridiron football player and coach (born 1975)

Texas Longhorns
- Title: Wide receivers coach

Personal information
- Born: February 26, 1975 (age 51); Bristol, Pennsylvania, U.S.
- Listed height: 6 ft 1 in (1.85 m)
- Listed weight: 200 lb (91 kg)

Career information
- Position: Wide receiver (No. 84, 86, 81)
- High school: Mater Dei (Santa Ana, California)
- College: UC Riverside; Washington State
- NFL draft: 1998: undrafted

Career history

Playing
- Seattle Seahawks (1998)*; Tampa Bay Buccaneers (1998)*; Seattle Seahawks (1999)*; Los Angeles Avengers (2000); Tennessee Titans (2000); Los Angeles Avengers (2001–2002); Green Bay Packers (2002); Los Angeles Avengers (2003); Miami Dolphins (2003)*; Green Bay Packers (2003); Los Angeles Avengers (2004); Grand Rapids Rampage (2005); Georgia Force (2005–2007); Philadelphia Soul (2008); Winnipeg Blue Bombers (2009)*; Arizona Rattlers (2011, 2014)
- * Offseason or practice squad member only

Coaching
- Chicago Bears (2019) Defensive assistant; Chicago Bears (2020–2021) Assistant wide receivers coach; Jacksonville Jaguars (2022) Wide receivers coach; Texas (2023–present) Passing game coordinator & wide receivers coach

Awards and highlights
- 2× ArenaBowl champion (2008, 2014); 2× AFL Offensive Player of the Year (2003, 2008); AFL Rookie of the Year (2000); 3× First-team All-Arena (2003, 2007, 2008); AFL All-Ironman Team (2001)

Career NFL statistics
- Tackles: 1
- Stats at Pro Football Reference

Career AFL statistics
- Receptions: 1,004
- Receiving yards: 13,355
- Touchdowns: 325
- Stats at ArenaFan.com

Christopher Jackson (born February 26, 1975) is an American football coach and former wide receiver. He is currently the wide receivers coach and passing game coordinator for The University of Texas. During the 2022 season, he was the wide receivers coach for the Jacksonville Jaguars of the National Football League (NFL). He previously served as an assistant coach for the Chicago Bears.

Jackson played college football at Orange Coast College before moving onto Washington State Cougars after one year. In both 1996 and 1997, Jackson was a starter for the Cougars and was considered a favorite target of Ryan Leaf. After going undrafted in the 1998 NFL draft signed with the Tampa Bay Buccaneers and spent the season on their practice squad. Following his stint in Tampa Bay he would spend three seasons split with the Seattle Seahawks and Tennessee Titans. In 2000, after his first stint in the NFL was over, Jackson signed with the AFL's Los Angeles Avengers. He spent three seasons with Los Angeles and was named the AFL's Rookie of the Year and totaled 3,255 yards, 238 catches and 67 touchdowns. After the Avengers, Jackson was given another opportunity in the NFL to play for the Green Bay Packers in 2002 and 2003. In his three active seasons in the NFL, he played in one game for the Titans in 2000, and one game each season (2002–03) for the Packers. Following the end of his playing career, Jackson began a career in coaching with the Chicago Bears as a defensive assistant in 2019.

== Early life ==
He attended Mater Dei High School in Santa Ana, California. Jackson played basketball and in track and field as a long jumper and a triple jumper, but did not play football. He played in a state championship basketball game during his time at Mater Dei and ended up losing to a team led by former NBA player Jason Kidd.

== Playing career ==
=== College ===
==== Orange Coast College ====
Jackson attended Orange Coast College for a year and got his first taste of organized football in 1994. He averaged 21.1 yards per reception.

==== Washington State ====
Jackson attended Washington State University in 1996 and 1997 where he was a letterman in football where he was a favorite target of college teammate Ryan Leaf. As a senior, he made 54 receptions for 1,005 yards and eleven touchdowns, and helped in leading his team to the Rose Bowl.

=== National Football League ===
Pre-draft measurables
Height	Weight	Arm length	Hand span	40-yard dash	10-yard split	20-yard split	20-yard shuttle	Vertical jump
6 ft 1 1/8 in (1.86 m)	203 lb (92 kg)	32 1/4 in (0.82 m)	9 5/8 in (0.24 m)	4.67 s	1.65 s	2.73 s	4.10 s	33.5 in (0.85 m)

Jackson was signed as an undrafted free agent by the Tampa Bay Buccaneers and spent part of the year on their practice squad.

On April 28, 1999, he was signed by the Seattle Seahawks. During the 1998 and 1999 season he spent time on the practice roster and was waived on September 6, 1999.

Shortly after his release from the Seahawks, Jackson was signed by the Tennessee Titans. On October 5, 1999, he made his professional debut against the Pittsburgh Steelers but was placed on injured reserve on December 1.

On March 1, 2001, the Titans released Jackson.

=== Arena Football League ===
Jackson was signed by the Los Angeles Avengers before the 2000 Arena Football League season. As a rookie in 2000 he was named Arena Football League Rookie of the Year and made the AFL All-Rookie squad after recording 1,325 receiving yards, 91 receptions, 26 touchdowns and 124.9 all-purpose yards per game. As a rookie, he posted nine 100 yard receiving games.

In 2001, he played in nine games recording 62 catches, 725 yards and 13 touchdowns. He was named the Arena Football League Ironman of the Week after recording 12 receptions for 144 yards and four touchdowns against the Arizona Rattlers. In a game against the Nashville Kats he suffered a stress fracture in his left foot which forced him to miss the final two games of the season.

During the 2002 season he had 85 catches for 1,205 yards and 28 touchdowns after playing in ten games. Against the Dallas Desperados he suffered a broken hand but continued to play and made the game-winning touchdown catch with 13 seconds left to play.

After his failed stint with the Packers, Jackson made a return to the Avengers for the 2003 season. In his fourth year with the team he recorded 117 catches, 1,737 yards and 46 touchdowns and was named the AFL Offensive player of the Year. He became the first player to be named AFL Rookie of the Year and AFL Offensive player of the Year in Arena Football League history.

In 2004, following his fifth failed NFL stint he came back to the Avengers and posted 125 receptions, 1,803 receiving yards and 44 touchdowns. His 125 catches ranked him fourth in that category for the season. After the season, he became a free agent.

As a free agent he signed with the Grand Rapids Rampage but also spent time with the Georgia Force in 2005. He had 107 catches, 1,366 yards, and 29 touchdowns along with 18 rushing yards on five carries with three touchdowns. Against the Austin Wranglers he became the 11th player in AFL history to score 1,000 career points and became the 13th player in history to have 7,000 points and the 15th in history to have 500 catches. The game against the Wranglers was also ironically his debut game with the Force. His performance in the game earned him the AFL Ironman of the game award. He had his second AFL Ironman of the game award come against the Tampa Bay Storm later that year and also earned Player of the Week honors. In the conference championship game against the Orlando Predators he was named U. S. Army Ironman of the game. Against the Predators he had a game-high 147 receiving yards with eight catches and four touchdowns.

Jackson started 14 of 16 games for the Force in 2006 and led the team with 1,468 receiving yards and 36 touchdowns. He returned 57 kickoffs for a total of 1,107 yards with two touchdowns and he returned three missed field goals for 94 yards and a touchdown. Against Orlando he was named Offensive player of the game after recording nine catches for 117 yards with three touchdowns and returning five kickoffs for a total of 77 yards. His second offensive player of the game honor came against the Columbus Destroyers when he had 10 catches, 90 yards and four touchdowns. Against the Tampa Bay Storm he received his third offensive player of the game honor and his second career offensive player of week award by putting up 10 receptions, 124 yards and six touchdowns. Adding to that he had 75 yards on two kickoff returns, one of which he brought back for a touchdown. His offensive explosion set a franchise record for most individual points in a game with 42. Continuing his stellar season he had 126 yards on nine catches with four receiving touchdowns and one rushing touchdown against the Kansas City Brigade. He accumulated 141 yards on seven returns in the same game. His 268 total yards in the game made him second his Force history for yards in a game. The fourth offensive player of the game award came against the Austin Wranglers when he had 12 receptions, 117 yards and one touchdown. Rounding out the 2006 season he had seven catches for 61 yards with one touchdown against the Philadelphia Soul and had five touchdowns, 13 receptions and 180 receiving yards against the New York Dragons. His performance against New York set franchise single-game records in receiving touchdowns, catches and receiving yards.

In 2007, he had 51 total touchdowns and was named to the AFL All-Arena First-team. He rushed for 19 yards on nine attempts with four touchdowns, and had career highs with 1,915 receiving yards, 145 catches and 42 receiving touchdowns. His receiving yards and total touchdowns were second in the league but they were both team highs. He was named offensive player of the game twice against the Wranglers and Storm. Three times he was named Ironman Player of the Game against the Philadelphia Soul, Dallas Desperados and Predators. After the season, he became a free agent.

Jackson signed with the Philadelphia Soul on November 8, 2007.

Jackson helped lead the Philadelphia Soul to a championship in ArenaBowl XXII, with 140 receptions for 1,692 yards and 49 TDs on the year.

On July 8, 2011, Jackson signed with the 14-2 Arizona Rattlers to help them reach ArenaBowl XXIV. In his first game back in the AFL since winning ArenaBowl XXII with the Soul, he caught 6 passes for 78 yards and two touchdowns.

Jackson made a second comeback with the Rattlers in 2014, signing on August 8, 2014, just before the National Conference Championship. The Rattlers reached ArenaBowl XXVII, beating the Cleveland Gladiators 72–32. Jackson scored two touchdowns in ArenaBowl XXVII at age 39.

=== Return to the NFL ===
Jackson signed with the Green Bay Packers on August 1, 2002. Jackson played for two seasons with the Packers (2002–03). He played in one game each season. The Packers won Back-to-Back NFC North Titles during Jackson's time in Green Bay.

=== Canadian Football League ===
He was signed by the Winnipeg Blue Bombers on May 6, 2009, after the Arena Football League suspended the 2009 season and later folded. He was released by Winnipeg on June 20, 2009.

== Coaching career ==
=== Chicago Bears ===
In 2018, Jackson was an assistant at the Chicago Bears' training camp as part of the Bill Walsh Diversity Coaching Fellowship, while also working as a wide receivers coach for Liberty High School in Peoria, Arizona.

On February 12, 2019, Jackson was hired by the Bears as a defensive assistant under head coach Matt Nagy. He was moved to assistant wide receivers coach in 2020. He was let go by the Bears after the 2021 season.

=== Jacksonville Jaguars ===
On February 17, 2022, Jackson was hired by the Jacksonville Jaguars as their wide receivers coach under head coach Doug Pederson.

=== University of Texas ===
On January 28, 2023, Jackson accepted the wide receivers coach position at the University of Texas at Austin.
