= Bruce McClure =

Bruce McClure is an artist who uses film projectors in his performance art. His work is often performed in the context of experimental film and underground music.

His work was included in both the 2002 and 2004 biennial exhibitions of the Whitney Museum of American Art. The Museum of the Moving Image included commentary by critic Leo Goldsmith about two McClure projects in its round-up of moving image highlights from 2009.
