= Derek Lee (American football) =

American football player (born 1981)

No. 25
- Position: Wide receiver

Personal information
- Born: September 26, 1981 (age 45); College Park, Georgia, U.S.
- Listed height: 6 ft 5 in (1.96 m)
- Listed weight: 230 lb (104 kg)

Career information
- College: Tennessee Tech

Career history
- Georgia Force (2005–2007); Columbus Destroyers (2008); Dallas Vigilantes (2010); Chicago Rush (2011); Georgia Force (2012); San Antonio Talons (2012–2013); New Orleans VooDoo (2013)

Awards and highlights
- First-team All-Arena (2006)

Career AFL statistics
- Receptions: 672
- Receiving yards: 7,717
- Receiving touchdowns: 160
- Stats at ArenaFan.com

Derek Lee (born September 26, 1981) is an American former professional football wide receiver who played in the Arena Football League (AFL) for the Georgia Force, Columbus Destroyers, Dallas Vigilantes, Chicago Rush, San Antonio Talons, and New Orleans VooDoo. He played college football at Tennessee Tech.
