= Willie Gary (American football) =

American football player (born 1978)

Profile
- Position: Defensive back

Personal information
- Born: November 1, 1978 (age 48)

Career information
- College: Kentucky

Career history
- 2001: St. Louis Rams
- 2002: Scottish Claymores
- 2003–2008: Georgia Force
- Stats at Pro Football Reference
- Stats at ArenaFan.com

Willie Gary (born November 1, 1978), is an American football defensive back, who played in the National Football League for the St. Louis Rams, in NFL Europa for the Scottish Claymores, and in the Arena Football League for Georgia Force. He was a member of the 2001 Rams team, who lost Super Bowl XXXVI to the New England Patriots, in 2002.

On February 15, 2008, he filed a $100 million lawsuit in a New Orleans, Louisiana United States district court against the Patriots, Belichick, and Patriots owner Robert Kraft seeking compensation for the Rams' Super Bowl XXXVI loss in light of the allegations. The lawsuit was withdrawn on March 10, 2008, after Gary's lawyers called securing testimony from Walsh regarding his possible knowledge of the allegation an "exercise in futility."

Gary played at Valdosta High School (Valdosta, Georgia) where he earned All-State honors. In his senior season of high school he was the defensive captain on the 1996 state runner-up team. Gary has since begun a career in coaching, with stops at both North Gwinnett High School and Shiloh High School in his native Georgia. Along with 2 years as defensive coordinator for the Georgia Force of the Arena Football League, Gary was also the defensive coordinator and interim head coach at Clark Atlanta University. He is currently the head coach at Berkmar High School in Lilburn, GA, and also the defensive coordinator for the Atlanta Havoc of the American Arena League.
