= Georgia Force =

Arena football team

Logo

General information
- Founded: 2002 (Original incarnation)
- Folded: 2012 (Second incarnation)
- Headquartered: Arena at Gwinnett Center in Duluth, Georgia
- Colors: Blue, black, white
- Mascot: Blu

Personnel
- Owner: Doug MacGregor
- Head coach: Dean Cokinos
- President: Corey Remillard

Team history
- First franchise; Nashville Kats (1997–2001); Georgia Force (2002–2008); Second franchise; Tennessee Valley Vipers (2000–2004, 2006–2009); Alabama Vipers (2010); Georgia Force (2011–2012)

Home fields
- Philips Arena (2002, 2005–2007); Arena at Gwinnett Center (2003–2004, 2008, 2011–2012)

League / conference affiliations
- Arena Football League (2002–2012): American Conference (2002–2008, 2011–2012); South (1997–2001, 2005–2007)

Championships
- Conference championships: 1: 2005; Prior to 2005, the AFL did not have conference championship games
- Division championships: 3: 2005, 2007, 2008

Playoff appearances (6)
- 2003, 2005, 2006, 2007, 2008, 2012

The Georgia Force was an Arena Football League (AFL) team based in Gwinnett County, Georgia, United States (part of suburban Atlanta) that played in the South Division of the American Conference. The team was owned by Doug MacGregor and Donn Jennings.

Following the termination of operations of the Arena Football League on August 4, 2009, Georgia Force officials quickly followed with a release that indicated that they, too, were ceasing operations.

In 2010, the Alabama Vipers announced they would leave Huntsville, and would move to suburban Atlanta for the 2011 AFL season, once again playing home games at Arena at Gwinnett Center.

Following the 2012 season, the franchise folded citing, "The market never responded to our extensive marketing and sales campaign," said team president Corey Remillard. "With all of the outreach, marketing, community and public relations that we put forward, it would have been impossible to not know that we were playing here, and the city simply did not respond. Atlanta is simply not a football town."

== History ==
=== The original Nashville Kats ===
The team began as the first Nashville Kats team from 1997 to 2001. The original Kats played in the Nashville Arena (later known as Gaylord Entertainment Center, now known as Bridgestone Arena) in downtown Nashville and were initially coached by Eddie Khayat in 1997 and 1998. Khayat was then succeeded by Pat Sperduto for the balance of the team's time in Nashville. The Kats were the league's "Organization of the Year" for their inaugural year of 1997, and were in the playoffs for every season of their relatively brief existence, even playing in the ArenaBowl each of their final two seasons, albeit losing both times they reached the AFL's championship game.

Virgil Williams, an Atlanta businessman, purchased the franchise for nearly $10 million in December 2001, and moved the team to Atlanta after the team's previous owners failed to negotiate a favorable lease with the arena's primary tenant and manager, the National Hockey League's Nashville Predators. The Kats would return to Nashville as an expansion team in 2005 (in a situation similar to the National Football League's Cleveland Browns). The second Nashville Kats team would fold after a losing 2007 season.

=== First dispersal draft ===
1. OL/DL Mike Lawson- (Miami)-formerly Florida Bobcats
2. WR/DB Kusanti Abdul-Salaam - (UCLA)-formerly Oklahoma Wranglers
3. FB/DB Scott Byrd Johnson (Ole Miss)-formerly-Knoxville Nighthawks(PIFL)
4. OL/DL Marcus Keyes (North Alabama)-formerly- Florida Bobcats
5. DS Scotty Lundsey (Stephen F. Austin)-formerly-Houston Thunderbears
6. DB Nate Jacks (University of Kansas)-formerly-Lincoln Capitols (NIFL)

(reference:)

=== Georgia Force ===
The rechristened Force initially played in Duluth, a suburb of Atlanta, in the Arena at Gwinnett Center until relocating in the 2004 season to Philips Arena in downtown Atlanta.

The team name was chosen through a contest in the Atlanta Journal-Constitution. Anthony R Ward submitted the winning name.

Under Williams' three-year tenure as owner, the team made the playoffs one time in 2003. Upon selling the team to Atlanta Falcons owner Arthur Blank in September 2004, it was announced that the franchise would return to the downtown Philips Arena for the 2005 season in response to fan desires as expressed in a poll. However, following the 2007 season, the Force announced they were returning to the Gwinnett Center in 2008 after signing a 10-year lease.

The Georgia Force's only rival in the Arena Football League was the New Orleans VooDoo. Previous owners of both teams, owned NFL teams in the same market. The New Orleans Saints rivaled with The Atlanta Falcons & The New Orleans VooDoo rivaled with The Georgia Force.

The 2005 season was, by far, the most successful in team history with highlights including a conference-best 11–5 record, and undefeated home record (8–0), a division title, a National Conference Championship, and a trip to ArenaBowl XIX. They lost to the Colorado Crush, 51–48. They also won Southern Division titles in 2007 and 2008.

The Force's official mascot used to be a high-tech runner named G-Force, but was later changed to a blue, cuddly monster named Blu.

=== Revival ===
An unrelated traveling team bearing the same name played in the short-lived 2024 Arena Football League.

== Season-by-season ==
ArenaBowl champions	ArenaBowl appearance	Division champions	Playoff berth

Season	League	Conference	Division	Regular season			Postseason results
Season	League	Conference	Division	Finish	Wins	Losses	Postseason results
Georgia Force
2002	AFL	National	Southern	4th	6	8	
2003	AFL	National	Southern	3rd	8	8	Won Wild Card Round (Dallas) 49–45; Lost Quarterfinals (San Jose) 69–48
2004	AFL	National	Southern	5th	7	9	
2005	AFL	National	Southern	1st	11	5	Won Conference Semifinals (Tampa Bay) 62–46; Won Conference Championship (Orlando) 60–58; Lost ArenaBowl XIX (Colorado) 51–48
2006	AFL	National	Southern	3rd	8	8	Won Wild Card Round (New York) 72–69; Lost Divisional Round (Dallas) 62–27
2007	AFL	National	Southern	1st	14	2	Won Divisional Round (Philadelphia) 65–39; Lost Conference Championship (Columbus) 66–56
2008	AFL	National	Southern	1st	10	6	Lost Divisional Round (Cleveland) 73–70
2009	The AFL suspended operations for the 2009 season.						
2010	Did not play in 2010.						
2011	AFL	American	South	2nd	11	7	Won Conference Semifinals (Cleveland) 50–41; Lost Conference Championship (Jacksonville) 55–64
2012	AFL	American	South	2nd	9	9	Lost Conference Semifinals (Jacksonville) 58–56
Total					84	62	(includes only regular season)
Total					6	7	(includes only the postseason)
Total					90	69	(includes both regular season and postseason)

== Coaches ==
Coaches listed are Georgia Force coaches only, not for the Nashville Kats.

Head coach	Tenure	Regular season record (W–L)	Post season record (W–L)	Most recent coaching staff	Notes
Robert Lyles	2002	1–4	0–0		
Marty Lowe	2002–2004	12–15	1–1		
Bob Kronenberg	2004	3–2	0–0		
Doug Plank	2005–2008	43–21	4–4		2x Arena Football League; Coach of the Year (2005, 2007)
Dean Cokinos	2011–2012	11–7	1–0	Asst./Line Coach: James Clark (2011–present); Asst./Line Coach: Juan Porter (2011–present); Asst./DB Coach: Willie Gary (2011–present)	

== Notable players ==
=== Individual awards ===
Breakout Player of the Year
Season	Player	Position
2011	Maurice Purify	WR

Kicker of the Year
Season	Player	Position
2011	Carlos Martinez	K

AFL Rookie of the Year
Season	Player	Position
2005	Troy Bergeron	OS
2011	Maurice Purify	WR

=== All-Arena players ===
The following Force players were named to All-Arena Teams:

- QB Matt Nagy (1), Chris Greisen (1)
- WR/LB Derek Lee (1)
- WR Chris Jackson (1), Troy Bergeron (1), Maurice Purify (1)
- OL/DL Jermaine Smith (3), Gillis Wilson (1)
- OL Marcus Keyes (1) Shane Grice (1)
- DL Jermaine Smith (1)
- LB Umar Muhammad (1)
- DB Tracy Belton (1)
- DS Kevin Gaines (2)
- K Carlos Martinez (1)

=== All-Ironman players ===
The following Force players were named to All-Ironman Teams:

- FB/LB Travis Reece (1), Scott Byrd Johnson (1), Matt Huebner (1)
- WR/LB Darryl Hammond (1), Derek Lee (1)
- WR/KR C. J. Johnson (1),

=== All-Rookie players ===
The following Force players were named to All-Rookie Teams:

- QB Leon Murray
- FB/LB Robert Thomas
- WR/LB Derek Lee
- OL/DL Jermaine Smith
- OS Troy Bergeron
- WR/CB Tiger Jones
