= 2008 New York Dragons season =

Arena Football League team season

- Head coach: Weylan Harding
- Home stadium: Nassau Veterans Memorial Coliseum

Results
- Record: 8–8
- Division place: 4th
- Playoffs: Won Wild Card Playoffs (Desperados) 77–63; Lost Divisional Playoffs (Soul) 48–49

The 2008 New York Dragons season is the 14th season for the franchise, their eighth season in New York. The Dragons finished the regular season with an 8–8 record, and were able to take the 6th and final playoff seed in the National Conference by virtue of winning a tiebreaker scenario over the New Orleans VooDoo. The Dragons won their Wild Card round game, upsetting the Dallas Desperados 77–63. The Desperados had defeated the Dragons in both regular season meetings. In the Divisional round of the playoffs, the Dragons lost to top seeded Philadelphia Soul, 48–49, who the Dragons had also lost both regular season meetings to.

== Standings ==
Eastern Division
Team	W	L	PCT	PF	PA	DIV	CONF	Home	Away
Philadelphia Soul^{(1)}	13	3	.813	992	810	7–1	9–2	7–1	6–2
Dallas Desperados^{(3)}	12	4	.750	861	798	6–2	9–2	6–2	6–2
Cleveland Gladiators^{(4)}	9	7	.563	901	895	4–4	5–6	6–2	3–5
New York Dragons^{(6)}	8	8	.500	822	819	2–6	4–7	5–3	3–5
Columbus Destroyers	3	13	.188	750	893	1–7	2–10	2–6	1–7

== Regular season schedule ==
Week	Date	Opponent	Result	Record	Location	Attendance	Recap
1	March 3	at Cleveland Gladiators	L 49–61	0–1	Quicken Loans Arena	17,391	Recap
2	March 9	Kansas City Brigade	W 50–47	1–1	Nassau Coliseum	10,542	Recap
3	March 16	at Philadelphia Soul	L 42–63	1–2	Wachovia Center	16,102	Recap
4	March 21	at Arizona Rattlers	L 33–62	1–3	US Airways Center	11,689	Recap
5	March 30	Dallas Desperados	L 31–33	1–4	Nassau Coliseum	8,216	Recap
6	April 5	Grand Rapids Rampage	W 63–34	2–4	Nassau Coliseum	8,211	Recap
7	April 13	Columbus Destroyers	W 62–44	3–4	Nassau Coliseum	7,346	Recap
8	April 18	at Tampa Bay Storm	W 66–47	4–4	St. Pete Times Forum	17,104	Recap
9	April 26	Cleveland Gladiators	W 56–39	5–4	Nassau Coliseum	9,991	Recap
10	Bye Week						
11	May 10	at Los Angeles Avengers	W 52–48	6–4	Staples Center	13,422	Recap
12	May 18	Georgia Force	L 67–72	6–5	Nassau Coliseum	8,634	Recap
13	May 24	at Columbus Destroyers	L 41–43	6–6	Nationwide Arena	12,842	Recap
14	June 2	at Colorado Crush	W 73–65	7–6	Pepsi Center	14,078	Recap
15	June 7	New Orleans VooDoo	W 58–51	8–6	Nassau Coliseum	9,922	Recap
16	June 14	at Dallas Desperados	L 49–51	8–7	American Airlines Center	12,042	Recap
17	June 22	Philadelphia Soul	L 30–59	8–8	Nassau Coliseum	9,718	Recap

== Playoff schedule ==
Round	Date	Opponent (seed)	Result	Location	Attendance	Recap
NC Wild Card	June 27	at Dallas Desperados (3)	W 77–63	American Airlines Center	10,076	Recap
NC Divisional	July 5	at Philadelphia Soul (1)	L 48–49	Wachovia Center	16,102	Recap

== Regular season ==
=== Week 1: at Cleveland Gladiators ===
Quarter	1	2	3	4	Total
NY	0	21	14	14	49
CLE	14	16	10	21	61

at Quicken Loans Arena, Cleveland, Ohio

- Date: March 3
- Game time: 7:00 PM EST
- Game attendance: 17,391

Game information

1st Quarter:

- 14:35 CLE – McCULLOUGH 37 yd pass from PHILYAW (BALL kick) – 7–0 CLE
- 03:25 CLE – Redd 22 yd pass from PHILYAW (BALL kick) – 14–0 CLE

2nd Quarter:

- 12:19 NY – SWAYNE 5 yd pass from DAVEY (ONORATO kick) – 14–7 CLE
- 10:50 CLE – AMEY 13 yd pass from PHILYAW (BALL kick failed) – 20–7 CLE
- 06:57 NY – PRICE 1 yd run (ONORATO kick) – 20–14 CLE
- 01:24 CLE – AMEY 3 yd pass from PHILYAW (BALL kick) – 27–14 CLE
- 00:31 NY – SWAYNE 16 yd pass from DAVEY (ONORATO kick) – 27–21 CLE
- 00:00 CLE – BALL 28 yd field goal – 30–21 CLE

3rd Quarter:

- 11:40 NY – SWAYNE 4 yd pass from DAVEY (ONORATO kick) – 30–28 CLE
- 04:38 CLE – BALL 32 yd field goal – 33–28 CLE
- 02:15 NY – ANTHONY 10 yd pass from DAVEY (ONORATO kick) – 35–33 NY
- 01:00 CLE – JACKSON 32 yd run (BALL kick) – 40–35 CLE

4th Quarter:

- 13:54 CLE – AMEY 4 yd run (BALL kick) – 47–35 CLE
- 08:55 NY – ANTHONY 4 yd pass from DAVEY (ONORATO kick) – 47–42 CLE
- 06:45 CLE – JACKSON 6 yd pass from PHILYAW (BALL kick) – 54–42 CLE
- 00:06 CLE – Redd 50 yd interception return (BALL kick) – 61–42 CLE
- 00:00 NY – GROCE 56 yd kickoff return (ONORATO kick) – 61–49 CLE
- Officials: Dennis Lipski; Rick Nelson; Brent Durbin; Darrel Leftwich; Reggie Smith; Jason Tirotta;
- Offensive Player of the Game: Raymond Philyaw, Cleveland, QB
- Defensive Player of the Game: Brandon Hefflin, Cleveland, DB
- Ironman of the Game: Marlion Jackson, Cleveland, RB

=== Week 2: vs. Kansas City Brigade ===
Quarter	1	2	3	4	Total
KC	12	7	13	15	47
NY	7	9	14	20	50

at Nassau Veterans Memorial Coliseum, Uniondale, New York

- Date: March 9
- Game time: 3:00 PM EST
- Game attendance: 10,542

Game information

1st Quarter:

- 08:00 NY – WILLIS 15 yd pass from DAVEY (ONORATO kick) – 7–0 NY
- 05:47 KC – FITZGERALD 5 yd run (MARTINEZ kick failed) – 7–6 NY
- 01:03 KC – HORACEK 13 yd pass from FITZGERALD (MARTINEZ kick failed) – 12–7 KC

2nd Quarter:

- 00:53 NY – WILLIS 9 yd pass from DAVEY (ONORATO kick blocked) – 13–12 NY
- 00:20 KC – FITZGERALD 1 yd run (MARTINEZ kick) – 19–13 KC
- 00:00 NY – ONORATO 41 yd field goal – 19–16 KC

3rd Quarter:

- 14:31 KC – FREDERICK 45 yd pass from FITZGERALD (MARTINEZ kick) – 26–16 KC
- 13:13 NY – WILLIS 21 yd pass from DAVEY (ONORATO kick) – 26–23 KC
- 03:43 NY – WALKER 2 yd fumble recovery (ONORATO kick) – 30–26 NY
- 00:52 KC – MYERS 21 yd pass from FITZGERALD (MARTINEZ kick failed) – 32–30 KC

4th Quarter:

- 14:49 NY – HENRY 39 yd pass from DAVEY (ONORATO kick) – 37–32 NY
- 09:35 KC – FITZGERALD 1 yd run (MARTINEZ kick) – 39–37 KC
- 04:35 NY – ANTHONY 5 yd pass from DAVEY (ONORATO kick) – 44–39 NY
- 01:29 KC – HORACEK 22 yd pass from FITZGERALD (FREDERICK pass from FITZGERALD) – 47–44 KC
- 00:22 NY – WILLIS 2 yd pass from DAVEY (ONORATO kick failed) – 50–47 NY
- Officials: Referee: Perry Havener; Umpire: Tom Laverty; Linesman: Kavin McGrath; Line judge: David Meslow; Back judge: K. Washington
- Offensive Player of the Game: N/A
- Defensive Player of the Game: N/A
- Ironman Player of the Game: N/A

=== Week 3: at Philadelphia Soul ===
Quarter	1	2	3	4	Total
NY	14	7	7	14	42
PHI	14	14	14	21	63

at Wachovia Center, Philadelphia, Pennsylvania

- Date: March 16
- Game time: 2:00 PM EST
- Game attendance: 16,102

Game information

1st Quarter:

- 12:06 PHI – JACKSON 25 yd pass from GRAZIANI (HUGHES kick) – 7–0 PHI
- 05:40 NY – ANTHONY 2 yd pass from GARCIA (ONORATO kick) – 7–7
- 03:19 PHI – BRACKINS 23 yd pass from GRAZIANI (HUGHES kick) – 14–7 PHI
- 00:15 NY – SWAYNE 21 yd pass from GARCIA (ONORATO kick) – 14–14

2nd Quarter:

- 13:20 PHI – DELL 15 yd pass from GRAZIANI (HUGHES kick) – 21–14 PHI
- 09:33 NY – SWAYNE 17 yd pass from GARCIA (ONORATO kick) – 21–21
- 05:04 PHI – JACKSON 10 yd pass from GRAZIANI (HUGHES kick) – 28–21

3rd Quarter:

- 12:00 NY – WILLIS 5 yd pass from GARCIA (ONORATO kick) – 28–28
- 07:20 PHI – JACKSON 11 yd pass from GRAZIANI (HUGHES kick) – 35–28 PHI
- 00:47 PHI – BRACKINS 21 yd pass from GRAZIANI (HUGHES kick) – 42–28 PHI

4th Quarter:

- 13:37 NY – SWAYNE 9 yd pass from GARCIA (ONORATO kick) – 42–35 PHI
- 09:05 PHI – HAWKINS1 yd run (HUGHES kick) – 49–35 PHI
- 04:58 NY – PARSONS 2 yd pass from GARCIA (ONORATO kick) – 49–42 PHI
- 00:50 PHI – DELANEY 1 yd run (HUGHES kick) – 56–42 PHI
- 00:19 PHI – DAVIS 35 yd interception return (HUGHES kick) – 63–42 PHI
- Officials: Referee: Tim McCabe; Umpire: Rick Podraza; Linesman: Rod Pearson; Line judge: Dana McKenzie; Back judge: Scott Helverson
- Offensive Player of the Game: Chris Jackson (PHI)
- Defensive Player of the Game: Gabe Nyenhuis (PHI)
- Ironman Player of the Game: Mike Brown (PHI)

=== Week 4: at Arizona Rattlers ===
Quarter	1	2	3	4	Total
NY	7	3	7	16	33
ARZ	14	21	13	14	62

at US Airways Center, Phoenix, Arizona

- Date: March 21
- Game time: 10:00 PM EST
- Game attendance: 11,689

Game information

1st Quarter:

- 08:40 ARZ – Trandon Harvey 6 yd pass from Jeff Smoker (Eric Houle kick) – 7–0 ARZ
- 07:50 NY – Levy Brown 52 yd kickoff return (Chris Onorato kick) – 7–7
- 03:45 ARZ – Jeff Smoker 2 yd run (Eric Houle kick) – 14–7 ARZ

2nd Quarter:

- 13:21 ARZ – Trandon Harvey 1 yd run (Eric Houle kick) – 21–7 ARZ
- 06:53 NY – Chris Onorato 30 yd field goal – 21–10 ARZ
- 01:44 ARZ – Wendall Gaines 1 yd pass from Jeff Smoker (Eric Houle kick) – 28–10 ARZ
- 00:15 ARZ – Trandon Harvey 45 yd pass from Jeff Smoker (Eric Houle kick) 35–10 ARZ

3rd Quarter:

- 10:36 ARZ – Trandon Harvey 12 yd pass from Jeff Smoker (Eric Houle kick) – 42–10 ARZ
- 04:59 NY – Kevin Swayne 19 yd pass from Rohan Davey (Chris Onorato kick) – 42–17 ARZ
- 01:52 ARZ – Kevin Nickerson 36 yd pass from Jeff Smoker (Eric Houle kick failed) – 48–17 ARZ

4th Quarter:

- 14:57 NY – Keron Henry 6 yd pass from Rohan Davey (Kevin Swayne pass from DAVEY) – 48–25 ARZ
- 10:39 ARZ – Isaiah Trufant 28 yd fumble recovery (Eric Houle kick) – 55–25 ARZ
- 04:37 NY – Henry Taylor safety – 55–27 ARZ
- 00:44 ARZ – Kevin Nickerson 14 yd run (Eric Houle kick) – 62–27 ARZ
- 00:00 NY – Chris Anthony 14 yd pass from Rohan Davey (Rohan Davey pass failed) – 62–33 ARZ
- Officials: Referee: CUTAIA, Dave; Umpire: GRANADO, Al; Linesman: MCCABE, Mike; Line judge: LUCKY, Art; Back judge: COLE, James
- Offensive Player of the Game: Jeff Smoker (ARZ)
- Defensive Player of the Game: Isaiah Trufant (ARZ)
- Ironman Player of the Game: Wendall Gaines (ARZ)

=== Week 5: vs. Dallas Desperados ===
Quarter	1	2	3	4	Total
DAL	14	0	3	16	33
NY	7	10	14	0	31

at Nassau Veterans Memorial Coliseum, Uniondale, New York

- Date: March 30
- Game time: 3:00 PM EST
- Game attendance: 8,216

Game information

1st Quarter:

- 13:52 DAL – Josh White 3 yd run (Remy Hamilton kick) – 7–0 DAL
- 09:24 NY – Chris Anthony 9 yd pass from Aaron Garcia (Chris Onorato kick) – 7–7
- 03:15 DAL – Will Pettis 21 yd pass from Chris Sanders (Remy Hamilton kick) – 14–7 DAL

2nd Quarter:

- 09:38 NY – Kevin Swayne 2 yd pass from Aaron Garcia (Chris Onorato kick) – 14–14
- 00:26 NY – Chris Onorato 19 yd field goal – 17–14 NYD

3rd Quarter:

- 12:57 NY – Chris Anthony 28 yd pass from Aaron Garcia (Chris Onorato kick) – 24–14 NYD
- 06:36 DAL – Remy Hamilton 24 yd field goal – 24–17 NYD
- 04:12 NY – Angel Estrada 43 yd interception return (Chris Onorato kick) – 31–17 NYD

4th Quarter:

- 13:03 DAL – Marcus Nash 9 yd pass from Chris Sanders – (Remy Hamilton kick) 31–24 NYD
- 06:19 DAL – Marcus Nash 7 yd pass from Chris Sanders – (Remy Hamilton kick) 31–31
- 02:01 DAL – Colston Weatherington safety – 33–31 DAL
- Officials: Dave Lambros, Doug Wilson, Kelly Saalfeld, Brian Matthew, Rich Wilborn, Robert Benson.
- Offensive Player of the Game: Marcus Nash (DAL)
- Defensive Player of the Game: Henry Taylor (NY)
- Ironman Player of the Game: Will Pettis (DAL)

=== Week 6: vs. Grand Rapids Rampage ===
Quarter	1	2	3	4	Total
GR	0	0	21	13	34
NY	21	14	21	7	63

at Nassau Veterans Memorial Coliseum, Uniondale, New York

- Date: April 5
- Game time: 7:00 PM EST
- Game attendance: 8,211

Game information

1st Quarter:

- 11:22 NY – Chris Anthony 19 yd pass from Aaron Garcia (Chris Onorato kick) – 7–0 NY
- 04:37 NY – Keron Henry 33 yd pass from Aaron Garcia (Chris Onorato kick) – 14–0 NY
- 01:49 NY – Jason Willis 16 yd pass from Aaron Garcia (Chris Onorato kick) – 21–0 NY

2nd Quarter:

- 11:09 NY – Terry Moss 16 yd pass from Aaron Garcia (Chris Onorato kick) – 28–0 NY
- 03:15 NY – Aaron Garcia 2 yd run (Chris Onorato kick) – 35–0 NY

3rd Quarter:

- 13:49 NY – Chris Anthony 27 yd pass from Aaron Garcia (Chris Onorato kick) – 42–0 NY
- 11:29 NY – John Walker 15 yd interception return (Chris Onorato kick) – 49–0 NY
- 08:16 GR – Jermaine Lewis 4 yd pass from James MacPherson (Brian Gowins kick) – 49–7 NY
- 07:47 GR – William Haith 1 yd fumble recovery (Brian Gowins kick) – 49–14 NY
- 03:43 GR – Fitu Tu'ua 19 yd pass from James MacPherson (Brian Gowins kick) – 49–21 NY
- 00:34 NY – Chris Anthony 6 yd pass from Aaron Garcia (Chris Onorato kick) – 56–21 NY

4th Quarter:

- 07:03 GR – Ahmad Hawkins 42 yd interception return (Brian Gowins kick) – 56–28 NY
- 04:53 NY – Chris Anthony 2 yd pass from Aaron Garcia (Chris Onorato kick) – 63–28 NY
- 02:59 GR – Kenny Higgins 27 yd pass from James MacPherson (Brian Gowins kick failed) – 63–34 NY
- Officials: Referee: Bill Athan; Umpire: Matt Jordan; Linesman: Allan Baynes; Line judge: Rusty Baynes; Back judge: Greg Wilson
- Offensive Player of the Game: Aaron Garcia (NY)
- Defensive Player of the Game: John Walker (NY)
- Ironman Player of the Game: Chris Anthony (NY)

- Rookie Defensive Speacilist John Walker was Named Defensive Player of the Week

=== Week 7: vs. Columbus Destroyers ===
Quarter	1	2	3	4	Total
CLB	3	14	7	20	44
NY	7	21	14	20	62

at Nassau Veterans Memorial Coliseum, Uniondale, New York

- Date: April 13
- Game time: 3:00 PM EST
- Game attendance: 7,346

Game information

1st Quarter:

- 09:27 CLB – Mark Lewis 24 yd field goal – 3–0 CLB
- 08:13 NY – Kevin Swayne 21 yd pass from Aaron Garcia (Chris Onorato kick) – 7–3 NY

2nd Quarter:

- 07:57 NY – Kevin Swayne 1 yd pass from Aaron Garcia (Chris Onorato kick) – 14–3 NY
- 07:10 CLB – Rasheed Marshall 57 yd kickoff return (Mark Lewis kick) – 14–10 NY
- 02:50 NY – Jason Willis 4 yd pass from Aaron Garcia (Chris Onorato kick) – 21–10 NY
- 00:43 CLB – Derek Lee 15 yd pass from Matt Nagy (Mark Lewis kick) – 21–17 NY
- 00:09 NY – Kevin Swayne 8 yd pass from Aaron Garcia (Chris Onorato kick) – 28–17 NY

3rd Quarter:

- 13:13 NY – Chris Anthony 17 yd pass from Aaron Garcia (Chris Onorato kick) – 35–17 NY
- 09:47 CLB – Derek Lee 10 yd pass from Matt Nagy (Mark Lewis kick) – 35–24 NY
- 05:27 NY – Jason Willis 28 yd pass from Aaron Garcia (Chris Onorato kick) – 42–24 NY

4th Quarter:

- 06:50 NY – Chris Anthony 5 yd pass from Aaron Garcia (Chris Onorato kick failed) – 48–24 NY
- 04:11 CLB – Derek Lee 36 yd pass from Matt Nagy (Mark Lewis kick) – 48–31 NY
- 03:06 NY – Chris Anthony 8 yd pass from Aaron Garcia (Chris Onorato kick) – 55–31 NY
- 01:38 CLB – Calvin Russell 39 yd pass from Matt Nagy (Matt Nagy pass failed) – 55–37 NY
- 00:35 NY – Juston Wood 5 yd run (Chris Onorato kick) – 62–37 NY
- 00:18 CLB – Rasheed Marshall 38 yd pass from Matt Nagy (Mark Lewis kick) – 62–44 NY
- Officials: Referee: Tom McCabe; Umpire: Rick Podraza; Linesman: Rod Pearson; Line judge: Dana McKenzie; Back judge: Scott Helverson
- Offensive Player of the Game: Aaron Garcia (NY)
- Defensive Player of the Game: Henry Taylor (NY)
- Ironman Player of the Game: Rasheed Marshall (CLB)

=== Week 8: at Tampa Bay Storm ===
Quarter	1	2	3	4	Total
NY	10	23	12	21	66
TB	14	13	7	13	47

at St. Pete Times Forum, Tampa, Florida

- Date: April 18
- Game time: 7:30 PM EST
- Game attendance: 17,104

Game information

1st Quarter:

- 10:28 TB – MARSHALL, Torra 1 yd run (MARLER, Seth kick) – 7–0 TB
- 07:41 NY – ANTHONY, Chris 7 yd pass from GARCIA, Aaron (ONORATO, Chris kick) – 7–7
- 04:30 NY – ONORATO, Chris 19 yd field goal – 10–7 NY
- 01:45 TB – SHAW, Terrill 6 yd pass from DIETZ, Brett (MARLER, Seth kick) – 14–10 TB

2nd Quarter:

- 13:40 NY – SEIFERT, Elliot 11 yd pass from GARCIA, Aaron (ONORATO, Chris kick) – 17–14 NY
- 07:13 NY – SWAYNE, Kevin 22 yd pass from GARCIA, Aaron (ONORATO, Chris kick failed) – 23–14 NY
- 05:18 TB – SHAW, Terrill 27 yd pass from DIETZ, Brett (MARLER, Seth kick failed) – 23–20 NY
- 03:24 NY – WILLIS, Jason 8 yd pass from GARCIA, Aaron (ONORATO, Chris kick) – 30–20 NY
- 00:08 TB – EDWARDS, Hank 5 yd pass from DIETZ, Brett (MARLER, Seth kick) – 30–27 NY
- 00:00 NY – ONORATO, Chris 42 yd field goal – 33–27 NY

3rd Quarter:

- 09:38 NY – ONORATO, Chris 38 yd field goal – 36–27 NY
- 08:51 NY – ADELEKAN, Farou safety – 38–27 NY
- 04:24 NY – WILLIS, Jason 4 yd pass from GARCIA, Aaron (ONORATO, Chris kick) – 45–27 NY
- 02:20 TB – EDWARDS, Hank 5 yd pass from DIETZ, Brett (MARLER, Seth kick) – 45–34 NY

4th Quarter:

- 14:55 NY – ANTHONY, Chris 23 yd pass from GARCIA, Aaron (ONORATO, Chris kick) – 52–34 NY
- 09:46 TB – SAUNDERS, David 3 yd pass from DIETZ, Brett (MARLER, Seth kick failed) – 52–40 NY
- 08:28 NY – SWAYNE, Kevin 5 yd pass from GARCIA, Aaron (ONORATO, Chris kick) – 59–40 NY
- 04:41 NY – NIX, John 20 yd fumble recovery (ONORATO, Chris kick) – 66–40 NY
- 01:25 TB – SAMUELS, Lawren 16 yd pass from DIETZ, Brett (MARLER, Seth kick) – 66–47 NY
- Officials: Referee: Bill LeMonnier; Umpire: Jeff Carr; Linesman: Greg Shields; Line judge: Dave Chesney; Back judge: Billy Beckett
- Offensive Player of the Game: Aaron Garcia (NY)
- Defensive Player of the Game: Billy Parker (NY)
- Ironman Player of the Game: Chris Anthony (NY)

=== Week 9: vs. Cleveland Gladiators ===
Quarter	1	2	3	4	Total
CLE	13	7	13	6	39
NY	14	21	14	7	56

at Nassau Veterans Memorial Coliseum, Uniondale, New York

- Date: April 26
- Game time: 7:00 PM EST
- Game attendance: 9,991

Game information

1st Quarter:

- 11:13 CLE – Otis Amey 7 yd pass from Raymond Philyaw (Jason Ball kick) – 7–0 CLE
- 08:24 NY – Kevin Swayne 9 yd pass from Aaron Garcia (Chris Onorato kick) – 7–7
- 03:58 CLE – Marlion Jackson 1 yd run (Jason Ball kick failed) – 13–7 CLE
- 01:03 NY – Ricky Hall 1 yd run (Chris Onorato kick) – 14–13 NY

2nd Quarter:

- 12:35 NY – Terry Moss 12 yd pass from Aaron Garcia (Chris Onorato kick) – 21–13 NY
- 02:17 NY – Jason Willis 4 yd pass from Aaron Garcia (Chris Onorato kick) – 28–13 NY
- 00:54 CLE – Robert Redd 35 yd pass from Raymond Philyaw (Jason Ball kick) – 28–20 NY
- 00:30 NY – Kevin Swayne 6 yd pass from Aaron Garcia (Chris Onorato kick) – 35–20 NY

3rd Quarter:

- 11:27 NY – Kevin Swayne 4 yd pass from Aaron Garcia (Chris Onorato kick) – 42–20 NY
- 09:40 CLE – Marlion Jackson 14 yd run (Raymond Philyaw pass failed) – 42–26 NY
- 03:27 CLE – Robert Redd 29 yd pass from Raymond Philyaw (Jason Ball kick) – 42–33 NY
- 00:55 NY – Kevin Swayne 30 yd pass from Aaron Garcia (Chris Onorato kick) – 49–33 NY

4th Quarter:

- 10:14 CLE – Kimani Jones 4 yd pass from Raymond Philyaw (Raymond Philyaw pass intcpt) – 49–39 NY
- 00:23 NY – Jason Willis 31 yd pass from Aaron Garcia (Chris Onorato kick) – 56–39 NY
- Officials: Referee: Dennis Lipski; Umpire: Rick Nelson; Linesman: Brent Durbin; Line judge: Darrel Leftwich; Back judge: Reggie Smith
- Offensive Player of the Game: Kevin Swayne (NY)
- Defensive Player of the Game: Idris Price (NY)
- Ironman Player of the Game: Ricky Hall (NY)

=== Week 10 ===
Bye Week

=== Week 11: vs. Los Angeles Avengers ===
Quarter	1	2	3	4	Total
NY	13	14	7	18	52
LA	0	13	28	7	48

at Staples Center, Los Angeles, California

- Date: May 10
- Game time: 10:30 PM EST
- Game attendance: 13,422

Game information

1st Quarter:

- 13:19 NY – Billy Parker 20 yd interception return (Chris Onorato kick failed) – 6–0 NY
- 04:23 NY – Kevin Swayne 2 yd pass from Aaron Garcia (Chris Onorato kick) – 13–0 NY

2nd Quarter:

- 14:07 NY – Farouk Adelekan 34 yd missed FG return (Chris Onorato kick) – 20–0 NY
- 06:39 LA – Kevin Ingram 2 yd pass from Tim Hicks (Tyler Fredrickson kick failed) – 20–6 NY
- 02:09 NY – Jason Willis 9 yd pass from Aaron Garcia (Chris Onorato kick) – 27–6 NY
- 00:21 LA – LaShaun Ward 11 yd pass from Sonny Cumbie (Tyler Fredrickson kick) – 27–13 NY

3rd Quarter:

- 09:12 LA – Ryan Riddle 35 yd fumble recovery (Tyler Fredrickson kick) – 27–20 NY
- 06:50 NY – Jason Willis 23 yd pass from Aaron Garcia (Chris Onorato kick) – 34–20 NY
- 05:18 LA – LaShaun Ward 15 yd pass from Sonny Cumbie (Tyler Fredrickson kick) – 34–27 NY
- 03:46 LA – Kevin Ingram 16 yd pass from Sonny Cumbie (Tyler Fredrickson kick) – 34–34
- 00:29 LA – Michael Cobbins 2 yd run (Tyler Fredrickson kick) – 41–34 LA

4th Quarter:

- 14:27 NY – Jason Willis 35 yd pass from Aaron Garcia (Chris Onorato kick blocked) – 41–40 LA
- 10:25 LA – LaShaun Ward 4 yd run (Tyler Fredrickson kick) – 48–40 LA
- 08:01 NY – Kevin Swayne 7 yd pass from Aaron Garcia (Chris Onorato kick failed) – 48–46 LA
- 03:09 NY – Jason Willis 4 yd pass from Aaron Garcia (Aaron Garcia pass failed)- 52–48 NY
- Officials: Referee: Bill McCabe; Umpire: Mike Delaney; Linesman: Shawn Hochuli; Line judge: Dirk Bell; Back judge: Jimmy Buchanan
- Offensive Player of the Game: Jason Willis (NY)
- Defensive Player of the Game: Farouk Adeleken (NY)
- Ironman Player of the Game: Kevin Ingram (LA)

=== Week 12: vs. Georgia Force ===
Quarter	1	2	3	4	Total
GA	14	14	14	30	72
NY	7	34	13	13	67

at Nassau Veterans Memorial Coliseum, Uniondale, New York

- Date: May 18
- Game time: 3:00 PM EST
- Game attendance: 8,634

Game information

1st Quarter:

- 12:51 GA – Troy Bergeron 26 yd pass from Chris Greisen (Carlos Martinez kick) – 7–0 GA
- 07:20 NY – Chris Anthony 6 yd pass from Aaron Garcia (Steve Azar kick) – 7–7
- 01:41 GA – Tiger Jones 4 yd pass from Chris Greisen (Carlos Martinez kick) – 14–7 GA

2nd Quarter:

- 14:54 NY – Kevin Swayne 12 yd pass from Aaron Garcia (Steve Azar kick failed) – 14–13 GA
- 12:07 GA – Tiger Jones 8 yd pass from Chris Greisen (Carlos Martinez kick) – 21–13 GA
- 10:57 NY – Jason Willis 45 yd pass from Aaron Garcia (Steve Azar kick failed) – 21–19 GA
- 09:04 GA – Tiger Jones 42 yd pass from Chris Greisen (Carlos Martinez kick) – 28–19 GA
- 04:44 NY – Kevin Swayne 6 yd pass from Aaron Garcia (Steve Azar kick) – 28–26 GA
- 02:26 NY – Jason Willis 10 yd pass from Aaron Garcia (Kevin Swayne pass from Aaron Garcia) – 34–28 NY
- 00:00 NY – Kevin Swayne 3 yd pass from Aaron Garcia (Steve Azar kick) – 41–28 NY

3rd Quarter:

- 10:47 GA – Tiger Jones 15 yd pass from Chris Greisen (Carlos Martinez kick) – 41–35 NY
- 07:08 NY – Jason Willis 15 yd pass from Aaron Garcia (Steve Azar kick) – 48–35 NY
- 03:03 GA – Tiger Jones 4 yd pass from Chris Greisen (Carlos Martinez kick) – 48–42 NY
- 00:55 NY – Chris Anthony 31 yd pass from Aaron Garcia (Ricky Hall rush failed) – 54–42 NY

4th Quarter:

- 10:53 GA – Troy Bergeron 5 yd pass from Chris Greisen (Carlos Martinez kick) – 54–49 NY
- 09:51 GA – Carl Morris 26 yd pass from Chris Greisen (Carlos Martinez kick failed) – 55–54 GA
- 04:44 NY – Jason Willis 1 yd pass from Aaron Garcia (Aaron Garcia rush failed) – 60–55 NY
- 02:29 GA – Matt Huebner 2 yd run (Carlos Martinez kick) – 62–60 GA
- 00:53 NY – Kevin Swayne 10 yd pass from Aaron Garcia (Steve Azar kick) – 67–62 NY
- 00:09 GA – Tiger Jones 28 yd pass from Chris Greisen (Matt Huebner rush) – 70–67 GA
- 00:00 GA – Matt Huebner safety – 72–67 GA
- Officials: Referee: Riley Johnson; Umpire: Rick Lowe; Linesman: Julian Mapp; Line judge: RG Detillier; Back judge: Bud McCleskey
- Offensive Player of the Game: Tiger Jones (GA)
- Defensive Player of the Game: Billy Parker (NY)
- Ironman Player of the Game: Matt Huebner (GA)

=== Week 13: at Columbus Destroyers ===
Quarter	1	2	3	4	Total
NY	21	14	0	6	41
CLB	14	16	6	7	43

at Nationwide Arena, Columbus, Ohio

- Date: May 24
- Game time: 7:00 PM EST
- Game attendance: 12,842

Game information

1st Quarter:

- 13:10 NY – WILLIS, Jason 28 yd pass from GARCIA, Aaron (AZAR, Steve kick) – 7–0 NY
- 09:32 CLB – RUSSELL, Calvin 32 yd pass from NAGY, Matt (LEWIS, Mark kick) – 7–7
- 05:10 NY – ANTHONY, Chris 6 yd pass from GARCIA, Aaron (AZAR, Steve kick) – 14–7 NY
- 02:13 CLB – JOHNSON, C.J. 26 yd pass from NAGY, Matt (LEWIS, Mark kick) – 14–14
- 01:20 NY – SWAYNE, Kevin 20 yd pass from GARCIA, Aaron (AZAR, Steve kick) – 21–14 NY

2nd Quarter:

- 12:42 CLB – ILAOA, Nate 4 yd run (ZWICK, Justin rush failed) – 21–20 NY
- 09:03 NY – ANTHONY, Chris 4 yd pass from GARCIA, Aaron (AZAR, Steve kick) – 28–20 NY
- 01:53 CLB – JOHNSON, C.J. 5 yd pass from NAGY, Matt (LEWIS, Mark kick) – 28–27 NY
- 00:19 NY – WILLIS, Jason 9 yd pass from GARCIA, Aaron (AZAR, Steve kick) – 35–27 NY
- 00:00 CLB – LEWIS, Mark 32 yd field goal – 35–30 NY

3rd Quarter:

- 04:01 CLB – NAGY, Matt 2 yd run (LEWIS, Mark kick failed) – 36–35 CLB

4th Quarter:

- 12:18 CLB – RUSSELL, Calvin 40 yd pass from NAGY, Matt (LEWIS, Mark kick) – 43–35 CLB
- 00:35 NY – SWAYNE, Kevin 4 yd pass from GARCIA, Aaron (GARCIA, Aaron pass intcpt) – 43–41 CLB
- Officials: Referee: Dave Cutaia; Umpire: Rick Nelson; Linesman: Brent Durbin; Line judge: Darrel Leftwich; Back judge: Reggie Smith
- Offensive Player of the Game: CJ Johnson (CLB)
- Defensive Player of the Game: Matt Thomas (CLB)
- Ironman Player of the Game: N/A

=== Week 14: at Colorado Crush ===
Quarter	1	2	3	4	Total
NY	21	17	14	21	73
COL	7	24	21	13	65

at Pepsi Center, Denver, Colorado

- Date: June 2
- Game time: 10:30 PM EST
- Game attendance: 14,078

Game information

1st Quarter:

- 12:18 NY – HENRY 2 yd run (AZAR kick) – 7–0 NY
- 11:07 COL – OWENS 22 yd pass from DUTTON (YAUSSI kick) – 7–7
- 07:22 NY – WILLIS 3 yd pass from GARCIA (AZAR kick) – 14–7 NY
- 01:07 NY – HENRY 1 yd run (AZAR kick) – 21–7 NY

2nd Quarter:

- 11:57 COL – OWENS 13 yd pass from DUTTON (YAUSSI kick) – 21–14 NY
- 09:44 NY – WILLIS 7 yd pass from GARCIA (AZAR kick) – 28–14 NY
- 07:50 COL – WATTON 20 yd pass from DUTTON (YAUSSI kick) – 28–21 NY
- 04:42 NY – AZAR 51 yd field goal – 31–21 NY
- 03:02 COL – HOSACK 10 yd pass from DUTTON (YAUSSI kick) – 31–28 NY
- 00:36 NY – WILLIS 20 yd pass from GARCIA (AZAR kick) – 38–28 NY
- 00:00 COL – YAUSSI 27 yd field goal – 38–31 NY

3rd Quarter:

- 14:47 COL – OWENS 56 yd kickoff return (YAUSSI kick) – 38–38
- 10:45 NY – HALL 10 yd pass from GARCIA (AZAR kick) – 45–38 NY
- 07:15 COL – OWENS 20 yd pass from DUTTON (YAUSSI kick) – 45–45
- 04:04 NY – WILLIS 6 yd pass from GARCIA (AZAR kick) – 52–45 NY
- 00:55 COL – NELSON 14 yd pass from DUTTON (YAUSSI kick) – 52–52

4th Quarter:

- 12:30 NY – SWAYNE 7 yd pass from GARCIA (AZAR kick) – 59–52 NY
- 06:55 NY – SWAYNE 20 yd pass from GARCIA (AZAR kick) – 66–52 NY
- 05:06 COL – OWENS 19 yd pass from DUTTON (YAUSSI kick) – 66–59 NY
- 04:05 NY – GARCIA 2 yd run (AZAR kick) – 73–59 NY
- 00:38 COL – QUINNIE 6 yd pass from DUTTON (YAUSSI kick failed) – 73–65 NY
- Officials: Referee: Dave Cutaia; Umpire: Al Granado; Linesman: Mike McCabe; Line judge: Art Lucky; Back judge: James Cole
- Offensive Player of the Game: N/A
- Defensive Player of the Game: N/A
- Ironman Player of the Game: N/A

=== Week 15: vs. New Orleans VooDoo ===
Quarter	1	2	3	4	Total
NO	14	23	7	7	51
NY	10	20	14	14	58

at Nassau Veterans Memorial Coliseum, Uniondale, New York

- Date: June 7
- Game time: 7:00 PM EST
- Game attendance: 9,922

Game information

1st Quarter:

- 09:29 NO – James Jordan 5 yd pass from Danny Wimprine (Jonathan Ruffin kick) – 7–0 NO
- 06:34 NY – Keron Henry 2 yd run (Steve Azar kick) – 7–7
- 05:42 NO – Jeremiah Pope 56 yd kickoff return (Jonathan Ruffin kick) – 14–7 NO
- 01:34 NY – Steve Azar 48 yd field goal – 14–10 NO

2nd Quarter:

- 14:13 NO – Ira Gooch 6 yd pass from Danny Wimprine (Jonathan Ruffin kick) – 21–10 NO
- 09:21 NY – Kevin Swayne 3 yd pass from Aaron Garcia (Steve Azar kick) – 21–17 NO
- 06:41 NO – Jeremiah Pope 18 yd pass from Danny Wimprine (Jonathan Ruffin kick) – 28–17 NO
- 04:25 NY – Kevin Swayne 22 yd pass from Aaron Garcia (Steve Azar kick blocked) – 28–23 NO
- 04:25 NO – Lin-J Shell PAT return – 30–23 NO
- 01:55 NO – Ira Gooch 44 yd pass from Danny Wimprine (Jonathan Ruffin kick) – 37–23 NO
- 00:15 NY – Ricky Hall 9 yd pass from Aaron Garcia (Steve Azar kick) – 37–30 NO

3rd Quarter:

- 08:28 NY – Keron Henry 2 yd run (Steve Azar kick) – 37–37
- 04:58 NO – Jeremiah Pope 14 yd pass from Danny Wimprine (Jonathan Ruffin kick) – 44–37 NO
- 01:32 NY – Kevin Swayne 14 yd pass from Aaron Garcia (Steve Azar kick) – 44–44

4th Quarter:

- 08:36 NY – Kevin Swayne 7 yd pass from Aaron Garcia (Steve Azar kick) – 51–44 NY
- 05:17 NO – James Lynch 10 yd pass from Danny Wimprine (Jonathan Ruffin kick) – 51–51
- 02:15 NY – Keron Henry 3 yd run (Steve Azar kick) – 58–51 NY
- Officials: Referee: Bill McCabe; Umpire: Jeff Carr; Linesman: Shawn Hochuli; Line judge: Dirk Bell; Back judge: Jimmy Buchanan
- Offensive Player of the Game: Kevin Swayne (NY)
- Defensive Player of the Game: Billy Parker (NY)
- Ironman Player of the Game: Jeremiah Pope (NY)

=== Week 16: at Dallas Desperados ===
Quarter	1	2	3	4	Total
NY	7	7	21	14	49
DAL	14	17	13	7	51

at American Airlines Center, Dallas, Texas

- Date: June 14
- Game time: 8:00 PM EST
- Game attendance: 12,042

Game information

1st Quarter:

- 12:53 NY – SWAYNE, Kevin 3 yd pass from GARCIA, Aaron (AZAR, Steve kick) – 7–0 NY
- 10:42 DAL – THURMAN, Andrae 14 yd pass from DOLEZEL, Clint (HAMILTON, Remy kick) – 7–7
- 05:26 DAL – DOLEZEL, Clint 1 yd run (HAMILTON, Remy kick) – 14–7 DAL

2nd Quarter:

- 11:45 DAL – ARMSTRONG, Anth 18 yd pass from DOLEZEL, Clint (HAMILTON, Remy kick) – 21–7 DAL
- 07:08 DAL – THURMAN, Andrae 19 yd pass from DOLEZEL, Clint (HAMILTON, Remy kick) – 28–7 DAL
- 00:54 NY – PRICE, Idris 1 yd run (AZAR, Steve kick) – 28–14 DAL
- 00:01 DAL – HAMILTON, Remy 17 yd field goal – 31–14 DAL

3rd Quarter:

- 14:48 DAL – BUSH, Josh 56 yd kickoff return (HAMILTON, Remy kick) – 38–14 DAL
- 09:58 NY – PRICE, Idris 2 yd run (AZAR, Steve kick) – 38–21 DAL
- 07:10 NY – ANTHONY, Chris 3 yd pass from GARCIA, Aaron (AZAR, Steve kick) – 38–28 DAL
- 04:01 DAL – NASH, Marcus 13 yd pass from DOLEZEL, Clint (HAMILTON, Remy kick failed) – 44–28 DAL
- 03:00 NY – SWAYNE, Kevin 17 yd pass from GARCIA, Aaron (AZAR, Steve kick) – 44–35 DAL

4th Quarter:

- 11:12 NY – WILLIS, Jason 16 yd pass from GARCIA, Aaron (AZAR, Steve kick) – 44–42 DAL
- 01:27 DAL – THURMAN, Andrae 4 yd pass from DOLEZEL, Clint (HAMILTON, Remy kick) – 51–42 DAL
- 00:07 NY – WILLIS, Jason 2 yd pass from GARCIA, Aaron (AZAR, Steve kick) – 51–49 DAL
- Officials: Referee: Perry Havener; Umpire: Tom Laverty; Linesman: Allen Baynes; Line judge: David Meslow; Back judge: Ke. Washington
- Offensive Player of the Game: Clint Dolezel (DAL)
- Defensive Player of the Game: Donvetis Franklin (DAL)
- Ironman Player of the Game: Josh Bush (DAL)

=== Week 17: vs. Philadelphia Soul ===
Quarter	1	2	3	4	Total
PHI	14	28	10	7	59
NY	7	3	7	13	30

at Nassau Veterans Memorial Coliseum, Uniondale, New York

- Date: June 22
- Game time: 3:00 PM EST
- Game attendance: 9,718

Game information

1st Quarter:

- 10:22 PHI – Wes Ours 1 yd run (Connor Hughes kick) – 7–0 PHI
- 05:17 PHI – Wes Ours 16 yd pass from Chris Jackson (Connor Hughes kick) – 14–0 PHI
- 03:35 NY – Jason Willis 11 yd pass from Aaron Garcia (Steve Azar kick) – 14–7 PHI

2nd Quarter:

- 13:13 PHI – Larry Brackins 3 yd pass from Matt D'Orazio (Connor Hughes kick) – 21–7 PHI
- 09:50 NY – Steve Azar 27 yd field goal – 21–10 PHI
- 06:26 PHI – Larry Brackins 10 yd pass from Matt D'Orazio (Connor Hughes kick) – 28–10 PHI
- 00:55 PHI – Chris Jackson 15 yd pass from Matt D'Orazio (Connor Hughes kick) – 35–10 PHI
- 00:22 PHI – Rod Davis 32 yd interception return (Connor Hughes kick) – 42–10 PHI

3rd Quarter:

- 10:27 NY – Juston Wood 4 yd run (Steve Azar kick) – 42–17 PHI
- 05:07 PHI – Connor Hughes 34 yd field goal – 45–17 PHI
- 01:54 PHI – Eddie Moten 52 yd interception return (Connor Hughes kick) – 52–17 PHI

4th Quarter:

- 11:19 NY – Idris Price 1 yd run (Steve Azar kick failed) – 52–23 PHI
- 06:38 PHI – Larry Brackins 17 yd pass from Glen Gauntt (Connor Hughes kick) – 59–23 PHI
- 00:53 NY – John Walker 9 yd interception return (Steve Azar kick) – 59–30 PHI
- Officials: Referee: Bill LeMonnier; Umpire: Jeff Carr; Linesman: Greg Shields; Line judge: Dave Chesney; Back judge: Billy Beckett
- Offensive Player of the Game: N/A
- Defensive Player of the Game: N/A
- Ironman Player of the Game: N/A

== Playoffs ==
=== National Conference Wild Card: at (3) Dallas Desperados ===
Quarter	1	2	3	4	Total
(6) NY	14	21	14	28	77
(3) DAL	7	21	7	28	63

at American Airlines Center, Dallas, Texas

- Date: June 27
- Game time: 7:30 PM EST
- Game attendance: 10,076

Game information

1st Quarter:

- 08:10 DAL – PETTIS, Will 6 yd pass from DOLEZEL, Clint (HAMILTON, Remy kick) – 7–0 DAL
- 04:26 NY – MOSS, Terry 11 yd pass from GARCIA, Aaron (AZAR, Steve kick) – 7–7
- 00:43 NY – SWAYNE, Kevin 6 yd pass from GARCIA, Aaron (AZAR, Steve kick) – 14–7 NY

2nd Quarter:

- 11:33 DAL – ARMSTRONG, Anth 3 yd pass from DOLEZEL, Clint (HAMILTON, Remy kick) – 14–14
- 07:22 DAL – PETTIS, Will 3 yd run (HAMILTON, Remy kick) – 21–14 DAL
- 04:58 NY – SWAYNE, Kevin 12 yd pass from GARCIA, Aaron (AZAR, Steve kick) – 21–21
- 03:22 DAL – PETTIS, Will 5 yd pass from DOLEZEL, Clint (HAMILTON, Remy kick) – 28–21 DAL
- 01:02 NY – ANTHONY, Chris 6 yd pass from GARCIA, Aaron (AZAR, Steve kick) – 28–28
- 00:06 NY – MOSS, Terry 18 yd pass from GARCIA, Aaron (AZAR, Steve kick) – 35–28 NY

3rd Quarter:

- 11:40 DAL – WHITE, Josh 2 yd run (HAMILTON, Remy kick) – 35–35
- 06:21 NY – SWAYNE, Kevin 10 yd pass from GARCIA, Aaron (AZAR, Steve kick) – 42–35 NY
- 03:31 NY – MOSS, Terry 28 yd pass from GARCIA, Aaron (AZAR, Steve kick) – 49–35 NY

4th Quarter:

- 11:17 NY – SWAYNE, Kevin 14 yd pass from GARCIA, Aaron (AZAR, Steve kick) – 56–35 NY
- 09:29 DAL – ARMSTRONG, Anth 26 yd pass from DOLEZEL, Clint (HAMILTON, Remy kick) – 56–42 NY
- 07:34 NY – PRICE, Idris 7 yd run (AZAR, Steve kick) – 63–42 NY
- 04:29 DAL – THURMAN, Andrae 4 yd pass from DOLEZEL, Clint (HAMILTON, Remy kick) – 63–49 NY
- 03:29 NY – ANTHONY, Chris 24 yd pass from GARCIA, Aaron (AZAR, Steve kick) – 70–49 NY
- 01:10 DAL – PETTIS, Will 5 yd pass from DOLEZEL, Clint (HAMILTON, Remy kick) – 70–56 NY
- 00:52 NY – PRICE, Idris 12 yd run (AZAR, Steve kick) – 77–56 NY
- 00:24 DAL – THURMAN, Andrae 7 yd pass from DOLEZEL, Clint (HAMILTON, Remy kick) – 77–63 NY
- Officials: Referee: Riley Johnson; Umpire: Al Granado; Linesman: Julian Mapp; Line judge: David Meslow; Back judge: Rich Wilborn
- Offensive Player of the Game: Aaron Garcia (NY)
- Defensive Player of the Game: John Walker (NY)
- Ironman Player of the Game: Will Pettis (DAL)

=== National Conference Divisional: at (1) Philadelphia Soul ===
Quarter	1	2	3	4	Total
(6) NY	6	19	0	23	48
(1) PHI	16	7	7	19	49

at Wachovia Center, Philadelphia, Pennsylvania

- Date: July 5
- Game time: 7:00 PM EST
- Game attendance: 16,102

Game information

1st Quarter:

- 13:13 PHI – Chris Jackson 37 yd pass from Matt D'Orazio (Connor Hughes kick) – 7–0 PHI
- 06:49 NY – Kevin Swayne 6 yd pass from Aaron Garcia (AZAR kick failed) – 7–6 PHI
- 03:34 PHI – HOLMES 14 yd pass from Matt D'Orazio (Connor Hughes kick) – 14–6 PHI
- 01:41 PHI – Gabe Nyenhuis safety – 16–6 PHI

2nd Quarter:

- 14:53 NY – Kevin Swayne 27 yd pass from Aaron Garcia (AZAR kick) – 16–13 PHI
- 03:10 NY – Henry Taylor safety – 16–15 PHI
- 01:37 NY – Kevin Swayne 14 yd pass from Aaron Garcia (AZAR kick) – 22–16 NY
- 00:12 PHI – Chris Jackson 7 yd pass from Matt D'Orazio (Connor Hughes kick) – 23–22 PHI
- 00:00 NY – AZAR 44 yd field goal – 25–23 NY

3rd Quarter:

- 07:09 PHI – Clifton Smith 1 yd run (Connor Hughes kick) – 30–25 PHI

4th Quarter:

- 14:55 NY – AZAR 26 yd field goal – 30–28 PHI
- 13:03 PHI – Chris Jackson 3 yd pass from Matt D'Orazio (Connor Hughes kick) – 37–28 PHI
- 10:10 NY – Kevin Swayne 25 yd pass from Aaron Garcia (AZAR kick) – 37–35 PHI
- 09:03 PHI – Chris Jackson 11 yd pass from Matt D'Orazio (Connor Hughes kick failed) – 43–35 PHI
- 05:30 NY – Kevin Swayne 5 yd pass from Aaron Garcia (Aaron Garcia pass intcpt) – 43–41 PHI
- 00:57 NY – Keron Henry 2 yd run (AZAR kick) – 48–43 NY
- 00:00 PHI – Larry Brackins 28 yd pass from Matt D'Orazio – 49–48 PHI
- Officials: Referee: Bill Athan; Umpire: Matt Jordan; Linesman: Bill Ward; Line judge: R.J. Detillier; Back judge: James Cole
- Offensive Player of the Game: Gabe Nyenhuis (PHI)
- Defensive Player of the Game: Clifton Smith (PHI)
- Ironman Player of the Game: Chris Jackson (PHI)
