= 2008 Columbus Destroyers season =

Arena Football League team season

- Owner: John H. McConnell
- General manager: Jim Renacci
- Head coach: Doug Kay
- Home stadium: Nationwide Arena

Results
- Record: 3–13
- Division place: 5th
- Playoffs: Did not qualify

The 2008 Columbus Destroyers season was the 10th season for the franchise, their fifth season in Columbus. The Destroyers finished the season tied for the worst record in the league.

== Standings ==
Eastern Division
Team	W	L	PCT	PF	PA	DIV	CONF	Home	Away
Philadelphia Soul^{(1)}	13	3	.813	992	810	7–1	9–2	7–1	6–2
Dallas Desperados^{(3)}	12	4	.750	861	798	6–2	9–2	6–2	6–2
Cleveland Gladiators^{(4)}	9	7	.563	901	895	4–4	5–6	6–2	3–5
New York Dragons^{(6)}	8	8	.500	822	819	2–6	4–7	5–3	3–5
Columbus Destroyers	3	13	.188	750	893	1–7	2–10	2–6	1–7

== Regular season schedule ==
Week	Date	Opponent	Result	Record	Location	Attendance	Recap
1	March 2	at Colorado Crush	L 47–50	0–1	Pepsi Center	9,265	Recap
2	March 7	at Dallas Desperados	L 36–46	0–2	American Airlines Center	12,432	Recap
3	March 15	Cleveland Gladiators	L 57–59	0–3	Nationwide Arena	15,946	Recap
4	March 21	at Utah Blaze	W 52–49	1–3	EnergySolutions Arena	13,717	Recap
5	March 29	Orlando Predators	L 44–47	1–4	Nationwide Arena	13,035	Recap
6	April 5	Tampa Bay Storm	W 51–49	2–4	Nationwide Arena	14,256	Recap
7	April 13	at New York Dragons	L 44–62	2–5	Nassau Coliseum	7,346	Recap
8	April 21	Philadelphia Soul	L 55–76	2–6	Nationwide Arena	14,974	Recap
9	Bye Week						
10	May 3	Dallas Desperados	L 45–48	2–7	Nationwide Arena	14,310	Recap
11	May 10	at Kansas City Brigade	L 43–59	2–8	Sprint Center	12,736	Recap
12	May 17	at Philadelphia Soul	L 43–51	2–9	Wachovia Center	18,741	Recap
13	May 24	New York Dragons	W 43–41	3–9	Nationwide Arena	12,842	Recap
14	May 30	at New Orleans VooDoo	L 61–83	3–10	New Orleans Arena	13,206	Recap
15	June 7	Georgia Force	L 34–63	3–11	Nationwide Arena	12,948	Recap
16	June 14	Grand Rapids Rampage	L 60–63	3–12	Nationwide Arena	12,831	Recap
17	June 21	at Cleveland Gladiators	L 35–47	3–13	Quicken Loans Arena	14,397	Recap

== Roster ==
2008 Columbus Destroyers roster
Quarterbacks: Currently vacant; Fullbacks: Currently vacant; Wide receivers: Currently vacant	Offensive linemen: Currently vacant; Defensive linemen: Currently vacant	Linebackers: Currently vacant; Defensive backs: Currently vacant; Kickers: Currently vacant	Injured reserve: Currently vacant; Other league exempt: Currently vacant; League suspension: Currently vacant; Refused to report: Currently vacant; Inactive reserve: Currently vacant; Recallable reassignment: Currently vacant; Rookies in italics updated July 18, 2008; 0 Active, 0 Inactive

== Regular season ==
=== Week 1: at Colorado Crush ===
Quarter	1	2	3	4	Total
CLB	14	7	19	7	47
COL	14	10	13	13	50

at Pepsi Center, Denver, Colorado

- Date: March 2
- Game time: 4:00 PM EST
- Game attendance: 9,265

Game information

1st Quarter:

- 08:53 COL – Willie Quinnie 12 yd pass from John Dutton (Clay Rush kick) – 7–0 COL
- 06:01 CLB – Derek Lee 7 yd pass from Matt Nagy (Mark Lewis kick) – 7–7
- 04:39 COL – Ben Nelson 22 yd pass from John Dutton (Clay Rush kick) – 14–7 COL
- 01:34 CLB – Derek Lee 14 yd pass from Matt Nagy (Mark Lewis kick) – 14–14

2nd Quarter:

- 06:45 COL – Clay Rush 54 yd field goal – 17–14 COL
- 00:51 CLB – Harold Wells 2 yd run (Mark Lewis kick) – 21–17 CLB
- 00:04 COL – Ben Nelson 2 yd pass from John Dutton (Clay Rush kick) – 24–21 COL

3rd Quarter:

- 12:55 CLB – Rasheed Marshall 33 yd pass from Matt Nagy (Mark Lewis kick failed) – 27–24 CLB
- 11:10 COL – Willie Quinnie 11 yd pass from John Dutton (Clay Rush kick failed) – 30–27 COL
- 05:26 CLB – Calvin Russell 4 yd run (Mark Lewis kick failed) – 33–30 CLB
- 02:32 COL – Ben Nelson 7 yd pass from John Dutton (Clay Rush kick) – 37–33 COL
- 00:45 CLB – Harold Wells 1 yd run (Mark Lewis kick) – 40–37 CLB

4th Quarter:

- 11:48 COL – Willie Quinnie 3 yd pass from John Dutton (Clay Rush kick failed) – 43–40 COL
- 03:27 COL – Jason Harmon 3 yd run (Clay Rush kick) – 50–40 COL
- 00:34 CLB – Derek Lee 4 yd pass from Matt Nagy (Mark Lewis kick) – 50–47 COL
- Officials: Referee: Dave Lambros; Umpire: Doug Wilson; Linesman: Kelly Saalfield; Line judge: Brian Matthew; Back judge: Rich Wilborn
- Offensive Player of the Game: N/A
- Defensive Player of the Game: N/A
- Ironman Player of the Game: N/A

=== Week 2: at Dallas Desperados ===
Quarter	1	2	3	4	Total
CLB	7	10	7	12	36
DAL	14	19	6	7	46

at American Airlines Center, Dallas, Texas

- Date: March 7
- Game time: 8:30 PM MST
- Game attendance: 12,432

Game information

1st Quarter:

- 09:04 DAL – SANDERS, Chris 4 yd run (HAMILTON, Remy kick) – 7–0 DAL
- 04:29 DAL – NASH, Marcus 26 yd pass from SANDERS, Chris (HAMILTON, Remy kick) – 14–0 DAL
- 02:36 CLB – LEE, Derek 40 yd pass from NAGY, Matt (LEWIS, Mark kick) – 14–7 DAL

2nd Quarter:

- 12:52 DAL – NASH, Marcus 15 yd pass from SANDERS, Chris (HAMILTON, Remy kick) – 21–7 DAL
- 11:08 CLB – LEE, Derek 42 yd pass from NAGY, Matt (LEWIS, Mark kick) – 21–14 DAL
- 07:28 DAL – NASH, Marcus 26 yd pass from SANDERS, Chris (HAMILTON, Remy kick failed) – 27–14 DAL
- 00:24 CLB – LEWIS, Mark 31 yd field goal – 27–17 DAL
- 00:10 DAL – PETTIS, Will 1 yd pass from SANDERS, Chris (HAMILTON, Remy kick failed) – 33–17 DAL

3rd Quarter:

- 09:18 CLB – LEE, Derek 3 yd pass from NAGY, Matt (LEWIS, Mark kick) – 33–24 DAL
- 06:08 DAL – PETTIS, Will 1 yd run (HAMILTON, Remy kick failed) – 39–24 DAL

4th Quarter:

- 14:53 CLB – WELLS, Harold 9 yd run (LEWIS, Mark kick failed) – 39–30 DAL
- 10:11 DAL – BUSH, Josh 3 yd pass from SANDERS, Chris (HAMILTON, Remy kick) – 46–30 DAL
- 03:38 CLB – LEE, Derek 10 yd pass from NAGY, Matt (MARSHALL, Rashe rush failed) – 46–36 DAL
- Officials: Referee: Tom McCabe; Umpire: Rick Podraza; Linesman: Rod Pearson; Line judge: Dana McKenzie; Back judge: Scott Helverson
- Offensive Player of the Game: Chris Sanders (DAL)
- Defensive Player of the Game: Bobby Perry (DAL)
- Ironman Player of the Game: Will Pettis (DAL)

=== Week 3: vs. Cleveland Gladiators ===
Quarter	1	2	3	4	Total
CLE	14	9	19	17	59
CLB	10	21	7	19	57

at Nationwide Arena, Columbus, Ohio

- Date: March 15
- Game time: 7:00 PM EST
- Game attendance: TBD

Game information

1st Quarter:

- 08:45 CLB – LEWIS, Mark 27 yd field goal – 3–0 CLB
- 05:07 CLE – JACKSON, Marlion 10 yd run (BALL, Jason kick) – 7–3 CLE
- 02:24 CLB – LEE, Derek 6 yd pass from NAGY, Matt (LEWIS, Mark kick) – 10–7 CLB
- 00:11 CLE – PHILYAW, Raymond 7 yd run (BALL, Jason kick) – 14–10 CLE

2nd Quarter:

- 12:20 CLB – LEE, Derek 2 yd pass from NAGY, Matt (LEWIS, Mark kick) – 17–14 CLB
- 07:41 CLE – BALL, Jason 26 yd field goal – 17–17
- 04:55 CLB – WELLS, Harold 8 yd run (LEWIS, Mark kick) – 24–17 CLB
- 02:16 CLE – AMEY, Otis 20 yd pass from PHILYAW, Raymond (BALL, Jason kick failed) – 24–23 CLB
- 00:05 CLB – WELLS, Harold 3 yd pass from NAGY, Matt (LEWIS, Mark kick) – 31–23 CLE

3rd Quarter:

- 12:47 CLE – AMEY, Otis 24 yd pass from PHILYAW, Raymond (BALL, Jason kick failed) – 31–29 CLB
- 08:46 CLE – JACKSON, Marlion 20 yd run (BALL, Jason kick failed) – 35–31 CLE
- 03:49 CLB – MARSHALL, Rasheed 4 yd pass from NAGY, Matt (LEWIS, Mark kick) – 38–35 CLB
- 01:14 CLE – AMEY, Otis 6 yd pass from PHILYAW, Raymond (BALL, Jason kick) – 42–38 CLE

4th Quarter:

- 14:38 CLB – WELLS, Harold 20 yd pass from NAGY, Matt (LEWIS, Mark kick failed) – 44–42 CLB
- 12:45 CLE – REDD, Robert 8 yd pass from PHILYAW, Raymond (BALL, Jason kick) – 49–44 CLE
- 10:12 CLB – MARSHALL, Rasheed 34 yd pass from NAGY, Matt (LEWIS, Mark kick) – 51–49 CLB
- 06:54 CLE – BALL, Jason 19 yd field goal – 52–51 CLE
- 00:43 CLE – REDD, Robert 17 yd pass from PHILYAW, Raymond (BALL, Jason kick) – 59–51 CLE
- 00:22 CLB – LEE, Derek 33 yd pass from NAGY, Matt (NAGY, Matt pass failed) – 59–57 CLE
- Officials: Referee: Bill LeMonnier; Umpire: Jeff Carr; Linesman: Greg Shields; Line judge: Dave Chesney; Back judge: Billy Beckett
- Offensive Player of the Game: Otis Amey (CLE)
- Defensive Player of the Game: Robert Freeman (CLB)
- Ironman Player of the Game: N/A

=== Week 4: at Utah Blaze ===
Quarter	1	2	3	4	Total
CLB	13	7	14	18	52
UTA	14	21	0	14	49

at EnergySolutions Arena, Salt Lake City, Utah

- Date: March 21
- Game time: 9:00 PM EST
- Game attendance: N/A

Game information

1st Quarter:

- 13:11 UTA – MCKELVEY 31 yd pass from GERMAINE (AZAR kick) – 7–0 UTA
- 11:01 UTA – MCKELVEY 23 yd pass from GERMAINE (AZAR kick) – 14–0 UTA
- 06:18 CLB – SHELLEY 1 yd pass from NAGY (LEWIS kick failed) – 14–6 UTA
- 01:47 CLB – NEAL 30 yd interception return (LEWIS kick) – 14–13 UTA

2nd Quarter:

- 12:44 UTA – WHITTAKER 10 yd pass from GERMAINE (AZAR kick) – 21–13 UTA
- 01:54 UTA – WHITTAKER 15 yd pass from GERMAINE (AZAR kick) – 28–13 UTA
- 00:54 CLB – MARSHALL 54 yd kickoff return (LEWIS kick) – 28–20 UTA
- 00:05 UTA – BOONE 7 yd pass from GERMAINE (AZAR kick) – 35–20 UTA

3rd Quarter:

- 11:05 CLB – WELLS 3 yd run (LEWIS kick) – 35–27 UTA
- 06:48 CLB – WELLS 4 yd run (LEWIS kick) – 35–34 UTA

4th Quarter:

- 14:52 UTA – WHITTAKER 5 yd pass from GERMAINE (AZAR kick) – 42–32 UTA
- 11:50 CLB – LEE 11 yd pass from NAGY (WELLS pass from NAGY) – 42–42
- 08:19 UTA – WHITTAKER 4 yd run (AZAR kick) – 49–42 UTA
- 03:36 CLB – MARSHALL 17 yd pass from NAGY (LEWIS kick) – 49–49
- 00:00 CLB – LEWIS 35 yd field goal – 52–49 CLB
- Officials: Referee: Bill McCabe; Umpire: Mike Delaney; Linesman: Shawn Hochuli; Line judge: Dirk Bell; Back judge: Jimmy Buchanan
- Offensive Player of the Game: N/A
- Defensive Player of the Game: N/A
- Ironman Player of the Game: N/A

=== Week 5: vs. Orlando Predators ===
Quarter	1	2	3	4	Total
ORL	7	16	7	17	47
CLB	10	6	14	14	44

at Nationwide Arena, Columbus, Ohio

- Date: March 29
- Game time: 7:00 PM EST
- Game attendance: N/A

Game information

1st Quarter:

- 11:23 CLB – LEWIS, Mark 43 yd field goal – 3–0 CLB
- 10:06 ORL – Johnson, Ron 31 yd pass from Stafford, Shane (Vaughn, John kick) – 7–3 ORL
- 03:05 CLB – WELLS, Harold 1 yd run (LEWIS, Mark kick) – 10–7 CLB

2nd Quarter:

- 13:52 ORL – Gessner, Chas 4 yd pass from Stafford, Shane (Vaughn, John kick) – 14–10 ORL
- 12:02 ORL – Schroeder, Rob safety – 16–10 ORL
- 07:21 ORL – Moye-Moore, M. 1 yd run (Vaughn, John kick) – 23–10 ORL
- 03:31 CLB – LEE, Derek 12 yd pass from NAGY, Matt (LEWIS, Mark kick failed) – 23–16 ORL

3rd Quarter:

- 09:58 CLB – LEE, Derek 32 yd pass from NAGY, Matt (LEWIS, Mark kick) – 23–23
- 06:27 ORL – Moye-Moore, M. 1 yd run (Vaughn, John kick) – 30–23 ORL
- 00:58 CLB – WELLS, Harold 2 yd run (LEWIS, Mark kick) – 30–30

4th Quarter:

- 14:05 ORL – Gessner, Chas 3 yd pass from Stafford, Shane (Vaughn, John kick) – 37–30 ORL
- 10:56 CLB – NAGY, Matt 3 yd run (LEWIS, Mark kick) – 37–37
- 06:46 ORL – Hill, Charles 4 yd pass from Stafford, Shane (Vaughn, John kick) – 44–37 ORL
- 03:03 CLB – WELLS, Harold 6 yd pass from NAGY, Matt (LEWIS, Mark kick) – 44–44
- 00:00 ORL – Vaughn, John 32 yd field goal – 47–44 ORL
- Officials: Referee: Pat Garvey; Umpire: Paul King; Linesman: Bill Ward; Line judge: Bob McElwee; Back judge: James DeBell
- Offensive Player of the Game: N/A
- Defensive Player of the Game: N/A
- Ironman Player of the Game: N/A

=== Week 6: vs. Tampa Bay Storm ===
Quarter	1	2	3	4	Total
TB	14	7	7	21	49
CLB	7	14	3	27	51

at Nationwide Arena, Columbus, Ohio

- Date: April 5
- Game time: 7:00 PM EST
- Game attendance: 14,256

Game information

1st Quarter:

- 10:54 TB – Saunders, David 7 yd pass from Deitz, Brett (Marler, Seth kick) – 7–0 TB
- 05:16 CLB – LEE, Derek 3 yd pass from NAGY, Matt (LEWIS, Mark kick) – 7–7
- 02:30 TB – Edwards, Hank 5 yd pass from Deitz, Brett (Marler, Seth kick) – 14–7 TB

2nd Quarter:

- 13:22 CLB – LEE, Derek 8 yd pass from NAGY, Matt (LEWIS, Mark kick) – 14–14
- 10:28 TB – Edwards, Hank 10 yd pass from Deitz, Brett (Marler, Seth kick) – 21–14 TB
- 04:41 CLB – WELLS, Harold 4 yd pass from NAGY, Matt (LEWIS, Mark kick) – 21–21

3rd Quarter:

- 11:15 CLB – LEWIS, Mark 21 yd field goal – 24–21 CLB
- 05:27 TB – Kaleita, Tom 2 yd pass from Deitz, Brett (Marler, Seth kick) – 28–24 TB

4th Quarter:

- 14:55 CLB – LEE, Derek 15 yd pass from NAGY, Matt (LEWIS, Mark kick) – 31–28 CLB
- 09:34 TB – Brown, Marvin 7 yd run (Marler, Seth kick) – 35–31 TB
- 06:37 CLB – LEE, Derek 4 yd pass from NAGY, Matt (LEWIS, Mark kick failed) – 37–35 CLB
- 00:45 CLB – RUSSELL, Calvin 33 yd pass from NAGY, Matt (LEWIS, Mark kick) – 44–35 CLB
- 00:24 TB – Saunders, David 22 yd pass from Deitz, Brett (Marler, Seth kick) – 44–42 CLB
- 00:20 CLB – COGGINS, Nate 8 yd kickoff return (LEWIS, Mark kick) – 51–42 CLB
- 00:00 TB – Saunders, David 9 yd pass from Deitz, Brett (Marler, Seth kick) – 51–49 CLB
- Officials: Referee: Riley Johnson; Umpire: Paul Frerking; Linesman: Neil Brunner; Line judge: Paul Engelberts; Back judge: Tony Lombardo
- Offensive Player of the Game: N/A
- Defensive Player of the Game: N/A
- Ironman Player of the Game: N/A

=== Week 7: at New York Dragons ===
Quarter	1	2	3	4	Total
CLB	3	14	7	20	44
NY	7	21	14	20	62

at Nassau Veterans Memorial Coliseum, Uniondale, New York

- Date: April 13
- Game time: 3:00 PM EST
- Game attendance: 7,346

Game information

1st Quarter:

- 09:27 CLB – Mark Lewis 24 yd field goal – 3–0 CLB
- 08:13 NY – Kevin Swayne 21 yd pass from Aaron Garcia (Chris Onorato kick) – 7–3 NY

2nd Quarter:

- 07:57 NY – Kevin Swayne 1 yd pass from Aaron Garcia (Chris Onorato kick) – 14–3 NY
- 07:10 CLB – Rasheed Marshall 57 yd kickoff return (Mark Lewis kick) – 14–10 NY
- 02:50 NY – Jason Willis 4 yd pass from Aaron Garcia (Chris Onorato kick) – 21–10 NY
- 00:43 CLB – Derek Lee 15 yd pass from Matt Nagy (Mark Lewis kick) – 21–17 NY
- 00:09 NY – Kevin Swayne 8 yd pass from Aaron Garcia (Chris Onorato kick) – 28–17 NY

3rd Quarter:

- 13:13 NY – Chris Anthony 17 yd pass from Aaron Garcia (Chris Onorato kick) – 35–17 NY
- 09:47 CLB – Derek Lee 10 yd pass from Matt Nagy (Mark Lewis kick) – 35–24 NY
- 05:27 NY – Jason Willis 28 yd pass from Aaron Garcia (Chris Onorato kick) – 42–24 NY

4th Quarter:

- 06:50 NY – Chris Anthony 5 yd pass from Aaron Garcia (Chris Onorato kick failed) – 48–24 NY
- 04:11 CLB – Derek Lee 36 yd pass from Matt Nagy (Mark Lewis kick) – 48–31 NY
- 03:06 NY – Chris Anthony 8 yd pass from Aaron Garcia (Chris Onorato kick) – 55–31 NY
- 01:38 CLB – Calvin Russell 39 yd pass from Matt Nagy (Matt Nagy pass failed) – 55–37 NY
- 00:35 NY – Juston Wood 5 yd run (Chris Onorato kick) – 62–37 NY
- 00:18 CLB – Rasheed Marshall 38 yd pass from Matt Nagy (Mark Lewis kick) – 62–44 NY
- Officials: Referee: Tom McCabe; Umpire: Rick Podraza; Linesman: Rod Pearson; Line judge: Dana McKenzie; Back judge: Scott Helverson
- Offensive Player of the Game: Aaron Garcia (NY)
- Defensive Player of the Game: Henry Taylor (NY)
- Ironman Player of the Game: Rasheed Marshall (CLB)

=== Week 8: vs. Philadelphia Soul ===
Quarter	1	2	3	4	Total
PHI	21	21	20	14	76
CLB	21	14	7	13	55

at Nationwide Arena, Columbus, Ohio

- Date: April 21
- Game time: 8:00 PM EST
- Game attendance: 14,974

Game information

1st Quarter:

- 14:22 CLB – RUSSELL, Calvin 42 yd pass from NAGY, Matt (LEWIS, Mark kick) – 7–0 CLB
- 13:10 PHI – BRACKINS, Larry 39 yd pass from GRAZIANI, Tony (HUGHES, Connor kick) – 7–7
- 11:54 CLB – LEE, Derek 45 yd pass from NAGY, Matt (LEWIS, Mark kick) – 14–7 CLB
- 09:27 PHI – BRACKINS, Larry 12 yd pass from GRAZIANI, Tony (HUGHES, Connor kick) – 14–14
- 08:25 CLB – JOHNSON, C.J. 45 yd pass from NAGY, Matt (LEWIS, Mark kick) – 21–14 CLB
- 04:41 PHI – BOGLE, Phil 8 yd pass from GRAZIANI, Tony (HUGHES, Connor kick) – 21–21

2nd Quarter:

- 12:33 PHI – JACKSON, Chris 4 yd pass from GRAZIANI, Tony (HUGHES, Connor kick) – 28–21 PHI
- 09:20 CLB – WELLS, Harold 5 yd run (LEWIS, Mark kick) – 28–28
- 06:14 PHI – JACKSON, Chris 12 yd pass from D'ORAZIO, Matt (HUGHES, Connor kick) – 35–28 PHI
- 01:26 CLB – JOHNSON, C.J. 20 yd pass from NAGY, Matt (LEWIS, Mark kick) – 35–35
- 00:00 PHI – JACKSON, Chris 4 yd pass from D'ORAZIO, Matt (HUGHES, Connor kick) – 42–35 PHI

3rd Quarter:

- 11:27 PHI – D'ORAZIO, Matt 4 yd run (HUGHES, Connor kick blocked) – 48–35 PHI
- 07:55 PHI – WATTS, Darius 11 yd pass from D'ORAZIO, Matt (HUGHES, Connor kick) – 55–35 PHI
- 04:37 CLB – LEE, Derek 9 yd pass from NAGY, Matt (LEWIS, Mark kick) – 55–42 PHI
- 01:48 PHI – BRACKINS, Larry 24 yd pass from D'ORAZIO, Matt (HUGHES, Connor kick) – 62–42 PHI

4th Quarter:

- 09:17 PHI – BOGLE, Phil 4 yd pass from D'ORAZIO, Matt (HUGHES, Connor kick) – 69–42 PHI
- 06:09 CLB – RUSSELL, Calvin 27 yd pass from NAGY, Matt (WELLS, Harold pass failed) – 69–48 PHI
- 05:03 PHI – OURS, Wes 8 yd run (HUGHES, Connor kick) – 76–48 PHI
- 01:05 CLB – THOMPSON, Leroy 1 yd pass from NAGY, Matt (LEWIS, Mark kick) – 76–55 PHI
- Officials: Referee: Dave Cutaia; Umpire: Al Granado; Linesman: Mike McCabe; Line judge: Art Lucky; Back judge: James Cole
- Offensive Player of the Game: Larry Brackins (PHI)
- Defensive Player of the Game: Anthony Dunn (PHI)
- Ironman Player of the Game: N/A

=== Week 9 ===
Bye Week

=== Week 10: vs. Dallas Desperados ===
Quarter	1	2	3	4	Total
DAL	14	6	14	14	48
CLB	13	20	6	6	45

at Nationwide Arena, Columbus, Ohio

- Date: May 3
- Game time: 7:00 PM EST
- Game attendance: 14,310

Game information

1st Quarter:

- 12:02 CLB – LEE, Derek 7 yd pass from NAGY, Matt (LEWIS, Mark kick) – 7–0 CLB
- 09:11 DAL – PETTIS, Will 12 yd pass from DOLEZEL, Clint (HAMILTON, Remy kick) – 7–7
- 07:55 CLB – JOHNSON, C.J. 9 yd pass from NAGY, Matt (LEWIS, Mark kick failed) – 13–7 CLB
- 03:14 DAL – NASH, Marcus 3 yd pass from DOLEZEL, Clint (HAMILTON, Remy kick) – 14–13 DAL

2nd Quarter:

- 10:34 CLB – NAGY, Matt 1 yd run (LEWIS, Mark kick) – 20–14 CLB
- 06:23 CLB – NAGY, Matt 1 yd run (LEWIS, Mark kick) – 27–14 CLB
- 04:00 DAL – PETTIS, Will 19 yd pass from DOLEZEL, Clint (HAMILTON, Remy kick failed) – 27–20 CLB
- 00:07 CLB – LAZARE-SAUNDERS 1 yd pass from NAGY, Matt (LEWIS, Mark kick failed) – 33–20 CLB

3rd Quarter:

- 11:57 DAL – NASH, Marcus 39 yd pass from DOLEZEL, Clint (HAMILTON, Remy kick) – 33–27 CLB
- 09:16 CLB – LEE, Derek 34 yd pass from NAGY, Matt (LEWIS, Mark kick blocked) – 39–27 CLB
- 07:05 DAL – NASH, Marcus 26 yd pass from DOLEZEL, Clint (HAMILTON, Remy kick) – 39–34 CLB

4th Quarter:

- 13:31 DAL – NASH, Marcus 17 yd pass from DOLEZEL, Clint (HAMILTON, Remy kick) – 41–39 DAL
- 00:40 CLB – WELLS, Harold 3 yd run (NAGY, Matt pass failed) – 45–41 CLB
- 00:15 DAL – PETTIS, Will 9 yd pass from DOLEZEL, Clint (HAMILTON, Remy kick) – 48–45 DAL
- Officials: Referee: Dave Lambros; Umpire: Doug Wilson; Linesman: Kelly Saalfield; Line judge: Brian Matthew; Back judge: Rich Wilborn
- Offensive Player of the Game: N/A
- Defensive Player of the Game: N/A
- Ironman Player of the Game: N/A

=== Week 11: at Kansas City Brigade ===
Quarter	1	2	3	4	Total
CLB	7	14	7	15	43
KC	14	14	14	17	59

at Sprint Center, Kansas City, Missouri

- Date: May 10
- Game time: 6:00 PM EST
- Game attendance: 12,736

Game information

1st Quarter:

- 12:58 KC – Ces'are Manning 22 yd pass from D. Bryant (Peter Martinez kick) – 7–0 KC
- 07:44 CLB – Harold Wells 2 yd run (Mark Lewis kick) – 7–7
- 03:17 KC – Mike Horacek 17 yd pass from D. Bryant (Peter Martinez kick) – 14–7 KC

2nd Quarter:

- 13:36 CLB – C.J. Johnson 17 yd pass from Matt Nagy (Mark Lewis kick) – 14–14
- 08:07 KC – D. Bryant 1 yd run (Peter Martinez kick) – 21–14 KC
- 05:12 CLB – C.J. Johnson 45 yd pass from Matt Nagy (Mark Lewis kick) – 21–21
- 00:02 KC – Jamarr Ward 4 yd pass from D. Bryant (Peter Martinez kick) – 28–21 KC

3rd Quarter:

- 11:19 KC – Dawan Moss 5 yd run (Peter Martinez kick) – 35–21 KC
- 09:22 CLB – Calvin Russell 46 yd pass from Matt Nagy (Mark Lewis kick) – 35–28 KC
- 08:24 KC – Jerel Myers 56 yd kickoff return (Peter Martinez kick) – 42–28 KC

4th Quarter:

- 14:56 KC – Jerel Myers 12 yd pass from D. Bryant (Peter Martinez kick) – 49–28 KC
- 08:47 KC – Dawan Moss 3 yd run (Peter Martinez kick) – 56–28 KC
- 05:07 CLB – Derek Lee 18 yd pass from Matt Nagy (Mark Lewis kick) – 56–35 KC
- 02:41 KC – Peter Martinez 22 yd field goal – 59–35 KC
- 00:53 CLB – Derek Lee 8 yd pass from Matt Nagy (Matt Nagy rush) – 59–43 KC
- Officials: Referee: Riley Johnson; Umpire: Rick Lowe; Linesman: Julian Mapp; Line judge: RG Detillier; Back judge: Bud McCleskey
- Offensive Player of the Game: Duke Bryant (KC)
- Defensive Player of the Game: Gillis Wilson (KC)
- Ironman Player of the Game: Jerel Myers (KC)

=== Week 12: at Philadelphia Soul ===
Quarter	1	2	3	4	Total
CLB	6	15	7	15	43
PHI	7	14	23	7	51

at Wachovia Spectrum, Philadelphia, Pennsylvania

- Date: May 17
- Game time: 7:00 PM EST
- Game attendance: 18,741

Game information

1st Quarter:

- 08:47 PHI – Chris Jackson 4 yd pass from Matt D'Orazio (Connor Hughes kick) – 7–0 PHI
- 00:35 CLB – Harold Wells 1 yd run (Justin Zwick rush failed) – 7–6 PHI

2nd Quarter:

- 06:25 CLB – C.J. Johnson 20 yd pass from Matt Nagy (Mark Lewis kick) – 13–7 CLB
- 05:07 PHI – Chris Jackson 33 yd pass from Matt D'Orazio (Connor Hughes kick) – 14–13 PHI
- 00:33 CLB – Matt Nagy 1 yd run (Harold Wells rush) – 21–14 CLB
- 00:19 PHI – Larry Brackins 43 yd pass from Matt D'Orazio (Connor Hughes kick) – 21–21

3rd Quarter:

- 14:21 PHI – HOLMES 18 yd pass from Matt D'Orazio (Connor Hughes kick) – 28–21 PHI
- 08:23 CLB – Rasheed Marshall 6 yd run (Mark Lewis kick) – 28–28
- 05:21 PHI – Larry Brackins 7 yd pass from Matt D'Orazio (Connor Hughes kick) – 35–28 PHI
- 03:42 PHI – Gabe Nyenhuis safety – 37–28 PHI
- 01:49 PHI – Chris Jackson 26 yd pass from Matt D'Orazio (Connor Hughes kick) – 44–28 PHI

4th Quarter:

- 12:10 CLB – Derek Lee 11 yd pass from Matt Nagy (Mark Lewis kick) – 44–35 PHI
- 09:10 PHI – Phil Bogle 21 yd pass from Matt D'Orazio (Connor Hughes kick) – 51–35 PHI
- 05:23 CLB – C.J. Johnson 12 yd pass from Matt Nagy (Calvin Russell pass from NAGY) – 51–43 PHI
- Officials: Referee: Bill LeMonnier; Umpire: Paul Frerking; Linesman: Greg Shields; Line judge: Dave Chesney; Back judge: Billy Beckett
- Offensive Player of the Game: Larry Brackins (PHI)
- Defensive Player of the Game: Gabe Nyenhuis (PHI)
- Ironman Player of the Game: Rob Keefe (PHI)

=== Week 13: vs. New York Dragons ===
Quarter	1	2	3	4	Total
NY	21	14	0	6	41
CLB	14	16	6	7	43

at Nationwide Arena, Columbus, Ohio

- Date: May 24
- Game time: 7:00 PM EST
- Game attendance: 12,842

Game information

1st Quarter:

- 13:10 NY – WILLIS, Jason 28 yd pass from GARCIA, Aaron (AZAR, Steve kick) – 7–0 NY
- 09:32 CLB – RUSSELL, Calvin 32 yd pass from NAGY, Matt (LEWIS, Mark kick) – 7–7
- 05:10 NY – ANTHONY, Chris 6 yd pass from GARCIA, Aaron (AZAR, Steve kick) – 14–7 NY
- 02:13 CLB – JOHNSON, C.J. 26 yd pass from NAGY, Matt (LEWIS, Mark kick) – 14–14
- 01:20 NY – SWAYNE, Kevin 20 yd pass from GARCIA, Aaron (AZAR, Steve kick) – 21–14 NY

2nd Quarter:

- 12:42 CLB – ILAOA, Nate 4 yd run (ZWICK, Justin rush failed) – 21–20 NY
- 09:03 NY – ANTHONY, Chris 4 yd pass from GARCIA, Aaron (AZAR, Steve kick) – 28–20 NY
- 01:53 CLB – JOHNSON, C.J. 5 yd pass from NAGY, Matt (LEWIS, Mark kick) – 28–27 NY
- 00:19 NY – WILLIS, Jason 9 yd pass from GARCIA, Aaron (AZAR, Steve kick) – 35–27 NY
- 00:00 CLB – LEWIS, Mark 32 yd field goal – 35–30 NY

3rd Quarter:

- 04:01 CLB – NAGY, Matt 2 yd run (LEWIS, Mark kick failed) – 36–35 CLB

4th Quarter:

- 12:18 CLB – RUSSELL, Calvin 40 yd pass from NAGY, Matt (LEWIS, Mark kick) – 43–35 CLB
- 00:35 NY – SWAYNE, Kevin 4 yd pass from GARCIA, Aaron (GARCIA, Aaron pass intcpt) – 43–41 CLB
- Officials: Referee: Dave Cutaia; Umpire: Rick Nelson; Linesman: Brent Durbin; Line judge: Darrel Leftwich; Back judge: Reggie Smith
- Offensive Player of the Game: CJ Johnson (CLB)
- Defensive Player of the Game: Matt Thomas (CLB)
- Ironman Player of the Game: N/A

=== Week 14: at New Orleans VooDoo ===
Quarter	1	2	3	4	Total
CLB	14	13	13	21	61
NO	14	20	28	21	83

at New Orleans Arena, New Orleans, Louisiana

- Date: May 30
- Game time: 8:30 PM EST
- Game attendance: 13,206

Game information

1st Quarter:

- 10:11 CLB – Lee, D. 6 yd pass from Nagy, M. (Lewis, M. kick) – 7–0 CLB
- 07:58 NO – Dudley, J. 15 yd pass from Wimprine, D. (Ruffin, J. kick) – 7–7
- 04:18 CLB – Russell, C. 5 yd run (Lewis, M. kick) – 14–7 CLB
- 00:05 NO – Jordan, J. 10 yd pass from Wimprine, D. (Ruffin, J. kick) – 14–14

2nd Quarter:

- 12:56 CLB – Russell, C. 11 yd pass from Nagy, M. (Lewis, M. kick failed) – 20–14 CLB
- 11:07 NO – Dudley, J. 8 yd pass from Wimprine, D. (Ruffin, J. kick) – 21–20 NO
- 04:29 NO – Ruffin, J. 45 yd field goal – 24–20 NO
- 00:47 CLB – Russell, C. 4 yd pass from Nagy, M. (Lewis, M. kick) – 27–24 CLB
- 00:11 NO – Ruffin, J. 31 yd field goal – 27–27
- 00:00 NO – Floyd, A. 27 yd interception return (Ruffin, J. kick) – 34–27 NO

3rd Quarter:

- 12:46 NO – Dudley, J. 9 yd pass from Wimprine, D. (Ruffin, J. kick) – 41–27
- 10:14 CLB – Lee, D. 44 yd pass from Nagy, M. (Lewis, M. kick) – 41–34 NO
- 09:04 NO – Jordan, J. 38 yd pass from Wimprine, D. (Ruffin, J. kick) – 48–34 NO
- 08:14 NO – Key, S. 3 yd net recovery (Ruffin, J. kick) – 55–34 NO
- 02:04 CLB – Wells, H. 1 yd run (Lewis, M. kick failed) – 55–40 NO
- 01:12 NO – Jordan, J. 6 yd pass from Wimprine, D. (Ruffin, J. kick) – 62–40 NO

4th Quarter:

- 09:38 CLB – Wells, H. 6 yd pass from Nagy, M. (Lewis, M. kick) – 62–47 NO
- 06:50 NO – Wimprine, D. 8 yd run (Ruffin, J. kick) – 69–47 NO
- 04:00 NO – Key, S. 6 yd pass from Wimprine, D. (Ruffin, J. kick) – 76–47 NO
- 00:59 CLB – Russell, C. 6 yd pass from Nagy, M. (Lewis, M. kick) – 76–54 NO
- 00:40 NO – Bellisari, S. 3 yd run (Ruffin, J. kick) – 83–54 NO
- 00:19 CLB – Johnson, C.J. 23 yd pass from Nagy, M. (Lewis, M. kick) – 83–61 NO
- Officials: Referee: Dave Cutaia; Umpire: Wes Fritz; Linesman: Neil Brunner; Line judge: Paul Engelberts; Back judge: Tony Lombardo
- Offensive Player of the Game: Danny Wimprine (NO)
- Defensive Player of the Game: Sale' Key (NO)
- Ironman Player of the Game: Anthony Floyd (NO)

=== Week 15: vs. Georgia Force ===
Quarter	1	2	3	4	Total
GA	14	21	14	14	63
CLB	7	13	7	7	34

at Nationwide Arena, Columbus, Ohio

- Date: June 7
- Game time: 7:00 PM EST
- Game attendance: 12,948

Game information

1st Quarter:

- 11:58 GA – BERGERON, Troy 14 yd pass from GREISEN, Chris (MARTINEZ, Carlo kick) – 7–0 GA
- 07:01 CLB – LEE, Derek 5 yd pass from NAGY, Matt (LEWIS, Mark kick) – 7–7
- 03:57 GA – JONES, Tiger 6 yd pass from GREISEN, Chris (MARTINEZ, Carlo kick) – 14–7 GA

2nd Quarter:

- 13:15 GA – BERGERON, Troy 34 yd pass from GREISEN, Chris (MARTINEZ, Carlo kick) – 21–7 GA
- 08:06 CLB – WELLS, Harold 3 yd run (LEWIS, Mark kick failed) – 21–13 GA
- 06:41 GA – BERGERON, Troy 49 yd pass from GREISEN, Chris (MARTINEZ, Carlo kick) – 28–13 GA
- 03:34 CLB – WELLS, Harold 1 yd run (LEWIS, Mark kick) – 28–20 GA
- 00:55 GA – MORRIS, Carl 7 yd pass from GREISEN, Chris (MARTINEZ, Carlo kick) – 35–20 GA

3rd Quarter:

- 11:25 CLB – THOMPSON, Leroy 3 yd pass from NAGY, Matt (LEWIS, Mark kick) – 35–27 GA
- 07:55 GA – JONES, Tiger 8 yd pass from GREISEN, Chris (MARTINEZ, Carlo kick) – 42–27 GA
- 05:03 GA – ALLEN, Ernest 0 yd fumble recovery (MARTINEZ, Carlo kick) – 49–27 GA

4th Quarter:

- 13:54 GA – BERGERON, Troy 24 yd pass from GREISEN, Chris (MARTINEZ, Carlo kick) – 56–27 GA
- 03:34 GA – MORRIS, Carl 1 yd run (MARTINEZ, Carlo kick) – 63–27 GA
- 01:27 CLB – JOHNSON, C.J. 32 yd pass from NAGY, Matt (LEWIS, Mark kick) – 63–34 GA
- Officials: Referee: Tom McCabe; Umpire: Rick Podraza; Linesman: Rod Pearson; Line judge: Dana McKenzie; Back judge: Scott Helverson
- Offensive Player of the Game: Troy Bergeron (GA)
- Defensive Player of the Game: JoJo Polk (GA)
- Ironman Player of the Game: Leroy Thompson (CLB)

=== Week 16: vs. Grand Rapids Rampage ===
Quarter	1	2	3	4	Total
GR	14	21	21	7	63
CLB	10	28	7	15	60

at Nationwide Arena, Columbus, Ohio

- Date: June 14
- Game time: 7:00 PM EST
- Game attendance: N/A

Game information

1st Quarter:

- 10:22 CLB – Mark Lewis 18 Yd field goal – 3–0 CLB
- 06:42 GR – Terrell Browden 5 Yd Run (Brian Gowins Kick) – 7–3 GR
- 04:24 CLB – Derek Lee 27 Yd Pass From Matt Nagy (Mark Lewis Kick) – 10–7 CLB
- 02:33 GR – Chris Johnson 22 Yd Pass From James Macpherson (Brian Gowins Kick) – 14–10 GR

2nd Quarter:

- 12:00 CLB – C.J. Johnson 15 Yd Pass From Matt Nagy (Mark Lewis Kick) – 17–14 CLB
- 11:14 GR – Chris Martin 57 Yd Kickoff Return (Brian Gowins Kick) – 21–17 GR
- 10:12 CLB – C.J. Johnson 47 Yd Pass From Justin Zwick (Mark Lewis Kick) – 24–21 CLB
- 06:53 GR – T.J. Watkins 4 Yd Run (Brian Gowins Kick) – 28–24 GR
- 04:53 CLB – Harold Wells 1 Yd Run (Mark Lewis Kick) – 31–28 CLB
- 03:10 GR – Kenny Higgins 36 Yd Pass From James Macpherson (Brian Gowins Kick) – 35–31 GR
- 00:40 CLB – C.J. Johnson 12 Yd Pass From Matt Nagy (Mark Lewis Kick) – 38–35 CLB

3rd Quarter:

- 14:41 GR – Chris Martin 57 Yd Kickoff Return (Brian Gowins Kick) 42–38 GR
- 12:48 CLB – Derek Lee 45 Yd Pass From Matt Nagy (Mark Lewis Kick) – 45–42 CLB
- 09:30 GR – Cole Magner 12 Yd Pass From James Macpherson (Brian Gowins Kick) – 49–45 GR
- 01:49 GR – Cole Magner 27 Yd Pass From James Macpherson (Brian Gowins Kick) – 56–45 GR

4th Quarter:

- 14:14 CLB – Calvin Russell 6 Yd Pass From Matt Nagy (Mark Lewis Kick) – 56–52 GR
- 06:53 GR – Chris Johnson 6 Yd Pass From James Macpherson (Brian Gowins Kick) – 63–52 GR
- 03:47 CLB – C.J. Johnson 22 Yd Pass From Matt Nagy (Rasheed Marshall Run) – 63–60 GR
- Officials: N/A
- Offensive Player of the Game: N/A
- Defensive Player of the Game: N/A
- Ironman Player of the Game: N/A

=== Week 17: at Cleveland Gladiators ===
Quarter	1	2	3	4	Total
CLB	7	14	7	7	35
CLE	7	21	3	16	47

at Quicken Loans Arena, Cleveland, Ohio

- Date: June 21
- Game time: 7:00 PM EST
- Game attendance: 14,397

Game information

1st Quarter:

- 12:52 CLB – WELLS 5 yd run (LEWIS kick) – 7–0 CLB
- 08:16 CLE – HYMES 13 yd pass from PHILYAW (BALL kick) – 7–7

2nd Quarter:

- 13:21 CLE – HYMES 43 yd pass from PHILYAW (BALL kick) – 14–7 CLE
- 10:30 CLB – JOHNSON 41 yd pass from NAGY (LEWIS kick) – 14–14
- 06:20 CLE – RILEY 6 yd pass from PHILYAW (BALL kick) – 21–14 CLE
- 00:49 CLB – NAGY 2 yd run (LEWIS kick) – 21–21
- 00:06 CLE – HYMES 16 yd pass from PHILYAW (BALL kick) – 28–21 CLE

3rd Quarter:

- 07:47 CLE – BALL 18 yd field goal – 31–21 CLE
- 04:05 CLB – WELLS 4 yd pass from NAGY (LEWIS kick) – 31–28 CLE

4th Quarter:

- 14:54 CLE – BALL 26 yd field goal – 34–28 CLE
- 08:07 CLE – AMEY 42 yd pass from PHILYAW (BALL kick failed) – 40–28 CLE
- 05:11 CLB – WELLS 6 yd pass from NAGY (LEWIS kick) – 40–35 CLE
- 02:55 CLE – AMEY 26 yd pass from PHILYAW (BALL kick) – 47–35 CLE
- Officials: Referee: Riley Johnson; Umpire: Rick Lowe; Linesman: Julian Mapp; Line judge: RG Detillier; Back judge: Bud McCleskey
- Offensive Player of the Game: Raymond Philyaw (CLE)
- Defensive Player of the Game: Sakeen Wright (CLE)
- Ironman Player of the Game: Karon Riley (CLE
