= 2008 Cleveland Gladiators season =

Arena Football League team season

- Head coach: Mike Wilpolt
- Home stadium: Quicken Loans Arena

Results
- Record: 9–7
- Division place: 3rd NC East
- Playoffs: Won Wild Card Playoffs (Predators) 69–66; Won Divisional Playoffs (Force) 73–70; Lost Conference Championship (Soul) 35–70

The 2008 Cleveland Gladiators season is the 12th season for the franchise, their first season in Cleveland. The Gladiators finished the regular season with a 9–7 record, and made the playoffs as the 4th seed in the National Conference. In the wild-card round of the playoffs, they defeated the Orlando Predators, 69–66. For their Divisional round game, they defeated the Georgia Force 73–70. In the National Conference Championship however, they were defeated 70–35 by the top-seeded Philadelphia Soul.

== Standings ==
Eastern Division
Team	W	L	PCT	PF	PA	DIV	CONF	Home	Away
Philadelphia Soul^{(1)}	13	3	.813	992	810	7–1	9–2	7–1	6–2
Dallas Desperados^{(3)}	12	4	.750	861	798	6–2	9–2	6–2	6–2
Cleveland Gladiators^{(4)}	9	7	.563	901	895	4–4	5–6	6–2	3–5
New York Dragons^{(6)}	8	8	.500	822	819	2–6	4–7	5–3	3–5
Columbus Destroyers	3	13	.188	750	893	1–7	2–10	2–6	1–7

== Regular season schedule ==
Week	Date	Opponent	Result	Record	Location	Attendance	Recap
1	March 3	New York Dragons	W 61–49	1–0	Quicken Loans Arena	17,391	Recap
2	March 9	Utah Blaze	W 66–63	2–0	Quicken Loans Arena	14,765	Recap
3	March 15	at Columbus Destroyers	W 59–57	3–0	Nationwide Arena	15,946	Recap
4	March 21	at New Orleans VooDoo	L 24–63	3–1	New Orleans Arena	13,027	Recap
5	Bye Week						
6	April 5	at Dallas Desperados	L 51–58	3–2	American Airlines Center	11,497	Recap
7	April 11	Colorado Crush	L 66–69	3–3	Quicken Loans Arena	15,079	Recap
8	April 19	at Los Angeles Avengers	W 83–69	4–3	Staples Center	13,863	Recap
9	April 26	at New York Dragons	L 39–56	4–4	Nassau Coliseum	9,991	Recap
10	May 2	Philadelphia Soul	W 67–55	5–4	Quicken Loans Arena	13,721	Recap
11	May 9	Orlando Predators	W 62–43	6–4	Quicken Loans Arena	13,808	Recap
12	May 17	at Colorado Crush	W 50–46	7–4	Pepsi Center	11,214	Recap
13	May 23	at Tampa Bay Storm	L 48–58	7–5	St. Pete Times Forum	15,976	Recap
14	May 31	Dallas Desperados	L 52–68	7–6	Quicken Loans Arena	11,717	Recap
15	June 7	Chicago Rush	W 65–44	8–6	Quicken Loans Arena	11,377	Recap
16	June 14	at Philadelphia Soul	L 61–62	8–7	Wachovia Center	16,637	Recap
17	June 21	Columbus Destroyers	W 47–35	9–7	Quicken Loans Arena	14,397	Recap

== Playoff schedule ==
Round	Date	Opponent (seed)	Result	Location	Attendance	Recap
NC Wild Card	June 30	Orlando Predators (5)	W 69–66	Quicken Loans Arena	13,896	Recap
NC Divisional	July 7	at Georgia Force (2)	W 73–70	The Arena at Gwinnett Center	10,173	Recap
NC Championship	July 12	at Philadelphia Soul (1)	L 35–70	Wachovia Center	13,389	Recap

== Coaching ==
- Mike Wilpolt – Head Coach
- Brian Partlow – Offensive Coordinator
- Willie Wood Jr. – WR, DB and Special Teams Coach
- Lee Johnson – Offensive/Defensive Line Coach
- John Tsironis – Strength & Conditioning Coach
- Matt Carlson – Video Coordinator

== Final roster ==
2008 Cleveland Gladiators roster
Quarterbacks: 6 Rohan Davey; 9 Raymond Philyaw; Fullbacks: 32 Marlion Jackson; 42 Joshua Rue; Wide receivers: 10 Otis Amey; 12 Randy Hymes; 5 Ron Johnson; -- Willis Marshall; 2 Robert Redd	Offensive linemen: 54 Kimani Jones; 65 Tango McCauley; 72 Antonio Narcisse; Defensive linemen: 90 Silas DeMary; 98 Joe Minucci; 55 Elex Reed; 91 Karon Riley; 97 Bryant Shaw	Linebackers: 24 Brandon Hefflin; Defensive backs: 23 Alphonso Hodge; 18 Kendrick Mosley; 3 Alex Teems; 17 Sakeen Wright; Kickers: 11 Jason Ball	Injury reserve: -- Aaron Gibson OL (IR); 75 Craig Heimburger OL (IR); Refused to report: currently vacant; Other league exempt: currently vacant; Suspension: currently vacant; Practice squad: currently vacant; rookies in italics Roster updated June 21, 2008; 23 Active, 2 Inactive, 0 PS → More rosters

== Regular season ==
=== Week 1: vs. New York Dragons ===
Quarter	1	2	3	4	Total
NYD	0	21	14	14	49
CLE	14	16	10	21	61

at Quicken Loans Arena, Cleveland, Ohio

- Date: March 3
- Game time: 7:00 PM EST
- Game attendance: 17,391

Game information

1st Quarter:

- 14:35 CLE – McCULLOUGH 37 yd pass from PHILYAW (BALL kick) – 7–0 CLE
- 3:25 CLE – Redd 22 yd pass from PHILYAW (BALL kick) – 14–0 CLE

2nd Quarter:

- 12:19 NY – SWAYNE 5 yd pass from DAVEY (ONORATO kick) – 14–7 CLE
- 10:50 CLE – AMEY 13 yd pass from PHILYAW (BALL kick failed) – 20–7 CLE
- 6:57 NY – PRICE 1 yd run (ONORATO kick) – 20–14 CLE
- 1:24 CLE – AMEY 3 yd pass from PHILYAW (BALL kick) – 27–14 CLE
- 0:31 NY – SWAYNE 16 yd pass from DAVEY (ONORATO kick) – 27–21 CLE
- 0:00 CLE – BALL 28 yd field goal – 30–21 CLE

3rd Quarter:

- 11:40 NY – SWAYNE 4 yd pass from DAVEY (ONORATO kick) – 30–28 CLE
- 4:38 CLE – BALL 32 yd field goal – 33–28 CLE
- 2:15 NY – ANTHONY 10 yd pass from DAVEY (ONORATO kick) – 35–33 NY
- 1:00 CLE – JACKSON 32 yd run (BALL kick) – 40–35 CLE

4th Quarter:

- 13:54 CLE – AMEY 4 yd run (BALL kick) – 47–35 CLE
- 8:55 NYD – ANTHONY 4 yd pass from DAVEY (ONORATO kick) – 47–42 CLE
- 6:45 CLE – JACKSON 6 yd pass from PHILYAW (BALL kick) – 54–42 CLE
- 0:06 CLE – Redd 50 yd interception return (BALL kick) – 61–42 CLE
- 0:00 NYD – GROCE 56 yd kickoff return (ONORATO kick) – 61–49 CLE
- Officials: Dennis Lipski; Rick Nelson; Brent Durbin; Darrel Leftwich; Reggie Smith; Jason Tirotta;
- Offensive Player of the Game: Raymond Philyaw (CLE)
- Defensive Player of the Game: Brandon Hefflin (CLE)
- Ironman of the Game: Marlion Jackson (CLE)

=== Week 2: vs. Utah Blaze ===
Quarter	1	2	3	4	Total
UTA	14	15	7	27	63
CLE	9	23	13	21	66

at Quicken Loans Arena, Cleveland, Ohio

- Date: March 9
- Game time: 12:30 PM EDT
- Game attendance: 14,765

Game information

1st Quarter:

- 12:41 UTA – Aaron Boone 14 yd pass from Joe Germaine (Steve Azar kick) – 7–0 UTA
- 7:51 CLE – Jason Ball 21 yd field goal – 7–3 UTA
- 4:53 CLE – Robert Redd 19 yd pass from Raymond Philyaw (Jason Ball kick failed) – 9–7 CLE
- 2:26 UTA – Huey Whittaker 25 yd pass from Joe Germaine (Steve Azar kick) – 14–9 UTA

2nd Quarter:

- 13:24 CLE – Cornelius Bonner 5 yd pass from Raymond Philyaw (Jason Ball kick) – 16–14 CLE
- 10:46 UTA – Aaron Boone 26 yd pass from Joe Germaine (Steve Azar kick) – 21–16 UTA
- 5:10 CLE – Ramon Richardson 1 yd run (Jason Ball kick) – 23–21 CLE
- 4:09 CLE – Sakeen Wright 7 yd interception return (Jason Ball kick blockd) – 29–21 CLE
- 0:09 UTA – Joe Germaine 2 yd run (Huey Whittaker rush) – 29–29
- 0:00 CLE – Jason Ball 46 yd field goal – 32–29 CLE

3rd Quarter:

- 11:30 CLE – Robert Redd 12 yd pass from Raymond Philyaw (Jason Ball kick) – 39–29 CLE
- 9:20 UTA – JJ McKelvey 8 yd pass from Joe Germaine (Steve Azar kick) – 39–36 CLE
- 6:26 CLE – Otis Amey 10 yd pass from Raymond Philyaw (Jason Ball kick blocked) – 45–36 CLE

4th Quarter:

- 14:55 CLE – Otis Amey 6 yd pass from Raymond Philyaw (Jason Ball kick) – 52–36 CLE
- 12:09 UTA – JJ McKelvey 15 yd pass from Joe Germaine (Steve Azar kick) – 52–43 CLE
- 9:34 CLE – Robert Redd 34 yd pass from Raymond Philyaw (Jason Ball kick) – 59–43 CLE
- 7:50 UTA – Huey Whittaker 16 yd pass from Joe Germaine (Joe Germaine pass failed) – 59–49 CLE
- 4:19 UTA – JJ McKelvey 5 yd pass from Joe Germaine (Steve Azar kick) 59–56 CLE
- 1:30 CLE – Marlion Jackson 1 yd run (Jason Ball kick) – 66–56 CLE
- 0:30 UTA – Huey Whittaker 8 yd pass from Joe Germaine (Steve Azar kick) 66–63 CLE
- Officials: Referee: Dave Lambros; Umpire: Wes Fritz; Linesman: Neil Brunner; Line judge: Paul Engleberts; Back judge: Tony Lombardo
- Offensive Player of the Game: Raymond Philyaw (CLE)
- Defensive Player of the Game: Sakeem Wright (CLE)
- Ironman of the Game: Robert Redd (CLE)

=== Week 3: at Columbus Destroyers ===
Quarter	1	2	3	4	Total
CLE	14	9	19	17	59
CLB	10	21	7	19	57

at Nationwide Arena, Columbus, Ohio

- Date: March 15
- Game time: 7:00 PM EST
- Game attendance: TBD

Game information

1st Quarter:

- 8:45 CLB – LEWIS, Mark 27 yd field goal – 3–0 CLB
- 5:07 CLE – JACKSON, Marlion 10 yd run (BALL, Jason kick) – 7–3 CLE
- 2:24 CLB – LEE, Derek 6 yd pass from NAGY, Matt (LEWIS, Mark kick) – 10–7 CLB
- 0:11 CLE – PHILYAW, Raymond 7 yd run (BALL, Jason kick) – 14–10 CLE

2nd Quarter:

- 12:20 CLB – LEE, Derek 2 yd pass from NAGY, Matt (LEWIS, Mark kick) – 17–14 CLB
- 7:41 CLE – BALL, Jason 26 yd field goal – 17–17
- 4:55 CLB – WELLS, Harold 8 yd run (LEWIS, Mark kick) – 24–17 CLB
- 2:16 CLE – AMEY, Otis 20 yd pass from PHILYAW, Raymond (BALL, Jason kick failed) – 24–23 CLB
- 0:05 CLB – WELLS, Harold 3 yd pass from NAGY, Matt (LEWIS, Mark kick) – 31–23 CLE

3rd Quarter:

- 12:47 CLE – AMEY, Otis 24 yd pass from PHILYAW, Raymond (BALL, Jason kick failed) – 31–29 CLB
- 8:46 CLE – JACKSON, Marlion 20 yd run (BALL, Jason kick failed) – 35–31 CLE
- 3:49 CLB – MARSHALL, Rasheed 4 yd pass from NAGY, Matt (LEWIS, Mark kick) – 38–35 CLB
- 1:14 CLE – AMEY, Otis 6 yd pass from PHILYAW, Raymond (BALL, Jason kick) – 42–38 CLE

4th Quarter:

- 14:38 CLB – WELLS, Harold 20 yd pass from NAGY, Matt (LEWIS, Mark kick failed) – 44–42 CLB
- 12:45 CLE – REDD, Robert 8 yd pass from PHILYAW, Raymond (BALL, Jason kick) – 49–44 CLE
- 10:12 CLB – MARSHALL, Rasheed 34 yd pass from NAGY, Matt (LEWIS, Mark kick) – 51–49 CLB
- 6:54 CLE – BALL, Jason 19 yd field goal – 52–51 CLE
- 0:43 CLE – REDD, Robert 17 yd pass from PHILYAW, Raymond (BALL, Jason kick) – 59–51 CLE
- 0:22 CLB – LEE, Derek 33 yd pass from NAGY, Matt (NAGY, Matt pass failed) – 59–57 CLE
- Officials: Referee: Bill LeMonnier; Umpire: Jeff Carr; Linesman: Greg Shields; Line judge: Dave Chesney; Back judge: Billy Beckett
- Offensive Player of the Game: Otis Amey (CLE)
- Defensive Player of the Game: Robert Freeman (CLB)
- Ironman Player of the Game: N/A

=== Week 4: at New Orleans VooDoo ===
Quarter	1	2	3	4	Total
CLE	0	10	0	14	24
NO	21	14	7	21	63

at New Orleans Arena, New Orleans, Louisiana

- Date: March 21
- Game time: 8:30 PM EST
- Game attendance: 13,027

Game information

1st Quarter:

- 12:14 NO – Jordan, J. 16 yd pass from Wimprine, D. (Ruffin, J. kick) – 7–0 NO
- 7:39 NO – Dudley, J. 20 yd pass from Wimprine, D. (Ruffin, J. kick) – 14–0 NO
- 3:09 NO – Jones, T. 36 yd pass from Wimprine, D. (Ruffin, J. kick) – 21–0 NO

2nd Quarter:

- 13:49 CLE – Philyaw, R. 7 yd run (Ball, J. kick) – 21–7 NO
- 2:18 CLE – Ball, J. 30 yd field goal – 21–10 NO
- 0:29 NO – Lynch, J. 2 yd run (Ruffin, J. kick) – 28–10 NO
- 0:00 NO – Williams, W. 53 yd net recovery (Ruffin, J. kick) – 35–10 NO

3rd Quarter:

- 11:05 NO – Jones, T. 18 yd pass from Wimprine, D. (Ruffin, J. kick) – 42–10 NO

4th Quarter:

- 12:25 NO – Lynch, J. 1 yd run (Ruffin, J. kick) – 49–10 NO
- 10:26 CLE – Bonner, C. 31 yd pass from Davis, J. (Ball, J. kick) – 49–17 NO
- 9:16 NO – Jordan, J. 14 yd pass from Bellisari, S. (Ruffin, J. kick) – 56–17 NO
- 8:16 NO – Williams, W. 3 yd net recovery (Ruffin, J. kick) – 63–17 NO
- 4:51 CLE – Bonner, C. 46 yd pass from Davis, J. (Ball, J. kick) – 63–24 NO
- Officials: Referee: Pat Garvey; Umpire: Paul King; Linesman: Bill Ward; Line judge: Dana McKinzie; Back judge: James DeBell
- Offensive Player of the Game: James Jordan (NO)
- Defensive Player of the Game: Calvin Spears (NO)
- Ironman Player of the Game: Wendall Williams (NO)

=== Week 6: at Dallas Desperados ===
Quarter	1	2	3	4	Total
CLE	7	17	10	17	51
DAL	7	21	20	10	58

at American Airlines Center, Dallas, Texas

- Date: April 5
- Game time: 7:00 PM EST
- Game attendance: 11,497

Game information

1st Quarter:

- 9:42 DAL – PERRY, Bobby 33 yd interception return (HAMILTON, Remy kick) – 7–0 DAL
- 2:51 CLE – JACKSON, Marlion 1 yd run (BALL, Jason kick) – 7–7

2nd Quarter:

- 11:16 DAL – DOLEZEL, Clint 2 yd run (HAMILTON, Remy kick) – 14–7 DAL
- 9:20 CLE – AMEY, Otis 25 yd pass from PHILYAW, Raymon (BALL, Jason kick) – 14–14
- 6:36 DAL – NASH, Marcus 43 yd pass from DOLEZEL, Clint (HAMILTON, Remy kick) – 21–14 DAL
- 0:47 CLE – REDD, Robert 5 yd pass from PHILYAW, Raymon (BALL, Jason kick) – 21–21
- 0:28 DAL – NASH, Marcus 10 yd pass from DOLEZEL, Clint (HAMILTON, Remy kick) – 28–21 DAL
- 0:00 CLE – BALL, Jason 28 yd field goal – 28–24 DAL

3rd Quarter:

- 9:43 CLE – BALL, Jason 22 yd field goal 28–27 DAL
- 7:56 DAL – NASH, Marcus 4 yd pass from DOLEZEL, Clint (HAMILTON, Remy kick) – 35–27 DAL
- 7:07 DAL – DIXON, David 0 yd net recovery (HAMILTON, Remy kick failed) – 41–27 DAL
- 3:21 CLE – AMEY, Otis 11 yd pass from PHILYAW, Raymon (BALL, Jason kick) – 41–34 DAL
- 0:12 DAL – NASH, Marcus 23 yd pass from DOLEZEL, Clint (HAMILTON, Remy kick) – 48–34 DAL

4th Quarter:

- 11:33 CLE – MINUCCI, Joe 2 yd pass from PHILYAW, Raymon (BALL, Jason kick) – 48–41 DAL
- 6:10 DAL – NASH, Marcus 4 yd pass from DOLEZEL, Clint (HAMILTON, Remy kick) – 55–41 DAL
- 3:09 CLE – RICHARDSON, Ram 3 yd pass from PHILYAW, Raymon (BALL, Jason kick) – 55–48 DAL
- 0:22 DAL – HAMILTON, Remy 20 yd field goal – 58–48 DAL
- 0:03 CLE – BALL, Jason 26 yd field goal – 58–51 DAL
- Officials: Referee: Dave Cutaia; Umpire: Al Granado; Linesman: Mike McCabe; Line judge: Art Lucky; Back judge: James Cole
- Offensive Player of the Game: Clint Dolezel (DAL)
- Defensive Player of the Game: Bobby Perry (DAL)
- Ironman Player of the Game: Will Pettis (DAL)

=== Week 7: vs. Colorado Crush ===
Quarter	1	2	3	4	Total
COL	7	24	21	17	69
CLE	17	21	14	14	66

at Quicken Loans Arena, Cleveland, Ohio

- Date: April 11
- Game time: 7:00 PM EST
- Game attendance: 15,079

Game information

1st Quarter:

- 12:56 CLE – AMEY 13 yd pass from PHILYAW (BALL kick) – 7–0 CLE
- 7:20 CLE – AMEY 13 yd pass from PHILYAW (BALL kick) – 14–0 CLE
- 5:03 COL – QUINNIE 23 yd pass from DUTTON (RUSH kick) – 14–7 CLE
- 2:11 CLE – BALL 18 yd field goal – 17–7 CLE

2nd Quarter:

- 14:55 COL – NELSON 16 yd pass from DUTTON (RUSH kick) – 17–14 CLE
- 11:13 CLE – JACKSON 3 yd run (BALL kick) – 24–14 CLE
- 8:08 COL – PYATT 6 yd pass from DUTTON (RUSH kick) – 24–21 CLE
- 1:16 CLE – AMEY 6 yd pass from PHILYAW (BALL kick) – 31–21 CLE
- 0:51 COL – QUINNIE 7 yd pass from DUTTON (RUSH kick) – 31–28 CLE
- 0:37 CLE – AMEY 8 yd pass from PHILYAW (BALL kick) – 38–28 CLE
- 0:00 COL – RUSH 21 yd field goal – 38–31 CLE

3rd Quarter:

- 13:06 COL – DUTTON 4 yd run (RUSH kick) – 38–38
- 10:29 CLE – JACKSON 2 yd run (BALL kick) – 45–38 CLE
- 8:01 COL – QUINNIE 10 yd pass from DUTTON (RUSH kick) – 45–45
- 5:19 CLE – AMEY 9 yd pass from PHILYAW (BALL kick) – 52–45 CLE
- 2:50 COL – NELSON 8 yd pass from DUTTON (RUSH kick) – 52–52

4th Quarter:

- 8:59 COL – PYATT 10 yd pass from DUTTON (RUSH kick) – 59–52 COL
- 2:01 COL – RUSH 34 yd field goal – 62–52 COL
- 1:01 CLE – REDD 11 yd pass from PHILYAW (BALL kick) – 62–59 COL
- 0:44 COL – QUINNIE 5 yd pass from DUTTON (RUSH kick) – 69–59 COL
- 0:27 CLE – AMEY 3 yd pass from PHILYAW (BALL kick) – 69–66 COL
- Officials: Referee: Dave Lambros; Umpire: Doug Wilson; Linesman: Kelly Sallfeld; Line judge: Brian Matthew; Back judge: Rich Wilborn
- Offensive Player of the Game: Otis Amey (CLE)
- Defensive Player of the Game: Rashad Floyd (COL)
- Ironman Player of the Game: N/A

=== Week 8: at Los Angeles Avengers ===
Quarter	1	2	3	4	Total
CLE	27	14	14	28	83
LA	13	21	14	21	69

at Staples Center, Los Angeles, California

- Date: April 19
- Game time: 10:30 PM EST
- Game attendance: 13,863

Game information

1st Quarter:

- 13:55 CLE – Jackson 26 yd pass from Philyaw (Ball Kick) – 7–0 CLE
- 11:07 LA – Perkins 2 yd pass from Hicks (Pat Failed) – 7–6 LA
- 9:13 CLE – Jackson 39 yd pass from Philyaw (Pat Failed) – 13–6 LA
- 8:01 LA – Marshall 37 yd pass from Hicks (Davis Kick) – 13–13
- 4:15 CLE – Jackson 1 yd run (Ball Kick) – 20–13 CLE
- 3:31 CLE – Amey 9 yd pass from Philyaw (Ball Kick) – 27–13 CLE

2nd Quarter:

- 9:12 LA- Tolver 19 yd pass from Hicks (Davis Kick) – 27–20 LA
- 2:59 LA – Hicks 7 yd run (Davis Kick) – 27–27
- 1:20 CLE – Amey 13 yd pass from Philyaw (Ball Kick) – 34–27 CLE
- 0:41 LA – Ward 5 yd pass from Hicks (Davis Kick) – 34–34 LA
- 0:12 CLE – Amey 4 yd pass from Philyaw (Ball Kick) – 41–34 CLE

3rd Quarter:

- 11:14 LA – Tolver 6 yd pass from Hicks (Davis Kick)- 41–41
- 9:13 CLE – Jackson 1 yd run (Ball Kick) – 48–41 CLE
- 8:11 CLE – Jackson 1 yd run (Ball Kick) – 55–41 CLE
- 3:19 LA – Tolver 10 yd pass from Hicks (Davis Kick) – 55–48 CLE

4th Quarter:

- 10:53 LA – Harrell 6 yd pass from Hicks (Davis Kick) – 55–55
- 8:37 CLE – Amey 30 yd pass from Philyaw (Ball Kick) – 62–55 CLE
- 7:31 LA – Ward 20 yd pass from Hicks (Davis Kick) – 62–62 LA
- 5:15 CLE – Marshall 22 yd pass from Hicks (Ball Kick) – 69–62 CLE
- 1:54 CLE – Amey 9 yd pass from Philyaw (Ball Kick) – 76–62 CLE
- 0:37 LA – Tolver 4 yd pass from Hicks (Ball Kick) – 76–69 LA
- 0:19 CLE – Amey 8 yd pass from Philyaw (Ball Kick) – 83–69 CLE
- Officials: Referee: Bill McCabe; Umpire: Wes Fritz; Linesman: Neil Brunner; Line judge: Paul Engleberts; Back judge: Tony Lombardo
- Offensive Player of the Game: Otis Amey (CLE)
- Defensive Player of the Game: Brandon Hefflin (CLE)
- Ironman Player of the Game: N/A

=== Week 9: at New York Dragons ===
Quarter	1	2	3	4	Total
CLE	13	7	13	6	39
NY	14	21	14	7	56

at Nassau Veterans Memorial Coliseum, Uniondale, New York

- Date: April 26
- Game time: 7:00 PM EST
- Game attendance: 9,991

Game information

1st Quarter:

- 11:13 CLE – Otis Amey 7 yd pass from Raymond Philyaw (Jason Ball kick) – 7–0 CLE
- 8:24 NY – Kevin Swayne 9 yd pass from Aaron Garcia (Chris Onorato kick) – 7–7
- 3:58 CLE – Marlion Jackson 1 yd run (Jason Ball kick failed) – 13–7 CLE
- 1:03 NY – Ricky Hall 1 yd run (Chris Onorato kick) – 14–13 NY

2nd Quarter:

- 12:35 NY – Terry Moss 12 yd pass from Aaron Garcia (Chris Onorato kick) – 21–13 NY
- 2:17 NY – Jason Willis 4 yd pass from Aaron Garcia (Chris Onorato kick) – 28–13 NY
- 0:54 CLE – Robert Redd 35 yd pass from Raymond Philyaw (Jason Ball kick) – 28–20 NY
- 0:30 NY – Kevin Swayne 6 yd pass from Aaron Garcia (Chris Onorato kick) – 35–20 NY

3rd Quarter:

- 11:27 NY – Kevin Swayne 4 yd pass from Aaron Garcia (Chris Onorato kick) – 42–20 NY
- 9:40 CLE – Marlion Jackson 14 yd run (Raymond Philyaw pass failed) – 42–26 NY
- 3:27 CLE – Robert Redd 29 yd pass from Raymond Philyaw (Jason Ball kick) – 42–33 NY
- 0:55 NY – Kevin Swayne 30 yd pass from Aaron Garcia (Chris Onorato kick) – 49–33 NY

4th Quarter:

- 10:14 CLE – Kimani Jones 4 yd pass from Raymond Philyaw (Raymond Philyaw pass intcpt) – 49–39 NY
- 0:23 NY – Jason Willis 31 yd pass from Aaron Garcia (Chris Onorato kick) – 56–39 NY
- Officials: Referee: Dennis Lipski; Umpire: Rick Nelson; Linesman: Brent Durbin; Line judge: Darrel Leftwich; Back judge: Reggie Smith
- Offensive Player of the Game: Kevin Swayne (NY)
- Defensive Player of the Game: Idris Price (NY)
- Ironman Player of the Game: Ricky Hall (NY)

=== Week 10: vs. Philadelphia Soul ===
Quarter	1	2	3	4	Total
PHI	20	14	14	7	55
CLE	14	13	20	20	67

at Quicken Loans Arena, Cleveland, Ohio

- Date: May 2
- Game time: 7:00 PM EST
- Game attendance: 13,721

Game information

1st Quarter:

- 12:24 PHI – BRACKINS 18 yd pass from D'ORAZIO (HUGHES kick failed) – 6–0 PHI
- 10:53 PHI – WEBB 0 yd net recovery (HUGHES kick) – 13–0 PHI
- 8:07 CLE – JACKSON 2 yd run (BALL kick) – 13–7 PHI
- 4:21 PHI – BRACKINS 6 yd pass from D'ORAZIO (HUGHES kick) – 20–7 PHI
- 2:01 CLE – AMEY 12 yd pass from PHILYAW (BALL kick) – 20–14 PHI

2nd Quarter:

- 12:49 PHI – JACKSON 3 yd pass from D'ORAZIO (HUGHES kick) – 27–14 PHI
- 8:22 CLE – AMEY 21 yd pass from PHILYAW (BALL kick failed) – 27–20 PHI
- 0:36 PHI – D'ORAZIO 4 yd run (HUGHES kick) – 34–20 PHI
- 0:17 CLE – AMEY 16 yd pass from PHILYAW (BALL kick) – 34–27 PHI

3rd Quarter:

- 13:56 CLE – JACKSON 5 yd run (BALL kick) – 34–34
- 12:29 CLE – REDD 0 yd net recovery (BALL kick) – 41–34 CLE
- 9:47 PHI – WATTS 20 yd pass from GRAZIANI (HUGHES kick) – 41–41
- 5:06 CLE – JACKSON 3 yd run (BALL kick blocked) – 47–41 CLE
- 0:09 PHI – JACKSON 8 yd pass from GRAZIANI (HUGHES kick) – 48–47 PHI

4th Quarter:

- 11:24 CLE – JACKSON 4 yd run (AMEY rush) – 55–48 CLE
- 6:57 PHI – JACKSON 7 yd pass from GRAZIANI (HUGHES kick) – 55–55
- 4:04 CLE – MINUCCI 5 yd pass from PHILYAW – 61–55 CLE
- 0:42 CLE – AMEY 23 yd pass from PHILYAW (PHILYAW pass failed) – 67–55 CLE
- Officials: Referee: Bill McCabe; Umpire: Mike Delaney; Linesman: Shawn Hochuli; Line judge: Dirk Bell; Back judge: Jimmy Buchanan
- Offensive Player of the Game: Marlion Jackson (CLE)
- Defensive Player of the Game: Sakeen Wright (CLE)
- Ironman Player of the Game: Willis Marshall (CLE)

=== Week 11: vs. Orlando Predators ===
Quarter	1	2	3	4	Total
ORL	13	9	7	14	43
CLE	7	20	21	14	62

at Quicken Loans Arena, Cleveland, Ohio

- Date: May 9
- Game time: 7:00 PM EST
- Game attendance: 13,808

Game information

1st Quarter:

- 11:32 ORL – HILL 4 yd pass from STAFFORD (FRANCE kick failed) – 6–0 ORL
- 5:11 CLE – PHILYAW 6 yd pass from REDD (BALL kick) – 7–6 CLE
- 1:43 ORL – TOLIVER 31 yd pass from STAFFORD (FRANCE kick) – 13–7 ORL

2nd Quarter:

- 13:07 CLE – REDD 9 yd pass from PHILYAW (BALL kick) – 14–13 CLE
- 6:58 CLE – AMEY 3 yd pass from PHILYAW (BALL kick failed) – 20–13 CLE
- 4:06 ORL – JOHNSON 8 yd pass from STAFFORD (FRANCE kick failed) – 20–19 CLE
- 0:19 CLE – REDD 19 yd pass from PHILYAW (BALL kick) – 27–19 CLE
- 0:00 ORL – FRANCE 43 yd field goal – 27–22 CLE

3rd Quarter:

- 12:45 CLE – AMEY 14 yd pass from PHILYAW (BALL kick) – 34–22 CLE
- 12:01 ORL – JOHNSON 30 yd pass from STAFFORD (FRANCE kick) – 34–29 CLE
- 10:48 CLE – WRIGHT 27 yd pass from PHILYAW (BALL kick) – 41–29 CLE
- 2:01 CLE – REDD 27 yd pass from PHILYAW (BALL kick) – 48–29 CLE

4th Quarter:

- 14:22 ORL – GESSNER 3 yd pass from STAFFORD (GESSNER pass from STAFFORD) – 48–37 CLE
- 9:36 CLE – AMEY 11 yd pass from PHILYAW (BALL kick) – 55–37 CLE
- 7:25 ORL – JOHNSON 7 yd pass from STAFFORD (STAFFORD pass failed) – 55–43 CLE
- 5:54 CLE – MARSHALL 7 yd run (BALL kick) – 62–43 CLE
- Officials: Referee: Dave Cutaia; Umpire: Paul Frerking; Linesman: Mike McCabe; Line judge: Art Lucky; Back judge: James Cole
- Offensive Player of the Game: Robert Redd (CLE)
- Defensive Player of the Game: Joe Minucci (CLE)
- Ironman Player of the Game: Sakeen Wright (CLE)

=== Week 12: at Colorado Crush ===
Quarter	1	2	3	4	Total
CLE	7	20	7	16	50
COL	7	17	7	15	46

at Pepsi Center, Denver, Colorado

- Date: May 17
- Game time: 8:00 PM EST
- Game attendance: 11,214

Game information

1st Quarter:

- 8:09 COL – Chad Owens 1 yd run (Deric Yaussi kick) – 7–0 COL
- 4:37 CLE – Otis Amey 5 yd pass from Raymond Philyaw (Jason Ball kick) – 7–7

2nd Quarter:

- 13:08 COL – Deric Yaussi 25 yd field goal – 10–7 COL
- 11:12 CLE – Otis Amey 34 yd pass from Raymond Philyaw (Jason Ball kick) – 14–10 CLE
- 9:09 COL – Ben Nelson 6 yd pass from John Dutton (Deric Yaussi kick) – 17–14 COL
- 3:10 CLE – Robert Redd 11 yd pass from Raymond Philyaw (Jason Ball kick failed) – 20–17 CLE
- 0:40 COL – Ben Nelson 11 yd pass from John Dutton (Deric Yaussi kick) – 24–20 COL
- 0:04 CLE – Marlion Jackson 1 yd run (Jason Ball kick) – 27–24 CLE

3rd Quarter:

- 10:19 CLE – Otis Amey 17 yd pass from Raymond Philyaw (Jason Ball kick) – 34–24 CLE
- 7:21 COL – Aaron Hosack 12 yd pass from John Dutton (Deric Yaussi kick) – 34–31 CLE

4th Quarter:

- 10:00 CLE – Jason Ball 22 yd field goal – 37–31 CLE
- 8:26 COL – Ben Nelson 6 yd pass from John Dutton (Deric Yaussi kick) – 38–37 COL
- 4:06 CLE – Willis Marshall 8 yd pass from Raymond Philyaw (Raymond Philyaw pass failed) – 43–38 CLE
- 0:28 CLE – Otis Amey 23 yd pass from Raymond Philyaw (Jason Ball kick) – 50–38 CLE
- 0:00 COL – Willie Quinnie 7 yd pass from John Dutton (Aaron Hosack pass from DUTTON) – 50–46 CLE
- Officials: Referee: Bill Athan; Umpire: Matt Jordan; Linesman: Allen Baynes; Line judge: Rusty Baynes; Back judge: Greg Wilson
- Offensive Player of the Game: N/A
- Defensive Player of the Game: N/A
- Ironman Player of the Game: N/A

=== Week 13: at Tampa Bay Storm ===
Quarter	1	2	3	4	Total
CLE	19	7	7	15	48
TB	14	14	6	24	58

at St. Pete Times Forum, Tampa, Florida

- Date: May 23
- Game time: 7:30 PM EST
- Game attendance: 15,976

Game information

1st Quarter:

- 13:11 TB – SHAW, Terrill 9 yd pass from DIETZ, Brett (MARLER, Seth kick) – 7–0 TB
- 9:25 CLE – AMEY, Otis 8 yd pass from PHILYAW, Raymon (BALL, Jason kick failed) – 7–6 TB
- 6:48 TB – SHAW, Terrill 29 yd pass from DIETZ, Brett (MARLER, Seth kick) – 14–6 TB
- 3:05 CLE – MARSHALL, Willi 8 yd run (BALL, Jason kick) – 14–13 TB
- 2:10 CLE – REDD, Robert 2 yd net recovery (BALL, Jason kick blocked) – 19–14 CLE

2nd Quarter:

- 9:21 CLE – JACKSON, Marlio 3 yd run (BALL, Jason kick) – 26–14 CLE
- 3:35 TB – TIMMONS, Tyrone 4 yd pass from DIETZ, Brett (MARLER, Seth kick) – 26–21 CLE
- 0:21 TB – TIMMONS, Tyrone 9 yd pass from DIETZ, Brett (MARLER, Seth kick) – 28–26 CLE

3rd Quarter:

- 10:57 CLE – JACKSON, Marlio 1 yd run (BALL, Jason kick) – 33–28 CLE
- 2:51 TB – MARSHALL, Torra 2 yd run (CASE, Stoney rush failed) – 34–33 TB

4th Quarter:

- 13:45 TB – SHAW, Terrill 15 yd pass from DIETZ, Brett (MARLER, Seth kick) – 41–33 TB
- 11:51 CLE – AMEY, Otis 14 yd pass from PHILYAW, Raymon (MARSHALL, Willi pass from PHILYAW, Raymon) – 41–41
- 6:43 TB – MARSHALL, Torra 2 yd run (MARLER, Seth kick) – 48–41 TB
- 4:21 TB – TIMMONS, Tyrone 8 yd pass from DIETZ, Brett (MARLER, Seth kick) – 55–41 TB
- 1:23 CLE – MARSHALL, Willi 8 yd pass from PHILYAW, Raymon (BALL, Jason kick) – 55–48 TB
- 0:13 TB – MARLER, Seth 23 yd field goal – 58–48 TB
- Officials: Referee: Riley Johnson; Umpire: Rick Lowe; Linesman: Julian Mapp; Line judge: RG Detillier; Back judge: Bud McClesky
- Offensive Player of the Game: Tyrone Timmons (TB)
- Defensive Player of the Game: Tim McGill (TB)
- Ironman Player of the Game: Lawrence Samuels (TB)

=== Week 14: vs. Dallas Desperados ===
Quarter	1	2	3	4	Total
DAL	7	27	14	20	68
CLE	10	21	14	7	52

at Quicken Loans Arena, Cleveland, Ohio

- Date: May 31
- Game time: 8:00 PM EST
- Game attendance: 11,717

Game information

1st Quarter:

- 9:43 CLE – Jason Ball 41 yd field goal – 3–0 CLE
- 4:20 DAL – Anthony Armstrong 3 yd pass from Will Pettis (Remy Hamilton kick) – 7–3 DAL
- 0:43 CLE – Marlion Jackson 4 yd run (Jason Ball kick) – 10–7 CLE

2nd Quarter:

- 13:52 DAL – Will Pettis 21 yd pass from Clint Dolezel (Remy Hamilton kick failed) – 13–10 DAL
- 10:48 DAL – Marcus Nash 10 yd pass from Clint Dolezel (Remy Hamilton kick) – 20–10 DAL
- 5:48 CLE – Marlion Jackson 2 yd run (Jason Ball kick) – 20–17 DAL
- 3:19 DAL – Anthony Armstrong 2 yd pass from Clint Dolezel (Remy Hamilton kick) – 27–17 DAL
- 1:49 CLE – Marlion Jackson 1 yd run (Jason Ball kick) – 27–24 DAL
- 0:56 DAL – Will Pettis 5 yd pass from Clint Dolezel (Remy Hamilton kick) – 34–24 DAL
- 0:09 CLE – Otis Amey 12 yd pass from Raymond Philyaw (Jason Ball kick) – 34–21 DAL

3rd Quarter:

- 11:59 DAL – Anthony Armstrong 13 yd pass from Clint Dolezel (Remy Hamilton kick) – 41–31 DAL
- 10:10 CLE – Otis Amey 20 yd pass from Raymond Philyaw (Jason Ball kick) – 41–38 DAL
- 6:59 DAL – Will Pettis 9 yd pass from Clint Dolezel (Remy Hamilton kick) – 48–38 DAL
- 2:27 CLE – Otis Amey 7 yd pass from Raymond Philyaw (Jason Ball kick) – 48–45 DAL

4th Quarter:

- 10:17 DAL – Will Pettis 2 yd run (Remy Hamilton kick) – 55–45 DAL
- 4:48 DAL – Marcus Nash 9 yd pass from Clint Dolezel (Remy Hamilton kick) – 62–45 DAL
- 2:38 CLE – Otis Amey 12 yd pass from Raymond Philyaw (Jason Ball kick) – 62–52 DAL
- 0:56 DAL – Will Pettis 2 yd pass from Clint Dolezel (Remy Hamilton kick failed) – 68–52 DAL
- Officials: N/A
- Offensive Player of the Game: Otis Amey (CLE)
- Defensive Player of the Game: Brandon Hefflin (CLE)
- Ironman Player of the Game: Will Pettis (DAL)

=== Week 15: vs. Chicago Rush ===
Quarter	1	2	3	4	Total
CHI	7	10	7	20	44
CLE	21	17	7	20	65

at Quicken Loans Arena, Cleveland, Ohio

- Date: June 7
- Game time: 7:00 PM EST
- Game attendance: 11,377

Game information

1st Quarter:

- 14:38 CLE – Otis Amey 45 yd pass from Raymond Philyaw (Jason Ball kick) – 7–0 CLE
- 11:56 CHI – Donovan Morgan 9 yd pass from Russ Michna (Paul Edinger kick) – 7–7
- 6:37 CLE – Joe Minucci 5 yd pass from Raymond Philyaw (Jason Ball kick) – 14–7 CLE
- 2:23 CLE – Otis Amey 50 yd missed FG return (Jason Ball kick) – 21–7 CLE

2nd Quarter:

- 11:39 CLE – Brandon Hefflin 45 yd interception return (Jason Ball kick) – 28–7 CLE
- 7:38 CHI – Paul Edinger 21 yd field goal – 28–10 CLE
- 5:45 CLE – Otis Amey 34 yd pass from Raymond Philyaw (Jason Ball kick) – 35–10 CLE
- 2:47 CHI – Travis LaTendresse 16 yd pass from Russ Michna (Paul Edinger kick) – 35–17 CLE
- 0:00 CLE – Jason Ball 19 yd field goal – 38–17 CLE

3rd Quarter:

- 10:17 CHI – Robert Boss 8 yd pass from Russ Michna (Paul Edinger kick) – 38–24 CLE
- 6:20 CLE – Otis Amey 13 yd pass from Raymond Philyaw (Jason Ball kick) – 45–24 CLE

4th Quarter:

- 14:19 CLE – Robert Redd 0 yd fumble recovery (Jason Ball kick blocked) – 51–24 CLE
- 12:24 CHI – Travis LaTendresse 12 yd pass from Russ Michna (Paul Edinger kick failed) – 51–30 CLE
- 8:02 CLE – Robert Redd 28 yd pass from Raymond Philyaw (Jason Ball kick) – 58–30 CLE
- 4:40 CHI – Travis LaTendresse 7 yd pass from Russ Michna (Paul Edinger kick) – 58–37 CLE
- 2:36 CLE – Ron Johnson 9 yd pass from Rohan Davey (Jason Ball kick) – 65–37 CLE
- 0:51 CHI – Damien Harrell 17 yd pass from Russ Michna (Paul Edinger kick) – 65–44 CLE
- Officials: Referee: Pat Garvey; Umpire: Paul King; Linesman: Bill Ward; Line judge: Bob McElwee; Back judge: James DeBell
- Offensive Player of the Game: Raymond Philyaw (CLE)
- Defensive Player of the Game: Brandon Hefflin (CLE)
- Ironman Player of the Game: Otis Amey (CLE)

=== Week 16: at Philadelphia Soul ===
Quarter	1	2	3	4	Total
CLE	14	21	13	13	61
PHI	20	21	7	14	62

at Wachovia Spectrum, Philadelphia, Pennsylvania

- Date: June 14
- Game time: 7:00 PM EST
- Game attendance: 16,637

Game information

1st Quarter:

- 14:31 PHI – HOLMES, Brent 38 yd pass from D'ORAZIO, Matt (HUGHES, Connor kick) – 7–0 PHI
- 11:36 PHI – HOLMES, Brent 14 yd pass from D'ORAZIO, Matt (HUGHES, Connor kick) – 14–0 PHI
- 8:36 CLE – JACKSON, Marlion 14 yd run (Jason Ball kick) – 14–7 PHI
- 4:22 PHI – JACKSON, Chris 24 yd pass from D'ORAZIO, Matt (HUGHES, Connor kick failed) – 20–7 PHI
- 2:12 CLE – REDD, Robert 22 yd pass from PHILYAW, Raymond (BALL, Jason kick) – 20–14 PHI

2nd Quarter:

- 12:03 PHI – D'ORAZIO, Matt 5 yd run (HUGHES, Connor kick) – 27–14 PHI
- 10:23 CLE – RUE, Joshua 2 yd run (BALL, Jason kick) – 27–21 PHI
- 4:47 PHI – JACKSON, Chris 5 yd pass from D'ORAZIO, Matt (HUGHES, Connor kick) – 34–21 PHI
- 2:28 CLE – AMEY, Otis 17 yd pass from PHILYAW, Raymond (BALL, Jason kick) – 34–28 PHI
- 0:39 PHI – OURS, Wes 2 yd run (HUGHES, Connor kick) – 41–28 PHI
- 0:11 CLE – AMEY, Otis 9 yd pass from PHILYAW, Raymond (BALL, Jason kick) – 41–35 PHI

3rd Quarter:

- 11:01 CLE – AMEY, Otis 8 yd pass from PHILYAW, Raymond (BALL, Jason kick failed) – 41–41
- 8:12 CLE – MARSHALL, Willis 1 yd run (BALL, Jason kick) – 48–41 CLE
- 2:48 PHI – SCOTT, Sean 7 yd pass from D'ORAZIO, Matt (HUGHES, Connor kick) – 48–48

4th Quarter:

- 3:15 PHI – D'ORAZIO, Matt 1 yd run (HUGHES, Connor kick) – 55–48 PHI
- 1:06 CLE – JACKSON, Marlion 22 yd pass from PHILYAW, Raymond (BALL, Jason kick) – 55–55
- 0:37 PHI – JACKSON, Chris 15 yd pass from D'ORAZIO, Matt (HUGHES, Connor kick) – 62–55 PHI
- 0:05 CLE – AMEY, Otis 9 yd pass from PHILYAW, Raymond (PHILYAW, Raymond pass intcpt) – 62–61 PHI
- Officials: Referee: Dave Cutaia; Umpire: Al Granado; Linesman: Mike McCabe; Line judge: Paul Lucky; Back judge: James Cole
- Offensive Player of the Game: Matt D'Orazio (PHI)
- Defensive Player of the Game: Bryan Save (PHI)
- Ironman Player of the Game: Rob Keefe (PHI)

=== Week 17: vs. Columbus Destroyers ===
Quarter	1	2	3	4	Total
CLB	7	14	7	7	35
CLE	7	21	3	16	47

at Quicken Loans Arena, Cleveland, Ohio

- Date: June 21
- Game time: 7:00 PM EST
- Game attendance: 14,397

Game information

1st Quarter:

- 12:52 CLB – WELLS 5 yd run (LEWIS kick) – 7–0 CLB
- 8:16 CLE – HYMES 13 yd pass from PHILYAW (BALL kick) – 7–7

2nd Quarter:

- 13:21 CLE – HYMES 43 yd pass from PHILYAW (BALL kick) – 14–7 CLE
- 10:30 CLB – JOHNSON 41 yd pass from NAGY (LEWIS kick) – 14–14
- 6:20 CLE – RILEY 6 yd pass from PHILYAW (BALL kick) – 21–14 CLE
- 0:49 CLB – NAGY 2 yd run (LEWIS kick) – 21–21
- 0:06 CLE – HYMES 16 yd pass from PHILYAW (BALL kick) – 28–21 CLE

3rd Quarter:

- 7:47 CLE – BALL 18 yd field goal – 31–21 CLE
- 4:05 CLB – WELLS 4 yd pass from NAGY (LEWIS kick) – 31–28 CLE

4th Quarter:

- 14:54 CLE – BALL 26 yd field goal – 34–28 CLE
- 8:07 CLE – AMEY 42 yd pass from PHILYAW (BALL kick failed) – 40–28 CLE
- 5:11 CLB – WELLS 6 yd pass from NAGY (LEWIS kick) – 40–35 CLE
- 2:55 CLE – AMEY 26 yd pass from PHILYAW (BALL kick) – 47–35 CLE
- Officials: Referee: Riley Johnson; Umpire: Rick Lowe; Linesman: Julian Mapp; Line judge: RG Detillier; Back judge: Bud McCleskey
- Offensive Player of the Game: Raymond Philyaw (CLE)
- Defensive Player of the Game: Sakeen Wright (CLE)
- Ironman Player of the Game: Karon Riley (CLE)

== Playoffs ==
=== National Conference Wild Card: vs. Orlando Predators ===
Quarter	1	2	3	4	Total
(5) ORL	20	13	20	13	66
(4) CLE	14	20	14	21	69

at Quicken Loans Arena, Cleveland, Ohio

- Date: June 30
- Game time: 7:00 PM EDT
- Game attendance: 13,896

Game information

1st Quarter:

- 13:10 ORL – GESSNER 10 yd pass from STAFFORD (FRANTZ kick) – 7–0 ORL
- 11:28 CLE – REDD 25 yd pass from PHILYAW (BALL kick) – 7–7
- 7:51 ORL – GESSNER 24 yd pass from STAFFORD (FRANTZ kick) – 14–7 ORL
- 4:29 CLE – MARSHALL 15 yd pass from PHILYAW (BALL kick) – 14–14
- 3:35 ORL – TOLIVER 57 yd kickoff return (FRANTZ kick failed) – 20–14 ORL

2nd Quarter:

- 11:55 ORL – GESSNER 4 yd pass from STAFFORD (FRANTZ kick failed) – 26–14 ORL
- 07:14 CLE – HYMES 29 yd pass from PHILYAW (BALL kick) – 26–21 ORL
- 2:41 CLE – BALL 23 yd field goal – 26–24 ORL
- 1:20 ORL – ARMSTRONG 31 yd pass from STAFFORD (FRANTZ kick) – 33–24 ORL
- 0:38 CLE – REDD 29 yd pass from PHILYAW (BALL kick) – 33–31 ORL
- 0:00 CLE – BALL 27 yd field goal – 34–33 CLE

3rd Quarter:

- 13:16 CLE – REDD 26 yd pass from PHILYAW (BALL kick) – 41–33 CLE
- 12:32 ORL – TOLIVER 24 yd pass from STAFFORD (FRANTZ rush fumbled) – 41–39 CLE
- 9:19 CLE – HYMES 14 yd pass from PHILYAW (BALL kick) – 48–39 CLE
- 7:05 ORL – TOLIVER 25 yd pass from STAFFORD (FRANTZ kick) – 48–46 CLE
- 2:30 ORL – TOLIVER 29 yd pass from STAFFORD (FRANTZ kick) – 53–48 ORL

4th Quarter:

- 13:59 CLE – REDD 29 yd pass from PHILYAW (BALL kick) – 55–53 CLE
- 9:33 ORL – STAFFORD 6 yd run (FRANTZ kick) – 60–55 ORL
- 6:49 CLE – HYMES 15 yd pass from PHILYAW (BALL kick) – 62–60 CLE
- 0:52 CLE – MARSHALL 8 yd run (BALL kick) – 69–60 CLE
- 0:21 ORL – TOLIVER 3 yd pass from STAFFORD (STAFFORD pass failed) – 69–66 CLE
- Officials: Referee: Perry Havener; Umpire: Tom Laverty; Linesman: Allen Baynes; Line judge: Darrel Leftwich; Back judge: James DeBell
- Offensive Players of the Game: Raymond Philyaw (CLE); Robert Redd (CLE)
- Defensive Player of the Game: Brandon Hefflin (CLE)
- Ironman Player of the Game: Willis Marshall (CLE)

=== National Conference Divisional: at Georgia Force ===
Quarter	1	2	3	4	Total
(4) CLE	7	33	20	13	73
(2) GA	14	28	7	21	70

at The Arena at Gwinnett Center, Duluth, Georgia

- Date: July 7
- Game time: 8:00 PM EDT
- Game attendance: 10,173

Game information

1st Quarter:

- 10:04 GA – JONES, Tiger 6 yd pass from GREISEN, Chris (MARTINEZ, Carlo kick) – 7–0 GA
- 4:27 CLE – RUE, Joshua 2 yd run (BALL, Jason kick) – 7–7
- 0:13 GA – BERGERON, Troy 4 yd pass from GREISEN, Chris (MARTINEZ, Carlo kick) – 14–7 GA

2nd Quarter:

- 13:46 CLE – AMEY, Otis 23 yd pass from PHILYAW, Raymon (BALL, Jason kick failed) – 14–13 GA
- 11:31 GA – JONES, Tiger 15 yd pass from GREISEN, Chris (MARTINEZ, Carlo kick) – 21–13 GA
- 9:30 CLE – AMEY, Otis 42 yd pass from PHILYAW, Raymon (BALL, Jason kick) – 21–20 GA
- 6:14 GA – HUEBNER, Matt 2 yd run (MARTINEZ, Carlo kick) – 28–20 GA
- 3:27 CLE – HYMES, Randy 33 yd pass from PHILYAW, Raymon (BALL, Jason kick) – 28–27 GA
- 2:49 CLE – HEFFLIN, Brando 3 yd net recovery (BALL, Jason kick failed) – 33–28 CLE
- 1:15 GA – BERGERON, Troy 7 yd pass from GREISEN, Chris (MARTINEZ, Carlo kick) – 35–33 GA
- 0:33 GA – BERGERON, Troy 21 yd pass from GREISEN, Chris (MARTINEZ, Carlo kick) – 42–33 GA
- 0:05 CLE – REDD, Robert 11 yd pass from PHILYAW, Raymon (BALL, Jason kick) – 42–40 GA

3rd Quarter:

- 12:01 CLE – RUE, Joshua 10 yd run (BALL, Jason kick failed) – 46–42 CLE
- 6:46 CLE – AMEY, Otis 7 yd pass from PHILYAW, Raymon (BALL, Jason kick) – 53–42 CLE
- 3:40 GA – JONES, Tiger 8 yd pass from GREISEN, Chris (MARTINEZ, Carlo kick) – 53–49 CLE
- 2:17 CLE – REDD, Robert 6 yd pass from PHILYAW, Raymon (BALL, Jason kick) – 60–49 CLE

4th Quarter:

- 11:12 GA – HUEBNER, Matt 2 yd run (MARTINEZ, Carlo kick) – 60–56 CLE
- 7:38 CLE – MARSHALL, Willi 35 yd pass from PHILYAW, Raymon (BALL, Jason kick) – 67–56 CLE
- 5:09 GA – JONES, Tiger 19 yd pass from GREISEN, Chris (MARTINEZ, Carlo kick) – 67–63 CLE
- 1:43 CLE – REDD, Robert 8 yd pass from PHILYAW, Raymon (BALL, Jason kick failed) – 73–63 CLE
- 0:08 GA – BERGERON, Troy 2 yd pass from GREISEN, Chris (MARTINEZ, Carlo kick) – 73–70 CLE
- Officials: Referee: Bill LeMonnier; Umpire: Paul King; Linesman: Jullian Mapp; Line judge: Dirk Bell; Back judge: Tony Lombardo
- Offensive Player of the Game: Chris Greisen (GA)
- Defensive Player of the Game: Will Thompson (GA)
- Ironman Player of the Game: Willis Marshall (CLE)

=== National Conference Championship: at Philadelphia Soul ===
Quarter	1	2	3	4	Total
(4) CLE	7	14	14	0	35
(1) PHI	14	21	21	14	70

at Wachovia Spectrum, Philadelphia, Pennsylvania

- Date: July 12
- Game time: 1:00 PM EDT
- Game attendance: 13,389

Game information

1st Quarter:

- 10:19 PHI – Larry Brackins 13 yd pass from Matt D'Orazio (Connor Hughes kick) – 7–0 PHI
- 6:28 CLE – Otis Amey 17 yd pass from Raymond Philyaw (Jason Ball kick) – 7–7
- 0:41 PHI – HOLMES 7 yd pass from Matt D'Orazio (Connor Hughes kick) – 14–7 PHI

2nd Quarter:

- 12:35 PHI – Chris Jackson 5 yd pass from Matt D'Orazio (Connor Hughes kick) – 21–7 PHI
- 8:07 PHI – Wes Ours 2 yd run (Connor Hughes kick) – 28–7 PHI
- 5:30 CLE – Otis Amey 8 yd pass from Raymond Philyaw (Jason Ball kick) – 28–14 PHI
- 4:36 PHI – Chris Jackson 9 yd pass from Matt D'Orazio (Connor Hughes kick) – 35–14 PHI
- 2:04 CLE – Marlion Jackson 4 yd run (Jason Ball kick) – 35–21 PHI

3rd Quarter:

- 12:52 PHI – Larry Brackins 17 yd pass from Matt D'Orazio (Connor Hughes kick) – 42–21 PHI
- 10:14 CLE – Robert Redd 16 yd pass from Raymond Philyaw (Jason Ball kick) – 42–28 PHI
- 9:30 PHI – Mike Brown 57 yd kickoff return (Connor Hughes kick) – 49–28 PHI
- 4:52 CLE – Robert Redd 22 yd pass from Raymond Philyaw (Jason Ball kick) – 49–35 PHI
- 3:55 PHI – Larry Brackins 18 yd pass from Matt D'Orazio (Connor Hughes kick) – 56–35 PHI

4th Quarter:

- 8:38 PHI – HOLMES 16 yd pass from Matt D'Orazio (Connor Hughes kick) – 63–35 PHI
- 1:31 PHI – HOLMES 2 yd pass from Matt D'Orazio (Connor Hughes kick) – 70–35 PHI
- Officials: Referee: Pat Garvey; Umpire: Rick Nelson; Linesman: Kavin McGrath; Line judge: Paul Engelberts; Back judge: Greg Wilson; Field judge: Alt: B. McElwee
- Offensive Player of the Game: Matt D'Orazio (PHI)
- Defensive Player of the Game: Eddie Moten (PHI)
- Ironman Player of the Game: Mike Brown (PHI)
