= 2007 San Jose SaberCats season =

Arena Football League team season

- Head coach: Darren Arbet
- Home stadium: HP Pavilion at San Jose

Results
- Record: 13–3
- Division place: 1st
- Playoffs: W ArenaBowl XXI 55–33 vs. Columbus

The 2007 San Jose SaberCats season was the 13th season for the franchise. They defeated the Columbus Destroyers 55–33 in ArenaBowl XXI to capture their 3rd Arena Football League title. San Jose ended the year on a 13-game winning streak including playoff games.

== Schedule ==
Week	Date	Opponent	Home/Away Game	Result
1	March 4	Los Angeles Avengers	Away	W 66–58
2	March 9	Chicago Rush	Away	L 48–45
4	March 24	Georgia Force	Away	L 64–62
5	March 31	Tampa Bay Storm	Home	W 69–49
6	April 6	Colorado Crush	Home	W 72–44
7	April 13	New Orleans VooDoo	Away	L 67–54
8	April 21	Los Angeles Avengers	Home	W 73–49
9	April 28	Utah Blaze	Home	W 69–48
10	May 5	Arizona Rattlers	Away	W 56–49
11	May 12	Las Vegas Gladiators	Home	W 61–34
12	May 19	Grand Rapids Rampage	Home	W 69–44
13	May 25	Nashville Kats	Away	W 48–34
14	June 1	Orlando Predators	Home	W 59–52
15	June 9	Utah Blaze	Away	W 70–49
16	June 16	Arizona Rattlers	Home	W 66–26
17	June 23	Las Vegas Gladiators	Away	W 73–46
Divisional	July 7	Colorado Crush	Home	W 76–67
AC Championship	July 14	Chicago Rush	Home	W 61–49
ArenaBowl XXI	June 23	Columbus Destroyers	Neutral	W 55–33

== Coaching ==
Darren Arbet entered his ninth season as SaberCats head coach.

== Final roster ==
2007 San Jose SaberCats roster
Quarterbacks: 16 Mark Grieb; 5 Craig Whelihan; Fullbacks: 27 Brian Johnson; 25 Matt Kinsinger; Wide receivers: 3 Jason Geathers; 80 Ben Nelson; 9 James Roe; 17 Rodney Wright	Offensive linemen: 93 Julius Gant; 23 Ronald Jones; 91 Dan Loney; 87 William Obeng; Defensive linemen: 77 Patrick Afif; 90 Garrett McIntyre; 97 George Williams III	Linebackers: 31 Phil Glover; 34 Steve Watson; Defensive backs: 19 Marquis Floyd; 4 Trestin George; 14 Omarr Smith; 8 Clevan Thomas; Kickers: 11 A. J. Haglund	Injured reserve: -- Jeff Littlejohn DL; -- Tim Martin OL; -- Chuck Reed OL; 15 Cleannord Saintil WR; League suspension: Currently vacant; Recallable reassignment: Currently vacant; Refuse to report: Currently vacant; Other league exempt: Currently vacant; Inactive Reserve: Currently vacant; Rookies in italics Roster updated February 7, 2014; 22 Active, 4 Inactive

== Stats ==
=== Offense ===
==== Quarterback ====
Player	Comp.	Att.	Comp%	Yards	TD's	INT's	Long	Rating
Mark Grieb	398	561	70.9	4605	100	13	47	125.3
Craig Whelihan	13	21	61.9	110	1	0	17	87.4

==== Running backs ====
Player	Car.	Yards	Avg.	TD's	Long
Brian Johnson	44	100	2.3	9	20
Matt Kinsinger	25	47	1.9	6	16
Mark Grieb	7	27	3.9	2	10
Phil Glover	12	10	.8	5	3
Rodney Wright	9	8	.9	2	3
Jason Geathers	2	0	0	0	1
Craig Whelihan	1	0	0	0	0

==== Wide receivers ====
Player	Rec.	Yards	Avg.	TD's	Long
James Roe	127	1560	12.3	40	34
Ben Nelson	101	1258	12.2	25	40
Rodney Wright	97	1072	11.1	10	43
Jason Geathers	54	509	9.4	11	34
Cleannord Saintil	16	182	11.4	7	47
Brian Johnson	8	104	13	0	19
George Williams III	5	16	3.2	5	5
Julius Grant	1	6	6	1	6
Garrett McIntyre	1	6	6	1	6
Matt Kinsinger	1	2	2	1	2

==== Touchdowns ====
Player	TD's	Rush	Rec	Ret	Pts
James Roe	40	0	40	0	240
Ben Nelson	25	0	25	0	150
Rodney Wright	15	2	10	3	90
Jason Geathers	11	0	11	0	66
Brian Johnson	10	9	0	1	60
Cleannord Saintil	7	0	7	0	48
Matt Kinsinger	7	6	1	0	42
Phil Glover	5	5	0	0	30
George Williams III	5	0	5	0	30
Trestin George	2	0	0	2	12
Mark Grieb	2	2	0	0	12
Marquis Floyd	1	0	0	1	12
Julius Gant	1	0	1	0	6
Garrett McIntyre	1	0	1	0	6

=== Defense ===
Player	Tackles	Solo	Assisted	Sack	Solo	Assisted	INT	Yards	TD's	Long
Omarr Smith	87.5	79	17	0	0	0	5	86	2	50
Clevan Thomas	86	76	20	0	0	0	9	119	2	45
Steve Watson	59.5	43	33	2	2	0	1	0	0	0
Marquis Floyd	56	46	20	0	0	0	6	55	1	46
Phil Glover	37	28	18	2	2	0	0	0	0	0
Jason Geathers	24.5	15	19	0	0	0	0	0	0	0
Alan Harper	20.5	15	11	2.5	2	1	0	0	0	0
Ronald Jones	19.5	18	3	7	7	0	0	0	0	0
A. J. Haglund	15.5	14	3	0	0	0	0	0	0	0
George Williams III	15.5	13	5	3.5	3	1	0	0	0	0
Trestin George	9	6	6	0	0	0	1	20	0	20
Tim Martin	8.5	4	9	1	1	0	0	0	0	0
Cleannord Saintil	8.5	6	5	0	0	0	0	0	0	0
Rodney Wright	8.5	7	3	0	0	0	0	0	0	0
Brian Johnson	5.5	3	5	0	0	0	0	0	0	0
Ben Nelson	5	4	2	0	0	0	0	0	0	0
Jeff Littlejohn	3.5	3	1	0	0	0	0	0	0	0
James Roe	3.5	3	1	0	0	0	0	0	0	0
Mark Grieb	2.5	2	1	0	0	0	0	0	0	0
William Obeng	2	2	0	0	0	0	0	0	0	0
Julius Gant	1.5	1	1	0	0	0	0	0	0	0
Matt Kinsinger	1	1	0	0	0	0	0	0	0	0
Patrick Afif	.5	0	1	0	0	0	0	0	0	0

=== Special teams ===
==== Kick return ====
Player	Ret	Yards	TD's	Long	Avg	Ret	Yards	TD's	Long	Avg
Trestin George	37	872	2	56	23.6	1	10	0	10	10
Rodney Wright	31	720	3	57	23.2	0	0	0	0	0
Jason Geathers	8	102	0	24	12.8	0	0	0	0	0
Omarr Smith	5	9	0	5	1.8	2	1	0	1	.5
Cleannord Saintil	2	8	0	6	4	0	0	0	0	0
Brian Johnson	1	7	0	7	7	0	0	0	0	0
Marquis Floyd	2	6	1	10	3	0	0	0	0	0
Julius Gant	1	0	0	0	0	0	0	0	0	0
Clevan Thomas	1	0	0	0	0	0	0	0	0	0
Tim Martin	0	0	0	0	0	1	0	0	0	0

==== Kicking ====
Player	Extra pt.	Extra pt. Att.	FG	FGA	Long	Pct.	Pts	TD's	Tackles
A. J. Haglund	128	138	10	18	39	0.556	158	1	15.5
