= 2008 San Jose SaberCats season =

Arena Football League team season

- Head coach: Darren Arbet
- Home stadium: HP Pavilion at San Jose

Results
- Record: 11–5
- Division place: 1st AC Western
- Playoffs: Won Divisional Playoffs (Crush) 64–51; Won Conference Championship (Rampage) 81–55; Lost ArenaBowl XXII (Soul) 56–59

The 2008 San Jose SaberCats season was the 14th season for the franchise. The SaberCats looked to improve on their 13–3 record from 2007 and defend their ArenaBowl title. Finishing the regular season with an 11–5 record, though not as successful as the previous season, still won them a third consecutive Western Division title, and they went into the playoffs as the 2nd seed in the American Conference. In their Divisional round game, they defeated the Colorado Crush, 64–51, to advance to the American Conference Championship. In that game, the SaberCats defeated the Grand Rapids Rampage 81–55, to advance to their second consecutive ArenaBowl. The SaberCats played the Philadelphia Soul in ArenaBowl XXII, which they lost, 59–56.

== Standings ==
Western Division
Team	W	L	PCT	PF	PA	DIV	CONF	Home	Away
San Jose SaberCats^{(2)}	11	5	.688	945	875	6–0	9–1	6–2	5–3
Arizona Rattlers^{(3)}	8	8	.500	842	907	1–5	3–7	3–5	5–3
Utah Blaze^{(4)}	6	10	.375	941	959	2–4	6–4	4–4	2–6
Los Angeles Avengers	5	11	.313	847	1004	3–3	4–6	4–4	1–7

== Regular season schedule ==
Week	Date	Opponent	Result	Record	Location	Attendance	Recap
1	March 3	at Chicago Rush	L 47–70	0–1	Allstate Arena	15,409	Recap
2	March 10	at Grand Rapids Rampage	W 66–58	1–1	Van Andel Arena	5,833	Recap
3	March 15	Arizona Rattlers	W 63–43	2–1	HP Pavilion	13,625	Recap
4	March 22	Dallas Desperados	L 56–59	2–2	HP Pavilion	11,472	Recap
5	March 29	at Kansas City Brigade	W 44–36	3–2	Sprint Center	13,146	Recap
6	April 5	at New Orleans VooDoo	L 43–72	3–3	New Orleans Arena	14,236	Recap
7	April 12	Philadelphia Soul	L 57–58	3–4	HP Pavilion	12,462	Recap
8	April 18	at Utah Blaze	W 61–40	4–4	EnergySolutions Arena	14,701	Recap
9	April 26	Los Angeles Avengers	W 70–42	5–4	HP Pavilion	13,083	Recap
10	May 3	at Orlando Predators	L 35–61	5–5	Amway Arena	11,733	Recap
11	May 9	at Arizona Rattlers	W 63–42	6–5	US Airways Center	11,514	Recap
12	May 17	Utah Blaze	W 74–64	7–5	HP Pavilion	13,252	Recap
13	May 24	Colorado Crush	W 59–42	8–5	HP Pavilion	13,147	Recap
14	May 31	at Los Angeles Avengers	W 66–56	9–5	Staples Center	15,174	Recap
15	Bye Week						
16	June 14	Tampa Bay Storm	W 73–70	10–5	HP Pavilion	14,042	Recap
17	June 21	Georgia Force	W 68–62	11–5	HP Pavilion	12,866	Recap

== Playoff schedule ==
Round	Date	Opponent (seed)	Result	Location	Attendance	Recap
AC Divisional	July 5	Colorado Crush (5)	W 64–51	HP Pavilion	12,479	Recap
AC Championship	July 12	Grand Rapids Rampage (6)	W 81–55	HP Pavilion	14,072	Recap
ArenaBowl XXII	July 27	vs. Philadelphia Soul (N1)	L 56–59	New Orleans Arena	17,244	Recap

== Staff ==
2008 San Jose SaberCats staff
Head coach: Head coach – Darren Arbet; Offensive coaches: Offensive coordinator – Terry Malley; Offensive line coach – Dave Witthun; Defensive coaches: Defensive / special teams coordinator – Jeff Jarnigan

== Final roster ==
2008 San Jose SaberCats roster
Quarterbacks: 16 Mark Grieb; 7 Scott Rislov; Fullbacks: 27 Brian Johnson; Wide receivers: 3 Jason Geathers; 88 Samora Goodson; 15 Cleannord Saintil; 17 Rodney Wright	Offensive linemen: 96 Gene Frederic; 93 Julius Gant; 91 Dan Loney; 81 Jason Thomas; Defensive linemen: 95 Andrew Browning; 99 Alan Harper; 23 Ronald Jones; 90 Garrett McIntyre; 97 George Williams	Linebackers: 40 Frank Carter; 34 Steve Watson; Defensive backs: 5 Toure Carter; 19 Marquis Floyd; 14 Omarr Smith; 8 Clevan Thomas; Kickers: 11 A. J. Haglund	Injury reserve: 13 Jamall Broussard WR (IR); 2 Brett Elliott QB (IR); 77 Chris Evans OL (IR); 4 Trestin George DB (IR); 92 Jeff Littlejohn DL (IR); 89 Chris Pino OL (IR); 9 James Roe WR (IR); 44 Daimon Shelton FB (IR); 73 Albert Toeaina OL (IR); 24 Rodney Van DB (IR); Refused to report: currently vacant; Other league exempt: currently vacant; Suspension: currently vacant; rookies in italics Roster updated October 7, 2008; 23 Active, 10 Inactive → More rosters

== Regular season ==
=== Week 1: at Chicago Rush ===
Quarter	1	2	3	4	Total
SJ	14	13	7	13	47
CHI	14	14	14	28	70

at Allstate Arena, Rosemont, Illinois

- Date: March 3
- Game time: 9:00 PM EST
- Game attendance: 15,409

Game information

1st Quarter:

- CHI- Damian Harrell 29 YD pass from Sherdrick Bonner (Dan Frantz kick) – 7–0 CHI
- CHI- DeJuan Alfonzo 20 YD fumble recovery (Dan Frantz kick) – 14–0 CHI
- SJ- James Roe 6 YD pass from Mark Grieb (A.J. Haglund kick) – 14–7 CHI
- SJ- Cleannord Saintil 16 YD pass from Mark Grieb (A.J. Haglund kick) – 14–14

2nd Quarter:

- SJ- Rodney Wright 6 YD pass from Mark Grieb (A.J. Haglund kick) – 21–14 SJ
- CHI- Donovan Morgan 28 YD pass from Sherdrick Bonner (Dan Frantz kick) – 21–21
- SJ- A.J. Haglund 25 YD field goal – 24–21 SJ
- CHI- Travis LaTendresse 8 YD pass from Sherdrick Bonner (Dan Frantz kick) 28–24 CHI
- SJ- A.J. Haglund 45 YD field goal – 28–27 CHI

3rd Quarter:

- CHI- Damian Harrell 33 YD pass from Sherdrick Bonner (Dan Frantz kick) – 35–27 CHI
- CHI- Travis LaTendresse 23 YD pass from Sherdrick Bonner (Dan Frantz kick) – 42–27 CHI
- SJ- Frank Carter 1 YD run (A.J. Haglund kick) – 42–34 CHI

4th Quarter:

- CHI- Dan Alexander 5 YD run (Dan Frantz kick) – 49–34 CHI
- CHI- Donovan Morgan 15 YD pass from Sherdrick Bonner (Dan Frantz kick) – 56–34 CHI
- SJ- Cleannord Saintil 31 YD pass from Mark Grieb (A.J. Haglund kick) – 56–41 CHI
- CHI- DeJuan Alfonzo 0 YD fumble recovery (Dan Frantz kick) – 63–41 CHI
- SJ- Rodney Wright 4 YD pass from Mark Grieb (Frank Carter rush failed) 63–47 CHI
- CHI- Russ Michna 2 YD run (Dan Frantz kick) 70–47 CHI
- Officials: Officials: Referee: Dave Cutaia; Umpire: Al Granado; Linesman: Mike McCabe; Line judge: Art Lucky; Back judge: James Cole
- Offensive Player of the Game: Damian Harrell
- Defensive Player of the Game: Dennison Robinson
- Ironman Player of the Game: DeJuan Alfonzo

=== Week 2: at Grand Rapids Rampage ===
Quarter	1	2	3	4	Total
SJ	14	21	14	17	66
GR	13	17	14	14	58

at Van Andel Arena, Grand Rapids, Michigan

- Date: March 10
- Game time: 7:00 PM EST
- Game attendance: 5,833

Game information

1st Quarter:

- 12:20 GR – HINES 15 yd pass from MCPHERSON (GOWINS kick failed) 6–0 GR
- 11:38 GR – HIGGINS 2 yd net recovery (GOWINS kick) – 13–0 GR
- 08:05 SJ – James Roe 8 yd pass from Mark Grieb (A.J. Haglund kick) – 13–7 GR
- 04:38 SJ – Ron Jones 12 yd fumble recovery (A.J. Haglund kick) 14–13 SJ

2nd Quarter:

- 14:22 SJ – Phil Glover 1 yd run (A.J. Haglund kick) – 21–13 SJ
- 10:20 GR – MCPHERSON 1 yd run (GOWINS kick) – 21–20 SJ
- 06:14 SJ – Rodney Wright 6 yd pass from Mark Grieb (A.J. Haglund kick) – 28–20 SJ
- 00:55 GR – MCPHERSON 1 yd run (GOWINS kick) – 28–27 SJ
- 00:45 SJ – Phil Glover 3 yd run (A.J. Haglund kick) – 35–27 SJ
- 00:05 GR – GOWINS 41 yd field goal – 35–30 SJ

3rd Quarter:

- 11:31 GR – HIGGINS 26 yd pass from MCPHERSON (GOWINS kick) – 37–35 GR
- 08:42 SJ – Rodney Wright 22 yd pass from Mark Grieb (A.J. Haglund kick) – 42–37 SJ
- 06:45 SJ – James Roe 2 yd pass from Mark Grieb (A.J. Haglund kick) – 49–37 SJ
- 04:18 GR – HIGGINS 22 yd pass from MCPHERSON (GOWINS kick) – 49–44 SJ

4th Quarter:

- 14:18 SJ – A.J. Haglund 23 yd field goal – 52–44 SJ
- 12:50 GR – HIGGINS 47 yd pass from MCPHERSON (GOWINS kick) – 52–21 SJ
- 08:52 SJ – Chris Pino 6 yd pass from Mark Grieb (A.J. Haglund kick) – 59–51 SJ
- 08:05 GR – HAWKINS 52 yd kickoff return (GOWINS kick) – 59–58 SJ
- 06:42 SJ – Rodney Wright 27 yd pass from Mark Grieb (A.J. Haglund kick) – 66–58 SJ
- Officials: Referee: Bill LeMonnier; Umpire: Jeff Carr; Linesman: Greg Shields; Line judge: Dave Chesney; Back judge: Billy Beckett
- Offensive Player of the Game: Mark Grieb (SJ)
- Defensive Player of the Game: Clevan Thomas (SJ)
- Ironman Player of the Game: Ahmad Hawkins (GR)

=== Week 3: vs. Arizona Rattlers ===
Quarter	1	2	3	4	Total
ARZ	7	0	7	29	43
SJ	10	17	12	24	63

at HP Pavilion at San Jose, San Jose, California

- Date: March 15
- Game time: 10:30 PM EST
- Game attendance: 13,625

Game information

1st Quarter:

- 06:31 SJ – HAGLUND, A.J. 33 yd field goal – 3–0 SJ
- 03:32 ARZ – FAOA, Asi 4 yd run (WITCZAK, Jason kick) – 7–3 ARZ
- 01:07 SJ – SAINTIL, Cleann 22 yd pass from GRIEB, Mark (HAGLUND, A.J. kick) – 10–7 SJ

2nd Quarter:

- 13:04 SJ – THOMAS, Clevan 16 yd fumble recovery (HAGLUND, A.J. kick) – 17–7 SJ
- 09:05 SJ – SAINTIL, Cleann 23 yd pass from GRIEB, Mark (HAGLUND, A.J. kick) – 24–7 SJ
- 00:11 SJ – HAGLUND, A.J. 18 yd field goal – 27–7 SJ

3rd Quarter:

- 12:54 ARZ – FAOA, Asi 1 yd run (WITCZAK, Jason kick) – 27–14 SJ
- 08:44 SJ – HAGLUND, A.J. 24 yd field goal – 30–14 SJ
- 05:15 SJ – TEAM safety – 32–14 SJ
- 04:11 SJ – GANT, Julius 12 yd pass from GRIEB, Mark (HAGLUND, A.J. kick) – 39–14 SJ

4th Quarter:

- 14:46 ARZ – JAMES, Jerrian 6 yd pass from SMOKER, Jeff (WITCZAK, Jason kick) – 39–21 SJ
- 13:40 ARZ – TRUFANT, Isaiah 5 yd net recovery (WITCZAK, Jason kick) – 39–28 SJ
- 11:50 SJ – GEATHERS, Jason 1 yd run (HAGLUND, A.J. kick) – 46–28 SJ
- 09:42 ARZ – JAMES, Jerrian 36 yd pass from SMOKER, Jeff (JONES, Brian rush) – 46–36 SJ
- 03:48 SJ – GEATHERS, Jason 1 yd run (HAGLUND, A.J. kick) – 53–36 SJ
- 01:18 ARZ – HARRIS, Atnaf 49 yd pass from SMOKER, Jeff (WITCZAK, Jason kick) – 53–43 SJ
- 00:41 SJ – HAGLUND, A.J. 17 yd field goal – 56–43 SJ
- 00:16 SJ – GLOVER, Phil 4 yd run (HAGLUND, A.J. kick) – 63–43 SJ
- Officials: Referee: Bill Athan; Umpire: Matt Jordan; Linesman: Kavin McGrath; Line judge: Rusty Baynes; Back judge: Greg Wilson
- Offensive Player of the Game: A.J. Haglund (SJ)
- Defensive Player of the Game: Clevan Thomas (SJ)
- Ironman Player of the Game: Cleannord Santil (SJ)

=== Week 4: vs. Dallas Desperados ===
Quarter	1	2	3	4	Total
DAL	13	16	6	24	59
SJ	7	21	7	21	56

at HP Pavilion at San Jose, San Jose, California

- Date: March 22
- Game time: 10:30 PM EST
- Game attendance: 11,472

Game information

1st Quarter:

- 07:12 DAL – WHITE, Josh 1 yd run (HAMILTON, Remy kick) – 7–0 DAL
- 03:18 SJ – GRIEB, Mark 3 yd run (HAGLUND, A.J. kick) – 7–7
- 00:47 DAL – NASH, Marcus 6 yd pass from SANDERS, Chris (HAMILTON, Remy kick failed) – 13–7 DAL

2nd Quarter:

- 11:36 SJ – SAINTIL, Cleannord 7 yd pass from GRIEB, Mark (HAGLUND, A.J. kick) – 14–13 SJ
- 07:23 DAL – PETTIS, Will 3 yd run (HAMILTON, Remy kick) – 20–14 DAL
- 03:43 SJ – GEATHERS, Jason 10 yd pass from GRIEB, Mark (HAGLUND, A.J. kick) – 21–20 SJ
- 00:56 DAL – NASH, Marcus 20 yd pass from SANDERS, Chris (HAMILTON, Remy kick failed) – 26–21 DAL
- 00:28 SJ – SAINTIL, Cleannord 5 yd pass from GRIEB, Mark (HAGLUND, A.J. kick) – 28–26 SJ
- 00:03 DAL – HAMILTON, Remy 25 yd field goal – 29–28 DAL

3rd Quarter:

- 08:07 DAL – ARMSTRONG, Anth 13 yd pass from SANDERS, Chris (HAMILTON, Remy kick failed) – 35–28 DAL
- 01:17 SJ – JOHNSON, Brian 1 yd run (HAGLUND, A.J. kick) – 35–35

4th Quarter:

- 13:38 DAL – DOTSY, Terrance 5 yd pass from SANDERS, Chris (HAMILTON, Remy kick) – 42–35 DAL
- 10:21 SJ – SAINTIL, Cleannord 7 yd pass from GRIEB, Mark (HAGLUND, A.J. kick) – 42–42
- 09:08 DAL – ARMSTRONG, Anthony 4 yd pass from SANDERS, Chris (HAMILTON, Remy kick) – 49–42 DAL
- 04:53 SJ – ROE, James 8 yd pass from GRIEB, Mark (HAGLUND, A.J. kick) – 49–49
- 03:42 DAL – ARMSTRONG, Anthony 48 yd pass from SANDERS, Chris (HAMILTON, Remy kick) – 56–49 DAL
- 00:34 DAL – HAMILTON, Remy 45 yd field goal – 59–49 DAL
- 00:00 SJ – ROE, James 10 yd pass from GRIEB, Mark (HAGLUND, A.J. kick) – 59–56 DAL
- Officials: Dennis Lipski, Rick Nelson, Brent Durbin, Darrell Leftwic, Reggie Smith, David Harwood
- Offensive Player of the Game: Cleannord Saintil (SJ)
- Defensive Player of the Game: Johnnie Harris (DAL)
- Ironman Player of the Game: Josh White (DAL)

=== Week 5: at Kansas City Brigade ===
Quarter	1	2	3	4	Total
SJ	14	10	14	6	44
KC	7	14	7	8	36

at Sprint Center, Kansas City, Missouri

- Date: March 29
- Game time: 6:30 PM EST
- Game attendance: 13,146

Game information

1st Quarter:

- 12:36 KC – John Fitzgerald 3 yd run (Peter Martinez kick) – 7–0 KC
- 08:31 SJ – Brian Johnson 2 yd run (A.J. Haglund kick) – 7–7
- 00:10 SJ – Brian Johnson 1 yd run (A.J. Haglund kick) – 14–7 SJ

2nd Quarter:

- 12:29 KC – Dawan Moss 13 yd pass from John Fitzgerald (Peter Martinez kick) – 14–14
- 08:55 SJ – Brian Johnson 1 yd run (A.J. Haglund kick) – 21–14 SJ
- 07:44 KC – John Fitzgerald 1 yd run (Peter Martinez kick) – 21–21
- 00:00 SJ – A.J. Haglund 21 yd field goal – 24–21 SJ

3rd Quarter:

- 12:41 KC – Charles Frederick 14 yd pass from John Fitzgerald (Peter Martinez kick) – 28–24 KC
- 09:39 SJ – Jason Geathers 10 yd pass from Mark Grieb (A.J. Haglund kick) – 31–28 SJ
- 01:33 SJ – Rodney Wright 9 yd run (A.J. Haglund kick) – 38–28 SJ

4th Quarter:

- 12:50 SJ – A.J. Haglund 30 yd field goal – 41–28 SJ
- 04:55 SJ – A.J. Haglund 35 yd field goal – 44–28 SJ
- 03:25 KC – Charles Frederick 30 yd pass from John Fitzgerald (Jerel Myers pass from FITZGERALD) – 44–36 SJ
- Officials: Referee: Tom McCabe; Umpire: Rick Podraza; Linesman: Rod Pearson; Line judge: Dana McKenzie; Back judge: Scott Helverson
- Offensive Player of the Game: Rodney Wright (SJ)
- Defensive Player of the Game: Will Holder (SJ)
- Ironman Player of the Game: A.J. Haglund (SJ)

=== Week 6: at New Orleans VooDoo ===
Quarter	1	2	3	4	Total
SJ	7	10	7	19	43
NO	14	27	14	17	72

at New Orleans Arena, New Orleans, Louisiana

- Date: April 5
- Game time: 7:00 PM EST
- Game attendance: 14,236

Game information

1st Quarter:

- 11:33 SJ – Saintil, C. 4 yd pass from Grieb, M. (Haglund, A.J. kick) – 7–0 SJ
- 09:30 NO – Dudley, J. 47 yd pass from Wimprine, D. (Romero, A. kick) – 7–7
- 05:16 NO – Spears, C. 49 yd interception return (Romero, A. kick) – 14–7 NO

2nd Quarter:

- 14:57 SJ – Haglund, A.J. 19 yd field goal – 14–10 NO
- 12:24 NO – Jordan, J. 26 yd pass from Wimprine, D. (Romero, A. kick) – 21–10 NO
- 08:07 SJ – Saintil, C. 9 yd pass from Grieb, M. (Haglund, A.J. kick) – 21–17 NO
- 02:10 NO – Jordan, J. 4 yd pass from Wimprine, D. (Romero, A. kick) – 28–17 NO
- 00:46 NO – LeJeune, N. 32 yd interception return (Romero, A. kick failed) – 34–17 NO
- 00:09 NO – Jordan, J. 3 yd pass from Wimprine, D. (Romero, A. kick) – 41–17 NO

3rd Quarter:

- 09:41 NO – Williams, W. 3 yd run (Romero, A. kick) – 48–17 NO
- 06:14 NO – Jones, T. 7 yd pass from Wimprine, D. (Romero, A. kick) – 55–17 NO
- 00:47 SJ – Saintil, C. 3 yd pass from Grieb, M. (Haglund, A.J. kick) – 55–24 NO

4th Quarter:

- 12:25 NO – Wimprine, D. 2 yd run (Romero, A. kick) – 62–24 NO
- 10:19 SJ – Geathers, J. 10 yd pass from Grieb, M. (Haglund, A.J. kick) – 62–31 NO
- 07:57 NO – Romero, A. 36 yd field goal – 65–31 NO
- 05:31 SJ – Carter, F. 6 yd pass from Grieb, M. (Haglund, A.J. kick failed) – 65–37 NO
- 04:30 NO – Williams, W. 45 yd pass from Bellisari, S. (Romero, A. kick) – 72–37 NO
- 00:45 SJ – Geathers, J. 3 yd pass from Grieb, M. (Rislov, S. pass failed) – 72–43 NO
- Officials: Referee: Perry Havener; Umpire: Tom Laverty; Linesman: Kevin McGrath; Line judge: David Meslow; Back judge: K. Washington
- Offensive Player of the Game: Danny Wimprine (NO)
- Defensive Player of the Game: Calvin Spears (NO)
- Ironman Player of the Game: Wendall Williams (NO)

=== Week 7: vs. Philadelphia Soul ===
Quarter	1	2	3	4	Total
PHI	0	14	14	30	58
SJ	20	13	7	17	57

at HP Pavilion at San Jose, San Jose, California

- Date: April 12
- Game time: 10:30 PM EST
- Game attendance: 12462

Game information

1st Quarter:

- 11:35 SJ – WRIGHT, Rodney 10 yd pass from GRIEB, Mark (HAGLUND, A.J. kick failed) – 6–0 SJ
- 04:02 SJ – CARTER, Frank 1 yd run (HAGLUND, A.J. kick) – 13–0 SJ
- 00:20 SJ – ROE, James 7 yd pass from GRIEB, Mark (HAGLUND, A.J. kick) – 20–0 SJ

2nd Quarter:

- 10:49 PHI – WATTS, Darius 20 yd pass from D'ORAZIO, Matt (HUGHES, Connor kick) – 20–7 SJ
- 07:47 SJ – CARTER, Frank 1 yd run (HAGLUND, A.J. pass failed) – 26–7 SJ
- 00:49 SJ – SAINTIL, Cleann 22 yd pass from GRIEB, Mark (HAGLUND, A.J. kick) – 33–7 SJ
- 00:10 PHI – SMITH, Clifton 1 yd run (HUGHES, Connor kick) – 33–14 SJ

3rd Quarter:

- 14:28 PHI – BRACKINS, Larry 17 yd pass from D'ORAZIO, Matt (HUGHES, Connor kick) – 33–21 SJ
- 12:17 SJ – ROE, James 5 yd pass from GRIEB, Mark (HAGLUND, A.J. kick) – 40–21 SJ
- 04:49 PHI – BRACKINS, Larry 4 yd pass from D'ORAZIO, Matt (HUGHES, Connor kick) – 40–28 SJ

4th Quarter:

- 13:05 PHI – JACKSON, Chris 13 yd pass from D'ORAZIO, Matt (HUGHES, Connor kick) – 40–35 SJ
- 07:44 SJ – ROE, James 11 yd pass from GRIEB, Mark (HAGLUND, A.J. kick) – 47–35 SJ
- 06:46 PHI – BROWN, Mike 57 yd kickoff return (HUGHES, Connor kick) – 47–42 PHI
- 01:45 SJ – HAGLUND, A.J. 34 yd field goal – 50–42 SJ
- 01:00 PHI – JACKSON, Chris 41 yd pass from D'ORAZIO, Matt (BRACKINS, Larry pass from D'ORAZIO, Matt) – 50–50
- 00:49 SJ – WRIGHT, Rodney 30 yd pass from GRIEB, Mark (HAGLUND, A.J. kick) – 57–50 SJ
- 00:10 PHI – D'ORAZIO, Matt 5 yd run (SMITH, Clifton rush) – 58–57 PHI
- Officials: Referee: Bill Athan; Umpire: Paul King; Linesman: Bill Ward; Line judge: Bob McElwee; Back judge: James DeBell
- Offensive Player of the Game: Chris Jackson (PHI)
- Defensive Player of the Game: Marquis Floyd (SJ)
- Ironman Player of the Game: Mike Brown (PHI)

=== Week 8: at Utah Blaze ===
Quarter	1	2	3	4	Total
SJ	7	27	3	24	61
UTA	10	17	6	7	40

at EnergySolutions Arena, Salt Lake City, Utah

- Date: April 18
- Game time: 9:00 PM EST
- Game attendance: 14,701

Game information

1st Quarter:

- 12:35 UTA – Kelvin Morris 45 yd fumble recovery (Steve Azar kick) – 7–0 UTA
- 08:53 SJ – Frank Carter 1 yd run (A.J. Haglund kick) – 7–7
- 01:49 UTA – Steve Azar 23 yd field goal – 10–7 UTA

2nd Quarter:

- 13:29 SJ – Jason Geathers 34 yd pass from Mark Grieb (A.J. Haglund kick) – 14–10 SJ
- 09:24 UTA – J. J. McKelvey 13 yd pass from Joe Germaine (Steve Azar kick) – 17–14 UTA
- 06:31 SJ – James Roe 23 yd pass from Mark Grieb (A.J. Haglund kick) – 21–17 SJ
- 00:54 UTA – Steve Azar 28 yd field goal – 21–20 SJ
- 00:43 SJ – James Roe 14 yd pass from Mark Grieb (A.J. Haglund kick failed) – 27–20 SJ
- 00:36 UTA – Aaron Boone 8 yd pass from Joe Germaine (Steve Azar kick) – 27–27
- 00:06 SJ – James Roe 9 yd pass from Mark Grieb (A.J. Haglund kick) – 34–27 SJ

3rd Quarter:

- 11:12 UTA – JJ McKelvey 15 yd pass from Joe Germaine (Steve Azar kick failed) – 34–33 SJ
- 04:21 SJ – A.J. Haglund 26 yd field goal – 37–33 SJ

4th Quarter:

- 11:56 SJ – Cleannord Saintil 21 yd pass from Mark Grieb (A.J. Haglund kick) – 44–33 SJ
- 07:40 SJ – Frank Carter 1 yd run (A.J. Haglund kick) – 51–33 SJ
- 06:28 SJ – Jason Geathers 9 yd fumble recovery (A.J. Haglund kick) – 58–33 SJ
- 00:51 SJ – A.J. Haglund 47 yd field goal – 61–33 SJ
- 00:00 UTA – JJ McKelvey 1 yd pass from Jason Gesser (Steve Azar kick) – 61–40 SJ
- Officials: Referee: Dave Lambros; Umpire: Doug Wilson; Linesman: Kelly Saalfeld; Line judge: Brian Matthew; Back judge: Rich Wilborn
- Offensive Player of the Game: Mark Grieb (SJ)
- Defensive Player of the Game: Kelvin Morris (UTA)
- Ironman Player of the Game: Jason Geathers (SJ)

=== Week 9: vs. Los Angeles Avengers ===
Quarter	1	2	3	4	Total
LA	14	9	13	6	42
SJ	20	19	10	21	70

at HP Pavilion at San Jose, San Jose, California

- Date: April 26
- Game time: 10:30 PM EST
- Game attendance: 13,083

Game information

1st Quarter:

- 12:08 SJ – SAINTIL, Cleann 15 yd pass from GRIEB, Mark (HAGLUND, A.J. kick) – 7–0 SJ
- 08:29 LA – HARRELL, Clay 11 yd pass from HICKS, Tim (FREDRICKSON, Ty kick) – 7–7
- 03:09 SJ – WRIGHT, Rodney 9 yd pass from GRIEB, Mark (HAGLUND, A.J. kick blocked) – 13–7 SJ
- 01:45 SJ – SAINTIL, Cleann 14 yd pass from GRIEB, Mark (HAGLUND, A.J. kick) – 20–7 SJ
- 00:32 LA – MARSHALL, Timon 43 yd pass from HICKS, Tim (FREDRICKSON, Ty kick) – 20–14 SJ

2nd Quarter:

- 11:59 SJ – ROE, James 9 yd pass from GRIEB, Mark (HAGLUND, A.J. kick) – 27–14 SJ
- 07:03 SJ – HAGLUND, A.J. 35 yd field goal – 30–14 SJ
- 03:55 SJ – SAINTIL, Cleann 14 yd pass from GRIEB, Mark (HAGLUND, A.J. kick blocked) – 36–14 SJ
- 03:55 LA – WHEELER, Damen PAT return – 36–16 SJ
- 00:29 LA – FORD. Lonnie 3 yd run (FREDRICKSON, Ty kick) – 36–23 SJ
- 00:00 SJ – HAGLUND, A.J. 35 yd field goal – 39–23 SJ

3rd Quarter:

- 11:42 LA – WARD, LaShaun 13 yd pass from HICKS, Tim (FREDRICKSON, Ty rush failed) – 39–29 SJ
- 11:03 SJ – WRIGHT, Rodney 56 yd kickoff return (HAGLUND, A.J. kick) – 46–29 SJ
- 03:00 SJ – HAGLUND, A.J. 18 yd field goal – 49–29 SJ
- 00:37 LA – MARSHALL, Timon 24 yd pass from HICKS, Tim (FREDRICKSON, Ty kick) – 49–36 SJ

4th Quarter:

- 14:53 SJ – WRIGHT, Rodney 21 yd pass from GRIEB, Mark (HAGLUND, A.J. kick) – 56–36 SJ
- 11:09 SJ – ROE, James 7 yd pass from GRIEB, Mark (HAGLUND, A.J. kick) – 63–36 SJ
- 06:24 SJ – THOMAS, Clevan 48 yd interception return (HAGLUND, A.J. kick) – 70–36 SJ
- 02:46 LA – WARD, LaShaun 32 yd pass from CUMBIE, Sonny (FREDRICKSON, Ty kick failed) – 70–42 SJ
- Officials: Referee: Riley Johnson; Umpire: Rick Podraza; Linesman: Julian Mapp; Line judge: R.G. Detiller; Back judge: Bud McCleskey
- Offensive Player of the Game: Mark Grieb (SJ)
- Defensive Player of the Game: Omarr Smith (SJ)
- Ironman Player of the Game: Rodney Wright (SJ)

=== Week 10: at Orlando Predators ===
Quarter	1	2	3	4	Total
SJ	7	0	21	7	35
ORL	17	10	14	20	61

at Amway Arena, Orlando, Florida

- Date: May 3
- Game time: 7:30 PM EST
- Game attendance: 11,733

Game information

1st Quarter:

- 12:00 ORL – VAUGHN, John 28 yd field goal – 3–0 ORL
- 11:23 ORL – PERRY, Jason 0 yd fumble recovery (VAUGHN, John kick) – 10–0 ORL
- 09:22 SJ – ROE, James 20 yd pass from GRIEB, Mark (HAGLUND, A.J. kick) – 10–7 ORL
- 00:28 ORL – MCENTYRE, Kenny 9 yd interception return (VAUGHN, John kick) – 17–7 ORL

2nd Quarter:

- 06:17 ORL – TOLIVER, T.T. 9 yd pass from STAFFORD, Shane (VAUGHN, John kick) – 24–7 ORL
- 00:55 ORL – VAUGHN, John 28 yd field goal – 27–7 ORL

3rd Quarter:

- 12:41 SJ – ROE, James 10 yd pass from GRIEB, Mark (HAGLUND, A.J. kick) – 27–14 ORL
- 07:33 SJ – WRIGHT, Rodney 7 yd pass from GRIEB, Mark (HAGLUND, A.J. kick) – 27–21 ORL
- 06:41 ORL – TOLIVER, T.T. 58 yd kickoff return (VAUGHN, John kick) – 34–21 ORL
- 03:39 SJ – SAINTIL, C. 4 yd pass from GRIEB, Mark (HAGLUND, A.J. kick) – 34–28 ORL
- 00:07 ORL – JOHNSON, Ron 7 yd pass from EATON, Jake (VAUGHN, John kick) – 41–28 ORL

4th Quarter:

- 14:19 SJ – ROE, James 5 yd pass from GRIEB, Mark (HAGLUND, A.J. kick) – 41–35 ORL
- 05:13 ORL – EATON, Jake 6 yd run (EATON, Jake pass failed) – 47–35 ORL
- 03:08 ORL – EATON, Jake 5 yd run (VAUGHN, John kick) – 54–35 ORL
- 00:41 ORL – MCENTYRE, Kenny 47 yd interception return (VAUGHN, John kick) – 61–35 ORL
- Officials: Referee: Dennis Lipski; Umpire: Rick Nelson; Linesman: Brent Durbin; Line judge: Darrel Leftwich; Back judge: Reggie Smith
- Offensive Player of the Game: Jake Eaton (ORL)
- Defensive Player of the Game: Kenny McEntyre (ORL)
- Ironman Player of the Game: T.T. Toliver (ORL)

=== Week 11: at Arizona Rattlers ===
Quarter	1	2	3	4	Total
SJ	7	21	14	21	63
ARZ	7	20	8	7	42

at US Airways Center, Phoenix, Arizona

- Date: May 9
- Game time: 10:00 PM EST
- Game attendance: 11,514

Game information

1st Quarter:

- 10:42 ARZ – SAUNDERS 9 yd pass from SMOKER (HOULE kick) – 7–0 ARZ
- 04:44 SJ – ROE 4 yd pass from GRIEB (HAGLUND kick) – 7–7

2nd Quarter:

- 12:59 ARZ – HOULE 35 yd field goal – 10–7 ARZ
- 10:11 SJ – SAINTIL 3 yd pass from GRIEB (HAGLUND kick) – 14–10 SJ
- 06:34 ARZ – HARVEY 16 yd pass from SMOKER (HOULE kick) – 17–14 ARZ
- 03:46 SJ – WRIGHT 3 yd pass from GRIEB (HAGLUND kick) – 21–17 SJ
- 00:40 ARZ – ROBINSON 4 yd run (HOULE kick) – 24–21 ARZ
- 00:11 SJ – ROE 1 yd pass from GRIEB (HAGLUND kick) – 28–24 SJ
- 00:00 ARZ – HOULE 43 yd field goal – 28–27 SJ

3rd Quarter:

- 09:59 SJ – WRIGHT 1 yd pass from GRIEB (HAGLUND kick) – 35–27 SJ
- 06:56 ARZ – BURLEY 10 yd pass from SMOKER (ROBINSON rush) – 35–35
- 05:46 SJ – WRIGHT 9 yd pass from GRIEB (HAGLUND kick) – 42–35 SJ

4th Quarter:

- 14:56 ARZ – BURLEY 14 yd pass from SMOKER (HOULE kick) – 42–42
- 13:46 SJ – WRIGHT 31 yd pass from GRIEB (HAGLUND kick) – 49–42 SJ
- 09:36 SJ – ROE 6 yd pass from GRIEB (HAGLUND kick) – 56–42 SJ
- 00:50 SJ – JOHNSON 6 yd run (HAGLUND kick) – 63–42 SJ
- Officials: Referee: HAVENER, Perry; Umpire: LAVERTY, Tom; Linesman: MCGRATH, Kavin; Line judge: MESLOW, Devid; Back judge: WASHINGTON, Kei
- Offensive Player of the Game: Mark Grieb (SJ)
- Defensive Player of the Game: Marquis Floyd (SJ)
- Ironman Player of the Game: Jerrian James (ARZ)

=== Week 12: vs. Utah Blaze ===
Quarter	1	2	3	4	Total
UTA	14	28	7	15	64
SJ	14	28	15	17	74

at HP Pavilion at San Jose, San Jose, California

- Date: May 17
- Game time: 10:30 PM EST
- Game attendance: 13,252

Game information

1st Quarter:

- 13:22 SJ – ROE, James 4 yd pass from GRIEB, Mark (HAGLUND, A.J. kick) – 7–0 SJ
- 09:34 UTA – FILER, Rodney 1 yd run (VIDETICH, Steve kick) – 7–7
- 08:25 SJ – SAINTIL, Cleann 28 yd pass from GRIEB, Mark (HAGLUND, A.J. kick) – 14–7 SJ
- 06:13 UTA – WHITTAKER, Huey 22 yd pass from GERMAINE, Joe (VIDETICH, Steve kick) – 14–14

2nd Quarter:

- 14:54 UTA – MCKELVEY, J.J. 14 yd pass from GERMAINE, Joe (VIDETICH, Steve kick) – 21–14 UTA
- 13:38 SJ – WRIGHT, Rodney 41 yd pass from GRIEB, Mark (HAGLUND, A.J. kick) – 21–21
- 12:36 UTA – BOONE, Aaron 26 yd pass from GERMAINE, Joe (VIDETICH, Steve kick) 28–21 UTA
- 09:25 SJ – ROE, James 3 yd pass from GRIEB, Mark (HAGLUND, A.J. kick) – 28–28
- 04:58 UTA – WHITTAKER, Huey 3 yd run (VIDETICH, Steve kick) 35–28 UTA
- 00:42 SJ – GEATHERS, Jason 1 yd run (HAGLUND, A.J. kick) – 35–35
- 00:37 UTA – MCKELVEY, J.J. 11 yd pass from GERMAINE, Joe (VIDETICH, Steve kick) – 42–35 SJ
- 00:17 SJ – ROE, James 5 yd pass from GRIEB, Mark (HAGLUND, A.J. kick) – 42–42

3rd Quarter:

- 14:30 SJ – SAINTIL, Cleann 8 yd pass from GRIEB, Mark (HAGLUND, A.J. kick failed) – 48–42 SJ
- 07:38 UTA – WHITTAKER, Huey 10 yd pass from GERMAINE, Joe (VIDETICH, Steve kick) – 49–48 UTA
- 04:56 SJ – SAINTIL, Cleann 9 yd pass from GRIEB, Mark (HAGLUND, A.J. kick) – 55–49 SJ
- 03:38 SJ – WATSON, Steve safety – 57–49 SJ

4th Quarter:

- 13:35 SJ – HAGLUND, A.J. 24 yd field goal – 60–49 SJ
- 12:02 SJ – WRIGHT, Rodney 15 yd pass from GRIEB, Mark (HAGLUND, A.J. kick) – 67–49
- 05:34 UTA – WHITTAKER, Huey 6 yd run (VIDETICH, Steve kick) – 67–56 SJ
- 01:15 UTA – MCKELVEY, J.J. 7 yd pass from GERMAINE, Joe (WHITTAKER, Huey pass from GERMAINE, Joe) – 67–64 SJ
- 00:53 SJ – ROE, James 9 yd pass from GRIEB, Mark (HAGLUND, A.J. kick) – 74–64 SJ
- Officials: Referee: Dave Cutaia; Umpire: Wes Fritz; Linesman: Neil Brunner; Line judge: Art Lucky; Back judge: Tony Lombardo
- Offensive Player of the Game: Mark Grieb (SJ)
- Defensive Player of the Game: Garrett McIntyre (SJ)
- Ironman Player of the Game: Jason Geathers (SJ)

=== Week 13: vs. Colorado Crush ===
Quarter	1	2	3	4	Total
COL	14	14	7	7	42
SJ	14	21	7	17	59

at HP Pavilion at San Jose, San Jose, California

- Date: May 24
- Game time: 10:30 PM EST
- Game attendance: 13,147

Game information

1st Quarter:

- 14:20 COL – OWENS, Chad 40 yd pass from DUTTON, John (YAUSSI, Deric kick) – 7–0 COL
- 06:04 SJ – ROE, James 4 yd pass from GRIEB, Mark (HAGLUND, A.J. kick) – 7–7
- 02:57 COL – NELSON, Ben 17 yd pass from DUTTON, John (YAUSSI, Deric kick) – 14–7 COL
- 01:36 SJ – SAINTIL, Cleann 6 yd pass from GRIEB, Mark (HAGLUND, A.J. kick) – 14–14

2nd Quarter:

- 11:30 SJ – SAINTIL, Cleann 8 yd pass from GRIEB, Mark (HAGLUND, A.J. kick) – 21–14 SJ
- 06:19 SJ – WRIGHT, Rodney 31 yd pass from GRIEB, Mark (HAGLUND, A.J. kick) – 28–14 SJ
- 02:09 COL – NELSON, Ben 3 yd pass from DUTTON, John (YAUSSI, Deric kick) – 28–21 SJ
- 00:03 SJ – WRIGHT, Rodney 7 yd pass from GRIEB, Mark (HAGLUND, A.J. kick) – 35–21 SJ
- 00:00 COL – HOSACK, Aaron 2 yd pass from DUTTON, John (YAUSSI, Deric kick) – 35–28 SJ

3rd Quarter:

- 13:54 SJ – ROE, James 23 yd pass from GRIEB, Mark (HAGLUND, A.J. kick) – 42–28 SJ
- 05:22 COL – QUINNIE, Willie 4 yd pass from DUTTON, John (YAUSSI, Deric kick) – 42–35 SJ

4th Quarter:

- 08:33 SJ – HAGLUND, A.J. 19 yd field goal – 45–35 SJ
- 07:32 COL – QUINNIE, Willie 34 yd pass from DUTTON, John (YAUSSI, Deric kick) – 45–42 SJ
- 06:05 SJ – SAINTIL, Cleann 35 yd pass from GRIEB, Mark (HAGLUND, A.J. kick) – 52–42 SJ
- 01:59 SJ – ROE, James 9 yd pass from GRIEB, Mark (HAGLUND, A.J. kick) – 59–42 SJ
- Officials: Referee: Bill McCabe; Umpire: Mike Delaney; Linesman: Mike McCabe; Line judge: Dirk Bell; Back judge: Jimmy Buchanan
- Offensive Player of the Game: Mark Grieb (SJ)
- Defensive Player of the Game: Clevan Thomas (SJ)
- Ironman Player of the Game: Rodney Wright (SJ)

=== Week 14: at Los Angeles Avengers ===
Quarter	1	2	3	4	Total
SJ	14	10	14	28	66
LA	0	14	14	28	56

at Staples Center, Los Angeles, California

- Date: May 31
- Game time: 10:30 PM EST
- Game attendance: 15,174

Game information

1st Quarter:

- 11:08 SJ – James Roe 3 yd pass from Mark Grieb (A.J. Haglund kick) – 7–0 SJ
- 00:01 SJ – Rodney Wright 1 yd pass from Mark Grieb (A.J. Haglund kick) – 14–0 SJ

2nd Quarter:

- 09:49 LA – Michael Cobbins 1 yd run (Tyler Fredrickson kick) – 14–7 SJ
- 08:37 SJ – Cleannord Saintil 28 yd pass from Mark Grieb (A.J. Haglund kick) – 21–7 SJ
- 06:47 LA – LaShaun Ward 19 yd pass from Sonny Cumbie (Tyler Fredrickson kick) – 21–14 SJ
- 00:00 SJ – A.J. Haglund 34 yd field goal – 24–14 SJ

3rd Quarter:

- 11:51 LA – Timon Marshall 28 yd run (Tyler Fredrickson kick) – 24–21 SJ
- 08:49 SJ – Rodney Wright 10 yd pass from Mark Grieb (A.J. Haglund kick) – 31–21 SJ
- 07:31 LA – LaShaun Ward 35 yd pass from Sonny Cumbie (Tyler Fredrickson kick) – 31–28 SJ
- 03:46 SJ – Rodney Wright 6 yd pass from Mark Grieb (A.J. Haglund kick) – 38–28 SJ

4th Quarter:

- 14:56 LA – J.R. Tolver 2 yd run (Tyler Fredrickson kick) – 38–35 SJ
- 13:30 SJ – James Roe 6 yd pass from Mark Grieb (A.J. Haglund kick) – 45–35 SJ
- 05:46 SJ – Julius Gant 24 yd pass from Mark Grieb (A.J. Haglund kick) – 52–35 SJ
- 02:15 LA – Timon Marshall 13 yd pass from Sonny Cumbie (Tyler Fredrickson kick) – 52–42 SJ
- 01:07 SJ – Brian Johnson 1 yd run (A.J. Haglund kick) – 59–42 SJ
- 00:47 LA – Timon Marshall 16 yd pass from Sonny Cumbie (Tyler Fredrickson kick) – 59–49 SJ
- 00:20 SJ – Brian Johnson 6 yd run (A.J. Haglund kick) – 66–49 SJ
- 00:06 LA – LaShaun Ward 26 yd pass from Sonny Cumbie (Tyler Fredrickson kick) – 66–56 SJ
- Officials: Referee: Pat Garvey; Umpire: Paul King; Linesman: Bill Ward; Line judge: Bob McElwee; Back judge: James DeBell
- Offensive Player of the Game: Mark Grieb (SJ)
- Defensive Player of the Game: Ron Jones (SJ)
- Ironman Player of the Game: Jason Geathers (SJ)

=== Week 15 ===
Bye Week

=== Week 16: vs. Tampa Bay Storm ===
Quarter	1	2	3	4	Total
TB	14	21	7	28	70
SJ	7	31	14	21	73

at HP Pavilion at San Jose, San Jose, California

- Date: June 14
- Game time: 10:30 PM EST
- Game attendance: 14,042

Game information

1st Quarter:

- 13:50 TB – TIMMONS, Tyrone 13 yd pass from DIETZ, Brett (MARLER, Seth kick) – 7–0 TB
- 09:30 SJ – SAINTIL, Cleann 11 yd pass from GRIEB, Mark (HAGLUND, A.J. kick) – 7–7
- 02:31 TB – EDWARDS, Hank 21 yd pass from DIETZ, Brett (MARLER, Seth kick) – 14–7 TB

2nd Quarter:

- 12:48 SJ – ROE, James 3 yd pass from GRIEB, Mark (HAGLUND, A.J. kick) – 14–14
- 11:15 SJ – WATSON, Steve 0 yd fumble recovery (HAGLUND, A.J. kick) – 21–14 SJ
- 06:42 TB – EDWARDS, Hank 16 yd pass from DIETZ, Brett (MARLER, Seth kick) – 21–21
- 04:12 SJ – WRIGHT, Rodney 7 yd pass from GRIEB, Mark (HAGLUND, A.J. kick) – 28–21 SJ
- 01:01 TB – EDWARDS, Hank 9 yd pass from DIETZ, Brett (MARLER, Seth kick) – 28–28
- 00:40 SJ – ROE, James 12 yd pass from GRIEB, Mark (HAGLUND, A.J. kick) – 35–28 SJ
- 00:33 TB – EDWARDS, Hank 47 yd pass from DIETZ, Brett (MARLER, Seth kick) – 35–35
- 00:00 SJ – HAGLUND, A.J. 18 yd field goal – 38–35 SJ

3rd Quarter:

- 14:28 SJ – WRIGHT, Rodney 31 yd pass from GRIEB, Mark (HAGLUND, A.J. kick) – 45–35 SJ
- 06:47 TB – EDWARDS, Hank 14 yd pass from DIETZ, Brett (MARLER, Seth kick) – 45–42 SJ
- 00:42 SJ – SAINTIL, Cleann 4 yd pass from GRIEB, Mark (HAGLUND, A.J. kick) – 52–42 SJ

4th Quarter:

- 13:49 TB – TIMMONS, Tyrone 12 yd pass from DIETZ, Brett (MARLER, Seth kick) – 52–49 SJ
- 10:03 SJ – SAINTIL, Cleann 6 yd pass from GRIEB, Mark (HAGLUND, A.J. kick) – 59–49 SJ
- 07:35 SJ – SAINTIL, Cleann 6 yd pass from GRIEB, Mark (HAGLUND, A.J. kick) – 66–49 SJ
- 05:11 TB – SAMUELS, Lawren 7 yd pass from DIETZ, Brett (MARLER, Seth kick) – 66–56 SJ
- 04:23 SJ – ROE, James 7 yd pass from GRIEB, Mark (HAGLUND, A.J. kick) – 73–56 SJ
- 00:51 TB – SAMUELS, Lawren 4 yd pass from DIETZ, Brett (MARLER, Seth kick) – 73–63 SJ
- 00:07 TB – SAMUELS, Lawren 7 yd pass from DIETZ, Brett (MARLER, Seth kick) – 73–70 SJ
- Officials: Referee: Bill LeMonier; Umpire: Jeff Carr; Linesman: Greg Shields; Line judge: Dave Chesney; Back judge: Billy Beckett
- Offensive Player of the Game: Mark Grieb (SJ)
- Defensive Player of the Game: Clevan Thomas (SJ)
- Ironman Player of the Game: Lawrence Samuels (TB)

=== Week 17: vs. Georgia Force ===
Quarter	1	2	3	4	Total
GA	14	21	21	6	62
SJ	14	21	20	13	68

at HP Pavilion at San Jose, San Jose, California

- Date: June 21
- Game time: 10:30 PM EST
- Game attendance: 12,866

Game information

1st Quarter:

- 11:49 GA – JONES, Tiger 7 yd pass from GREISEN, Chris (MARTINEZ, Carlo kick failed) – 6–0 GA
- 10:04 SJ – SAINTIL, Cleann 15 yd pass from GRIEB, Mark (HAGLUND, A.J. kick) – 7–6 SJ
- 04:59 GA – HUEBNER, Matt 1 yd run (HUEBNER, Matt pass from MARTINEZ, Carlo) – 14–7 GA
- 00:51 SJ – SAINTIL, Cleann 4 yd pass from GRIEB, Mark (HAGLUND, A.J. kick) – 14–14

2nd Quarter:

- 14:19 GA – JONES, Tiger 30 yd pass from GREISEN, Chris (MARTINEZ, Carlo kick) – 21–14 GA
- 08:32 GA – MORRIS, Carl 13 yd pass from GREISEN, Chris (MARTINEZ, Carlo kick) – 28–14 GA
- 02:57 SJ – SAINTIL, Cleann 6 yd pass from GRIEB, Mark (HAGLUND, A.J. kick) – 28–21 SJ
- 00:41 SJ – THOMAS, Clevan 35 yd interception return (HAGLUND, A.J. kick) – 28–28
- 00:30 SJ – SAINTIL, Cleann 16 yd pass from GRIEB, Mark (HAGLUND, A.J. kick) – 35–28 SJ
- 00:17 GA – MORRIS, Carl 46 yd pass from GREISEN, Chris (MARTINEZ, Carlo kick) – 35–35

3rd Quarter:

- 14:28 SJ – WRIGHT, Rodney 39 yd pass from GRIEB, Mark (HAGLUND, A.J. kick) – 42–35 GA
- 12:05 GA – PAULEY, Charles 24 yd pass from GREISEN, Chris (MARTINEZ, Carlo kick) – 42–42
- 09:08 SJ – SAINTIL, Cleann 31 yd pass from GRIEB, Mark (HAGLUND, A.J. kick failed) – 48–42 SJ
- 06:47 GA – MORRIS, Carl 13 yd pass from GREISEN, Chris (MARTINEZ, Carlo kick) – 49–48 GA
- 04:48 SJ – JOHNSON, Brian 15 yd pass from GRIEB, Mark (HAGLUND, A.J. kick) – 55–49 SJ
- 02:48 GA – MORRIS, Carl 28 yd pass from GREISEN, Chris (MARTINEZ, Carlo kick) – 56–55 GA

4th Quarter:

- 13:00 SJ – SAINTIL, Cleann 13 yd pass from GRIEB, Mark (HAGLUND, A.J. kick failed) – 61–56 SJ
- 09:41 GA – JONES, Tiger 3 yd pass from GREISEN, Chris (MARTINEZ, Carlo kick failed) – 62–61 GA
- 05:35 SJ – SAINTIL, Cleann 11 yd pass from GRIEB, Mark (HAGLUND, A.J. kick) – 68–62 SJ
- Officials: Referee: Perry Havener; Umpire: Tom Laverty; Linesman: Kavin McGrath; Line judge: David Meslow; Back judge: Keith Washington
- Offensive Player of the Game: Mark Grieb (SJ)
- Defensive Player of the Game: Clevan Thomas (SJ)
- Ironman Player of the Game: Rodney Wright (SJ)

== Playoffs ==
=== American Conference Divisional: vs. (5) Colorado Crush ===
Quarter	1	2	3	4	Total
(5) COL	7	17	0	27	51
(2) SJ	13	20	3	28	64

at HP Pavilion at San Jose, San Jose, California

- Date: July 7
- Game time: 3:00 PM EST
- Game attendance: 12,479

Game information

1st Quarter:

- 10:23 SJ – James Roe 5 yd pass from Mark Grieb (A.J. Haglund kick failed) – 6–0 SJ
- 08:38 COL – Wendall Williams 34 yd pass from John Dutton (Deric Yaussi kick) – 7–6 COL
- 04:40 SJ – James Roe 5 yd pass from Mark Grieb (A.J. Haglund kick) – 13–7 SJ

2nd Quarter:

- 14:56 COL – Deric Yaussi 22 yd field goal COL 10 – SJS 13
- 11:07 SJ – Rodney Wright 45 yd pass from Mark Grieb (A.J. Haglund kick failed) – 19–10 SJ
- 08:39 COL – Ben Nelson 21 yd pass from John Dutton (Deric Yaussi kick) – 19–17 SJ
- 06:44 SJ – Rodney Wright 4 yd pass from Mark Grieb (A.J. Haglund kick) – 26–17 SJ
- 00:54 COL – Willie Quinnie 14 yd pass from John Dutton (Deric Yaussi kick) – 26–24 SJ
- 00:16 SJ – James Roe 8 yd pass from Mark Grieb (A.J. Haglund kick) – 33–24 SJ

3rd Quarter:

- 02:00 SJ – A.J. Haglund 37 yd field goal – 36–24 SJ

4th Quarter:

- 12:58 COL – Willie Quinnie 8 yd pass from John Dutton (Deric Yaussi kick blocked) – 36–30 SJ
- 10:34 SJ – Cleannord Saintil 11 yd pass from Mark Grieb (A.J. Haglund kick) – 43–30 SJ
- 06:55 SJ – Marquis Floyd 47 yd interception return (A.J. Haglund kick) – 50–30 SJ
- 03:57 COL – Ben Nelson 7 yd pass from John Dutton (Deric Yaussi kick) – 50–37 SJ
- 03:04 SJ – Cleannord Saintil 10 yd pass from Mark Grieb (A.J. Haglund kick) – 57–37 SJ
- 00:56 COL – Ben Nelson 5 yd pass from John Dutton (Deric Yaussi kick) – 57–44 SJ
- 00:51 SJ – Steve Watson 9 yd kickoff return (A.J. Haglund kick) – 64–44 SJ
- 00:23 COL – Ben Nelson 3 yd pass from John Dutton (Deric Yaussi kick) – 64–51 SJ
- Officials: Referee: Bill McCabe; Umpire: Rick Nelson; Linesman: Mike McCabe; Line judge: Brian Matthew; Back judge: Bud McCleskey
- Offensive Player of the Game: Mark Grieb (SJ)
- Defensive Player of the Game: Omarr Smith (SJ)
- Ironman Player of the Game: Rodney Wright (SJ)

=== American Conference Championship: vs. (6) Grand Rapids Rampage ===
Quarter	1	2	3	4	Total
(6) GR	7	7	14	27	55
(2) SJ	14	24	10	33	81

at HP Pavilion at San Jose, San Jose, California

- Date: July 12
- Game time: 3:30 PM EST
- Game attendance: 14,072

Game information

1st Quarter:

- 12:22 GR – SHELLEY, Jason 15 yd pass from MACPHERSON, Jam (GOWINS, Brian kick) – 7–0 GR
- 08:55 SJ – SAINTIL, Cleann 7 yd pass from GRIEB, Mark (HAGLUND, A.J. kick) – 7–7
- 02:27 SJ – GEATHERS, Jason 14 yd pass from GRIEB, Mark (HAGLUND, A.J. kick) – 14–7 SJ

2nd Quarter:

- 12:18 SJ – FREDERIC, Gene 3 yd pass from GRIEB, Mark (HAGLUND, A.J. kick) – 21–7 SJ
- 07:44 GR – MACPHERSON, Jam 3 yd run (GOWINS, Brian kick) – 21–14 SJ
- 05:59 SJ – SAINTIL, Cleann 16 yd pass from GRIEB, Mark (HAGLUND, A.J. kick) – 28–14 SJ
- 00:54 SJ – SAINTIL, Cleann 3 yd pass from GRIEB, Mark (HAGLUND, A.J. kick) – 35–14 SJ
- 00:00 SJ – HAGLUND, A.J. 32 yd field goal – 38–14 SJ

3rd Quarter:

- 14:45 GR – MARTIN, Chris 57 yd kickoff return (GOWINS, Brian kick) – 38–21 SJ
- 10:27 SJ – HAGLUND, A.J. 28 yd field goal – 41–21 SJ
- 08:05 GR – HIGGINS, Kenny 31 yd pass from MACPHERSON, Jam (GOWINS, Brian kick) – 41–28 SJ
- 03:27 SJ – SAINTIL, Cleann 17 yd pass from GRIEB, Mark (HAGLUND, A.J. kick) – 48–28 SJ

4th Quarter:

- 14:58 GR – HIGGINS, Kenny 9 yd pass from MACPHERSON, Jam (GOWINS, Brian kick) – 48–35 SJ
- 14:25 SJ – THOMAS, Clevan 5 yd kickoff return (HAGLUND, A.J. kick) – 55–35 SJ
- 10:12 GR – MACPHERSON, Jam 1 yd run (GOWINS, Brian kick) – 55–42 SJ
- 08:56 SJ – SAINTIL, Cleann 21 yd pass from GRIEB, Mark (HAGLUND, A.J. kick failed) – 61–42 SJ
- 05:51 GR – HIGGINS, Kenny 1 yd run (MACPHERSON, Jam pass intcpt) – 61–48 SJ
- 02:25 SJ – GEATHERS, Jason 9 yd pass from GRIEB, Mark (HAGLUND, A.J. kick) – 68–48 SJ
- 00:35 GR – MAGNER, Cole 3 yd pass from MACPHERSON, Jam (GOWINS, Brian kick) – 68–55 SJ
- 00:22 SJ – GEATHERS, Jason 14 yd run (HAGLUND, A.J. kick) – 75–55 SJ
- 00:00 SJ – GEATHERS, Jason 29 yd interception return (RISLOV, Scott rush failed) – 81–55 SJ
- Officials: Referee: Riley Johnson; Umpire: Rick Podraza; Linesman: Allen Baynes; Line judge: Dana McKenzie; Back judge: Jimmy Buchanan
- Offensive Player of the Game: Cleannord Saintil (SJ)
- Defensive Player of the Game: Omarr Smith (SJ)
- Ironman Player of the Game: Jason Geathers (SJ)

=== ArenaBowl XXII: vs. (1) Philadelphia Soul ===
Quarter	1	2	3	4	Total
(2) SJ	14	13	7	22	56
(1) PHI	14	23	9	13	59

at New Orleans Arena, New Orleans, Louisiana

- Date: July 27
- Game time: 3:00 PM EDT
- Game attendance: 17,244

Game information

1st Quarter:

- 11:21 SJO – Rodney Wright 8 yd pass from Mark Grieb (AJ Haglund kick)
- 09:30 PHI – Brent Holmes 34 yd pass from Matt D'Orazio (Connor Hughes kick)
- 05:30 SJO – Jason Geathers 5 yd pass from Mark Grieb (AJ Haglund kick)
- 02:59 PHI – Chris Jackson 34 yd pass from Matt D'Orazio (Connor Hughes kick)

2nd Quarter:

- 14:54 SJO – Jason Geathers 22 yd pass from Mark Grieb (AJ Haglund kick failed)
- 08:59 PHI – Chris Jackson 13 yd pass from Matt D'Orazio (Connor Hughes kick failed)
- 05:31 PHI – Larry Brackins 20 yd pass from Matt D'Orazio (Connor Hughes kick)
- 00:54 PHI – Matt D'Orazio 8 yd run (Connor Hughes kick)
- 00:29 SJO – Jason Geathers 23 yd pass from Mark Grieb (AJ Haglund kick)
- 00:00 PHI – Connor Hughes 20 yd field goal

3rd Quarter:

- 07:56 PHI – Chris Jackson 32 yd pass from Matt D'Orazio (Connor Hughes kick)
- 03:48 PHI – Raheem Orr safety
- 00:00 SJO – Jason Geathers 12 yd pass from Mark Grieb (AJ Haglund kick)

4th Quarter:

- 06:49 PHI – Larry Brackins 7 yd pass from Matt D'Orazio (Connor Hughes kick failed)
- 02:13 SJO – Brian Johnson 3 yd pass from Mark Grieb (Cleannord Saintil pass from Mark Grieb)
- 00:39 PHI – Phil Bogle 2 yd pass from Matt D'Orazio (Connor Hughes kick)
- 00:28 SJO – Rodney Wright 26 yd pass from Mark Grieb (Jason Geathers rush failed)
- 00:17 SJO – Jason Geathers 14 yd pass from Mark Grieb (Jason Geathers rush)
- Officials: Referee: Bill LaMonnier; Umpire: Paul King; Linesman: Bill Ward; Line Judge: R.G. Detiller; Back Judge: James Cole; Alternate: Riley Johnson
- Offensive Player of the Game: Chris Jackson (PHI)
- Defensive Player of the Game: Gabe Nyienhuis (PHI)
- Ironman Player of the Game: Mike Brown (PHI)
- Mitsubishi Motors Arenabowl XXII MVP: Matt D'Orazio (PHI)
