= Rodney Wright =

American football player (born 1979)

Profile
- Position: Wide receiver

Personal information
- Born: November 28, 1979 (age 46); Bakersfield, California, U.S.
- Listed height: 5 ft 9 in (1.75 m)
- Listed weight: 181 lb (82 kg)

Career information
- High school: Bakersfield (CA)
- College: Fresno State
- NFL draft: 2002: 7th round, 250th overall pick

Career history
- Buffalo Bills (2002–2003)*; San Jose SaberCats (2005–2008); Kansas City Chiefs (2009)*; San Francisco 49ers (2009)*; San Jose SaberCats (2011); Tulsa Talons (2011); San Jose SaberCats (2011–2012); Chicago Rush (2013); Pittsburgh Power (2014)
- * Offseason or practice squad member only

Awards and highlights
- ArenaBowl champion (2007); First-team All-WAC (1999); Second-team All-WAC (2001)

Career AFL statistics
- Receptions: 445
- Receiving yards: 4,860
- Receiving TDs: 69
- Return yards: 4,052
- Return TDs: 10
- Stats at ArenaFan.com

Rodney Bernard Wright, Jr. (born November 28, 1979) is an American former professional football wide receiver. He was selected by the Buffalo Bills in the seventh round of the 2002 NFL draft. He played college football at Fresno State.

Wright was also a member of the San Jose SaberCats, Kansas City Chiefs, San Francisco 49ers, Tulsa Talons, Chicago Rush and Pittsburgh Power.

== Early life ==
Wright attended Bakersfield High School, where he also lettered in basketball and baseball. He was a First-team All-Area selection by the Bakersfield Californian as a senior after scoring 14 touchdowns. He was also named the Southeast Yosemite League's Offensive Player of the Year and the Bakersfield Californian Player of the Year. He helped lead Kern County with 58 receptions for 883 yards and 14 touchdowns to help his team to an 11-1 record.

== College career ==
Wright attended Fresno State, where he was teammates with future first overall selection quarterback David Carr. During his four seasons at Fresno State, Wright was regarded as one of the most explosive players in the Western Athletic Conference (WAC). Along with playing wide receiver, he also returned kickoffs and punts, and rushed the ball on sweeps and reverses.

In 1998 as a true freshman, Wright played in four games, including a start on the road against Utah, in which he recorded six receptions for 116 yards, 19.3 yards per catch. He recorded three receptions for 68 yards and two touchdowns against BYU. He missed the final five games of the season due to an injury.

As a sophomore, in 1999, Wright was a First-team All-WAC selection, after recording 74 receptions for 1,062 yards, which both rank fourth-best in school history, and seven touchdowns, 11 carries for 70 yards. For most of the season he was nationally ranked in kickoff returns with 27 for 584 yards. He ranked 30th in the NCAA in all-purpose yards, with 135.33, and receptions, with 5.67, and 31st in receiving yards, with 83.92, per game. He also recorded his season-long reception with an 83-yard touchdown against SMU. He also had a career-high seven receptions for 156 yards against UTEP. He also had three 100-yard games.

As a junior in 2000, recorded 38 receptions, second on the team, for 466 yards, with a season-long of 51 yards, and two touchdowns.

Wright played in seven games, with six starts. He was forced too sit out from October 14 – November 11 with a strained calf. He ranked near the top of the WAC in receiving yards and receptions per game before the injury. He returned to play against SMU, however it was for just one play. However, he would return to full strength in time to play against San Jose State, recording three receptions for 92 yards, including a season-long 51-yard reception. He also had a solid performance in the Silicon Valley Football Classic recording five receptions for 77 yards. He also had a strong performance in Fresno States win over Cal, recording 13 receptions for 174 yards and both of Fresno State's touchdowns.

As a senior in 2001, Wright played in all 14 regular season games, starting 11, and recording 104 receptions for 1,630 yards and 12 touchdowns. He became just the second receiver in school history to record 1,000 receiving yards in a season twice in their career, the other being Larry Willis whom achieved the feat in both 1983 and 1984. Wright also set a school single-season records for most receptions and yards. He had five 100-yard receiving games, including four in a row at one point. He was also a Second-team All-WAC selection.

Wright had one of the best performances in bowl game history against Michigan State in the Silicon Valley Football Classic, in which he recorded 13 receptions for 299 yards and two touchdowns, including one of 79 yards. He scored a rushing touchdown against Tulsa, giving him a touchdown as, a receiver, rusher, on a blocked punt, and passed for a touchdown, in his career. He had one of the best single-game performances in school history against Boise State, recording 14 receptions for 179 yards and a touchdown. He recorded 182 yards and two touchdowns in a win over Oregon State. He also recorded two touchdowns against Rice and SMU. He returned a blocked punt for a touchdown against Utah State, the second one in his career.

In his career, Wright started 19 of 38 career games he played in. He also ended his career as the schools career leader in receptions with 222. He is also second on the school's career list in receiving yards. He also set school single-season records with 104 receptions and 1,630 yards as a senior. He is also one-of-two receivers in school history to record 1,000 receiving yards in a season twice. For his career, Wright has 222 receptions, 3,274 receiving yards, 23 receiving touchdowns, 42 carries for 245 rushing yards, and one rushing touchdown. He also recorded, for his career 40 kick returns for 863 yards.

== Professional career ==
=== Buffalo Bills ===
Wright was selected in the seventh round (249th overall) of the 2002 NFL draft by the Buffalo Bills, using one of four seventh round draft choices they had that year. He spent most of the 2002 and 2003 seasons on the teams practice squad.

=== San Jose SaberCats (first stint) ===
After not being able to make it onto an active roster in the National Football League, Wright signed with the San Jose SaberCats of the Arena Football League on November 3, 2004.

In 2005, Wright played in 12 games as a rookie. He finished the season third on the team in receptions with 59, receiving yards with 678, touchdowns with eight, and all-purpose yards with 1,293. He was also the team's second leading kickoff returner with 22 returns for 476 yards, along with two missed field goal attempts returned for 94 yards, including a 54-yard touchdown return, the sixth missed field goal attempt return touchdown in franchise history. He finished second on the team with 48.5 tackles (42 solo) along with two fumble recoveries. He was named the league's Ironman of the Week in back-to-back weeks (Weeks 12 and 13), becoming the first player in franchise history to win the award in consecutive weeks. He was also named the league's Ironman of the Month for April 2005. He was also named the team Ironman and Rookie of the Year by his teammates.

Wright made his AFL debut as a starting Offensive Specialist (OS) recording two rushing touchdowns on the road against the Tampa Bay Storm on January 30. He recorded his first career touchdown reception and his first career fumble recovery against the Grand Rapids Rampage on March 18. He started at WR / DB and played the entire second half recording a career-high two touchdown reception on the road against the Chicago Rush. He was named Ironman of the Game for the first time in his career after recording 227 all-purpose yards and 8.5 tackles against the Dallas Desperados. He was also the Ironman of the Game second consecutive week after recording his first career interception, pass break up and seven tackles and three receptions for 81 yards, including a career-long 45-yard touchdown, and returned a missed field goal attempt 54-yards for a touchdown, which was the franchise's first missed field goal attempt return touchdown since 2002. He also had a career-high 10 receptions for 134 receiving yards and a touchdown and recorded 247 all-purpose yards against the Nashville Kats. He also made nine receptions, including one touchdown, in his first career playoff game, a road game against the Colorado Crush.

In 2006, Wright only played in two games. He was scheduled to be the starting Offensive Specialist but injured his foot early in the season opening game against the Utah Blaze. He was placed on Injured reserve on February 3, and missed the next eight games. In week nine, he played for first time since opening night, playing against the Arizona Rattlers and recorded three kickoff returns for 51 yards, two receptions for 22 yards and 2.5 tackles with a pass broken up, before re-injuring his foot in the same game. He was placed back on injured reserve on April 6, and missed rest of the season and the playoffs.

In 2007, Wright returned from an injury-shortened season, and had his best all-round season as a wide receiver and as a kick returner starting all 11 games he played in. He missed five games while on injured reserve with a hamstring injury. He finished as the team's third leading receiver with a career-high 98 receptions for 1,076 yards. He finished second in the league in kickoff return average with 23.2 and tied for fifth in kickoff return touchdowns, with three. He tied a team single-game record with two kickoff return touchdowns and became the first player to take consecutive kickoff returns for touchdowns. He led the team with 1,794 all-purpose yards. He recorded his 150th career reception and passed 1,500 career receiving yards.

Wright also had a career-high five rushing attempts for eight yards and two touchdowns, he caught seven passes for 53 yards and a touchdown and had 79 yards on three kickoff returns with two special teams tackles in his first game since April 2, 2006 at the Los Angeles Avengers. He recorded a career-high 13 receptions for 119 yards and his 10th career touchdown reception on the road against Chicago. He returned a kickoff 54-yards for his first career kickoff return touchdown and recorded a career-high 259 all-purpose yards on the road against the Georgia Force. He passed the 1,000 career receiving yard mark and recorded his 100th career reception while reaching the 2,000 career all-purpose yard mark against the Storm. He recorded 10 reception for 116 yards and a touchdown with two solo special teams tackles to earn Ironman of the Game against the Crush. He recorded 12 receptions for 130 yards, his fifth straight 100-yard game, but was recorded just two kickoff returns after injuring his hamstring in New Orleans. He returned to the field and recorded nine receptions for 113 yards, his sixth straight 100-yard game and eighth career, in Nashville. He reached the 1,500 career receiving yards mark against the Orlando Predators. He also recorded the 150th reception of his career against the Rattlers. He also tied a team record with two kickoff return touchdowns, and the first to return consecutive kickoff returns for touchdowns, while recording 203 all-purpose yards with one solo special teams tackle to earn Ironman of the Game on the road against the Las Vegas Gladiators. He was also a starter in all three playoff games. He was the league's playoff leader with 523 all-purpose yards. He recorded 145 yards on five kickoff returns and 227 all-purpose yards, the fourth highest team playoff total, against the Crush. He also had a playoff career single-game high and team ArenaBowl record 10 receptions in an ArenaBowl XXI win over the Columbus Destroyers. After the season, on November 16, 2007, he re-signed with the SaberCats.

Wright entered the 2008 season ranked 10th in career receptions, receiving yards and touchdown receptions. He played in 13 games on the season and finished with career highs in receptions with 124, receiving yards with 1,453 and receiving touchdowns with 24, having played in only 13 games. He also carried the ball seven times for 13 yards and one touchdown. He also recorded three tackles, and 58 kick returns for 1,186 yards and one touchdown.

Wright had a season-high 14 receptions for 165 yards, scored his only rushing touchdown of the season, a nine-yard carry, in Week 5 against the Kansas City Brigade. He also had a season-high four receiving touchdowns Week 11 against the Rattlers, and a season-high two carries for three yards against the Avengers in Week 14. In the playoffs, he recorded 28 receptions for 330 yards and four touchdowns, while carrying the ball once for minus one yard. In the SaberCats ArenaBowl XXII loss to the Philadelphia Soul, he recorded a playoff single-game high 13 receptions for 144 yards and two touchdowns. His 13 catches was also an ArenaBowl record.

=== Kansas City Chiefs ===
Wright signed with the Kansas City Chiefs on April 7, 2009. He was waived on September 5 and signed to the practice squad. He was then released on September 16.

=== San Francisco 49ers ===
Wright was signed to the San Francisco 49ers practice squad on December 1, 2009.

=== San Jose SaberCats (second stint) ===
Wright was re-signed by the SaberCats on February 18, 2011. He was released on March 28, 2011. In three games with the SaberCats, he had 38 catches for 399 yards and 3 touchdowns.

=== Tulsa Talons ===
On March 29, 2011, the Talons signed Wright. He spent his entire tenure with the Talons on the Refuse to Report list.

=== San Jose SaberCats (third stint) ===
Wright was traded back to the SaberCats on May 11, 2011. He was placed on Injured Reserve on May 25 and then League Suspension on July 15. He was re-signed on June 21, 2012. He played in two games, recording 9 receptions for 91 yards and 1 touchdown.

=== Chicago Rush ===
The Rush signed Wright on February 12, 2013. He played in 8 games, catching 48 passes for 552 yards and 11 touchdowns.

=== Pittsburgh Power ===
The Power was assigned Wright on April 16, 2014. The Power folded in November 2014.

== Personal life ==
Wright is the father of college wideouts Rodney Wright III (Fresno State) and Jalen McMillan (Washington).

== See also ==
- List of NCAA major college football yearly receiving leaders
