= George Williams III =

American football player (born 1975)

No. 96, 97
- Position: Defensive lineman

Personal information
- Born: December 8, 1975 (age 50); Roseboro, North Carolina, U.S.
- Listed height: 6 ft 4 in (1.93 m)
- Listed weight: 330 lb (150 kg)

Career information
- High school: Lakewood (NC)
- College: NC State
- NFL draft: 1998: undrafted

Career history
- New York Giants (1998–2000); San Jose SaberCats (2002–2008)

Awards and highlights
- 3× ArenaBowl champion (2002, 2004, 2007)

Career NFL statistics
- Tackles: 9
- Fumble recoveries: 1
- Passes defended: 1
- Stats at Pro Football Reference

Career AFL statistics
- Tackles: 78
- Sacks: 8
- Forced Fumbles: 3
- Fumble recoveries: 5
- Interceptions: 2
- Stats at ArenaFan.com

George Roger Williams III (born December 8, 1975) is an American former professional football player who was a defensive lineman for three seasons with the New York Giants of the National Football League (NFL). He played college football for the NC State Wolfpack. Williams also played professionally for seven seasons with the San Jose SaberCats of the Arena Football League (AFL).

Williams was born in Roseboro, North Carolina. He attended nearby Lakewood High School, where he played football; he continued to play football at North Carolina State University. Williams played for a total of four years at NC State; while he was not selected in the NFL draft, he was ultimately signed by the New York Giants. Williams spent a total of three years with the Giants. While he never started a game for the team, he received substantial playing time; he appeared in 29 of the Giants' 32 regular season games in 1999 and 2000. Williams was on the team's roster when they advanced to Super Bowl XXXV, where they lost to the Baltimore Ravens by the lopsided score of 34–7. Following the loss, Williams was released from the team.

Williams ultimately signed with the San Jose SaberCats in May 2002. He was a key component of the SaberCats' mid-2000s run of success; over the seven years of his AFL career, the SaberCats reached four ArenaBowls (winning three). Williams was used mainly as a defensive lineman; at times, however, he was also used as a wide receiver. In 2007, his most productive year as a wide receiver, he caught five passes for 16 yards; all five catches, however, were for touchdowns. Williams' AFL career concluded with the SaberCats' loss to the Philadelphia Soul in ArenaBowl XXII. He finished his career with 78 tackles, 8 sacks, and 2 interceptions.
