= Matt Kinsinger =

American football player (born 1977)

No. 38, 25, 21
- Position: Fullback/Linebacker

Personal information
- Born: March 16, 1977 (age 49)
- Listed height: 6 ft 2 in (1.88 m)
- Listed weight: 265 lb (120 kg)

Career information
- College: Slippery Rock (1995–1998)
- NFL draft: 1999: undrafted

Career history
- Augusta Stallions (2000); Houston ThunderBears (2001); San Jose SaberCats (2002–2005); Las Vegas Gladiators (2006); San Jose SaberCats (2007); Chicago Rush (2008)

Awards and highlights
- 3× ArenaBowl champion (2002, 2004, 2007)
- Stats at ArenaFan.com

Matthew Mark Kinsinger (born March 16, 1977) is an American former professional football fullback/linebacker who played in the Arena Football League for the Houston ThunderBears, San Jose SaberCats, Las Vegas Gladiators, and Chicago Rush.

== Early life ==
While attending Meyersdale High School in Meyersdale, Pennsylvania, Kinsinger was a first team All-County and an All-Conference selection in football, basketball, and baseball.

== College career ==
Kinsinger attended Slippery Rock University, where he played as a defensive lineman. He was a Football Gazette All-America selection.
