= William Obeng =

American football player (born 1983)

Profile
- Position: Offensive lineman

Personal information
- Born: April 14, 1983 (age 43); Accra, Ghana
- Listed height: 6 ft 7 in (2.01 m)
- Listed weight: 340 lb (154 kg)

Career information
- College: San Jose State
- NFL draft: 2005: undrafted

Career history
- Minnesota Vikings (2005)*; Oakland Raiders (2005–2006)*; San Jose SaberCats (2007–2008); Arizona Rattlers (2010)*; Alabama Vipers (2010)*
- * Offseason or practice squad member only

Awards and highlights
- ArenaBowl champion (2007)

Career AFL statistics
- Receptions: 1
- Receiving yards: 12
- Tackles: 2
- Stats at ArenaFan.com

William Yaw Obeng (born April 14, 1983) is a Ghanaian former American football offensive lineman in the Arena Football League. He was signed by the Minnesota Vikings as an undrafted free agent in 2005. He played college football at San Jose State.

Obeng was also a member of the Oakland Raiders, San Jose SaberCats, Arizona Rattlers, and Alabama Vipers.

Before San Jose State, Obeng attended Mesabi Range Community and Technical College.
