= Cleannord Saintil =

American gridiron football player (born 1984)

Profile
- Position: Wide receiver

Personal information
- Born: February 11, 1984 (age 42); Naples, Florida, U.S.
- Listed height: 6 ft 0 in (1.83 m)
- Listed weight: 190 lb (86 kg)

Career information
- High school: Naples
- College: Mid Tenn State
- NFL draft: 2006: undrafted

Career history
- San Jose SaberCats (2007–2008); Toronto Argonauts (2009)*; Arizona Rattlers (2010)*; Tampa Bay Storm (2010); Florida Tarpons (2013)
- * Offseason or practice squad member only

Awards and highlights
- ArenaBowl champion (2007); UIFL champion (2013); First-team All-Sun Belt (2005)

Career AFL statistics
- Receptions: 151
- Receiving yards: 1,876
- Receiving TDs: 47
- Rushing TDs: 4
- Stats at ArenaFan.com

Cleannord Saintil (born February 11, 1984) is an American former professional football wide receiver. He was originally signed by the San Jose SaberCats of the Arena Football League as an undrafted free agent in 2007. He played college football for the Middle Tennessee State Blue Raiders.

== Early life ==
Saintil was born in Naples, Florida. He played high school football at Naples High School and in his senior year led his team to the Florida 5A championship being named to both first-team all-state and all-county honors. In addition, he earned all-county honors for his basketball play and won the Florida Pop Warner football championship with his Naples Gators team when he was 14 years old.

== College career ==
Saintil first attended Ranger College, a community college in Texas, in 2002, where he totalled 12 touchdowns and 964 yards on 43 catches, enough to earn Junior College All-American accolades. In 2003, he attended Highland Community College (Illinois) and earned All-Jayhawk Conference First-Team honors as a receiver and kick return specialist with 38 catches for 624 yards and 9 touchdowns, leading the conference in receptions and receiving yards per game.

He then went on to play two seasons of college football for the Middle Tennessee State University Blue Raiders from 2004 to 2005. In his first season there, he ranked third on the team with 40 receptions and scored a rushing touchdown as well as returning 11 kickoffs. In his final season, he made 11 starts and earned First Team All-Sun Belt Conference honors by leading the conference with 66 catches — the fifth-highest season total at MidTenn State. He also gained 379 yards on 17 kickoff returns.

== Professional career ==
Saintil went undrafted in the 2006 NFL draft and instead signed with the San Jose SaberCats of the Arena Football League. He played in five games in his rookie year, starting the season on the injury reserve list. Nonetheless, he was able to contribute with 7 touchdowns and 181 yards on 16 receptions and 8.5 tackles. He was the SaberCats leading receiver in the 2008 season when he caught 120 passes for 1,503 yards and 35 touchdowns. He also returned 9 kicks for 129 yards and, in the playoffs, caught 24 passes for 248 yards for 7 touchdowns. He dressed for the ArenaBowl XXII loss to the Philadelphia Soul.

On March 9, 2009, Saintil signed as a free agent with the Toronto Argonauts of the Canadian Football League but was released at the end of training camp.
