= Dan Loney =

American football player (born 1977)

No. 91
- Position: Offensive lineman

Personal information
- Born: December 7, 1977 (age 48); Atascadero, California, U.S.
- Listed height: 6 ft 1 in (1.85 m)
- Listed weight: 280 lb (127 kg)

Career information
- High school: Atascadero
- College: Cal Poly
- NFL draft: 2000: undrafted

Career history
- San Jose SaberCats (2002–2008); Oklahoma City Yard Dawgz (2010); San Jose SaberCats (2011)

Awards and highlights
- 3× ArenaBowl champion (2002, 2004, 2007)

Career AFL statistics
- Receptions: 1
- Receiving yards: 0
- Receiving TDs: 1
- Tackles: 31
- Stats at ArenaFan.com

Dan Loney (born December 7, 1977) is an American former professional football offensive lineman who played in the Arena Football League (AFL). Loney attended Atascadero High School in Atascadero, California, where he played competitive football; he continued to play football at Cal Poly, starting for the Mustangs in the late 1990s and blocking for teammates including Kamil Loud, Antonio Warren, and Alli Abrew, among others. Upon graduating, he was not selected in the 2000 NFL draft; as such, he signed with the San Jose SaberCats in early 2001.

Loney spent one year on the SaberCats' practice squad. In 2002, he was promoted to the team's active roster; from 2002 to 2008, he was used primarily as an offensive lineman (though he did see limited action as a defensive lineman). During his time with the SaberCats, Loney appeared in four ArenaBowls (XVI, XVIII, XXI, and XXII); the SaberCats won the first three contests, giving Loney three AFL championships in six years. Following the SaberCats' loss to the Philadelphia Soul in ArenaBowl XXII, the league suspended operations; this ended Loney's first stint with the SaberCats.

After one year, the AFL resumed operations in 2010. The SaberCats, however, did not rejoin the league; as such, Loney spent the season with the Oklahoma City Yard Dawgz. In 2011, the SaberCats finally rejoined the league; Loney rejoined the team for what was to be his final AFL season. He retired following the SaberCats' campaign.
