= Chuck Reed (gridiron football) =

American football player (born 1970)

No. 10
- Position: Offensive lineman

Personal information
- Born: December 21, 1970 (age 55); Shreveport, Louisiana, U.S.
- Listed height: 6 ft 2 in (1.88 m)
- Listed weight: 305 lb (138 kg)

Career information
- College: UNLV
- NFL draft: 1993: undrafted

Career history
- Shreveport Pirates (1994–1995); Anaheim Piranhas (1996–1997); Portland Forest Dragons (1998–1999); Oklahoma Wranglers (2000–2001); San Jose SaberCats (2002–2007)

Awards and highlights
- 3× ArenaBowl champion (2002, 2004, 2007)

Career AFL statistics
- Tackles: 110.5
- Sacks: 14
- Receptions: 9
- Receiving yards: 85
- Receiving TDs: 2
- Stats at ArenaFan.com

Lorenzo "Chuck" Reed (born December 21, 1970) is an American former professional football offensive lineman who played in the Arena Football League (AFL) with the Anaheim Piranhas, Portland Forest Dragons, Oklahoma Wranglers, and San Jose SaberCats. Prior to his AFL career, he played for the Shreveport Pirates of the Canadian Football League (CFL). Reed played college football at UNLV.

Reed joined the SaberCats in 2002. He played mainly as an offensive lineman, though he also saw significant amount of playing time on the team's defensive line. He played in (and won) two ArenaBowls with the SaberCats in 2002 and 2004, respectively. Reed's active playing career ended following the SaberCats' 2005 campaign; he remained, however, on the team's injured reserve through 2007. He won his third (and final) championship that year when the SaberCats defeated the Columbus Destroyers in ArenaBowl XXI.
