= Julius Gant =

American football player (born 1982)

No. 93
- Position: Lineman

Personal information
- Born: January 14, 1982 (age 44); Atlanta, Georgia, U.S.
- Listed height: 6 ft 4 in (1.93 m)
- Listed weight: 330 lb (150 kg)

Career information
- High school: Maynard H. Jackson (Atlanta)
- College: Middle Tennessee State
- NFL draft: 2005: undrafted

Career history
- San Jose SaberCats (2006–2008); New Orleans VooDoo (2011)

Awards and highlights
- ArenaBowl champion (2007)

Career AFL statistics
- Tackles: 7.5
- Receptions–Yards: 4–43
- Touchdowns: 3
- Stats at ArenaFan.com

Julius Gant (born January 14, 1982) is an American former professional football lineman who played in the Arena Football League (AFL). Gant attended Maynard H. Jackson High School, where he excelled as an offensive lineman; following his departure from the school, he played football at Middle Tennessee State University. At Middle Tennessee State, Gant served primarily as a right tackle; in 2003, his best season, he started eleven games for the team.

Gant was not selected in the 2005 NFL draft. He ultimately signed with the San Jose SaberCats of the AFL; he remained a member of the team for three years. Gant logged minutes as both an offensive lineman and defensive lineman with the team; on the whole, however, he was used mainly in a reserve capacity. On occasion, the SaberCats utilized Gant as a wide receiver; he caught a total of four passes (with three resulting in touchdowns) while with the team.

Gant won his first (and only) AFL Championship when the SaberCats defeated the Columbus Destroyers in ArenaBowl XXI. Following his stint with the SaberCats, he joined the AFL's New Orleans VooDoo; his AFL career ended when the VooDoo released him on April 8, 2011.
