= Lance Frazier =

American football player (born 1981)

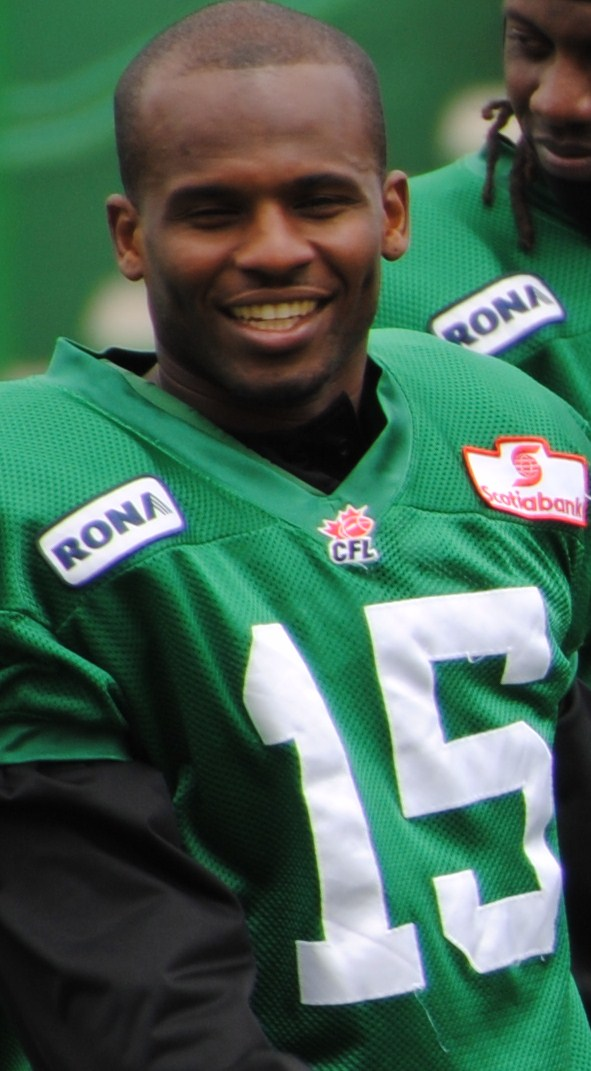
- Frazier with the Saskatchewan Roughriders in 2010

No. 30, 15
- Position: Cornerback

Personal information
- Born: May 23, 1981 (age 45); Delray Beach, Florida, U.S.
- Listed height: 5 ft 10 in (1.78 m)
- Listed weight: 183 lb (83 kg)

Career information
- High school: Spanish River (Boca Raton, Florida)
- College: West Virginia
- NFL draft: 2004: undrafted

Career history
- Baltimore Ravens (2004)*; Dallas Cowboys (2004–2005); Tampa Bay Storm (2006)*; Seattle Seahawks (2006)*; → Cologne Centurions (2006); Saskatchewan Roughriders (2006–2012)
- * Offseason or practice squad member only

Awards and highlights
- CFL West All-Star (2009); Grey Cup champion (2007)

Career NFL statistics
- Tackles: 45
- Interceptions: 2
- Fumble recoveries: 2
- Stats at Pro Football Reference

Career CFL statistics
- Games played: 73
- Tackles: 159
- Interceptions: 15
- Fumble recoveries: 4
- Sacks: 1

Elance Antonio Frazier (born May 23, 1981) is an American former professional football player who was a cornerback in the National Football League (NFL) for the Baltimore Ravens and Dallas Cowboys. He also was a member of the Saskatchewan Roughriders in the Canadian Football League (CFL) and the Cologne Centurions in NFL Europe. He played college football for the West Virginia Mountaineers.

== Early life ==
Frazier attended Spanish River High School in Boca Raton, Florida. He was a three-year starter at wingback and cornerback. He also practiced track.

As a sophomore in 1997, he helped the Sharks make their first playoff appearance in school history, while sharing the offensive backfield with Jason Geathers, who would go on to play professional football in the Arena Football League.

As a senior, he was a part of a backfield that included future professional football players Jason Geathers and LaDaris Vann. He received All-county, All-area and PrepStar All-region honors. He finished his high school career with 1,550 rushing yards, 15 rushing touchdowns, 26 receptions for 700 yards, 100 tackles and 10 interceptions.

== College career ==
Frazier accepted a football scholarship from the West Virginia University. As a redshirt freshman, he had 27 tackles, 2 interceptions and 9 passes defensed. As a sophomore, he was a part of the starting rotation at right cornerback, making 49 tackles (one for loss), 7 passes defensed, 3 forced fumbles and one sack.

As a junior, he was named the regular starter at right cornerback, recording 49 tackles (2 for loss), 8 passes defensed and received the Whitney Gwynne Award from coaching staff for his unsung contributions. As a senior, he was named one of the team captains, registering 61 tackles (5 for loss), 13 passes defensed, 5 interceptions, 4 forced fumbles, 2 fumble recoveries, 12 punt returns for 282 yards (school record 23.5 yards average) and one touchdown.

In his college career he recorded 186 tackles, 7 interceptions, 37 passes defensed (second in school history), 7 forced fumbles, 2 fumble recoveries and returned 42 punts for 490 yards. He was a member of the Athletic Director's Academic Honor Roll and graduated with a degree in Physical Education specializing in athletic coaching.

== Professional career ==
=== Baltimore Ravens ===
Frazier was signed as an undrafted free agent by the Baltimore Ravens after the 2004 NFL draft on April 30. On September 5, he was released and signed to the practice squad the next day.

=== Dallas Cowboys ===
On October 12, 2004, he was signed by the Dallas Cowboys from the Ravens' practice squad, to provide depth for cornerbacks injuries. He became the fifth different player to start at right cornerback, starting eight of the final nine games after Tyrone Williams was placed on the injured reserve list. He recorded 38 tackles, two interceptions and one fumble recovery. His 9.5-yard punt return average ranked fifth in the National Football Conference (NFC) and first among NFC rookies. On August 26, 2005, he was waived with a sprained ankle.

=== Tampa Bay Storm ===
On October 26, 2005, Frazier signed a one-year contract with the Tampa Bay Storm of the Arena Football League. On January 10, 2006, he was placed on non-claimable waivers. He never played a regular season game with the Storm.

=== Seattle Seahawks ===
In 2006, he was signed to a futures contract by the Seattle Seahawks. He was allocated to the Cologne Centurions of NFL Europe, where he was named a starter at cornerback, while making 27 tackles, one interception and 6 passes defensed. He was released on August 28.

=== New Orleans VooDoo ===
On October 6, 2006, Frazier was traded from the Tampa Bay Storm to the New Orleans VooDoo. The VooDoo placed Frazier on the Exempted list, due to his playing in the Canadian Football League. On November 9, 2007, he was traded to the Philadelphia Soul in exchange for offensive lineman Kelvin Chaisson, never playing a game with the VooDoo.

=== Saskatchewan Roughriders ===
In October 2006, Frazier signed with the Saskatchewan Roughriders of the Canadian Football League (CFL). He played in one game, making two tackles.

In 2007, he recorded 24 tackles, one interception for three yards, and one fumble recovery for 31 yards. He started 12 games at defensive halfback, including both playoff games and the Grey Cup championship. He spent 9 games on the injured reserve list.

In 2008, he started 17 regular season games, recording 37 tackles, 5 interceptions (led the team), 2 special teams tackles and one fumble recovery.

In 2009, he was re-signed before Frazier entered free agency. He started 15 regular season games (missed 2 games with injury), the playoffs and the Grey Cup game at defensive halfback. He tallied 38 tackles, 5 interceptions (led the team), one fumble recovery and was named a CFL West Division All-star.

In 2010, he started 18 regular season games, the playoffs and the Grey Cup game as a defensive halfback. He posted 34 tackles, 4 interceptions, one sack, one pass defensed and one special teams tackle. In 2011, he was limited to 13 games because of a hamstring injury. On June 24, 2012, Frazier was released after six seasons with the Roughriders.

== Personal life ==
Frazier is an athletic director administrative assistant for Kennett High School in Kennett Square, Pennsylvania. In 2018, he was named as the head football coach. In his first season, he led the Blue Demons to their first playoff berth in school history. After leading the Blue Demons to a 9–1 regular season record and the first two playoff wins in school history, he was named the 2019–20 Pennsylvania Football Coach of the Year by the National Federation of High Schools.
