= Jason Geathers =

American gridiron football player (born 1980)

No. 3
- Position: Wide receiver/Linebacker

Personal information
- Born: September 8, 1980 (age 46); Delray Beach, Florida, U.S.
- Listed height: 6 ft 3 in (1.91 m)
- Listed weight: 215 lb (98 kg)

Career information
- High school: Spanish River (Boca Raton, Florida)
- College: Miami (FL)
- NFL draft: 2004: undrafted

Career history
- Cleveland Browns (2004)*; New York Giants (2004–2005)*; San Jose SaberCats (2006–2008); Saskatchewan Roughriders (2009)*; Alabama Vipers (2010)*; Tampa Bay Storm (2010); Arizona Rattlers (2011); Georgia Force (2012)*; San Jose SaberCats (2012); Arizona Rattlers (2012); Orlando Predators (2013); Arizona Rattlers (2014)
- * Offseason or practice squad member only

Awards and highlights
- 3× ArenaBowl champion (2007, 2012, 2014); 2× AFL All-Ironman Team (2007, 2008); BCS national champion (2001)

Career AFL statistics
- Receptions: 315
- Yards: 3,379
- Touchdowns: 63
- Tackles: 73
- Interceptions: 2
- Stats at ArenaFan.com

Jason Geathers (born September 8, 1980) is an American former football wide receiver in the Arena Football League (AFL) for the San Jose SaberCats, Tampa Bay Storm, Arizona Rattlers and Orlando Predators. He was also a member of the New York Giants in the National Football League (NFL). He played college football at the University of Miami.

== Early life ==
Geathers attended Spanish River Community High School. In football, he played as a running back, quarterback, wide receiver, linebacker and returner. As a junior, he was a part of a backfield that included future professional football players Lance Frazier and Ladaris Vann.

As a senior, he recorded 1,612 total offensive yards, rushing 105 times for 846 yards and 8 touchdowns, making 15 receptions for 328 yards and 5 scores, while also completing 20 passes for 438 yards and 4 touchdowns. He finished his high school football career after posting over 5,000 yards of total offense, 57 touchdowns (48 rushing, 8 receiving, 1 fumble recovery) and passing for 11 touchdowns.

As a senior, he also averaged 15.5 points per game in basketball and set personal bests in track of 10.7 seconds in the 100-meters and 22.4 seconds in the 200-meters.

Geathers was considered an elite football recruit, receiving honors as Parade All-American, Palm Beach Post All-Area first-team, USA Today Honorable Mention All-American, ranked No. 5 overall by The Sporting News, ranked No. 8 on SuperPrep National 50 and No. 3 Florida, PrepStar Dream Team Top 100, selected to the Super 30 All-SEC Region by PrepStar, ranked No. 8 on the Sun-Sentinel national top 50, named Florida's #1 Tailback on Florida Times-Union Super 75, ranked No. 6 on Tampa Tribune national top 100, ranked No. 3 on Tampa Tribune Florida top 50, selected to the USA Today Super 25 preseason team, SuperPrep Preseason Elite 50 pick, Gridiron Greats Preseason Top 100 and National Recruiting Advisor Preseason Top 100 pick.

== College career ==
Geathers accepted a football scholarship from the University of Miami. As a freshman, he appeared in 9 games as a backup running back and wide receiver. He also played on the special teams unit. He rushed for 122 yards on 18 carries. Against Rutgers University, he had 7 carries for 73 yards and one touchdown.

As a sophomore, he appeared in 10 games as a backup wide receiver, making 9 receptions for 112 yards and one touchdown. He made his first catch in the season opener against Penn State University. He scored his first receiving touchdown against the University of Washington. He made a key downfield block on a touchdown run by running back Clinton Portis, in the second quarter of the 2002 Rose Bowl 37-14 victory over Nebraska, contributing to the team winning the BCS National Championship.

As a junior, he began the season as a backup tailback, before being moved back to wide receiver in the last 2 games, following an injury to Kevin Beard. He posted 398 yards on 68 carries (5.9-yard avg.), 3 rushing touchdowns, 7 receptions for 99 yards and 2 receiving touchdowns. In the season opener against Florida A&M University, he rushed for 199 yards (sixth all-time in school history) on 22 carries, scored 2 touchdowns and had a career-long run of 62 yards. Against the University of Connecticut, he gained 86 yards on 9 carries. Against the University of Florida, he tallied 165 all-purpose yards, rushing for 72 yards on 13 carries, catching two passes for 37 yards (both for touchdowns) and 56 return yards on three kickoff returns. He caught the winning touchdown in the 28-27 victory against Florida State University.

As a senior, he suffered a hamstring injury that forced him to miss all of the preseason. He began the regular season as a backup wide receiver, before being moved to running back. He registered 35 carries for 151 yards (4.3-yard avg.), one rushing touchdown, 23 receptions for 277 yards and 3 receiving touchdowns.

== Professional career ==
Geathers was signed by the Cleveland Browns as an undrafted free agent after the 2004 NFL draft on April 30. He was waived on August 31. On October 13, he was signed to the New York Giants' practice squad. He was released on April 26, 2005.

On December 14, 2005, he was signed as a free agent by the San Jose SaberCats of the Arena Football League. In 2008, he registered 37 receptions for 365 yards, 5 touchdowns, 22 tackles, 4 fumble recoveries, 3 pass breakups and 2 forced fumbles. Against the New Orleans VooDoo, he had 18 receptions for 188 yards and 2 touchdowns.

In June 2009, he was signed by the Saskatchewan Roughriders of the Canadian Football League. He was released on September 8. On May 6, 2010, he was signed as a free agent by the Tampa Bay Storm. On February 26, 2013, he signed with the Orlando Predators.
