= Ronald Jones (defensive lineman) =

American gridiron football player (born 1981)

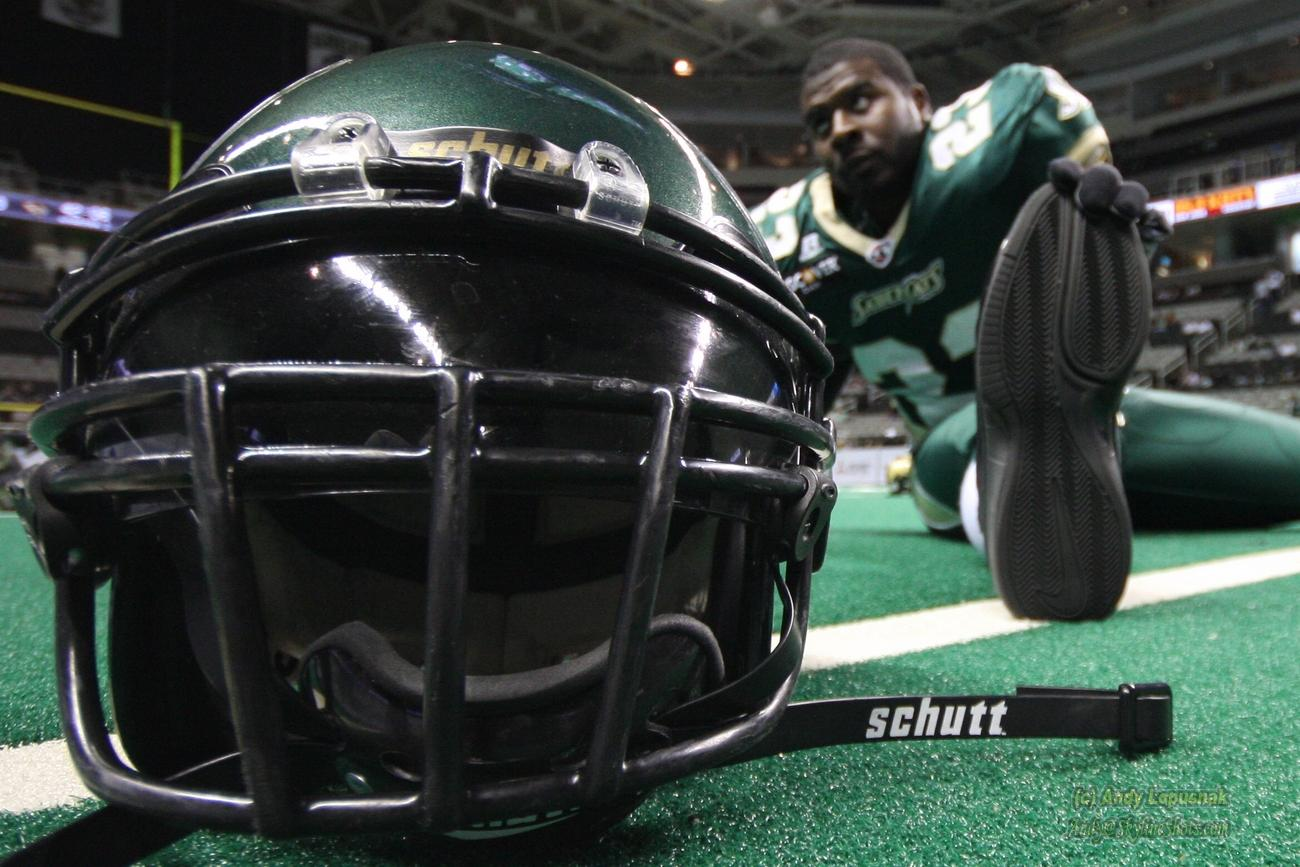
- Jones with the San Jose SaberCats in 2008

No. 56
- Position: Offensive lineman/Defensive lineman

Personal information
- Born: September 17, 1981 (age 45); Gulfport, Mississippi, U.S.
- Listed height: 6 ft 3 in (1.91 m)
- Listed weight: 280 lb (127 kg)

Career information
- High school: Gulfport (MS)
- College: Southern Miss
- NFL draft: 2004: undrafted

Career history
- San Francisco 49ers (2004)*; Indianapolis Colts (2004)*; Nashville Kats (2005–2006); San Jose SaberCats (2007–2008); Toronto Argonauts (2009)*; Arizona Rattlers (2010–2012)
- * Offseason or practice squad member only

Awards and highlights
- 2× ArenaBowl champion (2007, 2012); Second-team All-Arena (2007)
- Stats at CFL.ca (archive)
- Stats at ArenaFan.com

Ronald Jones (born September 17, 1981) is an American former professional football offensive lineman and defensive lineman. He was signed as an undrafted free agent by the San Francisco 49ers in 2004. He played college football at Southern Miss.

Jones was also a member of the Indianapolis Colts, Nashville Kats, San Jose SaberCats, Toronto Argonauts, and Arizona Rattlers.
