= Phil Glover =

American football player (born 1975)

No. 31, 51, 54
- Position: Fullback / Linebacker

Personal information
- Born: December 17, 1975 (age 50); Las Vegas, Nevada, U.S.
- Listed height: 6 ft 0 in (1.83 m)
- Listed weight: 265 lb (120 kg)

Career information
- High school: Clark (Las Vegas)
- College: Utah
- NFL draft: 1999: 7th round, 222nd overall pick

Career history
- Tennessee Titans (1999); Scottish Claymores (2000); Indianapolis Colts (2000); Toronto Phantoms (2002); Las Vegas Gladiators (2004); Arizona Rattlers (2004–2005); San Jose SaberCats (2006–2008); Tampa Bay Storm (2008)

Awards and highlights
- ArenaBowl champion (2007)

Career NFL statistics
- Games played: 10
- Stats at Pro Football Reference

Career AFL statistics
- Carries: 140
- Rushing yards: 327
- Rushing TDs: 34
- Tackles: 92
- Sacks: 15.5
- Stats at ArenaFan.com

Phil Dwyain Glover (born December 17, 1975) is an American former professional football player who was a linebacker in the National Football League (NFL). He played college football for the Utah Utes and was selected by the Tennessee Titans in the seventh round of the 1999 NFL draft.

== Early life ==
Glover attended Clark High School in Las Vegas, Nevada, and was a student and a letterman in football and wrestling. In football, he was a two-time All-Conference selection and a two-time All-State selection, and as a senior, he led his team to a Nevada state title and was named the Nevada Player of the Year. In wrestling, he was a four-year letterman and as a senior, he won a state championship in the 171-pound division.

== College career ==
Glover played college football at Washington State University and the University of Utah.

== Professional career ==
=== National Football League (NFL) ===
Glover was selected in the seventh round (222nd overall) of the 1999 NFL draft. He spent 1999 with the Tennessee Titans. He was then allocated to the Scottish Claymores of NFL Europe in 2000 and then spent time with the Indianapolis Colts.

=== Arena Football League (AFL) ===
Glover was out of football in 2001, however he signed with the Toronto Phantoms of the Arena Football League in 2002. He then was out of football again in 2003, and then signed with the Las Vegas Gladiators in 2004. He spent part of the season with Las Vegas, he then spent the rest of the season and the 2005 season with the Arizona Rattlers. He played for the San Jose SaberCats for two and a half seasons from 2006 to midway through 2008 when he was traded to the Tampa Bay Storm.
