= Trestin George =

American football player and actor (born 1983)

No. 4, 8
- Position: Defensive back

Personal information
- Born: August 24, 1983 (age 43); Pasadena, California, U.S.
- Listed height: 5 ft 9 in (1.75 m)
- Listed weight: 179 lb (81 kg)

Career information
- High school: Saint Mary's College (Berkeley, California)
- College: San Jose State
- NFL draft: 2006: undrafted

Career history
- Jacksonville Jaguars (2006)*; San Jose SaberCats (2007–2008); BC Lions (2009–2010); San Jose SaberCats (2011)
- * Offseason or practice squad member only

Awards and highlights
- ArenaBowl champion (2007)

Career AFL statistics
- Tackles: 33
- Interceptions: 2
- Kickoff returns: 92
- Kickoff return yards: 1,921
- Kickoff return TDs: 2
- Stats at ArenaFan.com
- Stats at CFL.ca (archive)

Trestin George (born August 24, 1983) is an American actor and former professional football defensive back. He played for the BC Lions of the Canadian Football League until he requested his release to be closer to his family. He was signed as an undrafted free agent by the Jacksonville Jaguars in 2006. He played college football for the San Jose State Spartans.

== Acting career ==
While a rookie for the Jacksonville Jaguars, a film company called Spring Street Studios filmed a documentary on George's life entitled the Trestin George Story.

In 2012, George joined the SAG-AFTRA union, and George made his major film debut in the movie Fruitvale Station.
