= Brian Johnson (fullback) =

American football player (born 1979)

No. 75, 45, 27
- Position: Fullback

Personal information
- Born: April 6, 1979 (age 47); Phoenix, Arizona, U.S.
- Listed height: 6 ft 2 in (1.88 m)
- Listed weight: 280 lb (127 kg)

Career information
- High school: Highlands Ranch (Highlands Ranch, Colorado)
- College: New Mexico (1997–2001)

Career history
- San Jose SaberCats (2003–2008); San Francisco 49ers (2004)*; → Berlin Thunder (2005)
- * Offseason or practice squad member only

Awards and highlights
- 2× ArenaBowl champion (2004, 2007); Second-team All-Arena (2008); 2× First-team All-MW (2000, 2001)

Career AFL statistics
- Tackles: 41.5
- Rushing yards: 300
- Rushing TDs: 32
- Receiving TDs: 2
- Return TDs: 2
- Stats at ArenaFan.com

Brian Allen "Horse" Johnson (born April 6, 1979) is an American former professional football fullback who played five seasons with the San Jose SaberCats of the Arena Football League (AFL). He played college football at the University of New Mexico.

== Early life ==
Brian Allen Johnson was born on April 6, 1979, in Phoenix, Arizona. He attended Highlands Ranch High School in Highlands Ranch, Colorado.

== College career ==
Johnson played college football for the New Mexico Lobos. He redshirted in 1997 and was a four-year letterman from 1998 to 2001. He was a three-year starter for the Lobos. He was also a two-time first-team All-Mountain West Conference defensive lineman selection.

== Professional career ==
Johnson signed with the San Jose SaberCats of the AFL on November 16, 2002. He played for the SaberCats from 2003 to 2008, earning Second-team All-Arena honors.

He was signed by the San Francisco 49ers of the National Football League (NFL) on August 18, 2004. Johnson was allocated to NFL Europe to play for the Berlin Thunder on February 7, 2005. After having ankle surgery in August 2005, he was declared out for the 2005 season. He was released by the 49ers on August 29, 2005.
