= Jeff Littlejohn =

American football player (born 1983)

No. 92
- Position: Defensive lineman

Personal information
- Born: February 14, 1983 (age 43); Gaffney, South Carolina, U.S.
- Listed height: 6 ft 2 in (1.88 m)
- Listed weight: 315 lb (143 kg)

Career information
- High school: Gaffney
- College: Middle Tennessee State
- NFL draft: 2006: undrafted

Career history
- San Jose SaberCats (2007); Jacksonville Sharks (2010); Georgia Force (2011–2012); Jacksonville Sharks (2012)

Awards and highlights
- ArenaBowl champion (2007); Sun Belt Defensive Player of the Year (2005); First-team All-Sun Belt (2005)

Career AFL statistics
- Tackles: 48
- Sacks: 10.5
- Forced fumbles: 2
- Fumble recoveries: 6
- Stats at ArenaFan.com

Jeff Littlejohn (born February 14, 1983) is an American former professional football defensive lineman who played in the Arena Football League (AFL) for the San Jose SaberCats, Jacksonville Sharks and Georgia Force.

Littlejohn played football at Middle Tennessee State University through the year 2005. He was not selected in the 2006 NFL draft; as such, he signed with the San Jose SaberCats of the Arena Football League in November 2006. Littlejohn saw little action as a rookie; despite this, he won his first championship when the SaberCats defeated the Columbus Destroyers in ArenaBowl XXI.

Littlejohn did not record any statistics in 2008. In 2009, the Arena Football League ceased operations; when it returned in 2010, Littlejohn signed with the expansion Jacksonville Sharks. Littlejohn saw significant playing time in 2010; he responded by recording five sacks and three fumble recoveries in 13 regular season games. In 2011, he joined the AFL's Georgia Force; there, he tallied four sacks and one fumble recovery in 12 regular season games. Littlejohn remained with the Force into 2012; halfway through the season, however, he was placed on reassignment by the team. Littlejohn was then assigned to the Sharks, where he finished the season.
