= Garrett McIntyre =

American football player (born 1984)

No. 50
- Position: Linebacker

Personal information
- Born: November 26, 1984 (age 41); South Lake Tahoe, California, U.S.
- Listed height: 6 ft 3 in (1.91 m)
- Listed weight: 255 lb (116 kg)

Career information
- High school: South Tahoe
- College: Fresno State
- NFL draft: 2006: undrafted

Career history
- Seattle Seahawks (2006)*; Arizona Cardinals (2006)*; Tennessee Titans (2006)*; San Jose SaberCats (2007–2009); Hamilton Tiger-Cats (2009–2010); New York Jets (2011–2013)
- * Offseason or practice squad member only

Awards and highlights
- ArenaBowl champion (2007); WAC Defensive Player of the Year (2005)

Career NFL statistics
- Total tackles: 72
- Sacks: 5.5
- Forced fumbles: 2
- Stats at Pro Football Reference
- Stats at ArenaFan.com

Garrett Robert McIntyre (born November 26, 1984) is an American former professional football player who was a linebacker in the National Football League (NFL). He played college football for the Fresno State Bulldogs and was signed as an undrafted free agent by the Seattle Seahawks in 2006.

He was also a member of the Arizona Cardinals, Tennessee Titans, San Jose SaberCats, Hamilton Tiger-Cats, and New York Jets.

== Professional career ==
=== Seattle Seahawks ===
After going undrafted in the 2006 NFL draft, McIntyre signed with the Seattle Seahawks as an undrafted free agent on May 1, 2006. He was cut on June 2, 2006.

=== Arizona Cardinals ===
McIntyre was signed by the Arizona Cardinals on August 15, 2006. He was waived a week later on August 21.

=== Tennessee Titans ===
He was claimed off waivers by the Tennessee Titans on August 22, 2006. He was cut on September 5, 2006.

=== San Jose SaberCats ===
McIntyre signed with the San Jose SaberCats of the Arena Football League on February 4, 2007. He was placed on injured reserved on April 20, 2007. He appeared in games for the team from 2008 to 2009.

=== Hamilton Tiger-Cats ===
McIntyre played for the Hamilton Tiger-Cats of the Canadian Football League from 2009 to 2010.

=== New York Jets ===
McIntyre was signed by the New York Jets to a future contract on January 26, 2011.

McIntyre made his NFL debut on special teams for the Jets, in their season opener against the Dallas Cowboys at home. In the fourth quarter, he can be seen blocking two Dallas lineman at once, opening a path for running back Joe McKnight to block a punt, which was returned for a touchdown. This event shifted the momentum in the Jets' favor, and led them to a comeback victory. McIntyre started the first game of his career against the Denver Broncos on November 17, 2011.

McIntyre was released on August 30, 2014.
