= Darren Arbet =

American football player and coach (born 1962)

Nashville Kats
- Title: Head coach

Personal information
- Born: Birmingham, Alabama, U.S.
- Listed height: 6 ft 1 in (1.85 m)
- Listed weight: 230 lb (104 kg)

Career information
- Position: Fullback/Linebacker
- High school: Edison (Stockton, California)
- College: Sacramento State
- NFL draft: 1986: undrafted

Career history

Playing
- Los Angeles Cobras (1988)*; Maryland Commandos (1989)
- * Offseason or practice squad member only

Coaching
- Sacramento State (1990) Tight ends coach; Albany Firebirds (1992–1994) Fullback/linebackers coach; Albany Firebirds(1995–1998) Defensive coordinator; San Jose SaberCats (1999–2015) Head coach; Pittsburgh Steelers (2003) Internship player personnel; Atlanta Falcons (2004) Internship special teams/linebackers; Humboldt State (2016) Assistant head coach, linebackers coach, and special teams coordinator; Cabrillo (2017–2020) Head coach; Bay Area Panthers (2023) General manager and head coach; Nashville Kats (2025–present) Head coach

Awards and highlights
- 4× ArenaBowl champion (2002, 2004, 2007, 2015); Arena Crown champion (2026); 2× AFL Coach of the Year (2000, 2002); Arena Football Hall of Fame (2011)

Career AFL statistics
- Rush attempts: 2
- Yards: 8
- Tackles: 0.5
- Sacks: 1
- Stats at ArenaFan.com

Head coaching record
- Regular season: 169–73 (.698)
- Postseason: 19–9 (.679)
- Career: 188–82 (.696)

Darren Arbet (born November 26, 1962) is an American football coach who is the head coach of the Nashville Kats of Arena Football One. He was the head coach of the San Jose SaberCats of the Arena Football League (AFL) from 1999 to 2015 and had a record of 169–73, including four titles: ArenaBowl XVI, ArenaBowl XVIII, ArenaBowl XXI, and ArenaBowl XXVIII.

== Early life ==
Arbet attended Edison High School in Stockton, California, where he was a standout in football and track & field.

== College career ==
Arbet played four seasons for the Sacramento State Hornets football team from 1981 to 1985 as a defensive end.

== Professional career ==
=== Los Angeles Cobras ===
Arbet joined the Los Angeles Cobras in 1988.

=== Maryland Commandos ===
Arbet played for the Maryland Commandos in 1989.

== Coaching career ==
=== Sacramento State ===
Arbet coached tight ends at his alma mater in 1990.

=== Albany Firebirds ===
Arbet received a job coaching fullbacks and linebackers for the Albany Firebirds in 1992. When defensive coordinator Doug Kay received the offer to coach the Charlotte Rage in 1995, Arbet was promoted to defensive coordinator by the Firebirds.

=== San Jose SaberCats ===
On January 13, 1999, the San Jose SaberCats named Arbet their second head coach in franchise history. He won four ArenaBowls with the SaberCats. He also served as general manager, and later bought a stake in the team. His tenure ended when the SaberCats pulled out of the AFL shortly after winning their fourth ArenaBowl.

=== Humboldt State University ===
Arbet became the Assistant Head Coach, linebackers coach, and special teams coordinator for the Humboldt State Lumberjacks in 2016.

=== Cabrillo College ===
Arbet was the head football coach at Cabrillo College from 2017–2020.

=== Bay Area Panthers ===
General Manager and Head Coach 2023

=== AFL head coaching record ===
Team	Year	Regular season				Postseason			
Team	Year	Won	Lost	Win %	Finish	Won	Lost	Win %	Result
SJ	1999	6	8	.429	3rd in AC West	–	–	–	–
SJ	2000	12	2	.857	1st in AC Western	1	1	.500	Lost to Nashville Kats in Semifinals
SJ	2001	10	4	.714	1st in AC Western	1	1	.500	Lost to Nashville Kats in Semifinals
SJ	2002	13	1	.929	1st in AC Western	3	0	1.000	Defeated Arizona Rattlers to win ArenaBowl XVI
SJ	2003	12	4	.750	1st in AC Western	1	1	.500	Lost to Arizona Rattlers in Semifinals
SJ	2004	11	5	.688	2nd in AC Western	3	0	1.000	Defeated Arizona Rattlers to win ArenaBowl XVIII
SJ	2005	9	7	.563	2nd in AC Western	0	1	.000	Lost to Colorado Crush in First Round
SJ	2006	10	6	.625	1st in AC Western	1	1	.500	Lost to Chicago Rush in Semifinals
SJ	2007	13	3	.813	1st in AC Western	3	0	1.000	Defeated Columbus Destroyers to win ArenaBowl XXI
SJ	2008	11	5	.688	1st in AC Western	2	1	.667	Lost to Philadelphia Soul in ArenaBowl XXII
SJ	2011	7	11	.389	4th in NC West	–	–	–	–
SJ	2012	12	6	.667	2nd in NC West	0	1	.000	Lost to Arizona Rattlers in First Round
SJ	2013	13	5	.722	3rd in NC West	0	1	.000	Lost to Arizona Rattlers in First Round
SJ	2014	13	5	.722	1st in NC Pacific	1	1	.500	Lost to Arizona Rattlers in Semifinals
SJ	2015	17	1	.944	1st in NC Pacific	3	0	1.000	Defeated Jacksonville Sharks to win ArenaBowl XXVIII
Total		169	73	.698		19	9	.679	

== Personal life ==
In 2002, Arbet became the first African-American head coach to win a pro-football championship when he coached the SaberCats to a victory at ArenaBowl XVI. His nephew is former AFL player Kevin Arbet.
