= ArenaBowl XXII =

Arena Football League championship game

San Jose SaberCats (American)	Philadelphia Soul (National)
56	59
	1	2	3	4	Total
SJ	14	13	7	22	56
PHI	14	23	9	13	59
- Date: July 27, 2008
- Stadium: New Orleans Arena; New Orleans, Louisiana
- MVP: Matt D'Orazio, QB, Philadelphia: Chris Jackson, WR, Philadelphia (Offensive Player of the Game); Gabe Nyenhuis, DL, Philadelphia (Defensive Player of the Game); Mike Brown, WR/DB, Philadelphia (Ironman of the Game)
- Referee: Bill LeMonnier
- Attendance: 17,244
- Winning coach: Bret Munsey
- Losing coach: Darren Arbet

TV in the United States
- Network: ABC
- Announcers: Bob Wischusen, Ray Bentley, Stan Verrett and Marcellus Wiley
- Nielsen ratings: 0.9

ArenaBowl XXII was played on July 27, 2008, at New Orleans Arena in New Orleans, Louisiana (the host of ArenaBowl XXI). It was the 22nd and final championship game in the history of the original Arena Football League. This was the fourth neutral site ArenaBowl in AFL history and the second ArenaBowl in the state of Louisiana. It was the last ArenaBowl before the AFL's economic suspension, until 2010 when the AFL was reformed, continuing on with ArenaBowl XXIII.

== Background ==
The game was played between the American Conference Champions San Jose SaberCats, who were making their fourth, and second consecutive, appearance in the title game (they have won in all of their previous trips), against the National Conference Champions Philadelphia Soul, who were making their first appearance in the franchise's history in the ArenaBowl.

=== Philadelphia Soul ===
Week	Date	Opponent	Home/Away	Result
1	March 1	Orlando Predators	Home	W 77-56
2	March 9	Chicago Rush	Away	W 60-49
3	March 16	New York Dragons	Home	W 63-42
4	March 20	Los Angeles Avengers	Away	W 71-34
5	March 29	Tampa Bay Storm	Home	W 59-51
6	April 5	Utah Blaze	Home	W 64-56
7	April 12	San Jose SaberCats	Away	W 58-57
8	April 21	Columbus Destroyers	Away	W 76-55
9	April 28	Dallas Desperados	Home	W 57-28
10	May 2	Cleveland Gladiators	Away	L 55-67
11	May 12	Georgia Force	Away	L 62-63
12	May 17	Columbus Destroyers	Home	W 51-43
13	May 22	Kansas City Brigade	Home	L 47-54
14		Bye	Week	
15	June 7	Dallas Desperados	Away	W 71-64
16	June 14	Cleveland Gladiators	Home	W 62-61
17	June 22	New York Dragons	Away	W 59-30

The Soul, along with division rival Dallas, were undefeated at week 9. They proceeded to beat them in that week, however when travelling to Cleveland for the following game, they lost their first game of the season. They continued to sputter, dropping two of their last three, however these ultimately were their only three losses on the season. They were the top seed in their conference, clinching home field advantage throughout the playoffs until the actual ArenaBowl.

=== San Jose SaberCats ===
Week	Date	Opponent	Home/Away	Result
1	March 3	Chicago Rush	Away	L 47-70
2	March 10	Grand Rapids Rampage	Away	W 66-58
3	March 15	Arizona Rattlers	Home	W 63-43
4	March 22	Dallas Desperados	Home	L 56-59
5	March 29	Kansas City Brigade	Away	W 44-36
6	April 5	New Orleans VooDoo	Away	L 43-72
7	April 12	Philadelphia Soul	Home	L 57-58
8	April 18	Utah Blaze	Away	W 61-40
9	April 26	Los Angeles Avengers	Home	W 70-42
10	May 3	Orlando Predators	Away	L 35-61
11	May 9	Arizona Rattlers	Away	W 63-42
12	May 17	Utah Blaze	Home	W 74-64
13	May 24	Colorado Crush	Home	W 59-42
14	May 31	Los Angeles Avengers	Away	W 66-56
15		Bye	Week	
16	June 14	Tampa Bay Storm	Home	W 73-70
17	June 21	Georgia Force	Home	W 68-62

The SaberCats finished the season with a record of 11-5, yet, unlike the Soul, were not undefeated for one week of the season, due to their loss in week one to the Chicago Rush. However, after losing four of their first seven games, and five out of their first ten, they continued on to finish with six consecutive wins to have a total of eleven during the season. They finished well enough to have the second best record in the conference, and best in their division. They were the number two seed in the playoffs.

=== Playoffs ===
One odd fact noted throughout the playoffs was that both lowest seeded teams making the playoffs won in the first round.

In the playoffs, the Soul first beat the sixth-seeded New York Dragons 48-49 in the Divisional round of the tournament on a controversial call. The Soul appeared to have scored the game-winning touchdown as time expires. The play was reviewed, and even though the replays seemed to indicate a knee down before the ball crossed the goal line, the score was confirmed and the Soul won the game. In the Eastern Conference Championship they proceeded to beat the fourth-seeded Cleveland Gladiators by a score of 35-70.

The SaberCats had a similar playoff schedule. They also had a first-round bye but unlike the Soul, failed to gain home field advantage throughout the playoffs. They beat the fifth-seeded Colorado Crush (51-64) in the Divisional round and the sixth-seeded Grand Rapids Rampage (55-81), who previously beat top-seeded Chicago Rush, in the Western Conference Championship.

== Game summary ==
The SaberCats received the opening kickoff, and teams exchanged touchdowns through the first quarter, tying the game three times.

It was 20-20 when the Soul took control. Philadelphia scored three unanswered touchdowns in the second quarter to go up 34-20 and led 37-27 at halftime. In the second half, Philadelphia scored on its opening drive and added a safety to up its lead to 46-27.

San Jose responded to close the game to 46-34 on a 12-yard touchdown pass from Mark Grieb to Jason Geathers. But the Soul was able to match each SaberCat score. With 39 seconds left in the game, a two-yard touchdown pass from Matt D'Orazio to Phil Bogle gave the Soul a seemingly comfortable 59-42 lead. San Jose scored in 11 seconds and recovered an onside kick, and scored again with just 17 second left.

Suddenly it was 59-56, but the Soul recovered the ensuing onside kick and was finally able to run out the clock.

Philadelphia defeated San Jose 59-56, and Soul quarterback Matt D'Orazio was named the Mitsubishi Motors ArenaBowl XXII MVP.

D'Orazio was 26 for 43 for 302 yards, seven touchdowns and no interceptions. His leading receiver was Chris Jackson with 11 catches for 146 yards and three scores.

Grieb finished with 299 passing yards, eight touchdowns and one interception. Rodney Wright caught 13 passes for 144 yards and two scores. Geathers had five touchdowns and 101 receiving yards.
