= 2008 Arena Football League season =

- League: Arena Football League
- Sport: Arena football
- Duration: February 29, 2008 – July 27, 2008

Regular season
- Season champions: Philadelphia Soul
- Season MVP: Matt D'Orazio, PHI

AFL playoffs
- National Conference champions: Philadelphia Soul
- National Conference runners-up: Cleveland Gladiators
- American Conference champions: San Jose SaberCats
- American Conference runners-up: Grand Rapids Rampage

ArenaBowl XXII
- Champions: Philadelphia Soul
- Runners-up: San Jose SaberCats
- Finals MVP: Matt D'Orazio, PHI

AFL seasons
- ← 2007 2010 →

National: Eastern, Southern
American: Western, Central

The 2008 Arena Football League season was the 22nd season of the Arena Football League and final season before the 2009 season cancellation and subsequent bankruptcy of the original AFL corporate entity. The regular season began play on February 29, 2008 and concluded on June 22. The playoffs began the following week, and ArenaBowl XXII was held in New Orleans, Louisiana on July 27 between the National Conference champion Philadelphia Soul and the American Conference champion San Jose SaberCats. This game was won by the Soul, 59–56.

Prior to the season, it was announced that the Austin Wranglers would move to the af2, and the Nashville Kats folded, thus leaving the league with 17 teams. The Las Vegas Gladiators relocated to Cleveland.

== Standings ==
National Conference
Eastern Division
Team	W	L	PCT	PF	PA	DIV	CONF	Home	Away
Philadelphia Soul^{(1)}	13	3	.813	992	810	7–1	9–2	7–1	6–2
Dallas Desperados^{(3)}	12	4	.750	861	798	6–2	9–2	6–2	6–2
Cleveland Gladiators^{(4)}	9	7	.563	901	895	4–4	5–6	6–2	3–5
New York Dragons^{(6)}	8	8	.500	822	819	2–6	4–7	5–3	3–5
Columbus Destroyers	3	13	.188	750	893	1–7	2–10	2–6	1–7
Southern Division
Team	W	L	PCT	PF	PA	DIV	CONF	Home	Away
Georgia Force^{(2)}	10	6	.625	927	848	3–3	6–4	6–2	4–4
Orlando Predators^{(5)}	9	7	.563	881	898	3–3	4–6	5–3	4–4
New Orleans VooDoo	8	8	.500	893	835	2–4	4–6	6–2	2–6
Tampa Bay Storm	8	8	.500	903	876	4–2	5–5	5–3	3–5

American Conference
Central Division
Team	W	L	PCT	PF	PA	DIV	CONF	Home	Away
Chicago Rush^{(1)}	11	5	.688	926	765	6–0	9–1	6–2	5–3
Colorado Crush^{(5)}	6	10	.375	847	909	2–4	4–6	4–4	2–6
Grand Rapids Rampage^{(6)}	6	10	.375	952	968	3–3	4–6	3–5	3–5
Kansas City Brigade	3	13	.188	752	923	1–5	1–9	2–6	1–7
Western Division
Team	W	L	PCT	PF	PA	DIV	CONF	Home	Away
San Jose SaberCats^{(2)}	11	5	.688	945	875	6–0	9–1	6–2	5–3
Arizona Rattlers^{(3)}	8	8	.500	842	907	1–5	3–7	3–5	5–3
Utah Blaze^{(4)}	6	10	.375	941	959	2–4	6–4	4–4	2–6
Los Angeles Avengers	5	11	.313	847	1004	3–3	4–6	4–4	1–7

- Clinched playoff berth
- Clinched division
- Clinched division and have conference's best record

Source: ArenaFan.com

== Playoffs ==
Wild Card Playoffs	Divisional Playoffs
4	Cleveland	73
2	Georgia	70
4	Cleveland	69
5	Orlando	66
National Conference
3	Dallas	63
6	New York	77
6	New York	48
1	Philadelphia	49
6	Grand Rapids	58
1	Chicago	41
3	Arizona	41
6	Grand Rapids	48
American Conference
4	Utah	44
5	Colorado	49
5	Colorado	51
2	San Jose	64

Conference Championships
4	Cleveland	35
1	Philadelphia	70
6	Grand Rapids	55
2	San Jose	81

ArenaBowl XXII
N1	Philadelphia	59
A2	San Jose	56

== Regular season statistics ==
=== Passing ===
Player	Comp.	Att.	Comp%	Yards	TD's	INT's	Rating
Matt D'Orazio, PHI	301	416	72.4%	3,331	72	4	131.3
Raymond Philyaw, CLE	357	514	69.5%	4,320	83	10	126.5
Joe Germaine, UTA	411	605	67.9%	4,869	97	13	122.9
Russ Michna, CHI	239	351	68.1%	2,721	57	7	122.4
Chris Greisen, GEO	399	585	65.9%	4,956	97	17	121.7

=== Rushing ===
Player	Car.	Yards	Avg.	TD's
Marlion Jackson, CLE	105	353	3.2	23
Josh White, DAL	88	265	3.0	8
Dawan Moss, KC	86	244	2.8	10
Dan Alexander, CHI	70	241	3.4	12
Harold Wells, CLB	103	224	2.2	17

=== Receiving ===
Player	Rec.	Yards	Avg.	TD's
Derek Lee, CLB	142	1,762	12.4	32
Chris Jackson, PHI	140	1,692	12.1	49
T.T. Toliver, ORL	118	1,645	13.9	31
Jason Willis, NY	136	1,555	11.4	30
Huey Whittaker, UTA	126	1,547	12.3	32

== All-Arena team ==
Offense
Position	First team	Second team
Quarterback	Matt D'Orazio, Philadelphia	Joe Germaine, Utah
Fullback	Marlion Jackson, Cleveland	Brian Johnson, San Jose
Center	Will Rabatin, Columbus	Kyle Moore-Brown, Colorado
Offensive lineman	Phil Bogle, Philadelphia; Martin Bibla, Philadelphia	Howard Duncan, Columbus; Ryan Hayslip, Georgia
Wide receiver	Chris Jackson, Philadelphia; Huey Whittaker, Utah; T.T. Toliver, Orlando	Otis Amey, Cleveland; Kenny Higgins, Grand Rapids; Damian Harrell, Chicago

Defense
Position	First team	Second team
Defensive lineman	Aaron McConnell, Colorado; Colston Weatherington, Dallas; Henry Taylor, New York	Bryan Save, Philadelphia; Gabe Nyenhuis, Philadelphia; Tim McGill, Tampa Bay
Middle linebacker	Steve Watson, San Jose	Duke Pettijohn, Dallas
Jack linebacker	DeJuan Alfonzo, Chicago	Norman LeJeune, New Orleans
Defensive back	Dennison Robinson, Chicago; Marquis Floyd, San Jose; Billy Parker, New York	Clevan Thomas, San Jose; Eddie Moten, Philadelphia; Kenny McEntyre, Orlando

Special teams
Position	First team	Second team
Kicker	A. J. Haglund, San Jose	Remy Hamilton, Dallas
