= ArenaBowl XXI =

| Columbus Destroyers (National) | San Jose SaberCats (American) |
|---|---|
| 33 | 55 |
| | 1 | 2 | 3 | 4 | Total |
|---|---|---|---|---|---|
| COL | 7 | 7 | 13 | 6 | 33 |
| SJ | 14 | 13 | 7 | 21 | 55 |
- Date: July 29, 2007
- Stadium: New Orleans Arena, New Orleans, Louisiana
- MVP: Mark Grieb, QB, San Jose: Mark Grieb, QB, San Jose (Offensive Player of the Game); Omarr Smith, DB, San Jose (Defensive Player of the Game); Phil Glover, FB/LB, San Jose (Ironman of the Game)
- Attendance: 17,056
- Winning coach: Darren Arbet
- Losing coach: Doug Kay

TV in the United States
- Network: ABC, ABC HD
- Announcers: Mike Greenberg and Mike Golic

ArenaBowl XXI was the 2007 championship game of the Arena Football League and was played at the New Orleans Arena in New Orleans, Louisiana on Sunday, July 29, 2007. It was the third-ever neutral site title game in league's history and the first held in the state of Louisiana. ArenaBowl XXI pitted the Columbus Destroyers of the National Conference against the San Jose SaberCats of the American Conference.

== Game summary ==
San Jose took the control of the ball first, after Columbus won the coin toss and deferred to the second half, and scored first on a touchdown run by Brian Johnson. Columbus then tied the score at seven on a touchdown run by Harold Wells. Each team threw for a touchdown to make it 14–14. Trestin George of San Jose then returned the kickoff, following Columbus' second touchdown, for a touchdown, but A.J. Haglund missed the Point-After-Try (PAT) making it 20-14. On the ensuing possession, San Jose's Clevan Thomas intercepted a pass, and San Jose capitalized on the turnover, extending the lead to 27–14. This would be the halftime score.

The teams traded scores in the third quarter, and into the beginning of the fourth quarter until it was 41-27 San Jose, and an errant Matt Nagy pass fell into the arms of San Jose's Omarr Smith.

A Mark Grieb touchdown pass to James Roe made it 48–27 San Jose, and a touchdown by each team led to the final score of San Jose 55, Columbus 33. San Jose won their third Arena Football League title, all since 2002.

== Post-game ==
Grieb was named the MVP, having thrown just five incomplete passes and no interceptions over the course of the game. He was awarded a Mitsubishi Spyder for his performance. Coach Darren Arbet became the second coach to win three ArenaBowls (Tampa Bay Storm coach Tim Marcum has seven).

The game was the first of three neutral-site ArenaBowls to sell out, doing so six weeks before the game in early June. An estimated 40% of the crowd was from outside of the New Orleans area, and led to an overall economic impact of around $25 million for the city of New Orleans.
