= 2011 Utah Blaze season =

Arena Football League team season

- Head coach: Ron James
- Home stadium: EnergySolutions Arena

Results
- Record: 9–9
- Division place: 3rd in NC West
- Playoffs: Did not qualify

The 2011 Utah Blaze season was the fifth season for the franchise in the Arena Football League. The team was coached by Ron James and moved back to EnergySolutions Arena for home games, after playing at Maverik Center in 2010. The Blaze finished the season 9–9, missing the playoffs.

== Standings ==
West Division
Team	W	L	PCT	PF	PA	DIV	CON	Home	Away
z-Arizona Rattlers	16	2	.889	1114	836	5–1	9–2	8–1	8–1
x-Spokane Shock	9	9	.500	1057	1027	3–3	6–5	7–2	2–7
Utah Blaze	9	9	.500	1082	1117	2–4	4–7	7–2	2–7
San Jose SaberCats	7	11	.389	1022	1080	2–4	4–7	6–3	1–8

z - Clinched division and conference's best record
x - Clinched playoff berth

== Regular season schedule ==
The Blaze had a bye week in Week 1, and began the season the following week at home against the Tampa Bay Storm on March 17. Their final regular season game was on July 22 on the road against the Cleveland Gladiators.

Week	Day	Date	Kickoff	Opponent	Results		Location	Report
Week	Day	Date	Kickoff	Opponent	Score	Record	Location	Report
1	Bye							
2	Thursday	March 17	5:00 p.m. MDT	Tampa Bay Storm	W 72–36	1–0	EnergySolutions Arena	
3	Saturday	March 26	5:30 p.m. MDT	at Orlando Predators	L 53–68	1–1	Amway Center	
4	Thursday	March 31	5:00 p.m. MDT	Dallas Vigilantes	W 69–40	2–1	EnergySolutions Arena	
5	Friday	April 8	8:30 p.m. MDT	at San Jose SaberCats	L 55–75	2–2	HP Pavilion at San Jose	
6	Friday	April 15	3:00 p.m. MDT	Spokane Shock	W 69–62	3–2	EnergySolutions Arena	
7	Saturday	April 23	6:05 p.m. MDT	at Arizona Rattlers	L 61–67 (OT)	3–3	US Airways Center	
8	Bye							
9	Friday	May 6	6:05 p.m. MDT	at Georgia Force	W 74–71	4–3	Arena at Gwinnett Center	
10	Saturday	May 14	3:00 p.m. MDT	Milwaukee Mustangs	L 53–65	4–4	EnergySolutions Arena	
11	Saturday	May 21	3:00 p.m. MDT	San Jose SaberCats	W 76–68	5–4	EnergySolutions Arena	
12	Friday	May 27	6:05 p.m. MDT	at Iowa Barnstormers	L 48–50	5–5	Wells Fargo Arena	
13	Saturday	June 4	3:00 p.m. MDT	Arizona Rattlers	L 37–72	5–6	EnergySolutions Arena	
14	Saturday	June 11	6:00 p.m. MDT	at Tulsa Talons	L 51–81	5–7	BOK Center	
15	Saturday	June 18	7:05 p.m. MDT	Pittsburgh Power	W 81–40	6–7	EnergySolutions Arena	
16	Friday	June 24	6:00 p.m. MDT	Kansas City Command	W 61–60	7–7	EnergySolutions Arena	
17	Friday	July 1	6:30 p.m. MDT	at Chicago Rush	L 35–59	7–8	Allstate Arena	
18	Saturday	July 9	7:00 p.m. MDT	at Spokane Shock	L 49–76	7–9	Joe Albi Stadium	
19	Saturday	July 16	7:00 p.m. MDT	New Orleans VooDoo	W 62–58	8–9	EnergySolutions Arena	
20	Friday	July 22	5:30 p.m. MDT	at Cleveland Gladiators	W 76–69	9–9	Quicken Loans Arena	

== Regular season ==
=== Week 2: vs. Tampa Bay Storm ===
Week 2: Tampa Bay Storm at Utah Blaze – Game summary

Quarter	1	2	3	4	Total
Storm	10	13	7	6	36
Blaze	13	18	12	29	72

at EnergySolutions Arena, Salt Lake City, Utah

- Date: March 17
- Game time: 9:00 p.m. EDT
- Game attendance: 10,077
- Referee: Steve Strimling
- Recap

Game information

1st quarter

- Tampa Bay – (10:39) Kyle Chilton 30-yard field goal, Tampa Bay 3–0
- Utah – (7:47) Alvan Robinson 6-yard pass from Tommy Grady (John Wehrle kick failed), Utah 6–3
- Tampa Bay – (6:08) Hank Edwards 23-yard pass from Grant Gregory (Kyle Chilton kick), Tampa Bay 10–6
- Utah – (2:24) Aaron Boone 21-yard pass from Tommy Grady (John Wehrle kick), Utah 13–10

2nd quarter

- Tampa Bay – (14:18) Hank Edwards 23-yard pass from Grant Gregory (Kyle Chilton kick failed), Tampa Bay 16–13
- Utah – (11:24) Aaron Boone 13-yard pass from Tommy Grady (John Wehrle kick failed), Utah 19–16
- Tampa Bay – (7:05) Michael Lindsey 10-yard pass from Grant Gregory (Kyle Chilton kick), Tampa Bay 23–19
- Utah – (4:59) Ben Stallings 6-yard run (John Wehrle kick failed), Utah 25–23
- Utah – (0:07) Ernie Pierce 15-yard pass from Tommy Grady (John Wehrle kick failed), Utah 31–23

3rd quarter

- Utah – (8:43) Alvan Robinson 26-yard pass from Tommy Grady (Tommy Grady pass failed), Utah 37–23
- Utah – (3:09) Aaron Lesue 33-yard pass from Tommy Grady (Tommy Grady pass failed), Utah 43–23
- Tampa Bay – (1:10) Huey Whittaker 31-yard pass from Grant Gregory (Kyle Chilton kick), Utah 43–30

4th quarter

- Utah – (13:38) Ben Stallings 4-yard run (Alvan Robinson pass), Utah 51–30
- Utah – (8:45) Tommy Grady 1-yard run (John Wehrle kick), Utah 58–30
- Utah – (3:58) Tommy Grady 1-yard run (John Wehrle kick), Utah 65–30
- Utah – (1:08) Jason Boone 1-yard pass from Tommy Grady (John Wehrle kick), Utah 72–30
- Tampa Bay – (0:48) Hank Edwards 33-yard pass from Mike Potts (Kyle Chilton kick failed), Utah 72–36

Passing

- Tampa Bay – Grant Gregory: 16/29, 186 yards, 4 TD, 2 INT
- Utah – Tommy Grady: 26/39, 306 yards, 7 TD

Rushing

- Tampa Bay – Grant Gregory: 2 att, 14 yards
- Utah – Ben Stallings: 6 att, 36 yards, 2 TD

Receiving

- Tampa Bay – Hank Edwards: 7 rec, 110 yards, 3 TD
- Utah – Aaron Boone: 11 rec, 135 yards, 2 TD

=== Week 3: at Orlando Predators ===
Week 3: Utah Blaze at Orlando Predators – Game summary

Quarter	1	2	3	4	Total
Blaze	13	6	14	20	53
Predators	14	23	7	24	68

at Amway Center, Orlando, Florida

- Date: March 26
- Game time: 5:30 p.m. MDT
- Game attendance: 12,186
- Referee: Kevin Stine
- Recap

Game information

1st quarter

- Orlando – (14:27) Bobby Sippio 29-yard pass from Nick Hill (Mark Lewis kick), Orlando 7–0
- Utah – (12:17) Aaron Boone 9-yard pass from Tommy Grady (John Wehrle kick), Tied 7–7
- Orlando – (10:31) T.T. Toliver 13-yard pass from Nick Hill (Mark Lewis kick), Orlando 14–7
- Utah – (7:39) Aaron Lesue 9-yard pass from Tommy Grady (John Wehrle kick failed), Orlando 14–13

2nd quarter

- Orlando – (13:08) T.T. Toliver 10-yard pass from Nick Hill (Mark Lewis kick), Orlando 21–13
- Orlando – (6:54) Robert Quiroga 2-yard pass from Nick Hill (Mark Lewis kick), Orlando 28–13
- Orlando – (2:37) Bobby Sippio 9-yard pass from Nick Hill (Collin Drafts rush failed), Orlando 34–13
- Utah – (0:35) Aaron Boone 2-yard pass from Tommy Grady (Ben Stallings rush failed), Orlando 34–19
- Orlando – (0:00) Mark Lewis 31-yard field goal, Orlando 37–19

3rd quarter

- Utah – (12:47) Aaron Boone 4-yard pass from Tommy Grady (Tommy Grady pass), Orlando 37–27
- Orlando – (5:55) Robert Quiroga 5-yard pass from Nick Hill (Mark Lewis kick), Orlando 44–27
- Utah – (3:53) Ernest Pierce 2-yard pass from Tommy Grady (John Wehrle kick failed), Orlando 44–33

4th quarter

- Orlando – (14:55) T.T. Toliver 34-yard pass from Nick Hill (Mark Lewis kick), Orlando 51–33
- Orlando – (11:31) Rayshaun Kizer 20-yard interception return (Mark Lewis kick), Orlando 58–33
- Utah – (6:38) Aaron Boone 9-yard pass from Tommy Grady (Tommy Grady pass intercepted), Orlando 58–39
- Orlando – (3:29) Mark Lewis 36-yard field goal, Orlando 61–39
- Utah – (0:33) Aaron Boone 4-yard pass from Tommy Grady (Tommy Grady pass failed), Orlando 61–45
- Orlando – (0:26) Robert Quiroga 34-yard pass from Nick Hill (Mark Lewis kick), Orlando 68–45
- Utah – (0:02) Aaron Boone 6-yard pass from Tommy Grady (Ben Stallings rush), Orlando 68–53

Passing

- Utah – Tommy Grady: 31/49, 318 yards, 8 TD, 3 INT
- Orlando – Nick Hill: 24/36, 331 yards, 8 TD, 1 INT

Rushing

- Utah – Tommy Grady: 2 att, 2 yards
- Orlando – Nick Hill: 1 att, 10 yards

Receiving

- Utah – Ernest Pierce: 12 rec, 138 yards, 1 TD
- Orlando – T.T. Toliver: 9 rec, 124 yards, 3 TD

=== Week 4: vs. Dallas Vigilantes ===
Week 4: Dallas Vigilantes at Utah Blaze – Game summary

Quarter	1	2	3	4	Total
Vigilantes	7	13	6	14	40
Blaze	7	27	21	14	69

at EnergySolutions Arena, Salt Lake City, Utah

- Date: March 31
- Game time: 5:00 p.m. MDT
- Game attendance: 7,163
- Referee: Shawn Hochuli
- Recap

Game information

1st quarter

- Utah – (9:34) Ernest Pierce 5-yard pass from Tommy Grady (Greg Gunderson kick), Utah 7–0
- Dallas – (6:43) Anthony Jones 8-yard pass from Dan Raudabaugh (Remy Hamilton kick), Tied 7–7

2nd quarter

- Utah – (14:58) Ben Stallings 1-yard run (Greg Gunderson kick), Utah 14–7
- Dallas – (10:02) Anthony Jones 32-yard pass from Dan Raudabaugh (Remy Hamilton kick failed), Utah 14–13
- Utah – (8:19) Alvance Robinson 11-yard pass from Tommy Grady (Greg Gunderson kick), Utah 21–13
- Dallas – (7:16) Matt Fields 18-yard pass from Dan Raudabaugh (Remy Hamilton kick), Utah 21–20
- Utah – (1:49) Aaron Lesue 8-yard pass from Tommy Grady (Greg Gunderson kick), Utah 28–20
- Utah – (0:08) Alvance Robinson 13-yard pass from Tommy Grady (Greg Gunderson kick blocked), Utah 34–20

3rd quarter

- Dallas – (12:33) Derrick Ross 1-yard run (Remy Hamilton kick failed), Utah 34–26
- Utah – (10:17) Ben Stallings 1-yard run (Greg Gunderson kick), Utah 41–26
- Utah – (5:28) Aaron Boone 19-yard pass from Tommy Grady (Greg Gunderson kick), Utah 48–26
- Utah – (1:28) Aaron Boone 35-yard pass from Tommy Grady (Greg Gunderson kick), Utah 55–26

4th quarter

- Dallas – (14:42) Matt Fields 11-yard pass from Dan Radabaugh (Luke Drone rush failed), Utah 55–32
- Utah – (10:59) Tommy Grady 1-yard run (Greg Gunderson kick), Utah 62–32
- Dallas – (9:20) Anthony Jones 9-yard pass from Dan Raudabaugh (Derrick Ross rush), Utah 62–40
- Utah – (6:32) Tommy Grady 1-yard run (Greg Gunderson kick), Utah 69–40

Passing

- Dallas – Dan Raudabaugh: 15/19, 220 yards, 5 TD, 3 INT
- Utah – Tommy Grady: 28/46, 342 yards, 6 TD

Rushing

- Dallas – Derrick Ross: 6 att, 29 yards, 1 TD
- Utah – Ben Stallings: 6 att, 4 yards, 2 TD

Receiving

- Dallas – Anthony Jones: 10 rec, 133 yards, 3 TD
- Utah – Aaron Boone: 13 rec, 226 yards, 2 TD

=== Week 5: at San Jose SaberCats ===
Week 5: Utah Blaze at San Jose SaberCats – Game summary

Quarter	1	2	3	4	Total
Blaze	14	14	6	21	55
SaberCats	14	26	7	28	75

at HP Pavilion at San Jose, San Jose, California

- Date: April 8
- Game time: 8:30 p.m. MDT
- Game attendance: 8,763
- Referee: Shawn Hochuli

Game information

1st quarter

- San Jose – (12:38) Chad Cook 3-yard run (Juan Gamboa kick), San Jose 7–0
- Utah – (9:54) Ernest Pierce 14-yard pass from Tommy Grady (Greg Gunderson kick), Tied 7–7
- San Jose – (7:50) Nicherin Flowers 3-yard run (Juan Gamboa kick), San Jose 14–7
- Utah – (1:18) Ben Stallings 2-yard run (Greg Gunderson kick), Tied 14–14

2nd quarter

- San Jose – (13:10) Samora Goodson 8-yard pass from Mark Grieb (Juan Gamboa kick blocked), San Jose 20–14
- Utah – (9:03) Aaron Boone 10-yard pass from Tommy Grady (Greg Gunderson kick), Utah 21–20
- San Jose – (5:12) Nicherin Flowers 5-yard pass from Mark Grieb (Juan Gamboa kick failed), San Jose 26–21
- Utah – (3:58) Alvance Robinson 35-yard pass from Tommy Grady (Greg Gunderson kick), Utah 28–26
- San Jose – (2:02) Chad Cook 2-yard run (Juan Gamboa kick), San Jose 33–28
- San Jose – (0:09) Samora Goodson 2-yard pass from Mark Grieb (Juan Gamboa kick), San Jose 40–28

3rd quarter

- San Jose – (10:07) Samora Goodson 9-yard pass from Mark Grieb (Juan Gamboa kick), San Jose 47–28
- Utah – (7:42) Aaron Boone 40-yard pass from Tommy Grady (Greg Gunderson kick failed), San Jose 47–34

4th quarter

- Utah – (14:56) Aaron Boone 10-yard pass from Tommy Grady (Greg Gunderson kick), San Jose 47–41
- San Jose – (11:48) Samora Goodson 9-yard pass from Mark Grieb (Juan Gamboa kick), San Jose 54–41
- San Jose – (3:17) Chido Nwokocha 30-yard pass from Mark Grieb (Juan Gamboa kick), San Jose 61–41
- Utah – (0:42) Ernest Pierce 2-yard pass from Tommy Grady (Greg Gunderson kick), San Jose 61–48
- San Jose – (0:35) Chad Cook 13-yard run (Juan Gamboa kick), San Jose 68–48
- Utah – (0:28) Alvance Robinson 55-yard kickoff return (Greg Gunderson kick), San Jose 68–55
- San Jose – (0:17) Chad Cook 9-yard run (Juan Gamboa kick), San Jose 75–55

Passing

- Utah – Tommy Grady: 27/48, 321 yards, 6 TD, 1 INT
- San Jose – Nick Hill: 25/33, 279 yards, 6 TD

Rushing

- Utah – Tommy Grady: 1 att, 12 yards
- San Jose – Chad Cook: 6 att, 33 yards, 4 TD

Receiving

- Utah – Aaron Boone: 11 rec, 147 yards, 3 TD
- San Jose – Samora Goodson: 11 rec, 113 yards, 4 TD

=== Week 6: vs. Spokane Shock ===
Week 6: Spokane Shock at Utah Blaze – Game summary

Quarter	1	2	3	4	Total
Shock	7	14	14	27	62
Blaze	13	21	14	21	69

at EnergySolutions Arena, Salt Lake City, Utah

- Date: April 15
- Game time: 3:00 p.m. MDT
- Game attendance: 7,649
- Referee: Shawn Anderson
- Recap

Game information

1st quarter

- Utah – (10:48) Aaron Boone 8-yard pass from Tommy Grady (Greg Gunderson kick failed), Utah 6–0
- Spokane – (6:12) Shaun Kauleinamoku 7-yard pass from Kyle Rowley (Taylor Rowan kick), Spokane 7–6
- Utah – (2:03) Ben Stallings 2-yard run (Greg Gunderson kick), Utah 13–7

2nd quarter

- Utah – (13:10) Aaron Lesue 10-yard pass from Tommy Grady (Greg Gunderson kick), Utah 20–7
- Spokane – (10:41) Greg Orton 16-yard pass from Kyle Rowley (Taylor Rowan kick), Utah 20–14
- Utah – (7:42) Aaron Boone 5-yard pass from Tommy Grady (Greg Gunderson kick), Utah 27–14
- Utah – (1:08) Ben Stallings 10-yard run (Greg Gunderson kick), Utah 34–14
- Spokane – (0:04) Greg Orton 1-yard pass from Kyle Rowley (Taylor Rowan kick), Utah 34–21

3rd quarter

- Spokane – (10:55) Emery Sammons 6-yard pass from Kyle Rowley (Taylor Rowan kick), Utah 34–28
- Utah – (7:20) Aaron Lesue 9-yard pass from Tommy Grady (Greg Gunderson kick), Utah 41–28
- Spokane – (5:35) Greg Orton 26-yard pass from Kyle Rowley (Taylor Rowan kick), Utah 41–35
- Utah – (0:38) Aaron Lesue 3-yard pass from Tommy Grady (Greg Gunderson kick), Utah 48–35

4th quarter

- Spokane – (11:59) Greg Orton 4-yard pass from Kyle Rowley (Taylor Rowan kick), Utah 48–42
- Utah – (10:07) Ben Stallings 21-yard run (Greg Gunderson kick), Utah 55–42
- Spokane – (5:06) Greg Orton 12-yard pass from Kyle Rowley (Taylor Rowan kick), Utah 55–49
- Utah – (4:28) Ernest Pierce 7-yard kickoff return (Greg Gunderson kick), Utah 62–49
- Spokane – (1:27) Shaun Kauleinamoku 2-yard pass from Kyle Rowley (Taylor Rowan kick failed), Utah 62–55
- Utah – (0:49) Aaron Boone 9-yard pass from Tommy Grady (Greg Gunderson kick), Utah 69–55
- Spokane – (0:19) Shaun Kauleinamoku 2-yard pass from Kyle Rowley (Taylor Rowan kick), Utah 69–62

Passing

- Spokane – Kyle Rowley: 35/43, 323 yards, 9 TD
- Utah – Tommy Grady: 26/33, 245 yards, 6 TD

Rushing

- Spokane – Clay Harrell: 1 att, 13 yards
- Utah – Ben Stallings: 5 att, 33 yards, 3 TD

Receiving

- Spokane – Greg Orton: 14 rec, 146 yards, 5 TD
- Utah – Aaron Boone: 10 rec, 100 yards, 3 TD

=== Week 7: at Arizona Rattlers ===
Week 7: Utah Blaze at Arizona Rattlers – Game summary

Quarter	1	2	3	4	OT	Total
Blaze	7	26	13	15	0	61
Rattlers	14	20	7	20	6	67

at US Airways Center, Phoenix, Arizona

- Date: April 23
- Game time: 6:05 p.m. MDT
- Game attendance: 8,717
- Referee: Shane Anderson
- Recap

Game information

1st quarter

- Arizona – (11:19) Kerry Reed 4-yard pass from Nick Davila (Fabrizio Scaccia kick), Arizona 7–0
- Utah – (8:18) Alvance Robinson 27-yard pass from Tommy Grady (Greg Gunderson kick), Tied 7–7
- Arizona – (3:38) Trandon Harvey 6-yard pass from Nick Davila (Fabrizio Scaccia kick), Arizona 14–7

2nd quarter

- Utah – (14:53) Alvance Robinson 21-yard pass from Tommy Grady (Greg Gunderson kick), Tied 14–14
- Arizona – (10:15) Rod Windsor 3-yard pass from Nick Davila (Fabrizio Scaccia kick), Arizona 21–14
- Utah – (9:00) Alvance Robinson 45-yard pass from Tommy Grady (Greg Gunderson kick), Tied 21–21
- Arizona – (5:07) Nick Davila 3-yard run (Fabrizio Scaccia kick), Arizona 28–21
- Utah – (3:57) Aaron Lesue 36-yard pass from Tommy Grady (Greg Gunderson kick failed), Arizona 28–27
- Arizona – (1:05) Trandon Harvey 11-yard pass from Nick Davila (Fabrizio Scaccia kick failed), Arizona 34–27
- Utah – (0:49) Aaron Lesue 6-yard pass from Tommy Grady, Arizona 34–33

3rd quarter

- Utah – (12:30) Alvance Robinson 5-yard pass from Tommy Grady (Greg Gunderson kick), Utah 40–34
- Utah – (5:44) Aaron Boone 6-yard pass from Tommy Grady (Greg Gunderson kick failed), Utah 46–34
- Arizona – (1:46) Odie Armstrong 6-yard run (Fabrizio Scaccia kick), Utah 46–41

4th quarter

- Arizona – (11:50) Odie Armstrong 7-yard run (Trevor Harris rush failed), Arizona 47–46
- Arizona – (10:19) Virgil Gray 0-yard net recovery (Fabrizio Scaccia kick), Arizona 54–46
- Utah – (4:31) Aaron Boone 4-yard pass from Tommy Grady (Greg Gunderson kick), Arizona 54–53
- Arizona – (2:29) Rod Windsor 4-yard pass from Nick Davila (Fabrizio Scaccia kick), Arizona 61–53
- Utah – (0:00) Aaron Boone 5-yard pass from Tommy Grady (Tommy Grady pass), Tied 61–61

Overtime

- Arizona – (11:19) Rod Windsor 38-yard pass from Nick Davilla, Arizona 67–61

Passing

- Utah – Tommy Grady: 30/39, 358 yards, 9 TD, 1 INT
- Arizona – Nick Davila: 35/42, 361 yards, 6 TD, 1 INT

Rushing

- Utah – Tommy Grady: 6 att, 1 yard
- Arizona – Odie Armstrong: 6 att, 28 yards, 2 TD

Receiving

- Utah – Alvance Robinson: 12 rec, 174 yards, 4 TD
- Arizona – Rod Windsor: 15 rec, 161 yards, 3 TD

=== Week 9: at Georgia Force ===
Week 9: Utah Blaze at Georgia Force – Game summary

Quarter	1	2	3	4	Total
Blaze	12	28	14	20	74
Force	13	21	14	23	71

at Arena at Gwinnett Center, Duluth, Georgia

- Date: May 6
- Game time: 6:05 p.m. MDT
- Game attendance: 3,259
- Referee: Kevin Stine

Game information

1st quarter

- Georgia – (11:03) Maurice Purify 7-yard pass from Brett Elliott (Brian Jackson kick), Georgia 7–0
- Utah – (6:55) Alvance Robinson 5-yard pass from Tommy Grady (Greg Gunderson kick failed), Georgia 7–6
- Utah – (4:11) Aaron Boone 16-yard pass from Tommy Grady (Greg Gunderson kick failed), Utah 12–7
- Georgia – (0:32) Maurice Purify 23-yard pass from Brett Elliott (Brian Jackson kick failed), Georgia 13–12

2nd quarter

- Utah – (12:59) Aaron Boone 20-yard pass from Tommy Grady (Greg Gunderson kick), Utah 19–13
- Georgia – (12:11) C.J. Johnson 56-yard kickoff return (Brian Jackson kick), Georgia 20–19
- Utah – (11:13) Ernest Pierce 10-yard kickoff return (Greg Gunderson kick), Utah 26–20
- Georgia – (7:10) C.J. Johnson 3-yard pass from Brett Elliott (Brian Jackson kick), Georgia 27–26
- Utah – (2:42) Jason Boone 4-yard pass from Tommy Grady (Greg Gunderson kick), Utah 33–27
- Georgia – (0:54) C.J. Johnson 27-yard pass from Brett Elliott (Brian Jackson kick), Georgia 34–33
- Utah – (0:00) Aaron Lesue 2-yard pass from Tommy Grady (Greg Gunderson kick), Utah 40–34

3rd quarter

- Utah – (8:58) Alvance Robinson 15-yard pass from Tommy Grady (Greg Gunderson kick), Utah 47–34
- Utah – (7:20) Alvance Robinson 3-yard pass from Tommy Grady (Greg Gunderson kick), Utah 54–34
- Georgia – (5:55) C.J. Johnson 30-yard pass from Brett Elliott (Brian Jackson kick), Utah 54–41
- Georgia – (3:15) Larry Shipp 7-yard pass from Brett Elliott (Brian Jackson kick), Utah 54–48

4th quarter

- Utah – (14:56) Aaron Lesue 14-yard pass from Tommy Grady (Greg Gunderson kick), Utah 61–48
- Georgia – (11:58) Maurice Purify 2-yard pass from Brett Elliott (Brian Jackson kick), Utah 61–55
- Georgia – (10:42) Team safety, Utah 61–57
- Georgia – (8:31) Larry Shipp 13-yard pass from Brett Elliott (Brian Jackson kick), Georgia 64–61
- Utah – (5:17) Aaron Lesue 15-yard pass from Tommy Grady (Greg Gunderson kick blocked), Utah 67–64
- Georgia – (3:33) Maurice Purify 39-yard pass from Brett Elliott (Brian Jackson kick), Georgia 71–67
- Utah – (0:04) Aaron Boone 2-yard pass from Tommy Grady (Greg Gunderson kick), Utah 74–71

Passing

- Utah – Tommy Grady: 33/45, 344 yards, 10 TD
- Georgia – Brett Elliott: 27/38, 374 yards, 9 TD

Rushing

- Utah – Tommy Grady: 3 att, 11 yards
- Georgia – Brett Elliott: 2 att, 5 yards

Receiving

- Utah – Aaron Boone: 18 rec, 196 yards, 3 TD
- Georgia – Maurice Purify: 9 rec, 141 yards, 1 TD

=== Week 10: vs. Milwaukee Mustangs ===
Week 10: Milwaukee Mustangs at Utah Blaze – Game summary

Quarter	1	2	3	4	Total
Mustangs	24	9	3	29	65
Blaze	6	13	14	20	53

at EnergySolutions Arena, Salt Lake City, Utah

- Date: May 14
- Game time: 3:00 p.m. MDT
- Game attendance: 7,667
- Referee: David Cutaia
- Recap

Game information

1st quarter

- Milwaukee – (12:28) Garrett Lindholm 19-yard field goal, Milwaukee 3–0
- Utah – (9:39) Aaron Lesue 21-yard pass from Tommy Grady (Greg Gunderson kick failed), Utah 6–3
- Milwaukee – (4:27) Dwayne Eley Jr. 47-yard pass from R.J. Archer (Garrett Lindholm kick), Milwaukee 10–6
- Milwaukee – (1:46) Mykel Benson 1-yard run (Garrett Lindholm kick), Milwaukee 17–6
- Milwaukee – (0:00) Mykel Benson 4-yard run (Garrett Lindholm kick), Milwaukee 24–6

2nd quarter

- Utah – (12:10) Aaron Lesue 5-yard pass from Tommy Grady (Greg Gunderson kick), Milwaukee 24–13
- Milwaukee – (9:45) Dwayne Eley Jr. 44-yard pass from R.J. Archer (Eric Ward rush failed), Milwaukee 30–13
- Milwaukee – (1:18) Garrett Lindholm 23-yard field goal, Milwaukee 33–13
- Utah – (0:00) Eddie Jackson 9-yard pass from Tommy Grady (Tommy Grady pass failed), Milwaukee 33–19

3rd quarter

- Milwaukee – (10:07) Garrett Lindholm 17-yard field goal, Milwaukee 36–19
- Utah – (7:03) Alvance Robinson 6-yard pass from Tommy Grady (Greg Gunderson kick), Milwaukee 36–26
- Utah – (0:09) Aaron Boone 6-yard pass from Tommy Grady (Greg Gunderson kick), Milwaukee 36–33

4th quarter

- Utah – (11:32) Aaron Boone 8-yard pass from Tommy Grady (Greg Gunderson kick failed), Utah 39–36
- Milwaukee – (8:07) Brent Holmes 1-yard run (Garrett Lindholm drop-kick failed), Milwaukee 42–39
- Milwaukee – (6:49) Marcus Everett 0-yard fumble recovery (Garrett Lindholm kick), Milwaukee 49–39
- Utah – (2:11) Aaron Boone 13-yard pass from Tommy Grady (Greg Gunderson kick), Milwaukee 49–46
- Milwaukee – (0:58) Mykel Benson 5-yard run (Garrett Lindholm kick), Milwaukee 56–46
- Utah – (0:30) Aaron Boone 17-yard pass from Tommy Grady (Greg Gunderson kick), Milwaukee 56–53
- Milwaukee – (0:17) Garrett Lindholm 25-yard field goal, Milwaukee 59–53
- Milwaukee – (0:00) Kelvin Rogers 52-yard interception return, Milwaukee 65–53

Passing

- Milwaukee – R.J. Archer: 19/28, 304 yards, 2 TD
- Utah – Tommy Grady: 28/48, 296 yards, 8 TD, 1 INT

Rushing

- Milwaukee – Mykel Benson: 12 att, 18 yards, 3 TD
- Utah – Tommy Grady: 2 att, 0 yards

Receiving

- Milwaukee – Dwayne Eley Jr.: 3 rec, 98 yards, 2 TD
- Utah – Aaron Boone: 10 rec, 89 yards, 4 TD

=== Week 11: vs. San Jose SaberCats ===
Week 11: San Jose SaberCats at Utah Blaze – Game summary

Quarter	1	2	3	4	Total
SaberCats	14	21	20	13	68
Blaze	21	14	14	27	76

at EnergySolutions Arena, Salt Lake City, Utah

- Date: May 21
- Game time: 3:00 p.m. MDT
- Game attendance: 8,815
- Referee: Shawn Anderson
- Recap

Game information

1st quarter

- Utah – (11:48) Ernie Pierce 10-yard pass from Tommy Grady (Andrew Aguila kick), Utah 7–0
- San Jose – (10:40) Ben Nelson 13-yard pass from Mark Grieb (Juan Gamboa kick), Tied 7–7
- Utah – (9:15) Chris Bocage 20-yard pass from Tommy Grady (Andrew Aguila kick), Utah 14–7
- San Jose – (4:37) Chad Cook 4-yard run (Juan Gamboa kick), Tied 14–14
- Utah – (1:49) Alvance Robinson 14-yard pass from Tommy Grady (Andrew Aguila kick), Utah 21–14

2nd quarter

- San Jose – (8:48) Chad Cook 1-yard run (Juan Gamboa kick), Tied 21–21
- Utah – (7:17) Chris Bocage 7-yard pass from Tommy Grady (Andrew Aguila kick), Utah 28–21
- San Jose – (3:26) Ben Nelson 9-yard pass from Mark Grieb (Juan Gamboa kick), Tied 28–28
- Utah – (0:50) Chris Bocage 13-yard pass from Tommy Grady (Andrew Aguila kick), Utah 35–28
- San Jose – (0:04) Burl Toler 9-yard pass from Mark Grieb (Juan Gamboa kick), Tied 35–35

3rd quarter

- San Jose – (11:40) Mervin Brookins 21-yard pass from Mark Grieb (Juan Gamboa kick failed), San Jose 41–35
- Utah – (9:18) Ernie Pierce 23-yard pass from Tommy Grady (Andrew Aguila kick), Utah 42–41
- San Jose – (4:55) Mervin Brookins 23-yard pass from Mark Grieb (Juan Gamboa kick), San Jose 48–42
- Utah – (4:03) Chris Bocage 56-yard kickoff return (Andrew Aguila kick), Utah 49–48
- San Jose – (0:26) Chad Cook 3-yard run (Juan Gamboa kick), San Jose 55–49

4th quarter

- Utah – (13:00) Ernie Pierce 18-yard pass from Tommy Grady (Andrew Aguila kick), Utah 56–55
- Utah – (8:25) Jason Boone 3-yard pass from Tommy Grady (Andrew Aguila kick failed), Utah 62–55
- San Jose – (4:53) Ben Nelson 23-yard pass from Mark Grieb (Juan Gamboa kick), Tied 62–62
- Utah – (3:42) Alvance Robinson 47-yard pass from Tommy Grady (Andrew Aguila kick), Utah 69–62
- San Jose – (0:29) Ben Nelson 6-yard pass from Mark Grieb (Juan Gamboa kick blocked), Utah 69–68
- Utah – (0:05) Tommy Grady 8-yard run (Andrew Aguila kick), Utah 76–68

Passing

- San Jose – Brett Elliott: 29/43, 329 yards, 7 TD, 1 INT
- Utah – Tommy Grady: 23/32, 319 yards, 9 TD

Rushing

- San Jose – Chad Cook: 7 att, 26 yards, 3 TD
- Utah – Tommy Grady: 2 att, 8 yards, 1 TD

Receiving

- San Jose – Mervin Brookins: 13 rec, 152 yards, 2 TD
- Utah – Ernie Pierce: 10 rec, 136 yards, 3 TD

=== Week 12: at Iowa Barnstormers ===
Week 12: Utah Blaze at Iowa Barnstormers – Game summary

Quarter	1	2	3	4	Total
Blaze	20	14	14	0	48
Barnstormers	13	21	9	7	50

at Wells Fargo Arena, Des Moines, Iowa

- Date: May 27
- Game time: 6:05 p.m. MDT
- Game attendance: 7,884
- Referee: Jim Corpora
- Recap

Game information

1st quarter

- Utah – (14:07) Ernest Pierce 16-yard pass from Tommy Grady (Andrew Aguila kick), Utah 7–0
- Iowa – (11:15) Jesse Schmidt 31-yard pass from Brad Banks (Nick Pertuit kick failed), Utah 7–6
- Utah – (7:40) Ernest Pierce 9-yard pass from Tommy Grady (Andrew Aguila kick), Utah 14–6
- Iowa – (4:04) Jesse Schimdt 15-yard pass from Brad Banks (Nick Pertuit kick), Utah 14–13
- Utah – (1:06) Ernest Pierce 4-yard pass from Tommy Grady (Andrew Aguila kick failed), Utah 20–13

2nd quarter

- Iowa – (11:28) Errick McCown 15-yard pass from Brad Banks (Nick Pertuit kick), Tied 20–20
- Utah – (8:00) Alvance Robinson 11-yard pass from Tommy Grady (Andrew Aguila kick), Utah 27–20
- Iowa – (4:20) Errick McCown 4-yard pass from Brad Banks (Nick Pertuit kick), Tied 27–27
- Utah – (0:48) Ernest Pierce 29-yard pass from Tommy Grady (Andrew Aguila kick), Utah 34–27
- Iowa – (0:32) Marquis Hamilton 3-yard pass from Brad Banks (Nick Pertuit kick), Tied 34–34

3rd quarter

- Iowa – (14:22) Jesse Schmidt 16-yard pass from Brad Banks (Nick Pertuit kick failed), Iowa 40–34
- Utah – (10:26) Ben Stallings 4-yard run (Andrew Aguila kick), Utah 41–40
- Iowa – (2:36) Nick Pertuit 27-yard field goal, Iowa 43–41
- Utah – (2:21) Chris Bocage 58-yard kickoff return (Andrew Aguila kick), Utah 48–43

4th quarter

- Iowa – (10:32) Tommy Ellingworth 29-yard pass from Brad Banks (Nick Pertuit kick), Iowa 50–48

Passing

- Utah – Tommy Grady: 22/40, 276 yards, 5 TD, 1 INT
- Iowa – Brad Banks: 21/31, 223 yards, 7 TD

Rushing

- Utah – Ben Stallings: 4 att, 11 yards, 1 TD
- Iowa – Brad Banks: 12 att, 42 yards

Receiving

- Utah – Ernest Pierce: 10 rec, 163 yards, 4 TD
- Iowa – Jesse Schmidt: 5 rec, 87 yards, 3 TD

=== Week 13: vs. Arizona Rattlers ===
Week 13: Arizona Rattlers at Utah Blaze – Game summary

Quarter	1	2	3	4	Total
Rattlers	14	34	24	0	72
Blaze	12	7	6	12	37

at EnergySolutions Arena, Salt Lake City, Utah

- Date: June 4
- Game time: 3:00 p.m. MDT
- Game attendance: 7,997
- Referee: Shaun Hochuli
- Recap

Game information

1st quarter

- Arizona – (8:22) Trandon Harvey 12-yard pass from Nick Davila (Fabrizio Scaccia kick), Arizona 7–0
- Utah – (5:28) Ben Stallings 1-yard run (Andrew Aguila pass failed), Arizona 7–6
- Arizona – (4:15) Rod Windsor 17-yard pass from Nick Davila (Fabrizio Scaccia kick), Arizona 14–6
- Utah – (3:02) Ernest Pierce 11-yard pass from Tommy Grady (Andrew Aguila kick failed), Arizona 14–12

2nd quarter

- Arizona – (9:47) Rod Windsor 19-yard pass from Nick Davila (Fabrizio Scaccia kick), Arizona 21–12
- Arizona – (8:45) Riley Swanson 3-yard fumble recovery (Fabrizio Scaccia kick), Arizona 28–12
- Arizona – (4:26) Odie Armstrong 3-yard run (Fabrizio Scaccia kick), Arizona 35–12
- Arizona – (3:36) Marcus Tillman 7-yard net recovery (Fabrizio Scaccia kick), Arizona 42–12
- Utah – (0:33) Alvance Robinson 11-yard pass from Tommy Grady (Andrew Aguila kick), Arizona 42–19
- Arizona – (0:27) Virgil Gray 56-yard kickoff return (Fabrizio Scaccia kick failed), Arizona 48–19

3rd quarter

- Arizona – (11:57) Rod Windsor 8-yard pass from Trevor Harris (Fabrizio Scaccia kick), Arizona 55–19
- Arizona – (8:38) Fabrizio Scaccia 57-yard field goal, Arizona 58–19
- Utah – (6:13) Chris Bocage 4-yard pass from Tommy Grady (Tommy Grady pass failed), Arizona 58–25
- Arizona – (4:52) Odie Armstrong 19-yard run (Fabrizio Scaccia kick), Arizona 65–25
- Arizona – (0:10) Rod Windsor 9-yard pass from Trevor Harris (Fabrizio Scaccia kick), Arizona 72–25

4th quarter

- Utah – (10:30) Justin Ore 6-yard pass from Tommy Grady (Tommy Grady pass failed), Arizona 72–31
- Utah – (6:28) Ernest Pierce 42-yard pass from Jordan Rasmussen (Jordan Rasmussen rush failed), Arizona 72–37

Passing

- Arizona – Trevor Harris: 8/14, 87 yards, 2 TD
- Utah – Tommy Grady: 22/43, 156 yards, 4 TD, 1 INT

Rushing

- Arizona – Odie Armstrong: 7 att, 26 yards, 2 TD
- Utah – Ben Stallings: 1 att, 1 yard, 1 TD

Receiving

- Arizona – Rod Windsor: 10 rec, 98 yards, 4 TD
- Utah – Ernest Pierce: 14 rec, 128 yards, 2 TD

=== Week 14: at Tulsa Talons ===
Week 14: Utah Blaze at Tulsa Talons – Game summary

Quarter	1	2	3	4	Total
Blaze	13	20	12	6	51
Talons	6	35	26	14	81

at BOK Center, Tulsa, Oklahoma

- Date: June 11
- Game time: 6:00 p.m. MDT
- Game attendance: 4,940
- Referee: Dave Cutaia

Game information

1st quarter

- Utah – (14:40) Chris Bocage 55-yard kickoff return (Andrew Aguila kick), Utah 7–0
- Tulsa – (8:32) Troy McBroom 5-yard pass from Justin Allgood (Juan Bongarra kick failed), Utah 7–6
- Utah – (4:40) Ernest Pierce 9-yard pass from Tommy Grady (Andrew Aguila kick failed), Utah 13–6

2nd quarter

- Tulsa – (13:46) J.J. Payne 3-yard run (Juan Bongarra kick), Tied 13–13
- Tulsa – (11:17) J.C. Neal 52-yard interception return (Juan Bongarra kick), Tulsa 20–13
- Utah – (10:26) Justin Ore 45-yard pass from Tommy Grady (Andrew Aguila kick), Tied 20–20
- Tulsa – (8:55) Troy McBroom 9-yard pass from Justin Allgood (Juan Bongarra kick), Tulsa 27–20
- Utah – (5:49) Chris Bocage 9-yard pass from Tommy Grady (Andrew Aguila kick), Tied 27–27
- Utah – (3:49) Justin Ore 28-yard pass from Tommy Grady (Andrew Aguila kick failed), Utah 33–27
- Tulsa – (0:55) Al Hunt 7-yard pass from Justin Allgood (Juan Bongarra kick), Tulsa 34–33
- Tulsa – (0:00) Jamar Ransom 1-yard run (Juan Bongarra kick), Tulsa 41–33

3rd quarter

- Tulsa – (12:29) Troy McBroom 17-yard pass from Justin Allgood (Juan Bongarra kick failed), Tulsa 47–33
- Utah – (9:17) Justin Ore 7-yard pass from Tommy Grady (Andrew Aguila kick blocked), Tulsa 47–39
- Tulsa – (6:20) Troy McBroom 16-yard pass from Justin Allgood (Juan Bongarra kick), Tulsa 54–39
- Tulsa – (4:01) Jamar Ransom 4-yard fumble recovery (Juan Bongarra kick), Tulsa 61–39
- Utah – (1:34) Ernest Pierce 28-yard pass from Tommy Grady (Tommy Grady pass failed), Tulsa 61–45
- Tulsa – (0:28) J.C. Neal 8-yard kickoff return (Juan Bongarra kick failed), Tulsa 67–45

4th quarter

- Utah – (14:12) Ernest Pierce 4-yard pass from Tommy Grady (Tommy Grady pass intercepted), Tulsa 67–51
- Tulsa – (12:20) Trent Shelton 25-yard pass from Justin Allgood (Juan Bongarra kick), Tulsa 74–51
- Tulsa – (10:31) J.C. Neal 43-yard interception return (Juan Bongarra kick), Tulsa 81–51

Passing

- Utah – Tommy Grady: 26/36, 344 yards, 7 TD, 2 INT
- Tulsa – Justin Allgood: 24/34, 254 yards, 6 TD

Rushing

- Utah – Jordan Rasmussen: 1 att, 1 yard
- Tulsa – J.J. Payne: 5 att, 17 yards, 1 TD

Receiving

- Utah – Justin Ore: 13 rec, 199 yards, 3 TD
- Tulsa – Troy McBroom: 12 rec, 130 yards, 4 TD

=== Week 15: vs. Pittsburgh Power ===
Week 15: Pittsburgh Power at Utah Blaze – Game summary

Quarter	1	2	3	4	Total
Power	13	14	0	13	40
Blaze	21	20	19	21	81

at EnergySolutions Arena, Salt Lake City, Utah

- Date: June 18
- Game time: 7:05 p.m. MDT
- Game attendance: 9,096
- Referee: Tony Call
- Recap

Game information

1st quarter

- Utah – (12:53) Alvance Robinson 3-yard pass from Tommy Grady (Kyle Brotzman kick), Utah 7–0
- Pittsburgh – (10:34) Jerome Mathis 28-yard pass from Kevin McCabe (Paul Edinger kick failed), Utah 7–6
- Utah – (7:26) Alvance Robinson 7-yard pass from Tommy Grady (Kyle Brotzman kick), Utah 14–6
- Utah – (5:54) Brandon Taylor 5-yard fumble recovery (Kyle Brotzman kick), Utah 21–6
- Pittsburgh – (2:35) Craig Fulton 12-yard run (Paul Edinger kick), Utah 21–13

2nd quarter

- Utah – (13:47) Aaron Lesue 10-yard pass from Tommy Grady (Kyle Brotzman kick failed), Utah 27–13
- Pittsburgh – (8:33) Lonnell Dewalt 7-yard pass from Chris Wallace (Paul Edinger kick), Utah 27–20
- Utah – (4:18) Jason Boone 6-yard pass from Tommy Grady (Kyle Brotzman kick), Utah 34–20
- Pittsburgh – (1:42) Craig Fulton 6-yard pass from Chris Wallace (Paul Edinger kick), Utah 34–27
- Utah – (0:02) Aaron Lesue 1-yard pass from Tommy Grady (Kyle Brotzman kick), Utah 41–27

3rd quarter

- Utah – (13:48) Alvance Robinson 25-yard pass from Tommy Grady (Kyle Brotzman kick), Utah 48–27
- Utah – (12:30) Ernest Pierce 41-yard pass from Tommy Grady (Kyle Brotzman kick failed), Utah 54–27
- Utah – (7:21) Chris Bocage 9-yard pass from Tommy Grady (Kyle Brotzman kick failed), Utah 60–27

4th quarter

- Utah – (14:12) Aaron Lesue 10-yard pass from Tommy Grady (Kyle Brotzman kick), Utah 67–27
- Utah – (6:58) Aaron Lesue 6-yard pass from Tommy Grady (Kyle Brotzman kick), Utah 74–27
- Pittsburgh – (4:08) Jerome Mathis 8-yard pass from Chris Wallace (Chris Wallace pass failed), Utah 74–33
- Utah – (0:51) Aaron Lesue 12-yard pass from Tommy Grady (Kyle Brotzman kick), Utah 81–33
- Pittsburgh – (0:05) Jason Willis 5-yard pass from Chris Wallace (Paul Edinger kick), Utah 81–40

Passing

- Pittsburgh – Chris Wallace: 19/39, 196 yards, 4 TD
- Utah – Tommy Grady: 31/39, 313 yards, 10 TD

Rushing

- Pittsburgh – Craig Fulton: 1 att, 12 yards, 1 TD
- Utah – Ernest Pierce: 1 att, 8 yards

Receiving

- Pittsburgh – Jerome Mathis: 6 rec, 67 yards, 2 TD
- Utah – Aaron Lesue: 11 rec, 97 yards, 5 TD

=== Week 16: vs. Kansas City Command ===
Week 16: Kansas City Command at Utah Blaze – Game summary

Quarter	1	2	3	4	Total
Command	6	27	7	20	60
Blaze	13	20	14	14	61

at EnergySolutions Arena, Salt Lake City, Utah

- Date: June 24
- Game time: 6:00 p.m. MDT
- Game attendance: 9,270
- Referee: Shaun Hochuli
- Recap

Game information

1st quarter

- Utah – (13:51) Alvance Robinson 17-yard pass from Tommy Grady (Kyle Brotzman kick), Utah 7–0
- Kansas City – (8:01) Robert Gill 31-yard pass from Steve Wasil (Brian Umstead kick failed), Utah 7–6
- Utah – (5:46) Alvance Robinson 11-yard pass from Tommy Grady (Kyle Brotzman kick failed), Utah 13–6

2nd quarter

- Kansas City – (14:17) Bradley Chavez 31-yard pass from Steve Wasil (Brian Umstead kick failed), Utah 13–12
- Utah – (12:07) Jason Boone 12-yard pass from Ernest Pierce (Kyle Brotzman kick failed), Utah 19–12
- Kansas City – (9:35) Robert Gill 4-yard pass from Steve Wasil (Brian Umstead kick), Tied 19–19
- Utah – (8:03) Alvance Robinson 38-yard pass from Tommy Grady (Kyle Brotzman kick), Utah 26–19
- Kansas City – (5:01) Trey Bryant 6-yard run (Brian Umstead kick failed), Utah 26–25
- Utah – (3:28) Aaron Lesue 29-yard pass from Tommy Grady (Kyle Brotzman kick), Utah 33–25
- Kansas City – (1:40) Todd Devoe 5-yard pass from Steve Wasil (Steve Wasil rush), Tied 33–33

3rd quarter

- Kansas City – (13:12) Robert Gill 2-yard run (Brian Umstead kick), Kansas City 40–33
- Utah – (12:04) Alvance Robinson 18-yard pass from Tommy Grady (Kyle Brotzman kick), Tied 40–40
- Utah – (6:04) Aaron Lesue 2-yard pass from Tommy Grady (Kyle Brotzman kick), Utah 47–40

4th quarter

- Kansas City – (14:54) Robert Gill 7-yard pass from Steve Wasil (Brian Umstead kick), Tied 47–47
- Utah – (13:12) Aaron Lesue 17-yard pass from Tommy Grady (Kyle Brotzman kick), Utah 54–47
- Kansas City – (9:39) Bret Smith 12-yard pass from Steve Wasil (Brian Umstead kick), Tied 54–54
- Utah – (6:51) Alvance Robinson 8-yard pass from Tommy Grady (Kyle Brotzman kick), Utah 61–54
- Kansas City – (0:53) Bret Smith 6-yard pass from Steve Wasil (Brian Umstead kick blocked), Utah 61–60

Passing

- Kansas City – Chris Wallace: 30/43, 309 yards, 7 TD, 1 INT
- Utah – Tommy Grady: 18/26, 257 yards, 8 TD

Rushing

- Kansas City – Trey Bryant: 3 att, 14 yards, 1 TD
- Utah – Tommy Grady: 3 att, 3 yards

Receiving

- Kansas City – Robert Gill: 10 rec, 117 yards, 3 TD
- Utah – Alvance Robinson: 9 rec, 127 yards, 5 TD

=== Week 17: at Chicago Rush ===
Week 17: Utah Blaze at Chicago Rush – Game summary

Quarter	1	2	3	4	Total
Blaze	14	14	7	0	35
Rush	14	14	10	21	59

at Allstate Arena, Rosemont, Illinois

- Date: July 1
- Game time: 6:30 p.m. MDT
- Game attendance: 7,342
- Referee: Tom McCabe
- Recap

Game information

1st quarter

- Chicago – (12:34) Johnie Kirton 10-yard run (Rob Forstrom kick), Chicago 7–0
- Utah – (10:04) Aaron Lesue 9-yard pass from Tommy Grady (Kyle Brotzman kick), Tied 7–7
- Chicago – (7:59) Derek Lee 17-yard pass from J.J. Raterink (Rob Forstrom kick), Chicago 14–7
- Utah – (1:07) Ernest Pierce 19-yard pass from Tommy Grady (Kyle Brotzman kick), Tied 14–14

2nd quarter

- Chicago – (12:43) Charles Dillon 15-yard pass from J.J. Raterink (Rob Forstrom kick), Chicago 21–14
- Utah – (11:55) Aaron Lesue 19-yard pass from Tommy Grady (Kyle Brotzman kick), Tied 21–21
- Chicago – (10:45) Reggie Gray 45-yard pass from J.J. Raterink (Rob Forstrom kick), Chicago 28–21
- Utah – (6:12) Aaron Lesue 8-yard pass from Tommy Grady (Kyle Brotzman kick), Tied 28–28

3rd quarter

- Chicago – (10:24) Rob Forstrom 30-yard field goal, Chicago 31–28
- Utah – (8:14) Alvance Robinson 23-yard pass from Jordan Rasmussen (Kyle Brotzman kick), Utah 35–31
- Chicago – (4:27) Johnie Kirton 3-yard run (Rob Forstrom kick), Chicago 38–35

4th quarter

- Chicago – (13:02) J.J. Raterink 1-yard run (Rob Forstrom kick), Chicago 45–35
- Chicago – (4:28) Reggie Gray 37-yard pass from J.J. Raterink (Rob Forstrom kick), Chicago 52–35
- Chicago – (1:19) Johnie Kirton 4-yard run (Rob Forstrom kick), Chicago 59–35

Passing

- Utah – Tommy Grady: 10/16, 162 yards, 4 TD, 1 INT
- Chicago – Dominic Randolph: 19/33, 281 yards, 4 TD

Rushing

- Utah – Jordan Rasmussen: 2 att, 4 yards
- Chicago – Johnie Kirton: 9 att, 46 yards, 3 TD

Receiving

- Utah – Aaron Lesue: 10 rec, 126 yards, 3 TD
- Chicago – Reggie Gray: 5 rec, 142 yards, 2 TD

=== Week 18: at Spokane Shock ===
Week 18: Utah Blaze at Spokane Shock – Game summary

Quarter	1	2	3	4	Total
Blaze	14	21	7	7	49
Shock	14	35	13	14	76

at Joe Albi Stadium, Spokane, Washington

- Date: July 9
- Game time: 7:00 p.m. MDT
- Game attendance: 16,233
- Referee: Shane Anderson
- Recap

Game information

1st quarter

- Spokane – (13:12) Antwan Marsh 3-yard run (Taylor Rowan kick), Spokane 7–0
- Utah – (10:12) Aaron Lesue 13-yard pass from Todd Hammel (Kyle Brotzman kick), Tied 7–7
- Spokane – (4:56) Adron Tennell 6-yard pass from Erik Meyer (Taylor Rowan kick), Spokane 14–7
- Utah – (0:29) Alvance Robinson 4-yard pass from Todd Hammel (Kyle Brotzman kick), Tied 14–14

2nd quarter

- Spokane – (11:42) Erik Meyer 3-yard run (Taylor Rowan kick), Spokane 21–14
- Spokane – (9:52) Chas Gessner 24-yard pass from Erik Meyer (Taylor Rowan kick), Spokane 28–14
- Utah – (6:10) Ben Stallings 1-yard run (Kyle Brotzman kick), Spokane 28–21
- Spokane – (5:07) Brandon Thompkins 45-yard pass from Erik Meyer (Taylor Rowan kick), Spokane 35–21
- Utah – (2:47) Aaron Lesue 15-yard pass from Todd Hammel (Kyle Brotzman kick), Spokane 35–28
- Spokane – (1:20) Adron Tennell 11-yard pass from Erik Meyer (Taylor Rowan kick), Spokane 42–28
- Utah – (0:52) Michael Preston 39-yard pass from Todd Hammel (Kyle Brotzman kick), Spokane 42–35
- Spokane – (0:02) Emery Sammons 11-yard pass from Erik Meyer (Taylor Rowan kick), Spokane 49–35

3rd quarter

- Spokane – (11:40) Adron Tennell 6-yard pass from Erik Meyer (Taylor Rowan kick failed), Spokane 55–35
- Utah – (7:27) Ben Stallings 1-yard run (Kyle Brotzman kick), Spokane 55–42
- Spokane – (5:02) Erik Meyer 1-yard run (Taylor Rowan kick), Spokane 62–42

4th quarter

- Spokane – (11:52) Adron Tennell 25-yard pass from Kyle Rowley (Taylor Rowan kick), Spokane 69–42
- Utah – (9:57) Michael Preston 37-yard pass from Todd Hammel (Kyle Brotzman kick), Spokane 69–49
- Spokane – (2:53) Adron Tennell 7-yard pass from Kyle Rowley (Taylor Rowan kick), Spokane 76–49

Passing

- Utah – Todd Hammel: 23/34, 161 yards, 4 TD, 2 INT
- Spokane – Erik Meyer: 15/19, 166 yards, 6 TD

Rushing

- Utah – Ben Stallings: 8 att, 44 yards, 2 TD
- Spokane – Erik Meyer: 4 att, 17 yards, 2 TD

Receiving

- Utah – Michael Preston: 9 rec, 132 yards, 2 TD
- Spokane – Adron Tennell: 10 rec, 82 yards, 5 TD

=== Week 19: vs. New Orleans VooDoo ===
Week 19: New Orleans VooDoo at Utah Blaze – Game summary

Quarter	1	2	3	4	Total
VooDoo	14	24	17	3	58
Blaze	14	13	14	21	62

at EnergySolutions Arena, Salt Lake City, Utah

- Date: July 16
- Game time: 7:00 p.m. MDT
- Game attendance: 10,631
- Referee: Dave Cutaia
- Recap

Game information

1st quarter

- Utah – (13:00) Michael Preston 7-yard pass from Todd Hammel (Kyle Brotzman kick), Utah 7–0
- New Orleans – (8:35) P.J. Berry 15-yard pass from Danny Wimprine (Jonathan Ruffin kick), Tied 7–7
- Utah – (2:36) Ben Stallings 5-yard run (Kyle Brotzman kick), Utah 14–7
- New Orleans – (1:36) Carlese Franklin 9-yard pass from Danny Wimprine (Jonathan Ruffin kick), Tied 14–14

2nd quarter

- New Orleans – (11:49) Jonathan Ruffin 41-yard field goal, New Orleans 17–14
- Utah – (10:58) Aaron Lesue 12-yard pass from Todd Hammel (Kyle Brotzman kick), Utah 21–17
- New Orleans – (8:40) Skyler Green 11-yard pass from Danny Wimprine (Jonathan Ruffin kick), New Orleans 24–21
- New Orleans – (5:04) Carlese Franklin 28-yard pass from Danny Wimprine (Jonathan Ruffin kick), New Orleans 31–21
- Utah – (2:06) Ben Stallings 1-yard run (Kyle Brotzman kick failed), New Orleans 31–27
- New Orleans – (0:49) P.J. Berry 22-yard pass from Danny Wimprine (Jonathan Ruffin kick), New Orleans 38–27

3rd quarter

- New Orleans – (11:47) Skyler Green 2-yard pass from Danny Wimprine (Jonathan Ruffin kick), New Orleans 45–27
- Utah – (9:23) Michael Preston 19-yard pass from Todd Hammel (Kyle Brotzman kick), New Orleans 45–34
- New Orleans – (5:17) Jonathan Ruffin 44-yard field goal, New Orleans 48–34
- Utah – (5:06) Chris Bocage 55-yard kickoff return (Kyle Brotzman kick), New Orleans 48–41
- New Orleans – (0:55) Skyler Green 11-yard pass from Danny Wimprine (Jonathan Ruffin kick), New Orleans 55–41

4th quarter

- Utah – (11:20) Michael Preston 17-yard pass from Todd Hammel (Kyle Brotzman kick), New Orleans 55–48
- Utah – (3:45) Chris Bocage 2-yard run (Kyle Brotzman kick), Tied 55–55
- New Orleans – (0:35) Jonathan Ruffin 34-yard field goal, New Orleans 58–55
- Utah – (0:09) Chris Bocage 5-yard pass from Todd Hammel (Kyle Brotzman kick), Utah 62–58

Passing

- New Orleans – Chris Wallace: 19/34, 265 yards, 7 TD, 1 INT
- Utah – Tommy Grady: 26/39, 316 yards, 5 TD, 1 INT

Rushing

- New Orleans – P.J. Berry: 2 att, 4 yards
- Utah – Ben Stallings: 5 att, 13 yards, 2 TD

Receiving

- New Orleans – P.J. Berry: 7 rec, 101 yards, 2 TD
- Utah – Aaron Lesue: 10 rec, 116 yards, 1 TD

=== Week 20: at Cleveland Gladiators ===
Week 20: Utah Blaze at Cleveland Gladiators – Game summary

Quarter	1	2	3	4	Total
Blaze	9	25	13	29	76
Gladiators	13	21	14	21	69

at Quicken Loans Arena, Cleveland, Ohio

- Date: July 22
- Game time: 6:30 p.m. MDT
- Game attendance: 6,190
- Referee: Jim Corpora
- Recap

Game information

1st quarter

- Cleveland – (8:59) Thyron Lewis 15-yard pass from Kurt Rocco (Matt Denny kick), Cleveland 7–0
- Utah – (4:21) Alvance Robinson 6-yard pass from Todd Hammel (Kyle Brotzman kick), Tied 7–7
- Cleveland – (2:16) Dominick Goodman 16-yard pass from Kurt Rocco (Matt Denny kick blocked), Cleveland 13–7
- Utah – (2:16) Jeramie Richardson PAT return, Cleveland 13–9

2nd quarter

- Utah – (13:45) Justin Ore 6-yard pass from Todd Hammel (Kyle Brotzman rush), Utah 17–13
- Cleveland – (7:43) Russell Monk 3-yard run (Matt Denny kick), Cleveland 20–17
- Utah – (5:26) Justin Ore 24-yard pass from Todd Hammel (Kyle Brotzman kick), Utah 24–20
- Cleveland – (2:50) Robert Redd 24-yard pass from Kurt Rocco (Matt Denny kick), Cleveland 27–24
- Utah – (1:03) Alvance Robinson 39-yard pass from Todd Hammel (Kyle Brotzman kick), Utah 31–27
- Cleveland – (0:51) Robert Redd 11-yard pass from Kurt Rocco (Matt Denny kick), Cleveland 34–31
- Utah – (0:00) Kyle Brotzman 34-yard field goal, Tied 34–34

3rd quarter

- Cleveland – (13:10) Dominick Goodman 20-yard pass from Troy Weatherhead (Matt Denny kick), Cleveland 41–34
- Utah – (11:19) Alvance Robinson 32-yard pass from Todd Hammel (Kyle Brotzman kick), Tied 41–41
- Cleveland – (7:35) Thyron Lewis 1-yard run (Matt Denny kick), Cleveland 48–41
- Utah – (6:40) Chris Bocage 56-yard kickoff return (Kyle Brotzman kick blocked), Cleveland 48–47

4th quarter

- Cleveland – (14:48) Robert Redd 47-yard pass from Troy Weatherhead (Matt Denny kick), Cleveland 55–47
- Utah – (12:52) Ben Stallings 24-yard run (Todd Hammel pass failed), Cleveland 55–53
- Utah – (7:53) Ben Stallings 2-yard run (Todd Hammel pass), Utah 61–55
- Cleveland – (4:40) Dominick Goodman 4-yard pass from Troy Weatherhead (Matt Denny kick), Cleveland 62–61
- Utah – (0:42) Alvance Robinson 4-yard pass from Todd Hammel (Todd Hammel pass), Utah 69–62
- Cleveland – (0:21) Dominick Goodman 35-yard pass from Troy Weatherhead (Matt Denny kick), Tied 69–69
- Utah – (0:04) Justin Ore 29-yard pass from Todd Hammel (Kyle Brotzman kick), Utah 76–69

Passing

- Utah – Todd Hammel: 31/44, 355 yards, 7 TD, 1 INT
- Cleveland – Troy Weatherhead: 10/14, 178 yards, 4 TD

Rushing

- Utah – Ben Stallings: 9 att, 53 yards, 2 TD
- Cleveland – Russell Monk: 5 att, 15 yards, 1 TD

Receiving

- Utah – Alvance Robinson: 9 rec, 117 yards, 4 TD
- Cleveland – Dominick Goodman: 12 rec, 144 yards, 4 TD
