= 2011 San Jose SaberCats season =

Arena Football League team season

- Head coach: Darren Arbet
- Home stadium: HP Pavilion at San Jose

Results
- Record: 7–11
- Division place: 4th NC West
- Playoffs: Did not qualify

The 2011 San Jose SaberCats season was the 15th season for the franchise in the Arena Football League. The team was coached by Darren Arbet and played their home games at HP Pavilion at San Jose. This was the first season for the SaberCats since 2008, after the league went on hiatus in 2009 and the franchise wasn't active in 2010.

== Standings ==
West Division
| Team | W | L | PCT | PF | PA | DIV | CON | Home | Away |
| z-Arizona Rattlers | 16 | 2 | .889 | 1114 | 836 | 5–1 | 9–2 | 8–1 | 8–1 |
| x-Spokane Shock | 9 | 9 | .500 | 1057 | 1027 | 3–3 | 6–5 | 7–2 | 2–7 |
| Utah Blaze | 9 | 9 | .500 | 1082 | 1117 | 2–4 | 4–7 | 7–2 | 2–7 |
| San Jose SaberCats | 7 | 11 | .389 | 1022 | 1080 | 2–4 | 4–7 | 6–3 | 1–8 |

z - Clinched division and conference's best record
x - Clinched playoff berth

== Regular season schedule ==
The SaberCats began the season at home against the Spokane Shock on March 11. On July 23 they played their final regular season game on the road against the Tampa Bay Storm.

| Week | Day | Date | Kickoff | Opponent | Results | | Location | Report |
| Week | Day | Date | Kickoff | Opponent | Score | Record | Location | Report |
|---|---|---|---|---|---|---|---|---|
| 1 | Friday | March 11 | 7:30 p.m. PST | Spokane Shock | W 76–48 | 1–0 | HP Pavilion at San Jose | |
| 2 | Friday | March 18 | 7:30 p.m. PDT | Kansas City Command | W 60–57 | 2–0 | HP Pavilion at San Jose | |
| 3 | Friday | March 25 | 5:30 p.m. PDT | at Chicago Rush | L 41–54 | 2–1 | Allstate Arena | |
| 4 | Friday | April 1 | 7:30 p.m. PDT | Iowa Barnstormers | L 69–76 | 2–2 | HP Pavilion at San Jose | |
| 5 | Friday | April 8 | 7:30 p.m. PDT | Utah Blaze | W 75–55 | 3–2 | HP Pavilion at San Jose | |
| 6 | Saturday | April 16 | 5:00 p.m. PDT | at Tulsa Talons | W 42–33 | 4–2 | BOK Center | |
| 7 | Friday | April 22 | 7:30 p.m. PDT | Philadelphia Soul | W 68–61 | 5–2 | HP Pavilion at San Jose | |
| 8 | Bye | | | | | | | |
| 9 | Saturday | May 7 | 7:30 p.m. PDT | Arizona Rattlers | L 43–65 | 5–3 | HP Pavilion at San Jose | |
| 10 | Saturday | May 14 | 4:30 p.m. PDT | at Pittsburgh Power | L 48–54 | 5–4 | Consol Energy Center | |
| 11 | Saturday | May 21 | 2:00 p.m. PDT | at Utah Blaze | L 68–76 | 5–5 | EnergySolutions Arena | |
| 12 | Saturday | May 28 | 7:30 p.m. PDT | Georgia Force | L 49–55 | 5–6 | HP Pavilion at San Jose | |
| 13 | Saturday | June 4 | 5:30 p.m. PDT | at Dallas Vigilantes | L 57–70 | 5–7 | American Airlines Center | |
| 14 | Bye | | | | | | | |
| 15 | Saturday | June 18 | 5:05 p.m. PDT | at Arizona Rattlers | L 57–64 | 5–8 | US Airways Center | |
| 16 | Saturday | June 25 | 4:00 p.m. PDT | at Cleveland Gladiators | L 21–82 | 5–9 | Quicken Loans Arena | |
| 17 | Friday | July 1 | 7:30 p.m. PDT | Jacksonville Sharks | W 83–70 | 6–9 | HP Pavilion at San Jose | |
| 18 | Saturday | July 9 | 7:30 p.m. EDT | Orlando Predators | W 60–40 | 7–9 | HP Pavilion at San Jose | |
| 19 | Saturday | July 16 | 7:00 p.m. PDT | at Spokane Shock | L 61–63 | 7–10 | Spokane Veterans Memorial Arena | |
| 20 | Saturday | July 23 | 4:30 p.m. PDT | at Tampa Bay Storm | L 44–57 | 7–11 | St. Pete Times Forum | |

== Regular season ==
=== Week 1: vs. Spokane Shock ===
Week 1: Spokane Shock at San Jose SaberCats – Game summary

| Quarter | 1 | 2 | 3 | 4 | Total |
|---|---|---|---|---|---|
| Shock | 14 | 13 | 7 | 14 | 48 |
| SaberCats | 27 | 21 | 7 | 21 | 76 |

at HP Pavilion at San Jose, San Jose, California

- Date: March 11
- Game time: 7:30 p.m. PST
- Game attendance: 10,563
- Referee: David Cutaia
- Recap

Game information

1st quarter

- San Jose – (13:29) Rodney Wright 25-yard pass from Mark Grieb (Juan Gamboa kick), San Jose 7–0
- San Jose – (10:59) Courtney Smith 16-yard interception return (Juan Gamboa kick), San Jose 14–0
- Spokane – (8:04) Markee White 2-yard pass from Kyle Rowley (Taylor Rowan kick), San Jose 14–7
- San Jose – (5:55) Nichir Flowers 7-yard pass from Mark Grieb (Juan Gamboa kick blocked), San Jose 20–7
- Spokane – (1:30) Markee White 24-yard pass from Kyle Rowley (Taylor Rowan kick), San Jose 20–14
- San Jose – (0:20) Samora Goodson 25-yard pass from Mark Grieb (Juan Gamboa kick), San Jose 27–14

2nd quarter

- San Jose – (10:56) Dwight Mclean 46-yard interception return (Juan Gamboa kick), San Jose 34–14
- San Jose – (2:42) Chad Cook 1-yard run (Juan Gamboa kick), San Jose 41–14
- Spokane – (1:46) Terran Sanders 56-yard kickoff return (Kyle Rowley run failed), San Jose 41–20
- San Jose – (0:45) Nichir Flowers 8-yard pass from Mark Grieb (Juan Gamboa kick), San Jose 48–20
- Spokane – (0:02) Kyle Rowley 1-yard run (Taylor Rowan kick), San Jose 48–27

3rd quarter

- Spokane – (13:00 Raul Vijil 25-yard pass from Kyle Rowley (Taylor Rowan kick), San Jose 48–34
- San Jose – (7:17) Chad Cook 1-yard run (Juan Gamboa kick), San Jose 55–34

4th quarter

- San Jose – (14:57) Chad Cook 1-yard run (Juan Gamboa kick), San Jose 62–34
- Spokane – (10:52) Greg Orton 2-yard pass from Kyle Rowley (Taylor Rowan kick), San Jose 62–41
- San Jose – (9:58) Nichir Flowers 5-yard pass from Mark Grieb (Juan Gamboa kick), San Jose 69–41
- Spokane – (7:03) Greg Orton 29-yard pass from Kyle Rowley (Taylor Rowan kick), San Jose 69–48
- San Jose – (4:39) Nichir Flowers 9-yard pass from Mark Grieb (Juan Gamboa kick), San Jose 76–48

Passing

- Spokane – Kyle Rowley: 30/47, 364 yards, 5 TD, 3 INT
- San Jose – Mark Grieb: 21/25, 222 yards, 6 TD

Rushing

- Spokane – Kyle Rowley: 1 att, 1 yard, 1 TD
- San Jose – Chad Cook: 11 att, 21 yards, 3 TD

Receiving

- Spokane – Raul Vijil: 13 rec, 161 yards, 1 TD
- San Jose – Rodney Wright: 12 rec, 123 yards, 1 TD

=== Week 2: vs. Kansas City Command ===
Week 2: Kansas City Command at San Jose SaberCats – Game summary

| Quarter | 1 | 2 | 3 | 4 | Total |
|---|---|---|---|---|---|
| Command | 6 | 22 | 14 | 15 | 57 |
| SaberCats | 14 | 20 | 9 | 17 | 60 |

at HP Pavilion at San Jose, San Jose, California

- Date: March 18
- Game time: 7:30 p.m. PDT
- Game attendance: 9,563
- Referee: Shawn Hochuli
- Recap

Game information

1st quarter

- San Jose – (12:56) Nicherin Flowers 9-yard pass from Mark Grieb (Juan Gamboa kick), San Jose 7–0
- San Jose – (5:42) Samora Goodson 27-yard pass from Mark Grieb (Juan Gamboa kick), San Jose 14–0
- Kansas City – (2:48) Steven Savoy 32-yard pass from J.J. Raterink (Mike Salerno kick failed), San Jose 14–6

2nd quarter

- San Jose – (5:29) Chad Cook 1-yard run (Juan Gamboa kick), San Jose 21–6
- Kansas City – (1:50) Bret Smith 33-yard pass from J.J. Raterink (Mike Salerno kick), San Jose 21–13
- San Jose – (0:59) Rodney Wright 58-yard kickoff return (Juan Gamboa kick), San Jose 28–13
- Kansas City – (0:31) Steven Savoy 14-yard pass from J.J. Raterink (Steven Savoy rush), San Jose 28–21
- San Jose – (0:20) Rodney Wright 38-yard pass from Mark Grieb (Juan Gamboa kick failed), San Jose 34–21
- Kansas City – (0:02) Bret Smith 19-yard pass from J.J. Raterink (Mike Salerno kick), San Jose 34–28

3rd quarter

- Kansas City – (12:56) Bradley Chavez 30-yard pass from J.J. Raterink (Mike Salerno kick), Kansas City 35–34
- San Jose – (10:30) Nicherin Flowers 11-yard pass from Mark Grieb (Juan Gamboa kick failed), San Jose 40–35
- Kansas City – (4:58) Bradley Chavez 18-yard pass from J.J. Raterink (Mike Salerno kick), Kansas City 42–40
- San Jose – (1:12) Juan Gamboa 17-yard field goal, San Jose 43–42

4th quarter

- Kansas City – (12:37) Christian Wise 10-yard pass from J.J. Raterink (J.J. Raterink pass), Kansas City 50–43
- San Jose – (6:49) Chad Cook 2-yard run (Juan Gamboa kick failed), Kansas City 50–49
- San Jose – (0:53) Mark Grieb 2-yard run (Mark Grieb pass), San Jose 57–50
- Kansas City – (0:39) Bradley Chavez 35-yard pass from J.J. Raterink (Mike Salerno kick), Tied 57–57
- San Jose – (0:02) Juan Gamboa 18-yard field goal, San Jose 60–57

Passing

- Kansas City – J.J. Raterink: 28/45, 364 yards, 8 TD, 1 INT
- San Jose – Mark Grieb: 27/39, 340 yards, 4 TD

Rushing

- Kansas City – J.J. Raterink: 4 att, 8 yards
- San Jose – Chad Cook: 4 att, 6 yards, 2 TD

Receiving

- Kansas City – Bret Smith: 12 rec, 132 yards, 2 TD
- San Jose – Samora Goodson: 8 rec, 144 yards, 1 TD

=== Week 3: at Chicago Rush ===
Week 3: San Jose SaberCats at Chicago Rush – Game summary

| Quarter | 1 | 2 | 3 | 4 | Total |
|---|---|---|---|---|---|
| SaberCats | 8 | 13 | 7 | 13 | 41 |
| Rush | 6 | 14 | 20 | 14 | 54 |

at Allstate Arena, Rosemont, Illinois

- Date: March 25
- Game time: 7:30 p.m. CDT
- Game attendance: 7,466
- Referee: Tony Cannella
- Recap

Game information

1st quarter

- Chicago – (12:13) Reggie Gray 46-yard pass from Russ Michna (Vic Hall pass intercepted), Chicago 6–0
- San Jose – (12:13) Dwight Mclean PAT return, Chicago 6–2
- San Jose – (6:29) Mark Lewis 13-yard pass from Mark Grieb (Juan Gamboa kick failed), San Jose 8–6

2nd quarter

- San Jose – (9:46) Chad Cook 1-yard run (Juan Gamboa kick failed), San Jose 14–6
- Chicago – (7:16) Russ Michna 17-yard run (Chris Gould kick), San Jose 14–13
- San Jose – (3:43) Chad Cook 1-yard run (Juan Gamboa kick), San Jose 21–13
- Chicago – (2:37) Reggie Gray 39-yard pass from Russ Michna (Chris Gould kick), San Jose 21–20

3rd quarter

- Chicago – (12:03) Reggie Gray 22-yard pass from Russ Michna (Chris Gould kick failed), Chicago 26–21
- Chicago – (7:40) Russ Michna 7-yard run (Chris Gould kick), Chicago 33–21
- San Jose – (6:10) Rodney Wright 5-yard pass from Mark Grieb (Juan Gamboa kick), Chicago 33–28
- Chicago – (3:44) Charles Dillon 7-yard pass from Russ Michna (Chris Gould kick), Chicago 40–28

4th quarter

- San Jose – (13:58) Gabe Nyenhuis 7-yard interception return (Juan Gamboa kick), Chicago 40–35
- Chicago – (12:58) Micah Rucker 4-yard pass from Russ Michna (Chris Gould kick), Chicago 47–35
- San Jose – (10:47) Samora Goodson 10-yard pass from Mark Grieb (Juan Gamboa kick failed), Chicago 47–41
- Chicago – (4:41) Johnie Kirton 1-yard run (Chris Gould kick), Chicago 54–41

Passing

- San Jose – Mark Grieb: 28/46, 279 yards, 3 TD, 3 INT
- Chicago – Russ Michna: 15/21, 229 yards, 5 TD, 1 INT

Rushing

- San Jose – Chad Cook: 3 att, 6 yards, 2 TD
- Chicago – Russ Michna: 9 att, 38 yards, 2 TD

Receiving

- San Jose – Rodney Wright: 15 rec, 143 yards, 1 TD
- Chicago – Reggie Gray: 8 rec, 149 yards, 3 TD

=== Week 4: vs. Iowa Barnstormers ===
Week 4: Iowa Barnstormers at San Jose SaberCats – Game summary

| Quarter | 1 | 2 | 3 | 4 | Total |
|---|---|---|---|---|---|
| Barnstormers | 13 | 21 | 14 | 28 | 76 |
| SaberCats | 14 | 20 | 14 | 21 | 69 |

at HP Pavilion at San Jose, San Jose, California

- Date: April 1
- Game time: 7:30 p.m. PDT
- Game attendance: 9,163
- Referee: David Cutaia
- Recap

Game information

1st quarter

- San Jose – (13:54) Nicherin Flowers 17-yard pass from Mark Grieb (Juan Gamboa kick), San Jose 7–0
- Iowa – (10:22) Jesse Schmidt 5-yard pass from Brad Banks (Phil Marfuggi kick), Tied 7–7
- Iowa – (6:37) Todd Blythe 8-yard pass from Brad Banks (Phil Marfuggi kick failed), Iowa 13–7
- San Jose – (2:21) Nicherin Flowers 3-yard pass from Mark Grieb (Juan Gamboa kick), San Jose 14–13

2nd quarter

- Iowa – (14:12) Todd Blythe 20-yard pass from Brad Banks (Phil Marfuggi kick failed), Iowa 19–14
- San Jose – (11:30) Chad Cook 18-yard pass from Mark Grieb (Juan Gamboa kick), San Jose 21–19
- Iowa – (7:22) Jesse Schmidt 4-yard pass from Brad Banks (Brad Banks pass), Iowa 27–21
- San Jose – (4:44) Samora Goodson 23-yard pass from Mark Grieb (Juan Gamboa kick), San Jose 28–27
- Iowa – (2:48) Jesse Schmidt 9-yard pass from Brad Banks (Phil Marfuggi kick), Iowa 34–28
- San Jose – (0:02) Mark Lewis 2-yard pass from Mark Grieb (Juan Gamboa kick failed), Tied 34–34

3rd quarter

- Iowa – (14:23) Todd Blythe 11-yard pass from Brad Banks (Phil Marfuggi kick), Iowa 41–34
- San Jose – (9:46) Nicherin Flowers 16-yard pass from Mark Grieb (Juan Gamboa kick), Tied 41–41
- Iowa – (7:22) Jesse Schmidt 15-yard pass from Brad Banks (Phil Marfuggi kick), Iowa 48–41
- San Jose – (2:13) Chad Cook 4-yard run (Juan Gamboa kick), Tied 48–48

4th quarter

- Iowa – (14:22) Jesse Schmidt 18-yard pass from Brad Banks (Phil Marfuggi kick), Iowa 55–48
- San Jose – (13:15) Burt Toler 47-yard pass from Mark Grieb (Juan Gamboa kick), Tied 55–55
- Iowa – (10:05) Todd Blythe 38-yard pass from Brad Banks (Phil Marfuggi kick), Iowa 62–55
- San Jose – (9:15) Nicherin Flowers 19-yard pass from Mark Grieb (Juan Gamboa kick), Tied 62–62
- Iowa – (7:26) Jesse Schmidt 42-yard pass from Brad Banks (Phil Marfuggi kick), Iowa 69–62
- Iowa – (0:50) Brad Banks 7-yard run (Phil Marfuggi kick), Iowa 76–62
- San Jose – (0:28) Samora Goodson 8-yard pass from Mark Grieb (Juan Gamboa kick), Iowa 76–69

Passing

- Iowa – Brad Banks: 24/37, 383 yards, 10 TD
- San Jose – Mark Grieb: 33/47, 391 yards, 9 TD, 1 INT

Rushing

- Iowa – Brad Banks: 4 att, 17 yards, 1 TD
- San Jose – Chad Cook: 1 att, 4 yards, 1 TD

Receiving

- Iowa – Jesse Schmidt: 13 rec, 183 yards, 6 TD
- San Jose – Samora Goodson: 10 rec, 131 yards, 2 TD

=== Week 5: vs. Utah Blaze ===
Week 5: Utah Blaze at San Jose SaberCats – Game summary

| Quarter | 1 | 2 | 3 | 4 | Total |
|---|---|---|---|---|---|
| Blaze | 14 | 14 | 6 | 21 | 55 |
| SaberCats | 14 | 26 | 7 | 28 | 75 |

at HP Pavilion at San Jose, San Jose, California

- Date: April 8
- Game time: 7:30 p.m. PDT
- Game attendance: 8,763
- Referee: Shawn Hochuli
- Recap

Game information

1st quarter

- San Jose – (12:38) Chad Cook 3-yard run (Juan Gamboa kick), San Jose 7–0
- Utah – (9:54) Ernest Pierce 14-yard pass from Tommy Grady (Greg Gunderson kick), Tied 7–7
- San Jose – (7:50) Nicherin Flowers 3-yard run (Juan Gamboa kick), San Jose 14–7
- Utah – (1:18) Ben Stallings 2-yard run (Greg Gunderson kick), Tied 14–14

2nd quarter

- San Jose – (13:10) Samora Goodson 8-yard pass from Mark Grieb (Juan Gamboa kick blocked), San Jose 20–14
- Utah – (9:03) Aaron Boone 10-yard pass from Tommy Grady (Greg Gunderson kick), Utah 21–20
- San Jose – (5:12) Nicherin Flowers 5-yard pass from Mark Grieb (Juan Gamboa kick failed), San Jose 26–21
- Utah – (3:58) Alvance Robinson 35-yard pass from Tommy Grady (Greg Gunderson kick), Utah 28–26
- San Jose – (2:02) Chad Cook 2-yard run (Juan Gamboa kick), San Jose 33–28
- San Jose – (0:09) Samora Goodson 2-yard pass from Mark Grieb (Juan Gamboa kick), San Jose 40–28

3rd quarter

- San Jose – (10:07) Samora Goodson 9-yard pass from Mark Grieb (Juan Gamboa kick), San Jose 47–28
- Utah – (7:42) Aaron Boone 40-yard pass from Tommy Grady (Greg Gunderson kick failed), San Jose 47–34

4th quarter

- Utah – (14:56) Aaron Boone 10-yard pass from Tommy Grady (Greg Gunderson kick), San Jose 47–41
- San Jose – (11:48) Samora Goodson 9-yard pass from Mark Grieb (Juan Gamboa kick), San Jose 54–41
- San Jose – (3:17) Chido Nwokocha 30-yard pass from Mark Grieb (Juan Gamboa kick), San Jose 61–41
- Utah – (0:42) Ernest Pierce 2-yard pass from Tommy Grady (Greg Gunderson kick), San Jose 61–48
- San Jose – (0:35) Chad Cook 13-yard run (Juan Gamboa kick), San Jose 68–48
- Utah – (0:28) Alvance Robinson 55-yard kickoff return (Greg Gunderson kick), San Jose 68–55
- San Jose – (0:17) Chad Cook 9-yard run (Juan Gamboa kick), San Jose 75–55

Passing

- Utah – Tommy Grady: 27/48, 321 yards, 6 TD, 1 INT
- San Jose – Mark Grieb: 25/33, 279 yards, 6 TD

Rushing

- Utah – Tommy Grady: 1 att, 12 yards
- San Jose – Chad Cook: 6 att, 33 yards, 4 TD

Receiving

- Utah – Aaron Boone: 11 rec, 147 yards, 3 TD
- San Jose – Samora Goodson: 11 rec, 113 yards, 4 TD

=== Week 6: at Tulsa Talons ===
Week 6: San Jose SaberCats at Tulsa Talons – Game summary

| Quarter | 1 | 2 | 3 | 4 | Total |
|---|---|---|---|---|---|
| SaberCats | 7 | 7 | 21 | 7 | 42 |
| Talons | 14 | 10 | 3 | 6 | 33 |

at BOK Center, Tulsa, Oklahoma

- Date: April 16
- Game time: 5:00 p.m. PDT
- Game attendance: 4,747
- Referee: Steve Strimling
- Recap

Game information

1st quarter

- Tulsa – (10:16) Darrell Davis 3-yard pass from Matt Bassunener (Juan Bongarra kick), Tulsa 7–0
- Tulsa – (3:58) Troy McBroom 8-yard pass from Matt Bassuener (Juan Bongarra kick), Tulsa 14–0
- San Jose – (2:45) Nicherin Flowers 29-yard pass from Mark Grieb (Juan Gamboa kick), Tulsa 14–7

2nd quarter

- Tulsa – (9:42) Al Hunt 8-yard pass from Matt Bassuener (Juan Bongarra kick), Tulsa 21–7
- San Jose – (2:40) Samora Goodson 9-yard pass from Mark Grieb (Juan Gamboa kick), Tulsa 21–14
- Tulsa – (0:29) Juan Bongarra 26-yard field goal, Tulsa 24–14

3rd quarter

- San Jose – (12:33) Samora Goodson 25-yard pass from Mark Grieb (Juan Gamboa kick), Tulsa 24–21
- San Jose – (11:01) Chad Cook 2-yard run (Juan Gamboa kick), San Jose 28–24
- Tulsa – (4:07) Juan Bongarra 29-yard field goal, San Jose 28–27
- San Jose – (0:56) Samora Goodson 7-yard pass from Mark Grieb (Juan Gamboa kick), San Jose 35–27

4th quarter

- Tulsa – (7:54) Troy McBroom 6-yard pass from Matt Bassuener (Matt Bassuener pass failed), San Jose 35–33
- San Jose – (2:05) Chad Cook 3-yard run (Juan Gamboa kick), San Jose 42–33

Passing

- San Jose – Mark Grieb: 25/32, 302 yards, 4 TD, 2 INT
- Tulsa – Matt Bassuener: 22/43, 265 yards, 4 TD, 2 INT

Rushing

- San Jose – Chad Cook: 7 att, 19 yards, 2 TD
- Tulsa – Matt Bassuener: 4 att, 10 yards

Receiving

- San Jose – Samora Goodson: 10 rec, 145 yards, 3 TD
- Tulsa – Troy McBroom: 13 rec, 177 yards, 2 TD

=== Week 7: vs. Philadelphia Soul ===
Week 7: Philadelphia Soul at San Jose SaberCats – Game summary

| Quarter | 1 | 2 | 3 | 4 | Total |
|---|---|---|---|---|---|
| Soul | 7 | 13 | 7 | 34 | 61 |
| SaberCats | 14 | 17 | 14 | 23 | 68 |

at HP Pavilion at San Jose, San Jose, California

- Date: April 22
- Game time: 7:30 p.m. PDT
- Game attendance: 8,663
- Referee: David Cutaia
- Recap

Game information

1st quarter

- San Jose – (10:30) Chad Cook 4-yard run (Juan Gamboa kick), San Jose 7–0
- Philadelphia – (3:34) Donovan Morgan 3-yard pass from Justin Allgood (Massimo Scaccia kick), Tied 7–7
- San Jose – (1:29) Nichiren Flowers 27-yard pass from Mark Grieb (Juan Gamboa kick), San Jose 14–7

2nd quarter

- Philadelphia – (11:52) Daniel Ross 3-yard run (Massimo Scaccia kick failed), San Jose 14–13
- San Jose – (10:52) Chido Nwokocha 45-yard pass from Mark Grieb (Juan Gamboa kick), San Jose 21–13
- Philadelphia – (6:37) Keith Stokes 0-yard fumble recovery (Massimo Scaccia kick), San Jose 21–20
- San Jose – (1:55) Nichiren Flowers 1-yard run (Juan Gamboa kick), San Jose 28–20
- San Jose – (0:13) Juan Gamboa 38-yard field goal, San Jose 31–20

3rd quarter

- San Jose – (10:57) Nichiren Flowers 6-yard pass from Mark Grieb (Juan Gamboa kick), San Jose 38–20
- San Jose – (9:37) Jamario O'Neal 10-yard interception return (Juan Gamboa kick), San Jose 45–20
- Philadelphia – (1:57) Keith Stokes 11-yard pass from Ryan Vena (Massimo Scaccia kick), San Jose 45–27

4th quarter

- San Jose – (14:51) Chido Nwokocha 17-yard pass from Mark Grieb (Juan Gamboa kick), San Jose 52–27
- Philadelphia – (10:50) Syvelle Newton 5-yard pass from Ryan Vena (Massimo Scaccia kick), San Jose 52–34
- San Jose – (7:59) Chad Cook 3-yard run (Juan Gamboa kick), San Jose 59–34
- Philadelphia – (6:29) Donovan Morgan 45-yard pass from Ryan Vena (Massimo Scaccia kick), San Jose 59–41
- San Jose – (3:23) Juan Gamboa 16-yard field goal, San Jose 62–41
- Philadelphia – (2:03) Syvelle Newton 45-yard pass from Ryan Vena (Massimo Scaccia kick), San Jose 62–48
- Philadelphia – (0:47) Ryan Vena 4-yard run (Massimo Scaccia kick failed), San Jose 62–54
- San Jose – (0:19) Mark Grieb 4-yard run (Juan Gamboa kick failed), San Jose 69–54
- Philadelphia – (0:00) Keith Stokes 25-yard pass from Ryan Vena (Massimo Scaccia kick), San Jose 69–61

Passing

- Philadelphia – Ryan Vena: 12/16, 217 yards, 5 TD, 1 INT
- San Jose – Mark Grieb: 18/28, 221 yards, 4 TD, 1 INT

Rushing

- Philadelphia – Ryan Vena: 1 att, 4 yards, 1 TD
- San Jose – Chad Cook: 4 att, 11 yards, 2 TD

Receiving

- Philadelphia – Donovan Morgan: 11 rec, 163 yards, 2 TD
- San Jose – Chido Nwokocha: 5 rec, 75 yards, 2 TD

=== Week 9: vs. Arizona Rattlers ===
Week 9: Arizona Rattlers at San Jose SaberCats – Game summary

| Quarter | 1 | 2 | 3 | 4 | Total |
|---|---|---|---|---|---|
| Rattlers | 14 | 14 | 3 | 34 | 65 |
| SaberCats | 13 | 7 | 7 | 16 | 43 |

at HP Pavilion at San Jose, San Jose, California

- Date: May 7
- Game time: 7:30 p.m. PDT
- Game attendance: 9,499
- Referee: Steve Strimling
- Recap

Game information

1st quarter

- Arizona – (14:25) Trandon Harvey 26-yard pass from Nick Davila (Fabrizio Scaccia kick), Arizona 7–0
- San Jose – (11:03) Otis Amey 4-yard pass from Mark Grieb (Juan Gamboa kick failed), Arizona 7–6
- Arizona – (8:35) Trandon Harvey 13-yard pass from Nick Davila (Fabrizio Scaccia kick), Arizona 14–6
- San Jose – (0:26) Chad Cook 5-yard run (Juan Gamboa kick), Arizona 14–13

2nd quarter

- Arizona – (12:01) Rod Windsor 14-yard pass from Nick Davila (Fabrizio Scaccia kick), Arizona 21–13
- San Jose – (4:27) Mark Grieb 9-yard run (Juan Gamboa kick), Arizona 21–20
- Arizona – (0:24) Odie Armstrong 1-yard run (Fabrizio Scaccia kick), Arizona 28–20

3rd quarter

- Arizona – (8:16) Fabrizio Scaccia 38-yard field goal, Arizona 31–20
- San Jose – (1:49) Ben Nelson 17-yard pass from Mark Grieb (Juan Gamboa kick), Arizona 31–27

4th quarter

- Arizona – (12:51) Jason Geathers 9-yard pass from Nick Davila (Fabrizio Scaccia kick), Arizona 38–27
- San Jose – (10:22) Ben Nelson 31-yard pass from Mark Grieb (Juan Gamboa kick), Arizona 38–34
- Arizona – (9:14) Rod Windsor 43-yard pass from Nick Davila (Fabrizio Scaccia kick), Arizona 45–34
- San Jose – (6:44) Otis Amey 45-yard pass from Mark Grieb (Juan Gamboa kick), Arizona 45–41
- Arizona – (4:22) Jason Geathers 17-yard pass from Nick Davila (Fabrizio Scaccia kick blocked), Arizona 51–41
- San Jose – (4:22) Mervin Brookins PAT return, Arizona 51–43
- Arizona – (0:23) Kevin McCullough 2-yard net recovery (Fabrizio Scaccia kick), Arizona 58–43
- Arizona – (0:10) Kevin McCullough 11-yard interception return (Fabrizio Scaccia kick), Arizona 65–43

Passing

- Arizona – Nick Davila: 23/32, 266 yards, 6 TD
- San Jose – Mark Grieb: 20/38, 264 yards, 4 TD, 4 INT

Rushing

- Arizona – Odie Armstrong: 5 att, 41 yards, 1 TD
- San Jose – Mark Grieb: 2 att, 11 yards, 1 TD

Receiving

- Arizona – Rod Windsor: 9 rec, 110 yards, 2 TD
- San Jose – Amey Otis: 6 rec, 109 yards, 2 TD

=== Week 10: at Pittsburgh Power ===
Week 10: San Jose SaberCats at Pittsburgh Power – Game summary

| Quarter | 1 | 2 | 3 | 4 | Total |
|---|---|---|---|---|---|
| SaberCats | 21 | 13 | 14 | 0 | 48 |
| Power | 14 | 19 | 7 | 14 | 54 |

at Consol Energy Center, Pittsburgh, Pennsylvania

- Date: May 14
- Game time: 4:30 p.m. PDT
- Game attendance: 7,333
- Referee: Tom McCabe
- Recap

Game information

1st quarter

- Pittsburgh – (11:18) Jason Willis 15-yard pass from Bernard Morris (Paul Edinger kick), Pittsburgh 7–0
- Pittsburgh – (7:20) Michael Washington 13-yard pass from Bernard Morris (Paul Edinger kick), Pittsburgh 14–0
- San Jose – (4:58) Ben Nelson 11-yard pass from Mark Grieb (Juan Gamboa kick), San Jose 14–7
- San Jose – (3:26) Chad Cook 5-yard run (Juan Gamboa kick), Tied 14–14
- San Jose – (1:00) James Roe 6-yard pass from Mark Grieb (Juan Gamboa kick), San Jose 21–14

2nd quarter

- Pittsburgh – (10:48) Jason Willis 14-yard pass from Bernard Morris (Paul Edinger kick failed), San Jose 21–20
- San Jose – (8:16) James Roe 15-yard pass from Mark Grieb (Juan Gamboa failed), San Jose 27–20
- Pittsburgh – (6:16) Michael Washington 22-yard pass from Bernard Morris (Paul Edinger kick failed), San Jose 27–26
- San Jose – (2:00) Chad Cook 2-yard run (Juan Gamboa kick), San Jose 34–26
- Pittsburgh – (0:55) Michael Washington 4-yard pass from Bernard Morris (Paul Edinger kick), San Jose 34–33

3rd quarter

- San Jose – (10:13) Chad Cook 3-yard run (Juan Gamboa kick), San Jose 41–33
- Pittsburgh – (6:24) Lonnell Dewalt 9-yard pass from Bernard Morris (Paul Edinger kick), San Jose 41–40
- San Jose – (1:46) Burl Toler 11-yard pass from Mark Grieb (Juan Gamboa kick), San Jose 48–40

4th quarter

- Pittsburgh – (2:30) Michael Washington 18-yard pass from Bernard Morris (Bernard Morris pass failed), San Jose 48–46
- Pittsburgh – (0:14) Jason Willis 31-yard pass from Bernard Morris (Bernard Morris pass), Pittsburgh 54–48

Passing

- San Jose – Mark Grieb: 27/41, 294 yards, 4 TD, 1 INT
- Pittsburgh – Bernard Morris: 24/39, 263 yards, 8 TD, 2 INT

Rushing

- San Jose – Chad Cook: 13 att, 63 yards, 3 TD
- Pittsburgh – Bernard Morris: 4 att, 29 yards

Receiving

- San Jose – Burl Toler: 8 rec, 77 yards, 1 TD
- Pittsburgh – Michael Washington: 12 rec, 120 yards, 4 TD

=== Week 11: at Utah Blaze ===
Week 11: San Jose SaberCats at Utah Blaze – Game summary

| Quarter | 1 | 2 | 3 | 4 | Total |
|---|---|---|---|---|---|
| SaberCats | 14 | 21 | 20 | 13 | 68 |
| Blaze | 21 | 14 | 14 | 27 | 76 |

at EnergySolutions Arena, Salt Lake City, Utah

- Date: May 21
- Game time: 2:00 p.m. PDT
- Game attendance: 8,815
- Referee: Shawn Anderson
- Recap

Game information

1st quarter

- Utah – (11:48) Ernie Pierce 10-yard pass from Tommy Grady (Andrew Aguila kick), Utah 7–0
- San Jose – (10:40) Ben Nelson 13-yard pass from Mark Grieb (Juan Gamboa kick), Tied 7–7
- Utah – (9:15) Chris Bocage 20-yard pass from Tommy Grady (Andrew Aguila kick), Utah 14–7
- San Jose – (4:37) Chad Cook 4-yard run (Juan Gamboa kick), Tied 14–14
- Utah – (1:49) Alvance Robinson 14-yard pass from Tommy Grady (Andrew Aguila kick), Utah 21–14

2nd quarter

- San Jose – (8:48) Chad Cook 1-yard run (Juan Gamboa kick), Tied 21–21
- Utah – (7:17) Chris Bocage 7-yard pass from Tommy Grady (Andrew Aguila kick), Utah 28–21
- San Jose – (3:26) Ben Nelson 9-yard pass from Mark Grieb (Juan Gamboa kick), Tied 28–28
- Utah – (0:50) Chris Bocage 13-yard pass from Tommy Grady (Andrew Aguila kick), Utah 35–28
- San Jose – (0:04) Burl Toler 9-yard pass from Mark Grieb (Juan Gamboa kick), Tied 35–35

3rd quarter

- San Jose – (11:40) Mervin Brookins 21-yard pass from Mark Grieb (Juan Gamboa kick failed), San Jose 41–35
- Utah – (9:18) Ernie Pierce 23-yard pass from Tommy Grady (Andrew Aguila kick), Utah 42–41
- San Jose – (4:55) Mervin Brookins 23-yard pass from Mark Grieb (Juan Gamboa kick), San Jose 48–42
- Utah – (4:03) Chris Bocage 56-yard kickoff return (Andrew Aguila kick), Utah 49–48
- San Jose – (0:26) Chad Cook 3-yard run (Juan Gamboa kick), San Jose 55–49

4th quarter

- Utah – (13:00) Ernie Pierce 18-yard pass from Tommy Grady (Andrew Aguila kick), Utah 56–55
- Utah – (8:25) Jason Boone 3-yard pass from Tommy Grady (Andrew Aguila kick failed), Utah 62–55
- San Jose – (4:53) Ben Nelson 23-yard pass from Mark Grieb (Juan Gamboa kick), Tied 62–62
- Utah – (3:42) Alvance Robinson 47-yard pass from Tommy Grady (Andrew Aguila kick), Utah 69–62
- San Jose – (0:29) Ben Nelson 6-yard pass from Mark Grieb (Juan Gamboa kick blocked), Utah 69–68
- Utah – (0:05) Tommy Grady 8-yard run (Andrew Aguila kick), Utah 76–68

Passing

- San Jose – Brett Elliott: 29/43, 329 yards, 7 TD, 1 INT
- Utah – Tommy Grady: 23/32, 319 yards, 9 TD

Rushing

- San Jose – Chad Cook: 7 att, 26 yards, 3 TD
- Utah – Tommy Grady: 2 att, 8 yards, 1 TD

Receiving

- San Jose – Mervin Brookins: 13 rec, 152 yards, 2 TD
- Utah – Ernie Pierce: 10 rec, 136 yards, 3 TD

=== Week 12: vs. Georgia Force ===
Week 12: Georgia Force at San Jose SaberCats – Game summary

| Quarter | 1 | 2 | 3 | 4 | Total |
|---|---|---|---|---|---|
| Force | 10 | 21 | 10 | 14 | 55 |
| SaberCats | 7 | 21 | 15 | 6 | 49 |

at HP Pavilion at San Jose, San Jose, California

- Date: May 28
- Game time: 7:30 p.m. PDT
- Game attendance: 10,231
- Referee: Shawn Hochuli
- Recap

Game information

1st quarter

- Georgia – (10:03) C.J. Johnson 47-yard pass from Brett Elliott (Carlos Martinez kick), Georgia 7–0
- San Jose – (7:15) Ben Nelson 8-yard pass from Mark Grieb (Juan Gamboa kick), Tied 7–7
- Georgia – (2:21) Carlos Martinez 25-yard field goal, Georgia 10–7

2nd quarter

- San Jose – (13:28) Chad Cook 1-yard run (Juan Gamboa kick), San Jose 14–10
- Georgia – (9:16) Larry Shipp 10-yard pass from Brett Elliott (Carlos Martinez kick), Georgia 17–14
- San Jose – (8:08) Mervin Brookins 42-yard pass from Mark Grieb (Juan Gamboa kick), San Jose 21–17
- Georgia – (3:03) Ben McDowell 1-yard run (Carlos Martinez kick), Georgia 24–21
- Georgia – (0:03) Brett Elliott 4-yard run (Carlos Martinez kick), Georgia 31–21
- San Jose – (0:00) Mervin Brookins 24-yard pass from Mark Grieb (Juan Gamboa kick), Georgia 31–28

3rd quarter

- Georgia – (11:09) Mike Johnson 8-yard pass from Brett Elliott (Carlos Martinez kick), Georgia 38–28
- San Jose – (9:35) Mervin Brookins 14-yard pass from Mark Grieb (Juan Gamboa kick), Georgia 38–35
- Georgia – (4:28) Carlos Martinez 47-yard field goal, Georgia 41–35
- San Jose – (1:40) Chad Cook 1-yard run (Juan Gamboa rush), San Jose 43–41

4th quarter

- Georgia – (14:17) Larry Shipp 13-yard pass from Brett Elliott (Carlos Martinez kick failed), Georgia 47–43
- San Jose – (10:30) Ben Nelson 12-yard pass from Mark Grieb (Juan Gamboa kick failed), San Jose 49–47
- Georgia – (0:29) Larry Shipp 16-yard pass from Brett Elliott (Brett Elliott pass), Georgia 55–49

Passing

- Georgia – Brett Elliott: 31/46, 368 yards, 5 TD
- San Jose – Mark Grieb: 24/34, 358 yards, 5 TD, 1 INT

Rushing

- Georgia – Brett Elliott: 1 att, 4 yards, 1 TD
- San Jose – Chad Cook: 8 att, 14 yards, 2 TD

Receiving

- Georgia – C.J. Johnson: 13 rec, 159 yards, 1 TD
- San Jose – Mervin Brookins: 9 rec, 136 yards, 3 TD

=== Week 13: at Dallas Vigilantes ===
Week 13: San Jose SaberCats at Dallas Vigilantes – Game summary

| Quarter | 1 | 2 | 3 | 4 | Total |
|---|---|---|---|---|---|
| SaberCats | 14 | 21 | 9 | 13 | 57 |
| Vigilantes | 28 | 21 | 14 | 7 | 70 |

at American Airlines Center, Dallas, Texas

- Date: June 4
- Game time: 5:30 p.m. PDT
- Game attendance: 8,463
- Referee: Chris Snead
- Recap

Game information

1st quarter

- Dallas – (12:17) DeAndrew Rubin 22-yard pass from Dan Raudabaugh (Remy Hamilton kick), Dallas 7–0
- San Jose – (11:08) Burl Toler 13-yard pass from Mark Grieb (Juan Gamboa kick), Tied 7–7
- Dallas – (8:43) Anthony Jones 0-yard fumble recovery (Remy Hamilton kick), Dallas 14–7
- Dallas – (6:30) Brendan Pahulu 17-yard interception return (Remy Hamilton kick), Dallas 21–7
- San Jose – (3:48) Ben Nelson 11-yard pass from Mark Grieb (Juan Gamboa kick), Dallas 21–14
- Dallas – (0:23) Derrick Ross 3-yard run (Remy Hamilton kick), Dallas 28–14

2nd quarter

- San Jose – (14:54) Ben Nelson 37-yard pass from Mark Grieb (Juan Gamboa kick), Dallas 28–21
- Dallas – (11:22) Derrick Ross 4-yard run (Remy Hamilton kick), Dallas 35–21
- San Jose – (6:15) Scott Schoettgen 15-yard pass from Mark Grieb (Juan Gamboa kick), Dallas 35–28
- Dallas – (5:00) Anthony Jones 17-yard pass from Dan Raudabaugh (Remy Hamilton kick), Dallas 42–28
- Dallas – (1:08) Chris Brown 20-yard interception return (Remy Hamilton kick), Dallas 49–28
- San Jose – (0:35) Scott Schoettgen 4-yard pass from Mark Grieb (Juan Gamboa kick), Dallas 49–35

3rd quarter

- San Jose – (10:44) Juan Gamboa 41-yard field goal, Dallas 49–38
- Dallas – (8:56) Anthony Jones 38-yard pass from Dan Raudabaugh (Remy Hamilton kick), Dallas 56–38
- San Jose – (6:43) Scott Schoettgen 14-yard pass from Mark Grieb (Juan Gamboa kick failed), Dallas 56–44
- Dallas – (4:44) Derrick Ross 1-yard run (Remy Hamilton kick), Dallas 63–44

4th quarter

- San Jose – (12:07) Ben Nelson 7-yard pass from McLeod Bethel-Thompson (Juan Gamboa kick), Dallas 63–51
- Dallas – (11:57) Anthony Jones 13-yard pass from Dan Raudabaugh (Remy Hamilton kick), Dallas 70–51
- San Jose – (0:54) Ben Nelson 24-yard pass from McLeod Bethel-Thompson (McLeod Bethel-Thompson pass failed), Dallas 70–57

Passing

- San Jose – Bernard Morris: 17/29, 217 yards, 6 TD, 2 INT
- Dallas – Dan Raudabaugh: 14/22, 193 yards, 4 TD, 1 INT

Rushing

- San Jose – Mervin Brookins: 1 att, 7 yards
- Dallas – Derrick Ross: 10 att, 67 yards, 3 TD

Receiving

- San Jose – Ben Nelson: 8 rec, 132 yards, 4 TD
- Dallas – Anthony Jones: 6 rec, 95 yards, 3 TD

=== Week 15: at Arizona Rattlers ===
Week 15: San Jose SaberCats at Arizona Rattlers – Game summary

| Quarter | 1 | 2 | 3 | 4 | Total |
|---|---|---|---|---|---|
| SaberCats | 7 | 28 | 14 | 8 | 57 |
| Rattlers | 14 | 21 | 7 | 22 | 64 |

at US Airways Center, Phoenix, Arizona

- Date: June 18
- Game time: 5:05 p.m. PDT
- Game attendance: 9,397
- Referee: Shane Anderson
- Recap

Game information

1st quarter

- Arizona – (8:07) Kerry Reed 12-yard pass from Nick Davila (Fabrizio Scaccia kick), Arizona 7–0
- San Jose – (7:08) Chris Vedder 56-yard kickoff return (Juan Gamboa kick), Tied 7–7
- Arizona – (2:43) Jason Geathers 13-yard pass from Nick Davila (Fabrizio Scaccia kick), Arizona 14–7

2nd quarter

- San Jose – (10:47) James Roe 8-yard pass from Mark Grieb (Juan Gamboa kick), Tied 14–14
- Arizona – (9:58) Virgil Gray 58-yard kickoff return (Fabrizio Scaccia kick), Arizona 21–14
- San Jose – (6:02) Ben Nelson 24-yard pass from Mark Grieb (Juan Gamboa kick), Tied 21–21
- Arizona – (3:08) Jason Geathers 8-yard pass from Nick Davila (Fabrizio Scaccia kick), Arizona 28–21
- San Jose – (0:57) Ben Nelson 5-yard pass from Mark Grieb (Juan Gamboa kick), Tied 28–28
- Arizona – (0:38) Jason Geathers 5-yard pass from Nick Davila (Fabrizio Scaccia kick), Arizona 35–28
- San Jose – (0:20) Marco Thomas 3-yard pass from Mark Grieb (Juan Gamboa kick), Tied 35–35

3rd quarter

- San Jose – (11:01) Chad Cook 9-yard run (Juan Gamboa kick), San Jose 42–35
- San Jose – (1:29) James Roe 9-yard pass from Mark Grieb (Juan Gamboa kick), San Jose 49–35
- Arizona – (0:30) Virgil Gray 54-yard kickoff return (Fabrizio Scaccia kick), San Jose 49–42

4th quarter

- Arizona – (9:55) Kerry Reed 23-yard pass from Nick Davila (Fabrizio Scaccia kick), Tied 49–49
- Arizona – (1:52) Rod Windsor 6-yard pass from Nick Davila (Fabrizio Scaccia kick), Arizona 56–49
- San Jose – (0:23) Ben Nelson 26-yard pass from Mark Grieb (Mark Grieb pass), San Jose 57–56
- Arizona – (0:10) Jason Geathers 12-yard pass from Nick Davila (Nick Davila pass), Arizona 64–57

Passing

- San Jose – Mark Grieb: 26/40, 285 yards, 6 TD, 1 INT
- Arizona – Nick Davila: 22/33, 270 yards, 7 TD

Rushing

- San Jose – Chad Cook: 6 att, 21 yards, 1 TD
- Arizona – Odie Armstrong: 2 att, 9 yards

Receiving

- San Jose – Ben Nelson: 5 rec, 80 yards, 3 TD
- Arizona – Jason Geathers: 8 rec, 73 yards, 4 TD

=== Week 16: at Cleveland Gladiators ===
Week 16: San Jose SaberCats at Cleveland Gladiators – Game summary

| Quarter | 1 | 2 | 3 | 4 | Total |
|---|---|---|---|---|---|
| SaberCats | 0 | 7 | 7 | 7 | 21 |
| Gladiators | 12 | 29 | 20 | 21 | 82 |

at Quicken Loans Arena, Cleveland, Ohio

- Date: June 25
- Game time: 4:00 p.m. PDT
- Game attendance: 5,617
- Referee: Tony Cannella
- Recap

Game information

1st quarter

- Cleveland – (12:41) Troy Bergeron 15-yard pass from Andrico Hines (Matt Denny kick failed), Cleveland 6–0
- Cleveland – (2:09) Troy Bergeron 24-yard pass from Andrico Hines (Matt Denny kick failed), Cleveland 12–0

2nd quarter

- Cleveland – (3:16) Robert Redd 12-yard pass from Kurt Rocco (Kurt Rocco pass), Cleveland 20–0
- San Jose – (0:51) Marco Thomas 4-yard pass from Mark Grieb (Juan Gamboa kick), Cleveland 20–7
- Cleveland – (0:20) Levy Brown 51-yard interception return (Kurt Rocco pass), Cleveland 28–7
- Cleveland – (0:02) Troy Bergeron 13-yard pass from Kurt Rocco (Matt Denny kick), Cleveland 35–7
- Cleveland – (0:00) Connor Reilly 0-yard net recovery (Matt Denny kick failed), Cleveland 41–7

3rd quarter

- Cleveland – (11:21) Troy Bergeron 4-yard pass from Kurt Rocco (Matt Denny kick failed), Cleveland 47–7
- Cleveland – (5:12) Robert Redd 20-yard pass from Kurt Rocco (Matt Denny kick), Cleveland 54–7
- Cleveland – (3:50) Joe Phinisee 7-yard interception return (Matt Denny kick), Cleveland 61–7
- San Jose – (1:56) Ben Nelson 14-yard pass from McLeod Bethel-Thompson (Juan Gamboa kick), Cleveland 61–14

4th quarter

- Cleveland – (14:54) Quorey Payne 24-yard pass from Kurt Rocco (Matt Denny kick), Cleveland 68–14
- San Jose – (11:23) Victor James 8-yard run (Juan Gamboa kick), Cleveland 68–21
- Cleveland – (8:24) Troy Bergeron 28-yard pass from Kurt Rocco (Matt Denny kick), Cleveland 75–21
- Cleveland – (0:54) Robert Redd 48-yard pass from Kurt Rocco (Matt Denny kick), Cleveland 82–21

Passing

- San Jose – Mark Grieb: 20/34, 203 yards, 1 TD, 3 INT
- Cleveland – Kurt Rocco: 18/20, 235 yards, 7 TD

Rushing

- San Jose – McLeod Bethel-Thompson: 2 att, 24 yards
- Cleveland – Kurt Rocco: 1 att, 10 yards

Receiving

- San Jose – Ben Nelson: 8 rec, 101 yards, 1 TD
- Cleveland – Troy Bergeron: 10 rec, 136 yards, 5 TD

=== Week 17: vs. Jacksonville Sharks ===
Week 17: Jacksonville Sharks at San Jose SaberCats – Game summary

| Quarter | 1 | 2 | 3 | 4 | Total |
|---|---|---|---|---|---|
| Sharks | 14 | 28 | 7 | 21 | 70 |
| SaberCats | 14 | 14 | 28 | 27 | 83 |

at HP Pavilion at San Jose, San Jose, California

- Date: July 1
- Game time: 7:30 p.m. PDT
- Game attendance: 8,216
- Referee: Dave Cutaia
- Recap

Game information

1st quarter

- Jacksonville – (12:40) Jamarko Simmons 5-yard pass from Aaron Garcia (Marco Capozzoli kick), Jacksonville 7–0
- San Jose – (8:30) Mark Lewis 27-yard pass from Mark Grieb (Juan Gamboa kick), Tied 7–7
- Jacksonville – (5:43) Jamarko Simmons 1-yard run (Marco Capozzoli kick), Jacksonville 14–7
- San Jose – (1:17) Chad Cook 3-yard run (Juan Gamboa kick), Tied 14–14

2nd quarter

- Jacksonville – (13:40) Jomo Wilson 45-yard pass from Aaron Garcia (Marco Capozzoli kick), Jacksonville 21–14
- Jacksonville – (8:41) Jomo Wilson 12-yard pass from Aaron Garcia (Marco Capozzoli kick), Jacksonville 28–14
- San Jose – (4:10) Ben Nelson 4-yard pass from Mark Grieb (Juan Gamboa kick), Jacksonville 28–21
- Jacksonville – (2:38) Jomo Wilson 10-yard pass from Aaron Garcia (Marco Capozzoli kick), Jacksonville 35–21
- Jacksonville – (0:14) Jomo Wilson 20-yard pass from Aaron Garcia (Marco Capozzoli kick), Jacksonville 42–21
- San Jose – (0:02) Marco Thomas 24-yard pass from Mark Grieb (Juan Gamboa kick), Jacksonville 42–28

3rd quarter

- San Jose – (12:29) James Roe 12 yd pass from Mark Grieb (Juan Gamboa kick), Jacksonville 42–35
- Jacksonville – (7:34) Jeff Hughley 18-yard pass from Aaron Garcia (Marco Capozzoli kick), Jacksonville 49–35
- San Jose – (5:03) Chad Cook 34-yard pass from Mark Grieb (Juan Gamboa kick), Jacksonville 49–42
- San Jose – (4:14) Kai Ellis 0-yard fumble recovery (Juan Gamboa kick), Tied 49–49
- San Jose – (1:32) James Roe 6-yard pass from Mark Grieb (Juan Gamboa kick), San Jose 56–49

4th quarter

- Jacksonville – (12:31) Jamarko Simmons 12-yard pass from Aaron Garcia (Marco Capozzoli kick), Tied 56–56
- San Jose – (7:16) Mark Grieb 4-yard run (Juan Gamboa kick), San Jose 63–56
- San Jose – (3:32) Ben Nelson 29-yard pass from Mark Grieb (Juan Gamboa kick), San Jose 70–56
- Jacksonville – (1:13) Jomo Wilson 12-yard pass from Aaron Garcia (Marco Capozzoli kick), San Jose 70–63
- San Jose – (0:52) Chad Cook 26-yard pass from Mark Grieb (Juan Gamboa kick), San Jose 77–63
- Jacksonville – (0:25) Jamarko Simmons 11-yard pass from Aaron Garcia (Marco Capozzoli kick), San Jose 77–70
- San Jose – (0:18) James Roe 9-yard pass from Mark Grieb (Juan Gamboa kick blocked), San Jose 83–70

Passing

- Jacksonville – Aaron Garcia: 27/34, 354 yards, 9 TD, 1 INT
- San Jose – Mark Grieb: 32/48, 401 yards, 9 TD, 2 INT

Rushing

- Jacksonville – Kirby Griffin: 3 att, 20 yards
- San Jose – Mark Grieb: 2 att, 4 yards, 1 TD

Receiving

- Jacksonville – Jomo Wilson: 10 rec, 134 yards, 5 TD
- San Jose – James Roe: 12 rec, 139 yards, 3 TD

=== Week 18: vs. Orlando Predators ===
Week 18: Orlando Predators at San Jose SaberCats – Game summary

| Quarter | 1 | 2 | 3 | 4 | Total |
|---|---|---|---|---|---|
| Predators | 13 | 13 | 7 | 7 | 40 |
| SaberCats | 13 | 20 | 6 | 21 | 60 |

at HP Pavilion at San Jose, San Jose, California

- Date: July 9
- Game time: 7:30 p.m. PDT
- Game attendance: 10,302
- Referee: Dave Cutaia
- Recap

Game information

1st quarter

- San Jose – (13:45) James Roe 9-yard pass from Mark Grieb (Juan Gamboa kick), San Jose 7–0
- Orlando – (9:44) T.T. Toliver 8-yard pass from Collin Drafts (Mark Lewis kick failed), San Jose 7–6
- Orlando – (2:37) Collin Drafts 3-yard run (Mark Lewis kick), Orlando 13–7
- San Jose – (0:21) James Roe 9-yard pass from Mark Grieb (Juan Gamboa kick failed), Tied 13–13

2nd quarter

- Orlando – (14:25) Josh Bush 9-yard pass from Collin Drafts (Mark Lewis kick failed), Orlando 19–13
- San Jose – (11:13) Victor James 2-yard run (Juan Gamboa kick), San Jose 20–19
- Orlando – (8:55) T.T. Toliver 35-yard pass from Collin Drafts (Mark Lewis kick), Orlando 26–20
- San Jose – (5:31) Chad Cook 2-yard run (Juan Gamboa kick failed), Tied 26–26
- San Jose – (0:14) Chad Cook 10-yard run (Juan Gamboa kick), San Jose 33–26

3rd quarter

- Orlando – (9:36) T.T. Toliver 13-yard pass from Collin Drafts (Mark Lewis kick), Tied 33–33
- San Jose – (7:19) Ben Nelson 16-yard pass from Mark Grieb (Juan Gamboa kick failed), San Jose 39–33

4th quarter

- San Jose – (11:05) Victor James 5-yard run (Juan Gamboa kick), San Jose 46–33
- Orlando – (8:31) Robert Quiroga 40-yard pass from Collin Drafts (Mark Lewis kick), San Jose 46–40
- San Jose – (4:46) Mark Lewis 2-yard pass from Mark Grieb (Juan Gamboa kick), San Jose 53–40
- San Jose – (1:10) Ben Nelson 14-yard pass from Mark Grieb (Juan Gamboa kick), San Jose 60–40

Passing

- Orlando – Collin Drafts: 27/50, 313 yards, 5 TD
- San Jose – Mark Grieb: 26/32, 295 yards, 5 TD, 1 INT

Rushing

- Orlando – Collin Drafts: 4 att, 27 yards, 1 TD
- San Jose – Chad Cook: 5 att, 17 yards, 2 TD

Receiving

- Orlando – Jomo Wilson: 9 rec, 127 yards, 1 TD
- San Jose – Ben Nelson: 7 rec, 87 yards, 2 TD

=== Week 19: at Spokane Shock ===
Week 19: San Jose SaberCats at Spokane Shock – Game summary

| Quarter | 1 | 2 | 3 | 4 | Total |
|---|---|---|---|---|---|
| SaberCats | 21 | 14 | 6 | 20 | 61 |
| Shock | 6 | 21 | 7 | 29 | 63 |

at Spokane Veterans Memorial Arena, Spokane, Washington

- Date: July 16
- Game time: 7:00 p.m. PDT
- Game attendance: 9,680
- Referee: Shane Anderson
- Recap

Game information

1st quarter

- San Jose – (14:00) James Roe 7-yard pass from Mark Grieb (Juan Gamboa kick), San Jose 7–0
- Spokane – (9:45) Kyle Rowley 1-yard run (Taylor Rowan kick failed), San Jose 7–6
- San Jose – (5:06) Victor James 3-yard run (Juan Gamboa kick), San Jose 14–6
- San Jose – (1:07) Victor James 5-yard run (Juan Gamboa kick), San Jose 21–6

2nd quarter

- Spokane – (12:07) Randy Hymes 3-yard pass from Kyle Rowley (Taylor Rowan kick), San Jose 21–13
- Spokane – (0:53) Brandon Thompkins 22-yard pass from Kyle Rowley (Taylor Rowan kick), San Jose 21–20
- San Jose – (0:33) Ben Nelson 8-yard pass from Mark Grieb (Juan Gamboa kick), San Jose 28–20
- Spokane – (0:19) Adron Tennell 17-yard pass from Kyle Rowley (Taylor Rowan kick), San Jose 28–27
- San Jose – (0:00) James Roe 14-yard pass from Mark Grieb (Juan Gamboa kick), San Jose 35–27

3rd quarter

- San Jose – (10:14) James Roe 26-yard pass from Mark Grieb (Juan Gamboa kick blocked), San Jose 41–27
- Spokane – (5:10) Adron Tennell 2-yard pass from Kyle Rowley (Taylor Rowan kick), San Jose 41–34

4th quarter

- Spokane – (14:55) Brandon Thompkins 19-yard pass from Kyle Rowley (Taylor Rowan kick blocked), San Jose 41–40
- San Jose – (9:54) Marco Thomas 1-yard pass from Mark Grieb (Juan Gamboa kick), San Jose 48–40
- Spokane – (7:00) Randy Hymes 4-yard pass from Kyle Rowley (Taylor Rowan kick), San Jose 48–47
- San Jose – (4:18) Ben Nelson 9-yard pass from Mark Grieb (Juan Gamboa kick), San Jose 55–47
- Spokane – (1:31) Randy Hymes 1-yard pass from Kyle Rowley (Brandon Thompkins rush), Tied 55–55
- Spokane – (0:58) Team safety, Spokane 57–55
- San Jose – (0:04) James Roe 11-yard pass from Mark Grieb (Mark Grieb rush failed), San Jose 61–57
- Spokane – (0:00) Randy Hymes 34-yard pass from Kyle Rowley (Kyle Rowley rush failed), Spokane 63–61

Passing

- San Jose – Mark Grieb: 32/44, 315 yards, 7 TD
- Spokane – Kyle Rowley: 24/31, 281 yards, 8 TD

Rushing

- San Jose – Victor James: 4 att, 6 yards, 2 TD
- Spokane – Randy Hymes: 1 att, 3 yards

Receiving

- San Jose – James Roe: 11 rec, 132 yards, 4 TD
- Spokane – Randy Hymes: 12 rec, 100 yards, 4 TD

=== Week 20: at Tampa Bay Storm ===
| Quarter | 1 | 2 | Total |
|---|---|---|---|
| SaberCats | | | 0 |
| Storm | | | 0 |

at St. Pete Times Forum, Tampa, Florida

- Date: July 23
- Game time: 4:30 p.m. PDT
