= 2006 Frankfurt Galaxy season =

14th season for franchise in NFL Europe League

- General manager: Tilman Engel
- Head coach: Mike Jones
- Home stadium: Commerzbank-Arena

Results
- Record: 7–3
- Division place: 2nd
- Playoffs: World Bowl XIV champion

The 2006 Frankfurt Galaxy season was the 14th season for the franchise in the NFL Europe League (NFLEL). The team was led by head coach Mike Jones in his third year, and played its home games at Commerzbank Arena in Frankfurt, Germany. They finished the regular season in second place with a record of seven wins and three losses. In World Bowl XIV, Frankfurt defeated the Amsterdam Admirals 22–7. The victory marked the franchise's fourth World Bowl championship, a league record.

== Offseason ==
=== Free agent draft ===
2006 Frankfurt Galaxy NFLEL free agent draft selections
Draft order		Player name	Position	College
Round	Choice	Player name	Position	College
1	2	Josh Cooper	DE	Mississippi
2	8	Charles Howard	DT	Florida State
3	17	Daryl Towns	LB	Nevada
4	20	J. R. Niklos	RB	Illinois
5	29	Butchie Wallace	RB	Marshall
6	32	Joselio Hanson	CB	Texas Tech
7	41	Joseph Scott	LB	Jackson State
8	44	Bill Alford	CB	Vanderbilt
9	53	Travis Harris	LB	Florida
10	55	Hannibal Thomas	WR	Cincinnati

== Personnel ==
=== Staff ===
2006 Frankfurt Galaxy staff
Front office: General Manager – Tilman Engel; Head coaches: Head Coach – Mike Jones; Offensive coaches: Offensive Coordinator/Offensive Line – Whitey Jordan; Quarterbacks – Biff Parson; Running Backs – J. J. Smith; National Coach/Tight Ends – Markus Grahn	Defensive coaches: Defensive Coordinator/Linebackers – Ed O'Neil; Defensive Line – Cornell Brown; Defensive Backs/Special Teams – Ken Stills; Assistant Defensive Backs – Corey Chamblin; Strength and conditioning: Strength and Conditioning – Jeff Carr

=== Roster ===
2006 Frankfurt Galaxy final roster
Quarterbacks: 9 Craig Ochs; 5 Jeff Otis; 6 Bryson Spinner; Running backs: 33 J. R. Niklos; 32 Roger Robinson; 34 Butchie Wallace; Wide receivers: 81 Jason Anderson; 15 Tom Crowder; 16 Adam Herzing; 89 Aaron Hosack; 87 Brandon Middleton; 19 Walter Young; Tight ends: 83 Sean McHugh; 84 Keith Willis	Offensive linemen: 76 Rob Droege T; 71 Matt McGhghy G; 69 Charles Missant C; 72 Qasim Mitchell G; 77 Jason Nerys C/G; 65 Isaac Snell G; 75 Will Svitek T; Defensive linemen: 91 Justin Brown DE; 99 Josh Cooper DE; 98 Elliot Harris DT; 77 Anttaj Hawthorne DT; 93 Jerome Nichols DE	Linebackers: 53 Sarth Benoit OLB; 58 Matt Farrior OLB; 56 Travis Harris MLB; 57 Jared Newberry OLB; 44 Matt Sinclair OLB; Defensive backs: 31 Billy Alford CB; 21 Joselio Hanson CB; 40 Brandon Haw FS; 27 Rob Lee SS; 35 James Taylor CB; 42 DeMario Williams FS/SS; 22 Lenny Williams CB; Special teams: 7 Mike Barr P; 1 David Kimball K	National players: 70 (England) Emmanuel Akah G; 90 (Germany) Daniel Benetka DT; 25 (England) Jeff Brown CB/S; 51 (Netherlands) Shurendy Concetion MLB; 66 (Germany) Samuel Gutekunst T; 20 (Germany) Martin Latka RB; 82 (Finland) Iiro Luoto TE; 95 (Germany) Ulrich Winkler DE; 80 (Mexico) Juan Wong WR; Rookies in italics

== Schedule ==
Week	Date	Kickoff (Note: All times are in Central European Time (CET), or Central European Summer Time (CEST) after March 25.)	Opponent	Results		Game site	Attendance
Week	Date	Kickoff	Opponent	Final score	Team record	Game site	Attendance
1	Saturday, March 18	7:00 p.m.	at Rhein Fire	L 6–10	0–1	LTU arena	22,827
2	Saturday, March 25	7:00 p.m.	Hamburg Sea Devils	W 31–14	1–1	Commerzbank-Arena	26,713
3	Saturday, April 1	7:00 p.m.	at Amsterdam Admirals	L 20–38	1–2	Amsterdam ArenA	9,917
4	Saturday, April 8	7:00 p.m.	Cologne Centurions	W 21–14	2–2	Commerzbank-Arena	23,125
5	Saturday, April 15	6:00 p.m.	at Hamburg Sea Devils	W 17–13	3–2	AOL Arena	12,281
6	Saturday, April 22	7:00 p.m.	Berlin Thunder	W 18–17	4–2	Commerzbank-Arena	26,812
7	Sunday, April 30	4:00 p.m.	at Cologne Centurions	W 17–10	5–2	RheinEnergieStadion	11,800
8	Saturday, May 6	7:00 p.m.	Rhein Fire	W 16–14	6–2	Commerzbank-Arena	32,172
9	Sunday, May 14	5:00 p.m.	Amsterdam Admirals	L 12–17	6–3	Commerzbank-Arena	31,769
10	Saturday, May 20	6:00 p.m.	at Berlin Thunder	W 14–13	7–3	Jahn-Sportpark	14,225
World Bowl XIV
11	Saturday, May 27	6:00 p.m.	Amsterdam Admirals	W 22–7	8–3	LTU arena	36,286

== Standings ==
NFL Europe League
Team	W	L	T	PCT	PF	PA	Home	Road	STK
Amsterdam Admirals	7	3	0	.700	259	234	2–3–0	5–0–0	L1
Frankfurt Galaxy	7	3	0	.700	172	160	4–1–0	3–2–0	W1
Rhein Fire	6	4	0	.600	207	165	4–1–0	2–3–0	W1
Cologne Centurions	4	6	0	.400	151	170	2–3–0	2–3–0	L1
Hamburg Sea Devils	3	6	1	.350	194	193	1–3–1	2–3–0	W3
Berlin Thunder	2	7	1	.250	180	241	1–4–0	1–3–1	L5

== Game summaries ==
=== Week 1: at Rhein Fire ===
Week One: Frankfurt Galaxy at Rhein Fire – Game summary

Quarter	1	2	3	4	Total
Frankfurt	3	0	3	0	6
Rhein	7	3	0	0	10

at LTU arena, Düsseldorf, Germany

- Date: Saturday, March 18
- Game time: 7:06 p.m. CET
- Game weather: 62 °F (17 °C), roof closed
- Game attendance: 22,827
- Referee: Terry Brown

Game information

First quarter

- Rhein – Juan Wong 45-yard touchdown reception from Chris Samp, Ola Kimrin kick good, 12:43.
- Frankfurt – 36-yard field goal by David Kimball, 2:59.

Second quarter

- Rhein – 42-yard field goal by Ola Kimrin, 0:34.

Third quarter

- Frankfurt – 49-yard field goal by David Kimball, 4:52.

Fourth quarter

- No scoring.

=== Week 2: vs Hamburg Sea Devils ===
Week Two: Hamburg Sea Devils at Frankfurt Galaxy – Game summary

Quarter	1	2	3	4	Total
Hamburg	0	7	7	0	14
Frankfurt	7	14	3	7	31

at Commerzbank-Arena, Frankfurt, Germany

- Date: Saturday, March 25
- Game time: 7:09 p.m. CET
- Game weather: 40 °F (4 °C), partly cloudy
- Game attendance: 26,713
- Referee: Carl Cheffers

=== Week 3: at Amsterdam Admirals ===
Week Three: Frankfurt Galaxy at Amsterdam Admirals – Game summary

Quarter	1	2	3	4	Total
Frankfurt	7	3	3	7	20
Amsterdam	14	10	7	7	38

at Amsterdam ArenA, Amsterdam, Netherlands

- Date: Saturday, April 1
- Game time: 7:06 p.m. CEST
- Game weather: 54 °F (12 °C), roof open, partly cloudy
- Game attendance: 9,917
- Referee: Alberto Riveron

=== Week 4: vs Cologne Centurions ===
Week Four: Cologne Centurions at Frankfurt Galaxy – Game summary

Quarter	1	2	3	4	Total
Cologne	0	7	0	7	14
Frankfurt	0	14	0	7	21

at Commerzbank-Arena, Frankfurt, Germany

- Date: Saturday, April 8
- Game time: 7:05 p.m. CEST
- Game weather: 56 °F (13 °C), sunny
- Game attendance: 23,125
- Referee: Jerome Boger

=== Week 5: at Hamburg Sea Devils ===
Week Five: Frankfurt Galaxy at Hamburg Sea Devils – Game summary

Quarter	1	2	3	4	Total
Frankfurt	0	7	3	7	17
Hamburg	0	10	0	3	13

at AOL Arena, Hamburg, Germany

- Date: Saturday, April 15
- Game time: 6:05 p.m. CEST
- Game weather: 57 °F (14 °C), cloudy
- Game attendance: 12,281
- Referee: Craig Wrolstad

=== Week 6: vs Berlin Thunder ===
Week Six: Berlin Thunder at Frankfurt Galaxy – Game summary

Quarter	1	2	3	4	Total
Berlin	0	7	3	7	17
Frankfurt	0	3	6	9	18

at Commerzbank-Arena, Frankfurt, Germany

- Date: Saturday, April 22
- Game time: 7:10 p.m. CEST
- Game weather: 61 °F (16 °C), sunny
- Game attendance: 26,812
- Referee: John Parry

=== Week 7: at Cologne Centurions ===
Week Seven: Frankfurt Galaxy at Cologne Centurions – Game summary

Quarter	1	2	3	4	Total
Frankfurt	0	10	0	7	17
Cologne	7	0	3	0	10

at RheinEnergieStadion, Cologne, Germany

- Date: Sunday, April 30
- Game time: 4:06 p.m. CEST
- Game weather: 49 °F (9 °C), mostly cloudly
- Game attendance: 11,800
- Referee: Gene Steratore

=== Week 8: vs Rhein Fire ===
Week Eight: Rhein Fire at Frankfurt Galaxy – Game summary

Quarter	1	2	3	4	Total
Rhein	0	7	0	7	14
Frankfurt	3	3	7	3	16

at Commerzbank-Arena, Frankfurt, Germany

- Date: Saturday, May 6
- Game time: 7:04 p.m. CEST
- Game weather: 71 °F (22 °C), sunny
- Game attendance: 32,172
- Referee: Gene Steratore

=== Week 9: vs Amsterdam Admirals ===
Week Nine: Amsterdam Admirals at Frankfurt Galaxy – Game summary

Quarter	1	2	3	4	Total
Amsterdam	0	3	7	7	17
Frankfurt	3	3	0	6	12

at Commerzbank-Arena, Frankfurt, Germany

- Date: Saturday, May 6
- Game time: 5:05 p.m. CEST
- Game weather: 70 °F (21 °C), roof closed
- Game attendance: 31,769
- Referee: Greg Meyer

=== Week 10: at Berlin Thunder ===
Week Ten: Frankfurt Galaxy at Berlin Thunder – Game summary

Quarter	1	2	3	4	Total
Frankfurt	0	7	7	0	14
Berlin	6	7	0	0	13

at Friedrich-Ludwig-Jahn-Sportpark, Berlin, Germany

- Date: Saturday, May 20
- Game time: 6:05 p.m. CEST
- Game weather: 64 °F (18 °C), cloudy with showers, windy
- Game attendance: 14,225
- Referee: Alberto Riveron

=== World Bowl XIV ===
World Bowl XIV: Amsterdam Admirals vs Frankfurt Galaxy – Game summary

Quarter	1	2	3	4	Total
Frankfurt	2	0	10	10	22
Amsterdam	0	7	0	0	7

at LTU arena, Düsseldorf, Germany

- Date: Saturday, May 27
- Game time: 6:06 p.m. CEST
- Game weather: 61 °F (16 °C), roof closed
- Game attendance: 36,286
- Referee: Jerome Boger
- TV announcers (NFL Network): Curt Menefee and Brian Baldinger

== Honors ==
After the completion of the regular season, the All-NFL Europe League team was selected by the NFLEL coaching staffs, members of a media panel and fans voting online at NFLEurope.com. Overall, Frankfurt had five players selected. The selections were:

- Brandon Haw, safety
- Aaron Hosack, wide receiver
- Jerome Nichols, defensive tackle
- Roger Robinson, running back
- Will Svitek, tackle

Head coach Mike Jones earned NFL Europe League Coach of the Year honors.
