= Juan Wong =

Mexico gridiron football player (born 1981)

ITESM Laguna (juvenile)
- Title: Head coach

Personal information
- Born: 6 May 1981 (age 45); Torreón, Coahuila, Mexico
- Listed height: 5 ft 11 in (1.80 m)
- Listed weight: 185 lb (84 kg)

Career information
- College: ITESM Laguna (2001–2003)

Career history

Playing
- Dallas Desperados (2004)*; Rhein Fire (2006); Frankfurt Galaxy (2006); Hamburg Sea Devils (2007); New York Jets (2007)*; Olmecas Premier (2014)
- * Offseason or practice squad member only

Coaching
- ITESM (2017–2020) Wide receivers coach

Awards and highlights
- 2× World Bowl champion (XIV, XV); ONEFA Offensive Player of the Year (2002); ONEFA Rookie of the Year (2001)

Juan Wong
Medal record

Men's American football

Representing Mexico

World Championship
Silver medal – second place	2003 Germany	Team

Juan Alberto Wong Borunda (born 6 May 1981) is a Mexican gridiron football coach and former wide receiver who is the current head coach of the Borregos Salvajes Laguna juvenile (under-18) team. He played college football with the Borregos Salvajes Laguna before signing with the Dallas Desperados of the Arena Football League in 2004. Wong played in NFL Europe for two seasons, appearing for the Rhein Fire, the Frankfurt Galaxy, and the Hamburg Sea Devils, before participating in New York Jets training camp in 2007.

Wong represented the Mexico national team at the 2003 IFAF World Championship, winning a silver medal.

== Early life and youth career ==
Wong was born on 6 May 1981 in Torreón, Coahuila, to Juan Alberto Wong Cobian and Rosadelia Borunda García. His paternal great-grandfather was Chinese. Wong began playing American football at a young age, joining the infant categories of the Jaguares del Campestre La Rosita, because his father was the head coach of the Gatos Negros del Tec Laguna, the football team at the La Laguna Institute of Technology.

Wong later joined the Borregos Salvajes Laguna, leading the juvenile (18 and under) team to an appearance in the championship game as their quarterback. The following season, Wong was moved up to the intermediate (20 and under) team, which competed in the CONOFAI, and was converted to a wide receiver, which he played from thereon out. After the Borregos Laguna joined ONEFA, Wong led the intermediate category in catches and receiving yards in two consecutive seasons.

== College career ==
Wong attended the Monterrey Institute of Technology and Higher Education (ITESM), Laguna Campus and played with the Borregos Laguna college football team in the Liga Mayor, the highest-tier category in ONEFA, from 2001 to 2003. He led the league in receiving yards and touchdowns among wide receivers in his first season, earning Rookie of the Year honors. In 2002, Wong again led all receivers in touchdowns and was named the Offensive Player of the Year.

Wong was also a three-time selection to the Aztec Bowl, where he represented the Mexican All-Stars against a team of NCAA Division III All-Stars. He scored his team's only touchdown in the 2002 game, which was held in his hometown of Torreón. The following year, Wong was a part of the team that defeated the NCAA Division III All-Stars for the first time in Aztec Bowl history. Additionally, he was chosen to play in the 2002 Friendship Bowl against a team from Japan, catching a touchdown pass from Ignacio Valdéz in the 27–24 loss.

Wong studied international trade at ITESM Laguna.

== Professional career ==
Wong was signed by the Dallas Desperados of the Arena Football League (AFL) in December 2003 after a tryout in Mexico. However, he was waived in February 2004 as part of the final round of cuts, days before their season opener.

Wong was signed by the Rhein Fire of NFL Europe (NFLE) ahead of the 2006 season. He was one of seven Mexican players signed by NFLE teams after participating in a training camp in Tampa, Florida, with other international prospects. In the season opener, Wong caught a 45-yard touchdown pass from fellow receiver Chris Samp as part of a trick play on the Fire's first play from scrimmage, helping them defeat the Frankfurt Galaxy 10–6. He appeared in five games for the Fire, catching three passes for 77 yards and one touchdown, before he was traded to the Frankfurt Galaxy midseason while recovering from a quad injury. Wong helped the Galaxy reach the league championship game, World Bowl XIV, where they defeated the Amsterdam Admirals 22–7 to win their fourth title in franchise history.

At the conclusion of a 2007 international minicamp, Wong was assigned to the Hamburg Sea Devils, returning to NFL Europe for a second season. He recorded one catch for 11 yards in the regular season, as well as one catch for 26 yards in World Bowl XV as the Sea Devils defeated the Frankfurt Galaxy 37–28 for the title.

Wong joined the New York Jets training camp in July 2007 via an NFL Europe roster exemption, signing a free agent deal upon his arrival. After seeing limited playing time in the preseason, Wong was waived by the Jets on August 27 to reach the 75-man roster limit.

In 2014, Wong played with Olmecas Premier in the semi-professional Futbol Americano Asociacion (FAMA) league in Mexico. He aided the team to an appearance in the championship game, where they lost to Tigres Oro SSP, led by former Águilas Blancas IPN quarterback Raúl Mateos.

== National team career ==
Wong was called up to the Mexico national team ahead of the 2003 IFAF World Championship held in Germany. He helped Mexico reach the championship game against Japan, where he caught a touchdown pass from Juan Zamora, but Mexico lost 34–14 and settled for the silver medal.

== Coaching career ==
Wong began coaching in 2009, serving as the wide receivers coach for UVM Torreón juvenile (18 and under) team. He was promoted to offensive coordinator the following year before another promotion to head coach the year after that. Wong served as the team's head coach for three seasons and guided them to two CEFAN championships.

Wong took his first job in ONEFA when he was hired as the wide receivers coach for the Borregos Salvajes by head coach Carlos Altamirano in 2017, who he knew personally.

In February 2021, Wong was hired as the head coach of the ITESM Laguna juvenile team.
