= Bryson Spinner =

American football player (born 1980)

No. 4
- Position: Quarterback

Personal information
- Born: November 7, 1980 (age 45); Alexandria, Virginia
- Listed height: 6 ft 3 in (1.91 m)
- Listed weight: 185 lb (84 kg)

Career information
- High school: Alexandria (VA) Episcopal
- College: Virginia (1999–2001); Richmond (2002–2003)
- NFL draft: 2004: undrafted

Career history
- Jacksonville Jaguars (2004)*; Seattle Seahawks (2004)*; Washington Redskins (2005)*; San Francisco 49ers (2006)*; Frankfurt Galaxy (2006); Maryland Maniacs (2009–2010)
- * Offseason or practice squad member only

Bryson A. Spinner (born November 7, 1980) is an American former football quarterback. He entered the National Football League as free agent when he signed with the Jacksonville Jaguars after the 2004 NFL draft. He played college football at Virginia and then transferred to Richmond.

== Early life ==
Spinner attended Gar-Field Senior High School in Woodbridge, Virginia and was the starting quarterback as a freshman that season. In the spring of 1996, he transferred to Episcopal High School in Alexandria, Virginia. Spinner lettered all 3 years in football, basketball, and track and was the Senior Captain of all three sports. He helped take the basketball team to three state championships, and was the MVP all three years. His senior year of football he threw for 1388 yards and 16 touchdowns, ran for 888 yards for 21 touchdowns. He led the team to an undefeated season, 9–0. Spinner was first-team All-League, All-District, All-Met, IAC First-team basketball and football. He was ranked as the #1 quarterback in Virginia by The Washington Post his senior year and ranked 12th in the country. In 2007, he returned to Episcopal High School as a quarterback and defensive end coach.

== College career ==
Spinner enrolled at the University of Virginia in the fall of 1999 and redshirted his true freshman season. In 2000, starter Dan Ellis missed some time due to injury and Spinner started over fellow redshirt freshman quarterback Matt Schaub, receiving the bulk of playing time in relief. After the 2000 season, coach George Welsh retired and was replaced by Al Groh. During the 2001 season Spinner and Schaub split quarterbacking duties; Spinner was 5–1 as the starter that season. Before the 2002 season, Spinner transferred to the University of Richmond Spiders, coached by Jim Reid. Spinner underwent surgery and returned for the 2003 season.

His most memorable performance at Virginia was in a 39–38 victory over Georgia Tech in 2001. Spinner completed 32-of-46 passes for a season-high 327 yards and five touchdowns. The 6–2 sophomore also ran 10 times for 86 yards as the Cavaliers improved to 11–12–1 all-time against the Yellow Jackets. The Cavaliers won the game on a dramatic hook-and-ladder play in which Spinner passed the ball to Billy McMullen who then lateraled the ball to Alvin Pearman who ran in for a touchdown in the game's closing seconds.

== NFL career ==
In 2004, Spinner signed as a free agent with the Jacksonville Jaguars, and then was released. He was soon picked up by the Seattle Seahawks a week later, completed preseason training camp, and was released before the 2004 season. In 2005, he signed with the Washington Redskins, completed training camp and was released before the season opener. In January 2006, Spinner signed with the San Francisco 49ers, and was allocated to the Frankfurt Galaxy in NFL Europa. Spinner split time with two other quarterbacks, Jeff Otis and Craig Ochs, leading the Galaxy to a 7–3 season, and winning World Bowl XIV. Spinner injured his shoulder in the second quarter of the World Bowl.

== Maryland Maniacs ==
For the 2009 season, Spinner was the starting quarterback for the Maryland Maniacs of the Indoor Football League. The Maniacs finished the regular season 10–4 and won the Atlantic Division championship, but lost their playoff game to the RiverCity Rage.

The IFL transactions page reported that Spinner would be returning to the Maniacs for the 2010 season.
