= Kevin Harrison =

American football player (born 1981)

No. 50
- Position: Linebacker

Personal information
- Born: December 24, 1981 (age 44); Belleville, Michigan, U.S.

Career information
- College: Eastern Michigan
- NFL draft: 2005: undrafted

Career history
- Cleveland Browns (2005)*; Berlin Thunder (2006); Denver Broncos (2006)*; Buffalo Bills (2006–2007)
- * Offseason or practice squad member only

Awards and highlights
- Second-team All-MAC (2004)
- Stats at Pro Football Reference

Kevin Alexander Harrison (born December 24, 1981) is an American former professional football player who was a linebacker for the Buffalo Bills of the National Football League. He played college football for the Eastern Michigan Eagles and was signed by the Cleveland Browns as an undrafted free agent in 2005.

== Professional career ==
Harrison was placed on injured reserve on October 11, 2007, by the Buffalo Bills due to a knee injury.
