= Elton Patterson =

American football player (born 1981)

No. 98, 78, 91
- Position: Defensive end

Personal information
- Born: June 3, 1981 (age 45); Tallahassee, Florida, U.S.
- Listed height: 6 ft 2 in (1.88 m)
- Listed weight: 271 lb (123 kg)

Career information
- High school: James S. Rickards (Tallahassee)
- College: UCF
- NFL draft: 2003: 7th round, 259th overall pick

Career history
- Cincinnati Bengals (2003–2004); Jacksonville Jaguars (2004); Cincinnati Bengals (2005)*; Minnesota Vikings (2005)*; Jacksonville Jaguars (2006); → Berlin Thunder (2006); Orlando Predators (2008); Hamilton Tiger-Cats (2009)*
- * Offseason or practice squad member only

Awards and highlights
- First-team All-MAC (2002)

Career NFL statistics
- Total tackles: 8
- Sacks: 1
- Fumble recoveries: 1
- Stats at Pro Football Reference
- Stats at ArenaFan.com

Elton G. Patterson (born June 3, 1981) is an American former professional football player who was a defensive end in the National Football League (NFL). He was selected by the Cincinnati Bengals in the seventh round of the 2003 NFL draft. He played college football for the UCF Knights.

Patterson was also a member of the Jacksonville Jaguars, Minnesota Vikings, Berlin Thunder, Orlando Predators, and Hamilton Tiger-Cats.

== Early life ==
Patterson played high school football at James S. Rickards High School in Tallahassee, Florida as a defensive end and offensive guard, earning first-team All-State honors his senior year. He lettered in football, basketball and track in high school.

== College career ==
Patterson played college football for the UCF Knights from 1999 to 2002. He played in every game his freshman year in 1999, totaling 20 tackles and two sacks. He was then a three-year starter from 2000 to 2002. Patterson recorded 88 tackles and 10 sacks in 2000, 85 tackles and nine sacks in 2001, and 63 tackles and 9.5 sacks in 2002. He was named first-team All-Mid American Conference in 2002. Patterson majored in health services administration at UCF.

== Professional career ==
Patterson was selected by the Cincinnati Bengals in the seventh round, with the 259th overall pick, of the 2003 NFL draft. He officially signed with the team on July 25, 2003. He was waived on September 5, 2004, and signed to the Bengals' practice squad on September 7. Patterson was promoted to the active roster on September 23 and played in two games for the Bengals that season, recording one solo tackle. He was waived on October 5 and re-signed to the practice squad on October 7, 2004.

Patterson was signed to the Jacksonville Jaguars' active roster off of the Bengals' practice squad on October 15, 2004. He appeared in six games for the Jaguars in 2004, totaling three solo tackles, four assisted tackles, one sack and one fumble recovery.

He signed a two-year deal with the Bengals on April 25, 2005. He was waived on August 29, 2005.

Patterson was signed to the practice squad of the Minnesota Vikings on October 25, 2005.

Patterson signed a reserve/future contract with the Jaguars on January 16, 2006. He was allocated to NFL Europe and played in nine games, all starts, for the Berlin Thunder in 2006. He totaled 17 tackles, four sacks, four pass breakups and one forced fumble for the Thunder. He was waived/injured by the Jaguars on August 29, 2006, and reverted to injured reserve the next day. Patterson became a free agent on March 2, 2007.

He signed with the Orlando Predators of the Arena Football League on March 17, 2008. He was waived on March 26 and re-signed on April 2. Patterson was placed on injured reserve on April 8, 2008.

He was signed by the Hamilton Tiger-Cats of the Canadian Football League on May 8, 2009. He was released on June 6, 2009.

== Post-playing career ==
Patterson became an NFLPA certified agent in 2012.
