= Brian Wrobel =

American football player (born 1982)

Profile
- Position: Quarterback

Personal information
- Born: April 4, 1982 (age 44); Stoddard, Wisconsin, U.S.
- Listed height: 6 ft 2 in (1.88 m)
- Listed weight: 197 lb (89 kg)

Career information
- High school: De Soto High School Wisconsin
- College: Winona State
- NFL draft: 2005: undrafted

Career history
- Seattle Seahawks (2005)*; Berlin Thunder (2006); Green Bay Packers (2006)*; Rhein Fire (2007)
- * Offseason or practice squad member only

Brian Albert Wrobel (born April 4, 1982) is an American former football quarterback. He was signed by the Seattle Seahawks as an undrafted free agent in 2005. Wrobel was also a member of the Berlin Thunder, Green Bay Packers and Rhein Fire. He played college football at Winona State.

== Early life ==
Wrobel was a three-sport letterwinner at DeSoto High School, where he played football, basketball and baseball. In 2001, Wrobel went on to play football at Winona State, where he would become one of the university's top players for career touchdowns, pass attempts, passing yards and total offences.

== Professional career ==
=== Seattle Seahawks ===
Wrobel was not drafted and was signed as an undrafted free agent with the Seattle Seahawks.

=== Green Bay Packers ===
Wrobel was signed by the Green Bay Packers on January 1, 2006. He was released by the Packers on August 29, 2006. Wrobel never played in an NFL game.

==== Berlin Thunder ====
Wrobel was allocated to the Berlin Thunder for the 2006 NFL Europa season. In a reserve role, he completed 28 of 60 passes for 293 yards and one touchdown and also rushed 16 times for 42 yards and a touchdown.

== Coaching career ==
In 2009, Wrobel was named a quarterback coach at the University of Wisconsin–La Crosse.

In 2025, Wrobel was named to the Winona State Athletics Hall of Fame.
