= Joselio Hanson =

American football player (born 1981)

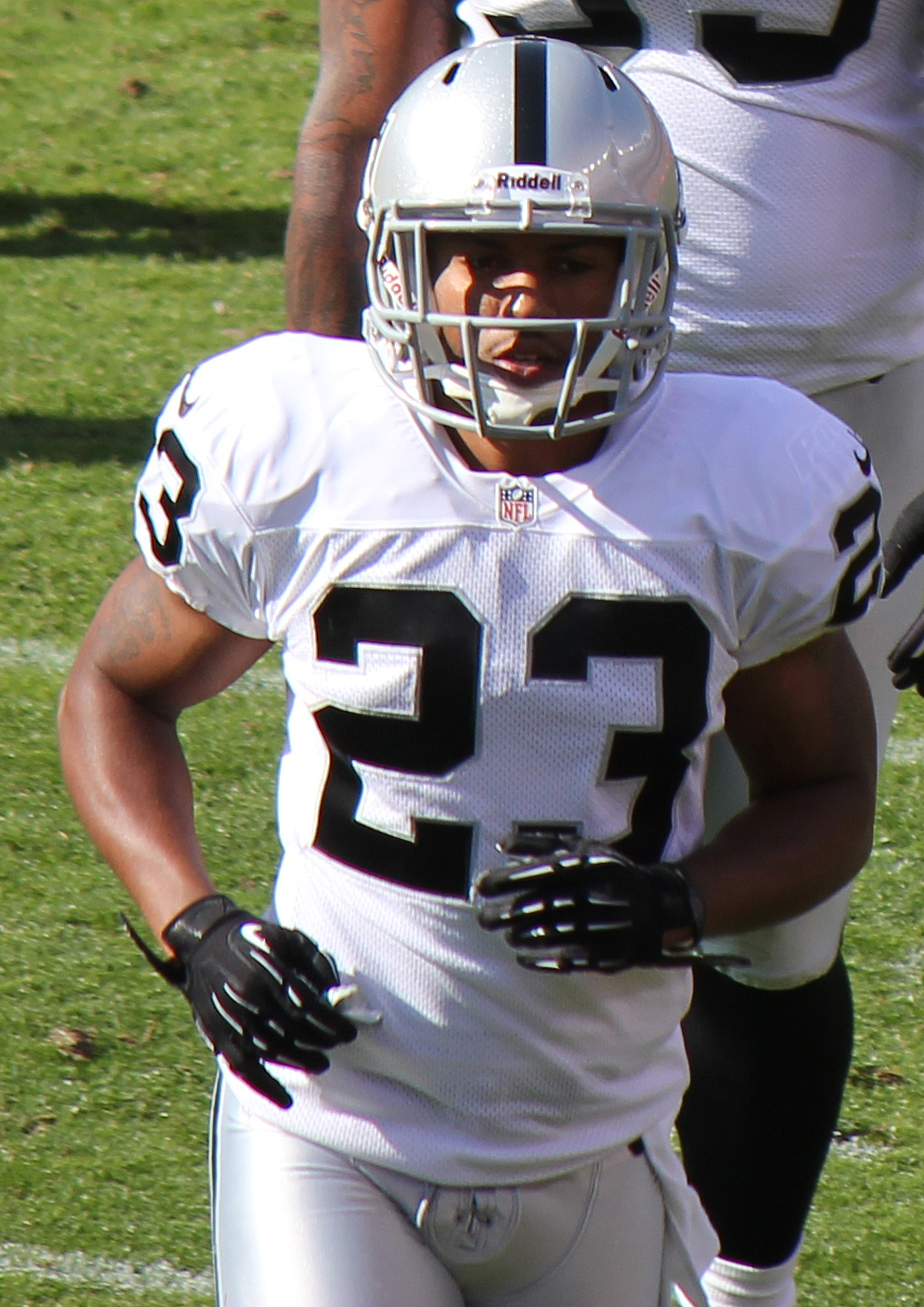
- Hanson with the Oakland Raiders in 2012

No. 27, 22, 21, 23
- Position: Cornerback

Personal information
- Born: August 13, 1981 (age 45); Inglewood, California, U.S.
- Listed height: 5 ft 9 in (1.75 m)
- Listed weight: 185 lb (84 kg)

Career information
- High school: St. Bernard (Los Angeles, California)
- College: Texas Tech
- NFL draft: 2003: undrafted

Career history
- San Francisco 49ers (2003–2004); Frankfurt Galaxy (2006); Philadelphia Eagles (2006–2011); Oakland Raiders (2012-2013)

Awards and highlights
- World Bowl champion (XIV)

Career NFL statistics
- Total tackles: 320
- Sacks: 3.5
- Forced fumbles: 1
- Fumble recoveries: 7
- Interceptions: 6
- Defensive touchdowns: 1
- Stats at Pro Football Reference

Joselio Basilio Hanson (born August 13, 1981) is an American former professional football player who was a cornerback in the National Football League (NFL). He began his professional career by signing with the San Francisco 49ers as an undrafted free agent in 2003. He also spent one year of his career in NFL Europe with the Frankfurt Galaxy, six seasons with the Philadelphia Eagles, and one season with the Oakland Raiders.

He played college football for the Texas Tech Red Raiders after transferring from El Camino Junior College.

== Early life ==
Hanson's parents are John, a musician, and Yolanda, an opera singer. He attended St. Bernard High School in Los Angeles California and was a letterman in football and basketball. After not even starting as a junior, he helped lead his team to the state finals as a senior.

== College career ==
Hanson first played college football at El Camino Junior College, before transferring to Texas Tech for his final two years. He also received interest from Illinois and Arkansas. At Texas Tech, he majored in human development and family studies.

== Professional career ==
=== San Francisco 49ers ===
After not being selected in the 2003 NFL draft, Hanson was signed by the San Francisco 49ers as an undrafted free agent. He did not make the final roster as a rookie, but was retained on the team's practice squad through the regular season. In 2004 he made the active roster and went on to play in 13 games that year, starting three of them. He registered 18 solo tackles, two assists, six pass deflections and a sack.

Hanson remained a member of the 49ers through the 2005 offseason, but was cut prior to the beginning of the regular season.

=== Frankfurt Galaxy ===
After his release from the 49ers, Hanson was not picked up by another NFL team and chose to spend a season in Europe with the Frankfurt Galaxy, after they drafted him in the 6th round of the league's free agent draft. The Galaxy won the league championship in his first and only year with the team.

=== Philadelphia Eagles ===
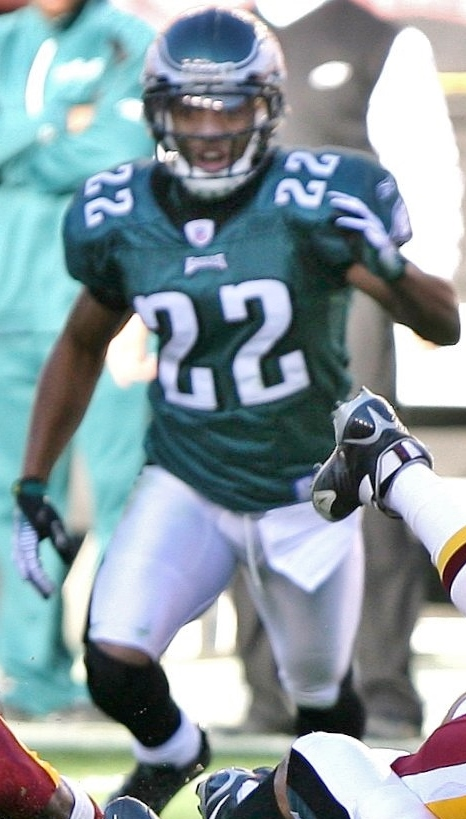
Hanson with the Eagles in 2006

In 2006, shortly after the conclusion of the NFL Europe season, Hanson was signed to a two-year contract by the Philadelphia Eagles. That season, Hanson played in all sixteen games for Philadelphia, starting one, garnering 26 solo tackles, nine assists, and thirteen pass deflections. In 2007 season, he again played in all sixteen games, starting four, and made 45 solo tackles and seven assists, along with a sack and a fumble recovery. This earned him a one-year contract for the 2008 season.

Hanson's number was changed from 22 to 21 during the 2008 offseason, due to Asante Samuel signing with the team. On the Thanksgiving night game against the Arizona Cardinals, Hanson started in place of an injured Samuel and recorded his first career interception. In week 17 against the Dallas Cowboys, he returned a fumble 97 yards for his first career touchdown, as part of a 44–6 victory that sent the Eagles to the playoffs.

On February 20, 2009, Hanson agreed to a five-year contract with the Eagles, worth $21 million. He was scheduled to become an unrestricted free agent the following week.

Hanson was released on September 3, 2011, during final roster cuts. Hanson was re-signed to a two-year contract by the Eagles on September 7, 2011.

He was released again during final roster cuts on August 31, 2012.

=== Oakland Raiders ===
Hanson was signed by Oakland Raiders on September 3, 2012. On August 27, 2013, he was placed on the injured reserve list. On August 31, 2013, he was waived with an injury settlement.

== NFL career statistics ==
Legend
	Led the league
**Bold**	Career high

=== Regular season ===
Year	Team	Games		Tackles					Interceptions					Fumbles			
Year	Team	GP	GS	Cmb	Solo	Ast	Sck	TFL	Int	Yds	TD	Lng	PD	FF	FR	Yds	TD
2004	SFO	13	3	20	18	2	**1.0**	1	0	0	0	0	6	0	0	0	0
2006	PHI	16	1	35	26	9	0.0	1	0	0	0	0	**13**	0	0	0	0
2007	PHI	16	4	53	46	7	**1.0**	3	0	0	0	0	3	0	1	0	0
2008	PHI	16	3	38	27	11	**1.0**	2	1	13	0	13	5	0	1	**96**	**1**
2009	PHI	12	1	47	36	11	0.5	**4**	**2**	8	0	6	8	0	1	12	0
2010	PHI	15	6	36	31	5	0.0	0	1	17	0	17	7	0	0	0	0
2011	PHI	16	1	30	26	4	0.0	0	0	0	0	0	4	0	**2**	4	0
2012	OAK	16	5	**61**	**49**	**12**	0.0	3	**2**	**24**	0	**21**	5	**1**	**2**	1	0
		120	24	320	259	61	3.5	14	6	62	0	21	51	1	7	113	1

=== Postseason ===
Year	Team	Games		Tackles					Interceptions					Fumbles			
Year	Team	GP	GS	Cmb	Solo	Ast	Sck	TFL	Int	Yds	TD	Lng	PD	FF	FR	Yds	TD
2006	PHI	2	0	2	2	0	0.0	0	0	0	0	0	0	**1**	0	0	0
2008	PHI	3	0	**7**	**6**	**1**	0.0	0	0	0	0	0	0	0	0	0	0
2009	PHI	1	0	1	0	**1**	0.0	0	0	0	0	0	**1**	0	0	0	0
2010	PHI	1	0	1	1	0	0.0	0	0	0	0	0	0	0	0	0	0
		7	0	11	9	2	0.0	0	0	0	0	0	1	1	0	0	0
