= Brian Simnjanovski =

American football player (1981–2009)

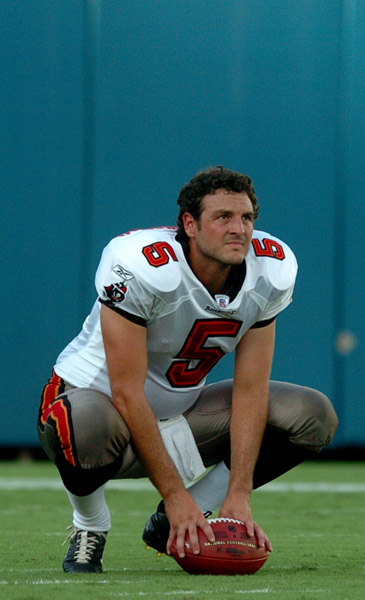
- Simnjanovski with the Tampa Bay Buccaneers in 2006

No. 5, 6
- Position: Punter

Personal information
- Born: May 28, 1981; Escondido, California, U.S.
- Died: May 10, 2009 (aged 27); San Diego, California, U.S.
- Listed height: 6 ft 3 in (1.91 m)
- Listed weight: 205 lb (93 kg)

Career information
- High school: Escondido (Escondido, California)
- College: San Diego State (1999–2002)
- NFL draft: 2003: undrafted

Career history
- New York Jets (2004)*; Tampa Bay Buccaneers (2005–2006)*; → Berlin Thunder (2005–2006)
- * Offseason or practice squad member only

Brian Simnjanovski (May 29, 1981 – May 10, 2009) was an American former professional football punter who played for the New York Jets, and the Tampa Bay Buccaneers in the National Football League (NFL) before playing in NFL Europe for the Berlin Thunder.

== Early life ==
Simnjanovski attended Escondido High School and was a student and a letterman in football and soccer and as a senior, he was named Escondido High School's co–Athlete of the Year. In football, he was an All–Valley selection. In soccer, he was a four-year letterman. He played club soccer with FC San Diego and the San Diego Nomads. During his club play he was selected as an Olympic Development Player and represented the western United States from 1996–1998. Simnjanovski graduated from Escondido High School with Honors distinction.

== College career ==
A two-time academic all-conference pick who was named as a Verizon Academic All-American following his junior season. Coming off an impressive campaign, he had recorded two of the best single-season averages in school history. He also handled kickoff duties and battled for place-kicking assignments after a strong spring of putting the ball through the uprights. He was a valuable weapon for the San Diego State Aztecs. He Finished 14th nationally and topped in the Mountain West in punting his junior year. He was on the Ray Guy Award watch list and was a strong contender for the honor in his senior year. Simnjanovski the Aztecs' special teams player of the year his junior and senior years at SDSU.

2001: Averaged 43.6 yards per punt for the third best single-season average in the history of San Diego State - Had 14 punts that covered at least 50 yards and had another 22 downed inside the opposition's 20-yard-line -Best game of the season may have come at Arizona State. He Averaged 47.4 yards on eight punts at ASU. He had four punts travel over 50 yards and four that were downed inside the 20 against the Sun Devils -Booted a 64-yarder in the field position battle at Colorado State and had nine kicks for a 46.8-yard average in Fort Collins.

2000: Handled every kickoff for the Aztecs, recording six touchbacks. He emerged as one of the nation's top punters and handled all but pooch-punt situations. He averaged 42.8 yards on 55 punts, including a 60-yarder at New Mexico, to rank second in the MWC and 14th nationally in punting, it was the seventh best average in school history. His 43.8-yard average during conference play led the league. In all, he had nine punts travel over 50 yards. He placed six punts inside the 20-yard-line.

1999: Simnjanovski saw action all season as a walk-on, handling kickoff duties. He was credited with two tackles.

== Professional career ==
=== New York Jets ===
After going undrafted in the 2003 NFL draft, he worked out for the Arizona Cardinals in training camp, but never officially signed with them. Simnjanovski was signed by the New York Jets in the 2004 offseason. He had four punts in his lone preseason game with the Jets. He was waived after losing the starting job to Toby Gowin.

=== Berlin Thunder (first stint) ===
Afterwards, in the 2005 NFL Europe season, he was signed by the Berlin Thunder, where he played all 10 games and got the Special Teams Player of the Week, alongside fellow kicker, Todd France. He ended up with 41 punts for 1,642 yard for an average of 40 yards, with a net of 37.6 with a long of 61 yards, with 9 kicks inside the 20, 5 of which were touchbacks.

=== Tampa Bay Buccaneers (first stint) ===
On January 14, 2005, the Tampa Bay Buccaneers signed Simnjanovski. After allocating him through the 2005 season with the Thunder, he signed with the Buccaneers to be on their roster. On September 2, 2005, the Buccaneers released Simnjanovski.

=== Berlin Thunder (second stint) ===
In the 2006 season, his second with the Thunder, Simnjanovski ranked as the No. 4 punter in NFL Europe, averaging 39.5 yards per punt. He punted 50 times for a gross total of 1,974 yards with a long of 54 yards. He pinned opponents inside the 20 yard line on 18 occasions. Simnjanovski was allocated to the Berlin Thunder by the Tampa Bay Buccaneers of the National Football League.

=== Tampa Bay Buccaneers (second stint) ===
On January 10, 2006, Simnjanovski was signed once again to the Buccaneers. After the 2006 NFL Europe season, he would once again be signed to the future list, and be released again on August 29, 2006.

== NFL Europe statistics ==
Season	Team	GP	Punting					
Season	Team	GP	Punts	Yards	Y/P	Net	In20	TB
2005	BER	10	41	1,642	40.0	37.6	9	5
2006	BER	10	50	1,974	39.5	32.3	18	6
Career		20	91	3,616	39.7	34.7	27	11

== Personal life ==
Simnjanovski was the son of Macedonian immigrants, Djoko and Zorka Simnjanovski (Macedonian spelling of surname: Симњаковски), and was the younger brother of author and political theorist, Riste Simnjanovski (a California Baptist University Dean and Professor). Brian was also a second cousin to Aztec placekicker Tommy Kirovski; and Jovan Kirovski a former member of the U.S. national soccer team and current technical director of the Los Angeles Galaxy in Major League Soccer. He was an undergraduate social science major, and had completed his teaching credential at California State University San Marcos. He died six days before he was scheduled to receive his degree.

== Death ==
Simnjanovski died May 10, 2009, after his Audi A4 3.0 sedan slammed into a tree at about 10 p.m PST. He was 27 years, 11 months and 11 days old. Simnjanovski was driving south on Valley Center Road in San Diego when his car swerved at a curve at Vesper Road, authorities said. Simnjanovski, who was a graduate student at California State University's San Marcos campus, was alone in the car and died on impact, according to the San Diego County medical examiner's office. Simnjanovski, who was single, is survived by his parents Djoko and Zorka Simnjanovski and his brother Riste Simnjanovski. The cause of death is unknown.
