= Will Svitek =

Czech gridiron football player (born 1982)

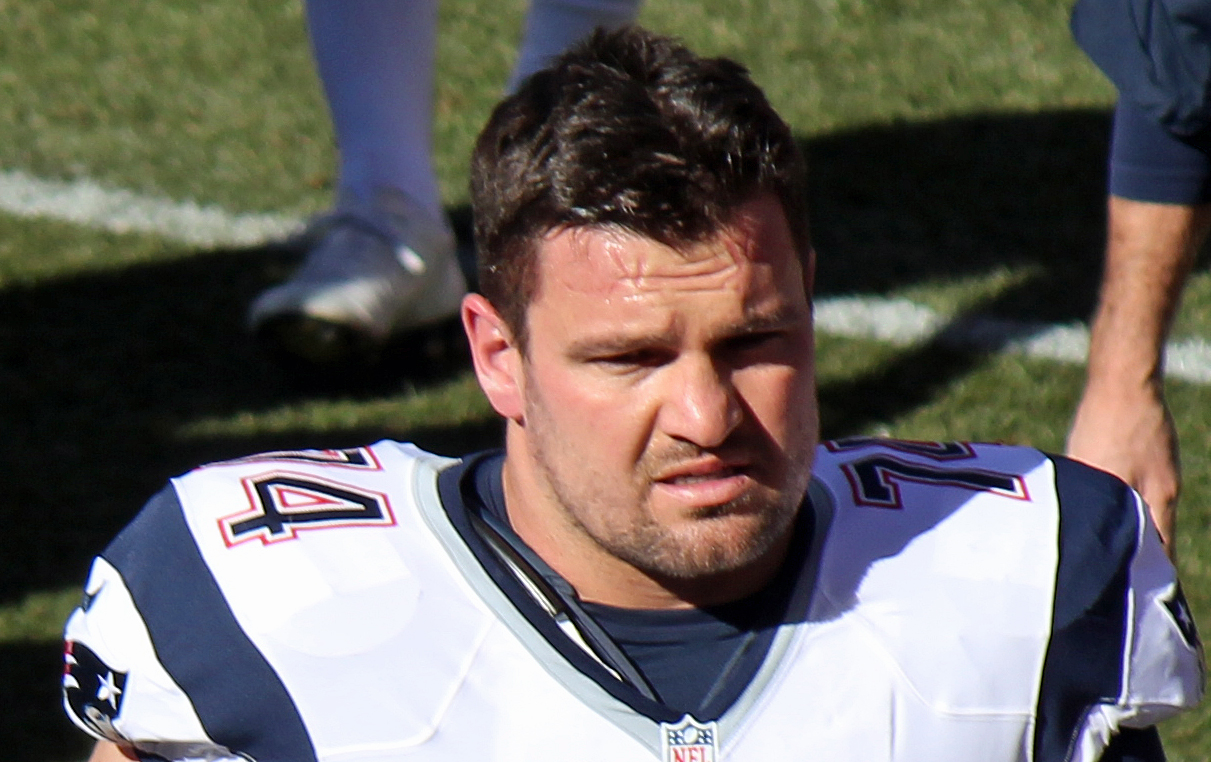
- Svitek with the New England Patriots in 2013

No. 71, 74, 76
- Positions: Offensive tackle, offensive guard

Personal information
- Born: January 8, 1982 (age 44); Prague, Czechoslovakia
- Listed height: 6 ft 7 in (2.01 m)
- Listed weight: 305 lb (138 kg)

Career information
- High school: Newbury Park (Newbury Park, California, U.S.)
- College: Stanford
- NFL draft: 2005: 6th round, 187th overall pick

Career history
- Kansas City Chiefs (2005–2007); → Frankfurt Galaxy (2006); Atlanta Falcons (2009–2012); New England Patriots (2013); Cincinnati Bengals (2014)*; Tennessee Titans (2014)
- * Offseason or practice squad member only

Awards and highlights
- World Bowl champion (XIV)

Career NFL statistics
- Games played: 79
- Games started: 21
- Stats at Pro Football Reference

Will Svitek (born January 8, 1982, as Vilém Svítek) is a former American football offensive tackle and offensive guard that played for the National Football League (NFL). He was selected by the Kansas City Chiefs in the sixth round of the 2005 NFL draft. He played college football at Stanford.

Svitek was also a member of the Atlanta Falcons, New England Patriots, Cincinnati Bengals and Tennessee Titans.

== College career ==
Svitek played in 88 games (18 starts) at Stanford University, where he played defensive end and tight end. He recorded 60 tackles, 4.5 tackles for loss, 2.0 sacks, one forced fumble, and an interception. He graduated in 2004 with a degree in political science and a minor in communications.

== Professional career ==
=== Kansas City Chiefs ===
Svitek joined the Chiefs as the first of the club's two sixth-round selections (187th overall) in the 2005 NFL draft. 2005—Sixth-round Kansas City draft choice played in one game, November 6 vs. Oakland, and was on roster as game day inactive for the other 15 contests ... Was converted to OL after playing DE in college. 2006—Played in spring for Frankfurt Galaxy of NFL Europe, helping team to World Bowl championship and league rushing title ... Played in two games for Kansas City before being played on Reserve/Injured list with knee injury on October 28. 2007—His four starts came in the season's last four games... First career start was December 9 at Denver

=== Atlanta Falcons ===
Svitek was signed by the Atlanta Falcons on February 12, 2009. Signed a two-year extension in 2011 with a $1.26 million signing bonus, making $2 million in 2011 and $1.75 million in 2012.

2009—Signed with Atlanta as free agent and played in 13 games with two starts for 9–7 team. 2010—Played in all 16 games for Atlanta's 13-3 NFC South championship team, and credited with a start in Divisional playoff vs. Green Bay when he took opening snap as an extra blocking TE. 2011—Played in every game, with 10 starts at LOT, for Falcons team that earned Wild Card playoff spot with 10–6 record ... Started at LOT in playoff at N.Y. Giants ... Took over as starting LOT as an injury replacement on October 23 at Detroit and did not relinquish the spot, credited in coaches' statistics with allowing only 1.5 sacks on 376 pass plays as a starter ... Aided QB Matt Ryan's performance of 29 TD passes with just 12 INTs. 2012—Spent entire season on Atlanta's reserve/injured list, due to arm injury.

=== New England Patriots ===
On March 17, 2013, Svitek signed with the New England Patriots. He signed a one-year contract for $1 million

2013: Signed with New England as unrestricted free agent (from Atlanta) and helped Patriots to a 12–4 season and berth in AFC Championship game (lost to Denver) ... Inactive for Games 1-3 due to injury and played in last 13 regular-season games, plus both postseason contests ... Patriots were winners in his two starts at ROT as an injury replacement, averaging 30.5 points in wins December 1 at Houston and December 8 vs. Cleveland ... Also saw significant action at ROT in 34–31 win November 24 vs. Denver.

=== Cincinnati Bengals ===
On June 11, 2014, Svitek signed with the Cincinnati Bengals.

Ninth-year pro joins Bengals as a free agent in 2014 ... Played in 13 games with two starts for New England last season, and also played in both of the Patriots' postseason games ... Has played in 74 NFL games with 18 starts in regular season and four games with two starts in postseason ... Prior to 2013, played with Kansas City (2005–07) and Atlanta (2009–12).

=== Tennessee Titans ===
On October 14, 2014, he was signed by the Tennessee Titans to replace the roster spot of Michael Roos who was put on IR.

== Retirement ==
He retired after the 2014 season with the Titans.

== Personal life ==
Svitek was born in Prague and moved to the United States with his family at age 2.

He has participated in NFL Business Management and Entrepreneurial Programs at Harvard Business School, the Wharton School of Business (at the University of Pennsylvania), the Kellogg School of Management (Northwestern), Notre Dame Business School, Stanford Business School, and most recently attended classes at Wharton's San Francisco campus this past off-season.

Svitek has been an active supporter of military appreciation, working on several projects with the USO and the Wounded Warrior Project, as well as visiting military stationed overseas.
