= Chad Beasley =

American football player (born 1978)

No. 68, 74
- Position: Offensive guard

Personal information
- Born: November 13, 1978; Upper St. Clair Township, Pennsylvania, U.S.
- Listed height: 6 ft 5 in (1.96 m)
- Listed weight: 300 lb (136 kg)

Career information
- High school: Gate City (Gate City, Virginia)
- College: Virginia Tech (1997–2001)
- NFL draft: 2002: 7th round, 218th overall pick

Career history
- Minnesota Vikings (2002)*; Cleveland Browns (2002–2004); Houston Texans (2005)*; Carolina Panthers (2006)*; → Berlin Thunder (2006)
- * Offseason or practice squad member only

Career NFL statistics
- Games played: 8
- Games started: 3
- Stats at Pro Football Reference

Thomas Chad Beasley (born November 13, 1978) is an American former professional football player who was an offensive guard for the Cleveland Browns of the National Football League (NFL). He played college football for the Virginia Tech Hokies and was selected by the Minnesota Vikings in the seventh round of the 2002 NFL draft. He was also a member of the Houston Texans and Carolina Panthers.

== Early life ==
Beasley was born in Upper St. Clair Township, Pennsylvania. He played high school football at Gate City High School in Gate City, Virginia, earning all-state honors. His father Tom Beasley also played for Virginia Tech and in the NFL.

== College career ==
Beasley played college football for the Virginia Tech Hokies from 1997 to 2001 as a defensive lineman. He was redshirted in 1997. He earned All-Big East honors twice.

== Professional career ==
Beasley was selected by the Minnesota Vikings in the seventh round, with the 218th overall pick, of the 2002 NFL draft. He officially signed with the team on July 19. He was waived on August 27 and signed to the practice squad on September 4, 2002.

On October 1, 2002, the Cleveland Browns signed Beasley off of the Vikings' practice squad. He played in eight games, starting three, at guard for the Browns during the 2003 season, before being placed on injured reserve on December 9, 2003. He re-signed with the Browns on April 28, 2004. Beasley was placed on injured reserve again on August 30, 2004. He was waived on December 13, 2004.

Beasley signed a reserve/future contract with the Houston Texans on January 31, 2005. He was waived on September 3, 2005.

Beasley signed a reserve/future contract with the Carolina Panthers on January 5, 2006. He was allocated to NFL Europe to play for the Berlin Thunder in 2006. He started all 10 games for the Thunder during the 2006 NFL Europe season. Beasley was waived by the Panthers on September 2, 2006.
