= Josh Cooper (defensive end) =

American football player (born 1980)

Joshua Cooper
No. 76, 97, 92
- Position: Defensive end

Personal information
- Born: December 5, 1980 (age 45); Lanett, Alabama, U.S.
- Listed height: 6 ft 4 in (1.93 m)
- Listed weight: 270 lb (122 kg)

Career information
- High school: Marietta (GA)
- College: Mississippi
- NFL draft: 2004: undrafted

Career history
- San Francisco 49ers (2004); Frankfurt Galaxy (2006); Buffalo Bills (2006)*; New Orleans Saints (2006–2007); Florida Tuskers (2009); Las Vegas Locomotives (2010–2011)
- * Offseason or practice squad member only

Awards and highlights
- UFL champion (2010); World Bowl champion (XIV)

Career NFL statistics
- Total tackles: 24
- Sacks: 1.5
- Forced fumbles: 1
- Pass deflections: 1
- Stats at Pro Football Reference

Joshua Martez Cooper (born December 5, 1980) is an American former professional football player who was a defensive end in the National Football League (NFL). He was signed by the San Francisco 49ers as an undrafted free agent in 2004. He played college football for the Ole Miss Rebels.

Cooper was also a member of the Frankfurt Galaxy, Buffalo Bills, New Orleans Saints and Florida Tuskers.

== Professional career ==
=== San Francisco 49ers ===
In 2004, Cooper started his career with the 49ers. In the preseason, he recorded a team high 3 sacks. By the beginning of the regular season the 49ers signed him to their practice squad. On Sept. 26, Cooper saw his first regular season action, in a backup role, against the Seattle Seahawks. He played in two games during the 2004 season. He was released on Aug 28, 2005.

=== Frankfurt Galaxy ===
In 2006, Cooper played for the Frankfurt Galaxy. He started all ten games and posted 26 tackles and 3 sacks in the regular season. He recorded 2 sack in the Galaxy's World Bowl Championship Win, tying the World Bowl Game record.

=== Buffalo Bills ===
On June 6, 2006 after returning from Frankfurt, Cooper signed with the Bills. He was released Aug 28 2006, before the start of the regular season.

=== New Orleans Saints ===
In October 2006 Cooper Signed with the Saints and was added to their practice squad. On December 3 against his former team, the 49ers, he recorded his first NFL sack, tackle, forced fumble and tip ball. After that game he remained active and made his first NFL start on December 31, against the Panthers. He recorded a career high 6 tackles among other stats. He also played in the NFC Championship game that year and recorded 4 tackles. In 2007, Cooper had another solid year with the Saints. He started in 4 Games and participated in 13 of 16 games. After the 2007 season Cooper underwent a Bilateral Achilles Tendon surgery and was unable to participate in the 2008 season. He was released before training camp in 2008.

=== Florida Tuskers ===
Cooper was signed by the Florida Tuskers of the United Football League on August 17, 2009.
