= Niklos =

Niklos is a surname. Notable people with the surname include:

- Calix Niklos, character on V Wars
- J. R. Niklos (born 1979), American football fullback
