= Corey Chamblin =

American gridiron football player and coach (born 1977)

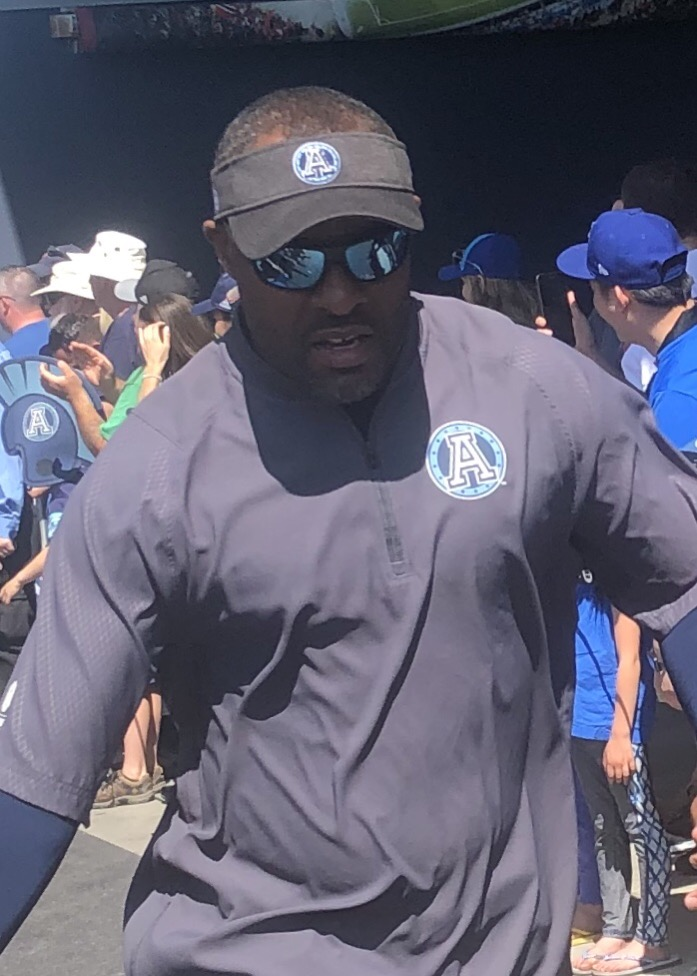
- Chamblin before a Toronto Argonauts game in 2019

Arizona State
- Title: Senior Offensive Analyst

Personal information
- Born: May 29, 1977 (age 49); Birmingham, Alabama, U.S.
- Listed height: 5 ft 10 in (1.78 m)
- Listed weight: 188 lb (85 kg)

Career information
- Position: Cornerback (No. 23)
- High school: Ensley (AL)
- College: Tennessee Tech
- NFL draft: 1999: undrafted

Career history

Playing
- Baltimore Ravens (1999)*; Jacksonville Jaguars (1999–2000); Green Bay Packers (2001)*; Tampa Bay Buccaneers (2002)*; Denver Broncos (2003)*; Rhein Fire (2004); Indianapolis Colts (2004)*
- * Offseason or practice squad member only

Coaching
- Frankfurt Galaxy (2006) Assistant defensive backs coach; Winnipeg Blue Bombers (2007) Defensive backs coach; Calgary Stampeders (2008–2010) Defensive backs coach; Hamilton Tiger-Cats (2011) Defensive coordinator & defensive backs coach; Saskatchewan Roughriders (2012–2015) Head coach; Toronto Argonauts (2017) Defensive coordinator, defensive backs coach, & assistant head coach; Arkansas (2018) Defensive backs coach & quality control; Toronto Argonauts (2019) Head coach; Birmingham Stallions (2022) Defensive backs coach; San Antonio Brahmas (2023) Defensive backs coach; Birmingham Stallions (2024–2025) Defensive coordinator & safeties coach; St. Louis Battlehawks (2026) Defensive coordinator; Arizona State (2026-present) Senior Offensive Analyst

Awards and highlights
- World Bowl champion (XIV); 3× Grey Cup champion (2008, 2013, 2017); USFL champion (2022); UFL champion (2024); 2013 CFL Coach of the Year; UFL Assistant Coach of the Year (2026)
- Stats at Pro Football Reference

Corey Jermaine Chamblin (born May 29, 1977) is an American football coach who is the senior offensive analyst at Arizona State. He previously served as the defensive coordinator for the St. Louis Battlehawks of the United Football League (UFL). He is a former professional gridiron football defensive back and was signed by the Baltimore Ravens of the National Football League (NFL) as an undrafted free agent in 1999. He played college football at Tennessee Tech. As a player, Chamblin has also been a member of the Jacksonville Jaguars, Green Bay Packers, Tampa Bay Buccaneers, Denver Broncos, Rhein Fire, and Indianapolis Colts.

He was head coach of the Saskatchewan Roughriders of the Canadian Football League (CFL) from 2012 to part-way through 2015. He won the 101st Grey Cup and was awarded the Annis Stukus Trophy, given to the CFL's Coach of the Year, in 2013.

== College career ==
Chamblin was a preseason All-Ohio Valley Conference selection his senior year at Tennessee Tech. He played in 43 games with 35 starts, totaling 161 tackles, three interceptions, eight passes defensed and two blocked punts.

== Professional career ==
=== Baltimore Ravens ===
Chamblin signed with the Baltimore Ravens as an undrafted free agent, but was waived on September 5.

=== Jacksonville Jaguars ===
Chamblin signed with the Jacksonville Jaguars' practice squad on September 7, before being released on September 21 and signed to the active roster. He appeared in eleven regular season games for the Jaguars, all on special teams, where he notched three special teams tackles and blocked a punt in a divisional playoff game against the Miami Dolphins.

=== Green Bay Packers ===
On August 3, 2001, the Green Bay Packers signed Chamblin.

=== Tampa Bay Buccaneers ===
On January 28, 2002, Chamblin signed with the Tampa Bay Buccaneers.

=== Denver Broncos ===
On January 6, 2003 the Denver Broncos signed Chamblin to a future contract. On August 22, 2003, he was waived by the Broncos.

=== Rhein Fire ===
In 2004, Chamblin signed with the Rhein Fire of NFL Europa.

=== Indianapolis Colts ===
On August 10, 2004, Chamblin signed with the Indianapolis Colts. On September 5, 2004, he was cut by the Colts.

== Coaching career ==
=== Early years ===
Chamblin began his coaching career with the Frankfurt Galaxy of NFL Europe in 2006 before joining the Winnipeg Blue Bombers of the Canadian Football League in 2007 as the defensive backs coach. He then spent three seasons with the Calgary Stampeders in the same capacity while winning his first Grey Cup championship in 2008. He was then hired as the defensive coordinator of the Hamilton Tiger-Cats for the 2011 CFL season.

=== Saskatchewan Roughriders ===
On December 15, 2011, Chamblin was hired as the head coach of the Saskatchewan Roughriders. On November 10, 2013, Chamblin won his first CFL head coaching career playoff game, a 29–25 win over the BC Lions. On November 17, 2013, Chamblin won the West Final over the Calgary Stampeders, taking the Roughriders to the Grey Cup, which they won on November 25, the first time in his head coaching career.

In January 2014, Chamblin, along with Hamilton Tiger Cats head coach Kent Austin and Calgary Stampeders head coach John Hufnagel, was nominated for 2013 Coach of The Year. On February 5, 2014, it was announced Chamblin won the award.

On August 31, 2015, after leading the Roughriders to an 0–9 start, Chamblin was fired and relieved of his head coaching duties along with general manager Brendan Taman.

=== Toronto Argonauts (first stint) ===
On March 7, 2017, Chamblin was named defensive coordinator, defensive backs coach, and assistant head coach for the Toronto Argonauts. The Argonauts won the Grey Cup for that 2017 season, Chamblin's third Grey Cup win as a coach.

=== Arkansas ===
In June 2018, Chamblin was hired as a defensive backs quality control coach at the University of Arkansas.

=== Toronto Argonauts (second stint) ===
Following the firing of Marc Trestman after the 2018 season, Chamblin was named head coach of the Argonauts on December 10, 2018. After a 4–14 season in 2019, Chamblin was fired.

=== San Antonio Brahmas ===
Chamblin was officially hired by the San Antonio Brahmas on September 13, 2022.

=== Birmingham Stallions ===
Chamblin was hired by the Birmingham Stallions on January 9, 2024. He was promoted to defensive coordinator on May 28, 2024.

=== St. Louis Battlehawks ===
Chamblin was hired by the St. Louis Battlehawks on January 29, 2026.

=== Arizona State ===
Prior to the 2026 season, Chamblin was hired as the senior offensive analyst at Arizona State under Kenny Dillingham.

== CFL coaching record ==
Team	Year	Regular season					Postseason		
Team	Year	Won	Lost	Ties	Win %	Finish	Won	Lost	Result
SSK	2012	8	10	0	.444	3rd in West Division	0	1	Lost West Semi-Final
SSK	2013	11	7	0	.611	2nd in West Division	3	0	Won Grey Cup
SSK	2014	10	8	0	.555	3rd in West Division	0	1	Lost West Semi-Final
SSK	2015	0	9	0	.000	5th in West Division	-	-	Fired
TOR	2019	4	14	0	.222	4th in East Division	-	-	Failed to Qualify
Total		33	48	0	.407	0 Division; Championships	3	2	1 Grey Cup
