= Sean McHugh =

American football player (born 1982)

No. 85, 49
- Position: Tight end

Personal information
- Born: May 27, 1982 (age 44); Springfield, Massachusetts, U.S.
- Listed height: 6 ft 5 in (1.96 m)
- Listed weight: 265 lb (120 kg)

Career information
- High school: Chagrin Falls (Chagrin Falls, Ohio)
- College: Penn State
- NFL draft: 2004: 7th round, 241st overall pick

Career history
- Tennessee Titans (2004)*; Green Bay Packers (2004); Detroit Lions (2005–2007); Frankfurt Galaxy (2006); Pittsburgh Steelers (2008–2009)
- * Offseason or practice squad member only

Awards and highlights
- Super Bowl champion (XLIII); World Bowl champion (XIV)

Career NFL statistics
- Receptions: 23
- Receiving yards: 301
- Stats at Pro Football Reference

Sean Thomas McHugh (born May 27, 1982) is an American former professional football player who was a tight end in the National Football League (NFL). He played college football for the Penn State Nittany Lions. He was a member of the Pittsburgh Steelers in the NFL, winning Super Bowl XLIII.

== Early life ==
McHugh played running back and linebacker from 1996 to 1999 at Chagrin Falls High School in Chagrin Falls, Ohio, where he was a four-year letterman. Upon his graduation in 2000, McHugh had set single season (2,260 yards) and career (5,855 yards) rushing records that still stand at Chagrin Falls.

He also lettered in wrestling his freshman and sophomore years.

== College career ==
McHugh was a four-year letterman at Penn State from 2000 to 2003, starting at fullback his junior and senior seasons. During his career, McHugh ran 82 times for 322 yards and 6 touchdowns. He also made 44 catches for 297 yards and one touchdown.

== Professional career ==
Pre-draft measurables
Height	Weight	Arm length	Hand span	40-yard dash	10-yard split	20-yard split	20-yard shuttle	Three-cone drill	Vertical jump	Broad jump	Bench press
6 ft 5 1/8 in (1.96 m)	264 lb (120 kg)	31 3/4 in (0.81 m)	9 1/2 in (0.24 m)	4.97 s	1.75 s	2.94 s	4.09 s	7.36 s	29.0 in (0.74 m)	9 ft 7 in (2.92 m)	18 reps
All values from NFL Combine

=== Tennessee Titans ===
McHugh was selected by the Tennessee Titans in 2004, in the seventh round (241st overall). He was cut at the end of training camp.

=== Green Bay Packers ===
McHugh signed with the Green Bay Packers as a free agent. He made his NFL debut in the Packers' September 13, 2004 game at Carolina.

=== Detroit Lions ===
The next season, McHugh signed a free agent contract with the Detroit Lions. He saw action in 3 games that season. The Lions allocated him to the Frankfurt Galaxy for NFL Europa's 2006 season. He would play in Frankfurt's World Bowl XIV victory over the Amsterdam Admirals.

McHugh returned to Detroit for the 2006 NFL season. He was momentarily elevated to the #1 tight end slot due to a wrist injury to Casey FitzSimmons in the preseason, but found himself on the team's practice squad at the start of the season. A week 7 injury to fullback Cory Schlesinger moved McHugh back onto the active roster as a fullback on October 22, 2006. McHugh saw action at fullback on that week versus the New York Jets. His first career reception came against the Atlanta Falcons on November 5, 2006 for seven yards. He would appear in 6 games in 2006, starting 3, and finishing with 3 receptions for 25 yards.

McHugh saw increased playing time in 2007, mostly back at tight end. He played in 15 games and finished the season with 252 yards on 17 receptions. He was released by the Lions on August 31, 2008 at the end of training camp.

=== Pittsburgh Steelers ===
McHugh signed with the Pittsburgh Steelers on September 3, 2008. He would dress for the Steelers' week 2 game versus Cleveland. An ankle injury to Carey Davis prompted McHugh's move to fullback, where he would be the starter for the Steelers' week 7 game versus Cincinnati. He would be used primarily as a fullback for the remainder of the season and throughout the playoffs, making 3 receptions, totaling 24 yards. In his first season at Pittsburgh, McHugh won the AFC Championship and ultimately Super Bowl XLIII, earning McHugh his first Super Bowl ring.

During the two-week period leading up to the Super Bowl, McHugh gained notoriety for having been cut by the Lions, deemed not good enough to play on a team that ultimately went 0-16 for the season, but good enough to play on a Super Bowl team such as Pittsburgh and make major contributions as a blocker for Willie Parker and Ben Roethlisberger.

== Personal life ==
McHugh and his wife Ashlee reside in the suburbs of Detroit. with their son Jack and daughter Emma. McHugh is now an assistant football coach at South Lyon East High School in South Lyon, where he is the offensive line and defensive line coach and also serves as special teams coordinator.

Sean is also an assistant vice president of sales at United Wholesale Mortgage.
