= Kevin Carberry =

American football player and coach (born 1983)

Tampa Bay Buccaneers
- Title: Offensive line coach

Personal information
- Born: May 19, 1983 (age 43); Oak Lawn, Illinois, U.S.
- Listed height: 6 ft 4 in (1.93 m)
- Listed weight: 275 lb (125 kg)

Career information
- Position: Defensive lineman
- High school: St. Rita (Chicago, Illinois)
- College: Ohio (2002-2005)
- NFL draft: 2005: undrafted

Career history

Playing
- Cleveland Browns (2005)*; Detroit Lions (2005–2006)*; Berlin Thunder (2006); Carolina Panthers (2006)*; New York Dragons (2007); Philadelphia Soul (2008)
- * Offseason or practice squad member only

Coaching
- St. Ignatius College Prep (IL) (2007–2008) Defensive coordinator & special teams coach; Kansas (2009–2011) Graduate assistant; Stephen F. Austin (2012–2013) Defensive ends coach; Dallas Cowboys (2014–2015) Offensive assistant; Washington Redskins (2016–2017) Assistant offensive line coach; Stanford (2018–2020) Run game coordinator & offensive line coach; Los Angeles Rams (2021–2022) Offensive line coach; New Orleans Saints (2023) Assistant offensive line coach; Tampa Bay Buccaneers (2024) Offensive line coach; Tampa Bay Buccaneers (2025–present) Offensive line coach & run game coordinator

Awards and highlights
- As a coach: Super Bowl champion (LVI); As a player: ArenaBowl champion (2008); Second-team All-MAC (2004)

Career AFL statistics
- Total tackles: 21
- Sacks: 3
- Forced fumbles: 1
- Stats at ArenaFan.com

Kevin Carberry (born May 19, 1983) is an American football coach and former player who is the offensive line coach for the Tampa Bay Buccaneers of the National Football League (NFL). He played college football for the Ohio Bobcats prior to playing professionally, spending time as a member of the Detroit Lions, Berlin Thunder of NFL Europe, New York Dragons and the Philadelphia Soul of the Arena Football League (AFL).

== College career ==
Carberry played defensive end and was a four-year letterman at Ohio, where he was named a second-team All-MAC selection in 2004 as a team captain.He graduated from Ohio in 2005 with a degree in marketing.

== Professional career ==
After going undrafted in the 2005 NFL draft, Carberry attended the Cleveland Browns training camp but did not make the roster. He was signed to the Detroit Lions practice squad for the remainder of the 2005 season. After a stint with the Berlin Thunder of NFL Europe in spring 2006, Carberry attended the training camp of the Carolina Panthers but was not signed. After spending 2007 with the New York Dragons of the Arena Football League, Carberry joined the Philadelphia Soul in 2008, and was a member of the Soul when they captured ArenaBowl XXII in 2008.

== Coaching career ==
Carberry coached at St. Ignatius College Prep in Chicago during the Arena Football League offseasons as the program's defensive coordinator and special teams coach. At the conclusion of his playing career, he joined the coaching staff at Kansas Jayhawks as a graduate assistant, earning a master’s degree in sports administration in 2010. He was hired as the defensive ends coach for Stephen F. Austin in 2012, where he spent two seasons before entering the NFL coaching ranks.

=== Dallas Cowboys ===
Carberry joined the Dallas Cowboys coaching staff in 2014 as an offensive assistant.

=== Washington Redskins ===
Carberry departed to join the Washington Redskins in 2016 as their assistant offensive line coach under former Cowboys offensive coordinator Bill Callahan.

=== Stanford ===
Carberry was named the run game coordinator and offensive line coach at Stanford in 2018.

=== Los Angeles Rams ===
Carberry was hired as the offensive line coach for the Los Angeles Rams in 2021, reuniting him with former Washington offensive coordinator Sean McVay. In Carberry's first season with the Rams, they won Super Bowl LVI against the Cincinnati Bengals. He was fired on January 18, 2023.

=== New Orleans Saints ===
On February 15, 2023, the New Orleans Saints hired Carberry as their assistant offensive line coach.

=== Tampa Bay Buccaneers ===
On February 14, 2024, Carberry was named as the offensive line coach for the Tampa Bay Buccaneers.
