= Mike Jones (wide receiver, born 1960) =

American football player and coach (born 1960)

No. 89, 86
- Position: Wide receiver

Personal information
- Born: April 14, 1960 (age 66); Chattanooga, Tennessee, U.S.
- Listed height: 5 ft 11 in (1.80 m)
- Listed weight: 181 lb (82 kg)

Career information
- High school: Riverside (Chattanooga)
- College: Tennessee State
- NFL draft: 1983: 6th round, 159th overall pick

Career history

Playing
- Minnesota Vikings (1983–1985); New Orleans Saints (1986–1987); Kansas City Chiefs (1988); New England Patriots (1989)*; New Orleans Saints (1989)
- * Offseason or practice squad member only

Coaching
- Rhein Fire (1998–2000) Wide receivers coach; Orlando Rage (2001) Wide receivers coach; Rhein Fire (2002–2003) Offensive coordinator; Frankfurt Galaxy (2004–2007) Head coach; Toronto Argonauts (2009) Receivers coach; Tennessee State (2010–2014) Offensive coordinator; Lake Minneola HS (FL) (c. 2015) Assistant coach; East Central CC (2018) Running backs and tight ends coach; East Central CC (2019) Offensive coordinator; Birmingham Stallions (2022–2025) Wide receivers coach

Awards and highlights
- 3× World Bowl champion (VI, VIII, XIV); 2× USFL champion (2022, 2023); UFL champion (2024); NFL Europe Coach of the Year (2006)

Career NFL statistics
- Receptions: 165
- Receiving yards: 2,372
- Receiving touchdowns: 11
- Stats at Pro Football Reference

Michael Anthony Jones (born April 14, 1960) is an American former professional football player and coach who recently served as the wide receivers coach for the Birmingham Stallions of the United Football League (UFL). He played as a wide receiver in the National Football League (NFL) for seven season with five different teams: the Minnesota Vikings (1983–1985), New Orleans Saints (1986–1987), Kansas City Chiefs (1988), New England Patriots (1989), and New Orleans Saints (1989). Jones played college football at Tennessee State University and returned to his alma mater to serve as offensive coordinator from 2010 to 2014.

== Playing career ==
Born in Chattanooga, Tennessee, Jones graduated from Riverside High School in Chattanooga. He played college football at Tennessee State University. Jones was selected by the Minnesota Vikings in the 6th round (159th overall) of the 1983 NFL Draft. Jones had a seven-year career as a National Football League wide receiver from 1983 to 1989, playing with the Minnesota Vikings and the New Orleans Saints.

== Coaching career ==
Jones is currently with the USFL Birmingham Stallions as the wide receivers coach. In 2022 and 2023, the Birmingham Stallions were named the world champions.

He began his pro coaching career as an assistant coach with the Rhein Fire of NFL Europa. As an assistant, he spent five years with the Fire in two spells, reaching the World Bowl on four occasions. From 1998 to 2000 he was the team's wide receivers coach, with the Rhein winning the league championship in 1998 and 2000.

Jones spent the 2001 season as an assistant with Galen Hall's Orlando Rage of the XFL.

After a one-year hiatus, Jones returned to the Fire as offensive coordinator in 2002. The Fire returned to the World Bowl in 2002 and 2003, losing to German rivals Berlin and Frankfurt.

Following Galaxy head coach Doug Graber's resignation following the 2003 season, Jones was named Graber's replacement. In his four seasons as Frankfurt's head coach, Jones guided the team to the World Bowl three times, winning World Bowl XIV in 2006. The league subsequently folded following the 2007 season.

On November 28, 2007, Jones was named head coach of Team Alabama of the All American Football League. However, the league's inaugural season was postponed for financial reasons.

On February 2, 2009, Jones was named the receivers coach for the Toronto Argonauts of the Canadian Football League (CFL).

== Personal life ==
Jones is married and has three children; his son Chandler Jones played college football at San Jose State and later went on to the CFL.
