= Christian Mohr =

American football player (born 1980)

Profile
- Position: Defensive end

Personal information
- Born: April 5, 1980 (age 46); Aachen, West Germany
- Listed height: 6 ft 6 in (1.98 m)
- Listed weight: 251 lb (114 kg)

Career history
- Düsseldorf Panther (2001–2004); Berlin Thunder (2004); Seattle Seahawks (2004–2005)*; Berlin Thunder (2005); Seattle Seahawks (2005)*; Berlin Thunder (2006); Philadelphia Eagles (2006)*; Rhein Fire (2007); Cleveland Browns (2008–2009)*; Kiel Baltic Hurricanes (2009–2010); Mönchengladbach Mavericks (2010)
- * Offseason or practice squad member only

Awards and highlights
- World Bowl Champion Berlin Thunder 2004; All-NFL Europe (2005); All-NFL Europe (2006); Fan award Berlin Thunder (2005;2006); Defense MVP Rhein Fire (2007)

Christian Mohr (born April 5, 1980) is an American football defensive end who played for the Seattle Seahawks, Philadelphia Eagles and Cleveland Browns of the National Football League.

Mohr was signed by the Düsseldorf Panther in 2001 to play in the GFL. He started playing football at the age of 19. Five years later, Mohr signed a two-year contract with the Seattle Seahawks in 2005, despite never having played college football in the United States.

Mohr also played for the Berlin Thunder and Rhein Fire in the NFL Europe from 2004 to 2007, won the World Bowl with Berlin Thunder 2004 and received All-NFL Europe team honors in 2005 and 2006 and Team Defense MVP honors in 2005, 2006 and 2007.

The Indianapolis Colts offered Mohr a contract for the 2007 NFL season, but an injury kept Mohr from playing. However, he kept training with his local Aachen team Grasshopper Hassenichjesehn until his injuries healed.

Mohr played for the GFL-Team Kiel Baltic Hurricanes for the second half of the 2009 season. The Mönchengladbach Mavericks signed him for the 2010 and 2011 season.
