= Mike Kracalik =

American football player (born 1982)

No. 74
- Position: Offensive tackle

Personal information
- Born: September 8, 1982 (age 44); San Diego, California, U.S.
- Listed height: 6 ft 8 in (2.03 m)
- Listed weight: 337 lb (153 kg)

Career information
- High school: El Camino (Oceanside, California)
- College: San Diego State
- NFL draft: 2005: undrafted

Career history
- New York Jets (2005)*; Baltimore Ravens (2005–2008); Rhein Fire (2006); New York Jets (2009)*; Las Vegas Locomotives (2010)*
- * Offseason or practice squad member only

Awards and highlights
- 2× Second-team All-MW (2003, 2004)

Career NFL statistics
- Games played: 4
- Stats at Pro Football Reference

Michael David Kracalik [KRAH-cha-lik] (born September 8, 1982) is an American former professional football player who was an offensive tackle in the National Football League (NFL). He was signed by the New York Jets as an undrafted free agent in 2005. He played college football for the San Diego State Aztecs.

Kracalik was also a member of the Baltimore Ravens, Rhein Fire, and Las Vegas Locomotives.
