= 2006 Berlin Thunder season =

NFL Europe team season

- General manager: Joe Cealera
- Head coach: Rick Lantz
- Home stadium: Olympic Stadium; Jahn-Sportpark

Results
- Record: 2–7–1
- Division place: 6th
- Playoffs: did not qualify

The 2006 Berlin Thunder season was the eighth season for the franchise in the NFL Europe League (NFLEL). The team was led by head coach Rick Lantz in his third year, and played its home games at Olympic Stadium and Jahn-Sportpark in Berlin, Germany. They finished the regular season in sixth place with a record of two wins, seven losses and one tie.

== Offseason ==
=== Free agent draft ===
2006 Berlin Thunder NFLEL free agent draft selections
Draft order		Player name	Position	College
Round	Choice	Player name	Position	College
1	5	A. J. Lindsay	DT	Temple
2	11	Joe Mimucci	DT	Delaware
3	14	Kevin Harrison	LB	Eastern Michigan
4	23	Willie Ford	CB	Syracuse
5	26	Little John Flowers	RB	Michigan State
6	35	Ben Moa	RB	Utah
7	38	Reggie Love	LB	Duke
8	47	Quentin Swain	LB	Florida Atlantic
9	50	Marty Johnson	RB	Utah

== Personnel ==
=== Staff ===
2006 Berlin Thunder staff
Front office: General Manager – Joe Cealera; Head coaches: Head Coach – Rick Lantz; Offensive coaches: Offensive Coordinator/Offensive Line – Don Eck; Quarterbacks/Wide Receivers – Mike Miller; National Coach/Running Backs – Wanja Müller; Tight Ends – Vince Marrow	Defensive coaches: Defensive Coordinator/Linebackers – Charles Jones; Defensive Line – Phil Banko; Defensive Backs – Bill Hurley; Assistant Defensive Backs – Dwayne Stukes; Strength and conditioning: Strength and Conditioning – Matt Pippin

=== Roster ===
2006 Berlin Thunder final roster
Quarterbacks: 12 Lang Campbell; 2 B. J. Symons; 4 Brian Wrobel; Running backs: 45 Jonathan Evans; 24 Derek Farmer; 31 Little John Flowers; 34 Marty Johnson; 46 Ben Moa; Wide receivers: 82 Keron Henry; 85 C. J. Jones; 16 Brandon Middleton; 87 Lance Moore; 84 Rich Musinski; 15 Curtis Williams; Tight ends: 81 Jason Randall	Offensive linemen: 74 Chad Beasley G; 65 Toby Cecil G/C; 78 Mike Erickson G; 72 Patrick Estes T; 76 Julius Franklin G; 75 Tom Kaleita T; 57 Joel Rodriguez C; Defensive linemen: 98 Kevin Carberry DT; 90 Jason Davis DT; 93 Jeff Green DE; 94 Ryan Hoffman DT; 73 Carlos Joseph DT; 91 Elton Patterson DE; 95 Sam Taulealea DT	Linebackers: 54 Kevin Harrison OLB/MLB; 55 Malcolm Postell MLB; 51 Quentin Swain MLB; 57 Jermaine Taylor OLB; 56 Andre Torrey OLB; Defensive backs: 22 Ryan Bowers CB; 27 Jamaal Brimmer SS; 36 Hiram Eugene CB/S; 33 Anthony Floyd FS; 23 Jason Harmon CB; 21 Robert Redd CB; 20 Antwaun Rogers CB; 25 Duvol Thompson SS; 26 James Thornton CB; Special teams: 3 Xavier Beitia K; 1 Brian Simnjanovski P	National players: 89 (Finland) Klaus Alinen TE; 29 (Germany) Oliver Flemming SS; 88 (Mexico) Alejandro Gamez WR; 66 (Japan) Masakazu Goda C/G; 48 (Mexico) Jonathan Hurtado OLB; 38 (Russia) Sergey Ivanov FS; 99 (England) Lorn Mayers DT; 92 (Germany) Christian Mohr DE; 86 (Germany) Sebastian Schneider TE; 18 (Mexico) Gustavo Tella WR; 97 (England) Daniel Watts DT/DE; Rookies in italics

== Schedule ==
Week	Date	Kickoff (Note: All times are in Central European Time (CET), or Central European Summer Time (CEST) after March 25.)	Opponent	Results		Game site	Attendance
Week	Date	Kickoff	Opponent	Final score	Team record	Game site	Attendance
1	Saturday, March 18	7:00 p.m.	at Amsterdam Admirals	W 33–29	1–0–0	Amsterdam ArenA	16,341
2	Saturday, March 25	6:00 p.m.	Rhein Fire	L 0–22	1–1–0	Olympic Stadium	13,105
3	Saturday, April 1	6:00 p.m.	at Hamburg Sea Devils	T 17–17 ^{OT}	1–1–1	AOL Arena	15,837
4	Saturday, April 8	6:00 p.m.	Amsterdam Admirals	L 31–38	1–2–1	Olympic Stadium	11,443
5	Monday, April 17	6:00 p.m.	Cologne Centurions	W 24–13	2–2–1	Olympic Stadium	13,559
6	Saturday, April 22	7:00 p.m.	at Frankfurt Galaxy	L 17–18	2–3–1	Commerzbank-Arena	26,812
7	Saturday, April 29	7:00 p.m.	at Rhein Fire	L 24–27	2–4–1	LTU arena	20,598
8	Sunday, May 7	4:00 p.m.	Hamburg Sea Devils	L 14–38	2–5–1	Olympic Stadium	16,762
9	Sunday, May 14	4:00 p.m.	at Cologne Centurions	L 7–25	2–6–1	RheinEnergieStadion	12,438
10	Saturday, May 20	6:00 p.m.	Frankfurt Galaxy	L 13–14	2–7–1	Jahn-Sportpark	14,225

== Standings ==
NFL Europe League
Team	W	L	T	PCT	PF	PA	Home	Road	STK
Amsterdam Admirals	7	3	0	.700	259	234	2–3–0	5–0–0	L1
Frankfurt Galaxy	7	3	0	.700	172	160	4–1–0	3–2–0	W1
Rhein Fire	6	4	0	.600	207	165	4–1–0	2–3–0	W1
Cologne Centurions	4	6	0	.400	151	170	2–3–0	2–3–0	L1
Hamburg Sea Devils	3	6	1	.350	194	193	1–3–1	2–3–0	W3
Berlin Thunder	2	7	1	.250	180	241	1–4–0	1–3–1	L5

== Game summaries ==
=== Week 1: at Amsterdam Admirals ===
Week One: Berlin Thunder at Amsterdam Admirals – Game summary

Quarter	1	2	3	4	Total
Berlin	7	13	6	7	33
Amsterdam	0	7	7	15	29

at Amsterdam ArenA, Amsterdam, Netherlands

- Date: Saturday, March 18
- Game time: 7:06 p.m. CET
- Game weather: 32 °F (0 °C), roof open, partly cloudy
- Game attendance: 16,341
- Referee: Carl Cheffers

=== Week 2: vs Rhein Fire ===
Week Two: Rhein Fire at Berlin Thunder – Game summary

Quarter	1	2	3	4	Total
Rhein	6	7	0	9	22
Berlin	0	0	0	0	0

at Olympic Stadium, Berlin, Germany

- Date: Saturday, March 25
- Game time: 6:07 p.m. CET
- Game weather: 39 °F (3.9 °C), cloudy with light rain
- Game attendance: 13,105
- Referee: Gene Steratore

=== Week 3: at Hamburg Sea Devils ===
Week Three: Berlin Thunder at Hamburg Sea Devils – Game summary

Quarter	1	2	3	4	OT	Total
Berlin	0	0	7	10	0	17
Hamburg	0	17	0	0	0	17

at AOL Arena, Hamburg, Germany

- Date: Saturday, April 1
- Game time: 6:06 p.m. CEST
- Game weather: 52 °F (11.1 °C), cloudy
- Game attendance: 15,837
- Referee: Jerome Boger

=== Week 4: vs Amsterdam Admirals ===
Week Four: Amsterdam Admirals at Berlin Thunder – Game summary

Quarter	1	2	3	4	Total
Amsterdam	7	14	14	3	38
Berlin	7	14	0	10	31

at Olympic Stadium, Berlin, Germany

- Date: Saturday, April 8
- Game time: 6:05 p.m. CEST
- Game weather: 54 °F (12.2 °C), cloudy skies
- Game attendance: 11,443
- Referee: Craig Wrolstad

=== Week 5: vs Cologne Centurions ===
Week Five: Cologne Centurions at Berlin Thunder – Game summary

Quarter	1	2	3	4	Total
Cologne	0	0	7	6	13
Berlin	0	10	7	7	24

at Olympic Stadium, Berlin, Germany

- Date: Monday, April 17
- Game time: 6:00 p.m. CEST
- Game attendance: 13,559

=== Week 6: at Frankfurt Galaxy ===
Week Six: Berlin Thunder at Frankfurt Galaxy – Game summary

Quarter	1	2	3	4	Total
Berlin	0	7	3	7	17
Frankfurt	0	3	6	9	18

at Commerzbank-Arena, Frankfurt, Germany

- Date: Saturday, April 22
- Game time: 7:10 p.m. CEST
- Game weather: 61 °F (16 °C), sunny
- Game attendance: 26,812
- Referee: John Parry

=== Week 7: at Rhein Fire ===
Week Seven: Berlin Thunder at Rhein Fire – Game summary

Quarter	1	2	3	4	Total
Berlin	0	3	7	14	24
Rhein	0	14	3	10	27

at LTU arena, Düsseldorf, Germany

- Date: Saturday, April 29
- Game time: 7:05 p.m. CEST
- Game weather: 46 °F (7.8 °C), roof closed
- Game attendance: 20,598
- Referee: Carl Cheffers

=== Week 8: vs Hamburg Sea Devils ===
Week Eight: Hamburg Sea Devils at Berlin Thunder – Game summary

Quarter	1	2	3	4	Total
Hamburg	7	14	3	14	38
Berlin	0	7	0	7	14

at Olympic Stadium, Berlin, Germany

- Date: Sunday, May 7
- Game time: 4:00 p.m.
- Game attendance: 16,762

=== Week 9: at Cologne Centurions ===
Week Nine: Berlin Thunder at Cologne Centurions – Game summary

Quarter	1	2	3	4	Total
Berlin	0	0	7	0	7
Cologne	14	3	2	6	25

at RheinEnergieStadion, Cologne, Germany

- Date: Sunday, May 14
- Game time: 4:00 p.m.
- Game attendance: 12,438

=== Week 10: vs Frankfurt Galaxy ===
Week Ten: Frankfurt Galaxy at Berlin Thunder – Game summary

Quarter	1	2	3	4	Total
Frankfurt	0	7	7	0	14
Berlin	6	7	0	0	13

at Jahn-Sportpark, Berlin, Germany

- Date: Saturday, May 20
- Game time: 6:05 p.m. CEST
- Game weather: 64 °F (18 °C), cloudy with showers, windy
- Game attendance: 14,225
- Referee: Alberto Riveron

== Honors ==
After the completion of the regular season, the All-NFL Europe League team was selected by the NFLEL coaching staffs, members of a media panel and fans voting online at NFLEurope.com. Overall, Berlin had three players selected. The selections were:

- Chad Beasley, guard
- Anthony Floyd, safety
- Christian Mohr, national player
