= Ronyell Whitaker =

American football player (1979–2026)

No. 29, 27, 39
- Position: Cornerback

Personal information
- Born: March 19, 1979; Norfolk, Virginia, U.S.
- Died: February 21, 2026 (aged 46)
- Listed height: 5 ft 9 in (1.75 m)
- Listed weight: 196 lb (89 kg)

Career information
- High school: Lake Taylor (Norfolk)
- College: Virginia Tech (1999–2002)
- NFL draft: 2003: undrafted

Career history
- Tampa Bay Buccaneers (2003–2004); Rhein Fire (2006); Minnesota Vikings (2006–2007); Detroit Lions (2008)*; Winnipeg Blue Bombers (2009)*
- * Offseason or practice squad member only

Awards and highlights
- All-NFL Europe (2006); Third-team All-American (2001)

Career NFL statistics
- Total tackles: 43
- Fumble recoveries: 1
- Pass deflections: 3
- Stats at Pro Football Reference

Ronyell Deshawn Whitaker (March 19, 1979 – February 21, 2026) was an American professional football player who was a cornerback in the National Football League (NFL). He played college football for the Virginia Tech Hokies and was signed by the NFL's Tampa Bay Buccaneers as an undrafted free agent in 2003. Whitaker played for the Minnesota Vikings, Detroit Lions, and the Canadian Football League (CFL)'s Winnipeg Blue Bombers before retiring from professional football in 2010.

== Early life ==
Ronyell Whitaker was born in Norfolk, Virginia, on March 19, 1979, the son of Sylvonia Whitaker and Woodrow Mitchell. Ronyell is the nephew of Hall Of Fame boxer Pernell 'Sweet Pea' Whitaker.

He graduated from Norfolk's Lake Taylor High School, where he "lettered four years as a running back, defensive back and return man"; he scored 84 touchdowns and ran for 6,458 yards. Whitaker was 3x All American and All Tidewater Player Of The Year.

Whitaker played college football at Virginia Tech, where he was a three-year starter "rated the No. 3 cornerback in the nation by The Sporting News [and] ranked the No. 6 cornerback by Lindy's." He was 2x Big East All Conference and an AP All American.

== Professional career ==
Pre-draft measurables
Height	Weight
5 ft 8 7/8 in (1.75 m)	196 lb (89 kg)
Values from Pro Day

In 2006, he led NFL Europe in interceptions and defensive touchdowns, with 141 return yards and two touchdowns, and was named to the All NFL Europe team. In one of his games in the NFLE in 2006, his 100-yard interception return for a score was his team's sole touchdown of the game. On February 6, 2007, the Vikings released him after 2 seasons.

Whitaker spent a brief stint with the Detroit Lions (NFL) before being released just after the end of the 2008–2009 season. Whitaker then signed with the Winnipeg Blue Bombers of the Canadian Football League. He was released on June 25, 2009.

== Career after football ==
As of 2011, Whitaker was back in Minnesota, CEO and owner of privately owned Whitaker Group LLC, Minneapolis–Saint Paul area real estate team, specializing in relocation transactions for the Vikings, as well as short sales.

== Death ==
Whitaker died on February 21, 2026, at the age of 46. He died of a brain aneurysm.
