= 2006 Rhein Fire season =

NFL Europe team season

- General manager: Sammy Schmale
- Head coach: Jim Tomsula
- Home stadium: LTU arena

Results
- Record: 6–4
- Division place: 3rd
- Playoffs: did not qualify

The 2006 Rhein Fire season was the 12th season for the franchise in the NFL Europe League (NFLEL). The team was led by head coach Jim Tomsula in his first year, and played its home games at LTU arena in Düsseldorf, Germany. They finished the regular season in third place with a record of six wins and four losses.

== Offseason ==
=== Free agent draft ===
2006 Rhein Fire NFLEL free agent draft selections
Draft order		Player name	Position	College
Round	Choice	Player name	Position	College
1	1	Ja'Waren Blair	DT	East Carolina
2	7	Ronyell Whitaker	CB	Virginia Tech
3	18	Brian Atkinson	LB	Northern Illinois
4	19	Terrence Robinson	LB	Oklahoma State
5	30	Guy Tuell	LB	Wyoming
6	31	Sacha Lancaster	DE	Arkansas
7	42	Derrick Strong	DE	Illinois
8	43	Jameel Dumas	LB	Syracuse
9	54	Johnathanio Conley	DL	Southeastern Louisiana

== Personnel ==
=== Staff ===
2006 Rhein Fire staff
Front office: General Manager – Sammy Schmale; Head coaches: Head Coach – Jim Tomsula; Offensive coaches: Offensive Coordinator/Quarterbacks – Steve Logan; Running Backs/Wide Receivers – Bob Lancaster; Offensive Line – Steve Smith; Assistant Offensive Line – Duval Love	Defensive coaches: Defensive Coordinator/Defensive Backs – Adrian White; Defensive Line – Antonio Anderson; Linebackers – Kurt Gouveia; National Coach/Defensive Backs/Special Teams – Sascha Gehloff; Strength and conditioning: Strength and Conditioning – Jeremy Holsopple

=== Roster ===
2006 Rhein Fire final roster
Quarterbacks: 3 John Bowenkamp; 14 Timmy Chang; 7 Drew Henson; Running backs: 23 Fred Jackson; 20 Jacque Lewis; Wide receivers: 88 Jeremy Carter; 84 Steven Harris; 85 Chris Samp; 87 Zuriel Smith; 81 Kendrick Starling; Tight ends: 49 Aaron Halterman; 46 Joey Hawkins; 44 Andy Stokes	Offensive linemen: 76 Harvey Dahl T; 63 Rob Hunt C; 72 Mike Kracalik T/G; 74 Nick Steitz G; 77 Brandon Torrey T; 64 Pete Traynor C; 71 Sam Wilder T/G; 68 Tony Wragge G; Defensive linemen: 99 Ja'Waren Blair DT; 93 Johnathanio Conley DT; 96 Walter Curry DT/DE; 92 Sacha Lancaster DE; 98 Brook Miller DT/DE; 97 Derrick Strong DE; 95 Zach Ville DT	Linebackers: 51 Jameel Dumas OLB; 57 Stephen Larsen OLB; 52 Terrence Robinson MLB; 58 Tyson Smith OLB; 47 Guy Tuell OLB; Defensive backs: 31 Reggie Austin CB; 21 Therrian Fontenot CB; 29 Gabriel Helms SS; 26 Mitch Meeuwsen FS; 28 Siddeeq Shabazz FS; 30 Antwain Spann CB; 33 Ronyell Whitaker CB; Special teams: 60 Kyle Andrews LS; 15 Travis Dorsch P	National players: 56 (Germany) Richard Adjei OLB; 86 (England) Marvin Allen WR; 90 (Germany) Patrick Finke DE; 8 (Sweden) Ola Kimrin K; 22 (France) Laurent Marceline RB; 45 (Germany) Alexej Mittendorf TE; 55 (England) Shaun Smith MLB; 91 (Mexico) Salomón Solano DT; 40 (Germany) Richard Yancy SS; Rookies in italics

== Schedule ==
Week	Date	Kickoff (Note: All times are in Central European Time (CET), or Central European Summer Time (CEST) after March 25.)	Opponent	Results		Game site	Attendance
Week	Date	Kickoff	Opponent	Final score	Team record	Game site	Attendance
1	Saturday, March 18	7:00 p.m.	Frankfurt Galaxy	W 10–6	1–0	LTU arena	22,827
2	Saturday, March 25	6:00 p.m.	at Berlin Thunder	W 22–0	2–0	Olympic Stadium	13,105
3	Sunday, April 2	4:00 p.m.	at Cologne Centurions	W 20–10	3–0	RheinEnergieStadion	16,961
4	Saturday, April 8	7:00 p.m.	Hamburg Sea Devils	W 31–21	4–0	LTU arena	18,224
5	Saturday, April 15	3:00 p.m.	at Amsterdam Admirals	L 31–35	4–1	Amsterdam ArenA	12,683
6	Saturday, April 22	7:00 p.m.	Amsterdam Admirals	L 21–30	4–2	LTU arena	20,118
7	Saturday, April 29	7:00 p.m.	Berlin Thunder	W 27–24	5–2	LTU arena	20,598
8	Saturday, May 6	7:00 p.m.	at Frankfurt Galaxy	L 14–16	5–3	Commerzbank-Arena	32,172
9	Sunday, May 14	4:00 p.m.	at Hamburg Sea Devils	L 10–13	5–4	AOL Arena	16,823
10	Saturday, May 20	7:00 p.m.	Cologne Centurions	W 21–10	6–4	LTU arena	28,334

== Standings ==
NFL Europe League
Team	W	L	T	PCT	PF	PA	Home	Road	STK
Amsterdam Admirals	7	3	0	.700	259	234	2–3–0	5–0–0	L1
Frankfurt Galaxy	7	3	0	.700	172	160	4–1–0	3–2–0	W1
Rhein Fire	6	4	0	.600	207	165	4–1–0	2–3–0	W1
Cologne Centurions	4	6	0	.400	151	170	2–3–0	2–3–0	L1
Hamburg Sea Devils	3	6	1	.350	194	193	1–3–1	2–3–0	W3
Berlin Thunder	2	7	1	.250	180	241	1–4–0	1–3–1	L5

== Game summaries ==
=== Week 1: vs Frankfurt Galaxy ===
Week One: Frankfurt Galaxy at Rhein Fire – Game summary

Quarter	1	2	3	4	Total
Frankfurt	3	0	3	0	6
Rhein	7	3	0	0	10

at LTU arena, Düsseldorf, Germany

- Date: Saturday, March 18
- Game time: 7:06 p.m. CET
- Game weather: 62 °F (17 °C), roof closed
- Game attendance: 22,827
- Referee: Terry Brown

Game information

First quarter

- Rhein – Juan Wong 45-yard touchdown reception from Chris Samp, Ola Kimrin kick good, 12:43.
- Frankfurt – 36-yard field goal by David Kimball, 2:59.

Second quarter

- Rhein – 42-yard field goal by Ola Kimrin, 0:34.

Third quarter

- Frankfurt – 49-yard field goal by David Kimball, 4:52.

Fourth quarter

- No scoring.

=== Week 2: at Berlin Thunder ===
Week Two: Rhein Fire at Berlin Thunder – Game summary

Quarter	1	2	3	4	Total
Rhein	6	7	0	9	22
Berlin	0	0	0	0	0

at Olympic Stadium, Berlin, Germany

- Date: Saturday, March 25
- Game time: 6:07 p.m. CET
- Game weather: 39 °F (4 °C), cloudy with light rain
- Game attendance: 13,105
- Referee: Gene Steratore

=== Week 3: at Cologne Centurions ===
Week Three: Rhein Fire at Cologne Centurions – Game summary

Quarter	1	2	3	4	Total
Rhein	7	3	7	3	20
Cologne	0	10	0	0	10

at RheinEnergieStadion, Cologne, Germany

- Date: Sunday, April 2
- Game time: 4:06 p.m. CEST
- Game weather: 55 °F (13 °C), partly cloudly
- Game attendance: 16,961
- Referee: Craig Wrolstad

=== Week 4: vs Hamburg Sea Devils ===
Week Four: Hamburg Sea Devils at Rhein Fire – Game summary

Quarter	1	2	3	4	Total
Hamburg	7	7	0	7	21
Rhein	0	7	7	17	31

at LTU arena, Düsseldorf, Germany

- Date: Saturday, April 8
- Game time: 7:05 p.m. CEST
- Game weather: 51 °F (11 °C), roof closed
- Game attendance: 18,224
- Referee: Alberto Riveron

=== Week 5: at Amsterdam Admirals ===
Week Five: Rhein Fire at Amsterdam Admirals – Game summary

Quarter	1	2	3	4	Total
Rhein	7	17	0	7	31
Amsterdam	14	7	7	7	35

at Amsterdam ArenA, Amsterdam, Netherlands

- Date: Saturday, April 15
- Game time: 3:06 p.m. CEST
- Game weather: 58 °F (14 °C), roof open, fair
- Game attendance: 12,683
- Referee: John Parry

=== Week 6: vs Amsterdam Admirals ===
Week Six: Amsterdam Admirals at Rhein Fire – Game summary

Quarter	1	2	3	4	Total
Amsterdam	14	7	6	3	30
Rhein	7	7	0	7	21

at LTU arena, Düsseldorf, Germany

- Date: Saturday, April 22
- Game time: 7:06 p.m. CEST
- Game weather: 50 °F (10 °C), roof open, mostly cloudy
- Game attendance: 20,118
- Referee: Craig Wrolstad

=== Week 7: vs Berlin Thunder ===
Week Seven: Berlin Thunder at Rhein Fire – Game summary

Quarter	1	2	3	4	Total
Berlin	0	3	7	14	24
Rhein	0	14	3	10	27

at LTU arena, Düsseldorf, Germany

- Date: Saturday, April 29
- Game time: 7:05 p.m. CEST
- Game weather: 46 °F (8 °C), roof closed
- Game attendance: 20,598
- Referee: Carl Cheffers

=== Week 8: at Frankfurt Galaxy ===
Week Eight: Rhein Fire at Frankfurt Galaxy – Game summary

Quarter	1	2	3	4	Total
Rhein	0	7	0	7	14
Frankfurt	3	3	7	3	16

at Commerzbank-Arena, Frankfurt, Germany

- Date: Saturday, May 6
- Game time: 7:04 p.m. CEST
- Game weather: 71 °F (22 °C), sunny
- Game attendance: 32,172
- Referee: Gene Steratore

=== Week 9: at Hamburg Sea Devils ===
Week Nine: Rhein Fire at Hamburg Sea Devils – Game summary

Quarter	1	2	3	4	Total
Rhein	0	7	3	0	10
Hamburg	0	3	3	7	13

at AOL Arena, Hamburg, Germany

- Date: Sunday, May 14
- Game time: 4:05 p.m. CEST
- Game weather: 59 °F (15 °C), partly cloudy
- Game attendance: 16,823
- Referee: Alberto Riveron

=== Week 10: vs Cologne Centurions ===
Week Ten: Cologne Centurions at Rhein Fire – Game summary

Quarter	1	2	3	4	Total
Cologne	7	3	0	0	10
Rhein	7	0	14	0	21

at LTU arena, Düsseldorf, Germany

- Date: Saturday, May 20
- Game time: 7:06 p.m. CEST
- Game weather: 52 °F (11 °C)
- Game attendance: 28,334
- Referee: Greg Meyer

== Honors ==
After the completion of the regular season, the All-NFL Europe League team was selected by the NFLEL coaching staffs, members of a media panel and fans voting online at NFLEurope.com. Overall, Rhein had four players selected. The selections were:

- Aaron Halterman, tight end
- Terrence Robinson, linebacker
- Derrick Strong, defensive end
- Ronyell Whitaker, cornerback
