= 2006 Hamburg Sea Devils season =

NFL Europe team season

- General manager: Kathrin Platz
- Head coach: Jack Bicknell
- Home stadium: AOL Arena

Results
- Record: 3–6–1
- Division place: 5th
- Playoffs: Did not qualify

The 2006 Hamburg Sea Devils season was the second season for the franchise in the NFL Europe League (NFLEL). The team was led by head coach Jack Bicknell in his second year, and played its home games at AOL Arena in Hamburg, Germany. They finished the regular season in fifth place with a record of three wins, six losses and one tie.

== Offseason ==
=== Free agent draft ===
2006 Hamburg Sea Devils NFLEL free agent draft selections
Draft order		Player name	Position	College
Round	Choice	Player name	Position	College
1	3	Uyi Osunde	DE	Connecticut
2	9	Rayshun Reed	CB	Troy
3	16	Jordan Kramer	LB	Idaho
4	21	Ricky Bryant	WR	Hofstra
5	28	Scott Genord	LB	Cal-Fullerton
6	33	Ivory McCoy	DE	Michigan State
7	40	Davern Williams	DT	Troy
8	45	Marcel Willis	WR	Auburn
9	52	Byron Hardmon	LB	Florida
10	56	Kevin Lewis	DT	Virginia Tech

== Personnel ==
=== Staff ===
2006 Hamburg Sea Devils (NFL Europe) staff
Front office: General Manager – Kathrin Platz; Head coaches: Head Coach – Jack Bicknell; Offensive coaches: Offensive Coordinator/Offensive Line – Vince Martino; Quarterbacks – Cory Sauter; National Coach/Running Backs/Tight Ends – Patrick Esume; Wide Receivers – Sam Rutigliano	Defensive coaches: Defensive Coordinator/Defensive Backs – Dan Daniel; Defensive Line – Denauld Brown; Linebackers – Mike Maslowski; Assistant Defensive Backs – Perry Carter; Special teams coaches: National Coach/Special Teams Coordinator – Patrick Esume; Strength and conditioning: Strength and Conditioning – Joe Mickles

=== Roster ===
2006 Hamburg Sea Devils final roster
Quarterbacks: 7 Brock Berlin; 5 James Kilian; 16 Todd Mortensen; Running backs: 20 Earl Charles; 47 Jimmy Dixon; 37 DeJuan Green; 32 Mike Jemison; Wide receivers: 81 Ricky Bryant; 89 Nate Curry; 18 Richard Smith; 84 Marcell Willis; 88 Jovan Witherspoon; Tight ends: 89 Kori Dickerson; 82 Wesley Duke; 86 Willie Walden	Offensive linemen: 64 Phil Bogle G; 73 Sean Bubin T; 71 Jon Dunn T; 74 Augie Hoffmann C; 69 Ben Johnson T; 62 Dylan McFarland T; 76 Brandon Newton C/G; 75 Kyle Takavitz G; 79 Steven Vieira G; Defensive linemen: 97 Jordan Hicks DE; 92 Kevin Lewis DT; 98 Keyonta Marshall DT; 90 Ivory McCoy DE; 95 Scott Scharff DE; 94 Tai Tupai DT; 93 Keith Wright DT	Linebackers: 55 Scott Genord OLB; 57 Kris Griffin OLB; 42 Byron Hardmon MLB; 51 Russell Rabe OLB; 40 Justin Smith OLB; Defensive backs: 39 Willie Amos CB; 34 Vontez Duff CB; 26 Eric Hill CB; 24 Chonn Lacey SS; 23 Shawn Mayer SS; 31 Rayshun Reed CB; 30 Jason Shivers FS; Special teams: 6 Adam Anderson P; 3 Tyler Jones K	National players: 91 (Norway) Anders Akerstrom OLB/DE; 21 (England) Jermaine Allen RB; 77 (Sweden) Carl-Johan Blomvall C; 54 (England) Aden Durde MLB; 72 (Germany) Bastian Lano DT; 80 (Sweden) Cristian Malm WR; 87 (England) Scott McCready WR; 27 (Germany) Claudius Osei FS; Rookies in italics

== Schedule ==
Week	Date	Kickoff (Note: All times are in Central European Time (CET), or Central European Summer Time (CEST) after March 25.)	Opponent	Results		Game site	Attendance
Week	Date	Kickoff	Opponent	Final score	Team record	Game site	Attendance
1	Saturday, March 18	6:00 p.m.	Cologne Centurions	L 10–14	0–1–0	AOL Arena	15,243
2	Saturday, March 25	7:00 p.m.	at Frankfurt Galaxy	L 14–31	0–2–0	Commerzbank-Arena	26,713
3	Saturday, April 1	6:00 p.m.	Berlin Thunder	T 17–17 ^{OT}	0–2–1	AOL Arena	15,837
4	Saturday, April 8	7:00 p.m.	at Rhein Fire	L 21–31	0–3–1	LTU arena	18,224
5	Saturday, April 15	6:00 p.m.	Frankfurt Galaxy	L 13–17	0–4–1	AOL Arena	12,281
6	Sunday, April 23	4:00 p.m.	at Cologne Centurions	L 17–20	0–5–1	RheinEnergieStadion	9,238
7	Saturday, April 29	6:00 p.m.	Amsterdam Admirals	L 17–18	0–6–1	AOL Arena	15,224
8	Sunday, May 7	4:00 p.m.	at Berlin Thunder	W 38–14	1–6–1	Olympic Stadium	16,762
9	Sunday, May 14	4:00 p.m.	Rhein Fire	W 13–10	2–6–1	AOL Arena	16,823
10	Saturday, May 20	7:00 p.m.	at Amsterdam Admirals	W 34–21	3–6–1	Amsterdam ArenA	15,937

== Standings ==
NFL Europe League
Team	W	L	T	PCT	PF	PA	Home	Road	STK
Amsterdam Admirals	7	3	0	.700	259	234	2–3–0	5–0–0	L1
Frankfurt Galaxy	7	3	0	.700	172	160	4–1–0	3–2–0	W1
Rhein Fire	6	4	0	.600	207	165	4–1–0	2–3–0	W1
Cologne Centurions	4	6	0	.400	151	170	2–3–0	2–3–0	L1
Hamburg Sea Devils	3	6	1	.350	194	193	1–3–1	2–3–0	W3
Berlin Thunder	2	7	1	.250	180	241	1–4–0	1–3–1	L5

== Game summaries ==
=== Week 1: vs Cologne Centurions ===
Week One: Cologne Centurions at Hamburg Sea Devils – Game summary

Quarter	1	2	3	4	Total
Cologne	7	0	7	0	14
Hamburg	10	0	0	0	10

at AOL Arena, Hamburg, Germany

- Date: Saturday, March 18
- Game time: 6:08 p.m. CET
- Game weather: 32 °F (0 °C), cloudy
- Game attendance: 15,243
- Referee: Gene Steratore

=== Week 2: at Frankfurt Galaxy ===
Week Two: Hamburg Sea Devils at Frankfurt Galaxy – Game summary

Quarter	1	2	3	4	Total
Hamburg	0	7	7	0	14
Frankfurt	7	14	3	7	31

at Commerzbank-Arena, Frankfurt, Germany

- Date: Saturday, March 25
- Game time: 7:09 p.m. CET
- Game weather: 40 °F (4.4 °C), partly cloudy
- Game attendance: 26,713
- Referee: Carl Cheffers

=== Week 3: vs Berlin Thunder ===
Week Three: Berlin Thunder at Hamburg Sea Devils – Game summary

Quarter	1	2	3	4	OT	Total
Berlin	0	0	7	10	0	17
Hamburg	0	17	0	0	0	17

at AOL Arena, Hamburg, Germany

- Date: Saturday, April 1
- Game time: 6:06 p.m. CEST
- Game weather: 52 °F (11.1 °C), cloudy
- Game attendance: 15,837
- Referee: Jerome Boger

=== Week 4: at Rhein Fire ===
Week Four: Hamburg Sea Devils at Rhein Fire – Game summary

Quarter	1	2	3	4	Total
Hamburg	7	7	0	7	21
Rhein	0	7	7	17	31

at LTU arena, Düsseldorf, Germany

- Date: Saturday, April 8
- Game time: 7:05 p.m. CEST
- Game weather: 51 °F (10.6 °C), roof closed
- Game attendance: 18,224
- Referee: Alberto Riveron

=== Week 5: vs Frankfurt Galaxy ===
Week Five: Frankfurt Galaxy at Hamburg Sea Devils – Game summary

Quarter	1	2	3	4	Total
Frankfurt	0	7	3	7	17
Hamburg	0	10	0	3	13

at AOL Arena, Hamburg, Germany

- Date: Saturday, April 15
- Game time: 6:05 p.m. CEST
- Game weather: 57 °F (14 °C), cloudy
- Game attendance: 12,281
- Referee: Craig Wrolstad

=== Week 6: at Cologne Centurions ===
Week Six: Hamburg Sea Devils at Cologne Centurions– Game summary

Quarter	1	2	3	4	Total
Hamburg	0	3	7	7	17
Cologne	3	0	3	14	20

at RheinEnergieStadion, Cologne, Germany

- Date: Sunday, April 23
- Game time: 4:00 p.m.
- Game attendance: 9,238

=== Week 7: vs Amsterdam Admirals ===
Week Seven: Amsterdam Admirals at Hamburg Sea Devils – Game summary

Quarter	1	2	3	4	Total
Amsterdam	3	0	6	9	18
Hamburg	0	17	0	0	17

at AOL Arena, Hamburg, Germany

- Date: Saturday, April 29
- Game time: 6:05 p.m. CEST
- Game weather: 46 °F (8 °C), overcast
- Game attendance: 15,224
- Referee: Terry Brown

=== Week 8: at Berlin Thunder ===
Week Eight: Hamburg Sea Devils at Berlin Thunder – Game summary

Quarter	1	2	3	4	Total
Hamburg	7	14	3	14	38
Berlin	0	7	0	7	14

at Olympic Stadium, Berlin, Germany

- Date: Sunday, May 7
- Game time: 4:00 p.m.
- Game attendance: 16,762

=== Week 9: vs Rhein Fire ===
Week Nine: Rhein Fire at Hamburg Sea Devils – Game summary

Quarter	1	2	3	4	Total
Rhein	0	7	3	0	10
Hamburg	0	3	3	7	13

at AOL Arena, Hamburg, Germany

- Date: Sunday, May 14
- Game time: 4:05 p.m. CEST
- Game weather: 59 °F (15.0 °C), partly cloudy
- Game attendance: 16,823
- Referee: Alberto Riveron

=== Week 10: at Amsterdam Admirals ===
Week Ten: Hamburg Sea Devils at Amsterdam Admirals – Game summary

Quarter	1	2	3	4	Total
Hamburg	3	14	7	10	34
Amsterdam	0	0	7	14	21

at Amsterdam ArenA, Amsterdam, Netherlands

- Date: Saturday, May 20
- Game time: 7:05 p.m. CEST
- Game weather: roof closed
- Game attendance: 15,937
- Referee: Jerome Boger

== Honors ==
After the completion of the regular season, the All-NFL Europe League team was selected by the NFLEL coaching staffs, members of a media panel and fans voting online at NFLEurope.com. Overall, Hamburg had three players selected. The selections were:

- Scott McCready, national player
- Rayshun Reed, cornerback
- Scott Scharff, defensive end
