= Rayshun Reed =

American football player and coach (born 1981)

No. 31
- Position: Defensive back

Personal information
- Born: April 10, 1981 (age 45); Columbus, Georgia, U.S.
- Listed height: 5 ft 10 in (1.78 m)
- Listed weight: 185 lb (84 kg)

Career information
- High school: Russell County (Seale, Alabama)
- College: Troy
- NFL draft: 2004: undrafted

Career history
- San Francisco 49ers (2004); Hamburg Sea Devils (2006); New York Jets (2006)*; Orlando Predators (2006–2008); Tampa Bay Storm (2008)
- * Offseason or practice squad member only
- Stats at Pro Football Reference
- Stats at ArenaFan.com

Brandon Rayshun Reed (born April 10, 1981) is an American former professional football player who was a defensive back for one season with the San Francisco 49ers of the National Football League (NFL). He played college football for the Troy Trojans. He was also a member of the Hamburg Sea Devils, New York Jets, Orlando Predators and Tampa Bay Storm.

== Early life ==
Reed attended Russell County High School in Seale, Alabama.

== Professional career ==
Reed was signed by the San Francisco 49ers on April 30, 2004, after going undrafted in the 2004 NFL draft. He was released by the 49ers on September 3, 2005.

Reed was selected by the Hamburg Sea Devils of NFL Europe in January 2006. He was named to the All-NFL Europe League team.

Reed signed with the New York Jets on May 30, 2006. He was released by the Jets on August 27, 2006.

Reed was signed by the Orlando Predators of the Arena Football League (AFL) on December 18, 2006. He was released by the Predators on February 23, 2008.

Reed signed with the Tampa Bay Storm of the AFL on March 4, 2008.

== Coaching career ==
Reed has spent time as the defensive backs coach for the Columbus Lions.

== Personal life ==
Reed owns Big Play Sports Fitness in Phenix City, Alabama. It is geared towards helping children athletically.
