= Terrence Robinson =

American football player (born 1980)

No. 92, 52
- Position: Linebacker

Personal information
- Born: March 12, 1980 (age 46); Tyler, Texas, U.S.
- Listed height: 6 ft 0 in (1.83 m)
- Listed weight: 240 lb (109 kg)

Career information
- High school: John Tyler
- College: Oklahoma State (1998–2002)
- NFL draft: 2003: undrafted

Career history
- Pittsburgh Steelers (2003)*; Atlanta Falcons (2003); → Rhein Fire (2004); Seattle Seahawks (2005)*; → Rhein Fire (2005); Rhein Fire (2006)
- * Offseason or practice squad member only

Awards and highlights
- All-NFL Europe (2006)
- Stats at Pro Football Reference

Terrence Lamont Robinson (born March 12, 1980) is an American former professional football linebacker who played for the Atlanta Falcons of the National Football League (NFL). He played college football for the Oklahoma State Cowboys.

== Early life ==
Terrence Lamont Robinson was born on March 12, 1980, in Tyler, Texas. He attended John Tyler High School.

== College career ==
Robinson enrolled at Oklahoma State University to play college football for the Cowboys. He redshirted the 1998 season and was a four-year letterman from 1999 to 2002. He was a team captain his senior year in 2002 and earned honorable mention All-Big 12 honors.

== Professional career ==
After going undrafted in the 2003 NFL draft, Robinson signed with the Pittsburgh Steelers on May 2, 2003. He was waived on August 30, 2003.

Robinson was signed to the Atlanta Falcons' practice squad on October 15, 2003. He was promoted to the active roster on December 22, 2003, and played in the regular season finale. In 2004, the Falcons allocated Robinson to NFL Europe to play for the Rhein Fire. He appeared in nine games, starting six, for the Fire during the 2004 NFL Europe season, posting 24 defensive tackles, five special teams tackles, two interceptions for 21 yards, and four pass breakups. He was waived by the Falcons on September 5, 2004.

On January 12, 2005, Robinson signed a reserve/future contact with the Seattle Seahawks. He was allocated to NFL Europe to play for the Fire. He started all ten games for Rhein in 2005, recording 29 defensive tackles, three special teams tackles, and two pass breakups. The Fire finished the year with a 3–7 record. Robinson was waived by the Seahawks on September 3, 2005.

In January 2006, Robinson was drafted to play for the Rhein Fire in 2006. He started all ten games for the second consecutive season, totaling 60 defensive tackles, one special teams tackles, two fumble recoveries, and three pass breakups as the Fire went 6–4. He was named to the All-NFL Europe team for the 2006 season.
