= Anthony Floyd =

American football player (born 1981)

No. 33, 39
- Position: Safety

Personal information
- Born: February 1, 1981 (age 45); Youngstown, Ohio, U.S.
- Listed height: 5 ft 10 in (1.78 m)
- Listed weight: 202 lb (92 kg)

Career information
- High school: Chaney (OH)
- College: Louisville
- NFL draft: 2003: undrafted

Career history
- Indianapolis Colts (2003–2004); Berlin Thunder (2006); Houston Texans (2006)*; Columbus Destroyers (2007); New Orleans VooDoo (2007–2008)
- * Offseason or practice squad member only

Awards and highlights
- All-NFL Europe (2006); First-team All-American (2000)

Career NFL statistics
- Tackles: 56
- Passes defended: 2
- Fumble recoveries: 1
- Stats at Pro Football Reference

Career AFL statistics
- Tackles: 40
- Passes defended: 2
- Forced fumbles: 1
- Fumble recoveries: 1
- Interceptions: 5
- Stats at ArenaFan.com

Anthony Franklin Floyd (born February 1, 1981) is an American former professional football player who was a safety for the Indianapolis Colts of the National Football League (NFL). He played college football for the Louisville Cardinals. He spent the 2006 NFL Europe season with the Berlin Thunder, where he earned All-NFL Europe honors after making four interceptions, tied for second in the league. He spent the 2006 NFL preseason with the Houston Texans before being released at the conclusion of training camp.

== Early life ==
Floyd attended Chaney High School in Youngstown, Ohio, and earned three varsity letters together in football and basketball, and four in track.
