= Sacha Lancaster =

American gridiron football player (born 1979)

Profile
- Position: Defensive end

Personal information
- Born: March 29, 1979 (age 47); San Antonio, Texas, U.S.
- Listed height: 6 ft 3 in (1.91 m)
- Listed weight: 270 lb (122 kg)

Career information
- College: Arkansas
- NFL draft: 2002: undrafted

Career history
- Los Angeles Avengers (2002); Arkansas Twisters (2003); New Orleans VooDoo (2004); Detroit Fury (2004); Hamburg Sea Devils (2005); Rhein Fire (2006); Hamilton Tiger-Cats (2008); Jacksonville Sharks (2011)

Sacha Lancaster (born March 29, 1979) is an American former football player. He played as a fullback/linebacker for the Los Angeles Avengers, the New Orleans VooDoo, the Detroit Fury, the Hamilton Tiger-Cats and the Jacksonville Sharks. He spent two seasons playing in NFL Europe with the Hamburg Sea Devils and Rhein Fire. Lancaster was arrested in October 2015 for selling narcotics to an undercover police officer at Maumelle High School in Maumelle, Arkansas.

== College career ==
Lancaster played four years (1998–2002) at Arkansas. He played his first three seasons as a defensive lineman and his senior season as a fullback. He recorded 63 defensive tackles, 12 tackles for losses and 5.5 quarterback sacks in 34 games as a defensive lineman. His most memorable sack came in the 1999 Citrus Bowl when he sacked current New England Patriots quarterback Tom Brady. During his 4-year career, he played in the 1999 Citrus Bowl, the 2000 Cotton Bowl, the 2000 Las Vegas Bowl and the 2002 Cotton Bowl.
