= Jeff Otis =

American football player (born 1983)

No. 15
- Position: Quarterback

Personal information
- Born: January 30, 1983 (age 43); St. Louis, Missouri, U.S.
- Listed height: 6 ft 1 in (1.85 m)
- Listed weight: 215 lb (98 kg)

Career information
- College: Columbia
- NFL draft: 2005: undrafted

Career history
- Frankfurt Galaxy (2006); Arizona Cardinals (2006)*; Oakland Raiders (2007)*; Kansas City Chiefs (2007)*; Oakland Raiders (2008)*; St. Louis Rams (2009)*; Oakland Raiders (2009)*
- * Offseason or practice squad member only

Jeff Otis (born January 30, 1983) is an American former football quarterback. He was signed by the Arizona Cardinals as a street free agent in 2006. He played college football at Columbia.

Otis was also a member of the Kansas City Chiefs, St. Louis Rams and Oakland Raiders. He is the son of former National Football League (NFL) running back Jim Otis.

He graduated from the Darden School of Business at the University of Virginia in 2011 with an MBA.

== Early life ==
Jeffrey David Otis competed in football and track at Christian Brothers College High School. He was a member of the Missouri East All-Star Team. Jeff also was an All-West County selection and a St. Louis Post Dispatch Super 30 nominee.

== College career ==
He played for the Columbia Lions in his NCAA career. Jeff ranks second in the All-Time Columbia University passing list with yardage of 4,666 and pass completions 429. Jeff was in the starting role for the Lions in 2003. Jeff responded by finishing third in the league in per game passing average at 255.2 yards per contest. Jeff was named an outstanding player for the Lions. Jeff ranked seventh in Division I-AA in completions per game, and finished third on Columbia University's all-time single-season list with 217 completions. Jeff rated fourth on the school's single-season touchdown list with 17 and third in total offense with 2,675 yards.

=== Arizona Cardinals ===
Otis was undrafted in the 2005 NFL draft. After the NFL draft, he was later signed as a free agent with Arizona on January 5, 2006. He was allocated to NFL Europe by the Cardinals where he helped the Frankfurt Galaxy to a championship in World Bowl XIV. Otis was later released.

=== First stint with Raiders ===
Otis signed as a free agent with the Oakland Raiders on March 26, 2007. He was released by the Raiders before the regular season in 2007.

=== Kansas City Chiefs ===
Toward the end of the 2007 season, Otis was added to the Kansas City Chiefs' practice squad.

=== Second stint with Raiders ===
On March 25, 2008, Otis was re-signed by the Oakland Raiders. He was released prior to the regular season.

The Raiders re-signed Otis to their practice squad on November 12, 2008.

=== St. Louis Rams ===
Otis signed with the St. Louis Rams on March 16, 2009. The Rams waived him on April 30.

=== Third stint with Raiders ===
Otis was re-signed to the practice squad of the Oakland Raiders on December 23, 2009.

== Personal life ==
His father Jim Otis was a running back for the St. Louis Cardinals. He and his brother also went to CBC High School in St. Louis. They won the Missouri State Title in 2015.
