= Scott Scharff =

American football player (born 1982)

No. 95
- Position: Defensive end

Personal information
- Born: February 7, 1982 (age 44); Wisconsin Rapids, Wisconsin, U.S.
- Listed height: 6 ft 5 in (1.96 m)
- Listed weight: 265 lb (120 kg)

Career information
- College: Stanford
- NFL draft: 2005: undrafted

Career history
- San Francisco 49ers (2005–2006)*; Hamburg Sea Devils (2006); New Orleans Saints (2006–2007)*
- * Offseason or practice squad member only

Awards and highlights
- First-team All-NFL Europe (2006)

Scott Scharff (born February 7, 1982) is an American former football defensive lineman. He previously spent two and a half seasons with the San Francisco 49ers and the New Orleans Saints. He played college football at Stanford.

== Professional career ==
=== San Francisco 49ers ===
Signed as an undrafted free agent following the 2005 NFL draft choosing the San Francisco 49ers over offers from five other teams. After training camp was placed on the practice squad for the 2005–2006 season. Allocated to NFL Europe during the off-season. Upon his return, Scharff spent the 2006–2007 training camp with the 49ers. Scharff was waived at the conclusion of training camp and promptly signed by the New Orleans Saints.

=== Hamburg Sea Devils ===
Allocated to NFL Europe by the San Francisco 49ers on January 11, 2006. Started all 10 games at defensive end for the Hamburg Sea Devils. Led all players in NFL Europe with 6.0 sacks. Honored by being named First Team All-NFL Europe for his performance during the 2006 season.

=== New Orleans Saints ===
Was obtained off waivers from the San Francisco 49ers. He was placed on the practice squad for the majority of the 2006-2007 season. On November 29, 2006 was elevated to the 53-man active roster for week 12 vs the 49ers. Suffered a season ending knee injury (ACL, MCL, Meniscus) during practice later that same day. Underwent reconstructive surgery and was placed on the injured reserve for the remainder of the season. After spending the off-season rehabilitating the injury, Scharff was re-signed to the team for the 2007-2008 season. He was released by the Saints at the end of training camp.

== College career ==
=== Stanford University ===
Scharff played college football at Stanford where he was a three-time letter winner and team co-captain. While at Stanford, Scharff majored in Sociology with a concentration in Business, Organizations, and Economics with a minor in Public Policy.

=== 2004 ===
Started all 11 games at Defensive end. He tallied 23 tackles, 11 of which were solo, 1.0 sacks, 2.0 tackles for loss, 4 passes deflected, and 1 blocked kick. Lettered for the third season.

=== 2003 ===
Was a backup defensive tackle who played in 10 of 11 games and lettered for the second-consecutive season. He provided the Cardinal with a quality defensive tackle coming off the bench. Scharff had 8.0 tackles, 2.0 fumble recoveries, and 1.0 blocked kick. Missed one game (Oregon, 10/25) after sustaining a torn ACL, MCL, and Meniscus in his left knee. Despite the injury, Scharff finished out the season, playing the final five games in a brace, and underwent arthroscopic ACL surgery at the conclusion of the 2003 season.

=== 2002 ===
Earned his first varsity letter as a backup defensive tackle. He played in all 11 games and started one game against Arizona State. Scharff accounted for 9.0 tackles, including 5.0 solos, 1.0 tackles for loss and 1.0 sacks.

=== 2001 ===
Appeared in three games as a reserve defensive lineman - vs. Arizona State, vs. UCLA and at Arizona. He recorded one tackle in Stanford's 51-28 victory over Arizona State on Sept. 22.

=== 2000 ===
Redshirted the campaign as a true freshman.

== High school ==
He played football at Lincoln High School in Wisconsin Rapids, Wisconsin. He played as a defensive end. His senior year, he was named a Bigger Faster Stronger Magazine All-American, USA Today honorable mention All-American, All-State, and Wisconsin Valley Conference Defensive Player of the Year, first-team all-conference and all-region, and was one of the top defensive lineman in the nation. Finished senior year with 15 sacks and 29 tackles for loss. He also participated in powerlifting. Placed first in the 242 lb. weight class in the Wisconsin State Powerlifting Championship.
