= David Kimball =

American football player (born 1982)

Profile
- Position: Placekicker

Personal information
- Born: January 13, 1982 (age 44); Fredericksburg, Virginia, U.S.

Career information
- College: Penn State
- NFL draft: 2004: 7th round, 229th overall pick

Career history
- Indianapolis Colts (2004)*; New York Giants (2005)*; Oakland Raiders (2006)*; → Frankfurt Galaxy (2006)
- * Offseason or practice squad member only

David Wayne Kimball (born January 13, 1982) is an American former football placekicker. He attended State College Area High School and was a Parade All-American selection there in 1999. He played college football at Penn State, and was selected by the Indianapolis Colts in the seventh round of the 2004 NFL draft. Kimball was allocated to NFL Europe by the Oakland Raiders in 2006.

== College career ==
Kimball played collegiately at Penn State University from 2000 to 2003, serving mostly as a kickoff specialist with 132 career touchbacks. While at Penn State, his major was Recreation & Park Management.

== Professional career ==
Originally a seventh round selection (#229 overall) of the Indianapolis Colts in the 2004 NFL draft, Kimball stood little chance making the squad over Mike Vanderjagt, the NFL's all-time most accurate field goal kicker. He was released by the Colts after training camp on September 1, 2004. He signed with the New York Giants on January 7, 2005, but was waived during camp on August 18, 2005, in favor of veteran kicker Jay Feely.

Kimball was signed as a free agent by the Oakland Raiders on January 19, 2006, and then allocated to the Frankfurt Galaxy on January 24. Kimball appeared in 1 preseason game with the Raiders, kicking a 23-yard field goal on his only attempt against the 49ers, before being cut on August 28, 2006.

In Europe, the Galaxy went 7–3 in the regular season on their way to the World Bowl. On May 27, 2006, Frankfurt defeated the Amsterdam Admirals 22–7 in World Bowl XIV. In the World Bowl, Kimball scored 8 points, going 2–2 on extra points and 2–3 on field goals. He made FG attempts from 29 & 37 yards, with his only miss coming on a 48-yard attempt that sailed wide left midway through the 2nd quarter. He had 5 kickoffs in the World Bowl, averaging 59.6 yards per kick. Kimball appeared in all 11 games (including the World Bowl) for the Galaxy, leading the team in scoring with 72 points. He was 18 for 18 on extra points, and 18 for 29 on field goal attempts. His longest kick of the season was 49 yards against the Rhein Fire. He kicked 2 game winning field goals, both with less than 10 seconds left in the 4th quarter. Kimball had 49 kickoffs for 3028 yards (61.8 average), with 2 touchbacks. He recorded 2 tackles during the season.

=== 2006 season stats ===
Frankfurt Galaxy

Week	XP	20–29	30–39	40–49	50+	Points	KO	KO Yds
1	0/0	0/0	1/2	1/1	0/0	6	3	194
2	4/4	0/0	0/0	1/1	0/0	7	6	379
3	2/2	1/1	1/1	0/0	0/1	8	5	256
4	3/3	0/0	0/0	0/0	0/0	3	4	269
5	2/2	0/0	0/0	1/2	0/0	5	4	230
6	0/0	2/2	2/2	0/2	0/0	12	6	338
7	2/2	0/0	0/0	1/3	0/0	5	4	241
8	1/1	2/2	1/1	0/1	0/0	10	5	316
9	0/0	1/1	0/1	1/2	0/0	6	4	274
10	2/2	0/0	0/0	0/0	0/0	2	3	193
WB	2/2	1/1	1/1	0/1	0/0	8	5	298
Totals	18/18	7/7	6/8	5/13	0/1	72	49	3028
