= J. R. Niklos =

American football player (born 1979)

No. 40
- Position: Fullback

Personal information
- Born: June 19, 1979 (age 47); Worthington, Ohio, U.S.
- Listed height: 6 ft 4 in (1.93 m)
- Listed weight: 239 lb (108 kg)

Career information
- College: Western Illinois (x3 All American TE)
- NFL draft: 2002: undrafted

Career history
- Seattle Seahawks (2002)*; St. Louis Rams (2002); Seattle Seahawks (2002)*; St. Louis Rams (2002-2003); Oakland Raiders (2004–2005)*; Frankfurt Galaxy (2005-2006); Kansas City Chiefs (2006)*; Frankfurt Galaxy (2007); Cleveland Browns (2007)*
- * Offseason or practice squad member only

John Russell Niklos II (born, June 19, 1979) is an American former professional football fullback.He was a 3 time all American TightEnd.

== Early life ==
Niklos played high school football and track for Thomas Worthington High School where he was an All American in both Track and Football. He won the indoor track state championship in the 200 and 4x400 and his 4x400 team also won the Ohio state championship and placed second in the nation at the National Championship. He was all-state, all-region and all-district for football as well as honorable mention All-American.

== College career ==
Safety was his first position as a collegiate athlete, at Ohio State University. Niklos played one season for the Buckeyes and soon thereafter transferred to Western Illinois University where he was a three-time All-American tight end. Niklos finished his career at Western Illinois statistically as the top tight end in W.I.U. history.

== Professional career ==
After college, Niklos went undrafted and signed a free agent contract with the Seattle Seahawks. He was placed on Seattle Seahawks practice squad. The St. Louis Rams moved him to the active roster due to the retirement of former Heisman Trophy winner Eric Crouch He then was a member of the St. Louis Rams between 2002 and 2005 where Mike Martz labeled him "The Fastest Fullback In The NFL". [9] After that, Niklos played a season in Germany with NFL Europa and won a World Bowl with the Frankfurt Galaxy. Due to the cancellation of NFL Europa, he returned to the United States, and signed with the Cleveland Browns. Niklos also spent time with the Oakland Raiders and was on Injured Reserve with the Kansas City Chiefs.

== Post career ==
Niklos is currently owner of Acceleration Sports Performance and Midwest BOOM Football. He also is the Special Teams Coordinator at College Of Dupage where he helped lead the team to win the 2021, 2022, 2023, 2024, and 2025 Junior College National Championship.
