= 2006 NFL Europe season =

European-American football season

The 2006 NFL Europe season was the 14th season of the league and second to last.

NFL Europe League
Team	W	L	T	PCT	PF	PA	Home	Road	STK
Amsterdam Admirals	7	3	0	.700	259	234	2–3–0	5–0–0	L1
Frankfurt Galaxy	7	3	0	.700	172	160	4–1–0	3–2–0	W1
Rhein Fire	6	4	0	.600	207	165	4–1–0	2–3–0	W1
Cologne Centurions	4	6	0	.400	151	170	2–3–0	2–3–0	L1
Hamburg Sea Devils	3	6	1	.350	194	193	1–3–1	2–3–0	W3
Berlin Thunder	2	7	1	.250	180	241	1–4–0	1–3–1	L5

== World Bowl XIV ==
World Bowl XIV was held on Saturday, May 27, 2006, at LTU Arena in Düsseldorf, Germany. The Frankfurt Galaxy defeated the Amsterdam Admirals, 22–7.
