= Berlin Thunder (NFL Europe) =

Professional American football team in Germany

Logo

General information
- Founded: 1999; 27 years ago
- Folded: 2007; 19 years ago
- Stadium: Olympic Stadium
- Headquartered: Berlin, Germany
- Colors: Black, Green, Tan, Orange, White

League / conference affiliations
- NFL Europe

Championships
- World Bowls: 3: World Bowl IX (2001); World Bowl X (2002); World Bowl XII (2004)

The Berlin Thunder were a professional American football team in NFL Europe.

== History ==
The Thunder came into existence as an expansion team, after the London/England Monarchs franchise shut down operations, prior to the 1999 season. Home games from 1999 to 2002 were played at Friedrich-Ludwig-Jahn-Sportpark and one game in 2006. Olympiastadion was the home stadium from 2003 to 2007. They were the second team in league history to use the Thunder name, following the Orlando Thunder from 1991 to 1992.

The Thunder won the World Bowl three times: 2001, 2002 and 2004 (a year that they went 9–1). They also made it to the World Bowl in 2005 but were defeated by the Amsterdam Admirals 21–27.

Two Berlin quarterbacks, Rohan Davey (2004) and Dave Ragone (2005), were named NFL Europe Offensive Most Valuable Players. Linebacker Rich Scanlon (2005) was named NFL Europe Defensive MVP. In 2006, the Thunder had three players earn All-NFL Europe honors: guard Chad Beasley and safety Anthony Floyd earned all-league honors at their respective positions and German defensive end Christian Mohr was honored as the national player on the defensive all-league team.

On 1 April 2006, the Thunder recorded their first tie in franchise history. Trailing the Hamburg Sea Devils 17–0 at halftime, the Thunder erased their deficit to tie it up, going into overtime in which neither team could come up with a point. This was only the second tie in the history of NFL Europe. The previous tie came in the 1992 season between the Birmingham Fire and the London Monarchs, also 17-17.

An unrelated team of the same name is to play in the inaugural 2021 season of the new European League of Football.

== Season-by-season ==
Season	League	Regular season					Postseason			
Season	League	Won	Lost	Ties	Win %	Finish	Won	Lost	Win %	Result
1999	NFLE	3	7	0	.300	6th (League)	–	–	—	Out of playoffs.
2000	NFLE	4	6	0	.400	6th (League)	–	–	—	Out of playoffs.
2001	NFLE	6	4	0	.600	2nd (League)	1	0	1.000	World Bowl IX champions
2002	NFLE	6	4	0	.600	2nd (League)	1	0	1.000	World Bowl X champions
2003	NFLE	3	7	0	.300	6th (League)	–	–	—	Out of playoffs.
2004	NFLE	9	1	0	.900	1st (League)	1	0	1.000	World Bowl XII champions
2005	NFLE	7	3	0	.700	1st (League)	0	1	.000	Lost to Amsterdam Admirals in World Bowl XIII
2006	NFLE	2	7	1	.250	6th (League)	–	–	—	Out of playoffs.
2007	NFLE	2	8	0	.200	6th (League)	–	–	—	Out of playoffs.
Total		42	47	1	.472		3	1	.750	

== Head coaches ==
#	Name	Term	Regular season					Postseason				Achievements
#	Name	Term	GC	Won	Lost	Ties	Win %	GC	Won	Lost	Win %	Achievements
1	Wes Chandler	1999	10	3	7	0	.300	–	–	–	—	—
2	Peter Vaas	2000–2003	40	19	21	0	.475	2	2	0	1.000	2 World Bowl championships (IX, X); NFL Europe Coach of the Year (2002)
3	Rick Lantz	2004–2006	30	18	11	1	.617	2	1	1	.500	World Bowl XII championship NFL Europe Coach of the Year (2004)
4	John Allen	2007	10	2	8	0	.200	–	–	–	—	—

== Notable players ==
- (United States) Lance Moore – WR (2006)
- (Germany) Richard Adjei – LB (2007)
- (United States) David Akers – K (1999)
- (United States) Chris Barclay – RB (2007)
- (United States) Lang Campbell – QB (2005)
- (United States) Travis Lulay – QB (2007)
- (Jamaica) Rohan Davey – QB (2004)
- (United States) Anthony Floyd – S (2005)
- (United States) Chas Gessner – S (2004)
- (United States) Ben Hamilton – C (2002)
- (United States) Tim Hasselbeck – QB (2002)
- (United States) Madre Hill – RB (2001)
- (Canada) Israel Idonije – DE (2004)
- (United States) Brian Moorman – P (2000–2001)
- (United States) Dave Ragone – QB (2005)
- (United States) Brian Simnjanovski – P/K (2005)
- (United States) Brian Waters – C/OG (2000)
- (United States) Phil Stambaugh – QB (2003)
- (United States) Ahmad Hawkins – CB (2002)
- (United States) Tony Pape – G (2005)
