= World Bowl XIV =

2006 NFL Europe championship game

| Frankfurt Galaxy (2nd) | Amsterdam Admirals (1st) |
|---|---|
| 22 | 7 |
| | 1 | 2 | 3 | 4 | Total |
|---|---|---|---|---|---|
| FRA | 2 | 0 | 10 | 10 | 22 |
| AMS | 0 | 7 | 0 | 0 | 7 |
- Date: Saturday, May 27, 2006
- Stadium: LTU arena Düsseldorf, Germany
- MVP: Butchie Wallace, Running back
- Referee: Jerome Boger
- Attendance: 36,286

Ceremonies
- Halftime show: Manfred Mann's Earth Band

TV in the United States
- Network: NFL Network
- Announcers: Curt Menefee and Brian Baldinger

World Bowl XIV, officially known as Yello Strom World Bowl XIV, was the 2006 championship game of the NFL Europe League. It was held at the LTU arena in Düsseldorf, Germany on Saturday, May 27, 2006. The game was between the defending World Bowl champion Amsterdam Admirals, who finished the season in first place with a record of 7–3, and the second-placed Frankfurt Galaxy, who finished with a record of 7–3 as well. 36,286 people were in attendance, as the Galaxy stripped the Admirals of their title in a 22–7 victory. Frankfurt running back Butchie Wallace was named MVP of World Bowl XIV, by running 18 times for 143 yards (with his longest rush being 63 yards) and 1 touchdown.

This was the first World Bowl that wasn't played in June, as the league wanted to avoid a clash with the 2006 FIFA World Cup. Also, it marked the third-straight year that a team would fall in a World Bowl after winning the title in the previous year.

== Background ==
The Admirals swept the regular season series against the Galaxy (38–20 in Amsterdam and 17–12 in Frankfurt).

== Game summary ==
In a low-scoring first half, the Galaxy struck first with 1:55 left in the first quarter. Frankfurt defensive tackle Jerome Nichols sacked Admirals quarterback Jared Allen in the end zone for a safety. However, in the second quarter, the Admirals would respond with a 7-play, 55-yard drive that ended with Amsterdam running back Larry Croom running 12 yards for a touchdown. It gave the Admirals a 7–2 halftime lead. However, these seven points would be all that the Admirals would score. In the third quarter, Frankfurt quarterback Jeff Otis led his team on an 8-play, 66-yard drive that ended with Butchie Wallance running 4 yards for a touchdown. On their next possession, Frankfurt kicker David Kimball kicking a 29-yard field goal, which would give the Galaxy a 12–7 lead going into the final quarter. In the fourth quarter, the Amsterdam Admirals couldn't get any points onto the board, as Frankfurt's defense closed any hope of a comeback. Meanwhile, the Galaxy offense, led by Otis, widened their lead with a 14-play, 62-yard drive that was capped off with a 37-yard field goal by Kimball. On their next possession, Frankfurt delivered the final nail for the Admirals coffin as Galaxy running back J.R. Niklos capped off a 3-play, 74-yard drive with a 12-yard dash to the end zone for a touchdown. With their victory, the Galaxy captured their fourth World Bowl title in franchise history.

=== Scoring summary ===
- Frankfurt - Safety Nichols sacks Allen 1:55 1st
- Amsterdam - TD Croom 12 yd run 7:32 2nd
- Frankfurt - TD Wallance 4 yd run 4:22 3rd
- Frankfurt - FG Kimball 29 yd 0:29 3rd
- Frankfurt - FG Kimball 37 yd 4:37 4th
- Frankfurt - TD Niklos 12 yd run 1:06 4th
