= 2007 Hamburg Sea Devils season =

NFL Europa League team season

- General manager: Kathrin Platz
- Head coach: Vince Martino
- Home stadium: AOL Arena

Results
- Record: 7–3
- Division place: 1st
- Playoffs: World Bowl XV champions

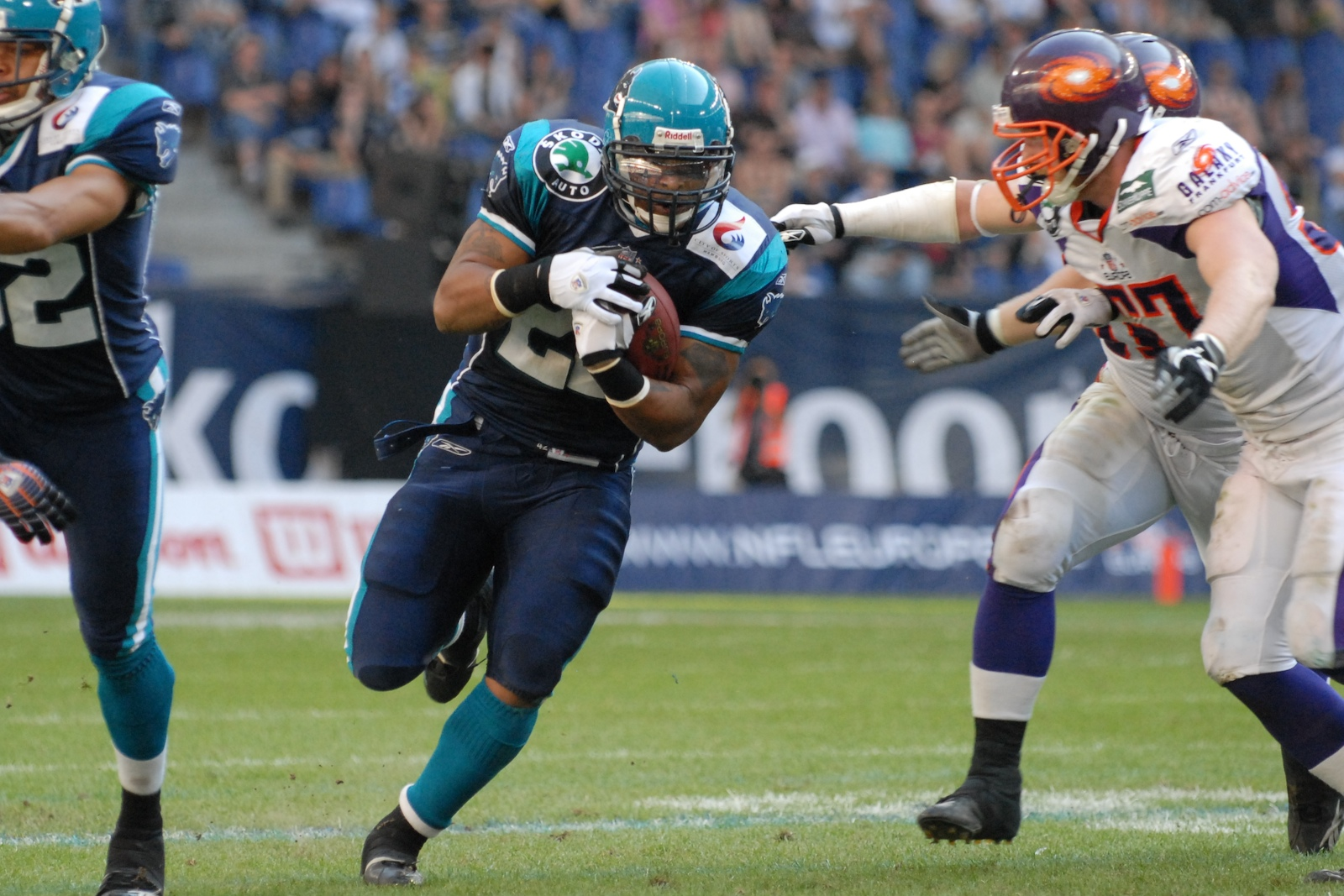
Frankfurt at Hamburg, June 9, 2007

The 2007 Hamburg Sea Devils season was the third and final season for the franchise in the NFL Europa League (NFLEL). The team was led by head coach Vince Martino in his first year, and played its home games at AOL Arena in Hamburg, Germany. They finished the regular season in first place with a record of seven wins and three losses. Hamburg won the first championship in team history by defeating the Frankfurt Galaxy 37–28. The National Football League (NFL) announced the closure of its European branch on June 29.

== Offseason ==
=== Free agent draft ===
2007 Hamburg Sea Devils NFLEL free agent draft selections
Draft order		Player name	Position	College
Round	Choice	Player name	Position	College
1	2	Quentin Griffin	RB	Oklahoma
2	8	Michael Harden	CB	Missouri
3	17	Cliff Washburn	T	Citadel
4	20	Gary Gibson	DT	Rutgers
5	29	Rashaun Woods	WR	Oklahoma State
6	32	Marcus Lawrence	LB	South Carolina
7	41	Bryan Watje	TE	San Jose State
8	44	Vernell Brown	CB	Florida
9	53	Mike Pinkard	TE	Arizona State
10	56	Javon Nanton	DE	Miami
11	65	Byron Hardmon	LB	Florida
12	68	Shawn Mayer	S	Penn State
13	77	Nick Hagemann	T	South Dakota
14	80	Michael Ford	CB	Duquesne
15	89	Tony Hollings	RB	Georgia Tech
16	92	Thomas Smith	DT	Pittsburgh
17	101	Justin Jenkins	WR	Mississippi State
18	104	Adam O’Connor	G	William & Mary
19	113	Robert Durham	CB	Tuskegee
20	116	Jason Peterson	DE	North Dakota
21	125	Ryan Hamby	TE	Ohio State
22	128	Charles Hall	CB	Southeastern Louisiana
23	132	Ezra Landry	WR	Southern
24	134	Kenny Kern	LB	Delaware State

== Personnel ==
=== Staff ===
2007 Hamburg Sea Devils (NFL Europe) staff
Front office: General manager – Kathrin Platz; Head coaches: Head coach – Vince Martino; Offensive coaches: Quarterbacks – Ron Hudson; Running backs – Shuan Fatah; National coach/wide receivers – Patrick Esume; Offensive line – Mike Malano	Defensive coaches: Defensive coordinator/defensive backs – Dan Daniel; Defensive line – Mike Sinclair; Linebackers – Charles Jones; Assistant defensive backs – Dexter Davis; Special teams coaches: National coach/special teams coordinator – Patrick Esume; Strength and conditioning: Strength and conditioning – Brent Rogers

=== Roster ===
2007 Hamburg Sea Devils final roster
Quarterbacks: 5 Casey Bramlet; 16 Mike McGann; 12 Rod Rutherford; Running backs: 20 Quentin Griffin; 22 Tony Hollings; Wide receivers: 82 Josh Davis; 11 Justin Jenkins; 19 Marcus Maxwell; 14 Rich Parson; Tight ends: 85 Teyo Johnson; 86 Mike Pinkard	Offensive linemen: 65 Mike Brisiel C/G; 70 Ryan Gibbons G; 69 Pete McMahon G; 57 Adam O'Connor T; 74 Rod Olds C/G; 73 Jeremy Parquet T; 75 Steve Sciullo G; 79 Cliff Washburn T; Defensive linemen: 93 Nathaniel Adibi DE; 95 Gary Gibson DT; 97 Justin Kurpeikis DE; 71 Tim Sandidge DT (IR); 98 Thomas Smith DT; 91 Jimmy Verdon DE (IR); 90 Seante Williams DE	Linebackers: 51 Trent Bray OLB; 42 Byron Hardmon OLB; 58 James Hargrave OLB; 52 Kenny Kern MLB; 40 Barry Robertson MLB; Defensive backs: 25 Brent Grimes CB; 36 Michael Harden CB; 23 Shawn Mayer SS; 24 Lamont Reid CB; 28 John Walker FS; 29 Justin Wyatt CB/FS; Special teams: 17 Adam Anderson P; 3 Shane Andrus K; 89 Jacob Rice LS	National players: 21 (England) Jermaine Allen RB; 77 (Sweden) Carl-Johan Blomvall C; 18 (England) Dwain Chambers WR; 54 (England) Aden Durde MLB; 31 (Japan) Ryota Hori SS; 48 (Mexico) Jonathan Hurtado OLB; 99 (Germany) Ben Ishola DE; 87 (England) Scott McCready WR; 13 (Mexico) Juan Wong WR; Rookies in italics

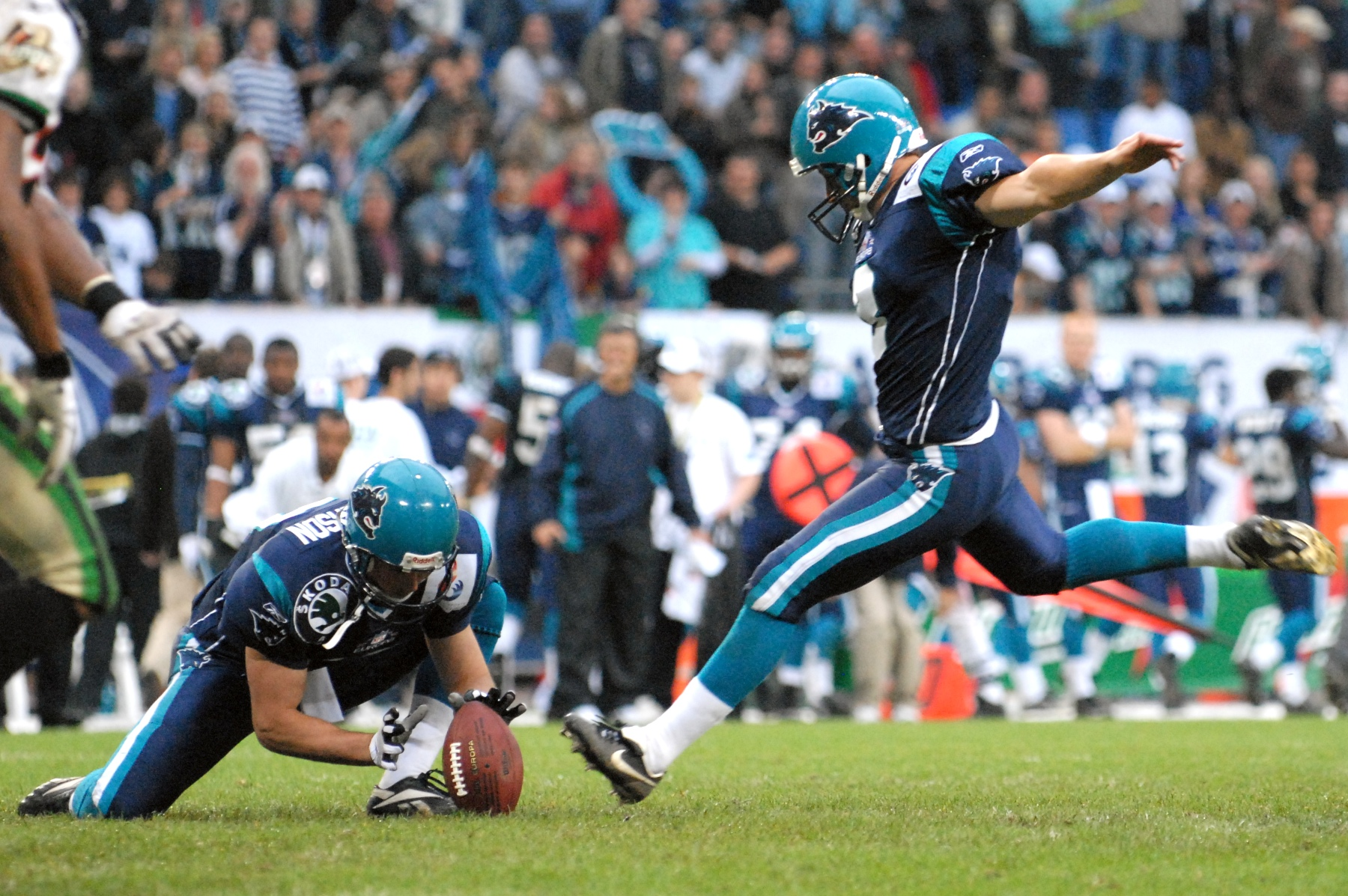
The Sea Devils try a kick in the 2007 season

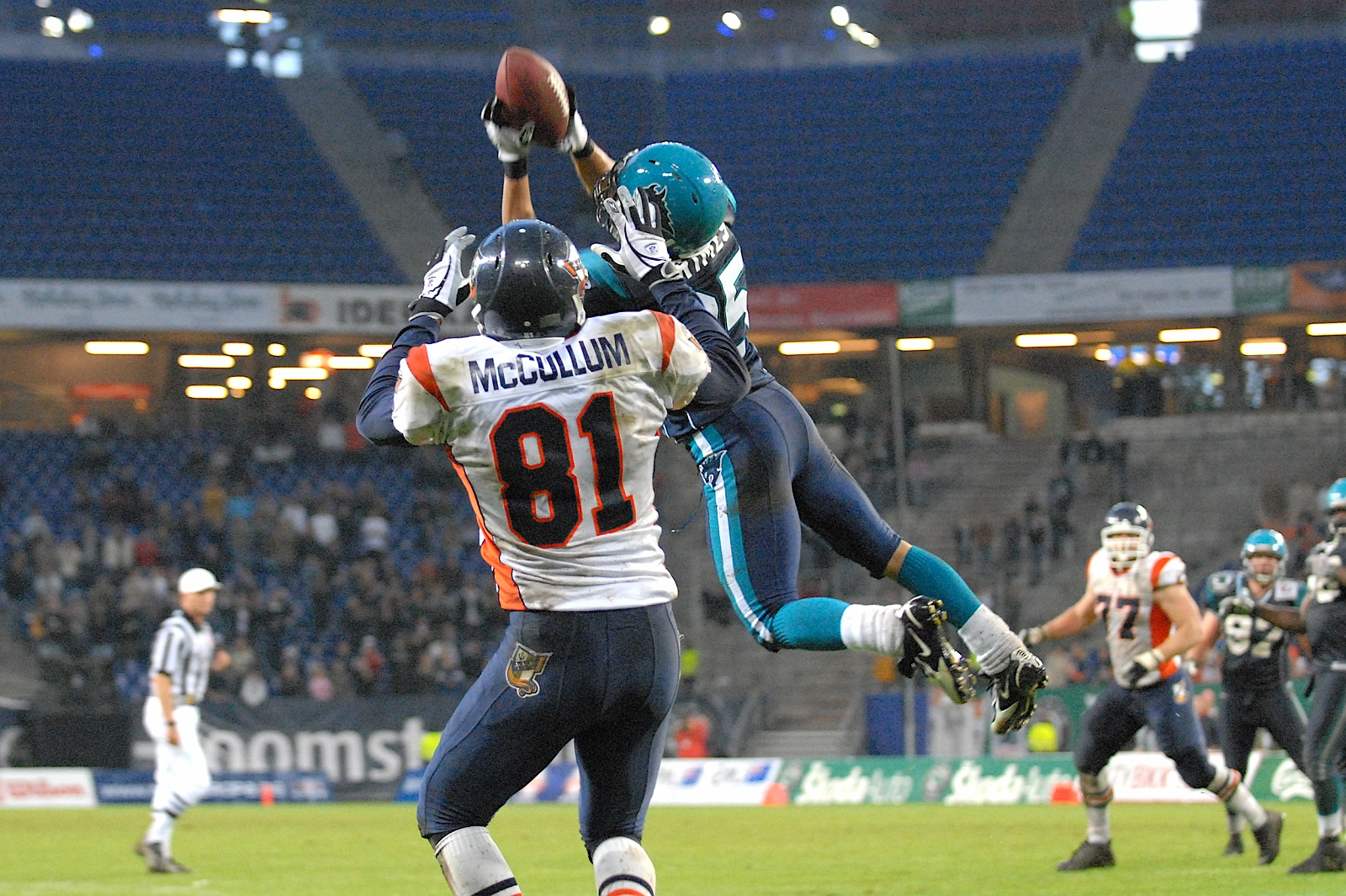
Brent Grimes makes an interception catch against Amsterdam, 2007

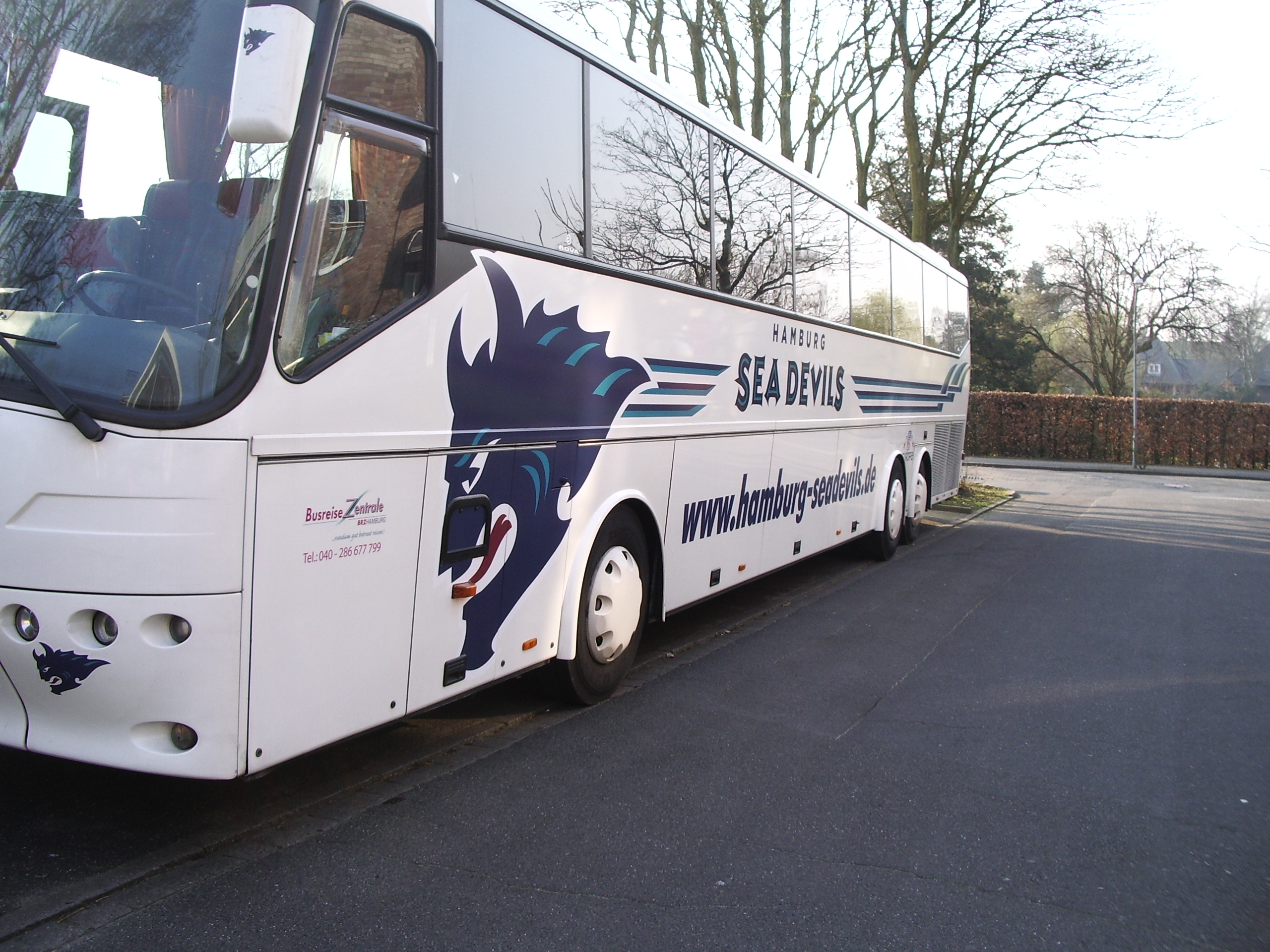
Sea Devil logo on the side of a coach

== Schedule ==
Week	Date	Kickoff (Note: All times are Central European Summer Time (CEST).)	Opponent	Results		Game site	Attendance
Week	Date	Kickoff	Opponent	Final score	Team record	Game site	Attendance
1	Saturday, April 14	6:00 p.m.	Cologne Centurions	L 18–24	0–1	AOL Arena	20,887
2	Sunday, April 22	4:00 p.m.	at Berlin Thunder	W 16–7	1–1	Olympic Stadium	30,657
3	Saturday, April 28	7:00 p.m.	at Frankfurt Galaxy	L 17–20	1–2	Commerzbank-Arena	29,091
4	Sunday, May 6	4:00 p.m.	Rhein Fire	W 34–9	2–2	AOL Arena	19,347
5	Saturday, May 12	6:00 p.m.	Amsterdam Admirals	W 24–17	3–2	AOL Arena	15,271
6	Friday, May 18	8:00 p.m.	at Amsterdam Admirals	L 31–41	3–3	Amsterdam ArenA	9,384
7	Saturday, May 26	6:00 p.m.	Berlin Thunder	W 17–7	4–3	AOL Arena	18,337
8	Saturday, June 2	6:00 p.m.	at Cologne Centurions	W 21–7	5–3	RheinEnergieStadion	10,221
9	Saturday, June 9	6:00 p.m.	Frankfurt Galaxy	W 36–31	6–3	AOL Arena	30,528
10	Saturday, June 16	7:00 p.m.	at Rhein Fire	W 17–13	7–3	LTU arena	22,980
World Bowl XV
11	Saturday, June 23	7:00 p.m.	Frankfurt Galaxy	W 37–28	8–3	Commerzbank-Arena	48,125

== Standings ==
NFL Europa League
Team	W	L	T	PCT	PF	PA	Home	Road	STK
Hamburg Sea Devils	7	3	0	.700	231	176	4–1	3–2	W4
Frankfurt Galaxy	7	3	0	.700	254	179	5–0	2–3	W1
Cologne Centurions	6	4	0	.600	205	172	2–3	4–1	L1
Rhein Fire	4	6	0	.400	166	212	2–3	2–3	L1
Amsterdam Admirals	4	6	0	.400	194	250	3–2	1–4	W1
Berlin Thunder	2	8	0	.200	146	207	0–5	2–3	L6

== Game summaries ==
=== Week 1: vs Cologne Centurions ===
Week One: Cologne Centurions at Hamburg Sea Devils – Game summary

Quarter	1	2	3	4	Total
Cologne	0	14	3	7	24
Hamburg	6	0	6	6	18

at AOL Arena, Hamburg, Germany

- Date: Saturday, April 14
- Game time: 6:00 p.m. CEST
- Game attendance: 20,887

=== Week 2: at Berlin Thunder ===
Week Two: Hamburg Sea Devils at Berlin Thunder – Game summary

Quarter	1	2	3	4	Total
Hamburg	0	10	3	3	16
Berlin	0	0	0	7	7

at Olympic Stadium, Berlin, Germany

- Date: Sunday, April 22
- Game time: 4:02 p.m. CEST
- Game weather: 64 °F (17.8 °C), sunny
- Game attendance: 30,657
- Referee: Don Carey
- TV announcers (NFL Network): Scott Graham and Doug Graber

=== Week 3: at Frankfurt Galaxy ===
Week Three: Hamburg Sea Devils at Frankfurt Galaxy – Game summary

Quarter	1	2	3	4	Total
Hamburg	0	0	6	11	17
Frankfurt	7	3	0	10	20

at Commerzbank-Arena, Frankfurt, Germany

- Date: Saturday, April 28
- Game time: 7:00 p.m. CEST
- Game attendance: 29,091

=== Week 4: vs Rhein Fire ===
Week Four: Rhein Fire at Hamburg Sea Devils – Game summary

Quarter	1	2	3	4	Total
Rhein	0	3	6	0	9
Hamburg	7	10	14	3	34

at AOL Arena, Hamburg, Germany

- Date: Sunday, May 6
- Game time: 4:00 p.m. CEST
- Game attendance: 19,347

=== Week 5: vs Amsterdam Admirals ===
Week Five: Amsterdam Admirals at Hamburg Sea Devils – Game summary

Quarter	1	2	3	4	Total
Amsterdam	0	0	14	3	17
Hamburg	7	10	0	7	24

at AOL Arena, Hamburg, Germany

- Date: Saturday, May 12
- Game time: 6:05 p.m. CEST
- Game attendance: 15,271
- Referee: Craig Wrolstad

=== Week 6: at Amsterdam Admirals ===
Week Six: Hamburg Sea Devils at Amsterdam Admirals – Game summary

Quarter	1	2	3	4	Total
Hamburg	0	10	7	14	31
Amsterdam	7	20	7	7	41

at Amsterdam ArenA, Amsterdam, Netherlands

- Date: Friday, May 18
- Game time: 8:04 p.m. CEST
- Game attendance: 9,384
- Referee: Alberto Riveron

=== Week 7: vs Berlin Thunder ===
Week Seven: Berlin Thunder at Hamburg Sea Devils – Game summary

Quarter	1	2	3	4	Total
Berlin	3	4	0	0	7
Hamburg	0	3	0	14	17

at AOL Arena, Hamburg, Germany

- Date: Saturday, May 26
- Game time: 6:00 p.m.
- Game attendance: 18,337

=== Week 8: at Cologne Centurions ===
Week Eight: Hamburg Sea Devils at Cologne Centurions – Game summary

Quarter	1	2	3	4	Total
Hamburg	7	0	7	7	21
Cologne	0	0	7	0	7

at RheinEnergieStadion, Cologne, Germany

- Date: Saturday, June 2
- Game time: 6:00 p.m. CEST
- Game attendance: 10,221

=== Week 9: vs Frankfurt Galaxy ===
Week Nine: Frankfurt Galaxy at Hamburg Sea Devils – Game summary

Quarter	1	2	3	4	Total
Frankfurt	14	7	3	7	31
Hamburg	10	14	3	9	36

at AOL Arena, Hamburg, Germany

- Date: Saturday, June 9
- Game time: 6:00 p.m. CEST
- Game attendance: 30,528

=== Week 10: at Rhein Fire ===
Week Ten: Hamburg Sea Devils at Rhein Fire – Game summary

Quarter	1	2	3	4	Total
Hamburg	3	7	7	0	17
Rhein	0	10	0	3	13

at LTU arena, Düsseldorf, Germany

- Date: Saturday, June 16
- Game time: 7:00 p.m. CEST
- Game attendance: 22,980

=== World Bowl XV ===
World Bowl XV: Hamburg Sea Devils vs Frankfurt Galaxy – Game Summary

Quarter	1	2	3	4	Total
Hamburg	13	10	7	7	37
Frankfurt	0	14	14	0	28

at Commerzbank-Arena, Frankfurt, Germany

- Date: Saturday, June 23
- Game time: 7:10 p.m. CEST
- Game weather: 70 °F (21.1 °C)
- Game attendance: 48,125
- Referee: John Parry
- TV announcers (NFL Network): Bob Papa and Brian Baldinger

== Honors ==
Throughout the course of the 10-week regular season, eight players earned player of the week accolades: Adam Anderson (special teams, Week 7), Casey Bramlet (offense, Week 4), Gary Gibson (defense, Week 4), Byron Hardmon (defense, Week 5), Ben Ishola (national, Weeks 2 and 8), Justin Jenkins (offense, Week 3), Scott McCready (national, Weeks 1, 4 and 10), and Rich Parson (special teams, Week 3).

After the completion of the regular season, the All-NFL Europa League team was selected by the NFLEL coaching staffs, members of a media panel and fans voting online at NFLEurope.com. Overall, Hamburg had eight players selected. The selections were:

- Gary Gibson, defensive tackle
- Ben Ishola, national defensive player
- Justin Kurpeikis, defensive end
- Shawn Mayer, safety
- Marcus Maxwell, wide receiver
- Scott McCready, national offensive player
- Pete McMahon, guard
- Jeremy Parquet, tackle

Head coach Vince Martino was named NFLEL Coach of the Year after leading his team to a first title game appearance in team history. Additionally, quarterback Casey Bramlet earned World Bowl MVP honors.
