= Tony Hollings =

American football player (born 1981)

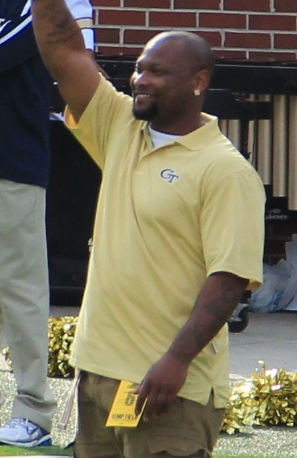
- Hollings in 2012

No. 25, 32, 22
- Position: Running back

Personal information
- Born: December 1, 1981 (age 44); Macon, Georgia, U.S.
- Listed height: 5 ft 11 in (1.80 m)
- Listed weight: 220 lb (100 kg)

Career information
- High school: Jeffersonville
- College: Georgia Tech
- Supplemental draft: 2003: 2nd round

Career history
- Houston Texans (2003–2005); Chicago Bears (2006)*; Indianapolis Colts (2006)*; Hamburg Sea Devils (2007); New York Jets (2007)*; Dresden Monarchs (2008); Berlin Adler (2009)
- * Offseason or practice squad member only
- Stats at Pro Football Reference

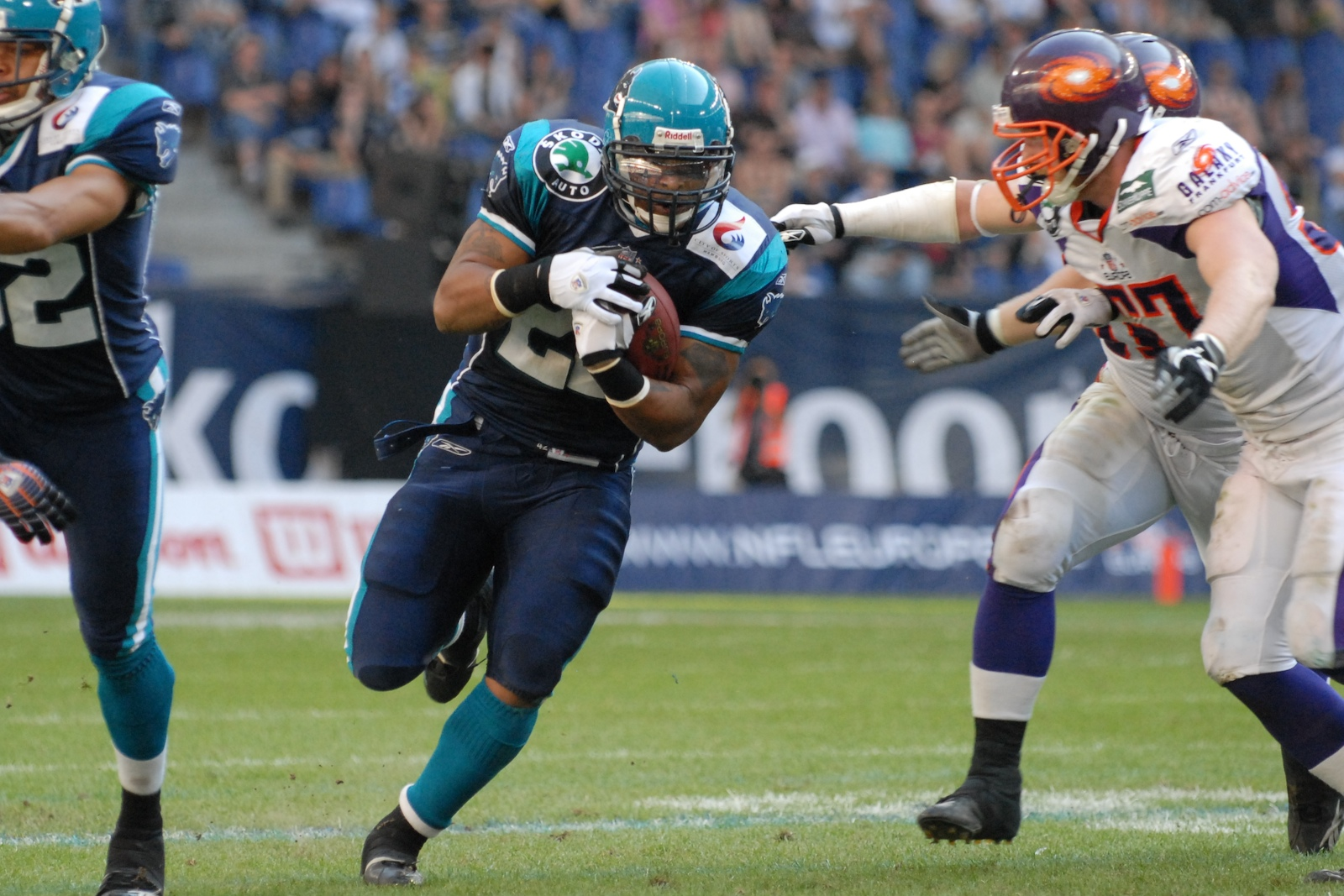
Hollings playing for the Hamburg Sea Devils in 2007.

Tony Terrell Hollings (born December 1, 1981) is an American former professional football player who was a running back in the National Football League (NFL). He was selected by the Houston Texans in the second round of the 2003 NFL draft Supplemental Draft out of Georgia Tech. He also played in the German Football League (GFL) for two seasons.

== College career ==
Hollings was given the nickname "Superman" during his college career because of the way he "flew" over defensive opponents.

== Professional career ==
=== Houston Texans ===
Hollings was selected by the Houston Texans in the second round of the 2003 NFL supplemental draft.

From 2003 to 2007, because of a knee surgery when he was at Georgia Tech, Hollings went nearly a year between games, but he regained durability throughout his 2003 rookie season with the Houston Texans and showed promise. On September 21 against the Kansas City Chiefs, in his first non-special teams action, he rushed for 41 yards on 7 carries. He spent 2003–2005 with the Texans. He made his only career start in a game late in the 2003 season. Ex-coach Dom Capers said Hollings gave the team “some speed and burst.”

Hollings was waived by the Texans on March 1, 2006.

=== Chicago Bears ===
Hollings signed with the Chicago Bears on May 5, 2006. He was waived on July 28, 2006.

=== Indianapolis Colts ===
Hollings was signed by the Indianapolis Colts on August 4, 2006. He was waived by the Colts on September 2, 2006.

=== Hamburg Sea Devils ===
Hollings played for the Hamburg Sea Devils of NFL Europa during the 2007 NFL Europa season. He played in 10 games, starting one, for the Sea Devils, rushing 189 times for 338 yards and four touchdowns while also catching eight passes for 94 yards.

=== New York Jets ===
Hollings signed with the New York Jets on August 1, 2007. He was waived on August 27, 2007.

=== German Football League ===
In 2008, he played for the Dresden Monarchs in the German Football League as starting halfback. One year later he was traded to the Berlin Adler but suffered a season-ending injury.
