= Justin Jenkins =

American football player (born 1980)

No. 17, 8
- Position: Wide receiver

Personal information
- Born: December 10, 1980 (age 45); Pearl, Mississippi, U.S.
- Listed height: 6 ft 0 in (1.83 m)
- Listed weight: 207 lb (94 kg)

Career information
- High school: Pearl
- College: Mississippi State
- NFL draft: 2004: undrafted

Career history
- Philadelphia Eagles (2004–2005); Hamburg Sea Devils (2007); Buffalo Bills (2007–2009); Florida Marine Raiders (2014)

Awards and highlights
- Second-team All-SEC (2003)

Career NFL statistics
- Return yards: 45
- Stats at Pro Football Reference

Justin Jenkins (born December 10, 1980) is an American former professional football player who was a wide receiver in the National Football League (NFL). He played college football for the Mississippi State Bulldogs and was signed by the Philadelphia Eagles as an undrafted free agent in 2004.

Jenkins also played for the Hamburg Sea Devils and Buffalo Bills.

== Professional career ==
=== Philadelphia Eagles ===
Jenkins was signed by the Philadelphia Eagles as an undrafted free agent following the 2004 NFL draft on April 27, 2004. He was waived on September 5 and subsequently signed to the practice squad on September 6. He was re-signed to a future contract on February 10, 2005. He suffered a torn anterior cruciate ligament during a preseason game on August 20 and placed on injured reserve on August 28. He was released on September 2, 2006.

=== Hamburg Sea Devils ===
Jenkins played for the Hamburg Sea Devils in NFL Europa for one season and led his team to the World Bowl Championship. He finished the season with 39 receptions for 583 yards (14.95 yards per reception avg.) and two touchdowns. In the World Bowl game, he made 7 receptions for 74 yards and a touchdown.

=== Buffalo Bills ===
Jenkins was signed by the Buffalo Bills on June 29, 2006. He was released on September 1, 2007, and was subsequently re-signed to the practice squad on September 6. He was promoted to the active roster on October 19. He was re-signed on February 17, 2008, to a multi-year contract. He was released on September 14 and re-signed on September 17. He was waived once again on February 16, 2010.
