= Cliff Washburn =

American gridiron football player (born 1980)

No. 67
- Position: Offensive tackle

Personal information
- Born: January 25, 1980 (age 46); Shelby, North Carolina, U.S.
- Listed height: 6 ft 6 in (1.98 m)
- Listed weight: 300 lb (136 kg)

Career information
- High school: Shelby (NC)
- College: The Citadel
- NFL draft: 2003: undrafted

Career history
- New York Giants (2003)*; Chicago Bears (2003–2005)*; Dallas Cowboys (2006)*; Minnesota Vikings (2006)*; Toronto Argonauts (2006); Hamburg Sea Devils (2007); Denver Broncos (2007)*; Green Bay Packers (2007–2008)*; Houston Texans (2008)*; Toronto Argonauts (2008); Houston Texans (2009)*; Toronto Argonauts (2009); Saskatchewan Roughriders (2009); Las Vegas Locomotives (2010); Edmonton Eskimos (2011)
- * Offseason or practice squad member only

Clifton Washburn (born January 25, 1980) is a former professional athlete who played in the American National Football League (NFL), NFL Europe and United Football League (UFL) as well as with the Canadian Football League (CFL). He was signed by the New York Giants as an undrafted free agent in 2003; he has also been a member of the Chicago Bears, Dallas Cowboys, Minnesota Vikings, Denver Broncos, Green Bay Packers, Houston Texans, Toronto Argonauts, Saskatchewan Roughriders, Edmonton Eskimos, Amsterdam Admirals, Hamburg Sea Devils, Frankfurt Galaxy, and Las Vegas Locomotives. He played both football and basketball at The Citadel.

== Early life ==
Washburn attended Shelby High School in Shelby, North Carolina graduating in 1998; he was a three-time All-Conference Basketball selection, as a senior he averaged 16 points and 10 rebounds per game.

== College career ==
Washburn was a 3-year starter for The Citadel Basketball team from 1998 to 2002 scoring 1,024 points and grabbing 632 rebounds, he is one of only five players to lead the team in rebounding three consecutive years. After his eligibility ended he joined the Bulldogs football team for the 2002 season as a Defensive End where he tied a school record with 12 quarterback sacks, he also recorded 56 tackles and returned a fumble for a touchdown. He played in the Hula Bowl and East-West Shrine Game. He has the unique distinction of being an All Southern Conference selection in both sports and was the first in league history to have been a Player of the Week in both football and basketball. He was inducted into The Citadel Athletic Hall of Fame in 2017.

== Professional career ==
=== National Football League ===
Washburn was signed by the New York Giants of the National Football League as an undrafted free agent in 2003. He has also been a member of the Chicago Bears, Dallas Cowboys, Minnesota Vikings, Denver Broncos, Green Bay Packers. On August 11, 2008, Washburn signed with the Houston Texans, only to be a final training camp casualty on August 31. However, on January 5, 2009, Washburn was re-signed by the Texans under a reserve/future contract. He was released at the end of training camp on September 5, 2009.

=== World League of American Football ===
While playing in the NFL Washburn also spent several summers playing in the WLAF (later NFL Europe) which was considered a developmental league for less talented players. He was a member of the Amsterdam Admirals in 2004, the Frankfurt Galaxy in 2005 and the Hamburg Sea Devils in 2007 who defeated Frankfurt in World Bowl XV.

=== Canadian Football League ===
On July 4, 2006, Washburn signed with the Toronto Argonauts of the Canadian Football League and played in six regular season games for them during the 2006 CFL season, all of them as a starting tackle. Washburn also played in the East Division final for the Argos in a losing cause.

Washburn was re-acquired by the Argonauts on September 29, 2008.

After being released by Houston, Washburn re-joined Toronto on September 28, 2009. On October 14, 2009, Washburn was traded to the Saskatchewan Roughriders in exchange for a 5th round draft pick in 2010 and a conditional draft pick in 2011. He spent his final season in professional football starting 5 games at Offensive Tackle for the Edmonton Eskimos in 2011.

=== Las Vegas Locomotives ===
Washburn signed with the Las Vegas Locomotives of the United Football League in June 2010. He was released on November 1.

== Coaching career ==
While playing professional football Washburn served as a volunteer high school basketball coach in Chicago and Forest City, North Carolina; in July, 2015 he was named Head Basketball Coach at Cane Bay High School in Summerville, South Carolina after spending a year as a volunteer assistant.
