= Quentin Griffin =

American gridiron football player (born 1981)

No. 22
- Position: Running back

Personal information
- Born: January 12, 1981 (age 45); Houston, Texas, U.S.
- Listed height: 5 ft 7 in (1.70 m)
- Listed weight: 195 lb (88 kg)

Career information
- High school: Nimitz (Houston)
- College: Oklahoma
- NFL draft: 2003: 4th round, 108th overall pick

Career history
- Denver Broncos (2003–2005); Kansas City Chiefs (2006)*; Hamburg Sea Devils (2007); Saskatchewan Roughriders (2008)*; Kiel Baltic Hurricanes (2013)
- * Offseason or practice squad member only

Awards and highlights
- BCS national champion (2000); Second-team All-American (2002); First-team All-Big 12 (2002)

Career NFL statistics
- Rushing attempts: 179
- Rushing yards: 656
- Rushing touchdowns: 2
- Receptions: 18
- Receiving yards: 129
- Receiving touchdowns: 1
- Stats at Pro Football Reference

Quentin LaVell Griffin (born January 12, 1981) is an American former professional football player who was a running back for the Denver Broncos of the National Football League (NFL). He played college football for the Oklahoma Sooners.

== Early life ==
Griffin started his football career as a youth playing in the Humble Area Football League. Griffin starred at Nimitz High School in Houston.

== College career ==
As a sophomore at Oklahoma, Griffin ran for 783 yards and 16 touchdowns and added 45 receptions for 406 yards. He was an All-Big 12 first team selection and was named to the Big 12 All-academic team, his first of three consecutive nominations to both squads. Junior totals were 182 for 884 with 9 touchdowns on the ground with 55 for 448 and 2 touchdowns as a receiver, and as a senior totaled 287 carries for 1,884 yards with 15 scores, placing him second in the league for rushing. Also caught 35 passes for 264 yards with three additional scores. The three-year starter helped his school win a national championship in 2000 and he finished fourth in school history in career rushing yards (3,756), third in touchdowns (44) and chose to preserve Billy Sims’ record and finish second in all-purpose yards (4,973). He had an Oklahoma-record six rushing touchdowns against Texas in 2000.

== Professional career ==
Pre-draft measurables
Height	Weight	Arm length	Hand span	40-yard dash	10-yard split	20-yard split	20-yard shuttle	Vertical jump	Broad jump	Bench press
5 ft 7 in (1.70 m)	195 lb (88 kg)	30 in (0.76 m)	9 1/4 in (0.23 m)	4.50 s	1.54 s	2.55 s	4.08 s	38 in (0.97 m)	10 ft 3 in (3.12 m)	21 reps
All values from NFL Combine

Griffin was selected by the Denver Broncos of the National Football League with the 11th pick of the fourth round (108th overall) in the 2003 NFL draft. He went on to appear in 16 games, including five starts in his initial two seasons in the league. He even set a Broncos franchise record in 2004 for most rushing yards in a season opener with a career-high 156 yards on 23 carries against the Kansas City Chiefs while also scoring the first three touchdowns of his pro career. His rise to the top came to a sudden halt in 2004 when he tore the ACL in his right knee in Week 7, ending his season early.

Although he was highly productive in two seasons with the Broncos, totaling 179 rushes for 656 yards (3.7 avg.) and two touchdowns, in addition to catching 18 passes for 129 yards and one score, the injury caused him to drop to the bottom of the depth chart behind Mike Anderson, Tatum Bell and Ron Dayne. In September 2005, Denver released Griffin and then brought him back a few weeks later, only to release him again the next month, but this time for good.

In March 2006, Griffin agreed to terms with the Kansas City Chiefs on a one-year deal, but in September 2006, he was cut from the team.

On February 23, 2007, Griffin was chosen by the Hamburg Sea Devils as the second overall pick in the NFL Europa Free Agent Draft. Griffin was the Sea Devils' top rusher with a 4.6 yard average and was third-best among starting running backs in the NFLE. The multi-dimensional Griffin also led NFL Europa in kickoff return average.

On February 29, 2008, he was signed to a one-year plus an option year contract with the Saskatchewan Roughriders. He was released by the Roughriders on June 20, 2008, following the team's final preseason game. According to media reports, Roughriders' head coach Ken Miller was "so upset with Griffin following (the game) that he cut the former NFLer at the airport." Griffin had reportedly pulled himself out of the game early in the second quarter, telling the coaches "he didn't have any interest in playing a preseason game where he might get hurt."

In July 2013, Griffin signed with the Kiel Baltic Hurricanes in Germany (GFL1). As of 2016, he is no longer on the team because the running back transitioned from playing football to coaching football.

== Coaching ==
Griffin took his first coaching job with Missouri Southern State University. In July 2018, he left MSSU for the position of running backs coach for the University of Northern Iowa (UNI) Panthers. After one season at UNI, Griffin took a position as Assistant Football Coach (Running Backs) at Blinn College in Brenham, Texas.
