= Adam O'Connor =

American football player (born 1983)

Profile
- Position: Offensive tackle

Personal information
- Born: January 27, 1983 (age 43)
- Listed height: 6 ft 8 in (2.03 m)
- Listed weight: 270 lb (122 kg)

Career information
- High school: Ragsdale (Jamestown, North Carolina)
- College: William & Mary (2001–2005)

Career history
- Carolina Panthers (2006); Hamburg Sea Devils (2007); Minnesota Vikings (2007)

Awards and highlights
- Third-team FCS All-American (2004); Second-team All-Atlantic 10 (2004)

Adam O'Connor (born January 27, 1983) is an American former professional football offensive tackle. He played college football for the William & Mary Tribe, where he was an All-American defensive end. He played in the National Football League (NFL) for the Carolina Panthers in 2006 and Minnesota Vikings in 2007. Additionally, he won a World Bowl with the Hamburg Sea Devils of NFL Europe in 2007.

== Early life ==
O'Connor was born January 27, 1983 and played high school football at Ragsdale High School in Jamestown, North Carolina, playing on both the offensive line and defensive line. He also competed on the school's basketball and baseball teams.

== College career ==
O'Connor played college football for the William & Mary Tribe from 2001 to 2005, redshirting his freshman season. A defensive end for the Tribe, O'Connor recorded eight quarterback sacks in 2004, which led the Atlantic 10 Conference. He was named second-team All-Atlantic 10 and third-team FCS All-American that season.

== Professional career ==
O'Connor was signed by the Carolina Panthers of the National Football League (NFL) on May 5, 2006, and was released on September 2; he signed to the team's practice squad the next day and was released on October 17. He was selected by the Hamburg Sea Devils of NFL Europe in the league's 2007 free agent draft; he played left tackle for the team, winning the 2007 World Bowl. He returned to the NFL, signing with the Minnesota Vikings on July 2, 2007, and was released following an injury on August 28.

== Post-football career ==
After retiring from professional football, O'Connor began a career in medicine. He attended the Brody School of Medicine at East Carolina University, and in 2019, he began his residency in emergency medicine at the University of Virginia.
