= Mike Brisiel =

American football player (born 1983)

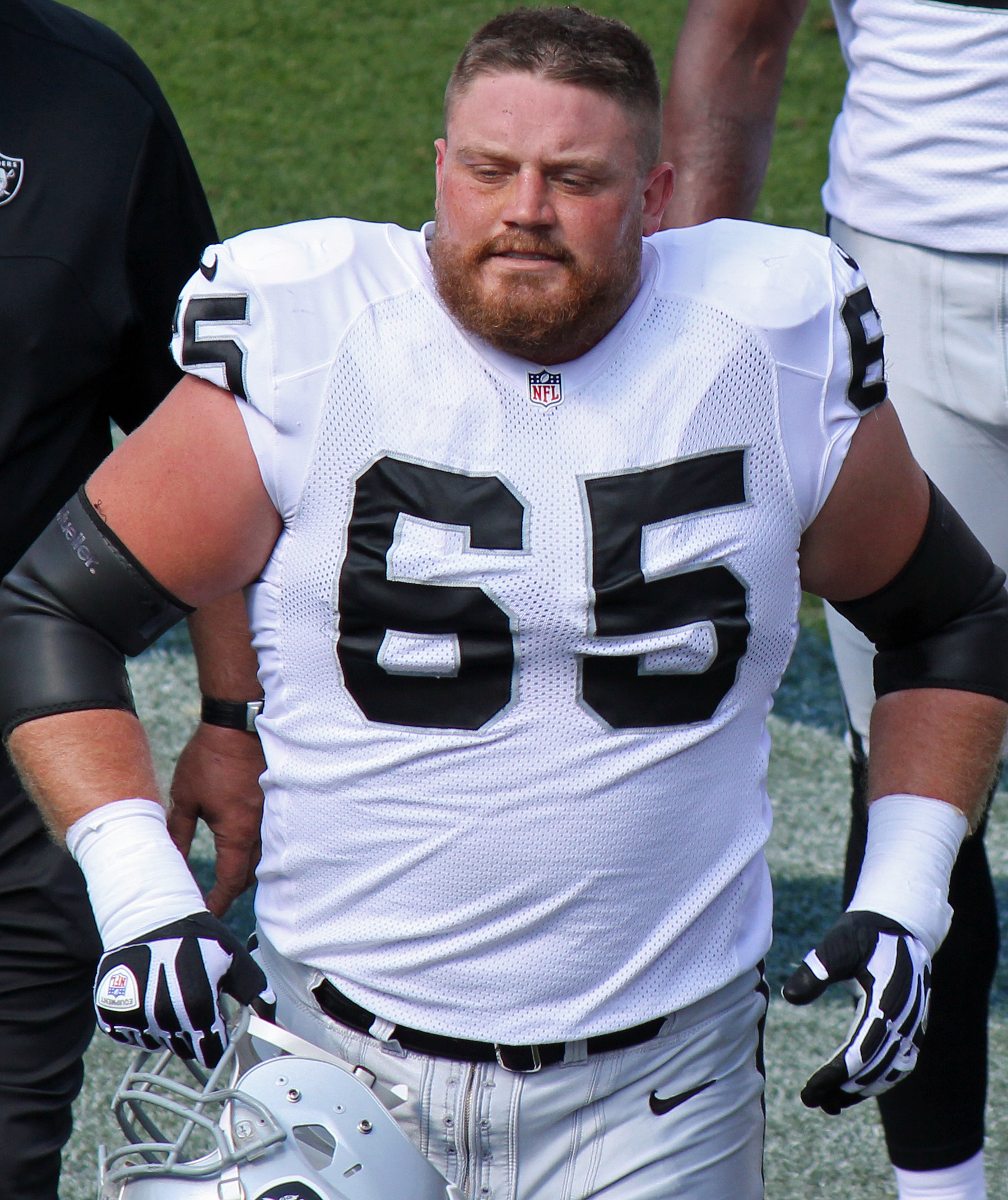
- Brisiel in 2012.

No. 65
- Position: Guard

Personal information
- Born: March 14, 1983 (age 43); San Marcos, Texas, U.S.
- Listed height: 6 ft 5 in (1.96 m)
- Listed weight: 310 lb (141 kg)

Career information
- High school: Fayetteville (Fayetteville, Arkansas)
- College: Colorado State
- NFL draft: 2006: undrafted

Career history
- Houston Texans (2006–2011); → Hamburg Sea Devils (2007); Oakland Raiders (2012–2013)

Awards and highlights
- Second-team All-MW (2005)

Career NFL statistics
- Games played: 80
- Games started: 77
- Stats at Pro Football Reference

Michael Scott Brisiel (born March 14, 1983) is an American former professional football player who was a guard in the National Football League (NFL). He played college football for the Colorado State Rams and was signed by the Houston Texans as an undrafted free agent in 2006.

Brisiel was also a member of the Hamburg Sea Devils and Oakland Raiders.

== Early life ==
Born in San Marcos, Texas, Brisiel graduated from Fayetteville High School in Fayetteville, Arkansas in 2001. In addition to football, Brisiel also played on the baseball and track and field teams at Fayetteville High. As a high school football player, Brisiel was selected to the all-Arkansas team. He played college football for the Colorado State Rams. At Colorado State, Brisiel played for three seasons from 2002 to 2004 after redshirting his freshman year. He was an All-Mountain West Conference honorable mention in 2004.

== Professional career ==
=== Houston Texans ===
Brisiel was originally signed by the Texans as an undrafted free agent in 2006. He played two preseason games with the Texans as a rookie and spent the regular season on the practice squad. Prior to the 2007 NFL season, Brisiel played as center with the NFL Europe team Hamburg Sea Devils.

In 2007, Brisiel started 4 games, replacing Fred Weary at right guard between Chris Myers and Eric Winston. In 2008, these three started all 16 games and, except for injuries, were together up to the end of the 2011 NFL season. On October 12, 2008, Brisiel was a key factor in the final offensive play of the Houston Texans' 29–28 comeback victory over the Miami Dolphins at Reliant Stadium. While the wide receivers pulled defensive attention towards the sidelines on the Texans' last-ditch 4th-and-2 play, Brisiel blocked the one defensive lineman who had a chance to tackle quarterback Matt Schaub as he ran the ball in from 3 yards out for the decisive score.

Brisiel started only 5 games in 2009, replaced by Chris White, then 9 in 2010 and 13 in 2011, when he played in his first playoff game, a win against the Cincinnati Bengals, followed by a loss to the Baltimore Ravens.

=== Oakland Raiders ===
Brisiel signed with the Oakland Raiders (headquartered in Alameda, California) on March 16, 2012. He was released on April 1, 2014.
