= Michael Harden =

American football player (born 1981)

No. 25, 36, 23
- Position: Cornerback

Personal information
- Born: October 21, 1981 (age 45); Kansas City, Missouri, U.S.
- Listed height: 5 ft 11 in (1.80 m)
- Listed weight: 190 lb (86 kg)

Career information
- High school: Southeast (Kansas City)
- College: Missouri
- NFL draft: 2004: undrafted

Career history
- Seattle Seahawks (2004–2005)*; Berlin Thunder (2005); San Francisco 49ers (2005)*; New England Patriots (2005)*; Seattle Seahawks (2005); Hamburg Sea Devils (2007); Hamilton Tiger-Cats (2007)
- * Offseason or practice squad member only

Awards and highlights
- World Bowl champion (XV)

Career NFL statistics
- Games played: 4
- Tackles: 7
- Sacks: 0
- Interceptions: 0
- Stats at Pro Football Reference

Michael D. Harden (born October 21, 1981) is an American former professional football player who was a cornerback in the National Football League (NFL). He was signed by the Seattle Seahawks as an undrafted free agent in 2004. He played college football for the Missouri Tigers.

Harden was also a member of the Berlin Thunder, San Francisco 49ers, New England Patriots, Hamburg Sea Devils and Hamilton Tiger-Cats.
