= Brent Grimes =

American football player (born 1983)

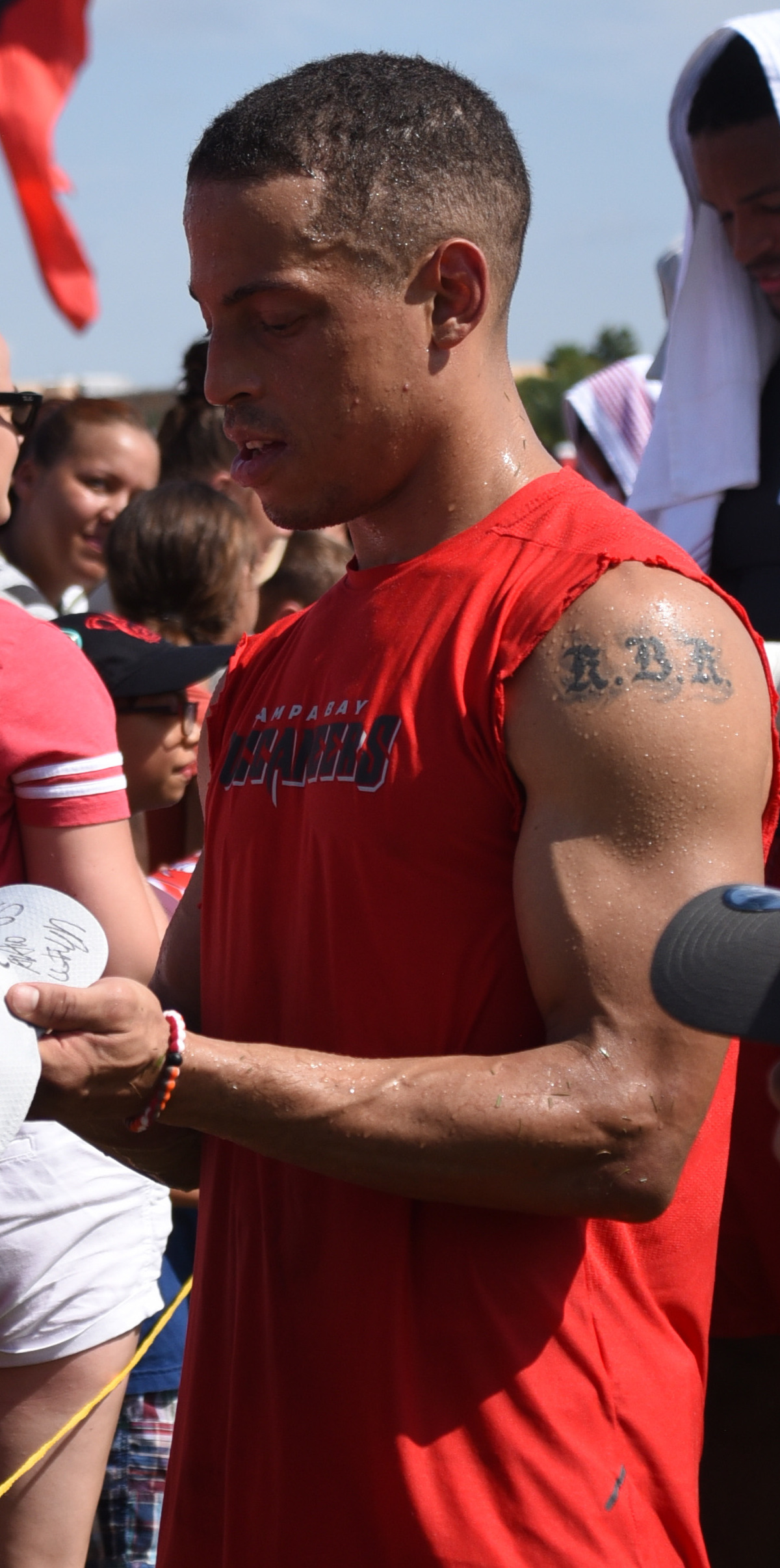
- Grimes in 2018

No. 43, 20, 21, 24
- Position: Cornerback

Personal information
- Born: July 19, 1983 (age 43); Philadelphia, Pennsylvania, U.S.
- Listed height: 5 ft 10 in (1.78 m)
- Listed weight: 185 lb (84 kg)

Career information
- High school: Northeast (Philadelphia)
- College: Shippensburg (2002–2005)
- NFL draft: 2006: undrafted

Career history
- Atlanta Falcons (2006–2012); → Hamburg Sea Devils (2007); Miami Dolphins (2013–2015); Tampa Bay Buccaneers (2016–2018)

Awards and highlights
- Second-team All-Pro (2014); 4× Pro Bowl (2010, 2013–2015); World Bowl champion (XV); 3× DII All-American (2003–2005)

Career NFL statistics
- Total tackles: 575
- Forced fumbles: 4
- Fumble recoveries: 2
- Pass deflections: 140
- Interceptions: 33
- Defensive touchdowns: 3
- Stats at Pro Football Reference

Brent Omar Grimes (born July 19, 1983) is an American former professional football player who was a cornerback in the National Football League (NFL). He played college football at Shippensburg University and signed with the Atlanta Falcons as an undrafted free agent in 2006. Grimes was allocated to the Hamburg Sea Devils of NFL Europa in 2006 and was part of the team that won World Bowl XV.

== Professional career ==
Pre-draft measurables
Height	Weight	40-yard dash	20-yard shuttle	Three-cone drill	Vertical jump	Broad jump	Bench press
5 ft 9 1/4 in (1.76 m)	177 lb (80 kg)	4.57 s	4.25 s	7.13 s	33 1/2 in (0.85 m)	10 ft 1 in (3.07 m)	4 reps
All results from Shippensburg's Pro Day

=== Atlanta Falcons ===
==== 2006 ====
On May 16, 2006, the Atlanta Falcons signed Grimes to three-year, $1.08 million contract after he went undrafted in the 2006 NFL draft.

During training camp, Grimes competed for a roster spot as a backup cornerback and special teams player. He competed against Chris Cash, Allen Rossum, and Omare Lowe before sustaining a groin injury. He was subsequently waived by the Atlanta Falcons during training camp.

==== 2007 ====
On January 10, 2007, the Atlanta Falcons signed Grimes to a reserve/futures contract and immediately allocated him to play overseas in NFL Europa. Grimes was initially acquired by the Amsterdam Admirals before becoming a part of the Rhein Fire and then joined the Hamburg Sea Devils. He started at cornerback for the Sea Devils and helped them achieve a 7–3 record and finish first in their division. On June 23, 2007, Grimes appeared in World Bowl XV and was part of the Hamburg Sea Devils team that defeated the Frankfurt Galaxy 37–28.

After winning World Bowl XV, Grimes returned to the Atlanta Falcons and attended organized team activities and training camp. Throughout camp, Grimes competed against Antoine Harris and David Irons for a job as a backup cornerback and special teams player. On September 2, 2007, the Atlanta Falcons waived Grimes as part of their final roster cuts, but re-signed him to their practice squad the following day.

On December 17, 2007, the Atlanta Falcons promoted Grimes to their active roster after cornerback Lewis Sanders tore his pectoral muscle and was placed on injured reserve. On December 12, 2007, head coach Bobby Petrino resigned from his position after only 13 games where the Falcons finished with a 3–10 record. Petrino decided to accept the vacant head coaching job at Arkansas after quarterback Michael Vick was arrested for operating an unlawful interstate dog fighting venture. Interim head coach Emmitt Thomas named Grimes the third cornerback on the depth chart, behind DeAngelo Hall and Chris Houston. On December 23, 2007, Grimes made his professional regular season debut and recorded a season-high 11 combined tackles (ten solo) during a 30–27 loss at the Arizona Cardinals in Week 16. He completed his rookie season in 2007 with 12 combined tackles (11 solo) in two games and no starts.

==== 2008 ====
Throughout training camp, Grimes competed to be a starting cornerback after DeAngelo Hall was traded to the Oakland Raiders. He competed against Von Hutchins, David Irons, and Chevis Jackson. Grimes quickly rose up the depth chart and surprised many analysts with his performances in training camp. The Atlanta Falcons' new head coach, Mike Smith, named Grimes a starting cornerback to begin the 2008 regular season, along with Chris Houston.

He made his first career start in the Atlanta Falcons' season-opener against the Washington Redskins and recorded a season-high six solo tackles in their 34–21 victory. On September 21, 2008, Grimes made one tackle, two pass deflections, and made his first career interception off a pass by quarterback Tyler Thigpen during a 38–14 win against the Kansas City Chiefs in Week 3. The following week, he collected a season-high ten combined tackles (nine solo) and broke up a pass in the Falcons' 24–9 loss at the Carolina Panthers in Week 4. In Week 8, Grimes was benched in favor of Domonique Foxworth during the Falcons' loss at the Philadelphia Eagles. On November 6, 2008, head coach Mike Smith stated Domonique Foxworth would remain the starter for the rest of the season. He was inactive for a Week 11 loss to the Denver Broncos due to an ankle injury. Grimes was sidelined for three more games (Weeks 13–15) after injuring his knee. He completed the 2008 season with 34 combined tackles (30 solo), six passes defensed, and an interception in 12 games and six starts.

The Atlanta Falcons finished second in the NFC South with an 11–5 record and clinched a wildcard berth. On January 3, 2009, Grimes appeared in his first career playoff game as the Falcons lost 30–24 at the Arizona Cardinals in the NFC Wildcard Game.

==== 2009 ====
During training camp, Grimes competed for a job as a starting cornerback against Chris Owens, Von Hutchins, Chevis Jackson, and David Irons. Head coach Mike Smith named Grimes and Chris Houston the starting cornerbacks to begin the regular season.

On November 22, 2009, Grimes collected a season-high ten combined tackles (eight solo), two pass deflections, and an interception during a 34–31 loss at the New York Giants. In Week 15, he recorded six solo tackles, deflected two passes, and intercepted two pass attempts by quarterback Mark Sanchez in the Falcons' 10–7 victory at the New York Jets. The following week, Grimes collected a season-high nine solo tackles, a pass deflection, and an interception during a 31–3 win against the Buffalo Bills in Week 16. On December 29, 2009, it was announced that Grimes was selected to be an alternate for the 2010 Pro Bowl. On January 3, 2010, Grimes made two solo tackles, a season-high three pass deflections, and intercepted a pass by Josh Freeman in a 20–10 victory at the Tampa Bay Buccaneers in Week 17. His interception marked his third consecutive game with a pick. Grimes finished the 2009 season with 66 combined tackles (62 solo), 13 pass deflections, and a season-high six interceptions in 16 games and eight starts.

==== 2010 ====
During training camp, Grimes competed for a job as a starting cornerback against Chris Owens. Head coach Mike Smith named Grimes and newly acquired free agent Dunta Robinson the starting cornerbacks to begin the 2010 regular season.

On October 17, 2010, Grimes collected a season-high 12 combined tackles (ten solo) and a pass deflection in the Falcons' 31–17 loss at the Philadelphia Eagles in Week 6. In Week 13, he made seven combined tackles, a career-high six pass deflections, and intercepted a pass by Josh Freeman during a 28–24 victory at the Tampa Bay Buccaneers. On December 19, 2010, Grimes recorded five pass deflections, three solo tackles, and an interception in a 34–18 win at the Seattle Seahawks in Week 15. Grimes earned NFC Defensive Player of the Week for his performance. He recorded a career-high 87 combined tackles (76 solo), 23 pass deflections, and five interceptions in 16 games and 16 starts.

The Atlanta Falcons finished first in the NFC South with a 13–3 record, clinching home-field advantage and a first round bye. On January 15, 2011, Grimes started in his first career playoff game and collected seven solo tackles in a 48–21 loss to the Green Bay Packers in the NFC Divisional Round. On January 24, 2011, it was announced that Grimes would play in the 2011 Pro Bowl as a replacement for Charles Woodson who was appearing in Super Bowl XLV.

==== 2011 ====
On July 25, 2011, the Atlanta Falcons placed a first round restricted free agent tender on Grimes. On August 4, 2011, Grimes signed his one-year, $2.61 million restricted free agent tender to remain with the Falcons for the 2011 season. Defensive coordinator Brian VanGorder retained Grimes and Dunta Robinson as the starting cornerback duo to begin the regular season. In Week 5, Grimes recorded a season-high seven combined tackles and deflected two passes during a 25–14 loss to the Green Bay Packers. In Week 12, he sustained a knee injury and underwent minor knee surgery that sidelined him for the next three games (Weeks 13–15). Grimes re-injured his knee and was inactive for the Falcons' Week 17 victory against the Tampa Bay Buccaneers and during their NFC Wildcard Game at the New York Giants. He completed the season with 49 combined tackles (37 solo), 14 passes defensed, and an interception in 12 games and 12 starts.

==== 2012 ====
On March 2, 2012, the Atlanta Falcons applied their franchise tag to Grimes for the upcoming 2012 season. On April 24, 2012, Grimes signed his one-year, $10.60 million franchise tag after speculation that the Falcons were seeking a trade to acquire cornerback Asante Samuel.

The Atlanta Falcons' new defensive coordinator Mike Nolan retained Grimes and Dunta Robinson the starting cornerbacks to begin the season, ahead of Asante Samuel. He started in the Atlanta Falcons' season-opener at the Kansas City Chiefs and recorded six solo tackles before exiting in the fourth quarter of their 40–24 victory with a calf injury. On September 11, 2012, the Atlanta Falcons placed Grimes on injured reserve for the rest of the season after it was discovered he would have to undergo surgery for a torn Achilles tendon.

==== 2013 ====
After the 2012 season, Grimes became an unrestricted free agent. The Atlanta Falcons did not offer Grimes a contract. During free agency, Grimes attended visits with the Cleveland Browns and Miami Dolphins.

=== Miami Dolphins ===
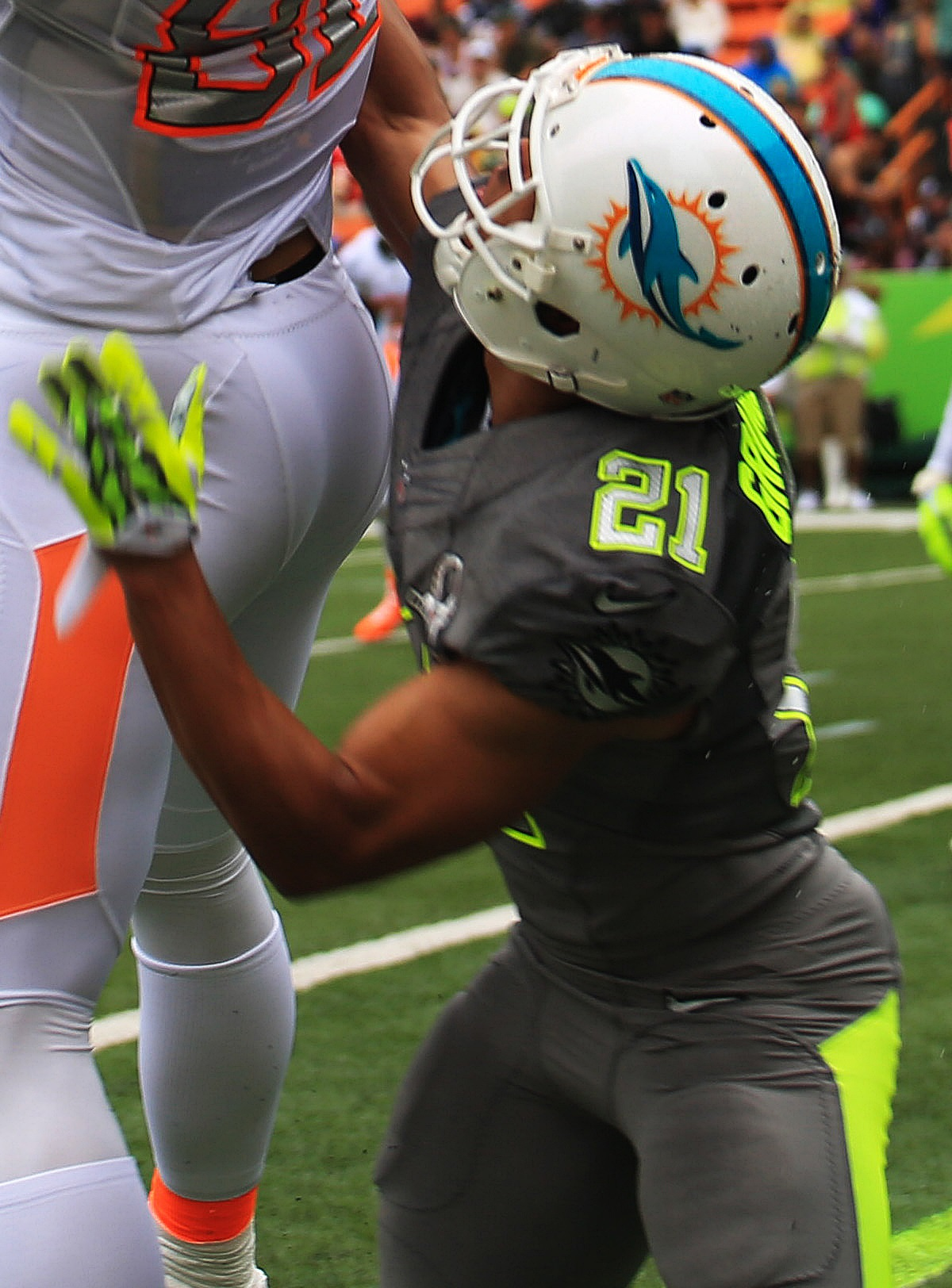
Grimes playing in the 2014 Pro Bowl.

On March 30, 2013, the Miami Dolphins signed Grimes to a one-year, $5.50 million contract with $2.75 million guaranteed.

Grimes entered training camp slated as the No. 1 cornerback on the depth chart and led a young core of cornerbacks that included Will Davis and Jamar Taylor. Head coach Joe Philbin named Grimes the starter to begin the regular season, alongside Dimitri Patterson.

On September 15, 2013, Grimes recorded a season-high three pass deflections, five combined tackles, and intercepted a pass by Andrew Luck during a 24–20 victory at the Indianapolis Colts in Week 2. In Week 9, he collected five solo tackles, deflected a pass, and returned an interception for his first career touchdown in the Dolphins' 22–20 win against the Cincinnati Bengals. He intercepted a pass by quarterback Andy Dalton, that was originally intended for Marvin Jones, and returned it for a 94-yard touchdown in the third quarter. On December 22, 2013, he collected a season-high six combined tackles in the Dolphins' 19–0 loss at the Buffalo Bills in Week 16. On December 23, 2013, Grimes was voted to the 2014 Pro Bowl, marking his third Pro Bowl selection. Grimes completed the 2013 season with a total of 60 combined tackles (52 solo), 17 passes defensed, four interceptions, and a touchdown in 16 games and 16 starts. He ranked as the second best cornerback by Pro Football Focus and was ranked as the 95th best player by his peers on the NFL Top 100 Players of 2014.

==== 2014 ====
On March 3, 2014, the Miami Dolphins signed Grimes to a four-year, $32 million contract that includes $16 million guaranteed and a signing bonus of $6 million. The contract is only guaranteed for the first two seasons and includes an option for the Dolphins to opt-out of the contract in 2016 or 2017.

Defensive coordinator Kevin Coyle retained Grimes as a starting cornerback, alongside Cortland Finnegan. Grimes and Finnegan drew comparisons for their small school pedigree as both entered the league in 2006, stood at 5'10", and became Pro Bowl cornerbacks.

In Week 6, he collected a season-high seven solo tackles and broke up a pass in a 27–24 loss to the Green Bay Packers. On October 26, 2014, Grimes made three combined tackles, a pass deflection, and returned an interception for a touchdown during a 27–13 win at the Jacksonville Jaguars in Week 8. Grimes intercepted a pass attempt by quarterback Blake Bortles, that was intended for wide receiver Cecil Shorts, in the third quarter. The touchdown marked his second career pick six. In Week 9, he made three solo tackles, broke up two passes, and intercepted two passes by Philip Rivers as the Dolphins routed the San Diego Chargers 37–0. He received the AFC Defensive Player of the Week for his performance. The following week, Grimes made two combined tackles, two pass deflections, and an interception during a 20–16 loss at the Detroit Lions in Week 10. He made an impressive one-handed interception off a pass attempt by Matthew Stafford that was originally intended for wide receiver Calvin Johnson in the second quarter. His interception was his fourth pick in the last three games. On December 23, 2014, it was announced that Grimes was selected to his second consecutive Pro Bowl. He finished the 2014 season with 57 combined tackles (47 solo), 12 pass deflections, five interceptions, and a touchdown in 16 games and 16 starts.

==== 2015 ====
Head coach Joe Philbin retained Grimes as the No. 1 cornerback to begin the regular season, along with Jamar Taylor and nickelback Brice McCain. On October 5, 2015, the Miami Dolphins fired head coach Joe Philbin after they began the season with a 1–3 record. Tight ends coach Dan Campbell was named the interim head coach for the remainder of the season. In Week 6, Grimes made a season-high four pass deflections, two combined tackles, and intercepted a pass by Marcus Mariota in a 38–10 victory at the Tennessee Titans. On November 8, 2015, Grimes collected a season-high seven solo tackles in the Dolphins' 33–17 loss to the Buffalo Bills in Week 9. He was inactive for the Dolphins' Week 10 victory at the Philadelphia Eagles due to a rib injury. He finished the 2015 season with 49 combined tackles (42 solo), 14 passes defensed, and four interceptions in 15 games and 15 starts. On January 24, 2016, Grimes was selected to play in the 2016 Pro Bowl after Chris Harris Jr. and Aqib Talib were unable to attend due to the Denver Broncos reaching Super Bowl 50.

==== 2016 ====
On March 7, 2016, Grimes was cut by the Dolphins after he refused to restructure his contract. Miami Dolphins' owner Stephen M. Ross later stated Grimes was released, in part, due to his wife's distracting behavior. His wife had multiple incidents during Grimes' tenure with the Miami Dolphins. Miko Grimes was arrested outside of Sun Life Stadium in September, threatened a Miami Herald reporter over a story questioning Grimes' future with the Dolphins, and publicly criticized quarterback Ryan Tannehill's performance. Regarding Ryan Tannehill, she posted on Twitter, "I knew this qb stunk the minute we signed to this team." Grimes later apologized to Tannehill and stated multiple times to the media his wife's thoughts are her own. After signing with the Tampa Bay Buccaneers, his wife made a post on Instagram where she described the Miami Dolphins as "the dumpster fire of the AFC East."

=== Tampa Bay Buccaneers ===
On March 11, 2016, the Tampa Bay Buccaneers signed Grimes to a two-year, $13.50 million contract that includes $7 million guaranteed. With extra incentives, the contract has a possible total value of $16.50 million. Grimes was reunited with Tampa Bay Buccaneers' defensive coordinator Mike Smith who was his head coach with the Atlanta Falcons.

Head coach Dirk Koetter named Grimes and Alterraun Verner the starting cornerbacks to begin the regular season, ahead of Vernon Hargreaves, Josh Robinson, Jude Adjei-Barimah, and Johnthan Banks. On December 24, 2016, Grimes recorded a season-high nine solo tackles in the Buccaneers' 31–24 loss at the Indianapolis Colts in Week 16. The following week, Grimes made a season-high four pass deflections, recorded four combined tackles, and returned an interception for a touchdown during a 17–16 victory against the Carolina Panthers in Week 17. He intercepted a pass by quarterback Cam Newton, that was intended for wide receiver Ted Ginn Jr., and returned it for a 31-yard touchdown in the third quarter. The touchdown became Grimes' third career pick six. Grimes completed the 2016 season with 57 combined tackles (51 solo), a career-high 24 pass deflections, four interceptions, a forced fumble, and a touchdown in 16 games and 16 starts.

==== 2017 ====
Head coach Dirk Koetter retained Grimes as the No. 1 cornerback to start the regular season, along with Vernon Hargreaves. Grimes was inactive for the Buccaneers' Week 3 loss at the Minnesota Vikings after injuring his shoulder. On October 15, 2017, Grimes recorded a season-high eight combined tackles, deflected two passes, and returned an interception by quarterback Carson Palmer for a 39-yard gain during a 38–33 loss at the Arizona Cardinals in Week 6. He aggravated his shoulder injury and was sidelined for another two games (Weeks 8–9) before returning in Week 10. He completed the 2017 season with 49 combined tackles (44 solo), 11 passes defensed, and three interceptions in 13 games and 13 starts.

==== 2018 ====
On March 12, 2018, the Tampa Bay Buccaneers re-signed Grimes to a fully guaranteed one-year, $7 million contract. The agreement had a potential value of $10 million with incentives. In the 2018 season, Grimes had 48 total tackles (42 solo), six passes defended, and one forced fumble in 13 appearances and starts.

== NFL career statistics ==
Year	Team	Games		Tackles				Fumbles			Interceptions					
Year	Team	GP	GS	Cmb	Solo	Ast	Sck	FF	FR	Yds	Int	Yds	Avg	Lng	TD	PD
2007	ATL	2	0	12	11	1	0.0	0	0	0	0	0	0.0	0	0	0
2008	ATL	12	6	34	30	4	0.0	0	0	0	1	25	25.0	25	0	6
2009	ATL	16	8	66	62	4	0.0	0	1	0	6	17	2.8	11	0	13
2010	ATL	16	16	87	76	11	0.0	0	0	0	5	84	16.8	36	0	23
2011	ATL	12	12	49	37	12	0.0	1	0	0	1	29	29.0	29	0	14
2012	ATL	1	1	6	6	0	0.0	0	0	0	0	0	0.0	0	0	0
2013	MIA	16	16	60	52	8	0.0	0	0	0	4	102	25.5	94	1	17
2014	MIA	16	16	57	47	10	0.0	1	0	0	5	80	16.0	32	1	12
2015	MIA	15	15	49	42	7	0.0	0	0	0	4	20	5.0	17	0	14
2016	TB	16	16	57	51	6	0.0	1	0	0	4	37	9.2	31	1	24
2017	TB	13	13	49	44	5	0.0	0	0	0	3	67	22.3	39	0	11
2018	TB	13	13	48	42	6	0.0	1	0	0	0	0	0.0	0	0	6
Career		148	132	574	500	74	0.0	4	1	0	33	461	14	94	3	140

== Personal life ==
Grimes is the son of Pennsylvania resident Deborah "Debbie" Hall. Brent is married to Miko Grimes, a former professional basketball player and former sports talk show host. They married in 2010, and their son, Aiden, was born that same year.
