= Jimmy Verdon =

American gridiron football player (born 1981)

No. 79
- Position: Defensive tackle

Personal information
- Born: November 4, 1981 (age 45); Pomona, California, U.S.
- Listed height: 6 ft 3 in (1.91 m)
- Listed weight: 280 lb (127 kg)

Career information
- High school: Pomona
- College: Arizona State
- NFL draft: 2005: 7th round, 232nd overall pick

Career history
- New Orleans Saints (2005); Cincinnati Bengals (2007–2008)*; Hamburg Sea Devils (2007); Saskatchewan Roughriders (2008)
- * Offseason or practice squad member only

Awards and highlights
- Second-team All-Pac-10 (2004)
- Stats at Pro Football Reference

Jimmy Verdon (born November 4, 1981) is an American former professional football player who was a defensive end in the National Football League (NFL). He was selected by the New Orleans Saints in the seventh round of the 2005 NFL draft. He played college football for the Arizona State Sun Devils.

Verdon was also a member of the Cincinnati Bengals and Saskatchewan Roughriders.

== Early life ==
Verdon attended Pomona High School in Pomona, California, and played free safety, fullback and quarterback.

== College career ==
Verdon attended Arizona State University. He earned second-team All-Pac-10 honors and was voted the team's Most Valuable Defensive Player in 2004. During his college career, he played in 49 games with 38 starts, making 155 tackles and 10 sacks. He majored in interdisciplinary studies/education and sociology.

== Professional career ==
=== New Orleans Saints ===
Verdon was selected by the New Orleans Saints in the seventh round (232nd overall) in the 2005 NFL draft. During a pre-season game against the New England Patriots, he returned a fumble for a touchdown. He made his NFL debut at the Atlanta Falcons on December 12.

After playing the preseason for the Saints, he was waived on September 8.

=== Cincinnati Bengals ===
He signed with the Cincinnati Bengals as a free agent on January 2, 2007, and was allocated to the Hamburg Sea Devils of the NFL Europa. On May 12, he suffered a torn right knee ligament and would spend the entire 2007 season on the NFL Europa Non-Football Injury list.

On April 11, 2008, Verdon was waived by the Bengals.

=== Saskatchewan Roughriders ===
On June 15, 2008, he was signed to a contract with the Saskatchewan Roughriders of the CFL. He was released by the Riders following training camp on June 21, 2008. On June 23, 2008, he was added to the Riders Developmental Squad.

== Personal life ==
He has four children. He is married to Alexis (Johnson) Verdon and now resides in Mason, Ohio, with their three children.
