= Marcus Lawrence =

American football player (born 1982)

No. 46
- Position: Linebacker

Personal information
- Born: June 21, 1982 (age 44); Aiken, South Carolina, U.S.
- Listed height: 6 ft 3 in (1.91 m)
- Listed weight: 236 lb (107 kg)

Career information
- High school: Silver Bluff (Aiken)
- College: South Carolina
- NFL draft: 2005: undrafted

Career history
- Carolina Panthers (2005)*; New York Giants (2005); Minnesota Vikings (2006)*; Hamburg Sea Devils (2007)*
- * Offseason or practice squad member only
- Stats at Pro Football Reference

Marcus Lawrence (born June 21, 1982) is an American former professional football linebacker who played for the New York Giants of the National Football League (NFL). He played college football for the South Carolina Gamecocks.

== Early life ==
Marcus Lawrence was born on June 21, 1982, in Aiken, South Carolina. He attended Silver Bluff High School in Aiken.

== College career ==
Lawrence first played college football at Butler Community College from 2001 to 2002. He averaged 9.1 tackles per game during the 2002 season. Lawrence was then a two-year letterman for the South Carolina Gamecocks from 2003 to 2004. He had 156 tackles in two years with the Gamecocks, and scored a safety in 2004.

== Professional career ==
After going undrafted in the 2005 NFL draft, Lawrence signed with the Carolina Panthers on April 29, 2005. He was waived on August 29, 2005.

Lawrence was signed to the practice squad of the New York Giants on November 1, 2005. He was promoted to the active roster on January 3, 2006. He played in the Giants' 23–0 playoff loss to the Panthers on January 8, 2006, and posted one solo tackle. Lawrence was waived by New York on May 15, 2006.

Lawrence was claimed off waivers by the Minnesota Vikings on May 18, 2006. He was waived on August 26, 2006.

In February 2007, Lawrence was drafted by the Hamburg Sea Devils of NFL Europa. However, he was placed on injured reserve and never played for the Sea Devils.
