= Byron Hardmon =

American football player and coach (born 1981)

Current position
- Title: Outside linebackers coach
- Team: Florida
- Conference: SEC

Biographical details
- Born: January 7, 1981 (age 45); Jacksonville, Florida, U.S.

Playing career
- 1999–2002: Florida
- 2003: Miami Dolphins*
- 2003: Cologne Centurions
- 2004: Seattle Seahawks*
- 2005: Tampa Bay Buccaneers*
- 2006–2007: Hamburg Sea Devils
- Position: Linebacker

Coaching career (HC unless noted)
- 2008–2011: Illinois (GA)
- 2012: Charleston Southern (STC/OLB)
- 2013–2015: Idaho (DL)
- 2015–2024: Troy (DL)
- 2024–2025: Tulane (OLB/DRGC)
- 2026–present: Florida (OLB)

Accomplishments and honors

Championships
- SEC Championship (2000)

Awards
- Second-team All-SEC (2002)

Byron Bernard "Bam" Hardmon (born January 7, 1981) is an American college football coach and former professional football player. Hardmon played college football for the Florida Gators. He signed with the Miami Dolphins as an undrafted free agent, but spent his rookie season on injured reserve. Hardmon subsequently played professional football for the Hamburg Sea Devils in NFL Europa, and in NFL pre-season games with the Seattle Seahawks and Tampa Bay Buccaneers.

== Early years ==
Hardmon was born in Jacksonville, Florida, in 1981. Hardmon earned the nickname "Bam Bam" in his youth and it was later shortened to "Bam". He attended Edward H. White High School in Jacksonville, and played high school football for the Ed White Commanders. Hardmon was an all-state and prep All-American who was selected to play in the Georgia-Florida High School All-Star Game at the Georgia Dome in June 1999.

== College career ==
Hardmon received an athletic scholarship to attend the University of Florida in Gainesville, Florida, where he played for coach Steve Spurrier and coach Ron Zook's Gators teams from 1999 to 2002. He was a mainstay of the Gators' defense from 2000 to 2002, appearing in 12 games for the 2000 team that was ranked No. 10 in the final AP poll, 11 games for the 2001 team that was ranked No. 3 in the final AP poll, and 13 games for the 2002 that was ranked No. 24 in the final Coaches Poll. Prior to his senior year, the South Florida Sun-Sentinel wrote that Hardmon and fellow senior Mike Nattiel "appear to have the talent, the experience and – finally – the maturity to lead Florida's defense." Hardmon established himself as a team captain on defense in 2002, as he led the team with 169 tackles and also had two forced fumbles and an interception. At the end of the 2002 season, the USA Today described Hardmon and Nattiel as the anchors of the Gators defense. Following his senior season, he received the Gators' Fergie Ferguson Award, recognizing the "senior football player who displays outstanding leadership, character and courage."

== Professional career ==
He was signed by the Miami Dolphins in April 2003, but he spent his rookie season on "injured reserve" status. In the spring of 2004, Hardmon signed with the Hamburg Sea Devils in the NFL Europa. After playing well in his first season of professional football with Hamburg, he was signed by the Seattle Seahawks in June 2004. Hardmon was released by the Seahawks on September 6, 2004. In 2005, Hardmon signed with the Tampa Bay Buccaneers. In 2007, Hardmon was one of the leaders of the Hamburg team that defeated the Frankfurt Galaxy 37–28 in the World Bowl. He was also named Defensive Player of the Week in Week 5 of the 2007 NFL Europa season, after he led Hamburg to a victory over the Amsterdam Admirals with a 34-yard interception return for a touchdown, four tackles, a sack, a quarterback hurry and two pass defenses.
