= Ben Ishola =

German gridiron football player (born 1980)

No. 64, 91
- Position: Defensive end

Personal information
- Born: June 8, 1980 (age 46); Berlin, Germany
- Listed height: 6 ft 3 in (1.91 m)
- Listed weight: 255 lb (116 kg)

Career information
- College: Indiana
- NFL draft: 2006: undrafted

Career history
- Miami Dolphins (2006)*; Hamburg Sea Devils (2007); Indianapolis Colts (2007–2008)*; Montreal Alouettes (2008)*; Cincinnati Bengals (2008)*; Toronto Argonauts (2009–2011)
- * Offseason or practice squad member only

Awards and highlights
- NFL Europa Defensive P.O.Y. (2007)

Career CFL statistics
- Total tackles: 2
- Stats at CFL.ca (archived)

Ben Ishola (born June 8, 1980) is a German former professional gridiron football defensive end. He played for the Toronto Argonauts of the Canadian Football League (CFL). He was signed by the Miami Dolphins as an undrafted free agent in 2006. He played college football at Indiana.

Ishola was born in Berlin, Germany; his father is Nigerian.

Ishola was also a member of the Hamburg Sea Devils, Indianapolis Colts, Montreal Alouettes, and the Cincinnati Bengals.
