= Justin Kurpeikis =

American football player (born 1977)

No. 90, 47
- Position: Linebacker

Personal information
- Born: July 17, 1977 (age 49); Allison Park, Pennsylvania, U.S.
- Listed height: 6 ft 3 in (1.91 m)
- Listed weight: 254 lb (115 kg)

Career information
- High school: Central Catholic (Pittsburgh, Pennsylvania)
- College: Penn State
- NFL draft: 2001: undrafted

Career history
- Pittsburgh Steelers (2001–2002); New England Patriots (2003)*;(2004); Cleveland Browns (2005–2006)*; Pittsburgh Steelers (2006)*; Hamburg Sea Devils (2007); Detroit Lions (2007)*
- * Offseason or practice squad member only

Awards and highlights
- Super Bowl champion (XXXIX); First-team All-Big Ten (2000)

Career NFL statistics
- Tackles: 7
- Stats at Pro Football Reference

Justin William Kurpeikis (July 17, 1977) is an American former professional football player. He played for the Pittsburgh Steelers, New England Patriots, Cleveland Browns, Detroit Lions, and Hamburg Sea Devils.

== Playing career ==
Kurpeikis attended the Central Catholic High School in Pittsburgh where he was a high school All-American linebacker selection. He was also a standout sprinter and shot putter on the track team.

Kurpeikis played college football at Penn State, finishing his career with 172 tackles, 17 sacks and 43 stops for losses. He also twice earned Academic All-Big Ten honors and was included in the second-team All-Big Ten in 2000.

Kurpeikis He signed as an undrafted free agent with the Pittsburgh Steelers in 2001, and spent the 2001 and 2002 seasons with the franchise. In 2003, he joined the New England Patriots as member of practice squad and spent the 2003 and 2004 seasons with the team, also winning Super Bowl XXXIX. Kurpeikis spent the 2005 season as member of the Cleveland Browns practice squad. Kurpeikis began the 2007 season as member of NFL Europa's Hamburg Sea Devils, before signing as a free agent with the Detroit Lions on August 9, 2007.

== Coaching career ==
Kurpeikis served as an assistant coach with the State College ninth grade Little Lions football team in State College, Pennsylvania, leading the team to a 6–2 record overall. In a 2005 interview with Mark Harrington, Justin exclaimed that "The advice I want to give to everyone out there, "No matter up or down, you have to constantly strive for more and more and never be satisfied. People have their backs against the wall and in tough situations and they have two choices: cower or come out swinging... I would advise you all to come out swinging!"
