= Robert Durham (American football) =

American football player (born 1983)

No. 3
- Position: Defensive back

Personal information
- Born: June 1, 1983 (age 43)
- Listed height: 5 ft 11 in (1.80 m)
- Listed weight: 205 lb (93 kg)

Career information
- High school: Love Joy High School
- College: Tuskegee
- NFL draft: 2006: undrafted

Career history
- Hamburg Sea Devils (2007); Amsterdam Admirals (2007); Columbus Destroyers (2008); Alabama Vipers (2010); Georgia Force (2011–2012)

Career AFL statistics
- Tackles: 145
- Forced Fumbles: 4
- Fumble Recoveries: 1
- Interceptions: 4
- Touchdowns: 1
- Stats at ArenaFan.com

Robert 'Rob' Durham (born June 1, 1983) is an American former professional football defensive back.

== Professional career ==
=== Hamburg Sea Devils ===
In 2007, Durham was drafted by the Hamburg Sea Devils. He did not record any statistics.

=== Amsterdam Admirals ===
Durham finished 2007 with the Amsterdam Admirals. He did not record any statistics.

=== Columbus Destroyers ===
In 2008, Durham was assigned to the Columbus Destroyers. He saw minimal action for the Destroyers, recording just 5 tackles on the season.

=== Alabama Vipers ===
In 2010, Durham was assigned to the Alabama Vipers. He saw much more action, recording 31 tackles.

=== Georgia Force ===
In 2011, Durham signed with the Georgia Force. He has his most productive season thus far, registering 80 tackles and 3 interceptions in 2011. He has re-signed with the Force for the 2012 season.
