= Gary Gibson (American football) =

American football player (born 1982)

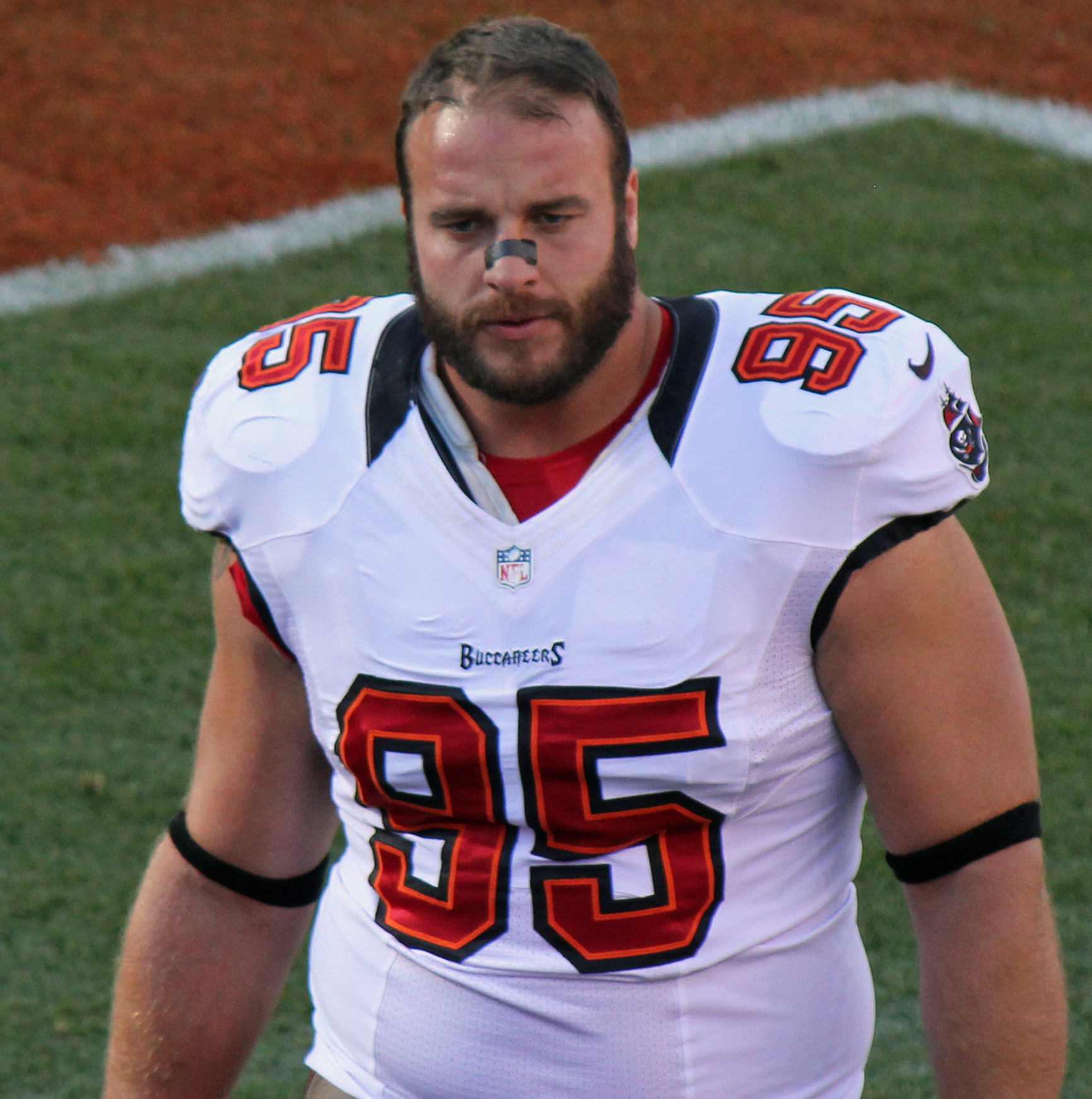
- Gibson with the Tampa Bay Buccaneers in 2012

No. 91, 71, 95
- Position: Defensive tackle

Personal information
- Born: May 5, 1982 (age 44); Plant City, Florida, U.S.
- Listed height: 6 ft 3 in (1.91 m)
- Listed weight: 312 lb (142 kg)

Career information
- High school: LaFayette (NY)
- College: Rutgers
- NFL draft: 2005: undrafted

Career history
- Baltimore Ravens (2005); Carolina Panthers (2007–2008); → Hamburg Sea Devils (2007); St. Louis Rams (2009–2011); Tampa Bay Buccaneers (2012–2013)

Awards and highlights
- All-NFL Europa (2007)

Career NFL statistics
- Total tackles: 77
- Sacks: 3
- Fumble recoveries: 1
- Pass deflections: 5
- Stats at Pro Football Reference

Gary Gibson (born May 5, 1982) is an American former professional football player who was a defensive tackle in the National Football League (NFL). He was signed by the Baltimore Ravens as an undrafted free agent in 2005. He played college football for the Rutgers Scarlet Knights.

Gibson was also a member of the Hamburg Sea Devils, Carolina Panthers, St. Louis Rams, and Tampa Bay Buccaneers.

== College career ==
Gibson played in 44 games with 32 starts at Rutgers and totaled 114 tackles, 6.0 sacks, two forced fumbles and two fumble recoveries, He played in 10 games with eight starts as a senior and produced 25 tackles with 2.5 sacks. He was named co-winner of team’s Most Improved Player Award as a junior and started all 12 games that season and recorded a career-high 44 tackles. He started all 12 games as a sophomore and tallied 32 tackles. Gibson appeared in 10 games as a freshman. He red shirted as a true freshman in 2000.

== Professional career ==
=== Baltimore Ravens ===
Gibson signed as an undrafted rookie free agent by Baltimore on April 29, 2005 and was placed on the reserve/injured list on August 30, 2005.

=== Carolina Panthers ===
He then signed as a free agent by Carolina in June, 2007, and was signed to the practice squad by Carolina in August and then was signed to the active roster on November 7, 2007 and recorded a tackle. Gibson re-signed as an unrestricted free agent by Carolina March 5, 2008. Gibson played 11 games and recorded nine tackles for the Panthers in the 2008 season.

=== St. Louis Rams ===
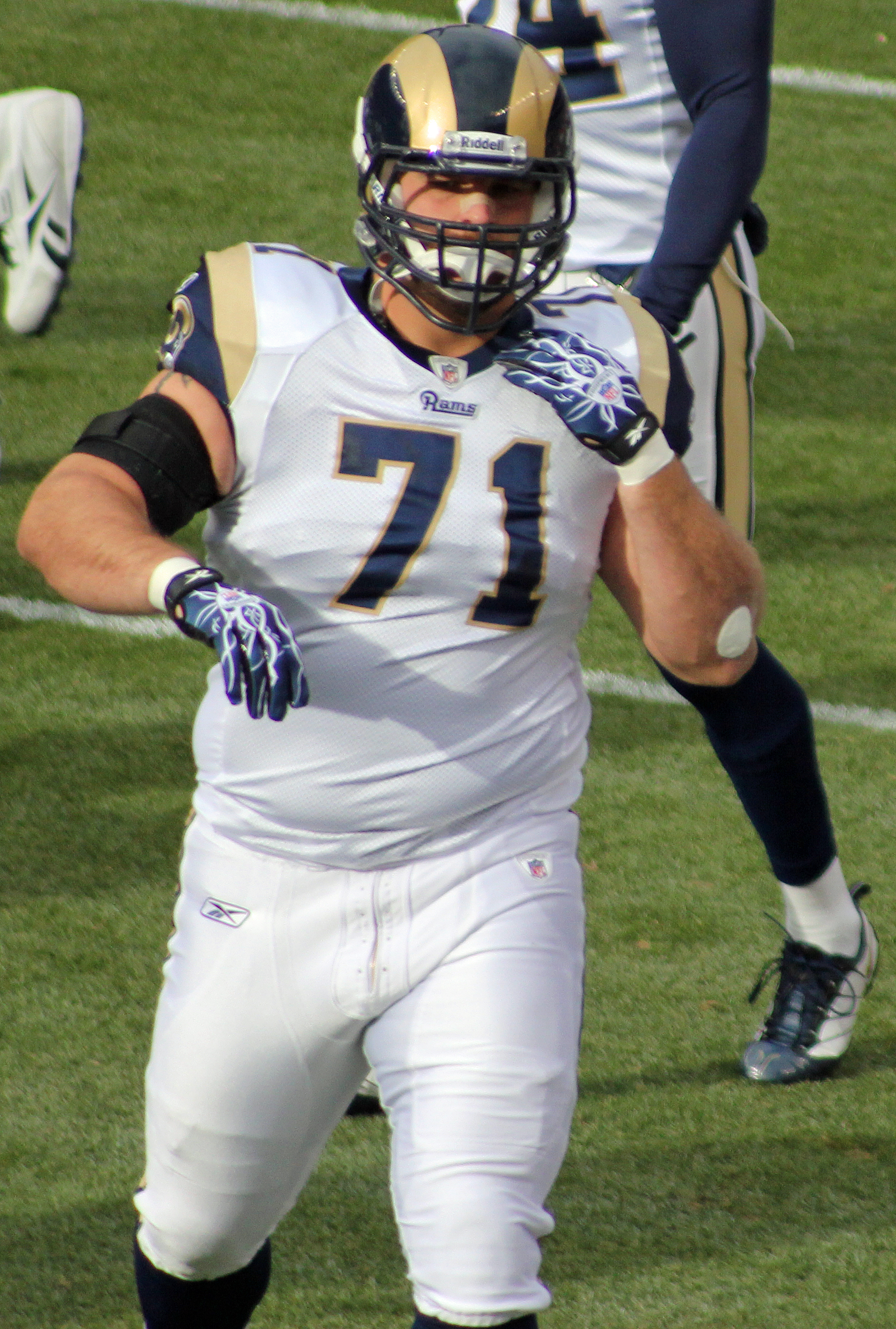
Gibson in 2010 while with the Rams

Signed as a free agent by the St. Louis Rams April 20, 2009. He was a starter for three Rams preseason games in 2009 and is on the active roster. He was also the starter at left defensive tackle for the first five games of 2009, until a knee injury put him on the injured reserve for the rest of the 2009 NFL season.

=== Tampa Bay Buccaneers ===
Gibson signed with the Tampa Bay Buccaneers on May 3, 2012.
