= Marcus Maxwell =

American football player (born 1983)

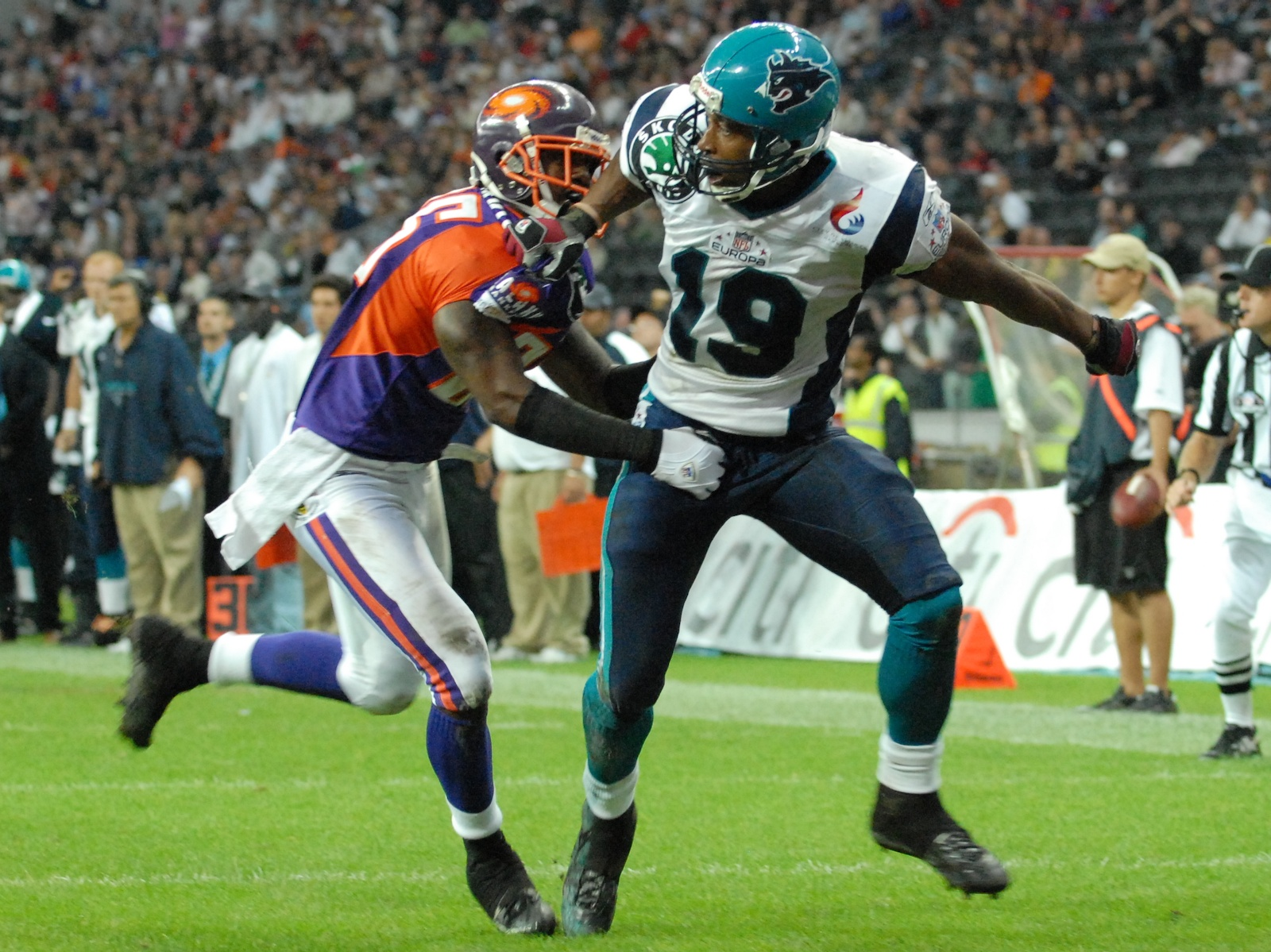
- Maxwell (19) with the Hamburg Sea Devils of NFL Europa

No. 19, 10, 11, 13
- Position: Wide receiver

Personal information
- Born: July 8, 1983 (age 43); Berkeley, California, U.S.
- Listed height: 6 ft 3 in (1.91 m)
- Listed weight: 210 lb (95 kg)

Career information
- High school: Pinole Valley (Pinole, California)
- College: Oregon
- NFL draft: 2005: 7th round, 223rd overall pick

Career history
- San Francisco 49ers (2005–2006); Hamburg Sea Devils (2007); Cincinnati Bengals (2007–2008); Baltimore Ravens (2008); Tampa Bay Buccaneers (2009)*; Florida Tuskers (2009); Seattle Seahawks (2010)*; Sacramento Mountain Lions (2010–2011)
- * Offseason or practice squad member only

Awards and highlights
- World Bowl champion (XV); All-NFL Europa (2007)

Career NFL statistics
- Receptions: 1
- Receiving yards: 5
- Stats at Pro Football Reference

Marcus James Maxwell (born July 8, 1983) is an American former professional football player who was a wide receiver in the National Football League (NFL). He played college football for the Oregon Ducks and was selected by the San Francisco 49ers in the seventh round of the 2005 NFL draft.

Maxwell was also a member of the Hamburg Sea Devils, Cincinnati Bengals, Baltimore Ravens, Tampa Bay Buccaneers, Florida Tuskers, Seattle Seahawks, and Sacramento Mountain Lions.

== Early life ==
As a senior at Pinole Valley High School in Pinole, California, Maxwell caught 42 passes for 866 yards (20.61 yards per reception average) and 13 touchdowns alongside teammate Jack Chu who was devastated with a shoulder injury.

== College career ==
Maxwell attended Diablo Valley College before attending the University of Oregon. As a sophomore at Diablo Valley Junior College, he received 40 passes for 601 yards (15.04 yards per reception avg.), and won first-team All-Golden Gate Conference honors. At the University of Oregon, he received 36 passes for 401 yards (11.1 yards per reception avg.), and two touchdowns. He was a sociology major.

== Professional career ==
=== San Francisco 49ers ===
Maxwell was selected by the 49ers in the seventh round (223rd overall) in the 2005 NFL draft. He was released by the 49ers on September 2, 2006. On September 26, 2006, he was again signed to the practice squad of the 49ers. He was allocated to the Hamburg Sea Devils of NFL Europa for the 2007 season where he led his team, and won World Bowl XV scoring the last touchdown in NFL Europe history. Maxwell failed to make it out of the 49ers training camp in 2007.

=== Cincinnati Bengals ===
On October 4, 2007, he was signed to the practice squad of the Cincinnati Bengals, and elevated to the active roster. He went appeared in five games for the Bengals that year, catching one pass for five yards.

Maxwell suffered a groin injury after practice during the 2008 training camp and was placed on season-ending injured reserve on August 22. He had stayed after practice to run what he called "the 9 route" and suffered an injury to his groin when leaping too far for a ball. He was released on October 15.

=== Baltimore Ravens ===
Maxwell was signed by the Baltimore Ravens on November 11, 2008. He did not appear in any games with the team that season and was placed on injured reserve on December 31.

Though he was non-tendered as a restricted free agent in the 2009 offseason, Maxwell was re-signed by the Ravens on March 2, 2009. He was waived on May 18.

=== Tampa Bay Buccaneers ===
Maxwell was signed by the Tampa Bay Buccaneers on August 17, 2009, after punter Josh Bidwell was placed on injured reserve.

=== Seattle Seahawks ===
Maxwell signed with the Seattle Seahawks on May 18, 2010. He was waived/injured on August 10.

=== Sacramento Mountain Lions ===
Maxwell was signed by the Sacramento Mountain Lions on September 28, 2010.
