= Mike Jemison =

American football player (born 1983)

Mike Jemiosn
Personal information
- Born: June 3, 1983 (age 43); Greencastle, Pennsylvania, U.S.
- Listed height: 6 ft 1 in (1.85 m)
- Listed weight: 225 lb (102 kg)

Career information
- Position: Running back
- High school: Greencastle-Antrim (Greencastle)
- College: Pittsburgh (2001-2002); IUP (2003-2004)
- NFL draft: 2005: undrafted

Career history
- New York Giants (2005)*; →Hamburg Sea Devils (2006); Pittsburgh Steelers (2006)*; New York Giants (2006)*
- * Offseason or practice squad member only

Mike Jemison (born June 3, 1983, in Greencastle, Pennsylvania) is an American football player who last played running back for the Pittsburgh Steelers of the National Football League and running back for the Hamburg Sea Devils of NFL Europe.

== College career ==
Mike Jemison began his college career at the University of Pittsburgh, where he played in nine games as a reserve halfback and fullback in 2001. Jemison gained 78 yards on 26 carries and caught 4 passes for 39 yards that year and he then shifted to outside linebacker for the Panthers in 2002, recording 14 tackles in 12 games. Soon after that Jemison transferred to Indiana University of Pennsylvania, where he started nine games for the Crimson Hawks in 2003 where he totaled 1,311 yards and 12 touchdowns on 220 carries, the sixth-best season total in school history. Jemison started the first four games of the 2004 season, gaining 456 yards with a pair of touchdowns on 103 rushing attempts. He totaled 1,845 yards on 359 carries (5.1-yard average) with 14 touchdowns during his college career.

== Professional career ==
On May 6, 2005, Mike Jemison was picked up by the New York Giants and played on the practice squad until his release September 13, 2005. Jemison was then picked up by the Pittsburgh Steelers on February 18, 2006. During the 2006 offseason Jemison was drafted by the NFL Europe team the Hamburg Sea Devils in the 10th round. As of Saturday April 22, 2006 Jemison ranks second in NFL Europe with 336 rushing yards and leads all running backs with 18 receptions. He has been given the nickname "Little Bus" by some as a reference to retired Steelers running back Jerome Bettis. He was picked up, again, by the New York Giants (August 2006). He was released on September 2, 2006.
