= 2007 NFL Europa season =

European-American football season

- Duration: April 14, 2007 – June 23, 2007

World Bowl XV
- Date: June 23, 2007
- Venue: Commerzbank-Arena, Frankfurt, Germany
- Champions: Hamburg Sea Devils

NFL Europa seasons
- 2006

The 2007 NFL Europa season was the 15th season in 17 years of the American football league that started out as the World League of American Football. 2007 was the first season the league was known as NFL Europa after being called NFL Europe since 1998. The NFL folded the league after the 2007 season.

NFL Europa League
Team	W	L	T	PCT	PF	PA	Home	Road	STK
Hamburg Sea Devils	7	3	0	.700	231	176	4–1	3–2	W4
Frankfurt Galaxy	7	3	0	.700	254	179	5–0	2–3	W1
Cologne Centurions	6	4	0	.600	205	172	2–3	4–1	L1
Rhein Fire	4	6	0	.400	166	212	2–3	2–3	L1
Amsterdam Admirals	4	6	0	.400	194	250	3–2	1–4	W1
Berlin Thunder	2	8	0	.200	146	207	0–5	2–3	L6

== World Bowl XV ==
World Bowl XV was held on Saturday, June 23, 2007, at Commerzbank-Arena in Frankfurt, Germany. The Hamburg Sea Devils defeated the Frankfurt Galaxy, 37–28.

== Awards ==
Award	Winner	Position	Team
Offensive Player of the Year	J. T. O'Sullivan	QB	Frankfurt Galaxy
Offensive Player of the Year	Derrick Ross	RB	Cologne Centurions
Defensive Player of the Year	Jason Hall	DE	Cologne Centurions
Coach of the Year	Vince Martino	HC	Hamburg Sea Devils

=== All-NFL Europa team ===
==== Offense ====
Position	All-NFL Europa team
Quarterback	J. T. O'Sullivan, Frankfurt
Running back	Derrick Ross, Cologne
Wide receiver	Carlton Brewster, Berlin; Marcus Maxwell, Hamburg; Brandon Middleton, Frankfurt
Tight end	Bobby Blizzard, Cologne
Tackle	Bobby Harris, Frankfurt; Jeremy Parquet, Hamburg
Guard	Matt McChesney, Frankfurt; Pete McMahon, Hamburg
Center	Greg Eslinger, Cologne
National	Scott McCready, Hamburg

==== Defense ====
Position	All-NFL Europa team
Defensive end	Jason Hall, Cologne; Justin Kurpeikis, Hamburg
Defensive tackle	Gary Gibson, Hamburg; Kevin Vickerson, Cologne
Linebacker	Blake Costanzo, Rhein; Philippe Gardent, Cologne; Matt Sinclair, Frankfurt
Cornerback	Kevin House, Cologne; Shirdonya Mitchell, Frankfurt
Safety	Shawn Mayer, Hamburg; Chris Reis, Cologne
National	Ben Ishola, Hamburg

==== Special teams ====
Position	All-NFL Europa team
Placekicker	Rhys Lloyd, Frankfurt
Punter	Danny Baugher, Rhein
Special teamer	Noriaki Kinoshita, Amsterdam
