= Jeremy Parquet =

American gridiron football player (born 1982)

No. 65, 69, 70,77
- Positions: Offensive tackle, offensive guard

Personal information
- Born: April 11, 1982 (age 44); New Orleans, Louisiana, U.S.
- Listed height: 6 ft 7 in (2.01 m)
- Listed weight: 321 lb (146 kg)

Career information
- High school: Destrehan (Destrehan, Louisiana)
- College: Southern Mississippi
- NFL draft: 2005: 7th round, 238th overall pick

Career history
- Kansas City Chiefs (2005); St. Louis Rams (2006–2007); Hamburg Sea Devils (2007); Pittsburgh Steelers (2007–2008); Las Vegas Locomotives (2009); Edmonton Eskimos (2010–2011)

Awards and highlights
- Super Bowl champion (XLIII); First-team All-Conference USA (2003); Second-team All-Conference USA (2004); Freshman All-Conference USA (2001); Senior Bowl (2005); All-NFL Europa (2007); World Bowl champion (XV); UFL champion (2009); Inducted into The University of Southern Mississippi Sports Hall of Fame (2025)

Career NFL statistics
- Games played: 2
- Stats at Pro Football Reference

Jeremy Michael Parquet (born April 11, 1982) is an American former professional football player. He was selected by the Kansas City Chiefs in the seventh round of the 2005 NFL draft. He played college football at Southern Mississippi.

Parquet was also a member of the St. Louis Rams, Pittsburgh Steelers, Las Vegas Locomotives and the Edmonton Eskimos. He earned a Super Bowl ring with the Steelers in Super Bowl XLIII.

== Early life ==
Parquet was a two time All State and All District offensive tackle in high school at Destrehan High School.

== College career ==
Parquet played college football at Southern Mississippi where he played in 44 games starting 39 of them. Starting at offensive guard as a Freshman and Sophomore and at offensive tackle as a Junior and Senior. Parquet was voted team captain as a Junior and Senior as well. He graduated with a degree in Coaching and Sports Administration in December 2003.

Parquet was inducted into the University of Southern Mississippi Sports Hall of Fame in November of 2025.

== Professional career ==
=== Kansas City Chiefs ===
Parquet was selected by the Kansas City Chiefs in the seventh round (238th overall) in the 2005 NFL draft.

=== St. Louis Rams ===
Parquet spent the last five weeks of the 2006 season on the active roster.

He spent 2007 off and on the practice squad and active roster.

=== Pittsburgh Steelers ===
On January 2, 2008, he was added to the Steelers active roster.

Parquet spent the first six weeks of the 2008 regular season on the Steelers' practice squad. He was promoted to the active roster on October 18 after the team waived defensive tackle Scott Paxson.

Parquet was waived by the Steelers during final cuts on September 5, 2009.

=== Las Vegas Locomotives ===
Parquet was signed by the Las Vegas Locomotives of the United Football League on September 26, 2009.

=== Edmonton Eskimos ===
Parquet signed with the Edmonton Eskimos on April 20, 2010.

=== Later life ===
Parquet retired from professional football in July 2011 due to complications from head injuries suffered throughout his career.
