= Danny Baugher =

American football player (born 1984)

No. 8
- Position: Punter

Personal information
- Born: January 24, 1984 (age 42); Newton, New Jersey, U.S.
- Listed height: 5 ft 10 in (1.78 m)
- Listed weight: 194 lb (88 kg)

Career information
- High school: Phoenix (AZ) Mountain Pointe
- College: Arizona
- NFL draft: 2006: undrafted

Career history
- Cincinnati Bengals (2006)*; New England Patriots (2006–2007)*; Rhein Fire (2007); Cincinnati Bengals (2008)*; Denver Broncos (2008)*; Las Vegas Locomotives (2009–2012); Atlanta Falcons (2009)*; Oakland Raiders (2010)*
- * Offseason or practice squad member only

Awards and highlights
- 2× UFL champion (2009, 2010); All-NFL Europa (2007); Third-team All-American (2005); Second-team All-Pac-10 (2005)

Career UFL statistics
- Punting yards: 1,301
- Punting average: 43.4
- Inside 20: 9

Erle Daniel Baugher, IV /ˈbɒɡər/ (born January 24, 1984) is an American former professional football player who was a punter in the National Football League (NFL). He played college football for the Arizona Wildcats before being signed by the Cincinnati Bengals as an undrafted free agent in 2006.

Baugher was also a member of the New England Patriots, Rhein Fire, Denver Broncos, Las Vegas Locomotives, Atlanta Falcons and Oakland Raiders.

== College career ==
Baugher attended the University of Arizona, where he was a finalist for the Ray Guy Award in 2005.

== Professional career ==
=== Cincinnati Bengals ===
Baugher was signed as an undrafted free agent after the 2006 NFL draft by the Cincinnati Bengals, but was released at the start of training camp.

=== New England Patriots/Rhein Fire ===
On October 10, 2006, he was signed to the Patriots' practice squad but was released on August 29, 2007. He played for the Rhein Fire during the 2007 season and was named to the All-League team.

=== Second stint with Bengals ===
Baugher was signed a second time by the Bengals on February 5, 2008 and released on April 5, 2008.

=== Denver Broncos ===
Baugher was then signed by the Denver Broncos as a free agent on April 5, 2008 and released June 13, 2008. On December 2, 2008, Baugher worked out for the Green Bay Packers but was not signed.

=== Las Vegas Locomotives ===
Baugher was selected by the Las Vegas Locomotives in the UFL Premiere Season Draft and signed with the team on August 31, 2009. He played for the team from 2009 to 2012.

=== Atlanta Falcons ===
Baugher was signed to the practice squad of the Atlanta Falcons on January 1, 2010.

=== Oakland Raiders ===
Baugher was signed by the Oakland Raiders on December 21, 2010 to their practice squad as a potential backup to Shane Lechler. He was released on December 28.

== Personal life ==
His grandfather Erle Baugher played one season in the American Association/American Football League for the Wilmington Clippers during 1948.
