= Scott McCready =

British gridiron football player (born 1977)

Profile
- Position: Wide receiver

Personal information
- Born: 1 February 1977 (age 49); London, England
- Listed height: 6 ft 2 in (1.88 m)
- Listed weight: 210 lb (95 kg)

Career information
- College: South Florida
- NFL draft: 2001: undrafted

Career history
- New England Patriots (2001–2003); Scottish Claymores (2002–2004); Hamburg Sea Devils (2005–2007); Carolina Panthers (2004)*; Kansas City Chiefs (2006)
- * Offseason or practice squad member only

Awards and highlights
- Super Bowl champion (XXXVI)

Scott McCready (born February 1, 1977) is a British former professional football wide receiver. Previously he played for the Scottish Claymores from 2002 to 2004, and was named to the All-League team on multiple occasions.

McCready was the first British national to win the Super Bowl, which he did as a member of the New England Patriots practice squad in 2001. His team won Super Bowl XXXVI. McCready's father was a Royal Air Force pilot; after football, McCready became a pilot for Etihad Airways.
