= Shawn Mayer =

American football player and coach (born 1979)

Profile
- Position: DB

Personal information
- Born: March 4, 1979 (age 47); Hillsborough Township, New Jersey, U.S.
- Listed height: 6 ft 0 in (1.83 m)
- Listed weight: 202 lb (92 kg)

Career information
- College: Penn State

Career history
- 2003–2004: New England Patriots
- 2005: Atlanta Falcons*
- 2006: Cleveland Browns
- 2005-2007: Hamburg Sea Devils
- * Offseason or practice squad member only

Awards and highlights
- Second-team All-Big Ten (2002)
- Stats at Pro Football Reference

Shawn A. Mayer (born March 4, 1979) is an American former professional football defensive back, and currently a player development coach at Rutgers University.

Originally signed as an undrafted free agent by the New England Patriots in 2003, Mayer played in 9 games that season, compiling 15 tackles, including one in Super Bowl XXXVIII. That one Super Bowl tackle remarkably was of Carolina Panthers wide receiver Ricky Proehl, who attended the same Hillsborough High School as Mayer. He would appear in only 3 games in 2004, and in February 2005 he signed as a free agent with the Atlanta Falcons who then allocated him to NFL Europe. Mayer excelled as a member of the Hamburg Sea Devils, matching the NFL Europe record for interceptions in a game (3), setting team records for interceptions in a season (5) and in a game (3) and earning All-NFL Europe honors. He would return to play for Hamburg during the 2006 season, this time allocated by the Cleveland Browns.

Mayer started 23 games while at Penn State University and finished his career with 252 tackles, 5 interceptions, 1.5 sacks and 8 tackles for loss. He earned a Bachelor of Science in Administration of Justice from Penn State University in 2003.

He grew up in Hillsborough Township, New Jersey and was twice-named a USA Today All-American and New Jersey SuperPrep following his junior and senior seasons at Hillsborough High School where he also excelled in track and field.
