= Rich Parson =

American football player (born 1980)

No. 4, 14
- Position: Wide receiver

Personal information
- Born: May 16, 1980 (age 46); Newark, Delaware, U.S.

Career information
- High school: Newark
- College: Maryland

Career history
- 2005: Washington Redskins
- 2006–2007: Oakland Raiders
- Stats at Pro Football Reference

Richard Parson (born May 16, 1980) is an American former professional football player who was a wide receiver in the National Football League (NFL). He played college football for the Maryland Terrapins. His community involvement includes the University of Maryland. He continues to work with the School of Public Health and with the Alumni Association.
