= Pete McMahon =

American football player (born 1981)

No. 64, 68
- Position: Offensive tackle

Personal information
- Born: October 15, 1981 (age 45); Dubuque, Iowa, U.S.
- Listed height: 6 ft 8 in (2.03 m)
- Listed weight: 330 lb (150 kg)

Career information
- High school: Dubuque (IA) Wahlert Catholic
- College: Iowa
- NFL draft: 2005: 6th round, 214th overall pick

Career history
- Oakland Raiders (2005)*; Cleveland Browns (2005–2006)*; New York Jets (2006)*; Jacksonville Jaguars (2006-2007)*; Hamburg Sea Devils (2007); Chicago Rush (2007)*; New York Dragons (2008)*; Jacksonville Jaguars (2008)*; New England Patriots (2008)*; Jacksonville Jaguars (2008)*
- * Offseason or practice squad member only

Pete McMahon (born October 15, 1981) is an American former professional football offensive tackle. He was selected by the Oakland Raiders in the sixth round of the 2005 NFL draft. He played college football at Iowa.

McMahon was also a member of the Cleveland Browns, New York Jets, Hamburg Sea Devils, Jacksonville Jaguars, Chicago Rush, New York Dragons and New England Patriots.

== Early life ==
McMahon attended Wahlert High School in Dubuque, Iowa, where he played football as an offensive and defensive lineman.

== College career ==
McMahon played at the University of Iowa as a walk-on offensive lineman from 2000 through 2004.

== Professional career ==
=== Oakland Raiders ===
McMahon was selected by the Raiders in the sixth round of the 2005 NFL draft. He suffered a knee injury in the team's 2005 training camp and was waived/injured on August 29, 2005, cleared waivers, and was placed on injured reserve on September 1, 2005. He was then released from the injured reserve with an injury settlement the same day.

=== Cleveland Browns ===
On September 5, 2005, McMahon was signed to the Browns' practice squad, where he stayed through the 2005 season. He was re-signed to a future contract on January 2, 2006, but was waived on July 21, 2006.

=== New York Jets ===
McMahon was signed by the Jets on July 27, 2006, and waived on August 27, 2006.

=== Jacksonville Jaguars (first stint) ===
The Jaguars signed McMahon to their practice squad on December 12, 2006. He was re-signed to a future contract on January 2, 2007 and assigned to NFL Europa as a member of the Hamburg Sea Devils for their 2007 season. He was waived by the Jaguars on September 1, 2007.

=== New York Dragons ===
McMahon was signed by the New York Dragons of the Arena Football League on December 21, 2007 and waived on January 14, 2008.

=== Jacksonville Jaguars (second stint) ===
McMahon was signed to a future contract by the Jaguars on January 22, 2008, but was waived by the team on July 25, 2008.

=== New England Patriots ===
McMahon was signed by the Patriots on July 30, 2008, but was waived on August 13, 2008.

=== Jacksonville Jaguars (third stint) ===
On August 14, 2008, the Jaguars signed McMahon once again. He was waived by the team on August 30, 2008.
