= Vince Martino =

American football coach (born 1947)

Biographical details
- Born: March 19, 1947 (age 79); Schenectady, New York, U.S.
- Education: New Hampshire

Playing career
- 1966–1968: New Hampshire Wildcats
- Position: Defensive lineman

Coaching career (HC unless noted)
- 1991–1997: Barcelona Dragons (OL)
- 1998–2003: Barcelona Dragons (OC/OL)
- 2004: Scottish Claymores (OC/OL)
- 2005–2006: Hamburg Sea Devils (OC/OL)
- 2007: Hamburg Sea Devils
- 2008: Montreal Alouettes (OL)

Head coaching record
- Overall: 8–3 (NFLE)
- Bowls: 1–0 (NFLE)

Accomplishments and honors

Championships
- 1 World Bowl (2007)

Awards
- First team All-Yankee (1967); NFLE Coach of the Year (2007)

Vince Martino (born March 19, 1947) is an American football coach. He spent fifteen seasons in NFL Europe, including a stint as head coach of the Hamburg Sea Devils. Martino served as offensive line coach for the Montreal Alouettes of the Canadian Football League in 2008.

== Coaching career ==
Martino was the head coach in NFL Europe for the Hamburg Sea Devils. He took over from Coach Jack Bicknell prior to the 2007 season, after Bicknell retired due to health reason. He guided the Sea Devils to a 7–3 record and a World Bowl Championship, defeating the Frankfurt Galaxy 38–27 in World Bowl XV.
