= Hamburg Sea Devils (NFL Europe) =

NFL Europe American football team

Logo

General information
- Founded: 2005
- Folded: 2007
- Stadium: Volksparkstadion
- Headquartered: Hamburg, Germany
- Colors: Dark Blue, Teal, White, Red

League / conference affiliations
- NFL Europe

Championships
- World Bowls: 1 World Bowl XV (2007)

The Hamburg Sea Devils were an American football team that played in NFL Europe from 2005 to 2007. They played their home games at Hamburg's Volksparkstadion (also home to the German association football team Hamburger SV).

The franchise played its first game on 2 April 2005, losing 24–23 to the Cologne Centurions. The Sea Devils' first win came in Week 3 of the 2005 season, with a 31–24 home victory over the then-struggling Rhein Fire.

Their initial head coach was Jack Bicknell, previously head coach of the defunct Barcelona Dragons and Scottish Claymores. The Sea Devils had directly replaced the Claymores after the 2004 season.

On 1 April 2006, the Sea Devils recorded their first tie in franchise history. At home, they scored 17 points in the second quarter, against the Berlin Thunder. They had blown their 17-point lead before regulation ended. When no one scored in overtime, the game ended in a draw. This was only the second tie in the NFL Europa history. The previous tie came in the 1992 season between the Rhein Fire and the London Monarchs.

On 29 March 2007, Bicknell resigned, citing health issues as the reason. He was replaced by offensive coordinator Vince Martino.

On 23 June 2007, the Sea Devils won their first World Bowl championship with a 37–28 victory over the defending champion Frankfurt Galaxy. It was also their last, as NFL Europa disbanded almost immediately following the game. As a result, the Sea Devils are the last team to win a WLAF/NFL Europe/NFL Europa game ever.

Previously, Thomas Herrion, an offensive tackle allocated to the team by the San Francisco 49ers, died after a preseason game against the Denver Broncos in August 2005.

An unrelated team of the same name has played since 2021 in the new European League of Football.

== Notable players ==
- Tom Arth, quarterback coach of the Pittsburgh Steelers since 2024
- Ryan Dinwiddie, quarterback and head coach of the Ottawa Redblacks since 2026
- Brent Grimes, a four-time Pro Bowl cornerback who played for the Atlanta Falcons, Miami Dolphins, and Tampa Bay Buccaneers
- Thomas Herrion, an offensive tackle allocated to the team by the San Francisco 49ers, who died after an NFL preseason game
- Mike Jemison, a running back who was arrested in relation to a home invasion robbery in 2007
- Antonio Smith, a Pro Bowl defensive end and Super Bowl 50 champion with the Denver Broncos who played for four NFL franchises

== Season-by-season ==
=== NFL Europe ===
Season	League	Regular season					Postseason			
Season	League	Won	Lost	Ties	Win %	Finish	Won	Lost	Win %	Result
2005	NFLE	5	5	0	.500	4th (League)	–	–	—	—
2006	NFLE	3	6	1	.350	5th (League)	–	–	—	—
2007	NFLE	7	3	0	.700	1st (League)	1	0	1.000	World Bowl XV champions
Total		15	14	1	.517		1	0	1.000	

== Head coaches ==
#	Name	Term	Regular season					Postseason				Achievements
#	Name	Term	GC	Won	Lost	Ties	Win %	GC	Won	Lost	Win %	Achievements
1	Jack Bicknell	2005–2006	20	8	11	1	.425	–	–	–	—	—
2	Vince Martino	2007	10	7	3	0	.700	1	1	0	1.000	World Bowl XV championship NFL Europe Coach of the Year (2007)

== Gallery ==
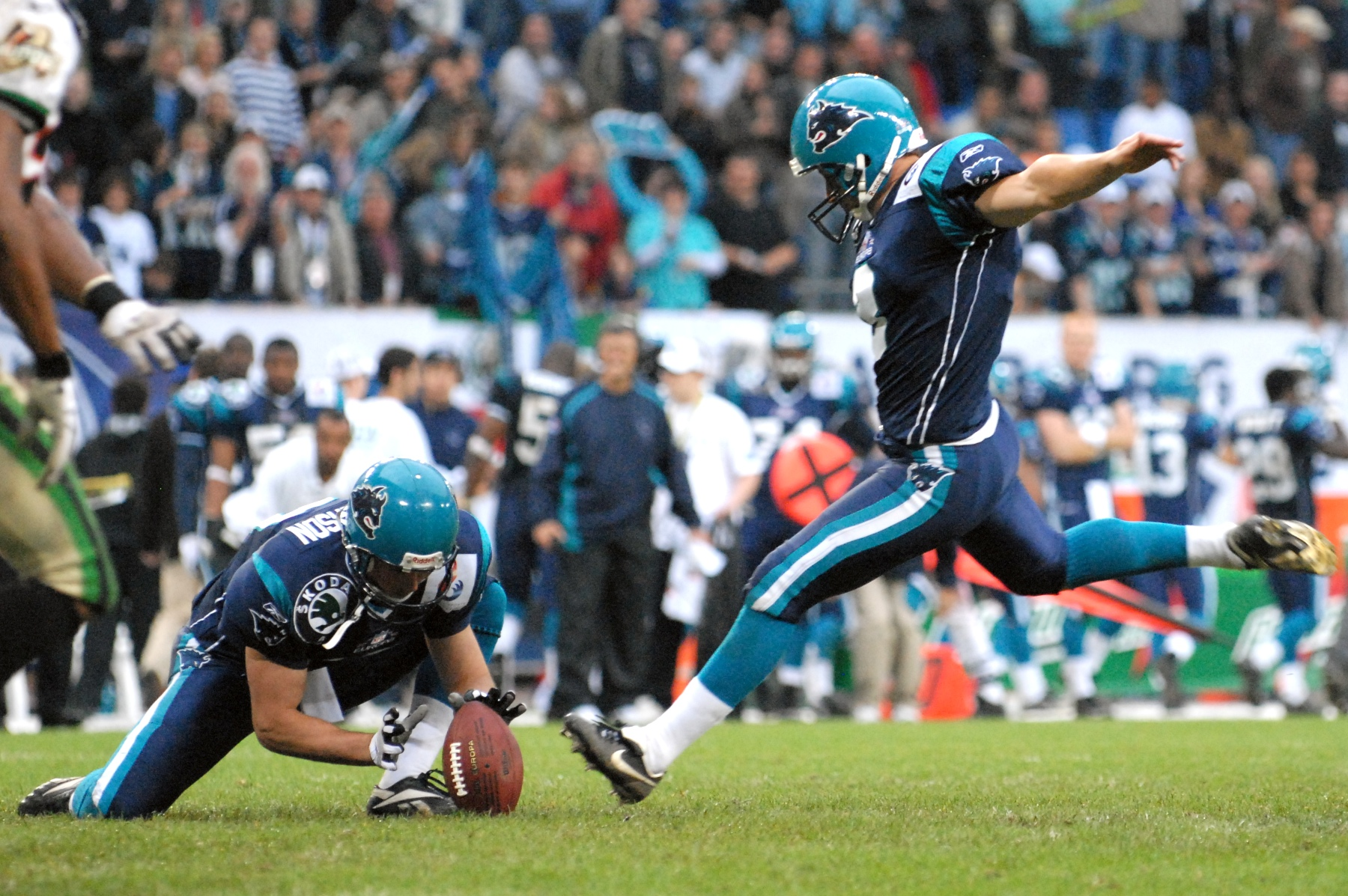
The Sea Devils try a kick in the 2007 season

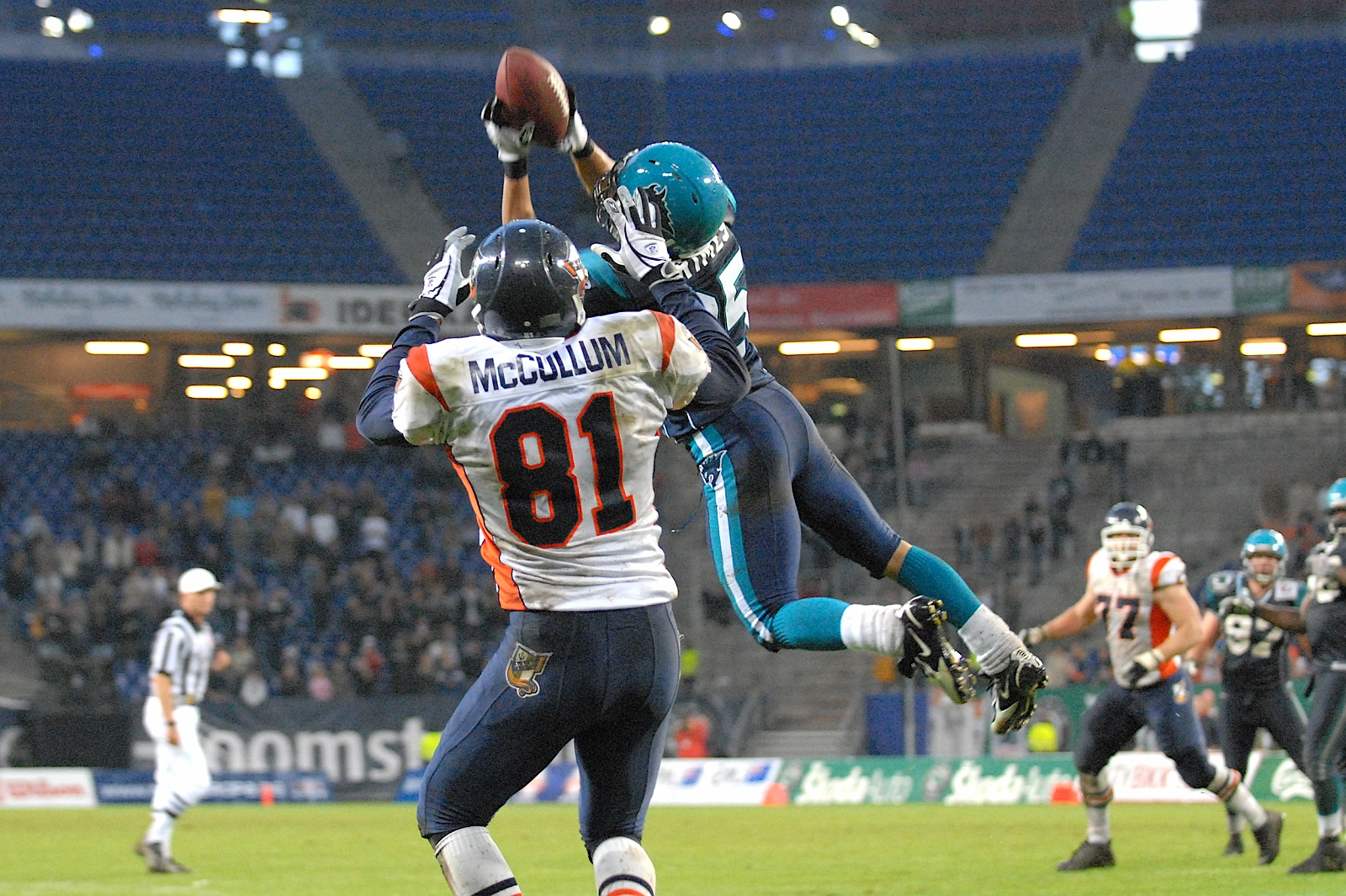
Brent Grimes makes an interception catch against Amsterdam, 2007

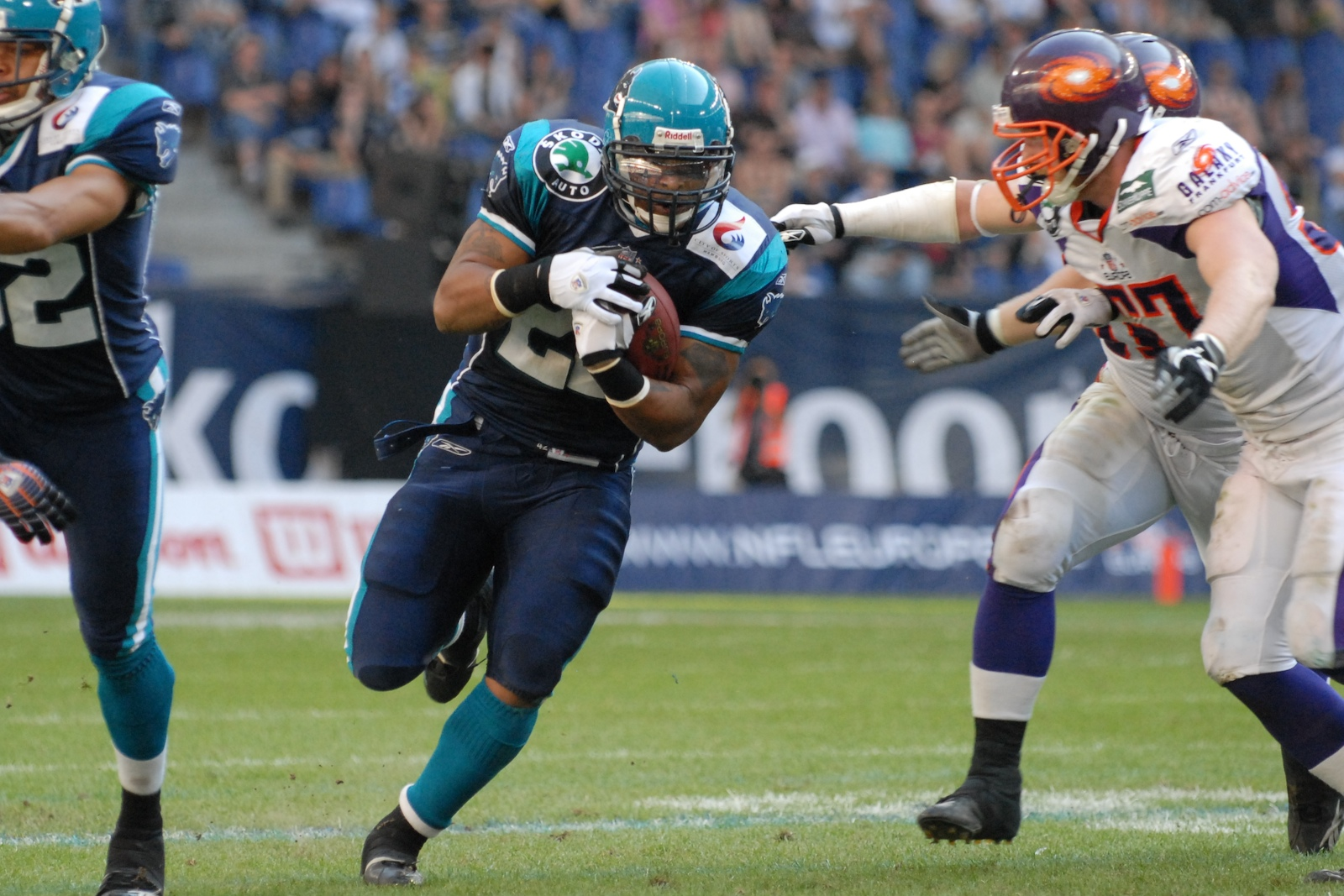
Hamburg on offense against the Frankfurt Galaxy, 2007

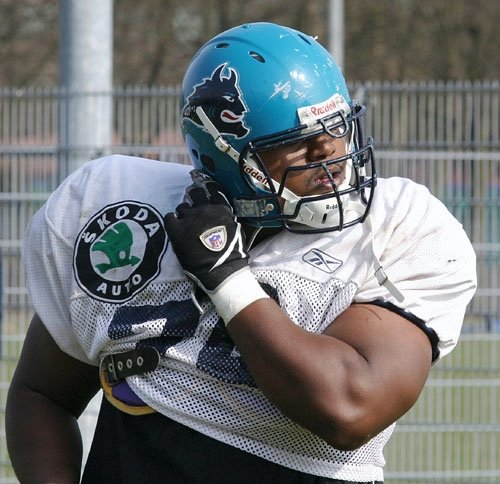
Sea Devils offensive lineman Brandon Newton

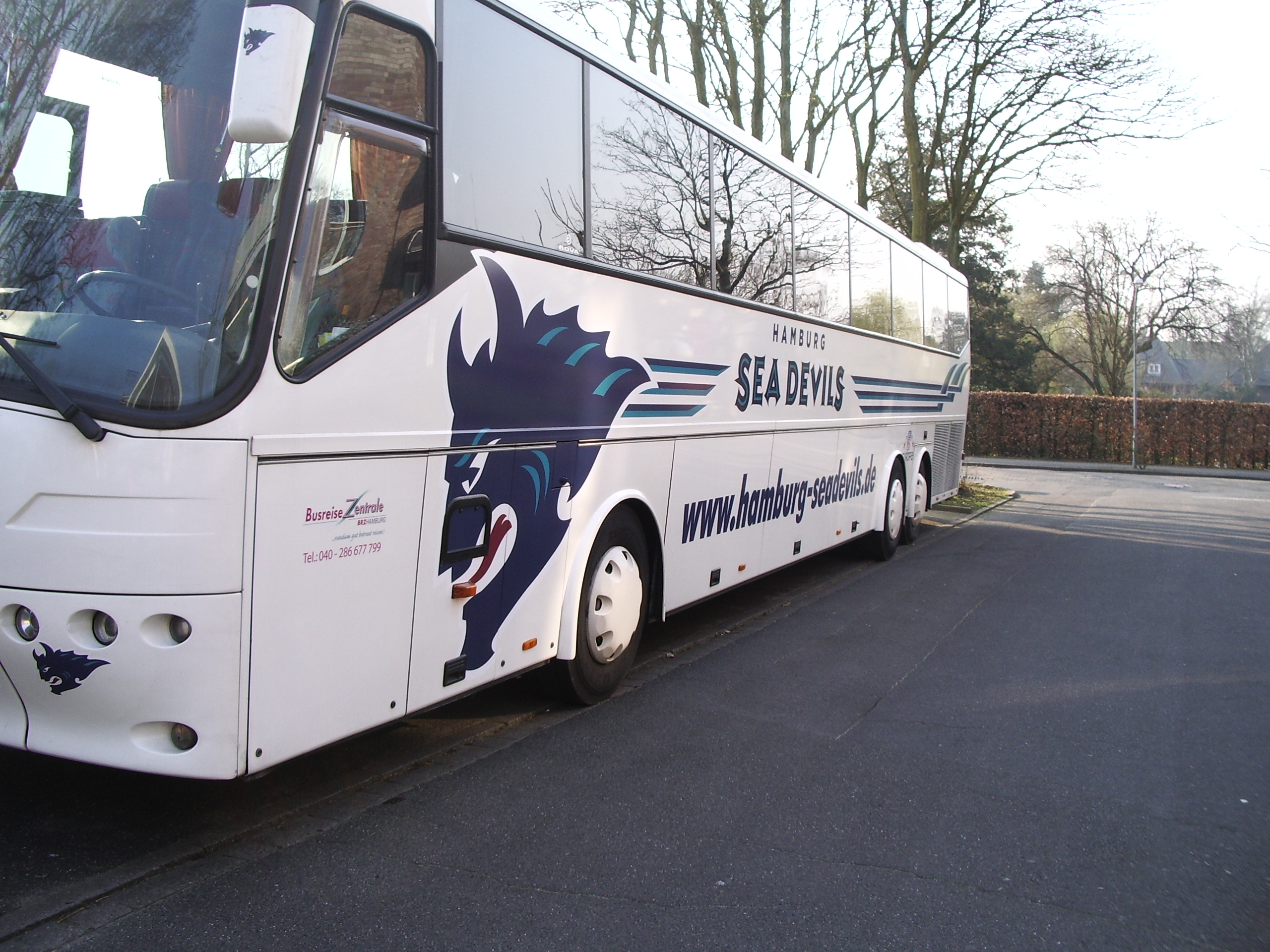
Sea Devil logo on the side of a coach
