= 2007 Frankfurt Galaxy season =

NFL Europa team season

- General manager: Tilman Engel
- Head coach: Mike Jones
- Home stadium: Commerzbank-Arena

Results
- Record: 7–3
- Division place: 2nd
- Playoffs: Lost World Bowl XV

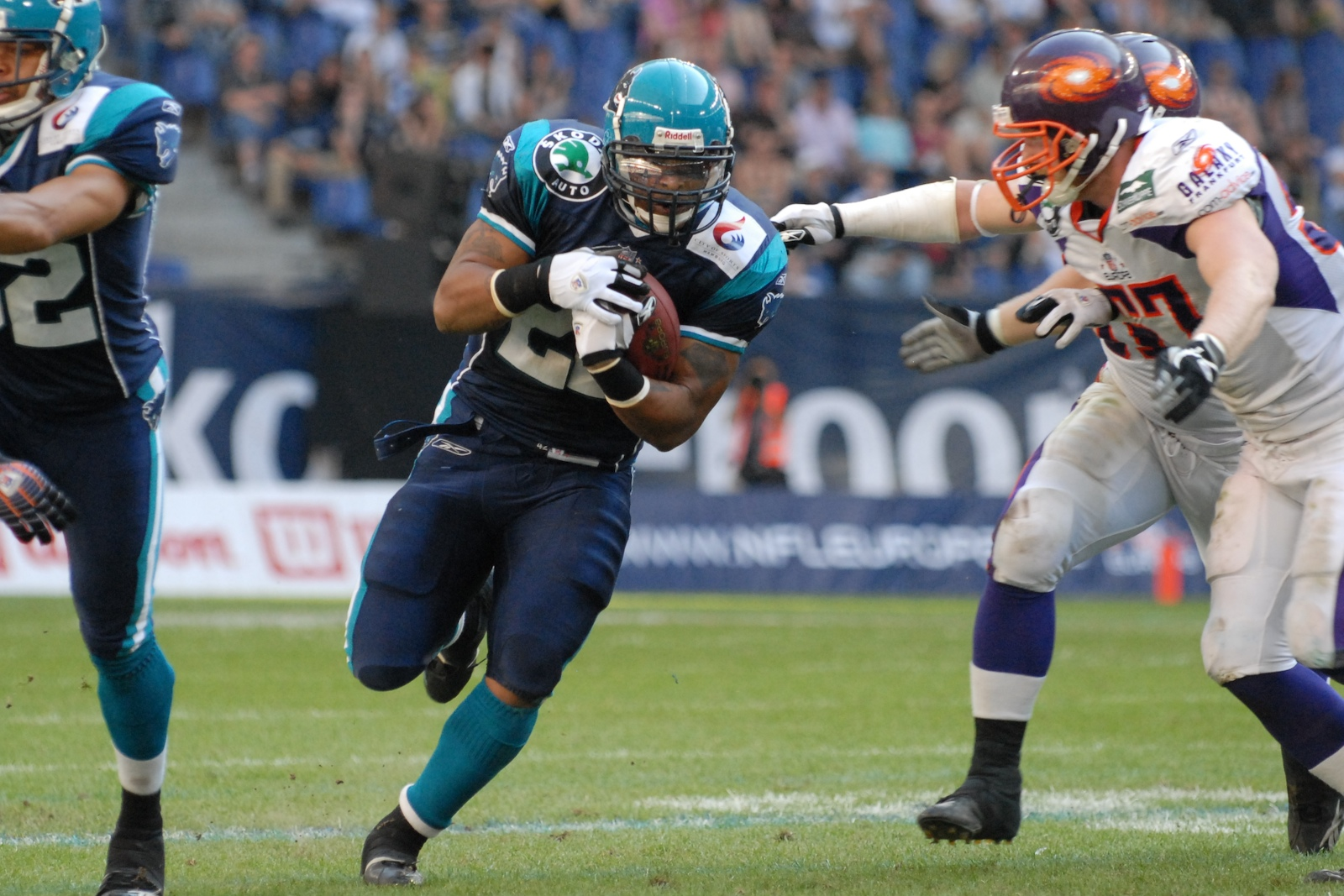
Frankfurt at Hamburg, June 9, 2007

The 2007 Frankfurt Galaxy season was the 15th and final season for the franchise in the NFL Europa League (NFLEL). The team was led by head coach Mike Jones in his fourth year, and played its home games at Commerzbank-Arena in Frankfurt, Germany. They finished the regular season in second place with a record of seven wins and three losses. In World Bowl XV, Frankfurt lost to the Hamburg Sea Devils 37–28. The National Football League (NFL) announced the closure of its European branch on June 29.

== Offseason ==
=== Free agent draft ===
2007 Frankfurt Galaxy NFLEL free agent draft selections
Draft order		Player name	Position	College
Round	Choice	Player name	Position	College
1	6	Zac Woodfin	LB	UAB
2	12	Edorian McCullough	CB	Texas
3	13	David Jones	TE	LSU
4	24	Craig Bailey	LB	Nevada
5	25	Ben Sobieski	G	Iowa
6	36	Brandon Middleton	WR	Houston
7	37	Bobby Harris	T	Mississippi
8	48	Robert Ortiz	WR	San Diego State
9	49	Kyle Killion	LB	Indiana
10	60	Josh Sewell	C	Nebraska
11	61	Billy Alford	CB	Vanderbilt
12	72	Justin Brown	DE	East Central (OK)
13	73	Charles Missant	C	Western Michigan
14	84	Matt Sinclair	LB	Illinois
15	85	Charles Anthony	RB	Tennessee State
16	96	Ron Rockett	S	Wyoming
17	97	Raymond Washington	CB	Fresno State
18	108	Chris Laskowski	S	Florida Atlantic
19	109	Kellen Pruitt	LB	Syracuse
20	120	Roscoe Crosby	WR	Clemson
21	121	Felton Huggins	WR	Southeastern Louisiana

== Personnel ==
=== Staff ===
2007 Frankfurt Galaxy (NFL Europe) staff
Front office: General manager – Tilman Engel; Head coaches: Head coach/wide receivers – Mike Jones; Offensive coaches: Offensive coordinator/offensive line – Whitey Jordan; Quarterbacks – Biff Parson; National coach/running backs – Markus Grahn; Tight ends – Dwayne Ledford	Defensive coaches: Defensive coordinator/linebackers – Steve Carson; Defensive line – Cornell Brown; Defensive backs – Ken Stills; Assistant defensive backs – Andre Lott; Special teams coaches: National coach/special teams coordinator – Markus Grahn; Special teams assistant – Ken Stills; Strength and conditioning: Strength and conditioning – Adam Baucher

=== Roster ===
2007 Frankfurt Galaxy final roster
Quarterbacks: 9 Kevin Eakin; 4 J. T. O'Sullivan; Running backs: 30 DeCori Birmingham; 21 Sha-Ron Edwards; 33 J. R. Niklos; 28 Anthony Sherrell (IR); Wide receivers: 89 Aaron Hosack; 15 Felton Huggins; 17 Jermaine Jamison; 87 Brandon Middleton; 80 Robert Ortiz; 85 Rashaun Woods; Tight ends: 84 T. J. Cottrell; 82 David Jones (IR); 88 Jamie Petrowski	Offensive linemen: 78 Ben Brielmaier T; 76 Bobby Harris T; 68 Kevin McAlmont G; 60 Matt McChesney G; 69 Charles Missant C; 72 Jason Murphy T; 71 Doug Nienhuis T (IR); 79 Josh Sewell G/C; Defensive linemen: 93 Remi Ayodele DT; 91 Justin Brown DE; 94 Steve Fifita DT; 97 Zarnell Fitch DT; 99 Kenny King DE (IR); 98 John Syptak DE; 92 Maurice White DE	Linebackers: 50 Jim Cottrell OLB (IR); 55 Kyle Killion OLB; 57 Nick Reid OLB; 56 Dominique Sims OLB; 44 Matt Sinclair MLB; 58 Zac Woodfin OLB; Defensive backs: 31 Billy Alford CB; 26 Edward Kwaku CB; 39 Jamar Landrom FS; 40 Chris Laskowski SS/FS; 23 Edorian McCullough CB; 27 Shirdonya Mitchell CB; 25 Ron Rockett SS (IR); 42 DeMario Williams SS; Special teams: 8 Kyle Basler P; 7 Rhys Lloyd K	National players: 70 (England) Emmanuel Akah G; 75 (Germany) Kevin Ansu-Yeboah G; 90 (Germany) Daniel Benetka DT; 35 (Germany) Leonard Greene FS; 51 (Japan) Rikiya Ishida MLB; 20 (Germany) Martin Latka RB; 81 (Japan) Yuji Ohtaki WR; 83 (Germany) Florian Pawlik TE; 95 (Germany) Ulrich Winkler DE; Rookies in italics

== Schedule ==
Week	Date	Opponent	Result	Record	Venue	Attendance	Recap
1	April 14	Amsterdam Admirals	W 30–14	1–0	Commerzbank-Arena	38,125	Recap
2	April 21	at Cologne Centurions	W 18–13	2–0	RheinEnergieStadion	16,422	Recap
3	April 28	Hamburg Sea Devils	W 20–17	3–0	Commerzbank-Arena	29,091	Recap
4	May 6	at Amsterdam Admirals	L 17–19	3–1	Amsterdam Arena	10,788	Recap
5	May 12	at Rhein Fire	L 24–27	3–2	LTU arena	27,349	Recap
6	May 20	Berlin Thunder	W 35–7	4–2	Commerzbank-Arena	30,125	Recap
7	May 26	Rhein Fire	W 23–10	5–2	Commerzbank-Arena	32,789	Recap
8	June 2	at Berlin Thunder	W 25–22	6–2	Olympiastadion	11,882	Recap
9	June 9	at Hamburg Sea Devils	L 31–36	6–3	AOL Arena	30,528	Recap
10	June 16	Cologne Centurions	W 31–14	7–3	Commerzbank-Arena	35,087	Recap
Postseason	June 23	Hamburg Sea Devils	L 28–37	0–1	Commerzbank-Arena	48,125	Recap

== Standings ==
NFL Europa League
Team	W	L	T	PCT	PF	PA	Home	Road	STK
Hamburg Sea Devils	7	3	0	.700	231	176	4–1	3–2	W4
Frankfurt Galaxy	7	3	0	.700	254	179	5–0	2–3	W1
Cologne Centurions	6	4	0	.600	205	172	2–3	4–1	L1
Rhein Fire	4	6	0	.400	166	212	2–3	2–3	L1
Amsterdam Admirals	4	6	0	.400	194	250	3–2	1–4	W1
Berlin Thunder	2	8	0	.200	146	207	0–5	2–3	L6

== Game summaries ==
=== Week 1: vs Amsterdam Admirals ===
Week One: Amsterdam Admirals at Frankfurt Galaxy – Game summary

Quarter	1	2	3	4	Total
Amsterdam	8	6	0	0	14
Frankfurt	7	10	13	0	30

at Commerzbank-Arena, Frankfurt, Germany

- Date: Saturday, April 14
- Game time: 7:10 p.m. CEST
- Game attendance: 38,125
- Referee: Don Carey

=== Week 2: at Cologne Centurions ===
Week Two: Frankfurt Galaxy at Cologne Centurions – Game summary

Quarter	1	2	3	4	Total
Frankfurt	7	4	7	0	18
Cologne	7	3	0	3	13

at RheinEnergieStadion, Cologne, Germany

- Date: Saturday, April 21
- Game time: 6:00 p.m.
- Game attendance: 16,422

=== Week 3: vs Hamburg Sea Devils ===
Week Three: Hamburg Sea Devils at Frankfurt Galaxy – Game summary

Quarter	1	2	3	4	Total
Hamburg	0	0	6	11	17
Frankfurt	7	3	0	10	20

at Commerzbank-Arena, Frankfurt, Germany

- Date: Saturday, April 28
- Game time: 7:00 p.m. CEST
- Game attendance: 29,091

=== Week 4: at Amsterdam Admirals ===
Week Four: Frankfurt Galaxy at Amsterdam Admirals – Game summary

Quarter	1	2	3	4	Total
Frankfurt	0	0	14	3	17
Amsterdam	7	12	0	0	19

at Amsterdam ArenA, Amsterdam, Netherlands

- Date: Sunday, May 6
- Game time: 3:05 p.m. CEST
- Game attendance: 10,788
- Referee: Tom Symonette

=== Week 5: at Rhein Fire ===
Week Five: Frankfurt Galaxy at Rhein Fire – Game summary

Quarter	1	2	3	4	Total
Rhein	7	0	7	13	27
Frankfurt	7	7	3	7	24

at LTU arena, Düsseldorf, Germany

- Date: Saturday, May 12
- Game time: 7:00 p.m. CEST
- Game attendance: 27,349

=== Week 6: vs Berlin Thunder ===
Week Six: Berlin Thunder at Frankfurt Galaxy – Game summary

Quarter	1	2	3	4	Total
Berlin	0	7	0	0	7
Frankfurt	14	14	7	0	35

at Commerzbank-Arena, Frankfurt, Germany

- Date: Sunday, May 20
- Game time: 5:00 p.m. CEST
- Game attendance: 30,125

=== Week 7: vs Rhein Fire ===
Week Seven: Rhein Fire at Frankfurt Galaxy – Game summary

Quarter	1	2	3	4	Total
Rhein	0	10	0	0	10
Frankfurt	3	3	7	10	23

at Commerzbank-Arena, Frankfurt, Germany

- Date: Saturday, May 26
- Game time: 7:00 p.m. CEST
- Game attendance: 32,789

=== Week 8: at Berlin Thunder ===
Week Eight: Frankfurt Galaxy at Berlin Thunder – Game summary

Quarter	1	2	3	4	Total
Frankfurt	3	0	0	22	25
Berlin	7	0	8	7	22

at Olympic Stadium, Berlin, Germany

- Date: Saturday, June 2
- Game time: 6:00 p.m.
- Game attendance: 11,882

=== Week 9: at Hamburg Sea Devils ===
Week Nine: Frankfurt Galaxy at Hamburg Sea Devils – Game summary

Quarter	1	2	3	4	Total
Frankfurt	14	7	3	7	31
Hamburg	10	14	3	9	36

at AOL Arena, Hamburg, Germany

- Date: Saturday, June 9
- Game time: 6:00 p.m. CEST
- Game attendance: 30,528

=== Week 10: vs Cologne Centurions ===
Week Ten: Cologne Centurions at Frankfurt Galaxy – Game summary

Quarter	1	2	3	4	Total
Cologne	0	0	7	7	14
Frankfurt	3	10	14	4	31

at Commerzbank-Arena, Frankfurt, Germany

- Date: Saturday, June 16
- Game time: 7:00 p.m. CEST
- Game attendance: 35,087

=== World Bowl XV ===
World Bowl XV: Hamburg Sea Devils vs Frankfurt Galaxy – Game summary

Quarter	1	2	3	4	Total
Hamburg	13	10	7	7	37
Frankfurt	0	14	14	0	28

at Commerzbank-Arena, Frankfurt, Germany

- Date: Saturday, June 23
- Game time: 7:10 p.m. CEST
- Game weather: 70 °F (21.1 °C)
- Game attendance: 48,125
- Referee: John Parry
- TV announcers (NFL Network): Bob Papa and Brian Baldinger

== Honors ==
After the completion of the regular season, the All-NFL Europa League team was selected by the NFLEL coaching staffs, members of a media panel and fans voting online at NFLEurope.com. Overall, Frankfurt had seven players selected. The selections were:

- Bobby Harris, offensive tackle
- Rhys Lloyd, placekicker
- Matt McChesney, guard
- Brandon Middleton, wide receiver
- Shirdonya Mitchell, cornerback
- J. T. O'Sullivan, quarterback
- Matt Sinclair, linebacker

Additionally, O'Sullivan was named offensive co-MVP alongside running back Derrick Ross of the Cologne Centurions. O'Sullivan started all ten games and led the league in passer rating (104.8), and passing yards (2,201) while tying for the lead with 16 touchdown passes. He completed 174 of 254 passes with seven interceptions and also rushed 31 times for 110 yards and two touchdowns.
