= 1991 Cincinnati Bengals season =

NFL team season

- Owner: Mike Brown
- Head coach: Sam Wyche
- Home stadium: Riverfront Stadium

Results
- Record: 3–13
- Division place: 4th AFC Central
- Playoffs: Did not qualify
- Pro Bowlers: T Anthony Muñoz

The 1991 Cincinnati Bengals season was the team's 24th year in professional football and its 22nd with the National Football League (NFL). Prior to the start of the season, the Bengals lost their patriarch when founder, former head coach and general manager Paul Brown died at the age of 82. His son Mike would assume control of the franchise. The Bengals would stumble out the gate losing their first eight games before defeating the Cleveland Browns 23–21 at Riverfront Stadium. The Bengals would only win two more games the rest of the season finishing with a 3–13 record.

The Bengals' pass defense would surrender 7.586 yards per pass attempt in 1991, one of the ten worst totals in NFL history.

Following the season head coach Sam Wyche was fired and replaced by assistant Dave Shula. Shula, the son of former Miami Dolphins and Baltimore Colts head coach Don Shula, served as the team’s wide receivers coach after a stint with the Miami Dolphins under his father, and the Dallas Cowboys as its offensive coordinator and wide receivers coach under head coach Jimmy Johnson. Upon his hiring as the Bengals’ head coach, he became the youngest head coach to ever be hired by an NFL team at age 32.

== Offseason ==
=== NFL draft ===
1991 Cincinnati Bengals draft
Round	Pick	Player	Position	College	Notes
1	18	Alfred Williams *	Linebacker	Colorado	
2	52	Lamar Rogers	Defensive end	Auburn	
3	72	Bob Dahl	Guard	Notre Dame	
4	99	Donald Hollas	Quarterback	Rice	
4	109	Rob Carpenter	Wide receiver	Syracuse	
5	130	Mike Arthur	Center	Texas A&M	
6	157	Richard Fain	Cornerback	Florida	
7	184	Fernandus Vinson	Safety	North Carolina State	
8	211	Mike Dingle	Running back	South Carolina	
9	241	Shane Garrett	Wide receiver	Texas A&M	
10	268	Jim Lavin	Guard	Georgia Tech	
11	295	Chris Smith	Tight end	Brigham Young	
12	322	Antoine Bennett	Cornerback	Florida A&M	
Made roster * Made at least one Pro Bowl during career

=== Undrafted free agents ===
1991 undrafted free agents of note
Player	Position	College
John Langeloh	Kicker	Michigan State
Ken McKay	Tight end	Louisville
Dave Senczyszyn	Tackle	Wisconsin
Chris Swartz	Quarterback	Morehead State

== Personnel ==
=== Staff ===
1991 Cincinnati Bengals staff
Front office: Chairman of the Board – Austin Eldon Knowlton; President – John Sawyer; Vice President/General Manager – Paul Brown; Assistant General Manager/Legal Counsel – Mike Brown; Director of Player Personnel – Pete Brown; Assistant Director of Player Personnel – Frank Smouse; Head coaches: Head Coach – Sam Wyche; Offensive coaches: Quarterbacks – Dana Bible; Running Backs – Jim Anderson; Wide Receivers – Dave Shula; Tight Ends – Mike Stock; Offensive Line – Jim McNally	Defensive coaches: Defensive Coordinator/Defensive Backs – Dick LeBeau; Defensive Line – Chuck Studley; Linebackers – Dick Selcer; Special teams coaches: Special Teams – Marv Braden; Strength and conditioning: Strength – Kim Wood

=== Roster ===
1991 Cincinnati Bengals roster
Quarterbacks (QB): 7 Boomer Esiason; 12 Donald Hollas; 4 Erik Wilhelm; Running backs (RB): 21 James Brooks KR; 38 Mike Dingle KR; 28 Harold Green; 20 Craig Taylor; 30 Ickey Woods; Wide receivers (WR): 86 Mike Barber PR; 81 Eddie Brown; 89 Shane Garrett KR; 85 Tim McGee; 88 Reggie Rembert; Tight ends (TE): 82 Rodney Holman; 84 Eric Kattus; 87 Jim Riggs	Offensive linemen (OL): 65 Mike Arthur C; 70 Scott Jones T; 64 Bruce Kozerski C; 73 Ken Moyer G; 76 Kirk Scrafford T; 71 Ralph Tamm G/C; 63 Joe Walter T; 60 Mike Withycombe T; Defensive linemen (DL): 69 Tim Krumrie NT; 99 Alonzo Mitz DE; 79 Lamar Rogers DE; 67 Danny Stubbs DE; 96 Natu Tuatagaloa	Linebackers (LB): 53 Leo Barker ILB; 57 Bernard Clark ILB; 50 James Francis OLB; 58 Alex Gordon OLB; 51 Leon White OLB; 94 Alfred Williams OLB; 91 Carl Zander ILB; Defensive backs (DB): 35 Antoine Bennett CB; 27 Barney Bussey FS; 29 Rickey Dixon FS; 33 David Fulcher SS; 45 Wayne Haddix CB; 32 Mitchell Price; 22 Eric Thomas CB; 34 Fernandus Vinson FS; Special teams (ST): 55 Ed Brady LS; 3 Jim Breech K; 11 Lee Johnson P	Practice squad: —- Sean Beckton; Reserve: 42 Eric Ball (IR); 24 Lewis Billups CB (IR); 98 David Grant DE (IR); 68 Paul Jetton G (IR); 25 Rod Jones CB (IR); -- Jim Lavin G (IR); 78 Anthony Muñoz T (IR); 75 Bruce Reimers G (IR); -- Andrew Stewart DT (IR); 59 Kevin Walker LB (IR); 47 active, 10 inactive Rookies in italics

== Preseason ==
Week	Date	Opponent	Result	Record	Venue	Attendance
1	August 2	at Detroit Lions	L 20–24	0–1	Pontiac Silverdome	47,899
2	August 10	Philadelphia Eagles	L 24–29	0–2	Riverfront Stadium	56,390
3	August 17	Minnesota Vikings	W 27–24 (OT)	1–2	Riverfront Stadium	56,358
4	August 24	at Green Bay Packers	W 19–16 (OT)	2–2	Lambeau Field	52,390

== Regular season ==
=== Schedule ===
Week	Date	Opponent	Result	Record	Venue	Attendance
1	September 1	at Denver Broncos	**L** 14–45	0–1	Mile High Stadium	72,855
2	September 8	**Houston Oilers**	**L** 7–30	0–2	Riverfront Stadium	56,463
3	September 15	at **Cleveland Browns**	**L** 13–14	0–3	Cleveland Municipal Stadium	78,269
4	September 22	Washington Redskins	**L** 27–34	0–4	Riverfront Stadium	52,038
5	Bye					
6	October 6	Seattle Seahawks	**L** 7–13	0–5	Riverfront Stadium	60,010
7	October 13	at Dallas Cowboys	**L** 23–35	0–6	Texas Stadium	63,275
8	October 21	at Buffalo Bills	**L** 16–35	0–7	Rich Stadium	80,131
9	October 27	at **Houston Oilers**	**L** 3–35	0–8	Houston Astrodome	58,634
10	November 3	**Cleveland Browns**	**W** 23–21	1–8	Riverfront Stadium	55,077
11	November 10	**Pittsburgh Steelers**	**L** 27–33(OT)	1–9	Riverfront Stadium	55,503
12	November 17	at Philadelphia Eagles	**L** 10–17	1–10	Veterans Stadium	63,189
13	November 24	Los Angeles Raiders	**L** 14–38	1–11	Riverfront Stadium	52,044
14	December 1	New York Giants	**W** 27–24	2–11	Riverfront Stadium	45,063
15	December 9	at Miami Dolphins	**L** 13–37	2–12	Joe Robbie Stadium	60,616
16	December 15	at **Pittsburgh Steelers**	**L** 10–17	2–13	Three Rivers Stadium	35,420
17	December 22	New England Patriots	**W** 29–7	3–13	Riverfront Stadium	46,394
Note: Intra-division opponents are in **bold** text.

=== Standings ===
AFC Central
	W	L	T	PCT	DIV	CONF	PF	PA	STK
^{(3)} Houston Oilers	11	5	0	.688	5–1	10–2	386	251	L1
Pittsburgh Steelers	7	9	0	.438	4–2	7–5	292	344	W2
Cleveland Browns	6	10	0	.375	2–4	6–6	293	298	L3
Cincinnati Bengals	3	13	0	.188	1–5	2–10	263	435	W1

=== Season summary ===
==== Week 16 at Steelers ====
Week Sixteen: Cincinnati Bengals (2–12) at Pittsburgh Steelers (5–9)

Quarter	1	2	3	4	Total
Bengals	0	7	3	0	**10**
**Steelers**	10	0	0	7	**17**

at Three Rivers Stadium, Pittsburgh, Pennsylvania

- Date: December 15
- Game time: 1:00 p.m. EDT
- Game weather: Mostly sunny, 31 °F (−1 °C)
- Game attendance: 35,420
- Referee: Gordon McCarter
- TV announcers (NBC): Don Criqui and Bob Trumpy
- Box Score

Game information

First quarter

- PIT – Adrian Cooper 47-yard pass from Bubby Brister (Gary Anderson kick), 12:59. Steelers 7–0.
- PIT – Gary Anderson 47-yard field goal, 3:48. Steelers 10–0.

Second quarter

- CIN – David Fulcher 27-yard interception return (Jim Breech kick), 14:00. Steelers 10–7.

Third quarter

- CIN – Jim Breech 39-yard field goal, 5:10. Tie 10–10.

Fourth quarter

- PIT – Keith Cash 19-yard pass from Bubby Brister (Gary Anderson kick), 14:55. Steelers 17–10.

Top passers

- CIN – Boomer Esiason – 14/26, 125 yards, 2 INT
- PIT – Bubby Brister – 15/28, 184 yards, 2 TD, 2 INT

Top rushers

- CIN – Harold Green – 18 rushes, 62 yards
- PIT – Merril Hoge – 16 rushes, 79 yards

Top receivers

- CIN – Eddie Brown – 5 receptions, 50 yards
- PIT – Keith Cash – 4 receptions, 55 yards, TD

== Team leaders ==
=== Passing ===
Player	Att	Comp	Yds	TD	INT	Rating
Boomer Esiason	413	233	2883	13	16	72.5

=== Rushing ===
Player	Att	Yds	YPC	Long	TD
Harold Green	158	731	4.6	75	2
Ickey Woods	36	97	2.7	12	4

=== Receiving ===
Player	Rec	Yds	Avg	Long	TD
Eddie Brown	59	837	14.0	53	2
Tim McGee	51	802	15.7	52	4

=== Defensive ===
Player	Tackles	Sacks	INTs	FF	FR
David Fulcher	95	0.0	4	4	3
Tim Krumrie	68	4.0	0	1	1

=== Kicking/Punting ===
Player	FGA	FGM	FG%	XPA	XPM	XP%	Points
Jim Breech	29	23	79.3%	27	27	100.0%	96

Player	Punts	Yards	Long	Blkd	Avg.
Lee Johnson	64	2795	62	0	43.7

=== Special teams ===
Player	KR	KRYards	KRAvg	KRLong	KRTD	PR	PRYards	PRAvg	PRLong	PRTD
Shane Garrett	13	214	16.5	24	0	1	7	7.0	7	0
Eric Ball	13	262	20.2	24	0	0	0	0	0	0
Mitchell Price	5	91	18.2	22	0	14	203	14.5	78	1
