= World Bowl XV =

NFL Europe's last championship game

Hamburg Sea Devils (1st)	Frankfurt Galaxy (2nd)
37	28
	1	2	3	4	Total
HAM	13	10	7	7	37
FRA	0	14	14	0	28
- Date: Saturday, June 23, 2007
- Stadium: Commerzbank-Arena, Frankfurt, Germany
- MVP: Casey Bramlet, Quarterback
- Referee: John Parry
- Attendance: 48,125

Ceremonies
- Halftime show: Meat Loaf

TV in the United States
- Network: NFL Network
- Announcers: Bob Papa and Brian Baldinger

World Bowl XV, officially known as Yello Strom World Bowl XV, was NFL Europa's 2007 championship game, and the final game in the league's history. It was played at Commerzbank-Arena in Frankfurt, Germany on Saturday, June 23, 2007. The defending World Bowl champion Frankfurt Galaxy (7–3) hosted the Hamburg Sea Devils (7–3) in their own home stadium.

The game marked the third time that Frankfurt hosted the World Bowl. They were the host of World Bowl '98 and of World Bowl 2000.

World Bowl XV was the only World Bowl under the new NFL Europa branding. It was also the first World Bowl appearance for the Sea Devils, while the Galaxy made their 8th appearance, extending the record they already held.

Meat Loaf and Neverland Express served as the game's pregame show performance. The United States Army Europe Band and Chorus from Heidelberg, Germany served as the game's half time show performance.

The Sea Devils won their first World Bowl championship with a 37–28 win, becoming the highest scoring World Bowl in league history (65 total points). QB Casey Bramlet took MVP honors by completing 20 out of 27 passes for 347 yards and he threw a World Bowl record 4 touchdown passes. 48,125 people were in attendance.

== Background ==
The Galaxy won the first meeting 20–17 in Frankfurt, while the Sea Devils took the second meeting 36–31 in Hamburg.

== Game summary ==
The Sea Devils drew first blood with QB Casey Bramlet completing a 3-yard TD pass to WR Justin Jenkins (followed with a failed PAT). Afterwards, Bramlet went right back to work with a 35-yard flea-flicker TD pass to WR Marcus Maxwell. In the second quarter, the Galaxy finally got going with QB J.T. O'Sullivan completing a 24-yard TD pass to WR Brandon Middleton, but Hamburg responded with RB Jermaine Allen getting a 33-yard TD run. Frankfurt answered with RB Decori Birmingham getting a 5-yard TD run, yet the Sea Devils closed out the half with kicker Shane Andrus getting a 24-yard field goal. In the third quarter, the Galaxy played some catch-up with O'Sullivan completing a 24-TD pass to WR Robert Ortiz. However, Hamburg would eventually respond with Bramlet completing a 51-yard TD pass to WR Josh Davis. Frankfurt would eventually get one last score with RB Sha-ron Edwards getting a 2-yard TD run at the end of the third quarter. However, in the fourth quarter, the Sea Devils took control for the rest of the game. They would get the only score of the quarter with Bramlet hooking up again with Maxwell on a 10-yard TD pass. With the win, Hamburg stripped the Galaxy of their championship title and won their first World Bowl title in their three-year history. The win also marked the fourth-straight year that a team lost in the World Bowl after having won the title in the previous year.

=== Scoring summary ===
- Hamburg - TD Jenkins 3 yd pass from Bramlet (PAT failed) 8:04 1st
- Hamburg - TD Maxwell 35 yd pass from Bramlet 3:28 1st
- Frankfurt - TD Middleton 24 yd pass from O'Sullivan 12:28 2nd
- Hamburg - TD Allen 33 yd run 7:56 2nd
- Frankfurt - TD Birmingham 5 yd run 4:28 2nd
- Hamburg - FG Andrus 24 yd 0:03 2nd
- Frankfurt - TD Ortiz 24 yd pass from O'Sullivan 11:35 3rd
- Hamburg - TD Davis 51 yd pass from Bramlet 4:27 3rd
- Frankfurt - TD Edwards 2 yd run 0:00 3rd
- Hamburg - TD Maxwell 10 yd pass from Bramlet 10:55 4th

== See also ==
- 2007 in American football
