= 2007 Berlin Thunder season =

NFL Europa team season

- General manager: Joe Cealera
- Head coach: John Allen
- Home stadium: Olympic Stadium

Results
- Record: 2–8
- Division place: 6th
- Playoffs: did not qualify

The 2007 Berlin Thunder season was the ninth and final season for the franchise in the NFL Europa League (NFLEL). The team was led by head coach John Allen in his first year, and played its home games at Olympic Stadium in Berlin, Germany. They finished the regular season in sixth place with a record of two wins and eight losses. The National Football League (NFL) announced the closure of its European branch on June 29.

== Offseason ==
=== Free agent draft ===
2007 Berlin Thunder NFLEL free agent draft selections
Draft order		Player name	Position	College
Round	Choice	Player name	Position	College
1	1	Chris Thompson	CB	Nicholls State
2	7	Lauvale Sape	DT	Utah
3	18	Seante Williams	DE	Jacksonville State
4	19	Jabari Levey	T	South Carolina
5	30	Chris Harrell	CB	Penn State
6	31	Matt Henshaw	TE	Florida State
7	42	Steve Paris	S	Iowa State
8	43	Damien Rhodes	RB	Syracuse
9	54	Keon Raymond	CB	Middle Tennessee
10	55	Quartez Vickerson	DT	Grand Valley State
11	66	Steven Vieira	G	UCLA
12	67	Samario Houston	LB	Catawba
13	78	Jameel Dumas	LB	Syracuse
14	79	Jay McCareins	CB	Princeton
15	90	Robin Meadow	T	Washington
16	91	Sha-Ron Edwards	RB	Illinois State
17	102	Bernard Opoku	S	Jacksonville
18	103	Bobby Payne	DE	Middle Tennessee
19	114	Daniel Martz	C	Alabama
20	115	Jason Flowers	CB	Toledo
21	126	Tim Clarke	LB	Lenoir–Rhyne
22	127	Mike Mendenhall	DE	Temple
23	133	Scott Mitchell	WR	Kentucky

== Personnel ==
=== Staff ===
2007 Berlin Thunder staff
Front office: General manager – Joe Cealera; Head coaches: Head coach/wide receivers – John Allen; Offensive coaches: Offensive coordinator/offensive line – Don Lawrence; Quarterbacks – Cory Sauter; National coach/running backs – Wanja Müller; Tight ends – Willard Scissum	Defensive coaches: Defensive coordinator/defensive backs – Adrian White; Defensive line – Darryl Sims; Assistant defensive line – Mike Jones; Linebackers – Kurt Gouveia; Special teams coaches: National coach/special teams coordinator – Wanja Müller; Strength and conditioning: Strength and conditioning – Mike Berezowski

=== Roster ===
2007 Berlin Thunder final roster
Quarterbacks: 10 Bruce Eugene; 7 Travis Lulay; 4 Omar Jacobs (IR); Running backs: 23 Chris Barclay; 25 Cal Murray; 32 Damien Rhodes (IR); Wide receivers: 81 Carlton Brewster; 82 Ryan Hoag; 81 Rich Musinski (IR); 12 Steve Sanders; 80 Kyle Smith; Tight ends: 83 Rob Abiamiri; 87 Charles Davis; 40 Matt Guardia LS; 49 Alex Shor	Offensive linemen: 63 Jasper Harvey C (IR); 53 Rob Hunt G/C; 71 Jabari Levey T; 65 Tyler McMeans G; 69 Matt Ulrich G; 75 Steven Vieira T; Defensive linemen: 91 Walter Curry DE; 98 Jason Peterson DE; 95 Lauvale Sape DT; 99 Bryant Shaw DT; 90 Dave Tollefson DE; 96 Quartez Vickerson DT	Linebackers: 45 Tim Clarke OLB; 50 Jameel Dumas OLB; 41 Tim Goodwell OLB; 56 Samario Houston OLB (IR); 58 Mike Mendenhall MLB; Defensive backs: 24 Dennis Davis CB; 22 Jason Flowers CB; 27 Chris Harrell SS; 20 Josh Lay CB; 28 Steve Paris FS; 35 Etric Pruitt SS (IR); 21 Chris Thompson CB; 26 Vickiel Vaughn SS; 31 Gerard Washington CB; Special teams: 2 D. J. Fitzpatrick K; 6 Andrew Jacas K; 1 Tom Malone P	National players: 56 (Germany) Richard Adjei OLB; 92 (Germany) Patrick Finke DE; 29 (Germany) Oliver Flemming FS; 88 (Mexico) Alejandro Gamez WR; 66 (Mexico) Juan Garcia G; 64 (Germany) Samuel Gutekunst T; 11 (China) Ding Long K; 97 (Germany) Constantin Ritzmann DE; 51 (England) Shaun Smith MLB; 18 (Mexico) Gustavo Tella WR; 9 (China) Gao Wei K; Rookies in italics

== Schedule ==
Week	Date	Kickoff (Note: All times are in Central European Summer Time (CEST).)	Opponent	Results		Game site	Attendance
Week	Date	Kickoff	Opponent	Final score	Team record	Game site	Attendance
1	Saturday, April 14	7:00 p.m.	at Rhein Fire	W 15–3	1–0	LTU arena	30,355
2	Sunday, April 22	4:00 p.m.	Hamburg Sea Devils	L 7–16	1–1	Olympic Stadium	30,657
3	Saturday, April 28	6:00 p.m.	Amsterdam Admirals	L 10–14	1–2	Olympic Stadium	11,942
4	Saturday, May 5	6:00 p.m.	at Cologne Centurions	W 31–28	2–2	RheinEnergieStadion	10,084
5	Sunday, May 13	4:00 p.m.	Cologne Centurions	L 10–24	2–3	Olympic Stadium	11,995
6	Sunday, May 20	5:00 p.m.	at Frankfurt Galaxy	L 7–35	2–4	Commerzbank-Arena	30,125
7	Saturday, May 26	6:00 p.m.	at Hamburg Sea Devils	L 7–17	2–5	AOL Arena	18,337
8	Saturday, June 2	6:00 p.m.	Frankfurt Galaxy	L 22–25	2–6	Olympic Stadium	11,882
9	Friday, June 8	7:00 p.m.	Rhein Fire	L 17–24	2–7	Olympic Stadium	12,114
10	Friday, June 15	8:00 p.m.	at Amsterdam Admirals	L 20–21	2–8	Olympic Stadium	11,893

== Standings ==
NFL Europa League
Team	W	L	T	PCT	PF	PA	Home	Road	STK
Hamburg Sea Devils	7	3	0	.700	231	176	4–1	3–2	W4
Frankfurt Galaxy	7	3	0	.700	254	179	5–0	2–3	W1
Cologne Centurions	6	4	0	.600	205	172	2–3	4–1	L1
Rhein Fire	4	6	0	.400	166	212	2–3	2–3	L1
Amsterdam Admirals	4	6	0	.400	194	250	3–2	1–4	W1
Berlin Thunder	2	8	0	.200	146	207	0–5	2–3	L6

== Game summaries ==
=== Week 1: at Rhein Fire ===
Week One: Berlin Thunder at Rhein Fire – Game summary

Quarter	1	2	3	4	Total
Berlin	0	4	4	7	15
Rhein	0	3	0	0	3

at LTU arena, Düsseldorf, Germany

- Date: Saturday, April 14
- Game time: 7:06 p.m. CEST
- Game weather: 71 °F (21.7 °C), sunny
- Game attendance: 30,355
- Referee: Carl Cheffers
- TV announcers (NFL Network): Scott Graham and Doug Graber

=== Week 2: vs Hamburg Sea Devils ===
Week Two: Hamburg Sea Devils at Berlin Thunder – Game summary

Quarter	1	2	3	4	Total
Hamburg	0	10	3	3	16
Berlin	0	0	0	7	7

at Olympic Stadium, Berlin, Germany

- Date: Sunday, April 22
- Game time: 4:02 p.m. CEST
- Game weather: 64 °F (17.8 °C), sunny
- Game attendance: 30,657
- Referee: Don Carey
- TV announcers (NFL Network): Scott Graham and Doug Graber

=== Week 3: vs Amsterdam Admirals ===
Week Three: Amsterdam Admirals at Berlin Thunder – Game summary

Quarter	1	2	3	4	Total
Amsterdam	7	0	0	7	14
Berlin	0	0	10	0	10

at Olympic Stadium, Berlin, Germany

- Date: Saturday, April 28
- Game time: 6:06 p.m. CEST
- Game weather: 76 °F (24.4 °C), sunny
- Game attendance: 11,942
- Referee: John Hussey
- TV announcers (DirecTV): Scott Graham and DeAngelo Hall

=== Week 4: at Cologne Centurions ===
Week Four: Berlin Thunder at Cologne Centurions – Game summary

Quarter	1	2	3	4	Total
Berlin	0	14	3	14	31
Cologne	14	14	0	0	28

at RheinEnergieStadion, Cologne, Germany

- Date: Saturday, May 5
- Game time: 6:07 p.m. CEST
- Game weather: 72 °F (22.2 °C), mostly cloudy
- Game attendance: 10,084
- Referee: John Parry

=== Week 5: vs Cologne Centurions ===
Week Five: Cologne Centurions at Berlin Thunder – Game summary

Quarter	1	2	3	4	Total
Cologne	7	3	14	0	24
Berlin	3	0	0	7	10

at Olympic Stadium, Berlin, Germany

- Date: Sunday, May 13
- Game time: 4:00 p.m.
- Game attendance: 11.995

=== Week 6: at Frankfurt Galaxy ===
Week Six: Berlin Thunder at Frankfurt Galaxy – Game summary

Quarter	1	2	3	4	Total
Berlin	0	7	0	0	7
Frankfurt	14	14	7	0	35

at Commerzbank-Arena, Frankfurt, Germany

- Date: Sunday, May 20
- Game time: 5:00 p.m. CEST
- Game attendance: 30,125

=== Week 7: at Hamburg Sea Devils ===
Week Seven: Berlin Thunder at Hamburg Sea Devils – Game summary

Quarter	1	2	3	4	Total
Berlin	3	4	0	0	7
Hamburg	0	3	0	14	17

at AOL Arena, Hamburg, Germany

- Date: Saturday, May 26
- Game time: 6:00 p.m.
- Game attendance: 18,337

=== Week 8: vs Frankfurt Galaxy ===
Week Eight: Frankfurt Galaxy at Berlin Thunder – Game summary

Quarter	1	2	3	4	Total
Frankfurt	3	0	0	22	25
Berlin	7	0	8	7	22

at Olympic Stadium, Berlin, Germany

- Date: Saturday, June 2
- Game time: 6:00 p.m.
- Game attendance: 11,882

=== Week 9: vs Rhein Fire ===
Week Nine: Rhein Fire at Berlin Thunder – Game summary

Quarter	1	2	3	4	Total
Rhein	14	10	0	0	24
Berlin	7	10	0	0	17

at Olympic Stadium, Berlin, Germany

- Date: Friday, June 8
- Game time: 7:00 p.m.
- Game attendance: 12,114

=== Week 10: at Amsterdam Admirals ===
Week Ten: Berlin Thunder at Amsterdam Admirals – Game summary

Quarter	1	2	3	4	Total
Berlin	3	10	7	0	20
Amsterdam	0	7	0	14	21

at Olympic Stadium, Amsterdam, Netherlands

- Date: Friday, June 15
- Game time: 8:07 p.m. CEST
- Game weather: 70 °F (21.1 °C), partly cloudy, light rain
- Game attendance: 11,893
- Referee: Tom Symonette
- TV announcers (NFL Network): Michael Reghi and Doug Graber

== Honors ==
- Chris Barclay, Special Teams Player of the Week (Week 4)
- Carlton Brewster, All-NFL Europa League team selection
- Andrew Jacas, Special Teams Player of the Week (Week 1)
- Chris Thompson, Defensive Player of the Week (Week 10)
