= Roberto Ortiz =

Roberto Ortiz may refer to:

- Roberto María Ortiz (1886–1942), President of Argentina from 1938 to 1942
- Roberto Ortiz (baseball) (1915–1971), Cuban baseball player
- Roberto Ortiz (umpire) (born 1984), Puerto Rican baseball umpire
- Roberto Ortiz (boxer) (born 1985), Mexican boxer

== See also ==
- Robert Ortiz, American football wide receiver
