= 2010 draft =

2010 draft may refer to drafts held in several different sports leagues around the world in the year 2010, including:

- The 2010 WPS Draft for Women's Professional Soccer, held on January 15
- The 2010 WNBA draft for the Women's National Basketball Association, held on April 8
- The 2010 NFL draft for the National Football League, held from April 22–24
- The 2010 WWE draft for World Wrestling Entertainment, held from April 26–27
- The 2010 CFL draft for the Canadian Football League, held on May 2
- The 2010 UFL draft for the United Football League, held on June 2
- The 2010 KHL Junior Draft for the Kontinental Hockey League, held on June 4
- The 2010 Major League Baseball draft for Major League Baseball, held from June 7–9
- The 2010 NBA draft for the National Basketball Association, held on June 24
- The 2010 NHL entry draft for the National Hockey League, held from June 25–26
- The 2010 CWHL Draft for the Canadian Women's Hockey League, held on August 12
- The 2010 PBA Draft for the Philippine Basketball Association, held on August 29
- The 2010 NBA Development League Draft for the NBA Development League, held on November 1
- The 2010 AFL draft for the Australian Football League, held on November 18
