= Shane Garrett =

American football player (born 1967)

No. 89
- Position: Wide receiver

Personal information
- Born: November 16, 1967 (age 58); Lafayette, Louisiana, U.S.
- Listed height: 5 ft 11 in (1.80 m)
- Listed weight: 185 lb (84 kg)

Career information
- High school: Crowley (Crowley, Louisiana)
- College: Texas A&M
- NFL draft: 1991: 9th round, 241st overall pick

Career history
- Cincinnati Bengals (1991–1992); Milwaukee Mustangs (1995); Florida Bobcats (1996–1997)

Career NFL statistics
- Receptions: 3
- Receiving yards: 32
- Return yards: 221
- Stats at Pro Football Reference

Career AFL statistics
- Receptions: 52
- Receiving yards: 666
- Receiving touchdowns: 6
- Stats at ArenaFan.com

Marcus Shane Garrett (born November 16, 1967) is an American former professional football player who was a wide receiver who played one season with the Cincinnati Bengals of the National Football League (NFL). He played college football for the Texas A&M Aggies.

== Early life ==
Garrett was born on November 16, 1967, in Lafayette, Louisiana. He grew up in Crowley, Louisiana, attending Crowley High School and playing as a wide receiver on the school's football team. He was a member of Louisiana's Super Dozen class of 1987.

== College career ==
Garrett played for the Texas A&M Aggies from 1988 to 1990, making 35 catches for 696 yards and five receiving touchdowns. He also scored one rushing touchdown and saw action as a kick returner.

== NFL career ==
Garrett was selected in the ninth round of the 1991 NFL draft by the Cincinnati Bengals. He played in four games with the team in 1991, mostly as a kick and punt returner, though he also made three receptions for 32 yards at wide receiver.

He was put on injured reserve on August 14, 1992, and released on February 12, 1993.
