= Michael Ray Garvin =

American football player (born 1986)

No. 10
- Position: Wide receiver / defensive back

Personal information
- Born: September 29, 1986 (age 40); Upper Saddle River, New Jersey, U.S.
- Listed height: 5 ft 8 in (1.73 m)
- Listed weight: 198 lb (90 kg)

Career information
- High school: Don Bosco Prep (Ramsey, New Jersey)
- College: Florida State
- NFL draft: 2009: undrafted

Career history
- Arizona Cardinals (2009); Detroit Lions (2009–2010)*; Las Vegas Locomotives (2010)*; Texas Revolution (2013)*; Winnipeg Blue Bombers (2014)*
- * Offseason or practice squad member only

Awards and highlights
- First-team All-American (2008); Second-team All-ACC (2008)

Michael Ray Garvin (born September 29, 1986) is an American former college football player who was a cornerback for the Florida State Seminoles. He earned first-team All-American honors in 2008. He was signed by the Arizona Cardinals of the National Football League (NFL) as an undrafted free agent in 2009. Garvin has also been a member of the NFL's Detroit Lions and the United Football League's Las Vegas Locomotives.

== Early life ==
Hailing from Upper Saddle River, New Jersey, Garvin attended Don Bosco Preparatory High School in Ramsey, New Jersey where he played football and ran track.

As a junior, Garvin rushed for 615 yards on 32 carries for six touchdowns. As a defensive back, he recorded 45 tackles and four interceptions, two of which were returned for touchdowns. As a senior, he recorded 50 tackles and three interceptions. For his career, Garvin rushed for 1,600 yards and 34 total touchdowns.

While at Don Bosco, Garvin played in the Army All-American game, was ranked the fifth best player in New Jersey by Rivals.com, he was also a four-star player, rated by Rivals.com and the 85th best player in the nation. He was rated the fourth best player in the state by Superprep Magazine and the 16th best defensive back in the nation. He was also an All-State first-team selection as a member of the school's track team.

== College career ==
After graduating from Don Bosco in 2005, Garvin attended Florida State University.

=== Football ===
As a true freshman in 2005, Garvin appeared all 11 of the Seminoles games, recording 16 tackles, one sack, a forced fumble and one pass break-up. He ranked first on the team, among true freshmen, with 12 solo tackles.

As a sophomore in 2006, he appeared in all 13 games while earning starts against NC State, Duke, Virginia, Wake Forest, Western Michigan and Florida and finished sixth on the team with 35 tackles. On the season, he was one of two Seminoles who recorded a sack, tackle-for-loss, interception, pass-break-up and fumble recovery, the other being Lawrence Timmons. Garvin was also the team's leader in kickoff returns with 16 for 362 yards and ranked ninth in the ACC with a 22.6 yards-per-kick return average.

As a junior in 2007, Garvin started eight games and led the team's cornerbacks in tackles with 49.

As a senior in 2008, Garvin recorded 12 tackles on the season and became the only player in school history to average 30 yards or more per return in a season in 2008 with 30.1. He was also a Sporting News first-team All-American as a kick returner and was a third-team All-American by SI.com and Scout. He finished the season second in the nation in kick off returns and led the conference as well. He earned All-Acc second-team honors as a specialist. He was also the defensive special teams' player of the year, as voted by the team's coaching staff. He set the school record for career kickoff return yards (1,721), average yards-per-return (23.57) and tied Keith Ross for the all-time record for returns in a career with 73.

Garvin's father, Johnny Ray Garvin, was his secondary position coach in high school and had a short stint in the National Football League and USFL.

Garvin earned his undergraduate degree in social science in December 2008.

== Track and field ==
While at Florida State University, Garvin was a seven-time All-American sprinter and a member of the winning 4 x 100 metres relay in 2007 NCAA outdoors. He also attempted to make the United States Olympic track and field team in the spring of 2008, qualifying for the trials and making it to the semifinals of the 200 meters.

=== 2006 ===
In indoor, he only competed at the ACC Championships. He ran a season-best of 6.85 seconds in the 60 meters prelims to tie teammate Antone Smith for sixth. He advanced to the finals where he ran a time of 6.87 seconds and finished sixth. He also raced in the 200 meters where he placed 15th in the prelims with a time of 21.98 seconds.

In outdoor, he captured his first All-America honors by taking eighth at the NCAA Championships in the 200 meters with a time of 21.05 seconds. He was member of the winning 4 x 100 metres relay team at the NCAA East Regionals that posted a time of 39.03 seconds. He advanced to the NCAA Championships by taking fourth in the 200 meters at the East Regional. He clocked a time of 20.75 seconds in the finals, the third-fastest time in the ACC. He earned All-ACC honors by placing third in the 100 meters with a time of 10.58 seconds at the league championship. He also scored points at the ACC meet by taking fourth in the 200 meters, with a time of 21.39 seconds and running the second leg of the second-place 4 x 100 metres relay. He also ran a season-best time of 10.47 seconds twice in the preliminary race at the league championships and during the finals of the 100 meters at the Seminole Invitational.

=== 2007 ===
In indoor, he advanced to the NCAA Indoor Championships where he ran a 6.78 in the prelims of the 60 meters. He earned a pair of All-ACC honors with second-place finishes in the 60 meters and 200 meters at the conference championships. He ran a season-best time of 21.37 seconds in the finals of the 200 meters. Finished second with a time of 6.68 seconds in the finals of the 60 meters. Posted a season-best of 6.66 seconds to take third during the prelims of the 60 meters at the New Balance Invitational. That time was the fifth-fastest in the ACC.

In outdoor, he was member of the winning 4 x 100 metres relay team at the NCAA Outdoor Championships, with a school and conference record time of 38.60 seconds, and of the 4 x 100 metres relay at the NCAA East Region that won the event with a regional record of 38.71 seconds. He earned All-America honors by taking third in the 100 meters at the national meet with a time of 10.30 seconds. He also posted a personal best time of 10.10 seconds in the prelims. He reached the semifinals of the 200 meters at the NCAA Championships with a time of 20.81 seconds. He took home fourth in the 200 meters at the East Regionals with a time of 20.70 seconds. He also had the fastest time in the prelims with a personal-best time of 20.58 seconds, that is the seventh-best in school history and third in the ACC last year.

While at Florida State, Garvin was a seven-time All-American sprinter and a member of the winning 4x100 meter relay in 2007 NCAA outdoors. He also attempted to make the United States Olympic track and field team in the spring of 2008, qualifying for the trials and making it to the semifinals of the 200 meters.

==== Personal bests ====
Event	Time (seconds)	Venue	Date
60 meters	6.59	Blacksburg, Virginia	February 28, 2009
100 meters	10.10	Sacramento, California	June 6, 2007
200 meters	20.58	Gainesville, Florida	May 25, 2007
400 meters	46.61	Tallahassee, Florida	May 10, 2008

== Professional career ==
=== 2009 Florida State's Pro Day ===
Pre-draft measurables
Height	Weight	40-yard dash	10-yard split	20-yard split	20-yard shuttle	Three-cone drill	Vertical jump	Broad jump
5 ft 8 in (1.73 m)	174 lb (79 kg)	4.24 s	1.42 s	2.41 s	4.06 s	6.97 s	36 in (0.91 m)	10 ft 8 in (3.25 m)
All values from NFL Combine

=== Arizona Cardinals ===
Garvin went unselected in the 2009 NFL draft and was signed by the Arizona Cardinals. While with the Cardinals he was converted from cornerback to wide receiver.

=== Detroit Lions ===
He was later signed to the Detroit Lions practice squad during the 2009 season. Garvin was waived on April 26, 2010.

=== Las Vegas Locomotives ===
The Las Vegas Locomotives selected Garvin with their second round pick in the 2010 UFL draft.

=== Winnipeg Blue Bombers ===
Garvin signed with the Winnipeg Blue Bombers on March 28, 2014. He was released by the Blue Bombers on June 22, 2014.
