= Greg Middleton =

American football player (born 1986)

No. 92
- Position: Defensive end

Personal information
- Born: December 1, 1986 (age 39); Indianapolis, Indiana, U.S.
- Listed height: 6 ft 3 in (1.91 m)
- Listed weight: 285 lb (129 kg)

Career information
- High school: Indianapolis (IN) Pike
- College: Indiana
- NFL draft: 2010: undrafted

Career history
- Florida Tuskers (2010)

Awards and highlights
- First-team All-American (2007); Second-team All-American (2008); First-team All-Big Ten (2007); First-team All-Big Ten (2008)

Gregory Alan Middleton Jr. (born December 1, 1986) is an American former football defensive end. He played college football for the Indiana Hoosiers. In 2007, he led the country with 16 sacks.

== Early life ==
Middleton played high school football at Pike High School.

== College career ==
In 2006, as a true freshman, Middleton played in five games and made six tackles. His collegiate debut came against Illinois.

Middleton was named starter for the first game of the year against Indiana State and recorded two sacks. On September 9, 2007, against Western Michigan, Middleton recovered a fumble and returned it for a 44-yard touchdown. Through, three games Middleton had five sacks which ranked him as the best in the Big Ten and second in all of college football. Middleton was named to the Tom Hendricks Defensive Player of the Year watchlist on October 19, and was only one of eight sophomores on the list. At the time of being named to the list he had 9.5 sacks and still led the Big Ten and was still in the nation with that amount. He was one half of a sack away from being the fourth player for the Hoosiers to have double digits in that category. By November 10, Middleton had added four more sacks, tying him for the lead in the nation with South Florida's George Selvie. Following the season he was named First-team All-Big Ten by both the media and coaches. He ended the season with 16 sacks, which broke Van Waiters's school record of 14 which he set in 1987. Middleton added 50 tackles, two fumble recoveries, one forced fumble and four passes broken up.

In 2008 as a junior, Middleton played in 11 games and ended the year with four sacks, 18 tackles, two fumble recoveries. His 20 career sacks ranks him fourth all-time for Indiana. He was named First-team All-Big Ten and was a Second-team All-American.

In 2009 Middleton played 12 games and made 38 tackles (8.5 for losses) and 3 sacks broke up two passes and forced a fumble.

After going undrafted by the NFL, Middleton was drafted by the Florida Tuskers in the 11th round (54th pick overall) in the 2010 UFL draft.
