= Zac Woodfin =

American football player and coach (born 1983)

Tennessee Titans
- Title: Director of sports performance

Personal information
- Born: March 19, 1983 (age 43); Montgomery, Alabama, U.S.
- Listed height: 6 ft 1 in (1.85 m)
- Listed weight: 239 lb (108 kg)

Career information
- Position: Linebacker (No. 59)
- High school: Prattville (Prattville, Alabama)
- College: UAB
- NFL draft: 2005: undrafted

Career history

Playing
- Green Bay Packers (2005)*; New Orleans Saints (2005)*; Baltimore Ravens (2005–2006); Frankfurt Galaxy (2007); Houston Texans (2007)*
- * Offseason or practice squad member only

Coaching
- Green Bay Packers (2011–2013) Strength and conditioning assistant; UAB (2014) Strength and conditioning coach; Southern Miss (2014–2017) Strength and conditioning coach; Kansas (2017–2019) Strength and conditioning coach; Missouri (2019–2021) Director of athletic performance; Tennessee Titans (2024–present) Director of sports performance
- Stats at Pro Football Reference

Zac Woodfin (born March 19, 1983) is an American football coach and former linebacker, who is currently the director of sports performance for the Tennessee Titans. He was originally signed by the Green Bay Packers as an undrafted free agent in 2005, and went on to have stints with the Baltimore Ravens, Frankfurt Galaxy and the Houston Texans. Woodfin attended Prattville High School. He played college football for the UAB Blazers.

== College career ==
In 2004, Woodfin recorded 15 tackles against Houston, he later received C-USA player of the week honors for his accomplishment. He finished with a school-record of 372 tackles.

== Professional career ==
Pre-draft measurables
Height	Weight	40-yard dash	Vertical jump	Broad jump	Bench press
6 ft 0 3/4 in (1.85 m)	239 lb (108 kg)	4.63 s	37.0 in (0.94 m)	9 ft 1 in (2.77 m)	28 reps
All values from Pro Day

During the 2005 Combine, Woodfin was clocked with 4.7 40 yard dash, 37-inch vertical jump and scored a 21 on the Wonderlic intelligence test. He was not selected in the 2005 NFL draft, however he received training camp offers from the Chicago Bears and the Green Bay Packers. On April 26, 2005, the Packers signed Woodfin and linebacker Roy Manning. Woodfin, and wide receiver Craig Bragg were released by the Packers on November 2, 2005. After being cut by the Packers, Woodfin became a member of the New Orleans Saints practice squad. On December 9, 2005, Woodfin was signed to the practice squad after linebacker Ray Lewis was placed on injured reserve. On June 20, 2006, Woodfin, along with quarterback Sonny Cumbie, linebacker Ricky Foley and defensive back Zach Norton, were released by the Baltimore Ravens. On July 10, 2006, Woodfin and former Vikings' receiver Bethel Johnson signed with the Houston Texans. He was selected in the first round of the 2007 NFL Europe Draft by the Frankfurt Galaxy.

== Post career ==
In 2006, Woodfin was an intern at UAB. He assisted with football, men's and women's basketball as well as track and field programs. In 2007, he volunteered for Alabama's football team to help assist with in-season training. After he was cut by the Texans, he was hired as a performance specialist at Athletes' Performance in Los Angeles. He worked with many clients who played for various organizations in the NFL, NBA, MLB and even Olympic athletes. His main focus was on off-season training for NFL veterans as well as Combine training for recently graduated college players including Sione Fua, Mason Foster and Taiwan Jones. On February 22, 2011, Woodfin was hired by the Packers as a strength and conditioning assistant. His roles included designing, organizing and implementing strength and conditioning programs as well as speed and agility sessions. He replaced former strength and conditioning specialist Dave Redding. On January 22, 2014, Woodfin was hired by his alma mater UAB as head of the Blazers strength and conditioning program. The UAB football program was eliminated in December 2014. On December 29, Woodfin was reported to have accepted the head strength and conditioning job at the University of Southern Mississippi.

On February 23, 2017, Woodfin was hired as the new head strength and conditioning coach at the University of Kansas.

Woodfin was hired as the director of athletic performance by the University of Missouri on December 26, 2019.

On March 21, 2024, Woodfin was hired as the director of sports performance for the Tennessee Titans.

== Personal life ==
Woodfin received a bachelor of science degree in exercise science from UAB. He is married to his wife, Fawn. They have two children, and currently reside in Nashville, Tennessee.
