= Bobby Harris =

American gridiron football player (born 1983)

Profile
- Position: Offensive lineman

Personal information
- Born: June 15, 1983 (age 43); Richmond, Virginia, U.S.
- Listed height: 6 ft 3 in (1.91 m)
- Listed weight: 310 lb (141 kg)

Career information
- College: Ole Miss
- NFL draft: 2006: undrafted

Career history
- 2006: San Francisco 49ers*
- 2007: Frankfurt Galaxy
- 2007: Carolina Panthers*
- 2008: Orlando Predators
- 2009: Saskatchewan Roughriders
- 2010: Florida Tuskers
- * Offseason or practice squad member only

Bobby Harris (born June 15, 1983) is a former professional American and Canadian football offensive lineman. He was signed by the San Francisco 49ers as an undrafted free agent in 2006. He played college football for the Ole Miss Rebels.

Harris was also a member of the Frankfurt Galaxy, Carolina Panthers, Orlando Predators, Saskatchewan Roughriders, and Florida Tuskers.
