= Andre Ellington =

American football player (born 1989)

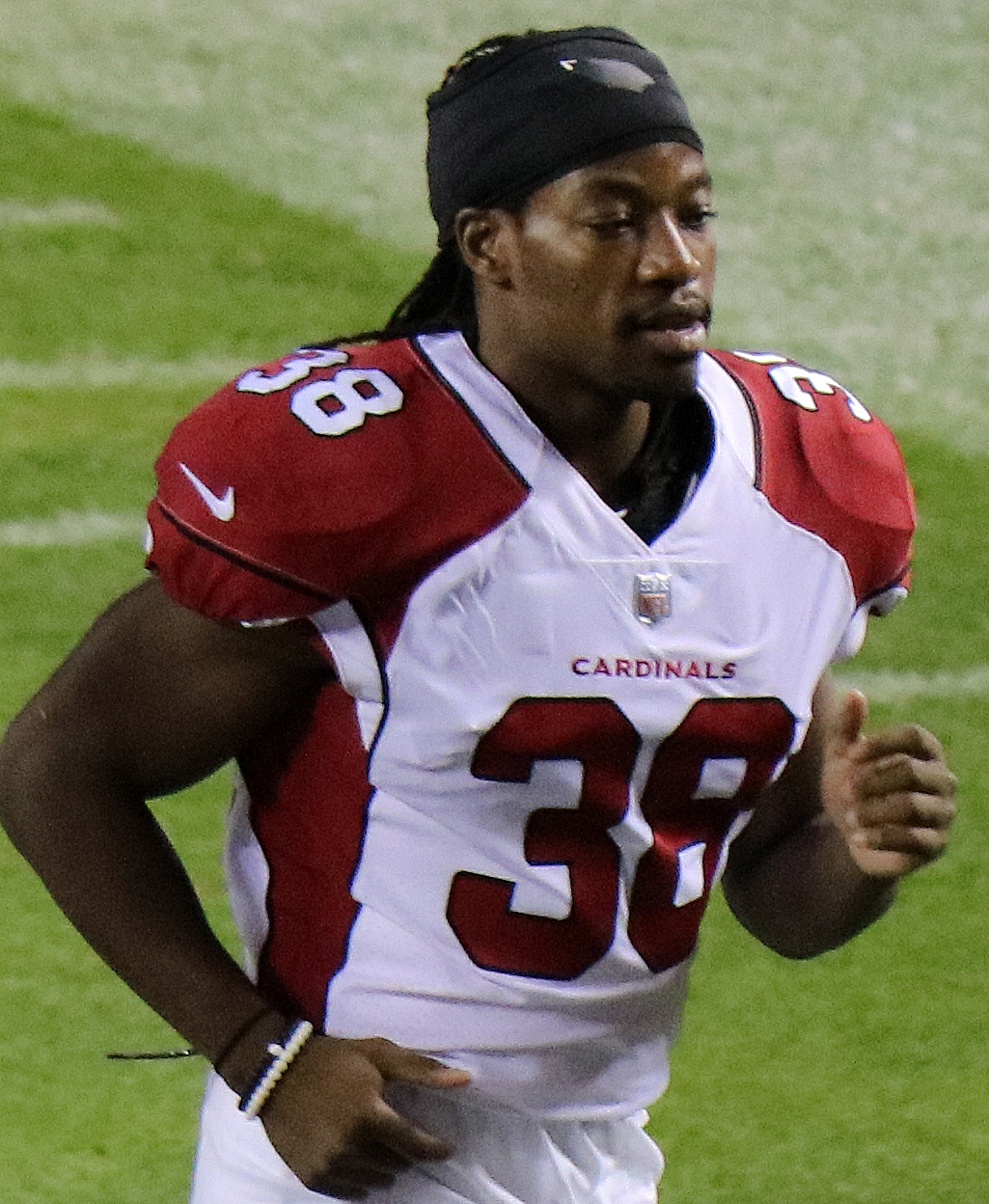
- Ellington with the Arizona Cardinals in 2017

No. 38
- Position: Running back

Personal information
- Born: February 3, 1989 (age 37); Moncks Corner, South Carolina, U.S.
- Listed height: 5 ft 9 in (1.75 m)
- Listed weight: 199 lb (90 kg)

Career information
- High school: Berkeley (Moncks Corner)
- College: Clemson (2008–2012)
- NFL draft: 2013: 6th round, 187th overall pick

Career history
- Arizona Cardinals (2013–2017); Houston Texans (2017); Tampa Bay Buccaneers (2019)*
- * Offseason or practice squad member only

Awards and highlights
- First-team All-ACC (2012); Second-team All-ACC (2011)

Career NFL statistics
- Rushing yards: 1,752
- Rushing average: 4.2
- Rushing touchdowns: 10
- Receptions: 151
- Receiving yards: 1,368
- Receiving touchdowns: 3
- Stats at Pro Football Reference

Andre DeAngelo Ellington (born February 3, 1989) is an American former professional football player who was a running back in the National Football League (NFL). He played college football for the Clemson Tigers and was selected by the Arizona Cardinals in the sixth round of the 2013 NFL draft.

== Early life ==
Ellington attended Berkeley High School, where he played high school football for the Stags football team. As a senior, he rushed for 1,822 yards and 24 touchdowns, and also added four other touchdowns (two receiving, two kickoff return). He accumulated 2,519 all-purpose yards as a senior. ESPN named him the #44 overall prospect and #6 running back.

Ellington also ran track and field for the Berkeley High School track team. He ran a personal-best time of 10.97 seconds in the 100 meters at the 2006 Taco Belt Classic Melt. He also recorded a time of 23.13 seconds in the 200 meters. He was also a member of the 4 × 100 m (42.94 s) relay squad.

He picked Clemson over scholarship offers from Florida, Georgia, Kentucky, Maryland, North Carolina, South Carolina, and Tennessee.

== College career ==
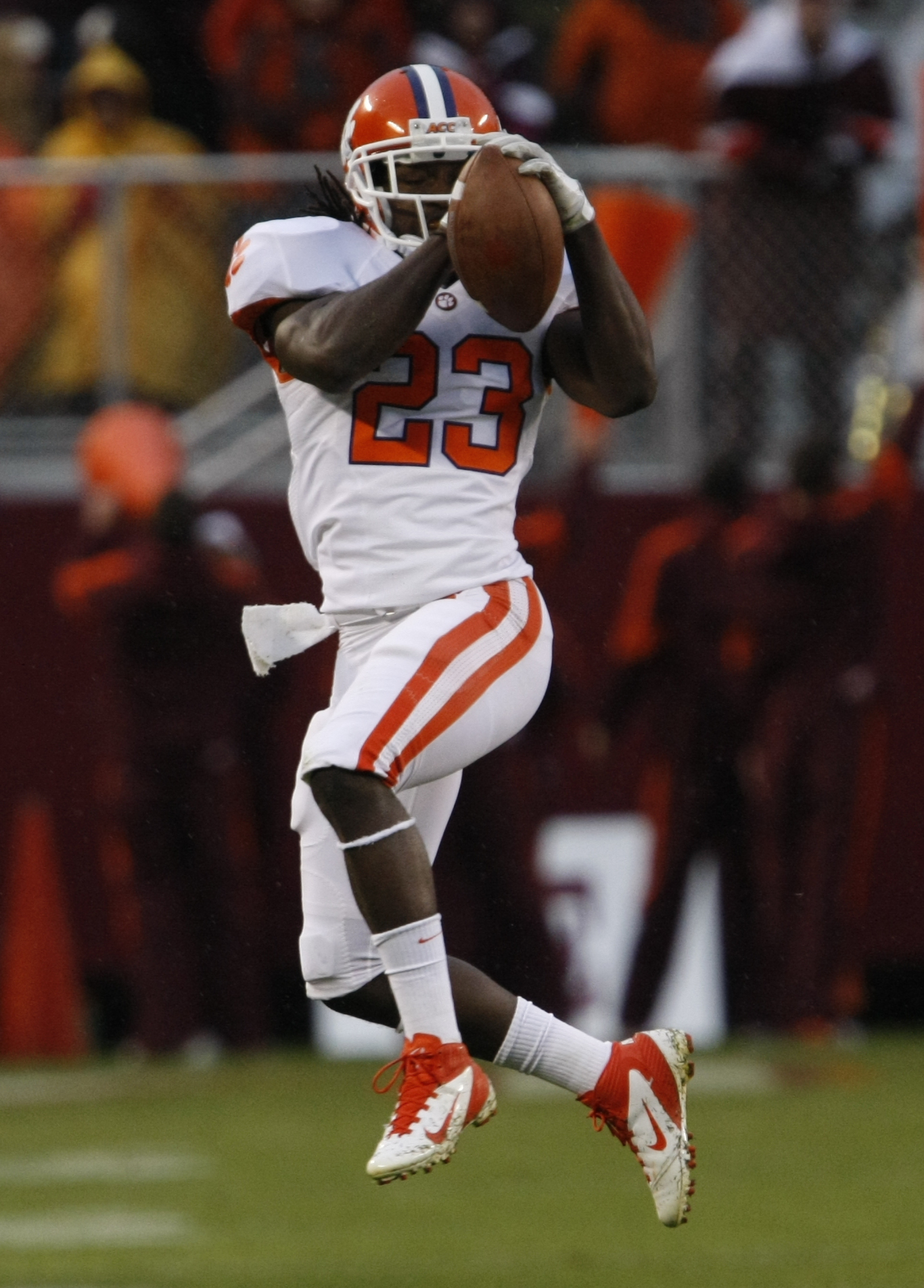
Andre Ellington catching a ball at Clemson

=== Freshman season ===
After redshirting his true freshman season in 2008, Ellington had 546 total yards on 79 touches in 2009. He rushed for 72 yards on nine carries against Middle Tennessee.

=== Sophomore season ===
As a sophomore in 2010, Ellington was named second-team All-ACC by Rivals.com. He rushed for 686 yards on 118 carries and 10 touchdowns. He caught 12 passes for 109 yards and a touchdown. Ellington had 140 yards in 22 carries and four catches for 48 yards against eventual national champion Auburn.

=== Junior season ===
As a junior in 2011, Ellington rushed for 1,178 yards on 223 attempts scoring 11 touchdowns. Additionally, he caught 22 passes for 109 yards. He earned second-team all-conference honors in recognition of his successful season.

In the 2011 ACC Championship Game, he ran for 125 yards and one touchdown on 20 carries, as the Tigers beat the Virginia Tech Hokies, 38–10.

Clemson lost the 2012 Orange Bowl to the West Virginia Mountaineers, by a 70–33 scoreline. Ellington rushed for 116 yards from 10 carries, including a 68-yard run for the game's opening touchdown.

=== Senior season ===
In his final season as a senior in 2012, Ellington rushed for 1,081 yards on 212 attempts (5.1 avg) while scoring eight touchdowns. He also caught 14 passes for 232 yards and a touchdown. He earned first-team all-conference honors. He finished his college career at fourth on Clemson's list of all-time rushers with 3,436 yards, just below former teammate C. J. Spiller, and finished third in rushing touchdowns with 33. Ellington graduated from Clemson in December 2012 with a bachelor's degree in parks, recreation, and tourism management.

== Professional career ==
=== Pre-draft ===
Pre-draft measurables
Height	Weight	Arm length	Hand span	40-yard dash	10-yard split	20-yard split	Vertical jump	Broad jump
5 ft 9 1/4 in (1.76 m)	199 lb (90 kg)	31 in (0.79 m)	9 3/8 in (0.24 m)	4.61 s	1.57 s	2.64 s	34.0 in (0.86 m)	10 ft 2 in (3.10 m)
All values from NFL Combine

Ellington ran a 4.61 40-yard dash at the NFL Scouting Combine, considerably slower than many anticipated, as he had multiple runs of over twenty yards during his final year at Clemson.

=== Arizona Cardinals ===
After being projected as a second or third round pick, he slid to the third day of the draft. He was selected in the sixth round of the 2013 NFL draft with the 187th overall pick by the Arizona Cardinals. He scored his first career touchdown on a pass reception from Carson Palmer in Week 2 of the 2013 season against the Detroit Lions. In Week 8 of the 2013 season, Ellington rushed for 154 yards against the Atlanta Falcons, the highest rushing total of the week. He finished his rookie season with 652 rushing yards on 118 attempts (5.5 avg) and three touchdowns, and also caught 39 passes for 371 yards and a touchdown.

Ellington was placed on season ending injured reserve after Week 14 of 2014, having injured his hip. He recorded 201 carries for 660 rushing yards and three rushing touchdowns while averaging only 3.3 yards per carry. In addition, he had 46 receptions for 395 receiving yards and two receiving touchdowns.

After the additions of running backs Chris Johnson and David Johnson, Ellington's role in the Arizona offense was severely reduced in 2015. He did make good use of his time on the field by recording 289 rushing yards and three touchdowns on 45 carries to average an astonishing 6.4 yards per carry. In Week 10 against the Seattle Seahawks, Ellington rushed for the 48-yard game-winning touchdown. Overall, in the 2015 season, Ellington finished with 45 carries for 289 rushing yards and three rushing touchdowns to go along with 15 receptions for 148 receiving yards in ten games.

In 2016, Ellington was the Cardinals third running back behind David Johnson and Chris Johnson to start the season. He was moved up to the number two back after Chris Johnson suffered a season-ending groin injury in Week 4. Ellington ended the 2016 season playing in all 16 games rushing for 96 yards and recording 12 catches for 85 yards.

On March 13, 2017, Ellington signed a one-year contract extension with the Cardinals. On March 29, 2017, Cardinals head coach Bruce Arians announced that Ellington would be changing his position to wide receiver for the 2017 season.

On November 20, 2017, Ellington was waived by the Cardinals.

=== Houston Texans ===
On November 21, 2017, Ellington was claimed off waivers by the Houston Texans. Ellington ended the 2017 season with a cumulative 20 carries for 55 yards and a touchdown along with 39 receptions for 369 yards.

=== Tampa Bay Buccaneers ===
On February 19, 2019, Ellington signed with the Tampa Bay Buccaneers. On August 31, 2019, Ellington was released by the Buccaneers.

== Career statistics ==
=== NFL ===
Year	Team	Games		Rushing					Receiving				
Year	Team	GP	GS	Att	Yds	Avg	Lng	TD	Rec	Yds	Avg	Lng	TD
2013	ARI	15	1	118	652	5.5	80	3	39	371	9.5	38	1
2014	ARI	12	12	201	660	3.3	22	3	46	395	8.6	81	2
2015	ARI	10	2	45	289	6.4	63	3	15	148	9.9	32	0
2016	ARI	16	0	34	96	2.8	13	0	12	85	7.1	16	0
2017	ARI	8	0	15	53	3.5	14	1	33	297	9.0	24	0
2017	HOU	4	2	5	2	0.4	7	0	6	72	12.0	29	0
Total		65	17	418	1,752	4.2	80	10	151	1,368	9.1	81	3

=== College ===
Year	Team	Rushing					Receiving				
Year	Team	Att	Yds	Avg	Lng	TD	Rec	Yds	Avg	Lng	TD
2009	Clemson	68	491	7.2	55	4	11	55	5.0	12	0
2010	Clemson	118	686	5.8	71	10	12	109	9.1	22	1
2011	Clemson	223	1,178	5.3	74	11	22	109	5.0	19	0
2012	Clemson	212	1,081	5.1	68	8	14	232	16.6	52	1
Total		621	3,436	5.5	74	33	59	505	8.6	52	2

== Personal life ==
His cousin, Bruce Ellington, is a former NFL wide receiver. The two were teammates on the 2017 Texans.
