= Berkeley High School (Moncks Corner, South Carolina) =

School in Moncks Corner, South Carolina, United States

Location
- 406 West Main Street; Moncks Corner, South Carolina, Berkeley, South Carolina 29461; United States; 33.203°N 80.026°W

Information
- Type: Public high school
- Founded: 1912 (114 years ago)
- School district: Berkeley County School District
- CEEB code: 411425
- Principal: Heather Ducker
- Assistant Principal of Athletics: Brian Welch
- Staff: 98.50 (FTE)
- Grades: 9–12
- Enrollment: 1,943 (2023–2024)
- Student to teacher ratio: 19.73
- Hours in school day: 7
- Colors: Royal blue and Vegas gold
- Mascot: Staggy
- Team name: Stags
- Rivals: Summerville HS, Wando HS, Stratford HS, Cane Bay HS
- USNWR ranking: 143
- Website: www.bcsdschools.net/o/bhs

Berkeley High School is located in Moncks Corner, South Carolina, which is the county seat of Berkeley County. The school serves 1,753 students from the towns and communities of: Moncks Corner, Cordesville, Lebanon, Longridge, MacBeth, Oakley, Pimlico, Santee Circle, and Whitesville. Berkeley County's current population is approximately 221,091 with a racial composition of 64% Caucasian, 24% African American, 6% Hispanic, and 2% Asian.

Berkeley County has been one of the fastest growing communities in South Carolina. The county's growth has presented a challenge for the Berkeley County School District and Berkeley High Schools:

== Notable alumni ==
- Henry E. Brown, Jr. (class of 1953): member of the United States House of Representatives for South Carolina's 1st congressional district, 2001–2011
- Omar Brown (class of 2007): football defensive back for the Baltimore Ravens of the National Football League (NFL) since 2012; part of the Super Bowl XLVII championship Ravens team
- Mike Dingle (class of 1986): former NFL player
- Andre Ellington (class of 2008): football running back; played at Clemson University from 2009 to 2012 and in the NFL for the Arizona Cardinals since 2013
- Bruce Ellington (class of 2010): football wide receiver; played football and basketball at the University of South Carolina, 2010–2013; drafted by the San Francisco 49ers in the 4th round / pick 106 of the NFL draft
- Steven Furtick (class of 1999): Southern Baptist pastor and founder of Elevation Church in Charlotte, North Carolina; bestselling author
- Jabari Levey (class of 2002): football offensive lineman
- Demetrius McCray (class of 2009): former NFL player
- Israel Mukuamu : NFL player, transferred after his junior season
- Ryan Stewart (class of 1992): football safety; played for the Detroit Lions of the NFL, 1996–2000
- Clarence Williams (class of 1992): former NFL player
- Isaac Wright Jr. (born 1962), lawyer
- Charlamagne tha God (born 1978): an American radio presenter, television personality, and author; co-host of the nationally syndicated radio show The Breakfast Club
