= 2007 in American football =

== News ==
=== January ===
- 1 – Denver Broncos cornerback Darrent Williams is shot to death less than 12 hours after the Broncos played their final game of the 2006 season against the San Francisco 49ers. Williams and two companions, one male and one female, were shot when another vehicle pulled beside his rented limousine in downtown Denver. deadspin.com
- 1 – The Boise State Broncos defeated the Oklahoma Sooners, 43–42 (OT) in the 2007 Fiesta Bowl played in the University of Phoenix Stadium in Glendale, Arizona. Following the game Boise State's Ian Johnson proposed to his girlfriend. fiestabowl.org
- 8 – The Florida Gators upend the previously number-one-ranked Ohio State Buckeyes 41–14 in the 2007 BCS National Championship Game at the University of Phoenix Stadium in Glendale, Arizona. The win made the University of Florida the first school to hold the NCAA Division I men's basketball title and the NCAA Division I football title at the same time.
- 13 – The Indianapolis Colts defeat the Baltimore Ravens 15–6 to reach their conference final. The New Orleans Saints reach their conference final after beating the Philadelphia Eagles 27–24. superbowl.com
- 14 – The Chicago Bears qualify for their conference final versus the New Orleans Saints as they beat the defending champions Seattle Seahawks 27–24 after overtime. The New England Patriots claim the final conferences final spot after beating the San Diego Chargers 24–21 to meet the Indianapolis Colts. superbowl.com
- 21 – The Chicago Bears defeat the New Orleans Saints 39–14, while the Indianapolis Colts defeat the New England Patriots 38–34, earning their spots in the Super Bowlsuperbowl.com
- 25 – Former track and field athlete Dwain Chambers joins the Amsterdam Admirals training campaign in Florida to aim for a career as an American football player in the NFL Europa. nfleurope.com

=== February ===
- 4 – The Indianapolis Colts beat the Chicago Bears 29–17 to win Super Bowl XLI at Dolphin Stadium (home field of host team Miami Dolphins) in Miami Gardens, Florida.

=== May ===
- 28 – Marquise Hill, a defensive end for the New England Patriots, died in his hometown of New Orleans after falling off a jet ski without a personal flotation device.

=== June ===
- 29 – The NFL announces that NFL Europa ceases operations with immediate effect.

=== July ===
- 13 – In the IAFL, the University of Limerick Vikings defeat the Cork Admirals in Shamrock Bowl XXI 22–14.

=== September ===
- 1 – The Mountaineers of Appalachian State defeat the fifth-ranked Michigan Wolverines 34–32 at the Big House, the first time a team ranked in the Top 25 of the AP Poll has been defeated by a team in Division I-AA.

=== November ===
- 13 – The Big 12 Conference fines Texas Tech Red Raiders coach Mike Leach US$10,000, the largest fine in the league's history, for negative comments he made following the game against the Texas Longhorns.

== NFL ==
=== NFL draft ===
The 2007 NFL Draft took place in New York City on April 28 and 29. The draft was televised for the 28th consecutive year on ESPN and ESPN2. The venue for the event was the Radio City Music Hall.

== NFL Europa ==
=== World Bowl ===
World Bowl XV was NFL Europa's 2007 championship game. It was played at the Commerzbank-Arena in Frankfurt, Germany on Saturday, June 23, where Hamburg defeated Frankfurt 37–28.

== NCAA ==
=== BCS National Championship Game ===
The BCS National Championship Game for the 2006 season was played on January 8 at the University of Phoenix Stadium. The BCS No. 1 Ohio State Buckeyes lost 41–14 to the BCS No. 2 Florida Gators.

== Pro Football Hall of Fame ==
- Class of 2007:
  - Gene Hickerson, player
  - Michael Irvin, player
  - Bruce Matthews, player
  - Charlie Sanders, player
  - Thurman Thomas, player
  - Roger Wehrli, player

Preceded by 2006 in American football	American football, by year 2007	Succeeded by 2008 in American football
