= Omar Brown (defensive back, born 1988) =

American football player (born 1988)

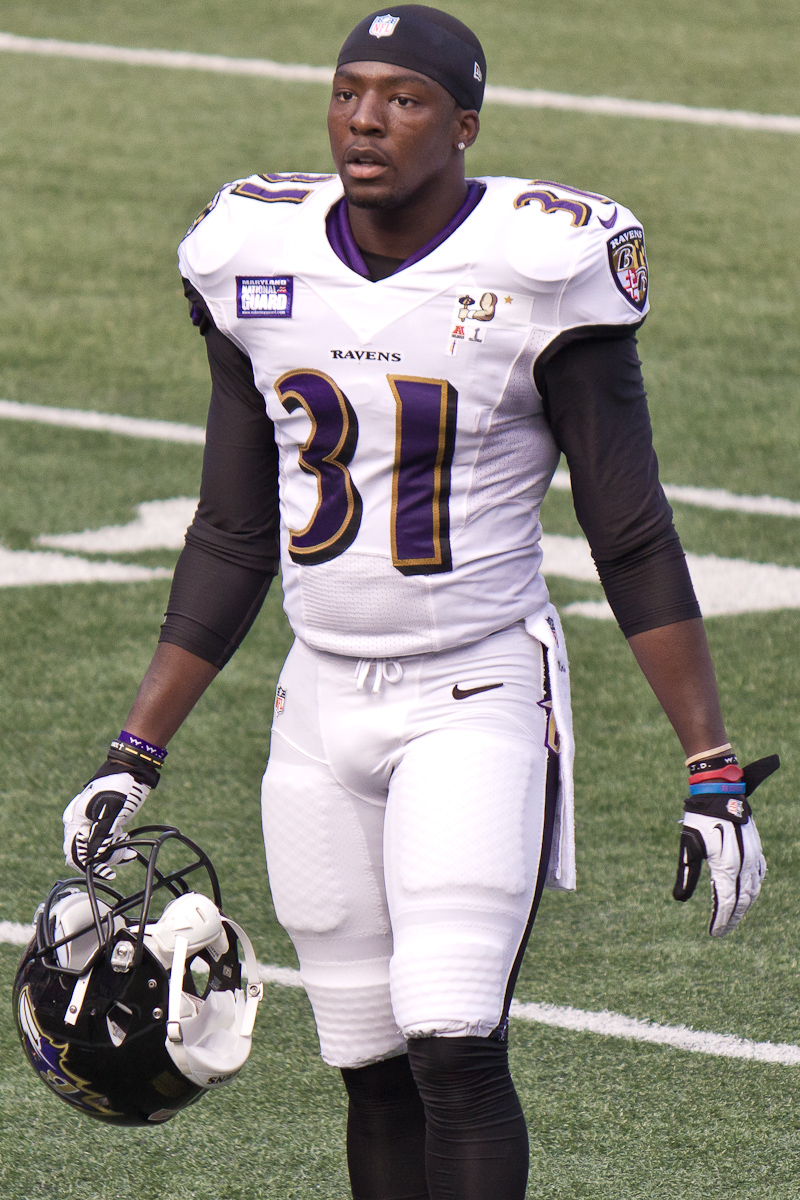
- Brown with the Baltimore Ravens in 2013

No. 38, 31
- Position: Safety

Personal information
- Born: June 6, 1988 (age 38); Moncks Corner, South Carolina, U.S.
- Listed height: 5 ft 11 in (1.80 m)
- Listed weight: 195 lb (88 kg)

Career information
- High school: Berkeley (Moncks Corner)
- College: Marshall
- NFL draft: 2012: undrafted

Career history
- Baltimore Ravens (2012–2013)

Awards and highlights
- Super Bowl champion (XLVII); First-team All-C-USA (2011)

Career NFL statistics
- Total tackles: 3
- Sacks: 1
- Fumble recoveries: 1
- Stats at Pro Football Reference

Omar Brown (born June 6, 1988) is an American former professional football player who was a safety for the Baltimore Ravens of the National Football League (NFL). Brown signed with the Ravens as an undrafted free agent after playing college football for the Marshall Thundering Herd.

== Early life ==
Brown was an All-state selection while at Berkeley High School of Moncks Corner, South Carolina. He was selected for All-Lowcountry Defensive Back of the Year.

== College career ==
Brown played college football at Marshall University. He finished college football with 288 tackles, 9 interceptions, 29 passes defended and 5 forced fumbles.

In his freshman year, Brown recorded 14 tackles, one pass defended and a forced fumble for the season.

In his sophomore year, Brown recorded 73 tackles, 2 interceptions and 12 passes defended for the season.

In his junior year, Brown finished the season with 88 tackles, 3 interceptions and 8 passes defended. On September 10, 2010, Brown had 11 tackles against 23rd ranked West Virginia but Marshall lost the game 24–21.

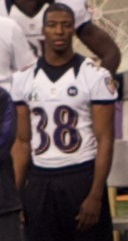
Brown on sidelines during SB XLVII

In his senior year, Brown finished the season with 113 tackles, 4 interceptions, 8 passes defended and 4 forced fumbles. On September 4, 2011, In the season opener against West Virginia he recorded 5 tackles in the game as Marshall lost 34–13. On September 10, 2011, he recorded 8 tackles and a forced fumble against Southern Mississippi as Marshall won the game 26–20. On September 17, 2011, In a regular season game against Ohio in which Brown had a team-leading 14 tackles and a pass deflection but Marshall lost the game 44–7. On September 24, 2011, he had a team-leading 17 tackles, one pass defended and a forced fumble against 13th ranked Virginia Tech as Marshall lost 30–10. In the next game against Louisville on October 1, 2011, he had 4 tackles, an interception, and a pass deflection.

== Professional career ==
Pre-draft measurables
Height	Weight	40-yard dash	10-yard split	20-yard split	20-yard shuttle	Three-cone drill	Vertical jump	Broad jump	Bench press
5 ft 10 5/8 in (1.79 m)	192 lb (87 kg)	4.73 s	1.70 s	2.72 s	4.34 s	7.25 s	38.0 in (0.97 m)	10 ft 11 in (3.33 m)	13 reps
All values from Pro Day

On May 11, 2012, Brown signed with the Baltimore Ravens as an undrafted free agent. On August 31, 2012, he was released. On September 1, 2012, he re-signed with the Baltimore Ravens to join the practice squad. On November 13, 2012, he was released from the practice squad to make room for quarterback Dennis Dixon. On November 20, he was re-signed to join the team's practice squad after doing a tryout for the Philadelphia Eagles. On December 12, 2012, he was promoted to the active roster from the practice squad. On December 23, 2012, in week 16 vs. the New York Giants, he recorded his first career sack on quarterback Eli Manning. He was promoted from the practice squad to the 53 man roster, taking the place of veteran Michael Huff who was waived by the team on October 30, 2013. The Ravens released Brown on August 25, 2014.

== Personal life ==
He is the son of Estella Mckelvey and has two brothers named Kory Brown and Evan McKelvey who also played college football. Kory played both safety and linebacker at The University of Kentucky and Evan played linebacker at Marshall University.
