= Adrien Clarke =

American football player (born 1981)

No. 61, 63
- Position: Guard

Personal information
- Born: March 26, 1981 (age 45); Cleveland, Ohio, U.S.
- Listed height: 6 ft 5 in (1.96 m)
- Listed weight: 330 lb (150 kg)

Career information
- High school: Shaker Heights (OH)
- College: Ohio State
- NFL draft: 2004: 7th round, 227th overall pick

Career history
- Philadelphia Eagles (2004–2005); New York Jets (2007); Baltimore Ravens (2008)*; Florida Tuskers (2010); Virginia Destroyers (2011)
- * Offseason or practice squad member only

Awards and highlights
- UFL champion (2011); BCS national champion (2002)
- Stats at Pro Football Reference

Adrien Carlton Clarke (born March 26, 1981) is an American former professional football guard. He was selected by the Philadelphia Eagles in the seventh round of the 2004 NFL draft. He played college football at Ohio State.

Clarke was also a member of the New York Jets, Baltimore Ravens, Florida Tuskers, and Virginia Destroyers.

== College career ==
Clarke played college football for the Ohio State Buckeyes and started in 43 games in his career. Following the 2003 season, he was invited to play in the 2004 Senior Bowl. He also won the 2002 national championship against Miami.

== Professional career ==
=== Philadelphia Eagles ===
Clarke was selected by the Philadelphia Eagles in the seventh round (227th overall) of the 2004 NFL draft. He was signed to a four-year contract on July 15, 2004. He was placed on the injured reserve list at the beginning of the 2004 season after suffering a torn hamstring.

Clarke made his first NFL start in week 12 of the 2005 season, replacing injured left guard Artis Hicks. He started in four games total in 2005.

Clarke was waived/injured on August 29, 2006, due to a back injury that required surgery.

=== New York Jets ===
Clarke was signed by the New York Jets to a reserve/future contract on January 22, 2007. Clarke earned the starting left guard job in the preseason and started in 14 games in 2007.

He was waived on February 26, 2008.

=== Baltimore Ravens ===
On May 16, 2008, Clarke was signed by the Baltimore Ravens, but was released on August 30.

=== Florida Tuskers ===
Clarke was drafted by the Florida Tuskers of the United Football League in the sixth round (29th overall) of the 2010 UFL draft. He started the 2010 season at right guard and was resigned in 2011 and will go into camp as the incumbent right guard for the now Virginia Destroyers.
