= John Allen (American football) =

American football coach and player

Current position
- Title: Wide receivers coach
- Team: Tennessee Tech
- Conference: OVC

Playing career
- 1991–1994: James Madison
- Position: Wide receiver

Coaching career (HC unless noted)
- 1996–2001: Lock Haven (assistant)
- 2002: Bucknell (assistant)
- 2003: Berlin Thunder (WR)
- 2004–2006: Amsterdam Admirals (OC)
- 2007: Berlin Thunder
- 2011–2014: Lock Haven
- 2015–2016: Delaware State (OC/QB)
- 2017: Delaware State (QB)
- 2018–2019: Old Dominion (WR)
- 2020–2021: Louisiana Tech (OWR)
- 2022: UConn (WR/PGC)
- 2024–present: Tennessee Tech (WR)

Administrative career (AD unless noted)
- 2008–2010: Penn State (player personnel)

Head coaching record
- Overall: 5–37 (college); 2–8 (NFL Europe)

John Allen is an American football coach and former player. He served as the head football coach at Lock Haven University of Pennsylvania from 2011 to 2015, compiling a record of 5–37 in five seasons. Allen was also the head coach of the Berlin Thunder of NFL Europe in 2007, tallying a mark of 2–8. He played college football as a wide receiver at James Madison University.

== Playing career ==
Allen played college football at James Madison University. A three-year starter at James Madison, he was a wide receiver and punt returner for the Dukes and was a captain his senior season.

== Coaching career ==
Allen's first season in NFL Europa league was in 2003 when he served as wide receivers coach of Thunder. His year with them was Allen's first on the professional coaching level, having previously enjoyed successful jobs at Bucknell University (2002) and Lock Haven University, where he worked for six years, rising to the position of offensive coordinator.

His influence on Berlin Thunder was clearly visible in 2003 as seven of his receivers caught 15 passes or more and Berlin scored 20 times on touchdown passes to rank overall second in the NFL Europa League. When Allen moved on to another NFL Europa team in 2004, the Amsterdam Admirals, he guided Amsterdam's offense to second in the league’s offensive rankings, averaging 316.6 yards per game. Furthermore, two of the top three positions in receiving yards were occupied by Admiral players. In 2005 Amsterdam went one better under Allen's guidance and supervision and established NFL Europa's most potent attack, averaging no less than 357.4 yards and 25.1 points per game.

In 2006 the Admirals once again led the league with 25.9 points per game and ranked second in total offense, averaging 332.3 yards game.

Allen served as Coordinator of Player Personnel & Development at Penn State University from 2008 to 2010.

On March 7, 2011, Allen was named as the new head coach of Lock Haven University football.

== Head coaching record ==
=== College ===
Year	Team	Overall	Conference	Standing	Bowl/playoffs
Lock Haven Bald Eagles (Pennsylvania State Athletic Conference) (2011–2014)
2011	Lock Haven	0–10	0–7	8th (West)	
2012	Lock Haven	1–9	0–7	8th (West)	
2013	Lock Haven	3–8	2–5	6th (East)	
2014	Lock Haven	2–9	2–7	6th (East)	
Lock Haven:		6–36	4–26		
Total:		6–36			

=== Professional ===
Year	Team	Overall	Conference	Standing	Bowl/playoffs
Berlin Thunder (NFL Europe) (2007)
2007	Berlin Thunder	2–8		6th	
Berlin Thunder:		2–8			
Total:		2–8			
