= Bruce Ellington =

American football player (born 1991)

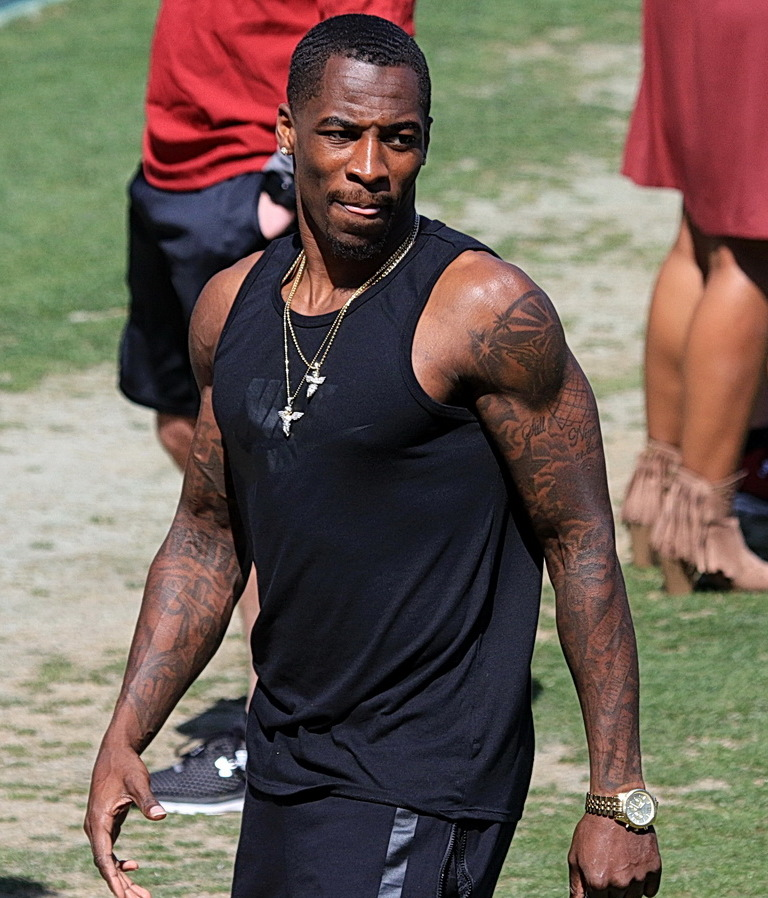
- Ellington in 2016

No. 10, 12
- Position: Wide receiver

Personal information
- Born: August 22, 1991 (age 35); Moncks Corner, South Carolina, U.S.
- Listed height: 5 ft 9 in (1.75 m)
- Listed weight: 200 lb (91 kg)

Career information
- High school: Berkeley (Moncks Corner)
- College: South Carolina
- NFL draft: 2014: 4th round, 106th overall pick

Career history
- San Francisco 49ers (2014–2016); New York Jets (2017)*; Houston Texans (2017–2018); Detroit Lions (2018); New England Patriots (2019)*
- * Offseason or practice squad member only

Career NFL statistics
- Receptions: 79
- Receiving yards: 769
- Rushing yards: 54
- Return yards: 1,651
- Total touchdowns: 6
- Stats at Pro Football Reference

Bruce Ellington (born August 22, 1991) is an American former professional football player who was a wide receiver in the National Football League (NFL). He played college football for the South Carolina Gamecocks and was selected by the San Francisco 49ers in the fourth round of the 2014 NFL draft.

== Early life ==
In high school, Ellington played both basketball and football at Moncks Corner (SC) Berkeley located in Moncks Corner, South Carolina. Ellington attended the same high school as his cousin, Andre Ellington. In 2009, Ellington played quarterback and led the Stags to the Division II-AAAA state championship in 2009 as a quarterback for head coach Jerry Brown. In the 2009 state championship game, Ellington rushed for four touchdowns. Ellington was a finalist for South Carolina's "Mr. Football" as well. On the hardwood as a senior, Ellington averaged 22 points, eight rebounds, and six assists per game and was named the South Carolina Coaches Association 4A Player of the Year, the Region 7-4A Player of the Year, and the Post and Courier Athlete of the Year. Ellington was a McDonald's All-America nominee following his senior season. As a basketball recruit, Ellington was rated as a four-star recruit by ESPN (93 overall rating) and a four-star recruit by Rivals (24th-ranked point guard and 96th-ranked player overall). As a football recruit, ESPN rated Ellington as a four-star recruit as well and listed him as an athlete.

== College career ==
Ellington played both basketball and football at the University of South Carolina. After playing only basketball in the 2010 season, he joined the football team in 2011 and played both sports throughout his college career. As a football player, he had 106 career receptions for 1,586 yards and 16 touchdowns. As a basketball player, he averaged 11.2 points, 2.7 rebounds, three assists, and one steal per game.

Ellington announced on January 3, 2014, that he would forgo his senior season and enter the 2014 NFL draft. Although Ellington would forgo his senior season, he was still able to graduate with a degree in sociology during the 3 and 1/2 years that he was at the University of South Carolina.

== Professional career ==
Pre-draft measurables
Height	Weight	Arm length	Hand span	40-yard dash	10-yard split	20-yard split	20-yard shuttle	Three-cone drill	Vertical jump	Broad jump	Bench press
5 ft 9 3/8 in (1.76 m)	197 lb (89 kg)	31 in (0.79 m)	9 5/8 in (0.24 m)	4.45 s	1.55 s	2.58 s	3.95 s	6.69 s	39.5 in (1.00 m)	10 ft 0 in (3.05 m)	15 reps
All values from NFL Combine

=== San Francisco 49ers ===
The San Francisco 49ers selected Ellington in the fourth round (106th overall) of the 2014 NFL draft. He was the 17th wide receiver selected in 2014.

On May 27, 2014, the 49ers signed Ellington to a four-year, $2.69 million contract that included a signing bonus of $474,428. He caught his first career touchdown on a 20-yard reception from quarterback Blaine Gabbert against the Denver Broncos on October 19. On December 20, Ellington had two touchdowns against the San Diego Chargers, an eight-yard touchdown pass from quarterback Colin Kaepernick and a one-yard touchdown run, giving him three touchdowns in his rookie season.

In the 2015 season, Ellington finished with 13 receptions for 153 receiving yards in 13 games.

The 49ers placed him on injured reserve due to a hamstring injury on August 30, 2016.

On August 3, 2017, Ellington was waived by the 49ers.

=== New York Jets ===
On August 3, 2017, Ellington was claimed off waivers by the New York Jets. He was waived on August 5, after failing his physical.

=== Houston Texans ===
On August 11, 2017, Ellington signed with the Houston Texans.On September 10, Ellington made his Texans debut in a 29–7 loss to the Jacksonville Jaguars. He was placed on injured reserve on December 5. In 11 games with the Texans, Ellington had 29 catches for 330 yards and two touchdowns.

On March 14, 2018, Ellington signed a one-year contract to remain with the Texans. He was placed on injured reserve on September 25, with a hamstring injury. On October 31, Ellington was released by the Texans.

=== Detroit Lions ===
On November 6, 2018, Ellington was signed by the Detroit Lions. He was placed on injured reserve on December 22. Overall, Ellington finished the 2018 season with 31 receptions for 224 yards and one touchdown. On February 15, 2019, Ellington was released by the Lions.

=== New England Patriots ===
On March 14, 2019, Ellington signed a one-year contract with the New England Patriots. He was released by the Patriots on May 8, with an injury designation.

== Personal life ==
His cousin Andre Ellington is a former NFL running back. The two were teammates on the 2017 Texans.
