= Expedition Impossible (TV series) =

- Title card
- Genre: Reality
- Created by: Mark Burnett
- Presented by: Dave Salmoni
- Country of origin: United States
- Original language: English
- No. of seasons: 1
- No. of episodes: 10

Production
- Production location: Morocco
- Production company: Mark Burnett Productions

Original release
- Network: ABC
- Release: June 23 – August 25, 2011

Expedition Impossible is a 2011 American reality television series. The series follows thirteen teams of three competitors as they "solve problems while racing across deserts, over mountains and through rivers" across the nation of Morocco. The first team to cross the finish line after completing the ten stages of the competition was to receive US$150,000. In addition, each team member won a new Ford Explorer.

Created by producer Mark Burnett and hosted by wildlife expert Dave Salmoni, the series premiered on ABC on June 23, 2011, to mild critical response. The show was canceled following its first and only season.

== Game ==
Expedition Impossible is run in ten stages, each of which has a series of checkpoints. At each checkpoint, teams receive instructions on how to reach the next checkpoint and at some checkpoints they face challenges that must be completed before heading to the next checkpoint. The last team in each stage to reach the final checkpoint is eliminated. If any member of a team quits, the team is eliminated.

The competition began in Merzouga and concluded in Marrakesh, covering a course of around 2,000 miles including treks through the Sahara Desert and over the Atlas Mountains.

== Production ==
ABC and producer Mark Burnett announced the series on November 4, 2010, with Burnett describing Expedition Impossible as "high adventure television" and "an epic Indiana Jones-style experience". Open casting began later that month. Prospective contestants were required to demonstrate proficiency in several skills, including horseback riding, righting a boat that had been capsized, compass reading and rappelling.

After initially announcing a premiere date of June 21, 2011, ABC revised the date to June 23.

== International distribution and adaptations ==
On May 9, 2011, CTV Television Network announced that it had acquired Expedition Impossible for Canadian broadcast and that it would debut the series on June 21. CTV pushed back the premiere to the 23rd, corresponding with its American debut.

On July 16, 2011, Australia's Network Ten started to broadcast the show in the 6:30pm – 7:30pm timeslot on its main channel - 10.

An adaptation of the series premiered on the channel Cuatro in Spain on January 23, 2013. Hosted by Raquel Sánchez-Silva, Expedición Imposible features ten pairs of celebrities racing through Morocco.

== Teams ==
=== The Gypsies ===
John Post, 25, Pensacola Beach, FL. Sustainable Farmer
Taylor Filasky, 31, San Diego, CA. Video Producer
Eric Bach, 26, San Francisco, CA. Entrepreneur

Group of friends that, collectively, have traveled to over 40 countries.

=== No Limits ===
Erik Weihenmayer, 42, Golden, CO. Motivational Speaker/Writer
Jeff Evans, 41, Boulder, CO. Motivational Speaker/Physician Assistant
Aaron "Ike" Isaacson, 33, Topeka, KS. Soldier

Jeff is Erik's climbing guide on mountaineering expeditions because Erik is blind. Ike is a soldier.

=== Fab 3 ===
Ryan Allen Carrillo, 36, Los Angeles, CA. Unemployed
Kari Gibson, 26, Los Angeles, CA. Model
AJ Gibson, 30, Los Angeles, CA. Mortgage Consultant

Kari and AJ are siblings. Ryan and AJ used to be a couple, but are now friends. All three are roommates.

=== The Football Players ===
Akbar Gbaja-Biamila, 31, Los Angeles, CA. Broadcaster
Robert Ortiz, 27, Solana Beach, CA. Business Owner
Ricky Sharpe, 31, Costa Mesa, CA. Health and Fitness Consultant

All three are former professional football players who first met while playing for San Diego State University.

=== The Cops ===
Robert "Rob" Robillard, 43, Concord, MA. Police Lieutenant
Dani Henderson, 34, Marlborough, MA. Police Officer
James "Jim" Vaglica, 49, Billerica, MA. Police Sergeant

Cops who work together. In 2016, Jim Vaglica of The Cops would appear on the FOX reality show, American Grit.

=== California Girls ===
Christina Chin, 24, Davis, CA. Corporate PR.
Brittany Smith, 24, Rancho Murieta, CA. Aspiring Pro Golfer
Natalie Smith, 25, Woodland, CA. Teacher/Coach

Friends who met while attending the University of California, Davis.

=== The Country Boys ===
Nicholas Coughlin, 28, Clinton, MS. Internet Marketing/Entrepreneur
Jason Cronin, 37, Pensacola Beach, FL. Business Owner/Entrepreneur
Chad Robinson, 27, Bolton, MS. Real Estate Investor

Friends coming from Mississippi and nearby.

=== The Fishermen ===
Gus Sanfilippo, 48, Gloucester, MA. Fisherman
Nino Sanfilippo, 43, Gloucester, MA. Fisherman
Joe Sanfilippo, 44, Gloucester, MA. Fisherman

Gus and Nino are brothers and Joe is their cousin. All three are crew on the fishing boat Captain Dominic.

=== New York Firemen ===
Kevin "Fathead" Coursey, 39, Belle Harbor, NY. Firefighter
Rob Keiley, 34, Rockaway Park, NY. Firefighter
Mike Egan, 34, Rockaway Park, NY. Firefighter

Co-workers who are firefighters in New York

=== Team Kansas ===
Lindsey Haymond, 27, Houston, TX. Teacher
Kelsey Fuller, 22, Overland Park, KS. Student
Mackenzie Fuller, 18, Overland Park, KS. Student

Three sisters who are originally from Kansas.

=== Grandpa's Warriors ===
Dick Smith, 69, Normal, IL. Store Owner
Steven Smith, 48, Savoy, IL. Store Owner
Samantha Smith-Gibbs, 23, Thomasboro, IL. Store Manager

Samantha is Steven's daughter, Dick is Steven's father.

=== Mom's Army ===
Eleanor "Ellie" Vanderbeck, 52, Reading, PA. Bookkeeper
Ruthie Vanderbeck, 28, Reading, PA. Realtor
Abbie Vanderbeck, 30, Norwalk, CT. Nanny

Ruthie and Abbie are Ellie's daughters. They were also in the military.

=== Latin Persuasion ===
Dashia Imperiale, 44, New York, NY. Fitness Instructor
Raven Garcia, 30, Bronx, NY. Freelance Writer
Mai Reyes, 38, New York, NY. Manager

Friends and co-workers, all with Latino heritage.

== Progress ==
Team	Relationships	Contestants	Position											Finish
Team	Relationships	Contestants	1	2	3	4	5	6	7	8	9	10	11	Finish
The Gypsies	Travel Friends	John	1st	1st	1st	1st	2nd	1st	1st	1st	1st	1st	1st	1st
The Gypsies	Travel Friends	Taylor	1st	1st	1st	1st	2nd	1st	1st	1st	1st	1st	1st	1st
The Gypsies	Travel Friends	Eric	1st	1st	1st	1st	2nd	1st	1st	1st	1st	1st	1st	1st
No Limits	Friends	Ike	6th	3rd	2nd	2nd	5th	3rd	2nd	5th	4th	3rd	2nd	4th
No Limits	Friends	Jeff	6th	3rd	2nd	2nd	5th	3rd	2nd	5th	4th	3rd	2nd	5th
No Limits	Friends	Erik	6th	3rd	2nd	2nd	5th	3rd	2nd	5th	4th	3rd	2nd	6th
Fab 3	Roommates	Kari	2nd	5th	5th	8th	1st	2nd	6th	3rd	2nd	2nd	3rd	7th
Fab 3	Roommates	AJ	2nd	5th	5th	8th	1st	2nd	6th	3rd	2nd	2nd	3rd	8th
Fab 3	Roommates	Ryan	2nd	5th	5th	8th	1st	2nd	6th	3rd	2nd	2nd	3rd	9th
The Football Players	Football Players	Robert	3rd	4th	4th	3rd	3rd	4th	4th	2nd	3rd	4th		10th
The Football Players	Football Players	Ricky	3rd	4th	4th	3rd	3rd	4th	4th	2nd	3rd	4th		11th
The Football Players	Football Players	Akbar	3rd	4th	4th	3rd	3rd	4th	4th	2nd	3rd	4th		12th
The Cops	Co-workers/Cops	Rob R.	10th	11th	8th	5th	4th	6th	5th	4th	5th			13th
The Cops	Co-workers/Cops	Dani	10th	11th	8th	5th	4th	6th	5th	4th	5th			14th
The Cops	Co-workers/Cops	Jim	10th	11th	8th	5th	4th	6th	5th	4th	5th			15th
California Girls	College Friends	Natalie	9th	9th	7th	7th	8th	7th	3rd	6th				16th
California Girls	College Friends	Brittany	9th	9th	7th	7th	8th	7th	3rd	6th				17th
California Girls	College Friends	Christina	9th	9th	7th	7th	8th	7th	3rd	6th				18th
The Country Boys	Friends	Jason	7th	2nd	3rd	9th	7th	5th	7th					19th
The Country Boys	Friends	Nicholas	7th	2nd	3rd	9th	7th	5th	7th					20th
The Country Boys	Friends	Chad	7th	2nd	3rd	9th	7th	5th	7th					21st
The Fishermen	Brothers & Cousin	Gus	5th	6th	10th	6th	6th	8th						22nd
The Fishermen	Brothers & Cousin	Joe	5th	6th	10th	6th	6th	8th						23rd
The Fishermen	Brothers & Cousin	Nino	5th	6th	10th	6th	6th	8th						24th
New York Firemen	Co-workers/Firefighters	Rob K.	8th	10th	6th	4th	9th							25th
New York Firemen	Co-workers/Firefighters	"Fathead"	8th	10th	6th	4th	9th							26th
New York Firemen	Co-workers/Firefighters	Mike	8th	10th	6th	4th	9th							27th
Team Kansas	Sisters	Kelsey	4th	7th	9th	10th								28th
Team Kansas	Sisters	Lindsey	4th	7th	9th	10th								29th
Team Kansas	Sisters	Mackenzie	4th	7th	9th	10th								30th
Grandpa's Warriors	Family	Steven	12th	8th	11th									31st
Grandpa's Warriors	Family	Samantha	12th	8th	11th									32nd
Grandpa's Warriors	Family	Dick	12th	8th	11th									33rd
Mom's Army	Mother & Daughters	Abbie	11th	12th										34th
Mom's Army	Mother & Daughters	Ruthie	11th	12th										35th
Mom's Army	Mother & Daughters	Ellie	11th	12th										36th
Latin Persuasion	Friends & Co-workers	Raven	13th											37th
Latin Persuasion	Friends & Co-workers	Mai	13th											38th
Latin Persuasion	Friends & Co-workers	Dashia	13th											39th

- A red team placement means the team was eliminated.
- A green team placement means the team won the expedition.

== Stages ==
No.	Title	Winner	Original release date	US viewers (millions)
1	"Sun! Sand! Sahara!"	The Gypsies	June 23, 2011	7.18
Checkpoint one: Teams must traverse a tall sand dune to reach a camel outpost. Checkpoint two: Teams select three camels to carry them to the Lone Palm Camp.: Challenge: "Find water the local way." Teams must fill one jug with water obtained using traditional Berber collection methods.; Checkpoint three: Teams leave the camels and proceed on foot to Todra mountain.: Challenge: Rappel 300 feet into Todra Gorge.; Checkpoint four: Teams travel on foot to Snake Valley.: Challenge: Teams watch a snake charming routine and count the number of snakes, selecting a box bearing the number of snakes they see to receive directions to the finish line. If they select a box with an incorrect number, they are sent 30 minutes off course and must repeat the challenge.; Finish line
2	"Light My Way!"	The Gypsies	June 30, 2011	6.16
Checkpoint one: Teams travel to a horse outpost on foot, then ride Arabian horses seven miles to a kasbah.: Challenge: Search for buckets and use them to fill an urn to receive the next set of instructions. Teams could choose a larger bucket that leaked or a smaller bucket that did not.; Checkpoint two: Each team member paddles an inflatable kayak four miles down-river.: Challenge: Search through the village craftsman's dwelling to find a traditional lamp which will illuminate the finish line on a map.; Finish line: Travel two miles to an old bridge and search for the finish line at a hidden campsite.
3	"I Don't Know How to Ride This Thing!"	The Gypsies	July 7, 2011	5.65
Checkpoint one: Walk to an oasis and gather feed for camels. Trek 1.5 miles to a camel outpost.: Challenge: Trade feed for camels.; Checkpoint two: Travel 3.8 miles with the camels to an olive mill.: Challenge: Collect six olive barrels and carry them on the camels to a lake. Build a raft using the barrels to reach an island kasbah. Then paddle another mile to Shamil Cove into the overnight camp.; Checkpoint three: Travel 3.5 miles on the Dadès River to a "castle beach" with ancient timber poles.: Challenge: Wrap a scroll around a pole to reveal the code to unlock the clue for the next trek.; Finish line: Choose a shorter, harder route through the mountains or a longer, easier route along the river to reach the finish line.
4	"There's Snow in Morocco?"	The Gypsies	July 14, 2011	4.82
Checkpoint one: Ascend the Atlas Mountains along a high ridgeline to a 10,000-foot high bluff.: Challenge: Unravel and tie together the cord bracelets each team was given to create one long fishing line. Teams must attach a hook and use the line to capture cages that are scattered on the bluff below. Inside the cage is a key that unlocks the next set of instructions.; Checkpoint two: After spending the night at an Alpine Base Camp, teams travel west out of the mountains to a dirt road that leads to a farming village.: Challenge: Select a farming plow and transport it via mule up two-plus miles of switchbacks to a teahouse.; Checkpoint three: Load the plow into the back of a Ford Explorer, then drive to the Farming Terraces.: Challenge: Assemble the plow to dig up instructions in the farming field that lead to the finish.; Finish line: Walk down a mountain road to reach the finish line.
5	"A Blind Man's Nightmare"	Fab 3	July 21, 2011	4.68
Checkpoint one: Proceed to an artist's tent where someone must duplicate a map on the body part of a teammate. Teams then use the map to navigate six miles into the Atlas Mountains to a 200 foot high cliff overlooking the Petrified Canyon.: Challenge: Rappel down the cliff.; Checkpoint two: Traverse the Petrified Canyon pass to a riverbed location.: Challenge: Comb through the riverbed to find a rock with a fish fossil. Teams must then trade in the fossil at a local market for a fish dinner.; Checkpoint three: After solving a puzzle with instructions on how to get to the next checkpoint, teams hike five miles up the river.: Challenge: Teams must use their fingers to extract a key from a Moroccan mountain register. Inside they find the rappel rope they need to get to a riverbed below.; Finish line
6	"Leap of Faith"	The Gypsies	July 28, 2011	5.13
Checkpoint one: Use a hand-line to cross a river before heading into town to find a local rug stall.: Challenge: Locate a rug with five holes in it. Then place the rug on the correct local sign to reveal the location of the next checkpoint.; Checkpoint two: Proceed on foot to the Ouzoud Falls.: Challenge: Teams opt to either jump off a 30 foot cliff into the water and wade across the river, or climb down some ropes to take the slow way down.; Checkpoint three: Zip-line across a river to receive the next set of instructions.: Challenge: Unlock a set of paddles by memorizing a symbol on the lock. Then swim to a nearby cave to look for the matching symbol with the attached key to unlock the paddles.; Finish line: After kayaking down some rapids, teams use their GPS to navigate to a goat cave. From there, teams are able to spot the flags at the camp. They must go back down the mountain, paddle another mile and then climb 300 feet to the finish.
7	"Rock the Kasbah"	The Gypsies	August 4, 2011	4.82
Checkpoint one: From the tower of a kasbah, use binoculars to spot a symbol on the city that matches one of the six symbols given on the map. Then, drive to that place: a souk.: Challenge: Search for the correct stall to obtain the clue to the next checkpoint.; Checkpoint two: Drive to the airport.: Challenge: Select a team member to board an airplane to skydive. While skydiving, the member needs to spot a symbol on the ground leading to the next checkpoint.; Checkpoint three: Swim across a river, then trek for one mile to arrive at the next checkpoint.: Challenge: Solve the puzzle on the activity sign that will reveal the location of the finish line. Teams can choose to stay and solve the puzzle, or trek for another two extra miles to get a clue on how to solve the puzzle.; Finish line: After solving the puzzle which spelled out the word "kasbah" (an acronym of the six signs on the sign board – kayaking, archery, swimming, boating, airplane, hiking), teams race to the kasbah.
8	"Never Give Up"	The Gypsies	August 11, 2011	3.83
Checkpoint one: Teams head up to the ancient kasbah.: Challenge: Rappel down the side of the kasbah mountain, then trek to the shore of Lake Bin el-Ouidane for the next clue.; Checkpoint two: Inflate two kayaks and paddle to Prison Island.: Challenge: Assemble a catamaran using the two kayaks, then sail to Saddle Island for their overnight camp.; Checkpoint three: After spending the night at Saddle Island, teams swim across the lake's closest gap to the mainland before hiking to the farm ruins.: Challenge: Using two poles and a chain, teams navigate through the field by answering a series of questions. Each correct answer will give them a numerical value that correlates to a compass bearing. In the last point, they have to dig up the clue that points to the finish line.; Finish line: Travel 600 yards to the finish line.
9	"Come Hell or High Water"	The Gypsies	August 18, 2011	4.45
Checkpoint one: Trek through the Tillouguit village to a river, pick a guide and a raft to navigate the Ahansai River white waters to the mule bridge.: Challenge: Solve a riddle to open the lock on a box containing food and the next set of instructions.; Checkpoint two: Return to the rafts and paddle through a river with muddy water called "The Soup". Checkpoint three: Hike across the canyon to a lakeshore, then paddle 1.5 miles to Rocky Beach using a traditional Moroccan tin boat. Checkpoint four: Trek 2 miles to Widow's Ledge.: Challenge: Rappel down to a cave. Crawl through the cave tunnels. Then, find the correct ceramic pot with the matching symbol to get the next clue.; Finish line: Go down the cliff, swim across the river, and trek to the wheat field.
10	"And Then There Were Four"	The Gypsies	August 25, 2011	4.61
Checkpoint one: Teams paddle 2 miles in Moroccan tin boats.: Challenge: Shovel a pile of rocks and shift them to find two rocks with amethyst. Trade the amethyst for horses.; Checkpoint two: Teams ride on the horses 3.5 miles to the next checkpoint. The last team to arrive will be evacuated. Teams then drive 22 miles through the desert to find the next checkpoint hidden in the crowded marketplace, Jemaa el-Fnaa, Marrakesh. Checkpoint three: Based on the clue written in Arabic, teams go to their next checkpoint, Saadian Tombs. Checkpoint four: Using the clues provided on the map given, teams navigate through the town to locate a secret entrance to an old palace prison.: Challenge: Go down to the basement to find a Moroccan wooden lock box. Teams must then open the complex puzzle box to retrieve a key. Use the key to unlock the ladder, then use it to climb up the castle walls to reveal the location of the finish line.; Finish line

== Reception ==
Before its debut, Expedition Impossible drew comparisons to other reality television series, including The Amazing Race, Pirate Master, and Burnett's own adventure race series Eco-Challenge. Burnett has repudiated the comparisons to TAR, saying "There’s no taxis. There’s no hotels. This is very, very different. Here, you actually need to put yourself on the line, really be willing to cross the deserts and the mountains and use the camels and the horses. So, it’s a very, very much more difficult competition."

David Hinckley of The New York Daily News found the premiere to follow a familiar formula and wondered whether a "saturation point" for this style of entertainment had been reached. In saying so, he stressed that he in no way was diminishing the accomplishments of the participating teams. Similarly, Brian Lowry for Variety, while calling the series a "transparent knockoff of The Amazing Race", complimented Burnett on his ability to create "a sense of jeopardy in the challenges" while finding that the series as a whole "travels such a familiar course" that it was tantamount to "recycling" the concepts of other series.

Expedition Impossible was the top-rated program the night of its debut, pulling 2.4/7 in adults 18/49 and 7.18 million viewers. The premiere was the 8th most watched show that week. In the second episode, Expedition Impossible pulled a 1.8/6 in adults 18/49 and 6.16 million viewers. This drop was not unusual for a holiday weekend, as other shows also experienced a rating decline. Despite this, Expedition Impossible was the top rated program of the hour and the second top rated program of the night, as well as the 12th most watched show that week in the 18/49 demo. Ratings however continued to slip when its fifth episode only garnered a rating of 1.3 for the 18/49 demo and 4.68 million in total viewers. The show hit a season low for its eighth episode, with a demo rating of 1.1 and only watched by 3.83 million viewers. The show's ninth episode was watched by 4.45 million viewers, and the season finale ended with a rating of 1.3 for the 18/49 demo and 4.61 millions in total viewer number.

== International versions ==
The TV format was exported in Spain with the title Expedición Imposible when it was aired on Cuatro and hosted by Raquel Sánchez Silva on 2013.
