= Chris Thompson (cornerback) =

American gridiron football player and coach (born 1982)

Profile
- Position: Defensive back

Personal information
- Born: May 19, 1982 (age 44); New Orleans, Louisiana, U.S.
- Listed height: 6 ft 0 in (1.83 m)
- Listed weight: 187 lb (85 kg)

Career information
- High school: Holy Cross (New Orleans)
- College: Nicholls State
- NFL draft: 2004: 5th round, 150th overall pick

Career history

Playing
- 2004: Jacksonville Jaguars
- 2005: Chicago Bears
- 2006: Cleveland Browns*
- 2006: Miami Dolphins*
- 2007: Berlin Thunder
- 2007: Buffalo Bills*
- 2007: Edmonton Eskimos
- 2008–2009: Hamilton Tiger-Cats
- 2010–2013: Edmonton Eskimos
- 2015: Montreal Alouettes
- * Offseason or practice squad member only

Coaching
- 2016–2020: Nicholls (CB)
- 2021–present: Holy Cross School (LA) (HJVC/S)

Awards and highlights
- 2× CFL All-Star (2008, 2010); CFL East All-Star (2008); CFL West All-Star (2010)
- Stats at Pro Football Reference
- Stats at CFL.ca

Christopher J. Thompson (born May 19, 1982) is an American former professional football cornerback who played in the National Football League (NFL) and Canadian Football League (CFL). He is currently the head junior varsity coach and safeties coach for Holy Cross School (LA).

== College career ==
Thompson played collegiately at Nicholls State University.

== Professional career ==
Pre-draft measurables
Height	Weight	Arm length	Hand span	40-yard dash	10-yard split	20-yard split	20-yard shuttle	Three-cone drill	Vertical jump	Broad jump	Bench press
6 ft 0 in (1.83 m)	189 lb (86 kg)	30 1/2 in (0.77 m)	9 in (0.23 m)	4.52 s	1.56 s	2.63 s	4.14 s	7.09 s	35.0 in (0.89 m)	9 ft 9 in (2.97 m)	12 reps
All values from NFL Combine

=== National Football League ===
Thompson began his professional playing career in the National Football League. He was selected by the Jacksonville Jaguars with the 150th overall pick in fifth round of the 2004 NFL draft and spent the 2004 NFL season with the Jaguars. He played for the Chicago Bears during the 2005 NFL season, where he appeared in twelve games and accumulated 10 tackles. Thompson played for the Cleveland Browns and Miami Dolphins during the 2006 season and was with the Buffalo Bills during training camp for the 2007 season.

=== Berlin Thunder ===
Thompson played for the Berlin Thunder during the 2007 NFL Europe season.

=== Edmonton Eskimos (first stint) ===
After being cut by the Bills, prior to the start of the 2007 NFL season, Thompson signed with the Edmonton Eskimos of the Canadian Football League. He was on their negotiation list for 2 years prior to his signing. Thompson spent his first year in the CFL with the Eskimos. He totaled 12 defensive tackles and one interception in that season.

=== Hamilton Tiger-Cats ===
Thompson was traded from Edmonton to the Hamilton Tiger-Cats on February 13, 2008. In his second year in the CFL Thompson was named a CFL All-Star. He set career highs in tackles with 60 and interceptions with 9. The following year, which was the 2009 CFL season, Thompson accumulated 49 tackles and 1 interception.

=== Edmonton Eskimos (second stint) ===
Chris Thompson returned to the Eskimos for the 2010 CFL season. He would remain on the team for the next season through the 2013 CFL season. During those 4 seasons Thompson averaged 46.7 tackles per season and totaled 19 interceptions. Following the 2013 CFL season Thompson was released by the Eskimos on March 14, 2014.

=== Montreal Alouettes ===
After not playing for the 2014 season, Thompson and the Montreal Alouettes agreed to a contract on February 20, 2015. On June 9, 2015, it was reported by Herb Zurkousky of the Montreal Gazette that Thompson was released by the Alouettes.

== Coaching career ==
In 2016, Thompson was hired as cornerbacks coach for the Nicholls Colonels football team.

In 2021, Thompson was hired as head junior varsity coach and safeties coach for the Holy Cross School Tigers football team.
