= Chris Laskowski =

American football player (born 1981)

Profile
- Position: Safety

Personal information
- Born: September 12, 1981 (age 45); Melbourne, Florida, U.S.
- Listed height: 5 ft 9 in (1.75 m)
- Listed weight: 210 lb (95 kg)

Career information
- High school: Rockledge (Rockledge, Florida)
- College: Florida Atlantic

Career history
- Indianapolis Colts (2005–2006)*; Frankfurt Galaxy (2007)
- * Offseason or practice squad member only

Christopher Anthony Laskowski (born September 12, 1981) is an American former football linebacker turned safety, with the Indianapolis Colts. In August 2006, the Colts placed him on injured reserve with a sports hernia injury, then reached an injury settlement with him and released him from the team.

== Early life ==
Laskowski attended Rockledge High School in Rockledge, Florida, and was a letterwinner in American football, wrestling and baseball. In football, he was an All-Conference honoree and an All-State honoree. In wrestling, he was twice a state qualifier. In baseball, he won All-Conference honors. Laskowski graduated from Rockledge High School in 2000.

== College career ==
As a freshman at Florida Atlantic University, he was a walk-on to the university's first football team in 2000. He was named the team Most Valuable Player (MVP) in 2002, and co-MVP in his final two years, and was invited to the Hula Bowl as a senior. In 2005, the Colts signed him as an undrafted free agent, cut him during the pre-season, and re-signed him to their practice squad. In January 2006, Laskowski was re-signed as a safety and began training camp in July.
