= Shamrock Bowl XXI =

Football match (2007 IAFL Season)

- Event: 2007 IAFL Season
UL Vikings	Cork Admirals
South	South
22	14
- Date: 29 July 2007
- Venue: UL Sports Ground, Limerick

Shamrock Bowl XXI was the 2007 championship game of the Irish American Football League (IAFL). This Shamrock Bowl hosted two teams from the IAFL South division: the University of Limerick Vikings and the Cork Admirals. It was played on July 29 at the UL Sports Ground, Limerick, following the regular 2007 IAFL season.

The game finished 22-14 to the Vikings, courtesy of three rushing touchdowns from game MVP Seamus Hogan. This was the first Shamrock Bowl title in the Vikings' history, having lost in their previous two appearances in 2002 and 2006. It was the Cork Admirals' first Shamrock Bowl appearance.

== 2007 IAFL Playoffs ==
The 2007 playoffs were played by the Belfast Bulls, Belfast Trojans, Dublin Rebels, University of Limerick Vikings, and Cork Admirals, with the following results:

Wild Card
Belfast Trojans	0	Cork Admirals	30*
Semi Final
Belfast Bulls	2	UL Vikings	44*
Cork Admirals	8*	Dublin Rebels	6

== Game summary ==
Scoring summary
Quarter	1	2	3	4	
Cork	8	0	6	0	14
ULV	8	0	7	7	22

=== Pregame news ===
The University of Limerick Vikings were heavily favoured going into the game, as the home team with previous Shamrock Bowl experience.

=== First half ===
Cork got started when kick returner David Barry took the opening kick-off deep into Vikings territory. The Admirals threatened to score, but were stopped on the 15-yard line by the Vikings defense. The Admirals defense held the Vikings offense on their first possession of the game, forcing them to punt the ball. The key play for the Admirals on the ensuing possession was a 40 yard draw by fullback Alain Pezeron which got them a first and goal on the Vikings 3-yard line. Two plays later, Cork's Keith O'Callaghan scored from 3 yards out, following the linemen to the goal line. Pezeron got the 2-point conversion to make the score 8-0 Admirals.

The Vikings got back into the game shortly afterwards. Quarterback Chris Bassitt led them downfield, helped by running backs Andrew Gordon and Seamus Hogan, before Hogan scored a touchdown on a 5-yard run up the middle. Bassitt got the 2-point conversion to level the score at 8-8. Both defenses dominated in the second quarter. The Vikings defenders Declan O'Donnell, Damien Laffan and Alan O'Carroll made a number of key tackles, while the Admirals defensive line of Marcus Gates, Ross McCullough and Barry Rea forced some tackles for loss. With less than 5 minutes to go to half time, Vikings' cornerback Daniel Smith got the first turnover of the day when he picked off a pass intended for Dominic MacHale. However, Vikings' kicker Adrian Garvey missed a field goal and the score remained 8-8 at the half.

=== Second half ===
The second turnover of the game came on the very first play from scrimmage after half time. Admirals linebacker Martin Mulvey recovered an Andrew Gordon fumble to give the Admirals the ball on the Vikings 20-yard line. The Admirals scored a touchdown shortly afterwards on a pass from David Lomasney to receiver Dominic MacHale to give them a 14-8 lead. The Vikings then drove into scoring range getting a 1st and goal on the Admirals 5-yard line. However, a defensive stand by the Admirals prevented a score after they stopped the Vikings on 4th down. The Vikings defense then ensured that their offense got the ball back in good field position when they forced the Admirals to punt after not picking up much yardage on the ensuing possession. This gave the Vikings the ball at midfield and, through runs by Bassitt and Gordon, they got to the 10-yard line. Then Seamus Hogan scored his second touchdown, running up the middle on a draw play and pushing the ball over the goal line as Admirals defenders attempted to tackle him. Adrian Garvey's single point conversion gave the Vikings a one point lead.

The Vikings defense stopped the Cork Admirals again, forcing them to punt the ball early in the 4th quarter. This time the Vikings caught the Admirals' defense off guard as they went to the air with a long pass from Bassitt to receiver Marc Ashworth who was stopped on the Admirals 5-yard line. On the next play, game MVP Seamus Hogan sealed the award with his third touchdown of the day, as he bounced his run to the right and found the corner of the endzone, which was also converted to give the Vikings a 22-14 lead. However, the game was far from over. Admirals quarterback David Lomasney led the Admirals on a long drive, during which O'Callaghan and Pezeron both contributed big yardage. After Seamus Hogan stopped O'Callaghan just short of the endzone, the Admirals looked like they would be sending the game into overtime with a first down on the Vikings 2-yard line. However, the Vikings defense came up with their best defensive performance of the afternoon and held them out on all four downs. The Vikings then tried to run out the clock on the ensuing possession, but were forced to punt after only picking up one first down. With just over 2 minutes remaining, Daniel Smith got off a great punt, pinning the Admirals back inside their own half. But the Admirals still had more than enough time to score. They picked up a couple of first downs, but were stopped on 4th down with less than 30 seconds remaining on the clock as they tried to convert with a Statue of Liberty play to Alan Pezeron. The Vikings then kneeled down to win their first ever Shamrock Bowl, 22-14.
