= Mike Dingle =

American football player (born 1969)

No. 38, 27, 31
- Position: Running back

Personal information
- Born: January 30, 1969 (age 57); Moncks Corner, South Carolina, U.S.
- Listed height: 6 ft 2 in (1.88 m)
- Listed weight: 240 lb (109 kg)

Career information
- High school: Berkeley (Moncks Corner)
- College: South Carolina
- NFL draft: 1991: 8th round, 211th overall pick

Career history
- Cincinnati Bengals (1991–1992); Green Bay Packers (1994)*; San Antonio Texans (1995); Memphis Mad Dogs (1995)
- * Offseason or practice squad member only

Career NFL statistics
- Rushing yards: 91
- Rushing average: 4.3
- Receptions: 5
- Receiving yards: 23
- Touchdowns: 1
- Stats at Pro Football Reference

Mike Dingle (born January 30, 1969) is an American former professional football player who was a running back in the National Football League (NFL) and Canadian Football League (CFL). He played college football for the South Carolina Gamecocks and was selected by the Cincinnati Bengals in the eighth round of the 1991 NFL draft with the 211th overall pick. Dingle played for the Bengals in 1991 and in the CFL for the San Antonio Texans and Memphis Mad Dogs in 1995.
