= Lamar Rogers =

American football player (born 1967)

No. 79, 90
- Position: Defensive end

Personal information
- Born: November 5, 1967 (age 59); Opp, Alabama, U.S.
- Listed height: 6 ft 4 in (1.93 m)
- Listed weight: 290 lb (132 kg)

Career information
- College: Auburn
- NFL draft: 1991: 2nd round, 52nd overall pick

Career history
- Cincinnati Bengals (1991–1992); Scottish Claymores (1995); Tampa Bay Storm (1996); Florida Bobcats (1997)

Awards and highlights
- ArenaBowl champion (1996)

Career NFL statistics
- Sacks: 4
- Stats at Pro Football Reference

Lamar Rogers (born November 5, 1967) is an American former professional football player who was a defensive end in the National Football League (NFL). He was selected by and played for the Cincinnati Bengals in 1991 and 1992. Rogers played college football for the Auburn Tigers.
