= Billy Alford =

American football player (born 1981)

Bill Alford
No. 2
- Position: Defensive back

Personal information
- Born: October 30, 1981 (age 45); Brunswick, Georgia, U.S.
- Listed height: 5 ft 9 in (1.75 m)
- Listed weight: 190 lb (86 kg)

Career information
- High school: Brunswick (GA)
- College: Vanderbilt
- NFL draft: 2005: undrafted

Career history

Playing
- Baltimore Ravens (2005)*; Nashville Kats (2006)*; Frankfurt Galaxy (2006); Atlanta Falcons (2006)*; Denver Broncos (2007)*; Frankfurt Galaxy (2007); Jacksonville Sharks (2010–2013)
- * Offseason or practice squad member only

Coaching
- Jacksonville Sharks (DB) (2014)

Awards and highlights
- ArenaBowl champion (2011)

Career AFL statistics
- Tackles: 153
- Pass breakups: 27
- Fumble recoveries: 2
- Interceptions: 6
- Defensive TDs: 2
- Stats at ArenaFan.com

William Alford (born October 30, 1981) is an American former professional football defensive back who played for the Jacksonville Sharks of the Arena Football League (AFL). He played college football at Vanderbilt University.
