= Matt Sinclair =

American football player (born 1982)

No. 58
- Position: Linebacker

Personal information
- Born: July 24, 1982 (age 44); St. Louis, Missouri, U.S.
- Listed height: 6 ft 2 in (1.88 m)
- Listed weight: 245 lb (111 kg)

Career information
- College: Illinois
- NFL draft: 2005: undrafted

Career history
- Baltimore Ravens (2005)*; Miami Dolphins (2006)*; Frankfurt Galaxy (2006-2007); Washington Redskins (2007–2008)
- * Offseason or practice squad member only

Career NFL statistics
- Total tackles: 2
- Stats at Pro Football Reference

Matthew Christopher Sinclair (born July 24, 1982) is an American former professional football player who was a linebacker in the National Football League (NFL). He was signed by the Baltimore Ravens as an undrafted free agent in 2005. He played college football for the Illinois Fighting Illini.

Sinclair has also played for the Miami Dolphins and Washington Redskins.

Head coach

On February 21, 2023, Sinclair accepted a head coaching position with the Fisher Jr. Sr. High School football team. This is his first time as a head coach.
