= Jabari Levey =

American football player (born 1984)

No. 71
- Position: Offensive tackle

Personal information
- Born: July 16, 1984 (age 42); Moncks Corner, South Carolina, U.S.
- Listed height: 6 ft 6 in (1.98 m)
- Listed weight: 315 lb (143 kg)

Career information
- High school: Moncks Corner (SC) Berkeley Co.
- College: South Carolina
- NFL draft: 2006: undrafted

Career history
- Oakland Raiders (2006)*; Tampa Bay Buccaneers (2007)*; → Berlin Thunder (2007)
- * Offseason or practice squad member only

Jabari Levey (born July 16, 1984) is an American former football offensive lineman. He played his college football at South Carolina.

After a "poor" senior season, Levey went undrafted in the 2006 NFL draft. He was signed by the Oakland Raiders, but released before playing a game. He later was acquired by the Berlin Thunder.
