= Antoine Bennett =

American football player (born 1967)

No. 35
- Position: Defensive back

Personal information
- Born: November 29, 1967 (age 58); Miami, Florida, U.S.
- Listed height: 5 ft 11 in (1.80 m)
- Listed weight: 185 lb (84 kg)

Career information
- High school: Miami Edison
- College: Florida A&M
- NFL draft: 1991: 12th round, 322nd overall pick

Career history
- Cincinnati Bengals (1991–1992); Ohio Glory (1992); Detroit Lions (1993)*
- * Offseason or practice squad member only

Career NFL statistics
- Fumble recoveries: 1
- Stats at Pro Football Reference

Antoine Bennett (born November 29, 1967) is an American former professional football player who was a defensive back for the Cincinnati Bengals of the National Football League (NFL) from 1991 to 1992. He played college football for the Florida A&M Rattlers and was selected 322nd overall by the Bengals in the 12th round of the 1991 NFL draft.
