= 2010 UFL draft =

The 2010 UFL Draft logo

The 2010 UFL draft was the second draft of the United Football League. The draft took place on Wednesday, June 2, beginning at 7 p.m. EDT. The draft was held over a period of 12 rounds during which each of the five UFL teams was allowed one pick per round, in reverse order of 2009 finish, with the expansion Omaha Nighthawks picking first and the champion Las Vegas Locomotives picking last in each round. In Rounds 7–12, the selection order rotated forward each round. During rounds one and two, each team had five minutes to make their selection of a player. During rounds three through twelve, each team had three minutes to make their selection of a player. The round-by-round results were announced via each team's official Twitter feed.

Players selected in the draft remain on each team's reserve/unsigned list until formally added to the roster by virtue of a negotiated contract.

== Player selections ==
=== Round one ===
Pick	UFL team	Player	Position	College
1	Omaha Nighthawks	Dewayne White	DE	Louisville
2	Hartford Colonials	Andre Dixon	RB	Connecticut
3	Sacramento Mountain Lions	Justin Goltz	QB	Occidental
4	Florida Tuskers	Weston Dacus	LB	Arkansas
5	Las Vegas Locomotives	Dominic Payne	LB	Western State

=== Round two ===
Pick	UFL team	Player	Position	College
6	Omaha Nighthawks	Chike Okeafor	DE	Purdue
7	Hartford Colonials	Anthony Montgomery	DL	Minnesota
8	Sacramento Mountain Lions	Tavita Thompson	OT	Oregon State
9	Florida Tuskers	Arnold Harrison	LB	Georgia
10	Las Vegas Locomotives	Michael Ray Garvin	CB	Florida State

=== Round three ===
Pick	UFL team	Player	Position	College
11	Omaha Nighthawks	Shawn Andrews	OT	Arkansas
12	Hartford Colonials	Shawn Bayes	WR	Kent State
13	Sacramento Mountain Lions	Tim Clark	CB	Oregon State
14	Florida Tuskers	John Standeford	WR	Purdue
15	Las Vegas Locomotives	Brian Coulter	DE	Missouri

=== Round four ===
Pick	UFL team	Player	Position	College
16	Omaha Nighthawks	Adrian Jones	OT	Kansas
17	Hartford Colonials	Andre Barbour	OL	Eastern Kentucky
18	Sacramento Mountain Lions	Udeme Udofia	DT	Stanford
19	Florida Tuskers	Erik Pedersen	LB	Portland State
20	Las Vegas Locomotives	Ryan Considine	OT	Louisiana Tech

=== Round five ===
Pick	UFL team	Player	Position	College
21	Omaha Nighthawks	Kenny Peterson	DT	Ohio State
22	Hartford Colonials	Simoni Lawrence	LB	Minnesota
23	Sacramento Mountain Lions	Ryan McFoy	S	Arizona State
24	Florida Tuskers	Tyrrell Herbert	S	Toledo
25	Las Vegas Locomotives	Jovonte Taylor	WR	Hawaii

=== Round six ===
Pick	UFL team	Player	Position	College
26	Omaha Nighthawks	Ronald Curry	WR	North Carolina
27	Hartford Colonials	Tim Mattran	OL	Stanford
28	Sacramento Mountain Lions	Antonio Chatman	WR	Cincinnati
29	Florida Tuskers	Adrien Clarke	OL	Ohio State
30	Las Vegas Locomotives	Russ Weil	FB	Illinois

=== Round seven ===
Pick	UFL team	Player	Position	College
31	Hartford Colonials	Robert Ortiz	WR	San Diego State
32	Sacramento Mountain Lions	Carl Spitale	OT	Florida Atlantic
33	Florida Tuskers	Kevin Harris	FB	Wake Forest
34	Las Vegas Locomotives	Cliff Washburn	OT	The Citadel
35	Omaha Nighthawks	DeMarcus Faggins	CB	Kansas State

=== Round eight ===
Pick	UFL team	Player	Position	College
36	Sacramento Mountain Lions	Dennis Keyes	S	UCLA
37	Florida Tuskers	Cortez Hankton	WR	Texas Southern
38	Las Vegas Locomotives	Eddy Newton	WR	Baylor
39	Omaha Nighthawks	Devard Darling	WR	Washington State
40	Hartford Colonials	Asaph Schwapp	FB	Notre Dame

=== Round nine ===
Pick	UFL team	Player	Position	College
41	Florida Tuskers	Corey Small	DB	Florida Atlantic
42	Las Vegas Locomotives	Tony Parrish	S	Washington
43	Omaha Nighthawks	Nate Webster	LB	Miami (FL)
44	Hartford Colonials	Brandon Drumgoole	DL	Greensboro College
45	Sacramento Mountain Lions	Bobby Guillory	WR	Central Missouri

=== Round ten ===
Pick	UFL team	Player	Position	College
46	Las Vegas Locomotives	Lewis Baker	S	Oklahoma
47	Omaha Nighthawks	Frank Walker	CB	Tuskegee
48	Hartford Colonials	Ben Benshoof	OL	Wingate
49	Sacramento Mountain Lions	Curtis Young	DE	Cincinnati
50	Florida Tuskers	Chris Perri	DE	Stony Brook

=== Round eleven ===
Pick	UFL team	Player	Position	College
51	Omaha Nighthawks	Hollis Thomas	DT	Northern Illinois
52	Hartford Colonials	Clint McPeek	LB	New Mexico
53	Sacramento Mountain Lions	Willie Glasper	CB	Oregon
54	Florida Tuskers	Greg Middleton	DE	Indiana
55	Las Vegas Locomotives	Alex Henderson	RB	Northern Arizona

=== Round twelve ===
Pick	UFL team	Player	Position	College
56	Hartford Colonials	Kendall Briscoe	DT	New Mexico
57	Sacramento Mountain Lions	Terrence Blevins	RB	Eastern Michigan
58	Florida Tuskers	Melvin Fowler	C	Maryland
59	Las Vegas Locomotives	Gabe Long	DT	Utah
60	Omaha Nighthawks	Nick Ferguson	S	Georgia Tech
