= Justin Brown (defensive lineman) =

American gridiron football player (born 1982)

No. 95
- Position: Defensive lineman

Personal information
- Born: April 16, 1982 (age 44); Fletcher, Oklahoma, U.S.
- Listed height: 6 ft 2 in (1.88 m)
- Listed weight: 260 lb (118 kg)

Career information
- High school: Elgin
- College: East Central
- NFL draft: 2005: undrafted

Career history
- Indianapolis Colts (2005–2006)*; Frankfurt Galaxy (2006–2007); Dallas Desperados (2006)*; New Orleans VooDoo (2006–2008); Calgary Stampeders (2009); Edmonton Eskimos (2009–2010); Milwaukee Mustangs (2011)
- * Offseason or practice squad member only

Awards and highlights
- All-District (2000); All-Area (2000); Lone Star Conference North second team All-American (2003); American Football Coaches Association All-American (2004); Lone Star Conference Defensive lineman of the Year (2004)
- Stats at CFL.ca (archive)
- Stats at ArenaFan.com

Justin O'Mara Brown (born April 16, 1982) is a former professional American, Canadian football and arena football defensive end. He was signed as an undrafted free agent by the Indianapolis Colts in 2005. He played college football for the East Central Tigers.

Brown has also played for the Frankfurt Galaxy, Dallas Desperados, New Orleans VooDoo, Calgary Stampeders and Edmonton Eskimos.

== Early life ==
Brown was born in Fletcher, Oklahoma on April 16, 1982. He attended Elgin High School in Elgin, Oklahoma where he was all-district and an all-area selection.

== College career ==
Brown attended East Central University where he majored in psychology. During his college career, he made a total of six All-American teams between 2001 and 2004.

=== 2001 ===
As a freshman, Brown had 14 tackles, one sack, one interception and two passes deflected in eight starts.

=== 2002 ===
Brown recorded 38 tackles, six sacks, and forced one fumble and started 10 games as a sophomore.

=== 2003 ===
During his junior year, Brown started 11 games. He recorded 53 tackles, six sacks, two deflected passes, and two forced fumbles. After the season, he was named a Lone Star Conference north second-team All-American.

=== 2004 ===
In his senior year he recorded career highs in tackles (72), sacks (10.5), tackles for losses (15), and deflected passes (10). He was named an American Football Coaches Association All-American, and the Lone Star Conference defensive lineman of the year.

== Professional career ==
=== Indianapolis Colts ===
After going undrafted in the 2005 NFL draft, Brown signed with the Indianapolis Colts in April.

=== Dallas Desperados ===
Brown signed with the Dallas Desperados for the 2006 Arena Football League season.

=== New Orleans VooDoo ===
In the second round of the 2006 Arena Football League expansion draft, Brown was selected by the New Orleans VooDoo.

=== Calgary Stampeders ===
On May 7, 2009, Brown signed with the Calgary Stampeders. In his regular season debut with Calgary, Brown has six tackles against the Montreal Alouettes. He was released on August 22.

=== Edmonton Eskimos ===
Brown was signed by the Edmonton Eskimos' practice roster on October 7, 2009.
