= Robert Ortiz =

American gridiron football player (born 1983)

No. 80
- Position: Wide receiver

Personal information
- Born: May 30, 1983 (age 43); San Diego, California, U.S.
- Listed height: 6 ft 1 in (1.85 m)
- Listed weight: 188 lb (85 kg)

Career information
- College: San Diego State
- NFL draft: 2006: undrafted

Career history
- San Diego Chargers (2006)*; Frankfurt Galaxy (2007); Seattle Seahawks (2007)*; BC Lions (2007); New England Patriots (2008)*; San Francisco 49ers (2008)*; New England Patriots (2009)*; Hartford Colonials (2010)*
- * Offseason or practice squad member only

Robert J. Ortiz (born May 30, 1983) is an American former football wide receiver. He was signed by the San Diego Chargers as an undrafted free agent in 2006. He played college football at San Diego State. Ortiz was also a member of the Frankfurt Galaxy, Seattle Seahawks, BC Lions, New England Patriots, San Francisco 49ers and Hartford Colonials. Robert is also a model & actor, whom appeared in the former ABC reality show Expedition Impossible.

== Professional career ==
=== Frankfurt Galaxy ===
Ortiz was selected by the Frankfurt Galaxy in the eight round of the 2007 NFL Europa Free Agent Draft. He appeared in eight games (including four starts) and finished as the team's third-leading receiver with 27 receptions for 255 yards and two touchdowns.

=== Hartford Colonials ===
Ortiz was drafted by the Hartford Colonials in the seventh round of 2010 UFL draft.

== After football ==
Ortiz was a contestant on the 2011 season of the reality game show Expedition Impossible.
