= 2007 Cologne Centurions season =

NFL Europa team season

- General manager: Hauke Wilkens
- Head coach: David Duggan; John Lyons (interim)
- Home stadium: RheinEnergieStadion

Results
- Record: 6–4
- Division place: 3rd
- Playoffs: Did not qualify

The 2007 Cologne Centurions season was the fourth and final season for the franchise in the NFL Europa League (NFLEL). The team were led by head coach David Duggan in his second year and played its home games at RheinEnergieStadion in Cologne, Germany. When Duggan gave up coaching after week nine due to health issues, defensive coordinator John Lyons was elevated to the position of interim head coach for the final game. They finished the season in third place with a record of six wins and four losses. The National Football League (NFL) announced the closure of its European branch on June 29.

== Offseason ==
=== Free agent draft ===
2007 Cologne Centurions NFLEL free agent draft selections
Draft order		Player name	Position	College
Round	Choice	Player name	Position	College
1	3	Jon Alston	G	South Carolina
2	9	George Gause	DE	South Carolina
3	16	Cedrick Holt	CB	North Carolina
4	21	C. J. Brooks	G	Maryland
5	28	Bobby Blizzard	TE	North Carolina
6	33	A. J. Harris	RB	Northern Illinois
7	40	Devan Long	DE	Oregon
8	45	Kellen Davis	T	Oklahoma State
9	52	Rod Olds	C	Jacksonville State
10	57	Martin Patterson	LB	Texas Christian
11	64	Tyler King	DE	Connecticut
12	69	Ernest Jones	DT	Tennessee State
13	76	Mario Hill	WR	Mississippi
14	81	Jon Simmons	DE	South Florida
15	88	Kenton Johnson	T	Georgia Tech
16	93	Burl Toler	WR	California
17	100	Victor Phillips	CB	Southern
18	105	Jamar Enzor	LB	Cincinnati
19	112	Mike Douglas	TE	Massachusetts
20	117	Antwann Carter	RB	Boise State
21	124	Trenton Jordan	DE	Central Florida
22	129	Terrance Butler	CB	Wyoming

== Personnel ==
=== Staff ===
2007 Cologne Centurions staff
Front office: General manager – Hauke Wilkens; Head coaches: Head coach – David Duggan; Offensive coaches: Offensive coordinator/quarterbacks – Jeff Filkovski; National coach/running backs – Lee Rowland; Wide receivers – Don Holmes; Tight ends – Wendell Davis; Offensive line – Tom Lovat	Defensive coaches: Defensive coordinator/defensive backs – John Lyons; Defensive line – Tracy Simien; Linebackers – Mark Sander; Special teams coaches: National coach/special teams – Lee Rowland; Strength and conditioning: Strength and conditioning – Joe Shufelt

=== Roster ===
2007 Cologne Centurions final roster
Quarterbacks: 9 Erik Meyer; 5 Quinton Porter; Running backs: 21 Antwaun Carter (IR); 38 A. J. Harris; 20 Derrick Ross; Wide receivers: 11 Jovon Bouknight; 19 Tramain Hall; 85 Brian Hare; 84 Greg Lee; 15 Dan Sheldon; 10 Burl Toler; Tight ends: 88 Bobby Blizzard; 89 Tony Curtis; 83 Michael Douglas	Offensive linemen: 78 Jon Alston T; 75 Aldo De La Garza G; 77 Cody Douglas T (IR); 53 Greg Eslinger C; 67 Kili Lefotu G; 73 Alan Reuber T; 72 Stefon Wheeler T; Defensive linemen: 68 McKinley Boykin DT; 99 George Gause DE; 94 Jason Hall DE; 90 Tom Johnson DT; 52 Tyler King DE; 92 Devan Long DE; 91 Kevin Vickerson DT	Linebackers: 40 Craig Kobel OLB; 56 Martin Patterson MLB; 55 John Saldi OLB; 50 Clifton Smith MLB; Defensive backs: 31 Kevin Curtis FS; 22 Gabe Franklin CB; 25 Cedrick Holt CB; 32 Kevin House Jr. CB; 28 Alvin Nnabuife SS; 30 Chris Reis SS; 24 Jerron Wishom CB; Special teams: 1 Nick Novak K; 6 Joel Stelly P	National players: 44 (Mexico) Omar Erick Cantu OLB; 66 (Finland) Seppo Evwaraye G; 47 (France) Philippe Gardent OLB; 86 (Germany) Werner Hippler TE; 98 (Mexico) Mauricio Lopez DT; 80 (Sweden) Cristian Malm WR; 57 (Finland) Jarmo Rantanen C; 35 (Germany) Daniel Schober FS; Rookies in italics

== Schedule ==
Week	Date	Kickoff (Note: All times are Central European Summer Time (CEST).)	Opponent	Results		Game site	Attendance
Week	Date	Kickoff	Opponent	Final score	Team record	Game site	Attendance
1	Saturday, April 14	6:00 p.m.	at Hamburg Sea Devils	W 24–18	1–0	AOL Arena	20,887
2	Saturday, April 21	6:00 p.m.	Frankfurt Galaxy	L 13–18	1–1	RheinEnergieStadion	16,422
3	Saturday, April 28	7:00 p.m.	at Rhein Fire	W 14–6	2–1	LTU arena	21,347
4	Saturday, May 5	6:00 p.m.	Berlin Thunder	L 28–31	2–2	RheinEnergieStadion	10,084
5	Sunday, May 13	4:00 p.m.	at Berlin Thunder	W 24–10	3–2	Olympic Stadium	11,995
6	Saturday, May 19	6:00 p.m.	Rhein Fire	W 20–17	4–2	RheinEnergieStadion	22,154
7	Friday, May 25	8:00 p.m.	at Amsterdam Admirals	W 30–7	5–2	Amsterdam ArenA	11,714
8	Saturday, June 2	6:00 p.m.	Hamburg Sea Devils	L 7–21	5–3	RheinEnergieStadion	10,221
9	Saturday, June 9	6:00 p.m.	Amsterdam Admirals	W 31–13	6–3	RheinEnergieStadion	12,878
10	Saturday, June 16	7:00 p.m.	at Frankfurt Galaxy	L 14–31	6–4	Commerzbank-Arena	35,087

== Standings ==
NFL Europa League
Team	W	L	T	PCT	PF	PA	Home	Road	STK
Hamburg Sea Devils	7	3	0	.700	231	176	4–1	3–2	W4
Frankfurt Galaxy	7	3	0	.700	254	179	5–0	2–3	W1
Cologne Centurions	6	4	0	.600	205	172	2–3	4–1	L1
Rhein Fire	4	6	0	.400	166	212	2–3	2–3	L1
Amsterdam Admirals	4	6	0	.400	194	250	3–2	1–4	W1
Berlin Thunder	2	8	0	.200	146	207	0–5	2–3	L6

== Game summaries ==
=== Week 1: at Hamburg Sea Devils ===
Week One: Cologne Centurions at Hamburg Sea Devils – Game summary

Quarter	1	2	3	4	Total
Cologne	0	14	3	7	24
Hamburg	6	0	6	6	18

at AOL Arena, Hamburg, Germany

- Date: Saturday, April 14
- Game time: 6:00 p.m. CEST
- Game attendance: 20,887

=== Week 2: vs Frankfurt Galaxy ===
Week Two: Frankfurt Galaxy at Cologne Centurions – Game summary

Quarter	1	2	3	4	Total
Frankfurt	7	4	7	0	18
Cologne	7	3	0	3	13

at RheinEnergieStadion, Cologne, Germany

- Date: Saturday, April 21
- Game time: 6:00 p.m.
- Game attendance: 16,422

=== Week 3: at Rhein Fire ===
Week Three: Cologne Centurions at Rhein Fire – Game summary

Quarter	1	2	3	4	Total
Cologne	0	7	0	7	14
Rhein	3	0	3	0	6

at LTU arena, Düsseldorf, Germany

- Date: Saturday, April 28
- Game time: 7:00 p.m. CEST
- Game attendance: 21,347

=== Week 4: vs Berlin Thunder ===
Week Four: Berlin Thunder at Cologne Centurions – Game summary

Quarter	1	2	3	4	Total
Berlin	0	14	3	14	31
Cologne	14	14	0	0	28

at RheinEnergieStadion, Cologne, Germany

- Date: Saturday, May 5
- Game time: 6:07 p.m. CEST
- Game weather: 72 °F (22.2 °C), mostly cloudy
- Game attendance: 10,084
- Referee: John Parry

=== Week 5: at Berlin Thunder ===
Week Five: Cologne Centurions at Berlin Thunder – Game summary

Quarter	1	2	3	4	Total
Cologne	7	3	14	0	24
Berlin	3	0	0	7	10

at Olympic Stadium, Berlin, Germany

- Date: Sunday, May 13
- Game time: 4:00 p.m.
- Game attendance: 11.995

=== Week 6: vs Rhein Fire ===
Week Six: Rhein Fire at Cologne Centurions – Game summary

Quarter	1	2	3	4	Total
Rhein	3	7	7	0	17
Cologne	0	3	7	10	20

at RheinEnergieStadion, Cologne, Germany

- Date: Saturday, May 19
- Game time: 6:00 p.m.
- Game attendance: 22,154

=== Week 7: at Amsterdam Admirals ===
Week Seven: Cologne Centurions at Amsterdam Admirals – Game summary

Quarter	1	2	3	4	Total
Cologne	7	9	14	0	30
Amsterdam	0	0	0	7	7

at Amsterdam ArenA, Amsterdam, Netherlands

- Date: Friday, May 25
- Game time: 8:05 p.m. CEST
- Game attendance: 11,714
- Referee: Don Carey

=== Week 8: vs Hamburg Sea Devils ===
Week Eight: Hamburg Sea Devils at Cologne Centurions – Game summary

Quarter	1	2	3	4	Total
Hamburg	7	0	7	7	21
Cologne	0	0	7	0	7

at RheinEnergieStadion, Cologne, Germany

- Date: Saturday, June 2
- Game time: 6:00 p.m. CEST
- Game attendance: 10,221

=== Week 9: vs Amsterdam Admirals ===
Week Nine: Amsterdam Admirals at Cologne Centurions – Game summary

Quarter	1	2	3	4	Total
Amsterdam	3	7	3	0	13
Cologne	0	14	3	14	31

at RheinEnergieStadion, Cologne, Germany

- Date: Saturday, June 9
- Game time: 6:06 p.m. CEST
- Game attendance: 12,878
- Referee: John Hussey

=== Week 10: at Frankfurt Galaxy ===
Week Ten: Cologne Centurions at Frankfurt Galaxy – Game summary

Quarter	1	2	3	4	Total
Cologne	0	0	7	7	14
Frankfurt	3	10	14	4	31

at Commerzbank-Arena, Frankfurt, Germany

- Date: Saturday, June 16
- Game time: 7:00 p.m. CEST
- Game attendance: 35,087

== Honors ==
After the completion of the regular season, the All-NFL Europa League team was selected by the NFLEL coaching staffs, members of a media panel and fans voting online at NFLEurope.com. Overall, Cologne had eight players selected, tying for the most with Hamburg. The selections were:

- Bobby Blizzard, tight end
- Greg Eslinger, center
- Philippe Gardent, linebacker
- Jason Hall, defensive end
- Kevin House, cornerback
- Chris Reis, safety
- Derrick Ross, running back
- Kevin Vickerson, defensive tackle

Additionally, Hall and Ross were named defensive and co-offensive MVPs, respectively. Hall set a franchise record with 12 sacks and anchored the Centurions defense which ranked first in total yards allowed (2,561) and total points allowed (172). He also tied a league record by recording a sack in seven consecutive games. Ross, who shared the award with Frankfurt's quarterback J. T. O'Sullivan, was the NFLEL's leading rusher with 802 yards and four 100-yard games. He also totaled a league-best 933 yards from scrimmage (802 rushing, 131 receiving) and scored five touchdowns.
