= 2006 Cologne Centurions season =

NFL Europe team season

- General manager: Hauke Wilkens
- Head coach: David Duggan
- Home stadium: RheinEnergieStadion

Results
- Record: 4–6
- Division place: 4th
- Playoffs: Did not qualify

The 2006 Cologne Centurions season was the third season for the franchise in the NFL Europe League (NFLEL). The team was led by head coach David Duggan in his first year, and played its home games at RheinEnergieStadion in Cologne, Germany. They finished the regular season in fourth place with a record of four wins and six losses.

== Offseason ==
=== Free agent draft ===
2006 Cologne Centurions NFLEL free agent draft selections
Draft order		Player name	Position	College
Round	Choice	Player name	Position	College
1	4	Darrell Wright	DE	Oregon
2	10	Reggie Newhouse	WR	Baylor
3	15	Todd Bates	DE	Alabama
4	22	Randee Drew	DB	Northern Illinois
5	27	Omar Nazel	DE	Southern California
6	34	Bryan Save	DT	Colorado State
7	39	Thomas Houchin	DE	Kansas State
8	46	Chase Johnson	C	Texas Christian
9	51	Ryan Hoffman	DE	Shippensburg State
10	57	Matt Clark	CB	UCLA

== Personnel ==
=== Staff ===
2006 Cologne Centurions staff
Front office: General manager – Hauke Wilkens; Head coaches: Head coach – David Duggan; Offensive coaches: Offensive coordinator/quarterbacks – Scott Milanovich; National coach/running backs/special teams – Marco Knorr; Wide receivers – Ken Oxendine; Offensive line/tight ends – Tim Grunhard	Defensive coaches: Defensive coordinator/defensive backs – John Lyons; Defensive line – Chris Ward; Assistant Defensive Backs – Sam Garnes; Strength and conditioning: Strength and conditioning – Joe Shufelt

=== Roster ===
2006 Cologne Centurions final roster
Quarterbacks: 7 Shane Boyd; 16 Kliff Kingsbury; 5 Tory Woodbury; Running backs: 32 Jamaal Branch; 27 Terry Butler; 25 Alex Haynes; 22 Fred Russell; Wide receivers: 19 Brian Bratton; 13 Jamall Broussard; 80 Michael Gasperson; 81 Reggie Newhouse; Tight ends: 88 Mario Jackson; 89 Calen Powell; 87 Trent Smith	Offensive linemen: 79 Jon Doty T; 54 Phil Hawkins G; 77 Daniel Martz G; 72 William Obeng T; 74 Erik Pears G/T; 57 Dave Pearson C; 73 Jared Peck T; 52 Kyle Schmitt C; Defensive linemen: 95 Arrion Dixon DT; 78 Eddie Freeman DT; 99 Otis Grigsby DE; 92 Alain Kashama DE; 94 Tyler King DE; 56 Omar Nazel DE; 98 Bryan Save DT; 91 Darrell Wright DE	Linebackers: 55 Andrew Battle OLB; 48 David Bergeron OLB; 42 Josh Dean OLB; 58 Thomas Houchin MLB; 40 Jonathan Pollard MLB; 55 Robert Rodriguez MLB; Defensive backs: 26 Matt Clark CB; 31 Kevin Curtis FS; 23 Mark Estelle CB; 30 Lance Frazier CB; 20 Brandon Pinderhughes FS; 41 Ray Ventrone SS; 21 Aric Williams CB; Special teams: 15 Tim Duncan K; 9 Gabe Lindstrom P; 1 Nick Setta K	National players: 44 (Mexico) Omar Erick Cantu OLB; 47 (France) Philippe Gardent OLB; 86 (Germany) Werner Hippler TE; 14 (Germany) Christopher Liess WR; 96 (Mexico) Mauricio Lopez DT; 75 (Mexico) Cesar Loredo T; 51 (Germany) David Odenthal C/G; 17 (Japan) Michihiro Ogawa WR; 34 (Germany) Daniel Schober SS; Rookies in italics

== Schedule ==
Week	Date	Kickoff (Note: All times are in Central European Time (CET), or Central European Summer Time (CEST) after March 25.)	Opponent	Results		Game site	Attendance
Week	Date	Kickoff	Opponent	Final score	Team record	Game site	Attendance
1	Saturday, March 18	6:00 p.m.	at Hamburg Sea Devils	W 14–10	1–0	AOL Arena	15,243
2	Sunday, March 26	4:00 p.m.	Amsterdam Admirals	L 15–20	1–1	RheinEnergieStadion	17,251
3	Sunday, April 2	4:00 p.m.	Rhein Fire	L 10–20	1–2	RheinEnergieStadion	16,961
4	Saturday, April 8	7:00 p.m.	at Frankfurt Galaxy	L 14–21	1–3	Commerzbank-Arena	23,125
5	Monday, April 17	6:00 p.m.	at Berlin Thunder	L 13–24	1–4	Olympic Stadium	13,559
6	Sunday, April 23	4:00 p.m.	Hamburg Sea Devils	W 20–17	2–4	RheinEnergieStadion	9,238
7	Sunday, April 30	4:00 p.m.	Frankfurt Galaxy	L 10–17	2–5	RheinEnergieStadion	11,800
8	Saturday, May 6	7:00 p.m.	at Amsterdam Admirals	W 20–13	3–5	Amsterdam ArenA	12,228
9	Sunday, May 14	4:00 p.m.	Berlin Thunder	W 25–7	4–5	RheinEnergieStadion	12,438
10	Saturday, May 20	7:00 p.m.	at Rhein Fire	L 10–21	4–6	LTU arena	28,334

== Standings ==
NFL Europe League
Team	W	L	T	PCT	PF	PA	Home	Road	STK
Amsterdam Admirals	7	3	0	.700	259	234	2–3–0	5–0–0	L1
Frankfurt Galaxy	7	3	0	.700	172	160	4–1–0	3–2–0	W1
Rhein Fire	6	4	0	.600	207	165	4–1–0	2–3–0	W1
Cologne Centurions	4	6	0	.400	151	170	2–3–0	2–3–0	L1
Hamburg Sea Devils	3	6	1	.350	194	193	1–3–1	2–3–0	W3
Berlin Thunder	2	7	1	.250	180	241	1–4–0	1–3–1	L5

== Game summaries ==
=== Week 1: at Hamburg Sea Devils ===
Week One: Cologne Centurions at Hamburg Sea Devils – Game summary

Quarter	1	2	3	4	Total
Cologne	7	0	7	0	14
Hamburg	10	0	0	0	10

at AOL Arena, Hamburg, Germany

- Date: Saturday, March 18
- Game time: 6:08 p.m. CET
- Game weather: 32 °F (0 °C), cloudy
- Game attendance: 15,243
- Referee: Gene Steratore

=== Week 2: vs Amsterdam Admirals ===
Week Two: Amsterdam Admirals at Cologne Centurions – Game summary

Quarter	1	2	3	4	Total
Amsterdam	3	7	10	0	20
Cologne	0	13	0	2	15

at RheinEnergieStadion, Cologne, Germany

- Date: Sunday, March 26
- Game time: 4:05 p.m. CEST
- Game weather: 61 °F (16.24 °C), mostly clouded
- Game attendance: 17,251
- Referee: Terry Brown

=== Week 3: vs Rhein Fire ===
Week Three: Rhein Fire at Cologne Centurions – Game summary

Quarter	1	2	3	4	Total
Rhein	7	3	7	3	20
Cologne	0	10	0	0	10

at RheinEnergieStadion, Cologne, Germany

- Date: Sunday, April 2
- Game time: 4:06 p.m. CEST
- Game weather: 55 °F (12.8 °C), partly cloudly
- Game attendance: 16,961
- Referee: Craig Wrolstad

=== Week 4: at Frankfurt Galaxy ===
Week Four: Cologne Centurions at Frankfurt Galaxy – Game summary

Quarter	1	2	3	4	Total
Cologne	0	7	0	7	14
Frankfurt	0	14	0	7	21

at Commerzbank-Arena, Frankfurt, Germany

- Date: Saturday, April 8
- Game time: 7:05 p.m. CEST
- Game weather: 56 °F (13 °C), sunny
- Game attendance: 23,125
- Referee: Jerome Boger

=== Week 5: at Berlin Thunder ===
Week Five: Cologne Centurions at Berlin Thunder – Game summary

Quarter	1	2	3	4	Total
Cologne	0	0	7	6	13
Berlin	0	10	7	7	24

at Olympic Stadium, Berlin, Germany

- Date: Monday, April 17
- Game time: 6:00 p.m. CEST
- Game attendance: 13,559

=== Week 6: vs Hamburg Sea Devils ===
Week Six: Hamburg Sea Devils at Cologne Centurions– Game summary

Quarter	1	2	3	4	Total
Hamburg	0	3	7	7	17
Cologne	3	0	3	14	20

at RheinEnergieStadion, Cologne, Germany

- Date: Sunday, April 23
- Game time: 4:00 p.m.
- Game attendance: 9,238

=== Week 7: vs Frankfurt Galaxy ===
Week Seven: Frankfurt Galaxy at Cologne Centurions – Game summary

Quarter	1	2	3	4	Total
Frankfurt	0	10	0	7	17
Cologne	7	0	3	0	10

at RheinEnergieStadion, Cologne, Germany

- Date: Sunday, April 30
- Game time: 4:06 p.m. CEST
- Game weather: 49 °F (9 °C), mostly cloudly
- Game attendance: 11,800
- Referee: Gene Steratore

=== Week 8: at Amsterdam Admirals ===
Week Eight: Cologne Centurions at Amsterdam Admirals – Game summary

Quarter	1	2	3	4	Total
Cologne	3	10	7	0	20
Amsterdam	3	0	0	10	13

at Amsterdam Arena, Amsterdam, Netherlands

- Date: Saturday, May 6
- Game time: 7:05 p.m. CEST
- Game weather: 71 °F (22 °C), roof open, clear skies, fair
- Game attendance: 12,228
- Referee: Carl Cheffers

=== Week 9: vs Berlin Thunder ===
Week Nine: Berlin Thunder at Cologne Centurions – Game summary

Quarter	1	2	3	4	Total
Berlin	0	0	7	0	7
Cologne	14	3	2	6	25

at RheinEnergieStadion, Cologne, Germany

- Date: Sunday, May 14
- Game time: 4:00 p.m.
- Game attendance: 12,438

=== Week 10: at Rhein Fire ===
Week Ten: Cologne Centurions at Rhein Fire – Game summary

Quarter	1	2	3	4	Total
Cologne	7	3	0	0	10
Rhein	7	0	14	0	21

at LTU arena, Düsseldorf, Germany

- Date: Saturday, May 20
- Game time: 7:06 p.m. CEST
- Game weather: 52 °F (11.1 °C)
- Game attendance: 28,334
- Referee: Greg Meyer

== Honors ==
After the completion of the regular season, the All-NFL Europe League team was selected by the NFLEL coaching staffs, members of a media panel and fans voting online at NFLEurope.com. Overall, Cologne had four players selected. The selections were:

- Philippe Gardent, linebacker
- Gabe Lindstrom, punter
- Erik Pears, guard
- Bryan Save, defensive tackle

Additionally, Gardent was named co-defensive MVP, sharing the award with Amsterdam Admirals' defensive tackle Tony Brown. The French, who was in his fourth season in the NFLEL and second with Cologne, became the first national player to win MVP honors after leading the league with 70 tackles.
