= Philippe Gardent =

Philippe Gardent may refer to:

- Philippe Gardent (rugby league) (born 1979), French rugby league player and former American football player
- Philippe Gardent (handballer) (born 1964), French Olympic handball player
