= David Duggan =

David Duggan may refer to:

- David Milwyn Duggan (1879–1942), politician in Alberta, Canada
- David Duggan (American football) (born 1963), American football coach and former player
