= Chris Reis =

American football player (born 1983)

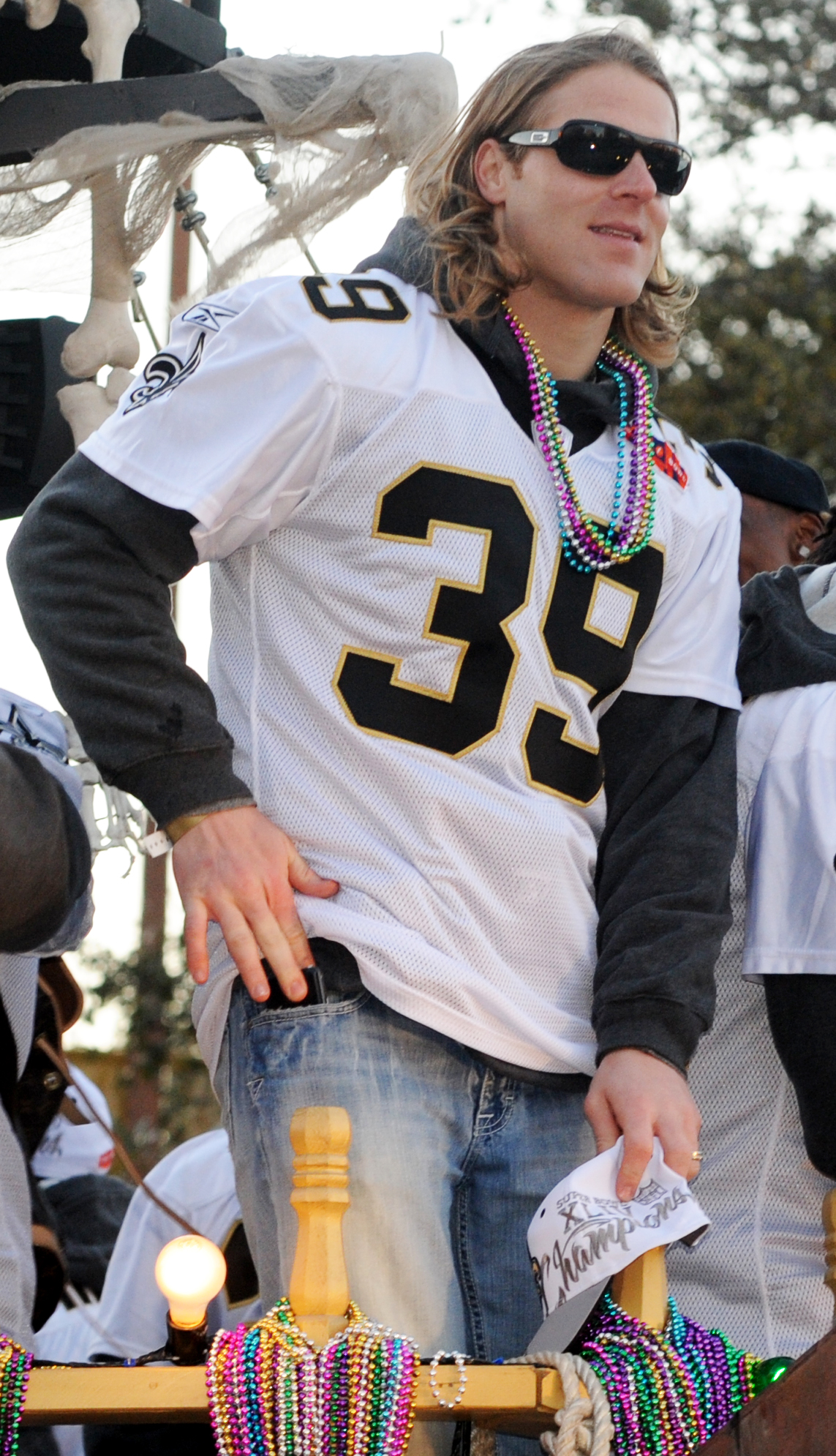

No. 39
- Position: Safety

Personal information
- Born: September 19, 1983 (age 43); Roswell, Georgia, U.S.
- Listed height: 6 ft 1 in (1.85 m)
- Listed weight: 210 lb (95 kg)

Career information
- High school: Roswell
- College: Georgia Tech
- NFL draft: 2006: undrafted

Career history
- Atlanta Falcons (2006)*; Cologne Centurions (2007); New Orleans Saints (2007–2010)
- * Offseason or practice squad member only

Awards and highlights
- Super Bowl champion XLIV); NFL Europe All-World Team (2007)

Career NFL statistics
- Total tackles: 48
- Sacks: 1
- Forced fumbles: 1
- Fumble recoveries: 1
- Interceptions: 1
- Stats at Pro Football Reference

Chris Reis (born September 19, 1983) is an American former professional football player who was a safety for the New Orleans Saints of the National Football League (NFL). He was signed by the Atlanta Falcons as an undrafted free agent in 2006. He played college football for the Georgia Tech Yellow Jackets and played high school football for Roswell High School. In 2007, he also played in the NFL Europe as safety for the Cologne Centurions where he was named to the 2007 NFL Europe All-World Team.

== Career ==
Reis played a central role in a crucial play during Super Bowl XLIV. With the Saints trailing the Indianapolis Colts 10–6 at the beginning of the second half, Saints head coach Sean Payton unexpectedly called for an onside kick by rookie punter and kickoff specialist Thomas Morstead. The kick bounced off the Colts' Hank Baskett, and a fierce battle for the ball ensued. The officials eventually ruled that the Saints had recovered the ball: although Jonathan Casillas was officially credited with the recovery, Casillas and other Saints players said it was actually Reis who did so. The play was considered a key turning point in the Saints' eventual 31–17 win.

Reis suffered a shoulder injury in Week 4 of the 2010 season and was put on IR afterwards. Reis was cut from the Saints on September 3, 2011.

Reis is a Christian, who pastors at Our Savior's Church Youngsville campus in Louisiana and has four children.
