= 2006 Washington Redskins season =

NFL team season

- Owner: Daniel Snyder
- General manager: Vinny Cerrato
- President: Joe Gibbs
- Head coach: Joe Gibbs
- Offensive coordinator: Al Saunders
- Defensive coordinator: Gregg Williams
- Home stadium: FedExField

Results
- Record: 5–11
- Division place: 4th NFC East
- Playoffs: Did not qualify
- All-Pros: None
- Pro Bowlers: OT Chris Samuels; FS Sean Taylor

The 2006 season was the Washington Redskins' 75th in the National Football League (NFL), and the third under head coach Joe Gibbs since his return to the team in 2004.

The team had posted a 10–6 record and a postseason berth the previous season (up from 6–10 in 2004). In 2006, however, the Redskins posted only five wins and finished last in the division.

The 2006 Redskins set an NFL record for fewest takeaways in a (non-strike) NFL season, with only twelve.

== Offseason ==
After the end of the 2005 season, the Redskins were reported to be $20 million over the salary cap. However, due to the NFL and NFL Players' Union agreement the salary cap was raised to $102 million and LaVar Arrington paying $4.4 million of his salary back, Washington managed to get under the cap.

The Redskins released 3-time Pro Bowl linebacker LaVar Arrington and starting safeties Ryan Clark and Matt Bowen.

The Redskins signed the following free agents: wide receiver Antwaan Randle El, defensive end Andre Carter, strong safety Adam Archuleta, and tight end Christian Fauria. They also traded draft picks for wide receiver Brandon Lloyd, quarterback Todd Collins and running back T. J. Duckett

In the 2006 NFL draft, the Redskins did not have a first round pick due to a 2005 trade used to acquire quarterback Jason Campbell. However, they traded up in the second round to draft linebacker Rocky McIntosh out of the University of Miami, who was slated to be the replacement for Arrington. The Redskins then used their next pick on Minnesota DT Anthony Montgomery. The rest of their picks included Northern Colorado Safety Reed Doughty, Georgia DT Kedric Golston, Arizona Guard Kili Lefotu, and Tennessee LB Kevin Simon (who was later cut).

The Redskins finished the 2006 preseason with a record of 0–4, losing to the Cincinnati Bengals 19–3, the New York Jets 27–14, the New England Patriots 41–0 and the Baltimore Ravens 17–10. Starting running back Clinton Portis was injured in the first game of the preseason. The Redskins scored the fewest points of any team in the preseason.

The Redskins severed long-standing ties with radio station WJFK-FM for broadcasting rights to Redskins games. The new flagship station is Triple X ESPN Radio, which consists of three simulcast frequencies that cover the greater Washington, D.C. area.

== Staff ==
2006 Washington Redskins staff
Front office: Owner – Daniel Snyder; Vice president of football operations – Joe Mendes; Vice president of football operations – Pepper Rodgers; Director of player personnel – Vinny Cerrato; Head coaches: Head coach – Joe Gibbs; Associate head coach – offense – Al Saunders; Assistant head coach – offense – Joe Bugel; Assistant head coach – defense – Gregg Williams; Offensive coaches: Offensive coordinator – Don Breaux; Quarterbacks – Bill Lazor; Running backs – Earnest Byner; Wide receivers – Stan Hixon; Tight ends – Rennie Simmons; Offensive assistant – Jack Burns; Quality control – Coy Gibbs	Defensive coaches: Defensive coordinator/defensive line – Greg Blache; Passing Game Coordinator/safeties– Steve Jackson; Linebackers – Dale Lindsey; Secondary/corners – Jerry Gray; Special teams coaches: Special teams – Danny Smith; Defensive line/special teams – Kirk Olivadotti; Strength and conditioning: Strength and conditioning – John Hastings; Assistant strength and conditioning – Bobby Crumpler; Assistant strength and conditioning – Tony Spinosa

== Draft ==
2006 Washington Redskins draft
Round	Pick	Player	Position	College	Notes
2	35	Rocky McIntosh	LB	Miami (FL)	From NY Jets
5	153	Anthony Montgomery	DT	Minnesota	
6	173	Reed Doughty	S	Northern Colorado	From NY Jets
6	196	Kedric Golston	DT	Georgia	
7	230	Kili Lefotu	G	Arizona	
7	250	Kevin Simon	LB	Tennessee	
Made roster † Pro Football Hall of Fame * Made at least one Pro Bowl during career

== Roster ==
2006 Washington Redskins roster
Quarterbacks (QB): 8 Mark Brunell; 17 Jason Campbell; 15 Todd Collins; Running backs (RB): 46 Ladell Betts; 30 Nehemiah Broughton; 31 Rock Cartwright; 36 T. J. Duckett; 45 Mike Sellers FB; Wide receivers (WR): 11 Mike Espy; 85 Brandon Lloyd; 89 Santana Moss; 80 David Patten; 82 Antwaan Randle El; 83 James Thrash; Tight ends (TE): 47 Chris Cooley; 86 Brian Kozlowski; 87 Todd Yoder	Offensive linemen (OL): 66 Derrick Dockery G; 76 Jon Jansen T; 69 Jim Molinaro T; 62 Mike Pucillo C/G; 61 Casey Rabach C; 60 Chris Samuels T; 77 Randy Thomas G; 74 Todd Wade T; 72 Taylor Whitley G; Defensive linemen (DL): 73 Ryan Boschetti DT; 99 Andre Carter DE; 93 Phillip Daniels DE; 92 Demetric Evans DE; 64 Kedric Golston DT; 96 Cornelius Griffin DT; 94 Anthony Montgomery DT; 95 Joe Salave'a DT; 78 Joe Sykes DE; 97 Renaldo Wynn DE	Linebackers (LB): 57 Warrick Holdman OLB; 98 Lemar Marshall MLB; 52 Rocky McIntosh OLB; 58 Jeff Posey OLB; Defensive backs (DB): 40 Adam Archuleta SS; 23 Reed Doughty FS; 34 John Eubanks CB; 39 Vernon Fox SS; 32 Ade Jimoh CB; 22 Carlos Rogers CB; 21 Sean Taylor FS; 29 Leigh Torrence CB; 23 Troy Vincent SS; 25 Kenny Wright CB; Special teams (ST): 71 Ethan Albright LS; 4 Derrick Frost P; 6 Shaun Suisham K	Practice squad: 79 Lorenzo Alexander DT; 75 Calvin Armstrong T; 91 Jamaal Green DE; 12 Steven Harris WR; 18 Ryan Hoag WR; 51 Anthony Trucks LB; 68 Sam Wilder T; Reserve: 50 Khary Campbell LB (IR); -- Kerry Carter FB (IR); 88 Christian Fauria TE (IR); 10 John Hall K (IR); 26 Clinton Portis RB (IR); 20 Pierson Prioleau S (IR); 24 Shawn Springs CB (IR); 53 Marcus Washington LB (IR); Rookies in italics 53 active, 8 reserve, 7 practice squad

== Preseason ==
Week	Date	Opponent	Result	Record	Venue	Attendance	NFL.com recap
1	August 13	at Cincinnati Bengals	L 3–19	0–1	Paul Brown Stadium	64,961	Recap
2	August 19	New York Jets	L 14–27	0–2	FedExField	65,538	Recap
3	August 26	at New England Patriots	L 0–41	0–3	Gillette Stadium	68,756	Recap
4	August 31	Baltimore Ravens	L 10–17	0–4	FedExField	60,326	Recap

== Schedule ==
Week	Date	Opponent	Result	Record	Venue	Attendance	NFL.com recap
1	September 11	Minnesota Vikings	L 16–19	0–1	FedExField	90,608	Recap
2	September 17	at Dallas Cowboys	L 10–27	0–2	Texas Stadium	63,152	Recap
3	September 24	at Houston Texans	W 31–15	1–2	Reliant Stadium	70,069	Recap
4	October 1	Jacksonville Jaguars	W 36–30 (OT)	2–2	FedExField	89,450	Recap
5	October 8	at New York Giants	L 3–19	2–3	Giants Stadium	78,653	Recap
6	October 15	Tennessee Titans	L 22–25	2–4	FedExField	88,550	Recap
7	October 22	at Indianapolis Colts	L 22–36	2–5	RCA Dome	57,274	Recap
8	Bye						
9	November 5	Dallas Cowboys	W 22–19	3–5	Fedex Field	90,250	Recap
10	November 12	at Philadelphia Eagles	L 3–27	3–6	Lincoln Financial Field	69,143	Recap
11	November 19	at Tampa Bay Buccaneers	L 17–20	3–7	Raymond James Stadium	65,699	Recap
12	November 26	Carolina Panthers	W 17–13	4–7	FedExField	85,450	Recap
13	December 3	Atlanta Falcons	L 14–24	4–8	FedExField	86,436	Recap
14	December 10	Philadelphia Eagles	L 19–21	4–9	FedExField	84,164	Recap
15	December 17	at New Orleans Saints	W 16–10	5–9	Louisiana Superdome	69,052	Recap
16	December 24	at St. Louis Rams	L 31–37 (OT)	5–10	Edward Jones Dome	62,324	Recap
17	December 30	New York Giants	L 28–34	5–11	FedExField	86,141	Recap

== Regular season ==
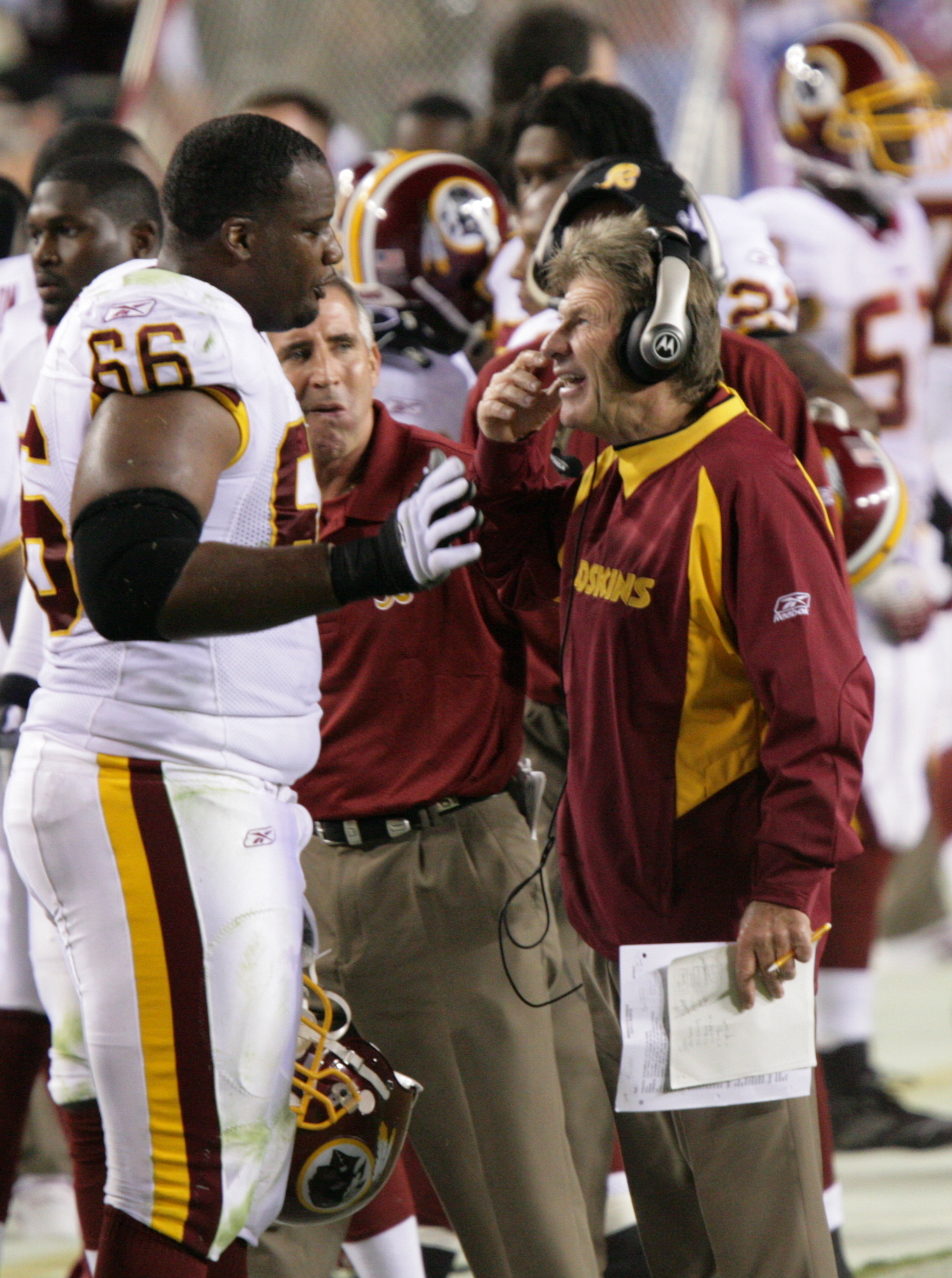
Derrick Dockery (left) during the Minnesota game in week 1

=== Week 1: vs. Minnesota Vikings ===
	1	2	3	4	Total
Vikings	6	3	7	3	19
Redskins	3	10	3	0	16

at FedExField, Landover, Maryland

The Redskins started the regular season against the Minnesota Vikings at home on September 11, in the first game of an ESPN Monday Night Football doubleheader on opening weekend. The Redskins defense allowed Minnesota quarterback Brad Johnson and the Vikings' offense to convert often on third down, and the Vikings won the game 19–16 after a failed field goal attempt by John Hall late in the fourth quarter quieted any chance of a Redskins comeback. With the loss, the Redskins were 0–1.Stats

=== Week 2: at Dallas Cowboys ===
	1	2	3	4	Total
Redskins	0	10	0	0	10
Cowboys	10	7	0	10	27

at Texas Stadium, Dallas, Texas

The Redskins traveled to Texas Stadium in Irving, Texas to take on one of their NFC East rivals, the Dallas Cowboys in a Sunday night match-up. The Redskins trailed early, as Dallas kicker Mike Vanderjagt completed a 26-yard field goal and Drew Bledsoe completed a 4-yard TD pass to WR Patrick Crayton in the first quarter. In the second quarter, kicker John Hall would get Washington a 39-yard field goal, but Dallas responded with RB Marion Barber's 1-yard TD run. RB Rock Cartwright would return a kickoff 100 yards for a TD, but that would be the last time in the entire game that Redskins would score a single point. Even though there wouldn't be a single point scored in the third quarter, the Cowboys sealed the win with a 40-yard TD pass to WR Terry Glenn and a 50-yard field goal by Vanderjagt. With the loss, the Redskins dropped to 0–2. Stats

=== Week 3: at Houston Texans ===
	1	2	3	4	Total
Redskins	7	14	7	3	31
Texans	7	0	0	8	15

at Reliant Stadium, Houston, Texas

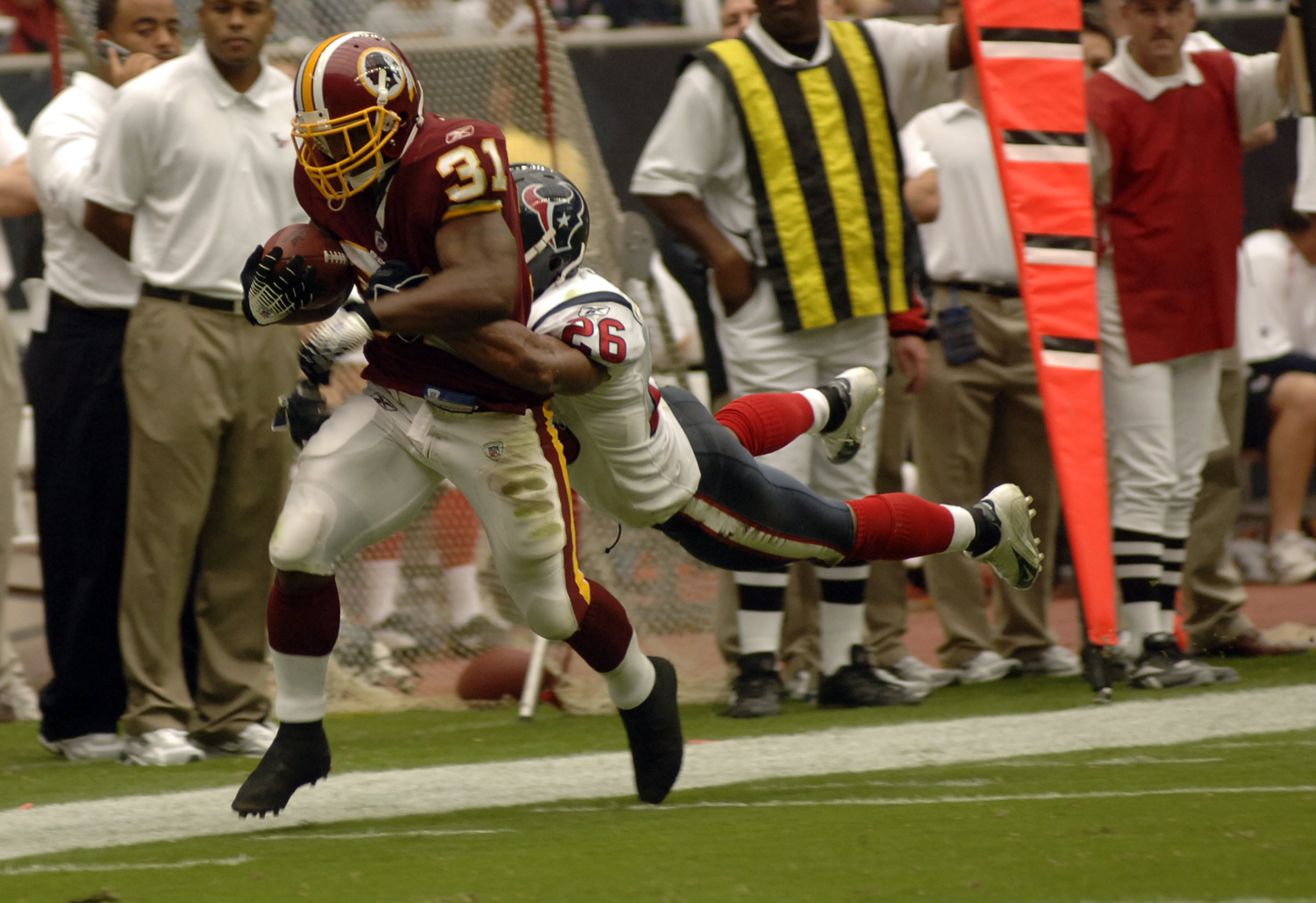
Rock Cartwright is tackled by Houston's Glenn Earl, during week 3 of 2006

The Washington Redskins defeated the Houston Texans by the score of 31–15. Washington quarterback Mark Brunell set a new NFL record for consecutive completed passes in one game by completing his first 22 pass attempts against the Texans' defense. Brunell finished 24 of 27 passes for 269 yards and one touchdown. Newly signed Redskins receiver Antwaan Randle El scored his first touchdown of the season. Clinton Portis rushed for 89 yards and two touchdowns. Ladell Betts finished with 124 rushing yards and one touchdown. With their first win of the season, the Redskins moved to 1–2.Stats

=== Week 4: vs. Jacksonville Jaguars ===
	1	2	3	4	OT	Total
Jaguars	10	7	0	13	0	30
Redskins	7	6	7	10	6	36

at FedExField, Landover, Maryland

The Redskins welcomed Byron Leftwich and the rest of the Jacksonville Jaguars to FedExField. Mark Brunell passed for 329 yards, three touchdown passes (all to WR Santana Moss), and one interception. The Redskins came up with 153 total rushing yards, as Clinton Portis led the team with 112 rushing yards and one touchdown. The defense forced one interception from Leftwich, logged four sacks, and allowed only 33 rushing yards. John Hall was 3 for 3 on field goals and extra points. The game ended in overtime when Brunell threw a 68-yard game-winning touchdown pass to Moss. With the win, the Redskins moved to 2–2.Stats

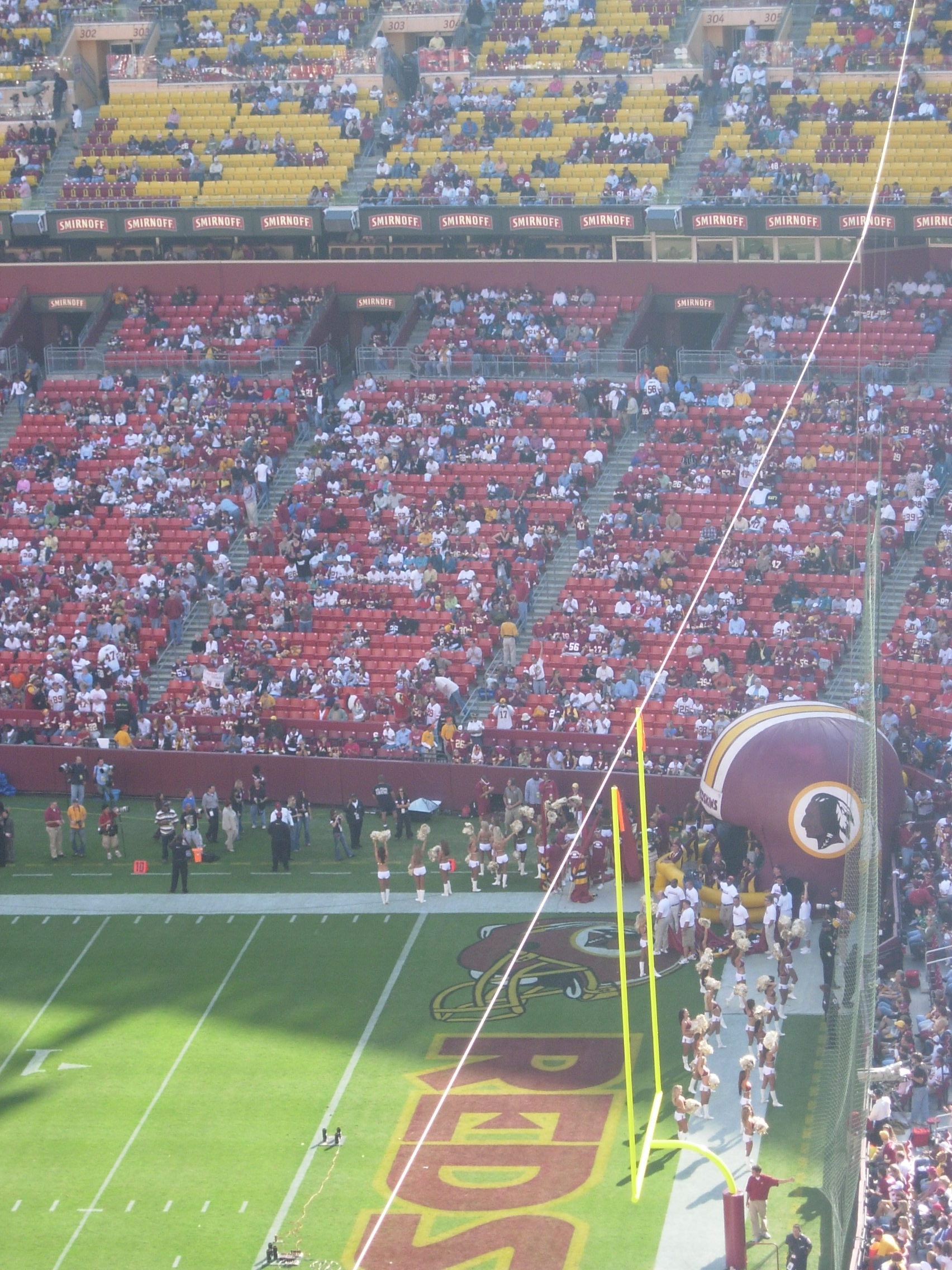
Game buildup in week 4

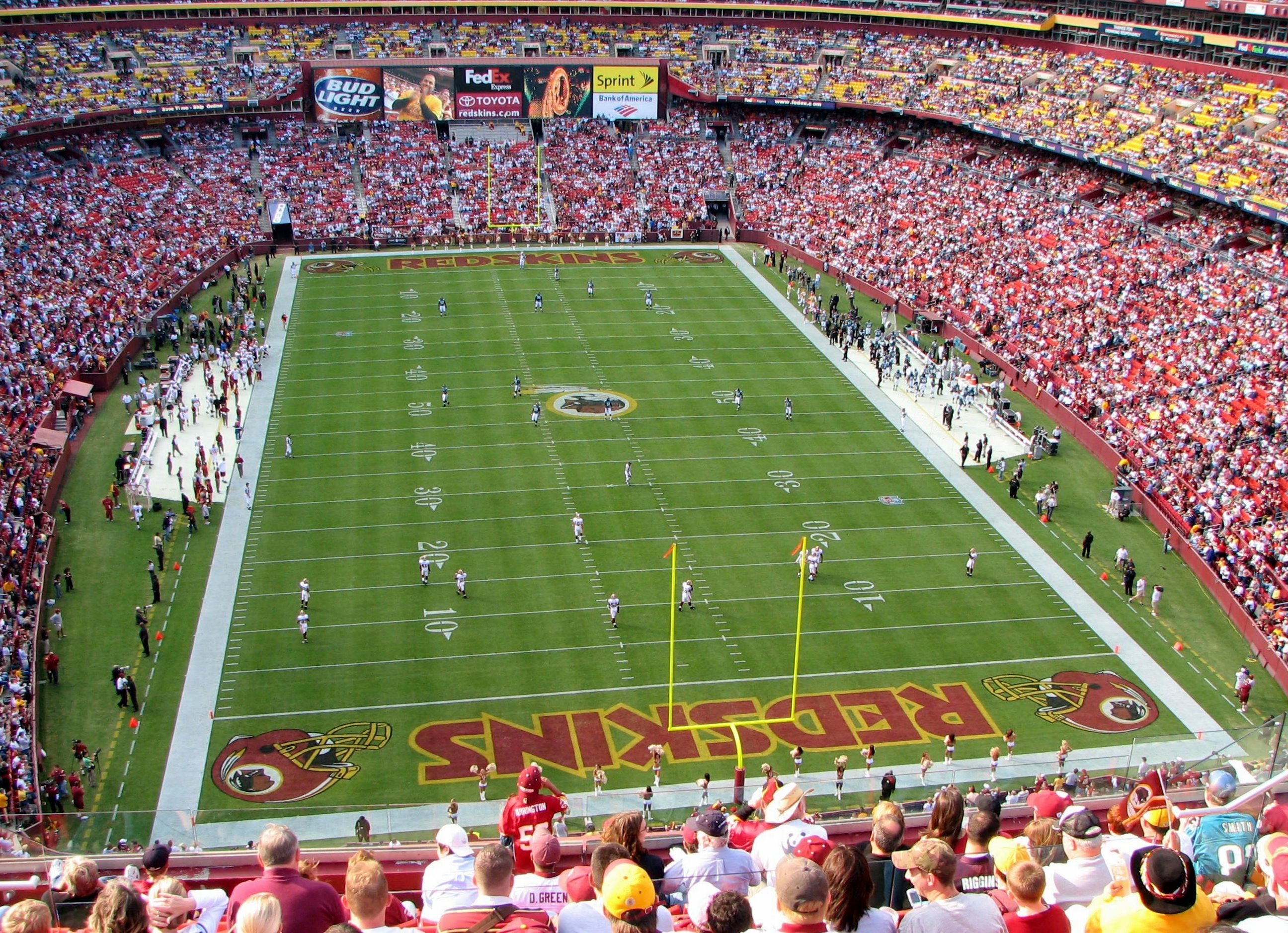
FedExField before a kick-off against Jacksonville

=== Week 5: at New York Giants ===
	1	2	3	4	Total
Redskins	3	0	0	0	3
Giants	0	9	7	3	19

at Giants Stadium, East Rutherford, New Jersey

Mark Brunell and the Redskins marched into Giants Stadium with a victory in mind. It ended up being misery within three hours, as they lost to a team who, at the time, had a poorly rated defense. Clinton Portis rushed for 76 yards. Santana Moss caught 3 receptions for only 39 yards, while Chris Cooley beat out Santana Moss with 4 receptions for 41 yards. Total offense for the Redskins was 164 yards, while the New York Giants put up 411 yards. The Redskins defense ended up with no sacks, interceptions, or turnovers. John Hall was 1/2 on field goals with no PATs. With another loss, the Redskins dropped to 2–3. Stats

=== Week 6: vs Tennessee Titans ===
	1	2	3	4	Total
Titans	3	10	9	3	25
Redskins	7	7	0	8	22

at FedExField, Landover, Maryland

Hoping to rebound from their road loss to the Giants, the Redskins returned home for a Week 6 fight with the Tennessee Titans. In the first quarter, Washington trailed early as Tennessee kicker Rob Bironas kicked a 32-yard field goal. RB Clinton Portis got a 10-yard TD run to help the Redskins regain the lead. In the second quarter, the Skins increased their lead with QB Mark Brunell completing a 24-yard TD pass to TE Chris Cooley. However, the Titans regained the lead with Bironas nailing a 26-yard field goal and QB Vince Young completing a 3-yard TD pass to WR Brandon Jones. In the third quarter, the Redskins continued to dig themselves a huge hole, as RB Travis Henry got a 2-yard TD run. Afterwards, the Titans got a safety on a blocked punt that rolled out the back of the end zone. In the fourth quarter, Washington tried valiantly to fight back, as Portis got a 4-yard TD run, but in the end, Bironas got a 30-yard field goal for Tennessee and a late interception by Free Safety Lamont Thompson killed any chance of a comeback. With the loss, the Redskins fell to 2–4. Stats

=== Week 7: at Indianapolis Colts ===
	1	2	3	4	Total
Redskins	0	14	0	8	22
Colts	7	6	20	3	36

at the RCA Dome, Indianapolis, Indiana

The Redskins started the game looking to prevent Peyton Manning from overwhelming their defense, and hoping to drive the ball in a more effective manner. What was a close game at the half however quickly degenerated into a blood bath in the 3rd quarter as Peyton Manning connected on 3 touchdown passes to seal the deal. Overall, the offense again looked confused, and surprisingly it was the defense of the Redskins that ended up giving up big running plays on a regular basis. With the loss, the Redskins dropped to 2–5 for the season. Stats

=== Week 9: vs. Dallas Cowboys ===
	1	2	3	4	Total
Cowboys	0	12	7	0	19
Redskins	5	7	0	10	22

at FedExField, Landover, Maryland

Coming off their Bye Week, the Redskins avenged their Week 2 loss by defeating the Dallas Cowboys after a wild final minute of the fourth quarter which ended with a game-winning 47-yard field goal by kicker Nick Novak. With less than a minute left in the fourth quarter, Novak missed from 49 yards. With nine seconds left Dallas kicker Mike Vanderjagt's field goal was blocked by newly signed Redskins cornerback Troy Vincent, and recovered by Redskins free safety Sean Taylor, who ran the ball down to the Dallas 45-yard line as time expired. During the runback by Taylor, Dallas offensive lineman Kyle Kosier grabbed his facemask and pulled it, adding an additional fifteen yards to the play and, since the penalty was defensive in nature, extended regulation by one additional play as a period cannot end on a defensive penalty according to NFL rules. Novak then came back out to hit the game winner and give the Redskons their third win of the year.Stats

=== Week 10: at Philadelphia Eagles ===
	1	2	3	4	Total
Redskins	0	3	0	0	3
Eagles	10	7	10	0	27

at Lincoln Financial Field, Philadelphia

In their first game against the Eagles, the Redskins lost in convincing fashion, 27–3. Although they dominated the time of possession in the first half and had several long drives, they came away with only three points. On the other hand, the Eagles had several big plays which resulted in scores, including a second half interception for a touchdown. With the loss the Redskins fell to 3–6.Stats

On the Monday after this game, it was announced that quarterback Mark Brunell was being benched in favor of second-year quarterback Jason Campbell.

=== Week 11: at Tampa Bay Buccaneers ===
	1	2	3	4	Total
Redskins	3	0	7	7	17
Buccaneers	3	0	7	10	20

at Raymond James Stadium, Tampa, Florida

New starting quarterback Jason Campbell played his first game at the Tampa Bay Buccaneers. Only field goal points took the first half, with both teams tied at halftime 3–3. In the second half Jason Campbell threw a three-yard touchdown pass to TE Chris Cooley, then Bruce Gradkowski threw a three-yard touchdown pass intended for Galloway but instead bounced off him into Becht's hands, making the game tied in the third quarter 10–10. Though the Redskins performed fairly well in the fourth quarter, Jason Campbell throwing another touchdown pass to Yoder, the Buccaneers had already pulled ahead by ten points. The final score was 20–17, Bucs, dropping the Redskins to 3–7. Stats

=== Week 12: vs. Carolina Panthers ===
	1	2	3	4	Total
Panthers	3	3	0	7	13
Redskins	0	3	7	7	17

at FedExField, Landover, Maryland

In his first game at home as the starter for the Redskins, Jason Campbell, again, had an encouraging game completing 11 of 23 passes for 118 yards and two touchdowns. A rather dull first half for both teams saw the scoreboard read 6–3 in favor of Carolina. In the second half Jason Campbell threw a four-yard touchdown pass to Antwaan Randle El and the Redskins took the lead at 10–6. In the fourth quarter Steve Smith scored on an 8-yard pass from Jake Delhomme to give Carolina a 13–10 lead. Later in the fourth quarter Jason Campbell threw to Chris Cooley for a 66-yard touchdown giving the Redskins the lead for good. Carolina threatened near the end of the game, but a Jake Delhomme pass was intercepted in the endzone by Redskins Safety Sean Taylor. With the 17–13 victory, the Redskins record stood at 4–7. Stats

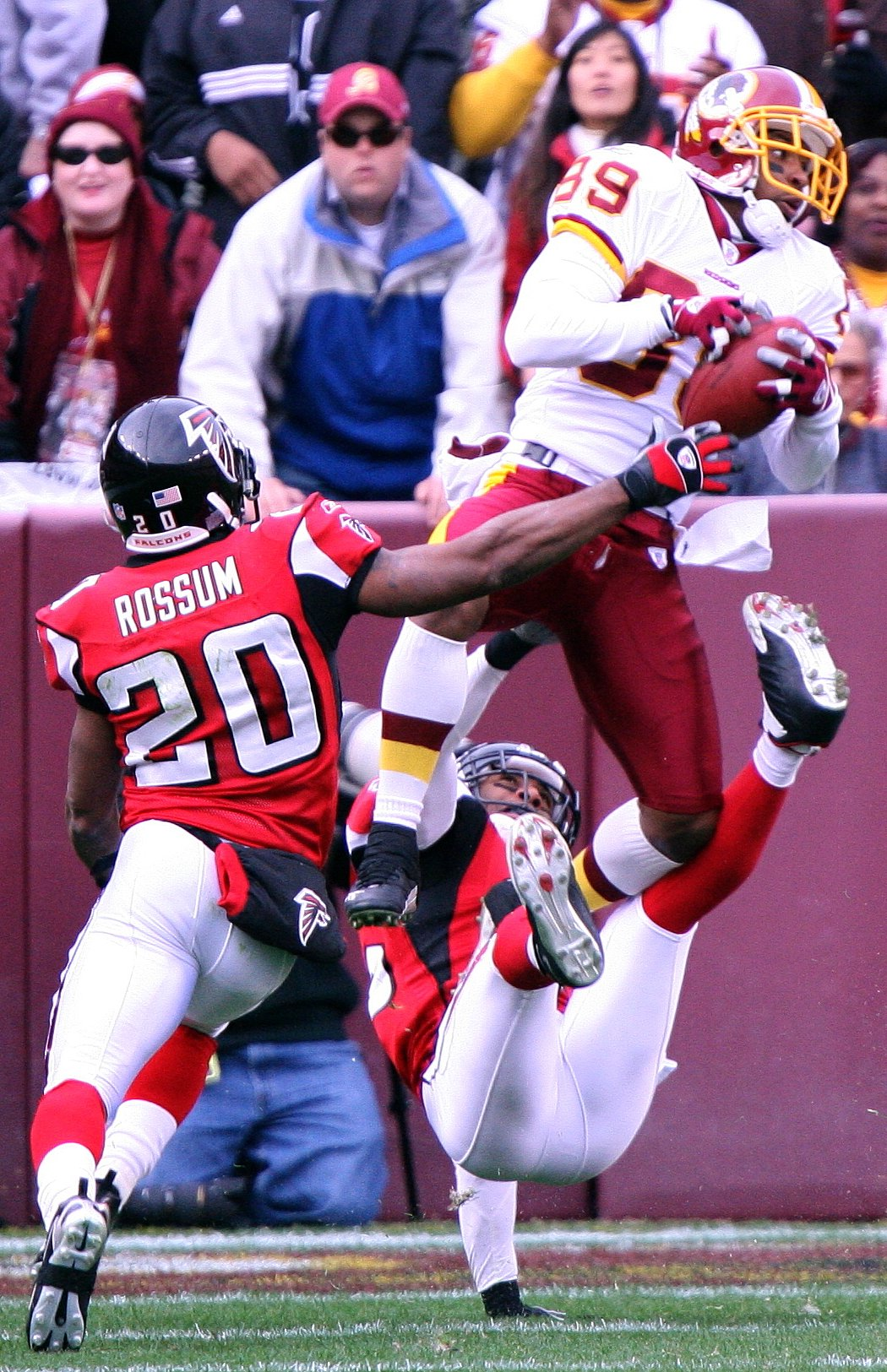
Santana Moss catches against Atlanta

=== Week 13: vs. Atlanta Falcons ===
	1	2	3	4	Total
Falcons	0	10	7	7	24
Redskins	14	0	0	0	14

at FedExField, Landover, Maryland

Coming off their impressive victory over the Panthers, the Redskins stayed at home a Week 13 fight with the Atlanta Falcons. In the first quarter, the Redskins started strong with RB Ladell Betts getting an 8-yard TD run, while QB Jason Campbell completed a 42-yard TD pass to WR Santana Moss. In the second quarter, the Falcons started catching up with kicker Morten Andersen's 34-yard field goal and QB Michael Vick's 16-yard TD pass to TE Alge Crumpler. In the third quarter, Washington lost its lead with Vick's 22-yard TD pass to WR Michael Jenkins for the only score of the period. In the fourth quarter, the Redskins fell when RB Jerious Norwood ran 69 yards for a touchdown. With the loss, Washington fell to 4–8. Stats

=== Week 14: vs. Philadelphia Eagles ===
	1	2	3	4	Total
Eagles	7	14	0	0	21
Redskins	3	3	10	3	19

at FedExField, Landover, Maryland

Coming off a disappointing home loss over the Falcons, the Redskins stayed at home for an NFC East rematch with the Philadelphia Eagles. In the first quarter, Washington struck first with kicker Shaun Suisham nailing a 31-yard field goal. However, the Eagles struck back with QB Jeff Garcia getting a 10-yard TD pass to TE L.J. Smith. In the second quarter, things got worse for the Redskins as strong safety Michael Lewis returned an interception 84 yards for a touchdown, while Garcia hooked up with WR Donte' Stallworth on a 3-yard TD pass. Afterwards, Suisham would kick a 45-yard field goal. In the third quarter, Washington started to come back with Suisham kicking a 32-yard field goal, while QB Jason Campbell completed a 34-yard TD pass to WR Antwaan Randle El. However, in the fourth quarter, the only thing left of the Redskins' comeback was Suisham's 35-yard field goal. Afterwards, the Eagles' offense squashed any hope of a Washington comeback. With the loss, the Redskins fell to 4–9 clinching last place in the NFC East. Stats

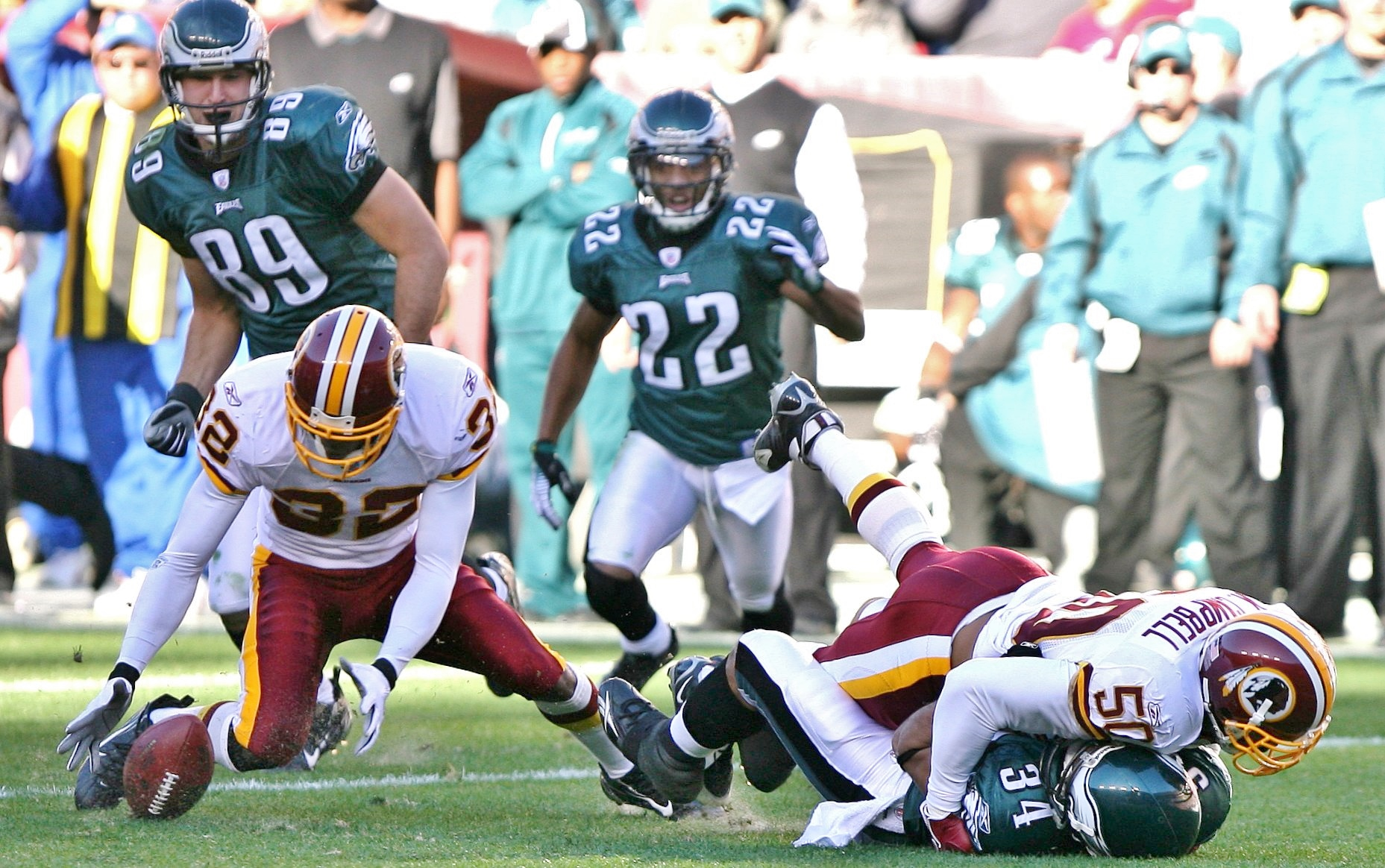
Ade Jimoh recovers a fumble against Philadelphia

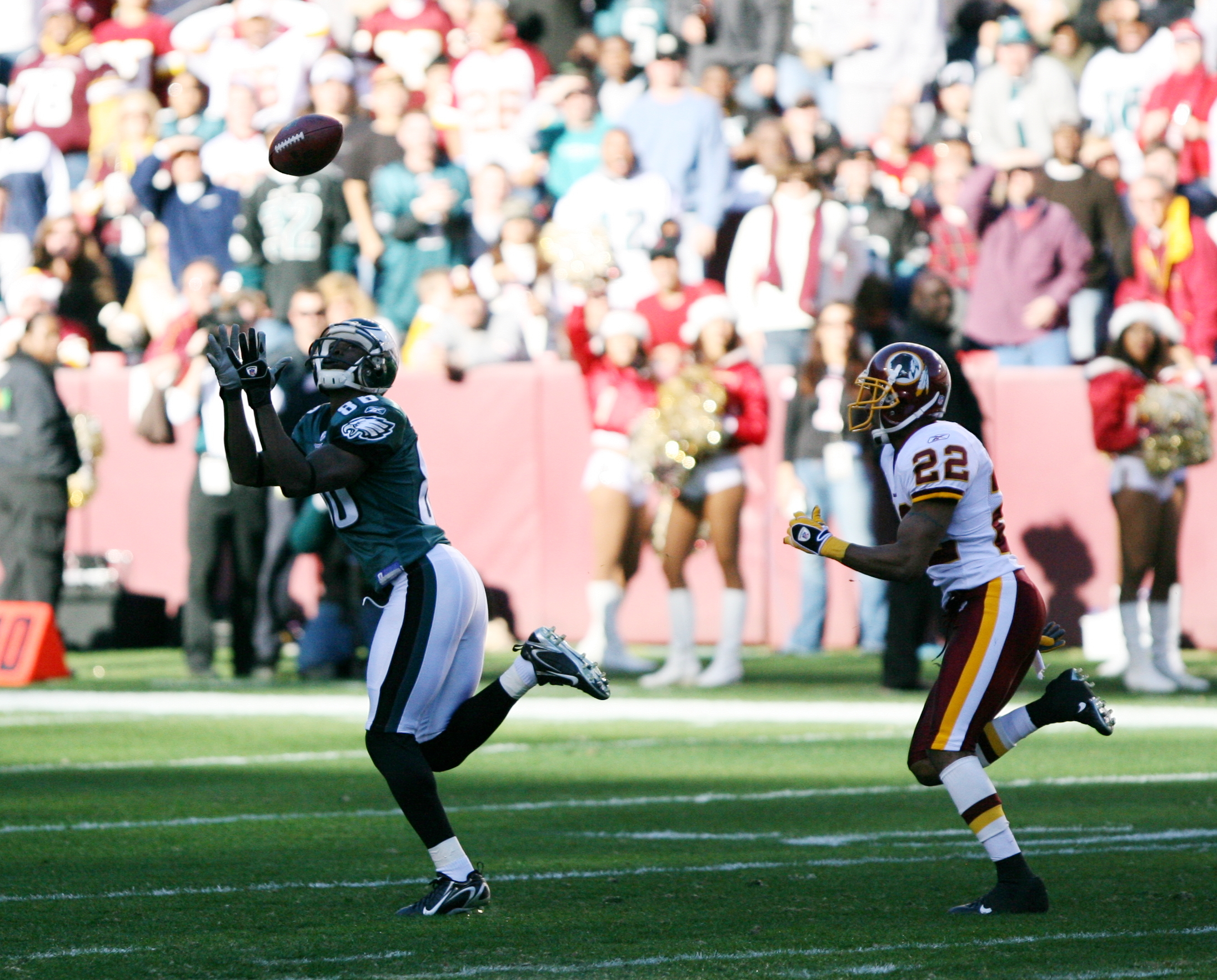
Philadelphia's Reggie Brown goes for a catch

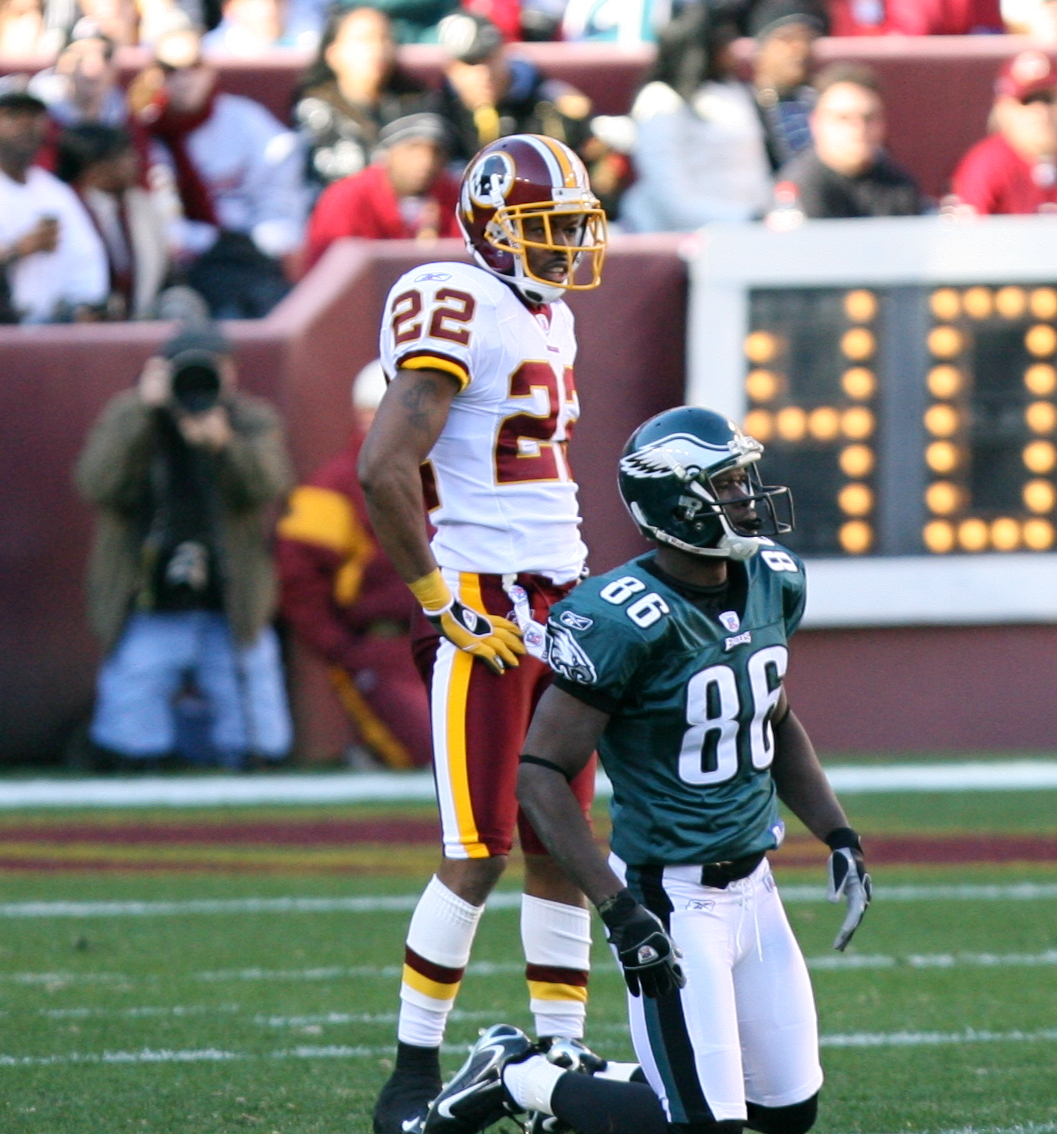
Reggie Brown down against Washington's defense

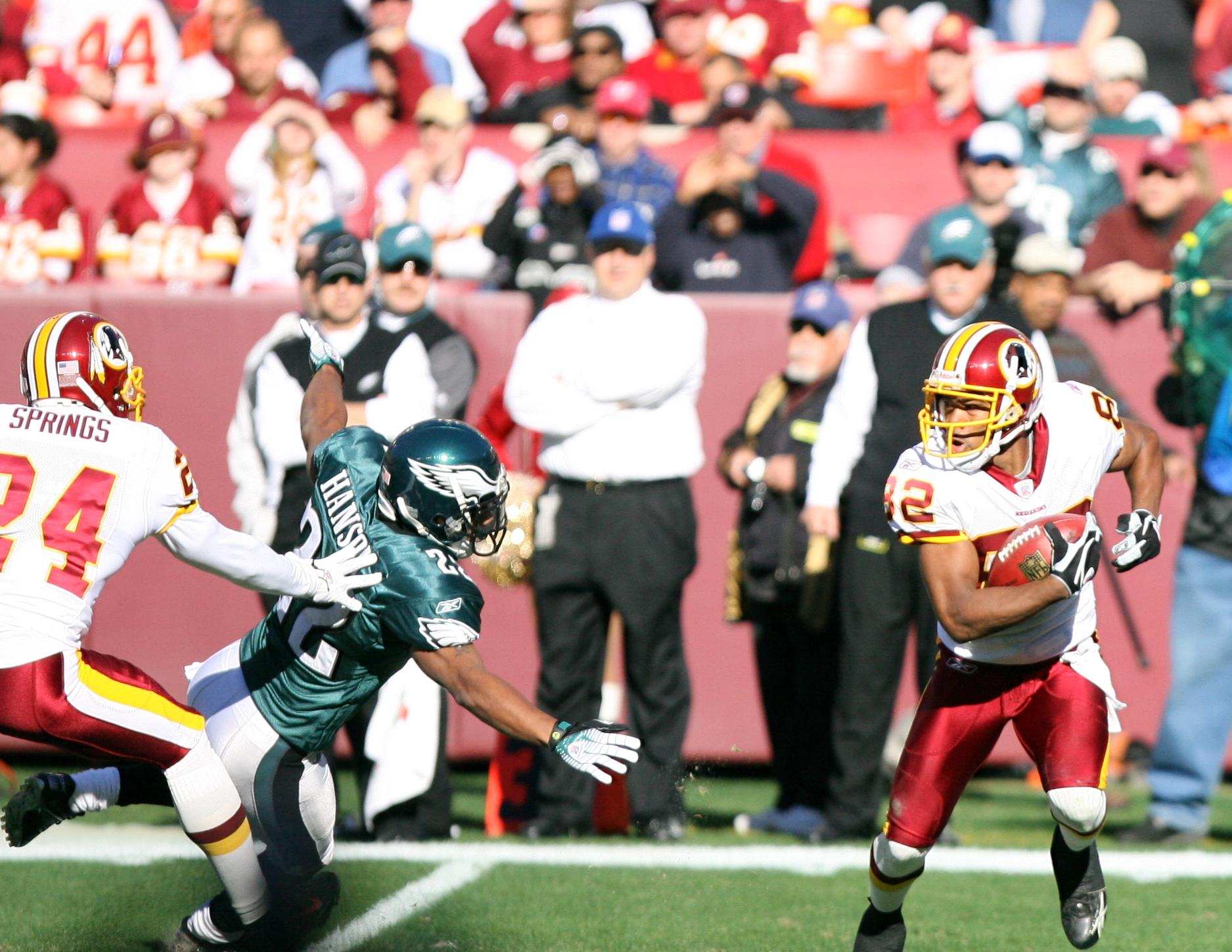
The Redskins on offense

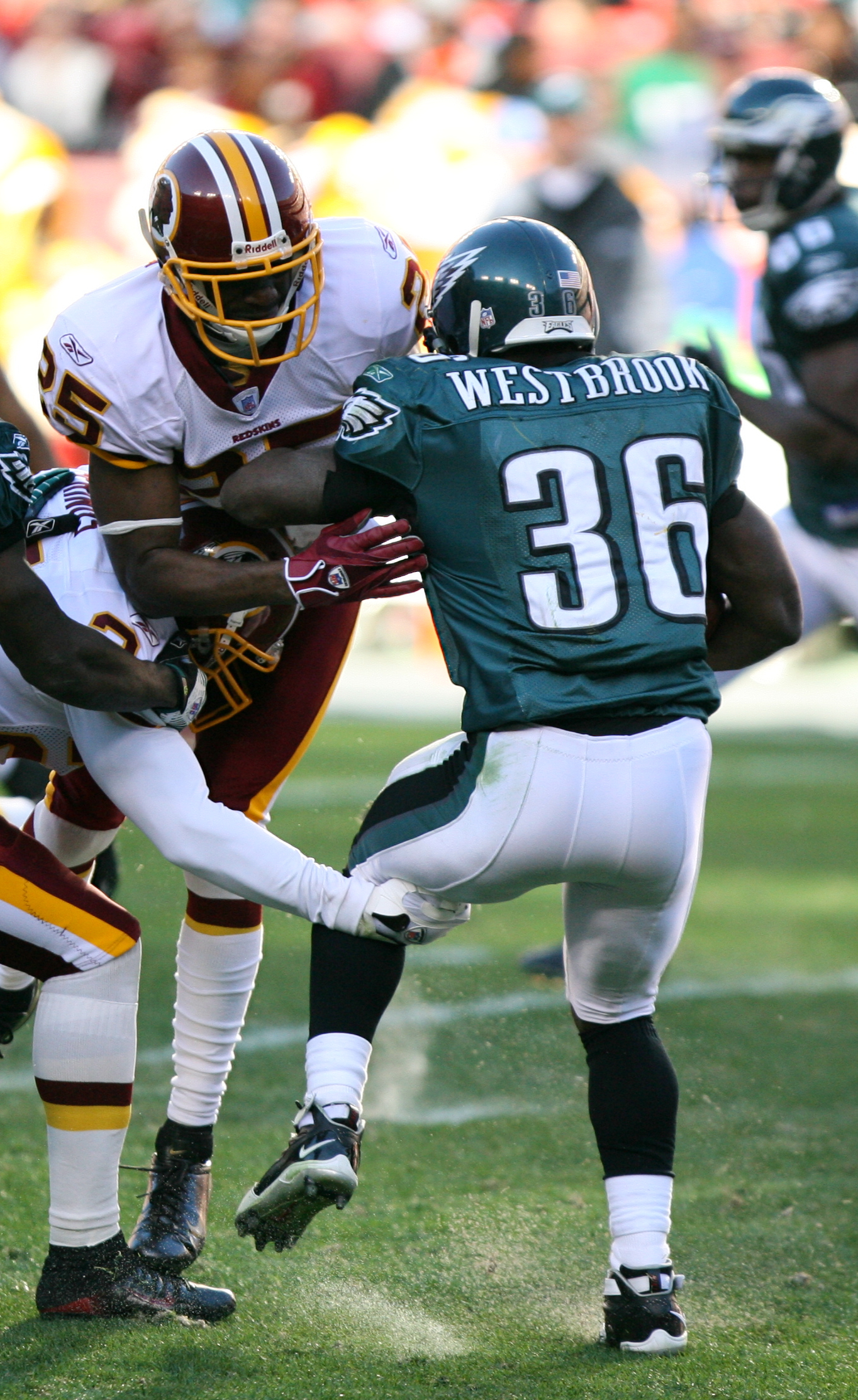
Washington tackles Brian Westbrook

=== Week 15: at New Orleans Saints ===
	1	2	3	4	Total
Redskins	10	3	0	3	16
Saints	0	7	0	3	10

at the Louisiana Superdome, New Orleans, Louisiana

Hoping to rebound from their home loss to the Eagles, the Redskins flew to the Louisiana Superdome for a Week 15 intraconference fight with the New Orleans Saints. In the first quarter, Washington started off strong as kicker Shaun Suisham nailed a 37-yard field goal, while QB Jason Campbell completed a 31-yard TD pass to WR Santana Moss. In the second quarter, the Saints started to fight back as RB Deuce McAllister got a 1-yard TD run. Suisham increased Washington's lead with a 37-yard field goal. After a scoreless third quarter, New Orleans crept closer with kicker John Carney's 41-yard field goal. After Suisham's 22-yard field goal, the defense wrapped up the victory. With the win, the Redskins improved to 5–9. Stats

=== Week 16: at St. Louis Rams ===
	1	2	3	4	OT	Total
Redskins	7	14	7	3	0	31
Rams	0	14	14	3	6	37

at the Edward Jones Dome, St. Louis, Missouri
Coming off a surprising road victory over the Saints, the Redskins flew to the Edward Jones Dome for a Week 16 fight with the St. Louis Rams. In the first quarter, the 'Skins struck first with RB T. J. Duckett's 5-yard TD run for the only score of the period. In the second quarter, the Rams took the lead with QB Marc Bulger completing a 10-yard TD pass to WR Isaac Bruce and a 27-yard TD pass to TE Dominique Byrd. Washington responded with RB Ladell Betts getting a 6-yard TD run and QB Jason Campbell completing a 9-yard TD pass to TE Chris Cooley. In the third quarter, the Redskins' lead increased with Betts' 7-yard TD run. However, St. Louis started rally with Bulger completing a 64-yard TD pass to RB Steven Jackson and a 10-yard TD pass to RB Stephen Davis. In the fourth quarter, the Rams took the lead with kicker Jeff Wilkins nailing a 21-yard field goal. The Washington forced overtime with kicker Shaun Shisham's 52-yard field goal. However, the 'Skins fell in overtime as Stephen Jackson delivered the game-winning 21-yard TD run for the Rams. With the loss, the Redskins fell to 5–10. Stats

=== Week 17: vs. New York Giants ===
	1	2	3	4	Total
Giants	3	17	7	7	34
Redskins	7	0	7	14	28

at FedExField, Landover, Maryland

Hoping to end their lackluster season on a high note, the Redskins went home for an NFC East rematch with the New York Giants on Saturday night. In the first quarter, the G-Men drew first blood with kicker Jay Feely's 34-yard field goal. The 'Skins would respond with a trick play, as QB Jason Campbell handed the ball off to WR Antwaan Randle El who completed a 48-yard TD pass to WR Santana Moss. However, in the second quarter, New York began to fight hard with RB Tiki Barber getting a 15-yard TD run and a 55-yard TD run. Afterwards, Feely would wrap up the half with a 31-yard field goal. In the third quarter, the Giants increased its lead with QB Eli Manning completing a 6-yard TD pass to WR Tim Carter. The Redskins responded with Campbell's 7-yard TD pass to RB Ladell Betts. In the fourth quarter, the 'Skins crept closer with RB T. J. Duckett's 1-yard TD run. However, New York responded with Barber's 50-yard TD run. Even though Washington responded with Campbell completing a 1-yard TD pass to TE Mike Sellers, the 'Skins fell short of a comeback. With the loss, the Redskins ended their season at 5–11. Stats

== Standings ==
NFC East
	W	L	T	PCT	DIV	CONF	PF	PA	STK
^{(3)} Philadelphia Eagles	10	6	0	.625	5–1	9–3	398	328	W5
^{(5)} Dallas Cowboys	9	7	0	.563	2–4	6–6	425	350	L2
^{(6)} New York Giants	8	8	0	.500	4–2	7–5	355	362	W1
Washington Redskins	5	11	0	.313	1–5	3–9	307	376	L2
