= McKinley Boykin =

American football player (born 1983)

No. 69, 68
- Position: Defensive tackle

Personal information
- Born: March 24, 1983 (age 43); Bessemer, Alabama, U.S.
- Listed height: 6 ft 1 in (1.85 m)
- Listed weight: 289 lb (131 kg)

Career information
- High school: McAdory (AL)
- College: Mississippi
- NFL draft: 2006: undrafted

Career history
- Cologne Centurions (2007); New Orleans Saints (2007); Florida Tuskers (2009–2010); Virginia Destroyers (2011)*; Orlando Predators (2012)*; Virginia Destroyers (2012)
- * Offseason or practice squad member only

Awards and highlights
- UFL champion (2011); Second-team All-SEC (2004)

Career NFL statistics
- Total tackles: 10
- Stats at Pro Football Reference

McKinley Boykin (born March 24, 1983) is an American former professional football player who was a defensive tackle for one season with the New Orleans Saints of the National Football League (NFL). He played college football for the Ole Miss Rebels and was signed by the Saints as an undrafted free agent in 2006.

Boykin was also a member of the Cologne Centurions, Florida Tuskers, Virginia Destroyers, and Orlando Predators.

== Professional career ==
=== New Orleans Saints ===
Boykin was allocated by the New Orleans Saints to NFL Europe in the spring of 2007 and played for the Cologne Centurions. He played in three regular season games in the NFL. Boykin tallied up 10 tackles in three games.

=== Florida Tuskers ===
Boykin was signed by the Florida Tuskers of the United Football League on August 17.

=== Virginia Destroyers ===
He was released on August 29, 2011.
