= Jerron Wishom =

American football player (born 1982)

No. 24
- Position: Cornerback

Personal information
- Born: March 1, 1982 (age 44); New Orleans, Louisiana, U.S.
- Listed height: 6 ft 0 in (1.83 m)
- Listed weight: 197 lb (89 kg)

Career information
- College: Louisiana Tech
- NFL draft: 2005: undrafted

Career history
- Houston Texans (2005)*; Green Bay Packers (2005); San Francisco 49ers (2006)*; Minnesota Vikings (2007)*; Cologne Centurions (2007); Dallas Cowboys (2008)*; Montreal Alouettes (2008)*; Saskatchewan Roughriders (2009)*; Orlando Predators (2010)*; Bossier-Shreveport Battle Wings (2010); New Orleans VooDoo (2011); Dallas Vigilantes (2011); Virginia Destroyers (2011)*; New Orleans VooDoo (2012)
- * Offseason or practice squad member only
- Stats at Pro Football Reference

Jerron Romalas Wishom (born March 1, 1982) is an American former professional football player who was a cornerback in the National Football League (NFL). He played college football for the Louisiana Tech Bulldogs and was signed by the Houston Texans as an undrafted free agent in 2005.

Wishom was also a member of the Green Bay Packers, San Francisco 49ers, Minnesota Vikings, Dallas Cowboys, Montreal Alouettes, Saskatchewan Roughriders, New Orleans VooDoo and Dallas Vigilantes.

== Early life ==
Jerron graduated from Lutcher High School in Lutcher, LA in 2000.
