= Bobby Blizzard =

American football player and coach (born 1980)

Chicago State Cougars
- Title: Offensive coordinator

Personal information
- Born: March 22, 1980 (age 46); Hampton, Virginia, U.S.
- Listed height: 6 ft 5 in (1.96 m)
- Listed weight: 255 lb (116 kg)

Career information
- High school: Hampton (Hampton, Virginia)
- College: Kentucky; North Carolina
- NFL draft: 2004: undrafted

Career history

Playing
- Pittsburgh Steelers (2004)*; Arizona Cardinals (2004)*; Hamburg Sea Devils (2005); Arizona Cardinals (2005)*; Baltimore Ravens (2005–2006)*; Cologne Centurions (2007); Cincinnati Bengals (2007)
- * Offseason or practice squad member only

Coaching
- McMurry (2012) Wide receivers coach & tight ends coach; McMurry (2013) Running backs coach; Belhaven (2014–2017) Offensive coordinator; Hampton (2018) Wide receivers coach; Memphis Express (2019) Wide receivers coach; Dallas Renegades (2020) Running backs coach; Norfolk State (2022) Running backs coach; Hampton (2023–2025) Wide receivers coach; Chicago State (2026) Offensive coordinator

Awards and highlights
- 2× NFL Europe All-Star (2005, 2007)

Bobby Blizzard (born March 22, 1980) is an American college football coach and former tight end. He is the wide receivers coach for Hampton University, a position he has held since 2023. He originally signed with the Pittsburgh Steelers as a college free agent out of North Carolina in 2004. Blizzard has also been a member of the Arizona Cardinals, Baltimore Ravens, and the Cincinnati Bengals.

== Early life ==
Blizzard attended Hampton High School in Virginia, where he was a two-sport start in football and basketball.

In football, he was a two-time All-American. As a senior, he was rated the #1 tight end in the nation, the #3 player in the state of Virginia, and #14 player overall in the Top 100 players in the country. Under head coach Mike Smith, Blizzard helped his team win three state championships and national championships as he lost only two games as a high schooler. Teammates of Blizzard's included future NFL players Ronald Curry, the #1 player in the state and the Gatorade National Football Player of the Year, and Marques Hagans, plus Canadian Football League player Almondo Curry.

Blizzard was also a two-time All-State basketball player, averaging 18.8 PPG, 10.3 rebounds per game, and 3 assists. He was one of Virginia's top basketball players in the state his junior and senior year as Hampton won a state championship in 1997. Ronald Curry was also a teammate of his in basketball, where Curry was the #1 player in the state of Virginia and McDonald's All-American.

Blizzard left high school as a 4-time State Champion (3-time State Champion and 2-time National Champion in football, 1 State Champion in basketball).

== College career ==
With Division I interest in both football and basketball, Blizzard decided to go to college to play college football. After initially committing to Virginia with Curry, he decided on the University of Kentucky. He played two years for the Wildcats, where he played in the 1999 Music City Bowl against Syracuse.

After Kentucky head coach Hal Mumme resigned following the 2000 season, Blizzard transferred to the University of North Carolina to play for the North Carolina Tar Heels. In Blizzard's first season with the Tar Heels, he led the team in touchdowns. Going into his senior year, he was rated one of the top tight ends in the country and was a preseason candidate for the John Mackey Award. However, he suffered from viral meningitis early in the season, followed by a torn calf muscle that further sidelined him.

Blizzard ended his college career with 78 receptions for 876 yards and six touchdowns, and was later invited to two Division I-A all-star games and the NFL Scouting Combine.

He received his bachelor's degree from UNC in sociology.

== Professional career ==
After going undrafted in the 2004 NFL draft, Blizzard signed with the Pittsburgh Steelers, but was released before the regular season began. He was eventually signed to the Arizona Cardinals, where he spent the entire 2004 season.

In summer 2005, Blizzard played for the Hamburg Sea Devils of NFL Europe, recording 34 receptions for two touchdowns. He was eventually voted to the NFL Europe All-Star Team. Upon the NFL season's arrival, Blizzard was injured in the preseason with the Cardinals, which sidelined him for much of the year and he was eventually waived/injured. In December, he was picked up by the Baltimore Ravens and placed on the practice squad. He was released on September 1, 2006.

Blizzard played for NFL Europa's Cologne Centurions in 2007. In 10 games, he led the team in receptions (38), receiving yardage (494) and touchdowns (six), also leading all tight ends in the league in every statistical category. He was voted to the All Europa All-Star Team.

He was picked up by the Cincinnati Bengals as a free agent in 2007, after the end of the NFL Europa season. On August 24, 2007, Blizzard had a season-ending back injury that ended his playing career.

== Coaching career ==
After his playing career ended, Blizzard became an assistant coach at Kecoughtan High School in 2010.

In 2012, Blizzard joined McMurry University, reuniting him with Mumme as he became the wide receivers/tight ends coach. That year, McMurray's receivers combined for 4,040 receiving yards, including 367.3 receiving yards per game, and 30 touchdowns. The following year, Blizzard became the running backs coach under new head coach Mason Miller. After averaging just 66.1 rushing yards in 2012, the 2013 McMurry rushing attack averaged 177.8 with 1,956 total yards.

Blizzard eventually moved to Belhaven University to become the offensive coordinator under Mumme. In his first year as OC, Blizzard's offense finished the season #10 in the nation in total offense and #2 in passing offense, recording 3,712 passing yards and averaging 337.5 yards per game. In the 2016 season, the Belhaven offense averaged nearly 500 yards per game, with the passing offense earning the #1 spot in the country for Division III football. His wide receivers also amassed 4,214 total yards, 370 receptions and 34 TDs during this season.

At the end of 2017, Blizzard's passing offense finished #4 in Division III football nationally, with his total offense achieving 445.3 yards per game, 38 touchdowns and 4,453 total yards. His offense also broke the school record for yards in a single game with 681.

In 2019, Blizzard joined the Memphis Express of the newly-formed Alliance of American Football as tight ends coach.

On May 30, 2019, Blizzard joined the Dallas Renegades of the XFL as a running backs coach. On March 9, 2020, Renegades head coach Bob Stoops added the title of assistant offensive coordinator to Blizzard.

== Personal life ==
Blizzard was raised in Hampton, by David Blizzard Sr. and Laverne Aikins. David, who was a college basketball player at Winston Salem State, was also a successful high school basketball coach at Hampton High School and Phoebus High School.

Blizzard has two brothers, David Jr. and Barrett, and two children.
