= Alex Haynes =

American football player (born 1982)

No. 24, 37
- Position: Running back

Personal information
- Born: February 13, 1982 (age 44); Orlando, Florida, U.S.
- Listed height: 5 ft 10 in (1.78 m)
- Listed weight: 230 lb (104 kg)

Career information
- High school: Maynard Evans (Orlando)
- College: UCF
- NFL draft: 2005: undrafted

Career history
- Baltimore Ravens (2005)*; Carolina Panthers (2005–2007); Cologne Centurions (2006); Baltimore Ravens (2008)*; Denver Broncos (2008); Florida Tuskers (2009)*
- * Offseason or practice squad member only

Career NFL statistics
- Rushing attempts: 3
- Rushing yards: 3
- Receptions: 3
- Receiving yards: 14
- Stats at Pro Football Reference

Alex Haynes (born February 13, 1982) is an American former professional football player who was a running back in the National Football League (NFL). He played college football for the UCF Knights and was signed by the Baltimore Ravens as an undrafted free agent in 2005.

Haynes also played for the Carolina Panthers, Denver Broncos and Florida Tuskers.

== Early life ==
Haynes attended Maynard Evans High School in Orlando, Florida and went on to play at the University of Central Florida from 2000 to 2004.

== Professional career ==
=== First stint with the Ravens ===
Haynes was signed as an undrafted free agent by the Baltimore Ravens in 2005.

=== Carolina Panthers ===
After playing in NFL Europe in 2006, Haynes was signed by the Carolina Panthers. He was released on September 2 and was signed to the practice squad on September 3. He was re-signed by the Panthers for the 2007 season, but was waived on September 7. He was later re-signed to the practice squad. The Panthers signed him from the practice squad on October 6. The Panthers tendered Haynes as an exclusive rights free agent and he was re-signed on February 26, 2008, to a one-year, $370,000 contract. He was released in late July.

=== Second stint with the Ravens ===
On August 1, 2008, Haynes signed with the Ravens. He was waived August 30.

=== Denver Broncos ===
On November 10, 2008, Haynes was signed by the Denver Broncos. He was released on November 22 and re-signed on December 22. He was later released again on February 11, 2009.

=== Florida Tuskers ===
Haynes was signed by the Florida Tuskers of the United Football League on September 9, 2009.
