= Rocky McIntosh =

American football player (born 1982)

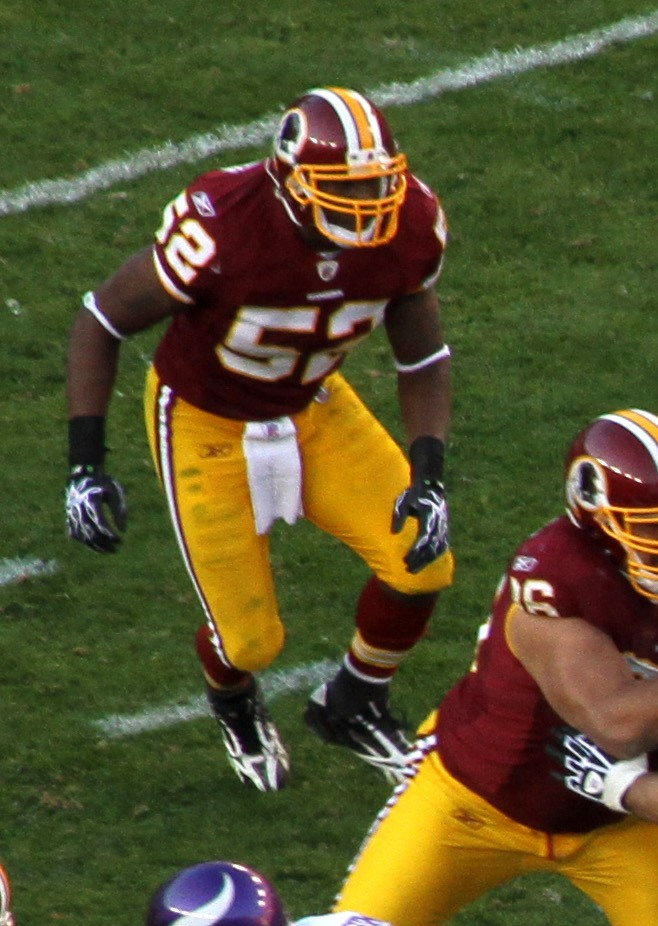
- McIntosh with the Washington Redskins in 2010

No. 52, 50
- Position: Linebacker

Personal information
- Born: November 15, 1982 (age 44); Gaffney, South Carolina, U.S.
- Listed height: 6 ft 2 in (1.88 m)
- Listed weight: 242 lb (110 kg)

Career information
- High school: Gaffney
- College: Miami (FL) (2001–2005)
- NFL draft: 2006: 2nd round, 35th overall pick

Career history
- Washington Redskins (2006–2011); St. Louis Rams (2012); Detroit Lions (2013)

Awards and highlights
- BCS national champion (2001)

Career NFL statistics
- Total tackles: 533
- Sacks: 9.0
- Forced fumbles: 8
- Pass deflections: 19
- Interceptions: 4
- Stats at Pro Football Reference

Roger A. "Rocky" McIntosh Jr. (born November 15, 1982) is an American former professional football player who was a linebacker in the National Football League (NFL). He played college football for the Miami Hurricanes and was selected in the second round of the 2006 NFL draft by the Washington Redskins.

== Early life ==
Roger "Rock" McIntosh grew up in a military family. Rock moved to Ft. Campbell, KY in the 8th grade. Him and another student were the only ones that played basketball for the high school freshman team while in the 8th grade. Rock was always very athletic and flourished in any sport he played. McIntosh went to Ft. Campbell High School and moved to Gaffney during the 10th grade. McIntosh attended and played high school football at Gaffney High School in Gaffney, South Carolina. During his senior season, he was rated the No. 15 linebacker in the nation and earned All-American honors by SuperPrep. He was named to the All-South Second Team and was listed as the No. 56 overall player in the South by BorderWars.com. After the season, McIntosh was named to the South Carolina Shrine Bowl team.

While in high school, McIntosh had a 3.0 grade-point average.

== College career ==
McIntosh committed to Clemson University after his junior season, but he re-opened his recruitment after the NCAA investigated whether a Clemson booster had given him and other teammates improper benefits. McIntosh eventually attended the University of Miami, after also receiving offers from the University of Tennessee and Florida State University. He played in 46 games (starting 26) for the Hurricanes and finished with 266 tackles and nine sacks.

McIntosh graduated with a degree in criminology.

Rocky later attended and obtained his MBA from George Washington University in Washington, D.C., while still playing in the NFL.

=== 2002 ===
After being redshirted in 2001, McIntosh started six games at strongside linebacker as a freshman. He played his first college game on August 31, 2002, in a win over Florida A&M University. On September 21, 2002, he started a college game for the first time and recorded four tackles (three solo) and two stops for losses in the win over Boston College. McIntosh had a season-high ten tackles (six solo) and a tackle for a loss in the win at the West Virginia University. On January 3, 2003, he played in the 2003 Fiesta Bowl (the 2002 BCS National Championship Game, as part of the Bowl Championship Series) and recorded eight tackles (two solo), including two for losses. The Hurricanes lost to the Ohio State Buckeyes 31–24 in double overtime. In his first season, McIntosh recorded 43 tackles (24 solo), eight tackles for a loss, one forced fumble and two pass break ups.

=== 2003 ===
During his sophomore season, McIntosh was limited by a knee injury that slowed him throughout preseason practices. He underwent arthroscopic surgery and missed the first game against Louisiana Tech. On November 15, 2003, he made a season-high eight tackles (five solo) in the win over Syracuse University. On January 1, 2004, he played in the 2004 Orange Bowl, where the Hurricanes won over the Florida State Seminoles. McIntosh played in 12 games and made 23 tackles (16 solo), including one for a loss of three yards and one pass break up.

=== 2004 ===
As a junior in 2004, McIntosh played in ten games and started nine games at both strongside (six) and middle linebacker (three). In the season opener against Florida State University, he recorded 11 tackles, including a half sack and two quarterback pressures. On September 23, 2004, he had a career-high 17 tackles, including two tackles for loss, one quarterback pressure and two pass breakups in a win over the University of Houston. McIntosh did not play against Wake Forest University due to a shoulder injury and played a limited role in the loss to Virginia Tech the following week. In that game, he recorded eight tackles, three tackles for loss and one sack. His shoulder injury returned and he did not play in the 2004 Peach Bowl, where the Hurricanes beat the Florida Gators.

He ranked second on the team with 111 tackles (37 solo), including 13 tackles for a loss, eight quarterback pressures, four sacks, one forced fumble and three pass breakups. For his efforts, he was voted honorable mention All-ACC and was selected as the Hurricanes Linebacker of the Year.

=== 2005 ===
During his senior season, McIntosh started 11 games and led the Hurricanes in tackles with 89 (50 solo), and had 5.5 sacks and ten tackles for a loss. After the season, he earned All-ACC honorable mention as a senior.

== Professional career ==
Pre-draft measurables
Height	Weight	Arm length	Hand span	40-yard dash	10-yard split	20-yard split	20-yard shuttle	Three-cone drill	Vertical jump	Broad jump	Bench press
6 ft 2 1/8 in (1.88 m)	237 lb (108 kg)	32 1/2 in (0.83 m)	9 1/4 in (0.23 m)	4.63 s	1.62 s	2.74 s	4.20 s	7.32 s	41.5 in (1.05 m)	9 ft 11 in (3.02 m)	18 reps
All values from NFL Combine/Pro Day

=== Washington Redskins ===
==== 2006 season ====
McIntosh was selected in the second round (35th overall) of the 2006 NFL draft by the Washington Redskins. The Redskins traded a sixth round pick in 2006 and a second round pick in the 2007 NFL draft to the New York Jets in order to swap second-round picks. He had minor knee surgery on June 14, 2006, and was signed to the Redskins on July 30, 2006.

In 2006, McIntosh played in 16 regular-season games with two starts and totaled 23 tackles (17 solo) and 25 special teams tackles. His first professional start was on December 24, 2006, in a 37–31 overtime loss to the St. Louis Rams. In both of his two starts, McIntosh recorded double digit tackles.

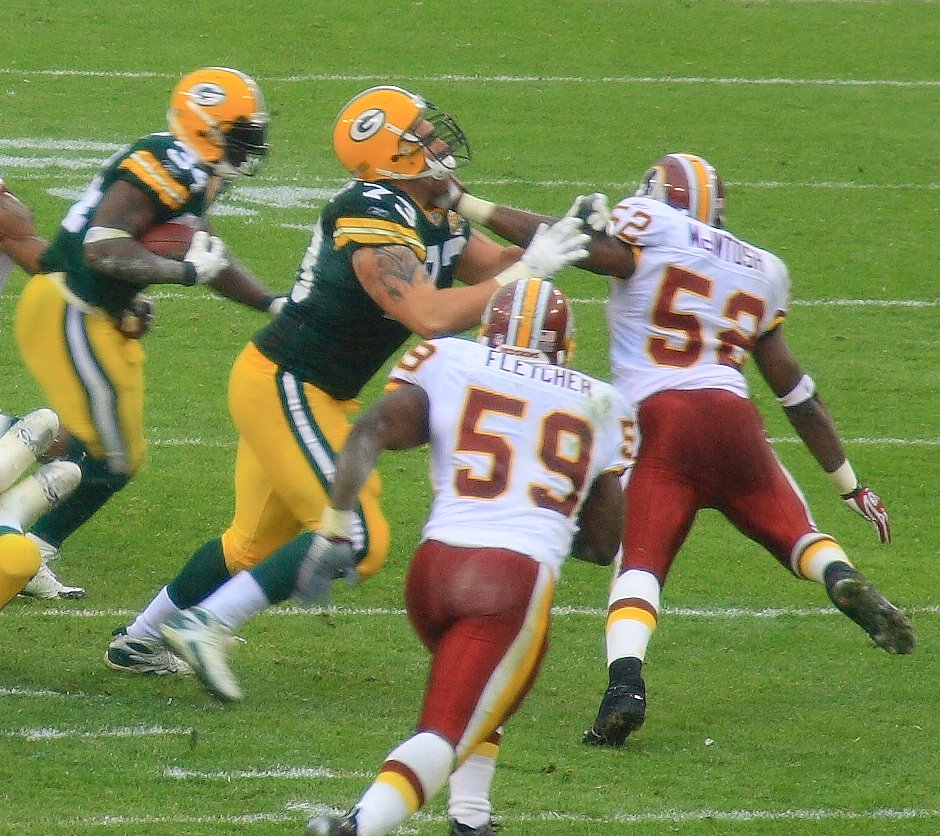
McIntosh (#52) pursuing Green Bay Packers running back, Vernand Morency.

==== 2007 season ====
In 2007, McIntosh set career highs in games played (14), started (13), tackles (105), solo tackles (70), sacks (3), forced fumbles (3) and fumble recoveries (1). He recorded his first quarterback sack on Trent Green in a 16–13 overtime win against the Miami Dolphins on September 9, 2007. On December 16, 2007, McIntosh tore both the ACL and MCL ligaments in a 22–10 victory over the New York Giants after bending his knee awkwardly in a pile in the first quarter. He was placed on injured reserve on December 19, 2007. McIntosh was recognized as the Redskins’ nominee for the NFL's Walter Payton Man of the Year Award. The award recognizes a player for community service activities as well as excellence on the field.

==== 2008 season ====
After being put on injury reserve the previous season, McIntosh set career highs in games played (16) and games started (15). He recorded 87 tackles, two sacks, an interception and two forced fumbles. On September 21, 2008, he made a season-high 12 tackles, one forced fumble and a half-sack in a win over the Arizona Cardinals. McIntosh had his first career interception on November 16, 2008, in a loss against the Dallas Cowboys. In that game, he also recorded eight tackles and two pass breakups.

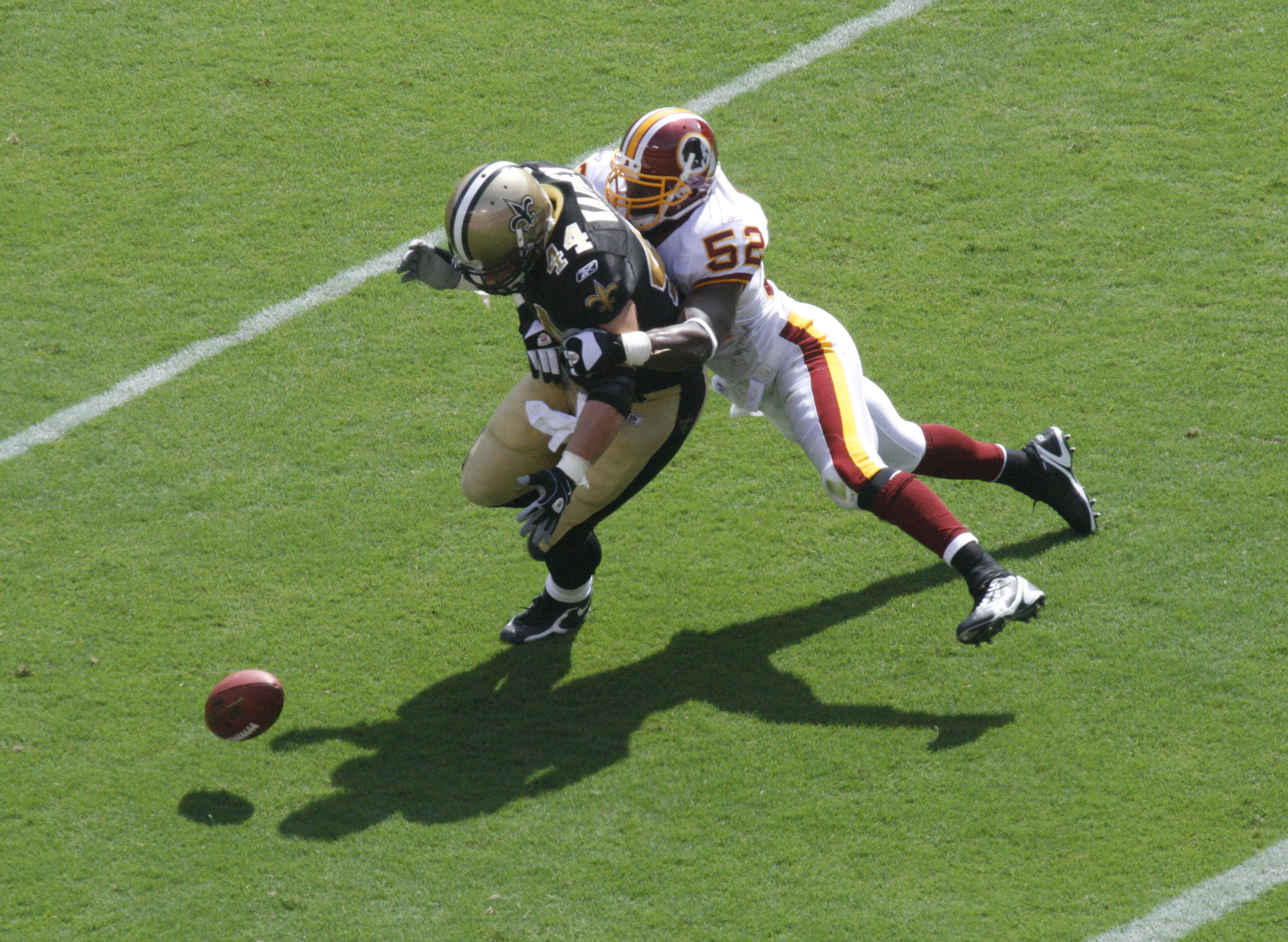
McIntosh tackling Mike Karney while playing against the Saints in the 2008 season.

==== 2009 season ====
In 2009, McIntosh played in 16 regular season games with 15 starts and finished the season with 94 tackles (64 solo), two interceptions and two forced fumbles. He recorded seven tackles (two solo) and his first interception of the season (second of his career) in a loss against the Atlanta Falcons on November 8, 2009.

==== 2010 season ====
When the Redskins switched to a 3-4 defense, McIntosh was converted from an outside linebacker to the right inside linebacker alongside London Fletcher, who was the left inside linebacker. He started fifteen games during the 2010 season and recorded a new career high of 110 tackles as well as two sacks.

==== 2011 season ====
On August 4, 2011, McIntosh re-signed with the Redskins for one year. McIntosh started eight games and recorded 65 combined tackles, one sack, and one pass breakup.

=== St. Louis Rams ===
McIntosh signed with the St. Louis Rams on June 14, 2012. For the Rams' 4-3 defense, he returned to being an outside linebacker as he was before the Redskins' switched to a 3-4 defense. Rocky earned a starting spot and finished the season with 44 tackles,1 sack, and 1 interception.

=== Detroit Lions ===
McIntosh signed a one-year deal with the Detroit Lions on August 17, 2013. Though he made the 53-man roster after final roster cuts before the start of the 2013 season, he was waived by the Lions after they claimed safety DeJon Gomes off waivers on September 2. He resigned with the team three days later.

=== NFL statistics ===
Year	Team	GP	COMB	TOTAL	AST	SACK	FF	FR	FR YDS	INT	IR YDS	AVG IR	LNG	TD	PD
2006	WSH	16	28	25	3	0.0	0	0	0	0	0	0	0	0	0
2007	WSH	14	87	68	19	3.0	3	1	0	0	-4	0	-4	0	5
2008	WSH	16	87	60	27	2.0	2	0	0	1	4	4	4	0	5
2009	WSH	16	94	64	30	0.0	2	0	0	2	27	14	18	0	4
2010	WSH	15	110	73	37	2.0	1	0	0	0	0	0	0	0	3
2011	WSH	15	65	38	27	1.0	0	0	0	0	0	0	0	0	1
2012	STL	16	44	33	11	1.0	0	0	0	1	34	34	34	0	1
2013	DET	16	15	9	6	0.0	0	0	0	0	0	0	0	0	0
Career		124	530	370	160	9.0	8	1	0	4	61	15	34	0	19

== Coaching career ==
In 2014, McIntosh became a football coach at Flint Hill High School in Oakton, Virginia. He is also the Upper School Admission Interviewer and Outreach Assistant.

== Personal life ==
McIntosh is the son of Roger McIntosh Sr. and Darcia McIntosh. He has two younger brothers, John and Arthur. He and his wife, Alessia, have two sons, Gavin and Landon McIntosh, and two daughters, Natalie and Camelia McIntosh. Natalie is excellent at tennis. They were married on a beach three days before the 2006 NFL draft after meeting on his first day of school at the University of Miami.
