= Darrell Wright =

American gridiron football player (born 1979)

No. 8
- Position: Defensive end

Personal information
- Born: December 30, 1979 (age 46); Fort Pierce, Florida, U.S.
- Listed height: 6 ft 4 in (1.93 m)
- Listed weight: 285 lb (129 kg)

Career information
- High school: Port St. Lucie (FL)
- College: Oregon
- NFL draft: 2003: undrafted

Career history
- Dallas Cowboys (2003)*; Washington Redskins (2004)*; → Amsterdam Admirals (2004); Montreal Alouettes (2005); Seattle Seahawks (2006)*; Houston Texans (2006)*; → Cologne Centurions (2006); Orlando Predators (2007); South Valley Vandals (2015)
- * Offseason or practice squad member only

Career AFL statistics
- Tackles: 5
- Sacks: 1.5
- Stats at ArenaFan.com

Darrell Wright (born December 30, 1979) is an American former football defensive lineman. He played for South Valley Vandals in the NNFL.

Wright played college football for the University of Oregon. In 2006, he attended training camp with the Houston Texans of the National Football League and played in NFL Europa for the Cologne Centurions.
