= Dave Pearson (American football) =

American football player (born 1981)

No. 60
- Position: Center

Personal information
- Born: March 29, 1981 (age 45); Brighton, Michigan, U.S.
- Listed height: 6 ft 3 in (1.91 m)
- Listed weight: 287 lb (130 kg)

Career information
- High school: Brighton
- College: Michigan
- NFL draft: 2004: undrafted

Career history
- Detroit Lions (2004)*; Atlanta Falcons (2004–2005)*; Detroit Lions (2005–2006); → Cologne Centurions (2006); St. Louis Rams (2007)*
- * Offseason or practice squad member only

Awards and highlights
- Second-team All-Big Ten (2003)

Career NFL statistics
- Games played: 2
- Stats at Pro Football Reference

David John Pearson (born March 29, 1981) is an American former professional football player who was a center in the National Football League (NFL). He played college football for the Michigan Wolverines.

== Early life and college career ==
Pearson grew up in Brighton, Michigan and graduated from Brighton High School in 1999. At Brighton High, Pearson played football and basketball with future college teammate Drew Henson and was an honorable USA Today All-American.

At the University of Michigan, Pearson redshirted the 1999 season on the Michigan Wolverines football team. In 2000 and 2001, Pearson played as a reserve defensive tackle. He moved to the offensive line afterwards and was the starting center in 2002 and 2003. Pearson made the All-Big Ten second-team as a senior in 2003. He was also part of two Big Ten championship teams in 2000 and 2003.

== Professional career ==
Pearson first signed with the Detroit Lions as an undrafted free agent on April 30, 2004. He was released after training camp and signed with the Atlanta Falcons practice squad on October 20. The Falcons released Pearson after the 2005 preseason.

On December 1, 2005, the Lions signed Pearson to the practice squad. A week after signing him to the active roster, the Lions allocated Pearson to the Cologne Centurions of NFL Europe on January 9, 2006. Pearson started four games for the Centurions and appeared in the final two games of the 2006 season for the Lions.

Pearson signed with the St. Louis Rams on July 31, 2007. After an injury during the preseason, Pearson was released August 28.

== Post-football career ==
After retiring from football, Pearson moved to New York City and became a senior vice president at The Related Companies, a real estate firm founded by fellow Michigan alum Stephen M. Ross.
