= Kili Lefotu =

American football player (born 1983)

No. 66, 67
- Position: Guard

Personal information
- Born: November 23, 1983 (age 42); Honolulu, Hawaii, U.S.
- Listed height: 6 ft 4 in (1.93 m)
- Listed weight: 315 lb (143 kg)

Career information
- High school: Arlington (Riverside, California)
- College: Arizona
- NFL draft: 2006: 7th round, 230th overall pick

Career history
- Washington Redskins (2006–2007)*; → Cologne Centurions (2007)
- * Offseason or practice squad member only

Kiliona Lefotu (born November 23, 1983) is an American former professional football player who was a guard in the National Football League (NFL). He played college football for the Arizona Wildcats. He was selected by the Washington Redskins in the seventh round of the 2006 NFL draft.

== Early life and college ==
Born in Honolulu to Samoan American parents, Lefotu attended Arlington High School in Riverside, California. At the University of Arizona, Lefotu played for four years at offensive line on the Arizona Wildcats football team, starting at right guard from 2003 to 2005.

== Professional career ==
The Washington Redskins selected Lefotu in the seventh round of the 2006 NFL draft with the 230th overall pick. During his rookie preseason, Lefotu was hospitalized after being found unconscious in his hotel room in the evening of August 9, 2006. Following the preseason, the Redskins released Lefotu.

In January 2007, the Redskins re-signed Lefotu and allocated him to the Cologne Centurions of NFL Europa. Lefotu started 10 games in what would be the final season of NFL Europa.

Following an arrest for assault and destruction of property, Lefotu was cut by the Redskins in October 2007. He never played any regular season games in the NFL.
