= Antwaun Carter =

American football player (born 1981)

Profile
- Position: Running back

Personal information
- Born: September 9, 1981 (age 45); Aiken, South Carolina
- Listed height: 5 ft 7 in (1.70 m)
- Listed weight: 215 lb (98 kg)

Career information
- High school: South Aiken (SC)
- College: Boise State
- NFL draft: 2006: undrafted

Career history
- Cologne Centurions (2007); Team Alabama (2008)

Antwaun Carter (born September 9, 1981) is an American former football running back.

== High school ==
Carter played at South Aiken High School, where, in addition to football, was a track star, winning the state 100-meter title in 2001. The same year he won the state title in the shot put. The football team had lost 29 consecutive games going into his senior season, which Carter finished with 1,856 yards, before finally breaking a 42–14 win against Midland Valley High School behind Carter's 200-plus rushing yards

== College career ==
After limited scholarship offers coming out of high school, he enrolled at Sacramento City College, eventually drawing attention from Boise State University head coach Dan Hawkins, and transferred to join Boise State's 'tailback by committee' approach as a short yardage and goal line back.

Carter's playing career at Boise State University began his junior season of 2004, posting 278 yards on 75 rushes and 7 touchdowns. He returned his senior season to record 100 rushes for 440 yards and 10 touchdowns. His only catch came in 2004 for a 9-yard gain.

According to one interview, Carter entered into his senior season believing he'd be seeing time primarily as the goal line back, but as the season continued, he was involved in heavy rotation with the other backs. He finished with 10 touchdowns on 100 carries for 840 yards.

== Professional career ==
Drafted in 20th round of the NFL Europa Free Agent Draft in 2007 by the Cologne Centurions, where he finished the season with 2 rushes for 6 yards and 2 catches for 9 yards. He had finished training camp as the starting tailback, having beat out eventual NFLE MVP Derrick Ross and AJ Harris, but suffered a knee injury early in the first regular season game.

Carter was selected in the 4th round, 43rd overall, by Team Alabama in the inaugural All American Football League draft. After the league suspended operations he was invited the Kansas City Chiefs camp in May 2008 where he made the practice squad. He was released in 2010.
