= David Duggan (American football) =

American football player and coach (born 1963)

Current position
- Title: Head coach
- Team: Jackson Academy (MS)

Biographical details
- Born: July 16, 1963 (age 63); Concord, Massachusetts
- Education: New Hampshire

Playing career
- 1982–1986: New Hampshire
- Position: Linebacker

Coaching career (HC unless noted)
- 1987: Allegheny College (ILB)
- 1988–1991: New Hampshire (ILB)
- 1992–1994: Holy Cross (ILB)
- 1995-1997: Colgate (LB)
- 1998–2000: Brown (DC/LB)
- 2001–2003: Berlin Thunder (DC/LB)
- 2004–2005: Cologne Centurions (DC/LB)
- 2006–2007: Cologne Centurions
- 2008–2010: Southern Miss (LB)
- 2011: Southern Miss (Co-DC/LB)
- 2012: North Carolina (OLB/ST)
- 2013–2015: Southern Miss (DC/LB)
- 2016–2018: Western Michigan (LB)
- 2019–2020: Arkansas State (DC)
- 2023: Kent State (DC/LB)
- 2024–present: Jackson Academy (MS)

Administrative career (AD unless noted)
- 2021–2022: Troy (director of recruiting)

Head coaching record
- Overall: 10–9 (NFL Europe)

David Duggan (born July 16, 1963) is an American football coach and former player. He is the head football coach for Jackson Academy, a position he has held since 2024. He previously served as the director of recruiting at Troy University. Duggan served as the head coach for the Cologne Centurions of NFL Europe from 2006 to 2007, where he compiled a record of 10–9.

== Early life ==
A native of Maynard, Massachusetts, Duggan played four years of football at the University of New Hampshire. He served as captain in 1986 while playing linebacker for the Wildcats.

== Coaching career ==
Duggan began his coaching career in 1987 at Allegheny College where he worked with the inside linebackers. During his one year stay with the Gators, they won the North Coast Athletic Conference title and participated in the NCAA Division III playoffs. In 1988, he returned to his alma mater for a four-year stint as linebackers coach with the Wildcats. In his final year at UNH, the Wildcats won the Yankee Conference title and participated in the NCAA Division I-AA playoffs.

After the 2011 season, Duggan followed head coach Larry Fedora to the University of North Carolina, where he was named outside linebackers coach and special teams coordinator on January 3, 2012. He spent one season in that capacity before returning to Southern Miss as the defensive coordinator and linebackers coach under newly hired head coach Todd Monken in January 2013.

On August 19, 2019, Duggan was named acting head coach of Arkansas State following head coach Blake Anderson's decision to take a leave of absence. Duggan had been named defensive coordinator of the team earlier in the year.

Duggan was fired on October 16, 2020, less than 24 hours after the Red Wolves defense gave up 52 points against Georgia State.

Duggan was named the director of recruiting at Troy on March 31, 2021.

In late December 2022, Duggan was named the defensive coordinator at Kent State under brand-new head coach Kenni Burns. On April 4, 2024, Duggan stepped down from his positions as defensive coordinator and linebackers coach to become the head football coach for Jackson Academy to be closer to family.

== Personal life ==
Duggan and his wife, Lynne, have two daughters, Olivia and Grace. He graduated from the University of New Hampshire in 1986 with a degree in physical education.

== Head coaching record ==
Team	Year	Regular season					Postseason			
Team	Year	Won	Lost	Ties	Win %	Finish	Won	Lost	Win %	Result
COL	2006	4	6	0	.400	4th (League)	–	–	—	—
COL	2007	6	3	0	.600	3rd (League)	–	–	—	—
Total		10	9	0	.526		–	–	—	
