= Werner Hippler =

German gridiron football player (born 1970)

Werner Hippler (born July 30, 1970, in Cologne) is a former American football tight end from Germany. He played for the Cologne Centurions, but the majority of his career has been with the Frankfurt Galaxy. Hippler is the leader with the most games played in NFL Europa history.

Hippler, who played football at Burnaby, British Columbia High School in Canada before moving with his father to California. He played in College at Sacramento State for the Division I-AA Hornets in the backfield with future 12-year CFL RB Troy Mills and future Arena Football League star QB Aaron Garcia. Hippler signed with the San Diego Chargers and spent two years on their practice squad. He later went a full camp with the Detroit Lions and played one year in the short-lived XFL for the Las Vegas Outlaws. Through 2007 he had played 14 season of Pro Football.

Hippler has small roles in two very popular European movies of the popular genre: Der Clown and Straight Shooter, opposite Dennis Hopper. He runs a security company in Germany called 'Rhein Security' with his football agent and trained for three months in Israel with the ISS. He is married to Kirshen and they have one son named Dennis (born December 12, 1997).

On November 21, 2017, Hippler replaced team founder Martin Sieg on the board of the German Football League's Hamburg Huskies in order for Sieg to focus on the team's marketing and sponsorship.
