= John Lyons (American football coach) =

American football player and coach (born 1952)

Biographical details
- Born: March 10, 1952 (age 74); West Hartford, Connecticut, U.S.

Playing career
- 1972–1974: Penn
- Position: Defensive back

Coaching career (HC unless noted)
- 1974–1984: Penn (DC)
- 1985–1987: Boston University (DC)
- 1988–1991: Dartmouth (DC)
- 1992–2004: Dartmouth
- 2005: Cologne Centurions (DB)
- 2006–2007: Cologne Centurions (DC/DB)
- 2007: Cologne Centurions (interim HC)
- 2011–2021: New Hampshire (DC/DB)

Head coaching record
- Overall: 60–68–1 (college); 0–1 (NFL Europe)

Accomplishments and honors

Championships
- 2 Ivy (1992, 1996)

John Lyons (born March 10, 1952) is a former American football head coach best known for his 13 years as head coach of Dartmouth College.

Lyons was an all-Ivy defensive back while playing for the University of Pennsylvania. After graduating in 1974 he worked as an assistant at Penn for the next 11 seasons, eventually riding up to become defensive coordinator. In 1988, he was brought to Dartmouth by then-coach Buddy Teevens. When Teevens moved on, Lyons was promoted to head coach in 1992.

During his time as head coach, Lyons was successful during his first six seasons, winning two Ivy League titles and posting five winning seasons. The 1996 team won every game it played for a 10–0 record (with seven Ivy League games), becoming the first undefeated Dartmouth team since 1970. The ten wins also set a new record for most wins in a season (as with all Ivy League schools, they do not play bowl games). As of 2026, it remains the last unbeaten Dartmouth team. He also coached future NFL quarterback Jay Fiedler. However, the program tailed off after 1997 and the school would finish in last place four times in the next seven years. His later years saw increasing criticism from fans and the local media as his decision-making was called into question. He was dismissed by the school after the 2004 season.

After being fired by Dartmouth he coached in NFL Europe for the Cologne Centurions. He held the position from 2005 to 2007 and concurrently coached at Kimball Union Academy; he also was the school's athletic director, starting in 2008, and stayed in both jobs through 2010. In January 2011, he joined the University of New Hampshire's football program as its defensive coordinator and retired in 2021.

== Head coaching record ==
=== College ===
Year	Team	Overall	Conference	Standing	Bowl/playoffs
Dartmouth Big Green (Ivy League) (1992–2004)
1992	Dartmouth	8–2	6–1	T–1st	
1993	Dartmouth	7–3	6–1	2nd	
1994	Dartmouth	4–6	2–5	T–7th	
1995	Dartmouth	7–2–1	4–2–1	4th	
1996	Dartmouth	10–0	7–0	1st	
1997	Dartmouth	8–2	6–1	2nd	
1998	Dartmouth	2–8	1–6	T–7th	
1999	Dartmouth	2–8	2–5	6th	
2000	Dartmouth	2–8	1–6	T–7th	
2001	Dartmouth	1–8	1–6	T–7th	
2002	Dartmouth	3–7	2–5	T–6th	
2003	Dartmouth	5–5	4–3	T–2nd	
2004	Dartmouth	1–9	1–6	T–7th	
Dartmouth:		60–68–1	43–47–1		
Total:		60–68–1			
National championship Conference title Conference division title or championship game berth
