= Philippe Gardent (rugby league) =

French rugby league footballer and player of American football

Phillipe Gardent
Personal information
- Born: 24 March 1979 (age 47)

Playing information
Club
Years	Team	Pld	T	G	FG	P
2008	Celtic Crusaders	6	0	0	0	0

Philippe Gardent (French pronunciation: [filip ɡaʁdɑ̃]; born 24 March 1979) is a former American footballer and rugby league footballer.

He played for Celtic Crusaders in National League One after failing to make the regular season roster of the National Football League's Carolina Panthers.

The son of a ski instructor, Gardent began to play American football in his hometown of Grenoble at the age of 17. A linebacker, he spent time on the practice squad of the Washington Redskins in the NFL and played for the Cologne Centurions of NFL Europa (NFLE) from 2005 to 2007. He was named the 2006 NFLE Defensive Player of the Year after leading the league with 70 tackles. He also played for the Berlin Thunder in 2003 and 2004.
