= Cologne Centurions (NFL Europe) =

Professional American football team in Germany

Logo

General information
- Founded: 2004
- Folded: 2007
- Stadium: RheinEnergieStadion
- Headquartered: Cologne, Germany
- Colors: Red, Black, White, Silver

League / conference affiliations
- NFL Europe

The Cologne Centurions were an American football team that played in NFL Europe. The Centurions began competing in the league in the 2004 season, having replaced the defunct Barcelona Dragons. They played their home games at RheinEnergieStadion in Cologne.

The Centurions' first-ever game was against local rival Rhein Fire. Cologne lost 25–26. The Centurions' inaugural season finished with a 4–6 record.

On 21 February 2006, the Centurions named David Duggan as their new head coach. He replaced Darryl Sims, who was on the verge of his first season in the position but instead was pursuing an opportunity in the NFL. Peter Vaas, a two-time World Bowl-winning coach with the Berlin Thunder, had occupied the job in the team's first two seasons. The Centurions were the only NFL Europe team who never win a World Bowl.

An unrelated team of the same name is to play in the inaugural 2021 season of the new European League of Football

== Season-by-season ==
Season	League	Regular season					Postseason			
Season	League	Won	Lost	Ties	Win %	Finish	Won	Lost	Win %	Result
2004	NFLE	4	6	0	.400	4th (League)	–	–	—	Out of playoffs.
2005	NFLE	6	4	0	.600	3rd (League)	–	–	—	Out of playoffs.
2006	NFLE	4	6	0	.400	4th (League)	–	–	—	Out of playoffs.
2007	NFLE	6	4	0	.600	3rd (League)	–	–	—	Out of playoffs.
Total		20	20	0	.500		–	–	—	

== Head coaches ==
#	Name	Term	Regular season					Postseason				Achievements
#	Name	Term	GC	Won	Lost	Ties	Win %	GC	Won	Lost	Win %	Achievements
1	Peter Vaas	2004–2005	20	10	10	0	.500	–	–	–	—	—
2	David Duggan	2006–2007	19	10	9	0	.526	–	–	–	—	—
3	John Lyons	2007	1	0	1	0	.000	–	–	–	—	—
