= 2004 Cologne Centurions season =

NFL Europe team season

- General manager: Jacques Orthen
- Head coach: Peter Vaas
- Home stadium: RheinEnergieStadion

Results
- Record: 4–6
- Division place: 4th
- Playoffs: did not qualify

The 2004 Cologne Centurions season was the inaugural season for the franchise in the NFL Europe League (NFLEL). The team was led by head coach Peter Vaas and played its home games at RheinEnergieStadion in Cologne, Germany. They finished the regular season in fourth place with a record of four wins and six losses.

The Centurions replaced the Barcelona Dragons for this season, keeping only two members from Barcelona's 2003 roster: linebacker Cedric Cotar and receiver Marco Martos.

== Offseason ==
=== Free agent draft ===
2004 Cologne Centurions NFLEL free agent draft selections
Draft order		Player name	Position	College
Round	Choice	Player name	Position	College
1	3	Demetric Evans	DE	Georgia
2	9	Will Hunter	CB	Syracuse
3	16	Richard Newsome	S	Michigan State
4	21	Byron Hardmon	LB	Florida
5	28	Robert Doane	T	Texas
6	33	Marcus Smith	DB	Memphis
7	40	Erik Totten	S	Western Washington
8	45	Rodnick Phillips	RB	Southern Methodist
9	52	Andre Arnold	DE	Grambling
10	57	Lance Gibson	DE	Central Washington
11	64	Curt McGill	C	Georgia
12	69	Chris Smith	T	UC Davis
13	76	Antwon McCray	RB	Toledo

== Personnel ==
=== Staff ===
2004 Cologne Centurions staff
Front office: General manager – Jacques Orthen; Head coaches: Head coach/quarterbacks – Peter Vaas; Offensive coaches: Offensive coordinator/offensive line – Bob Bicknell; National coach/running backs – Wanja Müller; Wide receivers – Dwaune Jones; Tight ends – Tom Nütten	Defensive coaches: Defensive coordinator/linebackers – David Duggan; Defensive line – Mel Mills; Defensive backs – Richard Kent; Defensive assistant – Robert Harris; Strength and conditioning: Strength and conditioning – Joe Shufelt

=== Roster ===
2004 Cologne Centurions final roster
Quarterbacks: 7 Rob Adamson; 12 Ryan Van Dyke; Running backs: 23 Jeremy Allen; 36 Chad Brinker; 8 Avon Cobourne; 28 Antwon McCray; Wide receivers: 83 Todd Devoe; 82 Sean Dillard; 87 Albert Johnson; 19 Carl Morris; 80 Ben Nelson; 81 Reggie Newhouse; Tight ends: 89 Mark Inkrott	Offensive linemen: 53 Luke Butkus C; 65 Mike Mabry C; 63 David Miller G; 72 Lance Nimmo T; 79 Tony Pashos T; 68 Elliot Silvers G/T; 69 Zach Wilson G; Defensive linemen: 95 Andre Arnold DE; 96 Ryan Atoe DT; 91 Felipe Claybrooks DE; 92 Demetric Evans DE/DT; 77 Cullen Jenkins DT; 93 Eric Powell DE; 99 Ron Smith DT (IR); 98 Jake Sprague DE (IR)	Linebackers: 55 Bobby Brooks MLB; 40 Byron Hardmon OLB/MLB; 44 LaMarcus McDonald OLB; 52 Marcus Reese OLB; Defensive backs: 30 Jerton Evans S; 33 Marcus Floyd CB; 25 Cedric Henry CB; 27 Will Hunter CB; 24 Don McGee CB; 21 Richard Newsome S; 22 Steve Smith S; 26 Erwin Swiney CB; 29 Erik Totten S; Special teams: 9 Steve Cheek P; 10 Derek Schorejs K	National players: 56 (France) Cedric Cotar OLB; 86 (Germany) Werner Hippler TE; 14 (Sweden) Ola Kimrin K; 1 (Mexico) Marco Martos WR; 11 (Japan) Yu Nakajima WR; 5 (Japan) Kentaro Namiki QB; 16 (Japan) Michihiro Ogawa WR; 20 (Japan) Tadani Sano CB/S; 45 (Japan) Masaki Tokimoto OLB; Rookies in italics

== Schedule ==
Week	Date	Kickoff (Note: All times local to where the game was played.)	Opponent	Results		Game site	Attendance
Week	Date	Kickoff	Opponent	Final score	Team record	Game site	Attendance
1	Sunday, April 4	4:00 p.m.	at Rhein Fire	L 25–26	0–1	Arena AufSchalke	22,736
2	Saturday, April 10	7:00 p.m.	Frankfurt Galaxy	L 10–20	0–2	RheinEnergieStadion	9,134
3	Sunday, April 18	4:00 p.m.	at Berlin Thunder	L 31–35	0–3	Olympic Stadium	12,036
4	Saturday, April 24	7:00 p.m.	Scottish Claymores	W 17–3	1–3	RheinEnergieStadion	8,761
5	Saturday, May 1	7:00 p.m.	at Frankfurt Galaxy	L 17–24	1–4	Waldstadion	24,117
6	Saturday, May 8	7:00 p.m.	Berlin Thunder	W 28–27	2–4	RheinEnergieStadion	10,164
7	Saturday, May 15	7:00 p.m.	at Amsterdam Admirals	L 10–17	2–5	Amsterdam ArenA	14,437
8	Sunday, May 23	4:00 p.m.	Rhein Fire	W 7–6	3–5	RheinEnergieStadion	20,354
9	Sunday, May 30	4:00 p.m.	Amsterdam Admirals	L 18–23	3–6	RheinEnergieStadion	9,056
10	Saturday, June 5	2:00 p.m.	at Scottish Claymores	W 28–20	4–6	Hampden Park	10,013

== Standings ==
NFL Europe League
Team	W	L	T	PCT	PF	PA	Home	Road	STK
Berlin Thunder	9	1	0	.900	289	195	5–0	4–1	W4
Frankfurt Galaxy	7	3	0	.700	212	192	4–1	3–2	L1
Amsterdam Admirals	5	5	0	.500	173	191	3–2	2–3	W2
Cologne Centurions	4	6	0	.400	191	201	3–2	1–4	W1
Rhein Fire	3	7	0	.300	161	178	3–2	0–5	L4
Scottish Claymores	2	8	0	.200	128	197	1–4	1–4	L2

== Game summaries ==
=== Week 1: at Rhein Fire ===
Week One: Cologne Centurions at Rhein Fire – Game summary

Quarter	1	2	3	4	Total
Cologne	10	6	3	6	25
Rhein	14	3	7	2	26

at Arena AufSchalke, Gelsenkirchen, Germany

- Date: Sunday, April 4
- Game time: 4:08 p.m. CEST
- Game attendance: 22,736
- Referee: Carl Cheffers

=== Week 2: vs Frankfurt Galaxy ===
Week Two: Frankfurt Galaxy at Cologne Centurions – Game summary

Quarter	1	2	3	4	Total
Frankfurt	7	0	0	13	20
Cologne	3	0	0	7	10

at RheinEnergieStadion, Cologne, Germany

- Date: Saturday, April 10
- Game time: 7:04 p.m. CEST
- Game attendance: 9,134
- Referee: Gerald Austin

=== Week 3: at Berlin Thunder ===
Week Three: Cologne Centurions at Berlin Thunder – Game summary

Quarter	1	2	3	4	Total
Cologne	7	14	3	7	31
Berlin	21	7	7	0	35

at Olympic Stadium, Berlin, Germany

- Date: Sunday, April 18
- Game time: 4:06 p.m. CEST
- Game attendance: 12,036
- Referee: Bill Vinovich

=== Week 4: vs Scottish Claymores ===
Week Four: Scottish Claymores at Cologne Centurions – Game summary

Quarter	1	2	3	4	Total
Scotland	3	0	0	0	3
Cologne	7	10	0	0	17

at RheinEnergieStadion, Cologne, Germany

- Date: Saturday, April 24
- Game time: 7:06 p.m. CEST
- Game attendance: 8,761
- Referee: Walt Anderson

=== Week 5: at Frankfurt Galaxy ===
Week Five: Cologne Centurions at Frankfurt Galaxy – Game summary

Quarter	1	2	3	4	Total
Cologne	3	0	7	7	17
Frankfurt	3	14	0	7	24

at Waldstadion, Frankfurt, Germany

- Date: Saturday, May 1
- Game time: 7:08 p.m. CEST
- Game attendance: 24,117
- Referee: Ed Hochuli

=== Week 6: vs Berlin Thunder ===
Week Six: Berlin Thunder at Cologne Centurions – Game summary

Quarter	1	2	3	4	Total
Berlin	7	7	0	13	27
Cologne	14	0	7	7	28

at RheinEnergieStadion, Cologne, Germany

- Date: Saturday, May 8
- Game time: 7:04 p.m. CEST
- Game attendance: 10,164
- Referee: John Parry

=== Week 7: at Amsterdam Admirals ===
Week Seven: Cologne Centurions at Amsterdam Admirals – Game summary

Quarter	1	2	3	4	Total
Cologne	0	3	7	0	10
Amsterdam	7	7	3	0	17

at Amsterdam ArenA, Amsterdam, Netherlands

- Date: Saturday, May 15
- Game time: 7:08 p.m. CEST
- Game attendance: 14,437
- Referee: Gerald Austin

=== Week 8: vs Rhein Fire ===
Week Eight: Rhein Fire at Cologne Centurions – Game summary

Quarter	1	2	3	4	Total
Rhein	0	6	0	0	6
Cologne	0	0	7	0	7

at RheinEnergieStadion, Cologne, Germany

- Date: Sunday, May 23
- Game time: 4:07 p.m. CEST
- Game attendance: 20,354
- Referee: Gene Steratore

=== Week 9: vs Amsterdam Admirals ===
Week Nine: Amsterdam Admirals at Cologne Centurions – Game summary

Quarter	1	2	3	4	Total
Amsterdam	7	7	3	6	23
Cologne	4	0	7	7	18

at RheinEnergieStadion, Cologne, Germany

- Date: Sunday, May 30
- Game time: 4:06 p.m. CEST
- Game attendance: 9,056
- Referee: Bill Vinovich

=== Week 10: at Scottish Claymores ===
Week Ten: Cologne Centurions at Scottish Claymores – Game summary

Quarter	1	2	3	4	Total
Cologne	0	14	0	14	28
Scotland	0	7	13	0	20

at Hampden Park, Glasgow, Scotland

- Date: Saturday, June 5
- Game time: 2:05 p.m. BST
- Game attendance: 10,013
- Referee: Walt Coleman
