= 2004 Berlin Thunder season =

NFL Europe team season

- General manager: Michael Lang
- Head coach: Rick Lantz
- Home stadium: Olympic Stadium

Results
- Record: 9–1
- Division place: 1st
- Playoffs: World Bowl XII champion

The 2004 Berlin Thunder season was the sixth season for the franchise in the NFL Europe League (NFLEL). The team was led by head coach Rick Lantz in his first year, and played its home games at Olympic Stadium in Berlin, Germany. They finished the regular season in first place with a record of nine wins and one loss. In World Bowl XII, Berlin defeated the Frankfurt Galaxy 30–24. The victory marked the franchise's third World Bowl championship.

== Offseason ==
=== Free agent draft ===
2004 Berlin Thunder NFLEL free agent draft selections
Draft order		Player name	Position	College
Round	Choice	Player name	Position	College
1	1	James Thornton	CB	Morris Brown
2	7	T. J. Bingham	DE	Ouichita Baptist
3	18	Yubrenal Isabelle	LB	Virginia
4	19	Troy Andrew	G	Duke
5	30	DeShaun Hill	S	USC
6	31	DeVonte Peterson	DT	Catawba
7	42	Dwayne Pierce	G	LSU
9	43	Mike Malan	FB	Brown
9	54	Oliver Celestin	S	Texas Southern
10	55	Keith Heyward-Johnson	CB	Oregon State
11	66	Jeff Grzeskowiak	T	Akron
12	67	Michael Jennings	WR	Florida State

== Personnel ==
=== Staff ===
2004 Berlin Thunder staff
Front office: General manager – Michael Lang; Head coaches: Head coach – Rick Lantz; Offensive coaches: Offensive coordinator/offensive line – Don Eck; Quarterbacks/wide receivers – Steve Logan; Running backs – Amp Lee; Offensive line/tight ends – Reggie McElroy	Defensive coaches: Defensive coordinator – Jim Tomsula; National coach/linebackers/special teams – Shuan Fatah; Defensive backs – Rick Smith; Defensive assistant – D'Marco Farr; Strength and conditioning: Strength and conditioning – Martin Streight

=== Roster ===
2004 Berlin Thunder final roster
Quarterbacks: 7 Rohan Davey; 14 Marc Dunn; 12 David Rivers; Running backs: 33 Ray Jackson (IR); 25 Eric McCoo; 40 Ed Stansbury; Wide receivers: 86 Bosley Allen; 87 Richard Alston; 82 Aaron Boone; 83 Chas Gessner; 80 LaShaun Ward; Tight ends: 88 Bryan Fletcher; 85 Mike Pinkard	Offensive linemen: 65 Troy Andrew G; 69 Ben Claxton C; 79 Dante Ellington T; 70 Jason Jowers T; 75 Dave Kadela T; 76 Dion Meredith T (IR); 77 Jamil Soriano G; Defensive linemen: 99 T. J. Bingham DE; 97 LaWaylon Brown DT; 93 Israel Idonije DE/DT; 95 DeVonte Peterson DT; 94 Tank Reese DT; 96 Montique Sharpe DT; 98 Corey Smith DE	Linebackers: 54 Kevin DeRonde OLB; 53 Lawrence Flugence OLB; 56 Brenden Givan MLB; 57 Jason Kazar OLB; Defensive backs: 28 Oliver Celestin SS/FS; 27 Keith Davis FS; 36 Scott Farley SS; 22 Willie Ford CB; 21 Jermaine Mays CB; 24 Darrell Rideaux CB; 26 James Thornton CB; Special teams: 2 Hayden Epstein P; 5 Jonathan Ruffin K	National players: 89 (Finland) Klaus Alinen TE; 62 (Mexico) Rolando Cantú G; 90 (Germany) Dennis Engelbrecht DT; 43 (France) Philippe Gardent OLB; 84 (Germany) Jörg Heckenbach WR; 35 (France) Patrice Kancel RB; 92 (Germany) Christian Mohr DE; 10 (Denmark) Heinz Quast K; 46 (Switzerland) Astor Schneider MLB; Rookies in italics

== Schedule ==
Week	Date	Kickoff (Note: All times local to where the game was played.)	Opponent	Results		Game site	Attendance
Week	Date	Kickoff	Opponent	Final score	Team record	Game site	Attendance
1	Sunday, April 4	4:00 p.m.	Scottish Claymores	W 20–14	1–0	Olympic Stadium	14,257
2	Saturday, April 10	7:00 p.m.	at Amsterdam Admirals	W 28–17	2–0	Amsterdam ArenA	10,763
3	Sunday, April 18	4:00 p.m.	Cologne Centurions	W 35–31	3–0	Olympic Stadium	12,036
4	Saturday, April 24	7:00 p.m.	at Rhein Fire	W 14–10	4–0	Arena AufSchalke	20,242
5	Sunday, May 2	4:00 p.m.	Amsterdam Admirals	W 33–29	5–0	Olympic Stadium	12,909
6	Saturday, May 8	7:00 p.m.	at Cologne Centurions	L 27–28	5–1	RheinEnergieStadion	10,164
7	Sunday, May 16	4:00 p.m.	Rhein Fire	W 33–20	6–1	Olympic Stadium	15,429
8	Saturday, May 22	7:00 p.m.	at Frankfurt Galaxy	W 31–27	7–1	Waldstadion	30,812
9	Saturday, May 29	2:00 p.m.	at Scottish Claymores	W 27–19	8–1	Hampden Park	9,153
10	Sunday, June 6	4:00 p.m.	Frankfurt Galaxy	W 41–0	9–1	Olympic Stadium	19,175
World Bowl XII
11	Saturday, June 12	6:00 p.m.	Frankfurt Galaxy	W 30–24	10–1	Arena AufSchalke	35,413

== Standings ==
NFL Europe League
Team	W	L	T	PCT	PF	PA	Home	Road	STK
Berlin Thunder	9	1	0	.900	289	195	5–0	4–1	W4
Frankfurt Galaxy	7	3	0	.700	212	192	4–1	3–2	L1
Amsterdam Admirals	5	5	0	.500	173	191	3–2	2–3	W2
Cologne Centurions	4	6	0	.400	191	201	3–2	1–4	W1
Rhein Fire	3	7	0	.300	161	178	3–2	0–5	L4
Scottish Claymores	2	8	0	.200	128	197	1–4	1–4	L2

== Game summaries ==
=== Week 1: vs Scottish Claymores ===
Week One: Scottish Claymores at Berlin Thunder – Game summary

Quarter	1	2	3	4	Total
Scotland	0	7	0	7	14
Berlin	0	10	7	3	20

at Olympic Stadium, Berlin, Germany

- Date: Sunday, April 4
- Game time: 4:00 p.m. CEST
- Game attendance: 14,257
- Referee: Gerald Austin

=== Week 2: at Amsterdam Admirals ===
Week Two: Berlin Thunder at Amsterdam Admirals – Game summary

Quarter	1	2	3	4	Total
Berlin	0	7	14	7	28
Amsterdam	0	10	0	7	17

at Amsterdam ArenA, Amsterdam, Netherlands

- Date: Saturday, April 10
- Game time: 7:07 p.m. CEST
- Game attendance: 10,763
- Referee: Carl Cheffers

=== Week 3: vs Cologne Centurions ===
Week Three: Cologne Centurions at Berlin Thunder – Game summary

Quarter	1	2	3	4	Total
Cologne	7	14	3	7	31
Berlin	21	7	7	0	35

at Olympic Stadium, Berlin, Germany

- Date: Sunday, April 18
- Game time: 4:06 p.m. CEST
- Game attendance: 12,036
- Referee: Bill Vinovich

=== Week 4: at Rhein Fire ===
Week Four: Berlin Thunder at Rhein Fire – Game summary

Quarter	1	2	3	4	Total
Berlin	0	0	0	14	14
Rhein	7	3	0	0	10

at Arena AufSchalke, Gelsenkirchen, Germany

- Date: Saturday, April 24
- Game time: 7:04 p.m. CEST
- Game attendance: 20,242
- Referee: Gene Steratore

=== Week 5: vs Amsterdam Admirals ===
Week Five: Amsterdam Admirals at Berlin Thunder – Game summary

Quarter	1	2	3	4	Total
Amsterdam	0	7	7	15	29
Berlin	0	12	7	14	33

at Olympic Stadium, Berlin, Germany

- Date: Sunday, May 2
- Game time: 4:06 p.m. CEST
- Game attendance: 12,909
- Referee: Ed Hochuli

=== Week 6: at Cologne Centurions ===
Week Six: Berlin Thunder at Cologne Centurions – Game summary

Quarter	1	2	3	4	Total
Berlin	7	7	0	13	27
Cologne	14	0	7	7	28

at RheinEnergieStadion, Cologne, Germany

- Date: Saturday, May 8
- Game time: 7:04 p.m. CEST
- Game attendance: 10,164
- Referee: John Parry

=== Week 7: vs Rhein Fire ===
Week Seven: Rhein Fire at Berlin Thunder – Game summary

Quarter	1	2	3	4	Total
Rhein	0	0	7	13	20
Berlin	3	14	7	9	33

at Olympic Stadium, Berlin, Germany

- Date: Sunday, May 16
- Game time: 4:06 p.m. CEST
- Game attendance: 15,429
- Referee: Carl Cheffers

=== Week 8: at Frankfurt Galaxy ===
Week Eight: Berlin Thunder at Frankfurt Galaxy – Game summary

Quarter	1	2	3	4	Total
Berlin	10	7	7	7	31
Frankfurt	0	20	7	0	27

at Waldstadion, Frankfurt, Germany

- Date: Saturday, May 22
- Game time: 7:08 p.m. CEST
- Game attendance: 30,812
- Referee: Gerald Austin

=== Week 9: at Scottish Claymores ===
Week Nine: Berlin Thunder at Scottish Claymores – Game summary

Quarter	1	2	3	4	Total
Berlin	0	6	7	14	27
Scotland	10	3	3	3	19

at Hampden Park, Glasgow, Scotland

- Date: Saturday, May 29
- Game time: 2:05 p.m. BST
- Game attendance: 9,153
- Referee: Walt Anderson

=== Week 10: vs Frankfurt Galaxy ===
Week Ten: Frankfurt Galaxy at Berlin Thunder – Game summary

Quarter	1	2	3	4	Total
Frankfurt	0	0	0	0	0
Berlin	3	17	7	14	41

at Olympic Stadium, Berlin, Germany

- Date: Sunday, June 6
- Game time: 4:15 p.m. CEST
- Game attendance: 19,175
- Referee: Bill Vinovich

=== World Bowl XII ===
World Bowl XII: Frankfurt Galaxy vs Berlin Thunder – Game summary

Quarter	1	2	3	4	Total
Frankfurt	3	7	0	14	24
Berlin	7	3	13	7	30

at Arena AufSchalke, Gelsenkirchen, Germany

- Date: Saturday, June 12
- Game time: 6:06 p.m. CEST
- Game weather: 60 °F (15.6 °C), roof closed
- Game attendance: 35,413
- Referee: Bill Vinovich
- TV announcers (FOX): Curt Menefee and Brian Baldinger
