= 2004 Rhein Fire season =

NFL Europe team season

- General manager: Alexander Leibkind
- Head coach: Pete Kuharchek
- Home stadium: Arena AufSchalke

Results
- Record: 3–7
- Division place: 5th
- Playoffs: did not qualify

The 2004 Rhein Fire season was the tenth season for the franchise in the NFL Europe League (NFLEL). The team was led by head coach Pete Kuharchek in his fourth year, and played its home games at Arena AufSchalke in Gelsenkirchen, Germany. They finished the regular season in fifth place with a record of three wins and seven losses.

== Offseason ==
=== Free agent draft ===
2004 Rhein Fire NFLEL free agent draft selections
Draft order		Player name	Position	College
Round	Choice	Player name	Position	College
1	5	Randy Garner	DE	Arkansas
2	11	Maugaula Tuitele	LB	Colorado State
3	14	Daniel Wilcox	TE	Appalachian State
4	23	Earthwind Moreland	CB	Georgia Southern
5	26	Trey Freeman	DT	Stanford
6	35	Charles Burton	LB	Syracuse
7	38	Abdual Howard	S	Florida State
8	47	Reggie Poole	G	Jacksonville State
9	50	T. J. Watkins	T	Clemson
10	59	Corey Chamblin	CB	Tennessee Tech
11	62	Ryan Brewer	RB	South Carolina
12	71	Jon Clanton	DT	Nebraska
13	74	Melvin Paige	T	South Carolina

== Personnel ==
=== Staff ===
2004 Rhein Fire staff
Front office: General Manager – Alexander Leibkind; Head coaches: Head Coach – Pete Kuharchek; Offensive coaches: Offensive Coordinator/Offensive Line – Whitey Jordan; Quarterbacks – Scott Milanovich; Running Backs – Kevin O’Neal; Wide Receivers – Jeff Ogden	Defensive coaches: Defensive Coordinator/Defensive Backs/Special Teams – Adrian White; Defensive Line – Ken Clarke; National Coach/Linebackers – Jörn Maier; Defensive Assistant – James Harrell; Strength and conditioning: Strength and Conditioning – Juney Barnett

=== Roster ===
2004 Rhein Fire final roster
Quarterbacks: 13 Bret Engemann; 7 Chad Hutchinson; 12 Greg Zolman; Running backs: 21 Ryan Brewer; 36 Henri Childs; 26 Joffrey Reynolds; 24 Walter Williams; Wide receivers: 83 Shockmain Davis; 86 Adam Herzing; 85 Nate Jackson; 84 Jon Olinger; 80 Willie Quinnie; Tight ends: 47 Dwayne Blakley; 45 Daniel Wilcox	Offensive linemen: 70 Kevin Breedlove G; 79 Pita Elisara T/G; 66 Steven Grace C; 75 Chuck Klabo T; 64 Sean O’Connor G; 73 Melvin Paige T; 77 Chris Ziemann T; Defensive linemen: 96 Chris Demaree DE; 97 Randy Garner DE; 99 Sean Guthrie DE; 91 Cedric Killings DT; 92 David Nugent DT; 95 David Thompson DT	Linebackers: 58 Wes Bautovich OLB; 51 Charles Burton OLB; 53 James Harrison OLB; 50 Curtis Randall OLB; 52 Terrence Robinson MLB; 55 Maugaula Tuitele MLB/OLB; Defensive backs: 23 Corey Chamblin CB; 25 Charles Drake SS; 20 Rober’ Freeman CB; 41 Abdual Howard FS; 37 Tony Lukins CB; 38 Earthwind Moreland CB; 35 Horace Willis CB; Special teams: 16 Brooks Barnard P; 1 Mike Shafer K	National players: 56 (Germany) Richard Adjei OLB; 8 (Germany) Ingo Anderbrügge K; 74 (Germany) Peter Heyer G; 60 (Sweden) Michael Jonsson G; 98 (Germany) Olaf Lang DE; 9 (Germany) Christopher Liess WR; 22 (France) Laurent Marceline RB; 94 (Switzerland) Thomas Reiser DT; 44 (France) Yoan Schnee TE; 40 (Germany) Richard Yancy SS; Rookies in italics

== Schedule ==
Week	Date	Kickoff (Note: All times local to where the game was played.)	Opponent	Results		Game site	Attendance
Week	Date	Kickoff	Opponent	Final score	Team record	Game site	Attendance
1	Sunday, April 4	4:00 p.m.	Cologne Centurions	W 26–25	1–0	Arena AufSchalke	22,736
2	Saturday, April 10	7:00 p.m.	Scottish Claymores	W 31–3	2–0	Arena AufSchalke	17,176
3	Saturday, April 17	7:00 p.m.	at Frankfurt Galaxy	L 10–28	2–1	Waldstadion	27,213
4	Saturday, April 24	7:00 p.m.	Berlin Thunder	L 10–14	2–2	Arena AufSchalke	20,242
5	Sunday, May 2	2:00 p.m.	at Scottish Claymores	L 12–13	2–3	Hampden Park	9,165
6	Sunday, May 9	4:00 p.m.	Amsterdam Admirals	W 20–13	3–3	Arena AufSchalke	18,790
7	Sunday, May 16	4:00 p.m.	at Berlin Thunder	L 20–33	3–4	Olympic Stadium	15,429
8	Sunday, May 23	4:00 p.m.	at Cologne Centurions	L 6–7	3–5	RheinEnergieStadion	20,354
9	Saturday, May 29	7:00 p.m.	Frankfurt Galaxy	L 14–20 ^{OT}	3–6	Arena AufSchalke	26,417
10	Sunday, June 6	3:00 p.m.	at Amsterdam Admirals	L 12–22	3–7	Amsterdam ArenA	15,874

== Standings ==
NFL Europe League
Team	W	L	T	PCT	PF	PA	Home	Road	STK
Berlin Thunder	9	1	0	.900	289	195	5–0	4–1	W4
Frankfurt Galaxy	7	3	0	.700	212	192	4–1	3–2	L1
Amsterdam Admirals	5	5	0	.500	173	191	3–2	2–3	W2
Cologne Centurions	4	6	0	.400	191	201	3–2	1–4	W1
Rhein Fire	3	7	0	.300	161	178	3–2	0–5	L4
Scottish Claymores	2	8	0	.200	128	197	1–4	1–4	L2

== Game summaries ==
=== Week 1: vs Cologne Centurions ===
Week One: Cologne Centurions at Rhein Fire – Game summary

Quarter	1	2	3	4	Total
Cologne	10	6	3	6	25
Rhein	14	3	7	2	26

at Arena AufSchalke, Gelsenkirchen, Germany

- Date: Sunday, April 4
- Game time: 4:08 p.m. CEST
- Game attendance: 22,736
- Referee: Carl Cheffers

=== Week 2: vs Scottish Claymores ===
Week Two: Scottish Claymores at Rhein Fire – Game summary

Quarter	1	2	3	4	Total
Scotland	3	0	0	0	3
Rhein	0	10	14	7	31

at Arena AufSchalke, Gelsenkirchen, Germany

- Date: Saturday, April 10
- Game time: 7:07 p.m. CEST
- Game attendance: 17,176
- Referee: Walt Coleman

=== Week 3: at Frankfurt Galaxy ===
Week Three: Rhein Fire at Frankfurt Galaxy – Game summary

Quarter	1	2	3	4	Total
Rhein	7	3	0	0	10
Frankfurt	7	14	7	0	28

at Waldstadion, Frankfurt, Germany

- Date: Saturday, April 17
- Game time: 7:08 p.m. CEST
- Game attendance: 27,213
- Referee: Walt Anderson

=== Week 4: vs Berlin Thunder ===
Week Four: Berlin Thunder at Rhein Fire – Game summary

Quarter	1	2	3	4	Total
Berlin	0	0	0	14	14
Rhein	7	3	0	0	10

at Arena AufSchalke, Gelsenkirchen, Germany

- Date: Saturday, April 24
- Game time: 7:04 p.m. CEST
- Game attendance: 20,242
- Referee: Gene Steratore

=== Week 5: at Scottish Claymores ===
Week Five: Rhein Fire at Scottish Claymores – Game summary

Quarter	1	2	3	4	Total
Rhein	3	0	6	3	12
Scotland	7	0	0	6	13

at Hampden Park, Glasgow, Scotland

- Date: Sunday, May 2
- Game time: 2:05 p.m. BST
- Game attendance: 9,165
- Referee: John Parry

=== Week 6: vs Amsterdam Admirals ===
Week Six: Amsterdam Admirals at Rhein Fire – Game summary

Quarter	1	2	3	4	Total
Amsterdam	0	3	7	3	13
Rhein	14	0	3	3	20

at Arena AufSchalke, Gelsenkirchen, Germany

- Date: Sunday, May 9
- Game time: 4:06 p.m. CEST
- Game attendance: 18,790
- Referee: John Parry

=== Week 7: at Berlin Thunder ===
Week Seven: Rhein Fire at Berlin Thunder – Game summary

Quarter	1	2	3	4	Total
Rhein	0	0	7	13	20
Berlin	3	14	7	9	33

at Olympic Stadium, Berlin, Germany

- Date: Sunday, May 16
- Game time: 4:06 p.m. CEST
- Game attendance: 15,429
- Referee: Carl Cheffers

=== Week 8: at Cologne Centurions ===
Week Eight: Rhein Fire at Cologne Centurions – Game summary

Quarter	1	2	3	4	Total
Rhein	0	6	0	0	6
Cologne	0	0	7	0	7

at RheinEnergieStadion, Cologne, Germany

- Date: Sunday, May 23
- Game time: 4:07 p.m. CEST
- Game attendance: 20,354
- Referee: Gene Steratore

=== Week 9: vs Frankfurt Galaxy ===
Week Nine: Frankfurt Galaxy at Rhein Fire – Game summary

Quarter	1	2	3	4	OT	Total
Frankfurt	0	7	0	7	6	20
Rhein	7	0	7	0	0	14

at Arena AufSchalke, Gelsenkirchen, Germany

- Date: Saturday, May 29
- Game time: 7:06 p.m. CEST
- Game attendance: 26,417
- Referee: Walt Coleman

=== Week 10: at Amsterdam Admirals ===
Week Ten: Rhein Fire at Amsterdam Admirals – Game summary

Quarter	1	2	3	4	Total
Rhein	0	6	6	0	12
Amsterdam	7	0	8	7	22

at Amsterdam ArenA, Amsterdam, Netherlands

- Date: Sunday, June 6
- Game time: 3:05 p.m. CEST
- Game attendance: 15,874
- Referee: Walt Anderson
