= 2004 Frankfurt Galaxy season =

NFL Europe team season

- General manager: Tilman Engel
- Head coach: Mike Jones
- Home stadium: Waldstadion

Results
- Record: 7–3
- Division place: 2nd
- Playoffs: Lost World Bowl XII

The 2004 Frankfurt Galaxy season was the 12th season for the franchise in the NFL Europe League (NFLEL). The team was led by head coach Mike Jones in his first year, and played its home games at Waldstadion in Frankfurt, Germany. They finished the regular season in second place with a record of seven wins and three losses. In World Bowl XII, Frankfurt lost to the Berlin Thunder 30–24.

== Offseason ==
=== Free agent draft ===
2004 Frankfurt Galaxy NFLEL free agent draft selections
| Draft order | | Player name | Position | College |
| Round | Choice | Player name | Position | College |
|---|---|---|---|---|
| 1 | 6 | Chris Edmonds | TE | West Virginia |
| 2 | 12 | Bary Holleyman | DE | Oklahoma |
| 3 | 13 | Sean O'Connor | G | Syracuse |
| 4 | 24 | Chad Hayes | TE | Maine |
| 5 | 25 | Drew Haddad | WR | Buffalo |
| 6 | 36 | Corey McIntyre | FB | West Virginia |
| 7 | 37 | Dustin Cohen | LB | Miami (Ohio) |
| 8 | 48 | John Schlecht | DT | Minnesota |
| 9 | 49 | Tim Stuber | G | Colorado State |
| 10 | 60 | Ralph Parent | S | Boston College |
| 11 | 61 | Josh McKibben | DT | Central Florida |
| 12 | 72 | Brian Mance | CB | Clemson |
| 13 | 73 | Al Jackson | G | Louisiana State |

== Personnel ==
=== Staff ===
2004 Frankfurt Galaxy (NFL Europe) staff
| Front office: General manager – Tilman Engel; Head coaches: Head coach – Mike Jones; Offensive coaches: Offensive coordinator/quarterbacks/wide receivers – Dwain Painter; National coach/running backs – Patrick Esume; Offensive line – Don Lawrence; Tight ends – Ben Coates | Defensive coaches: Defensive coordinator/linebackers – Ed O'Neil; Defensive line – Richard Wood; Defensive backs/special teams – Ken Stills; Assistant linebackers – Dwight Hollier; Strength and conditioning: Strength and conditioning – George Bardis |

=== Roster ===
2004 Frankfurt Galaxy final roster
| Quarterbacks: 14 Kirk Farmer; 4 J. T. O'Sullivan; 10 David Priestley; Running backs: 29 Jeff Chaney; 33 Leonard Henry; 42 Skip Hicks; 44 Corey McIntyre; Wide receivers: 2 Drew Haddad; 87 Derrick Lewis; 82 Jermaine Lewis; 84 Jason Willis; Tight ends: 81 Chris Edmonds; 80 Chad Hayes; 88 Leonard Stephens | Offensive linemen: 72 Konrad Dean G; 64 Jasen Esposito G; 50 Johnathan Ingram C; 75 Jason Jimenez T; 52 Ben Nowland C/G; 74 David Pruce T; 63 Tim Stuber G; Defensive linemen: 99 Clenton Ballard DT; 91 Aubrayo Franklin DT; 92 Jeff Hazuga DE; 98 Corey Jackson DE; 93 John Schlecht DT; 94 Bobby Setzer DE | Linebackers: 58 Robert Chapman OLB; 56 Dustin Cohen OLB; 54 Asa Francis OLB; 45 Shawn Price OLB; 53 Mason Unck MLB; Defensive backs: 21 Allan Amundson CB; 35 Ahmad Brooks CB; 31 Chris Brown SS; 26 Lynaris Elpheage CB; 27 Chris Kern CB; 30 Ralph Parent FS/SS; 23 Ricky Sharpe FS; Special teams: 7 Mike Barr P; 8 Jamie Rheem K | National players: 22 (France) Foad Ajdir CB; 90 (Germany) Daniel Benetka DT; 9 (Germany) Ralf Kleinmann K; 20 (Germany) Martin Latka RB; 85 (Mexico) Hugo Lira WR; 76 (Germany) Andre Mathes T; 59 (Mexico) Jose Ruiz OLB; 19 (France) Marc Soumah WR; 46 (Turkey) Cüneyt Topcu MLB; 60 (Germany) Patrick Venzke T; Rookies in italics |

== Schedule ==
| Week | Date | Kickoff (Note: All times local to where the game was played.) | Opponent | Results | | Game site | Attendance |
| Week | Date | Kickoff | Opponent | Final score | Team record | Game site | Attendance |
|---|---|---|---|---|---|---|---|
| 1 | Saturday, April 3 | 7:00 p.m. | Amsterdam Admirals | W 34–11 | 1–0 | Waldstadion | 21,269 |
| 2 | Saturday, April 10 | 7:00 p.m. | at Cologne Centurions | W 20–10 | 2–0 | RheinEnergieStadion | 9,134 |
| 3 | Saturday, April 17 | 7:00 p.m. | Rhein Fire | W 28–10 | 3–0 | Waldstadion | 27,213 |
| 4 | Sunday, April 25 | 3:00 p.m. | at Amsterdam Admirals | L 17–21 ^{OT} | 3–1 | Amsterdam ArenA | 10,684 |
| 5 | Saturday, May 1 | 7:00 p.m. | Cologne Centurions | W 24–17 | 4–1 | Waldstadion | 24,117 |
| 6 | Sunday, May 9 | 2:00 p.m. | at Scottish Claymores | W 15–13 | 5–1 | Hampden Park | 9,017 |
| 7 | Sunday, May 16 | 4:00 p.m | Scottish Claymores | W 27–24 | 6–1 | Waldstadion | 26,879 |
| 8 | Saturday, May 22 | 7:00 p.m. | Berlin Thunder | L 27–31 | 6–2 | Waldstadion | 30,812 |
| 9 | Saturday, May 29 | 7:00 p.m. | at Rhein Fire | W 20–14 ^{OT} | 7–2 | Arena AufSchalke | 26,417 |
| 10 | Sunday, June 6 | 4:00 p.m. | at Berlin Thunder | L 0–41 | 7–3 | Olympic Stadium | 19,175 |
World Bowl XII
| 11 | Saturday, June 12 | 6:00 p.m. | Berlin Thunder | L 24–30 | 7–4 | Arena AufSchalke | 35,413 |

== Standings ==
NFL Europe League
| Team | W | L | T | PCT | PF | PA | Home | Road | STK |
|---|---|---|---|---|---|---|---|---|---|
| Berlin Thunder | 9 | 1 | 0 | .900 | 289 | 195 | 5–0 | 4–1 | W4 |
| Frankfurt Galaxy | 7 | 3 | 0 | .700 | 212 | 192 | 4–1 | 3–2 | L1 |
| Amsterdam Admirals | 5 | 5 | 0 | .500 | 173 | 191 | 3–2 | 2–3 | W2 |
| Cologne Centurions | 4 | 6 | 0 | .400 | 191 | 201 | 3–2 | 1–4 | W1 |
| Rhein Fire | 3 | 7 | 0 | .300 | 161 | 178 | 3–2 | 0–5 | L4 |
| Scottish Claymores | 2 | 8 | 0 | .200 | 128 | 197 | 1–4 | 1–4 | L2 |

== Game summaries ==
=== Week 1: vs Amsterdam Admirals ===
Week One: Amsterdam Admirals at Frankfurt Galaxy – Game summary

| Quarter | 1 | 2 | 3 | 4 | Total |
|---|---|---|---|---|---|
| Amsterdam | 3 | 0 | 0 | 8 | 11 |
| Frankfurt | 0 | 17 | 7 | 10 | 34 |

at Waldstadion, Frankfurt, Germany

- Date: Saturday, April 3
- Game time: 7:10 p.m. CEST
- Game attendance: 21,269
- Referee: Gerald Austin

=== Week 2: at Cologne Centurions ===
Week Two: Frankfurt Galaxy at Cologne Centurions – Game summary

| Quarter | 1 | 2 | 3 | 4 | Total |
|---|---|---|---|---|---|
| Frankfurt | 7 | 0 | 0 | 13 | 20 |
| Cologne | 3 | 0 | 0 | 7 | 10 |

at RheinEnergieStadion, Cologne, Germany

- Date: Saturday, April 10
- Game time: 7:04 p.m. CEST
- Game attendance: 9,134
- Referee: Gerald Austin

=== Week 3: vs Rhein Fire ===
Week Three: Rhein Fire at Frankfurt Galaxy – Game summary

| Quarter | 1 | 2 | 3 | 4 | Total |
|---|---|---|---|---|---|
| Rhein | 7 | 3 | 0 | 0 | 10 |
| Frankfurt | 7 | 14 | 7 | 0 | 28 |

at Waldstadion, Frankfurt, Germany

- Date: Saturday, April 17
- Game time: 7:08 p.m. CEST
- Game attendance: 27,213
- Referee: Walt Anderson

=== Week 4: at Amsterdam Admirals ===
Week Four: Frankfurt Galaxy at Amsterdam Admirals – Game summary

| Quarter | 1 | 2 | 3 | 4 | OT | Total |
|---|---|---|---|---|---|---|
| Frankfurt | 7 | 3 | 7 | 0 | 0 | 17 |
| Amsterdam | 0 | 7 | 3 | 7 | 4 | 21 |

at Amsterdam ArenA, Amsterdam, Netherlands

- Date: Sunday, April 25
- Game time: 3:00 p.m. CEST
- Game attendance: 10,684
- Referee: Bill Vinovich

=== Week 5: vs Cologne Centurions ===
Week Five: Cologne Centurions at Frankfurt Galaxy – Game summary

| Quarter | 1 | 2 | 3 | 4 | Total |
|---|---|---|---|---|---|
| Cologne | 3 | 0 | 7 | 7 | 17 |
| Frankfurt | 3 | 14 | 0 | 7 | 24 |

at Waldstadion, Frankfurt, Germany

- Date: Saturday, May 1
- Game time: 7:08 p.m. CEST
- Game attendance: 24,117
- Referee: Ed Hochuli

=== Week 6: at Scottish Claymores ===
Week Six: Frankfurt Galaxy at Scottish Claymores – Game summary

| Quarter | 1 | 2 | 3 | 4 | Total |
|---|---|---|---|---|---|
| Frankfurt | 0 | 9 | 3 | 3 | 15 |
| Scotland | 3 | 3 | 0 | 7 | 13 |

at Hampden Park, Glasgow, Scotland

- Date: Sunday, May 9
- Game time: 2:05 p.m. BST
- Game attendance: 9,017
- Referee: Alberto Riveron

=== Week 7: vs Scottish Claymores ===
Week Seven: Scottish Claymores at Frankfurt Galaxy – Game summary

| Quarter | 1 | 2 | 3 | 4 | Total |
|---|---|---|---|---|---|
| Scotland | 3 | 7 | 7 | 7 | 24 |
| Frankfurt | 14 | 7 | 6 | 0 | 27 |

at Waldstadion, Frankfurt, Germany

- Date: Sunday, May 16
- Game time: 4:10 p.m. CEST
- Game attendance: 26,879
- Referee: Gene Steratore

=== Week 8: vs Berlin Thunder ===
Week Eight: Berlin Thunder at Frankfurt Galaxy – Game summary

| Quarter | 1 | 2 | 3 | 4 | Total |
|---|---|---|---|---|---|
| Berlin | 10 | 7 | 7 | 7 | 31 |
| Frankfurt | 0 | 20 | 7 | 0 | 27 |

at Waldstadion, Frankfurt, Germany

- Date: Saturday, May 22
- Game time: 7:08 p.m. CEST
- Game attendance: 30,812
- Referee: Gerald Austin

=== Week 9: at Rhein Fire ===
Week Nine: Frankfurt Galaxy at Rhein Fire – Game summary

| Quarter | 1 | 2 | 3 | 4 | OT | Total |
|---|---|---|---|---|---|---|
| Frankfurt | 0 | 7 | 0 | 7 | 6 | 20 |
| Rhein | 7 | 0 | 7 | 0 | 0 | 14 |

at Arena AufSchalke, Gelsenkirchen, Germany

- Date: Saturday, May 29
- Game time: 7:06 p.m. CEST
- Game attendance: 26,417
- Referee: Walt Coleman

=== Week 10: at Berlin Thunder ===
Week Ten: Frankfurt Galaxy at Berlin Thunder – Game summary

| Quarter | 1 | 2 | 3 | 4 | Total |
|---|---|---|---|---|---|
| Frankfurt | 0 | 0 | 0 | 0 | 0 |
| Berlin | 3 | 17 | 7 | 14 | 41 |

at Olympic Stadium, Berlin, Germany

- Date: Sunday, June 6
- Game time: 4:15 p.m. CEST
- Game attendance: 19,175
- Referee: Bill Vinovich

=== World Bowl XII ===
World Bowl XII: Frankfurt Galaxy vs Berlin Thunder – Game summary

| Quarter | 1 | 2 | 3 | 4 | Total |
|---|---|---|---|---|---|
| Frankfurt | 3 | 7 | 0 | 14 | 24 |
| Berlin | 7 | 3 | 13 | 7 | 30 |

at Arena AufSchalke, Gelsenkirchen, Germany

- Date: Saturday, June 12
- Game time: 6:06 p.m. CEST
- Game weather: 60 °F (15.6 °C), roof closed
- Game attendance: 35,413
- Referee: Bill Vinovich
- TV announcers (FOX): Curt Menefee and Brian Baldinger
