= Ben Claxton =

American football player (born 1980)

No. 69, 62
- Positions: Center, guard

Personal information
- Born: July 30, 1980 (age 46); Dublin, Georgia, U.S.
- Listed height: 6 ft 2 in (1.88 m)
- Listed weight: 301 lb (137 kg)

Career information
- High school: Dublin
- College: Ole Miss
- NFL draft: 2003: 5th round, 157th overall pick

Career history
- Denver Broncos (2003)*; Cleveland Browns (2003)*; Miami Dolphins (2003)*; Tampa Bay Buccaneers (2003)*; → Berlin Thunder (2004); Pittsburgh Steelers (2005)*; → Berlin Thunder (2005); Atlanta Falcons (2005–2006); Oakland Raiders (2007)*; Seattle Seahawks (2008)*; Detroit Lions (2008)*; Arizona Cardinals (2009–2010)
- * Offseason or practice squad member only

Awards and highlights
- World Bowl champion (2004); 2× All-NFL Europe (2004–2005); 2× Second-team All-SEC (2001, 2002); Freshman All-American (1999)

Career NFL statistics
- Games played: 3
- Stats at Pro Football Reference

Benjamin Claxton (born July 30, 1980) is an American former professional football player who was a center and guard in the National Football League (NFL) for the Atlanta Falcons and Arizona Cardinals. He was selected by the Denver Broncos in the fifth round of the 2003 NFL draft. He played college football for the Ole Miss Rebels.

Claxton was also a member of the Cleveland Browns, Miami Dolphins, Tampa Bay Buccaneers, Berlin Thunder, Pittsburgh Steelers, Oakland Raiders, Seattle Seahawks, and Detroit Lions.

== Early life ==
Claxton attended Dublin High School in Dublin, Georgia.

== College career ==
Claxton played college football for the Ole Miss Rebels, starting 37 games during his college career. He earned Freshman All-American honors in 1999, and was named second-team All-SEC in both 2001 and 2002. He also played in the 2003 Senior Bowl.

== Professional career ==
Pre-draft measurables
Height	Weight	Arm length	Hand span	40-yard dash	10-yard split	20-yard split	20-yard shuttle	Three-cone drill	Vertical jump	Broad jump
6 ft 2 in (1.88 m)	301 lb (137 kg)	31 in (0.79 m)	9 3/4 in (0.25 m)	5.33 s	1.81 s	3.02 s	4.69 s	7.81 s	27 in (0.69 m)	8 ft 6 in (2.59 m)
All values from NFL Combine.

Claxton was selected by the Denver Broncos in the fifth round, with the 157th overall pick, of the 2003 NFL draft. He officially signed with the team on July 23, 2003. He was waived on August 26, 2003.

Claxton was signed to the practice squad of the Cleveland Browns on October 20, 2003. He was released on November 4, 2003.

He was signed to the Miami Dolphins' practice squad on November 19, 2003. He was released on December 9, 2003.

Claxton was signed to the Tampa Bay Buccaneers' practice squad on December 16, 2003. He signed a reserve/future contract with the Buccaneers on December 29, 2003. He was allocated to NFL Europe, where he played for the Berlin Thunder during the 2004 NFL Europe season. Claxton started all 10 games for the Thunder and helped them win World Bowl XII while also earning All-NFL Europe honors. He was waived by the Buccaneers on September 5, 2004.

Claxton signed with the Pittsburgh Steelers on February 3, 2005. He was allocated to NFL Europe to play for the Thunder for the second consecutive year in 2005. He once again started all 10 games for the Thunder but this time the team lost World Bowl XIII. Claxton also garnered All-NFL Europe recognition for the second straight year. He was waived on September 3, 2005.

Claxton was signed by the Atlanta Falcons on September 4, 2005. He played in two games for the Falcons during the 2005 season. He was waived/injured on August 29, 2006 and reverted to injured reserve the next day. Claxton re-signed with the team on March 19, 2007. He was waived on May 2, 2007.

Claxton signed with the Oakland Raiders on May 3, 2007. He was waived/injured on August 14 and reverted to injured reserve the next day. He was waived by the Raiders on August 20, 2007.

In August 2008, Claxton was preparing to take the LSAT when he scheduled a workout with the New England Patriots. By the time he arrived, the team had already signed someone else. His agent informed him that the Seattle Seahawks were interested, and after a workout the team signed him on August 3. He was waived on August 30, 2008.

Claxton was signed to the Detroit Lions' practice squad on September 8, 2008.

He signed with the Arizona Cardinals on January 7, 2009. He played in one game for the Cardinals during the 2009 season. He re-signed with the team on March 17, 2010, and again on July 30, 2011. Calton was released by the Cardinals on September 3, 2011.

Claxton was a member of 10 different NFL teams over eight seasons but only played in three NFL games.

== Post-football career ==
Claxton graduated from the Mississippi College School of Law in 2015 and now works as a lawyer.
