= Richard Alston (gridiron football) =

American football player (born 1980)

No. 89
- Position: Wide receiver

Personal information
- Born: November 20, 1980 (age 45); Newark, New Jersey, U.S.
- Listed height: 5 ft 11 in (1.80 m)
- Listed weight: 215 lb (98 kg)

Career information
- High school: Warren County (NC)
- College: East Carolina
- NFL draft: 2003: undrafted

Career history
- 2003: Cleveland Browns*
- 2004: Berlin Thunder
- 2004–2005: Cleveland Browns
- 2006: Edmonton Eskimos
- 2007: Hamilton Tiger-Cats
- 2008: Cleveland Gladiators*
- * Offseason or practice squad member only

Career NFL statistics
- Return yards: 1,016
- Return touchdowns: 1
- Stats at Pro Football Reference

Richard Alston (born November 20, 1980) is an American former professional football wide receiver and return specialist who played for the Cleveland Browns of the National Football League (NFL). He also played for the Edmonton Eskimos and Hamilton Tiger-Cats of the Canadian Football League (CFL).

Alston played college football for the East Carolina Pirates as a quarterback, running back, and wide receiver. While at East Carolina University, Alston studied economics. After failing to make the Browns' regular season roster in 2003, he was allocated to the Berlin Thunder of NFL Europe, where he became a World Bowl champion. Alston played as a kick returner for the Browns in 2004 before playing in the CFL from 2006 to 2007.

== College career ==
Alston played high school football at Warren County High School in Warrenton, North Carolina as a quarterback. He later attended college at East Carolina University, where he played for the Pirates from 1999 to 2002. As a freshman, Alston was used by the Pirates coaching staff in tandem with sophomore teammate David Garrard as a quarterback. As Garrard's usage increased going into his junior and senior years, the Pirates coaching staff tried out Alston at several different positions. After starting the 2001 season as a running back, Alston was converted mid-season to a wide receiver, the position in which he would play out the rest of his college and professional careers. In his final year with the Pirates, Alston led the team with 702 receiving yards on 36 catches, adding six touchdowns.

== Professional career ==
Alston went undrafted in the 2003 NFL draft. He was signed by the Cleveland Browns of the National Football League in May 2003. Alston did not make the Browns' regular season roster, but he was allocated to the Berlin Thunder of NFL Europe. While with the Thunder in 2004, Alston threw a touchdown pass to wide receiver Chas Gessner in World Bowl XII. The trick play, which had Alston line up as a receiver before throwing the ball, helped the Thunder defeat the Frankfurt Galaxy 30–24 to become World Bowl champions.

In 2004, Alston returned to the Browns. While he was not valuable to the Browns at wide receiver, the team used him as a return specialist. In a November game against the Baltimore Ravens, Alston scored his first NFL touchdown after returning the opening kickoff 93 yards. He played in nine regular season games in 2004 returning kickoffs. Alston returned to the Browns' training camp in 2005, where he competed with André Davis and Josh Cribbs to remain a kick returner. The Browns released Alston in their final round of cuts.

The Edmonton Eskimos of the CFL signed Alston in 2006. In training camp, he competed with several other import receivers for a roster spot, including former Denver Broncos player Chris Cole. The coaching staff also evaluated him along with Tony Tompkins and Toby Zeigler to return kicks. Alston solidified his spot on the roster by leading the team in preseason catches. Alston remained on the roster into the regular season. After Eskimos wide receiver Trevor Gaylor dropped a pass near the Eskimos sideline during Week 1, the Eskimos coaching staff removed Gaylor from the starting lineup. Alston started his first game in the CFL the following week against the Calgary Stampeders. He suffered an ankle injury during his first start, but he quickly recovered to catch three passes for 76 yards two weeks later against the BC Lions. In August, Gaylor reclaimed his starting position from Alston after Alston dropped a long pass in a game against the Winnipeg Blue Bombers. Alston finished the regular season with seven games played, recording 23 catches for 261 yards and a single two-point conversion. Although the Eskimos had considered him as a potential kick returner in training camp, he returned only one kickoff along with three punts.

In February 2007, the Eskimos traded Alston to the Hamilton Tiger-Cats. The deal also sent Nicolas Bisaillon, Timmy Chang, and a draft pick to the Tiger-Cats in exchange for defensive back Jason Goss. The Tiger-Cats receiver corps were considered a weakness going into the 2007 season, and the team tried out at least fourteen receivers in training camp. In mid-June, The Hamilton Spectator reported that Alston was showing potential in training camp and had a "leg up" to make the team. Alston made the active roster for the regular season and played in one game for the Tiger-Cats, but he was released in early July. He briefly signed with the Cleveland Gladiators of the Arena Football League in November 2007, but the Gladiators released Alston in February 2008 before the start of the regular season.
