= Chris Kern =

American football player (born 1979)

No. 27, 39
- Position: Cornerback

Personal information
- Born: May 16, 1979 (age 47); Faribault, Minnesota, U.S.
- Listed height: 5 ft 11 in (1.80 m)
- Listed weight: 196 lb (89 kg)

Career information
- High school: Faribault
- College: Mount Union
- NFL draft: 2003: undrafted

Career history
- Detroit Lions (2003–2004); → Frankfurt Galaxy (2004)

Awards and highlights
- 3× NCAA Division III national champion (2000–2002); 2× First-team All-American (2001–2002); 2× First-team All-OAC (2001–2002)
- Stats at Pro Football Reference

Christopher Albert Kern (born May 16, 1979) is an American former professional football cornerback who played one season with the Detroit Lions of the National Football League (NFL). He played college football for the Mount Union Purple Raiders. He was also a member of the Frankfurt Galaxy of NFL Europe.

== Early life and college ==
Christopher Albert Kern was born May 16, 1979, in Faribault, Minnesota, and attended Faribault High School. He played college football for the Mount Union Purple Raiders and was a three-time NCAA Division III national champion from 2000 to 2002. He was named first-team All-Ohio Athletic Conference in 2001 and 2002, a first-team All-American by the Football Gazette and D3football.com in 2001, and a first-team All-American by the Associated Press, American Football Coaches Association, Football Gazette, and D3football.com in 2002. Kern set the school record for career passes defended with 58. He was also a third-team CoSIDA Academic All-American in 2001 and a first-team CoSIDA Academic All-American in 2002. He was inducted into the University of Mount Union M Club Hall of Fame in 2023.

== Professional career ==
After going undrafted in the 2003 NFL draft, Kern signed with the Detroit Lions on May 2, 2003. He was waived on July 21 and later signed to the team's practice squad on December 16. He signed a reserve/future contract with the Lions on December 29, 2003.

In 2004, Kern was allocated to NFL Europe to play for the Frankfurt Galaxy during the 2004 NFL Europe season. He played in all 10 games for the Galaxy, recording six tackles on defense, ten tackles on specials teams, one interception, five pass breakups, and one forced fumble. The Galaxy advanced to World Bowl XII, where they lost to the Berlin Thunder. Kern played in two games for the Lions during the 2004 NFL season without recording any statistics before being waived on September 22, 2004.
