= 2004 Scottish Claymores season =

NFL Europe team season

- General manager: Steve Livingstone
- Head coach: Jack Bicknell
- Home stadium: Hampden Park

Results
- Record: 2–8
- Division place: 6th
- Playoffs: Did not qualify

The 2004 Scottish Claymores season was the tenth and final season for the franchise in the NFL Europe League (NFLEL). The team was led by head coach Jack Bicknell in his first year, and played its home games at Hampden Park in Glasgow, Scotland. They finished the regular season in sixth place with a record of two wins and eight losses.

== Offseason ==
=== Free agent draft ===
2004 Scottish Claymores NFLEL free agent draft selections
Draft order		Player name	Position	College
Round	Choice	Player name	Position	College
1	4	Ivory McCoy	DE	Michigan State
2	10	Gerald Dixon	CB	Alabama
3	15	James Lewis	S	Miami
4	22	Andy Bowers	DE	Utah
5	27	Gavin Walls	LB	Arkansas
6	34	Isaac Keys	LB	Morehouse College
7	39	Don McGee	CB	North Texas
8	46	Jermaine Chatman	CB	Arizona
9	51	J. J. Jones	LB	Arkansas
10	58	Vic Viloria	LB	Southern Methodist
11	63	Matt Anderle	T	Minnesota
12	70	DeRonnie Pitts	WR	Stanford
13	75	Todd Elstrom	WR	Washington

== Personnel ==
=== Staff ===
2004 Scottish Claymores staff
Front office: General manager – Steve Livingstone; Head coaches: Head coach – Jack Bicknell; Offensive coaches: Offensive coordinator/offensive line – Vince Martino; Quarterbacks/wide receivers – Sam Rutigliano; Running backs – Tim Lester; National coach/tight ends – Stephen McCusker	Defensive coaches: Defensive coordinator/defensive backs – Dan Daniel; Defensive line – Denauld Brown; Linebackers – Charles Jones; Assistant defensive backs – Tim Watson; Special teams coaches: National coach/special teams coordinator – Stephen McCusker; Strength and conditioning: Strength and conditioning – Dave Mikel

=== Roster ===
2004 Scottish Claymores final roster
Quarterbacks: 5 Curt Anes; 14 Tom Arth; 18 Nate Hybl; Running backs: 30 Ahmaad Galloway; 22 Maurice Hicks; 35 Ian Smart; Wide receivers: 88 Ronald Bellamy; 80 Terry Charles; 84 Nick Davis (IR); 10 Herb Haygood; 83 DeAndrew Rubin; Tight ends: 85 Aaron Golliday; 82 Marcus Helfman	Offensive linemen: 77 Reese Hicks T; 73 Doug Kaufusi G/T; 64 Curt McGill C; 72 Marques Ogden T; 70 Morgan Pears G/T; 65 Jimond Pugh C; 73 Chris Smith T; 76 Chad Ward G/T; 71 Todd Wike G; Defensive linemen: 96 Nick Eason DT; 75 Damian Gregory DT; 99 Alan Harper DT; 90 Ivory McCoy DE; 94 Durrand Roundtree DE; 95 Cedric Scott DE/DT; 98 Gavin Walls DE	Linebackers: 56 Howard Clark OLB; 52 J. J. Jones OLB; 55 Jimmy McClain MLB; 59 Ryan Myers OLB/MLB; Defensive backs: 26 Kahlil Carter CB; 27 Jermaine Chatman CB; 21 Gerald Dixon CB; 25 Brad Franklin CB; 20 James Lewis SS/FS; 23 Alphonso Roundtree CB; 28 Thomas Wright SS; Special teams: 7 Mark Jensen K; 9 Nick Murphy P	National players: 81 (Scotland) Scott Couper WR; 54 (England) Aden Durde OLB; 91 (England) Robert Flickinger DE; 8 (England) Rob Hart K; 33 (England) Warren Keen RB; 87 (England) Scott McCready WR; 46 (Scotland) Jeff Nicolson TE; 50 (Sweden) Jens Pettersson MLB; Rookies in italics

== Schedule ==
Week	Date	Kickoff (Note: All times local to where the game was played.)	Opponent	Results		Game site	Attendance
Week	Date	Kickoff	Opponent	Final score	Team record	Game site	Attendance
1	Sunday, 4 April	4:00 p.m.	at Berlin Thunder	L 14–20	0–1	Olympic Stadium	14,257
2	Saturday, 10 April	7:00 p.m.	at Rhein Fire	L 3–31	0–2	Arena AufSchalke	17,176
3	Sunday, 18 April	2:00 p.m.	Amsterdam Admirals	L 0–3	0–3	Hampden Park	10,971
4	Saturday, 24 April	7:00 p.m.	at Cologne Centurions	L 3–17	0–4	RheinEnergieStadion	8,761
5	Sunday, 2 May	2:00 p.m.	Rhein Fire	W 13–12	1–4	Hampden Park	9,165
6	Sunday, 9 May	2:00 p.m.	Frankfurt Galaxy	L 13–15	1–5	Hampden Park	9,017
7	Sunday, 16 May	4:00 p.m.	at Frankfurt Galaxy	L 24–27	1–6	Waldstadion	26,879
8	Friday, 21 May	8:00 p.m.	at Amsterdam Admirals	W 19–17	2–6	Amsterdam ArenA	10,738
9	Saturday, 29 May	2:00 p.m.	Berlin Thunder	L 19–27	2–7	Hampden Park	9,153
10	Saturday, 5 June	2:00 p.m.	Cologne Centurions	L 20–28	2–8	Hampden Park	10,013

== Standings ==
NFL Europe League
Team	W	L	T	PCT	PF	PA	Home	Road	STK
Berlin Thunder	9	1	0	.900	289	195	5–0	4–1	W4
Frankfurt Galaxy	7	3	0	.700	212	192	4–1	3–2	L1
Amsterdam Admirals	5	5	0	.500	173	191	3–2	2–3	W2
Cologne Centurions	4	6	0	.400	191	201	3–2	1–4	W1
Rhein Fire	3	7	0	.300	161	178	3–2	0–5	L4
Scottish Claymores	2	8	0	.200	128	197	1–4	1–4	L2

== Game summaries ==
=== Week 1: at Berlin Thunder ===
Week One: Scottish Claymores at Berlin Thunder – Game summary

Quarter	1	2	3	4	Total
Scotland	0	7	0	7	14
Berlin	0	10	7	3	20

at Olympic Stadium, Berlin, Germany

- Date: Sunday, 4 April
- Game time: 4:00 p.m. CEST
- Game attendance: 14,257
- Referee: Gerald Austin

=== Week 2: at Rhein Fire ===
Week Two: Scottish Claymores at Rhein Fire – Game summary

Quarter	1	2	3	4	Total
Scotland	3	0	0	0	3
Rhein	0	10	14	7	31

at Arena AufSchalke, Gelsenkirchen, Germany

- Date: Saturday, 10 April
- Game time: 7:07 p.m. CEST
- Game attendance: 17,176
- Referee: Walt Coleman

=== Week 3: vs Amsterdam Admirals ===
Week Three: Amsterdam Admirals at Scottish Claymores – Game summary

Quarter	1	2	3	4	Total
Amsterdam	3	0	0	0	3
Scotland	0	0	0	0	0

at Hampden Park, Glasgow, Scotland

- Date: Sunday, 18 April
- Game time: 2:00 p.m. BST
- Game attendance: 10,971
- Referee: Gene Steratore

=== Week 4: at Cologne Centurions ===
Week Four: Scottish Claymores at Cologne Centurions – Game summary

Quarter	1	2	3	4	Total
Scotland	3	0	0	0	3
Cologne	7	10	0	0	17

at RheinEnergieStadion, Cologne, Germany

- Date: Saturday, 24 April
- Game time: 7:06 p.m. CEST
- Game attendance: 8,761
- Referee: Walt Anderson

=== Week 5: vs Rhein Fire ===
Week Five: Rhein Fire at Scottish Claymores – Game summary

Quarter	1	2	3	4	Total
Rhein	3	0	6	3	12
Scotland	7	0	0	6	13

at Hampden Park, Glasgow, Scotland

- Date: Sunday, 2 May
- Game time: 2:05 p.m. BST
- Game attendance: 9,165
- Referee: John Parry

=== Week 6: vs Frankfurt Galaxy ===
Week Six: Frankfurt Galaxy at Scottish Claymores – Game summary

Quarter	1	2	3	4	Total
Frankfurt	0	9	3	3	15
Scotland	3	3	0	7	13

at Hampden Park, Glasgow, Scotland

- Date: Sunday, 9 May
- Game time: 2:05 p.m. BST
- Game attendance: 9,017
- Referee: Alberto Riveron

=== Week 7: at Frankfurt Galaxy ===
Week Seven: Scottish Claymores at Frankfurt Galaxy – Game summary

Quarter	1	2	3	4	Total
Scotland	3	7	7	7	24
Frankfurt	14	7	6	0	27

at Waldstadion, Frankfurt, Germany

- Date: Sunday, 16 May
- Game time: 4:10 p.m. CEST
- Game attendance: 26,879
- Referee: Gene Steratore

=== Week 8: at Amsterdam Admirals ===
Week Eight: Scottish Claymores at Amsterdam Admirals – Game summary

Quarter	1	2	3	4	Total
Scotland	3	13	0	3	19
Amsterdam	3	0	7	7	17

at Amsterdam ArenA, Amsterdam, Netherlands

- Date: Friday, 21 May
- Game time: 8:07 p.m. CEST
- Game attendance: 10,738
- Referee: Carl Cheffers

=== Week 9: vs Berlin Thunder ===
Week Nine: Berlin Thunder at Scottish Claymores – Game summary

Quarter	1	2	3	4	Total
Berlin	0	6	7	14	27
Scotland	10	3	3	3	19

at Hampden Park, Glasgow, Scotland

- Date: Saturday, 29 May
- Game time: 2:05 p.m. BST
- Game attendance: 9,153
- Referee: Walt Anderson

=== Week 10: vs Cologne Centurions ===
Week Ten: Cologne Centurions at Scottish Claymores – Game summary

Quarter	1	2	3	4	Total
Cologne	0	14	0	14	28
Scotland	0	7	13	0	20

at Hampden Park, Glasgow, Scotland

- Date: Saturday, 5 June
- Game time: 2:05 p.m. BST
- Game attendance: 10,013
- Referee: Walt Coleman
