= Montique Sharpe =

American football player (born 1980)

No. 61, 96
- Position: Defensive tackle

Personal information
- Born: March 10, 1980 (age 46); Washington, D.C., U.S.
- Listed height: 6 ft 2 in (1.88 m)
- Listed weight: 296 lb (134 kg)

Career information
- High school: Dunbar (Washington, D.C.)
- College: Wake Forest (1998–2002)
- NFL draft: 2003: 7th round, 230th overall pick

Career history
- Kansas City Chiefs (2003–2004); → Berlin Thunder (2004)

Awards and highlights
- World Bowl champion (XII)

Career NFL statistics
- Tackles: 4
- Sacks: 1
- Stats at Pro Football Reference

Montique Sharpe (born March 10, 1980) is an American former professional football player who was a defensive tackle for the Kansas City Chiefs of the National Football League (NFL). He was selected by the Chiefs in the seventh round of the 2003 NFL draft. Sharpe played college football at Wake Forest.

== Early life ==
Sharpe attended Dunbar High School in Washington, D.C.

== College career ==
Sharped played college football for the Wake Forest Demon Deacons from 1999 to 2002. He was redshirted in 1998. He earned honorable mention All-ACC honors his senior year in 2002.

== Professional career ==
Sharpe was selected by the Kansas City Chiefs in the seventh round of the 2003 NFL Draft. He officially signed with the team on July 21, 2003. He was placed on the Non-football injury list on August 26, 2003. Sharpe played in five games for the Chiefs during the 2003 season, recording four solo tackles and one sack.

Sharpe was allocated to NFL Europe in 2004 and played for the Berlin Thunder during the 2004 NFL Europe season. He appeared in 10 games, starting four, for the Thunder, totaling 10 tackles, one sack, one pass breakup and one blocked kick. The Thunder also won World Bowl XII that season. Sharpe was waived by the Chiefs on September 5, 2004 and signed to the team's practice squad on September 7, 2004. He signed a reserve/future contract with the Chiefs on January 17, 2005. He was waived on September 3, 2005.
