= Chris Ziemann =

American football player (born 1976)

No. 74
- Position: Offensive tackle

Personal information
- Born: September 20, 1976 (age 50); Aurora, Illinois
- Listed height: 6 ft 7 in (2.01 m)
- Listed weight: 315 lb (143 kg)

Career information
- High school: Waubonsie Valley (Aurora)
- College: Michigan
- NFL draft: 2000: undrafted

Career history
- New York Giants (2000–2001); Jacksonville Jaguars (2002); Tampa Bay Buccaneers (2004)*; → Rhein Fire (2004)
- * Offseason or practice squad member only

Awards and highlights
- AP college football national champion (1997)

Career NFL statistics
- Games played: 8
- Stats at Pro Football Reference

Christopher Robert Ziemann (born September 20, 1976) is an American former professional football player who was an offensive tackle in the National Football League (NFL). He played college football for the Michigan Wolverines and was part of their 1997 national championship team. Professionally, Ziemann played for the New York Giants of the NFL and Rhein Fire of NFL Europe.

== Early life and college career ==
A native of Aurora, Illinois, Ziemann graduated from Waubonsie Valley High School in 1995. At the University of Michigan, Ziemann played at defensive end, right guard, and right tackle for Michigan Wolverines football from 1996 to 1999 after redshirting the 1995 season. Having switched from defensive end to offensive line during spring camp, he was the starting right guard for the undefeated 1997 Michigan Wolverines football team that won the school's first national championship in 50 years. Ziemann graduated from Michigan with a degree in sports management communication.

== Professional career ==
Because of ankle injuries suffered while he was in college, Zieman was not drafted in the 2000 NFL draft. Despite not being drafted, Ziemann signed with the New York Giants and played eight games with the Giants in 2000 before a season-ending ACL injury in late October. During his time in the NFL, Zieman was 6 feet, 7 inches tall and weighed 315 pounds. He spent the 2001 season with the Giants practice squad.

He signed with the Jacksonville Jaguars in February 2002, but he spent the 2002 season on injured reserve. In May 2003, Ziemann was waived by the Jaguars.

In February 2004, Ziemann was signed by the Tampa Bay Buccaneers and allocated to the NFL Europe team Rhein Fire. With the Fire, Ziemannn played in 10 games with nine starts at right tackle. Ziemann was released by the Buccaneers in July 2004.
