= Dante Ellington =

American football player (born 1980)

No. 79, 68
- Position: Tackle

Personal information
- Born: February 29, 1980 (age 46); Leighton, Alabama, U.S.
- Listed height: 6 ft 6 in (1.98 m)
- Listed weight: 330 lb (150 kg)

Career information
- High school: Colbert County (Leighton)
- College: Alabama (1999–2002)
- NFL draft: 2003: undrafted

Career history
- Philadelphia Eagles (2003–2004)*; → Berlin Thunder (2004–2005); Baltimore Ravens (2005)*; Arizona Cardinals (2005–2006)
- * Offseason or practice squad member only

Awards and highlights
- World Bowl champion (XII); All-NFL Europe (2005); SEC All-Freshman Team (1999)

Career NFL statistics
- Games played: 2
- Stats at Pro Football Reference

Dante Davine Ellington (born February 29, 1980) is an American former professional football tackle who played in the National Football League (NFL) for the Arizona Cardinals. He played college football for the Alabama Crimson Tide. Ellington also had stints in the NFL with the Philadelphia Eagles and Baltimore Ravens and NFL Europe with the Berlin Thunder.

== Early life ==
Ellington was born on February 29, 1980, in Rochester, New York. He attended Colbert County High School in Leighton, where he played football, basketball and track. On January 18, 1999, Ellington committed to play college football at University of Alabama. He was a Super Prep and Parade All-American.

== College career ==
Ellington played college football for the Alabama Crimson Tide from 1999 to 2002. He played at both left and right tackle during his career. Ellington was ruled academically ineligible for the 2002 season.

== Professional career ==
=== Philadelphia Eagles ===
After going undrafted in the 2003 NFL draft, Ellington signed with the Philadelphia Eagles as an undrafted free agent. On September 1, he was released. On December 22, Ellington was signed to the practice squad. On January 26, 2004, he signed a futures contract with the team. On September 5, Ellington was released.

=== Berlin Thunder ===
On February 8, 2004, Ellington was allocated to the Berlin Thunder of NFL Europe. He started in ten games and won World Bowl XII. On February 14, 2005, Ellington was selected by the Thunder in 2005 NFL Europe free agent draft. He played in ten games and had one reception for ten yards. Ellington was named to the 2005 All-NFL Europe team.

=== Baltimore Ravens ===
On June 15, 2005, Ellington was signed by the Baltimore Ravens. On September 3, he was released and signed to the practice squad. On September 13, Ellington was waived by the team.

=== Arizona Cardinals ===
On November 23, 2005, the Arizona Cardinals signed Ellington to the practice squad. On November 26, he was elevated to the active roster. Ellington played in two games before he was released on December 13. On December 15, he was re-signed to the practice squad. On January 2, 2006, Ellington signed a futures contract with the team. On August 1, he was released by the team.
