= J. J. Jones =

J. J. Jones or JJ Jones may refer to:

- J. J. Jones (linebacker) (born 1978), NFL linebacker
- J. J. Jones (quarterback) (1952–2009), New York Jets NFL quarterback
- J. J. Jones (wide receiver) (born 1992), NFL wide receiver
- JJ Jones (Skins), a fictional character in the British teen drama Skins

== See also ==
- List of people with surname Jones
