= Chris Demaree =

American football player (born 1980)

No. 93, 96, 9
- Position: Defensive tackle

Personal information
- Born: March 12, 1980 (age 46); Louisville, Kentucky, U.S.
- Listed height: 6 ft 2 in (1.88 m)
- Listed weight: 315 lb (143 kg)

Career information
- High school: Male (Louisville)
- College: Kentucky (1998–2001)
- NFL draft: 2002: undrafted

Career history
- San Diego Chargers (2002); Chicago Bears (2002–2003)*; Carolina Panthers (2003)*; San Francisco 49ers (2004)*; → Rhein Fire (2004); Georgia Force (2005–2006); Kansas City Brigade (2007–2008)
- * Offseason or practice squad member only
- Stats at Pro Football Reference
- Stats at ArenaFan.com

Christopher John Demaree (born March 12, 1980) is an American former professional football player who was a defensive tackle for one season with the San Diego Chargers of the National Football League (NFL). He played college football for the Kentucky Wildcats. He was also a member of the Chicago Bears, Carolina Panthers, and San Francisco 49ers of the NFL, the Rhein Fire of NFL Europe, and the Georgia Force and Kansas City Brigade of the Arena Football League (AFL).

== Early life and college ==
Christopher John Demaree was born on March 12, 1980, in Louisville, Kentucky. He attended Louisville Male High School.

He was a four-year letterman for the Kentucky Wildcats of the University of Kentucky from 1998 to 2001.

== Professional career ==
After going undrafted in the 2002 NFL draft, Demaree signed with the San Diego Chargers on April 26. He played in two games for the Chargers during the 2002 season before being waived on November 19, 2002.

Demaree was signed to the practice squad of the Chicago Bears on November 26, 2002. He signed a reserve/future contract with the Bears on December 31, 2002. He was waived on August 31, 2003, and signed to the team's practice squad on September 2. He was released on September 13, signed to the practice squad on October 2, and released for the final time on November 4, 2003.

Demaree was signed to the Carolina Panthers' practice squad on December 24, 2003. He became a free agent after the season.

Demaree signed with the San Francisco 49ers on February 10, 2004. He was allocated to NFL Europe in 2004 to play for the Rhein Fire. He appeared in all ten games, starting two, for the Fire during the 2004 NFL Europe season, recording 20 defensive tackles, three sacks, and one forced fumble. He was waived by the 49ers on September 6, 2004.

Demaree signed with the Georgia Force of the Arena Football League (AFL) on January 4, 2005. He spent part of the year on injured reserve and was activated on April 13, 2005. Overall, he played in eight games for the Force during the 2005 season, totaling three carries for 11 yards and one touchdown, one catch for three yards, two solo tackles, one assisted tackle, one sack, one forced fumble, and one fumble recovery. Demaree was a fullback/linebacker during his time in the AFL. He played both offense and defense as the league played under ironman rules. He re-signed with the Force on October 24, 2005. He appeared in all 16 games during the 2006 season, accumulating 23 solo tackles, 6 assisted tackles, four sacks, one forced fumble, one fumble recovery, and pass breakup. The Force finished the year with an 8–8 record and beat the New York Dragons in the Wildcard round of the playoffs before losing to the Dallas Desperados in the divisional round.

Demaree was signed by the Kansas City Brigade of the AFL on October 18, 2006. He was placed on injured reserve on March 8, 2007. He was activated on May 4 before being placed on injured reserve again on May 11, 2007. Overall, he played in two games for the Brigade during the 2007 season, recording one solo tackle, one assisted tackle, one sack, one forced fumble, and two fumble recoveries. During his final AFL season in 2008, Demaree totaled 18 solo tackles, 19 assisted tackles, 3.5 sacks, one forced fumble, one pass breakup, and one interception that he returned 42 yards for a touchdown. The Brigade finished the season with a 3–13 record.
