= Maurice Hicks =

American football player (born 1978)

No. 43
- Position: Running back

Personal information
- Born: July 22, 1978 (age 48); Emporia, Virginia, U.S.
- Listed height: 5 ft 11 in (1.80 m)
- Listed weight: 205 lb (93 kg)

Career information
- College: North Carolina A&T
- NFL draft: 2002: undrafted

Career history
- Chicago Bears (2002); Scottish Claymores (2003–2004); San Francisco 49ers (2003–2007); Minnesota Vikings (2008); Florida Tuskers (2010)

Career NFL statistics
- Rushing attempts: 205
- Rushing yards: 869
- Rushing touchdowns: 6
- Receptions: 55
- Receiving yards: 424
- Receiving touchdowns: 1
- Stats at Pro Football Reference

Maurice Hicks (born July 22, 1978) is an American former professional football player who was a running back in the National Football League (NFL). He was signed by the Chicago Bears as an undrafted free agent in 2002. He played college football for the North Carolina A&T Aggies.

Hicks has also played for the San Francisco 49ers, Scottish Claymores and Minnesota Vikings.

== Early life ==
While attending Greensville County High School in Emporia, Virginia Hicks was a standout in football as a tailback and safety.

== College career ==
While attending North Carolina A&T State University, Hicks finished his career with a school-record 2,812 rushing yards. As a senior, he was a third-team Division I-AA All-American selection, the Black College Offensive Player of the Year, a first-team All-MEAC selection, and he led the MEAC in rushing yards with 1,325 rushing yards. During his senior season, in a game against Morgan State University, he broke the NCAA Division I and II single game rushing records by rushing for 437 rushing yards. As a junior, he was a first-team All-MEAC selection, after rushing for 1,487 yards.

== Professional career ==
=== Chicago Bears ===
He was signed as an undrafted free agent by the Chicago Bears in the 2002 NFL draft.

=== San Francisco 49ers ===
Hicks was signed as a free agent by the San Francisco 49ers in 2003. While with the 49ers he was the second string running back behind Kevan Barlow.

=== Minnesota Vikings ===
On March 4, 2008, he signed a three-year deal with the Minnesota Vikings.

Hicks was released by the Vikings, on February 18, 2009.
