= Ron Smith (defensive tackle) =

American football player (born 1978)

No. 57
- Position: Defensive tackle

Personal information
- Born: August 19, 1978 (age 48); St. Louis, Missouri, U.S.
- Listed height: 6 ft 3 in (1.91 m)
- Listed weight: 308 lb (140 kg)

Career information
- High school: Gateway Tech
- College: Lane
- NFL draft: 2001: undrafted

Career history
- Carolina Panthers (2001)*; Seattle Seahawks (2002)*; Cincinnati Bengals (2002); Seattle Seahawks (2004)*; Cologne Centurions (2004)*; Seattle Seahawks (2005)
- * Offseason or practice squad member only
- Stats at Pro Football Reference

Ronald Smith (born August 18, 1978) is an American former football defensive tackle who played for the Cincinnati Bengals in 2002. He played college football at Lane University.
