= Erik Totten =

American football player (born 1980)

No. 39, 29
- Position: Safety

Personal information
- Born: January 21, 1980 (age 46); Renton, Washington, U.S.
- Listed height: 5 ft 9 in (1.75 m)
- Listed weight: 194 lb (88 kg)

Career information
- High school: Tahoma (Maple Valley, Washington)
- College: Western Washington (1998–2001)
- NFL draft: 2002: undrafted

Career history
- Pittsburgh Steelers (2002); Cologne Centurions (2004); San Francisco 49ers (2004)*
- * Offseason or practice squad member only
- Stats at Pro Football Reference

Erik Terry Totten (born January 21, 1980) is an American former professional football safety who played for the Pittsburgh Steelers of the National Football League (NFL). He played college football for the Western Washington Vikings.

== Early life ==
Erik Terry Totten was born on January 21, 1980, in Renton, Washington. He attended Tahoma High School in Maple Valley, Washington.

== College career ==
Totten played college football for the Western Washington Vikings of Western Washington University from 1998 to 2001 as a safety and kick returner. He became a starter early during his true freshman year in 1998. He started every game in 2000 and 2001. During the 2000 season, Totten was named a first-team All-American as a punt returner by the American Football Coaches Association and a first-team All-American as a defensive back from d2football.com. He also earned first-team Academic All-American honors and the school's Male Athlete of the Year.

Totten led the team in tackles with 69 in 2001 while also posting three interceptions. He garnered Associated Press second-team Little All-American recognition. He set Western Washington's career records for kick returns (60), kick return yards (1,347), punt returns (104), and punt return yards (1,242).

== Professional career ==
After going undrafted in the 2002 NFL draft, Totten signed with the Pittsburgh Steelers on April 26, 2002. At 5'9" and 194 pounds, he was considered a small player. Steelers secondary coach Willy Robinson said "He's not the biggest or the fastest guy for the position in the league" but "he loves to strike people, he has a great work ethic and he's serious about the game." Totten was waived on September 1, signed to the practice squad on September 3, released on October 22, signed to the practice squad again on November 5, and promoted to the active roster on November 21. He played in his only career regular season game on November 24 in a 29–21 victory over the Cincinnati Bengals. Totten incurred a ten-yard penalty for offensive holding on a punt return. He was waived on November 28 and signed to the practice squad for the third time on November 30, 2002. On January 6, 2003, Totten was promoted to the active roster for the divisional round playoff game against the Tennessee Titans on January 11, 2003. However, he did not end up playing in the game. He was waived by the Steelers on August 30, 2003.

On February 8, 2004, Totten was selected by the Cologne Centurions in the 2004 NFL Europe draft. He played in four games, starting two, for the Centurions during the 2004 NFL Europe season, posting 12 tackles on defense and two pass breakups.

Totten signed with the San Francisco 49ers on June 16, 2004. He was waived on September 5, 2004, before the start of the 2004 regular season.

== Personal life ==
Totten has worked in finance since his NFL career.
