= Ryan Van Dyke =

American football player (born 1980)

Profile
- Position: Quarterback

Personal information
- Born: February 13, 1980 (age 46)
- Listed height: 6 ft 5 in (1.96 m)
- Listed weight: 230 lb (104 kg)

Career information
- High school: Marshall (Marshall, Michigan)
- College: Michigan State
- NFL draft: 2002: undrafted

Career history
- Seattle Seahawks (2002)*; New York Giants (2003–2004)*; Cologne Centurions (2004); Los Angeles Avengers (2005–2006); Grand Rapids Rampage (2006)
- * Offseason or practice squad member only

Career AFL statistics
- Comp. / Att.: 48 / 85
- Passing yards: 441
- TD–INT: 7–5
- Passer rating: 66.84
- Stats at ArenaFan.com

Ryan Van Dyke (born February 13, 1980) is an American former professional football quarterback who played two seasons in the Arena Football League (AFL) with the Los Angeles Avengers and Grand Rapids Rampage. He played college football at Michigan State University. He was also a member of the Seattle Seahawks, New York Giants and Cologne Centurions.

== Early life ==
Van Dyke played high school football at Marshall High School in Marshall, Michigan. He earned first-team all-state honors, completed 118 of 182 pass attempts for 1,996 yards and 25 touchdowns as a senior. He helped the then-Redskins to a 12-1 record in 1997 and a second-place finish in the state playoffs. Van Dyke added 300 yards rushing and scored seven touchdowns in 1997.

== College career ==
Van Dyke played for the Michigan State Spartans from 1998 to 2001. He recorded fourteen touchdowns on 2,111 passing yards for the Spartans.

== Professional career ==
Van Dyke signed with the Seattle Seahawks of the National Football League (NFL) on April 22, 2002 after going undrafted in the 2002 NFL draft. He was released by the Seahawks on August 26, 2002. He signed with the NFL's New York Giants on January 7, 2003. Van Dyke was released by the Giants on August 25, 2003. He was signed by the Giants on January 13, 2004 and allocated to NFL Europe to play for the Cologne Centurions. He was released by the Giants on September 5, 2004. Van Dyke signed with the Los Angeles Avengers of the AFL on November 1, 2004. He was released by the Avengers on February 14, 2006. On February 28, 2006, he was signed to the practice squad of the Grand Rapids Rampage of the AFL. Van Dyke was promoted to the active roster on March 8, 2006.
