= Mike Barr (American football) =

American football player (born 1978)

No. 5
- Position: Punter

Personal information
- Born: December 8, 1978 (age 47); Lynchburg, Virginia, U.S.
- Listed height: 6 ft 3 in (1.91 m)
- Listed weight: 230 lb (104 kg)

Career information
- College: Rutgers
- NFL draft: 2003: undrafted

Career history
- Washington Redskins (2003)*; New York Jets (2003)*; Pittsburgh Steelers (2004–2007)*; Frankfurt Galaxy (2004–2007); Arizona Cardinals (2007)
- * Offseason or practice squad member only
- Stats at Pro Football Reference

Mike Barr (born December 8, 1978) is an American former professional football punter.

He attended Rutgers University, where he finished as one of the best Rutgers punters in school history. Since then, he has had experience in both the Washington Redskins and New York Jets training camps in 2003 and has been playing with the Frankfurt Galaxy of NFL Europa. He was signed by the Pittsburgh Steelers every year between 2004 and 2007, but was released and allocated to the Galaxy each year.

After being once again re-signed by the Steelers in late January 2007, he battled Daniel Sepulveda for the starting position which became open with the release of Chris Gardocki on May 23, 2007. He was cut by the Steelers during training camp in 2007, but claimed off waivers by the Arizona Cardinals, who released their punter Scott Player on August 29, 2007. He was later cut on November 27, 2007, for a dismal 2007 season, finishing last in the NFL in punt averages.
