= Walter Williams (running back) =

American football player (born 1977)

No. 32, 29
- Position: Running back

Personal information
- Born: September 8, 1977 (age 49); Baton Rouge, Louisiana, U.S.
- Listed height: 6 ft 1 in (1.85 m)
- Listed weight: 206 lb (93 kg)

Career information
- High school: Brusly (Brusly, Louisiana)
- College: Grambling State
- NFL draft: 2001: undrafted

Career history
- New England Patriots (2001); New Orleans Saints (2003)*; Rhein Fire (2004); Green Bay Packers (2004–2005); Oakland Raiders (2006)*
- * Offseason or practice squad member only

Awards and highlights
- Super Bowl champion (XXXVI)
- Stats at Pro Football Reference

Walter Charles Williams (born September 8, 1977) is an American former professional football player who was a running back for two seasons with the Green Bay Packers of the National Football League (NFL). He played college football for the Grambling State Tigers. Williams was also a member of the New England Patriots, New Orleans Saints, Oakland Raiders and played for the Rhein Fire of NFL Europe. He was a member of the Patriots team that won Super Bowl XXXVI.

== Early life ==
Williams attended Brusly High School in Brusly, Louisiana.

== Professional career ==
=== New England Patriots ===
Williams was signed by the New England Patriots on April 27, 2001. He was placed on injured reserve on September 2, 2001. Williams was released by the Patriots on August 14, 2002. He told the team he was considering retirement.

=== New Orleans Saints ===
Williams was signed by the New Orleans Saints and later released on August 25, 2003.

=== Green Bay Packers ===
Williams was signed by the Green Bay Packers on January 19, 2004.

=== Rhein Fire ===
Williams was allocated to NFL Europe by the Green Bay Packers in 2004, where he played for the Rhein Fire.

=== Green Bay Packers ===
Williams was released by the Packers on September 4, 2004, and re-signed to the team's practice squad on September 15, 2004. He was promoted to the active roster on November 20, 2004. He was released by the Packers on September 3, 2005, after battling an injury. He was re-signed by the Packers on October 25, 2005.

Williams was released on December 22, 2005, after being on injured reserve.

=== Oakland Raiders ===
Williams was signed to a one-year contract by the Oakland Raiders on May 9, 2006. He was released by the Raiders on July 24, 2006.
