= Kevin Breedlove =

American football player (born 1980)

No. 67, 70
- Position: Offensive lineman

Personal information
- Born: June 25, 1980 (age 46); Arlington, Texas, U.S.
- Listed height: 6 ft 3 in (1.91 m)
- Listed weight: 315 lb (143 kg)

Career information
- High school: D. W. Daniel (Central, South Carolina)
- College: Georgia (1999–2002)
- NFL draft: 2003: undrafted

Career history
- San Diego Chargers (2003); Tampa Bay Buccaneers (2003)*; → Rhein Fire (2004); Winnipeg Blue Bombers (2005)*
- * Offseason or practice squad member only
- Stats at Pro Football Reference

Kevin J. Breedlove (born June 25, 1980) is an American former professional football player who was an offensive lineman for one season with the San Diego Chargers of the National Football League (NFL). He played college football for the Georgia Bulldogs.

== Early life and college ==
Kevin J. Breedlove was born on June 25, 1980, in Arlington, Texas. He attended D. W. Daniel High School in Central, South Carolina.

Breedlove was a four-year letterman for the Georgia Bulldogs of the University of Georgia from 1999 to 2002.

== Professional career ==
After going unselected in the 2003 NFL draft, Breedlove signed with the San Diego Chargers on May 2, 2003. He was released on August 31 and re-signed on September 25. He did not play in the team's Week 4 game against the Oakland Raiders on September 28. Breedlove was released the next day and signed to the Chargers' practice squad on October 1. He was promoted to the active roster on October 4 and made his NFL debut in Week 5 against the Jacksonville Jaguars. He was released again on October 14, signed to the practice squad again on October 16, and released for the final time on October 21, 2003.

Breedlove was signed to the practice squad of the Tampa Bay Buccaneers on December 22, 2003. He signed a reserve/future contract with the Buccaneers on December 29, 2003. He was allocated to NFL Europe in 2004 to play for the Rhein Fire. He played in all ten games for the Fire during the 2004 NFL Europe season and recorded one tackle. Breedlove was placed on the reserve/non-football injury list on September 5, 2004. He was released by the Buccaneers on February 22, 2005.

On May 10, 2005, Breedlove signed with the Winnipeg Blue Bombers of the Canadian Football League. He was released on June 8, 2005. He reportedly had not fully recovered from a 2004 shoulder surgery.

== Post-football career ==
Breedlove graduated from Clemson University with a master's degree in business and marketing. He lost 100 pounds after his football career. In 2010, he opened Odyssey Health Center in Hilton Head, South Carolina.
