= Chas Gessner =

American football player (born 1981)

No. 83, 19
- Position: Wide receiver

Personal information
- Born: August 17, 1981 (age 45); Washington, D.C., U.S.
- Listed height: 6 ft 5 in (1.96 m)
- Listed weight: 215 lb (98 kg)

Career information
- High school: Our Lady of Good Counsel (Olney, Maryland)
- College: Brown
- NFL draft: 2003: undrafted

Career history
- New England Patriots (2003); Berlin Thunder (2004); New York Jets (2004–2005)*; Tampa Bay Buccaneers (2006)*; Orlando Predators (2007)*; Tampa Bay Buccaneers (2007); Seattle Seahawks (2008)*; Orlando Predators (2008); Florida Tuskers (2009–2010); Spokane Shock (2011); Virginia Destroyers (2011)
- * Offseason or practice squad member only

Awards and highlights
- Super Bowl champion (XXXVIII); World Bowl champion (XII); All-NFL Europe (2004); 2× All-American (2001, 2002)
- Stats at Pro Football Reference
- Stats at ArenaFan.com

Chas Gessner (born August 17, 1981) is an American former professional football player who was a wide receiver in the National Football League (NFL). He was signed by the New England Patriots as an undrafted free agent in 2003 to begin his NFL career and earned a Super Bowl ring in his first year as a member of their practice squad. He played college football and college lacrosse for the Brown Bears. He was an All-American in both sports.

Gessner was also a member of the New York Jets, Tampa Bay Buccaneers, Seattle Seahawks, the Berlin Thunder of NFL Europe, Orlando Predators of the Arena League, and the Florida Tuskers of the UFL.

Gessner is currently the founder and CEO of Vitality Rx which is a Men's health subscription wellness platform targeting the root causes of age-related symptoms through a hybrid of telemedicine and concierge diagnostics.

== Early life ==
Gessner attended Our Lady of the Good Counsel High School in Wheaton, Maryland and was a letterman in football, basketball, and lacrosse. In football, he won All-County and All-Conference honors. In lacrosse, he was a team captain and won All-America honors.

== College career ==
Gessner was an All-American in Football at the Ivy League's Brown University. He also earned All-American honors on Brown's lacrosse team, making him a rare two-sport All-American at Brown.

Brown University senior All-American Gessner, who led the nation in receiving, placed sixth in the voting for the Walter Payton Award, presented annually to the nation's top I-AA player. Gessner's sixth-place finish was the highest finish ever for a Brown football player.

A two-time Payton Award finalist, Gessner led the nation with 11.4 receptions per game, completing the 2002 season with 114 receptions, third best in NCAA I-AA history.

Gessner tied an NCAA I-AA record with 24 receptions against Rhode Island, a record held by legendary NFL wide receiver Jerry Rice, who caught 24 passes for Mississippi Valley State against Southern University in 1983. Gessner made 14 catches in the first half alone against the Rams. He hauled in 24 passes for 207 yards and two touchdowns (12 yards, 14 yards), and was named the National I-AA Offensive Player of the Week by The Sports Network, the Ivy League Offensive Player of the Week, and the New England Football Writers Gold Helmet Award Winner.

His average of 11.4 receptions per game is also third in I-AA history. Gessner's 292 career receptions are 4th in NCAA I-AA history, and second in the Ivy League record book, while his 36 career touchdown receptions are second best in Ivy football history and 10th in NCAA I-AA history. Gessner completed his career with 3,408 all-time receiving yards, 18th best in I-AA history.

== Professional career ==
=== New England Patriots ===
Gessner earned a Super Bowl ring as a member of the New England Patriots in 2003. He was allocated by the New England Patriots to the Berlin Thunder of NFL Europe, helped them win the World Bowl in 2004 and was named to the All-NFL Europe team.

=== New York Jets ===
Subsequently, he joined the New York Jets in 2005.

=== Tampa Bay Buccaneers ===
Gessner saw his first significant playing time in a regular season NFL game against the Arizona Cardinals in 2007.

=== Orlando Predators ===
Gessner joined the Arena Football League in 2008 with the Orlando Predators where he was honored as the March Rookie of the Month and posted 76 receptions for 801 yards and 20 touchdowns in the first 11 weeks of the season.

=== Seattle Seahawks ===
Gessner was signed by the Seattle Seahawks to a two-year contract in May 2008.

=== Professional Lacrosse ===
Gessner was selected 2nd overall by the Baltimore Bayhawks in the MLL 2008 draft in December 2008.

=== Second stint with Predators ===
Gessner later re-joined the Orlando Predators and played in their playoff game against the Cleveland Gladiators where he scored 3 touchdowns in the 69–66 loss to the Gladiators.

=== Florida Tuskers ===
Gessner was drafted by the Florida Tuskers on the UFL Premiere Season Draft in 2009 and signed with the team on August 17. He was placed on injured reserve on October 25. He has since founded VitalityRX.
