= Ryan Myers =

American football player (born 1980)

No. 59, 58, 52
- Position: Linebacker

Personal information
- Born: February 27, 1980 (age 46); Oberlin, Ohio, U.S.
- Listed height: 6 ft 2 in (1.88 m)
- Listed weight: 245 lb (111 kg)

Career information
- High school: Wellington (Wellington, Ohio)
- College: Akron
- NFL draft: 2003: undrafted

Career history
- New York Jets (2004–2006); → Scottish Claymores (2004)
- Stats at Pro Football Reference

Ryan James Myers (born February 27, 1980) is an American former professional football linebacker who played for the New York Jets of the National Football League (NFL). He played college football for the Ashland Eagles and Akron Zips.

== Early life ==
Ryan James Myers was born on February 27, 1980, in Oberlin, Ohio. He attended Wellington High School in Wellington, Ohio.

== College career ==
Myers began his college football career at Ashland University in 1998. In 1999, he transferred to Akron University but had to sit out the season. He was then a three-year letterman for the Zips from 2000 to 2002. Myers posted 80 tackles during the 2002 season.

== Professional career ==
After going undrafted during the 2003 NFL draft, Myers attended rookie minicamp on a tryout basis with the Cleveland Browns. He signed a reserve/future contract with the New York Jets on January 6, 2004. The Jets allocated Myers to NFL Europe to play for the Scottish Claymores. He started all ten games for the Claymores during the 2004 NFL Europe season, setting a franchise-record with 73 tackles while earning team co-MVP honors. He was waived by the Jets on September 4, 2004, before the start of the NFL regular season.

Myers signed a reserve/future contract with the Jets on January 11, 2005. After being inactive for the first game of the 2007 regular season, he played in the remaining 15 games. He finished the season with eight solo tackles and four assisted tackles. Myers appeared in three games in 2006, and made one assisted tackles, before being waived on September 26, 2006.

== Personal life ==
Myers became a financial advisor after his NFL career.
