= Rick Lantz =

American football coach (1938–2023)

Biographical details
- Born: January 4, 1938; New Britain, Connecticut, U.S.
- Died: March 25, 2023 (aged 85); Charlottesville, Virginia, U.S.

Coaching career (HC unless noted)
- 1964: Bridgton Academy (ME)
- 1965–1967: Boston University (assistant)
- 1968–1970: Buffalo (DC)
- 1971–1976: Navy (assistant)
- 1977–1980: Miami (FL) (DC)
- 1981: New England Patriots (LB)
- 1982–1983: Georgia Tech (DC)
- 1984–1985: Notre Dame (DL)
- 1986–1990: Louisville (DC/LB)
- 1991–2000: Virginia (DC)
- 2001: Navy (DC/LB)
- 2001: Navy (interim HC)
- 2003: Barcelona Dragons (LB)
- 2004–2006: Berlin Thunder
- 2007: Rhein Fire
- 2010: Omaha Nighthawks (DC/LB)

Head coaching record
- Overall: 0–3 (college); 23–11–1 (NFL Europe)

Accomplishments and honors

Championships
- World Bowl (XII)

Awards
- NFL Europe Coach of the Year (2004)

Richard Lantz (January 4, 1938 – March 26, 2023) was an American football coach. He served as the interim head football coach at the United States Naval Academy for three games in 2001, following the firing of Charlie Weatherbie. He was formerly a widely recognized defensive coordinator in the college football ranks and held high-profile jobs at the University of Virginia and the University of Louisville. He also served as an assistant coach at the Georgia Institute of Technology, the University of Miami, the University at Buffalo, and Boston University.

Lantz also coached the Berlin Thunder and Rhein Fire of NFL Europe. In three seasons (2004–2006) with the Berlin Thunder, Lantz coached the team to an 18–11–1 regular season record. In addition, the Thunder competed in two World Bowls. Berlin won World Bowl XII, 30–24, over the Frankfurt Galaxy on June 12, 2004, in Gelsenkirchen, Germany. The following year, the Thunder fell in World Bowl XIII, 27–21, to the Amsterdam Admirals on June 11, 2005, in Düsseldorf, Germany. The 2006 Berlin season included a 17–17 tie on the road against the Hamburg Sea Devils on April 1, one of just two ties in the history of NFL Europe. Lantz took the reins of the Rhein Fire in 2007, the final season of NFL Europe. He coached the team to a 4–6 record.

Lantz died on March 26, 2023, at the age of 85.

== Head coaching record ==
=== College ===
Year	Team	Overall	Conference	Standing	Bowl/playoffs
Navy Midshipmen (NCAA Division I-A independent) (2001)
2001	Navy	0–3			
Navy:		0–3			
Total:		0–3			
