= Lance Nimmo =

American football player (born 1979)

No. 65, 73, 77
- Position: Offensive tackle

Personal information
- Born: September 13, 1979 (age 47); New Castle, Pennsylvania, U.S.
- Listed height: 6 ft 6 in (1.98 m)
- Listed weight: 330 lb (150 kg)

Career information
- College: West Virginia
- NFL draft: 2003: 4th round, 130th overall pick

Career history
- Tampa Bay Buccaneers (2003)*; New York Jets (2003); Cologne Centurions (2004); Cleveland Browns (2004)*; New England Patriots (2004–2005)*; Tampa Bay Buccaneers (2005)*
- * Offseason or practice squad member only

Awards and highlights
- Super Bowl champion (2004)

Lance Nimmo (born September 13, 1979) is an American former football offensive tackle in the National Football League (NFL).

== Early life and college ==
A native of New Castle, Pennsylvania, Nimmo played high school football at Laurel JSHS, just outside New Castle, played college football at West Virginia, and competed in 44 games. He was a two-year starter at left tackle and earned first-team all-conference as a senior as part of an offensive line that yielded only one sack all season. Nimmo was also Academic All-Big East for all four years. He was represented by agent Joe Lenta. In addition to football, Nimmo competed in pedal tractor pulls growing up, which his father, Bob Nimmo, credited as helping his conditioning.

== Professional career ==
Nimmo was selected 130th overall by the Tampa Bay Buccaneers in the fourth round of the 2003 NFL draft. Nimmo went to Japan as part of a preseason game for the Buccaneers but was waived after training camp. He spent the 2003 season on the active roster of the New York Jets, though he never played in a game. He spent the spring of 2004 in NFL Europe, starting 10 games for the Cologne Centurions. Nimmo was signed to the New England Patriots for the 2004–2005 season. Despite remaining on the practice squad, he earned a Super Bowl ring after the Patriots won Super Bowl XXXIX. Nimmo has no official NFL statistics, having only one season as an active, competitive player (with no game time), and having only worked on practice squads in other years.

== Personal life ==
As of January 2020, Nimmo is a math teacher at Sharpsville Area Middle School, in Sharpsville, Pennsylvania. He is a member of the Laurel School Board.
