= Steve Smith (defensive back) =

American football player (born 2000)

No. 21, 22
- Positions: Cornerback, safety

Personal information
- Born: June 28, 1979 (age 47); Torrance, California, U.S.
- Listed height: 6 ft 1 in (1.85 m)
- Listed weight: 193 lb (88 kg)

Career information
- High school: San Pedro (San Pedro, California)
- College: Oregon
- NFL draft: 2002: 7th round, 246th overall pick

Career history
- Jacksonville Jaguars (2002); New Orleans Saints (2003)*; Tennessee Titans (2003–2004)*; → Cologne Centurions (2004)
- * Offseason or practice squad member only

Awards and highlights
- Tostitos Fiesta Bowl Defensive Player of the Game (2002)
- Stats at Pro Football Reference

Steven Michael Smith (born June 28, 1979) is an American former professional football player who was a cornerback for the Jacksonville Jaguars of the National Football League (NFL). He played college football for the Oregon Ducks. He was selected by the Jacksonville Jaguars with the 35th pick of the seventh round (246th overall) of the 2002 NFL draft.

He was also a member of the New Orleans Saints and Tennessee Titans of the NFL and the Cologne Centurions of NFL Europe.

== College career ==
Smith attended the University of Oregon from 1998 to 2001. In his senior season, he led the Ducks with nine interceptions, including three in the 2002 Tostitos Fiesta Bowl, which earned him Defensive Player of the Game honors. As of 2014, he ranks 2nd all-time for pass break-ups in Oregon Ducks' history.

== Professional career ==
=== Pre-draft ===
He entered the draft process for the 2002 NFL draft, receiving an invite to that year's combine.

Pre-draft measurables
Height	Weight	Arm length	Hand span	40-yard dash	10-yard split	20-yard split	20-yard shuttle	Three-cone drill	Vertical jump	Broad jump
6 ft 0 5/8 in (1.84 m)	193 lb (88 kg)	31 1/2 in (0.80 m)	9 1/4 in (0.23 m)	4.55 s	1.55 s	2.62 s	4.22 s	7.00 s	30.5 in (0.77 m)	9 ft 2 in (2.79 m)
All values from NFL Combine

=== Jacksonville Jaguars ===
He was selected by the Jacksonville Jaguars with the 35th pick of the seventh round (246th overall) of the 2002 NFL draft. He was waived on September 1, 2002, and assigned to the practice squad on September 3. He was subsequently released on December 4, 2002, and signed to the active roster. He was re-signed again on March 26, 2003. He was waived on May 19, 2003.

=== New Orleans Saints ===
Ten days later, on May 29, 2003, the New Orleans Saints signed Smith to their roster. They waived him on July 31, later that year.

=== Tennessee Titans ===
The Tennessee Titans then signed Smith on August 12, 2003. They later waived him on August 29. They subsequently signed him to their practice squad on September 2, 2003. On January 27, 2004, he signed a reserve/futures contract with the Titans. He was allocated to NFL Europe, where he played for the Cologne Centurions during the 2004 NFL Europe season. Smith intercepted one pass for a seven-yard return while with the Centurions.

In the Titans fourth pre-season against the Green Bay Packers in 2004, Smith suffered a spine injury that would end his career.

== Personal life ==
After retiring from football, Smith moved back to Eugene, Oregon, where he worked for UPS.

In 2013, he and his wife, Jamie, started a restaurant in Stockton, California called Smitty's Wings & Things. It was featured on Diners, Drive-Ins and Dives in 2016.

They have three children, Alex, Deja, and DeAndre.
