= Richard Newsome =

American football player (born 1977)

No. 31, 21
- Position: Safety

Personal information
- Born: December 6, 1977 (age 48); Lima, Ohio, U.S.
- Listed height: 5 ft 11 in (1.80 m)
- Listed weight: 202 lb (92 kg)

Career information
- High school: Fostoria (Fostoria, Ohio)
- College: Michigan State (1997–2000)
- NFL draft: 2001: undrafted

Career history
- New Orleans Saints (2001); Cologne Centurions (2004)

Awards and highlights
- Second-team All-Big Ten (2000)
- Stats at Pro Football Reference

Richard Lawrence Newsome (born December 6, 1977) is an American former professional football safety who played for the New Orleans Saints of the National Football League (NFL). He played college football for the Michigan State Spartans.

== Early life ==
Richard Lawrence Newsome was born on December 6, 1977, in Lima, Ohio. He attended Fostoria High School in Fostoria, Ohio.

== College career ==
Newsome enrolled at Michigan State University to play college football for the Spartans. He was a four-year letterman from 1997 to 2000. He scored a punt return touchdown in 1998 and made two career interceptions. Newsome was named second-team All-Big Ten Conference by the coaches for his performance during the 2000 season.

== Professional career ==
After going undrafted in the 2001 NFL draft, Newsome signed with the New Orleans Saints on April 26, 2001. He played in 11 games, primarily on special teams, for the Saints during the 2001 season. He posted eight solo tackles, one assisted tackle, and one forced fumble. He was waived on September 1, 2002.

In 2004, Newsome was drafted by the Cologne Centurions of NFL Europe. He started all ten games for the Centurions during the 2004 NFL Europe season, recording 32 defensive tackles, five special teams tackles, one interception, and five pass breakups. The Centurions finished the year with a 4–6 record.
