= Henri Childs =

American gridiron football player (born 1980)

Profile
- Position: Running back

Personal information
- Born: January 15, 1980 (age 46); Shawnee, Kansas, U.S.

Career information
- College: Colorado State
- NFL draft: 2003

Career history
- 2003: Kansas City Chiefs
- 2004: Berlin Thunder
- 2006: Winnipeg Blue Bombers
- 2007: Montreal Alouettes
- 2007–2008: Saskatchewan Roughriders

Henri Childs (born January 15, 1980) is a former Canadian Football League player.

In high school, Childs was a Class 6A All-State selection in the fall of 1997 as a senior at Shawnee Mission West High School. He attended the University of Kansas on a football scholarship as a freshman and sophomore before transferring to Colorado State University as a junior, where he was switched to the wide receiver position. Childs was signed as a free agent by the Kansas City Chiefs in the summer of 2003, following his football career at Colorado State.

Childs was a running back for the Saskatchewan Roughriders in the Canadian Football League. Henri was a new addition to the Roughrider roster in 2007 gaining 143 yards in 38 attempts with 2 TD. Childs was first signed as a free agent for the NFL Kansas City Chiefs, spent time with the Berlin Thunder in NFL Europe. He was acquired by the Winnipeg Blue Bombers in 2006 and signed by the Montreal Alouettes in 2007. The Riders traded a 1st and 4th round 2008 Canadian College Draft pick along with OL Ryan Karhut to the Alouettes get Childs along with OL Brain Jones.
