= Jasen Esposito =

American football player (born 1981)

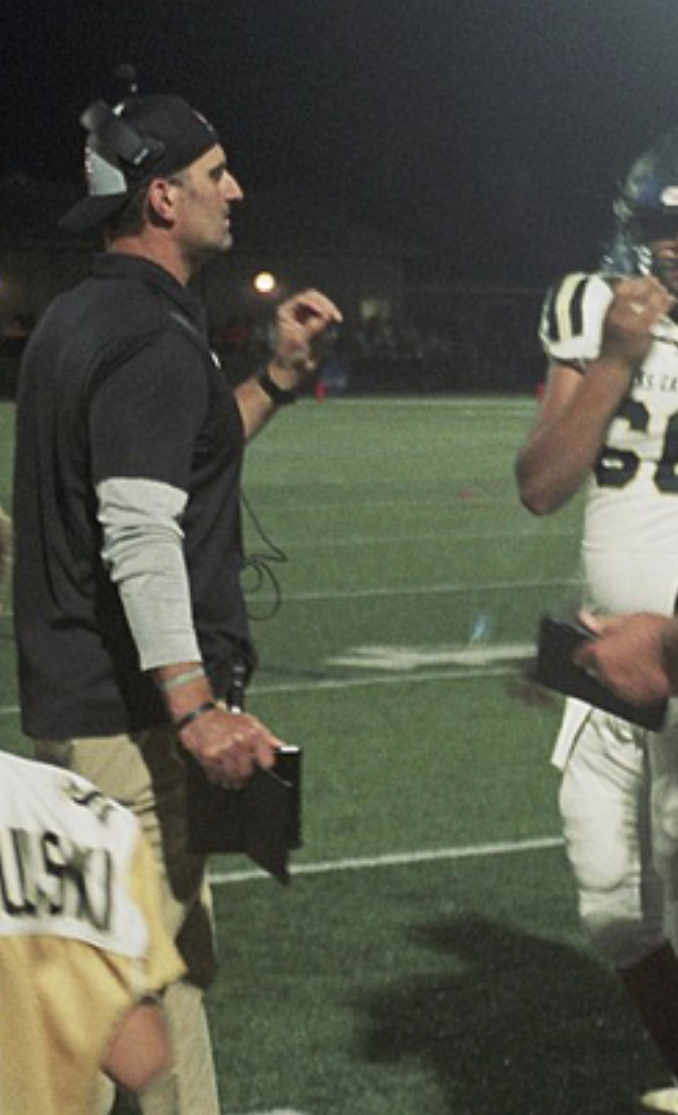

No. 60
- Position: Offensive tackle / Offensive guard

Personal information
- Born: June 14, 1981 (age 45); Reading, Pennsylvania
- Listed height: 6 ft 4 in (1.93 m)
- Listed weight: 305 lb (138 kg)

Career information
- High school: Holy Name High School
- College: Kutztown
- NFL draft: 2003: undrafted

Career history
- New England Patriots (2003)*; Buffalo Bills (2004–2005)*; Frankfurt Galaxy (NFL Europe) (2004)
- * Offseason or practice squad member only

Awards and highlights
- First-team All-PSAC (2002); 2× All-Berks (1997, 1998)

Richard Jasen Esposito (born June 14, 1981) is a former American football offensive lineman who played in NFL Europe with the Frankfurt Galaxy and was signed with the New England Patriots and Buffalo Bills as a member of the practice squad and played in the NFL preseason. He played college football at Kutztown University from 1999 to 2002 where he earned All-PSAC honors. Afterwards he was signed to the practice squads of the 2003 New England Patriots, and Buffalo Bills in 2004 and 2005. In between his time on the Bills' practice squad, he played for the Frankfurt Galaxy of NFL Europe in 2004 with whom he appeared in World Bowl XII. Between the Bills and the Patriots, Esposito was on the roster for seven NFL preseason games in between 2003 and 2005.

== Early life and education ==
Esposito was born in Reading, Pennsylvania, and attended Holy Name High School, where he played both offensive and defensive line. Esposito was profiled in the Reading Eagle/Reading Times during his senior season at Holy Name High School, where he was noted for his versatility on the offensive line and leadership qualities. He would later go on to coach at his alma mater. He was a two-time All-Berks selection, earning honors at both guard and defensive end in 1997 and 1998.

== College career ==
After Holy Name, Esposito matriculated to Kutztown University where he earned a bachelor's degree in finance. He was a three-year starter from 1999 to 2002 on the Kutztown Golden Bears Football Division II program in the NCAA. He primarily played left offensive tackle but also played guard his freshman year. For his final three seasons, Esposito played 32 games straight for the Golden Bears. During his senior year in 2002, Esposito won all PSAC first team honors. Kutztown University has placed Esposito on the 2000s all-decade team.

== Professional career ==
=== New England Patriots ===
On May 2, 2003, Jasen Esposito was signed to the New England Patriots as an undrafted free agent. He was waived on August 19, 2003, before the regular season commenced.

=== Buffalo Bills & NFL Europe ===
On January 29, 2004, Esposito was signed by the Buffalo Bills and allocated to NFL Europe, where he played for the Frankfurt Galaxy. During this transition from getting cut from the Patriots and signed to the Bills, Esposito was profiled by the Reading Eagle about his attempts at making it in the NFL and his career trajectory. On the 2004 Frankfurt Galaxy team, he is listed as playing guard and center. During his time on the Frankfurt Galaxy, he appeared in World Bowl XII. He returned to the Bills' practice squad for the 2004 and 2005 seasons. Though he never appeared in a regular season NFL game, Esposito spent three years in professional football organizations. Esposito's final professional football appearance occurred on September 2, 2005, in an NFL preseason game in Buffalo against the Detroit Lions.

== Personal life ==
In 2005, Esposito was contacted by Scott Swift, the father of pop star Taylor Swift to be her body guard. This occurred after a fan had hugged her at an event and this raised concerns for the need of security. Esposito was Taylor Swift’s first bodyguard. In 2026 Esposito went on Ross Tucker’s podcast to discuss this and received media coverage related to it.

In 2008, Esposito signed with the All American Football League which cancelled its 2008 season one month before kickoff. Esposito married Susan Pollack in 2012. He is vice president of GoBigRecruiting, a recruiting agency for high school athletes. Since 2008, Esposito has been an assistant coach at Holy Name High School, which merged into Berks Catholic High School in 2012. He continued coaching at Berks Catholic following the merger. Esposito was inducted into the Berks County Football Coaches Association Hall of Fame in 2022.
