= Eric McCoo =

American football player (born 1980)

No. 25, 22
- Position: Running back

Personal information
- Born: September 6, 1980 (age 46); Red Bank, New Jersey, U.S.
- Listed height: 5 ft 10 in (1.78 m)
- Listed weight: 210 lb (95 kg)

Career information
- High school: Red Bank Regional (Little Silver, New Jersey)
- College: Penn State
- NFL draft: 2002: undrafted

Career history
- Chicago Bears (2002)*; Washington Redskins (2003)*; Chicago Bears (2003)*; Philadelphia Eagles (2003)*; Berlin Thunder (2004); Philadelphia Eagles (2004–2005)
- * Offseason or practice squad member only

Career NFL statistics
- Rushing attempts: 9
- Rushing yards: 54
- Receptions: 2
- Receiving yards: 15
- Stats at Pro Football Reference

Eric Franklin McCoo Jr. (born September 6, 1980) is an American former professional football player who was a running back for one season with the Philadelphia Eagles of the National Football League (NFL). He played college football for the Penn State Nittany Lions.

== Early life ==
A native of Red Bank, New Jersey, McCoo earned High School All-American honors at Red Bank Regional High School.

== College career ==
McCoo finished his college career ranked ninth on Penn State's all-time rushing list with 2,518 yards, leading the Nittany Lions in rushing three years. As a freshman, he compiled 822 yards on 127 carries and posted the top single-game rushing total by a freshman in school history (206 yards vs. Michigan State).

McCoo majored in recreational management at Penn State.

== Professional career ==
McCoo began his professional career as a rookie free agent with the Chicago Bears in 2002, but was then acquired by the Philadelphia Eagles as a free agent following the 2003 season. Allocated by Philadelphia to NFL Europa, he led the league in rushing and won MVP of World Bowl XII with the Berlin Thunder, highlighted by a World Bowl record 67-yard touchdown run. McCoo parlayed his successful NFL Europe experience into a spot on the Eagles practice squad on September 22, 2004, and was later promoted to the active roster on December 28, 2004, during the Eagles run to a NFC championship and appearance in Super Bowl XXXIX. He played in the final regular season game, rushing for 54 yards on nine carries with two receptions for 15 yards.

McCoo was released by the Eagles before the 2005 season and was not claimed by any other team.

					Game		Rush							Rece												
Year	Age	Tm	Pos	No.	G	GS	Rush	Yds	TD	Lng	Y/A	Y/G	A/G	Tgt	Rec	Yds	Y/R	TD	Lng	R/G	Y/G	Ctch%	YScm	RRTD	Fmb	AV
2004	24	PHI		22	1	0	9	54	0	12	6.0	54.0	9.0	5	2	15	7.5	0	8	2.0	15.0	40.0%	69	0	0	1
Career					1	0	9	54	0	12	6.0	54.0	9.0	5	2	15	7.5	0	8	2.0	15.0		69	0	0	1

Provided by Pro-Football-Reference.com: View Original Table Generated 4/20/2018.
