= Leonard Stephens =

American football player (born 1978)

No. 49
- Position: Tight end

Personal information
- Born: July 9, 1978 (age 48); Miami, Florida, U.S.
- Listed height: 6 ft 3 in (1.91 m)
- Listed weight: 250 lb (113 kg)

Career information
- College: Howard
- NFL draft: 2000: undrafted

Career history
- San Diego Raiders (2000)*; Detroit Lions (2001)*; Washington Redskins (2002); Frankfurt Galaxy (2004); Washington Redskins (2004)*; Detroit Lions (2004–2005)*; Tampa Bay Buccaneers (2006)*; Seattle Seahawks (2006–2007)*; Tennessee Titans (2007–2008)*
- * Offseason or practice squad member only

Career NFL statistics
- Receptions: 1
- Receiving yards: 13
- Touchdowns: 0
- Stats at Pro Football Reference

Leonard Stephens (born July 9, 1978) is an American former professional football player who was a tight end in the National Football League (NFL). He played high school football at West Windsor Plainsboro High School in Princeton Junction, New Jersey, and college football for the Howard Bison. He was signed by the San Diego Chargers as an undrafted free agent in 2000.

Stephens was also a member of the Detroit Lions, Washington Redskins, Tampa Bay Buccaneers, Seattle Seahawks and Tennessee Titans. In 2002, he appeared in five games for Washington and had one reception for 13 yards.
