= John Schlecht =

American football player (born 1978)

No. 93
- Position: Defensive tackle

Personal information
- Born: May 23, 1978 (age 48); Saint Paul, Minnesota
- Listed height: 6 ft 0 in (1.83 m)
- Listed weight: 290 lb (132 kg)

Career information
- High school: White Bear Lake (MN)
- College: Minnesota
- NFL draft: 2001: undrafted

Career history
- San Francisco 49ers (2001–2002); New Orleans Saints (2003)*; Frankfurt Galaxy (2003–2004); Seattle Seahawks (2004)*; Los Angeles Avengers (2005)
- * Offseason or practice squad member only
- Stats at Pro Football Reference

John Schlecht (born May 23, 1978) is an American former football defensive tackle. He played for the San Francisco 49ers in 2001.
