= Maugaula Tuitele =

American football player (born 1978)

No. 96, 47, 99, 59, 50
- Position: Linebacker

Personal information
- Born: May 26, 1978 (age 48); Torrance, California, U.S.
- Listed height: 6 ft 1 in (1.85 m)
- Listed weight: 250 lb (113 kg)

Career information
- High school: Pacific (San Bernardino, California)
- College: Colorado State
- NFL draft: 2000: undrafted

Career history
- New England Patriots (2000–2001); Tampa Bay Buccaneers (2001)*; Rhein Fire (2002); New England Patriots (2002); Buffalo Bills (2002); New England Patriots (2002); Rhein Fire (2004); Oakland Raiders (2004)
- * Offseason or practice squad member only

Career NFL statistics
- Games: 15
- Tackles: 4
- Stats at Pro Football Reference

Maugaula Norman Tuitele (born May 26, 1978) is an American former professional football player who was a linebacker in the National Football League (NFL). He played college football for the Colorado State Rams and was signed as an undrafted free agent by the New England Patriots in 2000.

Tuitele was also a member of the Tampa Bay Buccaneers, Buffalo Bills, and Oakland Raiders. Tuitele's son, Tama, played linebacker at the United States Naval Academy.
