= Demetric Evans =

American football player (born 1979)

No. 92, 93
- Position: Defensive end

Personal information
- Born: September 3, 1979 (age 47); Haynesville, Louisiana, U.S.
- Listed height: 6 ft 4 in (1.93 m)
- Listed weight: 275 lb (125 kg)

Career information
- High school: Haynesville
- College: Georgia
- NFL draft: 2001: undrafted

Career history
- Dallas Cowboys (2001–2002); Cologne Centurions (2004); Washington Redskins (2004–2008); San Francisco 49ers (2009–2010)

Career NFL statistics
- Games played: 126
- Total tackles: 175
- Sacks: 14.5
- Forced fumbles: 4
- Fumble recoveries: 1
- Stats at Pro Football Reference

Demetric Untrell Evans (born September 3, 1979) is an American former professional football player who was a defensive end in the National Football League (NFL) for the Dallas Cowboys, Washington Redskins and San Francisco 49ers. He also was a member of the Cologne Centurions in NFL Europe. He played college football for the Georgia Bulldogs.

== Early life ==
Evans attended Haynesville High School. He was a three-year starter and helped his team win 3 consecutive state titles from 1994 to 1996.

As a senior, he was a two-way tackle, collecting 75 tackles (28 for loss), 12 sacks and 25 quarterback pressures. He received All-district, All-state, and AA Defensive Player of the Year honors. In 2007, Evans' jersey was retired by the school.

Evans also played basketball and averaged 15 points and 9 rebounds per game as a senior.

== College career ==
Evans accepted a football scholarship to attend the University of Georgia. As a true freshman, he appeared in 5 games and had 2 tackles. As a sophomore, he appeared in all 11 games, collecting 19 tackles and one quarterback pressure.

As a junior, he posted 30 tackles and one sack. He started in the 2000 Outback Bowl 28–25 win against Purdue University.

As a senior, he appeared in all 11 games with 3 starts, making 32 tackles. He finished his college career with 86 tackles, 3 starts and was a part of 4 bowl game wins.

== Professional career ==
=== Dallas Cowboys ===
Evans signed as an undrafted free agent by the Dallas Cowboys after the 2001 NFL draft on April 27. As a rookie, he played in all 16 games as a reserve defensive end and on special teams. He registered 35 defensive tackles, one sack, 5 quarterback pressures, 2 passes defensed, one forced fumble and 6 special teams tackles. He had 5 tackles and one quarterback pressure in the ninth game against the Philadelphia Eagles. He made 4 tackles (one for loss) and one quarterback pressure against the Seattle Seahawks. He had 4 tackles and one quarterback pressure in the season finale against the Detroit Lions.

In 2002, Evans saw action in 4 games and was declared inactive in 12 contests. He posted 7 tackles, 2 quarterback pressures and one special teams tackle. He had 2 tackles and one quarterback pressure in the season finale against the Detroit Lions. He was released on August 31, 2003.

=== Cologne Centurions ===
In the spring of 2004 after being out of football for a year, Evans played for the Cologne Centurions of NFL Europe. He tallied 24 tackles and 2.5 sacks.

=== Washington Redskins ===
On June 16, 2004, he was signed as a free agent by the Washington Redskins. Not only did he surprised observers by making the team, but because of different injuries suffered by Phillip Daniels, he played in 12 games (8 starts) at right defensive end, recording 31 tackles and 2.5 sacks. He missed 4 games due to an ankle injury.

Evans became a core special teams player in the following years, until 2008, when he was considered the Redskins best defensive end after appearing in 16 games (11 starts) and also playing defensive tackle on the nickel defense, while finishing tied for second on the team with 3.5 sacks.

=== San Francisco 49ers ===
On March 10, 2009, Evans signed in free agency with the San Francisco 49ers a two-year contract, to play defensive end in a 3-4 defense. He played in 14 games, and missed 2 games due to an injury against the Colts.

In 2010, he appeared in all 16 games as a reserve player. He wasn't re-signed after the season and Evans announced his retirement.

== NFL career statistics ==
Legend
**Bold**	Career high

=== Regular season ===
Year	Team	Games		Tackles					Interceptions					Fumbles			
Year	Team	GP	GS	Cmb	Solo	Ast	Sck	TFL	Int	Yds	TD	Lng	PD	FF	FR	Yds	TD
2001	DAL	**16**	0	23	19	4	1.0	2	0	0	0	0	2	0	0	0	0
2002	DAL	4	0	3	2	1	0.0	0	0	0	0	0	0	**2**	0	0	0
2004	WAS	12	8	26	17	9	2.5	4	0	0	0	0	1	0	0	0	0
2005	WAS	**16**	3	22	17	5	3.0	3	0	0	0	0	2	0	**1**	0	0
2006	WAS	**16**	0	16	14	2	2.0	4	0	0	0	0	1	1	0	0	0
2007	WAS	**16**	1	25	18	7	1.0	4	0	0	0	0	**3**	1	0	0	0
2008	WAS	**16**	**11**	**33**	**21**	**12**	**3.5**	**6**	0	0	0	0	2	0	0	0	0
2009	SFO	14	0	12	5	7	1.5	2	0	0	0	0	1	0	0	0	0
2010	SFO	**16**	0	15	12	3	0.0	1	0	0	0	0	1	0	0	0	0
		126	23	175	125	50	14.5	26	0	0	0	0	13	4	1	0	0

=== Playoffs ===
Year	Team	Games		Tackles					Interceptions					Fumbles			
Year	Team	GP	GS	Cmb	Solo	Ast	Sck	TFL	Int	Yds	TD	Lng	PD	FF	FR	Yds	TD
2005	WAS	**2**	**1**	**5**	**5**	0	**1.0**	**1**	0	0	0	0	**1**	0	0	0	0
2007	WAS	1	0	0	0	0	0.0	0	0	0	0	0	0	0	0	0	0
		3	1	5	5	0	1.0	1	0	0	0	0	1	0	0	0	0

== Personal life ==
Evans graduated from the University of Georgia with a degree in Consumer Science. He also completed his master's degree from the University of Alabama. Most recently, Evans was honored with the 2019 "40 Under 40" Award by the University of Georgia. Evans is married to Dr. Aungel Evans and they have two sons, Noah and Logan.

In August 2018, Evans was inducted into the Ark-La-Tex Sports Museum of Champions. He is currently a consultant for the National Football League Players Association.
