= J. J. Jones (linebacker) =

American football player (born 1978)

No. 59
- Position: Linebacker

Personal information
- Born: June 7, 1978 (age 48); Little Rock, Arkansas
- Listed height: 6 ft 0 in (1.83 m)
- Listed weight: 231 lb (105 kg)

Career information
- High school: Magnolia (Magnolia, Arkansas)
- College: Arkansas
- NFL draft: 2001: undrafted

Career history
- Dallas Cowboys (2001)*; New Orleans Saints (2002); Scottish Claymores (2004)
- * Offseason or practice squad member only
- Stats at Pro Football Reference

Jerry Glenn "J. J." Jones (born June 7, 1978) is an American former football linebacker who played for the New Orleans Saints of the National Football League (NFL). He played college football at University of Arkansas.

Jones began his pro career in 2001 as an undrafted free agent in Dallas Cowboys training camp. On January 16, 2002, he signed with the New Orleans Saints. In 13 games, Jones had six tackles (five solo). On April 26, 2003, Jones left the Saints on an injury settlement.

In 2004, Jones played in nine games with seven starts for the Scottish Claymores of NFL Europe. He had five tackles and a pass defended.
