= Jermaine Mays =

American football player (born 1979)

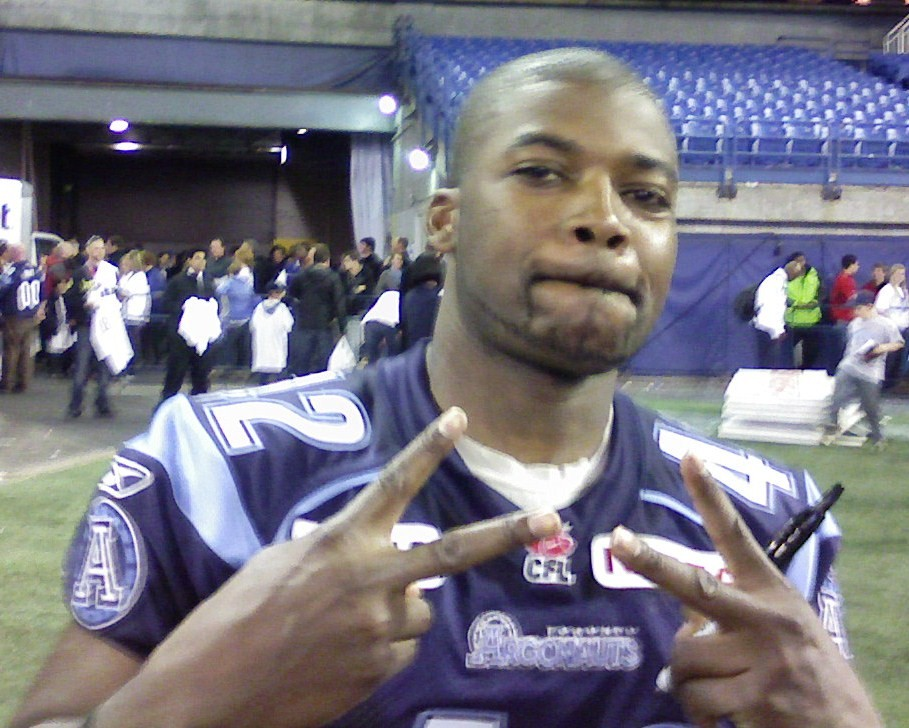
- Mays with the Toronto Argonauts in 2008

Profile
- Position: Cornerback

Personal information
- Born: July 13, 1979 (age 47); Miami, Florida, U.S.
- Listed height: 5 ft 11 in (1.80 m)
- Listed weight: 180 lb (82 kg)

Career information
- High school: Miami Jackson
- College: Minnesota
- NFL draft: 2003: undrafted

Career history
- 2003–2004: Minnesota Vikings*
- 2005: Indianapolis Colts*
- 2006: Orlando Predators
- 2006: Nashville Kats
- 2006–2007: Toronto Argonauts
- 2008: Hamilton Tiger-Cats*
- 2008: Toronto Argonauts
- * Offseason or practice squad member only
- Stats at CFL.ca (archive)
- Stats at ArenaFan.com

Jermaine Mays (born July 13, 1979) is an American former professional football player who was a cornerback in the Canadian Football League (CFL) and Arena Football League (AFL). He was signed as an undrafted free agent by the Minnesota Vikings of the National Football League (NFL) in 2003. He played college football for the Minnesota Golden Gophers.

Mays was also a member of the Indianapolis Colts, Orlando Predators, Nashville Kats, Toronto Argonauts, and Hamilton Tiger-Cats.

== Early life ==
Mays was born in Miami, Florida, on July 13, 1979, and he grew up there. He attended Miami Jackson High School where he was an All-State selection in his senior year despite breaking his collarbone.

== College career ==
Mays attended the University of Minnesota and played football at the wide receiver position for the Golden Gophers in 2001 and 2002. He majored in Youth Studies & Leadership while at Minnesota.

After getting redshirted in 2000, Mays saw limited action in 2001. He recorded 21 receptions and 381 yards. He also scored an 81-yard touchdown which proved to be a game winner against Iowa.

In 2002, Mays won the team MVP award after playing on special teams and setting a school record with five blocked punts in one season.

== Professional career ==
=== Minnesota Vikings ===
Mays was signed as an undrafted free agent by the Minnesota Vikings on September 10, 2003, as a wide receiver. On August 5, 2003, Mays switched to cornerback.

Mays was assigned by the Vikings to the Berlin Thunder in 2004. He helped lead the Thunder to a World Bowl. The Vikings released him on September 6, 2004.

=== Indianapolis Colts ===
Mays was signed by the Indianapolis Colts on February 11, 2005 and was assigned to the Berlin Thunder. He recorded 22 tackles, and scored a touchdown for 100 yards which is the league record. He was released by the Colts on September 4, 2005.

=== Orlando Predators ===
The Orlando Predators signed Mays on October 12, 2005, but did not play in any games for the Predators that season.

In 2006, he started the first four games for the Predators before he pulled his hamstring and was traded.

=== Nashville Kats ===
Mays was traded to the Nashville Kats for future Toronto Argonauts teammate defensive back Khalil Carter on March 15, 2006. He recorded 74 tackles, two interceptions one of which he returned for a touchdown during his rookie year.

=== Toronto Argonauts (first stint) ===
Mays was signed by the Toronto Argonauts on May 12, 2006. He played in eight games for the Argonauts, seven of which he started. Made his CFL debut against the Hamilton Tiger-Cats and recorded his first interception in the CFL in the same game, picking off Jason Maas.

In 2007, he dressed for four games with the Argonauts, but was released on August 18, 2007.

=== Hamilton Tiger-Cats ===
On March 7, 2008, Mays was signed by the Hamilton Tiger-Cats. However, after not playing a game for the Tiger-Cats, he was released on July 29, 2008.

=== Toronto Argonauts (second stint) ===
The Argonauts re-signed Mays on October 15, 2008. He was released on May 29, 2009.
