= World Bowl XII =

2004 NFL Europe championship game

Frankfurt Galaxy (2nd)	Berlin Thunder (1st)
24	30
	1	2	3	4	Total
FRA	3	7	0	14	24
BER	7	3	13	7	30
- Date: Saturday, June 12, 2004
- Stadium: Arena AufSchalke; Gelsenkirchen, Germany
- MVP: Eric McCoo, Running back
- Referee: Bill Vinovich
- Attendance: 35,413

Ceremonies
- Halftime show: Dr. Alban

TV in the United States
- Network: Fox
- Announcers: Curt Menefee and Brian Baldinger

World Bowl XII was NFL Europe's 2004 championship game. The game was played at Arena AufSchalke in Gelsenkirchen, Germany on June 12, 2004. In this game, the defending champion Frankfurt Galaxy returned to try to protect their title after going through a 7–3 regular season. Their opponent was the Berlin Thunder, as they entered the contest after a franchise-best 9–1 regular season. 35,413 fans were in attendance to watch this championship bout. The Thunder's regular season record pretty much explained their performance, as they stripped the Galaxy of their championship belt in a close match-up. The final score was 30–24, in favor of Berlin. Thunder RB Eric McCoo won MVP honors by running 28 times for 167 yards and a touchdown, with his longest run being 69 yards.

== Background ==
The Thunder won the regular season series against the Galaxy, 31–27 in Frankfurt and 41–0 in Berlin.

== Game summary ==
World Bowl XII began with the Galaxy getting the ball first, yet four plays and one "Delay of Game" penalty later, QB J. T. O'Sullivan tried to pass to RB Skip Hicks and his pass got intercepted by Berlin DT Montique Sharpe, who returned the ball 28 yards for a touchdown. The Galaxy would then start their second drive at their own 25-yard line. Despite going 66 yards on 11 plays, the Thunder defense forced the Galaxy to settle for a 28-yard field goal by Ralf Kleinmann. In the second quarter, both teams prevented each other from scoring for most of the period. It wasn't until the final two minutes of the half that the scoring would continue, with J. T. O'Sullivan leading a 5-play, 55-yard drive and capping it off with an 8-yard TD pass to WR Derrick Lewis. With less than a minute to go in the half, Thunder QB Rohan Davey got a 7-play, 51-yard drive going, yet Frankfurt's defense forced Berlin to settle for a 38-yard field goal by Jonathan Ruffin, which gave the Berlin Thunder a 10–7 halftime lead. In the third quarter, one play was all that was needed on their second drive of the half, as a little trick play helped QB Rohan Davey get the ball to WR Richard Alston, who in turn completed a 60-yard TD pass to fellow WR Chas Gessner. The Thunder would later continue to pour on their lead, as Ruffin kicked a 42-yard field goal to give the Thunder a 23–10 lead going into the fourth quarter. In the fourth quarter, the Thunder got their final points of the game, as MVP RB Eric McCoo ran 69 yards for a touchdown. With the Galaxy trailing 30–10 with under six minutes to play, they needed points and they needed them fast. They would respond as O'Sullivan lead a 5-play, 64-yard drive and wrap it up with a 17-yard TD pass to WR Drew Haddad. On their next drive, O'Sullivan would throw a 19-yard pass to Derrick Lewis. Unfortunately, it was too little, too late as the Thunder would wind the game clock to zero and clinch their third World Bowl title in four years.

=== Scoring summary ===
- Berlin - TD Sharpe 28 yd INT return 2:25 1st
- Frankfurt - FG Kleinmann 28 yd 7:42 1st
- Frankfurt - TD Lewis 8 yd pass from O'Sullivan 14:01 2nd
- Berlin - FG Ruffin 38 yd 15:00 2nd
- Berlin - TD Gessner 60 yd pass from Alston 3:35 3rd
- Berlin - FG Ruffin 42 yd 12:23 3rd
- Berlin - FG Ruffin 40 yd 3rd 14:07
- Berlin - TD McCoo 69 yr run 4th 8:34
- Frankfurt - TD Haddad 17 yd pass from O'Sullivan 10:55 4th
- Frankfurt - TD Lewis 19 yd pass from O'Sullivan 12:29 4th
