= 2004 NFL Europe season =

European American football season

The 2004 NFL Europe season was the 12th season in 14 years of the American football league that started out as the World League of American Football. The Cologne Centurions replaced the FC Barcelona Dragons for the 2004 season.

NFL Europe League
Team	W	L	T	PCT	PF	PA	Home	Road	STK
Berlin Thunder	9	1	0	.900	289	195	5–0	4–1	W4
Frankfurt Galaxy	7	3	0	.700	212	192	4–1	3–2	L1
Amsterdam Admirals	5	5	0	.500	173	191	3–2	2–3	W2
Cologne Centurions	4	6	0	.400	191	201	3–2	1–4	W1
Rhein Fire	3	7	0	.300	161	178	3–2	0–5	L4
Scottish Claymores	2	8	0	.200	128	197	1–4	1–4	L2

== World Bowl XII ==
World Bowl XII was held on Saturday, June 12, 2004 at Arena AufSchalke in Gelsenkirchen, Germany. The Berlin Thunder defeated the Frankfurt Galaxy, 30–24.
