= 2006 Amsterdam Admirals season =

NFL Europe team season

- General manager: Stefaan Eskes
- Head coach: Bart Andrus
- Home stadium: Amsterdam ArenA

Results
- Record: 7–3
- Division place: 1st
- Playoffs: Lost World Bowl XIV

The 2006 Amsterdam Admirals season was the 12th season for the team in the NFL Europe League (NFLEL). The team was led by head coach Bart Andrus in his sixth year, and played its home games at Amsterdam ArenA in Amsterdam, Netherlands. They finished the regular season in first place with a record of seven wins and three losses. In World Bowl XIV, Amsterdam lost to the Frankfurt Galaxy 7–22.

== Offseason ==
=== Free agent draft ===
2006 Amsterdam Admirals NFLEL free agent draft selections
| Draft order | | Player name | Position | College |
| Round | Choice | Player name | Position | College |
|---|---|---|---|---|
| 1 | 6 | James Lee | DT | Oregon State |
| 2 | 12 | Claude Harriott | DE | Pittsburgh |
| 3 | 13 | Kevin Timothee | CB | Florida International |
| 4 | 24 | Earl Cochran | DE | Alabama State |
| 5 | 25 | Tyler Lenda | T | Penn State |
| 6 | 36 | Michael Tolbert | LB | Baylor |
| 7 | 37 | Sam Massey | CB | Morgan State |
| 8 | 48 | Ben Herrell | T | Miami (OH) |
| 9 | 49 | Lamar Lee | CB | Arkansas State |

== Personnel ==
=== Staff ===
2006 Amsterdam Admirals staff
| Front office: General Manager – Stefaan Eskes; Head coaches: Head Coach/Quarterbacks – Bart Andrus; Offensive coaches: Offensive Coordinator/Wide Receivers – John Allen; Running Backs – Wendell Davis; Tight Ends – Robert Hunt; Offensive Line – Ron Heller | Defensive coaches: Co-Defensive Coordinator/Defensive Backs – Richard Kent; Co-Defensive Coordinator/Defensive Line – Rex Norris; Defensive Line – Kanavis McGhee; National Coach/Linebackers – John Leijten; Strength and conditioning: Strength and Conditioning – Tommy Perry |

=== Roster ===
2006 Amsterdam Admirals final roster
| Quarterbacks: 12 Jared Allen; 5 Gibran Hamdan; 17 Reggie Robertson; Running backs: 25 Larry Croom; 32 Diamond Ferri; Wide receivers: 87 Craig Bragg; 19 Vince Butler; 85 Skyler Fulton; 80 Chad Lucas; Tight ends: 84 Ben Hall; 85 Tory Humphrey; 81 Sean Mulcahy | Offensive linemen: 77 Marko Cavka T; 68 Ben Herrell G; 75 Atlas Herrion G; 60 Mike Johnson C; 65 Michael King G; 72 Tyler Lenda C; 73 Jeff Roehl T; 74 Clint Stickdorn T; Defensive linemen: 92 Tony Brown DT; 96 Jeremy Caudill DT; 99 Earl Cochran DE; 90 Claude Harriott DE; 94 Marcus Jasmin DT; 98 Darrell Lee DE; 91 James Lee DT | Linebackers: 45 Phil Archer MLB; 52 Brian Atkinson MLB; 44 Derrick Ballard OLB; 58 Jeremy Cain OLB; 47 Nick Hannah OLB; 52 Pasha Jackson OLB; 53 Shawn Morgan OLB; Defensive backs: 20 Atari Bigby FS/SS; 23 Abe Elimimian CB; 22 Cory Peoples SS; 26 Justin Perkins CB; 31 Art Thomas CB; 27 Kevin Timothee CB; Special teams: 6 Ryan Killeen K; 9 Glenn Pakulak P | National players: 28 (England) Jermaine Allen RB; 50 (Sweden) Carl-Johan Björk MLB; 11 (Japan) Syoei Hasegawa WR; 21 (Japan) Ryota Hori FS; 51 (Japan) Rikiya Ishida MLB; 18 (Japan) Noriaki Kinoshita WR; 71 (Belgium) Patrice Majondo-Mwamba DT; 56 (Netherlands) Akwasi Mensah OLB; 22 (France) Sandino Octobre RB; 82 (France) Yoan Schnee TE; Rookies in italics |

== Schedule ==
| Week | Date | Kickoff (Note: All times are in Central European Time (CET), or Central European Summer Time (CEST) after March 25.) | Opponent | Results | | Game site | Attendance |
| Week | Date | Kickoff | Opponent | Final score | Team record | Game site | Attendance |
|---|---|---|---|---|---|---|---|
| 1 | Saturday, March 18 | 7:00 p.m. | Berlin Thunder | L 29–33 | 0–1 | Amsterdam ArenA | 16,341 |
| 2 | Sunday, March 26 | 4:00 p.m. | at Cologne Centurions | W 20–15 | 1–1 | RheinEnergieStadion | 17,251 |
| 3 | Saturday, April 1 | 7:00 p.m. | Frankfurt Galaxy | W 38–20 | 2–1 | Amsterdam ArenA | 9,917 |
| 4 | Saturday, April 8 | 6:00 p.m. | at Berlin Thunder | W 38–31 | 3–1 | Olympic Stadium | 11,443 |
| 5 | Saturday, April 15 | 3:00 p.m. | Rhein Fire | W 35–31 | 4–1 | Amsterdam ArenA | 12,683 |
| 6 | Saturday, April 22 | 7:00 p.m. | at Rhein Fire | W 30–21 | 5–1 | LTU arena | 20,118 |
| 7 | Saturday, April 29 | 6:00 p.m. | at Hamburg Sea Devils | W 18–17 | 6–1 | AOL Arena | 15,224 |
| 8 | Saturday, May 6 | 7:00 p.m. | Cologne Centurions | L 13–20 | 6–2 | Amsterdam ArenA | 12,228 |
| 9 | Sunday, May 14 | 5:00 p.m. | at Frankfurt Galaxy | W 17–12 | 7–2 | Commerzbank-Arena | 31,769 |
| 10 | Saturday, May 20 | 7:00 p.m. | Hamburg Sea Devils | L 21–34 | 7–3 | Amsterdam ArenA | 15,937 |
World Bowl XIV
| 11 | Saturday, May 27 | 6:00 p.m. | Frankfurt Galaxy | L 7–22 | 7–4 | LTU arena | 36,286 |

== Standings ==
NFL Europe League
| Team | W | L | T | PCT | PF | PA | Home | Road | STK |
|---|---|---|---|---|---|---|---|---|---|
| Amsterdam Admirals | 7 | 3 | 0 | .700 | 259 | 234 | 2–3–0 | 5–0–0 | L1 |
| Frankfurt Galaxy | 7 | 3 | 0 | .700 | 172 | 160 | 4–1–0 | 3–2–0 | W1 |
| Rhein Fire | 6 | 4 | 0 | .600 | 207 | 165 | 4–1–0 | 2–3–0 | W1 |
| Cologne Centurions | 4 | 6 | 0 | .400 | 151 | 170 | 2–3–0 | 2–3–0 | L1 |
| Hamburg Sea Devils | 3 | 6 | 1 | .350 | 194 | 193 | 1–3–1 | 2–3–0 | W3 |
| Berlin Thunder | 2 | 7 | 1 | .250 | 180 | 241 | 1–4–0 | 1–3–1 | L5 |

== Game summaries ==
=== Week 1: vs Berlin Thunder ===
Week One: Berlin Thunder at Amsterdam Admirals – Game summary

| Quarter | 1 | 2 | 3 | 4 | Total |
|---|---|---|---|---|---|
| Berlin | 7 | 13 | 6 | 7 | 33 |
| Amsterdam | 0 | 7 | 7 | 15 | 29 |

at Amsterdam ArenA, Amsterdam, Netherlands

- Date: Saturday, March 18
- Game time: 7:06 p.m. CET
- Game weather: 32 °F (0 °C), roof open, partly cloudy
- Game attendance: 16,341
- Referee: Carl Cheffers

=== Week 2: at Cologne Centurions ===
Week Two: Amsterdam Admirals at Cologne Centurions – Game summary

| Quarter | 1 | 2 | 3 | 4 | Total |
|---|---|---|---|---|---|
| Amsterdam | 3 | 7 | 10 | 0 | 20 |
| Cologne | 0 | 13 | 0 | 2 | 15 |

at RheinEnergieStadion, Cologne, Germany

- Date: Sunday, March 26
- Game time: 4:05 p.m. CEST
- Game weather: 61 °F (16 °C), mostly cloudy
- Game attendance: 17,251
- Referee: Terry Brown

=== Week 3: vs Frankfurt Galaxy ===
Week Three: Frankfurt Galaxy at Amsterdam Admirals – Game summary

| Quarter | 1 | 2 | 3 | 4 | Total |
|---|---|---|---|---|---|
| Frankfurt | 7 | 3 | 3 | 7 | 20 |
| Amsterdam | 14 | 10 | 7 | 7 | 38 |

at Amsterdam ArenA, Amsterdam, Netherlands

- Date: Saturday, April 1
- Game time: 7:06 p.m. CEST
- Game weather: 54 °F (12 °C), roof open, partly cloudy
- Game attendance: 9,917
- Referee: Alberto Riveron

=== Week 4: at Berlin Thunder ===
Week Four: Amsterdam Admirals at Berlin Thunder – Game summary

| Quarter | 1 | 2 | 3 | 4 | Total |
|---|---|---|---|---|---|
| Amsterdam | 7 | 14 | 14 | 3 | 38 |
| Berlin | 7 | 14 | 0 | 10 | 31 |

at Olympic Stadium, Berlin, Germany

- Date: Saturday, April 8
- Game time: 6:05 p.m. CEST
- Game weather: 54 °F (12 °C), cloudy skies
- Game attendance: 11,443
- Referee: Craig Wrolstad

=== Week 5: vs Rhein Fire ===
Week Five: Rhein Fire at Amsterdam Admirals – Game summary

| Quarter | 1 | 2 | 3 | 4 | Total |
|---|---|---|---|---|---|
| Rhein | 7 | 17 | 0 | 7 | 31 |
| Amsterdam | 14 | 7 | 7 | 7 | 35 |

at Amsterdam ArenA, Amsterdam, Netherlands

- Date: Saturday, April 15
- Game time: 3:06 p.m. CEST
- Game weather: 58 °F (14 °C), roof open, fair
- Game attendance: 12,683
- Referee: John Parry

=== Week 6: at Rhein Fire ===
Week Six: Amsterdam Admirals at Rhein Fire – Game summary

| Quarter | 1 | 2 | 3 | 4 | Total |
|---|---|---|---|---|---|
| Amsterdam | 14 | 7 | 6 | 3 | 30 |
| Rhein | 7 | 7 | 0 | 7 | 21 |

at LTU arena, Düsseldorf, Germany

- Date: Saturday, April 22
- Game time: 7:06 p.m. CEST
- Game weather: 50 °F (10 °C), roof open, mostly cloudy
- Game attendance: 20,118
- Referee: Craig Wrolstad

=== Week 7: at Hamburg Sea Devils ===
Week Seven: Amsterdam Admirals at Hamburg Sea Devils – Game summary

| Quarter | 1 | 2 | 3 | 4 | Total |
|---|---|---|---|---|---|
| Amsterdam | 3 | 0 | 6 | 9 | 18 |
| Hamburg | 0 | 17 | 0 | 0 | 17 |

at AOL Arena, Hamburg, Germany

- Date: Saturday, April 29
- Game time: 6:05 p.m. CEST
- Game weather: 46 °F (8 °C), overcast
- Game attendance: 15,224
- Referee: Terry Brown

=== Week 8: vs Cologne Centurions ===
Week Eight: Cologne Centurions at Amsterdam Admirals – Game summary

| Quarter | 1 | 2 | 3 | 4 | Total |
|---|---|---|---|---|---|
| Cologne | 3 | 10 | 7 | 0 | 20 |
| Amsterdam | 3 | 0 | 0 | 10 | 13 |

at Amsterdam Arena, Amsterdam, Netherlands

- Date: Saturday, May 6
- Game time: 7:05 p.m. CEST
- Game weather: 71 °F (22 °C), roof open, clear skies, fair
- Game attendance: 12,228
- Referee: Carl Cheffers

=== Week 9: at Frankfurt Galaxy ===
Week Nine: Amsterdam Admirals at Frankfurt Galaxy – Game summary

| Quarter | 1 | 2 | 3 | 4 | Total |
|---|---|---|---|---|---|
| Amsterdam | 0 | 3 | 7 | 7 | 17 |
| Frankfurt | 3 | 3 | 0 | 6 | 12 |

at Commerzbank-Arena, Frankfurt, Germany

- Date: Sunday, May 14
- Game time: 5:05 p.m. CEST
- Game weather: 70 °F (21 °C), roof closed
- Game attendance: 31,769
- Referee: Greg Meyer

=== Week 10: vs Hamburg Sea Devils ===
Week Ten: Hamburg Sea Devils at Amsterdam Admirals – Game summary

| Quarter | 1 | 2 | 3 | 4 | Total |
|---|---|---|---|---|---|
| Hamburg | 3 | 14 | 7 | 10 | 34 |
| Amsterdam | 0 | 0 | 7 | 14 | 21 |

at Amsterdam ArenA, Amsterdam, Netherlands

- Date: Saturday, May 20
- Game time: 7:05 p.m. CEST
- Game weather: roof closed
- Game attendance: 15,937
- Referee: Jerome Boger

=== World Bowl XIV ===
World Bowl XIV: Frankfurt Galaxy vs Amsterdam Admirals – Game summary

| Quarter | 1 | 2 | 3 | 4 | Total |
|---|---|---|---|---|---|
| Frankfurt | 2 | 0 | 10 | 10 | 22 |
| Amsterdam | 0 | 7 | 0 | 0 | 7 |

at LTU arena, Düsseldorf, Germany

- Date: Saturday, May 27
- Game time: 6:06 p.m. CEST
- Game weather: 61 °F (16 °C), roof closed
- Game attendance: 36,286
- Referee: Jerome Boger
- TV announcers (NFL Network): Curt Menefee and Brian Baldinger

== Honors ==
After the completion of the regular season, the All-NFL Europe League team was selected by the NFLEL coaching staffs, members of a media panel and fans voting online at NFLEurope.com. Overall, Amsterdam had eight players selected. The selections were:

- Derrick Ballard, linebacker
- Skyler Fulton, wide receiver
- Gibran Hamdan, quarterback
- Ryan Killeen, placekicker
- Noriaki Kinoshita, special teams player
- Tyler Lenda, center
- Chad Lucas, wide receiver
- Jeff Roehl, tackle

Additionally, Hamdan and defensive tackle Tony Brown were named offensive and co-defensive MVPs, respectively. Hamdan, who was in his third season with the Admirals, set an NFLEL record by posting a passer rating of 113.4, leading his team to a 6–1 record before suffering a season-ending injury. He completed 102 of 162 passes for a league-leading 1,629 yards with 12 touchdowns. In the Week 3 contest against Frankfurt he became only the second quarterback in league history to post a perfect 158.3 rating. Brown, who shared the award with Cologne Centurions' linebacker Philippe Gardent, became the third player in NFLEL history to win defensive MVP honors despite not being voted to the All-NFLEL team. He recorded four sacks and 40 tackles during the season.
