= 2004 Amsterdam Admirals season =

NFL Europe team season

- General manager: Ronald Buys
- Head coach: Bart Andrus
- Home stadium: Amsterdam ArenA

Results
- Record: 5–5
- Division place: 3rd
- Playoffs: did not qualify

The 2004 Amsterdam Admirals season was the tenth season for the franchise in the NFL Europe League (NFLEL). The team was led by head coach Bart Andrus in his fourth year, and played its home games at Amsterdam ArenA in Amsterdam, Netherlands. They finished the regular season in third place with a record of five wins and five losses.

== Offseason ==
=== Free agent draft ===
2004 Amsterdam Admirals NFLEL free agent draft selections
Draft order		Player name	Position	College
Round	Choice	Player name	Position	College
1	2	Darrell Wright	DE	Oregon
2	8	Tyler Lender	G	Penn State
3	17	Drew Wahlroos	LB	Colorado
4	20	Ligarius Jennings	CB	Tennessee State
5	29	Rodney Thomas	LB	Clemson
6	32	Todd Howard	CB	Michigan
7	41	Ja'Waren Blair	DT	East Carolina
8	44	Reese Hicks	T	Georgetown
9	53	Tim Argiriadi	DT	Penn State
10	56	Terrance Leftwich	CB	Temple
11	65	Gregg Kellett	TE	Marshall
12	68	Chris Brown	T	Georgia Tech

== Personnel ==
=== Staff ===
2004 Amsterdam Admirals staff
Front office: General Manager – Ronald Buys; Head coaches: Head Coach/Quarterbacks – Bart Andrus; Offensive coaches: Offensive Coordinator/Running Backs – John Allen; Wide Receivers – Willie Davis; Offensive Line – Jeff Lewis; Assistant Offensive Line/Tight Ends – Ron Heller	Defensive coaches: Defensive Coordinator/Linebackers – Darryl Sims; Defensive Line – Rex Norris; Defensive Backs/Special Teams – Jeff Reinebold; National Coach/Assistant Linebackers – John Leijten; Strength and conditioning: Strength and Conditioning – Joseph Benes

=== Roster ===
2004 Amsterdam Admirals final roster
Quarterbacks: 2 Gibran Hamdan; 11 Clint Stoerner; Running backs: 21 Jason Anderson (IR); 20 Chris Downs; Wide receivers: 5 Antoine Burns (IR); 7 Andre Forde; 81 Chris Horn; 1 Chris Taylor; Tight ends: 89 Kane Anderson; 87 Tony Donald	Offensive linemen: 65 Thomas Barnett T; 77 Mario Branch T; 70 Chris Brown G; 76 Josh Burr T (IR); 66 Joey Hollenbeck C; 72 Tyler Lenda C/G; 75 Justin Sands T; 73 Dave Volk G; 62 Brady Washburn G/T; Defensive linemen: 97 Charles Alston DE; 90 Ja'Waren Blair DT; 98 Clint Mitchell DE; 60 John Nix DT; 93 Thomas Pittman DT (IR); 91 Buck Rasmussen DT; 96 Alonzo Shuler DT (IR); 99 Darrell Wright DE	Linebackers: 55 Kenny Jackson MLB; 58 Steve Josue OLB; 56 Ben Mahdavi OLB; 44 Jerry Schumacher MLB; 53 Drew Wahlroos OLB; Defensive backs: 43 Derek Combs CB; 38 Nashville Dyer CB; 26 Todd Howard CB; 25 Ligarius Jennings CB/FS; 33 Jason Perry SS; 30 Willie Pile FS; 29 Jeff Sanchez CB (IR); Special teams: 15 Nate Fikse P; 16 Todd Sievers K	National players: 85 (Japan) Sumitaka Ando WR; 14 (Netherlands) Silvio Diliberto K; 88 (Mexico) Alejandro Gamez WR; 51 (Japan) Rikiya Ishida MLB; 22 (France) Sandino Octobre RB; 54 (Mexico) Antonio Rodriguez OLB; 83 (Mexico) Carlos Rosado WR; 27 (Japan) Kohei Satomi SS; Rookies in italics

== Schedule ==
Week	Date	Kickoff (Note: All times local to where the game was played.)	Opponent	Results		Game site	Attendance
Week	Date	Kickoff	Opponent	Final score	Team record	Game site	Attendance
1	Saturday, April 3	7:00 p.m.	at Frankfurt Galaxy	L 11–34	0–1	Waldstadion	21,269
2	Saturday, April 10	7:00 p.m.	Berlin Thunder	L 17–28	0–2	Amsterdam ArenA	10,763
3	Sunday, April 18	2:00 p.m.	at Scottish Claymores	W 3–0	1–2	Hampden Park	10,971
4	Sunday, April 25	3:00 p.m.	Frankfurt Galaxy	W 21–17 ^{OT}	2–2	Amsterdam ArenA	10,684
5	Sunday, May 2	4:00 p.m.	at Berlin Thunder	L 29–33	2–3	Olympic Stadium	12,909
6	Sunday, May 9	4:00 p.m.	at Rhein Fire	L 13–20	2–4	Arena AufSchalke	18,790
7	Saturday, May 15	7:00 p.m.	Cologne Centurions	W 17–10	3–4	Amsterdam ArenA	14,437
8	Friday, May 21	8:00 p.m.	Scottish Claymores	L 17–19	3–5	Amsterdam ArenA	10,738
9	Sunday, May 30	4:00 p.m.	at Cologne Centurions	W 23–18	4–5	RheinEnergieStadion	9,056
10	Sunday, June 6	3:00 p.m.	Rhein Fire	W 22–12	5–5	Amsterdam ArenA	15,874

== Standings ==
NFL Europe League
Team	W	L	T	PCT	PF	PA	Home	Road	STK
Berlin Thunder	9	1	0	.900	289	195	5–0	4–1	W4
Frankfurt Galaxy	7	3	0	.700	212	192	4–1	3–2	L1
Amsterdam Admirals	5	5	0	.500	173	191	3–2	2–3	W2
Cologne Centurions	4	6	0	.400	191	201	3–2	1–4	W1
Rhein Fire	3	7	0	.300	161	178	3–2	0–5	L4
Scottish Claymores	2	8	0	.200	128	197	1–4	1–4	L2

== Game summaries ==
=== Week 1: at Frankfurt Galaxy ===
Week One: Amsterdam Admirals at Frankfurt Galaxy – Game summary

Quarter	1	2	3	4	Total
Amsterdam	3	0	0	8	11
Frankfurt	0	17	7	10	34

at Waldstadion, Frankfurt, Germany

- Date: Saturday, April 3
- Game time: 7:10 p.m. CEST
- Game attendance: 21,269
- Referee: Gerald Austin

=== Week 2: vs Berlin Thunder ===
Week Two: Berlin Thunder at Amsterdam Admirals – Game summary

Quarter	1	2	3	4	Total
Berlin	0	7	14	7	28
Amsterdam	0	10	0	7	17

at Amsterdam ArenA, Amsterdam, Netherlands

- Date: Saturday, April 10
- Game time: 7:07 p.m. CEST
- Game attendance: 10,763
- Referee: Carl Cheffers

=== Week 3: at Scottish Claymores ===
Week Three: Amsterdam Admirals at Scottish Claymores – Game summary

Quarter	1	2	3	4	Total
Amsterdam	3	0	0	0	3
Scotland	0	0	0	0	0

at Hampden Park, Glasgow, Scotland

- Date: Sunday, April 18
- Game time: 2:00 p.m. BST
- Game attendance: 10,971
- Referee: Gene Steratore

=== Week 4: vs Frankfurt Galaxy ===
Week Four: Frankfurt Galaxy at Amsterdam Admirals – Game summary

Quarter	1	2	3	4	OT	Total
Frankfurt	7	3	7	0	0	17
Amsterdam	0	7	3	7	4	21

at Amsterdam ArenA, Amsterdam, Netherlands

- Date: Sunday, April 25
- Game time: 3:00 p.m. CEST
- Game attendance: 10,684
- Referee: Bill Vinovich

=== Week 5: at Berlin Thunder ===
Week Five: Amsterdam Admirals at Berlin Thunder – Game summary

Quarter	1	2	3	4	Total
Amsterdam	0	7	7	15	29
Berlin	0	12	7	14	33

at Olympic Stadium, Berlin, Germany

- Date: Sunday, May 2
- Game time: 4:06 p.m. CEST
- Game attendance: 12,909
- Referee: Ed Hochuli

=== Week 6: at Rhein Fire ===
Week Six: Amsterdam Admirals at Rhein Fire – Game summary

Quarter	1	2	3	4	Total
Amsterdam	0	3	7	3	13
Rhein	14	0	3	3	20

at Arena AufSchalke, Gelsenkirchen, Germany

- Date: Sunday, May 9
- Game time: 4:06 p.m. CEST
- Game attendance: 18,790
- Referee: John Parry

=== Week 7: vs Cologne Centurions ===
Week Seven: Cologne Centurions at Amsterdam Admirals – Game summary

Quarter	1	2	3	4	Total
Cologne	0	3	7	0	10
Amsterdam	7	7	3	0	17

at Amsterdam ArenA, Amsterdam, Netherlands

- Date: Saturday, May 15
- Game time: 7:08 p.m. CEST
- Game attendance: 14,437
- Referee: Gerald Austin

=== Week 8: vs Scottish Claymores ===
Week Eight: Scottish Claymores at Amsterdam Admirals – Game summary

Quarter	1	2	3	4	Total
Scotland	3	13	0	3	19
Amsterdam	3	0	7	7	17

at Amsterdam ArenA, Amsterdam, Netherlands

- Date: Friday, May 21
- Game time: 8:07 p.m. CEST
- Game attendance: 10,738
- Referee: Carl Cheffers

=== Week 9: at Cologne Centurions ===
Week Nine: Amsterdam Admirals at Cologne Centurions – Game summary

Quarter	1	2	3	4	Total
Amsterdam	7	7	3	6	23
Cologne	4	0	7	7	18

at RheinEnergieStadion, Cologne, Germany

- Date: Sunday, May 30
- Game time: 4:06 p.m. CEST
- Game attendance: 9,056
- Referee: Bill Vinovich

=== Week 10: vs Rhein Fire ===
Week Ten: Rhein Fire at Amsterdam Admirals – Game summary

Quarter	1	2	3	4	Total
Rhein	0	6	6	0	12
Amsterdam	7	0	8	7	22

at Amsterdam ArenA, Amsterdam, Netherlands

- Date: Sunday, June 6
- Game time: 3:05 p.m. CEST
- Game attendance: 15,874
- Referee: Walt Anderson
