= Robert Hunt (American football coach) =

American football player and coach (born 1975)

Profile
- Position: Offensive line coach

Personal information
- Born: July 22, 1975 (age 51); Hampton, Virginia, U.S.
- Listed height: 6 ft 2 in (1.88 m)
- Listed weight: 290 lb (132 kg)

Career information
- High school: Newport News (VA) Menchville
- College: Virginia
- NFL draft: 1999: 7th round, 226th overall pick

Career history

Playing
- Tampa Bay Buccaneers (1999)*; New Orleans Saints (1999); Frankfurt Galaxy (2000); New Orleans Saints (2000)*; San Francisco Demons (2001); New York/New Jersey Hitmen (2001); Kansas City Chiefs (2001)*; Buffalo Bills (2002)*; New York Dragons (2003)*
- * Offseason or practice squad member only

Coaching
- Amsterdam Admirals (2005) Tight ends coach; Ferrum College (2005) Defensive line coach; Amsterdam Admirals (2006) Tight ends coach/special teams assistant; Amsterdam Admirals (2007) Tight ends coach/special teams coordinator; Howard University (2007–2008) Running game coordinator/offensive line coach; Toronto Argonauts (2009) Tights ends/offensive quality control coach; La Courneuve Flash (2010) Head coach; Bridgewater College (2010) Offensive line coach; Omaha Nighthawks (2011) Asst. offensive line/off. quality control coach; Omaha Nighthawks (2012) Offensive line coach

Awards and highlights
- World Bowl champion (XIII)

Robert Hunt (born July 22, 1975) is an American football coach and former guard. He graduated from Virginia and played in the National Football League (NFL) for the Tampa Bay Buccaneers (drafted in the 7th round in 1999) and in NFL Europe for Frankfurt Galaxy (2000).

== Early life ==
Hunt played high school football at Menchville High School in Newport News, Virginia, where he was a second-team Associated Press Group AAA all-state selection as a senior at offensive guard.

== Professional career ==
Pre-draft measurables
Height	Weight	40-yard dash	10-yard split	20-yard split	20-yard shuttle	Vertical jump	Broad jump	Bench press
6 ft 2 3/8 in (1.89 m)	291 lb (132 kg)	5.17 s	1.82 s	2.99 s	4.66 s	24.0 in (0.61 m)	7 ft 10 in (2.39 m)	23 reps
All values from NFL Combine

Hunt was drafted by the Tampa Bay Buccaneers in the seventh round (226th overall) of the 1999 NFL draft.

== Coaching career ==
=== Omaha Nighthawks ===
Hunt was named assistant offensive line and offensive quality control coach for the Omaha Nighthawks of the United Football League on February 23, 2011. He was later made offensive line coach for the Nighthawks.
