= Jeff Sanchez (defensive back, born 1981) =

American gridiron football player (born 1981)

No. 20, 26, 29
- Position: Cornerback

Personal information
- Born: January 21, 1981 (age 45); New Orleans, Louisiana
- Listed height: 5 ft 9 in (1.75 m)
- Listed weight: 175 lb (79 kg)

Career information
- High school: Meraux (LA) Hannan
- College: Tulane
- NFL draft: 2003: undrafted

Career history
- Dallas Cowboys (2003)*; Amsterdam Admirals (2004); Detroit Lions (2004)*; Dallas Cowboys (2004)*; Amsterdam Admirals (2005); Detroit Lions (2005)*; Tampa Bay Storm (2006); Toronto Argonauts (2006)*
- * Offseason or practice squad member only

Awards and highlights
- World Bowl champion (XIII)
- Stats at ArenaFan.com

Jeffrey Sanchez Jr. (born January 21, 1981) is a former professional American football cornerback who played in the National Football League, NFL Europe and Arena Football League.

== Early life ==
Sanchez attended and played high school football at Archbishop Hannan High School in Meraux, Louisiana.

== Professional career ==
Pre-draft measurables
Height	Weight
5 ft 10 1/8 in (1.78 m)	173 lb (78 kg)
Values from Pro Day

=== Dallas Cowboys ===
Sanchez was signed as an undrafted free agent by the Dallas Cowboys on July 28, 2003.
