= Steve Josue =

American football player (born 1980)

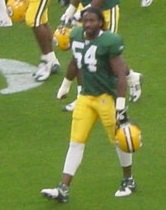
- Josue with the Green Bay Packers in 2004

No. 54, 58
- Position: Linebacker

Personal information
- Born: April 5, 1980 (age 46); Miami, Florida, U.S.
- Listed height: 6 ft 2 in (1.88 m)
- Listed weight: 235 lb (107 kg)

Career information
- High school: Miami (FL) North
- College: Carson–Newman
- NFL draft: 2003: 7th round, 257th overall pick

Career history
- Green Bay Packers (2003–2004)*; Amsterdam Admirals (2004); Washington Redskins (2004)*; San Francisco 49ers (2004)*; Green Bay Packers (2004); Baltimore Ravens (2005)*; Hamilton Tiger-Cats (2006)
- * Offseason or practice squad member only

Awards and highlights
- 2× first-team All-SAC (2001, 2002)
- Stats at Pro Football Reference

Steve Josue (born April 5, 1980) is an American former professional football linebacker who played in the National Football League (NFL), NFL Europe, and Canadian Football League (CFL). Josue played college football at Carson–Newman.

== Early life and college ==
Josue was born in Miami, Florida to Haitian immigrant parents. A 1998 graduate of North Miami High School, Josue lettered two years in football and one in basketball and was an All-State selection in 1997 as a senior.

Josue enrolled at the NCAA Division II Carson–Newman College and lettered four years from 1999 to 2002 after a redshirt year. In his redshirt freshman year (1999), Josue made 50 tackles (28 solo), three passes defensed, and 16 tackles for loss. Carson–Newman reached the NCAA Division II Football Championship title game in 1999, but lost, 58–52, to Northwest Missouri State in four overtime periods.

In his sophomore season (2000), Josue started all 10 games and made 42 tackles (20 solo), 16 stops for loss, seven sacks, one interception, one pass deflected, and one fumble recovery. As a junior (2001), Josue had 26 tackles (20 solo), a team-high 10 tackles for loss, and five sacks. In 2002, the Eagles promoted Josue to team captain and finished the season a perfect 11-0. In that year, Josue made 48 tackles (30 solo), 13.5 tackles for loss, 7 sacks, three passes defensed, two fumble recoveries, and one forced fumble.

With Carson-Newman, Josue received first-team All-SAC honors in his junior (2001) and senior (2002) years. Josue graduated in 2003 with a B.A. in computer information systems.

== Professional career ==
The Green Bay Packers selected Josue in the 7th round of the 2003 NFL draft with the 257th overall pick. After playing on the practice squad throughout the 2003 season, Josue re-signed as a free agent with the Packers on January 14, 2004 and was assigned to the NFL Europe team Amsterdam Admirals. Josue played all 10 games of the 2004 season with the Admirals (including five starts). In those games, Josue made 15 tackles (including 12 solo and one sack), defended two passes, and made one interception.

After stints on the practice squads of the Washington Redskins and San Francisco 49ers, Josue debuted in the 2004 NFL regular season on December 12, 2004 against the Detroit Lions and played in the final four games of the regular season and the Packers' Wild Card playoff loss to the Minnesota Vikings. Collectively, Josue made 9 tackles in those games. On April 26, 2005, the Packers waived Josue.

The Ravens released Josue on August 29, 2005, only 19 days after signing Josue.

On February 21, 2006, the Hamilton Tiger-Cats of the Canadian Football League signed Josue. The Tiger-Cats cut Josue after training camp on June 10 but re-signed him on June 22. Josue sealed the Tiger-Cats' 27-22 win on September 17 over the Edmonton Eskimos after forcing a last-minute fumble from Eskimos quarterback Ricky Ray. The Tiger-Cats released Josue on June 23, 2007.
