= Abe Elimimian =

American football player and coach (born 1982)

No. 37, 23
- Position: Cornerback

Personal information
- Born: March 2, 1982 (age 44); Calabar, Nigeria
- Listed height: 5 ft 10 in (1.78 m)
- Listed weight: 190 lb (86 kg)

Career information
- High school: Crenshaw (CA)
- College: Hawaii
- NFL draft: 2005: undrafted

Career history

Playing
- San Diego Chargers (2005)*; Chicago Bears (2006)*; Amsterdam Admirals (2006–2007)
- * Offseason or practice squad member only

Coaching
- Crenshaw High School (2007–2009) Defensive coordinator; SMU (2010–2011) Graduate assistant; Washington State (2012) Graduate assistant; Simon Fraser (2014) Defensive coordinator & linebackers coach; Hawaii (2015) Secondary coach; Hawaii (2015) Interim defensive coordinator & secondary coach; Hawaii (2016–2017) Secondary coach; Hawaii (2018–2019) Cornerbacks coach; Hawaii (2020) Cornerbacks coach & recruiting coordinator; Hawaii (2021) Running backs coach; Hawaii (2022–2023) Cornerbacks coach

Awards and highlights
- First-team All-WAC (2004)

Abraham Elimimian (born March 2, 1982) is an American football coach and former player who was most recently the cornerbacks coach at the University of Hawaii at Manoa.

== Playing career ==
Elimimian played cornerback at Hawaii from 2000 to 2004. He received offers from bigger schools such as Oregon State and Washington State but suffered a severe knee injury his senior year of high school, and the two schools withdrew. He received the final scholarship Hawaii had in 2000 highly due to the fact that his high school football coach was a former Hawaii standout and had contacted then-associate head coach George Lumpkin. In his senior season, Elimimian earned first-team all-WAC honors, one of eight Hawaii players to do so.

=== Professional career ===
After college, Elimimian went undrafted in the 2005 NFL draft and signed with the San Diego Chargers in 2005. He also spent one offseason with the Chicago Bears in 2006 before spending the regular season with the Amsterdam Admirals in 2006. He was then selected by Admirals again in the 13th round of the draft in 2007 and spent the season with them.

== Coaching career ==
After his playing career ended, Elimimian worked as the defensive coordinator at his alma mater Crenshaw High School from 2007 to 2009. Elimimian got his first college coaching job in 2010 when he was hired as a graduate assistant on his old college coach June Jones' staff. He then moved over to accept a graduate assistant position at Washington State in 2012, working specifically with the defensive backs.

Elimimian was named the defensive coordinator and linebackers coach at Simon Fraser in 2014, working under Jacques Chapdelaine. He also interviewed for the vacant head coaching job in 2014 after Chapdelaine resigned after one season to pursue other opportunities.

=== Hawaii ===
Elimimian was hired as the secondary coach at his alma mater Hawaii in 2015. He served as the defensive play-caller for the team's match-up against Louisiana–Monroe after defensive coordinator Tom Mason was reassigned to an administrative role. He was retained by newly hired head coach and former Warrior teammate Nick Rolovich in 2016, and changed from secondary coach to coaching exclusively cornerbacks in 2018 following the hire of Corey Batoon. Following Rolovich's departure from Hawaii in 2020, Elimimian was retained by new head coach Todd Graham and was also given the title of recruiting coordinator.

Elimimian and Hawaii parted ways prior to the start of the 2023 season.

== Personal life ==
Born in Calabar, Nigeria, and raised in Los Angeles, Elimimian is the son of a retired professor. His brother Solomon was a linebacker who also played at Hawaii and was the first pure defensive player to win the CFL's Most Outstanding Player Award and the first player to win three different CFL awards.
