= Tony Brown (defensive tackle) =

American football player (born 1980)

No. 92, 97
- Position: Defensive tackle

Personal information
- Born: September 29, 1980 (age 46); Chattanooga, Tennessee, U.S.
- Listed height: 6 ft 3 in (1.91 m)
- Listed weight: 305 lb (138 kg)

Career information
- High school: City (Chattanooga)
- College: Memphis
- NFL draft: 2003: undrafted

Career history
- Carolina Panthers (2003)*; Miami Dolphins (2003); San Francisco 49ers (2004); Carolina Panthers (2006); Amsterdam Admirals (2006); Tennessee Titans (2006–2010)
- * Offseason or practice squad member only

Career NFL statistics
- Total tackles: 226
- Sacks: 19.0
- Forced fumbles: 4
- Fumble recoveries: 5
- Pass deflections: 14
- Defensive touchdowns: 1
- Stats at Pro Football Reference

Robert Anthony Brown Jr. (born September 29, 1980) is an American former professional football player who was a defensive tackle in the National Football League (NFL). He was signed by the Carolina Panthers as an undrafted free agent in 2003. He played college football for the Memphis Tigers.

Brown was also member of the Miami Dolphins, San Francisco 49ers, and Tennessee Titans.

The Titans released Brown on July 28, 2011.

Brown now coaches at Rhea County High School
