= Earl Cochran =

American football player (1981–2025)

No. 94, 99, 60, 96, 98
- Position: Defensive end

Personal information
- Born: April 19, 1981; Bessemer, Alabama, U.S.
- Died: October 31, 2025 (aged 44)
- Listed height: 6 ft 5 in (1.96 m)
- Listed weight: 287 lb (130 kg)

Career information
- High school: Lanier (Bessemer)
- College: Alabama State
- NFL draft: 2003: undrafted

Career history
- Green Bay Packers (2003); Amsterdam Admirals (2005); Minnesota Vikings (2005)*; Amsterdam Admirals (2006); Houston Texans (2006–2008); California Redwoods (2009)
- * Offseason or practice squad member only

Awards and highlights
- First-team All-SWAC (2001); Second-team All-SWAC (2002)

Career NFL statistics
- Total tackles: 45
- Sacks: 3
- Forced fumbles: 1
- Fumble recoveries: 1
- Stats at Pro Football Reference

Earl Cochran Jr (April 19, 1981 – October 31, 2025) was an American former professional football player who was a defensive end in the National Football League (NFL). He played college football for the Alabama State Hornets and was signed by the Green Bay Packers as an undrafted free agent in 2003.

Cochran was also a member of the Amsterdam Admirals, Minnesota Vikings, Houston Texans, and California Redwoods.

== College career ==
During his senior season at Alabama State University, Cochran amassed 9.5 sacks for the Hornets, which earned him All-SWAC honors.

== Professional career ==
=== Green Bay Packers ===
Despite being undrafted, Cochran signed with the Green Bay Packers in 2003. During the 2003 preseason Earl suffered season-ending shoulder surgery and was placed on Injured Reserve, which eventually led to his release from the Packers on July 23, 2004.

=== Amsterdam Admirals (first stint) ===
Cochran played in 10 games, starting two, for the Amsterdam Admirals of NFL Europe during the 2005 NFL Europe season.

=== Minnesota Vikings ===
Cochran signed with the Minnesota Vikings on June 20, 2005, but was released prior to the regular season on September 3, 2005. In week 7 of the 2005 season Earl was brought back as a member of the Vikings practice squad. He was released several days later.

=== Amsterdam Admirals (second stint) ===
In the spring of 2006, Cochran was the starting left defensive end for the NFL Europe Amsterdam Admirals. He started 9 of 10 games and recorded 42 tackles, 9 assists and 5.0 sacks. His 51 total tackles and 5 sacks led the Admirals defense. He led the club to World Bowl XIV eventually losing to the Frankfurt Galaxy, 22–7.

=== Houston Texans ===
In June 2006 Cochran signed a contract with the Houston Texans, but was released following the final preseason game. Later in week 11 of the 2006 season Cochran was re-signed as a member of the Texans practice squad. In week 16 Cochran saw his first NFL action as a member of the Houston Texans, when he entered into the Texans' 2006 season finale versus the Cleveland Browns and recorded two tackles and two quarterback pressures. He became a free agent after the 2008 season.

=== California Redwoods ===
Cochran played in five games, starting four, for the California Redwoods of the United Football League in 2009.
