= Jonathan Smith (running back) =

American football player (born 1981)

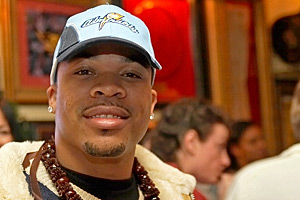
- Smith in 2007

Profile
- Position: Running back

Personal information
- Born: October 19, 1981 (age 45); Gardena, California, U.S.
- Listed height: 5 ft 10 in (1.78 m)
- Listed weight: 195 lb (88 kg)

Career information
- High school: Narbonne (Harbor City, California)
- College: Washington State
- NFL draft: 2004: undrafted

Career history
- Kansas City Chiefs (2004–2006)*; Amsterdam Admirals (2005, 2007)
- * Offseason or practice squad member only

Awards and highlights
- World Bowl champion (XIII); Pasadena City College: Mission Conference champion (2001); South County Bowl champion (2001); South County Bowl MVP (2001); Player Of The Year (2001); 1st Team All-American (2001); 1st Team All-State (2001); 1st Team All-Conference (2001); Pasadena City College Team MVP (2001); Most Inspirational Offensive Player (2001); Pasadena City College Hall of Fame (2011); Washington State: Pacific-10 co-champion (2002); Rose Bowl (2002); 2nd Team All-Pacific-10 (2003); Washington State Offensive MVP (2003)

Jonathan McKenzi Smith (born October 19, 1981) is an American former professional football player who was a member of the Amsterdam Admirals.

== Early life ==
He rushed 142 times for 1646 yards and 22 touchdowns. Earned All-Los Angeles City and league MVP honors as a senior at Narbonne High School in Harbor City, CA.

== College career ==
After attending Pasadena Community College, he transferred to Washington State University, where he played 25 games (starting eight) and scored 15 touchdowns.

He rushed for 1,245 yards on 296 carries (4.2-yard average) with 15 touchdowns. He also caught 48 passes for 525 yards with 3 touchdowns and 15 kickoff returns for 250 yards. Earned All-Pac-10 second-team honors after seeing duty in all 13 games as a senior. Rushed for 961 yards and 10 touchdowns in 2003. Added 33 receptions for 349 yards and 1 score. Appeared in 12 games as a reserve running back in 2002 and carried the ball 72 times for 284 yards and 5 touchdowns. Caught 15 passes for 176 yards and 2 scores. Enjoyed a standout 2001 season while smashing every rushing record at Pasadena Community College in 2001 before transferring to Washington State. Earned Junior College Gridware All-America and Mission Conference Player of the Year honors. Ran for 2,049 yards on 223 carries and scored 22 rushing touchdowns with a 9.7 rushing average. Added 46 catches for 533 yards and 9 touchdowns. Set a national junior college record with 515 all-purpose yards in a single game.

== Professional career ==
After not being selected in the 2004 NFL draft, Smith was signed by the Kansas City Chiefs. He was released in September, but was signed to the practice squad in December. In 2005, he was assigned to the Amsterdam Admirals of NFL Europe, playing in the backfield alongside Jarrett Payton, son of Pro Football Hall of Famer Walter Payton. That year, the Admirals won World Bowl XIII against the Berlin Thunder; Smith scored a 22-yard touchdown in the game.
