= Buck Rasmussen =

American gridiron football player (born 1978)

No. 69
- Position: Defensive tackle

Personal information
- Born: October 1, 1978 (age 48); Tekamah, Nebraska, U.S.
- Listed height: 6 ft 4 in (1.93 m)
- Listed weight: 285 lb (129 kg)

Career information
- College: Nebraska-Omaha
- NFL draft: 2003: undrafted

Career history
- New England Patriots (2003)*; (2004)*; Amsterdam Admirals (2004)); Winnipeg Blue Bombers (2005)
- * Offseason or practice squad member only

Buck Rasmussen (born October 1, 1978) is an American former professional football defensive lineman of the National Football League (NFL).

Rasmussen played college football at the University of Nebraska Omaha.

On May 2, 2003, he signed with the New England Patriots as an undrafted free agent. On August 24, 2003, he was released by the Patriots. On February 6, 2004, he re-signed with the team.

On May 30, 2005, he signed with the Winnipeg Blue Bombers of the Canadian Football League (CFL).
