= Clint Stickdorn =

American football player (born 1982)

No. 74, 77
- Position: Offensive tackle

Personal information
- Born: 30 April 1982 (age 44); Toledo, Ohio, U.S.
- Listed height: 6 ft 5 in (1.96 m)
- Listed weight: 307 lb (139 kg)

Career information
- High school: Liberty Union (Baltimore, Ohio)
- College: Cincinnati
- NFL draft: 2005: undrafted

Career history
- Cleveland Browns (2005)*; Indianapolis Colts (2005)*; Detroit Lions (2005–2006); Amsterdam Admirals (2006); BC Lions (2008)*
- * Offseason or practice squad member only

Awards and highlights
- Third-team All-Conference USA (2004)

Career NFL statistics
- Games played: 1
- Games started: 0
- Stats at Pro Football Reference

Clint J. Stickdorn (born April 30, 1982) is an American former professional football player who was an offensive tackle for one season with the Detroit Lions of the National Football League (NFL). He played college football for the Cincinnati Bearcats. He was also a member of the Cleveland Browns, Indianapolis Colts, Amsterdam Admirals and BC Lions.

== Early life and college ==
Stickdorn played high school football at Liberty Union High School in Baltimore, Ohio. He also played basketball in high school. In February 2000, he signed his National Letter of Intent with the Cincinnati Bearcats of the University of Cincinnati. He was recruited to Cincinnati to play tight end but ending up playing offensive tackle.

He was a four-year letterman for the Bearcats from 2001 to 2004. He was redshirted in 2000. He was a two-year starter at right tackle from 2003 to 2004, starting 8 games in 2003 and all 12 games in 2004. He earned Third-team All-Conference USA honors his senior year in 2004. He was also a 2004 winner of the Jim Kelly Award, which is "given annually to a student-athlete on offense and defense who best represent the ideals of former UC letterwinner, administrator and coach Jim Kelly, Sr". Stickdorn majored in marketing at Cincinnati. In December 2009, BearcatReport.com named Stickdorn Second-team on their Cincinnati All-Decade Team.

== Professional career ==
Pre-draft measurables
| Height | Weight | 40-yard dash | 20-yard shuttle | Three-cone drill | Vertical jump | Broad jump | Bench press |
|---|---|---|---|---|---|---|---|
| 6 ft 5 in (1.96 m) | 308 lb (140 kg) | 5.26 s | 4.62 s | 7.84 s | 26 in (0.66 m) | 8 ft 11 in (2.72 m) | 13 reps |
All values from Cincinnati Pro Day

Stickdorn was rated the 58th best offensive tackle in the 2005 NFL draft by NFLDraftScout.com.

He signed with the Cleveland Browns in early May 2005 after going undrafted. Stickdorn grew up a Browns fan. He was released by the Browns in late August 2005.

In September 2005, he was both signed to the Indianapolis Colts' practice squad and later released. In November 2005, he was re-signed to the Colts' practice squad and later released by the team.

He was then signed to the Detroit Lions' practice squad later in November. In January 2006, he signed a 2006 contract with the Lions. He was allocated to the Amsterdam Admirals of NFL Europe later in January. He played in 10 games for the Admirals during the 2006 season and helped the team advance to World Bowl XIV, where they lost to the Frankfurt Galaxy by a score of 22–7. He was released by the Lions in early September 2006, before the start of the regular season, and then signed to the team's practice squad shortly after. He was released by the team in October 2006. He was signed to the Lions' practice squad in December 2006 and promoted to the active roster later than month. On December 31 against the Dallas Cowboys, he played in his only career NFL game, in which the Lions beat the Cowboys by a score of 39–31. He received a game ball for his performance against the Cowboys. He was released by the Lions in September 2007, before the start of the regular season.

He signed with the BC Lions in March 2008. He was released by the team in June 2008, before the start of the regular season.
