= Drew Wahlroos =

American football player (1980–2017)

No. 58
- Position: Linebacker

Personal information
- Born: June 7, 1980; Poway, California, U.S.
- Died: September 2, 2017 (aged 37); San Diego, California, U.S.
- Listed height: 6 ft 3 in (1.91 m)
- Listed weight: 230 lb (104 kg)

Career information
- High school: Poway (CA)
- College: Colorado
- NFL draft: 2003: undrafted

Career history
- Philadelphia Eagles (2003)*; → Amsterdam Admirals (2003–2004); Tennessee Titans (2004)*; St. Louis Rams (2004–2005)
- * Offseason or practice squad member only

Career NFL statistics
- Total tackles: 17
- Stats at Pro Football Reference

Drew Edward Wahlroos (June 7, 1980 – September 2, 2017) was an American professional football linebacker. He played in the National Football League (NFL) for the St. Louis Rams in 2004 and 2005. In two seasons with the Rams, Wahlross appeared in 21 games, mostly on special teams.

Wahlroos played high school football at Poway High School from 1996 to 1997. He played college football at the University of Colorado from 1999 to 2002. In November 2001, Wahlroos accused five Nebraska fans of attacking him outside a bar after Colorado defeated Nebraska 62–36. Wahlroos suffered a broken nose and black eye and said, "I was at the wrong place at the wrong time." In December 2002, Wahlroos was arrested in San Antonio, Texas, and charged with public intoxication prior to Colorado's appearance in the Alamo Bowl. Wahlroos offered a public apology for his conduct and was permitted to play in the Alamo Bowl.

He played for the Amsterdam Admirals in the NFL Europe during the 2003 season. In August 2006, Wahlroos was placed on injured reserve and subsequently released by the Rams with an injury settlement after suffering a broken hand.

On September 7, 2017, it was reported that Wahlroos had died of a self-inflicted gunshot wound on September 2 at the age of 37, and that his death had been ruled a suicide by the San Diego Medical Examiner's Office.
