= Ruvell Martin =

American football player and coach (born 1982)

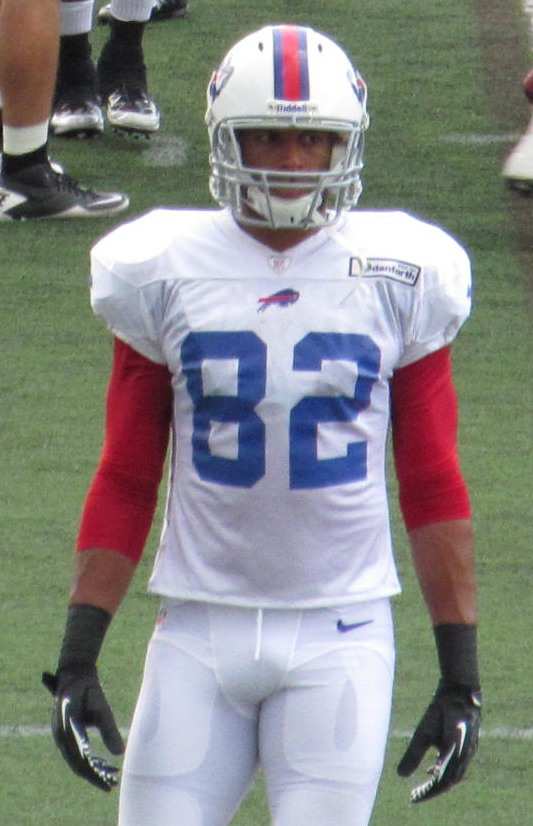
- Martin at Bills training camp in 2012

No. 82, 83, 18
- Position: Wide receiver

Personal information
- Born: August 10, 1982 (age 44); Muskegon, Michigan, U.S.
- Listed height: 6 ft 4 in (1.93 m)
- Listed weight: 214 lb (97 kg)

Career information
- High school: Catholic (Muskegon)
- College: Saginaw Valley State
- NFL draft: 2004: undrafted

Career history

Playing
- San Diego Chargers (2004)*; Amsterdam Admirals (2005); San Diego Chargers (2005)*; Green Bay Packers (2005−2008); St. Louis Rams (2009); Seattle Seahawks (2010); Buffalo Bills (2011−2012)
- * Offseason or practice squad member only

Coaching
- Green Bay Packers (2020–2021) Minority Coaching Fellowship

Awards and highlights
- All-NFL Europe (2005); World Bowl champion (XIII)

Career NFL statistics
- Receptions: 76
- Receiving yards: 1,129
- Receiving touchdowns: 7
- Stats at Pro Football Reference

Ruvell Martin (born August 10, 1982) is an American former professional football player who was a wide receiver in the National Football League (NFL). He played college football for the Saginaw Valley State Cardinals and was signed as an undrafted free agent by the San Diego Chargers in 2004. Martin was also a member of the Amsterdam Admirals, Green Bay Packers, St. Louis Rams, Seattle Seahawks, and the Buffalo Bills.

== Early life ==
Martin graduated from Muskegon Catholic Central High School in 2000, where he played football and basketball. He was inducted into the Muskegon Area Sports Hall of Fame in 2019.

== College career ==
Martin played college football at Saginaw Valley State. His junior season was highlighted by a three-touchdown game against Northern Michigan. As a senior, he was a first team All-Great Lakes Intercollegiate Athletic Conference selection.

== Professional career ==
=== San Diego Chargers ===
Martin was signed by the San Diego Chargers as an undrafted free agent in 2004, but was waived before the season began.

==== Amsterdam Admirals ====
He re-signed with the team in the following offseason and was allocated to the Amsterdam Admirals of NFL Europe. He was waived again by the Chargers before the 2005 season. Martin earned All-NFL Europe honors after leading the league with 679 receiving yards and twelve touchdowns for the 2005 World Bowl champion Admirals.

=== Green Bay Packers ===
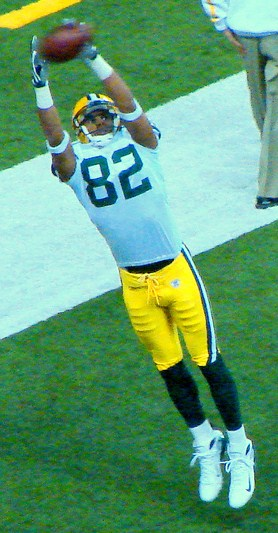
Martin catches a touchdown pass in 2007.

Martin was signed to the practice squad of the Green Bay Packers in November 2005. He stayed with the team in 2006, starting three games and catching his first career touchdown.

On November 10, 2007, Martin had two touchdowns - his first multiple-TD game of his two-year career - in a 34–0 victory over the Minnesota Vikings. He finished the game with four catches for 57 yards.

He was considered the third-string quarterback on the Packers behind Brett Favre and Aaron Rodgers due to his experience playing the position, but that title was removed after the Packers signed Craig Nall to be their third quarterback.

On September 5, 2009, Martin was released by the Packers in the roster cut downs.

=== St. Louis Rams ===
The St. Louis Rams signed Martin on September 15, 2009. After posting six catches for the Rams, the team did not offer him another contract.

=== Seattle Seahawks ===
Martin signed with the Seattle Seahawks on March 15, 2010. He was released on September 4, 2010, as the Seahawks made final cuts to set their 53-man roster. On November 3, 2010, Martin re-signed with the Seahawks.

=== Buffalo Bills ===
The Buffalo Bills signed Martin on August 24, 2011. He was released during final cuts, but was re-signed early in the season. A late-season hamstring injury hampered his season.

Martin was re-signed by the Bills on March 7, 2012. He was released during final cuts but re-signed quickly after. He suffered an injury that kept him out of at least one game in the season.

== Personal and post-retirement life ==
Martin met his wife Michelle in college; the couple has four children. After his playing career ended, Martin worked as a realtor in Fort Mill, South Carolina. In 2020, former college teammate Matt LaFleur hired Martin in a minority coaching fellowship role with the Packers. After the 2021 season, Martin left the team.
