= Bart Andrus =

American football player and coach (born 1958)

Firenze Red Lions
- Title: Head coach

Personal information
- Born: March 30, 1958 (age 68); Logan, Utah, U.S.

Career information
- High school: Monroe (North Hills, California)
- College: Los Angeles Valley (1976); Canyons (1977); Oregon State (1978); Montana (1979–1980)
- NFL draft: 1981: undrafted

Career history

Coaching
- St. Patrick HS (CA) (1981–1983) Head coach; BYU (1984–1985) Graduate assistant); Humboldt State (1986–1989) Offensive coordinator; Montana State (1990–1991) Offensive coordinator; Southern Utah (1993–1995) Offensive coordinator; Rocky Mountain (1996) Head coach; Tennessee Oilers (1997) Offensive assistant / Quality control; Tennessee Oilers (1998) Offensive assistant / Quarterbacks; Tennessee Titans (1999) Quarterbacks; Rhein Fire (2000) Offensive coordinator / Quarterbacks; Amsterdam Admirals (2001–2007) Head coach; Tennessee Titans (2008) Offensive assistant; Toronto Argonauts (2009) Head coach; Omaha Nighthawks (2011) Offensive coordinator; Omaha Nighthawks (2012) Head coach; St. Louis Rams (2013) Offensive assistant; Feather River (2014) Head coach; The Spring League (2018–2019) Head coach; Team 9 (2020) Head coach; TSL Generals (2020) Head coach; Ottawa Gee-Gees (2021) Quarterbacks; Philadelphia Stars (2022–2023) Head coach; Frankfurt Galaxy (2025) Head coach; Firenze Red Lions (2026–present) Head coach

Operations
- Philadelphia Stars (2022) General manager

Awards and highlights
- Big Sky All-Academic (1980); NAIA Division I Coach of the Year (1996); NFLE Coach of the Year (2005); World Bowl XIII champion (2005)

Head coaching record
- Regular season: USFL: 10–10 (.500)
- Postseason: NFLE: 1–1 (.500); USFL: 1–1 (.500)
- Career: NCAA: 6–4 (.600); NJCAA: 2–8 (.200); NFLE: 34–36 (.486); CFL: 3–15 (.167); UFL: 2–2 (.500); USFL: 10–10 (.500)

Bart Andrus (born March 30, 1958) is an American football coach and a former collegiate player. He has served as head coach for the Amsterdam Admirals of the NFL Europe League (NFLEL) from 2001 to 2007, the Toronto Argonauts of the Canadian Football League (CFL) in 2009, and the Omaha Nighthawks of the United Football League (UFL) in 2012 compiling a career record of 40 wins and 54 losses. Andrus also was the head football coach at Rocky Mountain College in 1996, posting a mark of 6–4. He also served as head coach of the Generals of The Spring League and the Philadelphia Stars.

== Early life and playing career ==
Andrus was born in Logan, Utah and grew up in Sepulveda, California (now called North Hills), a community in the San Fernando Valley of the city of Los Angeles. While attending Monroe High School, he played quarterback on the football team, earning first-team All-Mid-Valley League honors his senior year in 1975. Following graduation, Andrus played two years of junior college football. He originally enrolled at Los Angeles Valley College in 1976, before transferring to the College of the Canyons in Santa Clarita, California the next year. In 1978, Andrus moved on to Oregon State University in Corvallis. After not seeing any playing time with the Beavers that year, he transferred to the University of Montana. During his first season in Missoula, he played in a backup role, completing three of 16 passes for 18 yards while also rushing 14 times for 83 yards. As a senior in 1980, Andrus shared starting quarterback duties with future Detroit Lions head coach Marty Mornhinweg. He completed 69 of 118 attempts for 688 yards and also punted 61 times for a 40.0-yard average. At the conclusion of the season, Andrus was selected to the Big Sky Conference All-Academic team.

== Coaching career ==
One of Andrus' earliest experiences with coaching was when he served for three years as head coach at St. Patrick High School in Vallejo, California. After this, in 1984, he went to work as graduate assistant at Brigham Young University, followed by serving as offensive coordinator at three different schools: Humboldt State (1986–1989), Montana State (1990–1991) and Southern Utah University (1993–1995).

After this Andrus continued his coaching career (which has extended to nearly three decades as of 2012) and advanced to head coaching at the collegiate level when he served as head coach at Rocky Mountain College for one season in 1996. For this he received the 1996 National Association of Intercollegiate Athletics (NAIA) Coach of the Year Award because of his efforts in restructuring a struggling program that had not won a game in four years. With Andrus at the helm, Rocky Mountain ended the season at 6–4 with their offense ranking first in the nation.

Andrus moved on to spend three seasons in the NFL with the Tennessee Oilers as an offensive assistant from 1997 to 1998 and as the quarterbacks coach (tutoring NFL star Steve McNair) in 1999 when the team had been renamed the Tennessee Titans. He was a member of the Titans' coaching staff during Super Bowl XXXIV following the 1999 NFL season.

In the new millennium, Andrus moved his career to Europe, when he took the position as offensive coordinator for the NFL Europe team Rhein Fire, located in Düsseldorf, Germany. Here he won his first World Bowl ring with his new team. The Fire's offense topped the league in total yards gained and total points scored that year with Andrus as offensive coordinator.

One year later, Bart Andrus switched to the NFLE team the Amsterdam Admirals when the position of head coach became available there. During this year Andrus lead the Admirals to a 4–6 season, missing out on clinching a berth in World Bowl IX with a loss in week 10 (the final week). Three years later, in 2004, Andrus guided the Admirals to their first non-losing season since 1998 by establishing a 5–5 record.

Probably due to his own history as quarterback and later on as quarterback coach, Andrus traditionally provided the Admirals with strong offensive teams. This is shown by the fact that the Admirals ranked number one in total offense in 2005, averaging 357.4 yards per game. After posting a 6–4 mark that year and leading his team to victory for the first time in World Bowl XIII against the three-time World Bowl champion Berlin Thunder, he was named NFL Europe Coach of the Year and earned his second World Bowl ring. While guiding the Admirals to a league-best 7–3 regular season record in 2006, Andrus was once again coaching one of NFL Europe's most potent offenses, with his men averaging 332.3 yards per game. However, his team did not manage to deliver him his third World Bowl ring after he lost his starting quarterback.

On January 20, 2006, the Atlanta Falcons interviewed Andrus for their vacancy at quarterback coach but Andrus continued as head coach for the Admirals in 2006. Georgia Tech also interviewed Andrus in 2007 but he decided to stay with the Admirals another season, which was to prove to be the final season of NFL Europe.

On July 27, 2008, the Tennessee Titans again added Bart Andrus to their coaching staff as an offensive assistant coach.

On January 16, 2009, the Toronto Argonauts of the Canadian Football League announced that Andrus had been hired as head coach. He was the 53rd head coach in the team's 136-year history and this was his first experience in Canadian football. In his sole season as the Argonauts head coach, the team finished last in the CFL with a 3–15 record. On December 14, 2009, it was announced that the Toronto Argonauts fired Andrus as head coach.

On January 18, 2011, Andrus was announced as the new offensive coordinator for the Omaha Nighthawks of the UFL, serving under Joe Moglia, former president and CEO of the financial firm holding the team's home field's naming rights, TD Ameritrade. After the 2011 season Moglia and several other members of his staff, but not Andrus, departed the UFL for the collegiate ranks at Coastal Carolina, which named Moglia its new head coach. On August 9, 2012, Andrus was officially announced as the new head coach of the Nighthawks.

For the 2013 season, the St. Louis Rams added Bart Andrus to their coaching staff as an offensive assistant coach.

On May 7, 2014, Andrus agreed to become the temporary head coach for one season with the Feather River College Golden Eagles.

On January 24, 2020, Andrus was revealed as the head coach of Team Nine, the centralized farm team being utilized by the XFL. He was named head coach of the Generals of The Spring League on October 15, 2020.

Andrus joined the Ottawa Gee-Gees of U Sports football in 2021 to serve as the team's quarterbacks coach.

On January 6, 2022, Andrus was revealed as the Head coach and General manager of the Philadelphia Stars. On January 1, 2024, it was announced the Stars would not be a part of the UFL Merger.

On October 27, 2024, it was announced that Andrus had been hired as the head coach for the Frankfurt Galaxy.

== Personal life ==
Andrus has two children, daughter Brooke, and son Travis.

== Head coaching record ==
=== College ===
Year	Team	Overall	Conference	Standing	Bowl/playoffs
Rocky Mountain Battlin' Bears (Frontier Conference) (1996)
1996	Rocky Mountain	6–4	3–3	T–2nd	
Rocky Mountain:		6–4	3–3		
Total:		6–4			

=== Junior college ===
Year	Team	Overall	Conference	Standing	Bowl/playoffs
Feather River Golden Eagles (National NorCal League) (2014)
2014	Feather River	2–8	0–5	6th	
Feather River:		2–8	0–5		
Total:		2–8			

=== Professional ===
League	Team	Year	Regular season					Postseason			
League	Team	Year	Won	Lost	Tied	Win %	Finish	Won	Lost	Win %	Result
NFLE	AMS	2001	4	6	0	.400	5th (League)	–	–	—	—
NFLE	AMS	2002	4	6	0	.400	5th (League)	–	–	—	—
NFLE	AMS	2003	4	6	0	.400	5th (League)	–	–	—	—
NFLE	AMS	2004	5	5	0	.500	3rd (League)	–	–	—	—
NFLE	AMS	2005	6	4	0	.600	2nd (League)	1	0	1.000	World Bowl XIII champions
NFLE	AMS	2006	7	3	0	.700	1st (League)	0	1	.000	Lost to Frankfurt Galaxy in World Bowl XIV
NFLE	AMS	2007	4	6	0	.400	5th (League)	–	–	—	—
AMS total			34	36		.486	1	1	1	.500	1 World Bowl
CFL	TOR	2009	3	15	0	.167	4th (East Division)	–	–	—	—
UFL	OMA	2012	2	2	0	.500	2nd (League)	–	–	—	—
USFL	PHI	2022	6	4	0	.600	2nd (North Division)	1	1	.500	Lost to Birmingham Stallions in USFL Championship Game
USFL	PHI	2023	4	6	0	.400	3rd (North Division)				
Total			46	58		.442		2	2	.500	—
