= Claude Harriott =

American gridiron football player (born 1981)

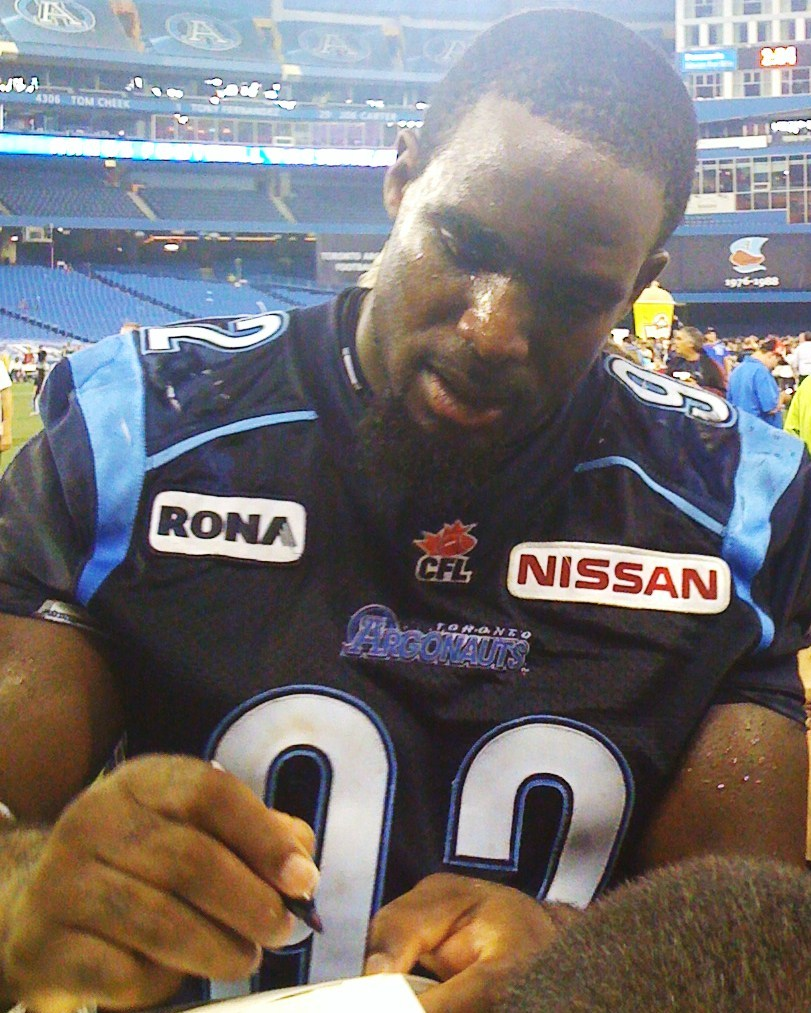
- Harriot while with the Toronto Argonauts in 2009

No. 93, 92, 70
- Position: Defensive end

Personal information
- Born: April 8, 1981 (age 45); Westmoreland, Jamaica
- Listed height: 6 ft 3 in (1.91 m)
- Listed weight: 260 lb (118 kg)

Career information
- High school: Glades Central (Belle Glade, Florida, U.S.)
- College: Pittsburgh
- NFL draft: 2004: 5th round, 147th overall pick

Career history
- Chicago Bears (2004)*; New York Giants (2004–2005)*; Detroit Lions (2006); → Amsterdam Admirals (2006); Kansas City Chiefs (2007)*; Detroit Lions (2007–2008)*; Toronto Argonauts (2008–2009); Omaha Nighthawks (2011–2012)
- * Offseason or practice squad member only

Awards and highlights
- All-Big East (2002)

Claude Harriott (born April 8, 1981) is a Jamaican-American former professional football defensive end.

== Early life ==
Harriott played high school football at Glades Central Community High School in Belle Glade, Florida. He played college football at Pittsburgh.

== Professional career ==
Harriott began his career in the National Football League by being selected by the Chicago Bears in the fifth round of the 2004 NFL draft. He did not make the roster, being released in the final cut.

In January 2005, he signed with the New York Giants but was released that April.

Claude was drafted in the first round to the Amsterdam Admirals of NFL Europa in January 2006 NFL Europe Draft. He appeared in World Bowl XIV.In June 2006, Harriott signed with the Detroit Lions. He arrived in Detroit, he attended training camp but again was released in the final cut. He was signed to the [(practice squad)] and to the active roster in December but did not play.

Being released by the Lions in September 2007, he signed to the practice squad of the Kansas City Chiefs where he remained until December.

Harriott then re-signed with Detroit. In 2008, he attended training camp with the Lions but was again released in the final cut.

On September 15, 2008, Harriott signed a practice roster agreement with the Toronto Argonauts of the Canadian Football League and joined the active roster on September 20. His performance in the seven final games of the season with 20 defensive tackles, 2 sacks, 1 forced fumble, 3 tackles for a loss, and 1 pass knockdown impressed the Argos enough to extend his contract through the 2010 CFL season. On May 27, 2010, the Argonauts released him, stating his knee injury as the primary reason.

Harriott was signed by the Omaha Nighthawks on June 10, 2011. He played with them until the United Football League folded in the middle of the 2012 season.
