= Nick Hannah =

American gridiron football player (born 1981)

No. 44
- Position: Linebacker

Personal information
- Born: March 10, 1981 (age 45); East Wenatchee, Washington, U.S.
- Listed height: 6 ft 1 in (1.85 m)
- Listed weight: 220 lb (100 kg)

Career information
- High school: Eastmont (WA)
- College: Eastern Oregon
- NFL draft: 2005: undrafted

Career history
- Tri-Cities Fever (2005); Indianapolis Colts (2005–2006)*; → Amsterdam Admirals (2006); BC Lions (2007); Arizona Adrenaline (2008); Toronto Argonauts (2009)*; California Redwoods (2009)
- * Offseason or practice squad member only

Awards and highlights
- AIFA Western All-Star (2008)
- Stats at CFL.ca (archive)

Nick Hannah (born March 10, 1981) is an American former football linebacker. He was signed by the Indianapolis Colts as an undrafted free agent in 2005. He played college football at Eastern Oregon.

Hannah was also a member of the Tri-Cities Fever, Amsterdam Admirals, BC Lions, Arizona Adrenaline, Toronto Argonauts, and California Redwoods.
