= Carl-Johan Björk =

Swedish gridiron football player (born 1982)

No. 50, 48, 47
- Position: Linebacker

Personal information
- Born: February 26, 1982 (age 44); Stockholm, Sweden
- Listed height: 6 ft 0 in (1.83 m)
- Listed weight: 250 lb (113 kg)

Career information
- College: None

Career history
- Täby Flyers (1995–2001); Stockholm Mean Machines (2002–2005); Amsterdam Admirals (2005–2007); Dallas Cowboys (2006)*; Green Bay Packers (2007)*; Cincinnati Bengals (2008)*; Kiel Baltic Hurricanes (2009)
- * Offseason or practice squad member only

Awards and highlights
- 2× Swedish National Champion (2002, 2004); 2× Nordic Champion (2002, 2004); 2004 Voted Best Linebacker in Sweden; 2004 Voted MVP for entire Swedish Superseries league; 2005 European Champion with Swedish National team; 2005 MVP with Swedish National team; World Bowl champion (XIII)

Carl-Johan Björk (born February 26, 1982) is a Swedish former American football linebacker in NFL Europe for the Amsterdam Admirals. He also was a member of the Dallas Cowboys, Green Bay Packers and Cincinnati Bengals in the National Football League.

== Early life ==
Björk played with Team Europe, which was a squad of top junior players from Europe, that was put together to compete against high school All-star teams from the United States, Canada, Mexico and Japan. He was a member of the Swedish National team and was also a two-time Nordic champion.

He was a three-time Swedish champion with the Stockholm Mean Machines. In 2004, he was named the MVP in the Swedish league.

== Professional career ==
=== Amsterdam Admirals (NFLEL) ===
In 2005, Björk was signed by the Amsterdam Admirals of NFL Europe, with nine years of previous amateur American football experience. He was a backup linebacker, posting 27 tackles, one forced fumble and a fumble recovery.

In 2006, he started 10 games, registering 47 tackles and one interception. On April 10, he received National Player of the Week honors, after making 6 tackles and one interception against the Berlin Thunder.

In 2007, he returned to play for the Admirals and was a starter at linebacker.

=== Dallas Cowboys ===
On June 15, 2006, he was allocated by the league to the Dallas Cowboys, as part of the NFL International Development Practice Squad Program. At the time, the best international players with previous NFL Europe League experience, were allotted to some NFL teams every year on a rotating basis, with clubs acquiring one player per roster. These players were exempted by the league from counting on the preseason roster, as well as on the practice squad during the regular season. He wasn't re-signed after the season.

=== Green Bay Packers ===
On July 9, 2007, he was allocated by the NFL to the Green Bay Packers to join the team's practice squad. He wasn't re-signed after the season.

=== Cincinnati Bengals ===
On July 15, 2008, he was allocated by the league to the Cincinnati Bengals to join the team's practice squad. He wasn't re-signed after the season.

== Personal life ==
Björk served as an in studio host/analyst for NFL broadcasts on Sweden's Viasat coverage of American football carried on TV3 Sport.
