= James Lee (defensive tackle) =

American football player (1980–2016)

- Lee with the Green Bay Packers in 2004

No. 64, 91
- Position: Defensive tackle

Personal information
- Born: March 12, 1980; Salem, Oregon, U.S.
- Died: June 24, 2016 (aged 36); Eureka, California, U.S.
- Listed height: 6 ft 5 in (1.96 m)
- Listed weight: 325 lb (147 kg)

Career information
- High school: Salem (OR) McKay
- College: Oregon State
- NFL draft: 2003: 5th round, 147th overall pick

Career history
- Green Bay Packers (2003–2004); Amsterdam Admirals (2006)
- Stats at Pro Football Reference

James Franklin Lee (March 12, 1980 – June 24, 2016) was an American professional football defensive tackle who played for the Green Bay Packers of the National Football League (NFL). He was selected by the Packers in the fifth round of the 2003 NFL draft. Lee played college football at College of the Redwoods, a junior college in Eureka, California, and Oregon State.

== Early life ==
Lee played high school football at Douglas McKay High School in Salem, Oregon, graduating in 1998. He was a two-year starter at defensive tackle, and earned All-Valley League and all-region honors his senior year. He also played in the Oregon Bowl All-Star game in summer 1998 and was named the defensive lineman of the game. Lee participated in the shot put and discus in high school as part of the track and field team.

== College career ==
Lee first played college football at the College of the Redwoods. He played in 10 games his sophomore year, recording 34 solo tackles, seven sacks, two forced fumbles, two fumble recoveries, and two blocked kicks, garnering J.C. Grid-Wire second-team All-American recognition. He also earned first-team all-league honors his freshman season.

Lee transferred to play for the Oregon State Beavers from 2001 to 2002 and was a backup defensive tackle both years. He appeared in 10 games in 2001, accumulating nine tackles. He appeared in 13 games in 2002, totaling, 29 tackles (19 solo), one forced fumble, one fumble recovery and three pass breakups.

== Professional career ==
Lee was selected by the Green Bay Packers in the fifth round, with the 147th overall pick, of the 2003 NFL draft. He officially signed with the team on June 4, 2003. He was placed on injured reserve on August 26, 2003. Lee played in nine games, starting one, for the Packers in 2004, recording seven solo tackles, two assisted tackles and one sack. He was placed on injured reserve on December 23, 2004. He was waived by the Packers on September 3, 2005.

Lee played in four games, starting one, for the Amsterdam Admirals of NFL Europe in 2006, totaling nine tackles.

== Personal life ==
On June 24, 2016, Lee died from complications from diabetes at the age of 36.
