= Ron Heller (offensive tackle) =

American football player and coach (born 1962)

No. 73
- Position: Offensive tackle

Personal information
- Born: August 25, 1962 (age 64); East Meadow, New York, U.S.
- Listed height: 6 ft 6 in (1.98 m)
- Listed weight: 290 lb (132 kg)

Career information
- High school: Farmingdale (South Farmingdale, New York)
- College: Penn State
- NFL draft: 1984: 4th round, 112th overall pick

Career history

Playing
- Tampa Bay Buccaneers (1984–1987); Philadelphia Eagles (1988–1992); Miami Dolphins (1993–1995)

Coaching
- Amsterdam Admirals (2004) (Assistant offensive line & tight ends coach); Amsterdam Admirals (2006) (Offensive line coach); Amsterdam Admirals (2007) (Offensive coordinator & offensive line coach); Toronto Argonauts (2009) (Offensive line coach); Jacksonville Jaguars (2010–2011) (Offensive staff assistant); Omaha Nighthawks (2012) (Offensive line coach); New York Jets (2013–2015) (Assistant offensive line coach)

Awards and highlights
- PFWA All-Rookie Team (1984); National champion (1982)

Career NFL statistics
- Games played: 172
- Games started: 166
- Fumble recoveries: 7
- Stats at Pro Football Reference

Ronald Ramon Heller (born August 25, 1962) is an American football coach and former offensive tackle, who played twelve seasons in the National Football League (NFL) for the Tampa Bay Buccaneers, Philadelphia Eagles and Miami Dolphins. Heller is the former assistant offensive line coach for the New York Jets of the NFL, a position he assumed in February 2013 to January 2016.

== Playing career ==
As a football player, Heller, a graduate of Penn State was chosen by the Tampa Bay Buccaneers in the fourth round of the 1984 NFL draft, where he played offensive tackle. He was traded to the Seattle Seahawks who in turn traded him to the Philadelphia Eagles for a fourth round draft pick.

The 6-foot-6, 290-pound Heller started all but one game for the Eagles at right tackle in 1988. Overall, he played in 75 regular season contests for Philadelphia, at both right and left tackle. After missing one game in his first season with the team, he didn't miss another until he was sidelined for four games in 1992 due to a foot injury. Following the 1992 season, Heller signed with the Miami Dolphins and played three seasons with them before a knee injury forced him to retire.

== Coaching career ==
Heller gained his first NFL coaching experience in 2004 as a season-long intern coach with the Amsterdam Admirals in NFL Europe. He became the Admirals' offensive line coach in 2006 under head coach Bart Andrus, and was promoted to offensive coordinator in 2007.

Heller rejoined Andrus on the staff of the Toronto Argonauts, January 23, 2009, when he was hired as the team's offensive line coach.

In February 2010, Heller was hired by the Jacksonville Jaguars as an offensive staff assistant.
