= Norman LeJeune =

American football player (born 1980)

No. 42, 27
- Position: Safety

Personal information
- Born: May 10, 1980 (age 46); Baton Rouge, Louisiana, U.S.
- Listed height: 6 ft 0 in (1.83 m)
- Listed weight: 210 lb (95 kg)

Career information
- High school: Brusly (LA)
- College: LSU
- NFL draft: 2003: 7th round, 244th overall pick

Career history
- Philadelphia Eagles (2003); Tennessee Titans (2004–2005)*; Amsterdam Admirals (2005); Miami Dolphins (2005–2006); Indianapolis Colts (2007)*; New Orleans VooDoo (2008); California Redwoods (2009)
- * Offseason or practice squad member only

Awards and highlights
- Second-team All-Arena (2008)

Career NFL statistics
- Total tackles: 2
- Stats at Pro Football Reference
- Stats at ArenaFan.com

Norman LeJeune Jr. (born May 10, 1980) is an American former professional football player who was a safety in the National Football League (NFL). He was selected by the Philadelphia Eagles in the seventh round of the 2003 NFL draft. He played college football for the LSU Tigers.

LeJeune was also a member of the Tennessee Titans, Amsterdam Admirals, Miami Dolphins, Indianapolis Colts, New Orleans VooDoo, and California Redwoods.

== Early life ==
LeJeune attended Brusly High School in Brusly, Louisiana and was the state's Class 3A leading rusher as a senior with 1,609 yards and 27 touchdowns.

== College career ==
LeJeune played college football at Louisiana State University for four years (1999–2002). In his first year played 11 games with one start at linebacker. He recorded 41 tackles, 26 assists and two interceptions and earned SEC All-Freshman honors. In his sophomore year, LeJeune played 12 games at free safety and made 71 tackles with six assists. As a junior, he split time playing safety and cornerback and had 44 tackles and 18 assists in ten games. He started 13 games playing strong safety as a senior and posted 70 tackles, 37 assists and five sacks.

== Professional career ==
=== Philadelphia Eagles ===
LeJeune was selected in the seventh round (244th overall) of the 2003 NFL draft by the Philadelphia Eagles, but was waived by the team on August 31 and signed to the practice squad on September 1. He was activated to the 53-man roster on December 23, but was then inactive for the season finale at Washington (December 27) and both playoff games.

LeJeune was released by the Eagles on August 31, 2004.

=== Tennessee Titans ===
LeJeune was signed to the Tennessee Titans' practice squad on November 26, where he spent the final five weeks of the season.

In the 2005 offseason, LeJeune was allocated to NFL Europe and played for the Amsterdam Admirals. He earned the league's Defensive Player of the Week award in week four of the season, having recorded seven tackles, three passes defended, and two interceptions in the Admirals' 37–24 victory over the Cologne Centurions. He recorded 36 tackles and three interceptions in helping Amsterdam to the World Bowl XIII title. LeJeune made the final play by batting down a Dave Ragone pass in the endzone to secure Amsterdam's first and only World Bowl title.

LeJeune was released by the Titans on September 4, 2005.

=== Miami Dolphins ===
LeJeune and was signed as a free agent by the Miami Dolphins on October 25, 2005. He played in five games and recorded one tackle for the team that season.

LeJeune was waived by the Dolphins on August 29, 2006. He was re-signed to the team's practice squad on October 18, but released on October 24. He re-signed again to the practice squad on October 30 and was promoted to the active roster on November 22. LeJeune played at Detroit and recorded one tackle on November 23. He was released on December 2 and signed to the practice squad on December 6. He was activated again on December 26 and played in the season finale at Indianapolis on December 31. LeJeune had a total of one tackle in two games played.

The following offseason, LeJeune was released by the Dolphins on February 14, 2007.

=== Indianapolis Colts ===
LeJeune was signed by the Indianapolis Colts on July 13, 2007. He was waived on August 28.

=== New Orleans VooDoo ===
LeJeune was signed by the New Orleans Voodoo of the Arena Football League in 2008. He recorded 74 tackles, one sack, one forced fumble, one fumble recovery, six interceptions and three touchdowns on the season. He was released from his contract when the league folded in 2009.

=== California Redwoods ===
LeJeune was signed by the California Redwoods of the United Football League on August 18, 2009. He was placed on injured reserve on October 19, 2009.
