= Francesco Biancamano =

Italian gridiron football player (born 1976)

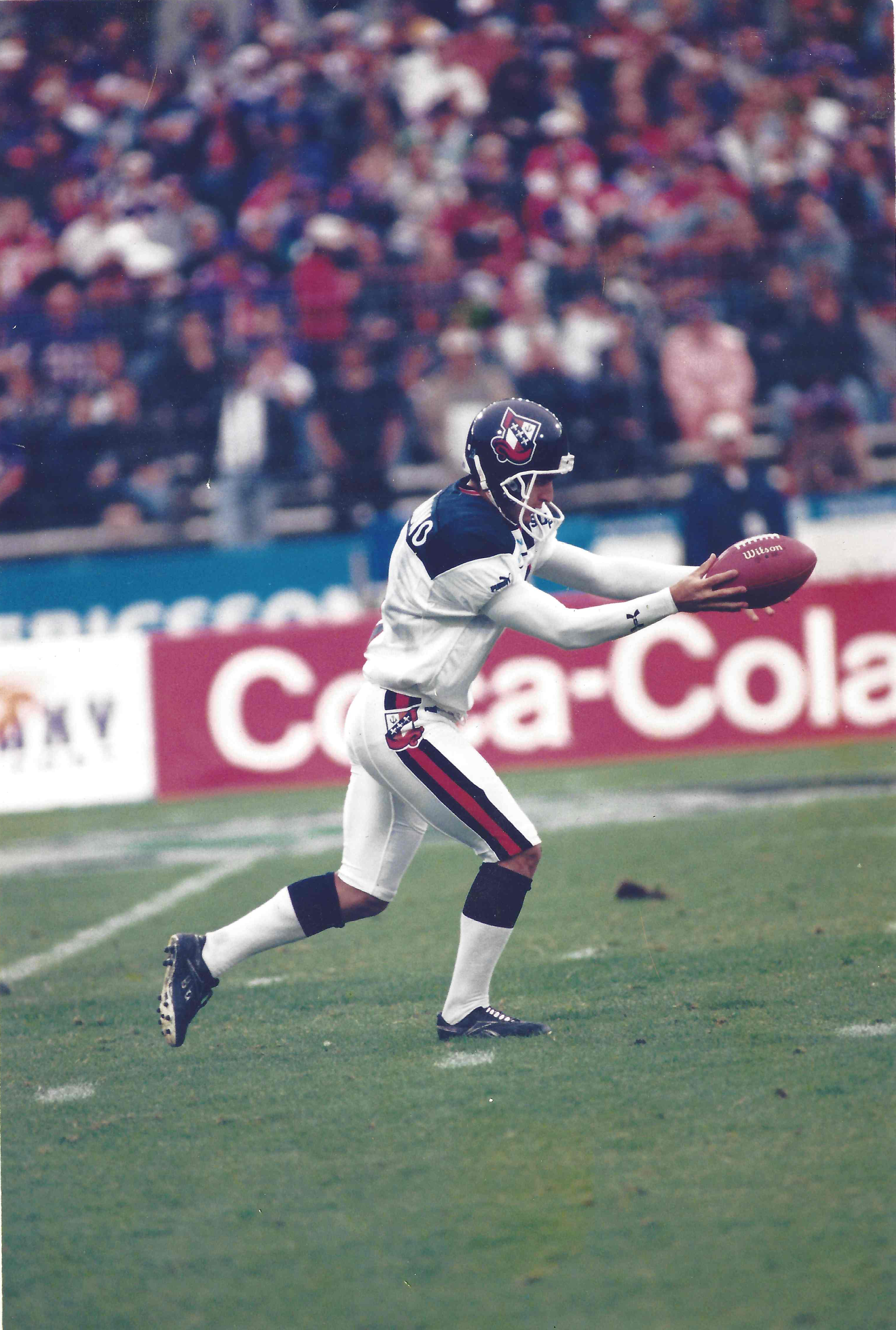

No. 9
- Positions: Placekicker, Punter

Personal information
- Born: March 12, 1976 (age 50); Sassano, Italy
- Listed height: 5 ft 9 in (1.75 m)

Career information
- High school: Walt Whitman (Huntington Station, New York)
- College: Southern Connecticut State

Career history
- Amsterdam Admirals; NY Giants; Denver Broncos; Dallas Cowboys; Cleveland Browns; San Francisco Demons; AFL2

Awards and highlights
- All-Northeast 10 (1997) (P/PK); 2× All-New England Division II (P); Preseason All-American Punter Division II (P); ECAC Division II Honoree (P/K)

Francesco Biancamano (born March 12, 1976) is an Italian former professional American football player.

== Early life ==
Biancamano, the son of Vincenzo and Vincenza Biancamano, immigrants from Sassano, Italy, arrived in the United States in the late 1970s. Growing up in Huntington Station, New York, Biancamano didn't start playing football until his sophomore year and track and field until his senior year for Walt Whitman High School. He played wide receiver, corner back, punter, and placekicker on the football team and averaged over 40 yards per kick. Biancamano received multiple offers from Division I, IAA, and II universities to play football and run track.

Biancamano attended Southern Connecticut State University (SCSU), where he majored in sports medicine and exercise physiology. A four-year starter for the Southern Connecticut Owls as a kicker/punter and a 4-year long/triple jumper, Biancamano holds multiple school records in football and track and field.

== Professional career ==
After college, Biancamano played in the National Football League (NFL) with the New York Giants, Denver Broncos, Dallas Cowboys, and the Cleveland Browns.

In 1999, Biancamano continued his professional career overseas, signing with the Amsterdam Admirals of NFL Europe. He played two seasons (1999–2000) with the Admirals, as placekicker and punter.

Following his time in NFL Europe, Biancamano was drafted into the XFL, and was selected 294th overall by the San Francisco Demons in the inaugural XFL Draft.

== Personal life ==
Biancamano resides on Long Island, New York, with his wife, two sons, and daughter. Biancamano is also the Inventor & Creator of The FOOTBALL STICK™
