= Jeff Roehl =

American football player (born 1980)

No. 61, 64, 73, 75
- Position: Offensive tackle

Personal information
- Born: May 18, 1980 (age 46); Evergreen Park, Illinois, U.S.
- Listed height: 6 ft 4 in (1.93 m)
- Listed weight: 303 lb (137 kg)

Career information
- High school: Carl Sandburg (Orland Park, Illinois)
- College: Northwestern
- NFL draft: 2003: undrafted

Career history
- New York Giants (2003); Seattle Seahawks (2004)*; New England Patriots (2005–2006)*; Amsterdam Admirals (2006); Philadelphia Eagles (2006)*; Kentucky Horsemen (2009); Chicago Rush (2010)
- * Offseason or practice squad member only

Awards and highlights
- Second-team All-Big Ten (2002)
- Stats at Pro Football Reference

Jeffrey Alan Roehl (born May 18, 1980) is a dance music DJ and producer based in Chicago, known by his stage name Xonic. In 2003, he was an American football offensive lineman for the New York Giants of the National Football League (NFL).

== High school football career ==
Roehl attended Carl Sandburg High School in Orland Park, Illinois. In 1997, the Roehl-led Eagles set the school record for both total yards in a season and total rushing yards in a season. Roehl was a two-year varsity starter and finished his career rated as the 98th best football prospect in the US by Tom Lemming of the Prep Football Report.

== College football career ==
Roehl originally attended the University of Notre Dame in 1998 on a full scholarship. After one season at Notre Dame, he transferred to Northwestern University and sat out the 1999 season due to NCAA transfer regulations. Beginning the following season, he was named a starter at offensive guard and began a streak of 35 consecutive starts which continued through his final game of eligibility in the 2002 season. The Northwestern Wildcats won the Big Ten Conference Championship and played in the Alamo Bowl in 2000 while he was a starter. Prior to the 2002 season, Roehl was rated as the No. 12 guard in the nation by the Sporting News. He was selected to play in the 2003 East-West Shrine Game in San Francisco, California. Roehl played under the late Randy Walker at Northwestern and cites Walker as one of his heroes. He graduated in 2003 with a degree in organizational communication with a minor in economics.

== Professional football career ==
An undrafted free agent out of Northwestern University, Roehl signed with the New York Giants. He earned a spot on the 53-man active roster at the start of the regular season. Roehl saw his first game action in the first quarter of the first game, substituting for Luke Petitgout at left tackle against the St. Louis Rams. He was named a starter for the Monday Night Football game versus the Dallas Cowboys on September 15, 2003. During the rest of the season, Roehl played in twelve games, starting one more. During the 2003 season, Roehl was featured on "Hey Rookie, Welcome to the NFL", an ESPN documentary profiling the life of a few select NFL first-year players.

During the 2004 offseason, the Giants made a coaching change from Jim Fassel to Tom Coughlin. This coaching change coincided with an injury for Roehl. Roehl went on to be claimed off the waiver wire by the Seattle Seahawks in 2004. In 2005, he spent most of the year on the roster of the New England Patriots and in 2006, he was a full-time starter in NFL Europa for the Amsterdam Admirals. After the 2006 NFL Europe season, Roehl briefly signed with the Philadelphia Eagles. In late June 2009, Roehl signed with the Kentucky Horsemen of the Arena Football 2 and was placed on the active roster in early July, starting at the offensive line position for the duration of the regular season and the playoffs. In 2010, Roehl signed with the Chicago Rush of Arena Football League.

== Football awards ==
=== High school ===
- 1996 All Conference (SICA Blue)
- 1996 All Area (Star Newspapers)
- 1997 National Football Foundation Scholar-Athlete
- 1997 IHSA Academic All-State
- 1997 Conference MVP (SICA Blue)
- 1997 All Conference (SICA Blue)
- 1997 All Area (Star Newspapers, Chicago Sun-Times)
- 1997 All State (H.S. Coaches, Chicago Tribune, Champaign News-Gazette)
- 1997 "Best of the Midwest" Team (Detroit Free Press)
- 1997 Third-team All America (Prep Football Report)

=== College ===
- 2000 Mid-Season All America (CNN/SI)
- 2000 Offensive Newcomer of the Year (NGN)
- 2001 Rashidi Wheeler Award
- 2002 2nd Team All Big Ten
- 2002 Carnig Minisian Citizenship Award

=== Professional ===
- 2006 First-team All-NFL Europe (Amsterdam Admirals)

== Producer career ==
DJ Xonic performed at Illinois State and Northern Illinois. He also performed multiple shows in Mexico City in 2012 and 2013, and headlined Lukrezia in Acapulco for New Years 2014.

Additionally, Xonic performed at the 2012 Bass City Oasis Festival alongside Lazy Rich and Hatiras, and played the official Bassnectar afterparty at Illinois State University. He has performed on the road with Na Palm and headlined the 2012 MODA fashion show at Union Station.
