= Cory Peoples =

American gridiron football player and coach (born 1981)

Current position
- Title: Defensive Pass Game Coordinator / Safeties
- Team: Liberty
- Conference: CUSA

Biographical details
- Born: July 23, 1981 (age 45); Bishopville, South Carolina, U.S.

Playing career
- 2001–2002: Georgia Military
- 2003–2004: South Carolina
- 2005–2007: Philadelphia Eagles
- 2006: Amsterdam Admirals
- 2007–2009: Toronto Argonauts
- Position: Safety

Coaching career (HC unless noted)
- 2008: Georgia Military (GA)
- 2009–2012: Clark Atlanta (ST/DB/RC)
- 2013: St. Augustine's (DB)
- 2014–2015: Charleston Southern (DB)
- 2016: South Carolina State (DB)
- 2017: Albany State (DC)
- 2018: Georgia Southern (CB)
- 2020–2023: Georgia State (CB)
- 2024–2025: Georgia Tech (DB)
- 2026–present: Liberty (DPGC/S)

Cory Peoples (born July 23, 1981) is a former professional American and Canadian football safety who is currently the defensive pass game coordinator & safeties coach at Liberty He was signed by the Philadelphia Eagles as an undrafted free agent in 2005. He played college football at South Carolina.

The Philadelphia Eagles announced, in 2012, that as part of the Bill Walsh Minority Coaching Fellowship, the team has hired six interns to the 2012 coaching staff. Correll Buckhalter, William Fuller, Don Holmes, Greg Lewis, Corey Peoples, and Montae Reagor will assist the Eagles staff throughout training camp and the preseason. Five of the six coaching interns spent time with the Eagles during their playing careers in the NFL. "The Bill Walsh Minority Coaching Fellowship is great for getting ex-NFL players and guys from college an opportunity to grow professionally and learn more about coaching," said Eagles wide receivers coach David Culley. Culley has been in charge of the hiring the coaching interns since he arrived in Philadelphia in 1999.

On February 19, 2018, Peoples was hired as the cornerbacks coach for the Georgia Southern Eagles football team. He worked under GS head coach Chad Lunsford.
