= Gibran Hamdan =

American gridiron football player (born 1981)

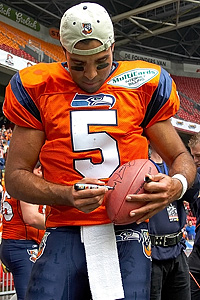
- Hamdan with the Amsterdam Admirals in 2006

No. 12, 2, 5
- Position: Quarterback

Personal information
- Born: February 8, 1981 (age 45); San Diego, California, U.S.
- Listed height: 6 ft 4 in (1.93 m)
- Listed weight: 220 lb (100 kg)

Career information
- High school: Bishop Denis J. O'Connell (Arlington, Virginia)
- College: Indiana (1998–2002)
- NFL draft: 2003: 7th round, 232nd overall pick

Career history

Playing
- Washington Redskins (2003); → Amsterdam Admirals (2004); Los Angeles Avengers (2005)*; Seattle Seahawks (2005–2006)*; → Amsterdam Admirals (2005–2006); San Francisco 49ers (2006)*; Seattle Seahawks (2006); Miami Dolphins (2007)*; Buffalo Bills (2007–2009); Toronto Argonauts (2010)*
- * Offseason or practice squad member only

Coaching
- Valparaiso (2024) Quarterbacks coach

Awards and highlights
- NFL Europe Offensive MVP (2006)

Career NFL statistics
- TD–INT: 0–0
- Passing yards: 7
- QB rating: 58.3
- Stats at Pro Football Reference

Gibran Latif Hamdan (born February 8, 1981) is an American former professional football player who was a quarterback in the National Football League (NFL) and NFL Europe. He was selected by the Washington Redskins in the seventh round of the 2003 NFL draft. He played college football for the Indiana Hoosiers. Hamdan was also a member of the Amsterdam Admirals, Los Angeles Avengers, Seattle Seahawks, San Francisco 49ers, Miami Dolphins, Buffalo Bills and Toronto Argonauts. He is the first person of Pakistani descent to play in the NFL.

== Early life ==
Hamdan's mother was a 16-year-old from Pakistan when she married his father, a nuclear engineer of Palestinian descent who attended the University of Illinois. He met her on a business trip. Hamdan was born in San Diego, but his family moved to Kuwait when he was three.

The family—which includes his younger brother, Bush—was on vacation back in San Diego when Iraq invaded Kuwait in 1991, destroying the family home and possessions. The Hamdans stayed in the U.S., and his mother took a job cutting hair until the family eventually settled in Potomac, Maryland.

Hamdan saw his first action at Winston Churchill High School in Potomac, MD, as a backup quarterback. After his sophomore year, Hamdan transferred to Bishop Denis J. O'Connell High School in Arlington, Virginia. As the football team's starting quarterback, he led the Northern Virginia area in passing yards, becoming Virginia Independent Schools Player of the Year and earning first-team all-league and district honors. Hamdan also was a starting center for the school's basketball team and played baseball for the 15-and-under U.S. National Baseball team.

== College career ==
Hamdan attended Indiana University where he posted 2,115 yards and nine touchdowns during his senior year for the Indiana Hoosiers. However, he also threw 14 interceptions his senior year, the worst in the Big Ten. His yardage total was seventh-best in Indiana history. He was named Big Ten Co-Player of the Week for his 24-of-36, 310-yard and career-high four touchdown performance in the 32–29 win over Wisconsin. Hamdan also played baseball at Indiana.

== Professional career ==
=== Washington Redskins ===
Hamdan was a seventh-round (232nd overall) pick by the Washington Redskins in the 2003 NFL draft. Though he was impressive in training camp, the team originally decided to keep just two quarterbacks entering the regular season. He was on the team's practice squad the first ten weeks of his rookie season before being signed to the active roster. He suited up for all five of the remaining games, and Hamdan finally made his NFL debut on December 27 during the last two minutes of the game against the Philadelphia Eagles, achieving one first down while going 1-for-2 for seven yards.

Hamdan played in NFL Europe in the spring of 2004, where he was backup quarterback behind third-year NFL Europe veteran Clint Stoerner. He was released by the Redskins in September following training camp on September 5, 2004.

=== Los Angeles Avengers ===
Hamdan was signed by the Los Angeles Avengers of the Arena Football League on November 19, 2004.

=== Seattle Seahawks (first stint) ===
Hamdan signed with the Seattle Seahawks January 13, 2005. He was once again allocated to NFL Europe. Though originally winning the starting quarterback job for the Amsterdam Admirals over Kurt Kittner, a broken collarbone cut short Hamdan's season. In the four games he started, he posted 39 completions out of 75 attempts for a total of 556 yards, five touchdowns and two interceptions. He was once again released at the conclusion of training camp.

In January 2006, Hamdan was re-signed by the Seahawks and allocated to NFL Europe for the third straight year. A broken ankle injury incurred on the first down of the first drive of game seven cut short his season once again; Hamdan was the league's leading passer and earned Offensive Most Valuable Player honors. He started seven games and posted 102 completions out of 162 attempts for a total of 1629 yards, 12 touchdowns and three interceptions, posting a perfect passer rating in the third game of the season against Frankfurt Galaxy. He holds the record for average passer rating for the season in NFL Europe at 113.4. This would not be enough to make the Seahawks, however, as he was waived on August 28, 2006.

=== San Francisco 49ers ===
The San Francisco 49ers claimed Hamdan off waivers but released him a few days later. On September 3, he was signed to the 49ers' practice squad.

=== Seattle Seahawks (second stint) ===
Due to an injury to starting quarterback Matt Hasselbeck, the Seahawks elected to re-sign Hamdan to their active roster on October 24 to provide depth. He was inactive for six games with the Seahawks before being released on December 5 and added to the team's practice squad.

=== Miami Dolphins ===
After Hamdan's contract with the Seahawks expired in January, he was signed to a future contract with the Miami Dolphins on February 6, 2007. He was released at the conclusion of the preseason on September 1.

=== Buffalo Bills ===
On September 26, 2007, the Buffalo Bills signed Hamdan to their practice squad after an injury to starting quarterback J. P. Losman. The Bills released Craig Nall and promoted Hamdan to the team's 3rd QB on October 19. Due to the injury of Trent Edwards, Hamdan was promoted to backup quarterback for the game between the Bills and the Bengals on November 4, 2007.

Hamdan appeared in 3 preseason games in 2008, completing 30/47 passes for 258 yards averaging 5.5 yards, and having a 63.8% completion rate with no touchdowns or interceptions for a passer rating of 78.1. Hamdan suffered a concussion during the final preseason game against the Detroit Lions, a game in which he started.

Hamdan was promoted backup quarterback for the last two games of the 2008 season, pushing Losman back to third string, who had lost his starting role earlier that year to Trent Edwards.

A restricted free agent in the 2009 offseason, Hamdan was re-signed by the Bills on February 26 as the Buffalo Bills. The signing of Ryan Fitzpatrick put him back to third string at the start of the 2009 training camp.

He attended the NFL broadcasters bootcamp in 2009 and was featured on his own weekly show on the Bills website named 'Hanging Ten with Hamdan'.

Hamdan appeared in all 4 2009 preseason games, with 32/48 attempts completed for 427 yards, averaging 8.9 yards, a 66.7% completion rate, one touchdown and 2 interceptions for a passer rating of 84.3.

Hamdan was waived on November 19, 2009, in favor of Brian Brohm, who was signed off the Green Bay Packers' practice squad. The Bills re-signed Hamdan on December 22, 2009, after injuries to Fitzpatrick and Edwards, with cornerback Terrence McGee going on injured reserve to make room for Hamdan on the roster.

=== Toronto Argonauts ===
On March 10, 2010, it was announced that Hamdan had signed a one-year-plus option contract with the Toronto Argonauts of the Canadian Football League. He retired from football on June 4, 2010.

== International baseball career ==
Hamdan played youth international baseball for the United States U-15 national baseball team. However, on August 18, 2022, he announced that he would represent Pakistan in the qualifiers for the 2023 World Baseball Classic. He ultimately did not participate in the qualifiers, after testing positive for COVID-19.

== Personal life ==
Hamdan is married to Jenny Grant, granddaughter of former head coach in the NFL and CFL Bud Grant. Hamdan's younger brother Bush is also a former quarterback who played at Boise State, and is currently the offensive coordinator at Kentucky.

After football, Hamdan started his own fashion line.
