= Kurt Kittner =

American football player (born 1980)

No. 15
- Position: Quarterback

Personal information
- Born: January 23, 1980 (age 46); Schaumburg, Illinois, U.S.
- Listed height: 6 ft 2 in (1.88 m)
- Listed weight: 211 lb (96 kg)

Career information
- High school: Schaumburg
- College: Illinois
- NFL draft: 2002: 5th round, 158th overall pick

Career history
- Atlanta Falcons (2002–2003); Cincinnati Bengals (2004)*; New York Giants (2004)*; New England Patriots (2004)*; Pittsburgh Steelers (2004)*; Chicago Bears (2005); Amsterdam Admirals (2005)
- * Offseason or practice squad member only

Awards and highlights
- World Bowl XIII champion; World Bowl XIII MVP (2005); Second-team All-Big Ten (2001)

Career NFL statistics
- Passing attempts: 114
- Passing completions: 44
- Completion percentage: 38.6%
- TD–INT: 2–6
- Passing yards: 391
- Passer rating: 32.5
- Stats at Pro Football Reference

Kurt Kittner (born January 23, 1980) is an American former professional football player who was a quarterback for the Atlanta Falcons of the National Football League (NFL). He played college football for the Illinois Fighting Illini and was selected by the Atlanta Falcons in the fifth round of the 2002 NFL draft.

== Early life ==
Kittner was quarterback for Schaumburg High School under then-coach Tom Cerasani.

== College career ==
Becoming a starter near the end of his freshman year at the University of Illinois Urbana-Champaign under head coach Ron Turner, Kittner became one of the most prolific passers in Fighting Illini history. He ended his tenure at Illinois as the school's all-time leader in career passing attempts (1,264), career passing touchdowns (70), passing touchdowns in a single season (27), and victories as a quarterback (24). Kittner wrapped up his collegiate career only 3 yards shy of Jack Trudeau's Illini record for all time passing yards. Entering his senior year, Kurt was considered a possible Heisman Trophy candidate. Kittner and receiver Brandon Lloyd led Illinois' offense as the Fighting Illini finished with a 7–1 record in the Big Ten and won their first Big Ten championship in 11 years on their way to a berth in the 2002 Sugar Bowl. Kittner's last collegiate game ended in a 47–34 loss against the LSU Tigers.

== Professional career ==
=== Atlanta Falcons ===
Kittner was selected 158th overall in the fifth round of the 2002 NFL draft by the Atlanta Falcons. He saw no action in his rookie year, being third-string quarterback behind Doug Johnson and 2001 first overall pick, Michael Vick. In 2003, after a preseason injury sidelined Vick and ineffective play caused second-string quarterback Doug Johnson to be benched, Kittner saw his first regular season action. Playing in seven games (four of which he started), he threw for 391 yards, scoring 2 touchdowns and throwing 6 interceptions. The highlight was a 27–7 win over the New York Giants at Giants Stadium where Kittner threw for a touchdown. The Falcons ended the season however with a 5–11 record.

=== Turbulent times ===
Kittner did not seen any further playing time in the NFL, being released from five different teams (the Falcons, Bengals, Giants, Patriots, and Steelers) in a seven month span during the 2004 offseason. He did manage to make headlines in 2005, leading the Amsterdam Admirals to an NFL Europe World Bowl Championship. His 239 passing yards and two touchdowns in World Bowl XIII earned him Most Valuable Player honors for the game. He is the second graduate of Schaumburg High School to earn the honor; Paul Justin won the award ten years earlier for the Frankfurt Galaxy.

=== Chicago Bears ===
In 2005, Kittner was invited to training camp with the Chicago Bears and coach Turner, then offensive coordinator for Chicago. He earned a roster spot as the third-string quarterback. After starter Rex Grossman was injured in camp, journeyman Jeff Blake was brought in to back up rookie starter Kyle Orton, leaving Kittner at third string. When Grossman returned from injury on November 23, 2005, Kittner was released without playing a regular season down for the Bears.

== Life after football ==
Kittner currently resides in Chicago with his wife Leila Cehajic, a former University of Illinois tennis player. He works for Jones Lang LaSalle in Chicago doing commercial real estate. In July 2007, Kittner was named the color analyst for University of Illinois football radio broadcasts, replacing long-time analyst Jim Grabowski.
