= World Bowl XIII =

2005 NFL Europe championship game

Amsterdam Admirals (2nd)	Berlin Thunder (1st)
27	21
	1	2	3	4	Total
AMS	7	10	7	3	27
BER	0	7	0	14	21
- Date: Saturday, June 11, 2005
- Stadium: LTU arena Düsseldorf, Germany
- MVP: Kurt Kittner, quarterback
- Referee: Scott Green
- Attendance: 35,134

Ceremonies
- Halftime show: Shaggy

TV in the United States
- Network: Fox
- Announcers: Curt Menefee and Brian Baldinger

World Bowl XIII, officially known as Yello Strom World Bowl XIII, was NFL Europe's 2005 championship game. It was played at the LTU arena in Düsseldorf, Germany on June 11, 2005. In this match-up, the 6–4 Amsterdam Admirals got back to the World Bowl after losing in World Bowl III and spending nearly a decade being on the outside. Their opponent for the match-up was the Berlin Thunder, who were coming off their best year (9–1 and a victory in World Bowl XII) and made it back to the World Bowl with a 7–3 record, hoping to defend their title. Officially, 35,134 fans were in attendance for the fight. After many years of suffering, the Admirals won their first World Bowl title by stripping the defending champion Thunder of their title, by a final score of 27–21. Taking home most valuable player honors was Admirals QB Kurt Kittner, who went 15 of 28 for 239 yards with two touchdowns and no interceptions.

== Background ==
The Admirals won the first meeting 31–27 in Amsterdam, while the Thunder took the second meeting 27–16 in Berlin.

== Game summary ==
The Admirals drew first blood on their opening possession as Admirals quarterback Kurt Kittner led his team on a 9-play, 68-yard drive and capped it off with a 22-yard touchdown pass to wide receiver Ruvell Martin, the only score of the first quarter.

In the second quarter, the Admirals would quickly add to their lead as they took advantage of a fumble recovery to take control at Berlin's 12-yard line, leading to a 12-yard touchdown pass from Kittner to tight end Mike Gomez. On their next possession, the Admirals continued to pour it on, stopping a 4th down conversion from the Thunder and taking over with good field position at Berlin's 27-yard line. Despite the good position, the Thunder defense finally stiffened and the Admirals had to settle for a 32-yard field goal by kicker Chris Snyder. Berlin would finally be able to get on the board near the end of the half, as Thunder quarterback Dave Ragone led his team on a 4-play, 51-yard drive and capped it off with a 10-yard pass to wide receiver Aaron Boone. Despite the impressive resurgence, the first half belonged to Amsterdam as they led 17–7 at halftime.

In the third quarter, the Admirals continued to show how much they wanted Berlin's crown; their first drive of the second half being 4-play, 80-yard drive that ended with running back Jonathan Smith reaching the endzone on an 18-yard touchdown run.

Trailing 24–7 going into the fourth quarter, the Thunder needed a lot of points in a hurry, if they wanted to defend their title. Continuing a drive that began in the final seconds of the third quarter, Ragone led his team on a 5-play, 80-yard drive that concluded with a 10-yard touchdown pass to running back Little John Flowers. However, the Admirals continued to put the game further out of reach, as they responded with a 28-yard field goal by Snyder. Ragone and his Thunder would respond with a 10-play, 78-yard drive to make it a one-score game; 27–21. With another long drive, the Berlin Thunder set themselves up near the redzone again, where the Admirals forced the Thunder to 4th down with five seconds to spare. The final play ended with Norman LeJeune writing history for the Amsterdam Admirals when he batted away a Dave Ragone pass intended for wide receiver Redd. The Admirals pulled off an upset by taking down the defending champions, winning their first World Bowl title.

=== Scoring summary ===
- Amsterdam – TD Martin 22 yd pass from Kittner 4:52 1st
- Amsterdam – TD Gomez 12 yd pass from Kittner 3:03 2nd
- Amsterdam – FG Snyder 32 yd 8:00 2nd
- Berlin – TD Boone 10 yd pass from Ragone 14:27 2nd
- Amsterdam – TD Smith 18 yd run 5:14 3rd
- Berlin – TD Flowers 10 yd pass from Ragone 1:19 4th
- Amsterdam – FG Snyder 28 yd 5:51 4th
- Berlin – TD Redd 10 yd pass from Ragone 10:05 4th
