= Amsterdam Admirals =

Professional American football team in the Netherlands

Logo

General information
- Founded: 1995
- Folded: 2007
- Stadium: Amsterdam Arena
- Headquartered: Amsterdam, Netherlands
- Colors: Admirals Blue, Orange, Green, White, Light Blue
- Mascot: Albert the Albatross

Personnel
- Head coach: Bart Andrus

League / conference affiliations
- NFL Europe

Championships
- World Bowls: 1 World Bowl XIII (2005)

The Amsterdam Admirals were a professional American football team based in Amsterdam, Netherlands, playing in the NFL Europe.

== History ==
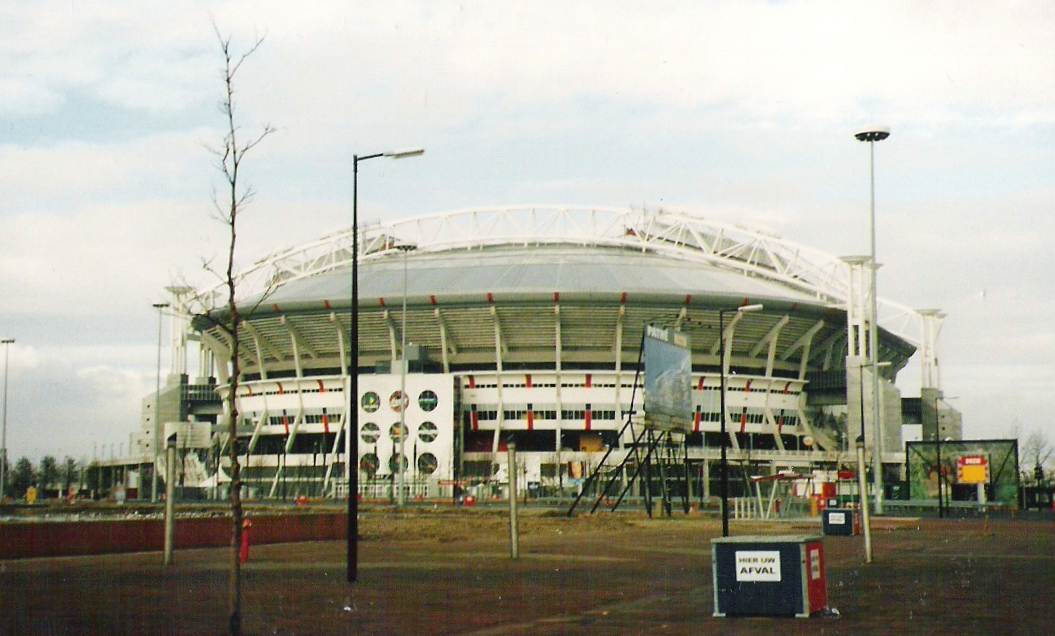
Following its completion in 1996, the Admirals moved into the Amsterdam ArenA (2000 image) in time for the 1997 WLAF season.

The Admirals were formed in 1995 as part of the NFL's plan to restart the World League of American Football, to be based entirely in Europe. The Admirals were one of three new teams, the others being the Scottish Claymores based in Edinburgh and the Rhein Fire based in Düsseldorf, Germany, to join the old World League's European Division teams: the Barcelona Dragons, the Frankfurt Galaxy, and the London Monarchs.

The Admirals began playing their home games at the old Olympisch Stadion, built in 1928 for the Summer Games. They played there for two years until the Amsterdam ArenA was completed in 1996. When the Admirals were forced to schedule their last home game of the 2000 season against the Claymores away from the ArenA as Euro 2000 preparations were finalized, they made a return to the Olympisch Stadion in what turned out to be one of the most unusual games in American football history. The end zone at the north end of the stadium was ruled unsafe by the officials as the surface was in poor condition, so it was decided that the teams would change ends at every change of possession and play towards the other end zone.

They qualified for the 1995 World Bowl with a 9–1 regular season record, but lost to the Frankfurt Galaxy by a score of 26–22. Ten years later, in their eleventh year of existence, the Admirals won their first World Bowl by defeating the defending champion Berlin Thunder 27–21 in the championship game's 13th edition. The next season, they failed to defend their title against the Frankfurt Galaxy 22–7 in World Bowl XIV.

Under the "Player Continuity Program", the Admirals contracted linebacker Derrick Ballard and running back Jonathan Smith for the 2007 season.

== Season-by-season ==
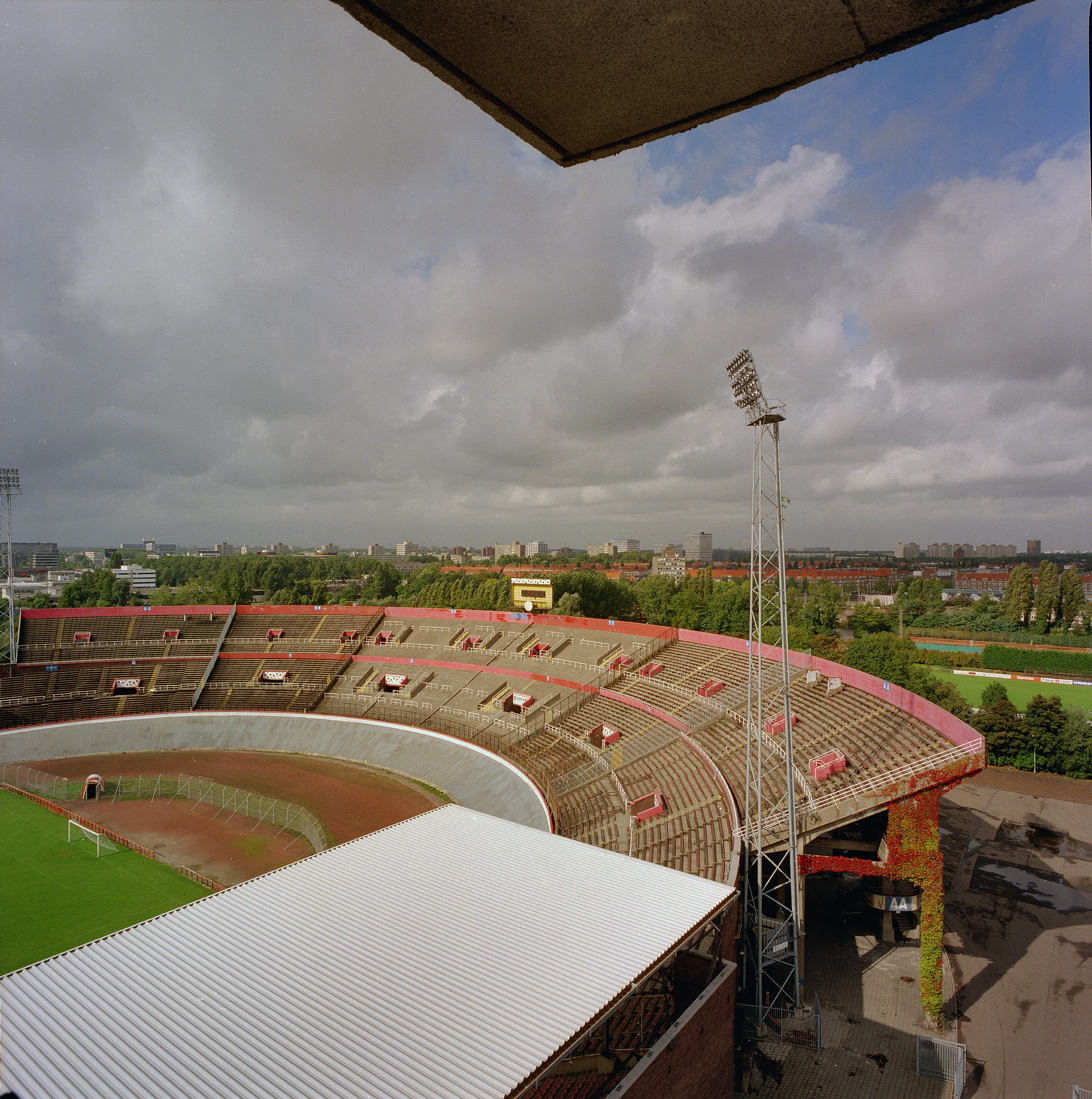
The Admirals' first home ground was the Olympic Stadium (1995 image), built for the Summer Olympic Games of 1928. World Bowl '95–between Amsterdam Admirals and Frankfurt Galaxy–was also held there.

| Season | League | Regular season | | | | | Postseason | | | |
| Season | League | Won | Lost | Ties | Win % | Finish | Won | Lost | Win % | Result |
|---|---|---|---|---|---|---|---|---|---|---|
| 1995 | WLAF | 9 | 1 | 0 | .900 | 1st (League) | 0 | 1 | .000 | Lost to Frankfurt Galaxy in World Bowl III |
| 1996 | WLAF | 5 | 5 | 0 | .500 | 3rd (League) | – | – | — | Out of playoffs. |
| 1997 | WLAF | 5 | 5 | 0 | .500 | 4th (League) | – | – | — | No playoffs. |
| 1998 | NFLE | 7 | 3 | 0 | .700 | 3rd (League) | – | – | — | Out of playoffs. |
| 1999 | NFLE | 4 | 6 | 0 | .400 | 4th (League) | – | – | — | No playoffs. |
| 2000 | NFLE | 4 | 6 | 0 | .400 | 4th (League) | – | – | — | No playoffs. |
| 2001 | NFLE | 4 | 6 | 0 | .400 | 5th (League) | – | – | — | No playoffs. |
| 2002 | NFLE | 4 | 6 | 0 | .400 | 5th (League) | – | – | — | No playoffs. |
| 2003 | NFLE | 4 | 6 | 0 | .400 | 5th (League) | – | – | — | No playoffs. |
| 2004 | NFLE | 5 | 5 | 0 | .500 | 3rd (League) | – | – | — | No playoffs. |
| 2005 | NFLE | 6 | 4 | 0 | .600 | 2nd (League) | 1 | 0 | 1.000 | World Bowl XIII champions |
| 2006 | NFLE | 7 | 3 | 0 | .700 | 1st (League) | 0 | 1 | .000 | Lost to Frankfurt Galaxy in World Bowl XIV |
| 2007 | NFLE | 4 | 6 | 0 | .400 | 5th (League) | – | – | — | No playoffs. |
| Total | | 68 | 62 | 0 | .523 | | 1 | 2 | .333 | |

== Head coaches ==
| # | Name | Term | Regular season | | | | | Postseason | | | | Achievements |
| # | Name | Term | GC | Won | Lost | Ties | Win % | GC | Won | Lost | Win % | Achievements |
|---|---|---|---|---|---|---|---|---|---|---|---|---|
| 1 | Al Luginbill | 1995–2000 | 60 | 34 | 26 | 0 | .567 | 1 | 0 | 1 | .000 | — |
| 2 | Bart Andrus | 2001–2007 | 70 | 34 | 36 | 0 | .486 | 2 | 1 | 1 | .500 | World Bowl XIII championship NFL Europe Coach of the Year (2005) |

== Attendance ==
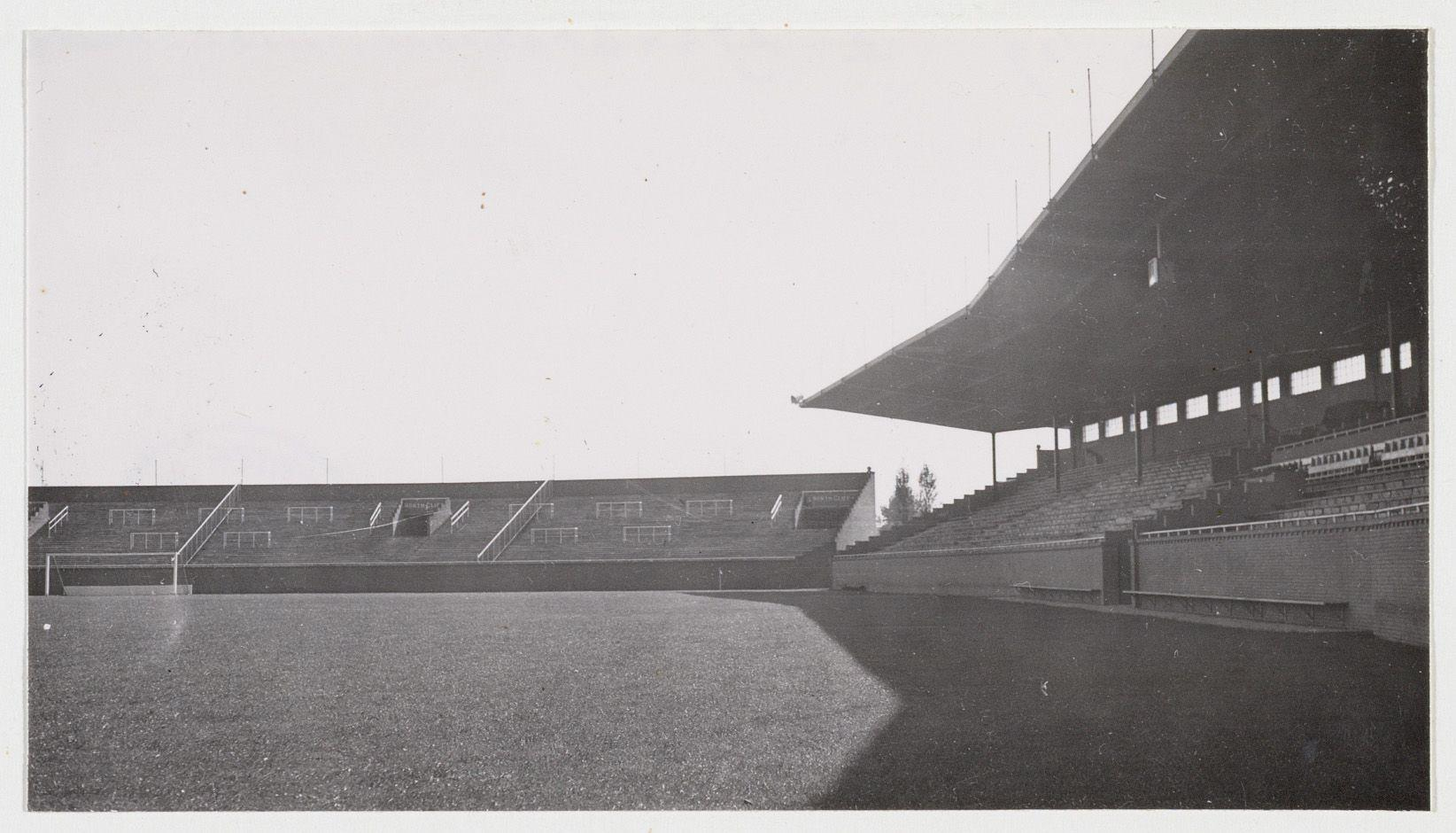
Amsterdam's second home match of 1995 was played at De Meer (1937 photo) shortly before closure in 1996 and demolition in 1998.

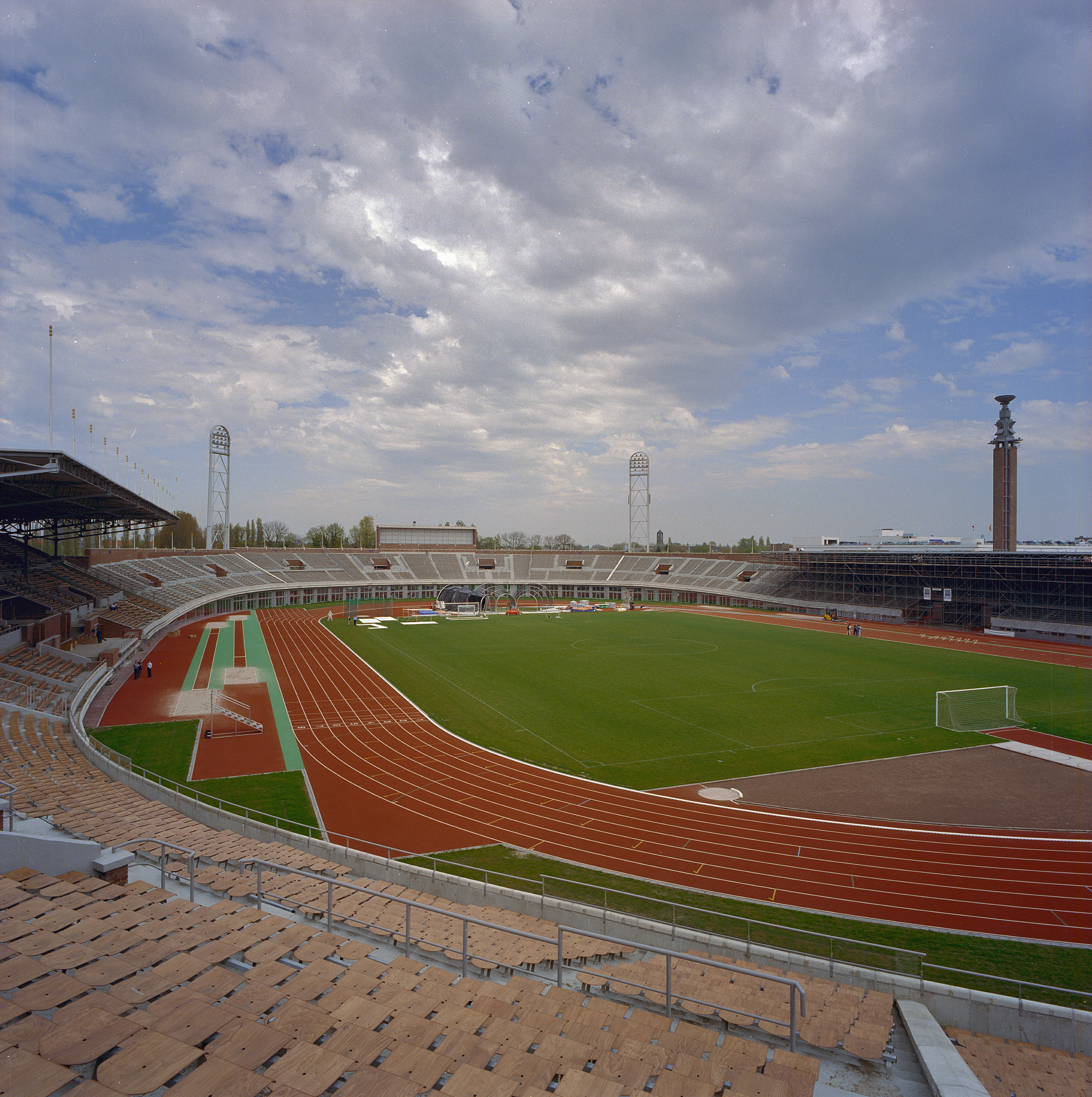
The club twice returned to the Olympic Stadium–restored in the Admirals' absence–after the 1997 move: once for their last home match of the 2000 NFL Europe season, versus Scottish Claymores; and for a 2007 NFL Europa game against Berlin Thunder that proved to be the final match in their history.

Source: Kenn.com

| Year | Games | Total | Average |
|---|---|---|---|
Amsterdam Admirals (World League)
| 1995 | 5 | 72,767 | 14,553 |
| 1996 | 5 | 50,094 | 10,019 |
| 1997 | 5 | 73,425 | 14,685 |
Amsterdam Admirals (NFL Europe)
| 1998 | 5 | 79,263 | 15,853 |
| 1999 | 5 | 61,444 | 12,289 |
| 2000 | 5 | 54,985 | 10,997 |
| 2001 | 5 | 66,292 | 13,258 |
| 2002 | 5 | 58,322 | 11,664 |
| 2003 | 5 | 57,208 | 11,442 |
| 2004 | 5 | 62,496 | 12,499 |
| 2005 | 5 | 64,386 | 12,877 |
| 2006 | 5 | 67,106 | 13,421 |
Amsterdam Admirals (NFL Europa)
| 2007 | 5 | 58,390 | 11,678 |
| 13 | 65 | 826,178 | 12,710 |

== Ring of Honor ==
- (United States) Mike Evans – DE (1995–1997)
- (United States) Adam Vinatieri – K (1995)
- (United States) Jonathan Kirksey – DT (1995, 1998–2001)
- (Netherlands) Frank Temming – RB (1995–2000)
- (Netherlands) Silvio Diliberto – K (1997–2004)
- (United States) Kurt Warner – QB (1998)
- (United States) Derrick Levake – OL (1999–2000)
- (United States) Rafael Cooper – RB (2002)

== Notable players ==
- (United States) Mike Evans – DE (1995–1997)
- David Krause - FB (1995-1999)
- (United States) Jamie Martin – QB (1995)
- (United States) Brad Lebo – QB (1995)
- (Australia) Darren Bennett – P (1995)
- (United States) Adam Vinatieri –K (1996)
- (United States) Will Furrer – QB (1995–1996)
- (United States) Mario Cristobal – OG (1995–1996)
- (United States) Jay Fiedler – QB (1997)
- (United States) Ta'ase Faumui – DE (1998)
- (United States) Kurt Warner – QB (1998)
- (United States) Jake Delhomme – QB (1998)
- (United States) Tom Nütten – OG (1998)
- (United States) Joe Douglass – WR (1998–1999)
- (United States) Dan Gonzalez – QB (1999)
- (United States) Jim Kubiak – QB (1999–2000)
- (United States) Ron Powlus – QB (2000)
- (El Salvador) José Cortéz – K (2000)
- (Italy) Francesco Biancamano – P/K (1999–2000)
- (United States) Spergon Wynn – QB (2001)
- (United States) Kevin Daft – QB (2002)
- (United States) Shaun Hill – QB (2003)
- (United States) Clint Stoerner – QB (2004)
- (United States) Gibran Hamdan – QB (2004–2006)
- (United States) Kurt Kittner – QB (2005)
- (United States) Jarrett Payton – RB (2005)
- (United States) Ruvell Martin – WR (2005)
- (United States) Cory Peoples – S (2005)
- (United States) Norman LeJeune – S (2005)
- (United States) Jeff Roehl – OL (2006)
- (United States) Jared Allen – QB (2006)
- (United States) Glenn Pakulak – P (2006–2007)
- (United States) Shawn Morgan – LB (2006)
- (United States) Derrick Ballard – LB (2005–2007) 2007 contract player
- (United States) Jonathan Smith – RB (2005 & 2007) 2007 contract player
- (United States) Chris Wing – DE/LB (1999)
- (Sweden) Carl-Johan Björk – LB (2005–2007)

== League records (1995–2007) ==
=== Individual records ===
- Note: NFLE had a 10-game season.

| Highest pass rating, season (qualifiers) | | | Most passes attempted, season | | |
| Player | Year | Rating | Player | Year | Attempted |
|---|---|---|---|---|---|
| Gibran Hamdan | 2006 | 113.4 | Will Furrer | 1996 | 368 |
| Most passes completed, season | | | Highest average gain, season (qualifiers) | | |
| Player | Year | Completed | Player | Year | Average |
| Shaun Hill | 2003 | 220 | Gibran Hamdan | 2006 | 10.06 |
| Most consecutive passes attempted, none intercepted | | | Most games, 100 or more yards pass receiving, season | | |
| Player | Year | Attempted | Player | Year | Games |
| Ron Powlus | 2000 | 156 | Skyler Fulton | 2006 | 6 |
| Most consecutive games, 100 or more yards pass receiving | | | Most yards gained, career | | |
| Player | Year | Games | Player | Year | Yards |
| Matthew Hatchette | 2003 | 4 | Joe Douglass | 1998–1999 | 624 |
| Longest punt return | | | Most Opponents' Fumbles Recovered, season | | |
| Player | Year | Yards | Player | Year | Fumbles |
| Matthew Hatchette | Amsterdam vs. Berlin, 5/31/03 | 101 | Karmeeleyah McGill | 1995 | 4 |
Longest Fumble Return
| Player | Year | Yards | | | |
| Derrick Ballard | Amsterdam vs. Berlin, 3/18/06 | 95 | | | |

=== Team records ===
| Most passes completed, season | | Fewest Passes Completed, season | |
| Year | Completed | Year | Completed |
|---|---|---|---|
| 2003 | 271 | 1997 | 116 |
| Fewest Yards Gained, season | | Fewest rushing touchdowns, season | |
| Year | Yards | Year | Touchdowns |
| 1997 | 1208 | 2000 | 1 |
| Most Points, Both Teams, game | | Most punt returns, season | |
| Year | Points | Year | Yards |
| 5/31/03 (vs. Berlin) | 94 (51–43) | 1998 | 39 |
| Most yards gained on Punt Return, game | | Most yards gained on Punt Return, Both Teams, game | |
| Year | Yards | Year | Yards |
| 5/11/96 (vs. London) | 175 | 5/11/96 (vs. London) | 201 |
| Fewest Yards Gained on Kickoff Return, game | | Most yards gained on Kickoff Return, Both Teams, game | |
| Year | Yards | Year | Yards |
| 5/28/00 (vs. Frankfurt) | 2 | 5/31/03 (vs. Berlin) | 451 (188–263) |
| Fewest Fumbles, season | | Fewest Fumbles Lost, season | |
| Year | Fumbles | Year | Fumbles |
| 2003 | 7 | 2003 | 2 |
| Most Fumbles Lost, Both Teams, game | | Most Opponents' Fumbles Recovered, season | |
| Year | Fumbles | Year | Fumbles |
| 5/13/95 (vs. Barcelona) | 8 (4–4) | 1995 | 20 |
| Most Opponents' Fumbles Recovered, Both Teams, game | | Fewest Yards Penalized, Both Teams, game | |
| Year | Fumbles | Year | Yards |
| 5/13/95 (vs. Barcelona) | 8 (4–4) | 5/18/97 (vs. Scotland) | 25 (15–10) |
| Most Yards Penalized, Both Teams, game | | Fewest yards allowed by Defense, rushing, season | |
| Year | Yards | Year | Yards |
| 6/1/02 (vs. Frankfurt) | 294 (116–178) | 2000 | 654 |

Source: NFLEurope.com

== See also ==
- Amsterdam Admirals 2006
- Amsterdam Admirals 2007
