= 2026 Florida State Seminoles football team =

American college team

2026 Florida State Seminoles football
- Conference: Atlantic Coast Conference
- Record: 5–6 (3–5 ACC)
- Head coach: Mike Norvell (7th season; first 8 games); Rick Stockstill (interim; remainder of season)
- Offensive coordinator: Tim Harris Jr. (1st season)
- Offensive scheme: Spread option
- Defensive coordinator: Tony White (2nd season; first 8 games); Ernie Sims (interim; remainder of season)
- Base defense: 3–3–5
- Home stadium: Doak Campbell Stadium

2026 Atlantic Coast Conference football standings
	Conf.			Overall
Team	W		L	W		L
No. 7 Miami (FL) y	8	–	0	10	–	1
No. 11 Wake Forest y	7	–	1	10	–	1
No. 23 Louisville	7	–	2	8	–	3
Clemson	5	–	3	7	–	4
SMU	5	–	3	7	–	4
Duke	4	–	4	7	–	4
Stanford	4	–	4	6	–	5
Virginia	4	–	4	6	–	5
Boston College	3	–	4	5	–	6
Pittsburgh	3	–	5	6	–	5
Virginia Tech	3	–	5	6	–	5
NC State	3	–	5	5	–	6
Florida State	3	–	5	5	–	6
Syracuse	3	–	6	5	–	6
North Carolina	2	–	5	5	–	6
California	2	–	6	3	–	8
Georgia Tech	2	–	6	3	–	8
Championship: Miami (FL) vs. Wake Forest
^ – College Football Playoff participant; $ – Conference champion; y – Championship game participant; As of November 22, 2026; Rankings from CFP rankings

The 2026 Florida State Seminoles football team represents Florida State University in the Atlantic Coast Conference during the 2026 NCAA Division I FBS football season. The Seminoles were led by Mike Norvell, until he was fired on November 1, in his seventh year as their head coach. The Seminoles play home games at Doak Campbell Stadium, located in Tallahassee, Florida.

Going into the season, Norvell was considered to be sitting on one of the hottest seats in the nation, following losing seasons in 2024 and 2025. Florida State began the season in week zero with a win over the New Mexico State Aggies before two straight losses to the SMU Mustangs in their conference opener and then the Alabama Crimson Tide, the twelfth consecutive road loss for the Seminoles, dating back to 2023. The Seminoles evened their record with a win over the Central Arkansas Bears of the FCS, the alma mater of head coach Mike Norvell, and then won their first conference game of the season with a victory over the Virginia Cavaliers, winning the Jefferson-Eppes Trophy for the first time since 2014, with Ashton Daniels scoring five rushing touchdowns, setting a single-game school record for a quarterback. Florida State then lost on the road to the Louisville Cardinals, surrendering a double-digit lead, and to their rival Miami Hurricanes in double overtime.

Following a bye week, the Seminoles suffered their third straight defeat with a loss to the Clemson Tigers, resulting in the dismissals of head coach Mike Norvell and defensive coordinator Tony White; director of scouting Rick Stockstill was announced as interim head coach for the remainder of the season. In their first game under Stockstill, the Seminoles beat the Boston College Eagles to end their road-game losing streak. Florida State then got another road win with a victory over the Pittsburgh Panthers, the first time the Seminoles had won consecutive games on the road in three years. The Seminoles finished out their conference schedule with a homecoming loss to the NC State Wolfpack, being held scoreless in the second half, to finish with a losing record in the ACC for a third consecutive year.

== Offseason ==
=== 2026 NFL draft ===
Round	Pick	Player	Position	Team
4	103	Darrell Jackson Jr.	DL	New York Jets

=== Transfers ===
==== Outgoing ====
Player	Position	Destination
Luke Douglas	TE	Appalachian State
Tyeland Coleman	DL	Arkansas State
Manasse Itete	IOL	Arkansas State
Shamar Arnoux	CB	Auburn
KJ Sampson	DL	Boston College
Jamorie Flagg	DL	FIU
Josh Raymond	IOL	Georgia Southern
Willy Suarez	WR	Indiana State
Kam Davis	RB	Liberty
Tye Hylton	OT	Louisiana Tech
Lawayne McCoy	WR	Louisville
Jayden Parrish	LB	Memphis
Jaylen King	QB	Mercer
Jake Weinberg	K	Miami (FL)
Gav Holman	LB	Mississippi State
Jayson Jenkins	EDGE	Mississippi State
Ja'Elyne Matthews	OT	Mississippi State
Mario Nash Jr.	OT	Mississippi State
Amaree Williams	EDGE	Mississippi State
Jaden Jones	EDGE	Missouri
Bruno Reus	K	Missouri
Gavin Sawchuk	RB	Northwestern
Earl Little Jr.	S	Ohio State
James Williams	EDGE	Oklahoma State
Edwin Joseph	S	Ole Miss
Randy Pittman Jr.	TE	SMU
Elijah Moore	WR	Syracuse
Camdon Frier	WR	Tarleton State
Mac Chiumento	P	Texas
Justin Cryer	LB	Texas
Jaylin Lucas	RB	Tulane
L A Jessie Harrold	EDGE	UCF
Brock Glenn	QB	Western Kentucky
Christian White	DB	Western Kentucky
Cai Bates	CB	Wisconsin
Lucas Simmons-Johansson	OT	Wisconsin
Grant Fielder	DL	Unknown
Jeremiah Johnson	RB	Unknown
Jayvan Boggs	WR	Withdrawn
Darryll Desir	EDGE	Withdrawn
Mandrell Desir	EDGE	Withdrawn
Omar Graham Jr.	LB	Withdrawn
Kevin Wynn	DL	Withdrawn

==== Incoming ====
Player	Position	Previous school
Xavier Chaplin	OT	Auburn
Ashton Daniels	QB	Auburn
Nate Pabst	OT	Bowling Green
Ma'Khi Jones	S	Duke
Desirrio Riles	TE	East Carolina
Gemari Sands	RB	Florida Atlantic
CJ Richard Jr.	S	Illinois State
Dean DeNobile	QB	Lafayette
Daniel Hughes	P	New Mexico
Mikai Gbayor	LB	North Carolina
Caleb Bowers	LS	North Dakota State
Karson Hobbs	CB	Notre Dame
Gabe Panikowski	K	Oklahoma State
Bradyn Joiner	IOL	Purdue
Conor McAneney	K	Quincy
Nehemiah Chandler	CB	South Alabama
Chris Jones	LB	Southern Miss
Chimdia Nwaiwu	OT	Stephen F. Austin
Quintrevion Wisner	RB	Texas
Rylan Kennedy	EDGE	Texas A&M
Jordan Sanders	DL	Texas State
Paul Bowling	IOL	Troy
Carter Jula	P	UNLV

== Schedule ==
Date	Time	Opponent	Site	TV	Result	Attendance	Source
August 29	7:00 p.m.	New Mexico State*	Doak Campbell Stadium; Tallahassee, FL	The CW	W 34–17	65,915	
September 7	7:30 p.m.	No. 19 SMU	Doak Campbell Stadium; Tallahassee, FL (ACC Huddle)	ESPN	L 24–27	60,107	
September 19	3:30 p.m.	at No. 10 Alabama*	Bryant–Denny Stadium; Tuscaloosa, AL	ABC	L 36–50	100,077	
September 26	3:00 p.m.	Central Arkansas*	Doak Campbell Stadium; Tallahassee, FL	ACCN	W 34–7	66,637	
October 3	3:30 p.m.	Virginia	Doak Campbell Stadium; Tallahassee, FL (Jefferson–Eppes Trophy)	ESPN2	W 38–7	55,782	
October 9	7:00 p.m.	at Louisville	L&N Federal Credit Union Stadium; Louisville, KY	ESPN	L 20–44	48,992	
October 17	7:00 p.m.	at No. 3 Miami (FL)	Hard Rock Stadium; Miami Gardens, FL (rivalry, ACC Huddle)	ESPN	L 35–43 ^{2OT}	66,790	
October 31	7:00 p.m.	Clemson	Doak Campbell Stadium; Tallahassee, FL (rivalry)	ACCN	L 24–36	60,472	
November 7	12:00 p.m.	at Boston College	Alumni Stadium; Chestnut Hill, MA	ACCN	W 31–24	37,155	
November 13	7:00 p.m.	at Pittsburgh	Acrisure Stadium; Pittsburgh, PA	ESPN	W 16–10	45,734	
November 21	3:30 p.m.	NC State^{†}	Doak Campbell Stadium; Tallahassee, FL	ACCN	L 10–28	60,143	
November 27	3:30 p.m.	Florida*	Doak Campbell Stadium; Tallahassee, FL (Sunshine Showdown)	ABC			
*Non-conference game; ^{†}Homecoming; Rankings from AP Poll (and CFP Rankings, after November 3) – Released prior to game; All times are in Eastern time

== Game summaries ==
=== vs. New Mexico State ===
New Mexico State Aggies (0–0) at Florida State Seminoles (0–0) – Game summary

Quarter	1	2	3	4	Total
Aggies	0	7	3	7	17
Seminoles	3	14	7	10	34

at Doak Campbell Stadium • Tallahassee, Florida

- Date: August 29
- Game time: 7:00 p.m.
- Game weather: Cloudy • Temperature: 85 °F (29 °C) • Wind: S at 4 miles per hour (6.4 km/h)
- Game attendance: 65,915
- Referee: Jerry Magallanes
- TV announcers (The CW): Thom Brennaman, Jason Cabinda, and Wes Bryant
- Box Score, Recap

Game information
First quarter
- FSU – Gabe Panikowski 43-yard field goal, 3:05. Seminoles 3–0. Drive: 9 plays, 55 yards, 5:08.

Second quarter

- FSU – Ashton Daniels 4-yard run (Gabe Panikowski kick), 14:15. Seminoles 10–0. Drive: 7 plays, 60 yards, 2:23.
- NMSU – Brodie Malone-Bradford 33-yard pass from Trey Hedden (Ilya Uvaydov kick), 10:49. Seminoles 10–7. Drive: 9 plays, 75 yards, 3:26.
- FSU – Samuel Singleton Jr. 4-yard pass from Ashton Daniels (Gabe Panikowski kick), 0:36. Seminoles 17–7. Drive: 8 plays, 58 yards, 2:49.

Third quarter

- NMSU – Ilya Uvaydov 38-yard field goal, 7:36. Seminoles 17–10. Drive: 12 plays, 68 yards, 5:15.
- FSU – Samuel Singleton Jr. 2-yard run (Gabe Panikowski kick), 2:09. Seminoles 24–10. Drive: 12 plays, 51 yards, 5:17.

Fourth quarter

- FSU – Gabe Panikowski 41-yard field goal, 10:41. Seminoles 27–10. Drive: 7 plays, 64 yards, 4:08.
- NMSU – TK King 34-yard pass from Trey Hedden (David Barker kick), 7:42. Seminoles 27–17. Drive: 7 plays, 75 yards, 2:59.
- FSU – Ousmane Kromah 1-yard run (Gabe Panikowski kick), 4:01. Seminoles 34–17. Drive: 8 plays, 90 yards, 3:33.

Statistics	NMSU	FSU
First downs	18	20
Plays–yards	66–319	66–419
Rushes–yards	23–47	39–217
Passing yards	272	202
Passing: Comp–Att–Int	26–43–1	17–27–1
Turnovers	1	1
Time of possession	28:28	31:32

Team	Category	Player	Statistics
New Mexico State	Passing	Trey Hedden	26/42, 272 yards, 2 TD, INT
New Mexico State	Rushing	James Jones	11 carries, 28 yards
New Mexico State	Receiving	Brodie Malone-Bradford	6 receptions, 96 yards, TD
Florida State	Passing	Ashton Daniels	17/27, 202 yards, TD, INT
Florida State	Rushing	Ousmane Kromah	14 carries, 115 yards, TD
Florida State	Receiving	Samuel Singleton, Jr.	4 receptions, 54 yards, TD

=== vs. No. 19 SMU ===
No. 19 SMU Mustangs (0–0) at Florida State Seminoles (1–0) – Game summary

Quarter	1	2	3	4	Total
No. 19 Mustangs	7	10	0	10	27
Seminoles	7	3	7	7	24

at Doak Campbell Stadium • Tallahassee, Florida

- Date: September 7
- Game time: 9:15 p.m (delayed from 7:30 p.m due to a power outage in the stadium)
- Game weather: Sunny • Temperature: 81 °F (27 °C)
- Game attendance: 60,107
- Referee: Mike Roche
- TV announcers (ESPN): Dave Pasch, Dusty Dvoracek, and Taylor McGregor
- Box Score, Recap

Game information

First quarter

- SMU – Jalen Cooper 50-yard pass from Kevin Jennings (Nick Reed kick), 9:32. Mustangs 7–0. Drive: 6 plays, 75 yards, 1:38.
- FSU – Ashton Daniels 8-yard run (Gabe Panikowski kick), 1:55. Tied 7–7. Drive: 13 plays, 75 yards, 7:37.

Second quarter

- SMU – Randy Pittman Jr. 10-yard pass from Kevin Jennings (Nick Reed kick), 5:35. Mustangs 14–7. Drive: 8 plays, 43 yards, 3:30.
- FSU – Gabe Panikowski 46-yard field goal, 3:58. Mustangs 14–10. Drive: 5 plays, 47 yards, 1:37.
- SMU – Nick Reed 22-yard field goal, 1:49. Mustangs 17–10. Drive: 5 plays, 69 yards, 2:09.

Third quarter

- FSU – Ousmane Kromah 6-yard run (Gabe Panikowski kick), 2:08. Tied 17–17. Drive: 8 plays, 29 yards, 4:40.

Fourth quarter

- SMU – Yannick Smith 79-yard pass from Kevin Jennings (Nick Reed kick), 12:37. Mustangs 24–17. Drive: 8 plays, 75 yards, 4:20.
- FSU – Samuel Singleton Jr. 39-yard pass from Ashton Daniels (Gabe Panikowski kick), 8:17. Tied 24–24. Drive: 8 plays, 75 yards, 4:20.
- SMU – Nick Reed 20-yard field goal, 0:21. Mustangs 27–24. Drive: 9 plays, 71 yards, 4:35.

Statistics	SMU	FSU
First downs	23	16
Plays–yards	67–585	68–324
Rushes–yards	31–155	45–199
Passing yards	430	125
Passing: comp–att–int	26–36–2	12–23–0
Turnovers	4	1
Time of possession	27:44	32:16

Team	Category	Player	Statistics
SMU	Passing	Kevin Jennings	26/36, 430 yards, 3 TD, 2 INT
SMU	Rushing	Kendrick Raphael	12 carries, 75 yards
SMU	Receiving	Yannick Smith	5 receptions, 107 yards, TD
Florida State	Passing	Ashton Daniels	12/23, 125 yards, TD
Florida State	Rushing	Ousmane Kromah	22 carries, 116 yards, TD
Florida State	Receiving	Samuel Singleton, Jr.	2 receptions, 40 yards, TD

=== at No. 10 Alabama ===
Florida State Seminoles (1–1) at No. 10 Alabama Crimson Tide (2–0) – Game summary

Quarter	1	2	3	4	Total
Seminoles	14	7	7	8	36
No. 10 Crimson Tide	3	23	14	10	50

at Bryant–Denny Stadium • Tuscaloosa, Alabama

- Date: September 19
- Game time: 5:15 p.m (delayed from 3:30 p.m due to lightning)
- Game weather: Sunny • Temperature: 92 °F (33 °C) • Wind: S at 4 miles per hour (6.4 km/h)
- Game attendance: 100,077
- Referee: Kyle Olson
- TV announcers (ABC): Sean McDonough, Greg McElroy and Katie George
- Box Score, Recap

Game information

First Quarter

- FSU - Robinson,Duce 20 yd pass from Daniels,Ashton (Panikowski,Gabe kick) 7 plays, 72 yards, TOP 03:24
- ALA - Talty,Conor 32 yd field goal 8 plays, 20 yards, TOP 03:27
- FSU - Kromah,Ousmane 12 yd run (Panikowski,Gabe kick), 3 plays, 69 yards, TOP 01:17

Second Quarter

- ALA - Talty,Conor 43 yd field goal 9 plays, 50 yards, TOP 02:33
- FSU - Daniels,Ashton 3 yd run (Panikowski,Gabe kick), 9 plays, 75 yards, TOP 04:57
- ALA - Morgan,Cederian 21 yd pass from Russell,Keelon (Talty,Conor kick) 12 plays, 75 yards, TOP 07:06
- ALA - Coleman-Williams,Ryan 46 yd pass from Russell,Keelon () 2 plays, 63 yards, TOP 00:14
- ALA - Edwards,Kaleb 16 yd pass from Russell,Keelon (Talty,Conor kick) 2 plays, 56 yards, TOP 00:12

Third Quarter

- FSU - Thomas,Landen 2 yd pass from Daniels,Ashton (Panikowski,Gabe kick) 9 plays, 75 yards, TOP 05:02
- ALA - Crowell,EJ 4 yd run (Talty,Conor kick), 8 plays, 75 yards, TOP 04:03
- ALA - Russell,Keelon 57 yd run (Talty,Conor kick), 3 plays, 64 yards, TOP 01:30

Fourth Quarter

- ALA - Talty,Conor 45 yd field goal 6 plays, 37 yards, TOP 02:17
- FSU - Daniels,Ashton 6 yd run (Daniels,Ashton rush), 6 plays, 75 yards, TOP 02:26
- ALA - Brown,Trae'shawn 20 yd run (Talty,Conor kick), 9 plays, 90 yards, TOP 05:02

Statistics	FSU	ALA
First downs	17	26
Plays–yards	64–471	66–567
Rushes–yards	35–94	36–247
Passing yards	377	320
Passing: comp–att–int	17–29–3	23–30–0
Turnovers	3	0
Time of possession	27:52	32:08

Team	Category	Player	Statistics
Florida State	Passing	Ashton Daniels	17/29, 377 yards, 2 TD, 3 INT
Florida State	Rushing	Ousmane Kromah	17 carries, 80 yards, TD
Florida State	Receiving	Duce Robinson	6 receptions, 135 yards, TD
Alabama	Passing	Keelon Russell	23/30, 320 yards, 3 TD
Alabama	Rushing	Trae'shawn Brown	12 carries, 86 yards, TD
Alabama	Receiving	Lotzeir Brooks	8 receptions, 101 yards

=== vs. Central Arkansas ===
Central Arkansas Bears (2–2) at Florida State Seminoles (1–2) – Game summary

Quarter	1	2	3	4	Total
Bears (FCS)	0	7	0	0	7
Seminoles	14	10	10	0	34

at Doak Campbell Stadium • Tallahassee, Florida

- Date: September 26
- Game time: 3:00 p.m.
- Game weather: Sunny • Temperature: 82 °F (28 °C) • Wind: N at 6 miles per hour (9.7 km/h)
- Game attendance: 66,637
- Referee: Nolan Dumas
- TV announcers (ACC Network): Doug Sherman, Forrest Conoly and Ashley Stroehlein
- Box Score, Recap

Game information

First Quarter

- FSU: A. Daniels pass to D. Robinson for 29 yds, for a TD (G. Panikowski KICK)

2 plays, 45 yards, 0:31

- FSU: O. Kromah run for 6 yds, for a TD (G. Panikowski KICK)

5 plays, 57 yards, 2:30

Second Quarter

- FSU: G. Panikowski 23 yd FG GOOD

9 plays, 80 yards, 3:40

- FSU: O. Kromah run for 1 yd, for a TD (G. Panikowski KICK)

8 plays, 88 yards, 3:01

- CARK: Ja. Washington run for 2 yds, for a TD (C. Jones KICK)

13 plays, 75 yards, 6:37

Third Quarter

- FSU: A. Daniels pass to J. Boggs for 34 yds, for a TD (G. Panikowski KICK)

6 plays, 80 yards, 3:02

- FSU: G. Panikowski 31 yd FG GOOD

6 plays, 44 yards, 3:02

Statistics	CARK	FSU
First downs	22	24
Plays–yards	73–248	48–417
Rushes–yards	43–110	28–179
Passing yards	138	238
Passing: comp–att–int	15–30–0	14–20–1
Turnovers	0	1
Time of possession	39:12	20:48

Team	Category	Player	Statistics
Central Arkansas	Passing	Donovyn Omolo	15/30, 138 yards
Central Arkansas	Rushing	Jalen Washington	18 carries, 17 yards, TD
Central Arkansas	Receiving	Tyrell Pollard	4 receptions, 41 yards
Florida State	Passing	Ashton Daniels	12/18, 224 yards, 2 TD, INT
Florida State	Rushing	Ousmane Kromah	11 carries, 86 yards, 2 TD
Florida State	Receiving	Jayvan Boggs	6 receptions, 122 yards, TD

=== vs. Virginia ===
Virginia Cavaliers (3–1) at Florida State Seminoles (2–2) – Game summary

Quarter	1	2	3	4	Total
Cavaliers	7	0	0	0	7
Seminoles	0	17	14	7	38

at Doak Campbell Stadium • Tallahassee, Florida

- Date: October 3
- Game time: 3:30 p.m.
- Game weather: Cloudy • Temperature: 80 °F (27 °C) • Wind: 0 miles per hour (0 km/h)
- Game attendance: 55,782
- Referee: Riley Johnson
- TV announcers (ESPN2): Jay Alter, Tom Luginbill, and Lauren Sisler
- Box Score, Recap

Game information

First Quarter

- UVA - Da'Shawn Martin 13-yard pass from Beau Pribula (Will Bettridge kick), 6:04. Cavaliers 7–0. Drive: 7 plays, 63 yards, 3:17.

Second Quarter

- FSU - Ashton Daniels 4-yard run (Gabe Panikowski kick), 11:48. Tied 7–7. Drive: 8 plays, 98 yards, 3:43.
- FSU - Ashton Daniels 3-yard run (Gabe Panikowski kick), 5:58. Seminoles 14–7. Drive: 7 plays, 33 yards, 3:38.
- FSU - Gabe Panikowski 44-yard field goal, 1:01. Seminoles 17–7. Drive: 8 plays, 60 yards, 2:21.

Third Quarter

- FSU - Ashton Daniels 6-yard run (Gabe Panikowski kick), 7:47. Seminoles 24–7. Drive: 8 plays, 78 yards, 3:58.
- FSU - Ashton Daniels 81-yard run (Gabe Panikowski kick), 3:16. Seminoles 31–7. Drive: 2 plays, 81 yards, 0:16.

Fourth Quarter

- FSU - Ashton Daniels 1-yard run (Gabe Panikowski kick), 3:41. Seminoles 38–7. Drive: 8 plays, 47 yards, 5:15.

Statistics	UVA	FSU
First downs	19	22
Plays–yards	72–205	65–464
Rushes–yards	40–37	46–281
Passing yards	168	183
Passing: comp–att–int	14–32–0	12–19–1
Turnovers	0	1
Time of possession	28:09	31:51

Team	Category	Player	Statistics
Virginia	Passing	Beau Pribula	14/32, 168 yards, TD
Virginia	Rushing	Jekail Middlebrook	10 carries, 65 yards
Virginia	Receiving	Isaiah Robinson	2 receptions, 41 yards
Florida State	Passing	Ashton Daniels	12/19, 183 yards, INT
Florida State	Rushing	Ashton Daniels	17 carries, 136 yards, 5 TD
Florida State	Receiving	Micahi Danzy	4 receptions, 70 yards

=== at Louisville ===
Florida State Seminoles (3–2) at Louisville Cardinals (2–3) – Game summary

Quarter	1	2	3	4	Total
Seminoles	14	0	0	6	20
Cardinals	0	14	14	16	44

at L&N Federal Credit Union Stadium • Louisville, Kentucky

- Date: October 9
- Game time: 7:00 p.m.
- Game weather: Sunny • Temperature: 78 °F (26 °C) • Wind: SE at 7 miles per hour (11 km/h)
- Game attendance: 48,992
- Referee: Jon Noli
- TV announcers (ESPN): Mike Monaco, Jordan Rodgers, and Dana Boyle
- Box Score, Recap

Game information

First quarter

- (8:34) FSU – Ashton Daniels 7-yard run (Gabe Panikowski kick) (Drive: 14 plays, 75 yards, 6:26; Florida State 7–0)
- (2:08) FSU – Micahi Danzy 25-yard pass from Ashton Daniels (Gabe Panikowski kick) (Drive: 8 plays, 55 yards, 2:35; Florida State 14–0)

Second quarter

- (9:16) LOU – Isaac Brown 97-yard run (Carson Hilbert kick) (Drive: 1 play, 97 yards, 0:12; Florida State 14–7)
- (3:21) LOU – Maurice Davis 3-yard run (Carson Hilbert kick) (Drive: 7 plays, 59 yards, 3:49; Tied 14–14)

Third quarter

- (12:45) LOU – Lincoln Kienholz 3-yard run (Carson Hilbert kick) (Drive: 4 plays, 14 yards, 2:03; Louisville 21–14)
- (8:06) LOU – Lincoln Kienholz 1-yard run (Carson Hilbert kick) (Drive: 8 plays, 76 yards, 3:52; Louisville 28–14)

Fourth quarter

- (12:57) LOU – Braxton Jennings 44-yard run (Carson Hilbert kick) (Drive: 6 plays, 85 yards, 2:43; Louisville 35–14)
- (8:30) FSU – Micahi Danzy 2-yard pass from Ashton Daniels (Two-point pass conversion failed) (Drive: 10 plays, 79 yards, 4:20; Louisville 35–20)
- (7:37) LOU – Isaac Brown 68-yard run (Carson Hilbert PAT failed) (Drive: 2 plays, 75 yards, 0:53; Louisville 41–20)
- (2:59) LOU – Carson Hilbert 39-yard field goal (Drive: 7 plays, 24 yards, 2:28; Louisville 44–20)

Statistics	FSU	LOU
First downs	22	21
Plays–yards	77–362	58–537
Rushes–yards	39–153	43–397
Passing yards	209	140
Passing: comp–att–int	21–38–1	11–15–0
Turnovers	1	0
Time of possession	31:18	28:42

Team	Category	Player	Statistics
Florida State	Passing	Ashton Daniels	21–37, 209 yards, 2 TD, INT
Florida State	Rushing	Ousmane Kromah	19 carries, 88 yards
Florida State	Receiving	Micahi Danzy	4 receptions, 50 yards, 2 TD
Louisville	Passing	Lincoln Kienholz	11–15, 140 yards
Louisville	Rushing	Isaac Brown	17 carries, 235 yards, 2 TD
Louisville	Receiving	Lawayne McCoy	3 receptions, 78 yards

=== at No. 3 Miami (FL) ===
Florida State Seminoles (3–3) at No. 3 Miami Hurricanes (5–0) – Game summary

Quarter	1	2	3	4	OT	2OT	Total
Seminoles	0	14	7	7	7	0	35
No. 3 Hurricanes	7	7	0	14	7	8	43

at Hard Rock Stadium • Miami Gardens, Florida

- Date: October 17
- Game time: 7:00 p.m.
- Game weather: Rain • Temperature: 77 °F (25 °C) • Wind: N at 7 miles per hour (11 km/h)
- Game attendance: 66,790
- Referee: Darryl DeBerry
- TV announcers (ESPN): Tom Hart, Roddy Jones, and Quint Kessenich
- Box Score, Recap

Game information

First Quarter

- MIA: M. Fletcher Jr. run for 7 yds, for a TD (J. Weinberg KICK); 11 plays, 86 yards, 5:01

Second Quarter

- FSU: A. Daniels pass to D. Riles for 23 yds, for a TD (G. Panikowski KICK); 7 plays, 53 yards, 3:01
- MIA: D. Mensah pass to Ma. Toney for 14 yds, for a TD (J. Weinberg KICK); 6 plays, 80 yards, 3:35
- FSU: A. Daniels run for 2 yds, for a TD (G. Panikowski KICK); 3 plays, 15 yards, 0:00

Third Quarter

- FSU: Wisner,Quintrevion 28 yd pass from Daniels,Ashton (Panikowski,Gabe kick); 4 plays, 58 yards, TOP 01:36

Fourth Quarter

- MIA: Mallory,Javian 3 yd run (Weinberg,Jake kick); 4 plays, 72 yards, TOP 01:58
- MIA: Lofton,Elija 3 yd pass from Mensah,Darian (Weinberg,Jake kick); 10 plays, 61 yards, TOP 06:08

FSU: Robinson,Duce 75 yd pass from Daniels,Ashton (Panikowski,Gabe kick); 1 plays, 75 yards, TOP 00:10

Overtime

- FSU: Robinson,Duce 20 yd pass from Daniels,Ashton (Panikowski,Gabe kick); 3 plays, 25 yards, TOP 00:00
- MIA: Mallory,Javian 25 yd run (Weinberg,Jake kick); 2 plays, 25 yards, TOP 00:00

2OT

- MIA: Toney,Malachi 3 yd pass from Mensah,Darian (Barkate,Cooper pass); 3 plays, 25 yards, TOP 00:00

Statistics	FSU	MIA
First downs	19	26
Plays–yards	64–443	78–583
Rushes–yards	34–138	44–257
Passing yards	305	326
Passing: comp–att–int	16–30–1	23–34–1
Turnovers	2	1
Time of possession	22:40	37:20

Team	Category	Player	Statistics
Florida State	Passing	Ashton Daniels	15–28, 298 yards, 4 TD, 1 INT
Florida State	Rushing	Quintrevion Wisner	9 carries, 63 yards
Florida State	Receiving	Duce Robinson	5 receptions, 113 yards, 2 TD
Miami (FL)	Passing	Darian Mensah	23–34, 326 yards, 3 TD, 1 INT
Miami (FL)	Rushing	Javian Mallory	13 carries, 108 yards, 2 TD
Miami (FL)	Receiving	Malachi Toney	11 receptions, 154 yards, 2 TD

=== vs. Clemson ===
Clemson Tigers (4–3) at Florida State Seminoles (3–4) – Game summary

Quarter	1	2	3	4	Total
Tigers	10	13	3	10	36
Seminoles	7	3	0	14	24

at Doak Campbell Stadium • Tallahassee, Florida

- Date: October 31
- Game time: 7:00 p.m.
- Game weather: Cloudy • Temperature: 79 °F (26 °C) • Wind: NE at 17 miles per hour (27 km/h)
- Game attendance: 60,472
- Referee: Jerry Magallanes
- TV announcers (ACC Network): Wes Durham, Max Browne, and Madison Fitzpatrick
- Box Score, Recap

Game information

First Quarter

- CLEM: T. Reynolds pass to C. Bentancur for 18 yds, for a TD (N. Hauser KICK); 2 plays, 30 yards, 0:34
- FSU: A. Daniels pass to M. Danzy for 46 yds, for a TD (G. Panikowski KICK); 2 plays, 67 yards, 0:40
- CLEM: N. Hauser 35 yd FG; 10 plays, 43 yards, 4:59

Second Quarter

- FSU: G. Panikowski 35 yd FG; 9 plays, 60 yards, 4:01
- CLEM: N. Hauser 35 yd FG; 13 plays, 58 yards, 5:33
- CLEM: T. Reynolds pass to O. Patt-Henry for 4 yds, for a TD; 11 plays, 51 yards, 3:02
- CLEM: N. Hauser 50 yd FG; 4 plays, 8 yards, 0:52

Third Quarter

- CLEM: N. Hauser 46 yd FG; 6 plays, 25 yards, 1:42

Fourth Quarter

- CLEM: N. Hauser 49 yd FG; 9 plays, 36 yards, 3:49
- FSU: A. Daniels run for 13 yds, for a TD (A. Daniels pass to D. Riles GOOD for Two-Point Conversion); 5 plays, 75 yards, 2:12
- FSU: A. Daniels pass to J. Lopez for 41 yds, for a TD (Two-Point Conversion failed); 3 plays, 54 yards, 0:59
- CLEM: T. Reynolds run for 79 yds, for a TD (N. Hauser KICK); 3 plays, 77 yards, 2:07

Statistics	CLEM	FSU
First downs	19	21
Plays–yards	76–351	62–415
Rushes–yards	44–162	29–65
Passing yards	189	350
Passing: comp–att–int	18–32–0	21–33–3
Turnovers	0	4
Time of possession	34:11	25:49

Team	Category	Player	Statistics
Clemson	Passing	Tait Reynolds	18–32, 189 yards, 2 TD
Clemson	Rushing	Tait Reynolds	14 carries, 85 yards, 1 TD
Clemson	Receiving	Tyler Brown	5 receptions, 74 yards
Florida State	Passing	Ashton Daniels	21–33, 350 yards, 2 TD, 3 INT
Florida State	Rushing	Quintrevion Wisner	13 carries, 43 yards
Florida State	Receiving	Micahi Danzy	4 receptions, 108 yards, 1 TD

=== at Boston College ===
Florida State Seminoles (3–5) at Boston College Eagles (4–4) – Game summary

Quarter	1	2	3	4	Total
Seminoles	0	21	0	10	31
Eagles	10	7	7	0	24

at Alumni Stadium • Chestnut Hill, Massachusetts

- Date: November 7
- Game time: 12:00 p.m.
- Game weather: Rain • Temperature: 57 °F (14 °C) • Wind: S at 6 miles per hour (9.7 km/h)
- Game attendance: 37,155
- Referee: Tim Hedgepeth
- TV announcers (ACC Network): Jorge Sedano, Dave Clawson, and Annabelle Hasselbeck
- Box Score, Recap

Game information

First Quarter

- BC - Bo MacCormack III 6 yd run (Luca Lombardo kick), 13 plays, 75 yards, TOP 07:22
- BC - Luca Lombardo 48 yd field goal, 7 plays, 13 yards, TOP 02:57

Second Quarter

- FSU - Ashton Daniels 4 yd run (Gabe Panikowski kick), 5 plays, 29 yards, TOP 01:38
- BC - Nedrick Boldin Jr. 29 yd pass from Mason McKenzie (Luca Lombardo kick), 8 plays, 75 yards, TOP 04:42
- FSU - Amari Thomas 20 yd run (Gabe Panikowski kick), 8 plays, 75 yards, TOP 03:21
- FSU - Gabe Panikowski 1 yd run (Gabe Panikowski kick), 12 plays, 63 yards, TOP 03:49

Third Quarter

- BC - Javarius Green 2 yd pass from Mason McKenzie (Luca Lombardo kick), 6 plays, 51 yards, TOP 03:30

Fourth Quarter

- FSU - Gabe Panikowski 22 yd field goal, 14 plays, 71 yards, TOP 05:49
- FSU - Amari Thomas 11 yd run (Gabe Panikowski kick), 14 plays, 90 yards, TOP 08:16

Statistics	FSU	BC
First downs	22	19
Plays–yards	71–380	61–320
Rushes–yards	45–202	30–148
Passing yards	178	172
Passing: comp–att–int	15–26–1	17–31–2
Turnovers	1	2
Time of possession	30:18	29:42

Team	Category	Player	Statistics
Florida State	Passing	Ashton Daniels	15–26, 178 yards, 1 INT
Florida State	Rushing	Amari Thomas	19 carries, 98 yards, 2 TD
Florida State	Receiving	Micahi Danzy	7 receptions, 86 yards
Boston College	Passing	Mason McKenzie	15–27, 166 yards, 2 TD, 1 INT
Boston College	Rushing	Bo Maccormack, III	16 carries, 105 yards, 1 TD
Boston College	Receiving	Nedrick Boldin, Jr.	2 receptions, 49 yards, 1 TD

=== at Pittsburgh ===
Florida State Seminoles (4–5) at Pittsburgh Panthers (6–3) – Game summary

Quarter	1	2	3	4	Total
Seminoles	3	3	7	3	16
Panthers	0	7	3	0	10

at Acrisure Stadium • Pittsburgh, Pennsylvania

- Date: November 13
- Game time: 7:00 p.m.
- Game weather: Cloudy • Temperature: 40 °F (4 °C) • Wind: NW at 7 miles per hour (11 km/h)
- Game attendance: 45,734
- Referee: Jon Noli
- TV announcers (ESPN): Mike Monaco, Jordan Rodgers, and Dana Boyle
- Box Score, Recap

Game information

First Quarter

- FSU: Gabe Panikowski 37 yd FG GOOD; 10 plays, 56 yards, 3:43. Seminoles 3–0

Second Quarter

- FSU: Gabe Panikowski 27 yd FG GOOD; 11 plays, 83 yards, 5:50. Seminoles 6–0
- PITT: Corey Dailey pass to Ja'Kyrian Turner for 11 yds, for a TD (Antonio Chadha KICK); 10 plays, 85 yards, 5:12. Panthers 7–6

Third Quarter

- FSU: Amari Thomas run for 1 yd, for a TD (Gabe Panikowski KICK); 5 plays, 32 yards, 2:14. Seminoles 13–7
- PITT: Antonio Chadha 34 yd FG GOOD; 9 plays, 36 yards, 3:26. Seminoles 13–10

Fourth Quarter

- FSU: Gabe Panikowski 47 yd FG GOOD; 6 plays, 23 yards, 2:17. Seminoles 16–10

Statistics	FSU	PITT
First downs	13	16
Plays–yards	57–260	71–306
Rushes–yards	33–97	37–149
Passing yards	163	157
Passing: comp–att–int	16–24–0	16–34–1
Turnovers	1	1
Time of possession	30:07	29:53

Team	Category	Player	Statistics
Florida State	Passing	Ashton Daniels	16–24, 163 yards
Florida State	Rushing	Amari Thomas	13 carries, 39 yards, 1 TD
Florida State	Receiving	Jasen Lopez	5 receptions, 72 yards
Pittsburgh	Passing	Corey Dailey	16–34, 157 yards, 1 TD, 1 INT
Pittsburgh	Rushing	Corey Dailey	9 carries, 58 yards
Pittsburgh	Receiving	Malik Knight	3 receptions, 55 yards

=== vs. NC State ===
NC State Wolfpack (4–6) at Florida State Seminoles (5–5) – Game summary

Quarter	1	2	3	4	Total
Wolfpack	7	0	7	14	28
Seminoles	7	3	0	0	10

at Doak Campbell Stadium • Tallahassee, Florida

- Date: November 21
- Game time: 3:30 p.m.
- Game weather: Rain • Temperature: 63 °F (17 °C) • Wind: N at 8 miles per hour (13 km/h)
- Game attendance: 60,143
- Referee: Nolan Dumas
- TV announcers (ACC Network): Jorge Sedano, Rodney McLeod Jr., and Annabelle Hasselbeck
- Box Score, Recap

Game information

First Quarter

- FSU - Parks,Zay 9 yd run (Panikowski,Gabe kick), 5 plays, 75 yards, TOP 02:09
- NCST - Johnson,Darius 1 yd pass from Bailey,CJ (Vinesett,Kanoah kick) 11 plays, 75 yards, TOP 06:01

Second Quarter

- FSU - Panikowski,Gabe 54 yd field goal 8 plays, 34 yards, TOP 01:18

Third Quarter

- NCST - Desinor,Deandre 5 yd run (Vinesett,Kanoah kick), 10 plays, 86 yards, TOP 05:43

Fourth Quarter

- NCST - Douglas,Preston 17 yd pass from Bailey,CJ (Vinesett,Kanoah kick) 8 plays, 68 yards, TOP 03:50
- NCST - Dozier,Davion 13 yd pass from Bailey,CJ (Vinesett,Kanoah kick) 7 plays, 47 yards, TOP 03:14

Statistics	NCSU	FSU
First downs	25	15
Plays–yards	78–464	62–283
Rushes–yards	42–172	25–77
Passing yards	292	206
Passing: comp–att–int	23–36–0	19–37–2
Turnovers	0	2
Time of possession	36:38	23:22

Team	Category	Player	Statistics
NC State	Passing	CJ Bailey	23–36, 292 yards, 3 TD
NC State	Rushing	Davion Gause	25 carries, 134 yards
NC State	Receiving	Davion Gause	5 receptions, 71 yards
Florida State	Passing	Ashton Daniels	19–36, 206 yards, 2 INT
Florida State	Rushing	Zay Parks	8 carries, 35 yards, 1 TD
Florida State	Receiving	Micahi Danzy	3 receptions, 73 yards

=== vs. Florida (Sunshine Showdown) ===
Florida Gators (7–4) at Florida State Seminoles (5–6) – Game summary

Quarter	1	2	3	4	Total
Gators	0	0	0	0	0
Seminoles	0	0	0	0	0

at Doak Campbell Stadium • Tallahassee, Florida

- Date: November 27
- Game time: 3:30 p.m.
- TV: ABC

Statistics	FLA	FSU
First downs		
Plays–yards		
Rushes–yards		
Passing yards		
Passing: comp–att–int		
Time of possession		

Team	Category	Player	Statistics
Florida	Passing		
Florida	Rushing		
Florida	Receiving		
Florida State	Passing		
Florida State	Rushing		
Florida State	Receiving		

== Personnel ==
=== Roster ===
2026 Florida State Seminoles football team roster
Players
Coaches
Offense

Pos.	#	Name	Class
WR	0	Duce Robinson	Sr
RB	3	Samuel Singleton Jr.	Jr
QB	4	Dean DeNobile	Sr
RB	5	Quintrevion Wisner	Sr
TE	6	Desirrio Riles	Sr
WR	7	Jasen Lopez	Fr
WR	8	Micahi Danzy	So
QB	9	Kevin Sperry	Fr
WR	10	EJ White	Fr
WR	11	Devin Carter	Fr
QB	12	Michael Grant	Jr
WR	13	Tae'Shaun Gelsey	Fr
QB	14	Ashton Daniels	Sr
WR	15	Jayvan Boggs	So
QB	16	Jaden O'Neal	Fr
TE	18	Landen Thomas	Jr
WR	19	Darryon Williams	Fr
RB	21	Zay Parks	So
RB	22	Gemari Sands	Jr
TE	23	Chase Loftin	Fr
RB	24	Amari Thomas	Fr
RB	32	Ousmane Kromah	So
TE	44	Gavin Markey	Fr
OL	51	Paul Bowling	So
OL	52	Chavez Thompson	Fr
OL	54	Chastan Brown	Fr
OL	55	Bradyn Joiner	Jr
OL	56	Steven Pickard Jr.	Fr
OL	58	Luke Francis Jr.	Fr
OL	59	Steven Moore	Jr
OL	63	Jakobe Green	Fr
OL	65	Andre' Otto	Jr
OL	69	Mike Ionata	Fr
OL	71	Nate Pabst	Sr
OL	74	Jonathan Daniels	So
OL	75	Sean Poret	Fr
OL	77	Xavier Chaplin	Sr
OL	78	Jayden Todd	So
OL	79	Chimdia Nwaiwu	Jr
TE	80	Corbyn Fordham	Fr
WR	82	Teriq Mallory	Fr
TE	89	Greyson Labiad	Sr

Defense

Pos.	#	Name	Class
DB	0	Quindarrius Jones	Sr
DL	1	Darryll Desir	So
DL	3	Mandrell Desir	So
DB	4	Charles Lester III	So
DL	5	Daniel Lyons	Sr
DB	6	Ja'Bril Rawls	Jr
DB	7	Ashlynd Barker	Sr
DL	8	Deante McCray	Sr
LB	9	Omar Graham Jr.	Sr
LB	10	Chris Jones	Jr
DB	11	CJ Richard Jr.	So
DB	12	Nehemiah Chandler	So
DL	13	Deamontae Diggs	Sr
DB	14	Ma'Khi Jones	So
DL	15	Rylan Kennedy	Sr
DB	16	Karson Hobbs	Jr
DB	18	Jamari Howard	So
DB	19	Jarvis Boatwright	So
LB	20	Blake Nichelson	Sr
DB	21	Max Redmon	Fr
DB	22	Zae Thomas	Fr
DB	23	Chuck Kennon	Fr
DB	24	K.J. Kirkland	Jr
DB	26	Ricky Knight III	So
DB	27	Jordan Crutchfield	Fr
LB	28	Mikai Gbayor	Sr
LB	29	Caleb LaVallee	Jr
LB	30	Izayia Williams	Fr
LB	31	Karon Maycock	Fr
LB	32	Jalen Anderson	Jr
DB	33	Antonio Cromartie Jr.	Fr
LB	35	Ethan Pritchard	Fr
DB	37	Tre Bell III	Fr
LB	38	Daylen Green	Fr
LB	41	AJ Cottrill	Sr
LB	42	Chris Thomas	Jr
LB	45	Noah LaVallee	Fr
DL	46	Chris Carbin	Fr
DB	47	Donny Hiebert	Sr
LB	53	Brandon Torres	Jr
DL	54	Earnest Rankins	Fr
DL	55	Kevin Wynn	Fr
DL	88	Jordan Sanders	Sr
DL	90	Jaemin Pinckney	Fr
DL	91	Cam Brooks	Fr
DL	94	Franklin Whitley	Fr
DL	96	Tylon Lee	Fr
DL	98	Wihtlley Cadeau	Fr

Special teams

Pos.	#	Name	Class
P	36	Daniel Hughes	Jr
K	39	Gabe Panikowski	Sr
LS	48	Caleb Bowers	Sr
LS	53	Alex Nocco	Fr
P	85	Ethan Post	Fr
P	87	Carter Jula	So
K	93	Conor McAneney	So

Head coach

- Mike Norvell (games 1-8)

Coordinators/assistant coaches

- Tom Herman - Assistant to the head coach
- Tony White – Defensive coordinator (games 1-8)
- Tim Harris Jr. – Offensive coordinator/wide receivers
- Chris Thomsen – Deputy head coach/tight ends
- Blue Adams – Cornerbacks
- Evan Cooper – Safeties (games 1-8)
- Herb Hand – Offensive line
- Terrance Knighton – Defensive line
- Kam Martin – Running backs
- Adam Scheier – Special teams coordinator
- Ernie Sims – Linebackers & Defensive coordinator (games 9-12)
- Austin Tucker – Quarterbacks
- Nick Williams – Edges/pass rush specialist
- Odell Haggins – Associate head coach
- Gabe Fertitta – Director of Football Strategy/offensive assistant
- Greg Moss – Assistant defensive backs
- Jake Rothschiller – Assistant linebackers
- Manrey Saint-Amour – Assistant offensive line
- Jesse Stone – Assistant quarterbacks
- Brady White – Assistant wide receivers
- Paul Pasqualoni – Defensive analyst (games 10-12)

Legend

- (C) Team captain
- (S) Suspended
- (I) Ineligible
- Injured
- Redshirt

Roster

== Honors ==
Player	Award	Ref.
Duce Robinson	Shriners Children's East-West Bowl Offensive Player of the Week; Campbell Trophy finalist Jason Witten Collegiate Man of the Year semifinalist Pre-season All-American; Pre-season All-ACC; Maxwell Award watchlist Walter Camp Award watchlist Biletnikoff Award watchlist Wuerffel Trophy watchlist Jason Witten Collegiate Man of the Year watchlist	
Gabe Panikowski	Lou Groza Award watchlist	
Daniel Hughes	Ray Guy Award watchlist	
Ousmane Kromah	Doak Walker Award watchlist	
Quintrevion Wisner	Doak Walker Award watchlist Earl Campbell Tyler Rose Award watchlist	
Ja'Bril Rawls	Chuck Bednarik Award watchlist	
Samuel Singleton, Jr.	ACC Receiver of the Week	
André Otto	ACC Offensive Lineman of the Week	
Ashton Daniels	Davey O'Brien - Great 8 Davey O'Brien National Co-Quarterback of the Week; ACC Quarterback of the Week; Davey O'Brien Award mid-season watchlist	
Xavier Chaplin	ACC Offensive Lineman of the Week	
Amari Thomas	ACC Rookie of the Week	
Caleb Bowers	Patrick Mannelly Award semifinalist	
