= 2006 Emerald Bowl =

- Florida State win vacated by the NCAA in 2010
Florida State Seminoles	UCLA Bruins
(6–6)	(7–5)
ACC	Pac-10
44	27
Head coach: Bobby Bowden	Head coach: Karl Dorrell
	AP / Coaches / BCS; NR / NR / 25
	1	2	3	4	Total
Florida State	7	6	10	21	44
UCLA	10	10	7	0	27
- Date: December 27, 2006
- Season: 2006
- Stadium: AT&T Park
- Location: San Francisco, California
- MVP: Offensive: Lorenzo Booker (FSU); Defensive: Tony Carter (FSU)
- Referee: Steve Barth (C-USA)
- Attendance: 40,331

United States TV coverage
- Network: ESPN
- Announcers: Dan Fouts, Tim Brant, & Jack Arute

The 2006 Emerald Bowl, one of the 2006–07 NCAA football bowl games, was played on December 27, 2006, at AT&T Park in San Francisco, California. The fifth edition of the Emerald Bowl, it featured the UCLA Bruins and the Florida State Seminoles.

== Game summary ==
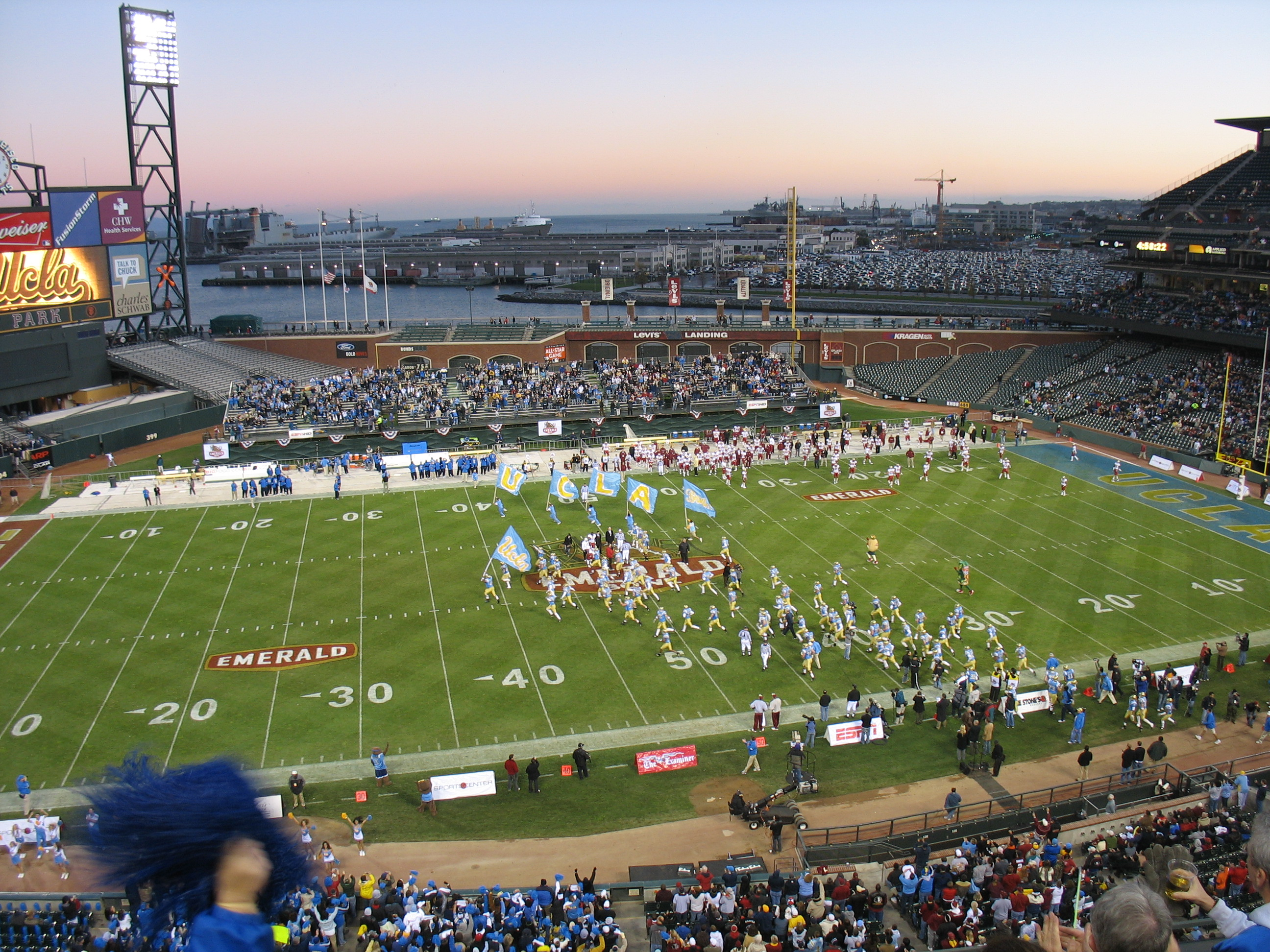
Emerald Bowl, UCLA vs FSU, 2006

Florida State scored first following a 25-yard touchdown run by Lorenzo Booker, making it 7–0 FSU. UCLA responded just 34 seconds later after quarterback Patrick Cowan threw a 78-yard touchdown pass to wide receiver Brandon Breazell to tie the game at 7–7. With 20 seconds left in the first quarter, Justin Medlock kicked a 46-yard field goal to put the Bruins up 10–7.

With 12:20 left in the half, Gary Cismesia kicked a 39-yard field goal to tie the game at 10. With 8:40 left in the half, Cowan found wide receiver Junior Taylor for a 7-yard touchdown pass, to put UCLA up 17–10. With 2:34 left in the first half, Medlock nailed a 19-yard field goal, increasing UCLA's lead to 20–10. Florida State answered with a 21-yard field goal from Gary Cismesia before halftime, making it 20–13 UCLA.

In the third quarter, Cismesia kicked a 36-yard field goal, pulling FSU to within 20–16. With 8:58 left in the quarter, Lawrence Timmons recovered a blocked punt, and returned it 25 yards for a touchdown, giving FSU a 23–20 lead. Chane Moline later scored on an 8-yard touchdown run, as UCLA reclaimed the lead at 27–23.

In the fourth quarter, Drew Weatherford threw a 30-yard touchdown pass to wide receiver Greg Carr, and Florida State took a 30–27 lead with 9:46 left in the game. Lorenzo Booker added a three-yard touchdown run with 6:17 left to increase the lead to 37–27. With 5:04 left, Florida State sealed the deal with an 86-yard interception return by cornerback Tony Carter, making the final score 44–27 FSU.

== Aftermath ==
On February 8, 2010, as punishment for the Florida State University academic-athletic scandal, Florida State University agreed to accept NCAA sanctions against its athletic programs, and agreed to vacate 12 football victories, including the 2006 Emerald Bowl victory over UCLA. Florida State stated their intention to return the championship trophy.
