= McGrew (surname) =

McGrew is a surname, and may refer to:

- James McGrew (1813–1910), American politician, merchant, banker and hospital director
- John McGrew (circa 1910 – 1999), American animator, painter and musician
- Lance McGrew, American NASCAR crew chief
- Larry McGrew (1957–2004), retired American football linebacker
- Reggie McGrew (born 1976), American football defensive tackle
- Sam McGrew (born 1984), former American football linebacker
