= Lawrence Timmons =

American football player (born 1986)

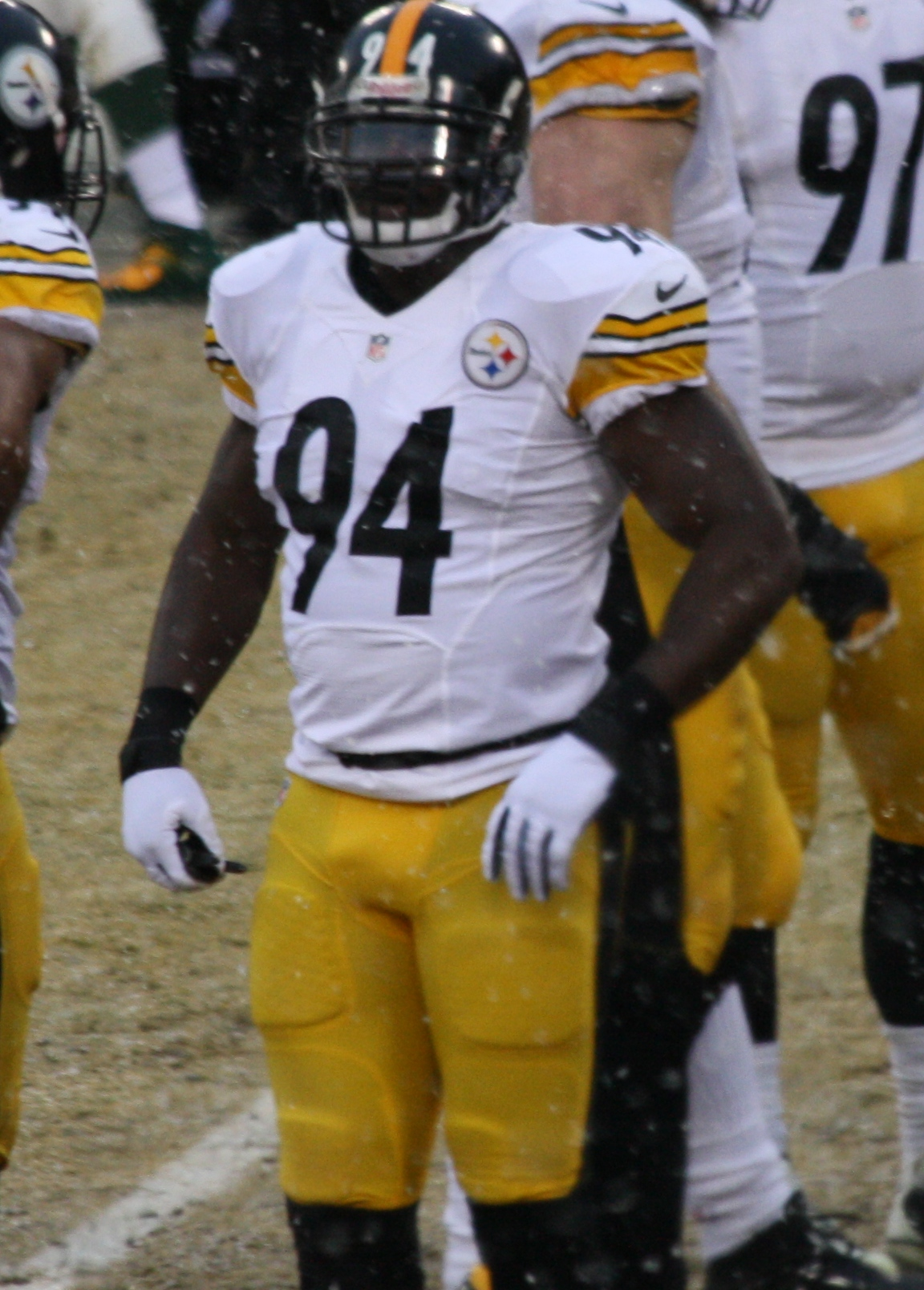
- Timmons with the Pittsburgh Steelers in 2013

No. 94
- Position: Linebacker

Personal information
- Born: May 14, 1986 (age 40); Florence, South Carolina, U.S.
- Listed height: 6 ft 1 in (1.85 m)
- Listed weight: 242 lb (110 kg)

Career information
- High school: Wilson (Florence)
- College: Florida State (2004–2006)
- NFL draft: 2007: 1st round, 15th overall pick

Career history
- Pittsburgh Steelers (2007–2016); Miami Dolphins (2017)

Awards and highlights
- Super Bowl champion (XLIII); Second-team All-Pro (2014); Pro Bowl (2014); PFWA All-Rookie Team (2007)

Career NFL statistics
- Total tackles: 1,067
- Sacks: 35.5
- Forced fumbles: 13
- Fumble recoveries: 7
- Interceptions: 12
- Defensive touchdowns: 1
- Stats at Pro Football Reference

Lawrence Olajuwon Timmons (born May 14, 1986) is an American former professional football player who was a linebacker in the National Football League (NFL). He was selected by the Pittsburgh Steelers in the first round of the 2007 NFL draft. He won Super Bowl XLIII with the Steelers the following year, and played in Super Bowl XLV two years later. He played college football for the Florida State Seminoles.

== Early life ==
Timmons attended Wilson High School in Florence, South Carolina, where he played football and ran track. In football, he played tight end on offense and linebacker on defense. He was teammates with Justin Durant until his junior year. During his senior year, Timmons registered over 150 tackles and two sacks, while also catching 47 passes for over 800 yards and five touchdowns as a tight end, which earned him all-state first-team honors. He was awarded the Defensive Player of the Year and received Super Prep Elite 50 honors, as well as selected to play in the 2003 East-West Shrine Game.

In track & field, Timmons competed in the long jump event. He recorded a career-best leap of 6.55 meters at the 2003 SCHSL State Championships, where he placed sixth in the finals. He was also a member of the 4 × 100 m and 4 × 200 m relay squads, and was timed at 4.6 seconds in the 40-yard dash.

Regarded as a four-star recruit by Rivals.com, Timmons was ranked as the No. 5 outside linebacker prospect in the nation. He took official visits to North Carolina, Florida State, Florida, and Tennessee, before committing to the Seminoles.

== College career ==
In his true freshman year, Timmons played in all 12 games including the Seminoles' Gator Bowl victory over West Virginia, although only limited minutes mainly on special teams and as a backup linebacker. He recorded 12 tackles, 11 of which were unassisted, which ranked second among the Seminole freshmen behind Jae Thaxton. A season-high three tackles came against Alabama–Birmingham.

As a sophomore, Timmons ranked second on the Seminoles' depth chart at strongside linebacker behind Ernie Sims. He played in all 13 games, both at linebacker and on special teams, as well as defensive end in some third-and-long formations. Timmons finished the year with 35 tackles (17 solo), which ranked third on the team (behind Buster Davis and Sam McGrew), as well as three quarterback sacks, which also was third-best among all Seminoles (behind Kamerion Wimbley and Marcello Church). His season-best performance came in the ACC Championship Game against Virginia Tech, when he recorded eight tackles, six solo, two quarterback sacks and two QB hurries.

After Sims decided to forgo his senior season, Timmons took over as the starter at strongside linebacker. He had a productive season, recording 79 tackles and five sacks, and was honored with All-American third-team and All-Atlantic Coast Conference first-team. He finished his college career with 126 tackles and eight sacks.

== Professional career ==
Pre-draft measurables
Height	Weight	Arm length	Hand span	40-yard dash	10-yard split	20-yard split	20-yard shuttle	Three-cone drill	Vertical jump	Broad jump	Bench press
6 ft 0 7/8 in (1.85 m)	234 lb (106 kg)	33 in (0.84 m)	9 1/4 in (0.23 m)	4.63 s	1.56 s	2.69 s	4.32 s	6.89 s	35 in (0.89 m)	10 ft 3 in (3.12 m)	25 reps
All values from NFL Combine/Pro Day

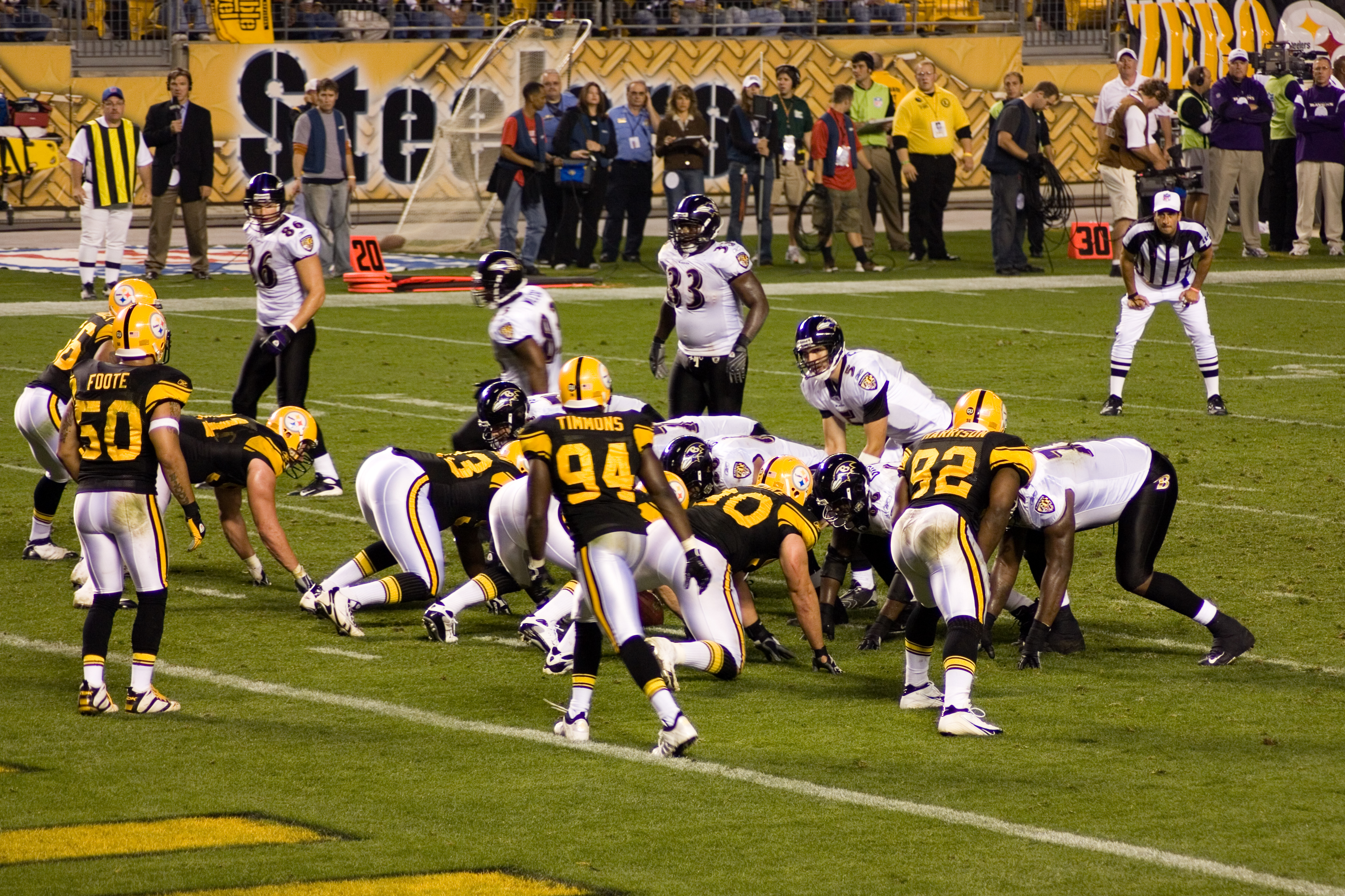
Timmons (94) playing against the Baltimore Ravens in 2008.

=== Pittsburgh Steelers ===
==== 2007 ====
Timmons was selected by the Pittsburgh Steelers in the first round with the 15th overall pick in the 2007 NFL draft. He was the first player drafted under head coach Mike Tomlin. He began his rookie season as the backup right outside linebacker to James Harrison. He made his professional debut in the Steelers' season opener against the Cleveland Browns, making one tackle in the Steelers' victory. The following week, he made a season-high two solo tackles during a 26–3 victory over the Buffalo Bills. As a rookie, he was rarely used as a rotational player and on special teams but appeared in all 16 regular-season contests. He made 13 tackles throughout his rookie season.

==== 2008 ====
The following season, he was moved over to right inside linebacker, backing up veteran Larry Foote on a Steelers defensive linebacking corps with veteran depth and talent that included himself, Foote, Harrison, LaMarr Woodley, and James Farrior. In the season opener, he made four solo tackles in a 38–17 victory over the Houston Texans. On September 29, 2008, Timmons made four combined tackles, a pass deflection, and sacked Baltimore Ravens' quarterback Joe Flacco for his first career sack, as the Steelers defeated them 23–20 in overtime on Monday Night Football. In Week 7, he had his best game of the season statistically, finishing with a season-high ten combined tackles and had a season-high two sacks after getting to Bengals' quarterback Ryan Fitzpatrick twice during the Steelers' 38–10 victory. On November 3, Timmons earned his first career start in a victory over the Washington Redskins during Monday Night Football and finished the game with four combined tackles.

On November 30, he made four tackles and intercepted Patriots's quarterback Matt Cassel for his first career interception during the Steelers' 33–10 victory. On January 11, 2009, he played in his first career playoff game when the Steelers defeated the San Diego Chargers 35–24 in the wild card round. He finished the game with six combined tackles, three of them being solo. The Steelers defeated the Baltimore Ravens in the AFC Championship and went on to play the Arizona Cardinals in Super Bowl XLIII. In his first Super Bowl, Timmons recorded five tackle, helping his team win 27–23. He finished his second season with 65 tackles, 5.0 sacks and an interception, while starting three games and playing in all 16 regular-season contests.

==== 2009 ====
Timmons took over as starter for the 2009 season following the release of Larry Foote, who asked for his release, foreseeing Timmons's future emergence as the starter and receiving increased playing time. The latter was slated as the Steelers' starting right inside linebacker to begin the season but missed the season opener against the Tennessee Titans. He returned the following week, making three solo tackles and two pass deflections during a 14–17 loss to the Chicago Bears. The next game, he made his first start of the season during a loss to the Bengals and finished the game with three combined tackles and a pass deflection. During Week 5, Timmons made five tackles and forced two fumbles as the Steelers routed the Cleveland Browns 27–14. He finished the 2009 season with a total of 78 combined tackles, 7.0 sacks, 4 pass deflections, and 3 forced fumbles in 14 games with 13 starts.

==== 2010 ====
Timmons started in the season opener against the Atlanta Falcons and finished the 15–9 victory with 11 tackles. The next week, he recorded a career-high 15 combined tackles (12 solo) and a forced fumble during a win over the Tennessee Titans.

In 2010, he had a career year for the Steelers and finished off the season as the highest-rated inside linebacker by Pro Football Focus. He led the team with 135 tackles, and recorded 3.0 sacks, 9 pass deflections, 2 forced fumbles and 2 interceptions. The Steelers finished with the No. 1 run defense in the league, allowing only 63.2 yards per game. Timmons started 15 of the 16 regular season games, while playing in all of them.

At the end of the 2010 season, Timmons and the Steelers appeared in Super Bowl XLV against the Green Bay Packers. He was a starter and had three total tackles in the 31–25 loss.

==== 2011 ====
On August 23, 2011, the Steelers gave Timmons a five-year, $47.79 million contract extension, which included $11 million guaranteed and a signing bonus of $10 million for his performance throughout the 2010 NFL season. His rookie deal expired at the end of the 2010 season and he was a free agent; however, the Steelers signed him to an extension after the NFL lockout was resolved. In the season opener against the Ravens, he collected a season-high 12 tackles as the Steelers lost 7–35. Timmons' numbers dropped from the previous season due to his moving from his normal inside linebacker position to outside linebacker, filling in for an injured James Harrison. He recorded 93 tackles, 2.0 sacks, 2 forced fumbles, and an interception.

==== 2012 ====
He started the season making five solo tackles in a 19–31 loss to the Denver Broncos. During a Week 6 contest against the Tennessee Titans, he made six total tackles and intercepted Titans' quarterback Matt Hasselbeck for his first pick of the season. On November 25, 2012, Timmons racked up ten combined tackles and intercepted Browns' quarterback Brandon Weeden, and scored a 52-yard touchdown for the first of his career. The Steelers went on to lose to the Browns 14–20. During Week 14, he made a season-high 11 solo tackles in a loss to the San Diego Chargers. He finished his sixth NFL season with a total of 106 tackles, 6.0 sacks, 2 forced fumbles and a career-high 3 interceptions. This was his first season starting all 16 regular season contests.

==== 2013 ====
On October 20, 2013, Timmons collected a season-high 17 tackles (12 solo) during a 17–13 victory over the Baltimore Ravens.

That season, Timmons led the team with 126 tackles, 3.0 sacks, 2 interceptions, and a forced fumble. This was the second time in the last 3 seasons that he led the team in tackles. He started all 16 games for the second consecutive year.

==== 2014 ====
On September 11, 2014, he made 12 total tackles during a 6–26 loss to the Baltimore Ravens. On October 20, Timmons made a season-high 11 solo tackles and an assisted tackle against the Houston Texans. During a Week 10 loss to the Jets, he collected a season-high 13 combined tackles. On December 21, Timmons tied his season-high of 13 combined tackles in a 20–12 victory over the Kansas City Chiefs.

On December 23, his efforts were recognized for having another excellent season and he was named to his first career Pro Bowl. On January 2, 2015, Lawrence Timmons was named Second-team All-Pro for the first time of his career. He finished the 2014 season with 132 combined tackles, 87 solo tackles, and 2.0 sacks. He played in all 16 games for the third consecutive season.

==== 2015 ====
During Week 4 of the 2015 season, Timmons had a season-high 11 tackles and sacked Ravens' quarterback Joe Flacco for his first of the season during a 20–23 loss to the Baltimore Ravens. On October 18, 2015, he had six combined tackles and intercepted quarterback Carson Palmer in a 25–13 win over the Arizona Cardinals. On January 3, 2016, he recorded ten combined tackles and a season-high 1.5 sacks in a 28–12 win over the Cleveland Browns. Timmons finished the season with 119 combined tackles, 77 solo tackles, 5.0 sacks, one interception, and a forced fumble.

The Pittsburgh Steelers finished the season 10–6 and received a playoff berth. On January 9, 2016, Timmons recorded four combined tackles in an 18–16 AFC Wild Card victory over the Cincinnati Bengals. On January 17, he made six combined tackles in a 23–16 divisional loss to the eventual Super Bowl champions, the Denver Broncos.

==== 2016 ====
On October 20, 2016, the Steelers lost to the New England Patriots 27–16 and Timmons racked up a season-high 11 solo tackles during the game. In Week 11, Timmons recorded eight combined tackles and made his first sack of the season in a 24–9 victory over the Cleveland Browns. During Week 13, he made seven combined tackles and intercepted New York Giants' quarterback Eli Manning and returned it 58-yards. He finished the season with 114 combined tackles, 2.5 sacks, 5 pass deflections, two interceptions, and a forced fumble in 16 games with 16 starts.

On January 8, 2017, Timmons recorded a team-leading 14 combined tackles and sacked quarterback Matt Moore twice in a 30–12 AFC Wild Card Round victory over the Miami Dolphins. On January 22, Timmons repeated a team-leading performance of 14 combined tackles in a 36–17 AFC Championship loss to the eventual Super Bowl champions, the New England Patriots.

=== Miami Dolphins ===
On March 10, 2017, Timmons signed a two-year, $12 million contract with the Miami Dolphins.

On September 19, the Dolphins suspended Timmons indefinitely after he went missing before the team's Week 2 match-up against the Los Angeles Chargers. It was revealed that Timmons was reported missing from the team's hotel in Los Angeles, and the Dolphins filed a missing persons report. He was later found at the Los Angeles International Airport, but was headed to see his daughter who lives in Pennsylvania. On September 26, Timmons was reinstated by the team.

On March 13, 2018, Timmons was released by the Dolphins.

== NFL career statistics ==
Legend
	Won the Super Bowl
**Bold**	Career high

Year	Team	GP	Tackles				Fumbles			Interceptions					
Year	Team	GP	Cmb	Solo	Ast	Sck	FF	FR	Yds	Int	Yds	Avg	Lng	TD	PD
2007	PIT	16	15	13	2	0.0	0	**2**	5	0	0	0.0	0	0	0
2008	PIT	16	65	43	22	5.0	1	1	0	1	**89**	**89.0**	**89**	0	3
2009	PIT	14	78	56	22	**7.0**	**4**	0	0	0	0	0.0	0	0	4
2010	PIT	16	**135**	**96**	39	3.0	2	**2**	0	2	5	2.5	5	0	**9**
2011	PIT	16	93	68	25	2.0	1	0	0	1	0	0.0	0	0	5
2012	PIT	16	106	75	31	6.0	2	1	1	**3**	80	27.7	53	**1**	5
2013	PIT	16	126	86	40	3.0	1	1	**29**	2	26	13.0	23	0	6
2014	PIT	16	132	87	**45**	2.0	0	0	0	0	0	0.0	0	0	1
2015	PIT	16	119	77	42	5.0	1	0	0	1	0	0.0	0	0	6
2016	PIT	16	114	78	36	2.5	1	0	0	2	74	37.0	54	0	5
2017	MIA	14	84	58	26	0.0	0	0	0	0	0	0.0	0	0	3
Career		172	1,067	737	330	35.5	13	7	35	12	274	22.8	89	1	46

== Personal life ==
Timmons's mother, a huge basketball fan, named Timmons after NBA legend and Basketball Hall of Famer Hakeem Olajuwon by giving him the middle name Olajuwon.

Timmons's son, Jay Timmons plays as a cornerback for the Ohio State Buckeyes.
