= 2007 Amsterdam Admirals season =

NFL Europa team season

- General manager: Stefaan Eskes
- Head coach: Bart Andrus
- Home stadium: Amsterdam ArenA; Olympisch Stadion

Results
- Record: 4–6
- Division place: 5th
- Playoffs: Did not qualify

The 2007 Amsterdam Admirals season was the 13th and final season for the franchise in the NFL Europa League (NFLEL). The team was led by head coach Bart Andrus in his seventh year, and played its home games at Amsterdam ArenA and Olympisch Stadion in Amsterdam, Netherlands. They finished the regular season in fifth place with a record of four wins and six losses. The National Football League (NFL) announced the closure of its European branch on June 29, ending the Admirals' 13-year existence.

== Offseason ==
=== Free agent draft ===
2007 Amsterdam Admirals NFLEL free agent draft selections
Draft order		Player name	Position	College
Round	Choice	Player name	Position	College
1	5	Marcus West	DE	Memphis
2	11	Norman Heuer	DT	Michigan
3	14	Tim Jones	DE	South Florida
4	23	Jacob Elimimian	CB	San Diego State
5	26	Tanuvasa Moe	LB	Hawaii
6	35	Sameeh McDonald	T	Rutgers
7	38	Deandre' Eiland	S	South Carolina
8	47	Donovan Raiola	C	Wisconsin
9	50	Jordan Hicks	DE	Abilene Christian
10	59	Sam McGrew	LB	Florida State
11	62	Marko Cavka	T	Sacramento State
12	71	Larry Croom	RB	UNLV
13	74	Abraham Elimimian	CB	Hawaii
14	83	Ben Hall	TE	Clemson
15	86	Lawrence Pinson	LB	Oklahoma State
16	95	Greg Carothers	LB	Washington
17	98	Larry Dibbles	DT	Texas
18	107	Phil Hawkins	G	Houston
19	110	Wendell Hunter	LB	California
20	119	Cole Downer	TE	Clemson
21	122	Jeremy Darveau	T	Louisville

== Personnel ==
=== Staff ===
2007 Amsterdam Admirals staff
Front office: General Manager – Stefaan Eskes; Head coaches: Head Coach – Bart Andrus; Offensive coaches: Offensive Coordinator/Offensive Line – Ron Heller; Running Backs – Gary Downs; Wide Receivers – Chip Beake; Tight Ends – Robert Hunt	Defensive coaches: Defensive Coordinator/Defensive Backs – Richard Kent; Defensive Line – Kanavis McGhee; National Coach/Linebackers – John Leijten; Assistant Linebackers – Doug Colman; Strength and conditioning: Strength and Conditioning – Tim Reynolds

=== Roster ===
2007 Amsterdam Admirals final roster
Quarterbacks: 7 Corey Bramlet; 8 Drew Olson; Running backs: 25 Larry Croom; 32 Cedric Humes; 21 Jonathan Smith; Wide receivers: 17 Chris Denney (IR); 89 Skyler Fulton; 81 Justin McCullum; 80 Richie Ross (IR); 19 Justin Surrency; 15 Harry Williams; Tight ends: 86 Cole Downer; 84 Ben Hall	Offensive linemen: 62 Brian Barthelmes C/G; 77 Marko Cavka T; 72 Phil Hawkins G (IR); 79 Sameeh McDonald T; 64 Tony Pape T; 53 Donovan Raiola C; 61 Tre' Stallings G; 68 Adam Stenavich G; Defensive linemen: 91 Sir Henry Anderson DT; 73 Willie Evans DE; 90 Norman Heuer DT; 94 Jordan Hicks DE (IR); 99 Tim Jones DE; 98 Lynn McGruder DT; 75 Alvin Smith DT (IR); 97 Marcus West DE	Linebackers: 44 Derrick Ballard OLB (IR); 43 Greg Carothers OLB; 40 Wendell Hunter OLB; 55 Kurt Kahui OLB (IR); 54 Sam McGrew MLB; 45 Tanuvasa Moe OLB (IR); 51 Lawrence Pinson OLB; 52 Tony Robinson OLB (IR); Defensive backs: 22 Robert Durham CB; 42 Deandre' Eiland SS; 37 Abe Elimimian CB; 25 Kevin Garrett CB (IR); 33 Erick Harris FS; 26 Grant Mason CB; 24 Levonne Rowan CB (IR); 27 Jamie Thompson FS; Special teams: 17 Jaret Johnson K; 9 Glenn Pakulak P	National players: 34 (England) Michael Andrew RB; 50 (Sweden) Carl-Johan Björk MLB; 38 (Russia) Sergey Ivanov SS; 18 (Japan) Noriaki Kinoshita WR; 3 (China) Chaoran Li K; 71 (Belgium) Patrice Majondo-Mwamba DT; 76 (Netherlands) Pascal Matla C/G; 56 (Netherlands) Akwasi Mensah OLB; 88 (France) Yoan Schnee TE; 4 (China) Yalei Shen K; 92 (Russia) Artsem Yukhnovich DE; Rookies in italics

== Schedule ==
Week	Date	Opponent	Result	Record	Venue	Attendance	Recap
1	April 14	at Frankfurt Galaxy	L 14–30	0–1	Commerzbank-Arena	38,125	Recap
2	April 20	Rhein Fire	L 10–16	0–2	Amsterdam ArenA	14,611	Recap
3	April 20	at Berlin Thunder	W 14–10	1–2	Olympiastadion	11,942	Recap
4	May 6	Frankfurt Galaxy	W 19–17	2–2	Amsterdam ArenA	10,788	Recap
5	May 12	at Hamburg Sea Devils	L 17–24	2–3	AOL Arena	15,271	Recap
6	May 18	Hamburg Sea Devils	W 41–31	3–3	Amsterdam ArenA	9,384	Recap
7	May 25	Cologne Centurions	L 7–30	3–4	Amsterdam ArenA	11,714	Recap
8	June 3	at Rhein Fire	L 38–41	3–5	LTU arena	20,355	Recap
9	June 9	at Cologne Centurions	L 13–31	3–6	RheinEnergieStadion	12,878	Recap
10	June 15	Berlin Thunder	W 21–20	4–6	Olympisch Stadion	11,893	Recap

== Standings ==
NFL Europa League
Team	W	L	T	PCT	PF	PA	Home	Road	STK
Hamburg Sea Devils	7	3	0	.700	231	176	4–1	3–2	W4
Frankfurt Galaxy	7	3	0	.700	254	179	5–0	2–3	W1
Cologne Centurions	6	4	0	.600	205	172	2–3	4–1	L1
Rhein Fire	4	6	0	.400	166	212	2–3	2–3	L1
Amsterdam Admirals	4	6	0	.400	194	250	3–2	1–4	W1
Berlin Thunder	2	8	0	.200	146	207	0–5	2–3	L6

== Game summaries ==
=== Week 1: at Frankfurt Galaxy ===
Week One: Amsterdam Admirals at Frankfurt Galaxy

Quarter	1	2	3	4	Total
Amsterdam	8	6	0	0	14
Frankfurt	7	10	13	0	30

at Commerzbank-Arena, Frankfurt, Germany

- Date: Saturday, April 14
- Game time: 7:10 p.m. CEST
- Game attendance: 38,125
- Referee: Don Carey

=== Week 2: vs Rhein Fire ===
Week Two: Rhein Fire at Amsterdam Admirals

Quarter	1	2	3	4	Total
Rhein	3	3	7	3	16
Amsterdam	7	0	3	0	10

at Amsterdam ArenA, Amsterdam, Netherlands

- Date: Friday, April 20
- Game time: 8:05 p.m. CEST
- Game attendance: 14,611
- Referee: Terry Brown

=== Week 3: at Berlin Thunder ===
Week Three: Amsterdam Admirals at Berlin Thunder

Quarter	1	2	3	4	Total
Amsterdam	7	0	0	7	14
Berlin	0	0	10	0	10

at Olympic Stadium, Berlin, Germany

- Date: Saturday, April 28
- Game time: 6:06 p.m. CEST
- Game attendance: 11,942
- Referee: John Hussey

=== Week 4: vs Frankfurt Galaxy ===
Week Four: Frankfurt Galaxy at Amsterdam Admirals

Quarter	1	2	3	4	Total
Frankfurt	0	0	14	3	17
Amsterdam	7	12	0	0	19

at Amsterdam ArenA, Amsterdam, Netherlands

- Date: Sunday, May 6
- Game time: 3:05 p.m. CEST
- Game attendance: 10,788
- Referee: Tom Symonette

=== Week 5: at Hamburg Sea Devils ===
Week Five: Amsterdam Admirals at Hamburg Sea Devils

Quarter	1	2	3	4	Total
Amsterdam	0	0	14	3	17
Hamburg	7	10	0	7	24

at AOL Arena, Hamburg, Germany

- Date: Saturday, May 12
- Game time: 6:05 p.m. CEST
- Game attendance: 15,271
- Referee: Craig Wrolstad

=== Week 6: vs Hamburg Sea Devils ===
Week Six: Hamburg Sea Devils at Amsterdam Admirals

Quarter	1	2	3	4	Total
Hamburg	0	10	7	14	31
Amsterdam	7	20	7	7	41

at Amsterdam ArenA, Amsterdam, Netherlands

- Date: Friday, May 18
- Game time: 8:04 p.m. CEST
- Game attendance: 9,384
- Referee: Alberto Riveron

=== Week 7: vs Cologne Centurions ===
Week Seven: Cologne Centurions at Amsterdam Admirals

Quarter	1	2	3	4	Total
Cologne	7	9	14	0	30
Amsterdam	0	0	0	7	7

at Amsterdam ArenA, Amsterdam, Netherlands

- Date: Friday, May 25
- Game time: 8:05 p.m. CEST
- Game attendance: 11,714
- Referee: Don Carey

=== Week 8: at Rhein Fire ===
Week Eight: Amsterdam Admirals at Rhein Fire

Quarter	1	2	3	4	Total
Amsterdam	10	10	7	11	38
Rhein	14	10	7	10	41

at LTU arena, Düsseldorf, Germany

- Date: Sunday, June 3
- Game time: 4:06 p.m. CEST
- Game attendance: 20,355
- Referee: Carl Cheffers

=== Week 9: at Cologne Centurions ===
Week Nine: Amsterdam Admirals at Cologne Centurions

Quarter	1	2	3	4	Total
Amsterdam	3	7	3	0	13
Cologne	0	14	3	14	31

at RheinEnergieStadion, Cologne, Germany

- Date: Saturday, June 9
- Game time: 6:06 p.m. CEST
- Game attendance: 12,878
- Referee: John Hessey

=== Week 10: vs Berlin Thunder ===
Week Ten: Berlin Thunder at Amsterdam Admirals

Quarter	1	2	3	4	Total
Berlin	3	10	7	0	20
Amsterdam	0	7	0	14	21

at Olympic Stadium, Amsterdam, Netherlands

- Date: Friday, June 15
- Game time: 8:07 p.m. CEST
- Game attendance: 11,893
- Referee: Tom Symonette
