= Lynn McGruder =

American football player (born 1982)

No. 73
- Position: Defensive tackle

Personal information
- Born: February 13, 1982 (age 44); Palestine, Texas
- Listed height: 6 ft 1 in (1.85 m)
- Listed weight: 265 lb (120 kg)

Career information
- High school: Las Vegas (NV) Cheyenne
- College: Oklahoma
- NFL draft: 2005: undrafted

Career history
- Tampa Bay Buccaneers* (2005); Indianapolis Colts* (2005); Cincinnati Bengals* (2005); Washington Redskins* (2005); Tampa Bay Buccaneers* (2006); Detroit Lions* (2006); Seattle Seahawks* (2006); Amsterdam Admirals (2007)
- * Offseason or practice squad member only

Lynn McGruder (born February 13, 1982) is an American former football defensive tackle. He played college football for the Oklahoma Sooners where he earned a Communications major.

== Early life ==
McGruder was regarded as one of the nation's top defensive linemen during his time at Cheyenne High School. He was the second-rated defensive line prospect in the West region by Prep Star, the sixth-best defensive lineman in the country by the National Recruiting Advisor and named to Prep Star's Dream Team. McGruder was listed in SuperPrep's top 25 defensive line prospects and named Gatorade Nevada Player of the Year as a senior. The first-team all-state choice totaled 65 tackles and 12 sacks during his senior season.

== College career ==
McGruder originally chose the University of Tennessee over local Nevada-Las Vegas. He appeared in nine games as a reserve defensive tackle for the Volunteers in 2000. McGruder was credited with six tackles, a 2-yard sack and three quarterback pressures. McGruder had his scholarship revoked after he was charged with marijuana possession with the intent to distribute. The charge was later dismissed, but McGruder was forced to transfer to a new school.

He accepted an offer to attend the University of Oklahoma, sitting out during the 2001 season as a transfer student. In 2002, McGruder appeared in 10 games behind All-American Tommie Harris for the Sooners, collecting 20 tackles (13 solo) with a sack, four stops for losses and four pressures. He again played behind Harris in 2003, delivering 25 tackles (13 solo) with two sacks, four stops behind the line of scrimmage and four pressures.

With Harris having gone to the NFL, McGruder stepped into the starting lineup at weak-side defensive tackle in 2004, starting 11 of 13 games. He recorded 24 tackles (10 solo) with a pair of sacks, and six stops for losses and pressure. For his Sooner career, he totaled 69 tackles (36 solo), four sacks for -11 yards, 14 stops for losses of 31 yards, nine pressures and three pass deflections in 37 games. For his collegiate career, he appeared in 46 contests, making 75 tackles (38 solo), five sacks, 15 stops behind the line of scrimmage and 12 pressures.

== Personal life ==
McGruder and Oklahoma wide receiver Mark Clayton assisted victims of a serious automobile mishap on a highway near the Oklahoma campus in the 2003 offseason. McGruder helped save a family of five when he pulled four of the victims through a door, then doused the fire with an extinguisher. He received the Big 12 Sportsman of the Year Award in 2003 and was nominated for the Football Writers Association's Most Courageous Award.
