= Tony Carter (cornerback) =

American football player and coach (born 1986)

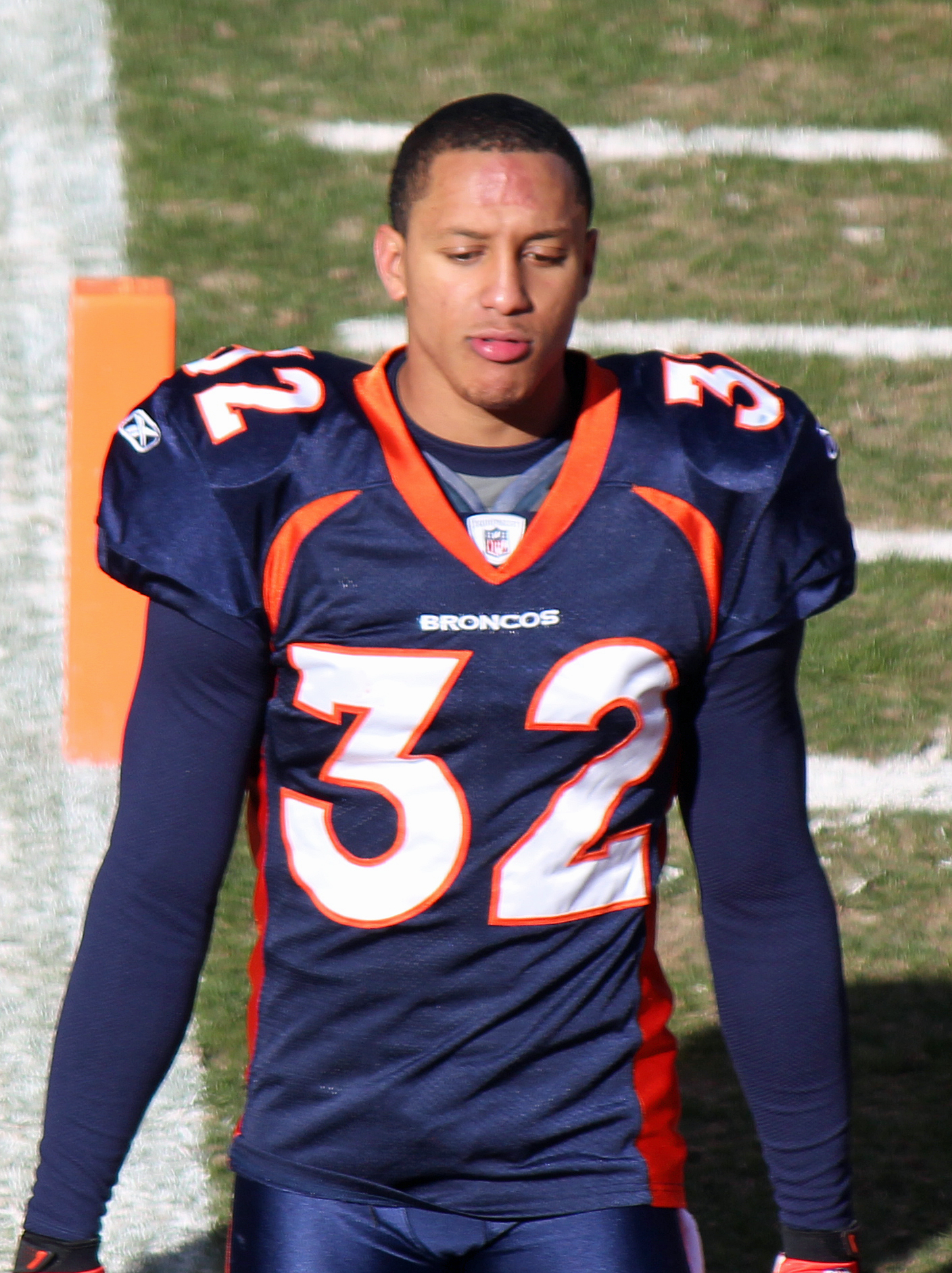
- Carter with the Denver Broncos in 2011

Central State Marauders
- Title: Head coach

Personal information
- Born: May 24, 1986 (age 40); Jacksonville, Florida, U.S.
- Listed height: 5 ft 9 in (1.75 m)
- Listed weight: 177 lb (80 kg)

Career information
- High school: Jacksonville (FL) Mandarin
- College: Florida State
- NFL draft: 2009: undrafted

Career history

Playing
- Denver Broncos (2009–2010); New England Patriots (2010); Minnesota Vikings (2011)*; Denver Broncos (2011–2014); Indianapolis Colts (2015); New Orleans Saints (2015–2016)
- * Offseason or practice squad member only

Coaching
- Oakland Raiders (2018) Bill Walsh diversity coaching fellowship; Jacksonville (2019) Cornerbacks coach; Detroit Lions (2020) Defensive assistant; Southern Illinois (2021) Cornerbacks coach; Orlando Guardians (2023) Defensive coordinator; Southeastern (2024) Cornerbacks coach; Central State (OH) (2025–present) Head coach

Awards and highlights
- 2× First-team All-ACC (2007, 2008); 2× Second-team All-ACC (2005, 2006)

Career NFL statistics
- Total tackles: 49
- Fumble recoveries: 3
- Interceptions: 3
- Defensive touchdowns: 3
- Stats at Pro Football Reference

Head coaching record
- Career: 3–7 (.300)

Tony Lamar Carter Jr. (born May 24, 1986) is an American football coach and former cornerback. He is the head football coach for Central State University, a position he has held since 2025. He also coached for Jacksonville, Southern Illinois, Southeastern, the Oakland Raiders and Detroit Lions of the National Football League (NFL), and the Orlando Guardians of the XFL. He played college football for Florida State and professionally for the Denver Broncos, New England Patriots, Minnesota Vikings, Indianapolis Colts, and New Orleans Saints of the NFL.

== Early life ==
Carter attended Mandarin High School in Jacksonville, Florida, where he played football as a cornerback, quarterback, and wide receiver along with Running Back Johnny Hunt. As a senior, he had four interceptions, two blocked kicks, and five touchdowns and earned third-team all-state honors. He was rated the second best cornerback in the nation by Rivals.com. Carter was a member of the East Squad in the 2004 U.S. Army All-American Bowl. He also participated in track and field, reaching the state finals in the 110-meter hurdles as a junior.

== College career ==
Following high school, Carter chose to attend Florida State University over Tennessee and North Carolina. After redshirting in 2004, Carter started all 13 games at cornerback as a freshman in 2005. His 12 pass break-ups ranked first on the team, and added 41 tackles, including four for a loss, as well as one interception. He earned first-team Freshman All-American honors as well as being named to the All-Atlantic Coast Conference second team.

After missing the first two games of his 2006 sophomore season with a knee injury, Carter went on to start the final 11 games of the season. He ranked second on the team with two interceptions, both of which Carter returned for touchdowns. Carter also added a blocked field goal return for a touchdown and a blocked PAT return for two points. His 20 points scored ranked seventh on the team. He finished the season with 27 tackles and was named the Most Valuable Defensive Player of the team's Emerald Bowl victory.

As a junior in 2007, Carter started all 13 games at cornerback, finishing with 45 tackles on the season, his career high. He also set a career mark with four interceptions, while tying the team lead with six pass break-ups and was First-Team All ACC. In 2008, as a senior, Carter again started all 13 games, ending his Florida State career with a 33-game starting streak. He finished the season with 25 tackles and two interceptions and earned first-team All-ACC honors.

== Professional career ==
=== Denver Broncos (first stint) ===
After going undrafted in the 2009 NFL draft, Carter signed with the Denver Broncos on April 27, 2009. He was waived during final cuts on September 5, 2009, and re-signed to the team's practice squad the next day. He was promoted to the Broncos' active roster on December 19, 2009, and made his NFL debut in Week 15 against the Oakland Raiders. In Week 16 against the Philadelphia Eagles, Carter made his first career start. He finished the 2009 season with three tackles and one pass defensed. He spent the first three games of the 2010 preseason with the Broncos before being waived/injured on August 30, 2010, with a hamstring injury. He cleared waivers the next day, August 31, and was released with an injury settlement; he otherwise would have reverted to injured reserve.

=== New England Patriots ===
The New England Patriots signed Carter to their practice squad on September 7, 2010. He was promoted to the 53-man roster on December 18, 2010, prior the Patriots' Week 15 game against the Green Bay Packers. He was active for two of the final three games of the season, recording one tackle. On July 26, Carter was informed he would be released on July 28.

=== Minnesota Vikings ===
On August 11, 2011, Carter signed with the Minnesota Vikings.

=== Denver Broncos (second stint) ===
On November 29, 2011, Carter once again signed with the Denver Broncos.

==== 2012 season ====
On October 15, 2012, against the San Diego Chargers on Monday Night Football, he recovered a fumble and returned it 65 yards to score his first career touchdown, before intercepting Philip Rivers in the fourth quarter. Each play was instrumental in Denver's comeback from a 24–0 halftime deficit to win 35–24. On November 10, Carter had an interception return for a touchdown off a Cam Newton pass in a win over the Carolina Panthers. On January 12, 2013, in the Divisional Round against the eventual Super Bowl champion Baltimore Ravens, Carter was brutally burned on a 70-yard touchdown to Jacoby Jones which tied the game at 35, as Denver would go on to lose 38–35 in double overtime, dashing the Broncos' Super Bowl hopes.

==== 2013 season ====
On September 15, 2013, against the New York Giants on the first play of the fourth quarter, Carter deflected a pass with his foot, which made the ball go right into the hands of teammate Chris Harris Jr. On November 24, against his former team the New England Patriots, Carter made a mistake that cost Denver the game. New England was punting in overtime with a 31–31 score. Punt returner Wes Welker, also a former Patriot, made a "get out of the way" signal. The call was late and did not give Carter time to move away, the football hit Carter's thigh which made it a free football and Nate Ebner recovered it in Broncos territory, which set up the game-winning 31-yard field goal by Stephen Gostkowski.

=== Indianapolis Colts ===
On October 20, 2015, Carter signed with the Indianapolis Colts. He appeared in 3 games before being waived on November 9.

=== New Orleans Saints ===
On December 16, 2015, Carter was signed by the New Orleans Saints. On December 26, 2015, he was waived. On February 8, 2016, he was signed by the Saints. On July 29, 2016, he was waived.

== Coaching career ==
Carter was hired by the Detroit Lions as a defensive assistant in 2020. He was the interim defensive backs coach for the team's week 16 game in 2020 against the Tampa Bay Buccaneers due to Steve Gregory missing the game under COVID-19 protocols.

Carter was hired to be the defensive coordinator of the Orlando Guardians in June 2022, under his former coach at Florida State, Terrell Buckley. On January 1, 2024, it was announced the Guardians would not be a part of the UFL Merger.

After one season as the cornerbacks coach for Southeastern University, Carter was hired as the head football coach for Central State University.

== Head coaching record ==
Year	Team	Overall	Conference	Standing	Bowl/playoffs
Central State Marauders (Southern Intercollegiate Athletic Conference) (2025–present)
2025	Central State	3–7	3–5	T–7th	
2026	Central State	0–0	0–0		
Central State:		3–7	3–5		
Total:		3–7			
