= Wakulla High School =

Public high school in Florida, US

Coordinates: 30.1065926°N 84.3762882°W

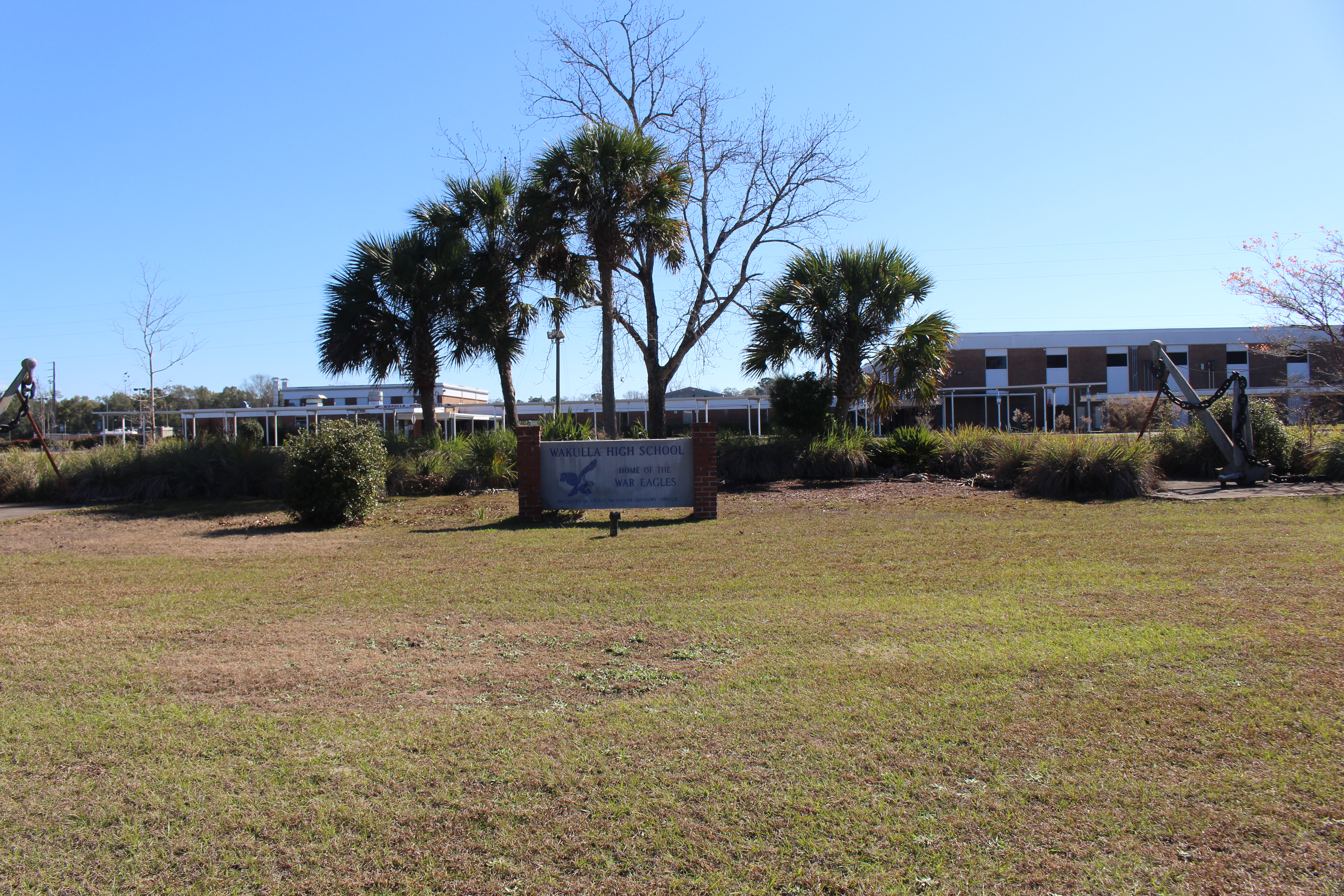
- 3237 Coastal Highway; Crawfordville, Florida; US

Information
- Type: Public High School
- Motto: Home of the War Eagles
- Established: 1967
- School district: Wakulla County Public Schools
- Principal: Michele Falk
- Teaching staff: 77.00 (on an FTE basis)
- Grades: 9–12
- Enrollment: 1,386 (2023–2024)
- Student to teacher ratio: 18.00
- Colors: Red, white and blue
- Nickname: War Eagles
- Accreditation: AdvancED
- Yearbook: Eagle's Crest
- Website: https://whs.wakullaschooldistrict.org/

Wakulla High School is the only public four year high school located in Wakulla County, Florida, United States. It is part of the Wakulla County Public Schools network. The Florida Department of Education has labeled Wakulla High School as a "School of Excellence" in their school accountability reports for the years 2020 and 2021.

== History ==
Wakulla High School opened in 1967. It combined (via desegregation) three former schools: Sopchoppy, Shadeville, and Crawfordville High Schools. The first year had 564 students and taught grades 7-12. Prior to the use of the War Eagle mascot, the school were the "rebels".

== Career & Technical Education ==
Wakulla High School has many vocational training programs incorporated into the normal school day. Many of these programs lead to industry certification. Currently, WHS offers programs in the areas of diesel mechanics, drones, auto mechanics, digital design, web development, carpentry, culinary arts, television production, welding, the nursing assisting program which is the major focus of the Wakulla High School's Medical Academy and the Engineering Academy. These programs articulate into college or technical education programs at the post-secondary level, if the student chooses to pursue this field.

== Electives ==
- Art
- AVID
- Band
- Foreign Languages (Spanish)
- NJROTC
- Theatre (tech & acting)
- Welding
- Medical academy
- Cosmotology academy
- Carpentry academy
- Peer Partners Learning (WING)
- Drones
- Diesel Mechanics

== Sports ==
As of 2024, Wakulla High offers 24 sports programs, many of which have both JV and varsity teams.The winter guard team competes in a circuit and bring home many awards. The softball team is one of the best in the state. The band is one of the best in the district achieving superior at all competitions. The band has 120 members currently as of 2024. The football team shows strong dedication and win many games.

- Color Guard (all gender)
- Winter Guard (all gender)
- Baseball
- Basketball (boys and girls)
- Cheerleading (all gender)
- Cross Country (boys and girls)
- Flag Football (girls)
- Football
- Golf (boys and girls)
- Soccer (boys and girls)
- Softball
- Tennis (boys and girls)
- Track & Field (boys and girls)
- Volleyball
- Weightlifting (boys and girls)
- Wrestling (boys and girls)
- Marching Band (all gender)

== Demographics ==
=== Students ===
Enrollment Demographics (2019–20)

- Total: 1,459
- White: 1,175
- Black: 147
- Hispanic: 52
- Asian: 8
- Native Hawaiian/Pacific Islander: 1
- American Indian/Alaska Native: 3
- Two or more races: 73

Enrollment by grade (2019–20)

- Freshman: 396
- Sophomore: 370
- Junior: 368
- Senior: 325

Enrollment by Gender (2019–20)

- Male: 737
- Female: 722

=== Teachers ===
- Classroom Teachers: 80 (2019–20)

== Notable alumni ==
- Nigel Bradham, former linebacker for the Florida State Seminoles and Former linebacker for the Philadelphia Eagles (Class of 2008)
- Alvin Hall, author, radio and television host, financial expert
- Sam McGrew, former linebacker for the Florida State Seminoles and Miami Dolphins (Class of 2002)
- Feleipe Franks, tight end for the Carolina Panthers (Class of 2016)
- Jordan Franks, tight end for the Cleveland Browns
- Brad Lord, pitcher for the Washington Nationals (Class of 2018)
- Nehemiah Chandler, college football cornerback for the Florida State Seminoles (Class of 2024)
