= Pascal Matla =

Dutch gridiron football player (born 1981)

Profile
- Position: Center

Personal information
- Born: February 4, 1981 (age 45); Leidschendam, Netherlands
- Listed height: 6 ft 5 in (1.96 m)
- Listed weight: 310 lb (141 kg)

Career information
- College: Eastern Illinois

Career history
- Amsterdam Admirals (2007)

Pascal Matla (born February 4, 1981) is a former American football player.

== Career ==
Matla grew up in Voorburg, Netherlands. As a youth, he attended a media day for the Amsterdam Admirals and had the opportunity to meet some of the players. Matla later recalled, "One of the players told me I was a big kid and told me I should play. So I went home and started looking for information on where to play." At age 17, he joined a club in Zoetermeer that was part of a flag football league. At age 18, he joined the full-contact division, and at age 19, he played football in Saarland, Germany. He traveled to Tampa, Florida to play with 36 European players in an exhibition game before the Super Bowl. While in Tampa, he learned of college football, and a tape of the Europeans' game was seen by the offensive line coach for Eastern Illinois University. He was offered a scholarship and enrolled at the school. Matla joined the Eastern Illinois football team in the summer of 2001 for workouts and drills and played for the team from 2002 to 2005 and was selected as a second-team All-Ohio Valley Conference player in 2004. Matla attended training camp with the New Orleans Saints in the summer of 2006, but was released before the regular season began. He played for the Amsterdam Admirals of the NFL Europa in 2007.
