= Sam McGrew =

American football player (born 1984)

Profile
- Position: Linebacker

Personal information
- Born: July 28, 1984 (age 42); Crawfordville, Florida, U.S.
- Listed height: 6 ft 2 in (1.88 m)
- Listed weight: 244 lb (111 kg)

Career information
- High school: Wakulla (Crawfordville)
- College: Florida State
- NFL draft: 2006: undrafted

Career history
- Miami Dolphins (2006); Amsterdam Admirals (2007)

Sam McGrew (born July 28, 1984) is an American former football linebacker with the Miami Dolphins. He played four years of college football at Florida State University, and four years of high school football at Wakulla High School. His cousin Reggie McGrew played defensive tackle at Florida and in the NFL.

== Early life ==
A native of Crawfordville, Florida, McGrew attended Wakulla High School, where he was an All-State linebacker. In his senior year, he recorded over 150 tackles and was considered by many publications to be the best inside linebacker prospect in Florida. Regarded as a four-star recruit by Rivals.com, McGrew was ranked the No. 15 inside linebacker in his class, behind (among others) eventual FSU teammates A. J. Nicholson and Buster Davis. After official visits to Kentucky, Florida, Alabama, and Florida State, he committed to the Seminoles.

== College career ==
In his true freshman season at Florida State, McGrew played in all 14 games, mostly on special teams but also as back-up to Allen Augustin at middle linebacker. He recorded eight tackles on the season, including a season-high three stops in the 21–13 win at Georgia Tech. As a sophomore, McGrew still served as back-up to Augustin, finishing the season with 19 total tackles (13 solo), two tackles for loss, a quarterback sack and a forced fumble. He had a season-high tackle performance with four each vs. Maryland and Clemson.

After Augustin's graduation, McGrew and Buster Davis battled to replace him as starting middle linebacker. McGrew played in all 12 games, and was seventh on the team in tackles with 44 on the season. He had eight tackles against North Carolina. Still a back-up to Davis in his senior year, McGrew finished the year with 54 tackles, which ranked first among players not in the regular starting lineup. In his final college career game, the Orange Bowl vs. Penn State, McGrew recorded a career-high 11 tackles (1.5 for loss).

== Professional career ==
Considered a “two-down defender who struggles in coverage” by Sports Illustrated, McGrew was not selected in the 2006 NFL draft. He was, however, signed as an undrafted free agent by the Miami Dolphins. He never played an NFL game, and was sent to the Amsterdam Admirals.
