= Nehemiah Chandler =

American football player (born 2005)

No. 12 – Florida State Seminoles
- Position: Cornerback
- Class: Redshirt Sophomore

Personal information
- Born: November 25, 2005 (age 20)
- Listed height: 6 ft 1 in (1.85 m)
- Listed weight: 180 lb (82 kg)

Career information
- High school: Wakulla (Crawfordville, Florida)
- College: Georgia Tech (2024); South Alabama (2025); Florida State (2026–present)

Awards and highlights
- First-team All-Sun Belt (2025)
- Stats at ESPN

Nehemiah Chandler (born November 25, 2005) is an American football cornerback for the Florida State Seminoles. He previously played for the Georgia Tech Yellow Jackets and for the South Alabama Jaguars.

== Early life ==
Chandler attended Wakulla High School in Crawfordville, Florida, and committed to play college football for the Georgia Tech Yellow Jackets.

== College career ==
As a freshman at Georgia Tech in 2024, Chandler took a redshirt and played in just one game. After the season, he entered the NCAA transfer portal.

Chandler transferred to play for the South Alabama Jaguars. Heading into the 2025 season, he earned a starting spot in the Jaguars secondary. That season, Chandler appeared in 11 games, totaling 32 tackles with two and a half being for a loss, 13 pass deflections, and two interceptions, earning first-team all-Sun Belt honors. After the conclusion of the 2025 season, Chandler once again entered the NCAA transfer portal.

Chandler transferred to play for the Florida State Seminoles.
