= Xavier Chaplin =

American football player

No. 77 – Florida State Seminoles
- Position: Offensive tackle
- Class: Redshirt Senior

Personal information
- Listed height: 6 ft 8 in (2.03 m)
- Listed weight: 346 lb (157 kg)

Career information
- High school: Whale Branch Early College (Seabrook, South Carolina)
- College: Virginia Tech (2022–2024); Auburn (2025); Florida State (2026–present)
- Stats at ESPN

Xavier Chaplin is an American college football offensive tackle for the Florida State Seminoles. He previously played for the Virginia Tech Hokies and Auburn Tigers.

== Early life ==
Chaplin attended Whale Branch Early College High School in Seabrook, South Carolina, where he played as both an offensive lineman and defensive lineman. Coming out of high school, he was rated as a three-star recruit and the eighth overall player in South Carolina, and committed to play college football for the Virginia Tech Hokies.

== College career ==
=== Virginia Tech ===
As a freshman in 2022, Chaplin took a redshirt. In 2023, he started all 13 games and was named a third-team all-American by College Football Network. In week 8 of the 2024 season, Chaplin was named PFF's left tackle of the week, as he helped the Hokies to a win over Boston College. In week ten, Chaplin left the game early in a win versus Georgia Tech. During the 2024 season, he started all 12 games at left tackle. After the season, Chaplin entered his name into the NCAA transfer portal.

=== Auburn ===
Chaplin transferred to play for the Auburn Tigers.

On December 26, 2025, Chaplin announced that he would enter the transfer portal for the second time.

=== Florida State ===
On January 9, 2026, Chaplin announced that he would transfer to Florida State.
