= Mandrell Desir =

American football player

No. 3 – Florida State Seminoles
- Position: Defensive tackle
- Class: Sophomore

Personal information
- Listed height: 6 ft 4 in (1.93 m)
- Listed weight: 265 lb (120 kg)

Career information
- High school: Norland (Miami Gardens, Florida)
- College: Florida State (2025–present)
- Stats at ESPN

Mandrell Desir is an American college football defensive tackle for the Florida State Seminoles.

== Early life ==
Desir attended Miami Norland Senior High School in Miami Gardens, Florida with his twin brother Darryll. As a senior he had 66 tackles and 12 sacks. Over his final three seasons, he totaled 148 tackles and 18 sacks. Desir and his brother originally committed to play college football at the University of Central Florida (UCF) before flipping their commitment to Florida State University.

== College career ==
Desir earned playing time in his true freshman year at Florida State in 2025.
