= Lorenzo Booker =

American football player (born 1984)

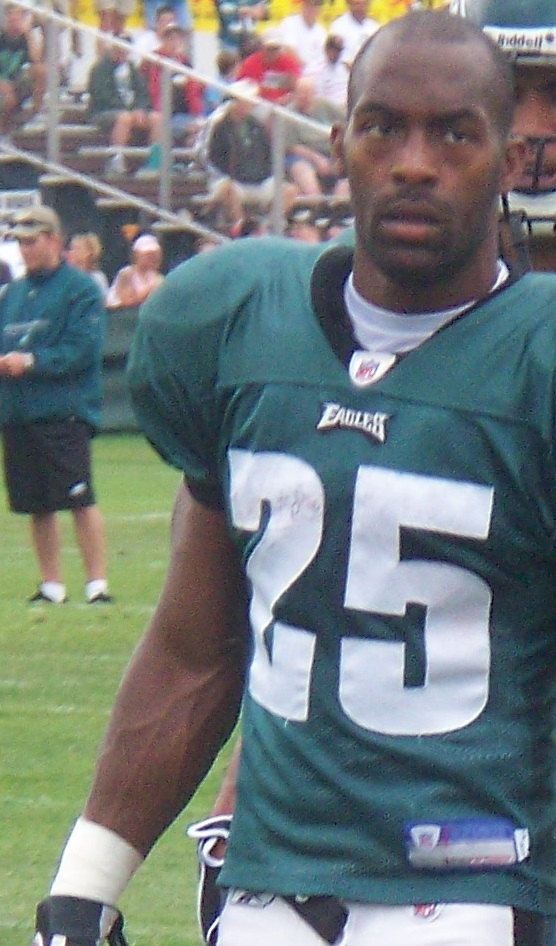
- Booker at Philadelphia Eagles training camp in 2009

No. 20, 25, 27, 38, 28
- Position: Running back

Personal information
- Born: June 14, 1984 (age 42); Oxnard, California, U.S.
- Listed height: 5 ft 10 in (1.78 m)
- Listed weight: 201 lb (91 kg)

Career information
- High school: St. Bonaventure (Ventura, California)
- College: Florida State
- NFL draft: 2007: 3rd round, 71st overall pick

Career history
- Miami Dolphins (2007); Philadelphia Eagles (2008); Hartford Colonials (2010); Minnesota Vikings (2010−2011); Chicago Bears (2012)

Career NFL statistics
- Rushing attempts: 61
- Rushing yards: 230
- Receptions: 47
- Receiving yards: 362
- Stats at Pro Football Reference

Lorenzo Adarryll Booker (born June 14, 1984) is an American former professional football player who was a running back in the National Football League (NFL). He was selected by the Miami Dolphins in the third round of the 2007 NFL draft. He played college football for the Florida State Seminoles.

Booker was also a member of the Philadelphia Eagles, Hartford Colonials, Minnesota Vikings, and Chicago Bears.

== Early life ==
Booker was born in Oxnard, California. He attended St. Bonaventure High School in Ventura, California, where he was a letterman in football and track. In football, he played as a running back. As a senior, Booker ran for 2878 yards and 50 touchdowns, and also had 16 receptions for 300 yards along with three more touchdowns. He was widely regarded as the nation's top running back prospect and was named a Parade All-American and to the PrepStar Dream Team. He also earned USA Today All-USA first-team honors and was ranked by Rivals.com as the number 3 overall prospect in the country and a five star recruit. In his junior year, Booker had an equally-impressive 3103 yards and 49 touchdowns, and for his three-year career had 8502 rushing yards and 137 touchdowns, both state records. During this time, he led his team a 42–0 record.

In track & field, Booker competed as a sprinter and jumper. In sprints, he achieved PR of 10.8 seconds in the 100-meter dash and 22.2 seconds in the 200-meter dash. In the jumping events, he cleared more than 22 feet (6.80m) in the long jump.

After an initial verbal commitment to Notre Dame, Booker chose Florida State over Notre Dame and USC in a nationally televised press conference on ESPN. Following his high school career, Booker played in the 2002 U.S. Army All-American Bowl alongside fellow Florida State Seminoles Kamerion Wimbley and Buster Davis. Following his senior season, he was awarded the Gatorade High School Heisman, honoring the top high school athlete in the nation.

== College career ==
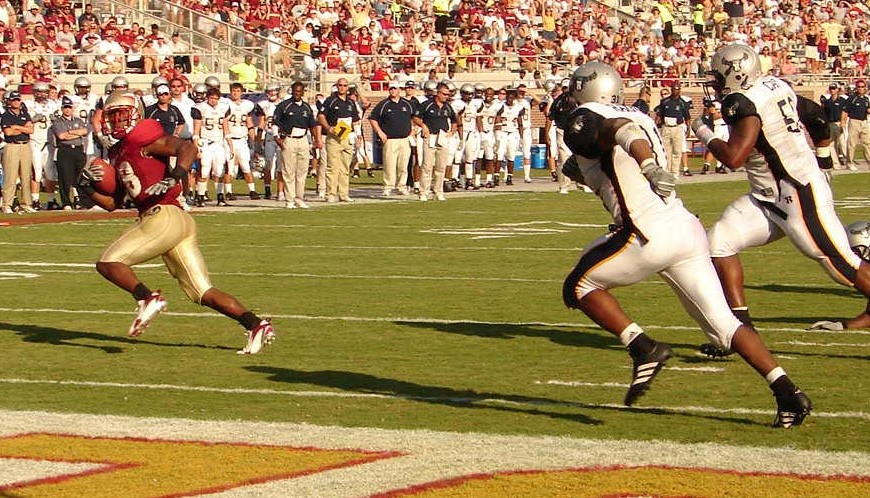
Booker (#28) about to score a touchdown in 2006 as a Florida State Seminole against Rice.

Booker redshirted his first year at Florida State. In his freshman year with the Seminoles in 2003, Booker was fourth on the team in carries with 62, third in rushing yards with 334, and third in rushing touchdowns with three, and also recorded 19 receptions for 86 yards. In his sophomore year in 2004, Booker led the team in carries with 173, and was second in both rushing yards (887) and touchdowns (four), and also had 24 catches for 160 yards. Booker led the Seminoles in rushing yards, carries, and touchdowns in his junior year in 2005, with 119 carries for 552 yards (4.8 average) and four touchdowns. He also recorded 38 receptions for 329 yards and two touchdowns. While in college, Booker earned the nickname L-Boogie.

== Professional career ==
Pre-draft measurables
Height	Weight	Arm length	Hand span	40-yard dash	10-yard split	20-yard split	20-yard shuttle	Vertical jump	Broad jump	Bench press	Wonderlic
5 ft 10 3/8 in (1.79 m)	193 lb (88 kg)	30 1/2 in (0.77 m)	9 in (0.23 m)	4.46 s	1.46 s	2.58 s	3.98 s	35 1/2 in (0.90 m)	10 ft 1 in (3.07 m)	26 reps	17
Measurables were taken at the NFL Scouting Combine, except for those taken at Pro Day: arm and hand spans, 20-yard shuttle, and Wonderlic.

=== Miami Dolphins ===
Booker was selected in the third round (71st overall) of the 2007 NFL draft by the Miami Dolphins. He signed a four-year contract with the Dolphins on May 24, 2007.

Booker had his first significant action in the loss to the Jets on December 12, 2007, when he was used primarily as a receiver. He had one carry for six yards and six catches for 63 yards.

=== Philadelphia Eagles ===
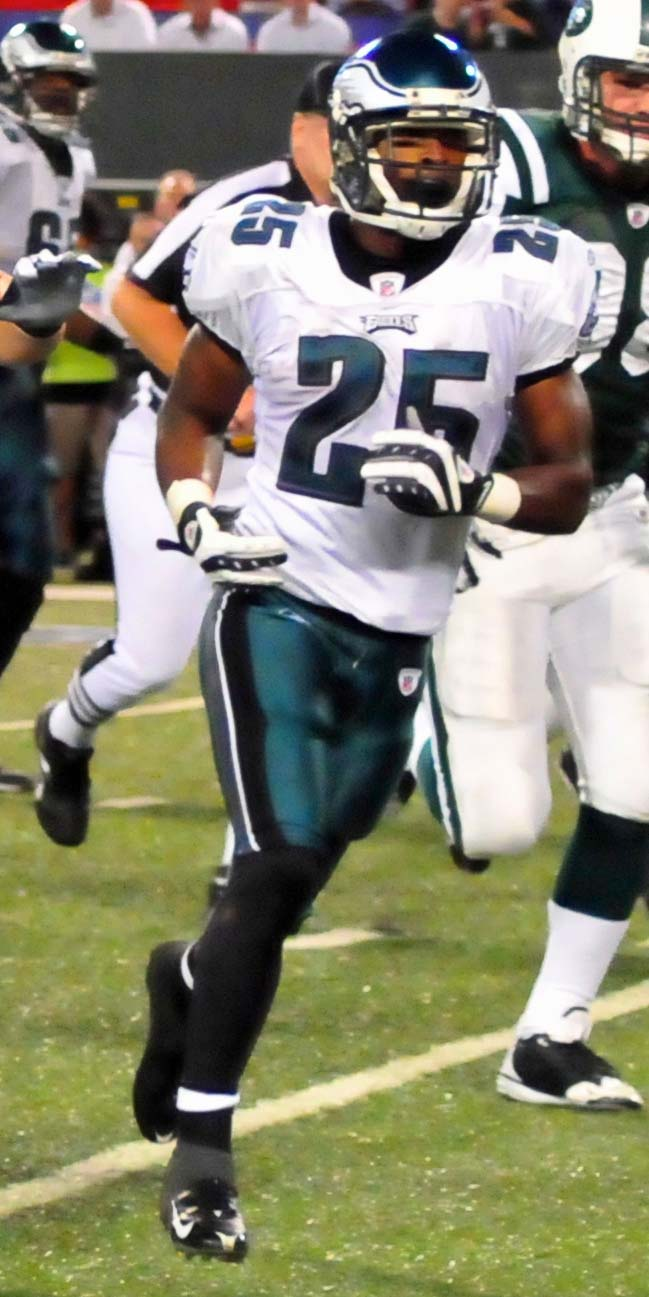
Booker with the Eagles in 2009

Booker was traded to the Philadelphia Eagles on April 26, 2008, for a fourth round pick in the 2008 NFL draft. He rushed for 53 yards on 20 carries and caught six passes for 11 yards in 2008. He was waived on September 5, 2009, during final cuts.

=== Hartford Colonials ===
Booker signed with the Hartford Colonials of the United Football League on August 17, 2010. He was named the UFL Offensive Player of the Week for week 7 during the 2010 season after rushing for 147 yards and a touchdown.

Booker boycotted the Colonials' November 20, 27–14 win over the Las Vegas Locomotives to protest the league's $150,000 transfer fee. The fee was payable to a UFL team if one of its players is signed by an NFL team. Booker and other players believed they were led to believe the fee would be waived once the season is over, not until February 1, 2011, since the previous season the fee was waived and 43 UFL players eventually were signed by NFL teams. On November 22, Booker was suspended by the UFL for the boycott.

=== Minnesota Vikings ===
On December 6, 2010, Booker was signed by the Minnesota Vikings after the UFL transfer fee was reduced to $25,000.

In his four games with the Vikings, Booker was used primarily as a kick returner. On 18 returns, he amassed 429 yards for an average of 23.8 yards a return. He also had 5 catches for 32 yards.

=== Chicago Bears ===
Booker signed with the Chicago Bears on July 17, 2012. In the second game of the preseason against the Washington Redskins, Booker returned the second-half opening kickoff 105 yards for a touchdown. The return would've been the longest kick return in Bears history had it occurred in the regular season. Booker competed with Armando Allen for the third running back spot. Booker later won the spot, leading to Allen's release on August 31.

Booker was put on Injured Reserve on September 8, 2012. He was released from the Injured Reserve on September 18, 2012.
