= Deandre' Eiland =

American football player (born 1982)

No. 42
- Position: Safety

Personal information
- Born: June 4, 1982 (age 44); Tupelo, Mississippi, U.S.
- Listed height: 6 ft 0 in (1.83 m)
- Listed weight: 207 lb (94 kg)

Career information
- High school: Tupelo (MS)
- College: South Carolina
- NFL draft: 2004: 6th round, 184th overall pick

Career history
- Minnesota Vikings (2004)*; Indianapolis Colts (2004)*; Miami Dolphins (2004–2005); San Francisco 49ers (2005)*; St. Louis Rams (2006)*; Amsterdam Admirals (2007)
- * Offseason or practice squad member only

Deandre' Eiland (born June 4, 1982) is an American former professional football player. He played college football for the South Carolina Gamecocks and was selected in the sixth round of the 2004 NFL draft by the Minnesota Vikings with the 184th overall pick.
