= Buster Davis (linebacker) =

American football player (born 1983)

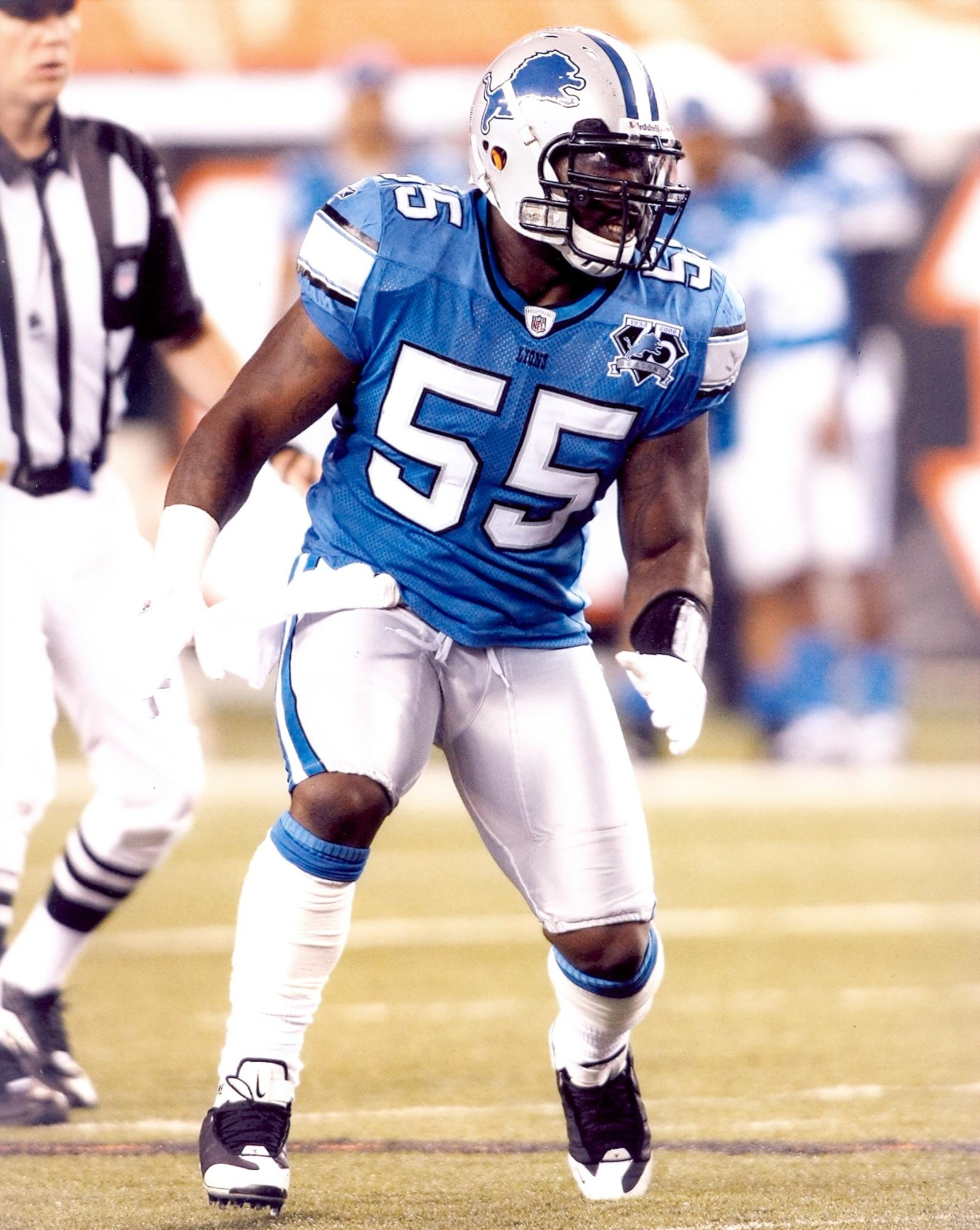
- Davis with the Detroit Lions in 2008

No. 55, 52
- Position: Linebacker

Personal information
- Born: October 20, 1983 (age 43); Daytona Beach, Florida, U.S.
- Listed height: 5 ft 9 in (1.75 m)
- Listed weight: 251 lb (114 kg)

Career information
- High school: Mainland (Daytona Beach)
- College: Florida State (2002–2006)
- NFL draft: 2007: 3rd round, 69th overall pick

Career history
- Arizona Cardinals (2007)*; Detroit Lions (2007); Indianapolis Colts (2008); Houston Texans (2009)*; Hartford Colonials (2010); Las Vegas Locomotives (2010); Jacksonville Sharks (2011–2012)
- * Offseason or practice squad member only

Awards and highlights
- First-team All-American (2006); First-team All-ACC (2006)

Career NFL statistics
- Total tackles: 24
- Stats at Pro Football Reference

James "Buster" Davis (born October 20, 1983) is an American former professional football player who was a linebacker in the National Football League (NFL). He was selected by the Arizona Cardinals in the third round of the 2007 NFL draft. He played college football for the Florida State Seminoles. Davis was also a member of the Detroit Lions, Indianapolis Colts, Houston Texans, Hartford Colonials, Las Vegas Locomotives, and Jacksonville Sharks.

== Early life ==
Buster Davis played for Mainland High School in Daytona Beach. Davis played in the 2002 U.S. Army All-American Bowl alongside fellow Florida State Seminoles Kamerion Wimbley and Lorenzo Booker.

== Professional career ==
=== Arizona Cardinals ===
Davis was selected 69th overall by the Arizona Cardinals in the third round in the 2007 NFL draft out of Florida State University. Davis signed a three-year, $1.7 million contract with a $610,000 signing bonus with the Cardinals, but was later released on September 1, 2007.

=== Detroit Lions ===
On September 4, 2007, he joined the practice squad of the Detroit Lions. He was promoted to the active roster on December 19. Davis was waived by the Lions during final cuts on August 30, 2008.

=== Indianapolis Colts ===
A day after being let go by the Lions, Davis was claimed off waivers by the Indianapolis Colts on August 31, 2008. An exclusive-rights free agent in the 2009 offseason, Davis was re-signed by the Colts on March 17. However, he was waived by the team two weeks later on March 31.

=== Houston Texans ===
Davis signed a one-year deal with the Houston Texans on April 3, 2009. He was waived on September 5. He was re-signed to the practice squad and released on September 15. On October 8 he was re-signed to the practice squad, he was released on October 13.
