= 2005 Rhein Fire season =

NFL Europe team season

- General manager: Sammy Schmale
- Head coach: Pete Kuharchek
- Home stadium: LTU arena

Results
- Record: 3–7
- Division place: 6th
- Playoffs: did not qualify

The 2005 Rhein Fire season was the 11th season for the franchise in the NFL Europe League (NFLEL). The team was led by head coach Pete Kuharchek in his fifth year, and played its home games at the newly built LTU arena in Düsseldorf, Germany. They finished the regular season in sixth place with a record of three wins and seven losses.

== Offseason ==
=== Free agent draft ===
2005 Rhein Fire NFLEL free agent draft selections
Draft order		Player name	Position	College
Round	Overall	Player name	Position	College
1	2	Jason Rader	TE	Marshall
2	8	Jesse Mitchell	DT	Mississippi
3	17	Sean Guthrie	DE	Boston College
4	20	Brandon Rager	LB	San Diego State
5	29	Jeremy Phillips	T	Lenoir–Rhyne
6	32	Clarence LeBlanc	S	Louisiana State
7	41	Travis Carroll	LB	Florida

== Personnel ==
=== Staff ===
2005 Rhein Fire staff
Front office: General Manager – Sammy Schmale; Head coaches: Head Coach – Pete Kuharchek; Offensive coaches: Offensive Coordinator/Quarterbacks – Scott Milanovich; Running Backs – Kevin O’Neal; Wide Receivers – Alvin Harper; Offensive Line – Jan Quarless	Defensive coaches: Defensive Coordinator/Defensive Backs/Special Teams – Adrian White; Defensive Line – Ken Clarke; Linebackers – E. J. Junior; National Coach/Defensive Backs – Sascha Gehloff; Strength and conditioning: Strength and Conditioning – Juney Barnett

=== Roster ===
2005 Rhein Fire final roster
Quarterbacks: 12 Jason Fife; 9 Andy Hall; 7 Scott McBrien; Running backs: 30 Dahrran Diedrick; 46 Joe Hall; 28 Adam Matthews; 21 Brandon Miree; 37 Joe Smith; Wide receivers: 82 Nathan Black; 83 Cedric James; 87 Glenn Martinez; 81 Jeris McIntyre; Tight ends: 85 T. J. Cottrell; 45 Marcus Helfman; 45 Jason Rader	Offensive linemen: 68 Bryan Anderson G; 79 Brendan Darby T; 76 Shawn Draper G/T; 77 Matt Hill T; 72 Matt Miller G; 64 Steve Morley G/T; 75 Morgan Pears T; 70 A. J. Ricker C; Defensive linemen: 91 Eddie Freeman DT; 99 Sean Guthrie DE; 95 Justin Montgomery DT; 93 Greg Scott DT; 97 Doug Sims DT; 90 Derrick Strong DE; 92 Demetrios Walker DE	Linebackers: 54 Josh Buhl MLB; 50 Tony Gilbert MLB; 52 Terrence Robinson OLB; 57 Cabel Rohloff OLB; 59 Edward Thomas OLB; Defensive backs: 42 Blue Adams CB; 26 Jonathan Cox CB; 41 Clarence Curry CB; 29 Chris Day CB; 35 Clarence LeBlanc FS; 25 Chazz Moore SS/FS; 43 Keyon Nash FS; Special teams: 15 Travis Dorsch P; 13 Nick Setta K; 89 Danny Young LS	National players: 56 (Germany) Richard Adjei OLB; 80 (Mexico) Alejandro Gamez WR; 74 (Germany) Peter Heyer G; 44 (Sweden) Joakim Holm RB; 71 (Belgium) Patrice Majondo-Mwamba DT; 22 (France) Laurent Marceline RB; 27 (England) Onoh Ozongwu SS; 2 (Mexico) Gustavo Tella WR; 40 (Germany) Richard Yancy SS; Rookies in italics

== Schedule ==
Week	Date	Kickoff (Note: All times are in Central European Summer Time (CEST).)	Opponent	Results		Game site	Attendance
Week	Date	Kickoff	Opponent	Final score	Team record	Game site	Attendance
1	Saturday, April 2	7:00 p.m.	at Amsterdam Admirals	L 14–24	0–1	Amsterdam ArenA	10,234
2	Sunday, April 10	4:00 p.m.	Cologne Centurions	L 10–23	0–2	LTU arena	25,304
3	Saturday, April 16	7:00 p.m.	at Hamburg Sea Devils	L 24–31	0–3	AOL Arena	19,865
4	Saturday, April 23	7:00 p.m.	Berlin Thunder	L 28–30	0–4	LTU arena	20,399
5	Saturday, April 30	7:00 p.m.	at Frankfurt Galaxy	L 20–23	0–5	Waldstadion	27,439
6	Saturday, May 7	7:00 p.m.	Hamburg Sea Devils	W 24–19	1–5	LTU arena	18,632
7	Saturday, May 14	6:00 p.m.	at Berlin Thunder	L 15–24	1–6	Olympic Stadium	16,695
8	Saturday, May 21	7:00 p.m.	Frankfurt Galaxy	L 13–20	1–7	LTU arena	28,124
9	Sunday, May 29	4:00 p.m.	at Cologne Centurions	W 28–16	2–7	RheinEnergieStadion	32,521
10	Saturday, June 4	7:00 p.m.	Amsterdam Admirals	W 27–14	3–7	LTU arena	20,203

== Standings ==
NFL Europe League
Team	W	L	T	PCT	PF	PA	Home	Road	STK
Berlin Thunder	7	3	0	.700	241	191	4–1	3–2	L1
Amsterdam Admirals	6	4	0	.600	265	204	5–0	1–4	L1
Cologne Centurions	6	4	0	.600	188	212	3–2	3–2	W1
Hamburg Sea Devils	5	5	0	.500	213	196	4–1	1–4	W1
Frankfurt Galaxy	3	7	0	.300	163	246	2–3	1–4	L2
Rhein Fire	3	7	0	.300	203	224	2–3	1–4	W2

== Game summaries ==
=== Week 1: at Amsterdam Admirals ===
Week One: Rhein Fire at Amsterdam Admirals – Game summary

Quarter	1	2	3	4	Total
Rhein	0	3	3	8	14
Amsterdam	7	0	3	14	24

at Amsterdam ArenA, Amsterdam, Netherlands

- Date: Saturday, April 2
- Game time: 7:07 p.m. CEST
- Game weather: 55 °F (12.8 °C), roof open, clear skies
- Game attendance: 10,234
- Referee: Walt Anderson

=== Week 2: vs Cologne Centurions ===
Week Two: Cologne Centurions at Rhein Fire – Game summary

Quarter	1	2	3	4	Total
Cologne	6	3	7	7	23
Rhein	0	3	0	7	10

at LTU arena, Düsseldorf, Germany

- Date: Sunday, April 10
- Game time: 4:04 p.m. CEST
- Game weather: 48 °F (8.9 °C), roof closed
- Game attendance: 25,304
- Referee: Jerome Boger

=== Week 3: at Hamburg Sea Devils ===
Week Three: Rhein Fire at Hamburg Sea Devils – Game summary

Quarter	1	2	3	4	Total
Rhein	0	0	7	17	24
Hamburg	10	21	0	0	31

at AOL Arena, Hamburg, Germany

- Date: Saturday, April 16
- Game time: 7:06 p.m. CEST
- Game weather: 59 °F (15.0 °C), clear skies
- Game attendance: 19,865
- Referee: Alberto Riveron

=== Week 4: vs Berlin Thunder ===
Week Four: Berlin Thunder at Rhein Fire – Game summary

Quarter	1	2	3	4	Total
Berlin	7	7	0	16	30
Rhein	7	7	7	7	28

at LTU arena, Düsseldorf, Germany

- Date: Saturday, April 23
- Game time: 7:04 p.m. CEST
- Game weather: 58 °F (14.4 °C), roof open, sunny with clouds
- Game attendance: 20,399
- Referee: Carl Cheffers

=== Week 5: at Frankfurt Galaxy ===
Week Five: Rhein Fire at Frankfurt Galaxy – Game summary

Quarter	1	2	3	4	Total
Rhein	7	6	0	7	20
Frankfurt	0	7	9	7	23

at Waldstadion, Frankfurt, Germany

- Date: Saturday, April 30
- Game time: 7:07 p.m. CEST
- Game weather: 73 °F (22.8 °C), sunny
- Game attendance: 27,439
- Referee: Gerald Austin

=== Week 6: vs Hamburg Sea Devils ===
Week Six: Hamburg Sea Devils at Rhein Fire – Game summary

Quarter	1	2	3	4	Total
Hamburg	0	6	7	6	19
Rhein	7	7	10	0	24

at LTU arena, Düsseldorf, Germany

- Date: Saturday, May 7
- Game time: 7:06 p.m. CEST
- Game weather: 45 °F (7.28 °C), roof closed
- Game attendance: 18,632
- Referee: Craig Wrolstad

=== Week 7: at Berlin Thunder ===
Week Seven: Rhein Fire at Berlin Thunder – Game summary

Quarter	1	2	3	4	Total
Rhein	0	12	3	0	15
Berlin	0	10	7	7	24

at Olympic Stadium, Berlin, Germany

- Date: Saturday, May 14
- Game time: 6:05 p.m. CEST
- Game weather: 57 °F (14 °C), cloudy with rain
- Game attendance: 16,695
- Referee: Gene Steratore

=== Week 8: vs Frankfurt Galaxy ===
Week Eight: Frankfurt Galaxy at Rhein Fire – Game summary

Quarter	1	2	3	4	Total
Frankfurt	7	10	3	0	20
Rhein	0	0	3	10	13

at LTU arena, Düsseldorf, Germany

- Date: Saturday, May 21
- Game time: 7:06 p.m. CEST
- Game weather: 61 °F (16.24 °C), cloudy
- Game attendance: 28,124
- Referee: Jerome Boger

=== Week 9: at Cologne Centurions ===
Week Nine: Rhein Fire at Cologne Centurions – Game summary

Quarter	1	2	3	4	Total
Rhein	0	14	7	7	28
Cologne	0	0	7	9	16

at RheinEnergieStadion, Cologne, Germany

- Date: Sunday, May 29
- Game time: 4:06 p.m. CEST
- Game weather: 72 °F (22.4 °C), mostly cloudy
- Game attendance: 32,521
- Referee: Walt Coleman

=== Week 10: vs Amsterdam Admirals ===
Week Ten: Amsterdam Admirals at Rhein Fire – Game summary

Quarter	1	2	3	4	Total
Amsterdam	0	0	0	14	14
Rhein	0	10	3	14	27

at LTU arena, Düsseldorf, Germany

- Date: Saturday, June 4
- Game time: 7:08 p.m. CEST
- Game weather: 68 °F (20.16 °C), roof closed
- Game attendance: 20,203
- Referee: Gene Steratore
