= 2005 Amsterdam Admirals season =

NFL Europe team season

- General manager: Ronald Buys
- Head coach: Bart Andrus
- Home stadium: Amsterdam ArenA

Results
- Record: 6–4
- Division place: 2nd
- Playoffs: World Bowl XIII champions

The 2005 Amsterdam Admirals season was the 11th season for the franchise in the NFL Europe League (NFLEL). The team was led by head coach Bart Andrus in his fifth year, and played its home games at Amsterdam ArenA in Amsterdam, Netherlands. They finished the regular season in second place with a record of six wins and four losses. In World Bowl XIII, Amsterdam defeated the Berlin Thunder 27–21. The victory marked the franchise's first and only World Bowl championship.

== Offseason ==
=== Free agent draft ===
2005 Amsterdam Admirals NFLEL free agent draft selections
Draft order		Player name	Position	College
Round	Choice	Player name	Position	College
1	4	Andy King	G	Illinois State
2	10	Jeremy Caudill	DT	Kentucky
3	15	Clint Mitchell	DE	Florida
4	22	Tyler Lenda	G	Penn State
5	27	Dewitt Ellerbe	CB	South Carolina State
6	34	Derrius Monroe	DE	Virginia Tech
7	39	Phil Archer	LB	Western Illinois
8	43	Greg Carothers	LB	Washington

== Personnel ==
=== Staff ===
2005 Amsterdam Admirals staff
Front office: General Manager – Ronald Buys; Head coaches: Head Coach – Bart Andrus; Offensive coaches: Offensive Coordinator/Wide Receivers – John Allen; Tight Ends – Robert Hunt; Offensive Line – Don Lawrence	Defensive coaches: Defensive Coordinator/Linebackers – Darryl Sims; Defensive Line – Rex Norris; National Coach/Linebackers – John Leijten; Defensive Backs/Special Teams – Richard Kent; Assistant Defensive Backs – Antonio Banks; Strength and conditioning: Strength and Conditioning – Joseph Benes

=== Roster ===
2005 Amsterdam Admirals final roster
Quarterbacks: 7 Casey Clausen; 5 Gibran Hamdan; 15 Kurt Kittner; Running backs: 33 Jarrett Payton; 21 Jonathan Smith; Wide receivers: 81 John Booth; 80 Ataveus Cash; 85 Ruvell Martin; 82 Carlos Perez; Tight ends: 87 Tony Donald; 83 Mike Gomez	Offensive linemen: 60 Ben Archibald T; 77 Ulish Booker T; 71 Ben Herrell T; 61 Trevor Hutton G; 70 Ben Johnson G/T; 65 Andy King G; 72 Tyler Lenda G; 63 Chad Setterstrom C; Defensive linemen: 96 Jeremy Caudill DT; 94 Earl Cochran DT/DE; 93 Omari Hand DE; 90 Norman Heuer DT; 98 Josh Mallard DE; 95 Clint Mitchell DE; 99 Derrius Monroe DE/DT	Linebackers: 45 Phil Archer MLB; 44 Derrick Ballard OLB; 52 Josh Buhl OLB; 43 Greg Carothers OLB; 55 Travis Carroll MLB; 57 John Garrett OLB; Defensive backs: 23 Scott Connot SS; 38 Dewitt Ellerbe CB; 25 Ron Israel FS; 29 Chonn Lacey SS; 36 Norman LeJeune FS; 24 Sam Massey CB; 40 Jonathan Palafox CB; 20 Jeff Sanchez CB; 30 B. J. Tucker CB; Special teams: 8 Ryan Dutton P; 9 Chris Snyder K	National players: 50 (Sweden) Carl-Johan Björk MLB; 35 (Netherlands) Amilcar Grot CB; 18 (Japan) Noriaki Kinoshita WR; 97 (Mexico) Mauricio Lopez DT; 79 (Mexico) Cesar Loredo T; 22 (France) Sandino Octobre RB; 88 (France) Yoan Schnee TE; 86 (Japan) Satoshi Shimizu WR; Rookies in italics

== Schedule ==
Week	Date	Kickoff (Note: All times are in Central European Summer Time (CEST).)	Opponent	Results		Game site	Attendance
Week	Date	Kickoff	Opponent	Final score	Team record	Game site	Attendance
1	Saturday, April 2	7:00 p.m.	Rhein Fire	W 24–14	1–0	Amsterdam ArenA	10,234
2	Saturday, April 9	7:00 p.m.	at Frankfurt Galaxy	L 14–23	1–1	Waldstadion	31,644
3	Saturday, April 16	7:00 p.m.	Berlin Thunder	W 31–27	2–1	Amsterdam ArenA	10,131
4	Saturday, April 23	6:00 p.m.	at Cologne Centurions	W 37–24	3–1	RheinEnergieStadion	8,863
5	Saturday, April 30	6:00 p.m.	at Berlin Thunder	L 16–27	3–2	Olympic Stadium	16,109
6	Sunday, May 8	3:00 p.m.	Frankfurt Galaxy	W 48–10	4–2	Amsterdam ArenA	13,227
7	Saturday, May 14	7:00 p.m.	at Hamburg Sea Devils	L 24–30 ^{OT}	4–3	AOL Arena	16,415
8	Monday, May 23	8:00 p.m.	Cologne Centurions	W 30–12	5–3	Amsterdam ArenA	14,423
9	Sunday, May 29	3:00 p.m.	Hamburg Sea Devils	W 27–10	6–3	Amsterdam ArenA	16,371
10	Saturday, June 4	7:00 p.m.	at Rhein Fire	L 14–27	6–4	LTU arena	20,203
World Bowl XIII
11	Saturday, June 11	5:00 p.m.	Berlin Thunder	W 27–21	7–4	LTU arena	35,134

== Standings ==
NFL Europe League
Team	W	L	T	PCT	PF	PA	Home	Road	STK
Berlin Thunder	7	3	0	.700	241	191	4–1	3–2	L1
Amsterdam Admirals	6	4	0	.600	265	204	5–0	1–4	L1
Cologne Centurions	6	4	0	.600	188	212	3–2	3–2	W1
Hamburg Sea Devils	5	5	0	.500	213	196	4–1	1–4	W1
Frankfurt Galaxy	3	7	0	.300	163	246	2–3	1–4	L2
Rhein Fire	3	7	0	.300	203	224	2–3	1–4	W2

== Game summaries ==
=== Week 1: vs Rhein Fire ===
Week One: Rhein Fire at Amsterdam Admirals – Game summary

Quarter	1	2	3	4	Total
Rhein	0	3	3	8	14
Amsterdam	7	0	3	14	24

at Amsterdam ArenA, Amsterdam, Netherlands

- Date: Saturday, April 2
- Game time: 7:07 p.m. CEST
- Game weather: 55 °F (12.8 °C), roof open, clear skies
- Game attendance: 10,234
- Referee: Walt Anderson

=== Week 2: at Frankfurt Galaxy ===
Week Two: Amsterdam Admirals at Frankfurt Galaxy – Game summary

Quarter	1	2	3	4	Total
Amsterdam	14	0	0	0	14
Frankfurt	0	7	13	3	23

at Waldstadion, Frankfurt, Germany

- Date: Saturday, April 9
- Game time: 7:09 p.m. CEST
- Game weather: 53 °F (11.7 °C), overcast
- Game attendance: 31,644
- Referee: Gene Steratore

=== Week 3: vs Berlin Thunder ===
Week Three: Berlin Thunder at Amsterdam Admirals – Game summary

Quarter	1	2	3	4	Total
Berlin	3	3	7	14	27
Amsterdam	0	3	14	14	31

at Amsterdam ArenA, Amsterdam, Netherlands

- Date: Saturday, April 16
- Game time: 7:07 p.m. CEST
- Game weather: 62 °F (16.7 °C), roof closed
- Game attendance: 10,131
- Referee: John Parry

=== Week 4: at Cologne Centurions ===
Week Four: Amsterdam Admirals at Cologne Centurions – Game summary

Quarter	1	2	3	4	Total
Amsterdam	7	20	7	3	37
Cologne	10	7	0	7	24

at RheinEnergieStadion, Cologne, Germany

- Date: Saturday, April 23
- Game time: 6:08 p.m. CEST
- Game weather: 59 °F (15.0 °C), cloudy
- Game attendance: 8,863
- Referee: Alberto Riveron

=== Week 5: at Berlin Thunder ===
Week Five: Amsterdam Admirals at Berlin Thunder – Game summary

Quarter	1	2	3	4	Total
Amsterdam	3	7	3	3	16
Berlin	7	3	7	10	27

at Olympic Stadium, Berlin, Germany

- Date: Saturday, April 30
- Game time: 6:05 p.m. CEST
- Game weather: 72 °F (22.2 °C), cloudy
- Game attendance: 16,109
- Referee: Craig Wrolstad

=== Week 6: vs Frankfurt Galaxy ===
Week Six: Frankfurt Galaxy at Amsterdam Admirals – Game summary

Quarter	1	2	3	4	Total
Frankfurt	3	0	7	0	10
Amsterdam	7	24	14	3	48

at Amsterdam ArenA, Amsterdam, Netherlands

- Date: Sunday, May 8
- Game time: 3:05 p.m. CEST
- Game attendance: 13,227
- Referee: Larry Nemmers

=== Week 7: at Hamburg Sea Devils ===
Week Seven: Amsterdam Admirals at Hamburg Sea Devils – Game summary

Quarter	1	2	3	4	OT	Total
Amsterdam	14	3	0	7	0	24
Hamburg	0	13	3	8	6	30

at AOL Arena, Hamburg, Germany

- Date: Saturday, May 14
- Game time: 7:05 p.m. CEST
- Game weather: 61 °F (16.1 °C), cloudy
- Game attendance: 16,415
- Referee: Jerome Boger

=== Week 8: vs Cologne Centurions ===
Week Eight: Cologne Centurions at Amsterdam Admirals – Game summary

Quarter	1	2	3	4	Total
Cologne	6	6	0	0	12
Amsterdam	0	17	7	6	30

at Amsterdam ArenA, Amsterdam, Netherlands

- Date: Monday, May 23
- Game time: 8:17 p.m. CEST
- Game weather: 62 °F (16.8 °C), roof open, sunny
- Game attendance: 14,423
- Referee: Gene Steratore

=== Week 9: vs Hamburg Sea Devils ===
Week Nine: Hamburg Sea Devils at Amsterdam Admirals – Game summary

Quarter	1	2	3	4	Total
Hamburg	0	3	0	7	10
Amsterdam	3	3	14	7	27

at Amsterdam ArenA, Amsterdam, Netherlands

- Date: Sunday, May 29
- Game time: 3:05 p.m. CEST
- Game weather: 72 °F (22.2 °C), roof closed
- Game attendance: 16,371
- Referee: Carl Cheffers

=== Week 10: at Rhein Fire ===
Week Ten: Amsterdam Admirals at Rhein Fire – Game summary

Quarter	1	2	3	4	Total
Amsterdam	0	0	0	14	14
Rhein	0	10	3	14	27

at LTU arena, Düsseldorf, Germany

- Date: Saturday, June 4
- Game time: 7:08 p.m. CEST
- Game weather: 68 °F (20.16 °C), roof closed
- Game attendance: 20,203
- Referee: Gene Steratore

=== World Bowl XIII ===
World Bowl XIII: Amsterdam Admirals vs Berlin Thunder – Game summary

Quarter	1	2	3	4	Total
Amsterdam	7	10	7	3	27
Berlin	0	7	0	14	21

at LTU arena, Düsseldorf, Germany

- Date: Saturday, June 11
- Game time: 5:05 p.m. CEST
- Game weather: 57 °F (13.9 °C), roof closed
- Game attendance: 35,134
- Referee: Scott Green
- TV announcers (FOX): Curt Menefee and Brian Baldinger
