= Clarence LeBlanc =

Clarence LeBlanc may refer to:

- Clarence White (1944–1973), born Clarence Joseph LeBlanc, American bluegrass and country guitarist and singer
- Clarence LeBlanc (American football) (born 1977), American football safety
