= Thomas Herrion =

American football player (1981–2005)

- Herrion with the Utah Utes in 2003

No. 76
- Position: Offensive guard

Personal information
- Born: December 15, 1981; Fort Worth, Texas, U.S.
- Died: August 20, 2005 (aged 23); Denver, Colorado, U.S.
- Listed height: 6 ft 3 in (1.91 m)
- Listed weight: 320 lb (145 kg)

Career information
- High school: Polytechnic (Fort Worth)
- College: Kilgore (2000–2001); Utah (2002–2003)
- NFL draft: 2004: undrafted

Career history
- Dallas Cowboys (2004)*; San Francisco 49ers (2004–2005)*; → Hamburg Sea Devils (2005)
- * Offseason or practice squad member only

Thomas Lovell Herrion (December 15, 1981 – August 20, 2005) was an American football offensive guard in the National Football League (NFL) for the Dallas Cowboys and San Francisco 49ers. He also was a member of the Hamburg Sea Devils in NFL Europe. He played college football at the University of Utah.

== Early life ==
Herrion attended Polytechnic High School. He was a four-year starter at left tackle.

He competed in the discus throw and shot put, as a sophomore and junior. He played center on the basketball team as a sophomore.

== College career ==
Herrion enrolled at Kilgore College, to play under head coach Jimmy Rieves at the junior college level. As a freshman, he contributed to the Red River Bowl victory and the 2000 conference championship.

As a sophomore, he was part of a team that finished undefeated with a 12–0 record and a No. 4 national JUCO ranking, while receiving first-team All-Southwest Junior College Football Conference and honorable-mention JUCO All-America honors.

As a junior, he transferred to the University of Utah. He appeared in 10 games at right tackle, starting the final 3 contests.

As a senior, he played under new head coach Urban Meyer. He started all 12 games at left guard and received honorable-mention All-Mountain West Conference honors, while blocking for future San Francisco 49ers teammate and number one overall draft pick quarterback Alex Smith. He contributed to the team's Mountain West Conference championship and Liberty Bowl win. He finished his college career after appearing in a total of 22 games.

== Professional career ==
Herrion was signed as an undrafted free agent by the Dallas Cowboys after the 2004 NFL draft on May 20. On September 5, 2004, he was waived and later signed to the practice squad on September 14. On September 30, 2004, he was released from the practice squad.

On December 9, 2004, he was signed by the San Francisco 49ers to the practice squad.

On January 5, 2005, he signed a reserve/futures contract with the 49ers. In February 2005, he was allocated to the Hamburg Sea Devils of NFL Europe, where he started 10 games at left tackle and received an invitation to attend the 49ers training camp.

== Death ==
Shortly after an exhibition game against the Denver Broncos on August 20, 2005, Herrion collapsed in the locker room and was transported to St. Anthony's Central Hospital in Denver where he was pronounced dead. The cause of death was later determined to be ischaemic heart disease, or (according to a subsequent examination of the autopsy report) hypertrophic cardiomyopathy.

He was considered to be the NFL's fourth football-related death after Detroit Lions wide receiver Chuck Hughes died of a heart attack in a 1971 game against the Chicago Bears, St. Louis Cardinals tight end J.V. Cain had a fatal heart attack during training camp in 1979 and Minnesota Vikings offensive tackle Korey Stringer died of heatstroke during training camp in 2001.

On September 2, 2005, the 49ers established the Thomas Herrion Memorial Award, which will be given to the player who best exemplifies his spirit.

In 2006, the Kilgore College TRIO Learning Center was dedicated to Herrion's memory and renamed as the "Thomas L. Herrion TRIO Learning Center." In 2018, he was inducted into the Kilgore College Athletics Hall of Fame.

== Personal life ==
Herrion was a musician who played the drums in his church band. On the front page of the San Francisco Chronicle, former 49er coach Mike Nolan commended Herrion for being "musical".

== See also ==
- List of gridiron football players who died during their careers
