= Grangeville High School =

Coordinates: 45.919°N 116.131°W

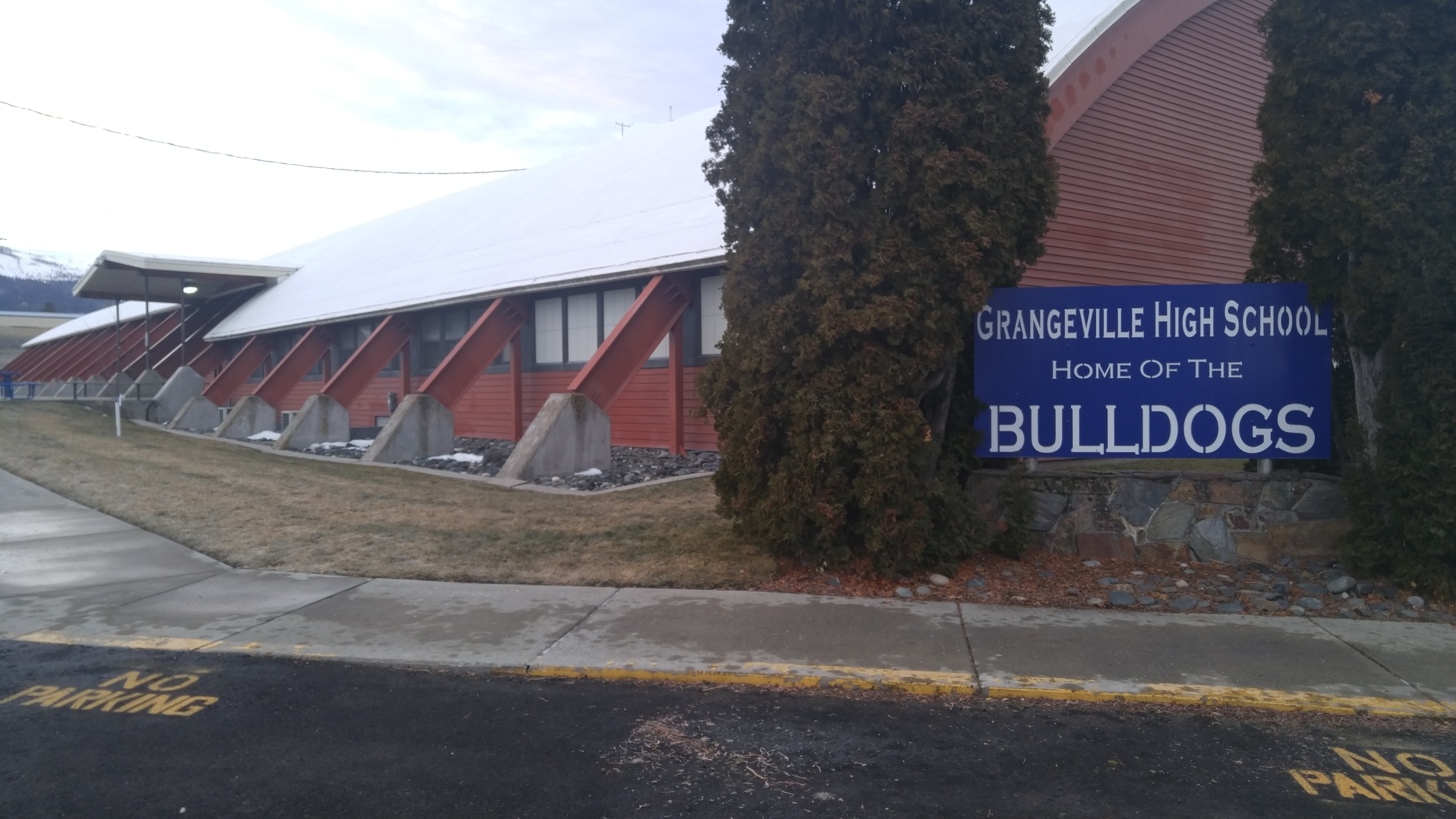

Location
- 910 S. D St. Grangeville, Idaho; United States

Information
- Type: Public
- Motto: Inspiring Success
- School district: Grangeville School District #246
- Principal: Amanda Bush
- Faculty: 17
- Teaching staff: 15.89 (FTE)
- Grades: 9–12
- Enrollment: 244 (2024–2025)
- Student to teacher ratio: 15.36
- Colors: Navy & White
- Athletics: IHSAA Class 2A
- Athletics conference: Central Idaho League
- Mascot: Bulldog
- Yearbook: Blue Camas
- Feeder schools: Grangeville Middle & Elementary School
- Elevation: 3,510 ft (1,070 m) AMSL
- Website: Grangeville High School

Location in the United States
Location in Idaho

Grangeville High School, is a four-year secondary school in Grangeville, Idaho, operated by the Grangeville School District 246. The school colors are navy blue and white and the mascot is a bulldog.

== Athletics ==
Grangeville competes in athletics in IHSAA Class 2A in the Central Idaho League with Orofino and St. Maries.

=== State titles ===
Boys

- Football (2): fall (2A) 2011, 2015 (official with introduction of A-2 playoffs in fall 1978, A-3 in 1977)
- Basketball (2): (A-2, now 3A) 1974, (2A) 2013
- Baseball (2): (A-3, now 2A) 1989, 2013 (records not kept by IHSAA, state tourney introduced in 1971, A-2 in 1980, A-3 in 1986)
- Track (4): (A-3, now 2A) 1995, 1997, 1998; (A-2, now 3A) 1999

Girls

- Basketball (8): (A-2, now 3A) 1977, 1979; (A-3, now 2A) 1994, 1996; (2A) 2004, 2005, 2008, 2011 (introduced in 1976)
- Track (1): (A-3, now 2A) 1996 (introduced in 1971)
- Tennis (0): (4A) (combined team until 2008)

Combined

- Tennis (0): (introduced in 1963, combined until 2008)-->

== Notable graduates ==
- Matt Hill (born 1978), NFL player
- Ken Schrom, MLB pitcher (1980–87), class of 1973
