= Clint Mitchell =

American football player (born 1980)

No. 98, 95
- Position: Defensive end

Personal information
- Born: September 21, 1980 (age 46); Austin, Texas, U.S.
- Listed height: 6 ft 7 in (2.01 m)
- Listed weight: 270 lb (122 kg)

Career information
- High school: Clearwater (FL) Countryside
- College: Florida
- NFL draft: 2003: 7th round, 227th overall pick

Career history
- Denver Broncos (2003); → Amsterdam Admirals (2004); Tampa Bay Storm (2005–2007)*; Amsterdam Admirals (2005); Kansas City Chiefs (2005–2006)*
- * Offseason or practice squad member only

Clint Mitchell (born September 21, 1980) is an American former professional football player who was a defensive end. Mitchell played college football for the Florida Gators. He was a member of the Denver Broncos, Amsterdam Admirals, Kansas City Chiefs and Tampa Bay Storm.

== Early life ==
Mitchell was born in Austin, Texas in 1980. He attended Countryside High School in Clearwater, Florida, where he played high school football for the Countryside Cougars. He is the younger brother of former NFL center Jeff Mitchell.

== College career ==
Mitchell received an athletic scholarship to attend the University of Florida in Gainesville, Florida, where he played for coach Steve Spurrier and coach Ron Zook's Gators teams from 1999 to 2002. He was an honorable mention All-Southeastern Conference (SEC) selection at defensive end in 2002.

== Professional career ==
=== Denver Broncos ===
The Denver Broncos selected Mitchell in the seventh round, with the 227th overall pick, of the 2003 NFL draft. He officially signed with the team on July 21, 2003. He was on the Broncos active roster during the 2003 season but did not play in a game. Mitchell was allocated to NFL Europe in 2004, where he played for the Amsterdam Admirals during the 2004 NFL Europe season. He played in 10 games, starting four, for the Admirals, recording 24 tackles, two sacks, two forced fumbles, two pass breakups and one blocked kick. He was waived by the Broncos on September 5, 2004.

=== Tampa Bay Storm ===
Mitchell was signed by the Tampa Bay Storm of the Arena Football League on December 1, 2004. He was placed on other league exempt on February 15, 2005 after being drafted by the Admirals. After being released by the Chiefs in September 2005, Mitchell was activated by the Storm on October 3, 2005. However, he did not play for the Storm during the 2006 season due to being re-signed by the Chiefs. He later returned to the Storm for the 2007 season after being released by the Chiefs again in September 2006. However, he was placed on injured reserve on February 26, 2007. Mitchell was waived by the Storm on February 15, 2008.

=== Amsterdam Admirals ===
In 2005, Mitchell was selected by the Admirals in the NFL Europe free agent draft. He appeared in 10 games, starting nine, during the 2005 season, totaling 19 tackles, four sacks, one forced fumble, one pass breakup and one blocked kick.

=== Kansas City Chiefs ===
Mitchell signed with the Kansas City Chiefs on June 20, 2005. He was waived on September 3, 2005. He later re-signed with the Chiefs on January 11, 2006. Mitchell was waived again on September 2 and signed to the team's practice squad on September 4. He was released on September 19, 2006.

== See also ==
- List of Florida Gators in the NFL draft
