= Blue Adams =

American gridiron football player and coach (born 1979)

Florida State Seminoles
- Title: Cornerbacks coach

Personal information
- Born: October 15, 1979 (age 47); Miami, Florida, U.S.
- Listed height: 5 ft 9 in (1.75 m)
- Listed weight: 182 lb (83 kg)

Career information
- Position: Cornerback (No. 26, 46)
- High school: Miami
- College: Cincinnati
- NFL draft: 2003: 7th round, 220th overall pick

Career history

Playing
- Detroit Lions (2003); Tampa Bay Buccaneers (2003)*; Jacksonville Jaguars (2003); Chicago Bears (2004)*; Tampa Bay Buccaneers (2005–2006); → Rhein Fire (2005); Cincinnati Bengals (2007); Atlanta Falcons (2008)*; Montreal Alouettes (2009)*
- * Offseason or practice squad member only

Coaching
- Purdue (2010) Graduate assistant; Northern Iowa (2011) Secondary coach; Miami Dolphins (2012–2015) Assistant defensive backs coach; West Virginia (2016) Cornerbacks coach; South Florida (2017–2018) Defensive backs coach; Oregon State (2019–2023) Secondary coach; Michigan State (2024–2025) Secondary coach; Florida State (2026–present) Cornerbacks coach

Awards and highlights
- All-NFL Europe (2005); Second-team All-C-USA (2001)

Career NFL statistics
- Total tackles: 52
- Sacks: 1
- Forced fumbles: 1
- Stats at Pro Football Reference
- Stats at CFL.ca (archive)

Danny L. "Blue" Adams (born October 15, 1979) is an American former professional football player who was a cornerback for four seasons in the National Football League (NFL). After playing college football for the Cincinnati Bearcats, he was selected by the Detroit Lions in the seventh round of the 2003 NFL draft. During his professional career, Adams was also a member of the Tampa Bay Buccaneers, Jacksonville Jaguars, Chicago Bears, Rhein Fire, Cincinnati Bengals, Atlanta Falcons, and Montreal Alouettes. He is currently the cornerbacks coach for the Florida State Seminoles.

== Early life ==
Adams played high school football at Miami Senior High School in Miami, Florida. As a senior, he won All-State Honorable Mention honors, and All-County first-team honors.

== College career ==
Adams played college football for the Cincinnati Bearcats from 1998 to 2002. He was medically redshirted in 1999. He earned second-team All-Conference USA honors in 2001 and was named Cincinnati's defensive MVP in 2002. Adams graduated from Cincinnati with a bachelor's degree in criminal justice in 2003.

== Professional career ==
=== Detroit Lions ===
Adams was selected by the Detroit Lions in the seventh round, with the 220th overall pick, of the 2003 NFL draft. He officially signed with the team on July 23, 2003. He was waived on September 8, 2003.

=== Tampa Bay Buccaneers (first stint) ===
Adams was signed to the practice squad of the Tampa Bay Buccaneers on September 10, 2003.

=== Jacksonville Jaguars ===
On October 8, 2003, Adams was signed by the Jacksonville Jaguars off of the Buccaneers' practice squad. He played in eight games for the Jaguars in 2003, recording three solo tackles and one assisted tackle. He re-signed with them on March 22, 2004. Adams was waived on August 30, 2004.

=== Chicago Bears ===
Adams signed with the Chicago Bears on August 31, 2004. He was waived on September 5, 2004.

=== Tampa Bay Buccaneers (second stint) ===
Adams signed a reserve/future contract with the Buccaneers on January 10, 2005. He was allocated to NFL Europe in 2005, where he played for the Rhein Fire during the 2005 NFL Europe season. He started all 10 games for the Fire, recording 46 tackles, 16 pass breakups and three interceptions (one of which was returned for a touchdown). Adams earned All-NFL Europe honors in 2005.

Adams appeared in 13 games for the Buccaneers during the 2005 season, totaling 11 solo tackles and three assisted tackles. He played in a career-high 16 games in 2006, accumulating 18 solo tackles, one assisted tackle and one forced fumble.

=== Cincinnati Bengals ===
Adams was signed by the Cincinnati Bengals on May 7, 2007. He was waived by the Bengals on September 2 but re-signed on September 26, 2007. He appeared in 13 games for the Bengals in 2007, recording 13 solo tackles, two assisted tackles and one sack. Adams was released on July 24, 2008.

=== Atlanta Falcons ===
Adams signed with the Atlanta Falcons on July 26, 2008. He was released on September 2, 2008.

=== Montreal Alouettes ===
Adams was signed by the Montreal Alouettes of the Canadian Football League on January 14, 2009. He was released on June 25, 2009.

== Coaching career ==
Adams was a graduate assistant for the Purdue Boilermakers, assisting with the defense, in 2010.

He was the secondary coach for the Northern Iowa Panthers in 2011.

Adams was an assistant defensive backs coach for the Miami Dolphins from 2012 to 2015.

On March 7, 2016, Adams returned to the collegiate level as the cornerbacks coach for the West Virginia Mountaineers.

On February 7, 2017, Adams was hired as the defensive backs coach for the South Florida Bulls team. He coached two seasons with the team from 2017 to 2018.

Adams served as the secondary coach at Oregon State from 2019 to 2023.

In 2024, he joined the Michigan State Spartans as a secondary coach.

In 2025, he joined the Florida State Seminoles as a Cornerbacks coach.
