= Joe Hall (American football) =

American football player (born 1979)

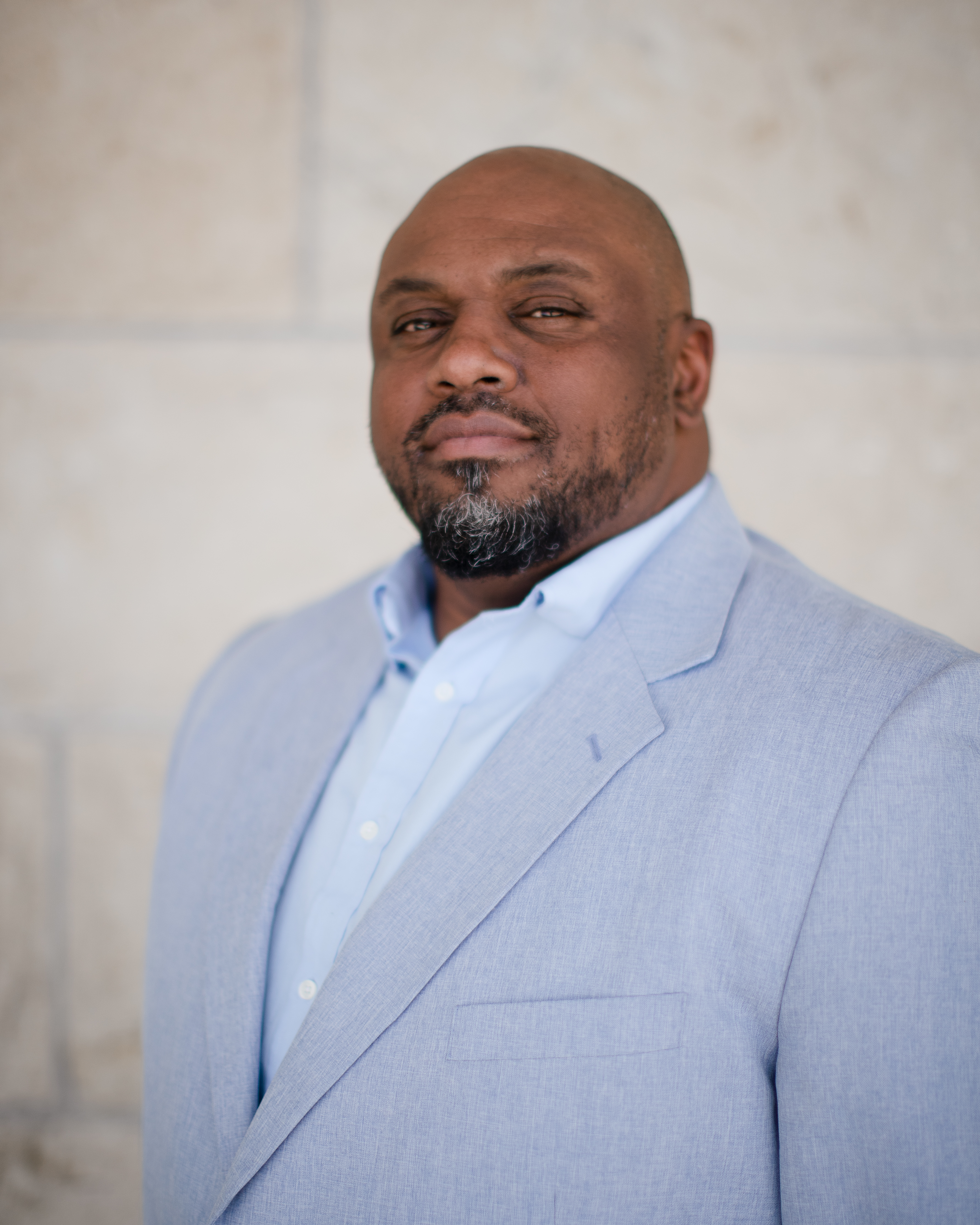

South Florida Bulls
- Title: Director of player development

Personal information
- Born: November 3, 1979 (age 47); Compton, California, U.S.
- Listed height: 6 ft 1 in (1.85 m)
- Listed weight: 300 lb (136 kg)

Career information
- High school: Artesia (CA)
- College: Palomar (1997–1998); Kansas State (1999–2001)
- NFL draft: 2002: undrafted

Career history

Playing
- St. Louis Rams (2002)*; Kansas City Chiefs (2003–2005)*; Rhein Fire (2005); Oakland Raiders (2006)*
- * Offseason or practice squad member only

Coaching
- MidAmerica Nazarene (2012–2013) Wide receivers coach; MidAmerica Nazarene (2014) Running backs coach

Operations
- Kansas State (2019–2025) Director of football student-athlete development; South Florida (2026–present) Director of player development

Awards and highlights
- First-team NJCAA All-American (1998); California Offensive Player of the Year (1998); California Community Colleges Football Association Hall of Fame (2015); Palomar College Athletic Hall of Fame (2016)

Joe Luther Hall Jr. (born November 3, 1979) is an American football administrator, coach, and former fullback / running back who is currently the director of player development for the South Florida Bulls. After attending Artesia High School in California, he played college football at Palomar College and Kansas State, leading the former to the national junior college championship as a sophomore. At Kansas State, Hall spent three seasons, redshirting one, being described at over 300 pounds "the largest running back to ever rush for 100 yards in an NCAA game" by Sports Illustrated. Following his time at Kansas State, he spent several seasons in the National Football League (NFL) with the St. Louis Rams, Kansas City Chiefs, and Oakland Raiders as well as in NFL Europe with the Rhein Fire. Before working at South Florida, Hall served from 2019 to 2025 as director of football student-athlete development for the Kansas State Wildcats.

== Early life and education ==
Hall was born on November 3, 1979, in Compton, California. Weighing 265 pounds by high school, he played football, baseball, and basketball at Artesia High School. He had not played football before joining Artesia, but was able to convince the coaches to allow him to play running back and scored 35 touchdowns on the junior varsity team. "I was bigger and faster than everybody," he said. "I'd just take the ball and run until someone stopped me. At my size, no one wanted to tackle me." As a senior, despite playing in only seven games, Hall managed to run for 1,997 yards and 30 touchdowns.

In basketball, Hall was an All-CIF Southern Section player. In baseball, he was an All-American as an outfielder and in 1997, Hall was drafted in the 29th round (865th overall) of the Major League Baseball draft by the Detroit Tigers. He declined the offer to be in the Tigers' farm system, stating he wanted to play college football and baseball. When Hall tried to join a four-year school, he failed to fully qualify academically, which revealed his "biggest weakness," according to the North County Times, which Hall stated was "staying focused on and off the field. I get bored."

=== Palomar College ===
Rather than sit out for a year at a four-year school, Hall decided to enroll at Palomar College, a junior college and thus two-year institution, in 1997. He was 280 pounds upon joining Palomar, but near the end of his first football season "got bored" and began eating, going up to 290 pounds for the team's bowl game. He finished his freshman season with 733 rushing yards, good enough to be named the team's most valuable player.

Hall had his best collegiate season as a sophomore in 1998, leading Palomar to the national championship with an 11–1 record while setting school records for single-season rushing yards (1,647) and single-game rushing yards, being named first-team All-American by the J. C. Grid Wire as well as the California Offensive Player of the Year. What made his rushing totals "even more impressive," according to the North County Times, was that Palomar was a pass-heavy team, although their coach admitted that Hall "made us adjust."

Among his notable performances in the 1998 season were games against Mt. San Antonio College, the defending national champion, where he ran 42 times for 187 yards and two scores in an upset victory; City College of San Francisco, where he scored two touchdowns to win the state and national championship; Pasadena Junior College, where he ran for 246 yards and three touchdowns; and Saddleback College, where he set the all-time school record with 261 rushing yards. Hall finished his two-year stint at Palomar as holder of the all-time team record for career rushing, having gained 2,437 yards, a record that still stands.

=== Kansas State University ===
Hall was recruited by many NCAA Division I schools, although some of them wanted to change his position to blocker or the defensive line, each of which he rejected as he said he didn't want to become "a glorified offensive lineman." As signing day approached, Hall narrowed down his offers to the Kansas State University Wildcats, the University of Nevada, Las Vegas (UNLV) Rebels, and the University of Hawaiʻi at Mānoa Rainbow Warriors. He had verbally committed to Kansas State, but then at the last minute, the University of Southern California (USC) Trojans "made a hard run" at him. Although Hall had stated USC was his "dream school," he opted to remain at Kansas State, saying "I gave my word to Kansas State, and your word has to mean something."

Hall later said that the Kansas State coaching staff had promised he would not be a blocker on the football team. When he arrived for practice weighing 310 pounds, he was asked to learn how to become a lead blocker. Believing he was misled ("I grew up in a house where if somebody told me they were going to do something, they did it," he said), Hall "rebelled" against the staff and as a result, became the third-string at his position.

Eventually accepting his position as a fullback, Hall made his debut against Temple in the season-opener and ran for 22 yards. He ran for 12 yards in their second game, against UTEP, before recording 39 yards and a touchdown against Iowa State the following week. Following injuries to David Allen and Frank Murphy, Hall became the top back for Kansas State's game against Utah State. In his first game as the main back, Hall ran for 195 yards and scored two touchdowns, helping the Wildcats win and hold Utah State scoreless, 40–0. Afterwards, Sports Illustrated wrote about Hall and described him as "the largest running back to ever rush for 100 yards in an NCAA game."

Being heralded as the "biggest tailback in America," Hall recorded his second consecutive 100-yard game the following week versus Oklahoma State, gaining 112 yards on 27 carries. Against Baylor in their next game, Hall made his third straight 100-yard performance, gaining 109 in the win. Hall ran for 50 yards on 18 attempts against Colorado, but then was ordered to appear in court for municipal alcohol infractions and missed the game against Nebraska.

By this point in the season, Hall had run for 603 yards, leading the team. He only ran for 10 combined yards in the final two games, finishing the season with 613 rushing yards and six touchdowns, still good enough to lead the team, in addition to three receptions for 39 yards. In the classroom, Hall reportedly had "sub-par" grades, including several classes that were marked as "incomplete," and in January 2000 Hall dropped out and became academically ineligible to play football. Although his coach announced he was "making progress toward regaining his eligibility" in April, Hall ended up missing spring practice and in July was ruled out for the 2000 season.

While not playing football in 2000 and early 2001, Hall got into legal trouble multiple times: in June 2000, he was arrested for carrying a concealed weapon; in November 2000, he was convicted for falsely reporting a crime; and in March 2001, he was convicted for driving on a suspended license. Later, with the help of coach Bill Snyder, Hall learned "accountability" and changed, saying that his past actions were "a childish act ... [but] I'm not a child anymore ... I'm past it." He worked on getting back eligibility and eventually was able to make the team, making his return in the second game of the season, where he ran for 30 yards in a 64–0 win against New Mexico State.

Hall saw limited action as a runner and was mainly used as a blocker in 2001, only rushing for 251 yards on 39 carries (a 6.4 yards-per-carry average) while scoring three touchdowns. He had one of his best games against Louisiana Tech on November 17, running three times for 81 yards and a touchdown, including a 61-yard rush where he was downed at the one-yard-line, the longest rush of the season for Kansas State. He finished his two-season stint at Kansas State with 160 carries for 864 yards, scoring nine touchdowns while averaging 5.4 yards per carry.

== Professional career ==
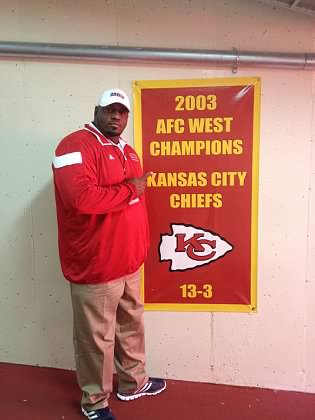
Hall next to the 2003 Kansas City Chiefs division championship banner

Pre-draft measurables
Height	Weight	Arm length	Hand span	40-yard dash	10-yard split	20-yard split	Vertical jump	Broad jump	Bench press
6 ft 2 in (1.88 m)	277 lb (126 kg)	33 in (0.84 m)	8 1/2 in (0.22 m)	5.00 s	1.70 s	2.89 s	28 in (0.71 m)	8 ft 11 in (2.72 m)	22 reps
All results from NFL Scouting Combine

Although Hall had weighed up to 340 pounds during his time at Kansas State, he dropped his weight down to 277 for the start of his National Football League (NFL) career. He went unselected in the 2002 NFL draft, but afterwards was signed by the St. Louis Rams as an undrafted free agent. He was released before the start of training camp. Afterwards, Hall decided to re-enroll at Kansas State to finish his studies, as he had not yet received a degree. He was promised that "if he demonstrated any maturity and finished up his classwork, [coach Bill] Snyder would use his connections to get Hall another NFL tryout."

Hall finished his education in April 2003, and immediately after signed a contract with the Kansas City Chiefs. Upon joining the Chiefs, he weighed 318 pounds as a fullback, being described by head coach Dick Vermeil as "catch[ing] my eye every time I come onto the field." Although Hall impressed in training camp and in preseason, he ended up being released at the final roster cuts on September 1. He was later brought back as a member of the practice squad. Hall spent the entire 2003 season as a practice squad player, as the Chiefs went 13–3 in the regular season, before losing to the Indianapolis Colts in the playoffs.

Hall was released by Kansas City in June 2004. He was later brought back in the offseason of 2005. He was assigned to the Rhein Fire of NFL Europe, where he appeared in four games, each as a starter, and recorded a touchdown and eight receptions for 66 yards. Upon returning to the Chiefs, he was placed on the injured reserve list. Hall was a member of the Oakland Raiders, his final team, in 2006, being placed on injured reserve in August before being released with a settlement in September.

== Later life ==
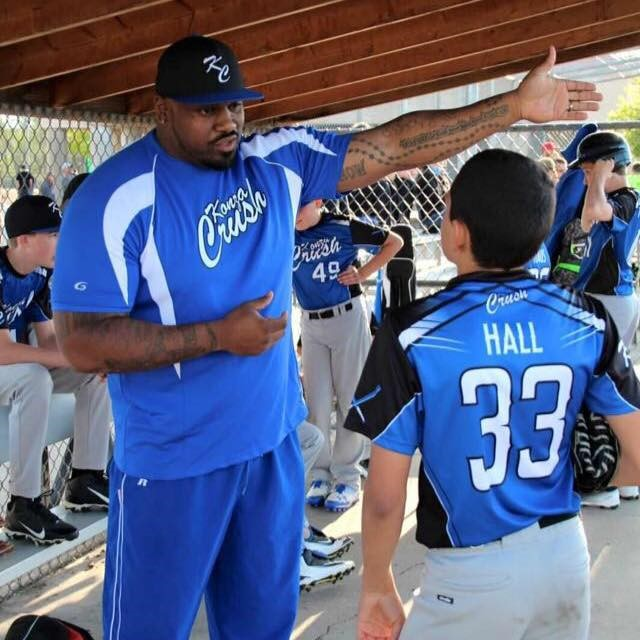
Hall with his son, Joe III

After his playing career, Hall became a coach for the MidAmerica Nazarene Pioneers of the National Association of Intercollegiate Athletics (NAIA), serving two seasons as wide receivers coach and one as a running backs coach. Following his time at MidAmerica Nazarene, he began working off-the-field as a counselor and behavior interventionist at multiple northeastern Kansas schools, such as Topeka West High School and Junction City High School.

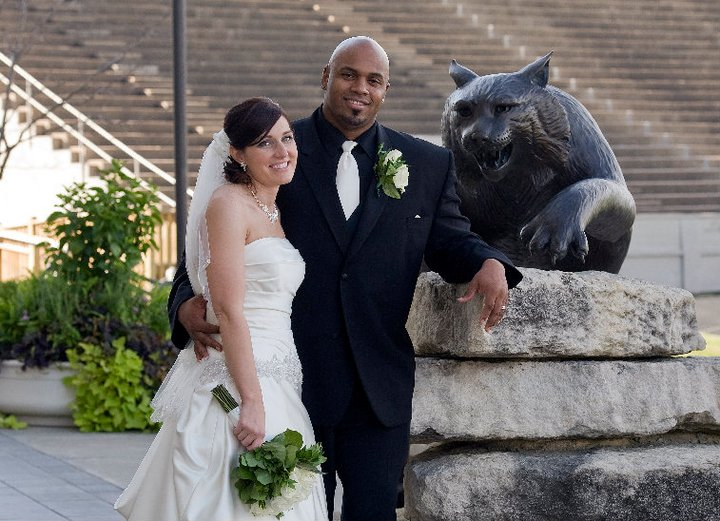
Hall with his wife, Hollie

In 2015, Hall was inducted into the California Community Colleges Football Association Hall of Fame. The following year, he was inducted into the Palomar College Athletic Hall of Fame. In 2019, he was hired by his alma mater, Kansas State, to serve as director of football student-athlete development. In this position, Hall "creates, develops and implements a student-athlete development program," which "fosters an environment of well-being and achievement." He is also the liaison of the football team to several school support areas, including the athletic trainers, sport psychologists, and strength and conditioning coaches, in addition to the liaison between the Wildcats and university and community organizations. In 2026, he became director of player development for the South Florida Bulls.

Hall received a bachelor's degree from Kansas State in 2012, a master's of science from MidAmerica Nazarene in 2015, and a master's in school counseling from Kansas State in 2017. As of 2022, Hall is working on earning a doctorate in organizational leadership.

With his wife, Hollie, Hall has four children, including Joe III, who currently plays at Kansas State. Hall published a book, titled Pay for Play: High Stake and Mental State, which he described as his "pseudo-autobiography," in 2022.
