= Matt Hill (American football) =

American football player (born 1978)

No. 74, 77
- Position: Offensive tackle

Personal information
- Born: November 10, 1978 (age 47); Grangeville, Idaho, U.S.
- Listed height: 6 ft 6 in (1.98 m)
- Listed weight: 304 lb (138 kg)

Career information
- High school: Grangeville (Idaho)
- College: Boise State (1997–2001)
- NFL draft: 2002: 5th round, 271st overall pick

Career history
- Seattle Seahawks (2002–2003); Rhein Fire (2005); Carolina Panthers (2005)
- Stats at Pro Football Reference

Matt Hill (born November 10, 1978) is an American former professional football offensive tackle who played two seasons with the Seattle Seahawks of the National Football League (NFL). He was selected by the Seahawks in the fifth round of the 2002 NFL draft after playing college football at Boise State University. He was also a member of the Rhein Fire and Carolina Panthers.

== Early life and college ==
Matt Hill was born on November 10, 1978, in Grangeville, Idaho, and attended Grangeville High School there. He redshirted for the Boise State Broncos in 1997 and was a letterman from 1998 to 2001.

== Professional career ==
Hill was selected by the Seattle Seahawks with the 271st pick in the 2002 NFL draft. He officially signed with the team on July 25, 2002. He played in 13 games for the Seahawks in 2002. He appeared in 13 games, starting two, during the 2003 season. He was released by the Seahawks on September 5, 2004.

Hill signed with the Carolina Panthers on January 12, 2005. He was allocated to NFL Europe on January 22, 2005 and assigned to the Rhein Fire on February 15, 2005. He played in seven games, starting six, for the Fire in 2005. He was placed on the non-football injury list on September 3, 2005. He was released by the Panthers on March 2, 2006.
