= T. J. Cottrell =

American football player (born 1982)

No. 85, 84, 88
- Position: Tight end

Personal information
- Born: May 3, 1982; Buffalo, New York, U.S.
- Died: November 12, 2025 (aged 44)
- Listed height: 6 ft 5 in (1.96 m)
- Listed weight: 255 lb (116 kg)

Career information
- College: Buffalo State
- NFL draft: 2004: undrafted

Career history
- Minnesota Vikings (2004)*; Rhein Fire (2005); Minnesota Vikings (2005); Frankfurt Galaxy (2007); San Diego Chargers (2007)*; Rochester Raiders (2008); New York Sentinels (2009)
- * Offseason or practice squad member only

Theodore John Cottrell Jr. (born May 3, 1982) was an American former professional football tight end. He was signed by the Minnesota Vikings of the National Football League (NFL) as an undrafted free agent in 2004. He played college football at Buffalo State College. Cottrell was also a member of the Rhein Fire, Frankfurt Galaxy, San Diego Chargers, Rochester Raiders and New York Sentinels. He is the son of former NFL linebacker Ted Cottrell; in all of his NFL and UFL appearances, T. J. was on a team where his father was coaching at the time.
