= 2005 Cologne Centurions season =

NFL Europe team season

- General manager: Jacques Orthen
- Head coach: Peter Vaas
- Home stadium: RheinEnergieStadion

Results
- Record: 6–4
- Division place: 3rd
- Playoffs: did not qualify

The 2005 season was the second season for the Cologne Centurions in the NFL Europe League (NFLEL). The team was led by head coach Peter Vaas in his second year, and played its home games at RheinEnergieStadion in Cologne, Germany. They finished the regular season in third place with a record of six wins and four losses.

== Offseason ==
=== Free agent draft ===
2005 Cologne Centurions NFLEL free agent draft selections
Draft order		Player name	Position	College
Round	Choice	Player name	Position	College
1	3	Omar Nazel	DE	Southern California
2	9	Ryan Wingrove	DE	Bowling Green
3	16	Bobby Brooks	LB	Fresno State
4	21	Eric Powell	DE	Florida State
5	28	Zach Wilson	G	Southern California
6	33	Tam Hopkins	G	Ohio State
7	40	Hart Turner	TE	South Carolina

== Personnel ==
=== Staff ===
2005 Cologne Centurions staff
Front office: General Manager – Jacques Orthen; Head coaches: Head Coach/Quarterbacks – Peter Vaas; Offensive coaches: Offensive Coordinator/Offensive Line – Bob Bicknell; National Coach/Running Backs/Special Teams – Marco Knorr; Wide Receivers – Dwaune Jones; Tight Ends/Assistant Offensive Line – Jay Hagood	Defensive coaches: Defensive Coordinator/Linebackers – David Duggan; Defensive Line – Tracy Simien; Defensive Backs – John Lyons; Defensive Assistant – Chris Ward; Strength and conditioning: Strength and Conditioning – Joe Shufelt

=== Roster ===
2005 Cologne Centurions final roster
Quarterbacks: 9 Chris Lewis; 16 Kevin Thompson; Running backs: 24 Kory Chapman; 26 Keylon Kincade; Wide receivers: 88 James Adkisson; 83 Romby Bryant; 87 Jamin Elliott; 80 C. J. Jones; 19 Carl Morris; 82 James Newson; Tight ends: 85 Dan Curley; 49 Hart Turner	Offensive linemen: 60 Steve Cully T; 68 Brandon Evans G; 66 Tam Hopkins G; 61 Jason Jimenez T; 65 Mike Mabry C; 67 Brent Swaggert G; 69 Zach Wilson T; Defensive linemen: 91 Delbert Cowsette DT; 92 Javor Mills DE; 93 Eric Powell DE; 98 Bryan Save DT; 99 Matt Walters DT; 95 Greg White DE	Linebackers: 55 Bobby Brooks OLB; 58 Anthony Dunn OLB; 50 Dave Moretti OLB; 56 Omar Nazel OLB; 57 Joe Tuipala MLB; Defensive backs: 10 Eddie Canonico FS; 29 Randee Drew CB; 33 Marcus Floyd CB; 32 Kevin House Jr. CB; 22 Kalvin Pearson SS; 21 Tyrone Sanders CB; 8 Lin-J Shell CB; 22 Art Smith CB; 23 Jamaine Winborne CB; Special teams: 18 Steve Baker P; 13 Jimmy Kibble K; 15 Cody Scates P	National players: 27 (Belgium) Loliki Bongo-Wanga RB; 38 (France) Philippe Gardent MLB; 35 (Germany) Leonard Greene SS; 86 (Germany) Werner Hippler TE; 1 (Japan) Yu Nakajima WR; 5 (Japan) Kentaro Namiki QB; 17 (Japan) Michihiro Ogawa WR; 28 (Japan) Kohei Satomi FS; Rookies in italics

== Schedule ==
Week	Date	Kickoff (Note: All times are in Central European Summer Time (CEST).)	Opponent	Results		Game site	Attendance
Week	Date	Kickoff	Opponent	Final score	Team record	Game site	Attendance
1	Saturday, April 2	6:00 p.m.	Hamburg Sea Devils	W 24–23	1–0	RheinEnergieStadion	9,468
2	Sunday, April 10	4:00 p.m.	at Rhein Fire	W 23–10	2–0	LTU arena	25,304
3	Saturday, April 16	6:00 p.m.	Frankfurt Galaxy	W 23–14	3–0	RheinEnergieStadion	10,821
4	Saturday, April 23	6:00 p.m.	Amsterdam Admirals	L 24–37	3–1	RheinEnergieStadion	8,863
5	Saturday, April 30	7:00 p.m.	at Hamburg Sea Devils	L 6–23	3–2	AOL Arena	15,228
6	Sunday, May 8	4:00 p.m.	Berlin Thunder	W 23–17	4–2	RheinEnergieStadion	9,485
7	Saturday, May 14	7:00 p.m.	at Frankfurt Galaxy	W 20–17 ^{OT}	5–2	Waldstadion	25,347
8	Monday, May 23	8:00 p.m.	at Amsterdam Admirals	L 12–30	5–3	Amsterdam ArenA	14,423
9	Sunday, May 29	4:00 p.m.	Rhein Fire	L 16–28	5–4	RheinEnergieStadion	32,521
10	Sunday, June 5	4:00 p.m.	at Berlin Thunder	W 17–13	6–4	Olympic Stadium	20,927

== Standings ==
NFL Europe League
Team	W	L	T	PCT	PF	PA	Home	Road	STK
Berlin Thunder	7	3	0	.700	241	191	4–1	3–2	L1
Amsterdam Admirals	6	4	0	.600	265	204	5–0	1–4	L1
Cologne Centurions	6	4	0	.600	188	212	3–2	3–2	W1
Hamburg Sea Devils	5	5	0	.500	213	196	4–1	1–4	W1
Frankfurt Galaxy	3	7	0	.300	163	246	2–3	1–4	L2
Rhein Fire	3	7	0	.300	203	224	2–3	1–4	W2

== Game summaries ==
=== Week 1: vs Hamburg Sea Devils ===
Week One: Hamburg Sea Devils at Cologne Centurions – Game summary

Quarter	1	2	3	4	Total
Hamburg	7	3	3	10	23
Cologne	7	7	3	7	24

at RheinEnergieStadion, Cologne, Germany

- Date: Saturday, April 2
- Game time: 6:06 p.m. CEST
- Game weather: 57 °F (13.9 °C), clear
- Game attendance: 9,468
- Referee: Gene Steratore

=== Week 2: at Rhein Fire ===
Week Two: Cologne Centurions at Rhein Fire – Game summary

Quarter	1	2	3	4	Total
Cologne	6	3	7	7	23
Rhein	0	3	0	7	10

at LTU arena, Düsseldorf, Germany

- Date: Sunday, April 10
- Game time: 4:04 p.m. CEST
- Game weather: 48 °F (8.9 °C), roof closed
- Game attendance: 25,304
- Referee: Jerome Boger

=== Week 3: vs Frankfurt Galaxy ===
Week Three: Frankfurt Galaxy at Cologne Centurions – Game summary

Quarter	1	2	3	4	Total
Frankfurt	7	7	0	0	14
Cologne	3	7	10	3	23

at RheinEnergieStadion, Cologne, Germany

- Date: Saturday, April 16
- Game time: 6:06 p.m. CEST
- Game weather: 50 °F (10.0 °C), cloudly
- Game attendance: 10,821
- Referee: Carl Cheffers

=== Week 4: vs Amsterdam Admirals ===
Week Four: Amsterdam Admirals at Cologne Centurions – Game summary

Quarter	1	2	3	4	Total
Amsterdam	7	20	7	3	37
Cologne	10	7	0	7	24

at RheinEnergieStadion, Cologne, Germany

- Date: Saturday, April 23
- Game time: 6:08 p.m. CEST
- Game weather: 59 °F (15.0 °C), cloudy
- Game attendance: 8,863
- Referee: Alberto Riveron

=== Week 5: at Hamburg Sea Devils ===
Week Five: Cologne Centurions at Hamburg Sea Devils – Game summary

Quarter	1	2	3	4	Total
Cologne	0	3	0	3	6
Hamburg	0	6	0	17	23

at AOL Arena, Hamburg, Germany

- Date: Saturday, April 30
- Game time: 7:05 p.m. CEST
- Game weather: 64 °F (17.8 °C), mostly cloudy
- Game attendance: 15,228
- Referee: Scott Green

=== Week 6: vs Berlin Thunder ===
Week Six: Berlin Thunder at Cologne Centurions – Game summary

Quarter	1	2	3	4	Total
Berlin	0	7	10	0	17
Cologne	10	0	0	13	23

at RheinEnergieStadion, Cologne, Germany

- Date: Sunday, May 8
- Game time: 4:06 p.m. CEST
- Game weather: 50 °F (10.0 °C), showers
- Game attendance: 9,485
- Referee: Gerald Austin

=== Week 7: at Frankfurt Galaxy ===
Week Seven: Cologne Centurions at Frankfurt Galaxy – Game summary

Quarter	1	2	3	4	OT	Total
Cologne	0	10	0	7	3	20
Frankfurt	7	7	0	3	0	17

at Waldstadion, Frankfurt, Germany

- Date: Saturday, May 14
- Game time: 7:07 p.m. CEST
- Game weather: 62 °F (16.7 °C), cloudy
- Game attendance: 25,347
- Referee: Walt Anderson

=== Week 8: at Amsterdam Admirals ===
Week Eight: Cologne Centurions at Amsterdam Admirals – Game summary

Quarter	1	2	3	4	Total
Cologne	6	6	0	0	12
Amsterdam	0	17	7	6	30

at Amsterdam ArenA, Amsterdam, Netherlands

- Date: Monday, May 23
- Game time: 8:17 p.m. CEST
- Game weather: 62 °F (16.8 °C), roof open, sunny
- Game attendance: 14,423
- Referee: Gene Steratore

=== Week 9: vs Rhein Fire ===
Week Nine: Rhein Fire at Cologne Centurions – Game summary

Quarter	1	2	3	4	Total
Rhein	0	14	7	7	28
Cologne	0	0	7	9	16

at RheinEnergieStadion, Cologne, Germany

- Date: Sunday, May 29
- Game time: 4:06 p.m. CEST
- Game weather: 72 °F (22.4 °C), mostly cloudy
- Game attendance: 32,521
- Referee: Walt Coleman

=== Week 10: at Berlin Thunder ===
Week Ten: Cologne Centurions Berlin Thunder – Game summary

Quarter	1	2	3	4	Total
Cologne	3	0	7	7	17
Berlin	3	7	3	0	13

at Olympic Stadium, Berlin, Germany

- Date: Sunday, June 5
- Game time: 4:05 p.m. CEST
- Game weather: 65 °F (18.3 °C), cloudy
- Game attendance: 20,927
- Referee: Carl Cheffers
