= Anthony Oakley =

American football player (born 1981)

No. 68, 62
- Position: Guard

Personal information
- Born: August 16, 1981 (age 45); Houston, Texas, U.S.
- Listed height: 6 ft 4 in (1.93 m)
- Listed weight: 298 lb (135 kg)

Career information
- High school: Westbury (Houston)
- College: Western Kentucky
- NFL draft: 2004: undrafted

Career history
- Cleveland Browns (2004)*; Frankfurt Galaxy (2005); Chicago Bears (2005–2007); Arizona Cardinals (2008)*; Kansas City Chiefs (2008)*; Houston Texans (2008)*; Las Vegas Locomotives (2010)
- * Offseason or practice squad member only

Awards and highlights
- GFC All-Newcomer Team (2003); UFL champion (2010)

Career NFL statistics
- Games played: 3
- Stats at Pro Football Reference

Anthony Oakley (born August 16, 1981) is an American former professional football player who was a guard in the National Football League (NFL). He played college football for the Western Kentucky Hilltoppers and was signed by the Cleveland Browns as an undrafted free agent in 2004.

Oakley was also a member of the Frankfurt Galaxy, Chicago Bears, Arizona Cardinals, Kansas City Chiefs, Houston Texans, and Las Vegas Locomotives.
