= Michael Brown (linebacker) =

American football player (born 1980)

No. 57, 30
- Position: Linebacker

Personal information
- Born: January 16, 1980 (age 46); Louisville, Kentucky, U.S.
- Listed height: 5 ft 10 in (1.78 m)
- Listed weight: 220 lb (100 kg)

Career information
- High school: Butler (Louisville)
- College: Louisville
- NFL draft: 2003: undrafted

Career history
- Tampa Bay Buccaneers (2003)*; Washington Redskins (2004); Atlanta Falcons (2005)*; → Berlin Thunder (2005); New York Jets (2006)*
- * Offseason or practice squad member only
- Stats at Pro Football Reference

Michael Eric Brown (born January 16, 1980) is an American former professional football linebacker who played for the Washington Redskins of the National Football League (NFL). He played college football for the Louisville Cardinals.

== Early life ==
Michael Eric Brown was born on January 16, 1980, in Louisville, Kentucky. He played high school football at Butler Traditional High School in Louisville as a running back. He rushed 288 times for 2,069 yards as a senior in 1998, earning All-State honors.

== College career ==
Brown enrolled at the University of Louisville to play college football for the Cardinals. He was a four-year letterman at linebacker 1999 to 2002. As a freshman in 1999, he recorded 104 tackles (second best on the team), one interception return for a touchdown, three forced fumbles, and one fumble recovery, garnering Conference USA all-freshman and The Sporting News second-team freshman All-American recognition. On December 6, 2000, Brown was one of five Louisville football players arrested following a fraternity party fight at a nigh club. He recorded college career totals of six interceptions for 134 yards and one touchdown, one fumble recovery for an 81-yard touchdown, eight kick returns for 142 yards, and one reception for five yards.

== Professional career ==
After going undrafted in the 2003 NFL draft, Brown signed with the Tampa Bay Buccaneers on May 5, 2003. He was waived on August 29 but later signed to the practice squad on December 16. He signed a reserve/future contract with the Buccaneers on December 29, 2003. Brown was waived on September 5, 2004, before the start of the 2004 regular season.

Brown signed with the Washington Redskins on September 21, 2004. The Redskins waived linebacker Devin Lemons to make room for Brown on the active roster. Brown played in two games for the Redskins in a reserve role before being waived on October 5, 2004.

On January 31, 2005, the Atlanta Falcons signed Brown to a reserve/future contract. He was allocated to NFL Europe to play for the Berlin Thunder. He played in all ten games, starting nine, for the Thunder during the 2005 NFL Europe season, posting 37 defensive tackles, four special teams tackles, two sacks, one interception, seven pass breakups, and one fumble recovery. The Thunder finished the year with a 7–3 record and lost in World Bowl XIII to the Amsterdam Admirals by a score of 27–21. Brown was released by the Falcons on September 3, 2005, before the start of the NFL regular season.

Browns was signed by the New York Jets on May 12, 2006, but released on June 14, 2006.
