= Dan Curley =

American football player (born 1978)

No. 44, 85
- Positions: Fullback, tight end

Personal information
- Born: April 25, 1978 (age 48); Tacoma, Washington, U.S.
- Listed height: 6 ft 4 in (1.93 m)
- Listed weight: 254 lb (115 kg)

Career information
- High school: Anacortes (WA)
- College: Eastern Washington
- NFL draft: 2003: 5th round, 148th overall pick

Career history
- St. Louis Rams (2003); New Orleans Saints (2004)*; Carolina Panthers (2005)*; → Cologne Centurions (2005)
- * Offseason or practice squad member only
- Stats at Pro Football Reference

Daniel Lawrence Curley (born April 25, 1979) is an American former professional football player who was a fullback and tight end in the National Football League (NFL). He was selected by the St. Louis Rams in the fifth round of the 2003 NFL draft. He played college football at Eastern Washington.

Curley was also a member of the New Orleans Saints, Carolina Panthers and Cologne Centurions.

== Early life ==
Curley played high school football at Anacortes High School in Anacortes, Washington.

== College career ==
Curley played college football at Eastern Washington. He was a one-time All-American during his time at Eastern Washington and also earned first-team All-Big Sky Conference honors once. In 2021, he was one of five tight ends named to the 2000-2009 Eastern Washington All-Decade Team.

== Professional career ==
Pre-draft measurables
Height	Weight	40-yard dash	10-yard split	20-yard split	20-yard shuttle	Three-cone drill	Vertical jump	Broad jump	Bench press	Wonderlic
6 ft 4 in (1.93 m)	254 lb (115 kg)	4.63 s	1.58 s	2.73 s	4.53 s	7.47 s	35 1/2 in (0.90 m)	9 ft 10 in (3.00 m)	17 reps	28
All from NFL Combine.

Curley was selected by the St. Louis Rams in the fifth round, with the 148th overall pick, of the 2003 NFL draft. He officially signed with the team on July 22, 2003. He played in one game for the Rams during the 2003 season before being waived on October 9, 2003.

Curley signed a reserve/future contract with the New Orleans Saints on January 6, 2004. He was waived on September 5, 2004.

Curley signed a reserve/future contract with the Carolina Panthers on January 4, 2005. He was allocated to NFL Europe and played in three games, starting one, for the Cologne Centurions during the 2005 NFL Europe season. He was waived by the Panthers on September 3, 2005.
