= Andy King (American football) =

American football player (born 1978)

No. 68, 65
- Position: Offensive guard

Personal information
- Born: November 9, 1978 (age 47); Lincoln, Illinois, U.S.
- Listed height: 6 ft 4 in (1.93 m)
- Listed weight: 310 lb (141 kg)

Career information
- High school: Lincoln
- College: Illinois State
- NFL draft: 2002: undrafted

Career history
- St. Louis Rams (2002–2003); Seattle Seahawks (2005)*; Amsterdam Admirals (2005)
- * Offseason or practice squad member only

Career NFL statistics
- Games: 6
- Stats at Pro Football Reference

Andrew Joel King (born November 9, 1978) is an American former professional football player who was an offensive guard in the National Football League (NFL). He played for the St. Louis Rams from 2002 to 2003. He played college football for the Illinois State Redbirds.
