= Polytechnic High School (Fort Worth, Texas) =

Location
- 1300 Conner Ave. Fort Worth, TX 76105; United States
- Coordinates: 32.73161°N 97.28791°W

Information
- Type: Public, Secondary
- School district: Fort Worth Independent School District
- Teaching staff: 87.91 (FTE)
- Enrollment: 1,277 (2023-24)
- Student to teacher ratio: 13.75
- Color(s): Orange and black
- Mascot: Poly the Parrot, Paris the Parrot
- Nickname: Parrots
- Rival: Eastern Hills High School
- Website: www.fwisd.org/Polytechnic

Polytechnic High School, also known colloquially as "Poly", is a public high school located in Fort Worth, Texas, United States.

== History ==
The Polytechnic Heights community originally grew around the Manchester Cotton Mill and merged with the city of Fort Worth in 1922. The first school associated with the Manchester community was formed in 1886 and replaced by a new, expanded Polytechnic Heights School in 1907. The class of 1912, Polytechnic's first graduating class, had just eleven students. In 1923, now part of the Fort Worth Public Schools, Polytechnic moved to an even larger building at 1202 Nashville Street, and the old building became an elementary school. In 1938, Poly moved two blocks away to its current building, which was designed by renowned local architect, Joseph Pelich.

== Notable alumni ==
- Kenneth Copeland (b. 1936) — televangelist, author, and head of Kenneth Copeland Ministries
- Thomas Herrion (1981-2005) — former American football player
- Hugh Parmer (1939-2020) — former mayor of Fort Worth and former member of both houses of the Texas State Legislature
- Johnny Vaught (1909–2006) — football coach at the University of Mississippi (Ole Miss), College Football Hall of Fame (1979); namesake of Vaught–Hemingway Stadium
- Tamron Hall - journalist and talk show host based in New York City.
