= Scott Connot =

American football player (born 1981)

No. 41, 23
- Position: Defensive back

Personal information
- Born: June 24, 1981 (age 45); Spencer, Nebraska, U.S.
- Listed height: 6 ft 3 in (1.91 m)
- Listed weight: 216 lb (98 kg)

Career information
- High school: Spencer/Naper High School
- College: South Dakota State (1999–2003)
- NFL draft: 2004: undrafted

Career history
- Kansas City Chiefs (2004–2006); → Amsterdam Admirals (2005)

Awards and highlights
- World Bowl champion (XIII); All-NFL Europe (2005); First-team All-NCC (2003)

Career NFL statistics
- Games played: 2
- Tackles: 1
- Stats at Pro Football Reference

Scott Paul Connot (born June 24, 1981) is an American former professional football defensive back who played in the National Football League (NFL) with the Kansas City Chiefs and in NFL Europe with the Amsterdam Admirals. He played college football for the South Dakota State Jackrabbits.

== Early life ==
Connot was born on June 24, 1981, in Spencer, Nebraska. He attended Spencer/Naper High School in Spencer.

== College career ==
Connot played college football for the South Dakota State Jackrabbits from 1999 to 2003. He redshirted his first year and was a three-year letterman from 2001 to 2003. In 2003, Connot was named to the All-NCC first-team.

== Professional career ==
=== Kansas City Chiefs ===
After not being selected in the 2004 NFL draft, Connot signed with the Kansas City Chiefs of the National Football League (NFL) as an undrafted free agent. He was waived by the team on September 5, 2004, and signed to the practice squad on September 16. On December 9, Connot was promoted to the active roster and signed a three-year contract with Kansas City. He made his NFL debut against the Tennessee Titans and made one tackle on special teams. Connot played in the Week 17 game against the San Diego Chargers but did not record any statistics.

On September 3, 2005, Connot was released by the team. On September 5, he was signed to the practice squad, where he spent the rest of the season. On January 3, 2006, Connot signed a reserve/ future contract with the Chiefs. On September 2, he was released by the team.

=== Amsterdam Admirals ===
On February 1, 2005, Connot was assigned to the Amsterdam Admirals of NFL Europe. He played and started in all ten games, making 73 tackles, two forced fumbles, ten pass breakups and four interceptions. Connot was named to the All-NFL Europe team and was World Bowl XIII champion.
