= Ken Schrom =

American baseball player (born 1954)

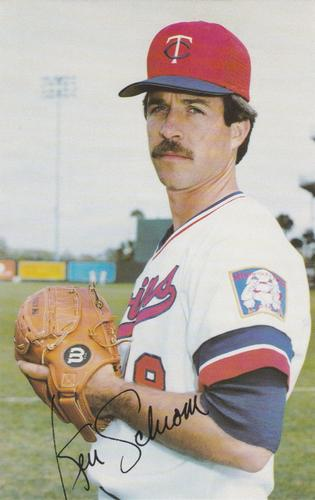
- Pitcher
- Born: November 23, 1954 (age 71); Grangeville, Idaho, U.S.
- Batted: Right Threw: Right

MLB debut
- August 8, 1980, for the Toronto Blue Jays

Last MLB appearance
- October 3, 1987, for the Cleveland Indians

MLB statistics
- Win–loss record: 51–51
- Earned run average: 4.81
- Strikeouts: 372
- Stats at Baseball Reference

Teams
- Toronto Blue Jays (1980, 1982); Minnesota Twins (1983–1985); Cleveland Indians (1986–1987)

Career highlights and awards
- All-Star (1986)

Kenneth Marvin Schrom (born November 23, 1954) is an American former Major League Baseball pitcher and current minor league executive.

Selected in the 17th round of the 1976 MLB amateur draft by the California Angels, Schrom pitched for seven seasons in the majors (1980, 1982–1987), for the Toronto Blue Jays, Minnesota Twins (1983–85), and Cleveland Indians (1986–87) of the American League. While with Cleveland, he was selected for the American League All-Star team in 1986, but did not play.

During his major league career, Schrom appeared in 176 games with 137 starts and 22 complete games, throwing 900 innings. His record was 51–51 with an ERA of 4.81. His playing career ended in the spring of 1989 with a shoulder injury. Schrom remained in baseball, serving in the front office of several minor league clubs. He spent over fifteen years with the El Paso Diablos, a team he had played with in the late 1970s.

Schrom is currently the president of the Corpus Christi Hooks of the Texas League, the AA affiliate of the Houston Astros.

== High school and college ==
Born and raised in Grangeville, Idaho, Schrom graduated from Grangeville High School in 1973, where he won 11 athletic letters and was an all-state selection in football, basketball, and baseball. Selected in the tenth round of the 1973 MLB amateur draft by the Minnesota Twins, the right-hander opted for college and accepted a scholarship to the University of Idaho in Moscow to pitch for the Vandals in baseball and play quarterback on the football team.

Schrom was the back-up QB as a redshirt sophomore in 1975, coached by offensive coordinator Dennis Erickson under head coach Ed Troxel. An excellent pure passer, he had to forego spring football practice to play baseball. At the time, Idaho ran the veer, an option offense which exposed the quarterback to continual contact with the defense. After hurting his left (non-throwing) shoulder in football, Schrom did not want to hurt his right and turned pro after his junior year of baseball (spring 1976). He is a member of the Delta Sigma Phi fraternity.

Schrom completed his degree in education in increments during the baseball off-season and graduated in 1980.
