= Jason Rader =

American football player (born 1981)

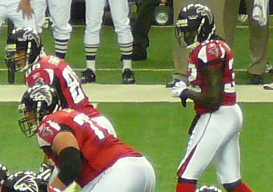
- Rader with Tyson Clabo and Jerious Norwood

No. 85
- Position: Tight end

Personal information
- Born: April 12, 1981 (age 45); Charleston, West Virginia, U.S.
- Listed height: 6 ft 4 in (1.93 m)
- Listed weight: 260 lb (118 kg)

Career information
- High school: Saint Albans (St. Albans, West Virginia)
- College: Georgia (1999–2000); Marshall (2001–2003)
- NFL draft: 2004: undrafted

Career history
- Atlanta Falcons (2004)*; Rhein Fire (2005); Miami Dolphins (2005–2006); New England Patriots (2007)*; Atlanta Falcons (2008–2009)
- * Offseason or practice squad member only

Career NFL statistics
- Receptions: 1
- Receiving yards: 26
- Stats at Pro Football Reference

Jason Randolph Rader (born April 12, 1981) is an American former professional football player who was a tight end in the National Football League (NFL). He was signed by the Atlanta Falcons as an undrafted free agent in 2004. He played college football for the Marshall Thundering Herd.

Rader was also a member of the Rhein Fire, Miami Dolphins, and New England Patriots.

== Early life ==
Rader attended high school at St. Albans High School in St. Albans, West Virginia. He signed with coach Jim Donnan in 1999 at the University of Georgia, and caught two passes for 31 yards in the 2000 season. Rader transferred to Marshall University, sitting out in 2001. In 2002–03, he caught 30 passes each year, piling up 553 yards and 5 touchdowns, helping the Herd to an upset of No. 6 Kansas State as a senior in 2003 and finished with an 8–4 season. In 2002, he caught 30 passes from Byron Leftwich and Stan Hill in leading the Herd to the Mid-American Conference title and a GMAC Bowl win over Louisville, 38–15, in Mobile, Ala. as Marshall finished 11-2 that season.

== Professional career ==
=== First stint with Falcons ===
Rader was signed as an undrafted free agent by the Atlanta Falcons, but was released at the conclusion of training camp. He had a workout for the San Francisco 49ers in October but spent the year out of football.

=== Miami Dolphins ===
In the spring, Rader played with the Rhein Fire of NFL Europa, catching 21 passes for 189 yards. In June, he signed a two-year deal with the Miami Dolphins. Though he was released at the end of training camp, he spent the final eight games of the season on the team's practice squad.

Rader was re-signed by the team in January 2006. He was waived the following September, but re-signed to the practice squad. A few weeks later on September 16, Rader was signed to the Dolphins' active roster. He played five games (including one start) and accumulated no statistics before being released on November 8.

The Dolphins signed Rader to a future contract in January. He was released on August 27.

=== New England Patriots ===
Rader was signed to the Patriots' practice squad on September 3 after a tryout with the team on August 31.

He was released in late September.

=== Second stint with Atlanta ===
On March 14, 2008, Rader re-signed with the Atlanta Falcons after last playing with the team in the 2004 preseason. He was released by the team during final cuts on August 30, but re-signed on September 17 after the team waived tight end Martrez Milner.

Rader remained with the Falcons until October 29, when he was released to make room for re-signed offensive tackle Wayne Gandy. Rader had appeared in six games for the Falcons, catching one pass. Rader re-signed with the Falcons on December 8.

On April 24, 2010, Rader announced that he was retiring.
