= 2005 Berlin Thunder season =

NFL Europe team season

- General manager: Michael Lang
- Head coach: Rick Lantz
- Home stadium: Olympic Stadium

Results
- Record: 7–3
- Division place: 1st
- Playoffs: Lost World Bowl XIII

The 2005 Berlin Thunder season was the seventh season for the franchise in the NFL Europe League (NFLEL). The team was led by head coach Rick Lantz in his second year, and played its home games at Olympic Stadium in Berlin, Germany. They finished the regular season in first place with a record of seven wins and three losses. In World Bowl XIII, Berlin lost to the Amsterdam Admirals 27–21.

== Offseason ==
=== Free agent draft ===
2005 Berlin Thunder NFLEL free agent draft selections
| Draft order | | Player name | Position | College |
| Round | Choice | Player name | Position | College |
|---|---|---|---|---|
| 1 | 6 | DeAngelo Lloyd | DE | Tennessee |
| 2 | 12 | Darrell Lee | DE | Florida |
| 3 | 13 | Dante Ellington | T | Alabama |
| 4 | 24 | James Thornton | CB | Morris Brown |
| 5 | 25 | David Porter | T | Iowa |
| 6 | 36 | Greg Taplin | DE | Michigan State |
| 7 | 37 | Regis Crawford | C | Arizona State |
| 8 | 45 | Reggie Rhodes | DT | Valdosta State |

== Personnel ==
=== Staff ===
2005 Berlin Thunder staff
| Front office: General Manager – Michael Lang; Head coaches: Head Coach – Rick Lantz; Offensive coaches: Offensive Coordinator/Offensive Line – Don Eck; Quarterbacks/Wide Receivers – Steve Logan; National Coach/Running Backs – Wanja Müller; Offensive Line/Tight Ends – Reggie McElroy | Defensive coaches: Defensive Coordinator – Jim Tomsula; Defensive Line – D'Marco Farr; Linebackers – Kurt Gouveia; Defensive Backs – Cris Dishman; Strength and conditioning: Strength and Conditioning – Martin Streight |

=== Roster ===
2005 Berlin Thunder final roster
| Quarterbacks: 8 Bret Engemann; 9 Chris Finlen; 15 Dave Ragone; Running backs: 24 Little John Flowers; 45 Brian Johnson; 46 Ben Moa; 23 Cal Murray; Wide receivers: 13 Aaron Boone; 86 Michael Jennings; 80 Robert Redd; 81 Terrence Stubbs; Tight ends: 85 John Frieser; 88 Joel Jacobs | Offensive linemen: 69 Ben Claxton C; 65 Regis Crawford G/C; 79 Dante Ellington G; 72 Tony Pape T; 73 David Porter T; 71 Shaun Rose T; 75 Shannon Snell G; Defensive linemen: 94 Charles Hill DT; 93 Isaac Hilton DE; 98 Darrell Lee DT; 90 DeAngelo Lloyd DE; 96 Reggie Rhodes DT; 91 Greg Taplin DE | Linebackers: 55 Jamal Brooks OLB; 30 Michael Brown OLB; 57 Rich Scanlon MLB; 53 Andre Sommersell MLB; 54 Winston Taylor OLB; Defensive backs: 33 Daryl Dixon FS; 22 Willie Ford CB; 36 Michael Harden CB; 43 Jack Hunt FS; 20 Adrian Mayes SS; 21 Jermaine Mays CB; 26 James Thornton FS/CB; Special teams: 10 Kevin Miller K; 1 Brian Simnjanovski P | National players: 89 (Finland) Klaus Alinen TE; 28 (England) Neil Baxter RB; 29 (Germany) Oliver Flemming SS; 66 (Japan) Masakazu Goda C; 38 (Russia) Sergey Ivanov SS; 84 (Mexico) Hugo Lira WR; 27 (France) Laurent Marceline RB; 99 (England) Lorn Mayers DT; 92 (Germany) Christian Mohr DE; 52 (France) Nick Prevost OLB; 97 (England) Daniel Watts DE/DT; Rookies in italics |

== Schedule ==
| Week | Date | Kickoff (Note: All times are in Central European Summer Time (CEST).) | Opponent | Results | | Game site | Attendance |
| Week | Date | Kickoff | Opponent | Final score | Team record | Game site | Attendance |
|---|---|---|---|---|---|---|---|
| 1 | Saturday, April 2 | 6:00 p.m. | Frankfurt Galaxy | W 30–7 | 1–0 | Olympic Stadium | 16,199 |
| 2 | Sunday, April 10 | 4:00 p.m. | Hamburg Sea Devils | W 15–13 | 2–0 | Olympic Stadium | 14,312 |
| 3 | Saturday, April 16 | 7:00 p.m. | at Amsterdam Admirals | L 27–31 | 2–1 | Amsterdam ArenA | 10,131 |
| 4 | Saturday, April 23 | 7:00 p.m. | at Rhein Fire | W 30–28 | 3–1 | LTU arena | 20,399 |
| 5 | Saturday, April 30 | 6:00 p.m. | Amsterdam Admirals | W 27–16 | 4–1 | Olympic Stadium | 16,109 |
| 6 | Sunday, May 8 | 4:00 p.m. | at Cologne Centurions | L 17–23 | 4–2 | RheinEnergieStadion | 9,485 |
| 7 | Saturday, May 14 | 6:00 p.m. | Rhein Fire | W 24–15 | 5–2 | Olympic Stadium | 16,695 |
| 8 | Sunday, May 22 | 4:00 p.m. | at Hamburg Sea Devils | W 27–17 | 6–2 | AOL Arena | 16,889 |
| 9 | Saturday, May 28 | 7:00 p.m. | at Frankfurt Galaxy | W 31–24 | 7–2 | Waldstadion | 40,109 |
| 10 | Sunday, June 5 | 4:00 p.m. | Cologne Centurions | L 13–17 | 7–3 | Olympic Stadium | 20,927 |
World Bowl XIII
| 11 | Saturday, June 11 | 5:00 p.m. | Amsterdam Admirals | L 21–27 | 7–4 | LTU arena | 35,134 |

== Standings ==
NFL Europe League
| Team | W | L | T | PCT | PF | PA | Home | Road | STK |
|---|---|---|---|---|---|---|---|---|---|
| Berlin Thunder | 7 | 3 | 0 | .700 | 241 | 191 | 4–1 | 3–2 | L1 |
| Amsterdam Admirals | 6 | 4 | 0 | .600 | 265 | 204 | 5–0 | 1–4 | L1 |
| Cologne Centurions | 6 | 4 | 0 | .600 | 188 | 212 | 3–2 | 3–2 | W1 |
| Hamburg Sea Devils | 5 | 5 | 0 | .500 | 213 | 196 | 4–1 | 1–4 | W1 |
| Frankfurt Galaxy | 3 | 7 | 0 | .300 | 163 | 246 | 2–3 | 1–4 | L2 |
| Rhein Fire | 3 | 7 | 0 | .300 | 203 | 224 | 2–3 | 1–4 | W2 |

== Game summaries ==
=== Week 1: vs Frankfurt Galaxy ===
Week One: Frankfurt Galaxy at Berlin Thunder – Game summary

| Quarter | 1 | 2 | 3 | 4 | Total |
|---|---|---|---|---|---|
| Frankfurt | 0 | 0 | 0 | 7 | 7 |
| Berlin | 3 | 14 | 3 | 10 | 30 |

at Olympic Stadium, Berlin, Germany

- Date: Saturday, April 2
- Game time: 6:00 p.m. CEST
- Game weather: 60 °F (15.6 °C)
- Game attendance: 16,199
- Referee: Jerome Boger

=== Week 2: vs Hamburg Sea Devils ===
Week Two: Hamburg Sea Devils at Berlin Thunder – Game summary

| Quarter | 1 | 2 | 3 | 4 | Total |
|---|---|---|---|---|---|
| Hamburg | 3 | 3 | 0 | 7 | 13 |
| Berlin | 5 | 0 | 7 | 3 | 15 |

at Olympic Stadium, Berlin, Germany

- Date: Sunday, April 10
- Game time: 4:04 p.m. CEST
- Game weather: 46 °F (7.8 °C), cloudy
- Game attendance: 14,312
- Referee: Walt Anderson

=== Week 3: at Amsterdam Admirals ===
Week Three: Berlin Thunder at Amsterdam Admirals – Game summary

| Quarter | 1 | 2 | 3 | 4 | Total |
|---|---|---|---|---|---|
| Berlin | 3 | 3 | 7 | 14 | 27 |
| Amsterdam | 0 | 3 | 14 | 14 | 31 |

at Amsterdam ArenA, Amsterdam, Netherlands

- Date: Saturday, April 16
- Game time: 7:07 p.m. CEST
- Game weather: 62 °F (16.7 °C), roof closed
- Game attendance: 10,131
- Referee: John Parry

=== Week 4: at Rhein Fire ===
Week Four: Berlin Thunder at Rhein Fire – Game summary

| Quarter | 1 | 2 | 3 | 4 | Total |
|---|---|---|---|---|---|
| Berlin | 7 | 7 | 0 | 16 | 30 |
| Rhein | 7 | 7 | 7 | 7 | 28 |

at LTU arena, Düsseldorf, Germany

- Date: Saturday, April 23
- Game time: 7:04 p.m. CEST
- Game weather: 58 °F (14.4 °C), roof open, sunny with clouds
- Game attendance: 20,399
- Referee: Carl Cheffers

=== Week 5: vs Amsterdam Admirals ===
Week Five: Amsterdam Admirals at Berlin Thunder – Game summary

| Quarter | 1 | 2 | 3 | 4 | Total |
|---|---|---|---|---|---|
| Amsterdam | 3 | 7 | 3 | 3 | 16 |
| Berlin | 7 | 3 | 7 | 10 | 27 |

at Olympic Stadium, Berlin, Germany

- Date: Saturday, April 30
- Game time: 6:05 p.m. CEST
- Game weather: 72 °F (22.2 °C), cloudy
- Game attendance: 16,109
- Referee: Craig Wrolstad

=== Week 6: at Cologne Centurions ===
Week Six: Berlin Thunder at Cologne Centurions – Game summary

| Quarter | 1 | 2 | 3 | 4 | Total |
|---|---|---|---|---|---|
| Berlin | 0 | 7 | 10 | 0 | 17 |
| Cologne | 10 | 0 | 0 | 13 | 23 |

at RheinEnergieStadion, Cologne, Germany

- Date: Sunday, May 8
- Game time: 4:06 p.m. CEST
- Game weather: 50 °F (10.0 °C), showers
- Game attendance: 9,485
- Referee: Gerald Austin

=== Week 7: vs Rhein Fire ===
Week Seven: Rhein Fire at Berlin Thunder – Game summary

| Quarter | 1 | 2 | 3 | 4 | Total |
|---|---|---|---|---|---|
| Rhein | 0 | 12 | 3 | 0 | 15 |
| Berlin | 0 | 10 | 7 | 7 | 24 |

at Olympic Stadium, Berlin, Germany

- Date: Saturday, May 14
- Game time: 6:05 p.m. CEST
- Game weather: 57 °F (14 °C), cloudy with rain
- Game attendance: 16,695
- Referee: Gene Steratore

=== Week 8: at Hamburg Sea Devils ===
Week Eight: Berlin Thunder at Hamburg Sea Devils – Game summary

| Quarter | 1 | 2 | 3 | 4 | Total |
|---|---|---|---|---|---|
| Berlin | 7 | 7 | 7 | 6 | 27 |
| Hamburg | 7 | 7 | 3 | 0 | 17 |

at AOL Arena, Hamburg, Germany

- Date: Sunday, May 22
- Game time: 4:05 p.m. CEST
- Game weather: 70 °F (21.1 °C), sunny
- Game attendance: 16,889
- Referee: Walt Anderson

=== Week 9: at Frankfurt Galaxy ===
Week Nine: Berlin Thunder at Frankfurt Galaxy – Game summary

| Quarter | 1 | 2 | 3 | 4 | Total |
|---|---|---|---|---|---|
| Berlin | 7 | 7 | 3 | 14 | 31 |
| Frankfurt | 7 | 14 | 0 | 3 | 24 |

at Waldstadion, Frankfurt, Germany

- Date: Saturday, May 28
- Game time: 7:07 p.m. CEST
- Game weather: 87 °F (30.6 °C), sunny
- Game attendance: 40,109
- Referee: Jerome Boger

=== Week 10: vs Cologne Centurions ===
Week Ten: Cologne Centurions Berlin Thunder – Game summary

| Quarter | 1 | 2 | 3 | 4 | Total |
|---|---|---|---|---|---|
| Cologne | 3 | 0 | 7 | 7 | 17 |
| Berlin | 3 | 7 | 3 | 0 | 13 |

at Olympic Stadium, Berlin, Germany

- Date: Sunday, June 5
- Game time: 4:05 p.m. CEST
- Game weather: 65 °F (18.3 °C), cloudy
- Game attendance: 20,927
- Referee: Carl Cheffers

=== World Bowl XIII ===
World Bowl XIII: Amsterdam Admirals vs Berlin Thunder – Game summary

| Quarter | 1 | 2 | 3 | 4 | Total |
|---|---|---|---|---|---|
| Amsterdam | 7 | 10 | 7 | 3 | 27 |
| Berlin | 0 | 7 | 0 | 14 | 21 |

at LTU arena, Düsseldorf, Germany

- Date: Saturday, June 11
- Game time: 5:05 p.m. CEST
- Game weather: 57 °F (13.9 °C), roof closed
- Game attendance: 35,134
- Referee: Scott Green
- TV announcers (FOX): Curt Menefee and Brian Baldinger
