= Clarence LeBlanc (American football) =

American football player (born 1977)

No. 35
- Position: Safety

Personal information
- Born: March 26, 1977 (age 49); River Ridge, Louisiana, U.S.
- Listed height: 6 ft 3 in (1.91 m)
- Listed weight: 210 lb (95 kg)

Career information
- High school: John Curtis Christian (River Ridge)
- College: LSU (1996–1999)
- NFL draft: 2001: undrafted

Career history
- New York Giants (2001)*; → Rhein Fire (2001); New York Jets (2001)*; New York Giants (2001–2004); Rhein Fire (2005)
- * Offseason or practice squad member only

Awards and highlights
- All-NFL Europe (2001)

Career NFL statistics
- Games played: 4
- Tackles: 2
- Stats at Pro Football Reference

Clarence J. LeBlanc (born March 26, 1977) is an American former professional football safety who played in the National Football League (NFL) for the New York Giants. He played college football for the LSU Tigers.

== Early life ==
LeBlanc was born on March 26, 1977, in River Ridge, Louisiana. He attended John Curtis Christian School in River Ridge where he played football, basketball, baseball and track.

== College career ==
LeBlanc played college football for the LSU Tigers from 1996 to 1999 and was a four-year letterman. He was a three-year starter, recording 207 tackles, two, sacks, 13 pass break ups and seven interceptions, including one for a touchdown. On November 3, 1999, LeBlanc was ruled ineligible for the final three games after alleged inappropriate contact with a sports agent.

== Professional career ==
=== New York Giants (first stint) ===
After going undrafted in the 2001 NFL draft, LeBlanc signed with the New York Giants as an undrafted free agent. On September 3, he was released and signed to the practice squad. On October 2, LeBlanc was elevated to the active roster. On October 25, he was waived, without appearing in any games for the team.

=== Rhein Fire (first stint) ===
On February 16, 2001, LeBlanc was allocated to the Rhein Fire of NFL Europe. He had 39 tackles, six break ups, 4 interceptions, including three pick-sixes with two in one game.

=== New York Jets ===
On October 26, 2001, Leblanc was claimed off waivers by the New York Jets. On December 29, he was released by the team.

=== New York Giants (second stint) ===
On December 31, 2001, the New York Giants claimed LeBlanc off waivers. On August 26, 2002, he was placed on the injured reserve. On September 1, 2003 LeBlanc was released by the team. On November 19, he was elevated to the active roster. LeBlanc played in four games, recording two tackles on special teams. On March 16, 2004, he was re-signed by the Giants. On May 20, LeBlanc was released.

=== Rhein Fire (second stint) ===
On February 14, 2005, the Rhein Fire selected LeBlanc in the 2005 NFL Europe free agent draft. He played in two games at safety.
