= 2005 Frankfurt Galaxy season =

NFL Europe team season

- General manager: Tilman Engel
- Head coach: Mike Jones
- Home stadium: Waldstadion

Results
- Record: 3–7
- Division place: 5th
- Playoffs: Did not qualify

The 2005 Frankfurt Galaxy season was the 13th season for the franchise in the NFL Europe League (NFLEL). The team was led by head coach Mike Jones in his second year, and played its home games at Waldstadion in Frankfurt, Germany. They finished the regular season in fifth place with a record of three wins and seven losses.

== Offseason ==
=== Free agent draft ===
2005 Frankfurt Galaxy NFLEL free agent draft selections
Draft order		Player name	Position	College
Round	Choice	Player name	Position	College
1	5	Brock Edwards	TE	Texas
2	11	Michael Landry	DT	Southern
3	14	Ronald Jones	DE	Southern Mississippi
4	23	William Henry	T	Clemson
5	26	Jon Pendergrass	CB	Southern Illinois
6	35	Alex Nguae	LB	Washington State
7	38	Doug Goodwin	DT	Boston College
8	44	Anthony Oakley	G	Western Kentucky

== Personnel ==
=== Staff ===
2005 Frankfurt Galaxy (NFL Europe) staff
Front office: General Manager – Tilman Engel; Head coaches: Head Coach – Mike Jones; Offensive coaches: Offensive Coordinator/Offensive Line – Whitey Jordan; Quarterbacks – Alex Van Pelt; Running Backs – Steve Smith; Wide Receivers – Milton Wynn; National Coach/Tight Ends – Markus Grahn	Defensive coaches: Defensive Coordinator/Linebackers – Ed O'Neil; Defensive Line – Richard Wood; Defensive Backs/Special Teams – Ken Stills; Assistant Defensive Backs – James Rooths; Strength and conditioning: Strength and Conditioning – George Bardis

=== Roster ===
2005 Frankfurt Galaxy final roster
Quarterbacks: 9 Kevin Eakin; 11 Akili Smith; 2 B. J. Symons; Running backs: 29 Ahmaad Galloway; 33 J. R. Niklos; Wide receivers: 86 Sam Breeden; 89 Aaron Hosack; 81 Jamal Jones; 84 Kelvin Kight; 83 Sam Simmons; 18 Chris Vance; 16 LaDaris Vann; 80 Huey Whittaker; Tight ends: 88 Mark Anelli; 87 Brock Edwards	Offensive linemen: 75 Sterling Harris T; 73 William Henry T; 60 Aaron Johnson C/T; 52 Ben Nowland C; 77 Anthony Oakley G; 63 Jeremy Phillips G; 79 Isaiah Ross G; 68 Joe Tate C/G; 65 Cliff Washburn T; Defensive linemen: 97 Ahmad Childress DT; 98 Derrick Crawford DE; 92 Louis Gachelin DT; 96 Daemeon Grier DT; 93 Cedric Hilliard DT (IR); 99 Matt Mitrione DT; 94 Seante Williams DE	Linebackers: 50 Kellen Brantley MLB; 57 Kevin DeRonde OLB; 42 Matt Farrior OLB; 58 Howard Hodges OLB; 43 Maurice Jones OLB; 59 Alex Ngaue MLB; 51 Grant Steen OLB; Defensive backs: 23 James Bethea CB; 21 Lamont Brightful CB; 35 Woody Dantzler SS; 40 Michael Grant SS; 27 Eric Joyce CB; 30 Janssen Patton FS; 26 Jon Pendergrass CB; 35 Ray Perryman FS; Special teams: 7 Mike Barr P; 5 Owen Pochman K; 10 Stephen Scaldaferri K	National players: 76 (Norway) Anders Akerstrom DE; 85 (England) Marvin Allen WR; 25 (England) Jeff Brown CB; 54 (Netherlands) Shurendy Concetion MLB; 66 (Germany) Samuel Gutekunst T; 20 (Germany) Martin Latka RB; 82 (Finland) Iiro Luoto TE; 74 (Finland) Michael Quarshie DT; 46 (Germany) Cüneyt Topcu MLB; 19 (Russia) Maxim Tregubov WR; 95 (Germany) Ulrich Winkler DE; Rookies in italics

== Schedule ==
Week	Date	Kickoff (Note: All times are in Central European Summer Time (CEST).)	Opponent	Results		Game site	Attendance
Week	Date	Kickoff	Opponent	Final score	Team record	Game site	Attendance
1	Saturday, April 2	6:00 p.m.	at Berlin Thunder	L 7–30	0–1	Olympic Stadium	16,199
2	Saturday, April 9	7:00 p.m.	Amsterdam Admirals	W 23–14	1–1	Waldstadion	31,644
3	Saturday, April 16	6:00 p.m.	at Cologne Centurions	L 14–23	1–2	RheinEnergieStadion	10,821
4	Saturday, April 23	7:00 p.m.	Hamburg Sea Devils	L 10–30	1–3	Waldstadion	22,347
5	Saturday, April 30	7:00 p.m.	Rhein Fire	W 23–20	2–3	Waldstadion	27,439
6	Sunday, May 8	3:00 p.m.	at Amsterdam Admirals	L 10–48	2–4	Amsterdam ArenA	13,227
7	Saturday, May 14	7:00 p.m.	Cologne Centurions	L 17–20 ^{OT}	2–5	Waldstadion	25,347
8	Saturday, May 21	7:00 p.m.	at Rhein Fire	W 20–13	3–5	LTU arena	28,124
9	Saturday, May 28	7:00 p.m.	Berlin Thunder	L 24–31	3–6	Waldstadion	40,109
10	Saturday, June 4	7:00 p.m.	at Hamburg Sea Devils	L 15–17	3–7	AOL Arena	21,204

== Standings ==
NFL Europe League
Team	W	L	T	PCT	PF	PA	Home	Road	STK
Berlin Thunder	7	3	0	.700	241	191	4–1	3–2	L1
Amsterdam Admirals	6	4	0	.600	265	204	5–0	1–4	L1
Cologne Centurions	6	4	0	.600	188	212	3–2	3–2	W1
Hamburg Sea Devils	5	5	0	.500	213	196	4–1	1–4	W1
Frankfurt Galaxy	3	7	0	.300	163	246	2–3	1–4	L2
Rhein Fire	3	7	0	.300	203	224	2–3	1–4	W2

== Game summaries ==
=== Week 1: at Berlin Thunder ===
Week One: Frankfurt Galaxy at Berlin Thunder – Game summary

Quarter	1	2	3	4	Total
Frankfurt	0	0	0	7	7
Berlin	3	14	3	10	30

at Olympic Stadium, Berlin, Germany

- Date: Saturday, April 2
- Game time: 6:00 p.m. CEST
- Game weather: 60 °F (15.6 °C)
- Game attendance: 16,199
- Referee: Jerome Boger

=== Week 2: vs Amsterdam Admirals ===
Week Two: Amsterdam Admirals at Frankfurt Galaxy – Game summary

Quarter	1	2	3	4	Total
Amsterdam	14	0	0	0	14
Frankfurt	0	7	13	3	23

at Waldstadion, Frankfurt, Germany

- Date: Saturday, April 9
- Game time: 7:09 p.m. CEST
- Game weather: 53 °F (11.7 °C), overcast
- Game attendance: 31,644
- Referee: Gene Steratore

=== Week 3: at Cologne Centurions ===
Week Three: Frankfurt Galaxy at Cologne Centurions – Game summary

Quarter	1	2	3	4	Total
Frankfurt	7	7	0	0	14
Cologne	3	7	10	3	23

at RheinEnergieStadion, Cologne, Germany

- Date: Saturday, April 16
- Game time: 6:06 p.m. CEST
- Game weather: 50 °F (10.0 °C), cloudly
- Game attendance: 10,821
- Referee: Carl Cheffers

=== Week 4: vs Hamburg Sea Devils ===
Week Four: Hamburg Sea Devils at Frankfurt Galaxy – Game summary

Quarter	1	2	3	4	Total
Hamburg	9	7	7	7	30
Frankfurt	0	3	0	7	10

at Waldstadion, Frankfurt, Germany

- Date: Saturday, April 23
- Game time: 7:07 p.m. CEST
- Game weather: 63 °F (17.2 °C), cloudy
- Game attendance: 22,347
- Referee: John Parry

=== Week 5: vs Rhein Fire ===
Week Five: Rhein Fire at Frankfurt Galaxy – Game summary

Quarter	1	2	3	4	Total
Rhein	7	6	0	7	20
Frankfurt	0	7	9	7	23

at Waldstadion, Frankfurt, Germany

- Date: Saturday, April 30
- Game time: 7:07 p.m. CEST
- Game weather: 73 °F (22.8 °C), sunny
- Game attendance: 27,439
- Referee: Gerald Austin

=== Week 6: at Amsterdam Admirals ===
Week Six: Frankfurt Galaxy at Amsterdam Admirals – Game summary

Quarter	1	2	3	4	Total
Frankfurt	3	0	7	0	10
Amsterdam	7	24	14	3	48

at Amsterdam ArenA, Amsterdam, Netherlands

- Date: Sunday, May 8
- Game time: 3:05 p.m. CEST
- Game attendance: 13,227
- Referee: Larry Nemmers

=== Week 7: vs Cologne Centurions ===
Week Seven: Cologne Centurions at Frankfurt Galaxy – Game summary

Quarter	1	2	3	4	OT	Total
Cologne	0	10	0	7	3	20
Frankfurt	7	7	0	3	0	17

at Waldstadion, Frankfurt, Germany

- Date: Saturday, May 14
- Game time: 7:07 p.m. CEST
- Game weather: 62 °F (16.7 °C), cloudy
- Game attendance: 25,347
- Referee: Walt Anderson

=== Week 8: at Rhein Fire ===
Week Eight: Frankfurt Galaxy at Rhein Fire – Game summary

Quarter	1	2	3	4	Total
Frankfurt	7	10	3	0	20
Rhein	0	0	3	10	13

at LTU arena, Düsseldorf, Germany

- Date: Saturday, May 21
- Game time: 7:06 p.m. CEST
- Game weather: 61 °F (16.24 °C), cloudy
- Game attendance: 28,124
- Referee: Jerome Boger

=== Week 9: vs Berlin Thunder ===
Week Nine: Berlin Thunder at Frankfurt Galaxy – Game summary

Quarter	1	2	3	4	Total
Berlin	7	7	3	14	31
Frankfurt	7	14	0	3	24

at Waldstadion, Frankfurt, Germany

- Date: Saturday, May 28
- Game time: 7:07 p.m. CEST
- Game weather: 87 °F (30.6 °C), sunny
- Game attendance: 40,109
- Referee: Jerome Boger

=== Week 10: at Hamburg Sea Devils ===
Week Ten: Frankfurt Galaxy at Hamburg Sea Devils – Game summary

Quarter	1	2	3	4	Total
Frankfurt	0	6	0	9	15
Hamburg	0	14	0	3	17

at AOL Arena, Hamburg, Germany

- Date: Saturday, June 4
- Game time: 7:04 p.m. CEST
- Game weather: 59 °F (15.0 °C), partly cloudy
- Game attendance: 21,204
- Referee: Walt Coleman
