= Dewitt Ellerbe =

American football player (born 1981)

Dewitt Ellerbe (born April 1, 1981) is a former American football defensive back for the New York Giants of the National Football League and National Football League Europe for the Amsterdam Admirals. He was signed by the Giants after the 2004 NFL draft. He played college football at South Carolina State University, where he earned second-team All Meac Honors.

At South Carolina State University, Ellerbe was a four-year starter for the Bulldogs playing Safety and Cornerback. As a senior, he had 50 tackles (37 solo) and two interceptions for 78 yards. Ellerbe also blocked a field goal attempt, a punt and scored two touchdowns.

== College career ==
During his teenage years, Dewitt Ellerbe attended Lamar High School a division 1A high school in South Carolina.[2] Ellerbe attended the South Carolina State University, where he played for the Bulldogs football team under Head Football Coach Willie Jefferies in his first two seasons. During his junior and senior campaigns Ellerbe played under former Bulldog player and coach Buddy Pough, where he was a recognized as one of the top defensive backs in the MEAC. After his junior season, Ellerbe was recognized as team captain and earned second-team All-MEAC honors.

In 36 starts with the Bulldogs, Ellerbe recorded 131 tackles, 32 pass defended and 6 career interceptions. Ellerbe also recorded 4 blocked kicks and two touchdowns in his college career. Both of Ellerbe's touchdowns came in his final game for the Bulldogs in which he scored on a 75-yard interception return and on a 90-yard block field goal against the Bulldogs arch-rival North Carolina A&T.

== Professional career ==
Ellerbe was signed by the New York Giants in April 2004 as a cornerback. He appeared in three games before being released prior to the start of the 2004 NFL season. In February of the following year, Ellerbe was drafted in the 5th Round of the NFL Europe draft by the Amsterdam Admirals where he was a solid contributor prior to his career-ending shoulder injury.
