= 2005 Hamburg Sea Devils season =

NFL Europe team season

- General manager: Kathrin Platz
- Head coach: Jack Bicknell
- Home stadium: AOL Arena

Results
- Record: 5–5
- Division place: 4th
- Playoffs: Did not qualify

The 2005 Hamburg Sea Devils season was the inaugural season for the franchise in the NFL Europe League (NFLEL). The team was led by head coach Jack Bicknell, and played its home games at AOL Arena in Hamburg, Germany. They finished the regular season in fourth place with a record of five wins and five losses.

== Offseason ==
=== Free agent draft ===
2005 Hamburg Sea Devils NFLEL free agent draft selections
Draft order		Player name	Position	College
Round	Choice	Player name	Position	College
1	1	Ron Johnson	DE	Shippensburg
2	7	Shawn Lynch	C	Duke
3	18	Ivory McCoy	DE	Michigan State
4	19	Lawrence Richardson	CB	Arkansas
5	30	Sean Mulcahy	TE	Connecticut
6	31	Sacha Lancaster	DE	Arkansas
7	42	Jason Waters	CB	Tennessee

== Personnel ==
=== Staff ===
2005 Hamburg Sea Devils staff
Front office: General manager – Kathrin Platz; Head coaches: Head coach – Jack Bicknell; Offensive coaches: Offensive coordinator/offensive line – Vince Martino; Quarterbacks/wide receivers – Sam Rutigliano; National coach/running backs/special teams – Patrick Esume; Assistant Wide Receivers – Marvin Marshall	Defensive coaches: Defensive coordinator/defensive backs – Dan Daniel; Defensive line – Denauld Brown; Linebackers – Charles Jones; Assistant linebackers – Joe Bowden; Strength and conditioning: Strength and conditioning – Joe Makovec

=== Roster ===
2005 Hamburg Sea Devils final roster
Quarterbacks: 14 Tom Arth; 5 Casey Bramlet; 7 Ryan Dinwiddie; Running backs: 22 Zack Abron; 24 Larry Croom; 36 Chris Douglas; Wide receivers: 11 Cedric Bonner; 81 Ricky Bryant; 83 Chris Collins; 84 Derek McCoy; 86 Terrance Metcalf; Tight ends: 85 Bobby Blizzard; 40 Ben Miller	Offensive linemen: 75 Tyson Clabo T; 70 Joseph Hayes G; 68 Thomas Herrion T; 73 Shawn Lynch C; 74 Brandon Newton G; 79 Rodney Reed G/T; 76 Lenny Vandermade C; 69 Eric Wilson G; Defensive linemen: 98 Kevin Emanuel DE; 92 Aaron Hunt DT; 96 Sacha Lancaster DE; 90 Ivory McCoy DE; 93 Tim McGill DT; 95 Antonio Smith DE/DT	Linebackers: 55 Scott Genord OLB; 57 Nick McNeil MLB; 53 Shawn Morgan OLB; 56 Marquis Smith OLB; Defensive backs: 25 Marcell Allmond FS/CB; 20 Allan Amundson CB; 26 Rufus Brown CB; 23 Eric Crouch FS; 35 Shawn Mayer SS; 29 Zach Norton CB; 21 Lawrence Richardson CB; Special teams: 8 Todd France K; 2 B. J. Sander P	National players: 54 (England) Aden Durde MLB; 99 (Germany) Bastian Lano DT; 33 (Sweden) Patrik Lundqvist SS; 80 (Sweden) Cristian Malm WR; 87 (England) Scott McCready WR; 30 (Germany) Claudius Osei FS; 72 (Germany) Julian Pjanic T; 71 (Germany) Philipp Stursberg DE; 38 (Germany) Patrick Wischnewski RB; Rookies in italics

== Schedule ==
Week	Date	Kickoff (Note: All times are in Central European Summer Time (CEST).)	Opponent	Results		Game site	Attendance
Week	Date	Kickoff	Opponent	Final score	Team record	Game site	Attendance
1	Saturday, April 2	6:00 p.m.	at Cologne Centurions	L 23–24	0–1	RheinEnergieStadion	9,468
2	Sunday, April 10	4:00 p.m.	at Berlin Thunder	L 13–15	0–2	Olympic Stadium	14,312
3	Saturday, April 16	7:00 p.m.	Rhein Fire	W 31–24	1–2	AOL Arena	19,865
4	Saturday, April 23	7:00 p.m.	at Frankfurt Galaxy	W 30–10	2–2	Waldstadion	22,347
5	Saturday, April 30	7:00 p.m.	Cologne Centurions	W 23–6	3–2	AOL Arena	15,228
6	Saturday, May 7	7:00 p.m.	at Rhein Fire	L 19–24	3–3	LTU arena	18,632
7	Saturday, May 14	7:00 p.m.	Amsterdam Admirals	W 30–24 ^{OT}	4–3	AOL Arena	16,415
8	Sunday, May 22	4:00 p.m.	Berlin Thunder	L 17–27	4–4	AOL Arena	16,889
9	Sunday, May 29	3:00 p.m.	at Amsterdam Admirals	L 10–27	4–5	Amsterdam ArenA	16,371
10	Saturday, June 4	7:00 p.m.	Frankfurt Galaxy	W 17–15	5–5	AOL Arena	21,204

== Standings ==
NFL Europe League
Team	W	L	T	PCT	PF	PA	Home	Road	STK
Berlin Thunder	7	3	0	.700	241	191	4–1	3–2	L1
Amsterdam Admirals	6	4	0	.600	265	204	5–0	1–4	L1
Cologne Centurions	6	4	0	.600	188	212	3–2	3–2	W1
Hamburg Sea Devils	5	5	0	.500	213	196	4–1	1–4	W1
Frankfurt Galaxy	3	7	0	.300	163	246	2–3	1–4	L2
Rhein Fire	3	7	0	.300	203	224	2–3	1–4	W2

== Game summaries ==
=== Week 1: at Cologne Centurions ===
Week One: Hamburg Sea Devils at Cologne Centurions – Game summary

Quarter	1	2	3	4	Total
Hamburg	7	3	3	10	23
Cologne	7	7	3	7	24

at RheinEnergieStadion, Cologne, Germany

- Date: Saturday, April 2
- Game time: 6:06 p.m. CEST
- Game weather: 57 °F (13.9 °C), clear
- Game attendance: 9,468
- Referee: Gene Steratore

=== Week 2: at Berlin Thunder ===
Week Two: Hamburg Sea Devils at Berlin Thunder – Game summary

Quarter	1	2	3	4	Total
Hamburg	3	3	0	7	13
Berlin	5	0	7	3	15

at Olympic Stadium, Berlin, Germany

- Date: Sunday, April 10
- Game time: 4:04 p.m. CEST
- Game weather: 46 °F (7.8 °C)
- Game attendance: 14,312
- Referee: Walt Anderson

=== Week 3: vs Rhein Fire ===
Week Three: Rhein Fire at Hamburg Sea Devils – Game summary

Quarter	1	2	3	4	Total
Rhein	0	0	7	17	24
Hamburg	10	21	0	0	31

at AOL Arena, Hamburg, Germany

- Date: Saturday, April 16
- Game time: 7:06 p.m. CEST
- Game weather: 59 °F (15.0 °C), clear skies
- Game attendance: 19,865
- Referee: Alberto Riveron

=== Week 4: at Frankfurt Galaxy ===
Week Four: Hamburg Sea Devils at Frankfurt Galaxy – Game summary

Quarter	1	2	3	4	Total
Hamburg	9	7	7	7	30
Frankfurt	0	3	0	7	10

at Waldstadion, Frankfurt, Germany

- Date: Saturday, April 23
- Game time: 7:07 p.m. CEST
- Game weather: 63 °F (17.2 °C), cloudy
- Game attendance: 22,347
- Referee: John Parry

=== Week 5: vs Cologne Centurions ===
Week Five: Cologne Centurions at Hamburg Sea Devils – Game summary

Quarter	1	2	3	4	Total
Cologne	0	3	0	3	6
Hamburg	0	6	0	17	23

at AOL Arena, Hamburg, Germany

- Date: Saturday, April 30
- Game time: 7:05 p.m. CEST
- Game weather: 64 °F (17.8 °C), mostly cloudy
- Game attendance: 15,228
- Referee: Scott Green

=== Week 6: at Rhein Fire ===
Week Six: Hamburg Sea Devils at Rhein Fire – Game summary

Quarter	1	2	3	4	Total
Hamburg	0	6	7	6	19
Rhein	7	7	10	0	24

at LTU arena, Düsseldorf, Germany

- Date: Saturday, May 7
- Game time: 7:06 p.m. CEST
- Game weather: 45 °F (7.28 °C), roof closed
- Game attendance: 18,632
- Referee: Craig Wrolstad

=== Week 7: vs Amsterdam Admirals ===
Week Seven: Amsterdam Admirals at Hamburg Sea Devils – Game summary

Quarter	1	2	3	4	OT	Total
Amsterdam	14	3	0	7	0	24
Hamburg	0	13	3	8	6	30

at AOL Arena, Hamburg, Germany

- Date: Saturday, May 14
- Game time: 7:05 p.m. CEST
- Game weather: 61 °F (16.1 °C), cloudy
- Game attendance: 16,415
- Referee: Jerome Boger

=== Week 8: vs Berlin Thunder ===
Week Eight: Berlin Thunder at Hamburg Sea Devils – Game summary

Quarter	1	2	3	4	Total
Berlin	7	7	7	6	27
Hamburg	7	7	3	0	17

at AOL Arena, Hamburg, Germany

- Date: Sunday, May 22
- Game time: 4:05 p.m. CEST
- Game weather: 70 °F (21.1 °C), sunny
- Game attendance: 16,889
- Referee: Walt Anderson

=== Week 9: at Amsterdam Admirals ===
Week Nine: Hamburg Sea Devils at Amsterdam Admirals – Game summary

Quarter	1	2	3	4	Total
Hamburg	0	3	0	7	10
Amsterdam	3	3	14	7	27

at Amsterdam ArenA, Amsterdam, Netherlands

- Date: Sunday, May 29
- Game time: 3:05 p.m. CEST
- Game weather: 72 °F (22.2 °C), roof closed
- Game attendance: 16,371
- Referee: Carl Cheffers

=== Week 10: vs Frankfurt Galaxy ===
Week Ten: Frankfurt Galaxy at Hamburg Sea Devils – Game summary

Quarter	1	2	3	4	Total
Frankfurt	0	6	0	9	15
Hamburg	0	14	0	3	17

at AOL Arena, Hamburg, Germany

- Date: Saturday, June 4
- Game time: 7:04 p.m. CEST
- Game weather: 59 °F (15.0 °C), partly cloudy
- Game attendance: 21,204
- Referee: Walt Coleman
