= 2005 NFL Europe season =

European-American football season

The 2005 NFL Europe season was the 13th season in 15 years of the American football league that started out as the World League of American Football. The Hamburg Sea Devils replaced the Scottish Claymores for the 2005 season.

NFL Europe League
Team	W	L	T	PCT	PF	PA	Home	Road	STK
Berlin Thunder	7	3	0	.700	241	191	4–1	3–2	L1
Amsterdam Admirals	6	4	0	.600	265	204	5–0	1–4	L1
Cologne Centurions	6	4	0	.600	188	212	3–2	3–2	W1
Hamburg Sea Devils	5	5	0	.500	213	196	4–1	1–4	W1
Frankfurt Galaxy	3	7	0	.300	163	246	2–3	1–4	L2
Rhein Fire	3	7	0	.300	203	224	2–3	1–4	W2

== World Bowl XIII ==
World Bowl XIII was held on Saturday, June 11, 2005 at LTU Arena in Düsseldorf, Germany. The Amsterdam Admirals defeated the Berlin Thunder, 27–21.
